= List of Tamil films of 1947 =

The following is a list of films produced in the Tamil film industry in India in 1947, in alphabetical order.

== 1947 ==
| Title | Director | Production | Music | Cast | Release date (D-M-Y) |
|---|---|---|---|---|---|
| 1000 Thalaivangi Apoorva Chinthamani | T. R. Sundaram | Modern Theatres | G. Ramanathan | V. N. Janaki, P. S. Govindan, S. Varalakshmi, M. R. Swaminathan, Kali N. Rathnam, C. T. Rajakantham, Ganesa Bhagavathar, Madhuri Devi, R. Balasubramaniam | 08-12-1947 |
| Baktha Thulasidas | B. S. Ranga | Vikram Art Productions | Anil Biswas-S. Balachander | B. S. Raja Iyengar, Lakshmi Shankar, C. V. V. Panthulu, Joker Ramudu, Thulasi | 15-08-1947 |
| Chithrabahavali | Nanubhai Vakil | Goodwin Pictures | | V. N. Janaki, Premkumar, Madhavan, Manipillai, Chithralekha, Indira Acharya, Rajam, Banumathi | 11-04-1947 |
| Deivaneethi | M. L. Tandon & Jiten Banerjee | Windsor Productions | M. S. Gnanamani | V. A. Chellappa, P. Kannamba, K. R. Ramasamy, N. R. Sakunthala, T. S. Durairaj, S. P. L. Dhanalakshmi, K. R. Chellam | 02-05-1947 |
| Dhana Amaravathi | B. S. Ramiah | Ambika Pictures | K. V. Mahadevan | B. S. Saroja, S. M. Kumaresan, V. N. Sundaram, Vadivambal, Pulimoottai Ramaswami, Kumari Rajam, J. P. Chandrababu | 29-11-1947 |
| Ekambavanan | B. N. Rao & T. V. Krishnasami | Saravanabhava Pictures | G. Ramanathan | Kothamangalam Seenu, P. A. Periyanayaki, K. Sarangapani, C. T. Rajakantham, Nagerkoil Mahadevan, S. V. Subbaiah | 21-08-1947 |
| Kadagam | Acharya | Tamil Nadu Talkies | G. Ramanathan | T. S. Balaiah, Suryakumari, Vijayakumar, T. S. Krishnaveni, T. R. Ramachandran, T. S. Durairaj, R. Balasubramaniam, Kumari Kamala, Leela | 12-04-1947 |
| Kanjan | Kovai C. Aiyamuthu & T. R. Gopu | Jupiter Pictures | S. M. Subbaiah Naidu | S. V. Subbaiah, R. Malathi, M. N. Nambiar, T. G. Kamala Devi, P. V. Narasimha Bharathi, M. K. Mustafa, M. S. S. Bhagyam | 11-11-1947 |
| Kannika | S. M. Sriramulu Naidu | Pakshiraja Studios | Papanasam Sivan | M. S. Sarojini, T. E. Varadhan, M. R. Santhanalakshmi, N. S. Krishnan, T. A. Madhuram, D. Balasubramaniam, Kali N. Rathnam | 11-11-1947 |
| Kundalakesi | Bomman D. Irani | K. S. S Pictures | S. M. Subbaiah Naidu & G. Ramanathan | C. Honnappa Bhagavathar, N. C. Vasanthakokilam, G. Pattu Iyer, K. L. V. Vasantha, T. R. Ramachandran, G. M. Basheer, R. Padma, P. R. Mangalam | 13-03-1947 |
| Mahathma Udangar | G. Pattu Iyer | Sri Kamal Productions | S. V. Venkatraman & T. R. Ramanathan | Kothamangalam Seenu, T. R. Ramachandran, Vijayakumari, Anjali Devi, Vidwan Srinivasan, Kulathu Mani, Sowthamini, K. R. Chellam, Kumari Kamala | 11-11-1947 |
| Malai Mangai | | Baskar Pictures | | T. S. Madhu, Vimalkumar, R. B. Lakshmi Devi | |
| Madhanamala | K. Vembu | Tamil Nadu Talkies | M. S. Gnanamani | Sriram, T. R. Rajani, P. B. Rangachari, Vidwan Srinivasan, P. S. Veerappa, R. N. Nambiar, S. R. Janaki, T. S. Jaya | 12-12-1947 |
| Miss Malini | Kothamangalam Subbu | Gemini Studios | S. Rajeswara Rao & Parur S. Anantharaman | Pushpavalli, Kothamangalam Subbu, M. S. Sundari Bai, Javar Sitaraman, Gemini Ganesan, V. Gopalakrishnan | 26-09-1947 |
| Naam Iruvar | A. V. Meiyappan | AVM Productions | R. Sudharsanam | T. R. Mahalingam, T. A. Jayalakshmi, Kumari Kamala, T. R. Ramachandran, B. R. Panthulu, K. Sarangapani, V. K. Ramasamy | 12-01-1947 |
| Paithiyakkaran | Krishnan–Panju | N. S. K. Pictures | M. S. Gnanamani & C. R. Subburaman | S. V. Sahasranamam, T. A. Madhuram, N. S. Krishnan, M. G. Ramachandran, D. Balasubramaniam, S. J. Kantha, S. R. Janaki, T. A. Jayalakshmi | 26-09-1947 |
| Pankajavalli | S. Soundararajan | Tamil Nadu Talkies | Papanasam Sivan | P. U. Chinnappa, T. R. Rajakumari, Kumari Rukmini, N. S. Krishnan, T. A. Madhuram | 10-10-1947 |
| Ponnaruvi | C. V. Raman | C. V. Raman | G. Ramanathan | V. A. Chellappa, Kothamangalam Seenu, K. T. Rukmani, R. Balasubramaniam, P. G. Venkatesan, P. R. Mangalam, T. S. Durairaj, T. S. Jaya | 01-03-1947 |
| Rajakumari | A. S. A. Sami | Jupiter Pictures | S. M. Subbaiah Naidu | M. G. Ramachandran, K. Malathi, T. S. Balaiah, M. R. Swaminathan, K. Thavamani Devi, M. N. Nambiar, Pulimoottai Ramaswami | 11-04-1947 |
| Rama Rajyam (dubbed from Hindi) | Vijay Bhatt | AVM Productions | R. Sudharsanam | Shobhna Samarth, Prem Adib, Amirbai Karnataki, Umakant Desai, Badri Prasad, Chandrakant | |
| Rukmangadhan | P. S. V. Iyer | National Studio-Iyer Productions | G. Ramanathan | G. N. Balasubramaniam, P. R. Mangalam, T. R. Ramachandran, G. Narayana Rao, P. A. Periyanayaki, C. T. Rajakantham, P. A. Rajamani | 06-05-1947 |
| Sulochana | T. R. Sundaram; P. B. Krishna Iyer | Modern Theatres | | T. R. Sundaram, K. L. V. Vasantha, V. A. Chellappa, M. R. Santhanalakshmi, T. V. Kumudhini, Kali N. Rathnam, C. T. Rajakantham | 31-01-1947 |
| Surusuruppu | | Lakshmi Films | | | |
| Thaai Nadu | T. S. Mani | Chitrakala Movietone | R. Narayana Iyer | Battling Mani, S. T. Williams, V. P. S. Mani, T. K. Krishnaiah, M. R. Sundari, N. C. Meera | 15-08-1947 |
| Thiyagi | Ramji Bai Arya | Moorthy Productions | S. V. Venkatraman & T. R. Ramanathan | V. N. Janaki, N. Krishnamurthi, V. S. Mani, Kulathu Mani, K. S. Angamuthu | 22-08-1947 |
| Thulasi Jalandar | K. B. Nagabhushanam | Raja Rajeswari Films | M. D. Parthasarathy | P. U. Chinnappa, P. Kannamba, S. Varalakshmi, Kothamangalam Seenu, T. S. Durairaj, R. Balasubramaniam, T. S. Jaya, Rushyendramani | 11-08-1947 |
| Udayanan Vasavadatta | T. R. Raghunath | Uma Pictures | C. R. Subburaman | G. N. Balasubramaniam, Vasundhara Devi, M. S. Saroja, D. Balasubramaniam, K. Sarangapani, Kali N. Rathnam, C. T. Rajakantham | 21-06-1947 |
| Veera Vanitha | Nanubai Pat | Mohan Pictures | | P. S. Srinivasa Rao, Sahadevan, Madhu, R. B. Lakshmi Devi, Indira Acharya, Saroja | |
| Vichitra Vanitha | K. Subramanyam | Madras United Artists Corporation | Br Lakshmanan | B. S. Saroja, Chitra S. Krishnaswami, Pulimoottai Ramaswami, P. A. Periyanayaki, K. S. Angamuthu | 10-10-1947 |
| Vedhalapuram | Nanubhai Vakil | Bhaskar Pictures | | Nageswara Rao, S. Varalakshmi, Madhava Rao, Leela, Subba Rao, Baby Rani | |
