= List of Modern Theatres films =

Partial list of the Movies produced by Modern Theatres (T.R.Sundram Mudaliyar)ltd.

Year	Movie
1935	Modern Girl
1936	Bandit Of The Air
1936	Country Girl
1937	Modern Lady
1937	Modern Youth
1937	Mr. Ammanchi
1937	Naveena Nirupama
1937	Sati Ahalya
1938	Balan
1938	Dhaksha Yagnam
1938	Kambar
1938	Maya Mayavan
1938	Mayuradhwaja
1938	Thayumanavar
1939	Manickavasagar
1939	Manmadha Vijayam
1939	Satyavani
1939	Sri Shankarachariyar
1940	Harihara Maya
1940	Rajayogam
1940	Satyavaani
1940	Sati Mahananda
1940	Uthama Puthiran
1940	Vikrama Urvashi
1941	Bhakta Gowri
1941	Dayalan
1942	Ashok
1942	Manonmani
1942	Sivalinga Satchi
1943	Arunthathi
1943	Diwan Bahadur
1943	Soorappuli
1944	Chow Chow
1944	Raja Rajeswari
1945	Burma Rani
1945	Chitra
1945	Kalikala Minor
1946	Sangram
1946	Subadhra
1947	Aayiram Thalai Vaangi Apoorva Chinthamani
1947	Sulochana
1948	Adhithan Kanavu
1950	Digambara Samiyar
1950	Manthiri Kumari
1950	Ponmudi
1951	Aada Janma
1951	Sarvadhikari
1952	The Jungle ( English & Tamil Film )
1952	Athinti Kapuram
1952	Kalyani
1952	Savathiporu
1952	Valayapathi (film)
1953	Mangala Gowri
1953	Thirumbi Paar
1954	Deva Kannika
1954	Illarajothi
1954	Sugam Enge
1955	Kathanayaki
1955	Maheswari
1956	Ali Baba and the Forty Thieves
1956	Alibabavum 40 Thirudargalum
1956	Paasavalai
1957	Aaravalli
1957	Kitna Badal Gaya Insan
1957	Veerakankanam
1958	Petra Maganai Vitra Annai
1959	Engal Kula Daivi
1959	Thalai Koduthaan Thambi
1959	Vannakili
1960	Anna Chellalu
1960	Kaithi Kannayiram
1961	Kandam Vecha Kottu
1961	Kumudham
1961	Modern Girl
1962	Kavitha
1963	Kattu Roja
1963	Konjum Kumari
1963	Yarukku Sondam
1964	Amma Engey
1964	Chitrangi
1965	Monagaalluku Managadu
1965	Vallavanukku Vallavan
1966	Iru Vallavargal
1966	Vallavan Oruvan
1967	Ethirigal Jakkirathai
1967	Kadhalithal Podhuma
1968	Evaru Monagadu
1969	Naangu Killadigal
1969	Pyar Ka Sapna
1970	CID Shankar
1971	Justice Viswanathan
1971	Nenu Manishine
1972	Karundhel Kannayiram
1973	Thedi Vandha Lakshmi
1974	Prayachittham
1979	Kali Koyil Kabali
1979	Vallavan Varugiran
1942	Sathi Sukanya
