= Dewan Bahadur (film) =

Diwan Bahadur
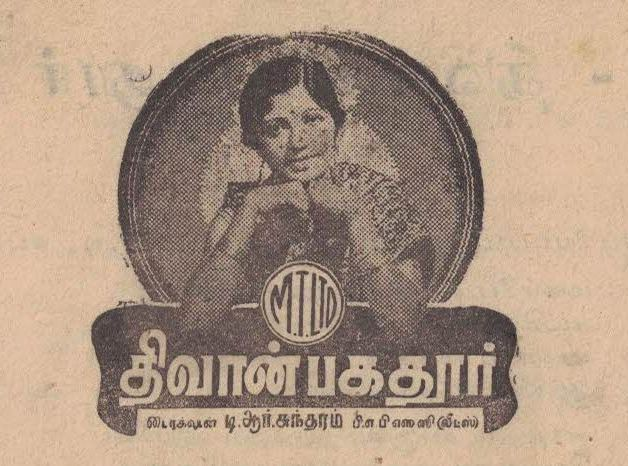
- Directed by: T. R. Sundaram
- Written by: M. Haridass
- Produced by: T. R. Sundaram
- Starring: T. R. Ramachandran; Kali N. Rathnam; J. Susheela; C. T. Rajakantham
- Cinematography: W. R. Subba Rao
- Edited by: D. Dorairaj
- Music by: T. A. Kalyanam (Asst. K. V. Mahadevan)
- Production company: Modern Theatres
- Release date: 28 October 1943 (India)
- Country: India
- Language: Tamil

Diwan Bahadur (transl. Dewan Bahadur) is a 1943 Indian, Tamil language film directed and produced by T. R. Sundaram. The film featured T. R. Ramachandran and J. Susheela in the lead roles.

== Plot ==
The story is about an illiterate rich man, played by Kali N. Rathnam, who is honoured with the title of Dewan Bahadur by the British colonial government in India. T. R. Ramachandran is a critic of such people. He addresses meetings in English against such people being honoured.

== Cast ==
The list is adapted from the film. (See External links)

Male cast

- T. R. Ramachandran
- K. K. Perumal
- Kali N. Rathnam
- E. R. Sahadevan
- M. E. Madhavan
- V. N. Kumaraswamy
- V. M. Ezhumalai - (not credited in titles)

Female cast

- J. Susheela
- P. S. Sivabhakyam
- T. N. Rajalakshmi
- C. T. Rajakantham
- P. R. Mangalam
- P. S. Gnanam

== Production ==
The film was produced by Modern Theatres owner T. R. Sundaram who also directed the film. M. Haridass wrote the story, screenplay and dialogues. W. R. Subba Rao handled the cinematography while D. Dorairaj edited the film. Audiography was done by R. G. Pillay. Settings and design were done by A. J. Dominic and P. B. Krishnan. The film was shot at Modern Theatres studios and processing was done by B. V. Modak. Lyrics were penned by S. Velsamy. There is no mention of any music composer in the film titles.

T. R. Ramachandran never learnt English language. But his diction, pronunciation and accent were perfect. T. R. Sundaram, who was educated in England, was surprised at T. R. Ramachandran's spoken English. He appreciated the actor's performance and rewarded him with a handsome bonus.

== Soundtrack ==
T. A. Kalyanam composed the music. K. V. Mahadevan worked as an assistant to him.

- Yennai Kandathum - V. M. Ezhumalai
- Aatrale Arive Mika Uyarvaam - C. T. Rajakantham
