= Sivalinga Satchi =

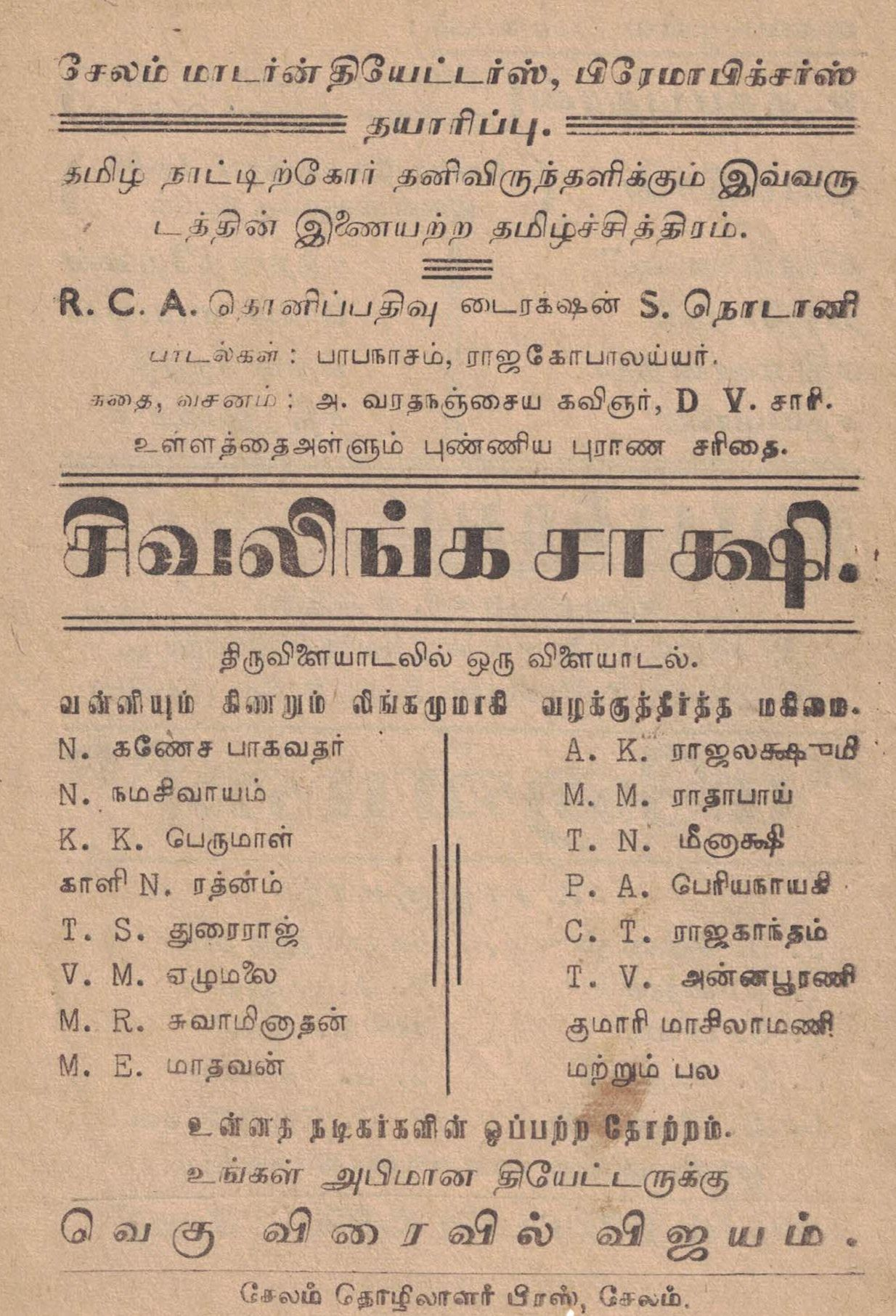
- Directed by: S. Nottani
- Written by: அ. வரதநஞ்சைய கவி டி. வி. சாரி
- Produced by: T. R. Sundaram
- Starring: Ganesha Bhagavathar; Kali N. Rathnam; T. S. Durairaj; C. T. Rajakantham
- Distributed by: Modern Theatres
- Release date: 1 January 1942
- Country: India
- Language: Tamil

Sivalinga Satchi is a 1942 Indian Tamil-language film directed by S. Nottani. The film was produced by Modern Theatres.

== Cast ==
- Ganesha Bhagavathar
- Kali N. Rathnam
- T. S. Durairaj
- C. T. Rajakantham
- P. A. Periyanayaki

== See also ==
List of Modern Theatres films
