= 1000 Thalaivangi Apoorva Chinthamani =

1947 film by T. R. Sundaram

- Film poster
- Directed by: T. R. Sundaram
- Screenplay by: T. R. Sundaram
- Produced by: T. R. Sundaram
- Starring: P. S. Govindan; V. N. Janaki
- Cinematography: R. M. Krishnaswamy
- Edited by: L. Balu
- Music by: G. Ramanathan
- Production company: Modern Theatres
- Release date: 8 December 1947
- Running time: 214 minutes
- Country: India
- Language: Tamil

1000 Thalaivangi Apoorva Chinthamani (read as "Aayiram Thalaivangi Apoorva Chinthamani"; transl. Unique Chinthamani, who took a thousand lives) is a 1947 Indian Tamil-language fantasy adventure film directed and produced by T. R. Sundaram. The screenplay was written by Sundaram and the dialogue by Bharathidasan. Music was composed by G. Ramanathan. The film stars P. S. Govindan and V. N. Janaki. The film was released on 8 December 1947, and became a big box-office success. It was remade in Telugu as Sahasra Sirchedha Apporva Chinthamani (1960) by the same studio.

== Cast ==
Male cast

- P. S. Govindan as Meiyazhagan
- M. R. Saminathan as Monk
- M. G. Chakrapani as Neethikethu
- E. R. Sahadevan as Purandharan
- K. K. Perumal as Gunapathi
- R. Balasubramaniam as Madhivadhanan
- Kali N. Rathnam as Kali
- T. S. Durairaj as Guard
- M. E. Madhavan as Velan
- V. M. Ezhumalai as Mannappan

Female cast

- V. N. Janaki as Apoorva Chinthamani
- S. Varalakshmi as Senkamalam
- R. Padma as Manjalazhagi
- M. Madhuri Devi as Dhampathi
- C. T. Rajakantham as Thangam
- P. R. Chandra as Velamma
- Susheela as Sundaravalli
- Saraswathi as Selavanayagam
- Chellam as Pachaiveni
- M. S. Subbulakshmi as Dancer

== Soundtrack ==
Music and lyrics were composed by G. Ramanathan.

Songs	Singers	Length
"Paaril Bangi"	Pazhani Baheerathi	03:38
"Vetchathu Vetchadhuthan Pulli"	C. T. Rajakantham	02:20
"Kadhal Padagile Naam"	Pazhani Baheerathi	01:58
"Yarenkku Edhire"	Pazhani Baheerathi	02:12
"Kadhalaginen"	S. Varalakshmi	02:34
"Nallathai Sollidaven"	G. Ramanathan	03:31
"Ankalin Peyar Koodathamma"		01:59
"Thaayae Thanthaiyae"	P. S. Govindan	02:25
"Ullukulle Neenga"	C. T. Rajakantham & Kali N. Rathnam	03:44
"Naalu Paeru Kannukkethukka"		02:09
"Kundu Malikai Parikka"	P. S. Govindan & Kali N. Rathnam	03:12
"Maadhar Manonmaniye"	P. S. Govindan & S. Varalakshmi	02:26
"Ellaarkkum Nallinbam"	P. S. Govindan	01:49
"Maalai Mayangidum Nerathile"		02:39
"Thaaye Thayaanithiye"	P. S. Govindan	02:25

== Bibliography ==
- Dhananjayan, G. (2014). Pride of Tamil Cinema: 1931–2013. Blue Ocean Publishers. OCLC 898765509.
