= Dayalan =

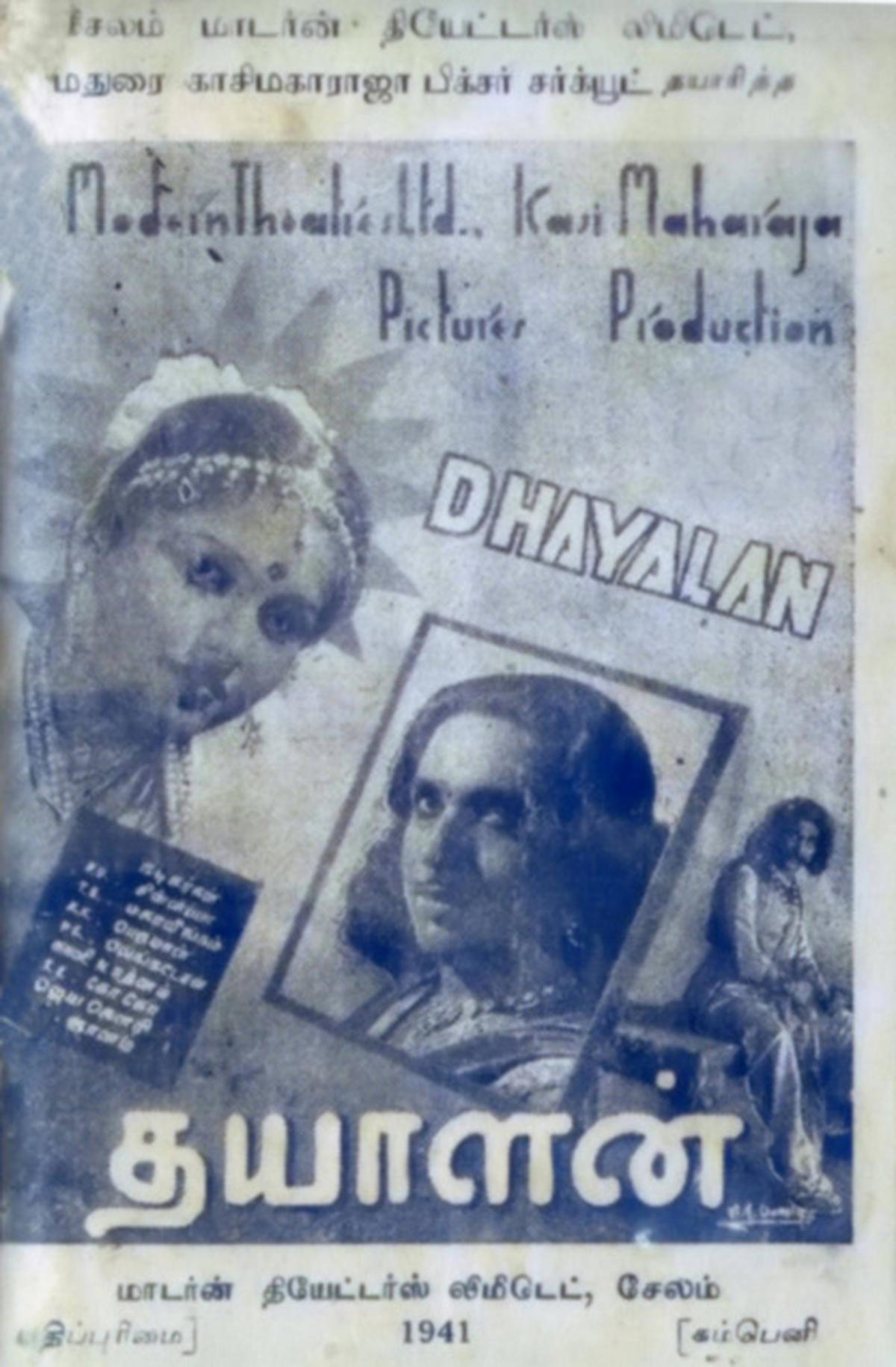
- Movie poster
- Directed by: A. Mithra Das
- Screenplay by: Kuppusami Kavi
- Story by: Kasi Viswanatha Pandian
- Produced by: T. R. Sundaram
- Starring: P. U. Chinnappa; T. R. Mahalingam; Kali N. Rathnam; K. V. Jayagowri; V. M. Ezhumalai; C. T. Rajakantham
- Production company: Modern Theatres
- Release date: 20 December 1941 (India)
- Country: India
- Language: Tamil

Dayalan is a 1941 Indian, Tamil-language film produced by T. R. Sundaram and directed by A. Mithra Das. The film stars P. U. Chinnappa, T. R. Mahalingam and K. V. Jayagowri.

== Plot ==
King Arputhavarman has two sons, Dayalan from his deceased first wife and Bharathan from his second wife. He also brought up a young girl, Padmavathi. Dayalan falls in love with Padmavathi. A servant, Dunmathi, succeeds in poisoning the mind of the King and becomes the prime minister. The prime minister and his son, Prathapan, conspire to take over the Kingdom. Dunmathi convinces the King that Dayalan is trying to kill the king and take over the Kingdom. The king sentences his son to death. Dayalan escapes from prison with the help of his friends. After many twists and turns, Dayalan succeeds in exposing the conspiracy by the prime minister and his son. The king realises his folly. Dunmathi and Prathapan are killed. Dayalan marries Padmavathi and is crowned as King.

== Cast ==
The list is compiled from the film's song book.

Male cast

- P. U. Chinnappa as Dayalan
- T. R. Mahalingam as Bharathan
- Kali N. Rathnam as Chadayan
- P. G. Venkatesan as Sanyasi (Sergeant)
- K. K. Perumal as Dunmathi
- S. S. Kokko (Real name: Pasupuleti Srinivasulu Naidu) as Sokku
- T. M. Ramasami as Arputhavarman (King)
- E. R. Sahadevan as Prathapan
- B. P. Ramalingam as Krupakarar
- V. M. Ezhumalai as Vengan
- N. V. Krishnan as Madavian

Female cast

- K. V. Jayagowri as Padmavathi
- P. S. Gnanam as Chilambu
- C. T. Rajakantham as Alamu
- S. S. Bhagyalakshmi as Manorama (Queen)
- Ramani as Kanaga
- Baby Jayalakshmi as Poor Girl

Dance

- Kulkarni & Party, Rohini, Dhanam, Bala, Usha.

== Production ==
The film was produced by T. R. Sundaram under his own banner Modern Theatres and was directed by A. Mithra Das. The story was written by Kasi Viswanatha Pandian, the Elayaraja (Prince) of Ettayapuram. The dialogue was written by Kuppusami Kavi.

== Soundtrack ==
Tunes for almost all the songs were lifted from Hindi and Bengali. The song book gives the source for all songs. However, there is one song, Ullame Kavarnthu Ehinal, sung by P. U. Chinnappa in pure Carnatic raga SayadhaRanjani set to Adi Thalam. No music director was credited. Lyrics were penned by Maharaja Vaththiyar.

Song list

| No. | Song | Singer/s | Duration (m:ss) |
|---|---|---|---|
| 1 | "Jagan Maya, Sahaya" | K. V. Jayagowri, group | |
| 2 | "Aanandam Tharum Diname" | K. V. Jayagowri | |
| 3 | "Ithupothe Kanpaalo" | K. V. Jayagowri | |
| 4 | "Anbe Umadhu Inbamthanaye" | K. V. Jayagowri | |
| 5 | "Ullame Kavarnthu Ehinal" | P. U. Chinnappa | |
| 6 | "Piriya Nesiye, Endhan Maane" | P. U. Chinnappa | |
| 7 | "Muthukkavi Chiththaritha" | P. U. Chinnappa | |
| 8 | "Vanidhamaniye Vaanjaiyin Kanive" | P. U. Chinnappa, K. V. Jayagowri | |
| 9 | "Komala Maane Guna Bhooshaname" | P. U. Chinnappa, K. V. Jayagowri | 2:43 |
| 10 | "Pooja Balamidhuthaano" | P. U. Chinnappa, K. V. Jayagowri | |
| 11 | "Enake Jayam Kidaithathuve" | T. R. Mahalingam | |
| 12 | "Kaalinga Narthanan" | "Baby" Jayalakshmi | |
| 13 | "Yogamidhu Rajabogam" | Sahadevan | |
| 14 | "Parimala Mihuvana" | T. R. Mahalingam, N. V. Krishnan | |
| 15 | "Veenaana Peraasai Aagaadhu" | Kali N. Rathnam, C. T. Rajakantham | |
| 16 | "Panchathinaaladi Chinni" | Kali N. Rathnam | |
| 17 | "Kannana Pennaalai" | Kali N. Rathnam, P. S. Gnanam | 2:21 |
| 18 | "Sundari Aananda Bhairavi" | Kali N. Rathnam, V. M. Ezhumalai | 7:01 |
| 19 | "Maaya Vaazhve Paaraai" | P. G. Venkatesan | |
| 20 | "Naame Koodi Naalellam Uzhaithom" | P. G. Venkatesan | |

== Reception ==
Writing in 2014, Randor Guy said the film was only an average success at the box-office. He said, the film is remembered for "The performances by Chinnappa, Perumal, and melodious music and well-choreographed dances."
