= Vikrama Urvashi =

Vikrama Urvashi or Urvasiyin Kaadhal
- Directed by: C. V. Raman
- Screenplay by: G. Sundara Bhagavathar
- Story by: C. V. Raman
- Produced by: R. Sundaram
- Starring: C. V. V. Panthulu; C. S. Sulochana; Kali N. Rathnam; C. T. Rajakantham; G. Ramanathan
- Music by: G. Ramanathan
- Production company: Parimala Pictures
- Distributed by: Modern Theatres
- Release date: 10 October 1940 (India)
- Running time: 187 mins. (16900 ft.)
- Country: India
- Language: Tamil

Vikrama Urvashi or Urvasiyin Kadhal is a 1940 Indian, Tamil-language film directed by C. V. Raman. The film stars C. V. V. Panthulu and C. S. Sulochana. And, the film was produced by Modern Theatres

== Cast ==
The list is adapted from the database of Film News Anandan.

- C. V. V. Panthulu
- C. S. Sulochana
- Kali N. Rathnam
- C. T. Rajakantham
- P. A. Rajamani
- G. Ramanathan
- P. R. Mangalam

== Production ==
As was the custom of the day, the film had an alternate title Urvasiyin Kadhal. The film was the debut as actor and singer for P. A. Periyanayaki who was in her early teens at that time. She later blossomed as an actress and more popularly as a playback singer.

== Soundtrack ==
G. Ramanathan composed the music while the lyrics were written by his elder brother G. Sundara Bhagavathar.

No.	Song	Singer/s	Raga	Duration (m:ss)
1	"Aaruyir Naathan Mananilai Maarida"	P. A. Periyanayaki	Desh	02:42
2	"Varuveer Magizhvudane"	P. A. Periyanayaki	Sindhu Bairavi	02:55
3	"Jagadeeswari Sankari"	P. A. Periyanayaki	Vijayanaghari	03:02
4	"Ennaippole Bhagyavati Yaar"	P. A. Periyanayaki		02:54
5	"Aanandham Idhile"	P. A. Periyanayaki & Puruvarus		02:58

== See also ==
List of Modern Theatres films
