= Maheswari (film) =

- Theatrical release poster
- Directed by: T. R. Raghunath
- Screenplay by: T. R. Raghunath
- Story by: C. V. Sridhar
- Produced by: T. R. Sundaram
- Starring: Savithri; K. A. Thangavelu
- Cinematography: W. R. Subba Rao
- Edited by: L. Balu
- Music by: G. Ramanathan
- Production company: Modern Theatres
- Release date: 13 November 1955
- Running time: 15954 ft.
- Country: India
- Language: Tamil

Maheswari is a 1955 Indian Tamil language film produced by Modern Theatres and directed by T. R. Raghunath. The film stars Gemini Ganesan and Savithri. It was released on 13 November 1955.

== Plot ==
Manickam is wanted by the army of East India Company. He is absconding and takes refuge in the house of Maheswari. Manickam and Maheswari fall in love. Manickam's father Dharmalingam demands a large dowry from Maheswari's mother, Kanthimathi, who somehow manages to give the amount. However, Dharmalingam learns that Kanthimathi is ridiculed by the villagers as a woman of loose moral character. So, he sends back Maheswari to her home. Manickam is helpless because he depends on his father for everything. Kanthimathi kills herself. Maheswari starts looking for a means to earn a living and she comes across Mayathevan, the leader of a gang of robbers who is wanted by the East India Company. She is employed by him as chief assistant. Mayathevan renames Maheswari as Rani Rangamma. Though she lives like a queen, her heart yearns for Manickam. In the meantime, at the insistence of his father, Manickam has married another woman. What happens to Maheswari forms the rest of the story.

== Cast ==
- Savitri as Maheswari
- Gemini Ganesan as Manickam
- K. A. Thangavelu as Dharmalingam, Manickam's father
- Saradamba as Kanthimathi, Maheswari's mother
- N. S. Narayana Pillai as Mayathevan
- M. N. Rajam
- A. Karunanidhi
- C. K. Saraswathi as Kamakshi, Dharmalingam's wife
- P. Dhanam
- O. A. K. Thevar
- T. P. Muthulakshmi

Dance

- Lakshmikantha

== Soundtrack ==
Music was composed by G. Ramanathan. This was the first release for lyricist Pattukkottai Kalyanasundaram.

Song	Singer/s	Lyricist	Length
"Andha Naalum Endha Naalo"	M. L. Vasanthakumari	A. Maruthakasi	03:22
"Aram Kaattha Dheviye"	A. M. Rajah & Jikki	Pattukkottai Kalyanasundaram	03:29
"Azhagu Nilaavin Bavaniyile"	A. M. Rajah & Jikki	Pattukkottai Kalyanasundaram	03:03
"Alli Veesunga Panatthai"	T. V. Rathnam	Pattukkottai Kalyanasundaram	02:13
"Janakku Janakku Jinjanakku"	S. C. Krishnan & A. G. Rathnamala	Pattukkottai Kalyanasundaram	03:28
"Aagaaya Veedhiyile...Paarum Thannaale"	T. V. Rathnam	Pattukkottai Kalyanasundaram	02:39
"Sonna Pothum Kannale"	S. C. Krishnan & A. G. Rathnamala	A. Maruthakasi	03:20
"Mundhi Mundhi Vinaayagane"	S. C. Krishnan & A. G. Rathnamala		05:24
"Maname Niraindha Dheivam"	A. M. Rajah & Jikki		03:29
"Ulagatthu Naayagiye Engal Mutthu Maariyammaa"	A. G. Rathnamala & chorus		04:48

Telugu

For the Telugu-dubbed version Rani Rangamma, the music was composed by S. Dakshinamurthi. All the tunes for all the songs for both languages are the same.

Song	Singer/s	Lyricist	Length
"Shoora Bobbili Seemandhuva"	R. Balasaraswathi Devi	Sri Sri	03:22
			03:29
"Kalalu Tharinchu"	P. B. Sreenivas & S. Janaki	Aarudhra	03:03
"Challi Veyandi Dabbulu Challiveyandi"	T. Sathyavathi	Sri Sri	02:13
"Janka Janaka Jinjankadi"	Pithapuram Nageswara Rao & Swarnalatha	Sri Sri	03:28
"Aakasha Veedhilo...Kalalajaalaalu Pannanela"	T. Sathyavathi	Sri Sri	02:39
"Orachoopu Kannantha Ollu"	P. B. Sreenivas & S. Janaki	Aarudhra	03:20
"Natiroju Yela Radhu"	Pithapuram Nageswara Rao & Swarnalatha	Sri Sri	05:24
"Manapai Shapinche Daivam"	P. B. Sreenivas & S. Janaki	Aarudhra	03:29
"Jayam Nosagu Devatha"	S. Janaki	Aarudhra	04:48

== Reception ==
Maheswari was released on 13 November 1955, and was not a commercial success during its original release.
