= Sakata Yogam =

- Poster
- Directed by: R. Padmanaban
- Screenplay by: P. Neelakantan
- Produced by: R. Padmanaban
- Starring: Kothamangalam Seenu; T. R. Ramachandran; Vidvan Srinivasan; T. S. Durairaj
- Release date: 23 August 1946 (India)
- Running time: 122 mins. (10982 ft.)
- Country: India
- Language: Tamil

Sakata Yogam (transl. Wheel of fortune) is a 1946 Indian Tamil-language film directed by R. Padmanaban. The film stars Kothamangalam Seenu and V. N. Janaki.

== Cast ==
List adapted from the database of Film News Anandan

Male cast

- Kothamangalam Seenu
- T. R. Ramachandran
- Vidvan Srinivasan
- T. S. Durairaj
- Kali N. Rathnam

Female cast

- V. N. Janaki
- Mayavaram Pappa
- P. A. Periyanayaki
- C. T. Rajakantham

== Production ==
The film was produced and directed by R. Padmanaban. P. Neelakantan wrote the screenplay and dialogues. The film was shot at Modern Theatres.

== Soundtrack ==
Lyrics were written by Palavangkudi Sama, S. G. Chellappa Iyer, Udumalai Narayana Kavi and T. K. Sundara Vathiyar. No music composer was credited. 2 songs sung by Kothamangalam Seenu – Bhoomi Iyarkai Kaana Kaana and Kalai Gnaaname Arulvaai became popular.
