= P. A. Periyanayaki =

Tamil playback singer

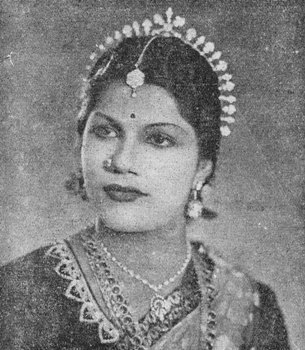
- Born: 14 April 1927; Thiruvadhigai, Panruti, Cuddalore district, Tamil Nadu
- Died: 1990 (aged 62–63)
- Known for: Playback Singer, actress
- Parent: Mother: Adhilakshmi

P. A. Periyanayaki (14 April 1927 – 1990) was Tamil playback singer and actress who worked mainly in Tamil-language films. She also performed stage concerts as a Carnatic singer.

== Early life ==
She hailed from Thiruvadhigai near Panruti. Her mother Adhilakshmi was a singer and was fondly called "Panruti Ammal". Periyanayaki was the youngest of Adhilakshmi's three children. Others are Balasubramanian and Rajamani. Adhilakshmi went to Sri Lanka with her 3 children and performed music concerts there. When her health deteriorated, she returned to India with her children and settled in Chennai.

Periyanayaki studied up to 7th Standard in the C. S. M. School at Thiruvallikeni.

== Film career ==
In 1940, Periyanayaki's sister Rajamani got a chance to act in the Tamil film Urvashiyin Kadhal. Periyanayaki also got the chance to act and sing in that film as a heavenly maiden. So she had to leave the school and had to go to Salem with her mother.

Periyanayaki trained in Carnatic music from her mother and from Pathamadai Sundara Iyer. She performed stage concerts.

She had a voice and singing talent. Therefore, she was able to enter the Tamil Cinema.

In 1941 AVM produced a full-length comedy film Sabapathy. Periyanayaki performs a stage Carnatic music concert as a scene in the film. Apart from that, she sang 2 songs in this film.

She featured in Dharma Veeran (1941), En Manaivi (1942), Manonmani (1942), Panchamirtham (1942), Prabhavathi (1942), Sivalinga Satchi (1942), Mahamaya (1944), Vichitra Vanitha (1947), Vedhala Ulagam (1948), Geetha Gandhi (1949), Krishna Bakthi (1949) and Koondukili (1954).

She lent voice to heroine Rukmini in Sri Valli in 1945 for the first time as a playback singer. She sang all the songs overnight and the technicians had to work round the clock to get them ready for the film.

She featured as Narada in Rukmangadhan and as Satyabhama in Krishna Bakthi.

She featured as the heroine in Ekambavanan (1947).

== Some of her songs ==
- Thiruvadi Malarale – Raga: Desh, Film: Prabhavathi
- Thirumaadhu Valar Ponnaadu, Vellimalaikedhiraai Vilangum Ezhumalaiyaan – Film: Prabhavathi
- Yen Manam Kavarndha – Film: Lavanya (1951) Music: S. V. Venkatraman
- Jeeviya Bhagyame, Vettunda Kaigal, Kanniye Maamari Thaaye, Arul Thaarum Deva Mathaave – Film: Gnana Soundari (1948), Music: S. V. Venkatraman
- Chinthai Arindhu Vaadi – Film: Sri Valli, Lyricist: Papanasam Sivan, Music: R. Sudarsanam
- Neeli Magan Nee Allavo – Raga: Karaharapriya, Film: Malaikkallan
- Jeeva Oliyaaga – Film: Paithiyakaran, (playback for T. A. Mathuram)

== Filmography ==
=== As Singer/Actress ===
Year	Film	Role	Director	Banner	Remarks
1940	Urvashiyin Kadhal		C. V. Raman	Parimala Pictures; Modern Theatres	First film
1940	Uthama Puthiran		T. R. Sundaram	Modern Theatres	
1941	Dharma Veeran		B. Sampathkumar	Modern Theatres	
1942	En Manaivi		Sundar Rao Nadkarni	AVM Productions	not credited in the film
1942	Manonmani		T. R. Sundaram	Modern Theatres	
1942	Panchamirtham		Jithan Banerji	Balaji-Eswar Films	
1942	Sivalinga Satchi		S. Nodani	Modern Theatres	
1944	Mahamaya		T. R. Raghunath	Jupiter Pictures	
1944	Prabhavathi	Kurathi	T. R. Raghunath	Krishna Pictures	
1946	Sakata Yogam		R. Padmanaban	R. Padmanaban	
1947	Ekambavanan		B. N. Rao	Saravanabhava Pictures	Heroine against Kothamangalam Seenu
1947	Vichitra Vanitha		K. Subramanyam	Madras United Artists Corporation	
1948	Vedhala Ulagam		A. V. Meiyappan	AVM Productions	
1949	Geetha Gandhi	Sarada	K. Subramanyam	Madras United Artists Corporation	
1949	Krishna Bakthi	Satyabhama	R. S. Mani	Krishna Pictures	
1954	Koondukili		T. R. Ramanna	R. R. Pictures	

=== As Playback singer ===
Year	Film	Language	Song	Music Director	Co-Singer
1940	Urvashiyin Kadhal	Tamil	Varuveer Magizhvudane	G. Ramanathan	
1940	Urvashiyin Kadhal	Tamil	Aaruyir Naathan Mananilai Maarida	G. Ramanathan	
1940	Urvashiyin Kadhal	Tamil	Aanandham Idhile	G. Ramanathan	Puruvarus
1942	Manonmani	Tamil	Koodik Kondaduvom	T. A. Kalyanam	P. G. Venkatesan
1944	Prabhavathi	Tamil	Thirumaadhu Valar Ponnaadu		
1944	Prabhavathi	Tamil	Vellimalaikedhiraayi Vilangum		
1945	Sri Valli	Tamil	Chinthai Arindhu Vaadi	R. Sudarsanam; Thuraiyur Rajagopala Sarma	
1947	Paithiyakaaran	Tamil	Jeeva Oliyaaga	M. S. Gnanamani	
1948	Gnana Soundari	Tamil	Arul Thaarum Deva Maathaave	S. V. Venkatraman	Jikki
1948	Gnana Soundari	Tamil	Kaadhalitthaalum Inbam Melaam	S. V. Venkatraman	T. R. Mahalingam
1948	Gnana Soundari	Tamil	Mana Mohanane	S. V. Venkatraman	T. R. Mahalingam
1948	Gnana Soundari	Tamil	Jeeviya Bhagyame	S. V. Venkatraman	
1948	Gnana Soundari	Tamil	Vettunda Kaigal	S. V. Venkatraman	
1948	Gnana Soundari	Tamil	Kanniye Maamari Thaaye	S. V. Venkatraman	
1948	Gnana Soundari	Tamil	Enna Payan Adaindhene	S. V. Venkatraman	
1948	Gnana Soundari	Tamil	Kula Maamani	S. V. Venkatraman	
1948	Vedhala Ulagam	Tamil	Azhagumigum Pavalaratham Vaitthu	R. Sudharsanam	
1948	Vedhala Ulagam	Tamil	Ezhil Annam Vadivaagi Eduthheginen	R. Sudharsanam	
1948	Vedhala Ulagam	Tamil	Saantham Kolvaai En Sagodhariye	R. Sudharsanam	
1949	Inbavalli	Tamil	Jagadhaambaa	G. Ramanathan	P. Leela
1949	Inbavalli	Tamil	Anbe Perum Nidhiye	G. Ramanathan	T. R. Mahalingam
1949	Inbavalli	Tamil	Yaar Umai Polae	G. Ramanathan	
1949	Inbavalli	Tamil	Dheiva Sodhanai Thaano	G. Ramanathan	
1949	Inbavalli	Tamil	Innum Vara Kaanene	G. Ramanathan	
1949	Ratnakumar	Tamil	Nam Vaazhvenum Solaiyil	G. Ramanathan & C. R. Subburaman	P. U. Chinnappa
1949	Ratnakumar	Tamil	Aaha Enadi Kiliye	G. Ramanathan & C. R. Subburaman	
1950	Beedala Patlu	Telugu	Chilukaraajaa Neeku Pelli	S. M. Subbaiah Naidu & G. Aswathama	
1950	Beedala Patlu	Telugu		S. M. Subbaiah Naidu & G. Aswathama	Thiruchi Loganathan & M. L. Vasanthakumari
1950	Beedala Patlu	Telugu	Kanikaramadi Kaladeni	S. M. Subbaiah Naidu & G. Aswathama	
1950	Ezhai Padum Padu	Tamil	Oo Kiliye Aasai Kiliye	S. M. Subbaiah Naidu	
1950	Ezhai Padum Padu	Tamil	Vaanamudhe Ondraai	S. M. Subbaiah Naidu	Thiruchi Loganathan & M. L. Vasanthakumari
1950	Ezhai Padum Padu	Tamil	Kanivudan Thirumbiye Paarum	S. M. Subbaiah Naidu	
1950	Ithaya Geetham	Tamil	Juma Juma Jum Jum	S. V. Venkatraman	P. Leela
1950	Ithaya Geetham	Tamil	Janani Sri Goweri Dhesam	S. V. Venkatraman	
1950	Prasanna	Malayalam	Sneham Thookum	M. S. Gnanamani	
1951	Lavanya	Tamil	Idhu Mun Seydha Vinaiyo	S. V. Venkatraman	
1951	Lavanya	Tamil	Yezhai Ennidam Umadhu Manamum	S. V. Venkatraman	
1951	Lavanya	Tamil	Thoodhu Nee Sellaayo Mugile	S. V. Venkatraman	
1951	Sarvadhikari	Tamil	En Andha Kadai Sarakkum	S. Dakshinamurthi	S. Dakshinamurthi
1951	Singari	Tamil	Paalu Paalu Pasum Paalu	T. A. Kalyanam, S. V. Venkatraman & T. R. Ramanathan	P. Leela
1951	Sudharshan	Tamil	Unnai Kandu Mayamngaadha Pergal Undo	G. Ramanathan	
1951	Sudharshan	Tamil	Ulagame Sandhai Koottamada.... Paaril Sandhai Koottam	G. Ramanathan	
1951	Vanasundari	Tamil	Pennin Inbam Naadida Vaareer	S. V. Venkataraman & C. R. Subburaman	K. V. Janaki
1951	Vanasundari	Tamil	Deeyo Deeyo Deeyaalo	S. V. Venkataraman & C. R. Subburaman	K. V. Janaki & P. Leela
1951	Vanasundari	Tamil	Vandu Pola Aadi Sellum Odame	S. V. Venkataraman & C. R. Subburaman	P. Leela
1951	Vanasundari	Tamil	Inbamaaga Paaduvom	S. V. Venkataraman & C. R. Subburaman	P. Leela
1952	Desabhakthan	Malayalam	Sahaayamaare Baale	Shankar-Jaikishan	
1952	Desabhakthan	Malayalam	Oh chinthayil En	Shankar-Jaikishan	
1952	Kanchana	Malayalam	Oh Vaanin Mele	S. M. Subbaiah Naidu	
1952	Kanchana	Malayalam	Niraasha Maathramaay	S. M. Subbaiah Naidu	
1952	Kanchana	Tamil	En Vaazhve Sogam Aaguma	S. M. Subbaiah Naidu	
1952	Kanchana	Tamil	O Aasai Rajaa	S. M. Subbaiah Naidu	
1952	Kanchana	Tamil	Inimel Orupothum	S. M. Subbaiah Naidu	
1952	Kanchana	Tamil	Azhagu Nilaa Vaa Vaa	S. M. Subbaiah Naidu	
1952	Kanchana	Tamil	Chella Kiliye Chezhundhene	S. M. Subbaiah Naidu	
1952	Kanchana	Tamil	Inba Padaginile Thunba Puyal	S. M. Subbaiah Naidu	
1952	Kanchana	Tamil	Ullam Kavarndha En	S. M. Subbaiah Naidu	K. R. Ramaswamy
1952	Kanchana	Telugu	Idenaa Prematirenaa	S. M. Subbaiah Naidu	
1952	Kanchana	Telugu	O Etham Ekkene Tokkedaa	S. M. Subbaiah Naidu	
1952	Puratchi Veeran	Tamil	Kaadhal Kanave.... En Kannil	Shankar-Jaikishan	Thiruchi Loganathan
1952	Puratchi Veeran	Tamil	Men Thendralile	Shankar-Jaikishan	
1952	Puratchi Veeran	Tamil	Thulli Paaru Jodhiyaa	Shankar-Jaikishan	
1952	Puratchi Veeran	Tamil	Un Aasai Maaraadhae	Shankar-Jaikishan	
1952	Singari	Telugu	Palu Palu Moratu Maganike	T. A. Kalyanam, S. V. Venkatraman & T. R. Ramanathan	P. Leela
1953	Ammalakkalu	Telugu	Penugonu Manasula	G. Ramanathan, C. R. Subburaman & Viswanathan-Ramamoorthy	A. M. Rajah
1953	Ammalakkalu	Telugu	Kannemaavi Thotalona	G. Ramanathan, C. R. Subburaman & Viswanathan-Ramamoorthy	A. M. Rajah
1953	Ammalakkalu	Telugu	Oo Neeve Naa Prema	G. Ramanathan, C. R. Subburaman & Viswanathan-Ramamoorthy	A. M. Rajah
1953	Ammalakkalu	Telugu	Maaradavela Maaramu	G. Ramanathan, C. R. Subburaman & Viswanathan-Ramamoorthy	A. M. Rajah
1953	Ammalakkalu	Telugu	Undaloi Undaloi	G. Ramanathan, C. R. Subburaman & Viswanathan-Ramamoorthy	A. P. Komala
1953	Kodarikam	Telugu	Leela Hallo, Leela Open	C. N. Pandurangan	A. P. Komala & U. R. Chandra
1953	Mamiyar	Tamil	Leela Hallo, Leela Open	C. N. Pandurangan	A. P. Komala & U. R. Chandra
1953	Marumagal	Tamil	Kanavilum Nanavilum Inai Piriyaadha	G. Ramanathan, C. R. Subburaman & Viswanathan-Ramamoorthy	A. M. Rajah
1953	Marumagal	Tamil	Chinna Chinna Veedu Katti	G. Ramanathan, C. R. Subburaman & Viswanathan-Ramamoorthy	A. M. Rajah
1953	Marumagal	Tamil	Oo Neethaan En Sondham	G. Ramanathan, C. R. Subburaman & Viswanathan-Ramamoorthy	A. M. Rajah
1953	Marumagal	Tamil	Pesaadha Maounam Aamo	G. Ramanathan, C. R. Subburaman & Viswanathan-Ramamoorthy	A. M. Rajah
1953	Marumagal	Tamil	Aanukkoru Penn Pillai	G. Ramanathan, C. R. Subburaman & Viswanathan-Ramamoorthy	A. P. Komala & A. G. Rathnamala
1953	Marumagal	Tamil	Laali Suba Laali	G. Ramanathan, C. R. Subburaman & Viswanathan-Ramamoorthy	C. R. Subburaman
1953	Ponni	Tamil	Aangalai Pola Penngal	S. M. Subbaiah Naidu	
1953	Ponni	Tamil	Madhimuga Radhi Ena	S. M. Subbaiah Naidu	
1953	Ponni	Tamil	Aaduvome Oonjal Aaduvome (Baama Vijayam dance drama)	S. M. Subbaiah Naidu	(Radha) Jayalakshmi, C. B. Radha and & A. P. Komala
1953	Prapancham	Telugu		M. S. Gnanamani & T. Poornananda	
1953	Ulagam	Tamil	Thetkathi Kallanadaa	M. S. Gnanamani	
1954	Aggi Ramudu	Telugu	Raa Raa Yashodanandana	S. M. Subbaiah Naidu	
1954	Aggi Ramudu	Telugu	Panthulu Panthulu	S. M. Subbaiah Naidu	
1954	Koondukkili	Tamil	Yaar Vanthennai Edhirtthaalum	K. V. Mahadevan	
1954	Koondukkili	Tamil	Enakku Theriyala Nijama	K. V. Mahadevan	
1954	Kudumbam	Tamil	Pudhumalar Roja Naaney	S. Rajeswara Rao	
1954	Malaikkallan	Tamil	Neeli Magan Nee Allavaa	S. M. Subbaiah Naidu	
1954	Malaikkallan	Tamil	O Ammaa O Aiyaa	S. M. Subbaiah Naidu	
1954	Nanban	Tamil		G. Ramanathan	
1955	Doctor Savithri	Tamil	Naayagar Pakshamadi	G. Ramanathan	A. P. Komala
1955	Gomathiyin Kaadhalan	Tamil		G. Ramanathan	
