= V. M. Ezhumalai =

Indian actor

- V. M. Ezhumalai in the film Digambara Samiyar
- Occupation: actor
- Years active: 1937-1962

V. M. Ezhumalai was an Indian actor and comedian who featured in Tamil language films. He was active in the field from 1937 till 1962. He had a style of his own, making viewers laugh by his body language and voice. Ezhumalai emphasized his unique style in a comedy duet Kooja kooja kooja for which he lip-synched with another comedian, A. Karunanidhi, in the 1954 movie Mangalyam. From this song, the word 'kooja' (literally, a bucket carrying drinking water) became a derisive euphemism for servile, spineless bucket carriers to power holders.

Ezhumalai started his career on stage and then switched to films. During the early days he was employed on a monthly salary at Modern Theatres, Salem along with other comedians like Kali N. Rathnam and A. Karunanidhi.

== Filmography ==
Year	Film	Role
1937	Vallala Maharaja	
1939	Sirikkadhe	
1940	Rajayogam	
1941	Dayalan	
1942	Sathi Sukanya	
1942	Naadaga Medai	
1943	Diwan Bahadur	
1945	Burma Rani	
1947	Kannika	
1948	Senbagavalli	
1948	Kaamavalli	
1948	Adhithan Kanavu	Singaram
1949	Vaazhkai	Asampavitham
1950	Digambara Samiyar	Sundaram Pillai
1951	Devaki	
1952	Zamindar	
1953	Madana Mohini	
1953	Ponni	Sokkan
1953	Naalvar	
1954	Nallakalam	
1954	Mangalyam	
1954	Malaikkallan	Chadaiyan
1954	Koondukkili	
1955	Missiamma	School Teacher, Native Physician
1955	Pennarasi	
1955	Guna Sundari	
1956	Naan Petra Selvam	Poyyamozhi
1956	Kokilavani	
1957	Makkalai Petra Magarasi	
1957	Maya Bajaar	Chinnamaya
1957	Pathini Deivam	
1958	Nalla Idathu Sammandham	
1958	Kadan Vaangi Kalyaanam	Subbaiah
1958	Athisaya Thirudan	
1958	Illarame Nallaram	
1959	Kalaivaanan	Maari
1961	Panam Panthiyile	
1962	Ellorum Vazhavendum	
