= Prabhavathi =

1944 film by T. R. Raghunath

- Theatrical release poster
- Directed by: T. R. Raghunath
- Produced by: Lena Chettiar
- Starring: C. Honnappa Bhagavathar; S. P. L. Dhanalakshmi
- Production company: Krishna Pictures
- Distributed by: Murugan Talkies
- Release date: 6 August 1944
- Country: India
- Language: Tamil

Prabhavathi is a 1944 Indian Tamil-language Hindu mythological film directed by T. R. Raghunath and produced by Lena Chettiar. The film stars Honnappa Bhagavathar and S. P. L. Dhanalakshmi. It was released on 6 August 1944, and was not commercially successful.

== Plot ==
The film revolves around the Hindu god Krishnan, his son Pradyumnan, the sage Naradar and his mischief-making activities. Pradyumnan is cursed by a sage into becoming a woman. How he is relieved of the curse due to Krishnan's involvement, and how Pradyumnan and his love interest Mayavathi are reunited forms the bulk of the story.

== Cast ==
Male cast

- C. Honnappa Bhagavathar as Pradyumnan
- M. S. Saroja as Sri Krishnan
- N. S. Krishnan as Haridas
- K. Mahadevan Iyer as Naradar
- R. Balasubramaniam as Durvasar
- D. Balasubramaniam as Vajranabhan
- M. Lakshmanan as Indran
- T. R. Ramachandran as Bhadaranadan
- T. V. Namasivayam as Vishvamitrar
- V. Krishnan as Lakshmanan
- S. V. Sahasranamam as Shivan
- S. R. Swami as Brahma
- E. R. Sahadevan as Sunabhan
- Velayum as Kumbhanabhan
- Kolathu Mani as Pujari
- Pulimootai Ramaswami Iyer as Asurar
- Thiruvenkitam as Asurar
- Kuppusami as Asurar
- Shankaramoorthi as Asurar
- Chellamuthu as Asurar
- Krishnamoorthi as Asurar
- Chinnasami as Asurar
- Gopal as Asurar

Female cast

- S. P. L. Dhanalakshmi as Prabhavathi
- T. R. Rajakumari as Mayavathi
- T. A. Mathuram as Chitralekha
- T. S. Krishna Veni as Rukmani
- P. A. Periyanayaki as Kurathi
- P. A. Rajamani as Satyabhama
- A. R. Sakunthala as Ahalikai
- K. R. Chellam as Shakthi
- R. Padma as Rajahamsi
- Rathnam as Indrani
- T. A. Jayalakshmi as Dancer
- K. R. Jayalakshmi as Dancer
- K. S. Adilakshmi as Dancer
- K. S. Rajam as Dancer
- S. Saraswathi as Dancer
- V. S. Chitti Ammal as Dancer
- R. N. Dhanabhagyam as Dancer

Supporting cast

- T. D. Krishna Bai
- T. D. Kamala Bai
- P. S. Chandra
- V. Lakshmikantham

== Production ==
Prabhavathi was directed by T. R. Raghunath and produced by Lena Chettiar, under the production banner Krishna Pictures. Krishna, a male character, was played by Raghunath's wife M. S. Saroja.

== Soundtrack ==
Song	Singer	Length
"Jegathambikaiye"	S. P. L. Dhanalakshmi	02:47
"Neeyethunai Devathi Deva"	K. Mahadevan Iyer	
"Nallor Paninthida Ullang Kaninthidum"	K. Mahadevan Iyer	
"Varuvare Varuvare"	T. R. Rajakumari	
"Engum Eppozhutham Vilaiyatta"	C. Honnappa Bhagavathar, K. Mahadevan Iyer, T. R. Rajakumari	
"Karthikai Vilakku"	T. A. Mathuram	
"Ododi Vasantham Poovodu Sambandam"	T. R. Rajakumari, C. Honnappa Bhagavathar	
"Kanatha Kashikanden"	S. P. L. Dhanalakshmi	02:20
"Gomatha Neeye Adharame Shri Gomatha"	T. R. Rajakumari	
"Thiruvadi Malarale Ezhai"	A. R. Sakunthala	
"Mathival Yar Chollum Mathavame"	Background Music	
"Vanithaiyivil Gauthaman Manaivirama"	T. V. Namasivayam	
"Usiravangathe Yindha Odambu Thangadhe"	N. S. Krishnan, T. A. Mathuram	02:50
"Nilavo Alathu Mugamo"	C. Honnappa Bhagavathar, S. P. L. Dhanalakshmi	
"Maran Varuki"	Dance Music	
"Marumalithai Soodumthirumal Magan Enge"	T. R. Rajakumari	
"Thirumathu Valar Ponnadu Ennadu"	P. A. Periyanayaki	
"Vellimalai Kethirai"	P. A. Periyanayaki	02:50
"Chandravathana Enthanmathana"	S. P. L. Dhanalakshmi, C. Honnappa Bhagavathar	
"En Thadumarugindrai"	K. Mahadevan Iyer	02:24
"Chithamirangatha Madha"	C. Honnappa Bhagavathar	02:45
"Vanavargal Thuyartheera Makitasarar"	C. Honnappa Bhagavathar	

== Release and reception ==
Prabhavathi was released on 6 August 1944, and was distributed by Murugan Talkies. The film was not a commercial success, but film historian Randor Guy said it would be "Remembered for being one of the early movies of the glamour girl Rajakumari".
