= Thulasi Jalandar =

1947 Tamil film by K. B. Nagabhushanam

- Directed by: K. B. Nagabhushanam
- Written by: T. C. Vadivelu Naikkar
- Story by: T. C. Vadivelu Naikkar
- Produced by: K. B. Nagabhushanam
- Starring: P. U. Chinnappa; P. Kannamba; S. Varalakshmi
- Cinematography: Thambu (C. V. Ramakrishnan)
- Edited by: N. K. Gopal
- Music by: M. D. Parthasarathy
- Production company: Raja Rajeswari Films
- Distributed by: Raja Rajeswari Films
- Release date: 11 August 1947 (India)
- Running time: 149 mins.
- Country: India
- Language: Tamil

Thulasi Jalandar is a 1947 Indian, Tamil language film directed by K. B. Nagabhushanam. The film featured P. U. Chinnappa, P. Kannamba, Kothamangalam Seenu and T. S. Jaya in the lead roles.

== Cast ==
The following list was adapted from the database of Film News Anandan

Male cast

- P. U. Chinnappa
- Kothamangalam Seenu
- T. S. Durairaj
- R. Balasubramaniam

Female cast

- P. Kannamba
- S. Varalakshmi
- T. S. Jaya
- Rushyendramani

== Production ==
The film was produced by K. B. Nagabhushanam under the banner Raja Rajeswari Films owned by him and his wife P. Kannamba. He also directed the film. The story and dialogues were written by T. C. Vadivelu Naikkar. Cinematography was done by Thambu (C. V. Ramakrishnan) while the editing was done by N. K. Gopal. Sekar and Saama were in charge of art direction. Somu and Gopal handled the still photography. The film was made at the Gemini Studios.

== Soundtrack ==
The music was composed by M. D. Parthasarathy while the lyrics were penned by Papanasam Sivan.
