= Nanban =

Nanban may refer to:

== Japan ==
- Nanban art, Japanese art of the sixteenth and seventeenth centuries influenced by contact with Europeans
- Nanban trade, trade between Japan and Western countries from 1543 to 1614

== Entertainment ==
- Nanban (1954 film), 1954 Indian Tamil-language film
- Nanban (2012 film), 2012 Indian Tamil-language film by S. Shankar
