= Adhithan Kanavu =

1948 Tamil film directed by T. R. Sundaram

- Theatrical release poster
- Directed by: T. R. Sundaram
- Produced by: T. R. Sundaram
- Starring: T. R. Mahalingam; Anjali Devi; M. G. Chakrapani; Kali N. Rathnam; C. T. Rajakantham
- Edited by: L. Balu
- Music by: G. Ramanathan
- Production company: Modern Theatres
- Release date: 11 December 1948
- Country: India
- Language: Tamil

Adhithan Kanavu (transl. Adhithan's dream) is an Indian Tamil language film directed and produced by T. R. Sundaram. The film stars T. R. Mahalingam and Anjali Devi. It was released on 11 December 1948.

== Plot ==
Two cousins serves as commanders in the army of a Kingdom. They make an agreement. When they marry and have children, if one gets a son and the other a daughter, then the children should marry each other. However, due to some differences, the cousins parted from each other and one of them leaves the country. Both of them marry and in due course both beget children. A boy to one and a girl to the other. The children grow up in different places. One day Gandharvas (heavenly beings) bring them together and they marry according to Gandharva custom. The Gandharvas then take both to their respective homes. This happens during the night. The following morning the man goes in search of his sweetheart. The girl becomes pregnant and undergoes severe harassment. A song, taught to the man by his mother, becomes the clue and brings back the estranged families back together.

== Cast ==
The list was compiled from The Hindu review of the film and from the database of Film News Anandan.

- T. R. Mahalingam
- Anjali Devi
- T. R. Rajani
- K. P. Kesavan
- M. G. Chakrapani
- Kali N. Rathnam
- C. T. Rajakantham
- Jayagowri
- A. Karunanidhi

Dance:

- Lalitha-Padmini
- Choreography by Vazhuvoor B. Ramaiyah Pillai and Sinha

== Soundtrack ==
Music was composed by G. Ramanathan and the lyrics were penned by Papanasam Sivan and his brother Papanasam Rajagopala Iyer. The song "Madhuramaana Rusi Ullathe" attained popularity.

Song	Singer
Madhuramaana Rusi Ullathe	T. R. Mahalingam & Soolamangalam Jayalakshmi

== Reception ==
The film fared well at the box-office.
