= Maya Mayavan =

1938 film by B. Sampathkumar

- Poster
- Directed by: B. Sampathkumar
- Written by: S. Velusami
- Produced by: T. R. Sundaram
- Starring: T. K. Sampangi; J. Susheela Devi; K. Kokila; G. R. Varadachar
- Music by: G. Rajagopal Naidu; S. Velusami
- Production company: Modern Theatres
- Release date: 22 October 1938
- Country: India
- Language: Tamil

Maya Mayavan (transl. Magical Krishna) is a 1938 Indian Tamil-language action thriller film directed by B. Sampathkumar and produced by T. R. Sundaram of Modern Theatres. It stars T. K. Sampangi, J. Susheela Devi, K. Kokila and G. R. Varadachar. It was released on 22 October 1938.

== Plot ==
Sabapathy Mudaliar, a wolf in sheep's clothing and womaniser, lusts for a young woman named Indira, and tries to make her his own by any means possible, despite already having a mistress who is a dancer named Sundari. Jagadish, a detective, decides to save Indira, with whom he becomes hopelessly enamored. The duo faces many obstacles from Sabapathy and his partners in crime. But by utilising his investigative abilities, he succeeds in saving his lover and the two marry.

== Cast ==
Cast adapted from the film's songbook:

- T. K. Sampangi as Jagadish (Detective Officer)
- Miss K. Kokila as Indira
- Miss J. Susheela Devi as Sundari
- Miss Seetha Bai as Shantha & Female Dancer
- G. R. Varadachari as Sir Sabapathy Mudaliar
- K. Kaveri Chettiar as Diwan Bahadur Shivasankara Mudaliar
- Venugopala Sharma as Kittu
- Venu Chetti as Pattu
- Devaraju as Munusami
- V. V. S. Mani as Neliyan

Group of Bandits

- Anthonisami
- Deivadhanavel
- Somasundaran
- Lakshminarayanan
- Appavu Pillai

== Production ==
Maya Mayavan was produced by T. R. Sundaram under his Salem-based production company Modern Theatres. It was directed by B. Sampathkumar and written by S. Velsamy Kavi. The length of the film was 15500 feet.

== Soundtrack ==
The music of the film was composed by G. Rajagopal Naidu. S. Velusami wrote the lyrics. The singers were Miss K. Kokila, Miss J. Susheela Devi, Venugopala Sharma, Venu Chetti, and T. K. Sampangi. P. G. Venkatesan, popularly known as the "Saigal of South India", worked as a playback singer on two of the songs.

Orchestra

- Rajagopal Naidu – Fiddle
- Ibrahim – Organ & Piano
- K. Rangaiah Naidu – Clarinet
- T. P. Chinaiah – Tabla

No.	Song	Singer/s
1	Thyagabuvani Bharath Devi	P. G. Venkatesan
2	Malai Neram Manoharantharumam Kalam	Miss K. Kokila
3	Loka Nayaga Mathiya Kanthi	Miss K. Kokila
4	Manilameede Jananamalame	Miss J. Susheela Devi
5	Urargal Thetum Chothu Ellame Namekku (Lion Dance)	Chorus
6	Kamavathana Radhai Sukuna	Miss J. Susheela Devi
7	Kulavi Guti Maygadal Peruvome	T. K. Sampangi, Miss K. Kokila
8	Vazhvithu Thane Uzhvinai Kane	P. G. Venkatesan
9	Alankaraganne Kaicharasi...Nay-Lattu Poori	Venugopala Sharma, Venu Chetti
10	Ika Loka Vazhvile	Miss J. Susheela Devi

== Release and reception ==
Maya Mayavan was released on 22 October 1938. According to film historian Randor Guy, the film did "not leave much of an impact on viewers", but he said it would be remembered for "interesting storyline, exciting car chases on lonely highways, kidnappings and thrilling sequences, rarely seen in Tamil Cinema of that era."
