= Singari =

- Theatrical release poster
- Directed by: T. R. Raghunath
- Screenplay by: T. R. Raghunath
- Story by: V. S. Venkatachalam
- Starring: T. R. Ramachandran; Lalitha; Padmini
- Cinematography: P. S. Selvaraj
- Edited by: S. A. Murugesan
- Music by: S. V. Venkatraman; T. R. Ramanathan; T. A. Kalyanam
- Production company: National Productions
- Distributed by: Kumaravel Pictures
- Release date: 29 October 1951
- Country: India
- Language: Tamil

Singari is a 1951 Indian Tamil language comedy film directed by T. R. Raghunath. The film stars T. R. Ramachandran, Lalitha and Padmini. It was released on 29 October 1951.

== Plot ==
A young man (Nayagam) is wrongly convicted for a bank robbery and sentenced to seven years in prison. His young daughter, who is left all alone, is involved in a car accident. The car owner, a rich man, (Balasubramaniam) brings her up as his own, changing her name (Padmini). A college-going girl (Lalitha) drawn to the world of entertainment runs away from home and joins a drama troupe run by TRR assisted by a crooked manager (T. K. Ramachandran). Sahasranamam (the rich man's son) is thrown out of the house by his father because of his insistence on going abroad for further studies. The father goes on a long pilgrimage. Sahasranamam returns home and meets Padmini who is drawn to him. However, he goes around with the stage actor (Lalitha), creating much gossip. Indeed T. R. Ramachandran is in love with her. Complications ensue and, in the end, it turns out that the young women are the daughters of two brothers and the two couples marry and live happily.

== Cast ==
Adapted from the opening credits of the film

Male cast

- T. R. Ramachandran
- S. V. Sahasranamam
- D. Balasubramaniam
- T. K. Ramachandran
- V. K. Ramasamy
- C. V. Nayagam
- C. S. Pandian
- T. V. Radhakrishnan
- Thangavelu

Female cast

- Lalitha
- Padmini
- Ragini
- N. R. Leela
- Nirmala
- M. M. Radha Bai
- C. K. Saraswathi
- M. S. S. Bhagyam

== Soundtrack ==
Music was composed by 3 music directors – T. A. Kalyanam, S. V. Venkatraman and T. R. Ramanathan. The following list of songs is adapted from the book authored by K. Neelamegam.

Song	Singer/s	Lyricist	Composer	Duration (m:ss)
"Sudhdham Seyyanum"	Jikki	Kannadasan	T. A. Kalyanam	02:58
"Paalu Paalu Pasum Paalu"	P. A. Periyanayaki & P. Leela	Thanjai N. Ramaiah Dass	T. A. Kalyanam	04:27
"Kani Suvai Tharum Amudhaave"	Thiruchi Loganathan & Jikki	Thanjai N. Ramaiah Dass	T. A. Kalyanam	
"Ezhaigal Vaazhave Idamillaiyaa"	Thiruchi Loganathan	Thanjai N. Ramaiah Dass	T. A. Kalyanam	
"Maaname Pradhaaname"	Thiruchi Loganathan	Thanjai N. Ramaiah Dass	T. A. Kalyanam	02:49
"Oru Jaan Vayire Illaattaa"	K. N. Reddy, K. Rani	Thanjai N. Ramaiah Dass	S. V. Venkatraman	03:56
"Jighu Jighu Samakku Paarungo"	P. Leela	Thanjai N. Ramaiah Dass	S. V. Venkatraman	01:56
"O! Chellaiah Nee Vallaiah"	P. Leela	Thanjai N. Ramaiah Dass	S. V. Venkatraman	
"Urum Sadhamalla Uttrarum"	C. S. Pandian	Thanjai N. Ramaiah Dass	S. V. Venkatraman	
"Kaanil Vennilaa Poleh"	P. Leela	Thanjai N. Ramaiah Dass	S. V. Venkatraman	02:34
"Kohnaadha Marathinile"	K. H. Reddy, K. Rani	Thanjai N. Ramaiah Dass	S. V. Venkatraman	01:10
"Bhaarathi Enge Solladi"	P. Leela	Thanjai N. Ramaiah Dass	S. V. Venkatraman	
"Ottai Pallai Kaatiye"		Thanjai N. Ramaiah Dass	S. V. Venkatraman	
"Vaanavillaipoleh Oru Vaaliban"	P. Leela	K. P. Kamatchi Sundaram	S. V. Venkatraman	02:56

== Reception ==
Film historian Randor Guy wrote in 2011 that the film was remembered for its storyline, music, song, dances and the remarkable performance of artistes like Sahasranamam, Lalitha, Padmini, D. Balasubramaniam and Kaka Radhakrishnan.

== Legacy ==
Comedian K. A. Thangavelu came to be known as Danaal Thangavelu because he used the phrase Danaal Danaal in his dialogues in this film.
