= Yar Manamagan? =

- Theatrical release poster
- Directed by: P. Subramaniam
- Written by: Muttathu Varkey
- Produced by: P. Subramaniam
- Starring: T. K. Balachandran; V. K. Ramasamy; Kumari K. V. Janaki
- Cinematography: N. S. Mani
- Edited by: K. D. George
- Music by: Br Lakshmanan
- Production company: Neela Productions
- Release date: 22 September 1961
- Country: India
- Language: Tamil

Yar Manamagan? (transl. Who is the Bridegroom?) is a 1961 Indian Tamil-language film produced and directed by P. Subramaniam. The film stars T. K. Balachandran and Kumari K. V. Janaki. It was released on 22 September 1961.

Th film was also made in Malayalam as Christmas Rathri.

== Cast ==
The list is adapted from Thiraikalanjiyam Part2.

Male cast

- T. K. Balachandran
- V. K. Ramasamy
- Kallapart Natarajan
- D. Balasubrmaniam
- C. S. Pandian

Female cast

- Kumari K. V. Shanthi
- Thilagam
- C. R. Rajakumari
- C. K. Saraswathi

== Production ==
The film was produced and directed by P. Subramaniam and was made in Malayalam titled Christmas Rathri.

== Soundtrack ==
Music was composed by Br Lakshmanan.

Song	Singer/s	Lyricist	Duration (m:ss)
"Kadalamma Kadalamma"	Thiruchi Loganathan, P. Leela, Renuka & group	Sundarakannan	
"Konjam Siringa, Konjam Siringa"	S. C. Krishnan & K. Jamuna Rani	Sundarakannan	
"Kum Kuma Kuma Romba Vegama"	P. B. Srinivas & K. Jamuna Rani	Sundarakannan	
"Manasuketha Manmadhan Varuvaaru"	P. Leela & Renuka	Ku. Ma. Balasubramaniam	
"Nilavil Malarum Kumudham"	A. P. Komala	Ku. Ma. Balasubramaniam	
"Aanazhage Vaanamudhe"	A. M. Rajah & P. Leela	Ku. Ma. Balasubramaniam	03:06
"Kaadhalenum Veenaithanai Geetham Paada"	A. M. Rajah & P. Leela	Ku. Ma. Balasubramaniam	

== Reception ==
The Indian Express wrote, "Except for the didactic nature of the proceedings, the technical values of the film are better than those of many others in its class".
