= Vedhala Ulagam =

1948 Tamil film by A. V. Meiyappan

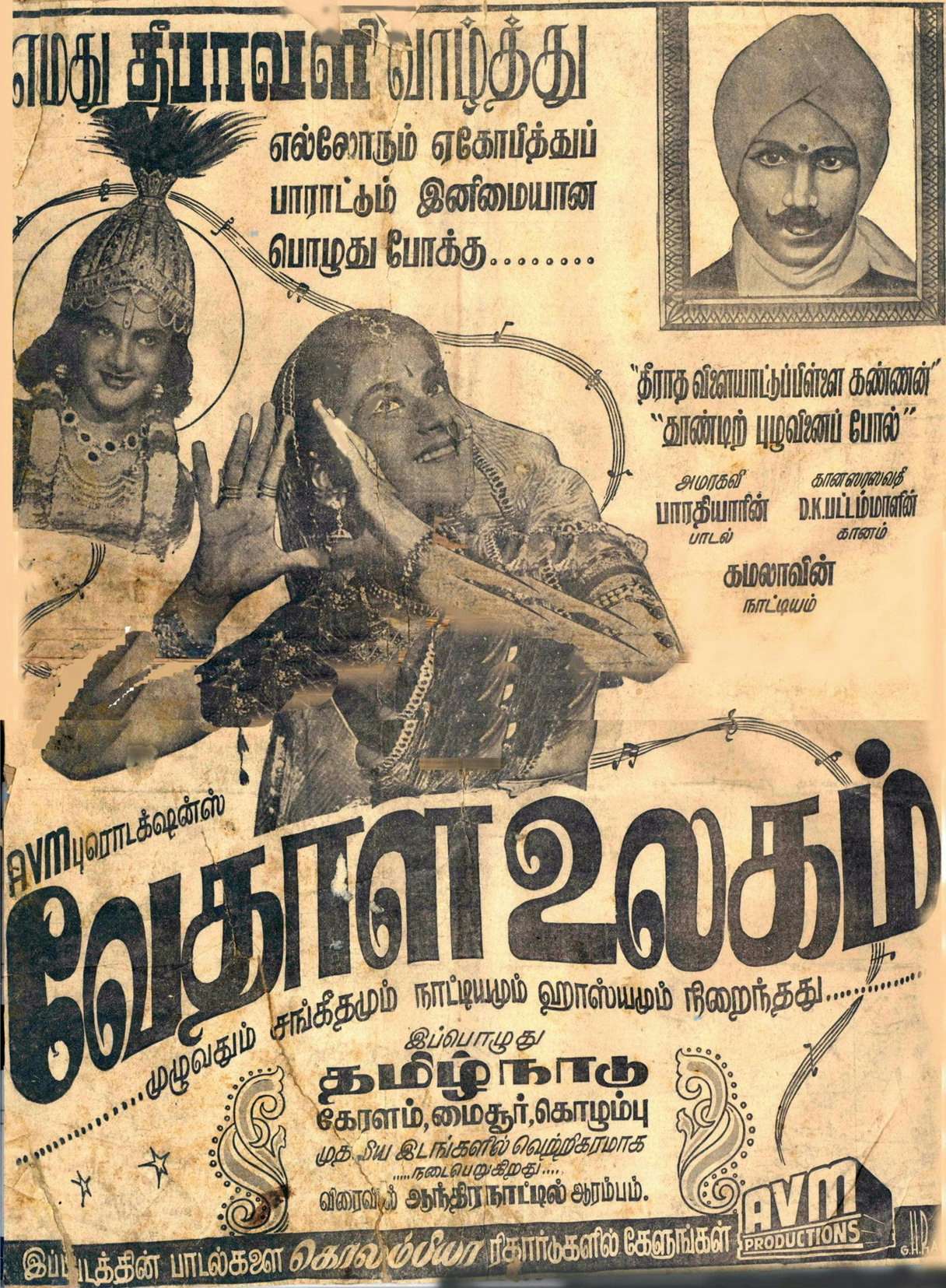
- Theatrical poster
- Directed by: A. V. Meiyappan
- Screenplay by: P. Neelakantan
- Based on: Vedhala Ulagam by Pammal Sambandha Mudaliar
- Produced by: A. V. Meiyappan
- Starring: T. R. Mahalingam; Mangalam
- Cinematography: T. Muthusamy
- Edited by: M. V. Raman
- Music by: R. Sudarsanam
- Production company: AVM Productions
- Release date: 15 August 1948
- Running time: 160 minutes
- Country: India
- Language: Tamil

Vedhala Ulagam (transl. Demon Land) is a 1948 Indian Tamil-language fantasy comedy film directed and produced by A. V. Meiyappan, and written by P. Neelakantan. Adapted from a Pammal Sambandha Mudaliar play of the same name, the film stars T. R. Mahalingam, K. Sarangapani, Mangalam, K. R. Chellam and C. T. Rajakantham. It was released on 11 August 1948 and became a commercial success.

== Plot ==
Rajasimhan has spent time with his companion, Dhathan. One day he goes into the queen's puja room and looks at the book of Demon World. In it, the demon king gives three orders and if one fulfilled these orders, he would give them his kingdom and his young daughter Rajeevi. Rajasimhan is fascinated by the image of Rajeevi in the book. Rajasimhan learns from his mother that his father went to the demon world 18 years ago and was cursed when he tried to rescue all of the men who had failed to fulfill the king's orders. With his mother's permission, Rajasimhan goes with Dhathan to the demon world to rescue his father. With Rajeevi's help, she and Rajasimhan meet. The demon queen, Komati Devi sends Rajeevi into the torture chamber to save Rajasimhan. Rajasimhan and Dhathan are given one order after another.

== Cast ==
Male cast

- T. R. Mahalingam as Rajasimhan
- K. Sarangapani as Dhathan
- R. Balasubramaniam as Mahendran
- G. M. Basheer as Commander
- Kulathu Mani as Vedhala Leader
- M. Vishwanathan as Kannan
- D. B. Ramachandran as Arjunan
- D. B. Bhairavan

Female cast

- Mangalam as Rajeevi
  (Yoga-Mangalam)
- K. R. Chellam as Mohanavalli
- C. T. Rajakantham as Komathi
- B. Chandra as Kumudasundari
- Pandari Bai as Kali Devi
- A. S. Jaya
- Kanthimathi

Dances by

- Baby Rhadha as Radhai
- Kumari Kamala
- Lalitha-Padmini
- Thara Chowdry

== Production ==
Vedhala Ulagam was adapted by P. Neelakantan from the fantasy play of the same name written by Pammal Sambandha Mudaliar. The film was entirely shot at AVM Studios, with sets built by A. Balu and it was the first film to be filmed inside that studio. Some parts of the film were shot with T. A. Jayalakshmi, but she was ultimately replaced by Mangalam of the Yoga-Mangalam dancer duo. The dance sequence of Kumari Kamala, Lalitha, Padmini and Tara Choudary was choreographed by Vazhuvoor Ramaiah Pillai. While the film was predominantly black and white, the last sequence was hand-tinted in colour. Cinematography was handled by T. Muthusamy, and editing by M. V. Raman.

== Soundtrack ==
The soundtrack was composed by R. Sudarasanam and lyrics written by Mahakavi Subramaniya Bharathiyar, K. D. Santhanam, Papanasam Sivan and N. Raghavan. The song "Ayyaya Paarkka Kannu Koosuthey" is based on the Brazilian singer Carmen Miranda's "I, Yi, Yi, Yi, Yi (I Like You Very Much)". Four poems by Bharathiyar were also featured in the film: "Kalviyil Sirantha Thamizh Nadu", "Thoondir Puzhuvinai Pol", "Odi Vilayadu Pappa" and "Theeratha Villayattu Pillai".

Song	Singer	Lyrics	Length
"Kalviyil Sirantha Thamizh Nadu"	T. R. Mahalingam	Mahakavi Subramaniya Bharathiyar	4:59
"Mahaasugidha Rooba Sundhari"	T. R. Mahalingam		3:02
"Magaanaaga Sundhara Mana Mohanan"	T. S. Bhagavathi		3:00
"Satthiyam Seidhu Tharuven"	K. Sarangapani		0:36
"Senthazhavum Vennilave"	T. R. Mahalingam & T. S. Bhagavathi		6:45
"Anandham Aanen Naan Aahaa"	M. S. Rajeswari		2:36
"Solai Azhaginil Maalai Vasandhame"	T. S. Bhagavathi		3:02
"Aiyaiyaiya Paarkka Kannu Koosudhe"	K. Sarangapani		2:22
"Thoondir Puzhuvinai Pol"	D. K. Pattammal	Mahakavi Subramaniya Bharathiyar	3:59
"Adhi Parashakthi"	T. R. Mahalingam		2:26
"Aaraa Inbam Thandhaai"	T. S. Bhagavathi		2:22
"Pavalakodi Nadagam" * "Podhumpom Unadhu Premaiyai" * "Azhagumigum Pavalaratham Vaitthu" * "Gopiyar Konjum Ramanaa" * "Aadum Mayil Paadum Kuyil" * "Velaar Vizhi Maadhai Manam Seiya" * "Ezhil Annam Vadivaagi Eduthheginen" * "Iravinile Vandhaan Inba Sugam" * "Saantham Kolvaai En Sagodhariye" * "Odi Vilayadu Pappa"	* T. S. Bhagavathi * P. A. Periyanayaki * T. V. Rathnam * M. S. Rajeswari * T. V. Rathnam * P. A. Periyanayaki * M. S. Rajeswari * P. A. Periyanayaki * T. S. Bhagavathi & M. S. Rajeswari	* * * * * * * * * Mahakavi Subramaniya Bharathiyar	14:01 * * * 02:12 * 01:46 * 01:20 * 01:32 * 01:56 * 01:31 * 03:08
"Un Manam Kalangatho"	T. R. Mahalingam		2:21
"Vasam Ulla Pooparipene"	T. S. Bhagavathi & M. S. Rajeswari		8:20
"Theeratha Villayattu Pillai"	D. K. Pattammal	Mahakavi Subramaniya Bharathiyar	5:17
"Dhayai Purivai"; Kambhoji Ragam	T. R. Mahalingam	Papanasam Sivan	2:53

== Release and reception ==
Vedhala Ulagam was released on 11 August 1948. The last sequence in colour drew large crowds because such coloured sequences in Tamil films were rarities then, and the film became a commercial success.
