= Shantha Sakku Bai =

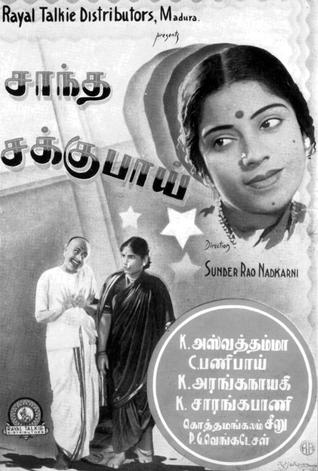
- Film poster
- Directed by: Sundar Rao Nadkarni
- Screenplay by: A. A. Somayajulu; Kothamangalam Subbu
- Starring: K. Aswathamma, K. Sarangapani
- Cinematography: Jiten Banerji
- Edited by: Sundar Rao Nadkarni
- Music by: Thuraiyur Rajagopala Sarma
- Production companies: Rayal Talkie Distributors, Madurai
- Release date: 22 October 1939 (India)
- Country: India
- Language: Tamil

Shantha Sakku Bai is a 1939 Indian, Tamil-language film directed by Sundar Rao Nadkarni. The film featured K. Aswathamma, Banni Bai, K. Sarangapani, Kothamangalam Seenu, and Kothamangalam Subbu in the main roles.

== Plot ==
Sakku Bai is a devotee of Lord Krishna of Pandarpur. She is married to an innocent person who is a 'mama's boy.' The mother-in-law ill-treats Sakku Bai. Lord Krishna comes to the rescue of his devotee. In some scenes Lord Krishna himself appears as Sakku Bai and does all the household work as instructed by the mother-in-law

== Cast ==
The list is adapted from the film titles. (See External links)

Female cast

- K. Aswathamma as Sakku Bai
- C. Pani Bai as Mother-in-law
- K. Aranganayagi as Girija Bai
- S. S. Rajamani as Rukmini
- T. S. Krishnaveni as Kamala

Male cast

- K. Sarangapani as Sarangapani
- Kothamangalam Seenu as Dhasari
- Kothamangalam Subbu as Father-in-law
- M. A. Ganapathy Bhatt as Sri Krishnan
- P. G. Venkatesan as Subbu Chetty
- M. R. Saminathan as Kamala's Husband

== Production ==
The film was produced under the banner Rayal Talkies Distributors Ltd. and was directed by Sundar Rao Nadkarni. A. A. Somayajulu and Kothamangalam Subbu wrote the dialogues to the story based on a Marathi folk tale. Jiten Banerji handled the cinematography while the editing was done by Sundar Rao Narkarni. Art direction was done by F. Nagoor and H. Shantharam. Audiography was handled by Dinshaw K. Tehrani. The film was produced and processed at Newtone Studios, Madras. Processing was done by Bhuban Kar. (Details from film title)

The music director Rajagopala Sarma and Director Sundar Rao Nadkarni appeared in some scenes as devotees of Lord Krishna of Pandarpur.

== Soundtrack ==
The music was composed by Thuraiyur Rajagopala Sarma while the lyrics were penned by Papanasam Sivan and Papanasam Rajagopala Iyer. Background music was provided by Saraswathi Stores orchestra.

Orchestra

P. Doraiappa Bhagavathar - Gottu (kōṭṭu)
T. K. Jayaramaiyer - Violin
B. R. Gopalakrishnan - Flute
M. L. Ramalinga Bhagavathar - Harmonium
K. M. Rangachari - Organ
P. N. Govindaswami - Piano
A. N. Sundararajaiyer - Tabela
A. S. Kuppuswamiyer - Jaladarangam
B. Lakshmipathi Naidu - Clarinet

== Reception ==
The film was a success in box-office. It is remembered for "The tuneful music, and the outstanding performance of Bannibai as the cruel mother-in-law".
