= E. R. Sahadevan =

Indian Actor

- Born: Sahadevan
- Occupations: Film actor, Stage actor
- Years active: 1937-1972
- Notable work: 1000 Thalai Vaangi Apoorva Chinthamani; Malaikkallan; Gulebakavali; Mayabazar; Thillana Mohanambal

E. R. Sahadevan was a Tamil veteran villain actor. He acted as the villain along with M. G. Ramachandran, Sivaji Ganesan, Gemini Ganesan, and S. S. Rajendran in the 1940s, 1950s and 1960s. He made his debut film Rajasekaran Emantha Sonagiri, released in 1937.

He acted in the 1965 film Thiruvilayadal.

== Career ==
In his early days he acted in many stage plays, then started to act in feature films. His first film was Rajasekaran. Starting in the 1940s, he acted in villain roles and supporting roles. His notable movies were 1000 Thalai Vaangi Apoorva Chinthamani, Malaikkallan, Gulebakavali, Mayabazar, Kathavarayan, Pudumaipithan, and Thillana Mohanambal.

== Filmography ==
Year	Film	Role	Note
1937	Rajasekaran Emantha Sonagiri		Debut as lead actor
1941	Dayalan		
1943	Devakanya	Suravarman	
1943	Dewan Bahadur		
1944	Prabhavathi	Sunabhan	
1947	1000 Thalai Vaangi Apoorva Chinthamani	Purandharan	
1948	Lakshmi Vijayam	King of Avandhi	
1949	Inbavalli		
1949	Kanniyin Kathali	Kithivarman	
1951	Kalavathi		
1953	Naalvar		
1954	Malaikkallan	Kathavarayan	
1954	Koondukkili	Sokkalingam	
1955	Gulebakavali		
1955	Guna Sundari		
1955	Pennarasi		
1955	Kaveri		
1956	Rambaiyin Kaadhal	Lord Indra	
1956	Naane Raja		
1956	Marumalarchi		
1956	Thaikkupin Tharam	Rathnam Pillai	
1957	Mayabazar	Dushasana	
1957	Allavudeenum Arputha Vilakkum		
1957	Pudumaipithan	Parakraman	
1957	Magathala Nattu Mary		
1957	Makkalai Petra Magarasi	Mayandi	
1957	Neelamalai Thirudan	Neelamalai Thirudan's father	
1957	Chakravarthi Thirumagal		
1958	Bhoologa Rambai		
1958	Nadodi Mannan	the commander-in-chief of Ratnapuri	
1958	Kathavarayan	King Aryan	
1958	Chenchu Lakshmi		
1958	Petra Maganai Vitra Annai	General Vikraman	
1958	Sengottai Singam	Malayandi	
1959	Sumangali		
1959	Thaai Magalukku Kattiya Thaali	Thiruvenkatam	
1960	Chenchi Lakshmi		
1961	Sri Valli	Nambi Raja	
1962	Mahaveera Bheeman	Bhima	
1964	Navarathri		
1965	Veera Abhimanyu		
1966	Mahakavi Kalidas	King	
1966	Saraswati Sabatham	Soldier	
1967	Seetha		
1968	Thirumal Perumai	Chola King	
1968	Thillana Mohanambal	'Minor' Nagalingam	
1970	Nadu Iravil		
1971	Aathi Parasakthi		
1972	Agathiyar		
