= Koondukkili =

1954 film by T. R. Ramanna

- Theatrical release poster
- Directed by: T. R. Ramanna
- Written by: Vindhan
- Produced by: T. R. Ramanna; T. R. Rajakumari
- Starring: M. G. Ramachandran; Sivaji Ganesan; B. S. Saroja; T. D. Kusalakumari
- Cinematography: M. A. Rahman
- Edited by: M. S. Mani
- Music by: K. V. Mahadevan
- Production company: R. R. Pictures
- Release date: 26 August 1954
- Country: India
- Language: Tamil

Koondukkili (transl. Caged parrot) is a 1954 Indian Tamil-language drama film directed and co-produced by T. R. Ramanna. The film stars M. G. Ramachandran, Sivaji Ganesan and B. S. Saroja. It was released on 26 August 1954. Although a commercial failure, it gained historical reputation over time because it was the only film in which Ramachandran and Ganesan acted together.

== Plot ==
Thangaraj and Jeeva are friends. Thangaraj is married to Mangala and they have a son. He goes to jail for a crime committed by Jeeva. Mangala is left with no money or house to live in. Jeeva tries to help Mangala with the sinister motive of getting into a relationship with her. After she repeatedly refuses his attempts to help her, Jeeva starts to sadistically taunt her, but he never wins her. Meanwhile, Sokki is in love with Jeeva. When Jeeva tries to embrace Mangala, he is struck by thunder and loses his eyesight. Thangaraj is released from prison and saves Mangala from Jeeva.

== Cast ==
- M. G. Ramachandran as Thangaraj
- Sivaji Ganesan as Jeevanandham (alias) Jeeva
- B. S. Saroja as Mangala
- T. D. Kusalakumari as Sokki
- Master Mohan as Kannan
- K. Sarangapani as Chinnaiya
- T. P. Muthulakshmi as Chinnaiyee
- Friend Ramasamy as Brother
- V. M. Ezhumalai as Colony Members
- E. R. Sahadevan as Sokkalingam
- G. Sakunthala as Street beggar Madwoman
- K. S. Angamuthu as Thangraj Home Owner
- Yathartham Ponnusamy Pillai as Dhandapani
- K. N. Kamalam as Sundari
- Loose Aarumugam as Jeeva Friend

== Production ==
The film was written by Vindhan and is the only film where Tamil superstars M. G. Ramachandran and Sivaji Ganesan acted together.

== Soundtrack ==
The music was composed by K. V. Mahadevan.

Song	Singers	Lyrics	Length (m:ss)
Aanandhamaai Vaazha Vendume	T. V. Rathnam	A. Maruthakasi	3:06
Yaar Vanthennai Edhirtthaalum	P. A. Periyanayaki	Thanjai N. Ramaiah Dass	3:00
Raatthirikku Boovaavukku Laatteri	T. M. Soundararajan, K. V. Mahadevan, V. N. Sundaram	Thanjai N. Ramaiah Dass	2:46
Paar En Magale Paar Paar	Radha Jayalakshmi	Vindhan	3:31
Solla Vallaayo Kiliye	T. V. Rathnam	Bharathiyar	5:32
Vaanga Ellorume Ondraagave	T. M. Soundararajan, V. N. Sundaram, Radha Jayalakshmi, K. Rani	K. M. Sheriff	3:57
Konjum Kiliyaana Pennai	T. M. Soundararajan	Vindhan	5:21
Kaayaadha Kaanagatthe	T. M. Soundararajan, V. N. Sundaram	Thanjai N. Ramaiah Dass	3:20
Enakku Theriyala Nijama	P. A. Periyanayaki	Vindhan	2:25

== Reception ==
The film was a commercial failure in its original release, but as it remained the only film in which Ramachandran and Ganesan acted together, it gained historical reputation over time.
