= T. R. Raghunath =

Indian film director

- Born: Thimatchipuram Rajagopal Raghunath; 16 July 1912; Thiruvananthapuram, Travancore, British Raj
- Died: 2 January 1990 (aged 77)
- Occupation: Film director
- Spouse: M. S. Saroja
- Children: Kalyani Saichandran; Karthik Raghunath; Jamuna Jaishankar; Rajaram Raghunath; Jeeva Raghunath

Thimatchipuram Rajagopal Raghunath (16 July 1912 – 2 January 1990) was an Indian film director. He was the younger brother of film director Raja Chandrasekhar.

== Career ==
Raghunath started his film career as an assistant director in Gnanasoundari (1935). He then worked as a sound recordist in Dhara Sasangam (1936) for Sreenivasa Cinetone before making his directorial debut the same year with Kizhattu Mappillai. He directed more than 30 films in Tamil. M. G. Ramachandran featured in minor roles in a couple of his films during 1940s. Subsequently, he directed M. G. Ramachandranin Raja Desingu movie, released in 1960, after much delay in production.

Raghunath later went on to become a technical adviser at Karpagam Studios, after which he was appointed the President of the Madras branch of the Films Division of India (FDI).

== Filmography ==
Year	Film	Produced by:
1936	Kizhattu Mappillai	Sreenivasa Cinetone
1939	Jothi	Jothi Pictures
1941	Vedavathi or Seetha Jananam	Shyamala Pictures
1942	Tamizhariyum Perumal	Uma Pictures
1944	Mahamaya	Jupiter Pictures
1944	Prabhavathi	Krishna Pictures
1946	Arthanaari	Kalaivani Films; Madras United Artistes Corporation
1947	Udayanan Vasavadatta	Uma Pictures
1951	Vanasundari	Krishna Pictures
1951	Singari	National Productions
1952	Mappillai	National Productions
1954	Vilayattu Bommai	Sri Sukumaran Productions
1955	Ulagam Palavitham	National Productions
1955	Kanavane Kankanda Deivam	Narayanan Company
1955	Maheswari	Modern Theatres
1956	Marma Veeran	Mehboob Studio
1957	Allavuddin Adbhuta Deepam	Jai Shakti Pictures
1957	Rani Lalithangi	T. N. R. Productions
1957	Yaar Paiyyan	Vijaya Films
1958	Kanniyin Sabatham	Jupiter Pictures
1958	Mangalya Bhagyam	Krishna Pictures
1959	Vannakili	Modern Theatres
1960	Anbukkor Anni	Film Center
1960	Raja Desingu	Krishna Pictures
1961	Marutha Nattu Veeran	Sri Ganesh Prasad Movies
1962	Kavitha	Modern Theatres
1962	Vikramaadhithan	Jaya Bharat Productions
1971	Lora Neeyevide (Malayalam film)	Excel Productions
1971	Thirumagal	Govindarajaa Films
1972	Mappillai Azhaippu	
1974	Angathattu (Malayalam film)	Azeem Company

== Bibliography ==
- Rajadhyaksha, Ashish; Willemen, Paul (1998) [1994]. Encyclopaedia of Indian Cinema (PDF). Oxford University Press. ISBN 0-19-563579-5.
- "Director T. R. Raghunath". 21 November 2014.
