= Karunthel Kannayiram =

- Theatrical release poster
- Directed by: R. Sundaram
- Written by: Ma. Ra. (dialogues)
- Starring: Jaishankar; Lakshmi
- Cinematography: G. R. Nathan
- Edited by: L. Balu
- Music by: Shyam–Philips
- Production company: Modern Theatres
- Release date: 17 May 1972
- Running time: 146 minutes
- Country: India
- Language: Tamil

Karunthel Kannayiram (transl. Kannayiram, the black scorpion) is a 1972 Indian Tamil-language crime thriller film directed by R. Sundaram and produced by Modern Theatres. The film stars Jaishankar and Lakshmi. It was released on 17 May 1972 and failed commercially.

== Cast ==
Male cast

- Jaishankar as Arun and Asok / Karunthel Kannayiram
- Manohar
- V. S. Raghavan
- Thengai Srinivasan
- Moorthy

Female cast

- Lakshmi
- Manorama as a vamp
- A. Sakunthala

== Soundtrack ==
The soundtrack was composed by Shyam–Philips, with lyrics by Kannadasan. The song "Haha! Poonthamalliyile" belongs to Baila, a Sri Lankan music genre.

Track listing
No.	Title	Singer(s)	Length
1.	"Unga Kalyanathil"	P. Susheela
2.	"Parakkum"	P. Susheela and chorus
3.	"Haha! Poonthamalliyile"	S. P. Balasubrahmanyam, Manorama and Sadan
4.	"Parandhu Vaa Vaa"	P. Susheela and chorus
5.	"Panam Venum"	P. Susheela
6.	"Netruvarai"	S. P. Balasubrahmanyam, P. Susheela (humming only)

== Release and reception ==
Karunthel Kannayiram was released on 17 May 1972, and failed commercially.
