= Manonmani =

- Poster
- Directed by: T. R. Sundaram
- Based on: Manonmaneeyam by Sundaram Pillai
- Starring: P. U. Chinnappa, T. R. Rajakumari, Serukalathur Sama
- Edited by: D Durairaj
- Music by: T. A. Kalyanam (Kalyanam Orchestra)
- Production company: Modern Theatres
- Release date: 7 November 1942
- Running time: 175 Minutes
- Language: Tamil

Manonmani is a 1942 Indian Tamil-language film directed by T. R. Sundaram. The film stars P. U. Chinnappa, T. R. Rajakumari, Serukalathur Sama, T. S. Balaiah, T. R. Mahalingam, K. K. Perumal, A. Sakunthala, N. S. Krishnan, T. A. Mathuram, Kali N. Rathnam, L. Narayana Rao, S. S. Kokko, C. T. Rajakantham, P. R. Mangalam, P. G. Venkatesan, T. R. B. Rao, M. E. Madhavan, Buffoon Shanmugham, J. M. G. Sarada and G. Saraswathi. It is based on the 1892 play Manonmaneeyam by Sundaram Pillai. The film ran for more than 25 weeks in theatres.

== Plot ==
King Seevaka of the Pandya Kingdom ruled from its capital, Madurai. However, under the bad influence of his minister, Kutilan (Balasubramaniam), he moved the capital to Tirunelveli, where Kutilan sought to consolidate power and overthrow the king. Rajaguru (Sama) told the king that the new capital is not so strong. He said that he would make the Kingdom good with doing a yagna and want to have a special room for him.

Manonmani, the Pandya princess (Rajakumari), falls in love in her dream with a prince Purushottaman (Chinnappa) who too does likewise with each unaware of the other's identity! But their love grows deeper in their hearts. The Rajaguru (Sama) is keen on bringing the two kingdoms together and builds a ‘secret way' from one kingdom to the other. However, the King (Perumal) is under the influence of the scheming minister Kutilan, (Balasubramaniam, the name was obviously inspired by the celebrated Kautilya, Chanakya.) The minister's son Balaiah has an eye on the princess, and the father and son try to manipulate the king's mind…

After many twists, the lovers meet and the two kingdoms come together and the ‘dream lovers' marry. A tale of kings, princes and princesses, Rajaguru and evil ministers, Manonmani was a box office hit with Rajakumari and Chinnappa stealing the show. Sakunthala (Mrs. Chinnappa in private life) played the princess's companion, while the ‘comedy track' was taken care of by Krishnan-Mathuram supported by Narayana Rao.

== Cast ==
- P. U. Chinnappa as 'Chera King' Puruchothaman
- T. R. Rajakumari as Manonmani
- T. S. Balaiah as Palathevan
- T. R. Mahalingam as Natarajan
- N. S. Krishnan as Pani Pandaram
- T. A. Madhuram as
- N. Kali Rathnam as Suba
- R. Balasubramaniam as Kudilan
- Serukalathur Sama as The Rajaguru
- Kottapuli Jayaraman as The lender
- Pulimootai Ramasamy as Saint
- L. Narayana Rao
- S. S. Kokko (Pasupuleti Srinivasulu Naidu)
- C. T. Rajakantham
- P. R. Mangalam
- P. G. Venkatesan
- T. R. B. Rao
- M. E. Madhavan
- "Buffoon" Shanmugham
- J. M. G. Sarada
- G. Saraswathi

== Soundtrack ==
The music was composed by T. A. Kalyanam assisted by K. V. Mahadevan and the lyrics were penned by Papanasam Rajagopala Iyer

| No | Song | Raagam | Singer |
|---|---|---|---|
| 1 | "Kanden Kanden En Kaadhal Kaniyai Kanden" | | |
| 2 | "Mohana Maamadhanaa" | Punnagavarali | |
| 3 | "Mohanaanga Vadhani" | Kanada, Darbari Kanada | |
| 4 | "Undranuko Inaiyaavaar" | Bhairavi | |
| 5 | "Vaanamudhe, Maan Vizhiye, Unai Kaanbeno" | | |
| 6 | "Ooooonnnu Oru Vaaarthai" | | |
| 7 | "Yaarukku Venduvadhinge" | | |
| 8 | "Koodik Kondaduvom" | | P. G. Venkatesan, P. A. Periyanayaki |

== Reception ==
Kalki in their review appreciated the performances of the cast.
