= Vichitra Vanitha =

- Directed by: Krishnaswami Subrahmanyam
- Screenplay by: Br Lakshmanan
- Based on: She Stoops to Conquer by Oliver Goldsmith
- Produced by: Krishnaswami Subrahmanyam
- Starring: B. S. Saroja; Chitra S. Krishnaswami; Pulimoottai Ramaswami; P. A. Periyanayaki; K. S. Angamuthu
- Cinematography: Prabhakar
- Music by: Br Lakshmanan
- Production company: Madras United Artistes Corporation
- Distributed by: Madras United Artistes Corporation
- Release date: 10 October 1947 (India)
- Running time: 162 mins. (14653 ft.)
- Country: India
- Language: Tamil

Vichitra Vanitha (transl. Queer Woman) is a 1947 Indian Tamil-language film produced and directed by Krishnaswami Subrahmanyam. The film stars B. S. Saroja and S. Krishnaswamy.

== Plot ==
The story explores the fun and misunderstandings between people due to mistaken identities. The main character is a woman attempting to attract the attention of a young rich man who she has fallen in love with.

== Cast ==
The list is compiled from the database of Film News Anandan and from the review article in the Hindu newspaper.

- B. S. Saroja
- Chitra S. Krishnaswami
- P. A. Periyanayaki
- Pulimoottai Ramaswami
- K. S. Angamuthu
- K. Kumaraswami
- K. S. Mani
- K. Lakshmikantham
- A. M. Somasundaram

== Production ==
The film was produced by Krishnaswami Subrahmanyam who also directed it. Part of film was made at Chitrakala Movietone, a studio situated at Thiruparankundram on the outskirts of Madurai. The rest was done at Neptune Studio in Madras. P. A. Periyanayaki, who was a popular singing star of the time, featured in a supportive role.

The story was based on the English play She Stoops to Conquer by Oliver Goldsmith.

== Soundtrack ==
Music was composed by Brother Lakshmanan (who also wrote the screenplay and dialogues). The film had many patriotic songs. P. A. Periyanayaki sang a number of songs.

== Reception ==
The film was a success at the box office. It is remembered well for the comedy and performance by B. S. Saroja and Pulimoottai Ramasami.
