= Rani Lalithangi =

1957 Indian film

- Theatrical release poster
- Directed by: T. R. Raghunath
- Written by: Thanjai N. Ramaiah Dass
- Produced by: Tiruchi R. Kalyanaraman
- Starring: Sivaji Ganesan; P. Bhanumathi
- Cinematography: P. L. Rai
- Edited by: R. Rajagopal
- Music by: G. Ramanathan
- Production company: T. N. R. Productions
- Release date: 21 September 1957
- Running time: 153 minutes
- Country: India
- Language: Tamil

Rani Lalithangi (transl. Queen Lalithangi) is a 1957 Indian Tamil-language historical drama film directed by T. R. Raghunath, starring Sivaji Ganesan and P. Bhanumathi. The film, a remake of the 1935 film Lalithangi, was released on 21 September 1957.

== Cast ==
- Sivaji Ganesan as Azhagapuri Prince Azhagesan
- P. Bhanumathi as Lalithangi
- Rajasulochana as Maya
- P. S. Veerappa as King Gantheeban
- K. A. Thangavelu
- Serukalathur Sama
- K. Sarangapani
- R. Balasubramaniam as Emperor Ampalavanan
- S. D. Subbulakshmi as Empress Angaiyarkanni
- T. P. Muthulakshmi
- M. Saroja
- Devika as Lalithangi's friend

== Production ==
Rani Lalithangi is a remake of the 1935 film Lalithangi. The lead role was initially offered to M. G. Ramachandran, but he declined following creative differences; Sivaji Ganesan was later cast.

== Soundtrack ==
The music was composed by G. Ramanathan and lyrics written by Thanjai N. Ramaiah Dass.

| Song | Singers | Length |
|---|---|---|
| "Aandavane Illaiye" | T. M. Soundararajan | 03:12 |
| "Inbam Perinbam" | P. Bhanumathi | 05:39 |
| "Sri Saraswathi Dhevimatha" | D. B. Ramachandra & P. Leela | 03:03 |
| "Ettadi Koyilile" | T. M. Soundararajan | 02:47 |
| "Bulbul Jodi" | S. C. Krishnan & T. V. Rathnam | 04:09 |
| "Madhunilai Maaraadha" | P. Bhanumathi | |
| "Idhu Poruththamaana" | Jikki | 03:04 |
| "Kaadhalukku Kannillai" | C. S. Jayaraman | 03:28 |
| "Ennai Ariyaamal Thulludhadi" | P. Bhanumathi | 03:33 |
| "Aadunga Paadunga Odureenga" | P. Leela & A. G. Rathnamala | 02:27 |
| "Natvaangam" | Seerkazhi Govindarajan | 03:31 |
| "Bajanaikku" | A. G. Rathnamala & V. T. Rajagopalan | 03:33 |
| "Kal Endraalum Kanavanaa" | P. Leela | 03:01 |
| "Kannaale Mannaadhi Mannarum" | M. L. Vasanthakumari | |

== Release ==
Rani Lalithangi was released on 21 September 1957, and did not do well commercially.
