= Ekambavanan =

1947 Tamil-language film

- Directed by: B. N. Rao (Balkrishna Narayan Rao); T. V. Krishnaswami
- Screenplay by: Krishna Iyengar
- Starring: Kothamangalam Seenu; P. A. Periyanayaki; K. Sarangapani; C. T. Rajakantham
- Music by: G. Ramanathan
- Production company: Saravanabhava Pictures
- Release date: 21 August 1947 (India)
- Running time: 135 mins. (12200 ft.)
- Country: India
- Language: Tamil

Ekambavanan is a 1947 Indian, Tamil-language film directed by B. N. Rao and T. V. Krishnaswami. The film featured Kothamangalam Seenu and P. A. Periyanayaki in the lead roles.

== Cast ==
- Kothamangalam Seenu
- K. Sarangapani
- S. V. Subbaiah
- Nagarcoil K. Mahadevan
- P. A. Periyanayaki
- C. T. Rajakantham
- Baby Kamala

== Production ==
This was the first film where P. A. Periyanayaki was cast as a heroine.

== Soundtrack ==
Music was composed by G. Ramanathan while the lyrics were written by Papanasam Sivan and T. K. Sundara Vathiyar. Kothamangalam Seenu and P. A. Periyanayagi sang the songs.
