= Sabapathy =

1941 film by A. V. Meiyappan and A. T. Krishnaswamy

- Theatrical release poster
- Directed by: A. V. Meiyappan; A. T. Krishnaswamy
- Written by: P. Sambandha Mudaliar
- Based on: Sabapathy by P. Sambandha Mudaliar
- Produced by: A. V. Meiyappan
- Starring: T. R. Ramachandran; Kali N. Rathnam; R. Padma; C. T. Rajakantham
- Cinematography: P. V. Krishna Iyer
- Edited by: M. V. Raman
- Music by: Saraswathi Stores Orchestra
- Production company: Pragati Pictures Ltd
- Distributed by: South Indian Pictures
- Release date: 14 December 1941
- Country: India
- Language: Tamil
- Budget: ₹40,000

Sabapathy is a 1941 Indian Tamil-language comedy film directed by A. V. Meiyappan and A. T. Krishnaswamy, and produced by Meiyappan. An adaptation of Pammal Sambandha Mudaliar's farce play of the same name, the film stars T. R. Ramachandran, Kali N. Rathnam, C. T. Rajakantham and K. Sarangapani. It focuses on the antics of two dim-witted men named Sabapathy: a wealthy man and his servant. The film was released on 14 December 1941 and became a commercial success.

== Plot ==
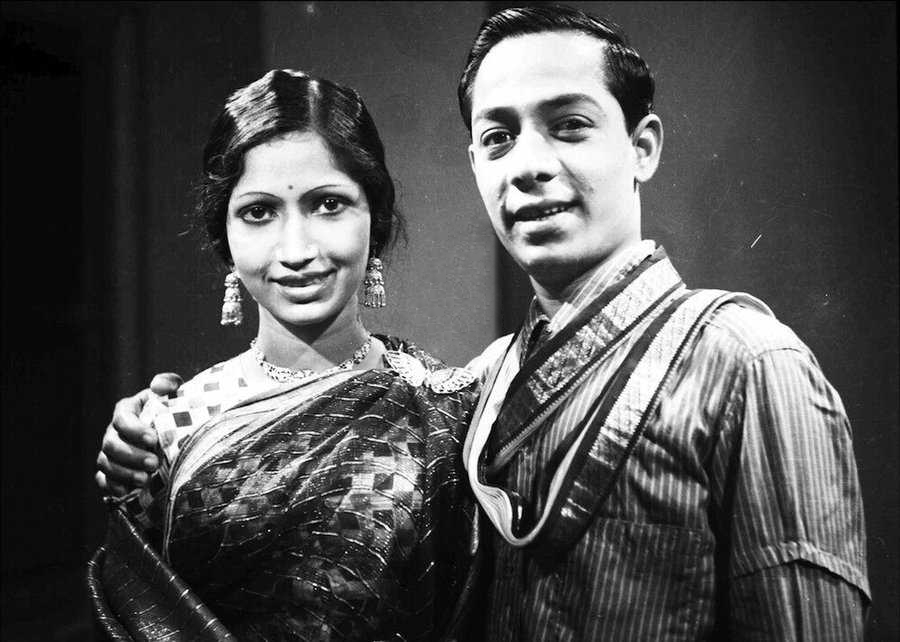
R. Padma and T. R. Ramachandran

Sabapathy Mudaliar is the son of a rich socialite and politician, Rao Sahib Manikka Mudaliar, and a pet of his mother Thiripurammal. A laid-back man with little intelligence, he is appearing for his Matriculation examination. His servant, also named Sabapathy, is an innocent and even greater fool. Sabapathy Mudaliar does not focus on his studies; he constantly engages in teasing his teacher Chinnasami Mudaliar, and eventually fails in the Matriculation examination.

Sabapathy Mudaliar's parents arrange his marriage with Sivakamu, an educated and intelligent woman, hoping this will make him responsible. After marriage, Sabapathy Mudaliar shifts to Sivakamu's house with his servant. His parents' plan fails as Sabapathy Mudaliar, instead of focusing on his studies, tries to have a good time with his wife at her house.

The servant Sabapathy falls in love with Sivakamu's servant Kundumuthu and eventually marries her. Manicka Mudaliar brings his son back home and advises Sivakamu to help him focus on studies so that he completes his Matriculation and attends college along with her. Sivakamu, who took a break from studies for marriage, motivates him to study so that both can attend college together.

Though Sabapathy Mudaliar has several distractions and no focus, Sivakamu teaches him the subjects and finally he passes his examination. His father, who had given up on his son, is finally happy to see his son passing the examination. The servant Sabapathy also becomes a knowledgeable person thanks to Kundumuthu. Both men declare that wife is the best companion in life.

== Cast ==
Male cast

- T. R. Ramachandran as Sabapathy Mudaliyar
- Kali N. Rathnam as Sabapathy
- K. Sarangapani as Tamil Teacher Chinnasamy Mudaliyar
- S. Kuppusamy Iyengar as Rao Sahib Manickam Mudaliyar
- N. S. Kannan as Kumaraguru, Dr. Kuppusamy
- Konjithapatham Pillai as Chidambarathadigal
- K. V. Sornappa as Krishnasamy
- K. Hirannaiah as Dhathiraman
- K. Devanarayanan as Murugesan
- K. P. Rathnapathar as Dinakarasamy Naidu
- K. S. Jagadesa Iyer as Hotel Viswanatha Iyer

Female cast

- R. Padma as Sivakamu
- C. T. Rajakantham as Kundumuthu
- P. R. Mangalam as Thiripurammal
- V. M. Pankajam as Kanni Ammal
- C. K. Kamalam as Deivayanai Ammal

Music concert

- P. A. Periyanayaki – Vocals
- C. V. Dhanalakshmi – Fiddle
- V. Neelamburi – Mridangam

== Production ==
Sabapathy was a farce play written by Pammal Sambandha Mudaliar in 1906, his first one. It revolved around a young, unintelligent zamindar and his foolish servant both sharing the name Sabapathy. The inspiration for the servant Sabapathy came from Mudaliar observing the man Fridays of some of his friends. He considered Narasimhan, the personal assistant of his lawyer friend V. V. Srinivasa Iyengar, as having served as the base to building the character, and the title character of the Samuel Lover novel Handy Andy as an influence. The story was written in eight parts, each of which was capable of being staged as a separate play. Mudaliar himself played the zamindar, while many of his troupe members played the servant. The play attained immense popularity and was staged many times.

Director A. T. Krishnaswamy suggested to producer A. V. Meiyappan, with whom he was working in Pragathi Pictures, to make a film based on Mudaliar's play, and Meiyappan agreed. T. R. Ramachandran and Kali N. Rathnam were chosen to play the roles of the zamindar and the servant respectively. Having finalised Ramachandran to play the zamindar, Meiyappan brought him to Mudaliar for his approval, which was given after a brief test of his capability to do justice to the role. Ramachandran was paid ₹35 per month for acting in the film. R. Padma, a Lux model, was paired alongside Ramachandran and C. T. Rajakantham was paired opposite Rathnam. The budget of the film was ₹40,000 (worth ₹5 crore in 2021 prices).

== Release and reception ==
Sabapathy was released on 14 December 1941, and distributed by South Indian Pictures. The film was a major box office success. The jokes about Tamil teachers and the name confusion between the hero and the simpleton were well received by the audience. The film bought acclaim to the director A. T. Krishnaswamy and the hero T. R. Ramachandran. The comedic duo of Kali N. Rathnam and C. T. Rajakantham also became famous rivalling the fame of N. S. Krishnan-T. A. Mathuram. As of 2020, it is still popular and is regularly shown in Tamil television channels.
