= Br Lakshmanan =

- Occupation: Music director
- Years active: 1952-1966

Br Lakshmanan was an Indian music director of Tamil and Malayalam movies during the 1950s and 1960s.

Lakshmanan started his career with Aathmasakhi in 1952. He provided music for around 250 Malayalam movie songs. Lakshmanan's songs were also used in the films Ponkathir, Baalyasakhi and Harishchandra. Most of his songs were written by Thirunainar Kurichi Madhavan Nair and sung by Kamukara Purushothaman. The trio created numerous popular songs in the 1950s and early 60s, mostly for the films produced by Merryland Studios.

== Filmography ==
Year	Film	Language	Director	Banner	Co-Music Directors
1946	Vikatayogi	Tamil	K. Subramanyam	Madras United Artistes Corporation	Modhi Babu & Radha Krishnan
1947	Vichitra Vanitha	Tamil	K. Subramanyam	Madras United Artistes Corporation	
1949	Geetha Gandhi	Tamil	K. Subramanyam	Madras United Artistes Corporation	C. N. Pandurangan
1952	Aathmasakhi	Malayalam	G. R. Rao	Neela Productions	
1952	Priyasakhi	Tamil	G. R. Rao	Neela Productions	
1953	Ponkathir	Malayalam	E. R. Cooper	Neela Productions	
1953	Irulukku Pin	Tamil	E. R. Cooper	Neela Productions	
1954	Baalyasakhi	Malayalam	Antony Mitradas	Neela Productions	
1954	Avakasi	Malayalam	Antony Mitradas	Neela Productions	
1954	Avan Yaar	Tamil	Antony Mitradas	Neela Productions	
1955	Aniyathi	Malayalam	M. Krishnan Nair	Neela Productions	
1955	Harishchandra	Malayalam	Antony Mitradas	Neela Productions	
1955	Kalam Marunnu	Malayalam	R. Velappan Nair	Kailas Pictures	G. Devarajan
1955	C.I.D.	Malayalam	M. Krishnan Nair	Neela Productions	
1955	C.I.D.	Tamil	M. Krishnan Nair	Neela Productions	
1956	Manthravadi	Malayalam	P. Subramaniam	Neela Productions	
1956	Mandhiravadhi	Tamil	P. Subramaniam	Neela Productions	
1957	Padatha Painkili	Malayalam	P. Subramaniam	Neela Productions	
1957	Jailppulli	Malayalam	P. Subramaniam	Neela Productions	
1958	Mariakutty	Malayalam	P. Subramaniam	Neela Productions	
1959	Aana Valarthiya Vanampadi	Malayalam	P. Subramaniam	Neela Productions	
1959	Yaanai Valartha Vaanambadi	Tamil	P. Subramaniam	Neela Productions	
1960	Petraval Kanda Peruvazhvu	Tamil	P. Subramaniam	Neela Productions	
1960	Poothali	Malayalam	P. Subramaniam	Neela Productions	
1961	Bhakta Kuchela	Malayalam	P. Subramaniam	Neela Productions	
1961	Christmas Rathri	Malayalam	P. Subramaniam	Neela Productions	
1961	Yar Manamagan?	Tamil	P. Subramaniam	Neela Productions	
1962	Sreerama Pattabhishekam	Malayalam	G. K. Ramu	Neela Productions	
1963	Snapaka Yohannan	Malayalam	P. Subramaniam	Neela Productions	
1963	Kaattumaina	Malayalam	M. Krishnan Nair	Neela Productions	
1963	Kaattumaina	Tamil	M. Krishnan Nair	Neela Productions	
1964	Atom Bomb	Malayalam	P. Subramaniam	Neela Productions	
1966	Priyathama	Malayalam	P. Subramaniam	Neela Productions	
