= Nanban (1954 film) =

- Directed by: P. S. Srinivasa Rao
- Written by: V. N. Sambantham (dialogues)
- Story by: Ma. Lakshmanan
- Produced by: M. D. Viswanathan
- Starring: R. S. Manohar; P. K. Saraswathi; T. S. Balaiah; V. Nagayya
- Music by: G. Ramanathan
- Production company: M. D. V. Productions
- Release date: 25 October 1954
- Running time: 159 minutes
- Country: India
- Language: Tamil

Nanban (transl. Friend) is a 1954 Indian Tamil-language film directed by P. S. Srinivasa Rao. The film stars R. S. Manohar and P. K. Saraswathi. It was released on 25 October 1954.

== Cast ==
List adapted from the database of Film News Anandan and from Thiraikalanjiyam.

Male cast

- R. S. Manohar
- T. S. Balaiah
- V. Nagayya
- K. A. Thangavelu

Female cast

- P. K. Saraswathi
- Vidhyavathi
- T. D. Kusalakumari

== Production ==
The film was produced by M. D. Viswanathan and directed by P. S. Srinivasa Rao under the banner M. D. V. Productions. M. Lakshmanan wrote the story while V. N. Sambantham penned the dialogues.

== Soundtrack ==
Music was composed by G. Ramanathan while the lyrics were penned by Thanjai N. Ramaiah Dass.

Song	Singer
"Jayamarul Sadhaa Kajavaradha"	P. Leela
"Gathi Yaarum Illaiye"	P. A. Periyanayaki
"Amaidhi Nilava Vazhiyum"	Jikki
"Paavi Naan Kodum Paavi"	Ghantasala
"Athai Magan Thaanunga"	Thiruchi Loganathan & Jikki
"Kan Sollum Kaadhal"	Thiruchi Loganathan & P. Leela
"Kaadhal Rahasiyame"	Thiruchi Loganathan & Jikki
"En Munnae Vandhu Neeye"	Jikki
"Needhi Devaa Niyaayamaa"	Ghantasala
