= K. Sarangapani =

Indian actor

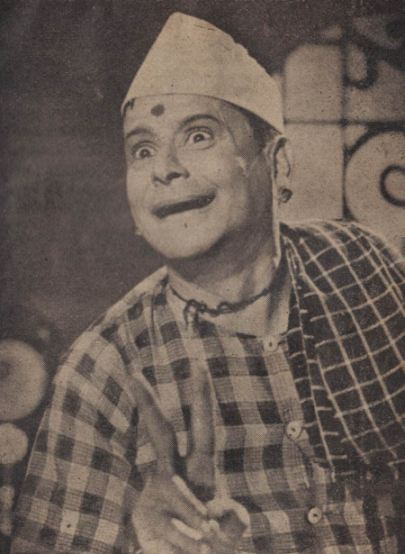
- K. Sarangapani in the 1951 film Mohana Sundaram
- Born: Kumbakonam Sarangapani; 1904; Kumbakonam, British India
- Died: 1984; Madras, India
- Occupation: Actor
- Years active: 1935–1968
- Spouse: Thaiyalnayaki

Kumbakonam Sarangapani (1904-1984) was an Indian actor who worked mainly in Tamil cinema. Though primarily a comedian, he occasionally played roles of hero and villain.

== Family ==
Sarangapani was born in 1904 in Kumbakonam, Tanjore district. His parents were Shivakolunthu and Jagadambal. Sarangapani was the youngest of his three brothers Periya Rajanna (Artist), Thambussamy (Mrudangam Vidwaan), Chinna Rajanna (Nadaswara Vidwaan) and his Sister Ambaal Ammal.

Sarangapani was married to Thayalnayaki. He had three sons and a daughter. As a follower of the freedom movement, he named his children as Gandhi Padamanbhan, Vijayalakshmi Pandit, Bhaskara Patel and Subash Chandra Bose.

== Drama ==
Belonging to a family involved in music performance, his love towards arts was in his genes. At the age of seven, Sarangapani had wandered behind a drama advertising bullock cart and joined Jagannatha Iyer Company. It was here he learned to sing, dance and act. During his early days, he mostly performed "Stree part" – a woman role. Later, he started acting in comedy and lead roles in various dramas.

He moved from Jagannatha Iyer Company and Joined Nawab Rajamanikyam Pillai Company. This company traveled the length and breadth of the state and also to Sri Lanka to perform various dramas.

Sarangapani got his break in movies while performing for Devi Bala Vinoda Sangeeta Sabha in Coimbatore. Though he became busy in movies, he never stopped performing in dramas.

== Hero and Villain ==
Though Sarangapani has acted as a comedian in most of the films, he was the main star in "Rambhaiyin Kaadal". In Andhaman Kaidi, Sarangapani deftly played a villain role as well, in movies such as Andhaman Kaithi (1952).

== Awards ==
- Kalaimamani Award - 1964.
- "Raja Sando" Award for lifetime contribution to films - 1982

== Relationship with Anna ==
Sarangapani, a Congress party member, was known for maintaining connections with people from different political parties.

When Arignar Anna was diagnosed with cancer and was admitted in Adyar, Sarangapani was a daily visitor. He visited a temple to perform pooja in the name of Anna and would bring kumkum as prasadam and apply it to his forehead. Anna, an atheist, would not remove the kumkum from his forehead, as a mark of respect to his friendship.

== Filmography ==
Year	Film
1935	Bhakta Ramadas
1938	Thukkaram
1939	Shantha Sakkubai
1939	Rambhaiyin Kaadal
1941	Sabapathy
1941	Venuganam
1941	Savitri
1942	En Manaivi
1942	Panchamritam
1943	Kaaraikkaal Ammaiyaar or Moondru Thengaai
1945	Paramjyoti
1946	Lavangi
1947	Nam Iruvar
1947	Udayaanan Vaasavadatta
1947	Ekambavanan
1948	Bhakta Jana
1948	Vedhala Ulagam
1949	Vazhkai
1949	Kanniyin Kaadhali
1951	Mohana Sundaram
1951	Raajaambaal
1952	Agastyar
1952	Andhaman Kaidhi
1953	Manampole Mangalyam
1954	Koondukkili
1954	Penn
1954	Ponvayal
1954	Karkottai
1955	Mangaiyar Thilakam
1955	Kalvanin Kadhali
1955	Missiyamma
1955	Menaka
1956	Alibabavum 40 Thirudargalum
1956	Kokilavani
1956	Mathar Kula Manickam
1956	Naan Petra Selvam
1956	Raja Rani
1956	Sadhaaram
1957	Baagyavathi
1957	Makkalai Petra Magarasi
1957	Rani Lalithangi
1957	Thangamalai Ragasiyam
1957	Yaar Paiyan
1958	Kadan Vaangi Kalyanam
1958	Kutumba Gauravam
1958	Nalla Idatu Sambandham
1960	Adutha Veettu Penn
1960	Paavai Vilakku
1960	Kuzhandhaigal Kanda Kudiyarasu
1961	Pangaaligal
1962	Manithan Maravillai
1962	Sumaithaangi
1963	Arivaali
1963	Kulamagal Raadhai
1963	Naan Vanangum Dheivam
1964	Karuppu Panam
1964	Navarathri
1965	Thiruvilaiyadal
1966	Saraswati Sabatham
1966	Marakka Mudiyumaa?
1966	Chinnanchiru Ulagam
1968	Thillana Mohanambal
