= Rajayogam =

- Directed by: Hariharan
- Written by: S. L. Puram Sadanandan
- Screenplay by: S. L. Puram Sadanandan
- Starring: Prem Nazir; Jayabharathi; Adoor Bhasi; Muthukulam Raghavan Pillai
- Cinematography: T. N. Krishnankutty Nair
- Edited by: V. P. Krishnan
- Music by: M. S. Viswanathan
- Release date: 24 December 1976
- Country: India
- Language: Malayalam

Rajayogam is a 1976 Indian Malayalam-language film directed by Hariharan. The film stars Prem Nazir, Jayabharathi, Adoor Bhasi and Muthukulam Raghavan Pillai in the lead roles. The film has musical score by M. S. Viswanathan.

== Cast ==
- Prem Nazir
- Jayabharathi
- Adoor Bhasi
- Muthukulam Raghavan Pillai
- Bahadoor
- Junior Sheela
- K. P. Ummer
- Meena
- Nellikode Bhaskaran
- Vidhubala

== Soundtrack ==
The music was composed by M. S. Viswanathan and the lyrics were written by Mankombu Gopalakrishnan.

No.	Song	Singers	Lyrics	Length (m:ss)
1	"Akkarappacha Thedi"	K. J. Yesudas	Mankombu Gopalakrishnan	
2	"Ezhunilaappanthalitta"	K. J. Yesudas	Mankombu Gopalakrishnan	
3	"Muthukkudakkeezhil"	P. Susheela	Mankombu Gopalakrishnan	
4	"Rathnaakarathinte Madiyilninnum"	K. J. Yesudas	Mankombu Gopalakrishnan	
