= Kothamangalam Seenu =

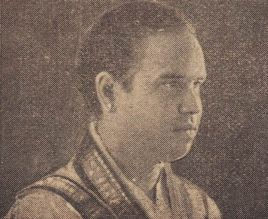
- Born: V. S. Srinivasan; 17 February 1910; Vathirairuppu, Virudhunagar district, Tamil Nadu
- Died: 30 August 2001 (aged 91)
- Occupations: Stage, Film Actor, Carnatic Musician
- Spouse: Anandavalli
- Children: 5 sons, 4 daughters
- Parent(s): Subramanya Iyer, Narayani Ammal

Kothamangalam Seenu (17 February 1910 - 30 August 2001) was a Tamil stage and film actor and Carnatic music singer.

== Early life ==
Seenu was born as V. S. Srinivasan in Vathirairuppu (Anglicised as ‘Watrap'), a village in Virudhunagar district, Tamil Nadu. His parents were Subramaniya Iyer and Narayani Ammal. Not much is known about his early life at his birthplace except that he was well trained in Carnatic music. He went to Kothamangalam, a village near Chettinad in search of employment.

== Career ==
He started his career as a singer and recorded some gramophone records. He gave concerts and also trained students in Carnatic music. Later he joined with Kothamangalam Subbu and began acting in dramas with him.

== Film career ==
His melodious voice and expertise in Carnatic music attracted film producers. Soon, he began to act in films. The first film that he acted in was Sarangadhara (1937), where he played the main character During the early years of Tamil Cinema, music and songs dominated the films. In some cases there were as many as 50, 60 songs in one film. Therefore, there was much scope for singers to act in films and Seenu had good opportunities. However, there were already two big 'guns' who mesmerized people with their golden voice and acting skill at this time. M. K. Thyagaraja Bhagavathar and P. U. Chinnappa were considered 'superstars' and held by the people in high esteem. But Kothamangalam Seenu established a place for himself as a singer actor. After Sarangadhara, he acted in Pattinathar and Vipra Narayana. His songs in Shantha Sakkubai, released in 1939, became very popular. He delivered a musical discourse (கதா காலட்சேபம்) that was a hit. He acted in the main role as Thirumangai Alvar in the film with the same name and was released in 1940. His songs in this film were popular. He acted in several films during the 1940s. His last film 'Thulasi Jalandar' was released in 1947. Thereafter, though he lived for more 50 years, he did not act in any films.

But he was performing Carnatic music concerts on Radio.

== Filmography ==
The following list of films is based on information in Tamil Movie Database.

Year	Film
1935	Sarangadhara
1935	Pattinathar
1938	Vipra Narayana
1940	Thirumangai Azhwar
1940	Manimegalai
1941	Surya Puthri
1941	Kacha Devayani
1942	Bhaktha Naradar
1942	Chogamelar
1942	Krishna Pidaran
1944	Dasi Aparanji
1946	Sakata Yogam
1947	Ponnaruvi
1947	Ekambavanan
1947	Mahatma Udhangar
1947	Thulasi Jalandar
