= R. Balasubramaniam =

Indian actor

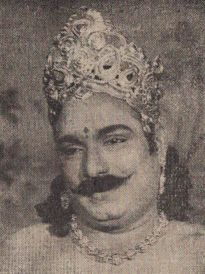
R. Balasubramaniam in Vedhala Ulagam (1948)

R. Balasubramaniyam was an Indian actor whose career spanned from the late 1930s through the late 1950s. He was well known for his role in mythological films and later switched to character roles.

== Filmography ==
Year	Film
1938	Thukkaram
1939	Rambaiyin Kaadhal
1939	Prahalada
1942	Tamizhariyum Perumal
1942	Manonmani
1942	Prabhavathi
1943	Kubera Kuchela
1944	Mahamaya
1944	Harishchandra
1947	Aayiram Thalai Vaangiya Apoorva Chinthamani
1947	Thulasi Jalandhar
1948	Mohini
1948	Thirumazhisai Aazhwar
1948	Vedhala Ulagam
1949	Laila Majnu
1950	Krishna Vijayam
1950	Paarijaatham
1950	Ponmudi
1950	Vijayakumari
1951	Vanasundari
1952	Chinna Durai
1952	Mappillai
1953	Naalvar
1954	Sorgavasal
1955	Kaveri
1955	Gomathiyin Kadhalan
1956	Madhurai Veeran
1957	Karpukkarasi
1957	Mayabazar
1957	Pudhumai Pithan
1957	Raja Rajan
1957	Rani Lalithangi
1957	Chakravarthi Thirumagal
1959	Amudhavalli
1959	Thanga Padhumai
1959	Thaai Magalukku Kattiya Thaali
1964	Karnan
1964	Kai Kodutha Deivam
1971	Aathi Parasakthi
