= C. T. Rajakantham =

Tamil actress

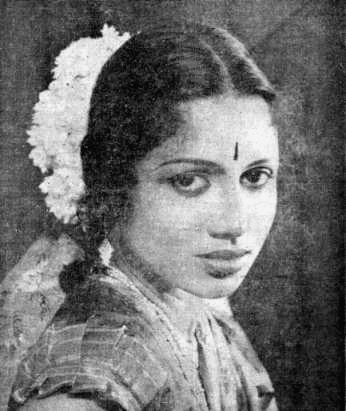
- C. T. Rajakantham in early 1950s
- Born: Rajakantham c. 1917
- Died: 2002 (aged 86); Chennai, India
- Occupations: stage and film actor, singer
- Years active: 1929–1998
- Spouse: Kali N. Rathnam

C. T. Rajakantham (1917–2002) was a Tamil stage and film actress. She was the mother-in-law of playback singer Tiruchi Loganathan and grandmother of playback singers and popular music show judges T. L. Maharajan and Deepan Chakkravarthy

== Early life ==
Rajakantham was born in Coimbatore in about 1917. Once while staging a play in the city, the members of a drama troupe headed by S. R. Janaki stayed at a house owned by Rajakantham's father. Impressed by her acting skills, Janaki inducted Rajakantham in her troupe. Starting with minor roles, Rajakantham later formed a successful comedy duo with veteran comedian Kali N. Rathnam. Rajakantham made her debut in the 1941 movie Sabapathy alongside Rathnam.

== Filmography ==
Year	Film	Language	Notes
1939	Maanikkavasagar	Tamil	Debut
1940	Sathyavaani	Tamil	Comedian role
1941	Sabapathy	Tamil	Gundu muthu
1942	Manonmani	Tamil	
1945	Burma Rani	Tamil	
1946	Sri Murugan	Tamil	
1946	Valmiki	Tamil	
1947	Ekambavanan	Tamil	
1948	Vedhala Ulagam	Tamil	Gomathi Devi
1949	Krishna Bhakthi	Tamil	Ragamanjari
1950	Ponmudi	Tamil	
1954	Mangalyam	Tamil	
1955	Pennarasi	Tamil	
1957	Mudhalali	Tamil	Karpagam
1958	Neelavukku Nerainja Manasu	Tamil	
1959	Kan Thirandhadhu	Tamil	
1959	Bhagapirivinai	Tamil	
1961	Kumara Raja	Tamil	
1961	Palum Pazhamum	Tamil	
1964	Navarathiri	Tamil	
1966	Madras to Pondicherry	Tamil	
1979	Uthiripookkal	Tamil	
1990	Nilapenne	Tamil	

== Television ==
- Marmadesam Vidathu Karuppu as Pechi, 1998 - 1999.
