= T. R. Sundaram =

Indian actor and director (1907–1963)

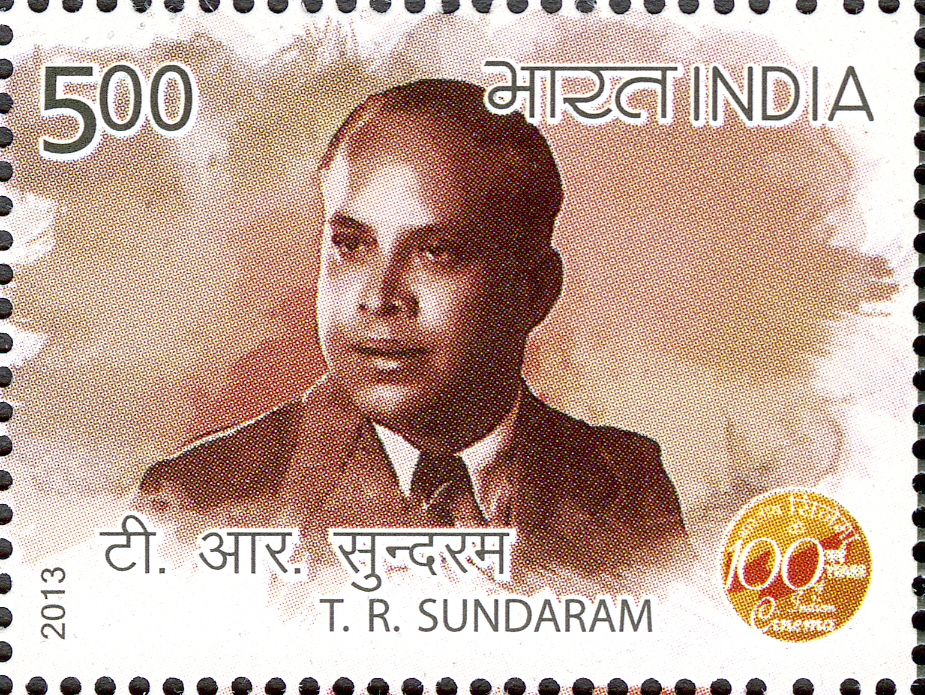
- 2013 stamp of India
- Born: Tiruchengodu Ramalingam Mudaliar Sundaram; 16 July 1907; Tiruchengode, Salem district, Madras Presidency, British India (now in Namakkal district, Tamil Nadu, India)
- Died: 30 August 1963 (aged 56)
- Occupations: Actor, director, producer, textile merchant

Tiruchengodu Ramalingam Sundaram Mudaliar (16 July 1907 – 30 August 1963) was an Indian actor, director, and producer. He was the founder of the Salem-based film production company Modern Theatres.

== Early life ==
Sundaram was born in 1907 into the Sengunthar Kaikola Mudaliar community in Tiruchengode (in present-day Namakkal district, Tamil Nadu) to a wealthy textile merchant V.V.C. Ramalingam Mudaliar.

He received his education in India and in Leeds, England, where he graduated in textile engineering. On returning to India, he managed his family business. After the production of the first Tamil talkie Kalidas in 1931, the film industry emerged as a profitable means of investment. Sundaram set up Angel Pictures in Salem and produced movies along with S. S. Velayutham. He was the brother of famous textile merchant V. V. C. R. Murugesa Mudaliar.

== Film career ==
Sundaram split with Velayutham after a few years and set up his own production company The Modern Theatres Ltd. The first film produced under the banner of Modern Theatres was Sathi Ahalya in 1937. The next year, Sundaram produced the Malayalam film Balan (1938). His 1944 film Arundathi was a commercial success and completed 100 days at the theatres. Sundaram was instrumental in giving M. G. Ramachandran his first major solo box office hit in Manthiri Kumari. They followed it up with Sarvadhikari.

Sundaram served as the president of the South Indian Film Chamber of Commerce (SIFCC) at Madras (Now Chennai).

== Filmography ==
- Sathi Ahalya (1937)
- Balan (1938)
- Arundathi (1944)
- Sulochana (1947)
- Manthiri Kumari (1950)
- Sarvadhikari (1951)

== Awards ==
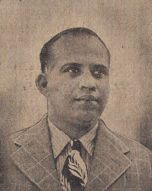
Sundaram in 1938

National Film Awards

- 1961: Certificate of Merit for Second Best Feature Film in Malayalam – Kandam Becha Kottu
