= Modern Theatres =

Indian film studio

Modern Theaters Ltd
- Type: Limited
- Industry: Motion pictures
- Founded: 1935
- Founder: T. R. Sundaram Mudaliar
- Defunct: 2001
- Fate: Liquidated
- Headquarters: Yercaud Road, Salem - 636 008, Tamil Nadu, India
- Area served: Tamil Nadu; Kerala; Andhra Pradesh
- Key people: T. R. Sundaram Mudaliar

Modern Theaters Ltd was an Indian film studio in Salem, Tamil Nadu started by T. R. Sundaram Mudaliar in 1935. The studio produced more than 150 films until 2001 in Tamil, Telugu, Kannada, Malayalam, Hindi, Sinhalese and even English of which Tamil were the majority.

== History ==
In the early 1930s, T. R. Sundaram entered the world of Tamil cinema as a partner of a Salem-based film company, Angel Films. He was involved in productions such as Draupadi Vastrapaharanam (1934), Dhruva (1935) and Nalla Thangal (1935). Then he decided to start his own company, Modern Theatres Limited. He realized that to make film making a business, it had to be organized and managed like a business enterprise. He also planned a schedule of producing films on a tight budget (two or three a year), so that the market and consumers were regularly and continually supplied with his products.

The maiden production of Modern Theatres, directed by Sundaram, was Sathi Ahalya, a mythological plot was released in 1937. The following year he produced the first Malayalam talkie Balan. Sundaram promoted Modern Theatres as a joint stock company and built a studio on a vast stretch of land on the outskirts of Salem town. The hundred odd films that came from his studio covered a wide spectrum of themes — mythology, comedy and original screenplays to adaptation of classic works of literature and murder mysteries. It is, however, the James Bond style of films starring Jaishankar that are almost synonymous with the banner.

Following the Hollywood studio system, T. R. Sundaram paid his writers, technicians and actors generously and promptly, a rarity in the film circle.

== Notable contributions ==
- First time in the world, T. R. Sundaram, the Salem-based Indian movie mogul. It was he who introduced the novel idea of seeking public opinion on the choice of the female and male leads. He advertised in the press, asking moviegoers to suggest the names of artists for the lead roles, and the almost unanimous choice was the 'Dream Girl of Tamil Cinema' Rajakumari as Manonmani and the multi-talented star Chinnappa as the prince-hero. It is perhaps the only incident of its kind in the history of world cinema and certainly in Indian cinema read this article in The Hindu newspaper.
- Produced the first Malayalam talkie Balan in 1938
- First Double role in Tamil Films introduced in Uthama Puthiran starring P. U. Chinnappa in the year 1940.
- The first most expensive film to be produced was Manonmani in 1942, starring P. U. Chinnappa and T. R. Rajakumari.
- First Tamil Color film (Geva Color) was Alibabavum Narpadhu Thirudargalum-1956
- First Malayalam Talkie film called Balan directed by Notani was produced in 1938
- First Malayalam Color film was Kandam Becha Kottu in 1961
- First English film in Tamil Nadu: Modern Theatres teamed up with an American Film company to produce the first English movie in 1952- The Jungle
- First film in which Manorama starred as a heroine is Konjum Kumari in 1963. This is the 97th film for T. R. Sundaram
- First film to have 3 separate stories within a movie was Sow Sow. The 3 stories are Kaligala Mainar, School Drama and Soorapuli.
- When Zoom lens was not invented such an effect was pioneered in Ponmudi (1950 film) for which the French Government awarded the cameraman.
- Has a unique record of having five former Chief Ministers of India on its payroll.
- Frequently used foreigners like Ellis R. Dungan, Manik Lal Tandon, Bomman D. Irani to bring up the quality factor of his films.
- The last film shot at Modern Theatres, Salem was Muthu Engal Sothu (1983)

== Present status ==
The nine-acre landmark on Yercaud road has been transferred to a private construction firm for residential development. To honor the site's history, the developers opted to preserve and relocate the stone archway bearing the historic name " Modern Theatres Limited." The arch will be re-erected a few meters away within a new development named "Sundar Garden, "positioned according to Vastu shastra principles. Other dilapidated structures on the property, including former studio houses and sheds that appeared in numerous films, are being demolished, leaving the stone arch as the sole remaining structure of the original studio complex.

T.R. Sundaram's grandson Suman Sundaram who is settled in Australia is currently looking to enter into the film making and follow his grandfather's route in making successful new technology advancement in the Tamil film industry.

== Gallery ==
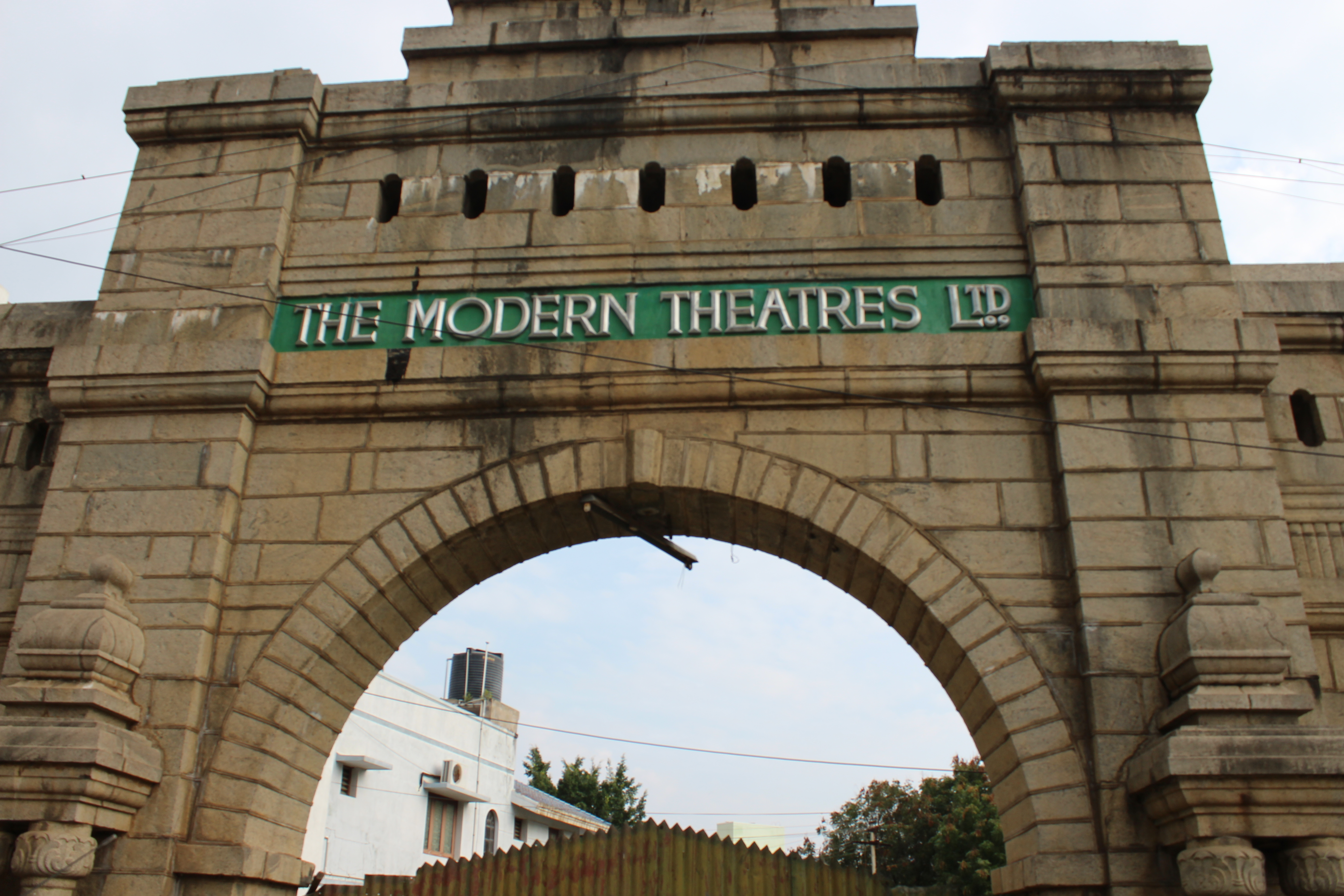

== See also ==
- List of Modern Theatres films
