= Central Studios =

Indian film studio

- Type: Managing Agency, later Private Limited Company
- Industry: Motion pictures
- Founded: 1935
- Defunct: 1958 (de facto)
- Headquarters: Trichy Road, Singanallur, Coimbatore
- Key people: B. Rangaswamy Naidu, Sriramulu Naidu, Samikannu Vincent, R. K. Ramakrishnan Chettiar, Lakshmi Mills

Central Studios was an Indian film studio in the neighbourhood of Singanallur, Coimbatore in Tamil Nadu, started by B.Rangaswamy Naidu (a.k.a. B. R. Naidu) and other prominent industrialists like Swamikannu Vincent of Coimbatore in 1935 to make Tamil and other South Indian language movies. The studio was a major hub of Tamil movie production and notable for its association with many early day Tamil Movie Superstars, directors and script writers etc. and many making their career debuts here. The studio is best remembered for movies like Sivakavi, Velaikari and Haridas.

== History ==
=== Movie industry in Coimbatore ===
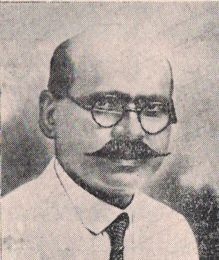
Samikannu Vincent

Movies became a major industry in Coimbatore when in 1905 a South Indian Railways employee Samikannu Vincent purchased a film projector along with some silent films from a Frenchman named Du Pont who had fallen ill on his touring exhibition. Samikannu Vincent then built a business as film exhibitor first by traveling around the country and finally erecting tents theatres for screening films. His tent cinema became popular as he traveled all over the state with his mobile unit. In 1917, Samikannu Vincent built South India's first permanent cinema theatre, Variety Hall Cinema, at TownHall; it is now called ad Delite theatre. As Samikannu Vincent also generated his own electric power for his theatres, he built a series of theatres in and around the city to screen silent films. He also became a distributor for the French Pathé Frères movie projectors. In the early 1930s he launched the Variety Hall Talkies banner to make sound film (a.k.a. talkies) and released a few movies which were mainly shot in Calcutta. Feeling a need to have a movie studio, he was instrumental, along with other industrialists and movie makers, in establishing a fully equipped studio in Coimbatore.

Also during the late 1920s, another firm under Sabapathy was involved in the distributorship of an Italian movie projector company, eventually leading to the manufacture of their own brand of movie projectors in Coimbatore. By the early thirties Coimbatore already had a studio named Premier Cinetone Studio (later renamed Pakshiraja Studios). In 1935 a London-educated graduate, T. R. Sundaram, built a fully equipped movie studio, Modern Theatres, in Salem, and the region became the central hub for movie activity.

=== Studio beginnings ===
Catalogue of Central Studios, Coimbatore

Central Studio was founded by a group of prominent industrialists B. Rangaswamy Naidu, R. K. Ramakrishnan Chettiar (brother of India's first Finance Minister R. K. Shanmukham Chetty), Samikannu Vincent, and another new movie director S. M. Sriramulu Naidu (who joined as a working partner). Studio commenced its operation in 1936 with their first release being Thukkaram in 1937 directed by S. M. Sriramulu Naidu. By the early 1940s the Studio became the central hub of Tamil Movie industry.

== Facilities ==
The Studio is located at Singanallur, near to the Trichy Road in Coimbatore city. The Studio had almost all modern facilities required for a Movie studio along with Sound and film editing labs and technical workshops. The sound engineers and cameramen were all Germans during the 30s and most of the Make-Up team were from Mumbai. The studio also had a music department headed by S. M. Subbaiah Naidu. The studio also boasted the BNC Mitchell Camera, then a Hollywood standard, which cost a whopping Rs 500,000 in the 1930s and the Studio was equipped with 10 KW, 5 KW AND 2 KW lights. Most of the artists and technicians were on monthly payroll.

== Studio system ==
The Silver Jubilee hit movie of 1936 Sivakavi starring M. K. Thyagaraja Bhagavathar, was an in-house production, as well as several socially significant movies. Central Studio released few movies, but the Studio housed lot of other production banners. The most popular being Jupiter Pictures and Pakshiraja Films. Other production houses that operated inside the studio were Narayanan and Company, Manorama Pictures and Venu Pictures. The then popular comedian trio N. S. Krishnan and T. Mathuram had their independent production unit, Ashoka Films inside the premises. They often made their comedy track independently and sold to other Movie producers who later released as ‘side reel’.

== Notable film personalities ==
The studio was a central hub during the early days for Tamil movies first 'Superstars' P. U. Chinnappa and M. K. Thyagaraja Bhagavathar and the popular comedian N. S. Krishnan and T. A. Mathuram. The studio was also a starting point for four of Tamil Nadu state Chief Ministers C. N. Annadurai, M. Karunanidhi, M. G. Ramachandran and V. N. Janaki. The Studio housed famous musicians S. M. Subbaiah Naidu, while G. Ramanathan along with Papanasam Sivan and K. V. Mahadevan composed for some of the Studio Movies. The popular music composer M. S. Viswanathan was an assistant to S. M. Subbiah Naidu. Playback singer T. M. Soundararajan made his early foray as playback singer here so was Lyricist Kannadasan in his initial career. Central Studio was a launch pad for many later day directors like Muktha Srinivasan who was an associate director for 1954 release Sorgavasal. and K. Shankar who was in the editing department. T. R. Rajakumari, Anjali Devi, U. R. Jeevarathinam, Madhuri Devi and Rajasulochana featured in many films shot in Central Studios. Actress Sachu as childhood artist appeared in a few films shot here.

Famous directors who operated out of the Studio were S. M. Sriramulu Naidu, Ellis R. Dungan, A. S. A. Sami, A. P. Nagarajan and popular duo Krishnan–Panju of Parasakthi fame who directed their first movie in Central Studios. India's pioneering Cinematographer Adi Merwan Irani worked in this studio for Sivakavi and Haridas. Sando Chinnappa Thevar, of Devar Films living nearby in Ramanathapuram was a body builder who worked as stunt actor before becoming one of Indias successful movie producers.

== Final years ==
In 1945 S. M. Sriramulu Naidu left Central Studios to start his own Studio called Pakshiraja Studios and B. Rangaswamy Naidu family bought out majority of its shares. During the late 1940s the management leased the Studio to Jupiter Pictures. After B. R. Naidu's demise the Studio management passed on to Lakshmi Mills family who closed it in 1959 as Chennai by then emerged as the major Movie hub and also as a result of other lobbying groups who wanted to keep movie industry out of Coimbatore, as it was then emerging into an Industrial and Educational hub. The Studio with its equipments were leased to other producers in 1958 and continued Film distribution till 1962.

== Present day ==
Most of the Studio structure is still intact as the B. R. Naidu family uses the premises for various industrial activities. Some of the buildings houses Textile production units and small workshops. During the 70s and 80s race car constructor and driver S. Karivardhan used the studio premises to build and test his race cars.

Till 2009 the text impression ‘ Central Studios’ can found at their main entrance gate. Recently in 2010 some structures were pulled down to make way for new developments. Post 2013 the studio premises was split between the family members of B. R. Naidu and though the buildings remain as it, the approach roads are different and still remain private.

== List of major releases ==
#	Year	Title	Language	Production	Lead Cast	Director	Music composer	Release date & Notes
1	1938	Thukkaram	Tamil	Central Studios	Musiri Subramania Iyer, Chokkalinga Bhagavathar, K. Seetha, Meenambal	B. Narayan Rao	R. Balasaraswathi	17 Sep 1938 The iconic Carnatic musician Musiri Subramania Iyer's only movie. .
2	1938	Thukkaram	Telugu	Central Studios	C. S. R. Anjaneyulu, Chokkalinga Bhagavathar, Kamalabai, Balasaraswathi	M. L. Tandon	R. Balasaraswathi	17 Sep 1938 Shot simultaneously along with the Tamil version
3	1939	Rambaiyin Kaadhal	Tamil	Central Studios	K. Sarangkapani, K. L. V. Vasantha, N. S. Krishnan	B. Narayan Rao	Central Studios Orchestra	24 Feb 1939 Debut movie for comedian T. S. Durairaj
4	1939	Prahalada (1939 film)	Tamil	Salem Sankar Films	T. R. Mahalingam, M. R. Santhanalakshmi, R. Balasubramaniam, Nagercoil K. Mahadevan,M. G. Ramachandran, N. S. Krishnan, T. A. Mathuram	B. Narayan Rao	Sharma Brothers	12 Dec 1939
5	1940	Bhooloka Rambai	Tamil	M. Somasundaram (Jupiter Somu) (Salem Shanmugha Films) & M.D. Viswanathan (Vijaya Maruthi Pictures)	K.L.V. Vasantha, T. K. Shanmugam, T.R. Mahalingam, T.S. Balaiah, N.S. Krishnan, T. A. Madhuram and Kumari Rukmini	B. Narayan Rao	G. Ramanathan	14 Jan 1958 S.S. Vasan had just started Gemini Pictures Circuit as distributor, was looking for movies for distribution, called on Rao at Coimbatore and asked him whether he could complete the film in time for Deepavali if he funded the project.
6	1940	Naveena Vikramadityan	Tamil	Ashoka Films	N. S. Krishnan, T. A. Mathuram, T. S. Durairaj, M. R. Swaminathan	K. S. Mani	N. S. Balakrishnan	29 Jun 1940
7	1941	Chandrahari	Tamil	Ashoka Films	N. S. Krishnan, T. A. Mathuram, L. Narayana Rao, Kaka Radhakrishnan	K. S. Mani	N. S. Balakrishnan	As this was a short film, it was package as part 2 with another film Izhandha Kadhal (Part 1)
8	1941	Ezhandha Kadhal	Tamil	Ashoka Films	N. S. Krishnan, T. A. Mathuram, K. P. Kamatchi	K. S. Mani	N. S. Balakrishnan, K. M. Gowrisan	n/a
9	1941	Sathi Murali	Tamil	Central Studios, Saba Films	" M. K. Radha, M.R.Santhanalakshmi,T. R. Mahalingam, Nagercoil K. Mahadevan, L. Narayana Rao, Kali N. Ratnam, S. Varalakshmi, T. A. Mathuram	B. Narayan Rao,T. C. Vadivelu Naicker		n/a
10	1941	Alibabavum 40 Thirudargalum (1941 film)	Tamil	Ashoka Films	"N. S. Krishnan, T. A. Mathuram, M. R. Swaminathan, S. V. Sahasranamam	K. S. Mani	N. S. Balakrishnan	15 Mar 1941
11	1941	Aryamala		Pakshiraja Films, K. S. Narayanan Iyengar	P. U. Chinnappa , M. S. Sarojini, M. R. Santhanalakshmi, N. S. Krishnan	Bomman Irani	G. Ramanathan	19 Oct 1941
12	1942	Prithivirajan	Tamil	Central Studios + Haran Talkies	P. U. Chinnappa, A. Sakunthala, T. S. Balaiah, M. R. Santhanalakshmi, N. S. Krishnan	B. Sampathkumar	G. Ramanathan	29 Apr 1942
13	1943	Jeevana Nataka	Kannada	Gubbi Films (Gubbi Veeranna)	Gubbi Veeranna, Kemparaj Urs, Shanta Hublikar, B. Jayamma	Wahab Kashmiri	S. V. Venkatraman, Ramayyar Shirur, Harmonium Sheshagirirao	01 Jan 1943 Kemparaj Urs, the brother of future Chief Minister of Mysore State, D. Devaraj Urs, made his acting debut in the film.
14	1943	Sivakavi	Sivakavi	Central Studios, Pakshiraja Films	M. K. Thyagaraja Bhagavathar, S. Jayalakshmi, T. R. Rajakumari, N. S. Krishnan	S. M. Sriramulu Naidu	Papanasam Sivan	10 Apr 1943 Shooting started in 1942 with P. K. Raja Sandow as director. Due to disputes between Raja Sandow and producer S. M. Sriramulu Naidu, later took over direction. Script was by Elangovan. Was a major blockbuster all over Madras Presidency.
15	1944	Jagathalaprathapan (1944 film)	Tamil	Central Studios, Pakshiraja Films	P. U. Chinnappa, M. S. Sarojini, M. R. Santhanalakshmi, P. B. Rangachari, U. R. Jeevaratnam, S. Varalakshmi, T. A. Jayalakshmi, T. S. Balaiah, N. S. Krishnan, T. A. Mathuram	S. M. Sriramulu Naidu	G. Ramanathan	07 Mar 1944
16	1944	Haridas	Tamil	Rayal Talkie Distributors	M. K. Thyagaraja Bhagavathar, T. R. Rajakumari, N. C. Vasanthakokilam, N. S. Krishnan	Sundar Rao Nadkarni	Papanasam Sivan, G. Ramanathan	16 Oct 1944 One of the record setting blockbuster hit, released for 1944 Deepavali, it ran continuously in Madras Broadway Theater with full shows for 110 weeks, crossing 1945 and 1946 Deepavali's
17	1945	En Magan (1945 film)	Tamil	Central Studios	N. Krishnamoorthi, U. R. Jeevarathinam, D. Balasubramaniam, Kumari Kamala, C. K. Saraswathi	R. S. Mani	Papanasam Sivan, C. A. Lakshmana Das || 16 Feb 1945	
18	1945	Saalivaahanan	Tamil	Bhaskar Pictures	Ranjan, T. R. Rajakumari, M. G. Ramachandran, K. L. V. Vasantha, N. S. Krishnan	B. Narayan Rao	Nagercoil K. Mahadevan	04 Nov 1945 The film had a love scene sequence between Ranjan and T. R. Rajakumari, in colour which was achieved manual hand-tinting for each frame.
19	1946	Valmiki	Tamil	Central Studios	C. Honnappa Bhagavathar, U. R. Jeevarathinam, T. R. Rajakumari, N. C. Vasanthakokilam	Sundar Rao Nadkarni	Papanasam Sivan	13 Apr 1946 Originally signed with M. K. Thyagaraja Bhagavathar as lead, shooting commenced in 1944 before his arrest in Lakshmikanthan Murder Case. Later, all scenes were re-shot with C. Honnappa Bhagavathar.
20	1946	Vidhyapathi	Tamil	Jupiter Pictures	T. R. Ramachandran, K. Thavamani Devi, D. Balasubramaniam, M. N. Nambiar, D. Premawathi	A. T. Krishnaswami	Attapalli Rama Rao	17 Oct 1946
21	1946	Sri Murugan	Tamil	Jupiter Pictures	Honnappa Bhagavathar, K. Malathi, M. G. Ramachandran, U. R. Jeevaratnam, P. S. Veerappa, Narasimha Bharathi, M. G. Chakrapani, Kali N. Rathnam	M. Somasundaram, V. S. Narayanan	S. M. Subbaiah Naidu, S. V. Venkatraman	27 Oct 1946
22	1947	Asokamala	Sinhala	Sir Chittampalam A. Gardine	Shanthi Kumar, Emaline Dimbulana	Shanthi Kumar, T. R. Goppu	Mohammed Ghouse	09 Apr 1947
23	1947	Rajakumari (1947 film)	Tamil	Jupiter Pictures	M. G. Ramachandran, K. Malathi, M. R. Saminathan, T.S.Balaiah, M. N. Nambiar	A. S. A. Sami	S. M. Subbaiah Naidu	11 Apr 1947
24	1947	Kanjan	Tamil	Jupiter + Central	S. V. Subbaiah, M. N. Nambiar, P. V. Narasimha Bharathi, K. Malathi, M. S. S. Bhagyam	Covai A. Aiyamuthu, T. R. Gopu		11 Nov 1947
25	1948	Bilhanan	Tamil	TKS Brothers	T. K. Shanmugam, T. K. Bhagavathi, M. S. Draupathi	K.V. Srinivasan	T. A. Kalyanam	23 Apr 1948 The story and screenplay by A.S.A. Sami. The song, "Thoondir Puzhuvinaipol” sung by TKS brothers, used lyrics by poet Subramania Bharati. Film producer A. V. Meiyappan, who held copyright to all Bharati's work, sued TKS Brothers for infringement. Later resolved by then Madras State Chief Minister O. P. Ramaswamy Reddiyar when he offered to purchase the rights and make Bharati's works copyright free
26	1948	Abhimanyu (1948 film)	Tamil	Jupiter Pictures	M. G. Ramachandran, S. M. Kumaresan, M. R. Santhanalakshmi, M. G. Chakrapani, P.V.Narasimma bharathi, M. N. Nambiar	A. S. A. Sami	S. M. Subbaiah Naidu, C. R. Subburaman	6 May 1948
27	1948	Mohini (1948 film)	Tamil	Jupiter Pictures , Central Studios	T. S. Balaiah, Madhuri Devi , M. G. Ramachandran, V. N. Janaki	Lanka Sathiyam	S. M. Subbaiah Naidu, C. R. Subburaman	13 Oct 1948
28	1949	Velaikkaari	Tamil	Jupiter Pictures	K. R. Ramasamy, Janaki Ramachandran, M. N. Nambiar	A. S. A. Sami	S. M. Subbaiah Naidu, C. R. Subburaman	25 Feb 1949 The film script was written by C. N. Annadurai (later chief minister of Tamil Nadu), his second film to be based on his plays. ..
29	1949	Kanniyin Kaadhali	Tamil	Jupiter Pictures	Anjali Devi, Madhuri Devi , N. S. Krishnan, T. A. Mathuram	K. Ramnothand, A. K. Sekhar	S. M. Subbaiah Naidu, C. R. Subburaman	06 Aug 1949 The movie featured a dance sequence by the famed sister duo Lalitha and Padmini.
30	1950	Krishna Vijayam	Tamil	Jupiter Pictures	N. C. Vasanthakokilam, P. V. Narasimha Bharathi,	Sundar Rao Nadkarni	S. M. Subbaiah Naidu, C. R. Subburaman	14 Jan 1950 The film featured dance by Lalitha and Padmini
31	1950	Vijayakumari (film)	Tamil	Jupiter Pictures	K. R. Ramaswamy, T. R. Rajakumari, Serukulathur Sama, T. S. Balaiah, Kumari Kamala, P. K. Saraswathi, M. N. Nambiar	A. S. A. Sami	C. R. Subburaman	18 Mar 1950
32	1951	Marmayogi	Tamil	Jupiter Pictures	M. G. Ramachandran, Anjali Devi, Madhuri Devi , M. N. Nambiar	K. Ramnoth	S. M. Subbaiah Naidu, C. R. Subburaman	02 Feb 1951 M. G. Ramachandran played the lead role. First Tamil film to receive an "A" (Adults Only) certificate from Central Film Censor Board.Jupiter Pictures later remade in Telugu as Marmayogi (1964 film) starring N. T. Rama Rao
33	1951	Sudharshan	Tamil	Central Studios + Vauhini Studios (Rayal Talkies)	P. U. Chinnappa, P. Kannamba, (Yogam) Mangalam, Lalitha, T. S. Balaia, D. Balasubramaniam, P. B. Rangachari, C. K. Saraswathi	A. S. A. Sami, Sundar Rao Nadkarni	G. Ramanathan	28 Nov 1951 P. U. Chinnappa the lead hero, died before the film was released. The same story was filmed simultaneously by Gemini Studios as Chakradhari and was released early, while Sudharshan was delayed and was released 3 years later in 1951. Also A. S. A. Sami, Director, was replaced by Sundar Rao Nadkarni.
34	1951	Kaithi	Tamil	Jupiter Pictures	S. Balachandar, S. A. Natarajan, S. Revathi, S. Meenakshi, K. Malathy	S. Balachandar	S. Balachandar	23 Dec 1951
35	1952	Rani (1952 film)	Tamil	Jupiter Pictures	S. Balachander, P. Bhanumathi	L. V. Prasad	C. R. Subburaman, D. C. Dutt	26 Apr 1952 Central + Neptune.
36	1952	Rani (1952 film) (Hindi)	Hindi	Jupiter Pictures	Anoop Kumar, P. Bhanumathi	L. V. Prasad	C. R. Subburaman, D. C. Dutt	26 Apr 1952 Central + Neptune
37	1952	Puyal	Tamil	Pelican Pictures (K. P. George)	G. M. Basheer, M. V. Rajamma, G. M. Gulsar, K. R. Ramsingh	G. Viswanath	S. G. K. Pillai, P. S. Diwakar	25 Jul 1952
38	1952	Zamindar (1952 film)	Tamil	Jupiter Pictures + Sangeetha Pictures (Central )	S. A. Natarajan. Madhuri Devi , M. V. Rajamma, D. Balasubramaniam, T. P. Muthulakshmi	P. V. Krishnan	G. Ramanathan	30 Aug 1952
39	1953	Naalvar	Tamil	M. A. Venu (Sangeetha Pictures)	A. P. Nagarajan, Kumari Thangam, N. N. Kannappa, M. N. Krishnan, Muthulakshmi	V. Krishnan	K. V. Mahadevan	05 Nov 1953
40	1954	Mangalyam (film)	Tamil	M. A. Venu (M. A. V Pictures)	A. P. Nagarajan, Rajasulochana, S. A. Natarajan, B. S. Saroja, A. Karunanidhi, S. Mohana, M. N. Nambiar, C. T. Rajakantham, M. M. A. Chinnapa Devar	K. Somu	K. V. Mahadevan	22 May 1954 The Tamil movie debut of Rajasulochana
41	1954	Sorgavasal	Tamil	Jupiter Pictures + Parimalam Pictures	K. R. Ramaswamy, S. S. Rajendran, Anjali Devi, P. S. Veerappa, Padmini	A. Kasilingam	Viswanathan–Ramamoorthy	28 May 1954 The film was partly shot at Central Studios and Neptune Studios, Adyar, Madras. C. N. Annadurai for the first time was credited for screenplay and dialogues as Arignar Anna.
42	1954	Manasakshi	Malayalam	K. S. Akhileswarayyar (Ishwar Production)	"Prem Nazir, P. Bhaskaran, Kottarakkara Sreedharan Nair, Hemalatha, T. R. Omana, Jose Prakash, P. A. Thomas	G. Viswanath	S. G. K. Pillai	20 Aug 1954 The story of Ammaye Kaanaan (1963) closely resembled this film.
43	1955	Nalla Thangai	Tamil	S. A. Natarajan- Forward Art Films	M. N. Nambiar, Madhuri Devi, Rajasulochana, S. A. Natarajan T. S. Balaiah	S. A. Natarajan	G. Ramanathan	5 Feb 1955Another film with the title Nalla Thangal was produced by Madras Movietones and was released at the end of this year with a different cast and crew.
44	1955	Mullaivanam	Tamil	Arvind Pictures (V. Krishnan)	Sriram, Kumari Rukmini, P. S. Veerappa, A. Karunanidhi	V. Krishnan	K. V. Mahadevan	11 Mar 1955
45	1955	Pennarasi	Tamil	M. A. Venu (M. A. V Pictures)	A. P. Nagarajan, P. Kannamba, Rajasulochana, M. N. Nambiar, P. S. Veerappa	K. Somu	K. V. Mahadevan	07 Apr 1955 Story by A. P. Nagarajan
46	1955	Asai Anna Arumai Thambi	Tamil	Srimathi Pictures (Madhuri Devi )	A. P. Nagarajan, Madhuri Devi , T. R. Ramachandran , V. M. Ezhumalai, Rajasulochana	G. R. Rao	K. V. Mahadevan	29 Jun 1955 Newtone & Film Center
47	1955	Town Bus	Tamil	M. A. Venu (M. A. V Pictures)	N. N. Kannappa, Anjali Devi, A. Karunanidhi, M. N. Rajam	K. Somu	K. V. Mahadevan	13 Nov 1955 Story by A. P. Nagarajan

- The 1947 Sinhala film Asokamala was also shot in Central Studios
- The 1954 Prem Nazir hit movie Manasakshi was produced here.

== See also ==
- Pakshiraja Studios
- Pakshiraja Films
- Jupiter Pictures
- Chamundeshwari Studios

== Sources ==
- Reel-time nostalgia The Hindu
- "Coimbatore Wealth creators". The Hindu. 2 February 2004. Archived from the original on 10 May 2004.
- Baker-turned filmmaker - The Hindu
- Samikannu Vincent, he brought cinema to South - The Hindu
- [Book: Life of a Textile Pioneer Published by Limex Journal]
- [Book: B.Rangaswamy Naidu - Vazhkai Varalaru]
