= Sivakavi =

1943 film by S. M. Sriramulu Naidu

- Theatrical release poster
- Directed by: S. M. Sriramulu Naidu
- Screenplay by: Elangovan
- Produced by: S. M. Sriramulu Naidu
- Starring: M. K. Thyagaraja Bhagavathar; S. Jayalakshmi
- Cinematography: Adi Irani
- Edited by: Surya
- Music by: Papanasam Sivan; G. Ramanathan
- Production company: Pakshiraja Films
- Distributed by: Narayanan & Company
- Release date: 10 April 1943
- Running time: 212 minutes
- Country: India
- Language: Tamil

Sivakavi is a 1943 Indian Tamil-language film directed, initially, by P. K. Raja Sandow and later, S. M. Sriramulu Naidu. It starred M. K. Thyagaraja Bhagavathar, S. Jayalakshmi, Serukalathur Sama, Thirupurambal, T. R. Rajakumari, N. S. Krishnan and T. A. Mathuram. The film's screenplay was written by Elangovan. The film was shot at Central Studios and released by Pakshiraja Films in Coimbatore. The film was released on 10 April 1943.

== Plot ==
Ambalatharasan is a bright young man studying in a gurukulam. He believes knowledge is important as opposed to Amrithavalli who believes in wealth. One day while guarding the crops belonging to the gurukulam, Ambalatharasan expresses his love for Amrithavalli, which she declines as she cannot live in a poor household. Ambalatharasan accepts his situation and asks Amrithavalli to guard the crops while he takes a quick nap. When Ambalatharasan wakes up, he is shocked to see Amrithavalli’s horses grazing the crops, he shoos away the horses but the crops are damaged. Worried and scared Ambalatharasan runs to the kaali devi temple and prays. Impressed by Ambalatharasan’s devotion, kaali devi appears in front of him and grants him powers and names him sivakavi and poyyamozhi – what he says comes true. Sivakavi with his new powers returns to the scene and curses the one horse that is still grazing. The horse dies, Amrithavalli is shocked and cries for forgiveness. Sivakavi uses his power and brings the horse back to life. Meanwhile hearing the news, the teacher, students and Amritha’s father kalingaraya prabu arrive at the scene and come to know of sivakavi’s power. Sivakavi warns Amritha not to insult peasants and poor people.

Later, in her lavish house Amritha says to her maid that she has no interest in ambalatharasan as he is poor and has no future prospects. Kaalidevi disguises as a sanyasini and sings about amirtha’s arrogance. An angry amirtha insults the sanyasini and develops small pox instantly. Amirtha is bedridden and the teacher asks ambalatharasan to use his power and heal amritha. Both visit amritha in her house, amritha agrees to marry ambalatharasan, amabalatharasan heals amritha. Both are married. Saravana muthu another mischievous student vows to get the same powers as ambalatharasan by praying kaalidevi. One day yogambal pranks saravana muthu by disguising herself as kaali devi but muthu calls her bluff and turns the joke on her.

Few years later, sivakavi and amritha are living in poverty. The entire dowry given by amritha’s father is gone. Amritha is visited by yogambal, amritha shares her tragic life story, yogambal insists that amritha push ambalatharasan to make money, which she does. But ambalatharasan is tired of amritha’s whining and her attraction towards wealth and not human values. Two devotees of Lord Muruga visit sivakavi and ask him to sing praise of Lord Murugan as they have built a new temple for him. Sivakavi declines, they offer money, sivakavi rejects the offer saying he would never sing for a child. Witnessing this amritha confronts sivakavi, both of them fight. Sivakavi leaves the house.

After three days of walking sivakavi comes across a saint, who identifies him as poyyamozhi. The saint asks sivakavi to go to Madurai and convince king Vanangamudi pandiyan to form a Tamizh sangam so the language can flourish. Sivakavi agrees and begins his journey, the saint happens to be Lord muruga in disguise. On the way sivakavi is mesmerised by bhajans of women in a temple but is shocked to learn they are blind. He uses his powers and gives them eyesight, the dasi’s thank sivakavi and invite him to their hut. All the other dasi’s visit the hut to see sivakavi and bring him offerings. Sivakavi blesses them and asks one of the dasi’s to keep the gold coins which he’ll collect later.

In Madurai sivakavi meets the king and expresses the saint’s wishes. The king is sceptical, as assembling a Tamizh sangam is a difficult task and he doesn’t think sivakavi is a capable poet. Sivakavi feels insulted and because the king is a devotee of Lord siva he forgives him. The king takes sivakavi to a mandapam filled with stone statues of legendery poets who were part of earlier sangams. Sivakavi sings and one of the statues vouches for him. The king is impressed and names sivakavi as the head of the new sangam.

Few years later sivakavi is invited by cheenakkan a minister in chola king’s court and a poetry aficionado. Sivakavi is impressed by cheenakkan’s honesty and his love for poetry, they become friends. Cheenakkan introduces his wife valli to sivakavi. sivakavi starts to spend a lot of time with cheenakkan in his house. Back home, yogambal comforts amritham and says she’ll send her husband to bring ambalatharasan. Cheenakkan takes sivakavi to the chola court where he enjoys a dance by vanji, the only female member of the court, well versed in singing, dancing and poetry. Vanji antagonises sivakavi straightaway but cheenakkan and the king come in support of sivakavi. The king insults vanji and other poets of the court, stating they have not produced anything worthy in recent years. Outside the court vanji and other poets gather and discuss their future, vanji asks them to wait so she can figure out what to do with sivakavi.

Sivakavi’s place in the court and his friendship with cheenakkan grows day by day. Vanji realises the only way to retain her position is by taking sivakavi’s side. One day she finds sivakavi alone in a garden and expresses her love for him and her intention to marry him. Saravana muthu who is married to yogambal and searching for ambalatharasan is overhearing this conversation. Sivakavi rejects her advances and insults her. Vanji asks sivakavi to keep her embarrassment and shame a secret, he agrees. Vanji believing that they are alone asks sivakavi to make a promise with the moon as witness, he promises. As vanji walks out of the garden, muthu intercepts her and blackmails her that he will reveal the truth to the king. To keep his mouth shut Vanji welcomes muthu to stay in her house for a few days.

The next day in court, vanji accuses sivakavi of rape of an innocent woman. The king and others are shocked. Beacuase he made a promise sivakavi is unable to provide details, but reveals that the moon is his only witness. Vanji ridicules sivakavi, sivakavi request the king to ask the moon, which he does. To everyone’s surprise the moon takes a human form and testifies in front of the court. Sivakavi’s innocence is proved; the king asks vanji to leave the court. When vanji returns home she throws saravana muthu out, as there is no use for him now.

As Sivakavi and Cheenakkan discuss the events of the day, rain intervenes their conversation. Cheenakkan takes Sivakavi to his bedroom, cheenakkan lies in one end of the big bed, Sivakavi hesitates initially but joins him in the center of the bed. Sivakavi falls asleep in the bed, Cheenakkan goes away for a brief moment, Valli walks in and without realising who’s in bed she lies next to Sivakavi and falls asleep. Cheenakkan comes back and sees his friend and wife in the same bed. In his heart he knows both of them are pure and noble, so without suspecting he lies next to Sivakavi. The next morning Seenappan wakes first and goes on with his day, after sometime his wife wakes up and is shocked to see Sivakavi. A maid witnesses Valli waking up next to Sivakavi and informs this to Vanji. Vanji, without wasting time notifies the king.

The gossip is spread like wild fire, everywhere sivakavi goes he hears this misinformation. Cheenakkan clarifies the situation to the king and the king accepts. But sivakavi is confused and worried that a good man’s name is being tarnished. Sivakavi meets saravana muthu in the street, who tells him to leave immediately. Both leave the place and cheenakkan is worried and sends his guards to find sivakavi. Vanji takes a victory lap as sivakavi has left the kingdom. She is bitten by a snake and dies instantly. On the way sivakavi & saravana muthu split. Sivakavi comes to the dasi’s house to collect the gold coins. The dasi’s are now rich and won’t open the door. Sivakavi curses them back to blindness. The dasi’s regret their behaviour and ask for forgiveness, he gives back their sight. With the gold coins, Sivakavi begins his journey to see amritham. On the way sivakavi is accompanied by a stranger. They take shelter at night, they are given food but the young man steals a cup. The next day, the young man takes food from another house and gifts the cup. Sivakavi notices the strange behaviour of the young man but is unable to do anything. Later sivakavi confronts the stranger and ask about him. The stranger transforms from a young man to a hunter. The hunter asks for the gold coins, but sivakavi refuses saying he’s saving it for his wife. The hunter asks sivakavi to sing about him if he wants to keep the gold. Sivakavi sings, after the song the hunter transforms to infant lord muruga. Sivakavi realises the god’s play and throws away the coins and accepts lord muruga as his god.

Yogambal visits amritha and informs about ambalatharasan, but insists she take it slowly. An empty handed ambalatharasan enters the house, amritha starts complaining and they get in to fight. An angry ambalatharasan yells and gold coins pour from the roof. He asks amritha to live with it and that he is leaving her forever. Amritha is broken, yogambal walks in and notices the gold coins in the middle of the house. Amritha blames everything on yogambal, but yogambal fires back saying, amritha is responsible for her loss. Now alone, amritha loses her mind and runs away, she asks forgiveness from her husband. Sivakavi wishes his wife that she surrender at lord muruga’s feet and begin her journey towards mukti. Amrita becomes devotional and sees lord muruga at the other side of the pond, she slowly walks in to the pond and drowns.

Sivakavi arrives at cheenakkan’s home but learns of his death and the funeral is about to happen. At the funeral valli also prepares to die along with her husband. Sivakavi rushes to the funeral and notices people suspecting valli’s character. Sivakavi explains everything and curses everyone for their ignorance. As the pyre is set on fire sivakavi prays that he be accepted as well, the pyre opens, sivakavi walks in the fire. Lord muruga appears and changes the fire to flower. Sivakavi, cheenakkan, valli all are brought back to life. Lord muruga preaches that the god’s may have different forms but the divine is one.

== Cast ==
Male cast

- M. K. Thyagaraja Bhagavathar as Sivakavi
- Serukalathur Sama as Cheenakkan
- P. B. Rangachari as Independent Bandyman
- V. Sundarama Iyer as Pedagogue
- D. Balasubramaniam as Chozha Natarajan
- S. Rajam as Old Man, Boy, Hunter
- N. S. Krishnan as Saravana Muthu
- Nat Annaji Rao as Kalingaraya Prabhu
- Vasudeva Pillai as Sambantham Pillai
- Master Sethuraman as Murugan
- Ramaiah Shastri as Chozha's scholar
- Sundara Bhagavathar as Chozha's scholar
- Pulimootai Ramasamy as Saravana Muthu's friend

Female cast

- S. Jayalakshmi as Amrithavalli (Sivakavi's wife)
- M. S. Thirupurambal as Valli (Cheenakkan's wife)
- T. R. Rajakumari as Vanji
- T. A. Mathuram as Yogambal
- D. Kappalakshmi as Dasi
- K. R. Rayalakshmi as Dasi
- Pushpakanthammal as Dasi
- Kannapani Bai as Dasi
- C. K. Saraswathi as Amrithavalli's friend

== Production ==
Principal photography began in 1942 with P. K. Raja Sandow as the director. But soon afterwards, there were disputes between him and the producer S. M. Sriramulu Naidu. With the progress of the filming, the disagreement between the two reached such high proportions that eventually, Sriramulu Naidu dismissed Raja Sandow and took over the reins himself. The script for the film was written by Elangovan.

T. R. Rajakumari, in one of her early roles, plays a court dancer or devadasi who falls in love with M. K. Thyagaraja Bhagavathar. S. Jayalakshmi — defying the social conventions of the era for a married woman — played the character of Amrithavalli. Her brother S. Rajam played the role of Lord Muruga. Her father Sundaram Iyer played the role of a teacher of young Srikavi in sequences with N. S. Krishnan and others.

== Soundtrack ==
The soundtrack of the film consisted of 29 songs were composed by Papanasam Sivan who also penned the lyrics for all songs while G. Ramanthan took care of orchestration. Sivan originally penned the song "Vadaname Chandra Bhimbamo" as "Mugam Adhu Chandra Bimbamo". When M. K. Thyagaraja Bhagavathar pointed out to Sivan how "Mugam Adhu" sounded like "Muhammad", Sivan changed it to "Vadaname". The song "Soppana Vazhvil" was based on Vijayanagari raga which resembles Sivaranjini raga. The song "Amba Manam" is based on Pantuvarali raga. The song "Vallalai Paadum" is based on Senchuruti raga. The song "Vasantharuthu" is based on Vasantha raga. The song "Kavalayai" is based on Natakurinji raga. The song "Vadhaname" is based on Sindhubairavi raga. The song "Ellam Sivan Seyal" is based on Thodi raga. The song "Manam Kanidhe " is based on Rathipatipriya raga.

The soundtrack was well received with the songs particularly "Soppana Vazhvil" and "Vadanamae" were well received. G. Dhananjayan said in his book Pride of Tamil Cinema that the songs contributed to the film's success. According to critic Randor Guy, the film is remembered for its scintillating songs mostly rendered by Thyagaraja Bhagavathar. Singer Charulatha Mani wrote for The Hindu on the song "Vallalai" that, "M.K. Thyagaraja Bhagavathar’s voice is at its pliable best in this piece, and challenging sangatis flow unfettered, like liquid gold". For the song "Vadhaname", she said "the complete octave is explored with splendid vocalisation in ‘...Madura Gaanamo...’, in lightning speed".

All lyrics are written by Papanasam Sivan.

No.	Title	Lyrics	Singer(s)	Length
1.	"Soppana Vaazhvil"	Papanasam Sivan	M. K. Thyagaraja Bhagavathar	3:11
2.	"Amba Manamkanindhu"	Papanasam Sivan	M. K. Thyagaraja Bhagavathar	3;23
3.	"Naattiya Kalaiyae"	Papanasam Sivan	M. K. Thyagaraja Bhagavathar	2:55
4.	"Vallalalai Paadum Vaayaal"	Papanasam Sivan	M. K. Thyagaraja Bhagavathar	3:02
5.	"Mannam Kanindhae"	Papanasam Sivan	M. K. Thyagaraja Bhagavathar	2:34
6.	"Vadhaname"	Papanasam Sivan	M. K. Thyagaraja Bhagavathar	2:45
7.	"Vasantha Ruthu"	Papanasam Sivan	M. K. Thyagaraja Bhagavathar, S. Jayalakshmi	2:32
8.	"Thiruvarul Thara"	Papanasam Sivan	M. K. Thyagaraja Bhagavathar	1:57
9.	"Maakaali Annaiye"	Papanasam Sivan	M. K. Thyagaraja Bhagavathar	1:24
10.	"Sambho Sankara Gowreesa"	Papanasam Sivan	M. K. Thyagaraja Bhagavathar	0:54
11.	"Vaasamalar Madanthai"	Papanasam Sivan	M. K. Thyagaraja Bhagavathar	1:16
12.	"Thamiyen Painthamizh"	Papanasam Sivan	M. K. Thyagaraja Bhagavathar	2:15
13.	"Kooththaal Than Mooththaal"	Papanasam Sivan	M. K. Thyagaraja Bhagavathar	0:51
14.	"Ungalile Yaan Oruvan"	Papanasam Sivan	M. K. Thyagaraja Bhagavathar	1:14
15.	"Sithaye Ye Sithaye"	Papanasam Sivan	M. K. Thyagaraja Bhagavathar	3:03
16.	"Sree Kalyana Guna"	Papanasam Sivan	M. K. Thyagaraja Bhagavathar	3:20
17.	"Payirai Thinnum Maattai"	Papanasam Sivan	N. S. Krishnan, T. A. Mathuram	0:57
18.	"Pothum Pothume"	Papanasam Sivan	N. S. Krishnan, T. A. Mathuram	2:00
Total length:				39:55

== Release ==
Sivakavi was released on 10 April 1943. The film was a major success and ran for a prolonged period even in non-Tamil speaking areas in the Madras Presidency. 7 years later, the film was re-released with some colour sequence.

== Bibliography ==
- Dhananjayan, G. (2014). Pride of Tamil Cinema: 1931–2013. Blue Ocean Publishers. OCLC 898765509.
