= Seemanthini =

Seemanthini may refer to:

- Seemanthini (1936 film), an Indian Tamil-language film directed by Ellis R. Dungan
- Seemanthini (1978 film), an Indian Malayalam-language film directed by P. G. Vishwambharan
