= Manthiri Kumari =

1950 film by Ellis R. Dungan

- Theatrical release poster
- Directed by: Ellis R. Dungan; T. R. Sundaram
- Written by: M. Karunanidhi
- Based on: Manthiri Kumari (play) by M. Karunanidhi
- Produced by: T. R. Sundaram
- Starring: M. G. Ramachandran; M. N. Nambiar; S. A. Natarajan; Madhuri Devi; G. Sakunthala
- Cinematography: J. G. Vijayam
- Edited by: L. Balu
- Music by: G. Ramanathan
- Production company: Modern Theatres
- Release date: 24 June 1950
- Running time: 163 minutes
- Country: India
- Language: Tamil

Manthiri Kumari (transl. The Minister's Daughter) is a 1950 Indian Tamil-language historical fiction film directed by Ellis R. Dungan, starring M. G. Ramachandran, M. N. Nambiar, Madhuri Devi and G. Sakunthala. The screenplay was written by M. Karunanidhi based on his play of the same name, itself inspired by an incident from the Tamil epic Kundalakesi. This was the last Tamil film directed by Dungan and is considered to be among the most successful films of that decade. Shortly after directing this film, Dungan left the Tamil film industry.

== Plot ==
The King of Mullai Nadu is heavily influenced by his Raja guru (head priest), played by M. N. Nambiar. The guru schemes to have his son, Parthiban (S. A. Natarajan), appointed as the army's general, but the King chooses the noble Veera Mohan (MGR) instead. Enraged, Parthiban becomes a bandit and begins raiding the countryside, leading a double life as a courtier by day and a marauder by night.

Parthiban desires to marry the princess, Jeevarekha (G. Shakuntala), who is in love with Veera Mohan. He sends a secret message intended for the princess, but it is mistakenly delivered to Amudhavalli (Madhuri Devi), the minister's daughter. When Amudhavalli meets him, Parthiban seduces her, pretending to be in love while secretly planning to use her for his own ends.

Meanwhile, the King orders Veera Mohan to capture the bandit. Veera Mohan succeeds and brings Parthiban before the royal court. To secure his son's release, the Raja guru arranges a trial before a statue of a goddess. Amudhavalli, now devoted to Parthiban, hides behind the statue and declares his innocence, tricking her father and the King into believing it was a divine proclamation. Convinced by the "miracle," the King releases Parthiban and exiles Veera Mohan.

Parthiban marries Amudhavalli, while Princess Jeevarekha flees the kingdom to join Veera Mohan in exile. Although Parthiban promises Amudhavalli he will abandon his life of crime, he secretly continues his banditry, spurred on by his father. Soon, Parthiban's bandits attack Veera Mohan and abduct Jeevarekha. Growing suspicious of her husband's nightly excursions, Amudhavalli follows him to the bandits' den. Disguised as a warrior, she arrives just in time to save Jeevarekha from being assaulted by Parthiban.

To silence her, Parthiban lures Amudhavalli to a cliff. There, he reveals his treachery and his father's plot to assassinate the King. Feigning a final wish to worship him, Amudhavalli circles Parthiban three times before pushing him off the cliff to his death. Traumatized by her husband's betrayal, she becomes a Buddhist nun.

Veera Mohan returns to the kingdom in disguise and foils the Raja guru's attempt to murder the King, but is mistakenly accused of the crime himself. During the trial, Amudhavalli arrives and reveals the entire plot, exposing the Raja guru and exonerating Veera Mohan. Before she can be arrested, the Raja guru fatally stabs her. With the conspiracy revealed, the Raja guru is jailed, and Veera Mohan is reunited with Princess Jeevarekha.

== Cast ==
Cast according to the opening credits of the film

Male cast

- M. G. Ramachandar as Veera Mohan
- M. N. Nambiar as Rajaguru
- S. A. Natarajan as Parthiban
- C. V. Nayagam
- Sivasooriyan as King
- K. V. Srinivasan
- A. Karunanidhi as Bhoopalam
- Soundar

Female cast

- Madhuri Devi as Amudhavalli
- Sakunthala as Jeevarekha
- K. S. Angamuthu
- Muthulakshmi as Karpagam

Dance

- Lalitha-Padmini-Ragini
- Kumari Kamala
- Kumari Vanaja

== Production ==
Manthiri Kumari is an adaptation of a play by M. Karunanidhi, which was itself based on an incident from the Tamil epic poem Kundalakesi. After producing Ponmudi (1950), directed by Ellis R. Dungan, producer T. R. Sundaram of Modern Theatres hired Dungan to direct the film adaptation; the credits ultimately list both men as co-directors.

For the lead role, they cast M. G. Ramachandran. Although he had played supporting characters in many of Dungan's earlier films, Ramachandran had recently achieved success as a leading man in Rajakumaari (1947) and Marudhanaattu Ilavarasi (1950).

== Soundtrack ==
The music was composed by G. Ramanathan.

Song	Singers	Lyrics	Length
"Vaaraay Nee Vaaraay"	Thiruchi Loganathan & Jikki	A. Maruthakasi	02:52
"Isai Kalaiye Inidhaana"	M. L. Vasanthakumari		03:32
"Ulavum Thendral"	Thiruchi Loganathan & Jikki		03:17
"Kaadhal Baliyaagi"	M. L. Vasanthakumari		02:45
"Ubakaram Seibavarukke.... Annam Itta Vittile"	T. M. Soundararajan	A. Maruthakasi	02:07
"Manam Pola Vaazhvu Peruvome"	M. L. Vasanthakumari & Jikki		02:38
"Kannadichi Yaarai Neeyum"	A. P. Komala		03:29
"Porakka Poguthu"	A. Karunanidhi & T. P. Muthulakshmi		01:18
"Aahaahaahaa Vaazhvile"	M. L. Vasanthakumari	Ka. Mu. Sheriff	03:07
"O Raja O Rani Indha Ezhaiyeliya"	P. Leela, U. R. Chandra & N. Lalitha		05:21
"Anthisaayura Neram Mandhaarai Chedi Oram"		A. Maruthakasi	02:52
"Pengalinaal"	Jikki		01:54
"Ennum Pozhuthil Inbam"	M. L. Vasanthakumari		01:45
"En Erumai Kannukutti"	Master Subbaiah	M. Karunanidhi	02:53
"Aadhavan Udhitthu Tamarai Malarndhadhu"	K. V. Janaki		04:31

== Reception ==
The film was released in June 1950 and became a major box office success, besides attaining cult status for its depiction of a strong, independent and non-submissive woman.
