= Madhuri Devi =

Tamil film actress (1927–1990)

- கிளாரா
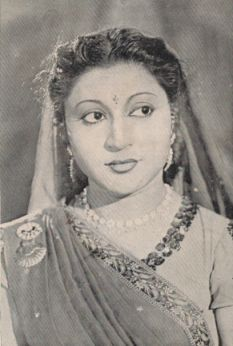
- Madhuri Devi
- Born: Clara; 19 September 1927; Royapuram, Madras
- Died: June 1990 (aged 62)
- Occupations: actress and stage actress
- Years active: 1939 - 1962
- Spouse: Santhi Mukharjee
- Parent(s): Soosai Mudhaliyar, Manoranjidham

Madhuri Devi (19 September 1927 – June 1990) was a lead actress in Tamil films from the late 1940s until the 1950s. She was paired opposite leading heroes like M. K. Thyagaraja Bhagavathar and M. G. R and known for acting in the films Manthiri Kumari, Marmayogi, (1951), and Devaki (1951).

== Early life ==
Madhuri Devi was born on 19 September 1927, as Clara, at Royapuram, Madras (Chennai) to Soosai Mudhaliyar, Manoranjidham. Prior to acting in cinema, she stayed in North Madras and acted in Christian dramas. She had the ability to act in three roles in the same drama. Madhuri avoided the early cinema opportunities that came her way; latterly she agreed to act in films and changed her name to Madhuri Devi.

== Career ==
She entered the Tamil film industry in 1938, her debut film as Ambikapathy (1937). In film Pandurangan (1938), in which she played second heroine. Her next film Lakshmi Vijayam (1947), where she played dual role. She played a comedian in 1940's. Marmayogi (1951), was Madhuri first film with M. G. Ramachandran. Then followed her films that included Mohini, En Thangai, Kanniyin Kaadhali, Ponmudi and Manthiri Kumari. She acted not only as heroine but also played as Vamp and she was comedian in the films Vaayadi (1940) and Poli Panchali (1940). In Kanniyin Kaadhali (1949), where she played three roles in twins Prince Adithyan and Princess Chandrika, later shipwrecked young lady, who disguised as a young man Kalaimani. In the film Ponmudi (1950) starred with P. V. Narasimha Bharathi acted in the film and hired the revdution. She drew applause for her performance as a rich girl in the Sivaji Ganesan starrer Manidhanum Mirugamum (1953). She left cinema around the year 1962, but came back for a guest role in the film Vetri Thirumagal in 1978.

== Personal life ==
She was born as Clara and from a Christian family. Devi married her father's Bengali friend's son Shanti Mukharjee. She died in 1990 after her health suffered a big set back.

== Filmography ==
Year	Title	Role	Note(s)	Ref.
1937	Ambikapathy	(uncredited role)	Debut film	
1938	Paandurangan			
1940	Poli Panchali			
1940	Vaayaadi			
1947	Aayiram Thalai Vaangi Apoorva Chinthamani	Thampathi		
1948	Lakshmi Vijayam	Amutha/Kumutha		
1948	Mohini			
1949	Kanniyin Kaadhali	Princess Chandrika/Kalaimani		
1950	Manthiri Kumari	Amuthavalli		
1950	Ponmudi			
1951	Devaki	Leela		
1951	Marmayogi	Kalavathi		
1951	Rajambal	Lokasundari		
1952	En Thangai	Rajam		
1952	Kumari			
1952	Manavathi			
1952	Thai Ullam	Vasundhara		
1952	Velaikaran			
1952	Zamindar			
1953	Inspector			
1953	Manithan			
1953	Manidhanum Mirugamum			
1953	Rohini			
1955	Asai Anna Arumai Thambi	Kannamma		
1955	Nalla Thangai			
1955	Nalla Thangal			
1956	Ondre Kulam			
1957	Pudhu Vazhvu	Subha		
1959	Athisaya Penn	Lally		
1959	Mala Oru Mangala Vilakku			
1960	Thozhan			
1978	Vetri Thirumagal			
