= Devaki (1951 film) =

- Poster
- Directed by: R. S. Mani
- Written by: Mu. Karunanidhi
- Starring: N. N. Kannappa; V. N. Janaki
- Cinematography: J. G. Vijayam
- Edited by: L. Balu
- Music by: G. Ramanathan
- Production company: Ganapathi Pictures
- Distributed by: Modern Theatres
- Release date: 21 June 1951
- Country: India
- Language: Tamil

Devaki (/ðeɪ.vəki/) is a 1951 Indian Tamil language film directed by R. S. Mani and written by Mu. Karunanidhi. The film stars N. N. Kannappa and V. N. Janaki. It was released on 21 June 1951.

== Cast ==
The list is adapted from the song book.

Male cast

- N. N. Kannappa as Durai
- S. Balachander as Raja
- M. N. Nambiar as Gopu
- D. Balasubramanyam as Raghunath
- T. N. Sivathanu as Secretary
- A. Karunanidhi as Govindan
- S. M. Thirupathisami as Meiyappar
- A. Ganapathi as Kandavel
- V. M. Ezhumalai as Doctor
- M. N. Krishnan as Student
- T. M. Soundar Rajan as Beggar
- P. S. Subbaiah as Unemployed Person

Female cast

- V. N. Janaki as Devaki
- Madhuri Devi as Leela
- R. Bharathi as Pappa
- S. R. Janaki as Kunjammal
- M. Radha Bai as Student's Association President
- M. D. Krishna Bai as Women's Association President
- Baby Rani Vasanthi as Selvamani

Dance

- Lalitha
- Padmini
- Ragini
- Kumari Kamala

== Soundtrack ==
Music was composed by G. Ramanathan and lyrics were penned by A. Maruthakasi, Ka. Mu. Sheriff and Kannadasan.

| Song | Singers | Lyrics | Length |
|---|---|---|---|
| "Perinbame Vaazhvile Endrume" | Thiruchi Loganathan & P. Leela | A. Maruthakasi | 04:13 |
| "Illaram Kaapadhuve" | N. L. Ganasaraswathi | | 03:03 |
| "Naan Kaanbeno Sodhariyaale" | P. Leela & P. G. Krishnaveni (Jikki) | | 04:48 |
| "Munnaalil Aandavane...Ippo Theeradha Thuyaraale" | T. M. Soundararajan | | 03:59 |
| "Annaiye Naan Anaadhai" | N. L. Ganasaraswathi | | 02:50 |
| "Hello My Dear Hello" | Thiruchi Loganathan & N. L. Ganasaraswathi | | 03:49 |
| "Inbam Kaanben Naane" | Jikki | | 02:54 |
| "Tea Tea Soodaana Tea" | Jikki, A. G. Rathnamala & U. R. Chandra | | 06:20 |
| "Chandhiranai Vaanam... Uyir Vaazhveno" | N. L. Ganasaraswathi | | 02:26 |
| "I Am Come From London" | | | |
| "Vanakkam.... Ennathaan Pithaithaalum" | P. Leela & Jikki | | 02:50 |
| "Munnetram.... Aangal Mattum Illai" | S. Balachander | | 03:29 |
| "Muzhuthundu.... Pengal Mattum Illai" | Jikki | | 02:38 |
| "Mel Naattu.... Pasiyaale Vaadurom" | Master Subbaiah | | 02:43 |
| "Ariro Aaaraaro Anbe" | P. Leela | | 03:15 |
| "Paarinil Pudhu Vaazvu" | P. Leela & Jikki | | 02:33 |
