= Ambikapathy and Amaravathi =

Ambikapathy and Amaravathi is a celebrated tragic romance in Tamil folklore and literature, frequently referred to as the Tamil equivalent of William Shakespeare's Romeo and Juliet. The legend recounts the forbidden love affair between Ambikapathy, a talented young poet and son of the legendary court poet Kambar, and Amaravathi, a Chola princess and daughter of the reigning emperor Kulothunga III.

== See also ==
- Ambikapathy (1957 film)
- Ambikapathy (1937 film)
