= N. Lalitha Bhanu =

Carnatic singer (1931–2020)

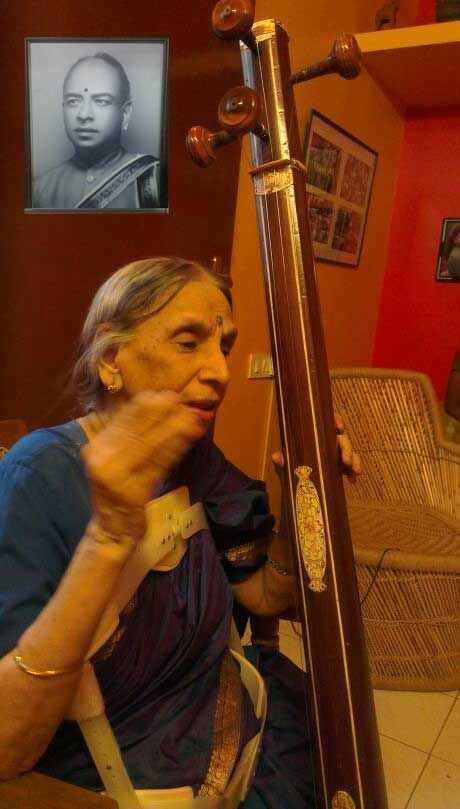
- Carnatic vocalist

Background information
- Born: Narayana Bhagavathar Lalitha; 19 August 1931; Thiruvananthapuram
- Died: 20 August 2020 (aged 89) Chennai, Tamil Nadu, India
- Genres: Film music (playback singing), Indian classical music
- Occupation: Singer
- Instrument: Vocalist
- Years active: 1950–1997

Lalitha Bhanu was a Carnatic singer. She has also sung a few songs for Malayalam and Tamil films as a playback singer.

== Early life ==
Lalitha was born at Trivandrum, Kerala, as the daughter of Narayana Bhagavathar and Parvathy ammal on 19 August 1931.
Her father, Narayana Bhagavathar was a violinist and one of the three Trivandrum Brothers. The brothers were Asthana Vidwans (in-house musicians) at the Royal Palace of Trivandrum. She learnt her initial lessons from K. R. Kumaraswamy. Afterwards she joined the Swati Tirunal College of Music, Thiruvananthapuram. Semmangudi Srinivasa Iyer was the principal of this college. She received training directly from him. When the family moved from Trivandrum to Madras (now Chennai), Srinivasa Iyer directed her to Musiri Subramania Iyer. She learned many Kritis for about 8 years from Musiri Subramania Iyer. Musiri even made Lalitha sing all the varnams in his own style, thereby imbibing in her the “Musiri bhani”. She learnt many kritis from Papanasam Sivan,

== Music career ==
Her first public concert was staged at Mavelikkara (Kerala). She was an artiste in All India Radio and sang for almost 50 years at various radio stations of the AIR including Pondichery and Chennai. She had performed at the Tyagaraja Aradhana.

== Playback singer ==
Lalitha had sung in a few Malayalam and Tamil films as a playback singer. She began her film career with Ponkathir, a Malayalam language film released in 1953. The traditional song "Anjana Sreedhara" was a hit. When this film was made in Tamil with the title Irulukkuppin she sang for that too. She has sung under several music directors including Br Lakshmanan, V. Dakshinamoorthy, G. Ramanathan, Ghantasala, Pendyala Nageshwara Rao and C. N. Pandurangan.

== List of film songs ==
Year	Film	Language	Song	Lyrics	Music	Co-singers
1950	Ponmudi	Tamil	Vaanam Kumuruthamma		G. Ramanathan	U. R. Chandra
1950	Manthiri Kumari	Tamil	O Raja O Rani		G. Ramanathan	P. Leela & U. R. Chandra
1950	Chandrika	Tamil	Malar Ser Manimaalai	P. Bhaskaran	V. Dakshinamoorthy	
1950	Chandrika	Malayalam	Choriyuka Madhumaari Nilaave	P. Bhaskaran	V. Dakshinamoorthy	
1952	Amma	Tamil	Anaivarum Varuveer	Chidambaram Varadarajan	V. Dakshinamoorthy	
1952	Amma	Tamil	Varuga Varuga Yen Sodharikarl	Chidambaram Varadarajan	V. Dakshinamoorthy	
1952	Dharma Devatha	Telugu	Sukhamu Chilikinchu Aanandakiraname		C. R. Subburaman	
1952	Dharma Devatha	Telugu	Chinduleyavoyi Chinna Krishnayya	Samudrala Sr.	C. R. Subburaman	B. N. Rao & Jikki
1952	Dharma Devathai	Tamil	Aananda Leelai Tharum	Thanjai N. Ramaiah Dass	C. R. Subburaman	
1952	Dharma Devathai	Tamil	Anbaai Odi Vaadaa	Thanjai N. Ramaiah Dass	C. R. Subburaman	C. R. Subburaman & Jikki
1952	En Thangai	Tamil	Meelaa Thuyaraamo...Kangal Irandum	Narasimhan	C. N. Pandurangan	
1952	En Thangai	Tamil	Naalukku Naal Paarkira Podhe	A. Maruthakasi	C. N. Pandurangan	
1952	Sankranti	Telugu	Polame Mana Jeevithamu	Balijepalli Lakshmikanta Kavi	G. Aswathama	A. M. Rajah
1952	Sankranti	Telugu	Viraaliketu Thaalane	Balijepalli Lakshmikanta Kavi	G. Aswathama	A. M. Rajah
1953	Petrathai	Tamil	Penmani Nalla Kanmani	M. S. Subramaniam	Pendyala Nageshwara Rao	Ghantasala
1953	Ponkathir	Malayalam	Anjana Sreedharaa	Traditional	Br Lakshmanan	
1953	Ponkathir	Malayalam	Aanandavaasam Amaravilaasam	Thirunainar Kurichi Madhavan Nair	Br Lakshmanan	
1953	Ponkathir	Malayalam	Pranayamohana Swapnam	Thirunainar Kurichi Madhavan Nair	Br Lakshmanan	Gokulapalan
1953	Ponkathir	Malayalam	Sukhame Sukhame	Thirunainar Kurichi Madhavan Nair	Br Lakshmanan	Kamukara Purushothaman & Kaviyoor C. K. Revamma
1953	Ponkathir	Malayalam	Paarirulmoodi Paathayaake	Thirunainar Kurichi Madhavan Nair	Br Lakshmanan	
1953	Ponkathir	Malayalam	Ullaasam Ulakellam	Thirunainar Kurichi Madhavan Nair	Br Lakshmanan	Mehboob & Kaviyoor C. K. Revamma
1954	Avakasi	Malayalam	Manoharamithaha	Thirunainar Kurichi Madhavan Nair	Br Lakshmanan	
1954	Avakasi	Malayalam	En Jeevitha Sukhamaya	Thirunainar Kurichi Madhavan Nair	Br Lakshmanan	Kamukara Purushothaman
1954	Avakasi	Malayalam	Kaliyodamithil	Thirunainar Kurichi Madhavan Nair	Br Lakshmanan	Kamukara Purushothaman
1954	Avakasi	Malayalam	Vava En Deva	Thirunainar Kurichi Madhavan Nair	Br Lakshmanan	Kamukara Purushothaman
1954	Avakasi	Malayalam	Tharani Thanga Nilave	Thirunainar Kurichi Madhavan Nair	Br Lakshmanan	
1954	Irulukkup Pin	Tamil	Anjana Sreedharaa	Nagai Mani	Br Lakshmanan	
1954	Irulukkup Pin	Tamil	Aananda Vasam Amara Vilasam	Nagai Mani	Br Lakshmanan	
1954	Irulukkup Pin	Tamil	Mathura Mohana Inba Ninaivaal	Nagai Mani	Br Lakshmanan	Kamukara Purushothaman
1954	Irulukkup Pin	Tamil	Sugame Sugam Sorkka Sugame	Nagai Mani	Br Lakshmanan	Kamukara Purushothaman & Kaviyoor C. K. Revamma
1954	Irulukkup Pin	Tamil	Kaarirul Moodi	Nagai Mani	Br Lakshmanan	
1954	Irulukkup Pin	Tamil	Ullasam Ulagellam Uyirum	Nagai Mani	Br Lakshmanan	Mehboob & Kaviyoor C. K. Revamma
1954	Irulukkup Pin	Tamil	Paadu Mohanamai Padu	Nagai Mani	Br Lakshmanan	
1954	Irulukkup Pin	Tamil	Vandaadum Poovea Malarsolai	Nagai Mani	Br Lakshmanan	
1954	Chandraharam	Tamil	Laali Jaya Laali	Thanjai N. Ramaiah Dass	Ghantasala	
1954	Chandraharam	Telugu	Laali Jaya Laali	Pingali Nagendra Rao	Ghantasala	
1954	Avan Yaar	Tamil	En Jeevitha Sukam	Kambadasan	Br Lakshmanan	Kamukara Purushothaman
1954	Avan Yaar	Tamil	Manoharam Idhaahaa	Kambadasan	Br Lakshmanan	
1954	Viduthalai	Tamil	Abalai Naan Thayanithiye	Velavan	Lakshman Raghunath	
1952	Kalam Marunnu	Malayalam	Ohoy Thathinanthanam	O. N. V. Kurup	G. Devarajan & Br Lakshmanan	K. S. George, K. Sulochana, P. Leela & Lekshmi
1952	Kalam Marunnu	Malayalam	Ambili Muthachan	O. N. V. Kurup	G. Devarajan & Br Lakshmanan	P. Leela & Lekshmi
1955	Harishchandra	Malayalam	Kaattumulle Naanam Kaatteedalle	Thirunainar Kurichi Madhavan Nair	Br Lakshmanan	C. S. Radha Devi
1956	Avar Unarunnu	Malayalam	Paloli Poonila	Pala Narayanan Nair	V. Dakshinamoorthy	L. P. R. Varma
1956	Avar Unarunnu	Malayalam	Puthughivitha Ha Kamitam	Pala Narayanan Nair	V. Dakshinamoorthy	Kamukara Purushothaman

== List of Carnatic songs ==
All these songs are available on YouTube.

No.	Kriti	Ragam	Composer
1	Elakudhaya	Sankarabharanam	Pallavi Duraiswami Iyer
2	Rama rama gunaseema	Simhendra madhyamam	Swathi Thirunal
3	Ma Janaki	Kambhoji	Saint Thyagaraja
4	Marivere Dikkevarayaa	Shanmugapriya	Patnam Subramanya Iyer
5	Namoralakimpavemi	Devagandhari	Saint Thyagaraja
6	Sarasijanapasodhari	Naagagandhari	Muthuswami Dikshithar
7	Kamajanaka	Gowlai	Swathi Thirunal
8	Parvatharajakumari	Sriranjani	Muthuswami Dikshithar
9	Jaya Jaya Raghurama	Sahana	Swathi Thirunal
10	Thaye Dayaipurivaye	Ranjani	Swarna Venkatesa Dikshithar
11	Smarajanaka	Behag	Swathi Thirunal

== Titles and awards ==
Lalitha Bhanu was conferred with the title "Ganabooshanam" and was presented with a Tambura (with an emblem of Swathi Tirunal) by Semmangudi Srinivasa Iyer.

== Family life ==
Lalitha was married to Perumal Bhanu Bharadwaj. They had three children including two daughters and a son, Anand Bhanu Bharadwaj.

== Death ==
She died on 20 August 2020 at Chennai.

== Bibliography ==
- List of Malayalam songs sung by Ganabhooshanam N. Lalitha
