= Nannambikkai =

- Theatrical release poster
- Directed by: K. Vembu; Charlie
- Screenplay by: S. Ramanathan; M. S. Kannan
- Produced by: K. Vembu
- Starring: N. N. Kannappa; Pandari Bai; T. S. Balaiah; N. S. Krishnan; T. A. Mathuram
- Cinematography: K. Prabhakar
- Edited by: Pal G. Yadav
- Music by: S. V. Venkatraman
- Production company: Film Centre
- Release date: 31 August 1956
- Running time: 194 minutes
- Country: India
- Language: Tamil

Nannambikkai (transl. Good Hope) is a 1956 Indian Tamil-language film directed by K. Vembu and Charlie. The film stars N. S. Krishnan and T. A. Mathuram. It was released on 31 August 1956.

== Cast ==
List adapted from the database of Film News Anandan

Male cast

- N. S. Krishnan
- N. N. Kannappa
- T. S. Balaiah
- T. K. Balachandran

Female cast

- T. A. Mathuram
- Pandari Bai
- Mynavathi
- E. V. Saroja

== Production ==
The film was produced by K. Vembu who also directed the film together with Charlie. S. Ramanathan and M. S. Kannan wrote the screenplay and dialogues. K. Prabhakar was in charge of cinematography while Pal G. Yadav handled the editing. Art direction was by Jayavanth while choreography was done by R. K. Raj. Still photography was by Venkatachari and the film was shot and processed at Film Centre, Madras.

== Soundtrack ==
Music was composed by S. V. Venkatraman. A song by Kavimani Desigavinayagam Pillai was included in the film.

Song	Singer/s	Lyricist	Length
"Kaar Mugilin Maeni"	T. V. Rathnam	Kavimani Desigavinayagam Pillai	
"Anbe Aadhiye"	T. V. Rathnam	S. D. S. Yogi	
"Vaaraamal Irundhiduvaano"	S. V. Venkatraman & K. Rani	S. D. S. Yogi	
"Meenai Pole Kannale"	T. M. Soundararajan & P. Leela	Kavi Lakshmanadas	03:38
"Kopathai Adakkida Vendum"	T. A. Mathuram	Clown Sundaram	
"Thaali Pennukku Veli"	N. S. Krishnan	Clown Sundaram	02:35
"Sooriyanum Oru Thozhilaali"	S. V. Venkatraman	Kambadasan	03:24
"Kalyana Verlai Vandhu Kaathirukkudhu"	T. V. Rathnam	Adhimoolam	

== Reception ==
The Indian Express wrote, "Situations in the story are so marshalled as to preserve the concept of the poetic justice and such it is bound to fare well as an entertainer." Kanthan of Kalki appreciated Krishnan and Madhuram's comedy.
