= Ka. Mu. Sheriff =

- Born: Kadershah Ravuthar Mu. Sheriff; 11 August 1914; Abhivirutheeswaram, East Thanjavur, Tamilnadu
- Died: Before 1989
- Occupation: poet
- Children: Daughter Name : Apsha Nachiyar Grand Children Name : Shareefa Beevi, Mahmutha, Taj, Mariyam Beevi (Late), Bashariya,Allahpichai

Ka. Mu. Sheriff was a writer and poet who wrote mainly in the Tamil language. He was a popular Tamil film lyricist during the 1950s and 60s. His lyrics Chittukuruvi Chittukuruvi Sedhi Theriyuma?, Yerikaraiyin Maele Poravale Penn Mayile are ever-green in the minds of Tamil film song lovers. He also wrote screenplays and dialogue for some films.

== Early life ==
Born on 11 August 1914 at Abhivirutheeswaram in East Thanjavur district as the only son of Kadershah Ravuthar and Pathuma amma, he lived an exemplary life. A Muslim by birth, Sheriff respected other faiths and was a vegetarian throughout his life. He never smoked or drank.

He did not have a regular school education but was tutored privately in Tamil language till he was 14 years of age. Encouraged by his father, he learned Tamil grammar and literature. He started writing poetry when he was young.

== Career ==
He started writing short stories for Ananda Vikatan. (Later these short stories were published as a collection in book form). He published a monthly named "Oli" (transl. Light) in 1948 and between 1952 and 1969 he published two periodicals Saattai and Thamizh Muzhakkam.

== Freedom fighter ==
He was a follower of the Congress party freedom struggle and took part in the Quit India Movement in 1942. Later he joined Ma. Po. Si.'s Tamil Arasu Kazhagam and served as its secretary. He participated in the struggle mooted by Tamil Arasu Kazhagam to retain Madras as the capital of Tamil Nadu. He also participated in the Anti-Hindi agitations of Tamil Nadu.

== Writer ==
He wrote numerous books on various subjects in Tamil. (Lists of books he authored can be found in ta:கா. மு. ஷெரீப்).

== Lyricist ==
In the late 1940s, Sheriff was affiliated to the Modern Theatres in Salem. He was influential in introducing M. Karunanidhi to the Modern Theatres' owner T. R. Sundaram, who hired the young script writer for a monthly sum of 500 rupees, to join the story department of his company. In his autobiography, Karunanidhi had acknowledged this debt. Sheriff has penned more than 400 lyrics, many of which are popular and ever-green among Tamil film song lovers. His very first movie lyric was penned for the 1950 film Ponmudi, produced by the Modern Theatres.

== Music Directors ==
Music directors who composed tunes to his lyrics are: G. Ramanathan, S. M. Subbaiah Naidu, S. Dakshinamurthi, K. V. Mahadevan, Ramaneekaran, T. A. Kalyanam, T. R. Pappa, S. Rajeswara Rao

== Singers ==
Singers who sang his lyrics include T. M. Soundararajan, M. K. Thyagaraja Bhagavathar, Sirkazhi Govindarajan, A. M. Rajah, P. Leela, Jikki, K. Jamuna Rani, Soolamangalam Jayalakshmi, (Radha) Jayalakshmi, K. Rani, U. R. Chandra, Ponnammal, N. L. Ganasaraswathi, A. P. Komala,

== Notable compositions ==
Year	Film	Song/s	Singer/s	Music director	Notes
1950	Manthiri Kumari	உலவும் தென்றல் காற்றினிலே and others		G. Ramanathan	He is one of the lyricists along with A.Maruthakasi
1950	Digambara Samiyar			G. Ramanathan; S. M. Subbaiah Naidu	He is one of the lyricists. Individual credits not known
1950	Ponmudi			G. Ramanathan	He is one of the lyricists. Individual credits not known
1950	Chavukkadi Chandrakantha			G. Ramanathan	He is one of the lyricists. Individual credits not known
1951	Devaki			G. Ramanathan	He is one of the lyricists. Individual credits not known
1951	Sarvadhikari			S. Dakshinamurthi	He is one of the lyricists. Individual credits not known
1952	Amarakavi	Oru Pizhaiyum Seydhariyen ..eesa Man meethile	M. K. Thyagaraja Bhagavathar	G. Ramanathan; T. A. Kalyanam	
1952	Zamindar			G. Ramanathan	A. Maruthakasi also wrote lyrics. Individual credits not known
1953	Anbu	Enna Enna Inbame	A. M. Rajah & Jikki	T. R. Pappa	3 out of 12 songs were penned by him
1953	Inspector			G. Ramanathan	He is one of the lyricists. Individual credits not known
1953	Naalvar	Valluvanaar Seydha Thozhil	U. R. Chandra, Ponnammal & group	K. V. Mahadevan	
1953	Vazha Pirandhaval			G. Ramanathan; S. Rajeswara Rao	All 9 songs were penned by him
1954	Koondukkili	Vaanga Ellorume Koodi	T. M. Soundararajan & K. Rani	K. V. Mahadevan	
1954	Mangalyam	Vaazhvadhu Ponaalum	T. M. Soundararajan	K. V. Mahadevan	4 out of 7 songs were penned by him
1954	Pudhu Yugam	Jaadhiyile Naanga Thaazhndavanga	Jikki, N. L. Ganasaraswathi, A. P. Komala, A. G. Rathinamala	G. Ramanathan	He wrote the story also
1955	Asai Anna Arumai Thambi	Menakaiyum Naanuvaal	K. Rani	K. V. Mahadevan	
1955	Kalyanam Seydhukko	Engum Nirai Paramporul Onre	Sirkazhi Govindarajan	Ramaneekaran	
1955	Kalyanam Seydhukko	Vaetti Kattina Pombale	Sirkazhi Govindarajan & Soolamangalam Jayalakshmi		
1955	Mullaivanam	Engirundho ingu vandha radhiye	T. M. Soundararajan & (Radha) Jayalakshmi	K. V. Mahadevan	
1955	Mullaivanam	Sariyendru nee oru	T. M. Soundararajan & (Radha) Jayalakshmi	K. V. Mahadevan	
1955	Nalla Thangai	Ennai Pole Bhagyasaali	Jikki & P. Leela	G. Ramanathan	
1955	Nalla Thangai	Thaene Paage Thevittadha	(Radha) Jayalakshmi	G. Ramanathan	
1955	Town Bus	Chittukkuruvi Chittukkuruvi		K. V. Mahadevan	All songs
1956	Naan Petra Selvam			G. Ramanathan	All (9) songs
1957	Makkalai Petra Magarasi	O Malliyakka O Rojakka	Jikki, K. Jamuna Rani & A. G. Rathnamala	K. V. Mahadevan	
1957	Mudhalali	Yeri Karaiyin Mele	T. M. Soundararajan	K. V. Mahadevan	He wrote all the 7 songs
1958	Annaiyin Aanai	Patthu Maadham Sumandhu Annaiyai Pol Oru	T. M. Soundararajan	S. M. Subbaiah Naidu	
1960	Sivagami	Vanil Mulu mathiyai kanden	T. M. Soundararajan	K. V. Mahadevan	
1963	Thulasi Maadam	Aadum MAyile Aattam Enge	T. M. Soundararajan	K. V. Mahadevan	3 out of 5 songs were penned by him

== Death ==
Ka. Mu. Sheriff died before 1989.

== In popular culture ==
Sheriff is briefly portrayed by an uncredited actor in the film Periyar (2007).

== Bibliography ==
- "கவி கா.மு. ஷெரீப் நூற்றாண்டு" [Poet Ka. Mu. Sheriff Centenary] (in Tamil). tamil.thehindu.com. 12 September 2014.
- Kavi Ka. Mu. Sheriff
- Thiru. Veerapandian (1 September 2013). "Kaalam Isaikkum Kavithaikkup Peyar ka. mu. sheriff" [Ka. Mu. Sheriff is the name of the song rendered by Time]. nakkheeran.in.
