= Rambaiyin Kaadhal (1939 film) =

- Directed by: B. N. Rao
- Starring: K. Sarangapani, K. L. V. Vasantha, N. S. Krishnan, T. A. Mathuram
- Cinematography: Bodo Gutschwager
- Edited by: S. Surya
- Music by: Central Studios Orchestra
- Production company: Central Studios
- Distributed by: Sri Murugan Talkies
- Release date: 24 February 1939 (India)
- Running time: 2:57:46 (16,000 ft.)
- Country: India
- Language: Tamil

Rambaiyin Kaadhal (transl. Ramba's love) is a 1939 Indian, Tamil language Hindu mythological film directed by B. N. Rao. The film stars K. Sarangapani and K. L. V. Vasantha. The film has an alternate title Yathabhavishyan. Rambaiyin Kaadhal was remade in 1956 under the same title.

== Plot ==
The story is based on Hindu mythology. Ramba is a dancer in Indra's court. One day she descends to earth to see its beauty. She is enthralled by the riverside scenery in a country. She stays there for a long time and hence gets late for a dance performance in the court. Indra gets angry and curses her to become a statue near that river. Narada takes pity on Ramba and asks Indra to give a remedy. Indra agrees and says that Ramba can rejoin as court dance once she has suffered enough for her penance. In the meantime, an innocent young man, Yathabavishayan, who lives in a village near the river is fooled by his friends. They make him marry a donkey. After celebrations, they leave him. Yathabavishayan falls asleep. Narada arranges the statue (Ramba) to be placed near Yathabavishayan. When the young man gets up, he finds that he was sleeping at the foot of a statue of a woman. While he gets excited about it, the statue comes alive as a young woman. She falls in love with Yathabavishayan and takes him to heaven with her. One day, while in heaven, Yathabavishayan asks her to take him to Yama's Kingdom. He learns the secret of living without the fear of death. Yama finds now he has no work because people on earth has come to know the secret of staying alive. Yama makes inquiry and complaints to Indra that Ramba is responsible from bringing a human being to his (Yama's) Kingdom and taking him back to earth thus, revealing the secret of staying alive without death. Indra curses Ramba to become a ghost. Now Yathabavishayan could not see Ramba. He is mentally affected and wanders about. Ramba realiases that she cannot go back to Indra's court as dancer if she stays as a ghost. She asks Narada to advise her. He tells her a way out. As per that plan, she enters the body of Subashini, the princess of Kasi. The King, Kasi Rajan and his wife, Kasi Rani are baffled by the strange behaviour of the princess. They arrange for a witch doctor to cure her. During the witch doctor's rituals, the wandering Yathabavishayan gets there. Finding him, Ramba, within the body of the princess comes out and goes towards Yathabavishayan. Narada appears to her and advises her that she belongs to the heaven and therefore she should relinquish any love she has towards a human being. She accepts his advice. As she has relinquished her love for an earthly being her status is restored. She tells Yathabavishayan to marry Subashini, the princess. So, Yathabavishayan marries the princess and also inherits her father's Kingdom.

== Cast ==
Cast according to the opening credits of the film

Male cast

- K. Sarangapani as Yathabavishyan
- R. Balasubramanyam as Devendran
- K. A. Chokkalinga Bhagavathar as Naradar
- N. S. Krishnan as Amarasimman
- Professor S. S. Mallaiah as Yaman
- Krishna Sastri as Teacher
- V. S. Srinivasalu Naidu as King of Kasi
- K. S. Jayaraman as Subbani
- S. Krishnan as Seenu
- S. R. Sudalai as Venkittu
- Rangaraju as Rangan
- Thodi M. Kannan as Chitraguptan
- Kali N. Rathnam as Witch doctor (uncredited)
- T. S. Durairaj as Vinodha Kesari with N.S.Krishnan (uncredited)
- Nagarcoil K. Mahadevan as Sadhu (uncredited)

Female cast

- K. L. V. Vasantha Devi as Rambha
- T. A. Mathuram as Subhashini
- V. Subbulakshmi as Kamu
- Ponnammal as Visalakshi
- Indrani as Queen of Kasi
- T. S. Susheela as Menaka
- Seetha as Oorvasi
- Sarojini as Thilothama

== Production ==
The film was produced by Central Studios and was distributed by Sri Murugan Talkies. B. N. Rao directed the film. Cinematography was by Bodo Gutschwager and the audiography was done by Paul Juraschek. S. Surya was in charge of editing. Art direction was carried out by M. A. Gany. Processing was done at Central Studios by C. A. Sundararajulu, Raghavan Pillai and V. Parthasarathy

This is the first film that T. S. Durairaj featured in where he played Vinodha Kesari role as a friend and assistant to N.S. Krishnan.

== Soundtrack ==
The actors sang in their own voice. The Central Studios Orchestra provided the background music with S. M. Subbiah Naidu credited as harmonium player.

Orchestra

- K. S. Sivavadivel Pillai – Fiddle
- S. M. Subbaiah – Harmonium
- G. Sundaram – Tabla
- Ranganathan – Flute
- Narayanan – Veenai
- M. S. Saithumiyan - Sarangi

List of songs

Song	Singer/s	Duration (m:ss)
Vasudeva Sudhaa	Chokkalinga Bhagavather	02:30
Sethaapathe	Chokkalinga Bhagavather	01:51
Namo Mathava	Chokkalinga Bhagavather	02:04
Mundhi Mundhi	Kali N. Rathnam, T. S. Durairaj & T. A. Mathuram	04:52
Thendral Ulaavum	T. A. Mathuram	02:19
Iththanai Naalaai	N. S. Krishnan & T. A. Mathuram	02:58
Mana Mohananey	N. S. Krishnan & T. A. Mathuram	01:28
Chanthiran Udhayam	K. L. V. Vasantha	00:54
Sadha Subhakara Madhey	K. L. V. Vasantha	03:10
Panimalar Solai Alankaram	K. L. V. Vasantha	02:31
Pozhudhu Vidindhathu	Nagarcoil K. Mahadevan	03:05

== Reception ==
The film was a success at the box office.
