= Thukkaram =

- Main Characters in the film
- Directed by: B. N. Rao
- Based on: The life of Saint Tukaram
- Starring: Musiri Subramania Iyer; K. Sarangapani; R. Balasubramaniam; M. S. Murugesan; Chokkalinga Bhagavathar; K. Seetha; Meenambal; R. Balasaraswathi
- Production company: Central Studios
- Release date: 17 September 1938 (India)
- Country: India
- Language: Tamil

Thukkaram is a 1938 Indian Tamil-language biographical film directed by B. N. Rao and produced by Central Studios in Coimbatore. The film featured Carnatic vocalist Musiri Subramania Iyer as the eponymous saint.

== Plot ==
The film depicts the life story of the saint Tukaram.

== Cast ==
- Musiri Subramania Iyer as Tukaram
- K. Sarangapani
- R. Balasubramaniam
- M. S. Murugesan
- K. A. Chokkalinga Bhagavathar
- K. Seetha
- Meenambal
- R. Balasaraswathi as Tukaram's daughter

== Production ==
This is the only film that Musiri Subramania Iyer had any stint in the celluloid world. According to writer and critic Kalki Krishnamurthy, Tukaram wore a moustache whereas Subramania Iyer had a clean shaved face. When he was acting the part, he used a fake moustache. Subramania Iyer could not bear the itching caused by the gum that held the moustache in place. He told the producers to wait for sometime until he grew his own moustache. It was a scene of merriment to see him sporting a moustache because basically he was a Carnatic singer for whom in those days it was considered a taboo to wear a moustache. However, the moment the shooting was over, Subramania Iyer got a clean shave done.

R. Balasaraswathi who became a popular playback singer in later years, appeared as a child artiste, playing the role of Tukkaram's daughter. The film was produced also in Telugu with C. S. R. Anjaneyulu playing the title role.

== Soundtrack ==
Although no print of the film has survived, making it a lost film, some song discs of the film were still available as of January 2008.

== Reception ==
Thukkaram was a commercial success, prompting B. N. Rao to make more films with Central Studios.
