= Manasakshi =

- Poster
- Directed by: G. Viswanath
- Screenplay by: P. S. Nair
- Produced by: K. S. Akhileswarayyar
- Starring: Prem Nazir; Miss Kumari
- Cinematography: K. Gopal
- Edited by: G. Viswanath
- Music by: S. G. K. Pillai
- Production company: Central Studios
- Release date: 20 August 1954
- Country: India
- Language: Malayalam

Manasakshi is a 1954 Indian Malayalam-language film, directed by G. Viswanath and produced by K. S. Akhileswarayyar. The film stars Prem Nazir and Hemalatha in lead roles. The music score is by S. G. K. Pillai. It is the debut Malayalam film of Rajasulochana, singer T. R. Gajalakshmi, and S. G. K. Pillai, as composer.

== Cast ==
- Prem Nazir as Vijayan
- Hemalatha
- P. Bhaskaran
- Kottarakkara Sreedharan Nair
- Jose Prakash
- Pallom Joseph as Nanu Panicker
- Rajasulochana as Lakshmi Panicker, Nanu Panicker's daughter
- P. A. Thomas as Pachu Panicker, Nanu Panicker's brother and Sarala Panicker's father
- T. R. Omana as Sarala Panicker
- S. P. Pillai as Kuttan Pillai, owner of Kalalayam Arts Troupe
