= Ellam Unakkaga =

1961 film by Adurthi Subba Rao

- Theatrical release poster
- Directed by: Adurthi Subba Rao
- Story by: Atreya
- Starring: Sivaji Ganesan; Savitri
- Cinematography: P. Ramasamy
- Edited by: K. Govindasamy
- Music by: K. V. Mahadevan
- Production company: Saravanabhava Unity Pictures
- Release date: 1 July 1961
- Country: India
- Language: Tamil

Ellam Unakkaga (transl. All for you) is a 1961 Indian Tamil-language drama film directed by Adurthi Subba Rao from a story by Aatreya. The film stars Sivaji Ganesan and Savitri. It was released on 1 July 1961, and failed commercially.

== Plot ==
Anandan and Venkatachalam are friends. Venkatachalam's daughter Sarala, following an accident, loses her ability to walk. A doctor informs Venkatachalam that he treated a similarly handicapped woman, who in the process of giving birth to a child, was cured and could walk again. Inspired, Venkatachalam marries off Sarala to Anandan, deciding that if Sarala is not cured within two years, the marriage will be dissolved and Anandan can marry any other woman he wants. Anandan and Sarala live a happily married life. Sarala gives birth to a child, but is not cured of her handicap. However, Anandan refuses to abandon hope. The rest of the film revolves around what happens to the many problems of the characters.

== Cast ==
- Sivaji Ganesan as Anandan
- Savitri as Sarala
- S. V. Ranga Rao as Venkadachalam Pillai
- T. S. Balaiah as Egambaram
- C. K. Saraswathi as Chellam
- S. A. Natarajan as Nagu
- T. R. Ramachandran as Sigamani
- V. Nagayya as Dr. Moorthy
- M. S. Sundari Bai as Venkadachalam Pillai's Mother
- P.Susila as Bhama
- Sasikala as Mallika

== Production ==
Ellam Unakkaga was directed by Adurthi Subba Rao from a story by Aatreya. The film was produced by Saravanabhava Unity Pictures, filmed by P. Ramasamy and edited by K. Govindasamy. Shooting took place at the Adyar-based Neptune Studios, later known as Sathya Studios.

== Soundtrack ==
The music was composed by K. V. Mahadevan, assisted by Pugazhendi.

Song	Singer/s	Lyricist
"Eru Katchikku"	A. L. Raghavan, L. R. Eswari group	Thanjai N. Ramaiah Dass
"Manasu Pola Mapillai"	P. Susheela, Soolamangalam Rajalakshmi, L. R. Eswari group	Kothamangalam Subbu
"Veesiya Puyalennum"	P. Susheela	A. Maruthakasi
"Malarum Kodiyum Pennenbar"	T. M. Soundararajan, P. Susheela	Kannadasan
"Kannale Kadhal Kaditham"	A. L. Raghavan, L. R. Eswari	Ku. Ma. Krishnan
"Thanga Magane Inbam Thandha"	P. Susheela, L. R. Eswari group	Kannadasan
"Konji Varum Nenjil Indru"	P. Susheela	Kannadasan
"Kadamaiyai Seivom"	T. M. Soundararajan group	Kannadasan

== Release and reception ==
Ellam Unakkaga was released on 1 July 1961. Kanthan of Kalki said the film could be seen once for Savitri. According to historian Randor Guy, the film was not a commercial success as viewers could not accept seeing Ganesan and Savitri as lovers onscreen, the duo having acted as siblings in Pasamalar earlier that year.
