= Kokilavani =

- Poster of the Tamil version
- Directed by: S. A. Natarajan
- Screenplay by: S. D. Sundharam
- Produced by: S. A. Natarajan; Vijayam
- Starring: S. A. Natarajan; Tambaram Lalitha; Raghuveer
- Cinematography: J. G. Vijayam
- Music by: G. Ramanathan
- Production company: Forward Art Films
- Release date: 30 March 1956
- Running time: 174 minutes
- Country: India
- Languages: Tamil; Kannada

Kokilavani (transl. Singing (Indian) Cuckoo) is a 1956 Indian film directed by S. A. Natarajan. The film stars Raghuveer and Tambaram Lalitha. It was produced in Tamil and Kannada languages. The Tamil version was released on 30 March 1956.

== Cast ==
The list is adapted from the database of Film News Anandan and from Thiraikalangiyam.

Male cast

- S. A. Natarajan
- Raghuveer (debut)
- K. M. Balakrishnan
- K. Sarangapani
- S. V. Subbaiah
- V. M. Ezhumalai
- Kaka Radhakrishnan

Female cast

- Tambaram Lalitha
- B. Saroja Devi
- P. Susheela
- A. Sakunthala
- R. Bharathi

== Production ==
The film was produced by S. A. Natarajan and J. G. Vijayam who also handled the cinematography. Choreography was done by P. S. Gopalakrishnan. The film was produced in Kannada with the same title.

== Soundtrack ==
Music was composed by G. Ramanathan. A Thiruvarutpa by Ramalinga Swamigal was included in the film.

Song	Singer/s	Lyricist	Duration (m:ss)
"Kambiyile Vaasikiren"	Baby Saroja, Devaki, Moorthi, P. S. Thangamani, Elangovan, S. R. Ramadas	T. K. Sundara Vathiyar	03:06
"Oonuyirgal Ullamellaam"	S. C. Krishnan	T. K. Sundara Vathiyar	
"Jilu Jilu Mittaai Paarungo"	S. C. Krishnan	Lakshmanadas	02:19
"Ammaiyappa Unnai"	T. M. Soundararajan	Lakshmanadas	02:35
"Thaditha Or Maganai Thandhai"	T. M. Soundararajan	Ramalinga Swamigal	00:53
"Vanjanaiyariyaa Vaanambaadi"	D. B. Ramachandran & T. R. Gajalakshmi	S. D. Sundharam	04:38
"Sarasa Mohana Sangeedhaamrudha"	Sirkazhi Govindarajan	S. D. Sundharam	04:12
"Anboli Veesi"	Sirkazhi Govindarajan	S. D. Sundharam	03:17
"Azhagodaiyil Neendhum Annam"	Sirkazhi Govindarajan & Jikki	S. D. Sundharam	04:43
"Thiruve En Deviye"	Sirkazhi Govindarajan & Jikki	A. Maruthakasi	
"Ulagam Pugazhum Ezhil Raani"	Jikki & group	A. Maruthakasi	05:28
"Maalaiyile Manasaanthi"	Sirkazhi Govindarajan	A. Maruthakasi	02:34
