= Pudhu Yugam (1954 film) =

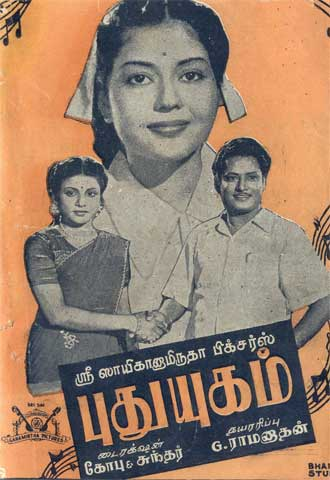
- Directed by: Gopu, Sundar
- Written by: Ka. Mu. Sheriff
- Produced by: G. Ramanathan
- Starring: S. A. Natarajan; P. V. Narasimha Bharathi; Krishna Kumari; M. S. Draupadi; S. V. Subbaiah; M. Saroja
- Cinematography: M. R. Purushothaman
- Edited by: D. R. Gopu
- Music by: G. Ramanathan
- Production company: Sri Sai Ghaanamrudha Pictures
- Release date: 4 June 1954
- Running time: 3 hrs. 7 mins
- Country: India
- Language: Tamil

Pudhu Yugam (transl. New Era) is a 1954 Indian Tamil-language drama film directed by Gopu and Sundar. The film stars S. A. Natarajan, P. V. Narasimha Bharathi, Krishna Kumari and M. S. Draupadi. It was released on 4 June 1954.

== Plot ==
Professor Raghunath is a social reformer. His younger sister Chellam is a widow. Raghunath plans to remarry her to his student Sekar. Sekar and Chellam's relationship becomes intimate and Chellam becomes pregnant before marriage. Raghunath does not know this. He mortgages his house and helps Sekar to establish a business. Sekar becomes rich and makes arrangements to marry a rich girl, Chitra. Chellam pleads with Sekar but he refuses to marry her. Raghunath also talks to Sekar but Sekar is adamant in his decision. Raghunath learns of Chellam's pregnancy and kills himself due to the disgrace. The house is confiscated and Chellam leaves with Raghunath's son Vinodhan. They are looked after by Murugan and Valli who live in the poor quarter. Chellam gives birth to a girl child and she names her Pushpa. She leaves Pushpa with Murugan and Valli and goes away in search of a job. She gets a job as a baby-sitter to Raja, the grandson of a rich old man. She brings up both Vinodhan and Raja who grows up and become a doctor and Police Inspector respectively. Pushpa becomes a nurse. In the meantime, Sekar marries Chitra and begets a girl child, Whether Chellam takes revenge on Sekar, and what happens to the children all form the rest of the story.

== Cast ==
Cast from the song book.

Male cast

- S. A. Natarajan
- Narasimha Bharathi
- S. V. Subbaiah
- C. S. Pandian
- M. S. Muthukrishnan
- Sai Ram
- Bhairavan
- C. V. V. Panthulu
- Samikannu
- Govindan
- Gopal
- Krishna Rao

Female cast

- M. S. Draupadi
- Krishnakumari
- M. Saroja
- Vimala
- Rajamani
- Rathnam

== Soundtrack ==
Music was composed by G. Ramanathan.

Song	Singer/s	Lyricist	Length
"Paramparai Panakkaaran Pole.... Paisavum Naasthithaan"	T. M. Soundararajan, S. C. Krishnan & V. T. Rajagopalan	Thanjai N. Ramaiah Dass	03:32
"Jaadhiyile Naanga Thaazhndhavanga"	Jikki, N. L. Ganasaraswathi, A. P. Komala, A. G. Rathnamala & V. T. Rajagopalan	Ka. Mu. Sheriff	03:19
"Kalaiye Puviyaarai Kavarum"	M. L. Vasanthakumari	A. Maruthakasi	03:06
"Kangal Rendum Pesudhe"	A. P. Komala	A. Maruthakasi	
"Thavare Purindhu Pinnaal"	Jikki	A. Maruthakasi	03:29
"Pudhu Yugam, Pudhu Yugam"	Jikki & P. Leela	A. Maruthakasi	
"Naisaana Duty"	T. S. Bhagavathi	A. Maruthakasi	
"Penn Madhiyale Mun Madhiyinri"	T. S. Bhagavathi	A. Maruthakasi	03:20
"Kaadhal Kondu Poovil Vandu"	Ghantasala & P. Leela	A. Maruthakasi	
"Kalyanam Aagum Munne"	Ghantasala & Jikki	A. Maruthakasi	03:18
"Vaazhvinile Inba Saubhagyam"	P. Leela	A. Maruthakasi	
