= N. N. Kannappa =

N. N. Kannappa in Devaki (1951 film)

N. N. Kannappa was an Indian stage and film artiste. He worked mainly in Tamil plays and films. He had his own troupe Navasakthi that staged several plays.

N. N. Kannappa featured in the following Tamil language films.

1. Devaki (1951) - 1st film. Featured in the lead role with V. N. Janaki
2. Manidhanum Mirugamum (1953)
3. Naalvar (1953)
4. Town Bus (1955) - paired with Anjali Devi
5. Nannambikkai (1956)
6. Paditha Penn (1956)
7. Mala Oru Mangala Vilakku (1959)
8. Paththarai Maathu Thangam (1959)
9. Thamarai Kulam (1959)
10. Thanthaikku Pin Thamaiyan (1960)
11. Kappalottiya Thamizhan (1961) - as brother of Va. U. Si.
12. Deivathin Deivam (1962)
13. Ninaipadharku Neramillai (1963) - as Police Inspector in Guest role

== Award ==
Tamil Nadu State government conferred the 1965-66 Kalaimamani award on him for best stage artiste.
