= Pakshiraja Films =

Pakshiraja Films was an Indian Movie production company based in Coimbatore, Tamil Nadu, India. It was owned and operated by film director S. M. Sriramulu Naidu. From 1937 to 1945 the company released movies from Central Studios, but later from 1945 the company had its own Movie studio under the name Pakshiraja Studios.

== See also ==
- Central Studios
- Pakshiraja Studios
