= Zamindar (1952 film) =

- Theatrical release poster
- Directed by: P. V. Krishnan
- Written by: Pa. Kannan
- Starring: S. A. Nataraj; Madhuri Devi
- Cinematography: J. G. Vijayam
- Edited by: T. Vijayarangam
- Music by: G. Ramanathan
- Production companies: Jupiter Pictures; Sangeetha Pictures
- Release date: 30 August 1952
- Country: India
- Language: Tamil

Zamindar is a 1952 Indian Tamil-language film directed by P. V. Krishnan and written by Jalakantapuram. The film was jointly produced by Jupiter Pictures and Sangeetha Pictures. It stars S. A. Nataraj and Madhuri Devi. The film was released on 30 August 1952, and was commercially unsuccessful.

== Plot ==
Allikulam is a small zamindar administered by the regent Pandi Thevar, who has plans to usurp it with the sudden and shocking death of the zamindar. His villainous brother also plans to usurp the property. The regent and the brother are at loggerheads with one trying to outdo the other. Manmudi, a struggling farmer, is a man of discipline, even though he has a rough exterior. His sister Meenakshi is a good looking young woman. The villain plans to kidnap her. Indulging in murders and such crimes, more complications are woven into the story to create more interesting situations.

== Cast ==
Male cast

- S. A. Nataraj
- D. Balasubramaniam
- T. N. Sivathanu
- V. M. Ezhumalai
- S. S. Sivasooriyan
- S. M. Thirupathisami
- C. R. Nataraj
- R. Dhamodharam
- A. S. Gunapal
- O. A. K. Thevar
- M. A. Ganapathi
- V. T. Rajagopal

Male cast (continued)

- G. Muthukrishnan
- M. R. Santhanam
- M. S. Govindan
- K. P. Ramaiah
- T. B. Harihara Bhagavathar
- M. N. Krishnan
- M. M. A. Chinnappa
- S. S. Kathiresan
- V. Sivaramakrishnan
- S. Ramakrishnan
- J. D. Das
- A. Natesan

Female cast

- Madhuri Devi as Meenakshi
- M. M. Radha Bai
- T. P. Muthulakshmi
- R. Lakshmi Devi
- K. Rathnam
- P. Padmavathi
- M. V. Rajamma as Allikulam
- Pushpammal
- Rita as Gypsy Dancer
- Manickam
- Ranganayaki
- Meera

== Soundtrack ==
The music was composed by G. Ramanathan.

Songs	Singers	Lyrics
"Engume Suthuvom Ishtam Pole"	Jikki	A. Maruthakasi
"Maalai Pozhuthinile"	Jikki	A. Maruthakasi
"Madhuvai Parugum Vanduu"	Radha Jayalakshmi	Ka. Mu. Sheriff
"Nallavargal Vazhvile"	V. T. Rajagopalan	Ka. Mu. Sheriff
"Enakkum Unakkum Isaintha"	T. V. Rathnam	Ka. Mu. Sheriff
"Thunbam Menmelum Soozhnthaal"	A. M. Rajah & P. Leela	Ka. Mu. Sheriff
"Oh..Lucky Tikki"	Jikki	Ka. Mu. Sheriff
"Enni Enni Ullam Yenginen"	Jikki	A. Maruthakasi
"Vaanil Nilavum Ulavuthe"	A. M. Rajah & Jikki	A. Maruthakasi
"Vanavil Pole Manthargal"	G. Ramanaathan	A. Maruthakasi
