= Chokkalinga Bhagavathar =

Indian stage and film actor

- Born: 1907
- Died: 21 January 2002 (aged 95); Kumbakonam,Tamil Nadu.
- Occupation: Actor
- Awards: Kalaimamani Award (1999)

Chokkalinga Bhagavathar, also known as K. A. Chokkalinga Bhagavathar or M. A. Chokkalinga Bhagavathar (1907 - 21 January 2002) was an Indian stage and film artiste who acted mostly in Tamil language films. Though he began his film career in 1938, he acted only in two films Thukkaram and Rambaiyin Kaadhal in 1938 and 1939 respectively. After a lapse of almost 50 years he was brought back to film by Balu Mahendra for his film Veedu in 1988. Since then he appeared in about 10 films during the following decade. He acted in an Italian film Branchie also in 1999.

== Filmography ==
1. Thukkaram (1938)
2. Rambaiyin Kaadhal (1939)
3. Dhaanasoora Karna (1940)
4. Veedu (1988)
5. Sandhya Raagam (1989)
6. Thaiyalkaran (1991)
7. Therku Theru Machan (1992)
8. Thalattu Ketkuthamma (1992)
9. Gentleman (1993)
10. Uzhaippali (1993)
11. Amma Ponnu (1993)
12. Jai Hind (1994)
13. Sathi Leelavathi (1995)
14. Indian (1996)
15. Aur Ek Prem Kahani (Hindi) (1996)
16. Raman Abdullah (1997)
17. Periya Idathu Mappillai (1997)
18. Velai (1998)
19. Branchie (Italian) (1999)

== Awards ==
- Kalaimamani Award - 1999
