= Ellis R. Dungan =

American director of Indian films (1909–2001)

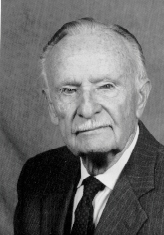
- Born: Ellis Roderick Dungan; May 11, 1909; Barton, Ohio, U.S.
- Died: December 1, 2001 (aged 92); Wheeling, West Virginia, U.S.
- Occupation: Film director
- Years active: 1935–87
- Spouse: Elaine Dungan

Ellis Roderick Dungan (May 11, 1909 – December 1, 2001) was an American film director, who was well known for working in Indian films, predominantly in Tamil cinema, from 1936 to 1950. He was an alumnus of the University of Southern California and moved to India in 1935. During his film career in South India, Dungan directed the debut films of several popular Tamil film actors, such as M. G. Ramachandran, T. S. Balaiah, and K. A. Thangavelu in Sathi Leelavathi (1936).

== Biography ==
=== Early life ===
An Irish-American, Dungan was born in Barton, Ohio. on May 11, 1909. He attended St. Clairsville High School in St. Clairsville, where he played quarterback on the school football team. He bought his first box camera to take pictures for the school yearbook, for which he was editor-in-chief. He later enrolled at the University of Southern California in 1932 in the newly established Cinematography & Motion Picture Production Department.

=== Career ===
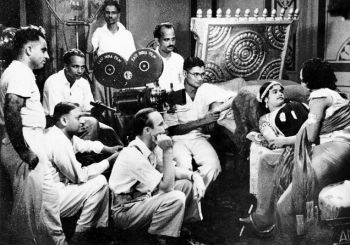
Ellis R. Dungan directing M. K. Thyagaraja Bhagavathar and M. R. Santhanalakshmi in Ambikapathy (1937)

In 1935, he arrived in British India with his college mate Michael Ormalev at the invitation of another USC student – Manik Lal Tandon of Bombay. Tandon's family was then planning to enter the film industry. When those plans did not take off, Tandon invited them to Calcutta where he was directing the Tamil film Nandanar. There Tandon introduced them to A. N. Marudhachalam Chettiar, a film producer who was making the film Sathi Leelavathi and recommended Dungan be hired to direct the film as he himself was busy directing Nandanar. Thus Dungan made his directing debut with Sathi Leelavathi which was also the first film of the future Chief Minister of Tamil Nadu, M. G. Ramachandran. During 1936–50, Dungan made a number of Tamil films and one Hindi film – Meera (1947). Dungan had no knowledge of Indian languages, a problem which never affected his career as a director of films in Indian languages, especially Tamil. He introduced many new techniques to Indian cinema despite the technical limitations of that period. Many of his movies were based on the mythical characters of the Hindu religion and he had to shoot them in Hindu temples where non-Hindus were not allowed in those days. Dungan filmed his movies in the temples by passing himself off as a Kashmiri pandit. Dungan is credited with introducing modern make-up, the mobile camera and cabaret dance numbers to Tamil Cinema and moving it away from the influence of stage plays. For his introduction of intimate love scenes in Ponmudi (1950), Dungan was criticized by the press for introducing "vulgar" scenes and for "corrupting the population with American ways".

His last Tamil film was Manthiri Kumari in 1950. He returned to America and settled in Wheeling, West Virginia, in 1958. There he started his company – Ellis Dungan Productions and for the next thirty years made documentary movies.

=== Death ===
Dungan died in Wheeling on December 1, 2001, at the age of 92.

== Legacy ==
Dungan is credited with having revolutionized Indian cinema and introduced western innovations. In 2013, Indian film maker Karan Bali made a one-hour documentary on Dungan titled An American in Madras by consulting West Virginia State Archives and interviewing people who had known Dungan.

== Filmography ==
Year	Film	Credited as			Notes
Year	Film	Director	Producer	Cinematographer/Editor	Notes
1935	Bhakta Nandanar	Yes	No	No	Uncredited
1936	Sathi Leelavathi	Yes	No	Editor	
1936	Seemanthini	Yes	No	No	
1936	Iru Sahodarargal	Yes	No	No	
1937	Ambikapathy	Yes	No	Editor	
1940	Sakuntalai	Yes	No	Editor	
1940	Kalamegam	Yes	No	No	
1941	Surya Puthri	Yes	No	No	
1943	Daasi Penn	Yes	No	No	
1945	Valmiki	Yes	No	No	
1945	Returning Soldier	Yes	No	No	Short film starring T. S. Balaiah
1945	Meera	Yes	No	No	Partially reshot in Hindi (1947)
1950	Ponmudi	Yes	No	No	
1950	Manthiri Kumari	Yes	No	No	
1952	The Jungle	No	Associate	No	
1958	Harry Black and the Tiger	No	No	No	Technical advisor
1959	Wheels to Progress	No	Yes	Cinematographer	
1959	The Big Hunt	No	Co-producer	Cinematographer	Also actor
1962	Tarzan Goes to India	No	Second unit	No	
1965	A Work of Heart and Hand	No	Yes	No	
1966	Spring Comes to Vintroux	Yes	No	Cinematographer	
1963	West Virginia Land for Relaxation	No	Yes	No	
1969	High Speed Steel	No	Yes	No	
1970	Pathways to Understanding	No	Yes	No	
1971	Wild, Wonderful, West Virginia	No	Yes	No	
1972	Protecting the Ballot	No	No	Yes	
1972	Portrait of a University	No	No	Cinematographer	
1977	For Liberty and Union	No	Yes	No	
1977	A Ride of the Future	Yes	Yes	No	
1985	Pocahontas: A Family Portrait	No	Yes	No	
1987	Josiah Fox – Architect of the United States First Navy	Yes	Yes	No	

=== Television ===
Year	Title	Producer	Cinematographer	Notes
1951–1954	Smilin' Ed's Gang	No	Yes	
1955–1960	Andy's Gang	Yes	No	1 episode

== Bibliography ==
- A Guide to Adventure – An Autobiography (with Barbara Diane Smik), Pittsburg: Dorrance Publishing Co. (2002)
