= Marmayogi =

1951 film by K. Ramnoth

- Theatrical release poster
- Directed by: K. Ramnoth
- Screenplay by: A. S. A. Sami
- Produced by: M. Somasundaram
- Starring: M. G. Ramachandran; Anjali Devi; Madhuri Devi
- Cinematography: M. Masthan; W. R. Subba Rao
- Edited by: M. A. Thirumugam
- Music by: C. R. Subbaraman; S. M. Subbaiah Naidu
- Production company: Jupiter Pictures
- Release date: 2 February 1951
- Running time: 175 minutes
- Country: India
- Languages: Tamil; Hindi

Marmayogi (transl. The Mysterious Sage) is a 1951 Indian Tamil-language swashbuckler film directed by K. Ramnoth and produced by M. Somasundaram. An adaptation of the novel Vengeance by Marie Corelli and William Shakespeare's play Macbeth, the film was shot simultaneously in Hindi as Ek Tha Raja (transl. Once There Was A King). It stars M. G. Ramachandran, Anjali Devi and Madhuri Devi, with S. V. Sahasranamam, Serukalathur Sama (playing the title role), N. Seetharaman, S. A. Natarajan, M. N. Nambiar and M. Pandari Bai in supporting roles.

Development of the film began after the success of Rajakumari (1947), when Ramachandran approached writer A. S. A. Sami to write a script which revolves around him. Sami wrote a script inspired by Vengeance, Macbeth, and Robin Hood. S. M. Subbaiah Naidu and C. R. Subbaraman composed all the songs in the soundtrack album. M. Masthan and W. R. Subbarao handled the film's cinematography. The film was edited by M. A. Thirumugam.

Marmayogi was released on 2 February 1951. It became a commercial success and established Ramachandran's image as a star. It was the first Tamil film to receive an A certificate (adults only) from the Central Board of Film Certification.

== Plot ==
Urvasi, is the young mistress of a king. With the help of her own lover, she pushes the king off a boat and usurps his powers. Urvasi appoints herself as the new queen regnant, and the kingdom experiences a reign of terror. The palace where the two princes of the kingdom live is burnt. The queen assumes all powers and kills all potential opponents, including her lover. A sage comes to the kingdom with his son and a girl, and joins the queen as her adviser. Years roll by. The sage's son Veerangan is appointed Army Commander. At the same time, in the countryside, Karikalan functions as de facto leader of the people, helps them in various ways and fights the queen's misrule. When he becomes a big threat to the queen, she orders his capture. Veerangan sends Kala, the girl raised by the sage as a spy, to Karikalan, but she falls in love with him.

Karikalan gets periodic instructions from the Goddess on what needs to be done and he follows the same. The queen gets scared by a ghost which appears regularly and warns her of the impending punishment she deserves for her misdeeds. Kala and Karikalan's followers are captured by the army. Karikalan personally leads their rescue mission. In prison, he gets instructions from the goddess to capture the queen also. He rescues his people, captures the queen and brings her to his hideout. When the ghost appears there, she confesses her crime of killing the king. When she is about to be executed, Veerangan's army enters and captures everyone. Veerangan also finds out that the sage (also called Marmayogi) is his father, and he has been giving information to Karikalan secretly. Hence he also gets arrested for being a traitor.

The queen returns to her throne and orders the execution of the sage, Karikalan and others. When Karikalan is about to be killed, the sage reveals the truth about the king and informs Veerangan that Karikalan is his elder brother. When Veerangan demands to know where the king is, the sage removes his disguise. To the surprise of everyone, he reveals that he is the deposed king and narrates what happened. Though the queen and her lover attempted to kill him, he escaped under the water using his yogic skills, taking his sons and the army commander's daughter Kala with him. He returned to his kingdom in the disguise of a sage with his younger son Veeranganan and Kala and left Karikalan in the forest. Shocked to see the dead king return, the queen dies. The king announce that his children Karikalan and Veerangan are now the rulers.

== Cast ==
Male

- M. G. Ramachandar as Karikalan
- S. V. Sahasranamam as Veerangan
- Serukalathur Sama as King Marmayogi
- N. Seetharaman as Purushothaman
- S. A. Natarajan as Paisachi
- M. N. Nambiar as Nallathambi
- L. R. Mudaliar as Bhagavathi

Female

- Anjali Devi as Urvasi
- Madhuri Devi as Kalavathi
- M. Pandari Bai as Vasantha
- M. S. S. Bhagyam as Nallamma

== Production ==
After the success of Rajakumari (1947), M. G. Ramachandran approached writer A. S. A. Sami to write a script which would revolve around him. Samy wrote a script inspired by Vengeance by Marie Corelli, Shakespeare's theatrical play Macbeth and Robin Hood. Makers initially considered naming the film Karikalan but later changed it to Marmayogi to avoid it being confused with a historical film. Ramachandran's last name was credited as "Ramachandar". P. Bhanumathi was originally signed for the role of villainous Urvasi, but later she was replaced by Anjali Devi. Serukulathur Sama, Sahasranamam and S. A. Natarajan were selected to portray supporting roles. M. N. Nambiar portrayed a positive character of Ramachandran's assistant. M. Masthan and W. R. Subbarao handled the film's cinematography. The film was edited by M. A. Thirumugam.

Ramachandran's sword fight sequence with Sahasranamam was shot outdoors with Ramachandran practising for the scene for three to four days and refused to use a body double. Director Ramnath changed the climax from the original screenplay. After the film was completed, many felt that ending was not convincing and Ramnath reshot the climax which was accepted by audience.

== Themes and influences ==
The film's plot was inspired by Vengeance by Marie Corelli and Shakespeare's play Macbeth. The film drew inspiration from the Russian film Ivan The Terrible (1945) and the scene where Karikalan enters the courtroom was inspired by the film Adventures of Robin Hood (1938). The scene where Ramachandran fights with a sword with Sahasranamam by riding a horse is inspired from The Black Arrow: A Tale of the Two Roses.

== Soundtrack ==
The music was composed by S. M. Subbaiah Naidu and C. R. Subburaman.

Song title	Singers	Lyrics	Duration
"Azhagaana Penn Maanai Paar"	Jikki		03:03
"Dhesam Pora Pokka Paartthaa"			
"Ah... Inbam Iravil Amaidhiyile"	T. V. Rathnam	K. D. Santhanam	03:23
"Kannin Karumaniye Kalaavathi"	Thiruchi Loganathan & K. V. Janaki	Kannadasan	02:05
"Vetri Sangai Oodhuvom"			02:00
"Manathukisaindha Raajaa"	T. V. Rathnam		02:52
"Kazhuthailiye Irandu Vitham"	K. R. Chellamuthu & A. V. Saraswathi		04:03
"Thillalangadi Thillalangadi"			01:15
"Vandha Vazhi Marandhene"	K. V. Janaki	Kannadasan	02:34
"Pesa Kooda Nalla Illae"			

== Release ==
Marmayogi was released on 2 February 1951, delayed from 14 January. The film was given an A certificate (adults only) by the censor board because it featured a ghost (King's character posing as one), making it the first Tamil film to receive this rating.

== Other versions ==
Marmayogi was simultaneously made in Hindi as Ek Tha Raja in 1951 with the same cast. Jupiter Pictures remade the film in Telugu with the same name in 1964.

== Legacy ==
The film's commercial success established Ramachandran's image as a star. His dialogue "Naan kuri vaithaal thavara maatten! Thavarumey aanaal kuri vaikka maatten" (I will not miss if I aim! I will not aim if I were to miss) became popular.

== Bibliography ==
- Dhananjayan, G. (2014). Pride of Tamil Cinema: 1931–2013. Blue Ocean Publishers. OCLC 898765509.
- Guy, Randor (2016). Gopal, T. S. (ed.). Memories of Madras: Its Movies, Musicians & Men of Letters. Chennai: Creative Workshop. ISBN 978-81-928961-7-5.
