= Kaithi (1951 film) =

1951 film by S. Balachander

- Theatrical release poster
- Directed by: S. Balachander
- Screenplay by: S. Balachander
- Story by: S. Balachander
- Based on: Dark Passage
- Produced by: M. Somasundaram
- Starring: S. Balachander; S. A. Natarajan; S. Revathi; V. Meenakshi
- Cinematography: B. Ramasamy
- Edited by: M. A. Thirumugam
- Music by: S. Balachander
- Production company: Jupiter Pictures
- Release date: 23 December 1951
- Running time: 172 minutes
- Country: India
- Language: Tamil

Kaithi (transl. Prisoner) is a 1951 Indian Tamil-language crime thriller film written and directed by S. Balachander for Jupiter Pictures. Balachandar also composed the music, and stars alongside S. A. Natarajan, S. Revathi and V. Meenakshi. Adapted from the American film Dark Passage (1947), it revolves around a man being wrongfully convicted, and escaping to clear his name. Kaithi was released on 23 December 1951, and was a commercial success. No print of the film is known to survive, making it a lost film.

== Plot ==
Karunakaran, a generous man, meets Vijayan, a poor unemployed graduate, at the Guindy Race Course and guides him to bet on a particular horse to help him make money. The bet proves a success, but Vijayan finds Karunakaran killed when attempting to give him the winnings and is framed for the murder. The plot follows his escape from prison and search for the killer, Vijaya Sarathi.

== Cast ==
Male cast

- S. Balachander as Vijayan
- S. A. Natarajan as Vijaya Sarathi
- G. M. Basheer as Prosecutor Raman
- M. K. Mustafa as Inspector Kesavan
- G. Muthukrishnan as Sekar
- M. R. Santhanam as Karunakaran
- A. Ganesan as Pandu
- T. M. Gopal as Arumugam
- K. N. Venkatramanan as a public prosecutor
- S. Peer Mohamed as a public prosecutor
- S. V. Rajagopal as the bandyman
- Pinni Raju as the judge

Male supporting cast

- Master Shivaraman, Krishnan, Prabhakaran

Female cast

- S. Revathi as Kamala
- V. Meenakshi as Revathi
- R. Malathi as Jayam
- S. Saroja as Seethamma

== Production ==
The producer M. Somasundaram of Jupiter Pictures approached S. Balachander to make a film for his banner. Balachander developed a story based on the American film Dark Passage (1947) involving a wrongfully convicted man escaping from prison to clear his name. While he also wrote the screenplay, the dialogues were written by T. S. Venkatasamy, Kalaimani and N. Seetharaman. Cinematography was handled by B. Ramasamy, and editing by M. A. Thirumugam, then the staff editor of Jupiter. Initially, the film was announced with the title Raktham (Blood), and various Tamil publicity posters had the caption Velivarugirathu! Jupiterin Raktham! (Coming! Jupiter's Blood!) in bold and all caps. This shocked Balachander, Somasundaram and Jupiter co-founder S. K. Mohideen, so the title was changed to Kaithi, suggested by Balachander.

== Soundtrack ==
Music was composed by S. Balachander and lyrics written by K. D. Santhanam. The song "Aiya Horee Ram" was adapted from the "Canoe Song" sung by Paul Robeson in Sanders of the River (1935). A song beginning with the English lines, "Be happy... Be jolly... Be cheerful...", was also popular.

Songs	Singer
"Kodumai Piranthu Valarumittam"	Chorus
"Pozhuthu Vidiya"	S. V. Rajagopal
"Be Happy Be Jolly Be Cheerful"	Jayalakshmi
"Arivu Peruka Aaanum Pennum"	Chorus
"Minnalai Pole En Kadhal"	Jikki
"Pethai Penn Mathiyame"	Jikki
"Inba Kanavam Vaiyagame"	
"Aiya Horee Ram"	
"Manathinil Kadhal"	

== Release ==
Kaithi was released on 23 December 1951. The film emerged a commercial success at a time when crime thrillers were not common in Tamil cinema. However, no print of it is known to survive, making it a lost film.
