= Kanniyin Kathali =

1949 film by K. Ramnoth

- Theatrical release poster
- Directed by: K. Ramnoth
- Screenplay by: K. Ramnoth
- Based on: Twelfth Night by William Shakespeare
- Produced by: K. Ramnoth; A. K. Sekhar
- Starring: Madhuri Devi; Anjali Devi; S. A. Natarajan
- Cinematography: W. R. Subba Rao
- Edited by: T. Durairaj
- Music by: S. M. Subbaiah Naidu; C. R. Subbaraman
- Production company: Jupiter Pictures
- Release date: 6 August 1949
- Country: India
- Language: Tamil

Kanniyin Kathali (transl. The Maiden's Lover) is a 1949 Indian Tamil-language romantic comedy film directed by K. Ramnoth, who produced it with A. K. Sekhar and wrote the screenplay. An adaptation of the play Twelfth Night by William Shakespeare, it stars Madhuri Devi, Anjali Devi and S. A. Natarajan. The film revolves around the twins Adithan and Chandrika, who are separated in a shipwreck. Chandrika (who is disguised as a man) falls in love with Prince Vasanthakumar, who in turn is in love with Megala Devi. Upon meeting Chandrika, Megala falls in love with her, thinking she is a man. Kanniyin Kathali was released on 6 August 1949.

== Plot ==
Prince Adithan and his twin sister Princess Chandrika are separated in a shipwreck. Chandrika is shipwrecked on the coast of the Vasanthapuri Kingdom and she comes ashore with the help of a fisherman. She loses contact with Adithan, whom she believes had drowned. Disguising herself as a young man under the name "Kalaimani", she enters the service of Prince Vasanthakumar's palace, who posed at the Royal Poetry Position.

Vasanthakumar has convinced himself that he in love with Megala Devi, whose father and brother have recently died and who refuses to see charming things, be in the company of man and entertain lover or marriage proposals from anyone (Vasanthakumar included), until seven years have passed. Vasanthakumar then uses "Kalaimani" as an intermediary to profess his passionate love before Megala. However, forgetting about the seven years in his case, falls in love with Kalaimani as she does not realize Vasanthakumar's messenger is a woman in disguise.

Meanwhile, Chandrika has fallen love with Vasanthakumar, creating a love triangle between the trio: Chandrika loves Vasanthakumar, Vasanthakumar loves Megala, and Megala loves "Kalaimani", not knowing it is Chandrika. Adithan arrives in Vasanthapuri, adding to confusion of mistaken identity. Mistaking Adithan for Kalaimani, Megala asks him to marry her. Finally, when Kalaimani and Adithan appear in the presence of both Megala and Vasanthakumar, there is more wonder and confusion at their similarity. At this point, Chandrika reveals her disguise and that Adithan is her twin brother. This ends in declaration of marriage between Vasanthakumar, who marries Chandrika and Adithan, who marries Megala.

== Cast ==
Male cast

- S. A. Natarajan as Vasanthakumar
- K. R. Ramsingh as Durjayan
- K. Sarangapani as Anna Alanakara Bhoopathi
- Pulimoottai Ramasami Iyer as Mama
- K. Sayeeram as Wise Man
- Nat Annaji Rao as Satyavanathan
- M. K. Mustafa as Sailor
- E. R. Sahadevan as Kirthivarman
- C. P. Kittan as Kambhodi
- M. R. Santhanam as Varali
- C. V. V. Panthulu as Sanyasi

Female cast

- Anjali Devi as Megala
- Madhuri Devi as Adithan, Kalaimani, Chandrika
- M. S. Sivabhagyam as Singaram

Dance

- Lalitha & Padmini

== Production ==
In 1947, K. Ramnoth and A. K. Sekhar resigned from Gemini Studios. They were invited by M. Somasundaram to join his company Jupiter Pictures, and accepted. The first project they made for Jupiter was Kanniyin Kathali, an adaptation of the William Shakespeare play Twelfth Night. Ramnoth and Sekhar jointly produced the film, with the former also serving as director and screenwriter, and the latter as art director. S. D. Sundaram wrote the dialogues, W. R. Subba Rao handled the cinematography and T. Durairaj was the editor. The final length of the film was 15,342 feet (4,676 m).

== Soundtrack ==
Music by S. M. Subbaiah Naidu and C. R. Subbaraman, while lyrics were written by Bhoomi Balagadas, Kannadasan and K. D. Santhanam. This was the cinematic debut of Kannadasan, and the first song he wrote was "Kalangaathiru Manamey".

| Songs | Singers | Lyrics | Length |
|---|---|---|---|
| "Kalangaathiru Manamey" | K. V. Janaki | Kannadasan | 02:37 |
| "Puvy Raja" | M. L. Vasanthakumari & Thiruchi Loganathan | Kannadasan | 02:42 |
| "Kaaranam Theriyammal" | M. L. Vasanthakumari | Kannadasan | 02:28 |
| "Kandaen Ayya" | K. V. Janaki | Kannadasan | 02:19 |
| "Chithirai Paravaiyamma" | K. V. Janaki | Kannadasan | 03:07 |
| "Aasaipatten Machaan" | A. P. Komala | | |
| "Kalaivaaniye Nee" | M. L. Vasanthakumari | | |
| "Kalaiyin Perumai Solla" | K. Sarangapani | | |
| "Naane Ennathaan" | K. V. Janaki | | |
| "Purappaduvome Anne" | Thiruchi Loganathan | | |
| "Paayum Alai" | K. V. Janaki | | |
| "Yositthu Paaraamal" | Thiruchi Loganathan | | |
| "Penn Manam" | K. V. Janaki | | |
| "Vaanathu Muzhu" | K. V. Janaki | | |

== Release and reception ==
Kanniyin Kathali was released on 6 August 1949. According to historian Randor Guy, the film was not as commercially successful as expected to be; he believed this was due to the changing trends in Tamil cinema of that time, with audiences no longer being interested in films about royalty, though another historian S. Theodore Baskaran said the film was indeed a success.
