= Ponmudi (film) =

1950 film by Ellis R. Dungan

- Theatrical release poster
- Directed by: Ellis R. Dungan
- Written by: Bharathidasan
- Based on: Ethirparatha Mutham by Bharathidasan
- Produced by: T. R. Sundaram
- Starring: P. V. Narasimha Bharathi; Madhuri Devi; R. Balasubramaniam
- Cinematography: J. G. Vijayam
- Edited by: L. Balu
- Music by: G. Ramanathan
- Production company: Modern Theatres
- Distributed by: Broadway, Sun & Saraswathi
- Release date: 14 January 1950
- Running time: 170 minutes
- Country: India
- Language: Tamil

Ponmudi is a 1950 Tamil-language film directed by Ellis R. Dungan, produced by T. R. Sundaram of Modern Theatres and written by Bharathidasan. It is based on Bharathidasan's verse novel Ethirparatha Mutham (transl. The Unexpected Kiss). The film was released on 14 January 1950.

== Plot ==
Ponmudi explores the theme of passionate love defying rigid societal and parental opposition in the mid-20th century India. The courageous heroine breaks traditional gender stereotypes by actively leading a rescue mission to save her abducted lover and reunite their feuding families.

== Cast ==
Male cast

- Narsimha Bharathi
- R. Balasubramaniam
- Chakrapani
- Kali N. Rathnam
- Alwar Kuppusami
- Rama Krishnan
- K. K. Perumal
- Karunanidhi
- Ezhumalai

Female cast

- Madhuri Devi
- Saraswathi
- Dhanalakshmi
- Muthulakshmi
- Lalitha

Dance

- Lalitha-Padmini
- Sinha-Party

== Production ==
Producer T. R. Sundaram of Modern Theatres wanted to make a film based on Edhirparatha Mutham, a novel by Tamil poet and writer Bharatidasan. Ellis Dungan was hired to direct Bharathidasan's script. The film was made at the Modern Theatres studio in Salem. Some scenes were also filmed in Yercaud. For shooting beach scenes, Dungan had a beach set constructed in Salem, out of sand brought from Adyar beach. The film had intimate love sequences which were unusual in the then conservative Tamil film industry.

== Soundtrack ==
The music was composed by G. Ramanathan while the lyrics were penned by Ka. Mu. Sheriff and A. Maruthakasi.

Song	Singer(s)
"Neela Vanum Nilavum Pol"	G. Ramanathan & T. V. Rathnam
"Van Mazhaiyindri Vadidum Payir Pola"	G. Ramanathan & T. V. Rathnam
"Nam Jeevaatharame Selvam Agume"	G. Ramanathan
"En Prema Rooba...Inbathin Ellai Ithuthana"	T. V. Rathnam
"Vaazha Venum Vaazha Venum"	Kali N. Rathnam
"Aruyire Premai Amudha Variyil"	G. Ramanathan & T. V. Rathnam
"Dhesamenggum Nalvalam"	G. Ramanathan
"Meikadhal Arumbu Vazhvinile Poothathe Indre"	G. Ramanathan & T. V. Rathnam
"Vaanam Kumurudhammaa"	U. R. Chandra & N. Lalitha
"En Kaalamo Maranam"	G. Ramanathan

== Release and reception ==
Ponmudi was released on Pongal day, 14 January 1950, and was distributed by Broadway, Sun & Saraswathi in Madras. It was a commercial failure as its intimate scenes shocked the Tamil audience. The film was criticised in the press for being "vulgar" and Dungan was accused of "corrupting the population with American ways". Despite this, J. G. Vijayam's cinematography was acclaimed and won him an award.
