= Nalla Thangai =

- Film poster
- Directed by: S. A. Natarajan
- Written by: A. P. Nagarajan
- Produced by: S. A. Natarajan
- Starring: M. N. Nambiar; Madhuri Devi; Rajasulochana; S. A. Natarajan; T. S. Balaiah
- Cinematography: J. G. Vijayam
- Edited by: T. Vijayarangam
- Music by: G. Ramanathan
- Production company: Forward Art Films
- Release date: 5 February 1955
- Running time: 155 minutes
- Country: India
- Language: Tamil

Nalla Thangai (transl. Good Younger Sister) is a 1955 Indian Tamil-language drama film produced and directed by S. A. Natarajan. The film stars M. N. Nambiar, Madhuri Devi, Rajasulochana, S. A. Natarajan and T. S. Balaiah. It was released on 5 February 1955.

== Cast ==
The lists of cast and crew were adapted from Film News Anandan's database and from the film credits.

- M. N. Nambiar
- T. S. Balaiah
- S. A. Natarajan
- V. M. Ezhumalai
- A. Karunanidhi
- Pulimoottai Ramasami
- K. Sairam
- Yadhartham Ponnusamy
- M. M. A. Chinnappa
- T. R. Natarajan
- C. K. Soundararajan
- D. K. Chinnappa
- M. V. Raju
- P. K. Raghavan
- Madhuri Devi
- P. R. Sulochana
- C. R. Rajakumari
- M. S. S. Packiam
- S. K. Venubhai
- K. Shantha Devi
- S. N. Lakshmi
- Lalitha
- Sundaramma

Dance

- C. R. Rajakumari
- Kumari Susheela

== Soundtrack ==
Music was composed by G. Ramanathan.

Song	Singer/s	Lyricist	Duration (m:ss)
"Ennai Pole Bhagyasaali"	Jikki & P. Leela	Ka. Mu. Sheriff	
"Thaene Paage Thevittadha"	(Radha) Jayalakshmi	Ka. Mu. Sheriff	
"Maappille Makku Maappille"	P. Leela & A. G. Rathnamala	A. Maruthakasi	
"A, B, C, D Padikkiren"	Thiruchi Loganathan & Sirkazhi Govindarajan	A. Maruthakasi	
"Arivulla Azhagan"	Thiruchi Loganathan & Jikki	A. Maruthakasi	03:15
"O! Seemaane Thirumbi Paarkum"	T. V. Rathnam	A. Maruthakasi	
"Kalakalavenre Saalaiyil"	T. M. Soundararajan & Group	K. P. Kamatchisundaram	
"Thuyil Neengi Ezhundhiduval"	T. M. Soundararajan	R. Lakshmana Das	03:14
"Kooli Miga Ketpaar ... Engirundo Vanthan"	G. Ramanathan	Bharathiyar	06:18
