= Asai Anna Arumai Thambi =

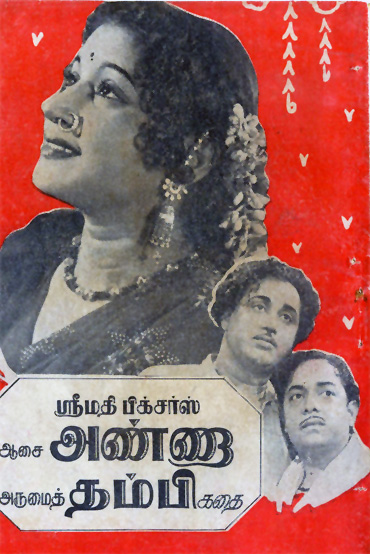
- Film poster
- Directed by: G. R. Rao
- Written by: Sakthi T. K. Krishnasamy
- Story by: S. Mukherjee
- Produced by: Madhuri Devi
- Starring: A. P. Nagarajan; T. R. Ramachandran; Madhuri Devi
- Cinematography: T. Marconi
- Edited by: B. Kandaswami; T. Vijayarangam
- Music by: K. V. Mahadevan
- Production company: Srimathi Pictures
- Release date: 29 July 1955
- Country: India
- Language: Tamil

Asai Anna Arumai Thambi is a 1955 Indian Tamil-language film directed by G. R. Rao. The film stars A. P. Nagarajan, T. R. Ramachandran and Madhuri Devi. It was released on 29 July 1955.

== Plot ==
Sivaraman and Balaraman are brothers living together and have no parents. Sivaraman is a graduate and looking for a job while Balaraman is not educated but is a wise man. He does the household works and respects his elder brother as a God.
Pandian lives in the same area and he told his daughter Kannamma to help Balaraman in cooking. Though Sivaraman is unemployed, he marries Kannamma on the recommendation by Balaraman. Soon the couple are blessed with a child.
Sivaraman has borrowed money from a lender but not repaid it for a long time. He absconds from the lender. However, one day the lender sees and starts chasing him. Sivaraman runs away and hides in a big house.
Zamindar Anandan lives in that house with his daughter Bharathi. He came to live in the city as he was scared of a big man called Sakuni in his village. Sakuni, true to his name, is a schemer. He makes his son an advocate so that the son can marry Bharathi and take over the Zamin.
Anandan sees the well built Sivaraman and appoints his as the manager of his zamin estate. Sivaraman had to go to the village in a rush even without informing his wife and younger brother.
While Sivaraman is encountered by Sakuni and undergoes many tribulations including going to jail on a charge of murder, Balaraman and Kannamma struggles due to poverty. How everything is settled forms the rest of the story.

== Cast ==
Adapted from the film's song book.

Male Cast

- A. P. Nagarajan as Sivaraman
- T. R. Ramachandran as Balaraman
- Sairam as Pandian
- V. M. Ezhumalai as Pandit
- Sivasuriyan as Anandam (Zamindar)
- Narayana Pillai as Sakuni
- A. Karunanidhi as Karuppu
- Raghuveer as Doctor Sukumaran
- Balaram as Folk dancer

Female Cast

- Madhuri Devi as Kannamma
- Rajasulochana as Bharathi
- Sushila as Kalyani
- Bhagyam as Segappu
- Vimala as Dhanam

== Soundtrack ==
Music was composed by K. V. Mahadevan.

Song	Singer/s	Lyricist	Length
"Pozhaikkum Vazhiyai Paaru"	K. V. Mahadevan, Thodi Kannan, S. C. Krishnan, Kumari Sushila, Kumari Udutha, Kumari Padma	A. Maruthakasi	06:14
"Irandha Kaala Vaazhvai Enni"	T. V. Rathnam	A. Maruthakasi	
"Payandhal Aaguma"	K. Devanarayanan, Kumari Udutha	A. Maruthakasi	02:08
"Kaanaadha Kaatshigalai Paaru"	K. V. Mahadevan, K. Rani	A. Maruthakasi	
"Kannaithan Parikkudhu"	R. Balasaraswathi Devi	A. Maruthakasi	03:17
"Sugam Peruveno"	R. Balasaraswathi Devi	A. Maruthakasi	03:25
"Valarum Jeevanada"	Thangappan	A. Maruthakasi	03:24
"Adhistam Romba Adhistam"	S. C. Krishnan	A. Maruthakasi	02:50
"Aanaanapattadhellaam"	Thiruchi Loganathan, A. V. Saraswathi	Thanjai N. Ramaiah Dass	
"Menakaiyum Naanuvaal"	K. Rani	Ka. Mu. Sheriff	03:03
