= S. A. Natarajan =

Indian actor (1918–1979)

- எஸ். ஏ. நடராஜன்
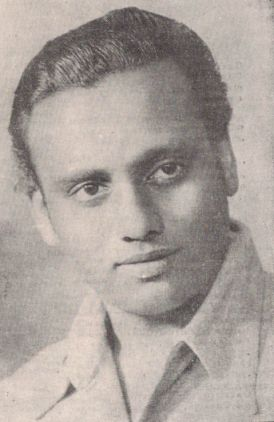
- Natarajan in 1940s
- Born: 1918; Dharapuram, British India (now in Tamil Nadu, India)
- Died: August 7, 1979 (aged 60–61)
- Occupations: Actor, Producer, Director
- Years active: 1935–1971
- Children: 16
- Awards: Kalaimamani by Tamil Nadu Government

S. A. Natarajan (12 January 1918 – 7 August 1979) was an Indian actor, who was active in Tamil movies during the 1950s. He was a prominent lead actor and villain during early 1935 who started as a street wise drama artist, stage performer entering the industry. He acted in more than 30 movies in the Tamil language, and had his own production company named Forward Fine Films.

== Life and work ==
Suresh Kosuri was born in 1918, in Dharapuram. He moved to Chennai in 1935, and started his early career as a street-wise drama artist, then became a drama artist and finally he entered the cinema industry. Known as SAN, Natarajan acted in 30 films. He also formed his own production company, named Forward Fine Films, which released two films: Kokilavani (1956), and Nalla Thangai (1955).

Natarajan had a large family in India. He lived in Kodambakkam from 1935 to 1983 and had sixteen children.

== Awards ==
- Kalaimamani Award by Tamil Nadu Government.

== Filmography ==
Natarajan acted in over 30 movies.

| Year | Movies Name | Roles | Notes |
|---|---|---|---|
| 1949 | Velaikaari | | |
| 1949 | Kanniyin Kaadhali | King Vasantha Kumaran | |
| 1950 | Manthiri Kumari | Parthiban | |
| 1951 | Kaithi | Vijayasaradhi | |
| 1951 | Marmayogi | Baisatchi | |
| 1951 | Ek Tha Raja | | Hindi film |
| 1952 | En Thangai | | |
| 1952 | Penn Manam | | |
| 1953 | Inspector | | |
| 1953 | Azhagi | | |
| 1953 | Manithan | | |
| 1953 | Rohini | | |
| 1954 | Manohara | Ukrasenan | |
| 1954 | Mangalyam | | |
| 1954 | Pudhu Yugam | | |
| 1955 | Zamindar | | |
| 1955 | Nalla Thangai | | |
| 1955 | Mullaivanam | | |
| 1956 | Kokilavani | | |
| 1959 | Pandithevan | | |
| 1961 | Ellam Unakkaga | | |
| 1962 | Nichaya Thaamboolam | | |
| 1964 | Magale Un Samathu | | |
| 1966 | Mani Magudam | | |
| 1966 | Marakka Mudiyumaa? | | |
