= Ambikapathy (1937 film) =

1937 Indian Tamil film

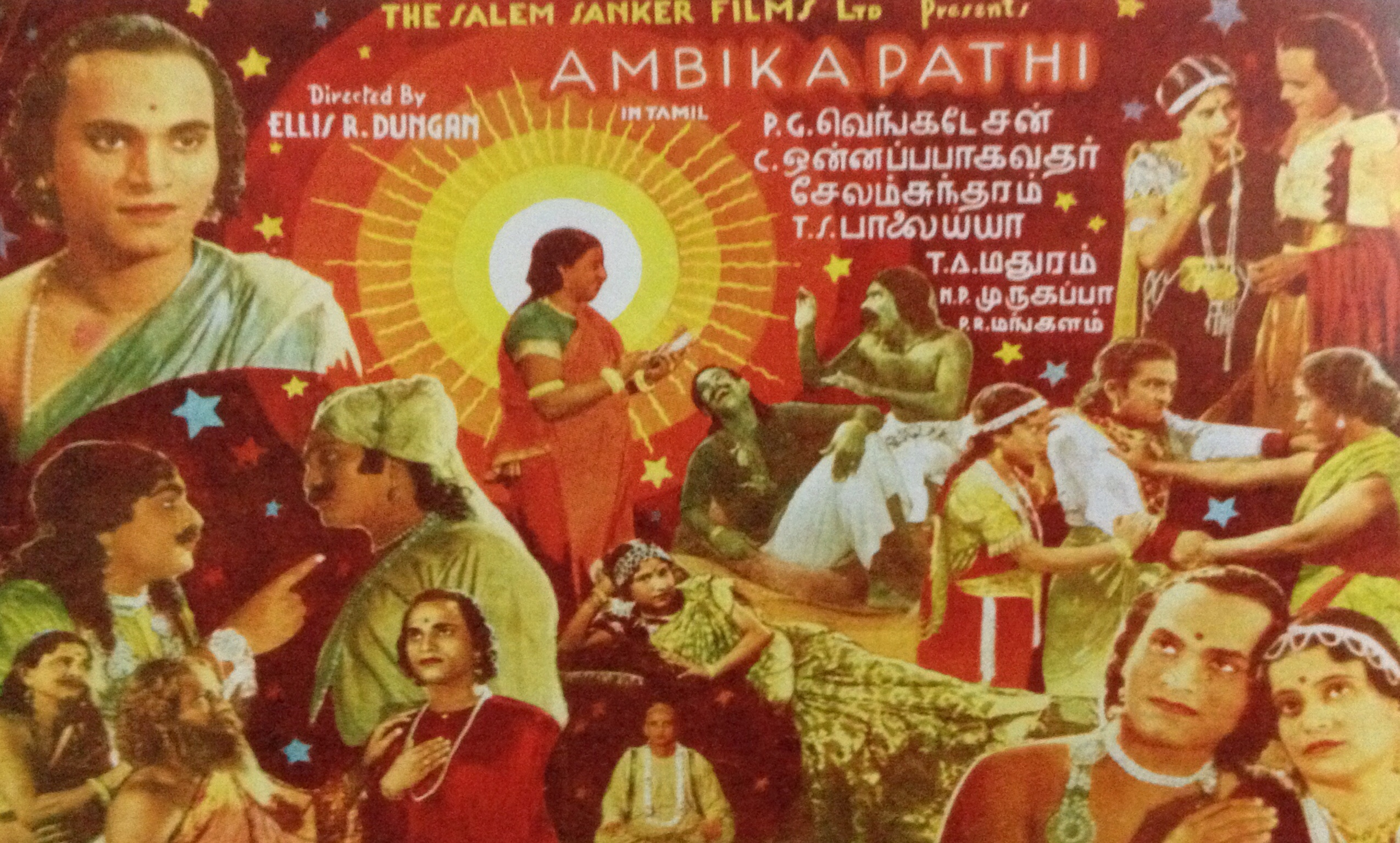
- Theatrical poster
- Directed by: Ellis R. Dungan
- Screenplay by: T. P. S. Mani; Elangovan
- Story by: Elangovan
- Starring: M. K. Thyagaraja Bhagavathar; M. R. Santhanalakshmi
- Cinematography: Bal Brigae; Krishnagopal
- Edited by: Ellis R. Dungan
- Music by: Papanasam Sivan
- Production company: Salem Shankar Films
- Distributed by: East India Film Company
- Release date: 11 December 1937 (India)
- Running time: 210 minutes
- Country: India
- Language: Tamil

Ambikapathy (also spelled as Ambikapathi) is a 1937 Indian Tamil musical period film directed by American film director Ellis R. Dungan. It starred M. K. Thyagaraja Bhagavathar, M. R. Santhanalakshmi, Serugulathur Sama, T. S. Balaiya, N. S. Krishnan, T. A. Madhuram and P. G. Venkatesan. Ambikapathy is regarded as one of the greatest hits of pre-independence Tamil cinema. Ambikapathy and Chintamani (also starring Bhagavathar) were the greatest hits of 1937 and made critics regard Bhagavathar as the "first superstar of Tamil cinema". This was the first Tamil film to name a music director in its credits.

== Plot ==
The film is based on a story set in the Chola Empire in year 1083 AD. The titular character, Ambikapathy (M K. Thyagaraja Bhagavathar), is the son of the Tamil poet Kambar (Serugulathur Sama) and is in love with the Chola princess and daughter of Kulothunga Chola, Amaravati (played by M. R. Santhanalakshmi). The king objects to their love and insists on testing Ambikapathy's literary mettle before judging his worth. The test given to Ambikapathi is that he should write and sing a hundred poems in the field of Puram (dealing with the themes of war and heroism). The poems should not have any reference to the field of Agam (dealing of love and romance). Ambikapathi begins the test in the King's court with a Kadavul Vaazhthu (invocation to God). Amaravathi who is keeping the count, mistakes the invocation as a poem and counts it as poem number one. When he has sung only ninety nine Puram poems, she thinks he has completed the task and signals him that hundred poems have been sung. Declaring victory, Ambikapathy sings of his love for her and thus fails the test. He is executed by the king.

== Cast ==
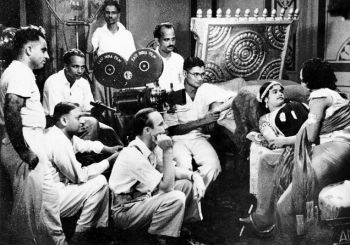
Ellis R. Dungan directing M. R. Santhanalakshmi in Ambikapathi

Male cast

- M. K. Thyagaraja Bhagavathar as Ambikapathi
- P. B. Ranagachari as Kulothunga Chozhan
- Serukulathur Sama as Kambar
- T. S. Balaiah as Rudrasenan
- S. S. Rajamani as Vanjikoti
- N. S. Krishnan as Kannan
- P. G. Venkatesan as Muniyan
- T. P. S. Mani as Ottakoothar
- Sundara Sastri as Pugazhedi
- Honnappa Bhagavathar as Dhontaman
- N. P. Murugappa as Marthandan
- T. V. Namasivayam as Boy

Female cast

- M. R. Santhanalakshmi as Amaravathi
- P. R. Mangalam as Maruthayi
- T. A. Mathuram as Sundari
- T. V. Subbuthayi as Madhurandaki
- Meenalochani as Thyagavalli

== Production ==
The film highlighted the Romeo-Juliet type romance between Bhagavathar and Santhanalakshmi. Dungan who did not know Tamil, used Shakespeare's Romeo and Juliet as an inspiration and incorporated some of its scenes in the script. The writer for the film was the Tamil scholar Thanigachalam working under the pen name Elangovan. He translated the scenes Dungan had marked out from Shakespeare into Tamil. One of them was the balcony scene. The lines describing Romeo taking leave of Juliet – "Sleep dwell upon thine eyes, peace in thy breast", were translated by Elangovan as Thookkam Un Kangalai Thazhuvattum! Amaithi Un Nenjil Nilavattum. Dungan also introduced some daring (for that time period) intimate scenes like Ambikapathi carrying Amaravathi to the bed and Ambikapathi winking at her. The poet Kambar was played by Serugalathur Sama whose appearance was based on that of Rabindranath Tagore. T. S. Balaiya was cast as the villain Rudrasenan. The comic relief was provided by the husband and wife comedy team of N. S. Krishnan – T. A. Madhuram. The film was shot in East India Studio in Calcutta. Background score was composed by K. C. Dey, while Papanasam Sivan composed music and wrote lyrics for the Songs. The completed film was 19,000 fet in length (runtime : 210 minutes). Initially, the producer M. S. Thottana Chettiar, wanted Y. V. Rao to direct the film, but buoyed by the success ofChintamani, Rao demanded a huge amount of money as payment which the producers could not afford. Instead they hired the up-and-coming American film director Ellis R Gungan. Dungan, on hearing the story agreed to direct the film. A devadasi had earlier been chosen to form the lead pair with M.K. Thyagaraja Bhagavathar in the movie. But she refused when she discovered that M. K. Thyagaraja Bhagavathar was not a Brahmin and she had to be teamed up with another Brahmin actor in a minor role. M. R. Santhanalakshmi, a popular stage actress was cast as Amaravathi.

== Soundtrack ==
Film historian G. Dhananjayan says Ambikapathy is the first Tamil language film that named a music director in its credits. This film was also the first to give credibility and respect for dialogues.

All lyrics are written by Papanasam Sivan; all music is composed by Papanasam Sivan.

No.	Title	Lyrics	Singer(s)	Length
1.	"Aayakalaigal Arupathi Naanginaiyum"	Papanasam Sivan	M. K. Thyagaraja Bhagavathar	11:13
2.	"Chandra Sooriyar"	Papanasam Sivan	M. K. Thyagaraja Bhagavathar	2:47
3.	"Unnai Allaal"	Papanasam Sivan	M. K. Thyagaraja Bhagavathar	5:26
4.	"Ini Evvaru Marappen"	Papanasam Sivan	M. K. Thyagaraja Bhagavathar	2:30
5.	"Enna Seythaayi"	Papanasam Sivan	M. K. Thyagaraja Bhagavathar	1:38
6.	"Unnai Aadaiya"	Papanasam Sivan	M. K. Thyagaraja Bhagavathar	1:47
7.	"Mannulagil"	Papanasam Sivan	Serukalathur Sama	3:14
Total length:				28:49

== Reception ==
The film was released on 11 December 1937 and was a big box office success. It ran for 52 weeks. Dungan's love scenes, Bhagavathar's singing and Elangovan's dialogue made the film a talked after success. After Chintamani, this was the second hit film for Bhagavathar in 1937 and made him the "first superstar of Tamil cinema".

== See also ==
- M. K. Thyagaraja Bhagavathar
- Ellis R. Dungan
- Kollywood
- N. S. Krishnan
- Tamil cinema
- List of historical drama films of Asia
- Ambikapathy and Amaravathi
