= Elangovan =

Elangovan is a given name or surname, which may refer to:

- E. V. K. S. Elangovan (1948–2024), Indian politician
- G. Elangovan (active 1971–1977), Indian politician
- P. D. Elangovan (born 1953), Indian politician
- T. K. S. Elangovan (born 1954), Indian politician
