= Marmayogi (1964 film) =

- Theatrical release poster
- Directed by: B. A. Subba Rao
- Written by: Muddu Krishna (dialogues)
- Screenplay by: B. A. Subba Rao
- Story by: Jupiter Films Unit
- Based on: Marmayogi (1951)
- Produced by: S. K. Habibulla
- Starring: N. T. Rama Rao; Krishna Kumari; Kanta Rao; Leelavathi
- Cinematography: P. Dattu
- Edited by: K. A Marthand
- Music by: Ghantasala
- Production company: Jupiter Pictures
- Release date: 22 February 1964
- Running time: 140 minutes
- Country: India
- Language: Telugu

Marmayogi (transl. The Mysterious Sage) is a 1964 Indian Telugu-language swashbuckler film, produced by S. K. Habibulla and directed by B. A. Subba Rao. It stars N. T. Rama Rao, Krishna Kumari, Kantha Rao and Leelavathi with music composed by Ghantasala. The film is a remake of the 1951 Tamil film of the same name which was an adaptation of the novel Vengeance by Marie Corelli and William Shakespeare's play Macbeth.

== Cast ==
- N. T. Rama Rao as Prabhakar
- Krishna Kumari as Prabhavathi
- Kanta Rao as Bhaskar
- Leelavathi as Chenchala
- Gummadi as Maharaju / Marmayogi
- Chadalavada as Bairagi
- Balakrishna as Sannasi
- A. V. Subba Rao as Purushotham
- Meena Kumari as Chakarakelli

== Production ==
N. T. Rama Rao signed Marmayogi as part of a five-film deal with Jupiter Pictures.

== Soundtrack ==
Music composed by Ghantasala.

Song title	Lyrics	Singers	length
"Theeyanaina Hrudhayam"	Aarudra	P. Susheela	3:51
"Navvula Nadhilo"	Aarudra	P. Leela	3:25
"Madhuvu Manakela"	Aarudra	Ghantasala, K. Jamuna Rani, A. P. Komala	5:03
"Chodyam Choosaavaa"	Aarudra	P. Susheela	3:38
"Kadaganti Chooputho"	Aarudra	K. Jamuna Rani	1:32
"Raavaali Raavaali"	Aarudra	Ghantasala, K. Jamuna Rani	3:32
"Paaloyamma Paalu"	Aarudra	Ghantasala, P. Susheela	3:47
"Eelokamlo Vunnavile"	Kosaraju	Ghantasala, K. Jamuna Rani	3:33
