= Seemanthini (1936 film) =

1936 film by Ellis R. Dungan

- Theatrical release poster
- Directed by: Ellis R. Dungan
- Produced by: National Movie Tone
- Starring: T. P. Rajalakshmi; M. R. Krishnamoorthi; T. P. Rajagopal; M. S. Ramachandra Iyer; M. D. Rajam; Parvathi; Rukmani
- Cinematography: Jiten Banerjee
- Music by: Trichy T. V. Nataraja Chariyar
- Release date: 12 September 1936
- Running time: 165 min. (15000 Feet)
- Country: India
- Language: Tamil

Seemanthini is a 1936 Indian Tamil-language film by American film director Ellis R. Dungan and starring T. P. Rajalakshmi. It was Dungan's third film as director.
