= List of Tamil films of 1942 =

A list of films produced in the Tamil film industry in India in 1942:

== 1942 ==
Title	Director	Production	Music	Cast	Release date
Alli Vijayam					
Aanandan or Agni Purana Mahimai	S. D. S. Yogi	Mayuraa Films (S. S. S. Chokkalingam)	G. Ramanathan, T. A. Kalyanam Credited as Kalyanam Orchestra	Krishna Kanthan, P. Saraswathy	
Ananthasayanam	K. Subramanyam		V. S. Parthasarathy Ayyangar	K. Subramanyam, S. D. Subbulakshmi, M. V. Rajamma, G. Pattu Iyer, V. N. Janaki, R. B. Lakshmi Devi, Vidwan Srinivasan, P. R. Rajagopala Iyer, C. N. Sadasivaiah, K. Nagalakshmi, Kumari Subbulakshmi, M. R. S. Mani, Jolly Kittu Iyer, T. S. Rajammal, Vishnu R. S. Ramaswami Iyengar, S. Radhakrishnan, Kulathu Mani, Komaali Sambhu, Thanjavur Mani Iyer, Ramachandran	
Aaraichimani or Manuneethi Chozhan	P. K. Raja Sandow	Kandan & Co	Srinivasa Rao	P. B. Rangachari, M. R. Santhanalakshmi, N. S. Krishnan, T. A. Madhuram, Sandow M. M. A. Chinnappa Thevar, Veenai S. Balachander, S. Varalakshmi	
Bhaktha Naradar	S. Soundararajan	S. Soundararajan, Tamil Nadu Talkies	Papanasam Sivan. Background music by M. D. Parthasarathy & S. Rajeswara Rao	Ranjan, Rukmini, Baby Jaya, Kothamangalam Subbu, T. E. Krishnamachari, Kothamangalam Seenu, L. Narayana Rao, M. S. Vijayal, T. N. Meenakshi, S. R. Vijaya, M. S. Sundhari Bai, M. V. Mani, Kumari, Murali	25-04-1942
Chogamelar	C. V. Raman	C. V. Raman, Lalitha Cinetone	G. Sundara Bhagavathar	Kothamangalam Seenu, K. Aranganayaki, M. R. Radha, Kulathu Mani, P. S. Gnanam, T. K. Pushpavalli	
College Kumari	G. G. Mama Sindhe	Prakjjothi Pictures		M. Bhavani Sangkar, Robin Babu, G. R. Sandoa, Khoko, T. S. Dhamayandhi, K. S. Angamuthu, M. V. Sarojamma	21-02-1942
En Manaivi	Sundar Rao Nadkarni	A. V. Meiyappan, AVM Productions	R. Sudharsanam	K. Sarangapani, K. R. Chellam, Nagercoil K. Mahadevan, R. Padma, M. K. Meenalochani, Rallabandi Natesam	
Gangavathar	C. K. Sachi	KSS Pictures		N. C. Vasanthakokilam, Nagercoil K. Mahadevan, C. V. V. Panthulu, B. R. Panthulu, P. G. Venkatesan, D. Balasubramaniam, V. N. Janaki, T. S. Damayanthi, M. Lakshmanan, R. Rajagopalan, S. K. Padmadevi, T. V. Lakshmi, Kali N. Rathnam, C. T. Rajakantham, T. S. Durairaj, M. R. Swaminathan, P. R. Mangalam, T. V. A. Poorani	13-02-1942
Kannagi	R. S. Mani	M. Somasundaram & S. K. Mohideen, Jupiter Pictures	S. V. Venkatraman	P. U. Chinnappa, P. Kannamba, M. S. Saroja, N. S. Krishnan, T. A. Madhuram, M. Saroja, S. V. Sahasranamam, T. R. Ramachandran, U. R. Jeevarathinam and dance by B. S. Saroja	22-08-1942
Krishna Pidaran	C. V. Raman	T. K. Productions	G. Ramanathan	Vaikkam Mani, Kothamangalam Seenu, C. V. V. Panthulu, N. S. Krishnan, T. A. Madhuram, Mayavaram Pappa, P. S. Gnanam	07-01-1942
Manamaaligai	D.V. Swami		P. S. Srinivasarao	P. S. Srinivasarao, S. R. Sandoa, M. V. Raju, S. S. Mani, M. A. Rajamani, Seethalakshmi, Kamalabai	
Manonmani	T. R. Sundaram	T. R. Sundaram, Modern Theatres	T. A. Kalyanam Credited as Kalyanam Orchestra	P. U. Chinnappa, T. R. Rajakumari, Serukulathur Sama, T. S. Balaiah, T. R. Mahalingam, N. S. Krishnan, T. A. Madhuram, Kali N. Rathnam, C. T. Rajakantham, R. Balasubramaniam, K. K. Perumal, A. Sakunthala, L. Narayana Rao, S. S. Kokko, P. R. Mangalam, P. G. Venkatesan, T. R. B. Rao, M. E. Madhavan, Buffoon Shanmugham, J. M. G. Sarada, G. Saraswathi	07-11-1942
Mayajothi	R.Padmanaban	Modern Theatres	Shama	T. R. Mahalingam, Kali N. Rathnam, P. G. Venkatesan, T. S. Durairaj, Meenakshi Ammal, T. S. Rajalakshmi, C. T. Rajakantham	15-08-1942
Nandanar	Murugadasa (A. Muthuswami Iyer)	S. S. Vasan, Gemini Studios	M. D. Parthasarathy & S. Rajeswara Rao	M. M. Dandapani Desikar, Serukulathur Sama, Kothamangalam Subbu, L. Narayana Rao, M. S. Sundhari Bai	20-09-1942
Panchamirtham (Naadaga Medai & Thiruvaazhatthaan)	Jithan Banerji			K. Sarangapani, L. Narayana Rao, P. D. Sammantham, T. S. Vijaya, C. K. Kamalam, P. R. Mangalam, P. A. Periyanayaki	
Pookailas					
Prithivirajan	B. Sampathkumar	Central Studios and Haran Talkies	G. Ramanathan	P. U. Chinnappa, A. Sakunthala, T. S. Balaiah, T. M. Ramaswami Pillai, M. R. Santhanalakshmi, S. D. Subbaiah, G. M. Basheer, N. S. Krishnan, T. A. Mathuram, T. K. Sampangi, T. R. B. Rao, S. Velusami Kavi, Kali N. Rathnam, C. T. Rajakantham, P. S. Gnanam, K. K. Krishnaveni	29-04-1942
Rajasooyam	Shama-Ramu	Bharath Pictures		V. N. Sundaram, Serukalathur Sama, R. Balasubramaniam, C. V. V. Panthulu, K. V. Jeya Gowri, S. C. Gompathi, P. R. Mangalam	04-04-1942
Samsari	M. Krishnaratnam	Jupiter Films	Nataraja Achari	Gavai Sathasivam, P. T. Ram, Puthukottai S. Rukmani, Vikatakavi Mariyappa, T. K. Ranjitham, K. Varalakshmi, K. Rajalakshmi, T.'A. Rajeswari, M. Natanam, T. S. Lokanathan, P. S. B. Thondaiman	
Sanyasi	M. Krishnaratnam	Jupiter Films	M. S. Gnanamani	P. A. Kumar, P. G. Venkatesan, M. L. Pathi, C. S. D.Singh, Kottapuli Jayaram, P. S. Gnanam, P. R. Mangalam, T. S. Jaya, Loose Arumugam, Master Thangavel, M. V. Swaminathan and Kumari Selva	
Sathi Sukanya	T. R. Sundaram & P. V. Chari	Sri Meenakshi Film Company	T. A. Kalyanam (Lyrics: P. R. Rajagopala Iyer)	C. Honnappa Bhagavathar, T. R. Rajakumari, T. R. Mahalingam, Kali N. Rathnam, V. M. Ezhumalai, S. S. Kokko (Real name: Pasupuleti Srinivasulu Naidu)	
Sivalinga Satchi	S. Nottani	T. R. Sundaram, Modern Theatres	T. A. Kalyanam	C. S. Ganesa Bhagavadar, Kali N. Rathnam, M. R. Swaminathan, T. S. Durairaj, A. K. Rajalakshmi, C. T. Rajakantham, M. M. Radha Bai, T. N. Meenatchi	
Soma Mayilar					
Tamizhariyum Perumal	T. R. Raghunath	R. Ramanathan Chettiar, Uma Pictures		V. A. Chellappa, M. G. Ramachandran, M. R. Santhanalakshmi, R. Balasubramaniam, T. S. Durairaj, M. S. Devasena, M. G. Chakrapani, T. S. Jaya, Kali N. Rathnam, C. T. Rajakantham, Kumari Mangalam - S. Yogambal (later Yogam-Mangalam), K. N. Rajalakshmi, V. Nataraj	25-04-1942/30-04-1942
