= List of Tamil films of 1948 =

The following is a list of films produced in the Tamil film industry in India in 1948 in alphabetical order.

== 1948 ==
Title	Director	Production	Music	Cast	Release date (D-M-Y)
Abhimanyu	M. Somasundaram & A. Kasilingam	Jupiter Pictures	S. M. Subbaiah Naidu & C. R. Subburaman	S. M. Kumaresan, P. V. Narasimha Bharathi, U. R. Jeevarathinam, M. R. Santhanalakshmi, M. G. Ramachandran, D. Balasubramaniam, S. V. Subbaiah, R. Malathi, M. N. Nambiar	06-05-1948
Ahimsa Yuttham	A. K. Chettiar	Prakash Pictures		Mahatma Gandhi's Documentary	02-11-1948
Adhithan Kanavu	T. R. Sundaram	Modern Theatres	G. Ramanathan	T. R. Mahalingam, Anjali Devi, T. R. Rajani, K. P. Kesavan, M. G. Chakrapani, Kali N. Rathnam, C. T. Rajakantham	11-12-1948
Bhaktha Jana	P. Pullaiah	Ragini Films	Reema – Narayanan & B. Narasimha Rao	Honnappa Bhagavathar, V. Nagayya, Santha Kumari, K. Sarangapani, B. R. Panthulu, T. V. Kumudhini	
Bhojan	L. S. Ramachandran; T. R. Sundaram (Supervising)	Jayaprakash Pictures	G. Ramanathan	P. S. Govindan, S. Varalakshmi, R. Balasubramaniam, Kali N. Rathnam, C. T. Rajakantham, P. S. Siva Bhagyam, P. K. Saraswathi	31-07-1948
Bilhana	B. N. Rao	Mubarak Pictures	Papanasam Sivan	K. R. Ramasamy, A. R. Sakunthala, R. Balasaraswathi Devi, S. M. Shaikappa, M. Jayashree, 'Pulimoottai' Ramasami, K. S. Angamuthu	01-11-1948
Bilhanan	K. V. Srinivasan	T. K. S. Brothers Salem Shanmuga Films	T. A. Kalyanam	T. K. Shanmugam, T. K. Bhaghavathi, M. S. Draupadhi, T. K. Sivathanu, Friend Ramasami, Rajam	23-04-1948
Brahma Rishi Vishwamitra	Jagannath	Jegannath Productions	Reema — Narayanan	K. R. Ramsingh, T. V. Sethuraman, Kosalram, T. E. Krishnammachari, T. R. Rajakumari, N. R. Nalini, N. S. Krishnan, T. A. Madhuram	03-01-1948
Chakra Dhari	K. S. Gopala Krishnan	Gemini Studios	M. D. Parthasarathy	V. Nagayya, Pushpavalli, Surya Prabha, Nagercoil K. Mahadevan, Gemini Ganesan, L. Narayana Rao, T. N. Kamalam	03-12-1948
Chandralekha	S. S. Vasan	S. S. Vasan, Gemini Studios	S. Rajeswara Rao	M. K. Radha, T. R. Rajakumari, Ranjan, M. S. Sundhari Bai, N. S. Krishnan, T. A. Madhuram, V. N. Janaki, Velayudham, V. S. Susheela, Javar Seetharaman, T. E. Krishnamachari, L. Narayana Rao, Veppatthur Kittu	09-04-1948
Devadasi	M. L. Tandan-T. V. Sundaram	Sukumar Pictures	K. V. Mahadevan	Kannan, Leela, T. S. Durairaj, R. Balasubramaniam, N. S. Krishnan, T. A. Mathuram, K. S. Angamuthu	15-01-1948
En Kanavar	S. Balachander	Ajith Pictures	S. Balachander	S. Balachander, S. Nandini, V. Seetharaman, S. Guruswami, K. R. Chellam, T. K. Pattammal, V. Chellam, T. S. Kokilam, Baby Vijayal, Baby Rukmini	
Gnana Soundari (Citadel film)	F. Nagoor, Joseph Thaliath Jr.	Citadel Pictures	S. V. Venkatraman	T. R. Mahalingam, M. V. Rajamma, D. Balasubramaniam, P. S. Sivabhaghyam, P. G. Venkatesan, P. R. Mangalam, 'Pulimootai' Ramasami	21-05-1948
Gnana Soundari (Gemini film)	Murugadasa	Gemini Studios	M. D. Parthasarathy	M. K. Radha, Suseela, T. R. Ramachandran, P. Kannamba, T. E. Krishnamachari	18-06-1948
Gokuladasi	K. Subrahmanyam	Madras United Artistes Corporation	S. V. Venkatraman	C. Honnappa Bhagavathar, M. V. Rajamma, T. R. Ramachandran, N. Krishnamurthi, Sowdhamini, K. S. Angamuthu, Padmini	31-11-1948
Idhu Nijama	Krishna Gopal	K. G. Productions	S. Balachander	S. Balachander, Kumari N. Rajam, Sarojini, V. Seetharaman, A. S. Nagarajan, Manuel, Pattammal	06-03-1948
Jambam	Javeri and V. Kumaraswamy	Ken Pictures	K. V. Mahadevan	V. Kumar, Vanaja, P. G. Venkatesan, P. R. Mangalam, K. S. Angamuthu, T. V. Sethuraman, Rajeswari	15-01-1948
Jeevajothi	K. K. Multhani	Guhan Pictures	Ninumasumdass-Tanjore Janarthan	Serukalathur Sama, T. P. Rajalakshmi, P. S. Srinivasa Rao, M. L. Pathi, K. Mahadevan, M. V. Navaneetham, K. K. Krishnamani, M. J. Jeyanthi	15-01-1948
Kaamavalli	Manickam	Baskar Pictures	C. N. Pandurangan	Nagercoil Mahadevan, S. Varalakshmi, T. S. Durairaj, C. Krishnaveni, Rajagopala Bhagavadhar, V. M. Ezhumalai, T. S. Jaya, C. D. Kannabiran, K. S. Angamuthu	20-03-1948
Kangkanam	S. K. Vasagan	G. B. Narayanan & Co.	H. R. Padmanabha Sastry	K. R. Ramasamy, Menaka, P. G. Venkatesan, Leela, P. R. Mangalam, Narendra Nath, M. R. Swaminathan	10-06-1948
Krishna Thulabaaram	T. Balaji Singh	Santhanam Pictures	C. N. Pandurangan	Nagercoil Mahadevan, Jayashree, A. K. Srinivasan, G. Rajan, T. Krishnamoorthy, Sathyabama	16-04-1948
Lakshmi Vijayam	Bomman D. Irani	Sri Meenakshi Films	G. Ramanathan	P. S. Govindan, Madhuri Devi, C. V. V. Panthulu, M. R. Santhanalakshmi, Vidwan Srinivasan, R. Padma, Kali N. Rathnam, K. T. Saku Bhai, M. S. Gnanam	07-04-1948
Mahabali		Bama Pictures		G. Varadhachari, Lakshmi	
Mariamman	L. S. Ramachandran	Selvam Film Company	P. V. Sharma	T. S. Balaiah, M. R. Santhanalakshmi, S. V. Subbaiah, V. A. Chellappa, P. S. Gnanam, R. Padma	20-03-1948
Mohini	Lanka Sathyam	Jupiter Pictures	S. M. Subbaiah Naidu & C. R. Subburaman	T. S. Balaiah, M. G. Ramachandran, V. N. Janaki, Madhuri Devi, R. Balasubramaniam, 'Pulimoottai' Ramaswami, M. N. Nambiar	31-10-1948
Naveena Valli	T. Balaji Singh	Santhanam Pictures	C. N. Pandurangan	C. D. Kannapiran, Padma, S. Ragavan, Jayashree, A. Govindan, Neela	16-04-1948
Pizhaikkum Vazhi	R. Mithra Das	Maragadha Pictures	G. Aswathama	T. S. Durairaj, T. A. Jayalakshmi, T. S. Balaiah, M. R. Swaminathan, Kali N. Rathnam, P. G. Venkatesan, C. T. Rajakantham, P. S. Gnanam, P. R. Mangalam	
Raja Mukthi	Raja Chandrasekhar	Narendra Pictures	C. R. Subburaman	M. K. Thyagaraja Bhagavathar, P. Bhanumathi, V. N. Janaki, M. G. Ramachandran, Serukulathur Sama, M. R. Swaminathan, P. S. Veerappa, P. G. Venkatesan, C. T. Rajakantham	09-10-1948
Ramadas	Y. V. Rao	Sri Jagadeesh Pictures	Papanasam Sivan	Kalakkad S. Ramanarayana Iyer, Y. V. Rao, Rukmini, M. Sathyanarayana, S. Rangaswamy, N. Anandhaacharya, K. Mahalinga Iyer, Jeyagowri, Baby Radha, Ranganayagi, Lakshmi	06-06-1948
Samsaram	Babu Rao Sowhan	Eastern Pictures		B. S. Raja Iyengar, K. K. Krishnaveni, Vimalkumar, Nagarathinam, P. K. Madhavan, K. A. Thangavelu, Visalakshi	
Samsara Nowka	H. L. N. Simha	Star Combines and Pragathi Pictures	G. Govindarajulu Naidu	B. R. Panthulu, Trichur Premavathi, T. R. Ramachandran, T. Suryakumari, M. J. Andal, T. R. Upendra, Vikatam Krishnamurthi	14-05-1948
Senbagavalli	Lanka Sathyam	Srikanthar Films	Pasavankudi Sharma	T. S. Balaiah, P. A. Periyanayaki, K. K. Perumal, P. R. Rajagopala Iyer, V. M. Ezhumalai, K. V. Srinivasa, M. S. Vijayal, Bejavada Rajaratnam	20-02-1948
Sigamani	S. K. Vasagan & Sudharshan	Sudharshan Trading Company	V. Dakshinamoorthy	T. R. Sarangapani, C. T. Kamatchi, V. S. Mani, Jayalakshmi, Kulathu Mani, Vanaja	11-02-1948
Sri Aandal	S. Velsamy Kavi	Salem Surya Films	G. Ramanathan	U. R. Jeevarathinam, P. S. Govindan, 'Vidwan' Srinivasan, S. D. Subbaiah, G. Sowthamini, Kali N. Rathnam, S. Subbulakshmi, P. S. Gnanam	
Thirumalisai Alvar	D. S. Kotnis & P. S. Chettiar	Sri Kanna Films	S. V. Venkatraman & T. R. Ramanathan	M. M. Dandapani Desikar, Trichur Premavathi, 'Vidwan' Srinivasan, P. B. Rangachari, S. V. Subbaiah, R. Balasubramaniam, T. S. Durairaj, M. S. Devasena, P. K. Saraswathi, P. S. Sivabhagyam, K. S. Angamuthu	20-08-1948
Vanavil	K. R. Sanjeevi-Pal G. Kadhar	Rainbow Film Exchange	Thilagam	H. R. Kamaraki, Thilagam, Sriniavasan, Mahendran, Suseela Devi, Jeyalakshmi, Kamala Bai	
Vedhala Ulagam	A. V. Meiyappan	AVM Productions	R. Sudharsanam	T. R. Mahalingam, P. R. Mangalam, K. Sarangapani, K. R. Chellam, R. Balasubramaniam, Pandaribai, C. T. Rajakantham, G. M. Basheer, Kulathu Mani	11-08-1948
