= Manchi Chedu =

1963 film directed by T. R. Ramanna

- Theatrical release poster
- Directed by: T. R. Ramanna
- Story by: Acharya Aatreya
- Based on: Paasam (Tamil)
- Produced by: T. R. Ramanna
- Starring: N. T. Rama Rao; B. Saroja Devi
- Cinematography: M. A. Rahman
- Edited by: R. Rajagopal
- Music by: Viswanathan–Ramamoorthy
- Production company: R. R. Pictures
- Release date: 7 November 1963
- Country: India
- Language: Telugu

Manchi Chedu (transl. The Good and the Evil) is a 1963 Indian Telugu-language drama film, produced and directed by T. R. Ramanna. It stars N. T. Rama Rao and B. Saroja Devi, with music jointly composed by Viswanathan–Ramamoorthy. The film was a remake of Tamil film Paasam.

== Cast ==
- N. T. Rama Rao
- B. Saroja Devi
- Nagabhushanam
- Padmanabham
- Ramana Murthy
- T. R. Rajakumari
- Pushpavalli
- Chaya Devi
- Allu Rama Lingayya

== Soundtrack ==
Music composed by Viswanathan–Ramamoorthy. Lyrics were written by Acharya Aatreya.

S. No.	Song title	Singers	length
1	"Pudami Puttenu"	Ghantasala	3:38
2	"Thodu Needa"	P. Susheela	3:40
3	"Dora Dora Vayasu"	Ghantasala, P. Susheela	3:04
4	"Jal Jal Jal"	S. Janaki	3:43
5	"Repanti Roopam"	Ghantasala, P. Susheela	3:38
6	"Therela Gudiyela"	P. Susheela	4:37
7	"Poochina Poove"	P. Susheela	3:58
