= Kumara Kulothungan =

- Directed by: I. Raja Rao
- Cinematography: G. G. Mama Shinde
- Edited by: P. M. Thambu Setty, D. G. George
- Music by: A. M. Nataraja Mudaliar
- Production company: Deccan Cinetone
- Release date: 1941
- Country: India
- Language: Tamil

Kumara Kulothungan is a 1939 Indian, Tamil-language film directed by I. Raja Rao The film featured T. R. Rajakumari in the lead role credited as T. R. Rajalakshmi.

== Cast ==
The list was compiled from the book Thamizh Cinema Ulagam

Male

- C. D. Kannapiran as Kumara Kulothungan
- G. Gopal as Poet Pugazhendhi
- P. Subbaiah Thevar as Poet Ottakoothar
- S. Nandaram as Chozha Commander Ukkirasenan
- T. T. Arasu as Parakrama Pandiyan
- A. Meganathan as Poet Kambar
- P. M. Ummar as Pandiyan Commander
- G. M. Govindasamy as Pandiyan minister
- S. M. Thangaraj as Pandiyan minister
- A. R. Venkataram as Chozha minister
- P. A. Santhanam as Chithreegan

Support cast

- A. R. Ramadas
- V. M. Menon
- K. Govindasamy
- M. S. Murugesan (comedian)
- S. S. Kokko (comedian) (Real name: Pasupuleti Srinivasulu Naidu)

Female

- Rajalakshmi as Buvaneswari
- M. R. Mahalakshmi as Thyagavalli
- M. R. Meenakshi Bai as Pandiyan Queen
- M. K. Hamsaveni as Neelaveni
- N. Varalakshmi as Dancer Kanagavalli

Support cast

- S. Saraswathi
- K. Janaki
- T. M. J. Saradha (comedian)
- C. K. Selvambal (comedian)

== Production ==
The film was produced by Deccan Cinetone in their own studios at Kilpauk, Chennai. It was directed either by I. Raja Rao OR by R. Dwarakanath. Though the film was produced in 1939 there was no takers at that time. It was released only in 1941 after the success of Kacha Devayani in which T. R. Rajakumari created a sensation. In 1939, T. R. Rajakumari was credited with her real-life name, T. R. Rajaye but when this film was released in 1941, her name was changed as T. R. Rajalakshmi.

In an interview to Ananda Vikatan published on 5 July 1960, T. R. Rajakumari said the film was not released.

== Soundtrack ==
A. M. Nataraja Mudaliar wrote the lyrics and composed the music. There were 36 songs in the film 5 sung by T. R. Rajakumari. But no trace of any song is available now.

== Reception ==
Writing in 2014, Randor Guy says the film was a failure at the box-office.
