= Panakkaari =

- Theatrical release poster
- Directed by: K. S. Gopalakrishnan (Note: Not to be confused with the later director of the same name.)
- Based on: Anna Karenina by Leo Tolstoy
- Starring: T. R. Rajakumari; M. G. Ramachandran; V. Nagayya
- Music by: S. V. Venkatraman
- Production company: Uma Pictures
- Release date: 1 May 1953
- Country: India
- Language: Tamil

Panakkari (transl. Rich woman) is a 1953 Indian Tamil-language drama film directed by K. S. Gopalakrishnan. Starring T. R. Rajakumari, M. G. Ramachandran and V. Nagayya, it is an adaptation of the 1877 novel Anna Karenina by Russian writer Leo Tolstoy.

== Cast ==
List adapted from the database of Film News Anandan

Male cast

- M. G. Ramachandran
- V. Nagayya
- Javar Seetharaman
- C. V. V. Panthulu
- T. S. Durairaj
- K. A. Thangavelu

Female cast

- T. R. Rajakumari
- (Yogam)-Mangalam
- K. R. Chellam
- T. S. Jaya

== Production ==
Panakkaari was based on Russian writer Leo Tolstoy's novel Anna Karenina. It was directed by K. S. Gopalakrishnan under the technical supervision of Newtone Studio founder Jiten Bannerjee.

== Soundtrack ==
The music of the film was composed by S. V. Venkatraman, with lyrics by Papanasam Sivan, Thanjai Ramaiah Das, Lakshmana Das and Kuyilan.

Song	Singer/s	Lyricist
"Kanimadhura Mazhalai Mozhi Kanne"		
"Pengal Viduthalai Petra Magizhchchi"		
"Kaalam Therindhu Vaazhavendum Penne"		
"Beautyile Pottiyile...Isaintha Kaathaliyai Kettu"	P. Leela & group	
"Sundarin Jodiyaai Vaazhvile"		
"Kaalaiyil Inbam Kaanume"		
"Avaniyile Iyarkai Ezhil Pola"		
"Ammaavendre Nee Azhaithidum"	P. Leela	
"Ulaga Iyalbu Idhuve"		
"Needhi Enge Aneedhi Enge"		

== Release and reception ==
Panakkaari was released on 1 May 1953. According to historian Randor Guy, the film failed at the box office "mainly because of its ‘anti-sentimental’ storyline". During the same period, another film, Pitchaikkari, became a major commercial success; people in Madras would often joke, "Those who bought Panakkari became pitchaikkaarans (beggars), while buyers of Pitchaikkari became panakkarans (rich men)!"
