= Pudhumai Pithan =

Pudhumai Pithan (lit. 'Modern Madman') may refer to:

- Pudhumaipithan (1906–1948), an Indian writer in Tamil
- Pudhumai Pithan (1957 film), an Indian Tamil-language film starring M. G. Ramachandran
- Pudhumai Pithan (1998 film), an Indian Tamil-language film starring R. Parthiepan

== See also ==
- Pulamaipithan (1935–2021), Indian scholar, poet and lyricist
