= Lakshmi Vijayam (1948 film) =

- Film poster
- Directed by: Bomman D. Irani
- Screenplay by: D. V. Chari
- Story by: D. V. Chari
- Starring: P. S. Govindan; Madhuri Devi; C. V. V. Panthulu; M. R. Santhanalakshmi; R. Padma; Kali N. Rathnam
- Cinematography: G. Ranganathan
- Edited by: L. Balu
- Music by: G. Ramanathan
- Production companies: Sri Meenakshi Films & Co
- Distributed by: Modern Theatres
- Release date: April 7, 1948 (India)
- Running time: 162 mins
- Country: India
- Language: Tamil

Lakshmi Vijayam (transl. Visit of Lakshmi) is a 1948 Indian Tamil-language film directed by Bomman D. Irani. The film stars P. S. Govindan and Madhuri Devi.

== Plot ==
The narrative follows a fictional king who has twin daughters with vastly contrasting personalities, Amuda and Kumuda (both played by Madhuri Devi). To prevent future disputes over the throne, the king sends one of the daughters to be raised secretly in a forest under the care of a sage.

== Cast ==
The lists of cast and crew are adapted from the film credits.

Male cast

- P. S. Govindan as Vikraman
- C. V. V. Panthulu as Parakraman
- Vidwan Srinivasan as Premanandar
- G. M. Basheer as Meganathan
- E. R. Sahadevan as King of Avandhi
- K. R. Masilamani as Rajaguru
- Ramanujam as Maha Vishnu
- R. Devaraju as Minister
- M. R. Saminathan as Pandian
- M. V. Raju as Chakkamma's Father
- K. K. Radha as Deaf Groom
- T. R. Saminatha Pillai as Deaf Groom's Father

Female cast

- Madhuri Devi as Amudha & Kumudha
- M. R. Santhanalakshmi as Sasirekhai
- R. Padma as Kanchana
- M. M. Radha Bai as Queen of Avandhi
- Radhamani as Mahalakshmi
- K. T. Sakku Bai as Chakkamma
- Kandhimathi as Friend
- Ranganayagi as Friend
- Kumari Ramani as Friend
- Gandhimathi as Friend
- Parijatham as Friend

Guest Artists

- Kali Rathnam as Thoplan
- M. E. Madhavan as Chulian
- V. M. Ezhumalai as Appavi
- Sriramulu as Prohit
- P. S. Gnanam as Namudha

== Crew ==
- Director = Bomman D. Irani
- Dialogues = D. V. Chari
- Cinematography = G. Ranganathan
- Audiography = M. Radhakrishnan
- Editing = L. Balu
- Art = M. V. Kochappu
- Studio = Modern Theatres

== Soundtrack ==
Music was composed by G. Ramanathan while the lyrics were written by Sundara Vathiyar and Rajagopala Iyer.

S/N	Song	Singer/s	Lyricist	Duration (m:ss)
1	"Mada Maadhe Gopamum Agaadhe"	P. S. Govindan &	T. K. Sundara Vathiyar	02:30
2	"Rambai Thanai Polave Inbamaayi"		T. K. Sundara Vathiyar	02:36
3	"Naane Maiyal Aginen"	Kali N. Rathnam & P. S. Gnanam	T. K. Sundara Vathiyar	05:01
4	"Malar Vaname Unai Mevi"		T. K. Sundara Vathiyar	02:54
5	"Sariyendru Oru Vaarthai"	Kali N. Rathnam & P. S. Gnanam	T. K. Sundara Vathiyar	02:57
6	"Inbame Inbame Idhuve"		Rajagopala Iyer	02:52
7	"Sothanaiyo Ariyene Naane"	M. R. Santhanalakshmi	T. K. Sundara Vathiyar	02:10
8	"Iraivanin Thiranaiye"	Vidwan Srinivasan		02:56
9	"Azhagaana Vanidhaamani Naane"	R. Padma		02:14
10	"Kadhaale Amudhaavai Polave"	P. S. Govindan		02:42
11	"Samsaaram Venumenna"	M. R. Swaminathan & K. T. Sakku Bai		01:22
12	"Poga Solli Kadikka Vraadhe"	M. R. Swaminathan & K. T. Sakku Bai		01:10
13	"Varuvaar Kaadhalar"			02:27
14	"Kanngal Nirandha Kaadhal Purindha"	P. S. Govindan &		03:47
15	"Viyarvai Nilatthile Chotta Chotta"	Kali N. Rathnam & P. S. Gnanam		02:02
16	"Agathi Aayalgu... Neeyandro"			03:18
