= Aaravalli Sooravalli =

- Directed by: C. V. Raman
- Written by: G. S. Bhagavathar
- Screenplay by: C. V. Raman
- Story by: G. S. Bhagavathar
- Based on: Folklore of the same name
- Produced by: C. V. Raman
- Starring: K. Thavamani Devi; P. S. Govindan; V. A. Chellappa; Serukulathur Sama; M. R. Santhanalakshmi; Kali N. Rathnam; C. T. Rajakantham; P. S. Sivabaghyam
- Music by: G. Ramanathan
- Production company: Southern Theatres
- Distributed by: Maya Films
- Release date: 2 February 1946 (India)
- Running time: 122 mins (10999 ft.)
- Country: India
- Language: Tamil

Aaravalli Sooravalli is a 1946 Indian, Tamil language film directed by C. V. Raman. The film stars K. Thavamani Devi, V. A. Chellappa, P. S. Govinda, M. R. Santhanalakshmi and Serukulathur Sama.

== Plot ==
Aaravalli and Sooravalli are two sisters who rule a kingdom and establish a matriarchal society. Both have magical power. The king of the neighbouring country challenges them. The story deals with how he brings the sisters under his power.

== Cast ==
The list is adapted from the song book:

Male cast

- Serukulathur Sama as Dharmar
- V. A. Chellappa as Paramasivan
- P. S. Govindan as Allimuthu
- R. Balasubramaniam as Bheeman
- Nagarcoil Mahadevan as Naradar
- V. S. Mani as Abhimanyu
- T. B. Harihara Bhagavathar as Shri Krishnan
- V. S. Krishnamoorthi as Sahadevan
- Kali N. Rathnam as Vichithran
- T. S. Durairaj as Ponnan
- Kolathu Mani, Ezhumalai,
  Radha, N. R. S. Iyer as Comedy Actors

Female cast

- P. S. Sivabhagyam as Aaravalli
- C. T. Rajakantham as Sooravalli
- M. R. Santhanalakshmi as Sangavathi
- K. Thavamani Devi as Alankari
- T. S. Jaya, P. Leela Bayi,
  Gnanambal as Aaravalli's Sisters
- S. R. Janaki

== Production ==
The film was produced by Southern Theatres and was directed by C. V. Raman. G. S. Bhagavathar wrote the screenplay and dialogues.

== Soundtrack ==
Music was composed by G. Ramanathan and the lyrics were penned by Papanasam Sivan and G. S. Bhagavathar. Singers were V. A. Chellappa, Kali N. Rathnam, K. Thavamani Devi and T. S. Durairaj.

1. Aambale Un Maele - T. S. Durairaj, K. Thavamani Devi
