= Sathi Sukanya (1942 film) =

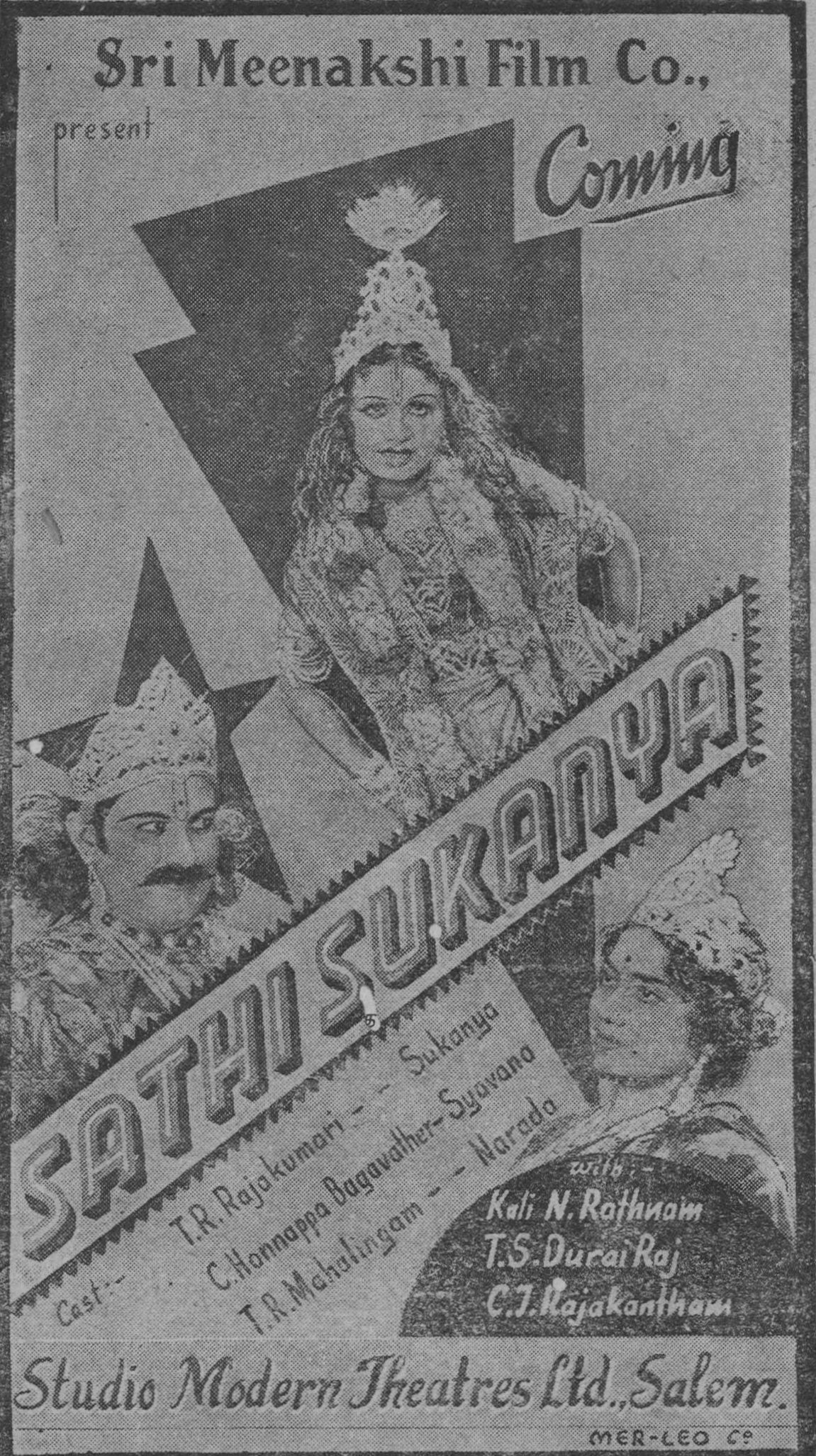
- Directed by: T. R. Sundaram
- Screenplay by: D. V. Chari
- Produced by: T. R. Sundaram
- Starring: C. Honnappa Bhagavathar; T. R. Mahalingam; T. R. Rajakumari
- Cinematography: A. Shanmugam
- Music by: T. A. Kalyanam
- Production company: Modern Theatres
- Release date: 1942
- Country: India
- Language: Tamil

Sathi Sukanya is a 1942 Indian, Tamil-language film produced and directed by T. R. Sundaram. The film stars C. Honnappa Bhagavathar and T. R. Rajakumari in the lead roles.

== Cast ==
The following list was compiled from the film's song book.

Male

- C. Honnappa Bhagavathar as Chayavanar (young)
- K. D. Santhanam as Chayavanar (old)
- T. R. Mahalingam as Naradar
- E. R. Sahathevan as Kruthavarman
- Kali N. Rathnam as Kallalagan
- V. M. Ezhumalai as Nambiyan
- T. S. Durairaj as Kavirayar
- S. S. Kokko as Jungle King's minister

Female

- T. R. Rajakumari as Sukanya
- C. T. Rajakantham as Valli
- G. S. Saraswathi as Indrani

== Production ==
The film was produced by Meenakshi Film company and filmed at Modern Theatres studio. T. R. Sundaram directed the film while D. V. Chari wrote the screenplay and dialogues. Cinematography was done by A. Shanmugam.

== Soundtrack ==
The music was composed by T. A. Kalyanam and his group played the orchestra. Papanasam P. R. Rajagopala Iyer penned the lyrics. Songs were sung by the actors who played the respective characters.
