= Ashadeepam =

1953 film

- Poster for both versions
- Directed by: G. R. Rao
- Written by: Ponkunnam Varkey 'Nagercoil' Padmanabhan (Tamil)
- Screenplay by: Ponkunnam Varkey
- Story by: Ponkunnam Varkey
- Produced by: T. E. Vasudevan
- Starring: Sathyan; B. S. Saroja; Gemini Ganesan; Padmini; T. N. Gopinathan Nair
- Cinematography: U. Rajagopal; Adi M. Irani; Venkitta Rao
- Edited by: M. S. Mani
- Music by: V. Dakshinamoorthy
- Production company: Associated Producers
- Release date: 18 September 1953
- Country: India
- Languages: Malayalam; Tamil

Ashadeepam (transl. The Lamp of Hope) is a 1953 Indian Malayalam-language film, directed by G. R. Rao and produced by T. E. Vasudevan. The film stars Sathyan, B. S. Saroja, Gemini Ganesan and Padmini. It was simultaneously produced in Tamil under the title Aasai Magan.

Ashadeepam is the Malayalam debut of Gemini Ganeshan, a romantic hero of Tamil cinema.

== Plot ==
Panikkar (T. N. Gopinathan Nair) is a wealthy landlord who lives in the same town as his widowed sister, Lakshmi Amma (Aranmula Ponnamma). Panikkar’s son, Shekhar (Gemini Ganeshan), leads a reckless life in the city, indulging in alcohol, gambling, and immoral pleasures. His "friends" Vikraman (T. S. Baliah) and the dancer Jayanthi (Padmini) scheme to deceive him through various schemes and gradually drain his wealth.

While that is going on, Lakshmi Amma struggles to raise her children, Chandran (Satyan) and Shantha (B. S. Saroja), with little to no support from her affluent brother or his wife, Bhanu Amma (Pankajavalli). After completing college, Chandran aspires to study law and seeks financial assistance from Panikkar, but Bhanu Amma humiliates him and sends him away empty-handed. Undeterred, Chandran borrows money from friends and leaves town to pursue his studies.

Believing that marriage might reform her son, Bhanu Amma - aided by her loyal servant Pankan (K. Ramaswami) - searches for a suitable bride for Shekhar. However, no family is willing to marry their daughter to a man of Shekhar’s ill reputation. As a result, Bhanu Amma schemes to arrange Shekhar’s marriage to Shantha. Though reluctant, Lakshmi Amma agrees under pressure. When Chandran learns of the secret plan, he rushes home but arrives too late to stop the wedding.

Unfortunately, marriage does not cause Shekhar to change his ways. Jayanthi and Vikraman successfully managed to weasel their way into gaining complete control over Shekhar's finances, while Shantha is cruelly mistreated in her marital home. She gives birth to a child, her health declines, and she is falsely accused of suffering from tuberculosis.

After completing his studies, Chandran returns home and brings Shantha back with him. He falls in love with Sarala (Girija), the daughter of the local postmaster. On the day of Chandran’s wedding, Panikkar’s grand mansion, Kamalalayam, is seized by the court following legal action from creditors to whom Shekhar owes vast sums. Chandran offers shelter to Bhanu Amma in his own home.

Meanwhile, Shekhar finally realizes the true nature and malicious intentions of Jayanthi and Vikraman and confronts them. During the ensuing fight, Vikraman is killed. Vikraman’s men proceed to murder Bhanu Amma in retaliation. Shekhar is arrested and sentenced to seven years in prison.

A transformed Shekhar later confesses his past mistakes to Shantha and Chandran. Shantha forgives her husband and promises to wait for his return, rekindling hope in his heart - Ashadeepam

== Cast ==
Male cast					Female cast				
Male cast					Cast (Malayalam)	Cast (Tamil)	Role (Malayalam)	Role (Tamil)	Ref.
Cast (Malayalam)	Cast (Tamil)	Role (Malayalam)	Role (Tamil)	Ref.	Padmini		Jayanthi		
Gemini Ganesan (credited as R. Ganesh in Tamil)		Sekhar			B. S. Saroja		Shantha		
T. S. Balaiah		Vikraman			Pankajavalli		Bhanu	Mangalam	
Sathyan		Chandran			Girija		Sarala		
T. N. Gopinathan Nair	B. R. Panthulu	Panicker	Sadhasiva Mudaliar		Aranmula Ponnamma	T. N. Meenakshi	Lakshmi		

=== Malayalam cast ===
Male cast

- V. Dakshinamoorthy as School Teacher
- J. Sasikumar
- Nanukkuttan

=== Tamil cast ===
Male cast

- T. P. Ponnusami Pillai as Post Master
- Friend Ramasami as Accountant
- Master Sethu as Sekhar (Jr)
- Master Sheriff as Chandran (Jr)

Female cast

- Baby Vasanthi as Shantha (Jr)
- ck saraswathi

Supporting cast

- S. S. Sivasooriyan, T. V. Sethuraman, V. P. S. Mani, V. T. Kalyanam, Pottai Krishnamoorthi, and Angamuthu.

== Soundtrack ==
The music was composed by V. Dakshinamoorthy. Lyrics in Tamil were penned by Kuyilan.

=== Malayalam ===
Song	Singers	Lyrics	Length
"Graamathin Hridayame"	Jikki (P. G. Krishnaveni)	P. Bhaskaran	
"Jagadanandhakaraka"	V. Dakshinamoorthy, P. Leela	Thyagaraja	06:28
"Janani Jayikka Neenal"	P. Leela, M. L. Vasanthakumari	P. Bhaskaran	
"Jeevithameevidhame"	P. Leela, Nagaiyyah	P. Bhaskaran	
"Kanmani Vava"	P. Leela	P. Bhaskaran	
"Karmabhalame"	Ghantasala	P. Bhaskaran	
"Maarivilloli"	Jikki (P. G. Krishnaveni)	P. Bhaskaran	
"Panthalittu"	P. Leela, A. M. Raja	P. Bhaskaran	
"Poo Veno"	P. Leela	P. Bhaskaran	
"Premamennaal Pulivaal"	P. Bhaskaran	P. Bhaskaran	
"Sharanam Mayilvaahanaa"	M. L. Vasanthakumari	P. Bhaskaran	
"Veeshi Pon Vala"	P. Bhaskaran	P. Bhaskaran	

=== Tamil ===
Song	Singers	Lyrics	Length
"Graamathin Idhayam Peranbin"	Jikki	Kuyilan	02:34
"Jagadanandhakaraka"	V. Dakshinamoorthy & P. Leela	Thyagaraja	06:28
"Kalaigal Migundha Engal Thamizh Vaazhgave"	M. L. Vasanthakumari & P. Leela	Kuyilan	03:36
"Maanida Vaazhvidhuve"	V. J. Varma & P. Leela	Kuyilan	03:24
"Thaalelo Raajaa En Kanne"	P. Leela	Kuyilan	03:11
"Vinaiyinaale Vandha Theemai"	Ghantasala	Kuyilan	03:36
"Vaana Villena Vandhu Kaadhalin"	Jikki	Kuyilan	02:44
"Odameri Chenre Kaadhal Kanaavile"	A. M. Rajah & P. Leela	Kuyilan	03:18
"Rajave Nalla Rojavai Paar"	P. Leela	Kuyilan	02:34
"Neeye Arul Velane"	M. L. Vasanthakumari	Kuyilan	02:15
"Paayum Kangalaal .. Kaalil Thanga Salangai"	P. Leela, V. J. Varma & Group	Kuyilan	03:24
