= Punjab Kesari (film) =

- Film poster
- Directed by: Fram Sethna
- Story by: Te. Po. Krishnasami Pavalar
- Starring: K. P. Kesavan; P. U. Chinnappa; Kali N. Rathnam; A. K. Rajalakshmi
- Production company: Star Films
- Release date: 1938
- Country: India
- Language: Tamil

Punjab Kesari (transl. The Lion of Punjab) is 1938 Tamil-language thriller film directed by Fram Sethna. It was adapted from Te. Po. Krishnasami Pavalar's Tamil-language play of the same name. The film adaptation stars K. P. Kesavan, P. U. Chinnappa, Kali N. Rathnam and A. K. Rajalakshmi.

== Plot ==
Sundaranathan is in love with Padma Bai (A. K. Rajalakshmi), the daughter of the wealthy Somanathan Prabhu. Somanathan decides to get his daughter married to Sundaranathan, but a villain lusts for her and her wealth. His gang kills Somanathan and frames Sundaranathan, who is arrested. A doctor hires detective Punjab Kesari to uncover the truth. Kesari and his assistant Karappanpoochi unmask the killer and the truth. Sudaranathan is exonerated, and marries Padma Bai.

== Cast ==
- K. P. Kesavan as Punjab Kesari
- P. U. Chinnappa as Sundaranathan
- A. K. Rajalakshmi as Padma Bai
- Kali N. Rathnam as Karapaanpoochi
- K. K. Perumal as the villain
- H. H. Sarma as Somanathan Prabhu
- Kannan as the doctor

== Production ==
Punjab Kesari was a popular play written by Te. Po. Krishnaswamy Pavalar. It was staged all over the Tamil-speaking areas of the Madras Presidency and also in neighbouring countries like Ceylon (now Sri Lanka), Malaya (now Singapore and Malaysia) and Burma (now Myanmar). The play's title was an allegorical reference to the Indian freedom fighter Lala Lajpat Rai, who was popularly known as Punjab Kesari (lit. 'Lion of Punjab'). Following the play's success, it was adapted into a feature film with the same title, directed by the Bombay-based Parsi filmmaker Fram Sethna and produced by the studio Star Films. Shooting took place at the National Movietone Studio, Madras. The final length of the film measured 16,000 feet (4,900 m).

== Soundtrack ==
The film's opening song was the Bankim Chandra Chatterjee-written "Vande Mataram", which urged Tamil people to participate in the Indian independence movement. Another song used in the film was the Tyagaraja composition "Tholi Nenu Chesina Pooja Palamu", with vocals the by lead actress A. K. Rajalakshmi.

== Reception ==
Film historian Randor Guy praised the performances of the cast and the storyline, though he felt it was "somewhat predictable". The film was an average success.
