= Kalavathi =

1951 film by L. S. Ramachandran

- Theatrical release poster
- Directed by: L. S. Ramachandran
- Screenplay by: L. S. Ramachandran
- Story by: T. K. Sundara Vathiyar; Chidambaram A. M. Nataraja Kavi
- Starring: T. S. Durairaj; T. A. Jayalakshmi; E. R. Sahadevan
- Cinematography: R. D. Mathur
- Edited by: N. P. Rathinam
- Music by: M. S. Gnanamani
- Production company: Windsor Productions
- Distributed by: Windsor Productions
- Release date: 23 February 1951
- Country: India
- Language: Tamil

Kalavathi (/kəˈlɑːvəθi/) is a 1951 Indian Tamil-language fantasy comedy film written and directed by L. S. Ramachandran based on a story by T. K. Sundara Vathiyar and Chidambaram A. M. Nataraja Kavi. The film stars T. S. Durairaj, T. A. Jayalakshmi and E. R. Sahadevan. It revolves around the dispute between two goddesses over who is superior, and a farmer who they use to determine the answer. The film was released on 23 February 1951. It later served as an inspiration for the Tamil film Saraswathi Sabatham (1966).

== Plot ==
Saraswati is the goddess of knowledge and Lakshmi is the goddess of wealth. Both argue over who is superior, and use an illiterate farmer to determine the answer.

== Cast ==
- T. S. Durairaj as the farmer
- T. A. Jayalakshmi as the princess
- E. R. Sahadevan as the minister

== Production ==
Kalavathi was directed by L. S. Ramachandran who also wrote the screenplay based on a story by Chidambaram A. M. Nataraja Kavi and T. K. Sundara Vathiyar, and produced by Windsor Productions. Cinematography was handled by R. D. Mathur, and editing by N. P. Rathinam.

== Soundtrack ==
The soundtrack was composed by M. S. Gnanamani.

Song	Singer/s	Lyricist
"Kalviyai Pol Oru"	Kamala Bai	T. K. Sundara Vathiyar
"Maanamundu Mazhai Pozhiya"	T. S. Durairaj	T. K. Sundara Vathiyar
"Neeyilladhu Yaar Enakor"	A. P. Komala	T. K. Sundara Vathiyar
"Manivanna Kanna" (dance drama)	Pazhani Baheeradhi & M. S. Gnanamani	T. K. Sundara Vathiyar
"Ullasamaaga Vilaiyadalaame"	T. A. Jayalakshmi & A. P. Komala	T. K. Sundara Vathiyar
"Mannanukkinai Evare"		T. K. Sundara Vathiyar
"Ezhil Migum En Azhagile"	C. T. Rajakantham	T. K. Sundara Vathiyar
"Vinodhame Sangeetham Pol"	Kasthuri, K. S. Lakshmi & A. P. Komala	'Chidambaram' A. M. Nataraja Kavi
"Vidhiyaal Vilaindha Thunbamo"	T. A. Jayalakshmi & A. P. Komala	'Chidambaram' A. M. Nataraja Kavi
"Saaradha Mamani Neeye Gathi"	T. A. Jayalakshmi & A. P. Komala	'Chidambaram' A. M. Nataraja Kavi
"Namaste Adhi Namaste"	K. S. Ragam, Chandra, A. P. Komala & Lakshmi	'Chidambaram' A. M. Nataraja Kavi
"Ponnaana Bharatha Bhoomiyil"	Manigopal	M. S. Subramaniam
