= Kaliyugam (1952 film) =

- Directed by: V. S. Dhrupad
- Written by: (Dialogues) Viswanathan
- Screenplay by: Maheshvel
- Story by: Gordan Bai Merchant
- Produced by: Gordan Bai Merchant
- Starring: S. M. Kumaresan; B. S. Saroja; P. G. Venkatesan; M. M. Mariyappa
- Cinematography: Vasanth N. Bhuva
- Edited by: G. G. Basheer
- Music by: Vimalkumar
- Production company: Arunodaya Kala Mandir
- Release date: 3 November 1952
- Running time: 153 minutes
- Country: India
- Language: Tamil

Kaliyugam is a 1952 Indian, Tamil language film directed by V. S. Dhrupad. The film stars S. M. Kumaresan and B. S. Saroja. It was released on 3 November 1952.

== Cast ==
List adapted from the database of Film News Anandan.

Male cast

- S. M. Kumaresan
- P. G. Venatesan
- M. M. Mariyappa
- K. A. Thangavelu

Female cast

- B. S. Saroja
- S. Nandhini

== Production ==
The film was produced by Gordan Bai Merchant who also wrote the story on which the screenplay written by Maheshvel was based. The dialogues were written by Viswanathan. It was directed by V. S. Drupad. Cinematography was handled by Vasanth N. Bhuva and editing by G. G. Basheer. Hiralal Patel was in charge of art direction. Music was composed by Vimalkumar. The film was made at Srikanth Studios in Bombay.
