= Arumai Magal Abirami =

1959 film

- Poster
- Directed by: V. Krishnan
- Screenplay by: (Dialogues) V. Kalaimani
- Story by: V. Krishnan; K. Sriramachandran
- Produced by: V. Krishnan; S. V. Shanmugasundaram
- Starring: Prem Nazir; S. V. Sahasranamam; Rajasulochana; T. S. Durairaj
- Cinematography: C. Rajagopal
- Edited by: G. Venkataraman
- Music by: V. Dakshinamoorthy
- Production company: Aravind Pictures
- Release date: 29 November 1959
- Running time: 182 minutes
- Country: India
- Language: Tamil

Arumai Magal Abirami is a 1959 Indian Tamil-language film directed by V. Krishnan. The film stars Prem Nazir and Rajasulochana. It was released on 29 November 1959.

== Cast ==
The following list is adapted for the database of Film News Anandan

Male cast

- Prem Nazir
- S. V. Sahasranamam
- T. S. Durairaj
- Thevar
- Muthaiah

Female cast

- Rajasulochana
- Rajeswari
- Jayanthi
- Kamala
- Malathi
- Muthulakshmi
- Suryakala

== Production ==
The film was produced by V. Krishnan and S. V. Shanmugasundaram under the banner Aravind Pictures and was directed by V. Krishnan. The story was written by V. Krishnan and K. Ramachandran while the dialogues were penned by V. Kalaimani. C. Rajagopal handled the photography and the editing was done by G. Venkataraman. Art direction was by Chellaiah. Vembatti Sathyam, Rajkumar and P. S. Gopalakrishnan were in charge of choreography. Still photography was done by B. V. Venkatachalam and the film was processed at AVM laboratory.

== Soundtrack ==
Music was composed by V. Dakshinamoorthy.

Song	Singer/s	Lyricist
"Nalla Pillai Enru Solli Unnai"	R. Balasaraswathi Devi	A. Maruthakasi
"Ennamo Pannudhu"	K. Jamuna Rani	Ku. Sa. Krishnamoorthi
"Inai Solla Mudiyaadha Ezhiloviyam"	Sirkazhi Govindarajan	Ku. Sa. Krishnamoorthi
"Shankara Shankara Sambho"	S. V. Ponnusamy & group	Clown Sundaram
"Joraana Kattalagu Ponne"	K. Rani, A. G. Rathnamala	Clown Sundaram
"Paaru Paaru Paaru Sirippaaru"	K. Rani, A. G. Rathnamala	Thanjai N. Ramaiah Dass
"Thanga Niram Idhazh Sembavalam"	P. B. Srinivas, P. Susheela	Kuyilan
"Vettaikku Vandhanaiyaa"	P. Susheela	Kuyilan
"Manasukkup Pudichavaru Maappillai"	P. Susheela	A. S. Narayanan
"Theyn Thoyndha Sollile"	P. Leela	Lakshmanadas
"Dootti Dootti Dootti"	Thiruchi Loganathan, K. Jamuna Rani	
