= Paanai Pidithaval Bhaagyasaali =

1958 film by T. S. Durairaj

- Theatrical release poster
- Directed by: T. S. Durairaj
- Screenplay by: T. K. Sundara Vathiyar; Makkalanban
- Story by: Gangeyan
- Produced by: T. S. Durairaj
- Starring: Savitri; K. Balaji; T. S. Durairaj; P. S. Veerappa
- Cinematography: Kamal Ghosh
- Edited by: R. B. Natarajan
- Music by: S. V. Venkatraman; S. Rajeswara Rao
- Production company: Marakatha Pictures
- Release date: 10 January 1958
- Country: India
- Language: Tamil

Paanai Pidithaval Bhaagyasaali (transl. She who has the pot is lucky) is a 1958 Indian Tamil-language comedy film produced and directed by T. S. Durairaj, starring himself, Savitri, K. Balaji, T. P. Muthulakshmi, P. S. Veerappa and V. S. Raghavan. It was released on 10 January 1958.

== Plot ==
There is an illiterate and orphaned woman (Savitri) who was raised by her brother (Durairaj). She witnesses a thief (R. Nageswara Rao) raiding a wealthy man's house and committing two murders and he is after her. Savithri goes through numerous adventures involving various men but manages to escape all of them. She later meets a wealthy young man (Balaji) and falls in love with him. After many other incidents, she walks in helped by Durairaj and marries her lover who was originally set to marry another girl against his will.

== Cast ==
- T. S. Durairaj
- Savitri
- K. Balaji
- P. S. Veerappa
- V. S. Raghavan
- R. Nageswara Rao as the thief
- T. P. Muthulakshmi
- Saayiram
- Angamuthu
- T. N. Kamalam

== Production ==
Paanai Pidithaval Bhaagyasaali was produced and directed by T. S. Durairaj via his studio Marakatha Pictures, and he also starred as the male lead. Gangeyan was the writer. Shooting took place at many Madras studios such as Paramount, Revathi, Gemini and Majestic.

== Soundtrack ==
The music of the film was composed by S. V. Venkatraman and S. Rajeswara Rao. The song "Purushan Veetil Vaazha Pora Penney" performed by Loganathan was criticised by social activists for its seemingly misogynistic nature.

Song	Singers	Lyrics	Length
"Purushan Veetil Vaazha Pora Ponney"	Thiruchi Loganathan	T. K. Sundara Vathiyar	03:26
"Maancholai Thannile.... Aasai Mugam Maarinadho"	Jikki	T. K. Sundara Vathiyar	03:33
"Chaldhe Chaldhe Podaa"	T. M. Soundararajan	T. K. Sundara Vathiyar	02:24
"Thikku Theriyaadha Kaattil"	Jikki	Mahakavi Subramanya Bharathiyar	04:24
"Penne Unadhazhagai Kandu"	Thiruchi Loganathan & Jikki	Mahakavi Subramanya Bharathiyar	02:16
"Kannaa Vedan Engu Ponaan"	Jikki	Mahakavi Subramanya Bharathiyar	01:12
"Soalaikkulle Kuyilu Kunju"	Sirkazhi Govindarajan & P. Susheela	T. K. Sundara Vathiyar	03:28
"Ushaaru Ushaaru"	K. Rani & G. Kasthoori	T. K. Sundara Vathiyar	05:58
"Pachadikkettha Kichadi Sambaa"	Thiruchi Loganathan & T. V. Rathnam	Thanjai N. Ramaiah Dass	02:52

== Release and reception ==
Paanai Pidithaval Bhaagyasaali was released on 10 January 1958. The Indian Express said, "In [Paanai Pidithaval Bhaagyasaali], comedian Durairaj promotes himself to a producer and a competent director. The picture designed with economy of language, quickness of action and deftness of movement, makes an impression because of the skillfully woven plot, pleasing songs and lively antics." The Hindu wrote, "Good acting combined with pleasing and dance highlight Marakatha Pictures [Paanai Pidithaval Bhaagyasaali]. [Savitri] turns in a fine performance, so does [T. S. Durairaj]." According to historian Randor Guy, the film was not successful because of the "weak" screenplay and on-screen narration, but the music was its "redeeming feature".The story of this film only inspired the later film Navarathri
