= Vazha Pirandhaval =

1953 film by T. R. Ramanna

- Theatrical release poster
- Directed by: T. R. Ramanna
- Written by: Vindhan (dialogues)
- Story by: Simha
- Produced by: T. R. Ramanna
- Starring: T. R. Rajakumari; Sriram
- Cinematography: M. A. Rahman
- Edited by: M. S. Mani
- Music by: S. Rajeswara Rao; G. Ramanathan
- Production company: R. R. Pictures
- Distributed by: K. S. Pictures
- Release date: 10 April 1953
- Country: India
- Language: Tamil

Vazha Pirandhaval (transl. She was born to live) is a 1953 Indian Tamil-language film directed and produced by T. R. Ramanna in his directorial debut. The film stars T. R. Rajakumari and Sriram. It was released on 10 April 1953.

== Cast ==
Female cast

- T. R. Rajakumari
- B. S. Saroja
- M. Pandari Bai
- M. M. Radhabai
- K. S. Angamuthu
- K. Varalakshmi
- Baby Girija

Male cast

- Sriram
- T. S. Balaiah
- K. Sarangapani
- K. Duraisamy
- R. Balasubramaniam
- Chandrababu
- E. R. Sahadevan
- K. B. Jayaraman
- T. V. Sethuraman

== Production ==
Vazha Pirandhaval was produced and directed by T. R. Ramanna under the banner R. R. Pictures. The story was written by Simha and the dialogue by Vindhan. The music was composed by S. Rajeswara Rao and G. Ramanathan, while the lyrics were written by Ka. Mu. Sharif. The film was edited by M. S. Mani and processed at Gemini Studios. Its final length was more than 17,700 feet (5,400 m).

== Soundtrack ==
Music was composed by S. Rajeswara Rao and G. Ramanathan while all the lyrics were penned by Ka. Mu. Sheriff.

Song	Singer/s
"Aayi Lahaa Aayi Lahaa"	
"Chandiranai Polirukkumaa"	T. R. Rajakumari
"Cinema Kalaiyai Elidhaaga Enni"	J. P. Chandrababu
"Pengalin Thuyaram Indha Ulagil"	
"Inbathaale Pongudhe En Idhayam"	T. A. Mothi & P. Leela
"Vaazhvinile...Pala Maarudhal Thaan"	Jikki
"Vaazhvennum Uyar Nilaa Theyumo"	P. Leela
"Indhiya Naadu Nam Indhiya Naadu"	M. L. Vasanthakumari
"Vaazha Pirandhaval Naan"	T. R. Rajakumari, T. A. Mothi & P. Leela
