= Mangalyam =

- Theatrical release poster
- Directed by: K. Somu
- Written by: A. P. Nagarajan
- Produced by: M. A. Venu
- Starring: Naalvar Nagarajan; B. S. Saroja
- Cinematography: J. G. Vijayam
- Edited by: T. Vijayarangam
- Music by: K. V. Mahadevan
- Production company: M. A. V. Pictures
- Distributed by: Raja Films
- Release date: 11 June 1954
- Running time: 15,004 ft.
- Country: India
- Language: Tamil

Mangalyam (transl. Mangala sutra) is a 1954 Indian Tamil-language film directed by K. Somu and written by A. P. Nagarajan. The latter also stars (using the credit "Naalvar Nagarajan") alongside B. S. Saroja. The film was released on 11 June 1954.

== Plot ==
Kumar is a young and rich doctor who falls in love with the housemaid, Selvathaal. But his mother does not like their love affair and she chases away the housemaid. In the meantime, Kumar's sister falls in love with Kumar's friend Gopi. Selvathal becomes an actor with a new name, Manorama. Kumar and Gopi go in search of Selvathal. Another person is after the actor. He kidnaps her and places her in a hideout.

== Cast ==
Male cast

- Naalvar Nagarajan as Kumar
- M. N. Nambiar as Gopi
- S. A. Natarajan as Raja
- K. V. Srinivasan as Balu
- V. M. Ezhumalai as Va. Mu. Kazhugumalai
- A. Karunanidhi as Mani
- T. S. Loganathan as Mangalakaram Pillai
- K. N. Kaleswaran as Kalai
- S. R. Dasarathan as Groom

Male Support cast

- A. R. Dhamotharam, M. M. A. Chinnapa,
  N. P. Noor Mohammed, R. Sathyendran, P. S. Marimuthu,
  R. T. Kurunathan, C. R. Raju, and Gauthama Das.

Female cast

- B. S. Saroja as Selva
- P. R. Sulochana as Lakshmi
- S. Mohana as Nalina
- C. T. Rajakantham as Vadivambal
- P. S. Gnanam as Jagathambal
- Rushyendramani as Queen Mangammal
- P. Kanaka as Roopayi
- Vijayakumari as Bride

Female Support cast

- Shanthammal, Komathi

== Production ==
The film was produced by M. A. Venu under the banner M. A. V. Pictures. K. Somu directed the film. It was made at Central Studios Coimbatore.

== Soundtrack ==
Music was composed by K. V. Mahadevan.

| Song | Singers | Lyrics | Length |
| "Nalla Kaalam Porandhiduchu" | T. M. Soundararajan & group | Ka. Mu. Sheriff | 03:31 |
| "Vaazhvadhu Ponaalum" | T. M. Soundararajan | Ka. Mu. Sheriff | 02:00 |
| "Thottatthu Rojaa Malarndhadhu Raajaa" | Jikki | Ka. Mu. Sheriff | 03:21 |
| "Dhiname Unai Ninaindhu" | Jikki | Ka. Mu. Sheriff | 03:17 |
| "Ottumiru Ullanthanai Vettuvathu" | (Radha) Jayalakshmi | A. Maruthakasi | 02:32 |
| "Ninaitthaaley Inbam Tharum" | (Radha) Jayalakshmi | A. Maruthakasi | 02:55 |
| "Koojaa Koojaa" | T. M. Soundararajan & K. R. Sellamuthu | A. Maruthakasi | 02:52 |

== Reception ==
The Hindu wrote, "Nagarajan, in the leading role, gives a performance beautiful in its delicacy. The playing in general is impressive".
