= S. D. S. Yogi =

S. D. Subramania Yogi
- ச. து. சுப்பிரமணிய யோகி
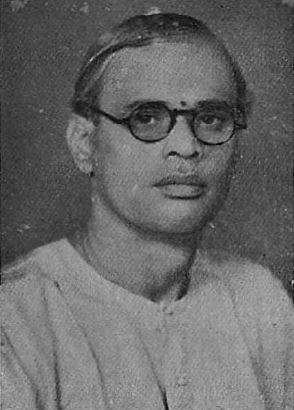
- S. D. S. Yogi in 1953
- Born: Subramaniyan; 30 November 1904; Elappally, Northern Division, Kingdom of Travancore, British India (now in Idukki district, Kerala, India)
- Died: 27 July 1963 (aged 58)
- Known for: director, playwright, poet
- Spouse: Kamalambal (m. 1925)

S. D. Subramania Yogi (30 November 1904 – 27 July 1963) was a Tamil director, playwright, screenplay writer and poet from Tamil Nadu, India.

== Life ==
He was born on 30 November 1904 into a family of poets in Elappally, a village near Thodupuzha in present-day Idukki district of Kerala. He published his first collection of poems, while still a student at the Erode Mahajana High School in 1924. He became involved in the Indian Independence Movement and wrote many poems in support of the Indian nationalist cause. He was given the title "Bhala Bharathi" in appreciation of his Tamil literary skills. Among his noted works are Bhavani Kuravanji, a translation of Omar Khayyam's works into Tamil and the life stories of Mary Magdalene and Ahalya.

After becoming well known in the field of literature, Yogi started writing scripts for Tamil films. His first film as script writer - Iru Sahodarargal (1936) was a success and the literary magazine Manikodi praised him for his dialogues. He went on to write scripts and song lyrics for a number of Tamil films till the 1950s. He also directed two films - Adrishtam (1939) and Krishnakumar (1941). Yogi translated many of film related English technical terms into Tamil and published a model screenplay using the terms in the magazine Gundoosi.

In 2000, the Government of Tamil Nadu nationalised his works.

== Filmography ==
As script writer

- Iru Sahodarargal (1936)
- Krishnabakthi (1948)
- Lakshmi (1953)

As director

- Adrishtam (1939)
- Krishnakumar (1941)
