= Anbu (1953 film) =

1953 film

- Theatrical release poster
- Directed by: M. Natesan
- Screenplay by: Vindhan (dialogues)
- Story by: M. Natesan
- Produced by: M. Natesan
- Starring: Sivaji Ganesan; T. R. Rajakumari; Padmini
- Cinematography: Jithan Banerjee (Supervising); G. Vittal Rao
- Edited by: S. A. Murugesan
- Music by: T. R. Pappa
- Production company: Natesh Art Pictures
- Distributed by: Natesh Art Pictures
- Release date: 24 July 1953
- Running time: 178 minutes
- Country: India
- Language: Tamil

Anbu (transl. Affection) is a 1953 Indian Tamil-language drama film produced and directed by M. Natesan. The film stars Sivaji Ganesan, T. R. Rajakumari and Padmini. It was released on 24 July 1953.

== Plot ==
Thangam, a young woman, is married to a much older man, Rajamanickam Mudaliar. He has two children from his first marriage: a daughter Lakshmi, and a son, Selvam. Mudaliar dies when Thangam is pregnant with his child. Selvam falls in love with a rich girl Malathi while Thirumalai, a playboy, tries to separate them. When the widowed Thangam's child is born, Lakshmi spreads rumours that Selvam is the father of the child, and had an incestuous relationship with Thangam. Malathi believes these rumours and begins to torment Thangam. How Thangam surmounts the problems forms the rest of the story.

== Cast ==
Male cast

- Sivaji Ganesan as Selvam
- T. S. Balaiah as Thirumalai
- D. Duraisami as Rajamanikkam
- K. Thangavelu as Kumar
- Friend K. Ramasami as Bhaskar

Support cast

- Kumari Rajam, Adilakshmi, Rita,
  Mohana, and Saraswathi.

Female cast

- T. R. Rajakumari as Thangam
- Padmini as Malathi
- Lalitha as Reeta
- M. Rushyendramani as Vijaya
- T. S. Jaya as Balamani
- S. Padma as Lakshmi

== Production ==
Anbu was produced and directed by M. Natesan under his company Natesh Art Pictures. The story was written by him, and the dialogues by Vindhan. Cinematography was handled by G. Vittal Rao, editing by S. A. Murugesan, and the choreography by P. S. Gopalakrishnan, K. N. Dandayudhapani Pillai and B. Heeralal. Shooting took place at Newtone and Citadel studios.

== Soundtrack ==
The music was composed by T. R. Pappa.

Song	Singers	Lyrics	Length
"Enna Enna Inbame"	A. M. Rajah & Jikki	Ka. Mu. Sheriff	03:33
"Anbe Dheiveegam.... Anbaale Ulagil"	T. R. Rajakumari	Rajappa	03:23
"Aadavargale Naattile"	A. M. Rajah & M. L. Vasanthakumari	Suratha	02:53
"Aiyaa Mudhalaali Vaanga"	A. M. Rajah	Ka. Mu. Sheriff	02:47
"Manam Naadum Dheivam Neeye"	Jikki	Ka. Mu. Sheriff	02:49
"Onnum Puriyavillai Thambi"	A. M. Rajah	Vindhan	01:11
"Isaippaadi Vaazhvinba Suvai Kaanuvom"	M. L. Vasanthakumari	Kambadasan	02:40
"Vendhazhalaai Erikkum Venmadhiye"	N. L. Ganasaraswathi & A. P. Komala	Dandapani	05:48
"Vaanin Nilave.... Vaanam Sendraayo"	A. M. Rajah	Kambadasan	03:08
"Kappadhu Un Paramamma"	T. R. Rajakumari	Papanasam Sivan	
"Manadhu Magizhave Manamum"	T. R. Rajakumari	Ka. Mu. Sheriff	03:05

== Release and reception ==
Anbu was released on 24 July 1953. Natesh Art Pictures distributed the film themselves in Madras and select regions, while others did so for other regions in Tamil Nadu. Kumudam, a Tamil weekly published the review of this film in a unique way. It was written as such, the characters in the film were telling about their roles. This prompted Natesan to go for a defamation case against the weekly. However, the legal adviser of the weekly settled the matter amicably with Natesan. The film was dubbed into Telugu with the title Apeksha.
