= Bhavani (1967 film) =

- Theatrical release poster
- Directed by: T. R. Ramanna
- Written by: K. S. Gopalakrishnan
- Produced by: D. K. Shankar
- Starring: Jaishankar; Vijayakumari
- Cinematography: G. Durai
- Edited by: D. K. Shankar
- Music by: M. S. Viswanathan
- Production company: Anna Productions
- Distributed by: Eveyaar Films
- Release date: 5 August 1967
- Country: India
- Language: Tamil

Bhavani (/bəvɑːni/) is a 1967 Indian Tamil-language film directed by T. R. Ramanna and written by K. S. Gopalakrishnan. It was produced by D. K. Shankar of Anna Productions, who doubled as editor. The film stars Jaishankar and Vijayakumari. It was released on 5 August 1967.

== Cast ==
Male cast

- Jaishankar
- S. A. Ashokan
- Nagesh
- Sundarrajan

Female cast

- Vijayakumari
- L. Vijayalakshmi
- Vanisri
- M. V. Rajamma
- Manorama

== Soundtrack ==
The soundtrack was composed by M. S. Viswanathan, with lyrics by Kannadasan.

Track listing
No.	Title	Singer(s)	Length
1.	"Intha Nilavai Naan Paarthal"	T. M. Soundararajan, P. Susheela, L. R. Eswari, P. B. Sreenivas
2.	"Malligai Hoi Manvizhi"	L. R. Eswari
3.	"Naan Paadum Paattile"	P. Susheela
4.	"Punnagaiyil Oru Porul"	T. M. Soundararajan
5.	"Vayathu Vantha Pengal"	L. R. Eswari
6.	"Saapidathan theriyum"	A.L.Raghavan

== Release and reception ==
Bhavani was released on 5 August 1967, and distributed by Eveyaar Films. Kalki gave the film a negative review, criticising its stage play-like feel.
