= Adrishtam =

1939 film by S. D. S. Yogi

- Poster
- Directed by: S. D. S. Yogi
- Written by: S. D. S. Yogi
- Starring: T. Suryakumari; K. R. Chellam
- Music by: Sarma Brothers
- Production company: Mayura Films
- Release date: 1939
- Country: India
- Language: Tamil

Adrishtam (transl. Luck) is a 1939 Indian Tamil-language film written and directed by S. D. S. Yogi. The film stars T. Suryakumari and K. R. Chellam, with T. S. Damayanthi, Sakunthala, V. V. Satagopan, Kothamangalam Subbu and M. N. Srinivasan in supporting roles.

== Plot ==
A young heiress is kidnapped over property disputes, and circumstances force her to begin roaming the streets of Madras. A lady lawyer later fights for her and such events.

== Cast ==
Adapted from the pressbook:

- T. Suryakumari as Surya
- K. R. Chellam as Thangam
- T. S. Damayanthi as Swarnam
- Sakunthala as Rakkayi
- V. V. Satagopan as Lingam
- Kothamangalam Subbu as Jambu
- M. N. Srinivasan as Lawyer Somanath
- K. R. Krishna Iyer as the assistant
- C. Panju as Rakkan
- V. S. Kittappa as the public prosecutor
- Rm. Meiyyappa as the Marwadi
- Ganapathi Bhatt as the sub-inspector
- Rangachariyar as the judge
- T. S. Thyagarajan as Thyagu
- V. Azhagappan as Azhagu

== Production ==
Adrishtam was written and directed by S. D. S. Yogi, and produced under Mayura Films. Parts of the song "Ayya Siru Penn", composed by the Sarma Brothers, written by Yogi and sung by Suryakumari, were filmed at the now non-existent Moore Market in Madras.

== Release and reception ==
Adrishtam was released in 1939. The film's poster was publicised upside down in a magazine. Although readers wrote to the editor questioning the apparent error, the editor later in the next isse that it was an intentional choice to attract more attention. According to historian Randor Guy, the Censor Board edited out many scenes such as those where Chellam's lawyer character asks a woman in court "highly embarrassing and intimate" questions, thereby "damaging the film" in the process. Despite this, the film was well received by audiences, and Suryakumari became a household name in Tamil through this film along with Vipra Narayana and Ambikapathy (both 1937).
