= Iru Sahodarargal =

1936 film by Ellis R. Dungan

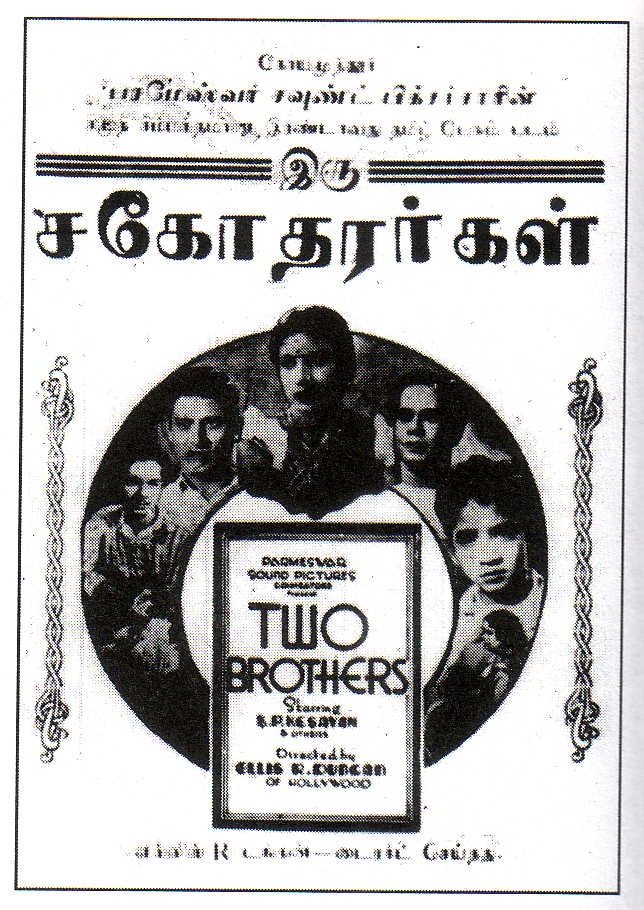
- Theatrical release poster
- Directed by: Ellis R. Dungan
- Written by: S. D. S. Yogi
- Produced by: Parameshwar Sound Pictures
- Starring: K. P. Kesavan; M. M. Radhabai; M. G. Ramachandran; T. S. Krishnaveni; T. S. Balaiya; P. G. Venkatesan
- Music by: Anantharaman; Gopalaswami
- Release date: 1936
- Language: Tamil

Iru Sahodarargal (also spelled as Iru Sakodarargal; transl. Two Brothers) is a 1936 Indian Tamil-language drama film directed by Ellis R. Dungan. This was the second film for M. G. Ramachandran (later Chief Minister of Tamil Nadu) and Dungan. This film cemented the reputation of Dungan as the most successful Tamil film director of that period. It is one of the earliest Tamil films to be set in a contemporary social setting. No print of the film is known to survive, making it a lost film.

== Plot ==
Vijayakumar and Sukumar (K. P. Kesavan) are brothers. Sukumar, the younger brother is an actor and goes to Madras to earn a living. There he gets a break and becomes famous. The money he sends for his family's upkeep is stolen by Vijayakumar and his wife. Because of their greed, the joint family gets split. After some time, the wayward brother and sister-in-law have a change of heart and repent for their actions. The family is once again reunited.

== Cast and crew ==
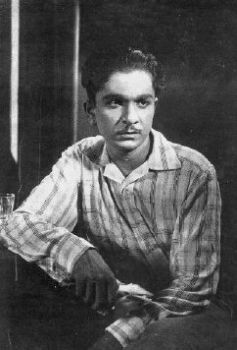
P. K. Kesavan

- P. K. Kesavan — Sukumar
- K. K. Perumal
- M. M. Radhabai
- T. S. Krishnaveni
- T. S. Balaiah
- S. N. Vijayalakshmi
- P. G. Venkatesan
- S. N. Kannamani
- M. G. Ramachandran
- M. G. Chakrapani
- Ellis R. Dungan – Director
- S. D. S. Yogi- Story, Screenplay and Lyrics
- Parur S Anantharaman — Music
- Gopalaswami — Music
- S. K. Murthy — Art Direction

== Production ==
Iru Sahodarargal was produced by Parameshwaran Chettiar of Coimbatore under the banner of Parameshwar Sound Pictures. It was shot at Saroj Movietone studios at Bombay. This was the second film for Dungan after Sathi Leelavathi (1935). K. P. Kesavan, a stage actor, was cast as hero. M. G. Ramachandran (credited as G. Ramachandran) was cast as a policeman along with his brother M. G. Chakrapani. Dungan cast seventy-year-old Alamelu Ammal to play the role of the grandmother to lend realism to the role. The screenplay and lyrics were written by Tamil scholar and poet S.D.S. Yogi.

== Reception ==
The film was released in 1936 at the Elphinstone Cinema House, Madras. It was a modest box office success. It was one of the earliest Tamil films to have a family oriented story. The art magazine Aadal paadal in its January 1937 issue appreciated the film for its social setting and pointed it out as an example for the success of social themed films. Congress leader S. Satyamurti arranged a special screening for Rajaji at the Elphinstone theatre. Rajaji was impressed by the film and appreciated it. The proceeds of the show he attended were donated to the Patel Purse Fund to finance the nationalist cause. Reviewing the film in Ananda Vikatan on 3 January 1937, Kalki Krishnamurthy wrote :

This talkie does not have any titillating scenes; or high paid stars; or good quality music; There are no crumbling mountains, burning seas and erupting skies. There are no breath taking scenes at all. Even without all these, this movie is a success because of the director's skill and the cast's acting talent. After seeing this movie, we can be assured about the future growth of arts in Tamil Nadu.
