= T. R. Ramanna =

Indian director

- Born: Thanjavur Radhakrishnan Ramachandran; 01 January 1923; Thanjavur, Madras Presidency, British India
- Died: 22 May 1997 (Age 74); Chennai, Tamil Nadu, India
- Spouses: E. V. Saroja
- Family: T. S. Damayanthi (Sister)T. D. Kushalakumari (niece)T. R. Rajakumari (elder sister)

Thanjavur Radhakrishnan Ramachandran (T.R.Ramanna) (1923–1997) was an Indian film director and producer.

== Film career ==
Ramanna started his career as a sound recordist in a city studio and then made his way to film direction. He started the production company R.R. Pictures (with the initials of his sister and himself). He produced movies in Tamil, Telugu and Hindi, many of which were successful.

One of his successful film was Manapandhal, inspired by the Hollywood classic Sabrina (1954), directed by Billy Wilder and starring Humphrey Bogart, William Holden and Audrey Hepburn.

== Filmography ==
Year	Film	Credited as		Language	Notes
Year	Film	Director	Producer	Language	Notes
1953	Vazha Pirandhaval	✓	✓	Tamil	
1954	Koondukkili	✓	✓	Tamil	
1955	Gulebakavali	✓	✓	Tamil	
1957	Pudhumai Pithan	✓	✗	Tamil	
1958	Karthavarayuni Katha	✓	✓	Telugu	
1958	Kathavarayan	✓	✓	Tamil	
1960	Rathnapuri Ilavarasi	✓	Question	Tamil	
1960	Ondrupattal Undu Vazhvu	✓	✗	Tamil	
1961	Manapanthal	✗	✓	Tamil	
1961	Intiki Deepam Illale	✗	✓	Telugu	
1961	Sri Valli	✓	✗	Tamil	
1962	Paasam	✓	✓	Tamil	
1963	Periya Idathu Penn	✓	✓	Tamil	
1963	Manchi Chedu	✓	✓	Telugu	
1964	Panakkara Kudumbam	✓	✓	Tamil	
1964	Arunagirinathar	✓	✗	Tamil	
1965	Panam Padaithavan	✓	✓	Tamil	
1965	Nee!	✓	✗	Tamil	
1966	Kumari Penn	✓	✗	Tamil	
1966	Parakkum Pavai	✓	✓	Tamil	
1967	Bhavani	✓	✗	Tamil	
1967	Naan	✓	✗	Tamil	
1968	Moondrezhuthu	✓	✗	Tamil	
1968	Neeyum Naanum	✓	Question	Tamil	25th Film
1969	Athai Magal	✓	✗	Tamil	
1969	Thanga Surangam	✓	✗	Tamil	
1969	Waris	✓	✗	Hindi	
1969	Thulabharam	✗	✓	Tamil	
1970	Yaen?	✓	✗	Tamil	
1970	Sorgam	✓	✗	Tamil	
1971	Lagan	✓	Question	Hindi	
1971	Veettukku Oru Pillai	✓	Question	Tamil	
1972	Wafaa	✓	Question	Hindi	
1972	Shakthi Leelai	✓	✗	Tamil	
1972	Aankh Micholi	✓	Question	Hindi	
1973	Baghdad Perazhagi	✓	✓	Tamil	
1973	Maru Piravi	✓	✗	Tamil	
1974	Vairam	✓	✗	Tamil	.
1974	Sorgathil Thirumanam	✓	Question	Tamil	
1975	Avalukku Aayiram Kangal	✓	Question	Tamil	
1976	Tuhi Kali Tuhi Durga	✓	Question	Hindi	
1977	Thaliya Salangaya	✓	Question	Tamil	
1978	Farz Aur Khoon	✓	Question	Hindi	
1978	Ennai Pol Oruvan	✓	✗	Tamil	
1978	Bhale Huduga	✓	✓	Kannada	
1978	Siritanakke Savaal	✓	✗	Kannada	
1979	Kuppathu Raja	✓	✗	Tamil	
1979	Neechal Kulam	✓	Question	Tamil	
1979	Yuvaraj	✓	Question	Hindi	
1981	Kanni Theevu	✓	Question	Tamil	
1981	Kulakozhunthu	✓	Question	Tamil	
1981	Kula Puthra	✓	Question	Kannada	
1982	Sattam Sirikkiradhu	✓	✗	Tamil	50th Film
1984	Shankari	✓	Question	Tamil	
1987	Elangeswaran	✓	Question	Tamil	
