= Elappally =

- village
- Location in Kerala, India Elappally (India)
- Coordinates: 9°47′0″N 76°51′0″E
- Country: India
- State: Kerala
- District: Idukki
- Taluk: Thodupuzha

Population (2011)
  - Total: 4,320

Languages
  - Official: Malayalam
- Time zone: UTC+5:30 (IST)
- PIN: 685589
- Telephone code: 04862
- Vehicle registration: KL- 38
- Nearest city: Thodupuzha
- Lok Sabha constituency: Idukki
- Vidhan Sabha constituency: Idukki
- Climate: Moderate (Köppen)

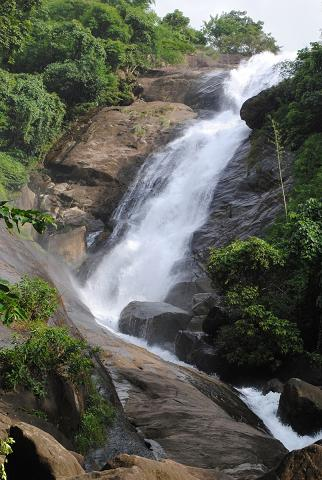
Elappally Waterfall

Elappally is a village in Thodupuzha Taluk, Idukki district in Kerala, India. It is located 26 km from Thodupuzha, 85 km from Kochi, and 70 km from Kottayam.

The Elappally Falls are situated near Moolamattom Wagamon road, which originates in the upper reaches of the Western Ghats. It is most active during the monsoon season.

== Nearest airports ==
- Kochi International Airport

== Nearest railway stations ==
- Thripponithura -TRTR
- Ernakulam Junction (Ernakulam South)
- ERS, Ernakulam Town (Ernakulam North)
- ERN, Aluva
- AWY and Kottayam
- KTYM

== Demographics ==
As of 2011 India census, Elappally had a population of 4320 with 2186 males and 2134 females.

== Religious institutions ==
- St.Luke's C S I Church, Elappally
- St.Mary's Church, Elappally
- Sree Dharma Sastha Temple, Elappally
- IPC Hebron Church, Elappally
