= Pudhumai Pithan (1957 film) =

- Poster
- Directed by: T. R. Ramanna
- Written by: M. Karunanidhi
- Produced by: K. Muniratnam
- Starring: M. G. Ramachandran; T. R. Rajakumari; B. S. Saroja
- Cinematography: G. K. Ramu
- Edited by: R. Devarajan
- Music by: G. Ramanathan
- Production company: Sivakami Pictures
- Release date: 2 August 1957
- Running time: 176 minutes
- Country: India
- Language: Tamil

Pudhumai Pithan is a 1957 Indian Tamil-language film directed by T. R. Ramanna and written by M. Karunanidhi, starring M. G. Ramachandran, T. R. Rajakumari and B. S. Saroja. The film was released on 2 August 1957.

== Plot ==
A king is imprisoned by his ambitious brother, who creates the impression that the king had died while out hunting. The crown prince who was on a sea journey returns to attend the king's fake funeral. During the funeral, the crown prince discovers the truth, via a secret message conveyed to him by the palace physician's daughter, who falls in love with the prince. The king's sibling also plots to kill the prince by poisoning him with a drug, concocted by the palace physician. The drug was supposed to make the crown prince mad, who acts like a madman poisoned by the drug to fool everyone. The prince is also helped by a woman drama troupe leader, who also had affection to the crown prince. Eventually, she sacrifices her life, leaving the prince to unite with the daughter of the palace physician. The plotting villains were avenged by the prince and his comedian sidekick.

== Cast ==
Cast according to the opening credits

Male cast

- M. G. Ramachandran as Jeevagan
- T. S. Balaiah as Prathapan
- J. P. Chandrababu as Arivumani
- E. R. Sahadevan as Parakraman
- R. Balasubramaniam as Dhunmuki
- C. S. Pandian as Chitraguptan
- P. S. Venkatachalam as Veeraiah
- C. V. V. Panthulu as Emperor
- C.R.Parthibhan as Nallannan (Brother of Inbavalli)

Female cast

- T. R. Rajakumari as Inbavalli
- B. S. Saroja as Velvizhi
- E. V. Saroja as Aprajitha
- K. S. Angamuthu as Poonkodi

Supporting cast

- Shantha, Rita, Jayanthi, Kamala, Vitto Bai, Shanthi, Chandra, Bala, Thara, Mohana, Janaki, Saroja, Rajeswari, Rukkumani, Leela, Ranganayaki, Saraswathi and Prema.

== Production ==
The film was directed by Ramanna and it was produced by K. Muniratnam under the banner Sivakami Pictures. The film's script was written by M. Karunanidhi and the cinematography was handled by G. Ramu. According to historian M. L. Narasimham, it was partly inspired by William Shakespeare's Hamlet.

== Soundtrack ==
The music was composed by G. Ramanathan. All lyrics were by Thanjai N. Ramaiah Dass.

Song	Singers	Length
"Aiyya Yaarukku Venum"	A. G. Rathnamala	03:30
"Azhagai Paar"	Jikki	03:10
"Manamohanaa"	P. Leela	03:36
"Ullam Rendum"	C. S. Jayaraman & Jikki	03:20
"Maamannar Andha"	A. G. Rathnamala	01:20
"Kanavaa Ninaivaa"	Jikki	03:42
"Maaraadha Soozhchi"	Sirkazhi Govindarajan	01:54
"Aaraichi Mani...Thillana Pattu Paadi"	J. P. Chandrababu & Jikki	03:52
"Then Madhuvai Vandinam"	P. Susheela	04:11
"Melam Kotti Thaali Katti"	C. S. Jayaraman	03:47
"Karumbum Erumbum...Maane Un Mel"	C. S. Jayaraman	01:45
"Pittham Theliya Marundhonrikkudhu"	C. S. Jayaraman	01:03
"Yaaradi Nee Ingu Vandhaval"	C. S. Jayaraman	01:36
"Naadhar Mudi Mel Irukkum"	M. G. Ramachandran	02:22

== Reception ==
Kanthan of Kalki wrote, this movie seems to be an album of MGR's various photo shots. Historian Randor Guy opined that the film failed to click in box office during its first release, due the "predictable storyline".
