= Sri Aandal =

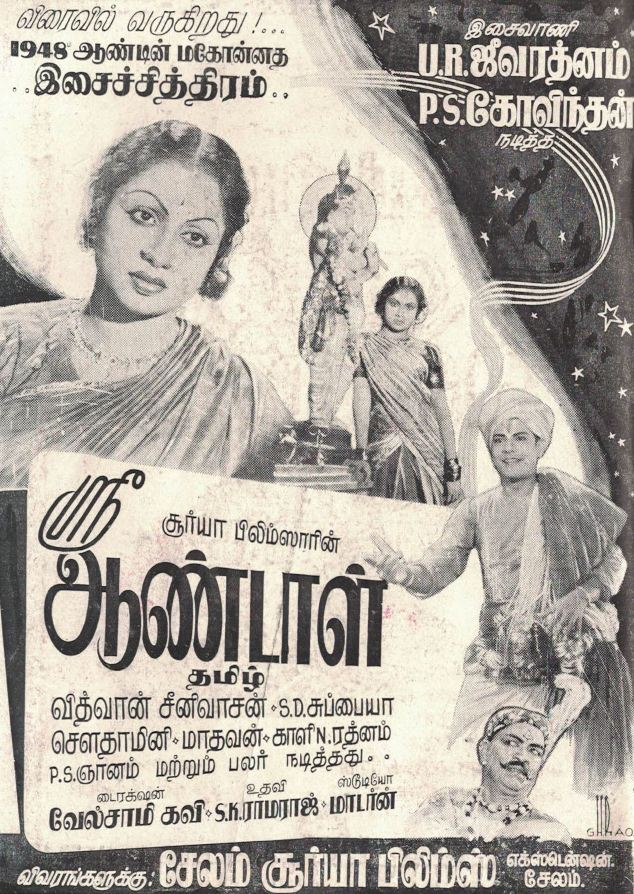
- Poster
- Directed by: S. Velsamy Kavi
- Written by: Madhivanan
- Starring: U. R. Jeevarathnam; P. S. Govindan
- Cinematography: J. G. Vijayam
- Edited by: G. Srihari
- Music by: G. Ramanathan
- Production company: Salem Surya Movies
- Release date: 1948
- Country: India
- Language: Tamil

Sri Aandal is a 1948 Indian Tamil-language Hindu mythological film directed by Velsamy Kavi. Based on Andal, it stars U. R. Jeevarathnam as the title character and P. S. Govindan. The film was reasonably successful, but no print of it is known to survive, making it a lost film.

== Cast ==
- U. R. Jeevarathnam as Andal
- P. S. Govindan as Kannan
- 'Vidwan' Sreenivasan as Vishnuchithan
- S. D. Subbaiah
- G. Sowdhamini
- Kali N. Rathnam
- S. Subbulakshmi
- 'Kumari' Selvam
- P. S. Gnanam
- P. K. Madhavan
- V. M. Ezhumalai

== Production ==
Sri Aandal was directed by Velsamy Kavi and produced by Salem Surya Movies, a subsidiary of Modern Theatres. It was the first film for J. G. Vijayam as an independent cinematographer, while G. Srihari was the editor and Madhivannan wrote the dialogues. Sri Aandal was to have been the debut film for S. S. Rajendran as an actor. He received an offer to act in a negative role, and an advance as well. However, T. R. Sundaram, who oversaw the production, overruled Rajendran's selection because he "appeared like a boy with curly hair and was unsuitable for the villain role."

== Soundtrack ==
The soundtrack was composed by G. Ramanathan and the lyrics were penned by Shuddhananda Bharati. After Rajendran was unsuccessful in securing a role in the film, he pleaded with Sundaram that he could sing well. Thus Ramanathan offered him an opportunity to sing a song, which was "Inba Ulaginile Manmadha Poonganai". Sri Aandal thus marked Rajendran's singing debut.

Song	Singer	Length
"Anbu Kadalinile Vennilaave"	U. R. Jeevarathnam	03:36
"Un Arulil Anbu Vaitthen Kannaa"	U. R. Jeevarathnam	02:55
"Karpooran Maarumo"	U. R. Jeevarathnam	03:14
"Inba Ulagile Manmadhan Poonganai"	S. S. Rajendran & G. Saudhamini	02:35
"Maargazhi Thirunaal"	U. R. Jeevarathnam	03:02
"Mana Mohana"	P. S. Govindan & U. R. Jeevarathnam	03:15
"Jebmamellaam Undhan"	U. R. Jeevarathnam	03:01
"Vaaraadho Karunai Kannaa"	U. R. Jeevarathnam	02:54
"Solaiyile Oru Naal Ennaiye"	U. R. Jeevarathnam	03:15
"Ithanai Naal Varaikkum Ennai Thaniye Vittu"	Kali N. Rathnam & S. Subbulakshmi	02:34
"Valaiyal Nalla Valaiyal "	P. S. Govindan	02:59
"Seettik Kombu Maadugala"	P. S. Govindan	01:51

== Reception ==
The film was reasonably successful, but no print of it is known to survive, making it a lost film.
