= Sanyasi-Samsari =

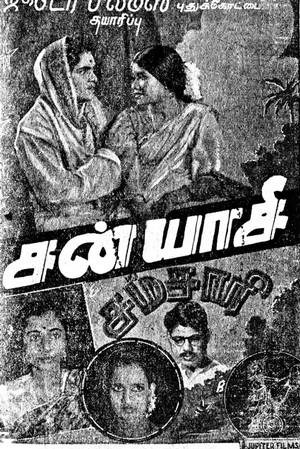
- Poster
- Directed by: M. Krishnaratnam
- Written by: Samsari: Gavai Sathasivam; Sanyasi: K. Hirnayya
- Music by: Samsari: Nataraja Achari; Sanyasi: M. S. Gnanamani
- Production company: Jupiter Films
- Release date: 1942
- Country: India
- Language: Tamil

Sanyasi-Samsari is a 1942 Indian Tamil-language film directed by M. Krishnaratnam. Sanyasi (transl. Ascetic) and Samsari (transl. Patriarch) are two separate films packaged into one and released together.

== Plot ==
Sanyasi

It is a story of a crook who is also a robber. He sets his eyes on a beautiful woman, Seetha who is Rajaram's wife. Rajaram seeks financial help from the crook to educate his son. The crook abducts Seetha but Seetha is saved by another woman. The rest of the story is how the problems are eventually solved.

Samsari

A native doctor is of the firm belief that native Indian medicine is the best. He wants to get a groom for the elder of his two daughters, Gunavathi and Gowri. He wants the groom to be a good native physician. He finds one, Kulapathi, who is also qualified in western medicine. The native doctor's brother-in-law claims his right to marry Gunavathi. So the native doctor sets a condition saying whoever finds the old system of medicine called Muppu can marry his daughter. The B-I-L steals the document from the native doctor but the younger daughter Gowri takes it back. How the problem is solved forms the rest of the story.

== Cast ==
Credits adapted from The Hindu.

Sanyasi

- P. A. Kumar
- P. G. Venkatesan
- M. L. Pathi
- C. S. D.Singh
- Kottapuli Jayaram
- P. S. Gnanam
- P. R. Mangalam
- T. S. Jaya
- Loose Arumugam
- Master Thangavel
- M. V. Swaminathan
- Kumari Selva

Samsari

- Gavai Sathasivam
- P. T. Ram
- Puthukottai S. Rukmani
- Vikatakavi Mariyappa
- T. K. Ranjitham
- K. Varalakshmi
- K. Rajalakshmi
- T. A. Rajeswari
- M. Natanam
- T. S. Lokanathan
- P. S. B. Thondaiman

== Production ==
The film was produced by Jupiter Films, a company that was based in Pudukkottai. During the early decades it was a trend to package two or more films into one and release together. In 1939, five different comedy films were packaged into one and released under the title Sirikkadhe (transl. Don't Laugh).

== Soundtrack ==
Sanyasi: Music was composed by M. S. Gnanam
Samsari: Music was composed by Nataraja Achari

== Reception ==
The films fared well at the box office and remembered for the "pleasing music and good acting by the veterans."
