= Paasam =

1962 film by T. R. Ramanna

- Theatrical release poster
- Directed by: T. R. Ramanna
- Story by: 'Thuraiyoor' K. Murthy
- Produced by: T. R. Ramanna
- Starring: M. G. Ramachandran; Kalyan Kumar; B. Saroja Devi
- Cinematography: M. A. Rahman
- Edited by: R. Rajagopal
- Music by: Viswanathan–Ramamoorthy
- Production company: R. R. Pictures
- Distributed by: Emgeeyaar Pictures
- Release date: 31 August 1962
- Running time: 158 minutes
- Country: India
- Language: Tamil

Paasam (transl. Affection) is a 1962 Indian Tamil-language film directed by T. R. Ramanna. The film stars M. G. Ramachandran, Kalyan Kumar and B. Saroja Devi. It was released on 31 August 1962 and failed commercially.

== Plot ==
The story depicts the extraordinary love of a son towards his mother. Gopi is brought up in a juvenile home, as he accidentally commits a murder. After his release he searches for his mother and brother, but is unable to trace them. He lands in the same village, where his brother Raghu lives and works as a government officer. He falls in love with his friend Kali's sister, Chandra, but Kali refuses the alliance, accusing him of being an orphan. Raghu and Chandra are to be engaged. Angry at being thwarted and not knowing that Raghu is his brother, he joins Swaminathan in trying to trap Raghu in a burglary case. Ironically, both Raghu and Gopi do not know the true identity of Swaminathan. It is he who had thrown away his wife Shanta, their mother, several years ago. Several truths are revealed when Gopi meets his mother face to face. Is he able to set things right?

== Cast ==
- M. G. Ramachandran as Gopi
- Kalyan Kumar as Raghu
- B. Saroja Devi as Manju
- Sheeladevi as Chandra
- T. R. Rajakumari as Shantha
- M. R. Radha as Swaminathan
- Ashokan as Kali
- T. R. Ramachandran as sadaiyan (Swaminathan's servant)
- S. N. Lakshmi as Meenakshi
- C. K. Saraswathi as Swaminathan's sister
- Lakshmi Rajyam as Bakkiyam
- 'Kottapuli' Jayaraman as Iyer
- Kannaiah as Swaminathan's sidekick
- Soundar as Mayandi

== Soundtrack ==
The music was composed by Viswanathan–Ramamoorthy and lyrics were written by Kannadasan.

Song	Singers	Length
"Jal Jal Jal Enum Salangai"	S. Janaki	03:41
"Pal Vannam Paruvam"	P. B. Sreenivas, P. Susheela	03:48
"Maalaiyum Iravum"	P. B. Sreenivas, S. Janaki	03:26
"Therathu Silaiyethu"	P. Susheela	03:16
"Ulagam Pirandhadhu Enakkaga"	T. M. Soundararajan	03:41
"Uravu Solla Oruvarindri"	P. Susheela	04:29
"Vengaikku Kurivaithu"	Sirkazhi Govindarajan	04:04

== Release and reception ==
Paasam was released on 31 August 1962, and distributed by Emgeeyaar Pictures in Madras, delayed from a 24 August release. The film failed commercially because fans of Ramachandran could not digest seeing his character dying and considered it anticlimactic. Ramanna received hundreds of letters from fans condemning him. He said the film's ending not only made him understand the actor's dominance, "but also that one could not say things that are in contradiction with people's sentiments".

== Bibliography ==
- Kannan, R. (28 June 2017). MGR: A Life. India: Penguin Random House. ISBN 978-93-86495-88-4.
- Vaasanthi (2008). Cut-outs, Caste and Cines Stars. Penguin Books. ISBN 978-0-14-306312-4.
