= Surya Puthri =

1941 film by Ellis R. Dungan

- Theatrical poster
- Directed by: Ellis R. Dungan
- Screenplay by: Kothamangalam Subbu (Dialogues
- Story by: K. S. Gopalakrishnan (Note: Not K. S. Gopalakrishnan)
- Starring: T. R. Rajakumari; Kothamangalam Subbu; K. R. Chellam; Sundari Bai; S. R. Janaki
- Cinematography: Sailen Bose, Kamal Ghosh
- Music by: V. S. Parthasarathi Ayyangar
- Production company: Baskar Pictures
- Release date: 25 January 1941
- Country: India
- Language: Tamil

Surya Puthri (transl. Daughter of the Sun) is a 1941 Indian Hindu mythological film, directed by Ellis R. Dungan and associate J. Moylan. The film stars Kothamangalam Subbu, Kothamangalam Seenu and K. R. Chellam. Co-starring were T. R. Rajakumari, M. S. Sundari Bai and S. R. Janaki.

== Plot ==
On a festival day, Sage Narada (Master Rajagopal) meets the Sun God, also known as Surya, (Kothamangalam Subbu) and sings praises of him. He is accosted by Thailakethu, The king of Yakshas (K. S. Gopalakrishnan), who does not like Narada praising the Sun God. He is upset and decides to teach Narada a lesson. Thapathi (K. R. Chellam) is the daughter of the Sun God, and she falls in love with King Samvaran (Kothamangalam Seenu), even without meeting him. The Yakshas King is in love with her. So, he tries to blackmail her into giving up the king. The King's first wife Sulochanan (T. R. Rajakumari) undertakes several sacrifices to save her husband. She also prays to the Sun God, and after being helped by Narada, the evil designs of the Yakshas King are destroyed. The King marries Thapathi and they all live happily thereafter.

== Cast ==
The list is adapted from the film's review article in The Hindu.

Male cast

- Kothamangalam Subbu as Sun God
- Master Rajagopal as Sage Narada
- K. S. Gopalakrishnan as Thailakethu King of Yakshas
- Kothamangalam Seenu as King Samvaran
- Papanasam Rajagopala Iyer

Female cast

- K. R. Chellam as River Thapathi
- T. R. Rajakumari as Queen Sulochana
- S. R. Janaki
- M. S. Sundari Bai
- V. Subbulakshmi

== Production ==
The script was written by K. S. Gopalakrishnan and the dialogues were penned by Kothamangalam Subbu. Sailen Bose and Kamal Ghose handled the Camera. The film was made at MPPC Studios that was owned by K. Subramanyam. (Later, S. S. Vasan bought this studio and renamed it as Gemini Studios).

== Soundtrack ==
Music was composed by V. S. Parthasarathi Ayyangar while the lyrics were written by the Papanasam brothers – Papanasam Sivan and Papanasam Rajagopala Iyer.

== Reception ==
Despite director Ellis R. Dungan's impressive camera work, the film did not do well at the box office. Film historian Randor Guy, writing in 2013, said the film is "Remembered for the deft direction of Dungan, and the impressive lens work of Sailen Bose and Kamal Ghosh".
