= Devadasi (1948 film) =

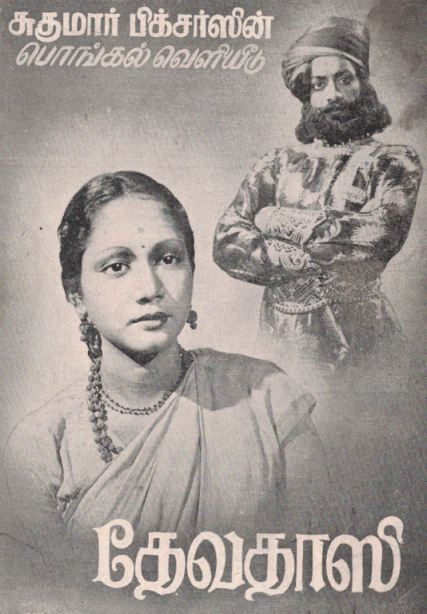
- Poster
- Directed by: Manik Lal Tandon; T. V. Sundaram
- Written by: B. S. Ramiah
- Story by: B. S. Ramiah
- Based on: Thaïs by Anatole France
- Starring: Kannan; Leela; R. Balasubramaniam; T. S. Durairaj; K. S. Angamuthu; N. S. Krishnan; T. A. Mathuram
- Cinematography: P. S. Rai
- Edited by: R. Rajagopal
- Music by: K. V. Mahadevan
- Production company: Sukumar Pictures
- Distributed by: Sukumar Pictures
- Release date: 15 January 1948 (India)
- Running time: 183 minutes
- Country: India
- Language: Tamil

Devadasi is a 1948 Tamil film directed by Manik Lal Tandon and T. V. Sundaram. The film stars Kannan, Leela, R. Balasubramaniam, and K. S. Angamuthu.

== Cast ==
The list was adapted from the review article in The Hindu newspaper.

- Kannan as the King's friend
- Leela as Devakunjari
- R. Balasubramaniam as the spiritual guru
- K. S. Angamuthu as the smart devadasi woman
- T. S. Durairaj as The king
- N. S. Krishnan as a Carnatic musician
- T. A. Mathuram as a Bharathanatyam dancer

== Production ==
The film was produced by Sukumar Pictures and was directed by Manik Lal Tandon (M. L. Tandon) and T. V. Sundaram. B. S. Ramiah wrote the screenplay and dialogues to the story that was based on a French opera, Thaïs. P. S. Rai was in charge of cinematography while R. Rajagopal did the editing. Art direction was done by Gangatharan and Shanmuganathan. This film was shot at Neptune Studios.

== Soundtrack ==
Music was composed by K. V. Mahadevan while the lyrics were penned by Rajagopala Iyer and Udumalai Narayana Kavi. N. S. Krishnan was the singer and Playback singer is Sundari Thambi.

- "Bhagyasaali Naane" - Sundari Thambi
- "Pudhu Malare" - Sundari Thambi
- "Idhupol Aanandhame" - K. V. Mahadevan, Sundari Thambi
- "Oru Vaarthaiye Solluvaai" - Sundari Thambi

== Reception ==
Writing in June 2013, film critic Randor Guy said "In spite of the high expectation, the film did not fare well at the box-office and only the comedy track became popular."

== See also ==
- Devadasi
