= Kacha Devayani =

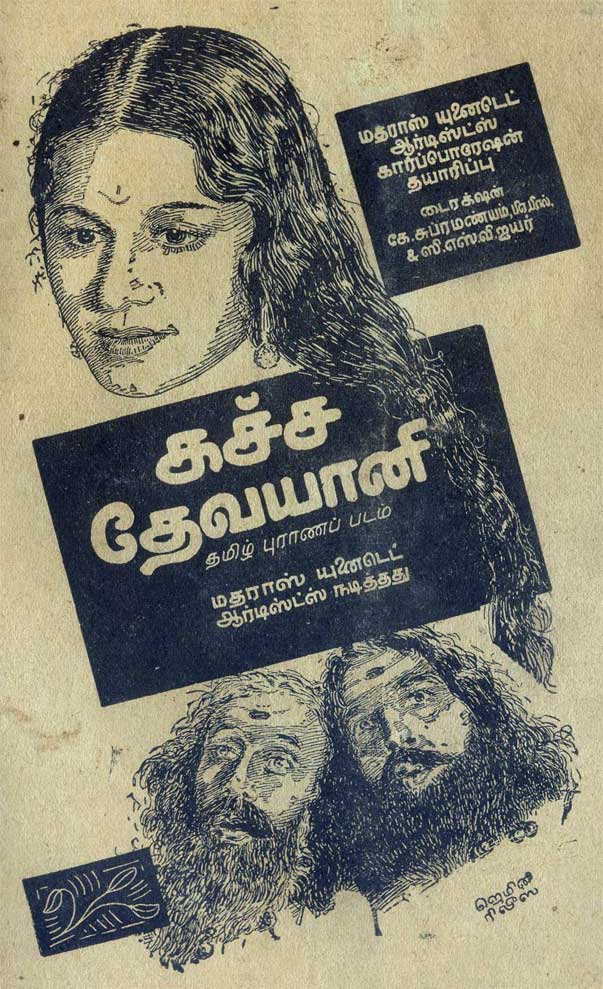
- Poster
- கச்ச தேவயானி
- Directed by: K. Subramanyam; C. S. V. Iyer
- Screenplay by: K. Subramanyam
- Story by: K. Subramanyam
- Based on: A story from the epic Mahabharata
- Produced by: K. Subramanyam
- Starring: Kothamangalam Seenu; T. R. Rajakumari
- Cinematography: Kamal Ghosh
- Edited by: R. Rajagopal
- Music by: Vidwan V. S. Parthasarathy Iyengar
- Production company: Madras United Artists Corporation
- Distributed by: Gemini Pictures
- Release date: 1941
- Country: India
- Language: Tamil

Kacha Devayani is a 1941 Indian Tamil language film produced and directed by K. Subramanyam. The film is based on a love story from Mahabharatha's Aadi parva and in Matsyapuranam and featured Kothamangalam Seenu and T. R. Rajakumari in the lead roles.

== Plot ==
Kacha is the son of Brahaspati, the Guru and leader of Devas (heavenly people). Devayani is the daughter of Sukracharya, Guru of Asuras (Demons). Frequently Devas and Asuras went to war with each other. Sukracharya knew a mantra called mritsanjeevani which has the power to revive the dead back to life. Therefore, whenever there was war, the Asuras who were killed were brought back to life whereas Devas lost their men.

Devas decided to send Kacha as a disciple of Sukracharya and told Kacha to tactfully learn the mridsanjeevani mantra. Kacha went to Sukracharya and introduced himself as the son of Brahaspati and requested Sukracharya to accept him as a sishya (disciple) for 1000 years. Sukracharya gladly agreed. Devayani saw Kacha and fell in love with him. The Asuras learned that Kacha is the son of their enemy and they waited for an opportunity to do away with him.

500 years has passed. One day Kacha herded Sukracharya's cattle to the forest to feed them. Asuras decided this is the opportunity for them as Kacha was alone. They also went to the forest, killed Kacha, cut the body into pieces and fed the tigers. When the cattle returned home without Kacha, Devayani was anxious. She told her father that someone must have killed Kacha and asked her father to revive Kacha's life as she is in love with him. So Sukracharya used his mantra and revived Kacha who returned from the forest hale and hearty.

After some years had passed, Kacha went to the forest again, this time to pluck some rare flowers. Asuras killed him again. They burnt his body and took the ashes. Then they mixed the ashes with a drink and offered it to their Guru who drank it. Again Devayani pleaded with her father to revive Kacha. Sukracharya responded, "He is in my stomach now. If I revive him, he will tear my body and come out. So, I will die. Tell me whom do you want to be with, he or me?" Devayani was in a dilemma. She said he has to offer some other solution because she needs both Kacha as well as her father.

Sukracharya pondered for a while and realised that there was only one way to solve this. He taught the mrdisanjeevani mantra to Kacha who was inside his stomach. Kacha learned it thoroughly. Then Sukracharya chanted the mantra and Kacha came out tearing away Sukracharya's body. Sukracharya died. However, Kacha chanted the mantra and revived Sukracharya.

When the 1000-year period was over, Kacha informed Sukracharya that he wished to return to heaven. Sukracharya agreed and allowed him to go. But Devayani stopped Kacha on the way and asked him to marry her. Kacha refused saying she is his Guru's daughter and therefore she is also like a Guru to him. Further, he said, as he was reborn from the stomach of Sukracharya, and hence felt Devayani is like a sister to him.

Hearing this, Devayani went into a rage and cursed him that when a need arises, Kacha will forget the mantra he learned from her father. Kacha was hurt and cursed her that no man will marry her and that whatever she wishes, will not happen. Thus ended the lives of both Kacha and Devayani.

The efforts by Devas were in vain and they were in the same plight. They prayed to Lord Shiva who advised them to go to Lord Vishnu. Consequently, Vishnu brought them immortality through Amrita.

== Cast ==
Cast according to the song book

Male cast

- Kothamangalam Seenu as Kachan
- Vidwan Srinivasan as Sukracharyar
- Master Rajagopal as Naradar
- S. Ramachandra Iyer as Vrshaparva
- Kothamangalam Subbu as Madanasuran
- C. N. Sadasivaiah as Disciple
- P. R. Rajagopala Iyer as Disciple
- Ramanujachariar as Kukkudasuran
- R. S. Ramaswami Iyengar as Devendran
- Thanjavur Mani Iyer as Brahaspathi
- B. Rajagopala Iyer as Parameswaran

Female cast

- T. R. Rajakumari as Devayani
- K. Nagalakshmi as Simhasini
- T. S. Rajammal as Indrani
- V. Subbulakshmi as Sarmishta

Supporting cast

- C. V. Ramachandran
- Sambamurthi Iyer
- Vittal Rao

== Production ==
Kacha Devayani was made in Telugu in 1938 and it was a success. It prompted K. Subramanyam to remake it in Tamil. This Tamil version, with T. R. Rajakumari in the lead, was also a success. Later, in 1955, K. Subramanyam remade the film in Kannada with B. Saroja Devi as the female lead.

== Soundtrack ==
Music was composed by V. S. Parthasarathy Iyengar and the lyrics were penned by Papanasam Sivan and his brother P. R. Rajagopala Iyer. There were 28 songs in the film. Singers are Vidwan Srinivasan, Kothamangalam Seenu, T. R. Rajakumari, Kothamangalam Subbu and Master Rajagopal. Playback singers are not known.

No	Song	Singer	Length (m:ss)
1	"Jaya Jaya Jaya Jaya Puruhuda"	Chorus	
2	"Sambho Inda Sanjeevini Dhannai"	Vidwan Srinivasan	
3	"Karunai Mikunda Gurunatha Narulirukka"	Chorus	
4	"Sahabhash Inimel Vanavargal"	Chorus	
5	"Sankara Sadasiva"	Chorus	
6	"Unmaiyutan Ookkamik Uyarguruvai"	Kothamangalam Seenu	
7	"Parkka Parkka Thikattuvathumillai"	T. R. Rajakumari	
8	"Kayadha Ganakathe Nindrulavum"	Kothamangalam Subbu	
9	"Bhoomiyinezhil Pukalavu Medharama"	Kothamangalam Seenu, T. R. Rajakumari, Kothamangalam Subbu	
10	"Vanaraja Kumari"	Kothamangalam Seenu	
11	"Arul Surakkum Meikkuru Vena"	Kothamangalam Seenu	
12	"Premaiye Jagam"	Kothamangalam Seenu, T. R. Rajakumari	
13	"Maname Illaiyo Pulli"	Kothamangalam Seenu	
14	"Irunda Vazhvil Kuthuhalam"	T. R. Rajakumari	
15	"Manamo Gana Manen"	Kothamangalam Subbu	
16	"Narumana Mikumalare Unadhu"	T. R. Rajakumari	
17	"Sarasam Seiyave Vanthanai"	Kothamangalam Seenu, T. R. Rajakumari	
18	"Ivanu Kothanai Thamir Adpap"	Chorus	
19	"Parama Kripanidhe"	T. R. Rajakumari	
20	"Mahimai En Solluven"	Kothamangalam Seenu	
21	"Anbariya Aadavar Irumbu"	T. R. Rajakumari, Kothamangalam Seenu	
22	"Avanaiyiladavar Ullame Vairamadho"	T. R. Rajakumari, Kothamangalam Seenu	
23	"Panaiyile Pananjare"	Chorus	
24	"Yavum Mana Mohame"	Master Rajagopal	
25	"Aridharidhe Bhanamidhe Vanula Korum"	Chorus	
26	"Parvathee Pathiye Unadambuja"	Vidwan Srinivasan	
27	"Esha Kayilachalam Vazh Jagadesa"	Vidwan Srinivasan, Kothamangalam Seenu	
28	"Sankara Sripurahara Parvathi Nayaka"	Chorus	
