= B. S. Saroja =

Indian actress

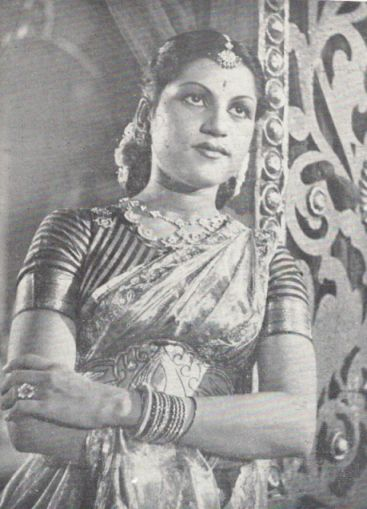
- B. S. Saroja in 1949 film Deva Manohari
- Born: Thiruvananthapuram, India
- Occupation: Film actor
- Years active: 1941–1978

B. S. Saroja is an Indian actress in Malayalam and Tamil films. She acted with M. G. Ramachandran ("MGR") and Sivaji Ganesan in Koondukkili, and played the heroine in two other films with MGR in the 1950s, Genova and Pudhumai Piththan.

== Early life and education ==
B. S. Saroja was born in Thiruvananthapuram, India. Her father was the actor Johnson, who acted in the first Malayalam film, Vigathakumaran.

She studied till fourth grade.

== Career ==
Saroja first joined a circus company, with which she travelled all over India, before acting in a Tamil film as a junior artist.

Jeevitha Nouka was her first Malayalam movie.

== Partial filmography ==
Year	Film	Language	Notes
1941	Madanakamarajan	Tamil	dance
1942	Kannagi	Tamil	dance
1943	Kubera Kuchela	Tamil	dance
1943	Mangamma Sabatham	Tamil	dance
1944	Mahamaya	Tamil	dance
1944	Raja Rajeswari	Tamil	dance
1945	Burma Rani	Tamil	dance
1946	Vikatayogi	Tamil	
1947	Vichitra Vanitha	Tamil	
1947	Dhana Amaravathi	Tamil	
1949	Geetha Gandhi	Tamil	
1949	Naattiya Rani	Tamil	
1949	Inbavalli	Tamil	
1949	Deva Manohari	Tamil	
1950	Parijatham	Tamil	
1951	Jeevitha Nouka	Malayalam	
1951	Aada Janma	Telugu	
1951	Pichaikkari	Tamil	
1951	Or Iravu	Tamil	
1952	Achan	Malayalam	
1952	Aathmasakhi	Malayalam	
1952	Aathmasakhi	Tamil	
1952	Amarakavi	Tamil	
1952	Amma	Malayalam	
1952	Kalyani	Tamil	
1952	Atthainti Kaapuram	Telugu	
1952	Kaliyugam	Tamil	
1953	Asai Magan	Tamil	
1953	Aashadeepam	Malayalam	
1953	Jenova	Tamil	
1953	Jenova	Malayalam	
1953	Vazha Pirandhaval	Tamil	
1953	Lokaneethi	Malayalam	
1954	Avan Varunnu	Malayalam	
1954	Koondukkili	Tamil	
1954	Mangalyam	Tamil	
1956	Aathmaarpanam	Malayalam	
1957	Pudumai Pithan	Tamil	
1958	Lilly	Malayalam	
1959	Pandithevan	Tamil	
1959	Vannakili	Tamil	
1960	Umma	Malayalam	
1961	Krishna Kuchela	Malayalam	
1961	Kumudham	Tamil	
1962	Puthiya Akasam Puthiya Bhoomi	Malayalam	
1963	Kadalamma	Malayalam	
1964	Arunagirinathar	Tamil	
1966	Tharavattamma	Malayalam	
1978	Anthonees Punyavaalan	Malayalam	
