= Kali N. Rathnam =

Tamil actor

Narayana Padaiyatchi Rathnam
- Ratnam in the movie Sabapathy (1941)
- Born: Ratnam c. 1897; Kumbakonam, British Raj
- Died: August 1950 (age 52 or 53); Kumbakonam, India
- Occupations: stage and film actor, singer
- Years active: 1923–1950
- Spouse(s): Kunjammal, Pichaiammal, C. T. Rajakantham
- Children: Meenalochani Rajaram, Lokanayaki, Shanmuga Sundaram

Narayana Padaiyatchi Ratnam (c. 1897 – August 1950), popularly known as "Kali" N. Ratnam, was a Tamil stage and film artist known for his roles as a comedian in Tamil movies of the 1930s and 1940s. Renowned Tamil actor and politician M. G. Ramachandran was a protege of Rathnam.

== Early life ==
Rathnam was born at Malaiyappanallur near Kumbakonam in Tanjore District in 1897 to Narayana Padayatchi and Thangathammal. His parents were agriculturists and Rathnam was acquainted with rural songs and folk arts from a very early age. As a young boy, Rathnam learned to act from a stage actor named Parameswaran Iyer. Seeing Rathnam perform the role of Kali in a stage play, Iyer christened him "Kali" N. Rathnam.

== Career ==
Rathnam joined the Madurai Original Boys Company in 1923 and acted in Pathi Bhakthi (1936), the first movie produced by the company. Rathnam's second movie was Mannarswami (1936). But Rathnam's first hit was Chandrakantha (1936). Following the success, Rathnam acted in hit movies such as Uthama Puthiran, Sathi Murali (1940), Sabapathy (1941), Manonmani (1943), Burma Rani (1945), Chow Chow (1945), Paranjothi (1945), Sri Murugan (1946), Arthanari (1946), Aaravalli (1946), Sahada Yogam (1946), Udayanan Vasavadatta (1947), Kannika (1947), Sulochana (1947), Sri Aandal (1948), Adhithan Kanavu (1948), Devdasi (1948), Pizhaikum Vali (1948), and Bhojan (1948).

== Personal life ==
While in a drama tour of Coimbatore, Rathnam was impressed by the histrionic skills of C. T. Rajakantham, daughter of the owner of the house in which they stayed and inducted her into his troupe. The two became a successful comedy pair and acted together in a number of movies.

Prior to this, Rathnam had married twice. The first wife's name was Kunjammal who died at a young age. Rathnam and Kunjammal had two daughters Meenalochani and Lokanayaki(late). Then he married his second wife Pichaimmal(late). Rathnam and Pichaimmal had a son Shanmuga Sundaram (Retd PWD Superintendent Engineer). Rathnam died when his son was nine months old. Shanmuga Sundaram married Chandra, daughter of his sister Meenalochani RajaRam. Now(2020) Meenalochani RajaRam, Shanmuga Sundaram and Chandra are living in Kumbakonam.

== Death ==
Rathnam died in August 1950 at the age of 52 or 53. His last completed film role was in the Ellis R. Dungan-directed Ponmudi.

== Filmography ==
This is a partial filmography. You can expand it.

Year	Film	Role
1936	Pathi Bhakti	Detective
1936	Mannarswami	
1936	Chandrakantha	Thirukallur Bandaara Sannidhigal
1937	Raja Mohan	
1938	Punjab Kesari	
1938	Meenakshi Kalyanam	
1939	Mathru Bhoomi	
1940	Uthama Puthiran	
1940	Sathi Murali	
1941	Sabapathy	Sabapathy
1941	Surya Puthri	
1942	Manonmani	
1942	Sivalinga Satchi	
1943	Dewan Bahadur	
1945	Burma Rani	Kunjitham
1945	Chow Chow	
1945	Paranjothi	
1946	Sri Murugan	
1946	Arthanari	
1946	Aaravalli	
1946	Sahada Yogam	
1946	Valmiki	
1947	Kannika	
1947	Udayanan Vasavadatta	
1947	Sulochana	
1947	Aayiram Thalai Vaangi Apoorva Chinthamani	Kali
1948	Sri Aandal	
1948	Adhithan Kanavu	
1948	Devadasi	
1948	Pizhaikum Vali	
1948	Bhojan	
1949	Mayavathi	
1950	Ezhai Padum Padu	
1950	Ponmudi	
