= K. R. Chellam =

Indian actress (born 1918)

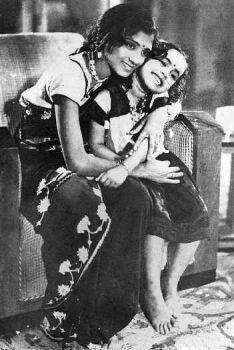
- Chellam (left) in Balayogini (1937)
- Born: Kambayanatham Rangaswami Kanakavalli; 15 June 1918 (age 108); Thanjavur
- Occupation: Actress
- Years active: 1935–1960

Kambayanatham Rangaswami Kanakavalli Born on (15 June 1918), known professionally as K. R. Chellam, was an Indian actress who appeared in Tamil language films.

== Early life ==
Kambayanatham Rangaswami Kanakavalli was born in 1918 to a middle-class Iyengar family in Thanjavur. She lost her mother at an early age, so her father Rangaswami, a lawyer, raised her along with her two siblings. Chellam, as she was informally known, dropped out of school early, and married a Bombay-based insurance salesman, later settling there with him. The marriage resulted in two daughters. After the family incurred financial losses due to the insurance salesman's mismanagement, they went to Madras almost penniless.

== Career ==
Kanakavalli made her film debut in a minor role in Kausalya (1935) to support her family financially. As working in films was considered taboo in India at that time and she did not want her acquaintances to know she was in that profession, she chose her nickname Chellam as her stage name, though her family ultimately learned the truth. The film became a box office bomb and its production company closed, forcing Chellam to continue as an actress to stay afloat. With help from actress T. N. Meenakshi, she was cast in a bigger role in Madras Mail (1936). This film performed well and got Chellam noticed, resulting in her being cast in Balayogini (1937), also a success. Her next film Vanaraja Karzan (1938) received significant media attention because she wore a revealing outfit. Adrishtam (1939), in which she played a lawyer, established her as an actress of "high merit". She was active in films from 1935 to about 1960. Her last film was Pattaliyin Vetri (1960). As of September 1990, Chellam was living in Madras with one of her daughters, a doctor.

== Filmography ==
Year	Title	Role	Ref.
1935	Kausalya		
1936	Madras Mail		
1937	Balayogini	Sarasa	
1938	Vanaraja Karzan	Leela	
1938	Desa Munnetram		
1939	Adrishtam	Lawyer	
1941	Surya Puthri	Thapathi	
1942	En Manaivi	Chellam	
1943	Karaikkal Ammaiyar		
1944	Prabhavathi	Shakthi	
1944	Poompavai	Ponnammal	
1945	Meera	Udha	
1946	Lavangi	Komalam	
1947	Naam Iruvar	Ambujam	
1947	Deiva Needhi		
1948	Vedhala Ulagam	Mohanavalli	
1948	Bhaktha Jana		
1952	Thai Ullam	Santhamma	
1953	Jatakam	Kannammal	
1954	Rajee En Kanmani	Raji's aunt	
1954	Vaira Maalai		
1955	Kalvanin Kadhali		
1956	Mathar Kula Manikkam		
1957	Karpukkarasi	Singari	
1959	Aval Yaar		
1959	Orey Vazhi		
1960	Pattaliyin Vetri		
1960	Paavai Vilakku		
