= T. S. Durairaj =

Indian actor

Kalaimamani Tanjour S. Durairaj
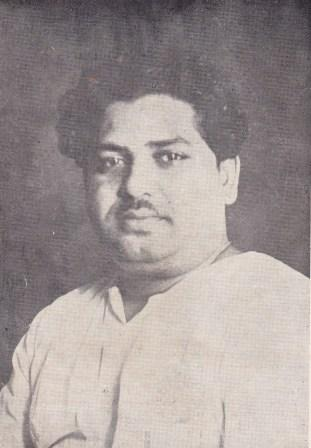
- Born: 31 December 1910; Pattukkottai, Madras Presidency, British India (now Tamil Nadu, India)
- Died: 2 June 1986 (aged 75); Madras (now Chennai), Tamil Nadu, India
- Occupation: actor
- Years active: 23 years

T. S. Durairaj (31 December 1910 – 2 June 1986) was a Tamil film comedian, drama artist, producer and director in the early stages of the Tamil film industry (Kollywood). He was posthumously awarded Kalaimamani award by the Tamil Nadu Government in 2006.

== Early life and death ==
T. S. Durairaj was born on 31 December 1910. He was born in Pattukkottai, now in Madras Presidency, British India (now Thanjavur, Tamil Nadu) and died on 2 June 1986 at the age of 75.

== Career ==
T. S. Durairaj's career in films started with 'Boys' drama company which had several talented youngsters who created history in Tamil cinema, including Sivaji Ganesan, MGR, M.K. Thyagaraja Bhagavathar, P.U. Chinnappa, K. R. Ramasami, S.S. Rajendran, N.S.Krishnan, T.K. Shanmugham and T.K. Bhagavathi.Durairaj acted on stage and became closely associated with NSK, who was making his way ahead. In ‘Rambayin Kaadhal’ (1939), NSK and T. A. Mathuram took over the comedy parts along with Durairaj, who made a mark with his debut film. As N. S. Krishnan accusation in the Lakshmikanthan murder case, gave T. S. Durairaj more opportunity in the industry and his career graph grew big.

== Horse racing ==
Durairaj had deep interests extended to Derby races and gambling. He owned two horses named KIN Master and WIN Master. he lost most of wealth in Horse race gambling.

== Movie Production ==
Durairaj also ventured into Cinema production under Marakatha Pictures. His debut production was Paanai Pidithaval Bhaagyasaali. His movie production also failed.

== Filmography (partial) ==
1. Rambaiyin kaathal/Yathabhavishya (1939) as Kesari (debut)
2. Thiruneelakantar (1939)
3. Prahalada (1939)
4. Naveena Vikramadityan (1940)
5. Sakuntalai (1940)
6. Madanakamarajan (1941)
7. Minor-in Kadhal (1941)
8. Savithiri (1941)
9. Sathi Sukanya (1942)
10. Maya Jothi (1942)
11. Gangavathar (1942)
12. Sivalinga Satchi (1942)
13. Tamizhariyum Perumal (1942)
14. Karaikkal Ammaiyar (1943)
15. Kubera Kuchela (1943)
16. Meera (1945)
17. Chitra (1946)
18. Sakata Yogam (1946)
19. Deiva Neethi (1947)
20. Kadagam (1947)
21. Ponnaruvi (1947)
22. Thulasi Jalandar (1947)
23. Aayiram Thalai Vaangi Apoorva Chinthamani (1947)
24. Devadasi (1948)
25. Pizhaikkum Vazhi (1948) - Lead role with T. A. Jayalakshmi as heroine
26. Thirumalisai Alvar (1948)
27. Ratnakumar (1949)
28. Mangayarkarasi (1949)
29. Ezhai Padum Padu (1950)
30. Kalavathi (1951) - Lead role with T. A. Jayalakshmi as heroine
31. Manamagal (1951)
32. Or Iravu (1951)
33. Kanchana (1952)
34. Kumari (1952)
35. Amma (1952)
36. Genova (1953)
37. Panakkaari (1953)
38. Thirumbi Paar (1953)
39. Malaikkallan (1954)
40. Kalvanin Kadhali (1955)
41. Maaman Magal (1955)
42. Valliyin Selvan (1955)
43. Kaalam Maari Pochu (1956)
44. Kudumba Vilakku (1956)
45. Moondru Pengal (1956)
46. Iru Sagodharigal (1957)
47. Pudhu Vazhvu (1957)
48. Kanniyin Sabatham (1958)
49. Paanai Pidithaval Bhaagyasaali (1958) - His own production
50. Maragatham (1959)
51. Nalla Theerpu (1959)
52. Arumai Magal Abirami (1959)
53. Padikkadha Medhai (1960)
54. Kappalottiya Thamizhan (1961)
55. Kumara Raja (1961)
56. Pangaaligal (1961)
57. Nichaya Thaamboolam (1962) as Pichai Muthu
