= T. R. Rajakumari =

Indian actress, Carnatic singer and dancer

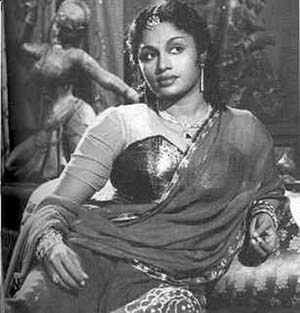
- T. R. Rajakumari in Sivakavi (1943).
- Born: Thanjavur Radhakrishnan Rajayee; 5 May 1922; Thanjavur, Madras Presidency, British India
- Died: 20 September 1999 (age 77); Chennai, Tamil Nadu, India
- Years active: 1936–1963
- Parent(s): Father: Radhakrishnan; Mother: Ranganayaki
- Family: T. S. Damayanthi (Sister), T. D. Kusalakumari (niece), T. R. Ramanna (brother)

Thanjavur Radhakrishnan Rajayee (5 May 1922 – 20 September 1999), better known by her screen name T. R. Rajakumari, was an Indian actress, Carnatic singer and dancer. She has been called the first "dream girl" of Tamil cinema.

== Film career ==
Rajayee made her film debut in Kumara Kulothungan, which was produced in 1938–39 but was released in 1941, after Kacha Devayani. In the initial ads, her name appeared as T. R. Rajayee, but later in the film, she was credited as T. R. Rajalakshmi. Her second film, Mandharavathi, directed by D.S. Marconi, was also released in 1941. Kacha Devayani (1941) was a hit and helped launch her career in movies. There is some confusion about which film she actually made her debut in, as the director of Kacha Devayani K. Subramaniam, later insisted that he was the one who introduced her to films. In 1944, Rajakumari starred in the record-breaking film Haridas alongside M. K. Thyagaraja Bhagavathar and gained recognition for her glamorous portrayal.

In her Tamil film career, Rajakumari acted as the female lead opposite many major film stars, including Thyagaraja Bhagavathar, T. R. Mahalingam, K. R. Ramasamy, P. U. Chinnappa, M. G. Ramachandran and Sivaji Ganesan. She also started a film production company (with her brother T. R. Ramanna) called "R. R. Pictures" and produced films like Vaazhapirandhavan (1953), Koondukkili (1954), Gul-E-Bagaavali (1955), Paasam (1962), Periya Idathu Penn (1963), Panam Padaithavan (1965) and Parakkum Paavai (1966). Her last film as an actress was Vanambadi (1963).

== Later life and death ==
Rajakumari died on 20 September 1999 after a prolonged illness.

== Partial filmography ==
Year	Title	Language	Role	Notes
1939	Kumara Kulothungan	Tamil	Buvaneswari	
1941	Kacha Devayani	Tamil	Devayani	
1941	Mandharavathi	Tamil		
1941	Surya Puthri	Tamil	Queen Sulochana	
1942	Sathi Sukanya	Tamil		
1942	Manonmani	Tamil	Manonmani	
1943	Sivakavi	Tamil	Vanji	
1943	Kubera Kuchela	Tamil	Mallika	
1944	Haridas	Tamil	Ramba (Dasi)	
1944	Prabhavathi	Tamil	Mayavathi	
1945	Saalivaahanan	Tamil	Chandralekha	
1946	Valmiki	Tamil		
1946	Vikatayogi	Tamil		
1947	Pankajavalli	Tamil		
1948	Brahma Rishi Vishwamitra	Tamil	Menaka	
1948	Chandralekha	Tamil	Chandralekha	
1948	Chandralekha	Hindi	Chandralekha	
1949	Krishna Bakthi	Tamil	Devakumari	
1949	Pavalakkodi	Tamil	Pavalakkodi	
1950	Ithaya Geetham	Tamil	Thara	
1950	Vijayakumari	Tamil		
1951	Vanasundari	Tamil	Vanasundari	
1952	Amarakavi	Tamil	Padmini	
1953	Anbu	Tamil	Thangam	
1953	En Veedu	Tamil		
1953	Na Illu	Telugu		
1953	Panakkaari	Tamil		
1953	Vazha Pirandhaval	Tamil		
1954	Manohara	Tamil	Vasanthasenai	Bilingual film
1954	Manohara	Telugu	Vasanthasena	Bilingual film
1955	Gulebagavali	Tamil	Princess Lakbesha	
1955	Rajkumari	Hindi		
1957	Pudhumai Pithan	Tamil	Inbavalli	
1957	Thangamalai Ragasiyam	Tamil	Nandhini	
1957	Rathnagiri Rahasyam	Telugu	Nandhini	
1957	Veera Khadgamu	Telugu	Inbavalli	
1959	Thanga Padhumai	Tamil	Maya Mohini	
1961	Kanyaka Parameswari Mahatmyam	Telugu	Maya Mohini	
1962	Paasam	Tamil	Shantha	
1963	Vanambadi	Tamil	Parvathi	
1963	Periya Idathu Penn	Tamil	Gangamma	

== Discography ==
Year	Film	Language	Song	Co-singers	Music director
1941	Kacha Devayani	Tamil	Parkka Parkka Thikattuvathumillai		Vidwan V. S. Parthasarathy Iyengar
1941	Kacha Devayani	Tamil	Bhoomiyinezhil Pukalavu Medharama	Kothamangalam Seenu & Kothamangalam Subbu	Vidwan V. S. Parthasarathy Iyengar
1941	Kacha Devayani	Tamil	Premaiye Jagam	Kothamangalam Seenu	Vidwan V. S. Parthasarathy Iyengar
1941	Kacha Devayani	Tamil	Irunda Vazhvil Kuthuhalam		Vidwan V. S. Parthasarathy Iyengar
1941	Kacha Devayani	Tamil	Narumana Mikumalare Unadhu		Vidwan V. S. Parthasarathy Iyengar
1941	Kacha Devayani	Tamil	Sarasam Seiyave Vanthanai	Kothamangalam Seenu	Vidwan V. S. Parthasarathy Iyengar
1941	Kacha Devayani	Tamil	Parama Kripanidhe		Vidwan V. S. Parthasarathy Iyengar
1941	Kacha Devayani	Tamil	Anbariya Aadavar Irumbu	Kothamangalam Seenu	Vidwan V. S. Parthasarathy Iyengar
1941	Kacha Devayani	Tamil	Avanaiyiladavar Ullame Vairamadho	Kothamangalam Seenu	Vidwan V. S. Parthasarathy Iyengar
1943	Kubera Kuchela	Tamil	Ennai Vittu Engey Sentreer		Kunnakudi Venkatarama Iyer & S. V. Venkatraman
1944	Prabhavathi	Tamil	Varuvare Varuvare		
1944	Prabhavathi	Tamil	Engum Eppozhutham Vilaiyatta	C. Honnappa Bhagavathar & K. Mahadevan Iyer	
1944	Prabhavathi	Tamil	Ododi Vasantham Poovodu Sambandam	C. Honnappa Bhagavathar	
1944	Prabhavathi	Tamil	Gomatha Neeye Adharame Shri Gomatha		
1944	Prabhavathi	Tamil	Marumalithai Soodumthirumal Magan Enge		
1947	Pankajavalli	Tamil	Dheivamum Mandhira Vaal		Papanasam Sivan
1947	Pankajavalli	Tamil	Devinin Vadivazhagai		Papanasam Sivan
1947	Chandralekha	Tamil	Indrae Enathu Kuthukalam		S. Rajeswara Rao
1947	Chandralekha	Tamil	Manamohana Saaranae		S. Rajeswara Rao
1947	Chandralekha	Tamil	Aaduven Mayilaayi Naan	Mayavaram Venu	S. Rajeswara Rao
1947	Chandralekha	Tamil	Vaanamengume Nirainthu	Mayavaram Venu	S. Rajeswara Rao
1949	Krishna Bhakthi	Tamil	Enna Vazhvu		S. V. Venkatraman & Kunnakudi Venkatarama Iyer
1950	Ithaya Geetham	Tamil	Vaanulaavum Tharai Nee En Ithaya Geethame	T. R. Mahalingam	S. V. Venkatraman
1950	Ithaya Geetham	Tamil	Odi Vaa Venmugil Poley	T. R. Mahalingam	S. V. Venkatraman
1950	Vijayakumari	Tamil	Katchi Yaavaiyum	K. R. Ramasamy & A. L. Raghavan	C. R. Subburaman & C. S. Jayaraman
1950	Vijayakumari	Tamil	Pozhuthu Vidinthaal		C. R. Subburaman & C. S. Jayaraman
1948	Vanasundari	Tamil	Kannile Vilaiyaadum Inba Kaadhal	P. U. Chinnappa	S. V. Venkataraman & C. R. Subburaman
1948	Vanasundari	Tamil	Mannan Pennaaga Naanum Mann Meedhu		S. V. Venkataraman & C. R. Subburaman
1948	Vanasundari	Tamil	Namasthe Namasthe	P. U. Chinnappa	S. V. Venkataraman & C. R. Subburaman
1952	Amarakavi	Tamil	Pasiyaale Nondhene		G. Ramanathan & T. A. Kalyanam
1952	Amarakavi	Tamil	Thoondi Mullu Pole...Paarunga Thinnu		G. Ramanathan & T. A. Kalyanam
1953	Anbu	Tamil	Anbe Dheiveegam.... Anbaale Ulagil		T. R. Pappa
1953	Anbu	Tamil	Kappadhu Un Paramamma		T. R. Pappa
1953	Anbu	Tamil	Manadhu Magizhave Manamum		T. R. Pappa
1953	Vazha Pirandhaval	Tamil	Chandiranai Polirukkumaa		G. Ramanathan & S. Rajeswara Rao
1953	Vazha Pirandhaval	Tamil	Vaazha Pirandhaval Naan	T. A. Mothi & P. Leela	G. Ramanathan & S. Rajeswara Rao
1954	Manohara	Tamil	Pozhudhu Pularndhadhe		S. V. Venkatraman & T. R. Ramanathan
