= List of Tamil films of 1953 =

Prior to the amendment of Tamil Nadu Entertainments Tax Act 1939 on 1 April 1958, Gross was 133.33 per cent of Nett for all films.

The following is a list of films produced in the Tamil film industry in India in 1953, in alphabetical order.

== 1953 ==
Title	Director	Production	Music	Cast	Release date
Anbu	M. Natesan	Natesh Art Pictures	T. R. Pappa	Sivaji Ganesan, T. R. Rajakumari, Padmini, Rushyendramani, Lalitha, K. A. Thangavelu, T. S. Jaya	24-07-1953
Asai Magan	G. R. Rao	Associated Productions	V. Dakshinamoorthy	Gemini Ganesan, Sathyan, B. S. Saroja, Padmini, Aranmula Ponnamma, Girija	18-09-1953
Avvaiyar	Kothamangalam Subbu	Gemini Studios	M. D. Parthasarathy; P. S. Anandaraman; Mayavaram Venu	K. B. Sundarambal, M. K. Radha, Gemini Ganesan, D. Balasubramaniam, L. Narayana Rao, T. V. Kumudhini, M. S. Sundari Bai	15-08-1953
Azhagi	Sundar Rao Nadkarni	Jupiter Pictures	P. R. Mani	S. A. Natarajan, Krishna Kumari, M. N. Nambiar, Revathi	11-12-1953
Chandirani	P. Bhanumathi	Bharani Pictures	C. R. Subburaman; M. S. Viswanathan	P. Bhanumathi, N. T. Rama Rao, Relangi	18-08-1953
Devadas	Vedantam Raghavayya	Vinoda Pictures	C. R. Subburaman; Viswanathan–Ramamoorthy	A. Nageswara Rao, Savitri, Lalitha, M. N. Nambiar, C. S. R. Anjaneyulu, S. V. Ranga Rao	11-09-1953
En Veedu	V. Nagayya	Our India Films	V. Nagayya; A. Rama Rao	V. Nagayya, T. R. Rajakumari, T. S. Balaiah, V. Gopalakrishnan, Vidyavathi, Girija	-01-1953
Genova	F. Nagoor	Chandra Pictures	M. S. Viswanathan; M. S. Gnanamani; T. A. Kalyanam	M. G. Ramachandran, B. S. Saroja, T. S. Durairaj	01-06-1953
Gumastha	R. M. Krishnaswamy	Aruna Pictures	G. Ramanathan; V. Nagayya; C. N. Pandurangan	V. Nagayya, Pandari Bai, B. Jayamma, P. V. Narasimha Bharathi, R. S. Manohar, 'Friend' Ramasami, C. K. Saraswathi, M. Saroja	03-04-1953
Inspector	R. S. Mani	Jupiter Pictures	G. Ramanathan	S. Balachander, Anjali Devi, T. K. Shanmugam, T. K. Bhagavathi, S. A. Natarajan, M. S. Draupathi, P. K. Saraswathi, S. R. Janaki	31-07-1953
Jatagam	R. Nagendra Rao	R. N. R. Pictures	R. Govardhanam	T. K. Balachandran, K. Suryakala, R. Nagendra Rao, K. Sarangapani, K. N. Kamalam, K. R. Chellam, K. S. Angamuthu	25-12-1953
Kangal	Krishnan–Panju	Motion Pictures Team	G. Ramanathan; S. V. Venkatraman	Sivaji Ganesan, Pandari Bai, S. V. Sahasranamam, Mynavathi, J. P. Chandrababu, V. K. Ramasamy, M. N. Rajam, C. T. Rajakantham	05-11-1953
Lakshmi	K. B. Nagabhushanam	Sri Raja Rajeswari Films	M. D. Parthasarathy	P. Kannamba, R. S. Manohar, C. V. V. Panthulu, Vanaja, J. P. Chandrababu, M. Saroja	19-12-1953
Madana Mohini	M. L. Pathi	Liberty Pictures	K. V. Mahadevan	P. V. Narasimha Bharathi, C. R. Rajakumari, Pollachi Kamala, M. L. Pathi, 'Pulimoottai' Ramaswami, K. S. Angamuthu, V. M. Ezhumalai, Loose Arumugam	14-03-1953
Mamiyar	K. Vembu	Sri Gajanana Productions	C. N. Pandurangan	R. S. Manohar, S. Varalakshmi, Suryakantham, Relangi, M. S. S. Bhagyam, B. R. Panthulu, Girija	04-03-1953
Manam Pola Mangalyam	P. Pullaiah	Narayanan & Company	A. Rama Rao	Gemini Ganesan, Savitri, Surabhi Balasaraswathi, K. Sarangapani, M. R. Santhanalakshmi	05-11-1953
Manidhanum Mirugamum	K. Vembu; S. D. Sundharam	Revathi Productions	G. Govindarajulu Naidu	Sivaji Ganesan, Madhuri Devi, N. N. Kannappa, K. Sarangapani, T. R. Ramachandran, M. N. Rajam	04-12-1953
Manithan	K. Ramnoth	Jupiter Pictures; Lavanya Pictures	S. V. Venkatraman	T. K. Shanmugam, T. K. Bhagavathi, Krishnakumari, S. A. Natarajan, Madhuri Devi, C. V. V. Panthulu, Pandari Bai	17-04-1953
Marumagal	D. Yoganand	Krishna Pictures	C. R. Subburaman; G. Ramanathan; Viswanathan–Ramamoorthy	N. T. Rama Rao, Padmini, Lalitha, T. R. Ramachandran, S. V. Sahasranamam, Surabhi Balasaraswathi	14-04-1953
Minmini	T. V. Ramnoth, Krishnaswamy	R. A. L. Thenankoon Production		Vijayakumar, Krishna Sharma, Mangalam, Menaka, T. K. Kalyanam, Chitra Krishnasami	11-06-1953
Muyarchi	Joseph Pallippad	C. C. Production	S. G. K. Pillai; P. Kalinga Rao	P. V. Narasimha Bharathi, Revathi, P. A. Thomas, V. K. Ramasamy, M. Lakshmi Prabha	17-06-1953
Naalvar	V. Krishnan	Sangeetha Pictures	K. V. Mahadevan	A. P. Nagarajan, Kumari Thankam, N. N. Kannappa, M. N. Krishnan, S. R. Janaki, V. N. Natesan, T. P. Muthulakshmi, R. Balasubramaniam, C. R. Vijayakumari, V. M. Ezhumalai, E. R. Sahadevan	05-11-1953
Naam	A. Kasilingam	Jupiter Pictures; Mekala Pictures	C. S. Jayaraman	M. G. Ramachandran, V. N. Janaki, M. N. Nambiar, P. S. Veerappa, M. G. Chakrapani, P. K. Saraswathi, S. R. Janaki	05-03-1953
Panakkaari	K. S. Gopala Krishnan	Uma Pictures	S. V. Venkatraman	T. R. Rajakumari, M. G. Ramachandran, V. Nagayya, Javar Seetharaman, C. V. V. Panthulu, Mangalam, T. S. Durairaj, K. R. Chellam, K. A. Thangavelu, T. S. Jaya	01-04-1953
Paropakaram	Kamal Ghosh	Shobha Films	Ghantasala	G. Varalakshmi, Ramesh Sharma, Savitri, Relangi	25-09-1953
Petrathai	K. S. Prakash Rao	Prakash Productions	Pendyala Nageswara Rao	A. Nageswara Rao, G. Varalakshmi, M. N. Nambiar, R. Nageswara Rao, Rajasulochana, T. D. Vasantha, C. Varalakshmi	
Ponni	A. S. A. Sami; C. S. Rao	Pakshiraja Studios	S. M. Subbaiah Naidu	Sriram, Lalitha, Padmini, Kaushik, D. Balasubramaniam, Santha Kumari, T. S. Durairaj, P. S. Gnanam	26-06-1953
Poongothai	L. V. Prasad	Anjali Pictures	P. Adinarayana Rao	A. Nageswara Rao, Anjali Devi, Sivaji Ganesan, Relangi, Pandari Bai, T. D. Vasantha	01-02-1953
Ratna Deepam	Debaki Bose	Debaki Bose Productions	Robin Chatterjee		11-9-53
Rohini	Kamal Ghosh	Madras Arts Production	G. Ramanathan; K. V. Mahadevan; D. C. Dutt	Madhuri Devi, S. V. Ranga Rao, S. A. Natarajan, S. V. Sahasranamam, Rajasulochana, G. Varalakshmi, C. K. Saraswathi, T. P. Muthulakshmi, Lanka Satyam	02-11-1953
Thandhai	M. R. S. Mani	Excel Productions	P. S. Divakar	Prem Nazir, B. S. Saroja, Thikkurissy Sukumaran Nair, Bopan Kunjako, T. S. Jayashree, Baby Girija, S. P. Pillai, Pankajavalli	00-04-1953
Thirumbi Paar	T. R. Sundaram	Modern Theatres	G. Ramanathan	Sivaji Ganesan, Pandari Bai, P. V. Narasimha Bharathi, Krishna Kumari, Girija, T. S. Durairaj, K. A. Thangavelu	10-07-1953
Ulagam	L. S. Ramachandran	Society Pictures	M. S. Gnanamani	V. Nagayya, M. V. Rajamma, T. E. Varadan, P. K. Saraswathi, P. S. Veerappa, M. S. Draupathi, T. R. Rajani, Pulimoottai Ramasami, M. Lakshmiprabha, C. K. Saraswathi, K. S. Angamuthu	10-07-1953
Vanjam	Y. R. Swamy	Rohini Pictures	T. A. Kalyanam	Kanta Rao, Savithri, Gummadi, K. Sarangapani, Girija, Seetha	05-12-1953
Vazha Pirandhaval	T. R. Ramanna	R. R. Pictures	S. Rajeswara Rao; G. Ramanathan	Sriram, T. R. Rajakumari, K. Sarangapani, Pandari Bai, B. S. Saroja, J. P. Chandrababu	08-04-1953
Velaikari Magal	C. V. Ranganatha Das	Rajyam Pictures	C. R. Subbaraman; S. Dakshinamurthi	N. T. Rama Rao, C. Lakshmi Rajyam, S. V. Ranga Rao, Santha Kumari, T. Kanakam, Relangi, Suryakantam	14-01-1953

== Dubbed films ==
Title	Director(s)	Company	Composer	Original film		Cast
Title	Director(s)	Company	Composer	Title	Language	Cast
Avan	Raja Nawathe	R. K. Films	Shankar Jaikishan	Aah	Hindi	Nargis, Raj Kapoor, Pran, Vijayalaxmi, Ramesh Sinha
Nalla Pillai	Bhagwan Dada	Bhagwan Art Productions	C. Ramchandra	Albela	Hindi	Geeta Bali, Bhagwan Dada, Sunder, Badri Prasad, Prathima Devi, Nihal, Maruti, Dulari
Ratha Deepam	Debaki Bose	Debaki Bose Productions	Robin Chatterjee	Ratna Deepam	Bengali	A. Gupta, Manju Dey, Abhi Bhattacharya, Pahari Sanyal, Kamal Mitra
Sathya Sodhanai	H. L. N. Simha	AVM Productions; Karnataka Films	R. Sudharsanam	Gunasagari	Kannada	C. Honnappa Bhagavathar, Gubbi Veeranna, Pandari Bai, T. S. Balaiah, T. S. K. Basayya, C. V. V Panthalu, Rajasulochana
