= G. Ramanathan =

Background information
- Also known as: GR
- Born: Bikshandarkoil, Trichinopoly District, Madras Presidency, British India
- Died: 20 November 1963 Chennai, Madras State, India
- Occupations: Composer, music director
- Instruments: Vocals (playback singing), keyboard/harmonium/piano
- Years active: 1940–1963
- Labels: Isai Methai, Sangeetha Chakravarthy

Gopalan Ramanathan (died 1963) was an Indian music composer for Tamil movies. He is also known as Isai Methai (Genius of Music) or Sangeetha Chakravarthy (Emperor of Music) and is considered to be one of the influential Tamil music composers to take Carnatic music to the masses. Notable for his association with M. K. Thyagaraja Bhagavathar, G. Ramanathan also composed for films of Salem Modern Theatres and Coimbatore Central Studios. His career lasted until his death in 1963. During the 1950s, G. Ramanathan's music dominated most of the box office hits of the then leading Tamil movie stars Shivaji Ganesan and M. G. Ramachandran.

== Early life ==
G. Ramanathan (GR) was born in Bikshandarkoil, Srirangam, Tamil Nadu, India. GR's biographer Vamanan indicates that his birth year could have been 1910. GR's father was Gopalsamy Iyer who worked as sub-inspector in the Indian Railways. He lost his parents while being young, and was taken care by his elder brother Sundara Bhagawathar. GR could have schooling only until standard 5. He married Jeyalakshmi in 1942 and had two daughters.

He joined the Baratha Gana Saba, a drama troupe and played harmonium at the age of 18. Then he joined the V. A. Chellappa Drama company, and sang playback and played harmonium. In 1932, he first played musical instrument for a Tamil film called Galavarishi which was produced in Bombay.

In 1938 M. K. Thyagaraja Bhagavathar produced Sathyaseelan in Bombay and GR became the music director for that film which followed by the Vipranarayana (old). The first film to be produced in Madras with GR as the music director was Bookailash, followed by Parasuraman and Bhoologa Rambai (old). GR was a resident music director for the Modern Theatres since the beginning except a few which were done by K. V. Mahadevan.

He had acted in Aayiram Thalai Vaangi Apoorva Chinthamani (1947) in the role Sanyasi.

== Style ==
GR never had proper training in carnatic music. It was all Kelvi Gnanam (learning by listening). He had a passion and liking towards carnatic music and went all out in composing. GR became the music director when stage dramas were equally popular in the 1940s. He had to balance up between the cinema and the stage dramas.

It was conditional that the cinema songs of those days had to be composed to the basic carnatic tune and it used to be thought that cinema music would never equal the pure form of carnatic music. GR had proved otherwise when he had composed music for the song "Manmatha Leelaiyai Vendrar Undo" in Haridas sung by M. K. Thyagaraja Bhagavathar. He is a staunch believer that only music that had the carnatic base could endure where most of his songs were "semi classic".

He worked with singers like T. M. Soundararajan, A. M. Rajah, K. J. Yesudas, Seerkazhi Govindarajan, Thiruchi Loganathan, Ghantasala, C. S. Jayaraman, V. N. Sundaram, T. A. Mothi, S. C. Krishnan, P. B. Sreenivas, A. L. Raghavan, P. A. Periyanayaki, M. L. Vasanthakumari, P. Leela, T. V. Rathnam, R. Balasaraswathi Devi, A. P. Komala, Radha Jayalakshmi, M. S. Rajeswari, T. S. Bagavathi, K. Jamuna Rani, P. Susheela, A. G. Rathnamala, N. L. Ganasaraswathi, K. Rani, K. V. Janaki, Soolamangalam Jayalakshmi, Soolamangalam Rajalakshmi, S. Janaki and L. R. Eswari. V. T. Rajagopalan, G. Ramanathan's good friend and assistant, sang few songs for him.

The singing actors M. K. Thyagaraja Bhagavathar, P. U. Chinnappa, M. M. Dandapani Desikar, Kothamangalam Seenu, M. S. Subbulakshmi, D. K. Pattammal, C. Honnappa Bhagavathar, U. R. Jeevarathinam, N. C. Vasanthakokilam, T. R. Mahalingam, T. R. Rajakumari, K. R. Ramasamy, V. Nagayya, P. Bhanumathi, N. S. Krishnan, T. A. Madhuram, T. S. Durairaj and J. P. Chandrababu also sang memorable songs under his compositions.

GR would strive the singers to the excellence. T. M. Soundararajan said "if one could sing to the satisfaction and the tune of GR you could easily sing for the tune of any music director in any part of the world." GR would sing out the songs before recording to guide the singers. His greatest talent was that he was able to compose tunes suiting the storyline as well as the period of production of the films. He produced a film Pudhu Yugam under Sree Saai Gaanaamirudha Pictures in 1954.

GR's last film was Deivathin Deivam (1962) by K. S. Gopalakrishnan. He died of a heart attack in the midst of composing for the film Arunagirinathar. T. R. Pappa completed the composition for the film, which was released in 1964.

== Biography ==
Vamanan had published a biography entitled Sangeetha Chakravarthi G. Ramanathan (2006), which provides details of 85 Tamil movies in which GR had composed music from 1940 to 1969, 12 songs he had sung in Tamil movies and 4 movies in which he had appeared in minor roles.

== Filmography ==
=== Music director ===
Year	Film	Language	Director	Co-Music Directors
1936	Sathyaseelan	Tamil	B. Sampathkumar	Papanasam Sivan
1938	Vipra Narayana	Tamil	A. Narayanan	
1938	Bookailash or Mandodhari Parinayam	Tamil	Sundar Rao Nadkarni	
1940	Bhooloka Rambai	Tamil	B. N. Rao	
1940	Harihara Maya or Bhikshadanar	Tamil	C. V. Raman	
1940	Parasuramar	Tamil	H. S. Mehtha	
1940	Vikrama Oorvasi or Oorvasiytin Kaadhal	Tamil	T. R. Sundaram	
1941	Aryamala	Tamil	S. M. Sriramulu Naidu	
1942	Aanandan or Agni Purana Mahimai	Tamil	S. D. S. Yogi	T. A. Kalyanam
1942	Krishna Pidaran	Tamil	C. V. Raman	
1942	Prithivirajan	Tamil	B. Sampathkumar	
1943	Kubera Kuchela	Tamil	R. S. Mani	background music
1943	Sivakavi	Tamil	S. M. Sriramulu Naidu	Papanasam Sivan
1944	Haridas	Tamil	Sundar Rao Nadkarni	Papanasam Sivan
1944	Jagathalapratapan	Tamil	S. M. Sriramulu Naidu	
1945	Bhakta Kalathi	Tamil	R. Padmanaban	
1946	Aaravalli Sooravalli	Tamil	C. V. Raman	
1947	Aayiram Thalai Vaangi Apoorva Chinthamani	Tamil	T. R. Sundaram	
1947	Ekambavanan	Tamil	B. N. Rao & T. V. Krishnaswami	
1947	Kadagam	Tamil	Acharya	
1947	Kundalakesi	Tamil	Boman D. Irani	S. M. Subbaiah Naidu
1947	Ponnaruvi	Tamil	C. V. Raman	
1947	Rukmangadhan	Tamil	P. S. V. Iyer	
1948	Adhithan Kanavu	Tamil	T. R. Sundaram	
1948	Bhojan	Tamil	T. R. Sundaram	
1948	Lakshmi Vijayam	Tamil	Bomman D. Irani	
1948	Sri Aandal	Tamil	Veluchamy Kavi	S. N. Ranganathan
1949	Deva Manohari	Tamil	A. T. Krishnaswamy	
1949	Inbavalli	Tamil	S. Notani	
1949	Mayavathi	Tamil	T. R. Sundaram	
1949	Mangayarkarasi	Tamil	Jiten Bannerjee	C. R. Subburaman & Kunnakudi Venkatarama Iyer
1949	Rathnakumar	Tamil	Krishnan–Panju	C. R. Subburaman
1950	Ponmudi	Tamil	Ellis R. Dungan	
1950	Manthiri Kumari	Tamil	Ellis R. Dungan	
1950	Parijatham	Tamil	K. S. Gopala Krishnan	S. V. Venkatraman & C. R. Subburaman
1950	Thigambara Samiar	Tamil	T. R. Sundaram	S. M. Subbaiah Naidu
1951	Aada Janma	Telugu	G. R. Rao	S. Dakshinamurthi
1951	Navvite Navaratnalu	Telugu	S. Soundarajan	Aswathama Gudimetla
1951	Devaki	Tamil	R. S. Mani	
1951	Sudharshan	Tamil	Sundar Rao Nadkarni & A.S.A. Sami	
1952	Amarakavi	Tamil	F. Nagoor	T. A. Kalyanam
1952	Amarakavi	Telugu	F. Nagoor	T. K. Kumara Swamy
1952	Kalyani	Tamil	Acharya & M. Masthan	S. Dakshinamurthy
1952	Atthainti Kaapuram	Telugu	Acharya & M. Masthan	S. Dakshinamurthy
1952	The Jungle	English	William Berke & Ellis R. Dungan	
1952	Zamindar	Tamil	P. V. Krishnan	
1952	Shyamala	Tamil	B. A. Subba Rao	T. V. Raju & S. B. Thinakar Rao
1953	Gumastha	Tamil	R. M. Krishnaswami	C. N. Pandurangan & V. Nagayya
1953	Gumastha	Telugu	R. M. Krishnaswami	C. N. Pandurangan & V. Nagayya
1953	Vazha Pirandhaval	Tamil	T. R. Ramanna	S. Rajeswara Rao
1953	Marumagal	Tamil	D. Yoganand	C. R. Subburaman & Viswanathan–Ramamoorthy
1953	Thirumbi Paar	Tamil	T. R. Sundaram	
1953	Inspector	Tamil	R. S. Mani	
1953	Inspector	Telugu	R. S. Mani	
1953	Rohini	Tamil	Kamal Ghosh	K. V. Mahadevan & D. C. Dutt
1953	Rohini	Telugu	Kamal Ghosh	K. V. Mahadevan & D. C. Dutt
1953	Kangal	Tamil	Krishnan–Panju	S. V. Venkatraman
1954	Karkottai	Tamil	Kemparaj	S. V. Venkatraman
1954	Illara Jothi	Tamil	G. R. Rao	
1954	Pudhu Yugam	Tamil	Gopu-Sundar	
1954	Kanavu	Tamil	P. V. Krishnan	V. Dakshinamoorthy
1954	Thookku Thookki	Tamil	R. M. Krishnaswami	
1954	Nanban	Tamil	P. S. Srinivasa Rao	
1954	Veerasundari	Tamil	Jikkade; M. R. Ranganath	Rathinavel Mudaliar
1955	Antha Inthe	Telugu	R. M. Krishnaswami	
1955	Kaveri	Tamil	D. Yoganand	Viswanathan–Ramamoorthy
1955	Nalla Thangai	Tamil	S. A. Natarajan	
1955	Kathanayaki	Tamil	K. Ramnath	
1955	Vijaya Gauri	Telugu	D. Yoganand	Viswanathan–Ramamoorthy
1955	Gomathiyin Kaadhalan	Tamil	P. Neelakantan	
1955	Maheswari	Tamil	T. R. Raghunath	
1955	Doctor Savithri	Tamil	R. M. Krishnaswamy	
1955	Nalla Thangal	Tamil	P. V. Krishnan Iyer	
1956	Amara Deepam	Tamil	T. Prakash Rao	T. Chalapathi Rao & G. N. Balasubramaniam
1956	Amara Deepam	Telugu	T. Prakash Rao	T. Chalapathi Rao
1956	Kokilavani	Kannada	S. A. Natarajan	
1956	Kokilavani	Tamil	S. A. Natarajan	
1956	Madurai Veeran	Tamil	D. Yoganand	
1956	Sahasaveerudu	Telugu	D. Yoganand	
1956	Naan Petra Selvam	Tamil	K. Somu	
1956	Sadhaaram	Tamil	V. C. Subburaman	
1957	Aaravalli	Tamil	S. V. Krishna Rao	
1957	Ambikapathy	Tamil	P. Neelakantan	
1957	Chakravarthi Thirumagal	Tamil	P. Neelakantan	
1957	Karpukkarasi	Tamil	K. Ramnoth & A. S. A. Sami	
1957	Uttama Illaalu	Telugu	K. Ramnoth & A. S. A. Sami	
1957	Manamagan Thevai	Tamil	P. S. Ramakrishna Rao	
1957	Varudu Kavaali	Telugu	P. S. Ramakrishna Rao	
1957	Pudhumai Pithan	Tamil	T. R. Ramanna	
1957	Veera Khadgam	Telugu	T. R. Ramanna	
1957	Pudhu Vazhvu	Tamil	M. K. Thyagaraja Bhagavathar	C. N. Pandurangan
1957	Rani Lalithangi	Tamil	T. R. Raghunath	
1957	Samaya Sanjeevi	Tamil	V. S. Raghavan	
1957	Vanangamudi	Tamil	P. Pullaiah	
1958	Kaathavaraayan	Tamil	T. R. Ramanna	
1958	Karthavarayuni Katha	Telugu	T. R. Ramanna	G. Aswathama
1958	Mangalya Bhagyam	Tamil	T. R. Raghunath	
1958	Sarangadhara	Tamil	V. S. Raghavan	
1958	Sitamgar	Hindi	T. Prakash Rao	B. N. Bali
1958	Uthama Puthiran	Tamil	T. Prakash Rao	
1958	Veera Prathap	Telugu	T. Prakash Rao	
1959	Kalyanikku Kalyanam	Tamil	A. S. A. Sami	
1959	Manimekalai	Tamil	V. S. Raghavan	
1959	Naan Sollum Ragasiyam	Tamil	P. Sridhar Rao	
1959	Chevilo Rahasyam	Telugu	P. Sridhar Rao	
1959	President Panchatcharam	Tamil	A. Bhim Singh	
1959	Veerapandiya Kattabomman	Tamil	B. R. Panthulu	
1959	Veerapandya Kattabrahmana	Telugu	B. R. Panthulu	
1960	Chavukkadi Chandrakantha	Tamil	M. Radhakrishnan	
1960	Kadavulin Kuzhandhai	Tamil	Dada Mirazi	
1960	Raja Desingu	Tamil	T. R. Raghunath	
1960	Thozhan	Tamil	K. Vembu	
1961	Arasilangkumari	Tamil	M. Somasundaram	
1961	Kappalottiya Thamizhan	Tamil	B. R. Panthulu	
1961	Korada Veerudu	Telugu	M. Radhakrishnan	with J. Purushottam
1961	Sri Valli	Tamil	T. R. Ramanna	
1962	Deivathin Deivam	Tamil	K. S. Gopalakrishnan	
1962	Pattinathar	Tamil	T. R. Ramanna	
1963	Chittoor Rani Padmini	Tamil	Ch. Narayana Murthy	
1964	Arunagirinathar	Tamil	T. R. Ramanna	T. R. Pappa
1969	Captain Ranjan	Tamil	T. P. Sundaram	

=== Playback singer ===
Year	Film	Language	Song	Co-singer	Music
1947	1000 Thalaivangi Apoorva Chinthamani	Tamil	Nallathai Sollidaven		G. Ramanathan
1950	Ponmudi	Tamil	Neela Vanum Nilavum Pol	T. V. Rathnam	G. Ramanathan
1950	Ponmudi	Tamil	Van Mazhaiyindri Vadidum Payir Pola	T. V. Rathnam	G. Ramanathan
1950	Ponmudi	Tamil	Nam Jeevaatharame Selvam Agume		G. Ramanathan
1950	Ponmudi	Tamil	Aruyire Premai Amudha Variyil	T. V. Rathnam	G. Ramanathan
1950	Ponmudi	Tamil	Dhesamenggum Nalvalam		G. Ramanathan
1950	Ponmudi	Tamil	Meikadhal Arumbu Vazhvinile Poothathe Indre	T. V. Rathnam	G. Ramanathan
1950	Ponmudi	Tamil	En Kaalamo Marana		G. Ramanathan
1952	Amarakavi	Tamil	Onru Serndhu Paadupattal .. Sevai Seythaale	M. K. Thyagaraja Bhagavathar	G. Ramanathan
1952	Amarakavi	Tamil	Paadharasam Pole		G. Ramanathan
1955	Nalla Thangai	Tamil	Kooli Miga Ketpaar ... Engirundo Vanthan		G. Ramanathan
1955	Nalla Thangal	Tamil	Ithanai Naalaaga Engedi Pone	K. Jamuna Rani	G. Ramanathan
1957	Aravalli	Tamil	Aaravalli Sooravalli		G. Ramanathan
1959	Alli Petra Pillai	Tamil	Ejaman Petra Selvame		K. V. Mahadevan
1959	Manimekalai	Tamil	Vandhaayaa Magale Vandhaayaa		G. Ramanathan
