= Kalvanin Kadhali =

Kalvanin Kadhali (transl. The Thief's Lover in Tamil) may refer to:

- Kalvanin Kadhali (novel), 1937 novel by Indian writer Kalki Krishnamurthy
  - Kalvanin Kadhali (1955 film), an adaptation by S. D. Sundharam
- Kalvanin Kadhali (2006 film), an Indian film by Tamilvannan
