= Minmini (disambiguation) =

Minmini (born 1970) is an Indian playback singer.

Minmini (lit. 'fire-fly' in Tamil) may also refer to:

- Minmini (1953 film), a 1953 Indian Tamil-language film
- Minmini, a working title for the 2017 Indian Tamil-language film Ratsasan
- Minmini (2024 film), a 2024 Indian Tamil-language film
