= Menaka (1955 film) =

- Theatrical release poster
- Directed by: V. C. Subburaman
- Screenplay by: A. T. Krishnaswamy
- Story by: Vaduvur Duraisami Iyengar
- Produced by: V. C. Subburaman
- Starring: K. R. Ramasamy; Lalitha; Ragini; K. Sarangapani
- Cinematography: P. Balasubramaniyam; R. R. Chandran; M. S. Mani
- Edited by: B. V. M.
- Music by: T. G. Lingappa; C. N. Pandurangan; Vedha
- Production company: Kasthuri Films
- Release date: 5 January 1955
- Running time: 182 minutes
- Country: India
- Language: Tamil

Menaka is a 1955 Indian Tamil language film directed by V. C. Subburaman. It is a remake of the 1935 film of the same name, in turn based on the novel of the same name by Vaduvur Duraisami Iyengar. The film stars K. R. Ramasamy and Lalitha. The film was released on 5 January 1955, and emerged a critical and commercial failure.

== Plot ==
The story is about a loving couple getting separated by designs of evil doers. However, after many sufferings, they reunite.

== Cast ==
List adapted from the database of Film News Anandan and from the Hindu review article.

Male cast

- K. R. Ramasamy
- K. Sarangapani
- T. K. Ramachandran
- D. Balasubramaniam
- Acharya
- Friend Ramasami
- T. N. Sivathanu
- M. S. Karuppaiah
- T. V. Sethuraman
- V. P. Balaraman
- V. P. S. Mani
- Omakuchi Narashiman

Female cast

- Lalitha
- Ragini
- C. K. Saraswathi
- M. S. S. Bhagyam
- K. S. Angamuthu
- Indira
- S. K. Venubai
- K. S. Adilakshmi
- K. S. Rajam
- K. S. Chandra

Dance

- Padmini
- Kushalakumari

== Production ==
This is the second edition of the same story by Vaduvur Duraisami Iyengar that he first published as a novel. Then it was staged as a successful play by TKS Brothers. It was made into a film in 1935 with the same title. K. R. Ramasamy who featured in a supporting role in the 1935 film, was the hero in this film.

The film was produced and directed by V. C. Subburaman. Screenplay and dialogues were written by A. T. Krishnaswamy. Cinematography was handled by P. Balasubramaniam, R. R. Chandran and M. S. Mani while the editing was done by B. V. M. V. Ramaraju was in charge of art direction while the choreography was done by V. Madhavan. Still photography was by R. N. Nagaraja Rao.

== Soundtrack ==
Music was composed by T. G. Lingappa, C. N. Pandurangan and Vedha while the lyrics were penned by Kannadasan, Ku. Sa. Krishnamoorthy, A. Maruthakasi, K. P. Kamatchisundaram, K. D. Santhanam and S. D. Sundharam.

Song	Singer/s	Length
"O! Come Come Aiyaa Salaamunga"	P. Leela	
"Aasai Kaaddi Yaengalaagumaa"	Sirkazhi Govindarajan & A. P. Komala	02:34
"Anna Amudham Nee Eppo"		
"Kanavu Ninaivaagumo"	(Radha) Jayalakshmi	03:10
"Manam Polae Ini Vaazhalaam"	K. R. Ramasamy & (Radha) Jayalakshmi	02:41
"Sugamaana Isaiyaagum Vaazhve"	Soolamangalam Rajalakshmi	02:31
"Azhagin Deivam Arivin"	K. R. Ramasamy & Sirkazhi Govindarajan	03:02
"Allahvin Naamathai"	A. M. Rajah	02:49
"Karpanai Ulaginilae"	K. R. Ramasamy	03:19

== Reception ==
Menaka was poorly received by critics, and underperformed at the box office.
