= Thigambara Samiar =

1950 film directed by T. R. Sundaram

- Theatrical release poster
- Directed by: T. R. Sundaram
- Screenplay by: Ko. Tha. Shanmugasundaram
- Based on: Thigambara Samiar by Vaduvur Duraisami Iyengar
- Produced by: T. R. Sundaram
- Starring: M. N. Nambiar; M. S. Draupadi
- Cinematography: G. R. Nathan; D. S. Kotnis
- Edited by: L. Balu
- Music by: G. Ramanathan; S. M. Subbaiah Naidu
- Production company: Modern Theatres
- Release date: 22 September 1950
- Running time: 173 minutes
- Country: India
- Language: Tamil

Thigambara Samiar (transl. Unattired monk) is a 1950 Indian Tamil-language thriller film produced and directed by T. R. Sundaram. An adaptation of Vaduvur Duraisami Iyengar's novel of the same name, the film stars M. N. Nambiar and M. S. Draupadi. It revolves around the efforts of a man to expose the illicit activities of a corrupt lawyer. The film was released on 22 September 1950, and was a box-office success.

== Plot ==
The film revolves around the efforts of Chokkalingam Pillai (Thigambara Samiar) to expose the illicit activities of S. S. Sattanathan Pillai, a deeply corrupt and manipulative lawyer. He ruins lives, cheats his clients, and even attempts to force a young woman to marry his brother.

== Cast ==
Male cast

- M. N. Nambiar as Chokkalingam Pillai
- Narasimhabharathi as Kannappa
- D. Balasubramaniam as S. S. Sattanathan Pillai
- M. G. Chakrapani as Pattabhi Raman
- Azhwar Kuppusami as Sundaram Pillai
- V. M. Ezhumalai as Bandyman
- Karunanidhi as Manickam
- T. K. Ramachandran as Masilamani
- V. K. Ramsamy as Velayudha Pillai
- S. S. Sivasoorian as Namasivayam Pillai
- M. A. Ganapathi as Sanda Marutham
- Srinivasa Gopalan as Chandra's grandfather
- Thirupathi, Mani, Subbaiah

Female cast

- M. S. Draupadi as Vadivambal
- Lakshmiprabha as Alangaram
- C. K. Saraswathi as Anjalai
- K. T. Dhanalakshmi as Chandra's mother
- K. Jayalakshmi as Alangaram's mother
- Baby Lalitha as Chandra
- Kamalam, Kannamma, Saraswathi

Dance

- Lalitha-Padmini
- Kumari Kamala

== Production ==
Thigambara Samiar, an adaptation of the novel of the same name by Vaduvur Duraisami Iyengar, was directed by T. R. Sundaram who also produced it under Modern Theatres. It was a rare heroic role for M. N. Nambiar, who was generally recognized for playing negative roles in Tamil movies. The scenario was written by Ko. Tha. Shanmuga. Cinematography was handled by G. R. Nathan and T. S. Kotnis, and editing by L. Balu. Choreography of the dances was done by Vazhuvoor B. Ramiah Pillai, Madhavan and R. T. Krishnamoorthi.

== Themes ==
According to historian Randor Guy, the film re-uses a theory from the novel, "that if a man is made to stay awake without sleep for three or four days, he will be in a mood to confess everything hidden in his mind".

== Soundtrack ==
The music was composed by G. Ramanathan and S. M. Subbaiah Naidu and the lyrics were written by Ka. Mu. Sheriff, A. Maruthakasi, K. B. Kamakshisundaram, Kannadasan and Thanjai N. Ramaiah Dass. "Oosi Pattasey Oosi Pattasey" is based on "O Dilwalo Dil Ka Lagana Acha Hai" from the Hindi film Patanga (1949) and "Paarudappa Paarudappa Paarudapppa" is based on "Lara Lappa Lara Lappa" from Ek Thi Larki, another 1949 Hindi film.

Songs	Singers	Lyrics	Length
"Mappillai Paar Asal"	P. Leela and Jikki		04:40
"Naathar Mudi Meliruukkum"	P. Leela	Pambatti Siddhar	02:48
"Vaazhvil Thaane Yaavum"	K. V. Janaki		03:10
"Anna Oru Paithiyamaai"	T.R. Gajalakshmi		02:12
"Kaakka Vendum Kadavule"	P. Leela and K. V. Janaki		07:13
"Eppothum Intha Keli Pechu"	U. R. Chandra		02:00
"Sanmarkam Thiyagam"	Master Subbaiah		03:04
"Vaazha Piranthavar Naame"	Master Subbaiah, Chorus		02:30
"Oosi Paattasey"	T.R. Gajalakshmi & V. T. Rajagopalan		02:16
"Paarudappa Paarudappa"	Master Subbaiah		02:59
"Podi Poyendi Sikiram Eduthuvaa"	U. R. Chandra		02:00
"Yen Indha Penn Jenmam"	K. V. Janaki		02:09
"Yen Idam Vizhai Thalam"	P. Leela		03:11
"Yen Adase Azhiga Raja"	P. Leela		02:02

== Release and reception ==
Thigambara Samiar was released on 22 September 1950, and emerged a commercial success.
