= Chinna Annamalai =

Indian film producer, writer, orator, and politician

- Born: Nagappan; 18 June 1920
- Died: 18 June 1980 (aged 60)
- Political party: Indian National Congress

Chinna Annamalai (18 June 1920 – 18 June 1980) was an Indian film producer, writer, orator, and politician known for his contributions to Tamil literature.

== Early life ==
Chinna Annamalai, originally named Nagappan, was born on 18 June 1920, in O. Siruvayal Village near Karaikudi to Nachiyappa Chettiar and Meenakshi.

== Early activism ==
Chinna Annamalai was expelled from Devakottai NSMVPS school for organising a strike to mourn the death of Kamala Nehru, which prevented him from taking his final exams. Concerned about his anti-government activities, his parents sent him to Penang, Malaysia. There, as a teenager, he led estate workers in a protest against local liquor shops, resulting in arson. He was deported back to India after being brought before the Penang magistrate.

== Freedom struggle ==
Back in India, Annamalai joined the freedom struggle in the late 1930s. Influenced by Kalki's writings, he became a popular speaker, drawing large crowds. On 9 August 1942, the day of Gandhi's arrest, he was scheduled to speak at Jawahar Maidan in Devakottai. The police detained him at midnight and imprisoned him in Thiruvadanai Jail, 22 miles away from Devakottai.

News of his arrest spread quickly, inciting anger among the nationalists and young people of Devakottai who marched to Thiruvadanai Jail. They forcibly released Chinna Annamalai, carried him on their shoulders, and returned to Devakottai.

As the crowd approached Devakottai, the British police opened fire. Many volunteers sacrificed their lives to protect Chinna Annamalai. He remained in hiding for a month before surrendering. He was subsequently sentenced to four and a half years of rigorous imprisonment. With the intervention of Rajaji’s arguments and appeals, Chinna Annamalai was released within six months.

== Literary contributions ==
Following his release, Annamalai moved to Chennai on Rajaji's advice and pursued his interests in Tamil literature and music. He founded Tamil Pannai, a publishing firm, to promote books on Congress leaders and Tamil writers, including Rajaji, Kalki, T. S. Chokkalingam, T. K. Chidambaranatha Mudaliar, Namakkal Ramalingam Pillai, Kannadasan, and Vali. He also organized events to support struggling writers, such as a 1944 function for Namakkal Kavignar, where he presented him with ₹20,000.

Annamalai's Tamil Pannai published a book on the Bengal famine, which led to his imprisonment. He ran the weekly magazine Sankap Pantha and published Gandhi's Harijan paper in Tamil.

== Film industry ==
In the film industry, Annamalai wrote scripts for films such as "Thangamalai Ragasiyam", "Naan Yaar Theriyuma" and "Dharmaraja". He founded Vetrivel Films, producing movies like "President Panchatcharam", "Aayiram Roobai", "General Chakravarthi", "Dharmaraja" and "Kadavulin Kuzhandhai". In August 1969, Chinna Annamalai formed and coordinated the All India Shivaji Fans Club.

== Published works ==
- Kandarriyathana Kanden (ta : கண்டறியாதன கண்டேன்)
- Sarkkaraip Pandhal (ta : சர்க்கரைப் பந்தல்)
- Sindhikka Vaikkum Sirippu Kathaigal (ta : சிந்திக்க வைக்கும் சிரிப்புக் கதைகள்)
- Sonnal Namba Maattirgal (ta : சொன்னால் நம்பமாட்டீர்கள்)
- Thalaiezhuththu (ta : தலைஎழுத்து)
- Rajaji Uvamaigal (ta : ராஜாஜி உவமைகள்)

== Books Published by Tamil Pannai ==
- Bharathi Pirandhar by Kalki
- V. O. Chidambaranar by M.P. Sivagnanam
- Avalum Avanum by Ve. Ramalingam
- Sathyamurthi Pesugiraar by S. Sathyamurthi
- Naalai Ulagam by Tyagi Ram. Sadagopan

== Magazines published ==
- Harijan (in Tamil)
- Sivaji Rasikan
- Kumari Malar

== Death ==
Chinna Annamalai died on his Shashthipurti day, marking his 60th birth anniversary, on 18 June 1980, while the holy, sanctified water from the Kalashas (sacred metal pots) was being poured over his head as he sat on a chair.
