= Chandrika (film) =

- Poster
- Directed by: V. S. Raghavan
- Written by: N. P. Chellappan Nair
- Screenplay by: Nagavally R. S. Kurup
- Produced by: K. M. K. Menon
- Starring: Thikkurissy Sukumaran Nair, Nagavally R. S. Kurup
- Cinematography: N. C. Balakrishnan
- Edited by: V. S. Rajan
- Music by: V. Dakshinamoorthy & G. Govindarajulu Naidu
- Production company: Sree Krishna Productions
- Release dates: 24 August 1950 (Malayalam); 29 September 1950 (Tamil)
- Country: India
- Languages: Malayalam; Tamil

Chandrika is a 1950 Indian film, directed by V. S. Raghavan and produced by K. M. K. Menon. The film stars Thikkurissy Sukumaran Nair and Nagavally R. S. Kurup. It was simultaneously shot in Malayalam and Tamil, with the Malayalam version releasing on 24 August 1950, and the Tamil version released on 29 September 1950.

Notice of Chandrika

== Cast ==
- Thikkurissy Sukumaran Nair as Gopi
- Sethulakshmi (Old) as Chandrika
- Nagavally R. S. Kurup
- Gopalan Nair
- Kareepra Balakrishnan Nair
- Padmini
- V. N. Janaki
- Malathi as Vimala
- K. Sarangapani as Prof. Raan
- Kumaran Bhagavathar
- S. P. Pillai
- Aranmula Ponnamma
- K. N. Gopalan Nair as Janardanan Pillai
- M. G. Menon as Mohan
- Saraswathi
- Bharathi (Old) as Malini
- Kamalakshi
- P. K. Vikraman Nair as Radhakrishnan
- T. S. Balaiah

== Soundtrack ==
Music was composed by V. Dakshinamoorthy & G. Govindarajulu Naidu.

Malayalam

Song	Singer/s	Lyricist	Music director
"Anpezhum Priya Thozhikale"	Jikki	Thumbaman Padmanabhan Kutty	V. Dakshinamoorthy
"Choriyuka madhumaari Nilaave"	N. Lalitha	P. Bhaskaran	V. Dakshinamoorthy
"Hello My Dear Ting Ting"	V. N. Sundaram	Thumbaman Padmanabhan Kutty	V. Dakshinamoorthy
"Kezhuka Aathmasakhi "	P. Leela	P. Bhaskaran	V. Dakshinamoorthy
"Ennullam Kaliyaaduthe"		Thumbaman Padmanabhan Kutty	G. Govindarajulu Naidu
"Gaanaamritha Rasa"		Thumbaman Padmanabhan Kutty	G. Govindarajulu Naidu
"Jeevithaanandam Tharum"	P Leela	Thumbaman Padmanabhan Kutty	G. Govindarajulu Naidu
"Lilly Puppy Lilly Puppy"	P Leela	Thumbaman Padmanabhan Kutty	G. Govindarajulu Naidu
"Mannil Mahaneeyam"		Thumbaman Padmanabhan Kutty	G. Govindarajulu Naidu
"Mullavalli Mele"	P Leela	Thumbaman Padmanabhan Kutty	G. Govindarajulu Naidu
"Nonthuyir Vaadidum Jeevithame"	P Leela	Thumbaman Padmanabhan Kutty	G. Govindarajulu Naidu

Tamil songs

Lyrics were penned by P. Bhaskaran.

Song	Singer/s
"Kannil Vilaiyadum"	Jikki
"En Ullam Thulli"	Jikki
"Vinnin Tharai Pole"	P. Leela
"Lilly Puppy Lilly Puppy"	P. Leela
"Malar Ser Manimalai"	N. Lalitha
