= Aanandan =

Anandan or Agni Purana Mahimai
- Film poster
- ஆனந்தன் அல்லது அக்னி புராண மகிமை
- Directed by: S. D. S. Yogi
- Screenplay by: S. D. S. Yogi
- Story by: S. D. S. Yogi
- Produced by: S. D. S. Yogi
- Starring: M. V. Mani; S. D. R. Chandran; B. Saraswathi; Krishnakanth; K. V. Jeeva
- Cinematography: R. M. Krishnaswami
- Music by: K. V. Mahadevan; G. Ramanathan
- Production company: Madras Bharat Studio Movietone
- Release date: 22 January 1942 (India)
- Country: India
- Language: Tamil

Anandan or Agni Purana Mahimai is an Indian Tamil language historical film directed and produced by S. D. S. Yogi with M. V. Mani, S. D. R. Chandran, B. Saraswathi, Krishnakanth and K. V. Jeeva in the lead roles. The film was released in 1942.

== Plot ==
It's a mythological story in which events happened some 2000 years ago. A scheming Rajaguru (King's advisor) tries to destroy a respected priest in the kingdom but finally is punished by Gods.

== Cast ==
Adapted from The Hindu article.

- M. V. Mani as Vasantha Maharaja
- S.D.R. Chandran as Rajaguru Rashtracharya
- B. Saraswathi as court dancer Mohini
- Krishnakanth as priest Aananthan
- K.V. Jeeva as Queen Vasanthi

== Soundtrack ==
Music was scored by K. V. Mahadevan and G. Ramanathan

== Reception ==
The film did fairly well in box-office. Film historian Randor Guy said the film is remembered for "The deft direction by S.D.S.Yogi, good performances by S.D.R. Chandran and B. Saraswathi."
