= General Chakravarthi =

- Poster
- Directed by: D. Yoganand
- Written by: Selvabharathi
- Produced by: Chinna Annamalai
- Starring: Sivaji Ganesan; K. R. Vijaya
- Cinematography: Viswanath Rai
- Edited by: R. Vittal
- Music by: M. S. Viswanathan
- Production company: Vijayavel Films
- Release date: 16 June 1978
- Running time: 146 minutes
- Country: India
- Language: Tamil

General Chakravarthi is a 1978 Indian Tamil-language film, directed by D. Yoganand and produced by Chinna Annamalai. The film stars Sivaji Ganesan and K. R. Vijaya. It was released on 16 June 1978, and emerged a success.

== Plot ==
Chakravarthi is a proud, straightforward, and honest General. He is married to Bharathi and has a daughter, Rani. He gets transferred and intends to take his family with him but they create hurdles and manage to evade going with him. Unknown to him, his daughter is pregnant and the father, Sekar, is believed to be dead. If the General finds out, either he will kill himself in humiliation or will kill his daughter, whom he dotes, in anger or both. How they manage to get the baby out of the way without the father finding out is the rest of the story.

== Cast ==
- Sivaji Ganesan as General Chakravarthi
- K. R. Vijaya as Dr. Bharathi
- Mohan Sharma as Sekar
- Kavitha as Rani
- Thengai Srinivasan as Soman Nayar
- Manorama as Ponnamma
- T. P. Muthulakshmi as Annamma
- Typist Gopu as Hotel owner
- Usilai Mani

== Soundtrack ==
The music was composed by M. S. Viswanathan, with lyrics by Kannadasan.

Song	Singers	Length
"Azhagiya Kiligalin "	Vani Jairam	04:01
"Oh my dear doctor"	T. M. Soundararajan, P. Susheela	04:33
"Nee Enna Kannana"	T. M. Soundararajan	03:52
"Kingini Kingini Kadhal"	L. R. Eswari	03:02
"Who Is The Black Sheep"	T. M. Soundararajan	04:35

== Reception ==
P. S. M. of Kalki said the film should be watched for the performances of Ganesan and Vijaya.

== Bibliography ==
- Dharap, B. V. (1978). Indian Films. Motion Picture Enterprises.
