= Menaka (1935 film) =

1935 film by P. K. Raja Sandow

- Poster
- Directed by: P. K. Raja Sandow
- Screenplay by: Kandhasamy Mudaliar
- Based on: Menaka by Vaduvoor K. Duraiswamy Iyengar
- Starring: T. K. Shanmugam; T. K. Bhagavathi
- Cinematography: Nemai Ghosh
- Music by: T. K. Muthusamy
- Production company: Sri Shanmuganandha Talkie Company
- Release date: 6 April 1935
- Country: India
- Language: Tamil

Menaka is a 1935 Indian Tamil-language drama film directed by P. K. Raja Sandow and produced by Sri Shanmuganandha Talkie Company. The film stars T. K. Shanmugam and T. K. Bhagavathi with N. S. Krishnan (in his cinematic debut), S. V. Sahasranamam, K. R. Ramasamy and T. K. Muthusamy in supporting roles. The film is about two lovers who get separated because of the designs of some envious persons and their reunion after much anguish.

Menaka was an adaptation of the stage play of the same name which itself was adapted from a novel of the same name written by Vaduvoor K. Duraiswamy Iyengar. The film's screenplay was written by Kandhasamy Mudaliar. The film was released on 6 April 1935, was successful at the box-office and became a trendsetter for social-themed films in Tamil.

== Cast ==
The list was adapted from the database of Film News Anandan

Male cast

- T. K. Shanmugam as Naina Mohamed
- T. K. Bhagavathi as Varaswami
- T. K. Sankaran as Sambasiva Iyer
- T. K. Muthusami as Perundevi
- P. K. Diwakar
- N. S. Krishnan as Sama Iyer
- S. V. Sahasranamam
- K. R. Ramasami
- Mohideen

Female cast

- M. S. Vijayal as Menaka
- K. T. Rukmini as Noorjehan
- T. K. Rajasundari
- T. K. Vimala

== Production ==
M. Somasundaram who earlier worked as entrepreneur in Coimbatore decided to venture into film production along with partner S. K. Mohideen. For their debut film, they decided to produce a film adaptation of stage play Menaka which was staged by TKS Brothers for which Somasundaram bought the story rights for ₹16,000. Male actor T. K. Muthusamy portrayed Perundhevi, a widow since no female was willing to shave her their head for the role.

N. S. Krishnan who portrayed a comic negative role in the play reprised the role in the film which also marked his acting debut. During the shoot, he was initially reluctant to be a part of a scene where he was supposed to be tied together with an actress. Krishnan jokingly remarked that "being a chaste man, only his wife should touch him". Rajasandow who understood the humour became friends with Krishnan. The film was entirely shot at Ranjith Studios, Bombay and was completed within 3 months with the cost of ₹80,000 (worth ₹16 crore in 2021 prices).

== Award ==
The film won an award from the Government of the Madras Presidency.

== Remake ==
The film was remade in 1955 with the same title by V. C. Subbaraman. K. R. Ramasamy, who portrayed a comic role in the 1935 version played a leading role in this version. However this version failed to replicate the success of the 1935 version.

== Legacy ==
Menaka was the first Tamil film where a novel was adapted into a feature film and the success of the film also triggered a series of social themed films in Tamil cinema. The film made N. S. Krishnan popular and he went on to become a famous comedian in Tamil.
