= Sivagangai Seemai =

- Poster
- Directed by: K. Shankar
- Written by: Kannadasan
- Produced by: K. S. Ranganathan
- Starring: S. S. Rajendran; S. Varalakshmi; Kamala Lakshmanan; T. K. Bhagavathi; M. N. Rajam
- Cinematography: Thambu
- Edited by: K. Shankar; K. Narayanan
- Music by: Viswanathan–Ramamoorthy
- Production company: Kannadasan Productions
- Release date: 19 May 1957
- Running time: 173 minutes
- Country: India
- Language: Tamil

Sivagangai Seemai (transl. The Land of Sivagangai) is a 1957 Indian Tamil-language historical drama film directed by K. Shankar and written by Kannadasan. Based on the life of the Maruthu Pandiyars, the film stars S. S. Rajendran, S. Varalakshmi, Kamala Lakshmanan and M. N. Rajam. It was released on 19 May 1957.

== Plot ==
After the execution of Veerapandiya Kattabomman on 16 October 1799 at Kayattar, Chinna Marudhu gave asylum to Kattabomman's brother Oomadurai. The British used this reason to invade and attack Sivaganga in 1801 with a powerful army. The Maruthu Pandiyars and their allies were quite successful and captured three districts from the British. The British considered it as a serious threat to their future in India that they rushed additional troops from Britain to put down the Maruthu Pandiyars' rebellion.

== Cast ==
Male cast

- S. S. Rajendran as Muthazhagu
- P. S. Veerappa
- T. K. Bhagavathi
- M. K. Mustafa
- D. V. Narayanasami
- G. Muthukrishnan
- P. S. Venkatachalam
- Raja Wahab Kashmiri as Colonel Welsh
- K. M. Nambirajan
- Dakshinamurthi
- Rathnam
- Karikol Raj
- S. P. Veerasami
- S. A. G. Sami

Female cast

- S. Varalakshmi
- M. N. Rajam
- Kamala Lakshmanan as Chittu
- N. Lalitha
- Kumari Radha
- Jaya
- Sakunthala

Dance

- Sayee–Subbulakshmi

== Production ==
The film began production under the title Oomaiyan Kottai with M. G. Ramachandran starring, but it got shelved as Ramachandran was busy with politics. The same project was revived as Sivagangai Seemai. This was Kannadasan's second home production and he wrote the film's script.

== Soundtrack ==
The soundtrack features 16 songs composed by Viswanathan–Ramamoorthy. Lyrics were by Kannadasan. The song "Kanavu Kanden" is set in Mukhari raga.

Song	Singers	Length
"Saanthu Pottu Thala Thalanga"	P. Leela & K. Jamuna Rani	03:48
"Veerargal Vaazhum Dravidar Naattai"	T. M. Soundararajan	03:26
"Thendral Vandhu Veesaadho"	S. Varalakshmi & T. S. Bagavathi	04:06
"Kannankaruthaa Kili Kattazhagan Thotta Kili"	P. Leela	03:11
"Kanavu Kandaen Naan Kanavu Kandaen" (happy)	T. M. Soundararajan & T. S. Bagavathi	03:32
"Maruvirukkum Koondhal" (traditional verse)	V. N. Sundaram	00:28
"Kanavu Kandaen Naan Kanavu Kandaen" (Pathos)	T. S. Bagavathi	03:02
"Vaigai Perugivara"	C. S. Jayaraman & P. Leela	03:28
"Thanimai Naerndhadho"	S. Varalakshmi	
"Sivagangai Cheemai Sivagangai Cheemai"	T. M. Soundararajan, Seerkazhi Govindarajan & A. P. Komala	03:27
"Kottu Melam Kottungadi Kummi Kotti Paadungadi"	Jikki	03:28
"Chinna Chinna Chittu Sivagangaiyai Vittu"	K. Jamuna Rani	03:12
"Muthu Pugazh Padaitthu"	S. Varalakshmi & Radha Jayalakshmi	05:49
"Aalikkum Kaigal" (one verse)	V. N. Sundaram	00:30
"Megam Kuvindhadhammaa...Imaiyum Vizhiyum"	P. Susheela & dialogues by P. S. Veerappa	04:38
"Vidiyum Vidiyum Endrirundhoam"	T. S. Bagavathi	04:24

== Release and reception ==
Sivagangai Seemai was released on 19 May 1957, delayed from April. Because the majority of male characters in the film had thick moustaches, the Tamil magazine Kumudam called it "Sivagangai Meesai", with "Meesai" meaning "moustache". Kanthan of Kalki said the film was not visually appealing, and overabundant with verbosity. The film was not a success, but because of its theme and historic content, it acquired cult status in later years.

== Bibliography ==
- Dechamma C. C., Sowmya; Prakash, Elavarthi Sathya (2010). Cinemas of South India: Culture, Resistance, and Ideology. Oxford University Press. ISBN 978-0-19-806795-5.
- Rajadhyaksha, Ashish; Willemen, Paul (1998) [1994]. Encyclopaedia of Indian Cinema. British Film Institute and Oxford University Press. ISBN 0-19-563579-5.
