= Sarangadhara (1958 film) =

- Theatrical release poster
- Directed by: V. S. Raghavan
- Screenplay by: S. D. Sundharam
- Based on: Sarangadhara by Gurajada Apparao
- Produced by: Namadeva Reddiar; Annamalai Chettiar
- Starring: Sivaji Ganesan; P. Bhanumathi
- Cinematography: N. C. Balakrishnan
- Edited by: V. S. Rajan
- Music by: G. Ramanathan
- Production company: Minerva Pictures
- Distributed by: Annamalai Corporation
- Release date: 15 August 1958
- Country: India
- Language: Tamil

Sarangadhara is a 1958 Indian Tamil-language historical drama film directed by V. S. Raghavan and written by S. D. Sundharam. The film stars Sivaji Ganesan and P. Bhanumathi. Based on the epic of the same name by Gurajada Apparao, it was released on 15 August 1958.

== Plot ==
King Narendra's young second wife, Chitrangi, becomes infatuated with her stepson, Prince Sarangadhara. When Sarangadhara rejects her romantic advances, the resentful queen falsely accuses him of trying to molest her. Believing the lie, the furious king orders his innocent son's limbs to be amputated in the forest. How fate deals with the king, his second wife and the prince forms the rest of the story.

== Cast ==
Cast according to the opening credits:

Male

- Sivaji Ganesan as Sarangadhara
- S. V. Ranga Rao as Narendran
- M. N. Nambiar as Mahadevan
- Muthukrishnan as Sumandran
- Karunanidhi as Karunanidhi
- Sayeeram as Medhavi
- Venkatachalam as Chitrangadhan
- Harihara Bhagavathar as Rajasekhar
- Santhanam and Ezhumalai as priests
- C. V. V. Panthulu as the poet

Female

- P. Bhanumathi as Chitrangi
- P. Santha Kumari as Rathnangi
- P. Rajasulochana as Kanakangi
- Muthulakshmi as Madhavi
- Mohana as Mallika
- Chandra as Maya

Dance

- Kamala Lakshmanan
- E. V. Saroja

== Production ==
Sarangadhara is the third Tamil film based on the epic of the same name by Gurajada Apparao, following a 1935 film and the 1936 film Naveena Sarangadhara. The screenplay was written by S. D. Sundharam, cinematography was handled by N. C. Balakrishnan and editing by V. S. Rajan. It is Sivaji Ganesan's 50th film as an actor.

== Soundtrack ==
The music was composed by G. Ramanathan. The song "Vasantha Mullai" became hugely popular was later remixed by Mani Sharma for Pokkiri (2007). The song is set in Charukesi raga.

Song	Singers	Lyrics	Length
"Vasandha Mullai Polae"	T. M. Soundararajan	A. Maruthakasi	03:17
"Arputha Kaatchi Ondru Kanden"	P. Bhanumathi	A. Maruthakasi	02:39
"Kanagalaal Kaadhal Kaaviyam"	Jikki & T. M. Soundararajan	A. Maruthakasi	02:38
"Madhiyilla Moorkkorukkor Magimai"	Seerkazhi Govindarajan	A. Maruthakasi	02:19
"Kannaal Nallaa Paaru"	P. Bhanumathi, A. P. Komala & K. Rani	A. Maruthakasi	03:53
"Thannai Marandhaadum En Manam"	P. Susheela	A. Maruthakasi	02:46
"Periya Idatthu Vishayam"	S. C. Krishnan & A. P. Komala	A. Maruthakasi	02:53
"Vandhiduvaar Avar En Manam Pole"	P. Bhanumathi	A. Maruthakasi	02:24
"Megaththirai Pilandhu Minnalai Pol"	T. M. Soundararajan, S. C. Krishnan & T. V. Rajagopalan	A. Maruthakasi	04:01
"Vaazhga Namadhu Naadu"	Seerkazhi Govindarajan	A. Maruthakasi	03:30
"Etti Etti Paakkudhadi Thoppile"	A. G. Rathnamala	A. Maruthakasi	02:51
"Enna Vendum Enakkenna Vendum"	T. M. Soundararajan	A. Maruthakasi	02:40
"Yaedhukkithanai Modi Than"	(Radha) Jayalakshmi	Marimutha Pillai	05:27

== Release and reception ==
Sarangadhara was released on 15 August 1958, and distributed by Annamalai Corporation. Ananda Vikatan negatively reviewed the film, saying it was like watching a play and not an actual film.
