= Thookku Thookki =

- Theatrical release poster
- Directed by: R. M. Krishnaswami
- Screenplay by: A. T. Krishnasamy; V. N. Sambandham
- Based on: Thookku Thookki by Udumalai Narayana Kavi
- Produced by: M. Radhakrishnan
- Starring: Sivaji Ganesan; Lalitha; Padmini
- Cinematography: R. M. Krishnaswami
- Edited by: R. M. Venugopal
- Music by: G. Ramanathan
- Production company: Aruna Films
- Distributed by: K. S. Pictures
- Release date: 26 August 1954
- Running time: 177 minutes
- Country: India
- Language: Tamil

Thookku Thookki (transl. Baggage carrier) is a 1954 Indian Tamil-language historical drama film directed by R. M. Krishnaswami. Based on the play of the same name by Udumalai Narayana Kavi, it stars Sivaji Ganesan, Lalitha and Padmini. The film revolves around a prince who, after hearing about the five maxims of life, goes through numerous adventures to evaluate their validity.

Thookku Thookki is the second film adaptation of the play, following a 1935 film. It was released on 26 August 1954 and became a success, besides winning two Chennai Film Fans' Association awards: Best Film, and Best Actor (Ganesan).

== Plot ==
The king of Sundarapuri advises his three sons to get into business and earn money to save the crippling economy. Sundarangathan is the brightest son while the other two are dimwitted. Hence, the king looks up to him for support to save the country. All the three brothers venture out of their country to do business.

Sundarangathan visits a research centre and listens to the words of pandits. One of them reads out the five maxims of life:

1. A father cares only for the riches earned by his son.
2. Only a mother stands by the son through good and bad times.
3. A sister values her brother only for the gift he brings her.
4. A wife may even kill her husband.
5. A friend in need is a friend indeed.

Sundarangathan is sceptical, and argues with the pandits before deciding to evaluate their validity. Instead of pursuing his business goal, Sundarangathan returns to Sundarapuri to verify the merits of the maxims, but his father again sends him away and prohibits him from returning without riches, convincing Sundarangathan that the first maxim is true.

Sundarangathan visits his mother who warmly welcomes him and is upset to know the reaction of his father. She offers him protection, advises him to stay back in the palace and promises that she will pacify the king. Sundarangathan refuses, but realises the second maxim is true.

Sundarangathan goes to his sister's country. His sister and her husband welcome him warmly. However, on realising that he did not bring any gifts or riches for her, she feels humiliated and disrespects him. Sundarangathan is forced to leave, but realises the third maxim is true.

Sundarangathan meets his wife Prema, who stayed back in her father's kingdom Sorgapuri as Sundarangathan was regularly travelling outside his kingdom. Sundarangathan is not aware that Prema is having an extramarital affair with Seth Namakharam, and is staying back in the place for this reason. Madhivanan, son of the minister and a friend of Sundarangathan, learns of the affair and visits Prema's palace twice to verify the same. However, she lies to Sundarangathan that Madhivanan is misbehaving by coming to her place regularly, misusing his friendship.

Sundarangathan reprimands Madhivanan, who reveals the affair and tells him to check for himself. Sundarangathan infiltrates Namakharam's services as a menial worker and gains his confidence. When Prema invites Namakharam to her palace, Sundarangathan accompanies him. Namakharam presents her a betel leaf, prepared by the worker. She notices that the folding is in Sundarangathan's style. Suspicious, she asks Namakharam who says the worker joined the day before. Prema sends her assistant to kill the worker, convincing Sundarangathan that the fourth maxim is true. He reveals his true identity to Prema and Namakharam.

Prema lies to her father that Sundarangathan attempted to kill her. Sundarangathan, accused of attempted murder, flees to another kingdom where he feigns insanity. However, he attracts the attention of princess Madhavi, who likes his behaviour and arranges for his treatment. When he is "cured", she makes him her and her sister Mallika's baggage carrier. Kattazhagan, their teacher's son, falls in love with Madhavi and demands that she should marry him. Sundarangathan comes to her rescue. The king learns that Sundarangathan is not insane, and that he is the prince of Sundarapuri who is banned there. He arrests Sundarangathan, but after Madhavi pleads, agrees to release him if his innocence is proven.

Sundarangathan is taken to Sorgapuri. When his father-in-law demands to know why he ran away, he is forced to reveal the details of Prema's affair. The king asks for proof. By then, Madhivanan brings Namakharam who confesses all. Prema's assistant also confirms it. Prema realises her mistake and accepts her crime, says that Sundarangathan should marry Madhavi and commits suicide. The king apologises to Sundarangathan and appoints him king. Sundarangathan's father reaches with his wife and sons and apologises for ill-treating Sundarangathan. Madhavi's father offers Madhavi to Sundarangathan. Sundarangathan explains his pursuit to find the validity of the maxims and getting them confirmed. At his request, Mallika marries Madhivanan while Sundarangathan marries Madhavi.

== Cast ==
Male cast

- Sivaji Ganesan as Sundarangathan (Thookku Thookki)
- T. S. Balaiah as Seth Namakharam
- R. Balasubramaniam as Mangalapuri King
- P. B. Rangachari as Swarnapuri King
- G. Muthukrishnan as Madhivanan
- T. N. Sivathanu as Chithran
- S. S. Sivasoorian as Vichithran
- Yadhartham Ponnusami Pillai as Instructor
- Venkatraman as Class Leader (Handsome)
- Venkatachalam as Sundarapuri King

Male cast (continued)

- Ramaiah as Mathanan
- Loose Arumugam as Thookku Thookki
- Dakshanamurthi as Lakshman
- Ramaraj as Scholar
- Veerasami as Scholar
- P. Kalayanam as Sundarapuri Minister
- V. P. S. Mani as Managalapuri Minister
- Kanaiah as Sepoy
- Villan Natarajan as Sepoy
- Shanmugam as Sepoy

Female cast

- Lalitha as Sundarangathan's wife, Prema
- Padmini as Rajakumari, Madhavi
- Ragini as Minister's daughter, Mallika
- C. K. Saraswathi as Sundarapuri Queen
- M. S. S. Bhagyam as Perundevi
- Chellam as Guna Sundari
- Venu Bai as Mangalapuri Queen

== Production ==
Thookku Thookki was an adaptation of the play of the same name by Udumalai Narayana Kavi which was previously made into a film in 1935. The film was directed by R. M. Krishnaswami, who also handled the cinematography, and produced by M. Radhakrishnan. The dialogue was written by A. T. Krishnasamy and V. N. Sambandham. Editing was handled by R. M. Venugopal.

== Soundtrack ==
The music was composed by G. Ramanathan. In less than 12 hours, lyricist Udumalai Narayana Kavi wrote five of the eight songs, which were composed immediately by Ramanathan and rehearsed by the playback singers. T. M. Soundararajan was hired to sing the songs picturised on Ganesan at the recommendation of then popular playback singer Tiruchi Loganathan, and supported by lyricist A. Maruthakasi, with his salary being ₹2,000 (equivalent to ₹200,000 or US$2,100 in 2023). First, Ganesan had objected to introducing a 'new face' and wished to have singer C. S. Jayaraman who had brought recognition for him in his 1952 debut movie 'Parasakthi'. Soundararajan suggested to the Producers of the movie to let him render three songs, and he would leave if Ganesan was not satisfied. After listening to Soundararajan's rendering, Ganesan was impressed and Soundararajan went on to sing many songs for Ganesan. The song "Sundari Soundari" is set in the Carnatic raga known as Kurinji, and "Pengalai Nambaadhe Kangale" is set in Maand.

| Song | Singers | Lyrics | Length |
|---|---|---|---|
| "Eraadha Malaidhanile" | T. M. Soundararajan | Thanjai N. Ramaiah Dass | 03:12 |
| "Inba Nilai Kaana Innum En" | M. S. Rajeswari | A. Maruthakasi | 03:55 |
| "Sundhari Soundhari Nirandhariye" | P. Leela, A. P. Komala & T. M. Soundararajan | A. Maruthakasi | 04:55 |
| "Pengalai Nambaadhe Kangale" | T. M. Soundararajan | Udumalai Narayana Kavi | 02:06 |
| "Pyari Nimbal Mele Namke Majaa" | Chellamuthu & M. S. Rajeswari | Udumalai Narayana Kavi | 03:06 |
| "Abaaya Arivippu Aiyaa Abaaya Arivippu" | T. M. Soundararajan | Thanjai N. Ramaiah Dass | 02:12 |
| "Kuranginilirundhu Pirandhavan Manidhan" | P. Leela, A. P. Komala, T. M. Soundararajan & V. N. Sundharam | Udumalai Narayana Kavi | 05:14 |
| "Sattaam Pillaiyai.... Poongkavin Neengaadha" | T. M. Soundararajan | Thanjai N. Ramaiah Dass | 01:21 |
| "Kanvazhi Pugundhu Karutthinil Kalandha" | T. M. Soundararajan & M. S. Rajeswari | A. Maruthakasi | 03:07 |
| "Aanum Pennai Azhagu Seivadu Aadai" | T. M. Soundararajan | Udumalai Narayana Kavi | 03:44 |
| "Vaaranam Aayiram Soozha Valam Seidhu" | M. L. Vasanthakumari & P. Leela | Nachiyar Thirumozhi | 03:42 |

== Release and reception ==
Thookku Thookki was released on 26 August 1954. Despite facing competition from another Ganesan film released on the same day (Koondukkili), it became a commercial success. The film won two Chennai Film Fans' Association awards: Best Film, and Best Actor (Ganesan).

== Bibliography ==
- Dhananjayan, G. (2011). The Best of Tamil Cinema, 1931 to 2010: 1931–1976. Galatta Media. OCLC 733724281.
- Sundararaman (2007) [2005]. Raga Chintamani: A Guide to Carnatic Ragas Through Tamil Film Music (2nd ed.). Pichhamal Chintamani. OCLC 295034757.
