= Deivathin Deivam =

- DVD cover
- Directed by: K. S. Gopalakrishnan
- Screenplay by: K. S. Gopalakrishnan
- Based on: Jadam by Bilahari
- Starring: S. S. Rajendran; C. R. Vijayakumari; Manimala; S. V. Ranga Rao
- Cinematography: M. Karnan
- Edited by: R. Devarajan
- Music by: G. Ramanathan
- Production company: Chitra Productions
- Release date: 28 December 1962
- Running time: 146 minutes
- Country: India
- Language: Tamil

Deivathin Deivam (transl. God of all Gods) is 1962 Indian Tamil-language drama film, written and directed by K. S. Gopalakrishnan. The film stars S. S. Rajendran, C. R. Vijayakumari, Geetanjali (credited as Manimala) and S. V. Ranga Rao, with music composed by G. Ramanathan. It is based on the short story Jadam by Bilahari. The film was released on 28 December 1962, and emerged a commercial success

== Cast ==
- S. S. Rajendran as Babu
- C. R. Vijayakumari as Kanmani
- Manimala as Annam
- S. V. Ranga Rao as Kanmani's father
- Sandhya as Kanmani's mother
- T. K. Balachandran as Kanmani's brother
- Nagesh
- Manorama

== Production ==
Deivathin Deivam is based on by the short story Jadam by Bilahari that was published in the magazine Ananda Vikatan.

== Soundtrack ==
Music by was G. Ramanathan. The song "Kannan Mananilayai" is a ragamalika, the first raga name being Abheri. The song "Kannanum Driver-um Onnu" was released only on gramophone record. This was Ramanathan's last completed film.

Song	Lyricist	Singers	Length
"Kannan Mananilayai"	Subramania Bharati	S. Janaki	05:27
"Kannukkul Eththanai Vellamadi"	Kannadasan	T. M. Soundararajan	03:24
"Paattu Paada Vaayeduthen"	Kannadasan	P. Susheela	04:09
"Nee Illadha Ulagathile Nimmathi"	Kannadasan	P. Susheela	03:14
"En Aaruyire"	Ku. Ma. Balasubramaniam	P. B. Sreenivas, S. Janaki	03:54
"Annamey Sornamey"	A. Maruthakasi	P. Susheela, S. Janaki	03:17
"Kannanum Driver-um Onnu"		A. L. Raghavan, Renuka	

== Release and reception ==
Deivathin Deivam was released on 28 December 1962, and emerged a commercial success. Kanthan of Kalki praised the film for the cast performances and cinematography.
