= Veerasundari =

- Directed by: Jingade
- Produced by: P. K. Batsha
- Starring: K. B. Janakiram; K. P. J. Sundarambal; Sairam
- Cinematography: M. R. Ranganath; Durairaj
- Edited by: R. Rajagopal
- Music by: G. Ramanathan; Rathinavel Mudaliar
- Production company: Sri Sundari Pictures
- Release date: 30 December 1954
- Country: India
- Language: Tamil

Veerasundari is a 1954 Indian Tamil-language film produced by P. K. Batsha and directed by Jingade. The film stars K. B. Janakiram and K. B. J. Sundarambal. It was released on 30 December 1954.

== Cast ==
The list is adapted from the database of Film News Anandan.

- K. B. Janakiram
- K. B. J. Sundarambal
- Sairam
- Angamuthu
- Kirupanidhi
- Rajam
- Stunt Somu
- Kumari Rajam

== Soundtrack ==
Music was composed by G. Ramanathan and Rathinavel Mudaliar. Only one song sung by A. M. Rajah and M. S. Rajeswari is available.

Song	Singer	Lyrics	Length
Kalaiye Aagum Suvai	A. M. Rajah & M. S. Rajeswari		
