= Mahaveera Bheeman =

- Directed by: S. A. Subburaman
- Screenplay by: S. A. Subburaman
- Based on: Mahabharata by Vyasa
- Produced by: M. L. Pathy
- Starring: T. K. Bhagavathi; S. A. Ashokan; P. V. Narasimha Bharathi; Jayasri; L. Vijayalakshmi
- Music by: M. S. Gnanamani
- Production company: Jai Kumar Pictures
- Release date: 1962
- Country: India
- Language: Tamil

Mahaveera Bheeman (lit. 'The great hero Bhima') is a 1962 Indian Tamil language film written and directed by S. A. Subburaman. Produced by M. L. Pathy under the banner Jaikumar Pictures, the film stars T. K. Bhagavathi, S. A. Ashokan and Jayashree. (Note: Not Jayashree.) It is based on Bhima, a character from the Indian epic Mahabharata.

== Cast ==
The following list was adapted from the book Thiraikalanjiyam Part 2.

Male cast

- T. K. Bhagavathi
- S. A. Ashokan
- P. V. Narasimha Bharathi
- M. L. Pathy
- Pal Sarma
- E. R. Sahadevan
- M. N. Sundar
- S. K. Ramaraj
- T. K. Sambangi
- Gemini Sampath,
- Vijayakumar (child actor)

Female cast

- Jayashree
- L. Vijayalakshmi
- T. R. Rajini
- T. V. Kumudhini
- T. K. Ranjitham
- Sumitra
- K. S. Angamuthu
- Saraswathi
- Kumari Jaya
- Ratna

Guest artistes

- M. R. Radha
- V. Nagayya

== Soundtrack ==
Music was composed by M. S. Gnanamani.

Song	Singer/s	Lyricist	Duration (m:ss)
"Maabhaaratham Ulagil Manidha"	T. M. Soundararajan	Navarasu	
"Arasan Andre Kolvaan"	T. M. Soundararajan	Navarasu	
"Kaanbathellaam Kannan...Thenoorum Malarile"	S. Janaki	Navarasu	
"Puviyaalave Pirandha Bhoopaalaa"	P. K. Saraswathi, Gowsalya & group	Navarasu	
"Un Maayam Ariyaadha Ulagethadaa"	M. K. Sekar	Navarasu	
"Aalahaalamundavaney Aravanthanai Aninthavaney"	M. K. Sekar		
"Odiye Vaa Odiye Vaa"	K. Jamuna Rani	Kambadasan	
"Needhikku Kannillai Enre"	P. Leela	Solairasu	
"Engengum Niraindhirukkum"	P. Leela	Solairasu	
"Enadhullam Magizhnthaadudhe"	P. Leela	Solairasu	
"Kaalai Pozhudhe Namaskaaram"	Sirkazhi Govindarajan	T. K. Sundara Vathiyar	03:28
"Aayathor Nagaraitho"	V. N. Sundaram	Kavi Lakshmanadas	
