= Methavigal =

- Poster
- Directed by: K. Vembu
- Story by: Pattu
- Produced by: V. S. Raghavan
- Starring: T. R. Ramachandran; M. N. Rajam; K. A. Thangavelu
- Cinematography: W. F. Khan
- Edited by: V. S. Rajan
- Music by: G. Govindarajulu Naidu
- Production company: Revathi Productions
- Release date: 27 May 1955
- Running time: 130 minutes
- Country: India
- Language: Tamil

Methavigal (transl. Knowledgeable people) is a 1955 Indian Tamil-language film directed by K. Vembu. It is based on the play of the same name by Pattu. The film stars T. R. Ramachandran, M. N. Rajam and K. A. Thangavelu.

== Cast ==
List adapted from the database of Film News Anandan.

Male cast

- T. R. Ramachandran
- K.A. Thangavelu
- T. K. Balachandran
- M. N. Kannappa
- T. N. Sivathanu

Female cast

- M. N. Rajam
- P. K. Saraswathi
- S. D. Subbulakshmi
- D. K. Pattammal

== Production ==
The film was produced by V. S. Raghavan under the banner of Revathi Productions and directed by K. Vembu. Pattu wrote the story and the dialogues. W. F. Khan and V. S. Rajan were in charge of cinematography and editing respectively. The film's post-production works were done at Modern Cine Lab and Tamil Nadu Talkies.

== Soundtrack ==
Music was composed by G. Govindarajulu Naidu.
