= Kadavulin Kuzhandhai =

- Poster
- Directed by: Dada Mirasi
- Screenplay by: Chinna Annamalai
- Produced by: Chinna Annamalai
- Starring: Kalyan Kumar; Jamuna; M. R. Radha; T. K. Shanmugam
- Cinematography: M. Karnan
- Edited by: Jambulingam
- Music by: G. Ramanathan
- Production company: Vetrivel Films
- Distributed by: Shanmuga Pictures
- Release date: 29 July 1960
- Country: India
- Language: Tamil

Kadavulin Kuzhandhai (transl. God's Child) is a 1960 Indian Tamil-language film directed by Dada Mirasi. The film stars Kalyan Kumar and Jamuna. It is based on the 1960 Chinese film Nobody's Child.

== Cast ==
List adapted from the database of Film News Anandan and the film credits.

Male cast

- Kalyan Kumar
- M. R. Radha
- T. K. Shanmugam
- Nagesh
- Javar Seetharaman
- Pakkirisami
- Kannan
- S. S. Natarajan

Female cast

- Jamuna
- G. Sakunthala
- Lakshmiprabha
- Chitradevi
- S. D. Subbulakshmi
- Baby Mangalam
- Baby Vijaya

== Production ==
The film was produced by Chinna Annamalai under the banner Vetrivel Films and was distributed by Shanmuga Pictures. Dada Mirasi directed the film. Cinematography was handled by M. Karnan while the editing was done by Jambulingam. Screenplay and dialogues were written by the producer Chinna Annamalai. Art direction was by Vardhoorkar. Thangaraj and Jayaraman were in charge of choreography. Still photography was done by R. Venkatachari.

== Soundtrack ==
The Music was composed by G. Ramanathan while the lyrics were penned by Namakkal Kavignar, Ku. Ma. Balasubramaniam, Namakkal R. Balu and K. D. Santhanam.

Song	Singer/s	Lyricist	Length
"Palign Chadukudu"	K. Jamuna Rani & A. G. Ratnamala	K. D. Santhanam	02:40
"Kaithozhil Ondrai Katrukkol"	P. B. Srinivas	Namakkal Kavignar	
"Ilam Thamizha Unnai Kaana"	Thiruchi Loganathan	Namakkal Kavignar	
"Thamizhan Endru Solladaa"	Thiruchi Loganathan	Namakkal Kavignar	
"Chinna Chinna Poove"	P. B. Srinivas & P. Susheela	Ku. Ma. Balasubramaniam	
"Chinna Chinna Poove"	P. Susheela	Ku. Ma. Balasubramaniam	
"Penn Ullam Kadal Vellam"	K. Jamuna Rani & group	Namakkal R. Balu	
"Kannaa Manam Kallo"	P. Susheela	Namakkal R. Balu	04:58
