= President Panchaksharam =

1959 film by A. Bhimsingh

- Theatrical release poster
- Directed by: A. Bhimsingh
- Screenplay by: B. S. Ramiah
- Based on: The Government Inspector by Nikolai Gogol
- Produced by: V. Arunachalam; Chinna Annamalai
- Starring: S. S. Rajendran; S. V. Sahasranamam; B. Saroja Devi
- Cinematography: M. Karnan
- Edited by: A. Bhimsingh
- Music by: G. Ramanathan
- Production company: Savithri Pictures
- Release date: 10 July 1959
- Running time: 162 minutes
- Country: India
- Language: Tamil

President Panchaksharam is a 1959 Indian Tamil-language comedy film directed by A. Bhimsingh and written by B. S. Ramiah. It is based on the play of the same name written by Ramiah, itself adapted from the 1836 play The Government Inspector by Russian Nikolai Gogol. The film stars S. S. Rajendran, S. V. Sahasranamam and B. Saroja Devi. It was released on 10 July 1959 and became a commercial success.

== Cast ==
Male cast

- S. S. Rajendran as Sikhamani
- S. V. Sahasranamam as President Panchaksharam
- T. R. Ramachandran
- V. R. Rajagopal
- D. Balasubramaniam
- D. V. Narayanasami
- Pakkirisami
- Kottapuli Jayaraman

Female cast

- B. Saroja Devi as Panchaksharam's daughter
- S. N. Lakshmi
- T. V. Kumudhini
- N. Chandhini

Dance

- Sayee Subbulakshmi

== Production ==
Playwright B. S. Ramiah adapted Russian dramatist Nikolai Gogol's 1836 play The Government Inspector into a Tamil play titled President Panchaksharam with S. V. Sahasranamam starring. The play, which was produced by Sahasranamam's own company Seva Stage, and had Devika in a key role, was critically acclaimed, and it was adapted into a film with the same title. Sahasranamam, who appeared in the play, returned for the film as well. The film adaptation was directed and edited by A. Bhimsingh, and produced by V. Arunachalam and Chinna Annamalai under Savithri Pictures. Ramiah wrote the screenplay and dialogues. Cinematography was handled by M. Karnan, and the art direction by Chowdhury. The film featured a musical play based on V. O. Chidambaram Pillai. The final length of the film was 14,614 feet (4,454 m).

== Soundtrack ==
The soundtrack was composed by G. Ramanathan.

Songs	Singers	Lyrics	Length
"Intru Netru Vandha"	P. B. Srinivas and K. Jamuna Rani	Kannadasan	05:52
"Mannaadhi Mannan Inge"	P. Susheela	Kannadasan	
"Yaaro Nee Yaaro"	T. M. Soundararajan and P. Susheela	Kannadasan	03:21
"Myna Chittu Manasu"	T. M. Soundararajan	K. S. Gopalakrishnan	02:57
"Naan Suhavaasi, Dhinam Kaiveesi"	Seergazhi Govindarajan	K. S. Gopalakrishnan	
"Oli Padaitha Kanninaayi VaaVaa"	M. L. Vasanthakumari and (Radha) Jayalakshmi	Subramania Bharati	
"Chinna Ponnu Sirikudhu"	A. P. Komala and A. G. Rathnamala	Ku. Ma. Balasubramaniam	
"Azhagu Raani Ponne"	S. C. Krishnan, V. T. Rajagopalan and K. Jamuna Rani	Ku. Ma. Balasubramaniam	
"Desa Sudhanthiram Thedi Vazhangiya"	P. Leela, Soolamangalam Rajalakshmi and group	Ku. Ma. Balasubramaniam	

== Release and reception ==
President Panchaksharam was released on 10 July 1959. Kanthan of Kalki positively reviewed the film for being different from formulaic Tamil films released before. The film was commercially successful, and film historian Randor Guy said it would be remembered for "the interesting screenplay and good performances by Sahasranamam, Rajendran and Saroja Devi."

== Bibliography ==
- Goble, Alan, ed. (1999). The Complete Index to Literary Sources in Film. Berlin: Walter de Gruyter. ISBN 1-85739-229-9.
- Higgins, MaryEllen; Keresztesi, Rita; Oscherwitz, Dayna, eds. (2015). The Western in the Global South. Routledge. ISBN 978-1-138-84312-7.
- Rajadhyaksha, Ashish; Willemen, Paul (1998) [1994]. Encyclopaedia of Indian Cinema. British Film Institute and Oxford University Press. ISBN 0-19-563579-5.
