= Aravalli (film) =

- Theatrical release poster
- Directed by: Krishna Rao
- Written by: V. N. Sambantham
- Produced by: T. R. Sundaram
- Starring: G. Varalakshmi; S. G. Eshwar; Mynavathi; Kaka Radhakrishnan; T. P. Muthulakshmi
- Cinematography: G. R. Nathan
- Edited by: L. Balu
- Music by: G. Ramanathan
- Production company: Modern Theatres
- Distributed by: Modern Theatres
- Release date: 22 October 1957
- Running time: 155 minutes
- Country: India
- Language: Tamil

Aravalli (ஆரவல்லி) (Tamil pronunciation: [aːɾaʋaɭɭi]) is 1957 Indian Tamil-language fantasy action film directed by Krishna Rao and written by V. N. Sambantham. Produced by Modern Theatres, the film stars G. Varalakshmi, S. Mohana, S. G. Eshwar, Mynavathi and Kaka Radhakrishnan playing lead roles, with A. Karunanidhi, T. P. Muthulakshmi, M. S. Draupadi and V. Gopalakrishnan in supporting roles. It was released on 22 October 1957.

In the film, two sisters with magical powers serve as co-rulers of the kingdom of Nellurupattinam. An astrologer forms a plan to depose the two queens in favor of their nephew. The young man wins the right to the throne after completing three challenges, and also marries a first cousin which he loves. But his aunt and new mother-in-law uses her daughter to poison him. The young man dies and is resurrected. He asks King Dharma for the right of revenge, but Dharma orders the execution of the man's wife instead of his aunts.

== Plot ==
In the kingdom of Nellurupattinam, Aaravalli and her sister Sooravalli are the undisputed rulers. They were seven sisters, but the reins of control were in the hands of Aravalli and Sooravalli, who are described as having magical powers. Bheema offers to conquer them, however he is defeated by these women, who also humiliate him and lock him up in prison. However, Bheema manages to escape the prison. Sooravalli visits Indraprasta and she complains to King Dharma about his brother Bheema. Dharma concedes to her demands and sends back his brother to Nellurupattinam.

The astrologer Sahadevan formulates a master plan against the two cunning women. The plan is to use their nephew Alli Muthu, the son of their sister Sangavathy, for the specific purpose of challenging the position of sisters on behalf of the Pandavas. So, Alli Muthu and his companion named as Arayathi set out towards the kingdom Nellurupattinam.

On their arrival in Nellurupattinam, they meet the magician queens who ask Alli Muthu to undergo three challenges. Alli Muthu accepts these challenges and ventures to complete them. Alli Muthu meets Aaravalli's daughter Alangaravalli at the palace and is fascinated by her and eventually they both fall in love. Then, Alli Muthu performs the three challenges and comes victorious with the help of Alangaravalli. As a sign of their submission, the two queens offer their daughter Alangaravalli in marriage to the victorious Alli Muthu.

The newlywed couple and Arayathi arrive at Indraprasta kingdom. The pair make their way into forest where the bride in her innocence, follows the instruction of her mother and gives poisoned sweets to her husband. After first intoxicating his sense with the fragrance of poisoned bouquet, she asks Arayathi for help to discover the dead body of her husband. Arayathi rescues her companion's life. She cursed her wicked mother and Aaravalli agrees all truth. Then, Sahadevan formulates a plan to discuss with Abimanyu and Arayathi, that Alli Muthu's life shall not end. So, Sahadevan wants to know which type of poison was used on Alli Muthu.

Abimanyu and Aryathi get help to Singaravalli, and told her in secret, that the poison is named as Karkotan. Meanwhile, Aaravalli hears the news, so she disguises herself like a woman saint and begs to Dharma for food. Dharma arranges for lunch for her, but she sees Alli Muthu's dead body and the angered saint leaves the house. Then, she was forced to burn Alli Muthu's dead body. King Dharma arranged for the ritual event and set fire to Alli Muthu's body. Fortunately, Abhimanyu reaches at the correct time and saves Alli Muthu's life and curses his defeat. Then Alli Muthu captures the Nelluru Pattinam Kingdom. The two queens and his wife were arrested.

They are tried in front of King Dharma. But the two queens reject the case. So, King Dharma gives punishment to Alli Muthu. Then Alangavalli admitted to all crimes. King Dharma gives judgement to her and Aaravalli. Alangaram's head was to be cut off and her mother was to catch it. Then Alangaram requests to King Dharma, that her head was to be cut off by her husband hands; her mother stops the punishment and approved, Alli Muthu defeats death. Then Alli Muthu reunites with his wife.

== Cast ==
Cast according to the song book and the opening credits.

Male cast

- S. G. Eshwar as Allimuthu
- V. Gopalakrishnan as Abhimanyu
- Kaka Radhakrishnan as Araichi
- A. Karunanidhi as Naman
- K. Natarajan as Dharmar
- S. M. Thirupathisami as Bheeman
- T. N. Sivathanu as King
- Azhwar Kuppusami as King
- K. N. Venkatraman as King
- S. S. Sivasooriyan as King
- Pakkirisami as King
- Nambirajan as King
- K. Sairam as Maragathavalli's husband
- K. K. Soundar as Prisoner
- Singaram as Veeramanni
- V. S. Raju

Female cast

- G. Varalakshmi as Aaravalli
- M. Mynavathi as Alangaravalli
- M. S. Draupadi as Sangavathi
- S. Mohana as Sooravalli
- T. P. Muthulakshmi as Singaravalli
- G. Sakunthala as Maragathavalli
- M. Saroja as Chithravalli

Dance

- K. Rita Devi
- P. T. Saroja

== Production ==
Aravalli was directed by Krishna Rao, produced by T. R. Sundaram and written by V. N. Sambantham.

== Soundtrack ==
Music was composed by G. Ramanathan. Lyrics were written by A. Maruthakasi, Pattukkottai Kalyanasundaram and Villiputhan. The song "Chinna Pennana Pothile" is based on "Que Sera, Sera (Whatever Will Be, Will Be)" from The Man Who Knew Too Much (1956) and "Chinna Kutty Nathana" includes elements of Baila, a Sri Lankan music genre.

Song	Singer	Lyrics	Length (m:ss)
"Aaravalli Sooravalli"	G. Ramanathan		2:58
"Chinna Kutty Nathana"	Thiruchi Loganathan	Pattukkottai Kalyanasundaram	2:05
"Uyirodu Poradum"	C. S. Jayaraman		2:56
"Aambala Un Mel"			2:45
"Thudikkum Yauvanam"; Raga: Kalyani	Jikki		4:27
"Thirumbi Paaru Thambi"	Seerkazhi Govindarajan & Thiruchi Loganathan	Villiputhan (?)	2:11
"Anbe Enthan Munnale"	A. M. Rajah & Jikki		3:22
"Chinna Pennana Pothile"	A. M. Rajah & Jikki	Pattukkottai Kalyanasundaram	2:29
"Maanamellam Ponna Pinne"	Thiruchi Loganathan & T. M. Soundararajan		2:11
"Pengalai Pazhipaavar Yaar"	T. V. Rathnam		
"Sengamma Idhu Angamma"	A. G. Rathnamala, Seerkazhi Govindarajan & Thiruchi Loganathan		3:13
"Ila Meesaiyulla Ambalainga"	T. V. Rathnam & K. Jamuna Rani		3:29
"Kummalam Pottathellam" (F)	T. V. Rathnam & A. G. Rathnamala		3:12
"Kummalam Pottathellam" (M)	Seerkazhi Govindarajan & Thiruchi Loganathan		3:11
"Pazhakkamillatha Kazhuthaikitta"	Thiruchi Loganathan & Seerkazhi Govindarajan	Pattukkottai Kalyanasundaram	2:19
"Maanjal Poosi Varum"	Seerkazhi Govindarajan & Thiruchi Loganathan		3:07
"Adivarum Thendralada"	Seerkazhi Govindarajan		2:58

== Bibliography ==
- Pillai, Swarnavel Eswaran (2015). Madras Studios: Narrative, Genre, and Ideology in Tamil Cinema. India: SAGE Publications. ISBN 9789351502128.
