= Dharma Raja (film) =

- Poster
- Directed by: M. A. Thirumugam
- Screenplay by: M. A. Thirumugam
- Story by: Chinna Annamalai
- Produced by: Chinna Annamalai; V. Arunachalam
- Starring: Sivaji Ganesan; K. R. Vijaya; K. Balaji; Major Sundarrajan
- Cinematography: M. Viswanath Rai
- Edited by: M. A. Thirumugam
- Music by: M. S. Viswanathan
- Production company: Vijayavel Films
- Release date: 26 April 1980
- Country: India
- Language: Tamil

Dharma Raja is a 1980 Indian Tamil-language film, directed by M. A. Thirumugam and produced by Chinna Annamalai. The film stars Sivaji Ganesan, K. R. Vijaya, K. Balaji and Major Sundarrajan. It was released on 26 April 1980, and ran for over 100 days in theatres.

== Cast ==
- Sivaji Ganesan as Dharma Raja
- K. R. Vijaya
- K. Balaji
- Major Sundarrajan
- Thengai Srinivasan
- Manorama
- Pushpalatha
- Geetha

== Production ==
Dharma Raja became Balaji's final film to feature him in a negative role as he became tired of playing such roles. The filming was primarily held at Japan.

== Soundtrack ==
The soundtrack was composed by M. S. Viswanathan, while the lyrics were penned by Kannadasan. The song "Vanavillai Polirukkum" attained popularity.

Track listing
| No. | Title | Singer(s) | Length |
|---|---|---|---|
| 1. | "Gum Gum Gumthalakka" | L. R. Eswari |
| 2. | "Vanavillai Polirukkum" | T. M. Soundararajan, P. Susheela |
| 3. | "Kikkiki Kiliyakka" | S. P. Balasubrahmanyam, Vani Jairam |
| 4. | "Chinnasiriya Japan" | T. M. Soundararajan |

== Reception ==
Kanthan of Kalki lauded Viswanath Rai's cinematography.
