= Kalvanin Kadhali (novel) =

Tamil novel

- Author: Kalki Krishnamurthy
- Language: Tamil
- Genre: Crime; Romance
- Publication date: Serialised: 1937; Paperback: 1954
- Publication place: India

Kalvanin Kadhali (transl. The Thief's Lover) is the debut Tamil-language novel by Kalki Krishnamurthy. It was serialised in the magazine Ananda Vikatan in 1937, and published in paperback form in 1954. The novel was adapted into a play staged in 1953, and a film released in 1955.

== Plot summary ==
Muthaiyan and his sister Abirami are living in a village named Poonkulam. Kalyani who was supposed to marry Muthaiyan, gets married off to a rich person. A heart broken Muthaiyan and his sister leave their home village where circumstances make him an outlaw. He soon becomes a feared dacoit.

Abirami who is now an orphan is taken care by the police inspector's family and is placed in an orphanage in Chennai. In search of Abirami, Muthaiyan travels to Chennai and joins a drama group where he befriends Kamalapathy. Muthaiyan sees his sister from afar and his sister was able to see him during his play. However, they did not interact with each other as Muthaiyan has to flee in order to escape from the police. Kamalapathy later finds Abirami in the orphanage and the two eventually grow closer.

Meanwhile, Kalyani's husband has passed away and she inherits her husband wealth and lands. She becomes a landlord. Under these circumstances, Muthaiyan runs into Kalyani. Kalyani and Muthaiyan reconcile and plan to escape to a different country. Kamalapathy visits Muthaiyan disguised as female and they have a friendly embrace. Kalyani sees this and thinks Muthiyan is betraying her. She reveals Mutthaiyan's hiding place to the police. Muthaiyan dies in the hands of the police. Kalyani grieves her mistake and resorts to a life of prayer and penance. Kamalapathy and Abirami marry each other.

== Background ==
Drawing inspiration from a dacoit in Thanjavur, Kalki Krishnamurthy wrote a story titled Kalvanin Kadhali with the intention of making it a film. Unable to attract investors, he instead published the screenplay as a serial novel in the magazine Ananda Vikatan upon advice from S. S. Vasan.

== Adaptations ==
Kalvanin Kadhali was adapted into a play by the TKS Brothers and staged in 1953. It was also adapted into a film released in 1955.
