= Rohini (film) =

1953 film by Kamal Ghosh

- Theatrical release poster
- Directed by: Kamal Ghosh
- Screenplay by: S. D. Sundaram
- Based on: Krishnakanter Uil by Bankim Chandra Chatterjee
- Produced by: S. Mukherjee
- Starring: S. V. Ranga Rao; Madhuri Devi
- Cinematography: P. L. Rai; H. S. Venu
- Edited by: T. N. Vijaykumar
- Music by: G. Ramanathan; K. V. Mahadevan; T. C. Dutt
- Production company: Madras Art Productions
- Release date: 2 November 1953
- Country: India
- Language: Tamil

Rohini is a 1953 Indian Tamil-language film directed by Kamal Ghosh and produced by S. Mukherjee. It is an adaptation of the Bengali novel Krishnakanter Uil (transl. Krishnakant's Will) by Bankim Chandra Chatterjee. The film was released on 5 November 1953 and failed commercially.

== Plot ==
A wealthy zamindar writes a will disposing of his property. He does not want to give the entire estate to his son who despises his father. The zamindar wants to give a major portion of the estate to one of his close relatives. He has a sister named Rohini, who is a widow. The zamindar's son persuades Rohini to steal the will and put a fake one in its place. She promptly does so, but after learning of the intentions of the zamindar's son, she changes her decision and tries to replace the counterfeit with the original. She is then caught in the act, leading to a chain of events which includes kidnap and murder.

== Cast ==
Credits adapted from The Hindu:

- S. V. Ranga Rao
- Madhuri Devi
- S. A. Natarajan
- S. V. Sahasranamam
- Rajasulochana
- G. Varalakshmi
- C. K. Saraswathi
- T. P. Muthulakshmi
- Lanka Satyam

== Production ==
Rohini was adapted from the Bengali novel Krishnakanter Uil by Bankim Chandra Chatterjee. It was directed by Kamal Ghosh and produced by S. Mukherjee under Madras Art Productions. The screenplay was written by S. D. Sundaram. The cinematography was handled by P. L. Rai and H. S. Venu under the supervision of Ghosh. Hiralal choreographed the dances. The final length of the film was 16,835 feet (5,131 m).

== Soundtrack ==
The soundtrack has three music composers: G. Ramanathan, K. V. Mahadevan and T. C. Dutt, while A. Maruthakasi wrote the lyrics.

Track listing
No.	Title	Music	Length
1.	"Pirandhadhum Enge"	K. V. Mahadevan
2.	"Inaiyilla Evvanam"	G. Ramanathan
3.	"Thanimaiyile Nee Enna"	K. V. Mahadevan
4.	"Idhudhaane Ulagam"	G. Ramanathan
5.	"Perum Sumaiyanen"	G. Ramanathan
6.	"Ennaiyen Marandhayo"	K. V. Mahadevan, T. C. Dutt
7.	"Izhandhein Ellame Vazhvile"	K. V. Mahadevan
8.	"Thendral Veesa Kanden"	K. V. Mahadevan

== Release and reception ==
Rohini was released on 5 November 1953. According to historian Randor Guy, the film was not a commercial success because of "alleged financial problems". However, he praised the storyline, the cinematography, the direction and the cast performances.
