= Thirumbi Paar (1953 film) =

1953 film by T. R. Sundaram

- Theatrical release poster
- Directed by: T. R. Sundaram
- Written by: M. Karunanidhi
- Produced by: T. R. Sundaram
- Starring: Sivaji Ganesan; Pandari Bai
- Cinematography: W. R. Subba Rao
- Edited by: L. Balu
- Music by: G. Ramanathan
- Production company: Modern Theatres
- Release date: 10 July 1953
- Running time: 15616 ft
- Country: India
- Language: Tamil

Thirumbi Paar (transl. Look Back!) is a 1953 Indian Tamil-language film starring Sivaji Ganesan, P. V. Narasimha Bharathi, Pandari Bai, Krishna Kumari and Girija. Produced and directed by T. R. Sundaram of Modern Theatres, the film was written by M. Karunanidhi, who would later become the chief minister of Tamil Nadu. Thirumbi Paar was one of the earliest Tamil films whose dialogues were known to be a political satire on the Indian National Congress, the ruling party then. Sivaji Ganesan played a negative role in the film and received wide acclaim.

== Plot ==
Parandhaman is a womaniser. A mute girl is married to the much older Punyakodi. Parandhaman seduces the mute girl in the absence of her husband and continues this act with other women. Poomalai is Parandhaman's sister.

== Cast ==
Male cast

- Sivaji Ganesan as Paranthaman
- Narsimhabharathi as Pandiyan
- T. S. Durairaj as Karudan
- Thangavelu as Punyakodi
- Karunanidhi as Kundumani
- Thirupathisami as Mill Proprietor
- Krishnan as Office Boy
- Singam Krishnamoorthi as Bhagavathar
- Chellamuthu as Disciple
- Muthukoothan as Disciple
- Krishnan as Lawyer
- Soundar as Inspector
- Srinivasagopalan as Judge
- Ganapathi as Watchman

Female cast

- Pandari Bai as Poomalai
- Girija as Kumudha
- Krishna Kumari as Bama
- Saraswathi as Usha
- Muthulakshmi as Dumb Girl
- Dhanalakshmi as Thangammal

== Production ==
Thirumbi Paar was produced and directed by T. R. Sundaram. M. Karunanidhi, the screenwriter, was then a prominent member of the Dravida Munnetra Kazhagam (DMK). The story of the film was inspired from the story of Ahalya. Sivaji Ganesan, who made his debut through Parasakthi (1952) played antihero roles in most of the films during this period. He continued to act in such roles in films such as Rangoon Radha and Andha Naal, both in 1954. Thirumbi Paar was one of the earliest films written by M. Karunanidhi who belonged to the DMK. The film's dialogues were perceived as a political satire on Indian National Congress, the ruling party then.

== Soundtrack ==
The music was composed by G. Ramanathan.

Song	Singers	Lyrics	Length
"Aavanna Doonaa Aadu"	Jikki	Kannadasan	02:13
"Kanniyargal Vellai Manam Pol"	A. M. Rajah & Swarnalatha	Kannadasan	03:17
"Kalappadam Kalappadam"	S. C. Krishnan	Kannadasan	01:28
"Kaadhalar Vaazhndha Ullaasa Vaazhvil"	Jikki	Kannadasan	02:48
"Kannaale Panpaadum"	Thiruchi Loganathan & P. Leela	Kannadasan	02:55
"Nallavaraam Oru Aanodu Pennum"	T. S. Bagavathi	Kannadasan	02:50
"Kannalla Thoongamma"	P. Leela	Kannadasan	02:57
"Vaazhkai Vaazhvadharkke"	S. C. Krishnan	Kannadasan	02:18
"Pozhudhu Vidindhaal Thirumamam"	A. M. Rajah & T. S. Bagavathi	Kannadasan	02:37
"Kaanagatthil Kaadhaliyai"	D. B. Ramachandra	Kannadasan	00:43
"Paandiyan En Sollai"	P. Leela	Bharathidasan	02:19
"Ponndutthu Padaitthaano"	A. M. Rajah, K. Rani & T. S. Bagavathi		02:58

== Reception ==
The film was a success at the box office. It was lauded mainly for its witty dialogues and political satire. It had a 100-day run in theatres. Sivaji Ganesan's character in—negative role—the film was well received. Years later, in an interview he mentioned Thirumbi Paar was one of the best films that he had acted in his career. S. Viswanathan in his Industrial Economist described the film as "one of the powerful movies M Karunanidhi [MK] scripted".

== Bibliography ==
- Hoiberg, Dale; Ramchandani, Indu (2000). Students' Britannica India: D to H (Dadra and Nagar Haveli to Hyena). Encyclopædia Britannica (India).
- Rathinagiri, R. (2007). Time capsule of Kalaignar. Dravida Munnetra Kazhagam. OCLC 680676772.
- The Illustrated Weekly of India. Published for the proprietors, Bennett, Coleman & Company, Limited, at the Times of India Press. January 1975.
