= Gumastha (film) =

- Film poster
- Directed by: R. M. Krishnasami
- Written by: A. T. Krishnasami (dialogues)
- Screenplay by: Acharya Aatreya
- Story by: Acharya Aatreya
- Produced by: V. C. Subburaman
- Starring: V. Nagayya; Pandari Bai; B. Jayamma; P. V. Narasimha Bharathi
- Cinematography: R. M. Krishnasami
- Edited by: P. V. Manikkam; Bal G. Yadhav
- Music by: C. N. Pandurangam; G. Ramanathan; Nagayya
- Production company: Aruna Films
- Distributed by: Film Center Limited
- Release date: 3 April 1953
- Running time: 184 minutes (Tamil); 187 minutes (Telugu)
- Country: India
- Languages: Tamil; Telugu

Gumastha (transl. Clerk) is a 1953 Indian film starring V. Nagayya, R. S. Manohar and Pandari Bai. The film was produced in Tamil and Telugu languages under the same title. It is based on the play NGO (Non-Gazetted Officer) by Acharya Aatreya. The film was released on 3 April 1953.

== Plot ==
Ranganathan is a government clerk struggling in life with a low salary and a big family. He has to support his aged father, his wife, two children, his brother Gopu and an unmarried sister, Susheela.

Though Gopu is a smart young man, he couldn't continue with his college education due to the financial situation in the family. In the meantime, a rich man's son, Ravi meets Susheela and is attracted to her. Eventually, they both become lovers. Ravi has a medical problem in the heart. The doctor advises him against marriage. But he dismisses it and marries Susheela. She learns of Ravi's medical condition and refuses to be intimate with him. However, one day Ravi forces and make love to her due to which she becomes pregnant.

People, who know about Ravi's medical condition, suspects Susheela as carrying someone else's child. She becomes distressed. Her old father, learning about her plight, dies of shock.

How the government clerk Ranganathan, her brother, solves the problems forms the rest of the story.

== Cast ==
Cast adapted from the songbook

Male Cast

- V. Nagayya as Clerk Ranganathan
- Manohar as Brother Gopu
- P. V. Narasimha Bharathi as Ravi
- Friend Ramasami as Ravi's Friend
- T. N. Sivathanu as Ravi's Father
- M. L. N. Kaushik as Shankar
- C. V. V. Panthulu as Shankar's Father
- T. V. Sethuraman as Friend's Father
- V. K. Karthikeyan as Harmonium Player
- Karuppaiah as Astrologer
- P. Sundarabashyam Naidu as Ranganathan's Father
- Balan as Gupta
- V. T. Kalyanam as Homeowners's Clerk
- Bhairavan as Ranganathan's Son (Adult)
- P. Kalyanam as Ranganathan's Son's Friend
- Anil Kumar as Ranganathan's Son (Child)

Female Cast

- Pandari Bai as Ranganathan's Sister, Susheela
- B. Jayamma as Seetha
- C. K. Saraswathi as Ravi's Mother
- M. Saroja as Pappi
- Menaka as Rani
- Angamuthu as Milkmaid
- Venu Bai as Shankar's Mother
- Baby Uma as Ranganathan's Daughter

== Production ==
The film was produced by V. C. Subburaman under the banner Aruna Films and was shot at Film Centre, Madras.

== Soundtrack ==
Music was scored by C. N. Pandurangam, G. Ramanathan, Nagayya and while the lyrics were penned by A. Maruthakasi and S. D. S. Yogiar.

Song	Singer(s)	Lyricist	Composer
"Aadhari Jegadheeswari Amba"	B. Jayamma	Maruthakasi	C. N. Pandurangam
"Aiyavin Penndattikku"	M. L. Vasanthakumari, K. R. Chellamuthu	S. D. S. Yogi	C. N. Pandurangam
"Aasaiye Veen Aanadhe!"	P. Leela	Maruthakasi	Pandurangam
"Sopalangi Mappillaikku"	Rani, G. Kasthoori & Party	Maruthakasi	G. Ramanathan
"Inbamo! Thunbamo! Edhuvume Nilladhe!"	Raja	Maruthakasi	Pandurangam
"Theeradha Varumaiyudan"	B. Jayamma	Maruthakasi	Pandurangam
"Hey Manidha! Enge Odugirai?"	Nagayya	Nagayya	Pandurangam
"Dance Baby Dance!"	M. L. Vasanthakumari	Maruthakasi	Pandurangam

== Reception ==
According to historian Randor Guy, the film performed average at the box office due its "predictable storyline".
