= Paropakaram =

- Theatrical release poster
- Directed by: Kamal Ghosh
- Screenplay by: Udhayakumar
- Story by: Devaki Bose
- Starring: G. Varalakshmi; Ramesh Sharma; Savithri; Mukkamala
- Cinematography: Kamal Ghosh
- Edited by: Prakash; Kandasamy
- Music by: Ghantasala
- Production company: Shobha Films
- Release date: 9 October 1953
- Running time: 165 minutes
- Country: India
- Languages: Tamil; Telugu

Paropakaram (transl. Willingness to help others) is a 1953 Indian drama film directed by Kamal Ghosh. The film stars Ramesh Sharma and Savithri. It was produced simultaneously in Tamil and Telugu languages with the same title. It was released on 9 October 1953.

== Cast ==
List adapted from the database of Film News Anandan.

Male cast

- Ramesh Sharma
- C. S. R.
- Mukkamala
- Relangi
- C. V. V. Panthulu
- R. Nageswara Rao

Female cast

- G. Varalakshmi
- Savithri

== Production ==
The film was directed by Kamal Ghosh who also handled the cinematography. Editing was done by Prakash and Kandasamy. Devaki Bose wrote the story and Udhayakumar wrote the dialogues. Art direction was done by Kotvankar. R. N. Nagaraja Rao carried out the still photography. The film was shot and processed at Vijaya Vauhini Studios.

== Soundtrack ==
Music was composed by Ghantasala while the lyrics were penned by Kavi Lakshmanadas.

Song	Singer/s	Length
"Jayam Tharum Deivame"	P. Leela	
"Nenjame Povaayi"	Ghantasala	02:47
"Inimaiyaana Samsaarame"	Ghantasala	02:36
"Jodi Maattukkulle"	Ghantasala	02:14
"Manidhaa Nara Janmam"	M. Satyam & group	
"Mano Ullaasa Geethathile...Meikaadhalil"	Ghantasala	03:10
"Ullamadhil Edho Thulli"	P. Leela	02:07
"Ezhaigalin Ulagame"	A. P. Komala	
"Viraindhu Povom"		
"Vaazhve Sogam Thaanaa"	P. Leela, A. M. Rajah, Ghantasala & A. P. Komala	04:09
"Kangal Sorndhu"	P. Leela	03:05
