= Kalvanin Kadhali (1955 film) =

1955 film by V. S. Raghavan

- Theatrical release poster
- Directed by: V. S. Raghavan
- Screenplay by: S. D. Sundharam
- Based on: Kalvanin Kadhali by Kalki Krishnamurthy
- Produced by: P. Rajamanickam Chettiar
- Starring: Sivaji Ganesan; P. Bhanumathi
- Cinematography: N. C. Balakrishnan
- Edited by: V. S. Rajan
- Music by: G. Govindarajulu Naidu; Ghantasala
- Production company: Revathi Productions
- Release date: 13 November 1955
- Running time: 190 minutes
- Country: India
- Language: Tamil

Kalvanin Kadhali (transl. The Thief's Lover) is a 1955 Indian Tamil-language romantic crime film directed by V. S. Raghavan and written by S. D. Sundharam. Starring Sivaji Ganesan and P. Bhanumathi, it is based on the novel of the same name by Kalki Krishnamurthy. The film was released on 13 November 1955 and completed a theatrical run of 80 days.

== Plot ==
At the Poonkulam village, Kalyani and Muthayyan are lovers. Circumstances brand Muthayyan a dacoit, but Kalyani remains steadfast in her love. Evading the police, Muthayyan leads the life of an exile in the forest. When things come to a head, Muthayyan and Kalyani decide to run away to some far-off place and settle down to marital bliss. Muthayyan's loyal friend Kamalapathi, a stage actor, makes all arrangements for their escape. In order to hoodwink the vigilant police inspector Shastri, Kamalapathi disguises himself as a woman and goes to the forest to meet Muthayyan and appraise him of the plans.

When Kalyani comes to the appointed place, she finds Muthayyan embracing another woman. Not realising that it is Kamalapathi whom Muthayyan is expressing his heartfelt thanks to, she suspects her lover's loyalty and runs away in a rage. Inspector Shastri, who is also in disguise, meets Kalyani at this juncture and enquires Muthayyan's whereabouts. Unthinking in her anger, Kalyani blurts out Muthayyan's location. Seeing Shastri run with his gun, Kalyani realises that he is a police officer, and runs after him. Muthayyan is shot dead by the police, and Kalyani commits suicide to reunite with him in death.

== Cast ==
- Sivaji Ganesan as Muthayyan
- P. Bhanumathi as Kalyani
- T. R. Ramachandran as Kamalapathy
- K. Sarangapani as Inspector Saambu Shastri
- T. S. Durairaj as Sangu Pillai
- T. D. Kusalakumari as Abirami
- D. Balasubramaniam as Kalyani's father
- S. R. Janaki as Kamalapathi's mother
- K. R. Chellam as Meenakshi, Shastri's wife
- P. D. Sambandam as Maniyam
- P. S. Venkatachalam as Pannaiyar Pachanatham Pillai
- T. N. Sivadhanu as Ratnam Pillai

== Production ==
Drawing inspiration from a dacoit in Thanjavur, Kalki Krishnamurthy wrote a story titled Kalvanin Kadhali with the intention of making it a film. Unable to attract investors, he instead published the screenplay as a serial novel in the magazine Ananda Vikatan upon advice from S. S. Vasan. In 1949, N. S. Krishnan announced a film adaptation of Kalvanin Kadhali, with C. N. Annadurai as screenwriter, but the project never came to fruition. The film rights to the novel were later acquired by Revathi Productions, who kickstarted the film with V. S. Raghavan as director and S. D. Sundharam as screenwriter.

== Soundtrack ==
The music was composed by G. Govindarajulu Naidu and Ghantasala.

Song	Music	Singers	Lyrics	Length
"Kaalam Varugudhu Nalla Kaalam Varugudhu"	G. Govindarajulu Naidu	T. M. Soundararajan		
"Thamizh Thirunaadu Thannai Petra"	G. Govindarajulu Naidu	M. L. Vasanthakumari & N. L. Ganasaraswathi	Kavimani Desigavinayagam Pillai	02:01
"Ezhuthi Sellum Vidhiyin Kai"	G. Govindarajulu Naidu	T. M. Soundararajan		
"Manadhil Urudhi Vendum"	G. Govindarajulu Naidu	T. M. Soundararajan & P. Bhanumathi	Mahakavi Bharathiyar	02:51
"Manadhil Urudhi Vendum"	G. Govindarajulu Naidu	T. M. Soundararajan	Mahakavi Bharathiyar	00:32
"Nallathor Veenai Seidhe"	G. Govindarajulu Naidu	P. Bhanumathi	Mahakavi Bharathiyar	02:30
"Valaipugum Podhe Thalaivaangum Paambe"	G. Govindarajulu Naidu	T. M. Soundararajan		03:32
"Alli Malar Solai Inba Valli Ival Thaane"	G. Govindarajulu Naidu	P. Bhanumathi, A. P. Komala & K. Rani	S. D. Sundharam	03:38
"Therkatthi Kallanadaa...." (Sadhaaram Naadagam)	G. Govindarajulu Naidu	Thiruchi Loganathan, Sirkazhi Govindarajan & Shanmugasundharam		09:21
"Mannukkeedu Pon Kettaal"	Ghantasala	Ghantasala		02:01
"Veyirkktera Nizhalundu"	Ghantasala	Ghantasala & P. Bhanumathi	Kavimani Desigavinayagam Pillai	02:48
"Veyirkktera Nizhalundu"	Ghantasala	Ghantasala	Kavimani Desigavinayagam Pillai	02;53

== Release ==
Kalvanin Kadhali was released on 13 November 1955, Diwali day. The film was released in five theatres – Gaiety, Mahalakshmi, Sayani, Rajakumari and Prabhat – and completed a theatrical run of 80 days. According to historian Randor Guy, the sequences where Ganesan delivers "long-winding dialogue in high flown Tamil, filled with alliterative phrases" felt incongruous since his character was an illiterate thief.
