= T. K. Chidambaranatha Mudaliar =

Rasigamani T. K. Chidambaranatha Mudaliar
- டி. கே. சிதம்பரநாத முதலியார்
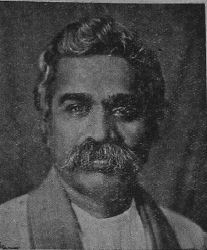
- An image of Chidambaranathan found in Sakthi, a Tamil monthly magazine, dated December 1941

Member of Madras Legislative Council
- In office 1927/28–1930
- Chairman: C. V. S. Narasimha Raju (1926-30)

Personal details
- Born: 18 August 1881 Srivilliputhur, composite Ramanathapuram district, Madras Presidency, British India (now in Virudhunagar district, Tamil Nadu, India)
- Died: 16 February 1954 (aged 72) Madras State (now Tamil Nadu), India
- Spouse: Pichammal (m. 1908)
- Children: Theetharappan (son)
- Parent(s): Meenammal (mother); Theetharappa Mudaliar (father)
- Education: Madras Christian College (BA); Government Law College, Thiruvananthapuram (BL)
- Occupation: Lawyer, writer, politician
- Website: http://rasigamanitkc.org/

Theetharappa Mudaliar Kilankadu Chidambaranatha Mudaliar (1882– 16 February 1954), known popularly as Rasigamani or TKC, was a Tamil scholar from Tenkasi. He was one of the founding authors of Tamil renaissance movement. He had authored Tamil books and Kambar Tharum Ramayanam. He was popularly known as "Rasigamani". He was a member of Madras Presidency Legislative council in 1927. (Diarchy in Madras Presidency)
