= P. V. Narasimha Bharathi =

Indian actor

P. V. Narasimha Bharathi பி. வி. நரசிம்ம பாரதி
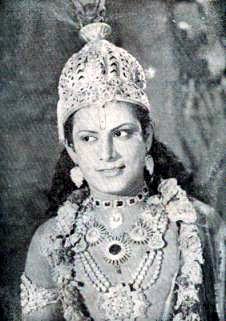
- Narasimha Bharathi in Abhimanu (1948) film
- Born: 24 March 1924; Madhurai, British India
- Died: May 11, 1978 (aged 54); Chennai, Tamil Nadu, India
- Known for: actor, singer

P. V. Narasimha Bharathi (24 March 1924 - 11 May 1978) was an Indian actor. He acted in Ponmudi, directed by Ellis R. Dungan. TMS was searching for cine playback singer to enter. P. V. Narasimha Bharathi who was a friend of T. M. Soundararajan, acted as a hero in around 50 movies. He introduced T. M. Soundararajan as a playback singer in the film Krishna Vijayam (1950). Narasimha Bharathi recommended Soundararajan to S. M. Subbaiah Naidu to recognise his talent. S. M. Subbaiah Naidu finally agreed to give Soundararajan a chance. "Krishna Vijayam" and "Penn Kulathin Pon Villaku".

== Filmography ==
Year	Film
1947	Kanjan
1948	Abhimanyu
1950	Krishna Vijayam
1950	Digambara Samiyar
1950	Ponmudi
1952	En Thangai
1952	Mappillai
1953	Madana Mohini
1953	Muyarchi
1953	Thirumbi Paar
1953	Gumastha
1954	Pudhu Yugam
1956	Kudumba Vilakku
1958	Sampoorna Ramayanam
1959	Pennkulathin Ponvilakku
1960	Naan Kanda Sorgam
1962	Mahaveera Bheeman
