= Vaduvur Duraisami Iyengar =

Indian writer

Vaduvur Duraisami Iyengar (1880 – 1942) was a Tamil writer of detective fiction in the 1940s.

He is one of the pioneer in detective story writing in Tamil language. His protagonist, Digambara Samiar, was a sanyasi or holy man on a mission to fight crime. Some of his works are made into movies such as Menaka (1935 film), Menaka (1955 film).

In 1920 he started a journal called "Manoranjini". The aim of the journal was to propagate the importance of women's education.

== Works ==
His novels are

- Poorna Chandrodayam Part-1,2,3,4,5
- Kumbakonam Vakkil Part-1,2,
- Maya Vinotha Parathesi Part-1,2,3,
- Menaka Part-1,2,
- Soundarya Gokilam Part-1,2,3,
- Madhana kalyani Part-1,2,3,
- Vidhyasagaram,
- Vasantha Mallika.
