= T. K. Bhagavathi =

Indian actor (1917-1982)

- Born: T. K. Bhagavathi; 1917
- Died: 1982 (aged 64–65)
- Occupations: Actor, Drama Artist
- Years active: 1935-1979

T. K. Bhagavathi (1917-1982) was an Indian actor in Tamil stage dramas and cinema. He was the youngest brother of T. K. Shanmugam. He was famous for playing major roles in dramas and films for 45 years from 1935 to 1979. His debut film was Menaka (1935). His majestic walk, body language and bold voice earned him the reputation.

== Early life ==
T.K.S Brothers quartet consisted of four: Sankaran, Muthuswamy, Shanmugam, Bhagavathy. They staged plays all over Tamil Nadu and in neighboring Tamil speaking countries, during the pre-independent period of India. In addition, T.K.Bhagavathi had acted in many character roles such as father and brother in Tamil movies with popular yesteryear heroes and heroines.

== Film career ==
S. V. Ranga Rao and T. K. Bhagavathy were one of the most famous for their father roles in 1960's and 1970's. He has acted along with most of lead actors like M. G. Ramachandran, Sivaji Ganesan, Gemini Ganesan.His notable movie are Sampoorna Ramayanam, Sivagangai Seemai Panama Pasama, En Annan Savaale Samali, Rajapart Rangadurai. His last film was Aarilirunthu Arubathu Varai with Rajinikanth.

== Death ==
He died in 1982 at the age of 65.

== Filmography ==
year	film	role	note
1935	Menaka		Debut movie
1937	Balamani		
1941	Gumasthavin Penn		
1948	Bilhanan		
1953	Manithan		
1953	Inspector		
1954	Ratha Paasam		
1959	Sivagangai Seemai		
1957	Sampoorna Ramayanam	Ravana	
1960	Ellorum Innaattu Mannar		
1962	Mahaveera Bheeman		
1963	Kulamagal Radhai	Sundaresan	
1968	Kuzhanthaikkaga	Dr. Ramanathan	
1968	Uyira Maanama		
1968	Panama Pasama	Nagalingam	
1969	Nam Naadu	Muthaiya	
1970	En Annan	Velappan	
1970	Anadhai Anandhan		
1970	Nilave Nee Satchi		
1971	Thangaikkaaga	Paramasivam	
1971	Sabatham	Selvanayakam/Duraisingam	
1971	Naangu Suvargal		
1971	Savaale Samali	Thirunavukarasu	
1971	Aathi Parasakthi		
1971	Neerum Neruppum	Doctor Arunagiri	
1972	Sange Muzhangu	Pratap Singh	
1972	Vasantha Maligai	Guest Role	
1972	Agathiyar	Devendran	
1973	Sontham		
1973	Rajapart Rangadurai	Vasanthi Father	
1974	Sivakamiyin Selvan	Sankar	
1974	Vani Rani	Ravi Father	
1974	Engal Kula Deivam		
1975	Engal Pattan Sothu	Shanmugam	
1975	Pinju Manam	Ex.Milltry Officer	
1977	Avan Oru Sarithiram	Namachivayam	
1977	Unnai Suttrum Ulagam		
1979	Alaudinum Arbutha Vilakkum	Abdullah (Alauddin's chittappa)	
1979	Aarilirunthu Arubathu Varai	Santhanam's boss	last movie
