= Kalava (film) =

1932 film

- Directed by: T.C.Vadivelu Naicker
- Written by: Pammal Sambandha Mudaliar
- Produced by: Saagar Films
- Starring: V. S. Sundaresa Iyer; D.R. Muthulakshmi
- Music by: G. Sundara Bhagavathar
- Release date: 1932
- Country: India
- Language: Tamil

Kalava is a 1932 Tamil language film directed by T. C. Vadivelu Naicker. It was the first full-length Talkie made entirely in Tamil. The film was based on a play featuring Arjuna, one of the Pandavas.

Cast: P. B. Rangachari, D. R. Muthulakshmi.
