= Muyarchi =

- Theatrical release poster
- Directed by: Joseph Pallippad
- Screenplay by: C. Srinivasan
- Produced by: Joseph Pallippad
- Starring: P. V. Narasimha Bharathi; Revathi
- Cinematography: G. Chandran
- Edited by: G. Viswanathan
- Music by: S. G. K. Pillai; P. Kalinga Rao
- Production company: C. C. Productions
- Release date: 5 June 1953
- Running time: 166 minutes
- Country: India
- Language: Tamil

Muyarchi (transl. Effort) is a 1953, Indian Tamil-language film directed and produced by Joseph Pallippad. The film stars P. V. Narasimha Bharathi and Revathi. It was released on 5 June 1953.

== Cast ==
List adapted from the database of Film News Anandan and from Thiraikalanjiyam.

Male cast

- P. V. Narasimha Bharathi
- V. K. Ramasamy
- K. Sayeeram
- P. A. Thomas

Female cast

- Revathi
- Lakshmiprabha
- Saroja
- Kamaladevi

== Production ==
The film was produced and directed by Joseph Pallippad. C. Srinivasan wrote the dialogues. G. Chandran was in charge of cinematography while G. Viswanathan handled the editing. Art direction was done by G. Ponnusamy and C. Thangaraj was in charge of choreography.

== Soundtrack ==
Music was composed by S. G. K. Pillai while the lyrics were penned by R. Duraisamy Pulavar, S. G. K. Pillai, V. A. Gopalan, Covai C. Archunan and A. M. Rajah.

List of songs

1. "Koolitharum Varundhak Kooli"
2. "Ponnum Mani Pola"
3. "Vichithramaam Vaazhkaiyil"
4. "Thaniyoruvanukku Unavillai"
5. "Thunbam Theerumaa Vaazhvil"
6. "Hai Gulbi Vaango"
7. "Saetril Valarum Thaamaraiye"
8. "Sallaabamaana Anbe"
