= Bikshandarkoil =

Census town in India

Coordinates: 10.8771°N 78.702997°E

Bikshandarkoil, or Pichandarkovil, is a Neighborhood of the city of Tiruchirappalli in Tamil Nadu, India. It is situated in the heart of the city .
