= Manidhanum Mirugamum =

1953 film

- Theatrical release poster
- Directed by: K. Vembu; S. D. Sundharam
- Written by: S. D. Sundharam
- Produced by: V. S. Raghavan
- Starring: Sivaji Ganesan; Madhuri Devi; N. N. Kannappa; T. R. Ramachandran; K. Sarangapani; M. N. Rajam
- Cinematography: N. C. Balakrishnan
- Edited by: V. S. Rajan
- Music by: G. Govindarajulu Naidu
- Production company: Revathi Productions
- Distributed by: Gaiety Pictures Circuit
- Release date: 4 December 1953
- Country: India
- Language: Tamil

Manidhanum Mirugamum (English: Man and the Beast) is a 1953 Indian Tamil-language film, directed by K. Vembu and S. D. Sundharam. The film stars Sivaji Ganesan, Madhuri Devi, N. N. Kannappa and K. Sarangapani. No print of the film is known to survive, making it a lost film.

== Cast ==
- Sivaji Ganesan
- Madhuri Devi
- N. N. Kannappa
- K. Sarangapani
- T. R. Ramachandran
- M. N. Rajam
- S. D. Sundharam
- K. S. Chandra

== Soundtrack ==
The music was composed by G. Govindarajulu Naidu. Lyrics by S. D. Sundharam.

Song	Singers	Length
"Inba Kuyil Kural Inimai"	A. M. Rajah & M. L. Vasanthakumari	03:16
"Imayamalai Chaaralile"	M. L. Vasanthakumari	03:15
"Unnai Ninaikka Ninaikka"	T. R. Ramachandran & Jikki	02:09
"Jegam Yaavum"	Radha Jayalakshmi	06:21
"Kaalamenum Sirpi Seiyyum"	C. S. Jayaraman	02:47
"Oyvillaatha Ulagaththile"	M. M. Mariappa	02:29
"Mottaarukku Battery Pole"	T. R. Ramachandran & Jikki	02:42

== Release ==
Manidhanum Mirugamum was released on 4 December 1953. The distribution rights were initially with Gokilam Pictures, but later transferred to Gaiety Pictures Circuit.
