= S. D. Sundharam =

Indian writer (1921–1979)

- Born: Salem Doraisamy Aiya Sundaram; 22 July 1921; Athur, Salem District
- Died: 10 March 1979 (aged 57); Chennai
- Education: Vidwan (Tamil
- Occupation: Writer
- Known for: Playwright, Screenplay writer, Lyricist
- Spouse: Jayalakshmi Ammal
- Children: 1 Daughter; 3 Sons
- Parent(s): Doraisamy Aiya; Poongodhai Ammal
- Relatives: Professor K. Kannar (Son-inlaw)

S. D. Sundharam also written as S. D. Sundaram, (22 July 1921 – 10 March 1979) was an Indian Tamil playwright, dialogue writer and lyricist. He also co-directed one Tamil feature film and produced and directed one documentary film. He played minor roles in a few films.

== Early years ==
He mastered memorising Tamil poetries such as Athichoodi, Konrai Vendhan, Pattinathar songs and Vallalar's Thiruarudpa. When he was 12 years old, he joined the drama troupe of Nawab Rajamanickam. Observing his proficiency in Tamil literature, Nawab Rajamanickam admitted him to the State College of Arts in Tiruvaiyaru. He graduated from there as Tamil Vidwan in First class.

In 1942 he joined the Independence struggle and was sentenced to 9 months imprisonment at Thanjavur jail.

== Drama career ==
He again joined Nawab Rajamanickam's drama troupe after release from prison. While he was serving his sentence, he wrote a play titled Kaviyin Kanavu (English: Poet's Dream) that was mostly his own dreams about Independence and a better world.

With the blessings of his Guru, he joined Sakthi Krishnaswamy and staged his drama under the banner of Sakthi Naadaga Sabha (English: Sakthi Drama Society). The drama was staged in 1945 with Sivaji Ganeshan, M. N. Nambiar and S. V. Subbaiah in the lead roles.

Kaviyin Kanavu was so popular that in all it was staged more than 1500 times. Once, when the drama was staged in Nagapattinam, the railway arranged a special train called "Kaviyin Kanavu Special" and took passengers from Thiruchi to Nagapattinam.

== Film career ==
He entered the film world writing dialogues for the film Mohini that featured M. G. Ramachandran paired with V. N. Janaki for the first time.

In 1953 he directed the film Manidhanum Mirugamum together with K. Vembu. He also wrote the dialogues and lyrics for the film. Sivaji Ganeshan, K. Sarangapani, Madhuri Devi and T. R. Ramachandran featured in the film.

He produced and directed a documentary film titled Singanaadham Kedkudhu, Cheena Nagam Odudhu during the India - China war of 1962. The film was screened all over Tamil Nadu. All major artistes including Sivaji Ganeshan featured in this documentary.

== Public service ==
- He was elected and served as a member of the Upper House of the Tamil Nadu Legislative Council (upper house) from 1964 till 1968.
- He served as the Secretary of the Tamil Nadu State Iyal Isai Naadaga Manram from 1968 till 1976.

== Accolades ==
- He was conferred with the award for best dialogue writer by the Tamil Nadu State Music and Drama Society in 1965.
- In 1973, then-Prime Minister of India Indira Gandhi awarded him a bronze medal in connection with the 25th anniversary of India's independence. He was given the medal for staging a play titled Veera Suthandhiram commemorating those who died fighting for India's independence.
- He was conferred with the President's Award for best dialogue writer by the Central Music and Drama Society in 1975.

== Publications ==
- Nam Thaai (English: Our Mother) (Play) 1947)
- Vaanamudham - a collection of his poems. Published in the presence of Kannadasan. K. Kamarajar presided over the event. (1964)
- Gandhi Yugam (English: Gandhi Era)
- Kaviyin Kural (English: Voice of (a) poet) (1974)
- Sirippadhikaaram (1974)
- Kaviyin Kanavu (English: (a) Poet's Dream) - 4th Edition (1974)
- Maha Buddhisaaligal (1976)
- Indhiyaa Enge (English: Where is India) (1976)

He also published a monthly magazine titled Ulaga Naadagam (English: World Drama) from 1977

== Filmography as screenwriter and lyricist ==
- Mohini
- Laila Majnu (Telugu film dubbed into Tamil)
- Manidhanum Mirugamum (1953)
- Vipra Narayana (1954)
- Kalvanin Kadhali (1954)
- Kokilavani (1956)
- Sarangadhara (1958)
- Kappalotiya Thamizhan (1961)

== Death ==
He participated in the Vividh Bharati's Thaen Kinnam (Tamil: தேன் கிண்ணம்) program produced by All India Radio, Chennai Station on 8 March 1979. The program was recorded on that date but was broadcast two days later, that was the day he died.

He died on 10 March 1979 due to cardiac arrest.
