= Minmini (1953 film) =

1953 film by T. V. Ramnath and Krishnaswamy

- Poster
- Directed by: T. V. Ramnoth; Krishnaswamy
- Written by: T. S. S. Mani
- Starring: Vijayakumar; Mangalam; Krishna Sarma; Menaka
- Cinematography: V. Rajagopal
- Production company: R. A. S. Dennakone Productions
- Release date: 3 July 1953
- Running time: 148 minutes
- Country: India
- Language: Tamil

Minmini (transl. Glowworm) is a 1953 Indian Tamil-language film directed by T. V. Ramnath and Krishnaswamy. The film stars Vijayakumar and Mangalam. It was released on 3 July 1953.

== Plot ==
The film fictionally depicts the life story of Lakshmikanthan who was a film journalist and the editor of Hindu Nesan.

== Cast ==
List adapted from the database of Film News Anandan.

Male cast

- Vijayakumar
- Krishna Sarma
- T. K. Kalyanam
- Chitra Krishnaswamy

Female cast

- Mangalam
- Menaka

== Production ==
The film was produced under the banner R. A. S. Tennekone productions and directed by T. V. Ramnath and Krishnaswamy. T. S. S. Mani wrote the story and dialogues. Cinematography was handled by V. Rajagopal. P. S. Gopalakrishnan and Sampath Kumar were in charge of choreography. The film was produced at Vijaya Vauhini Studios. R. A. S. Tennekone was a Sri Lankan.

== Soundtrack ==
Lyrics were written by Kalki. (Music composer and playback singers are not known).

List of songs

1. "Maaya Vallavan Kannan"
2. "Aaha Endhan Inbam Neeye"
3. "Sathyame Jayamae Thaane"
4. "Maharaajaave Inge Vaareer"
5. "Yaen Pirandheno Puviyil"
6. "Thagumaa Eesa Idhu Un Thiruvilaiyaadal"
7. "Sugame Tharumae Solaithaan Sobhithame"
8. "Kaadhal Niraindha Vaazhve Vaazhvome"

== Reception ==
An English magazine wrote that Minmini was a horror film that could kill people.
