= V. S. Raghavan (director) =

Indian film director

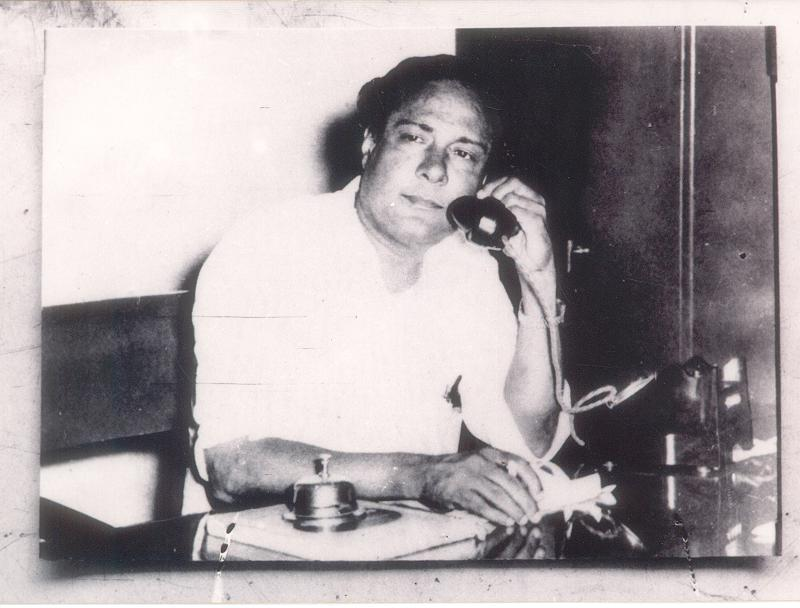
A VERSATILE FILM TECHNICIAN, VERY MUCH SPECIALISED IN AUDIOGRAPHY. Owner of erstwhile Revathi Studios, Chennai

V. S. Raghavan was an Indian film director, producer and audiographer in the 1950s and 1960s in the South Indian film industry. He produced his films under the banner of Revathi Productions and owned a recording studio.

== Career ==
Raghavan directed films including Kalvanin Kadhali (1955), Sarangadhara (1958), Manimegalai (1959), Chandrika (1950 - Malayalam).

He produced 2 films under the banner "Revathi Productions".

Manidhanum Mirugamum (1953)
Methavigal (1955)

V. S. Raghavan was working as the sound engineer in AVM studios and is the pioneer sound engineer in South India. He was trained by C. E. Biggs of Gemini Studios. Satya Harischandra, a Kannada film was dubbed into Tamil. It is the first dubbed film in Tamil cinema. V. S. Raghavan was the audiographer

== Filmography ==
- Kalvanin Kadhali (1955)
- Samaya Sanjeevi (1957)
- Sarangadhara (1958)
- Manimegalai (1959)
- Chandrika (1950) (Malayalam)

== Personal life ==
His full name was V. Srinivasa Raghavan, often simply credited as V. S. Raghavan. (not be confused with actor V. S. Raghavan). His first wife was Jayalakshmi. His second wife lux R. Padma was actress from Tamil film industry.
