= Kamal Ghosh =

- Born: 1910; Bordhwan, West Bengal
- Died: 1983 (aged 72–73); Chennai
- Occupations: Cinematographer, director
- Spouse: Suvarna
- Children: 9

Kamal Ghosh (1910–1983; often misspelled in film credits as Kamaal) was an Indian cinematographer and film director. Although a native of Kolkata, he was active primarily in Tamil and Telugu cinema.

== Early life ==
Kamal Ghosh was the nephew of filmmaker, writer and actor Debaki Bose. He received training in various aspects of filmmaking from his uncle, working with New Theaters, Calcutta (now Kolkata). It was the lawyer turned filmmaker K. Subramanyam who brought Ghosh to South India.

== Career ==
Ghosh started his career as an assistant cinematographer to Sailen Bose in the film Balayogini released in 1937. Ghosh worked as the cinematographer in-charge for the Tamil-language Jupiter Pictures film Anaadhai Penn (1938), directed by R. Prakash. Ghosh's photography, especially the lighting, was widely praised. Ghosh also worked as a director in three films; the unsuccessful Paropakaram and Rohini (both 1953) and the successful Manorama (1959). Due to his limited success as a director, he dropped that career and continued to work as a cinematographer.

== Personal life ==
Ghosh was married to Suvarna, with whom he had six sons and three daughters. Later in his life, Ghosh was affected by glaucoma. He died in 1983.

== Selected filmography ==
=== As cinematographer ===
- Balayogini (1937) – as assistant to Sailen Bose
- Anaadhai Penn (1938) (First film as independent cinematographer)
- Bhaktha Chetha (1940)
- Krishnan Thoothu (1940)
- Harichandra (1944 )
- Kacha Devayani (1941)
- Chandralekha (1948)
- Apoorva Sagodharargal (1949)
- Kaadhal (1952)
- Prema (1952)
- Paradesi (Telugu), Poongothai (Tamil) (1953)
- Anarkali (Telugu) (1955)
- Amara Deepam (1956)
- Kaalam Maari Pochu (1956)
- Nalla Theerpu (1959)
- Maa Babu (1960)
- Kathiruntha Kangal (1962)
- Paruvu-Prathishta (Telugu) (1963)
- Thobuttuvulu (Telugu) (1963)
- Babruvahana (1964)
- Bobbili Yuddham (Telugu) (1964)
- Oonche Log (1965)
- Govula Gopanna (1968)

=== As director ===
- Paropakaram (1953)
- Rohini (1953)
- Manorama (1959)
