= N. S. Krishnan filmography =

Indian actor, comedian, playback singer and screenwriter

Nagercoil Sudalaimuthu Krishnan, popularly known as Kalaivanar (lit. 'Lover of arts') and also as NSK, was an Indian actor, comedian, playback singer and screenwriter in the early stages of the Tamil film industry – in the 1940s and 1950s. He is considered as the "Charlie Chaplin of India."

== List ==
=== As actor ===
Year	Film	Language	Co-stars	Role	Other notes
1960	Raja Desingu	Tamil	MGR, S. S. Rajendran, P. Bhanumathi, Padmini, T. A. Madhuram		This movie was released after his death
1961	Arasilangkumari	Tamil	MGR		
1959	Thozhan	Tamil			This movie was released after his death
1959	Thanga Padhumai	Tamil	Sivaji Ganesan, Padmini	Chinnaiya	
1957	Ambikapathy	Tamil	Sivaji Ganesan, P. Bhanumathi, T. A. Madhuram		N. S. Krishnan died before the completion of this film
1957	Chakravarthi Thirumagal	Tamil	MGR, Anjali Devi, S. Varalakshmi		
1957	Yaar Paiyan	Tamil	Gemini Ganesan, K. Savithri, T. A. Madhuram		
1959	Manimekalai	Tamil	T. R. Mahalingam, P. Bhanumathi, T. A. Madhuram		
1956	Balya Chakram	Tamil			
1956	Asai	Tamil	Gemini Ganesan, Padmini, T. A. Madhuram		
1956	Raja Rani	Tamil	Sivaji Ganesan, Padmini, T. A. Madhuram		
1956	Laila Majnu	Tamil			
1956	Madurai Veeran	Tamil	MGR, P. Bhanumathi, T. A. Madhuram	Cobbler	
1956	Rangoon Radha	Tamil	Sivaji Ganesan, P. Bhanumathi	Naidu	
1955	Kalacharam	Tamil			
1955	Kannin Manigal	Tamil			
1955	Sri Ratna	Tamil			
1955	Athiroopa Amaravathi	Tamil			
1955	Paditha Muttal	Tamil			
1955	Pudhu Vazhvu	Tamil	M. K. Thyagaraja Bhagavathar, Lalitha, Padmini, Madhuri Devi, T. A. Madhuram		
1955	Maha Sakthi	Tamil			
1955	Nan Nambikkai	Tamil			
1955	Governors Cup	Telugu			
1955	Nam Kuzhandai	Tamil			
1955	Kudumba Villakku	Tamil			
1955	Doctor Savithri	Tamil			
1955	Kaveri	Tamil	Sivaji Ganesan, Lalitha, Padmini, T. A. Madhuram		
1955	Mudhal Thethi	Tamil	Sivaji Ganesan, Anjali Devi, T. A. Madhuram	Sathanandam	
1954	Nalla Kalam	Tamil			Directed by Krishnan–Panju
1953	Thalapathi	Tamil			
1953	Nadigan	Tamil			
1952	Amarakavi	Tamil	M. K. Thyagaraja Bhagavathar, T. R. Rajakumari, B. S. Saroja, T. A. Madhuram		
1952	Panam	Tamil	Sivaji Ganesan, Padmini, T. A. Madhuram		
1952	Manathodu Vazh	Tamil			
1952	Thottakkaran	Tamil			
1952	Ragasiyam	Tamil			
1951	Vanasundari	Tamil	P. U. Chinnappa, T. R. Rajakumari, S. Varalakshmi, T. A. Madhuram		
1950	Parijatham	Tamil	T. R. Mahalingam, T. A. Madhuram		
1951	Manamagal	Tamil	Lalitha, Padmini, T. A. Madhuram		
1949	Viswamitra	Tamil			
1949	Rathnakumar	Tamil	P. U. Chinnappa, MGR, P. Bhanumathi, T. A. Madhuram		
1949	Pavalakkodi	Tamil	T. R. Mahalingam		
1949	Inbavalli	Tamil			
1949	Kanniyin Kaadhali	Tamil			
1949	Macha Rekai	Tamil	T. R. Mahalingam, S. Varalakshmi, T. A. Madhuram		
1949	Thambi Durai	Tamil			
1949	Mangaiyarkkarasi	Tamil	P. U. Chinnappa, P. Kannamba, Anjali Devi, T. A. Madhuram		
1949	Nallathambi	Tamil	P. Bhanumathi, T. A. Madhuram	Zamindar	
1948	Chandralekha	Tamil	M. K. Radha, Ranjan, T. R. Rajakumari, T. A. Madhuram		
1948	Samsara Nouka	Tamil			only T. A. Madhuram
1947	Sri Valli	Tamil	T. R. Mahalingam, Rukmini, T. A. Madhuram		
1947	Paithiyakkaran	Tamil	M. G. Ramachandran		
1949	Pavalakkodi	Tamil	T. R. Mahalingam, T. E. Varadhan, T. A. Madhuram		
1947	Brahma Rishi Vishvamitra	Tamil			The film was first released and did not perform well in box-office, then the comedy track was added
1947	Pankaja Valli	Tamil	P. U. Chinnappa, T. R. Rajakumari, T. A. Madhuram		
1949	Krishna Bakthi	Tamil	P. U. Chinnappa, K. R. Ramasamy, T. A. Madhuram		
1947	Kannika	Tamil	T. E. Varadhan, M. S. Sarojini, M. R. Santhanalakshmi, T. A. Madhuram		
1946	Arthanari	Tamil	P. U. Chinnappa, T. R. Ramachandran, T. A. Madhuram		
1946	Deva Dasi	Tamil			
1944	Mahamaya	Tamil	P. U. Chinnappa, P. Kannamba, T. A. Madhuram		
1945	Burma Rani	Tamil	C. Honnappa Bhagavathar, K. L. V. Vasantha, T. A. Madhuram		
1945	Baktha Kalathi	Tamil	C. Honnappa Bhagavathar, K. Thavamani Devi, T. A. Madhuram		
1945	Paranjothi	Tamil	K. Sarangapani, V. A. Chellappa, T. A. Madhuram		
1945	Chow Chow – Kalikala Minor, School Drama, Soora Puli	Tamil			
1945	Saalivaahanan	Tamil	Ranjan, T. R. Rajakumari, M. G. Ramachandran, T. A. Madhuram		
1944	Raja Rajeshwari	Tamil	C. Honnappa Bhagavathar, K. L. V. Vasantha		only T. A. Madhuram
1946	Valmiki	Tamil			
1944	Haridas	Tamil			For the first time in Tamil cinema history, Haridas ran successfully for 110 weeks in Chennai Broadway Talkies. Was screened from 16 October 1944 to 22 November 1946
1944	Poompavai	Tamil	K. R. Ramasamy, U. R. Jeevarathinam, T. A. Madhuram		
1944	Bharthruhari	Tamil	Serukulathur Sama, B. Jayamma		
1944	Jagathalapratapan	Tamil	P. U. Chinnappa, T. A. Madhuram		
1944	Prabhavathi	Tamil	C. Honnappa Bhagavathar, T. R. Rajakumari, T. A. Madhuram		
1943	Aswini	Tamil			
1943	Bagya Lakshmi	Telugu			
1944	Harischandra	Tamil	P. U. Chinnappa, P. Kannamba		
1943	Mangamma Sapatham	Tamil	Ranjan, Vasundhara Devi, T. A. Madhuram		
1943	Sivakavi	Tamil	M. K. Thyagaraja Bhagavathar, S. Jayalakshmi, T. A. Madhuram		
1943	Kubera Kuchela	Tamil	P. U. Chinnappa, T. A. Madhuram		
1943	Arunthathi	Tamil	C. Honnappa Bhagavathar, U. R. Jeevarathinam, T. A. Madhuram		
1942	Emantha Sonagiri	Tamil			
1942	Kathambam	Tamil			
1942	Manonmani	Tamil	P. U. Chinnappa, T. R. Rajakumari, T. A. Madhuram		
1942	Prithiviraj	Tamil	P. U. Chinnappa, A. Sakunthala, T. A. Madhuram		
1942	Panchamirtham (Naadaga Medai & Thiruvaazhatthaan)	Tamil			
1943	Dhaasippen or Jothi Malar	Tamil	T. R. Mahalingam, M. G. Ramachandran, T. A. Madhuram		
1942	Sivalinga Satchi	Tamil			
1942	Kannagi	Tamil	P. U. Chinnappa, P. Kannamba, T. A. Madhuram		
1942	Krishna Pidaran	Tamil	Kothamangalam Seenu, T. A. Madhuram		
1942	Aaraiychi Mani or Manuneethi Cholan	Tamil	P. B. Rangachari, M. R. Santhanalakshmi, T. A. Madhuram		
1941	Iru Nanbargal	Tamil			
1941	Vedha Vathi or Seetha Jananam	Tamil	M. R. Krishnamoorthi, M. G. Ramachandran, T. A. Madhuram		
1941	Chandra Hari	Tamil	T. A. Madhuram		
1941	Izhandha Kadhal (Lost Love)	Tamil	C. S. Jayaraman, T. A. Madhuram		
1941	Ashok Kumar	Tamil	M. K. Thyagaraja Bhagavathar, M. G. Ramachandran		
1941	Aryamala	Tamil	P. U. Chinnappa, T. A. Madhuram		
1941	Alibabavum Narpadhu Thirudargalum	Tamil	T. A. Madhuram		
1940	Sakunthalai	Tamil	M. S. Subbulakshmi, G. N. Balasubramaniam, T. A. Madhuram, T. S. Durairaj		
1940	Parasuramar	Tamil	U. R. Jeevarathinam, T. A. Madhuram		
1940	Manimekalai or Bala Saniyasi	Tamil	K. B. Sundarambal, Kothamangalam Seenu, T. A. Madhuram		In those days there were movies that had 2 titles
1940	Bhoologa Rambai	Tamil	T. K. Shanmugam, K. L. V. Vasantha, T. A. Madhuram		
1940	Sathi Murali	Tamil	M. K. Radha, M. R. Santhanalakshmi, T. A. Madhuram		
1942	Naveena Vikramadityan or Buddhimaan Balavaan Avaan	Tamil	T. A. Madhuram		First ever spoof movie in Tamil. Trolled a movie named Vikramadityan
1940	Chandraguptha Chanakya	Tamil	N. C. Vasanthakokilam, T. A. Madhuram		
1940	Tharuthalai Thangavelu	Tamil	T. A. Madhuram		
1940	Naveena Tenali Raman	Tamil	T. A. Madhuram		
1940	Uthama Puthiran	Tamil	P. U. Chinnappa, M. V. Rajamma, T. A. Madhuram		
1940	Sirikkathe	Tamil			Consist of five stories under one single title (an innovative idea in those days) the titles where:Adangka Pidari, Puli Vettai, Poli Panchali, Malai Kannan, Yama Vathanai
1940	Kalamegam	Tamil	T. N. Rajarathnam, S. P. L. Dhanalakshmi, T. A. Madhuram		
1939	Prahaladha	Tamil	T. R. Mahalingam, M. R. Santhanalakshmi, R. Balasubramaniam, M. G. Ramachandran		
1939	Rambaiyin Kaadhal	Tamil	K. Sarangapani, K. L. V. Vasantha, T. A. Madhuram		
1939	Pommi Kalyanam	Tamil			
1939	Madurai Veeran	Tamil			
1939	Sri Math Ramalinga Swamigal	Tamil			
1939	Maya Machindra	Tamil	M. K. Radha, M. G. Ramachandran		
1939	Manikkavasagar	Tamil	M. M. Dandapani Desikar		
1939	Thiruneelakantar	Tamil	M. K. Thyagaraja Bhagavathar		
1939	Aanandha Ashramam	Tamil	P. B. Rangachari, C. V. V. Panthulu		
1940	Krishnan Thoothu	Tamil	Serukulathur Sama, P. Kannamba, T. A. Madhuram		
1938	Dakshayagnam	Tamil	V. A. Chelappa, M. M. Radhabai		
1937	Balamani	Tamil			
1936	Chandra Kantha	Tamil	Kali N. Rathnam, P. U. Chinnappa		
1937	Baktha Thulasidass	Tamil			
1937	Ambikapathy	Tamil	M. K. Thyagaraja Bhagavathar		
1936	Vasantha Sena	Tamil	V. A. Chellappa, S. P. L. Dhanalakshmi, M. S. Vijayal		
1936	Sathi Leelavathi	Tamil	M. K. Radha, MGR		
1935	Menaka	Tamil	T. K. Shanmugam, T. K. Baghavathi, T. K. Sankaran, T. K. Muthurswamy		

=== As director ===
- Panam (1952) – Dialogues by M Karunanidhi
- Manamagal (1951) – Dialogues by M Karunanidhi
- Pelli Koothuru (1951)
