= List of Tamil films of 1949 =

The following is a list of films produced in the Tamil film industry in India in 1949, in alphabetical order.

== 1949 ==
Title	Director	Production	Music	Cast	Release date (D-M-Y)
Apoorva Sagodharargal	Acharya	Gemini Studios	S. Rajeswara Rao; M. D. Parthasarathy; R. Vaidyanathan	M. K. Radha, P. Bhanumathi, R. Nagendra Rao, L. Narayana Rao, G. Pattu Iyer, D. Balasubramaniam, Lakshmi Prabha, Surya Prabha, Stunt Somu	21-10-1949
Deva Manohari	A. T. Krishnaswamy	R. K. S. Pictures	G. Ramanathan	C. Honnappa Bhagavathar, P. Bhanumathi, B. S. Saroja, M. R. Swaminathan, Kali N. Rathnam, G. M. Basheer, R. Padma, Lakshmi Devi	21-10-1949
Geetha Gandhi	K. Subramanyam	Madras United Artists Corporation	C. N. Pandurangan; Br Lakshmanan	B. S. Saroja, P. A. Periyanayaki, T. R. Ramachandran, K. Subramanyam, V. Kumaraswami, Baby Padma, M. R. S. Mani, R. Padma	16-03-1949
Inbavalli	S. Nottani	Shyamala Pictures	G. Ramanathan	T. R. Mahalingam, B. S. Saroja, N. S. Krishnan, T. A. Madhuram, M. R. Swaminathan, E. R. Sahadevan, P. K. Saraswathi, S. Menaka	16-09-1949
Kanniyin Kathali	K. Ramnoth	Jupiter Pictures	S. M. Subbaiah Naidu; C. R. Subburaman	Madhuri Devi, Anjali Devi, S. A. Natarajan, N. S. Krishnan, T. A. Madhuram, K. R. Ramsingh, K. Sarangapani, Pulimoottai Ramaswami, M. S. S. Bhagyam	06-08-1949
Kanakangi		State Productions		Gangadharan, Srinivasan, Leela	29-07-1949
Krishna Bhakthi	R. S. Mani	Krishna Pictures	S. V. Venkatraman	P. U. Chinnappa, T. R. Rajakumari, K. R. Ramasamy, S. P. L. Dhanalakshmi, D. Balasubramaniam, N. S. Krishnan, T. A. Madhuram, C. T. Rajakantham, P. A. Periyanayaki	14-01-1949
Laila Majnu (dubbed from Telugu)	P. S. Ramakrishna Rao	Bharani Studios	C. R. Subburaman	A. Nageswara Rao, P. Bhanumathi, Mukkamala, C. S. R. Anjaneyulu, Sriranjani, Kasturi Siva Rao, Arani Satyanarayana	01-10-1949
Mayakkudirai (dubbed from Telugu)	Raja of Mirzapur	Sobhanachala Pictures	Ghantasala	A. Nageswara Rao, Anjali Devi, A. V. Subba Rao, Relangi, T. Kanakam, Suryashree, Lakshmirajyam Jr., Surabhi Kamalabai	
Mayavathi	T. R. Sundaram	Ganapathi Pictures	G. Ramanathan	T. R. Mahalingam, Anjali Devi, S. V. Subbaiah, Kali N. Rathnam, C. T. Rajakantham, K. K. Perumal, M. G. Chakrapani	12-08-1949
Mangayarkarasi	Jiten Bannerjee	Bhagya Pictures	G. Ramanathan; Kunnakudi Venkatarama Iyer; C. R. Subburaman	P. U. Chinnappa, P. Kannamba, Anjali Devi, N. S. Krishnan, T. S. Durairaj, T. A. Madhuram, Kaka Radhakrishnan	03-09-1949
Naattiya Rani	B. N. Rao	Baskar Pictures	Papanasam Sivan	Vasundhara Devi, B. S. Raja Iyengar, B. S. Saroja, T. S. Balaiah, Charli, B. Jayamma, K. Thavamani Devi	19-08-1949
Nallathambi	Krishnan–Panju	Uma Pictures; N. S. K. Films	C. R. Subburaman	N. S. Krishnan, P. Bhanumathi, T. A. Madhuram, S. V. Sahasranamam, M. N. Rajam, V. K. Ramasamy	04-02-1949
Nam Naadu	V. Shantaram	Rajkamal Kalamandir	G. Govindarajulu Naidu	Pushpa Hans, Umesh Sharma, Sudha Apte, Chandrasekhar, Manmohan Krishna, Keshavrao Date	09-07-1949
Navajeevanam	K. B. Nagabhushanam	Raja Rajeswari Films	S. V. Venkatraman	V. Nagayya, P. Kannamba, Sriram, S. Varalakshmi, T. R. Ramachandran, T. A. Jayalakshmi, L. Narayana Rao, C. V. V. Panthulu, Baby Rajamani	28-05-1949
Pavalakodi	S. M. Sriramulu Naidu	Pakshiraja Studios	C. R. Subburaman	T. R. Mahalingam, T. R. Rajakumari, T. E. Varadhan, M. S. Sarojini, N. S. Krishnan, T. A. Madhuram, Nagercoil K. Mahadevan, M. N. Rajam	09-04-1949
Ratnakumar	Krishnan–Panju	Murugan Talkies	G. Ramanathan; C. R. Subburaman	P. U. Chinnappa, P. Bhanumathi, M. G. Ramachandran, K. Malathi, N. S. Krishnan, T. A. Madhuram, D. Balasubramaniam, Nagercoil K. Mahadevan, K. P. Kesavan, T. S. Durairaj	15-12-1949
Vazhkai	A. V. Meiyappan	AVM Productions	R. Sudharsanam	Vyjayanthimala, M. S. Draupadi, T. R. Ramachandran, S. V. Sahasranamam, K. Sarangapani, P. A. Subbaiah Pillai, M. S. Karuppaiah, V. M. Ezhumalai, S. R. Janaki	22-12-1949
Velaikari	A. S. A. Sami	Jupiter Pictures	S. M. Subbaiah Naidu; C. R. Subburaman	K. R. Ramasamy, V. N. Janaki, T. S. Balaiah, M. N. Nambiar, M. V. Rajamma, S. A. Natarajan, D. Balasubramaniam	25-02-1949
Vinothini	Ramji Bai Arya - S. R. Krishna Iyengar	Vainatheyin Photo Films	Srinivasa Iyengar	N. Krishnamoorthy, K. T. Dhanalakshmi, V. S. Mani, M. V. Raju, 'Stunt' Somu, T. V. Sethuraman, S. Sathyabama	24-03-1949
