= Mahamaya (film) =

1944 film directed by T. R. Raghunath and Elangovan

- Theatrical release poster
- Directed by: T. R. Raghunath; Elangovan
- Screenplay by: Elangovan
- Story by: Elangovan
- Produced by: M. Somasundaram; S. K. Mohideen
- Starring: P. U. Chinnappa; P. Kannamba
- Cinematography: Marcus Bartley
- Edited by: A. Kasilingam
- Music by: S. V. Venkatrama Iyer; K. S. Venkatarama Iyer
- Production company: Jupiter Pictures
- Distributed by: South India Pictures
- Release date: 16 October 1944
- Running time: 11,000 ft.
- Country: India
- Language: Tamil

Mahamaya (transl. The great illusion) is a 1944 Indian Tamil-language historical drama film directed by T. R. Raghunath, starring P. U. Chinnappa and P. Kannamba. It was released on 16 October 1944.

== Plot ==
Mahamaya, the princess of the kingdom of Gandhara, and Vikram, the prince of a neighbouring kingdom, happen to be pupils of the same teacher (Guru). Mahamaya garlands the sword of Vikram without knowing its implication. According to the custom of those times, when a woman garlands a man's sword, she is considered to have become the wife of the sword owner. Vikram knows about the custom. After they leave the Ashram of the teacher each marries a different person. Later, Vikram happens to meet Mahamaya. Reminding her that she has chosen him as her husband, he claims that she belongs to him. Mahamaya rejects his claim. Vikram abducts Mahamaya but she manage to escape from him. When she returns home, her husband refuses to accept her. Abandoned, Mahamaya kills her child and commits suicide.

== Cast ==
Male cast

- P. U. Chinnappa as Vikramsimhan
- N. S. Krishnan as Singan
- R. Balasubramanyam as Amarasimman
- D. Balasubramanyam as Nandagupthan
- M. G. Chakrapani as Neelan
- S. V. Sahasranamam as Jayapalan
- T. R. B. Rao as Mahipalan

Female cast

- P. Kannamba as Mahamaya
- T. A. Mathuram as Meera
- M. S. Saroja as Chandralekha
- M. K. Meenalochani as Manorama Devi
- T. D. Kusalambal as Bala

Female dancers

- K. Varalakshmi, T. Rajbala, V. Rajeswari, K. Rajarajeswari, K. S. Sarojini, M. S. Santha, J. Kanni.

== Production ==
The film was jointly produced by M. Somasundaram and S. K. Mohideen, and directed by T. R. Raghunath and Elangovan; the latter also wrote the screenplay. Cinematography was handled by Marcus Bartley and the film's operative cameraman was Jiten Banerji. Editing was done by A. Kasilingam and audiography by Dinshaw K. Tehrani. Art was handled by F. Nagoor and choreography by M. Meenakshisundaram Pillai and Pandit Bholonath Sharma. Elangovan took almost a year to complete the screenplay. He was not sure how to end the story, so he wrote three endings and left the decision to the producers and the director; all three endings were filmed. The film was shot at Newton Studios.

== Soundtrack ==
Music was composed by S. V. Venkatrama Iyer and K. S. Venkatarama Iyer while the lyrics were written by T. K. Sundara Vathiyar and Kambadasan. Though there were 10 songs in the film only one ‘Silaye nee ennidam sung by P. U. Chinnappa was a hit.

== Release and reception ==
Mahamaya was released on 16 October 1944, and distributed by South India Pictures. Although the film was acclaimed by critics for the acting by Kannamba and Chinnappa, audiences at that time did not accept the story because it shows a king going after another person's wife. Therefore, the film did not do well at the box office.
