= Prithivirajan =

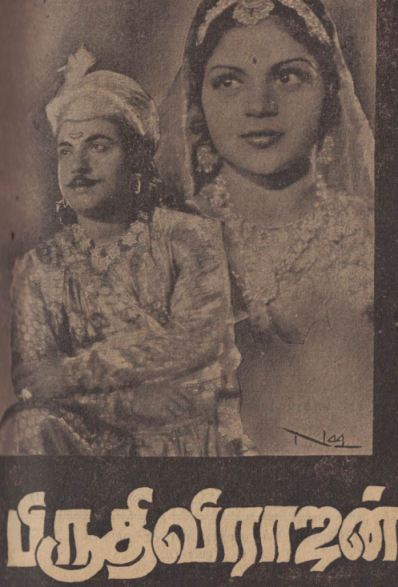
- Directed by: B. Sampathkumar
- Written by: B. Sampathkumar
- Based on: Prithviraj Chauhan folk legend
- Starring: P. U. Chinnappa; A. Sakunthala; T. S. Balaiah; M. R. Santhanalakshmi
- Music by: G. Ramanathan
- Production company: Central Studios
- Distributed by: Haran Talkies
- Release date: 29 April 1942 (India)
- Country: India
- Language: Tamil

Prithivirajan is a 1942 Indian Tamil language film directed by B. Sampathkumar. The film stars P. U. Chinnappa and A. Sakunthala.

== Plot ==
The story is based on the popular folk legend Prithviraj, the king of Kanauj, of the Chauhan dynasty. Prithivirajan falls in love with Samyuktha the princess and daughter of the King of Delhi, Jayachandran. Though Prithivirajan and Jayachandran joined hands and defeated Mohammed Ghori, something happened and they became enemies. Jayachandran places a statue of Prithivirajan in the hall where Samyuktha is to choose her life partner from among the princes who were gathered there. She puts the garland to the statue of Prithivirajan. But, lo and behold, the statue turns into real life Prithivirajan who takes the hand of Samyuktha and off they went to the utter astonishment of King Jayachandran and others.

== Cast ==
The list is adapted from The Hindu article.

- P. U. Chinnappa as Prithviraj Chauhan
- A. Sakunthala
- T. S. Balaiah
- T. M. Ramaswami Pillai
- M. R. Santhanalakshmi
- S. D. Subbaiah
- G. M. Basheer
- N. S. Krishnan
- T. A. Mathuram
- T. K. Sampangi
- T. R. B. Rao
- S. Velusami Kavi
- Kali N. Rathnam
- C. T. Rajakantham
- P. S. Gnanam
- K. K. Krishnaveni

== Production ==
Though this was a historical film, Subramania Bharati's song Bharata Samudhaayam Vaazhgave, of the 1930s Indian Freedom Movement period, was included in the film and sung by the hero P. U. Chinnappa. Bharati was not credited in the titles because there was British rule in India at that time and Bharati's songs were banned.

The same story was again filmed in 1962 in Tamil with M. G. Ramachandran and Padmini in the lead roles. The title was given as Raani Samyuktha.

== Soundtrack ==
Music was composed by G. Ramanathan while the lyrics were penned by A. Natarajan and Velusamy Kavi.

== Reception ==
The film did not fare well at the box office. However, the comic scenes by N. S. Krishnan & T. A. Mathuram and Kali N. Rathnam & C. T. Rajakantham provided good entertainment. The film is remembered for PUC's impressive performance and melodious music.
