= Jagathalapratapan =

- Theatrical release poster
- Directed by: S. M. Sriramulu Naidu
- Written by: Vadivelu Nayakar
- Starring: P. U. Chinnappa; M. S. Sarojini
- Cinematography: V. Krishnan
- Edited by: Surya
- Music by: G. Ramanathan
- Production company: Pakshiraja Films
- Distributed by: Narayanan & Company
- Release date: 13 April 1944
- Running time: 176 minutes
- Country: India
- Language: Tamil

Jagathalapratapan is a 1944 Indian Tamil-language film starring P. U. Chinnappa and M. S. Sarojini. A film adaptation of a folk tale "12 Minister's Tale", the film also features P. B. Rangachari, M. R. Santhanalakshmi and N. S. Krishnan playing supporting roles. The film revolves around the theme of a prince who through his talents wins over several girls and marries them. The film was released on 13 April 1944 and became a box-office success and established Chinnappa as one of the top stars in Tamil cinema.

== Plot ==
Jagathalapratapan is a prince who is to be punished from his kingdom for expressing his desire for four celestial maidens: Indrani, Nagakumari, Agnikumari and Varunakumari. However, he escapes punishment and roams in disguise in the company of a friend when he meets a damsel who is Indirakumari in disguise. He marries her and settles down in a kingdom whose king falls in love with his wife and sends the prince away to Nagaloka in order to covet her. Jagathalapratapan, however, succeeds in finding Nagakumari in Nagaloka, Agnikumari in Agniloka and Varunakumari in Varunaloka and succeeds in winning them as wives.

== Cast ==
Male cast

- P. U. Chinnappa as Jagathalapratapan
- N. S. Krishnan as Vichitran
- P. B. Rangachari as Ulakathi King
- M. V. Mani as Vishwaranjithapuri King
- T. S. Balaiah as Gururakarman, Minister
- D. Balasubramaniam as Devendran
- Kulathumani as Brahaspathi
- B. Paramasivan Nadar as Devaloka Wrestler
- M. S. Murugesan as Fisherman

Female cast

- M. S. Sarojini as Indrakumari, Sasirekha
- T. A. Mathuram as Mohana, Sasirekha's friend
- M. R. Santhanalakshmi as Queen Vilasavathi
- U. R. Jeevarathnam as Nagakumari, Rathnaprabha
- S. Varalakshmi as Akinikumari, Prakashini
- T. A. Jayalakshmi as Varunakumari, Vahini
- P. Saradambal as Avvai

Dance

- Baby Kamala as Nagalokam Dancer
- Yogambal, Mangalam as Devalokam Dancers

== Production ==
After the success of Aryamala (1941) and Sivakavi (1943), K. S. Narayana Iyengar and S. M. Sriramulu Naidu launched their next production under the Pakshiraja Films banner at Central Studios, titled Jagathalapratapan. The snake dance performed by Baby Kamala was popular. There was also a dance by the famous duo Yogambal-Mangalam. These dances were choreographed by V. B. Ramaiah Pillai. The final reel length of the film was 6,003 metres (19,695 ft).

== Soundtrack ==
The songs were composed by G. Ramanathan and lyrics were written by Papanasam Sivan. The song "Thaayai Paniveneh" was not recorded in gramophone due to the length of the song. In this song sequence, Chinnappa sings like it's being rendered in a concert, with the accompanists playing the violin, mridangam, ghatam and ‘konnakol', all played by Chinnappa himself who appears in a single frame.

== Release ==
Jagathalapratapan was released on 13 April 1944. The film became a commercial success and established Chinnappa as a top star of Tamil cinema, with some critics equating him with Thyagaraja Bhagavathar. Randor Guy wrote that film is remembered for the interesting storyline, song and dance numbers, and Chinnappa's impressive performance. In 1947, the film was re-released after being partially colourised.

== Bibliography ==
- Dhananjayan, G. (2014). Pride of Tamil Cinema: 1931–2013. Blue Ocean Publishers. OCLC 898765509.
