= Vedavathi Alladhu Seetha Jananam =

Vedavathi or Seetha Jananam
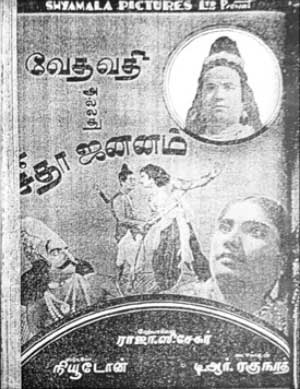
- Poster
- Directed by: T. R. Raghunath
- Based on: Ramayana Indian Epic
- Produced by: Raja Chandrasekar
- Starring: M. R. Krishnamoorthy; R. Balasubramaniam; M. G. Ramachandran; M. G. Chakrapani; K. Thavamani Devi; Kolar Rajam
- Cinematography: T. E. Cooper
- Music by: T. K. Jeyarama Iyer
- Production company: Shyamala Pictures
- Release date: 11 January 1941 (India)
- Country: India
- Language: Tamil

Vedavathi Alladhu Seetha Jananam (transl. Birth of Vedavathi or Sita) is a 1941 Indian Tamil-language Hindu mythological film directed by T. R. Raghunath. The film featured M. R. Krishnamoorthy and K. Thavamani Devi in the lead roles.

== Cast ==
The names in this list were adapted from the film poster.

Male cast

- M. R. Krishnamoorthi as Naradar
- R. Balasubramaniam as Ravanan
- P. G. Venkatesan as Vibhishanan
- M. G. Ramchandar as Indrajit
- V. S. Mani as Ramar - Vishnu
- V. Nataraj as Bhrahaspathi - Naradar
- M. G. Chakrapani as Janakar - Kuberan
- P. S. Veerappan as Indran
- S. Nandaram as Yaman
- K. S. Velayutham as Nandhi - Hanuman
- N. S. Velappan as Nalakooparan
- V. Srinivasa Sastri as Agni
- K. Ramaswamy Iyer as Kumbakarnan
- S. Ramudu as Varunan
- P. Govindasamy as Sivan
- T. V. Krishnaswamy as Sooriyan
- P. Lakshmanasami as Lakshmanan
- M. Sankararaman as Vaayu
- A. C. Sundaram as Messenger

Female cast

- Kolar Rajam as Mandodhari
- K. Thavamani Devi as Vedavathi - Seetha
- Kumari Rukmini as Rambai
- M. S. Saroja as Menaka
- T. N. Sundaramma as Lakshmi
- M. V. Kunjammal as Urvasi
- M. S. Sundarambal as Thilothama
- G. S. Saraswathi as Bhoodevi
- V. S. Kausalya as Parvathi
- Visalakshi as Soorpanagai

Aakasa Vani

- N. S. Krishnan
- T. A. Mathuram

== Crew ==
The names in this list was adapted from the film poster.

- Producer – Raja Chandrasekar
- Director – T. R. Raghunath
- Cinematography – T. E. Cooper
- Audiography – A. Krishnaiyer
- Art – F. Nagoor
- Studio – Newtone

== Production ==
Most of the early films in Tamil were reproduction of stage dramas. Some films even opened with a screen going up. The stage dramas usually had a main title and an alternative title. Thus this film also had two titles.

A comedy short film titled Aakaasa Vaani, featuring N. S. Krishnan and T. A. Mathuram, was included in the film.

== Soundtrack ==
Music was composed by T. K. Jeyarama Iyer while the songs' lyrics were penned by Papanasam Sivan and P. R. Rajagopala Iyer. Krishnamoorthy and Thavamani Devi sang most of the songs.

| No. | Song | Singer/s | Lyricist | Duration (m:ss) |
|---|---|---|---|---|
| 1 | "Maara Janaka... Sri Ramana" | M. R. Krishnamoorthy | | 03:16 |
| 2 | "Idhu Enna Urakkam" | M. R. Krishnamoorthy | | 03:23 |
| 3 | "Prema Sanga Sugam" | P. G. Venkadesan | | 03:39 |
| 4 | "Ulagile" | P. G. Venkadesan | | 03:41 |
