= Arthanaari =

- Theatrical release poster
- Directed by: T. R. Raghunath
- Written by: B. S. Ramiah
- Produced by: T. R. Raghunath
- Starring: P. U. Chinnappa; T. R. Ramachandran; M. S. Saroja; M. V. Rajamma
- Cinematography: Paes
- Music by: Madras United Artistes Corporation Music Party
- Production companies: Kalaivani Films; Madras United Artistes Corporation
- Release date: 7 February 1946
- Country: India
- Language: Tamil

Arthanaari is a 1946 Indian Tamil language film directed and produced by T. R. Raghunath, and written by B. S. Ramiah. The film stars P. U. Chinnappa, T. R. Ramachandran, M. S. Saroja and M. V. Rajamma with N. S. Krishnan, T. A. Madhuram and Kali N. Rathnam playing supporting roles. It was released on 7 February 1946.

== Plot ==
Bhagavathi and Punyavathi are the princesses of the kingdom of Gandhara who have lost everything due to misfortune and live on the banks of the Ganges. Vijayavarman, Bhagavathi's husband and himself a prince, is thrown into prison by the people who usurped the throne of Gandhara. While Vijayavarman thinks of a way to escape and reclaim the kingdom, the two princesses decide to commit suicide by drowning themselves in the Ganges. A sage, who happened to perform penance under a sacred tree nearby, sees the princesses drowning, saves them and advises them to seek the blessings of Ardhanarishvara and have faith in Him. Vijayavarman is rescued by one of his friends and defeats the usurpers, thus reclaiming Gandhara. He then reunites with the two princesses.

== Cast ==
The cast is listed below:

- P. U. Chinnappa as Vijayavarman
- T. R. Ramachandran
- M. S. Saroja as Bhagavathi
- M. V. Rajamma as Punyavathi
- N. S. Krishnan
- T. A. Madhuram
- Kali N. Rathnam
- C. T. Rajakantham

== Production ==
The script for Arthanaari was written by the playwright and journalist B. S. Ramiah. Principal photography for the film was done in Pragathi Studios, which was then situated in the Adyar Vizianagaram Palace.

== Soundtrack ==
The film's music and score composed by the Madras United Artistes Corporation Music Party while Papanasam Sivan and Rajagopal Iyer wrote the lyrics for the songs. Chinnappa sang a few songs for the film.

== Reception ==
Wiring for The Hindu, film critic and historian Randor Guy noted that the film was an average success at the box office, but remembered for "the impressive performance of Chinnappa, and the fine direction of T.R. Raghunath."
