= Naveena Vikramadityan =

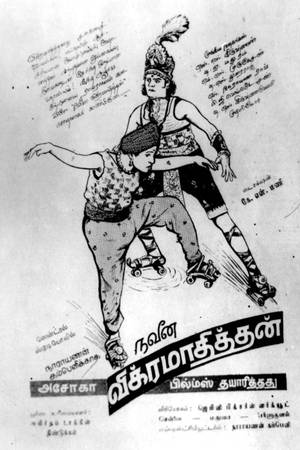
- Advertising Poster
- Directed by: K. S. Mani
- Screenplay by: Elangovan
- Story by: N. S. Krishnan
- Based on: Roman Scandals
- Produced by: N. S. Krishnan
- Starring: N. S. Krishnan; T. A. Mathuram; T. S. Durairaj; M. R. Swaminathan
- Music by: N. S. Balakrishnan
- Production company: Asoka Pictures
- Distributed by: Narayanan Company
- Release date: 29 June 1940 (India)
- Country: India
- Language: Tamil

Naveena Vikramadityan (transl. Modern Vikramadithyan) is a 1940 Indian Tamil language film produced by N. S. Krishnan and directed by K. S. Mani. The film stars N. S. Krishnan, T. A. Mathuram, T. S. Durairaj and M. R. Swaminathan. The story is based on the 1933 American film Roman Scandals.

== Plot ==
In the film, N. S. Krishnan used to give musical discourses on the story of King Vikramaditya, an emperor in ancient India. NSK takes the emperor as his role model. One day he had a dispute with his friend M. R. Swaminathan who knocks NSK unconscious. During the unconscious state, NSK becomes the Emperor Vikramaditya. In this dream-like state he undergoes many adventures along with T. S. Durairaj. As a king he travels faster using roller skates. He meets Pesa Madanthai (woman who doesn't speaks) T. A. Mathuram and falls in love with her and sets about to make her his own.

== Cast ==
List adapted from The Hindu article and from the database of Film News Anandan.

- N. S. Krishnan
- T. A. Mathuram
- S. V. Sahasranamam
- T. S. Durairaj
- M. R. Swaminathan
- P. S. Gnanam
- T. S. Krishnaveni
- P. R. Mangalam

== Production ==
The film was produced in Central Studios where N. S. Krishnan had the office of his company Asoka Pictures. S. M. Sriramulu Naidu who was a partner in Central Studios helped in the production. Financial assistance was done by Narayanan and Company.

Roller skates were not known in India at that time. N. S. Krishnan is said to have undergone rigorous practice for many hours in order to achieve perfection in the film.

=== Buddhimaan Balavaan Avaan ===
This a short film produced and directed by N. S. Krishnan. It featured N. S. Krishnan and T. A. Mathuram. This short film was shown along with the main film Naveena Vikramadityan.

== Reception ==
The film was well received by the audience and is remembered for NSK's skating and its comedy.
