= Krishna Bhakthi =

1949 film by R. S. Mani

- Theatrical release poster
- Directed by: R. S. Mani
- Story by: R. S. Mani
- Based on: The Monk by Matthew Lewis
- Produced by: S. N. Laxmana Chettiar
- Starring: P. U. Chinnappa; T. R. Rajakumari
- Cinematography: Jiten Banerjee
- Edited by: P. S. Winfred
- Music by: S. V. Venkatraman; Kunnakudi Venkatarama Iyer
- Production company: Krishna Pictures
- Release date: 14 January 1949
- Running time: 160 minutes
- Country: India
- Language: Tamil

Krishna Bhakthi (transl. Devotion to Krishna) is a 1949 Tamil-language historical musical film, directed by R. S. Mani, and produced by S. N. Laxmana Chettiar. The film stars P. U. Chinnappa and T. R. Rajakumari as a hypocrite saint and chaste court dancer respectively. Inspired by Matthew Lewis' French novel The Monk, it was released on 14 January 1949.

== Plot ==
Harikanandha Bhagavathar is a hypocrite saint who lusts after a chaste court dancer Devakumari.

== Cast ==
Male cast according to the opening credits of the film and female cast according to the song book

Male cast

- P. U. Chinnappa as Harikanandha Bhagavathar
- N. S. Krishnan as Vevukarar
- K. R. Ramasami as Shri Krishnan
- Chithambaram Jayaraman as Naradar
- Pullimoottai Ramasami as Neebhushanam, Rajaguru
- D. Balasubramaniam as Narasimhan
- Azhwar Kuppusami as Alwar
- Kulathu Mani
- V. K. Ramasamy (uncredited)
- C. S. Pandian
- T. V. Namasivayam
- K. R. Chellamuthu
- E. Krishnamoorthi
- S. V. S. Narayanan
- T. V. Sivanandam
- Chandrasekharan
- S. Ramanathan
- T. V. Radhakrishnan
- V. Srinivasa Rao
- C. P. Venkateswaran
- Thirupathi
- S. S. Mani
- A. K. Kaleeswaran

Female cast

- T. R. Rajakumari as Devakumari, Palace Dasi
- T. A. Mathuram as Vevukarar's Wife
- S. P. L. Dhanalaskhmi as Vasumathi, Rajaguru's Wife
- P. A. Periyanayaki as Bhama
- A. R. Sakunthala as Rukmani
- C. T. Rajakantham as Ragamanjari, Old Mother
- M. L. Vasanthakumari as Singer
- Kumari N. Rajam as Mridangam Player
- C. V. Dhanalakshmi as Yazh Player
- T. D. Kusalakumari as child dancer Sarasu
- P. Padma as Women Dancer
- K. S. Lakshmi as Geetham Singer
- M. K. Saroja as Thillana Dancer
- C. R. Rajakumari as Thillana Dancer
- K. S. Rajam as Women Dancer
- K. S. Chandra as Women Dancer
- Kumari Vanaja as Women Dancer
- R. Saraswathi as Women Dancer
- S. Rajeswari as Women Dancer
- S. Padma as Women Dancer
- Kumari Seetha as Beggar Girl

== Production ==
S. Ramanathan, an assistant of director R. S. Mani, bought a copy of the English translation of Matthew Lewis' French novel The Monk at Moore Market for one rupee. Subsequently, Mani began writing his next film Krishna Bhakthi taking inspiration from this novel. While Mani was credited for the story, the dialogues were written by S. D. S. Yogi, Shuddhananda Bharati, Ku. Pa. Sedhu Ammal and Sandilyan. Work on the script lasted more than six months, and the protagonist played by P. U. Chinnappa was based on the Russian mystic Grigori Rasputin. The film was produced by S. N. Laxmana Chettiar under Krishna Pictures. M. L. Vasanthakumari appeared onscreen as a singer, and Krishna Bhakthi was the only film she ever acted in.

== Soundtrack ==
Music was composed by S. V. Venkatraman and Kunnakudi Venkatarama Iyer and lyrics were written by Udumalai Narayana Kavi. The song "Saarasam Vaseegara" was composed by G. Ramanathan. Kunnakudi Venkatarama Iyer composed music for the song "Kannan Varuvarodi", to which dance was choreographed by Vazhuvoor B. Ramaiah Pillai. He also composed music for "Thamarai Senkann" and "Entha Vedu". The song "Entha Vedu Kontha O Raagavaa" is set in the raga Saraswathi Manohari.

| Song | Singer | Length |
|---|---|---|
| "Aattam Enna Solluven" | C. S. Jayaraman | 03:20 |
| "Sarvarthana Krishna" | P. U. Chinnappa | 07:42 |
| "Marumurai Nee Indha" | P. U. Chinnappa | 07:09 |
| "Saarasam Vaseegara" | P. U. Chinnappa | 02:30 |
| "Pennulagilae" | K. R. Ramasamy | |
| "Poojithamana Meignanam" | P. A. Periyanayaki | |
| "Entha Vedu" | M. L. Vasanthakumari | 04:18 |
| "Murali Gaana Mohana" | P. U. Chinnappa & Chorus | |
| "Naan Kanavil Kanden" | P. A. Periyanayaki | |
| "Edhu Vendum" | C. S. Jayaraman | |
| "Kannan Varuvarodi" | P. A. Periyanayaki | |
| "Ellorum Nallavarae" | P. U. Chinnappa | 03:22 |
| "Kalaimagal Devakumari" | P. U. Chinnappa | |
| "Poovaiyar Karpin Perumai" | P. U. Chinnappa | |
| "Raadha Samethu" | M. L. Vasanthakumari | 03:00 |
| "Enna Vazhvu" | T. R. Rajakumari | |
| "Thamarai Senkann" | | |

== Release and reception ==
Krishna Bhakthi was released on 14 January 1949. The Indian Express wrote, "P. U. Chinnappa as the wily Rajaguru does credit to his reputation as top male star of the day. T. R. Rajakumari as the charming and ingenuous Rajanartaki gives a convincing performance". The Hindu wrote, "Krishna Bhakthi should have a very popular run for several weeks for more reasons than one. The theme has been handled in a very dignified and telling manner." The Mail wrote, "The drab found in most Tamil mythological pictures is completely eliminated in Krishna Bakthi". The film was released partly in color.
