= Mangayarkarasi =

- Theatrical release poster
- Directed by: Jiten Banerjee
- Written by: Suratha
- Screenplay by: Kambadasan; Suratha
- Based on: A folk tale
- Produced by: F. Nagoor; S. N. Ahmed
- Starring: P. U. Chinnappa; P. Kannamba; Anjali Devi; N. S. Krishnan; T. A. Mathuram
- Cinematography: Jiten Banerjee
- Edited by: V. B. Nataraja Mudaliar
- Music by: G. Ramanathan; Kunnakudi Venkatarama Iyer; C. R. Subburaman
- Production company: Bhagya Pictures
- Release date: 3 September 1949
- Running time: 172 mins. (15495 ft.)
- Country: India
- Language: Tamil

Mangayarkarasi (transl. Queen of women) is a 1949 Indian Tamil-language film directed by Jiten Banerjee. The film was produced by F. Nagoor and S. N. Ahamed, and stars P. U. Chinnappa, P. Kannamba and Anjali Devi. It is a remake of the Telugu film Gollabhama (1947) and Anjali Devi reprised her role. The film was re-released two years later, in a brand new coloured copy.

== Plot ==
A heavenly seductress takes away the crown prince from his kingdom to her heavenly abode. The wife of the prince is helped by an angel to reach her husband's abode. They spend the night together. She returns to Earth and finds that she has become pregnant. She is accused of being intimate with the court poet by the King and others. She leaves the palace and goes to live with some tribal people and there she delivers a child. The King rescues the child and brings him up. The child grows into a young man. Due to a strange situation the young man wants to have a relationship with his mother without knowing who she is. However, the heavenly woman brings back her husband in time and explains everything so that all ends well.

== Cast ==
Cast according to the opening credits of the film

Male Cast

- P. U. Chinnappa as Madhurangathan, Kandarupan, Sudhaman
- N. S. Krishnan as Parthiban, Jeevamrudham
- T. S. Durairaj as Parthiban's Friend
- Kavi Kambadasan as Poet Vidyapathi
- Pudukottai Seenu as Panchavarnam
- P. A. Kumar as Prime Minister
- P. V. Angappa as Minister
- Durai Pandian as Parthiban's Friend
- Radhakrishnan as Young Jeevamrudham
- C. Valli Nayagam as Hunter
- Thirupathi as Pujari

Female Cast

- P. Kannamba as Mangayarkarasi
- Anjali Devi as Sasikala
- T. A. Mathuram as Mohana
- Saradambal as Dasi Vanji
- D. S. Krishnaveni as Vasanthavathi
- T. A. Kantham as Maya
- Seetha - Rajam as Heavenly Virgins
- Padma — Pattammal as Heavenly Virgins
- Lalitha — Vathsala as Heavenly Virgins
- Navaneetham as Heavenly Virgin

Dance

- Lalitha-Padmini

== Production ==
The film featured P. U. Chinnappa in triple roles — King, Prince and the grandson. It was the first time in Tamil cinema that an artiste featured in 3 roles. N. S. Krishnan featured in double roles as father and son. Radhakrishnan played the role of N. S. Krishnan's kid and literally caught a crow in one scene. Thereafter he came to be fondly called Kaka Radhakrishnan, Kaka is the Tamil word for crow.

The knife dance performed by Lalitha and Padmini was a thriller. The film was shot at Newtone Studios, Madras.

== Soundtrack ==
Music was composed by G. Ramanathan, Kunnakudi Venkatarama Iyer and C. R. Subbaraman while the lyrics were penned by Kambadasan, Lakshmana Das and Ku. Sa. Krishnamurthi (film credits). Most of the tunes were set in Carnatic music ragas and were rendered by P. U. Chinnappa became popular. The song Kaadhal Kanirasame, set in the raga Chittharanjani, was a hit. It was composed using the same metre, melody and tune of the well-known composition Naatha thanumanisum Sankaram... made famous by Madurai Mani Iyer.

No	Title	Singer(s)	Length
1	"Paarthaal Pasitheerym"	P. U. Chinnappa	2:58
2	"Kadhal Kanirasame"	P. U. Chinnappa	6:27
3	"Vanilavi "	P. U. Chinnappa	4:06

== Reception ==
The film fared well at the box office. Film historian Randor Guy wrote in 2008 that the film is "remembered for: Triple role played by Chinnappa, double role by NSK, pleasing music and Kannamba’s performance."
