= Dakshayagnam (disambiguation) =

Dakshayagnam or Daksha yajna is a Hindu legend about the destruction of Daksha's sacrifice.

Films based on the legend include:

- Dakshayagnam, a 1938 Tamil film starring V. A. Chellappa, N. S. Krishnan and T. A. Mathuram
- Dakshayagnam, a 1962 Telugu film starring N. T. Rama Rao, S. V. Ranga Rao and Devika
- Dakshayagnam, a 1941 Telugu film starring Vemuri Gaggaiah, D. Sadasiva Rao, C. Krishnaveni and Bezawada Rajaratnam
