= Kubera Kuchela =

- Theatrical release poster
- Directed by: R. S. Mani
- Written by: B. S. Ramaiah
- Starring: P. U. Chinnappa; T. R. Rajakumari; D. Balasubramaniam; N. S. Krishnan; T. A. Mathuram
- Cinematography: Marcus Bartley
- Music by: Kunnakudi Venkatarama Iyer; S. V. Venkatraman (background music)
- Production company: Jupiter Pictures
- Distributed by: S. I. P. Release
- Release date: 14 June 1943
- Country: India
- Language: Tamil

Kubera Kuchela is a 1943 Indian Tamil-language Hindu mythological film directed by R. S. Mani and written by B. S. Ramaiah. The soundtrack was by Kunnakudi Venkatarama Iyer and background music by S. V. Venkat Raman. The film stars P. U. Chinnappa T. R. Rajakumari, D. Balasubramaniam and P. S. Govindan.

== Cast ==
- P. U. Chinnappa as Kubera Kuchela and the demon Kuchela
- Papanasam Sivan as Kuchela
- P. S. Govindan as Krishna
- D. Balasubramaniam as Kubera, the Lord of Wealth
- T. R. Rajakumari as Mallika
- R. Balasubramaniam
- N. S. Krishnan
- T. A. Mathuram
- T. S. Durairaj
- S. R. Janaki
- Pulimootai Ramaswami
- L. Narayana Rao
- T. V. Annapoorani
- M. K. Meenalochani
- P. G. Kuppuswami
- E. Krishnan

== Soundtrack ==
The film's music was composed by Kunnakudi Venkatarama Iyer, while S. V. Venkatraman scored background music. The lyrics were written by Papanasam Sivan and Udumalai Narayana Kavi. The song "Nadaiyalangaram Kanden" is set in the raga Kharaharapriya, "Maalai Chooda Vandhen Mallika" is set in Khamas, "Ennai Vittu Engey Sentreer" is in "Harikambothi", and "Kanna Kanna Kanna" is in "Kapi".

| No | Songs | Singers | Length |
|---|---|---|---|
| 1 | "Maalai Chooda Vandhen Mallika" | P. U. Chinnappa | 03:11 |
| 2 | "Nadaiyalangaram Kanden" | P. U. Chinnappa | 03:07 |
| 3 | "Selvame" | P. U. Chinnappa | 02:57 |
| 4 | "Ennai Vittu Engey Sentreer" | T. R. Rajakumari | |
| 5 | "Kanna Kanna Kanna" | Papanasam Sivan | |

== Marketing ==
The film was publicised with an innovative poster: a horizontal strip which contained lines in English: "Who Is Rich? Kubera or Kuchela? Watch The Movie".
