= Uthama Puthiran (1940 film) =

- Theatrical poster
- Directed by: T. R. Sundaram
- Written by: D. V. Chari (dialogues)
- Screenplay by: T. V. Swami
- Story by: N. Mian
- Produced by: Modern Theatres (Salem)
- Starring: P. U. Chinnappa; M. V. Rajamma
- Cinematography: P. V. Krishna Iyer
- Edited by: P. P. Varghese
- Music by: G. Ramanathan
- Release date: 24 October 1940
- Running time: 212 minutes
- Language: Tamil

Utthama Puthiran is a 1940 Tamil language film directed by T. R. Sundaram. P. U. Chinnappa, M. V. Rajamma, and T. S. Balaiah played the lead roles. It was the first Tamil film in which the leading actor P. U. Chinnappa played a double role.

== Production ==
Uthama Puthiran was adapted from the 1939 Hollywood film The Man in the Iron Mask, which was based on the 1847–1850 novel The Vicomte of Bragelonne: Ten Years Later by the French adventure fiction maestro, Alexandre Dumas. The film was produced and directed by the Salem based movie mogul, T. R. Sundaram, it proved successful and established the singing star of the 1940s, P. U. Chinnappa. The film featured him in dual roles and thus made him a first Tamil actor to feature him double roles. The double action scenes of Chinnappa was shot by Bodo Gutschwager, a German technician. There was a sequence of the twins engaged in a duel while singing a duet, throwing challenges making it one of the rare scenes in Indian cinema.

M. V. Rajamma, Kannada theatre and film actress, played the heroine. Uthama Puthran was her second film with Chinnappa, the first being Yayathi (1938). T. S. Balaiah portrayed the negative role. The film had supporting cast featuring NSK, Mathuram, Kali N. Ratnam, and P. A. Periyanayaki.

== Cast ==
- P. U. Chinnappa as Vikrama Pandiyan / Sokkanatha Pandiyan
- M. V. Rajamma as Meenatchi
- T. S. Balaiah as 'Minister' Naganathan
- T. S. Krishnaveni as Shanthamani
- Kali N. Ratnam as Pattabi
- Pulimoottai Ramasamy as Subbramani Samy

=== Guest appearance ===
- N. S. Krishnan as Iyengar
- T. A. Mathuram as Iyengar's wife

== Soundtrack ==
The music was composed by G. Ramanathan and the lyrics were penned by S. Velsamy. Even though the British Indian government banned the Tamil rebel poet Bharati's work, Sundaram had the actor render the famous song "Senthamizh Naadenum Podhiniley" and got away with it.

| No | Title | Singer(s) | Length |
|---|---|---|---|
| 1 | Igamo Unadharul | P. U. Chinnappa | -- |
| 2 | Kalangamilla Madhiyaa | P. U. Chinnappa | -- |
| 3 | Senthamizh Naadenum | P. U. Chinnappa | -- |

== Themes and influences ==
Uthama Puthiran adapted from Hollywood film The Man in the Iron Mask which was based on novel of same name notably became the first Tamil film to feature an actor in two roles. The story of identical twins was used often in Tamil cinema, and Dumas himself used it to write his famous The Corsican Brothers which was also adapted into Tamil. The Gemini Studios version Apoorva Sagotharargal (1949) with M. K. Radha playing the twins was a box office hit. M. G. Ramachandran played the twins in a rehash of the film titled Neerum Neruppum. The film was remade again in 1958 with Sivaji Ganesan. Uthama Puthiran also was the inspiration behind Imsai Arasan 23 m Pulikesi, a 2006 historical comedy film starring comedian Vadivelu as the twins.

== Bibliography ==
- Dhananjayan, G. (2014). Pride of Tamil Cinema: 1931–2013. Blue Ocean Publishers. OCLC 898765509.
