= Kaveri (1955 film) =

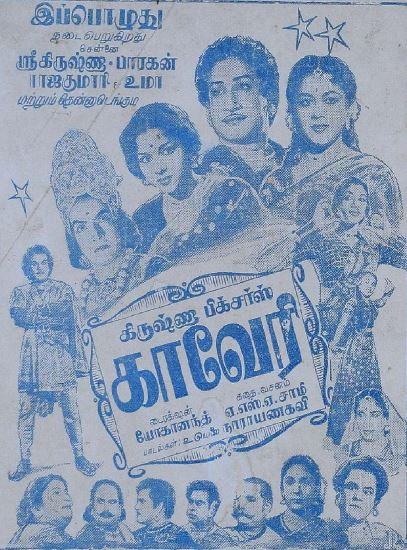
- Theatrical release poster
- Directed by: D. Yoganand
- Written by: A. S. A. Sami
- Produced by: Lena Chettiar
- Starring: Sivaji Ganesan; Padmini; Lalitha
- Cinematography: M. A. Rehman; P. Ramasamy
- Edited by: V. B. Natarajan
- Music by: G. Ramanathan; Viswanathan–Ramamoorthy
- Production company: Krishna Pictures
- Release date: 12 January 1955
- Running time: 16127 feet
- Country: India
- Language: Tamil

Kaveri is a 1955 Indian Tamil-language film directed by D. Yoganand, produced by Lena Chettiar and written by A. S. A. Sami. The film stars Sivaji Ganesan, Padmini and Lalitha. It was released on 12 January 1955. This film was shot simultaneously in Telugu as Vijaya Gauri with a slightly different cast.

== Cast ==
Male cast

- Sivaji Ganesan as Vijayan
- Kalaivanar N. S. Krishnan as Manimozhi
- M. N. Nambiar as Gnananandar
- P. S. Veerappa as Senganal
- D. Balasubramaniam as Nellaiyappar
- R. Balasubramaniam as Vattrivenkar
- E. R. Sahadevan
- T. E. Krishnamachari as Arulnirai King
- T. K. Sampangi as Minister
- Pullimootai Ramasamy Iyer as Servant
- Kottapuli Jayaraman as Bodyguard

Male Support Cast

- Rajagopal, Shanakaramoorthy, Veerasamy.

Female cast

- Padmini as Kaveri
- Lalitha as Amutha
- T. A. Madhuram as Thangam
- Ragini as Kurathi
- Kusalakumari as Performer
- Maadi Lakshmi as Performer
- Rushyendramani as Maharani
- M. Saroja as Sundari
- Angamuthu as Manimozhi's Mother

Female Support Cast

- Rita Dhanam, Thangam, Kumari, Vija, Prada, Saraswathi.

== Soundtrack ==
The music was composed by G. Ramanathan, Viswanathan–Ramamoorthy and C. S. Jayaraman. Lyrics by Udumalai Narayana Kavi. Sindhai Arindhu Vaadi, a song penned by Papanasam Sivan for Sri Valli (partly) and Kaalai Thookki Nindraadum, a kriti by Marimutha Pillai have been used in this film.

Song	Singers	Lyrics	Length	Music
"Manjal Veyil Maalaiyile Vanna Poongkavile"	C. S. Jayaraman & M. L. Vasanthakumari	Udumalai Narayana Kavi	05:22	G. Ramanathan
"En Sindhai Noyum Theeruma"	Jikki	Udumalai Narayana Kavi	03:08	G. Ramanathan
"Anbe En Aaruyire Angu Nirpadheno"	C. S. Jayaraman & Jikki	Udumalai Narayana Kavi	03:58	G. Ramanathan
"Ezhettu Naalaagathaan"	N. S. Krishnan, T. A. Mathuram, A. P. Komala, Jikki, A. G. Ratnamala and S. J. Kantha	Udumalai Narayana Kavi		G. Ramanathan
"Sandhosham Kollame Saapaadum Illaame"	Jikki	Udumalai Narayana Kavi	04:09	G. Ramanathan
"Sariyille Metha Sariyille"	N. S. Krishnan	Udumalai Narayana Kavi		G. Ramanathan
"Sivakaama Sundhari...Kanani Endhan Kaadhal Un Arulaal"	Jikki	Udumalai Narayana Kavi	03:21	G. Ramanathan
"Singaara Regaiyil Kaanudhu"	P. Leela	Udumalai Narayana Kavi	03:32	Viswanathan–Ramamoorthy
"Kudithana Muraimai Padithida Venum"	P. Leela & A. G. Rathnamala	Udumalai Narayana Kavi		Viswanathan–Ramamoorthy
"Manadhile Naan Konda"	M. L. Vasanthakumari	Udumalai Narayana Kavi		Viswanathan–Ramamoorthy
"Maangaai Paalundu Malai Mel"	C. S. Jayaraman	Udumalai Narayana Kavi	02:06	C. S. Jayaraman
"Sindhai Arindhu Vaadi Selva Kumaran"	C. S. Jayaraman	Papanasam Sivan		01:15
"Kaalai Thookki Nindraadum"	C. S. Jayaraman	Marimutha Pillai		

== Reception ==
Kaveri was a box office success, running for 100 days in many centres of the state.
