= Prahalada (film) =

- A poster of Prahalada
- Directed by: B. N. Rao
- Written by: T. C. Vadivelu Naicker
- Produced by: Salem Sankar
- Starring: T. R. Mahalingam; M. R. Santhanalakshmi; R. Balasubramaniam; Nagercoil K. Mahadevan; M. G. Ramachandran; N. S. Krishnan; T. A. Mathuram
- Music by: Sharma Brothers
- Distributed by: Salem Sankar Films
- Release date: 12 December 1939
- Country: India
- Language: Tamil

Prahalada is a 1939 Indian Tamil language film directed by B. N. Rao. It deals with the story of Prahlada and his devotion to Vishnu. It was one of the earliest adaptations of this mythologic story after the 1932 Telugu version. The story has subsequently been adapted 20 times in numerous languages including Hindi, Gujarati, Tamil, Telugu, Malayalam, Kannada, Bengali and Assamese with most of them being successful at the box office. It is also the one of those rare instances where a story has been adapted so many times, generally to box-office success. The film's story is based on the story of Narasimha and Prahlada. It features M. G. Ramachandran as Indra This was the sixth film of Ramachandran who later became one of the popular actors of the Tamil film industry. The film also featured a sword fight sequence between M.G. Ramachandran and Santhanalakshmi.

== Plot ==
The story is from a short episode in the Vishnu Purana, a holy text of Vaishnavites about Prahlada, an ardent devotee of Vishnu much against the wish of his father Hiranyakashipu, a demon. All of Hiranyakashipu's attempts to change his son's attitude are in vain. Finally, when he decides to kill his son, Vishnu comes to the rescue of the son, in the form of Narasimha (a man-lion form), and kills the king.

== Cast ==
Cast according to the opening credits

Male

- T. R. Mahalingam as Prahladan
- R. Balasubramanyam as Hiranyan
- Baby Sethuraman as Young Prahladan
- K. Mahadevan Iyer as Naradar
- M. G. Ramachandran as Indra
- N. S. Krishnan as Nikumban
- T. S. Durairaj as Kudumban
- V. R. Ponnusami as Brahman
- V. V. S. Mani as Vishnu
- K. P. Jayaraman as Sakatan
- G. M. Albert as Dunmugan
- S. Krishna Shastri as Shukarachari
- G. Mani as Amarakan

Female

- M. R. Santhanalakshmi as Leelavathi
- T. A. Mathuram as Vakula
- P. S. Gnanam as Gunavathi
- Seetha as Bhoodevi
- Saraswathi as Friend
- Mary as Friend
- Sivakami as Friend

== Production ==
The production was by Salem Shankar Films and Central Studios in Coimbatore. The story and the dialogues of the Tamil film were closely followed for the Malayalam version. The script and dialogues of the Malayalam version was by N. P. Chellappan Nair. The film was an average success at the box office.

== Adaptations ==
The story was first filmed in Telugu as Bhakta Prahlada in 1932 and later in many languages including Hindi, Gujarati, Telugu, Tamil, Malayalam, Kannada, Bengali and Assamese. It is also the only story which has been made so many times, often with box-office success.
