= Uthama Puthiran (1958 film) =

1958 film by T. Prakash Rao

- Theatrical release poster
- Directed by: T. Prakash Rao
- Screenplay by: C. V. Sridhar
- Based on: Uthama Puthiran (1940)
- Produced by: S. Krishnamoorthy; C. V. Sridhar; T. Govindarajan
- Starring: Sivaji Ganesan; Padmini
- Cinematography: A. Vincent
- Edited by: N. M. Shankar
- Music by: G. Ramanathan
- Production company: Venus Pictures
- Distributed by: Sivaji Films
- Release date: 7 February 1958
- Running time: 157 minutes
- Country: India
- Language: Tamil

Uthama Puthiran (transl. Virtuous Son) is a 1958 Indian Tamil-language historical action film directed by T. Prakash Rao. Co-produced by C. V. Sridhar, who also wrote the screenplay, the film stars Sivaji Ganesan and Padmini, with M. K. Radha, M. N. Nambiar, K. A. Thangavelu, Ragini and Kannamba in supporting roles. It revolves around twins who are separated at birth; one grows up to be a valiant warrior, and the other a tyrannical dictator.

Uthama Puthiran is a remake of the 1940 Tamil film of the same name, itself based on The Man in the Iron Mask, the third part of the 1847–1850 novel The Vicomte of Bragelonne: Ten Years Later by Alexandre Dumas. It is the first film to feature Ganesan in two distinct roles, and the first Indian film to have the shots with zoom technique. Cinematography was handled by A. Vincent, and editing by N. M. Shankar.

Uthama Puthiran was released on 7 February 1958, and distributed by Ganesan's company Sivaji Films. The film became a major commercial success, with a theatrical run of over 100 days, and established Ganesan as one of the most bankable stars in Tamil cinema.

== Plot ==
In the kingdom of Malarpuri, the queen delivers a male child. Her brother Naganathan replaces it with a dead child, and informs the king that the newborn is dead. To Naganathan's surprise, the queen gives birth to another boy soon after. The king is informed of the birth of two children, one dead and one alive. Everyone is happy that at least one child is delivered alive. Naganathan decides to kill the first infant and hands it over to his servant Somappa. However, Somappa and his wife raise the prince in a forest.

The crown prince is Vikraman, and his identical twin in the forest is Parthiban. On his deathbed, the king appoints Naganathan as the guardian of Vikraman, and orders that Naganathan would be solely responsible for Vikraman's safety. To achieve his objective of ruling the country, Naganathan brings up Vikraman with all vices and does not allow him to bond with his mother. In contrast, Parthiban grows up to become a valiant warrior under the guidance of Somappa and fights for the people.

After the king's death, Vikraman ascends the throne and hands over administrative controls to Naganathan, who indulges in all kinds of looting by levying more taxes. Parthiban comes out of the forest and saves the minister's daughter Amuthavalli, when her chariot goes out of control. They fall in love, and he starts visiting her palace late at night. Amutha encounters Vikraman, who looks similar to Parthiban, but does not disclose this to anyone. Vikraman likes her and tells Naganathan to fix his marriage with her. Amutha does not accept when Vikraman's mother comes with the proposal.

One night, the soldiers notice Parthiban getting into the palace, and they reach Amutha's room. She makes him escape by making him wear Vikraman's costume. While leaving, he meets his mother, but pretends to be Vikraman. When he is talking to her, Vikraman arrives, and they scuffle. Parthiban escapes, but when he comes again to meet Amutha, he is thrown into prison.

Through the maidservant, the queen learns that Parthiban is also her son. She goes to the prison and orders his release. By then, Vikraman arrives with Naganathan, who confirms they are brothers, but states that the kingdom cannot afford to have two brothers fighting for power. Vikraman does not wish to share the kingdom and to avoid anyone recognising him, orders that Parthiban be masked and imprisoned. Parthiban has an iron mask locked on his face; its key is with Vikraman.

Amutha and Parthiban's friend Ponnan hatch a plan to rescue Parthiban. Amutha makes Vikraman insensibly drunk after a dance and takes the key. Parthiban's associates reach the prison, set him free, put the same on Vikraman's face and dump him in prison. Parthiban assumes charge of the kingdom and introduces citizen-friendly policies which are welcomed by the people.

Naganathan suspects foul play. By then, Vikraman sends a message to Naganathan by writing on his dinner plate about Parthiban impersonating him. Naganathan releases Vikraman, brings him to the assembly and stops the coronation of Parthiban as the king. In the fight that ensues between Naganathan's army and Parthiban's people, Naganathan dies. Parthiban and Vikraman fight despite a plea from their mother. When Vikraman is overpowered, he escapes in a chariot and Parthiban tries to stop him, to no avail. Vikraman dies when his chariot falls off a cliff. Parthiban and Amutha become the new rulers of Malarpuri.

== Cast ==
Male cast

- Sivaji Ganesan as Parthiban and Vikraman
- M. K. Radha as the King
- M. N. Nambiar as Naganathan
- K. A. Thangavelu as Ponnan
- Venkatachalam Pillai as Minister Jayaseelar
- O. A. K. Thevar as Bhoopathy
- Stunt Somu as Somu

Female cast

- Padmini as Amuthavalli
- Ragini as Rajathi
- Kannamba as the Queen
- M. S. S. Bhagyam as Ponni
- Chellam as Chellamma
- Rita and Chandra as female dancers

Dance

- Helen

== Production ==
After the success of Amara Deepam (1956), director T. Prakash Rao and co-writer C. V. Sridhar wanted their next film to be on a grander scale. Rao decided on the folk tale of Valli, and he and Sridhar approached Sivaji Ganesan to star. Ganesan refused, saying another producer was adapting the story (as Sri Valli) and paid him an advance to star in it. Rao and Sridhar then considered adapting The Man in the Iron Mask, the third part of the 1847–1850 novel The Vicomte of Bragelonne: Ten Years Later by Alexandre Dumas. Though it had already been adapted in Tamil as Uthama Puthiran (1940), an unfazed Sridhar decided to remake the film as it had been more than 15 years since release. Ganesan accepted to star in the project.

The remake's screenplay was written by Sridhar, who co-produced the film with his partners S. Krishnamoorthy and T. Govindarajan under the banner Venus Pictures. It is the first film to feature Ganesan in dual roles. Sridhar initially wanted K. Ramnoth to direct this film, but he said he agreed to direct the same subject with M. G. Ramachandran in lead role, he was replaced by Prakash Rao. When Venus Pictures announced Uthama Puthiran in a newspaper, the same day Ramachandran announced a film with the same title in the same paper. Ramachandran eventually scrapped his film, but persisted with his plans to make a dual role film and finally made Nadodi Mannan, and released it several months after Uthama Puthiran. Cinematography was handled by A. Vincent, and the editing by N. M. Shankar.

The song "Kaathiruppan Kamalakannan", is picturised on Padmini and her sister Ragini's characters performing a Bharatham dance. "Yaaradi Nee Mohini", the first rock and roll dance song in Tamil cinema, is picturised on Hindi cinema dancer Helen. Ganesan, being trained in classical Indian dance, did not have any difficulty in learning or performing his dance moves. While shooting the song "Unnazhagai Kanniyargal" at Brindavan Gardens in Mysore, Vincent needed to capture Padmini and Ganesan – who were far from each other – in the same frame, but was unable to do so in high resolution. He then borrowed a French tourist's lens and fitted it into his own Paillard-Bolex 16 mm camera, giving a zoom effect and allowing Vincent to shoot as desired. The 16 mm footage was sent to London, where it was blown up to 35 mm. Thus, Uthama Puthiran became the first Indian film to have the shots with zoom technique. The final length of the film measured 116,044 feet (35,370 m).

== Soundtrack ==
The soundtrack was composed by G. Ramanathan. The song "Mullai Malar Mele" is set in the Carnatic raga known as Darbari Kanada, while "Kaathiruppan Kamalakannan" is a ragamalika, i.e. set to multiple ragas. These include Saramati, Jaunpuri and Natabhairavi. In "Yaaradi Nee Mohini", the lyric "Onnum Onnum Rendu" is based on "Sweet and Gentle" by Ben E. King.

Song	Singers	Lyrics	Length
"Muthe Pavalame"	R. Balasaraswathi Devi, A. P. Komala	A. Maruthakasi	05:28
"Yaaradi Nee Mohini"	T. M. Soundararajan, A. P. Komala, K. Jamuna Rani, Jikki	Ku. Ma. Balasubramaniam	07:06
"Moolai Neranjavanga"	T. M. Soundararajan, Sirkazhi Govindarajan	Pattukkottai Kalyanasundaram	
"Mullai Malar Mele"	T. M. Soundararajan, P. Susheela	A. Maruthakasi	03:22
"Mannulagellam Ponnulagaga"	Jikki, P. Susheela	Ku. Ma. Balasubramaniam	03:14
"Kaathiruppan Kamalakannan"	P. Leela	Sundhara Vathiyar	04:48
"Kondattam Manasukulle"	P. Leela	K. S. Gopalakrishnan	03:55
"Anbe Amudhey"	T. M. Soundararajan, P. Susheela	A. Maruthakasi	03:20
"Unnazhagai Kanniyargal"	P. Susheela	K. S. Gopalakrishnan	04:45
"Pulli Vaikkiraan"	Sirkazhi Govindarajan, P. Leela	Thanjai N. Ramaiah Dass	02:03

== Release and reception ==
Uthama Puthiran was released on 7 February 1958, and was distributed by Ganesan's own company Sivaji Films in Madras. In a review dated 16 February 1958, the magazine Ananda Vikatan praised the acting by Ganesan, the grand making, songs and the fight scenes. Kanthan of Kalki lauded the cinematography but criticised the action choreography, comparing it unfavourably to Apoorva Sagodharargal (1949). He also appreciated Sridhar's screenplay and dialogues, as well as many characters being able to act without relying on spoken words but visuals. The film became a major commercial success, running for over 100 days in theatres. Its Telugu-dubbed version, Veera Pratap, also performed well, having grossed over ₹4 lakh (equivalent to ₹3.8 crore or US$400,000 in 2023). It was also dubbed in Hindi as Sitamgar.

== Legacy ==
The success of Uthama Puthiran established Ganesan as a bankable star in Tamil cinema. Uthama Puthiran was the inspiration behind Imsai Arasan 23rd Pulikecei, a 2006 comedy film starring Vadivelu as the twins.

== Bibliography ==
- Dhananjayan, G. (2011). The Best of Tamil Cinema, 1931 to 2010: 1931–1976. Galatta Media. OCLC 733724281.
- Ganesan, Sivaji; Narayana Swamy, T. S. (2007) [2002]. Autobiography of an Actor: Sivaji Ganesan, October 1928 – July 2001. Sivaji Prabhu Charities Trust. OCLC 297212002.
- Joshi, Priya; Dudrah, Rajinder, eds. (2016). The 1970s and its Legacies in India's Cinemas. Routledge. ISBN 978-0-415-83658-6.
- Sundararaman (2007) [2005]. Raga Chintamani: A Guide to Carnatic Ragas Through Tamil Film Music (2nd ed.). Chennai: Pichhamal Chintamani. OCLC 295034757.
