= Kalyani (1952 film) =

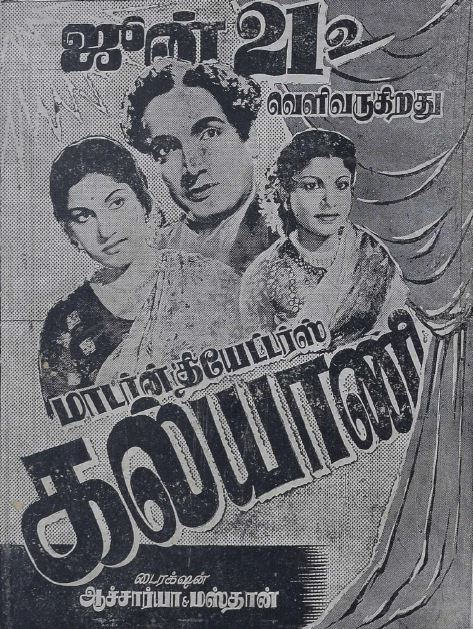
- Theatrical release poster
- Directed by: Acharya; M. Masthan
- Screenplay by: A. S. Nagarajan
- Story by: Modern Theaters Story Department
- Produced by: T. R. Sundaram
- Starring: M. N. Nambiar; B. S. Saroja
- Cinematography: M. Masthan
- Edited by: L. Balu
- Music by: S. Dakshinamurthi; G. Ramanathan
- Production company: Modern Theatres
- Release date: 21 June 1952
- Country: India
- Language: Tamil

Kalyani is a 1952 Indian Tamil-language psychological drama film directed by Acharya (T. G. Raghavachari) and M. Masthan, and produced by T. R. Sundaram of Modern Theatres. The film portrays the life of a mentally-deranged man and is heavily inspired by the 1948 American film The Snake Pit. It was remade in Telugu as Atthainti Kaapuram in 1952. Kalyani stars M. N. Nambiar. B. S. Saroja, D. Balasubramaniam, M. G. Chakrapani and T. P. Muthulakshmi had supporting roles.

== Plot ==
Moorthi struggles with mental problems and marries Kalyani, a young woman. The plot revolves around their relationship and the many problems faced by Kalyani, who eventually succeeds in curing her husband's mental illness.

== Cast ==
Male cast

- M. N. Nambiar as Moorthi
- D. Balasubramaniam as Subbaiah Pillai
- M. G. Chakrapani as Doctor
- K. V. Srinivasan as himself
- A. Karunanidhi as Accountant Pillai
- G. Muthukrishnan as Sekhar
- M. E. Madhavan as Broker Rengasami
- V. M. Ezhumalai as Kuppusami
- S. M. Thirupathisami as Inspector
- K. K. Soundar as Psychology Doctor

Female cast

- B. S. Saroja as Kalyani
- P. S. Sivabhagyam as Nagamma
- M. Saroja as Saroja
- M. S. Subhadra as Neela
- T. P. Muthulakshmi as Kamala
- P. S. Gnanam as Kamala's mother
- G. Sakunthala as Komalam
- K. T. Dhanalakshmi as Akilantam

Dance

- Kerala Sisters
- A. Chitra

== Production ==
Kalyani was originally directed by Acharya (T. G. Raghavachari). Midway through production, he contracted tuberculosis, so cinematographer M. Masthan (Mohammed Masthan) took over directing and completed it to the satisfaction of Acharya and the producer T. R. Sundaram. Choreography was handled by A. K. Chopra, K. R. Kumar, K. K. Sinha, and Dhandapani.

== Soundtrack ==
The music was composed by S. Dakshinamoorthi and G. Ramanathan with lyrics written by Kannadasan.

Song	Singer	Length
"Atho Paaradi Avare"	P. Leela	03:21
"Ini Pirivillamale Vaazhvom"	T. M. Soundararajan & K. Rani	03:04
"Success Success"	K. Jamuna Rani	02:05
"Takku Takku"	K. Rani	03:01
"Endha Kaariyamaayinum .. Ulagamidhuve Ulagamappaa"	S. C. Krishnan & K. Rani	05:40
"Kaadhal Aiyaiyo Kaadhal"	S. Dakshinamurthi	02:36
"Onnu Rendu Moonu"	K. Jamunarani & group	
"Thuyar Thaanaa Vaazhvil Ariyen"	K. Rani	
"Kaalamellaam Endhan Vaazhvil Thunbam Thaanaa"	P. Leela	
"Selvam Niraindhavar Endraale .. Thaai Paasamellaam"	T. M. Soundararajan	03:18
"Vaazhvatharke Idam Kodukkum"	T. M. Soundararajan	
En Vaazhvil Anbaai Neeyum	K. Rani	02:32

== Reception ==
The film did not fare well at the box office.
