= Kathavarayan (1958 film) =

1958 film by T. R. Ramanna

- Theatrical release poster
- Directed by: T. R. Ramanna
- Screenplay by: Thuraiyur K. Murthy
- Based on: Aryamala
- Produced by: T. R. Ramanna
- Starring: Sivaji Ganesan; Savitri
- Cinematography: T. K. Rajabathar
- Edited by: M. S. Mani
- Music by: G. Ramanathan
- Production company: R. R. Pictures
- Release date: 7 November 1958
- Running time: 184 minutes
- Country: India
- Language: Tamil

Kathavarayan is a 1958 Indian Tamil-language Hindu mythological film produced and directed by T. R. Ramanna, and written by Thuraiyur K. Murthy. A remake of the 1941 film Aryamala, it stars Sivaji Ganesan and Savitri. The film was released on 7 November 1958.

== Plot ==
Due to a quarrel between Lord Shiva and Shakti, Shakti and her son Veerabahu are cursed to be born on Earth and live as mortals. Veerabahu is Kathavarayan whom the tribals adopt and he becomes the prince of the mountains. Kathavarayan grows up and goes on a world tour, his mother Shakti blesses him with the divine power of transforming into any form he wishes when he is in danger. During his quests Kathavarayan falls in love with Princess Aryamala. Aryamala is reborn to a Rajaguru who predicts a tragic life for her, but the King adopts her and names her Aryamala. But the King is against their love. Kathavarayan is arrested by the King and taken to be impaled when Shakti prays to Shiva who saves him. Kaathavarayan and Aryamala live happily thereafter.

== Cast ==
- Sivaji Ganesan as Kathavarayan
- K. Savithri as Princess Aryamala
- P. Kannamba as Goddess Parvathi / Kamakshi
- E. V. Saroja as Swarnam
- M. N. Rajam as Aravalli
- T. S. Balaiah as Chinnan
- K. A. Thangavelu as General
- J. P. Chandrababu as Mannaru
- E. R. Sahadevan as King Aryan
- O. A. K. Thevar as Gypsy's head
- Kumari Kamala and Gopi Krishna as Shiva and Parvati dancers

== Production ==
Kathavarayan was adapted from Aryamala (1941). It was produced and directed by T. R. Ramanna under the R. R. Pictures banner, and written by Thuraiyur K. Murthy. Cinematography was handled by T. K. Rajabathar, and editing by M. S. Mani and T. Durai Rajan. The original lead actor was M. G. Ramachandran, who withdrew due to creative differences with Ramanna, resulting in Sivaji Ganesan replacing him. To differentiate Kathavarayan from Aryamala, Ramanna added a number of song and dance sequences.

== Soundtrack ==
The music was composed by G. Ramanathan. All songs are penned by Thanjai N. Ramaiah Dass. Some of the songs such as "Vaa Kalaba Mayile" and "Vidhiya Sadhiya" became huge hits.

Song	Singers	Length
"Ada Moona Asal Mukkaalanaa"	Jikki & T. M. Soundararajan	03:33
"Kanne En.... Amudha Ootrile"	A. P. Komala & Ghantasala	02:46
"Jaadhi Illai Madha Bedham Illaiye"	P. Leela & T. M. Soundararajan	02:50
"Jigu Jigu"	J. P. Chandrababu & Jikki	03:26
"Kumkara Kuppanna"	S. C. Krishnan, A. G. Rathnamala, K. Jamuna Rani, K. Rani & Sundaramma	06:08
"Niraiveruma Ennam Niraiveruma"	P. Suseela & T. M. Soundararajan	03:13
"Nithirai Illaiyadi Sagiye"	P. Leela	03:39
"Thandhane Thana Thandhane"	J. P. Chandrababu	03:04
"Vaa Kalaba Mayile"	T. M. Soundararajan	03:34
"Dheviyaval Kirubai Vendum"	T. M. Soundararajan	01:10
"Vetriye Arulamma"	A. P. Komala, K. Jamuna Rani, K. Rani & Sundaramma	02:20
"Thane Thandhaanane"	Jikki	02:23
"Sangili Jingili...Vaarandi Vaaraandi Kutticchaatthaan"	S. C. Krishnan, J. P. Chandrababu, A. G. Rathnamala & T. M. Soundararajan	06:55
"Vidhiya Sadhiya"	C. S. Jayaraman	03:00

== Release and reception ==
Kathavarayan was released on 7 November 1958. Kumudam, in its review, gave the film a single line remark: "Kattharavaayan" (a pun on the film's title and the Tamil word for shouting, /kəθθə/), reflecting on how it looked like a photographed play with most of the focus on aggressive dialogue delivery, similar to Parasakthi (1952).
