= Vanasundari =

- Theatrical release poster
- Directed by: T. R. Raghunath
- Screenplay by: T. R. Raghunath
- Story by: Elangovan
- Produced by: SM. Letchumanan Chettiar
- Starring: P. U. Chinnappa; T. R. Rajakumari; T. S. Balaiah; S. Varalakshmi
- Cinematography: Jithan Bannerji; Kumaradevan
- Edited by: S. A. Murugesan
- Music by: S. V. Venkataraman; C. R. Subburaman
- Production company: Krishna Pictures
- Release date: 9 February 1951
- Country: India
- Language: Tamil

Vanasundari is a 1951 Indian Tamil-language film directed by T. R. Raghunath, starring P. U. Chinnappa, T. R. Rajakumari, T. S. Balaiah and S. Varalakshmi. It was released on 9 February 1951.

== Plot ==
Prince Gunasagaran hates his father Marthandan, king of Neelapuri as he, in spite of his age, spends his time in entertainment without concern for people. Marthandan chases Gunasagaran out of the country. Gunasagaran and his friend Adhi Medhavi go to another country. There, a cruel younger brother of the king, Kapaleekaran rules after killing his elder brother. His paramour Leela is virtually ruling the State. Vanasundari, the king's daughter is in custody. Adhi Medhavi is imprisoned on false charge of theft. Gunasagaran meets Vanasundari in the jungle. Both exchange their tale of woes. Gunasagaran promises to rescue her. After many twists and turns the story has a happy ending.

== Cast ==
Male cast

- P. U. Chinnappa as Prince Gunasagaran
- T. S. Balaiah as Kapaleekaran
- R. Balasubramaniam
- D. Balasubramaniam
- M. G. Chakrapani
- N. S. Krishnan as Adhi Medhavi
- Kaka Radhakrishnan
- C. V. V. Panthulu
- M. S. Karuppaiah
- Pulimoottai Ramaswami
- Kulathu Mani

Female cast

- T. R. Rajakumari as Vanasundari
- S. Varalakshmi
- T. A. Mathuram
- C. T. Rajakantham
- T. V. Kumudhini
- T. A. Jayalakshmi

Dance

- Lalitha-Padmini
- C. R. Rajakumari

== Production ==
The film was produced by SM. Letchumanan Chettiar, a notable personality in the Tamil film industry in the 1950s. He was the first person to print and distribute handbills in Tamil and the first person to use cars such as Buick, Chevrolet, Studebaker and Dodge in Chennai. Due to some legal problems, his name was never credited in any of his films and only the name of his production banner "Krishna Pictures" appeared in the credits.

== Soundtrack ==
The music was composed by S. V. Venkatraman and C. R. Subburaman. D. K. Pattammal sang Naadu Chezhithida song off-screen.

| Song | Singers | Lyrics | Length (m:ss) |
|---|---|---|---|
| "Ennum Ezhutthum Iru Kananaagum" | P. U. Chinnappa | Kambadasan | 03:15 |
| "Kannile Vilaiyaadum Inba Kaadhal" | P. U. Chinnappa & T. R. Rajakumari | Kambadasan | 05:05 |
| "Annam Pola Aadi" | P. A. Periyanayaki & K. V. Janaki | Kambadasan | 06:09 |
| "Vinnil Inbam...Vandu Pola Aadi Sellum Odame" | P. A. Periyanayaki & P. Leela | Kambadasan | 01:09 |
| "Mannan Pennaaga Naanum Mann Meedhu" | T. R. Rajakumari | Kambadasan | 03:43 |
| "Inbamaaga Paaduvom" | P. A. Periyanayaki & K. V. Janaki | Kambadasan | 00:22 |
| "Aadai Alangaram Venum" | S. Varalakshmi | Kambadasan | |
| "Naane Mahaaraani" | S. Varalakshmi | Udumalai Narayana Kavi | 02:52 |
| "Deeyo Deeyo Deeyaalo" Dance by Lalitha and Padmini | P. A. Periyanayaki, K. V. Janaki & P. Leela | Udumalai Narayana Kavi | 08:32 |
| "Namasthe Namasthe" | P. U. Chinnappa & T. R. Rajakumari | Udumalai Narayana Kavi | 02:44 |
| "Aadu Padhinanchu Puli Moonu" | T. A. Madhuram | Udumalai Narayana Kavi | 04:37 |
| "Sonthamaaga Nenaichu" | N. S. Krishnan & T. A. Mathuram | Udumalai Narayana Kavi | |
| "Poovo Poovu Manam Veesum" | P. A. Periyanayagi | Udumalai Narayana Kavi | |
| "Naadu Chezhithidavum" | D. K. Pattammal | Udumalai Narayana Kavi | |
