= En Magal =

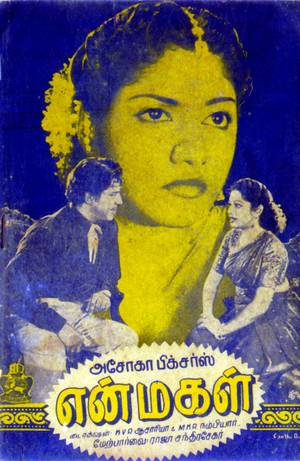
- Directed by: K. V. R. Acharya; M. K. R. Nambiar
- Screenplay by: 'Virudhai' N. Ramasamy (dialogues)
- Story by: K. V. R. Acharya
- Produced by: Ashoka Pictures
- Starring: Ranjan; S. Varalakshmi; M. N. Nambiar; Mynavathi; M. G. Chakrapani
- Music by: C. N. Pandurangan
- Production company: Ashoka Pictures
- Release date: 25 October 1954
- Running time: 184 minutes
- Country: India
- Language: Tamil

En Magal (transl. My Daughter) is a 1954 Indian Tamil-language drama film directed by K. V. R. Acharya and M. K. R. Nambiar. The film stars Ranjan, M. N. Nambiar and S. Varalakshmi. It was released on 25 October 1954.

== Plot ==
Raghu is a son of a zamindar. He likes to be independent from his father but he had to marry Vasantha, a mirasudar's daughter as per his father's wish. But he makes life hell for Vasantha. He sets his eyes on Vasantha's friend Mallika. But Mallika is already in love with Balu and they get married. However, Raghu is not deterred by their marriage and continue to overture Mallika. In the meantime Raghu also tries to seduce a dancer, Ranjana. She does not fall for him but tries to correct his ways. One day Raghu kidnaps Mallika. Her husband Balu and his friend goes to save her. In the ensuing fight a knife thrown by Mallika injures Raghu seriously. He is admitted to a hospital. On hearing that her husband is admitted to hospital, Vasantha goes there. She meets her friend Mallika and learns what has happened. How everything is solved forms the rest of the story.

== Cast ==
List adapted from The Hindu review article.

Male cast

- Ranjan as Raghu
- M. N. Nambiar as Balu
- M. G. Chakrapani as Mirasudar
- D. Balasubramaniam as Xamindar
- Appa K. Duraiswamy
- A. Karunanidhi
- Stunt Somu as Balu's friend

Female cast

- S. Varalakshmi as Vasantha
- Mynavathi as Mallika
- Bombay Meenakshi as Ranjana
- K. S. Rajam
- M. D. Krishna Bai
- Kanakam

== Production ==
The film was directed by K. V. R. Acharya and M. K. R. Nambiar under the supervision of senior director and filmmaker Raja Chandrasekhar.

== Soundtrack ==
Music was composed by C. N. Pandurangan.

Song	Singer/s	Lyricist
"Engal Vaazhvum Engal"	S. Varalakshmi	Bharathidasan
"Pennaaga Pirandhorku"	S. Varalakshmi	Pavalar Velayuthasami
"Vaazhvinile Aanandam"	S. Varalakshmi	Pavalar Velayuthasami
"Aadhavanai Polave Dhinamum"	A. M. Rajah & A. P. Komala	Pavalar Velayuthasami
"Ulaginil Vaazhvu Tharum Kalvi"	S. Varalakshmi, Sathyawathi & group	Pavalar Velayuthasami
"Kannai Kaanaamal Kalangudhe"	(Radha) Jayalakshmi	Pavalar Velayuthasami
"Azhukkai Pokkanum"	K. S. Rajam	Pavalar Velayuthasami
"Maayaa Jaala Ulagam, Idhil"	A. M. Rajah	Pavalar Velayuthasami
"Konden Arum Perum"	T. M. Soundararajan & S. Varalakshmi	Pavalar Velayuthasami
