= Dakshayagnam (1938 film) =

- Directed by: Raja Chandrasekhar
- Written by: Raja Chandrasekhar
- Produced by: Metropolitan Pictures
- Starring: V. A. Chellappa; N. S. Krishnan; T. A. Mathuram; M. G. Ramachandran
- Release date: 31 March 1938
- Running time: 17,000 feet
- Country: India
- Language: Tamil

Dakshayagnam (transl. The fire sacrifice of Daksha) is a 1938 Indian Tamil-language film directed by Raja Chandrasekhar. It starred V. A. Chellappa, N. S. Krishnan, T. A. Mathuram in the main roles. M. G. Ramachandran played a minor role in the film as Vishnu. The film was the first sound version based on Daksha yajna (lit. Daksha's fire sacrifice), the story of Daksha.

== Plot ==
Sati, the daughter of Daksha, a descendant of Brahma, marries Shiva against the wish of her father. This annoys the king (Daksha) and he performs a yagna to insult Shiva, where he invites all gods except his son-in-law (Shiva). Sati attends this sacrifice against the wishes of Shiva and is insulted by her father. Unable to bear this, Sati kills herself by burning in the fire.

Shiva destroys Daksha's sacrifice through Virabhadra, cuts off Daksha's head and replaces it with that of a goat, and restores his life. Later he picks up the remain of Sati's body and performs "Rudra Thandavam", a dance that will lead to the destruction of Universe, but the other gods intervene, and the Disc of Vishnu cuts through the Sati's corpse. Her body parts, known as Shakthi Peetas, fall in several places on the Indian subcontinent.

== Cast ==
- V. A. Chellappa as Shiva
- M. M. Radhabai
- M. G. Nataraja Pillai as Dhaksha
- K. R. Jayalakshmi
- P. G. Venkatesan
- T. N. Chandramma
- N. S. Krishnan
- T. A. Mathuram
- M. G. Ramachandran as Vishnu

== Production ==
The story was made multiple times into films during the silent film period and later during the sound film period. The first film Sati Parvathi, made in 1920 as a silent film. The second film was released in 1922 as Sati, which was produced by Madan Theatres. The third film was made by G. V. Sahni. Then came the first talkie version, titled Dakshayagnam. The movie was directed by Raja Chandrasekhar. In 1941, Telugu film-maker Chithrapu Narayanamurthi made the Telugu version and in 1962 another Telugu version was made by Kadaru Nagabhushnam, husband of actress P. Kannamba. In 1980, the movie was remade in Bengali. M. G. Ramachandran, who later became a leading actor and politician in Tamil Nadu, acted in a small role as Vishnu. M. G. Nataraja Pillai played an important role in the film.

== Release and reception ==
Dakshayagnam was released on 31 March 1938, and failed commercially.
