= Alibabavum 40 Thirudargalum (1941 film) =

1941 film by K. S. Mani

- Partial poster
- Directed by: K. S. Mani
- Screenplay by: Ilangovan
- Starring: N. S. Krishnan; T. A. Mathuram
- Cinematography: E. R. Goobbar
- Edited by: S. Surya
- Music by: N. S. Balakrishnan
- Production company: Pakshiraja Films
- Distributed by: Gemini Studios
- Release date: 15 March 1941
- Country: India
- Language: Tamil

Alibabavum 40 Thirudargalum (read as "Alibabavum Narpadhu Thirudargalum"; transl. Ali Baba and the Forty Thieves) is a 1941 Indian Tamil-language comedy film directed by K. S. Mani. The first Tamil film adaptation of the Arabian folk tale Ali Baba and the Forty Thieves, it stars N. S. Krishnan and T. A. Mathuram. The film was released on 15 March 1941, and was commercially unsuccessful. No print is known to survive, making it a lost film.

== Plot ==
In Baghdad, Cassim lives a wealthy but miserly lifestyle. At the instigation of his wife, he expels his mother and younger brother Ali Baba from the house. Ali Baba and his mother reside in penury in a small house. Cassim owns a crafty slave named Morgiana, who he lusts for, but she displays open contempt for him. Instead, she falls in love with Ali Baba.

One day, when Ali Baba and Morgiana are spending their time pleasantly together, Cassim suddenly appears, violently drives his brother away and advises Morgiana about her conduct. Ali Baba returns home and informs his mother all that happened. She sends him with his friend Kadar to his uncle's house.

Ali Baba and Kadar lose their way in the forest. Exhausted, they sit by a rock to rest and witness the door of a cave open itself and a group of men emerge from within. Terrified, they seek a place of hiding and watch the men. The men, who are actually thieves, chant a slogan and the door closes by itself. All of them then depart from the place. Coming out of hiding, Ali Baba and Kadar repeat the same slogan, enter the cave and find various treasures. They take some of the treasures and leave the cave.

The leader of the thieves and another, Kamal, go to Cassim's house disguised as diamond merchants. Smitten by Morgiana, the leader makes advances to her. Kamal warns him against exposing himself as he is already labouring under a suspicion that Morgiana suspects that they are up to no good. Kathija, another slave attached to the household, discovers their identity and hastens to bring some guards to capture them. The thieves suspect Morgiana for the betrayal and they escape via the balcony with her.

Cassim, with the assistance of Ali Baba, locates the cave and enters it. He greedily collects many treasures, and is left trapped as he cannot recall the slogan. The thieves arrive and kill him. Morgiana is also subjected to torture. Ali Baba finds Cassim's corpse and takes it back for burial. The thieves return to the cave and see the corpse is missing, but deduce that Ali Baba had taken it. The leader goes to Ali Baba's house disguised as an oil merchant. Morgiana, however, discovers his identity and outwits him.

== Cast ==
Cast according to the song book:

- N. S. Krishnan as Ali Baba
- T. A. Mathuram as Morgiana
- K. Hiranaiah as Cassim
- P. G. Venkatesan as Miyan
- T. R. Ramaswami as Pulimoottai
- K. P. Kamakshi as Abdul
- S. V. Sahasranamam as Kamal
- P. A. Subbiah Pillai as Mustafa
- V. K. Achari as Wrestler
- N. R. Padmavathi as Gulabi
- M. K. Babji as Kathija
- M. Jayalakshmi as Ali Baba's mother

== Production ==
Alibabavum 40 Thirudargalum was the first Tamil adaptation of the story Ali Baba and the Forty Thieves. It was directed by K. S. Mani for the company Pakshiraja Films that was owned and operated by S. M. Sriramulu Naidu. N. S. Krishnan was cast as Ali Baba, and his wife T. A. Mathuram as the slave girl Morgiana. Thoothukudi Ramaswamy Aiyer portrayed a character named "Pulimoottai", which subsequently became his prefix. Shooting took place at Central Studios.

== Soundtrack ==
The lyrics were written by K. P. Kamatchi, while the soundtrack was composed by N. S. Balakrishnan. One song performed by Krishnan himself, "Adichippoottaney Noguthadaa", attained popularity.

== Release and reception ==
Alibabavum 40 Thirudargalum was released on 15 March 1941. Film historian Randor Guy praised it for the "familiar storyline and the comical treatment that NSK gave his brainchild", but noted that the film was not successful. No print is known to survive, making it a lost film.
