= Amarakavi =

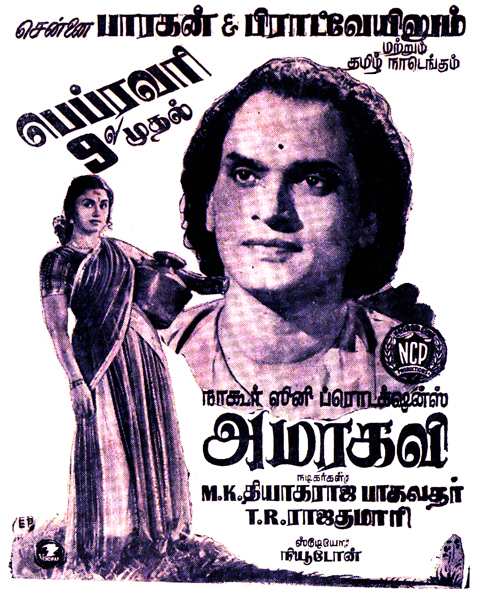
- Theatrical release poster
- Directed by: F. Nagoor
- Written by: Suratha
- Produced by: F. Nagoor
- Starring: M. K. Thyagaraja Bhagavathar; T. R. Rajakumari; B. S. Saroja; N. S. Krishnan; T. A. Mathuram
- Cinematography: Jithen Banerji (Supervisor); P. S. Selvaraj
- Edited by: V. B. Natarajan
- Music by: G. Ramanathan; T. A. Kalyanam
- Production company: Nagoor Cine Productions
- Release date: 9 February 1952
- Running time: 150 minutes
- Country: India
- Language: Tamil

Amarakavi (transl. Immortal Poet) is a 1952 Indian Tamil language film produced and directed by F. Nagoor. The film stars M. K. Thyagaraja Bhagavathar and T. R. Rajakumari. It was released on 9 February 1952.

== Cast ==
Adapted from the film credits.

Male cast

- M. K. Thyagaraja Bhagavathar as Amaran / Amarakavi
- N. S. Krishnan as Amaran's friend
- M. G. Chakrapani as Rajaguru
- K. Thangavelu as Amaran's friend
- Gundu Karuppaiah as Chettiyar
- Kottapuli Jayaraman as
- K. P. Kesavan
- M. S. Karupaiah
- Sethuraman
- Raja M. Dhandapani
- Thirupathi
- Loose Arumugam
- Goshi-Dawood
- Thiyagarajan
- Muthu Ramalingam

Female cast

- T. R. Rajakumari as Padmini
- B. S. Saroja as Princess Mallika
- P. K. Saraswathi as Dasi dancer
- T. A. Mathuram as Princess's servant
- K. S. Angamuthu as Kaliamma / Padmini's mother
- Lalitha-Padmini as Special Appearances in a song
- Subbuthayi
- Kumari Susheela

== Soundtrack ==
Music was composed by G. Ramanathan and T. A. Kalyanam.
The song "Uyirkalellam Inbamaayi" was composed in the Carnatic raga Jhankaradhvani.

Song	Singer/s	Lyricist	MD	Duration
"Annai Thandhai Anbariyaadha"	M. K. Thyagaraja Bhagavathar; P. Leela	Papanasam Sivan	G. Ramanathan	02:22
"Onru Serndhu Paadupattal...Sevai Seythaale"	M. K. Thyagaraja Bhagavathar, G. Ramanathan & Group	Papanasam Sivan	G. Ramanathan	03:48
"Uyirkalellam Inbamaayi"	M. K. Thyagaraja Bhagavathar	Papanasam Sivan	G. Ramanathan	02:34
"Thaazh Panindhu Avar Ullam"	M. K. Thyagaraja Bhagavathar	Papanasam Sivan	G. Ramanathan	02:21
"Pudhiya Vaazhvu Peruvom"	M. K. Thyagaraja Bhagavathar	A. Maruthakasi	G. Ramanathan	02:16
"Vaan Mazhai Pole"	M. K. Thyagaraja Bhagavathar	Suratha	G. Ramanathan	04:16
"Vinn Pola Neela Niram"	M. K. Thyagaraja Bhagavathar	Suratha	G. Ramanathan	01:37
"Vetrilai Podaamal"	M. K. Thyagaraja Bhagavathar	Suratha	G. Ramanathan	01:31
"Ellaam Inbame"	M. K. Thyagaraja Bhagavathar & N. L. Ganasaraswathi	Suratha	G. Ramanathan	02:46
"Paadharasam Pole"	G. Ramanathan	Suratha	G. Ramanathan	00:45
"Ellaam Thunbamayam"	N. S. Krishnan	Suratha	G. Ramanathan	00:55
"Pasiyaale Nondhene"	T. R. Rajakumari	Suratha	G. Ramanathan	01:32
"Chedi Maraivile Oru Poongodi"	M. K. Thyagaraja Bhagavathar & P. Leela	Suratha	G. Ramanathan	02:21
"Yaanai Thandham Pole"	M. K. Thyagaraja Bhagavathar & P. Leela	Suratha	G. Ramanathan	02:34
"Konji Pesum Kiliye"	M. K. Thyagaraja Bhagavathar & P. Leela	Suratha	G. Ramanathan	03:07
"Mullaich Chirippile"	P. Leela & N. L. Ganasaraswathi	Lakshmanadas	G. Ramanathan	01:11
"Mookuthi Minnudhu"	P. Leela & N. L. Ganasaraswathi	Lakshmanadas	G. Ramanathan	03:10
"Thoondi Mullu Pole...Paarunga Thinnu"	T. R. Rajakumari	Suratha	T. A. Kalyanam	03:48
"Oru Pizhaiyum Seydhariyen...Eesa Man Meethile"	M. K. Thyagaraja Bhagavathar	Ka. Mu. Sheriff	T. A. Kalyanam	03:31
