= P. U. Chinnappa =

Indian actor and playback singer (1916-1951)

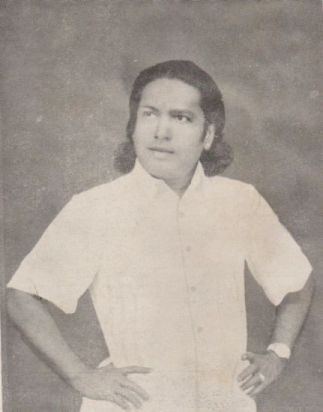
- P. U. Chinnappa
- Born: Pudukottai Ulaganathan Chinnaswamy Pillai; 5 May 1916; Pudukkottai state, India
- Died: 23 September 1951 (aged 35); Madras, Madras State, India
- Other name: Nadigar Mannar
- Occupations: Actor; Playback singer
- Years active: 1936-1951
- Spouse: A. Sakunthala
- Children: P. U. C. Raja Bahadur
- Parent(s): Ulaga Nathan Pillai, Meenakshi Ammal

Pudukottai Ulaganathan Chinnaswamy Pillai (5 May 1916 – 23 September 1951), popularly known as P. U. Chinnappa, was an Indian actor and playback singer during the 30s era from Pudukottai, India. He is also credited as one of the first major influential actors of Tamil cinema. His notable movies include Uthama Puthiran, Aryamala, Kannagi, Manonmani, Kubera Kuchela and Jagathalapratapan.

He attained the superstar status in his career, but it didn't last long because of his sudden demise.

== Early life ==
P. U. Chinnaswamy Pillai "Chinnappa" was born to P. Ulaganathan Pillai and Meenakshi Ammal on 5 May 1916. He had two sisters. His father was a stage artist and hence he made his way easily into stage acting. Chinnappa had completed his education only till 4th grade, he was not much involved in academics, he was rather interested in acting. As a kid too he acted in several stage shows. Chinnappa's acting as a thief in Sadaram stage play as a kid won applause from audiences. Not just acting, Chinnappa was interested in wrestling and Silambam too. Since his family was poor, at the age of 5 he went to rope production work for 5 rupees per month. However, he didn't work there for a long time.

Upon seeing his son's interest in acting, his father decided to pursue a career in acting for him. At the age of 8, Chinnappa joined Meenalokshani Vidvabala Sabha (under Sankaradnas Swamy, this sabha was run by Palaniyapillai). At that time T.K.S brothers were acting under this company and were very famous at that time. Chinnappa didn't last long there too, as he was not given significant roles. At that time Madurai Original Boys company were conducting stage play in Pudukkotai, Chinnappa was recruited for a salary of Rs.15 with a 3-year contract.

== Career ==
Even though Chinnappa was offered small roles in Madurai Original Boys company, he used to perform other characters during his free time. One day in the company's house he was singing Sathi Anusaya stage play songs, his songs were heard by Sachidanantha Pillai, who was staying on the top floor of the company's house. Pillai started inquiring who has sung the songs and Chinnappa was asked to perform in front of him again. Pillai was very happy and instantly increased his salary from Rs.15 to Rs.75 at that moment and promoted Chinnappa as a hero.

When Chinnappa acted as hero, M. G. Ramachandran, P. G. Venkatesan, Ponnusamy and Alagesan were acting as female leads with him. Kali N. Ratnam and M. G. Chakrapani were acting in supporting roles.

Pathuga Pattabishekam was one of the very popular stage shows that generated good revenue for the Madurai Original Boys company. His performance as Bharathan character received rave reviews. Not only in historical stage acts, Chinnappa performed well in social stage acts like Chandrakantha Rajendran. Chinnappa was very prolific in singing too.

=== Switch from stage play to movies ===
In those days, Madurai Original Boys company used to celebrate boys with good talent, and once done they used to throw them away. Chinnappa has criticized this several times since he was singing for a long time, Chinnappa's voice was not as good as before. Knowing the fact that the company might throw him in future, Chinnappa quit the company secretly and came back to his native place, Pudukkotai.

After quitting he acted in fewer stage plays, having an interest in singing and classical music, he practiced with the help of Sundaresa Nayakkanar and Vedachala Baghavadar. He mastered all ragas and he almost became a Sangeetha Vidwan. However he didn't earn much from it, so he dropped the idea of becoming more affiliated to classical music. On the other side he also focused on sword fighting and Silambam under the guidance of Ramanatha Aasari. He also practiced wrestling under the guidance of Sando Somasundaram Chettiar. In addition to that, Chinnappa also did weight lifting, it was said that he lifted about 190 pounds in weight lifting and won various prizes in competitions. So Chinnapa tried various things, like acting in stage plays, participating in competitions like wrestling and Silambam. He also started his own gym as well as his own drama company. Whatever the field he was in, he dived deep in it and mastered.

Chinnappa was still doing his stage plays, at that time he did a stage play under a company called Star theaters. He went to Rangoon and played several stage plays aside M. G. Ramachandran, M. G. Chakrapani and several other actors at that time. He also went to Sri Lanka with M. R. Janaki and conducted several stage play's under Chinnappa Puliyampatti Company. Jupiter Pictures after seeing the Chandrakantha stage play and the performance of Chinnappa as Sundur prince, produced the movie with the same name and released in 1936 thus making Chinnappa debuting in mainstream movies.

=== Rise and Superstardom ===
After the debut, Chinnappa acted in 5 films, Punjab Kesari, Raja Mohan, Anadhai Penn, Yayathi and Mathruboomi. All those movies were moderately successful, because of which Chinnappa stayed away from movies for a while and lost opportunities in several movies. During this time, Chinnappa's voice also was not as before, he also stayed fasting for 40 days which made him lose weight. At that time T. R. Sundaram, who provided chances for unsuccessful actors and introducing new faces to Tamil cinema gave an opportunity for Chinnappa in Uthama Puthiran became a block buster, thus reviving the career of Chinnappa. Later he acted in several movies like Dhayalan, Dharmaveeran, Pruthivirajan and Manonmani, which ran very successfully. It was during this time, the competition between M. K. Thyagaraja Bhagavathar and Chinnappa intensified and their respective fans clashed.

Chinnappa acted in several movies for the next few years, notably Aryamala and Kannagi, which made him as a box office hero. Vanasundari, Ratnakumar and Sudarshan were the movies that Chinnappa acted in last. Sudharsan was released after his death, failing at the box office.

== Personal life ==
Chinnappa fell in love with A. Sakunthala when they acted together in the movie Prithvirajan. Chinnapa married Sakunthala on 5 July 1944. They had one son, P. U. C. Raja Bahadur.

Chinnappa spent his life being economical and invested a lot in buying houses. He brought about 30 houses in his home town Pudukkottai. At one time the Raja of Pudukkotai banned him from buying further houses in Pudukkotai and hence Chinnappa started buying houses in Madras (Present Chennai).

However, when he died, his wife Sakunthala and son P.U.C. Rajabhadhur were left virtually penniless. To this day no one knows how his houses and other assets vanished. His son debuted as an actor in Kovil Pura, which didn't run well, he later took up negative roles in few movies, then earned a modest living as a dubbing artist, and has worked with writers on dubbing projects.

== Death ==
Chinnappa and his friends went to see the movie Manamagal on 23 September 1951 which was produced and directed by N. S. Krishnan. After seeing the movie he came to his house by 10 p.m. While talking to his friends he fainted suddenly, vomited blood and died within few minutes. Chinnappa had the habit of smoking beedi and liquor. However, he remained healthy and was not hospitalized for it.

Chinnappa's funeral was held the next day, he was laid to rest in one of his farms. Thousands of people gathered and paid their last respects.

== Legacy ==
Chinnappa was one of the top celebrities in Tamil cinema between the late 1930s and 1940s. He was ranked next to the first superstar, M. K. Thyagaraja Bhagavathar. The dual domination of cinematic celebrities who attained demigod status in Tamil Nadu started with this pair.

Chinnappa's films are still in demand in the DVD format and some of them are also frequently aired on television.

== Filmography ==
Year	Film	Role	Notes
1936	Chandrakantha		
1937	Raja Mohan		
1938	Punjab Kesari		
1938	Anaadhai Penn		
1938	Yayathi		
1939	Mathru Bhoomi		
1940	Uthama Puthiran		
1941	Dharma Veeran		
1941	Aryamala		
1941	Dayalan		
1942	Prithivirajan		
1942	Kannagi		
1942	Manonmani		
1943	Kubera Kuchela		
1944	Harichandra		
1944	Jagathalapratapan		
1944	Mahamaya		
1946	Arthanaari		
1946	Vikatayogi		
1947	Pankajavalli		
1947	Thulasi Jalandar		
1949	Krishna Bakthi		
1949	Mangayarkarasi		
1949	Ratnakumar		
1951	Vanasundari		
1951	Sudharshan		
