= Sudharshan (film) =

- Theatrical release poster
- Directed by: A. S. A. Sami; Sundar Rao Nadkarni
- Screenplay by: A. S. A. Sami; Elangovan
- Story by: Sundar Rao Nadkarni
- Starring: P. U. Chinnappa; P. Kannamba; (Yogam) Mangalam; Lalitha; T. S. Balaiah; D. Balasubramaniam; P. B. Rangachari; C. K. Saraswathi
- Cinematography: P. Ramasamy; P. L. Roy; B. N. Konda Reddy
- Edited by: Sundar Rao Nadkarni; V. S. Raghavan
- Music by: G. Ramanathan
- Production company: Royal Talkies
- Distributed by: Royal Talkie Distributors
- Release date: 28 November 1951
- Country: India
- Language: Tamil

Sudharshan is a 1951 Indian Tamil-language film directed by A. S. A. Sami and Sundar Rao Nadkarni. The film stars P. U. Chinnappa and P. Kannamba. The story is based on a popular folk myth about a Panduranga devotee Gora who was a potter by trade. The same story was filmed simultaneously by Gemini Studios. The Gemini version Chakra Dhari was the first of the two films to be released, on 3 December 1948. Sudharshan was delayed due to unknown reasons, and was released on 28 November 1951.

== Cast ==
The cast according to the opening credits of the film

Male Cast

- P. U. Chinnappa as Gorakumbhar
- T. S. Balaiah as Namadhevar
- D. Balasubramaniam as Sevaji
- P. B. Rangachari as Pandurangan
- Radhakrishnan as Venkaji
- K. Sayeeram as Penda
- C. P. Kittan as Goldsmith

Female Cast

- P. Kannamba as Thulasi Bai
- Lalitha as Rukmani
- (Yoga) Mangalam as Shantha Bai
- C. K. Saraswathi as Sona

== Production ==
S. S. Vasan of Gemini Studios and Jupiter Pictures started producing the same story under different titles almost simultaneously. However, Gemini's version titled Chakradhari was released in 1948 and was successful at the box-office. Sudharsan was delayed for reasons unknown and was released almost 3 years later in 1951. Popular Carnatic musician and playback singer M. L. Vasanthakumari was cast initially to do the character of the second wife of Gora (PUC). She left the film for undisclosed reasons after a few reels were shot. She was replaced by Mangalam of the famous Yogam-Mangalam dance duo. Likewise, A. S. A. Sami who was directing the film, was replaced by Sundar Rao Nadkarni. P. U. Chinnappa who played the male lead role, died at a young age, before the film was released.

== Soundtrack ==
Music was composed by G. Ramanathan and the lyrics were penned by Papanasam Sivan and K. D. Santhanam. The singing star, P. U. Chinnappa sang many songs one of which, Anna sedan papa… was a hit.

| Song | Singer/s | Lyricist | Duration(m:ss) |
|---|---|---|---|
| "Anna Sedan Papa" | P. U. Chinnappa | | 03:01 |
| "Paanduranga Naamam" | P. B. Rangachari | | 03:00 |
| "Sree Dhaamodharaa Jeyasegaraa" | P. U. Chinnappa | | 01:49 |
| "UnakkEn Veen Kavalai" | P. U. Chinnappa & P. Kannamba | | 02:09 |
| "Unnadiyil Anbu Vaitthen" | P. U. Chinnappa | | 03:22 |
| "Unnai Kandu Mayamngaadha Pergal Undo" | P. A. Periyanayaki | | 03:09 |
| "Ulagame Sandhai Koottamada.... Paaril Sandhai Koottam" | P. A. Periyanayaki | K. D. Santhanam | 03:01 |
| "Suya Muyarchiyaale" | P. U. Chinnappa & T. R. Gajalakshmi | K. D. Santhanam | 02:52 |
| "Palavagai Vadivulla Pangkajavaradhaa" | P. U. Chinnappa & P. Kannamba | | 01:13 |
| "Thirukkan Kaatthaan" | P. U. Chinnappa | | 03:08 |
| "Enna Seidhaai Appa" | P. U. Chinnappa | | 04:41 |
