= Abhimanyu (1948 film) =

- Theatrical release poster
- Directed by: M. Somasundaram; A. Kasilingam
- Screenplay by: A. S. A. Sami
- Starring: S. M. Kumaresan; U. R. Jeevarathnam
- Cinematography: W. R. Subbarao
- Edited by: A. Kasilingam
- Music by: S. M. Subbaiah Naidu; C. R. Subburaman
- Production company: Jupiter Pictures
- Release date: 6 May 1948
- Running time: 180 minutes
- Country: India
- Language: Tamil

Abhimanyu is a 1948 Tamil-language film produced by Jupiter Pictures and starring S. M. Kumaresan as Abhimanyu, a character from the Mahabharatha. The screenplay was written by A. S. A. Sami, while M. Karunanidhi assisted in the script, but uncredited for his work. This was the second film for Karunanidhi as scriptwriter. The film also starred M. N. Nambiar in a supporting role.

== Plot ==
The film tells the story of Abhimanyu, one of the five Pandava brothers.

== Cast ==
Male cast

- S. M. Kumaresan as Abhimanyu
- P. V. Narasimha Bharathi as Krishnan
- S. V. Subbaiah as Shakuni
- M. G. Ramachandar as Arjunan
- M. N. Nambiar as Lakkanan
- D. Balasubramaniam as Duryodhanan
- Pulimoottai T. R. Ramasami as Ghatorkachan
- M. G. Chakrapani as Balarama
- N. S. Narayana Pillai as Dronar
- M. K. Mustafa as Karnan
- T. M. Ramasami Pillai as Jankilimama
- Nat Annaji Rao as Vidurar
- K. Ramasami as Surapuli
- S. A. Natarajan as Jayadrathan
- B. Rajagopala Iyer as Dharumar
- N. Shankaramoorthi as Aravan
- T. D. Srinivasan as Dushathanan

Female cast

- U. R. Jeevarathnam as Vathsala
- M. R. Santhanalakshmi as Subhadra
- R. Malathi as Rukmani
- C. K. Saraswathi as Revathi
- M. S. S. Bhagyam as Magic Girl
- K. S. Angamuthu as Rioter
- K. Lakshmikantha as Magic Girl Dancer

== Production ==
Jupiter Pictures, a production company promoted by M. Somasundaram and S. K. Mohideen shifted to Madras from Coimbatore in 1948 after acquiring Neptune Studios. In 1948 they produced Abhimanyu, a mythological tale from the epic Mahabharatha at Madras. During the 1930s and the 40s Tamil films were mostly based on when mythologicals, folktales, folk myths and socially themed films were rare. Somasundaram himself directed the film along with A. Kasilingam. The script was written by A. S. A Sami and M. Karunanidhi. This was the second film for Karunanidhi as script writer after Rajakumaari (1947). M. G. Ramachandran and M. N. Nambiar played supporting roles in the film. The film's music was composed by S. M. Subbaiah and C. R. Subbaraman. S. S. Rajendran was cast in the title role, but was relieved after only two weeks of shooting from the film as T. K. Muthusamy of the TKS Brothers drama troupe revealed that Rajendran was still under contract with them, and threatened legal action if the film continued production. Thus the role went to newcomer S. M. Kumaresan.

== Soundtrack ==
The music was composed by S. M. Subbaiah Naidu and C. R. Subburaman while the lyrics were penned by Papanasam Sivan, T. K. Sundara Vadhyar and Bhoomi Baalagadas. Singers are U. R. Jeevarathinam, M. R. Santhanalakshmi and Friend Ramasamy. Playback singers Thiruchi Loganathan, M. M. Mariappa and K. V. Janaki, were uncredited.

S. No.	Song title	Singers	Lyrics	Duration (mm:ss)
1	"Pudhu Vasandhamaame Vaazhvile"	Thiruchi Loganathan & U. R. Jeevarathinam		01:59
2	"Madhanaa.... Ah En Sindhai"	U. R. Jeevarathinam		03:38
3	"Pudhu Malarin Azhage"	U. R. Jeevarathinam	Papanasam Sivan	02:09
4	"Oh Aiyamare Ammamare Vaanga"	Thiruchi Loganathan, Friend Ramasamy & K. V. Janaki		06:36
5	"Paaril Pirandhenna Punniyam"	M. M. Mariappa		02:57
6	"Ungal Mugaaravindham"	K. V. Janaki	Papanasam Sivan	01:57
7	"Arul Thazhaithongum"	M. R. Santhanalakshmi	Papanasam Sivan	02:38
8	"Pudhu Vasandhamaamey Vaazhvile"	Thiruchi Loganathan		02:55
9	"Pudhu Vasandhamaamey Vaazhvile"	Thiruchi Loganathan & U. R. Jeevarathinam		02:36
10	"Jeyame Jeyame Maname"	U. R. Jeevarathinam		02:25

== Release and reception ==
Abhimanyu was released on 6 May 1948.
