= Tamizhariyum Perumal =

Tamizhariyum Perumal தமிழறியும் பெருமாள்
- Film Poster
- Directed by: T. R. Raghunath
- Written by: Elangovan (story & dialogies)
- Produced by: RM. Ramanathan Chettiar
- Starring: V. A. Chellappa; M. G. Ramachandran; M. R. Santhanalakshmi; R. Balasubramaniam; T. S. Durairaj; M. S. Devasena; M. G. Chakrapani
- Music by: Saraswathi Stores
- Distributed by: Uma Pictures
- Release date: 30 April 1942
- Language: Tamil

Tamizhariyum Perumal (Tamil: தமிழறியும் பெருமாள்) is a Tamil language film starring V. A. Chellappa, M. G. Ramachandran and M. R. Santhanalakshmi. The film was released in 1942.

== Plot ==
The story was adapted from the tale of Kalidasa, Sanskrit poet and dramatist.

== Cast ==
Actor	Role
V. A. Chellappa	Nakkeerar
M. R. Santhanalakshmi	Thamizh Ariyum Perumal
M. G. Ramachandran	Santhanakumaran
R. Balasubramaniam	
T. S. Durairaj	a wood cutter
M. S. Devasena	Devadasi
M. G. Chakrapani	
C. T. Rajakantham	
T. S. Jaya	
Kumari Mangalam (later Yoga - Mangalam)	
S. Yogambal (later Yoga - Mangalam)	
K. N. Rajalakshmi	
V. Nataraj	

== Soundtrack ==
Lyrics were written by Udumalai Narayana Kavi. No one was given credit as music composer. Saraswathi Stores orchestra provided the music for songs sung by the artistes. The song "Kalviyai pol" sung by V. A. Chellappa was a popular number.

== Reception ==
In spite of good photography and music Tamizhariyum Perumal was not a commercial success. In 2011, film historian Randor Guy said it would be "remembered for the impressive sets, cinematography and pleasing music and being an early film of the later day icon and cult figure M.G. Ramachandran." In his autobiography, MGR had written that for his role he was paid 300 rupees for the entire movie.
