= Ozhuginasery =

- Neighbourhood
- Ozhuginasery, Kanyakumari (Tamil Nadu)
- Coordinates: 8.1895°N 77.4379°E
- Country: India
- State: Tamil Nadu
- District: Kanyakumari district
- Elevation: 67 m (220 ft)

Languages
  - Official: Tamil, English
  - Speech: Tamil, English
- Time zone: UTC+5:30 (IST)
- PIN: 629001
- Telephone Code: +914652
- Vehicle registration: TN 74 yy xxxx
- Neighbourhoods: Nagercoil, Kottar, Vadiveeswaram, Vadasery, Thiruppathisaram, Thovalai, Edalakudy, Elankadai and Suchindram
- Corporation: Nagercoil Municipal Corporation
- LS: Kanniyakumari Lok Sabha constituency
- VS: Nagercoil Assembly constituency
- MP: Vijay Vasanth
- MLA: M. R. Gandhi

Ozhuginasery is a neighbourhood in Kanyakumari district of Tamil Nadu state in the peninsular India.

Ozhuginasery is located at an altitude of about 67 m above the mean sea level with the geographical coordinates of 8.1895°N 77.4379°E.

The Pazhayar river passes through Ozhuginasery.

The birthplace of past comedian actor N. S. Krishnan is Ozhuginasery.

Ozhuginasery has a Government educational institution viz., K. N. S. K. (Kalaivanar N. S. Krishnan) Government Primary School and a private educational institution viz., The Rajas International School.

There is an old Hindu temple namely Chozharaja temple in Ozhuginasery.
