= D. Balasubramaniam =

Indian actor

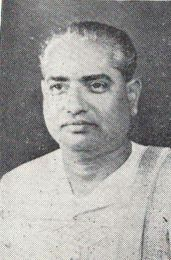
- D. Balasubramaniam
- Occupation: Tamil actor
- Years active: 1940s to late 1950s

D. Balasubramaniam was an Indian actor in Tamil cinema from the 1940s to the late 1950s. He was well known for his roles in mythological films and later switched to character roles.

== Filmography ==
Year	Film
1940	Krishnan Thoothu
1942	Gangavathar
1943	Kubera Kuchela
1944	Jagathalapratapan
1944	Prabhavathi
1944	Mahamaya
1945	En Magan
1946	Valmiki
1946	Udayanan Vasavadatta
1946	Vidyapathi
1947	Kannika
1947	Paithiyakkaran
1948	Abhimanyu
1948	Gnana Soundari
1949	Krishna Bakthi
1949	Rathnakumar
1949	Velaikaari
1949	Rathnakumar
1950	Digambara Samiyar
1951	Devaki
1951	Singari
1951	Sudharshan
1951	Vanasundari
1952	Kalyani
1952	Zamindar
1953	Ammalakkalu (Telugu)
1953	Auvaiyar
1954	Ponni
1954	En Magal
1954	Malaikkallan
1955	Kalvanin Kadhali
1955	Maaman Magal
1955	Menaka
1955	Porter Kandan
1955	Kaveri
1955	Gomathiyin Kaadhalan
1956	Mathar Kula Manickam
1956	Sabaash Meena
1957	Mayabazar
1959	Vannakili
1959	President Panchatcharam
1959	Thaai Magalukku Kattiya Thaali
1959	Uzhavukkum Thozhilukkum Vandhanai Seivom
1960	Thilakam
