= Ratnakumar =

Rathnakumar
- Theatrical release poster
- Directed by: Krishnan–Panju
- Screenplay by: P. P. Velayutham
- Story by: B. S. Ramiah
- Starring: P. U. Chinnappa; P. Bhanumathi
- Cinematography: P. S. Selvaraj
- Edited by: S. Panju
- Music by: G. Ramanathan; C. R. Subbaraman
- Production company: Murugan Talkies
- Release date: 15 December 1949
- Running time: 145 minutes
- Country: India
- Language: Tamil

Ratnakumar is a 1949 Indian Tamil-language film starring P. U. Chinnappa and P. Bhanumathi. M. G. Ramachandran played a supporting role. The film was released on 15 December 1949.

== Plot ==
Despite his poverty, the protagonist Rathnakumar woos and wins the hand of Bhanumati. At the bidding of the hero, a skeleton hurls a giant rock on the ground, and diamonds, rubies and emeralds pop out. Falling into evil company, he becomes addicted to vices that make him ill-treat his wife and then desert her without any qualms. He proceeds to fall for a beautiful princess and impresses her under false pretence. However, he eventually receives his comeuppance as his dubious past is revealed and he is imprisoned. Thereupon his conscience awakes and he is filled with remorse at the thought of his patient wife. Rathnakumar is an ordinary man of shifting loyalties, greed, lust, deceit and ultimately penitence.

== Cast ==
Male cast

- P. U. Chinnappa as Rathnakumar
- M. G. Ramachandran as Balathevan
- Nagarcoil Mahadevan
- D. Balasubramanyam
- N. S. Krishnan as Begger
- T. S. Durairaj
- K. Radhakrishnan as Kingdom's guard
- K. P. Kesavan
- T. P. Ponnusami Pillai
- C. S. Pandian

Female cast

- P. Bhanumathi as Malathi
- T. A. Mathuram as Nandini
- K. Malathi
- Parvathi

== Soundtrack ==
The music was composed by G. Ramanathan and C. R. Subbaraman. The lyrics were written by Papanasam Sivan and Surabhi. C. R. Subburaman had K. Malathi sing a solo and a duet with PUC in this film. Although she was a talented singer, this was the only film she sang in.

| Song | Singers | Lyrics | Length (m:ss) |
|---|---|---|---|
| "Aahaa Adhisayam Idhaame Iraivane Unadhu Leelaiyin" | P. U. Chinnappa | | |
| "Nin Paaadham Varave Thaaye Nee Dhayai Purivaaiye" | P. Bhanumathi | | |
| "Ganavaangale Vaango" | P. U. Chinnappa & P. Bhanumathi | | |
| "Unnarulaal Indha Udal Valarum" | N. S. Krishnan | | |
| "Mahaaraajargale Maharaasigale" | P. U. Chinnappa | | |
| "Nam Vaazhvenum Solaiyil" | P. U. Chinnappa & P. A. Periyanayagi | | 04:38 |
| "Varattum Vandhaal Vazhi Solven" | P. Bhanumathi | | |
| "Keli MigacheivaaL Kettadhellaam Thaan Tharuvaal" | P. U. Chinnappa | | |
| "Thevaikku Mel Serppavan" | N. S. Krishnan | | |
| "Vizhudhu Vittu Thazhaithongi" | P. Bhanumathi | | |
| "Andhi Nerame Inbame" | P. U. Chinnappa & P. Bhanumathi | | |
| "Aaha Enadi Kiliye" | K. Malathi | | |
| "Sollarum Aanandham Enadhu Vaazhvil Indre Dhuraiye" | P. U. Chinnappa & P. Bhanumathi | | |
| "Muzhuthunnai Nambinen" | P. Bhanumathi | | |
| "Andru Thalaiyil Avan" | | | |
| "Aanandha Velaam" | P. U. Chinnappa & P. Bhanumathi | | |
| "Aadavar Kaadhal Idhudhaano" | P. Bhanumathi | | |

== Reception ==
The film did poorly at the box office.
