= Aryamala =

1941 film by Bomman Irani

- Theatrical release poster
- Directed by: Bomman Irani
- Written by: T. C. Vadivelu Naicker
- Produced by: K. S. Narayanan Iyengar; S. M. Sriramulu Naidu
- Starring: P. U. Chinnappa; M. S. Sarojini
- Cinematography: Rustam M. Irani
- Edited by: S. Surya
- Music by: G. Ramanathan
- Production company: Pakshiraja Films
- Distributed by: Narayanan & Company
- Release date: 19 October 1941
- Running time: 218 minutes
- Country: India
- Language: Tamil

Aryamala is a 1941 Indian Tamil-language film starring P. U. Chinnappa, M. S. Sarojini, M. R. Santhanalakshmi and T. S. Balaiah. Aryamala was a major box office success and established Chinnappa as a box office hero.

The Tamil film Kathavarayan was made in 1958, based on the same folk myth.

== Plot ==
This is a folk myth in which Hindu deity Shiva produces a third son named Kathavarayan who is brought up by hunters. Kathavarayan falls in love with a celestial girl named Ilankanni. When Kathavarayan tries to make love to her, she drowns herself and is reborn as a princess named Aryamala. Kathavarayan falls in love with her and tries many tricks, changing his form into various creatures. Once he turns into a parrot and goes to her palace. She becomes fond of the parrot. He takes his usual form and ties knot to Aryamala while she is sleeping. Aryamala is shocked and she tries to drown herself again.amd Vishnu saves her. He turns her into a stone. Later when Kathavarayan touches the stone Aryamala regains her form. Kathavarayan is imprisoned by the King. Vishnu intervenes and settles everything amicably. Kathavarayan and Aryamala are married and lived happily ever after.

== Cast ==
The following list was adapted from the film titles (See External links) and the song book

Male cast

- P. U. Chinnappa as Kathavarayan
- T. S. Balaiah as Balarayan
- N. S. Krishnan as Chinnaan
- Vasudeva Rao B.A., B.L. as Aryappoorajan
- S. Krishna Sastri as Appa Pattar
- V. V. S. Mani as Sri Krishnan
- B. Rajagopala Iyer as Paramasivan
- Kolathumani as Mannaru (Washerman)
- K. R. Nagaraja Iyer as Somesa Arya
- N. Thyagarajan B.A. as Hunters' King
- Sivan as Beggar Boy

Female cast

- M. R. Santhanalakshmi as Parvathi
- M. S. Saroja as Aryamala
- T. A. Mathuram as Aaravalli
- A. Sakunthala as Sornamalai
- Seethalakshmi as Thulasi Ammal
- P. S. Gnanam as Vannaravalli
- P. S. Chandra as Chinnarangam
- A. R. Sakunthala as Vasanthi
- L. Saroja as Malathi
- M. K. Bapuji as Nirmala
- S. R. Janaki as Kali Devi
- T. M. Pattammal as Dancer

== Soundtrack ==
No	Title	Singer(s)	Length
1	"Aaravalliyae Neeyum"	N. S. Krishnan, T. A. Madhuram	
2	"Aananda Roobiniye Aaryamaalaa"	P. U. Chinnappa	
3	"Siva Kribaiyaal"	P. U. Chinnappa	
4	"Srimadhiye Unai Naan"	P. U. Chinnappa	
5	"Valaiyal Nalla Valaiyal"	P. U. Chinnappa	
6	"Nimmathiye"	P. U. Chinnappa	
7	"Anandha Roopiniye"	P. U. Chinnappa	
8	"Laavanya Roobane"	M. R. Santhanalakshmi	

== Release ==
Aryamala was released on 19 October 1941, and distributed by Narayanan & Company.
