= M. R. Santhanalakshmi =

Tamil film actress

M. R. Santhanalakshmi எம். ஆர். சந்தானலட்சுமி
- Santhanalakshmi in Prahalada
- Born: 1905; Kumbakonam, Madras Presidency
- Died: 1957 (aged 51–52)
- Occupation: Actor
- Years active: 1935–1956

M. R. Santhanalakshmi (Tamil: எம். ஆர். சந்தானலட்சுமி; 1905–1957) was a Tamil film actress in India who played lead roles in movies of the 1930s and 1940s.

== Filmography ==
Year	Title	Role	Notes
1935	Radha Kalyanam	Radha	
1936	Chandrahasan		
1937	Ambikapathy	Princess Amaravathi	
1939	Prahalada	Leelavathi	
1940	Sathi Murali	Murali and Lord Krishna	
1941	Aryamala	Goddess Parvathi	
1942	Aaraichi Mani or Manuneethi Chozhan		
1942	Prithvirajan		
1942	Tamizhariyum Perumal	Thamizh Ariyum Perumal	
1943	Dhaasippen or Jothi Malar		
1944	Baktha Hanuman		
1944	Jagathalapratapan	Prince Jagathalapratapan's mother	
1944	Rajarajeswari	Goddess Parvathi	
1945	Saalivaahanan		
1946	Aaravalli Sooravalli		
1947	Kannika	Kannika	
1948	Abhimanyu	Subhadra	
1948	Mariamman		
1952	Kanchana		
1953	Manampol Mangalyam		
1956	Madurai Veeran	Madurai Veeran's Mother	
1956	Kaalam Maari Pochu		
1956	Kula Deivam		
1956	Aasai	Anjugam	
1957	Pudhaiyal		
