= Nallathambi (1949 film) =

- Theatrical release poster
- Directed by: Krishnan–Panju
- Screenplay by: C. N. Annadurai
- Story by: C. N. Annadurai
- Produced by: N. S. Krishnan
- Starring: N. S. Krishnan; T. A. Mathuram; P. Bhanumathi
- Cinematography: V. Kumaradevan
- Edited by: S. Panjabi
- Music by: C. R. Subbaraman
- Production company: N. S. K. Films
- Release date: 4 February 1949
- Running time: 192 minutes
- Country: India
- Language: Tamil

Nallathambi is a 1949 Indian Tamil-language film starring and produced by N. S. Krishnan. The film's script was written by C. N. Annadurai (later chief minister of Tamil Nadu). This film marked Annadurai's debut in Tamil films. The movie is an adaptation of the 1936 American movie Mr. Deeds Goes to Town.

== Plot ==
Nallathambi (NSK), a simple rural man, inherits an estate from a deceased Zamindar relative. The Zamindar's daughter Pushpa (Bhanumathi) falls in love with Nallathambi. However he loves another girl (T. A. Madhuram). Bhoopathy (Sahasranamam), the estate manager, has his eye on the wealth and tries to cheat Nallathambi out of it. He goads Pushpa into filing a suit that Nallathambi is mentally insane. In the end Nallathambi defeats Bhoopathy's machinations.

== Cast ==
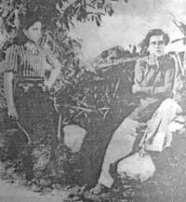
Screenshot from Nallathambi

Adapted from the film credits:

Male Cast

- N. S. Krishnan as Zamindar Thambidurai
- S. V. Sahasranamam as Bhoopathi
- D. V. Narayanasami
- Pulimootai Ramasami as Thambidurai's friend
- Kaka Radhakrishnan as Beggar
- C. S. Pandian

Female Cast

- T. A. Mathuram as Rani
- P. Bhanumathi as Pushpa
- M. N. Rajam as Orphan
- T. K. Kantha
- S. R. Janaki

== Production ==
Tamil film actor and Annadurai's friend M. Nallathambi saw the 1936 film Mr. Deeds Goes to Town during a successful theatrical run in the late 1940s in Madras. He thought it would be a good story to remake for his friend N. S. Krishnan (NSK). He convinced Annadurai to watch the movie and adapt the film to a Tamil rural setting. The film was titled Nallathambi (lit. The good younger brother). However, during filming, NSK heavily modified the script, reducing the role of the character played by Bhanumathi Ramakrishna and introducing another character to be played by his wife and comedian T. A. Mathuram. The script was further changed to include a number of musical skits to bring out the social satire of NSK. "Vinganatha Valarkka porendi" (lit. I am going to the nurture science, girl!) and Kindanar kathakalatchepam (a parody of the story of Nandanar and a telling of B. R. Ambedkar's life story) were two of the musical skits thus included. With the modifications, the plot was sidelined and importance was given to the socio-political messages and themes. The director duo of R. Krishnan and S. Panju were hired to direct the film. C. R. Subburaman composed the music, while Udumalai Narayana Kavi wrote the lyrics for the songs. M. N. Rajam, Sahasranamam and V. K. Ramasamy were cast in supporting roles.

== Reception ==
The film was a commercial failure and a critical success. Its songs became hits and were popular. The musical skit "Kindanar Kalatchepam" became popular. To offset the financial loss of his backers, NSK announced a new film project titled Thambithurai to be written by Annadurai. However furious with the changes made to his Nallathambi script, Annadurai refused to work with NSK again.

== Soundtrack ==
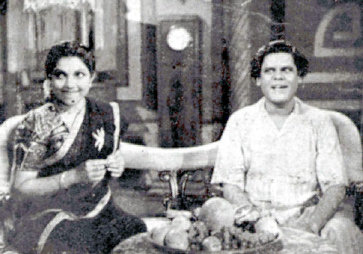
Nallathambi 1949 film

The music was composed by C. R. Subbaraman. Lyrics by Udumalai Narayana Kavi and K. P. Kamatchi. Singers are N. S. Krishnan, T. A. Mathuram and P. Bhanumathi. Playback singers are Ghantasala, C. S. Jayaraman, M. M. Mariyappa and M. L. Vasanthakumari.

No.	Song	Singers	Lyrics	Length (m:ss)
1	"Naadu Sezhikka Venum" "Naattukku Sevai Seiyya" "Anniyargal Nammai Aaanda" "Raaja Raaja Maharaaja" "Thalaimudhalaaga Thozhilmuraiyaaga" "Kudi Keduththa Kudi" "Manushanaagi Ponen Ippo" "Kudichu Pazhaganum" "Viduthalai Viduthalai Viduthalai"	Chorus; N. S. Krishnan; N. S. Krishnan & T. A. Mathuram; M. M. Mariyappa; N. S. Krishnan; N. S. Krishnan & T. A. Mathuram; N. S. Krishnan; N. S. Krishnan; N. S. Krishnan	Udumalai Narayana Kavi	00:59; 01:42; 02:57; 02:37; 03:27; 02:26; 01:01; 01:01; 01:36
2	"Enadhu Uyir Egypttu"	P. Bhanumathi	Udumalai Narayana Kavi	03:09
3	"Malardhanil Oru Azhagu Mayil"	Ghantasala & P. Bhanumathi	Udumalai Narayana Kavi	02:57
4	"Gaanalolan Madhanagopaalan"	M. L. Vasanthakumari	Udumalai Narayana Kavi	02:34
5	"Varuvaare Dear Varuvaare"	P. Bhanumathi	Udumalai Narayana Kavi	02:48
7	"Kindhan Saritthirame Kindal Allave Alla"	N. S. Krishnan	Udumalai Narayana Kavi	15:09
8	"Naan Vanangum Dheivam"	P. Bhanumathi	Udumalai Narayana Kavi	03:01
9	"Vignaanatha Valarkka Porendi"	N. S. Krishnan & T. A. Mathuram	Udumalai Narayana Kavi	03:11
10	"Ettu Ezhu Aaru"	T. A. Mathuram		02:26
11	"Viduthalai Viduthalai Viduthalai"	T. A. Mathuram		01:51
12	"Aazhi Neengi"	C. S. Jayaraman		02:00
13	"Aazhi Neengi"	M. M. Mariyappa		02:31
14	"Podhunalam Kandomamma"	C. S. Jayaraman &		02:10
15	"Sagaadha Charitthira Pugazh"	N. S. Krishnan		02:14
