= Kunnakudi Venkatarama Iyer =

Kunnakudi Venkatarama Iyer

Kunnakudi Venkatarama Iyer was an Indian Carnatic musician and film music Director during the 1940s and 50s. He learned Carnatic music from Namakkal Sesha Aiyangar. He is a recipient of Kalaimamani award conferred by the State government of Tamil Nadu.

== Some of the film songs composed by him ==
- Nadaiyalangkaram Kanden - Kubera Kuchela (1943), Raga: Karaharapriya
- Selvame Suga Jeevatharam - Kubera Kuchela (1943), Raga: Sama
- Ellorum Nallavare.. - Krishna Bakthi (1949)
- Kalaimagal Devakumari - Krishna Bakthi (1949)
- Poovaiyar Karpin perumai - Krishna Bakthi (1949)
- Saarasam Vaseekara Krishna Bakthi (1949)
- Vaseekara Kangal - Krishna Bakthi (1949)
- Vinnil Parandhu sellum Venpurave - Mangaiyarkarasi (1949)
- Paarthaal Pasi theerum Mangaiyarkarasi (1949)

== Films for which he composed music ==
- Punjab Kesari (1938)
- Kubera Kuchela (1943)
- Mahamaya (1944)
- Krishna Bakthi (1949)
- Mangaiyarkarasi (1949)
- Penn Manam (1952)
