= M. G. Chakrapani =

Indian actor (1911–1986)

- Born: Maruthur Gopalan Neelakandan (Stage Name Chakrapani); 13 January 1911; Vadavannur Palakkad (Madras presidency), British India
- Died: 17 August 1986 (aged 75); Madras (now Chennai), Tamil Nadu, India
- Other name: Ettan
- Occupations: Actor, film producer
- Years active: 1936–1986
- Spouse: Meenakshi Neelakandan
- Children: 10
- Relatives: M. G. Ramachandran (brother)

Maruthur Gopalan Neelakandan M. G. Chakrapani stage name (13 January 1911 – 17 August 1986), commonly known as Eattan ("elder brother" in Malayalam), was an Indian actor and producer based in the Tamil film industry. He was the elder brother of actor-politician M. G. Ramachandran.

== Early life ==
Chakrapani was born in Vadavannur, Palakkad (Madras Presidency now Kerala), on 13 January 1911. His parents, Gopala Menon and Sathyabhama, named him Neelakantan, but this was soon changed to Chakrapani because of his father's religious beliefs. Soon after his birth, the family migrated to Ceylon (now Sri Lanka) where Chakrapani's two younger siblings (brother M. G. Ramachandran and a sister) were born. Gopala Menon worked as a magistrate in Kandy, until he suffered an early death. Chakrapani's sister also died while they were in Ceylon.

Sathyabhama took her sons to Kumbakonam to be close to her brother. Chakrapani studied at Yanaiadi School, but left after the seventh grade. His mother then enrolled him and Ramachandran in the Madurai Original Boys Company (MOBC), a professional Tamil theatre company.

== Career ==
Chakrapani made his Tamil cinema debut in Iru Sahodarargal in 1936. Maya Machhindra and Tamizhariyum Perumal came next, where he began to be known as a character actor. His breakout role came in 1944 with Mahamaya. His character, Neelan, is believed to have been modelled after the Indian philosopher Chanakya. Though Mahamaya was a box office failure, Chakrapani's lines continue to be spoken. His acting in the role of police inspector in Malai kallan and as villain in En Thangai are notable. He had a very good role in Nadodi Mannan. His big success came some years later with Thaai Magalukku Kattiya Thaali, where he again played a villain.

Later in his career, Chakrapani transitioned from actor to director and producer, managing his brother's career. Chakrapani worked with his brother on several projects which failed to see the light of day. One such film, Bhavani had Ramachandran in the lead role. It was written by A. K. Velan, directed by Masthan, with Chakrapani producing. Years later, Chakrapani tried again, this time taking the director's seat in the renamed Arasa Kattalai. It was a success.

== Personal life and death ==
Chakrapani was married to Meenakshi. They had 10 children together including seven sons and three daughters. Chakrapani died on 17 August 1986 at the age of 75.

== Filmography ==
Year	Film	Roles	Notes	Ref.
1936	Iru Sahodarargal	Police inspector	Billed as G. Chakrapani	
1939	Maya Machhindra			
1939	Jothi			
1942	Tamizhariyum Perumal			
1944	Mahamaya	Neelan		
1946	Sri Murugan			
1947	1000 Thalaivangi Apoorva Chinthamani			
1948	Abhimanyu	Balaraman		
1948	Raja Mukthi	Minister		
1950	Ponmudi	Tribal Chief		
1950	Thigambara Samiar	Magistrate Pattabhirama Pillai		
1950	Maruthanad Elavarasee	Minister		
1950	Ithaya Geetham	Minister		
1951	Vanasundari			
1952	Amarakavi			
1952	En Thangai	Rajendran's uncle		
1952	Kalyani	Doctor		
1953	Naam	Sanjeevi		
1953	Genova	General Annas	Malayalam-Tamil film	
1954	Malaikkallan	Sub Inspector		
1954	En Magal	Mirasdar		
1956	Alibabavum 40 Thirudargalum	Amir Kasim Khan		
1957	Raja Rajan	Uthselan Kavirayar		
1958	Nadodi Mannan	Karmegam		
1959	Thaai Magalukku Kattiya Thaali	Sundara Mudaliar		
1959	Nalla Theerpu			
1960	Raja Desingu	Nawab of Arcot		
1960	Mannathi Mannan	King Karikala Chozhan		
1962	Raani Samyuktha			
1967	Arasa Kattalai		Also director	
1969	Nam Naadu		Also producer	
1972	Idhaya Veenai	Sivaraman		
1974	Netru Indru Naalai	Manavalan Thangappapuram		
1975	Naalai Namadhe			
