= T. A. Mathuram =

Indian actress and playback singer

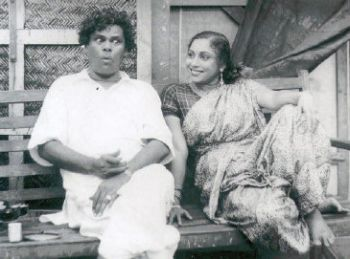
- N.S. Krishnan and T. A. Mathuram from the 1947 Tamil film Paithiakaran
- Born: 14 October 1918; Srirangam, Trichinopoly District, Madras Presidency, British India (now Tiruchirappalli district, Tamil Nadu, India)
- Died: 23 May 1974 (aged 55); Madras (now Chennai), Tamil Nadu, India
- Occupation: Actress
- Spouse: N. S. Krishnan

T. A. Mathuram (14 October 1918 – 23 May 1974) was an Indian actress and playback singer.

== Biography and career ==
Mathuram was born in Srirangam on 14 October 1918 in a family of artists. Her first Tamil film was Ratnavali, released in 1935. Her next film was Vasantha Sena, produced in Poone and released in 1936. In this film, she paired with N. S. Krishnan, whom she married later.

She and Krishnan became a popular comedy duo in South Indian cinema.

Playback singer Ramya NSK is a granddaughter of Mathuram.

Mathuram died in a road accident in 1974.

== Filmography ==
- Ratnavali (1935)
- Vasantha Sena (1936)
- Baktha Thulasidas (1937)
- Ambikapathy (1937)
- Jothi Ramalinga Swamigal (1939)
- Maya Machhindra (1939)
- Pandurangan (1939)
- Prahalada (1939)
- Naveena Vikramadityan (1940)
- Aryamala (1941)
- Ashok Kumar (1941)
- Vedavathi Alladhu Seetha Jananam (1941)
- Alibabavum 40 Thirudargalum (1941)
- Kannagi (1942)
- Manonmani (1942)
- Sivakavi (1943)
- Mangamma Sabatham (1943)
- Haridas (1944)
- Poompaavai (1944)
- Bharthruhari (1944)
- Paithiyakkaran (1947)
- Chandralekha (1948)
- Amarakavi (1948)
- Nallathambi (1949)
- Ratnakumar (1949)
- Mangayarkarasi (1949)
- Inbavalli (1949),
- Parijatham (1950)
- Laila Majnu (1950)
- Manamagal (1951)
- Vanasundari (1951)
- Panam (1952)
- Mudhal Thethi (1955)
- Madurai Veeran (1956)
- Ambikapathy (1957)
- Yaar Paiyan? (1957)
