= N. S. Krishnan =

Indian actor

- Born: 29 November 1908; Nagercoil, Southern Division, Kingdom of Travancore, British India (now part of Kanyakumari District, Tamil Nadu, India)
- Died: 30 August 1957 (aged 48); Madras, Madras State (now Chennai, Tamil Nadu), India
- Occupation: Actor
- Years active: 1935–1957
- Works: Filmography
- Spouse(s): Nagammal (m. 1931) T. A. Mathuram (m. 1939)
- Children: 1

Nagercoil Sudalaimuthu Krishnan, popularly known as Kalaivanar (lit. 'Lover of arts') and also as NSK, (29 November 1908 – 30 August 1957) was an Indian actor, comedian, dancer, playback singer and screenwriter in the early stages of the Tamil film industry – in the 1940s and 1950s. He is considered as the "Charlie Chaplin of India." His stage and cine-screen comedy performances were unique and always carried a message for the people.

== Early life ==
He was born into a Vellalar family in Ozhuginasery, Nagercoil, in the princely state of Travancore, India on 29 November 1908. He grew up in poverty and supported himself by selling sweets.

== Career ==
He started his acting career in a drama troupe and became a top stage actor before switching to film. Krishnan and T. A. Mathuram became a popular comedy duo in South Indian cinema. They were later married. They starred in around 100 films together and few South Indian films were made at the time without them appearing.

As well as acting, he produced films including Nallathambi (1949).

He also excelled as a folk dancer.

== Murder accusation ==
N. S. Krishnan was accused in the Lakshmikanthan murder case along with the then-famous lead actor Thyagaraja Bhagavathar. This had a major impact on his artistic career. He was acquitted a few months before India gained independence. After spending approximately 30 months in prison, he was released and began acting in films again. However, a significant portion of his wealth had been depleted due to the legal proceedings.

== Personal life ==
He was first married to Nagammai, then to actress Mathuram and later to her younger sister T. A.Vembammal. His grandson NSK Rajan has acted in the film Nagareega Komaali (2006). His granddaughters Anu Vardhan and Ramya NSK work as a costume designer and a playback singer in the film industry, respectively.

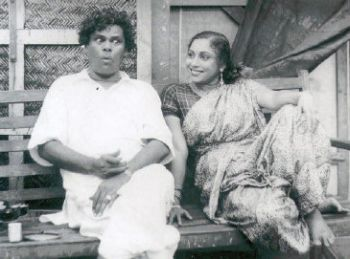
Paithiakaran 1947 film

== Death ==
N.S. Krishnan had been undergoing treatment for alcohol-induced hepatitis since 12 August 1957. He died at the General Hospital, Madras on 30 August 1957 following complications of the disease. His funeral was attended by more than 100,000 people.

== Legacy ==
- Politician Karunanidhi, when asked once by a journalist (of the Tamil magazine Kumudham) about who the non-political hero in his life was, answered it was Kalaivanar. Karunanidhi knew him well and worked in some of his film projects.
- Kalaivanar was an active member of the Dravidian Movement. Kalaivanar Arangam (or Kalaivanar Arts Centre) was named after him. The building is one of the leading landmarks in the city of Chennai, the capital of Tamil Nadu. It briefly housed the Tamil Nadu Assembly in the 1950s.
