= List of Tamil films of 1946 =

The following is a list of films produced in the Tamil film industry in India in 1946, in alphabetical order.

== 1946 ==
Title	Director	Production	Music	Cast	Release date (D-M-Y)
Aaravalli Sooravalli	C. V. Raman	Southern Theatres	G. Ramanathan	K. Thavamani Devi, P. S. Govindan, V. A. Chellappa, M. R. Santhanalakshmi, Serukulathur Sama, Kali N. Rathnam, P. S. Sivabaghyam, C. T. Rajakantham	02-02-1946
Arthanaari	T. R. Raghunath	Kalaivani Films, Madras United Artists Corporation	Madras United Artistes Corporation Music Party	P. U. Chinnappa, T. R. Ramachandran, M. S. Saroja, M. V. Rajamma, N. S. Krishnan, T. A. Madhuram, Kali N. Rathnam	07-02-1946
Chitra	Raja Wahab Kashmiri	Modern Theatres	T. A. Kalyanam	K. L. V. Vasantha, T. S. Balaiah, T. S. Durairaj, K. K. Perumal, M. E. Madhavan, V. S. Susheela	
Kumaraguru	Jyotish Sinha	Chitrakala Movietone	R. Narayana Iyer	D. S. Krishna Iyer, Vithvan Mani, Tanjore Mani, Jeyabala, Radha	06-09-1946
Lavangi	Y. V. Rao	Sri Jagadheesh Films	C. R. Subburaman & H. R. Padmanabha Sastry	Y. V. Rao, Rukmini, B. R. Panthulu, B. S. Jayamma, Vinjamuri Varadaraja Ayyangar, K. R. Jayagowri, T. R. Ramachandran, K. Sarangapani, K. R. Chellam and dance by Miss Azurie	10-05-1946
Ram Raheem or Por Veeran Manaivi		Victory Films		G. M. Basheer	
Sakata Yogam	R. Padmanaban	R. Padmanaban		Kothamangalam Seenu, T. R. Ramachandran, Vidvan Srinivasan, T. S. Durairaj, Kali N. Rathnam, V. N. Janaki, Mayavaram Pappa, P. A. Periyanayaki, C. T. Rajakantham	23-08-1946
Subathra	T. R. Sundaram	T. R. Sundaram, Modern Theatres	Papanasam Sivan	C. Honnappa Bhagavathar, K. L. V. Vasantha, Ganesa Bhagavathar, C. T. Rajakantham, T. S. Durairaj, Malathi, Serukalathur Sama, Leela	12-01-1946
Sri Murugan	M. Somasundaram & V. S. Narayanan	M. Somasundaram & S. K. Mohideen, Jupiter Pictures	S. M. Subbaiah Naidu & S. V. Venkatraman	C. Honnappa Bhagavathar, U. R. Jeevarathinam, M. G. Ramachandran, K. Malathi, Trichur Premavathi, Dr. O. R. Balu, (Yogam) Mangalam, Kali N. Rathnam, T. V. Kumudhini, P. S. Veerappa, Baby Harini	27-10-1946
Valmiki	Sundar Rao Nadkarni	Central Studios	S. V. Venkatraman	C. Honnappa Bhagavathar, U. R. Jeevarathinam, N. C. Vasanthakokilam, T. R. Rajakumari, T. S. Balaiah, D. Balasubramaniam, Kali N. Rathnam, C. T. Rajakantham	13-04-1946
Vidyapathi	A. T. Krishnaswamy	M. Somasundaram & S. K. Mohideen, Jupiter Pictures	A. Rama Rao	T. R. Ramachandran, K. Thavamani Devi, Trichur Premavathi, M. N. Nambiar, D. Balasubramaniam, M. R. Swaminathan, T. N. Sivathanu, M. S. S. Bhagyam, T. G. Kamala Devi, C. K. Saraswathi, K. Malathi, M. M. Radha Bai	
Vijayalakshmi	P. Pullaiah	Star Combines-Prakathi Pictures	G. Govindarajulu Naidu	B. R. Banthulu, M. V. Rajamma, T. R. Ramachandran, S. V. Subbaiah, M. J. Andal, Gowthamini	08-11-1946
Vikatayogi	K. Subramanyam	K. Subramanyam, Madras United Artists Corporation	Mothibabu, Brother Lakshmanan & Radha Krishnan	P. U. Chinnappa, T. R. Rajakumari, S. M. Kumaresan, B. S. Saroja, T. R. Ramachandran, T. S. Dhamayanthi	23-10-1946
