= S. D. Subbulakshmi =

Indian actress and singer

- Born: Srivaikundam Duraisamy Subbulakshmi
- Died: 1987
- Occupations: film actor, singer
- Years active: 1934–1964
- Spouse: K. Subramanyam

Srivaikundam Duraisamy Subbulakshmi was an Indian actress and singer who was active in Tamil cinema during the 1930s and 1940s. She was the wife of film director K. Subramanyam. She is credited with having introduced her family friend and singer M. S. Subbulakshmi to Tamil cinema and mentoring her in her early days.

== Early life ==
S. D. Subbulakshmi was born in Srivaikundam to Duraisamy and Janaki Ammal. Since childhood, S. D. Subbulakshmi had shown keen interest in stage dramas. The family moved to Madurai, where she learned Carnatic music and dance. Her parents took photos of her in various makeups and showed them to a number of drama companies. This helped her to start as a child actress in stage plays. She grew up acting in stage dramas and managed to act in a number of dramas with well-known artists such as M. K. Thyagaraja Bhagavathar, K. B. Sundarambal and T. R. Mahalingam and earned a very good name. Pavalakkodi was one such drama where she acted with M. K. Thiagaraja Bhagavather and became very famous.

== Cinema life ==
Letchumanan Chettiar or Lena Chettiar of Krishna Pictures, who had seen the drama wanted to picturise the drama and requested K. Subrahmanyam to direct that film. Lena Chettiar and K. Subrahmanyam watched the drama together. K. Subrahmanyam suggested engaging the cast of the drama to play the same roles in the film and Lena Chettiar agreed to the idea. Through Pavalakkodi, S. D. Subbulakshmi entered Tamil Cinema in 1934. She became a famous heroine in the 1930s till mid-1940s, then she switched to mother and supporting roles.

== Introducing M. S. Subbulakshmi ==
S. D. Subbulakshmi became instrumental in introducing M. S. Subbulakshmi when she persuaded K. Subrahmanyam to give the daughter of her friend Madurai Shanmugavadivu, a chance on the concert stage at the exhibition he was organising in connection with the 1932 Mahamagam Festival in Kumbakonam. Thus, it was also K. Subrahmanyam who first helped to make M. S. Subbulakshmi a star in the world of song. It was on that stage that M. S. Subbulakshmi became a star.

Later, when he negotiated with Sadasivam for the film rights for a story serialised in Ananda Vikatan, starring M. S. Subbulakshmi in the film, she came almost as part of the package. Thus started M. S. Subbulakshmi's film career in Sevasadanam with S. D. Subbulakshmi guiding throughout.

== Family life ==
S. D. Subbulakshmi married the lawyer turned director K. Subramanyam with the consent of his first wife Meenatchi. K. Subramanyam kept both families together and managed them without any discrimination between them. She had a son named Abaswaram Ramji.

== Filmography ==
Year	Film	Role	Notes
1934	Pavalakkodi	Princess Pavalakkodi	
1935	Naveena Sadaram	Sadharam	
1936	Usha Kalyanam	Usha	
1936	Kuchela	Lord Krishna and Suseela	
1936	Naveena Sarangadhara	Chitrangi	
1937	Mr. Ammanchi		
1939	Thyaga Bhoomi	Savithri	
1942	Ananthasayanam	Mohini	
1943	Krishna Sudhaama		Kannada
1945	Maanasamrakshanam		
1946	Vikatayogi		
1952	Andhaman Kaidhi	Kamatchi	
1952	Panam		
1954	Thookku Thookki		
1954	Thuli Visham		
1955	Gulebakavali		
1956	Mathar Kula Manickam		
1957	Raja Rajan	Queen Senbagavalli	
1957	Rani Lalithangi	Empress Angaiyarkanni	
1958	Sampoorna Ramayanam	Kausalya	
1959	Aana Valarthiya Vanampadi	Thankamani	Malayalam
1959	Yaanai Valartha Vaanampaadi	Thangamani	
1959	Kalyana Parisu	Vasanthi and Geetha's mother	
1960	Kadavulin Kuzhandhai		
1960	Sivagami		
1962	Pattinathar	Meenatchi	
1964	Pattanathil Bhootham	Latha's mother	
1966	Sadhu Mirandal	Parvarthy	Tamil; Special Appearance
1970	Engirundho Vandhaal	Radha / Kamala's mother	
