= Kaalam Maari Pochu =

Kaalam Maari Pochu (lit. 'Times have changed' in Tamil) may refer to these Indian films:

- Kaalam Maari Pochu (1956 film), the 1956 film
- Kaalam Maari Pochu (1996 film), the 1996 film
