= Krishnan Thoothu =

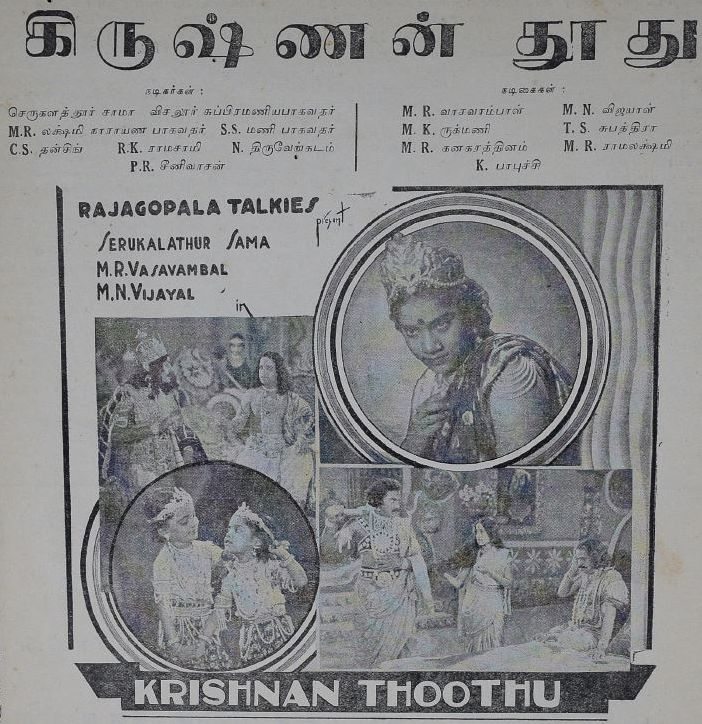
- Directed by: R. Prakash
- Screenplay by: Nagainallur Lakshminarayana Bhagavathar
- Story by: Nagainallur Lakshminarayana Bhagavathar
- Produced by: S. M. Letchumanan Chettiyar
- Cinematography: Kamal Ghosh
- Production companies: Motion Picture Productions; Combine Ltd.
- Distributed by: Rajagopal Talkies
- Release date: 27 April 1940 (India)
- Language: Tamil

Krishnan Thoothu also known as Sri Krishnan Thoothu was a 1940 Tamil-language film directed by R. Prakashm and produced by S. M. Letchumanan Chettiyar and Rajagopal Talkies. It was known for being the debut Tamil film of Telugu actress P. Kannamba.
A short comedy film titled Kozhukattai Kuppu was also screened along with the main film.

== Plot ==
The film is based on the traditional epic narrative of Krishna undertaking the mission of getting justice for the Pandavas from the Kaurava King Duryodhana. Serukulathur Sama played the main role of Krishna. The debut actress P. Kannamba played the heroine role. Both N. S. Krishnan and T. A. Mathuram contributed to the short film with their comedies.

== Cast ==
Cast adapted from the database of Film News Anandan and the film's songbook

Male Cast

- Serukulathur Sama as Krishnan
- Visalur Subramania Bhagavathar as Duryodhanan
- Nagainallur Lakshminarayana Bhagavathar as Vidhurar
- Sandow Natesa Pillai as Karnan
- D. Bala Subramanyam as Balaramar
- S. S. Mani Bhagavathar as Dharmar
- Battling. C. S. Dhan Singh as Bhiman
- R. S. Ramaswami Iyengar as Arjunan
- K. V. Krishnan as Nagulan
- Kothamangalam Ramasami as Sahadevan
- M. R. Durairaj as Sadhaki
- M. A. Ganapathi Bhat as Aswathama
- M. S. Velayutham as Devendran

Male cast (continued)

- T. Gopal Rao as Viradarajan
- L. Narayana Somayajalu as Sanjayar
- C. Chinaiah as Dhritharashtran
- K. S. A. Sami as Bhishmar
- M. Thiruvenkatam as Dushasanan
- K. Devanarayanan as Vikarnan
- T. M. Babu as Durvasar
- P. G. Venkatesan as Naradar
- N. S. Krishnan! (Kozhukattai Kuppu)
- Comedian Jolly Kittu Iyer as Sakuni
- Comedian E. Krishnamoorthi as Kandhan
- Comedian Kunchithapadam Pillai as Rangan

Female cast

- Gruhalakshmi Star P. Kannamba as Draupadi
- M. R. Vasuvambal as Kunti Devi
- M. N. Vijayal as Sathyabhama
- T. S. Krishnaveni as Rukmani
- T. A. Mathuram! (Kozhukattai Kuppu)
- M. K. Babuji as Young Kunti
- Dhanabhagyam, Janaki Bai as Dancers
- Baby Ranga & Sulochana as Baby Dancers

Female support cast

- M. R. Kanakarathnam, M. R. Ramalakshmi, Pushpammal, Rajeevi, Pattu, Sulochana, Lakshmikantham, Shankari, Padmavathi.

== Songs ==
No music director was credited, but the lyrics were written by Papanasam Sivan and Rajagopala Iyer. The songs were recorded by Jyotish Sinha.

== Box office ==
The film though well directed by R. Prakash, the drawback was with the debut heroine P. Kannamba's poor Tamil accent. She didn't know Tamil and spoke it with a Telugu slang, which didn't go well with the Tamil audiences.
