= Geetha Gandhi =

- Theatrical release poster
- Directed by: K. Subramanyam; M. R. S. Mani
- Screenplay by: K. Subramanyam
- Story by: K. Subramanyam
- Produced by: L. Krishnan
- Starring: P. A. Periyanayaki; B. S. Saroja; Baby Padma; T. R. Ramachandran; Lalitha-Padmini; V. Kumar
- Cinematography: P. L. Rai
- Edited by: M. R. S. Mani
- Music by: Pandurangan; Brother Lakshmanan
- Production company: Madras United Artistes Corporation
- Release date: 16 March 1949 (India)
- Running time: 208 minutes (19500 ft.)
- Country: India
- Language: Tamil

Geetha Gandhi (transl. Bhagavad Gita and Gandhi) is a 1949 Indian, Tamil-language film produced and directed by K. Subramanyam. The film stars T. R. Ramachandran and B. S. Saroja.

== Plot ==
Subbaiyer is an old man whose granddaughter, Girija is studying in Annamalai University. She comes home by train. At Egmore railway station, an unknown woman gives her an infant child, asking the girl to hold it for a moment. While Girija is doing so, the woman commits suicide by jumping in front of a train. Shocked by this, Girija goes to the police, but they taunt her. She goes home with the baby and is mistreated in the same way. In the meantime, two men travel in a train. One is Dr. Chander and the other is Gopu, who takes revenge on Dr. Chander for insulting him. Gopu takes the identity of Chander and sends him to a mental asylum. Gopu "invents" a medicine (Andev Pazhani) and becomes rich. Gopu's sister Sarada, who is a nurse, falls in love with him (in parallel). Girija is sent to the mental asylum for drowning the abandoned baby at the beach. Subbaiyer is saddened by the turn of events and takes it upon himself to bring back happiness in the family. What he does, forms the rest of the story.

== Cast ==
The list is compiled from the database of Film News Anandan and from the review article in the Hindu newspaper and the song book

Male Cast

- T. R. Ramachandran as Subbaiyer
- M. R. S. Mani as Doctor Chander
- V. Kumar as Gopu
- K. Viswanathan
- Pandit Bholonath Sharma
- Vinayaka Mudaliar

Female Cast

- P. A. Periyanayaki as Sarada
- B. S. Saroja as Girija
- Baby Padma as Baby Padma
- R. Padma as Kamakshi
- Lakshmiprabha
- K. S. Angamuthu as Angurbala

Dance

- Lalitha-Padmini

== Production ==
Krishnaswami Subrahmanyam produced the film under his own banner Madras United Artistes Corporation. As a follower of Mahatma Gandhi, Subrahmanyam made films like Sevasadanam, Thyagabhoomi and Balayogini with social themes relevant to Gandhian principles. This is another on the same lines.

Subrahmanyam's daughter, who was known as Baby Padma featured in this film as a child artiste. There was a dance sequence by Lalitha and Padmini, a dance drama. B. S. Saroja and Pandit Bholonath Sharma performed a fine dance as well. Choreography was handled by Pandit Bholonath Sharma, Katak, and Muthusami. Makeup was done by Haribabu, Somu and Gopal.

== Soundtrack ==
Music was composed by Pandurangan and Brother Lakshmanan while the lyrics were penned by Meenakshi Subrahmaniam. The songs were recorded by T. R. Ramachandran and R. Ramachandran. Padma sang two songs in the film. One song was in praise of Mahatma Gandhi and the other was about her ambition in life. There was a line in the lyrics that said she will become a dancer and stage her dance in America. It is significant because in later years she became a world renowned Bharatanatyam dancer.

Song	Singer	Length(m:ss)
"Manamohana Das Gandhi"	P. A. Periyanayaki	02:39
"Sonnarodi Gandhi Mahatma"		
"Enakku Vayasu Enna Theriyuma"	Baby Padma	
"Karuvizhi Edhaiyum Paaraadhu"		
"Aandev Pazhani"	P. A. Periyanayaki	
"Kandu Malar Ennai"	P. A. Periyanayaki	
"Parinile Seerongum Nadu Nam India"	K. S. Angamuthu	
"Jagame Mayakkam En"	K. S. Angamuthu	
"Gandhi Thatha"	Baby Padma	
"Aaduvom Geetham Paduvom"	K. S. Angamuthu	
"Mannan Chandran"	P. A. Periyanayaki	
"Unnaiyallal Gathi Edhu"	P. A. Periyanayaki	
"Kannan Geethopadesam Seidha"	P. A. Periyanayaki	
"Pudhu Juram Pudhu Juram Adhu"	Dance Music	
"Jeevathmakkal Ithayajothi"		
"Sathyamidho Sathyamidho Sathyamidho"		

== Reception ==
The film did not perform well at the box office.
