= Thyaga Bhoomi =

- Poster
- Directed by: K. Subramanyam
- Screenplay by: K. Subramanyam
- Story by: Kalki
- Based on: Thyaga Bhoomi by Kalki
- Produced by: Gopalkrishnan
- Starring: S. D. Subbulakshmi; Baby Saroja; Papanasam Sivan
- Cinematography: Sailen Bose
- Edited by: R. Rajagopal
- Music by: Papanasam Sivan; Motibabu
- Production company: The Madras United Artists Corporation
- Distributed by: Gemini Pictures Circuit
- Release date: 20 May 1939
- Running time: 194 min
- Country: India
- Language: Tamil

Thyaga Bhoomi (transl. Land of Sacrifice) is a 1939 Indian Tamil-language film directed and produced by K. Subramanyam. Starring K. J. Mahadevan and S.D.Subbalakshmi, the film was produced at the height of India's freedom movement and glorified Mahatma Gandhi and his ideals in no mean terms. The story for the film was based on a novel written by Kalki Krishnamurthy and was financed and distributed by S. S. Vasan before he created Gemini Studios. Thyagabhoomi became the only Indian film to be banned after release by the British government. The film's only existing print is now at an archive store in Pune. The story was serialized in Ananda Vikatan (Kalki was with the magazine at the time and Vasan was the financier-distributor of the film) simultaneously when the film production was going on with stills from the film being published. This was the first time ever something like this had ever been attempted in the world and garnered great success both in India and among other Tamil populations across the world (Malaysia, Singapore, Sri Lanka, Burma, etc.) and the British Empire.

== Plot ==
A still from the film

Sambu Sastrigal is a compassionate landlord who belongs to a conservative Brahmin community in the village Nedungarai. His only daughter Savitri is married to Sridharan, who works in Calcutta. Savitri leads a life of devotion and piety while Sridharan is fashionable, has his own secret inclinations of leading a licentious life and whiles away his time with his Anglo-Indian girlfriend Susie in Calcutta.

In his anxiety to ensure that his daughter starts her marital life, Sambu sells his properties and pays a huge dowry to Sridharan's father for taking Savitri into their household. Savitri starts living at Calcutta. Time passes and she becomes pregnant. But Savitri's life becomes sorrowful with a disgruntled mother-in-law and an indifferent husband. She writes letters to her father seeking help, which are intercepted by her stepmother and hence she receives no help.

Sambu Sastri shelters Harijans in his home when they are rendered homeless by a cyclone, thus inviting social ostracism from the community. The orthodox Hindu society gets agitated and excommunicates him. Having lost everything, Sambu Sastri goes to Madras hoping to find employment as a music teacher. But he fails in his efforts. Savitri, who was thrown out of her husband's house, returns to her village and learns that her father has left for Madras. She goes in search of him. In the meantime she gives birth to a girl child. She finds her father but he was in a state of trance. As she doesn't want to be a burden to him, she leaves the child with him and goes away.

Sambu wakes up and hears the cries of the child. When he does not find anyone around and nobody claims the child, he decides to bring her up himself in his own way and goes to Nallan, his erstwhile servant, who has settled down in Chavadikuppam, a suburb of Madras. With the presence of Sambu and the child, Chavadikuppam becomes an important colony. Sambu devotes all his time and energy for the upliftment of his poor neighbours and embarks on Gandhian social upliftment programmes, including picketing of liquor shops.

Sambu brings up Charu who grows to be a girl with many talents, more specifically dance. She is very popular among her schoolmates, but is always in the bad books of the headmistress. In the meanwhile, Uma Rani, a rich woman from Bombay, donates ₹500,000 for the development of Madras and is felicitated for the gesture. Uma Rani is none other than Savitri, who has inherited the wealth of her aunt who died in Bombay She tries to trace her father and child and lives in Madras incognito as Uma Rani.

Charu has a pet dog, which accompanies her to the school. The headmistress throws the dog out and it gets fatally injured. Charu takes it to the hospital and the matron of the hospital does not attend to it immediately. Uma Rani arrives there and Charu seeks her help to get the dog treated. The very sight of Charu strikes a chord in Uma Rani's heart; she immediately orders the matron to treat the dog. When the dog dies, Charu blames the doctor and runs away.

Uma Rani regrets not having taken Charu's details. She immediately instructs her lawyer to trace the child and finally finds her and Sambu. Without revealing her true identity, Uma Rani pays frequent visits to Chavadikuppam to meet her child and father. Sambu Sastri is elated that the distinguished lady Uma Rani visits them. He thinks God has blessed them in disguise. He permits Charu to go and reside with Uma Rani, but Charu's heart longs for Sambu Sastri. One night, she quietly slips back to Chavadikuppam. Sambu Sastri, who has resolved to spend the rest of his life for the upliftment of the poor and the masses, takes Charu with him when he visits villages.

Thinking that Sambu Sastri and Charu have disappeared, Uma Rani meets the Police Deputy Commissioner for help and is surprised to find Sridharan arrested by the police for forgeries he committed in Calcutta. Out of pity Uma Rani arranges his bail and he is released. Learning that Uma Rani is none other than his wife Savitri, Sridharan immediately goes to her and expresses that he wants to live with her again. However, Uma Rani is determined to spend the rest of her life serving people and the country. She turns down his proposal: he swears revenge and institutes proceedings for Restitution of Conjugal Rights. Court proceedings follow. Uma Rani, Sambu Sastri and Charu all play their own parts. Uma Rani refuses to live with him and even offers him alimony to get relieved from the relationship. Finally, Sridharan wins the case, but is unable to change Uma Rani's will as she has decided to dedicate her life for a cause. She wears khadi outfits, joins the Freedom Movement with her father and gets arrested with other freedom fighters.

Sridharan repents and decides to join the campaign for the upliftment of the country as retribution. Practically at the same time, Sridharan and Uma Rani court imprisonment for the noble cause. A new light dawns upon them. They feel that they are no longer man and wife, but children of the soil. Sambu Sastri feels out of place at Uma Rani's home and realises that his place in life is more in Chavadikuppam and its environments. He returns to Chavadikuppam with Charu.

== Cast ==
Credits adapted from the film's songbook and the opening credits of the film:

Male cast

- Papanasam Sivan as Sambu Sastri
- K. J. Mahadevan B.A. as Sridharan
- Jolly Kittu Iyer as Rajarama Iyer
- P. R. Rajagopala Iyer as Nallan
- Salem Sundara Sastri as Dikshithar
- S. Ramachandra Iyer as Mayor
- Clown Sambhu as Deaf Vaidhi
- Thanjavur Mani Iyer as Lawyer
- W. S. Srinivasan as Lawyer
- T. V. Neelakantan B.A., B.L. as Police Deputy Commissioner
- S. A. Iyer (Ceylon) as Judge
- M. R. S. Mani as Police Inspector
- C. V. R. Chandran as Gardener

Female cast

- S. D. Subbulakshmi as Savitri
- Baby Saroja as Charu
- K. S. Lalitha as Radha
- K. N. Kamalam as Mangalam
- Meenakshi Ammal as Thangammmal
- D. Chellammal as Swarnammal
- Leela Bai as Matron
- R. S. Rajalakshmi as Head Mistress
- K. N. Rajam as Teacher
- Miss B. Haal as Susie

Supporting cast

- Baby Ramanu
- Baby Thambichella
- Balu
- Baby Radha
- Balakrishnan
- S. S. Mani Bhagavathar
- Thiruvenkatatha Iyengar
- Lakshmanan
- Ramasami Iyengar
- Ramamoorthi
- Gopal Rao

== Production ==
In 1937, the pro-independence Indian National Congress defeated the pro-British Justice Party for the first time in the elections to the Madras Legislative Assembly and Chakravarthi Rajagopalachari was sworn in as the Chief Minister. As an immediate consequence of this change of guard, censorship was relaxed on films glorifying the freedom movement and national leaders. Encouraged by the new government's policies, a few films glorifying the freedom movement were made during this period. Thyagabhoomi was one of them.

However, censorship was reimposed when the Congress Government resigned on the eve of India's entry into the Second World War. The Governor of Madras who took over the administration of the province subsequently banned Thyagabhoomi. The ban evoked severe protests from Indian film-viewers. However, by the time the ban was enforced, Thyagabhoomi was already a success — it was being screened at packed theaters in and around Madras. British Government policy was to either completely prohibit films with "potentially seditious" or subject them to strict censorship. Thyagabhoomi was the first film released in Madras to be banned. As the British Government believed that Thyagabhoomi supported the Congress Party due to the visuals of congress cap wearing people in scenes as well as a sing rendered by D.K. Pattammal "Desiya Sevai Seyya Vareer", it was banned as soon as the Governor took over the administration in 1940 when the film had already been running full for 22 weeks. Unfazed by the declaration K Subrahmanyam and S.S. Vasan announced that shows would run for free continuously in Gaitey theatre until the ban declaration was served to it. This brought in a huge rush of viewers and finally the ban became enforced after a lathi charge took place inside the theatre.

== Music ==
The music was composed by Papanasam Sivan, Motibabu, and Kalki. The lyrics were written by Papanasam Sivan and Rajagopala Iyer. The singers were Baby Saroja, S. D. Subbulakshmi, Papanasam Sivan, and Vatsala. The only playback singer of the film was D. K. Pattammal. Bharatanatyam was unknown in films at that time. Papanasam Sivan penned the Tamil version of "Krishna Née Begane Baro" and tuned it. Baby Saroja learnt Bharatha Natyam from Mylapore Gowri Ammal, the last Devadasi of Mylapore Kapaleeswarar temple. Her mother Vatsala (Alamelu Viswanathan) sang the song to which Baby Saroja danced in the film. With the songs there was an orchestra too.

Orchestra

- Motibabu – Harmonium
- Parthasarthi Iyengar – Gottuvadhyam
- V. Govindasami Nayakar – Fiddle
- Alirasa – Sarangi
- Rangasami Iyer – Mridangam
- Simanlal – Tabla
- Vittal Rao – Dholak
- Srinivasa Iyengar – Jalatharangam
- L. Alan – Clarinet

=== Soundtrack ===
No	Song	Singer	Lyrics	Length
1	Bharatha Punyabhoomi ... Jayabharatha Punyabhoomi	D. K. Pattammal, Chorus	Papanasam Sivan	03:08
2	Sri Ramabhadra Sri Thajan Karunya Samudhra	Papanasam Sivan, Chorus	Papanasam Sivan	
3	Pattas Pattas Pareer Pareer ... Sabash Sabash Pareer Pareer	S. D. Subbulakshmi	Papanasam Sivan	
4	Thunburave Enai Padaitha	S. D. Subbulakshmi	Papanasam Sivan	
5	Piravi Thanile Suthinamithe	S. D. Subbulakshmi	Papanasam Sivan	
6	Sri Jaga Thambikaiye Dheena Dhayapari Shankari	Papanasam Sivan	Papanasam Sivan	
7	Navasithi Petralum Siva Bakthi Illatha	Papanasam Sivan	Papanasam Sivan	
8	Srugara Lahari	Papanasam Sivan	Papanasam Sivan	
9	Thedi Thedi Alaindhene	Papanasam Sivan	Papanasam Sivan	
10	Vaalum Manai Udal Aadai	Papanasam Sivan	Papanasam Sivan	
11	Krishna Nee Vegamaai Vaada	Vatsala	Papanasam Sivan	
12	Urave Purindhome Naam	Vatsala	Papanasam Sivan	
13	Jaya Jaya Jaya Devi	S. D. Subbulakshmi, Baby Saroja	Papanasam Sivan	
14	Saake Thaathipa Ramaa Rama Vibo	Clown Sambhu	Papanasam Sivan	
15	Desa Sevai Seya Vareer	D. K. Pattammal	Kalki	01:25
16	Chollu Gandhi Thathavukku Je Je Je	Baby Saroja	Kalki	
17	Bandha Magandru Namthirunadu Uynthida Vendamo	D. K. Pattammal	Kalki	

== Themes ==
The character of Sambu Sastri was modelled upon Mahatma Gandhi. The film also included real-life footage of Gandhi spinning the charkha.

Kalki Krishnamurthy was inspired by real life people and performers, Papanasam Sivan, S.D. Subbulakshmi and Baby Saroja to write a story that intertwined characters written for them set in the social milieu of reformation, the freedom movement and personal sacrifice.

== Other versions ==
In 1989, on the 50th anniversary of the film, a telefilm version was made by director K. Subramanyam's son, S. Krishnaswamy. The newer Hindi version of the film marked the anniversary of the ban on the original and served as a tribute to the memory of S. Krisnaswamy's father. The Hindi version features Bharat Bhushan in a lead role as father of the heroine protagonist (Sambu Sastri), while Gita plays the main role of Savitri. Charu is played in this version by Aparna Anantharaman. Several other well-known artistes are also featured.
