= Pavalakkodi =

Pavalakkodi may refer to:

- Pavalakkodi (1934 film), a Tamil language film
- Pavalakodi (1949 film), an Indian Tamil-language film
- Pavalakkodi (2003 film), a Tamil language drama film
