= Sathyaseelan =

1936 Indian Tamil-language film

Sathya Seelan
- சத்திய சீலன்
- Directed by: B. Sampath Kumar
- Screenplay by: L. Rajamanickam
- Story by: L. Rajamanickam
- Produced by: M. K. Thyagaraja Bhagavathar
- Starring: M. K. Thyagaraja Bhagavathar; M. S. Devasena; L. Narayana Rao
- Cinematography: Sailen Bose
- Music by: Janakai Kavikunjaram
- Production company: Thyagaraja Talkie Film Co.
- Release date: 1936
- Country: India
- Language: Tamil

Sathyaseelan (Tamil: சத்தியசீலன்) is a 1936 Tamil-language film directed by B. Sampathkumar and produced by M.K. Thyagaraja Bhagavathar, starring M. K. Thyagaraja Bhagavathar, M.S. Devasena, S.D. Subbulakshmi, S.S. Mani Bhagavathar. It was the first film that Thyagaraja Bhagavathar produced himself.

== Cast ==
Cast according to the song book

Male cast

- M. K. Thyagaraja Bhagavathar as Sathya Seelan
- M. Ramaswamy Iyer as King Vikrama Singam
- T. S. Somasundaram as Nithyanandar
- M. P. Mohan as Prathapuradhran
- L. Narayana Rao as Dharmadhan
- L. Rajamanickam as Vimalanathan
- P. S. Kasilingam as Chandamaruthan
- M. Muthuramalingam as Kunju
- K. R. Mani Iyer as Veerabhadran

Female cast

- M. S. Devasena as Premavathi
- G. Padmavathi Bai as Queen Vedavalli
- T. V. Kanthimathi Bai as Kuyili

== Production ==
Bhagavathar was producer of this film. The total cost of the film is Rs 52,000.

== Soundtrack ==
All tracks are written by Janakai Kavikunjaram

No.	Title	Singer(s)	Length
1.	"Sollu Pappa"	M. K. Thyagaraja Bhagavathar	3:25

== Bibliography ==
Dhananjayan, G. (2014). Pride of Tamil Cinema: 1931 to 2013. Blue Ocean Publishers.
