= Ananthasayanam (1942 film) =

1942 film by K. Subramanyam

- Theatrical release poster
- Directed by: Krishnaswami Subrahmanyam; C. S. V. Iyer
- Written by: Krishnaswami Subrahmanyam; S. A. Durai (dialogues)
- Screenplay by: Krishnaswami Subrahmanyam
- Produced by: Krishnaswami Subrahmanyam
- Starring: Krishnaswami Subrahmanyam; S. D. Subbulakshmi; M. V. Rajamma; G. Pattu Iyer; V. N. Janaki
- Cinematography: Kamal Ghosh
- Music by: V. S. Parthasarathy Iyengar
- Production company: Madras United Artistes Corporation
- Distributed by: Madras United Artistes Corporation
- Release date: 1942
- Country: India
- Language: Tamil

Ananthasayanam (Leaning posture with the head rested on one's hand) is a 1942 Tamil language film produced by and starring Krishnaswami Subrahmanyam in the lead role. Subrahmanyam co-directed the film with C. S. V. Iyer. The film also featured S. D. Subbulakshmi and M. V. Rajamma as the female leads with G. Pattu Iyer and V. N. Janaki playing supporting roles.

== Plot ==
Diwakarar (Subrahmanyam) is a devotee of Vishnu in the form of Anantha Padmanabhaswamy. He is forced by his family to marry his niece Sarasa (Janaki). Diwakarar is not interested in the alliance and wishes to pursue his devotion to God by denouncing married life. He walks out of his wedding ceremony to the shock of all who are present there and goes in search of salvation and enlightenment.

== Cast ==
Adapted from The Hindu and the film's song book

Male Cast

- K. Subramanyam B. A., B. S. as Diwakarar
- G. Pattu Iyer as Sheriff
- Vidwan Srinivasan as King
- M. R. S. Mani as Swedha Chandran
- P. R. Rajagopala Iyer as Kuravar
- C. N. Sadasivaiah as Kuravar
- Jolly Kittu Iyer a King's Priest
- R. S. Ramaswami Iyengar as Maha Vishnu
- S. Radhakrishnan as Chera Nation King

Support Cast

Clown Sambhu, Ramachandran, Kulathu Mani,
and Thanjavur Mani Iyer.

Female Cast

- S. D. Subbulakshmi as Mohini
- M. V. Rajamma as Susheela
- R. B. Lakshmi Devi as Mohini's mother
- V. N. Janaki as Sarasa
- K. Nagalakshmi as Diwakarar's mother
- T. S. Rajammal as Manjula
- Kumari Subbulakshmi as Young Krishnan

== Production ==
Ananthasayanam marked the acting debut of Krishnaswami Subrahmanyam, who also directed and produced the film under his own banner Madras United Artistes Corporation. The dialogues were written by both Subrahmanyam and S. A. Durai while Subrahmanyam himself handled the screenplay. The cinematography was done by Kamal Ghosh. Durai incorporated into the screenplay information and hymns on Anantha Padmanabhaswamy Palmyra leaf manuscripts that were preserved by the territory of Travancore.

C. V. Ramakrishnan worked as an assistant cinematographer to Ghosh. G. Pattu Iyer, while playing a supporting role in the film, was an assistant director to Subrahmanyam along with K. J. Mahadevan. Principal photography for the film was done at Gemini Studios.

== Soundtrack ==
V. S. Parthasarathy Iyengar composed the film's music and score while Papanasam Sivan and Rajagopal Iyer wrote the lyrics for the songs. According to film critic and historian Randor Guy, none of the songs became popular.

== Reception ==
Guy noted that the film was remembered for the "surprising on-screen appearance of the Indian film pioneer K. Subramanyam." Ananthasayanam did not do well at the box office.
