= Raja Rajan =

Raja Rajan may refer to:

- Raja Raja Chola I (died 1014), an emperor of the Tamil Chola Empire
- Raja Rajan (film), a 1957 Tamil language film
