= Naveena Sarangadhara =

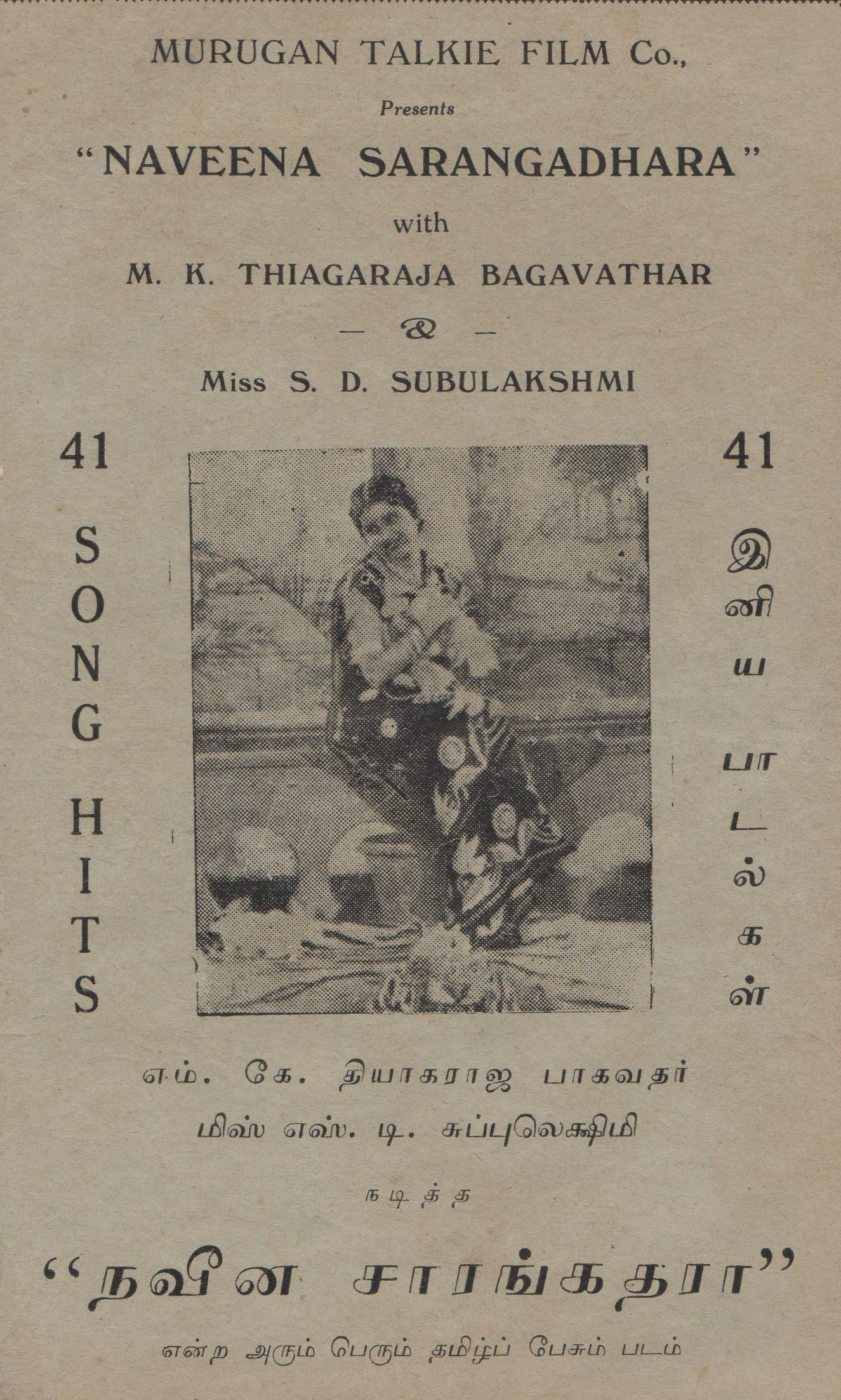
- நவீன சாரங்கதாரா
- Directed by: K. Subramaniam
- Screenplay by: K. Subramaniam
- Produced by: Murugan Talkies
- Starring: M. K. Thyagaraja Bhagavathar; S. D. Subbulakshmi; S. S. Mani Bhagavathar; G. Pattu Iyer; Indubala
- Music by: Papanasam Sivan
- Production company: Murugan Talkies
- Release date: 1936
- Country: India
- Language: Tamil

Naveena Sarangadhara (நவீன சாரங்கதாரா) is a 1936 Tamil film directed by K. Subramaniam under Murugan Talkies. Naveena in Tamil means modern. The film was titled thus in order to distinguish it from the earlier versions and also to highlight the slight modifications made to the original story. The cast includes M. K. Thyagaraja Bhagavathar and S. D. Subbulakshmi in the lead roles, supported by S. S. Mani Bhagavathar, G. Pattu Iyer and Indubala. The music was composed by Papanasam Sivan.

== Cast ==
- M. K. Thyagaraja Bhagavathar
- S. D. Subbulakshmi
- S. S. Mani Bhagavathar
- G. Pattu Iyer
- Indubala

== Production ==
The film has 41 songs. Most of the songs are sung by Thyagaraja Bhagavathar and Subbulakshmi.

== Soundtrack ==
All of the songs' lyrics were written and composed by Papanasam Sivan.

No	Title	Lyrics	Singer(S)
1	Poyi Varir Guruve	Papanasam Sivan	Thyagaraja Bhagavathar, Subbulakshmi.
2	Kanakkan Koosuthadi	Papanasam Sivan	Thyagaraja Bhagavathar, Subbulakshmi.
3	Vanavarkaḷum Thediye Dhinam	Papanasam Sivan	Thyagaraja Bhagavathar, Subbulakshmi.
4	Ethaṉai Aḻagu Paradi	Papanasam Sivan	Thyagaraja Bhagavathar, Subbulakshmi.
5	Miṉṉal Ezḻiludaiyaḷ Ivaḷ	Papanasam Sivan	Thyagaraja Bhagavathar, Subbulakshmi.
6	Innum Varadhaeṉo Ennuyirkkiniyan	Papanasam Sivan	Thyagaraja Bhagavathar, Subbulakshmi.
7	Enakke Tharamavai Yenthilaiye	Papanasam Sivan	Thyagaraja Bhagavathar, Subbulakshmi.
8	Enna Mosam Enadharan	Papanasam Sivan	Thyagaraja Bhagavathar, Subbulakshmi.
9	Rathi Sundari Kalyani	Papanasam Sivan	Thyagaraja Bhagavathar, Subbulakshmi.
10	Padathilulla Uruvam Adiyaal	Papanasam Sivan	Thyagaraja Bhagavathar, Subbulakshmi.
11	Perumpunai Sootiyathe Enathu Manam	Papanasam Sivan	Thyagaraja Bhagavathar, Subbulakshmi.
12	Aasaigundha Mannava Aathisundara Migunthavena	Papanasam Sivan	Thyagaraja Bhagavathar, Subbulakshmi.
13	Ariyiro Ammani Neerum	Papanasam Sivan	Thyagaraja Bhagavathar, Subbulakshmi.
14	Gnana Kumari Nadana Singari	Papanasam Sivan	Thyagaraja Bhagavathar, Subbulakshmi.
15	Koodithirikindra Jodippurakkal	Papanasam Sivan	Thyagaraja Bhagavathar, Subbulakshmi.
16	Podanna Poda Nee Pokkirithanama	Papanasam Sivan	Thyagaraja Bhagavathar, Subbulakshmi.
17	Madapayapola Thadithanama	Papanasam Sivan	Thyagaraja Bhagavathar, Subbulakshmi.
18	Megam Mandalam Thaandi Kannukkum Theriyamal	Papanasam Sivan	Thyagaraja Bhagavathar, Subbulakshmi.
19	Neelamugalinidiye Marainthu	Papanasam Sivan	Thyagaraja Bhagavathar, Subbulakshmi.

== Bibliography ==
- Dhananjayan, G.Dhananjayan, G. (2014). Pride of Tamil Cinema: 1931 to 2013. Blue Ocean Publishers.
