= Maanasamrakshanam =

Maanasamrakshanam (In Defense of Honor)
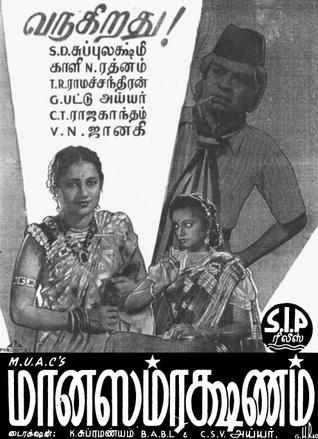
- Film Poster
- Directed by: K. Subramaniam, C. S. V. Iyer
- Story by: K. Subramaniam
- Produced by: K. Subramaniam
- Starring: S. D. Subbulakshmi; G. Pattu Iyer; V. N. Janaki; T. R. Ramachandran; Kali N. Rathnam and others
- Cinematography: Thambu
- Music by: K. C. Thyagarajan (Background score)
- Production company: Madras United Artistes Corporation
- Release date: 1945
- Country: India
- Language: Tamil

Maanasamrakshanam (In Defense of Honor) is a 1945 Indian Tamil language film, produced, directed and co-written by K. Subramaniam, with S. D. Subbulakshmi, G. Pattu Iyer, V. N. Janaki, T. R. Ramachandran and Kali N. Rathnam. The film is lost.

== Plot ==
During World War II, Japan invades Burma (now known as Myanmar) in 1941. Many Indians have adopted Burma as their country and are living there. The invasion brings many hardships to these Indians. They start migrating to India, walking hundreds of miles through jungles and mountains with the Japanese in pursuit. The heroine sets up an organisation called Maanasamrakshana in India to take care of the lost children. The heroine is involved in nationalistic activities and defeats the villain's anti-national activities. She faces her own relatives who misappropriate her wealth.

== Cast ==
S. D. Subbulakshmi
G. Pattu Iyer
V. N. Janaki
T. R. Ramachandran
Kali N. Rathnam
T. K. Sampangi
M. R. S. Mani
T. R. B. Rao
M. A. Ganapathi Bhat
V. S. Santhanam Ayyangar
Ramanuja Chariar
V. A. S. Mani
Master Sathasivam
Nagalakshmi
Kumari Subbulakshmi

== Crew ==
- Producer: K. Subramaniam
- Directors: K. Subramaniam, C. S. V. Iyer
- Cinematography: Thambu (a cousin of K. Subramaniam)
- Art Direction: F. Nagoor, Ghodgaonkar
- Music (Background Score): K. C. Thyagarajan
- Lyrics: Papanasam Rajagopala Iyer (Papanasam Sivan's brother)
