= Kuchela (film) =

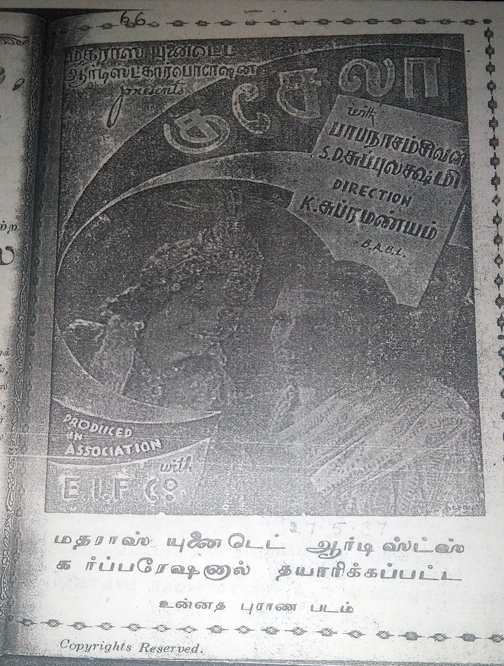
- Poster
- Directed by: K. Subramaniam
- Produced by: Krishnaswamy
- Starring: Papanasam Sivan; S. D. Subbulakshmi
- Release date: 10 April 1936
- Country: India
- Language: Tamil

Kuchela (transl. Devotee Kuchela) is a 1936 Indian Tamil-language devotional film directed and produced by lawyer-turned-filmmaker K. Subramaniam. The film featured Papanasam Sivan as Kuchela and S. D. Subbulakshmi in dual roles as Krishna and Kuchela's wife Susheela.

== Plot ==
The film depicted the tale of friendship between the poor Brahmin Kuchela who had 27 children and Krishna, a major Hinduism god.

== Cast ==
The following list was adapted from The Hindu review article by Randor Guy and from the film's song book.

Male cast

- Papanasam Sivan as Kuchela
- Vidwan Shankaralingam as Balaraman
- S. S. Mani Bhagavathar as Saandheepa Muni
- Jolly Kittu as Dwarapaalakar
- G. Pattu Iyer as Samba Moorthi
- Kunjithapatham Pillai as Vevukaar
- Salem Sundaram as Rich Mirasudar

Female cast

- S. D. Subbulakshmi as Lord Krishna and Suseelai
- K. K. Parvathi as Rukmini
- Poornima as Sathyabhama
- Bala Saraswathi as Young Krishnan
- Neelambal as Young Kuchela

== Production ==
Subramanyam cast Subbulakshmi in a double role as a male (Lord Krishna) and a female (Susheela, Kuchela's wife). Such casting was the first of its kind in Tamil film history and even Indian cinema. Cinematography was handled by Sailen Bose and the continuity (Editing) was supervised by G. Pattu Iyer.

=== Title ===
The Encyclopedia of Indian cinema and The Hindu review article gives the title of the film as Bhaktha Kuchela. Whereas, Film News Anandan's database and the Song Book gives the title as Kuchela.

== Soundtrack ==
The music was composed by Papanasam Sivan who also penned the lyrics. There were more than 30 songs in the film. The song book gave the details of orchestra.

- Parthasarathy Naidu – Harmonium
- Rajam Iyer – Fiddle (Violin)
- Ekambara Achari – Mridangam

== Reception ==
Writing in 2010, Randor Guy said the film was a success. He said the film is "Remembered for the innovative casting, pleasing music and Subbulakshmi's performance."
