= Sivagami =

- Theatrical release poster
- Directed by: Antony Mitradas
- Written by: A. K. Venkata Ramanujam
- Produced by: M. A. Venu
- Starring: M. K. Thyagaraja Bhagavathar; G. Varalakshmi
- Cinematography: K. Ramachandran
- Edited by: V. Rajagopal
- Music by: K. V. Mahadevan
- Production company: Muthaiah Pictures
- Release date: 9 February 1960
- Running time: 156 minutes
- Country: India
- Language: Tamil

Sivagami (/sɪvəɡɑːmi/) is a 1960 Indian Tamil-language drama film produced by Muthiah Pictures and directed by Antony Mitradas. It featured M. K. Thyagaraja Bhagavathar in his final film appearance alongside G. Varalakshmi playing the titular character. The film is a posthumous release for Bhagavathar.

== Cast ==
- M. K. Thyagaraja Bhagavathar as Thyagaraja Bhagavathar (Himself)
- G. Varalakshmi as Sivagami / Thyagaraja Bhagavathar's wife
- S. D. Subbulakshmi as Muthu's mother
- Jaggayya as Muthu / Thyagaraja Bhagavathar's step son
- T. P. Muthulakshmi as Thangam
- K. K. Soundar as Thangappan / Muthu's uncle
- S. Rama Rao as Annasamy / Muthu's friend
- Sivasooriyan as Muthu's uncle
- Jayashree as Vasantha
- Lakshmi Prabha
- Natarajan

== Production ==
The film was produced by M. A. Venu under the banner Muthiah Pictures. By 1959, M. K. Thyagaraja Bhagavathar requested M. A. Venu to produce a film. M. A. Venu agreed and started producing this film. However, Bhagavathar died while the production was half way. So, the crew adapted the story and completed the film. Bhagavathar could not sing at this time. He told the producer that he has some songs recorded earlier for another film Rajayogi that was never produced and told the producer to use those songs. Bhagavathar wore sunglasses in many scenes due to his then fading eyesight.

== Soundtrack ==
The soundtrack album was composed by K. V. Mahadevan.

Track listing
No.	Title	Lyrics	Singer(s)	Length
1.	"Arbutha Leelaigalai"	Papanasam Sivan	M. K. Thyagaraja Bhagavathar	3:03
2.	"Gnana Sabayil"	Papanasam Sivan	M. K. Thyagaraja Bhagavathar	2:50
3.	"Ananda Natana"	Papanasam Sivan	M. K. Thyagaraja Bhagavathar	2:37
4.	"Thillaiyil Nayaganae"	Papanasam Sivan	M. K. Thyagaraja Bhagavathar	2:58
5.	"Vaanil Muzhu"	Ka. Mu. Sheriff	T. M. Soundararajan	3:40
6.	"Angum Ingum Aaattam Poda"	Ka. Mu. Sheriff	T. M. Soundararajan, Soolamangalam Rajalakshmi	3:33
7.	"Sinnakutti Nadaiya Paarthaa"	Ka. Mu. Sheriff	K. Jamuna Rani, M. S. Rajeswari	2:36
8.	"Kottum Sootrtum Maatikkittu"	Ka. Mu. Sheriff	S. C. Krishnan, A. G. Rathnamala	3:35
Total length:				24:52
