= Madurai Veeran (1956 film) =

1956 film by D. Yoganand

- Theatrical release poster
- Directed by: D. Yoganand
- Screenplay by: Kannadasan
- Produced by: Lena Chettiar
- Starring: M. G. Ramachandran; P. Bhanumathi; Padmini
- Cinematography: M. A. Rehman
- Edited by: V. B. Natarajan
- Music by: G. Ramanathan
- Production company: Krishna Pictures
- Release date: 13 April 1956
- Running time: 165 minutes
- Country: India
- Language: Tamil
- Box office: ₹1 crore

Madurai Veeran (transl. The Warrior of Madurai) is a 1956 Indian Tamil-language historical action film directed by D. Yoganand, written by Kannadasan, and produced by Lena Chettiar. Based on the folklore legend turned deity of the same name, it stars M. G. Ramachandran as the eponymous character, with P. Bhanumathi and Padmini playing his love interests. T. S. Balaiah, N. S. Krishnan and T. A. Mathuram play supporting roles.

Madurai Veeran was the second film based on the legend after a 1939 film. It was released on 13 April 1956, during Puthandu (Tamil New Year). The film became a major success, and had a theatrical run of over 200 days, thereby becoming a silver jubilee film. It was also a milestone in the careers of Ramachandran and Padmini, and led to many more similar films being made.

== Plot ==
A baby is born to the chieftain of Varanavasi, but with an unlucky mark destined to bring doom to the state. Acting as per the dictates of the astrologer, the baby is abandoned in the forest. A cobbler and his wife discover the baby in the forest, and bring him up as their son. They name him Veeran, meaning warrior, because he did not cry even though he was around forest animals.

Veeran grows up to be a brave and noble youth. He chances to save Bommi, the princess of Thottiyam from being drowned in the Cauvery. Bommi falls in love with him. Though Veeran doesn't reciprocate initially, he perceives the depth of her love gradually after Bommi comes riding on an elephant dressed as a man and saves Veeran from being trampled to death. Bommi's uncle, the cowardly Narasappan finds his schemes of marrying Bommi falling apart. Citing Veeran's low birth, Narasappan causes the lovers undue hardships. Due to opposition from Bommi's father, Veeran arrives and carries the princess away. Finally the King of Tiruchi, from whom Narasappan had sought assistance, declares that Veeran and Bommi are not guilty of any crime and sanctifies their union in wedlock. And being impressed with Veeran's valour, the King appoints him as the commander of the army.

Thirumalai Nayakar of Madurai appeals to Tiruchi to help curb the menace of a gang of robbers that was terrorising the people of Madurai. Veeran is sent to Madurai and he is appointed Nayakar's commander. There he sees Vellaiyamma, the beautiful court dancer and is impressed with her virtues and skills. Suitable disguised, Veeran and Vellaiyamma gain entry into the Azhagar Malai den of the thieves. With the help of hidden soldiers, they manage to capture most of the robbers and recover the plundered loot.

Nayakar, who wants to make Vellaiyamma his concubine, is furious when he hears that Vellaiyamma is in love with Veeran. And his mind further poisoned by the evil Narasappan and his former commander Kutilan, the King accuses Veeran of treason and orders a hand and leg of Veeran to be severed. Before the sentence is carried out Veeran recognises in the crowd the leader of the thieves Sangilikaruppan, and puts him to death in a quick encounter. Satisfied that he has now accomplished his mission, Veeran subjects himself to the mutilation. And as his soul leaves his body soon after, Bommi and Vellaiyamma unite with him in the heavenly abode.

== Cast ==
Male cast

- M. G. Ramachandran as Veeran
- T. S. Balaiah as Narasappan
- N. S. Krishnan as Veeran's foster father
- P. S. Venkatachalam as Saint
- Kuladeivam Rajagopal
- Kallapart Natarajan
- O. A. K. Thevar as Thirumalai Nayakar
- Ma. Balasubramaniam as King Bomman
- Tirupathisamy as Chokkan

Female cast

- P. Bhanumathi as Bommi
- Padmini as Vellaiyamma
- T. A. Mathuram as Veeran's foster mother
- E. V. Saroja as Killi

Dance

- Lalitha
- Ragini
- Kusalakumari
- Maadi Lakshmi

== Production ==
The folklore legend turned deity Madurai Veeran's first appearance on screen was in a 1939 film with the same name. Another attempt to make a film based on the legend was made in the late 1940s by Naveena Pictures, with P. U. Chinnappa set to star; this did not materialise. Lena Chettiar of Krishna Pictures later successfully managed to produce one, also titled Madurai Veeran, with D. Yoganand as director. However, Chettiar was not credited as producer. The screenplay for this version was written by Kannadasan, who also served as lyricist. Art direction was handled by Ganga, editing by V. B. Natarajan, and the cinematography by M. A. Rehman.

M. G. Ramachandran, who starred as the title character, initially refused to act in the film because it had mythological references, but joined after being urged by R. M. Veerappan. He felt that the character of Velliaiyamma was "poorly depicted" in the original legend, and suggested changes to her screen depiction, to which the producer assented. The character was portrayed by Padmini, in her first film opposite Ramachandran. The final cut of the film was 165 minutes.

== Themes and influences ==
Tamil historian Sachi Sri Kantha noted that various Ramachandran films reflect the 1950s trend of films being "costume dramas" that focus on princes and folk heroes, citing Madurai Veeran as an example. Ashish Rajadhyaksha and Paul Willemen, in Encyclopedia of Indian Cinema, compare it to Ramachandran's earlier films like Malaikkallan (1954) and Alibabavum 40 Thirudargalum (1956) as they are also Robin Hood-inspired, and because P. Bhanumathi plays a damsel in distress in them.

== Soundtrack ==
The music was composed by G. Ramanathan. The song "Summa Kidantha Sothukku Kashtam" is based on "Yeruvaaka Saagaaro Ranno Chinnanna", composed by Master Venu for the Telugu film Rojulu Marayi (1955). A. V. Meiyappan, distributor of Rojulu Marayi's Tamil remake Kaalam Maari Pochu (1956), which re-used "Yeruvaaka Saagaaro Ranno Chinnanna" as "Kallam Kabadam Theriyadhavane" (also known as "Yerupooti Povaye Anne Sinnanne"), sued Lena Chettiar, accusing him of stealing the tune of his film song. V. L. Ethiraj, a renowned lawyer, appeared for Chettiar. The judge observed that the tune of both songs were based on folklore music, and no-one could claim a right of ownership to such music. The case was dismissed. The song "Aadal Kaaneero" is set in the Carnatic raga known as Charukesi, and attained popularity. A remix of "Vaanga Machan Vaanga" was recorded by Hiphop Tamizha for the 2019 film Vantha Rajavathaan Varuven.

No.	Title	Lyrics	Singer(s)	Length
1.	"Senthamizha"	Kannadasan	M. L. Vasanthakumari	2:56
2.	"Nadagamellam"	Kannadasan	T. M. Soundararajan, Jikki	3:44
3.	"Avarkkum Enakkum"	Kannadasan	P. Bhanumathi	2:49
4.	"Kadamaiyile"	Kannadasan	T. M. Soundararajan	5:16
5.	"Aadal Kaaneero"	Udumalai Narayana Kavi	M. L. Vasanthakumari	5:53
6.	"Summa Kidantha"	Pattukkottai Kalyanasundaram	P. Leela, Jikki	4:10
7.	"Kundruthor Adi Varum"	Udumalai Narayana Kavi	P. Leela	4:18
8.	"Vaanga Machan Vaanga" (Duet)	Thanjai N. Ramaiah Dass	T. M. Soundararajan, P. Leela	3:00
9.	"Vaanga Machan Vaanga" (Solo)	Thanjai N. Ramaiah Dass	P. Leela	3:01
10.	"Echu Pizhaikkum"	Thanjai N. Ramaiah Dass	T. M. Soundararajan, Jikki	3:44
Total length:				38:51

== Release ==
Madurai Veeran was released on 13 April 1956, during Puthandu (Tamil New Year). The film was a major success, running for over 100-days in all the 36 theatres it was screened at. It ran for over 200 days at the Madurai-based Chinthamani Theatre (the longest run for a film starring Ramachandran to that point), thereby becoming a silver jubilee film. (Note: A silver jubilee film is one that completes a theatrical run of 25 weeks.) According to R. Kannan, author of MGR: A Life, the film grossed over ₹1 crore (equivalent to ₹114 crore or US$12 million in 2023). It was later dubbed in Telugu as Sahasaveerudu.

== Critical reception ==
On the day of its release, The Indian Express called Madurai Veeran a "should-not-be-missed" film. The reviewer praised the performances of Ramachandran, T. S. Balaiah, Bhanumathi and Padmini, the comedy sequences featuring N. S. Krishnan and T. A. Mathuram, Yoganand's direction, the dialogue and music, concluding, "[Madurai Veeran] makes one interested right from the beginning to the finish." Swadesamitran too printed a positive review, as did Kanthan of Kalki, for the writing, direction and music.

== Historical accuracy ==
Although Madurai Veeran is based on a legend, it has been criticised for taking liberties, primarily with the depiction of the title character. Film historian S. Theodore Baskaran noted that the film did not depict Veeran as a direct descendant of backward parents, rather as "a baby born in the royal family who is left in the forest and brought up by a Dalit couple", mainly to appease fans. Athiyaman, founder of Athi Thamizhar Peravai, which published the book Madurai Veeran Unmai Varalaaru, also criticised the film for distorting Veeran's Dalit identity.

== Legacy ==
Madurai Veeran emerged a milestone both in the careers of Ramachandran and Padmini. The film's enormous earnings led to it becoming a precursor for many more similar films, but none equalled the success of Madurai Veeran. It was also one of the few films where the lead character played by Ramachandran dies. He avoided doing such roles since the late 1960s after his Paasam (1962) failed commercially since fans could not accept his character's death in that film. Dalit historian Stalin Rajangam believed that Arunthathiyars (a subsect of Dalits) began supporting Ramachandran after he acted as Veeran.

== Bibliography ==
- Baskaran, S. Theodore (1996). The Eye of the Serpent: An Introduction to Tamil Cinema. Chennai: East West Books. ISBN 978-93-86495-88-4.
- Kannan, R. (2017). MGR: A Life. India: Penguin Random House. ISBN 978-93-86495-88-4.
- Rajadhyaksha, Ashish; Willemen, Paul (1998) [1994]. Encyclopaedia of Indian Cinema. British Film Institute and Oxford University Press. ISBN 0-19-563579-5.
- Rajanayagam, S. (2015). Popular Cinema and Politics in South India: The Films of MGR and Rajinikanth. Routledge. ISBN 978-1-138-82203-0.
- Sundararaman (2007) [2005]. Raga Chintamani: A Guide to Carnatic Ragas Through Tamil Film Music (2nd ed.). Chennai: Pichhamal Chintamani. OCLC 295034757.
- Velayutham, Selvaraj, ed. (2008). Tamil Cinema: The Cultural Politics of India's Other Film Industry. Routledge. ISBN 978-0-203-93037-3.
