= Lena Chettiar =

Indian film producer

- Born: S. M. Letchuman Chettiar c.1904 Managiri, Sivaganga district, India
- Occupation: Film producer
- Years active: 1934–1960

Lena Chettiar (born S. M. Letchuman Chettiar) was an Indian film producer known for his works in Tamil cinema.

== Career ==
S. M. Letchuman Chettiar hailed from the Nattukottai Nagarathar clan in Chettinad. Early on in his career, Lena was known for staging plays in southern Tamil-speaking areas and was a used car dealer, who became the first person to circulate handbills about cars in Tamil. He advised M. K. Thyagaraja Bhagavathar, a stage actor, against producing films. Bhagavathar's first film Pavalakkodi, which ran well in Tamil-speaking areas of India and Ceylon (now Sri Lanka), marked the debut of Lena as a film producer. Soon after the release of Pavalakkodi, Lena moved to and managed his own production unit titled Krishna Pictures, which marked the Tamil debut of P. Kannamba. Lena was never credited as producer in any of his films as he was an "undischarged insolvent" in the later half of his life, because of which he could not carry on any business under his name. According to historian Randor Guy, he died "unsung and unhonoured".

== Filmography ==
Year	Film	Ref.
1934	Pavalakkodi	
1940	Krishnan Thoothu	
1944	Prabhavathi	
1949	Krishna Bhakthi	
1953	Marumagal	
1953	Ammalakkalu (Telugu)	
1955	Kaveri	
1956	Madurai Veeran	
1958	Mangalya Bhagyam	
1960	Raja Desingu	

== Bibliography ==
- Guy, Randor (2016). Gopal, T. S. (ed.). Memories of Madras: Its Movies, Musicians & Men of Letters. Chennai: Creative Workshop. ISBN 978-81-928961-7-5.
