= Usha Kalyanam =

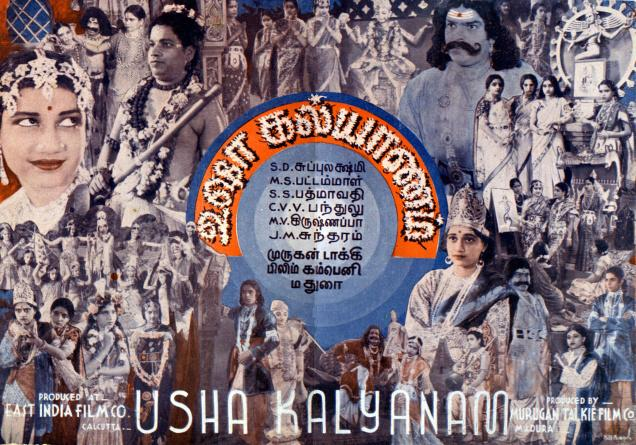
- Promotional poster
- Directed by: K. Subramaniam
- Starring: S. D. Subbulakshmi; C.V.V. Panthulu; G. Pattu Iyer
- Cinematography: Sailen Bose
- Production company: Murugan Talkies
- Release date: 1936
- Country: India
- Language: Tamil

Usha Kalyanam is a 1936 Tamil-language film directed by K. Subramaniam. The film starred S. D. Subbulakshmi, C. V. V. Panthulu and G. Pattu Iyer in lead roles.

As was the practice of that time, another film titled Kizhattu Maappillai was also screened along with this film. N. S. Krishnan and T. A. Mathuram featured in this short film.

== Plot ==
The film is based on the Hindu mythological tale of Aniruddha, the grandson of Krishna. Aniruddha and Usha, the daughter of the demon Bakasura fall in love with one another. Bakasura does not assent to their love and imprisons Aniruddha. Aniruddha is saved by Krishna who defeats Bakasura and liberates Aniruddha. Bakasura, eventually, patches up with Krishna and Usha becomes Aniruddha's second wife.

== Cast ==
The following list is adapted from the film's pressbook

- S. D. Subbulakshmi as Usha
- M. V. Krishnappa as Aniruddha
- C. V. V. Panthulu as Banasuran
- M. S. Pattammal as Chitravegai
- V. Govindasami as Krishna and Sankaranarayanan
- J. M. Sundaram as Naradar
- S. S. Padmavathi as Rukmani
- K. E. Madhava Iyer
- S. S. Rajamani
- S. Gomathi Bai

== Production ==
The film was produced by Murugan Talkies of Madurai, one of the early pioneers of Tamil film production. The company was owned by yarn merchants of the city. The film was shot in the East India Film Studios in Calcutta and directed by K. Subramanian, one of the early South Indian film pioneers. He was assisted by his uncle C. V. V. Iyer, credited as assistant director in the film.

== Soundtrack ==
As was the custom in those days, there were many songs included in the film. Altogether there were 33 songs in this film. Madhurakavi Bhaskara Das and Sathasivadas wrote the lyrics.

== Reception ==
Writing in 2012, Film Historian Randor Guy said the film is "Remembered for the interesting storyline, impressive performances by Subbulakshmi and Panthulu and deft direction by K. Subramanyam."
