= Indubala =

Indian singer (1898–1984)

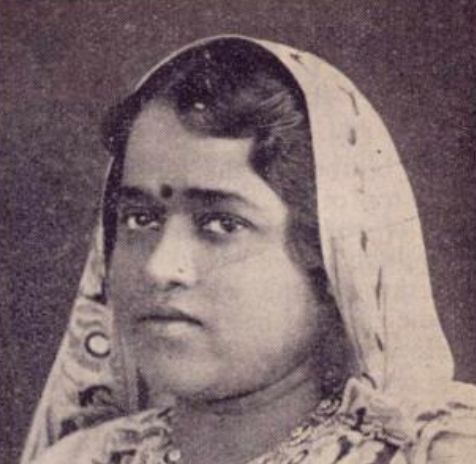
- Indubala, from a 1936 issue of The Indian Listener
- Born: 1898; Amritsar, India
- Died: 30 November 1984 (aged approximately 83); Kolkata, India
- Other names: Indubālā Debī, Miss Indubala, Indu Bala
- Occupations: Singer and actress

Indubala (1898 – 30 November 1984), sometimes credited as Miss Indubala, Indubālā Debī, or Indubala Devi, was a Bengali singer and actress. She received the Sangeet Natak Akademi Award in 1975.

== Early life ==
Indubala was born in Amritsar, the daughter of Motilal Bose and Rajabala. Her parents were with the Great Bengal Circus, and separated soon after her birth. Her father was a circus owner, her mother performed acrobatics in the circus. Her mother's other siblings included Matibala, who worked in performance, and Tinkary, a circus performer. She lived with her mother in Calcutta, where her later began her singing career. She trained as a singer in Calcutta with several teachers, including Gauhar Jaan, Kamal Dasgupta, and Kazi Nazrul Islam. Gauhar Jaan was indubala's most helpful teacher, not only teaching her to sing but also instructing her in etiquette. Indubala began her singing career as a courtesan (tawaif) in her teens. Indubala's mother wanted her to become a nurse, she had even been accepted as an intern at a hospital in Pataldanga, Kolkata. However, Indubala didn't like nursing and ultimately chose to follow in her mother's footsteps as a singer, despite her mother's disappointment at her decision to give up nursing.

== Career ==
Indubala is considered one of the great Bengali women singers. She made her first of hundreds of recordings for Gramaphone Records in 1915 or 1916. She performed on stage with her mother's company, the Rambagan Female Kali Theatre, and at the Star Theatre. She sang on All India Radio beginning in 1927, on the broadcaster's second day on the air, and regularly through the 1930s. In 1936 she was appointed court musician to the Maharaja of Mysore. Beginning in the 1930s she provided playback vocals for sound films, and she acted on-screen in more than two dozen films, including Rajrani Meera (1933), Sati Sulochana (1934), and Naveena Sarangadhara (1936). She retired from the stage in 1950. She received the Sangeet Natak Akademi Award in 1975.

Indubala lived most of her life in the Rambagan neighborhood of Calcutta, and was concerned for the welfare of the actresses and sex workers concentrated in that district. "I am Rambagan's Indu," she declared. "Here I have learnt music, established myself, and got respect."

== Personal life ==
After several years of declining health, Indubala died in 1984, in Calcutta, in her mid-eighties. She is one of the title characters of Bibhutibhushan Bandyopadhyay's short story "Einstein and Indubala" (2016). In 2020 a compilation album of Indubala's recordings was released on vinyl, by Tara Disc.
