= Rajrani Meera =

- Directed by: Debaki Bose
- Produced by: New Theatres
- Starring: Durga Khote; Prithviraj Kapoor; Pahari Sanyal; K. L. Saigal
- Cinematography: Nitin Bose
- Music by: R. C. Boral
- Production company: New Theatres
- Release date: 1933
- Running time: 151 min
- Country: India
- Language: Hindi

Rajrani Meera (Rajrani Mira) is a 1933 Hindi devotional film. It was directed by Debaki Bose for New Theatres Ltd. Calcutta. The cinematographer was Nitin Bose with music composed by R. C. Boral. The film was a bilingual, made in Bengali as Meerabai and directed by Hiren Bose and Basanta Chatterjee. The film starred Durga Khote, Prithviraj Kapoor, K. L. Saigal, Pahari Sanyal, Molina Devi and Indubala. K. L. Saigal had a small part that of a devotee in the film with Prithviraj Kapoor playing the male protagonist role. The film made Prithviraj Kapoor who played the role of the King of Mewar, Mirabai's husband, a big star and is cited as one of his career's best films.

The story revolves around the sixteenth-century saint-poet Mirabai, who suffers through hardships from her husband's family in her love for Lord Krishna, finally renouncing her family and palace to wander as a mendicant, writing bhakti poetry.

== Plot ==
Meera (Durga Khote) immersed in her love and devotion to Krishna since a young age. When she grows older, her family get her married to the Rana of Mewar, played by Prithviraj Kapoor. Misunderstandings occur when her devotional poetry is thought to be love songs for someone. Several hardships are inflicted on her by her husband and her in-laws. She takes to sitting in the temple and singing bhajans (sacred songs) composed by her. Her brother-in-law tries to have her killed many times, but fails. She finally renounces her life in the palace and wanders from place to place singing devotional songs.

== Cast ==
- Durga Khote as Mira Rani
- Prithviraj Kapoor as King of Mewar, Rana Kumbha
- K. L. Saigal
- Pahari Sanyal as Chand Batta
- Molina Devi as Sunanda
- Indubala as Charani
- Kamala Devi
- Ansari
- Khatoon
- Sankatha Prasad
- Siddiqui

== Mirabai remakes ==
The devotional films had many male saints to focus on, but the only female saint-poet who caught the interest of the film-makers was Meera bai. Several films have been made in India on the subject of Meera bai since the time of silent era. In 1921 itself there were two, Kanjibhai Rathod's Meerabai (1921) and Ramnik Desai's Meerabai (1921). In 1933 was the Hindi|Bengali Rajrani Meera/Meerabai. The other popular film was Meera (1945), by Ellis Duncan who made it as a bilingual in Tamil and Hindi. Both films had the vocals of the famous Carnatic singer M. S. Subbalakshmi. Many prominent film directors like Kidar Sharma, Nanabhai Bhatt and Gulzar made films on the story of Meera bai.

== Soundtrack ==
=== Track listing ===
#	Title
1	"Aiso Janma Nahin Baar Baar Piya"
2	"Aao Ae Bandhu Daya Nidhan"
3	"Bansi Bole Jaago Jaago Ab Mat Sona Bhai"
4	"Baso More Nainan Mein Nandlal"
5	"Chaako Raakho Jee Girdhar Lal"
6	"Chandra Kala Sis Wet Raat Thi"
7	"Chitnandan Bilmai Bhadra Ne Gheri Maiyi"
8	"Dukh Hi Pranon Ka Pyara Hai"
9	"Hari Darshan Ko Parshan Payi"
10	"Mere Janam Maran Ke Sathi"
11	"Mere To Girdhar Gopal Dusra Na Koye"
12	"Kholo Duar Maharaj Manmandir Ke"
13	"Naina Lalchavat Jiyara Udasi Shyamal Ban Mein Baaje"
14	"Piya Milan Ki Aas Miti Nahin"
15	"Piya Milan Vat Hetu Kamini"
16	"Prabhuji Is Bandhigar Se Nikaaro"
17	"Pratigya Kyun Tu Kare"
18	"Tumhre Kara Sab Such Chhodya"
19	"Suni Main Hari Awan Ki Awaaz"
