= Naveena Sadaram =

- Directed by: Krishnaswami Subrahmanyam
- Produced by: Krishnaswami Subrahmanyam
- Starring: S. D. Subbulakshmi; Vidwan Sankaralingam; Parvathi Bai; G. Pattu Iyer; Indhubala; S. S. Mani Bhagavathar; M. D. Rajam; Kunchithapadam
- Music by: Papanasam Sivan
- Production company: Madras United Artistes Corporation
- Distributed by: Madras United Artistes Corporation
- Release date: 1935
- Country: India
- Language: Tamil

Naveena Sadaram is a 1935 Tamil language film directed and produced by Krishnaswami Subrahmanyam. The film featured S. D. Subbulakshmi in the lead role. The film is an adaptation of the Kannada stage play Sadarame. Papanasam Sivan was in charge of both the score and lyrics.

== Plot ==
A woman named Sadaram (S. D. Subbulakshmi) disguises herself as a man to escape from the clutches of a petty thief (G. Pattu Iyer). She encounters a princess (Parvathi Bai) who falls in love with the man unaware that 'he' is also a woman. Both Sadaram and another woman are in love with a prince (Vidwan Sankaralingam). In the end, the prince ends up marrying Sadaram and the woman who is in love with him.

== Cast ==
Adapted from Film News Anandan and The Hindu.

- S. D. Subbulakshmi as Sadaram
- Vidwan Sankaralingam as the prince
- Parvathi Bai as the princess
- G. Pattu Iyer as the petty thief
- Indubala
- S. S. Mani Bhagavathar
- M. D. Rajam
- Kunchithapadam

== Production ==
The film was based on a Marathi play "Mitra" by Shirish Athwale, Gubbi Veeranna had adapted it into a theatre play in Kannada. The play was a hit, prompting Veeranna to make it into a film titled Sadarame (1935). In both the play and the film, Veeranna played the role of the petty thief, whose clutches the titular Sadaram is trying to escape. Sadarame too became a box office success.

Krishnaswami Subrahmanyam made it in Tamil with the title Naveena Sadaram. The prefix "Naveena" was placed before Sadaram because at the time, many stories having the same plot details were adapted for the screen by more than one producer, the later film versions of the stories placed the prefix "Naveena" to signify it was a newer version than the previous ones.

== Soundtrack ==
The film had 28 songs. Most of the tunes for the songs were adapted from Hindi films. Sivan and his nephew, S. S. Mani, sang the song "Maa Ramanan Uma Ramanan" off-screen during the film's opening credits. Two songs were sung by Indhubala, one of which was in Tamil and another in Hindi. Except "Maa Ramanan Uma Ramanan", none of the other songs became popular. No gramophone recording of the song exists but Sivan's recording of the same song rendered by M. S. Subbulakshmi in Sevasadanam (1938) became popular.

== Reception ==
Randor Guy notes that the film is "remembered for the double role of Subbulakshmi, deft direction of Subramanyam and the off-screen prayer song." S. D. Subbulakshmi's performance received appreciation from critics and filmgoers.

The play was again adapted for the screen in Tamil as Sadhaaram (1956) with Bhanumathi Ramakrishna playing Subbulakshmi's role.
