= Kaalam Maari Pochu (1956 film) =

1956 film by Tapi Chanakya

- Theatrical release poster
- Directed by: Tapi Chanakya
- Screenplay by: Kondepudi Lakshminarayana; Tapi Chanakya; C. V. R. Prasad
- Story by: K. L. Narayana
- Produced by: C. V. R. Prasad
- Starring: Gemini Ganesan; Anjali Devi; T. S. Balaiah; S. V. Subbaiah; K. A. Thangavelu
- Cinematography: Kamal Ghosh
- Edited by: Sanjeevi
- Music by: Master Venu
- Production company: Sarathi Films
- Distributed by: AVM Productions
- Release date: 4 May 1956
- Country: India
- Language: Tamil

Kaalam Maari Pochu (transl. The times have changed) is a 1956 Indian Tamil-language film directed by Tapi Chanakya, starring Gemini Ganesan and Anjali Devi. It is a remake of the Telugu film Rojulu Marayi. The film was released on 4 May 1956.

== Plot ==
The story explores the social and economic challenges faced by farmers in rural areas, interwoven with a love narrative. A money lender in the village fraudulently seizes the land of impoverished farmers after lending them money. Due to their lack of education and consequent ignorance, these farmers are unaware of how much they have paid back to the lender and lose their land. Later, the educated son of one such farmer exposes the money lender's deceit. In the presence of the District Collector, he restores the land to its rightful owners.

== Cast ==
- Gemini Ganesan
- Anjali Devi
- T. S. Balaiah
- Girija
- K. A. Thangavelu
- M. R. Santhanalakshmi
- T. S. Durairaj
- S. V. Subbaiah
- T. K. Balachandran
- Waheeda Rehman (Dance)

== Production ==
The film was originally produced in Telugu with the title Rojulu Marayi by C. V. R. Prasath and directed by Tapi Chanakya. The Tamil film was produced with entirely new cast. Dialogues and songs were written originally for the Tamil version. The dialogues were written by Muhavai Rajamanickam who was a freedom fighter and (at that time) was the leader of the then united Communist Party of India. He was also a famous writer in Tamil. The film was shot entirely on rural locations with real-life farmers partaking.

== Soundtrack ==
Music was composed by Master Venu and lyrics by Muhavai Rajamanickam. The song "Kallam Kabadam Theriyadhavane" is based on "Yeruvaaka Saagaaro Ranno Chinnanna" from Rojulu Marayi. Madurai Veeran, released one month before Kaalam Maari Pochu, had a song "Summa Kidantha Sothukku Kashtam" with the same tune. A. V. Meiyappan, the distributor of Kaalam Maari Pochu, thought the Madurai Veeran song would jeopardise the success of his film. He went as far as advertising "Dont be misled by the so-called 'Veerans' of the films!". He later filed a case against the producer of Madurai Veeran, Lena Chettiar, accusing him of plagiarism. The lawyer V. L. Ethiraj appeared for Chettiar. The judge observed that the tune of the songs are based on folklore music and no one can claim a right of ownership to such folklore music. The case was dismissed.

Song	Singers	Raga	Length
"Ennamadhellam Neeye"	M. L. Vasanthakumari	Kamboji	02:38
"Kallam kabadam Theriyadhavane"	Jikki		05:18
"Maariye Kelamma"	Thiruchi Loganathan, S. C. Krishnan, K. Rani & group		04:19
"Inithaai Naame"	Thiruchi Loganathan & Jikki	Mohanam	03:01
"Vanganne Povome"	Thiruchi Loganathan & group	Suddha Saveri	03:22
"Punnagai Thanai Veesi"	Thiruchi Loganathan, Jikki & K. Rani		04:28
"Vandi Pogudhu"	T. M. Soundararajan		03:40
"Idar Pattu"	Thiruchi Loganathan & group		00:59
"Poliyo Poli"	Thiruchi Loganathan & Group		05:19
"Aduvoma Koodi Kulavi"	Jikki		03:02

== Critical reception ==
The Hindu wrote, "Well acted, it develops its central theme – the possibility of the kisan liberating himself from the dominant influence of the rich landholder and promoting his own and the country's interest through collective effort – with considerable effect". Sport and Pastime wrote, "It is rarely that we get a picture so full-bloodedly rural as Sarathi Films' Kalam Mari Poachu". The Indian Express wrote, "S. V. Subbiah steals the sow with a masterly portrayal of the poor, humble, old-world peasant who is a great stickler to properties".
