= Vikatayogi =

- Directed by: K. Subramanyam
- Screenplay by: M. R. Velappan Nair
- Based on: The School for Husbands by Moliere
- Produced by: K. Subramanyam
- Starring: P. U. Chinnappa; T. R. Rajakumari; Kumaresan; B. S. Saroja
- Cinematography: T. S. Coatnis
- Edited by: R. Rajagopal
- Music by: Modhi Babu; Brother Lakshmanan; Radha Krishnan
- Production company: Madras United Artistes Corporation
- Release date: 23 October 1946 (India)
- Running time: 2 hr 44 min (14760 ft.)
- Country: India
- Language: Tamil

Vikatayogi (transl. The Miracle Man) is a 1946 Indian, Tamil-language film produced and directed by K. Subramanyam. The film featured P. U. Chinnappa and T. R. Rajakumari in the lead roles.

== Plot ==
Vikatayogi is a mysterious and powerful yogi who supposedly possesses supernatural abilities.

A cruel and ambitious minister schemes to seize the throne by eliminating the rightful heir to the kingdom. Through deceit and manipulation, the prince is separated from his royal lineage and grows up unaware of his true identity.

As the kingdom suffers under tyranny, Vikatayogi intervenes at critical moments, using wit, illusion, and mystical powers to protect the innocent and subtly guide events toward justice. Along the way, themes of love, loyalty, and destiny unfold, including the prince’s romance and the suffering of those oppressed by the villain’s rule.

In the climax, Vikatayogi reveals the truth about the prince’s heritage, exposes the minister’s treachery, and restores order to the kingdom.

== Cast & Crew ==
The lists are adapted from the database of Film News Anandan

=== Cast ===
- P. U. Chinnappa
- T. R. Rajakumari
- Kumaresan
- B. S. Saroja
- T. R. Ramachandran
- T. S. Damayanthi

=== Crew ===
- Producer &
- Director = K. Subramanyam
- Screenplay = M. R. Velappan Nair
- Cinematography = T. S. Coatnis
- Editing = R. Rajagopal
- Art = T. V. S. Sarma

== Production ==
The story was obliquely adapted from Moliere’s play, The School for Husbands. Vikatayogi was filmed at Meenakshi Cinetone, which then became Neptune Studios and eventually Sathya Studios.

This film lofted B. S. Saroja who was performing as a group dancer earlier, to stardom.

== Soundtrack ==
Music was composed by Modhi Babu, Brother Lakshmanan and Radha Krishnan while the lyrics were penned by Udumalai Narayana Kavi and Rajagopala Iyer.

== Trivia ==
K. Subramanyam planned a film with M. K. Thyagaraja Bhagavathar in the lead and had recorded one song sung by Bhagavathar. However, he could not proceed with the film as Bhagavathar went to prison. Subramanyam used that song in this film creating an apt scene. Thus a PUC film had a Bhagavathar song in it!
