= V. N. Janaki =

Indian first female chief minister of Tamil Nadu (1923–1996)

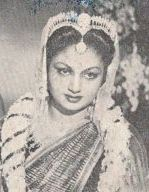
- Janaki in the 1948 film Mohini

4th Chief Minister of Tamil Nadu
- In office 7 January 1988 – 30 January 1988
- Governor: Sundar Lal Khurana
- Cabinet: Janaki ministry
- Preceded by: V. R. Nedunchezhiyan
- Succeeded by: President's rule
- Constituency: Did not contest

02nd President of the All India Anna Dravida Munnetra Kazhagam
- In office 02 January 1988 – 09 February 1989
- Preceded by: M. G. Ramachandran
- Succeeded by: J. Jayalalithaa

Personal details
- Born: Vaikom Narayani Janaki; 30 November 1923 Vaikom, Travancore State, British India (present-day Kerala, India)
- Died: 19 May 1996 (aged 72) Madras, Tamil Nadu, India
- Cause of death: Cardiac arrest
- Resting place: M. G. R. Thottam
- Party: All India Anna Dravida Munnetra Kazhagam
- Spouse: Ganapathy Bhat (m. 1939; div. 1951) M. G. Ramachandran (m. 1962; died 1987)
- Children: 1
- Parents: Rajagopala Iyer (father); Narayani Amma (mother)
- Relatives: Papanasam Sivan (uncle)
- Profession: Actress; Politician

Vaikom Narayani Janaki (30 November 1923 – 19 May 1996), also known as Janaki Ramachandran, was an Indian actress and politician, who served as the chief minister of Tamil Nadu in 1988. She was elected as the chief minister after the death of her husband M. G. Ramachandran, who was the leader of the All India Anna Dravida Munnetra Kazhagam, and served in the post for 24 days. She was the first woman to become the chief minister of the state.

== Early and personal life ==
Vaikom Narayani Janaki was born in Vaikom in Travancore State on 30 November 1923. Her father, Rajagopal Iyer, was a Tamil Brahmin from Palakkad, and was the elder brother of the musician and composer Papanasam Sivan. Her mother was Narayani Amma.

In 1939, aged 17, Janaki married Ganapathy Bhat (1915–1972), and they had a son, Surendran. She later divorced Bhat in 1951. Following the death of M. G. Ramachandran's second wife Sadananthavathi in 25th February 1962, she moved in with him. They legally married shortly afterwards, on 14th June 1962. They did not have any children together.

== Film career ==
Janaki began her film career in 1939 with a minor role in Manmatha Vijayam, and later did minor roles in other films. She began acting in lead roles with Sakata Yogam in 1946 and Chandralekha in 1948 brought her popularity. She was paired with Ramachandran in Raja Mukthi and Mohini in the same year. Her other notable films included, Velaikaari (1949) and Marudhanaattu Ilavarasi (1950). Her last film was Naam in 1953.

== Political career ==
Ramachandran was the founder of the political party All India Anna Dravida Munnetra Kazhagam (AIADMK), and became the chief minister of Tamil Nadu in 1977. Janaki was not politically active during the period and made only a few public appearances during the party's early days. However, when Ramachandran suffered a stroke in 1984, she served as a liaison between him and the members of his party. After Ramachandran's death in 1987, Janaki was asked by his party members to take his place.

Janaki became the chief minister on 7 January 1988, and was the first woman to serve in the post. Then Tamil Nadu governor Sundar Lal Khurana gave her three weeks to prove her majority in the legislative assembly. During her tenure, the Janaki-led government announced the institution of two awards in the name of Ramachandran, carrying cash prizes of ₹25,000 each for original works on science and technology in Tamil language. The government launched a free footwear distribution scheme, estimated to cost ₹230 million (equivalent to ₹3.1 billion or US$33 million in 2026), aimed at benefiting around nine million school children and four million women.

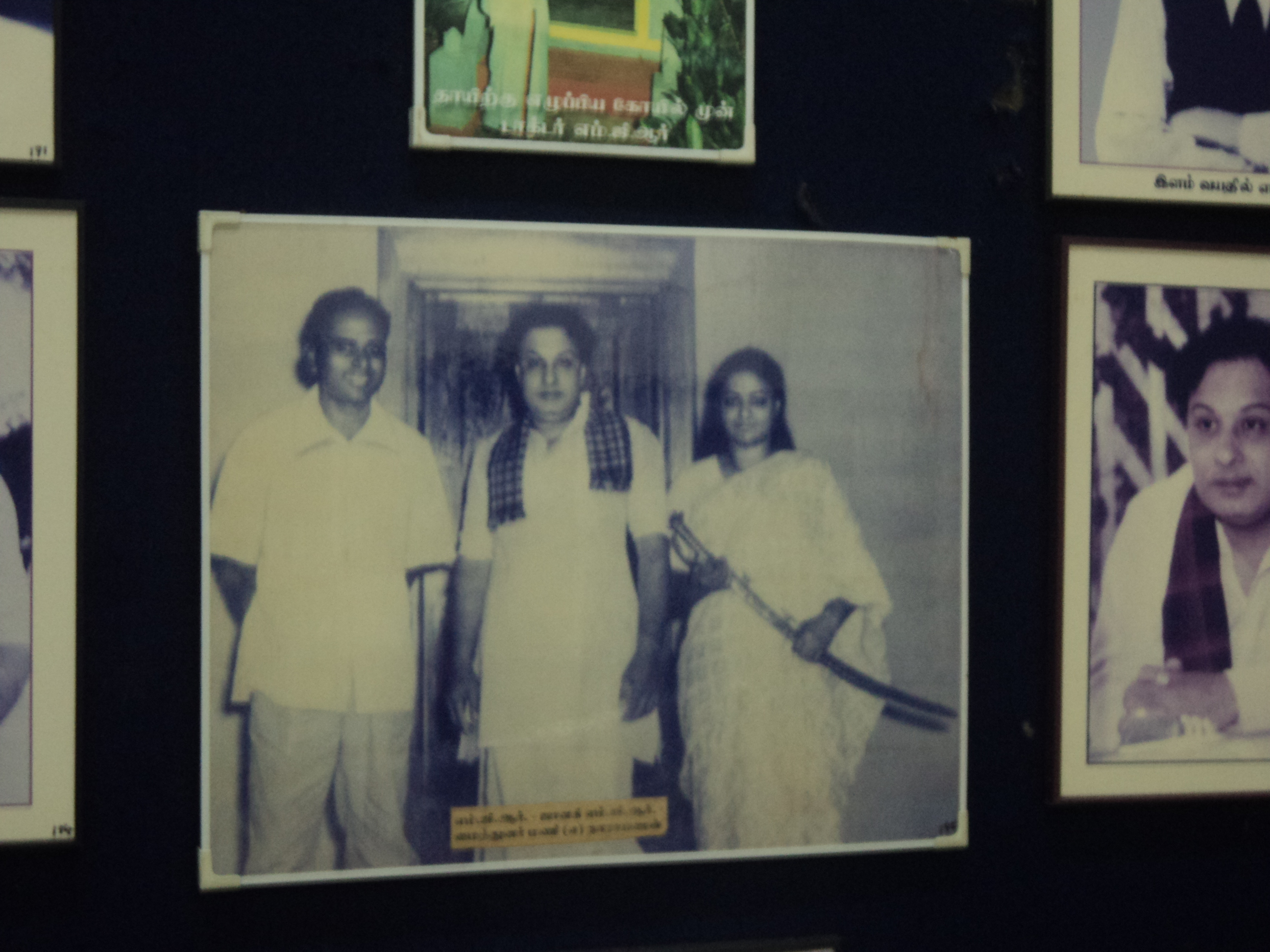
Janaki (right) with Ramachandran (center)

Janaki faced a vote of confidence in the Tamil Nadu assembly. Her party, the AIADMK, had split into multiple factions. Initially, the speaker declared that Janaki had won the confidence vote, after he disqualified a set of members, who had split from the AIADMK. However, the vote was conducted in chaos, with the members of the ruling and opposition parties clashing inside the assembly, and the police being called into the house. The union government under Rajiv Gandhi used the Article 356 of the Constitution of India to dismiss her government later. Hence, her government lasted only 24 days.

The Election Commission of India later froze the "two Leaves" symbol of the AIADMK on 17 December 1988, after the party was split into two factions– AIADMK (JA) under Janaki and AIADMK (J) under Jayalalithaa. Her faction contested on the "double pigeon" symbol in the 1989 Tamil Nadu Legislative Assembly election, and won only two seats. She quit politics after the two factions of the party were unified later.

== Later life and death ==
Janaki donated the property in V.P. Raman Salai to the AIADMK, which subsequently became the headquarters of the party in 1986. She was the founder chairman of The Satya Educational & Charitable Society, and the Janaki Ramachandran Educational & Charitable Trust, which manage several educational institutions including Dr.MGR Janaki College of Arts and Science for Women and Dr.MGR Home and Higher Secondary School for the Speech and Hearing Impaired.

Janaki died of cardiac arrest at afternoon on 19 May 1996 in Chennai, and was buried beside her residence at MGR Thottam in Raamapuram.

On 19 May, shortly after 5:00 p.m. IST, AIADMK General Secretary J. Jayalalithaa accompanied by senior leaders V. R. Nedunchezhiyan and S. D. Somasundaram, paid floral tributes to the mortal remains of V. N. Janaki Ramachandran at her residence in Ramapuram. The state government declared a one-day holiday on 20 May as a mark of respect. Then newly sworn M. Karunanidhi and his cabinet paid their respects that evening at the Ramapuram residence of V. N. Janaki Ramachandran, where her last rites were held on the afternoon of 20 May. On 24 May, the Tamil Nadu Legislative Assembly adopted a condolence motion for Janaki Ramachandran and Rani Annadurai (who died on 6 May), widow of former Chief Minister C. N. Annadurai, moved by Speaker P. T. R. Palanivel Rajan. The House was then adjourned for the day, and Karunanidhi ordered the installation of Janaki's portrait among the former CMs at the Secretariat.

== Filmography ==
This is a partial filmography. You can expand it.

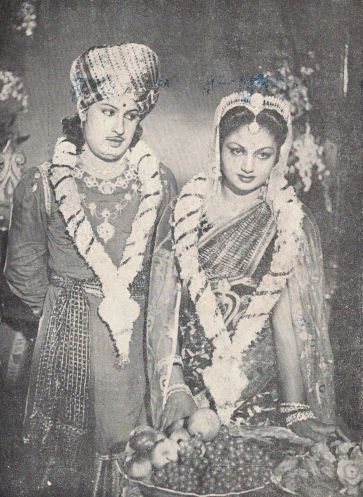
Janaki with MGR in Mohini (1948)

=== 1930s ===
Year	Film	Role	Notes
1939	Manmatha Vijayam	As dancer	

=== 1940s ===
Year	Film	Role	Notes
1940	Krishnan Thoothu	As dancer	
1940	Mummanigal	As dancer	
1941	Kacha Devayani	As dancer	
1941	Savithiri	As dancer	
1941	Mani Malai	As dancer	
1942	Ananthasayanam	Sarasa	
1942	Gangavathar	Heavenly maiden	
1943	Devakanya	Chitraleka	
1944	Bharthruhari	Pingala's companion	
1945	Maanasamrakshanam		
1946	Sakata Yogam		As lead actress
1947	Pankajavalli		
1947	Chitra Bagavali		
1947	Thiyagi		
1947	1000 Thalaivangi Apoorva Chinthamani	Apoorva Chinthamani	
1948	Chandralekha	a gypsy girl	
1948	Raja Mukthi	Queen Mrinalini	
1948	Mohini	Mohini	
1949	Velaikaari	Sarasa	

=== 1950s ===
Year	Film	Role	Notes
1950	Marudhanaattu Ilavarasi	Princess Rani	
1950	Laila Majnu	Zarina	
1950	Chandrika		Malayalam
1951	Devaki	Devaki	
1953	Naam	Meena	

== Elections contested and positions held ==
=== Tamil Nadu Legislative Assembly elections ===
Elections	Assembly	Constituency	Political party	Result	Vote percentage	Opposition		
Elections	Assembly	Constituency	Political party	Result	Vote percentage	Candidate	Political party	Vote percentage
1989	9th	Andipatti	AIADMK(JA)	Lost	21.40%	P. Aasiyan	DMK	29.50%

=== Positions in Tamil Nadu Legislative Assembly ===
Elections	Position	Elected constituency	Term in office		
Elections	Position	Elected constituency	Assumed office	Left office	Time in office
1984	Chief Minister	Not Contested	7 January 1988	30 January 1988	23 days

Political offices
Preceded by M. G. Ramachandran	Chief Minister of Tamil Nadu; 1988	Succeeded by Karunanidhi
