= Pavalakkodi (1934 film) =

1934 film by K. Subramanyam

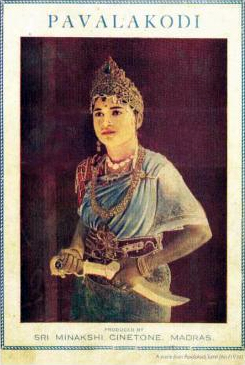
- Poster
- Directed by: K. Subramanyam
- Produced by: S. M. Lakshmana Chettiar
- Starring: M. K. Thyagaraja Bhagavathar; S. D. Subbulakshmi; R. S. Sundarambal; S. S. Mani Bhagavathar
- Music by: Papanasam Sivan
- Release date: 1934
- Language: Tamil

Pavalakkodi is a 1934 Tamil language film starring M. K. Thyagaraja Bhagavathar and directed by K. Subramanyam. It was the first film for both of them. The film's music was composed by Papanasam Sivan.

== Production ==
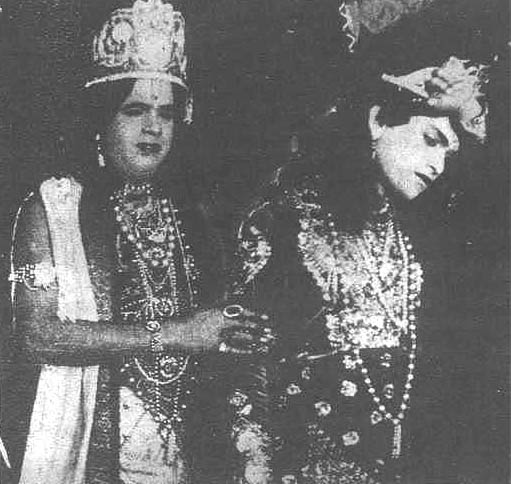
S. S. Mani Bhagavathar as Lord Krishna and M. K. Thyagaraja Bhagavathar as Karna in the film.

Pavalakkodi (lit. Coral Chain) was originally a successful stage play acted out by a troupe of artists composed of Thyagaraja Bhagavathar, Mani Bhagavathar and S. D. Subbulakshmi. The troupe toured all over Tamil Nadu, Ceylon, Malaya and Singapore staging the play. S. M. Lakshmana Chettiar (Lena), a prominent businessman, R. M. Alagappa Chettiar and K. Subramanyam watched it at Karaikudi. Impressed by the play, they decided to produce a film based on it. The lead actors, M. K. Thyagaraja Bhagavathar and S. D. Subbulakshmi were hired for Rs. 4,000 and Rs. 2,500, respectively. This was the first film for both of them, and also the first for Subramanyam as director. A vacant piece of land (present day campus of Dr. MGR Janaki College of Arts and Science for Women) in Adyar was chosen for filming. Subramanyam established his studio at the site and called it Meenakshi Cinetones. Filming was done outdoors using sunlight. Scenes were shot continuously when the sun was shining brightly and breaks were called when it became cloudy. Whenever the cloud cover broke, cast and crew rushed to resume filming, abandoning their food packets. The abandoned food attracted a lot of crows from the wooded Adyar surroundings. The cawing of crows was a nuisance to recording (songs and dialogues were recorded directly on the spot). Subramanyam hired an Anglo Indian named Joe to fire his rifle in the air and scare away the crows. Joe was credited in the film credits as "Crow Shooter". The studio did not have its own lab and scenes were shot without knowing how they would turn out. All the post-production work was done at Bombay.

== Plot ==
Pavalakkodi tells the eventual turn of events between Hinduism deity Rama and Karna because of Draupadi and the two with their brothers declare war on each other.

== Cast ==
- M. K. Thyagaraja Bhagavathar as Karnan
- R. S. Sundarambal as Rama
- S. S. Mani Bhagavathar as Krishnan
- S. D. Subbulakshmi as Draupadi
- K. K. Parvathi Bai as Padmavati

== Soundtrack ==
The film had 50 songs, of which 22 were sung by M. K. Thyagaraja Bhagavathar. Some of the popular songs from the movie are:

- Somasekara (Raga: Karaharapriya)
- Kanna Kariyamugil Vanna (Raga: Bhairavi)
- Vanithaikul Uyirvaana
- Munnam oru Sanyasi Vadivaaki

== Reception ==
Pavalakkodi was a silver jubilee hit and ran for 275 days (9 months). It was also one of the earliest commercially successful Tamil films. On the successful completion of the film, Subramanyam married S. D. Subbulakshmi as his second wife. Pavalakkodi set the stage for M. K. Thyagaraja Bhagavathar's eventful career as the first superstar of Tamil Cinema. The single remaining print of this film has been preserved at National Film Archives, Pune.
