= Pharaju =

Janya raga of Carnatic music

Pharaju is a Janya rāgam in Carnatic music, a musical scale of South Indian classical music.

== Popular Compositions ==
- Thillana By Patnam Subramanya Iyer
