= T. R. Ramachandran =

Indian actor (1917–1990)

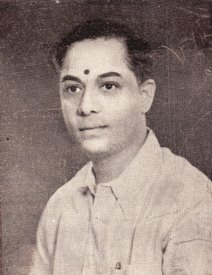
- T. R. Ramachandran in late 1940s
- Born: 9 January 1917; Tirukampuliyur, Trichinopoly District, Madras Presidency, British India (now in Karur district, Tamil Nadu, India)
- Died: 30 November 1990 (aged 73); Los Angeles, California, United States
- Occupation: Actor
- Years active: 1938–1982
- Spouse: R Seetha (Married on 9 February 1947)

Thirukampuliyur Ranga Ramachandran (9 January 1917 – 30 November 1990) was an Indian actor and comedian who acted mainly in Tamil films. He was cast mostly in lead or supportive roles, especially in comical parts, from the 1940s to the 1960s. Known for his distinctive saucer-eyes, Ramachandran was known as "The Eddie Cantor of India".

== Early life ==
Thirukampuliyur Ranga Ramachandran was born in Tirukampuliyur in Tiruchi district. As a child, he had no interest in studies and played truant from school.

== Filmography ==
Year	Title	Role	Notes
1938	Nandakumar		First film as actor.
1940	Vaayaadi	A hen-pecked husband	First movie as lead
1941	Naveena Markandeyar	Markandeya	
1941	Thiruvalluvar		
1941	Sabapathy	Sabapathy Mudaliar	First hit movie. Ramachandran's most popular role ever
1942	Kannagi	Shastri	
1943	Dewan Bahadur		
1943	Devakanya	Rangan	
1944	Prabhavathi	Bhadaranadan	
1945	Maanasamrakshanam		
1945	Sri Valli	Killi	
1946	Arthanaari		
1946	Lavangi	Gopu	
1946	Sakata Yogam		
1946	Vidyapathi	Vidyapathi	
1946	Vijayalakshmi		
1946	Vikatayogi		
1947	Nam Iruvar	Gnanodhayam	
1947	Kadagam		
1947	Kundalakesi		
1947	Mahathma Udhangar		
1947	Rukmangadhan		
1948	Gnana Soundari	Michael	
1948	Gokuladasi		
1948	Samsara Nowka		
1949	Geetha Gandhi	Subbaiyer	
1949	Navajeevanam		
1949	Vazhkai	Nathan	As the "bachelor father"
1951	Saudamini		
1951	Singari		
1952	Mappillai		
1953	Marumagal		
1954	Kalyanam Panniyum Brammachari	Ganapathi	
1954	Ponvayal	Sengodan	Also Producer
1954	Rajee En Kanmani	Ramu	
1955	Kathanayaki		
1955	Ellam Inba Mayam	Ganesh	
1955	Methavigal		
1955	Asai Anna Arumai Thambi	Balaraman	
1955	Gomathiyin Kaadhalan	Rajan	Also Producer
1955	Kalvanin Kadhali	Kamalapathi	
1957	Manamagan Thevai	K. Dhandapani (KD)	
1957	Samaya Sanjeevi		
1957	Thangamalai Ragasiyam	Prince Azhagesan	
1957	Yaar Paiyan	Sankar	
1958	Anbu Engey	Appavu	
1958	Kadan Vaangi Kalyaanam	Thiyagarajan	
1958	Neelavukku Neranja Manasu		
1959	Vannakili	Natarajan	
1959	Nalla Theerpu		
1959	Paththarai Maathu Thangam		
1959	President Panchaksharam		
1959	Raja Sevai		
1959	Aval Yaar		
1959	Deivame Thunai		
1960	Adutha Veetu Penn	Mannaru	
1960	Baghdad Thirudan		
1960	Padikkadha Medhai	Raghu	
1960	Meenda Sorgam	Gopu	
1960	Aalukkoru Veedu	Gopal	
1960	Vidivelli	Babu	
1961	Punar Jenmam	Nithyanantham	
1961	Ellam Unakkaga		
1962	Paasam		
1962	Sengamala Theevu		
1962	Aalayamani	Aatkondan Pillai's Son	
1963	Arivaali	Eklove	
1963	Vanambadi	Nithyanandham	
1963	Iruvar Ullam	Sri Paramathma	
1963	Naan Vanangum Dheivam	Gopal	
1963	Kalyaniyin Kanavan	Sigamani	
1966	Anbe Vaa	Punniyakodi	
1966	Sadhu Mirandal	Pasubathi	
1967	Anubavam Pudhumai		
1968	Thirumal Perumai	Ranga	
1968	Thillana Mohanambal	Varathan	
1969	Anbalippu	Nayar	
1982	Deviyin Thiruvilaiyadal		

== Discography ==
Year	Film	Language	Song	Music director	Co-singer
1941	Sabapathy	Tamil	Kaadhal Vegam	R. Sudarsanam	R. Padma
1941	Sabapathy	Tamil	Mythilli Maane	R. Sudarsanam	R. Padma
1943	Devakanya	Tamil	Nalungita Vati Penne	Palavangudi V. Shama Iyer	
1943	Devakanya	Tamil	Verilay Vetitha...Parilay Sirantha	Palavangudi V. Shama Iyer	T. S. Jaya
1943	Devakanya	Tamil	Buvan Mathi Anta Sarasaram	Palavangudi V. Shama Iyer	
1943	Dewan Bahadur	Tamil	En Ullam Adhai	T. A. Kalyanam & K. V. Mahadevan	J. Susheela
1944	Poompavai	Tamil	Gangaiyinal Thangakkudam Nirumpum	Addepalli Rama Rao	A. R. Sakunthala
1946	Vidyapathi	Tamil	Aantavane Enaiyal	Adeppalli Rama Rao	
1946	Vidyapathi	Tamil	Booloka Janaki Mane ... Shri Ramasami Ramana	Adeppalli Rama Rao	K. V. Janaki
1949	Navajeevanam	Tamil	Ennai Pol Sokkukaaran	S. V. Venkataraman	
1949	Vaazhkai	Tamil	Manamevum Aasai.... Un Kann Unnai Emaatrinaal	R. Sudarsanam	
1949	Vaazhkai	Tamil	Senthamizhum Suvaiyum Polave	R. Sudarsanam	M. S. Rajeswari
1949	Vaazhkai	Tamil	Senthamizhum Suvaiyum Polave	R. Sudarsanam	M. S. Rajeswari & T. S. Bagavathi
1953	Manidhanum Mirugamum	Tamil	Unnai Ninaikka Ninaikka	G. Govindarajulu Naidu	Jikki
1953	Manidhanum Mirugamum	Tamil	Mottaarukku Battery Pole	G. Govindarajulu Naidu	Jikki
1953	Marumagal	Tamil	Nianikkira Maaadhiri Ellaam	C. R. Subburaman & G. Ramanathan	M. L. Vasanthakumari
1953	Marumagal	Tamil	Romaani Maambazham Roobamthaan	C. R. Subburaman & G. Ramanathan	A. P. Komala
1954	Ponvayal	Tamil	Namma Kalyaanam Romba Nalla	Thurayur Rajgopal Sarma & R. Rajagopal	N. L. Ganasaraswathi
