= Raja Rajan (film) =

- Theatrical release poster
- Directed by: T. V. Sundaram
- Written by: Elangovan
- Produced by: P. Subramaniam
- Starring: M. G. Ramachandran; Padmini; Lalitha
- Cinematography: N. S. Mani; P. B. Mani
- Edited by: K. D. George
- Music by: K. V. Mahadevan
- Production company: Neela Productions
- Release date: 26 April 1957
- Running time: 170 minutes
- Country: India
- Language: Tamil

Raja Rajan (transl. King of kings) is a 1957 Indian Tamil-language historical adventure film starring M. G. Ramachandran, Padmini and Lalitha. The film was released on 26 April 1957, and did not do well at the box-office, running for just over 50 days in theatres.

== Plot ==
General Nagavelan plans to murder Prince Rajarajan in order to be the Chozha king. When Rajarajan is away for a hunting trip Nagevelan feeds a false story to the Chozha people that the former is a womaniser and drunkard. The people believed that Rajarajan was dead in the jungle. Actually, Rajarajan was held captive and was being forced to signature by Nagavelan. Nagavelan's younger sister Priyamohini who opposes her brother's deeds assists the wounded Rajarajan to escape. Udhayachandhran, who is Nagavelan's assistant, is in love with Priyamohini but she rejects his advances not only because he is working for Nagavelan but she is in love with Rajarajan too.

Rajarajan takes refuge under his teacher Uthselan Kavirayar's place. Uthselan nurses advise Rajarajan to meet up Nangoor's King Keerthivarman who is Rajarajan's father's close aid and also seek assistance from hunter's tribe king Vengkathevan. Nagavelan paints a bad picture about Rajarajan's bad deeds to King Keerthivarman and Queen Senbagavalli under the pretext in asking them to take over Rajarajan's reign. Nagavelan's actual plan is to be the king and marry King Keerthivarman and Queen Senbagavalli's only daughter Princess Rama. Curious King Keerthivarman sets off to Rajarajan's country to assess himself the situation over there.

Rajarajan saves Queen Senbagam and Princess Rama who were travelling to the temple, from Nagavelan's thugs but do not reveal his identity. On his way, exhausted Rajarajan is found by king Venkathevan's daughter who informs Head (S M Thirupathysami). Sargunam, who is Uthselan's assistant arrives there to offer help. Uthselan, Vengkathevan, Sargunam and Rajarajan hatches a plan to indirectly educate the people of the real situation by street dramas and stage plays. Nagavelan founds about this and arrests Uthselan and Vengkathevan but Uthselan reminds that the state's law says that should there be no candidate for the king, the royal elephant would be sent off to garland then man of its own choice. King Keerthivarman agrees to this and carries out the process immediately and leaves to Nangoor but Nagavelan orders Udhayachandhran to kill the person who is garlanded by the elephant Sargunam joins Nagavelan's court as an astrologer in order to find out more of Nagavelan's plans. Meanwhile, princess Rama learns from Priyamohini that Rajarajan is a good hearted, brave and well mannered man liked by his country's people and begins to fall for Rajarajan. The royal elephant identifies Rajarajan and garlands him but Udhayachandhran captures and imprisons him. Nagavelan is furious to know that Rajarajan is alive and pushes Rajarajan to the crocodile pond and assumes Rajarajan is dead.

Rajarajan escapes this where Uthselan and Vengkathevan is happy to see this. Meanwhile, Nagavelan announces a lie that no candidate is chosen by the royal elephant and invites King Keerthivarman to ascend the throne but plans his henchmen to warn King Keerthivarman that Queen Senbagavalli and Princess Rama lives are in danger. Before King Keertivarman leaves to Nangoor, he assures to Uthselan and Vengkathevan that Rajarajan should be made king if he returns. Priyamohini learns that Rajarajan and Princess Rama are in love. Nagavelan arrests Uthselan and Sargunam lets know the news to Vengkathevan. Rajarajan disguises himself as an ascetic and meets up King Keerthivarman in order to make the latter realise of the real situation but he could not be long over there as Nagavelan and Udhayachandhran came over with the intention of further defaming Rajarajan. Rajarajan leaves on the persuasion of Princess Rama and leaves a note to King Keerthivarman about Nagavelan's bad deeds. Instead Nagavelan manipulates the situation and tricks King Keerthivarman's family into going to Chozha country.

Sargunam wontedly lets know King Keerthivarman of Nagavelan's plan and prophecies that Uthselan had escaped from the prison. King Keerthivarman decrees Nagavelan to gather the people at the king court tomorrow. Udhayachandhran suspects Sargunam to be the traitor and Nagavelan kills Sargunam. King Keerthivarman arranges Queen Senbagavalli and Princess Rama to be sent to Nangoor but Nagavelan intervenes and arrests King Keerthivarman with the help of Udhayachandhran. Sargunam escapes and informs Vengkathevan and Rajarajan regarding the situation and leaves to Chozha country to gather more information of the current happenings. Nagavelan produces King Keerthivarman at the Chozha king's court and accuses the latter of murdering Rajarajan. Nagavelan threatens to kill Princess Rama should King Keerthivarman tries to defend himself and also threatens Queen Senbagavalli to be his witness or King Keerthivarman would be killed. The king court found King Keerthivarman to be guilty and informs that Nagavelan has the right whether to imprison or behead King Keerthivarman. Nagavelan meets King Keerthivarman and promises the latter would be release him if Princess Rama marries Nagavelan to which King Keerthivarman refuses. Sargunam learns about this and lets know Uthselan, Vengkathevan and Rajarajan. Rajarajan saves King Keerthivarman from being beheaded and salvaged under Vengkathevan.

Upon from the pressure from Priyamohini to stand up for the righteous, Udhayachandhran refuses to murder Uthselan when ordered by Nagavelan gets arrested for this. When Uthselan and Rajarajan intend to inform Queen Senbagavalli and Princess Rama that King Keerthivarman is safe and transfer them to a safe place, Rajarajan proceeds but Uthselan is killed by Nagavelan. Rajarajan manages to meet Queen Senbagavalli and Princess Rama and informs them about King Keerthivarman but then is attacked by Nagavelan's soldiers. Priyamohini helped the wounded Rajarajan and hides him. Priyamohini sets Udhayachandhran free in order for the latter to assist Rajarajan and both men became good friends. Udhayachandhran reveals his love to Priyamohini but she does not reciprocate as she is in love with Rajarajan even though he loves Princess Rama. Vengkathevan tricks Nagavelan's soldiers and enters Nagavelan's palace and pretend to claim that Rajarajan is a traitor. Nagavelan believes this and sends his best soldiers to assist Vengkathevan to capture Rajarajan, instead Nagavelans soldier is captured by Vengkathevan's men.

Nagavelan assaults Princess Rama and intervened by Priyamohini but to no avail. Priyamohini rushes to seek Rajarajan and Udhayachandhran help but was surprised too see Udhayachnadhran has a duel with Rajarajan in order to win Pryamohini's heart. Priyamohini is accidentally killed by Udhayachnadhran while she was trying to intervene in their sword fight. Meanwhile, Venkathevan and King Keerthivarman drive Nangoor's soldiers into Chozha country. Nagavelan tries to escape but is killed by Rajarajan. Rajarajan weds Princess Rama and becomes the king of Chozha.

== Cast ==
- M. G. Ramachandran as Prince Rajarajan
- P. S. Veerappa as General Nagavelan
- M. N. Nambiar as Udhayachandhran
- M. G. Chakrapani as Uthselan Kavirayar
- R. Balasubramaniam as King Keerthivarman
- Friend Ramasami as Sargunam
- T. N. Sivathanu
- C. V. V. Panthulu
- N. M. Muthukoothan
- R. M. Somasundaram
- Josh Prakash
- Padmini as Princess Rama
- Lalitha as Priyamohini
- S. D. Subbulakshmi as Queen Senbagavalli
- G. Sakunthala
- S. V. Vasantha
- Lakshmi

== Soundtrack ==
The music composed by K. V. Mahadevan. One unusual feature is that Mahadevan had used S. C. Krishnan (known for singing comedy songs) to Ramachandran's one song "Mahamaayi Aankala Deviye" for a sequence of spirit possession.

Song	Singers	Lyrics	Length
"Aadum Azhage Azhagu"	P. Leela & Soolamangalam Rajalakshmi	Pugazhendhi	05:06
"Aala Pirandha Rajapaadu"	Tiruchi Loganathan, Muthukoothan & Vadivambal	Muthukoothan	01:35
"Haiyahoo Jingadi Jayya"	Srinivasan & Party	Kavi Lakshmanadas	02:27
"Idhayam Thannaye"	Seerkazhi Govindarajan & A. P. Komala	A. Maruthakasi	03:32
"Kalaiyadha Aasai Kanave"	R. Balasaraswathi Devi	A. Maruthakasi	02:19
"Kaththinaale Kaariyam Saadhik"	S. C. Krishnan & Vadivambal	Muthukoothan	02:28
"Mahamaayi Aankala Deviye"	S. C. Krishnan	Muthukoothan	04:32
"Nilavodu Vaanmugil"	Seerkazhi Govindarajan & A. P. Komala	Ku. Sa. Krishnamoorthy	02:59
"Senthamizh Naadennum"	Udutha Sarojini + Chorus	Mahakavi Bharathiyar	03:47
"Vettaiyada Vaarum Mannava"	Tiruchi Loganathan, S. C. Krishnan & Vadivambal	Muthukoothan	02:16
"Kalaiyadha Aasai Kanave" (pathos)	R. Balasaraswathi Devi	A. Maruthakasi	02:41
