= K. Subramanyam =

Indian film director

K. Subramaniyam
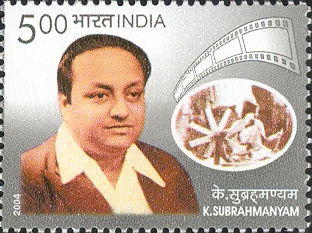
- Born: Krishnasamy Subramaniyam; 20 April 1904; Papanasam, Madras Presidency, British India
- Died: 7 April 1971 (aged 66); Madras
- Occupations: Film Director, film producer, and screenwriter
- Years active: 1931–1957
- Children: Padma Subrahmanyam

Krishnasamy Subramaniyam (20 April 1904 – 7 April 1971) was an Indian film director of the 1930s and 1940s.

== Personal life ==
Subramanyam was born in a Brahmin family. Classical Bharatnatyam dancer Padma Subrahmanyam is his daughter and popular television presenter S. V. Ramanan is his son. Ace music composer Anirudh Ravichander is his great-grandson (Ramanan's daughter, Lakshmi Ravichander's son)

== Career ==
Subramaniyam contributed to the establishment of the Tamil film industry. He started his film career as a scenarist and producer, working on P. K. Raja Sandow's silent films such as Peyum Pennum. He started Meenakshi Cineton with Alagappa Chettiar, directing his first film Pavalakkodi, in which the Tamil film star M. K. Thyagaraja Bhagavathar debuted. He made a shift with the politically emphatic Balayogini, criticizing the caste system prevalent then.

In 1938, he made Sevasadanam, advocating a better deal for women, in 1940 the film Bhaktha Chetha, critiquing untouchability, and in 1945 the war effort film Maanasamrakshanam. His best-known work is Thyaga Bhoomi, based on a novel by Kalki Krishnamurthy, which was banned by the British government. He also directed the Malayalam film, Prahlada (1941), which was scripted by noted playwright N. P. Chellappan Nair. He was one of the founders of Nadigar Sangam in 1952.

== Filmography ==
- Pavalakkodi (1934)
- Naveena Sadaram (1935)
- Naveena Sarangadhara (1936)
- Kuchela (1936)
- Usha Kalyanam (1936)
- Balayogini (1937)
- Mr. Ammanchi (1937)
- Kowsalya Parinayam (1937)
- Sevasadanam (1938)
- Thyaga Bhoomi (1939)
- Bhaktha Chetha (1940)
- Prahlada (1941) (Malayalam)
- Kacha Devayani (1941) (Tamil)
- Ananthasayanam (1942)
- Barthruhari (1944)
- Maanasamrakshanam (1945)
- Vikatayogi (1946)
- Vichitra Vanitha (1947)
- Kapati Arakshakaya (1948) (Sinhalese)
- Gokuladasi (1948)
- Geetha Gandhi (1949)
- Kacha Devayani (1956) (Kannada)
