= S. S. Mani Bhagavathar =

Indian singer and actor

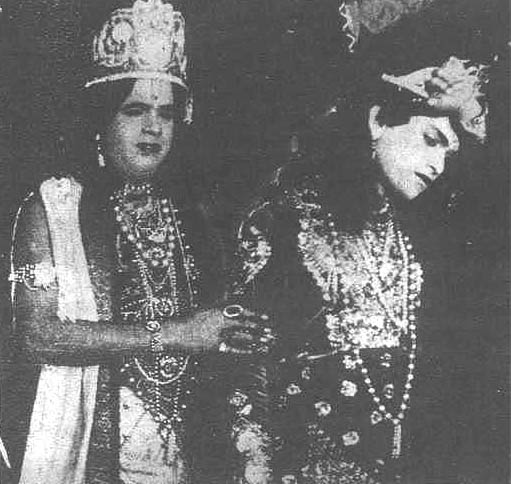
- S. S. Mani as Krishna (left) and M. K. Thyagaraja Bhagavathar (right) as Arjuna in Pavalakkodi (1934)
- Born: S. Subramanian Mani Bhagavathar; Thirupanangudi, Mayavaram
- Other name: S. S. Mani
- Occupations: singer, cinema actor, playback singer
- Known for: Naveena Sadaram (1935), Pavalakkodi (1934)

S. S. Mani Bhagavathar was an Indian Carnatic music singer, cine actor and a playback singer in Tamil language films.

== Early life ==
Born at Thirupanangudi in Mayiladuthurai, his full name was S. Subramanian Mani Bhagavathar. He was the principal disciple of the composer Papanasam Sivan.

== Music career ==
Whenever Papanasam Sivan composed a new song, he would first teach it to S. S. Mani to sing. Mani's duty was to practice it well and then demonstrate it to famous singers like D. K. Pattammal, Madurai Mani Iyer and many others. Every year, during the Tamil month of Margazhi (December–January), Papanasam Sivan will do the street Bhajan circulating Kapaleeshwarar Temple in Mylapore with a group of singers. Mani was one of the regular group member. After the death of Papanasam Sivan, Mani continued the Bhajan until his dying day. S. S. Mani or S. S. Mani Bhagavathar was a registered musician at Tiruchirappalli All India Radio broadcast station. He also functioned as a teacher in Kalakshetra. He accompanied Papanasam Sivan and Madurai Srirangam Aiyangar in their music concerts. He also accompanied Kothamangalam Subbu in his Katha Kalakshepams (musical discourses).

== Film career ==
=== As a singer ===
S. S. Mani worked in the music group at Gemini Studios. During this time he sang the first song Ananda Nadamidum Paathan in the raga Kethaara Gowlai for the film Nandanar. He accompanied Kothamangalam Subbu and M. D. Parthasarathy in another song Vara Vara Kettupochu for the same film. He sang a virutham Annaiyum Thanthaiyumaagum for the film Avvaiyar. He accompanied M. D. Parthasarathy in the song Aathoram Kodikaalaam for the film Chandralekha. He also lent his voice to T.E.Varadan in the 1947 film Kannika.

=== As an actor ===
He featured as Hinduism deity Krishna in the 1934 film Pavalakkodi. He also featured in supporting roles in Naveena Sadaram (1935) and Krishnan Thoothu (1940).

== Family ==
Music director S. V. Venkatraman is his brother-in-law (sister's husband). Venkatraman is a cousin of Kothamangalam Seenu. Mani's wife is a niece of Kothamangalam Subbu (his father's younger brother's daughter). Thus, Kothamangalam Subbu and Kothamangalam Seenu became relatives through S. S. Mani.

== A forgotten man ==
Film historian Randor Guy writing in his article reviewing the film Kannika 1947, said "Mani was Papanasam Sivan's nephew and assisted him in his films. He also sang songs that were played against the credit titles. Sadly, Mani is hardly remembered today."

== Bibliography ==
- "Post by Srinivasan Subbu". Facebook., son of Kothamangalam Subbu (in Tamil)
