= Papanasam Sivan =

Indian composer of Carnatic music

Background information
- Also known as: Ramaiah
- Born: Ramasarman; 26 September 1890; Polagam, Tanjore District (Madras Presidency), British India (now Nagapattinam district, Tamil Nadu, India)
- Died: 1 October 1973 (aged 83)
- Genre: Carnatic music
- Occupations: singer, composer
Papanasam Sivan
- Relatives: V. N. Janaki (niece); M. G. Ramachandran (nephew-in-law)

Paapanaasam Raamayya Sivan (26 September 1890 – 1 October 1973) was an Indian composer of Carnatic music and a singer. He was awarded the Madras Music Academy's Sangeetha Kalanidhi in 1971. He was also a film score composer in Kannada and Tamil cinema in the 1930s and 1940s.

Sivan was also known as Tamil Thyaagaraja. Using Classical South Indian music as a base, Sivan created compositions popularised by M. K. Thyagaraja Bhagavathar, D. K. Pattammal, and M. S. Subbulakshmi.

In 1962, he was awarded the Sangeet Natak Akademi Fellowship conferred by Sangeet Natak Akademi, India's National Academy for Music, Dance and Drama.

== Life ==
Sivan's early years were spent in the Travancore area of Kerala. He was born at Polagam village in the district of Thanjavur, which was home to the musical trinity of Carnatic music. His given name was Ramaiya. In 1897, when he was 7, his father died. His mother Yogambal, along with her sons, left Thanjavur and moved to Travancore (now Thiruvananthapuram) in 1899 to seek the aid of his uncle. In Thiruvananthapuram, he learned Malayalam and later joined the Maharaja Sanskrit College and obtained a degree in grammar.

Ramaiya was very religious, and became even more so with the death of his mother Yogambal in 1910, when he was 20. He wandered from place to place visiting temples and singing devotional songs. He used to be an active participant in the devotional music sessions at the home of Neelakandasivan in Thiruvananthapuram where he learned many of Neelakandasivan's composition. In this period he went regularly to the temple at Papanasam, where he would smear bhasma all over his body. Hence people first began to refer him as Papanasam Sivan.

He took his first music lessons from Noorani Mahadeva Bhagavatar, son of Parameswara Bhagavatar. Later, he became the disciple of Konerirajapuram Vaidyanatha Ayyar, a well-known musician.

He was most interested in the devotional aspect of music. He preferred to sing devotional songs and encouraged other singers to take part in sessions of devotional music with him. He was a regular performer in the main temple festivals in South India with his devotional songs.

He received the President Award in 1962, and in 1969 he received the Sangeetha Kalasikhamani Award bestowed on him by "The Indian Fine Arts Society, Chennai". He was conferred the Sangita Kalanidhi in 1971.

D K Pattammal and D K Jayaraman, the sister-brother duo who were both awarded Sangeeta Kalanidhi, were his disciples. He taught Pattammal many kritis, and she also sang many of Sivan's compositions for films.

== Family ==
Papanasam Sivan had an elder brother P. Rajagopal Iyer, whose daughter, V. N. Janaki, was an actress who would later serve as the Chief Minister of Tamil Nadu during 7-30 January 1988.

He had four children, 2 sons and 2 daughters namely P.S. Kirthivasan, P.S Ramadas, Smt. Neela Ramamurthy and Smt. Rukmini Ramani. Sivan started conducting bhajanai in 1934. After his death, his daughter Rukmini Ramani (b 1939), an accomplished singer herself, and her son Ashok Ramani have carried on the bhajanai tradition.

== Filmography ==
Year	Title	Role	Director
1934	Pavalakkodi	Music composer	K. Subramanyam
1934	Sita Kalyanam	Music composer & lyricist	Baburao Pendharkar and K. Ramnoth
1935	Naveena Sadaram	Music composer & lyricist	K. Subramanyam
1936	Naveena Sarangadhara	Music composer & lyricist	K. Subramanyam
1936	Kuchela	Actor (as Kuchela), music composer & lyricist	K. Subramanyam
1937	Chinthamani	Music composer	Y. V. Rao
1938	Sevasadanam	Music composer	K. Subramanyam
1938	Yayathi	Music composer & lyricist	Manik Lal Tandon
1939	Mathru Bhoomi	Music composer	H. M. Reddy
1943	Sivakavi	Music composer (with G. Ramanathan) & lyricist	S. M. Sriramulu Naidu
1944	Haridas	Music composer (with G. Ramanathan) & lyricist	Sundar Rao Nadkarni
1947	Pankajavalli	Music composer & lyricist	S. Soundararajan Ayyangar
1947	Kannika	Lyricist (music by A. V. Natarajan	S. M. Sriramulu Naidu
1948	Bilhana	Music composer	B. N. Rao
1949	Natyarani	Music composer & lyricist (with S. Rajaram)	B. N. Rao
1957	Ambikapathy	??	P. Neelakantan

== Compositions ==
Composition	Raga	Tala	Type	Language	Other Info
Abayaambikaaramani	sankarabharanam				
Adimalarinaiyallaal	pharaju				
Amba Nee irangayenil	Atana	Adi			
Ambikaye	Kharaharapriya	Adi	Varnam	Tamil	
Andavane	Shanmukhapriya				
Alavillaiye	mukhaari				
Anbilaiye	kamaas				
Balakrishna	Dhanyasi				–
Candra kalaavadamsam	sankarabharanam				
Chittham Iranga	shahana	'Misra Chapu'			
Cittam magizhvittidudu	bilahari				
Dasarataatmajam	Poorvi Kalyani				
Dayavillaya Dayalo	Kharaharapriya				
Devi paadam paninden	Hanumatodi				
Devi Neeye Thunai	Keeravani				
Dharma samvarttani taaye	Nata				
Durgaalakshmi saraswati	arabhi, yamunaa kalyaani				
Eesane inda	chakravakam				
Enadhu Manam	Harikambhoji				
Enda vidamum	mukhaari				
Ennatavam seydane yesodaa	kaapi	Adi		Tamil	
Gangaiyani	hanumatodi				
Gajavadana karunaa	shree ranjani	Adi			
Gowri Manohara Karunakara	gowrimanohari				
Guruvaayoorappa	Chakravakam (raga)				
Ihapara menumeru	simhendramadhyamam				
Inbamenbadilaiye	Kanada				
Kaana kan kodi	kambhoji				
Kaanarasamudan	begada				
Kaartikeya gaangeya	hanumatodi				
Kaa vaa vaa	Varaali	'adi'			
Kadaikkan nokki	hanumatodi				
Kadaikkan paarvaiyadu	kamaas				
Kali teerumo	hanumatodi				
Kallaada ezhaiyallavo	saveri				
Kanindarul purindaal	kalyani			'Tamil'	
Kanmana murugacceyya	Surutti				
Kannan madhura idhazhai	Bhimpalas			'Tamil'	
Kapali	mohanam				
Karpagaambike	bilahari				
Karpagaambikai Nee Allavo	Behag				
Karpagame	Madhyamavati				
Karunai Varumo Enrenginen	Charukesi	'Adi'	'Carnatic'	'Tamil'	
Ksheera Saagara Sayee	Purvi Kalyani				
Kumaran taal	yadukula kaambhoji				
Kunran kudi	hanumatodi				
Maa ramanan	hindolam				
Maal marugaa	Vasantha				
Mahalakshmi Jaganmathaa	Sankarabharanam	Misra Chapu			
Mahaaprabo shree	arabhi				
Malarinai tunaiye	Reetigowla			'Tamil'	
Maname kanamum					
Mariyaadai taano	dhanyasi				
Marundalittarul	gowla				
Mayil vAhanA –	Mohanam	Adi		Tamil	
Mulaadhaara murthe	hamsadhvani			Tamil	
Naamamuravu	Darbar				
Naan oru vilayaattu bommaiyaa	navarasa kannada				
Naaraayana divya naamam	mohanam				
Nee arul puriya vendum	keeravani				
Nee gadiyaladu	bhairavi				
Neeyallavo	kamavardani				
Nekk-urugi	abhogi				
Ninai maname	anandabhairavi				
Paadamalare tanycam	kedaram				
Paamalai inai undo	harikambhoji				
Paarvati naayakane	shanmukhapriya	Adi			
Padamalare gaiyena	mayamalavagowla				
Padumaabhan marugaa	nagasvaravali				
Paraamukham enaiyaa	kharaharapriya				
Paraashakti jananee	hamsadhvani				
Paraatpara	vachaspati	Deshadi			
Parpala porpani (kanni)	kamaas				
Patita paavana raama	hanumatodi				
Piravaa varam	latangi				
Piraviyadanaar	sahana				
Raadhaa mukhakamala	hindustani kapi				
Raagagopaala devaadi devane	hanumatodi				
Raamam bhajata	shree				
Saamagaana lolane	hindolam				
Saamaja vara gamana	madhyamavati				
Saa sapaa nabonipaa	hamsadhvani				
Sada siva kumara	Shuddha Saveri				
Senthil aandavan	Kharaharapriya	roopaka	Kriti	Tamil	
Sharanam ayyappaa	mukhaari				
Sharavana bhava guhane	madhyamavati				
Sharavana Bhava Enum	Shanmugapriya				
Singara velavan vandhan	Anandabhairavi	Adi	Keerthanam	Tamil	
Sivagangaa nagara	Punnagavarali				
Sivakaama sundaree jagadamba	mukhaari				
Sivakaama sundaree jagadamba	Surutti				
Shree ganapatiye	deva manohari				
Shree shrI vallI dEva sEnApatE	Natabhairavi				
Shree maadhavaa	Behag				
Sreenivaasa tava	kharaharapriya				
Shreenivaasa tiruvenkata	hamsanandi	'Adi'			
Shree shhanmukam	bhairavi				
Shree vaataapi ganapatiye	sahana				
Sikkal meviya	kambhoji				
Sollu paapaa (paapaa kanni)	mukhaari				
Sopana Vazhvil Sivakavi	mukhaari				
Sree valli deva sena pathe	Natabhairavi				
Swaamy sharanam	anandabhairavi				
Swami Nan Undran	Nattakurinji	'Adi'			
Swaami unran caranam	bilahari				
, Swamikku Sari Evare	Kedaragaula				
Taamasam en swaamy	hanumatodi				
Taaye ezhaipaal	bhairavi				
Tanigai valar	todi				
Tattvamariya taramaa	Reetigowla				
Tinameede natriname	bhupalam				
Tirukkumaranaa yavadarittaar	sankarabharanam				
Tiruvalar mayilaiyun (kanni)	kamaas				
Tiruvazhundoor vaazh	dhanyasi				
Tunai purindarul	shuddha hindolam				
Unadu dayai enai	kamavardani				
Undenru urudi	harikambhoji				
Undu kuladeivaraaman	hanumatodi				
Unnaiyalla vere gatiyillai	Kalyani	'Adi'			
Unnaittudikka	kuntala varaali				
Un paadame	Punnagavarali				
Vaanor vanangu	anandabhairavi				
Vandadellaam varattum	huseni				
Vaayu Kumaaran	kalyani				
Swami Nan Undan Adimai	Nattakurinji				
Shri Ganesha Charanam	Tilang	'Adi'			

== See also ==
- List of Carnatic composers
