= M. K. Thyagaraja Bhagavathar =

Indian actor and carnatic singer (1910-1959)

Mayavaram Krishnasamy Thiyagaraja Bhagavathar
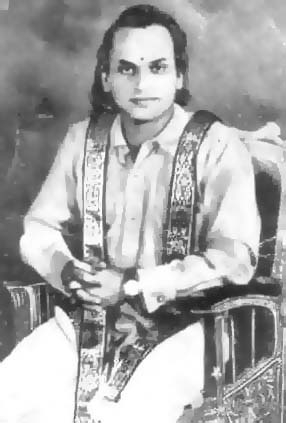
- Bhagavathar in an undated photograph
- Born: Mayavaram Krishnasamy Thiyagaraja Bhagavathar; 1 March 1910; Mayavaram, Tanjore district, Madras Presidency, British Raj (present-day Mayiladuthurai, Mayiladuthurai district, Tamil Nadu, India)
- Died: 1 November 1959 (aged 49); Madras, Madras State, India (present-day Chennai, Tamil Nadu, India)
- Occupations: Actor; Carnatic singer
- Years active: 1934–1960
- Spouse: Kamalam
- Children: 3

Mayavaram Krishnasamy Thiyagaraja Bhagavathar (1 March 1910 – 1 November 1959), also known by his initials M. K. T., was an Indian actor and carnatic singer. Critics and film historians acknowledge Bhagavathar as the first superstar of Tamil cinema. Bhagavathar was born in the town of Mayiladuthurai in then-Tanjore district of the Madras Presidency, British Raj. He started his career as a classical singer and stage artist in the late 1920s. In 1934, he made his debut in films with the hit movie Pavalakkodi. From 1934 to 1960, Bhagavathar acted in 14 films of which 10 were box-office hits. Bhagavathar's 1944 film Haridas ran for three consecutive years at Broadway Theatre in Madras (now Chennai) and created the record for the longest continuous run at a single theatre.

Bhagavathar was arrested in 1944 as one of the main suspects in the Lakshmikanthan murder case and spent three years in prison before being released in 1947 after a Judicial Committee of the Privy Council verdict came in his favor. Bhagavathar's career declined after his arrest. Although he did continue to act in Tamil films after his release from prison, none of them did well. Bhagavathar died of complications from ayurvedic medication at the age of 49 on 1 November 1959. Bhagavathar was acclaimed for his powerful, melodious voice and the ease with which he could sing high-pitch notes.

== Early life ==
Bhagavathar was born Thiyagaraja in Mayiladuthurai (then known as Mayavaram), Tanjore District on 1 March 1910, the eldest son of Krishnasamy Aachari, a goldsmith Vishwakarma. A few years after his birth, the family moved to Tiruchirappalli (then known as Trichinopoly), where Thyagaraja was admitted in a local school.

Right from his childhood, Thyagaraja neglected his studies and desired to become a singer instead. According to a popular anecdote, Thyagaraja once ran away from home after being reprimanded by his father for his decision to become a singer, as singing was not considered to be an honorable profession in the conservative Indian society of the early 20th century. Krishnasamy Aachary, eventually, found his son in the Telugu-speaking town of Kadapa as he was singing to a large group of admiring listeners. Krishnasamy Aachary relented and encouraged his son to hone his skills. Soon, Thyagaraja began to sing bhajans.

== Career ==
=== Early singing and stage career ===
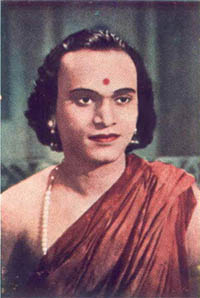
M. K. T. in the film Ambikapathy.

F. G. Natesa Iyer, a railway officer with South Indian Railways, Trichy and the founder of an amateur theatre group, Rasika Ranjana Sabha, is credited with introducing Thyagaraja to the stage. One story is that he heard Thyagaja singing at a bhajan. Impressed with his talent, F. G. Natesa Iyer offered him the role of Lohitadasa in his play Harischandra, with the permission of Thyagaraja's father. Thyagaraja, who was ten at the time, agreed, and the play was a success. He also started training under the guidance of theatre veterans at that time in Trichy. However, Thyagaraja concentrated more on singing than acting and took a six-year training in Carnatic music from Madurai Ponnu Iyengar, an acclaimed violinist.

=== Early films ===
In 1934, businessmen Lakshmana Chettiar and Alagappa Chettiar and film director K. Subramaniam happened to watch a Hindu mythological play called "Pavalakkodi" in which Bhagavathar played the lead role of Arjuna. Thoroughly impressed with the performance, Chettiar planned to produce a movie based on the same story with Bhagavathar playing the lead role. The film was shot in Adyar and was a success. It helped launch Bhagavathar's career in films.

Bhagavathar's second film Naveena Sarangadhara (1935) was again directed by K. Subramaniam and was based on a play called Sarangadhara. Bagavathar's next film was his first own production film under the banner Trichy Thyagaraja Films, "Sathyaseelan" (1936). The film had the novel feature of two Bagavathars appearing on the same frame, though it was not strictly a film with Bagavathar playing a double role. Bagavathar, apart from playing Sathyaseelan, also briefly appears as a court singer himself in the film.

=== Rise to stardom 1937–1944 ===
In 1937, Bhagavathar was cast in role of Bilwamangal in the film Chintamani directed by Y. V. Rao. Chintamani was record-breaking success and became the first Tamil film to run continuously for a year. Bhagavathar's songs in the movie were especially popular. The Tamil writer Kalki Krishnamurthy wrote that the film has made such an impact on the viewers that housewives would sing the song Mayaprapanchattil from the movie while preparing coffee in the morning and her husband would sing Rathey unakku kobam in response. However, the songs that were featured in the gramophone records produced by Saraswathi Stores were not sung by Bhagavathar as he did not have any business understanding with the company. With the profits obtained from the movie, the owners of Rayal Talkies constructed a theatre in Madurai and named it Chintamani.

The very same year, Bhagavathar was offered the title role in the film Ambikapathy made by the American film director Ellis R. Dungan. The film was Bhagavathar's second consecutive hit in the year and broke records set by Chintamani. Dungan was, however, heavily criticised by the conservative Hindu society for introducing controversially intimate scenes between Bhagavathar and the heroine Santhanalakshmi. Bhagavathar played the role of Saivite saint Thiruneelakanta Nayanar in the 1939 movie Thiruneelakantar.

=== Singing ===
Most of M.K.T.'s songs were devotional with a South Indian classical base. Along with lyricist Papanasam Sivan, M.K.T. composed many songs, including "Unai Alaal", "Neelakanta", "Amba Manam Kanindhu", "Soppana Vazhvil Makizhndu", "Maraivaai pudhaitha Odu", "Gnana Kann", "Sathva Guna Bodhan", "Rajan Maharajan", "Krishna Mukunda Murari", "Naatiya Kalaiye", "Radhe Unaku Kobam Aagadadi", "Vasantha Ruthu", and many others.

=== Acting ===
M.K.T. made his début in the 1934 film Pavalakodi; in all, he appeared in 14 movies before he died. Most of his films were record-breakers. Thiruneelakandar, Ambikapathi, Chintamani were among the first highly successful Tamil films. Haridas, released in 1944, ran continuously for three years at the Chennai Broadway Theatre. It even witnessed three Deepavali festivals of 1944, 1945 and 1946.

Between 1934 and 1944, Bhagavathar performed in 9 films, all hits, in Pavalakodi, Sarangadara (1935), Sathyaseelan (1936), Chintamani and Ambikapathi (both 1937), Thiruneelakantar (1939), Ashok Kumar (1941), Sivakavi (1942), and Haridas. After his arrest and subsequent release, his only successful film was Amarakavi and Shyamala.

== Incarceration ==
In 1944, MKT, actor N. S. Krishnan, and Coimbatore-based movie studio owner Sriramlu Naidu were charged in the murder of Lakshmikanthan; M.K.T. was acquitted and released in April 1947. The initial defense team, which included the future governor general Rajagopalachari, was not able to get him out of jail despite very weak evidence. It was a lawyer named Ethiraj who successfully got him acquitted. Prior to his arrest, he was signed up to act in 12 more films and the few movies he did make after his release were unsuccessful. People were not interested in watching someone who had been to jail on screen. This was sharp contrast to NSK, who was already arrested in the same case as Superstar. But NSK was able to reclaim his spot as a leading hero. Nevertheless, MKT still drew huge crowds at his concerts. He had lost almost all his wealth in his case defense. He was associated with Indian National Congress initially, after his time in prison he stayed away from politics.

== Final years and death ==
MKT turned more towards temples and developed a philosophical attitude towards the end of his life. He undertook journeys to many pilgrimage centres. He lost interest in wealth and popularity.

After 1955, he visited many temples in South India including Dharmapura Adheenam and other places such as Pandharpur etc., with one of his best friends, Mr. A. Nagarathnam, a school teacher from Erode and who also learnt carnatic music from Alathur Brothers along with MKT. He visited Ramakrishna Tapovanam near Trichy and stayed there for well over a month. He visited Tiruvannamalai and another place called Tirumoolaranyam near Tiruvannamalai and stayed in an ashram for a few days.

MKT also suffered from diabetes and used take the insulin injection himself in the middle of concerts in the last years of his life.

During the closing days of his life, Bagavathar suffered from high blood pressure and acute diabetes. Only ten days before his demise, he gave a concert at Pollachi. At the end of the concert, a person offered him some Ayurvedic tonic to cure the diabetics. Instead of providing relief, the tonic aggravated the condition so severely that he had to be taken to Madras immediately where he was admitted to the General Hospital on 22 October 1959. He underwent treatment for a week, but died on 1 November 1959 at about 6.20 p.m.

His body was taken to Trichy and was buried in Sangiliyandapuram, a small village in the outskirts of Trichy. His funeral procession started in the cantonment from his house at about 4.30 p.m. and took about 4 hours to reach the burial ground due to the gathering of an overwhelming crowd. M. K. Thyagaraja Bhagavathar was laid to rest in Sangiliyandapuram, Tiruchirappalli, Tamil Nadu, alongside his parents and other members of the Viswakarma community. Contrary to some reports, his burial site is not neglected. It has been consistently maintained by his family and community members, who have preserved the dignity of the site through regular upkeep and reverence.

In 2019, the Tamil Nadu government announced a ₹50 lakh manimandapam (memorial hall) project to honor Bhagavathar’s legacy. However, the memorial was never constructed, and the initiative has been criticized as a failed or mismanaged effort. Despite this, the Viswakarma community continues to honor Bhagavathar’s contributions to Tamil cinema and Carnatic music through grassroots efforts and cultural remembrance.

== Philanthropy ==
He has helped many people without publicity. It was a custom those days to arrange music concerts in family functions like weddings etc. Bhagavathar would sing without any remuneration in family functions of those who helped him to come up in life. When World War II started, the British colonial government in India asked him to stage dramas and donate the collections for the Red Cross. He agreed and donated an impressive amount. When the war was over, the British government, as a gesture of gratitude, offered to honour him with the title Divan Bahadur. But he politely declined it saying he was only helping a humanitarian cause and did not expect to be rewarded.

== Legacy ==
During the Second World War, at the request of the Governor of Madras, Arthur Oswald James Hope, Bhagavathar organised concerts and plays to raise money for the British war effort. The Governor recognised his contributions by offering him a Diwan Bahadur title which Bhagavathar declined.

Bhagavathar was the first super star in Tamil film industry, himself along with Chinnappa started the culture of dual stars ruling the Tamil industry who attained demigod status in Tamil Nadu.

== In popular culture ==
In Selvamani Selvaraj's period crime drama Kaantha (2025) starring Dulquer Salmaan, the character of Thiruchengode Kalidasa Mahadevan, portrayed by Dulquer Salmaan, was inspired by M.K.T. and draws from aspects of his professional and personal life. However, the makers of Kaantha later clarified that the film is a fictionalized work inspired by M.K.T.’s life.

== Filmography ==
Year	Title	Role	Note
1934	Pavalakkodi	Arjuna	
1936	Naveena Sarangadhara	Sarangadharan	
1936	Sathyaseelan	Sathyaseelan	Bhagavathar first and lastly did as dual role and also producer
1937	Chintamani	Bilwamangal	
1937	Ambikapathy	Ambikapathy	
1939	Thiruneelakantar	Thiruneelakanta Nayanar	Also producer
1941	Ashok Kumar	Gunalan	
1943	Sivakavi	Poyyamozhi Pulavar/Ambalatharasan	
1944	Haridas	Haridas	
1948	Raja Mukthi	Rajendravarman	
1952	Amarakavi	Amarakavi	
1952	Shyamala	Shyamala	
1957	Pudhu Vazhvu	Vaikuntam	Also producer and director
1960	Sivagami	M. K. Thyagaraja Bhagavathar	Posthumous release
