= List of Tamil films of the 1930s =

A list of the films produced in the Tamil language film industry in India in the 1930s:

== 1931 ==
Title	Director	Production	Music	Cast
Kalidas	H. M. Reddy	Ardeshir Irani	Madhurakavi Bhaskara Das	T. P. Rajalakshmi, P. G. Venkatesan, L. Vrasad

== 1932 ==
Title	Director	Production	Music	Cast
Harichandra (Sampoorna Harichandra)	Sarvottam Badami, T. C. Vadivelu Naicker	Sagar Film Company; Chimanlal Desai	Raja Chandrasekar	V. S Sunderasa Iyer, D. R. Muthulakshmi, T. P. Rajalakshmi
Kalava (Galavarishi)	P. B. Rangachari	Sagar Film Company	G. Sundara Bhagavathar	P. B. Rangachari, V. S. Sunderasa Iyer, T. R. Muthulakshmi
Paarijaatha Pushpaha ragam	P. K. Raja Sandow	Imperial Film Company		R. Nagendra Rao, K. T. Rukmani, Leela, Narasmimma Rao
Ramayanam		East India Film Company		T. P. Rajalakshmi, T. S. Mani

== 1933 ==
Title	Director	Production	Music	Cast
Kovalan		Imperial Films		R. Nagendra Rao, T. P. Rajalakshmi, K. T. Rukmani, Leela
Nanthanar		New Theatres		Subbaiah Thevar, Angamuthu
Prahalada_(film)		New Theatres, East India Company		
Satyavan_Savithri				M. R. Krishnamurthi, T. S. Mani, T. P. Rajalakshmi
Valli	P.V. Rao	National Movietone		T. S. Santhanam, Pankajam
Valli Thirumanam	P. V. Rao	Pioneer Films; Samikannu Vincent	Lyricist: Baskaradas	C. M. Duraisamy, T. V. Sundaram, T. P. Rajalakshmi

== 1934 ==
Title	Director	Production	Music	Cast
Bama Vijayam	Manik Lal Tandon	Pioneer Films	K. Tyagaraja Desigar	M. R. Krishhnamurthi, G. N. Balasubramaniam, P. S. Rathna Bai, P. S. Saraswathi Bai, M. S. Murugesan, K. S. Angamuthu
Dasavathaaram		Jayavani Film Company		Saradamal, Mani
Draupadhi Vastrapaharanam	R. Padmanaban	Angel Films		V. A. Chellappa, T. S. Vasudeva Pillai, C. S. Ramanna, C. V. V. Panthulu, T. P. Rajalakshmi, P. S. Sivabagyam
Draupadhi Vastrapaharanam	R. Prakash	A. Narayanan, Sreenivas Cinetone		T. S. Sandhanam, K. R. Saradhambal P.S. Srinivasa Rao, Sirukalathur Sama T. S. Krishnaveni
Pavalakkodi	K. Subramanyam	Al. Rm. Alagappa Chettiar, Meenakshi Cinetone	Papanasam Sivan	M. K. Thyagaraja Bhagavathar, S. D. Subbulakshmi, Sundarambal, S. S. Mani Bhagavathar
Sakkubai	Sundar Rao Nadkarni	Paruva Pictures		Madurai Asari, K. R. Saradhambal
Sakuntala	P. V. Rao	Pioneer Films		P. S. Velu Nair, M. S. Murugesan, L. Narayanarao, T. M. Ramasamy, T. S. Velammal, Santhadevi
Sangeetha Lava Kusa	S. Soundararajan (Tamil Nadu Talkies)	S. Soundararajan & Kv. Al. Rm. Alagappa Chettiar	Harikesanallur Muthiah Bhagavatar	Vidvan Srinivasan, Seetha Narayanan, Lakshmi
Sathi Sulochana	Pammal Sambandha Mudaliar	Babulal Sowkani, Bharath Lakshmi Pictures	Janarthanam	M. G. Nataraja Pillai, T. N. Nataraja Pillai, A. R. Sarangapani, P. Subbaya Thevar, Nagarkovil Sundarambal, T. K. Rukmani, Sulochana
Sita Kalyanam	Baburao Phendharkar	Prabhat Film Company	Papanasam Sivan, A. N. Kalyanasundaram	S. Rajam, G. K. Seshagiri, S. Balachander, V. Sundaram Iyer, S. Jayalakshmi
Seetha Vanavaasam		B. M. Khemka, East India Films		Nott Annaji Rao, Trichur Rukmini
Sri Krishnaleela	P. V. Rao	Angel Films		C. S. Jayaraman, C. S. Ramanna, C. V. V Panthulu, M. S. Muthukrishnan, P. S. Sivabagyam, K. S. Rajambal
Srinivaasa Kalyaanam	A. Narayanan	Srinivasa Cinetone, A. Narayanan	C. R. S. Murthy	P. S. Srinivasa Rao, Serukulathur Sama, R. B. Lakshmi Devi, P. S. Kamalaveni

== 1935 ==
Title	Director	Production	Music	Cast
Alli Arjuna		A. V. Meiyappan, Saraswathi Sound Productions		Abdul Khadar, K. S. Ananda Narayana Iyer, K. R. Kanthimathi Bai, T. S. Bhavani Bai, L. Narayana Rao
Athiroopa Amaravathi	C. V. Raman	Sundaram Talkies		Sivakozhundu, P. M. Sundara Bashyam, K. K. Thangavelu, T. S. Velammal, Ranganayaki
Bhakta Nandanar	Manik Lal Tandon	Kishinchand Chellaram, Hassandas Classical Talkies		K. B. Sundarambal, Maharajapuram Viswanatha Iyer
Baktha Ramadas	Murugadasa	Parameswari Sound Pictures		Nawab T. S. Rajamanikkam Pillai, K. Sarangapani, M. N. Nambiar, T. S. Kalyanam
Bhaktha Dhuruvan	P .V. Rao	Angel Films	C. S. Jayaraman	C. S. Gopala Krishnan, C. S. Samanna, P. S. Sivabagyam, Sivaramalingam Pillai, S. R. Gnanakibai, C. S. Jayaraman
Chandrasaena	V. Shantaram	Prabhat Film Company		Seshadri Sundarrajan, P. S. Srinivasan, K. Natarajan, T. T. Kanagam, S. Pankajam
Dumbachary	Manik Lal Tandon	Pioneer Film Company, Variety Hall Talkies		M. R. Krishnamoorthi, C. S. Samanna, M. S. Ragavan, P. S. Rathna Bai, P. S. Saraswathi Bai, M. S. Murugesan
Dhuruvaa Sarithram		Pioneer Film Company, Variety Hall Talkies		M. S. Thangappa, V. Swaminathan, R. B. Lakshmi Devi, P. S. Gnanaambal
Gnanasounthari	Raja Chandrasekar	Srinivasa Cinetone and Kovai Sakuntala Films Ltd	Raa. ki. Narayanan (Udumalai) (Dialogues and lyrics)	S. Sarojinidevi (Gnanasoundari); S. Anjugam (Lenal); C. V. V. Panthulu (Pilendran); P. S. Srinivas (Dharmaraja) and M. N. Swamy (Simiyon)
Gopalakrishna		S. T. R. Pictures		S. Rajam, Gowri
Harichandra	Prafula Ghosh			T. P. Rajalakshmi, V. A. Chellappa, K. T. Rukumani, M. S. Ramachandran Iyer
Kausalya		South India Film Corporation		P. S. V. Iyer, R. Chellam
Kulepakaavali	S. Soundararajan	S. Soundararajan, Tamil Nadu Talkies		V. A. Chellappa, M. S. Ramachandran, T. P. Rajalakshmi, Rajeswari, Rani Bala
Lalithangi		Royal Talkies		T. P. Rajalakshmi, V. A. Chellappa, T. V. Sundaram, M. S. Ramachandran Iyer, Kamala
Lanka Dhakanam		Chellam Talkies		A. Rangasami Naidu, M. S. Gnanambal
Maayaa Bazaar	R. Padmanaban			Serukulathur Sama, Vidwan Seenivasan, S. G. Chellapa Iyer, M. S. Vijayal, V. Rajam, Bala Mani, Kamatchi
Markandeya	Murugadasa, K. Ramnoth	M. T. Rajan, Vel Pictures		V. N. Sundaram, Rajapalayam Kuzhandaivelu Bhagavathar, K. B. Srinivasan, Lady Bhagavathar M. S. Kanna Bai, S. N. Kannamani
Menaka	P. K. Raja Sandow	M. Somasundaram & S. K. Mohideen, Sri Shanmuganandha Talkies (later Jupiter Pictures)	T. K. Muthuswamy	T. K. Shanmugam, T. K. Baghavathi, T. K. Sankaran, T. K. Muthurswamy, K. T. Rukmini, M. S. Vijayal, N. S. Krishnan, K. R. Ramasamy, Friend Ramasamy, T. N. Sivadhanu
Mohini Rukmangadha	S. Soundararajan	S. Soundararajan, Tamil Nadu Talkies	K. V. Santhanakrishna Naidu	P. B. Rangachari, T. S. Krishnasamy Iyengar, Vidhwan Seenivasan, V. Nataraja Iyer, M. S. Sarojini, M. S. Vijayal, K. R. Saradhambal, D. Susheela Devi
Nala Thamayanthi	Prem Chethna	Pioneer Film Company		S. V. Venkatraman, Mangal Rajeshwari
Nalla Thangal	P. V. Rao	Angel Films		M. S. Damodar Rao, C. S. Jayaraman, K. R. Kanthimathi Bai, P. S. Sivabagyam
Nalla Thangkaal		Pioneer Film Company		
Naveena Sadaram	K. Subramanyam	K. Subramanyam, Madras United Artists Corporation	Papanasam Sivan	Vidhwan Sankaralingam, G. Pattu Iyer, S. S. Mani Bagavadhar, Kunjidha Padham, S. D. Subbulakshmi, K. K. Parvati Bai, Indubala, M. T. Rajam
Pattinathar	V. S. K. Patham	Lotus Pictures		C. S. Sundara Moorthi Oduvar, K. R. Sarathambal, Kothamangalam Seenu
Poornachandran	D. R. Doss	New Theatres	Nott Annajirao, S. G. Chellapa Iyer	T. P. Rajalakshmi, Nott Annajirao, Rangabashyam, M. Anandaraman, R. V. Lakshmi Devi, P. S. Gnanmbal, M. Radhabai
Radha Kalyanam	C. K. Sachi (C. K. Sathasivan)	Sri Meenakshi Cinetone	Sri Harikesanallur Muthiah Bagavadhar	S. Rajam, M. R. Santhanalakshmi, K. D. Devudu Iyer, T. V. Krishna Moorthy
Raja Bhoja		New Theatres		T. S. Krishnasamy Iyengar, Rajayee
Rajambal	A. Narayanan	Coimbatore Talkies		S. Rajam, P. S. Srinivasa Rao, M. N. Seenivasan, T. S. Krishnasamy Iyengar, K. N. Rajalakshmi
Ratnavali	Prafulla Ghosh	A. V. Meiyappan, Saraswathi Talkie Producing Company		M. R. Krishnamoorthi, P. S. Rathna Bai, P. S. Saraswathi Bai, T. R. A. Mathuram
Sarangadhara	V. S. K. Patham	Lotus Pictures		Kothamangalam Seenu, G. Seenivasan, T. M. Saradhambal
Sathi Akalyaa		Chandra Bharathi Cinetone		
Siruthonda Naayanaar	C. V. Raman	Radha Films, Malik Pictures Corporation		T. K. Sundarappa, Sornambal
Subhadra Parinayam		Pioneer Film Company, Variety Hall Talkies		S. V. Subbaiah Bhagavathar, Bufoon Shanmugam, Karaikudi Ganesh Iyer, Kasi Viswanatha Iyer, Ramasamy Pillai, T. S. Velammal, T. K. Rukmani Ammal,
Thooku Thooki	R. S. Prakash	Royal Talkies		C. V. V. Panthulu, Clown Sundaram, K. T. Rukmani, M. R. Kamalam, Devaki

== 1936 ==
Title	Director	Production	Music	Cast
Ali Badhusha				C. S. Selva Rathnam, Pangajam
Baktha Kuchela	K. Subramanyam	K. Subramanyam, Madras United Artists Corporation		Papanasam Sivan, S. D. Subbulakshmi, G. Pattu Iyer, Baby R. Balasaraswathi Devi
Bama Parinayam	Y. V. Rao	Royal Talkies		Serukulathur Sama, T. P. Rajalakshmi, K . Rangnayagi, Raja Thandapani
Beeshma Prathikgna				
Chandrahasan	Profulla Ghosh			V. N. Sundaram, P. B. Rangachari, M. R. Santhanalakshmi, P. C. Seetharaman, C. S. Saradambal, J. Susheela Devi, M. R. Subramania Mudaliar, K. S. Subramania Iyer, S. Kalyanasundaram Iyer, D. Sundaram Iyer, Master Ramudu, Miss Rajam, P. Ramaiah Sastrigal
Chandrakantha	P. K. Raja Sandow	M. Somasundaram & S. K. Mohideen, Jupiter Pictures		Kali N. Rathnam, P. U. Chinnappa, Aayiram Mugam S. Ramkumar, A. K. Rajalakshmi
Chandramohana or Samooga Thondu	Raja Chandrasekhar			M. K. Radha, T. N. Meenakshi, S. V. Venkatraman
Devadas; Dubbed from Bengali				
Dhara Sasangam	A. Narayanan	A. Narayanan, Sreenivasa Cinetone		
Dharma Pathini				M. S. Ramachandran Iyer, Gomathi, C. S. Samanna
Indra Sabha	A. Narayanan	A. Narayanan, Sreenivasa Cinetone		M. Sachithanandam, J. Susheela, K. Shantha Devi, S. N. Ranga Nathan
Iru Sahodarargal	Ellis R. Dungan	Parameshwar Sound Pictures	Parur S Anantharaman & Gopalaswami	K. P. Kesavan, M. M. Radhabai, M. G. Ramachandran, T. S. Krishnaveni, T. S. Balaiah, P. G. Venkatesan, S. N. Kannamani, S. N. Vijayalakshmi, M. G. Chakrapani
Garuda Garvabhangam	R. Padmanaban	Oriental Films	Chidambaram Vedhanayagam Sharma	M. D. Parthasarathy, M. S. Mohanambal, Serukulathur Sama, Vidwan Srinivasan, T. S. Mani, Vimala, M. D. Subramania Mudaliar.
Kizhattu Mappillai	T. R. Raghunath			
Krishna Arjuna		Royal Talkies		K. V. Srinivasa Bhaghavatar, M. V. Krishnappa, K. Pappa, K . Rangnayagi, P. Janaki Bai
Krishna Narathi or Narada Garva Bangham	R. Prakash			K. V. Vaithyanathan Iyer, N. M. Sundrambal, K. S. Sinivasan, K. S. Kannaya, K . Rangnayagi
Leelavathi Sulochana	P. V. Rao	Angel Films		C. S. Jayaraman, P. S. Govindan, P. S. Sivabhagyam, T. M. Saradambal, S. S. Rajagopalan, K. Mahadevan, Isakki, C. K. Selvambal, K. R. Lakshmi, T. P. Manoji Rao, T. M. Pankajam, M. S. Sundaram, C. D. Janaki
Madayarkalin Santhippu				
Madras Mail	C. M. Trivedi	Mohan Pictures	S. N. Ranganathan	Battling Mani, T. N. Meenakshi, S. R. K. Iyengar, Chellam, S. S. Kokko, Srinivasa Iyengar
Mahathma Kabeerdhas	A. Narayanan	Sundaram Talkies		P. D. V. Krishna, T. S. Velammal, M. R. Raja Rathinam, A. B. Moorthi, L. V. Naidu
Mannarsami				
Manohara				
Meera Bai	A. Narayanan			C. V. V. Panthulu, T.V. Rajsundari Bai, Gopal Rao, Joker Ramudu, K. S. Angamuthu, T. S. Sandhanam
Miss Kamala	T. P. Rajalakshmi	T. P. Rajalakshmi, Sri Rajam Talkies		T. P. Rajalakshmi, T. V. Sundaram, Battling C. S. D. Singh, V. S. Mani, T. P. Rajagopal, Stunt Rajoo
Moondru Muttalkalin Sangeetha Koshti	Aralkar Kabuli Sahib			P. G. Venkatesan, K. R. Saradhambal, K. T. Rukumani
Nalayini	R. Prakash	Sundaram Talkies, Oriental Films		
Naveena Sarangadhara	K. Subramanyam	Murugan Talkies	Papanasam Sivan	M. K. Thyagaraja Bhagavathar, S. D. Subbulakshmi, S. S. Mani Bhagavathar, G. Pattu Iyer, Indubala
Parvathi Kalyanam	B. Y. Aldekar		Matheri Mangalam Nadasa Iyer	P. Sreenivasa Rao, P. K. Durai Sami Desikar, S. P. L. Dhanalakshmi, T. S. Damayanthi
Pathi Bhakthi	B. Y. Aldekar			K. P. Kesavan, K. K. Perumal, M. M. Radha Bai, Kali N. Rathinam, P. R. Mangalam
Pathuga Pattabishekam		Murugadasa, K. Ramnoth & A. K. Shekar, Karthigeya Films		
Pattinathar	Murugadasa (Muthuswami Iyer)	M. T. Rajan, Vel Pictures		M. M. Dandapani Desikar, D. R. Muthulakshmi, Jaya Lakshmi, K. T. Rukumani, V. N. Sundaram
Raja Desingu	Raja Chandrasekhar	Rajeswari Talkies	M. Baluswami	T. K. Sundarappa, V. S. Mani, M. Lakshmi, K. R. Saradambal, Rukmini Devi Arundale
Rukmini Kalyanam	Bhalji Pendharkar			S. Rajam, M. S. Vijayal, Matheri Mangalam Nadasa Iyer, Sreemathi, Panchu Bhaghavatar, Kamala
Sathi Leelavathi	Ellis R. Dungan	Marudachalam Chettiar, Manorama Films	Sundhara Vadhyar	M. K. Radha, M. S. Gnanambal, M. G. Ramachandran, N. S. Krishnan, T. S. Balaiah
Sathyaseelan	B. Sampathkumar	M. K. Thyagaraja Bhagavathar, Trichy Thyagaraja Films	Papanasam Sivan	M. K. Thyagaraja Bhagavathar, M. S. Devasena, M. P. Mohan, G. Padmavathi Bai, T. V. Kanthimathi Bai, N. S. Krishnan, T. A. Madhuram
Seemanthini	Ellis R. Dungan	National Movie Tone	Thiruchi T. V. Nataraja Chariyar	T. P. Rajalakshmi, M. R. Krishnamoorthi, T. P. Rajagopal, M. S. Ramachandra Iyer, M. D. Rajam, Parvathi, K. T. Rukmani Miss. Pattu, T. V. Sundaram, Chinnasama Iyer, Natesa Sastri, Kulathu Mani, Krishna Iyer, Sivarama Iyer, Kalyanam, Seenivasa Rao
Srimath Mahabaratham		S. Soundararajan, Tamil Nadu Talkies		
Srimathi Parinayam				
Usha Kalyanam	K. Subramanyam	Murugan Talkie		M. V. Krishnappa, S. D. Subbulakshmi, C. V. V. Panthulu, G. Pattu Iyer, V. Govindasami, M. S. Pattammal, J. M. Sundaram, S. S. Padmavathi, S. S. Rajamani, K. E. Madhava Iyer, S. Gomathi Bai
Vasantha Sena	P. K. Raja Sandow			V. A. Chellappa, S. P. L. Dhanalakshmi, M. S. Vijayal, N. S. Krishnan, T. A. Madhuram, P. K. Raja Sandow
Veera Abimanyu	Profulla Ghosh	Nagatha		M. R. Krishnamoorthi, T. P. Rajalakshmi, C. S. Mana Singh
Viswamithira	A. Narayanan	A. Narayanan, Sreenivasa Cinetone		M. K. Gopala Iyengar, Rajasundari, T. Duraisami Iyer

== 1937 ==
Title	Director	Production	Music	Cast
Aandal Thirukkalyanam				
Ambikapathy	Ellis R. Dungan	M. S. Thottana Chettiar, Salem Shankar Films	Papanasam Sivan & K. C. Dey	M. K. Thyagaraja Bhagavathar, M. R. Santhanalakshmi, Serukulathur Sama, T. S. Balaiah, N. S. Krishnan, T. A. Madhuram, P. G. Venkatesan, P. B. Ranagachari, P. R. Mangalam, S. S. Raja Mani
Arunagirinathar				
Baktha Arunagiri	S. D. S Yogiyar	S. S. S. Chokkalingam, Mayuraa Films		Thevaram C. Sangkaralingam
Baktha Jeyadev				
Baktha Purantharadoss		Devi Films	Bellave Narahari Shastri	G. Krishnarama Bhagavathar, Tripuramba
Baktha Thulasidas	Raja Chandrasekar	Murugan Talkies	Music: D. K. Jayarama Iyer; Lyrics: Mayavaram Thiyagaraja Mudhaliyar	M. K. Radha, K. B. Sabitha Devi, N. S. Krishnan, T. A. Madhuram, Chellam, T. E. Krishnamachari, Buffoon Sankara Iyer, Angamuthu.
Balamani	T. V. Rao			
Balayogini	K. Subramanyam	K. Subramanyam, Madras United Artists Corporation	Moti Babu & Maruti Seetharammaiah	K. R. Chellam, Baby Saroja, C. V. V. Panthulu, Bharathan, K. B. Vatsal (K. Viswanathan), Baby R. Balasaraswathi Devi, Baby Rukmini, Salem Sundaram
Bhaktha Sri Thyagaraja	Virendra Desai	Sagar Movietone		Vidwan Mathirimangalam Natesa Iyer, Kamala, Seetha, T.P.K. Sastry, C.P.S. Mani Iyer. S.K. Sundaram, 'Gavai' Kalyanam, A. Dhanapal Chettiar, V.B. Srinivasan, 'Baby' Kokila, 'Master' Pranatharthiharan, Padmanabhachar and Rajagopala Iyer.
Basmasura Mohini				
Chintamani	Y. V. Rao	Royal Talkies	Papanasam Sivan	M. K. Thyagaraja Bhagavathar, Serukulathur Sama, K. Aswathamma, Y. V. Rao, L. Narayana Rao
Danger Signal				
Devadas	B. V. Rao	New Theatres		B. V. Rao, G. P. Rajayi, T. S. Krishna Iyengar, S. N. Vijayalakshmi, D. M. Ramasamy Pillai, M. A. Rajamani, Subramani Bhagavathar
Kavirathna Kalidass		M. T. Rajan, Vel Pictures		T. S. Sandhanam
Kowsalya Parinayam	K. Subramanyam	K. Subramanyam, Madras United Artists Corporation		K. N. Rajalakshmi, K. N. Kamalam
Krishna Bhakthi or Bhaktha Jayadevar		Saraswathi Stores, Madras+		Master Krishnan (as Sri Krishnan), Srirangam Venkatarama Bhagavathar (as Jayadevar), Miss Chellam (as Padmavathi - Jayadevar's wife)
Krishna Thulabaram	A. Narayanan	Srinivas Cinetone	S. N. R. Nadham	M. K. Gopal, T . M. Sarathambal, M. R. Subramania Mudaliar, T. S. Ramamani Bai, Puliyoor Doraisamy Iyer, T. S. Krishnaveni, Sundaramurthi Odhuvaar, K. R. Saradhambal
Kutti				
Lakshmi or Harijana Penn	C. V. Raman			
Minnalkodi	K. Amarnath			
Miss Sundari	S. Soundararajan	Tamil Nadu Talkies	Kesi Dey	Battling Mani, P. S. Sivapackiam, V. S. Sundaresa Iyer, Suseela Devi, M. R. Narayanan, Angamuthu, K. S. Sethupathi Pillai, K. S. Rajalakshmi
Minor Rajaamani	P. K. Raja Sandow	M. Somasundaram & S. K. Mohideen, Olymbic Pictures (later Jupiter Pictures)		T. K. Sambangi, Kamalaveni, Kothamangalam Subbu, B. R. Mangalam, Surabi
Mr. Ammanchi	K. Subramanyam	K. Subramanyam, Madras United Artists Corporation		Jolly Kittu Iyer, S. D. Subbulakshmi
Nava Yuvan or Geethaa Saaram	Michael Omalov	Kishinchand Chellaram, Hassandas Classical Talkies		V. V. Sadagopan, Bikshavathi, M. A. Rajamani
Naveena Nirupama		T. R. Sundaram, Modern Theatres		
Naveena Sthree Sakasam				
Padma Jothi	T. R. Sundaram	T. R. Sundaram, Modern Theatres		T. M. Sankaran, M. S. Muthukrishnan, Padma, T. P. Manoj Rao, Ambujam, U. R. Jeevarathinam
Pakka Rowdy	K. Amarnath			
Pakka Thirudan				
Raja Bakthi	Sundar Rao Nadkarni	V. C. Gopalratnam, Chellam Talkies		B. R. Panthulu, P. S. Rathnabai, P. S. Saraswatibai, Pattabiraman, R. B. Lakshmidevi
Raja Mohan	Prem Chethna	National Movietone		
Rajasekaran or Emandha Sonagiri	T. Prakash	Madurai Meenakshi Cinetone	Rajam Pushpavanam	M. R. Radha, E. R. Sahadevan, Aathmanathan, Janakam, Kanakam
Samundeeswari				
Sathi Ahalya	T. R. Sundaram	T. R. Sundaram, Modern Theatres	R. Balusami	K. Thavamani Devi, S. D. Subbaiah, T. M. Sankaran
Sathi Anusuya	Prem Chethna	Kovai Premier Cinetone Studios	G. Govindarajulu Naidu	
Sethu Bandhanam & Aasai	R. Padmanaban	Oriental Films	M. D. Parthasarathy	P. B. Rangachari, Nott Annaji Rao, M. D. Parthasarathy, M. S. Mohanambal, M. A. Sandow, Kulathu Mani, M. R. Subramaniam, T. K. Kannammal, K. S. Angamuthu, Bhagirathi
Sundaramurthi Nayanar	Murugadasa	Murugadasa, K. Ramnoth & A. K. Shekar, Karthigeya Films		P. P. Rangachari, T. R. Subbulakshmi, V. N. Sundaram, Chandra
Vallala Maharaja		M. T. Rajan, Vel Pictures		
Vikrama Stri Sahasam	A. Narayanan	A. Narayanan & T. C. Vadivelu Naicker, Srinivasa Cinetone		T. K. Sundarappa, Puliyur Duraiswami Ayya, Papa Lakshmikantham, T.K. Rukmini, Satchithanandam, M. K. Gopalan, T. R. Krishnaveni, Master Srinivas, Lazar M. R. Subramanyam, Ramudu Iyer, P.D. Kumarasami Pillai, S. Kannammal
Vipranarayana; Alternate name: Thondaradipodi Azhvar	K. Ranga Rao	Madras Sound Studios	Ramanatha Iyer, Mahadevan (Lyrics: Yanai Vaidyanatha Iyer)	Rajamadam G. Sundara Bhagavathar, Joker Ramudu, M. S. Ragavam, K. R. Rao, Thiruchur Premavathi, Mathuram, Meenakshi, Suryakumari
Virada Parvam	A. Narayanan	A. Narayanan, Srinivasa Cinetone		

== 1938 ==
Title	Director	Production	Music	Cast
Anaadhai Penn	Ragupathy S. Prakasam (R. Prakash)	M. Somasundaram & S. K. Mohideen, Jupiter Pictures		M. K. Radha, T. A. Sundarambal, P. U. Chinnappa, S. M. Subramaniam (Kothamangalam Subbu), L. Narayan Rao, T. S. Krishnaveni, P. R. Mangalam, M. R. Swaminathan, P. G. (Azhvar) Kuppusami, E. Krishnamurthi
Athirsta Natchathiram				
Baktha Meera; Shok Sundaram and Grama Vijayam were shown as additional films	Y. V. Rao	Y. V. Rao, Chintamani Pictures		Y. V. Rao, Y. H. Rao, Vidwan Srinivasan, M. R. Durairaj, L. Narayana Rao, C. D. Vasundaradevi, Rajam, Abhayambal,
Baktha Nama Thevar				
Bhakthi or Ambharishan Charithiram	Murugadasa (originally Muthuswami Iyer)			R. Nagendra Rao, M. V. Subbaiah Naidu, Lakshmi Bai, Kamala Bai, P. R. Mangalam, P. G. Venkatesan, M. S. Saroja, K. R. Saradambal, K. Hiranaiah, M. K. Gopala Ayyangar, M. S. Subbanna, H. Ramachandra Sastry, V. Krishnappa, N. Ramasami Pillai, K. Ramakrishna Rao and R. Anantharamaiah
Bakya Leela				
Bookailash or Mandodhari Parinayam	Sundar Rao Nadkarni	Sundaram Sound Pictures		T. S. Sandhanam, Hamsa damaynthi
Dakshayagnam	Raja Chandrasekhar	Metropolitan Pictures		V. A. Chelappa, M. M. Radhabai, M. G. Nataraja Pillai, K. R. Jayalakshmi, P. G. Venkatesan, T. N. Chandramma, N. S. Krishnan, T. A. Madhuram, M. G. Ramachandran
Dhasavatharam				
Desa Munnetram	A. N. Kalyanasundaram	Sarvottam Badami, Sagar Movietone	Papanasam Sivan & A. N. Kalyanasundaram	Mathrimangalam Natesa Iyer, K. R. Chellam, Baby Rukmini, S. R. Padma, Sripatha Shankar, G. Govindarajulu Naidu, Seetha Devi, M. Lakshmanan, K. S. Gopalakrishnan, Kokilam
Eka-naathar	H. S. Mehta	Ponnambalam Pictures	N. P. S. Mani, N. Ramamoorthi	N. Krishnamoorthi, C. Padmavathibai, P. Rangasamy, Seetha, N. Srinivasan, Lakshmi, P. S. Krishnaswamy, Indirani.
En Kaathali				
Grama Vijayam; Was shown as additional film along with Baktha Meera				
Harijana Singam or Madras CID	Battling Mani	Zenith Film Company		Battling Mani, Kamala, Vittal, Swarna, Sripathy, Govindan
Jalaja or Natya Mahimai	G. K. Seshagiri			Kumbakonam K. Bhanumathi
Kambar or Kalviyin Vetri		T. R. Sundaram, Modern Theatres		
Kannappa Nayanar				V. N. Sundaram
Kutravaali				
Madasambirani				
Mayurathvajan		T. R. Sundaram, Modern Theatres		
Maya Mayavan	B. Sampathkumar	T. R. Sundaram, Modern Theatres		T. K. Sampangi, J. Susheela Devi, K. Kokila, Seetha Bai, Venugopala Sarma, G. R. Varadachar, K. Kaveri Chettiar, V.V.S. Mani, Venu Chetti, Devaraju
Muttal Mappillai				
Nandakumar	Keshav Rao Dhaibar	Keshav Rao Dhaibar & A. V. Meiyappan, Pragathi Pictures	S. V. Venkatraman	T. P. Rajalakshmi, C. V. V. Panthulu, T. S. Rajalakshmi, T. R. Mahalingam, T. R. Ramachandran, Master Sethuraman
Punjab Kesari				
Por Veeran Manaivi or Asattu Veeran Manavi				
Rajadrogi				
Sevasadanam	K. Subramanyam	K. Subramanyam, Madras United Artists Corporation	Papanasam Sivan	M. S. Subbulakshmi, F. G. Natesa Iyer, S. Varalakshmi, S. G. Pattu Iyer, Kumari Kamala, Jolly Kittu Iyer, Jayalakshmi, Ram Pyari
Shok Sundaram; Was shown as additional film along with Baktha Meera				
Sri Kandha Leela	Arshadrai Mehta	Premier Cinetone	G. Govindarajulu Naidu	K. L. V. Vasantha, Raja Dandapani, M. V. Mani, Sundarambal, Gnanamani, S. P. L. Dhanalakshmi, G. Govindarajulu Naidu, Seetha Devi
Sri Ramanujar	A. Narayanan			Dhinamalar N. Ramarathinam, Sangu Subramaniyam
Swarnalatha	Y. V. Rao	Newtone Studios	Harikesanallur Brothers; Lyrics: Yanai Vaidyanatha Iyer	Y. V. Rao, K. Ranganayaki, M. R. Durairaj, C. S. Swarnambal, L. Narayana Rao, ‘Vidwan’ Srinivasan, A. A. Somayajulu, Saranayaki, S. Kalyanam, S. G. Rajam, Raju and Nagalakshmi
Thayumanavar	T. R. Sundaram	T. R. Sundaram, Modern Theatres		M. M. Dandapani Desikar, M. S. Devasena, C. S. Selvaratnam Pillai, B. Saradhambal, T. E. Krishnamachari, N. S. Rathnambal, P. G. Venkatesan, P. S. Gnanam, U. R. Jeevarathinam
Tenali Raman	C. V. Raman	Majestic & Radha Film Co.		Joker Ramudu
Thukkaram	B. N. Rao	R. K. Ramakrishnan Chettiar & S. M. Sriramulu Naidu, Central Studios		Musiri Subramania Iyer, K. Sarangapani, K. Seetha, R. Balasubramaniam, K. A. Chokkalinga Bhagavathar, Baby R. Balasaraswathi Devi
Thulasi Brintha	A. Narayanan	A. Narayanan, Sreenivas Cinetone		
Vanaraja Karzan		Wadia Movietone		
Valibar Sangham	A. N. Kalyanasundaram	Sarvottam Badami, Sagar Movietone		
Vipra Narayana	A. Narayanan	A. Narayanan, Sound City		Kothamangalam Seenu, T. V. Rajasundari
Vishnu Leela	P. K. Raja Sandow	K. Subrahmanyam, Motion Picture Producer Combines		P. K. Raja Sandow, Serukalathur Sama
Yayathi	Manik Lal Tandon	Mohan Movietone	Papanasam Sivan	P. U. Chinnappa, P. B. Rangachari, M. V. Rajamma, C. S. Shamanna, C. S. M. Sulochana, T. S. Krishnaveni, M. S. Subramania Bhagavathar, M. S. Babu, K. S. Harihara Iyer, S. C. Gomathi Bai, M. L. Rajambal
Veera Jagathis	R. Prakash	V. S. Talkies		V. S. M. Rajaram Iyer, M. G. Ramachandran

== 1939 ==
Title	Director	Production	Music	Cast
Adhirshtam	S. D. S. Yogi	S. S. S. Chokkalingam, Mayuraa Films	Sarma Brothers	V. V. Sadagopan, T. Suryakumari, K. R. Chellam, M. N. Srinivasan
Aanandha Ashramam	C. V. Raman	Sri Ranga Films		P. B. Rangachari, C. V. V. panthulu, R. P. Lakshmi Devi
Baktha Kumanan	K. Ranga Rao			T. P. Rajalakshmi
Bharath Kesari				Madhiri Mangalam Nadesa Iyer, M. Latchumanan, Suseela Devi
Bombay Mail				K. P. Kesavan, T. S. Balaiah
Jothi	T. R. Raghunath	Jothi Pictures	Mariappa Swamigal	Muthu Bhagavathar, Madurai Sundaram, P. Nataraj, P. S. Krishnaveni, N. S. Krishnan, T. A. Mathuram
Kumara Kulothungan				T. R. Rajakumari
Kratha Arjuna				
Madurai Veeran; Released on 3 Feb 1939.	T. P. Rajalakshmi	Sri Rajam Talkies & Raju Films	T. P. Rajagopalan	V. A. Chellappa, T. P. Rajalakshmi, M. M. Chidhambaranathan, V. L. Mani, P. R. Mangalam
Manmatha Vijayam; Censored on 11.10.1939	G. Pattu Iyer	Jeya Films	M. Subramaniam, Sadasiva Brahmendra (one song - Sindhaa Naasthikila)	Electric Inspector M. Subramanian, Shanmuga Sundaram, A. S. Sankaran, S. Parthasarathi Iyengar, Santhanam, G. V. Sarma, C. R. Srinivasan, Natarajan, Ganapathi Bhat, S. K. Parthasarathi Iyengar, K. Aranganayagi, S. P. Seetha, Baby Lalitha, Dance: Mohana, Sampoorna, Saratha, Janaki
Manickavasagar	T. R. Sundaram	V. S. M. Gopala Krishnaiyer, Haran Talkies		M. M. Dandapani Desikar, M. S. Devasena
Mathru Bhoomi	H. M. Reddy	V. T. rajan, Vel Pictures	Papanasam Sivan	P. U. Chinnappa, T. S. Santhanam, T. V. Kumudhini, A. K. Rajalakshmi, Kali N. Rathnam, T. R. B. Rao, P. Saradambal
Maya Machhindra		Metropolitan Pictures		M. K. Radha, M. G. Ramachandran, M. S. Saroja, M. B. Radha Bai, Saradha Venkatachalam
Pandurangan	D. C. Gune	Vel Pictures (11.11.1939)	Papanasam Sivan	M. R. Krishnamoorthi, P. S. Sivapackiam, Kali N. Rathnam, T. A. Madhuram, P. Sarathambal
Prahaladha	B. N. Rao	Salem Sankar Films	Sharma Brothers	T. R. Mahalingam, M. R. Santhanalakshmi, R. Balasubramaniam, Nagercoil K. Mahadevan, M. G. Ramachandran, N. S. Krishnan, T. A. Madhuram, P. S. Gnanam, T. S. Durairaj
Rama Nama Mahimai; Alternative: Rama Anjaneya Yuddham	A. N. Kalyanasundaram	Sagar Movietone		Madhirimangalam Nadesa Iyer, Brahadhambal, Master Lakshmanan, Lakshmi, Baby Kamala
Rambaiyin Kaadhal	B. N. Rao	Central Studios		K. Sarangapani, K. L. V. Vasantha, N. S. Krishnan, T. A. Madhuram, Chokkalinga Bhagavathar, R. Balasubramaniam, T. S. Durairaj, Kali N. Rathnam
Sairanthiri or Keechaka vadham				
Sankarachariyar		T. R. Sundaram, Modern Theatres		V. N. Sundaram
Sakthi Maya	R. Prakash	K. Subrahmanyam, Motion Pictures		
Santhana Devan	S. Nottani	T. R. Sundaram; Modern Theatres	G. Rajagopal Naidu	G. M. Basheer, P. Bhanumathi, M. R. Radha, P. S. Gnanam, U. R. Jeevarathinam
Sitapaharanam	M. P. Sundara Rajan	Ranjith		K. Raja, Saraswathi, S. S. Rajagopalan, V. Ramachandra Bhagavathar
Shantha Sakkubai	Sundar Rao Nadkarni	Salem Shankar Films	Papanasam Sivan & Thuraiyur Rajagopala Sarma	K. Aswathamma, Bannibai, K. Sarangapani, Kothamangalam Seenu, Kothamangalam Subbu, P. G. Venkatesan, S. S. Rajamani, K. Aranganayaki, T. S. Krishnaveni, M. A. Ganapathi Bhat
Sirikkadhey				N. S. Krishnan, T. A. Madhuram, Kothamangalam Subbu, T. S. Durairaj, V. M. Ezhumalai, M. S. Murugesan, P. S. Gnanam
Sowbhagyavathi	Prem Chethna	Lakshmi Film Company; Kovai Premier Cinetone		Aayiram Mugam Ramkumar, G. Govindarajulu, S. P. L. Dhanalakshmi,
Suguna Sarasa	Narayan Deware			Kothamangalam Seenu, T. P. Rajalakshmi, M. S. Vijayal
Thyagabhoomi	K. Subramanyam	K. Subramanyam, Madras United Artists Corporation	Papanasam Sivan, Mothi Babu & Rajagopala Iyer	S. D. Subbulakshmi, Papanasam Sivan, Baby Saroja, K. J. Mahadevan, A. K. Kamalam, Baby Saroja
Thiruneelakantar	P. K. Raja Sandow		Papanasam Sivan	M. K. Thyagaraja Bhagavathar, Tirunelveli Paapa, Yaanai Vaidyanatha Iyer, S. S. Rajamani, N. S. Krishnan, T. A. Madhuram
Vimochanam	T. Marconi	Jaya, Hindustan Films	Ramani (Sarma Brothers)	Hemalatha, Kanthamani, Baby Jaya, Indira, Bhagirathi, T. P. Sundari, Selva, Suguna
Veera Ramani	K. Amarnath	Mohan Pictures	Biswas & Krishnaswami	K. T. Rukmini, P. S. Srinivasa Rao, S. R. Padma, T. V. Swami, K. Mani
