= Subhadra Parinayam =

- Directed by: Profulla Ghosh
- Based on: a sub story in Mahabharata
- Produced by: Samikannu Vincent
- Starring: S. V. Subbaiah Bhagavathar; T. S. Velammal; Buffoon Shanmugam; Karaikudi Ganesha Iyer
- Cinematography: Paul Brix; Bilmeyer Berkle
- Production companies: Pioneer Studios, Calcutta
- Release date: 27 April 1935 (India)
- Country: India
- Language: Tamil

Subhadra Parinayam is a 1935 Indian Tamil language film produced by Samikannu Vincent and directed by Profulla Ghosh. The film featured S. V. Subbaiah Bhagavathar and T. S. Velammal in the lead roles while the comedy track featured Buffoon Shanmugam, Karaikudi Ganesha Iyer and others.

== Plot ==
Lord Krishna wants his sister Subhadra to be married to Arjuna. But his elder brother Balarama who is an ally of Kauravas, wants to marry her to Duryodhana. However, Krishna succeeds in marrying Subhadra to Arjuna. He sends both of them away in a chariot. On hearing this, Balarama and Duryodhana send soldiers to capture and imprison them. After many twists and turns in the story, Balarama accepts the marriage and blesses the couple.

== Cast ==
The following list was compiled from a review article by Randor Guy that was published in The Hindu on 14 September 2013 and from the database of Film News Anandan.

- S. V. Subbaiah Bhagavathar as Arjuna
- T.S. Velammal as Subhadra
- T. K. Rukmini Ammal
- Karaikudi Ganesha Iyer
- Buffoon Shanmugham
- Kasi Viswanatha Iyer
- Ramasami Pillai

== Production ==
The film was produced by Samikannu Vincent, a pioneer in the production of Tamil films who owned the cinema hall, Variety Hall Talkies in Coimbatore. The film was shot at the Pioneer Studios in Calcutta and was directed by Prafulla Ghosh who successfully directed some Bengali and Tamil films. Cinematography was handled by Paul Brix and Bilmeyer Berkle.

Later, in 1941, the same story was filmed again Tamil with the title Subhadra Arjuna with Serukalathur Sama as Krishna and V. S. Mani as Arjuna.

== Soundtrack ==
There was no music composers during that period. The actors and actresses themselves sang the song according to set tunes. Sometimes songs were taken directly from devotional literature. The studio orchestra provided the background music.

== Reception ==
Writing in 2013 Randor Guy said, according to contemporary critical accounts, the film fared well in the box office. He further said in his review article that the film is "Remembered For The impressive performances of Subbaiah Bhagavathar and Velammal, the comical interludes of ‘Buffoon’ Shanmugham and others such as Ganesha Iyer, Kasi Viswanath and Ramasami Pillai."
