= Rajambal =

Rajambal may refer to:

- Rajambal (1935 film), a 1935 Indian Tamil-language film
- Rajambal (1951 film), a 1951 Indian Tamil-language film
- T. Rajambal, Indian politician
