= Radha Kalyanam =

Radha Kalyanam may refer to:

- Radha Kalyanam (1981 film), a Telugu drama film
- Radha Kalyanam (1935 film), a Tamil-language film
