= Sowbhagyavathi =

Sowbagyavathi
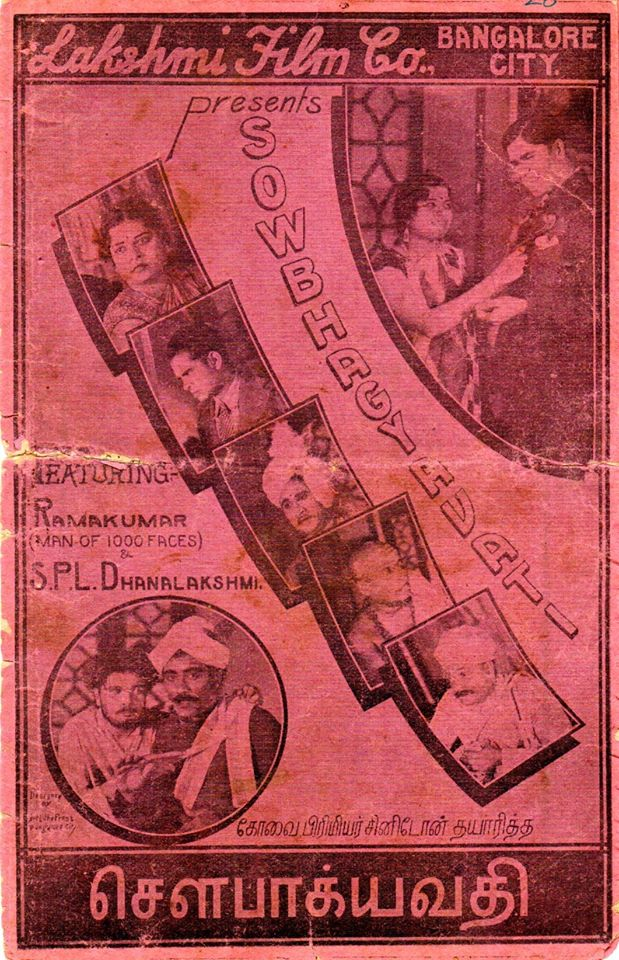
- Directed by: Prem Chetna
- Screenplay by: G. Govindarajulu
- Story by: Aayiram Mugam Ramkumar
- Starring: Aayiram Mugam Ramkumar; G. Govindarajulu; S. P. L. Dhanalakshmi; P. R. Mangalam
- Cinematography: J. S. Patel
- Edited by: D. Govindan
- Music by: G. Govindarajulu
- Production company: Lakshmi Film Company
- Distributed by: Kovai Premier Cinetone
- Release date: 26 August 1939 (India)
- Running time: 188 minutes
- Country: India
- Language: Tamil

Sowbagyavathi (transl. Lucky woman) is a 1939 Indian, Tamil-language film directed by Prem Chetna.

== Cast ==
The following list was adapted from the book Thamizh Cinema Ulagam

Male cast

- Aayiram Mugam Ramkumar as Judge Somu
- G. Govindarajulu as Zamindar
- P. V. Ethiraj as Vasu
- S. V. Sahasranamam as Kittu
- S. Krishna Sastry as Raoji Dewan
- B. K. Subramania Chetty as Cashier
- M. S. Murugesan as Murugesa Mudaliar
- M. R. Subramaniam as Sastry
- S. K. Muthukrishnan as Peon

Female cast

- S. P. L. Dhanalakshmi as Meena
- C. Padmavahi Bhai as Bhagyam
- P. R. Mangalam as Rajamma
- Gomathi Bhai as Ascetic
- Saraswathi as Friend
- Leela as Friend
- Padma as Friend
- Sivakami as Friend

== Production ==
The film was produced by Lakshmi Film Company and was distributed by Kovai Premier Cinetone. Prem Chetna directed the film Aayiram Mugam Ramkumar wrote the story and the dialogues were written by G. Govindarajulu. While the Cinematography was done by J. S. Patel. D. Govindan did the editing. M. D. Rajaram handled audiography. R. Krishnan was in-charge of the laboratory.

Aayiram Mugam Ramkumar has featured in Chandrakantha, a 1936 film as Detective Govindan and has directed the 1940 film Balya Vivaham. Sivaji Ganesan was said to have been impressed by Ramkumar and named his first son after him.

== Soundtrack ==
The music was composed by G. Govindarajulu while the lyrics were penned by L. Nanjappa Chetty. The actors themselves sang all the songs.

No.	Song	Ragam	Thalam	Singer
1	Sridhara Marugane			Sthothram
2	Pradhak Kaalam Punya Kaalam	Hindustani	Aribansi	S. P. L. Dhanalakshmi
3	Gokula Bala Gopaalaa			S. P. L. Dhanalakshmi
4	Naane Bhagyavathi			S. P. L. Dhanalakshmi
5	Theynadaiyile	Viruththam		S. P. L. Dhanalakshmi
6	Edhen Poorva Janmanthra Palano	Saamaa	Adhi	S. P. L. Dhanalakshmi
7	Devi Dheenarakshaki	Hamsanandhi	Adhi	S. P. L. Dhanalakshmi
8	Ullaasamaai Urangaai Uthamane	Neelambari jambai		S. P. L. Dhanalakshmi
9	Araro Ariraro	Lullaby		S. P. L. Dhanalakshmi
10	Enrenakkul Thiruvarul Varumo	Malgos	Adhi	C. Padmavathi
11	Dhukkame Dhukkame			Gomathi Bhai
12	Ulaganilai Muzhudhaagi	Viruththam		Gomathi Bhai
13	Madhava Mohana	Gummi		Chorus
14	Mangalame Subha Mangalame	Biyak		Chorus
