= Bhishma Pratigna =

Bhishma Pratigna (lit. 'Bhishma's vow' or 'horrifying vow') may refer to these related to the ancient Indian epic Mahabharata:

- Bhishma Pratigya/Pratigna, the vow by which Devavrata became known as Bhishma, a central character of the epic
- Bhishma Pratigna (1921 film), an Indian silent film
- Bhishma (1936 film), also known as Bhishma Pratigna, a 1936 Indian Hindu mythological film

== See also ==
- Bhishma (disambiguation)
- Pratigya (disambiguation)
