= M.P. Srinivasan =

Indian professor (born 1943)

Professor M.P. Srinivasan
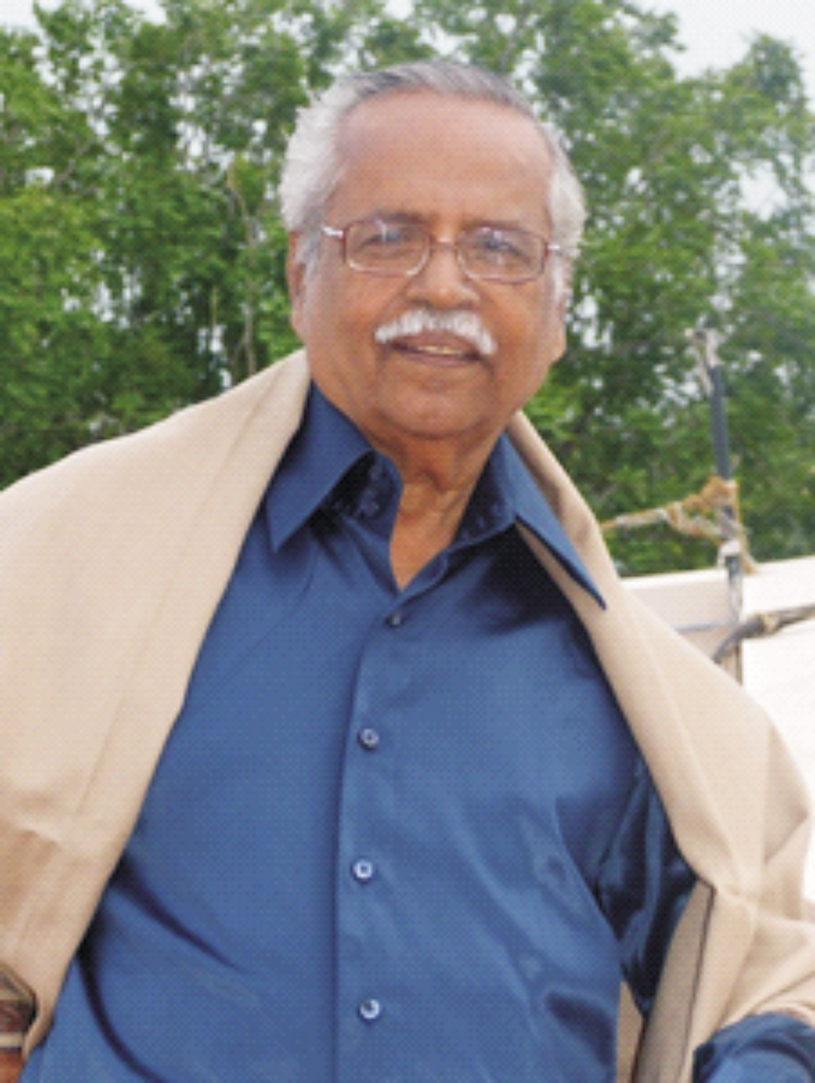
- Born: 16 August 1943 (age 76); Sendi Udayanathapuram near Sivagangai
- Education: Doctorate in Tamil
- Occupation: Academic
- Title: Professor of Tamil
- Term: 1968 – 2002

M. P. Srinivasan is an Indian professor.

== Personal ==
M.P. Srinivasan popularly known an ‘Mapesee’ was born in 1943, in a small village called Sendi Udayanathapuram near Sivagangai. After graduation in economics, he did his post graduation in Tamil in Thiyagarajar college, Madurai.

== Career and awards ==
He retired as a professor of Tamil after 34 years of meritorious service. He loved and learned Alwars works and scholarly commentaries on them. Besides obtaining Ph.D. in the same domain, he has also written many books covering literary criticism, comparative studies, monograph and Biography. He compiled and edited a few books, including ‘Nalayira Divya Prabhandam’.

2012 Chekkilar Research Centre Award, Chennai. |Book: கம்பனும் ஆழ்வார்களும்|

2015 Vallal Sadayappa Award, Madurai Kamban Kalakam, Madurai. |Book: கம்பனும் ஆழ்வார்களும்|

2011 Dr. Mu. Va. Ilakkiya Memorial Award, Kavithai Uravu Association, Chennai. |Book: ஆழ்வார்களும் தமிழ் மரபும்|

== Books compiled ==
Sl. No.	Works	Publisher	Year
1	Thirumankaiyalwar Madalkal	Annam, Sivagangai	1987
	Thirumankaiyalwar Madalkal (Re-edition)	Manivasakar pathipagam, Chidhambaram	2002
2	Vainava Ilakkia Vakaikal	Devaki pathippagam, Sivagangai	1994
	Divyaprabhanda Ilakkia Vakaikal(Revised Ed. of the above Book)	Meyyappan Tamilaivagam, Chidhambaram	2001
3	Periyalwar (under MIL series)	Sahitya Akademi, New Delhi.	1999, 2006, 2011, 2016
4	Kulasekaralwar	Sahitya Akademi, New Delhi.	2002, 2015
5	Kulasekaralwar (in English)	Sahitya Akademi, New Delhi.	2009
6	Periyalwar (in English)	Sahitya Akademi, New Delhi.	2014
7	Mudhalalwarkal	Sahitya Akademi, New Delhi.	2007, 2011
8	Divya prabhandham (selected verses) with a critical introduction	Sahitya Akademi, New Delhi.	2010
9	Oru Naall – Oru Paasuram	Manivasakar Pathippagam, Chennai	2003, 2006
10	Sri Ramanujar	Arutselvar N.Mahalingam / Varthamanan Pathippagam, Chennai	2006, 2009, 2014
11	Thirumurugatruppadai (Commentary)	Meenakshi Puthaka Nilayam, Madurai	2009
12	Alwarkalum Tamil Marabum	Meyyappan Pathippagam, Chidhambaram	2010
13	Kambanum Alwarkalum	Meenakshi Puthaka Nilayam, Madurai	2011
14	Kambanil Sanga Ilakkiam	Meenakshi Puthaka Nilayam, Madurai	2013
15	Vandaada Poomalara	Kavitha Publication, Chennai.	2013

== Books edited ==
Sl. No.	Works	Publisher	Year
16	Panchalatchana Thirumugavilasam (a satire on 1876 Famine)	Kavitha Publication, Chennai.	2014
17	Thirumankaiyalwar Noolkal	International Institute of Tamil Studies, Chennai.	2016
18	Nalayira Divya Prabhandham	Tamil University, Thanjavur(under print)	2016
