= Yayathi =

1938 Indian film by M. L. Tandon

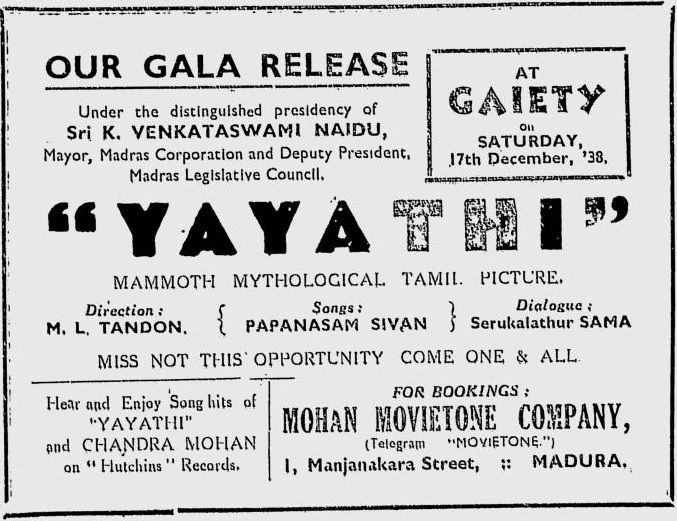
- Poster
- Directed by: Manik Lal Tandon
- Written by: Serukalathur Sama
- Story by: Pammal Sambandha Mudaliar
- Starring: P. U. Chinnappa; P. B. Rangachari; M. V. Rajamma
- Cinematography: A. K. Sen Gupta; S. C. Das
- Music by: Papanasam Sivan
- Production company: Mohan Movietone
- Release date: 17 December 1938 (India)
- Running time: 177 mins.
- Country: India
- Language: Tamil

Yayathi is a 1938 Indian, Tamil language film directed by M. L. Tandon. The film featured P. U. Chinnappa and M. V. Rajamma in the lead roles.

== Plot ==
The story was based on the life of a puranic king Yayati found in the Mahabharata's Adi Parva.

== Cast ==
The list is compiled from the database of Film News Anandan and a review article by Randor Guy.

Male cast

- P. U. Chinnappa
- P. B. Rangachari
- C. S. Shamanna
- M. S. Subramania Bhagavathar
- M. S. Babu
- K. S. Harihara Iyer

Female cast

- M. V. Rajamma
- C. S. M. Sulochana
- T. S. Krishnaveni
- S. C. Gomathi Bai
- M. L. Rajambal

== Production ==
The film was produced by Mohan Movietone of Madurai, and was directed by the Hollywood-trained filmmaker Manik Lal Tandon. The film was made in Calcutta.

An info is found in the review article that said, as reportedly said by M. V. Rajamma, that there were clashes between Chinnappa and Tandon during the shooting of the film and it was rumoured that the actor slapped the film maker.

== Soundtrack ==
Music was composed by Papanasam Sivan who also penned the lyrics. There were 25 songs in the film and some are available as 78 rpm records now. The available songs are sung by P. U. Chinnappa.

== Reception ==
Writing in the Hindu review article in 2010, Randor Guy says the film is remembered for "Chinnappa's performance and Tandon's deft direction."
