= Bhishma (disambiguation) =

Bhishma is a character in the ancient Indian epic Mahabharata.

Bhishma may also refer to:

- Bhishma Parva or Book of Bhishma, sixth book of the Mahabharata, contains the Bhagavad Gita
- Bhishmaka, father of Rukmini, a wife of the Hindu god Krishna
- Bhishma (1936 film), an Indian Hindu mythological film
- Bhishma (1962 film), a Telugu film
- Bhishma (1996 film), a Hindi film
- Bheeshma (2020 film), a Telugu film
- T-90 Bhishma, Russian tank design for Indian Armed Forces
- Bhishma Narain Singh (1933–2018), Indian politician
- Bhishma Shankar Tiwari (born 1960), an Indian politician

== See also ==
- Bhishma Pratigna (disambiguation)
