= Garuda Garvabhangam =

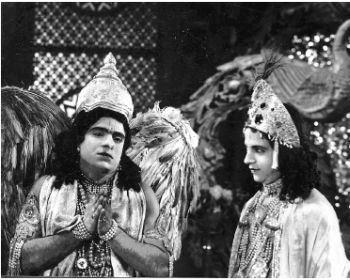
- Directed by: R. Padmanaban
- Starring: M. D. Parthasarathy; M. S. Mohanambal; Serukulathur Sama ‘Vidwan' Srinivasan; T. S. Mani; Vimala; M. D. Subramania Mudaliar
- Distributed by: Oriental Films
- Release date: 1936
- Language: Tamil

Garuda Garvabhangam is a 1936 Tamil-language film starring M. D. Parthasarathy, M. S. Mohanambal, Serukulathur Sama, Vidwan Srinivasan, T. S. Mani, Vimala and M. D. Subramania Mudaliar. It was directed by R. Padmanaban. This film was remade in Telugu in 1943, by Ghantasala Balaramaiah with P. Bhanumathi, Vedantham Raghavaiah, Vemuri Gaggaiah and Ramakrishna Sastri.

== Production ==
The plot of the film is based on a Hindu mythological episode on the life of the Hindu God Krishna. A number of movies had been made on the episode, the first being a silent film by A. Narayanan in 1929. But the 1936 version in Tamil appears to be the first talkie made on the subject. The film was remade in Telugu by Ghantasala Balaramayya in 1943. The film was shot entirely in Pioneer Studios in Calcutta.
