= Draupadi Vastrapaharanam (1934 film) =

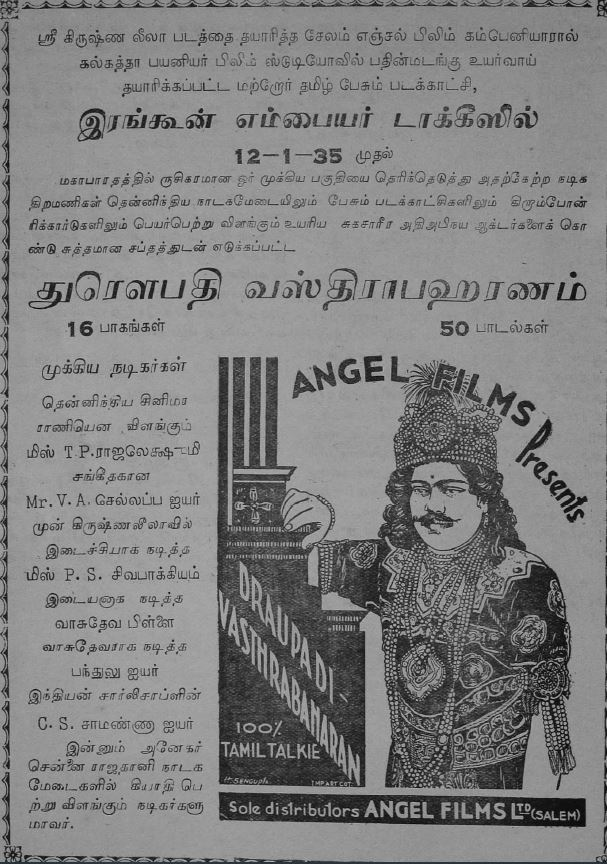
- A poster of Draupadi Vastrapaharanam (Thanavanikan Magazine 1935, Rangoon)
- Directed by: R. Padmanaban; Raghupathi Surya Prakash
- Starring: T. P. Rajalakshmi; V. A. Chellappa; Serukulathur Sama
- Release date: 1934
- Country: India
- Language: Tamil

Draupadi Vastrapaharanam (transl. The Disrobing of Draupadi) is a 1934 Tamil-language film starring T. P. Rajalakshmi, V. A. Chellappa and Serukulathur Sama. The movie was directed by R. Padmanaban. Encyclopaedia of Indian Cinema also credits Raghupathi Surya Prakash (R. S. Prakash) as the director.

== Plot ==
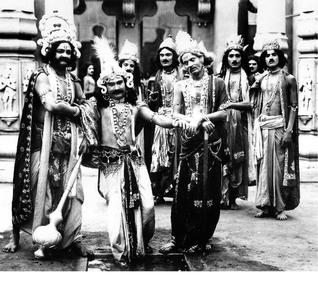
A scene from Draupadi Vastrapaharanam

The film is based on the episode of the dice game and the disrobing of Draupadi, the common wife and chief queen of the five Pandava brothers, in the Indian epic Mahabharatha.

== Cast ==
- T. P. Rajalakshmi as Draupadi
- V. A. Chellappa as Duryodhana
- M. D. Parthasarathy as Yudhishtra
- Serukulathur Sama as Krishna
