= Cinema Theater Day =

Cinema Theater day is celebrated on the birthday of Swamikannu Vincent, who built the first theater in South India. He built Variety Hall (now Delite Theatre) in Coimbatore in 1914. The day is set to commemorate the centenary year of Variety Hall.

== Origin ==
G K Tirunavukarasu of 80-20 Pictures, initiated the idea of celebrating the birthday of Swamikannu Vincent. He wanted to bring the cinema theaters and film industry closer to each other. He felt it was critical as there were as much as 2500 theatres in Tamil Nadu once and now there are only 1200 theaters. With the enthusiastic research and work of people from both inside and outside the cine industry, the Cinema theater day is set to be celebrated on 18 April 2014.

== Reaction ==
The idea was met with great enthusiasm inside the film fraternity. Abirami Ramanathan, leading distributor and multiplex owner said " The french film exhibitor DuPont was screening "Life of Jesus" in various places in India. When he had to leave to France, Swamikannu Vincent took up the job, which has resulted now in different type of theaters". Noted film producer and director AR Murugadoss also quoted "We should be thankful to the contribution of people like Swamikannu Vincent. Because of him we enjoy movies in air-conditioned theaters"
