= Bhaktha Sri Thyagaraja =

- Film poster
- Directed by: Virendra Desai
- Screenplay by: M. P. Sundararajan
- Starring: Mathirimangalam Natesa Iyer; Kamala; Seetha; T. P. K. Sastry
- Cinematography: Rajanikantha Pandya
- Production company: Sagar Movietone
- Release date: 27 March 1937
- Country: India
- Language: Tamil

Bhaktha Sri Thyagaraja (also known as Sri Thiagaraja Charitham) is a 1937 Indian Tamil-language biographical film written by M. P. Sundararajan and directed by Virendra Desai. Produced by Sagar Movietone, Mathirimangalam Natesa Iyer, Kamala and Seetha appeared in the leading roles. The film is based on the life of the Carnatic musician Tyagaraja. The film's success at the box office was largely attributed to its music.

== Cast ==
Credits adapted from The Hindu:

- Mathirimangalam Natesa Iyer as Tyagaraja
- Kamala as Tyagaraja's wife
- Seetha as Tyagaraja's sister-in-law
- T.P.K. Sastry as the king of Thanjavur/a musician
- C.P.S. Mani Iyer
- S.K. Sundaram
- ‘Gavai’ Kalyanam
- A. Dhanapal Chettiar
- V.B. Srinivasan
- ‘Baby’ Kokila
- ‘Master’ Pranatharthiharan
- Padmanabhachar
- Rajagopala Iyer

== Production ==
Bhaktha Sri Thyagaraja, alternatively known as Sri Thiagaraja Charitham, was based on the life of the Carnatic musician Tyagaraja. It was produced by the Bombay-based Sagar Movietone. Director Virendra Desai was not fluent in Tamil, so T. P. Kalyanarama Sastry, a lawyer from Chennai who was also involved in film production, worked as an associate director. An attorney from Chennai, M. P. Sundararajan wrote the screenplay. His son M. P. S. Pranatharthiharan, played a child's role in the film. On-location filming took place at the Tirupathi Venkateshwara Temple. The final length of the film was 14,533 feet (4,430 m).

== Soundtrack ==
There were 32 songs in the film. The ragas used in the film include Thodi, Naata, Bowli, Kapi, Kalyani, Atana, Kaanada, Bilahari, Neelambari and Nalinakanthi. Almost all the songs were in Telugu. Mathirimangalam Natesa Iyer, an Carnatic musician, sang most of the songs. There were two songs in Tamil: one by a group sung by the thieves who were waiting to way-laid Tyagaraja. The other Tamil song "Sivano" is a translation of Tygaraja's popular kruthi "Evareni".

== Reception ==
According to film historian Randor Guy, the film was a box office success mainly because of the music. He stated the film would be remembered for "The classic compositions of Saint Thyagaraja rendered by Natesa Iyer and the on-screen narration by Virendra Desai."
