= Rajambal (1951 film) =

- Theatrical release poster
- Directed by: R. M. Krishnaswamy
- Screenplay by: A. T. Krishnaswamy
- Based on: Rajambal by J. R. Rangaraju
- Produced by: V. C. Subburaman; M. Radhakrishnan; R. M. Krishnaswamy
- Starring: R. S. Manohar; P. K. Saraswathi; K. Sarangapani; Madhuri Devi
- Cinematography: R. M. Krishnaswamy
- Edited by: C. V. Raju; Pal G. Yadav
- Music by: M. S. Gnanamani
- Production company: Aruna Films
- Distributed by: Giridhar Pictures
- Release date: 14 September 1951
- Running time: 209 minutes
- Country: India
- Language: Tamil

Rajambal is a 1951 Indian Tamil language film directed by R. M. Krishnaswamy. The film stars R. S. Manohar and P. K. Saraswathi. It is based on the play of the same name by J. R. Rangaraju. The film was released on 14 September 1951.

== Plot ==
The story is of a judicial officer who misuses his office to achieve his personal needs.

== Cast ==
List adapted from the film's song book

Male cast

- Manohar as Gopalan
- S. Balachander as Natesan
- K. Sarangapani as Detective Govindan
- B. R. Panthulu as Saminatha Sastri
- M. V. Mani as Lawyer Duraisami Iyengar
- (Friend) Ramasami as Ramanna
- T. N. Sivathanu as Neelamega Sastri
- Stunt Somu as Narasimhalu Naidu
- P. Sundar Rao as Manavala Naidu
- Kulathu Mani as Judge
- V. K. Karthikeyan as Murugan
- T. V. Sethuraman as Muniyan

Female cast

- P. K. Saraswathi as Rajambal
- Madhuri Devi as Lokasundari
- C. R. Rajakumari as Balambal
- T. P. Muthulakshmi as Kanakavalli
- C. K. Saraswathi as Mangalam
- K. S. Angamuthu as Pankajam
- P. S. Gnanam as Pavadai
- K. S. Adilakshmi as Rukmani

== Production ==
The film was produced by V. C. Subbaraman and M. Radhakrishnan together with R. M. Krishnaswamy who also directed the film and handled the cinematography. C. V. Raju and Paul G. Yadav did the editing. The screenplay was based on a stage play with the same name written by J. R. Rangaraju. Dialogues were penned by A. T. Krishnaswamy. T. V. Sarma was in charge of art direction while the choreography was done by Kumar. Still photography was done by R. N. Nagaraja Rao. The film was processed at Vijaya laboratory.

This film is the debut for R. S. Manohar. He was working in the Postal Department and was acting in stage dramas as an amateur artiste.

This is the second version of the stage play. It was filmed earlier in 1935 with the same title, Rajambal directed by A. Narayanan.

== Censorship ==
Film historian Randor Guy says when the producer went to renew the certificate, the then Regional Censor Officer G. T. Sastri, who was the toughest ever censor officer, not only refused to renew the certificate but also asked to surrender the negatives of the film as the subject of the story "was illegal, immoral and anti-social".

== Soundtrack ==
Music for songs was composed by M. S. Gnanamani while background score was by S. Balachander.

Song	Singer/s	Lyricist	Length
"Kani Mozhi Maathae"	A. M. Rajah & P. Leela	A. Maruthakasi	03:25
"Thathina Theen Pasi Theeruma"	P. Leela & group	A. Maruthakasi	
"Vaazhvu Uyara Vendum"	M. L. Vasanthakumari	A. Maruthakasi	03:02
"Ahaa Haa Manaiviyaaven"	M. L. Vasanthakumari	A. Maruthakasi	03:00
"Theeraadha Thunbam Thaanaa"	M. L. Vasanthakumari	A. Maruthakasi	
"Jayame Vaazhvil Peruvaen"	P. Leela	A. Maruthakasi	02:53
"Idhaya Thaamarai Malara Cheyvadhum"	V. N. Sundaram & P. Leela	A. Maruthakasi	
"Maathar Maniye Vaa"	S. Balachander & P. Leela	A. Maruthakasi	03:09
"Ullondru Vaithu"	Thiruchi Loganathan	A. Maruthakasi	
"Oru Thinusaa Irukudhu"	A. G. Rathnamala & K. Sarangapani	Ku. Sa. Krishnamoorthy	02:55

== Reception ==
The film fared moderately at the box office. According to Randor Guy, it is "Remembered for R. S. Manohar’s film debut, ‘Veena’ Balachandar’s performance and background score and for being the first production of RMK."
