= Samikannu Vincent =

Indian filmmaker (1883–1942)

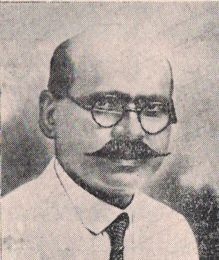
- Born: 18 April 1883; Kottaimedu, Coimbatore, Madras Presidency
- Died: 22 April 1942 (aged 59); Coimbatore, Madras Presidency
- Occupations: Film producer Film maker
- Writing career
- Language: Tamil

Samikannu Vincent (18 April 1883 – 22 April 1942) was a filmmaker and cinema exhibitor from Coimbatore, India. He was a pioneer in the movie business in South India. In 1905, he established tent cinemas where movies were projected in a makeshift tent in open spaces which were a precursor to modern day movie theaters. In 1914, he established Variety Hall in Coimbatore, which was one of the first permanent movie theatres in South India. He was later involved in the production and direction of Tamil movies.

== Early life and family ==
Samikannu Vincent was born on 18 April 1883 to Thambusamy in Coimbatore, Madras Presidency, India. He worked as a draftsman-clerk with South Indian Railway at Ponmalai in Tiruchirappalli. Samikannu had four wives with whom he had four sons and two daughters. Samikannu died on 22 April 1942. Tamil film actor J. P. Chandrababu was married to one of the granddaughters of Samikannu.

== Career ==
During his career as a clerk with South Indian railway, Samikannu was exposed to short films exhibited by DuPont, a French film exhibitor. In 1905, When DuPont wanted to return home, Samikannu raised money to buy the projector, accessories and films used by DuPont for ₹2,250 (US$23). He resigned his job and set up business as a film exhibitor screening films across India, Afghanistan and Myanmar. He established "tent cinemas" which were effectively makeshift tents erected on open land close to a town or village, pioneering the cinema show business in South India.

Samikannu established the first tent cinema at Madras called Edison's Grand Cinemamegaphone. The electrically lit tents drew large crowds and quickly became popular. Buoyed by the success, Samikannu established a brick and mortar cinema house called "Variety Hall" in 1914, which was one of the first permanent movie theatres in South India. The cinema hall initially screened silent films with commentary, later moving on to talkie films with the evolution of Indian cinema. However, in c. 1912-14, Raghupathi Venkaiah Naidu had already established Gaiety Theatre on Mount Road, as the first ever permanent cinema theatre in Madras and all of South India.

In 1916, he established a printing press near his theatre to print handbills. Called an electric printing works, he used the cinema house's power plant to power the machinery for the press. In 1919, he established the first power-driven rice and flour mill in Coimbatore. In 1922, with the aid of C. P. Ramaswamy Aiyer, then member of the Governor's Executive Council of the Government of Madras, Samikannu brought an electric generator to set up a power house and lighted up the Variety Hall road in Coimbatore.

In 1933, Samikannu along with Pioneer film company in Calcutta co-produced Valli Thirumanam, based on the story of Hindu God Murugan. It was directed by P. V. Rao with T.P. Rajalakshmi in the lead role and went on to become a commercial success. He also co-produced other Tamil movies such as Sampoorna Harichandra and Subhadra Parinayam later. In 1935, when Central Studios was established in Coimbatore, Samikannu joined the studio as a director.

== Legacy ==
Samikannu's birthday is celebrated as Cinema Theater Day in Tamil Nadu. A Tamil documentary Pezhamozi (Silent Language) based on Samikannu's life was released in 2016.
