= Pratigya =

Pratigya may refer to:

- Pratiggya, a 1943 Indian film
- Pratigya (1975 film), an Indian Hindi-language film starring Dharmendra
- Pratigna (1982 film), an Indian film
- Pratigya (novel), a novel by Indian writer Premchand
- Pratigya (TV series), an Indian television series

== See also ==
- Bhishma Pratigna (disambiguation)
