= P. K. Raja Sandow =

Indian actor, film director and producer (1894/5–1943)

Raja Sandow
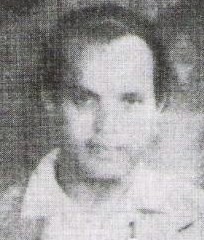
- Born: 1894 or 1895; Pudukottai, India
- Died: 1943 (aged 48–49)
- Occupations: Film director, film producer, Actor
- Years active: 1923–1943

Raja Sandow (born P. K. Nagalingam) (1894/5–1943) was an Indian actor, film director and producer. He began his career as an actor in silent films and later became a prominent actor and director in Tamil and Hindi films of the 1930s. He is considered one of the pioneers of early Indian cinema.

== Biography and career ==
Raja Sandow was born in Pudukottai, Tamil Nadu into a mixed Tamil and Telugu family. He was trained as a gymnast and started his film career as a stunt actor in S.N. Patankar's National Film Company at Bombay. He was given the name "Raja Sandow" because of his physique (after Prussian strongman Eugen Sandow). His first lead role was in Patankar's Bhakta Bodana (1922), for which he was paid Rs. 101 as salary. He became famous by starring in silent films like Veer Bhemsen (1923), and The Telephone Girl (1926). After acting in a few silent films, he also worked as a director in Ranjit Studios for a monthly salary. His first film as director was Sneh Jyoti (1928).

Returning to Tamil Nadu, he directed and acted in a number of silent films for R. Padmanaban's Associate Film Company. Many of his silent films had reformist social themes like Peyum pennum (1930), Nandhanar (1930), Anadhai Penn (1931), Pride of Hindustan (1931) and sathi usha sundari (1931). After talking films were introduced with Alam Ara in 1931, he went back to Bombay and starred in many Hindi and Tamil talkies. He was often paired with the actresses Gohar and Sulochana (Ruby Myers). Between 1932 and 1935, he acted in many socially themed Hindi films like Shyam Sundar (1932), Devaki (1934) and Indira MA (1935). In 1935, he was commissioned to direct his first Tamil film Menaka and returned to Madras. He continued directing and acting in films till his death in 1943. Vasantha Sena(1936), Chalak Chor (1936), Chandra kantha (1936), Vishnuleela (1938), Thiruneelakantar (1939) and Choodamani (1941) were some of the films he directed and starred in during that period. The last film he worked in was Sivakavi (1943). Sandow suffered a heart attack and died at Coimbatore on 25 November 1943. He was survived by his wife Leelabai and one son.

== Legacy ==
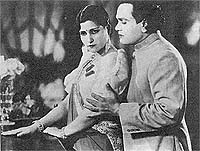
Raja Sandow with Sulochana (Ruby Myers) in Indira M.A (1934)

Sandow was the first Tamil film director to adopt the practice of using names of actors in film titles. He was the first to introduce intimate kissing scenes and dancers in revealing costumes to the then conservative Tamil film industry. He was also the first director and producer to move Tamil cinema from remaking mythological stories and into making social themed films. He even advertised his films as "Don't miss to see your own picture". Sandow was also the first director to use Tamil literary works for film by directing Anadhai penn in 1931 based on Vai. Mu. Kothainayagi Ammal's novel of the same name.

Writing about Sandow, film historian Theodore Baskaran says:

As a director, actor, scriptwriter and producer, his contribution to Tamil cinema is significant. Many of the stars of the Forties and Fifties have worked with him. He was very competent at coaching actors and maintained complete control over his films. He was a martinet on the sets and was often compared to a ringmaster in a circus. In his films, the emphasis shifted from songs to the spoken word.

Film historian Randor Guy has also described him as a tough task master:

Raja Sandow was a tough and no-nonsense guy who would not hesitate to shout at and slap his crew and cast including women! Regretfully there are no such directors these days!.

The Tamil Nadu Government has instituted an annual award in his name called Raja Sandow memorial Award, given for outstanding services to Tamil Cinema. A postage stamp has been in issued in recognition of his contributions to Indian cinema.

== Filmography ==
| Year | Film | Language | Credits |
|---|---|---|---|
| 1922 | Bhakta Bodana | Silent film | Actor |
| 1922 | Karna | Silent film | Actor |
| 1922 | Suryakumari | Silent film | Actor |
| 1923 | Veer Bhimsen | Silent film | Actor |
| 1923 | Vratrasoor Vadha | Silent film | Actor |
| 1924 | Ra Mandlik | Silent film | Actor |
| 1924 | Bismi Sadi | Silent film | Actor |
| 1924 | Razia Begum | Silent film | Actor |
| 1924 | Sadguni Sushila | Silent film | Actor |
| 1924 | Sati Sone | Silent film | Actor |
| 1925 | Deshna Dushman (The Divine Punishment) | Silent film | Actor |
| 1925 | Deva dasi | Silent film | Actor |
| 1925 | Indrasabha | Silent film | Actor |
| 1925 | Kala Chor(The Black Thief) | Silent film | Actor |
| 1925 | Khandani Khavis(The Noble Scamp) | Silent film | Actor |
| 1925 | Matri Prem(For Mother's Sake) | Silent film | Actor |
| 1925 | Mojili Mumbai (The Slaves of Luxury) | Silent film | Actor |
| 1925 | Panchdanda(Five Divine Wands) | Silent film | Actor |
| 1925 | Raja Yogi | Silent film | Actor |
| 1925 | Suvarna | Silent film | Actor |
| 1925 | Veer Kunal | Silent film | Actor |
| 1925 | Vimala | Silent film | Actor |
| 1926 | Madhav Kam Kundala | Silent film | Actor |
| 1926 | Mena Kumari | Silent film | Actor |
| 1926 | Muntaz Mahal | Silent film | Actor |
| 1926 | Neerajanam | Silent film | Actor |
| 1926 | Prithvi Putra | Silent film | Actor |
| 1926 | Ra Kawat | Silent film | Actor |
| 1926 | Samrat Shiladitya | Silent film | Actor |
| 1926 | Telephone Girl | Silent film | Actor |
| 1926 | Typist Girl | Silent film | Actor |
| 1927 | Bhaneli Bhamini | Silent film | Actor |
| 1927 | Gunsundari | Silent film | Actor |
| 1927 | Sati Madri | Silent film | Actor |
| 1927 | Sindh Ni Sumari | Silent film | Actor |
| 1927 | The Mission Girl | Silent film | Actor |
| 1927 | Aladdin Aur Jadui Chirag(Aladdin & the Wonderful Lamp) | Silent film | Actor |
| 1928 | Grihalakshmi | Silent film | Actor |
| 1928 | Naag Padmini | Silent film | Actor |
| 1928 | Sneh Jyoti | Silent film | Actor, director |
| 1928 | Up-to-date | Silent film | Actor |
| 1928 | Vishwamohini | Silent film | Actor |
| 1929 | Young India | Silent film | Actor |
| 1929 | Young India | Silent film | Actor |
| 1930 | Bhimsen The Mighty | Silent film | Actor |
| 1930 | Peyum pennum | Silent film | Actor, director |
| 1930 | Rajlakshmi | Silent film | Actor |
| 1930 | Nandhanar (Elevation of the Downtrodden) | Silent film | Actor, director |
| 1930 | Sri Valli Thirumanam | Silent film | Actor, director |
| 1930 | Anadhai penn | Silent film | Actor, director |
| 1931 | Taranhar (Pride of Hindustan) | Silent film | Actor, director |
| 1931 | Sati Usha Sundari | Silent film | Director |
| 1931 | Rajeshwari | Silent film | Director |
| 1931 | Bhaktavatsala (Dhuruvanin Garvabangam) | Silent film | Director |
| 1932 | Parijaatha pushpaharanam | Tamil | Director |
| 1932 | Shyam sundar | Hindi | Actor |
| 1933 | Pardesi Preetam | Hindi | Actor |
| 1933 | Noor-E-Imaan | Hindi | Actor |
| 1934 | Devaki | Hindi | Actor |
| 1934 | Kashmeera | Hindi | Actor |
| 1934 | Toofani Taruni | Hindi | Actor |
| 1934 | Indira M.A | Hindi | Actor |
| 1935 | Toofani Taruni | Hindi | Actor |
| 1935 | Raat-Ki-Rani | Hindi | Actor, director |
| 1935 | Barrister's wife | Hindi | Actor |
| 1935 | College Kanya | Hindi | Actor |
| 1935 | Desh Dasi | Hindi | Actor |
| 1935 | Menaka | Tamil | Director |
| 1936 | Prabhu Ka Pyara | Hindi | Actor |
| 1936 | Vasantha Sena | Tamil | Actor, director |
| 1936 | Vasantha Sena | Tamil | Actor, director |
| 1936 | Chalak Chor | Hindi | Actor, director |
| 1936 | Chandrakantha | Tamil | Scriptwriter, director |
| 1936 | Dil ka Daku | Hindi | Actor |
| 1936 | Matlabi Duniya | Hindi | Actor |
| 1937 | Toofani Tarzan | Hindi | Actor |
| 1937 | Minor Rajamani | Tamil | Director |
| 1938 | Nandha Kumar | Tamil | Actor |
| 1938 | Vishnuleela | Tamil | Actor, director |
| 1939 | Thiruneelakantar | Tamil | Actor |
| 1941 | Choodamani | Telugu | Director |
| 1942 | Araichimani | Tamil | Director |
| 1943 | Sivakavi | Tamil | Director (replaced halfway) |
