= Athiroopa Amaravathi =

1935 film by C. V. Raman

- Poster
- Directed by: C. V. Raman
- Starring: T. S. Velambal; T. N. Sivakozhundhu; K. K. Thangavelu Pillai; K. Ranganayaki
- Cinematography: Sundar Rao Nadkarni
- Music by: S. S. Sankaralinga Kavirayaral
- Production companies: Sundaram Talkies, Coimbatore
- Release date: 1935
- Country: India
- Language: Tamil

Athiroopa Amaravathi is a 1935 Indian Tamil-language romantic adventure film directed by C. V. Raman. The film stars T. N. Sivakozhundhu, T. S. Velambal and K. Ranganayaki.

== Plot ==
While on an adventure, Prince Athiroopan falls in love with Amaravathi, a princess.

== Cast ==
Male cast

- T. N. Sivakozhundhu as Athiroopan
- P. M. Sundarabhashyam as King Vichithra
- K. K. Thangavelu Pillai as Bandit Leader
- P. R. Swaminathan as Bandit
- P. K. Sambandan as Clown
- M. M. Kanakasabai as Madavyan
- F. M. Arumugam as Madavyan
- V. M. Ezhumalai as Madavyan

Female cast

- Miss T. S. Velambal as Amaravathi
- Miss K. Ranganayaki as Rathnavali
- Miss P. S. Krishnaveni as Bandit

Orchestra

- Rangasami Naicker – Harmonium
- Abdul Sadar – Sarangi
- Govindasami – Tabla

== Production ==
Athiroopa Amaravathi was directed by C. V. Raman and produced by the Coimbatore-based Sundaram Talkies. Shooting took place at Sundaram Sound Studios, which later evolved into Sathya Studios.

== Soundtrack ==
S. S. Sankaralinga Kavirayaral worked as the lyricist, and historian Randor Guy believes he composed the music too. The songs were recorded by P. K. Viswanathan. The film had 45 songs, most of which were set in carnatic ragas while others were inspired by popular Hindi film songs.

== Release and reception ==
According to Randor Guy, the film succeeded commercially because of "the interesting adventures of the couple, the comedy scenes, and also the settings and costumes, which were done at considerable expense", despite the "predictable storyline".
