= Chandrakantha =

Film by P. K. Raja Sandow

- Theatrical release poster
- Directed by: P. K. Raja Sandow
- Screenplay by: J. R. Rangaraju
- Based on: Chandrakantha Hindi Novel (1888) by Devaki Nandan Khatri
- Starring: Kali N. Rathnam; P. U. Chinnappa; N. S. Krishnan; S. Ramkumar; Saraswathi; C. Padmavathi Bhai
- Cinematography: M. M. Purohit
- Edited by: P. K. Raja Sandow
- Production company: Jupiter Pictures
- Release date: 1936
- Country: India
- Language: Tamil

Chandrakantha is a 1936 Indian, Tamil-language film directed by P. K. Raja Sandow.

== Cast ==
The following cast list was adapted from the book Thamizh Cinema Ulagam Part-1.

Male cast

- Kali N. Rathnam as Thirukallur Bandaara Sannidhigal
- T. R. B. Rao as Narayana Reddy, Subedar Annasamy
- Pudukottai P. U. Chinnappa as Kandur Prince
- M. Kosalam as Raghava Reddy
- Aayiram Mugam S. Ramkumar as Detective Govindan
- M. K. Gopalan as Sub-Magistrate Thandavarayan
- N. S. Krishnan as Barber Muniyan
- P. Sundar Rao as Kandur Regent
- T. S. Kannan as Police constable Gundu Rao
- T. S. V. Gopal as Moththaiyur Bandaara Sannidhigal
- Master Shankar Rao as Kid Raghava Reddy
- N. Ramanathan as Veera Reddy
- N. A. Natesan as Karbar Ascetic

Female cast

- Saraswathi as Chandravathana
- A. K. Rajalakshmi as Chandrakantha
- C. Padmavathi Bhai as Bhagyam
- Leela Bhai as Kandur Queen
- P. Susheela (Note: Not P. Susheela) as Barber Suppi
- T. K. Dhanalakshmi as Sangeetham
- C. J. Kamakoti as Abhimaana Dasi
- Harel as English Dasi
- Ammukutti as Malayala Dasi
- Ganga as Hindi Dasi
- T. M. Alamelu as Dasi
- Shanmugavalli as Dasi
- Mahalakshmi as Dasi
- K. M. Sethu Bai as Dasi

== Production ==
The film was produced under the banner Jupiter Pictures and was directed by P. K. Raja Sandow. J. R. Rangaraju wrote the story and dialogues. Cinematography was done by M. M. Purohit while editing was done by P. K. Raja Sandow. Audiography was done by Sripath Patel and Saiyed Mothimmaiah. Gokale was in-charge of Settings. The film was shot and processed at Saraswathi Cinetone, Pune.

The film was based on the life of Heads of religious mutts and caused an uproar when it was released. There were requests to ban the film.

== Soundtrack ==
No credits are given for music direction and lyrics. One kriti by Thiyagaraja – Nidhi Saala Sugama – was included in the film.

List of songs

No.	Song	Singer/s
1	Chandrakantha Kodi Parandhaaduthu	Chorus
2	Thaaye Mana Chanjalamaen	Master Shankar Rao
3	Aaraariro Magale	C. Padmavathi Bhai
4	Vaangi Tharandi Selai	N. S. Krishnan, P. Susheela (Note: Not P. Susheela)
5	Aanandame Enakaananda Diname	A. K. Rajalakshmi
6	Pennaagi Vandhathoru Maaya	Kali N. Rathnam
7	Kaama Rathiye Kalaanidhiye	Kali N. Rathnam with one Dasi
8	Konju Mozhi Anjugame	P. U. Chinnappa
9	Kaama Vaadhai Thaan Meeruthe	A. K. Rajalakshmi
10	Sundaraangi Subha Mohini	P. U. Chinnappa
11	Thirumana Kaadchiyaik Kaana	(in Radio)
12	Enna Janmam Indha Janmam	A. K. Rajalakshmi
13	Nidhi Saala Sugama	Carnatic music concert
14	Soma Chandhira Vadhanaa	M. Kosalam
15	Ninda Saundharyam Kandu Pennu	Kali N. Rathnam, Ammukutty
16	Kaama Kalavikoru Kshemame Perugum	Kali N. Rathnam with multiple Dasis
