= Sirikkadhey =

1939 film produced by S. S. Vasan

- Poster
- Produced by: S. S. Vasan
- Production company: Sri Ranjani Pictures
- Distributed by: Gemini Pictures Circuit
- Release date: 23 December 1939
- Country: India
- Language: Tamil

Sirikkadhey (pronounced [siɾikaːðeː] transl. Don't laugh) is a 1939 Indian Tamil-language anthology film produced by S. S. Vasan under Sri Ranjani Pictures. It consists of five short comedy films: Adangapidari (transl. Shrew), Malai Kannan, Yama Vadhanai, Poli Samiyar (transl. The fake swami) and Puli Vettai (transl. Tiger hunt). Widely recognised as the first anthology film in India, Sirikkadhey was released on 23 December 1939 and became a major commercial success.

== Plot ==
=== Malai Kannan ===
A man suffering from nyctalopia goes through many misadventures while on the way to the house of his in-laws.

=== Poli Samiyar ===
A carpenter lives with his wife. A bearded swami, seemingly holy and spiritual but actually a wolf in sheep's clothing, lusts for the carpenter's wife. She alerts her husband to the swami's dishonorable intentions and the clever carpenter plans to expose the pious fraud. The wife pretends to lead the swami on with sly glances and seductive smiles. The swami is delighted and accepts the woman's invitation to visit her house for climactic consummation. The carpenter hides and the swami arrives. To make him more presentable, the woman offers him a popular soap. The "soap" inside the wrapper is actually a cheap cake with depilatory properties. The swami is shocked to find after the wash, his fake beard and all coming off. The carpenter arrives with some other people, and the fraudulent swami is attacked with slaps, kicks and jabs, much to the delight of the carpenter and his wife.

== Production ==
Sirikkadhey was produced by S. S. Vasan under Sri Ranjani Pictures. It is an anthology film consisting of five short comedy films: Adangapidari, Malai Kannan, Yama Vadhanai, Poli Samiyar and Puli Vettai. Adangapidari was directed by R. Prakash and featured Kothamangalam Subbu alongside T. Mani Iyer, T. Krishnaveni, K. N. Rajam and K. N. Kamalam. Malai Kannan was directed and photographed by Jiten Banerjee, and featured M. S. Murugesan, E. Krishnamoorthi, P. Sama, P. S. Gnanam, Nagalakshmi, Radha Bai and Meenakshi. Banerjee also directed Yama Vadhanai. Poli Samiyar starred N. S. Krishnan, T. A. Mathuram, T. S. Durairaj and M. R. Swaminathan. In the books Memories of Madras by Randor Guy and Sadhanaigal Padaitha Thamizh Thiraipada Varalaru by Film News Anandan, it is not mentioned who directed Poli Samiyar and Puli Vettai. The whole film was shot at Newton Studios in Madras (now Chennai). It is widely recognised as the first anthology film in India.

== Release and reception ==
Sirikkadhey was released on 23 December 1939, and was distributed by Vasan through Gemini Pictures Circuit. Vasan promoted the film through cartoon-based advertisements drawn by Mali, a cartoonist. It became a major commercial success, with Poli Samiyar being the most popular of the five segments. Guy considered the novelty of the cartoon advertisement campaign to be instrumental in the film's success. The success of Sirikkadhey led to more anthology films being made in Tamil cinema until the mid-1940s, when it went out of fashion.

== Bibliography ==
- Guy, Randor (2016). Gopal, T. S. (ed.). Memories of Madras: Its Movies, Musicians & Men of Letters. Chennai: Creative Workshop. ISBN 978-81-928961-7-5.
- Guy, Randor (1997). Starlight, Starbright: The Early Tamil Cinema. Amra Publishers. OCLC 52794531.
