= Vimochanam =

1940 film directed by T. Marconi

- Theatrical release poster
- Directed by: T. Marconi
- Written by: Sasi
- Starring: Hemalatha; Kanthamani; Baby Jaya; Indira; Bhagirathi
- Cinematography: T. P. Chauhan
- Music by: Ramani; Sarma Brothers (background music)
- Production companies: Jaya Films; Hindustan Films
- Release date: 30 March 1940
- Running time: 160 minutes
- Country: India
- Language: Tamil

Vimochanam (transl. Salvation) is a 1940 Indian Tamil-language film dealing with the issue of prohibition. Directed by T. Marconi, the film stars Hemalatha, Kanthamani, Baby Jaya, Indira and Bhagirathi. Released on 30 March 1940, it received significant attention because of the values it propagated, and the fact that most of the artistes were girl children. No print or stills of this film are known to survive, making it a lost film.

== Plot ==
Arumugham, a drunkard living in Salem, sells his wife's jewellery to purchase alcohol until probation in Salem offers much-needed relief. He is soon arrested for illegally trying to brew liquor. After he is released, he finds the liquor shop has become a tea-stall and his wife destitute, leading to his reform.

== Cast ==
- Hemalatha
- Kanthamani
- Baby Jaya
- Indira
- Bhagirathi

== Production ==
Vimochanam was a pro-prohibition magazine published by politician C. Rajagopalachari from his Ashram at Tiruchengode. Inspired by Rajagopalachari's anti-alcohol crusade, a film sharing its name with the magazine, starring mainly girl children belonging to the Chennai Sirumigal Sangeetha Vidyasaalai, was launched. The film was written by short story writer Sasi while T. Marconi, an Italian who was then living in Madras, directed the film. Art direction was handled by D. S. Ghadgaonkar, and cinematography by T. P. Chauhan. The film was jointly produced by Jaya and Hindustan Films.

== Soundtrack ==
The soundtrack was composed by Ramani, the founder of the Ramani School of Music, while Sasi wrote the lyrics. The background score was composed by Sarma Brothers. The film had many songs performed by Carnatic musician Lalitha Venkataraman. Popular songs include "Kallai Ozhithida Sattamondru Chennai Congress Aatchiyil Seithanarey", "Mahaan Rajaji-yai Ellorum Vaazhthuvomey" and "Naattuomey Jayakodi". The songs were released by Odeon Records.

== Release and reception ==
Vimochanam was released on 30 March 1940. The Indian Express called it "a first-class story acting as excellent propaganda for prohibition." Film historian Randor Guy said the film received significant attention because of the values it propagated, and the fact that most of the artistes were girl children. He said it would be remembered for its "meaningful lyrics, presentation and all roles being played by girl children." No print or stills of this film are known to survive, making it a lost film.
