= Pandurangan (film) =

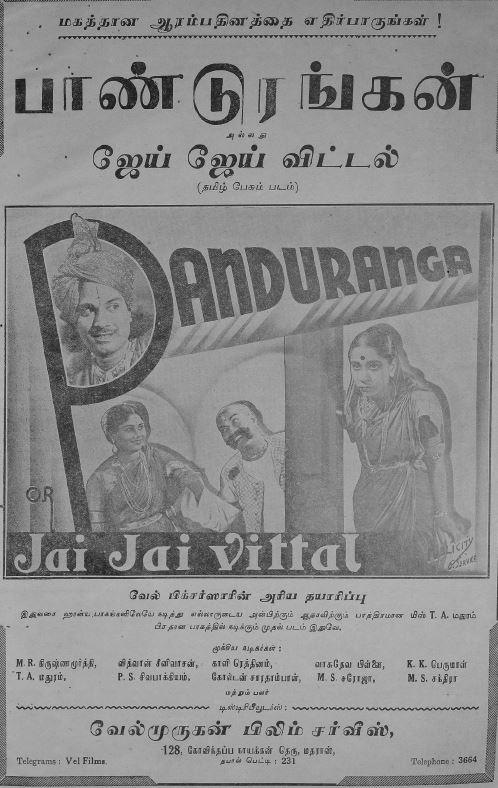
- Directed by: D. C. Gune
- Screenplay by: T. K. Sundaram
- Produced by: M. T. Rajan
- Starring: M. R. Krishnamoorthi; Kali N. Rathnam; P. S. Sivapackiam; T. A. Madhuram
- Production company: Vel Pictures
- Release date: November 11, 1939
- Country: India
- Language: Tamil

Pandurangan (Alternate name: Jai Jai Vittal) is a 1939 Indian Tamil-language film directed by D. C. Gune. The film starred M. R. Krishnamoorthi and P. S. Sivapackiam in the main roles.

== Cast ==
The following details were taken from the book "Tamil Cinema Ulagam".

Male

- M. R. Krishnamoorthi as Pundarigan
- Kali N. Rathnam as Maamaa
- Vidwan K. A. Srinivasan as Kukkudamuni
- T. N. Vasudeva Pillai as Bhandu
- K. A. Sankara Iyer as Jannu
- K. K. Perumal as Subhedar
- Prabat Venkat Rao as Lakshmana Rao
- K. P. Rajendran as Kattaiyan
- M. K. Gopalan as Indiran
- V. M. Ezhumalai as Cook
- N. Ramasamy Pillai as Hanumanthan

Female

- P. S. Sivapackiam as Chamalai
- T. A. Madhuram as Jakka
- Golden P. Sarathambal as Sathiyavathi
- M. S. Chandrabai as Indirani
- M. S. Saroja as Rasika
- K. K. Krishnaveni as Ranjitham
- R. Kanthamani as Sarasangi
- M. V. Sulochanai as Idaichchi

== Production ==
The film was produced by M. T. Rajan under the banner Vel Pictures and was directed by D. C. Gune. The film was censored on 31 October 1939 and was released on 11 November 1939. The total length of the film was 17,964 feet. The screenplay was written by T. K. Sundaram.

== Soundtrack ==
The lyrics were penned by T. K. Sundaram and Papanasam Sivan who also tuned the songs. There were 25 songs in the film sung by M. R. Krishnamoorthi, Kali N Rathnam, Vidwan K. A. Srinivasan, K. P. Rajendran, P. S. Sivapackiam, T. A. Madhuram, Golden P. Sarathambal, M. V. Sulochana, M. S. Chandrabai and M. S. Saroja.
