= Dumbachary =

Dambachary or Uthama Manaivi
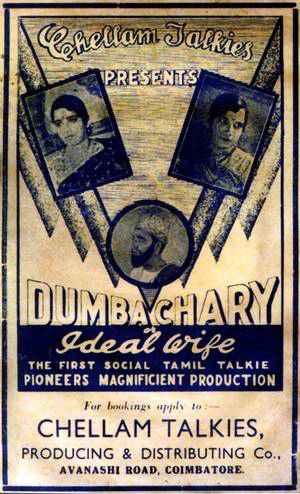
- Film Poster
- Directed by: M. L. Tandon
- Written by: Thiruvetriyur Kasiviswanatha Mudaliar
- Based on: Dambachary Vilasam (play) by Thiruvetriyur Kasiviswanatha Mudaliar
- Produced by: A. N. Maruthachalam Chettiar
- Starring: P. S. Rathna Bai; P. S. Saraswathi Bai; M. R. Krishnamurthi
- Production company: Chellam Talkies
- Distributed by: Chellam Talkies
- Release date: 1935
- Country: India
- Language: Tamil

Dambachary (transl. a vain man) is a 1935 Tamil-language film directed by Manik Lal Tandon. The film stars M. R. Krishnamuthi, P. S. Rathna Bai and P. S. Saraswathi Bai. Rathna Bai and Saraswathi Bai are well known as the Palayamkottai sisters.

== Plot ==
The story is of a man who spends the wealth of his father on his mistress while neglecting his wife. Later he realizes his folly and returns to a happy life with his wife.

== Cast ==
Male cast

- C. S. Shamanna (in seven roles)
- M. R. Krishnamurthi as Dumbachary
- M. S. Raghavan as Clown
- M. S. Murugesan as Clown
- Rangasami Naicker on Harmonium
- K. V. Naidu on Tabla

Female cast

- P. S. Rathna Bai as Gunabhushani
- P. S. Saraswathi Bai as Madanasundari

Dance

- Ragini Devi

== Production ==
After Talkies were introduced in Tamil cinema, almost all the films produced were based on mythological stories. This is the first film based on contemporary life of the time. The film was produced in Pioneer Film Studios in Calcutta (now Kolkata) by Chellam Talkies as there were no studios located in Chennai during those early years of Tamil cinema.

The writer, Thiruvetriyur Kasiviswanatha Mudaliar was a well-known playwright and he was also a member of the Brahmo Samaj movement. He also wrote on female education, widow marriage etc. He died in October 1871 aged 66. His play Dambachary Vilasam was staged several times repeatedly.

The film had an alternate title Uthama Manaivi which means Ideal Wife. It was commonplace those days to give an alternate title to a film.

== Soundtrack ==
Though the theme of the story was 'social', the film had as many as 38 songs like any other mythological story films of that time. Most of the artistes were Carnatic singers and the audience expected them to sing more rather than 'talk'. However, none of the songs in this film became popular.

== Reception ==
The film is remembered for the story line and the remarkable performance by M. R. Krishnamurthi and the Palayamkottai sisters.
