= Manik Lal Tandon =

M. L. Tandon, (Manik Lal Tandon) was one of the early movie directors of Tamil and Telugu films. He is considered one of the pioneers in social-realist film of Tamil cinema.

== Early life ==
Manik Lal Tandon is from Mumbai (then called Bombay). Tandon was one of the first Indians to study film making in the United States. He studied at University of Southern California in Los Angeles. There he made student films and became the first Indian to work in Hollywood. After returning to India he made many successful movies in Tamil in the early Indian cinema industry. His classmates at the United States were Michael Omalov and Ellis R. Dungan. Tandon invited both of them to work in Indian cinema industry.

== Filmography ==
- Bama Vijayam (1934)
- Nandanar (1935)
- Dumbachary (1935)
- Bhakta Nandanar (1935)
- Thukkaram (1938)
- Yayathi (1938)
- Arundhathi (1934)
- Raja Rajeswari (1944) along with T. R. Sundaram
- Valmiki (1946)
- Deenabandhu (1942)
- Deivaneethi (1947)
- Devadasi along with T. V. Sundaram (1948)
