= Thiruneelakantar =

- Theatrical release poster
- Directed by: Raja Sandow
- Screenplay by: Elangovan
- Produced by: M. K. Thyagaraja Bhagavathar
- Starring: M. K. Thyagaraja Bhagavathar; Tirunelveli Paapa; "Yaanai" Vaidyanatha Iyer; S. S. Rajamani; Serukalathur Sama; N. S. Krishnan; T. A. Mathuram
- Cinematography: Jitan Banerji
- Edited by: R. S. Mani
- Music by: Papanasam Sivan
- Production company: Trichy Thyagaraj Films Ltd
- Release date: 9 September 1939
- Running time: 148 Minutes
- Country: India
- Language: Tamil

Thiruneelakantar is a 1939 Indian Tamil-language devotional film directed by Raja Sandow and starring M. K. Thyagaraja Bhagavathar. The film, based on the life of Tirunilakanta Nayanar, was a big hit and was known for Thyagaraja Bhagavathar's acting apart from his songs. The noted nadaswaram player T. N. Rajarathinam Pillai makes a guest appearance.

== Cast ==
- M. K. Thyagaraja Bhagavathar as Thiruneelakantar
- Sirukalathur Sama as Siva Yogi
- Thirunelveli Papa as Neelaya Thatchi
- N. S. Krishnan as Chokan
- T. A. Mathuram as Bommi
- Kothamangalam Subbu as temple priest
- T. S. Durairaj
- R. Balasaraswathi as Saraswathi
- S. S. Rajamani as Kalavathi

== Soundtrack ==
Soundtrack was composed by Papanasam Sivan. The song "Dheena Karunakaraney" was well received and became a cult classic. The song Pavazhamaal is a Thiruvisaippa composed by Thiruvaliyamudhanar. (Note: See this) T. N. Rajarathnam Pillai set the tune for this in the raga Nattai.

Saavn track listing
No.	Title	Singer(s)	Length
1.	"Saraasarangal"	M. K. Thyagaraja Bhagavathar	02:49
2.	"Un Azhagai Kaana"	M. K. Thyagaraja Bhagavathar	03:01
3.	"Dheena Karunakarane"	M. K. Thyagaraja Bhagavathar	03:08
4.	"Chidhambara Naadha"	M. K. Thyagaraja Bhagavathar	03:22
5.	"Pavazhamaal"	M. K. Thyagaraja Bhagavathar	03:38
6.	"Orunaal Oru Pozhuthu"	M. K. Thyagaraja Bhagavathar	03:15

== Release ==
Randor Guy of The Hindu wrote "Remembered for MKT’s scintillating songs and the comedy by NSK-TAM."
