= Sri Ramanujar =

- Directed by: A. Narayanan
- Screenplay by: (Dialogues) Va. Raa.
- Based on: Hindu theologian, philosopher Ramanuja
- Produced by: Seethalakshmi
- Starring: Sangu Subramaniam; N. Seethalakshmi; N. Ramarathinam; R. Kamalambal
- Cinematography: Velappan
- Edited by: N. K. Gopal
- Music by: (lyricist: Bharathidasan
- Production companies: S. L. Films & Srinivas Cinetone
- Release date: 1938
- Country: British India
- Language: Tamil

Sri Ramanujar is a 1938 Indian, Tamil language film was directed by A. Narayanan. The film featured Sangu Subramaniam, N. Seethalakshmi, N. Ramarathinam and others.

== Plot ==
The film portrayed the life story of Hindu theologian, philosopher Ramanuja.

== Cast ==
The following list was adapted from the database of Film News Anandan

Male cast

- Sangu Subramaniam
- N. Ramarathinam
- Srinivasa Varadhan
- N. Pichumoorthy
- Chellappa (not V. A. Chellappa)

Female cast

- N. Seethalakshmi
- R. Kamalambal
- G. A. Gnanambal
- T. S. Krishnaveni

== Production ==
The film was produced by Seethalakshmi under the banner YESSEL FILM CO and Srinivasa Cinetone. The film was directed by A. Narayanan. Va. Raa. wrote the dialogues. Velappan was in charge of cinematography while the editing was done by N. K. Gopal. Meenakshi Narayanan handled the audiography.

A short film titled Athirshta Nakshathiram was also shown along with the main film.

== Soundtrack ==
There were no separate music directors at that period. Lyrics were penned by Bharathidasan while the actors themselves rendered the songs with the company orchestra as background music.
