= Veera Jagathis =

- Directed by: T. P. Kailasam; R. Prakash
- Starring: V. S. M. Rajarama Iyer; M. G. Ramachandran
- Production company: V. S. Talkies
- Release date: 1938
- Country: India
- Language: Tamil

Veera Jagathis (transl. Valiant Jagathis) is a 1938 Tamil language film directed by T. P. Kailasam and R. Prakash. It stars V. S. M. Rajarama Iyer and M. G. Ramachandran.

== Production ==
Veera Jagathis was directed by T. P. Kailasam and R. Prakash. It was produced under the banner V. S. Talkies. V. S. M. Rajarama Iyer and M. G. Ramachandran were actors in the film. The length of the film was 10,444 feet (3,183 m).
