= Kumbakonam K. Bhanumathi =

Indian dancer (1922–2006)

- Born: K. Bhanumathi; 1922; Kumbakonam, Madras Presidency, British India
- Died: 2006 (aged 83–84)
- Occupation: Bharatanatyam dancer
- Awards: Sangeet Natak Akademi Award (1973)

Kumbakonam K. Bhanumathi (1922–2006) was an Indian bharathanatyam dancer from Kumbakonam, Tamil Nadu. In 1973, she received the Sangeet Natak Akademi Award for Bharatanatyam.

== Biography ==
Kumbakonam K. Bhanumathi was born in 1922 in Kumbakonam in present-day Tamil Nadu, into a family of traditional dancers. She was born in a devadasi (traditional temple dancer) family. Bhanumathi received her training in Bharatanatyam from Papanasam Vadivelu Nattuvanar, and under him she had her arangetram (first stage performance) at the age of ten. Later she studied under Shanmukha Sundaram Nattuvanar and Mylapore Gowri Ammal also.

Bhanumathi died in 2006.

== Career ==
In her early years, Bhanumathi danced with her aunt Varalakshmi, and they were known as the 'Varalakshmi Bhanumati Duet'.

She danced in many parts of the country, and also in Ceylon for 25 years. In 1938, she played the female lead in the Tamil film Jalaja, which was based on Bharatanatyam.

In the early 1930s, Bhanumathi was a fierce rival to Balasaraswathi, another noted dancer of her time. Bhanumathi who studied vocal music from Balasaraswathi's mother, Jayammal, would sing while she danced.

In 1932, E. Krishna Iyer introduced her to an American woman, who liked her dancing and offered her a two-year contract to perform in the United States.

Kumbakonam Varalakshmi and Bhanumathi are two figures who were part of the transformation of Bharatanatyam. The transformation of Bharatanatyam, both before and after independence, saw many changes in the attire of the dancers. This was warmly welcomed by Kumbakonam Bhanumathi, and she began wearing the stitched attire designed by dancer Rukmini Devi Arundale. Meanwhile, dancers like Balasaraswathi advocated for traditional attire.

== Awards and honors ==
Bhanumathi has been honoured by various cultural organisations, including the Tamil Nadu Sangeetha Nataka Sangham. In 1973, she received the Sangeet Natak Akademi Award for Bharatanatyam.

== Works on her ==
In 1993, Sujatha Vijayaraghavan made a documentary on Bhanumathi, as part of her senior fellowship Padavarnam project.
