= Bhakta Nandanar =

1935 film by Maniklal Dandan

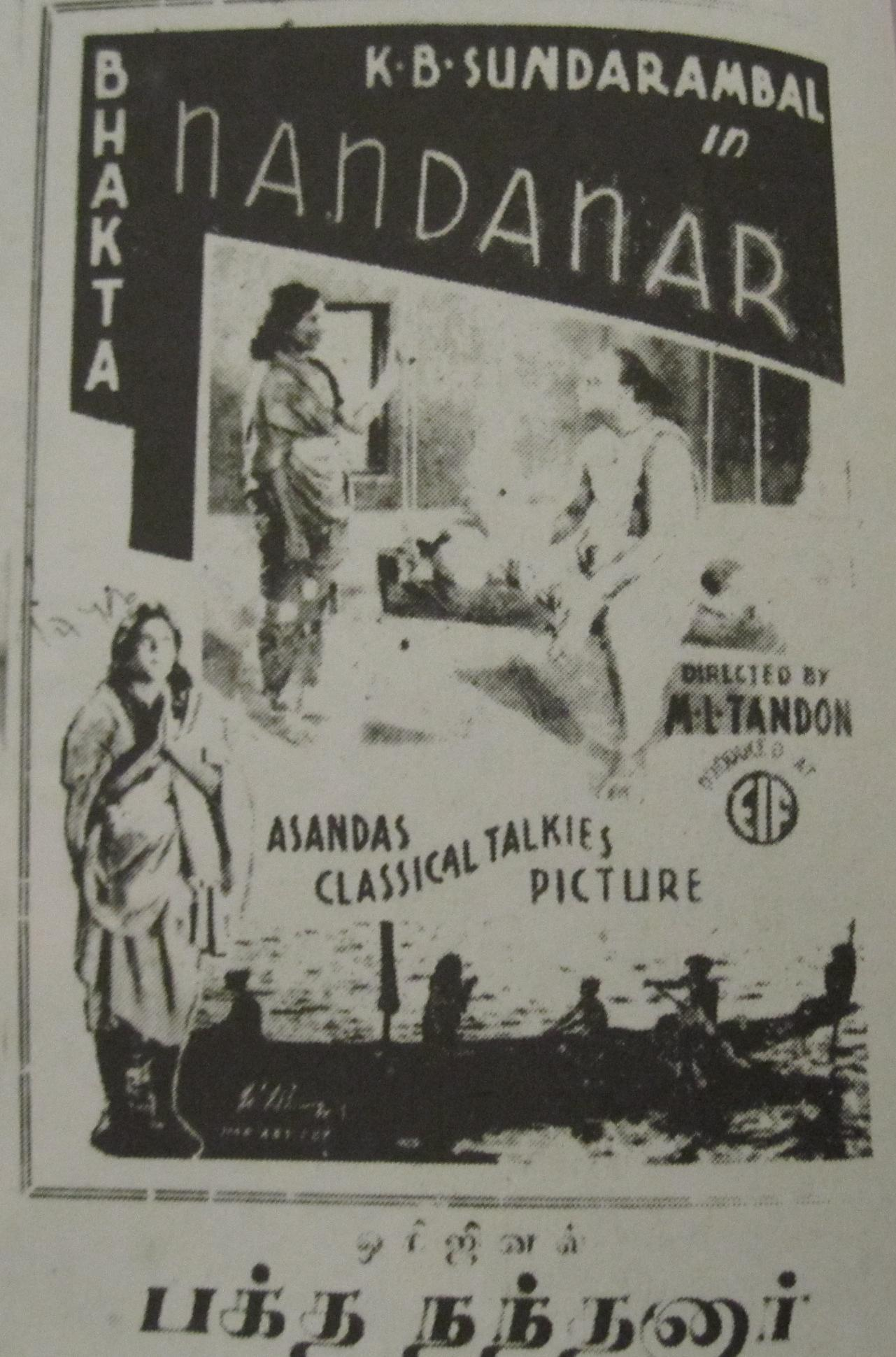
- Poster
- Directed by: Manik Lal Tandon
- Starring: K. B. Sundarambal; Maharajapuram Viswanatha Iyer
- Production company: Asandas Classical Talkies
- Release date: 1935
- Country: India
- Language: Tamil
- Budget: ₹ 3 lakh

Bhakta Nandanar (transl. Devotee Nandanar) is a 1935 Tamil-language film directed by Manik Lal Tandon. It marked the cinematic debut of the Carnatic singer and stage artist K. B. Sundarambal. She was paid a then unprecedented ₹100,000 (equivalent of ₹60 million (2013 prices)) as salary for this film. This was also the first film for Ellis R. Dungan. No print of the film is known to survive, making it a lost film.

== Plot ==
The story is based on the life of Shaivite saint Nandanar (also known as Thirunaalai Povar – thee who pilgrims tomorrow) and his becoming of a Naayanar.

== Cast ==
- K. B. Sundarambal as Nandanar
- Maharajapuram Viswanatha Iyer as Vedhiyar

== Production ==
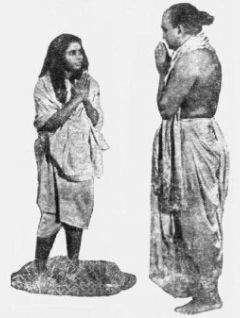
K. B. Sundarambal and Maharajapuram Viswanatha Iyer in Bhakta Nandanar

K. B. Sundarambal had retired from stage performances in 1932 after the death of her husband S. G. Kittappa. Hassandas, a textile magnate from Madras and a member of Chellaram business family, was keen on making a film with Sundarambal in the lead. She was initially reluctant to star in the film and refused even the recommendation of her mentor S. Satyamurti. Hassandas persisted and to discourage him she offered to act in the film if he could pay one lakh Rupees. Hassandas agreed to pay her and the film was made.

The film was directed by Manik Lal Tandon with Ellis Dungan shooting many scenes in his absence. Sundarambal was cast as a man – the untouchable saint Nandanar. The same story had earlier been the subject of a 1932 Tamil film of the same name. Carnatic musician Maharajapuram Viswanatha Iyer was cast as the landlord Vedhiyar. He was paid 3000 Rs as salary. The script had a scene where Iyer's character would prostrate before Nandanar. Due to the prevailing social norms and her respect for Iyer, Sundarambal refused to do the scene. Director Tandon filmed a compromise by changing the scene so that both prostrated before each other. The completed film cost ₹3 lakh (equivalent to ₹11 crore or US$1.2 million in 2026) to make and was 18000 feet long. Tunes of three songs from the 1934 Hindi film Chandidas were reused in this film.

== Reception ==
The film was released in 1935 amid great expectations from the public. It failed at the box office and received mixed reviews from the critics. Kalki Krishnamurthy made fun of it in Ananda Vikatan by claiming buffaloes and palm trees had acted well in the film. He wrote that the number one actor in the film was the coconut tree, number two was the buffalo and number three, the kid goat. The Tamil newspaper Dina Mani also gave it an unfavourable review. Writing in the April 1938 issue of the Eelakesari, Pudhumaipithan explained the reasons for its failure:

..Nandanar was released. It had beautiful scenes and melodious songs. They had made it at enormous expense. But it was not able to distinguish itself. Why? because it had a female (Sundarambal) playing a man. In a stage play, one can appreciate things like make up or facial expressions. But in a movie you have to depict Nandan's story realistically. However we try we can not picture Sundarambal as Nandanar. If we kept seeing Sundarambal and not Nandan, how can we experience Nandan's story and how can the film succeed?

However it received favourable reviews on 15 July 1935 issues of The Hindu, Tamil Nadu, Sudesamithran and Cinema Ulagam. Viswanatha Iyer was criticised by conservative brahimins of his hometown Kumbakonam for acting in the film.
