= Sethu Bandhanam (1937 film) =

- Directed by: R. Padmanabhan
- Based on: Indian Epic Ramayana
- Produced by: R. Padmanabhan
- Starring: P. B. Rangachari; Nott Annaji Rao; M. D. Parthasarathy; M. S. Mohanambal; K. S. Angamuthu
- Music by: M. D. Parthasarathy
- Production company: Oriental Films
- Release date: 10 July 1937 (India)
- Country: India
- Language: Tamil

Sethu Bandhanam is a 1937 Indian Tamil-language film based on the epic Ramayana. The film was produced and directed by R. Padmanabhan and stars P. B. Rangachari, Nott Annaji Rao, M. D. Parthasarathy and M. S. Mohanambal. No print of the film is known to survive, making it a lost film.

== Plot ==
The story is the part of Ramayana where Rama builds a bridge between India and Lanka to go and take back his wife Sita who was abducted by Ravana, the King of Lanka. The bridge is called Adam's Bridge and also Sethubandhanam.

== Cast ==
The list is compiled from The Hindu article and from the database of Film News Anandan

- P. B. Rangachari
- Nott Annaji Rao
- M. D. Parthasarathy
- M. S. Mohanambal
- M. A. Sandow
- Kulathu Mani
- M.R. Subramaniam
- T. K. Kannammal
- K. S. Angamuthu
- Bhagirathi
- M. S. Ramachandran

== Production ==
The film had an alternate title Sethu Bandhan. R. Padmanabhan also produced a comedy short film Aasai and released together with the main film. It was customary those days to 'attach' a short comedy along with the main films. T. N. Kamalaveni and Puliyur Duraiswami Ayya played the lead roles in this short film.

The film was remade in Telugu with the same title Sethu Bandhanam by R. Padmanabhan in 1946.

== Soundtrack ==
Music was composed by M. D. Parthasarathy while the lyrics were written by Chidambaram Vaidyanatha Sarma. P. B. Rangachari, M. D. Parthasarathy and M. S. Mohanambal sang most of the songs.

== Lost film ==
Except for some stills and a few records, no print of the film is known to survive, making it a lost film.

== Reception ==
The film was a success and is remembered for the on-screen narration of the epic by R. Pathmanabhan "and the impressive acting by Rangachari, Parthasarathy and Mohanambal."
