= Jalaja (film) =

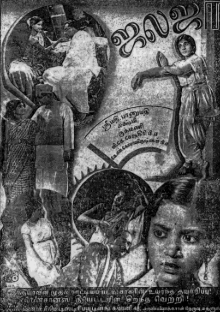
- Promotional poster
- Original title: ஜலஜா அல்லது நாட்டிய மஹிமை
- Directed by: R. R. Gautam; G. K. Seshagiri
- Screenplay by: Manjeri S. Isvaran; Dr. V. Raghavan; G. K. Seshagiri
- Story by: Manjeri S. Isvaran; Dr. V. Raghavan; G. K. Seshagiri
- Produced by: G. K. Seshagiri
- Starring: Bhanumathi; Lakshmi; G. K. Seshagiri; K. S. Gopalakrishan
- Cinematography: Rajnikant Pandya; Minoo Billimoria
- Edited by: Fakir Mohammad
- Music by: A. N. Kalyanasundaram
- Production company: Sagar Renaissance Theatre
- Distributed by: General Film Distributing Co.
- Release date: May 1938
- Country: India
- Language: Tamil

Jalaja or Natya Mahimai (transl. Jalaja or The Glory of Dance) is a 1938 Indian Tamil-language dance film written by Manjeri S. Isvaran, Dr. V. Raghavan and G. K. Seshagiri. The film was directed by R. R. Gautam and Seshagiri and produced by the Sagar Renaissance Theatre, a joint production by Seshagiri's Renaissance Theatre and Sagar Movietone. It stars Bhanumathi, Lakshmi, G. K. Seshagiri and K. S. Gopalakrishan (Note: Not K. S. Gopalakrishnan) in lead roles. The film is marked as India's first dance film. It is also dedicated to Bhanumathi's cousin, Bharatanatya Art Expert Srimathi Varalakshmi, who died early on in the film's production. No print of the film is known to survive, making it a lost film.

== Cast ==
Cast according to the song book

- Bhanumathi as Jalaja
- G. K. Seshagiri as Rajagopalan
- Lakshmi as Lalitha
- K. S. Gopalakrishan as Mudaliar
- Janaki (Note: Nungambakkam Janaki, Kumari Rukmani's mother) as Duraikannu
- V. Ganesa Iyer as Priest
- Rukmini as Rukmini
- M. K. Venkatapathi as Azhagappan
- R. Venkatachalamaiah as Sivarama Iyer
- S. R. Krishna Iyengar as Kittu
- R. Ramanujachari as Agent Iyengar
- Bhudo Advani as Mudaliar's Servant
- Vaithi as Mudaliar's Servant
- Sadasivan as Mudaliar's Servant
- Pankajam as Pankajam
- Kokilam as Singer
- K. S. Ramamurthi as Station Master
- S. Rajagopalan as Sundaram
- Sripada Shankar as Police Deputy Commissioner
- M. Viswanathan as Police Inspector
- G. Kalyanasundaram as Police Inspector
- A. Sundaram as Police Inspector

== Production ==
The film was produced by the Sagar Renaissance Theatre, a joint production by G. K. Seshagiri's Renaissance Theatre and Sagar Movietone. It was directed by R. R. Gautam and G. K. Seshagiri, who was also the owner of The Renaissance Theatre. Manjeri S. Isvaran and R. S. Murthi were assistant directors. The story and dialogues were written by Manjeri S. Isvaran, Dr. V. Raghavan and G. K. Seshagiri. The film was shot at Sagar Studios in Bombay and the photography was done by Rajnikant Pandya and Minoo Billimoria. The audiography was handled by V. M. Desai, Dinshaw Billimoria and Reuben Moses. Roora Mistry took care of the film's settings while Fakir Mohammad handled the editing. The film was processed by Gangadhar Narvekar and Pranchavan Shukla. While the song book only credits S. Shanmukham as the Nattuvanar in the orchestra, Film News Anandan credits him as just the dance choreographer. Hari Krishnan believes that S. Shanmukham is actually Shanmukhasundara Nattuvanar of Thiruppanandal, who was an associate of Vadivelu Pilai, the duo's choreographer before he died in 1937. G. K. Seshagiri played the hero, Rajagopalan, while Varalakshmi of the Varalakshmi-Bhanumathi duo was hired to play the heroine, Jalaja. Production began in 1937 in Bombay and on 3 November, Varalakshmi died suddenly. Her cousin Bhanumathi, known as Kumbakonam Bhanumathi, was asked to replace her role, which she accepted. The film had a second title, Natya Mahimai, meaning the glory of dance. K. S. Gopalakrishnan, a congress party worker turned film director played the Mudaliar. He is often confused with another film director, K. S. Gopalakrishnan. Bhudo Advani, a Bengali actor played one of the Mudaliar's servants. Kumari Rukmani and her mother Nungambakkam Janaki played Rukmini and Duraikannu, Jalaja's sister and mother respectively. Lakshmi, who played Rajagopalan's wife, Lalitha, was introduced in this film.

== Soundtrack ==
The music was directed by A. N. Kalyanasundaram, who also composed almost all of the songs. However, "Theruvil Varano" was composed by Muthu Thandavar. The song, "Aduvum Seivar", is an altered version of the padam, "Aduvum Solluval" composed by Subbarama Iyer. The song, "Innum Dayavu", originally composed by Ramalinga Swamigal has also been altered in the film.

A. N. K’s Orchestra

- Parur S. Anantharaman (Conductor) – Fiddle
- V. Natarajan – Fiddle
- M. R. Jayarama Sarma – Flute, Harmonium
- M. Balusami Dikshithar – Veenai
- Ponnusami Mudaliar – Gottuvadhyam
- S. Radhakrishnan – Organ, Piano, Xylophone
- M. K. Venkatapathi – Mridangam
- C. V. Mani – Mridangam, Tabla, Dholak
- S. Shanmukham – Nattuvanar

No.	Song	Singer(s)	Ragam	Composer	Length
1	"Inneramagilum"	Gramophone Plate - Kokilam	Begada	A. N. Kalyanasundaram	
2	"Kanne Varai"	Pankajam	Sindhu Bhairavi	A. N. Kalyanasundaram	
3	"Innum Dayavu"	Lakshmi, Bhanumathi	Khamas	A. N. Kalyanasundaram	
4	"Ananda Natesa"	Bhanumathi		A. N. Kalyanasundaram	
5	"Samanam Evarum"	Bhanumathi, K. S. Gopalakrishnan		A. N. Kalyanasundaram	
6	"Adum Arase"	Kokilam		A. N. Kalyanasundaram	
7	"Kadhalai Arindor"	Bhanumathi	Hamir Kalyani	A. N. Kalyanasundaram	
8	"Aduvum Seivar"	Kokila	Saurashtram	A. N. Kalyanasundaram	
9	"Theruvil Varano"	Rukmini	Khamas	Muthu Thandavar	
10	"Kadhal Kaniyai"	K. S. Gopalakrishnan		A. N. Kalyanasundaram	

== Reception ==
The film was distributed by the General Film Distributing Co., which was based in Madras. According to Hari Krishnan, "there is no information about how Jalaja fared at the box office. Regardless, the success of the film provides us with new perspectives on thinking about the ways in which Bharatanatyam was circulating in the period [during the 1930s] immediately following the work of the [Madras] Music Academy and [Rukmini Devi] Arundale." In an August 1938 Filmindia magazine, Baburao Patel reports that, "Jalaja failed to draw and people in town think that it was due to bad direction. The story is reported to be weak and a bad selection of artistes is also given as a reason." In September of the same year, Patel continues with, "the original Jalaja is now expected to be revived after a number of changes." No print of the film is known to survive, making it a lost film.
