= Chandrahasan (film) =

- Directed by: Profulla Ghosh
- Starring: Master V. N. Sundaram; P. B. Rangachari; M. R. Santhanalakshmi; P. C. Seetharaman; C. S. Saradambal; J. Susheela Devi; M. R. Subramania Mudaliar; K. S. Subramania Iyer; S. Kalyanasundaram Iyer; D. Sundaram Iyer; Master Ramudu; Miss Rajam; P. Ramaiah Sastrigal
- Release date: 1936
- Country: India
- Language: Tamil

Chandrahasan is a 1936 Tamil-language film directed by Bengali filmmaker Profulla Ghosh. The film star Master V. N. Sundaram, P. B. Rangachari, M. R. Santhanalakshmi, P. C. Seetharaman, C. S. Saradambal, J. Susheela Devi, M. R. Subramania Mudaliar, K. S. Subramania Iyer, S. Kalyanasundaram Iyer, D. Sundaram Iyer, Master Ramudu, Miss Rajam and P. Ramaiah Sastrigal.

== Plot ==
The plot revolves around a boy Chandrahasan (played by V. N. Sundaram) who is destined to become the king of a country. Aware of Chandrahasan's destiny, a minister (played by P. B. Rangachari) tries to kill him but is unsuccessful. Chandrahasan eventually becomes king and the minister is punished. C. S. Saradambal plays his love interest while M. R. Santhanalakshmi plays a princess, both of whom he marries.

== Cast ==
The following list was adapted from the database of Film News Anandan

- V. N. Sundaram
- M. R. Santhanalakshmi
- P. B. Rangachari
- C. S. Sarathambal
- P. C. Seetharaman
- D. Susila Devi
- D. Sundaram
- Rajam

== Soundtrack ==
No music director was credited. There were 41 songs and the actors sang to the ragas set by the lyricists to the accompaniment of an orchestra. Madurai Baskaradas penned all the songs except one that was penned by K. S. Subramania Iyer. The orchestra consisted of:

- Sangeetha Bhushanam T. S. Krishnasamy Iyer - violin
- D. T. Ramakrishna Pillai - Harmonium
- R. Sridhara Rao - Tabla

== Other versions ==
The film is based on the story of Prince Chandrahasa, a popular local legend. The film celluloid version of the tale was made in 1921 by Kanjilal Rathod, following by two other silent versions, in 1928 and 1929 by Kanjilal Rathod and Dadasaheb Phalke, respectively. In 1933, Sarvotham Bhadani made the first Hindi version of the tale. The Tamil version which came in 1936 was second talking picture to be made on the tale. This was followed by a Telugu version in 1941, a second Hindi version in 1947 and a bilingual in Telugu and Kannada by B. S. Ranga in 1965.
