= Rajambal (1935 film) =

- Directed by: A. Narayanan
- Screenplay by: K. V. Santhanakrishna Naidu
- Story by: J. R. Rangaraju
- Based on: Rajambal novel and stage play by J. R. Rangaraju
- Starring: P. S. Srinivasa Rao; K. N. Rajalakshmi; Krishna Iyengar; Rajam
- Release date: 1935
- Running time: 177 mins. (16000 ft.)
- Country: India
- Language: Tamil

Rajambal is a 1935 Indian, Tamil language film directed by A. Narayanan. The film stars P. S. Srinivasa Rao and K. N. Rajalakshmi.

== Plot ==
The story is of a judicial officer who used his official powers to meet his own ends.

== Cast ==
List adapted from the database of Film News Anandan.

Male cast

- P. S. Srinivasa Rao
- Krishna Iyengar
- M. N. Srinivasan

Female cast

- K. N. Rajalakshmi
- Rajam

== Production ==
The story was first published as a novel authored by J. G. Rangaraju and then was staged as a drama.

This is the first edition of the film produced by Coimbatore Talkies and directed by A. Narayanan. K. V. Santhanakrishna Naidu wrote the dialogues. A second edition, Rajambal was produced and released in 1951.

== Soundtrack ==
K. V. Santhanakrishna Naidu wrote the lyrics too. At that time there were no playback singing and no separate music directors. The lyricists wrote the lyrics and set the tune. Artistes sang with their own voice. Background music score was done by the studio orchestras.
