= Radha Kalyanam (1935 film) =

- Film Poster
- Directed by: C. K. Sachi
- Starring: S. Rajam, M. R. Santhanalakshmi
- Music by: Harikesanallur L. Muthiah Bhagavathar; Narayana Iyer
- Production company: Meenakshi Films
- Distributed by: National Movietone
- Release date: 1935
- Country: India
- Language: Tamil

Radha Kalyanam was a 1935 Tamil-language film directed by C. K. Sathasivan. It stars S. Rajam and M. R. Santhanalakshmi. Rajam and Santhanalakshmi played Hinduism deities Krishna and Radha respectively. The film was a box-office failure. The film had a few sequences in color.

== Cast ==
- S. Rajam as Krishna
- M. R. Santhanalakshmi as Radha
- K. S. Devudu Iyer as Sage Narada
- C. M. Durai as Lord Vishnu
- Srijanaki
- B. Saradha
- 'Master' T.V. Krishnamurthi
- H. Yegneswara Bhagavathar
- 'Comedian' K.S. Sankara Iyer
- M. Lakshmanan
- S. Rajamani
- K. Shanthadevi
- R. Rajam,
- Soundaravalli
- K. Lakshmi
- Meenambal
