= P. V. Rao =

- Born: Pothula Vigneswara Rao; 1949 May 10; Devaguptam village, Amalapuram, East Godavari district, India
- Died: 22 December 2005 (aged 56); New Delhi, India
- Occupations: Dalit Social activist & Founder President of Mala Mahanadu
- Spouse: Prameeladevi

Pothula Vigneswara Rao spearheaded the Dalit Mala Mahanadu movement in Andhra Pradesh to fight against the categorisation of Scheduled Castes into A, B, C, D groups.

== Mala Mahanadu Movement ==
The 20 per cent Dalit population of Andhra Pradesh was a traditional vote-bank for the Indian National Congress party since the Independence of India in 1947. In 1998, Chandrababu Naidu of the Telugu Desam Party felt that this support needed to be split if he was to establish his party strongly in the state. Sowing the seeds of separate reservations benefits, Naidu enticed the Madigas with separation of welfare, seats in educational institutions and reservation. He brought in a former naxalite, Manda Krishna Madiga to superhead the MRPS movement for the categorisation of Scheduled Castes into A, B, C, D groups. The then Chandrababu Naidu government classified 59 sub-castes in four groups according to their population and allocated their share. Thus, 12 castes in group A got 1 per cent, Madigas and 17 other castes in group B got 7 per cent, Malas and 24 others in group C got 6 per cent and four castes in group D got 1 per cent.

Malas now have to limit their share to only 6% out of 15%, this has led to a wide resentment among Malas. Rao opposed former Andhra Pradesh chief minister Chandrababu Naidu's division of scheduled castes in the state into sub-groups. He was dismissed from service for opposing the Naidu government's divisive politics. Rao later formed the Mala Mahanadu and led the caste consolidation of the Malas, a numerically significant and educated community.

The Mala Mahanadu's fight against classification of SCs began in 1997 when it first contested a GO issued by the Chandrababu Naidu government. When the High Court struck down the GO, the government promulgated an ordinance which was later enacted by the Assembly. A five-member bench of the High Court upheld the legislation. In 2001, Mala Mahanadu went to the Supreme Court the movement knocked the doors of the courts and a five-judge Constitution bench of the Supreme Court on Friday 7 November 2004 unanimously decided in the E V Chinnaiah vs State of A P case that such a micro-classification of scheduled castes into sub-groups was unconstitutional. The court said untouchability being the sole criterion, further classification of scheduled castes violated Articles 14, 15 and 16 of the Constitution. It thereby affected the basic structure of the Constitution.

The Supreme Court struck down the order in 2004.

== Unity among Malas and Madigas ==
The agitation by Madigas had created deep divisions between the Mala and Madiga dominant castes over the issue. Rao has always advocated for the unity among Malas and Madigas. He appealed to Madigas, the largest SC group that had waged a long-drawn struggle for categorisation, to put behind their differences and join hands to fight for the larger cause of empowerment of SCs.

== Death ==
Rao died of a heart attack in New Delhi on 22 December 2005. He was in New Delhi to meet several party leaders to fight against the categorisation of Scheduled Castes into A, B, C, D groups. He died at the age of 56 and was cremated according to Hindu customs. He is survived by wife and two daughters. His wife Prameela Devi contested on a PRP ticket for Amalapuram Lok Sabha constituency but lost.
