= Bhishma (1936 film) =

1936 film directed by P. Y. Altekar

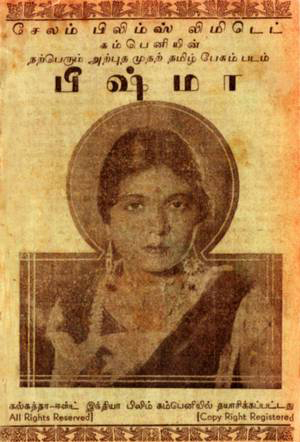
- Poster
- Directed by: P. Y. Altekar
- Starring: M. S. Damodara Rao; Kanthimathi Bai; T. S. Jaya
- Production company: Salem Films
- Release date: 1936
- Country: India
- Language: Tamil

Bhishma, also known as Bhishma Pratigna (transl. Bhishma's Vow) is a 1936 Indian Hindu mythological film directed by P. Y. Altekar. It is based on the character of the same name from the Indian epic Mahabharata.

== Plot ==
Shanthanu Maharaja is in love with the river goddess Ganga who drowns their seven daughters at birth. Their eighth child is Bhishma. To please his father and keep his promise to his mother, Bhishma vows not to marry.

== Cast ==
- M. S. Damodara Rao as Shanthanu Maharaja
- Kanthimathi Bai as Ganga
- T. S. Jaya as Sathyavathi

== Production ==
Bhishma is the first Tamil film to be based on the character of the same name from the Indian epic Mahabharata. It was directed by P. Y. Altekar, and produced by Salem Films. The film had an alternate title, Bhishma Pratigna. Shooting took place at the Calcutta-based East India Film Studios.

== Soundtrack ==
No known information on the film's music composer and lyricist remains, although film historian Randor Guy believes both were done by Papanasam Sivan. There were as many as 23 songs, with one consisting of Hindi words such as acchha (good), kushi (happiness) and besh besh.

== Release and reception ==
According to Randor Guy, the film was a reasonable success "mainly because of the familiar story and songs".
