= R. Padmanaban =

Indian film director

R. Padmanabhan (1895–1983) was an Indian film director who worked in Tamil films. One of the pioneers of the South Indian film industry, he initially started distribution of silent films and later directed and produced his own films.

== Filmography ==
- Draupadi Vastrapaharanam (1934)
- Kumari (1952)
