= Serukalathur Sama =

Indian stage and film actor

Serukulathur Sama
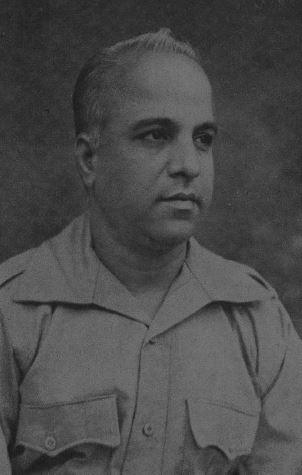
- Serukulathur Sama in 1943
- Born: Swaminathan Vaidyanathan; 26 June 1904; Serukalathur, Thanjavur district, Madras State, India
- Died: 11 January 1963; Madras, Tamil Nadu, India
- Occupations: Actor, Singer

Swaminathan Vaidyanathan (26 June 1904—11 January 1963), known by his stage name Serukulathur Sama, was an Indian stage and film actor. He was primarily known for playing the role of the Hindu god Krishna in Tamil language Hindu mythological films of the 1930s and 1940s.

== Early life ==
Born in the village Serukalathur in Thiruvarur district to Mirasudar (Manager of own farm) Vaidyanadhaiyer, his birth name was Swaminathan. When he was 5 years old his mother died and his father remarried. So Swaminathan went to live with his uncle in Thanjavur. He learned Carnatic music along with academic studies. After passing the S. S. L. C. examination, he married and had 3 children. He went to Madras in search of employment. There he worked as a clerk for 2 months in the office of the Indian National Congress and then for 10 years in the Cosmopolitan Club.

== Film career ==
He was a handsome person and had the ability to sing in bass voice. While he was working in the Cosmopolitan club he came in contact with a member of the club Ananthanarayanan Narayanan, who established Srinivasa Cinetone, the first sound recording studio of south India in Kilpauk. Narayanan introduced Swaminathan into films. Swaminathan, now known as Serukalathur Sama, had good looks and singing talent. He was cast as Lord Krishna in most of the films. Sama's role as great Tamil poet Kambar of 12th century, in the movie Ambikapathi was much appreciated.

== Film Producer and Director ==
With his success as an actor he embarked on production of films. He leased National Movietone Studio on Poonamallee High Road, Chennai and changed its name as Bharat Cinetone. His first production was Shylock, (Tamilized as Shailak) adapted from Shakespeare's The Merchant Of Venice. He directed the film along with his lawyer friend and signed as Sama-Ramu.

== Filmography ==
Year	Title	Role	Notes
1934	Draupadi Vastrapaharanam	Krishna	
1935	Maayaa Bazaar		
1936	Bama Parinayam		
1937	Chintamani	Krishna	
1937	Ambikapathy	Kambar	
1938	Vishnu Leela		
1939	Thiruneelakantar		
1940	Krishnan Thoothu		
1940	Parasuramar		
1940	Sakuntalai	Kanwa Rishi	
1940	Shailak	Shailak	
1941	Subadra Arjuna		
1941	Thiruvalluvar		
1942	Manonmani	Sundara Munivar	
1942	Nandanar	Vedhiyar	
1942	Rajasooyam		
1943	Arundhathi		
1943	Sivakavi		
1944	Baktha Hanuman		
1944	Bharthruhari	Bharthruhari	
1944	Rajarajeshwari		
1945	Bhakta Kalathi		
1945	Burma Rani	Buddhist monk	
1945	Meera		
1946	Aaravalli Sooravalli		
1948	Jeevajothi		
1948	Raja Mukthi		
1950	Beedala Patlu		
1950	Ezhai Padum Padu		
1950	Vijayakumari		
1951	Marmayogi	Sage	
1954	Panam Paduthum Padu		
1962	Manithan Maravillai		
1962	Pattinathar	Sivasarmar	
