= Randor Guy =

Indian film critic (1937–2023)

Madabhushi Rangadorai (Tamil: மாதபூஷி ரங்கதுரை; 8 November 1937 – 23 April 2023), better known by his pen name Randor Guy (Tamil: ராண்டார் கை), was an Indian lawyer, columnist and film and legal historian associated with the English language newspaper The Hindu. He was also the official editor of the weekly column "Blast from the Past" that appeared in The Hindu for many years; in this series Randor Guy wrote about not so well known details of Tamil movies and the personalities (producers, directors, movie stars, lyricists, featured songs and box office collections), produced since the mid-1930s to the late 1960s.

== Early life ==
Randor Guy was born on 8 November 1937. His birth name was Rangadorai, but his pen name (an anglicized anagram of his birth name) later became official. He graduated with BSc and B. L. from Madras University and commenced his career as a lawyer. After practising as a lawyer for a short time, he quit his job and joined a firm called Paterson and Co. where he worked for five years. In 1976, he resigned to devote all his time to writing.

== Work as a film historian ==
Guy has been writing books on history and films since 1967. He became popular when his article on Frank Capra was purchased by the United States Information Agency for use as a reference work. As of 2008, he remains the only non-American whose work has been acquired as reference material by the Government of the United States of America.

Guy was a regular columnist for such newspapers as the Mylapore Times, The Hindu and The Indian Express. He also wrote for the film magazine, Screen. He wrote on a variety of topics, although he is mainly popular as a film historian and critic.

== Films ==
Guy wrote the screenplays for a few short documentaries and feature films. He also produced a few advertisement films. In 1999, he scripted a 100-minute feature film in English titled Tales of The Kama Sutra: The Perfumed Garden for a Hollywood film company, directed by Jag Mundhra. It was subsequently dubbed into Hindi, Tamil and Telugu as Brahmachari. He later worked with the film's cinematographer, Ashok Kumar, on his Tamil production, Kaama (1999). The film was also dubbed into Telugu and Hindi as Kama and Kama Tantra, respectively. He has written a Sinhalese film called Paradise Peak based on a best-selling crime novel written by him. His recent works include Kamasutra Nights: Maya starring actress Namitha. Maya is Namitha's first film in English.

== Death ==
Guy died on 23 April 2023, at the age of 85.

== Awards and felicitations ==
On 12 November 2007, during a function commemorating the fifth anniversary of Samudra, a magazine dedicated to art and culture, Guy was awarded the Gnana Samudra award in recognition of his contributions to the arts.

== Books ==
- While the Breakers Roared. 1967. (Fiction)
- Indian Ribaldry. C. E. Tuttle Co. 1970. ISBN 0-8048-0906-2.
- Chaya. 1980. (Fiction – Telugu)
- Kasi. 1981. (Fiction – Telugu)
- Madhuri Oru Madhiri. 1982. (True Crime-Tamil)
- B.N. Reddi: a monograph. National Film Archive of India. 1985. ISBN 81-201-0003-4.
- A History of Tamil Cinema. 1991. (Film History – Govt. of Tamil Nadu)
- Starlight, Starbright: The Early Tamil Cinema. Amra Publishers. 1997.
- Murder for Pleasure. 1972. (Fiction)
- Chitale (Biography)
- Monsoon. 1997.(Novelization of a Hollywood film shot in India)
- Gopal, T.S., ed. (1997). Memories of Madras : Its Movies, Musicians & Men of Letters. ISBN 978-8192896175.
