= List of Tamil films of 1941 =

A list of films produced in the Tamil film industry in India in 1941:

== 1941 ==
Title	Director	Production	Music	Cast	Release date (D-M-Y)
Ali Babavum 40 Thirudargalum	K. S. Mani	Ashoka Films	N. S. Balakrishnan	N. S. Krishnan, T. A. Madhuram, M. R. Swaminathan, S. V. Sahasranamam, K. Hiranaiah, N. R. Padmavathi, M. Jayalakshmi, Pulimoottai Ramaswami	15-03-1941
Appoothi Adigal		AL.RM & Company		P. B. Rangachari, P. G. Venkatesan, V. N. Sundaram, Master Sivam, T. N. Meenakshi dance by V. N. Janaki, Krishnabai	
Arjuna					
Aryamala	T. C. Vadivelu Naicker	S. M. Sriramulu Naidu & K. S. Narayana Iyengar, Central Studios	G. Ramanathan	P. U. Chinnappa, M. S. Sarojini, M. R. Santhanalakshmi, T. S. Balaiah, N. S. Krishnan, T. A. Madhuram, S. R. Janaki, Kulathu Mani, A. Sakunthala, P. S. Gnanam, A. R. Sakunthala, B. Rajagopala Iyer	19-10-1941
Ashaadapoothi		AL.RM & Company		P. B. Rangachari, T. N. Vasudevan Pillai, T. V. Sethuraman, K. S. Adhilakshmi, T. S. Jaya Pankajammal	
Ashok Kumar	Raja Chandrasekhar	Murugan Talkies Film Company	Papanasam Sivan	M. K. Thyagaraja Bhagavathar, V. Nagayya, P. Kannamba, M. G. Ramachandran, Ranjan, N. S. Krishnan, T. A. Madhuram, T. V. Kumudhini, Nagercoil Mahadevan	10-07-1941
Bhaktha Gowri	S. Notani	Modern Theatres		U. R. Jeevarathinam, S. D. Subbaiah, K. K. Perumal, C. V. V. Panthulu, Kali N. Rathnam, M. R. Swaminathan, T. S. Durairaj, L. Narayana Rao, P. A. Rajamani, C. T. Rajakantham, P. S. Sivabhaghyam	05-04-1941
Chandrahari		Ashoka Films		N. S. Krishnan, T. A. Madhuram	
Dayalan	A. Mithra Das	T. R. Sundaram, Modern Theatres		P. U. Chinnappa, T. R. Mahalingam	20-12-1941
Dharma Patni	P. Pullaiah	P. Pullaiah & Santha Kumari	Timir Baran & Annasaheb Mainkar	P. Bhanumathi, Santha Kumari, Uppaluri Hanumantha Rao, Hemalatha, K. Lakshmi Narasimha Rao, Achari Adinarayanaiah, Peddapuram Raju, A. Nageswara Rao	
Dharma Veeran	B. Sampathkumar	Kumar Pictures-Sivaji Pictures-Modern Theatres	K. R. Kuppusamy	P. U. Chinnappa, K. K. Perumal, P. A. Kumar, C. S. D. Singh, M. A. Venu, M. A. Rajamani, S. Hemavathi, P. A. Periyanayaki	05-07-1941
Ezhandha Kadhal	K. S. Mani	Ashoka Films		C. S. Jayaraman, N. S. Krishnan, T. A. Madhuram	
Kacha Devayani	K. Subramaniam			T. R. Rajakumari, Kothamangalam Seenu, Kothamangalam Subbu, Vidwan Srinivasan	
Kamadhenu	Nandalal Jeswanlal	Madras United Artist Corporation	Rajeshvararao-Kalayanaraman	S. V. Venkatraman, K. B. Vatsal, G. Pattu Iyer, M. R. S. Mani, Vatsala, Baby Saroja, G. Subbulakshmi, K. N. Kamalam	27-03-1941
Kathambam				N. S. Krishnan, P. G. Vengadesan	
Kothaiyin Kathal	R. Prakash	Sakthi Films		Sundaramoothy Othuvaar, K. R. Sarathambal, T. V. A. Poorani	
Krishnakumar	S. D. S. Yogi	Salem Sathana Films	K. Saambamoorthy	C. Honnappa Bhagavathar, T. S. Rajalakshmi	13-04-1941
Gumasthavin Penn	B. N. Rao & K. V. Srinivasan	Murthy Films	Narayanan-Padmanaban	T. K. Shanmugam, T. K. Baghavathi, M. V. Rajamma, K. R. Ramasamy, M. S. Draupadhi, Friend Ramasami, P. G. Venkatesan, K. N. Kulathu Mani, A. R. Sakunthala	10-05-1941
Madana Kama Rajan	B. N . Rao	S. S. Vasan, Gemini Studios	M. D. Parthasarathi & S. Rajeswara Rao	V. V. Sadagopan, K. L. V. Vasantha, Kothamangalam Subbu, T. S. Durairaj, N. Krishnamurthy, M. R. Santhanam, M. V. Rajamma, K. R. Chellam, M. S. Sundhari Bai and dance by B. S. Saroja	28-11-1941
Manasa Devi		Madras Films		A. K. Pavalar, K. Natarajan, T. R. Krishnamoorthi, A. Sundaram, Kodainayaki, Banumathi	20-04-1941
Mandharavathi	T. Margoni-D. S. Babu	R. V. Pictures	G. J. Cabriel	T. R. Rajakumari	09-08-1941
Mani Malai	Fram Sethna & A.T. Krishnaswamy	AL.RM & Company	S. V. Venkatraman	P. B. Rangachari, K. K. Aathilakshmi, T. S. Jeya	22-11-1941
Minor-in Kaadhal	T. S. Mani	AL.RM & Company		T. S. Durairaj, M. R. Swaminathan, T. V. Sethuraman, N. Venkataraman Babu, K. S. Adhilakshmi, P. R. Mangalam, K. V. Shanthabai	
Naveena Markandeya	A.T. Krishnaswamy	AL.RM & Company – Oriental Films		Kali N. Rathnam, T. R. Ramachandran, K. Hiranaiah, M. R. Subramaniam, Ratnappa, T. S. V. Annapoorani	22-11-1941
Prem Bandhan	Bhagwan	Famous Films	Shanti Kumar Desai	M. K. Radha, T. Suryakumari, R. B. Lakshmi Devi, K. K. Swami	
Rajagopichand		Jothi Films		M. K. Radha	02-08-1941
Raja Yuva					
Ravana Vijayam		Sri Ganga Film Distributor			
Rishyasringar	T. G. Raghavachari	S. Soudararajan, Tamil Nadu Talkies	Sarma Brothers & V. Nagayya	Vasundhara Devi, Ranjan, Veenai S. Balachander, G. Pattu Iyer, Kumari Rukmini, T. E. Krishnamachari, K. N. Ramamurthi Iyer, R. K. Ramasami, M. S. Murugesam, T. V. Sethuraman, V. N. Pankajam, K. N. Kamalam	02-08-1941
Sabapathy	A. V. Meiyappan & A. T. Krishnaswamy	AVM Productions	Saraswathi Musical Troupe	T. R. Ramachandran, R. Padma, Kali N. Rathnam, C. T. Rajakantham, K. Sarangapani, P. R. Mangalam, K. Hiranaiah	14-12-1941
Santha	P. S. Seenivasa Rao	Pakdani Productions		P. S. Seenivasa Rao, Raju, S. G. Chellappa Iyer, M. S. Rajagopal, K. T. Rukmani, K. S. Angamuthu	
Sathi Murali	B. N. Rao, T. C. Vadivelu Naicker	Central Studios		M. K. Radha, M. R. Santhanalakshmi, T. R. Mahalingam, Nagercoil K. Mahadevan, L. Narayana Rao, Kali N. Ratnam, P. G. Venkatesan, "Buffoon" Sankara Iyer, "Joker" Ramudu, S. Varalakshmi, T. A. Madhuram, P. S. Gnanam	
Savithiri	Y. V. Rao	Royal Talkie Distributors	Thuraiyur Rajagopala Sarma & Kamaldas Gupta	M. S. Subbulakshmi, Y. V. Rao, Shanta Apte, V. A. Chellappa, K. Sarangapani, Appa K. Duraiswami, T. S. Durairaj, Golden Saradambal, T. S. Krishnaveni, Sripad Shankar, V. N. Janaki	05-09-1941
Subadra Arjuna	Sama & Ramu	Bhaarath Pictures	S. G. Kasi Iyer	Serukalathur Sama, V. S. Mani, R. Balasubramaniam, G. Subbulakshmi, S. R. Janaki, Gomathi	14-07-1941
Surya Puthri	Ellis R. Dungan	Baskar Pictures	V. S. Parthasarathy Ayyangar	Kothamangalam Seenu, Kothamangalam Subbu, K. S. Gopala Krishnan, Kali N. Rathnam, T. R. Rajakumari, S. R. Janaki, M. S. Sundhari Bai, K. R. Chellam, C. T. Rajakantham	
Thiruvalluvar	Prem Chethna	Prakathi Pictures		Serukalathur Sama, M. Lakshmanan, T. S. Durairaj, T. R. Ramachandran, Kali N. Rathnam, Tirunelveli Pappa, M. Lakshmi, A. Padma, K. N. Kamalam	03-05-1941
Vana Mohini	Bhagwan Dada	N. Viswanatha Iyer	C. Ramchandra	M. K. Radha, K. Thavamani Devi, Baby Rukmini, Chandru (Elephant), S. S. Kokko, Kolathu Mani, Comedian Ambi T. V. Krishnaswami, Kamala Bai, K. T. Sakku Bai, Krishna Bai, S. Basha, S. R. K. Ayyangar, N. Appu	24-12-1941
Vedavathi Alladhu Seetha Jananam	T. R. Raghunath	Shyamala Pictures	T. K. Jeyarama Iyer	M. R. Krishnamoorthi, Kolar Rajam, M. G. Ramachandran, N. S. Krishnan, T. A. Madhuram	11-01-1941/22-2-1941
Venuganam	Murugadasa (Muthuswami Iyer)	P. A. Raju Chettiar, Jewel Pictures	G. Govindarajulu Naidu	N. C. Vasanthakokilam, V. V. Sadagopan, K. Sarangapani, A. Sakunthala, S. M. Subbaiah, Chandra, M. V. Mani, K. N. Kulathumani	12-06-1941
