= Madurai Pushpavanam =

Carnatic Musician

Madurai Pushpavanam Iyer
- Born: Mid-1880s (Madurai, India)
- Died: Early 1920s
- Years active: 1910s–1920s (Carnatic Vocalist)
- Spouse: Sundarathammal (d. 1978)
- Children: Rajam Pushpavanam

Madurai Pushpavanam Iyer was a Carnatic Musician, who was born around 1885 and died around 1920. He was known for his melodious voice and was very popular as a musician. He was the father of Rajam Pushpavanam, the paternal uncle of Madurai Mani Iyer, and grand uncle of T. V. Sankaranarayanan.

R. Rangaramanuja Ayyangar, who published many books on Carantic music, described him as "A handsome stripling with a curious coiffure that subsequently became the fashion among his fans, clad in spotless white muslin with loose sleeves flying about, with eyes closed and the music! What an intoxicating voice, responding readily, with incredible ease and grace, to the surging crescendo of ravishing, sophisticated music conjured up from a highly imaginative mind! And how the audience rocked and swayed as if in a trance"

== Early life and background ==
Pushpavanam was born in the mid-1880s, in Madurai. Not much is known about his early life. But his father had good grounding in carnatic music. When he was very young, his mother would go, clean and pray in a nearby temple, every day. One day, the young Pushpavanam, started singing. It was claimed that Hanuman, who was the deity in the temple, blessed her young son with an impeccable voice.

A renowned teacher of yester years, Ettayapuram Ramachandra Bhagavathar. "prayed for a disciple who would blend his unmatched expertise with a divine voice and Pushpavanam was the answer and gift to him. Pushpavanam was a musical discovery, a treasure-trove. The ‘Flower-garden', which the name of the vocalist actually means, was a veritable garden of raga, tana, pallavi, kriti and swara and he was a master of concerts with few to challenge"

== Career ==
Musicians' remuneration at that time went up only because of Pushpavanam. He stipulated and got what he wanted. Sometimes, the host-organiser would pay double the stipulated sum captivated by his scintillating music. Once all the great musicians had come for a function but he did not come as his stipulation had not been confirmed. Only on receipt of a telegram, he chose to come. And finally, he got a double of that amount, the host surrendering to the magical wizardry of his matchless melody!'

Carnatic Music Association of North America's "Sangeetam", Volume 2000 has this to say: "Pushpavanam Iyer was a very famous vocalist who shot to prominence in the early decades of the century. Maharajapuram Viswanatha Iyer in his heydays was supposed to have reminded his listeners of Pushpavanam and when GN Balasubramaniam came on the scene; his incomparable voice was compared favorably to that of Pushpavanam"

He also sang Hindustani songs. Semmangudi Srinivasa Iyer has gone on record to say "Pushpavanam began singing Hindustani songs at his concerts".

Madurai Mani Iyer had this to say: "What helped me was, my paternal uncle Pushpavanam Iyer had been so famous that people who had listened to his music would readily agree to hold my concert if someone recommended my name" When writing a tribute to T. R. Mahalingam (flautist) "It is the privilege and sagacity of a chosen few to conjure up grand classical visions of supreme sublimity presenting beauteous graces and portraying graceful beauty. They open up magnificent vistas of art, enchant the congnoscenti and the lay. The spell outlasts their periods of glory and fame. Sarabha, the flautist, Maharajapuram Viswanatha Iyer and Pushpavanam, the vocalists, T.N. Rajarathnam Pillai, the nagaswara player and S. G. Kittappa, the dramatist are specimens of this legendary galaxy. To this aristocracy of art belongs T.R. Mahalingam, popularly called Mali."

== Tributes ==
Carnatica.net has this to say: "Pushpavanam was a treasure-trove. The 'flower-garden', which the name of the vocalist actually means, was a veritable garden of ragam, tanam, pallavi, kriti and swara and he was the master of concerts with few to challenge. Unfortunately, he passed away too soon leaving undying name and fame. Noted musician, Madurai Mani Iyer was his nephew. Pushpavanam's music was as attractive as his personality. His voice was his greatest asset."

== Death ==
MS Subbulakshmi in the book "MS: A Life in Music" by T J S George: 'It was predicted by the astrologer that the immortal Pushpavanam (Iyer) would have a long life. Yet he died at a young age." He died aged between 35 and 40, leaving a young widow, Sundarathammal and a daughter named Rajam Pushpavanam who became a singer with All India Radio.

== Family ==
- Wife – Sundarathammal
- Daughter – Rajam Pushpavanam, Carnatic vocalist
- Grand Children – Kalavathi, Nalini, Swaminathan and Pushpavanam
- Nephew – Madurai Mani Iyer, Carnatic vocalist
- Grand Nephew – T V Sankaranarayanan, Carnatic vocalist

On the controversy about Pushpavanam being linked with Shamugavadivu and having another daughter, M S Subbulakshmi, in the book "MS and Radha: a Saga of Steadfast Devotion", released in 2008, Gowri Ramnarayan, the author and Kalki Krishnamurthy's granddaughter, said Subbulakshmi never mentioned her father but that many assumed that it was the brilliant Madurai Pushpavanam Iyer.
