= Influence of Thiruvilaiyadal =

Thiruvilaiyadal (transl. The Divine Game) is a 1965 Indian Tamil-language Hindu mythological film written, directed, produced, and distributed by A. P. Nagarajan. The film stars Sivaji Ganesan, Savitri, and K. B. Sundarambal with T. S. Balaiah, R. Muthuraman, Nagesh, T. R. Mahalingam, S. V. Sahasranamam, Devika, Manorama, and Nagarajan himself playing pivotal roles. The film's soundtrack and score were composed by K. V. Mahadevan, while the lyrics of the songs were written by Kannadasan.

Thiruvilaiyadal was released on 31 July 1965 to critical acclaim, with praise directed at the film's screenplay, dialogue, direction, music, and the performances of Ganesan, Nagesh, and Balaiah. The film became a trendsetter for devotional films as it was released at a time when Tamil cinema primarily produced social melodramas.

== Legacy ==
Only two actors can pull the scene away from under my feet when we face the camera together — one is M. R. Radha, the other, Nagesh.

— Ganesan while listening to an audio version of Thiruvilaiyadal

Thiruvilaiyadal has attained cult status in Tamil cinema. It was also responsible for a resurgence in mythological and devotional cinema as it was released at a time when Tamil cinema primarily produced social films. (Note: In Indian cinema terminology, social films (or simply socials) are films with a contemporary setting, as opposed to those which have mythological and period settings.) Film critic Baradwaj Rangan called it "the best" of the epic Tamil films. Mohan V. Raman called Nagarajan the "Master of mythological cinema". Nagarajan and Ganesan went on to collaborate on several more films in the same genre, including Saraswati Sabatham (1966), Thiruvarutchelvar (1967), Kandan Karunai (1967) and Thirumal Perumai (1968). Other films which followed the trend include: Sri Raghavendrar (1985) and Meenakshi Thiruvilayadal (1989). Savitri and Sundarambal reprised the roles of Parvati and Avvaiyar respectively in Kandan Karunai. Thiruvilaiyadal became a milestone in Nagesh's career and the character of Dharumi is considered to be one of his best roles to date.

Kamal Haasan, Prabhu Deva and Thiagarajan Kumararaja included Thiruvilaiyadal among their favourite films. Director Boopathy Pandian's Thiruvilaiyaadal Aarambam (2006) was initially titled Thiruvilayadal, but this was changed after an outburst of objections from Ganesan's fans. Nakkeeran's dialogue "Netrikkann thirapinum kutram kutramae!" (English: Even if you open your third eye, a flaw is a flaw!) became immensely popular. After the Tamil cinema's platinum jubilee was held in 2007, when S. R. Ashok Kumar of The Hindu asked eight acclaimed directors to list ten films they liked most, Thiruvilaiyadal was chosen by C. V. Sridhar and Ameer. The latter said: "Director A. P. Nagarajan's Thiruvilaiyadal is imaginative. It treats a mythological subject in an interesting way. It is one of the best films in the annals of Tamil cinema." Uma S. Maheshwari of The Hindu included "Paattum Naane" in her list of the "Immortal songs of TMS". (Note: TMS is an acronym for T. M. Soundararajan.) Bharatiya Janata Party member L. Ganesan considered Thiruvilaiyadal and Server Sundaram to be "examples of good Tamil cinema globally."

In April 2012, Thiruvilaiyadal was included in Pavithra Srinivasan of Rediff's list, "The A to Z of Tamil Cinema". She called it: "the best of the many divine tales [Ganesan] acted in." Thiruvilaiyadal is included along with other Sivaji Ganesan films in 8th Ulaga Adhisayam Sivaji, a compilation DVD featuring Ganesan's "iconic performances in the form of scenes, songs and stunts" which was released in May 2012. In May 2014, S. Saraswathi of Rediff included Thiruvilaiyadal in her list of "The Best Mythological Films of Tamil Cinema". In a January 2015 interview with The Times of India, playwright Y. G. Mahendra said, "most character artists today lack variety [...] Show me one actor in India currently who can do a [Veerapandiya] Kattabomman, a VOC, a Vietnam Veedu, a Galatta Kalyanam and a Thiruvilayadal [sic]." In a September 2015 interview with Deccan Chronicle, comedian N. Santhanam stated that when he was in the fourth grade, he performed the role of Dharumi in a drama held at his school Marya Nivas Matriculation School, Chennai.

== In popular culture ==
Thiruvilaiyadal has been parodied and referenced in various media such as films, television and theatre. In Netrikkann (1981), when Chakravarthy (Rajinikanth) refuses to change his character as a womaniser and vehemently denies being one, his son, Santhosh (Rajinikanth), replies "Appa, Netrikkann thirandhaalum kutram kutramae." (English: "Father, even if you open your third eye, a wrong deed is a wrong deed"). Allusions to the song "Paattum Naane" were made in Poove Unakkaga (1996), where Vellayangiri (Meesai Murugesan) sings it in an appalling manner causing people to run away, and in Mahaprabhu (1996), where Dhamu (R. Sarathkumar) disturbs the public by singing it at night. A reference to the song "Ondranavan Uruvil" is seen in Kaathala Kaathala (1998) where Murugan (Kamal Haasan) asks his wife Devayani (Rambha) to sing in praise of him using the numbers "One, Two, Three ..." to which Devayani replies that she is not Avvaiyar and cannot sing using numbers.

In Vanna Thamizh Pattu (2000), when Muthumanikkam (Radha Ravi) announces that Velu (Vadivelu) and Ponnusamy's (Thyagu) daughter would be married, Velu enthusiastically sings "Isai Thamizh" while Muthumanikkam blesses him and Ponnusamy's daughter. In Middle Class Madhavan (2001), Radhika Chaudhari's character imagines herself as Avvaiyar singing "Pazham Neeyappa" when she realises that she will meet with such a fate if she grows old and remains unmarried. Velu (Vadivelu) listens to a tale similar to that of the fruit competition between Vinayaka and Muruga in Kamarasu (2002), with the fruit being a Guava instead of a Mango. This leads to Velu calling the tale "A Thiruvilaiyadal remake". When Vivek's character Aruchamy wishes to join Manickam's (Sathyaraj) lorry company in Vanakkam Thalaiva (2005), Manickam conducts an interview in a question and answer style similar to that of the conversation between Shiva and Dharumi. In Kanthaswamy (2009), a passerby becomes enthusiastic on seeing a Murugan Temple and starts picking up coconuts from Thengaikada Thenappa's (Vadivelu) shop. Thenappa demands money for breaking a coconut. The passerby berates him for mistreating a devotee and frightens him by singing part of "Pazham Neeyappa".

In Oru Kal Oru Kannadi (2012), Meera (Hansika Motwani) sets out a lot of terms and conditions for Saravanan (Udhayanidhi Stalin) to win her love. Saravanan replies she will never find a boy who will accept them and that she will end up like Avvaiyar; he emulates the poet by singing "Pazham Neeyappa". The character of Dharumi was parodied in Iruttula Thedatheenga, a theatrical play performed in November 2013. Baradwaj Rangan, in his review of the Chimbu Deven-directed film, Oru Kanniyum Moonu Kalavaanikalum (2014), compares how the gods summon a touchscreen on which the faces of various humans appear like icons that are used on mobile apps, to the way Shiva plays his divine games by intervening in human affairs in Thiruvilaiyadal.

Thiruvilaiyadal was parodied twice in the STAR Vijay comedy series Lollu Sabha, once in an episode of the same name, and a contemporary version titled "Naveena Thiruvilayaadal". In April 2008, Radhika launched a television series titled Thiruvilaiyadal, which covers all sixty-four stories in the Thiruvilaiyadal Puranam, unlike the film which covered only four.

== Bibliography ==
- Dhananjayan, G. (2014). Pride of Tamil Cinema: 1931 to 2013. Blue Ocean Publishers. ISBN 978-93-84301-05-7.
