= Ananthalakshmi Sadagopan =

Indian Carnatic musician

Ananthalakshmi Sadagopan (28 April 1928 - 15 May 2013) was an Indian Carnatic musician.

== Early life ==
Born in Madurai on 28 April 1928, to parents A. R. Narayanan and Alamelu, Ananthalakshmi had her initial training in Carnatic music under the tutelage of Sattur A. G. Subramaniam. Then she trained under Ganesa Bhagavatar, Semmangudi Srinivasa Iyer, Nedunuri Krishnamurthy and V. V. Sadagopan. She also learnt Hindustani music from Wamanrao Sadolikar. She first gave her Carnatic music concert at Madurai in the presence of Ariyakudi Ramanuja Iyengar when she was 10 years of age.

== Musical journey ==
She has sung many songs for gramophone records. After her marriage, she moved to New Delhi where she started giving concerts in AIR Delhi. Her association with AIR lasted for more than 6 decades. Apart from being a performing artiste, she was a judge for auditions too.

When she lived in Chennai during the 1960s and 70s, she started giving stage concerts in addition to AIR performances.

She has composed music for dance dramas including Meenakshi Ammai Pillai Thamizh, Villi Bharatham and Krishna Leela Tharangini and Kutrala Kuravanji.

== Awards and felicitation ==
- Narada Gana Sabha felicitated her with the Senior Musician award.

== Family life ==
She was married to P. Sadagopan, a former commissioner of income tax department. Her daughter is Sujatha Vijayaraghavan, musician, dance scholar and writer. Her sons are S. Srinivasan and S. Narayan.

== Death ==
Ananthalakshmi Sadagopan died on 15 May 2013.
