= Prem Bandhan =

Prem Bandhan may refer to:

- Prem Bandhan (1941 film), an Indian Tamil-language romantic drama film
- Prem Bandhan (1979 film), an Indian Hindi-language romantic drama film
- Prem Bandhan (TV series), a 2020–2021 Indian dramatic television series
