= Rajam Pushpavanam =

Smt. Rajam Pushpavanam
- Born: Feb 1918 (Madurai, India)
- Died: 6 December 1991 (aged 73)
- Years active: 1930–1943 (Carnatic Vocalist)
- Spouse: S.R.Venkatraman (d. 1950)
- Father: Madurai Pushpavanam

Rajam Pushpavanam (1918–1991), was the daughter of the music vidwan Madurai Pushpavanam Iyer, who was a notable carnatic musician. Rajam Pushpavanam, a cousin of musician Madurai Mani Iyer, was a singer and music director.

== Early life ==
Born in 1918 to Madurai Pushpavanam Iyer and Sundarathammal, she lost her father when she was about two or three years old. Raised by her mother and grandparents she took to music and became known as a singer. She recorded an LP, in 1930, with Columbia Records, when she was only 12 years old. Katcheris followed in succession and she was a successful singer from the late 1920s till the early 1940s.

She constructed a bungalow in the heart of Mylapore, after buying the land for Rs 4550, a princely sum in 1939 and registering it in her mother’s name. She was 21 years old then.

She owned among other things, a fleet of cars. She had a driver's license in 1940 and was the first among woman carnatic musicians to drive on her own. It was also said that there were only four women who drove cars in Madras at that time.

Pushpavanam was the first woman music director of South India. In 1937, she composed music for the film, Rajasekaran in which M. R. Radha acted.

== Personal life ==
At 22, she married S.R.Venkatraman, son of Swaminatha Iyer who had been the Divan (Minister) of the Ramnad kingdom. A son, Srinivasan, was born in 1942. In 1944, while she was away at a concert, he (the young son) succumbed to a sudden attack of pneumonia and died. She was stricken that she was away for her music career when her son died, and she gave up singing in concerts.

Her focus now changed to her family, and she had four more children. Her husband died in 1950 when she was in her early 30s. Later in life, after the death of her husband, she took up to singing for All India Radio and teaching students, and continued to do this for a couple of decades.

== Death ==
She lived with her elder son all her life and in 1991 moved to her second son’s home in Secunderabad. She died on 8 December 1991.

== Legacy ==
An award, "Bala Gnana Kala Bharathi", has been instituted in her memory at Bharat Kalachar, Chennai. The first award was given to Selvi Sooryagayathri in the presence of the Telangana Governor, Dr Tamilisai Soundararajan on 14 December 2019

== Her songs ==
A few of her songs are available on YouTube and one in Carnatica's old and rare recordings collection.
