= Manimekalai (disambiguation) =

Manimekalai is a Tamil epic composed by Sithalai Sattanar.

Manimekalai (alternatively spelt Manimegalai) may refer to:

- Manimekhala, a Hindu-Buddhist goddess
- Manimekalai, the titular character of the epic, first appears as the daughter of Kovalan and Madhavi in a preceding Tamil epic Silappatikaram
- Manimekalai (1940 film), a 1940 Indian film adaptation of the epic
- Manimekalai (1959 film), a 1959 Indian film adaptation of the epic
- Manimegalai, an Indian VJ
- Leena Manimekalai, Indian filmmaker, writer and actor
