= Vidyapathi =

- Directed by: A. T. Krishnasami
- Screenplay by: A. T. Krishnasami
- Based on: Vidyasagar (Novel) by K. Doraiswami Iyengar
- Produced by: G. Mani-C. Sundaram
- Starring: T. R. Ramachandran; T. Premavathi
- Cinematography: P. Ramasami
- Edited by: T. R. Gopu
- Music by: Adeppalli Rama Rao
- Production company: Central Studios
- Release date: 17 October 1946 (India)
- Running time: 2 hrs 43 mins (14750 ft.)
- Country: India
- Language: Tamil

Vidyapathi is a 1946 Indian, Tamil-language film produced by M. Somasundaram and Mohideen under the banner Jupiter Pictures and directed by A. T. Krishnasami. The film stars T. R. Ramachandran, T. Premavathi and K. Thavamani Devi.

== Plot ==
A young man tells his parents that he will marry only after wooing and falling in live with a girl. He sees an ad in a matrimonial column and goes to meet the girl. On his way he is robbed of everything except his loincloth. A fake sadhu finds him and takes him with him. The fake Sadhu makes the young man into a yogi. In the meantime, a zamindar who has an affair with a devadasi (dancer), neglects his wife and daughter. The Sadhu introduces the yogi (the young man) to the young woman with an idea for making money. But the young man and woman fall in love with each other. After many twists and turns, they both marry.

== Cast ==
Cast According to the film's song book

Male Cast

- T. R. Ramachandran as Vidyapathi
- D. Bala Subramaniam as Zamindar
- M. R. Swaminathan as Muruganadavi
- M. N. Nambiar as Narayana Bhagavathar
- T. N. Sivathanu as Kalyanam
- K. Srinivasan as Venu (Rowdy)
- B. Rajagopala Iyer as Ramayana Bhagavathar
- Nat Annaji Rao as Sub Magistrate
- N. S. Narayana Pillai as Sub Inspector
- T. M. Gopal as Munirathnam (Rowdy)
- N. Shankaramoorthy as Veeranna Reddy

Male Support Cast

P. G. Madhavan, M. M. A. Chinnappa, C. P. Kittan,
P. M. Saminathan, R. Ramasami Iyer, A. C. Irusappa,
S. T. Lakshmanan, S. Meenakshi Subramaniam,
K. Jaganathan, M. Satya Narayanan, K. Rajarathnam,
T. A. Natarajan, A. Ganesh Singh, T. R. Rajagopal,
and D. K. Chinnappa.

Female Cast

- T. Premavathi as Aparanji
- K. Thavamani Devi as Dasi Mohanambal
- M. S. Bhagyam as Narayana Bhagavathar's Wife
- M. M. Radha Bai as Magathambal
- D. S. Krishnaveni as Female Zamindar
- T. G. Kamala Devi as Kamala
- C. K. Saraswathi as Veerayi
- R. Malathi as Malayala Bhagavathi
- D. Kamala Bai as Nurse

Female Support Cast

C. K. Nirmala, M. K. Subhadra, R. Bharathi, K. Lakshmi,
N. R. Meera, M. K. Nagalakshmi, T. R. Chandra, P. P. Mary,
S. S. Lalithambal, K. Thangamani, S. Govinthammal,
T. P. Lakshmi, and K. Rathnam.

== Production ==
K. Thavamani Devi performed a Western-type dance choreographed by Mrs. Rainbird and the background music was provided by C. G. Rob and his party. The Tamil song had English words intermingled which was a novelty at that time. "Here goes the song.... ‘Atho rendu (there the two)....Black eyes! Ennai paarthu (Looking at me)...Once, twice! Kannai chimitti (winking!)... Dolly! Kai kotti (with hands)...Calls me! I will dance for you!'". The English words in the song were penned by K. Thavamani Devi herself. She also designed her own costume.

== Soundtrack ==
Music was composed by Adeppalli Rama Rao while the lyrics were penned by Udumalai Narayana Kavi. Singers are T. G. Kamala Devi, K. Thavamani Devi, T. R. Ramachandran, and M. N. Nambiar. The only playback singer is K. V. Janaki.

No	Song	Singer	Length (m:ss)
1	"Aadu Radde Suzhanrudu Radde"	T. G. Kamala Devi	
2	"Raman Varuvaarodi"	K. V Janaki	02:52
3	"Atho Rendu" ... Black eyes "Ennai Parthu" ... Once twice "Kannai Chimitti" ... Dolly "Kaiyai Kotti" ... Calls me!	K. Thavamani Devi	
4	"Enpalli Kondeerayya"	K. V. Janaki	04:11
5	"Aantavane Enaiyal"	T. R. Ramachandran	
6	"Booloka Janaki Mane ... Shri Ramasami Ramana"	T. R. Ramachandran, K. V. Janaki	
7	"Thayapara Jeevanilla Thegam Yano"	K. V. Janaki	02:59
8	"Arivenaiya Un Antharangam"	Dance	
9	"Ragupathi Ragava Raja Ram"	M. N. Nambiar	

== Reception ==
The film did not fare well at the box-office. Film historian Randor Guy wrote in 2010 that the film is "Remembered for the interesting storyline, witty dialogue, fine song and dance numbers and Thavamani's exciting screen presence."
