= Toofan Queen =

- Release date: 1946
- Country: India
- Language: Hindi

Toofan Queen is a Bollywood film starring R. B. Lakshmi Devi. It was released in 1946.
