= V. V. Sadagopan =

Tamil actor and musician

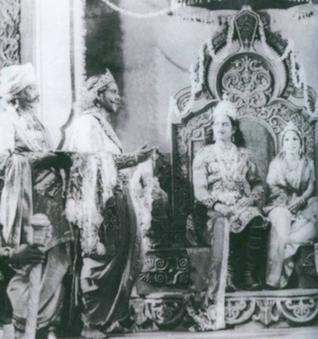
- V. V. Sadagopan (Seated) in the film Madanakamarajan (1941)
- Born: Veeravanallur Vedantam Sadagopan; 29 January 1915; Veeravanallur, Tirunelveli district, Tamil Nadu
- Disappeared: 11 April 1980 (aged 65); Andhra Pradesh, India
- Status: Missing for 46 years, 5 months and 15 days; possibly deceased
- Education: University
- Occupations: Film Actor, Carnatic Musician, Musicologist, Writer, Composer
- Title: Professor
- Spouse: Ranganayaki Sadagopan (1923–2019)
- Children: Radhika Sridharan, Devika Raman, Vijaya Srinivasan, V.S.Krishnakumar, Lakshmi
- Parent: Vedantam Iyengar
- Relatives: V. V. Sundararajan, V. V. Narayanan, V. V. Varadarajan (Brothers), Jayalakshmi Santhanam (Sister)

Veeravanallur Vedantam Sadagopan (born 29 January 1915 – disappeared 11 April 1980) was an Indian educator, musician and actor who served as a professor of music at Delhi University. Sadagopan was known for his efforts to promote children's music education and devotion to the Vaishnavite religious tradition, which led him to extensively research the Naalayira Divya Prabandham, a Tamil verse compilation.

Sadagopan was born in Veeravanallur, a small town in the Tirunelveli district of Tamil Nadu. He came to Chennai in the 1930s, initially to prepare for the Indian Civil Service examinations, and began writing about music for the Tamil weekly Ananda Vikatan. He also pursued a brief career as an actor, during which he starred in five films, but he later shifted his efforts to performing music. Sadagopan trained under the Carnatic singer Ariyakudi Ramanuja Iyengar and began to hold concerts across India. The Indian government named him a music director at the Gandhigram Rural Institute, where prime minister Jawaharlal Nehru visited in 1959. Nehru was impressed by Sadagopan's performance, and appointed him to a music professorship at Delhi University, where he served until 1975.

In April 1980, Sadagopan disappeared for unknown reasons after leaving the Gudur Junction railway station in Andhra Pradesh, while en route to Chennai from Delhi. His whereabouts and ultimate fate remain unknown.

== Personal life ==
Sadagopan was born on 29 January 1915 in Veeravanallur, a small town in Tirunelveli district. He was the son of an insurance agent, Vedantam Iyengar, and first studied English, Maths, and Sanskrit. He came to Chennai in 1934 to prepare for the Indian Civil Service examinations. His wife Ranganayaki Sadagopan used to accompany him on tanpura on occasion. The couple had 4 children. Several members of his extended family pursued music. His sister Jayalakshmi Santhanam (1933–2018) was a musician and children's music teacher. His sister-in-law Ananthalakshmi Sadagopan (1928–2013) and her child Sujatha Vijayaraghavan were also both musicians.

== Writer ==
In Chennai, Sadagopan became associated with Tamil writer V. Ramasamy, better known by his pen-name VaRaa, and entered journalism. He wrote for the popular weekly Tamil publication Ananda Vikatan in both the English and Tamil language. In addition to his articles on music, he wrote poetry, lyrics and even a number of stories in Tamil for Ananda Vikatan.

== Film actor ==
Sadagopan acted as the main actor in the Tamil film Nava Yuvan (Modern Youth), also known as Geethasaram (Essence of Gita). (It was customary for Tamil films at that time to have two names as titles). The film was shot in London. It is the first ever Tamil film to be shot in a foreign country and V. V. Sadagopan became the first to have acted in such a film. Sadagopan was also the first university graduate to have acted in a Tamil film. The coronation ceremony of King George VI was also shown along with this film.

His second film Adhirstam (Luck) was released in 1939. In 1941, he played the hero in the Gemini Studios production Madanakamarajan, alongside the female lead K. L. V. Vasantha. Sadagopan also acted alongside N. C. Vasanthakokilam in Venuganam in 1941. In his final film, Jeevan Mukthi, a Telugu film produced by S. S. Vasan, he played Lord Vishnu. Afterwards, he decided not to continue his film career and instead pursued music.

== Music performer ==
Sadagopan had his musical training under Namakkal Sesha Iyengar and the Carnatic vocalist Ariyakudi Ramanuja Iyengar. He was both a musician and a musicologist. He studied Vaishnavite literature deeply and gave concerts comprising verses from the Kamba Ramayanam. He travelled all over India and abroad for these lecture-cum-music concerts. He was a member of the audition panel of All India Radio (AIR) and also of the experts committee of the Madras Music Academy, and represented Indian Music in the Centenary celebrations of the Moscow Conservatoire 1966.

== Music teacher ==
Teaching music to children was a subject important to Sadagopan, and he launched the Tyaga Bharathi movement to carry out this mission. The term Tyaga Bharathi was coined by him to epitomise the ideals of Saint Tyagaraja and Subramania Bharati.

When Soundaram Ramachandaran, a Minister in Jawaharlal Nehru's Cabinet, launched the Gandhigram Rural Institute (GRI), she appointed Sadagopan as the Director of Music Studies.

When Nehru visited the institution in 1959, he saw the Kuravanji dance-drama of Sadagopan. Nehru was impressed by Sadagopan's performance and appointed him Professor of Music at Delhi University. He served two terms as professor at Delhi University and left in 1975. He was also a member of the board of studies in several universities.

== Religious contributions ==
Sadagopan, a Vaishnavite, was deeply involved in religion. He conducted extensive research on the Naalayira Divya Prabhandham, a compilation of verses, and he mentored students who continued his research. A trust called Sri Sadagopan Thirunarayanaswami Divya Prabhanda Patasala was started in the singer's name. With Srirama Bharathi, one of his disciples, he released Spirals and Circles, a book that explains the concept of Carnatic music and the mindset associated with it.

Srirama Bharathi and his wife Sowbhagyalakshmi propagated Thyaga Bharathi songs through the trust and went on to compose tunes for the Nalayira Divya Prabhandam. After the death of her husband, Sowbhagyalakshmi continued the practice along with family and close associates. Targeting children, whom she felt would be the perfect audience, she began conducting summer camps in schools and composed songs for mentally-challenged children in special schools.

== Unique compositions ==
Sadagopan composed music in several languages.

His compositions include kritis, keerthanas, ragamaligais, padams, kili kanni and a series of Tirukkuṛaḷ keerthanais, wherein the Kural forms the Pallavi and is elaborated in the Anupallavi and Charanam.

He set the lyrics of Ambujam Krishna's "Gana Mazhai Pozhigindraan" to music.

He was the first to render a whole music concert of Kamba Ramayanam verses at the Karaikudi Kamban vizha. The music was set by him.

He also set several Pasurams of Divya Prabandham to music.

He composed several songs using the mudra (signature) Seshadasan.

== Disappearance ==
Sadagopan disappeared for unknown reasons in 1980. T.K. Venkatasubramanaian, a retired professor of history at Delhi University, stated: "He got off the train at Gudur in Andhra Pradesh on 11 April 1980, on his way from Delhi to Chennai. Afterwards there was no information about his whereabouts. His family still believes that he lives somewhere".

Rumours of sighting him in Varanasi and in the Himalayas and consequent searches have yielded no results.

== Centenary remembrance ==
A birth centenary remembrance program was organised on 8 February 2015 by Chandlian Memorial Trust and Lakshmi Kuppusamy Trust at the Bharatiya Vidya Bhavan centre in Mylapore, a neighborhood of Chennai.

== See also ==
- List of people who disappeared mysteriously (1980s)
