= Arivaali =

- Theatrical release poster
- Directed by: A. T. Krishnaswamy
- Written by: A. T. Krishnaswamy
- Based on: Penn Paduthum Paadu by A. T. Krishnaswamy
- Produced by: A. T. Krishnaswamy
- Starring: Sivaji Ganesan; P. Bhanumathi
- Cinematography: K. Balu
- Edited by: V. S. Rajan; Vasu
- Music by: S. V. Venkatraman
- Production company: A. T. K. Productions
- Release date: 1 March 1963
- Running time: 141 minutes
- Country: India
- Language: Tamil

Arivaali (transl. Genius) is a 1963 Indian Tamil language film written, produced and directed by A. T. Krishnaswamy. It is based on his play Penn Paduthum Paadu, in turn based on the William Shakespeare play The Taming of the Shrew. The film stars Sivaji Ganesan and P. Bhanumathi. It was released on 1 March 1963.

== Plot ==
Aalavanthan is a graduate who works hard for the poor farmers in his village and opposes the Zamindar Azhagu Singam's rule. Aalavanthan is aided by his close friend Muthuvel, a social activist-journalist. In turn, Muthu's father Nallamuthu Naicker is a land agent who supports the Zamindar. Muthuvel loves an uneducated village belle Thangalakshmi, marries her, and moves out as he does not like his father's bad deeds. There will be many occasions where her illiteracy is the highlight comedy of this movie.

Thandapani Pillai is a wealthy man who wishes to get his arrogant and spoiled daughter Manorama married and is willing to give away Rs. 1 lakhs and 60 acres of land to the groom who is willing to wed her. Aalavanthan learns regarding this from his friend Tom Kumar and wishes to marry her as the dowry could be able to help the poor farmers. Tom Kumar is in love with Manorama's younger sister India. Manorama has the habit of doing the opposite action of what Aalavanthan wishes or says. Aalavanthan uses this as an advantage to marry Manorama. Tom Kumar and India are married at the same time.

Aalavanthan starts his plan to tame Manorama by creating all kinds of discomforts to her. In turn, Manorama realises her mistakes, repents and becomes a good wife till to extent of becoming Aalavanthan's advisor. Aalavanthan meets with the Zamindar to discuss about the land issue, where Aalavanthan meets Mohini, who is his college mate and also Zamindar's fiancée. Upon Mohini's persuasion the Zamindar agrees, he and Aalavanthan become friends and arrange to start up a cooperative farm in their village. Upon learning this, Nallamuthu Naicker hatches a plan by making up story about Aalavanthan and Mohini's affair with the help of Thandapani Pillai's servant, Kandhasami. Manorama does not believe this, but the Zamindar does and injures Aalavanthan. The village people learn of this incident and assemble to attack the Zamindar. Muthuvel and Manorama learn the truth from Kandhasami about Nallamuthu Naicker's wicked plan and force Nallamuthu Naicker to confess and admit to the village people of his wrongdoings. The Zamindar apologises to Aalvanthan and donates his 1000 acres of the land to the villagers' aid.

All goes well and Alavanthan succeeds in starting a cooperative farm in their village. Aalavanthan and Manorama become a loving husband and wife.

== Cast ==
- Sivaji Ganesan as Aalavanthan
- P. Bhanumathi as Manorama
- T. S. Balaiah as Nallamuthu Nayakar
- K. A. Thangavelu as Muthuvel
- K. Sarangapani as Sandamarutham Dhandapani Pillai
- T. R. Ramachandran as Eklove
- S. V. Ramadas as Zamindar Azhagu Singam
- M. Saroja as India
- T. P. Muthulakshmi as Thangalakshmi
- Gemini Chandra as Mohini
- Ennatha Kannaiya as Kanthasamy

Dance

- Sayee–Subbulakshmi

== Production ==
Arivaali is based on the play Penn Paduthum Paadu which itself based on the William Shakespeare play The Taming of the Shrew. A. T Krishnasamy who wrote and directed the play also directed the film adaptation. It was planned by Krishnaswamy in 1953 with M. G. Ramachandran as lead actor. Despite some progress, Ramachandran later backed out and Sivaji Ganesan was cast instead. However, production was delayed for almost a decade.

== Soundtrack ==
The soundtrack was composed by S. V. Venkatraman. The lyrics were written by Papanasam Sivan and A. Maruthakasi.

Track listing
No.	Title	Lyrics	Singer(s)	Length
1.	"Arivukku Virunthaagum"	A. Maruthakasi	T. M. Soundararajan	3:55
2.	"En Kobam Pollathadhu"	A. Maruthakasi	P. Bhanumathi, T. M. Soundararajan	3:27
3.	"Koovatha Inbakkuyil"	A. Maruthakasi	P. Bhanumathi	2:57
4.	"Oomey Sequence"	A. Maruthakasi	K. A. Thangavelu	6:39
5.	"Pattuppol Meni"	A. Maruthakasi	P. Bhanumathi, T. M. Soundararajan	4:27
6.	"Vaazhiya Needoozhi"	A. Maruthakasi	Radha Jayalakshmi, P. Leela	5:35
7.	"Venkata Ramana"	Papanasam Sivan	P. Bhanumathi	2:24
Total length:				29:24

== Reception ==
Kanthan of Kalki criticised virtually every aspect of the film. He felt Sarangapani was underutilised, and Gemini Chandra's dialogues were hard to understand. Kumudham wrote Bhanumathi's outspoken demonstration and Ganesan's contained self-confidence are a good match for Banumathi's excitement born of hatred and Shivaji's intrigue born of love. A single 'Arivali' can compensate for the damage done to art by three action films.
