= Sankaradas Swamigal =

- Born: Sankaran; 7 September 1867; Kattunaickenpatti, Tinnively District, Madras Presidency, British India (now in Thoothukudi District, Tamil Nadu, India)
- Died: 13 November 1922 (aged 55); Pondichéry, French India (now Puducherry, India)
- Occupations: actor, playwright, song writer, drama company owner
- Years active: 1891 - 1921

Sankaradas Swamigal (7 September 1867 – 13 November 1922) was a Tamil writer, actor, playwright, songwriter and drama producer whose boys company is known for launching the careers of Tamil artists such as S. G. Kittappa, K. B. Sundarambal, M. R. Radha, S. V. Venkataraman and K. Sarangapani. Swamigal is considered one of the pioneers of Tamil theatre along with Pammal Sambandha Mudaliar.

== Early life ==
Swamigal was born in Tuticorin in 1867 to Damodaran Pillai and Kanthimathi Ammal. He studied Tamil under the tutelage of his father, and later Palani Dandapani Swamigal, before joining a salt factory as an accountant.

== Career ==
Swamigal was more interested in composing Tamil venbas and songs and in 1891, he quit his job at the age of 24. With the support of two drama producers, Ramudu Iyer and Kalyanarama Iyer, Swamigal began acting in plays. After a short while, Swamigal joined the drama company of Samy Naidu.

At the insistence and encouragement of Manpoondia Pillai, Swamigal began writing plays. His first success was Pammal Sambandha Mudaliar's Manoharan for which he wrote the songs.
