= Kandhan Karunai =

Kanthan Karunai
- Theatrical release poster
- Directed by: A. P. Nagarajan
- Screenplay by: A. P. Nagarajan
- Based on: Kanthapuranam by Kachiyappar
- Produced by: A. L. Srinivasan
- Starring: See cast
- Cinematography: K. S. Prasanth
- Edited by: R. Devarajan
- Music by: K. V. Mahadevan Kunnakudi Vaidyanathan (1 song)
- Production company: A. L. S. Productions
- Release date: 14 January 1967
- Running time: 150 minutes
- Country: India
- Language: Tamil

Kanthan Karunai (transl. By the mercy of Kanthan) is a 1967 Indian Tamil-language Hindu mythological film, written and directed by A. P. Nagarajan. It features an ensemble cast including Sivaji Ganesan, Gemini Ganesan, K. B. Sundarambal, Savitri, Jayalalithaa, K. R. Vijaya and Sivakumar. This was the debut film for Sridevi, who starred as Hindu god Murugan at the age of 3.

== Plot ==
The film revolves around Murugan, his birth, marriage, and acceptance of the post of head of the army of heaven. In Hinduism, there are six abodes of Muruga, known as the "Arupadaiveedu". The story behind each of the abodes is portrayed chronologically in the film. It starts with Swamimalai, where Muruga teaches the meaning of the word 'OM' to his father, Shiva. He goes to Palani Hills, his second abode, after a fight over a sacred fruit. Then he wins over the demon king Surapadman in Thiruchendur and that is his third abode. The King of Heaven, Indra offers his daughter's hand in appreciation of Muruga's victory, and he marries her in Thirupparamkunram, his fourth abode. He later marries Valli in his fifth abode of Thiruthani, and after a short dispute between both his wives, they amicably settle in Pazhamudircholai, his sixth abode. All the events are summarized by Nakkeerar, a Tamil poet portrayed by Sirkazhi Govindarajan at the end of the film.

== Cast ==
- Sivakumar as Lord Murugan
  - Master Sridhar as Adolescent Murugan
  - Sridevi as Child Murugan
- Sivaji Ganesan as Veerabahu Devar, Murugan's Soldging commander
- Gemini Ganesan as Shiva Parvathi's husband, Vinayagan and Murugan's father
- Savithiri as Parvathi, Shiva's wife, Vinayagan and Murugan's mother
- K. R. Vijaya as Deivanai, Murugan's first wife.
- Jayalalithaa as Valli, Murugan's second wife.
- V. Gopalakrishnan as Jayanthan, Indra's son who was kidnapped by Soorapadman
- S. Varalakshmi as Shachi, Indra's wife, Jayantha's mother
- S. A. Ashokan as Soorapadman, the demon king, Banukopan's father
- K. Balaji as Banugopan, Soorapadman's son
- S. V. Ramadas as Soorapadman's assistant
- E. R. Sahadevan as Singamugasuran, a demon, Soorapadman's brother
- G. Sakunthala as Ajamukhi
- Ambika as Paduma Komalai
- Manimala as Banugopan's wife
- K. B. Sundarambal as Avvaiyar
- Sirkazhi Govindarajan as Nakkeerar (cameo)
- Nagesh as Nageswaran
- Manorama as Valli's friend
- B. V. Radha as Ajamukhi's assistant

== Production ==
Vijayakumar was supposed to play Lord Murugan in the film, but he was replaced by Sivakumar. Vijayakumar instead appeared as one of the lords who was in the jail. Kannadasan recommended Sridevi for her role. This was the debut film for actress Sridevi. A large set depicting the battle on Thiruchendur was erected at Sarada Studios.

== Soundtrack ==
The music was composed by K. V. Mahadevan, for which he received the National Film Award for Best Music Direction. The song "Thiruparankundrathil Nee" was composed by Kunnakudi Vaidyanathan. The song "Arupadai Veedu" is a ragamalika; it starts off with Kambodhi followed by Hindolam, Chakravakam, Kaanada, Hamsanandhi, Natakurinji and Kapi. "Solla Solla inikkudhadaa" song is set to Kundhalavarali raaga."Thiruparankundrathil Nee" song set in Suddha Dhanyasi ragam and "Arumugamana Porul" song set in Mohanam."Vellimalai Mannava" song set in Charukesi.

Song	Singers	Lyrics	Length
"Aarumugamana Porul"	Renuka, S. Janaki. Soolamangalam Rajalakshmi	Kannadasan	03:24
"Aarumuga Saravana"	P. Susheela	Sankaradas Swamigal	00:54
"Arupadai Veedu Konda"	Sirkazhi Govindarajan	Kannadasan	06:41
"Ariyathu Ketkum"	K. B. Sundarambal	Kannadasan	06:06
"Konjum Kili"	S. V. Ponnusamy	Sankaradas Swamigal	01:11
"Kurinjiyile Poo Malarnthu"	P. Susheela	Kannadasan	03:44
"Manam Padaithen"	P. Susheela	Kannadasan	04:01
"Murugane Senthil"	Sirkazhi Govindarajan	Kannadasan	00.58
"Munthum Thamizh"	S. C. Krishnan, A. L. Raghavan, K. Jamuna Rani, A. P. Komala	Kannadasan	01:51
"Muruga Muruga Muruga"	K. B. Sundarambal	Kannadasan	01:43
"Solla Solla" (Film Version)	P. Susheela	Kannadasan	02:22
"Solla Solla" (Full Version)	P. Susheela	Kannadasan	03:21
"Thirupparang Kundrathil"	Soolamangalam Rajalakshmi, P. Susheela	Poovai Senguttavan	03:23
"Vallimalai Pothigaimalai"	P. Susheela	Kannadasan	
"Vellimalai Mannava"	S. Varalakshmi	Kannadasan	01:54
"Vetrivel Veeravel"	T. M. Soundararajan	Kannadasan	02:41

== Reception ==
Kalki appreciated Nagarajan for taking an old story and reinventing it.
