= Suguna Vilasa Sabha =

Suguna Vilasa Sabha is a club founded by Pammal Sambandha Mudaliar, based in the city of Chennai, India. The Suguna Vilasa Sabha club is also called as SVS club. The Suguna Vilasa Sabha club was founded by a band of public spirited men headed by Late Sambanda Mudaliar for promotion of histrionic talent in the year 1891.It is one of the oldest and foremost theatre companies in the city.

== History ==
The Suguna Vilasa Sabha was established in Madras as a theatre company in the year 1891 in a house in Georgetown. In 1902, the Sabha moved to the Victoria Public Hall from where it functioned from 1902 to 1936, when it moved to Mount Road. In 1945, the Sabha built its own theatre, the New Theatre. As stage dramas began to decline after the Second World War, the Sabha transformed into a social club.

In the beginning the sabha was housed in Vijayanagaram Maharajas’s High School in George Town, free of rent. In 1896 it rented a premise in Thambu Chetty Street. Chennai Kodaivallal Rajah Sir Savalai Ramasami Mudaliar., kt., CIE was the first President of Suguna Vilasa Sabha and he was instrumental in the growth of the Sabha.In 1902 the Sabha moved to Victoria Public Hall. It was there the Sabha expanded its activities and provided additional recreational amenities like Tennis, Billiards, Table Tennis and other games besides staging many Dramas. The need for acquiring a Building of its own was felt and the present site was purchased.

Under the past president, M. A. M. Ramaswamy, the Sabha has been expanding steadily as one of the oldest and premier clubs in the city.

== Artists ==
The Tamil playwright, Pammal Sambandha Mudaliar was associated with the Suguna Vilasa Sabha in the early 1900s. Popular dancer E. Krishna Iyer was also associated with the Sabha.

== Facilities ==
Catering facilities, open air theater, party facility, the i bar, indoor and outdoor games, swimming pool, health club and gym, cards room, library, guest house and billiards.

=== Infrastructure ===
- Attractively designed, Air-conditioned and well furnished including 10 deluxe rooms.
- A state-of-the-art - Sports Complex, the best Gym-equipped with ultra modern facilities and Health Club.
- Air-conditioned Bar, Non-smoking Lounge, Conference Halls, Cards Room and Library.
- Vegetarian, Non-Vegetarian, Chinese Tandoori & Continental food.
- A well carpeted Air-Conditioned snooker and Billiards room with two tables
- Lawn Service.

=== Location ===
SVS ClubNo. 57, Anna Salai, Chennai - 600 002.
