= Sattur A. G. Subramaniam =

Indian carnatic singer (1916–1977)

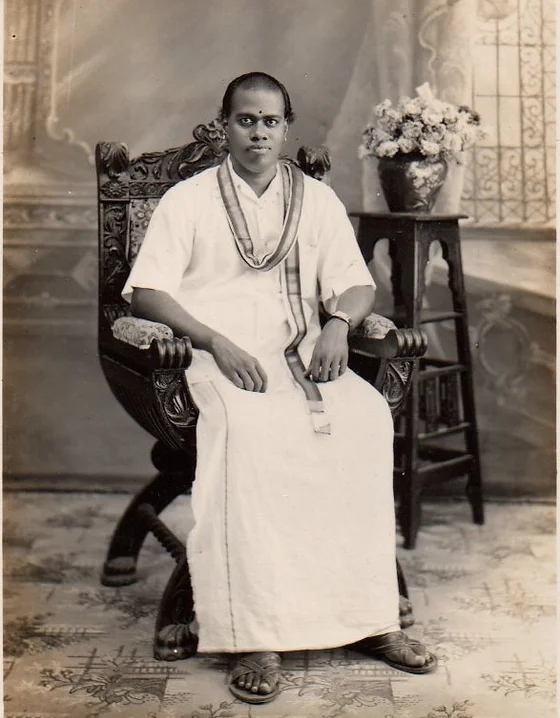
Sathur A.G. Subramaniam

Sathur A. G. Subramaniam, (1916–1977) was a vocalist in the Carnatic tradition. A contemporary of Ariyakudi Sri Ramanuja Iyengar, Sri G. N. Balasubramaniam, and Madurai Mani Iyer, he was known for his pure, unadulterated style and strict adherence to tradition. His vocals were enriched with brugas and high speeds.

== Early life ==
Sathur A. G. Subramaniam was born to Ganesh Sastrigal and Thailammal in Angarai, Tiruchirapalli. He lived his formative years with his uncle in nearby Sathur, in Virudhunagar district and was exposed to the devotional singing of “bhajana goshtis”. He joined Annamalai University, Chidambaram to pursue his passion for music, where he was trained by distinguished maestros like Tiruvaiyyaru Sabesa Iyer, Thanjavur Ponnaiah Pillai, Tiger Varadachariar etc. He graduated with a degree in music, “Sangeetha Bhushanam” in 1936.

== Education ==
He received his Sangita Bhushanam diploma from Annamalai University in 1936, where he was taught by other distinguished stalwarts like Tiruvaiyaru Sabhesa Aiyer and Thanjavur Ponnaiah Pillai.

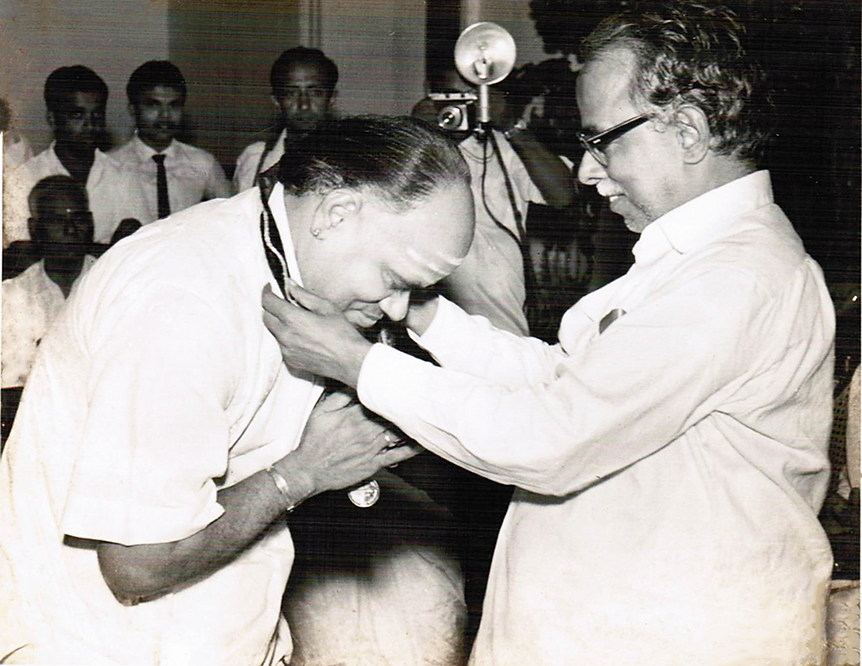
Receiving "Sangeetha Kala Sigamani" from the Chief Minister of Tamil Nadu, C.N. Annadurai.

== Style of singing ==
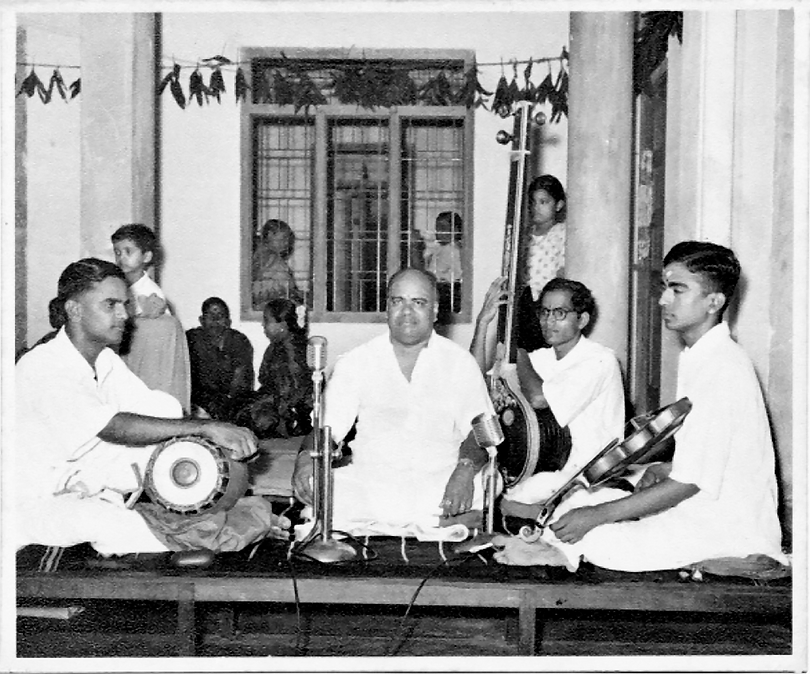
With Umayalpuram K. Sivaraman and Lalgudi G. Jayaraman.

With the blessings of Ariyakudi Ramanuja Iyengar, he performed his first concert at the Sathguru Thyagaraja festival in Tiruvaiyyaru in 1937. Thereafter, there was no looking back for the young artiste. Sri Subramaniam had a majestic voice (“Vengala Kural” in Tamil), called as “Ravai Saareeram”, and could produce intricate gamakas and brugas with clarity. Being fluent in several languages, his renditions had a clear diction bringing out the meaning and emotion “Bhava” in the song. His “Bani” or “Pattandhiram” was regarded as pure, authentic and strictly adhering to tradition.

"A purist to the last, his raga alapanas and pallavi elaboration in different ragas were masterpieces of expertise, lakshana - lakshya elegance, high level artistic exuberance of manodharma"

His singing endeared him to several of his famous contemporaries like GNB, Madurai Mani Iyer and Ariyakudi Ramanuja Iyengar.

Inaugurating the Sri Rama Navami concerts at Coimbatore was a privilege that was accorded to only the best singers. AGS was given this privilege for several years, consistently.

== Disciples ==
AGS was a much loved guru, who was affectionate towards all his disciples. His famous disciples were Sirkazhi V. R. Subramaniam, Sirkazhi R. Jayaraman, Musiri Rangarajan, Sitamani Srinivasan, Sulochana Pattabhiraman, Tiruchi N. Natarajan among several others including his daughters, Smt Lakshmi Sundaram, Smt Lalitha Santhanam and Smt Bhuvana Rajagopalan, and grandchildren Smt. Shanthi Shriram (USA), Uma Kumar (Switzerland), and Krishna Ramarathinam (Australia), who continue to perform, teach and uphold his legacy.

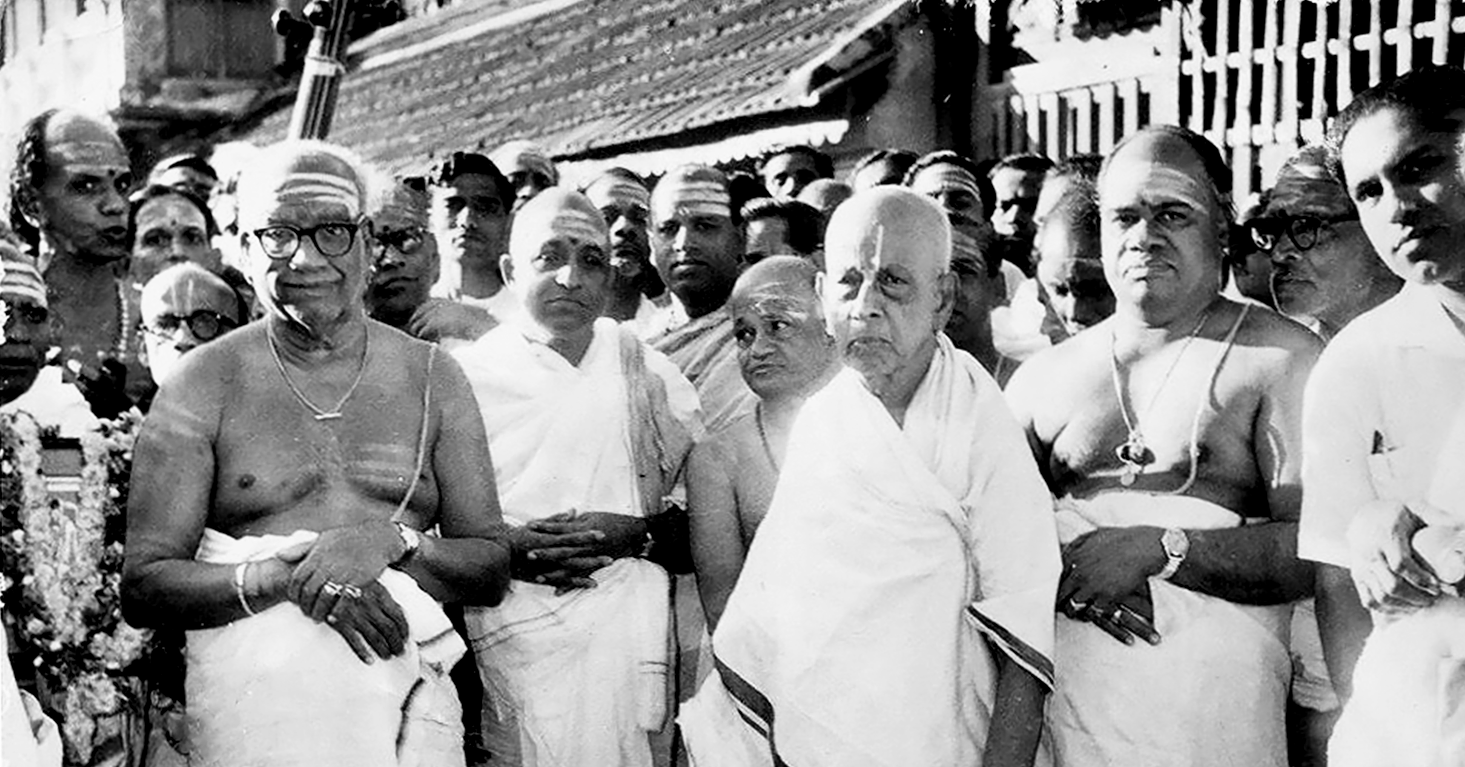
With Maharajapuram Viswanatha Iyer, Semmangudi Srinvasa Iyer, and Ariyakudi Ramanuja Iyengar.

== Music ==
Only two gramophone records and three cassettes of his rendition survive today.
