= Chandrahari =

- Directed by: K. S. Mani
- Based on: Chandrahari - Stage play by Pammal Sambandam Mudaliar
- Produced by: N. S. Krishnan
- Starring: N. S. Krishnan; T. A. Mathuram; L. Narayana Rao; Kaka Radhakrishnan
- Cinematography: E. R. Cooper
- Edited by: Surya
- Production company: Asoka Films
- Release date: 1941
- Country: India
- Language: Tamil

Chandrahari is a 1941 Indian, Tamil language film directed by K. S. Mani. The film stars N. S. Krishnan, T. A. Mathuram.

== Plot ==
It is a spoof of a legendary story of King Harishchandra who never told a lie. The main character of this story, King Chandrahari, will never tell a truth. Sage Vistavasi challenges Yama that he will make Chandrahari to tell a truth. He leaves the heavenly abode and comes to Earth with 9000 gold coins. He asks Chandrahari to give him 1000 gold coins to make it 10,000. The king says he does not have even a penny. The sage gives the 9000 coins to the king as a loan and goes away. During a nightly rounds, the king meets two women in a hut and misbehaves with them. The sage learns of this incident and demands the king to marry the women. The king abdicates his kingdom and walks away with his wife and son. The sage takes over the kingdom. Many complications follow and finally the king wins. The sage restores everything to normalcy.

== Cast ==
List adapted from the song book

- N. S. Krishnan as Chandrahari
- T. A. Mathuram as Mathichandrai
- Radhakrishnan as Dhasadevan
- C. P. Kittan as Sathyakirthi
- L. Narayana Rao as Esha Nakshatran
- P. G. Kuppusami as Sishtavasi
- M. Thiruvenkatam as Mithravasu

- Narasimhachari as Kandakalan
- Kamalam as Kandakali
- Shankara Moorthi as Sivan
- Velu Pillai as Yaman
- Lakshmi Narayanan as Bhaguveer
- Babuji as Girl Dancer
- Lalitha as Girl Dancer

== Production ==
This was a stage play of the same name by Pammal Sambandha Mudaliar, one of the two founding fathers of Tamil theatre (the other being Sankaradas Swamigal). N. S. Krishnan adapted it and produced as a film under his own banner Asoka Films. The film was directed by K. S. Mani. Cinematography was handled by E. R. Cooper while the editing was done by Surya. The film was shot at Central Studios, Coimbatore.

As this was a short film, it was package as part 2 with another film Ezhandha Kadhal (Part 1).

== Reception ==
Film historian Randor Guy wrote in 2014 that the film is "Remembered for the humorous dialogue with satire and the performances of NSK and Mathuram as the lead pair.
