= A. T. Krishnaswamy =

Indian film director

- ஏ. டி. கிருஷ்ணசாமி
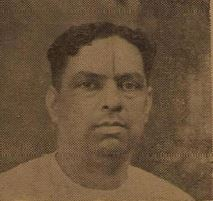
- Krishnaswamy in 1940s
- Born: 1905
- Died: 1987 (aged 81–82)
- Occupations: director, producer
- Years active: 1930s – 1971
- Known for: Sabapathy

A. T. Krishnaswamy (1905–1987) was an Indian director best known for the film Sabapathy.

== Career ==
Krishnaswamy joined the A. V. Meiyappan unit as an assistant during the mid-1930s and worked on all AVM projects. He made his directorial debut with Sabapathy (1941) and later left AVM for personal reasons. Krishnasami made films such as Vidyapathi and Manam Oru Kurangu. His most successful film was Arivaali, but his own success was shortlived. His later days were spent in obscurity, and he died on the same day as M. G. Ramachandran on Dec 24, 1987.

== Filmography ==
- Sabapathy (1941)
- Mani Malai (1941)
- Naveena Markandeya (1941)
- Vidyapathi (1946)
- Kangkanam (1948) (script writer)
- Deva Manohari (1949)
- Mohana Sundaram (1951)
- Rajambal (1951) (screenplay)
- Gumastha (1953) (screenplay)
- Bangaru Bhoomi (1954) (Telugu)
- Ponvayal (1954)
- Menaka (1955) (script writer)
- Arivaali (1963)
- Manam Oru Kurangu (1967)
- Arutperunjothi (1971)
