= Vana Mohini =

- Theatrical release poster
- Directed by: Bhagwan
- Written by: Bhagwan
- Produced by: N. Viswanatha Iyer
- Starring: K. Thavamani Devi; M. K. Radha; Baby Rukmini; Chandru (Elephant)
- Music by: C. Ramchandra
- Release date: 24 December 1941
- Country: India
- Language: Tamil

Vana Mohini is a 1941 Indian Tamil-language film written and directed by Bhagwan. The film stars Srilankan actress K. Thavamani Devi and M. K. Radha. Additionally, an elephant played an important role in the film.

== Plot ==
The story is about a tribal girl, played by K. Thavamani Devi, who lives in a forest with an elephant. A prince (M. K. Radha) comes to the forest in search of his uncle. The prince and the tribal girl meet and ultimately fall in love. Things are going well when they are caught by the villain. In the end, the prince kills the villain with the help of the elephant (Thavamani's companion), finds his uncle and eventually marries the girl.

== Cast ==
- Chandru (Elephant)
- K. Thavamani as the tribal girl
- M. K. Radha as the prince
- S. S. Kokko (Real name: Pasupuleti Srinivasulu Naidu)
- Kolathu Mani
- ‘Comedian' Ambi T.V. Krishnaswami
- Kamala Bai
- K. T. Sakku Bai
- Krishna Bai
- S. Basha
- S. R. K. Iyengar
- N. Appu
- Baby Rukmini

== Influences and remakes ==
The film was based on a Hollywood jungle film featuring Dorothy Lamour. Thavamani also wore a revealing sarong, as Lamour had in the original film. It was the first time such an outfit was worn in a Tamil film and played a major role in the film's success. The film was also remade in Sinhala as Wana Mohini (1957) by T. R. Sundaram and A. B. Raj.

== Production ==
Noted Hindi film actor Bhagwan wrote the script and directed the film. Besides K. Thavamani Devi and M. K. Radha, the film featured an elephant named "Chandru", which played a major role. It was perhaps the first and only instance where an elephant received top billing in the credits of a film. The film also featured Baby Rukmini as a child artist (the mother of actress Lakshmi).

The film's music was composed by C. Ramchandra (credited as Ram Chitalkar) and includes 10 songs, many of which are sung by the female lead. Thavamani's singing talents won her the title "Singalathu Kuyil" (English: (lit.) Sinhalese Cuckoo).

== See also ==
- List of Tamil films: 1940s
- Tamil films of 1941
- Albela
