= Burma Rani =

- Theatrical release poster
- Directed by: T. R. Sundaram
- Produced by: T. R. Sundaram
- Starring: K. L. V. Vasantha; T. R. Sundaram; C. Honnappa Bhagavathar; Serugulathur Sama; T. S. Balaiah
- Cinematography: W. R. Subba Rao
- Edited by: D. Dorairaj
- Music by: T. A. Kalyanam
- Production company: Modern Theatres
- Distributed by: Modern Theatres
- Release date: 13 April 1945
- Country: India
- Language: Tamil

Burma Rani (Tamil pronunciation: ['bəɾ.mɑː 'ɾaːɳɪ] transl. Queen of Burma) is a 1945 Indian Tamil-language war-spy film set against the backdrop of the Second World War. Directed by T. R. Sundaram, it starred K. L. V. Vasantha and Sundaram, himself. The film was released on 13 April 1945, during Puthandu. It was believed to be lost until 2006, until a copy was rediscovered and made available on DVD.

== Plot ==
The main plot revolves around a spy ring in Japanese-occupied Burma. It is led by a Tamil woman named Mangalam. She monitors General Bakjina, who is planning an attack on India. General Bakjina, the Japanese army commander, is modelled after Adolf Hitler.

The story intensifies when three Indian pilots crash-land in Japanese-occupied Rangoon. They hide in the house of Rani, an Indian dancer. The secondary plot is a love story between Ranjit Kumar, one of the pilots, and Rani. The pilots are captured and taken prisoner, and Ranjit is eventually killed. The story of the escape of the other two pilots forms the plot of the movie.

== Cast ==
- C. Honnappa Bhagavathar as Kumar
- Serukalathur Sama as Buddhist Monk
- K. K. Perumal as Uso
- T. S. Balaiah as Ranjith Singh
- S. V. Sahasranamam as Kundu Rao
- A. Dhasaratha Rao as Soni
- S. R. Sandow as Gotto
- N. S. Krishnan as Kunjitham
- Kali N. Rathnam as Koduchi
- V. M. Ezhumalai as Umpan
- M. E. Madhavan as Madhav
- K. L. V. Vasantha as Rani
- T. A. Mathuram as Banama
- C. T. Rajakantham as Miss Mangalam
- T. R. Sundaram as Colonel Bakinja

== Reception ==
Burma Rani was one among four war-effort films released in Madras in 1945. Upon its initial release, Burma Rani was appreciated by the British. The local war propaganda officer, G. T. B. Harvey, presided over the premiere of the film. However, Harvey later grew suspicious of the film’s portrayal of Japanese characters and withheld its commercial release, reflecting the ideological complexity of a war film set against the backdrop of India, Britain, and Japan. While the Japanese characters were negatively stereotyped, the Indian spies and military officers were portrayed with a nuanced patriotism that could be interpreted as anti-colonial.

It was eventually banned by the Madras censor board in post-independence India.
