= Shakthi Leelai =

- DVD cover
- Directed by: T. R. Ramanna
- Written by: Thuraiyur K. Moorthy
- Produced by: T. G. Somasundaram
- Starring: Gemini Ganesan; Jayalalithaa; Sivakumar
- Cinematography: M. A. Rahman
- Edited by: T. R. Srinivasalu
- Music by: T. K. Ramamoorthy
- Production company: Raaman Pictures
- Release date: 12 May 1972
- Running time: 163 minutes
- Country: India
- Language: Tamil

Shakthi Leelai (transl. The Plays of Goddess Shakti) is a 1972 Indian Tamil-language Hindu mythological film directed by T. R. Ramanna and written by Thuraiyur K. Moorthi. The film stars B. Saroja Devi, Gemini Ganeshan, Jayalalithaa, K. B. Sundarambal and K. R. Vijaya. It is noted for being the last multi-starrer mythological film. The music was provided by T. K. Ramamoorthy. It was successful at the box office.

== Cast ==
- Gemini Ganeshan as Shiva
- Ushanandini as Shakti/Samayapuram Mariamman
- Jayalalithaa as Periyapalayathu Bhavani amman/Punyakshi Devi
- Sivakumar as Narada Muni
- Major Sundararajan as Jamadagni Munivar
- Saroja Devi as Renukambal
- Usharani as Saraswati
- Master Sridhar as Parasuraman
- K. B. Sundarambal as Woman Saint
- S. V. Sahasranamam as The King
- Senthamarai as The Minister
- A. V. M. Rajan as Prohit
- Manjula as Poonguzhali, a Classical dancer
- Gandhimathi as Poonkuzhali's Mother
- K. R. Vijaya as Thangam
- K. Vijayan as Thangam's Husband
- S. A. Ashokan as Vaana Sooran
- Manorama as Kaveri
- V. K. Ramasamy as Kaveri's Husband
- Pakoda Kadhar as Gopal, Kaveri's Adaptive Son
- V. Nagayya as Tamil Pandit Devi Daasan
- K. Kannan
- Shanmuga Sundaram as Brinkki Munivar
- Karikol Raju as Washerman
- Udaiyappan as Vettiyan
- V. R. Thilagam as Vettiyan's Wife

== Soundtrack ==
The music was composed by T. K. Ramamoorthy and lyrics were written by Kannadasan.

Songs	Singers	Length
"Sakthi Vandhaladi"	L. R. Eswari	03:19
"Ambikai Nadagam Akilam"	P. Susheela	03:18
"Malargal Enge"	P. Susheela	04:03
"Unnai Thaan Paarthen"	T. M. Soundararajan	03:17
"Kalai Pozhuthae Varuga"	P. Susheela	02:52
"Thannai Vendravan Yaarum"	M. S. Rajeswari	04:25
"Mullai Poo Pole Pillai"	Sarala and Pattu	06:22
"Urangak Koodathu Kanne"	M. R. Vijaya	03:35
"Engum Deivam"	K. B. Sundarambal	
"Sakthi Ennum Deivam"	K. B. Sundarambal	
