= Uyir Mel Aasai =

- Poster
- Directed by: C. P. Jambulingham
- Written by: T. N. Balu
- Starring: Jaishankar; L. Vijayalakshmi
- Cinematography: Karnan
- Music by: S. M. Subbaiah Naidu
- Production company: Ayyappan Productions
- Release date: 1967
- Running time: 170 minutes
- Country: India
- Language: Tamil

Uyir Mel Aasai (transl. Will to Live) is a 1967 Indian Tamil-language drama film directed by C. P. Jambulingham and produced by Ayyappan Productions. The film stars Jaishankar, L. Vijayalakshmi and K. B. Sundarambal.

== Cast ==
Adapted from World Filmography: 1967:

- Jaishankar
- L. Vijayalakshmi
- K. B. Sundarambal
- K. A. Thangavelu
- Nagesh
- S. A. Ashokan

== Production ==
Uyir Mel Aasai was directed by C. P. Jambulingham and produced by Ayyappan Productions. The screenplay was written by T. N. Balu, and the cinematography was handled by Karnan.

== Music ==
The music of the film was composed by S. M. Subbaiah Naidu, with lyrics by Kannadasan.

== Reception ==
Kalki panned the film. In 1993, Sachi Sri Kantha wrote the film "is a mediocre Tamil movie [...] The only redeeming feature of that movie, as far as I can remember, was the Paapa [child] song of poet Kannadasan, which was sung by Carnatic diva K.B.Sundarambal. Kannadasan’s verse and Sundarambal’s voice! – splendid, is the only adjective one can use for that super combination."

== Bibliography ==
- Cowie, Peter; Elley, Derek, eds. (1977). World Filmography: 1967. Fairleigh Dickinson University Press. ISBN 0-498-01565-3.
