= Thunaivan =

- Theatrical release poster
- Directed by: M. A. Thirumugam
- Written by: V. Balamurugan
- Produced by: Sandow M. M. A. Chinnappa Thevar
- Starring: Sridevi; A. V. M. Rajan; Sowcar Janaki; K. B. Sundarambal; Nagesh
- Cinematography: N. S. Varma
- Edited by: M. G. Balu Rao; M. A. Thirumugam
- Music by: K. V. Mahadevan
- Production company: Dhandayuthapani Films
- Release date: 4 July 1969
- Running time: 156 minutes
- Country: India
- Language: Tamil

Thunaivan (transl. Companion) is a 1969 Indian Tamil-language devotional film directed by M. A. Thirumugam and produced by Sandow M. M. A. Chinnappa Thevar. It was written by V. Balamurugan, while the music was composed by K. V. Mahadevan. The film stars Sridevi, A. V. M. Rajan and Sowcar Janaki while Major Sundarrajan, Nagesh, Sachu, Vennira Aadai Nirmala and K. B. Sundarambal feature in supporting roles. The film marked the first leading film role of Sridevi's career at the age of five, playing Muruga. It was partially filmed in black and white and Eastmancolor, and was a commercial success, running in theatres for over 100 days. The film was remade in Hindi as Maalik.

== Plot ==
Velayudham (A. V. M. Rajan), an orphan and a devotee of Hindu deity Murugan lives in the Murugan Temple of Pooncholai town with the support of the priest Ponnambalam (Senthamarai). The temple trustee (Major Sundararajan) comes for a special Pooja and notices the ruby stone missing in the deity's spear. He blames Velayudham and beats him and threatens to send him out of the town if it is not returned by him the next day. An upset Velayudham pleads with Murugan for justice and since the stone could not be traced, Ponnambalam gives his relative contact in Coimbatore and tells him to leave the town to avoid getting any punishment from the trustee. The next day, Ponnambalam finds the ruby inside the temple and rushes to stop him but it is too late as Velayudham has already left by train. On reaching Coimbatore, he loses his bag containing the address of Ponnambalam's relative. Lost in a new place, he finds solace in a discourse happening there by Kirupananda Variar and believes that Murugan will certainly help him.

While buying Murugan's portrait from Paramasivam (Nagesh) shop, Velayudham gets the address chit which he had lost and realises that the person he was supposed to meet is none other than Paramasivam. Velayudham gets a job from Bhama (Sachu), a fruit shop vendor close to paramasivam, and sells fruits on the roadside. He does very good business and saves up all the money. One day he gets help from Maragatham (Sowcar Janaki) in getting the money due from her friends, who try to cheat him.

One day, Velayudham helps an old man (V. S. Raghavan) with epilepsy struggling at the Murugan temple. Velayudham's help and sincerity in taking care of the old man's briefcase full of money impresses him and he offers Rs.10, 000/- as a token of his appreciation. Using that money, Velayudham starts a fruit stall, which becomes successful. He later starts jewellery shop and many other businesses. He soon becomes a rich businessman in the city and helps many people with his wealth.

Velayudham helps to retrieve Maragatham's stolen chain from his shop by a thief and she is very grateful. He chances upon the temple trustee on the road and invites him for lunch and the trustee comes with his daughter who to Velayudham's surprise is Maragatham. They both likes each other and the trustee notices this and proposes marriage between them. The marriage takes place and they commence a happy life.

One day, Velayudham asks Maragatham to accompany him to the Murugan temple at his hometown for the annual Pooja but she refuses. She tells him that she is an atheist and Velayudham is God to her and her home is her temple. She does not believe in God and temples. Velayudham is shocked and carries on with his plan. One day Kirupananda Variar comes home and Maragatham refuses to take his blessings as she does not believe in Sadhus also. Variar leaves a letter advising him to let her be for now.

Days pass by and Maragatham becomes pregnant. She delivers a very sick baby boy with birth defects. Velayudham is shattered and keeps praying to God and blames her disbelief for the boy's condition. Velayudham requests her to come with him to the temples with the child but she refuses. A year passes by and all doctors give up on the baby and finally her that only God can save the child without going to the temple and agrees to join him.

They both start visiting Murugan temples across many towns with the child. One day, while Maragatham is bathing, a snake comes near the child and in desperation she calls out Murugan's name and a peacock appears and takes away the snake. She realises the presence of God there and starts believing and joins Velayudham in praying for the recovery of her child. They both meet Kirupananda Variar and seek his blessings in one of the temples. Finally, they visit Tiruchendur Temple along with another Devotee (K. B. Sundarambal) and pray to Murugan there.

They both pleads to Murugan by ringing the temple bell continuously for many hours and faint. Their prayers work and Murugan (Sridevi) appears as a child and rings the bell. The bell falls down, breaking the floor and water seeps out on the baby. The child recovers and becomes normal, making everyone happy. Velayudham, Maragatham and others pray to Murugan for his blessings.

== Cast ==
- Sridevi as Lord Murugan (Cameo Appearance)
- A. V. M. Rajan as Velayutham
- Sowkar Janaki as Maragatham
- Major Sundarrajan as Maragatham's Father
- Nagesh as Paramasivam (Fruit Shop laber)
- Sachu as Bama (Fruit Shop Woner, Hip painer)
- Vennira Aadai Nirmala as dancer (Cameo Appearance)
- K. B. Sundarambal as devotee of murga
- Kirupanandha Variyar as himself
- V. S. Raghavan as a business man (Cameo Appearance)
- Sandow M. M. A. Chinnappa Thevar as Kirupanandha Variyar's assistant
- Senthamarai
- K. Gurusamy
- Sundhari
- Jeevaa
- P.S. Venkitachalam
- K. A. Naacchiyappan
- P. A. Velayutham
- K. V. Sokkalingam
- C. J. Gopalan
- S. Rajendhiran
- K. P. Vishwanathan
- P. Narayanan
- G. Sundaram
- T. G. Seethaaraaman
- P. Maadhavan
- S. G. Krishnan
- S. M. Meyyappan
- Chandhra
- Rajeswari
- Umaa

== Production ==
Actress Sridevi made her acting debut at the age of four with this film in the role of Muruga. Although the makers wanted her to shave her head for the role, she ultimately did not do so. It was partially filmed in black and white and Eastmancolor.

== Soundtrack ==
The soundtrack was composed by K. V. Mahadevan and assisted by Pugazhendhi. Lyrics were written by Kannadasan and A. Maruthakasi.

Track listing
No.	Title	Artist(s)	Length
1.	"Naan Yaar Enbathai"	T. M. Soundararajan, P. Susheela	03:35
2.	"Gokulathil Oru Iravu"	L. R. Eswari	03:54
3.	"Marudhamalai Meethile"	T. M. Soundararajan, P. Susheela	08:39
4.	"Pazhanimalai Meethile"	K. B. Sundarambal	02:10
5.	"Gnanamum Kalviyum"	K. B. Sundarambal	03:36
6.	"Andru Nee"	K. B. Sundarambal	01:17
7.	"Koopitta Kuralukku"	K. B. Sundarambal	00:51
8.	"Kondadum Thiruchendur"	K. B. Sundarambal	01:22
Total length:			24:04

== Release and reception ==
Thunaivan was released on 4 July 1969. The Indian Express wrote, "If you can ignore the cinema medium, ignore the shortcomings in acting, story, direction and the craft of film-making but are bent upon seeing only the Murugasthalas, you will not be disappointed."

== Accolades ==
1969 National Film Awards

- Best Female Playback Singer – K. B. Sundarambal

1969 Tamil Nadu State Film Awards

- Best Story Writer – Balamurugan
- Best Female Playback Singer – K. B. Sundarambal
- Best Lyricist – A. Maruthakasi
