= Madana Kama Rajan =

- Poster
- Directed by: B. N. Rao
- Written by: B. S. Ramiah
- Produced by: K. S. Gopalakrishnan
- Starring: K. L. V. Vasantha; V. V. Satagopan
- Cinematography: Adi M. Irani
- Edited by: J. L. Sircar
- Music by: Parthasarathy; Rajeswara Rao
- Production companies: Gemini Studios, Amirtham Talkies
- Distributed by: Gemini Studios
- Release date: 28 November 1941
- Running time: 198 min. (17,907 feet)
- Country: India
- Language: Tamil

Madana Kama Rajan (pronounced [madana kaːma ɾaːdʑan]) is a 1941 Indian Tamil-language adventure film directed by B. N. Rao and produced by S. S. Vasan. It was the first film for Vasan as producer for Dindugal Amirtham Talkies.

== Plot ==
Madana Kama Rajan is a tale of the adventures of a prince (V. V. Sadagopan) and his friend (N. Krishnamurthi).

== Cast ==
Cast according to the opening credits of the film

Male cast

- V. V. Satagopan as Madana Kama Rajan
- N. Krishnamurthi as Gunaseelan
- Kothamangalam Subbu as Rajaguru
- T. S. Durairaj as Dhandavan
- M. R. Swaminathan as Somadevan
- V. P. S. Mani as Mayendra Varman
- Puliyur Duraisami Iyer as Boy
- G. V. Sharma as Bhimavarman
- K. Sivaraman as Vengaian
- T. Gopal Rao as Torturer
- S. G. Rajam as Sangan

Female cast

- K. L. V. Vasantha as Premavalli
- M. V. Rajamma as Sathyavathi
- K. R. Chellam as Kamavalli
- M. S. Sundari Bai as Bhagavathi
- E. S. Kamalakumari as Rasika
- K. T. Sakku Bai as Lakshmakkal
- K. V. Lakshmi Devi as Manmadan

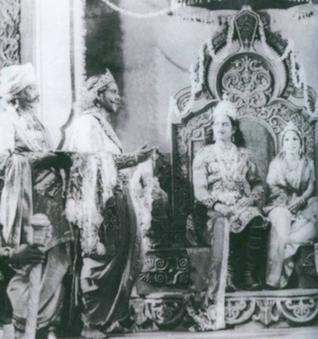

== Reception ==
The film was released on 28 November 1941 and was a commercial success. Gemini Studios went on to become a major player in the Tamil film industry. The Indian Express wrote, "The music in the film is essentially Carnatic and the humour is clean and intelligent, two very welcome reforms in the world of Tamil films."

== Soundtrack ==
Partial list of songs in Madana Kama Rajan:

- "Prema Premanee Illamal" – V. V. Sadagopan
- "Ennai Therri Thoodhu Sella" – K. L. V. Vasantha
- "Ambaa Un Paatham" – M. V. Rajamma
- "Kai Koduppen Amma" – M. V. Rajamma
