= Ezhandha Kadhal =

Ezhandha Kaadhal
- Directed by: K. S. Mani
- Screenplay by: Yadhartham Ponnusamy Pillai
- Based on: Ezhandha Kaadhal - Play staged by Thiruchi Amateur Sangam
- Produced by: N. S. Krishnan
- Starring: N. S. Krishnan; T. A. Mathuram; K. P. Kamakshi
- Cinematography: E. R. Cooper
- Edited by: Surya
- Music by: N. S. Balakrishnan; K. M. Gowrisan
- Production company: Asoka Films
- Release date: 1941
- Country: India
- Language: Tamil

Ezhandha Kadhal (transl. Lost Love) is a 1941 Indian Tamil-language film directed by K. S. Mani. The film stars N. S. Krishnan, T. A. Mathuram, T. Premavathi and K. P. Kamakshi.

== Plot ==
A rich man on his deathbed gave 5000 rupees to his trusted friend and asked him to take care of his motherless daughter Padma and to marry her to Jagadish when she came to the right age. The friend, Somanathan Pillai undertakes his friend's request. Padma comes to live with Somanathan Pillai's family. Jayapalan, a son of Somanathan Pillai, likes Padma. They become lovers. However, Somanathan Pillai forcibly marries Padma to Jagdish as per his dead friend's wish. He also finds another bride, Saroja, for Jayapalan. But then both Jayapalan and Padma are not happy in their respective married lives. Jayapalan becomes a drunkard and loses eyesight on a stormy night. A sacred sadhu enters the scene. How he solves all the problems forms the rest of the story.

== Cast ==
List adapted from the song book

- N. S. Krishnan as Venu
- T. A. Mathuram as Veni
- T. P. Ponnusami Pillai as Somanatha Pillai
- K. P. Kamakshi as Jagadish
- O. N. Kittu as Jayapal
- C. S. Jayaraman as Sadhu
- T. R. Ramasami as Astrologer
- P. A. Subbaiah Pillai as Sundaram Pillai
- N. S. Velappan as Rajaram

- P. G. Kuppusami as Sivakozhandhu
- E. Krishnamurthi as Music Teacher
- P. V. Chinnasami as Narendran
- Master Radhakrishnan as Gopal
- M. Raghavan as Shankaran
- Chellappa as Beggar Boy
- T. Premavathi as Padma
- M. R. Mangalam as Saroja

== Production ==
The film was produced by N. S. Krishnan under his own banner Asoka Films and was directed by K. S. Mani who was a member of the N. S. Krishnan's unit. Cinematography was handled by E. R. Cooper while the editing was done by Surya. The film was shot at Central Studios, Coimbatore.

Another film Chandrahari was packaged together as Part 2 with this Part 1 film.

== Soundtrack ==
Music was composed by N. S. Balakrishnan and K. M. Gowrisan. N. S. Krishnan, T. A. Mathuram and C. S. Jayaraman sang the songs.

== Reception ==
Film historian Randor Guy wrote in 2014 that the film is "Remembered for the melodramatic storyline, pleasing music rendered by C. S. Jayaraman and comedy sequences of NSK and Mathuram.
