= Mani Malai =

- Poster
- Release date: 1941
- Country: India
- Language: Tamil

Mani Malai (pronounced [maɳimaːl̪aɪ̯]) is a 1941 Indian Tamil-language anthology film. It consists of four short comedy films — Ashaadabuthi, Minor-in Kaathal, Abbuthi Adigal and Naveena Markandeyar — each made by a different director and featuring a different cast. The anthology film was successful.

== Cast ==
Ashaadabuthi

- P. B. Rangachari as the bhagavathar
- Jaya as the domestic help
- K. S. Adhilakshmi as the bhagavathar's wife
- T. V. Sedhuraman as the bhagavathar's disciple
- M. R. Subramaniyam as the Village headman

Minor-in Kaathal

- T. S. Durairaj as the "minor" (Note: In archaic Tamil vernacular, a "minor" is a young man living luxuriously on inherited wealth.)
- K. S. Adhilakshmi as the washerwoman
- M. R. Swaminathan as the washerwoman's husband

Abbuthi Adigal

- P. B. Rangachari as Adigal
- T. N. Meenakshi as Adigal's wife
- V. N. Sundaram as the saint/poet
- V. N. Janaki as a dancer
- Krishna Bai as a dancer

Naveena Markandeyar

- Kali N. Rathnam as Yama
- T. R. Ramachandran as Markandeya
- K. Hiranaiah is Chitragupta

== Production ==
Mani Malai is an anthology film consisting of four short comedy films, each made by a different director. The first, Ashaadabuthi, explores the serious issue of untouchability in a light manner, and was directed by Fram Sethna. The second, Minor-in Kaathal, revolves around a "minor" refusing to marry the woman of his mother's choice. The third, Abbuthi Adigal, is a story of "godly devotion dealt with humour". The fourth, Naveena Markandeyar, tells the story of Markandeya in a parodical manner and was directed by A. T. Krishnaswamy. Shooting for Mani Malai took place at Vel Pictures Studio, Guindy.

== Release and reception ==
Mani Malai was released in 1941 and was a commercial success; according to Krishnaswamy, it was due to "the presence of top comedy actors of that era". The Indian Express wrote, "Usual slap-stick inescapably lapsing into cheap humourising of domestic life is provided."
