= R. B. Lakshmi Devi =

South Indian theater and film actress

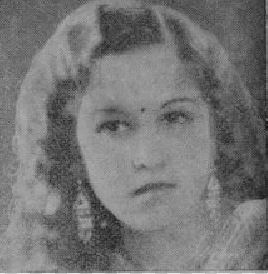
R. B. Lakshmi Devi

R. B. Lakshmi Devi (born February 2, 1917) is a South Indian theater and film actress. She played the lead role in Srinivasa Kalyanam, the first Tamil film produced in Chennai.

== Biography ==
Devi was born into a wealthy family in North Chennai.

Devi made her film debut with director C. V. Ramana. Her brother, A. Narayanan, made his debut in a talking film Srinivasa Kalyanam (1934). She later appeared as a stunt actress in several Tamil films produced in Bombay.

In the early 1950s, Devi settled at 70 Lloyds Road, Chennai. She was the first to settle in Lloyd's Road, where many celebrities of the Tamil film industry lived. She later shifted to Gopalapuram Ganapathi Colony near Lloyds Road.

== Filmography ==
- Srinivasa Kalyanam (1934)
- Dharma Pathini (1936)
- Danger Signal (1937)
- Pakka Rowdy (1937)
- Anandha Ashramam (1939)
- Toofan Queen (1940)
- Prem Bandhan (1941)
- Malaimangai (1947)
- Veera Vanitha (1947)
