= Manimekalai (1940 film) =

- Theatrical release poster
- Directed by: Bomman Irani
- Screenplay by: A. M. Somarajulu; S. Ramaiah
- Based on: Manimekalai by Chithalai Chathanar
- Produced by: T. Krishnachand
- Starring: K. B. Sundarambal
- Cinematography: Bomman Irani
- Music by: Papanasam Sivan; Papanasam Rajagoplan
- Production company: T. K. Productions
- Release date: 23 November 1940
- Country: India
- Language: Tamil

Manimekalai (also known as Balasanyasini) is a 1940 Indian Tamil-language film directed and photographed by Bomman Irani. It is based on the epic of the same name by Chithalai Chathanar. The film stars K. B. Sundarambal as the title character. It was released on 23 November 1940, and failed commercially.

== Cast ==
- K. B. Sundarambal as Manimekalai
- Kothamangalam Seenu as Udayakumaran
- N. S. Krishnan as the sari vendor
- A. Sundaram as Madavi
- T. A. Mathuram as Kunchalam

== Production ==
Manimekalai is the first film based on the Chithalai Chathanar-written epic of the same name, one of the Five Great Epics of Tamil literature. It was directed and photographed by Bomman Irani, and produced by T. Krishnachand under T. K. Productions while the screenplay was written by A. M. Somarajulu and S. Ramaiah. The final length of the film was 17,500 feet (5,300 m). The film was launched in 1938, but took a long time to complete due to various reasons, mainly financial. Additionally, distributors were reluctant to pick the film up even after its completion.

== Soundtrack ==
The songs were composed and written by Papanasam Sivan and his brother Papanasam Rajagopalan. The songs were released via Columbia Records. Songs such as "Aanandamey Yaarukku", "Niddhiraiyilum Bhayamundo", "Buddhabhiraaney", "Namakini Yethu Sogamey" and "Siraichaalai Enna Seyyum" attained popularity. Sundarambal would later sing "Siraichaalai Enna Seyyum" at various Indian National Congress party meetings.

== Release and reception ==
Manimekalai was released on 23 November 1940, and had an alternate title: Balasanyasini. N. R. B. of The Indian Express wrote, "Few of our Tamil films which deal with Classical or Historical themes achieve in any marked measure sch fine blending of soulful acting, soul-stirring music and sublime philosophy. The producers of this film ought to be congratulated on their admirable choice of the film as well as the actress providing a second opportunity for K. B. Sundarambal, the queen of the Tamil stage to appear on the screen." However, the film was not commercially successful.
