= Pammal Sambandha Mudaliar =

Indian theatre director (1873–1964)

Pammal Vijayarangam Sambandham Mudaliar
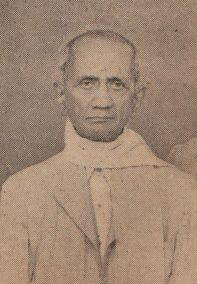
- Born: February 9, 1873; Pammal, Tamil Nadu, India
- Died: September 24, 1964 (aged 91)
- Education: Pachaiyappa's College
- Occupation: Playwright
- Relatives: Vijayarangam Mudaliar (father); Manikka Velammal (mother)

Pammal Vijayarangam Sambandham Mudaliar (1873–1964), who has been described as "the founding father of modern Tamil theatre", was a playwright, director, producer and actor of the late nineteenth- and early twentieth centuries. He was a recipient of the civilian honour of the Padma Bhushan.

== Birth and education ==
Pammal Sambandha Mudaliar was born in an aristocratic Thuluva Vellalar family of Pammal, near Madras to Vijayarangam Mudaliar and Manikka Velammal in 1873. He was educated at Pachaiyappa's College.

== Theatre ==
Influenced by his father, who had a large library and instilled in his son a love of books, and by his mother's telling of folktales and Indian epics, Mudaliar developed an interest in drama as a child. His father also encouraged him to see theatrical productions at a time when the theatre was considered to be a disreputable environment. Influenced in particular by his childhood reading of works written by William Shakespeare, Mudaliar wrote his own plays from an early age. He staged these at his home, along with his brother and sister, for audiences comprising family and neighbours.

According to a theatre review written by Kausalya Santhanam, Mudaliar founded the theatre company known as Suguna Vilasa Sabha to "revive and reform Tamil drama." S. Muthiah considers him to have been a co-founder, along with six other people. The company was established in July 1891 when Mudaliar was a 19-year-old student. It was inspired by his witnessing of the excitement caused when Sarasa Vinodini Sabha, an amateur theatre company headed by a lawyer, Bellary Krishnamacharlu, visited Madras to perform several Telugu productions in that year.

The first of his plays to be staged by the company was the unsuccessful Pushpavalli, in 1893 at the Victoria Public Hall in Madras. The lack of success did not deter him and nor did his full-time work as a lawyer and, later, as a judge: Mudaliar maintained his involvement in drama thereafter, as a writer, director, producer and actor. His initial effort was followed by Sarangadhara and before long his productions were being watched throughout the Madras Presidency.

According to Santhanam and also Scharada Bail, he wrote 96 plays, while S. Muthiar puts the figure at "over 100". In later life, and following the successful introduction of talkies to Tamil cinema in 1931, Mudaliar's output was also adapted for film. Among those are Sati Sulochana, Vedala Ulagam, Ratnavali, Manohara and Sabapathi. Manohara had originally been published by Mudaliar as an adaptation of Hamlet. Entitled Amaladhithan, it was not well received because it followed too closely the values of Western theatre; its rewriting as Manohara, which reflected more closely the values of Indian society, changed its fortunes. The original adaptation of Hamlet, published as Amaladhithan in 1906, took Mudaliar six years to complete and he studied many references in an attempt to do justice to the original Shakespeare work. It was one of five Shakespearean adaptations that he translated, directed and then acted.

Not all of Mudaliar's works were performed by the Suguna Vilasa Sabha, with one of the exceptions being his only work in the burlesque style, 1923's Chandrahari. It was his involvement with the company, which developed Tamil theatre as a respectable art form, that gave rise to the epithet of him being the founding father of Tamil theatre. Professional people such as lawyers and teachers took an interest in the company, including as actors, and thus he caused a shift whereby the old derogatory term for actors - Koothadi - was replaced by that of Kalaignan. He also changed the structure of dramatisations by emphasising the function of acts and scenes and also placing more stress on dialogue rather than song.

== Works of playwright ==
Mudaliar's work included adaptations of English and Sanskrit plays, as well as original output. These received with much enthusiasm. Educated people turned their attention to the potential of theatre. Some even joined the Sabha and began acting. It became a centre of great moral and educational value. Songs were given a back seat, prose gained significance, and realistic acting was stressed. Mudaliar changed stage conventions, creating new sets and scenery that surprised viewers. T. P. Krishnaswamy Pavalar, hailed as a great teacher of Tamil drama, was a product of the Sabha. After retiring as a judge, Mudaliar continued acting for it.

He acted the lead in many of his own plays. Subsequently, other sabhas or groups produced their own versions. His Lilavati-Sulochana in 1895, Manoham which was published in 1907, Makapati i.e. Shakespeare's Macbeth, published in 1910, and Sabhapati that published in 1918 were the first Tamil plays in prose dialogue while others still performed Puranic musicals. He gave equal importance to narrative and aesthetics in drama. He composed scripts that could be performed within three hours, a revolutionary concept when Tamil productions normally took twice that time. Quite a few were cinematised later, such as Yayati in 1908, Ratnavali was adapted from Harsha in 1910, and the originals mentioned above.

== Legacy ==
The title of the film Pammal K. Sambandam (2002), starring Kamal Haasan, was inspired by Mudaliar.

== List of works ==
- Leelavathy - Sulochanai
- Saarangatharan
- Mahapathy
- Kaadhalar Kankal
- Narkula Deivam
- Manokaran
- Oorvasiyin Saabam
- Idaichuvar Irupuramum
- Enna Nerdhidinum
- Vijayarangam
- Kalvar Thalaivan
- Dhaasip Penn
- Mei Kaadhal
- Pon Vilangukal
- Simhala Naadhan
- Virumbiya Vidhamea
- Siruth Thondar
- Kaalava Rishi
- Rajaputhra Veeran
- Unnmaiyaana Sakotharan
- Sathi-Sulochana
- Pushpavalli
- Geetha Manjari
- Uthamapathini
- Amaladhithyan
- Sabaapathy, First Part
- Pongal Pandikai (allathu) Sabaapathy, Second Part
- Orr Othikai (allathu) Sabaapathy, Third Part
- Sabaapathy, Fourth Part
- Peiyalla Pennmaniye
- Buddha Avadharam
- Vichuvin Manaivi
- Veathaala Ulakam
- Manaiviyaal Meendavan
- Chandrahari
- Subathiraarjunaa
- Kodaiyaali Karnan
- Sahadevan Soolchi
- Noakathin Kurippu
- Irandu Aathmakal
- Surgeon General Vithitha Marunthu
- Maalavikaakni Mithram
- Vibareethamana Mudivu
- Sulthan Peatai Sub Assistant Magistrate
- Sakunthalai
- Kaalappan Kalathanam
- Vikramorvasi
- Murpagal Seyyin Pirpagal Vilaiyum
- Naadaka Medai Ninaivukal - Six Parts
- Naadaka Thamil
- Yayaathi
- Piramananum Suthiranum
- Vaanipura Vanikan
- Irandu Nanbarkal
- Sathrujith
- Harichanthiran
- Markandeyar
- Rathnavali
- Kandupidithal
- Koneri Arasakumaran
- Sandhaiyil Kootam
- Vaikunda Vaithiyar
- Dhitchithar Kadhaikal
- Haasya Kadhaikal
- Kuramakal
- NallaThangal
- Sirukadhaikal
- Nadipukalaiyil Therchi Peruvathepadi?
- Haasya Viyaasangal
- Thamil Peasum Padakaakshi
- Viduthi Pushpankal
- Peasumpada Anubavangal
- Valli Manam
- Kadhambam
- Maandavar Meendadhu
- Aasthanapuram Naadaka Sabai
- Sangeetha Paithiyam
- Onbathu Kutti Naadakankal
- Sabaapathy Jameendar
- Sivaalayankal - Indhiyavilum, Appalum - Irandu Bakangal
- Sivaalaya Silpangal
- Sathi Sakthi
- Manaiyaatchi
- Indhiyanum Hitlerum
- Kaalak Kurippukal - (First edition-20/10/1947, Arutperunjothi Press-GT-Madras)

== Death ==
Pammal Vijayaranga Sambandha Mudaliar died in 1964.

Aside from his theatrical works, Mudaliar left a record of his own life that, according to theatre historian Kathryn Hansen, is a "treasure house of information on late-nineteenth and early-twentieth century Tamil theatre". These memoirs were originally published weekly in serial form by the nationalist-oriented Tamil newspaper, Swadesamitran, and have since been translated into English, in which form they comprise six volumes and are entitled Over 40 Years Before The Footlights. Their original title, when published in book form in 1938, was Natakametai Ninaivukal (Reminiscences of the Stage). He also wrote a short autobiography concerning his legal career, published in 1963 as En Chuyacharitai (My Autobiography).
