= Prem Bandhan (1941 film) =

1941 film by Bhagwan Dada

- Theatrical release poster
- Directed by: Bhagwan
- Screenplay by: S. G. Chellappa Iyer
- Story by: Padhuk Bhat
- Starring: M. K. Radha; T. Suryakumari; R. B. Lakshmi Devi; K. K. Swami
- Music by: Shanti Kumar Desai
- Production company: Famous Films
- Release date: 2 August 1941
- Country: India
- Language: Tamil

Prem Bandhan (transl. Bond of love) is a 1941 Indian Tamil-language romantic drama film directed by Bhagwan and produced by Famous Films. The film stars M. K. Radha, T. Suryakumari, R. B. Lakshmi Devi and K. K. Swami. It was released on 2 August 1941 and became a commercial success.

== Plot ==
Ananthu falls in love with two women, Lalitha and Neela. Bhaskar, a wealthy man, is also in love with Neela and tries to end her romance with Ananthu. Neela meets with a car accident and, to the surprise of everyone, reveals in her dying breathing that she had planned the accident so that Lalitha could marry Ananthu.

== Cast ==
- M. K. Radha as Ananthu
- T. Suryakumari as Lalitha
- R. B. Lakshmi Devi
- K. K. Swami as Bhaskar

== Production ==
Prem Bandhan was directed by Bhagwan and produced by the studio Famous Films. The story of the film was written by Padhuk Bhat, while the screenplay was written by S. G. Chellappa Iyer, the brother of actor S. G. Kittappa. P. Pullaiah supervised the making of Prem Bandhan. Three of the lead actors (Radha, Suryakumari and Lakshmi Devi) were A-listers in Tamil cinema at that time.

== Music ==
The music of Prem Bandhan was composed by Shanti Kumar Desai, while the lyrics were written by Kittappa.

== Release and reception ==
Prem Bandhan was released on 2 August 1941. Kay Orr of The Indian Express said, "Most of the scenes are long-drawn out and tedious. The film also falls a prey to the usual contagion of Tamil songs set to Hindustani tunes. The sooner films escape from this evil, the better for the Film industry in this part of the country." The film was a commercial success.
