= K. L. V. Vasantha =

Indian actress, singer and dancer

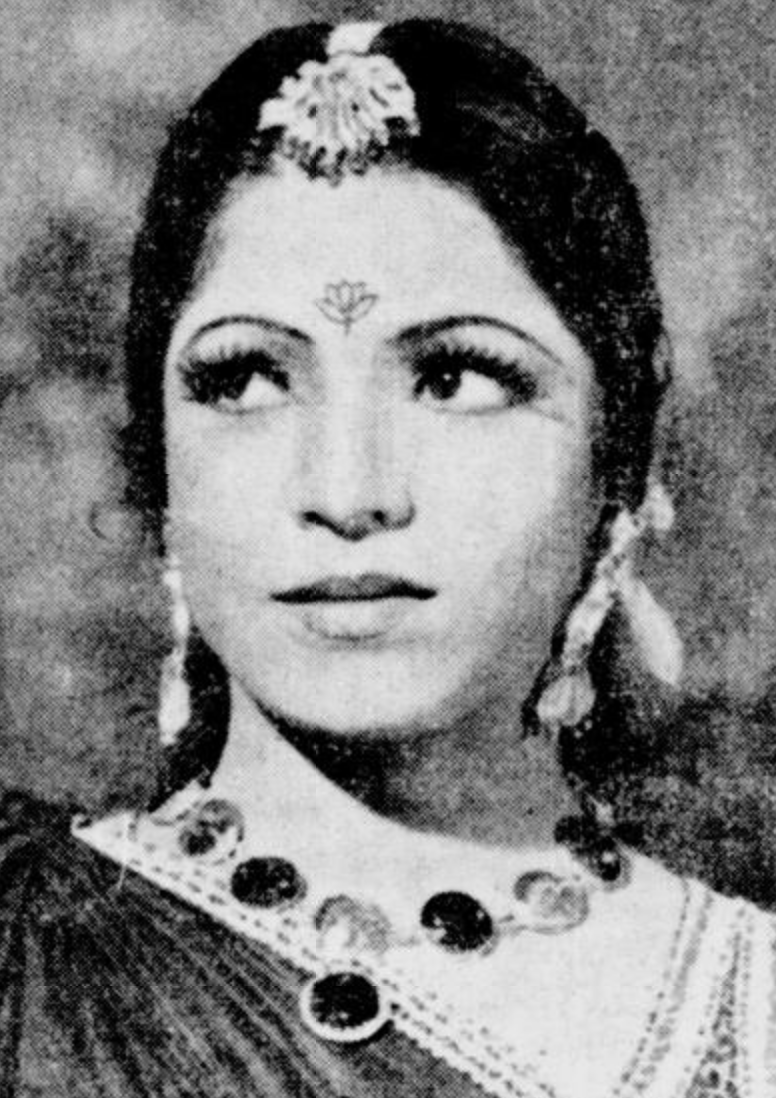
- Vasantha, from a 1945 newspaper advertisement for Subadra
- Born: 1923; Kundrathur, Ramanathapuram district, Tamil Nadu
- Died: 2008 (aged 84–85); Chennai, Tamil Nadu
- Citizenship: Indian
- Occupations: Actress, singer, dancer
- Spouse(s): K. K. Vasu; T. R. Sundaram

Kundrathur L. V. Vasantha (1923–2008) was an Indian actress, singer and dancer who worked mainly in Tamil language films.

== Biography ==
Vasantha was born in 1923 in Kundrathur, then in Ramanathapuram district. As a young girl, she was actively involved in singing and dancing. According to actress S. D. Subbulakshmi, Vasantha played a minor, uncredited role in Pavalakkodi (1934). After becoming a teenager, she appeared in B. N. Rao's Rambaiyin Kaathal (1939), a box-office success that catapulted Vasantha into stardom. Rao later cast her in Bhooloka Ramba (1940), also a hit.

When Gemini Studios opened in 1941, Vasantha portrayed the lead female character in its debut production Madanakamarajan, financed by Gemini founder S. S. Vasan. The success of this film further enhanced Vasantha's reputation. When Vasan planned Chandralekha in 1943, he announced that Vasantha would star as the lead female, but she was eventually replaced by T. R. Rajakumari. Vasantha shifted to Salem where she joined T. R. Sundaram's Modern Theatres, and played the female lead in many of Sundaram's films such as Rajarajeswari (1944), Burma Rani (1945) and Sulochana (1947).

Vasantha was already an accomplished dancer and singer, so she did both in most of her films. Her dance-drama sequence in Madanakamarajan became notable. In 1946, she played the lead roles in two Modern Theatres films: the Wahab Kashmiri-directed Chitra which was not successful, and Subhadhra. After acting in a few more films, she returned to Chennai (then known as Madras) and lived there till her death in 2008.

== Personal life ==
Vasantha married producer K. N. Vasu, following the death of her husband T.R.Sundaram (1907-1963), the founder of Modern Theatres in Salem.

== Partial filmography ==
Year	Film
1939	Rambaiyin Kaathal
1940	Satyavaani
1941	Madanakamarajan
1944	Raja Rajeswari
1945	Burma Rani
1946	Subathra
1947	Sulochana
