= K. Thavamani Devi =

Sri Lankan Tamil actress (1925-2001)

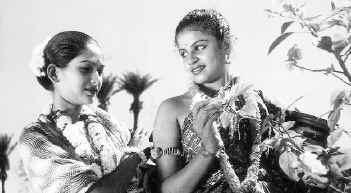
- K. Thavamani Devi (left) and M. S. Subbulakshmi in the 1940 film Shakuntala
- Born: c. 1925
- Died: 10 February 2001 (aged 76)

K. Thavamani Devi (c. 1925 – 10 February 2001) was a Sri Lankan actress who also worked in a number of Tamil films during the 1940s. Born and brought up in a wealthy family in Jaffna, Sri Lanka, her father was a successful barrister. Encouraged by her parents, Thavamani moved to Madras, India at an early age. She was from Sri Lankan Tamil heritage.

During her time in Madras, she learnt Bharata Natyam and Carnatic music, which helped her sing her own lines in many Tamil films. Her singing talents won her the honorific "Ceylon Kuyil" (English: (lit.) Ceylon Cuckoo). She was MGR's heroine in Rajakumaari (1947). Some of her other Tamil films include Shakuntala, Vana Mohini, Naatiya Rani, Krishna Kumar and Bhakta Kaalathi.

== Later years ==
She married a widower, Kodilinga Sankara Sastry of Rameshwaram, in November 1962 and retired to a spiritual life.
