= K. B. Sundarambal =

Indian actress and singer

K.B.Sundarambal
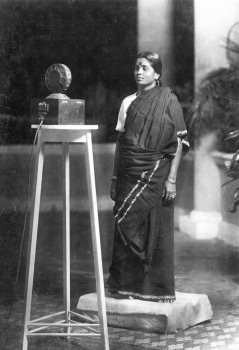
- Born: Kodumudi Balambal Sundarambal; 11 October 1908; Kodumudi, Coimbatore District, Madras Presidency, British India (now Erode District, Tamil Nadu, Tamil Nadu, India
- Died: 19 September 1980 (aged 71)
- Spouse: S. G. Kittappa (m. 1927–1933)
- Children: 0
- Awards: Padmashri; National Film Award for Best Female Playback Singer

Kodumudi Balambal Sundarambal (11 October 1908 – 19 September 1980) was an Indian actress and singer from Erode district, Tamil Nadu. She performed in Tamil cinema and was referred to as the "Queen of the Indian stage." A political activist during the Indian independence movement, K.B. Sundarambal was the first film personality to enter a state legislature in India.

== Early years ==
K.B. Sundarambal was born on 11 October 1908 in the town of Kodumudi on the banks of Kaveri river, in Erode district in Tamil Nadu. As a child, she made money by singing on trains and receiving tips.

== Acting career ==
According to some sources, it was while singing thus on a train for alms that the 19-year-old Sundarambal attracted the attention of F. G. Natesa Iyer, an amateur stage actor, producer and talent-scout. According to other sources, it was a police official named Krishnaswamy Iyer, an acquaintance of Balambal, who discovered the talent in Sundarambal and introduced the 19-year-old girl to P. S. Velu Nair, one of the reigning dramatists of that era.

In either case, Sundarambal is believed to have made her debut in 1927, on the Tamil stage, as a member of a travelling theatre troupe. She honed her voice while performing small roles on stage and keeping audiences entertained between acts. Soon enough, she was playing leading roles on stage. Her early stage plays like "Valli Thirumanam," "Pavalakodi" and "Harishchandra" proved to be great hits. In particular, "Valli Thirumanam", where she co-starred with S.G. Kittappa, was a phenomenal success.

== Personal life ==
Sundarambal and S. G. Kittappa met while working together in the theatre. They were married in 1927. The couple, together became popular. S. G. Kittappa died in 1933. Sundarambal left the stage after his death, to pursue a career as a concert artiste. K.B. Sundarambal died on 19 September 1980.

== Filmography ==
Sundarambal acted in films as well with notable appearances in Manimekhalai, Auvaiyar, Thiruvilayadal, Karaikal Ammaiyar and Kandan Karunai. She portrayed Tamil poet Avvaiyar in films Thiruvilayadal and Kandan Karunai. She also acted in social films such as Uyir Mel Aasai, Thunaivan and Gnayiru Thinggal. Gnayiru Thinggal was an unreleased film.

She sang in movies as well. She worked under music directors Mayavaram Venu, M. D. Parthasarathy, Parur S. Anantharaman, R. Sudharsanam, K. V. Mahadevan, S. M. Subbaiah Naidu, T. K. Ramamoorthy, M. S. Viswanathan and Kunnakudi Vaidyanathan.

Year	Film	Song	Music	Production company
1935	Nandanar (1935)	1. Piththam Theliya Marundhondrikkirathu; 2. Vazhi Maraithirukkudhe		Asandas Classical Talkies
1940	Manimekalai	1. Maasindri Kulamaadhar; 2. Siraichalai Enna Seiyum; 3. Paavi Yen Pirandhen		T. K. Productions
1953	Avvaiyar	1. Katrathu Kaiman Alavu; 2. Muthmizh Deivame Va; 3. Ayyane Anbarkku Meiyyane; 4. Ulaginile Thamizhnadu Uyarga; 5. Kooriya Vaalar; 6. Porumai Enum Nagai Anindhu; 7. Aram Seiyya Virumbuvelane; 8. Velane Senthamizh Viththaga....Mayilerum Vadivelane; 9. Koodi Nadandhukolla Vendum; 10. Kanni Thamizh Naattinile Vennilaave; 11. Gannanaathane Varuga; 12. Aalai Palaavaakkalamo; 13. Periyathu Ketkin; 14. Nellukku Iraitha Nir; 15. Munnai Nal Parikku; 16. Vennila Vea	Mayavaram Venu, M. D. Parthasarathy & Parur Anantharaman	Gemini Studios
1964	Poompuhar	1. Vazhkai Enum Odam; 2. Thappithu Vanthanappa; 3. Thunbamellam; 4. Andru Kollum Arasan	R. Sudharsanam	Mekala Pictures
1965	Gnayiru Thinggal (Unreleased)	1. Seeru Thamizh Paalundu Vetrikku Vel Kondu	M. S. Viswanathan	
1965	Thiruvilaiyadal	1. Gnanapazhathai Pizhindhu; 2. Pazhaniyappa; 3. Vasi Vasi Endru; 4. Ondranavan	K. V. Mahadevan	Sri Vijayalakshmi Pictures
1966	Mahakavi Kalidas	1. Sendru Va Magane; 2. Kalathil Azhiyatha	K. V. Mahadevan	Kalpana Kalamandir
1967	Kandan Karunai	1. Ariyathu Ketkindra; 2. Muruga Muruga	K. V. Mahadevan	ALS Productions
1967	Uyir Mel Aasai	1. Kelu Papa, Kelu Papa, Kelvigal Aayiram Kelu Papa; 2. Nalla Ganapathi.... Thunbikkai Nadhan Thunai; 3. Iyappa Abayam Koduppathunthan Kaiyappa	S. M. Subbaiah Naidu	Ayyappan Productions
1969	Thunaivan	1. Gnanamum Kalviyum; 2. Kondadum Thiruchendu; 3. Andru Nee; 4. Koopitta Kuralukku; 5. Kondadum Thiruchendur	K. V. Mahadevan	Dandayudhapani Films
1972	Shakthi Leelai	1. Amma...Sakthiyenum Deivam Konda Padai Veedu; 2. Enggeyum Sakthi Undu	T. K. Ramamoorthy	Raman Pictures
1973	Karaikkal Ammaiyar	1. Odungal Odi Ullam Urugi....Thagathagavena Aada Vaa; 2. Iraivaa Un Pugazh Paduven; 3. Piravatha Varam Vendum; 4. Padugingen Unnai Padugingren; 5. Vaduvatha Or Pozhuthum	Kunnakudi Vaidyanathan	Eveeyaar Films
1973	Thirumalai Deivam	1. Ezhumalai Irukka Namakkenna Manakkavalai; 2. Nalellam Unthan Thirunale	Kunnakudi Vaidyanathan	Shanthi Combines

== Political activism ==
Sundarambal and her husband S.G. Kittappa had been much influenced by the Indian independence movement and they became ardent supporters of the Indian National Congress. They had harnessed their popularity and talents to further that cause. Sundarambal continued to champion the movement, recording several gramophone discs extolling the struggle and sacrifices it entailed. She also made it a point to always wear khadi. She often actively campaigned in support of Congress party candidates at various elections. After India gained independence, K.B. Sundarambal entered the Legislative Council of Madras State in 1951 as a Congress nominee, thus becoming the first film artist to enter an Indian legislature.

Her mentor C.Satyamurthy was imprisoned by the British for participating in Quit India Movement in 1942.

== Honours ==
In 1964, the Tamil Isai Sangam conferred upon her the title of "Tamil Isai Perarignar (Most Learned in Tamil Music)." In 1970, the government of India awarded her the Padmashri for her contributions to the arts. She was awarded with the National Film Award for Best Female Playback Singer by the Government of India, for her work in Thunaivan. She also won the Tamil Nadu State Film Award for Best Female Playback for Thunaivan in 1969. She was also the first person in the Indian film industry to command a salary of one lakh rupees. She became the first lady member of Tamil Nadu Legislative Assembly.
