= S. G. Kittappa =

Indian actor

Shencottah Gangadhara Kittappaa
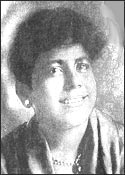
- Born: Ramakrishnan; 25 August 1906; Shencottah, Southern Division, Kingdom of Travancore, British India (now Sengottai, Tenkasi district, Tamil Nadu, India)
- Died: 2 December 1933 (aged 27); Madras, Madras Presidency British India (now Chennai, Tamil Nadu, India)
- Occupations: Stage actor, singer
- Years active: 1911–1933
- Spouse(s): Kittamal (m 1923); K. B. Sundarambal (m 1927 - Till death)

Shencottah Gangaadhaara Kittappa (25 August 1906 – 2 December 1933) was a Tamil classical singer and stage actor who was active in the pre-cinema days of the 1920s. His wife was the famous singer and film actress K. B. Sundarambal.

== Early life ==
Kittappa was born in a Tamil Brahmin Iyer family in Shenkottai in the then Kingdom of Travancore to Ganagaadhara Aiyer. He belonged to the Ashtasahasram subsect . He was Gangaadhara Aiyer's tenth child and third son, the others being Chellappa and Subbiah. Due to the weak financial condition of the family, Kittappa did not receive any formal education but was trained in music and screenplay by Sankaradas Swamigal.

== Stage career ==
Kittappa took to the stage early in his career and achieved remarkable success. His first stage appearance was at the age of five in Madurai. He appeared in dramas in Ceylon at the age of eight. The Ceylon Indian Chamber of Commerce awarded him a gold medal and certificate of appreciation for his artistic talents.

In 1919 the famous Kannaiya Nadaga Kuzhu recruited SGK to be part of them. He served them for 6 years. As his brother, Kaasi Aiyyer was a good harmonium player, he teamed up perfectly with Kittappaa to produce the best of songs to the standard prevalent in those days. As SGK sang and acted very well in a drama called "Kandi Raajaap" Justice Abdul Rahim awarded a golden shawl and "Kuthu Vilakku" for SGK.

Both SGK and his brother Kasi Aiyyer went to Ceylon to stage dramas. There K.B. Sundarambal was staging her own dramas. SGK and KBS met there for the first time. They then teamed up to perform several dramas. From there they went to Rangoon to stage dramas. They returned with much wealth. Upon their return, they continued to perform in Tamil Nadu. At times KBS and SGK acted in dramas like Thookku Thookki, Nandanaar, Dasavatharam Aandaal, etc. staged by the Kannaiya Nadaga Company.

=== Accolades and recognition ===
The north Indian Sangeetha Vidvan Pandit Vishnu Digambar Paluskar did not think highly of SGK. When SGK was asked to sing a song in Begada Ragam, SGK very fluently sang it only to shake up the Pandit. The Pandit who was scheduled to return by a night train stayed back to see SGK's drama, called "Krishna Vilasam". The Pandit was impressed and at the end of the drama he took off the garland from his own neck and placed it upon the neck of SGK and said "You are truly Krishna, no doubt". This Pandit had a great liking for the bhajan "Ragupathi Ragava Rajaram Patheetha Pavana Seetharam". Therefore, SGK made it a point to sing this piece at the tail end of his dramas in remembrance of their historical meeting.

At another time another famous north Indian Sangeetha Vidvan by the name of Pyaaraa Saheb came to perform his songs in the Victoria Public Hall of Madras. SGK also went to the show. At this show the Saheb sang the song "Sabaapathi kilasa" in Khamaas raaga. At night SGK staged his drama for which the Saheb turned up. In this drama, SGK sang the same song that the Saheb had sung earlier. As SGK was able to sing very well the Saheb went up the stage and offered him his own gold chain.

When SGK was performing in Vijayawada in Andhra Pradesh, the famous Andhra vidvan Kapilavaayi Ramanaatha Saastry sang the "Kori Bajanannu" keertana. In a few minutes SGK also sang the same keertana. Saastrigal immediately embraced SGK to show his appreciation.

SGK used to learn a few keertanas from Maayuram KV Raajaaraama Aiyer. Once SGK was on his way to Kumbakonam to perform a stage drama. On the way SGK saw KV Raajaaraama Aiyer and asked him how to sing the song in Shuddha Seemanthini Raaga. Aiyer sang for him. At night SGK sang the same raaga in his drama. Malaikkottai Govindasamy Pillai appeared on stage and awarded him a gold medal and glorified him to a superlative level. A few more vidvaans were also there to appreciate SGK. Kanjipuram Nayana Pillai appeared on stage and said "Had SGK taken up singing in katcheri, people like me would have become unknown figures." Likewise, Dakshinaamoorthy Pillai said that no other songs had stolen his heart as those sung by SGK. Mannarkudi Packirisaamy Pillai also glorified him.

T.N. Rajarathnam Pillai who had recognized the talents of SGK said that it was only SGK whom he considered to be in the forefront in the field of singing, and no one else. Chowdiah who was fascinated by the talents of SGK played the "pidil" (fiddle, violin) in his dramas for some time.

Mr and Mrs Eechim of Boston fame came to Tiruchirappalli and happened to witness the katcheri of Kittappa in the Rasika Ranjani Saba. The couple were deeply impressed; they made sure articles appeared in the American papers. The Mysore Mannar (Ruler) the Mannar (Ruler) of Thiruvangoor Mannar, and even Governors like Lord Livingston and Lord Curzon listened to the Sangeetham and awarded gold medals.

=== Charitable efforts ===
SGK was a great devotee and a patriot. He gave a lot of money to help the poor. SGK used his stage dramas to collect funds for the upkeep of temples and to many charitable causes.

== Personal life ==
When Kittappa was 16 years old in 1923, he was married to 11 year old Kittamma. Later Kittappa was captivated by the singing of upcoming singer K. B. Sundarambal. The two eventually fell in love and 'married' in 1927 though Kittappa was a Brahmin and Sundarambal (1908-1980) belonged to Gounder caste. The duo later performed together in the stage offering many hits. Kittappa and Sundarambal had a boy who died within two weeks. Kittappa and Sundarambal's relations soured, he went back to his first wife, and soon after that, his addiction to alcohol claimed his life in 1933.

== Death ==
Kittappa's efforts took a toll on his health due to excessive alcohol intake. Once while acting in a drama in Thiruvarur, he fainted and collapsed on stage, he was never revived after that. Kittappa eventually died in 1933 at the age of 27.

== Legacy ==
S.G. Kittappa was called the "Isayulaga Mannan" by various quarters.

He was very fluent in singing suram, but he never really supported it. He used to explain the ragas before starting his songs. He used to sing in Tamil. His pronunciation was said to be very clear. He is the first to have pulled the rural folks towards the katcheri songs.
