= Madurai Mani Iyer =

Indian singer

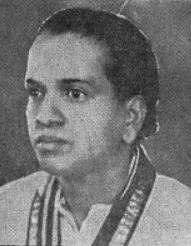
- Born: Subramanian; 25 October 1912; Madura, Madras Presidency, British India (now Madurai, Tamil Nadu, India)
- Died: 8 June 1968 (aged 55)
- Occupation: vocalist
- Parent(s): M. S. Ramasamy, Subbulakshmi

Madurai Mani Iyer (25 October 1912 – 8 June 1968) was an Indian Carnatic music singer, who was famous for his unique style. He was one of the most highly celebrated carnatic vocalists during the first half of the 20th century. He was renowned for his adept skills at singing kalpana swarams, neraval, and raga alapana. His music continues to be highly regarded today.

== Early life and education ==
Madurai Mani Iyer, whose original name was Subramanian, was born to M. S. Ramaswamy Iyer and Subbulakshmi in Madurai on 25 October 1912. His father, a Sub-court Clerk, was the brother of the famous Vidwan Pushpavanam, who was a great classical musician himself.

Mani Iyer's tutelage in music started at the age of nine. His first guru was Sri Rajam Bhagavathar who was Disciple of Ettayapuram Ramachandra Bhagavathar. Through Rajam Bhagavathar, he came in close contact with the great musician and composer, Gayakasikhamani Harikesanallur Muthiah Bhagavatar who founded Shri Thyagaraja Sangeetha Vidyalayam, a music school at Madurai and became an early disciple of the School.

Madurai Mani Iyer lived in Mayiladuthurai for ten years after moving from Madras in 1939 due to the Second World War. He later returned to Madras due to health concerns and the educational needs of his siblings.

== Awards ==
Iyer's prodigious talents were recognized early in his age as he received various honours from dignitaries of that time. In 1927, a music conference took place at the Congress session in Avadi. In that was arranged a programme on the 72 melaragamalika of Maha Vaidyanatha Iyer. Mani's father expounded on the theoretical aspect of the composition while Mani sang. Father and son walked away with the awards. The Ganakaladharar in 1944, Sangeetha Kalanidhi in 1959, President's award in 1960, Isai Perarignar in 1962 and many more came his way. He is also known for his English note.

== An autodidact ==
Madurai Mani Iyer was passionate about music but he had other interests too and one of them was the English language. Though a school drop out, Mani Iyer mastered this language and an anecdote goes that he would trudge from his house in Mylapore all the way to the Connemara Library to pick up books in English. He loved Bernard Shaw and was a fan of Charlie Chaplin. A compulsive listener of both the English and the Tamil news, Mani Iyer was a keen observer of politics too.
