= K. Rani (singer) =

Indian singer

Background information
- Born: Kisan Rani; 4 September 1942
- Died: 13 July 2018 (aged 75)
- Genre: Playback singing
- Occupation: Singer
- Instrument: Vocalist
- Years active: 1951–1963

K. Rani (4 September 1935 – 13 July 2018) was an Indian playback singer who has sung songs in Telugu, Tamil, Kannada, Malayalam, Sinhalese, Hindi, Bengali and Uzbek. Rani was the first female singer from India to sing in Sinhalese and Uzbek, and sang the national anthem of Sri Lanka (the "Sri Lanka Matha").

She performed before President of India Sarvepalli Radhakrishnan, and Indian National Congress leader K. Kamaraj called her "Innisai Rani". Rani was invited to perform at the Mokshagundam Visvesvaraya centennial, travelling in an aeroplane chartered by the government of Karnataka. Raj Kapoor provided the rhythms when she sang Hindi songs, including "O Maine Pyar Kia, Mai Kya Karu Ram Mujhe Budda Mil Gaya", at a stage show.

== Early life ==
Her family migrated from Kanpur to South India. Her father, Kishan Singh was a railway station master and was transferred frequently from station to station. This gave Rani an opportunity to become conversant with different languages. At the age of 5 or 6 she got a chance to sing on stage. She sang on stages where Vyjayanthimala's dance programs were taking place. She sang songs during the dress change-over interludes. One day, during such a program at Raja Annamalai Mandram, music composer C. R. Subburaman noticed the little girl's talent and introduced her as a playback singer in films.

== Life and career ==
Rani's first films, in 1951 at age eight, were the Telugu Roopavathi and Tamil Mohana Sundaram and Singari. A year later, she was singing for lead characters in films like Kalyani, Kalyanam Panni Paar, Pelli Chesi Choodu, Dharma Devadhai and Dharma Devadha. Rani's "Antha Bhranthi Yenaa" (Telugu) and "Ellaam Maayai Thaanaa" (Tamil), from 1953's Devadasu, were popular.

She first performed in Sri Lankan cinema for Sujatha in 1953 under the direction of composer Ananda Samarakoon, and contributed to Seda Sulang in 1955 and Sirimali in 1959. Much sought after during the 1950s, Rani had few songs in the early 1960s. She sang Dravida Munnetra Kazhagam (DMK) songs and recorded Tamil Islamic songs with Nagore E. M. Hanifa.

=== Music composers she sang for ===
- C. R. Subburaman
- Ogirala Ramachandra Rao
- S. Dakshinamurthi
- S. V. Venkatraman
- T. R. Ramanathan
- T. A. Kalyanam
- G. Ramanathan
- T. G. Lingappa
- G. Aswathama
- Ghantasala
- C. N. Pandurangan
- V. Nagayya
- M. S. Gnanamani
- M. S. Viswanathan
- Pendyala Nageshwara Rao
- T. Chalapathi Rao
- Master Venu
- K. V. Mahadevan
- Viswanathan–Ramamoorthy
- T. V. Raju
- S. Rajeswara Rao
- M. K. Athmanathan
- A. V. Natarajan
- T. G. Lingappa
- Ananda Samarakoon
- L. Malleswara Rao
- Vedha
- M. Ranga Rao
- Arun & Raghavan
- S. Hanumantha Rao
- Vimal Kumar
- M. Subrahmanyam Raju
- R. Parthasarathy
- Ramesh Naidu
- Rajan–Nagendra
- S. L. Merchant & M. S. Sriram
- A. M. Rajah
- V. Dakshinamoorthy
- B. Gopalam
- Pamarthi
- V. Krishnamurthi
- P. Suri Babu
- Jeevan
- Mallik
- S. P. Kodandapani
- H. R. Padmanabha Sasthri
- M. B. Sreenivasan
- Satyam
- B. Shankara Rao
- Ghantasala Vijayakumar

=== Fellow playback singers ===
Rani sang duets mostly with Ghantasala. Also with A. M. Rajah, P. B. Sreenivas, T. M. Soundararajan, Thiruchi Loganathan, Seerkazhi Govindarajan, S. C. Krishnan, V. N. Sundaram, K. H. Reddy, Pithapuram Nageswara Rao, Madhavapeddi Satyam, Talat Mahmood, K. Appa Rao, D. B. Ramachandra, K. Prasad Rao, B. N. Rao, T. R. Jayadev, B. Gopalam, T. G. Lingappa, K. V. Mahadevan, C. R. Subburaman, J. V. Raghavulu, A. L. Raghavan, K. R. Chellamuthu, S. V. Ponnusamy, Maadhavan, T. K. Ramachandran, Subramanyam, K. P. Udayabhanu, K. J. Yesudas, Nagendra, Ananda Samarakoon, Dharmadasa Walpola, Mohideen Baig, Sunil Premadasa and Christy Leonard Perera.

She sang duets with female singers, most notably Jikki but also with P. Leela, P. Susheela, K. Jamuna Rani. A. P. Komala, A. G. Rathnamala, Radha Jayalakshmi, Soolamangalam Rajalakshmi, R. Balasaraswathi Devi, N. L. Ganasaraswathi, M. S. Rajeswari, S. Janaki, Kalyani, Ramola, Sundaramma, T. S. Bagavathi, Swarnalata, N. Lalitha, P. S. Vaideghi, Udutha Sarojini, M. S. Padma, G. Kasthoori and L. R. Eswari.

The singing actors she sang with were J. P. Chandrababu and P. Bhanumathi.

== Filmography ==
Year	Film	Language	Song	Music director	Co-singer
1950	Paramanandayya Sishyulu	Telugu	Polika Radha	Ogirala Ramachandra Rao & S. Dakshinamurthi	S. Dakshinamurthi
1950	Paramanandayya Sishyulu	Telugu	Chuchitava Janaka	Ogirala Ramachandra Rao & S. Dakshinamurthi	
1950	Paramanandayya Sishyulu	Telugu	Edira Lakshmana	Ogirala Ramachandra Rao & S. Dakshinamurthi	S. Dakshinamurthi
1950	Paramanandayya Sishyulu	Telugu	O Raaja	Ogirala Ramachandra Rao & S. Dakshinamurthi	
1950	Swapna Sundari	Telugu	Ohoho Maaraajaa	C. R. Subburaman & Ghantasala	
1951	Aakasa Raju	Telugu		P. L. Roy	
1951	Mayalamari	Telugu	Miyaam Miyaam He Huva Huva	P. Adinarayana Rao	Pithapuram Nageswara Rao
1951	Roopavathi	Telugu			
1951	Roopavathi	Telugu	Vayaari Raajaa Jilibi Valapula Raniroy		Jikki
1951	Singari	Tamil	Oru Jaan Vayire Illaattaal	S. V. Venkatraman, T. R. Ramanathan & T. A. Kalyanam	K. H. Reddy
1951	Singari	Tamil	Konaadha Maratthinile	S. V. Venkatraman, T. R. Ramanathan & T. A. Kalyanam	K. H. Reddy
1952	Athinti Kapuram	Telugu	Naa Jeevitha Saudhamu Nava	G. Ramanathan & S. Dakshinamurthi	S. Dakshinamurthi
1952	Athinti Kapuram	Telugu	Takku Takku Takku	G. Ramanathan & S. Dakshinamurthi	
1952	Athinti Kapuram	Telugu		G. Ramanathan & S. Dakshinamurthi	S. Dakshinamurthi
1952	Athinti Kapuram	Telugu	Mana Hrdhaya Viṇa Mrog	G. Ramanathan & S. Dakshinamurthi	
1952	Chinna Durai	Tamil	O Raagini Vaa Raagini	T. G. Lingappa	T. G. Lingappa
1952	Chinna Kodalu	Telugu	Ee Chaduvintekatha	G. Aswathama	
1952	Dharma Devatha	Telugu	Ye Voore Chinnadaana	C. R. Subburaman	K. Prasad Rao
1952	Dharma Devatha	Telugu	Lambaadi Lambaadi.... O Thagidi Baava	C. R. Subburaman	
1952	Dharma Devatha	Telugu	Pataku Pallavi Kaavaaloy	C. R. Subburaman	
1952	Dharma Devatha	Telugu	Chindu Veyavoi Chinni Krishnaiyaa	C. R. Subburaman	B. N. Rao
1952	Dharma Dhevadhai	Tamil	Joraana Minnal Polave	C. R. Subburaman	D. B. Ramachandra
1952	Dharma Dhevadhai	Tamil	Lambaadi Lambaadi.... Thalukku Kaatti Kulukki	C. R. Subburaman	
1952	Dharma Dhevadhai	Tamil	Paaduven Paarungo Thillaanaa	C. R. Subburaman	
1952	Dharma Dhevadhai	Tamil	Vaaraamale Irundhiduvaano	C. R. Subburaman	C. R. Subburaman
1952	Kalyanam Panni Paar	Tamil	Brammave Ye Brammave	Ghantasala	P. Leela & Udutha Sarojini
1952	Kalyanam Panni Paar	Tamil	Kalyanam Seidhu Kattiduvom	Ghantasala	Pithapuram Nageswara Rao
1952	Kalyanam Panni Paar	Tamil	Evan Vandhalum Vida Maatten	Ghantasala	Ghantasala
1952	Kalyanam Panni Paar	Tamil	Engu Sendrayo Piriya	Ghantasala	Pithapuram Nageswara Rao & P. Leela
1952	Kalyanam Panni Paar	Tamil	Emaali Endha Ooro	Ghantasala	Udutha Sarojini
1952	Kalyanam Panni Paar	Tamil	Ammaa Novudhe Ammammaa Novudhe	Ghantasala	Udutha Sarojini
1952	Kalyani	Tamil	Ini Pirivillaamale Vaazhvom Naam Ulaginile	G. Ramanathan & S. Dakshinamurthi	T. M. Soundararajan
1952	Kalyani	Tamil	Takku Takku Takku	G. Ramanathan & S. Dakshinamurthi	
1952	Kalyani	Tamil	Endha Kaariyamaayinum .. Ulagamidhuve Ulagamappaa	G. Ramanathan & S. Dakshinamurthi	S. C. Krishnan
1952	Kalyani	Tamil	En Vaazhvil Anbenum	G. Ramanathan & S. Dakshinamurthi	
1952	Pelli Chesi Choodu	Telugu	Brahmayya O Brahmayya	Ghantasala	P. Leela & Udutha Sarojini
1952	Pelli Chesi Choodu	Telugu	Amma Noppule Ammamma Noppule	Ghantasala	Udutha Sarojini
1952	Singari	Telugu	Aavo Maharaj..Oka Jan	S. V. Venkatraman, T. R. Ramanathan & T. A. Kalyanam	K. H. Reddy
1952	Singari	Telugu	Kotaru Manipaine Goodu	S. V. Venkatraman, T. R. Ramanathan & T. A. Kalyanam	K. H. Reddy
1952	Valaiyapathi	Tamil	Alli Alli Alli	S. Dakshinamurthi	S. C. Krishnan
1952	Valaiyapathi	Tamil	Ennam Pole Vaazhve	S. Dakshinamurthi	
1953	Amarakavi	Telugu		G. Ramanathan & T. K. Kumara Swamy	
1953	Chandirani	Tamil	Vaaraamale Vandha Naalidhe	C. R. Subburaman	
1953	Chandirani	Tamil	Meow Meow Meow	C. R. Subburaman	Udutha Sarojini & K. Jamuna Rani
1953	Chandirani	Telugu	Ravo Varaala Elika Konavoyi Kanukaa	C. R. Subburaman	
1953	Chandirani	Telugu	Meow Meow Meow	C. R. Subburaman	Udutha Sarojini & K. Jamuna Rani
1953	Chandirani	Telugu	Nalla Pilla Mee Malli Malli	C. R. Subburaman	A. P. Komala
1953	Chandirani	Hindi	Mera Billa Gora Hai Aur Teri Billi Kaali	C. R. Subburaman	
1953	Devadas	Tamil	Ellaam Maayai Thaanaa	C. R. Subburaman	
1953	Devadas	Tamil	Uravum Illai Pagaiyum Illai	C. R. Subburaman	Ghantasala
1953	Devadasu	Telugu	Antha Bhranthi Yenaa Jeevitana Velugintena	C. R. Subburaman	
1953	Devadasu	Telugu	Cheliya Ledhu Chelimi Ledhu	C. R. Subburaman	Ghantasala
1953	Gumastha	Tamil	Sopalaangi Maappillaikku	C. N. Pandurangan, G. Ramanathan & V. Nagayya	G. Kasthoori
1953	Jenova	Tamil	Sollaamale Kanne Pinne Varaadhe	T. A. Kalyanam, M. S. Gnanamani & M. S. Viswanathan	
1953	Kangal	Tamil	Pongi Malarudhe Mangaiyin	S. V. Venkatraman & G. Ramanathan	G. Kasthoori
1953	Kanna Talli	Telugu	Ide Ide Saaradu	Pendyala Nageshwara Rao	A. M. Rajah
1953	Mamiyar	Tamil		C. N. Pandurangan	
1953	Manjari	Telugu	Meere Cheppandayyaa Nyaayamu	H. R. Padmanaba Sastry	
1953	Petra Thai	Tamil	Nilavile Oyyaaram	Pendyala Nageshwara Rao	A. M. Rajah
1953	Petra Thai	Tamil	Maamayilpol Aadi	Pendyala Nageshwara Rao	
1953	Pichi Pullayya	Telugu	Rarara.... O Pantulugaru Vinavemayya	T. V. Raju	Pithapuram Nageswara Rao
1953	Prathignya	Telugu		T. A. Kalyanam	
1953	Puttilu	Telugu	Oh Ho Beauty	T. Chalapathi Rao	Pithapuram Nageswara Rao
1953	Sujatha	Sinhala	Sumadhura Wey	S. Dakshinamurthi	
1953	Sujatha	Sinhala	Ayyo Baa Baa	S. Dakshinamurthi	Dharmadasa Walpola & Sunil Premadasa
1953	Sujatha	Sinhala	Pem Rella Nage	S. Dakshinamurthi	Dharmadasa Walpola
1953	Sujatha	Sinhala	Manaranjana Darshaniya Lanka	S. Dakshinamurthi	
1953	Sujatha	Sinhala	Prema Gange	S. Dakshinamurthi	Mohideen Baig
1953	Thirumbi Paar	Tamil	Ponndutthu Padaitthaano	G. Ramanathan	A. M. Rajah & T. S. Bagavathi
1953	Vanjam	Tamil		T. A. Kalyanam	
1954	Anta Manavalle	Telugu	Aapevarevaru Nijaanni	Master Venu	Madhavapeddi Satyam
1954	Chandraharam	Tamil	Alaigal Sayanamae	Ghantasala	
1954	Chandraharam	Telugu	Evare Evare Challani Vennela	Ghantasala	
1954	Chandraharam	Telugu	Angikam Bhuvanam.... Jayajaya	Ghantasala	Ghantasala & M. S. Padma
1954	Jyothi	Telugu	Ole Ole Ole Ole Yinnawa	Pendyala Nageswara Rao	Manohar & Jogabai
1954	Koondukkili	Tamil	Vaanga Ellorume Ondraagave	K. V. Mahadevan	T. M. Soundararajan, V. N. Sundaram & Radha Jayalakshmi
1954	Latchathipathi	Tamil	Aaandhame Peraanandhame	T. Chalapathi Rao	A. P. Komala
1954	Latchathipathi	Tamil	Sariyaanadha Veenaanadha	T. Chalapathi Rao	
1954	Maa Gopi	Telugu	Maa Vadina Maa Vadina	Viswanathan–Ramamoorthy	Jikki
1954	Maa Gopi	Telugu	Yuvathi Yuvakulu Manamantaa	Viswanathan–Ramamoorthy	Pithapuram Nageswara Rao & T. Satyavathi
1954	Naalvar	Tamil	Lovekku Lovekku Love	K. V. Mahadevan	K. V. Mahadevan
1954	Nallakalam	Tamil	Kaandham Pol Paayum	K. V. Mahadevan	
1954	Nirupedalu	Telugu	Sir Polish	T. V. Raju	
1954	Panam Paduthum Padu	Tamil	Alai Modhum Seidhi	T. A. Kalyanam	
1954	Parivartana	Telugu	Kaadantaraa Meeru Kaadantaaraa	T. Chalapathi Rao	
1954	Praja Rajyam	Telugu	Rave Rave O Cheli	Viswanathan–Ramamoorthy	Pithapuram Nageswara Rao
1954	Praja Rajyam	Telugu	Vimala Premaye Jeevanaleela	Viswanathan–Ramamoorthy	Pithapuram Nageswara Rao
1954	Raju Peda	Telugu	Marindi Marindi Mana Rajakeeyame	S. Rajeswara Rao	
1954	Ratha Paasam	Tamil	Aanandha Vaibogam	M. K. Athmanathan & A. V. Natarajan	Jikki
1954	Sugam Enge	Tamil		Viswanathan–Ramamoorthy	
1955	Aada Bidda	Telugu	Rangulu Maarche Rangeli	T. V. Raju	Pithapuram Nageswara Rao
1955	Aada Bidda	Telugu	Sri Janakidevi	T. V. Raju	P. Susheela
1955	Anthe Kavali	Telugu	Okati Rendu Moodu	Pendyala Nageswara Rao	Raghunath Panigrahi
1955	Anthe Kavali	Telugu	Ravoyi Itu Ravoyi	Pendyala Nageswara Rao	
1955	Asai Anna Arumai Thambi	Tamil	Menagaiyum Naanuvaal	K. V. Mahadevan	
1955	Asai Anna Arumai Thambi	Tamil	Kaanaadha Kaatchigalai Paaru	K. V. Mahadevan	K. V. Mahadevan
1955	Cherapakura Chedevu	Telugu	Prema Prema Prema	Ghantasala	Ghantasala
1955	Cherapakura Chedevu	Telugu	Naatakam Aadudam	Ghantasala	Ghantasala
1955	Guna Sundari	Tamil	Therindhu Kolluveer Therindhu Kolluveer	Ghantasala	S. C. Krishnan
1955	Guna Sundari	Tamil	Thoodhu Sellum Kogilam	Ghantasala	Jikki
1955	Guna Sundari	Tamil	Thaaragai Solaiyile Vennilaave	Ghantasala	Jikki
1955	Guna Sundari	Tamil	Vaadaa Ennaasai Kannaalane Arugil Vaadaa Kolluveer	Ghantasala	
1955	Jayasimha	Telugu	Kondameeda Kokkirayi Kaalujari Koolipoye	T. V. Raju	
1955	Jayasimman	Tamil		T. V. Raju	
1955	Mathalan	Sinhala	Handa Raahu Mukayehi	R. Muttusamy	
1955	Kalvanin Kadhali	Tamil	Alli Malar Solai	G. Govindarajulu Naidu & Ghantasala	P. Bhanumathi & A. P. Komala
1955	Kathanayaki	Tamil	Ammammaa Aagaadhu Aavesam Koodadhu	G. Ramanathan	S. C. Krishnan
1955	Kathanayaki	Tamil	Pasi Pasi Pasi Parama Yezhaigalin	G. Ramanathan	S. C. Krishnan
1955	Mudhal Thethi	Tamil	Engum Inbame Pongum	T. G. Lingappa	A. P. Komala
1955	Mudhal Thethi	Tamil	Chinna Chinna Bommai Venum	T. G. Lingappa	T. V. Rathnam
1955	Porter Kandan	Tamil	Kondattam Kondattam	Viswanathan–Ramamoorthy	Tiruchi Loganathan, S. C. Krishnan, K. R. Chellamuthu & Maadhavan
1955	Porter Kandan	Tamil	Vidumurai Vidumurai Vidumurai	Viswanathan–Ramamoorthy	Baby Rajakumari, Krishnaveni & Baby Jaya
1955	Santosham	Telugu	Roopaayi Kaasulone Unnadi	Viswanathan–Ramamoorthy	P. Susheela
1955	Seda Sulang	Sinhala	Prem Prem Somibara Pemrali	Ananda Samarakoon	Dharmadasa Walpola
1955	Seda Sulang	Sinhala	Kellani Numbala	Ananda Samarakoon	Ananda Samarakoon
1955	Seda Sulang	Sinhala	Oo Enna	Ananda Samarakoon	
1955	Seda Sulang	Sinhala	Amu Pitisarayeki Me	Ananda Samarakoon	Dharmadasa Walpola & Sunil Premadasa
1955	Seda Sulang	Sinhala	Kavi Kada Kasi Soyala	Ananda Samarakoon	Dharmadasa Walpola
1955	Seda Sulang	Sinhala	Oya Thamayi	Ananda Samarakoon	Sunil Premadasa
1955	Seda Sulang	Sinhala	Jeevana Mea Gamana Sansare	Ananda Samarakoon	K. Jamuna Rani
1955	Ulagam Palavitham	Tamil	Akkam Pakkam Yaarum Kanndaa	N. S. Balakrishnan	Thiruchi Loganathan
1955	Ulagam Palavitham	Tamil	Ulagam Palavitham Aiyaa	N. S. Balakrishnan	Puthuvai Loganathan, N. S. Balakrishnan & A. G. Rathnamala
1955	Vadina Gari Gajulu	Telugu	Varunaki Thagina	Ghantasala	
1956	Balasanyasamma Katha	Telugu	Attha Varintikee	S. Rajeswara Rao	P. Leela & P. S. Vaideghi
1956	Balasanyasamma Katha	Telugu	Kala Kalalade Satikipatiki	S. Rajeswara Rao	P. S. Vaideghi
1956	Balasanyasamma Katha	Telugu	Oho Oho Nimmapandu	S. Rajeswara Rao	Pithapuram Nageswara Rao
1956	Amara Geetham	Tamil	En Kanne En Kanne	Ghantasala	K. Jamuna Rani
1956	Amara Geetham	Tamil	Raamanaam Ennum Mittaai	Ghantasala	Seerkazhi Govindarajan & K. Jamuna Rani
1956	Bhagyodaya	Kannada	Anandha Gokula	L. Malleswara Rao	R. Balasaraswathi Devi & Subramanyam
1956	Bhale Ramudu	Telugu	Endunnavo Madhavaa	S. Rajeswara Rao	Jikki
1956	Charana Daasi	Telugu	Nede Kadaa	S. Rajeswara Rao	Madhavapeddi Satyam
1956	Charana Daasi	Telugu	Yekkadunnadi	S. Rajeswara Rao	Jikki
1956	Chiranjeevulu	Telugu	Enchakka Enchakka	Ghantasala	Jikki
1956	Chiranjeevulu	Telugu	Raamanamanu Mitaayi	Ghantasala	Madhavapeddi Satyam & K. Jamuna Rani
1956	Illarame Inbam	Tamil	Nadagamellam Aadalam	Ghantasala	Seerkazhi Govindarajan
1956	Illarame Inbam	Tamil	Prema Prema Prema	Ghantasala	Seerkazhi Govindarajan
1956	Kaalam Mari Pochu	Tamil	Punnagai Thanai Veesu	Master Venu	Thiruchi Loganathan & Jikki
1956	Kaalam Mari Pochu	Tamil	Maariye Kelamma	Master Venu	Thiruchi Loganathan & S. C. Krishnan
1956	Marma Veeran	Tamil	Pavazha Naattu Ellaiyile Mullai Aadudhu	Vedha	P. Susheela
1956	Marma Veeran	Tamil	O Aiyaa O Ammaa	Vedha	J. P. Chandrababu, S. C. Krishnan & Jikki
1956	Marumalarchi	Tamil	Therinjadhukkellaam	Pendyala Nageswara Rao	
1956	Maya Mohini	Tamil	Unnai Kanda Pothile	T. Chalapathi Rao	
1956	Melukolupu	Telugu	ThelisindandI Thelisindi	Pendyala Nageswara Rao	
1956	Nannambikkai	Tamil	Vaaraamal Irundhiduvaano	S. V. Venkatraman	S. V. Venkatraman
1956	Ondre Kulam	Tamil	Mangkilai Maele Poonguyil Kooviyadhu	S. V. Venkatraman & M. Ranga Rao	N. L. Ganasaraswathi, M. S. Rajeswari & Kalyani
1956	Ondre Kulam	Tamil	Sirippu Varaadho	S. V. Venkatraman & M. Ranga Rao	
1956	Paasavalai	Tamil	Aiyaiya Neenga Ambalaiyaanga	Viswanathan–Ramamoorthy	Thiruchi Loganathan
1956	Paditha Penn	Tamil	Vaadaadha Solai Malar Pootha Verlai	Arun & Raghavan	Thiruchi Loganathan
1956	Paditha Penn	Tamil	Gunamum Kula Dharma Gnaanamum	Arun & Raghavan	Thiruchi Loganathan
1956	Prema Pasam	Tamil		S. Rajeswara Rao	Jikki
1956	Santhosham	Telugu	Rupaai Kaasulone	Viswanathan–Ramamoorthy	
1957	Allauddin Adhbhuta Deepam	Telugu	Sogasari Dananayya Rangeli Singari	S. Rajeswara Rao & S. Hanumantha Rao	P. B. Sreenivas
1957	Allavudeenum Arputha Vilakkum	Tamil	Samayam Vachchuthaiyaa	S. Rajeswara Rao & S. Hanumantha Rao	K. R. Chellamuthu
1957	Achanum Makanum	Malayalam	Aamalarkkaavil	Vimal Kumar	A. M. Rajah
1957	Achanum Makanum	Malayalam	Njanoru Mulla	Vimal Kumar	
1957	Dhampatyam	Telugu	Ee Naati Amaayilu	Ramesh Naidu	P. B. Sreenivas
1957	Dongallo Dora	Telugu	Vanne Choodu Raajaa	M. Subrahmanyam Raju	
1957	Dongallo Dora	Telugu	Aadukundam Raave Jantaga	M. Subrahmanyam Raju	Swarnalatha
1957	Dongallo Dora	Telugu	Hoyalu Golupu	M. Subrahmanyam Raju	
1957	Engal Veettu Mahalakshmi	Tamil	Kaatthaadi Kaatthaadi	Master Venu	Ghantasala & P. Susheela
1957	Engal Veettu Mahalakshmi	Tamil	Pollaadha Payalai Serthida Maattom	Master Venu	P. Susheela
1957	Magathala Nattu Mary	Tamil	Jaya Jaya Jayame Peruvadhu Nijame	R. Parthasarathi	Soolamangalam Rajalakshmi
1957	Magathala Nattu Mary	Tamil	Kannum Kannum	R. Parthasarathi	S. V. Ponnusamy
1957	Maya Bajaar	Tamil	Dhayai Seiveerey	S. Rajeswara Rao & Ghantasala	Seerkazhi Govindarajan, S. C. Krishnan & G. Kasthoori
1957	Mayabazar	Telugu	Dayacheyandi	S. Rajeswara Rao & Ghantasala	Ghantasala, Pithapuram Nageswara Rao & P. Susheela
1957	Rathnagiri Rahasya	Kannada	O Raja O Maharaja	T. G. Lingappa	Udutha Sarojini
1957	Rathnagiri Rahasya	Kannada	Yavvanave Ee Yavvanave	T. G. Lingappa	A. P. Komala
1957	Rathnagiri Rahasya	Kannada	Kaattu Raajaa Aiyaa Kaattu Raajaa	T. G. Lingappa	A. G. Rathnamala
1957	Rathnagiri Rahasya	Kannada	Baa Baa Baa Odi Baa	T. G. Lingappa	P. Leela
1957	Rathnagiri Rahasya	Kannada	Aanandhaa Mahadhaanandhaa	T. G. Lingappa	Soolamangalam Rajalakshmi & Jikki
1957	Rathnagiri Rahasyam	Telugu	Yavvanave Ee Yavvanave	T. G. Lingappa & M. Subramanya Raju	Ramola
1957	Rathnagiri Rahasyam	Telugu	Naattu Raajaa Aiyyaa Ittu Raa	T. G. Lingappa & M. Subramanya Raju	Ramola
1957	Sati Anasuya	Telugu	Enthentha Dooram	Ghantasala	Madhavapeddi Satyam
1957	Sati Savitri	Telugu	Jo Jo Bangarubomma	S. V. Venkatraman	Udutha Sarojini
1957	Swayamprabha	Telugu	Ore Gunna Emo Anukunnaa	Ramesh Naidu	
1957	Swayamprabha	Telugu	Ole Soode Seli Itu Soodave	Ramesh Naidu	Pithapuram Nageswara Rao
1957	Thangamalai Ragasiyam	Tamil	Varavenum Varavenum	T. G. Lingappa	A. G. Rathnamala & A. P. Komala
1957	Thangamalai Ragasiyam	Tamil	Yauvvaname En Yauvvaname	T. G. Lingappa	A. P. Komala
1957	Thangamalai Ragasiyam	Tamil	Kaattu Raajaa Aiyaa Kaattu Raajaa	T. G. Lingappa	A. G. Rathnamala
1957	Thangamalai Ragasiyam	Tamil	Vaa Vaa Vaa Odi Vaa	T. G. Lingappa	P. Leela
1957	Thangamalai Ragasiyam	Tamil	Aanandham Pudhu Aanandham	T. G. Lingappa	Soolamangalam Rajalakshmi & Jikki
1957	Thangamalai Ragasiyam	Tamil	Thandhanatthaan Dhamukkaditthaan.... Veeradhi Veeran Sooraadhi Sooran	T. G. Lingappa	S. C. Krishnan
1957	Thodi Kodallu	Telugu	Gaalipatam Gaalipatam	Master Venu	Ghantasala & P. Susheela
1957	Thodi Kodallu	Telugu	Ententha Dhooram Kosedu Dhooram	Master Venu	P. Susheela
1957	Vadhante Pelli	Telugu	Ravo Ravo Priyathama	Rajan–Nagendra	
1957	Vadhante Pelli	Telugu	Moraalinchavamma Niraasa Cheyakamma	Rajan–Nagendra	
1957	Vinayaka Chaviti	Telugu	Vesenu Naa Madi Chindulu	Ghantasala	
1957	Vinayaka Chaviti	Telugu	Chinni Krishnamma Chesina	Ghantasala	P. Leela, K. Jamuna Rani, Ghantasala, Udutha Sarojini, P. S. Vaideghi & T. Sathyavathi
1958	Anna Thammudu	Telugu	Chinnari Chethula Chirugaali Mrothalaa	G. Aswatthama	P. B. Sreenivas
1958	Arasaala Pirandhavan	Tamil	Kaadhal Nilaave Ivvelai	Nallam Nageswara Rao	Ghantasala
1958	Arasaala Pirandhavan	Tamil	Azhagulla Pachai Kili Paar	Nallam Nageswara Rao	
1958	Boologa Rambai	Tamil	Vanna Mayil Vel Murugan	C. N. Pandurangan	A. G. Rathnamala
1958	Boologa Rambai	Tamil	Kodagu Malai Koottamungga	C. N. Pandurangan	Seerkazhi Govindarajan & S. V. Ponnusamy
1958	Boologa Rambai	Tamil	Aalai Paaru Solakollai Bommai	C. N. Pandurangan	Seerkazhi Govindarajan & S. V. Ponnusamy
1958	Booloka Rambha	Telugu	Loyalalo Mayakuni Koyakulam	C. N. Pandurangan	A. G. Rathnamala
1958	Booloka Rambha	Telugu	O Babu O Amma, Erragiri Vaasulam	C. N. Pandurangan	Madhavapeddi Satyam & Pithapuram Nageswara Rao
1958	Booloka Rambha	Telugu	Yelello Memu Eruka Cheppi	C. N. Pandurangan	Madhavapeddi Satyam & Pithapuram Nageswara Rao
1958	Booloka Rambha	Telugu	Dandakaavani Seethayu	C. N. Pandurangan	Madhavapeddi Satyam, Pithapuram Nageswara Rao & A. G. Rathnamala
1958	Engal Kudumbam Perisu	Tamil	Somasekara Loga Paalane	T. G. Lingappa	T. G. Lingappa & A. P. Komala
1958	Kaathavarayan	Tamil	Vetriye Arulamma	G. Ramanathan	A. P. Komala, K. Jamuna Rani & Sundaramma
1958	Kaathavarayan	Tamil	Kumkara Kuppanna	G. Ramanathan	S. C. Krishnan, A. G. Rathnamala, K. Jamuna Rani & Sundaramma
1958	Karthavarayuni Katha	Telugu	Konda Meeda Chandamama	G. Ramanathan & G. Aswathama	
1958	Karthavarayuni Katha	Telugu	Poosey Malli Remma	G. Ramanathan & G. Aswathama	A. P. Komala, Sundaramma & A. G. Rathnamala
1958	Kondaveeti Donga	Telugu	Thamalapaku Sunnamu	S. L. Merchant & M. S. Sriram	P. B. Sreenivas
1958	Kondaveeti Donga	Telugu	Iddariki Iddarayaa	S. L. Merchant & M. S. Sriram	P. B. Sreenivas
1958	Maalaiyitta Mangai	Tamil	Akkarai Cheemaikku Pona Macchaan	Viswanathan–Ramamoorthy	Seerkazhi Govindarajan
1958	Paanai Pidithaval Bhaagyasaali	Tamil	Ushaaru Ushaaru	S. V. Venkatraman & S. Rajeswara Rao	G. Kasthoori
1958	Sampoorna Ramayanam	Tamil	Ellorum Kondaadum Raamaraajyame	K. V. Mahadevan	A. P. Komala, A. G. Rathnamala & Udutha Sarojini
1958	Sampoorna Ramayanam	Tamil	Mannellaam Ponnaagum Raaman Varavaaley	K. V. Mahadevan	A. P. Komala, A. G. Rathnamala, S. C. Krishnan, Udutha Sarojini & M. S. Padma
1958	Sarangadhara	Tamil	Kannaal Nalla Paaru	G. Ramanathan	P. Bhanumathi & A. P. Komala
1958	School Master	Kannada	Swami Devane Loka Paalane	T. G. Lingappa	T. G. Lingappa & A. P. Komala
1958	School Master	Kannada	Bannirai Bannirai	T. G. Lingappa	A. P. Komala
1958	Sobha	Telugu	Ee Nela Reyi	A. M. Rajah	
1958	Sobha	Telugu	Oho Ee Sandhya Vela	A. M. Rajah	
1958	Sobha	Telugu	Yavvanamantha Navanavalade	A. M. Rajah	Jikki
1958	Sri Krishna Garadi	Telugu	Enni Chinnelunnavadu	Pendyala Nageswara Rao	
1958	Veera Khadgam	Telugu	Maimarapinche Chodhyamu	G. Ramanathan	Jikki & A. P. Komala
1959	Arumai Magal Abirami	Tamil	Joraana Kattalagu Ponne	V. Dakshinamoorthy	A. G. Rathnamala
1959	Arumai Magal Abirami	Tamil	Paaru Paaru Paaru Sirippaaru	V. Dakshinamoorthy	A. G. Rathnamala
1959	Azhagarmalai Kalvan	Tamil	Mai Ezhudhi Pottumittu	B. Gopalam	S. C. Krishnan
1959	Bala Nagamma	Tamil	Thaalo Thaalo Oonjale	T. V. Raju	P. Leela
1959	Bala Nagamma	Telugu	Yentho Yentho Vinthale	T. V. Raju	S. Janaki
1959	Daiva Balam	Telugu	Dum Dum Dummak	G. Aswathama	
1959	Daiva Balam	Telugu	Jeevithame Endtho Haayi	G. Aswathama	S. Janaki
1959	Daiva Balam	Telugu	Bangkamatti Naagaa Patinam Vaagaa	G. Aswathama	
1959	Daiva Balam	Telugu	Leneledha Raneradha	G. Aswathama	Udutha Sarojini
1959	Deiva Balam	Tamil	Kulla Nari Koottam Pole	G. Aswathama	
1959	Deiva Balam	Tamil	Varave Varaadha Magizhve Tharaadaha	G. Aswathama	S. Janaki
1959	Deiva Balam	Tamil	Vaa Vaa Kaali Vaaraai Maakaali	G. Aswathama	
1959	Gandhari Garvabangam	Telugu	Talagajala Naa Tanayula Baasi	Pamarthi & Sudhir Phadke	
1959	Jaya Vijaya	Tamilelugu	Aadaali Peddaali Pillaa Ninnu	Rajan–Nagendra	Nagendra
1959	Jaya Vijaya	Tamilelugu	Giligintalu Chkkiligiligintala	Rajan–Nagendra	P. B. Sreenivas & Nagendra
1959	Koothuru Kaapuram	Telugu	Yedi Monagaadedi	Ramesh Naidu	
1959	Koothuru Kaapuram	Telugu	Ohoho Naa Vayyari Mamayya	Ramesh Naidu	
1959	Mannan Magal	Tamil	Kannaala Unnai Korinen Naane	B. Gopalam	Jikki
1959	Manorama	Telugu	Gathi Leni Vanni Guddi Vanni	Ramesh Naidu	Talat Mahmood
1959	Manorama	Telugu	Ohoho Kaanthamma	Ramesh Naidu	P. B. Sreenivas
1959	Nala Damayanthi	Tamil	Thappi Pottu Thappu	B. Gopalam	B. Gopalam
1959	Pandithevan	Tamil	Kannum Karuthum	C. N. Pandurangan & Meenakshi Subramanyam	Radha Jayalakshmi & S. Janaki
1959	Pandithevan	Tamil	Sekku Poal Asaignchaadum	C. N. Pandurangan & Meenakshi Subramanyam	
1959	Pedda Kodalu	Telugu	Antha Levandi Enno Cheyandi	M. Ranga Rao	
1959	Pelli Sandadi	Telugu	Nallani Vade	Ghantasala	P. Leela
1959	Pudumai Penn	Tamil	Aambalai Koottam Aadura Aattam	T. G. Lingappa	K. Jamuna Rani
1959	Sabhash Ramudu	Telugu	Jabili Velungulo	Ghantasala	
1959	Sabhash Ramudu	Telugu	Jabilli Velungulo Kaalindhichentha	Ghantasala	
1959	Sati Tulasi	Telugu	Nanne Pendlada Vale Naa Sami	Pamarthi	P. Leela & P. S. Vaideghi
1959	Sipayi Koothuru	Telugu	Mokkajonna Thotalo	M. Subramanya Raju	Pithapuram Nageswara Rao
1959	Sipayi Koothuru	Telugu	O Lagajigi Lambadi	M. Subramanya Raju	Pithapuram Nageswara Rao
1959	Sipayi Koothuru	Telugu	O Chilaka Gootilone	M. Subramanya Raju	Madhavapeddi Satyam
1959	Sirimali	Sinhala	Prema Gange	V. Krishnamurthi	Christy Leonard Perera
1959	Sumangali	Tamil	Erindhaan Madhan Endru.... Pirakka Mukthi Irakka Mukthi	M. Ranga Rao	T. K. Ramachandran
1959	Sumangali	Tamil	Vegamaagave Poravale.... Manasum Manasum Onnu Serndhu	M. Ranga Rao	Seerkazhi Govindarajan
1960	Aalukkoru Veedu	Tamil	Pennille Nee Pennille	Viswanathan–Ramamoorthy	A. L. Raghavan
1960	Bhakta Raghunath	Telugu	Narahari Bhojana	Ghantasala	Madhavapeddi Satyam
1960	Chavukkadi Chandrakantha	Tamil	Mannaa Mayangaadhe Nee	G. Ramanathan	Soolamangalam Rajalakshmi
1960	Ellorum Innaattu Mannar	Tamil	Vetri Petra Maamanukku	T. G. Lingappa	P. Susheela
1960	Kanna Koothuru	Telugu	Emi Peru Pettudaam	M. Ranga Rao	A. P. Komala
1960	Jagannatakam	Telugu	Antha Inthera	G. Aswathama	Pithapuram Nageswara Rao
1960	Kotha Dari	Telugu	Kotha Daari Kotha Daari	C. N. Pandurangan & S. V. Ramanan	Radha Jayalakshmi & S. Janaki
1960	Kotha Dari	Telugu	Ratamalle Thirigadu	C. N. Pandurangan & S. V. Ramanan	
1960	Kuzhandhaigal Kanda Kudiyarasu	Tamil	Unnai Kandu Roja Chendu	T. G. Lingappa	Thiruchi Loganathan
1960	Mahakavi Kalidasu	Telugu	Nanu Choodu Naa	Pendyala Nageshwara Rao & P. Suri Babu	Madhavapeddi Satyam
1960	Mangaikku Maangalyame Pradhaanam	Tamil	Kaadhalil Inbathil Moozhgi	Jeevan	P. B. Sreenivas
1960	Mugguru Veerulu	Telugu	Ahaa Orachoopu Choosaavaame	T. R. Pappa	K. H. Reddy
1960	Naraanthakudu	Telugu	Nenī Divinelu Raanine	Pamarthi	Swarnalatha & Sunandha
1960	Pillalu Thechchina Rajyam	Telugu	Ninu Choochi Choochi Veedichipoduna	T. G. Lingappa	P. B. Sreenivas
1960	Ponnana Kudumbam	Tamil	Nillu Nillu Maadhe	P. Srinivasan	
1960	Ponnana Kudumbam	Tamil	Ohoho Inge vaanga Mappille	P. Srinivasan	
1960	Samajam	Telugu	Ninne Ninne Aye Aye	G. Aswathama	Pithapuram Nageswara Rao
1961	Batasari	Telugu		Master Venu	
1961	Kanna Koduku	Telugu	Ide Ide Hai Ide Tolirei	S. P. Kodandapani	A. M. Rajah
1961	Korada Veerudu	Telugu	Madhanaa Manasaayera	G. Ramanathan & J. Purushottam	Soolamangalam Rajalakshmi & Swarnalatha
1961	Madana Manjari	Telugu	Thelisene Ranga Rangeli	Pamarti & Mallik	P. B. Sreenivas
1961	Papala Bhairavudu	Telugu	Kannu Kannu Okataye	Pamarthi	K. Appa Rao
1961	Sati Sulochana	Telugu	Aadave Vayaari	T. V. Raju	P. B. Sreenivas
1961	Seetha	Telugu	Naduvammayi Taka Taka	M. Ranga Rao	K. Appa Rao
1961	Seetha	Telugu	Prajalevaro Rajunu Nenaithe	M. Ranga Rao	Jikki, J. V. Raghavulu & K. Appa Rao
1961	Usha Parinayam	Telugu	Ottesuko Ottesuko	S. Hanumantha Rao	Pithapuram Nageswara Rao
1961	Usha Parinayam	Telugu	Andhaalu Chindeti Ee Vanaseemalo	S. Hanumantha Rao	K. Jamuna Rani
1961	Yodhana Yodhulu	Telugu	Kanthivole Kalakalaga	G. Aswathama	P. S. Vaideghi
1961	Yodhana Yodhulu	Telugu	Tikku Tekkula Chitti Tekku	G. Aswathama	
1961	Yodhana Yodhulu	Telugu	Dolu Melamu Kottandaha	G. Aswathama	
1962	Ekaika Veerudu	Telugu	Evaro Evaro Iruvurilo	S. P. Kodandapani	L. R. Eswari
1962	Ekaika Veerudu	Telugu	Andaala Raani Maa Yuvaraani	S. P. Kodandapani	L. R. Eswari
1962	Gaali Gopura	Kannada	Neene Kiladi Hennu	T. G. Lingappa	Pithapuram Nageswara Rao
1962	Gaali Medalu	Telugu	Tea Shopuloni Pilla	T. G. Lingappa	Pithapuram Nageswara Rao
1962	Indira En Selvam	Tamil	Inbam Kondaadum Maalai	H. R. Padmanabha Sasthri & C. N. Pandurangan	P. B. Sreenivas
1962	Kalimilemulu	Telugu	Kommmalameeda	G. Aswathama	S. Janaki
1962	Khaḍgaveerudu	Telugu	Theeranidoka Sandeham	S. V. Venkatraman	K. Appa Rao
1962	Mohini Rukmangada	Telugu	Srilola Dinavana Mammele	Ghantasala	Ghantasala & Udutha Sarojini
1962	Nagarjuna	Telugu	Uyyaalalooge Naamad	Rajan–Nagendra	P. B. Sreenivas & S. Janaki
1962	Pathi Gowravame Sathikanandam	Telugu	Muripinchu Priyarani Mrudhuvaina Manjuvani	S. Rajeswara Rao	
1962	Pathi Gowravame Sathikanandam	Telugu	Vadharakumoyi Oye Vadharakumoyi	S. Rajeswara Rao	Pithapuram Nageswara Rao
1962	Pathi Gowravame Sathikanandam	Telugu	Sukham Sukham	S. Rajeswara Rao	
1962	Rathna Manjari	Kannada	Yaaru Yaaru Nee Yaaru	Rajan–Nagendra	Nagendra
1962	Siri Sampadalu	Telugu	Varaniki Okkate Sunday	Master Venu	P. B. Sreenivas, Pithapuram Nageswara Rao & S. Janaki
1962	Srisaila Mahatmyam	Telugu	Le Malle Rekhala	Pamarthi	
1962	Sthree Jeevitham	Telugu	Nelenante Natyamedhi	Pamarthi	Madhavapeddi Satyam & S. Janaki
1962	Veluthambi Dalawa	Malayalam	Innu Nalla Laakkaa	V. Dakshinamoorthy	K. P. Udayabhanu
1963	Anubandhalu	Telugu	Chinna Chinna Pillalamu	M. B. Sreenivasan	L. R. Eswari
1963	Kalayum Kaminiyum	Malayalam	Kaalathee Poomarachottil	M. B. Sreenivasan	K. J. Yesudas & L. R. Eswari
1963	Lakshadhikari	Telugu	Achammaku Nityamu Seemantamayene	T. Chalapathi Rao	Swarnalata & P. S. Vaideghi
1963	Lava Kusa	Kannada	Ashvamedha Yagaaikkeega Jayamu Jayamu Jayamu	Ghantasala	Ghantasala, Madhavapeddi Satyam, J. V. Raghavulu & P. S. Vaideghi
1963	Lava Kusa	Kannada	Jeya Jeya Raam.... Sree Raamaa Parandhaamaa	Ghantasala	J. V. Raghavulu, P. Leela, P. Susheela & P. S. Vaideghi
1963	Lava Kusa	Kannada	Raamaiya Raamanu Kodhanda Raamanu	Ghantasala	P. Susheela
1963	Lava Kusa	Kannada	Vallenolli Maavaa Neena Magalani	Ghantasala	Pithapuram Nageswara Rao, J. V. Raghavulu & Jikki
1963	Lava Kusa	Telugu	Ashvamedha Yagaaniki Jayamu Jayamu Jayamu	Ghantasala	Ghantasala, Madhavapeddi Satyam, J. V. Raghavulu & P. S. Vaideghi
1963	Lava Kusa	Telugu	Jeya Jeya Raam.... Sree Raamaa Parandhaamaa	Ghantasala	J. V. Raghavulu, P. Leela, P. Susheela & P. S. Vaideghi
1963	Lava Kusa	Telugu	Ramaiya Ramudu Kodanda Ramudu	Ghantasala	P. Susheela
1963	Lava Kusa	Telugu	Vollanori Maamaa Nee Pillani	Ghantasala	Ghantasala, J. V. Raghavulu & Jikki
1963	Lava Kusa	Tamil	Vetri Murasu Olikka Seiyyum Asvamedha Yaagaam	Ghantasala & K. V. Mahadevan	Ghantasala, Thiruchi Loganathan, Seerkazhi Govindarajan, J. V. Raghavulu & K. Jamuna Rani
1963	Lava Kusa	Tamil	Jeya Jeya Raam.... Sree Raamaa Parandhaamaa	Ghantasala & K. V. Mahadevan	J. V. Raghavulu, P. Leela, P. Susheela & K. Jamuna Rani
1963	Lava Kusa	Tamil	Raamane Raamane Kodhanda Raamane	Ghantasala & K. V. Mahadevan	P. Susheela
1963	Mamakaram	Telugu	Otu Veyandi... Kaakaalupattalemu	S. Rajeswara Rao	J. V. Raghavulu
1963	Naraanthakudu	Telugu	Neni Divinelu Raanine	Pamarthi	Swarnalatha & Sunanda
1963	Savati Koduku	Telugu	Emi Sogasu	C. Satyam	Madhavapeddi Satyam
1963	Somavara Vrata Mahatyam	Telugu	Chinnari Papayi Vardhilavamma	Master Venu	Soolamangalam Rajalakshmi
1963	Sri Tirupatamma Katha	Telugu	Po Pora Mamayah	Pamarthi	Madhavapeddi Satyam
1963	Thalli Biddalu	Telugu	Aadinchare Jola Ladinchare	B. Shankara Rao	
1963	Thalli Biddalu	Telugu	O Chinnadana	B. Shankara Rao	Madhavapeddi Satyam
1964	Addala Meda	Telugu	Cheliya Mukham	M. Ranga Rao	
1964	Vaarasatwam	Telugu	Neemeeda Manasayara	Ghantasala	
1964	Vazhi Piranthadu	Tamil	Muththip Pochu Idhukku	K. V. Mahadevan	
1964	Vazhi Piranthadu	Tamil	Vazhi Piranthadu, Nalla Vazhi Piranthadu	K. V. Mahadevan	
1964	Veera Senapati	Telugu	Ahaha Aagu Intha Tekka	V. Dakshinamoorthy & Parthasarathy	P. B. Sreenivas
1965	Vishala Hrudayalu	Telugu	Okka Maata	T. V. Raju	Madhavapeddi Satyam
1967	Dhanyame Dhanalakshmi	Telugu	Aangla Naagarika Ritulu	M. Ranga Rao	Udutha Sarojini
1967	Dhanyame Dhanalakshmi	Telugu	Aanandaseema Andaala Bhaama	M. Ranga Rao	
1967	Dhanyame Dhanalakshmi	Telugu	Hrdhayaalu Maarche Maikamu	M. Ranga Rao	
1968	Harichandra	Tamil	Aadum Mayile Venumaa	K. V. Mahadevan	Udutha Sarojini
1968	Sati Arundhati	Telugu	Poyirave Thalli	G. Aswathama	
1968	Sati Arundhati	Telugu	Agni Sakshiga Pendliyadina	G. Aswathama	T. R. Jayadev
1977	Vasthade Maa Bava	Telugu	Thinabothoo Ruchi Adagaku	Ghantasala Vijayakumar	Jikki
Unreleased	Santhippu	Tamil	Netru Andhi Neratthile		

== Tamil Islamic songs ==
Tamil Islamic songs with Nagore E. M. Hanifa:

1. "Odhuvom Vaarungal"
2. "Dheenore Niyayama"
3. "Vaazha Vaazha Nalla Vazhigal Undu"
4. "Arul Mevum Aandavare"

== DMK songs ==
Dravida Munnetra Kazhagam (DMK) songs with Hanifa:

1. "Azhaikkindraar Azhaikkindraar Annaa"
2. "Vaazhga Dhraavida Naadu"
3. "Annaa Vaazhgave ... Annai Mozhi Kaatthu Nirkkum"
