= R. Balasaraswathi Devi =

Indian singer and actress (1928–2025)

Raavu Balasaraswathi Devi
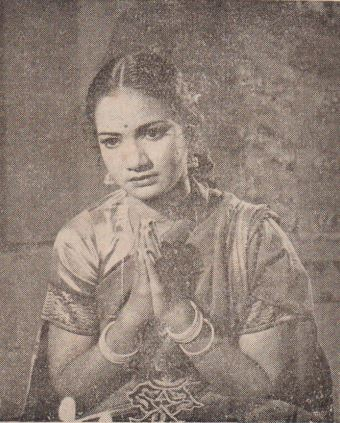
- Born: Raavu Balasaraswathi Devi; 28 August 1928; Venkatagiri, Madras Presidency, British India
- Died: 15 October 2025 (aged 97); Hyderabad, Telangana, India
- Occupations: Actress, playback singer
- Awards: Ramineni Foundation Award

Raavu Balasaraswathi Devi (28 August 1928 – 15 October 2025) was an Indian singer and actress who performed from 1930 to the 1960s in Telugu and Tamil cinema. She was the first light music singer on All India Radio and the first playback singer in the Telugu cinema.

== Early life ==
Balasaraswathi was born in 1928 to Parthasarathi Rao and Visalakshi Amma at Venkatagiri in Andhra Pradesh. She learned music from Allathuru Subbayya and lent her voice for the first solo gramophone by His Master's Voice at the age of six. In 1944 she married Raja Rao Pradyumna Krishna Mahipati Surya Rau, from the Rao Venkata Kumara Mahipati Surya Rau family. She was his second wife, and the couple had two sons, Gopalakrishna and Venkatakrishna. Balasaraswathi was the daughter of Vijaya Nirmala's paternal aunt.

== Career ==
Balasaraswathi Devi acted as child actor Ganga and also sang in the films Sati Anasuya and Bhakta Dhruva, both directed by C. Pullaiah in 1936. Observing her talent, director K. Subramaniam invited her to act in Tamil films. In the following years, she acted in Tamil films like Bhaktha Kuchela (1936), Balayogini (1937), and Thiruneelakantar (1939). She played the role of Tukaram's daughter in Tukaram (1938). The Tukaram role was portrayed by Musiri Subramania Iyer in the Tamil version and by C. S. R. Anjaneyulu in the Telugu version. In 1940, she acted with S. Rajeswara Rao in Illalu, directed by Gudavalli Ramabrahmam.

In Bhagya Lakshmi (1943) of Sri Renuka Films of V. Nagayya, she sang for Kamala Kotnis on screen, this being the first instance of playback singing in Telugu cinema. The song Thinne Meedha Sinnoda was composed by Bhimavarapu Narasimha Rao.

=== Music composers she sang for ===
Balasaraswathi Devi worked with G. Ramanathan, K. V. Mahadevan, C. R. Subburaman, S. V. Venkatraman, Viswanathan–Ramamoorthy, Bhimavarapu Narasimha Rao, R. Chinnaiah, S. Hanumantha Rao, S. Rajeswara Rao, P. Adinarayana Rao, G. Aswathama, Ogirala Ramachandra Rao, Balantrapu Rajanikanta Rao, Adepalli Rama Rao, C. N. Pandurangan, V. Nagayya, T. V. Raju, Ghantasala, Naushad, L. Malleswara Rao, S. Dakshinamurthi, Vedha, M. Ranga Rao, Master Venu, R. Sudarsanam, Pamarti Krishna Murty, G. Govindarajulu Naidu and M. B. Sreenivasan.

=== With playback singers ===
Balasaraswathi Devi sang duets mostly with Ghantasala and A. M. Rajah. She also sang with T. M. Soundararajan, T. A. Mothi, Seerkazhi Govindarajan, S. Rajam, M. S. Ramarao, Pithapuram Nageswara Rao and Subramanyam.

She also sang duets with Jikki, A. P. Komala, M. S. Rajeswari, K. Rani, P. Susheela and P. S. Vaideghi.

== Personal life and death ==
Balasaraswathi Devi lived for some years in Mysore, and then shifted to Hyderabad. After her husband's death, she lived with her son in her grandson's house in Secunderabad. Balasaraswathi Devi died at her residence in Hyderabad, on 15 October 2025, at the age of 97.

== Filmography ==
=== Playback singer ===
Year	Film	Language	Song	Music	Co-singer
1936	Sati Anasuya or Dhruva Vijayamu	Telugu	Yedi Daari Naa Kichata	Prabhala Satyanarayana	
1939	Mahananda	Telugu	Cheyandamma Cheyandi	Motibabu	
1939	Mahananda	Telugu	Kori Kori Vasinnche	Motibabu	
1939	Mahananda	Telugu	Jagame Jagame Jagamega	Motibabu	Lalitha & C. Krishnaveni
1939	Mahananda	Telugu	Therichoodu Ee Vanasobha	Motibabu	Lalitha & C. Krishnaveni
1939	Mahananda	Telugu	Marachipotivaa Maamaa	Motibabu	
1940	Illalu	Telugu	Suma Komala Kanulela Kala	S. Rajeswara Rao	S. Rajeswara Rao
1940	Illalu	Telugu	Kavyapaanamu Chesi Kaipekkinaane	S. Rajeswara Rao	S. Rajeswara Rao
1941	Apavadu	Telugu	Eemaanupainundi	S. Rajeswara Rao	K. Raghuramaiah
1941	Apavadu	Telugu	Adugadugo Poga Bandī	S. Rajeswara Rao	
1941	Apavadu	Telugu	Enni Chinnelu Nerchadammaa	S. Rajeswara Rao	
1941	Apavadu	Telugu	Thelisinademo Theliyanidemo	S. Rajeswara Rao	
1941	Apavadu	Telugu	Paanakammulo Pudaka Netikitu	S. Rajeswara Rao	
1941	Chandrahasa	Telugu	Javvaname Sresṭhamainadaho	Motibabu	
1941	Chandrahasa	Telugu	Sugandha Pushpa Sumambul	Motibabu	
1943	Bhagyalakshmi	Telugu	Tinne Meedi Chinnoda	Bhimavarapu Narasimha Rao	
1943	Bhagyalakshmi	Telugu	Chestanu Pendlikodukunu	Bhimavarapu Narasimha Rao	
1944	Chenchu Lakshmi	Telugu	Elukovayya Elukovayya	R. Chinnaiah & C. R. Subburaman	
1944	Chenchu Lakshmi	Telugu	Eri Eri Naa Samanulu	R. Chinnaiah & C. R. Subburaman	
1944	Chenchu Lakshmi	Telugu	Kanipinchitiva Narasimha	R. Chinnaiah & C. R. Subburaman	
1944	Chenchu Lakshmi	Telugu	Madhuramugaa Aahaa Ee Jeevithame	R. Chinnaiah & C. R. Subburaman	S. Venkatraman
1947	Radhika	Telugu	Gopala Krishnudu Nallana	S. Hanumantha Rao	
1948	Bilhana	Tamil	Sri Jaya Saraswathi Devi Thaaye	Papanasam Sivan	
1948	Bilhana	Tamil	Innisaiye Ganarasa Innamudhe Ennuriye	Papanasam Sivan	
1948	Suvarnamala	Telugu	Ravoji Jilvana Jyoti	Adepalli Rama Rao	
1948	Suvarnamala	Telugu	Gopala Baludu	Adepalli Rama Rao	
1948	Suvarnamala	Telugu	Gopala Radhalola	Adepalli Rama Rao	
1948	Suvarnamala	Telugu	Premaleelaye Noyi	Adepalli Rama Rao	Surya Narayana
1948	Suvarnamala	Telugu	Yadhakumara Giridhara	Adepalli Rama Rao	
1949	Laila Majnu	Tamil	Veen Pazhi Thane Prabho En Mel	C. R. Subburaman	
1949	Laila Majnu	Telugu	Ela Pagaye Ipudela Pagaye	C. R. Subburaman	
1950	Aahuti	Telugu	O Priyabalanura Ne Manajalanura	S. Rajeswara Rao	Ghantasala
1950	Aahuti	Telugu	Janana Maraṇa Lila Premaye	S. Rajeswara Rao	Ghantasala
1950	Aahuti	Telugu	Hansavale O Padava	S. Rajeswara Rao	Ghantasala & T. Kanakam
1950	Aahuti	Telugu	Premaye Janana Maraṇa Lila	S. Rajeswara Rao	Ghantasala
1950	Aahuti	Telugu	Punnami Vachinadī Ponginadī	S. Rajeswara Rao	Ghantasala
1950	Modati Rathri	Telugu	Mamatho Yemo Chandrudela	Pendyala Nageswara Rao	M. S. Ramarao & G. Varalakshmi
1950	Shavukaru	Telugu	Deepavali Deepavali (pathos)	Ghantasala	
1950	Shavukaru	Telugu	Deepavali Deepavali	Ghantasala	Santha Kumari
1950	Shavukaru	Telugu	Palukaraadate Chilukaa	Ghantasala	Ghantasala
1950	Shavukaru	Telugu	Palukaraadate Chilukaa	Ghantasala	
1950	Swapna Sundari	Tamil	Ohoho Maharaja	C. R. Subburaman	
1950	Swapna Sundari	Tamil	Nee Sariye Madhana	C. R. Subburaman	
1950	Swapna Sundari	Tamil	Nee Inbam Ulakinil Thaane	C. R. Subburaman	Ghantasala
1950	Swapna Sundari	Tamil	Komagane Nee Maha Thiyagiye	C. R. Subburaman	
1950	Swapna Sundari	Tamil	Thedi Alainthene Unnai	C. R. Subburaman	Ghantasala
1950	Swapna Sundari	Tamil	Pagattum Penne Yeno	C. R. Subburaman	
1950	Swapna Sundari	Telugu	Ohoho Maharaja	C. R. Subburaman	
1950	Swapna Sundari	Telugu	Natanalu Thelusune	C. R. Subburaman	
1950	Swapna Sundari	Telugu	Ee Seema Velasina	C. R. Subburaman	Ghantasala
1950	Swapna Sundari	Telugu	Oh Paradesi	C. R. Subburaman	
1950	Swapna Sundari	Telugu	O Swapna Sundari	C. R. Subburaman	Ghantasala
1950	Swapna Sundari	Telugu	Ninne Valache Konara	C. R. Subburaman	
1951	Mayakkari	Tamil	Kanbeno Kanbeno	P. Adinarayana Rao	Pithapuram Nageswara Rao
1951	Mayakkari	Tamil	Kaavinil Koovum Kogilam Thaano	P. Adinarayana Rao	Pithapuram Nageswara Rao
1951	Mayakkari	Tamil	Idhu Enna Vedhanai	P. Adinarayana Rao	
1951	Mayakkari	Tamil	Raajaa Koluvaai Vandhaar	P. Adinarayana Rao	Pithapuram Nageswara Rao
1951	Mayalamari	Telugu	Ledemo Ledemo	P. Adinarayana Rao	Pithapuram Nageswara Rao
1951	Mayalamari	Telugu	Koyila Koose	P. Adinarayana Rao	Pithapuram Nageswara Rao
1951	Mayalamari	Telugu	Valachina Priyude	P. Adinarayana Rao	
1951	Mayalamari	Telugu	Rani Vedaale	P. Adinarayana Rao	Pithapuram Nageswara Rao
1951	Mayalamari	Telugu	O Paradesi	P. Adinarayana Rao	
1952	Roopavathi	Telugu	Reethiye Leni Naa Vraatha	C. R. Subburaman	
1952	Roopavathi	Telugu	Vennelni Chinnabuchche Paata	C. R. Subburaman	
1952	Chinna Kodalu	Telugu	Jo Jo Jo Vayyarikade Jo Jo Jo	G. Aswathama	
1952	Chinna Kodalu	Telugu	Ra Rado Rachiluka	G. Aswathama	A. M. Rajah
1952	Chinna Kodalu	Telugu	Paruve Baruvaayega	G. Aswathama	
1952	Chinna Kodalu	Telugu	Pillanagrovi Patakada	G. Aswathama	
1952	Manavathi	Tamil	O Malaya Maarudhame	Balantrapu Rajanikanta Rao & H. R. Padmanabha Sastry	S. Rajam
1952	Manavathi	Tamil	Anbu Kondaendhum	Balantrapu Rajanikanta Rao & H. R. Padmanabha Sastry	
1952	Manavathi	Tamil	Thanadhu Adamae Thaan	Balantrapu Rajanikanta Rao & H. R. Padmanabha Sastry	
1952	Manavathi	Telugu	O Malaya Pavanama	Balantrapu Rajanikanta Rao & H. R. Padmanabha Sastry	M. S. Ramarao
1952	Manavathi	Telugu	Phalimpava Naa Asalu	Balantrapu Rajanikanta Rao & H. R. Padmanabha Sastry	
1952	Manavathi	Telugu	Tana Pantame	Balantrapu Rajanikanta Rao & H. R. Padmanabha Sastry	
1952	Kaadhal	Tamil		C. R. Subburaman	
1952	Prema	Telugu	Ooho! Idigada!	C. R. Subburaman	
1952	Priyuralu	Telugu	Anandam Mana Jeevana Ragam	S. Rajeswara Rao	Ghantasala & Jikki
1952	Priyuralu	Telugu	Undumu Madhuranagarilo Krishna	S. Rajeswara Rao	
1952	Priyuralu	Telugu	Evarida Venugīti Pillagalito	S. Rajeswara Rao	
1952	Priyuralu	Telugu	Okasaraina Nī Madhuralapana	S. Rajeswara Rao	Ghantasala
1952	Priyuralu	Telugu	Vinaravo O Vintalokama	S. Rajeswara Rao	Ghantasala
1952	Priyuralu	Telugu	Vennelni Chinnabuchche Paata	S. Rajeswara Rao	
1952	Santhi	Telugu	Aha Netiki Naapai Jaali	C. R. Subburaman	
1952	Santhi	Telugu	Voogudhune Ooyale	C. R. Subburaman	
1952	Thai Ullam	Tamil	Malai Nilaa Vara Vendum	V. Nagayya & Adepalli Rama Rao	T. A. Mothi
1953	Devadas	Tamil	Santhosham Vendumendral	C. R. Subburaman, T. K. Ramamoorthy & M. S. Viswanathan	
1953	Devadas	Tamil	Anbe Pavama	C. R. Subburaman, T. K. Ramamoorthy & M. S. Viswanathan	
1953	Devadas	Tamil	Paaramugam Yenayya En Swami	C. R. Subburaman, T. K. Ramamoorthy & M. S. Viswanathan	
1953	Devadasu	Telugu	Andam Choodavaya Anandinchavaya	C. R. Subburaman, T. K. Ramamoorthy & M. S. Viswanathan	
1953	Devadasu	Telugu	Tane Marena Nanne Marachena	C. R. Subburaman, T. K. Ramamoorthy & M. S. Viswanathan	
1953	Devadasu	Telugu	Imta Telisiyumdi	C. R. Subburaman, T. K. Ramamoorthy & M. S. Viswanathan	
1953	En Veedu	Tamil	Bhoomiyile Oru Punniya Kathai	V. Nagayya & Adepalli Rama Rao	Jikki
1953	Naa Chellelu	Telugu	Hayi Kada Mana Ilvanamu	C. N. Pandurangan	A. M. Rajah
1953	Naa Chellelu	Telugu	Ma Prema Ghada Madurmmugada	C. N. Pandurangan	A. M. Rajah
1953	Naa Illu	Telugu	Adigadigo Gagana Seemao	V. Nagayya & Adepalli Rama Rao	Jikki
1953	Naa Illu	Telugu	Vinnara Janulara Veenulara	V. Nagayya & Adepalli Rama Rao	Jikki
1953	Pichi Pullayya	Telugu	Ella Velalandu Nee Chakkani Chirunavvulakai	T. V. Raju	Ghantasala
1954	Nalla Penmani	Tamil	Anbe Nee Kanne Valarnthaal Petra	P. S. Divakar	
1954	Nalla Penmani	Tamil	Dhevi Dhevi Agathi En Vinai	P. S. Divakar	
1954	Nalla Penmani	Tamil	Nin Dhayavaale En Mana Thuyaram	P. S. Divakar	
1954	Nalla Penmani	Tamil	Anbe Nee Kanne Valarnthaal Petra	P. S. Divakar	A. M. Rajah
1954	Nalla Penmani	Tamil	Vaadi Ularumo Vaazhkai Malarumo	P. S. Divakar	
1954	Nirupedalu	Telugu	Raavamma Nidura Raavamma	T. V. Raju	
1954	Rajee En Kanmani	Tamil	Malligaipoo Jathi Roja	S. Hanumantha Rao	
1954	Rajee En Kanmani	Tamil	Sundara Malare	S. Hanumantha Rao	
1954	Rajee En Kanmani	Tamil	Amma Vareero	S. Hanumantha Rao	
1954	Rajee En Kanmani	Tamil	Thoongayo Duraiye Soppanam	S. Hanumantha Rao	
1954	Rajee En Kanmani	Tamil	Manadhinile Vethanai	S. Hanumantha Rao	
1954	Rajee Na Pranam	Telugu	Mallepoolu Mallepoolu	S. Hanumantha Rao	
1954	Rajee Na Pranam	Telugu	Meraina Choosi	S. Hanumantha Rao	
1954	Rajee Na Pranam	Telugu	Amma Ivigonamma Dayatho	S. Hanumantha Rao	
1954	Rajee Na Pranam	Telugu	Nindhu Vennela Mallelalo	S. Hanumantha Rao	
1954	Rajee Na Pranam	Telugu	Managalana Soonyamu	S. Hanumantha Rao	
1954	Panam Paduthum Padu	Tamil	Maname Sugame Perumo	T. A. Kalyanam	
1954	Panam Paduthum Padu	Tamil	Endrum Ilaa Inbam Idhe	T. A. Kalyanam	
1954	Vaddante Dabbu	Telugu	Mansaemo Chalinchaneyo	T. A. Kalyanam	
1954	Vaddante Dabbu	Telugu	Endhukohoyi Naku Endhukamma	T. A. Kalyanam	
1955	Aada Bidda	Telugu	Kalyani Subhadayini	Amarnath	
1955	Aada Bidda	Telugu	Galimedalena Naa Jīvitasalu	Amarnath	
1955	Aada Bidda	Telugu	Talatala Merise Vennelalo	Amarnath	
1955	Aada Bidda	Telugu	Laagaraa Ailesaa	Amarnath	M. S. Rama Rao & Pithapuram Nageswara Rao
1955	Asai Anna Arumai Thambi	Tamil	Kannaithaan Parikkudhu	K. V. Mahadevan	
1955	Asai Anna Arumai Thambi	Tamil	Sugam Peruveno	K. V. Mahadevan	
1955	Jaya Gopi	Tamil	O Muthu Papa	Viswanathan–Ramamoorthy	
1955	Jayasimha	Telugu	Madiloni Madhura Bhavam Palikenu Mohana Ragam	T. V. Raju	Ghantasala
1955	Jayasimha	Telugu	Manasaina Cheli Pilupu	T. V. Raju	A. P. Komala
1955	Jayasimman	Tamil	Malarodu Madhura Mevum Manam Kaanum Mohana Ragam	T. V. Raju	Ghantasala
1955	Jayasimman	Tamil	Malar Thara	T. V. Raju	A. P. Komala
1955	Mahakavi Kalidhas	Tamil	Pesum Kiliye Vaanil Parandhaai	C. Honnappa Bhagavathar	
1955	Mahakavi Kalidhas	Tamil	Vaaraai Vaaraai Vaaraai	C. Honnappa Bhagavathar	V. N. Sundaram
1955	Mangaiyar Thilakam	Tamil	Neela Vanna Kanna Vada	S. Dakshinamurthi	
1955	Nallakalam	Tamil	Vazhvu Malarnthu Manam Veesiduthe	K. V. Mahadevan	
1955	Nallakalam	Tamil	Maname Un Vaazhvil Nee	K. V. Mahadevan	
1955	Pasupu Kumkuma	Telugu	Hayi Hayi O Papayi	M. Ranga Rao	
1955	Sri Jagannatha Mahatyamu	Telugu	Kadha Yide Mrdumadhuramu	Mallik & B. Gopalam	
1955	Sri Jagannatha Mahatyamu	Telugu	Bhramara Yidemaya Ento	Mallik & B. Gopalam	
1956	Bhagyachakra	Kannada	Doora Doora Doorake	Vijaya Bhaskar	
1956	Bhagyachakra	Kannada	Jhalukina Jhalukina Loka	Vijaya Bhaskar	
1956	Bhagyodaya	Kannada	Anandha Gokula	L. Malleswara Rao	K. Rani & Subramanyam
1956	Bhagyodaya	Kannada	Namaste Saradha Devi.... Vaani Veena Paani	L. Malleswara Rao	
1956	Bhaktha Markandeya	Kannada	Dagudu Mootalu	Viswanathan–Ramamoorthy	
1956	Bhaktha Markandeya	Telugu	Dagudu Muthalu Natona	Viswanathan–Ramamoorthy	
1956	Kannin Manigal	Tamil	Kandu Konden Naane	S. V. Venkatraman	T. A. Mothi
1956	Kannin Manigal	Tamil	Kandu Konden Naane (pathos)	S. V. Venkatraman	T. A. Mothi
1956	Mangala Gauri	Tamil	Ambaa Mangala Gowri	Ogirala Ramachandra Rao	
1956	Marma Veeran	Tamil	Thudikkum Valibame	Vedha	
1956	Moondru Pengal	Tamil	Enadhu Ullame Poothu Kulungum	K. V. Mahadevan	
1956	Nalla Veedu	Tamil	Kalaimathiye En Kaadhal	Krishnamurthi & Nagaraja Iyer	P. B. Sreenivas
1956	Nalla Veedu	Tamil	Vidhiyin Sodhanai Idhuthaanaa	Krishnamurthi & Nagaraja Iyer	
1956	Nalla Veedu	Tamil	Idhayame Sorgamaagum	Krishnamurthi & Nagaraja Iyer	
1956	Sri Gauri Mahatyam	Telugu	Ambaa Mangala Gowri	Ogirala Ramachandra Rao & T. V. Raju	
1956	Tenali Raman	Tamil	Thangam Pongum Meni Undhan Sondham Ini	Viswanathan–Ramamoorthy	
1956	Tenali Ramakrishna	Telugu	Jhan Jhan Kankanamuluga	Viswanathan–Ramamoorthy	
1956	Vanaratham	Tamil	Sudar Thaari Sabaiyil Unai Kanen Nane	M. B. Sreenivasan	
1956	Vanaratham	Tamil	Nenjin Ilamai Ensolven	M. B. Sreenivasan	
1957	Aandi Petra Selvan	Tamil	Amma Amma	S. Rajeswara Rao	
1957	Aavathellam Pennale	Tamil	Vennila Raajaa Vegamaai Nee Vaa	Jeevan	
1957	Baagyavathi	Tamil	Ellorum Unnai Nallavan Endre	S. Dakshinamurthi	
1957	Baagyavathi	Tamil	Dhinasari En Vazhvil Thirunale	S. Dakshinamurthi	
1957	Bhaktha Markandeya	Tamil	Inggum Anggum	Viswanathan–Ramamoorthy	
1957	Dhampatyam	Telugu	Tanemi Talacheno	Ramesh Naidu	A. M. Rajah
1957	Dhampatyam	Telugu	Nadhi Veedhilo Jeevitham	Ramesh Naidu	
1957	Dhampatyam	Telugu	Ledhemo Aanandhaṁ Ipuḍi	Ramesh Naidu	
1957	Dhampatyam	Telugu	Vennelaajaa Vegame Raavaa	Ramesh Naidu	
1957	Evari Abbayi	Telugu	Kallamootakaalam Kadura Raajaa	T. M. Ibrahim	
1957	Mahadhevi	Tamil	Singara Punnagai Kannara Kandale	Viswanathan–Ramamoorthy	M. S. Rajeswari
1957	Peddarikalu	Telugu	Lali Lali Nanu Kannayya	Master Venu	
1957	Peddarikalu	Telugu	Vennela Radha Vedanalena	Master Venu	
1957	Peddarikalu	Telugu	Padavamma Maayam	Master Venu	P. Susheela & P. S. Vaidhegi
1957	Raja Rajan	Tamil	Kalaityaadha Aasai Kanave	K. V. Mahadevan	
1957	Raja Rajan	Tamil	Kalaityaadha Aasai Kanave (Pathos)	K. V. Mahadevan	
1957	Rani Rangamma	Telugu	Natiroju Yela Radhu	S. Dakshinamurthi	
1957	Sankalpam	Telugu	Nidurapoora	S. Dakshinamurthi	
1957	Sankalpam	Telugu	Naa Aasalanni	S. Dakshinamurthi	
1957	Veera Kankanam	Telugu	Amdala Rani	S. Dakshinamurthi	A. M. Rajah
1957	Veera Kankanam	Telugu	Siggulu Chigurinchene	S. Dakshinamurthi	
1957	Veera Kankanam	Telugu	Kalakaadhu Chelee Kaadhu	S. Dakshinamurthi	Jikki
1957	Yaar Paiyan	Tamil	Kannaamoochi Aattam	S. Dakshinamurthi	
1958	Anbu Enge	Tamil	Sollu Nee Raja	Vedha	
1958	Booloka Rambha	Telugu	Devi Dayaganave Bhavani	C. N. Pandurangan	
1958	Manchi Manasuku Manchi Rojulu	Telugu	Dharaniki Giri Bharama Giriki Taruvu Bharama	Ghantasala	
1958	Thai Pirandhal Vazhi Pirakkum	Tamil	Eliyorai Thaazhthi Valiyorai Vaazhthum	K. V. Mahadevan	T. M. Soundararajan
1958	Uthama Puthiran	Tamil	Muthe, Pavalame.... Aala Pirantha En Kanmaniye	G. Ramanathan	A. P. Komala
1959	Arumai Magal Abirami	Tamil	Nalla Pillai Endru Solli Unnai	V. Dakshinamoorthy	
1959	Bala Nagamma	Tamil	Aararo Ennaasai Raajaa	Pamarti	
1959	Gandhari Garva Bhangamu	Telugu	Ne Arunodayavela	Pamarti	
1959	Maa Inti Mahalakshmi	Telugu	Chivurullo Chilukalaga	G. Aswathama	P. S. Vaidhegi
1959	Mala Oru Mangala Vilakku	Tamil	Aaduthu Poongkodi	C. N. Pandurangan	
1959	Pedda Kodalu	Telugu	Vennelaradha Vedanelena	M. Ranga Rao	
1959	Pelli Sandadi	Telugu	Rave Premalata Oho Kaviraja	Ghantasala	Ghantasala
1959	Penn Kulathin Perumai	Tamil	Pillai Kaniyamuthe Pedhai Enthan	G. Ramanathan	
1959	Sahodhari	Tamil	Uravu Thanthai Kannaale	R. Sudarsanam	
1959	Sahodhari	Tamil	Malarum Malarum Nallarame	R. Sudarsanam	
1959	Sollu Thambi Sollu	Tamil	Soodaadha Malarai	K. V. Mahadevan	
1959	Sumangali	Tamil	Vidhi Seidha Sadhiyo Atthaan	M. Ranga Rao	Seerkazhi Govindarajan
1959	Thayapola Pillai Noolapola Selai	Tamil	Nalla Kudumbam Miga Nalla Kudumbam	K. V. Mahadevan	
1959	Thozhan	Tamil	Vada Malarthene	G. Ramanathan	
1959	Vachina Kodalu Nachindi	Telugu	Emo Emanukoneno Na Matha	S. Dakshinamurthi	
1960	Chinna Marumagal	Tamil	Namaste Saradha Devi.... Vaani Veena Paani	L. Malleswara Rao	
1960	Irumanam Kalanthal Thirumanam	Tamil	Kanne Vaadaa Kaniye Vaadaa	S. Dakshinamurthi	
1960	Raja Bakthi	Tamil	Paarmuzhuthum Irul Parappum	G. Govindarajulu Naidu	
1961	Thayilla Pillai	Tamil	Seerarum Paingkiliye	K. V. Mahadevan	
1962	Swargarajyam	Malayalam	Pandu Pandu Pande	M. B. Sreenivasan	
1963	Naan Vanangum Dheivam	Tamil	Dhayavillaiyo Annaiye	K. V. Mahadevan	
1968	Harichandra	Tamil	Oraam Maadham Udaladhu Thalarndhu	K. V. Mahadevan	
1968	Harichandra	Tamil	Naranaiyum Nee Padaitthaai	K. V. Mahadevan	
1980	Sangham Chekkina Shilpalu	Telugu	Poyi Rave Amma Poyi Ravamma	Ramesh Naidu	

=== Actress ===
Year	Film	Language	Director	Banner
1935	Sati Anasuya	Telugu	Ahin Chowdhary	
1936	Bhakta Dhruva	Telugu	C. Pullaiah	East India Film Company
1936	Bhaktha Kuchela	Tamil	K. Subramaniam	Madras United Artists Corp
1937	Balayogini	Tamil	K. Subramanyam	Madras United Artists Corp
1938	Tukaram	Tamil	B. Narayana Rao	Star Combines
1938	Tukaram	Telugu	B. Narayana Rao	Star Combines
1939	Thiruneelakantar	Tamil	P. K. Raja Sandow	Trichy Thyagaraj Films Ltd
1940	Illalu	Telugu	Gudavalli Ramabrahmam	Indira Devi Films
1941	Apavadu	Telugu	Gudavalli Ramabrahmam	Kasturi Films
1940	Chandrahasa	Telugu	M. L. Rangaiah	Vani Pictures
1943	Dhaasippen	Tamil	Ellis R. Dungan	Devi Films
1947	Radhika	Telugu	K. Sadasiva Rao	Sri Chatrapathi Pictures
1948	Bilhana	Tamil	B. N. Rao	Mubarak Pictures
1948	Bilhana	Telugu	B. N. Rao	Mubarak Pictures
