= Drohi =

Drohi (English: Traitor) has appeared as the title of several Indian films.

- Drohi (1948 film), a Telugu film by L. V. Prasad
- Drohi (1970 film), a 1970 Telugu film directed by K. Bapayya.
- Drohi (1982 film), a 1982 Malayalam film directed by P. Chandrakumar.
- Drohi (1992 film), a Hindi film by Ram Gopal Varma.
- Drohi (1996 film), a Telugu film by P. C. Sreeram.
- Drohi (2010 film), a Tamil film by Sudha Kongara.
