= Apavadu =

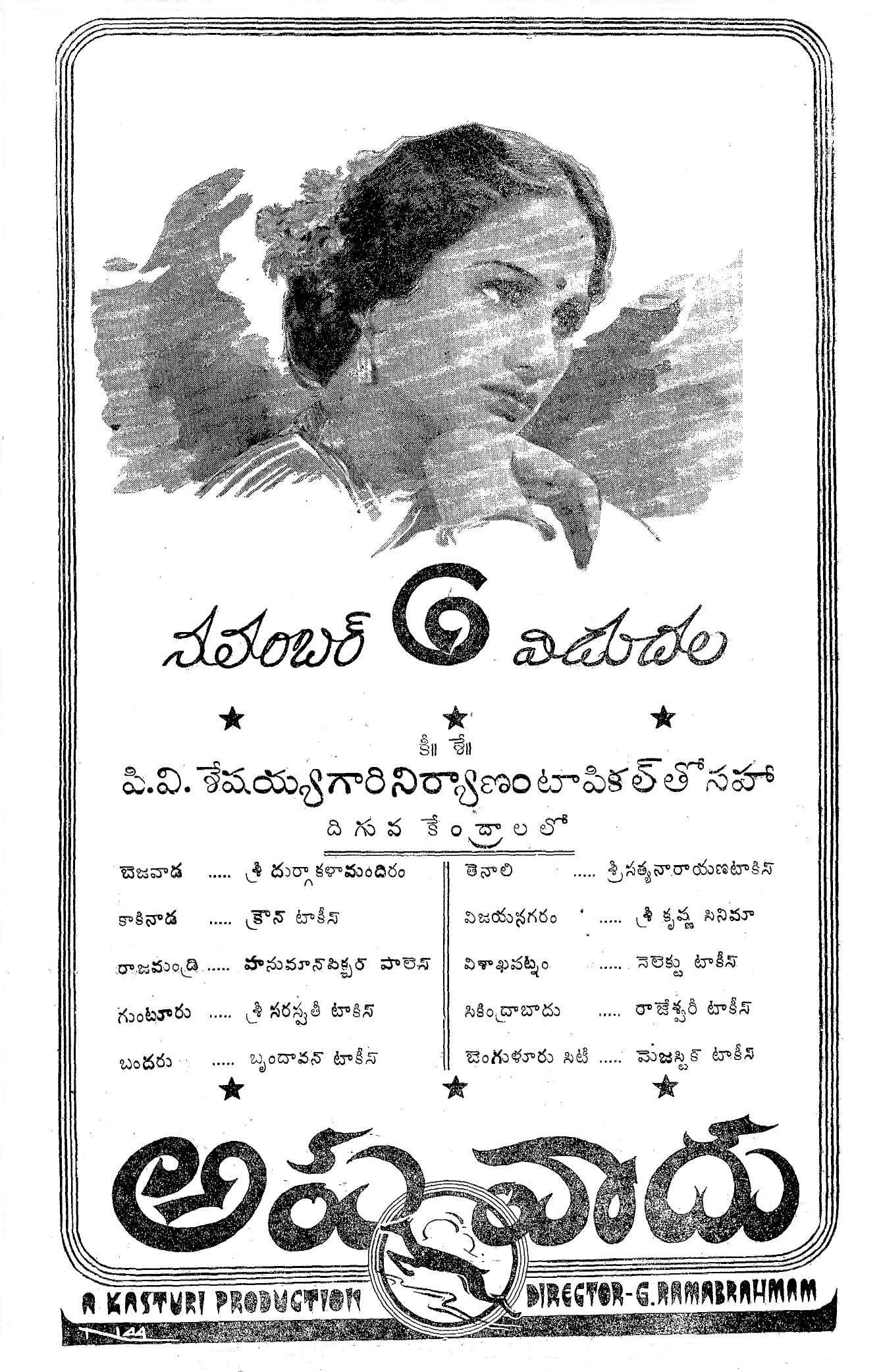
- Apavadhu_(1941)_Release_Date_Poster
- Directed by: Gudavalli Ramabrahmam
- Produced by: Kasturi Films
- Starring: Kalyanam Raghuramaiah; K. S. Prakash Rao; C. Lakshmi Rajyam; R. Balasaraswathi Devi; S. Varalakshmi
- Music by: BNR (Bheemavarapu Narasimha Rao)
- Production company: Kasturi Films
- Distributed by: Kasturi Films
- Release date: 1941
- Country: India
- Language: Telugu

Apavadu (transl. Scandal) is a 1941 Telugu drama film directed by Gudavalli Ramabrahmam.

== Plot ==
Prakash is a revenue inspector who leads a happy life with his wife Kamala, sister Kantham and son Kittu. Venkaiah and his wife Anasuya are their neighbours. Prakash has a friend Kamaraju. Anasuya has a crush on Kamaraju. When he refuses her advances, Anasuya is enraged and plots revenge with the help of a local rowdy, Mangapathi. They spread rumours about an amorous relationship between Kamala and Kamaraju. When Kamala hears the rumours she attempts suicide. Kamaraju, with the help of Rathnam, finds out that the handwriting on the love letter supposedly written by him is similar to Anasuya's. The truth prevails and Prakash and Kamala live happily ever after.

== Cast ==
- Kalyanam Raghuramaiah – Kamaraju, friend of Prakash
- K. S. Prakash Rao – Prakash
- C. Lakshmi Rajyam – Kamala, wife of Prakash
- R. Balasaraswathi – Kantham, sister of Prakash
- Balamani – Rathnam
- Aveti Poornima – Anasuya, wife of Venkaiah
- S. Varalakshmi – Bobjee
- M. C. Raghavan – Venkaiah
- Maddali Krishna Murthy
- Seshagiri – Mangapathi
- Master Prabhakar – Kittu, son of Prakash

== Soundtrack ==
This film has 15 songs written by Basavaraju Apparao, Tapi Dharmarao and Kosaraju Raghavaiah.

- "Deva Devudow Na Nathunaku"
- "Ee Mavipai Nundi Eevu"
- "Raavalante Throve Leda"
