= G. Varalakshmi =

Indian actress

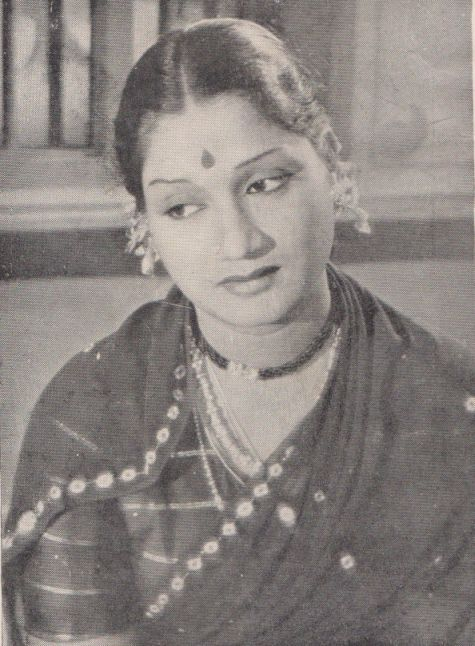
- Varalakshmi in c. 1951
- Born: Garikapati Varalakshmi; 27 September 1926; Ongole, Madras Presidency, British India (now in Andhra Pradesh, India)
- Died: 26 November 2006 (aged 80); Chennai, Tamil Nadu, India
- Occupation: Actress
- Spouse: K. S. Prakash Rao (m. 1943)
- Children: K. Raghavendra Rao (step-son)
- Relatives: K. Bapayya (nephew); Prakash Kovelamudi (step-grandson)

Garikapati Varalakshmi (27 September 1926 – 26 November 2006) was an Indian actress, stage artist, singer, and director who worked in Telugu and Tamil films.

== Early life and career ==
Varalakshmi was born in 1926 in Ongole, Andhra Pradesh, India. Her father was a pehelwan. She started acting on stage in Vijayawada when she was 11 years old. She acted along with stage actors Thungala Chalapathi and Dasari Kotiratnam and became popular for her roles in plays like Sakkubai and Rangoon Rowdy.

Her first two movie roles aged 14 were in Barrister Parvatheesam, produced by Raghupathy Prakash, and Bondam Pelli, produced by H. M. Reddy. These two were released together as a two-in-one movie. She then moved to Bombay to sing in the chorus for Naushad in 1942. As her career as a singer was not successful, she returned to Madras in 1946. She married the filmmaker and studio-owner K. S. Prakash Rao. Her husband and she acted in and produced a controversial and popular movie, Drohi in which she played the part of an arrogant daughter.

Drohi was followed by popular movies like Kula Gotralu, Kanna Talli and Pelli Chesi Choodu in which she acted with all the top heroes of Indian films of the 1940s and 1950s in Telugu and Tamil, playing roles ranging from a loving woman and arrogant sister to a mother-in-law. She also directed a social movie, Moogajeevulu. She got involved in politics and supported M.G.R for a short time and was an active member of Andhra Pradesh Praja Natya Mandali.

== Personal life ==
She was the mother of two children, one daughter Kovelamudi Kanaka Durga and a son Kovelamudi Siva Prakash who became a famous cameraman. She is also the step-mother of the famous director Kovelamudi Raghavendra Rao. Her granddaughter Manasa acted in the film Nandanavanam 120km.

== Filmography ==
Note: The list is not comprehensive.

=== Actress ===
Year	Film	Language	Character
1940	Barrister Parvateesam	Telugu	
1940	Bondam Pelli	Telugu	
1941	Dakshayagnam	Telugu	
1942	Bhakta Prahlada	Telugu	
1946	Vanarani	Telugu	
1948	Vindhyarani	Telugu	
1948	Drohi	Telugu	Saroja
1950	Maaya Rambha	Tamil	Rambha
1950	Maaya Rambha	Telugu	Rambha
1950	Modati Rathri	Telugu	
1950	Lakshmamma	Tamil	
1950	Sri Lakshmamma Katha	Telugu	Pichamma
1950	Swapna Sundari	Tamil	Rani
1950	Swapna Sundari	Telugu	Rani
1951	Anni	Tamil	
1951	Deeksha	Telugu	
1951	Niraparadhi	Tamil	Tara
1951	Nirdoshi	Telugu	Tara
1952	Manavathi	Tamil	
1952	Manavathi	Telugu	
1952	Kalyanam Panni Paar	Tamil	
1952	Pelli Chesi Choodu	Telugu	Ammadu
1953	Naa Chellelu	Telugu	
1953	Kanna Talli	Telugu	Shanta
1953	Petra Thai	Tamil	Santa
1953	Prapancham	Telugu	
1953	Paropakaram	Tamil	
1953	Paropakaram	Telugu	
1954	Jyoti	Telugu	
1954	Kudumbam	Tamil	Seetha
1954	Menarikam	Telugu	Seetha
1954	Maa Gopi	Telugu	
1954	Palle Paduchu	Telugu	
1955	Ante Kavali	Telugu	
1955	Gulebakavali	Tamil	Queen Bakavali
1955	Jaya Gopi	Tamil	
1955	Pasupu Kunkuma	Telugu	
1956	Balasanyasamma Katha	Telugu	
1956	Marumalarchi	Tamil	
1956	Melukolupu	Telugu	
1956	Naan Petra Selvam	Tamil	Gowri
1956	Paasavalai	Tamil	
1956	Vazhvile Oru Naal	Tamil	Janaki/Kaladevi
1957	Dhampathyam	Telugu	
1957	Dongallo Dora	Telugu	Kamini
1957	Pakka Thirudan	Tamil	Kamini
1957	Aravalli	Tamil	Queen Aravalli
1957	Karpurakarasi	Tamil	Chandrika
1957	Uthama Illalu	Telugu	Chandrika
1957	Pathini Deivam	Tamil	Sivagami
1958	Dongalunnaru Jagratha	Telugu	
1958	Kudumba Penn	Telugu	Pichamma
1958	Mangalya Balam	Telugu	Seeta
1958	Manjal Mahimai	Tamil	Seeta
1958	Raja Nandini	Telugu	Vimala
1958	Sampoorna Ramayanam	Tamil	Kaikeyi
1958	Thirudargal Jakkirathai	Tamil	
1959	Mamiyar Mechina Marumagal	Tamil	Seeta
1960	Renukadevi Mahatyam	Telugu	
1960	Sivagami	Tamil	Sivagami
1961	Bikari Ramadu	Telugu	
1961	Iddaru Mitrulu	Telugu	
1961	Nagarjuna	Kannada	Uluchi
1962	Bhishma	Telugu	
1962	Kalimi Lemulu	Telugu	Manikyamba
1962	Kula Gothralu	Telugu	
1962	Padandi Munduku	Telugu	
1962	Nagarjuna	Telugu	
1963	Anuragam	Telugu	
1965	Aavadhellaam Pennaale	Tamil	
1965	Antastulu	Telugu	Roopa Devi
1965	Sumangali	Telugu	
1965	Kuzhandaiyum Deivamum	Tamil	Alamelu
1965	Paditha Manaivi	Tamil	
1965	Veera Abhimanyu	Tamil	Draupadi
1965	Veerabhimanyu	Telugu	Draupadi
1966	Aata Bommalu	Telugu	
1966	Aastiparulu	Telugu	Rajyalakshmi
1966	Letha Manasulu	Telugu	Kanaka Durgamma
1967	Pattathu Rani	Tamil	
1967	Rahasyam	Telugu	Chandramma
1968	Amayakudu	Telugu	
1968	Harichandra	Tamil	
1968	Bangaru Sankelu	Telugu	
1968	Mooga Jeevulu	Telugu	
1968	Veeranjaneya	Telugu	Mandodari
1969	Jagath Kiladeelu	Telugu	
1971	Mooga Prema	Telugu	
1971	Pavitra Bandham	Telugu	Durgamma
1971	Anuradha	Telugu	Rukmini
1971	Veettukoru Pillai	Tamil	
1972	Vazhaiyadi Vazhai	Tamil	
1973	Doctor Babu	Telugu	Parvathi
1973	Samsaram Sagaram	Telugu	
1973	Veettukku Vandha Marumagal	Tamil	
1974	Chakravakam	Telugu	
1974	Premalu Pellillu	Telugu	
1974	Tulasi	Telugu	
1974	Vani Rani	Tamil	
1975	Babu	Telugu	
1975	Kathanayakuni Katha	Telugu	Pulatla Tayaramma
1975	Rajyanlo Rabandulu	Telugu	
1975	Vayasochina Pilla	Telugu	
1976	Athavarillu	Telugu	
1976	Ee Kalapu Pillalu	Telugu	
1976	Mahatmudu	Telugu	Parvathamma
1976	Manchiki Maro Peru	Telugu	
1976	Sri Rajeswari Vilas Coffee Club	Telugu	
1977	Unnai Suttrum Ulagam	Tamil	
1978	Gorantha Deepam	Telugu	
1978	Nindu Manishi	Telugu	
1980	Kiladi Krishnudu	Telugu	
1980	Sirimalle Navvindi	Telugu	
1986	Sirivennela	Telugu	

=== Director ===
1. Moogajeevulu (1968)

== Discography ==
Year	Film	Language	Song	Co-singers	Music director
1940	Barrister Parvateesam	Telugu	Premaye Jagathi Demudu		Kopparapu Subba Rao
1940	Barrister Parvateesam	Telugu	Poyira Priyuda London Poyira		Kopparapu Subba Rao
1948	Drohi	Telugu	Nede Theere Naa Vaancha		Pendyala Nageswara Rao
1948	Drohi	Telugu	Premaye Kaadha Sadha Vilaasi	M. S. Rama Rao	Pendyala Nageswara Rao
1948	Drohi	Telugu	Chakkaligintalu Leva Leva		Pendyala Nageswara Rao
1948	Drohi	Telugu	Poovu Cheri Palumaaru	Ghantasala	Pendyala Nageswara Rao
1948	Drohi	Telugu	Nee Tetalenide Chitraniki Geetu		Pendyala Nageswara Rao
1948	Drohi	Telugu	Trinamo Panamo Veyyandi	Pithapuram Nageswara Rao	Pendyala Nageswara Rao
1948	Drohi	Telugu	Padandira Padandira Padandira	Pithapuram Nageswara Rao	Pendyala Nageswara Rao
1948	Drohi	Telugu	Manovanchalu Eenaati Koolipoye		Pendyala Nageswara Rao
1948	Drohi	Telugu	Cakkaru Kottuku Vachava	Kasturi Siva Rao	Pendyala Nageswara Rao
1948	Drohi	Telugu	Sari Sari Matala Mootha		Pendyala Nageswara Rao
1950	Maaya Rambha	Tamil			Ogirala Ramachandra Rao
1950	Maaya Rambha	Telugu	Ragamutho Nanu Kanuma		Ogirala Ramachandra Rao
1950	Maaya Rambha	Telugu	Veera Rasikulu Kalarasikulu		Ogirala Ramachandra Rao
1950	Modhati Rathri	Telugu	Cheliya Ee Sumamu Ye Rangu		Pendyala Nageswara Rao
1950	Modhati Rathri	Telugu	Taguna Pagaboona Penchina		Pendyala Nageswara Rao
1950	Modhati Rathri	Telugu	Mamatho Yemo Chandrudela	M. S. Rama Rao & R. Balasaraswathi Devi	Pendyala Nageswara Rao
1950	Modhati Rathri	Telugu	Oyi Naa Raja Oyyaree Raja		Pendyala Nageswara Rao
1950	Modhati Rathri	Telugu	Sannagaa Tinnagaa Raraa	Kasturi Siva Rao	Pendyala Nageswara Rao
1950	Modhati Rathri	Telugu	Oho Bava Oyi Bava	Madhavapeddi Satyam	Pendyala Nageswara Rao
1950	Modhati Rathri	Telugu	Eduru Ledika Naakeduru Ledika		Pendyala Nageswara Rao
1950	Modhati Rathri	Telugu	Aasalu Baasi Naa Aasalu Baasi		Pendyala Nageswara Rao
1950	Modhati Rathri	Telugu	Manasidemo Ooyalalooge	M. S. Rama Rao & Kasturi Siva Rao	Pendyala Nageswara Rao
1950	Swapna Sundari	Tamil	Sagasam Therinthathaiya Un		C. R. Subburaman & Ghantasala
1950	Swapna Sundari	Tamil	Ullam Magizhnthu Ennaiye		C. R. Subburaman & Ghantasala
1950	Swapna Sundari	Tamil	Maranthatheno Manathu		C. R. Subburaman & Ghantasala
1950	Swapna Sundari	Telugu	Nee Sari Neevele		C. R. Subburaman & Ghantasala
1950	Swapna Sundari	Telugu	Ullam Magizhnthu Ennaiye		C. R. Subburaman & Ghantasala
1950	Swapna Sundari	Telugu	Marali Ravo Manasu Ledo		C. R. Subburaman & Ghantasala
1950	Vaali Sugreeva	Telugu	Ahaha Mohana Prema Pooje		S. Rajeswara Rao, Pendyala Nageswara Rao, Master Venu, Galipenchala Narasimha Rao & Ghantasala
1950	Vaali Sugreeva	Telugu	Naa Aashaajyothiye Aaripovunaa		S. Rajeswara Rao, Pendyala Nageswara Rao, Master Venu, Galipenchala Narasimha Rao & Ghantasala
1950	Vaali Sugreeva	Telugu	Priyatama Naa Hrdaya Mandara		S. Rajeswara Rao, Pendyala Nageswara Rao, Master Venu, Galipenchala Narasimha Rao & Ghantasala
1951	Anni	Tamil	Pon Vilaindhathu Jai Enboam	Pithapuram Nageswara Rao	Pendyala Nageswara Rao
1951	Anni	Tamil	Enna Aambule Nee Enna Aambule	Pithapuram Nageswara Rao	Pendyala Nageswara Rao
1951	Anni	Tamil	Pongalo Pongal Pongi Varudhamma	Pithapuram Nageswara Rao	Pendyala Nageswara Rao
1951	Anni	Tamil	Ennamma Ennamma Kanne	Pithapuram Nageswara Rao	Pendyala Nageswara Rao
1951	Anni	Tamil	Kanne Paapaa Kaniye Paapaa		Pendyala Nageswara Rao
1951	Anni	Tamil	Rama Harae Jaya Rama Harae		Pendyala Nageswara Rao
1951	Anni	Tamil	Anbu Kanindhaal Poodevi		Pendyala Nageswara Rao
1951	Dheeksha	Telugu	Pasidi Pantaku Jai Anara	Pithapuram Nageswara Rao	Pendyala Nageswara Rao
1951	Dheeksha	Telugu	Chalnathalli Bhudevi	Pithapuram Nageswara Rao	Pendyala Nageswara Rao
1951	Dheeksha	Telugu		Pithapuram Nageswara Rao	Pendyala Nageswara Rao
1951	Dheeksha	Telugu		Pithapuram Nageswara Rao	Pendyala Nageswara Rao
1951	Dheeksha	Telugu	Chinninanna Chittinanna		Pendyala Nageswara Rao
1951	Dheeksha	Telugu	Sri Ramasitaramakapadarava		Pendyala Nageswara Rao
1951	Dheeksha	Telugu	Ammagari Illu Dharmalogillu		Pendyala Nageswara Rao
1951	Niraparadhi	Tamil	Sarasa Sangeethamadhe		H. R. Padmanabha Sastry & Ghantasala
1951	Niraparadhi	Tamil	Naane Raaniye		H. R. Padmanabha Sastry & Ghantasala
1951	Nirdoshi	Telugu	Nene Janaga Nerajanaga		H. R. Padmanabha Sastry & Ghantasala
1951	Nirdoshi	Telugu	Sakha Naa Raju		H. R. Padmanabha Sastry & Ghantasala
1952	Manavathi	Telugu	Melukolipega Thane Melukolipega		H. R. Padmanabha Sastry & Balantrapu Rajanikanta Rao
1952	Manavathi	Telugu	Rao Elaravo Etannunavo		H. R. Padmanabha Sastry & Balantrapu Rajanikanta Rao
1952	Manavathi	Telugu	O Na Sakhi Pona Sakhi		H. R. Padmanabha Sastry & Balantrapu Rajanikanta Rao
1953	Pelli Chesi Choodu	Telugu	Raadhanuraayedavaku	Ghantasala, Joga Rao & P. Leela	Ghantasala
1953	Kanna Talli	Telugu	Sirikin Cheppadu Shangkacahkra		Pendyala Nageshwara Rao
1953	Manjari	Telugu	Paripalayam Janani Karunamayi Bhavani		H. R. Padmanabha Sastry
1953	Rohini	Tamil			G. Ramanathan, K. V. Mahadevan & D. C. Dutt
1953	Rohini	Telugu	Bratuke Shidhilamai Poye		G. Ramanathan, K. V. Mahadevan & D. C. Dutt
1954	Jyothi	Telugu	Chitti Potti Papallara		Pendyala Nageswara Rao
1954	Jyothi	Telugu	Deshmunu Premichumanna		Pendyala Nageswara Rao
1955	Ante Kaavali	Telugu	O Vedalipoye Premika		Pendyala Nageswara Rao
1955	Ante Kaavali	Telugu	Nijamena Nijamena Nee		Pendyala Nageswara Rao
1955	Ante Kaavali	Telugu	Raoyi Itu Raoyi	M. S. Rama Rao	Pendyala Nageswara Rao
