= M. S. Ramarao =

Moparthi Seetha Rama Rao
- Born: 3 July 1921; Moparru, Tenali, Andhra Pradesh
- Died: 20 April 1992 (aged 70) Hyderabad, Andhra pradesh, India
- Genres: Playback singing, Devotional
- Occupations: Singer, composer
- Website: msramaraomemorialtrust.org/bookcds.htm

M. S. Rama Rao (3 July 1921 – 20 April 1992) was an Indian singer and composer. He was the very first playback singer in the Telugu filmdom and popular for his devotional songs.

== Singing career ==
Rama Rao debuted at World Telugu Conference held in Hyderabad in 1975.

He became popular for his Telugu version of Hanuman Chalisa. He also narrated Bala kanda, Ayodhya kanda and Sundara Kanda (some parts of the epic Ramayana) in form of Songs in Telugu. He gained fame for singing the devotional songs and was awarded the name of 'Sundara Dasu' in 1977.

He wrote Hanuman Chalisa and Sundarakandamu of Valmiki Ramayana in Telugu during 1972–74. He sang Sundarakanda in the form of Telugu songs.

=== Tollywood ===
His movie singing career spanned 1944–64 in Madras.

He also sang "Ee vishala prashantha ekanta soudhamlo" for O. P. Nayyar's Telugu movie Neerajanam.

== Personal life ==
Rama Rao married Lakshmi Samrajyam in 1946 and had three children P.V. Sarojini Devi, M. Babu Rao and M. Nageshwar Rao. He was inspired to write Hanuman Chalisa because of his elder son Babu Rao who was a pilot in the Indian Air force whose whereabouts were not known for a long time during the Indo-Pak war in 1971, so he dedicated himself to lord Hanuman for his safe return and composed and sang the Hanuman chalisa in Telugu. His only lineage to carry his surname is capt Moparti Anil Rao (grandson) and then his son Moparti Aman Rao (great-grandson). All of them being three generations of pilots. M.S.Rama Rao's second grandson is taking forward his legacy by continuing to perform his songs.

== Awards ==
Rama Rao gained fame for his singing the above two works and was awarded the name of 'Sundara Dasu' in 1977.

Rao's inspirational songs still provide incentives to follow the path of singing, even a decade after his unfortunate death.

== Songs ==
- Sundarakandamu
- Hanuman Chalisa
- Bala Kandamu

== Filmography ==
Year	Film	Language	Song	Music director	Co-singer
1941	Devata	Telugu	Ee Vasanthamu Nityamu Kadoyi	V. Nagayya	
1948	Drohi	Telugu	Idenaa Nee Nyayamu	Pendyala Nageswara Rao	
1949	Mana Desam	Telugu	Emito Ee Sambhandam	Ghantasala	C. Krishnaveni
1949	Mana Desam	Telugu	Chalo Chalo Raja	Ghantasala	C. Krishnaveni
1950	Jeevitham	Telugu	Idena Maa Desam	R. Sudharsanam	
1950	Shavukaru	Telugu		Ghantasala	
1950	Modati Rathri	Telugu		Ghantasala	
1951	Anni	Tamil	Poadaa Kanne Poayi Nee Paaradaa	Pendyala Nageswara Rao	
1951	Deeksha	Telugu		Pendyala Nageswara Rao	
1951	Niraparadhi	Tamil	Vidhiyaale Vanameha Seedhai	Ghantasala	
1951	Nirdoshi	Telugu		Ghantasala	
1952	Manavathi	Telugu	O Malaya Pavanama	Balantrapu Rajanikanta Rao & H. R. Padmanabha Sastry	R. Balasaraswathi Devi
1952	Palletooru	Telugu	Aa Manasulona	Ghantasala	
1953	Naa Illu	Telugu		V. Nagayya & A. Rama Rao	
1953	Pichi Pullayya	Telugu	Avamanaalaku Baliavuthunna	T. V. Raju	
1953	Pichi Pullayya	Telugu	Sokapu Tupaanu	T. V. Raju	
1954	Annadata	Telugu		P. Adinarayana Rao	
1954	Kudumbam	Tamil		Pendyala Nageswara Rao	
1954	Menarikam	Telugu		Pendyala Nageswara Rao	
1949	Nirupedalu	Telugu	Ammalaraa Vinnaraa	T. V. Raju	
1949	Nirupedalu	Telugu	Eethele Ee Brathukintele	T. V. Raju	
1949	Nirupedalu	Telugu	Eethele Ee Nirupedala	T. V. Raju	
1955	Jayasimha	Telugu	Jeevitamintele	T. V. Raju	
1957	Panduranga Mahatyam	Telugu	Oh Daari Kaanan	T. V. Raju	
1957	Manaalane Mangaiyin Baakkiyam	Tamil	Mogamadaa Thaalaadha Modamadaa	P. Adinarayana Rao	P. Leela
1957	Manaalane Mangaiyin Baakkiyam	Tamil	Kanee Nee Vaadaa Kaniye Nee	P. Adinarayana Rao	P. Susheela
1957	Sarangadhara	Telugu	Dhanalubdula Vruddula	Ghantasala	
1957	Sati Anasuya	Telugu	Kadilindi Ganga Bhavani	Ghantasala	Ghantasala
1957	Suvarna Sundari	Telugu	Naa Chitti Papa	P. Adinarayana Rao	P. Susheela
1957	Vinayaka Chaviti	Telugu	Raja Premajoopara	Ghantasala	P. Leela
1957	Vinayaka Chaviti	Telugu	Yashoda Kishora	Ghantasala	
1958	Karthavarayuni Katha	Telugu	Okka Kshnam	G. Ramanathan & G. Aswathama	
1958	Raja Nandini	Telugu		T. V. Raju	
1960	Seeta Rama Kalyanam	Telugu	Sashtiryojana	Gali Penchala Narasimha Rao	
1960	Seeta Rama Kalyanam	Telugu	Padmaasane	Gali Penchala Narasimha Rao	
1960	Seeta Rama Kalyanam	Telugu	Kowsalyaa Suprajaa	Gali Penchala Narasimha Rao	
1960	Seeta Rama Kalyanam	Telugu	Sree Raaghavam	Gali Penchala Narasimha Rao	
1960	Seeta Rama Kalyanam	Telugu	Hey Raama Raama	Gali Penchala Narasimha Rao	
1960	Seeta Rama Kalyanam	Telugu	Mangalam	Gali Penchala Narasimha Rao	
1975	Sri Ramanjaneya Yuddham	Telugu	Saranamu Neeve Srirama	K. V. Mahadevan	
1975	Sri Ramanjaneya Yuddham	Telugu	Amaraadhe	K. V. Mahadevan	
1988	Neerajanam	Telugu	ee visala prasantha	O. P. Nayyar	
