= Maa Gopi =

- Film Poster
- Directed by: B. S. Ranga
- Screenplay by: Kovvali Lakshmi Narasimha Rao
- Based on: Bhagyawan
- Starring: V. Nagayya, G. Varalakshmi, Vallam Narasimha Rao, Jamuna
- Cinematography: B. S. Ranga
- Music by: Viswanathan–Ramamoorthy
- Production company: Vikram Productions
- Release date: 24 September 1954
- Country: India
- Language: Telugu

Maa Gopi is a 1954 Telugu language film directed by B. S. Ranga. The film stars V. Nagayya, G. Varalakshmi, Vallam Narasimha Rao, Jamuna.

The film was dubbed into Tamil as Jaya Gopi and released in 1955. The film was a remake of 1953 Hindi film Bhagyawan and its Marathi version Soubhagya. Ranga also planned to dub it into Kannada and engaged his friend and popular writer Chi. Sadasivaiah to pen the dialogue. But for some reason he gave up the idea. In 1981, Sadasivaiah's lyricist-son Chi. Udayashankar suggested to Kannada matinee idol Rajkumar to remake Maa Gopi. Ranga himself directed the Kannada version, titled Bhagyavantha introducing Rajkumar's youngest son Master Lohit Puneeth Rajkumar in the title role. This too was a big hit.

== Cast ==
The list was adapted from The Hindu article

- V. Nagayya
- G. Varalakshmi
- Vallam Narasimha Rao
- Jamuna
- Relangi
- Master Venkateswarlu
- Cherukumalli Raju
- K. V. Subbarao
- Baby Anuradha
- Master Krishnamurthy

== Soundtrack ==
Music was composed by the duo Viswanathan–Ramamoorthy.

=== Telugu songs ===
Lyrics were penned by Anisetty Subbarao.

Song No.	Song	Singer/s	Duration (m:ss)
1	"O Muddu Papa… Naa Muddu Gopi"	R. Balasaraswathi Devi	
2	"Desadesamula Yasam Ganchumaa"	T. Sathiyavathi	
3	"Ledayyo Mukti Ledayyo"	Pithapuram Nageswara Rao	
3	"Maa Vadina Maa Vadina"	Jikki & K. Rani	
3	"Jali Jaliga Eḍakavayya"	Madhavapeddi Satyam	
3	"Yuvatī Yuvakula Manamanta"		

=== Tamil songs ===
Lyrics were penned by Ka. Mu. Sheriff & Kannadasan (The song book information says the dance song was penned by Ka. Mu. Sheriff while all other songs were penned by Kannadasan). Playback singers are P. Leela, Jikki, R. Balasaraswathi Devi, A. P. Komala, S. C. Krishnan & B. Nageswara Rao.

Song No.	Song	Singer/s	Lyrics	Duration (m:ss)
1	"O Mutthu Papa Vaa Mutthu Gopi"	R. Balasaraswathi Devi	Kannadasan	
2	"Dhesa Dhesamundan"		Kannadasan	
3	"Oonjalil Oyyaara Ullaasam"	Jikki	Kannadasan	03:17
4	"Karunai Ullame"	V. Nagayya	Kannadasan	03:09
5	"Sirunagai Valar"	Jikki	Kannadasan	
6	"Poorva Jenman Cheidha"		Kannadasan	
7	"Amma Kaaveri Un"		Kannadasan	
8	"Mana Magizhndhen"	Jikki, AP. Komala	Kannadasan	03:21
9	"Paazhum Moodargal"		Kannadasan	
10	"Veliye Poyittu"		Ka. Mu. Sheriff	

== Reception ==
The film was a success at the box office.
