= Karthavarayuni Katha =

- Theatrical release poster
- Directed by: T. R. Ramanna
- Story by: Maddhipatla Suri
- Produced by: T. R. Ramanna
- Starring: N. T. Rama Rao; Savitri
- Cinematography: T. K. Rajabathar
- Edited by: M. S. Mani; D. Durairajan
- Music by: G. Ramanathan; Ashwathama
- Production company: R. R. Pictures
- Release date: 18 October 1958
- Running time: 124 minutes
- Country: India
- Language: Telugu

Karthavarayuni Katha (transl. Story of Karthavaraya) is a 1958 Indian Telugu-language Hindu mythological film, produced and directed by T. R. Ramanna under the R. R. Pictures banner. It stars N. T. Rama Rao, Savitri with music composed by G. Ramanadhan and Ashwathama. The film was simultaneously made as the Tamil movie Kathavarayan (1958) by the same banner and director.

== Cast ==
- N. T. Rama Rao as Karthavaraya
- Savitri as Aryamala
- Rajanala as Tribal King
- Ramana Reddy as Chinnappa
- Mukkamala as King of Arya
- Padmanabham as Chief Commander
- K. V. S. Sarma
- Balakrishna
- Kannamba as Goddess Parvati / Kamakshi
- Girija
- Surabi Balasaraswathi as Aaravalli
- E. V. Saroja as Mohini

== Soundtrack ==
Karthavarayuni Katha

Film score by G. Ramanadhan Ashwathama
- Released: 1958
- Genre: Soundtrack
- Producers: G. Ramanadhan; Ashwathama

Music composed by G. Ramanadhan & Ashwathama. Music released by Audio Company.

S. No.	Song title	Music	Lyrics	Singers	length
1	"Namasthe Namasthe"	Ashwathama	Malladi Ramakrishna Sastry	Madhavapeddi Satyam, Satyavathi	3:05
2	"Poosey Malli Remma"	G. Ramanadhan	Devulapalli	A. P. Komala, K. Rani, Sundaramma, Ratnamala,	2:15
3	"Meesala Rosayyo"	G. Ramanadhan	Devulapalli	Madhavapeddi Satyam, Ratnamala	6:17
4	"Kaluva Rekula"	G. Ramanadhan	Devulapalli	Ghantasala, P. Leela, Pithapuram, A. P. Komala	4:33
5	"Sangili Giligili"	G. Ramanadhan	Devulapalli	Ghantasala, T. G. Kamala Devi Madhavapeddi Satyam	3:32
6	"Naa Manasemone"	G. Ramanadhan	Devulapalli	P. Leela	
7	"Okkasari Choodava"	Ashwathama	Devulapalli	P. B. Srinivas	5:35
8	"Kaavali Kaavali"	Ashwathama	Devulapalli	P. B. Srinivas	
9	"Konda Meeda Chandamama"	Ashwathama	Devulapalli	K. Rani	0:57
10	"Okkasari Digiraava"	G. Ramanadhan	Devulapalli	Ghantasala	
11	"Mooge Chikati"	Ashwathama	Devulapalli	P. Leela	4:01
12	"Ananda Mohana"	Ashwathama	Malladi Ramakrishna Sastry	P. B. Srinivas	2:25
13	"Gaajulamma Gaajulu"	Ashwathama	Devulapalli	S. Janaki	
14	"Okka Kshnam"	Ashwathama	Devulapalli	M. S. Rama Rao	3:09
