= Thirudargal Jakkirathai =

- Theatrical release poster
- Directed by: B. Narasimha Rao
- Screenplay by: (Dialogues) B. S. Rangasamy
- Story by: Aatreya
- Produced by: G. Krishnamoorthi
- Starring: S. S. Rajendran; G. Varalakshmi
- Cinematography: N. Prakash
- Music by: K. V. Mahadevan
- Production company: Prathiba Pictures
- Distributed by: Bell Pictures
- Release date: 11 July 1958
- Country: India
- Languages: Tamil; Telugu

Thirudargal Jakkirathai (transl. Beware of Thieves) is a 1958 Indian Tamil-language film directed by B. Narasimha Rao. The film stars S. S. Rajendran and G. Varalakshmi. It was simultaneously produced in Telugu with the title Dongalunnaru Jagratha. The film was released on 11 July 1958.

== Cast ==
List adapted from the database of Film News Anandan

Male cast

- S. S. Rajendran
- T. S. Balaiah
- V. K. Ramasamy
- T. K. Ramachandran
- Duraisamy

Female cast

- G. Varalakshmi
- Girija

Telugu version

- C. S. R. Anjaneyulu
- Jaggayya

== Production ==
The film was produced by G. Krishnamoorthi and directed by B. Narasimha Rao. This film was simultaneously produced in Telugu with the title Dongalunnaru Jagratha with a different cast.

== Soundtrack ==
Music was composed by K. V. Mahadevan.

Song	Singer/s	Lyricist
"Azhage Unnai Kandom"	P. B. Srinivas & S. Janaki	Kannadasan
"Nallavar Pola Veli Vesham"	Kasthuri & M. S. Rajeswari	A. Maruthakasi
"Amma Ivar Summaa"	Jikki	Thanjai N. Ramaiah Dass
"Kannirandum Kavi Paadum"	Jikki	Thanjai N. Ramaiah Dass
"Maarumaa Manam Yemaarumaa"	Jikki	Thanjai N. Ramaiah Dass
"Poiyaa Naina Poiyaa"	S. C. Krishnan	Thanjai N. Ramaiah Dass
"Kaaviyam Neeye Karpanai Naane"	Ghantasala & Jikki	Thanjai N. Ramaiah Dass
"Jakkammaa Devi Sokkammaa"	A. G. Rathnamala	Thanjai N. Ramaiah Dass
