= Kanna Talli =

1953 Indian drama film

- Theatrical release poster
- Directed by: K. S. Prakash Rao
- Written by: Sunkara Satyanarayana; Vasireddy; Sri Sri; Arudra
- Produced by: K. S. Prakash Rao
- Starring: Akkineni Nageswara Rao; G. Varalakshmi
- Cinematography: Jagirdar
- Edited by: A.V.S.Subba Rao
- Music by: Pendyala
- Production company: Prakash Studios
- Distributed by: Navayuga Pictures
- Release date: 16 April 1953
- Running time: 193 minutes (Telugu); 194 minutes (Tamil)
- Country: India
- Languages: Telugu; Tamil

Kanna Talli (transl. Own Mother) is a 1953 Indian Telugu-language drama film produced and directed by K. S. Prakash Rao. It stars Akkineni Nageswara Rao and G. Varalakshmi, with music composed by Pendyala. It marks the debut of the playback singer P. Susheela and actress Rajasulochana in the film industry. It was simultaneously shot in Tamil as Petra Thai, with dialogues written by S. A. Subbaraman.

== Cast ==
Male cast

- Akkineni Nageshwara Rao as Ramu
- R. Nageswara Rao as Chalapathi
- M. N. Nambiar as Shankar
- Peketi Sivaram as Sharma
- Mikkilineni as Ramu's maternal uncle
- Pendyala Nageswara Rao as Perumallu
- Babji as Nagaiah
- Koduru Achaiah Chowdary as Naiduamma
- Pasumarti as Dancer

Female cast

- G. Varalakshmi as Shanta
- Rajasulochana as Dancer
- T. D. Vasantha as Gowri
- Annapurna as Kanthamma
- Shanta as Chanchala
- C. Varalakshmi as Lakshmi

== Soundtrack ==
The music was composed by Pendyala.

Telugu songs

Song title	Lyrics	Singers	length
"Sri Rama Ramanudunu" (Burrakatha)	Sri Sri, Arudra	Ghantasala	5:38
"Swatantra Bhanudu"	Sunkara Satyanarayana, Vasireddy	Udutha Sarojini	3:22
"Saaramuleni Samsaram"	Sri Sri, Arudra	Madhavapeddi Satyam	2:09
"Choostarenduku Raarandi"	Tapi Dharma Rao	Ghantasala	3:37
"Yenduku Pilichevu"	Sri Sri, Arudra	A. M. Rajah, P.Susheela	2:57
"Enta Manchidanavoyamma"	Sri Sri, Arudra	Ghantasala	3:09
"Choochava Choochava"	Acharya Aatreya	Udutha Sarojini	3:01
"Nuvvu Kaavali"	Tapi Dharma Rao	Ghantasala, P. Susheela	2:46
"Ede Ede Vilaasam"	Sri Sri, Arudra	A. M. Rajah, K. Rani	3:01

Tamil Songs

The lyrics were written by M. S. Subramaniam. The song Yaedukku Azhaithai is the first Tamil film song sung by P. Susheela.

Song	Singer/s	Duration (m:ss)
"Penmani Nalla Kanmani"	N. Lalitha & group	
"Swathanthra Aadhavan Udhithaane"	Udutha Sarojini	
"Vaarungaiyaa Nalla Porulidhu"	Udutha Sarojini	
"Saaram Illaadha Samsaaram Thanile"	Madhavapeddi Satyam & group	
"Yaedhukku Azhathaai Yaedhukku"	A. M. Rajah & P. Susheela	03:26
"Maamayil Pol Aadi"	K. Rani	
"Paarthaayaa Parivudane"	Ghantasala	
"Nilaavile Oyyaaram"	A. M. Rajah & K. Rani	02:54
"Enna Nalla Thaai Neeyamma"	Ghantasala	
