= Mantra Dandam =

- Theatrical release poster
- Directed by: K. S. Ramachandra Rao
- Written by: Tapi Dharma Rao (dialogues)
- Screenplay by: K. S. Ramachandra Rao
- Story by: C. Hemalata Devi
- Produced by: C. K. C. Chitti
- Starring: Akkineni Nageswara Rao; Sriranjani Jr.
- Cinematography: Bolla Suba Rao
- Edited by: M. V. Rajan
- Music by: Nallam Nageswara Rao; S. Rajeswara Rao (Background score)
- Production company: Sri Gnanambika Pictures
- Release date: 6 October 1951
- Country: India
- Language: Telugu

Mantra Dandam (transl. Magical Wand) is a 1951 Telugu-language fantasy swashbuckler film, produced by C. K. C. Chitti under the Sri Gnanambika Pictures banner and directed by K. S. Ramachandra Rao. It stars Akkineni Nageswara Rao, Sriranjani Jr. and music composed by Nallam Nageswara Rao, while S. Rajeswara Rao has taken care of the background score.

The film was dubbed into Tamil with the title Arasaala Piranthavan and released in 1958.

== Cast ==
- Akkineni Nageswara Rao as Siva Prasad
- Sriranjani Jr. as Gowri
- C.S.R as Maharaju
- Kasturi Siva Rao as Shankara Sarma
- Ram Murthy as Sambaiah
- Linga Murthy as Tintakarala, a wizard
- Aadiseshaiah as Mahamantri
- Ganapathi Bhattu as Rajagaru
- Suryanarayana as Kothvalu
- Kanchi Narasimham as Maavati
- Krishna Kumari as Bhavani
- Surabhi Balasaraswathi as Girija
- B. Jayamma as Yogini
- C. Hemalata Devi as Chinna Rani
- K. Jayalakshmi as Pedda Rani
- C. Varalakshmi as Durga
- Radio Bhanumathi as Gowri's mother
- Kantha Devi as Dancer

== Soundtrack ==
Seeta Rama Jananam

Film score by Nallam Nageswara Rao
- Released: 1951
- Genre: Soundtrack
- Producer: Nallam Nageswara Rao

Music composed by Nallam Nageswara Rao. Lyrics were written by Tapi Dharma Rao. Music released on Audio Company.

S. No.	Song title	Singers	length
1	"Gowrimaata"		
2	"Ravvikidanda Veemukidanda"		
3	"Kaalusethulunanta Matrame"		
4	"Gaali Edela Eevela"		
5	"Nanne Rajuni Chesavante"		
6	"Yenta Bharnthi"		
7	"Kanugonava Priyasakha"		
8	"Repekada Maa Pandaga"		
9	"Talapulu Parugidava Hai"		
10	"Vaddusuma"		
11	"Amba Jagadamba"		
12	"Meenatha Kuthurani Nenu"		
13	"Priya Nipaina Mohanburaa"		
