= Bhagyodaya =

1956 Kannada film

- Directed by: P. V. Babu
- Produced by: N. Bhakta Vatsalan; A. C. Narasimha Murthy
- Starring: Sowkar Janaki, T. R. Narasimha Raju
- Cinematography: C. A. Madhusudhan
- Music by: L. Malleswara Rao
- Production company: Udaya Productions
- Release date: 1956
- Country: India
- Language: Kannada

Bhagyodaya ( transl. Rise of Fortune) is a 1956 Indian Kannada-language film directed by P. V. Babu. The film stars Sowkar Janaki and T. R. Narasimha Raju. It is notable as the 61st talkie movie produced in the Kannada industry since its inception in 1934. The film also marks de debut of actor Udaykumar.

== Cast ==
- Sowkar Janaki
- T. R. Narasimha Raju
- Udaykumar
- Pandari Bai

== Production ==
The film was produced by N. Bhakta Vatsalan and A. C. Narasimha Murthy under the banner Udaya Productions, with cinematography by C. A. Madhusudhan.

It was later dubbed unto Tamil under the title Chinna Marumagal and released in 1960. The Tamil version was produced by K. Ramanathan and edited by K. Ganesan.

== Soundtrack ==
The music for the film was composed by L. Malleswara Rao, with lyrics penned by K. Prabhakar Sastri. The sound featured Playback singers R. Balasaraswathi Devi, K. Rani, Subrahmaniyam and Madhavapeddi Satyam.
