= Raja Nandini =

- Theatrical release poster
- Directed by: Vedantam Raghavayya
- Written by: Malladi Ramakrishna Sastry (story / dialogues)
- Screenplay by: Vedantam Raghavayya
- Produced by: M. Ramakrishna Rao; Midde Jagannatha Rao
- Starring: N. T. Rama Rao; Anjali Devi
- Cinematography: M. A. Rehman; C. Nageswara Rao
- Edited by: N. S. Prakasam
- Music by: T. V. Raju
- Production company: Jalaruha Productions
- Release date: 4 July 1958
- Running time: 140 minutes
- Country: India
- Language: Telugu

Raja Nandini is a 1958 Telugu-language film, produced by M. Ramakrishna Rao and Midde Jagannatha Rao under the Jalaruha Productions banner and directed by Vedantam Raghavayya. It stars N. T. Rama Rao, and Anjali Devi with music composed by T. V. Raju.

== Cast ==
- N. T. Rama Rao as Jaya Chandra
- Anjali Devi as Ramani
- Rajanala as Tirumala Nayaka
- Gummadi as Ramaraju
- Relangi as Gajapathi
- R. Nageswara Rao as Kireeti
- Mahankali Venkaiah as Bhupathi
- K. V. S. Sharma as Raja Guruvu Sadananda Swamy
- G. Varalakshmi as Vimala
- Krishna Kumari as Menaka
- Girija as Sridevi
- Hemalatha as Maharani Sumitra Devi

== Soundtrack ==
Raja Nandini

Film score by T. V. Raju
- Released: 1958
- Genre: Soundtrack
- Producer: T. V. Raju

Music was composed by T. V. Raju. Lyrics were written by Malladi Ramakrishna Sastry. Playback singers are A. M. Rajah, M. S. Rama Rao, Pithapuram Nageswara Rao, Jikki and P. Susheela.

Music released by Audio Company.

| S. No. | Song title | Singers | length |
|---|---|---|---|
| 1 | "Hara Hara Purahara" | M. S. Rama Rao | 02:48 |
| 2 | "Chikkavulera Chakkani Raja" | Jikki | 03:15 |
| 3 | "Nee Meda Manasayeraa" | P. Susheela | 03:35 |
| 4 | "Sreegirilinga Sivagurulinga" | Pithapuram Nageswara Rao | 03:47 |
| 5 | "Kadha Naaku Telusoyi" | P. Susheela | 03:18 |
| 6 | "Komma Meeda Koyila" | Jikki | 02:51 |
| 7 | "Rangeli Routante" | P. Susheela | 02:55 |
| 8 | "Ninne Ninne" | Jikki | 02:15 |
| 9 | "Andalu Chindu Seema" | A. M. Rajah & Jikki | 03:16 |
| 10 | "Nitaina Chinnavoda" | Jikki | |
| 11 | "Chenguna Egire" | Jikki | 04:32 |
| 12 | "Yeduko Cheppalenu" | Pithapuram Nageswara Rao | |
| 13 | "Jalaroopa Mrudupaani" | | |
