= Anni (1951 film) =

- Theatrical release poster
- Directed by: K. S. Prakash Rao
- Screenplay by: M. S. Subramaniam
- Story by: Tapi Dharma Rao
- Produced by: K. S. Prakash Rao
- Starring: Master Sethu; G. Varalakshmi; Annapoorna; K. Sivaram
- Cinematography: B. S. Ranga
- Music by: Pendyala
- Production company: Prakash Productions
- Distributed by: National Pictures
- Release date: 5 September 1951
- Running time: 180 minutes
- Country: India
- Languages: Tamil; Telugu

Anni (transl. Sister-in-law) is a 1951 Indian Tamil-language drama film directed by K. S. Prakash Rao. The film stars Master Sethu and G. Varalakshmi. It was released on 5 September 1951.

== Cast ==
List adapted from the database of Film News Anandan.

Male cast

- Master Sethu
- Master Sudhakar
- K. Sivaram
- Sundar Rao

Female cast

- G. Varalakshmi
- Annapoorna
- Kamala
- Saroja

== Production ==
The film was produced and directed by K. S. Prakash Rao under the banner Prakash Productions. Cinematography was done by B. S. Ranga. T. V. S. Sarma was in charge of art direction while choreography was done by Katak. The film was produced also in Telugu with the title Dheeksha.

== Soundtrack ==
Music was composed by Pendyala while the lyrics were penned by M. S. Subramaniam.

Song	Singer/s
"Pon Vilaindhathu Jai Enboam"	P. Nageswara Rao & G. Varalakshmi
"Enna Aambule Nee Enna Aambule"	P. Nageswara Rao & G. Varalakshmi
"Pongalo Pongal Pongi Varudhamma"	P. Nageswara Rao & G. Varalakshmi
"Ennamma Ennamma Kanne Namakku Kalyaanam"	P. Nageswara Rao & G. Varalakshmi
"Kanne Paapaa Kaniye Paapaa"	G. Varalakshmi
"Rama Harae Jaya Rama Harae"	G. Varalakshmi
"Anbu Kanindhaal Poodevi"	G. Varalakshmi
"Idho Paar Kaivarisai Sellaadhungka"	
"Aiyaa Ezhai Yaarumillaadha"	M. Satyam & M. Sarojini
"Aedhaagumo Ini Ennaagumo"	
"Theenjuvai Kadhai Idhan"	
"Poadaa Kanne Poayi Nee Paaradaa"	M. S. Ramarao
"Maandhar Enbaar Ivar Thaanaa"	Venkata Krishnan
