= Maaya Rambha =

- Theatrical release poster
- Directed by: T. P. Sundaram
- Story by: Balijepalli Lakshmikantam
- Produced by: T. P. Sundaram
- Starring: N. T. Rama Rao; Anjali Devi
- Cinematography: P. Sridhar
- Edited by: G. D. Joshi
- Music by: Ogirala Ramachandra Rao
- Production company: N. B. Productions
- Release dates: 22 September 1950 (Telugu); 1951 (Tamil)
- Country: India
- Languages: Telugu; Tamil

Maaya Rambha (transl. Magical Rambha) is a 1950 Indian Telugu-language Hindu mythological film, produced and directed by T. P. Sundaram under the N. B. Productions banner. It stars N. T. Rama Rao and Anjali Devi, with music composed by Ogirala Ramachandra Rao. The film was simultaneously shot in Tamil, which was released in 1951.

== Cast ==
- N. T. Rama Rao as Nalakubharudu
- Anjali Devi as Kalavathi
- G. Varalakshmi as Rambha
- C. S. R. as Narada Maharshi
- Kasturi Siva Rao as Udhanda
- K. Raghuramayya as Vidyadhara
- Balijepalli Lakshmikantam as Kapalika
- Kumpatla as Thota Maali
- K. V. Srinivas as Krishna
- A. L. Narayana as Parakaaya Yogi
- Sriranjani as Adavi Pilla
- Surabhi Kamalabai as Kapalini
- Soudamini as Kalavathi's friend
- Jayalakshmi as Vasanthi
- Revathi as Yakshini

== Reception ==
A reviewer for Zamin Ryot praised the performances of the cast especially Anjali Devi, N. T. Rama Rao, and Siva Rao but criticised the direction and technical aspects like photography, sound, and production design.
