= Dongallo Dora =

- Theatrical release poster
- Directed by: P. Chengayya
- Written by: Acharya Aatreya (dialogues)
- Screenplay by: P. Chengayya
- Story by: P. Chengayya
- Produced by: D. L. Narayana
- Starring: Akkineni Nageswara Rao; Jamuna
- Cinematography: K. S. Prasad
- Edited by: P. V. Narayana
- Music by: M. Subrahmanyam Raju
- Production company: Chandamama Films
- Release date: 19 July 1957
- Running time: 142 minutes
- Country: India
- Language: Telugu

Dongallo Dora (transl. Lord in the Thieves) is a 1957 Indian Telugu-language action film, produced by D. L. Narayana under the Chandamama Films banner and directed by P. Chengayya. It stars Akkineni Nageswara Rao and Jamuna, with music composed by M. Subrahmanyam Raju. The film was dubbed into Tamil as Pakka Thirudan.

== Cast ==
- Akkineni Nageswara Rao as Anand
- Jamuna as Indira / Indu
- Relangi as Balaji
- Rajanala as Dasu
- R. Nageswara Rao as Gangaram
- Gummadi as Inspector Ram Murthy
- Mukkamala as CID Das
- K. V. S. Sharma as Tataji
- Balakrishna as Sivam
- Suryakantham as Durgamma
- G. Varalakshmi as Kamini
- E. V. Saroja as Dancer
- Helen as Dancer

== Crew ==
- Art: D. S. Godgaonkar, K. Achyuta Rao
- Choreography: Pasumarthi
- Fights: R. Nageswara Rao
- Dialogues: Acharya Aatreya
- Lyrics: Samudrala Sr, Samudrala Jr., Malladi, Narapa Reddy
- Playback: Ghantasala, P. Leela, Pithapuram, Swarnalatha, K. Rani
- Music: M. Subrahmanyam Raju
- Editing: P. V. Narayana
- Cinematography: K. S. Prasad
- Producer: D. L. Narayana
- Story - Screenplay - Director: P. Chengayya
- Banner: Chandamama Films
- Release Date: 19 July 1957

== Soundtrack ==
Dongallo Dora

Film score by M. Subrahmanyam Raju
- Released: 1957
- Genre: Soundtrack
- Length: 20:08
- Label: His Master's Voice
- Producer: M. Subrahmanyam Raju

=== Telugu Songs ===
Music composed by M. Subrahmanyam Raju. Music released on His Master's Voice.

S. No.	Song title	Lyrics	Singers	length
1	"Maadhavaa"	Samudrala Sr	P. Leela	03:54
2	"Vanne Choodu Raajaa"	Samudrala Jr	K. Rani	03:35
3	"Oho Raani Oho Raja"	Malladi Ramakrishna Sastry	Ghantasala & P. Leela	03:18
4	Vinnavaa Chinnadaanaa	Narapa Reddy	Ghantasala & P. Leela	03:24
5	"Aasale Maruna"	Malladi Ramakrishna Sastry	Ghantasala & P. Leela	03:42
6	"Nannelu Mohanudedamma"	Samudrala Sr	P. Leela	02:42
7	"Enduko Ee Payanamu"	Malladi Ramakrishna Sastry	Ghantasala	02:57
8	Aadukundam Raave Jantaga	Samudrala Jr	Swarnalatha & K. Rani	03:08
9	"Undali Undali Nuvvu Nenu Undali"	Narapa Reddy	Pithapuram Nageswara Rao	02:48
10	"Hoyalu Golupu"	Samudrala Sr	K. Rani	02:31

=== Tamil Songs ===
Music for songs was composed by T. M. Ibrahim and the lyrics were penned by Ku. Ma. Balasubramaniam, Kuyilan, Mugavai Rajamanikkam & Ku. Sa. Krishnamoorthy. Playback singers are Sirkazhi Govindarajan, A. M. Rajah, S. V. Ponnusamy, P. Leela, Jikki, Swarnalatha & Udutha Sarojini.

S. No.	Song title	Lyrics	Singers	Duration (mm:ss)
1	Maasilaa Gaana Lola	Ku. Ma. Balasubramaniam	P. Leela	03:27
2	"Vannakkuyil Naane"	Ku. Ma. Balasubramaniam	Jikki	02:51
3	"Oho Rani, Oho Raja"	Kuyilan	Sirkazhi Govindarajan & P. Leela	02:55
4	"Penne Vaa Chinna Raani"	Kuyilan	Sirkazhi Govindarajan & P. Leela	03:24
5	"Aasaiye Maarumaa"	Kuyilan	Sirkazhi Govindarajan & P. Leela	03:26
6	"En Asai Mohan Enge Amma"	Mugavai Rajamanikkam	Jikki	02:27
7	"Veenil Eno Vedhanai"	Mugavai Rajamanikkam	A. M. Rajah	03:38
8	"Aaduvom Naame Nee Vaa"	Ku. Sa. Krishnamoorthy	Swarnalatha & Udutha Sarojini	03:08
9	"Oyyaari Oyyaari"	Ku. Sa. Krishnamoorthy	S. V. Ponnusamy	02:43
10	"Ullatthai Urukkum Vanappu"	Ku. Sa. Krishnamoorthy	Jikki	03:17
