= Drohi (1948 film) =

- Directed by: L. V. Prasad
- Written by: Tapi Dharma Rao
- Produced by: K. S. Prakash Rao
- Starring: G. Varalakshmi; Lakshmirajyam; K. S. Prakash Rao; Kona Prabhakar Rao; Kasturi Shiva Rao; L. V. Prasad; Rallabandi Kutumba Rao; Surabhi Balasaraswati
- Cinematography: Sreedhar
- Music by: Pendyala Nageshwara Rao
- Release date: 10 December 1948
- Running time: 179 minutes
- Country: India
- Language: Telugu

Drohi (transl. The Traitor) is a 1948 Telugu-language drama film directed by L. V. Prasad. This was the debut film for Pendyala Nageswara Rao as music director.

== The plot ==
Saroja (Varalakshmi), daughter of Zamindar Gangadhar Rao (Rallabandi), is an arrogant young woman. She loves Raja Rao (Kona Prabhakar Rao), who assists her father in instituting wrong things. He accidentally kills an old man while driving her car. Dr. Prakash (Prakash Rao) provides shelter to his granddaughter Seetha (Lakshmirajyam). Seetha helps Dr. Prakash in his social service activities. Dr. Prakash marries Saroja. Since then she hates Seetha, harasses her, and drives her from the hospital. Prakash continues his social service in the village with the help of Seetha. Knowing this, Gangadhar Rao, with the help of Raja Rao, sets village huts on fire. The angry villagers try to attack them. Seetha, with her kindness, convinces and stops them, but during her attempt, succumbs to bullet wounds. Saroja changes her mind and gets her father and Raja Rao arrested. She distributes her riches among the poor people.

Drohi advertisement in 1948 issue of Chandamama magazine.

== Cast ==
- G. Varalakshmi as Saroja
- Lakshmirajyam as Seeta
- K. S. Prakash Rao as Dr. Prakash
- Rallabandi Kutumba Rao as Gangadhara Rao
- Kona Prabhakara Rao as Raja Rao
- L. V. Prasad
- Kasturi Siva Rao as Compounder
- Venkumamba
- Surabhi Balasaraswati

== Songs ==
- "Aalakinchandi Babu Alakinchandi"
- "Chakkaligintalu Levaa Chakkani Oohalu Raavaa" (Lyrics: Tapi Dharma Rao; Singer: G. Varalakshmi)
- "Endukee Bratuku" (Lyrics: Tapi Dharma Rao; Singer: K. Jamuna Rani)
- "Idenaa Nee Nyayamu" (Lyrics: Tapi Dharma Rao; Singer: M. S. Ramarao)
- "Poovu Cheri Palumaaru Tiruguchu Paata Paadunadi Emo" (Lyrics: Tapi Dharma Rao; Singers: Ghantasala and G. Varalakshmi)

== 1970 film ==
The film Drohi was also made in 1970, directed by K. Bapaiah and starring Jaggayya, Vanisree and S. Varalakshmi.
