= Manavathi =

- Directed by: Y. V. Rao
- Screenplay by: Telugu: Tamil: Chidambaram A. M. Nataraja Kavi
- Starring: Mukkamala; C. H. Narayana Rao; P. K. Saraswathi; Sriranjani Jr.
- Music by: H. R. Padmanabha Sastry; B. Rajanikanta Rao
- Production company: Sarvodaya Films
- Release date: March 1952
- Running time: 190 min.
- Country: India
- Languages: Telugu; Tamil

Manavathi is a 1952 Indian film produced in two language editions, Telugu and Tamil. The film was directed by Y. V. Rao. The film stars Mukkamala and Madhuri Devi.

== Cast ==
List adapted from the database of Film News Anandan and from IMDb.(see external links)

Male cast

- Mukkamala
- C. H. Narayana Rao
- Relangi
- M. V. Mani

Female cast

- Madhuri Devi
- P. K. Saraswathi
- G. Varalakshmi
- Sriranjani Jr.

== Production ==
The film was produced in Telugu and Tamil under the banner Sarvodaya Films and was directed by Y. V. Rao. Chidambaram A. M. Nataraja Kavi wrote the Tamil dialogues.

== Soundtrack ==
Music was composed by H. R. Padmanabha Sastry and B. Rajanikanta Rao.

Tamil

Lyrics were written by Chidambaram A. M. Nataraja Kavi.

Song	Singer/s	Lyrics	Duration (m:ss)
"Gopaalaa Gunaseela"	A. P. Komala	Chidambaram A. M. Nataraja Kavi	03:06
"Anbu Kondaendhum"	R. Balasaraswathi Devi	Chidambaram A. M. Nataraja Kavi	03:20
"Thanadhu Adamae Thaan"	R. Balasaraswathi Devi	Chidambaram A. M. Nataraja Kavi	03:05
"O Malaiya Maarudhame"	R. Balasaraswathi Devi & R.Vijaya Rao	Chidambaram A. M. Nataraja Kavi	03:20
"En Raajaave Idhu"	Jikki	Chidambaram A. M. Nataraja Kavi	03:11
"Uthiravu Kodungo"	Jikki	Chidambaram A. M. Nataraja Kavi	
"Eno Ezhupinaan Ennai"	P. Leela	Chidambaram A. M. Nataraja Kavi	03:03
"Maamalar Vaname"	P. Leela	Chidambaram A. M. Nataraja Kavi	03:21
"Paaraayo En Vaaraayo"	P. Leela	Chidambaram A. M. Nataraja Kavi	03:21
"En Maasaki En Maasaki"	S. Rajam & P. Leela	Chidambaram A. M. Nataraja Kavi	
"Punniya Dheviye Maanavathi"	S. Rajam & P. Leela	Chidambaram A. M. Nataraja Kavi	03:07
