= Harichandra (1968 film) =

1968 film by Kovelamudi Surya Prakash Rao

- Poster
- Directed by: K. S. Prakash Rao
- Written by: A. K. Velan (dialogues); Udhaya Kumar (dialogues)
- Produced by: G. Varalakshmi
- Starring: Sivaji Ganesan; G. Varalakshmi
- Cinematography: M. Masthan; R. R. Chandiran
- Edited by: Babu
- Music by: K. V. Mahadevan
- Production company: Pramodha Films
- Release date: 11 April 1968
- Country: India
- Language: Tamil

Harichandra is a 1968 Indian Tamil-language Hindu mythological film, directed by K. S. Prakash Rao and produced by G. Varalakshmi, based on the life of Harishchandra. The film stars Sivaji Ganesan and G. Varalakshmi. It was released on 11 April 1968.

== Plot ==
Harichandra is the ruler of Ayodhya belonging to Raghuvamsa. He has never lied to anyone and has always kept his word in his life which he values above everything else. Viswamithran challenges his rival Rishi Vashista that he will make Harichandra to lie or renege on his word. Vishwamitran demands Harichandra to give over his kingdom as he had promised him the same in his dream. Taking that a sage as revered as him would not bluff, Harichandra proceeds to hand it over and moves to Kasi. To give the mandatory salutary alms to be given to sages, considering that Harichandra now has nothing to give; Nachandra is sent by Vishwamitran to collect the same. Harichandra sells his wife and son to Kalakandan and pays the due but Nachandra asks for his fee for wasting his time. Harichandra sells himself to Veerabaghu and pays all the due.

Viswamithran tries various methods to make Harichandra suffer by contriving the death of his son as well as having his wife accused of murdering the prince, forcing Harichandra to be the executioner. Harichandra however proceeds without saying a word against anyone. In the end, Viswamithran accepts defeat and restores Harichandra to the throne.

== Cast ==
Cast according to the opening credits and the songbook:

Male cast

- Sivaji Ganesan as Harichandra Maharaja
- T. S. Balaiah as Veerabaghu
- K. A. Thangavelu as Nachandra Iyer
- M. N. Nambiar as Vishvamitran
- V. K. Ramasamy as Kalakandan
- O. A. K. Thevar as Kasiraja
- M. K. Mustafa as Minister
- Ajith Singh as Indran
- S. Rama Rao as Vishvamitran's disciple
- Master Anandan as Logidas
- R. Subbaraman as Hunter
- M. Balraj as Shivan
- Jothi Shanmugam

Female cast

- G. Varalakshmi as Chandramathi
- T. P. Muthulakshmi as Kalakandi
- Mohana as Veerabaghu's wife
- Sarala Devi as Parvathi
- Kanagasri

Dance

- E. V. Saroja
- Kusalakumari
- Gopi Krishna
- Sasi

== Soundtrack ==
Music was composed by K. V. Mahadevan.

Song	Singers	Lyrics	Length
"Andhanarum Dheiveega Amararum"	T. M. Soundararajan	Thanjai N. Ramaiah Dass	01:29
"Oraam Maadham Udaladhu Thalarndhu"	R. Balasaraswathi Devi	Thanjai N. Ramaiah Dass	02:04
"Kaasiyil Vaazhum Karunai Kadale"	T. M. Soundararajan	Thanjai N. Ramaiah Dass	03:25
"Aadum Mayile Venumaa"	K. Rani & Udutha Sarojini	Thanjai N. Ramaiah Dass	03:19
"Ulagam Ariyaadha Pudhumai"	T. M. Soundararajan	Thanjai N. Ramaiah Dass	04:01
"Naranaiyum Nee Padaitthaai"	R. Balasaraswathi Devi	Thanjai N. Ramaiah Dass	03:05
"Yaar Poi Solluvaar"	T. M. Soundararajan	Thanjai N. Ramaiah Dass	03:44
"Idhu Ingeyirukku Adhu Angeyirukku"	S. C. Krishnan & S. V. Ponnusamy	Thanjai N. Ramaiah Dass	04:06
"Aaradi Kalli Nee Thaan"	T. M. Soundararajan	Thanjai N. Ramaiah Dass	00:37
"Aadhiyilum Paraiyan Alla"	T. M. Soundararajan	Thanjai N. Ramaiah Dass	01:55
"Aadhavaa... Ponnudane Porul Niraindhu"	T. M. Soundararajan & S. V. Ponnusami	Thanjai N. Ramaiah Dass	04:24
"Needi Dhevam Ulagil"	T. M. Soundararajan & Udutha Sarojini	Thanjai N. Ramaiah Dass	01:54
"Vinnavar Kadhiye Potri"	T. M. Soundararajan	Udhayakumar	01:13
