= Tapi Dharma Rao =

Indian writer, journalist, and social reformer (1887–1973)

Thapi Dharma Rao
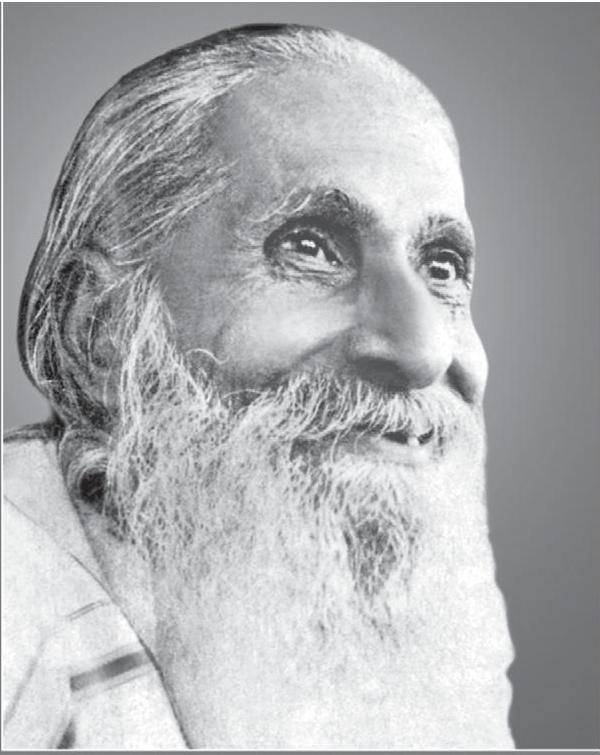
- Born: 19 September 1887; Berhampur, India
- Died: 08-05-1973
- Education: B.A.
- Alma mater: Pachaiyappa's College, Chennai
- Spouse: Thapi Annapoornamma
- Children: Two daughters and three sons (including Tapi Chanakya)
- Writing career
- Pen name: Thapi Dharma Rao Naidu
- Genres: Writer, Poet, Lyricist
- Notable awards: Sahitya Akademi Award

Thapi Dharma Rao Naidu (1887–1973) was a Telugu writer, journalist, rationalist, and social reformer. He is considered as a pioneer of colloquial language in Telugu journalism and a doyen of Telugu prose writers. He was awarded the Sahitya Akademi Award by India's National Academy of Letters in 1971. He authored many books which were the eye openers in the field of social sciences in India, in particular South India. His literary works like Vidhi Vilasam have found a place in the annals of Indian literature. He also wrote dialogues and lyrics for films like Mala Pilla (1938), Raithu Bidda (1939), Drohi (1948), Rojulu Marayi (1955).

== Honours ==
- Andhra Sahitya Akademi honored him with 'Visishta Sabhyathvam'.
- The chief priest of Sringeri Sharada Peetham honored him by conferring the title 'Andhra Visarada' for his extraordinary service to Telugu language.
- He was senate member of Sri Venkateswara University.

== Family ==
Thapi Dharma Rao Naidu had two daughters and three sons.

== Literary works ==
- Devalayala Meeda Bhutu Bommalenduku?
- Pelli- Dani Puttupurvotharalu
- Inupakatchadalu
- Pathapali, Kotha Pali
- All India Adukkutinevalla Mahasabha
- Sahityamormaralu
- Rallu-Rappalu is his autobiography from 1887 to 1908
- Translated Leo Tolstoy's Anna Karenina into Telugu (1952)

== Filmography ==
- Mohini Rugmangada (1937)
- Malapilla (1938) (dialogue)
- Raithu Bidda (1939) (dialogue)
- Illalu (1940)
- Krishna Prema (1943) (adaptation) (dialogue)
- Drohi (1948)
- Keelugurram (1949)
- Palletoori Pilla (1950) (dialogue)
- Paramanandayya Shishyula Katha (1950) (adaptation) (dialogue)
- Mangala (1951) (dialogue)
- Kanna Talli (1953)
- Rojulu Marayi (1955) (dialogue)
