= Polygar Wars =

Indian conflict between the British East India Company and Polygars

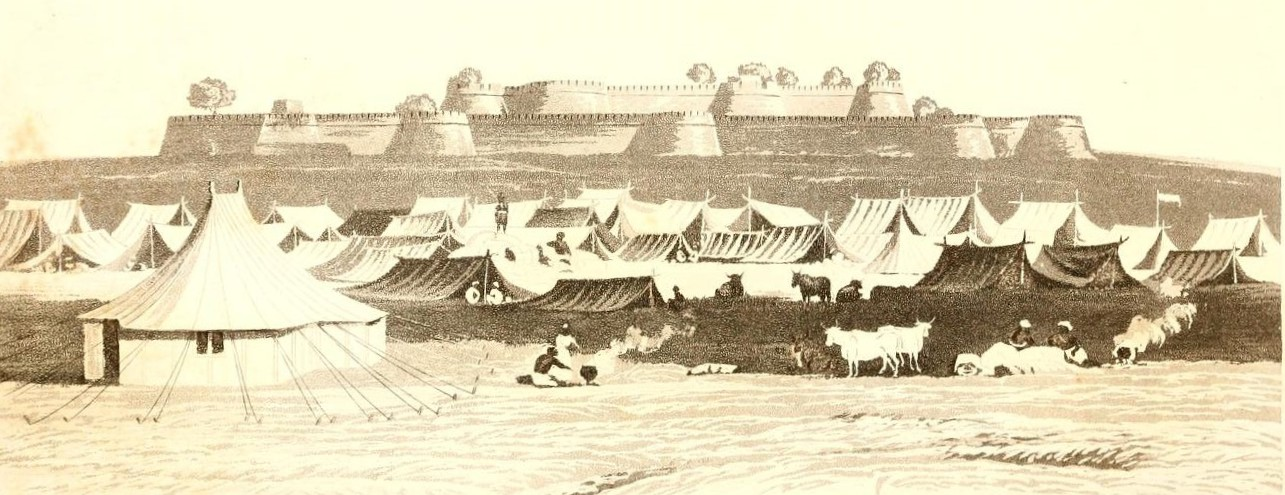
Polygar Wars

The Polygar Wars or Palaiyakkarar Wars (Tamil: [paːɭai̯jɐkːaːɾɐɾ]) were wars fought between the Polygars (Palaiyakkarars) of the former Tirunelveli Kingdom in Tamil Nadu, India and the British East India Company's Madras Regiment between March 1799 to May 1802 or July 1805. The British finally won after carrying out gruelling protracted jungle campaigns against the Polygar armies. Many people died on both sides and the victory over the Polygars brought large parts of the territories of Tamil Nadu under British control, enabling them to get a strong hold in Southern India.

== First Polygar War ==
The Polygar Wars were a series of wars fought by a coalition of Palaiyakkarar's against the British between 1750 and 1805. The war between the British and Puli Thevar is often classified as the First Polygar war (1752 to 1767). The war between the British and Kattabomman Nayak of Panchalankurichi Palayam in the then Tirunelveli region is the second Polygar war in history. In 1799, a brief meeting (over pending taxes) between Kattabomman and the British ended in a bloody encounter in which the British commander of the forces was slain by the former. A price was put on Kattabomman's head prompting many Polygars to an open rebellion.

After a series of battles in the Panchalankurichi fort with additional reinforcements from Tiruchirapalli, Kattabomman was defeated, but he escaped to the jungles in Pudukottai country. He was captured by the British with the help of Ettappan, Pudukottai Raja after his backroom agreement with the British. After a summary trial, Kattabomman was hanged in front of the public in order to intimidate them in Kayatharu.

Subramania Pillai, a close associate of Kattabomman, was also publicly hanged and his head was fixed on a pike at Panchalankurichi for public view. Soundra Pandian, another rebel leader, was brutally killed by having his head smashed against a village wall. Kattabomman's brother Oomathurai was imprisoned in Palayamkottai Central Prison while the fort was razed to the ground and wealth looted by the troops.

== Second Polygar War ==
Despite the suppression of the First Polygar War in 1799, a rebellion broke out again in 1800. The Second Polygar War was more stealthy and covert in nature. The rebellion broke out when a band of Palayakkarar armies bombed the British barracks in Coimbatore. In the war that followed, Oomaithurai allied himself with Maruthu Pandiyar and was part of a grand alliance against the company which included Kerala Varma Pazhassi Raja of Malabar.

The Palayakarrars had artillery and a weapon manufacturing unit in Salem and Dindigul jungles. They also received clandestine training from the French in the Karur region. Dheeran Chinnamalai Gounder headed the western Tamil Nadu popularly known as Kongu Nadu. The British columns were exposed throughout the operations to constant harassing attacks and had usually to cut their way through almost impenetrable jungles fired on from undercover on all sides. The Polygars resisted stubbornly and the storming of their hill-forts proved on several occasions sanguinary (involving or causing much bloodshed) work.

The British finally won after a long expensive campaign that took more than a year. The Company forces led by Lt. Colonel Agnew laid siege to the Panchalankurichi fort and captured it in May 1801 after a prolonged siege and artillery bombardment. Oomaithurai escaped the fall of the fort and joined Maruthu brothers at their jungle fort at Kalayar Kovil. The Company forces pursued him there and eventually captured Kalayar Kovil in October 1801. Oomaithurai and the Maruthu brothers were hanged on 16 November 1801 at Tiruppathur (Sivagangai Dist.).

== Third Polygar War ==
A final Polygar War in 1847 against the British was fought by Uyyalawada Narasimha Reddy at Kovelakuntla (Koilakuntla). He and his commander-in-chief Vadde Obanna were at the heart of a freedom movement against Company rule in India in 1847, where 5,000 Indian peasants rose up in revolt against the British East India Company in Nandyal district. The rebels were protesting against the changes introduced by the Company authorities to the traditional agrarian system in the first half of the nineteenth century. These changes include the introduction of the ryotwari system and other attempts to maximize revenue through exploiting lower-status cultivators through implementing exploitative working conditions. The revolt took thousands of Company soldiers to suppress, with Reddy's death bringing it to an end.

== Results ==
The suppression of the Polygar rebellions of 1799 and 1800-1805 resulted in the liquidation of the influence of the chieftains. Under the terms of the Carnatic Treaty (31 July 1801), the British assumed direct control over Tamil Nadu. The Polygar system which had flourished for two and a half centuries came to a violent end and the company introduced a Zamindari settlement in its place. In subsequent years, legend and folklore developed around Kattabomman, Maruthu Pandiyar and Uyyalawada Narasimha Reddy.

== See also ==
- Indian rebellion of 1857
- Veeran Sundaralingam
- Rani Velu Nachiar
- Tipu Sultan
- Hyder Ali
- Uyyalawada Narasimha Reddy
