= Veerapandi =

Veerapandi may refer to the following places in Tamil Nadu, India:

- Veerapandi, Coimbatore
- Veerapandi, Salem
  - Veerapandi block, containing the above
- Veerapandi, Theni
- Veerapandi, Viluppuram
- Veerapandi (State Assembly Constituency)

== See also ==
- Veerapandian, Indian surname
- Veerapandiyan, 1987 Indian film
- Veerapandiya Kattabomman, Indian ruler
  - Veerapandiya Kattabomman (book), a 1940 book about him by M. P. Sivagnanam
  - Veerapandiya Kattabomman (film), 1959 Indian film by B. R. Panthulu based on the book
- Veerapandy S. Arumugam, Indian politician
- Veerapandiyapuram, 2022 Indian film
- Athi Veerapandiyan, an unrealized Indian film starring Kamal Haasan
- Kattabomman (disambiguation)
