= Maniyachchi =

Coordinates: 8°51′47″N 77°53′42″E

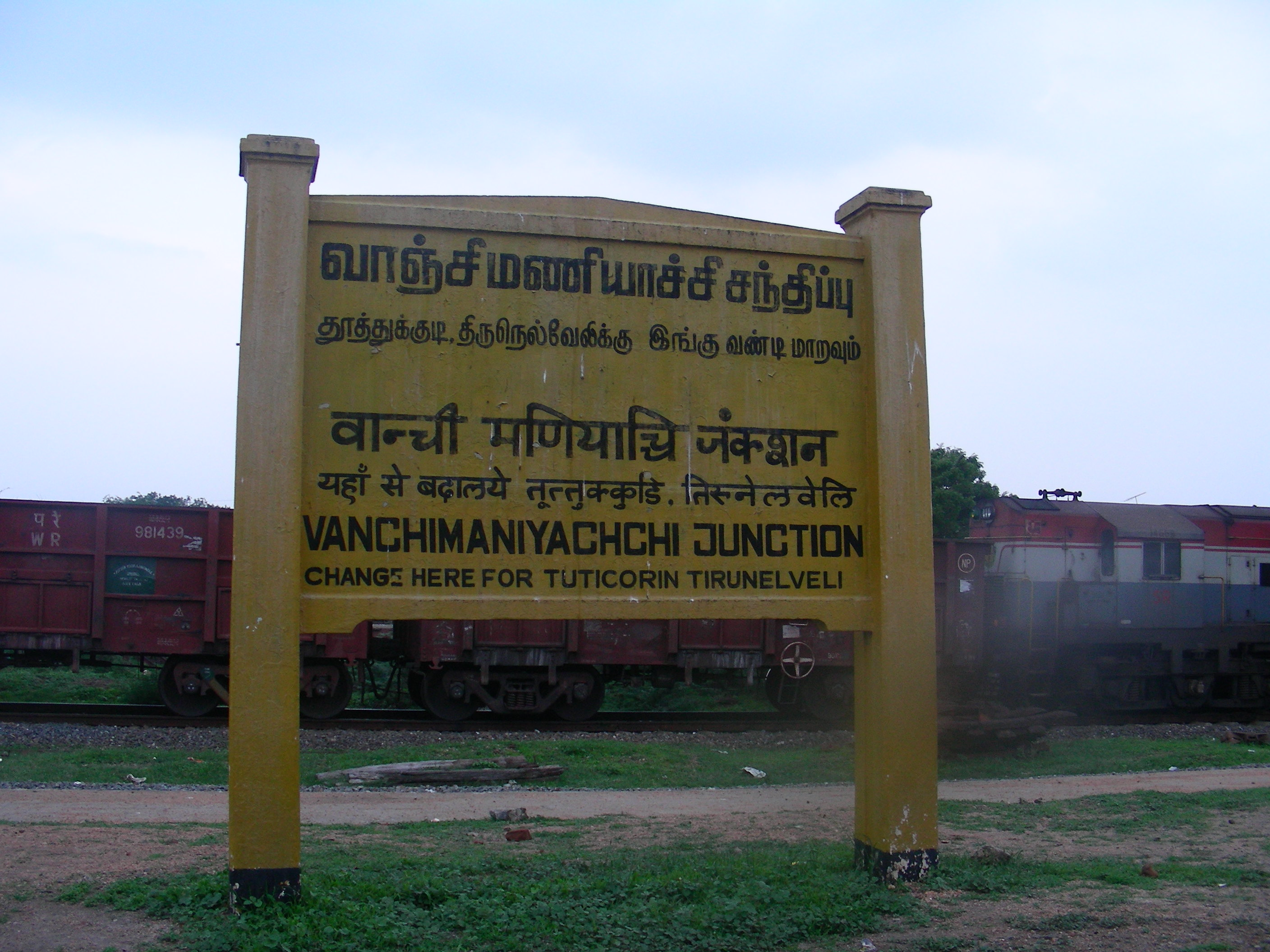
The railway station at Maniyachchi, named Vanchi Maniyachchi in honour of Vanchinathan, an Indian Tamil freedom fighter.

Maniyachchi is a township in the Thoothukudi district of Tamil Nadu situated approximately 40 km west of Thootukudi and some 30 km from Palayamkottai and Kovilpatti.

== History ==
From once being a sparsely inhibited village, Maniyachchi was a site of significance during the Anti-Imperialist struggle in the Madras Presidency and it was here where the tyrannical British Collector of Tirunelveli Robert Ashe was shot by Vanchinathan an Indian Tamil freedom fighter who would later commit suicide after having killed the British Collector.

On 17 June 1911, Vanchi assassinated Ashe, the district collector of Tirunelveli, who was also known as Collector Dorai. He shot Ashe at point-blank range when Ashe's train had stopped at the Maniyachi station, en route to Madras.

After the shooting, Vanchinathan ran along the platform and briefly took cover in the latrine. Some time later he was found dead, having shot himself in the mouth. His pocket contained the following letter:

"The mlechas of England having captured our country, tread over the sanathana dharma of the Hindus and destroy them. Every Indian is trying to drive out the English and get swarajyam and restore sanathana dharma. Our Raman, Sivaji, Krishnan, Guru Govindan, Arjuna ruled our land protecting all dharmas and in this land they are making arrangements to crown George V, a mlecha, and one who eats the flesh of cows. Three thousand Madrasees have taken a vow to kill George V as soon as he lands in our country. In order to make others know our intention, I who am the least in the company, have done this deed this day. This is what everyone in Hindustan should consider it as his duty. sd/- R. Vanchi Aiyar, Shencottah"

The railway station where the assassination occurred was named Vanchi Maniyachchi in the honor of Vanchinathan. Today, the station is one of an important junctions in the Southern Railway Zone where south-bound trains to both Tirunelveli and Thootukudi pass by.
