= Oomaithurai =

Indian poligar

Oomathurai (real name Kumarasamy Naiyakar), was an Indian Poligar (Palaiyakkarar) from Tamil Nadu, who fought against the British East India Company in the Polygar Wars. He was the younger brother of Veerapandiya Kattabomman.

Oomathurai was an active participant in the Polygar Wars, and in the first war, he was captured and imprisoned in the Palayamkottai Central Prison. On 2 February 1801, he managed to escape from prison after more than an year's imprisonment and rebuild the Panchalankurichi fort, which had been destroyed in the first war. In the second Polygar war, Oomathurai formed an alliance with the [Parathavarama pandiyan Marudhu brothers of Sivagangai, Dheeran Chinnamalai, Kerala Varma of Malabar and other leaders, to resist the British East India Company. The fort was eventually captured by the British after a prolonged siege led by Lt. Colonel Agnew and artillery bombardment in May 1801. Oomathurai managed to escape the fall of the fort and joined the Maruthu brothers in their jungle fort at Kalayar Kovil. Despite their efforts, the British eventually captured Kalayar Kovil in October 1801. Oomathurai and Sevathaiah were captured and hanged at Panchalamkurichi on 16 November 1801.
