= Kattabomman (disambiguation) =

Veerapandiya Kattabomman was an 18th-century Palayakarrar ('Polygar') chieftain of Tenkasi in southern India.

Kattabomman may also refer to:

- INS Kattabomman, an Indian Navy transmission facility
- Kattabomman (film), a 1993 Indian Tamil-language film

== See also ==
- Veerapandi (disambiguation)
- Veerapandiya Kattabomman (book), a 1940 book about the chieftain by M. P. Sivagnana
- Veerapandiya Kattabomman (film), a 1959 Indian Tamil-language film by B. R. Panthulu based on the book
