= Temples of Tirunelveli =

Temples in Tirunelveli, Tamil Nadu, India

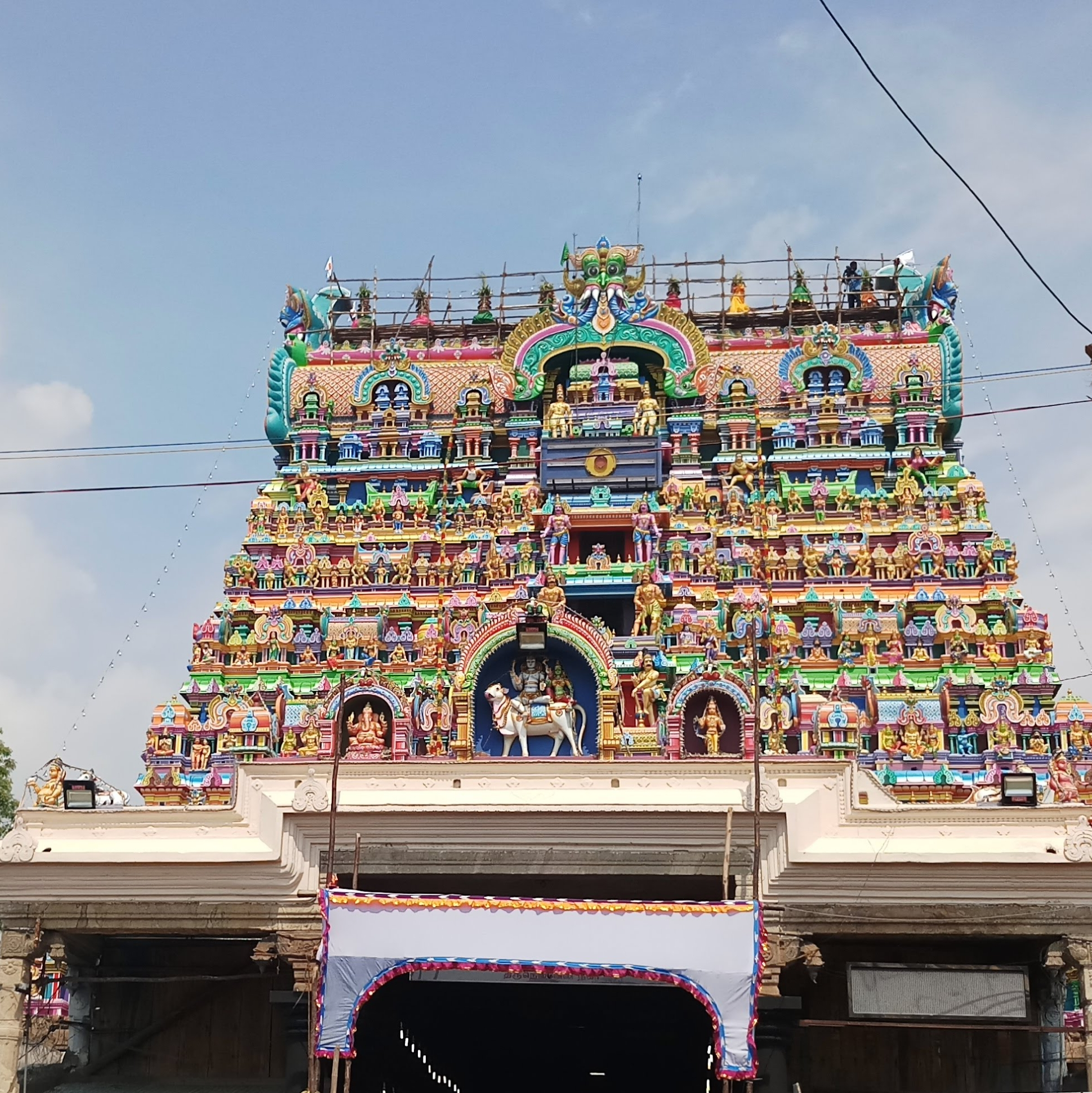
Nellaiappar Temple, the most prominent temple in Tirunelveli

The following are temples located in Tirunelveli, India.

== Temples ==
=== Nellaiappar Temple ===
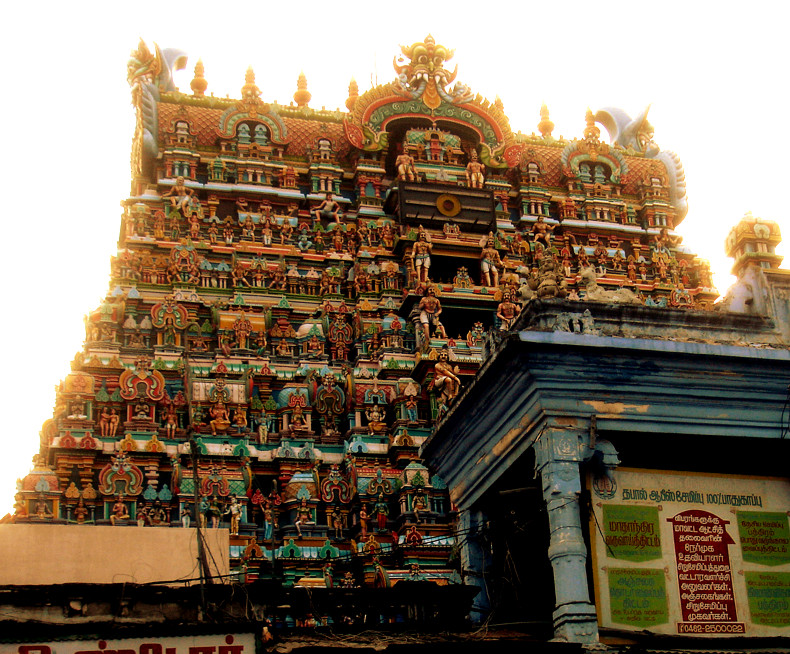
Nellaiappar Gopuram

Nellaiappar Temple is one of the largest Shiva Temples of Tamil Nadu. The temple is situated in the centre of the city at a distance of two kilometres from the railway station in Tirunelveli Town. The main Railway station is situated in Tirunelveli Junction railway station. It is a twin temple dedicated to Parvati and Shiva.

=== Sri Varadharaja Perumal Kovil ===
Sri Varadharaja Perumal Kovil is situated at Tirunelveli Junction. This temple is an ancient and reputed Vishnu temple. It lies on the banks of the Thamirabarani River.

=== Mela Thiruvenkatanathapuram Temple ===
The Mela Thiruvenkatanathapuram temple's sanctum has a Lord Srinivasa statue. The temple is located about 10 km (6.2 mi) southwest of Tirunelveli, also beside the banks of Thamirabarani river. This temple is also called Thirunankovil.

=== Keezha Thiruvenkatanathapuram Temple ===
Sri Varadharaja Perumal Kovil is located in Keezha Thiruvengadanaadhapuram, which is just half a kilometer from the Then Thirupathi Shri Venkataachalapathy Temple. Due to presence of red soil in the area where the temple is located, it derives its name of Sengani - Sen meaning Red and Kani meaning Land in Tamil. The name was later changed to Sangani. This temple lies to the east of Then Thirupathi Perumal, about 6 km (3.7 mi) from Tirunelveli.

=== Sri Kalakodi Dharma Sastha Temple Karakurichi ===
This is near Tirunelveli. Nearest location is Ambasamudram. When travelling towards Karakurichi from Nagercoil, we pass through Thovala, Ervadi, Kalakkad, Cheranmahadevi and next Karakurichi and road goes to AmbaSamudram and from there to Papanasam.

An Ayyappa temple is situated in Karakurichi, Sri Kalakodi Dharma Sastha Temple, near a river, people call it koovam. Lord Ayyappa is the main deity, sub deities are Ganapathy, Shiva, Navagrahas and Veera Bhadran. Navagrahas are present along with their wives, that is Dampathy Sametha. Kumbhabhisekam of the temple was conducted recently. Two festivals are important here; that is during Mandala Pooja and Panguni Utthra. A Laksharchana is conducted during Mandala Pooja with other abhisekhams.

=== Sri Chekkadi Saasthaa Temple ===
Between Nellai Appar Sannadhi and Ghandimathi Amman Sannadhi there is a small lane near Saraswathi Ambaal temple. Through that lane is Chekkadi Saastha temple (Lord Ayyappan with Poorana, Pushkala), an ancient temple.

=== Azhagiya Kootthar and Sivagami Ambal Temple ===
Sri Azhagiya Koothar Temple at Rajavallipuram near Tirunelveli is a Natarajar temple situated on the banks of Tamirabarani River. Locals also refer to it as Sepparai. Lord Natarajar and Sivagami Ambal are the main deities while Nellaiappar, Gandhimathi Ambal amongst others, are minor deities. Kumbhavisekam was conducted in January 2007. Two important festivals here are Aani Therottam and Margazhi Thiruvadhira.

=== Vaithya Lingam Temple ===
Vaithya Lingam Temple is located at Aladipatti, which is 30 km (19 mi) from Tirunelveli on the way to Tenkasi. The temple's sanctum has sri vaithya lingam swami and goddess yogambigai. The other deities of the temple for various castes of people are Sudalai Madan Samy and Karuppa Samy.

=== Sree Sudalai Eswarar Thirukovil ===
This Temple is one of the oldest of all Sudalai temples located at Maramangalam, Srivaikundam which is 44 km (27 mi) from Tirunelveli and 24 km (15 mi) from Thoothukudi. The temple's sanctum has Lord shiva, Ganesh, sri Sudalai Eswarar, Sivanaitha Perumal. The other deities of the temple Bala sudalai, Pathirakali Amman, Karrupasamy, Bhrama sakthi, Sathiraathi Mundaswamy, Pechi amman, Muneswarar
