= Vanchi Maniyachchi Junction railway station =

Railway station in Tamil Nadu, India

Vanchi Maniyachchi Junction Vanji Maniyachchi Sandhippu
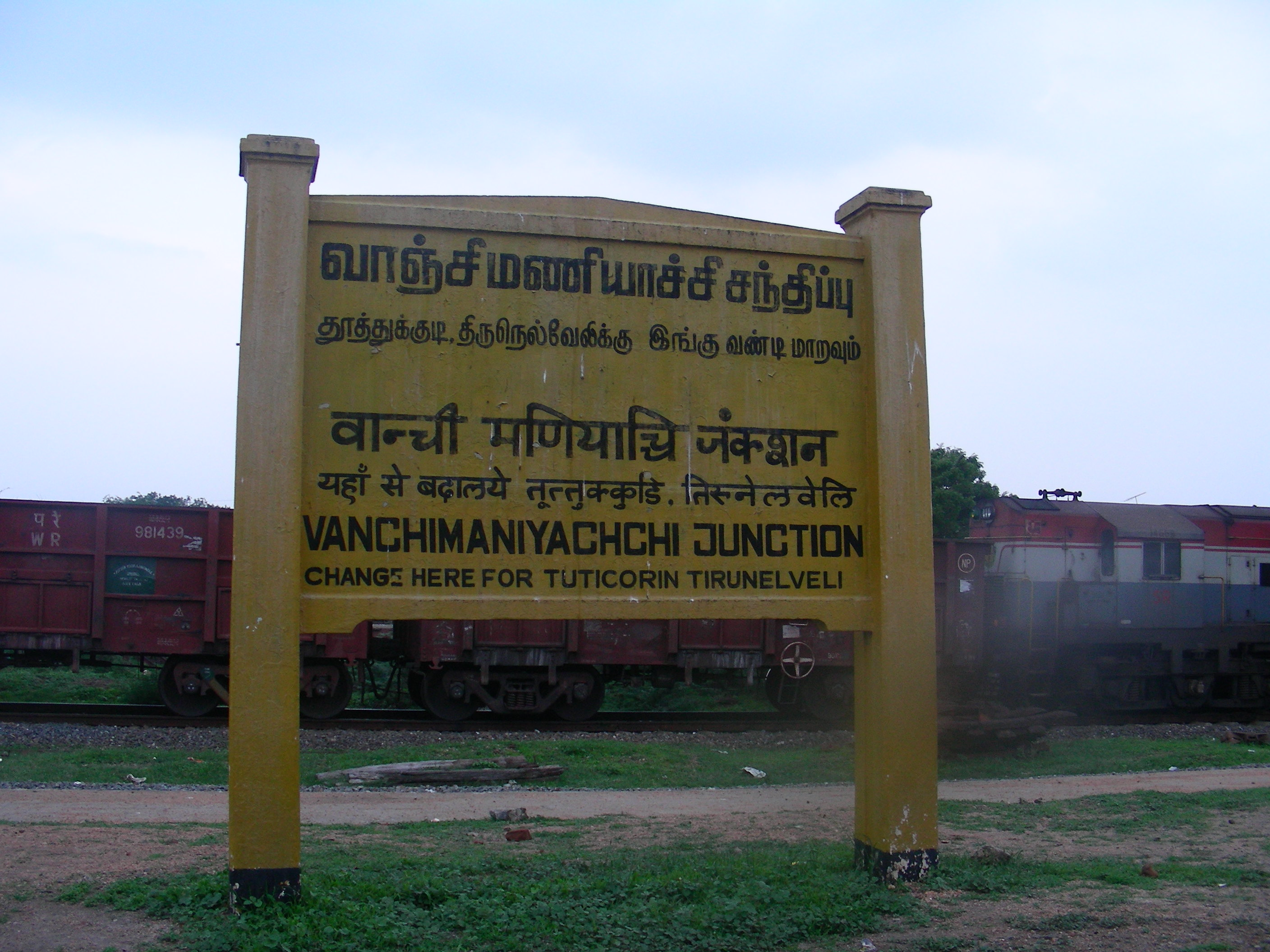
- Name board at train station

General information
- Location: Ottantham-Maniyachchi Road, Maniyachchi, Thoothukudi district, Tamil Nadu; India
- Coordinates: 8.8811°N 77.8913°E
- Elevation: 70 metres (230 ft)
- System: Indian Railways station
- Owner: Indian Railways
- Operator: Southern Railway zone
- Platforms: 4
- Tracks: 6

Construction
- Structure type: Standard (on-ground station)
- Parking: Yes

Other information
- Status: Functioning
- Station code: MEJ
- Zone(s): Southern Railway zone
- Division(s): Madurai
- Fare zone: Indian Railways

History
- Opened: 1876; 150 years ago

Passengers
- 2022–23: 192,651 (per year); 528 (per day)
Location
- Location within India Location within Tamil Nadu

Vanchi Maniyachchi Junction railway station (station code: MEJ) is an NSG–5 category Indian railway station in Madurai railway division of Southern Railway zone. It serves Maniyachchi, located in Thoothukudi district of the Indian state of Tamil Nadu.

== History ==
The station is named after the Tamil freedom fighter Vanchinathan and was the site of assassination of the British Collector, Robert Ashe. Today the station is a significant station in the Madurai railway division of the Southern Railway Zone, one of the six divisions established within the Southern Railway zone others being Chennai, Tiruchchirappalli, Salem, Palakkad and Thiruvananthapuram. A notification regarding a change in name has been issued by Southern Railway on 26-10-1988

== Location and layout ==
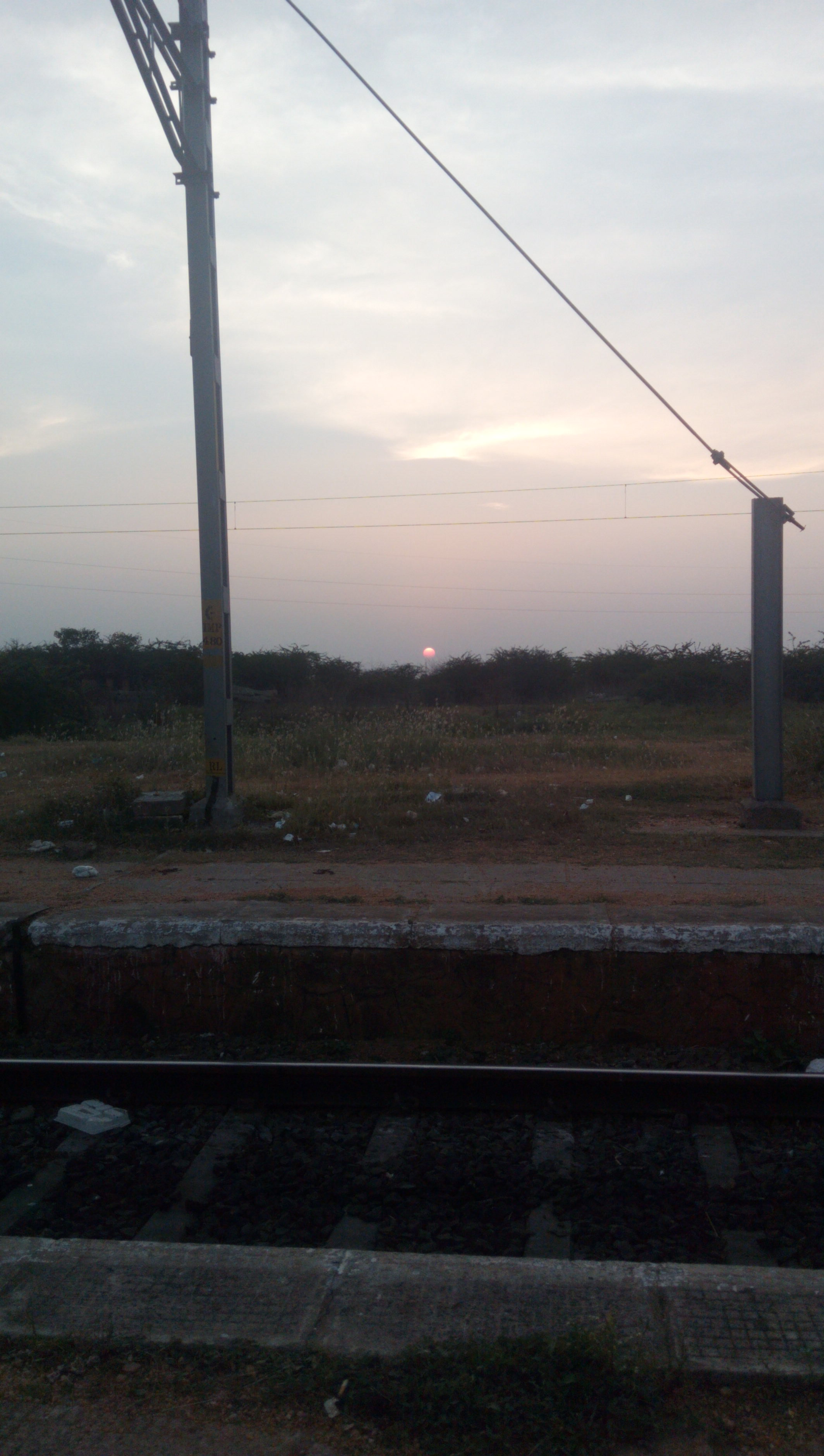
Sunset at Vanchi Maniyachi Junction

The station is located on the Ottantham-Maniyachchi Road at a distance of 30 kilometres (19 mi) from Thoothukudi, its district headquarters. The following three lines connect the station

- BG single line towards the north via Virudhunagar Junction.
- BG single line towards the south via Tirunelveli Junction.
- BG single line towards the east to Thoothukudi.

== Performance and earnings ==
For the FY 2022–23, the annual earnings of the station was ₹30,015,508 (US$310,000) and daily earnings was ₹82,234 (US$850). For the same financial year, the annual passenger count was 192,651 and daily count was 528. While, the footfall per day was recorded as 816.
