= Kappalottiya Thamizhan =

1961 film by B. R. Panthulu

- Theatrical release poster
- Directed by: B. R. Panthulu
- Screenplay by: Chithra Krishnaswamy
- Based on: Kappalottiya Thamizhan by M. P. Sivagnanam
- Produced by: B. R. Panthulu
- Starring: Sivaji Ganesan; Gemini Ganesan; Savitri
- Cinematography: W. R. Subba Rao; Karnan
- Edited by: R. Devarajan
- Music by: G. Ramanathan
- Production company: Padmini Pictures
- Release date: 7 November 1961
- Running time: 197 minutes
- Country: India
- Language: Tamil

Kappalottiya Thamizhan (transl. The Tamilian who launched a ship) is a 1961 Indian Tamil-language historical drama film produced and directed by B. R. Panthulu. The film stars Sivaji Ganesan, Gemini Ganesan and Savitri. It is based on the 1944 book of the same name by M. P. Sivagnanam, a biography of V. O. Chidambaram Pillai who founded the Swadeshi Stream Navigation Company to break the monopoly of the British over maritime trade out of India.

Kappalottiya Thamizhan was released on 7 November 1961. The film received critical acclaim, and won the National Film Award for Best Feature Film in Tamil at the 9th National Film Awards. Though it performed poorly at the box office during its initial release, it fared better after receiving tax exemption during its re-release 1967.

== Plot ==
V. O. Chidambaram Pillai has devoted himself to the cause of India's freedom from the British Empire. Chidambaram, appearing for the peasant Madasami, wins a case filed by an agent of a British proprietor. Chidambaram's father, who represented the agent, sends his son to Thoothukudi lest the British proprietor should give him any trouble. Madasami who accompanies Chidambaram, looks after the latter's salt-pan. At Thoothukudi, Chidambaram meets Subramaniya Siva, a freedom fighter, and works for the Swadeshi movement.

Chidambaram receives a complaint from some of the local merchants that the British Shipping Company had refused to load their goods. Against great odds, Chidambaram starts the National Shipping Company with Indian Capital to free Indian trade from dependence on foreign liners. The company prospers despite attempts by the British Company to sabotage the ship of the Indian firm. Chidambaram incurs the displeasure of the Government by organising a strike for getting the grievances of the local coral mill workers redressed and by organising public celebrations to mark the release of Bipin Chandra Pal in contravention of a prohibitory order.

Chidambaram, along with Siva, is invited to Tirunelveli by the District Collector, Winch. The collector directs them not to engage in political activity and also orders them out of the District. They defy the orders and are arrested. In the trial which ensues, Chidambaram is sentenced to 20 years life imprisonment and Siva to 10 years. Chidambaram's sentence is reduced to six years on appeal. The imprisonment of these two leaders sparks off mass unrest which is put down ruthlessly. Some time later, the new District Collector Ashe is shot dead by a patriotic Vanchinathan, who commits suicide before the police can arrest him.

The news of the ongoing independence movement outside provides encouragement to Chidambaram and Siva who are subjected to harsh treatment in prison. Chidambaram is released from prison in poor condition and faces several setbacks – Chidambaram's brother has developed mental illness, Siva has contracted leprosy during his imprisonment, Chidambaram's role in the Indian independence movement is no longer widely recognized , the National Shipping Company is bought by its British rival and leaders like Bal Gangadhar Tilak and Bharathiyar die one after another. Chidambaram devotes the last years of his life to the study of literature and dies still dreaming of the day when India would be free.

== Cast ==
Male cast

- Sivaji Ganesan as V. O. Chidambaram Pillai
- Gemini Ganesan as Madasami
- T. K. Shanmugam as Subramaniya Siva
- S. V. Subbaiah as Bharathiyar
- Balaji as Vanchinathan
- Nagayya as Ulaganathan Pillai
- T. S. Durairaj as Sangan
- Karunanidhi as Mannarsami
- M. N. Kannappa as Meenakshisundaram
- M. R. Santhanam as Aid Ekambaram
- T. N. Sivathanu as Vanchi's father-in-law
- Veerasami as a lawyer
- Eswaran as Neelakanta Brahmachari
- K. V. Srinivasan as Shankara Krishna Iyer
- Parthiban as Judge Pinhe
- Natarajan as Pandit Durai Thevar
- S. A. Kannan as Salem Vijayaraghavachariar
- Nannu as Fakir Muhammed Seth
- Sayeeram as Sakshi Dharmanayagam Pillai
- Master Thyagarajan as a blind boy

Female cast

- Savithri as Kannamma
- Kumari Rukmani as V. O. C.'s wife, Meenakshi Ammal
- Gemini Chandra as Vanchi's wife, Ponnammal
- T. P. Muthulakshmi as (Sudhandira Devi) Singamma
- S. R. Janaki as Madasami's mother
- Saraswathi as Iyengar's wife
- Sasikala as Bharathiyar's wife, Chellammal
- Radhabhai as Paramayi Ammal

Guest artists

- S. V. Ranga Rao as Winch
- Ashokan as Ashe
- K. Sarangapani as Rayar
- O. A. K. Thevar as Vaduguraman
- Stunt Somu as Sudalai

Supporting cast

- Karikol Raju, Thangaraju, M. S. Karuppaiah, Mani Iyer, Vijayakumar, Kuppusami, V. P. S. Mani, Somanathan, S. A. G. Sami, Harihara Iyer, T. P. Harisingh, Gopraj,
  V. Mahalingam, Balakrishnan, Natarajan, Raja, Subbaiah, Ramkumar, Ibrahim, Thoothukudi Arunachalam Kuzhavinar, Master Krishna, Seetharaman and Baby Pappi.

== Production ==
On 14 January 1960, Kappalottiya Thamizhan, a biopic of V. O. Chidambaram Pillai, was announced, to be produced and directed by B. R. Panthulu under Padmini Pictures. The film is based on the 1944 book of the same name by M. P. Sivagnanam, a biography of Chidambaram Pillai. During a time when the DMK was gaining political ground in Tamil Nadu, a time when there was competition between parties, and films were pitched against each other, the opposition unleashed a malicious propaganda that since Chidambaram belonged to the Indian National Congress, Kappalottiya Thamizhan was a film for the Congress. Certain people did not want the masses to be "stirred" by the nationalist spirit.

Sivaji Ganesan was hesitant to do the role of Chidambaram Pillai as he doubted whether he could perform the role flawlessly, but later accepted and studied various material to understand Chidambaram Pillai. B. Saroja Devi was initially cast as Kannamma when the film was launched in 1960 and had even shot a few scenes. Some promotional material featuring her stills had also been published. However, after the production was temporarily shelved and resumed in 1961, she was unable to accommodate the film due to prior scheduling commitments and had to opt out. Savitri subsequently replaced her in the role. S. V. Subbaiah was cast as the poet Subramania Bharati alias Bharathiyar, taking inspiration from his role as Kavi Anandar from the play Kaviyin Kanavu (1945). V. Nagayya who was then in "dire straits", was signed up for a significant role, that of Ulaganathan Pillai, as Panthulu wanted to give him a "break in films".

According to historian S. Theodore Baskaran, there is no evidence of any research undertaken for making the film. He stated that the film had no props, apart from the character's costumes and the female characters' ear-lobes, which were done to create a "period effect". Though then known for his theatrical-style acting, Ganesan tried acting naturally during the prison sequences and his character's trauma of disillusionment. While primarily in black and white, the film was partly coloured using Gevacolor, and the colour sequences were processed at the Film Centre, Mumbai.

== Soundtrack ==
The soundtrack of the film was composed by G. Ramanathan. All the songs are based on poems, written by Subramania Bharati.

Song	Singers	Length
"Chinnakkuzhandaigal"	P. Susheela	02:39
"Endru Thaniyum Indha"	Thiruchi Loganathan	02:18
"Kaatru Veliyidai Kannamma"	P. B. Sreenivas, P. Susheela	03:43
"Nenjil Uramumindri"	Sirkazhi Govindarajan	02:11
"Odi Vilaiyadu Paappa"	Sirkazhi Govindarajan, V. T. Rajagopalan, K. Jamuna Rani, Rohini	03:41
"Paarukkullae Nalla Naadu"	Sirkazhi Govindarajan	02:39
"Thanneer Vittom"	Thiruchi Loganathan	03:07
"Vandhae Maatharam Enbom"	Sirkazhi Govindarajan	02:44
"Vellippani Malai"	Sirkazhi Govindarajan, Thiruchi Loganathan	03:42
"Endru Thaniyum Indha"	P. Leela	02:18
"Unavu Sellavillai Sagiyee"	L. R. Eswari, K. Jamuna Rani	03:18

== Release ==
Kappalottiya Thamizhan was released on 7 November 1961, and failed commercially, losing ₹7 lakh (worth ₹29 crore in 2021 prices). Tax exemption was offered during its re-release in 1967, making it the first Tamil film to get tax exemption from the government of India. About the film's initial failure, Ganesan felt that since the Congress did not understand artistic sensitivities, Kappalottiya Tamizhan was a failure. He also stated that he was not upset for losing money making the film to kindle the national spirit, but rather happy that he could harness the medium to remind people of the Indian freedom fighters of the bygone era. At the 9th National Film Awards, Kappalottiya Thamizhan won the National Film Award for Best Feature Film in Tamil.

== Critical reception ==
The magazines Kalai and Thendral gave the film positive reviews, saying every Tamilian should see it. Kalki praised Krishnaswamy's writing, and compared the film favourably to Veerapandiya Kattabomman (1959), another biopic also directed by Panthulu and starring Ganesan. On Ganesan's performance, Chidambaram's son Subramaniam said it was like seeing his father alive on the screen, a statement Ganesan considered his "highest award". Following Ganesan's death in 2001, S. Viswanathan of The Frontline said, "Critics list several films as his best in terms of performance. However, according to the Ganesan, his career best was Kappalottiya Thamizhan."

== Bibliography ==
- Baskaran, S. Theodore (1996). The Eye of the Serpent: An Introduction to Tamil Cinema. Chennai: East West Books. OCLC 243920437.
- Dhananjayan, G. (2014). Pride of Tamil Cinema: 1931–2013. Blue Ocean Publishers. OCLC 898765509.
- Ganesan, Sivaji; Narayanaswamy, T. S. (2007) [2002]. Autobiography of an Actor. Chennai: Sivaji Prabhu Charities Trust. OCLC 297212002.
- Rajadhyaksha, Ashish; Willemen, Paul (1998) [1994]. Encyclopaedia of Indian Cinema. British Film Institute and Oxford University Press. ISBN 0-19-563579-5.
