= Panchalankurichi Fort =

Coordinates: 8.9340°N 78.0336°E

Panchalankurichi Fort was a fort once ruled by the polygar Veerapandiya Kattabomman. It was located in what is now the state of Tamil Nadu in India.

== History ==
This fort was under the rule of Veerapandiya Kattabomman and was annexed by the British and demolished by Major J. Bannerman. Later Kattabomman was betrayed by Vijaya Raghunatha Tondaiman and handed over to the British. He was hanged at Kayatharu on 16 October 1799.

== Present fort ==
The present Panchalankurichi Fort is a rebuilt fort left as a memorial of Kattabomman in 1974 by the Government of Tamilnadu.
