= Veerapandiya Kattabomman (film) =

1959 film by B. R. Panthulu

- Theatrical release poster
- Directed by: B. R. Panthulu
- Screenplay by: Sakthi T. K. Krishnasamy
- Based on: Veerapandiya Kattabomman (play)
- Produced by: B. R. Panthulu
- Starring: Sivaji Ganesan; Gemini Ganesan; Padmini; S. Varalakshmi; Ragini
- Cinematography: W. R. Subbarao
- Edited by: R. Devarajan
- Music by: G. Ramanathan
- Production company: Padmini Pictures
- Distributed by: Sivaji Films
- Release dates: 10 May 1959 (London); 16 May 1959 (Tamil Nadu)
- Running time: 201 minutes
- Country: India
- Language: Tamil

Veerapandiya Kattabomman (transl. Kattabomman, the Brave Warrior) is a 1959 Indian Tamil-language historical war film produced and directed by B. R. Panthulu. The film stars Sivaji Ganesan, Gemini Ganesan, Padmini, S. Varalakshmi, and Ragini, with V. K. Ramasamy and Javar Seetharaman in supporting roles. Its soundtrack and score were composed by G. Ramanathan.

The film is loosely based on the story of Veerapandiya Kattabomman, an 18th-century king who rebelled against the East India Company. It was an adaptation of the play of the same name by Sakthi T. K. Krishnasamy which featured Sivaji Ganesan as the title character, and premiered in August 1957. Principal photography began in October the same year, and took place mainly in Jaipur and Madras (now Chennai) until late 1958. This was the first full-length Tamil film released in Technicolor.

Veerapandiya Kattabomman premiered in London on 10 May 1959, and was released in Tamil Nadu six days later. It was critically acclaimed; Sivaji Ganesan's performance as Kattabomman received widespread praise, although some film scholars considered elements in the film, particularly the portrayal of the title character, to be historically inaccurate. It was a commercial success, running for over 25 weeks in theatres and becoming a silver jubilee film.

Veerapandiya Kattabomman was the first in Tamil cinema to receive international awards for Best Film, Best Actor, and Best Music Director at the 1960 Afro-Asian Film Festival in Cairo, and received a Certificate of Merit as part of the National Film Award for Best Feature Film in Tamil. Veerapandiya Kattabomman was re-released in 1984, and a digitally-restored version was released on 21 August 2015; both were commercially successful.

== Plot ==
Veerapandiya Kattabomman, the chieftain of Panchalankurichi, is a brave warrior. On receiving news of a robbery in his territory, he and his retinue set out incognito to capture the robbers. When captured, the robbers confess that they had been hired by the British to create unrest in Kattabomman's domain; the British had enticed the neighbouring chieftain, Ettappan, to help them annexe Panchalankurichi.

Vellaiyammal, who lives in Chayalkudi, a village near Panchalankurichi, vows to marry the man who tames her pet bull. She brings her bull to Panchalankurichi for participating in a jallikattu game sponsored by Kattabomman. All those who attempt to tame the bull fail until Vellaiyathevan, Kattabomman's commander-in-chief, subdues the bull and wins Vellaiyammal's love. Kattabomman later learns of their love, and encourages them to marry.

The king receives a message from W. C. Jackson, the tax collector for Tirunelveli, which demands a meeting with him at Ramanathapuram to discuss payment. Captain Davison, Kattabomman's British friend, advises him to see Jackson. Jackson, learning that Kattabomman has come with his troops, demands to meet him alone. At the meeting, Jackson insults him and orders him arrested. Surrounded by British troops, Kattabomman fights and escapes; however, his minister Thanapathi Sivasubramaniam Pillai is captured.

Some time later, Pillai is released and brings news that Jackson has been sent back to England at Davison's recommendation. A British messenger sent to Kattabomman's court by Colonel S. R. Lushington, Tirunelveli's new revenue collector reports that Pillai and his men have looted their granaries and killed their men at Srivaikuntam. Pillai justifies his act, saying that he instructed his men to do it because of the famine in their kingdom. Ashamed of Pillai's action, Kattabomman accuses him of theft and murder. Pillai apologises and offers himself as a prisoner to the British, but Kattabomman refuses to hand him over; instead, he offers money to compensate for the looted rice. Lushington refuses the compensation and, with Major Bannerman's and Ettappan's help, incites the neighbouring rulers to attack Kattabomman. Bannerman is placed in charge of the British troops; he and Ettappan plan to attack Panchalankurichi when the people are attending a festival in Tiruchendur. Kattabomman's spy Sundaralingam informs the king, who prepares for war.

On the day of the battle, Vellaiyammal begs Vellaiyathevan not to go because she had a nightmare full of evil omens the previous night. Ignoring her entreaties, Vellaiyathevan sets out and is killed in the ensuing battle. When she learns of her husband's death, Vellaiyammal avenges him by killing the man who killed him. She finds Vellaiyathevan's body and, overcome by grief, falls dead across it. Bannerman's troops attack Panchalankurichi with heavy artillery, and Kattabomman's army suffers. The king, wounded in the neck, is saved by his brother Oomaithurai. Sensing that the fort cannot survive another cannon barrage, Kattabomman and Oomaithurai flee to the adjoining kingdom of Kovilpatti. Pillai, disguising himself as Kattabomman, decoys the British soldiers who are on the king's trail. From Kovilpatti, Kattabomman and Oomaithurai flee to Pudukkottai. Thondaimaan, the king of Pudukkottai, is ordered by the British to capture Kattabomman and Oomaithurai. Fearing the British, Thondaimaan captures them and hands them over. While Oomaithurai is jailed, Kattabomman is tried by the British and hanged.

== Cast ==
Note: Listing as per the film's opening credits.

- Sivaji Ganesan as Kattabomman
- Gemini Ganesan as Vellaiyadhevan
- Padmini as Vellaiyammal
- S. Varalakshmi as Jakkammal
- Ragini as Sundaravadivu
- V. K. Ramasamy as Ettappa Nayagar
- Javar Seetharaman as Bannerman
- O. A. K. Thevar as Oomaithurai
- M. R. Santhanam as Dhanapathi Subramania Pillai
- V. R. Rajagopal as Kariyappan
- A. Karunanidhi as Sundaralingam
- Pakkirisami as Ponnan

- Chinaiah as Adappakkaran
- Stunt Somu as Gopal Iyer
- K. V. Seenivasan as Dubash Ramalinga Mudaliar
- Anandan as Duraisingam
- Natarajan as Colonel Maxwell
- S. A. Kannan as Captain Davison
- Parthiban as W. C. Jackson
- Krishnasami as Alan
- Kannan as Governor
- Muthulakshmi as Kamakshi
- Tambaram Lalitha as Valli
- Baby Kanchana as Baby Meena

== Production ==
=== Origin ===
Since childhood, Sivaji Ganesan dreamt of playing the resistance fighter Veerapandiya Kattabomman; he had left home at age seven to fulfill his dream. Several years later, while Ganesan and writer Sakthi T. K. Krishnasamy (Note: Sivaji Ganesan had been on the payroll of a theatre group, owned by Sakthi T. K. Krishnasamy, named Sakthi Nataka Sabha. Krishnasamy had encouraged Sivaji Ganesan in his early days on the stage.) were travelling through Kayatharu, where Kattabomman was hanged, Ganesan expressed a desire to produce a play based on Kattabomman's life; his first exposure to acting was when he saw Kambalaththaar Kooththu, a street play about Kattabomman's life. Krishnasamy immediately agreed, and began to write a script. Krishnasamy completed writing the script within a month. Krishnasamy's play, Veerapandiya Kattabomman, premiered in Salem in late August 1957 and was performed by Ganesan's troupe, Sivaji Nataka Mandram. He had invested nearly ₹50,000 (Note: The exchange rate in 1958 was 4.79 Indian rupees (₹) to one dollar (US$).) for sets and costumes. When he saw the play, director B. R. Panthulu decided to adapt it as a feature film. Panthulu produced the film version (also entitled Veerapandiya Kattabomman) with his company, Padmini Pictures. G. Dharmarajan, the play's set designer, was also assigned the same crew position for the film. W. R. Subbarao was signed as cinematographer, and R. Devarajan as editor. The screenplay was credited to a "history research team", headed by M. P. Sivagnanam and consisting of Krishnasamy, Panthulu, Sivaji Ganesan, P. A. Kumar and Singamuthu.

Before Ganesan and Panthulu, there were two unsuccessful attempts to make a film on Kattabomman: in July 1948, Selvam Pictures announced its intention to produce Kattabommu (the rebel's real name), which would star P. U. Chinnappa. The other attempt was made by producer S. S. Vasan of Gemini Studios; a promotional poster for the project, entitled Kattabomman, was released on 5 November 1953. A notice from Gemini, inviting anyone with useful information about Kattabomman and his exploits to send it to the studio's storyboard department, was published three days later in the magazine Ananda Vikatan. According to a 1957 article by Singapore-based Indian Movie News, when Ganesan heard about Vasan's attempt to make a film about Kattabomman, he asked him to abandon the project; Vasan agreed, and lent Ganesan important research material on Kattabomman. Film historian Randor Guy contradicted this in his 1997 book, Starlight, Starbright: The Early Tamil Cinema, saying that writers like Kothamangalam Subbu and Veppathur Kittoo were hired by Vasan to research Kattabomman's life, and Vasan believed that Ganesan, who had become popular after Parasakthi (1952), was the only eligible choice to portray Kattabomman. Guy noted that Ganesan hesitated to work with Vasan, since he was earlier rejected for a role in Chandralekha (1948), leading to Vasan dropping the project. Despite this, Ganesan later appeared in Vasan's later ventures, Irumbu Thirai (1960) and Motor Sundaram Pillai (1966).

=== Casting and filming ===
Ganesan originally offered the role of Vellaiyathevan to S. S. Rajendran, who declined due to his commitment to Sivagangai Seemai. He later asked actress Savitri to ask her husband, Gemini Ganesan, to play the role. Gemini was initially reluctant to accept the part, feeling it was "improper" to replace Rajendran. After Rajendran wrote to Panthulu that he had no objection to Gemini playing Vellaiyathevan, however, the actor agreed. S. Varalakshmi, in addition to playing Kattabomman's wife, Jakkamma, also was a playback singer. Kattabomman's daughter in the film, Meena (Baby Kanchana), was a fictional character created by Krishnasamy. Meena was based on Krishnasamy's daughter, Mynavathi, who died when she was five years old. Krishnasamy initially refused to include the scene of Meena's death since it reminded him of his daughter, but finally did reluctantly.

Veerapandiya Kattabomman was launched at Annai Illam, Sivaji Ganesan's home. Principal photography began in October 1957 with a puja. During filming at Bharani Studios, Madras (now Chennai) in 1958, Adoor Gopalakrishnan (who watched the shoot one afternoon) remembered the actors rushing outside after every take because of the intense heat on set: "The speed of the film was so low those days that one needed many, many lights for correct exposure." Filming also took place prominently in Jaipur. With the aid of Janakaraja (who was in charge of the cavalry division), the production unit hired junior artistes to play cavalry soldiers in the battle scenes. This was where the final filming schedule took place, and principal photography ended in the same year, around late November to early December.

Veerapandiya Kattabomman was the first full-length Tamil film released in Technicolor; it was shot in Gevacolor and then converted into Technicolor in London. Panthulu adopted the American director Cecil B. DeMille's practise of introducing the film on-camera. The film's final length was 18,086 feet (5,513 m).

== Music ==
The soundtrack album was composed by G. Ramanathan, with lyrics by Ku. Ma. Balasubramaniam. Its songs range from "folksy to light to classical". The soundtrack was a career breakthrough for struggling playback singer P. B. Sreenivas, who was recruited by Ramanathan to sing the duet "Inbam Pongum Vennila", with P. Susheela. Some of the songs are set in Carnatic ragas; "Pogaathe Pogaathe" is set in Mukhari, "Manam Kanintharul" in Kurinji, and "Singara Kanne" in Brindavanasaranga. Stage actor K. B. Chellamuthu was the songs' violinist. A remix of "Inbam Pongum Vennila" was recorded by Hiphop Tamizha for the 2015 film, Aambala.

All lyrics are written by Ku. Ma. Balasubramaniam.

No.	Title	Singer(s)	Length
1.	"Inbam Pongum Vennila"	P. B. Sreenivas, P. Susheela	4:42
2.	"Maattuvandi Pootikittu"	T. M. Soundararajan, T. V. Rathnam	2:53
3.	"Seermevum"	Chorus	0:42
4.	"Anjatha Singam"	P. Susheela	3:26
5.	"Aathukkulle"	Thiruchi Loganathan, K. Jamuna Rani, V. T. Rajagopalan, A. G. Rathnamala	3:14
6.	"Singara Kanne"	S. Varalakshmi	3:10
7.	"Karantha Palaiyum"	T. M. Soundararajan	2:45
8.	"Takku Takku"	P. Susheela, S. Varalakshmi, A. P. Komala	3:23
9.	"Manam Kanintharul (Vetrivadivelane)"	V. N. Sundaram, S. Varalakshmi	3:21
10.	"Jakkamma"	Sirkazhi Govindarajan	3:16
11.	"Veerathin Chinname"	Sirkazhi Govindarajan	1:04
12.	"Pogaathe Pogaathe"	A. G. Rathnamala	2:40
Total length:			34:36

== Release and reception ==
Veerapandiya Kattabomman premiered in London on 10 May 1959, and was released in Tamil Nadu six days later. It was previously scheduled for April. The film received positive reviews when it was released. Ananda Vikatan, in its 24 May 1959 review, praised Sivaji Ganesan's performance and said that the film would make Tamils proud. Kanthan of Kalki lauded Panthulu's direction and the cast performances. Distributed by Sivaji Films in Madras, the film was a commercial success, running for over 25 weeks in theatres, becoming a silver jubilee film. (Note: A Silver Jubilee film is one that completes a theatrical run of 25 weeks or 175 days.)

== Accolades ==
At the Afro-Asian Film Festival held from 29 February to 11 March 1960 at Cairo, Ganesan won the Best Actor award; this made him the first Indian actor to receive an international award. When Ganesan returned to Madras, South Indian Actors Guild president M. G. Ramachandran organised a large welcome reception for him. Ganesan wrote in his autobiography that at the festival, "I was called on stage and I went up a diminutive, five-foot nothing, looking boyish with my build, whereas they had expected me to be a colossus, on seeing [Veerapandiya] Kattabomman, at least seven or eight feet tall! Irrespective of this they gave me a standing ovation for five minutes."

Event	Date	Category	Recipient	Ref.
7th National Film Awards	1 May 1960	National Film Award for Best Feature Film in Tamil	B. R. Panthulu	
Afro-Asian Film Festival	11 March 1960	Best Actor	Sivaji Ganesan	
Afro-Asian Film Festival	11 March 1960	Best Music Director	G. Ramanathan	
Afro-Asian Film Festival	11 March 1960	Best Foreign Film	B. R. Panthulu	

== Historical accuracy ==
Veerapandiya Kattabomman's historical inaccuracies have been criticised. Guy reported in 2015 that a Tamil weekly said, "[...] a new face called Kattabomman acted brilliantly as Sivaji Ganesan!" (Note: Guy refused to reveal the name of the weekly.) According to poet Kannadasan, Kattabomman was not a freedom fighter but a thief; the Maruthu Pandiyars were the real freedom fighters, and he wrote a script about them which was adapted into Sivagangai Seemai. Kannadasan's assertion was supported by writer Tamilvanan, who criticised Kattabomman's glorification. In the 1990s, when politician Vaiko asked Ganesan if he or the writer had researched Kattabomman, with respect to his walking style, Ganesan admitted that they did not, saying, "In my mind, that's how I imagined the character. That was the walk of the hero."

In Starlight, Starbright: The Early Tamil Cinema Guy noted that according to East India Company records, Kattabomman was of Telugu ancestry and a strong, silent man, without the film's dash and daring. According to Guy, Ganesan portrayed Kattabomman as a "larger-than-life-character, haranguing audiences in a high-flown Tamil replete with literary flourishes"; the real Kattabomman was not fluent in Tamil. Ashish Rajadhyaksha and Paul Willemen in Encyclopedia of Indian Cinema says, "A love interest has been added as well", implying that the character of Vellaiyammal (Padmini) was fictional. Film historian S. Krishnaswamy, writing for The Hindu in 2001, noted that the film was "historically far from accurate" and "more like a costume drama or a mythological".

In the 2010 book, Cinemas of South India: Culture, Resistance, Ideology, Elavarthi Sathya Prakash says about Kattabomman's Telugu identity: "While National historiography tries to elevate him, some versions of Tamil history seem to downgrade him". S. Theodore Baskaran said the following year, "Tamil films have scant regard for history. Almost always, they confuse between history and folklore ... Kattabomman was not even a king. His arsenal had just about three to four guns." University of Madras department head Ramu Manivannan told The Times of India in 2014, "The popular images of [historical] characters have been constructed from oral descriptions and accounts. In some cases, the popular image overtakes the historical one as in the case of Sivaji Ganesan's portrayal of Kattabomman on the screen."

== Legacy ==
The scene where Kattabomman and Jackson confront each other attained popularity.

Veerapandiya Kattabomman achieved cult status in Tamil cinema. It was a landmark film in Ganesan's career, and Tamil people identified Kattabomman with him. N. Sathiya Moorthy wrote for Rediff.com in 2001, "[Ganesan's] portrayal of Lord Shiva in [Thiruvilaiyadal] and of freedom-fighters Veerapandia Kattabomman and Kappalottia Thamizhan V O Chidambaram have become symbolic of the very characters in the average Tamil mind across the world." The film was a trendsetter in Tamil cinema, and a benchmark of dialogue delivery. Its success encouraged many in Tamil cinema to make films based on freedom fighters and historical figures, notably Kappalottiya Thamizhan (1961) and Bharathi (2000). The film's jallikattu scene attained popularity. The term "Ettappan" later entered Tamil vernacular as a slang word meaning a traitor, because of the scene where Kattabomman accuses the character of treachery.

In 1970, eleven years after Veerapandiya Kattabomman's release, Ganesan erected a statue of Kattabomman in Kayatharu (where the rebel was hanged). During a February 2009 visit to Sri Lanka, Bharatiya Janata Party leader L. K. Advani said: "I have seen the Tamil movie of [Veerapandiya Kattabomman], acted by [Sivaji] Ganesan, many times. It is fresh in my memory." A postal cover, designed by film historian and actor Mohan Raman, was released on 16 May 2009 by the Sivaji–Prabhu Charities trust and the Indo-Russian Cultural and Friendship Society to celebrate the 50th anniversary of the film's release. Politician Venkaiah Naidu said in 2016 that he became a fan of Sivaji Ganesan after watching his performance in the film.

A. V. Ashok wrote for The Hindu, "It is no exaggeration to say that Sivaji's heroic outpouring as Veerapandiya Kattabomman is an integral part of the Tamil cultural psyche." According to the actor Sivakumar, "You can't reproduce movies like Parasakthi, Pasamalar, Devadas, Veerapandiya Kattabomman or Ratha Kanneer [...] By remaking such films, you are lowering yourself, while it enhances the original artists’ image." An elephant presented by Ganesan to the Punnainallur Mariamman Temple in 1960 was named "Vellaiyammal" (after Padmini's character), and was later donated to the Brihadisvara Temple, Thanjavur in 1980. According to Sri Lankan Canadian journalist D. B. S. Jeyaraj, Veerapandiya Kattabomman was the first Tamil film that had a great impact on him; the film's success "was the powerful delivery of fiery dialogue by the film hero Kattabomman played by Sivaji."

Ganesan's line "Vari, vatti, kisthi ... Yaarai ketkirai vari ... Etharkku ketkirai vari. Vaanam polikirathu, bhumi vilaigirathu, unakken katta vendum vari ... " (roughly translated "Tribute, tax, loan, interest. The rains pour from the sky, the land blossoms, why should I offer you money?"), from a scene with W. C. Jackson (C. R. Parthiban), was ranked eighth on Outlook's 20 October 2008 list of 13 Cheesiest, Chalkiest Lines in Indian Cinema. In April 2012, Rediff.com included the film on its A to Z of Tamil Cinema list. In a January 2015 interview with The Times of India, playwright Y. G. Mahendran said: "Most character artists today lack variety [...] Show me one actor in India currently who can do a Kattabomman, a VOC, a Vietnam Veedu, a Galatta Kalyanam and a Thiruvilayadal." Actor Rana Daggubati, in an interview with Sangeetha Devi Dundoo of The Hindu, said that Ganesan's performances as Kattabomman and Karna (in the 1964 film Karnan) influenced his role in Baahubali (2015). The scene between Ganesan and Parthiban was featured in the 2016 film, Jackson Durai, which was named after Parthiban's character. M. Sasikumar's Balle Vellaiyathevaa, also released that year, was named after a line spoken by Ganesan's character.

== Re-releases ==
The film was re-released in 1984 during M. G. Ramachandran's tenure as Chief Minister of Tamil Nadu. Granted tax exemption by the state government, it was again commercially successful and ran for 30 weeks in theatres. In 2012, after the commercial success of Karnan's digital re-release, Raj Television Network announced that they would re-release Veerapandiya Kattabomman in 3D in early 2013; however, that did not happen.

In March 2015, Raj Television Network announced that they would release a digital 5.1 surround sound version of the film in collaboration with Sai Ganesh Films the following month; it was released on 21 August of that year. Murali B. V., coordinator of Sai Ganesh Films (which helped restore and digitise the film's original prints), told The New Indian Express that it took nine months to clean and restore the original 35 mm film (with monaural sound) for digitisation. A reviewer for The Times of India criticised the digitised version, noting that the colour "seemed to have been leached [from] the frames" and the sound system was "a bit contemporary." Despite its technical issues, however, "the film still retains its dramatic force". Likewise, film critic Baradwaj Rangan wrote, "The picture quality – the colours, mainly – is a bit inconsistent. But this may be due to problems with the negative, and it doesn't affect the three-hour film at all – save for the war portions where we wait for the inevitable, it all just zips by." The digitised version was a commercial success.

== Bibliography ==
- Bhaskaran, Gautaman (2010). Adoor Gopalakrishnan: A Life in Cinema. India: Penguin Books. ISBN 978-0-670-08171-4.
- Dechamma C. C., Sowmya; Prakash, Elavarthi Sathya (2010). Cinemas of South India: Culture, Resistance, and Ideology. Oxford University Press. ISBN 978-0-19-806795-5.
- Ganesan, Sivaji; Narayana Swamy, T. S. (2007) [2002]. Autobiography of an Actor: Sivaji Ganesan, October 1928 – July 2001. Chennai: Sivaji Prabhu Charities Trust. OCLC 297212002.
- Guy, Randor (1997). Starlight, Starbright: The Early Tamil Cinema. Chennai: Amra Publishers. OCLC 52794531.
- Rajadhyaksha, Ashish; Willemen, Paul (1998) [1994]. Encyclopaedia of Indian Cinema. British Film Institute and Oxford University Press. ISBN 0-19-563579-5.
- Veeravalli, Shrikanth (2013). MGR: A Biography. Rupa Publications. ISBN 978-8-1291-3228-4.
