= Chinna Ponnusamy Padayatchi =

Indian stage actor, playwright, dancer and teacher

Chinna Ponnusamy Padayatchi was an Indian stage actor, playwright, dancer and teacher of theatrical arts. Notable among his students was Shivaji Ganesan.

== Early life ==
Padayatchi was born in Chidambaram in Tamil Nadu.

== Acclaim ==
Shivaji Ganesan, one of his notable students in theatrical arts said "My teacher (Chinna Ponniswamy Padayachi of Chidambaram) taught me Bharatnatyam, acting, body movements... Practically everything. Padayachi, was himself an outstanding stage actor. And he learnt in an atmosphere that was reminiscent of an ashram school."
