= Sivaji Ganesan =

Indian actor and film producer (1928–2001)

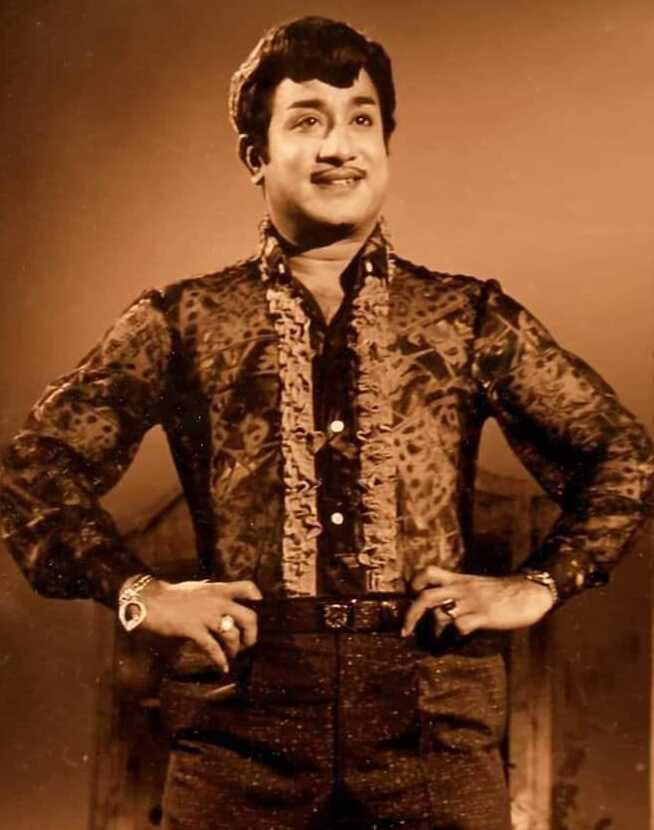
- Sivaji Ganesan's portrait from Deiva Magan (1969)
- Born: Vettaithidal Chinnaiya Manrayar Ganesamoorthy; 1 October 1928; Soorakkottai, Madras Presidency, British India
- Died: 21 July 2001 (aged 72); Chennai, Tamil Nadu, India
- Other names: Nadigar Thilagam; Simma Kuralon
- Occupations: Actor; film producer; politician
- Years active: 1951–1999
- Works: Full list
- Political party: Tamizhaga Munnetra Munnani (1988–1989)
- Other political affiliations: Dravidar Kazhagam (1945–1949); Dravida Munnetra Kazhagam (1949–1956); Independent politician (1956–1961), (1993–2001); Tamil National Party (1961–1964); Indian National Congress (1964–1969), (1977–1988); Congress (O) (1969–1976); Congress (R) (1976–1977); Janata Dal (1989–1993)
- Spouse: Kamala (m. 1952)
- Children: 4, including Ramkumar and Prabhu
- Parent(s): Father : Chinnaiya Manrayar; Mother : Rajamani Ammal
- Relatives: Dushyanth Ramkumar (grandson); Vikram Prabhu (grandson); Shivaji Dev (grandson)
- Awards: Kalaimamani (1962); Padma Shri (1966); Padma Bhushan (1984); Honorary doctorate (1986); Ordre des Arts et des Lettres (Chevalier) (1995); Dada Saheb Phalke Award (1996); NTR National Award (1998)

Member of Parliament, Rajya Sabha
- In office 14 February 1982 – 2 April 1986
- Constituency: Tamil Nadu

Vettaithidal (Note: Although the V. is widely considered to stand for Villupuram, Ganesan's son Ramkumar says it stands for Vettaithidal, their ancestral village.) Chinnaiya Manrayar Ganesamoorthy (1 October 1928 – 21 July 2001), better known by his stage name Sivaji Ganesan, was an Indian actor, film producer and politician. He was mainly active in Tamil cinema and theatre during the latter half of the 20th century. Sivaji Ganesan is acknowledged as one of the greatest Indian actors of all time and among the most imitated one by other actors. He was known for his versatility and the variety of roles he depicted on screen, which also gave him the Tamil nickname Nadigar Thilagam (transl. the pride of actors). In a nearly five-decade career, he acted in 288 Tamil, Telugu, Malayalam, Kannada, and Hindi films. He is the only actor in Tamil cinema to have played the lead role in over 250 films.

Ganesan was the first Indian actor to win the "Best Actor" award at an international film festival, at the Afro-Asian Film Festival held in Cairo, Egypt in 1960. Many leading South Indian actors have stated that their acting was influenced by Ganesan. In 1997, Ganesan was conferred the Dadasaheb Phalke Award, the highest honour for films in India. He was also the first Indian actor to be made a Chevalier of the Ordre des Arts et des Lettres. In addition, he received National Film Award (Special Jury), four Filmfare Awards South and three Tamil Nadu State Film Awards.

Ganesan is remembered as an iconic figure of Tamil cinema. Upon his death, the Los Angeles Times described him as "the Marlon Brando of South India's film industry".

In his career, he mostly paired with K.R. Vijaya, Padmini, Savitri, B. Sarojadevi, P. Bhanumathi and also worked alongside several writers and co-stars who later became Chief Ministers: C.N. Annadurai, M. Karunanidhi, MGR, NTR, J. Jayalalithaa, and Vijay.

== Early life ==
Ganesan was born on 1 October 1928, as the fourth son of Chinnaiya Manrayar and Rajamani Ammal in Vettaithidal, India in a Kallar (Thevar) family. Early in his career, Ganesan acted under the name V. C. Ganesan. Media outlets said that the initial 'V' stood for Villupuram, though one of Ganesan's sons stated that it stood for Vettaithidal, the village their family originates from. Without his father's consent, Ganesan decided to join a touring stage drama company at the age of seven. At the age of 10, he moved to Tiruchirappalli and joined a drama troupe in Sangiliyandapuram and began to perform in stage plays. He was fortunate enough to learn acting and dancing from the drama troupe trainers. He was trained in Bharatanatyam, Kathak and Manipuri dance forms.

Ganesan exhibited his ability to remember lengthy lines easily. The group favoured Ganesan to play the lead and he would continue to do so. His portrayal of Shivaji I in the stage play Shivaji Kanda Hindu Rajyam written by C. N. Annadurai earned him the moniker "Sivaji", which was conferred on him at a public function presided over by social reformer Periyar. Since then, he has been referred to by the name of "Sivaji".

== Film career ==
=== Early career: 1951–1953 ===
Ganesan lent his voice to Mukkamala Krishna Murthy, a Telugu actor, for the Tamil film Niraparadhi (1951). He made his acting debut in the 1952 Tamil film Parasakthi, which was directed by the Krishnan–Panju duo and co-starred actress Pandari Bai. The film became an instant commercial success, running for over 175 days in several theatres, and ran for over 50 days in all the 62 centres it was released, and at the Sri Lanka–based Mailan Theatre, it ran for nearly 40 weeks. Film distributor P. A. Perumal Mudaliar of National Pictures, with the patronage of A. V. Meiyappan of AVM Productions, bought the film rights of Parasakthi. P.A. Perumal cast Ganesan after being impressed with his performance as Nur Jahan in the Sakthi Nadaga Sabha play of the same name. It was he who, in 1950, gave Ganesan a flight ticket to Madras for the screen test for Parasakthi. Ganesan had simultaneously shot for the Telugu-Tamil bilingual film Paradesi (titled Poongothai in Tamil), which was supposed to be his actual film to release first, but released much later after Perumal requested its co-producer Anjali Devi to let Parasakthi release first, and she agreed.

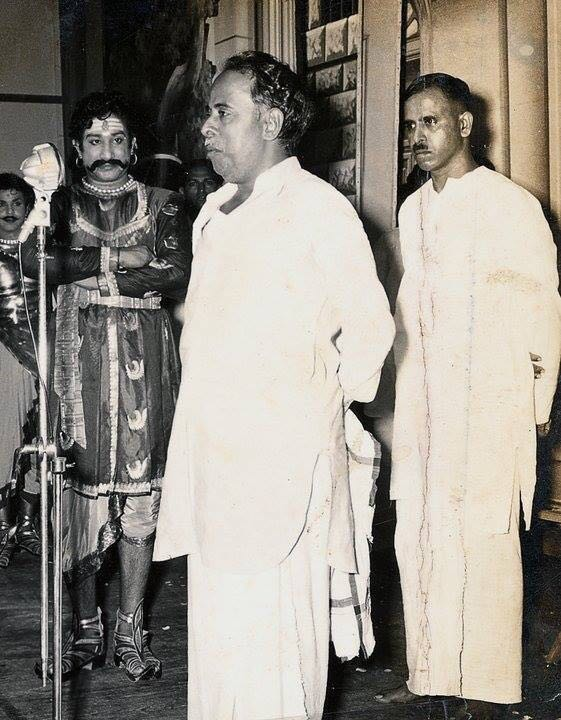
Sivaji Ganesan seen with C. N. Annadurai at a stage drama

Parasakthi did not begin well for Ganesan. When shooting began and 2000 feet of the film was shot, Meiyappan was dissatisfied with Ganesan's "thin" physique, and wanted him replaced with K. R. Ramasamy. Perumal refused, and Ganesan was retained. Meiyappan was also satisfied with the final results of the film. The initial scenes of Ganesan which he earlier disliked were reshot. Ganesan was paid a monthly salary of ₹250 (valued at about US$52.5 in 1952 (Note: The exchange rate between 1948 and 1966 was 4.79 Indian rupees (₹) per 1 US dollar (US$).)) for acting in the film.The script was written by later Chief Minister of Tamil Nadu, M. Karunanidhi. Since actors who are well-trained in classical dance can effectively showcase expressions called Nava Rasa on their faces, Ganesan went on to become one of the popular actors in Tamil cinema in the 1950s. His unique voice had a greater appeal. His style of dialogue delivery with a long spell of dialogues—like a poetry recitation with much clarity—earned him critical recognition.

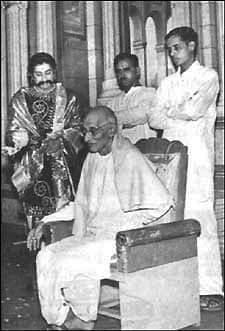
Sivaji Ganesan with Sakthi T. K. Krishnasamy

Two factors can be attributed the entry of Ganesan into films: the principal artists in Tamil films during the 1940s and 1950s were Telugus, whose acting was not matched by their dialogue delivery in Tamil. Secondly, the 1950s saw the growth of the Dravidian movement in Tamil Nadu, under the leadership of C. N. Annadurai, and M. Karunanidhi. Their transformation of language skills to films through script writing ensured their instant acceptance.

=== Donning versatile roles: 1954–1969 ===
Andha Naal (1954) was a trendsetter in Tamil cinema because it had no songs and Ganesan played an anti-hero. The film won the president's silver medal the following year. The same year, he co-starred with his competitor M. G. Ramachandran in Koondukkili, where he played the antagonist.

His role in the film Veerapandiya Kattabomman won him the Best Actor Award at the Afro-Asian Film Festival held in March 1960 at Cairo. Incidentally, Ganesan was also the first Indian actor to get an award for Best Actor abroad. Often considered to be a landmark film in Tamil cinema, Pasamalar is arguably one of the best films of Sivaji Ganesan and Savitri together. Once again directed by A Bhimsingh, the film has established a cult following. When it released in 1961, it became a trendsetter of sorts and was a money spinner at the box-office. Post its release, several films based on a similar theme were made, for example, Mullum Malarum. It also won the National Award that year and was remade in several languages.

Uthama Puthiran is the first film to feature Ganesan in dual roles and the first Indian film to have the shots with zoom technique. Sivaji Ganesan has acted in many Tamil movies co-starring with many popular and talented Tamil actresses of his time. He gave many commercial success films such as Palum Pazhamum, Irumbu Thirai, Padikkadha Medhai, Paava Mannippu, Padithal Mattum Podhuma, Aalayamani, Iruvar Ullam, Annai Illam, Aandavan Kattalai, Kappalottiya Thamizhan, Kai Koduttha Dheivam, Puthiya Paravai and his 100th film, Navarathri whereby Ganesan portrayed nine distinct roles in the film. It is arguably one of Sivaji Ganesan's best films in its tribute to the actor.

He had comedic roles in several movies, such as Kalyanam Panniyum Brahmachari (1954), Sabaash Meena (1958), Ooty Varai Uravu (1967), and Galatta Kalyanam (1968).

His portrayal of Lord Shiva in the movie Thiruvilayadal (1965) won him many accolades. Ganesan could strike a balance between commercial cinema, Mythological cinema and experimental cinema. His epical portrayals in films such as Thiruvilayaadal, Thiruvarutselvar, Saraswati Sabatham, Thirumal Perumai and Thillana Mohanambal won him critical acclaim. He played a variety of roles such as freedom fighters, like V.O. Chidambaram Pillai,Tiruppur Kumaran, Bhagat Singh and epic characters like Karna, Bharatha, Narada, Appar, Nayanmars and Alwars. Spanning genres like epics to Crime thrillers; from romantic escapades to comic flicks and action flicks, Ganesan has covered it all.

=== Superstardom – varied roles: 1970–1979 ===
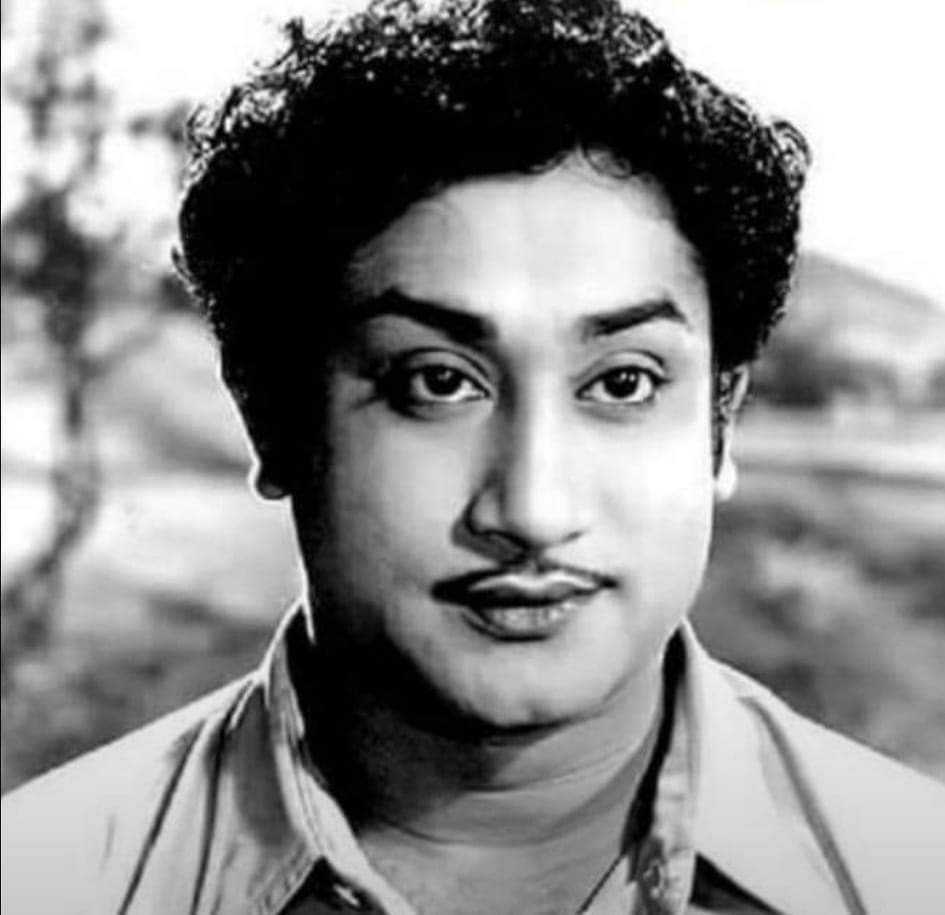
Sivaji Ganesan in 1956

Ganesan played supporting role to Rajendra Kumar in the Hindi film Dharti in 1970, which was a remake of his 1969 Tamil film Sivandha Mann, in which he played the lead role. In the Hindi version, Ganesan played the role which Muthuraman had played in the original. Several directors such as Krishnan–Panju, T. R. Sundaram, T. R. Ramanna, A. P. Nagarajan, L. V. Prasad, B. R. Panthulu, T. Prakash Rao, D. Yoganand, A. Bhim Singh, K. Shankar, C. V. Sridhar, A. C. Tirulokchandar, P. Madhavan, K. S. Gopalakrishnan, Muktha V.Srinivasan, C. V. Rajendran, and K. Vijayan directed Ganesan in different roles. Jaggayya offered his voice to Sivaji when his movies were dubbed into Telugu.

In the 1960s and 1970s his films have been well received and he was able to deliver constant hits. Some of his famous hits during this period are Vasantha Maligai, Gauravam, Thanga Pathakkam and Sathyam. Many of his films inspired remakes in Sinhalese. Films such as Pilot Premnath and Mohana Punnagai were shot in Sri Lanka, with Sri Lankan actors such as Malini Fonseka and Geetha Kumarasinghe playing the female lead. In 1979, he appeared in the biggest blockbuster of his career, Thirisoolam his 200th film, an adaptation of the Kannada film Shankar Guru in which Rajkumar had played the lead role.

=== Later and final career: 1980–1999 ===
Muthal Mariyathai (1985) won him a Filmfare Award under Best Actor – Tamil category. The 1990s was a period in which Ganesan started enacting matured roles. In 1992, he acted with Kamal Haasan in the critically acclaimed Thevar Magan, which won him a Special Mention Award at the 40th National Film Awards. His other films released during this period are Pasumpon, Once More, En Aasai Rasave and Mannavaru Chinnavaru, where he was cast in prominent roles. He acted with Mohanlal in the movie Oru Yathramozhi (1997). He worked in Pooparika Varugirom, which released as his last film before his death, however the penultimate film he worked in before his death was Padayappa (1999), starring Rajinikanth.

== Mentor ==
Chinna Ponnusamy Padayatchi is the teacher of theatrical arts who trained Ganesan in his troupe. During an interview with V.S. Srinivasan, Ganesan said: "Theatre has taught me everything. My teacher (Chinna Ponnuswamy Padayachi of Chidambaram) taught me Bharatnatyam, acting, body movements & practically everything. Padayachi, was himself an outstanding stage actor and I learnt in an atmosphere that was reminiscent of an ashram school."

== Philanthropic work ==
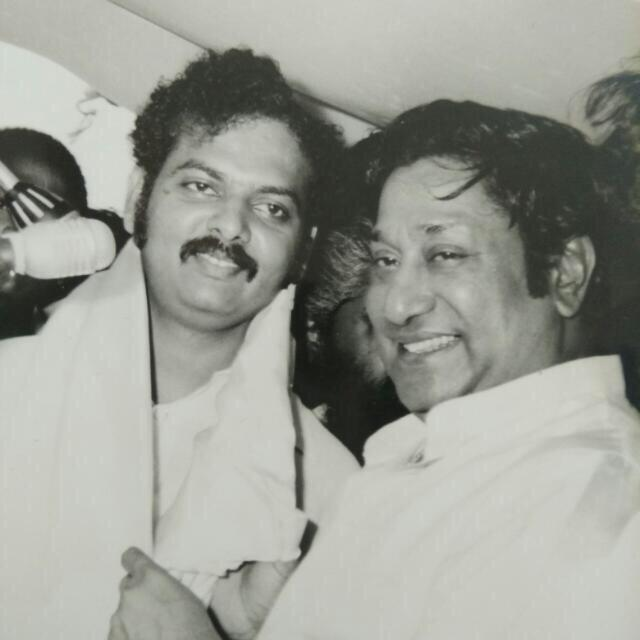
Sivaji Ganesan with Dr. Rajeswaran

Sivaji Ganesan has made many financial contributions during natural disasters and for the educational development. In 1960, K. Kamaraj introduced the Midday Meal Scheme for which Sivaji Ganesan donated one lakh rupees. Sivaji Ganesan presented an 80 gram gold chain to P. Kakkan, who was living in poverty, and also he donated the entire proceeds from the play 'Thanga Pathakkam' which is held at the Salem Nehru Auditorium. He also donated a large amount of money during the Indo-Pakistani War of 1965. Sivaji Ganesan bought the place where the freedom fighter Veerapandiya Kattabomman was executed in Kayatharu and placed a statue of Veerapandiya Kattabomman at his expense which is still a monument even today. He has donated Elephants to many temples like the Trichy in Thiruvanaikaval Jambukeswarar Temple and the Thanjavur Pragatheswarar Temple alias (Thanjai Periya Kovil), Punnainallur Mariyamman Temple.

In the Pancha Bhoota Sthalam temple of Thiruvanaikaval in Trichy, where Lord Shiva manifests as water in the form of Jambukeswarar and the Goddess as Akilandeswari, Sivaji Ganesan, having become a devout worshipper with immense devotion to Goddess Akilandeswari, gifted a female elephant named Akila to the temple and also bequeathed land and properties for its upkeep.

== Political career ==
Ganesan started his political career as an activist of the Dravidar Kazhagam. Ganesan joined the Dravida Munnetra Kazhagam after it was founded by C. N. Annadurai in 1949. Until 1956, Ganesan was a staunch supporter of the Dravida Munnetra Kazhagam (DMK). In the 1950s, however, Sivaji Ganesan was criticized for going "against the stated values of rationalism" during a visit to Tirupathi. In 1956 he left the DMK.

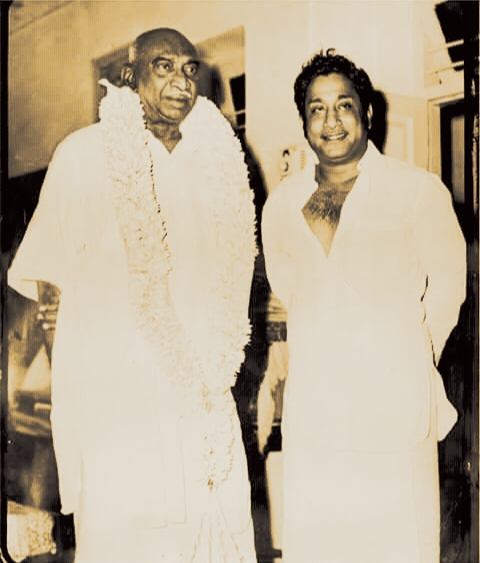
Sivaji Ganesan with Kamarajar

Due to his popularity, he was requested to be part of the Indian National Congress Tamil Nadu. His respect for Kamaraj made him support Congress.

From 1964, Ganesan became a strong supporter of the Indian National Congress. He embraced Congress leader Kamarajar's leadership. He was made the Rajya Sabha Member of Parliament by then Prime Minister Indira Gandhi. Indira Gandhi's death in 1984 also brought Ganesan's political career to an end.

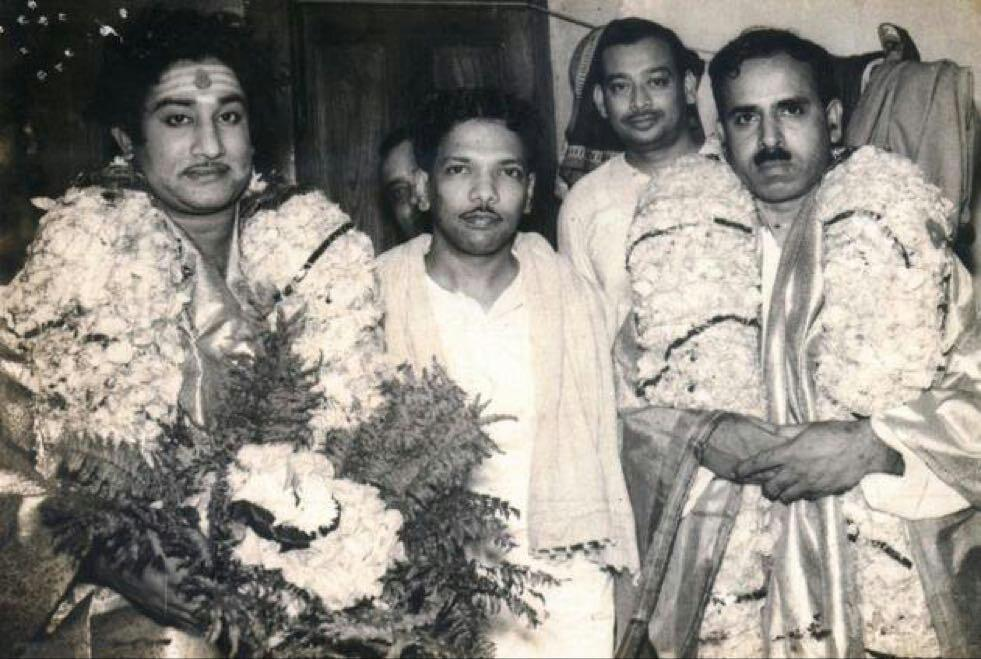
Sivaji Ganesan (far left) with M. Karunanidhi next to him.

After the death of All India Anna Dravida Munnetra Kazhagam (AIADMK) founder and Chief Minister of Tamil Nadu M. G. Ramachandran in 1987, AIADMK broke into two, one headed by Tamil movie star J. Jayalalithaa and other by MGR's wife V. N. Janaki Ramachandran. Election Commission of India refused to accept either of them as the original AIADMK. Tamil Nadu Congress decided to ally with only United AIADMK. This move was opposed by Sivaji Ganesan and hence he left the party along with his supporters to form the new party Thamizhaga Munnetra Munnani on 10 February 1988. To popularise the party Ganesan produce a movie titled En Thamizh En Makkal (My Tamil language and my people). At the time the party was created it was considered to be pro-Liberation Tigers of Tamil Eelam. The party opposed the presence of Indian Peace Keeping Force in Sri Lanka stating that the force was trying to wipe out the LTTE and its leader V. Prabhakaran. The party also urged the Government of India to hold talks with the LTTE without any pre- condition. In the 1989 elections, his party lost all of its seats in favor of V. N. Janaki Ramachandran. Sivaji himself was defeated by DMK candidate Durai Chandrasekaran in the Tiruvayaru seat by a difference of 10,643 votes.

He later joined the Janata Dal under VP Singh and rose through the ranks to become the party's state president, but his political career came to an end in 1993.

=== Political parties ===
S.No	Party's Leader	Party's	Year's Active
1	Periyar E. V. Ramasamy	Dravidar Kazhagam	(1945–1949)
2	C. N. Annadurai	Dravida Munnetra Kazhagam	(1949–1956)
-	None	Independent politician	(1956-1961) & (1993–2001)
3	E. V. K. Sampath	Tamil National Party	(1961–1964)
4	Kamarajar/Jawaharlal Nehru/Gulzarilal Nanda/Lal Bahadur Shastri/Indira Gandhi/Rajiv Gandhi	Indian National Congress	(1964–1969) & (1977–1988)
5	Kamarajar	Congress (O)	(1969–1976)
6	Indira Gandhi	Congress (R)	(1976–1977)
7	Sivaji Ganesan	Thamizhaga Munnetra Munnani	(1988–1989)
8	V. P. Singh	Janata Dal	(1989–1993)

== Family ==
Ganesan was the fourth son of his family. He had three brothers and one sister. Ganesan married Kamala on 1 May 1952 and had four children. His younger son Prabhu is a notable Tamil actor. Ganesan established a film production company in the late 1950s, now called Sivaji Productions, which is now being looked after by his elder son Ramkumar. He has two daughters Shanthi and Thenmozhi. Two of his grandsons namely Vikram Prabhu and Dushyant Ramkumar have also appeared in films, with Ramkumar's son Dushyanth Ramkumar initially having the stage name of Junior Sivaji. Moreover, Prabhu's son Vikram Prabhu debuted in the critically acclaimed film Kumki in 2012.

== Death ==
Suffering from respiratory problems, Ganesan was admitted to the Apollo Hospital in Chennai on 1 July 2001. He also had been suffering from a prolonged heart ailment for about 10 years. He died at 7:45 pm (IST) on 21 July 2001 at the age of 72 just two and a half months prior to his 73rd birthday for which he had special plans. A documentary Parasakthi Muthal Padayappa Varai was made to commemorate Sivaji Ganesan's legacy. He was given a State funeral. His funeral the next day was telecast live on Sun TV and was attended by thousands of viewers, politicians and personalities from the South Indian film fraternity. His eldest son Ramkumar Ganesan, performed his last rites at the Besant Nagar Crematorium, Chennai.

== International recognition ==
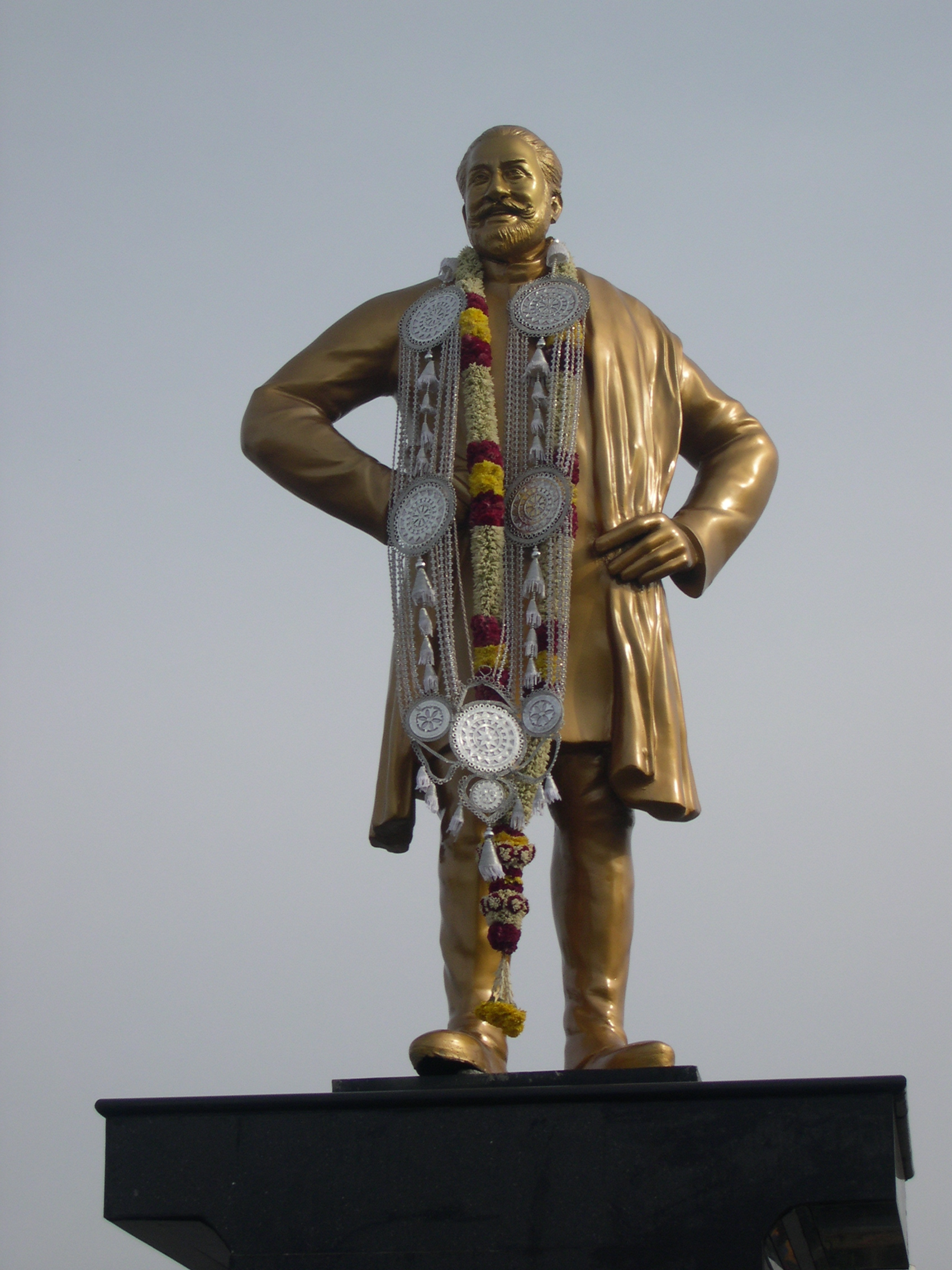
Ganesan Statue on Kamarajar Road in Chennai

When President Gamal Abdel Nasser of Egypt visited India, Sivaji Ganesan was the only individual granted permission by the then-Indian Prime Minister Jawaharlal Nehru, to host a party for Nasser. Nasser was given a number of valuable mementos depicting the civilisation and culture of South India. Sivaji Ganesan was the first artist from India to visit the United States in a cultural exchange programme by the US government. In 1962, Ganesan was invited by the then-US President John F. Kennedy, where he took the role of India's cultural ambassador. During his visit there, he was honoured by being made the honorary mayor of Niagara Falls, New York, for one day and was presented the golden key to the city. The only other Indian who has had this honour before Ganesan was Jawaharlal Nehru. Upon returning to India from both Egypt and the US, massive crowds of fans were present at Madras Airport to celebrate his arrival. On 22 March 1976, he travelled to Mauritius on an invitation from Prime Minister Ramagoolam and took part in their independence day celebrations and stayed as their government guest for four days.

During his visit to the United States in June 1995, he visited Columbus, Ohio. Participating in the dinner hosted to honour Ganesan, the mayor of the city, Greg Lashutka honoured him by announcing him as an honorary citizen of Columbus. On the same occasion, the mayor of Mount Vernon read out and gave him a special welcome citation. The Columbus Tamil Sangam was formulated on that day and Ganesan was made the honorary president of that association.

Although Sivaji appeared less in leading roles after the 1980s, his supporting roles were received positively, as in Thevar Magan, which won him the National Awards Jury's Special Jury award in 1993. Sivaji, incidentally, declined the award.

== Legacy ==
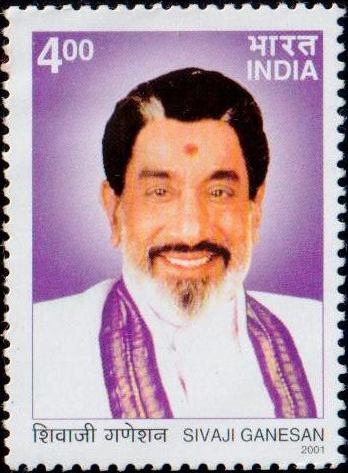
A commemorative postage stamp of Sivaji Ganesan.

Sivaji Ganesan is considered one of the best Indian actors of all time. He was also acknowledged as a consummate actor and one of the most imitated ones. He was praised for his body language and his resounding voice and dialogue delivery. Ganesan is known for his versatility and has acted as a blind man in Palum Pazhamum, a physically handicapped person in Bhaaga Pirivinai, enacting Nine numbers of totally different personas from various social strata and the corresponding body language (gait, voice, facial expression, etc.) in " Navarathiri", thereby becoming probably the first-time in Indian cinema history as an actor reprising Nine roles in a single film and in extension, inspiring subsequent films (at least) in Tamil like "Navarathinam" (the great MGR – starred), "Dasavatharam" (featuring Kamal Haasan), a man with a scared face as in Deiva Magan, a murderer in Pudhiya Paravai, or a traitor as in Andha Naal, the first movie that had no songs at all.

On 1 October 2021, Google commemorated Ganesan's 93rd birth anniversary with a Google Doodle on their Indian homepage.

== Awards and honours ==
=== Civilian honours: national and international ===
Year	Award	Honouring body	Outcome	Ref
1966	Padma Shri	Government of India	Won	
1984	Padma Bhushan	Government of India	Won	
1995	Chevalier National Order of the Legion of Honour	Government of France	Won	

=== International awards ===
Year	Award	Honouring body	Outcome	Ref
1960	Best Actor at Afro-Asian Film Festival	Veerapandiya Kattabomman	Won	

==== National Film Awards ====
Year	Award	Honouring body	Outcome	Ref
1992	National Film Award – Special Jury Award	Thevar Magan	Won	
1996	Dadasaheb Phalke Award	Honor for his Contributions to Indian Cinema	Won	

==== Filmfare Awards South ====
Year	Award	Honouring body	Outcome	Ref
1972	Filmfare Best Tamil Actor Award	Gnana Oli	Won	
1973	Filmfare Best Tamil Actor Award	Gauravam	Won	
1985	Filmfare Best Tamil Actor Award	Muthal Mariyathai	Won	
1985	Filmfare Lifetime Achievement Award – South		Won	

==== Tamil Nadu State Film Awards ====
Year	Award	Honouring body	Outcome	Ref
1969	Tamil Nadu State Film Award for Best Actor	Deiva Magan	Won	
1970	Tamil Nadu State Film Award for Best Film	Vietnam Veedu	Won	
1989	Tamil Nadu State Film Honorary Award	MGR Award	Won	

==== Other honours ====
Year	Award	Honouring body	Outcome	Ref
1986	Honorary doctorate	Annamalai University	Won	
1962	Kalaimamani	Government of Tamil Nadu	Won	
1998	NTR National Award	Government of Andhra Pradesh	Won	

=== Posthumous honours ===
Pondicherry (Puducherry) was the first union territory to erect a statue of Sivaji Ganesan in honor of his acting skills and his huge fan base in the state and it was unveiled by the then Puducherry Chief Minister N. Rangasamy. A statue of Ganesan was erected on Kamarajar Road in Chennai, Tamil Nadu to honour the actor and was unveiled by the then Tamil Nadu Chief Minister M. Karunanidhi in 2006.

== Memorial ==
In 2017, a memorial built by the Public Works Department at a cost of ₹ 28 million was opened in Chennai. Located in Adyar, a southern neighbourhood of the city, it is built in the Tamil style of architecture, adorned with domes, and houses a statue of the actor, which was previously erected on the Marina Beach in 2006.

== Bibliography ==
- Ganesan, Sivaji (2007) [2002]. Enathu Suya Sarithai [Autobiography of an Actor: Sivaji Ganesan, October 1928 – July 2001]. Sivaji Prabhu Charities Trust.
