= Vanchinathan =

Indian independence activist (1886–1911)

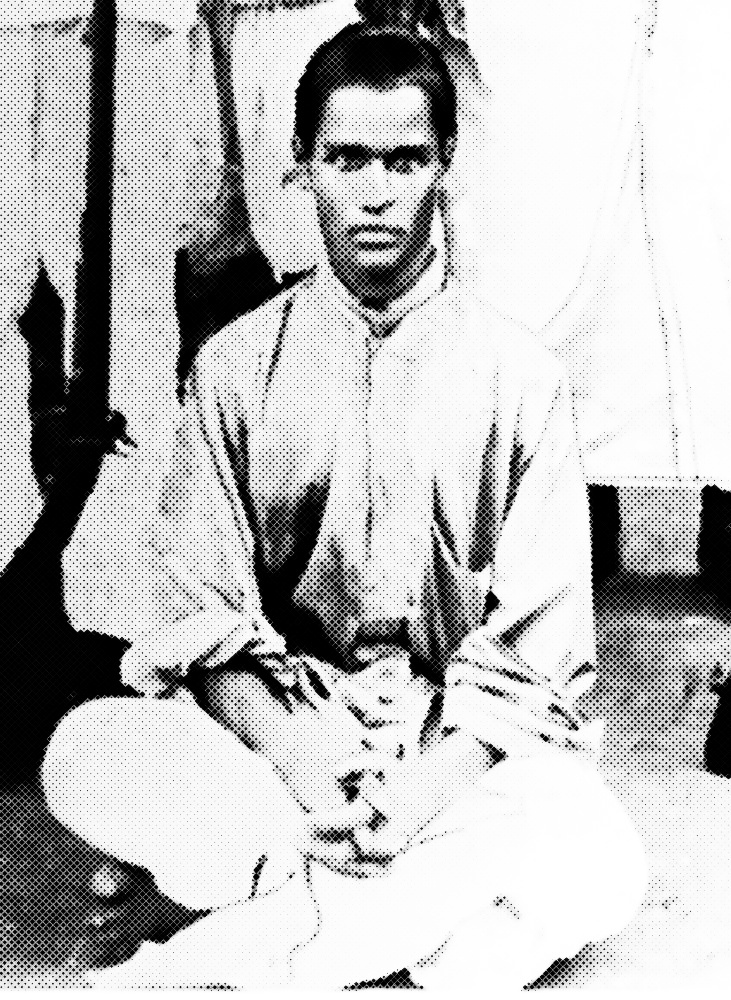
- Born: Shankaran; 1886; Sengottai, Travancore, British India (presently in Tenkasi district, Tamil Nadu)
- Died: 17 June 1911 (aged 24–25); Maniyachchi, Tirunelveli district, Madras Presidency, British India (presently in Tamil Nadu)
- Cause of death: Suicide
- Known for: Assassination of Robert Ashe
- Movement: Indian independence movement
- Spouse: Ponnamma

Vanchinathan (1886 – 17 June 1911), popularly known as Vanchi, was an Indian independence activist. He assassinated Robert Ashe, then district collector of Tirunelveli district, on 17 June 1911 at the Maniyachchi railway station. Ashe was considered to have encouraged discrimination against Indians, suppressed independence activism, and ordered the use of violence to quell the same. Vanchinathan committed suicide immediately afterwards while trying to evade arrest. The assassination of Ashe was a significant event in the Indian independence movement in South India and marked a trend in the rise of revolutionary movements against British rule.

== Early and personal life ==
Vanchinathan was born in 1886 in a poor Hindu family in Sengottai, Travancore, British India (presently in Tenkasi district of Tamil Nadu). His parents Ragupathy Iyer and Rukmani named him Shankaran. He did his schooling in Sengottai before completing his bachelor's degree. He started his career as an accountant in a Hindu temple before he landed a government job in the Travancore forest department. He married Ponnamma and the couple had a daughter who died as an infant.

== Indian freedom activism ==
Vanchinathan participated in activities against the British rule in India. He was trained in arms by V. V. S. Aiyar, who sought violent means to defeat the British. Nilakanta Brahmachari was a compatriot of Subramania Bharati and worked as a sub-editor in the newspaper India. After the Tinnevely riot of 1908, Brahmachari recruited youth to join his organisation called "Bharatha Matha Sangam" and worked on various methods to protest against the British rule. Vanchinathan's brother-in-law Shankara Krishna Iyer was part of the group headed by Brahmachari and introduced Vanchinathan to him.

=== Assassination of Ashe ===
Robert Ashe was then district collector of Tirunelveli district. He repressed the Swadeshi Steam Navigation Company, founded by Indian nationalist V. O. Chidambaram Pillai, which was supported by Indian merchants and gave employment to Indian workers. He charged Chidambaram and fellow activist Subramaniya Siva with sedition, for which they were arrested and convicted. During the Tinnevely riots of 1908, he issued the order for the police to quell the riots by violence. He followed a policy of discrimination and Indians were barred at Coutrallam when the British accessed it. In response to his actions, the revolutionary faction of Brahmachari decided to assassinate him, and 25-year old Vanchinathan was chosen for the task. Vanchinathan closely started following the activities of Ashe, while planning for the assassination. He learnt that Ashe would be traveling from Tirunelveli to Madras on 17 June 1911 via Maniyachchi railway station.

On 17 June 1911, Ashe and his wife traveled from Tirunelveli to Maniyachchi via train to catch the Boat Mail Express from Ceylon to Madras. Unbeknownst to them, Vanchinathan and fellow activist Madasamy had boarded the train at Tirunelveli at 9:30 am. When the train reached Maniyachchi at 10:35 am, the men moved towards the first class compartment of the train, where Ashe was seated. Vanchinathan took a pistol hidden in his coat and shot Ashe at point blank range twice, killing him. He escaped, hid in the station lavatory, and shot himself to commit suicide thereafter. As per the police report, he used a Browning semi-automatic pistol, procured by Bhikaiji Cama from Paris. His accomplice escaped, following the incident. Vanchinathan's father refused to collect the body as he considered his act as against Brahminism. A letter was found in his pocket, in which he accused the British of destroying the Sanatana Dharma, claimed to have committed the assassination on his own accord and that he had done his part to drive the British out of the country.

== Legacy ==
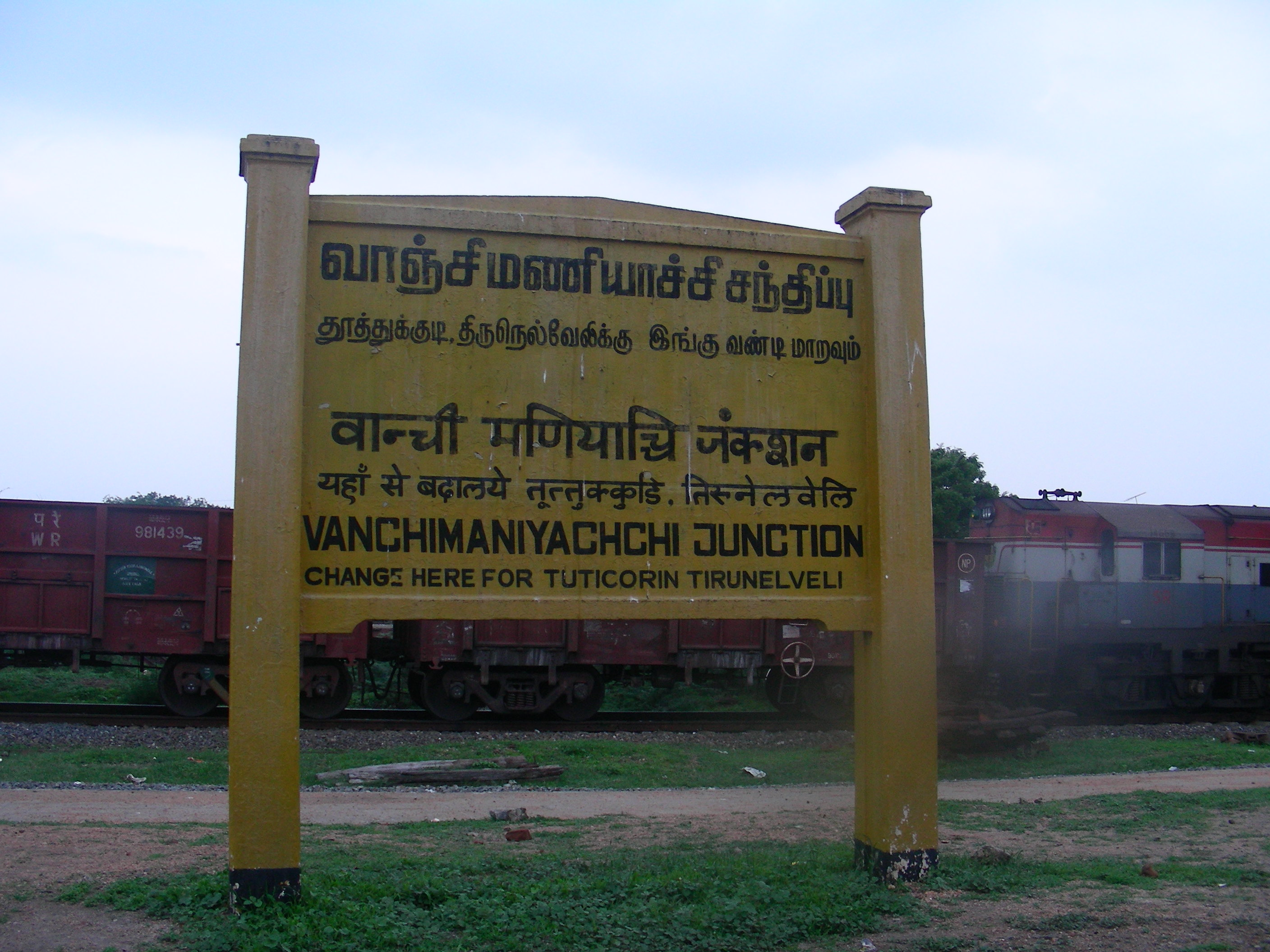
The railway station where he shot Ashe is named after Vanchi

The assassination of Ashe was one of the significant events in the Indian independence movement in South India. It marked the rise of revolutionary movement which supported the use of arms as against the moderate movement propagated by Mahatma Gandhi and others. Ashe was the first and last British high ranking official to be assassinated in South India during the rule of the British.

The railway station in Tamil Nadu, where he shot Ashe, was renamed as Vanchi Maniyachchi Junction railway station in his remembrance. In 2010, the Government of Tamil Nadu announced that a memorial will be built at his birthplace in Sengottai, and the memorial was inaugurated in 2013. Many streets and localities in Tamil Nadu and Puducherry have been named after him.

In the Tamil film Kappalottiya Thamizhan (1961) based on the life of Chidambaram Pillai, Balaji played the role of Vanchinathan and various events involving Vanjinathan, including the assassination event, are showcased.
