= Sivaji Ganesan Memorial =

Memorial for Sivaji Ganesan in Chennai, India

Coordinates: 13.0163°N 80.2593°E

The Sivaji Ganesan Memorial is a memorial for veteran Tamil actor Sivaji Ganesan, located in Chennai, India. It is located on Durgabai Deshmukh Road in Adyar, a southern neighbourhood of the city. He was born on October 1, 1928, and died on July 21, 2001.

== The memorial ==
The memorial for actor Sivaji Ganesan was built by the Public Works Department in 2017 at a cost of ₹ 28 million. The memorial is spread over 28,300 square feet. The building is built in the Dravidian style of architecture, adorned with domes. The memorial also houses a statue of the actor.

The memorial complex also consists of a reverse osmosis plant for drinking water needs. The 2.35-metre-high bronze statue of the actor previously installed on Kamarajar Salai (Marina Beach) in 2006 was shifted to the memorial in August 2017.

The memorial was inaugurated on his birth anniversary (October 1, 2017) by Deputy CM O. Panneerselvam in the presence of Fisheries Minister D. Jayakumar, Information and Publicity Minister Kadambur Raju, senior members of South Indian Artistes' Association and the family of Sivaji Ganesan.

== See also ==
- Tholkappia Poonga
