= C. R. Parthiban =

Indian Tamil actor (1931–2021)

- Born: C.R.Parthiban; 1 July 1931; Vellore, Madras presidency, British India (now) Tamil Nadu, India
- Died: January 25, 2021 (aged 89–90); Chennai, Tamil Nadu, India
- Occupation: film actor
- Years active: 1959-1995

C. R. Parthiban (1 July 1931 – 25 January 2021) was an Indian actor who worked mainly in Tamil cinema and theatre. He was best known for his performance as Jackson Durai in Veerapandiya Kattabomman (1959).

== Biography ==
Parthiban was born in Vellore, and was a relative of C. Rajagopalachari. In 1946, he moved to Madras (now Chennai).

== Death ==
Parthiban died on 25 January 2021 at the age of 90.

== Notable filmography ==
C. R. Parthiban acted in more than 120 movies.

- Pudhumai Pithan (1957)
- Vanji Kottai Valipan (1958)
- Veerapandiya Kattabomman (1959)
- Kappalottiya Thamizhan (1961)
- Aalayamani (1962)
- Sumaithaangi (1962)
- Motor Sundaram Pillai (1966)
- Sange Muzhangu (1972)
- Then Sindhudhe Vaanam (1975)
- Idhayakkani (1975)
- Navarathinam (1977)
- Moondru Mugam (1982)
- Kaakki Sattai (1985)
- Viduthalai (1986)
- Chinna Vathiyar (1995)
