= Kayatharu =

Kayathar
- town
- Location in Tamil Nadu, India
- Coordinates: 08°57′N 77°48′E
- Country: India
- State: Tamil Nadu
- Region: Madurai
- District: Thoothukudi

Population (2001)
  - Total: 9,497

Languages
  - Official: Tamil
- Time zone: UTC+5:30 (IST)
- Nearest city: Tirunelveli

Kayathar / Kayatharu is a panchayat town in Thoothukudi district in the Indian state of Tamil Nadu.

== Etymology ==
Kayathar / Kayatharu means "bitter river", from Aaru (Tamil for river) and kayarpu/kasappu (Tamil for bitter). 'Aaru' refers to the river flowing through the town and 'kasappu' was attributed to Sri Kodhandaramar who always wore a thulasi malai (.i.e., a garland of basil leaves which has a bitter taste). Additionally, the temple dedicated to Sri Kodhandaramar is located on the banks of the river. The temple- officially named 'Arulmigu Kothandarameswarar Temple' is one among the oldest temples in Thoothukudi district.

== History ==
The last Pandiya King, Marthanda Varman, fought and lost to the Nayakar Dynasty at Kayathar.

The place is also of extreme historical significance as the king of Panchalankurichi, Veerapandiya Kattabomman, who fought against the British in India's Freedom movement was hung to death here after his capture and subsequent arrest. A statue commemorating him was built in Kayathar by Tamil cinema actor Sivaji Ganeshan.

Another prevalent folklore in this area is that ancient Thamizh poet Kalamega Kavi was refused food in the local Perumal temple despite great hunger and thirst. The Perumal temple subsequently degraded as a result of the poet's curse, until it was rebuilt in 2009.

== Geography ==
It is situated along National Highway 7 (NH7) between Tirunelveli and Kovilpatti.

Kayathar / Kayatharu is situated about 25 kilometres (16 mi) from Tirunelveli on the way to Madurai. Veerapandiya Kattabomman, one of the earliest opponents of British rule in India (in the first Polygar War), was hanged here on a Tamarind tree, by the British in 1799. A memorial to him has been built here by the Tamil Nadu government.

=== Conservation ===
Kutti Kulam: The water harvesting area. The rain water is saved in this pool for agricultural usage.

== Demographics ==
=== Population ===
As of 2001 India census, Kayatharu had a population of 9497. Males constitute 50% of the population and females 50%. Kayatharu has an average literacy rate of 66%, higher than the national average of 59.5%: male literacy is 74%, and female literacy is 57%. In Kayatharu, 10% of the population is under 6 years of age.

=== Religion ===
Hinduism, Christianity and Muslim. The city has temples, churches and mosques.

== Economy ==
Mat production is a huge industry. The area is famous for heavy winds so it has windmills.

The city has a weekly market, held every Thursday. There is an exclusive area for the functioning of this market. Several goods from cooking items to animals are sold here. Kayathar is the center for marketing many agricultural things for the farmers around ~50 villages.

== Education ==
Veera Pandia Kattabomman Govt. Hr. Sec. School. The school is named after the Veerapandiya Kattabomman. He was remembered for his activism against the British. The school is located midst farm fields. And BABA MARTIC CULATION HR.SEC.SCHOOL for financially settled people for English medium.

== Sports ==
Several cultural and sports events are arranged by the youngsters during the Pongal festival (14-20 January). The Kabadi game conducted is the most famous among those. More than 20 teams from nearby villages are participating every year.
