= Tiruchendur railway station =

Railway station in Tamil Nadu, India

Tiruchendur Thiruchenthoor
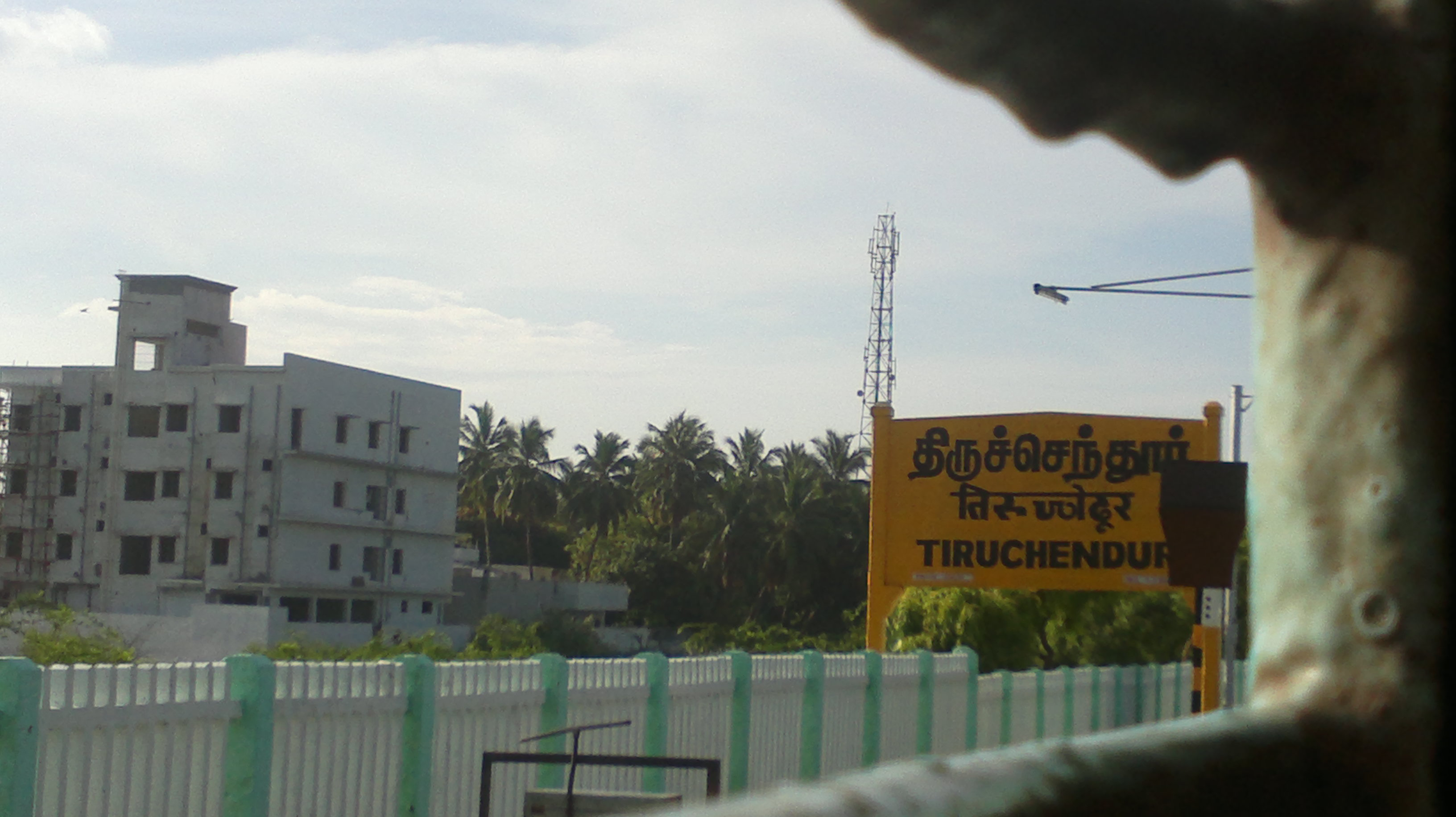
- Tiruchendur railway station

General information
- Location: SH 176, Tiruchendur, Thoothukudi district, Tamil Nadu; India
- Coordinates: 8.5025°N 78.1175°E
- Elevation: 5 metres (16 ft)
- System: Indian Railways Station
- Owner: Ministry of Railways (India)
- Operator: Indian Railways
- Line: Tirunelveli -Tiruchendur -Tuticorin
- Platforms: 3 Side platforms
- Tracks: 4
- Connections: Auto rickshaw stand, Taxi stand

Construction
- Structure type: Standard on-ground station
- Parking: Yes

Other information
- Status: Functioning
- Station code: TCN
- Zone(s): Southern Railway zone
- Division(s): Madurai

History
- Opened: 1923; 103 years ago
- Closed: 2023
- Rebuilt: 31 December 2009; 16 years ago
- Former names: Thiruchenthoor

Passengers
- 2022–23: 967,465 (per year); 2,651 (per day) ▲108%
- Rank: 2
Route map
Location
- Location within India Location within Tamil Nadu

Tiruchendur railway station (station code: TCN) is an NSG–3 category Indian railway station in Madurai railway division of Southern Railway zone. It serves the town of Tiruchendur, located in Thoothukudi district of the Indian state of Tamil Nadu.

== History ==
After Tirunelveli got the rail connectivity, then ‘Jilla Board Member’ Arumuganeri ‘Mela Veedu’ S.P. Ponnaiah Nadar started taking efforts to connect Tiruchendur with Tirunelveli by train. Following the efforts spearheaded by him, the Colonial government passed the resolution on 1 October 1900 favouring the establishment of rail connectivity between Tirunelveli and Tiruchendur. Subsequently, the ‘Jilla Board Meeting’ held on 23 March 1903 gave its approval for laying the rail track between the two towns. This line, which was proposed by the District Board of Tinnevelly in 1903. was surveyed by the South Indian railway administration during 1904. at the cost of the District Board. It would be 37.60 miles in length and is estimated to cost Rs. 20,52,000 to construct a meter gauge line. Proposals for its financing were awaited from the District Board who have levied a special cess in order to form a railway construction fund for the district. The first train service was flagged off on 23 February 1923.

== Projects and development ==
It is one of the 75 stations in Tamil Nadu to be named for upgradation under Amrit Bharat Station Scheme of Indian Railways.

17.5 crore rupees have been allocated for the renovation work of Tiruchendur railway station under the Amrit Bharat scheme.

== Performance and earnings ==
For the FY 2022–23, the annual earnings of the station was ₹154,634,504 (US$1.7 million) and daily earnings was ₹423,656 (US$4,500). For the same financial year, the annual passenger count was 967,465 and daily count was 2,651. While, the footfall per day was recorded as 5609.
