= Veerapandian =

Veerapandian is an Indian surname. Notable people with the surname include:

- Jega Veerapandian, Indian politician
- Suba Veerapandian (born 1952), Indian writer and politician
