= Palayamkottai Central Prison =

Prison in Tirunelveli district, India

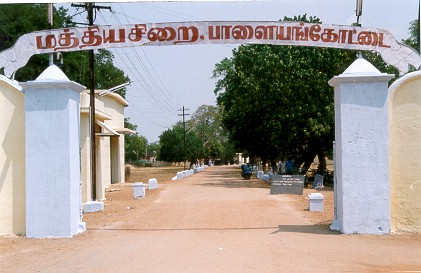
- Palayamkottai Central Prison

- Location in Tamil Nadu Palayamkottai Central Prison (India)
- Location: Palayamkottai; 8.708072°N 77.73269°E
- Security class: Central Prison
- Managed by: Tamil Nadu Prison Department

Palayamkottai Central Prison is located in Palayamkottai, Tirunelveli District, India. The prison was built during 1880 and was operating as a district jail until 1929. The jail was converted into a Borstal school in 1929, which was later transferred to Pudukottai due to lower admissions. It became a central prison starting from 1 April 1968. It is located in an area corresponding to 117.75 acres (0.4765 km^{2}) and authorised to house 1332 prisoners.
