= Tirunelveli Junction railway station =

Railway station in Tamil Nadu, India

Tirunelveli Junction Tirunelveli Sandhippu
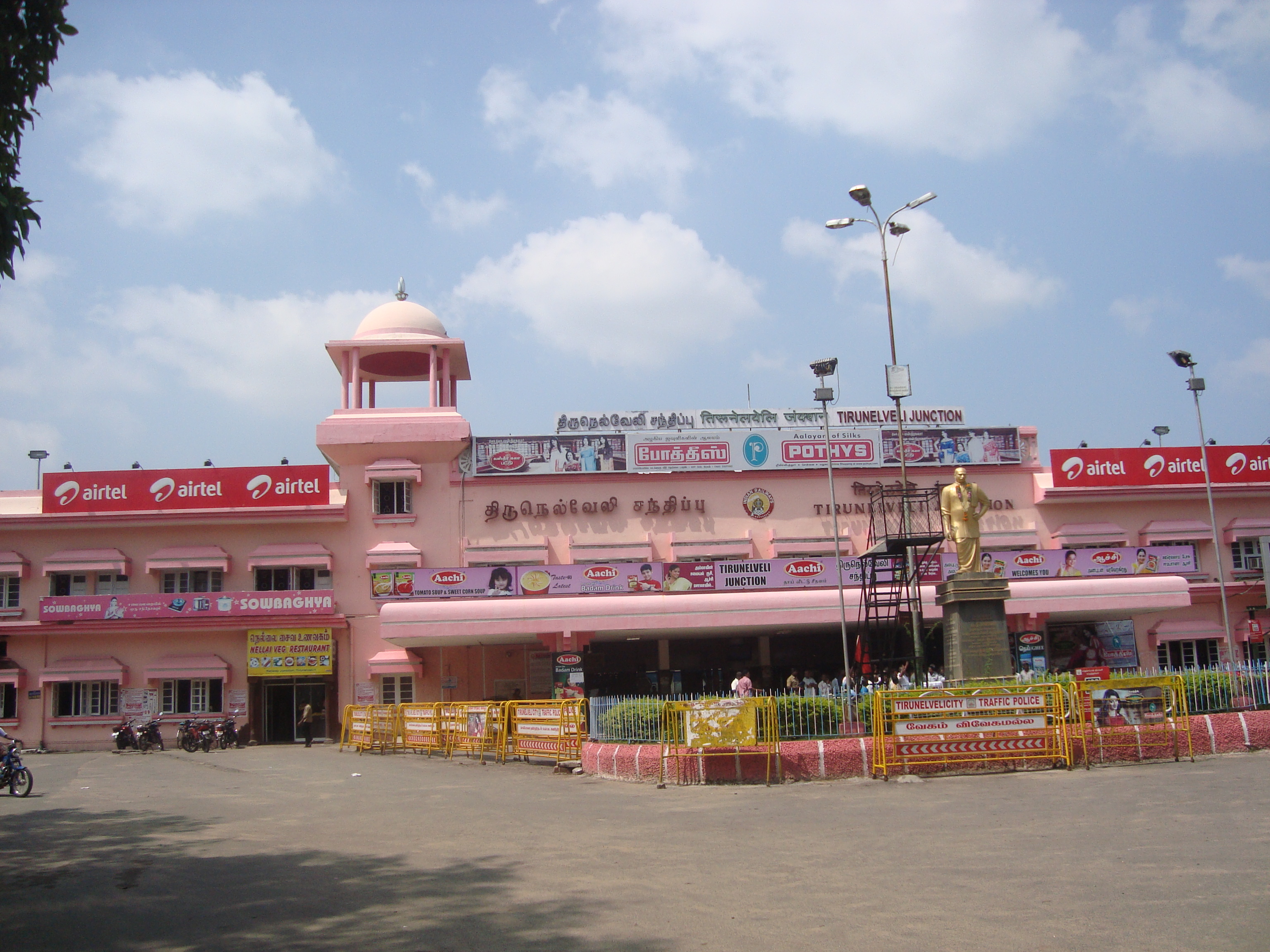
- Main Entrance of Tirunelveli Station

General information
- Other names: Nellai Junction, Tinnevelly Junction (archaic/colonial)
- Location: Railway Feeder Road, Tirunelveli, Tamil Nadu, India; India
- Coordinates: 8.737°N 77.708°E
- System: Indian Railways Station
- Owner: Ministry of Railways (India)
- Operator: Indian Railways
- Lines: Tirunelveli – Vanchi Maniyachchi; Tirunelveli – Nagercoil; Tirunelveli – Tiruchendur; Tirunelveli – Tenkasi
- Platforms: 6 Side platforms
- Tracks: 9
- Connections: Taxi Stand, Auto Rickshaw Stand

Construction
- Structure type: Standard (on ground station)
- Parking: Available
- Cycle facilities: Available

Other information
- Status: Operational
- Station code: TEN
- Zone(s): Southern Railway zone
- Division(s): Madurai
- Fare zone: Southern Railway zone

History
- Opened: 1893; 133 years ago

Passengers
- 2022–23: 4,020,879 (per year); 11,016 (per day)
Track layout
Track Layout
Location

Tirunelveli Junction railway station (also known as Nellai Junction railway station)(station code: TEN) is an NSG–2 category Indian railway station in Madurai railway division of Southern Railway zone. It serves the city of Tirunelveli, located in Tirunelveli district of the Indian state of Tamil Nadu.

The Nellai Express – a super-fast train connecting Tirunelveli and Chennai Egmore – runs packed almost throughout the year. The station is one of the oldest on the Indian railway network, built in 1893.

It acts as a major railway junction and every train passing through this station has a mandatory halt here in any of the available 5 platforms. Passenger trains towards Sengottai railway station, Tiruchendur railway station, Tuticorin Railway Station, Nagercoil Junction railway station, Erode Junction railway station, Tiruchirappalli Junction railway station departs from here.

== Projects and development ==
It is one of the 75 stations in Tamil Nadu to be named for upgradation under Amrit Bharat Station Scheme of Indian Railways.

270 crore rupees have been allocated for the renovation work of Tirunelveli railway station under the Amrit Bharat scheme.

Major works to be planned under the scheme:

- Platform 6 is being newly constructed, earlier a freight train platform was functioning here, which has been shifted to Gangaikondan railway station earlier.
- * A new entrance has been constructed in the west and east side and the facility is being provided to easily access the railway station through the new road facility. This will reduce the pressure on the main entrance.
- A new elevated walkway is being constructed to connect the west and east terminus.
- Renovation of station facade,
- Interior development of the station,
- Replacement of platform roofs
- New passenger Accommodations, Toilets, spacious platform accommodations
- Renovation of the railway station to make it easily accessible for the disabled persons
- Additional parking spaces
- Digital sign boards, CCTV's and Integrated announcement system,
- Additional lifts, escalators, Passenger seats and
- Projects identified include redevelopment of the railway station with emphasis on landscaping and horticulture.

== Performance and earnings ==
For the FY 2022–23, the annual earnings of the station was ₹1,148,600,461 (US$12 million) and daily earnings was ₹3,146,851 (US$34,000). For the same financial year, the annual passenger count was 4,020,879 and daily count was 11,016. While, the footfall per day was recorded as 23,416.

== Railway lines ==
Line No.	Towards
1	Vanchi Maniyachchi Junction (North)
2	Nagercoil Junction (South)
3	Tenkasi Junction (West)
4	Tiruchendur (East)
