= Robert Ashe (civil servant) =

British civil servant in India

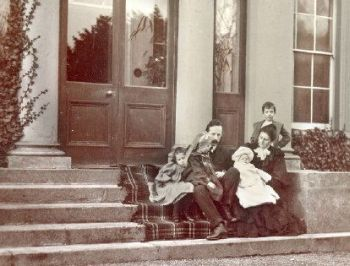
Ashe and his family.

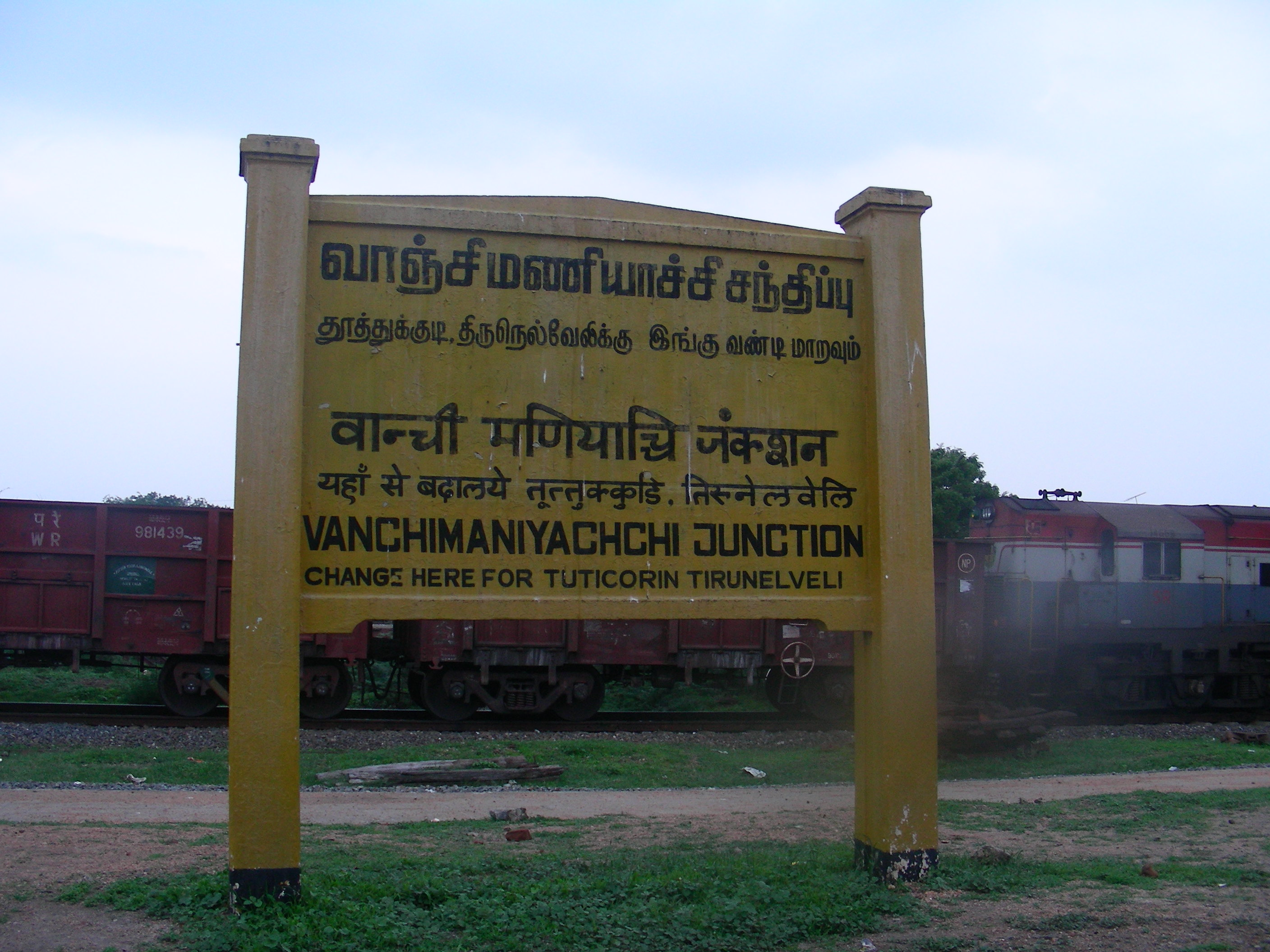
Maniyachi railway station, where Ashe was assassinated (currently renamed as Vanchi Maniyachi after Vanchinathan)

Robert William d'Escourt Ashe (23 November 1872 – 17 June 1911) was the acting Collector and District magistrate of Tirunelveli district in Madras Presidency during the British colonialism. On 17 June 1911 Ashe was assassinated by Vanchinathan at the Maniyachi railway junction, between Tirunelveli and Tuticorin. After the shooting, Vanchinathan ran along the platform and took cover in station masters room. Some time later he was found dead, having shot himself in the mouth. Vanchi was accompanied by a youth named Sankara Krishna Aiyar who ran away, but was afterwards caught and convicted. Ashe was the first and only colonial official to be assassinated in South India during the Indian independence movement. The British government built a memorial for him at Tuticorin in 1913. That memorial is currently in dilapidated condition.

== Personal life ==
Ashe was a Protestant from Ireland. He attended The High School, Dublin, where a plaque commemorated his death, erected by "School fellows and other friends" soon after his passing. He had two sons and two daughters. One of his sons was killed in the Second World War while the other joined the Indian Army and served until 1947. His daughters died childless.
