= Veerapandiya Kattabomman =

- Palaiyakkarar of Tenkasi
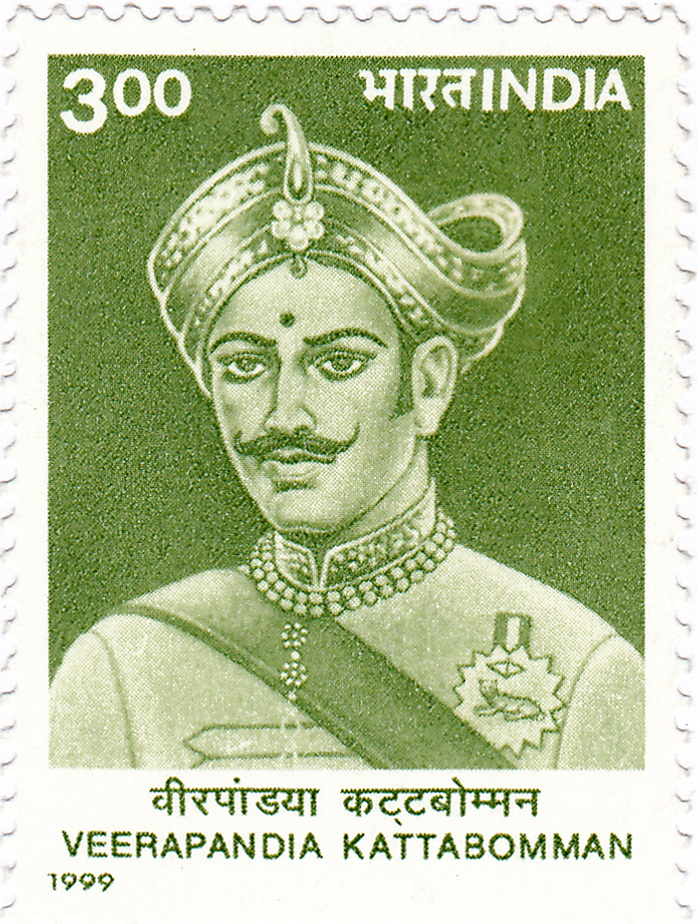
- Veerapandiya Kattabomman on a 1999 stamp
- Reign: 1792-16 October 1799
- Born: 3 January 1760; Panchalankurichi (in present-day Thoothukudi District, Tamil Nadu, India)
- Died: 16 October 1799 (aged 39); Kayatharu (now in Thoothukudi District, Tamil Nadu, India)
- Spouse: Jakkammal
- Father: Jagaveera Kattabomman Nayakar
- Mother: Arumugathammal

Veerapandiya Kattabomman was an 18th-century Palayakarrar and king of Panchalankurichi in present-day Tamil Nadu, India. He fought the British East India Company and was captured by the British with the help of the ruler of the kingdom of Pudukottai, Vijaya Raghunatha Tondaiman, and at the age of 39 he was hanged at Kayathar on 16 October 1799. He belongs to the Thokalavar sub-sect of the Rajakambala Nayakkar community.

== Early life ==
Veerapandiya Kattabomman was born to Jagaveera Kattabomman Nayakar and Arumugathammal in a Telugu family as Kattabommu. His father was the polygar (head) of Panchalankurichi. He belonged to the Bommu and Aathi Kattabomman clans of Panchalankurichi. He inherited his father's position as the polygar of Panchalankurichi when he turned 30, becoming the 47th polygar of the village.

== Rebellion against the British ==
=== Background ===
Veerapandiya as a polygar retained the right to collect taxes and recruit soldiers in his domain, the British viewed the polygars as illegitimate rulers and wanted to end their taxation powers, and curtail their power and influence. To this end they introduced a new tax policy through which they intended to completely bypass the polygars and other intermediaries during tax collection. Kattabomman saw this as an attempt to usurp his sovereignty over his domain by the British and stopped paying them tributes contending that his taxes ought to be waived due to the prolonged drought in his domain, whilst fighting against polygars allied with the British.

In 1798 Kattabomman and the then Tirunelveli collector Jackson got into a disagreement over left over taxes, when Kattabomman was able to meet with Jackson three months later in Ramnathapuram, where there was an altercation between company troops and the polygar resulting in the death of the deputy commandant of the company's forces Clarke, Kattabomman was acquitted from this following an inquiry. In 1799 following his refusal to meet with the collector, the British sent an armed force under Major John Alexander Bannerman.

=== Fighting ===
Kattabomman had to make a stand at his fort in Panchalankurichi, largely unprepared, although his forces were able to hold back the company troops initially, his fort was incapable of taking on British artillery, so he withdrew from the fort into nearby forests, fighting a guerilla campaign till his capture on 1 October 1799 with the assistance of polygars allied to the British like Ettappan of Ettaiyapuram and the king of Pudukkottai Vijaya Raghunatha Thondaiman.

=== Arrest and execution ===
Following his capture, Kattabomman was interrogated for 15 days and sentenced to death. He was hanged to death at Kayathar on 16 October 1799.

His surviving relatives including his deaf-mute brother Umaidurai were also arrested and locked up in the fort of Palayamkottai, but Umaidurai escaped, joined up with other polygars and continued fighting the British. After his defeat and capture in October 1801, he too was hanged along with the other polygars who resisted the British, while the Panchalankurichi fort was razed to the ground, with its site ploughed over and planted with castor seeds, and its name expunged from all registers in the district.

== Legacy ==
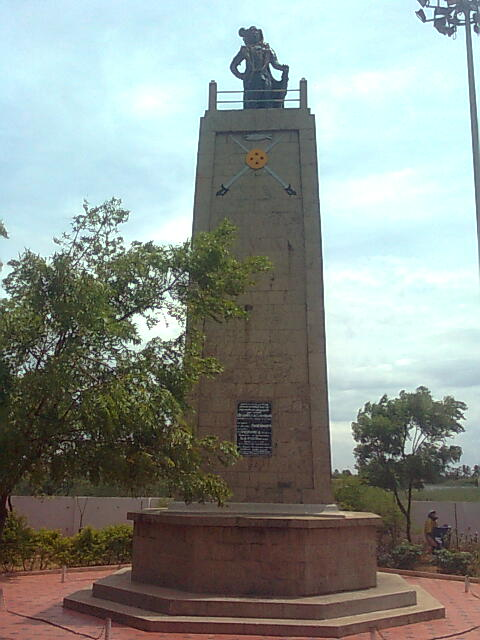
Kattabomman memorial at Kayathar

The historian Susan Bayly says that Kattabomman is considered a Robin Hood-like figure among his people but in local folklore and is the subject of several traditional narrative ballads in the kummi verse form says kattabomman actually looted people ,Kaathu aruthan Kattabomman" (காது அறுத்தான் கட்டபொம்மன்) is a famous phrase from a traditional Tamil folklore which states that he and his men would snatch earings from men and woman while they rode horse during the loot,The site of his execution at Kayathar has become a "powerful local shrine" and at one time sheep were sacrificed there. The Tamil Nadu government rebuilt the Panchalankurichi fort in 1974. The Government of Tamil Nadu maintains a memorial at Kayathar and the remnants of the old fort at Panchalankurichi is protected by the Archaeological Survey of India. In 2006, the Tirunelveli district administration organised a festival at Panchalankurichi on his birth anniversary.

The 1959 Tamil-language film in an act of glorifying Veerapandiya Kattabomman was filmed starring Sivaji Ganesan, is based on his life.

To commemorate the bicentenary of Kattabomman's hanging, the Government of India released a postal stamp in his honour on 16 October 1999. The Indian Navy communications centre at Vijayanarayanam is named INS Kattabomman.

== See also ==
- Puli Thevar
- Dheeran Chinnamalai
- Maruthu Pandiyar
- Veeran Sundaralingam
- Oomaithurai, Veerapandiya Kattabomman's younger brother
- Rani Velu Nachiar
- Marudhanayagam Pillai
