= Panchalankurichi =

Village in Tamil Nadu, India

- village
- Country: India
- State: Tamil Nadu
- District: Thoothukudi

Languages
  - Official: Tamil
- Time zone: UTC+5:30 (IST)
- Lok Sabha constituency: Thoothukudi

Panchalankurichi is a village, 3 km from Ottapidaram and 21 km from Thoothukudi in Thoothukudi district, Tamil Nadu, India. Panchalankurichi was once a Palayam and is best known as the birthplace of Veerapandiya Kattabomman, an 18th-century Palayakarrar ('Polygar'), who opposed the British East India Company governance in the area and its revenue-raising methods.

== History ==
Panchalamkurichi (often spelled Panjalamkurichi), in the Kovilpatti taluk of Tuticorin, is traditionally recognized as one of the 72 palayams of Madura. The name is a reference to the stand taken against the Nayaks of Madura by the Pancha (or Panchala, meaning the doab) Pandyas, local chieftains tributary to the Pandyas, at a nearby kurichi or valley in the central area of Tirunelveli.

In 2006, the Tirunelveli district administration organised a festival at Panchalankurichi to celebrate the birth anniversary of Veerapandiya Kattabomman.
