= List of Tamil songs recorded by P. Susheela =

P. Susheela discography
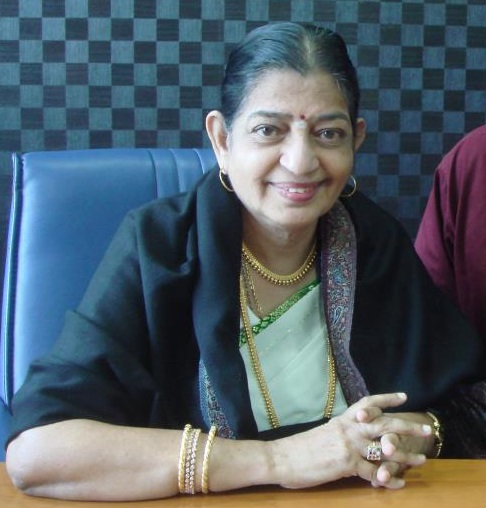

This is the Tamil discography of veteran Indian female playback singer P. Susheela, who sang in over 6000 songs in Tamil. She gave her voice to actresses and thespians in the Tamil Film Industry such as Padmini, B. Saroja Devi, Jayalalitha.

== Collaboration ==
=== Music composers ===
Major music directors who worked with her are: G. Ramanathan, S. Rajeswara Rao, T. R. Ramanathan, A. M. Rajah, K. V. Mahadevan, M. S. Viswanathan, T. K. Ramamoorthy, R. Govardhanam, R. Sudarsanam, Vedha, V. Kumar, S. M. Subbaiah Naidu, G. K. Venkatesh, G. Devarajan, P. Srinivasan, R. Parathasarathy, Ilaiyaraaja, Shankar–Ganesh, Kunnakudi Vaidyanathan, A. R. Rahman.

=== Playback singers ===
She also sang duets with many male playback singers such as C. S. Jayaraman, T. M. Soundararajan, Sirkazhi Govindarajan, A. M. Rajah, S. C. Krishnan, A. L. Raghavan, S. P. Balasubrahmanyam, K. J. Yesudas, Mano, Malaysia Vasudevan, P. Jayachandran, T. R. Maharajan.

She has sung with other female singers such as Soolamangalam Sisters, L. R. Eswari, A. P. Komala, S. Janaki, Sarala, L. R. Anjali, B. S. Sasirekha, P. Leela, T. V. Rathnam, Minmini, K. S. Chithra, S. P. Sailaja, K. Jamuna Rani, Bangalore Latha.

She sang duets with actors such as P. S. Veerappa, J. P. Chandrababu and P. Bhanumathi.

== Awards ==
=== Honours and major awards ===
- Bharathidasan Award by Government of Tamil Nadu
- Kalaimamani Award by Government of Tamil Nadu in 1991.

=== National film awards ===
The National Film Award for Best Female Playback Singer was introduced in 1968, and Susheela won the award for her rendition of Paal Polave in the film Uyarndha Manithan.

Year	Film	Category	Outcome	Ref
1969	Uyarndha Manithan	Best Female Playback Singer	Won	
1970	Savaale Samali	Best Female Playback Singer	Won	

=== Tamil Nadu State Film Awards ===
State Film Awards 3 times for the Best Female Playback by the Government of Tamil Nadu.|

Year	Film	Category	Outcome	Ref
1969	Uyarndha Manithan; Lakshmi Kalyanam	Best Female Playback	Won	
1981	Anbulla Atthaan	Best Female Playback	Won	
1989	Varam	Best Female Playback	Won	

== List of Tamil film discography ==
=== 1950s ===
Year	Film	Song	Composer(s)	Writer(s)	Co-artist(s)
1953	Chandirani	"Anbaai Dhesamenggum Ondraai Koodi"	M. S. Viswanathan, C. R. Subburaman	K. D. Santhanam	C. R. Subburaman, chorus
1953	Petra Thai	"Yedhukky Azhathaai Yedhukku"	P. Nageswara Rao	M. S. Subramaniam	A. M. Rajah
1953	Manam Pola Mangalyam	"Aavadhum Pennale"	Addepalli Rama Rao	Kanaka Surabhi	V. J. Varma
1954	Panam Padutham Padu	" "En Nenjin Premai Geetham"	T. A. Kalyanam	N/A	A. M. Rajah
1955	Anarkali	"Andha Naal Thanidhada"	P. Adinarayana Rao	Thanjai N. Ramaiah Dass	solo
1955	Thiruttu Raman (D)	"Bale Saadhu Engal Baabuji"	P. Nageswara Rao	Kanaga Surabhi	solo
1955	Thiruttu Raman (D)	"Thrinjukko Baabu Ippove Thrinjukko Baabu"	P. Nageswara Rao	Kannadasan	solo
1955	Thiruttu Raman (D)	"Endhan Kaadhalum Malaraadhaa Solvaai Raajaa"	P. Nageswara Rao	Kannadasan	solo
1955	Thiruttu Raman (D)	"Balagopala"	P. Nageswara Rao	Jayadeva	solo
1955	Chella Pillai	"Thaannalae Varum Kaasu"	R. Sudarsanam	N/A	solo
1955	Chella Pillai	"Aararo Aararo.... Koil Kaalai" "Nee Paaapaa"	R. Sudarsanam	N/A	T. M. Soundararajan, A. L. Raghavan
1955	Jayasimman	"N/A"	T. V. Raju	N/A	solo
1955	Kanavane Kankanda Deivam	"Enthan Ullam Thulli"	Addepalli Rama Rao	Ku. Ma. Balasubramaniam	solo
1955	Kanavane Kankanda Deivam	"Unnai Kann Theduthe"	Addepalli Rama Rao	Ku. Ma. Balasubramaniam	solo
1955	Kanavane Kankanda Deivam	"Anbil Malarntha Nal Roja"	Addepalli Rama Rao	Ku. Ma. Balasubramaniam	solo
1955	Kanavane Kankanda Deivam	"Oh Madha Vantharul"	Addepalli Rama Rao	Ku. Ma. Balasubramaniam	solo
1955	Kanavane Kankanda Deivam	"Intha Veenkobam"	Addepalli Rama Rao	P. Leela	
1955	Koteeswaran	"Ulaavum Thendral Nilaavai"	S. V. Venkataraman	Thanjai N. Ramaiah Dass	A. M. Rajah
1955	Koteeswaran	"Palikumaa, Kanavuthaan Palikumaa"	S. V. Venkataraman	Thanjai N. Ramaiah Dass	solo
1955	Koteeswaran	"Yaazhum Kuzhalum"	S. V. Venkataraman	T. K. Sundara Vathiyar	A. M. Rajah
1955	Vedan Kannappa	"N/A"	R. Sudarsanam	N/A	solo
1956	Amara Deepam	"Thenunnum Vandu Maamalarai Kandu"	T. Chalapathi Rao	K. P. Kamatchi Sundharam	A. M. Rajah
1956	Marma Veeran	"Pavazha Naattu Ellaiyile Mullai Aadudhu"	M. Ranga Rao and Vedha	Villiputhan	K. Rani
1956	Marma Veeran	"Vizhi Pesuthe Vilaiyaadudhe"	M. Ranga Rao and Vedha	A. L. Narayanan	solo
1956	Pennin Perumai	"Thazhuvadha Illai Sirippadha"	B. N. Rao, A. Rama Rao	Thanjhai N. Ramaiah Dass	T. M. Soundararajan
1956	Pennin Perumai	"Mudiyumaa Adhu Mudiyumaa"	B. N. Rao, A. Rama Rao	Thanjhai N. Ramaiah Dass	
1956	Prema Pasam	"Avanallal Puvi Meethu"	S. Rajeswara Rao	Thajai N. Ramaiah Dass	P. B. Sreenivas
1956	Rangoon Radha	"Ooradangum Velaiyile Ullam Kavarum Solaiyile"	T. R. Pappa	Pattukkottai Kalyanasundaram	solo
1956	Madharkula Manikkam	"Kaadhalin Jyothiytidhu"	N/A	N/A	N/A
1956	Vetri Veeran	"En Mana Raja"	T. M. Ibrahim	N/A	solo
1956	Vetri Veeran	"Enna Mosam Poyinen"	T. M. Ibrahim	N/A	solo
1956	Vetri Veeran	"Nilai Thannai Arivom"	T. M. Ibrahim	N/A	solo
1957	Allavudeenum Arputha Vilakkum	"Kanni Penne Vaa"	S. Hanumantha Rao, S. Rajeswara Rao	A. Maruthakasi	solo
1957	Allavudeenum Arputha Vilakkum	"Aasaiyudane En Raja Varuvaar"	S. Hanumantha Rao, S. Rajeswara Rao	A. Maruthakasi	solo
1957	Allavudeenum Arputha Vilakkum	"Kannukku Nerile, Kalai Enra Perile"	S. Hanumantha Rao, S. Rajeswara Rao	Pattukkottai Kalyanasundaram	solo
1957	Allavudeenum Arputha Vilakkum	"Selaadum Neerodai Meedhe"	S. Hanumantha Rao, S. Rajeswara Rao	Kannadasan	A. M. Rajah
1957	Ambikapathy	"Aadattuma Konjam Paadattumaa"	G. Ramanathan	N/A	solo
1957	Anbe Deivam	Inbamellaam Thandharulum	H. R. Padmanabha Sastry, Vijaya Bhaskar	Sundarakannan	solo
1957	Bhaktha Markandeya	"Oru Maanguyil"	Viswanathan–Ramamoorthy	A. Marthakasi	solo
1957	Engal Veettu Mahalakshmi	"Pattanamthaan Pogalaamadi"	Master Venu	N/A	Seerkazhi Govindarajan
1957	Engal Veettu Mahalakshmi	"Aadi Paadi Velai Senjaa"	Master Venu	N/A	Ghantasala
1957	Engal Veettu Mahalakshmi	"Pala Kaalam Vethanai"	Master Venu	N/A	solo
1957	Engal Veettu Mahalakshmi	"Pollaadha Payalai Serthida Maattom"	Master Venu	N/A	K. Rani
1957	Engal Veettu Mahalakshmi	"Kaatthaadi Kaatthaadi"	Master Venu	N/A	K. Rani
1957	Iru Sagodharigal	"Thanga Chilaiye Vaadaa"	S. Rajeswara Rao	Thanjai N. Ramaiah Dass.	solo
1957	Iru Sagodharigal	"Joraana Roobame"	S. Rajeswara Rao	Thanjai N. Ramaiah Dass.	solo
1957	Iru Sagodharigal	"Oho Kaadhalinaal Pedhamillaadha"	S. Rajeswara Rao	Thanjai N. Ramaiah Dass.	solo
1957	Mahadhevi	"Kanmoodum Velaiyilum"	Viswanathan–Ramamoorthy	Kannadasan	A. M. Rajan
1957	Magathala Nattu Mary	"Parandhu Sellum Venpuraavum"	R. Parthasarathy	Kamdadasan	solo
1957	Magathala Nattu Mary	"Kannaadi Naan Oru Kannaadi"	R. Parthasarathy	Naavarasu	solo
1957	Manaalane Mangaiyin Baakkiyam	"Thesulaavudhe Then Malaraale"	P. Adinarayana Rao	Thanjai N. Ramaiah Dass	Ghantasala
1957	Manaalane Mangaiyin Baakkiyam	"Azhaikkaadhe Ninaikkaadhe"	P. Adinarayana Rao	Thanjai N. Ramaiah Dass	solo
1957	Manaalane Mangaiyin Baakkiyam	"Jegadheeswaraa"	P. Adinarayana Rao	Thanjai N. Ramaiah Dass	solo
1957	Manaalane Mangaiyin Baakkiyam	"Neeye En Vaazhvin Nidhiyaagume"	P. Adinarayana Rao	Thanjai N. Ramaiah Dass	solo
1957	Manaalane Mangaiyin Baakkiyam	"Joraana Bommai Paarungga"	P. Adinarayana Rao	Thanjai N. Ramaiah Dass	solo
1957	Manaalane Mangaiyin Baakkiyam	"Dheva Dhayai Puriya Vaa"	P. Adinarayana Rao	Thanjai N. Ramaiah Dass	solo
1957	Manaalane Mangaiyin Baakkiyam	"Kanee Nee Vaadaa Kaniye Nee"	P. Adinarayana Rao	Thanjai N. Ramaiah Dass	M. S. Rama Rao
1957	Pudhaiyal	"Vinnodum Mugilodum"	Viswanathan–Ramamoorthy	M. K. Athmanathan	C. S. Jayaraman
1957	Pudhaiyal	"Thanga Mohana Thaamaraiye"	Viswanathan–Ramamoorthy	M. K. Athmanathan	Solo
1957	Pudhaiyal	"Chinna Chinna Izhai"	Viswanathan–Ramamoorthy	Pattukkottai Kalyanasundaram	Solo
1957	Pudhaiyal	"Nallakalam Varugudhu"	Viswanathan–Ramamoorthy	Mahakavi Subramania Bharathiyar	T. M. Soundararajan
1957	Pudhaiyal	"Aasai Kaathalai"	A. Maruthakasi	A. M. Rajan	Solo
1957	Pudhumai Pithan	"Then Madhuvai Vandinam"	G. Ramanathan	Thanjai N. Ramaiah Dass	solo
1957	Samaya Sanjeevi	"Sindhikkum Thanmai Attradhaalaa"	G. Ramanathan	A. Maruthakasi	solo
1957	Thangamalai Ragasiyam	"Iga Logame Inidhaagume"	Viswanathan–Ramamoorthy	Ku. Ma. Balasubramaniam	Solo
1957	Yaar Paiyyan	"Thandhai Yaaro Thaayum Yaaro"	Susarla Dakshinamurthi	A. Maruthakasi	solo
1957	Vanangamudi	"Rajayogame"	G. Ramanathan	Thanjai N. Ramaiah Dass	solo
1957	Vanangamudi	"Ennai Pol Pennallavo"	G. Ramanathan	Thanjai N. Ramaiah Dass	solo
1957	Vanangamudi	"Mogana Punnagai"	G. Ramanathan	Thanjai N. Ramaiah Dass	T. M. Soundararajan
1957	Vanangamudi	"Vaazhvinile Vaazhvinile"	G. Ramanathan	Thanjai N. Ramaiah Dass	A. M. Rajah
1958	Anbu Engey	"Ethanai Kodi Panam"	Vedha	Kannadasan	solo
1958	Kathavarayan	"Niraiveruma Ennam Niraiveruma"	G. Ramanathan	Thanjai N. Ramaiah Dass	T. M. Soundararajan
1958	Avan Amaran	"Kaalanaa Minjaadhaiyaa Kaalanaa Minjaadhaiyaa"	T. M. Ibrahim	A. Maruthakasi	Seerkazhi Govindarajan, chorus
1958	Bhooloka Rambai	"Arasakumara Bhuvanendrane"	C. N. Pandurangan	Mugavai Rajamanickam	S. Janaki & Group
1958	Bhooloka Rambai	"Vaazhvil Nee Manimagudam"	C. N. Pandurangan	Villiputhan	solo
1958	Bhooloka Rambai	"Jeeva Gaana Veena Naan"	C. N. Pandurangan	Villiputhan	solo
1958	Bhooloka Rambai	"Un Kanniladum Jaalam Yaavum"	C. N. Pandurangan	Villiputhan	A. M. Rajah
1959	Bhagya Devathai	"Kokkarako Koovidichammaa"	Master Venu	Thanjai N. Ramaiah Dass	solo
1959	Bhagya Devathai	"O Maathaa ... Thanjamendren"	Master Venu	Thanjai N. Ramaiah Dass	solo
1959	Bhagya Devathai	"Illara Poongaavile Inaindhu Aadum"	Master Venu	Thanjai N. Ramaiah Dass	Ghantasala
1959	Kalyana Parisu	"Mangayar Mugathil"	A. M. Rajah	Pattukkottai Kalyanasundaram	K. Jamuna Rani, Chorus
1959	Kalyana Parisu	"Aasaiyinaale Manam"	A. M. Rajah	Pattukkottai Kalyanasundaram	A. M. Rajah
1959	Kalyana Parisu	"Kaathalile Tholviyutraal"	A. M. Rajah	Pattukkottai Kalyanasundaram	A. M. Rajah
1959	Kalyana Parisu	"Vaadikkai Maranthathum"	A. M. Rajah	Pattukkottai Kalyanasundaram	A. M. Rajah
1959	Kalyana Parisu	"Unnaikkandu Naanada"	A. M. Rajah	Pattukkottai Kalyanasundaram	solo
1959	Manjal Mahimai	"Anbinaal Ondrai Neengal"	Master Venu	Udumalai Narayana Kavi	Udutha Sarojini & group
1959	Manjal Mahimai	"Iduvenna Aanandamo"	Master Venu	Udumalai Narayana Kavi	solo
1959	Manjal Mahimai	"Undenbeeraa Ille Poi Enbeera"	Master Venu	Udumalai Narayana Kavi	P. Leela, P. Susheela
1959	Manjal Mahimai	"Kodai Maraindhaal Inbam Varum"	Master Venu	Udumalai Narayana Kavi	Ghantasala
1959	Manjal Mahimai	"Aagaaya Veedhiyil Azhagaana Vennilaa"	Master Venu	Udumalai Narayana Kavi	Ghantasala
1959	Manjal Mahimai	"Maaraadha Sogam Thaano"	Master Venu	Udumalai Narayana Kavi	Ghantasala
1959	Naatukoru Nallaval	"Vanna Malarodu Konjum"	Master Venu	M. K. Athmanathan	Seergazhi Govindarajan
1959	Naatukoru Nallaval	"En Kaadhalum Niraiverumaa"	Master Venu	M. K. Athmanathan	solo
1959	Naan Sollum Ragasiyam	"Kaanadha Sorgam Ondru"	G. Ramanathan	A. Maruthakasi	A. M. Raja
1959	Naan Sollum Ragasiyam	"Kandene Unnai Kannaale"	G. Ramanathan	A. Maruthakasi	P. B. Sreenivas
1959	Naan Sollum Ragasiyam	"Thaaye Idhu Nyaayamaa"	G. Ramanathan	A. Maruthakasi	solo
1959	Naan Sollum Ragasiyam	"Kannai Pol Thannai Kaakkum"	G. Ramanathan	A. Maruthakasi	solo
1959	Vaazha Vaitha Deivam	"Kaaveri Thaan Singari"	K. V. Mahadevan		T. M. Soundararajan
1959	Vaazha Vaitha Deivam	"Vennilave Kaadhal Kadhai"	K. V. Mahadevan		solo
1959	Veerapandiya Kattabomman	"Inbam Pongum Vennila"	G. Ramanathan	Ku. Ma. Balasubramaniam	P. B. Sreenivas
1959	Veerapandiya Kattabomman	"Anjatha Singam"	G. Ramanathan	Ku. Ma. Balasubramaniam	Solo
1959	Veerapandiya Kattabomman	"Takku Takku"	G. Ramanathan	Ku. Ma. Balasubramaniam	S. Varalakshmi, A. P. Komala
1959	Bhaaga Pirivinai	"Thangatthile Oru Kurai Irundhaalum"	Viswanathan–Ramamoorthy	Kannadasan	Solo
1959	Sahodhari	"Katti Thangam"	R. Sudarsanam	Kannadasan	solo
1959	Sahodhari	"Nadagam Poal Mudindhade"	R. Sudarsanam	Kannadasan	solo
1959	Thaai Magalukku Kattiya Thaali	"Thanjavooru Bommaiyai Paarunggadi"	T. R. Pappa	Udumalai Narayana Kavi	Seerkazhi Govindarajan, L. R. Eswari, T. M. Soundararajan
1959	Penn Kulathin Pon Vilakku	"Vanakkam Vaanga Maappille"	Master Venu	Villiputhan	Seergazhi Govindarajan
1959	Penn Kulathin Pon Vilakku	"Vizhivaasal Azhagaana Manimandapam"	Master Venu	Villiputhan	Seergazhi Govindarajan

=== 1960s ===
Year	Film	Song	Composer(s)	Writer(s)	Co-artist(s)
1960	Bhatti Vikramarka	"Oh Ezhil Raaja"	T. M. Ibrahim	N/A	Seerkazhi Govindarajan
1960	Bhatti Vikramarka	"Oho Sundharaa"	T. M. Ibrahim	N/A	
1960	Engal Selvi	"Sollathaan Ninaikiren"	K. V. Mahadevan	Kannadasan	solo
1960	Engal Selvi	"Vaarayo Vaarayo"	K. V. Mahadevan	A. Maruthakasi	solo
1960	Engal Selvi	"Sollathan Ninaikiren (version 2)	K. V. Mahadevan	Kannadasan	K. Jamuna Rani & group
1960	Mannathi Mannan	"Kangal Irandum Unnai"	Viswanathan–Ramamoorthy	Kannadasan	solo
1960	Mannathi Mannan	"Kaniya Kaniya Mazhalai Pesum"	Viswanathan–Ramamoorthy	Kannadasan	T. M. Soundararajan
1960	Mannathi Mannan	"Neeyo Nano Yaar Nilave"	Viswanathan–Ramamoorthy	Kannadasan	P. B. Sreenivas, K. Jamuna Rani
1960	Kadavulin Kuzhandhai	"Chinna Chinna Poove"	G. Ramanathan	Ku. Ma. Balasubramaniam	P. B. Sreenivas
1960	Kadavulin Kuzhandhai	"Chinna Chinna Poove"	G. Ramanathan	Ku. Ma. Balasubramaniam	solo
1960	Kadavulin Kuzhandhai	"Kannaa Manam"	G. Ramanathan	Namakkal R. Balu	
1960	Kalathur Kannamma	"Kangalin Vaarthaigal"	R. Sudarsanam	Kannadasan	A. M. Rajah
1960	Kalathur Kannamma	"Aadatha Manamum"	R. Sudarsanam	Kannadasan	A. M. Rajah
1960	Pattaliyin Vetri	"Chingku Chingkune Thulliye Odunggale"	S. Rajeswara Rao	Ka. Mu. Sheriff	solo
1960	Pattaliyin Vetri	"Enddanaalume Naame"	Master Venu	Udumalai Narayana Kavi	Ghantasala
1960	Pattaliyin Vetri	"Uzhavan Munnaalethaan"	Master Venu	Udumalai Narayana Kavi	T. M. Soundararajan
1960	Pattaliyin Vetri	"Pendatti Purushanukku Piriyaadha Bandhame"	Master Venu	Udumalai Narayana Kavi	Swarnalatha & T. V. Rathnam
1960	Patti Vikramathithan	"Oho Sundharaa"	T. M. Ibrahim	N/A	solo
1960	Patti Vikramathithan	"Oh Ezhil Raaja"	T. M. Ibrahim	N/A	Seerkazhi Govindarajan
1960	Pudhiya Pathai	"Innum Yaen Varavillai"	Master Venu	A. Maruthakasi	solo
1960	Pudhiya Pathai	"Muyandraal Pugazh Perave Mudiyaadhaa"	Master Venu	A. Maruthakasi	Jayalakshmi Santhanan
1960	Pudhiya Pathai	"Inba Kanavodu Kan Moodu"	Master Venu	Kannadasan	solo
1960	Raja Desingu	"Kaadhalin Bimbam"	G. Ramanathan	Udumalai Narayana Kavi, Kannadasan, and Thanjai N. Ramaiah Dass	solo
1960	Kuzhandhaigal Kanda Kudiyarasu	"Ammaa Vedhanai ... Amudhe Odi Vaa"	T. G. Lingappa	Ku. Ma. Balasubramaniam	solo
1961	Akbar	"Aatrin Karaithanile"	Naushad	N/A	Solo
1961	Akbar	"Idhu Kalayin Pothey"	Naushad	N/A	Solo
1961	Akbar	"Kadhal Kondaaley Bayamenna"	Naushad	N/A	Solo
1961	Akbar	"Kanavu Kanda Kaadhal"	Naushad	N/A	Solo
1961	Akbar	"Undhan Sabaiyil Endhan Veedhiyil"	Naushad	N/A	Solo
1961	Arasilankumari	"Thillaalangadi Thillaalangadi"	G. Ramanathan	Kannadasan	solo
1961	Arasilankumari	"Aav Aaahaav En Aasai Purave Aav"	G. Ramanathan	Udumalai Narayana Kavi	solo
1961	Arasilankumari	"Oorvalamaaga Maappillai Pennum"	G. Ramanathan	R. Pazhanichami	Soolamangalam Jayalakshmi, T. M. Soundararajan
1961	Kaanal Neer	"Aasai Mozhi Pesa Vaa"	Master Venu	Kannadasan	solo
1961	Kaanal Neer	"O Matha Jaganmatha"	Master Venu	Ku. Ma. Balasubramaniam	solo
1961	Kappalottiya Thamizhan	"Chinnakkuzhandaigal"	G. Ramanathan	Subramania Bharati	solo
1961	Malliyam Mangalam	"Kal Kal Kal Enave Kannan Aadinaan"	T. A. Kalyanam	V. Seetharaman	chorus
1961	Malliyam Mangalam	"Ammaa Ammaa En Aasai Niraiverumaa"	T. A. Kalyanam	Kuyilan	solo
1961	Malliyam Mangalam	"Needhiye Illaiyaa Pengalukke"	T. A. Kalyanam	Kuyilan	solo
1961	Malliyam Mangalam	"Thirumana Porutham Paathaachu"	T. A. Kalyanam	M. K. Athmanathan	A. M. Rajah
1961	Naaga Nandhini	"Thillaanaa Illennaa Thiththikaadhu Veeranna"	R. Sudarsanam	Thanjai N. Ramaiah Dass	solo
1961	Pasamalar	"Engalukkum Kaalam Varum"	Viswanathan–Ramamoorthy	Kannadasan	T. M. Soundararajan
1961	Pasamalar	"Malarnthum Malaradha"	Viswanathan–Ramamoorthy	Kannadasan	T. M. Soundararajan
1961	Pasamalar	"Mayangugiraal"	Viswanathan–Ramamoorthy	Solo	
1961	Pasamalar	"Yaar Yaar Aval"	Viswanathan–Ramamoorthy	P. B. Sreenivas	
1961	Sri Valli	"Chinnanjiru Kuruvigala"	G. Ramanathan	Thanjai N. Ramaiah Dass	chorus
1961	Sri Valli	"Vanthanga Maappillainga"	G. Ramanathan	Thanjai N. Ramaiah Dass	chorus
1961	Sri Valli	"Vannamigum Paravaigalaa"	G. Ramanathan	Thanjai N. Ramaiah Dass	T. M. Soundararajan
1961	Sri Valli	"Yechuputten Naan Yechuputten"	G. Ramanathan	Thanjai N. Ramaiah Dass	Seerkazhi Govindarajan
1961	Sri Valli	"Thaagam Thanindhadhu Anname"	G. Ramanathan	Thanjai N. Ramaiah Dass	Seerkazhi Govindarajan
1961	Sri Valli	"Shanmugaa...Idhayak Koyil Irukka"	G. Ramanathan	Thanjai N. Ramaiah Dass	solo
1962	Annai	"Azhagiya Mithilai"	R. Sudarsanam	Kannadasan	P. B. Sreenivas
1962	Avana Ivan!?	"Kalyaana Tirunaal"	S. Balachander	Ve. Lakshmanan	solo
1962	Nenjil Or Aalayam	"Enna Ninaithu"	Viswanathan–Ramamoorthy	Kannadasan	solo
1962	Nenjil Or Aalayam	"Muthana Muthallavo"	Viswanathan–Ramamoorthy	Kannadasan	solo
1962	Nenjil Or Aalayam	"Sonnathu Neethaana"	Viswanathan–Ramamoorthy	Kannadasan	solo
1962	Nenjil Or Aalayam	"Oruvar Vaazhum Aalaiyam"	Viswanathan–Ramamoorthy	Kannadasan	T. M. Sourdararajan
1962	Nichaya Thamboolam	"Maalai Soodum Mana Naal"	Viswanathan–Ramamoorthy	Kannadasan	solo
1962	Nichaya Thamboolam	"Nethiyile Oru Kunguma Pottu"	Viswanathan–Ramamoorthy	Kannadasan	solo
1962	Nichaya Thamboolam	"Nee Nadanthaal Enna"	Viswanathan–Ramamoorthy	Kannadasan	solo
1962	Pattinathar	"Vakkanai Pesuvathil"	G. Ramanathan	Thanjai N. Ramaiah Dass	solo
1963	Anandha Jodhi	"Kaala Magal"	Viswanathan–Ramamoorthy	Kannadasan	solo
1963	Anandha Jodhi	"Ninaikka Therindha"	Viswanathan–Ramamoorthy	Kannadasan	solo
1963	Anandha Jodhi	"Paniyillatha Margazhiya"	Viswanathan–Ramamoorthy	Kannadasan	T. M. Soundararajan
1963	Anandha Jodhi	"Poiyiley Piranthu"	Viswanathan–Ramamoorthy	Kannadasan	T. M. Soundararajan
1963	Chitor Rani Padmini	"Devi Vithayar Bavani"	G. Ramanathan	Surabhi	solo
1963	Chitor Rani Padmini	"Vaanathil Soozhndhadhu Megam"	G. Ramanathan	A. Maruthakasi	solo
1963	Chitor Rani Padmini	"Chittu Sirippadhu Pole"	G. Ramanathan	Kannadasan	Seerkazhi Govindarajan
1963	Kunkhumam	"Kaalangal Thorum"	K. V. Mahadevan	Kannadasan	solo
1963	Kunkhumam	"Kungumam"	K. V. Mahadevan	Kannadasan	Soolamangalam Rajalakshmi
1963	Kunkhumam	"Poonthotta Kavalkara"	K. V. Mahadevan	Kannadasan	T. M. Soundararajan
1963	Kunkhumam	"Thoongadha Kannendru"	K. V. Mahadevan	Kannadasan	T. M. Soundararajan
1963	Karpagam	"Athai Madi Methaiyadi"	Viswanathan–Ramamoorthy	Vaali	solo
1963	Karpagam	"Aayiram Iravugal Varuvathundu"	Viswanathan–Ramamoorthy	Vaali	solo
1963	Karpagam	"Pakkathu Veettu Paruva Machaan"	Viswanathan–Ramamoorthy	Vaali	solo
1963	Karpagam	"Mannavane Azhalama Kanneerai"	Viswanathan–Ramamoorthy	Vaali	solo
1963	Periya Idathu Penn	"Andru Vandhadhum (Happy)"	Viswanathan–Ramamoorthy	Kannadasan	T. M. Soundararajan
1963	Periya Idathu Penn	"Andru Vandhadhum (Pathos)"	Viswanathan–Ramamoorthy	Kannadasan	T. M. Soundararajan
1963	Periya Idathu Penn	"Thulli Odum Kaalgal"	Viswanathan–Ramamoorthy	Kannadasan	T. M. Soundararajan
1963	Periya Idathu Penn	"Kattodu Kuzhalaada"	Viswanathan–Ramamoorthy	Kannadasan	T. M. Soundararajan, L. R. Eswari
1963	Periya Idathu Penn	"Ragasiyam Parama"	Viswanathan–Ramamoorthy	Kannadasan	Solo
1964	Arunagirinathar	"Nilavo Aval"	G. Ramanathan	T. K. Krishnasamy	T. M. Soundararajan
1964	Arunagirinathar	"Penn Piranha Pavathai"	G. Ramanathan	T. K. Krishnasamy	solo
1964	Bommai	"Engo Pirandhavaraam"	S. Balachander	Ve. Lakshmanan	solo
1964	Bommai	"Nee Thaan Selvam Nee Thaan Amudham"	S. Balachander	Ve. Lakshmanan	solo
1964	Pachai Vilakku	"Kuththu Vilakkeria"	Viswanathan–Ramamoorthy	Kannadasan	T. M. Soundararajan
1964	Pachai Vilakku	"Thoothu Solla"	Viswanathan–Ramamoorthy	Kannadasan	L. R. Eswari
1964	Pachai Vilakku	"Aval Melai Sirithaal"	Viswanathan–Ramamoorthy	Kannadasan	Solo
1964	Poompuhar	"Iraiva Iraiva"	R. Sudarsanam	Alangudi Somu	solo
1964	Poompuhar	Pottirunthum"	R. Sudarsanam	Alangudi Somu	solo
1964	Poompuhar	"Thamizh Engal Uyiranathu"	R. Sudarsanam	Mayavanathan	solo
1964	Poompuhar	"Kaaviri Penne"	R. Sudarsanam	Mayavanathan	T. M. Soundararajan
1964	Padagotti	"Azhagu Oru Ragam"	Viswanathan–Ramamoorthy	Vaali	Solo
1964	Padagotti	"Ennai Eduthu"	Viswanathan–Ramamoorthy		Solo
1964	Padagotti	"Paattukku Patteduthu"	Viswanathan–Ramamoorthy	T. M. Soundararajan	
1964	Padagotti	"Thottal Poo Malarum"	Viswanathan–Ramamoorthy	T. M. Soundararajan	
1964	Server Sundaram	"Silai Edutthan Oru"	Viswanathan–Ramamoorthy	Kannadasan	solo
1964	Server Sundaram	"Poga Poga Theriyum	Viswanathan–Ramamoorthy	Kannadasan	P. B. Sreenivas
1964	Server Sundaram	"Thatthai Nenjam	Viswanathan–Ramamoorthy	Kannadasan	Sadan
1964	Server Sundaram	"Paattondru Tharuvaar"	Viswanathan–Ramamoorthy	Kannadasan	L. R. Eswari
1964	Kai Kodutha Deivam	"Mangala Melam"	Viswanathan–Ramamoorthy	Kannadasan	solo
1964	Kai Kodutha Deivam	"Kulunga Kulunga Sirikkum"	Viswanathan–Ramamoorthy	Kannadasan	L. R. Eswari
1965	Ennathan Mudivu	"Ponna Petha"	R. Sudarsanam	Kothamangalam Subbu and Mayavannathan	solo
1965	Kalangarai Vilakkam	"Ennai Marandhadhaen"	M. S. Viswanathan	Panchu Arunachalam	solo
1965	Kalangarai Vilakkam	"Ponnezhil Pootadu"	M. S. Viswanathan	Bharathidasan	T. M. Soundararajan
1965	Kalangarai Vilakkam	"Sange MuzhanSomu	M. S. Viswanathan	Bharathidasan	Sirkazhi Govindarajan and chorus
1965	Karthigai Deepam	"Enna Paravai"	R. Sudarsanam	Alangudi Somu	solo
1965	Kavyamela	"Irul Paadhi, Oli Paadhi Amaiththaan"	V. Dakshinamoorthy	N/A	solo
1965	Kavyamela	"Devi Sri Devi"	V. Dakshinamoorthy	N/A	solo
1965	Kavyamela	"Thiththikkum Muththamizhe"	V. Dakshinamoorthy	N/A	T. M. Soundararajan
1965	Kula Deivam	"Kottupotta Pota Chinna Machane"	R. Sudarsanam	N/A	solo
1965	Naanum Oru Penn	"Poopola Poopola"	R. Sudarshanam	Panchu Arunachalam	T. M. Soundararajan
1965	Naanum Oru Penn	"Kannukkul"	R. Sudarshanam	V. Seetharaman	T. M. Soundararajan
1965	Naanum Oru Penn	"Kanna Karumai"	R. Sudarshanam	Kannadasan	solo
1965	Naanum Oru Penn	"Emara Sonnathu"	R. Sudarshanam	Ku. Ma. Balasubramaniam	solo
1965	Kadhalikka Neramillai	"Nenjathai Alli"	Viswanathan–Ramamoorthy	Kannadasan	L. R. Eswari, K. J. Yesudas
1965	Kadhalikka Neramillai	"Enna Paarvai"	Viswanathan–Ramamoorthy	Kannadasan	K. J. Yesudas
1965	Kadhalikka Neramillai	"Anubhavam Pudhumai"	Viswanathan–Ramamoorthy	Kannadasan	P. B. Srinivas
1965	Kadhalikka Neramillai	"Naalaam Naalaam"	Viswanathan–Ramamoorthy	Kannadasan	P. B. Srinivas
1965	Neerkumizhi	"Kanni Nadhiyoram"	V. Kumar	Alangudi Somu	T. M. Soundararajan
1965	Neerkumizhi	"Neeril Neendhidum"	V. Kumar	Alangudi Somu	Solo
1965	Anbu Karangal	"Azhakenna Arivenna"	R. Sudarsanam	Vaali	solo
1965	Anbu Karangal	"Raamanukke Seethai"	R. Sudarsanam	Vaali	solo
1965	Anbu Karangal	"Iravu Mudinthuvidum"	R. Sudarsanam	Vaali	P. B. Srinivas
1965	Panchavarna Kili	"Vaa Vaa Kannan Varuvaan"	Viswanathan–Ramamoorthy	Vaali	solo
1965	Panchavarna Kili	"Tamizhukkum Amudhendru Per"	Viswanathan–Ramamoorthy	Bharathidasan	solo
1965	Panchavarna Kili	"Azhagan Muruganidam Aasai Vaithen"	Viswanathan–Ramamoorthy	Vaali	solo
1965	Poomalai	"Kattai Viral"	R. Sudarsanam	Kumaradevan	solo
1965	Poomalai	"Un Ennathai"	R. Sudarsanam	Kavi Rajagopal	T. M. Soundararajan
1965	Santhi	"Nenjathile Nee"	Viswanathan–Ramamoorthy	Kannadasan	solo
1965	Santhi	"Oorengum Mappillai"	Viswanathan–Ramamoorthy	Kannadasan	solo
1965	Santhi	"Senthur Murugan" (2)	Viswanathan–Ramamoorthy	Kannadasan	solo
1965	Santhi	"Theredu Silaiyedu"	Viswanathan–Ramamoorthy	Kannadasan	solo
1965	Santhi	"Senthur Murugan"	Viswanathan–Ramamoorthy	Kannadasan	P. B. Sreenivas
1965	Vennira Aadai	"Ammamma Kaatru Vandhu"	Viswanathan–Ramamoorthy	Kannadasan	solo
1965	Vennira Aadai	"Enna Enna Vaarththaigalo"	Viswanathan–Ramamoorthy	Kannadasan	solo
1965	Vennira Aadai	"Kannan Ennum Mannan Engae"	Viswanathan–Ramamoorthy	Kannadasan	solo
1965	Vennira Aadai	"Neeraadum Kangal"	Viswanathan–Ramamoorthy	Kannadasan	solo
1965	Vennira Aadai	"Oruvan Kaadhalan"	Viswanathan–Ramamoorthy	Kannadasan	P. B. Sreenivas
1966	Mani Magudam	"Aathavan Uthiththaan"	R. Sudarsanam	Kannadasan	T. M. Soundararajan
1966	Mani Magudam	"Thathi Sellum"	R. Sudarsanam	Vaali	T. M. Soundararajan
1966	Mani Magudam	"O Ho Paar Intha Pakkam"	R. Sudarsanam	Vaali	solo
1966	Naam Moovar	"Adi lalla Lalla Ellam Vaarungadi"	S. M. Subbaiah Naidu	Vaali	T. M. Soundararajan
1966	Naam Moovar	"Vayathu Vandha Pennai"	S. M. Subbaiah Naidu	Vaali	T. M. Soundararajan
1966	Naam Moovar	"Andru Ninaithom Atharko"	S. M. Subbaiah Naidu	Vaali	T. M. Soundararajan
1966	Thattungal Thirakkappadum	"Thittippadhu Edhu"	M. S. Viswanathan	Kannadasan	solo
1966	Thattungal Thirakkappadum	"Kalyana Panthal Alangaram"	M. S. Viswanathan	Kannadasan	solo
1966	Thattungal Thirakkappadum	"Oor Paadum Thaalaattu"	M. S. Viswanathan	Kannadasan	solo
1966	Muharasi	"Enakkum Unakkumtham"	K. V. Mahadevan	Kannadasan	T. M. Soundararajan
1966	Muharasi	"Enna Enna"	K. V. Mahadevan	Kannadasan	T. M. Soundararajan
1966	Muharasi	"Mugathai Kaatti"	K. V. Mahadevan	Kannadasan	T. M. Soundararajan
1966	Muharasi	"Thanner"	K. V. Mahadevan	Kannadasan	solo
1966	Madras to Pondicherry	"Enna Enthan"	T. K. Ramamoorthy	Namakkal Varadarajan	T. M. Soundararajan
1966	Madras to Pondicherry	"Engey Payanam"	T. K. Ramamoorthy	Alangudi Somu	T. M. Soundararajan
1966	Madras to Pondicherry	"Hello My Friend Nenjathil Enna"	T. K. Ramamoorthy	Thanjai Vaanan	solo
1966	Kathal Paduthum Padu	"Alli Chendathuthe"	T. R. Pappa	Panchu Arunachalam	
1966	Kathal Paduthum Padu	"Ivaloru Azhagiya"	T. R. Pappa	Mayavanathan	T. M. Soundararajan
1966	Kathal Paduthum Padu	"Kangalilrandil"	T. R. Pappa	M. K. Athmanathan	S. Janaki
1966	Kathal Paduthum Padu	"Meladai Katrada"	T. R. Pappa	Mayavanathan	
1966	Kathal Paduthum Padu	"Velli Nila"	T. R. Pappa	Alangudi Somu	
1967	Thaikku Thalaimagan	"Parthu Kondathu Kannukku"	K.V. Mahadevan	Kannadasan	T. M. Soundararajan
1967	Thaikku Thalaimagan	"Vazha Vendum Manam"	K.V. Mahadevan	Kannadasan	T. M. Soundararajan
1967	Vivasayee	"Ennama Singara"	K.V. Mahadevan	Udumalai Narayana Kavi	T. M. Soundararajan
1967	Vivasayee	"Ippadithan Irukka Vendum"	K.V. Mahadevan	Udumalai Narayana Kavi	T. M. Soundararajan
1967	Vivasayee	"Kadhal Enthan"	K.V. Mahadevan	Udumalai Narayana Kavi	T. M. Soundararajan
1967	Vivasayee	"Yevaradithum"	K.V. Mahadevan	Udumalai Narayana Kavi	solo
1967	Bhakta Prahlada	"Kili Vandhu Kothaada Koyyaa"	S. Rajeswara Rao	Vaali	solo
1967	Bhakta Prahlada	"Raajan Maharaajane"	S. Rajeswara Rao	Vaali	solo
1967	Bhakta Prahlada	"Hey Jothi Swaroopa"	S. Rajeswara Rao	Ku. Ma. Balasubramaniam	S. Janaki
1967	Bhakta Prahlada	"Unnai Nambi Un Patham Thuthithe"	S. Rajeswara Rao	Thiruchi Thiyagarajan	solo
1967	Bhakta Prahlada	"Lakshmi Vallabha Dheena Dhayalaa"	S. Rajeswara Rao	Thiruchi Thiyagarajan	solo
1967	Bhakta Prahlada	"Jeevanum Neeye Aiyaa"	S. Rajeswara Rao	Thiruchi Thiyagarajan	solo
1967	Bhakta Prahlada	"Aazhi Soozh Vannaa"	S. Rajeswara Rao	Thiruchi Thiyagarajan	chorus
1967	Bhakta Prahlada	"Irul Niraindhadhaai Irukkum"	S. Rajeswara Rao	V. Seetharaman	solo
1967	Bhakta Prahlada	"Karunai Serndha Manadhu"	S. Rajeswara Rao	V. Seetharaman	solo
1967	Bhakta Prahlada	"Endhan Uyir Thandha Hari"	S. Rajeswara Rao	V. Seetharaman	solo
1967	Bhakta Prahlada	"Vaazhgave Mannulagum Vinnulagum"	S. Rajeswara Rao	V. Seetharaman	S. Janaki, Soolamangalam Rajalakshmi
1967	Bhakta Prahlada	"Om Namo Narayana"	S. Rajeswara Rao	Alangudi Somu	chorus
1967	Paaladai	"Engey Engey En Kannukku"	K.V. Mahadevan	Kannadasan	T. M. Soundararajan
1967	Paaladai	"Appadi Enna Parvai"	K.V. Mahadevan	Kannadasan	Solo
1967	Paaladai	"Pattadai Thottil"	K.V. Mahadevan	Kannadasan	Solo
1967	Thangai	"Sugam Sugam Adhu"	M. S. Viswanathan	Kannadasan	solo
1968	En Thambi	"Adiyai Nettru Pirandaval"	M. S. Viswanathan	Kannadasan	T. M. Soundararajan
1968	En Thambi	"Ayyaiya Mella Thattu"	M. S. Viswanathan	Kannadasan	T. M. Soundararajan
1968	Chakkaram	"Kulikka Pora Kumaripponnu"	S. M. Subbaiah Naidu	Vaali	T. M. Soundararajan
1968	Chakkaram	"Neeye Oru Neram Sollu"	S. M. Subbaiah Naidu	Vaali	T. M. Soundararajan
1968	Uyarndha Manithan	"Aththaanin Muththangal"	M. S. Viswanathan	Vaali	Solo
1968	Uyarndha Manithan	"Aththai Magal"	M. S. Viswanathan	Vaali	Solo
1968	Uyarndha Manithan	"Paal Polave"	M. S. Viswanathan	Vaali	Solo
1968	Uyarndha Manithan	"En Kelvikkenna Badhil"	M. S. Viswanathan	Vaali	T. M. Soundararajan
1968	Uyarndha Manithan	"Velli Kinnamthan"	M. S. Viswanathan	Vaali	T. M. Soundararajan
1968	Puthiya Bhoomi	"Vizhiye Vizhiye"	M. S. Viswanathan	Kannadasan	T. M. Soundararajan
1968	Puthiya Bhoomi	"Chinnavalai Mugam"	M. S. Viswanathan	Kannadasan	T. M. Soundararajan
1968	Puthiya Bhoomi	"Nethiyile Pottu"	M. S. Viswanathan	Kannadasan	Solo
1968	Puthiya Bhoomi	"Naanthandi Kaathi"	M. S. Viswanathan	Poovai Senguttavan	L. R. Eswari
1968	Kuzhanthaikkaga	"Thai Maatha Megam"	M. S. Viswanathan	Kannadasan	Solo
1968	Kuzhanthaikkaga	"Thottu Paarungal"	M. S. Viswanathan	Kannadasan	Solo
1968	Kuzhanthaikkaga	"Thai Maatha Megam – 2"	M. S. Viswanathan	Kannadasan	Tharapuram Soundararajan, A. Veeramani
1969	Iru Kodugal	"Punnagai Mannan"	V. Kumar	Vaali	K. Jamuna Rani
1969	Iru Kodugal	"Kavidhai Ezhudhiya"	V. Kumar	Vaali	P. Leela
1969	Nirai Kudam	"Deva Deva"	V. Kumar	Kannadasan	T. M. Soundararajan, Soolamangalam Rajalakshmi, K. Jamuna Rani
1969	Nirai Kudam	"Kannoru Pakkam"	V. Kumar	Kannadasan	T. M. Soundararajan
1969	Aayiram Poi	"Pulavar Sonnathum Poiye"	V. Kumar	Kannadasan	T. M. Soundararajan
1969	Aayiram Poi	"Thillaiyile Sabapathi Chithambarathil"	V. Kumar	Kannadasan	
1969	Naangu Killadigal	"Sevvaanathil Oru Natchathiram"	Vedha	A. L. Narayanan, Kannadadan	T. M. Soundararajan
1969	Naangu Killadigal	"Nenjikku Nimmathi"	Vedha	A. L. Narayanan, Kannadadan	solo
1969	Naangu Killadigal	"Ethu Ethile"	Vedha	A. L. Narayanan, Kannadadan	L. R. Eswari
1969	Nam Naadu	"Aadai Muzhudhum"	M. S. Viswanathan	Vaali	Solo
1969	Nam Naadu	"Vangaya Vathyaraiya"	M. S. Viswanathan	Vaali	T. M. Soundararajan
1969	Ponnu Mappollai	"Naalaa Naalaa Palanaalaa"	Vedha	Thanjai Vanan, Kannadasan	T. M. Soundararajan
1969	Ponnu Mappollai	"Sirittha Mugam Sivandhadhenna"	Vedha	Thanjai Vanan, Kannadasan	T. M. Soundararajan
1969	Shanti Nilayam	"Iyarkai Ennum"	M. S. Viswanathan	Kannadadan	S. P. Balasubrahmanyam
1969	Shanti Nilayam	"Kadavul Orunaal"	M. S. Viswanathan	Kannadadan	solo
1969	Shanti Nilayam	"Selvangale"	M. S. Viswanathan	Kannadadan	solo
1969	Shanti Nilayam	"Iraivan Varuvaan"	M. S. Viswanathan	Kannadadan	solo
1969	Thirudan	"En Aasai Ennodu"	M. S. Viswanathan	Kannadasan	solo
1969	Kuzhandai Ullam	"Angum Ingum Ondre"	S. P. Kodandapani	Kannadasan	Renuka
1969	Kuzhandai Ullam	"Muthu Chippikkulle"	S. P. Kodandapani	Kannadasan	S. P. Balasubrahmanyam
1969	Kuzhandai Ullam	"Poomarathu Nizhalumundu"	S. P. Kodandapani	Kannadasan	S. Janaki
1969	Kuzhandai Ullam	"Kudagu Naadu Ponni"	S. P. Kodandapani	Kannadasan	Sirkazhi Govindarajan
1969	Anbalippu	"Gopalan Enge Undo"	M. S. Viswanathan	Kannadasan	T. M. Soundararajan, L. R. Eswari, Sirkazhi Govindarajan & Tharapuram Sundararajan
1969	Anbalippu	"Vallimalai Maankutty"	M. S. Viswanathan	Kannadasan	T. M. Soundararajan
1969	Anbalippu	"Madhulam Pazhathukku"	M. S. Viswanathan	Kannadasan	P. B. Srinivas

=== 1970s ===
Year	Film	Song	Composer(s)	Writer(s)	Co-artist(s)
1970	CID Shankar	"Naanathale Kannam"	Vedha	Kannadasan	T. M. Soundararajan
1970	CID Shankar	"Brinthavanthil Poo"	Vedha	Kannadasan	T. M. Soundararajan
1970	CID Shankar	"Thaipoosa Thirunalile"	Vedha	Kannadasan	solo
1970	Nadu Iravil	"Kann Kattum Jadaiyile"	S. Balachander	Ve. Laxmanan	solo
1970	Nadu Iravil	"Kann Kattum Jadiyile" (pathos)	S. Balachander	Ve. Laxmanan	solo
1970	Thedi Vandha Mappillai	"Idamo Sugamanathu (Naalu Pakkam Suvaru)"	M. S. Viswanathan	Vaali	T. M. Soundararajan
1970	Thedi Vandha Mappillai	"Ada Aarumugam"	M. S. Viswanathan	Vaali	T. M. Soundararajan
1970	Thedi Vandha Mappillai	"Maanikkka Theril Maragatha"	M. S. Viswanathan	Kannadasan	T. M. Soundararajan
1970	Nadu Iravil	"Kann Kattum Jadaiyile"	S. Balachander	Ve. Laxmanan	solo
1970	Nadu Iravil	"Kann Kattum Jadiyile" (pathos)	S. Balachander	Ve. Laxmanan	solo
1970	Enga Mama	"Ennanga Sollunga"	M. S. Viswanathan	Vaali	T. M. Soundararajan
1970	Enga Mama	"Paavai Paavai Aasai"	M. S. Viswanathan	Vaali	solo
1970	Sorgam	"Oru Muttharathil"	M. S. Viswanathan	Kannadasan	Solo
1970	Engal Thangam	"Thangapadkathin"	M. S. Viswanathan	Vaali	T. M. Soundararajan
1970	Engal Thangam	"Naan Alavodu Rasipavan"	M. S. Viswanathan	Vaali	T. M. Soundararajan
1971	Justice Viswanathan	"Atthani Mandapathil"	Vedha	Kannadasan	solo
1971	Justice Viswanathan	"Silai Seiya"	Vedha	Kannadasan	T. M. Soundararajan
1971	Justice Viswanathan	"Kann Vazhiye"	Vedha	Kannadasan	T. M. Soundararajan
1971	Justice Viswanathan	"Thanga Surangam"	Vedha	Kannadasan	T. M. Soundararajan
1971	Then Kinnam	"Thenkinnam Thenkinnam"	Shankar–Ganesh	Kumara Devan	Solo
1972	Naan Yen Pirandhen	"Unathu Vizhiyil"	Shankar–Ganesh	Pulamaipithan	T. M. Soundararajan
1972	Naan Yen Pirandhen	"Ennamma Chinna Ponnu"	Shankar–Ganesh	Vaali	T. M. Soundararajan
1972	Vasantha Maligai	"Kalaimagal Kai Porule"	K. V. Mahadevan	Kannadasan	solo
1972	Vasantha Maligai	"Adiyamma Rajathi"	K. V. Mahadevan	Kannadasan	T. M. Soundararajan
1972	Vasantha Maligai	"Mayakkamenna"	K. V. Mahadevan	Kannadasan	T. M. Soundararajan
1972	Raja	"Gangaiyile"	M. S. Viswanathan	Kannadasan	solo
1972	Raja	"Nee Vara Vendum"	M. S. Viswanathan	Kannadasan	T. M. Soundararajan
1973	Sollathan Ninaikkiren	"Pallavi Endru"	M. S. Viswanathan	Vaali	S. Janaki
1973	Thirumalai Deivam	"Malai Manivanna Mayavane"	Kunnakidi Vaidyanathan		solo
1973	Veettukku Vandha Marumagal	"Pennukku Sugham Enbadhum"	Shankar–Ganesh	Kannadasan	T. M. Soundararajan
1973	Arangetram	"Aandavanin Thottathile"	V. Kumar	Kannadasan	
1973	Arangetram	"Moothaval Nee"	V. Kumar	Kannadasan	
1973	Arangetram	"Aaramba Kaalaththil"	V. Kumar	Kannadasan	S. P. Balasubrahmanyam
1973	Ulagam Sutrum Valiban	"Lilly Malarukku"	M. S. Viswanathan	Kannadasan	T. M. Soundararajan
1973	Ulagam Sutrum Valiban	"Oh My Darling"	M. S. Viswanathan	Kannadasan	T. M. Soundararajan
1973	Ulagam Sutrum Valiban	"Pachchaikili"	M. S. Viswanathan	Vaali	T. M. Soundararajan
1973	Ulagam Sutrum Valiban	"Thangath Thoniyile"	M. S. Viswanathan	Vaali	K. J. Yesudas
1973	Ulagam Sutrum Valiban	"Ninaikkum Pothu"	M. S. Viswanathan	Vaali	Solo
1974	Aval Oru Thodar Kathai	"Aadumadi Thottil"	M. S. Viswanathan	Kannadasan	solo
1974	Engamma Sapatham	"Illamai Azhaikindrathu"	Vijaya Bhaskar	Panchu Arunachalam	T. M. Soundararajan
1974	Thangappathakkam	"Nallathoru Kudumbam"	M. S. Viswanathan	Kannadasan	T. M. Soundararajan
1974	En Magan	"Ponnukkenna Azhagu"	M. S. Viswanathan	Kannadasan	T. M. Soundararajan
1974	Netru Indru Naalai	"Nee Ennenna"	M. S. Viswanathan	Pulamaipithan	T. M. Soundararajan
1974	Netru Indru Naalai	"Innoru Vaanam" (Romeo)	M. S. Viswanathan	Kannadasan	T. M. Soundararajan
1974	Netru Indru Naalai	"Nerungi Nerungi"	M. S. Viswanathan	Suratha	T. M. Soundararajan
1974	Dheerga Sumangali	"Ayiram Ayiram"	M. S. Viswanathan	Kannadasan	S. P. Balasubrahmanyam
1974	Dheerga Sumangali	"Deerga"	M. S. Viswanathan	Vaali	solo
1975	Avandhan Manidhan	"Anbu Nadamadum"	M. S. Viswanathan	Kannadasan	T. M. Soundararajan
1975	Ellorum Nallavare	"Sivappukkal"	V. Kumar	Kannadasan	T. M. Soundararajan
1975	Uravukku Kai Koduppom	"Thiruvennum Peyarukku Uriyavale"	D. B. Ramachandran, S. P. Venkatesh	A. Maruthakasi	P. Madhuri, T. K. Kala
1976	Annakili	"Sontham Illai"	Ilaiyaraaja		
1976	Manmadha Leelai	"Sugam Thanaa"	M. S. Viswanathan	Kannadasan	S. P. Balasubrahmanyam
1976	Bhadrakali	"Kannan Oru"	Ilaiyaraaja		
1976	Bhadrakali	"Kettele"	Ilaiyaraaja		
1976	Dasavatharam	"Om Ennum Manthirathan"	S. Rajeswara Rao	N/A	solo
1976	Oorukku Uzhaippavan	"Azhagennum Oviyam"	M. S. Viswanathan	Muthulingam	K. J. Yesudas
1976	Paalooti Valartha Kili	"Vaadiyamma"	Ilaiyaraaja		
1977	16 Vayathinile	"Chavanthi Poo"	Ilaiyaraaja		
1977	Aalukkoru Aasai	"Idhaya Mazhaiyil"	Ilaiyaraaja		
1977	Annan Oru Koyil	"Annan Oru Kovil" (female)	M. S. Viswanathan	Kannadasan	solo
1977	Avar Enakke Sontham	"Thenil Aadum Roja"	Ilaiyaraaja		
1977	Durga Devi	"Naan Aayirakkankali"	Ilaiyaraaja		
1977	Gaayathri	"Aattam Kondattam"	Ilaiyaraaja		
1977	Odi Vilayaadu Thaatha	"Old Ellam Gold"	Ilaiyaraaja		
1977	Pen Jenmam	"Oru Kovilil"	Ilaiyaraaja		
1977	Pen Jenmam	"Vanna Karunkuzhal"	Ilaiyaraaja		
1977	Pen Jenmam	"Chella Pillai Saravanan"	Ilaiyaraaja		
1977	Sainthadamma Sainthadu	"Kannan Enna Sonnan"	Ilaiyaraaja		
1977	Sainthadamma Sainthadu	"Athai Magan"	Ilaiyaraaja		
1977	Sainthadamma Sainthadu	"Oru Kaathal"	Ilaiyaraaja		
1977	Sainthadamma Sainthadu	"Nenjukkul Poo"	Ilaiyaraaja		
1977	Thunai Iruppal Meenakshi	"Sugamo Aayiram"	Ilaiyaraaja		
1977	Thunai Iruppal Meenakshi	"Thanga Thamarai"	Ilaiyaraaja		
1977	Thunai Iruppal Meenakshi	"Vaarthai Illamal"	Ilaiyaraaja		
1978	Achchani	"Naan Azhaikkiren"	Ilaiyaraaja		solo
1978	Achchani	"Thaalaattu"	Ilaiyaraaja		solo
1978	Chittu Kuruvi	"En Kanmani"	Ilaiyaraaja		solo
1978	Chittu Kuruvi	"Ponnula Ponnula"	Ilaiyaraaja		solo
1978	Chittu Kuruvi	"Unna Nambi Nethiyile"	Ilaiyaraaja		solo
1978	Ithu Eppadi Irukku	"Dhinam Dhinam Oru"	Ilaiyaraaja		solo
1978	Kannan Oru Kai Kuzhandhai	"Megame Thoonthaaga"	Ilaiyaraaja		solo
1978	Kannan Oru Kai Kuzhandhai	"Moga Sangeetham"	Ilaiyaraaja		solo
1978	Maariyamman Thiruvizha	"Aaththadi Aaththa Intha"	Ilaiyaraaja		solo
1978	Maariyamman Thiruvizha	"Thanga Kudathukku"	Ilaiyaraaja		solo
1978	Priya	"Darling Darling"	Ilaiyaraaja		solo
1978	Sattam En Kaiyil	"Ore Idam"	Ilaiyaraaja		solo
1978	Thirukkalyanam	"Devathaigal Vazhthuvathu"	Ilaiyaraaja		solo
1978	Vaazha Ninaithathaal Vazhalaam	"Iyarkai Rathangale"	Ilaiyaraaja		solo
1978	Varuvan Vadivelan	"Joyful Singapore"	M. S. Viswanathan	Kannadasan	S. P. Balasubrahmanyam
1978	Varuvan Vadivelan	"Batthu Malai"	M. S. Viswanathan	Kannadasan	Sirkazhi Govindarajan, L. R. Eswari & Bangalore A. R. Ramani Ammal
1979	Annai Oru Aalayam	"Appane Appane"	Ilaiyaraaja		solo
1979	Annai Oru Aalayam	"Nadhiyoram"	Ilaiyaraaja		solo
1979	Annai Oru Aalayam	"Nilavu Neram"	Ilaiyaraaja		solo
1979	Iru Nilavugal	"Anbulla Kannano"	Rajan–Nagendra	Vaali	S. P. Balasubrahmanyam
1979	Lakshmi	"Thena Marathila"	Ilaiyaraaja		solo
1979	Mudhal Iravu	"Manjal Nilaavukku"(Version l)	Ilaiyaraaja		solo
1979	Mudhal Iravu	"Manjal Nilaavukku"(Version ll)	Ilaiyaraaja		solo
1979	Mugathil Mugam Parkalam	"Aasai Nenjin Kanavugal"	Ilaiyaraaja		solo
1979	Ninaithale Inikkum	"Yaathum Oore"	M. S. Viswanathan	Kannadasan	S. P. Balasubrahmanyam
1979	Naan Vazhavaippen	"Thirutheril"	Ilaiyaraaja		solo
1979	Naan Vazhavaippen	"Endhan Ponvanamme"	Ilaiyaraaja		solo
1979	Nallathoru Kudumbam	"Sindhunadhi Karaiyoram"	Ilaiyaraaja		solo
1979	Pattakkathi Bhairavan	"Boot Polish"	Ilaiyaraaja		solo
1979	Pattakkathi Bhairavan	"Nenjukkulle Singakkutti"	Ilaiyaraaja		solo
1979	Pattakkathi Bhairavan	"Varuvai Kannaa"	Ilaiyaraaja		solo
1979	Poonthalir	"Raja Chinna Raja"	Ilaiyaraaja		solo
1979	Thaayillamal Naan Illai	"Vadivelan Manasu Vachaan"	Shankar–Ganesh	Kannadasan	T. M. Soundararajan
1979	Thaayillamal Naan Illai	"Vanakkam Vanakkam	Shankar–Ganesh	Vaali	T. M. Soundararajan, S. C. Krishnan and chorus
1979	Thaayillamal Naan Illai	"Eena Meena"	Shankar–Ganesh	Vaali	solo

=== 1980s ===
Year	Film	Song	Composer(s)	Writer(s)	Co-artist(s)	Note(s)	Ref.
1980	Polladhavan	"Chinnakkannane"	M. S. Viswanathan	Kannadasan	solo		
1980	Rishimoolam	Neramithu Neramithu	Ilaiyaraaja	Kannadasan	T. M. Soundararajan		
1980	Yamanukku Yaman	"Mazhai Vizhundhadhu"	K. Chakravarthy	N/A	S. P. Balasubrahmanyam		
1980	Yamanukku Yaman	"Aathoram Pootha"	K. Chakravarthy	N/A	S. P. Balasubrahmanyam		
1980	Yamanukku Yaman	"Naadaga Sangeetha"	K. Chakravarthy	N/A	S. P. Balasubrahmanyam		
1980	Yamanukku Yaman	"Poo Mottu Ponnu Ithu"	K. Chakravarthy	N/A	S. P. Balasubrahmanyam		
1981	Kilinjalgal	Chinna Chinna	T. Rajendar	T. Rajendar	-		
1982	Ninaivellam Nithya	Kanni Ponnu	Ilaiyaraaja	Vairamuthu	Malaysia Vasudevan	Chatusruti Dhaivata	
1982	Antha Rathirikku Satchi Illai	"Sumaithangiye"	K. V. Mahadevan	Muthulingam	S. P. Balasubrahmanyam		
1983	Adutha Varisu	Pesa Koodathu	Ilaiyaraaja	Panju Arunachalam	S. P. Balasubrahmanyam		
1983	Paayum Puli	"Appakada Annakili"	Ilaiyaraaja	Vaali	Malaysia Vasudevan		
1983	Paayum Puli	"Pothukkittu Oothuthadi"	Ilaiyaraaja	Vaali	Malaysia Vasudevan		
1984	Achamillai Achamillai	"Aavaram Poovu"	V. S. Narasimhan	Vairamuthu	S. P. Balasubrahmanyam		
1984	Achamillai Achamillai	"Odukira Thanniyila"	V. S. Narasimhan	Vairamuthu	Malaysia Vasudevan		
1984	Ambigai Neril Vanthaal	"Annai Thaalaattu"	Ilaiyaraaja				
1984	Anbulla Malare	"Kaadhal Thegangal"	Ilaiyaraaja				
1984	Enakkul Oruvan	"Ther Kondu"	Ilaiyaraaja				
1984	Kai Kodukkum Kai	"Kannukkulle Yaaro"	Ilaiyaraaja		S. P. Sailaja		
1984	Nandri	"Thaai Seitha Paavam"	Shankar–Ganesh	Vaali	solo		
1984	Oh Maane Maane	"Abhiramiye Annaiye"	Ilaiyaraaja		Bangalore Latha		
1984	Vaazhkai	"Mella Mella"	Ilaiyaraaja	M. G. Vallabhan	Seetharaman		
1984	Vaidehi Kathirunthal	"Raasavae Unnai"	Ilaiyaraaja				
1985	Deivapiravi	"Poovai Oru Poo"	Shankar–Ganesh	Vaali	S. P. Balasubrahmanyam		
1985	Deivapiravi	"Nil Nil Nil Nil Elan Thendraley"	Shankar–Ganesh	Vaali	S. P. Balasubrahmanyam		
1985	Deivapiravi	"Panaile Paal Erukku"	Shankar–Ganesh	Vaali	S. P. Balasubrahmanyam		
1985	Deivapiravi	"Mounam Ennam Raagam"	Shankar–Ganesh	Vaali	S. P. Balasubrahmanyam		
1985	Deivapiravi	"Marappu Potta Ponnu"	Shankar–Ganesh	Vaali	Malaysia Vasudevan		
1985	Kalyana Agathigal	"Kalyana Agathigal	V. S. Narasimhan	Vairamuthu	chorus		
1985	Kalyana Agathigal	"Manasukkul"	V. S. Narasimhan	Vairamuthu	Raj Sitaraman		
1985	Kalyana Agathigal	"Kaanal Alaigalile"	V. S. Narasimhan	Vairamuthu	solo		
1985	Naane Raja Naane Mandhiri	Mayanginen Solla	Ilaiyaraaja	Vaali	P. Jayachandran		
1986	Aayiram Pookkal Malarattum	"Aayiram Pathu"	V. S. Narasimhan	N/A	solo		
1986	Mella Thirandhathu Kadhavu	Dil Dil Manathil	Ilaiyaraaja	Vaali	Mano		
1986	Samsaram Adhu Minsaram	Azhagiya Anni	Shankar–Ganesh	Vairamuthu	P. Jayachandran		
1987	Nayakan	Andhi Mazhai	Ilaiyaraaja	Pulamaipithan	T. L. Maharajan	Natabhairavi	
1988	Kan Simittum Neram	"Thane Paduthe Paduthe"	V. S. Narasimhan	Kannadasan, Uma Kannadasan, Tamilmani	solo		
1988	Poonthotta Kaavalkaaran	Sindhiya Venmani	Ilaiyaraaja	Gangai Amaran	K. J. Yesudas	Srothaswini	
1988	Dharmathin Thalaivan	Thenamadurai Vaigai nadhi	Ilaiyaraaja	Vaali	S.P.Balasubramaniam Malaysia Vasudevan		
1989	Nyaya Tharasu	Thodu Vaanam	Shankar–Ganesh	-			
1989	Nyaya Tharasu	Yaarukku Aruthal	Shankar–Ganesh		K. J. Yesudas		
1989	Rajadhi Raja	"Un Nenja Thottu Sollu""	Ilaiyaraaja		K. S. Chithra		
1989	Mupperum Deviyar	"Thirumaal Azhaga"	M. S. Viswanathan	N/A	solo		

=== 1990s ===
Year	Film	Song	Composer(s)	Writer(s)	Co-artist(s)	Note(s)	Ref.
1990	Anbu Chinnam	"Kathuthu Kathuthu Koilpura"	Ilaiyaraaja		-		
1990	Keladi Kanmani	"Kapoora Bommai"	Ilaiyaraaja	Mu. Metha	-		
1990	Mallu Vetti Minor	"Kathirundha Malli"	Ilaiyaraaja		-	Amritavarshini	
1990	Nila Pennae	"Pudhu Uravu"	Vidyasagar				
1990	Paadi Vaa Thendrale	"O Kadhale Un"	S. A. Rajkumar				
1990	Pudhu Vasantham	"Idhu Mudhal"	S. A. Rajkumar	Vaali	S. P. Balasubrahmanyam		
1990	Pudhu Vasantham	"Pattu Onnu"	S. A. Rajkumar	Muthulingam	S. P. Balasubrahmanyam	Sivaranjani	
1990	Puriyaadha Pudhir	"Oor Iravil Kaatru"	S. A. Rajkumar				
1991	Aasai Kiliye Kobama	"Uyir Ezhuthum Oru Kavithai"	S. A. Rajkumar				
1991	Irumbu Pookkal	"Rettai Kuruvi"	Ilaiyaraaja				
1991	Irumbu Pookkal	"Muthana"	Ilaiyaraaja				
1991	Kaaval Nilayam	"Singakutti Neeye"	Shankar–Ganesh				
1991	Kannukoru Vannakili	"Thulli Thulli"	Ilaiyaraaja		Mano	Not Released	
1991	Karpoora Mullai	"Poonkaaviyam"	Ilaiyaraaja				
1991	MGR Nagaril	"Yenage Enthan"(Female)	S. Balakrishnan				
1991	Moondrezhuthil En Moochirukkum	"Aagayam Kondadum"(Happy)	Ilayagangai				
1991	Perum Pulli	"Aagaya Thottil"(Female)	S. A. Rajkumar				
1991	Perum Pulli	"Aanum Pennum"	S. A. Rajkumar				
1991	Sir I Love You	"Enge Iraivan"	Ilaiyaraaja		Mano		
1991	Thalattu Ketkuthamma	"Sonna Petcha"	Ilaiyaraaja	Vaali	Minmini		
1992	Chinna Gounder	"Muthumani Mala"	Ilaiyaraaja	R. V. Udayakumar	S. P. Balasubrahmanyam		
1992	Chinna Marumagal	"Mangala Melangal"	Sriraj MS				
1992	Chinna Thayee	"Arumbarumba Saram"	Ilaiyaraaja	Vaali	-		
1992	Idhuthanda Sattam	"Azhagana Poonthottam"	S. P. Venkatesh				
1992	Idhuthanda Sattam	"Kuruvi Kunju"(Version ll)	S. P. Venkatesh				
1992	Nadodi Pattukkaran	"Vanamellam"(Duet)	Ilaiyaraaja		S. P. Balasubrahmanyam		
1992	Ponnuketha Purushan	"Saaranga Thara"	Ilaiyaraaja		Malaysia Vasudevan		
1992	Suyamariyadhai	"Ragam Talam"	Sivaji Raja				
1992	Suyamariyadhai	"Vaa Maa Vaa"	Sivaji Raja				
1992	Thambi Pondatti	"Un Ennam Enge"	Ilaiyaraaja				
1993	Aranmanai Kili	"Nattu Vacha Roja"	Ilaiyaraaja	Piraisoodan	-		
1993	Gokulam	"Chevanthi Poo"	Sirpy				
1993	Kattabomman	"Koondavittu Oru"	Deva	Kalidasan	K. J. Yesudas		
1993	Naan Pesa Ninaipathellam	"Yalean Kiliyae"(Duet)	Sirpy				
1993	Naan Pesa Ninaipathellam	"Devan Kovil"	Sirpy				
1993	Pudhiya Mugam	"Kannukku"(Female)	A. R. Rahman	Vairamuthu	-		
1994	Duet	"Mettupodu Mettu"	A. R. Rahman	Vairamuthu	S. P. Balasubrahmanyam	Anandabhairavi	
1996	Indian	"Kappaleri Poyachu"	A. R. Rahman	Vaali	S. P. Balasubrahmanyam		

=== 2000s ===
Year	Film	Song	Composer(s)	Writer(s)	Co-artist(s)	Note(s)	Ref.
2006	Kannama En Kadhali	''Thennamara Thoppukula''	V. Kumar		Prabhakar		
2007	Sila Nerangalil	"Pottu Vaitha"	Srikanth Deva				

=== 2010s ===
Year	Film	Song	Composer(s)	Writer(s)	Co-artist(s)	Note(s)	Ref.
2010	Semmozhiyaana Thamizh Mozhiyaam	"Semmozhiyaana Thamizh"	A. R. Rahman	M. Karunanidhi	Various		
2011	Nilavil Mazhai	''Puthiya Karam Kondu''	Surendar				
2019	Aadai	"Raksha Raksha Jaganmatha"	Pradeep Kumar		Solo		
2019	LKG	"Tamil Anthem", "Tamizh Thai Vazhthu"	Leon James	Pa. Vijay	Sid Sriram, Chinmayi, L. R. Eswari, Vani Jayaram		

=== 2020s ===
Year	Film	Song	Composer(s)	Writer(s)	Co-artist(s)	Note(s)	Ref.
2021	Natpadu Thenral	"Vanna Vanna Komalame"	N. R. Raghunanthan	Vairamuthu	K. S. Chitra, Harini		

== Non-film songs ==
Year	Film	Song	Composer(s)	Writer(s)	Co-artist(s)
N/A	Shri Rama Naamam	"Imai Moodivaiththen"	N/A	N/A	solo
N/A	Shri Rama Naamam	"En Paadal Idhuvayya"	N/A	N/A	solo
N/A	Shri Rama Naamam	"Rama Namam Sonnale"	N/A	N/A	solo
N/A	Shri Rama Naamam	"Manilam Potridum"	N/A	N/A	solo
N/A	Shri Rama Naamam	"Shri Rama Navami"	N/A	N/A	solo
N/A	Shri Rama Naamam	"Vazhi Mel Vizhivaiththu"	N/A	N/A	solo
N/A	Shri Rama Naamam	"Neelavanai Parkkayil"	N/A	N/A	solo
N/A	Shri Rama Naamam	"Shri Ramachandran"	N/A	N/A	solo
N/A	Shri Rama Naamam	"Pullinam Padudhu"	N/A	N/A	solo
N/A	Shri Rama Naamam	"Punniyam Seidhavargal"	N/A	N/A	solo
