= Andha Naal =

1954 film by S. Balachander

- Theatrical release poster
- Directed by: S. Balachander
- Screenplay by: Javar Seetharaman
- Story by: S. Balachander
- Produced by: A. V. Meiyappan
- Starring: Sivaji Ganesan; Pandari Bai; Javar Seetharaman
- Cinematography: S. Maruti Rao
- Edited by: S. Surya
- Music by: Saraswathy Stores Orchestra
- Production company: AVM Productions
- Release date: 13 April 1954
- Running time: 130 minutes
- Country: India
- Language: Tamil

Andha Naal (pronounced [an̪da naːɭ] transl. That Day) is a 1954 Indian Tamil-language mystery and thriller film, produced by A. V. Meiyappan and directed by S. Balachander. It is the first film noir in Tamil cinema, and the first Tamil film to be made without songs, dance, or stunt sequences. Set in the milieu of World War II, the story is about the killing of a radio engineer Rajan (Sivaji Ganesan). The suspects are Rajan's wife Usha (Pandari Bai), the neighbour Chinnaiya Pillai (P. D. Sambandam), Rajan's brother Pattabi (T. K. Balachandran), Rajan's sister-in-law Hema (Menaka), and Rajan's mistress Ambujam (K. Sooryakala). Each one's account of the incident points to a new suspect.

Balachander watched Akira Kurosawa's Rashomon (1950) at a film festival, was inspired by it and wrote a play in the same narrative style, but the script was rejected by All India Radio; Meiyappan later agreed to produce it as the film that would later be titled Andha Naal under AVM Productions. The screenplay was written by Javar Seetharaman, who also played a prominent role as an investigative officer in the film. The cinematography was handled by S. Maruti Rao, and the background score was composed by AVM's own music troupe, Saraswathy Stores Orchestra. The film was shorter than most contemporaneous Tamil films. It was the only film directed by Balachander for AVM.

Andha Naal was released on 13 April 1954, on the eve of Puthandu (Tamil New Year). It was well received by critics and was awarded a Certificate of Merit for Second Best Feature Film in Tamil at the 2nd National Film Awards in 1955. Despite being a commercial failure at the time of its original release, it has acquired cult status over the years and is regarded as an important film in Tamil cinema. In 2013, Andha Naal was included in News18's list of the "100 Greatest Indian Films of All Time".

== Plot ==
On 11 October 1943, during World War II, Japanese forces bomb Madras (now Chennai). The next morning, Rajan, a radio engineer and communications researcher, is found shot dead by his own handgun in his house in Madras after his neighbour, Chinnaiya Pillai, having heard the gunshot, informs the police. Purushothaman Naidu, a local police inspector, arrives at Rajan's house and starts investigating the death.

Criminal Investigation Department (C.I.D.) Officer Sivanandam joins Naidu to help with the investigation. Naidu suggests that the killer could be a thief who killed Rajan for the money found at the crime scene. However, Sivanandam is unconvinced by Naidu's theory because the amount of money at the scene matches the withdrawal entry in the bank passbook found in the same room. Rajan was about to leave Madras in anticipation of the bombings.

The two policemen question five people in and around Rajan's house, most of whom are his family members or friends. The first to be questioned is Rajan's wife Usha, who is unable to speak because of her grief. Sivanandam and Naidu feel embarrassed and are reluctant to question her further. They begin interrogating Chinnaiya, who proposes that the killer is probably Pattabi, Rajan's younger brother, and recalls a confrontation between them: Pattabi asked for his share of the family property but Rajan refused his request, feeling that he and his wife would squander it. Chinnaiya concludes that this may have prompted Pattabi to kill Rajan.

When Sivanandam and Naidu interrogate Pattabi, who feels remorse for Rajan's death, he admits that he did not treat his brother well nor understand his good intentions. He recounts an incident in which his wife Hema fought with Rajan because he refused to apportion the property. Pattabi says Hema could have killed Rajan for the money as she loses her sanity when overpowered by anger.

Sivanandam leaves Naidu to interrogate Hema. She is initially impudent and refuses to give a statement about the crime, but she later agrees when Sivanandam threatens to arrest her husband. She reveals Rajan's extramarital affair with Ambujam, a dancer who is pregnant with his child. As Rajan treated the news of the pregnancy with a reckless attitude, Hema suggests that Ambujam could have killed him. When questioned, Ambujam accuses Chinnaiya of murdering Rajan, saying Chinnaiya was her foster father and wanted her to stay away from Rajan after the three met during a picnic. As their relationship continued, Chinnaiya became frustrated and wanted to end the affair.

Sivanandam interrogates Usha, who tells him how she and Rajan fell in love. Sivanandam tricks Usha into using a leaky fountain pen to collect her fingerprints. That evening, he and Naidu meet all the suspects at Rajan's house. Sivanandam carries out an exercise in which the suspects—including Usha—must pretend he is Rajan and shoot him using revolvers loaded with fake bullets. Chinnaiya, Pattabi and Hema shoot him as instructed, but Usha fails to do so and bursts into tears. Sivanandam then demands to have Pattabi and Hema arrested, until Usha reveals the truth.

Rajan was a radio engineer who wanted to sell radios to the poor at an affordable price. Unable to get any support from the government, he went to Japan where his work was appreciated. He then became a spy selling India's military secrets to Japan. Usha learnt about this and tried unsuccessfully to reform him. She could not stop him and attempted to shoot him. She changed her mind but pulled the trigger accidentally, killing him, and then cried at his boots later, holding them.

Sivanandam and Naidu ask Usha for the papers Rajan used to hatch the bombing plan. After she goes to Rajan's room to fetch them, Sivanandam tells Naidu that Usha's fingerprints which he collected and the ones on Rajan's boots matched, which led him to suspect her, and her failure to shoot during the exercise confirmed his suspicion. When Usha takes a long time to come back, the two hear a moment's silence followed by a gunshot, run into Rajan's room and Sivanandam screams, "Usha!".

== Cast ==
- Sivaji Ganesan as Rajan
- Pandari Bai as Usha
- Javar Seetharaman as C.I.D. Officer Sivanandam
- P. D. Sambandam as Chinnaiya Pillai
- T. K. Balachandran as Pattabi
- K. Sooryakala as Ambujam
- Menaka as Hema

== Production ==
Director S. Balachander watched Akira Kurosawa's Rashomon (1950) at a film festival, was inspired by it, and wrote a play in the same narrative style, but the script was rejected by All India Radio. He later approached A. V. Meiyappan, the founder of AVM Productions, and narrated the story for him. Although Meiyappan agreed to produce it as the film that would later be titled Andha Naal, he was unconvinced with Balachander's idea of making it without songs or stunts; however, he agreed to finance the project because he liked the story and trusted Balachander's talent. Andha Naal thus became the first Tamil film that did not have any songs or dance sequences, (Note: Although Naujawan (1937) is widely considered Indian cinema's first sound film without songs, the Limca Book of Records and Meiyappan's son M. Saravanan claim Andha Naal to be the first songless film in India. According to Indian cinema: A Visual Voyage (a book by National Film Development Corporation of India) and film historian Randor Guy, Andha Naal was the first of its kind in the whole of South Indian cinema.) and was the only film directed by Balachander for AVM Productions.

The role of the radio engineer Rajan was initially given to S. V. Sahasranamam, who was dismissed after a few days of shooting because Balachander and Meiyappan were not satisfied with his performance and felt he looked "too old" to play the role. The makers then engaged newcomer N. Viswanathan, a Tamilian professor from Calcutta (now Kolkata). When the production was halfway through, Meiyappan was dissatisfied with his performance and wanted to reshoot the film with Sivaji Ganesan. When Balachander refused Meiyappan ordered the production controller Vasu Menon to settle Balachander's salary dues and to bring the reels to be burnt before him. Balachander was shocked on hearing this and obliged to Meiyappan's wish.

Since Meiyappan had introduced Ganesan in Parasakthi (1952), he was very keen to have him play the lead role. Initially, Balachander was hesitant to approach Ganesan because he was unsure whether he would agree to play a negative role. In his autobiography, Ganesan said the film was almost completed before he was approached. He agreed to be part of the film because he found the story interesting and thought that portraying a variety of characters would interest the audience. In 2009, film historian Film News Anandan suggested that the success of Thirumbi Paar (1953), which featured Ganesan as an antihero, encouraged him to play a similar role in Andha Naal. According to film historian Randor Guy, Rajan was one of the earliest antihero roles in Tamil cinema.

Ganesan initially demanded a sum of ₹40,000 (equivalent to ₹4.4 million or US$47,000 in 2026) (Note: The exchange rate between 1948 and 1966 was 4.79 Indian rupees (₹) per 1 US dollar (US$).) for the film, which Meiyappan could not afford to pay. He offered to pay him ₹25,000 (equivalent to ₹2.8 million or US$29,000 in 2026), which Ganesan declined. Balachander, however, convinced Ganesan that Meiyappan would pay him ₹1,000 (equivalent to ₹110,000 or US$1,200 in 2026) for every day they shot the film. A reluctant Ganesan agreed to this, believing the project would take a long time to complete. But to his dismay, Balachander completed the shoot in 17 days. The screenplay was written by Javar Seetharaman, who also appeared in the film as a C.I.D. officer, and provided the voiceover in the opening sequence before Rajan is shot. It was Seetharaman's first collaboration with AVM Productions as an actor and screenwriter. Pandari Bai was selected to play Rajan's wife, while P. D. Sambandam, T. K. Balachandran, Menaka and K. Sooryakala formed the rest of the main cast.

V. Srinivasan—who later became popularly known as Muktha Srinivasan—assisted Balachander with the film. Cinematography was handled by S. Maruti Rao, and editing was done by S. Surya. The background score was recorded by Saraswathy Stores Orchestra, AVM Productions' music troupe. Two Hindi songs are used in the film in instrumental form: "Yeh Zindagi Usi Ki Hai" from Anarkali (1953) and "Chup Chup Khade Ho" from Bari Behen (1949). No credit for the story is given in the introductory credits. Andha Naal's photography was markedly different from most early Tamil films. Rao used the "painting with light" technique, which captures the actors' shadows to convey their "mood and character". Its final cut was shorter than most contemporaneous Tamil films. (Note: The average length of a Tamil film at the time was at least 15,000 feet (4,600 m). While Randor Guy states that Andha Naal's length was less than 12,500 feet (3,800 m), the Film Preservation and Restoration Workshop India 2016 gives its exact length as 13,165 feet (4,013 m).)

== Themes and influences ==
Regarded as the first film noir in Tamil cinema, Andha Naal is set in World War II, during the bombing of the Indian city of Madras by Japanese forces in 1943. The story of the blind men and an elephant is referenced in the narrative, when Sivanandam notes how each suspect's account of Rajan's death contradicts those of the others.

Though various sources, including Ganesan, have said the film was inspired by Rashomon, Randor Guy notes that this notion is erroneous, that Andha Naal was actually adapted from the 1950 British film The Woman in Question directed by Anthony Asquith, and that there was only a "thematic resemblance" between Andha Naal and Rashomon. Film journalist Jason P. Vest describes the three films as following a nonlinear narrative by presenting diverging accounts of the same incident. Film historian Swarnavel Eswaran Pillai notes that Andha Naal is unrelated to Rashomon except for its whodunit plot, where the killing is explored using various angles, and also notes that, unlike Rashomon, Andha Naal ends with the mystery being solved. In the opinion of B. Vijayakumar of The Hindu, Andha Naal is the first film noir made in South India.

According to Ganesan, the main theme of Andha Naal is patriotism; for him the film suggests that if a country does not appreciate its talented young men's efforts, they could turn against the nation. Regarding the more personal undertones, Ganesan said that the film tells how unemployment and desolation can lead young people to become traitors. Rajan becomes a traitor by selling Indian secrets to Japan because his idea was rejected by the Indian government. According to Guy, Andha Naal reuses the thematic line of the 1946 Tamil film Chitra: "a person sending secret messages to the enemy through radio". Swarnavel Eswaran Pillai compared Pandari Bai's "ideologically driven" character Usha in the film to her character in Parasakthi, but in the former, "it is the idea of the Indian nation that she pledges her allegiance to." The Times of India compared Andha Naal to Citizen Kane (1941) for its similar lighting and camera angles.

The film uses a Tamil saying "Kolaiyum Seival patthini" (a wife may even kill her own husband) as a clue to the identity of the culprit. Usha is depicted as a virtuous wife and a patriot who loves her country. When she discovers that her husband has betrayed India, she decides to kill him. The jury of the 2nd National Film Awards described Naidu as a "conscientious" officer, and Sivanandam as a "brilliant, eccentric but not so serious" man.

== Release and reception ==
"Andha Naal is for the higher classes of audience and they loved it. But it failed to elicit the interest of the average masses who just go to see a film with all the usual trappings. Yet it was a film that exceeded expectations in all respects."

— Producer A. V. Meiyappan, on the film's reception

Andha Naal received a "U" (universal) certificate by the Central Board of Film Certification after 14 cuts. It was released on 13 April 1954 on the eve of Puthandu (Tamil New Year). The film was well received by critics upon release, but failed commercially as the audiences were disappointed over the absence of songs. In theatres, they were disappointed after the first scene when Ganesan's character is shot dead, and many even walked out. Theatre owners had to persuade them to watch the entire film. After its commercial failure, Meiyappan never again made a film without song sequences. The film was later re-released after winning the Certificate of Merit for the Second Best Feature Film in Tamil at the 2nd National Film Awards (1955), (Note: The film won the award jointly with Edhir Paradhathu.) and became a box-office success. Moser Baer and AP International have released the film on home video.

In addition to its National Film Award win, the film won a Best Film Award from the Madras Filmfans' Association in 1955. Contemporary critics lauded Meiyappan and Balachander for the experimental film. While Ganesan's role as an antihero won him critical acclaim, many critics felt that Pandari Bai's role as the patriotic wife overshadowed his performance. Many contemporary critics expected the film to be a trendsetter, but it failed to inspire many thematically similar films in Tamil. Several years later, Balachander's wife Shanta recalled that he was not affected by the film's failure as he was "delighted that he pulled it off", with critics praising the performances of Ganesan, Pandari Bai and the other actors.

A contemporary review from the Tamil monthly magazine Kalaimanram praised AVM for novelty and called Andha Naal a daring venture. The Tamil weekly Kumudam (dated 1 May 1954) praised Meiyappan for recognising "young talents" like Balachander and Seetharaman. However, the reviewer criticised AVM for not publicising the film as a thriller; he asserted that had the film been publicised in such manner, the fans would not have been horrified by the absence of songs in the film. The reviewer's verdict was "Success of art; failure of narrative". The same month, a meeting was organised by the Film Fans Association in Madras to congratulate Meiyappan, Balachander, the actors and the other crew members. V. C. Gopalaratnam, the president of the association, praised Meiyappan for his "pioneering spirit" in producing a film without songs or dances. The Tamil magazine Gundoosi said that, for fans who were wondering whether there would be a day when a shorter film without songs and dance would be produced that had a narrative beyond the traditional love story, "That Day has come. Such a cinema of renaissance is Andha Naal". The writer also appreciated Maruti Rao's cinematography and Meiyappan's courageous effort, and asked fans to support such a film if they "really want Tamil cinema to progress". The Indian Express praised the script by Seetharaman, the performances of Ganesan, Pandari Bai and Sambandam, the absence of songs and dance sequences, and concluded that the film was "remarkable for some fine and original ideas in photography".

== Legacy ==
The film has been described by French film historian Yves Thoraval as a revolution in Tamil cinema for the absence of songs and dances. Though largely ignored at the time of its original release, it has since attained cult status in Tamil cinema. In addition to becoming a trendsetter for Tamil films without songs, it set a benchmark in Tamil cinema for noir-style lighting with some of its dramatic sequences. In 2001, journalist S. Muthiah called Andha Naal the "best film" produced by Meiyappan. He noted that it "proved that a song-and-danceless film could also be a hit." In July 2007 when S. R. Ashok Kumar of The Hindu asked eight Tamil film directors for a list of their all-time favourite Tamil films, three of them—K. Balachander, Mani Ratnam and Ameer—named Andha Naal. Malaysian author Devika Bai, writing for the New Straits Times, described Andha Naal as Balachander's magnum opus, and Balachander as "Tamil cinema's Father of Film Noir".

The film is regarded by many critics as Balachander's best. Encouraged by its critical success, Balachander went on to direct and act in several more films of the same genre: Avana Ivan (1962), Bommai (1964) and Nadu Iravil (1970). Andha Naal inspired several later whodunit films: including Puthiya Paravai (1964), Kalangarai Vilakkam (1965), Sigappu Rojakkal (1978), Moodu Pani (1980) and Pulan Visaranai (1990), and several songless Tamil films such as Unnaipol Oruvan (1965), Kudisai (1979), Veedu (1988) and Uchi Veyil (1990). Researcher and ethnographer Preeti Mudliar compared Ratha Kanneer (1954) to Andha Naal because in both films "the sin of foreignness is [neutralised] by a chaste Tamil woman, the virtuous wife". Director Chimbu Deven acknowledged Andha Naal as an influence on his 2014 film Oru Kanniyum Moonu Kalavaanikalum.

Andha Naal was screened in the "Tamil Retrospective Section" of the 14th International Film Festival of India in 1991. In 2008, Randor Guy praised it for "being the first Tamil film which had no dance, song or stunt sequence and for [Balachander]'s impressive direction and fine performances by Sivaji Ganesan and Pandari Bai". In March 2012, film historian Mohan Raman told The Times of India that, being the first film noir in Tamil cinema, it was "among the significant black and white films of yore", along with Mayabazar (1957) and Uthama Puthiran (1940). In a 2013 interview with the Tamil magazine Ananda Vikatan, Malayalam filmmaker Adoor Gopalakrishnan listed Andha Naal as one of his earliest favourites in Tamil cinema. In April 2013, Andha Naal was included in News18's list of "100 greatest Indian films of all time". In mid-April 2014, it was screened at the Russian Cultural Centre, Chennai, to mark its diamond jubilee anniversary.

In March 2015, the Film Heritage Foundation announced that it would be restoring Andha Naal along with a few other Indian films from 1931 to 1965 as a part of its restoration projects being carried out in India and abroad. The Foundation said it would not colourise any of the films as they should be "the way the master or the creator had seen it." Filmmaker Shivendra Singh Dungarpur also believes that the film requires restoration on a "priority basis". A 30-minute play adaptation of the film was staged in April 2016, directed by Balachander's son Raman. Another play adaptation, also directed by him, was staged the following year, on 13 April.

== See also ==
- Rashomon effect

== Bibliography ==
- Baskaran, S. Theodore (2013) [1996]. The Eye of the Serpent: An introduction to Tamil cinema (2nd ed.). Westland. ISBN 978-93-83260-74-4.
- Fraser, R.; Hammond, M. (2008). Books Without Borders, Volume 2: Perspectives from South Asia. Palgrave Macmillan UK. ISBN 978-0-230-28913-0.
- Ganesan, Sivaji; Narayana Swamy, T. S. (2007) [2002]. Autobiography of an Actor: Sivaji Ganesan, October 1928 – July 2001. Sivaji Prabhu Charities Trust. OCLC 297212002.
- Guy, Randor (1997). Starlight, Starbright: The Early Tamil Cinema. Chennai: Amra Publishers. OCLC 52794531.
- Limca Book of Records. Bisleri Beverages Limited. 2006.
- Muthiah, S. (1989). Tales of Old and New Madras: The Dalliance of Miss Mansell and 34 Other Stories of 350 Years. Affiliated East-West Press. ISBN 81-85336-25-3.
- National Film Development Corporation of India (1998). Indian cinema: A Visual Voyage. Ministry of Information and Broadcasting. ISBN 978-81-230-0646-8.
- Pillai, Swarnavel Eswaran (2015). Madras Studios: Narrative, Genre, and Ideology in Tamil Cinema. SAGE Publications. ISBN 978-93-5150-212-8.
- Reddy, K. Krishna (2005). General Studies History 4 Upsc. Tata McGraw-Hill Education. ISBN 0-07-060447-9.
- Sampath, Vikram (2012). Voice of the Veena, S. Balachander: A Biography. Rupa Publications. ISBN 978-81-291-2969-7.
- Saravanan, M. (2013) [2005]. AVM 60 Cinema (in Tamil) (3rd ed.). Rajarajan Pathippagam. OCLC 1158347612.
- Tara (24 April 1954). "திரை அரங்கம்: அந்த நாள் (விமர்சனம்)". Kalaimanram (in Tamil).
- Vest, Jason P. (2014). Spike Lee: Finding the Story and Forcing the Issue. ABC-CLIO. ISBN 978-0-313-39226-9.
- Thoraval, Yves (2000). The Cinemas of India. Macmillan India. ISBN 978-0-333-93410-4.
