= Jodhi =

Jodhi is a given name. Notable people with the name include:

- Jodhi Bibi (1573–1619), popularly known as Jagat Gosain, Mughal Empress
- Jodhi Meares (born 1971), Australian fashion designer and former model
- Jodhi May (born 1975), English actress

== See also ==
- Anandha Jodhi, a 1963 Tamil language film
