= Rukmani Kalyanam =

1936 film directed by Bhalji Pendharkar

- Poster
- Directed by: Balachandra Pendharkar; Baburao Khandekar
- Produced by: Bhalji Pendharkar
- Starring: S. Rajam; M. S. Vijayal
- Production company: Venkateshwara Films
- Release date: 1936
- Country: India
- Language: Tamil

Rukmani Kalyanam (transl. Rukmani's marriage) is a 1936 Indian Tamil-language Hindu mythological film produced and directed by Bhalji Pendharkar. It stars S. Rajam as the Hindu god Krishna and M. S. Vijayal as his chief consort Rukmani.

== Cast ==
Male cast

- Master S. Rajam as Shri Krishna
- R. Duraisamy Raju as Balaraman
- T. R. Mani B. A. as Rukmi
- S. Bala Subramaniam B. A. as Shishupalan
- M. N. M. Sundaram as Naradar
- Joker Ramudu as Subodar
- P. K. Balu as Boatman
- R. D. Raju as Boatman

Female cast

- M. S. Vijayal as Rukmani
- T. S. Meenambal as Chitralekha
- Chellam as Revathi
- Gowri as Friend

Supported by

Mathirimangalam Natesa Iyer, Sreemathi, Panchu Bhagavathar and Kamala.

== Production ==
Rukmani Kalyanam was produced and directed by Bhalji Pendharkar. S. Rajam, who portrayed the Hindu god Krishna in Sita Kalyanam (1934) and Radha Kalyanam (1935), played the same role in this film, while M. S. Vijayal played his wife Rukmani. Other supporting roles were played by Mathirimangalam Natesa Iyer, Sreemathi, Panchu Bhagavathar and Kamala. The final length of the film was 15,638 feet.

== Reception ==
Rukmani Kalyanam was not successful at the box office, but film historian Randor Guy, writing for The Hindu, said that it would be remembered for "the appearance of Rajam as Lord Krishna, and the interesting on-screen narration of the epic story by director Balji Phendarkar".
