= Araichimani =

1942 film by P. K. Raja Sandow

Araichimani or Manuneethi Chozhan
- Film poster
- ஆராய்ச்சிமணி ஆராய்ச்சிமணி அல்லது மனுநீதி சோழன்
- Directed by: P. K. Raja Sandow; Ragubeer S. Ramye
- Story by: Kavi Kunjaram
- Based on: Life Story of Manu Needhi Cholan
- Starring: P. B. Rangachariar; M. R. Santhanalakshmi
- Cinematography: E. R. Cooper
- Edited by: S. Panju
- Music by: Srinivasa Rao Shinde
- Production companies: Kandhan Studio, Coimbatore
- Release date: 1942
- Country: India
- Language: Tamil

Araichimani or Manuneethi Chozhan is a 1942 Indian Tamil language film directed by P. K. Raja Sandow. The film stars P. B. Rangachari, M. R. Santhanalakshmi, S. Balachander, S. Varalakshmi, A.R. Sakunthala, N. S. Krishnan and T. A. Mathuram.

== Premise ==
Manuneethi Chozhan was a popular and just king. When a calf is killed by his only son, the mother cow asks for justice. The king orders that his son be killed in the same manner as the calf. The gods come and restore both his son's and the calf's life. This story is downplayed in the film. The film details the aftermath of this popular story.

The prince falls in love with the daughter of a minister in the king's court, but the minister opposes their marriage. Aaraichimani is the story how the two are eventually married.

== Cast ==
Cast according to the song book

Male Cast

- P. B. Rangachariar as Manuchozhan
- S. Balachandran as Vitangan
- Master Radha as Young Vitagan
- C. P. Viswanathan as Prime Minister
- B. P. Ramalingam as Second Minister
- T. S. Ponnusami Pillai as Rajaguru
- M. R. Swaminathan as Male Scholar
- T. R. Lakshminarayanan as Manoharan
- S. Kosalaram as Katamban
- R. G. Natarajasundaram as Sadhu
- N. S. Krishnan as Sadayan

Female Cast

- M. R. Santhanalakshmi as Thiribuvanai
- S. Varalakshmi as Kalavalli
- A. R. Sakunthala as Lalitha
- P. S. Chandra as Neela
- M. S. Dhanalakshmi as Kanchana
- R. A. Lakshmirani as Mallika
- T. A. Mathuram as Maruthayi

Dance

- Kalamandala Madhavan, Thangamani, Chitralekha, Dance Group

== Production ==
The film was produced by Kandhan Studio, owned by Kandhan and Company in Coimbatore. This film was one of their famed productions. The studio and the company no longer exists now. The laboratory was handled by R. Krishnan. Art direction was by B. D. Kotval and T. R. Ganesan. The settings were by P. B. Krishnan and M. V. Gochap. Finally, the makeup was handled by T. S. Gopal Rao.

== Soundtrack ==
Music was directed by Srinivasa Rao Shinde, in the meantime, the lyrics were written by Kambadasan. The songs were recorded by M. D. Rajaram. Singers include S. Balachander, S. Varalakshmi, N. S. Krishnan, T. A. Mathuram, P. B. Rangachariar, R. G. Natarajasundaram, T. S. Ponnusami Pillai, Master Radha, S. Kosalaram and A. R. Sakunthala.

No	Song	Singer
1		Chorus
2		P. B. Rangachariar
3		R. G. Natarajasundaram
4		M. R. Santhanalakshmi
5		P. B. Rangachariar
6		P. B. Rangachariar, M. R. Santhanalakshmi
7		Master Radha
8		M. R. Santhanalakshmi
9		Chorus
10		S. Balachandran
11		T. S. Ponnusami Pillai
12		P. B. Rangachariar
13		S. Varalakshmi, A. R. Sakunthala
14		S. Varalakshmi
15		S. Balachandran
16		S. Varalakshmi
17		S. Varalakshmi, S. Balachandran
18		S. Kosalaram, A. R. Sakunthala
19		R. G. Natarajasundaram
20		R. G. Natarajasundaram
21		T. A. Mathuram
22		N. S. Krishnan
