= Javar Seetharaman =

Indian actor and writer (1919–1971)

- Born: N. Seetharaman; 7 January 1919; Tiruchirappalli, Madras Presidency, British India
- Died: 30 November 1971 (aged 52); Chennai
- Occupations: Screenwriter, director, actor
- Years active: 1947–1970
- Relatives: Ra. Sankaran (cousin)

Javar Seetharaman (1919–1971) was an Indian author, screenwriter and actor, who predominately worked in Tamil-language films.

== Biography ==
N. Seetharaman was a lawyer from Trichy. He joined Gemini Studios to pursue a career in films. Besides acting, he also wrote the script and dialogues for some Tamil and Hindi films. He came to be called "Jawar" or "Javert" due to his portrayal of Javert in the 1950 Tamil film, Ezhai Padum Padu, based on Les Misérables by Victor Hugo.

== Bibliography ==
=== Tamil fiction ===
- Minnal Mazhai Mohini
- Panam Pen pasam
- Udal Porul Ananthi
- Nane Naan
- Sorkgaththil Puyal
- Kase Kadavul

== Partial filmography ==
=== Actor ===
Year	Film	Role	Notes
1947	Miss Malini		
1948	Chandralekha	Veerasimman's bodyguard	
1948	En Kanavar	Sarojavar	
1950	Ezhai Padum Padu	Inspector Javert	
1951	Marmayogi		
1953	Panakkari		
1954	Manohara	Sathyaseelan	
1954	Andha Naal	C.I.D. officer Sivanandam	Also screenplay and dialogues
1954	Viduthalai		
1955	Chella Pillai		Also screenplay
1957	Manamagan Thevai	College Principal	
1958	Kanniyin Sabatham		
1959	Veerapandiya Kattabomman	Major Bannerman	
1959	Engal Kuladevi		
1960	Irumbu Thirai	Lawyer	
1960	Kuzhandhaigal Kanda Kudiyarasu	King	
1960	Kaithi Kannayiram	Police Officer	
1960	Kalathur Kannamma	Jameendar Singaram	
1960	Kadavulin Kuzhandhai	Muthaiya Pillai	
1960	Parthiban Kanavu	Sivachariyar	
1960	Aalukkoru Veedu		
1961	Kumara Raja		
1961	Kaanal Neer		
1962	Valar Pirai	Varatharajan	
1963	Anandha Jothi	C.I.D Sundaram	
1963	Ratha Thilagam		
1963	Vaanampadi	Dr Sivasankar	
1964	Andavan Kattalai	College Principal	
1964	Karnan	Bhishmar	
1967	Pattanathil Bhootham	Bootham	
1968	En Thambi	Karunakara Boopathy	
1969	Thanga Surangam	Arockiyasamy	
1969	Sivandha Mann	King	

=== Writer ===
Year	Film	Status	Notes
1954	Andha Naal	Screenplay	
1956	Bhai-Bhai	Screenplay	Hindi film
1959	Athisaya Penn	Yes	
1960	Kalathur Kannamma	Yes	
1962	Valarpirai	Screenplay	
1962	Shaadi	Story	Hindi film
1962	Aadi Perukku	Yes	
1962	Aalayamani	Screenplay	
1963	Anandha Jodhi	Yes	
1964	Andavan Kattalai	Screenplay	
1965	Kuzhandaiyum Deivamum	Screenplay	
1965	Antastulu	Story	Telugu film
1966	Ramu	Screenplay	
1967	Pattathu Rani	Yes	
1967	Pattanathil Bhootham	Screenplay	
1968	Do Kaliyaan	Story, screenplay	Hindi film
1968	Uyarndha Manithan	Screenplay	
1980	Panam Penn Paasam	Yes	

Director

- Paisa Ya Pyaar (1969; Hindi) – direction and production

== Awards and nominations ==
Nandi Awards

- 1965 – Nandi Award for Second Best Story Writer – Antastulu

Nominated

- 1963 – Filmfare Award for Best Story – Main Chup Rahungi
