= En Kanavar =

1948 film by S. Balachander

- Poster
- Directed by: S. Balachander
- Written by: Javar Seetharaman (dialogues)
- Story by: Chaturbhuj Doshi
- Starring: S. Balachander; Nandini; V. Chellam
- Cinematography: S. S. Varma
- Music by: S. Balachander
- Production company: Ajit Pictures
- Release date: 18 February 1948
- Country: India
- Language: Tamil

En Kanavar (transl. My Husband) is a 1948 Indian Tamil language film directed by S. Balachander and produced by Ajith Pictures. Balachandar, in addition to directing, also composed the music, sang many of the numbers and starred as the male lead.

== Cast ==
- S. Balachander as a wealthy man
- S. Nandini as the wealthy man's cousin
- V. Chellam as the dancer

== Production ==
Although a Tamil film, En Kanavar was produced by the Bombay-based Ajit Pictures. Its story was written by Chaturbhuj Doshi, and the dialogue by Javar Seetharaman. Shooting took place at Ranjit Studios. In addition to directing and starring, Balachandar sang many of the film's songs which included solo and duets; he composed all of them in Carnatic ragas. The film criticises Western social tendencies and how they disrupt Indian society and traditions.

== Release and reception ==
En Kanavar was released on 18 February 1948.
