= Edi Nijam =

- Poster
- Directed by: S. Balachander
- Written by: Sunkara Satyanarayana
- Produced by: Ghantasala Krishnamurthy
- Starring: Nagabhushanam; Showkar Janaki; Gummadi; Ramana Reddy; Vangara
- Music by: Master Venu
- Release date: 1956
- Country: India
- Language: Telugu

Edi Nijam (transl. What is Truth?) is a 1956 Indian Telugu-language film directed by Vainik and film personality S. Balachander and produced by Ghantasala Krishnamurthy of Pratibha Films. The films starring Nagabhushanam of Rakta Kanneeru fame. The story is loosely based on the Italian film Puzitor. The film was dubbed into Tamil as Edhu Nijam (1956).

== The plot ==
Kotayya (Nagabhushanam) is a labourer in a small village. He marries Raami (Janaki) and is living happily. The village Munasabu (Gummadi) is a cutthroat and cheat. He is closely assisted by Naatu Vaidyudu (Ramana Reddy) and Poojari (Vangara). Tirupati (Joga Rao), friend of Kotayya, is a very angry man and used to criticize Munasabu openly. Munasabu tries to get Rami into his control by different ways. Tirupati opposes him. Munasabu cunningly kills him in a forest and blames the crime on Kotayya. This results in Kotayya going to jail. Returning from jail, Kotayya knows the truth and attacks Munasabu. Police arrest him while he is hiding in the forest.

== Cast ==
| Actor / Actress | Character |
|---|---|
| Nagabhushanam | Kotayya |
| Showkar Janaki | Raami |
| Gummadi | Munusabu |
| Ramana Reddy | Naatu Vaidyudu |
| Vangara Venkata Subbaiah | Poojari |
| Joga Rao | Tirupati |
| Sitaram | |
| Hemalatha | |
| Jaggayya | Lawyer |
| Peketi Sivaram | Guest role |

== Production ==
When Ghantasala and Balachander were searching for a suitable lead actor without any image who could portray the character, Sastri, the production chief, recommended Nagabhushanam for the role, which eventually became his first leading role.

== Soundtrack ==
All music is composed by Master Venu.

Track listing
| No. | Title | Singer(s) | Length |
|---|---|---|---|
| 1. | "Beedala Rodana Vinava Nirupedala Vedana Kanava" | Jikki Krishnaveni |
| 2. | "Edi Nijam Manavudaa Edi Nijam" | Ghantasala, Madhavapeddi Satyam |
| 3. | "Guttonkai Kooroyi Baava" | Jikki Krishnaveni |
| 4. | "Nedu Naamanasu Uyyalaloogene" | Jikki Krishnaveni |

== Awards ==
- National Film Awards
  - 1956 - National Film Award for Best Feature Film in Telugu - Certificate of Merit
