= Sita Kalyanam (1934 Tamil film) =

1934 Tamil film

Seetha Kalyanam
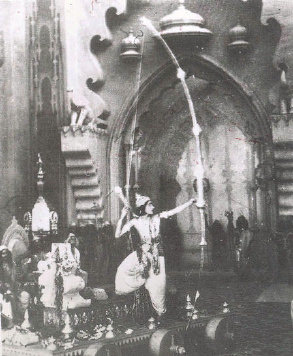
- S. Rajam as Rama wielding Shiva's bow in Seetha Kalyanam
- Directed by: Baburao Pendharkar; K. Ramnoth
- Produced by: Prabhat Film Company
- Starring: S. Rajam; S. Jayalakshmi; V. Sundaram Iyer; S. Balachander
- Cinematography: K. Ramnoth
- Music by: Papanasam Sivan; A.N. Kalayanasundaram
- Release date: 1934
- Language: Tamil

Seetha Kalyanam (transl. Seetha's Wedding) is a 1934 Indian Tamil-language Hindu mythological film directed by Baburao Pendharkar and K. Ramnoth and produced by Prabhat Film Company. The film stars S. Rajam and S. Jayalakshmi in the lead roles and marks the cinematic debut of notable musicians Papanasam Sivan and S. Balachander.

The film is significant for being the first Tamil production to feature colour, achieved using hand-colouring techniques. It was remade in Telugu the same year under the same title.

== Plot ==
Sita Kalyanam is the story of Sita's swayamvara. Sita's father King Janaka arranges a swayamvara, a formal ceremony of selecting a groom, for his daughter. He announces a contest and declares that whoever can wield Shiva Dhanush (Shiva's bow) will be given Seetha's hand in marriage. After several kings and princes fail to do so, Rama, the prince of Ayodhya, wields the bow and marries Sita.

== Cast ==
- S. Rajam – Rama
- S. Jayalakshmi – Sita
- V. Sundaram Iyer – Janaka
- T. V. Seetharama Iyer – Dasaratha
- P. Venkata Rao – Viswamitra
- G. K. Seshagiri
- Kamala – Kaikeyi
- Rajam – Kausalya
- S. Saraswathi – Urmila
- S. Balachander – Musician at Ravana's Court

== Production ==
The film was produced by Prabhat Film Company under the direction of Baburao Pendharkar, with K. Ramnoth serving as his assistant. V. Shantaram, who helmed the studio, decided to create a Tamil-language film to recoup losses from his 1933 Marathi film Sairandhri, which had been a financial failure. To minimize expenses, Shantaram planned to reuse the sets from Sairandhri at Kolhapur for this project. Seeking collaborators, he reached out to Sound and Shadow, a Madras-based film magazine, for assistance.

The magazine’s team, comprising directors Murugadasa (Muthuswamy Iyer), A. K. Sekhar, K. Ramnoth, and financier G. K. Seshagiri, agreed to support Shantaram’s endeavour. They were joined by V. Sundaram Iyer and his children—S. Jayalakshm, S. Rajam, and Veenai S. Balachander—who played key roles in the production. All of them went to Kolhapur to participate in the new film. Papanasam Sivan, the children's music tutor, was brought on board to write the lyrics for the film’s songs.

The film’s production involved several unique elements. The songs were recorded live on set, with actors singing in their own voices while the orchestra played off-camera. Portable instruments such as the harmonium, violin, flute, tabla, and clarinet were predominantly used for this purpose. The film was later remade in Telugu, featuring a different cast, with K. Ramnoth serving as the cinematographer and A. K. Sekhar as the art director.

== Reception ==
The film was very popular and became a hit. S. Rajam and S. Balachander became famous and came to be known as "Prabhat prodigy stars". The film created a controversy among conservatives for having a brother and sister duo star as husband and wife.

== See also ==
- List of early color feature films
