= Chitra (1946 film) =

1946 film by Wahab Kashmiri

- Theatrical release poster
- Directed by: Wahab Kashmiri
- Produced by: T. R. Sundaram
- Starring: K. L. V. Vasantha; T. S. Balaiah
- Production company: Modern Theatres
- Release date: 30 March 1946
- Country: India
- Language: Tamil

Chitra is a 1946 Indian Tamil-language film produced by T. R. Sundaram of Modern Theatres. Directed by Wahab Kashmiri, it features K. L. V. Vasantha, T. S. Balaiah, T. S. Durairaj, K. K. Perumal, M. E. Madhavan and V. S. Susheela. The film was released on 30 March 1946 and failed commercially.

== Plot ==
A widowed police commissioner's daughter (Vasantha) falls in love with another police officer (Balaiah). Vasantha's father realises that a man has been committing treason by secretly sending radio messages to enemies, so he hires Balaiah to discover who it is. Balaiah, aided by two incompetent helpers (Durairaj and Madhavan), sets out to find the culprit, but the culprit imprisons them in an isolated bungalow.

Unable to find Balaiah, Vasantha is devastated. She and her father make several efforts to locate Balaiah and his aids but fail. At the bungalow, one of Balaiah's aids finds a tie-pin, which is a gift from Vasantha to Balaiah. Balaiah throws it out through a keyhole. Vasantha finds it, after which her father and his men storm the bungalow, free Balaiah and later capture the culprit. Balaiah and Vasantha re-unite.

== Production ==
Chitra was launched in 1945, soon after World War II ended. Directed by Wahab Kashmiri, it was produced by T. R. Sundaram under the banner of Modern Theatres, with K. L. V. Vasantha, T. S. Balaiah, T. S. Durairaj, K. K. Perumal, M. E. Madhavan and V. S. Susheela as the lead actors. The film's final length was 10,569 feet (3,221 m).

== Release and reception ==
Although censored on 19 December 1945, Chitra was released only on 30 March 1946. The magazine Pesum Padam, then known for invoking English-language American films in the context of Sundaram's films, compared Sundaram's deft portrayal of the maid character Kannamma, "who steals the audience's hearts", with that of the minor characters in English films who often steal the show from the main actors. Swarnavel Eswaran Pillai, author of the 2015 book Madras Studios, believes the invocation of "English films" was deliberate as the reviewer's intention to paint Sundaram's sensibilities as Western was very conspicuous. According to historian Randor Guy, the film was not successful because of the "wrong casting" of Balaiah, then known for playing negative roles, in a heroic role, and audiences disliked seeing him "going about smartly dressed in suits" and holding a pipe. The song "Ahahahahaha...Aanandham", picturised on Vasantha, attained popularity. The film's theme of a man leaking secrets to enemies via radio was later used in Andha Naal (1954).

== Bibliography ==
- Pillai, Swarnavel Eswaran (2015). Madras Studios: Narrative, Genre, and Ideology in Tamil Cinema. SAGE Publications. ISBN 978-93-515-0121-3.
