= Valar Pirai =

1962 film by D. Yoganand

- Theatrical release poster
- Directed by: D. Yoganand
- Screenplay by: Javar Seetharaman
- Story by: A. S. Nagarajan
- Starring: Sivaji Ganesan; B. Saroja Devi
- Cinematography: W. R. Subba Rao
- Music by: K. V. Mahadevan
- Production company: Padma Films
- Distributed by: Sri Rama Films
- Release date: 30 March 1962
- Country: India
- Language: Tamil

Valar Pirai (transl. The Waxing Moon) is a 1962 Indian Tamil-language drama film, directed by D. Yoganand. The film stars Sivaji Ganesan and B. Saroja Devi. It was released on 30 March 1962.

== Plot ==
The plot of this film revolves around a child born to the protagonist Kanagu (Sivaji Ganesan) and Saraswathi (Saroja Devi). Because the child was born in the Rohini constellation with the umbilical cord wrapped around its neck while still in Saraswathi's womb, the film's story briefly depicts how the child's astrological influence leads to the death of Saraswathi's brother, Varatharajan (Javar Seetharaman), after much suffering. Furthermore, the film illustrates the mythological belief that death is certain for the maternal uncle of a child born in the Rohini constellation.

== Cast ==
- Sivaji Ganesan as Kanagu/Kanagasundaram
- B. Saroja Devi as Saraswathi
- T. S. Balaiah as Dharmalingam
- M. V. Rajamma as Nallamma
- M. R. Radha as Krishnapuram Pannaiyar
- V. Nagayya as Govindharajan
- Javar Seetharaman as Varatharajan
- K. A. Thangavelu as Pickpocket Mani
- Leelavathi
- M. Saroja as Sundari

== Soundtrack ==
The music was composed by K. V. Mahadevan, with lyrics by Kannadasan.

Song	Singers
"Kalakalakkudhu Kaathu"	T. M. Soundararajan, P. Susheela
"Koondu Thirandhamma"	T. M. Soundararajan
"Kannam Sevantha Machaan"	S. C. Krishnan, K. Rani
"Mounam Mounam"	P. Susheela
"Naangu Suvarkalukkul"	P. Susheela
"Pachchaikodiyil"	P. Susheela
"Pojjiyathukkule Oru"	T. M. Soundararajan

== Release and reception ==
Valar Pirai was released on 30 March 1962, and distributed by Sri Rama Films. Kanthan of Kalki criticised the film for its numerous plot holes.
