= S. Balachander =

Indian veena player and filmmaker (1927–1990)

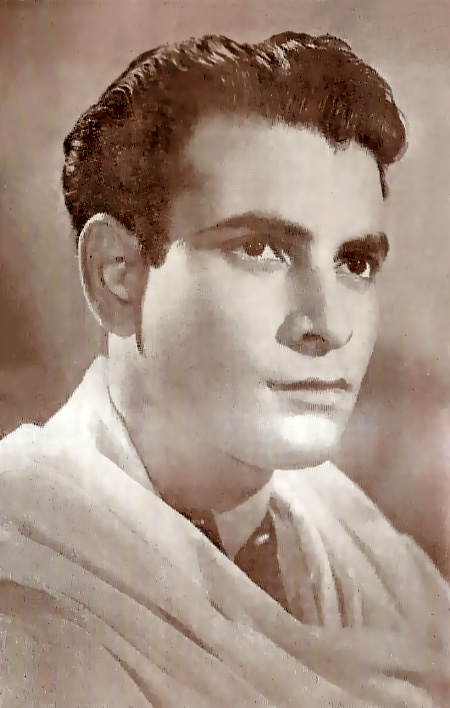
- Balachander in 1948
- Born: Sundaram Balachander; 18 January 1927; Madras, Madras Presidency, British India (now Chennai, Tamil Nadu, India)
- Died: 13 April 1990 (aged 63); Bhilai, undivided Madhya Pradesh (now in Chhattisgarh), India
- Occupations: Actor, playback singer
- Years active: 1934 to 1990
- Awards: Padma Bhushan

Sundaram Balachander (18 January 1927 – 13 April 1990) was an Indian veena player and filmmaker. He directed, produced, and also composed music for a few of his films. Balachander was awarded the Padma Bhushan in 1982. He died of a heart attack at the age of 63, while on a music tour of India.

== Film career ==
S Balachander was born to Sundaram Iyer and Parvathi alias Chellamma on 18 January 1927 in Mylapore, a neighbourhood in present-day Chennai, Tamil Nadu. Sunderam Iyer was a patron of Papanasam Sivan and many other musicians in Mylapore.

Balachander began as a child artist in the Tamil film Seetha Kalyanam in 1934, in which many members of his family acted. Balachander himself acted as a child musician in Ravana's court, and his father V. Sundaram Iyer acted as Janaka, elder brother S. Rajam as Rama and elder sister S. Jayalakshmi as Seeta. This was followed by appearances in Rishyasringar (1941) and Araichimani (1942).

In 1948 Balachander directed the film En Kanavar. In 1954 he directed Andha Naal, a classic Tamil film noir thriller.

== Swati Tirunal Dispute ==
S Balachander claimed that the composer Swathi Thirunal Rama Varma never existed and was a figment of history's imagination. He accused Semmangudi Srinivasa Iyer of passing off his own compositions as Swati Tirunal's. Balachander also disputed Balamurali Krishna's claims of having invented new ragas.

S Balachander was actively involved in the Swati Tirunal dispute at the time of his death.

== Awards ==
- 1954 – Certificate of Merit for Best Feature Film in Tamil – Andha Naal
- 1956 – Certificate of Merit for Best Feature Film in Telugu – Edi Nijam
- 1982 – Sangeetha Kalasikhamani, by The Indian Fine Arts Society, Chennai.
- 1982 – Padmabhushan

== Filmography ==
Year	Film	Language	Actor	Director	Music director	Singer	Producer	Note
1934	Seetha Kalyanam	Tamil	check	✗	✗	✗	✗	
1941	Rishyasringar	Tamil	check	✗	✗	✗	✗	
1941	Kamadhenu	Tamil	check	✗	✗	✗	✗	Credited as Master Balachandar
1942	Aaraichimani	Tamil	check	✗	✗	✗	✗	
1947	Baktha Thulasidas	Tamil	✗		check	✗	✗	Music Composer along with Anil Biswas
1948	Idhu Nijama	Tamil	✗	check	check	check		Assistant Director
1948	En Kanavar	Tamil	check	check	check	check		Editor
1951	Kaithi	Tamil	check	check	check	check		
1951	Devaki	Tamil	check	✗	✗	✗	✗	
1951	Rajambal	Tamil	check		check			Music Composer along with M. S. Gnanamani
1952	Rani	Tamil	check	✗	✗	✗	✗	
1953	Inspector	Tamil	check	✗	✗	✗	✗	
1954	Andha Naal	Tamil		check				
1954	Penn	Tamil	check					
1954	Sangham	Telugu	check					
1955	Koteeswaran	Tamil	check					
1955	Doctor Savithri	Tamil	check					
1956	Edi Nijam	Telugu		check				
1956	Edhu Nijam	Tamil		check				
1958	Bhoologa Rambai	Tamil		check				Director along with D. Yoganand upon the demise of K. Ramnoth
1958	Bhooloka Rambha	Telugu		check				Director along with D. Yoganand upon the demise of K. Ramnoth
1958	Avan Amaran	Tamil		check				
1959	Maragadham	Tamil	check					
1962	Avana Ivan	Tamil	check	check	check		check	
1964	Bommai	Tamil	check	check	check		check	
1970	Nadu Iravil	Tamil	check	check	check		check	
