= S. Rajam =

Indian musician and painter (1919–2010)

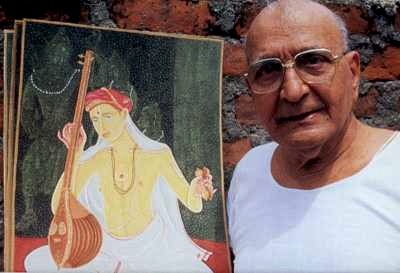

Background information
- Born: 10 February 1919
- Origin: India
- Died: 29 January 2010 (aged 90)
- Occupations: Actor, painter, musician

Sundaram Rajam (10 February 1919 – 29 January 2010) was a distinguished Indian Carnatic musician and painter from the state of Tamil Nadu.

== Film career ==
S Rajam was born to Sundaram Iyer and Parvathi alias Chellamma. Sunderam Iyer was a patron of Papanasam Sivan and many other musicians in Mylapore, Chennai.

He was a student of the Carnatic musician Papanasam Sivan and the older brother of Tamil film director and musician S. Balachander and actress S. Jayalakshmi. Rajam made his Tamil film debut in the 1934 film Seetha Kalyanam. He acted in a few more films in the lead role, before becoming a full-time musician - especially renowned for his singing - and painter. He worked as a staff artist and music supervisor at All India Radio. He is known for his series of portraits of the Trinity of Carnatic music. He is also known for popularising Koteeswara Iyer's musical compositions. He was a member of the Madras Music Academy.

== Awards ==
- Sangeet Natak Akademi Award (in 1991).
- Sangita Kala Acharya by the Music Academy, Chennai.
- Sangeetha Kalasikhamani 2008 by the Indian Fine Arts Society, Chennai

== Filmography ==
- Seetha Kalyanam (1934)
- Radha Kalyanam (1935)
- Rukmini Kalyanam (1936)
- Sivakavi (1943)
