= Autobiography of an Actor =

Book by Sivaji Ganesan

Autobiography of an Actor: Sivaji Ganesan, October 1928 – July 2001
- Cover of the English edition, 2007
- Author: Sivaji Ganesan; T. S. Narayanaswamy
- Translator: Sabita Radhakrishna
- Language: Tamil
- Publisher: Sivaji Prabhu Charities Trust
- Publication date: 1 October 2002
- Publication place: India
- English publication date: 1 October 2007
- Pages: 310
- OCLC: 536676958

Autobiography of an Actor: Sivaji Ganesan, October 1928 – July 2001 is the autobiography of Indian actor Sivaji Ganesan published by Sivaji Prabhu Charities Trust. It is told in a Q&A format between Ganesan and T. S. Narayanaswamy. The book was originally published in Tamil under the title Enathu Suya Sarithai (transl. My Autobiography) on 1 October 2002, and the English translated version by Sabita Radhakrishna was released on the same date five years later.

== Background ==
T. S. Narayanaswamy's desire to write a biography on Ganesan began in 1974, and he began collecting resources the same year. In 1996, after Narayanaswamy retired from UNICEF, he believed it was the right time to begin writing the book; Ganesan too agreed to talk to him. After Narayanaswamy spent over a year collecting press material related to Ganesan published between 1952 and 1996, he was ready to ask Ganesan questions. Ganesan saw numerous factual errors in the press material collected by Narayanaswamy, who then emphasised the need for Ganesan to "set things right". Ganesan asked him if he could write a book "as it comes out of my mouth", and the biography was changed into an autobiography.

The book is told in the manner of a Q&A format, from nearly 80 hours of audio recordings; according to Narayanaswamy, Ganesan told him that by following the Q&A format, "there won't be any editorial licence or pussy-footing; instead, it will be all that I've experienced, as I've seen and felt it, and you'll record it without changing anything". Narayanaswamy spent four years working on the book. Over 2000 photographs of Ganesan had been collected for using in the book, but only 200 were used. The recordings of the conversations between Ganesan and Narayanaswamy are stored at the archives of All India Radio, Chennai.

== Release ==
The book was originally published in Tamil under the title Enathu Suya Sarithai on 1 October 2002, exactly one year after Ganesan's death, and the English translated version by Sabita Radhakrishna was released in 2007 on the same date. Ganesan's sons Prabhu, Ramkumar and nephew Giri Shanmugam said the profits made from the book sales would be donated to "education and social development projects" sponsored by the publisher Sivaji Prabhu Charities Trust. While the Tamil original has 310 pages, the English version has 250 pages.

== Reception ==
Sachi Sri Kantha criticised the book for omitting numerous aspects of Ganesan's life, stating, "As an autobiographer, Sivaji’s performance – like many of his movies – provides glimpses of some class in a flop, leaving much to be desired [...] But for fans of Sivaji, it is a good memento to cherish." Writing for India Today in 2013, Sadanand Menon compared Tamil film actors' biographers to the ones "who light a candle to look at the sun ... The few books till now in this genre have crashed on the rock-bed of a comprehensive incomprehension of the audience base of the Tamil film star ... Sivaji Ganesan's Autobiography of an Actor (2007) is but a series of snippets from interviews done by T.S. Narayana Swamy."
