= Bommai (1964 film) =

1964 film by S. Balachander

- Theatrical poster
- Directed by: S. Balachander
- Written by: Ve. Lakshmanan (dialogue)
- Produced by: S. Balachander
- Starring: S. Balachander; L. Vijayalakshmi; V. S. Raghavan
- Cinematography: N. Prakash
- Edited by: K. Govintha Swami
- Music by: Songs: S. Balachander; Background score: D. B. Ramachandran
- Production company: SB Creations
- Release date: 25 September 1964
- Country: India
- Language: Tamil

Bommai (transl. The Doll) is a 1964 Indian Tamil-language thriller film, directed by S. Balachander. Featuring a walking-talking doll as the main character, the film had an ensemble cast of newcomers, while S. Balachander, L. Vijayalakshmi and V. S. Raghavan appeared in prominent roles. The film is based on Alfred Hitchcock's 1936 British film Sabotage (an adaptation of Joseph Conrad's 1907 novel The Secret Agent). It was released on 25 September 1964.

== Plot ==
Somasundaram(S. Balachander), a wealthy businessman, summons his office staff members and bids farewell to Aanandan, Mani, Sampath(Sadan), and Prabhakar as he plans to go to Singapore from Chennai shortly. But Somasundaram refuses to disclose the exact reason for the journey and said it would take about 10 days. He met his business partner, Jagadish(V. S. Raghavan), on his way to the airport and said goodbye to him too. It is revealed to us that Jagadish is related to a murder case in Singapore a few years ago, before joining as a partner at Somasundaram's business. Jagadish sensing this, Somasundaram's Singapore journey may lead to the end of his business partnership, as the murder issue would come to light. So, as a team, Mani, Sampath, and Prabhakar join hands with Jagadish to kill Somasundaram. Prabhakar plants a powerful bomb and fixes it inside a walking doll. They plan to give the doll to Somasundaram at the airport and ask him to present it to the particular address in Singapore. The address card is pasted on the stomach of the doll. So when Somasundaram pulls out the card, it triggers the lever, and the bomb will explode within seconds.

The trio goes to the airport in a hurry, and their car breaks down in the middle. So Mani and Sampath hire a taxi and go to the airport. Due to a misunderstanding, they left the doll in the taxi. When Prabhakar arrives at the airport and hears this out, he spills the secret without noticing Aanandan is nearby. A kind-hearted Aanandan goes in search of that taxi to find the bomb doll with Prabhakar's sister, Mallika(L. Vijayalakshmi).

The doll in the taxi goes to a family, an orphanage, a blind beggar, and finally to a doll shop. Meanwhile, Jagadish's group also searches for that taxi to retrieve the doll, but it goes in vain. So they abducted Aanand, as he knows their plan and would go to the police. Prabhakar says that if there were more time for flight departure, he would make another bomb doll similar to this, as it requires just half an hour. At the time the doorbell rings, to everyone's surprise, Somasundaram stands in front of Jagadish. He says the flight is rerouted to Chennai due to some technical problems, and one hour is left for the next flight. Though Somasundaram didn't want to go to Singapore again, Jagadish compelled him so that they could repeat their plan as scheduled this time.

So Sampath is sent to buy a new doll from the shop to fix the bomb inside it. There he finds the same doll that they had already planted the bomb. Unknown to this, Sampath buys the doll and brings it. In between, the group prepared a new bomb and attached it to another doll. The team goes to the airport, meets Somasundaram, and hands him the newly made doll. While returning, a doubt had arisen that the bought doll was the one that they had made earlier. When Jagadish checks the doll and finds the address card, everyone is shocked. Sampath pulls out the card in anxiety, and the bomb explodes inside the car and kills all of them instantly. Back in the airport, Somasundaram is saved by the taxi driver, who knows all of these with the help of Mallika and Aanandan.

== Cast ==
- S. Balachander as Somasundaram
- L. Vijayalakshmi as Mallika
- Ramesh as Anandan
- Lakshmirajam
- V. S. Raghavan as Jagadish
- Srinivasan as Prabhakar
- Maali as Mani
- Sadan as Sampath
- V. Gopalakrishnan as Manikkam
- S. N. Lakshmi as Manikkam's mother
- P. D. Sambandam
- Anandan
- Murthi
- Shoba

== Production ==
Balachander, who was known for his critically acclaimed suspense thriller films Andha Naal (1954) and Avana Ivan!? (1962) made Bommai on the same genre. The film was inspired by Alfred Hitchcock's 1936 British film Sabotage. Balachander made a few changes in the script to suit the tastes of Tamil audience. A walking-talking doll, which carries the bomb, played the main character in Bommai. To cast the doll, Balachander was in search for a long time and even tried one from the United States. Incidentally, while shopping in Parry's Corner, he found the right doll in a roadside shop and bought it. While Balachander wrote the story and screenplay, his friend Ve. Lakshmanan wrote the dialogues. Rochelle Shah appeared as an actress, this being the only film she ever acted in. Bommai is the first Tamil film in which the director introduces the cast and crew verbally, rather than using film credits.

== Music ==
The soundtrack consisted of six songs, all written by Balachander's associate Ve. Lakshmanan. The music for songs, was composed by Balachander himself, while the background score was composed by D. B. Ramachandran. The philosophical song "Neeyum Bommai Naanum Bommai" marked the playback singing debut of K. J. Yesudas in Tamil cinema. In 2014, when the song was recreated for Moodar Koodam, Yesudas recorded the same for Moodar Koodam, coincidentally marking his completion of 50 years in the Tamil film music industry. The following song list was adapted from a book authored by G. Neelamegam.

Song	Singer/s	Duration
"Engo Pirandhavaraam"	P. Susheela	03:29
"Thathi Thathi Nadandhuvarum Thangapapa"	L. R. Eswari	03:27
"Nee Thaan Selvam Nee Thaan Amudham"	P. Susheela	04:07
"Kanne Iruttudhu Kaade Adaikkudhu"	Harihara Subramaniam & K. Veeramani	
"Neeyum Bommai Naanum Bommai"	K. J. Yesudas	03:40
"Kaiyaruge Kaniyirukka"	Renuka	

== Release and reception ==
Although completed and censored in 1963, the film was released only on 25 September the following year. The Indian Express wrote though "the film fails to grip"; however "A neat, tidy, suspense packet". The reviewer praised the film's cinematography but criticised the background score and editing. On 11 October 1964, Ananda Vikatan wrote, "You will not realise how time flies by watching this film". The film completed 100 days in many theatres in Madras. Its commercial success helped Balachander recover from the loss incurred on his previous film Avana Ivan.

== Sources ==
- Dhananjayan, G. (2011). The Best of Tamil Cinema, 1931 to 2010: 1931–1976. Galatta Media. OCLC 733724281.
- Sampath, Vikram (2012). Voice of the Veena S Balachander. Rupa Publications. ISBN 978-81-291-2969-7.
