= Nadu Iravil =

1970 film by S. Balachander

- Poster
- Directed by: S. Balachander
- Story by: S. Balachander
- Based on: And Then There Were None by Agatha Christie
- Produced by: S. Balachander
- Starring: S. Balachander; Major Sundarrajan; Pandari Bai; Sowcar Janaki
- Cinematography: K. V. S. Reddy
- Edited by: K. Govindasamy
- Music by: S. Balachander
- Production company: S. B. Creations
- Distributed by: S. B. Creations
- Release date: 1970
- Running time: 148 minutes
- Country: India
- Language: Tamil

Nadu Iravil (/nədʊ ɪrəvɪl/ transl. In the middle of the night) is a 1970 Indian Tamil-language crime thriller film, directed and produced by S. Balachander. The film's story was written by him and dialogue was written by Ve. Laxmanan, who also composed the music. It is based on Agatha Christie's 1939 novel And Then There Were None.

== Plot ==
Dhayanandam is a rich old man living in a sole home on an island with his mentally-ill wife Ponni and a few servants. Their doctor Saravanan reveals Dhayanandam's cancer has spread beyond cure and he has only a few days to live. So he makes arrangements for all of Dhayanandam's siblings to visit him and stay with him during his last few days. Dhayanandam is still extremely mad at his siblings for treating him badly in the past because he married Ponni, a woman from a lower caste. He thinks they are the reason behind Ponni's mental illness, but still allows them to stay in his house.

During the next few days, Dhayandam's relatives are murdered one after the other. Remaining guests start blaming Ponni, Dhayanandham and Saravanan and want to leave the island, which does not have any means to communicate with the outside world. But Dhayanandham says that won't be possible without his permission and forces them to stay until the killer is found. Saravanan asks Dhayanandham to distribute his wealth to his siblings, but Dhayanandham refuses to cooperate until the killer is found.

Jambu is Dhayanandham's youngest brother who has lost his legs and eyes in the military. Ponni and Dhayanandham take a special liking to Jambu's son Ragini. Dhayanandham permits Jambu to leave the island, but Jambu refuses. The next night, Ragini sees a mysterious man who looks like Dr. Saravanan from behind, push her dad Jambu with his wheel chair down the stairs. Jambu survives the fall and Ragini accuses Dr. Saravanan. But everyone, including Jambu himself, say the killer must have been someone else who looks like Dr. Saravanan from behind. The same night, someone pushes Ponni from the rooftop and kills her. A completely distraught Dhayanandham declares he is willing all his wealth to Rangini.

Dhayanandham asks Ragini to play the piano to calm him down. And when she is playing, the masked killer in Dr. Saravanan's clothes tries to stab her from behind. But Dhayanandham shoots the killer down. Rest of the family is all relieved that the killer is dead, when the Doctor appears at the top of the stairs, surprising everyone.

Ragini unmasks the killer and it is revealed he is none other than Jambu. Before dying, Jambu confesses he was neither a cripple nor blind, and Ragini is not his daughter but just his nurse. He carried out all the killings so that he could be the only person remaining to inherit Dhayanandham's wealth. He had asked Ragini to act as his daughter saying that was the only way Dhayanandham would allow her inside his house.

Per Ragini's request, Dhayanandham splits his wealth to all his siblings and his servants, and succumbs to his disease.

== Cast ==
- Major Sundarrajan as Dhayanandam
- Pandari Bai as Ponni (Dhayanandam's wife)
- S. Balachander as Dr. Saravanan
- Sowcar Janaki as Ragini
- Cho Ramaswamy as Servar Mose
- V. Gopalakrishnan as Ranga Rajan, (Somanathan's Son-in-law/Leela's husband)
- V. R. Thilagam as Leela (Ranga Rajan's wife)
- M. S. S. Pakkiyam as Neelamegham's wife
- E. R. Sahadevan as Neelamegham
- K. Vijayan as Aravindhan (Vadivambal elder son)
- V. S. Raghavan as Jambulingam (Dhayanandam's younger brother / blind man)
- Sadhan as Kalyam (Aravindan's younger brother)
- Kottappuli Jayaraman as Joseph (Dhayanandam's house servant)
- Maali alias Mahalingam (Mohanambal's son)
- S.N.Lakshmi as Vadivambal (Dhayanandam's sister)
- C. V. V. Banthulu as Somanathan
- Kalpana as Anu Radha (Neelamegham's daughter)
- S. R. Janaki as Mohanambal (Dhayanandam's sister in law)
- Ramanujam as Mottaiyan
- Saroja as Pankajam (Mottaiyan's daughter)

== Production ==
After the success of Bommai (1964), S. Balachander launched a film named Nadu Iravil the same year. It was based on the 1939 novel And Then There Were None, by the British writer Agatha Christie. Unlike the novel, it features the characters in an urban house rather than being stranded on an island.

== Soundtrack ==
The soundtrack was composed by S. Balachander, while the lyrics for the songs were written by Ve. Laxmanan.

Song	Singer	Length
"Kann Kattum Jadaiyile"	P. Susheela	06:11
"Kann Kattum Jadiyile" (pathos)	P. Susheela	07:00
"Naalu Pakkam Yeri"	L. R. Eswari	04:27
"Naalu Pakkam Yeri" – 2	L. R. Eswari	03:23

== Release and reception ==
Though Balachander completed the film in 1964–1965, no distributor was willing to buy it, prompting him to distribute the film himself. Nadu Iravil was eventually released in 1970 and became a major success, prompting several distributors who earlier rejected the film, to return and beg Balachander for distributing it. The Indian Express wrote, "The movie succeeds as a very good entertainer entirely due to the directorial work of S. Balachander and Reddi's camera".
