= Koteeswaran =

1955 film by Sundar Rao Nadkarni

- Theatrical release poster
- Directed by: Sundar Rao Nadkarni
- Screenplay by: Sundar Rao Nadkarni; Kangeyan
- Based on: Haach Mulacha Baap by B. V. Warerkar
- Produced by: Sundar Rao Nadkarni; B. Radhakrishna
- Starring: Sivaji Ganesan; Padmini; S. Balachander; Ragini
- Cinematography: G. K. Ramu
- Edited by: Sundar Rao Nadkarni
- Music by: S. V. Venkatraman
- Production company: Sri Ganesh Movietone
- Distributed by: Bell Pictures
- Release date: 13 November 1955
- Country: India
- Language: Tamil

Koteeswaran (transl. Millionaire) is a 1955 Indian Tamil-language comedy film co-written, co-produced, edited and directed by Sundar Rao Nadkarni. The film stars Sivaji Ganesan, Padmini, S. Balachander and Ragini. Based on B. V. Warerkar's Marathi play Haach Mulacha Baap, it revolves around two friends setting out to fight against the dowry system in their village. The film was released on 13 November 1955.

== Plot ==
Chandar and Kannan are friends. They return to their village after completing their studies, but are shocked by the prevalence of the dowry system. They both set out to fight against it.

== Cast ==
Male cast

- Sivaji Ganesan as Doctor Chandar
- S. Balachander as Pasupathy
- Sriram as Kannan
- K. A. Thangavelu as Rao Bahadur Ramasami
- Sirukalathur Sama as Jakamba
- Sattam Pillai Venkatraman as Rangu Pillai
- A. Ganesh Singh as Servant Karuppan

Female cast

- Padmini as Neela
- Ragini as Kamala
- Rushyendramani as Parvathi
- Baby Saraswathi as Usha
- Baby Rajakumari as Rani

Male support cast

- M. A. Ganapathi Bhat, S. V. Shanmugam, Vijaymani.

== Production ==
Koteeswaran is based on Haach Mulacha Baap, a Marathi play written by B. V. Warerkar. It was directed by Sundar Rao Nadkarni who also produced the film with B. Radhakrishna under Sri Ganesh Movietone, and wrote the screenplay alongside Kangeyan. The dialogues were written by Thanjai N. Ramaiah Dass and Kangeyan. Cinematography was handled by G. K. Ramu, the art direction by D. S. Kotkavngar and the editing by Nadkarni. The final length of the film was 16,246 feet (4,952 m).

== Soundtrack ==
The music was composed by S. V. Venkatraman.

Song	Singers	Lyrics	Length
"Ulaavum Thendral Nilaavai"	A. M. Rajah, P. Susheela	Thanjai N. Ramaiah Dass	03:35
"Palikumaa, Kanavuthaan Palikumaa"	P. Susheela	Thanjai N. Ramaiah Dass	
"Vandhadu Yogam Vaazhvile"	P. Leela, Jikki	Thanjai N. Ramaiah Dass	
"Arullilaarkku...Bagavaane Kelaiiyaa Pachondhi"	P. Leela	Thanjai N. Ramaiah Dass	03:21
"Madhu Nilai Maaraadha...Gaanatthaale Kaadhalaaginene"	Jikki	Thanjai N. Ramaiah Dass	03:29
"Yaazhum Kuzhalum"	A. M. Rajah, P. Susheela	T. K. Sundara Vathiyar	03:50
"Kattikko Thaali Kattikko"	S. V. Venkatraman, P. Leela	Gemini Seetharaman	06:16
"Isai Amudham Pol Undo"	P. Leela	Papanasam Sivan	03:27
"Ennudalum Ullak Kaadhalum Unakke"	M. L. Vasanthakumari	Papanasam Sivan	02:27

== Release and reception ==
Koteeswaran was released on 13 November 1955, Diwali day. The Indian Express wrote, "Crisp and spicy dialogue is the highlight" of the film.
