= S. Jayalakshmi =

Indian actress and singer (1920–2007)

- Born: July 24, 1920; Kandy, Sri Lanka
- Died: July 21, 2017 (age 96); Chennai, India
- Occupations: Actress, singer
- Years active: 1934–1948

Sundaram Jayalakshmi (25 July 1920 - 21 July 2017) was an Indian Tamil-language film actress and singer who played lead parts in movies of the 1930s and 1940s. Starting her film career with Seetha Kalyanam in 1934, she acted in about a dozen movies, her most remembered role being in the 1943 movie Sivakavi. She was the sister of musicians S. Rajam, S. Balachander, and dancer S. Ammakutty (1926-1941) .

== Early life ==
Jayalakshmi was born on 25 July 1920 in Kandy, Sri Lanka. to Sinhalese lawyer V. Sundaram Iyer and his wife Parvathi. In 1933, when V. Shantaram wanted to make a Tamil movie and placed an advertisement in Sight and Sound magazine, Sundaram Iyer came forward to help him and as a result the whole family travelled to Kolhapur to make their debut in the movie Seetha Kalyanam with Jayalakshmi playing the heroine (Seetha) and her older brother Rajam as the hero Rama.

== Death ==
Jayalakshmi died at her residence in Besant Nagar, Chennai of natural causes at 6 AM on 21 July 2017.
