= Anandha Jodhi =

- Theatrical release poster
- Directed by: V. N. Reddy; A. S. A. Sami
- Written by: Javar Seetharaman
- Produced by: P. S. Veerappa
- Starring: M. G. Ramachandran; Devika
- Cinematography: J. G. Vijayam
- Edited by: C. P. Jambulingam
- Music by: Viswanathan–Ramamoorthy
- Production company: Hariharan Films
- Distributed by: Emgeeyaar Pictures
- Release date: 5 July 1963
- Running time: 154 minutes
- Country: India
- Language: Tamil

Anandha Jodhi (transl. Flame of Happiness) is a 1963 Indian Tamil-language drama film, directed by V. N. Reddy and A. S. A. Sami. The film stars M. G. Ramachandran and Devika. The film, produced by P. S. Veerappa and written by Javar Seetharaman, was released on 5 July 1963.

== Plot ==
Anand, a physical education teacher in a school, is falsely accused of a murder. As he is on the run trying to prove his innocence, he can count only on his beloved Jodhi and her younger brother, playful Balu, Anand's schoolchild. How will Anand prove his innocence?

== Cast ==
- M. G. Ramachandran as Anandhan
- Devika as Jodhi
- M. R. Radha as Punyakodi
- S. A. Ashokan as Inspector Baskar
- S. V. Sahasranamam as Muthaiah Pillai
- S. V. Ramadas as Abhu Salim
- Javar Seetharaman as CID Sundar
- Kamal Haasan as Balu
- P. S. Veerappa as Jambu
- Manorama as Mano
- Karikol Raju as Anandhan's father

== Production ==
Ananda Jodhi was jointly directed by V. N. Reddy and A. S. A. Sami and was produced by actor P. S. Veerappa under the company Hariharan Films. The film's story and dialogues were written by Javar Seetharaman. Cinematography was handled by J. G. Vijayam, and editing by C. P. Jambulingam. This was the only film in which Devika and M. G. Ramachandran acted together.

== Soundtrack ==
The music was composed by Viswanathan–Ramamoorthy, with lyrics by Kannadasan. The song "Kaalamagal" is set in Shubhapantuvarali raga. The song "Ninaikka Therindha" is set in Natabhairavi raga.

Song	Singers	Length
"Kaala Magal"	P. Susheela	03:32
"Kadavul Irukkindraar"	T. M. Soundararajan	04:23
"Ninaikkath Therindha"	P. Susheela	04:24
"Oru Thaai Makkal Naam"	T. M. Soundararajan	04:00
"Pala Pala pala pala Rakamaa Irukkuthu poottu"	T. M. Soundararajan	03:06
"Paniyillaatha Maargazhiyaa"	T. M. Soundararajan, P. Susheela	03:31
"Poiyiley Piranthu"	T. M. Soundararajan, P. Susheela	04:49

== Release and reception ==
Ananda Jothi was released on 5 July 1963, and distributed by Emgeeyar Pictures in Madras. Writing for Sport and Pastime, T. M. Ramachandran gave a positive review praising Ramachandran's performance as "convincing" and other actors and also praised Viswanathan–Ramamoorthy's music. Kanthan of Kalki also gave a positive review for various aspects, including the cinematography, cast performances (especially that of Haasan) and Seetharaman's writing. The film was dubbed Telugu-language as Donga Bangaram and released on 30 October 1964.
