= Avana Ivan!? =

1962 film

- Theatrical release poster
- Directed by: S. Balachander
- Screenplay by: S. Balachander; Viduvan K. Lakshmanan
- Based on: An American Tragedy by Theodore Dreiser
- Produced by: S. Balachander
- Starring: S. Balachander
- Music by: S. Balachander
- Production company: SB Creations
- Release date: 31 August 1962
- Country: India
- Language: Tamil

Avana Ivan!? (transl. Is that him!?) is a 1962 Indian Tamil-language thriller film directed by S. Balachander. The film was an adaptation of the 1951 American film A Place in the Sun, itself adapted from the novel An American Tragedy written by Theodore Dreiser. The novel itself was based on the Gillette murder case that happened in the early 20th century.

== Plot ==
Kumar kills his wife Sumathi to marry another woman, Vaasanthi. The murder is witnessed by two children, who are on a picnic along with other children who later expose the truth. In the end, the murderer is arrested and taken away by the police; he winks at the children who exposed him and says "ta ta".

== Cast ==
Male cast

- S. Balachander as Kumar
- Ramesh as Kannan
- Master Sridhar as Venu
- V. S. Raghavan as Rajaram
- Serukalathur Sama as Sadhanandam
- Pattom Sadan as Rajaram's Cook
- Kottapuli Jayaraman as Assistant
- P. D. Sambandam as Teacher
- Vidwan Ve. Lakshmanan as Inspector Rajan
- S. G. Eswar as Eswar

Female cast

- Vasanthi as Jamuna
- Baby Padmini as Meena
- Lakshmi Rajam as Sumathi
- C. K. Saraswathi as Parvatham
- S. N. Lakshmi as Amrthavalli
- Thilakam Rajakumari as Valli
- Shanthini as Ponnamma

== Production ==
The film was an adaptation of the American film A Place in the Sun, based on the novel An American Tragedy written by Theodore Dreiser. The novel was inspired by the Gillette murder case that shook America in the early part of the 20th century. The original film was a major success in India. S. Balachander was much impressed with the film and tried to remake the film in Tamil, thus making his production debut. He named his company S. B. Creations, the first time the word "Creations" was used in a South Indian film for a film production company.

== Soundtrack ==
The soundtrack was composed by S. Balachander, with lyrics by Vidhvan Ve. Lakshmanan.

Song	Singer	Length
"Kalyaana Ponnu Kalangaathey Kannu"	L. R. Eswari & Renuka	04:07
"Kalyaana Tirunaal"	P. Susheela	
"Manam Vittu Siritthittu"	Renuka, Seetha & Kamala	03:07
"Vali Vali Valli"	Pattom Sadan & Renuka	03:33
"Varanamayeram Soozha Valam Sei"	Radha Jayalakshmi	

== Release and reception ==
The Indian Express wrote, "In story, treatment, music and in the style of dialogue delivery, Avana Ivan? is said to set a new pattern in film-making". Before the making of the film, it was reported that Balachandar sent blank cheques to the cast and crew. The film failed to make an impact at the box office.
