= Kumkuma (disambiguation) =

Kumkuma, also known as Kungumam, most often refers to a red colour powder used for social and religious markings in India.

Kumkuma or kumkum may also refer to:

- Kumkum (actress) (1934–2020), Indian actress
- Kumkum - Ek Pyara Sa Bandhan (2002–2009), an Indian television series
- Kunkhumam, a 1963 Indian Tamil-language film
- Kungumam (magazine), a Tamil weekly entertainment magazine
