= Savithiri (1980 film) =

- Theatrical release poster
- Directed by: Bharathan
- Written by: A. L. Narayanan (dialogues)
- Screenplay by: Padmarajan
- Starring: Vinoth; Menaka; J. V. Ramana Murthi Nanditha Bose
- Cinematography: Ramachandra Babu
- Edited by: N. P. Suresh
- Music by: M. S. Viswanathan
- Production company: Lena Productions
- Release date: 5 December 1980
- Country: India
- Language: Tamil

Savithiri is a 1980 Indian Tamil-language drama film directed by Bharathan. A remake of his 1975 Malayalam film Prayanam, Savithiri marked Bharathan's debut in Tamil cinema. The cast includes Vinoth, Menaka, J. V. Ramana Murthi, Manorama, Nanditha Bose and Master Suresh. The screenplay was written by Padmarajan who also scripted the original film. The film was released on 5 December 1980.

== Cast ==
- Vinoth
- Menaka as Savithri
- J. V. Ramana Murthi
- Master Suresh
- R. Manorama
- Nanditha Bose
- Nithya
- V. S. Raghavan

== Production ==
The film was launched at Vauhini Studios along with the song recording of "Mazhaikaalamum".

== Soundtrack ==
Soundtrack was composed by M. S. Viswanathan.

Track listing
No.	Title	Singer(s)	Length
1.	"Vazhndhal Unnodu"	Vani Jairam
2.	"Mazhai Kaalamum"	Vani Jairam, P. Jayachandran
3.	"Kanni Iravin"	M. S. Viswanathan
4.	"Manmadhan Baanathai"	L. R. Eswari, Malaysia Vasudevan

== Release and reception ==
Savithiri was released on 5 December 1980. Nalini Sastry of Kalki praised the performances of the cast, Viswanathan's music, cinematography and short dialogues and concluded that director Bharathan who had brought the film without a hitch was only afraid with the ending. The film failed to match the success of the original, and became controversial upon release for the depiction of its principal characters who belong to the Brahmin community. This led to widespread protests by members of the community in Madras.

== See also ==
- Portrayal of Tamil Brahmins in popular media
