= Parasakthi (1952 film) =

Indian film by Krishnan–Panju

- Theatrical release poster
- Directed by: Krishnan–Panju
- Screenplay by: M. Karunanidhi
- Based on: Parasakthi by Pavalar Balasundaram
- Produced by: P. A. Perumal Mudaliar
- Starring: Sivaji Ganesan; S. V. Sahasranamam; S. S. Rajendran; Sriranjani Jr.; Pandari Bai
- Cinematography: S. Maruti Rao
- Edited by: Panjabi
- Music by: R. Sudarsanam; Background score: Saraswathi Stores Orchestra
- Production company: National Pictures
- Distributed by: AVM Productions
- Release date: 17 October 1952
- Running time: 188 minutes
- Country: India
- Language: Tamil

Parasakthi (/pəˈrɑːsəkθi/ transl. The Supreme Goddess) is a 1952 Indian Tamil-language satirical drama film directed by Krishnan–Panju and written by M. Karunanidhi. The film stars Sivaji Ganesan, S. V. Sahasranamam, S. S. Rajendran, Sriranjani Jr., and Pandari Bai. It is the cinematic acting debut of Ganesan and Rajendran. Based on Pavalar Balasundaram's play of the same name, Parasakthi narrates the misfortunes that befall the members of a Tamil family during World War II.

Central Studios initially planned on creating a film based on the Parasakthi play and T. S. Natarajan's play En Thangai; however, the idea was dropped after Natarajan objected. The film rights of Parasakthi were later bought by P. A. Perumal of National Pictures, with the patronage of A. V. Meiyappan. The soundtrack was composed by R. Sudarsanam, cinematography was handled by S. Maruti Rao, and Panju edited the film under the alias "Panjabi". Filming began in mid-1950, but took over two years to complete.

Parasakthi was released on 17 October 1952, during the festive occasion of Diwali, and faced controversies because of its portrayal of Brahmins and Hindu customs and practices in a negative light. The elitarian society including the then ruling State government even demanded that the film be banned. Despite these protests, the film was praised for its dialogues and the actors' performances, and became a commercial success with a theatrical run of over 175 days. Parasakthi acquired cult status in Tamil cinema and became a trendsetter for dialogues and acting for later Tamil films.

== Plot ==
Chandrasekaran his wife Saraswati, and his two brothers Gnanasekaran and Gunasekaran are Indian immigrants living in Rangoon, Burma. Their younger sister Kalyani was raised in their hometown Madurai, Tamil Nadu by their father Manickampillai. In 1942, during World War II, the three brothers and Saraswati plan to visit Madurai to attend the impending wedding of Kalyani to a writer named Thangappan. Due to the ongoing war and bombardment of Burmese ports by Japan, the shipping company offers only one ticket; Gunasekaran, the youngest brother, takes it and leaves for Tamil Nadu. The ship fails to reach on time due to the dangers of the war, and Kalyani's marriage takes place without any of her brothers present.

Kalyani becomes pregnant. But on the day she delivers her child, Thangappan dies in an accident and Manickampillai dies of shock, leaving Kalyani and her child destitute. Her house gets auctioned off, and she makes her living by selling food on the streets. Gunasekaran, after being stranded at sea for several months, finally arrives in Tamil Nadu at Madras. However, while watching a dance performance, he is robbed of all his belongings after being intoxicated. Impoverished, he becomes enraged at the status of the once glorious Tamil Nadu, and fakes insanity by indulging in numerous tricks to make a living. Gunasekaran finally comes across his destitute sister at Madurai, having learned of their father's death and her poverty. He continues to play insane and does not reveal his true identity to her due to his poverty, but hovers around her. Kalyani is irritated by the stranger's behaviour, unaware that he is her brother.

Kalyani is nearly molested by a vagabond named Venu, but is saved by Gunasekaran. She later leaves Madurai and arrives at Tiruchi, where she obtains work as a maid of blackmarketeer Narayana Pillai, who also tries to molest her. She is saved by his wife, and leaves the job. While searching for his sister, Gunasekaran reaches Tiruchi and comes across Vimala, a wealthy woman, to whom he explains the miserable status of him and his sister in the society. After resting in her house for a while, he silently leaves to continue searching for Kalyani.

As Japanese shelling intensifies in Burma, Chandrasekaran and Gnanasekaran decide to return to India. Chandrasekaran, accompanied by Saraswati, reaches Tiruchi safely and becomes a judge, but Gnanasekaran is lost in the journey and loses a leg in the shelling before arriving in India. He begs for a living, forms an association for beggars and tries to reform them. Kalyani reaches Chandrasekaran's palatial house seeking food, but Chandrasekaran throws her out without recognising her. She later arrives at a temple seeking help, but the pujari also tries to molest her. Frustrated with life and unable to feed her child, Kalyani throws it into a river and attempts suicide, but is soon arrested for killing the child and brought for trial.

At the court, Kalyani defends her act of infanticide with the judge being Chandrasekaran, who after hearing her story realises she is his sister, and faints. Gunasekaran is also brought to the court for having attacked the pujari who tried to molest his sister. During his trial, Gunasekaran explains the misfortunes which have befallen him and his family, and justifies his actions. Gunasekaran's valiant defence in the court awakens everyone on the ills of the society. As the trial proceeds, Vimala arrives and produces Kalyani's child, which was revealed to have safely fallen in her boat instead of the river. Kalyani and Gunasekaran are pardoned and acquitted by the court, and reunite with Chandrasekaran. Gnanasekaran, while collecting donations for his association of beggars, also joins them unexpectedly. With Vimala and Gunasekaran deciding to get married, the family subsequently inaugurates a welfare home for orphans.

== Cast ==
Male cast

- Sivaji Ganesan as Gunasekaran
- S. V. Sahasranamam as Chandrasekaran
- S. S. Rajendran as Gnanasekaran
- Duraisami as Manikkam Pillai
- T. K. Ramachandran as Venu
- K. M. Nambirajan as Vellai Sami
- Venkatraman as Thangappan
- V. K. Ramasamy as Narayana Pillai
- K. P. Kamakshi as the pujari
- M. N. Krishnan as Kuppan
- Sakthivel as the Servant
- D. V. Narayanasami as Thambidurai
- V. K. Karthikeyan as Tamil Pandit

Female cast

- Sriranjani as Kalyani
- Pandari Bai as Vimala
- Susheela as Saraswathi
- Kannamma as Jolly
- Angamuthu as the fruit seller
- Muthulakshmi as Kantha
- A. S. Jaya as Parvathi

Dance

- Kumari Kamala
- Kusalakumari

Additionally, Kannadasan makes an uncredited appearance as a judge.

== Production ==
=== Development ===
Parasakthi was a popular 1950s Tamil play written by Pavalar Balasundaram, a Tamil scholar. Around the same time, En Thangai (My Sister), written by T. S. Natarajan, became popular. Sivaji Ganesan, at that time a struggling stage actor, played the lead role in En Thangai. The pre-production crew at Central Studios, Coimbatore, initially planned to merge these two plays to make a film. However, Natarajan disagreed with the idea, and sold the rights of the play to another producer. En Thangai was made into a film with the same name.

Later, film distributor P. A. Perumal of National Pictures, with the patronage of A. V. Meiyappan of AVM Productions, bought the film rights of Parasakthi. The duo Krishnan–Panju were signed on to direct at Meiyappan's suggestion, and M. Karunanidhi, who would later become the Chief Minister of Tamil Nadu, was signed to write the script. The cinematography was handled by S. Maruti Rao, while the songs were choreographed by Heeralal. Panju edited the film under the alias "Panjabi".

=== Casting and filming ===
Ganesan was chosen to play the male lead, making his cinematic acting debut. Perumal cast Ganesan after being impressed with his performance as Nur Jahan in the Sakthi Nadaga Sabha play of the same name. It was he who, in 1950, gave Ganesan a flight ticket to Madras for the screen test for Parasakthi. Ganesan had simultaneously shot for the Telugu-Tamil bilingual film Paradesi / Poongothai, which almost became his first release, but was delayed after Perumal requested its co-producer Anjali Devi to let Parasakthi release first. Ganesan had earlier dubbed for actor Mukkamala in the 1951 Tamil film Niraparadhi.

Parasakthi did not begin well for Ganesan. When shooting began and 2000 feet of the film was shot, Meiyappan was dissatisfied with Ganesan's "thin" physique, and wanted him replaced with K. R. Ramasamy. Perumal refused, and Ganesan was retained. Meiyappan was also satisfied with the final results of the film. The initial scenes of Ganesan which he earlier disliked were reshot. Karunanidhi later recalled that Ramasamy was unable to accept the film due to other commitments. Ganesan was paid a monthly salary of ₹250 (about US$52.5 in 1952 (Note: The exchange rate between 1948 and 1966 was 4.79 Indian rupees (₹) per 1 US dollar (US$).)) for acting in the film. S. S. Rajendran, another successful stage artist, also debuted in Parasakthi after the advice of politician C. N. Annadurai. According to historian Film News Anandan, Parasakthi was one of the few films at that time to be "completely driven" by stage artists.

Rajasulochana was initially cast as the female lead, but opted out due to her pregnancy, and was eventually replaced by Sriranjani Jr. Pandari Bai was added to the film, after Meiyappan was impressed with her performance in Raja Vikrama (1950). Poet Kannadasan declined to work as one of the film's lyricists, and instead acted in a minor role as a judge, as he was "determined to take part in the Parasakthi movie". A portrait of lawyer P. Theagaraya Chetty was used to portray the father-in-law of S. V. Sahasranamam's character Chandrasekaran. The film's climax song "Ellorum Vazha Vendum" featured stock footage of the politicians C. Rajagopalachari, E. V. Ramasamy, M. Bhaktavatsalam, Annadurai, and Karunanidhi. Although Ganesan began working on the film in mid-1950, it took over two years to complete.

== Themes ==
My intention was to introduce the ideas and policies of social reform and justice in the films and bring up the status of the Tamil language as they were called for in DMK policies.

— Karunanidhi, in 1970

Panju stated that Parasakthi was designed to "create havoc. Of course, it did. We were challenging the social law itself, the basic Constitution itself". The title song of the film was composed by Bharathidasan, keeping with the demand of the DMK party seeking a sovereign Dravidian nation. The poem glorifies the utopian nature of the Dravidian nation and ends with a long monologue that grieves the present India's reality. When the female lead Kalyani becomes pregnant, she and her husband Thangappan decide to name the child "Pannirselvam" if it is a boy, and "Nagammai" if it is a girl. The names are references to A. T. Pannirselvam, a prominent and respected leader of the Justice Party and Nagammai, a leading activist in the Self-Respect Movement and the wife of E. V. Ramasamy. According to film historian Selvaraj Velayutham, Parasakthi was basically oriented to social reform. United News of India (UNI), Malini Nair of The Times of India and K. S. Sivakumaran of the Sri Lankan newspaper Daily News have referred to the film as a satire, with UNI describing it as a "sociological satire".

The film deploys Kalyani's vulnerability as a widow in a hostile society, with consequent threats to her chastity, especially during the court trial scenes. The name Kalyani was chosen by the screenwriter to emphasise the contradiction between the meaning of her name indicating auspiciousness and her contrasting penury. The theme is expressed through Gunasekaran's arguments in the court : "[My] sister's name is Kalyani. An auspicious name [indeed]. But there is no 'mangalyam' around [her] neck". Also, Vimala, who becomes Gunasekaran's bride, compares herself to Kannagi, a popular symbol of chastity in Tamil culture. Ganesan, who enacted the role of Gunasekaran in Parasakthi, was a DMK activist in real life in 1952 and helped in propagating the theme of Dravida Nadu. The film attempted to bring to light the alleged fraud in the name of religion and presented agnostic views, displaying a powerful critique of the Congress rule in the Madras Presidency. Film historian Mohan Raman compared Parasakthi to Velaikari (1949), as both films featured a "court scene where the hero rids society of irrational beliefs and practices".

== Music ==
The music of Parasakthi was composed by R. Sudarsanam. The lyrics were written by Bharathidasan, Subramania Bharati, M. Karunanidhi, Annal Thango, Udumalai Narayana Kavi and K. P. Kamatchisundaram. The background score was composed by the Chennai-based Saraswathi Stores Orchestra. Relatively higher importance was given to the film's dialogues over its music, so the dialogues were sold separately on audio cassettes. Some of the numbers from Parasakthi were based on songs from Hindi and Pakistani Urdu films: one is a rehash from Akeli (1952), (Note: S. Theodore Baskaran's 1996 book The Eye of the Serpent does not make any mention of the song names.) "Poomalai" is a rehash of the song "Sanwariya, Tohe Koi Pukare" from Dupatta (1952), "Ill Vaazhviniley" is based on "Maine Dekhi Jag Ki Reet" from Sunehre Din (1949), "Puthu Pennin" is based on a song featuring Burmese woman in from Patanga (1949), (Note: Sachi Sri Kantha, writing for Ilankai Tamil Sangam, does not make any mention of the Hindi song names.) and one is based on the song "Milte Hi Ankhen Dil Hua" from Babul (1950). (Note: S. Jayaraman's 1991 book The Music of Ghulam Haider do not make any mention of the Tamil song names.) The number "Oh Rasikkum Seemane" inspired "Itai Tazhukikkolla" from Periyar (2007). The 2010 film Rasikkum Seemane borrows its title from the song of the same name, and the original song was remixed for the 2010 film. A cryptic reference 'Annave' appears in the number "Kaa Kaa Kaa", in the line "Kaakai Annave neengal azhagaana vaayaal pannaga paadureenga", which translates to "Crow elder, you are singing so melodiously with your beautiful mouth". It was written by Narayana Kavi. An album containing remixed versions of the songs of Parasakthi was released in on 3 June 2009, to commemorate Karunanidhi's 86th birthday.

Track listing
No.	Title	Lyrics	Singers	Length
1.	"Desam Gnanam Kalvi"	Udumalai Narayana Kavi	C. S. Jayaraman	3:26
2.	"Kaa Kaa Kaa"	Udumalai Narayana Kavi	C. S. Jayaraman	3:00
3.	"Nenju Porukku Thillaiye"	Subramania Bharati	C. S. Jayaraman	4:50
4.	"Ill Vaazhviniley"	Bharathidasan	T. S. Bagavathi, M. H. Hussain	2:07
5.	"Puthu Pennin"	K. P. Kamatchisundaram	M. S. Rajeswari	4:23
6.	"Oh Rasikkum Seemane"	K. P. Kamatchisundaram	M. S. Rajeswari	1:44
7.	"Ellorum Vaazha Vendum"	Annal Thango	T. S. Bagavathi, M. S. Rajeswari	1:35
8.	"Konju Mozhi Sollum"	K. P. Kamatchisundaram	T. S. Bagavathi	3:03
9.	"Poomaalai"	M. Karunanidhi	T. S. Bagavathi	3:01
10.	"Porule Illaarkku"	K. P. Kamatchisundaram	T. S. Bagavathi	3:37
11.	"Vaazhga Vaazhgave"	Bharathidasan	M. L. Vasanthakumari	5:00
Total length:				35:46

== Release ==
Sivaji Ganesan in Parasakthi 's climactic court scene

Parasakthi was released on 17 October 1952, on Diwali day. It was regarded as a "propaganda vehicle for a new political party" and marked the start of cinema's "starring role in Tamil politics". Ganesan's performance in the film's court scene was also very well received by audience, and was considered to have propelled him to stardom. The film became a major commercial success, running for over 175 days in several theatres, and was one of the first films to be screened at the Madurai-based Thangam theatre, which was noted as Asia's largest theatre at the time. It ran for over 50 days in all the 62 centres it was released, and at the Sri Lanka–based Mailan Theatre, it ran for nearly 40 weeks. Parasakthi's Telugu-dubbed version of the same name was released on 11 January 1957.

== Reception ==
Parasakthi received critical acclaim. P. Balasubramania Mudaliar of Sunday Observer wrote, "The story is simple but it has been made powerful by Mr. Karunanidhi by his beautiful dialogues. Mr. Shivaji Ganesan, who plays the main role dominates from the beginning to the end" and concluded, "If an Academy award were to be given to any picture, I have little doubt that this picture would be entitled on its merits to such an award." Dinamani Kadhir, a Tamil weekly owned by Indian Express Limited (then known as The Indian Express Group), carried an unusually long review of Parasakthi running into three closely printed pages. The review was given a cynical title, "Kandarva Mandalam" ("The Abode of Kandarvas") and it began with a small box-item which read, "Parasakthi: This goddess is abused in a Tamil film with her name". The reviewer opined, "The main aim of the film is to attach gods. Along with that, the government and society are overtly and covertly attacked. The embittered and agitated reviewer further claimed, "He [the hero of the film], acting as a mad man, threatens and beats the people on the street and grabs whatever they have and eats it. Then he goes to give repeatedly all those economics lectures, rationalist lectures and anti-god lectures. When we see the hero doing all that, it seems as if he is portraying the lives of those who are trying to force such ideas in the ...film." For the reviewer, thus, the DMK men were living on others' sweat and preaching unacceptable subversive ideas. The magazine Sivaji praised the dialogues by Karunanidhi, and the performances of Ganesan and Sahasranamam.

== Controversies ==
Post release, Parasakthi was marred by numerous controversies, and was defined as "one of the most controversial films in the history of Tamil cinema" by historian S. Theodore Baskaran. It was accused of trying to portray Brahmins in poor light. Abuse of Hindu customs and religious practices evoked strong protests from the Hindu orthodoxy. Scenes like a priest attempting to rape a woman in a temple were found to be very provocative. The social elite and members of the then ruling Congress party demanded the film to be banned. The-then Chief Minister of Madras, C. Rajagopalachari was unhappy with the extremely provocative nature of the film, but allowed it to be screened. One of the reasons stated by them was the dialogue spoken by Ganesan's character, "Just because you came around chanting names and offered flowers to the stone, would it become a god?", which was accused of "mocking the audiences." His reference to Goddess Parasakthi as a stone created a stir, and the word "stone" was eventually censored from the soundtrack. Six months after the film's release, the scene involving Ganesan's character emphasising idols as stone pieces and the scene where a character attempts to rape his sister were removed from the film. However, the given message was still "clear and the impact viral." The State Government requested the Union Government to reconsider the film certification, but they declined, due to a previous examination by a Madras intelligence officer, who stated:

The dialogues for the film have been specially written in a forceful manner by Sri M Karunanidhi, the well known leader of the Dravidian Progression Federation ... The film graphically describes the sufferings and hardships that a young widow with her baby in arms has to face due to poverty and how cruelly society treats her, or illtreats her. The substance of the story by itself is not objectionable. The plot is interesting and the story has a powerful moral appeal, namely that there will be ups and downs in a man's life and that chastity is the most precious jewel of womanhood.

— A Madras intelligence officer, who reviewed the film

In response to the negative review by Dinamani Kadhir that featured a poster titled Parabrahmam, Karunanidhi wrote and acted in a play of the same name along with Ganesan and other Dravida Munnetra Kazhagam members.

== Legacy ==
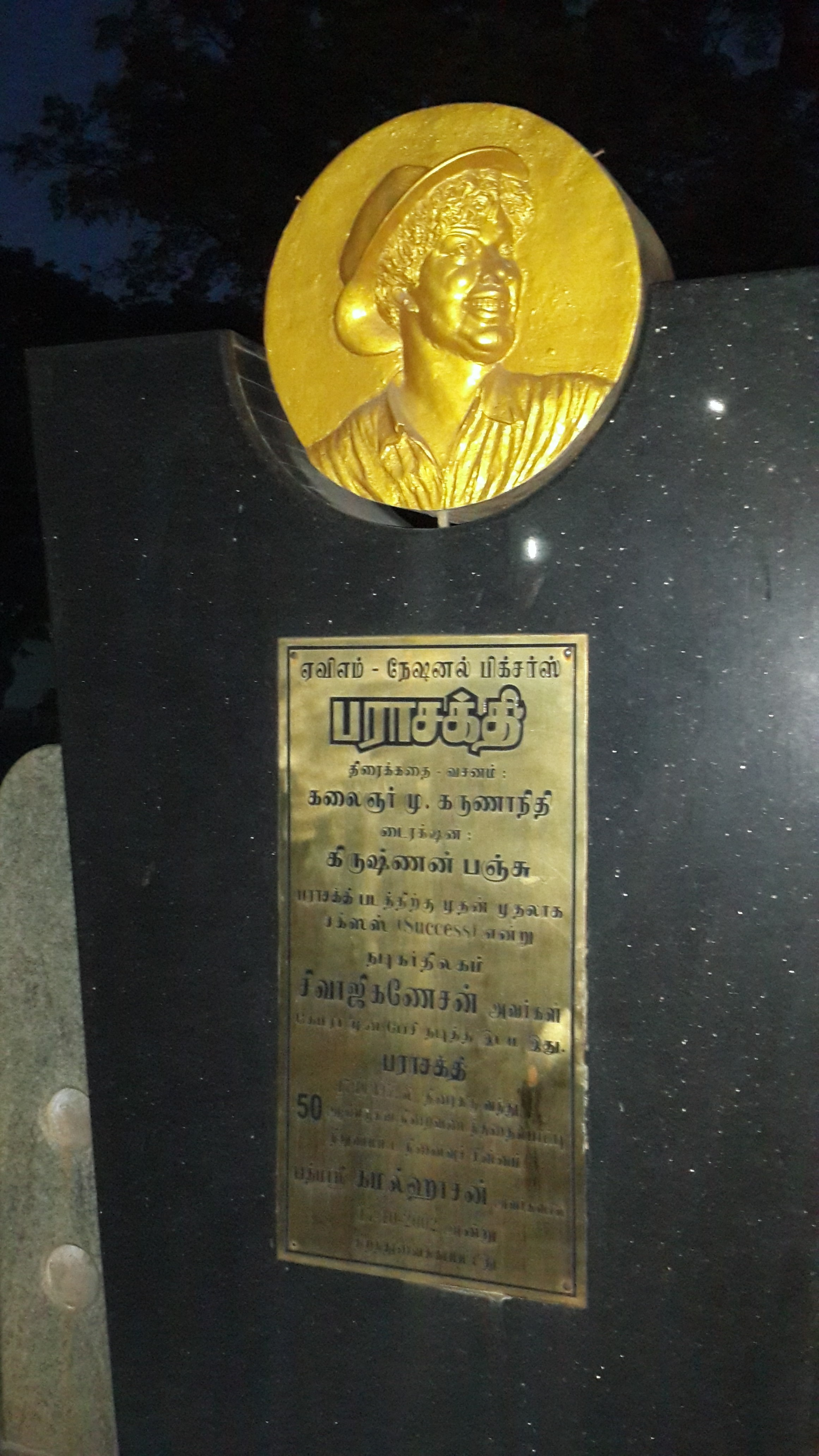
The memorial of Ganesan at AVM Studios, Chennai

Parasakthi acquired cult status and changed the character of Tamil cinema. Dialogue writing was given more importance than ever before. Speeches of the film replaced traditional music of artists like M. S. Subbulakshmi, K. B. Sundarambal and others at festivities. The film also had its share in giving the DMK the necessary stimulus to overthrow the Congress party in Tamil Nadu. The dialogues became so popular that "roadside entertainers used to recite long passages from the film in market area of Madras and collect money from bystanders", and memorising the film's dialogues became a "must for aspirant political orators". They were even released separately on gramophone records.

K. Hariharan, the director of L. V. Prasad Film Academy in Chennai, included the film in his 2013 list, "Movies that stirred, moved & shook us". According to Film News Anandan, after Parasakthi, Ganesan "became the dominant icon of the DMK", replacing K. R. Ramasamy. Historian S. Muthiah said that Parasakthi "showed Karunanidhi as the master of meaningful screen dialogue that carried forceful messages to the masses". In 2017, Kamal Haasan included the film in his list of 70 favourite movies, stating "This film changed the texture of society. A star was born – the ease with which Sivaji Ganesan walked through the film! His peers paled into insignificance. The writer was Karunanidhi. It was a film about social anger. I saw it much later; I understood it only then."

In celebration of the film's 50th year, Ganesan's autobiography, entitled Enathu Suya Sarithai (transl. My Autobiography) was released on 1 October 2002 in Tamil, exactly a year after the actor's death in 2001. The English version, titled Autobiography of an Actor: Sivaji Ganesan, October 1928-July 2001, was released exactly five years later in 2007. To commemorate 50 years since the release of Parasakthi, a memorial was inaugurated in AVM Studios on 17 October 2002 by Kamal Haasan in the presence of Ganesan's sons Prabhu and Ramkumar. The memorial stands at the same place where Ganesan first faced the camera. A slab of black granite, the memorial has on its top a brass medallion that bears a close-up of Ganesan uttering his popular opening line "Success". At its bottom is a rectangular plaque that gives details about the memorial's inauguration. At the base of the rectangular plaque are two other plaques resembling the pages of an open book and contains the names of the technical crew and all those involved in the making of the film. The visage of Ganesan wearing a hat was designed by Thota Tharani. The 2003 film Success, starring Ganesan's grandson Dushyanth Ramkumar, was named after Ganesan's popular line.

Parasakthi is included with other Ganesan films in Yettavathu Ulaga Athisayam Sivaji (Sivaji, the Eighth Wonder of the World), a compilation DVD featuring Ganesan's "iconic performances in the form of scenes, songs and stunts" which was released in May 2012. During the film's diamond jubilee year celebrations in January 2013, K. Chandrasekaran, then the president of Nadigar Thilagam Sivaji Social Welfare Association said, "Six decades down the line Parasakthi is remembered because it is not just a film, but an epic". On the centenary of Indian cinema in April 2013, Forbes India included Ganesan's performance in the film in its list, "25 Greatest Acting Performances of Indian Cinema". Actor Sivakumar stated, "You can’t reproduce movies like Parasakthi, Pasamalar, Devadas, Veerapandiya Kattabomman or Ratha Kanneer [...] By remaking such films, you are lowering yourself, while it enhances the original artists’ image."

Ganesan's in-film dialogue "Ambāḷ entak kālattilaṭā pēciṉāḷ, aṟivu keṭṭavaṉē?" ("When did the goddess ever speak, dimwit?) was parodied by Vadivelu's character in the film Ilaignar Ani (1994). Vivek parodied the film's climax in Palayathu Amman (2000). Karthi's performance in his debut film Paruthi Veeran (2007) was compared by critics with Parasakthi. Malathi Rangarajan, in her review of Citizen (2001) at The Hindu, mentioned that the court scene during the climax was reminiscent of Parasakthi's climax. In Sivaji (2007), the eponymous character (Rajinikanth) who shares his first name with Sivaji Ganesan, utters the dialogue, "Parasakthi hero da" ("The hero of Parasakthi, man") when referring to himself.

Film Heritage Foundation announced in March 2015 that they would be restoring Parasakthi along with a few other Indian films from 1931 to 1965 as a part of their restoration projects carried out in India and abroad in accordance to international parameters. The foundation, however, stated that they would not colourise any of the films as they "believe in the original repair as the way the master or the creator had seen it." In July 2016, Ganesan's other grandson Vikram Prabhu launched a production house named "First Artist" with a still of Ganesan from Parasakthi as part of its logo.

== See also ==
- Portrayal of Tamil Brahmins in popular media
- Tamil cinema and Dravidian politics

== Bibliography ==
- Baskaran, S. Theodore (1996). The Eye of the Serpent: An Introduction to Tamil Cinema. Chennai: East West Books. OCLC 243920437.
- Guy, Randor (2016). Memories of Madras: Its Movies, Musicians & Men of Letters. Creative Workshop. ISBN 978-81-928961-7-5.
- Kannan, R. (2010). Anna: The Life and Times of C.N. Annadurai. India: Penguin Books. ISBN 978-0-670-08328-2.
- Nakassis, Constantine V. (2016). Doing Style: Youth and Mass Mediation in South India. University of Chicago Press. ISBN 978-0-226-32785-3.
- Pandian, M. S. S. (March 1991). "Parasakthi: Life and Times of a DMK Film". Economic and Political Weekly. Vol. 26.
- Pillai, Swarnavel Eswaran (2015). Madras Studios: Narrative, Genre, and Ideology in Tamil Cinema. Sage Publications. ISBN 978-93-5150-212-8.
- Rajadhyaksha, Ashish; Willemen, Paul (1998) [1994]. Encyclopaedia of Indian Cinema. British Film Institute and Oxford University Press. ISBN 0-19-563579-5.
- Ramachandran, Naman (2012). Rajinikanth: The Definitive Biography. New Delhi: Penguin Books. ISBN 978-81-8475-796-5.
- Saravanan, M. (2013) [2005]. AVM 60 Cinema (in Tamil) (3rd ed.). Rajarajan Pathippagam. OCLC 1158347612.
- Velayutham, Selvaraj, ed. (2008). Tamil Cinema: The Cultural Politics of India's Other Film Industry. Psychology Press. ISBN 978-0-203-93037-3.
