= Pasamalar =

1961 film by A. Bhimsingh

- Theatrical release poster
- Directed by: A. Bhimsingh
- Screenplay by: A. Bhimsingh
- Story by: K. P. Kottarakkara
- Produced by: M. R. Santhanam; K. Mohan
- Starring: Sivaji Ganesan; Gemini Ganesan; Savitri
- Cinematography: G. Vittal Rao
- Edited by: A. Bhimsingh; A. Paul Duraisingh; R. Thirumalai
- Music by: Viswanathan–Ramamoorthy
- Production company: Rajamani Pictures
- Distributed by: Sivaji Productions
- Release date: 27 May 1961
- Running time: 180 minutes
- Country: India
- Language: Tamil

Pasamalar (/pɑːsəmələr/ transl. The Flower of Love) is a 1961 Indian Tamil-language drama film directed by A. Bhimsingh. The film stars Sivaji Ganesan, Gemini Ganesan and Savitri Ganesan, with K. A. Thangavelu, M. N. Nambiar and M. N. Rajam in supporting roles. It revolves around Rajasekhar and his bonding with his younger sister Radha. Radha falls in love with her brother's friend, and Rajasekhar eventually arranges their marriage. Problems they face form the story.

The story of Pasamalar was written by K. P. Kottarakkara, which Bhimsingh expanded into a screenplay, with Aaroor Dass writing the dialogues. The film was predominantly shot at Neptune Studios. It was produced by M. R. Santhanam and K. Mohan under the Rajamani Pictures banner. The film's original soundtrack was composed by M. S. Viswanathan and T. K. Ramamoorthy, while the lyrics were written by Kannadasan.

Pasamalar was released on 27 May 1961 and received critical acclaim with Ganesan and Savitri's performances being widely lauded. The film was also a commercial success, with a theatrical run of over 26 weeks, thereby becoming a silver jubilee film. The film won the Certificate of Merit for Second Best Feature Film at the 9th National Film Awards. It became a trendsetter resulting in similar themes about brother-sister relationships and was remade in Hindi, Telugu, Sinhala, Kannada and Malayalam languages. A digitally restored version of Pasamalar was released on 15 August 2013 and was also well received.

== Plot ==
Rajasekharan alias Raju becomes the guardian to his younger sister Radha after their parents' death. When the factory where Raju works is closed due to a labour problem and he is depressed, Radha gives him ₹1000 which she had earned and saved by making toys. She advises him to use this money as seed capital and commence his own toy business. Raju assents, and in a short time, becomes rich. Anand, a former colleague of Raju, is jobless and approaches Raju for work. Raju appoints him in his concern and over a period of time, Anand and Radha fall in love. Raju, who is very possessive of his sister, gets angry with Anand as he feels betrayed. However, knowing how intensely Radha loves Anand, he arranges their wedding.

After the marriage, Anand, along with his aunt and cousin, move into Raju's house. Raju marries Malathy, a doctor, on Radha's suggestion. All of them continue to live under the same roof and several misunderstandings arise. Anand's aunt uses every opportunity to widen the rift between Malathy and Radha and Radha and Anand. Unable to witness Radha's troubles, Raju moves out of the house with his wife. Through Radha, Anand's aunt serves a legal notice to Raju, demanding a share in the property for Radha. Malathy files a counter petition and the property is attached by the court, pending resolution. Unable to see Radha's sufferings, Raju withdraws the case. Still the families do not unite.

Radha delivers a girl and Malathy delivers a boy. After her child's birth, Malathy goes abroad for further studies, leaving the child with Raju. Unable to cope with the separation from his sister and to have peace of mind, Raju goes on a pilgrimage for several months. He returns on Diwali day and goes to meet Radha, but is denied entry by Anand's aunt. While going back, he saves a little girl from getting burnt by firecrackers and in the process, loses his eyesight. He is hospitalised and Radha rushes to the hospital to see her brother. Raju learns that the girl he saved is none other than his niece. Unable to cope with his inability to see them, he dies; Radha too dies holding his hand. Anand comes after and feels bad for Raju and Radha, and on their behalf, Anand takes care of Radha's daughter and Raju's son.

== Cast ==
- Sivaji Ganesan as Rajasekharan "Raju"
- Gemini Ganesan as Anand
- Savitri Ganesan as Radha

Supporting actors

- K. A. Thangavelu
- M. N. Nambiar as Bhaskar
- M. R. Santhanam
- K. D. Santhanam
- S. A. Kannan

Supporting actresses

- M. N. Rajam as Malathy
- M. Saroja
- P. S. Gnanam as Anand's aunt
- Sukumari as (Song Dancing Role)
- R. Bharathi
- 'Baby' Kanchana
- Baby Malathi

== Production ==
K. P. Kottakara, a Malayalam film producer and story writer, wrote a story about the everlasting relationship between a brother and sister, with the intention of making it a film. He approached A. Bhimsingh, a director who gained a reputation for making successful family drama films, and narrated the story to him. After listening to the story, Bhimsingh agreed to make it as the film that would become Pasamalar. Actor Sivaji Ganesan also liked the story, got to play the lead character of the brother Raju, and got his friends M. R. Santhanam and K. Mohan to produce the film on behalf of Rajamani Pictures. At the suggestion of Savitri, who was cast as the sister Radha, Aaroor Dass was hired to the dialogues.

Principal photography began at Neptune Studios on Christmas Day. Few scenes were shot at Ganesan's home in T. Nagar. A dialogue in the film that Raju tells Anand (Gemini Ganesan, not related to Sivaji) which translates to "You may switch off the electric lights here. But a small oil lamp will still be burning, and in that light, one man will toil. That man is this Raju" was inspired by a line Dass earlier told Sandow M. M. A. Chinnappa Thevar as a refusal to write for one of his films: "Even if it is only a small lamp, let it be exclusively mine. I will use it to light my life". On the day the climax with the highly emotional dialogue, "Kai Veesamma Kai Veesu" was being filmed, during the break, Sivaji refused to have lunch as he want to starve the whole day to get the perfect emotion and diction for the scene.

== Themes ==
According to Soorian Kasi Pandian, author of the 1996 book India, That Is, Sidd, Pasamalar means "Flower of Love". The term "Pasa" refers to brotherly love which involves sacrifices for his loved sister.

== Soundtrack ==
The music was composed by Viswanathan–Ramamoorthy, with lyrics by Kannadasan. "Vaarayen Thozhi Vaarayo" attained popularity, and has been played at many Tamil weddings. It is set in Abheri, a Carnatic raga. The song provided a major breakthrough for its playback singer L. R. Eswari.

Track listing
No.	Title	Singer(s)	Length
1.	"Anbu Malar"	M. S. Viswanathan	2:25
2.	"Engalukkum Kaalam Varum"	T. M. Soundararajan, P. Susheela	3:30
3.	"Malargalai Pol Thangai" (sad)	T. M. Soundararajan	1:58
4.	"Malargalai Pol Thangai"	T. M. Soundararajan	5:24
5.	"Malarnthum Malaradha"	T. M. Soundararajan, P. Susheela	5:10
6.	"Mayangugiraal"	P. Susheela	4:00
7.	"Paatondru"	K. Jamuna Rani	4:32
8.	"Vaarai En Thozhi Vaarayo"	L. R. Eswari	5:30
9.	"Yaar Yaar Aval"	P. B. Sreenivas, P. Susheela	4:02
Total length:			36:31

== Release and reception ==
Pasamalar was released on 27 May 1961. The film was a commercial success, running for over 26 weeks, thereby becoming a silver jubilee film. The Tamil magazine Ananda Vikatan called it a milestone film and mentioned that though films may come and go, this one would stay forever in the hearts of those who had a chance to see it. Kanthan of Kalki appreciated Aaroor Dass' dialogues and the songs, saying that despite certain flaws, Pasamalar (flower of love) was a vasamalar (flower of fragrance). The film won National Film Award for Best Feature Film in Tamil – Certificate of Merit for the Second Best Feature Film in 1962.It was included alongside various Sivaji-starrers in a compilation DVD Yettavathu Ulaga Athisayam Sivaji (Sivaji Ganesan: Eighth Wonder of the World), which was released in May 2012.

== Remakes ==
Pasamalar has been remade in number of languages. The first Hindi remake, Rakhi (1962) was directed by Bhimsingh, the director of the original. It was again remade in Hindi in 1986 as Aisa Pyaar Kahan. It was remade in Telugu as Rakta Sambandham (1962) with Savitri reprising her role, in Sinhala as Suhada Sohoyuro (1963), in Kannada as Vathsalya (1965), and in Malayalam as Santha Oru Devatha (1977).

== Legacy ==
The film became a trendsetter and inspired similar films of brother-sister relationships like Mullum Malarum (1978). In July 2007, S. R. Ashok Kumar of The Hindu asked eight Tamil film directors to list their all-time favourite Tamil films; four of them – K. Balachander, Balu Mahendra, Mani Ratnam, K. S. Ravikumar – named Pasamalar as one of the favourite films in Tamil. Ravikumar said "As a kid I saw 'Pasamalar' and cried. As an adult, each time I have seen it I was moved to tears. That is the power of the script and the performance of lead players". Playback singer Asha Bhosle noted that Pasamalar was the first Tamil film she had watched. Samy remarked that his directorial Kangaroo (2015) was a "modern day Pasamalar". Actor Sivakumar stated, "You can't reproduce movies like Parasakthi, Pasamalar, Devadas, Veerapandiya Kattabomman or Ratha Kanneer [...] By remaking such films, you are lowering yourself, while it enhances the original artists' image".

== In popular culture ==
Footage of Pasamalar is featured in the 2011 Tamil film Velayudham. Footage of the song "Malarnthu Malaratha" is featured in the opening scene of Jigarthanda (2014). It is also used in the 2019 film Petta and 2022 film Saani Kaayidham. Dialogues in Pasamalar were also used in the song "Yenga Annan" in Namma Veettu Pillai (2019). In the same year (1961), Sivaji and Savithri acted as the lead pair in Ellam Unakkaga. The film failed as audiences could not digest Sivaji and Savitri as lovers after seeing them as siblings in Pasamalar.

== Re-release ==
A digitally restored version of Pasamalar was released on 15 August 2013, during India's Independence Day. The digital conversion was done by Prasad EFX, Chennai. M. Suganth of The Times of India rated it 5 out of 5, saying "The restoration, cinemascope and audio conversion are pretty good while the trimming (by veteran editor Lenin, Bhimsingh's son) manages to retain the continuity to a large extent."

== Bibliography ==
- Pandian, Soorian Kasi (1996). India, That is, Sidd. Allied Publishers. ISBN 9788170235613.
- Rajadhyaksha, Ashish; Willemen, Paul (1998) [1994]. Encyclopaedia of Indian Cinema. British Film Institute and Oxford University Press. ISBN 0-19-563579-5.
