= Kunkhumam =

1963 film by Krishnan–Panju

- Theatrical release poster
- Directed by: Krishnan–Panju
- Screenplay by: Sakthi T. K. Krishnasamy
- Story by: Nihar Ranjan Gupta
- Produced by: K. Mohan
- Starring: Sivaji Ganesan; Sarada; S. S. Rajendran; C. R. Vijayakumari; R. Muthuraman
- Cinematography: S. Maruthi Rao
- Edited by: S. Panjabi; R. Vittal
- Music by: K. V. Mahadevan
- Production company: Rajamani Pictures
- Distributed by: Sivaji Films
- Release date: 2 August 1963
- Running time: 145 minutes
- Country: India
- Language: Tamil

Kunkhumam (transl. Kumkuma) is a 1963 Indian Tamil-language film directed by Krishnan–Panju and written by Sakthi T. K. Krishnasamy. The film stars Sivaji Ganesan, Urvashi Sarada (in her Tamil debut), S. S. Rajendran, C. R. Vijayakumari and R. Muthuraman. The film, produced by K. Mohan, was released on 2 August 1963.

== Plot ==
Sundaram and Gomathi are lovers; the latter is an orphan and lives with her uncle's family. Sundaram travels to the United States for further studies. When he returns four years later, he is shocked to see that his mother Vedhavalli is a widow and is told that his father Sambasivam committed suicide due to the disgrace that he was unable to pay back the loans.

Sundaram leaves for Bombay for an interview, where he comes across the murder of broker Govindan and is shocked to see that the murderer is Punniyakodi, who is later introduced as Gomathi's father in a police investigation. Sundaram helps Punniyakodi to escape and in turn is suspected by the police instead. Police Superintendent Raja is appointed to investigate the murder case. When Gomathi's uncle refuses to let her marry Sundaram, she leaves home, following Vedhavalli to Madurai. Sundaram travels back to Madras where he bumps into a certain Susila on the road. Sundaram finds Govindan's family and offers help, who initially refuses but later accepts when persuaded and explained to. While leaving Govindan's house, Sundaram learns that Punniyakodi is living as a fugitive, had changed his name as James and staying with a crook Kanthan. Sundaram seeks his friend Dass's help in taking care of Punniyakodi for the time being, goes to Madurai and explains to Vedhavalli and Gomathi that he is a murderer and wanted by the police, but Vedhavalli refuses to accept Sundaram as her son due to the conviction.

Sundaram, upon reading an advertisement in the newspaper, joins as a tuition teacher in disguise as Kalamegam. There, Sundaram learns that Susila's father is Justice Somanathan, her cousin is Inspector Raja, servants Arasan and Kanniyamma. Meanwhile, Superintendent Raja hatches a plan to move Vedhavalli and Gomathi to Dass's house so to ease the capture Sundaram if he happens to visit them, but James leaves Dass's home following Kanthan's temptation. Susila refuses Raja's advances and develops a soft corner for Kalamegam, but later learns that he is Sundaram and his deeds, but lies to Justice Somanathan that he is a good man. Susila also lets Sundaram escape when Raja finds out about this.

Vedhavalli, who is a staunch believer of justice, hates Sundaram for his conviction and arranges for Gomathi to marry Daas, but Gomathi refuses. In turn, Gomathi pleads to Sundaram to marry Susila as Susila had helped them out a lot to prove Sundaram's innocence before getting shot by the police, mistaken for Sundaram. A trial takes place where Sundaram accepts all the charges against him. A twist in the story occurs when Somanathan produces Punniyakodi and Kanthan in court. Punniyakodi admits in court that he was cheated by Kanthan into shooting broker Govindan, where Kanthan earlier had told Punniyakodi that the revolver was unloaded. Lastly, Punniyakodi admits that he is actually Sambasivam and was introduced as Punniyakodi to the police by Sundaram, who was only doing all these in order to save him. The judges sentence Kanthan for murder, further trials for Sambasivam and six months for Sundaram. At the end of the story, Sambasivam applies Kungumam to Vedhavalli at the request of Sundaram.

== Cast ==
- Sivaji Ganesan as Sundaram
- Sarada as Susila
- S. S. Rajendran as S. P. Raja
- C. R. Vijayakumari as Gomathi
- S. V. Ranga Rao as Punniyakodi / James / Sambasivam
- M. V. Rajamma as Vedhavalli
- S. V. Sahasranamam as Justice Somanathan
- R. Muthuraman as Dass
- Nagesh as Arasan
- Manorama as Kanniyamma
- S. A. Kannan as Chinnaiya
- Radhabhai as Rajamani
- O. A. K. Thevar as Kanthan / Govindhan
- K. R. Indira Devi as Rani

== Production ==
Ganesan dressed in drag for the film by wearing a sari.

== Soundtrack ==
The music was composed by K. V. Mahadevan. The songs "Chinna Siriya Vannaparavai" and "Thoongadha Kannendru" are set in the Carnatic ragas known as Darbari Kanada and Charukesi, respectively.

| Song | Singers | Length |
|---|---|---|
| "Chinna Siriya Vannaparavai" | T. M. Soundararajan & S. Janaki | 05:48 |
| "Kaalangal Thorum" | P. Susheela | 03:35 |
| "Kungumam" | Soolamangalam Rajalakshmi & P. Susheela | 02:50 |
| "Mayakkam Enadhu" | T. M. Soundararajan | 03:46 |
| "Poonthotta Kavalkara" | T. M. Soundararajan & P. Susheela | 03:49 |
| "Thoongadha Kannendru" | T. M. Soundararajan & P. Susheela | 03:59 |

== Reception ==
Writing for Sport and Pastime, T. M. Ramachandran called it "an utterly poor film" and also noted, "What amazes one is the complete absence of directorial touches of Krishnan and Panju [..] by giving the public such a crude film as Kunkhumam". The film failed at the box-office.
