= K. M. Annal Thango =

Indian Tamil scholar and freedom fighter (1904–1974)

- Born: Swaminathan; 12 April 1904 Gudiyatham, Madras Presidency
- Died: 4 January 1974 (aged 69) CMC Hospital, Vellore, Tamil Nadu

K. M. Annal Thango (12 April 1904 – 4 January 1974) was an Indian Tamil scholar, freedom fighter, writer, and lyricist. He contributed significantly to Tamil culture and literature and advocated for the adoption of the Thirukkural tradition in Tamil weddings.

== Life ==
K. M. Annal Thango was born as Swaminathan on 12 April 1904 in Gudiyatham, Madras Presidency, to Murugappa Mudaliar and Manickammal. Later, he adopted the name Annal Thango to align with the Thani Tamil Iyakkam (Tamil Purist Movement).

He joined the Indian National Congress in 1918 and participated in numerous protests for India's independence. In 1923, he was imprisoned twice, each time for three months, for picketing a lawyer's shop in Madurai. In 1927, he was arrested during the Neil Statue Satyagraha for attempting to damage the statue and was sentenced to one year of rigorous imprisonment. He also took part in the Nagpur Civil Lines protest, where he hoisted the national flag and shouted anti-British slogans, defying a government ban, resulting in seven months of rigorous imprisonment. Over the years, he was imprisoned five times for his involvement in the freedom movement. He briefly contributed to E. V. Ramasamy's Kudiarasu magazine during this period.

In 1934, Annal Thango organized Mahatma Gandhi’s visit to Gudiyatham. However, Gandhi’s decision to skip the public meeting arranged by Annal Thango caused a disagreement, leading him to resign from the Congress.

In 1936, he joined the Justice Party (then South Indian Liberal Federation). When the Justice Party merged with the Self-Respect Movement in 1944 to form the Dravidar Kazhagam, Annal Thango proposed renaming it "Tamil Kazhagam".

Annal Thango also made literary and cultural contributions. In 1927, he presided over his own wedding, introducing the Thirukkural tradition Tamil wedding, which replaced Sanskrit rituals with recitations from the Thirukkural. In 1942, he launched the magazine Tamil Nilam. He also wrote songs for Tamil films, including Parasakthi, Petra Manam, Pasiyin Kodumai, and Gomathiyin Kaadhalan.

Annal Thango died on 4 January 1974 at CMC Hospital, Vellore. In 2008, his works were declared national treasures by then Tamil Nadu Chief Minister M. Karunanidhi, recognizing his contributions to Tamil culture and literature. In 2024, a statue in his honor was erected in Kudiyatham, Vellore District at a cost of Rupees Fifty Lakh.
