= Ratha Kanneer =

1954 film by Krishnan–Panju

- Theatrical release poster
- Directed by: Krishnan–Panju
- Written by: Tiruvarur K. Thangaraj
- Based on: Ratha Kanneer by Tiruvarur K. Thangaraj
- Produced by: Perumal Mudaliar
- Starring: M. R. Radha; Sriranjani; S. S. Rajendran
- Cinematography: R. R. Chandran
- Edited by: S. Panjabi
- Music by: [C.S. Jayaraman back ground music Viswanathan–Ramamoorthy
- Production company: National Pictures
- Release date: 25 October 1954
- Running time: 151 minutes
- Country: India
- Language: Tamil

Ratha Kanneer (transl. Tears of Blood) is a 1954 Indian Tamil-language drama film directed by Krishnan–Panju, and written by Tiruvarur K. Thangaraj. Based on Thangaraj's play of the same name, the film stars M. R. Radha, Sriranjani and S. S. Rajendran, with Chandrababu, M. N. Rajam and S. R. Janaki in supporting roles. It revolves around a returned-from-abroad, westernised rich man who shows arrogance and contempt towards anything part of Indian culture and anyone below his social standards.

The film was produced by Perumal Mudaliar of National Pictures, and had Radha reprising his role from the play. Cinematography was handled by R. R. Chandran and editing by Panju under the alias S. Panjabi. The score was composed by Viswanathan–Ramamoorthy and the songs by C. S. Jayaraman, with lyrics by Mahakavi Bharathiyaar, Bharathidasan, Udumalai Narayana Kavi and Ku. Sa. Krishnamurthy.

Ratha Kanneer was released on 25 October 1954, during the week of Diwali. The film became a critical and commercial success, and Radha became a much sought-after artiste in Tamil cinema.

== Plot ==
Mohanasundaram is a philanderer, chain-smoker and drunkard. He does not respect elders, or people below his social standing. He is ruthless and even beats his own mother. Immediately upon his return to India, he is married to Chandra, a cultured, well-mannered, conservative Indian village girl. But he starts an affair with Kantha, a prostitute. His best friend Balu tries to advise him to mend his ways but Mohan turns a deaf ear. Mohan even fails to attend the last rites of his own mother as he wants to attend the birthday function of Kantha's mother. Mohan loses his mind over Kantha, even surrenders all his riches to her and also loses every loved one in his life. When he loses the last of his riches and close ones, he is struck down by leprosy. His life then turns upside down. With no money left for the treatment of his disease, he is totally ignored and despised by Kantha and her associates. She even locks him up in a room and treats him like an untouchable. In a few days, Kantha throws him out of her house and Mohan loses his eyesight soon after.

As a poor leper, Mohan wanders the streets to beg for food. In this last stage of his life, he learns the value of life itself and how to respect others. He feels remorseful for the way he treated his wife, mother and everyone else around him. He meets Chandra, his wife, who now lives a scarce life. Both do not recognise each other, as he is blind and she gets to see only his disfigured, leprosy-stricken face. He also meets his old best friend, Balu. The trio finally recognise each other. Mohan also learns through Balu about Kantha's death in an air crash. Mohan marries Chandra off to Balu, in the hope that she receives only love and care from a better man than Mohan. As a last request, he asks for a leper's statue to be risen in his likeness, to serve as warning for philanderers like himself. Some time after Mohan's death, a statue of him is erected per his request, and Balu breaks into a song about righteousness and values of life.

== Cast ==
- M. R. Radha as Mohanasundaram
- Sriranjani as Chandra
- S. S. Rajendran as Balu
- Chandrababu as the pimp
- M. N. Rajam as Kantha
- S. R. Janaki as Mohanasundaram's mother

Dance

- Kusalakumari
- Sayee–Subbulakshmi

== Production ==
=== Development ===
Ratha Kanneer was a stage play written by Tiruvarur K. Thangaraj. The play was first staged on 14 January 1949 in Tiruchirappalli, and was a success wherever it was staged, elevating its lead actor M. R. Radha to an icon in the field of Tamil theatre. The play was staged not only in South India but also in places like Malaya (now Singapore and Malaysia), Burma (now Myanmar) and Ceylon (now Sri Lanka) where it met with equal success. The director duo Krishnan–Panju decided to adapt the play into a feature film. AVM Productions who was supposed to produce the film backed out due to the negative approach of the plot. The film adaptation was produced by Perumal Mudaliar under National Pictures. Cinematography was handled by R. R. Chandran and editing by Panju under the alias S. Panjabi.

=== Casting and filming ===
Though many film producers of the period hesitated to cast Radha in their films because of his caustic attitude, Mudaliar decided he should reprise his role from the play. Radha agreed to join the film after his conditions were met, one of which was him acting only at night after he acted in stage plays during the day. The film marked the comeback of Radha to cinema after a long absence. M. N. Rajam was selected to portray the vamp Kantha, and had to put weight to portray the character. According to Rajam, no actress was willing to portray Kantha, but she agreed after she was approached by Krishnan–Panju. Rajam was hesitant to enact the scene where she had to kick Mohanasundaram (Radha's character) down from the staircase; she later relented after being requested by Krishnan.

While filming the climax where Mohan is seen joining his wife Chandra's (Sriranjani) hands to his friend Balu's (S. S. Rajendran), the directors were hesitant, believing that if the scene was featured in the film, people would not accept it and the scene would cause controversy. Radha threatened not to act further if the scene was not filmed, and shooting stopped for a few months. Eventually, the climax was filmed at the behest of Radha. Though during filming a remuneration was fixed for Radha, by the time filming ended he charged three times the agreed upon remuneration; his overall pay was ₹125,000 (equivalent to ₹14 million or US$140,000 in 2026). The final length of the film was 15,895 feet (4,845 m).

== Themes and influences ==
According to C. S. Lakshmi, Ratha Kanneer was built on a framework of purity and impurity. The title of the film meaning "Tears of Blood" refers to the tears of the wife who is pure. In Marja Evelyn Mogk's edited volume Different Bodies:Essays on Disability in Film and Television, Joyojeet Paal wrote that the film pairs "western debauchery with consequent traditional punitive reprisal in form of physical disfigurement" and also noted that the storyline of the film bears resemblance to Samba, son of the Hindu god Krishna. Writer Perumal Murugan feels the views of Mohan actually reflect those of E. V. Ramasamy, of whom Thangaraj was a follower. Researcher and ethnographer Preeti Mudliar compared Andha Naal (1954) to Ratha Kanneer because in both films, "the sin of foreignness is [neutralised] by a chaste Tamil woman, the virtuous wife".

== Soundtrack ==
The music director for the movie was C. S. Jayaraman while the background music was provided by Viswanathan–Ramamoorthy. The song "Kadhavai Saathadi" is set in the Carnatic raga known as Atana. The songs "Kutram Purindhavan" and "Aalai Aalai" attained popularity.

Song	Singers	Lyrics	Length
"Aalai Aaalai Paarkirrai"	T. V. Rathnam	Udumalai Narayana Kavi	02:59
"Kutram Purindhavan Vaazhkaiyil Nimmadhi"	C. S. Jayaraman	Ku. Sa. Krishnamurthy	03:44
"Kadhavai Saathadi"	M. L. Vasanthakumari		03:54
"Maalai Itta Mannan Yaaro"	T. V. Rathnam	Udumalai Narayana Kavi	02:59
"Tatti Parithaar En Vaazhvai"	T. S. Bagavathi		03:23
"Manidhar Vaazhvile Manam Adhu Pole"	A. P. Komala		03:12
"Vaalavayathaagi Azhagaagi Madhanaagi"	C. S. Jayaraman		03:04
"Pengale Ulaga Kangale"	T. S. Bagavathi		03:11
"Aalaiyin Sangge Nee Oothaayo"	M. L. Vasanthakumari	Bharathidasan	03:28
"Thannai Arindhu"	C. S. Jayaraman		03:18

== Release and reception ==
Ratha Kanneer was released on 25 October 1954, during the week of Diwali. The film emerged a critical and commercial success, with particular praise towards Radha's performance, and ran for over 100 days in theatres.

== Other versions ==
The play inspired an adaptation in Telugu starring Nagabhushanam, and later the Tamil film was dubbed into Telugu. After Radha's death, his eldest son Vasu played the protagonist in the play till his death, and at present donning the character is Radha's other son Ravi. In 2002, whenever the play was staged with Ravi starring, the plot was amended to show the protagonist suffering from HIV/AIDS.

Kannada actor Upendra saw the film and adapted the play and film into Kannada for the modern audience and appeared in the lead role, enacting M. R. Radha's role. Upendra, however, clarified that the Kannada version was not a remake. The film, titled Raktha Kanneeru, was directed by Sadhu Kokila. The film was released in 2003 and became a success. In August 2014, Vasu's son Sathish announced his intention to make another modern film version of the story, but those plans were cancelled due to his death in May 2015.

== Legacy ==
After the success of the film, Radha became a much sought-after artiste in Tamil cinema. In July 2007, S. R. Ashok Kumar of The Hindu asked eight Tamil film directors to list their all-time favourite Tamil films; Mahendran and Balu Mahendra named Ratha Kanneer as one of their favourite films in Tamil. Mahendran said: "Ratha Kaneer, has progressive ideas and great acting by M.R.Radha". Actor Sivakumar stated that "You can't reproduce movies like Parasakthi, Pasamalar, Devadas, Veerapandiya Kattabomman, or Ratha Kanneer [...] By remaking such films, you are lowering yourself, while it enhances the original artists’ image."

An exchange between Mohanasundaram and Balu is sampled as part of the outro in Yogi B's 2006 hit track, "Madai Thiranthu".

== Bibliography ==
- Dhananjayan, G. (2011). The Best of Tamil Cinema, 1931 to 2010: 1931–1976. Galatta Media. OCLC 733724281.
- Lakshmi, C. S. (2008). "A good woman, a very good woman: Tamil cinema's women". In Velayutham, Selvaraj (ed.). Tamil Cinema: The Cultural Politics of India's Other Film Industry. Psychology Press. ISBN 978-0-203-93037-3.
- Paal, Joyojeet (2013). "Physical Disability and Indian Cinema". In Mogk, Marja Evelyn (ed.). Different Bodies: Essays on Disability in Film and Television. McFarland. ISBN 978-1-4766-0621-7.
