= Vathsalya =

1965 Indian film by Y. R. Swamy

- Directed by: Y. R. Swamy
- Story by: K. P. Kottarakkara
- Based on: Pasamalar (Tamil)
- Starring: Rajkumar; Udaykumar; Narasimharaju; Shivaraj
- Cinematography: R. Madhu
- Edited by: R. Hanumantha Rao
- Music by: Vijaya Krishnamurthy
- Production company: Suchithra Movies
- Distributed by: Suchithra Movies
- Release date: 25 March 1965
- Country: India
- Language: Kannada

Vathsalya is a 1965 Indian Kannada-language film directed by Y. R. Swamy. The film stars Rajkumar, Udaykumar, Narasimharaju and Shivaraj. The musical score was composed by Vijaya Krishnamurthy. The film was a remake of the Tamil film Pasamalar. It was a major hit. Notably, this is the only film in which Leelavathi played the role of Rajkumar's sister.

== Cast ==
- Rajkumar as Rajasekhar
- Udaykumar as Anand
- Narasimharaju as Cheluvaraya
- Shivaraj
- Kuppuraj
- Ganapathi Bhat
- Krishna Shastry
- Nanjappa
- Siddaraj
- Siddalingappa
- Narayan
- Leelavathi as Radha
- Jayanthi as Malathi
- Papamma
- Rama
- Baby Ramamani
- Baby Sunitha

== Soundtrack ==
The music was composed by Vijaya Krishnamurthy.

No.	Song	Singers	Lyrics	Length (m:ss)
1	"Shramadi Naav Dudidhu"	P. B. Sreenivas, Jikki	Sorat Aswath	03:14
2	"Maagida Hannu"	P. B. Sreenivas, P. Susheela	Sorat Aswath	02:55
3	"mareyalagada indina"	P. Susheela	Sorat Aswath	02:55
4	"nee naachaleke"	P. Susheela	Sorat Aswath	02:55
