= National Pictures =

Parasurama softball

National Pictures is a former Indian film production and distribution company active from the 1950s to 1970s.

The company was founded by P. A. Perumal Mudaliar, and distributed more than 200 films. Shivaji Ganesan and M. R. Radha were introduced to Tamil cinema by this company. As of 2025, the company had not been producing films for a long time but was planning on releasing a remastered version of Parasakthi (1952) in theatres in 2027.

== Notable films ==
- Parasakthi (1952) - The first film starring Shivaji Ganesan
- Ratha Kanneer (1954) - The first film starring MR Radha
- Petra Manam (1960)
- Thangathurai (1972)
