= K. Mohan =

Indian film producer and art director (1926–2014)

- Born: 14 March 1926; Chennai, Tamil Nadu, India
- Died: 24 August 2014 (aged 89)
- Occupations: Art director, film producer
- Years active: 1950–2014
- Spouse: Shanthakumari
- Children: 8

K. Mohanakrishnan (14 March 1926 – 24 August 2014) also known as Pasamalar Mohan, or simply K. Mohan, was an Indian film producer and art director. He entered the movie industry in 1951, and worked mainly in Tamil cinema. He was the producer for the Tamil film Pasamalar (1961).

== Family and early life ==
Mohan was born into a Tamil family in Chennai. His father, T. Kannabiran Mudhaliyar, was the Madras High court Magistrate and the General Manager of five theatres (Prabhat Talkies, Broadway Talkies, Murugan, Mahalakshmi and Saraswati). His mother, Indirani Ammal, died when he was still young. It was also in his early years that he developed his love of drawing and painting. He married Shantakumari in 1951.

== Career ==
While still a student, Mohan created banners for the film Kulaebagavali. In 1950, he established Mohan Arts, a firm that specialized in the creation of promotional materials for films such as banners and cut-outs. An 80-foot (24 m) cutout that Mohan designed for Vanangamudi in 1957 was widely admired. His cutouts of Queen Elizabeth II during her visit to Chennai became famous throughout the city, and the Queen thanked him personally. His work for the film Gandhi won him nationwide attention. The actor Sivakumar started his art career under his guidance and in his company. Mohan was also an art director, and won various statewide and national awards for excellence, including the "Vikas Ratna" Award presented by the Government of India. He also won consecutive awards for his work publicizing films.

== Personal life ==
Mohan died on 24 August 2014, three years after his wife. The couple had five sons, three daughters and thirteen grandchildren. Two of Mohan's sons, Harinath Kumar and Narendran, inherited and continue to run Mohan Arts.
