= Portrayal of Tamil Brahmins in popular media =

Tamil Brahmins have been portrayed both positively and negatively in popular media. These portrayals extend across both literature and film.

Positive portrayals in literature date back to ancient works such as the Cilappatikaram and the Tolkāppiyam. In film, examples include Thyaga Bhoomi (1939), Vietnam Veedu (1970), and Tere Mere Sapne (1996).

On the other hand, negative portrayals, influenced by anti-Brahminism, also have many examples, such as The Folk Tales of South India (by Charles E. Gover) and Clarinda (1915, by A. Madhaviah). Films ridiculing or insulting Tamil Brahmins include Bhakta Nandanar (1935), Parasakthi (1952), and Nala Damayanthi (2003).

== Positive portrayals ==
=== In literature and print media ===
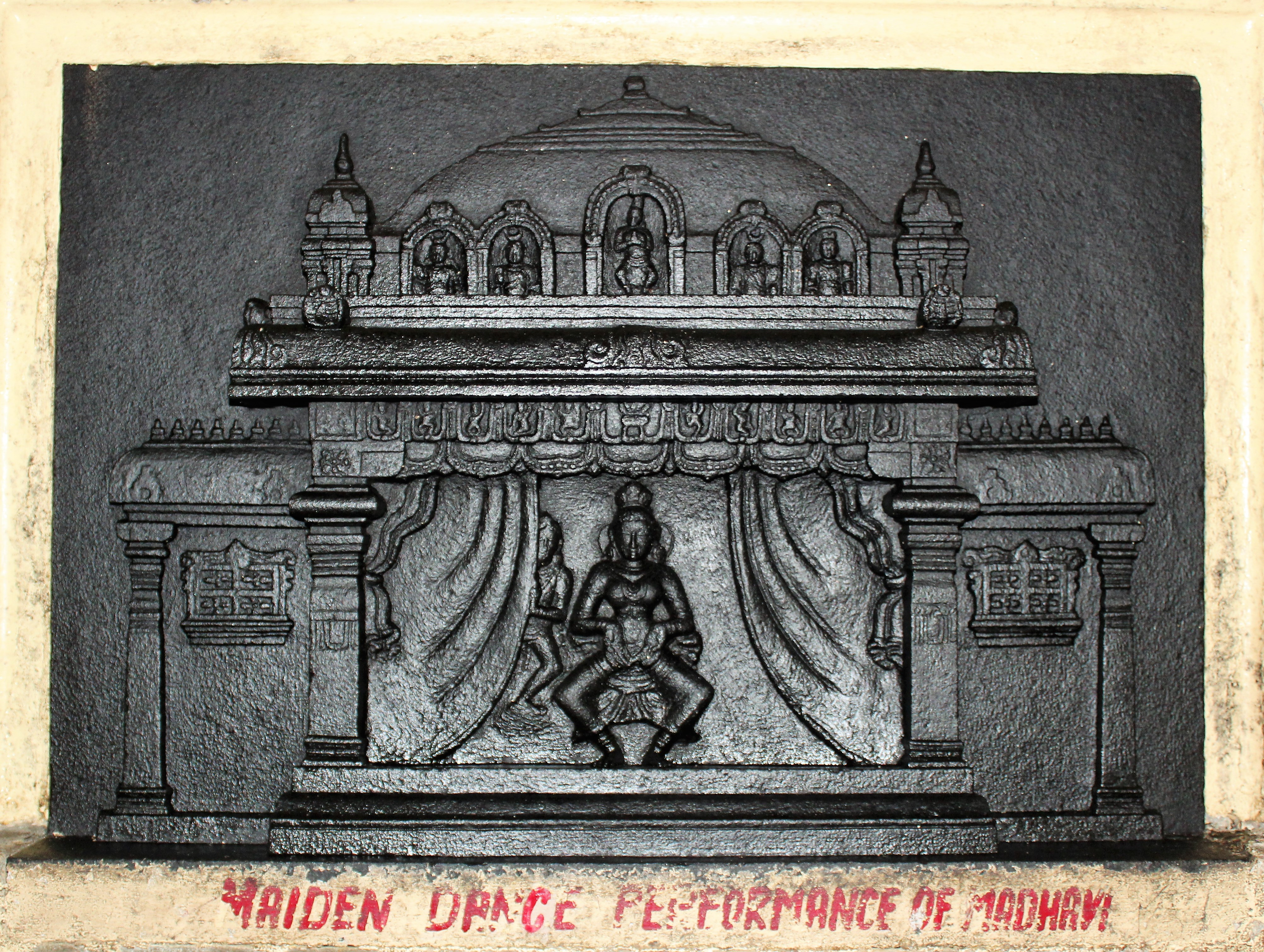
A statue from the Silappatikaram

There have been references to Brahmins even in the earliest period of Tamil literature. A sage named Gautama who served in the court of Senguttuvan's predecessor is praised in the Tamil work Silappatikaram. The Tolkāppiyam, which belongs to an earlier era, speaks of "the victorious Brahmin". One of the poems in the Puṟanāṉūṟu written by one Mulam Kilar of Avur praises the learning and character of a Brahmin Kauniyan Vinnam Tayan of Cholanadu. The poem praises his efforts and those of his ancestors in combating the penetration of Buddhism in the Tamil land. Kauniyan Vinnam Tayan is also praised for the faithful performance of sacrifices.

The Tamil novel had its beginnings in Mayuram Vedanayakam Pillai's Prathapa Mudaliar Charithram which appeared in 1879. The second Tamil novel was Kamalambal Charitram written by B. R. Rajam Iyer in 1893 and the third was Padmavathi Charitram written by A. Madhaviah in 1898. Both these novels portray the lives of Brahmins in rural parts of Madras Presidency.

In R. K. Narayan's famous book Swami and Friends he depicts the vagaries in the school-life of a young Iyer boy, Swaminathan, and how he and his family, especially his father, W. S. Srinivasan, deal with them. The book provides an interesting insight into father-son relations in traditional Iyer households in the early twentieth century, besides providing details of day-to-day life. Along with the text of the tale, the sketches to accompany it, by R. K. Laxman, in early editions, provide a wealth of information about the latter.

=== In films ===
Iyers have been positively portrayed in Hindi films such as Tere Mere Sapne. Malayalam films such as Iyer the Great and the Sethurama Iyer series which have fictitious Iyer characters in the lead.

There have always been movies in Tamil portraying Brahmin society and traditional values in a positive manner until 1970. The black-and-white era saw Tamil films as Thyagabhoomi and Vietnam Veedu.

Except for the film Aaha (1996), Tamil Brahmins have been portrayed negatively till date.

Recently, movies by S. Shankar, such as Gentleman and Anniyan, Ajith's film Aalwar and Simbu's film Silambattam has a Brahmin playing a protagonist character, where they use religion as one of the motivations, to get rid of corruption and other bad elements in society.

== Negative portrayals ==
=== In literature and print media ===
According to J. H. Hutton, there was opposition to Brahmins from Tamils as early as the 13th century AD.

During the Raj, anti-Brahminism was actively propagated by both British administrators as well as writers. J. H. Nelson, a popular administrator and writer, spoke of non-Brahmins as superior and degraded Tamil Iyers and Iyengars. Charles E. Gover's The Folk Tales of South India is replete with anti-Brahmin rhetoric. He remarks:

The Brahmans have corrupted what they could not destroy

Bishop Robert Caldwell, regarded as one of the instigators of the Dravidian Movement was vociferous in his attacks on Tamil Brahmins. V. Kanakasabhai Pillai, in his 1904 book, The Tamils 1800 years ago, holds Brahmins responsible for making a conscious attempt to "foist their system on the Tamils". Hindu savant Maraimalai Adigal, who founded the Pure Tamil Movement, in a book called Vellalar Nagareegam or The Civilization of the Vellalars published in 1923, said that the classification of Vellalars as Sudras were a part of an Aryan-Brahmin conspiracy and launched a veiled attack on Brahmin historians and intellectuals.

From 1930 onwards, with the rise of Periyar and the Justice Party, anti-Brahminism intensified to larger proportions. The periodicals and newspapers of the Justice Party such as Viduthalai and Justice launched scathing attacks on Brahmins. The works of Periyar as well as C. N. Annadurai's Aryamayai ridicules the rituals and practices of Brahmins and accuses them of propagating casteism and superstitions. Periyar's pattern of anti-Brahmin rhetoric was absorbed by his followers and the Dravidar Kazhagam, the cultural organisation that he established continues to indulge in vehement anti-Brahmin rhetoric in its magazines and periodicals, though popular support and enthusiasm for their anti-Brahmin tirade has died down with the passage of time.

There have also been novels criticising the patriarchal nature of Tamil Brahmin society and critically portraying the plight of Brahmin women A. Madhaviah, one of the earliest Tamil novelists, launched a sharp criticism of the sexual exploitation of young girls by older men in the 19th century upper caste society. His English novel Clarinda tells the story of a Brahmin woman who is saved from sati by a British soldier. She falls in love with the soldier and converts to Christianity on the death of her lover. In his Tamil novel Muthumeenakshi penned in 1903, he describes the plight of a Brahmin child widow. The story ends on a happy note with the remarriage of the widow as per her wishes. Ameen Merchant's The Silent Raga depicts the life of women in an agraharam as a gruesome endeavour.

In recent times, apart from sporadic outbursts of anti-Brahmin sentiment in newspapers and television, anti-Brahminism has largely subsided. Anti-Brahmin sentiment reached intense proportions on the occasion of the arrest of the Kanchi Shankaracharya and when Periyar's statue in Srirangam was defaced by activists of the Hindu Munnani.

=== In film ===
There have been an extensively large number of Indian movies in which Brahminical practices and customs have been ridiculed or broadly stereotyped and played for laughs. Some of the early Tamil films ridiculing the Brahminical orthodoxy as Nandanar (1935) and Seva Sadanam (1938) were by the Tamil Brahmin director K. Subrahmanyam. Nandanar was based on the tale of a rich Brahmin landlord called Vedhiyar who illtreated his farm-workers. The movie ends with Vedhiyar falling on the feet of a farmhand Nandan who worked in his fields on realising that the latter was blessed by Lord Nataraja. This scene generated a huge controversy as orthodox Brahmins objected to Vedhiyar falling on the feet of Nandan as Vedhiyar was incidentally played by Viswanatha Iyer who was a Brahmin in real life and Nandan was played by Dhandapani Desikar who belonged to a lower caste. In Subrahmnayam's Seva Sadanam, one of the actors Natesa Iyer drew flak from the Brahmin orthodoxy for acting in a controversial scene wherein he throws away his sacred thread.

When C. N. Annadurai and a few top leaders of the Dravidar Kazhagam left the organisation and formed a new political party called Dravida Munnetra Kazhagam and decided to contest elections, they viewed mass media as the most important tool to carry the ideology and principles of their new party to the masses. As a result, a number of films were made condemning what they regarded as "Brahmin oppression" and advocating social reform and atheism. The first important film attacking the Brahmin orthodoxy was Parasakthi which was a resounding hit and launched the career of Tamil actor Sivaji Ganesan. The film featured a controversial scene wherein a temple priest tries to rape a woman and was considered for a ban. However, the film became popular with the masses and triggered an era wherein many more films supporting the Dravidian ideology were made. Vedham Pudhidhu by Bharathiraja was one of the biggest hits of the 1980s. The story revolved around a non-Brahmin boy who learns music from a respected Brahmin . In the process, he falls in love with the priest's daughter and the duo prepare to elope when confronted by opposition from the society. In recent times, Iyers have been portrayed as conservative and narrow-minded in films as Avvai Shanmugi, Panchathanthiram, Dasavatharam and Seval.

There have also been a few non-Tamil films in which Iyers have been portrayed in a negative way. The portrayal of Iyers in Aparna Sen's Mr and Mrs Iyer can be viewed as negative, but it also shows a positive change in one's outlook due to the dramatic events that occurred.
