= List of films: U–W =

indexed lists of films
0–9	A	B	C	D	E	F
G	H	I	J–K	L	M	N–O
P	Q–R	S	T	U–V–W	X–Y–Z	

This is an alphabetical list of film articles (or sections within articles about films). It includes made for television films. See the talk page for the method of indexing used.

== U ==
- The U (2009)
- U, Bomsi n Me (2005)
- U, Me Aur Ghar (2017)
- The U Movie (2010)
- U pěti veverek (1944)
- U pokladny stál... (1939)
- U raskoraku (1968)
- U sredini mojih dana (1988)
- U2 3D (2008)
- U2 Live at Red Rocks: Under a Blood Red Sky (1983)
- U2360° at the Rose Bowl (2010)
- U-571 (2000)
- U-9 Weddigen (1927)
- U-Boat Prisoner (1944)
- U-Boote westwärts! (1941)
- U-Carmen eKhayelitsha (2005)
- UFO: (1956, 2018 & 2022)
- UFO Abduction (1989)
- The UFO Incident (1975 TV)
- UFO Robot Grendizer vs. Great Mazinger (1976)
- UFO: Target Earth (1974)
- U.F.O. (1993, 2013)
- UFOs: Past, Present, and Future (1974)
- UFOs: Seeing Is Believing (2005)
- UFOria (1985)
- UHF (1989)
- U.N. Me (2009)
- U.N.R.R.A. presents In the Wake of the Armies ... (1941)
- The U.P. Trail (1920)
- U.S. Marshals (1998)
- U.S. Seals II: The Ultimate Force (2001)
- The U.S. vs. John Lennon (2006)
- USS Cooper: Return to Ormoc Bay (2005)
- USS Indianapolis: Men of Courage (2016)
- U Turn (1997)
- U-Turn (1973)

=== Ub–Ud ===
- Ubalda, All Naked and Warm (1972)
- Ubaldo Terzani Horror Show (2010)
- Über Goober (2004)
- Ubojite misli (2006)
- Ubu et la Grande Gidouille (1979)
- Ubuntu (2017)
- Üç Korkusuz Arkadaş (1966)
- Ucha Dar Babe Nanak Da (2024)
- Uchakattam (1980)
- Uchathula Shiva (2016)
- Uchi Veyil (1990)
- Uchithanai Muharnthaal (2011)
- The Uchōten Hotel (2006)
- Uchu Daikaijū Dogora (1964)
- Uchu Enban Daisenso (1975)
- Uchū no hōsoku (1990)
- Ud i den kolde sne (1934)
- Udaan: (1997 & 2010)
- Udaharanam Sujatha (2017)
- Udal (2022)
- Udalaazham (2018)
- Udan Pirappu (1993)
- Udanchhoo (2018)
- Udanpirappe (2021)
- Udaya Geetham (1985)
- Udayam (1973)
- Udayam Kizhakku Thanne (1978)
- Udayam Padinjaru (1986)
- Udayanan Vasavadatta (1947)
- Udayananu Tharam (2005)
- Udayapuram Sulthan (1999)
- Udaykal (1930)
- Udayon (2005)
- Udedh Bun (2008)
- Udgharsha (2019)
- Udhaar (1949)
- Udhaar Ki Zindagi (1994)
- Udhaas (1993)
- Udhabaani (2009)
- Udhao (2013)
- Udhar Ka Sindur (1976)
- Udhavikku Varalaamaa (1998)
- Udhaya (2004)
- Udhayam NH4 (2015)
- Udhayan (2011)
- Udhyogastha (1967)
- Udta Punjab (2016)
- Udugan Yamaya (2007)
- Udumbara (2018)
- Udyaanalakshmi (1976)

=== Ue–Uk ===
- Ue o Muite Arukō: Sakamoto Kyu Monogatari (2005)
- Ue... paisano! (1953)
- Ufa con el sexo (1968)
- Uff! Yeh Mohabbat (1997)
- Ugadi: (1997 & 2007)
- Ugetsu (1953)
- Ugler i mosen (1959)
- Uglies (2024)
- Ugly (2014)
- The Ugly: (1997 & 2025)
- The Ugly American (1963)
- Ugly Aur Pagli (2008)
- The Ugly Boy (1918)
- The Ugly Dachshund (1966)
- UglyDolls (2019)
- The Ugly Duckling: (1920, 1931, 1939 & 1959)
- The Ugly Duckling and Me! (2006)
- Ugly Nasty People (2017)
- The Ugly Ones (1966)
- Ugly Me (2006)
- The Ugly Story (1966)
- The Ugly Swans (2006)
- The Ugly Truth (2009)
- Ugra Narasimham (1986)
- Ugramm (2014)
- The Uh-Oh! Show (2009)
- Uhlanga the Mark (2012)
- Ujala (1959)
- Ujeli: A Child Bride in Nepal (1992)
- Ujwadu (2011)
- Ukamau (1966)
- Ukare Gitsune Senbon Zakura (1954)
- Ukradená bitva (1972)
- Ukraine in Flames (1943)
- The Ukraine Hoax: Impeachment, Biden Cash, and Mass Murder (2020)
- Ukraine Is Not a Brothel (2013)
- Ukrainian Rhapsody (1961)
- Ukrainian Sheriffs (2015)
- Ukrainians in Exile (2022)
- Üks mu sõber (2011)

=== Ul ===
- Ula Leni (2019)
- Ulagam (1953)
- Ulagam Palavitham (1955)
- Ulagam Pirandhadhu Enakkaga (1990)
- Ulagam Sutrum Valiban (1973)
- Ulakam Chuttum Valiban (2011)
- Ulan (2019)
- Ułan Księcia Józefa (1937)
- Ułani, ułani, chłopcy malowani (1932)
- Ulath Ekai Pilath Ekai (2016)
- Ulavuthurai (1998)
- Ulbo Garvema (1917)
- Ulee's Gold (1997)
- Uli the Farmhand (1954)
- Uli the Tenant (1955)
- Ulice zpívá (1939)
- Ulidavaru Kandanthe (2014)
- Uljhan (1975)
- Uliyin Osai (2008)
- Ulkuthu (2017)
- Ulla, My Ulla (1930)
- Ullaasam (1997)
- Ulladakkam (1991)
- Ullam: (2005 & 2012)
- Ullam Ketkumae (2005)
- Ullam Kollai Poguthae (2001)
- Ullas (2012)
- Ullasa Paravaigal (1980)
- Ullasa Utsaha (2009)
- Ullasa Yaathra (1975)
- Ullasamga Utsahamga (2008)
- Ullasapoongattu (1997)
- Ullathai Allitha (1996)
- Ullathai Killathe (1999)
- Ullathil Kuzhanthaiyadi (1978)
- Ullathil Nalla Ullam (1988)
- Ulle Veliye (1993)
- Ulli and Marei (1948)
- Ulrike's Brain (2017)
- Ulsaha Committee (2014)
- Ulsavapittennu (1988)
- Ulta (2019)
- Ulta Palta: (1997 & 1998)
- Ulta Palta 69 (2007)
- Ulta Seedha (1985)
- Ulterior Motive (2015)
- Ulti Ganga (1942)
- The Ultimate Accessory (2013)
- Ultimate Avengers (2006)
- Ultimate Avengers 2: Rise of the Panther (2007)
- Ultimate Betrayal (1994)
- The Ultimate Christmas Present (2000 TV)
- Ultimate Deception (1999)
- Ultimate Force (2005)
- The Ultimate Gift (2007)
- Ultimate Hero (2016)
- The Ultimate Life (2013)
- The Ultimate Task (2013)
- Ultimate Teacher (1988)
- The Ultimate Thrill (1974)
- The Ultimate Vampire (1991)
- The Ultimate Warrior (1975)
- The Ultimate Weapon (1998)
- The Ultimate Winner (2011)
- Ultimate X: The Movie (2002)
- Ultimatum: (1938 & 2009)
- Ultime grida dalla savana (1975)
- Ultimo minuto (1987)
- Ultimo mondo cannibale (1977)
- Ultimo tango a Zagarol (1973)
- Ultimul cartuș (1973)
- Ultra (1991)
- Ultra Q The Movie: Legend of the Stars (1990)
- Ultra Reinforcement (2012)
- Ultra Warrior (1990)
- Ultrachrist! (2003)
- Ultraman: The Adventure Begins (1987)
- Ultraman series:
  - Ultraman: (1967 & 1979)
  - Ultraman, Ultraseven: Great Violent Monster Fight (1969)
  - Ultraman: Great Monster Decisive Battle (1979)
  - Ultraman Zoffy: Ultra Warriors vs. the Giant Monster Army (1984)
  - Ultraman Story (1984)
  - Ultra Q The Movie: Legend of the Stars (1990)
  - Ultraman Zearth (1996)
  - Ultraman Tiga & Ultraman Dyna: Warriors of the Star of Light (1998)
  - Ultraman Gaia: The Battle in Hyperspace (1999)
  - Ultraman Tiga: The Final Odyssey (2000)
  - Ultraman Cosmos: The First Contact (2001)
  - Ultraman Cosmos 2: The Blue Planet (2002)
  - Ultraman Cosmos vs. Ultraman Justice: The Final Battle (2003)
  - Ultraman: The Next (2004)
  - Ultraman Mebius & Ultraman Brothers (2006)
  - Ultraman Zero: The Revenge of Belial (2010)
  - Ultraman Saga (2012)
  - Ultraman Ginga Theater Special (2013)
  - Ultraman Ginga Theater Special: Ultra Monster Hero Battle Royal! (2014)
  - Ultraman Ginga S The Movie (2015)
  - Ultraman X The Movie (2016)
  - Ultraman Orb The Movie (2017)
  - Ultraman Geed the Movie (2018)
  - Ultraman R/B the Movie (2019)
  - Ultraman Taiga The Movie (2020)
  - Ultraman Trigger: Episode Z (2022)
  - Ultraman: Rising (2024)
- Ultramarines: A Warhammer 40,000 Movie (2010)
- Ultras (2020)
- Ultrasonic (2012)
- Ultrasound (2021)
- Ultraviolet (2006)
- Ulysses: (1954, 1967 & 2011)
- Ulysses Against the Son of Hercules (1962)
- Ulysses' Gaze (1995)
- Ulzana (1974)
- Ulzana's Raid (1972)
- Ulzhan (2007)

=== Um ===
- Um Crime no Parque Paulista (1921)
- Um das Menschenrecht (1934)
- Um Show de Verão (2004)

==== Uma–Umu ====
- Uma: (2013 & 2018)
- Uma Aventura na Casa Assombrada (2009)
- Uma Aventura no Tempo (2007)
- Uma Chandi Gowri Shankarula Katha (1968)
- Uma Longa Viagem (2012)
- Uma Maheswara Ugra Roopasya (2020)
- Uma Sundari (1956)
- Umaanilayam (1984)
- Umami (2022)
- Umapathi (2023)
- Umar (2006)
- Umar 55 Ki Dil Bachpan Ka (1992)
- Umar Marvi (1956)
- Umar Qaid (1975)
- Umbartha (1982)
- Umberto D. (1952)
- Umbracle (1972)
- Umbrage (2009)
- Umbrella (2007)
- The Umbrella (1933)
- The Umbrella Coup (1980)
- The Umbrella Woman (1987)
- The Umbrellas of Cherbourg (1964)
- Umeed (1962)
- Umeed (2017)
- Umformung: The Transformation (2016)
- Umi e, See You (1988)
- Umi no yarodomo (1957)
- Umizaru (2004)
- Umizaru 3: The Last Message (2010)
- Umka (1969)
- Umma: (1960 & 2022)
- Ummachu (1971)
- Ummadi Kutumbam (1967)
- Ummeed (1941)
- Umoja: The Village Where Men Are Forbidden (2008)
- Umrao Jaan: (1981 & 2006)
- Umrao Jaan Ada (1972)
- Umrika (2015)
- Umurage (2002)
- Umurah (1999)
- Umurah Salaam (2008)
- Umut (1970)

=== Un ===
- Un'altra vita (1992)
- Un'estate ai Caraibi (2009)
- Un'estate al mare (2008)

==== Una ====
- Una (2016)
- Unabomber: The True Story (1996)
- Unacceptable Levels (2013)
- Unaccompanied Minors (2006)
- Unaccustomed As We Are (1929)
- The Unafraid (1915)
- Unakkaagave Vaazhgiren (1986)
- Unakkaga Ellam Unakkaga (1999)
- Unakkaga En Kadhal (2010)
- Unakkaga Mattum (2000)
- Unakkaga Naan (1976)
- Unakkaga Piranthen (1992)
- Unakkenna Venum Sollu (2015)
- Unakkul Naan (2015)
- Unakkum Enakkum (2006)
- The Unamenables (1959)
- Unarchigal: (1976 & 2006)
- Unarmed Verses (2017)
- Unaroo (1984)
- Unarthupattu (1980)
- Unashamed (1932)
- Unauthorized series:
  - The Unauthorized Beverly Hills, 90210 Story (2015 TV)
  - The Unauthorized Full House Story (2015 TV)
  - The Unauthorized Melrose Place Story (2015 TV)
  - The Unauthorized Saved by the Bell Story (2014 TV)
- Unaware (2010)

==== Unb ====
- The Unbearable Being of Lightness (2016)
- The Unbearable Lightness of Being (1988)
- The Unbearable Lightness of Inspector Fan (2015)
- The Unbearable Salesman (1957)
- The Unbearable Weight of Massive Talent (2022)
- Unbeatable (2013)
- Unbeatable Harold (2006)
- Unbeaten 28 (1980)
- Unbecoming Age (1992)
- Unbelievable!!!!! (2016)
- Unbelievable Adventures of Italians in Russia (1974)
- The Unbelievable Truth (1989)
- The Unbeliever (1918)
- The Unbelievers (2013)
- The Unborn: (1991 & 2009)
- The Unborn 2 (1994)
- Unborn but Forgotten (2002)
- Unborn in the USA (2007)
- Unbowed (2011)
- Unbreakable (2000)
- Unbreakable Kimmy Schmidt: Kimmy vs the Reverend (2020)
- Unbridled (2017)
- Unbroken (2014)
- Unbroken: Path to Redemption (2018)
- Unbroken Glass (2016)
- The Unburied Man (2004)

==== Unc ====
- Uncanny (2015)
- The Uncanny (1977)
- The Uncanny House (1916)
- Uncanny Valley (2015)
- Uncensored (1942)
- Uncertain Glory: (1944 & 2017)
- Uncertain Lady (1934)
- An Uncertain Season (1988)
- Uncertainty (2008)
- The Uncertainty Has Settled (2017)
- The Uncertainty Principle (2002)
- Unchained (1955)
- Unchained Memories (2003)
- The Unchanging Sea (1910)
- Uncharted (2022)
- Uncharted Channels (1920)
- Uncharted Live Action Fan Film (2018)
- Uncharted Seas (1921)
- The Unchastened Woman: (1918 & 1925)
- UnCivil Liberties (2006)
- Uncivil War Birds (1946)
- Uncivil Warriors (1935)
- Uncivilised (1936)
- Unclaimed: (2013 & 2016)
- Unclaimed Goods (1918)
- Uncle (2018)
- The Uncle (1966)
- The Uncle from America (1953)
- Uncle Boonmee Who Can Recall His Past Lives (2010)
- Uncle Bräsig (1936)
- Uncle Brian (2010)
- Uncle Buck (1989)
- Uncle Bun (1991)
- Uncle David (2010)
- Uncle Dick's Darling (1920)
- Uncle Donald's Ants (1952)
- Uncle Drew (2018)
- Uncle Frank (2020)
- Uncle Frans (1926)
- Uncle Howard (2016)
- Uncle Hyacynth (1956)
- Uncle Jasper's Will (1922)
- Uncle Joe (1941)
- Uncle Joe Shannon (1978)
- Uncle John (2015)
- Uncle Josh at the Moving Picture Show (1902)
- Uncle Kent (2011)
- Uncle Marin, the Billionaire (1979)
- Uncle Martino (1960)
- Uncle Meat (1987)
- Uncle Nick (2015)
- Uncle Nino (2003)
- Uncle Peckerhead (2020)
- The Uncle from Peking (1934)
- The Uncle from the Provinces (1926)
- Uncle Sam (1996)
- Uncle Silas (1947)
- The Uncle from Sumatra (1930)
- Uncle Thomas: Accounting for the Days (2019)
- Uncle Tom's Bungalow (1937)
- Uncle Tom's Cabaña (1947)
- Uncle Tom's Cabin: (1903, 1910 Thanhouser, 1910 Vitagraph, 1914, 1918, 1927, 1965 & 1987)
- Uncle Tom's Fairy Tales (TBD)
- Uncle Tom's Uncle (1926)
- Uncle Vanya: (1957, 1963 & 1970)
- Uncle Was a Vampire (1959)
- The Uncles (2000)
- Uncle's Apartment (1913)
- Uncle's New Blazer (1915)
- Uncle's Paradise (2006)
- Unclenching the Fists (2021)
- Uncommon Friends of the 20th Century (1999)
- An Uncommon King (2011)
- Uncommon Valor (1983)
- Uncommon Women and Others (1978)
- The Uncondemned (2015)
- Unconditional (2012)
- Unconditional Love: (2002 & 2003 TV)
- Unconquered: (1917, 1947 & 1989 TV)
- The Unconquered (1956)
- Unconquered Bandit (1935)
- Unconquered Woman (1922)
- Unconstitutional: The War on Our Civil Liberties (2004)
- Unconvention: A Mix-Tape from St. Paul, RNC '08 (2009)
- Uncorked: (2009 & 2020)
- Uncovered (1994)
- Uncovered: The War on Iraq (2004)
- Uncross the Stars (2008)
- Uncut (1997)
- Uncut Gems (2019)

==== Und ====
- Und Jimmy ging zum Regenbogen (1971)
- Und wieder 48 (1948)
- Unda (2019)
- Undamma Bottu Pedata (1968)
- The Undead (1957)
- Undead (2003)
- Undead or Alive (2007)
- Undead Pool (2007)
- Undeclared War (1990)
- Undefeatable (1994)
- Undefeated: (2003 TV & 2011)
- The Undefeated: (1969, 2000 & 2011)
- Under Age: (1941 & 1964)
- Under Arizona Skies (1946)
- Under the Bed series:
  - Under the Bed (2012)
  - Under the Bed 2 (2014)
  - Under the Bed 3 (2016)
- Under the Big Top (1938)
- Under the Black Eagle (1928)
- Under Blazing Heavens (1936)
- Under the Boardwalk (1989)
- Under the Boardwalk: The Monopoly Story (2011)
- Under the Bombs (2007)
- Under the Bridges (1946)
- Under Burning Skies (1912)
- Under California Stars (1948)
- Under Capricorn (1949)
- Under the Cards (1948)
- Under the Cherry Moon (1986)
- Under the Chinese Restaurant (1987)
- Under the City (1953)
- Under a Cloud (1937)
- Under Colorado Skies (1947)
- Under the Constellation Gemini (1979)
- Under Construction (2015)
- Under the Counter Spy (1954)
- Under Cover: (1916 & 1987)
- Under Cover of Night (1937)
- Under-Cover Man (1932)
- Under the Crescent (1915)
- Under Crimson Skies (1920)
- Under the Doctor (1976)
- The Under Dog (1932)
- Under the Dome (2015)
- Under the Domim Tree (1994)
- Under the Dragon's Tail (2005)
- Under the Eiffel Tower (2018)
- Under Eighteen (1931)
- Under Electric Clouds (2015)
- Under the Electric Sky (2014)
- Under en steinhimmel (1974)
- Under False Colors (1917)
- Under False Flag: (1932 & 1935)
- Under Fiesta Stars (1941)
- Under Fire: (1926, 1957, 1983 & 2025)
- Under the Flag of the Rising Sun (1972)
- Under the Frozen Falls (1948)
- Under the Gaslight (1914)
- Under the Glacier (1989)
- Under Great White Northern Lights (2009)
- Under the Greenwood Tree: (1918 & 1929)
- Under the Gun: (1951 & 1995)
- Under the Hawthorn Tree (2010)
- Under Heaven (1998)
- Under Heavy Fire (2001)
- Under the Hula Moon (1995)
- Under Jakob's Ladder (2011)
- Under a Jarvis Moon (2010)
- Under the Lantern (1928)
- Under the Lash (1921)
- Under the Leather Helmet (1932)
- Under the Lighthouse Dancing (1997)
- Under Mexicali Stars (1950)
- Under Milk Wood: (1972 & 2015)
- Under the Mountain (2009)
- Under the Mountains (1920)
- Under the Mud (2009)
- Under My Nails (2012)
- Under My Skin (1950)
- Under Nevada Skies (1946)
- Under New Management (1946)
- Under One Roof (2002)
- Under One Sky (1982)
- Under Our Skin (2008)
- Under the Palms (1999)
- Under the Pampas Moon (1935)
- Under the Pavement Lies the Strand (1975)
- Under the Piano (1995)
- Under Pressure (1935)
- Under Proof (1936)
- Under the Radar (2004)
- Under the Rainbow: (1981 & 2013)
- Under the Raven's Wing (2007)
- Under the Red Robe: (1915, 1923 & 1937)
- Under the Red Sea (1952)
- Under the Roofs of Paris (1930)
- Under the Rouge (1925)
- Under the Salt (2008)
- Under the Same Moon (2008)
- Under the Same Roof (2019)
- Under the Same Skin (1962)
- Under the Same Sky (1964)
- Under the Sand (2000)
- Under the Seas (1907)
- Under Secret Orders (1937)
- Under a Shadow (1915)
- Under the Shadow (2016)
- Under the Shadow of the Law (1913)
- Under Siege (1992)
- Under Siege 2: Dark Territory (1995)
- Under the Sign of Scorpio (1969)
- Under the Silver Lake (2018)
- Under the Skies of the Asturias (1951)
- Under the Skin: (1997 & 2013)
- Under the Skin of the City (2001)
- Under the Sky of Paris (1951)
- Under the Sky of Spain (1953)
- Under the Southern Cross: (1927, 1929 & 1938)
- Under Southern Skies: (1902 & 1915)
- Under the Spell of Silence (1916)
- Under the Stars: (2001 & 2007)
- Under the Stars of Capri (1953)
- Under Strange Flags (1937)
- Under the Sun: (1998 & 2015)
- Under the Sun of Rome (1948)
- Under the Sun of Satan (1987)
- Under Suspicion: (1918, 1919, 1930, 1991 & 2000)
- Under Ten Flags (1960)
- Under a Texas Moon (1930)
- Under Texas Skies: (1930 & 1940)
- Under the Thousand Lanterns (1952)
- Under the Tonto Rim: (1928, 1933 & 1947)
- Under the Top (1919)
- Under the Tree: (2008 & 2017)
- Under the Tuscan Sun (2003)
- Under Two Flags: (1916, 1922 & 1936)
- Under Two Jags (1923)
- Under the Volcano: (1984 & 2021)
- Under Western Eyes: (1936 & 1996)
- Under Western Skies: (1926 & 1945)
- Under Western Stars (1938)
- Under Wraps: (1997 TV & 2021 TV)
- Under the Yoke (1918)
- Under Your Hat (1940)
- Under Your Skin (1966)
- Under Your Spell (1936)
- Under the Yum Yum Tree (1963)
- The Underachievers (1987)
- Undercard (2026)
- Underclassman (2005)
- Undercover: (1943 American, 1943 British & 1983)
- Undercover Agent (1939)
- Undercover Angel (1999)
- Undercover Blues (1993)
- Undercover Brother (2002)
- Undercover Brother 2 (2019)
- Undercover Christmas (2003)
- Undercover Doctor (1939)
- Undercover Duet (2015)
- Undercover Girl (1950)
- Undercover Grandpa (2017)
- Undercover Kitty (2001)
- Undercover with the KKK (1979)
- Undercover Maisie (1947)
- Undercover Man: (1936 & 1942)
- Undercover Men (1934)
- The Undercover Woman (1946)
- Undercover X (2001)
- Undercurrent: (1946 & 2010)
- The Undercurrent (1919)
- Undercut (2004)
- Underdog (2007 & 2018)
- Underdog Kids (2015)
- Underdogs: (2013 American & 2013 Argentine)
- Underexposure (2005)
- Underfunded (2006)
- Underground: (1928, 1941, 1970, 1976, 1995 & 2020)
- Underground Aces (1981)
- The Underground Comedy Movie (1999)
- The Underground Eiger (1979 TV)
- Underground Lizard People (2011)
- The Underground Man (1981)
- Underground Rustlers (1941)
- Underground Secrets (1991)
- Underground U.S.A. (1980)
- The Underground World (1943)
- Underground: The Julian Assange Story (2012)
- Undermind (2003)
- The Underneath (1995)
- Underneath the Arches (1937)
- Undersea Kingdom (1936)
- Undersea Super Train: Marine Express (1979)
- The Understudy: (1976 & 2008)
- The Understudy: Graveyard Shift II (1988)
- The Undertaker: (1932 & 1988)
- The Undertow: (1915 & 1916)
- Undertow: (1930, 1949, 1996, 2004 & 2009)
- Undertow Eyes (2009)
- Undertrial (2007)
- Underwater (2020)
- Underwater! (1955)
- Underwater Dreams (2014)
- Underwater Love (2011)
- Underwater Warrior (1958)
- Underworld: (1927, 1937, 1985, 1996 & 2004)
- Underworld series:
  - Underworld (2003)
  - Underworld: Evolution (2006)
  - Underworld: Rise of the Lycans (2009)
  - Underworld: Endless War (2011)
  - Underworld: Awakening (2012)
  - Underworld: Blood Wars (2017)
- The Underworld (2018)
- Underworld Beauty (1958)
- The Underworld Story (1950)
- Underworld U.S.A. (1961)
- Undine: (1916 & 2020)
- Undiscovered (2005)
- Undisputed series:
  - Undisputed (2002)
  - Undisputed II: Last Man Standing (2006)
  - Undisputed III: Redemption (2010)
- Undocumented (2010)
- Undoing (2006)
- Undrafted (2016)
- Undressed (1928)
- Undressing Extraordinary (1901)
- Undressing Israel: Gay Men in the Promised Land (2012)
- Undu Hoda Kondu Hoda (1992)
- The Undying (2011)
- The Undying Monster (1942)

==== Une ====
- Une Affaire de nègres (2006)
- Une blonde comme ça (1962)
- Une chance sur deux (1998)
- Une époque formidable... (1991)
- Une famille à louer (2015)
- Une femme coquette (1955)
- Une Femme ou Deux (1985)
- Une Fenêtre ouverte (2005)
- Une fille et des fusils (1965)
- Une histoire banale (2014)
- Une idylle à la ferme (1912)
- Une liaison pornographique (1999)
- Une nuit à l'Assemblée Nationale (1988)
- Une nuit agitée (1912)
- Une ravissante idiote (1964)
- Une sale histoire (1977)
- Une si jolie petite plage (1949)
- Une souris chez les hommes (1963)
- Une vie meilleure (2011)
- Une Visite (1950s)
- Unearth (2020)
- Unearthed (2006)
- Unearthed and Understood (2014)
- Unearthed & Untold: The Path to Pet Sematary (2017)
- The Unearthing (2015)
- The Unearthly (1957)
- Unearthly Stranger (1963)
- Uneasy Money: (1918 & 1926)
- Uneasy Terms (1948)
- Uneasy Virtue (1931)
- Uneven Fairways (2009)
- An Uneventful Story (1986)
- Unexpected: (2005 & 2015)
- Unexpected Christmas (2025)
- Unexpected Conflict (1948)
- Unexpected Father (1939)
- The Unexpected Father (1932)
- Unexpected Guest (1947)
- Unexpected Love (2014)
- Unexpected Places: (1918 & 2012)
- Unexpected Race (2018)
- Unexpected Riches (1942)
- Unexpected Uncle (1941)
- Unexpectedly Yours (2017)

==== Unf ====
- Unfair trilogy:
  - Unfair: The Movie (2007)
  - Unfair 2: The Answer (2011)
  - Unfair: The End (2015)
- Unfair Competition (2001)
- Unfair Dealing (2008)
- Unfair & Lovely (TBD)
- Unfair World (2011)
- The Unfair Sex (1926)
- Unfaithful: (1931 & 2002)
- The Unfaithful: (1947 & 1953)
- The Unfaithful Eckehart: (1931 & 1940)
- Unfaithful Mornings (1989)
- The Unfaithful Wife (1969)
- Unfaithfully Yours: (1948 & 1984)
- The Unfaithfuls (1953)
- Unfiltered Breathed In (2015)
- Unfinished (2018)
- An Unfinished Affair (1996 TV)
- Unfinished Business: (1941, 1977, 1984, 1985 Australian, 1985 American, 2009 & 2015)
- The Unfinished Comedy (1957)
- The Unfinished Conversation (2013)
- The Unfinished Dance (1947)
- An Unfinished Life (2005)
- An Unfinished Piece for Mechanical Piano (1977)
- Unfinished Sky (2007)
- Unfinished Spaces (2011)
- Unfinished Story (1955)
- Unfinished Supper (1979)
- Unfinished Symphony (1934)
- Unfinished Symphony: Democracy and Dissent (2001)
- The Unfish (1997)
- The Unfolding (2016)
- Unfolding Florence: The Many Lives of Florence Broadhurst (2006)
- Unforgettable: (1996, 2014, 2016, & 2017)
- Unforgettable Blast (2015)
- The Unforgettable Character (1975)
- The Unforgettable Director of Love Movies (1990)
- Unforgettable Life (1988)
- An Unforgettable Summer (1994)
- Unforgettable Trail (1959)
- The Unforgettable Year 1919 (1951)
- Unforgivable: (1996 TV & 2011)
- The Unforgivable (2021)
- Unforgivable Blackness: The Rise and Fall of Jack Johnson (2005)
- Unforgiven: (1992, 2013 & 2018)
- The Unforgiven: (1960 & 2005)
- The Unforeseen (1917)
- The Unfortunate Car (2012)
- The Unfortunate Policeman (1905)
- Unfreedom (2014)
- Unfriend (2014)
- Unfriended (2014)
- Unfriended: Dark Web (2018)
- The Unfrocked One (1954)

==== Ung–Unh ====
- Ungarala Rambabu (2017)
- Ungeküsst soll man nicht schlafen gehn (1936)
- An Ungentlemanly Act (1992 TV)
- Unglassed Windows Cast a Terrible Reflection (1953)
- Ungli (2014)
- The Ungrateful Heart (1951)
- Ungu Violet (2005)
- The Unguarded Hour: (1925 & 1936)
- The Unguarded Moment (1956)
- Unguarded Women (1924)
- Unhallowed Ground (2015)
- The Unhanged (1971)
- Unheimliche Geschichten: (1919 & 1932)
- Unhinged: (1982 & 2020)
- Unholy (2007)
- The Unholy: (1988 & 2021)
- Unholy Desire (1964)
- The Unholy Garden (1931)
- Unholy Love (1932)
- The Unholy Night (1929)
- Unholy Partners (1941)
- Unholy Rollers (1972)
- The Unholy Three: (1925 & 1930)
- The Unholy Trinity (2024)
- The Unholy Wife (1957)
- Unholy Women (2006)
- Unhook the Stars (1996)
- UnHung Hero (2013)

==== Uni ====
- The Unicorn: (1978 & 2018)
- Unicorn Store (2017)
- Unicorn Wars (2022)
- Unidentified: (2006 & 2020)
- Unidentified Flying Oddball (1979)
- Uniform (2003)
- UnIndian (2015)
- Uninhabited (2010)
- The Uninhibited (1965)
- The Unintentional Kidnapping of Mrs. Elfriede Ott (2010)
- Uninvited: (1987 & 1999)
- The Uninvited: (1944, 1996 TV, 2003, 2008, 2009 & 2024)
- Uninvited Guest (1999)
- The Uninvited Guest: (1923, 1924, 1925 & 2004)
- The Union (2011)
- The Union: The Business Behind Getting High (2007)
- Union Depot (1932)
- Union Leader (2017)
- Union Maids (1976)
- Union Pacific (1939)
- Union of Salvation (2019)
- Union Square (2011)
- Union Station (1950)
- A Union in Wait (2001)
- Unique Brothers (2014)
- A Unique Spring (1957)
- Unit 234 (2024)
- United: (2003 & 2011)
- The United (TBD)
- United 300 (2007)
- United 93 (2006)
- United in Anger: A History of ACT UP (2012)
- A United Kingdom (2016)
- United Passions (2014)
- United Red Army (2007)
- United Six (2011)
- United Skates (2018)
- The United States of America (1975)
- The United States of Leland (2004)
- United States of Love (2016)
- United States Marine Band (1942)
- United States Smith (1928)
- United We Stand (2003)
- Unity (2015)
- The Universal Language (2011)
- Universal Signs (2008)
- Universal Soldier (1971)
- Universal Soldier series:
  - Universal Soldier (1992)
  - Universal Soldier II: Brothers in Arms (1998)
  - Universal Soldier III: Unfinished Business (1998)
  - Universal Soldier: The Return (1999)
  - Universal Soldier: Regeneration (2010)
  - Universal Soldier: Day of Reckoning (2012)
- Universal Soldiers (2007)
- Universe: (1960 & 1976)
- University (2002)
- University Heights (2004)

==== Unj–Unk ====
- The Unjust (2010)
- The Unjust Angel (1954)
- Unjustified Absence (1939)
- The Unkabogable Praybeyt Benjamin (2011)
- The Unkindness of Ravens (2016)
- The Unkissed Bride (1966)
- Unknown: (2006 & 2011)
- The Unknown: (1913, 1915 comedy, 1915 drama, 1927, 1936, & 1946)
- Unknown Brood (2016)
- The Unknown Cavalier (1926)
- Unknown Chaplin (1983 TV)
- The Unknown Dancer (1929)
- The Unknown Girl (2016)
- The Unknown Guest (1943)
- Unknown Island (1948)
- The Unknown Known (2013)
- The Unknown Lover (1925)
- The Unknown Man (1951)
- Unknown Man of San Marino (1946)
- The Unknown Man of Shandigor (1967)
- The Unknown Mariachi (1953)
- Unknown of Monte Carlo (1939)
- The Unknown Ocean (1964)
- Unknown Path (1946)
- Unknown Pleasures (2002)
- The Unknown Policeman (1941)
- The Unknown Purple (1923)
- The Unknown Quantity (1919)
- The Unknown Ranger (1936)
- Unknown Sender (1950)
- The Unknown Singer (1947)
- The Unknown Soldier: (1926, 1955, 1985 & 2017)
- The Unknown Terror (1957)
- The Unknown Tomorrow (1923)
- Unknown Treasures (1926)
- Unknown White Male (2005)
- The Unknown Woman (2006)
- Unknown World (1951)
- The Unknown World (2012)

==== Unl ====
- Unlawful Entry (1992)
- Unlawful Killing (2011)
- The Unlawful Trade (1914)
- Unleashed: (2005 & 2016)
- Unless (2016)
- Unless the Water Is Safer than the Land (2018)
- Unlikely Angel (1996)
- Unlikely Revolutionaries (2010)
- Unlisted Owner (2017)
- Unlocked: (2006 & 2017)
- Unlocking the Cage (2016)
- Unlocking the Mystery of Life (2003)
- Unlovable (2018)
- Unloved (2001)
- The Unloved (2009)
- The Unloved Woman: (1914, 1940 & 1949)
- Unlucky Plaza (2014)

==== Unm ====
- Unmade Beds: (1997 & 2009)
- Unmaiye Un Vilai Enna? (1976)
- Unman, Wittering and Zigo (1971)
- Unmanned: America's Drone Wars (2013)
- Unmarried: (1920 & 1939)
- Unmarried Daughters (1926)
- Unmarried Mothers (1976)
- An Unmarried Woman (1978)
- The Unmarried Woman (1917)
- The Unmarried Wife (2016)
- Unmasked: (1917 & 1950)
- Unmasked Part 25 (1988)
- The Unmasking (1914)
- Unmatched (2010)
- The Unmentionables (1963)
- Unmistaken Child (2008)

==== Unn–Uno ====
- Unna Nenachen Pattu Padichen (1992)
- Unna ja Nuuk (2006)
- Unnai Charanadaindhen (2003)
- Unnai Kann Theduthe (2009)
- Unnai Kann Theduthey (2000)
- Unnai Kodu Ennai Tharuven (2000)
- Unnai Naan Santhithen (1984)
- Unnai Ninaithu (2002)
- Unnai Solli Kutramillai (1990)
- Unnai Suttrum Ulagam (1977)
- Unnai Thedi (1999)
- Unnai Thedi Varuven (1985)
- Unnai Vaazhthi Paadugiren (1992)
- Unnaipol Oruvan: (1965 & 2009)
- Unnal Mudiyum Thambi (1988)
- Unnale Unnale (2007)
- Unnam (2012)
- The Unnamable (1988)
- The Unnamable II: The Statement of Randolph Carter (1993)
- The Unnamed (2016)
- The Unnamed Zone (2006)
- Unnaruge Naan Irundhal (1999)
- Unnathangalil (2001)
- Unnatural & Accidental (2006)
- Unnatural History (1959)
- The Unnaturals (1969)
- Unnecessary Fuss (1984)
- The Unnecessary Sex (1915)
- Unni: (1989 & 2007)
- Unni Vanna Divasam (1984)
- Unnidathil Ennai Koduthen (1998)
- Unnikale Oru Kadha Parayam (1987)
- Unnikrishnante Adyathe Christmas (1988)
- Unnikuttanu Joli Kitti (1989)
- Unnimaya (2000)
- Unnodu Ka (2016)
- Unnudan (1999)
- Uno (2004)
- Uno contro l'altro, praticamente amici (1981)
- Uno di più all'inferno (1968)
- Uno y medio contra el mundo (1973)
- Unofficially Yours (2012)
- Unoponchash Batash (2020)
- Unos Pocos con Valor (2010)

==== Unp–Unr ====
- The Unpainted Woman (1919)
- The Unpardonable Sin (1919)
- Unpaused (2020)
- Unplanned (2019)
- Unplugging (2022)
- Unprecedented: The 2000 Presidential Election (2002)
- The Unprecedented Defence of the Fortress Deutschkreuz (1966)
- Unpregnant (2020)
- Unprotected (1916)
- Unpublished Story (1942)
- Unquiet Graves (2018)
- Unraveled (2011)
- An Unreasonable Man (2006)
- Unrelated (2007)
- Unrest: (2006 & 2017)
- Unrestrained Youth (1925)
- The Unreturned (2010)
- Unripe Fruit (1934)
- Unrivaled (2010)
- Unrivaled: Earnhardt vs. Gordon (2019)
- Unruled Paper (2002)
- The Unruly Hare (1945)

==== Uns ====
- Les Uns et les Autres (1981)
- The Unsaid (2001)
- Unsalted: A Great Lakes Experience (2005)
- Unsane (2018)
- The Unsaved (2013)
- The Unscarred (2000)
- The Unscrupulous Ones (1962)
- The Unseeable (2006)
- Unseeing Eyes (1923)
- Unseen (2023)
- The Unseen: (1945, 1980 & 2016)
- Unseen Enemy (1942)
- An Unseen Enemy (1912)
- Unseen Evil (2001)
- Unseen Forces (1920)
- Unseen Hands (1924)
- The Unseen Vengeance (1914)
- Unseen Wonder (1984)
- Unser täglich Brot (1949)
- Unsettled (2007)
- Unsettled Land (1987)
- The Unshrinkable Jerry Mouse (1964)
- The Unsinkable Molly Brown (1964)
- Unspeakable: (2000 & 2002)
- The Unspeakable (1924)
- The Unspeakable Act (2012)
- Unspoken (2008)
- Unstoppable: (2004, 2010, 2013 & 2018)
- Unstoppable: Conversation with Melvin Van Peebles, Gordon Parks, and Ossie Davis (2005)
- The Unstoppable Man (1960)
- Unstoppable Marriage (2007)
- Unstrung Heroes (1995)
- Unsubscribe (2020)
- An Unsuitable Job for a Woman (1982)
- Unsullied (2014)
- Unsung Hero (2024)
- The Unsuspected (1947)
- The Unsuspecting Angel (1936)

==== Unt ====
- Untamable Angelique (1967)
- The Untamable Whiskers (1904)
- Untamagiru (1989)
- Untamed: (1929, 1940, 1955 & 1957)
- The Untamed: (1920 & 2016)
- The Untamed Breed (1948)
- Untamed Frontier (1952)
- Untamed Fury (1947)
- Untamed Heart (1993)
- Untamed Heiress (1954)
- The Untamed Lady (1926)
- Untamed Romania (2018)
- Untamed Women (1952)
- Untamed Youth: (1924 & 1957)
- Unter dem Rauschen deiner Wimpern (1951)
- Unterm Radar (2015)
- Unternehmen Michael (1937)
- Unterwerfung (2018)
- Unthinkable (2010)
- The Unthinkable: (1926 & 2018)
- Until the Birds Return (2017)
- Until the Day We Meet Again (1932)
- Until Dawn (2025)
- Until Death: (1988 & 2007)
- Until the End of Time (2017)
- Until the End of the World (1991)
- Until Forever (2016)
- Until the Light Takes Us (2008)
- Until Midnight (2018)
- Until Money Departs You (1960)
- Until Next Spring (1960)
- Until the Night (2004)
- Until Nothing Remains (2010)
- Until September (1984)
- Until They Sail (1957)
- Until We Meet Again: (1950 & 1952)
- Untitled (2011)
- (Untitled) (2009)
- Untitled Home Invasion Romance (2026)
- Unto the Dusk (2014)
- Unto the Third Generation (1913)
- Unto Those Who Sin (1916)
- Unto the Weak (1914)
- The Untitled Kartik Krishnan Project (2010)
- Untogether (2018)
- The Untold (2003)
- Untold Scandal (2003)
- The Untold Story (1993)
- The Untold Story 2 (1998)
- The Untold Tale of the Three Kingdoms (2020)
- Untouchable (2019)
- Untouchable Lawman (2015)
- The Untouchables (1987)
- Untouched (1954)
- The Untouched Woman (1925)
- Untraceable (2008)
- Untuk Angeline (2016)
- Untypical Story (1977)

==== Unu–Unz ====
- Unusable (1917)
- Unusual Exhibition (1968)
- An Unusual Summer (1957)
- The Unusual Past of Thea Carter (1929)
- The Unusual Youth (2005)
- The Unvanquished (1964)
- Unvanquished City (1950)
- The Unveiling Hand (1919)
- Unwanted (2017)
- The Unwanted: (1924, 1951 & 2014)
- Unwanted Cinema (2005)
- The Unwanted Girl (1953)
- Unwanted Soldiers (1999)
- Unwed Mother (1958)
- The Unwelcome Guest (1913)
- The Unwelcome Mrs. Hatch (1914)
- The Unwelcome Stranger (1935)
- An Unwilling Hero (1921)
- The Unwritten Code: (1919 & 1944)
- The Unwritten Law: (1907, 1922, 1925, 1929, 1932 & 1985)
- Unzipped (1995)

=== Uo ===
- Uomini ombra (1954)
- Un uomo a metà (1966)
- Un uomo ritorna (1946)

=== Up ===
- Up: (1984 & 2009)
- Up the Academy (1980)
- Up Against It (1912)
- Up in the Air: (1940 & 2009)
- Up in Arms (1944)
- Up from the Beach (1965)
- Up in the Cellar (1970)
- Up in Central Park (1948)
- Up to a Certain Point (1983)
- Up the Chastity Belt (1971)
- Up Close & Personal (1996)
- Up the Creek: (1958 & 1984)
- Up for the Cup: (1931 & 1950)
- Up in Daisy's Penthouse (1953)
- Up Denali 3D (2003)
- Up from the Depths (1979)
- Up for the Derby (1933)
- Up and Down: (1965 & 2004)
- Up the Down Staircase (1967)
- Up and at 'Em (1922)
- Up the Establishment (1969)
- Up in Flames (1973)
- Up Front (1951)
- Up the Front (1972)
- Up Goes Maisie (1946)
- Up for Grabs (2004)
- Up to His Ears (1965)
- Up to His Neck (1954)
- Up Jumped the Devil (1941)
- Up Jumped a Swagman (1965)
- Up the Junction (1968)
- Up the Ladder (1925)
- Up with the Lark (1943)
- Up for Love (2016)
- Up in Mabel's Room: (1926 & 1944)
- Up the MacGregors! (1967)
- Up for Murder (1931)
- Up to the Neck (1933)
- Up North (2018)
- Up to Our Necks (2004)
- Up Periscope (1959)
- Up Pompeii (1971)
- Up Pops the Devil (1931)
- Up Pops the Duke (1931)
- Up from the Ranks (1943)
- Up the Ridge (2006)
- Up for the Rising Sun (1997)
- Up the River: (1930 & 1938)
- Up the Road with Sallie (1918)
- Up Romance Road (1918)
- Up the Sandbox (1972)
- Up in Smoke: (1957 & 1978)
- The Up-Standing Sitter (1948)
- Up Syndrome (2001)
- Up There (2011)
- An Up-to-Date Conjuror (1899)
- Up a Tree: (1930 & 1955)
- Up 'n' Under (1998)
- Up at the Villa (2000)
- Up in the Wind (2013)
- Up in the World (1956)
- Up the Yangtze (2007)
- Up Your Alley (1989)
- Up Your Legs Forever (1971)
- Up, Down, Fragile (1995)
- Up, Up and Away (2000 TV)
- Up! (1976)

==== Upa–Upp ====
- Upa en apuros (1942)
- Upaasna (1971)
- Upacharapoorvam Gunda Jayan (2022)
- Upaharam (1985)
- Upasane (1974)
- Upbeat in Music (1943)
- Upendra (1999)
- Upendra Matte Baa (2017)
- Upgrade (2018)
- Upgraded (2024)
- Uphaar (1971)
- Uphill All the Way (1986)
- The Uphill Path (1918)
- Upin & Ipin: Jeng Jeng Jeng! (2016)
- Upin & Ipin: Keris Siamang Tunggal (2019)
- Upír z Feratu (1982)
- Upkar (1967)
- The Upland Rider (1928)
- The Uplifters (1919)
- Upon the Magic Roads (2021)
- Upon the Shadow (2017)
- Uppalawanna (2007)
- Uppena (2021)
- The Upper Footage (2013)
- The Upper Hand (1966)
- Upper World (1934)
- Upperdog (2009)
- Uppi 2 (2015)
- Uppi Dada M.B.B.S. (2006)
- Uppi Rupee (TBD)
- Uppina Kagada (2017)
- Uppu (1987)
- Uppu Huli Khara (2017)
- Uppu Karuvaadu (2015)
- Uppukandam Brothers (1993)
- Uppukandam Brothers: Back in Action (2011)

==== Upr–Upt ====
- Upright Magic (1975)
- Uprising: (2001 & 2012)
- The Uprising: (1912 & 2026)
- Uproar in Damascus (1939)
- Uproar in the Studio (1926)
- Ups and Downs: (1915, 1937 & 1983)
- The Ups and Downs (1914)
- The Ups and Downs of a Handyman (1976)
- Ups 'n Downs (1931)
- The Upsetter (2008)
- Upside (2010)
- The Upside (2019)
- The Upside of Anger (2005)
- Upside Down: (1919, 2012 & 2015)
- Upside Down: The Creation Records Story (2010)
- Upside Down; or, the Human Flies (1899)
- Upside-Down Magic (2020)
- The Upside-down Triangle (2016)
- Upstage (1926)
- Upstairs (1919)
- Upstairs and Down (1919)
- Upstairs and Downstairs: (1925 & 1959)
- Upstarts (2017)
- Upstream (1927)
- Upstream Color (2013)
- Upswept Hare (1952)
- The Upthrown Stone (1969)
- Uptight (1968)
- Uptown: (1987 & 2009)
- Uptown Girls (2003)
- Uptown New York (1932)
- Uptown Saturday Night (1974)
- The Upturned Glass (1947)

=== Ur ===
- Urakkam Varaatha Raathrikal (1978)
- The Ural Front (1944)
- Uran Khatola (1955)
- Urangatha Ninaivugal (1983)
- Urangatha Sundary (1969)
- Uranium Boom (1956)
- The Uranium Conspiracy (1978)
- Uranus (1990)
- Urashima Tarō (1918)
- Uravadum Nenjam (1976)
- Uravai Kaatha Kili (1984)
- Uravukku Kai Koduppom (1975)
- Urban Cowboy (1980)
- Urban Decay (2007)
- Urban Explorer (2011)
- Urban Explorers: Into the Darkness (2007)
- Urban Feel (1998)
- Urban Games (2014)
- Urban Ghost Story (1998)
- Urban Hymn (2015)
- Urban Justice (2007)
- Urban Legend series:
  - Urban Legend (1998)
  - Urban Legends: Final Cut (2000)
  - Urban Legends: Bloody Mary (2005)
- Urban Menace (1999)
- Urban Myths (2022)
- Urban Safari (1996)
- Urban Terrorist (1998)
- Urbania (2000)
- Urbanized (2011)
- Urchagam (2007)
- Urchin (2007)
- Urduja (2008)
- Ureinung (2013)
- Ureme series:
  - Ureme 1 (1986)
  - Ureme 2 (1986)
  - Ureme 3 (1987)
  - Ureme 4 (1987)
  - Ureme 5 (1988)
  - Ureme 6 (1989)
  - Ureme 7 (1992)
- Ureshi Hazukashi Monogatari (1988)
- The Urethra Chronicles (1999)
- The Urethra Chronicles II: Harder, Faster Faster, Harder (2002)
- Urge (2016)
- Urge to Build (1981)
- Urge to Kill (1960)
- Urgent (2018)
- Urgh! A Music War (1982)
- Uri: The Surgical Strike (2019)
- Urimai (1985)
- Urimai Geetham (1988)
- Urimai Oonjaladugiradhu (1992)
- Urimai Por (1998)
- Urimaikural (1974)
- Uriyadi: (2016 & 2020)
- Uriyadi 2 (2019)
- Urlaub auf Ehrenwort: (1938 & 1955)
- Uro (2006)
- Ursula, the Girl from the Finnish Forests (1953)
- Ursus (1961)
- Ursus in the Land of Fire (1963)
- Ursus and the Tartar Princess (1961)
- Ursus in the Valley of the Lions (1962)
- Uru (2017)
- Urubu (1948)
- Urudhi Mozhi (1990)
- Urukku Manushyan (1986)
- Urumattram (2003)
- Urumbukal Urangarilla (2015)
- Urumeen (2015)
- Urumi (2011)
- Urusei Yatsura series:
  - Urusei Yatsura: Only You (1983)
  - Urusei Yatsura 2: Beautiful Dreamer (1984)
  - Urusei Yatsura 3: Remember Me (1985)
  - Urusei Yatsura 4: Lum the Forever (1986)
  - Urusei Yatsura: The Final Chapter (1988)
  - Urusei Yatsura: Always My Darling (1991)
- Uruvam (1991)
- Uruvangal Maralam (1983)
- Urvashi Bharathi (1973)
- Urvashi Kalyana (1993)
- Urvi (2017)

=== Us ===
- Us: (1991 TV & 2019)
- Us Again (2021)
- Us Kids (2020)
- Us Now (2009)
- Us and Our Education (2009)
- Us, Our Pets and the War (2024)
- Us Paar (1974)
- Us and Them (2018)
- Us in the U.S. (2013)

==== Usa–Usu ====
- Usaviya Nihandai (2015)
- Use Once and Destroy (1995)
- Used Cars (1980)
- Used People (1992)
- A Useful Life (2010)
- Useless (2007)
- Useless Humans (2020)
- The Users (1978 TV)
- Usfahrt Oerlike (2015)
- Usha Haran (1940)
- Usha Kalyanam (1936)
- Usha Parinayam: (1961 & 2024)
- Usher (2004)
- Ushpizin (2004)
- Usire (2001)
- Uski Roti (1969)
- Uśmiech zębiczny (1957)
- Usne Kaha Tha (1960)
- Uss Paar (1944)
- Ustaad (1999)
- Ustad Hotel (2012)
- Ustadi Ustad Se (1982)
- Ustadon Ke Ustad: (1963 & 1998)
- Ustedes los ricos (1948)
- The Usual Suspects (1995)

=== Ut ===
- Ut av mørket (1958)
- Utah (1945)
- Utah Blaine (1957)
- The Utah Kid: (1930 & 1944)
- The Utah Trail (1938)
- Utah Wagon Train (1951)
- Utamaro and His Five Women (1946)
- Utatama (2008)
- Uthama Purushan (1989)
- Uthama Puthiran: (1940 & 1958)
- Uthama Raasa (1993)
- Uthaman: (1976 & 2001)
- Uthamaputhiran (2010)
- Uthami (1985)
- Uthami Petra Rathinam (1960)
- Utharam (1989)
- Utharaswayamvaram (2009)
- Uthiripookkal (1979)
- Uthrada Rathri (1978)
- Uththara (2010)
- Utilities (1983)
- Utkarsha (1990)
- Utopia: (1983, 2013 & 2015)
- The Utopian Society (2003)
- Utopians (2015)
- Utopiayile Rajavu (2015)
- Utøya: July 22 (2018)
- Utrpení mladého Boháčka (1969)
- Utsab (2000)
- Utsav (1984)
- Utsavam (1975)
- Utsavamelam (1992)
- Utshimassits: Place of the Boss (1996)
- Utt Pataang (2011)
- Uttar Dakshin (1987)
- Uttar Falguni (1963)
- Uttar Purush (1966)
- Uttara (2000)
- Utu (1983)
- Utz (1992)

=== Uu–Uz ===
- Uu Kodathara? Ulikki Padathara? (2012)
- Uuno Epsanjassa (1985)
- Uuno Turhapuro series:
  - Uuno Turhapuro (1973)
  - Professori Uuno D.G. Turhapuro (1975)
  - Lottovoittaja UKK Turhapuro (1976)
  - Uuno Turhapuron aviokriisi (1981)
  - Uuno Turhapuro menettää muistinsa (1982)
  - Uuno Turhapuro armeijan leivissä (1984)
  - Uuno Epsanjassa (1985)
  - Uuno Turhapuro muuttaa maalle (1986)
  - Uuno Turhapuro – kaksoisagentti (1987)
  - Uuno Turhapuro – Suomen tasavallan herra presidentti (1992)
  - Uuno Turhapuro – This Is My Life (2004)
- Uvaa (2015)
- Uvanga (2013)
- Uvvu (1982)
- Uwantme2killhim? (2013)
- Uwiedziona (1931)
- Uyarangalil (1984)
- Uyare (2019)
- Uyarndha Manithan (1968)
- Uyarndha Ullam (1985)
- Uyarndhavargal (1977)
- Uyarthiru 420 (2011)
- Uyarum Njan Nadake (1985)
- Uyir (2006)
- Uyir Mel Aasai (1967)
- Uyira Maanama (1968)
- Uyire Unakkaga (1986)
- Uyire Uyire (2016)
- Uyirile Kalanthathu (2000)
- Uyirin Yedai 21 Ayiri (2011)
- Uyirodu Uyiraga (1998)
- Uyirthezhunnelppu (1985)
- Uyirullavarai Usha (1983)
- Uyun sahira (1934)
- Uyyala Jampala (2013)
- Uyyale (1969)
- Uzak (2002)
- Uzhaikkum Karangal (1976)
- Uzhaippali (1993)
- Uzhaithu Vaazha Vendum (1988)
- Uzhavan (1993)
- Uzhavan Magan (1987)
- Uzhavukkum Thozhilukkum Vandhanai Seivom (1959)
- Uzhiyan (1994)
- Uzumaki (2000)

== V ==
- V: (2020 & 2021)
- V pokušení (1939)
- V for Vendetta (2005)
- V for Visa (2013)
- V2: Dead Angel (2007)
- V13 (2025)
- V Day (2021)
- V-Day: Until the Violence Stops (2003)
- VDF Thasana (2014)
- VFW (2019)
- V/H/S series:
  - V/H/S (2012)
  - V/H/S/2 (2013)
  - V/H/S: Viral (2014)
  - V/H/S/94 (2021)
  - V/H/S/99 (2022)
  - V/H/S/85 (2023)
  - V/H/S/Beyond (2024)
  - V/H/S/Halloween (2025)
- V.I.P. (2017)
- VIPs (2010)
- The V.I.P.s (1963)
- V. I. P. (1997)
- V.I. Warshawski (1991)

=== Va ===
- Va (2010)
- Va a ser que nadie es perfecto (2006)
- Va banque (1920)
- Va savoir (2001)

==== Vaa ====
- Vaa Arugil Vaa (1991)
- Vaa Kanna Vaa (1982)
- Vaa Magale Vaa (1994)
- Vaa Raja Vaa (1969)
- Vaachalam (1997)
- Vaada: (2005 & 2010)
- Vaada Poda Nanbargal (2011)
- Vaada Raha (2009)
- Vaadaa (2010)
- Vaadai Kaatru (1978)
- Vaadaka Gunda (1989)
- Vaadamalli (2011)
- Vaade Iraade (1994)
- Vaade Veedu (1973)
- Vaadhyar (2012)
- Vaagai Sooda Vaa (2011)
- Vaah! Life Ho Toh Aisi! (2005)
- Vaai Kozhuppu (1989)
- Vaaimai (2016)
- Vaaitha (2022)
- Vaajlaach Paahije - Game Ki Shinema (2015)
- Vaaleduthaven Vaalaal (1979)
- Vaalee: (1999 & 2001)
- Vaaliba Raja (2016)
- Vaalmiki (2009)
- Vaaloabi Engeynama (2006)
- Vaalu (2015)
- Vaamanan (2009)
- Vaana (2008)
- Vaanam (2011)
- Vaanam Kottattum (2020)
- Vaanam Vasappadum (2004)
- Vaaname Ellai (1992)
- Vaanathaippola (2000)
- Vaanavil (2000)
- Vaanavil Vaazhkai (2015)
- Vaanchinathan (2001)
- Vaandu (2019)
- Vaanku (2021)
- Vaanmathi (1996)
- Vaapsi (2016)
- Vaanga Partner Vaanga (1994)
- Vaaraayo Vennilaave (2017)
- Vaaranam Aayiram (2008)
- Vaarasatwam (1964)
- Vaareva (2011)
- Vaarikkuzhiyile Kolapathakam (2019)
- Vaarikuzhi (1982)
- Vaashey Mashaa Ekee (2016)
- Vaashi: (1983 & 2022)
- Vaastav: The Reality (1999)
- Vaasthavam (2006)
- Vaastu Prakaara (2015)
- Vaastu Shastra (2004)
- Vaasu Naan Pakka Commercial (2018)
- Vaathiyaar Veettu Pillai (1989)
- Vaayai Moodi Pesavum (2014)
- Vaazha Vaitha Deivam (1959)
- Vaazhga Jananayagam (1996)
- Vaazhkai: (1949 & 1984)
- Vaazhkai Chakkaram (1990)
- Vaazhkai Oppandham 1959)
- Vaazhkai Padagu (1965)
- Vaazhl (2021)
- Vaazhnthu Kaattugiren (1975)
- Vaazhthugal (2008)
- Vaazhve Mayam (1970)

==== Vab–Vae ====
- Vabank (1981)
- Vacaciones de terror (1989)
- Vacancy (2007)
- Vacancy 2: The First Cut (2009)
- Vacancy in Vaughn Street (1963)
- The Vacancy (1981)
- Vacant Possession (1995)
- Una vacanza del cactus (1981)
- Vacanze a Ischia (1957)
- Vacanze di Natale (1983)
- Vacanze di Natale '90 (1990)
- Vacanze di Natale '91 (1991)
- Vacanze di Natale '95 (1995)
- Vacanze di Natale 2000 (1999)
- Vacanze di Natale a Cortina (2011)
- Vacanze in America (1984)
- Vacas (1992)
- Vacation: (2005 & 2015)
- Vacation Days (1947)
- Vacation with Derek (2010)
- Vacation Friends (2021)
- Vacation with a Gangster (1951)
- A Vacation in Hell (1979 TV)
- Vacation from Love (1938)
- Vacation from Marriage (1927)
- Vacation of Petrov and Vasechkin, Usual and Incredible (1984)
- Vacation in Reno (1946)
- Vacationland (2006)
- Vacations (1947)
- Vacations in Acapulco (1961)
- Vacations in Majorca (1959)
- Vacations in the Other World (1942)
- Vachan: (1938 & 1955)
- Vachanam (1990)
- Vachina Kodalu Nachindi (1959)
- Vacuuming Completely Nude in Paradise (2001 TV)
- Vada Chennai (2018)
- Vadacurry (2014)
- Vadagupatti Maapillai (2001)
- Vadaka Veedu (1979)
- Vadakakku Oru Hridayam (1978)
- Vadakkumnadhan (2006)
- Vadakkunokkiyantram (1989)
- Vaddante Dabbu (1954)
- Vaddu Bava Thappu (1994)
- Vader Episode I: Shards of the Past (2018)
- Vadhayiyaan Ji Vadhayiyaan (2018)
- Vadina (1955)
- Vadivukku Valai Kappu (1962)
- Vado a riprendermi il gatto (1987)
- Vaettiya Madichu Kattu (1998)

==== Vaf–Vaj ====
- Vafaatheri Kehiveriya (2016)
- Vagabond: (1950 & 1985)
- The Vagabond: (1916 & 1953)
- The Vagabond Cub (1929)
- The Vagabond King: (1930 & 1956)
- Vagabond Lady (1935)
- Vagabond Loafers (1949)
- The Vagabond Lover (1929)
- The Vagabond Prince (1916)
- The Vagabond Queen (1929)
- The Vagabond Trail (1924)
- Vagabonderne på Bakkegården (1958)
- The Vagabonds: (1912, 1916, 1937 & 1939)
- Vagdanam (1961)
- Vägen ut (1999)
- The Vagrant (1992)
- Vagrant Bus (1990)
- Vai avanti tu che mi vien da ridere (1982)
- Vai que Dá Certo (2013)
- Vai que É Mole (1960)
- Vai Pandal (1984)
- Vai Que Cola - O Filme (2015)
- Vai Raja Vai (2015)
- Vai Trabalhar, Vagabundo! (1973)
- Vaidehi Kalyanam (1991)
- Vaidehi Kathirunthal (1984)
- Vaigai (2009)
- Vaigai Express (2017)
- Vaigasi Poranthachu (1990)
- Vaiki Odunna Vandi (1987)
- Vaiki Vanna Vasantham (1980)
- Vaimaye Vellum (1997)
- Vaincre à Olympie (1977)
- Vaira (2017)
- Vaira Maalai (1954)
- Vaira Nenjam (1975)
- Vairagyam (1987)
- Vairam (1974)
- Vairam: Fight for Justice (2009)
- Vaisakhi List (2016)
- Vaisali (1988)
- Vaishakada Dinagalu (1993)
- Vaishnavee (2018)
- Vaitheeswaran (2008)
- Vajont (2001)
- Vajraghat (1992)
- Vajrakaya (2015)
- Vajram: (1995, 2004 & 2015)
- Vajrayudha (1992)

==== Vak ====
- Vakeel Saab (2021)
- Vakil Babu (1982)
- Vakil Saheb (1943)
- Vakinuvinama (2010)
- Vakkalathu Narayanankutty (2001)
- Vakkeel Vasudev (1993)
- Vakkuruthi (1973)
- Vakratunda Mahakaaya (2015)

==== Val ====
- Val (2021)
- Val Lewton: The Man in the Shadows (2007)
- Vala In London (2003)
- The Valachi Papers (1972)
- Valar Pirai (1962)
- Valarthumrugangal (1981)
- Valayal Satham (1987)
- Valayapathi (1952)
- Valdez Is Coming (1971)
- Valencia: (1926 & 1927)
- Valente Quintero (1973)
- Valentín (2002)
- Valentina: (1950 & 2008)
- Valentine (2001)
- The Valentine Girl (1917)
- Valentine Road (2013)
- Valentine's Day: (2007 & 2010)
- Valentino: (1951 & 1977)
- Valentino: The Last Emperor (2009)
- Valerian and the City of a Thousand Planets (2017)
- Valerie (1957)
- Valerie and Her Week of Wonders (1970)
- Valery Chkalov (1941)
- The Valet: (2006 & 2022)
- Valet Girls (1987)
- The Valet's Wife (1908)
- Valhalla: (1986, 2013 & 2019)
- Valhalla Rising (2009)
- Valiant (2005)
- The Valiant: (1929 & 1962)
- Valiant Hearts (2021)
- The Valiant Hombre (1948)
- Valiant Is the Word for Carrie (1936)
- The Valiant Navigator (1935)
- Valiant One (2025)
- The Valiant Ones (1975)
- Valiba Virundhu (1967)
- Valibamey Vaa Vaa (1982)
- Valimai (2022)
- Valiyangadi (2010)
- Valiyavan (2015)
- Valkannadi (2002)
- Valkyrie (2008)
- Valla Desam (2017)
- Vallakottai (2010)
- Vallal (1997)
- Vallamai Tharayo (2008)
- Vallarasu (2000)
- Vallatha Pahayan (2013)
- Vallavan (2006)
- Vallavan Oruvan (1966)
- Vallavanukku Pullum Aayudham (2014)
- Vallavanukku Vallavan (1965)
- Valleem Thetti Pulleem Thetti (2016)
- The Valley: (1972, 1976, 2014, & 2017)
- A Valley Divided (2009)
- Valley of Angels (2008)
- The Valley of the Bees (1968)
- The Valley Below (2014)
- Valley of Bones (2017)
- The Valley of Death (1968)
- The Valley of Decision (1945)
- Valley of Eagles (1951)
- The Valley of Fear (1916)
- Valley of Fire (1951)
- Valley Forge (1975)
- The Valley of Ghosts (1928)
- Valley Girl: (1983 & 2020)
- The Valley of Gwangi (1969)
- The Valley of Hell (1927)
- Valley of Hunted Men (1942)
- Valley of Love (2015)
- Valley of Peace (1956)
- The Valley Resounds (1950)
- Valley of Saints (2012)
- Valley of Shadows (2017)
- Valley of Shadows (2024)
- The Valley of Silent Men (1922)
- Valley of Song (1953)
- The Valley of Water (1962)
- The Valley of the Bees (1968)
- Valley of the Dolls (1967)
- Valley of the Dragons (1961)
- Valley of the Giants (1938)
- The Valley of the Giants: (1919 & 1927)
- Valley of the Head Hunters (1953)
- Valley of the Kings (1954)
- Valley of the Moon (1914)
- Valley of the Redwoods (1960)
- Valley of the Sasquatch (2015)
- Valley of the Stereos (1992)
- Valley of the Sun (1942)
- Valley of the Wolves series:
  - Valley of the Wolves: Iraq (2006)
  - Valley of the Wolves: Gladio (2009)
  - Valley of the Wolves: Palestine (2011)
- Valley of the Zombies (1946)
- Valli (1993)
- Valli Vara Pora (1995)
- Valliettan (2000)
- Vallinam (2014)
- Valliyin Selvan (1955)
- Valluvan Vasuki (2008)
- Valmiki: (1946, 1963 Kannada, 1963 Telugu, 2005)
- Valmont (1989)
- Valobasha Emoni Hoy (2017)
- Valparaíso mi amor (1969)
- Valu (2008)
- Valu Jada Tolu Beltu (1992)
- Value—Beyond Price (1910)
- The Value of Ignorance (1989)
- Value for Money (1955)
- Valzer (2007)

==== Vam ====
- Vamban (1987)
- Vambu Sandai (2008)
- Vámonos con Pancho Villa (1936)
- Vamp (1986)
- The Vamp (1918)
- Vampariah (2016)
- Vamping (1984)
- Vamping Venus (1928)
- Vampira: (1974 & 1994)
- Vampire: (1979 TV & 2011)
- The Vampire: (1913, 1915 & 1957)
- Vampire Academy (2014)
- Vampire Assassin (2005)
- The Vampire and the Ballerina (1960)
- The Vampire Bat (1933)
- Vampire Bats (2005)
- Vampire Blvd. (2004)
- Vampire in Brooklyn (1995)
- Vampire Circus (1972)
- Vampire Clan (2002)
- Vampire Cleanup Department (2017)
- Vampire Controller (2001)
- Vampire Cop Ricky (2006)
- Vampire Diary (2007)
- Vampire Dog (2012)
- The Vampire Doll (1970)
- The Vampire of Düsseldorf (1965)
- Vampire Girl vs. Frankenstein Girl (2009)
- The Vampire Happening (1971)
- Vampire Hunter D (1985)
- Vampire Hunter D: Bloodlust (2000)
- Vampire Journals (1997) (1997)
- Vampire Killers (2009)
- The Vampire Lovers (1970)
- Vampire Moth (1956)
- The Vampire of the Opera (1964)
- Vampire Secrets (2006)
- Vampire Stories: Brothers (2011)
- Vampire vs. Vampire (1989)
- Vampire in Venice (1988)
- The Vampire Who Admires Me (2008)
- The Vampires Night Orgy (1972)
- The Vampire's Ghost (1945)
- Vampire's Kiss (1989)
- Vampirella (1996)
- Vampires (1986)
- Vampires series:
  - Vampires (1998)
  - Vampires: Los Muertos (2002)
  - Vampires: The Turning (2005)
- Les Vampires (1915–16)
- Vampires vs. the Bronx (2020)
- Vampires of Geon (1991–92)
- Vampires in Havana (1985)
- Vampires Suck (2010)
- Vampires of the Velvet Lounge (2026)
- Vampires of Warsaw (1925)
- Vampires vs. Zombies (2004)
- Vamps (2012)
- Vampyr (1932)
- Vampyres (1974)
- Vampyros Lesbos (1971)
- Vamsa Vilakku (1984)
- Vamsa Vruksham (1980)
- Vamsam (2010)
- Vamsha Jyothi (1978)
- Vamsha Vriksha (1972)
- Vamshanikokkadu (1996)
- Vamshi (2008)
- Vamshoddharakudu (2000)
- Vamshodharaka (2015)
- Vamsi (2000)

==== Van ====
- The Van: (1977 & 1996)
- Van de koele meren des doods (1982)
- Van Diemen's Land (2009)
- Van Gogh: (1948 & 1991)
- Van Helsing (2004)
- Van Helsing: The London Assignment (2004)
- The Van Nostrand Tiara (1913)
- Van Nuys Blvd. (1979)
- Van Wilder (2002)
- Van Wilder: Freshman Year (2009)
- Van Wilder: The Rise of Taj (2006)
- Vanaja (2006)
- Vanaja Girija (1994)
- Vanakkam Chennai (2013)
- Vanakkam Thalaiva (2005)
- Vanakkam Vathiyare (1991)
- Vanakkatukuriya Kathaliye (1978)
- Vanamagan (2017)
- Vanamala (1951)
- Vanambadi (1963)
- Vanangamudi (1957)
- Vanaprastham (1999)
- Vanaraja Karzan (1938)
- Vanarasena (1996)
- Vanasundari (1951)
- Vanavarayan Vallavarayan (2014)
- Vance and Pepe's Porn Start (2011)
- The Vancouver Asahi (2014)
- Vandae Maatharam (2010)
- Vandana (1975)
- Vandanam (1989)
- Vande Mataram (1985)
- The Vandergilt Diamond Mystery (1936)
- Vandhaale Magaraasi (1973)
- Vandhaan Vendraan (2011)
- Vandhal Sridevi (2018)
- Vandi (2018)
- Vandichakkaram (1980)
- Vandicholai Chinraasu (1994)
- Vandikkari (1974)
- Vandiny trampoty (1938)
- Vanessa: Her Love Story (1935)
- Vangaveeti (2016)
- Vanguard (2020)
- Vani (1943)
- Vani Rani (1974)
- Vanilla and Chocolate (2004)
- Vanilla Sky (2001)
- Vanina Vanini (1961)
- Vanish (2015)
- Vanished: (1995 & 2009)
- The Vanished (2018)
- The Vanished Elephant (2014)
- Vanished – Left Behind: Next Generation (2016)
- The Vanished Murderer (2015)
- A Vanished World (1922)
- The Vanishing: (1988, 1993 & 2019)
- Vanishing on 7th Street (2011)
- The Vanishing Act (TBD)
- Vanishing Africa (1982)
- The Vanishing American: (1925 & 1955)
- Vanishing of the Bees (2009)
- The Vanishing Dagger (1920)
- The Vanishing Duck (1958)
- The Vanishing Frontier (1932)
- The Vanishing Lady (1896)
- Vanishing Men (1932)
- The Vanishing Outpost (1951)
- The Vanishing Pioneer (1928)
- Vanishing Point: (1971, 1997 & 2012)
- The Vanishing Prairie (1954)
- The Vanishing Private (1942)
- The Vanishing Riders (1935)
- The Vanishing Shadow (1934)
- The Vanishing of Sidney Hall (2017)
- Vanishing Time: A Boy Who Returned (2016)
- Vanishing Trails (1920)
- The Vanishing Virginian (1942)
- Vanishing Waves (2012)
- The Vanishing Westerner (1950)
- Vanitha Police (1984)
- Vanity: (1927, 1935, 1947 & 2015)
- Vanity Fair: (1915, 1922, 1923, 1932 & 2004)
- The Vanity Pool (1918)
- The Vanity Serum (2004)
- Vanity's Price (1924)
- Vaniusha and The Giant (1993)
- Vaniusha The Newcomer (1990)
- Vaniusha and The Space Pirate (1991)
- Vanjagan (2006)
- Vanjagar Ulagam (2018)
- Vanjam (1953)
- Vanjikottai Valiban (1958)
- Vanmala (1941)
- Vanmam (2014)
- Vanna Jigina (2015)
- Vanna Kanavugal (1987)
- Vanna Thamizh Pattu (2000)
- Vanna Vanna Pookkal (1992)
- Vannakili (1959)
- Vannu Kandu Keezhadakki (1985)
- The Vanquished (1953)
- Vanquisher (2009)
- Vantage Point (2008)
- Vantha Rajavathaan Varuven (2019)
- Vanya on 42nd Street (1994)

==== Vap–Vaq ====
- Vapor (2010)
- Vapors (1965)
- Vaquero (2011)
- The Vaquero's Vow (1908)

==== Var ====
- Vara: A Blessing (2013)
- Vara Vikrayam (1939)
- Varadakshina (1977)
- Varadhanayaka (2013)
- Varakatnam (1969)
- Varalaru (2006)
- Varam (1993)
- Varan the Unbelievable (1958)
- Varanmaare Aavashyamundu (1983)
- Varaphalam (1994)
- Varaprasadham (1976)
- Varasudochhadu (1988)
- Varasudu (1993)
- Varat Aali Gharat (2009)
- Varathan (2018)
- Varavelpu (1989)
- Varavu Ettana Selavu Pathana (1994)
- Varavu Nalla Uravu (1990)
- Vardaan (1975)
- Vardhakya Puranam (1994)
- Vardi (1989)
- Vares: Private Eye (2004)
- Vargam (2006)
- Varian's War (2001)
- The Variegateds Case (1958)
- Varietease (1954)
- Varieties on Parade (1951)
- Variety: (1925, 1935, 1971 & 1983)
- Variety Girl (1947)
- Variety Is the Spice of Life (1939)
- Variety Jubilee (1943)
- Variety Lights (1951)
- Variety Parade (1936)
- Variety Time (1948)
- Variola Vera (1982)
- Various Positions (2002)
- The Varmint (1917)
- Varnajalam (2004)
- Varnam: (1989 & 2011)
- Varnapakittu (1997)
- Varning för Jönssonligan (1981)
- Varraar Sandiyar (1995)
- Varsha (2005)
- Varshadhare (2010)
- Varsham: (2004 & 2014)
- Varshangal Poyathariyathe (1987)
- Varsity (1928)
- Varsity Blues (1999)
- Varsity Show (1937)
- Vartak Nagar (2017)
- Vartha (1986)
- Varthamana (2018)
- Varthamana Kalam (1990)
- Vartioitu kylä 1944 (1978)
- Varumayin Niram Sivappu (1980)
- Varusham Padhinaaru (1989)
- Varushamellam Vasantham (2002)
- Varuthapadatha Valibar Sangam (2013)
- Varuvan Vadivelan (1978)

==== Vas ====
- Vasandhathil Or Naal (1982)
- Vasantam (2003)
- Vasantasena (1941)
- Vasantha Geetam (1984)
- Vasantha Geetha (1980)
- Vasantha Lakshmi (1978)
- Vasantha Maligai (1972)
- Vasantha Poornima (1993)
- Vasantha Raagam (1986)
- Vasantha Sena: (1967 & 1985)
- Vasantha Vaasal (1996)
- Vasanthakala Paravai (1991)
- Vasantham Vanthachu (2007)
- Vasanthamalika (2002)
- Vasanthi (1988)
- Vasanthiyum Lakshmiyum Pinne Njaanum (1999)
- Vasantsena (1942)
- Vase de Noces (1974)
- Vasectomy: A Delicate Matter (1986)
- Vaseegara (2003)
- Vashyam (1991)
- Vasika... kalispera sas (1982)
- Vasaliki (1997)
- Vasilisa (2014)
- Vasilisa the Beautiful: (1939 & 1977)
- Vaska Easoff (1996)
- Vasool (2008)
- Vasool Raja MBBS (2004)
- Vassa (1983)
- Vassa Zheleznova (1953)
- The Vast of Night (2019)
- Vastadu Naa Raju (2011)
- Vasthuhara (1991)
- Vastupurush (2002)
- Vasu (2002)
- Vasudha (1992)
- Vasuki (1997)
- Vasundhara (2014)
- Vasuvum Saravananum Onna Padichavanga (2015)
- Vasya (2002)

==== Vat ====
- Vattathukkul Chaduram (1978)
- Vatel (2000)
- Vater Morgana (2010)
- Vater sein dagegen sehr (1957)
- Vathikuchi (2013)
- Vathiyar (2006)
- Vathsalya (1965)
- Vathsalya Patha (1980)
- The Vatican Affair (1968)
- Vatican Conspiracy (1982)
- The Vatican Tapes (2015)
- Vatsalyam (1993)
- Vattam (2022)
- Vattaram (2006)

==== Vau–Vaz ====
- Vaudhu (1993)
- Vault (2019)
- The Vault: (2017 & 2021)
- The Vault of Horror (1973)
- Vavien (2009)
- Vaxxed: From Cover-Up to Catastrophe (2016)
- Vay Arkadaş (2010)
- Vaya (2016)
- Vaya con Dios (2002)
- Vayal (1981)
- Vayanadan Thamban (1978)
- Vayasu Pasanga (2004)
- Vayasu Pilichindi (1978)
- Vayuputra (2009)
- Vayyari Bhama (1953)
- Vayyari Bhamalu Vagalamari Bhartalu (1982)
- Vazandar (2016)
- Vazante (2017)
- Vazha Pirandhaval (1953)
- Vazhakku Enn 18/9 (2012)
- Vazhi Piranthadu (1964)
- Vazhi Pizhacha Santhathi (1968)
- Vazhivilakku (1976)
- Vazhiyorakazchakal (1987)
- Vazhkai Vazhvatharke (1964)
- Vazhunnor (1999)
- Vazhvile Oru Naal (1956)
- Vazhvey Maayam (1982)
- Vazhvu En Pakkam (1976)

=== Vc ===
- Vchera (1988)

=== Ve ===
==== Ved ====
- Ved (2022)
- Ved kongelunden... (1953)
- Ved verdens ende (2009)
- Veda: (2010 & 2022)
- Vedalam (2015)
- Vedam (2010)
- Vedan (1993)
- Vedappan (2009)
- Vedavathi Alladhu Seetha Jananam (1941)
- Vedha (2008)
- Vedhala Ulagam (1948)
- Vedham (2001)
- Vedham Pudhithu (1987)
- Vedi (2011)
- Vedigundu Murugesan (2009)
- Vedigundu Pasangge (2018)
- Vedikkai En Vadikkai (1990)
- Vedikkettu (1980)
- Vedivazhipadu (2013)

==== Vee ====
- Vee Beyvafa (2016)
- Veede (2003)
- Veedevadandi Babu (1997)
- Veedevadu (2017)
- Veedhi (2006)
- Veedu (1988)
- Veedu Manaivi Makkal (1988)
- Veedu Oru Swargam (1977)
- Veedu Theda (2011)
- Veendum (1986)
- Veendum Chalikkunna Chakram (1984)
- Veendum Chila Veettukaryangal (1999)
- Veendum Kannur (2012)
- Veendum Lisa (1987)
- Veendum Prabhatham (1973)
- Veer: (1995 & 2010)
- Veer! (2012)
- Veer Ghatotkach (1949)
- Veer Hamirji – Somnath ni Sakhate (2012)
- Veer Kunal (1945)
- Veer Savarkar (2001)
- Veer Tejaji (1982)
- Veer-Zaara (2004)
- Veera: (1994, 2011, 2013 & 2018)
- Veera Bahu (2011)
- Veera Bhoga Vasantha Rayalu (2018)
- Veera Jagathis (1938)
- Veera Kankanam (1957)
- Veera Kannadiga (2004)
- Veera Kesari (1963)
- Veera Madakari (2009)
- Veera Padhakkam (1994)
- Veera Parampare (2010)
- Veera Puran Appu (1978)
- Veera Ramani (1939)
- Veera Sankalpa (1964)
- Veera Sindhoora Lakshmana (1977)
- Veera Sivaji (2016)
- Veera Telangana (2010)
- Veera Thalattu (1998)
- Veeraana (2010)
- Veerabhadra (2006)
- Veerabhadran (1979)
- Veerabhimanyu (1965)
- Veeradhi Veera (1985)
- Veerakkanal (1960)
- Veeram Vilanja Mannu (1998)
- Veeramani (1994)
- Veeramum Eeramum (2007)
- Veetula Raman Veliyila Krishnan (1983)

==== Veg–Vek ====
- Vegam: (2007 & 2014)
- Vegas, City of Dreams (2001)
- Vegas In Space (1993)
- The Vegas Strip War (1984)
- Vegas Vacation (1997)
- Vegetarian (2010)
- Vegetarian Cannibal (2012)
- Vegucated (2011)
- Vehey Vaarey Therein (2005)
- Vehicle 19 (2013)
- The Veil: (2016 & 2017)
- The Veil Dancer (1929)
- The Veil of Twilight (2014)
- The Veiled Adventure (1919)
- Veiled Aristocrats (1932)
- The Veiled Woman (1929)
- The Veils of Bagdad (1953)
- The Vein (1928)
- Veinte pasos para la muerte (1970)
- Vekh Baraatan Challiyan (2017)
- Vektor (2010)

==== Vel–Vem ====
- Vel (2007)
- Vela (2023)
- Velai (1998)
- Velai Kidaichuduchu (1990)
- Velaiilla Pattadhari (2014)
- Velaiilla Pattadhari 2 (2017)
- Velaikaran (1952)
- Velaikari (1949)
- Velaikari Magal (1953)
- Velaikkaran: (1987 & 2017)
- Velainu Vandhutta Vellaikaaran (2016)
- Velakkaran (1953)
- Velan (2021)
- Velayudham (2011)
- The Veldt (1987)
- Velicham Vitharunna Penkutty (1982)
- Velichamillatha Veedhi (1984)
- Veliko suđenje (1961)
- Velipadinte Pusthakam (2017)
- Vellai Pookal (2019)
- Vellai Roja (1983)
- Vellaikaara Durai (2014)
- Vellakkuppayam (2014)
- Vellaiya Irukiravan Poi Solla Maatan (2015)
- Vellaiya Thevan (1990)
- Vellam (1985)
- Vellanakalude Nadu (1988)
- Vellarikka Pattanam (1985)
- Vellaripravinte Changathi (2011)
- Vellathooval (2009)
- Vellayani Paramu (1979)
- Velli Thirai (2008)
- Velli Vizha (1972)
- Vellikizhamai Viratham (1974)
- Vellimoonga (2014)
- Vellinakshatram: (1949 & 2004)
- Vellithira (2003)
- Vellivelichathil (2014)
- Velliyazhcha (1969)
- Vellore Maavattam (2010)
- Velluvili (1978)
- Le Vélo de Ghislain Lambert (2001)
- The VelociPastor (2018)
- The Velocity of Gary (1999)
- Velocity Trap (1999)
- Veluchami (1995)
- Velugu Needalu (1961)
- Velum Mayilum Thunai (1979)
- Velundu Vinaiyillai (1987)
- Velutha Kathreena (1968)
- Veluthambi Dalawa (1962)
- Veluthu Kattu (2010)
- Velvet Buzzsaw (2019)
- Velvet Goldmine (1998)
- The Velvet Paw (1916)
- Velvet Smooth (1976)
- The Velvet Touch (1948)
- The Velvet Underground (2021)
- The Velvet Underground and Nico: A Symphony of Sound (1966)
- The Velvet Vampire (1971)
- Velvi (2008)
- Vembanad (1991)
- Vembu (2025)
- Vemulawada Bheemakavi (1976)

==== Ven ====
- Ven mi corazón te llama (1942)
- Ven Shankhu Pol (2011)
- Venal (1981)
- Venal Kinavukal (1991)
- Venalil Oru Mazha (1979)
- Vendetta: (1919, 1950, 1986, 1995, 1999, 2013, 2015, 2017 & 2022)
- Vendetta dal futuro (1986)
- Vendetta di zingara (1950)
- Vendetta for a Samurai (1952)
- Vendetta for the Saint (1969 TV)
- Vendetta... sarda (1951)
- The Vendor (2018)
- Vendredi soir (2002)
- Veneno para las hadas (1984)
- The Venerable Ones (1962)
- Veneri al sole (1965)
- The Venetian (1958)
- The Venetian Affair (1967)
- Venetian Bird (1952)
- Venetian Honeymoon (1959)
- Venetian Lovers (1925)
- Venetian Nights (1931)
- The Venetian Woman (1986)
- Vengeance: (1930, 1958, 1968, 1970, 2009, 2014 & 2022)
- Vengeance of an Assassin (2014)
- Vengeance of the Dead (1917)
- Vengeance of the Deep (1923)
- Vengeance Is a Dish Served Cold (1971)
- The Vengeance of Fu Manchu (1967)
- The Vengeance of Galora (1913)
- Vengeance Is Mine: (1916, 1917, 1935, 1949, 1968 & 1979)
- Vengeance Is My Forgiveness (1968)
- The Vengeance of Jago (1912)
- The Vengeance of Pancho Villa (1967)
- Vengeance of Rannah (1936)
- The Vengeance of She (1968)
- The Vengeance of Ursus (1961)
- Vengeance Valley (1951)
- Vengeance of the Vikings (1965)
- The Vengeance of the Winged Serpent (1984)
- Vengeance of the Zombies (1973)
- Vengeance: A Love Story (2017)
- Vengeful Beauty (1978)
- Vengeful Heart (2014)
- Vengo (2000)
- Venice (2014)
- Venice Bound (1995)
- Venice Medical (1983)
- The Venice Project (1999)
- Venice/Venice (1992)
- Venkatadri Express (2013)
- Venkatapuram (2017)
- Venom (1971)
- Venom (1981)
- Venom (2005)
- Venom series:
  - Venom: Truth in Journalism (2013, short)
  - Venom (2018)
  - Venom: Let There Be Carnage (2021)
  - Venom: The Last Dance (2024)
- Venomous (2001)
- Le vent de la nuit (1999)
- Venture of Faith (1951)
- Venus: (2006 & 2017)
- Venus in the East (1919)
- Venus Flytrap (1970)
- Venus in Fur (2013)
- Venus in Furs (1969)
- Venus Makes Trouble (1937)
- Venus and Mars: (2001 & 2007)
- The Venus Model (1918)
- The Venus of Montmartre (1925)
- Venus Peter (1989)
- Venus Rising (1995)
- Venus and Serena (2012)
- Venus and the Sun (2011)
- Venus of Venice (1927)
- Venus Wars (1989)

==== Vep ====
- Veppam (2011)
- Vepraalam (1984)

==== Ver ====
- Vera Cruz (1954)
- Vera Drake (2004)
- Verax (2013)
- Verbena Tragica (1939)
- Verboten! (1959)
- Verdens Undergang (1916)
- Verdi, the King of Melody (1953)
- Verdict (1974)
- The Verdict: (1946, 1959, 1982 & 2013)
- The Verdict of the Heart (1915)
- The Verdict of Lake Balaton (1933)
- Verdict of the Sea (1932)
- Vere Vazhi Ille (2015)
- Veritas, Prince of Truth (2007)
- Verity (2026)
- The Vermilion Pencil (1922)
- Vermont Is for Lovers (1992)
- Verna (2017)
- Verna: USO Girl (1978)
- Vernon, Florida (1981)
- The Verona Trial (1963)
- Veronica Guerin (2003)
- Veronica Mars (2014)
- Veronica's Wish (2018)
- Veronika Decides to Die (2012)
- Veronika Voss (1982)
- The Versace Murder (1998)
- The Verse of Us (2015)
- Versus: (2000 & 2016)
- Vertical Limit (2000)
- Vertical Ray of the Sun (2000)
- Vertigo (1958)
- Very Annie Mary (2001)
- Very Bad Things (1998)
- The Very Best Day (2015)
- A Very Brady Christmas (1988 TV)
- A Very Brady Sequel (1996)
- A Very British Cover-up (2009)
- A Very Christmas Story (2000)
- Very Confidential (1927)
- A Very Curious Girl (1969)
- The Very Edge (1963)
- A Very English Murder (1974)
- The Very Excellent Mr. Dundee (2020)
- Very Good Girls (2013)
- A Very Good Young Man (1919)
- A Very Harold & Kumar 3D Christmas (2011)
- A Very Honorable Guy (1934)
- The Very Idea (1929)
- Very Important Person (1961)
- The Very Late Afternoon of a Faun (1983)
- A Very Long Engagement (2004)
- Very Mean Men (2000)
- A Very Merry Daughter of the Bride (2008)
- A Very Merry Mix-Up (2013)
- A Very Merry Pooh Year (2002)
- The Very Merry Widows (2003)
- A Very Moral Night (1977)
- A Very Murray Christmas (2015)
- A Very Natural Thing (1974)
- Very Nice, Very Nice (1961)
- A Very Private Affair (1962)
- The Very Private Life of Mister Sim (2015)
- The Very Same Munchhausen (1979)
- A Very Serious Person (2006)
- A Very Short Life (2009)
- A Very Special Favor (1965)
- A Very Special Love series:
  - A Very Special Love (2008)
  - You Changed My Life (2009)
  - It Takes a Man and a Woman (2013)
- The Very Thought of You: (1944 & 1998)
- A Very Unlucky Leprechaun (1998)
- Very Young Girls (2007)
- A Very Young Lady (1941)

==== Ves–Vez ====
- Veselá bída (1944)
- Vesham (2004)
- Vesna (1953)
- Vesper (2022)
- Vessel (2014)
- The Vessel (2016)
- Vessel of Wrath (1938)
- The Vesuvians (1997)
- Veta (2014)
- Vetagaadu (1979)
- Veteran (2015)
- The Veteran: (2006 & 2011)
- The Veteran of Waterloo (1933)
- The Veterinarian's Adopted Children (1968)
- Vetri (1984)
- Vetri Karangal (1991)
- Vetri Kodi Kattu (2000)
- Vetri Padigal (1991)
- Vetri Selvan (2014)
- Vetri Vinayagar (1996)
- Vetri Vizha (1989)
- Vetrikku Oruvan (1979)
- Vetrivel Sakthivel (2005)
- Vetta (1984)
- Vettah (2016)
- Vettai (2012)
- Vettaikaaran: (1964 & 2009)
- Vettaiyaadu Vilaiyaadu (2006)
- Vettam (2004)
- Vettu Onnu Thundu Rendu (1998)
- Veve (2014)
- Veyil: (2006 & 2022)
- Veyilmarangal (2019)
- Vezhambal (1977)

=== Vi ===
- Vi arme syndere (1952)
- Vi bygger landet (1936)
- Vi er allesammen tossede (1959)
- Vi flyr på Rio (1949)
- Vi gifter oss (1951)
- Vi hade i alla fall tur med vädret (1980 TV)
- Vi hade i alla fall tur med vädret – igen (2008)
- Vi har det jo dejligt (1963)
- Vi of Smith's Alley (1921)
- Vi som går kjøkkenveien (1933)
- Vi vil leve (1946)
- Vi vil oss et land... (1936)
- Vi vil skilles (1952)

==== Via–Vib ====
- Via Darjeeling (2008)
- Via degli specchi (1982)
- Via Mala: (1945 & 1961)
- Via Montenapoleone (1986)
- Le Viager (1972)
- Viaggi di nozze (1995)
- Viaggio sentimentale a Roma (1951)
- Viaje (2015)
- Viaje a la luna (1958)
- Viaje de una noche de verano (1965)
- Viaje sin regreso (1946)
- Un Viaje al más allá (1963)
- Un viaje con Fidel (2015)
- Viajera (1952)
- Viale della canzone (1965)
- Vibes (1988)
- Vibrations (1996)
- Vibrator (2003)

==== Vic ====
- Vic (2006)
- Vic and Flo Saw a Bear (2013)
- The Vicar of Bray (1937)
- The Vicar of Vejlby: (1922 & 1931)
- The Vicar of Wakefield: (1910, 1913, 1916 & 1917)
- Vice: (2007, 2008, 2015 & 2018)
- The Vice (1915)
- Vice Academy series:
  - Vice Academy (1989)
  - Vice Academy 2 (1990)
  - Vice Academy 3 (1991)
  - Vice Academy 4 (1995)
  - Vice Academy 5 (1996)
  - Vice Academy 6 (1998)
- The Vice of Gambling (1923)
- Vice Girls (1996)
- The Vice of Hope (2018)
- The Vice of Humanity (1927)
- Vice Raid (1960)
- Vice Squad: (1953, 1978 & 1982)
- The Vice Squad (1931)
- Vice Versa: (1916, 1948 & 1988)
- Vice and Virtue (1963)
- Viceroy's House (2017)
- Vichithram (2022)
- Vichitra Bandham (1972)
- Vichitra Jeevitham (1978)
- Vichitra Kutumbam (1969)
- Vichitra Prema (1991)
- Vichitra Vanitha (1947)
- Vicious Circle: (1999 & 2008)
- The Vicious Circle: (1948 & 1957)
- Vicious Fun (2020)
- The Vicious Kind (2009)
- The Vicious Years (1950)
- Vicki (1953)
- Vicky Cristina Barcelona (2008)
- Le Vicomte de Bragelonne (1954)
- Victim: (1961, 1999 & 2011)
- The Victim: (1916, 1980, 2006, 2011 & 2012)
- Victim of the Brain (1988)
- Victim of Desire (1995)
- Victim Five (1964)
- Victim of Love (1991)
- A Victim of the Mormons (1911)
- Victims (1982)
- Victims of Passion (1922)
- Victims of Vice (1978)
- Victims for Victims: The Theresa Saldana Story (1984)
- Victor: (1951, 1993, 2008 & 2009)
- The Victor (1932)
- Victor and Victoria: (1933 & 1957)
- Victor Crowley (2017)
- Victor Frankenstein (2015)
- Victor/Victoria: (1982 & 1995 TV)
- Victoria: (1935, 1972, 1979, 2008, 2013 & 2015)
- Victoria & Abdul (2017)
- The Victoria Cross (1916)
- The Victoria Cross: For Valour (2003)
- Victoria Day (2009)
- Victoria in Dover: (1936 & 1954)
- Victoria the Great (1937)
- Victoria and Her Hussar: (1931 & 1954)
- Victoria No. 203: (1972 & 2007)
- Victorious Return (1947)
- The Victors: (1918 & 1963)
- Victory: (1919, 1928, 1938, 1940, 1976, 1996, 2008, 2009 & 2013)
- Victory 2 (2018)
- The Victory of Conscience (1916)
- The Victory of Faith (1933)
- Victory Is Mine (1956)
- The Victory Leaders (1919)
- Victory March (1976)
- Victory and Peace (1918)
- The Victory Sun (1953)
- Victory Through Air Power (1943)

==== Vid ====
- Vida de Menina (2004)
- Vida y milagros de Don Fausto (1924)
- Vida nocturna (1955)
- Vidaaya (2015)
- Vidar the Vampire (2017)
- Vidarunna Mottukal (1977)
- Vidas marcadas (1942)
- Vidas Secas (1963)
- Vidayutham (2016)
- Video Clip (2007)
- Video Days (1991)
- Video Dead (1987)
- Video Demons Do Psychotown (1989)
- Video de Familia (2001)
- Video Fool for Love (1996)
- Video Games: The Movie (2014)
- Video Nasties: Moral Panic, Censorship & Videotape (2010)
- Video Violence (1987)
- Video Vixens (1975)
- Video Voyeur (2002)
- Videocracy (2009)
- Videodrome (1983)
- Videograms of a Revolution (1992)
- Videophilia (and Other Viral Syndromes) (2015)
- Videsi Nair Swadesi Nair (2002)
- Vidhaata (1982)
- Vidheyan (1993)
- Vidhi Madhi Ultaa (2018)
- Vidhi Thanna Vilakku (1962)
- Vidhi Vilasa (1962)
- Vidhichathum Kothichathum (1982)
- Vidhivilasa (1962)
- Vidhu (2010)
- Vidhyarambham (1990)
- Vidhyarthikale Ithile Ithile (1972)
- Vidinja Kalyanam (1986)
- Vidiyum Munn (2013)
- Vidiyum Varai Kaathiru (1981)
- Vidocq: (1939 & 2001)
- Vidukathai (1997)
- Viduthalai: (1954, 1986 & 2023)
- Vidya (1948)
- Vidyapathi (1946)
- Vidyapati (1937)
- Vidyardhi (2004)
- Vidyarthi (1968)

==== Vie ====
- La vie en rose (2007)
- Vie et Passion du Christ (1903)
- Viejo smoking (1930)
- Viejos amigos (2014)
- Viel Lärm um nichts (1964)
- Viena and the Fantomes (2020)
- Vieni avanti cretino (1982)
- Vienna (1968)
- Vienna 1910 (1943)
- Vienna Blood (1942)
- Vienna, City of My Dreams: (1928 & 1957)
- Vienna, City of Song: (1923 & 1930)
- Vienna, How it Cries and Laughs (1926)
- Vienna Tales (1940)
- Vienna Waltzes (1951)
- Viennese Girls (1945)
- Viennese Nights (1930)
- Viennese Waltz (1932)
- Viento salvaje (1974)
- Vier gegen die Bank: (1976 & 2016)
- Vier Jongens en een Jeep (1955)
- Vietato ai minori (1992)
- Vietnam Colony: (1992 & 1994)
- Vietnam, Long Time Coming (1998)
- Vietnam Nurses (2005)
- Vietnam: The Last Battle (1995)
- Vietnam Veedu (1970)
- Vietnam! Vietnam! (1971)
- Vietnam War Story II (1988)
- Vieuphoria (1994)
- Le vieux fusil (1975)
- A View from the Bridge (1962)
- A View from Eiffel Tower (2005)
- A View from a Hill (2005 TV)
- A View to a Kill (1985)
- A View of Love (2010)
- The View from Pompey's Head (1955)
- View from the Top (2003)
- The Viewing Booth (2019)

==== Vig–Vik ====
- Vigathakumaran (1930)
- Vigil (1984)
- The Vigil: (1914, 1998 & 2019)
- Vigil in the Night (1940)
- Vigilante (1982)
- Vigilante 3D (2013)
- A Vigilante (2018)
- The Vigilante (1947)
- Vigilante Diaries (2016)
- Vigilante Force (1976)
- Vigilante Hideout (1950)
- Vigilante Terror (1953)
- Vigilante Vigilante: The Battle for Expression (2011)
- The Vigilantes Are Coming (1936)
- Vigilantes of Boomtown (1947)
- Vigilantes of Dodge City (1944)
- The Vigilantes Return (1947)
- The Vigilantes Ride (1943)
- Vigilantes y ladrones (1952)
- Vigour (1990)
- Vihir (2009)
- Viimne reliikvia (1969)
- Vijay: (1942, 1988 & 1989)
- Vijay and I (2013)
- Vijay Lakshmi (1943)
- Vijay Superum Pournamiyum (2019)
- Vijay Vikram (1979)
- Vijaya Gauri (1955)
- Vijaya Kuweni (2012)
- Vijayaba Kollaya (2019)
- Vijayadasami (2007)
- Vijayakumari (1950)
- Vijayalakshmi (1946)
- Vijayam Manade (1970)
- Vijayam Nammude Senani (1979)
- Vijayanagarada Veeraputhra (1961)
- Vijayanum Veeranum (1979)
- Vijayapuri Veeran (1960)
- Vijayaramaraju (2000)
- Vijayendra Varma (2004)
- Vijaypath (1994)
- Vijeta: (1982 & 1996)
- Vijetha (1985)
- Vijetha Vikram (1987)
- Vijftig jaren (1948)
- Vikadakavi (2011)
- Vikadakumaran (2018)
- Vikadan (2003)
- Vikaljarek (2016)
- Vikatakavi (1984)
- Vikatayogi (1946)
- Viking (2016)
- The Viking: (1928 & 1931)
- The Viking Queen (1967)
- A Viking Saga (2008)
- The Viking Sagas (1995)
- The Viking Watch of the Danish Seaman (1948)
- Vikingdom (2013)
- The Vikings (1958)
- Vikram: (1986 Tamil & 1986 Telugu)
- Vikram Vedha (2017)
- Vikram Vetal (1986)
- Vikrama Urvashi (1940)
- Vikramaadhithan (1962)
- Vikramadithyan (2014)
- Vikramaditya (1945)
- Vikramarkudu (2006)
- Viktor (2014)
- Viktor Vogel – Commercial Man (2001)
- Viktoria (2014)

==== Vil–Vim ====
- The Vila Family (1950)
- Vile (2011)
- Vileness Fats (unfinished)
- Villa!! (1958)
- Villa Estrella (2009)
- A Villa in Los Angeles (2013)
- Villa Rides (1968)
- The Villa in Tiergarten Park (1927)
- Villa Zone (1975)
- The Village: (1953, 2004 & 2015)
- A Village Affair (1995)
- The Village Barbershop (2008)
- Village Barn Dance (1940)
- The Village Blacksmith: (1917 & 1922)
- Village of the Damned: (1960 & 1995)
- Village of Daughters (1962)
- Village Detective (1969)
- The Village Doctor (1951)
- Village of the Giants (1965)
- Village of Idiots (1999)
- The Village of Love (1950)
- The Village 'Neath the Sea (1914)
- The Village of No Return (2017)
- The Village Priest (1927)
- The Village on the River (1958)
- The Village Rogue (1916)
- A Village Scandal (1915)
- The Village Sleuth (1920)
- The Village Squire (1935)
- Village Tale (1935)
- The Village Teacher (1947)
- The Village Under the Sky (1953)
- Village Wooing (1962)
- The Villagers (2018)
- Villain: (1971 & 2002)
- The Villain: (1917, 1979, 2009 & 2018)
- The Villain Foiled (1911)
- The Villain Still Pursued Her (1940)
- The Villainess (2017)
- Villains (2019)
- The Villiers Diamond (1938)
- Vimaanam (2017)
- Vimala (1960)
- Vimochanam (1939)
- Vimochanasamaram (1971)
- Vimukthi (2010)

==== Vin ====
- Vinaya Vidheya Rama (2019)
- Vinayaka Geleyara Balaga (2011)
- Vinayakudu (2008)
- Vinayapoorvam Vidhyaadharan (2000)
- Vince and Kath and James (2016)
- Vincent: (1982 & 1987)
- Vincent, François, Paul and the Others (1974)
- Vincent and Me (1990)
- Vincent N Roxxy (2016)
- Vincent & Theo (1990)
- Vincent Wants to Sea (2010)
- Vincent Who? (2009)
- Vinci (2004)
- Vinci Da (2019)
- Vinden blåser vart den vill (2017)
- Vindhyarani (1948)
- Vindication (2008)
- The Vindicator (1986)
- Vineta, the Sunken City (1923)
- The Vineyard (1989)
- A Vingança de uma Mulher (2012)
- Vinmeengal (2012)
- Vinnaithaandi Varuvaayaa (2010)
- Vinnukum Mannukum (2001)
- Vinobraní (1982)
- Vinodam (1996)
- Vinodayathra (2007)
- The Vintage (1957)
- Vintage Wine (1935)
- Vinterland (2007)
- Vinyan (2008)
- Vinyl: (1965, 2000 & 2012)

==== Vio–Vip ====
- Le Viol du Vampire (1968)
- Violated (1996)
- Violated Paradise (1963)
- Violated! (1974)
- Violation (2020)
- Violator (2014)
- The Violators (1957)
- Violence: (1947 & 1955)
- Violence in a Women's Prison (1982)
- Violent Blue (2011)
- The Violent Enemy (1968)
- The Violent Heart (2020)
- Violent Is the Word for Curly (1938)
- The Violent Kind (2010)
- Violent Life (1961)
- A Violent Life (1990)
- The Violent Men (1955)
- Violent Midnight (1963)
- Violent Moment (1959)
- Violent Naples (1976)
- Violent Night series:
  - Violent Night (2022)
  - Violent Night 2 (2026)
- The Violent Ones (1967)
- The Violent Patriot (1956)
- Violent Playground (1958)
- The Violent Professionals (1973)
- A Violent Prosecutor (2016)
- Violent Road (1958)
- Violent Rome (1975)
- Violent Saturday (1955)
- A Violent Separation (2019)
- The Violent Years (1956)
- Violet: (1921, 1978, 1981 & 2021)
- Violet & Daisy (2013)
- The Violet Eater (1926)
- The Violet of Potsdamer Platz (1936)
- The Violet Seller (1958)
- Violet Tendencies (2010)
- Violets Are Blue (1986)
- Violette Nozière (1978)
- Violin: (2011 & 2017)
- The Violin (2005)
- The Violin King (1923)
- The Violin Maker (1915)
- The Violin Maker of Cremona (1909)
- The Violin Maker of Mittenwald (1950)
- The Violin of Monsieur (1914)
- The Violin Player (1994)
- Viper (2001)
- The Viper: (1938 & 1965)
- Viper Club (2018)
- Vipers (2008)
- Viplavakarikal (1968)

==== Vir ====
- Virados do Avesso (2014)
- Viral: (2016 American & 2016 Hindi)
- The Viral Factor (2012)
- Virgin (2003)
- The Virgin (1924)
- A Virgin Among the Living Dead (1973)
- The Virgin, the Copts and Me (2011)
- The Virgin and the Gypsy (1970)
- Virgin Island (1958)
- Virgin Lips (1928)
- The Virgin of Lust (2002)
- The Virgin and the Macho Man (1974)
- The Virgin Man (1956)
- The Virgin Mart (1974)
- The Virgin of Nuremberg (1963)
- A Virgin Paradise (1921)
- The Virgin Psychics (2015)
- The Virgin Queen: (1923 & 1955)
- The Virgin Queen of St. Francis High (1987)
- The Virgin of the Seminole (1922)
- The Virgin Soldiers (1969)
- The Virgin Spring (1960)
- The Virgin of Stamboul (1920)
- Virgin Stripped Bare by Her Bachelors (2000)
- The Virgin Suicides (1999)
- Virgin Territory (2007)
- The Virgin Wife (1958)
- Virgin Witch (1971)
- Virginia: (1941 & 2010)
- Virginia City (1940)
- A Virginia Courtship (1921)
- Virginia Creepers (2009)
- The Virginia Judge (1935)
- A Virginia Romance (1916)
- Virginia Woolf's Night and Day (2026)
- Virginia's Husband: (1928 & 1934)
- Virginia's Run (2002)
- The Virginian: (1914, 1923, 1929 & 1946)
- The Virginity Hit (2010)
- The Virgins (2016)
- Virgins of the Seven Seas (1974)
- The Virgo, the Taurus and the Capricorn (1977)
- Viridiana (1961)
- Virtual Desire (1995)
- Virtual JFK (2008)
- Virtual Nightmare (2000 TV)
- Virtual Obsession (1998 TV)
- Virtual Seduction (1995 TV)
- Virtual Sexuality (1999)
- Virtually Heroes (2013)
- Virtue (1932)
- Virtuosity (1995)
- The Virtuoso (2021)
- Virtuous (2014)
- The Virtuous Bigamist (1956)
- The Virtuous Husband (1931)
- The Virtuous Model (1919)
- The Virtuous Scoundrel (1953)
- The Virtuous Sin (1930)
- The Virtuous Sinner (1931)
- The Virtuous Thief (1919)
- A Virtuous Vamp (1919)
- Viruddh... Family Comes First (2005)
- Virumaandi (2004)
- Virunga (2014)
- Virus: (1980, 1995, 1999 & 2007)
- Virus Undead (2008)

==== Vis ====
- La Visa Loca (2005)
- Visas and Virtue (1997)
- The Viscount of Monte Cristo (1954)
- Vishwa Thulasi (2004)
- The Vision (1988 TV)
- Vision Quest (1985)
- The Vision of Paolo Soleri: Prophet in the Desert (2013)
- The Visionaries (1968)
- Visioneers (2008)
- Visions (2015)
- Visions of Death (1972)
- Visions of Ecstasy (1989)
- Visions of Eight (1973)
- Visions of Light (1992)
- Visions of Murder (1993)
- A Visit (2018)
- The Visit: (1964, 2000, 2015 America & 2015 Nigeria)
- Visit to a Chief's Son (1974)
- Visit to Minotaur (1987 TV)
- Visit to Picasso (1949)
- A Visit to Santa (1963)
- A Visit to the Seaside (1908)
- Visit to a Small Planet (1960)
- The Visitation (2006)
- Les Visiteurs du Soir (1942)
- Visiting Hours (1982)
- The Visitor: (1974, 1979, 2002, 2007 short, 2007 drama, 2008 & 2015)
- A Visitor to a Museum (1989)
- Visitor Q (2001)
- Visitors: (2003 & 2013)
- The Visitors: (1972 & 1993)
- The Visitors II: The Corridors of Time (1998)
- The Visitors: Bastille Day (2016)
- Visual Acoustics: The Modernism of Julius Shulman (2008)
- The Visual Bible: Acts (1994)
- The Visual Bible: Matthew (1993)

==== Vit–Viz ====
- Vita coi figli (1990)
- Vita & Virginia (2018)
- Vital (2004)
- Vital Signs: (1990 & 2009)
- Vitalina Varela (2019)
- Vito (2011)
- Vitthala Shappath (2017)
- Vitti Dandu (2014)
- Vitus (2006)
- Vitya Glushakov - A Friend of the Apaches (1983)
- Una Viuda descocada (1980)
- Una viuda difícil (1957)
- Viuuulentemente mia (1982)
- A Viuvinha (1914)
- Viva (2007)
- Viva Belarus! (2012)
- Viva Buddy (1934)
- Viva Cangaceiro (1970)
- Viva Cisco Kid (1940)
- Viva Cuba (2005)
- Viva Cuba Lib: Rap is War (2014)
- Viva Erotica (1996)
- Viva Freedom! (1946)
- Viva Knievel! (1977)
- Viva Las Vegas (1964)
- Viva Maria! (1965)
- Viva Max! (1969)
- Viva la Muerte (1971)
- Viva Spider-Man (1980)
- Viva la vie (1984)
- Viva Villa! (1934)
- Viva Zapata! (1952)
- Vivacious Lady (1938)
- Vivah (2006)
- Vivaha Bandham (1964)
- Vivaha Bhojanambu: (1988 & 2021)
- Vivaham Swargathil (1970)
- Vivahasammanam (1971)
- Vivahitha (1970)
- Vivaramana Aalu (2002)
- Vivarium (2019)
- Vivasaayi Magan (1997)
- Vivasayee (1967)
- Vive la France (2013)
- Vive la France! (1918)
- Vive L'Amour (1994)
- Vive le Tour (1962)
- The Vivero Letter (1998)
- Viviana (1916)
- Viviette (1918)
- Vivre sa Vie (1962)
- Vivo (2021)
- The Vixen (1916)
- Vixen! (1968)
- The Vixens of Kung Fu (1975)
- Viy: (1909, 1967 & 2014)
- Viy 2: Journey to China (2019)
- Viyabari (2007)
- Viyapath Bambara (2010)
- Viyarppinte Vila (1962)
- Viyyalavari Kayyalu (2007)
- Vizhi Moodi Yosithaal (2014)
- Vizhithiru (2017)
- Vizontele (2001)
- Vizontele Tuuba (2004)

=== Vl ===
- Vlad (2003)
- Vlad Țepeș (1979)
- Vlčí jáma (1957)
- Vlees (2010)
- Vlogger (2011)

=== Vo ===
==== Voc–Voi ====
- Voces inocentes (2004)
- Vodka Diaries (2018)
- Vodka Lemon (2013)
- Vodkaa, komisario Palmu (1969)
- Una voglia da morire (1965)
- Voglia di donna (1978)
- Voglia di guardare (1986)
- Voglia di vivere (1990)
- Vogue la galère (1973)
- Voi meitä! Anoppi tulee (1933)
- Voice (2005)
- The Voice: (1920, 1966, 1982, 1992 & 2010)
- The Voice of Action (1942)
- The Voice of Bugle Ann (1936)
- The Voice of the Child (1911)
- Voice of the City (1929)
- The Voice of Conscience: (1912, 1917 & 1920)
- A Voice from the Dark (1921)
- A Voice from the Deep (1912)
- The Voice in the Fog (1916)
- Voice from the Grave (1996)
- The Voice of Happiness (1931)
- The Voice of the Heart: (1924 & 1937)
- The Voice of Love (1934)
- The Voice of Merrill (1952)
- The Voice from the Minaret (1923)
- Voice in the Mirror (1958)
- The Voice of the Moon (1990)
- Voice of a Murderer (2007)
- The Voice of My City (1953)
- Voice of My Father (2012)
- Voice in the Night (1934)
- Voice Over (2014)
- The Voice of Passion (1913)
- A Voice Said Goodnight (1932)
- Voice of Silence: (1953 & 2013)
- The Voice from the Sky (1930)
- Voice from the Stone (2017)
- The Voice of the Turtle (1947)
- The Voice of the Violin (1909)
- The Voice of the Voiceless (2013)
- The Voice of Warning (1912)
- Voice of the Whistler (1945)
- The Voice in the Wilderness (1991)
- Voice in the Wind (1944)
- The Voice Within (1946)
- Voice Without a Shadow (1958)
- Voices: (1973 & 1979)
- The Voices (2014)
- Voices of Bam (2006)
- Voices from Beyond (1991)
- Voices from Chernobyl (2016)
- Voices of the Children (1999)
- Voices of the City (1921)
- Voices of Desire (1972)
- Voices of Iraq (2004)
- Voices of Kidnapping (2017)
- Voices in the Night (2003)
- Voices of Sarafina! (1988)
- Voices of Spring: (1933 & 1952)
- Voices of Transition (2012)
- Voices in the Tunnels (2008)
- Voiceless (2016)
- Voices: (1973, 1979 & 2007)
- Void (2013)
- The Void: (2001 & 2016)
- Voir la mer (2011)

==== Voj–Vor ====
- Vojtech, Called the Orphan (1990)
- Vol-au-vent (1996)
- Volando bajo (2014)
- Volavérunt (1999)
- Le Volcan interdit (1966)
- Volcano: (1942, 1950, 1997 & 2011)
- Volcano! (1926)
- The Volcano Disaster (2005)
- Volcano High (2001)
- Volcano: An Inquiry into the Life and Death of Malcolm Lowry (1976)
- Volcano: Fire on the Mountain (1997)
- Volcanoes of the Deep Sea (2003)
- Voldemort: Origins of the Heir (2018)
- Volevo i pantaloni (1990)
- The Volga Boatman (1926)
- Volga Volga (1928)
- Volga-Volga (1938)
- Volhynia (2016)
- Volley (2015)
- Volta (2004)
- A Volta do Filho Pródigo (1978)
- Voltaire (1933)
- La Voltige (1895)
- Voltron: The End (2011)
- Volume (2012)
- Volumes of Blood (2015)
- Volumes of Blood: Horror Stories (2016)
- The Volunteer: (1917 & 1943)
- Volunteers (1985)
- Volver (2006)
- Vom mutigen Hans (1959)
- Von nun ab, Herr Kunze (1956)
- Von Richthofen and Brown (1971)
- Von Ryan's Express (1965)
- The von Trapp Family: A Life of Music (2015)
- Voodoo (1995)
- Voodoo Academy (2000)
- Voodoo Dawn (1990)
- Voodoo Dollz (2008)
- Voodoo Island (1957)
- Voodoo Man (1944)
- Voodoo Moon (2006)
- Voodoo Tiger (1952)
- Voodoo Woman (1957)
- Voor een paar knikkers meer (2006)
- Voorbeschikten (1920)
- The Voorman Problem (2013)
- Voroshilov Shapeshifter (1999)
- Vortex: (1976, 1981, 2009 & 2021)
- The Vortex (1928)
- Vortex, the Face of Medusa (1967)

==== Vot–Voz ====
- Vote for Change? 2004 (2008)
- Vote for Huggett (1949)
- A Vote for the King of the Romans (2016 TV)
- The Vote That Counted (1911)
- Voter (2019)
- Votes for Women (1912)
- Votez Bougon (2016)
- Voto di castità (1976)
- Voulez-vous coucher avec God? (1972)
- Vous êtes de la police? (2007)
- Vous êtes jeunes vous êtes beaux (2018)
- The Vow: (1946 & 2012)
- A Vow to Kill (1995 TV)
- The Vows (1973)
- Vox Lux (2018)
- Vox populi (2008)
- Voy a hablar de la esperanza (1966)
- Voyage: (1993 & 2013)
- The Voyage: (1921 & 1974)
- Le Voyage à Alger (2009)
- Le Voyage en Amérique (1952)
- Voyage to the Bottom of the Sea (1961)
- The Voyage of the Bourrichon Family (1912)
- Voyage of the Damned (1976)
- The Voyage of Doctor Dolittle (2020)
- Le Voyage en douce (1980)
- Voyage to the End of the Universe (1963)
- Le Voyage étranger (1992)
- Voyage to the Planet of Prehistoric Women (1968)
- Voyage to the Prehistoric Planet (1965)
- Voyage of the Rock Aliens (1984)
- The Voyage that Shook the World (2009)
- Voyage of Terror (1998 TV)
- Voyage of Terror: The Achille Lauro Affair (1990 TV)
- Voyage in Time (1983)
- Voyage of Time (2016)
- Voyage of the Unicorn (2001)
- Voyager (1991)
- The Voyager (1991)
- Voyagers (2021)
- Voyeur (2017)
- The Voyeur: (1970 & 1994)
- The Voyeurs (2021)
- Le Voyou (1970)
- A Voz do Carnaval (1933)
- Vozvrashcheniye (2003)

=== Vr–Vy ===
- Vrať se do hrobu! (1990)
- Vroom Vroom Vroooom (1995)
- Vrouwenoogen (1912)
- Vrudhanmare Sookshikkuka (1995)
- Vše pro lásku (1930)
- Vu (2014)
- Vuelve el ojo de vidrio (1970)
- Vuelvo a vivir, vuelvo a cantar (1971)
- Vuga (2000)
- Vuk (1981)
- Vuk samotnjak (1972)
- Vukovar, jedna priča (1994)
- Vukovar: The Way Home (1994)
- Vulcan, Son of Giove (1962)
- Vulgar (2000)
- The Vulgar Hours (2011)
- Vulgaria (2012)
- The Vulture: (1937, 1967, 1981 & 1982)
- The Vulture Wally: (1921, 1940 & 1956)
- The Vulture's Eye (2004)
- The Vultures (1975)
- Vultures of the Sea (1928)
- Vunnadhi Okate Zindagi (2017)
- Vurun Kahpeye (1973)
- Vyaamoham (1978)
- The Vyborg Side (1939)
- Vykuntapali (2011)
- Vyooham (1990)
- Vysotsky. Thank You For Being Alive (2011)
- Vzdušné torpédo 48 (1937)

== W ==
- W: (1974 & 2014)
- W. (2008)
- The WAC from Walla Walla (1952)
- WALL-E (2008)
- W biały dzień (1981)
- W.C. (2007)
- W. C. Fields and Me (1976)
- W./E. (2011)
- W la foca (1982)
- W le donne (1970)
- W.M.D. (2013)
- WMD-The Inside Story (2008)
- WNUF Halloween Special (2013)
- W/O Ram (2018)
- W/o V. Vara Prasad (1998)
- The W Plan (1930)
- W.R.: Mysteries of the Organism (1971)
- W's Tragedy (1984)
- WTF! (2017)
- WUSA (1970)
- W.W. and the Dixie Dancekings (1975)
- WWII: The Long Road Home (2017)
- WWW (2021)
- WWW - What a Wonderful World (2006)
- WXIII: Patlabor the Movie 3 (2002)
- WΔZ (2007)

=== Wa ===
==== Waa–Waf ====
- Waada (1957)
- Waah! Tera Kya Kehna (2002)
- Waah Zindagi (2019)
- Waakya (2017)
- Waapasi (2013)
- Waar (2013)
- Waar 2 (TBD)
- Waaris (1988)
- Waarish (2004)
- Waarrior Savitri (2016)
- Waati (1995)
- Wabash Avenue (1950)
- Wabbit Twouble (1941)
- The Wabbit Who Came to Supper (1942)
- The Wackiest Ship in the Army (1960)
- The Wackiest Wagon Train in the West (1976)
- Wackiki Wabbit (1943)
- The Wackness (2008)
- Wacko (1982)
- Wacky Blackout (1942)
- Wacky-Bye Baby (1948)
- The Wacky World of Mother Goose (1967)
- The Wacky Wabbit (1942)
- Waco: (1952 & 1966)
- Waco, the Big Lie (1993)
- Waco: The Rules of Engagement (1997)
- Wacuś (1935)
- Wada Bari Tarzan Mathisabayata (2008)
- Wadda Khan (1983)
- Wade (2020)
- Wadjah Seorang Laki-laki (1971)
- Wadjda (2012)
- Wafa: A Deadly Love Story (2008)
- Wafadaar (1985)
- Waffle Street (2015)

==== Wag–Wah ====
- Wag the Dog (1997)
- Wag Kang Lilingon (2006)
- Waga Koi wa Moenu (1949)
- Wagah (2016)
- The Wager: (1998 & 2007)
- A Wager Between Two Magicians, or Jealous of Myself (1904)
- The Wages of Fear (1953)
- The Wages of Sin: (1918, 1929 & 1938)
- Wages of Virtue (1924)
- Wages for Wives (1925)
- Waghoba: Provider, Destroyer, Deity (2016)
- Waging a Living (2005)
- Wagner's Dream (2012)
- Wagon Heels (1945)
- Wagon Master (1950)
- The Wagon Master (1929)
- The Wagon Show (1928)
- The Wagon and the Star (1936)
- Wagon Team (1952)
- Wagon Tracks (1919)
- Wagon Tracks West (1943)
- Wagon Train (1940)
- Wagon Wheels (1934)
- Wagon Wheels Westward (1945)
- Wagons East! (1994)
- Wagons West (1952)
- Wagons Westward (1940)
- Wah Do Dem (2009)
- Wah Taj (2016)
- Wah-Wah (2005)
- Wahan Ke Log (1967)
- Wahnfried (1986)

==== Wai–Waj ====
- The Waif and the Wizard (1901)
- Waikiki (1980)
- Waikiki Brothers (2001)
- Waikiki Wedding (1936)
- The Wailing (2016)
- Waisa Bhi Hota Hai Part II (2003)
- Waissman (2010 TV)
- Waist Deep (2006)
- The Wait: (2013 & 2015)
- Wait for Me (1943)
- Wait for Me and I Will Not Come (2009)
- Wait for Me in Heaven (1988)
- Wait and See (1928)
- Wait till the Sun Shines, Nellie (1952)
- Wait 'til This Year (2004)
- Wait till Your Mother Gets Home! (1983)
- Wait 'til You're Older (2005)
- Wait Till Helen Comes (2016)
- Wait Until Dark (1967)
- Wait Until Spring, Bandini (1989)
- Wait for Your Laugh (2017)
- Waiter (2006)
- Waiter! (1983)
- The Waiters' Ball (1916)
- The Waiters' Picnic (1913)
- Waiting: (1991, 2007 & 2015)
- Waiting... (2005)
- Waiting Alone (2005)
- Waiting for Armageddon (2009)
- Waiting for the Barbarians (2019)
- Waiting for Caroline (1969)
- Waiting at the Church (1906)
- The Waiting City (2010)
- Waiting to Exhale (1995)
- Waiting for Fidel (1974)
- Waiting for Forever (2011)
- The Waiting Game (1999)
- Waiting for Godik (2007)
- Waiting for Guffman (1996)
- Waiting for Happiness (2002)
- Waiting for the Light (1990)
- Waiting for Love (1981)
- Waiting for the Moon (1987)
- The Waiting Room: (2007, 2010, 2012 & 2015)
- Waiting at the Royal (2000)
- Waiting for Rain (2021)
- Waiting for Summer (2012)
- Waiting for "Superman" (2010)
- Waiting for Woody (1998)
- Waitress (2007)
- Waitress! (1981)
- Wajahh: A Reason to Kill (2004)
- Wajib (2017)
- Wajma (An Afghan Love Story) (2013)
- Wajood: (1998 & 2018)

==== Wak ====
- Wakamba! (1955)
- Wake: (2003, 2009 & cancelled)
- The Wake: (1986 & 2005)
- The Wake of Calum MacLeod (2006)
- Wake of Death (2004)
- The Wake of Dick Johnson (2016)
- Wake in Fright (1971)
- Wake Island (1942)
- Wake Me When It's Over (1960)
- Wake Me When the War Is Over (1969 TV)
- Wake Up Dead Man (2025)
- Wake Up and Die (1966)
- Wake Up and Dream: (1934 & 1946)
- Wake Up Famous (1937)
- Wake Up the Gypsy in Me (1933)
- Wake Up India (2013)
- Wake Island (1942)
- Wake Up Little Susie (1988)
- Wake Up and Live (1937)
- Wake Up Morocco (2006)
- A Wake in Providence (1999)
- Wake of the Red Witch (1948)
- Wake Up, Ron Burgundy: The Lost Movie (2004)
- Wake Up Sid (2009)
- Wake Up and Smell the Coffee (2001)
- Wake Wood (2009)
- Wakefield (2016)
- The Wakefield Case (1921)
- Wakeful Eyes (1956)
- The Wakhan Front (2015)
- Waking the Dead (2000)
- Waking Life (2001)
- Waking Madison (2011)
- Waking Ned Devine (1998)
- Waking Sleeping Beauty (2009)
- Waking Up the Nation (2002)
- Waking Up in Reno (2002)
- Waking Up the Town (1925)
- Wakko's Wish (1999)
- Wako (2015)

==== Wal–Wam ====
- Wal-Mart: The High Cost of Low Price (2005)
- Walden (1968)
- The Waldheim Waltz (2018)
- Waldo Salt: A Screenwriter's Journey (1990)
- Waldo's Last Stand (1940)
- Walesa: Man of Hope (2013)
- The Walk: (1953, 2001, & 2015)
- Walk All over Me (2007)
- A Walk Among the Tombstones (2014)
- Walk the Angry Beach (1968)
- Walk Away Renee (2011)
- A Walk to Beautiful (2007)
- A Walk in the Clouds (1995)
- Walk a Crooked Mile (1948)
- Walk a Crooked Path (1969)
- Walk the Dark Street (1956)
- Walk East on Beacon (1952)
- Walk Hard: The Dewey Cox Story (2007)
- Walk Into Paradise (1956)
- Walk Like a Dragon (1960)
- Walk Like a Man: (1987 & 2008)
- Walk the Line (2005)
- A Walk with Love and Death (1969)
- Walk with Me (2017)
- A Walk on the Moon (1999)
- Walk like a Panther (2018)
- Walk Proud (1979)
- Walk the Proud Land (1956)
- A Walk to Remember (2002)
- Walk of Shame (2014)
- Walk Softly, Stranger (1950)
- A Walk in the Spring Rain (1970)
- A Walk in the Sun: (1945 & 1978)
- Walk and Talk (2009)
- Walk the Talk (2001)
- Walk Tall (1960)
- Walk a Tightrope (1964)
- Walk the Walk (1970)
- Walk on Water (2004)
- Walk on the Wild Side (1962)
- A Walk in the Woods (2015)
- Walk, Don't Run (1966)
- Walk. Ride. Rodeo. (2019)
- The Walk-Offs (1920)
- Walkabout (1971)
- The Walker (2007)
- Walker (1987)
- Walker Payne (2006)
- Walking Across Egypt (1999)
- Walking on Air (1936)
- The Walking Dead: (1936 & 1995)
- Walking on Dead Fish (2008)
- The Walking Deceased (2015)
- Walking with Dinosaurs (2013)
- Walking the Edge (1985)
- Walking with the Enemy (2014)
- The Walking Hills (1949)
- Walking My Baby Back Home (1953)
- Walking Out (2017)
- Walking to Paris (TBD)
- The Walking Stick (1970)
- Walking on Sunshine (2014)
- Walking and Talking (1996)
- Walking Tall: (1973 & 2004)
- Walking Tall Part 2 (1975)
- Walking Tall: Final Chapter (1977)
- Walking Tall: Lone Justice (2007)
- Walking Tall: The Payback (2007)
- The Walking Target (1960)
- Walking on Water (2002)
- Walking to the Waterline (1998)
- Walky Talky Hawky (1946)
- The Wall: (1962, 1966, 1967, 1998 American, 1998 Belgian, 2011, 2012 & 2017)
- Wall of Noise (1963)
- Wall Street: (1929 & 1987)
- Wall Street: Money Never Sleeps (2010)
- Wall Street Cowboy (1939)
- The Wall Street Whiz (1925)
- The Wall That Heals (1997)
- Wallace & Gromit series:
  - Wallace & Gromit in The Wrong Trousers (1993)
  - Wallace & Gromit: The Best of Aardman Animation (1996)
  - Wallace & Gromit: The Curse of the Were-Rabbit (2005)
  - Wallace & Gromit: Vengeance Most Fowl (2024)
- Walled In (2009)
- Wallflower (1948)
- Wallflowers (1928)
- Wallis & Edward (2005)
- Walls (1984)
- The Walls Came Tumbling Down (1946)
- Walls of Fire (1971)
- Walls of Glass (1985)
- Walls of Gold (1933)
- The Walls of Hell (1964)
- The Walls of Jericho: (1914 & 1948)
- The Walls of Malapaga (1949)
- Walls of Prejudice (1920)
- Walls of Sand (1994)
- Walt Before Mickey (2015)
- Walt & El Grupo (2008)
- Walter: (1982 & 2015)
- Walter Wanger's Vogues of 1938 (1937)
- Waltz Across Texas (1982)
- Waltz with Bashir (2008)
- Waltz Time: (1933 & 1945)
- Waltz of the Toreadors (1962)
- Waltzes from Vienna (1933)
- Waltzing Matilda (1933)
- Waltzing Tilda (2017)
- Wamba, a Child of the Jungle (1913)
- Wamaq Azra (1946)

==== Wan ====
- Wan Pipel (1976)
- Wanda (1970)
- Wanda Nevada (1979)
- Wander Darkly (2020)
- The Wanderer: (1913, 1925, & 1967)
- Wanderer of the Wasteland: (1924, 1935 & 1945)
- Wanderers (2014)
- The Wanderers: (1956, 1973 & 1979)
- Wandering Daughters (1923)
- The Wandering Earth (2019)
- The Wandering Earth 2 (2023)
- Wandering Fires (1925)
- Wandering Footsteps (1925)
- Wandering Ginza Butterfly (1972)
- Wandering Ginza Butterfly 2: She-Cat Gambler (1972)
- Wandering Girl (2018)
- Wandering Girls (1927)
- The Wandering Guitarist (1959)
- Wandering Husbands (1924)
- The Wandering Jew: (1923 & 1933)
- Wandering with the Moon (1945)
- Wandering Papas (1926)
- Wandering Shadows (2004)
- The Wandering Soap Opera (2017)
- Wandering Souls (1921)
- Wandering Streams (2010)
- The Wandering Swordsman (1970)
- Wanderlust: (2006 & 2012)
- Wanee & Junah (2001)
- Wangan Midnight: The Movie (2009)
- Wannabe (2005)
- The Wannabes (2003)
- Wanpaku Ōji no Orochi Taiji (1963)
- Want So Much To Believe (1971)
- Wanted: (1967, 2008, 2009, 2010, 2011, & 2015)
- Wanted! (1937)
- Wanted! Jane Turner (1936)
- Wanted: Babysitter (1975)
- Wanted: Dead or Alive: (1984 & 1987)

==== Wap–Waq ====
- Wapakman (2009)
- Waqt (1965)
- Waqt: The Race Against Time (2005)
- Waqt Hamara Hai (1993)
- Waqt Ka Badshah (1992)
- Waqt Ki Awaz (1988)
- Waqt Ki Deewar (1981)
- Waqt Ki Pukar (1984)

==== War ====
- War: (2002, 2007, 2014 & 2019)
- The War: (1994 & 2007)
- The War Against Mrs. Hadley (1942)
- War Arrow (1953)
- War Art with Eddie Redmayne (2015)
- War Babies (1932)
- The War Between Men and Women (1972)
- War Book (2014)
- The War Boys (2009)
- The War Bride (2001)
- War Brides (1916)
- The War on Britain's Jews? (2007)
- War of the Buttons: (1962 & 1994)
- War Chhod Na Yaar (2013)
- A War of Children (1972 TV)
- War of the Colossal Beast (1958)
- War Comes to America (1945)
- War Correspondent (1932)
- War Crimes (2005)
- War/Dance (2007)
- War of the Dead (2011)
- The War on Democracy (2007)
- War Department Report (1943)
- War Devils (1969)
- War Dogs: (1942, 1943 & 2016)
- War Drums (1957)
- War Eagle, Arkansas (2007)
- War on Everyone (2016)
- War Flowers (2012)
- The War Game (1965 TV)
- War Games: At the End of the Day (2011)
- The War of the Gargantuas (1966)
- War Goddess (1973)
- War Gods of Babylon (1962)
- The War with Grandpa (2020)
- The War at Home: (1979 & 1996)
- War Horse (2011)
- The War Horse (1927)
- War Hunt (1962)
- War Is Hell (1961)
- The War on Kids (2009)
- The War Lord (1965)
- War and Love (1985)
- The War Lover (1962)
- War Machine: (2017 & 2026)
- War Made Easy: How Presidents & Pundits Keep Spinning Us to Death (2007)
- The War for Men's Minds (1943)
- War Nurse (1930)
- The War Is Over: (1945 & 1966)
- War Paint: (1926 & 1953)
- War Party: (1965 & 1988)
- War and Peace: (1956, 1966–67 & 2002)
- War and Pieces (1964)
- War Pigs (2015)
- War Photographer (2001)
- War for the Planet of the Apes (2017)
- War Requiem (1989)
- War Room (2015)
- The War Room (1993)
- The War of the Roses (1989)
- War of the Satellites (1958)
- The War in Space (1977)
- War Story: (1989 & 2014)
- A War Story (1981)
- War on a String (2015)
- The War Tapes (2006)
- War on Terror (2011)
- The War Wagon (1967)
- War on Whistleblowers: Free Press and the National Security State (2013)
- The War Widow (1976 TV)
- War Witch (2012)
- The War Within (2005)
- War Wolves (2009)
- War of the Worlds: (2005 & 2025)
- The War of the Worlds (1953)
- War of the Worlds 2: The Next Wave (2008)
- War of the Worlds – The True Story (2012)
- War of the Worlds: Goliath (2012)
- The War of the Worlds: Next Century (1983)
- The War You Don't See (2010)
- War Zone (1998)
- The War Zone (1999)
- War, Inc. (2008)
- War, Love, God, & Madness (2008)
- War-Gods of the Deep (1965)
- Warbus (1985)
- Warchild (2006)
- Warclouds in the Pacific (1941)
- Warcraft (2016)
- The Ward (2010)
- Ward No. 6 (2009)
- Wardriver (2026)
- The Ware Case: (1917, 1928 & 1938)
- Warfare (2025)
- WarGames (1983)
- WarGames: The Dead Code (2008)
- Warhead (1977)
- Warhorse One (2023)
- Warkill (1968)
- Warlock: (1959 & 1989)
- Warlock: The Armageddon (1993)
- Warlock III: The End of Innocence (1999)
- Warlock Moon (1973)
- The Warlord: Battle for the Galaxy (1998 TV)
- The Warlords (2007)
- Warlords of Atlantis (1978)
- Warm Bodies (2013)
- A Warm Corner (1930)
- A Warm December (1973)
- Warm Nights on a Slow Moving Train (1988)
- Warm Spring (2002)
- Warm Springs (2005)
- Warm Water Under a Red Bridge (2001)
- Warming Up (1983)
- Warn London (1934)
- Warn That Man (1943)
- Warned Off (1930)
- Warning: (1946, 2013, 2015 & 2021)
- The Warning: (1927, 1928, 1980, 2015 & 2018)
- Warning Shot: (1967 & 2018)
- Warning Sign (1985)
- Warning from Space (1956)
- Warning to Wantons (1949)
- Warning: Parental Advisory (2002)
- Warpath (1951)
- Warren Beatty: Mister Hollywood (2015)
- The Warren Case (1934)
- Warren Ellis: Captured Ghosts (2011)
- Warrendale (1967)
- The Warrens of Virginia: (1915 & 1924)
- Warrior: (2007 & 2011)
- The Warrior (2015)
- Warrior Champions: From Baghdad to Beijing (2009)
- The Warrior Class (2007)
- Warrior King (2006)
- Warrior of the Lost World (1983)
- The Warrior and the Sorceress (1984)
- The Warrior Strain (1919)
- The Warrior and the Wolf (2009)
- Warrior's End (2009)
- The Warriors Gate (2016)
- A Warrior's Heart (2011)
- The Warrior's Husband (1933)
- The Warrior's Way (2010)
- The Warriors (1979)
- Warriors of the Apocalypse: (1985 & 2009)
- Warriors of Faith (1947)
- Warriors Five (1960)
- Warriors of Future (2022)
- The Warriors Gate (2016)
- Warriors of Heaven and Earth (2004)
- Warriors of Virtue (1997)
- Warriors of Virtue: The Return to Tao (2002)
- Warriors of the Wasteland (1983)
- Warsaw 44 (2014)
- Warsaw Premiere (1951)
- Wartime Nutrition (1943)

==== Was ====
- Was He a Coward? (1911)
- Was She Guilty? (1922)
- Was She Justified? (1922)
- Was wäre, wenn...? (1960)
- Wasabi (2001)
- Wasabi Tuna (2003)
- Wasana (1976)
- Waseskun (2016)
- The Wash: (1988 & 2001)
- Wash Me in the River (2022)
- Washed Out (1995)
- Washee Ironee (1934)
- Washi to Taka (1957)
- Washington Heights (2002)
- The Washington Masquerade (1932)
- Washington Melodrama (1941)
- Washington Merry-Go-Round (1932)
- Washington Square (1997)
- Washington Story (1952)
- Wasp: (2003 & 2015)
- Wasp Network (2019)
- Wasp Wings (1945)
- The Wasp Woman: (1959 & 1995)
- Wassanaye Sanda (2018)
- Wassane Senehasa (2012)
- Wassup Rockers (2006)
- The Wasted Times (2016)
- Wasteland (2013)
- The Wasting (2017)
- Wasting Away (2007)
- The Wastrel (1961)

==== Wat ====
- Wat's Pig (1996)
- Watch (2001)
- The Watch (2012)
- Watch Beverly (1932)
- Watch the Birdie: (1950 & 1958)
- Watch Horror Films, Keep America Strong! (2008)
- Watch It (1993)
- Watch Out (2008)
- Watch Out, We're Mad (1976)
- Watch on the Rhine (1943)
- Watch it, Sailor! (1961)
- Watch the Shadows Dance (1987)
- Watch Your Stern (1960)
- Watch Your Wife (1926)
- Watcher (2022)
- The Watcher: (2000 & 2016)
- The Watcher in the Woods: (1980 & 2017)
- Watchers series:
  - Watchers (1988)
  - Watchers II (1990)
  - Watchers 3 (1994)
  - Watchers Reborn (1998)
- Watchers of the Sky (2014)
- The Watchers (2024)
- Watchhouse in the Carpathians (1914)
- Watching the Detectives (2007)
- Watchmen (2009)
- Watchtower (2001)
- Water: (1985 & 2005)
- The Water: (2009 & 2022)
- The Water Babies (1978)
- Water Birds (1952)
- Water Boyy (2015)
- The Water Diviner (2014)
- Water Drops on Burning Rocks (2000)
- Water for Elephants (2011)
- The Water Engine (1992 TV)
- The Water Gipsies (1932)
- The Water Horse: Legend of the Deep (2007)
- Water Lady (1979)
- Water Lilies (2007)
- The Water Lily (1919)
- Water Ritual 1: An Urban Rite of Purification (1979)
- Water Rustlers (1939)
- Water on the Table (2010)
- Water, Water Every Hare (1952)
- Water, Water, Everywhere (1920)
- Water's Journey: The Hidden Rivers of Florida (2003)
- Waterbomb for the Fat Tomcat (2004)
- Waterborne (2005)
- The Waterboy (1998)
- Waterboys (2001)
- The Watercolor (2009)
- Watercolor Painting in a Rainy Day (1989)
- Watercolor Painting in a Rainy Day 2 (1993)
- Watercolor Postcards (2012)
- Watercolors (2008)
- The Waterdance (1992)
- Waterfront: (1939, 1944 & 1950)
- Waterfront Lady (1935)
- Waterfront at Midnight (1948)
- Waterhole No. 3 (1967)
- Waterland (1992)
- Waterlife (2009)
- Waterlily Jaguar (2018)
- Waterloo: (1929 & 1970)
- Waterloo Bridge: (1931 & 1940)
- Waterloo Road (1945)
- Watermarks (2004)
- Watermelon (2003)
- The Watermelon (2008)
- Watermelon Man (1970)
- The Watermelon Woman (1996)
- Waterproof (2000)
- Watership Down (1978)
- Waterwalker (1984)
- Waterworld (1995)
- Wattstax (1973)
- Watusi (1959)

==== Wav–Waz ====
- The Wave: (1981, 2008, 2015 & 2019)
- Wave Twisters (2001)
- A Wave, a WAC and a Marine (1944)
- Wavelength: (1967 & 1983)
- Waveriders (2008)
- Waves (2019)
- Waves of Fate (1918)
- Waves of Life and Love (1921)
- Waves of Lust (1975)
- Waves for Water (2017)
- Wax: or the Discovery of Television Among the Bees (1991)
- Wax Mask (1997)
- The Wax Model (1917)
- Wax Works (1934)
- Waxie Moon in Fallen Jewel (2011)
- Waxwork (1988)
- Waxwork II: Lost in Time (1992)
- Waxworks (1924)
- The Way: (2010 & 2017)
- The Way Ahead (1944)
- The Way of All Flesh (1927)
- The Way of All Men (1930)
- The Way Back: (2010 & 2020)
- Way Back Home: (1931, 2011 & 2013)
- Way Down East: (1920 & 1935)
- Way Down South (1939)
- The Way of the Dragon (1972)
- Way of a Gaucho (1952)
- The Way to the Gold (1957)
- The Way of the Gun (2000)
- The Way Home: (2002, 2010 American, & 2010 Indian)
- The Way I See It (2020)
- The Way It Is (1985)
- A Way of Life: (2004 & 2016)
- The Way of Lost Souls (1929)
- The Way to Love (1933)
- The Way of a Man with a Maid (1918)
- Way Out (1967)
- Way Out West: (1930 & 1937)
- A Way Out of the Wilderness (1968)
- The Way of Peace (1947)
- Way for a Sailor (1930)
- The Way to the Sea (1936)
- The Way to the Stars (1945)
- The Way of the Strong (1919)
- Way Up Thar (1935)
- The Way of War (2009)
- The Way Way Back (2013)
- The Way We Get By (2009)
- The Way We Live Now (1970)
- The Way We Were (1973)
- The Way West (1967)
- The Way of the West (1934)
- Way of the Wicked (2014)
- The Way of the Wind (TBD)
- The Way of the World: (1916 & 1920)
- The Way of Youth (1934)
- Way...Way Out (1966)
- waydowntown (2000)
- Wayne's World (1992)
- Wayne's World 2 (1993)
- Ways to Live Forever (2010)
- Wayward (1932)
- The Wayward Bus (1957)
- The Wayward Cloud (2005)
- The Wayward Girl (1957)
- Wayward Son (1999)
- Waza no Tabibito (2011)
- Wazir (2016)
- Le Wazzou polygame (1971)

=== We ===
- We: (1982, 2018 & 2022)
- We All Die Alone (2021)
- We All Fall Down: (1997 & 2000)
- We All Loved Each Other So Much (1974)
- We the Animals (2018)
- We Are All Demons (1969)
- We Are All Murderers (1952)
- We Are All in Temporary Liberty (1971)
- We Are the Best! (2013)
- We Are Brothers (2014)
- We Are Dad (2005)
- We Are the Faithful (2005)
- We Are Family: (2010 & 2016)
- We Are the Flesh (2016)
- We Are the Freaks (2013)
- We Are the Giant (2014)
- We Are Gold (2019)
- We Are the Heat (2018)
- The We and the I (2012)
- We Are from Jazz (1983)
- We Are Kings (2014)
- We Are the Lambeth Boys (1959)
- We Are Legion (2012)
- We Are Little Zombies (2019)
- We Are Many (2014)
- We Are the Marines (1942)
- We Are Marshall (2006)
- We Are Never Alone (2016)
- We Are the Night (2010)
- We Are No Angels (1975)
- We Are Northern Lights (2013)
- We Are Not Angels (1992)
- We Are Not Angels 3: Rock & Roll Strike Back (2006)
- We Are Not Children (1934)
- We Are Not Married (1946)
- We Are Not Alone: (1939 & 1993)
- We Are the Others (2017)
- We Are the People We've Been Waiting For (2009)
- We Are Poets (2011)
- We Are Still Here: (2015 & 2022)
- We Are the Strange (2007)
- We Are Together (2006)
- We Are Twisted Fucking Sister! (2014)
- We Are What We Are: (2010 & 2013)
- We Are X (2016)
- We Are Young. We Are Strong (2014)
- We Are Your Friends (2015)
- We Believe: Chicago and Its Cubs (2009)
- We Believed (2010)
- We Belong to the Imperial-Royal Infantry Regiment (1926)
- We Bought a Zoo (2011)
- We Bury the Dead (2025)
- We Can't Change the World. But, We Wanna Build a School in Cambodia. (2011)
- We Can't Go Home Again (1973)
- We Can't Have Everything (1918)
- We Can't Live Without Cosmos (2015)
- We Can't Make the Same Mistake Twice (2016)
- We Cellar Children (1960)
- We Come During Spring (1953)
- We Come as Friends (2014)
- We Danced Around the World (1939)
- We Did It (1936)
- We Dive at Dawn (1943)
- We Do (2015)
- We Don't Belong Here (2017)
- We Don't Live Here Anymore (2004)
- We Dreamed America (2008)
- We Faw Down (1928)
- We Feed the World (2005)
- We Forgot to Break Up (2017)
- We Forgot to Break Up (2024)
- We Free Kings (1996)
- We Go Fast (1941)
- We Go Way Back (2006)
- We Have Always Lived in the Castle (2018)
- We Have to Marry Them Off (1953)
- We Have Only One Life (1958)
- We Have Our Moments (1937)
- We Have a Pope (2011)
- We Iraqis (2004)
- We Jam Econo (2005)
- We Joined the Navy (1962)
- We Live Again (1934)
- We Live in Public (2009)
- We Live in Time (2024)
- We Live In Two Worlds (1937)
- We Lived for Estonia (1997)
- We the Living (1942)
- We Love You, Sally Carmichael (2017)
- We Maids (1951)
- We Make Movies (2016)
- We Make Music (1942)
- We Married Margo (2000)
- We Meet at Tove's (1946)
- We Moderns (1925)
- We Monsters (2015)
- We Must Do Our Best (1909)
- We Need to Do Something (2021)
- We Need to Talk About Kevin (2011)
- We Need to Talk about Dad (2011)
- We Never Die (1993)
- We of the Never Never (1982)
- We Never Sleep (1917)
- We Not Naughty (2012)
- We and Our Mountains (1969)
- We Own the Night (2007)
- We the Party (2012)
- We Ride: The Story of Snowboarding (2013)
- We Shall Overcome (2006)
- We Shall Return (1963)
- We Shall See (1964)
- We Steal Secrets: The Story of WikiLeaks (2013)
- We Stick Together Through Thick and Thin (1929)
- We Still Kill the Old Way: (1967 & 2014)
- We Summon the Darkness (2019)
- We Thieves Are Honourable: (1942 & 1956)
- We Think the World of You (1988)
- We Three Debutantes (1953)
- We Too Walked on the Moon (2009)
- We Two Alone (1952)
- We from the Urals (1944)
- We Want a Child! (1949)
- We Want the Colonels (1973)
- We Want Our Mummy (1939)
- We Went to College (1936)
- We Were Children (2012)
- We Were Dancing (1942)
- We Were Here (2011)
- We Were the Mulvaneys (2002)
- We Were Once a Fairytale (2009)
- We Were Seven Sisters (1939)
- We Were Seven Widows (1939)
- We Were So Beloved (1985)
- We Were Soldiers (2002)
- We Were Strangers (1949)
- We Were Wolves (2014)
- We Were Young (1961)
- We Who Are About to Die (1937)
- We Who Are Young (1940)
- We Who Go the Kitchen Route (1953)
- We Will All Go to Paris (1950)
- We Will Be the World Champions (2015)
- We Will Go to Deauville (1962)
- We Women (1925)
- We Won't Grow Old Together (1972)
- We Work Again (1937)
- We, the Animals Squeak! (1941)
- We, the Women (1953)
- We'll Live Till Monday (1968)
- We'll Meet Again: (1943 & 2002)
- We'll Meet Again in the Heimat (1926)
- We'll Never Have Paris (2014)
- We'll Really Hurt You (1998)
- We'll Smile Again (1942)
- We'll Take Care of the Teachers (1970)
- We'll Take Her Children in Amongst Our Own (1915)
- We'll Take Manhattan: (1990 & 2012)
- We'll Talk About Love Later (1953)
- We're All Christs (2006)
- We're All Gamblers (1927)
- We're All Going to the World's Fair (2021)
- We're All Necessary (1956)
- We're Back! A Dinosaur's Story (1993)
- We're Dancing on the Rainbow (1952)
- We're Going to Be Rich (1938)
- We're Going to Eat You (1980)
- We're Going Separate Ways (1957)
- We're Here to Help (2007)
- We're on the Jury (1937)
- We're in the Legion Now! (1936)
- We're Livin' on Dog Food (2009)
- We're the Millers (2013)
- We're in the Money (1935)
- We're in the Navy Now (1926)
- We're No Angels: (1955 & 1989)
- We're No Bad Guys (1997)
- We're No Monks (2004)
- We're Not Dressing (1934)
- We're Not Married! (1952)
- We're Only Human (1935)
- We're Rich Again (1934)
- We're Talking Serious Money (1991)
- We've Never Been Licked (1943)

==== Wea–Web ====
- The Weak-End Party (1922)
- Weak Spot (1975)
- The Weak and the Wicked (1954)
- A Weak Woman (1933)
- The Weaker Sex: (1917, 1933 & 1948)
- The Weakly Reporter (1944)
- The Weakness of the Bolshevik (2003)
- The Weakness of Man (1916)
- The Weakness of Strength (1916)
- Wealth (1921)
- Wealth Without a Future (1939)
- The Weapon (1956)
- The Weapon, the Hour & the Motive (1972)
- WEAPONS (2007)
- Weapons (2025)
- Weapons of Death (1977)
- Weapons of Mass Distraction (1997)
- The Weapons of Youth (1913)
- The Wearing of the Grin (1951)
- Wearing Velvet Slippers under a Golden Umbrella (1970)
- Weary River (1929)
- A Weary Road (1956)
- Weary Willies (1929)
- Weary Willie's Rags (1914)
- Weasel Stop (1955)
- Weasel While You Work (1958)
- Weather Girl (2009)
- Weather Is Good on Deribasovskaya, It Rains Again on Brighton Beach (1992)
- The Weather Man (2005)
- The Weather Station (1923)
- The Weather Underground (2002)
- Weathering with You (2019)
- The Weatherman and the Shadowboxer (2014)
- A Weaver of Dreams (1918)
- The Weavers: (1905 & 1927)
- Weavers of Fortune (1922)
- The Weavers of Nishijin (1961)
- The Weavers: Wasn't That a Time! (1982)
- Weaving Girl (2009)
- Web (2013)
- The Web (1947)
- Web of Danger (1947)
- The Web of Deceit (1920)
- Web of Deception (1994 TV)
- The Web of Desire (1917)
- Web of Fate (1927)
- Web Junkie (2013)
- Web of Love (1998)
- Web of Passion (1959)
- Web of the Spider (1971)
- Web of Suspicion (1959)
- Webmaster (1998)
- Webs (2003)
- The Webster Boy (1962)

==== Wed ====
- Weda Beri Tarzan (2007)
- Weddad (1936)
- A Wedding: (1978 & 2016)
- The Wedding: (1944, 1972, 2000, 2004, 2018 & 2021)
- Wedding Anniversary (2017)
- The Wedding Banquet (1993 & 2025)
- Wedding in Barenhof (1942)
- Wedding Bell Blues (1996)
- A Wedding for Bella (2001)
- Wedding Bells: (1921, 1933 & 1954)
- Wedding in Bessarabia (2009)
- Wedding Bills (1927)
- Wedding in Blood (1973)
- The Wedding Camels (1980)
- Wedding Campaign (2005)
- The Wedding Chest (2006)
- Wedding Crashers (2005)
- The Wedding Date (2005)
- Wedding Day (1942)
- Wedding Days (2002)
- Wedding Daze: (2004 TV & 2006)
- The Wedding Director (2006)
- Wedding Doll (2015)
- A Wedding in the Dream (1948)
- Wedding Dress (2010)
- Wedding with Erika (1950)
- Wedding in Galilee (1987)
- The Wedding Game (2009)
- Wedding Group (1936)
- The Wedding Guest: (1916 & 2018)
- The Wedding Hotel (1944)
- A Wedding Invitation (2013)
- Wedding at Lake Wolfgang (1933)
- The Wedding of Lilli Marlene (1953)
- The Wedding Maidens (1990)
- Wedding in Malinovka (1967)
- The Wedding March: (1915, 1928, 1929, 1934 & 2016)
- Wedding Night (2001)
- The Wedding Night (1935)
- Wedding Night – End of the Song (1992)
- Wedding Night in Paradise: (1950 & 1962)
- Wedding in Paris (2011)
- The Wedding Party: (1969 & 2016)
- The Wedding Party 2 (2017)
- The Wedding Planner (2001)
- Wedding Present (1936)
- Wedding Pullav (2015)
- Wedding Rehearsal (1932)
- The Wedding Ringer (2015)
- Wedding Rings (1929)
- Wedding of Silence (2004)
- The Wedding Singer (1998)
- The Wedding Song (1917)
- A Wedding Suit (1976)
- The Wedding Tackle (2000)
- Wedding Tayo, Wedding Hindi (2011)
- Wedding in Transit (1953)
- The Wedding Video: (2003 & 2012)
- Wedding Wars (2006)
- Wedding in White (1972)
- Wedding Worries (1941)
- The Wedding Year (2019)
- Weddings and Babies (1960)
- Weddings Are Wonderful (1938)
- Wedlock (1991)
- Wedlock Deadlock (1947)
- A Wednesday! (2008)
- Wednesday, May 9 (2015)
- Wednesday's Child (1934)
- Wednesday's Luck (1936)

==== Wee–Weh ====
- Wee Lady Betty (1917)
- Wee MacGregor's Sweetheart (1922)
- The Wee Man (2013)
- Wee Wee Monsieur (1938)
- Wee Willie Winkie (1937)
- Wee-Willie Wildcat (1953)
- Weeds: (1987 & 2017)
- Weeds on Fire (2016)
- Week End Husbands (1924)
- Week Ends Only (1932)
- The Week Of (2018)
- The Week of the Sphinx (1990)
- Week-end (1935)
- Le Week-End (2013)
- The Week-End (1920)
- Week-End with Father (1951)
- Week-End in Havana (1941)
- Week-End Marriage (1932)
- Week-End Pass (1944)
- Week-End for Three (1941)
- Week-End at the Waldorf (1945)
- A Week's Vacation (1980)
- Weekend: (1967, 2010 & 2011)
- The Weekend: (2016 & 2018)
- Weekend at Bernie's (1989)
- Weekend at Bernie's II (1993)
- The Weekend Bride (1928)
- Weekend of a Champion (1972)
- Weekend at Dunkirk (1964)
- Weekend Getaway (2012)
- Weekend, Italian Style (1966)
- Weekend with Kate (1990)
- Weekend Lover (1995)
- A Weekend with Lulu (1961)
- Weekend Magic (1927)
- Weekend with my Mother (2009)
- The Weekend Murders (1970)
- The Weekend Nun (1972)
- Weekend in Paradise: (1931 & 1952)
- Weekend Pass (1984)
- Weekend of Shadows (1978)
- Weekend of Terror (1970 TV)
- Weekend War (1988 TV)
- Weekend Warriors (1986)
- Weekend Wives (1928)
- Weekender (2011)
- Weekends (2017)
- Weekends in Normandy (2014)
- Weenie Roast (1931)
- Weepah Way for Now (2015)
- Weeping for a Bandit (1964)
- Weeping Willow (2014)
- Weerawarna (2016)
- Weergevonden (1914)
- Wehe, wenn er losgelassen (1932)
- Wehshi Daku (1982)
- Wehshi Gujjar (1979)

==== Wei–Wek ====
- Weighed But Found Wanting (1974)
- The Weight: (2012 & 2026)
- The Weight of Chains (2010)
- The Weight of Chains 2 (2014)
- The Weight of Water (2000)
- Weil ich dich liebe... (1969)
- Weiner (2016)
- The Weird Doll (2016)
- Weird Science (1985)
- Weird Tales (1994)
- The Weird Villa (2004)
- Weird Woman (1944)
- The Weird World of Blowfly (2010)
- Weird: The Al Yankovic Story (2022)
- The Weirdo Hero (2015)
- Weirdos (2016)
- Weirdsville (2007)
- Weite Straßen – stille Liebe (1969)
- Weiße Wölfe (1969)
- Weißes Blut (1959)
- Wekande Walauwa (2002)

==== Wel ====
- Welcome: (1986, 2007 & 2009)
- Welcome to 18 (1986)
- Welcome 2 Ibiza (2002)
- Welcome 2 Karachi (2015)
- Welcome Aboard Toxic Airlines (2007)
- Welcome to Acapulco (2019)
- Welcome to Arrow Beach (1974)
- Welcome to Australia (1999)
- Welcome Back (2015)
- Welcome Back Gandhi (2014)
- Welcome Back, Mr. McDonald (1997)
- Welcome to Blood City (1977)
- Welcome to Canada (1989)
- Welcome to Central Jail (2016)
- Welcome to Chechnya (2020)
- Welcome to the Club (1971)
- Welcome to Collinwood (2002)
- Welcome to Curiosity (2018)
- Welcome Danger (1929)
- Welcome to the Dollhouse (1995)
- Welcome to Dongmakgol (2005)
- Welcome to Durham, USA (2007)
- Welcome to F.L. (2015)
- Welcome to Germany (2016)
- Welcome to Happiness (2015)
- Welcome to Hard Times (1967)
- Welcome to Hollywood (1998)
- Welcome Home: (1925, 1935, 1989, 2004, 2006 & 2018)
- Welcome Home Brother Charles (1975)
- Welcome to Home Gori (1990)
- Welcome Home Roscoe Jenkins (2008)
- Welcome Home, Bobby (1986 TV)
- Welcome Home, Johnny Bristol (1972 TV)
- Welcome Home, Roxy Carmichael (1990)
- Welcome Home, Soldier Boys (1972)
- Welcome to the Jungle: (2007 & 2013)
- Welcome to Kodaikanal (1992)
- Welcome to L.A. (1976)
- Welcome to London (2015)
- Welcome to Leith (2015)
- Welcome to Macintosh (2008)
- Welcome to Marwen (2018)
- Welcome to Me (2014)
- Welcome M1LL10NS (2018)
- Welcome to Mooseport (2004)
- Welcome Mr. Marshall! (1953)
- Welcome Mr. President (2013)
- Welcome, Mr. Washington (1944)
- Welcome to My Nightmare (1976)
- Welcome to New York: (2012, 2014 & 2018)
- Welcome to Nollywood (2007)
- Welcome Obama (2013)
- Welcome to Pine Hill (2012)
- Welcome to the Punch (2013)
- Welcome to Pyongyang Animal Park (2001)
- Welcome to the Quiet Room (2007)
- Welcome, Reverend! (1950)
- Welcome to the Rileys (2010)
- Welcome to the Roses (2003)
- Welcome to Sajjanpur (2008)
- Welcome to Sarajevo (1997)
- Welcome to Shama Town (2010)
- Welcome to the Space Show (2010)
- Welcome to the Sticks (2008)
- Welcome Stranger: (1924 & 1947)
- Welcome the Stranger (2018)
- Welcome to Switzerland (2004)
- Welcome in Vienna (1986)
- Welcome to Willits (2016)
- Welcome to Wonderland (2006)
- Welcome to Woop Woop (1997)
- Welcome Zindagi (2015)
- Welcome, or No Trespassing (1964)
- Weli Pawuru (2019)
- Welikathara (1971)
- Well (2016)
- The Well: (1951 & 2015)
- The Well-Digger's Daughter: (1940 & 2011)
- Well Done: (2003 & 2016)
- Well Done Abba (2009)
- Well Done, Henry (1936)
- Well-Founded Fear (2000)
- The Well Groomed Bride (1946)
- Well Oiled (1947)
- Well Wishes (2015)
- Well Worn Daffy (1965)
- Wellman (2003)
- Wells Fargo (1937)
- Wells Fargo Gunmaster (1951)
- Wells in Flames (1937)
- Wellwood (TBD)
- A Welsh Singer (1915)

==== Wen–Wer ====
- Wend Kuuni (1982)
- The Wendell Baker Story (2005)
- Wendell & Wild (2022)
- Wendigo (2001)
- Wendy (2020)
- Wendy Cracked a Walnut (1990)
- Wendy and Lucy (2009)
- Wendy Wu: Homecoming Warrior (2006)
- Wenn Ludwig ins Manöver zieht (1967)
- Went to Coney Island on a Mission from God... Be Back by Five (1998)
- Went the Day Well? (1942)
- Went Up the Hill (2024)
- Wer (2013)
- Wer seine Frau lieb hat (1955)
- Werckmeister Harmonies (2000)
- Were the World Mine (2008)
- The Werewolf: (1913 & 1956)
- Werewolf: (1996 & 2016)
- A Werewolf Boy (2012)
- Werewolf Game (2025)
- Werewolf in a Girls' Dormitory (1961)
- Werewolf of London (1935)
- Werewolf by Night (2022)
- Werewolf Rising (2014)
- The Werewolf of Washington (1973)
- Werewolf Woman (1976)
- The Werewolf of Woodstock (1975)
- Werewolf: The Beast Among Us (2012)
- Werewolves (2024)
- Werewolves of the Third Reich (2017)
- Werewolves on Wheels (1971)
- Werewolves Within (2021)
- Werner – Beinhart! (1990)
- Werner Herzog Eats His Shoe (1980)
- Werther: (1927 & 1986)

==== Wes ====
- Wes Craven's Chiller (1985)
- Wes Craven's New Nightmare (1994)
- Wesley (2009)
- The Wesley's Mysterious File (2002)
- The West: (1938 & 1996)
- West: (2007 & 2013)
- West 32nd (2007)
- West 47th Street (2003)
- West of the Alamo (1946)
- West Beirut (1998)
- West of the Brazos (1950)
- West of Broadway: (1926 & 1931)
- West of Carson City (1940)
- West of Cimarron (1941)
- West of the Divide (1934)
- West of Hot Dog (1924)
- A West Lake Moment (2005)
- West of Memphis (2012)
- West of Nevada (1936)
- West of the Pecos: (1934 & 1945)
- West of the Pesos (1960)
- West Point (1928)
- The West Point Story (1950)
- West Point Widow (1941)
- West of the Rio Grande (1944)
- West of Santa Fe (1928)
- West of the Santa Fe (1938)
- West of Shanghai (1937)
- The West Side Kid (1943)
- West Side Story: (1961 & 2021)
- West of Singapore (1933)
- West and Soda (1965)
- West of Suez (1957)
- West of Thunder (2012)
- West of Tombstone (1942)
- West of the Water Tower (1923)
- West of Wyoming (1950)
- West of Zanzibar: (1928 & 1954)
- Westbound (1959)
- Westbound Mail (1937)
- Western: (1997 & 2017)
- Western Approaches (1944)
- Western Blood (1918)
- The Western Code (1932)
- Western Cyclone (1943)
- The Western Front (2010)
- Western Gold (1937)
- Western Heritage (1948)
- Western Jamboree (1938)
- Western Justice (1934)
- Western Limited (1932)
- Western Luck (1924)
- Western Mail (1942)
- Western Religion (2015)
- Western Trails (1938)
- Western Union (1941)
- The Western Wallop (1924)
- Western Whoopee (1930)
- The Western Whirlwind (1927)
- The Westerner: (1934 & 1940)
- The Westerner and the Earl (1911)
- Westerplatte (1967)
- Westfront 1918 (1930)
- Westinghouse Works, 1904 (1904)
- The Westland Case (1937)
- Westward Ho: (1935 & 1942)
- Westward Ho!: (1919 & 1940)
- Westward Ho the Wagons! (1952)
- Westward Passage (1932)
- Westward Whoa (1936)
- Westward the Women (1951)
- Westway to the World (2000)
- Westwind (2011)
- Westworld (1973)
- The West~Bound Limited (1923)

==== Wet–Wex ====
- Wet Blanket Policy (1948)
- Wet Dreams (2002)
- Wet Dreams 2 (2005)
- Wet Gold: (1921 & 1984)
- Wet Hare (1962)
- Wet Hot American Summer (2001)
- A Wet Knight (1932)
- Wet Paint: (1926 & 1946)
- The Wet Parade (1932)
- Wet Weekend (1979)
- Wetback: The Undocumented Documentary (2005)
- The Wetback Hound (1957)
- Wetherby (1985)
- Wetlands: (2011, 2013 & 2017)
- Wetware (2018)
- Wexford Plaza (2016)

=== Wh ===
==== Wha ====
- Whale (1970)
- The Whale: (2011, 2013 TV & 2022)
- Whale Music (1994)
- Whale Rider (2003)
- Whalefall (2026)
- Whalers (1939)
- Whale Shark Jack (2026)
- The Whales of August (1987)
- Wham Bam Slam (1955)
- Wham! (2023)
- Wham! Bam! Islam! (2011)
- Wham! in China: Foreign Skies (1986)
- Wharf Angel (1934)
- Wharf of Windows (2000)
- What About Bob? (1991)
- What About Love (2024)
- What Became of Jack and Jill? (1972)
- What Becomes of the Broken Hearted? (1999)
- What Becomes of the Children?: (1918 & 1936)
- What the Bleep Do We Know!? (2004)
- What the Daisy Said (1910)
- What to Do in Case of Fire (2001)
- What Dreams May Come (1998)
- What Ever Happened to... (1991 TV)
- What Ever Happened to Aunt Alice? (1969)
- What Ever Happened to Baby Jane? (1962)
- What Ever Happened to Baby Toto (1964)
- What to Expect When You're Expecting (2012)
- What a Girl Wants (2003)
- What Happened to Mary (1912)
- What Happened Was (1994)
- What Happens in Vegas... (2008)
- What Have I Done to Deserve This? (1985)
- What Have You Done to Solange? (1975)
- What If? (2013)
- What Josiah Saw (2021)
- What Just Happened (2008)
- What Keeps You Alive (2018)
- What Lies Beneath (2000)
- What Lola Wants (2015)
- What Love Is (2006)
- What Maisie Knew (2013)
- What Men Want (2019)
- What a Night!: (1928 & 1931)
- What Planet Are You From? (2000)
- What Price Glory: (1926 & 1952)
- What Price Hollywood? (1932)
- What Richard Did (2012)
- What Time Is It There? (2001)
- What a Way to Go! (1964)
- What We Do in the Shadows (2014)
- What a Wife Learned (1923)
- What Women Want (2000)
- What a Wonderful Family! (2016)
- What You Mean We? (1987 TV)
- What You Wish For (2023)
- What! No Beer? (1933)
- What's Autumn? (1977)
- What's Bugging Seth (2005)
- What's Buzzin' Buzzard (1943)
- What's Cookin'? (1947)
- What's Cookin' Doc? (1944)
- What's Cooking? (2000)
- What's Eating Gilbert Grape (1993)
- What's Going On up There? (2006)
- What's Good for the Goose (1969)
- What's His Name (1914)
- What's Love Got to Do with It (1993)
- What's My Lion? (1961)
- What's New About Love? (2011)
- What's New Pussycat? (1965)
- What's a Nice Girl Like You...? (1971)
- What's a Nice Girl like You Doing in a Place like This? (1963)
- What's Opera, Doc? (1957)
- What's Sauce for the Goose (1916)
- What's So Bad About Feeling Good? (1968)
- What's Up with Love? (2002)
- What's Up Nurse! (1977)
- What's Up Superdoc! (1978)
- What's Up, Doc?: (1950 & 1972)
- What's Up, Tiger Lily? (1966)
- What's a Wife Worth? (1921)
- What's the Worst That Could Happen? (2001)
- What's Worth While? (1921)
- What's Wrong with Nanette? (1929)
- What's Wrong with the Women? (1922)
- What's Your Hurry? (1920)
- What's Your Husband Doing? (1920)
- What's Your Number? (2011)
- What's Your Raashee? (2009)
- What's Your Reputation Worth? (1921)
- What? (1972)
- Whatever Happened to Harold Smith? (1999)
- Whatever It Takes: (2000 & 2009 TV)
- Whatever Works (2009)

==== Whe ====
- Wheat (2009)
- The Wheel: (1925 & 2021)
- Wheel of Ashes (1968)
- Wheel of Chance (1928)
- Wheel of Fate (1953)
- Wheel of Fortune and Fantasy (2021)
- Wheel of Time (2003)
- Wheelman (2017)
- Wheels (1998)
- Wheels of Fire (1985)
- Wheels on Meals (1984)
- Wheels of Terror (1990 TV)
- When Abortion Was Illegal: Untold Stories (1992)
- When Ali Came to Ireland (2012)
- When AIDS Was Funny (2015)
- When Andrew Came Home (2000)
- When Angels Come to Town (2004 TV)
- When Angels Fall (1959)
- When Angels Fly (1983 TV)
- When Animals Dream (2014)
- When Asia Speaks (1944)
- When Bearcat Went Dry (1919)
- When Billie Beat Bobby (2001)
- When Björk Met Attenborough (2013)
- When Black Birds Fly (2015)
- When Boris Met Dave (2009)
- When the Bough Breaks: (1947, 1986 TV, 1994 & 2016)
- When Boys Fly (2002)
- When Brendan Met Trudy (2000)
- When the Cat's Away: (1929 & 1996)
- When China Met Africa (2010)
- When Danger Calls (1927)
- When Darkness Falls: (1960 & 2006)
- When Day Breaks (2012)
- When Dinosaurs Ruled the Earth (1971)
- When Do We Eat?: (1918 & 2005)
- When Eight Bells Toll (1971)
- When the Evening Bells Ring: (1930 & 1951)
- When Evening Falls on Bucharest or Metabolism (2013)
- When Father Was Away on Business (1985)
- When the Game Stands Tall (2014)
- When Harry Met Sally... (1989)
- When I Fall in Love... with Both (2000)
- When I'm Ready (2025)
- When Knighthood Was in Flower (1922)
- When Larry Met Mary (2016)
- When the Last Sword Is Drawn (2003)
- When Lincoln Paid (1913)
- When a Man Loves a Woman (1994)
- When a Man Sees Red: (1917 & 1934)
- When Marnie Was There (2014)
- When the Meteor Shot Across the Sky (2016)
- When Night Falls: (1985 & 2012)
- When Night Is Falling (1995)
- When in Rome: (1952, 2002 & 2010)
- When Saturday Comes (1996)
- When a Stranger Calls: (1979 & 2006)
- When a Stranger Calls Back (1993) (TV)
- When Strangers Marry: (1933 & 1944)
- When Taekwondo Strikes (1973)
- When Time Ran Out (1980)
- When the Trees Were Tall (1961)
- When Trumpets Fade (1998 TV)
- When We First Met (2018)
- When We Were Kings (1997)
- When Will I Be Loved (2004)
- When the Wind Blows: (1930 & 1986)
- When Wise Ducks Meet (1924)
- When a Woman Ascends the Stairs (1960)
- When Worlds Collide (1951)
- When You Finish Saving the World (2022)
- When You're in Love (1937)
- When's Your Birthday? (1937)
- Where Angels Fear to Tread (1991)
- Where Angels Go, Trouble Follows (1968)
- Where Are My Children? (1916)
- Where Are We Going, Dad? (2014)
- Where Are We Going, Dad? 2 (2015)
- Where the Boys Are (1960)
- Where the Boys Are '84 (1984)
- Where the Buffalo Roam (1980)
- Where the Crawdads Sing (2022)
- Where Danger Lives (1950)
- Where the Dead Go to Die (2012)
- Where Do We Go Now? (2011)
- Where Eagles Dare (1968)
- Where Eskimos Live (2002)
- Where the Green Ants Dream (1984)
- Where the Heart Is: (1990 & 2000)
- Where Is the Friend's Home? (1987)
- Where the Lilies Bloom (1974)
- Where the Money Is (2000)
- Where No Vultures Fly (1951)
- Where the Rivers Flow North (1993)
- Where the Sidewalk Ends (1950)
- Where There's Life (1947)
- Where There's a Will: (1936 & 1955)
- Where the Truth Lies (2005)
- Where the Wild Things Are (2009)
- Where'd You Go, Bernadette (2019)
- Where's the Dragon? (2015)

==== Whi ====
- Which Brings Me to You (2024)
- Which Is Witch (1948)
- Which Way to the Front? (1970)
- Which Way Is Up? (1977)
- Which Woman? (1918)
- Whichever Way the Ball Bounces (1974)
- While the Attorney Is Asleep (1945)
- While the Billy Boils (1921)
- While the Children Sleep (2007 TV)
- While the City Sleeps: (1928, 1950 & 1956)
- While the Door Was Locked (1946)
- While I Live (1947)
- While I Run This Race (1967)
- While I Was Gone (2004 TV)
- While Justice Waits (1922)
- While London Sleeps (1926)
- While Mexico Sleeps (1938)
- While New York Sleeps: (1920 & 1938)
- While No One Is Watching (2013)
- While Parents Sleep (1935)
- While Paris Sleeps: (1923 & 1932)
- While the Patient Slept (1935)
- While Satan Sleeps (1922)
- While She Was Out (2009)
- While the Sun Shines (1947)
- While There is Still Time (1943)
- While There's Life (1913)
- While There's War There's Hope (1974)
- While We're Young (2014)
- While You Were Sleeping (1995)
- While the Women Are Sleeping (2016)
- Whimsical Illusions (1909)
- The Whip and the Body (1963)
- Whip It (2009)
- Whiplash: (1948, 1959 & 2014)
- Whipped (2000)
- Whipsaw (1935)
- Whirl of Youth (1928)
- Whirlpool: (1934, 1949 & 1959)
- Whirlpool of Desire (1935)
- Whirlwind: (1941, 1951, 1953, 1964 & 1988)
- The Whirlwind (1933)
- Whirlwind of Paris (1939)
- Whiskey Business (2012 TV)
- Whiskey Mountain (1977)
- Whiskey School (2005)
- Whiskey Tango Foxtrot (2016)
- Whisky (2004)
- Whisky Galore!: (1949 & 2016)
- Whisky Is Risky (2014)
- Whisky Romeo Zulu (2005)
- Whisper (2007)
- Whisper of the Heart (1995)
- Whisper If I Forget (2014)
- Whisper with the Wind (2009)
- The Whisperers (1966)
- Whispering Canyon (1926)
- Whispering City (1947)
- Whispering Corridors (1998)
- Whispering Footsteps (1943)
- Whispering Ghosts (1942)
- Whispering Sage (1927)
- Whispering Sands (2001)
- Whispering Smith (1948)
- Whispering Smith Hits London (1952)
- Whispering Smith Speaks (1935)
- The Whispering Star (2015)
- Whispering Tongues (1934)
- Whispering Whoopee (1930)
- Whispering Winds (1929)
- Whispering Wires (1926)
- Whispers in the Dark (1992)
- Whispers: An Elephant's Tale (2000)
- Whistle: (2003 & 2013)
- The Whistle (1921)
- Whistle Blower (2014)
- The Whistle Blower (1986)
- Whistle Down the Wind (1961)
- The Whistle at Eaton Falls (1951)
- Whistle and I'll Come to You: (1968 TV & 2010 TV)
- Whistle Stop: (1946 & 1963)
- The Whistleblower (2010)
- The Whistler (1944)
- The Whistlers (2019)
- Whistlin' Dan (1932)
- Whistling in Brooklyn (1943)
- Whistling in the Dark: (1933 & 1941)
- Whistling in Dixie (1942)
- Whistling Hills (1951)
- Whistling Smith (1975)
- White (2016)
- White Acacia (1957)
- White Angel (1994)
- White Ant (2016)
- White Apache (1986)
- White Badge (1992)
- White Banners (1938)
- The White Buffalo (1977)
- White Chicks (2004)
- White Christmas (1954)
- The White Cliffs of Dover (1944)
- White Corridors (1951)
- The White Countess (2006)
- The White Crow: (1980 & 2018)
- White Dog (1982)
- The White Dove: (1920, 1942 & 1960)
- White Fang: (1936, 1973, 1991 & 2018)
- White Fang 2: Myth of the White Wolf (1994)
- White Fawn's Devotion (1910)
- White Fire (1984)
- White God (2014)
- The White God (1932)
- White Hair Devil Lady (1980)
- The White Haired Witch of Lunar Kingdom (2014)
- White Heat (1949)
- The White Horse Inn: (1926, 1935, 1952 & 1960)
- White House Down (2013)
- White Hunter Black Heart (1990)
- White Irish Drinkers (2010)
- The White King (2016)
- White Lie (2019)
- White Lightnin' (2009)
- White Lightning: (1953 & 1973)
- White Line Fever (1975)
- White Man's Burden (1995)
- White Material (2009)
- White Men Can't Jump (1992)
- White Mischief (1987)
- White Night: (2009, 2012 & 2017)
- White Night Wedding (2008)
- White Nights: (1916, 1957, 1959 & 1985)
- White Noise: (2005, 2020 & 2022)
- White Noise: The Light (2007)
- White Oleander (2002)
- White Palace (1990)
- The White Parade (1934)
- White Paradise: (1924, 1929 & 2022)
- The White Reindeer (1952)
- The White Ribbon (2009)
- White Sands (1992)
- White Savage (1943)
- White Settlers (2014)
- The White Sheik (1952)
- The White Sister: (1915, 1923, 1933 & 1960)
- White Skin (2004)
- White Snake (2019)
- White Snake 2: The Tribulation of the Green Snake (2021)
- White as Snow (2010)
- White Squall (1996)
- White Sun of the Desert (1969)
- The White Tiger (2021)
- The White Wall (1975)
- The White Waltz (1943)
- White Wilderness (1958)
- White Woman (1933)
- White Zombie (1932)
- A White, White Day (2019)
- White: Melody of Death (2011)
- Whiteboyz (1999)
- Whiteout: (2000 & 2009)
- Whitewash (1994) TV
- Whitewash (2013)

==== Who ====
- Who Am I?: (1998, 2009 & 2014)
- Who Am I 2015 (2015)
- Who Am I This Time? (1982)
- Who Are the DeBolts? And Where Did They Get Nineteen Kids? (1977)
- Who Bombed Judi Bari (2012)
- Who Can Kill a Child? (1978)
- Who Is Cletis Tout? (2001)
- Who Dares Wins (1982)
- Who Do You Love? (2008)
- Who Does She Think She Is (2008)
- Who Done It?: (1942, 1949 & 1956)
- Who Framed Roger Rabbit (1988)
- Who Gets the Dog? (2016)
- Who Goes Next? (1938)
- Who Goes There! (1952)
- Who Has Seen the Wind (1977)
- Who Has Seen the Wind? (1965)
- Who Is Harry Kellerman and Why Is He Saying Those Terrible Things About Me? (1971)
- Who Invented Divorce? (1928)
- Who Killed Captain Alex? (2010)
- Who Killed Doc Robbin (1948)
- Who Killed the Electric Car? (2006)
- Who Killed Lamb? (1974)
- Who Killed Santa Claus? (1941)
- Who Is Killing the Great Chefs of Europe? (1978)
- Who Looks for Gold? (1974)
- Who Moved My Dream (2014)
- Who Never Lived (2006)
- Who Sleeps My Bro (2016)
- Who is Undercover (2014)
- Who We Love (2021)
- Who You Think I Am (2019)
- Who'll Stop the Rain (1978)
- Who's Afraid of Virginia Woolf? (1966)
- Who's Been Sleeping in My Bed? (1963)
- Who's Boss? (1914)
- Who's Cookin' Who? (1946)
- Who's Counting? Marilyn Waring on Sex, Lies and Global Economics (1995)
- Who's Driving Doug (2016)
- Who's Gonna Love Me Now? (2016)
- Who's Got the Action? (1962)
- Who's Harry Crumb? (1989)
- Who's Kissing Madeleine? (1939)
- Who's Minding the Mint? (1967)
- Who's Minding the Store? (1963)
- Who's My Favourite Girl (1999)
- Who's Quentin? (2005)
- Who's Singin' Over There? (1980)
- Who's That Girl (1987)
- Who's That Knocking at My Door (1967)
- Who's That Soldier? (1987)
- Who's Who in Animal Land (1944)
- Who's Who In The Wrestling World - And Why? (1927)
- Who's Who in the Zoo (1942)
- Who's Your Caddy? (2007)
- Who's Your Daddy? (2002)
- The Whole Nine Yards (2000)
- The Whole Ten Yards (2004)
- The Whole Town's Talking: (1926 & 1935)
- The Whole Truth: (1923, 1958 & 2016)
- The Whole Wide World (1996)
- The Whoopee Boys (1986)
- Whoopee! (1930)
- Whore: (1991, 2004 & 2008)
- The Whore: (2009 & 2010 TV)
- Whores' Glory (2011)

==== Why ====
- Why? (1987)
- Why Be Good? (1929)
- Why Beauty Matters (2009)
- Why Bring That Up? (1929)
- Why Can't We Be a Family Again? (2002)
- Why Change Your Wife? (1920)
- Why Cheat India (2019)
- Why the Cuckoo Cries (1967)
- Why Cry at Parting? (1929)
- Why Did I Ever Say Yes Twice? (1969)
- Why Did I Get Married? (2007)
- Why Did I Get Married Too? (2010)
- Why Didn't Anybody Tell Me It Would Become This Bad in Afghanistan (2007)
- Why Do Fools Fall in Love (1998)
- Why Do These Kids Love School? (1999)
- Why Do They Call It Love When They Mean Sex? (1993)
- Why Does Herr R. Run Amok? (1970)
- Why Don't You Play in Hell? (2013)
- Why Get a Divorce? (1926)
- Why Girls Go Back Home (1926)
- Why Girls Leave Home: (1921 & 1945)
- Why Girls Love Sailors (1927)
- Why Girls Say No (1927)
- Why Has Bodhi-Dharma Left for the East? (1989)
- Why He Gave Up (1911)
- Why Him? (2016)
- Why Horror? (2014)
- Why I Wore Lipstick to My Mastectomy (2006)
- Why I Would Not Marry? (1918)
- Why Is the Crow Black-Coated (1956)
- Why Korea? (1950)
- Why Leave Home? (1929)
- Why Man Creates (1968)
- Why Me?: (1978, 1984, 1985, 1990 & 2015)
- Why Me, Sweetie?! (2003)
- Why Men Don't Listen and Women Can't Read Maps (2007)
- Why Men Leave Home (1924)
- Why Men Work (1924)
- Why Must I Die? (1960)
- Why Not Me? (1999)
- Why Pick on Me?: (1918 & 1937)
- Why Rock the Boat? (1974)
- Why Sailors Go Wrong (1928)
- Why Sailors Leave Home (1930)
- Why She Would Not (1950)
- Why the Sheriff Is a Bachelor (1914)
- Why Shoot the Teacher? (1977)
- Why Smith Left Home (1919)
- Why Stop Now (2012)
- Why the Swallow Has the Tail with Little Horns (1967)
- Why That Actor Was Late (1908)
- Why Wal-Mart Works; and Why That Drives Some People C-R-A-Z-Y (2005)
- Why We Bang (2006)
- Why We Fight (2005)
- Why We Laugh: Black Comedians on Black Comedy (2009)
- Why Women Love (1925)
- Why Worry? (1923)
- Why Would I Lie? (1980)
- Whys and Other Whys (1927)

=== Wi ===
==== Wib–Wic ====
- Wibbel the Tailor: (1920, 1931 & 1939)
- Wichita (1955)
- Wicked: (1931, 1998 & 2024)
- The Wicked: (1991 & 2013)
- Wicked Blood (2014)
- The Wicked Carabel (1935)
- Wicked City: (1949 & 1987)
- The Wicked City (1992)
- The Wicked Darling (1919)
- The Wicked Dreams of Paula Schultz (1968)
- Wicked: For Good (2025)
- A Wicked Ghost (1999)
- A Wicked Ghost II: The Fear (2000)
- A Wicked Ghost III: The Possession (2002)
- The Wicked Lady: (1945 & 1983)
- Wicked Little Things (2006)
- Wicked Spring (2002)
- Wicked Stepmother (1989)
- A Wicked Tale (2005)
- Wicked as They Come (1956)
- Wicked, Wicked (1973)
- Wicked Woman (1953)
- A Wicked Woman (1934)
- Wickedness Preferred (1928)
- Wicker (2026)
- The Wicker Man: (1973 & 2006)
- Wicker Park (2004)
- The Wicker Tree (2011)
- The Wickham Mystery (1931)

==== Wid ====
- Wide Awake: (1998 & 2007)
- The Wide Blue Road (1957)
- Wide Blue Yonder (2010)
- Wide-Eyed and Legless (1993)
- Wide Open (1930)
- Wide Open Faces (1938)
- Wide Open Spaces: (1924 & 1947)
- Wide Open Town (1941)
- Wide Sargasso Sea: (1993 & 2006)
- Widecombe Fair (1928)
- Wideo Wabbit (1956)
- The Widow: (1939 & 1955)
- The Widow Casey's Return (1912)
- The Widow from Chicago (1930)
- The Widow Couderc (1971)
- The Widow from Monte Carlo (1935)
- The Widow of Montiel (1979)
- The Widow of Saint-Pierre (2000)
- The Widow in Scarlet (1932)
- Widow of Silence (2018)
- The Widow's Ball (1930)
- The Widow's Investment (1914)
- Widow's Might (1935)
- The Widow's Might: (1918 & 2009)
- The Widowhood of Karolina Žašler (1976)
- The Widowmaker (1990 TV)
- Widows: (1976, 2011 & 2018)
- The Widows of Thursdays (2009)
- Widows' Peak (1994)
- The Width of the Pavement (1956)

==== Wie–Wig ====
- Wie die Karnickel (2002)
- Wie die Wilden (1959 TV)
- Wiebo's War (2011)
- Wielka droga (1946)
- Wiener-Dog (2016)
- Wiener Takes All: A Dogumentary (2007)
- Wieners (2008)
- Wierna rzeka: (1936 & 1983)
- Wife (1953)
- The Wife: (1995 & 2017)
- Wife Against Wife (1921)
- Wife and Auto Trouble (1916)
- The Wife of the Centaur (1924)
- A Wife Confesses (1961)
- Wife or Country (1918)
- A Wife in Danger (1939)
- Wife, Doctor and Nurse (1937)
- The Wife of Forty Years (1925)
- The Wife of General Ling (1937)
- The Wife He Bought (1918)
- Wife, Husband and Friend (1939)
- The Wife of an Important Man (1988)
- The Wife of Monte Cristo (1946)
- Wife, Mother, Murderer (1991)
- Wife in Name Only (1923)
- Wife for a Night (1952)
- Wife Number 13 (1962)
- Wife Number Two (1917)
- A Wife from Paris (1966)
- Wife Savers (1928)
- Wife of a Spy (2020 TV)
- The Wife Swappers (1970)
- The Wife Takes a Flyer (1942)
- Wife Tamers (1926)
- A Wife or Two (1936)
- Wife vs. Secretary (1936)
- Wife Wanted: (1915 & 1946)
- The Wife Who Wasn't Wanted (1925)
- The Wife's Family (1931)
- A Wife's Heart (1956)
- A Wife's Life (1950)
- The Wife's Relations (1928)
- A Wife's Sacrifice (1916)
- The Wig: (1925 & 2005)
- Wiggle Your Ears (1929)
- The Wiggles Movie (1997)
- Wigilia (2014)
- Wigstock: The Movie (1995)

==== Wil–Wim ====
- Wilaya (2011)
- Wilbur Wants to Kill Himself (2002)
- The Wilby Conspiracy (1975)
- Wilby Wonderful (2004)
- The Wild (2006)
- The Wild Affair (1965)
- Wild America (1997)
- The Wild Angels (1966)
- A Wild Ass of a Man (1980 TV)
- The Wild Bees (2001)
- Wild Bill: (1995 & 2011)
- The Wild Blue Yonder: (1951 & 2005)
- Wild Boy (1952)
- The Wild Bunch (1969)
- The Wild Bunch: An Album in Montage (1996)
- Wild Cactus (1993)
- Wild Card: (2003 & 2015)
- The Wild Chase (1965)
- The Wild Child (1970)
- Wild Combination: A Portrait of Arthur Russell (2008)
- The Wild Country (1970)
- Wild in the Country (1961)
- Wild Dogs (1985)
- The Wild Dogs (2002)
- The Wild Duck (1984)
- The Wild East (1993)
- The Wild Eye (1967)
- The Wild Flower and the Rose (1910)
- The Wild Frontier (1947)
- The Wild Geese: (1953 & 1978)
- Wild Geese II (1985)
- The Wild Girl (1917)
- The Wild Girl (1925)
- The Wild Goose (1921)
- The Wild Goose Chase: (1915 & 1932)
- The Wild Goose Lake (2019)
- The Wild Goose on the Wing (1979)
- Wild Grass (2009)
- Wild Guitar (1962)
- A Wild Hare (1940)
- Wild at Heart (1990)
- Wild Hogs (2007)
- Wild Horse (1931)
- Wild Horse Nine (2026)
- The Wild Horse Stampede (1926)
- Wild Horses: (1985 TV, 1995 & 2015)
- The Wild Hunt (2009)
- Wild Indian (2021)
- Wild Is the Wind (1957)
- The Wild Life (1984)
- Wild Life: (2011 & 2014)
- The Wild Man of Borneo (1941)
- The Wild Man of the Navidad (2008)
- The Wild McCullochs (1975)
- Wild Mountain Thyme (2020)
- The Wild One (1953)
- The Wild Ones (2012)
- Wild Orchid (1989)
- Wild Orchid II: Two Shades of Blue (1991)
- Wild Orchids (1929)
- The Wild Parrots of Telegraph Hill (2005)
- The Wild Party: (1923, 1929, 1956 & 1975)
- The Wild Pear Tree (2018)
- Wild Rebels (1967)
- Wild Reeds (1995)
- The Wild Ride (1960)
- Wild River (1960)
- The Wild Robot (2024)
- The Wild Sea (1969)
- Wild Side (1995 & 2004)
- Wild Strawberries (1957)
- Wild in the Streets (1968)
- Wild Tales (2014)
- Wild Target (2010)
- Wild Things series:
  - Wild Things (1998)
  - Wild Things 2 (2004)
  - Wild Things: Diamonds in the Rough (2005)
  - Wild Things: Foursome (2010)
- The Wild Thornberrys Movie (2002)
- Wild Tigers I Have Known (2006)
- The Wild, Wild Rose (1960)
- Wild Wild West (1999)
- Wild Women of Wongo (1958)
- Wild and Woolly: (1917, 1932 & 1937)
- Wild and Wonderful (1964)
- The Wild and Wonderful Whites of West Virginia (2009)
- The Wild, Wild World of Jayne Mansfield (1968)
- The Wild and Wycked World of Brian Jones (2005)
- Wild Zero (2000)
- The Wildcat: (1917, 1921 & 1936)
- Wildcats (1986)
- Wilde (1997)
- Wilde Salomé (2011)
- Wilder Napalm (1993)
- Wilderness: (2006 & 2017)
- The Wilderness (2025)
- Wildlife (2018)
- Wildling (2018)
- Wildwood (2026)
- Will: (1981 & 2011)
- The Will: (1921, 1939 & 2020)
- Will Any Gentleman...? (1953)
- A Will of Her Own (1915)
- Will Penny (1968)
- Will Success Spoil Rock Hunter? (1957)
- A Will and a Way (1922)
- Will: G. Gordon Liddy (1982 TV)
- Willard: (1971 & 2003)
- William Shakespeare's Romeo + Juliet (1996)
- Willie Dynamite (1974)
- The Willoughbys (2020)
- Willow: (1988 & 2019)
- Willow Creek (2013)
- Willow and Wind (2000)
- Willy Wonka & the Chocolate Factory (1971)
- Willy's Wonderland (2021)
- Wilson: (1944 & 2017)
- Wimbledon (2004)

==== Win ====
- Win! (2016)
- Win a Date with Tad Hamilton! (2004)
- Win It All (2017)
- Win That Girl (1928)
- Win Win (2011)
- Win, Lose and Kaboom (2004)
- Winchell (1998)
- Winchester '73 (1950)
- Winchester: The House That Ghosts Built (2018)
- Wind (1992)
- The Wind: (1928, 1982 & 1986)
- Wind Across the Everglades (1958)
- Wind Chill (2007)
- Wind Echoing in My Being (1997)
- Wind in the Face (1930)
- The Wind and the Lion (1975)
- Wind Over Water (2003)
- The Wind Rises (2013)
- Wind River (2017)
- The Wind That Shakes the Barley (2006)
- The Wind Will Carry Us (1999)
- Wind in the Willows (1988)
- The Wind in the Willows: (1983, 1987, 1995, 1996 & 2006 TV)
- Wind in the Wire (1993)
- Windaria (1986)
- Windbag the Sailor (1936)
- Windcatcher (2024)
- Windfall: (1935, 1955 & 2010)
- Windhorse (1998)
- The Winding Road (1920)
- The Winding Stair (1925)
- Windjammer: (1930, 1937 & 1958)
- The Windmill (1937)
- The Windmill Massacre (2016)
- Windom's Way (1957)
- The Window: (1949 & 1970)
- The Window Cleaner (1968)
- Window Cleaners (1940)
- Window Connection (2014)
- Window Horses (2016)
- A Window in London (1940)
- A Window in Piccadilly (1928)
- Window Water Baby Moving (1959)
- A Window on Washington Park (1913)
- Windows (1980)
- The Winds of the Aures (1967)
- The Winds of Kitty Hawk (1978 TV)
- Winds of the Pampas (1927)
- Winds of September (2008)
- Winds of the Wasteland (1936)
- Windsor Drive (2015)
- Windstorm (2013)
- Windstruck (2004)
- Windtalkers (2002)
- Windwalker (1981)
- Windy City (1984)
- Windy City Heat (2003)
- Wine: (1913 & 1924)
- Wine Cellars (1930)
- Wine Country (2019)
- Wine of Morning (1955)
- Wine Road of the Samurai (2006)
- Wine, Women and Horses (1937)
- Wine, Women and Song (1933)
- Wine of Youth (1924)
- Wing Chun (1994)
- Wing Commander (1999)
- A Wing and a Prayer (2015)
- Winged Migration (2001)
- The Wings (1916)
- Wings: (1927, 1966 & 2012)
- Wings of Courage (1995)
- Wings of Desire (1987)
- The Wings of the Dove: (1981 & 1997)
- The Wings of Eagles (1957)
- Wings of Honneamise (1995)
- Winky's Horse (2005)
- The Winner: (1926, 1962, 1996, 2011, 2014 & 2016)
- A Winner Never Quits (1986 TV)
- Winners and Sinners (1983)
- Winnie the Pooh series:
  - Winnie the Pooh and the Honey Tree (1966)
  - Winnie the Pooh and the Blustery Day (1968)
  - Winnie the Pooh and Tigger Too! (1974)
  - The Many Adventures of Winnie the Pooh (1977)
  - Winnie the Pooh and a Day for Eeyore (1983)
  - Pooh's Grand Adventure: The Search for Christopher Robin (1997)
  - Winnie the Pooh: Seasons of Giving (1999)
  - The Tigger Movie (2000)
  - The Book of Pooh: Stories from the Heart (2001)
  - A Very Merry Pooh Year (2002)
  - Piglet's Big Movie (2003)
  - Winnie the Pooh: Springtime with Roo (2004)
  - Pooh's Heffalump Movie (2005)
  - Pooh's Heffalump Halloween Movie (2005)
  - Super Sleuth Christmas Movie (2007)
  - Tigger & Pooh and a Musical Too (2009)
  - Winnie the Pooh (2011)
- Winnie-the-Pooh: Blood and Honey (2023)
- Winnie-the-Pooh: Blood and Honey 2 (2024)
- Winning (1969)
- Winning London (2001)
- The Winslow Boy: (1948 & 1999)
- Winstanley (1975)
- Winter: (1930, 2002 & 2009)
- The Winter (2016)
- Winter 1960 (1983)
- Winter A-Go-Go (1965)
- Winter Brothers (2017)
- Winter Buoy (2015)
- Winter Carnival (1939)
- Winter Cherry (1985)
- A Winter of Cyclists (2013)
- Winter Days (2003)
- Winter of Discontent (2012)
- Winter Evening in Gagra (1985)
- Winter on Fire: Ukraine's Fight for Freedom (2015)
- Winter Flies (2018)
- Winter of Frozen Dreams (2009)
- The Winter Guest (1997)
- Winter Holidays (1959)
- Winter in the Blood (2013)
- Winter in Rio (2002)
- Winter in Tokyo (2016)
- Winter in Wartime (2008)
- Winter in the Woods: (1936 & 1956)
- Winter Journey: (2006 & 2013)
- Winter Kept Us Warm (1965)
- Winter Kill (1974 TV)
- Winter Kills (1979)
- Winter Light (1963)
- Winter Meeting (1948)
- Winter Night's Dream (1935)
- Winter of Our Dreams (1981)
- Winter Passing (2006)
- Winter People (1989)
- Winter Ridge (2018)
- A Winter Rose (2016)
- Winter Sleep (2014)
- Winter Sleepers (1997)
- Winter Soldier (1972)
- Winter Solstice (2004)
- Winter Spring Summer or Fall (2024)
- Winter Storage (1949)
- Winter Stories (1999)
- Winter Storms (1924)
- A Winter Tale (2007)
- A Winter Tan (1987)
- Winter Vacation (2010)
- Winter Visitor (2008)
- The Winter War (1989)
- Winter Woman (1977)
- Winter Wonderland (1946)
- Winter's Bone (2010)
- Winter's Night (2018)
- Winter's Tale (2014)
- Winterborn (1978)
- Winterhawk (1975)
- Winterset (1936)
- Winterspelt (1979)
- Wintertime (1943)

==== Wir–Wis ====
- Wir Wunderkinder (1958)
- Wira (2019)
- Wired (1989)
- The Wireless Wire-Walkers (1921)
- Wiren (2018)
- Wire Room (2022)
- Wiretapper (1955)
- Wisconsin Death Trip (1999)
- Wisdom (1986)
- The Wisdom of Crocodiles (2000)
- Wisdom of the Pretzel (2002)
- The Wisdom Tree (2013)
- Wise Blood (1979)
- A Wise Fool (1921)
- Wise Girl (1937)
- Wise Girls (1929)
- The Wise Guy (1926)
- Wise Guys: (1961 & 1986)
- The Wise Guys (1965)
- The Wise Kid (1922)
- The Wise Kids (2011)
- The Wise Little Hen (1934)
- Wise Quackers (1949)
- The Wise Quacking Duck (1943)
- Wise Quacks (1939)
- The Wise Wife (1927)
- WiseGirls (2002)
- The Wiser Sex (1932)
- Wish (2023)
- Wish For Tomorrow (2015)
- Wish I Was Here (2014)
- Wish I Were a Shark (1999)
- Wish Me Away (2011)
- Wish Me Luck (2001)
- Wish Upon (2017)
- Wish upon a Pike (1938)
- Wish Upon a Star (1996 TV)
- Wish You Happy Breakup (2016)
- Wish You Well (2013)
- Wish You Were Here: (1987, 2012, 2013 & 2025)
- The Wishbone (1933)
- Wishbone's Dog Days of the West (1998)
- Wishcraft (2002)
- Wished (2017)
- Wished on Mabel (1915)
- Wishful Thinking (1997)
- Wishin' and Hopin' (2014)
- The Wishing Ring: An Idyll of Old England (1914)
- The Wishing Ring Man (1919)
- Wishing Stairs (2003)
- The Wishing-Table (1956)
- The Wishing Tree (1977)
- Wishmaster series:
  - Wishmaster (1997)
  - Wishmaster 2: Evil Never Dies (1999)
  - Wishmaster 3: Beyond the Gates of Hell (2001)
  - Wishmaster: The Prophecy Fulfilled (2002)
- The Wiskottens (1926)
- The Wistful Widow of Wagon Gap (1947)

==== Wit ====
- Wit (2001 TV)
- Wit Nyin Ka Kyoe (2017)
- The Witch: (1906, 1916, 1954 & 2015)
- Witch Academy (1995)
- Witch Crafty (1955)
- Witch Doctor (2016)
- Witch Hunt: (1994, 1999 TV & 2019)
- The Witch Hunt (1981)
- Witch from Nepal (1986)
- Witch Story (1989)
- Witch Way Love (1997)
- The Witch Who Came from the Sea (1976)
- A Witch Without a Broom (1967)
- The Witch's Cradle (1944)
- The Witch's Mirror (1962)
- A Witch's Tangled Hare (1959)
- Witchblade (2000 TV)
- Witchboard: (1986 & 2024)
- Witchboard 2: The Devil's Doorway (1993)
- Witchboard III: The Possession (1995)
- Witchcraft: (1916 & 1964)
- Witchcraft series:
  - Witchcraft (1988)
  - Witchcraft II: The Temptress (1990)
  - Witchcraft III: The Kiss of Death (1991)
  - Witchcraft IV: The Virgin Heart (1992)
  - Witchcraft V: Dance with the Devil (1993)
  - Witchcraft VI: The Devil's Mistress (1994)
  - Witchcraft VII: Judgement Hour (1995)
  - Witchcraft VIII: Salem's Ghost (1996)
  - Witchcraft IX: Bitter Flesh (1997)
  - Witchcraft X: Mistress of the Craft (1998)
  - Witchcraft XI: Sisters in Blood (2000)
  - Witchcraft XII: In the Lair of the Serpent (2002)
  - Witchcraft XIII: Blood of the Chosen (2008)
  - Witchcraft XIV: Angel of Death (2016)
  - Witchcraft XV: Blood Rose (2016)
  - Witchcraft XVI: Hollywood Coven (2016)
- The Witcher (2001)
- The Witcher: Nightmare of the Wolf (2021)
- Witchery (1988)
- The Witches: (1966, 1967, 1990 & 2020)
- Witches of the Caribbean (2005)
- The Witches Cave (1989)
- The Witches of Eastwick (1987)
- The Witches Mountain (1972)
- Witches to the North (2001)
- Witches' Brew (1980)
- Witches' Night: (1927 & 1937)
- Witchfinder General (1968)
- Witchhammer (1970)
- Witching & Bitching (2013)
- The Witching Hour: (1921, 1934 & 1985)
- Witchouse (1999)
- Witchville (2010 TV)
- Witchy Pretty Cure! The Movie: Wonderous! Cure Mofurun! (2016)
- With All Her Heart (1920)
- With Babies and Banners: Story of the Women's Emergency Brigade (1979)
- With Beauty and Sorrow (1965)
- With Broken Wings (1938)
- With Buffalo Bill on the U. P. Trail (1926)
- With Byrd at the South Pole (1930)
- With Children at the Seaside (1972)
- With a Friend Like Harry... (2000)
- With Honors (1994)
- With Six You Get Eggroll (1968)
  - Within (2016)
- Within Our Gates (1920)
- Within the Law: (1916, 1917, 1923 & 1939)
- Within the Rock (1996 TV)
- Within the Woods (1979)
- Withnail and I (1987)
- Without (2011)
- Without Anesthesia (1978)
- Without a Clue (1988)
- Without Honor: (1932 & 1949)
- Without Limits (1998)
- Without Love (1945)
- Without a Paddle (2004)
- Without Remorse (2021)
- Without Warning: (1980 & 1994)
- Without Warning: The James Brady Story (1991 TV)
- Witless Protection (2008)
- Witness: (1985 & 1988)
- The Witness: (1969 French, 1969 Hungarian, 1992, 2000, 2012, 2015 American, 2015 Chinese & 2018)
- Witness in the Dark (1959)
- Witness to the Execution (1994)
- Witness to Murder (1954)
- Witness for the Prosecution: (1957 & 1982 TV)
- Witnesses (2003)
- The Witty Sorcerer (1931)

==== Wiv–Wiz ====
- Wives at Auction (1926)
- The Wives He Forgot (2006)
- The Wives of Jamestown (1913)
- Wives and Lovers (1963)
- Wives of Men (1918)
- Wives Never Know (1936)
- Wives and Obscurities (1956)
- Wives and Other Wives (1918)
- Wives on Strike (2016)
- Wives – Ten Years After (1985)
- Wives Under Suspicion (1938)
- A Wives' Tale (1980)
- The Wiz (1978)
- The Wizard: (1927 & 1989)
- The Wizard of Baghdad (1960)
- The Wizard of Gore: (1970 & 2007)
- The Wizard of Lies (2017 TV)
- The Wizard of Loneliness (1988)
- The Wizard of Oz: (1925, 1933, 1939, 1950 TV & 1982)
- Wizard of Space and Time (1989)
- The Wizard of Speed and Time (1989)
- The Wizard of Stone Mountain (2011)
- The Wizard of the Strings (1985)
- Wizards (1977)
- Wizards of the Demon Sword (1991)
- Wizards of the Lost Kingdom (1985)
- Wizards of the Lost Kingdom II (1989)
- Wizards of Waverly Place: The Movie (2009 TV)
- A Wizard's Tale (2018)
- Wizard's Way (2013)
- Wizja lokalna 1901 (1981)

=== Wk ===
- wkw/tk/1996@7'55"hk.net (1996)

=== Wo ===
- Wo Ai Ni Mommy (2010)
- Wo Du hin gehst (1957)
- Wo Hu (2006)
- Wo der Zug nicht lange hält... (1960)

==== Wob–Wok ====
- Wobble Palace (2018)
- Woe to the Young (1961)
- The Woes of Roller Skaters (1908)
- The Wog Boy (2000)
- Wog Boy 2: Kings of Mykonos (2010)
- Woh Chokri (1994)
- Woh Din Yaad Karo (1971)
- Woh Jo Hasina (1983)
- Woh Kaun Thi? (1964)
- Woh Lamhe (2006)
- Woh Main Nahin (1974)
- Woh Phir Aayegi (1988)
- Woh Saat Din (1983)
- Woh Tera Naam Tha (2004)
- Wohi Raat Wohi Awaaz (1973)
- Wohin? (1988)
- Wojaczek (1999)
- Wojewoda (1912)
- Woke Up Like This (2017)

==== Wol ====
- The Wold Shadow (1972)
- Wolf: (1955, 1994, 2013, 2021 Indian & 2021 Irish-Polish)
- The Wolf: (1916, 1949 & 2004)
- Wolf Blood (1925)
- Wolf Children (2012)
- Wolf Creek (2005)
- Wolf Creek 2 (2013)
- The Wolf of Debt (1915)
- Wolf Devil Woman (1982)
- Wolf Dog (1958)
- The Wolf Dog (1933)
- A Wolf at the Door (2013)
- The Wolf at the Door (1986)
- Wolf Fangs (1927)
- Wolf Girl (2001 TV)
- The Wolf Hunters (1949)
- Wolf Larsen (1958)
- The Wolf and the Lion (2021)
- Wolf Lowry (1917)
- Wolf Man (2025)
- The Wolf Man: (1924 short & 1941)
- The Wolf Men (1969)
- Wolf of New York (1940)
- Wolf Riders (1935)
- Wolf and Sheep (2016)
- The Wolf of the Sila (1949)
- The Wolf of Snow Hollow (2020)
- Wolf Song (1929)
- "Wolf Song: The Movie" (2016)
- Wolf Totem (2015)
- Wolf Tracks (1920)
- Wolf Warriors (2015)
- Wolf Warriors 2 (2017)
- The Wolf of Wall Street: (1929 & 2013)
- The Wolf Woman (1916)
- WolfCop (2014)
- Wolfen (1981)
- Wolfhound: (1991, 2002 & 2006)
- The Wolfman (2010)
- The Wolfpack (2015)
- Wolfram (2025)
- Wolfwalkers (2020)
- The Wolf's Call (2019)
- Wolf's Clothing: (1927 & 1936)
- Wolf's Hole (1987)
- Wolfs (2024)
- Wolfsburg (2003)
- "Wolfsong (Short) (2013)
- The Wolverine (2013)
- Wolves: (1930, 1999, 2014 & 2016)
- The Wolves: (1956 & 1971)
- Wolves of the City (1929)
- Wolves Cry Under the Moon (1997)
- Wolves of the Deep (1959)
- Wolves of the Desert (1926)
- Wolves at the Door (2016)
- Wolves Hunt at Night (1952)
- Wolves of the Night (1919)
- Wolves at Our Door (1997)
- Wolves, Pigs and Men (1964)
- Wolves of the Rail (1918)
- Wolves of the Range (1943)
- Wolves and Sheep (1953)
- Wolves of the Street (1920)
- Wolves of Wall Street (2002)
- The Wolves of Willoughby Chase (1989)
- Wolvesbayne (2009)

==== Wom ====
- Woman: (1918 & 1968)
- A Woman (1915)
- The Woman: (1915 & 2011)
- The Woman in 47 (1916)
- The Woman Accused (1933)
- The Woman in the Advocate's Gown (1929)
- Woman Against Woman (1938)
- Woman Against the World (1937)
- Woman Basketball Player No. 5 (1957)
- A Woman and the Beancurd Soup (1968)
- The Woman Beneath (1917)
- The Woman from Berlin (1925)
- The Woman Between: (1931 American & 1931 British)
- The Woman Between Friends (1918)
- Woman Between Wolf and Dog (1979)
- The Woman in Black: (1914, 1989 & 2012)
- The Woman in Black: Angel of Death (2014)
- The Woman in Blue (1973)
- Woman Buried Alive (1973)
- The Woman in the Case: (1916 American & 1916 Australian)
- The Woman Chaser (1999)
- Woman Chases Man (1937)
- The Woman from China (1931)
- The Woman with Closed Eyes (1926)
- The Woman Condemned (1934)
- The Woman Conquers (1922)
- The Woman Cop (1980)
- The Woman at the Crossroads: (1919 & 1938)
- The Woman by the Dark Window (1960)
- The Woman Disputed (1928)
- The Woman in Doctor's Garb (1920)
- The Woman Dressed As a Man (1932)
- Woman in a Dressing Gown (1957)
- Woman in the Dunes (1964)
- The Woman Eater (1957)
- The Woman Everyone Loves Is You (1929)
- The Woman in the Fifth (2011)
- Woman of Fire (1971)
- Woman of Fire '82 (1982)
- The Woman in Flames (1924)
- The Woman from the Folies Bergères (1927)
- The Woman Gives (1920)
- The Woman God Changed (1921)
- The Woman God Forgot (1917)
- Woman in Gold (2015)
- The Woman in Gold (1926)
- The Woman in Green (1945)
- Woman in a Hat (1985)
- The Woman Hater: (1910 Powers film, 1910 Thanhouser film & 1925)
- Woman Hater (1948)
- The Woman Haters (1913)
- Woman Haters (1934)
- The Woman He Loved (1988)
- The Woman He Married (1922)
- The Woman in Heaven (1920)
- The Woman from Hell (1929)
- The Woman in His House (1920)
- Woman of the Hour (2024)
- The Woman Hunt (1972)
- The Woman Hunter (1972)
- The Woman for Joe (1955)
- The Woman Juror (1926)
- The Woman I Love: (1929 & 1937)
- The Woman I Stole (1933)
- The Woman Inside (1981)
- Woman Is the Future of Man (2004)
- The Woman Knight of Mirror Lake (2011)
- The Woman from Last Night (1950)
- A Woman Like You: (1933 & 1939)
- The Woman from Mellon's (1910)
- The Woman Michael Married (1919)
- The Woman at Midnight (1925)
- The Woman from Monte Carlo (1932)
- Woman in the Moon (1929)
- The Woman from Moscow (1928)
- The Woman Next Door: (1915, 1919 & 1981)
- The Woman One Longs For (1929)
- The Woman from the Orient (1923)
- A Woman of Paris (1923)
- The Woman and the Puppet: (1920 & 1929)
- The Woman in Question (1950)
- The Woman Racket (1930)
- A Woman Rebels (1936)
- The Woman in Red: (1935, 1947 & 1984)
- The Woman in Room 13: (1920 & 1932)
- A Woman of the Sea (1926)
- The Woman and the Stranger (1985)
- Woman of Straw (1964)
- The Woman Suffers (1918)
- The Woman from Tangier (1948)
- The Woman Tempted (1926)
- The Woman That Dreamed About a Man (2010)
- Woman They Almost Lynched (1953)
- The Woman They Talk About (1931)
- The Woman Thief (1938)
- Woman Thou Art Loosed (2004)
- The Woman Thou Gavest Me (1919)
- The Woman from Till 12 (1928)
- Women of Today (1936)
- Woman on Top (2000)
- The Woman Under Cover (1919)
- A Woman Under the Influence (1974)
- The Woman Under Oath (1919)
- The Woman Upstairs (1921)
- Woman Walks Ahead (2017)
- The Woman from Warren's (1915)
- The Woman in White: (1912, 1917, 1921, 1929 & 1948)
- The Woman Who Believed (1922)
- The Woman Who Brushed Off Her Tears (2012)
- The Woman Who Came Back (1945)
- The Woman Who Couldn't Say No (1927)
- The Woman Who Dared: (1933 & 1944)
- The Woman Who Desires Sin (1929)
- The Woman Who Did: (1915 & 1925)
- The Woman Who Drinks (2001)
- Woman Who Exposes Herself (1981)
- The Woman Who Gave (1918)
- The Woman Who Invented Love (1952)
- The Woman Who Left (2016)
- The Woman Who Loved Elvis (1993)
- The Woman Who Obeyed (1923)
- The Woman Who Ran (2020)
- The Woman Who Sinned (1991)
- The Woman Who Walked Alone (1922)
- The Woman Who Was Nothing (1917)
- The Woman in the Window: (1944 & 2021)
- The Woman Wins (1918)
- The Woman With Four Faces (1923)
- A Woman Without Love (1952)
- The Woman Without Nerves (1930)
- The Woman Without a Soul (1920)
- A Woman Is a Woman (1961)
- The Woman Worth Millions (1923)
- The Woman in the Yard (2025)
- Woman of the Year (1942)
- The Woman's Angle (1952)
- The Woman's Crusade (1926)
- A Woman's Decision (1975)
- Woman's Honor (1913)
- Woman's Law (1927)
- The Woman's Law (1916)
- Woman's Love—Woman's Suffering (1937)
- Woman's Place (1921)
- Woman's Temptation (1959)
- A Woman's Vengeance (1948)
- Woman's World: (1954 & 1967)
- Womb (2010)
- Womb Ghosts (2010)
- Wombling Free (1977)
- Women: (1977, 1985 & 1997)
- The Women: (1939 & 2008)
- Women Are Better Diplomats (1941)
- Women Are Like That (1938)
- Women Are No Angels (1943)
- Women Are Trouble (1936)
- Women Are Warriors (1942)
- Women Are Weak (1959)
- Women Aren't Angels (1943)
- Women in Cages (1971)
- Women in Cell Block 7 (1973)
- Women in Cellblock 9 (1977)
- Women in Defense (1941)
- Women and Diamonds (1924)
- Women Don't Want To (1993)
- Women Drive Me Crazy (2013)
- Women Everywhere (1930)
- Women of Faith (2009)
- Women Go on Forever (1931)
- Women of the Gulag (2018)
- Women He's Undressed (2015)
- Women in Love (1969)
- Women Love Once (1931)
- Women & Men: Stories of Seduction (1990)
- Women & Men 2 (1991)
- Women Men Marry (1922)
- Women Must Dress (1935)
- Women in the Night (1948)
- Women Prison (1988)
- Women for Sale (2005)
- Women Side by Side (1949)
- Women Talking (2022)
- Women Talking Dirty (1999)
- Women They Talk About (1928)
- Women in Trouble (2009)
- Women of Valor (1986 TV)
- Women on the Verge of a Nervous Breakdown (1988)
- Women at War (1943)
- Women in War (1940)
- Women of the Weeping River (2016)
- Women Who Commit Adultery (1922)
- Women Who Fall by the Wayside (1925)
- Women Who Flirt (2014)
- Women Who Kill (2016)
- Women Who Play (1932)
- Women Without Tomorrow (1951)
- Women Won't Tell (1932)
- Women of the World (1963)
- Women You Rarely Greet (1925)
- Women's Club: (1936 & 1956)
- Women's Enemy (2013)
- Women's Games (1946)
- Women's Prison: (1951 & 1955)
- Women's Prison Massacre (1983)
- Women's Property (1999)
- Women's Refuge (1946)
- Women's Sacrifice (1922)
- Women's Town (1953)
- Women's Wares (1927)
- Women's Weapons (1918)

==== Won ====
- Won in a Closet (1914)
- Won in the Clouds (1928)
- Won by a Fish (1912)
- Won by a Head (1920)
- Won by Losing (1916)
- Won by a Neck (1930)
- Won on the Post (1912)
- Won Ton Ton, the Dog Who Saved Hollywood (1976)
- Won by Wireless (1911)
- Won't Back Down (2012)
- Won't Last a Day Without You (2011)
- Won't You Be My Neighbor? (2018)
- Wonder (2017)
- Wonder Bar (1934)
- Wonder Boy (2017)
- Wonder Boys (2000)
- Wonder of It All (1974)
- Wonder Man (1945)
- The Wonder Man (1920)
- Wonder Park (2019)
- Wonder Wheel (2017)
- Wonder Woman films:
  - Wonder Woman: (1974 TV, 2009 animated, & 2017)
  - Wonder Woman: Bloodlines (2019)
  - Wonder Woman 1984 (2020)
- Wonder Women! The Untold Story of American Superheroines (2012)
- Wonder of Women (1929)
- The Wonderers (2025)
- Wonderful Days (2003)
- The Wonderful, Horrible Life of Leni Riefenstahl (1993)
- The Wonderful Ice Cream Suit (1998)
- The Wonderful Land of Oz (1969)
- Wonderful Life: (1964 & 2018)
- Wonderful Losers: A Different World (2017)
- Wonderful Mentality (1953)
- Wonderful Nightmare (2015)
- Wonderful Radio (2012)
- The Wonderful Story: (1922 & 1932)
- The Wonderful Story of Henry Sugar (2023)
- Wonderful Things! (1958)
- Wonderful Town (2007)
- The Wonderful Wizard of Oz (1910)
- Wonderful World: (2009 & 2010)
- The Wonderful World of the Brothers Grimm (1962)
- Wonderful World End (2014)
- Wonderful! Liang Xi Mei (2018)
- Wonderland: (1931, 1997, 1999, 2003 & 2013)
- The Wonderland (2019)
- The Wonders (2014)
- The Wonders of Aladdin (1961)
- Wonders of China (1982)
- Wonders of the Sea 3D (2019)
- Wonderstruck (2017)
- Wonderwall (1968)
- Wondrous Boccaccio (2015)
- Wondrous Oblivion (2003)
- Wonka (2023)

==== Woo ====
- Woo (1998)
- The Wood (1999)
- Wood Job! (2014)
- Wood Love (1925)
- The Wood Nymph (1916)
- Wood Pigeon (1970)
- Wood & Stock: Sexo, Orégano e Rock'n'Roll (2006)
- Wood for War (1942)
- Woodchipper Massacre (1988)
- Woodcutters of the Deep South (1973)
- The Wooden Box (2006)
- The Wooden Bridge (2012)
- The Wooden Camera (2003)
- Wooden Crosses (1932)
- The Wooden Horse (1950)
- The Wooden Leg (1909)
- The Wooden Man's Bride (1994)
- Wooden Shoes (1917)
- Wooden Staircase (1993)
- Woodenhead (2003)
- Woodland Café (1937)
- Woodlawn (2015)
- Woodpecker (2008)
- Woodpecker from Mars (1956)
- Woodpecker in the Moon (1959)
- Woodpecker in the Rough (1952)
- Woodpeckers (2017)
- Woodpeckers Don't Get Headaches (1974)
- Woodrow Wilson and the Birth of the American Century (2002)
- The Woods: (2006 & 2011)
- The Woods Are Full of Cuckoos (1937)
- Woodshock (2017)
- Woodshop (2010)
- The Woodsman: (2004 & 2016)
- The Woodsman and the Rain (2011)
- Woodstock (1970)
- Woody Dines Out (1945)
- Woody the Giant Killer (1947)
- Woody Meets Davy Crewcut (1956)
- Woody Woodpecker: (1941 short & 2017)
- Woody Woodpecker Goes to Camp (2024)
- The Woody Woodpecker Polka (1951)
- Woody's Kook-Out (1961)
- Woof-Woof (1964)
- The Wooing of Eve (1926)
- The Wool Cap (2004)
- Wooly Boys (2001)

==== Wor ====
- Word of God (2017)
- Word of Honor: (1981 & 2003)
- Word Is Out: Stories of Some of Our Lives (1977)
- Wordplay (2006)
- The Words (2012)
- Words of Advice: William S. Burroughs on the Road (2007)
- Words on Bathroom Walls (2020)
- Words for Battle (1941)
- Words in Blue (2005)
- Words with Gods (2014)
- Words and Music: (1929 & 1948)
- Words and Pictures (2013)
- Words of Witness (2012)
- Work (1915)
- Work Experience (1989)
- Work Is a Four-Letter Word (1968)
- The Work and the Glory (2004)
- Work It (2020)
- Work Weather Wife (2014)
- Workers Leaving the Lumière Factory (1895)
- Workhorse (2019)
- Working Class Boy (2018)
- The Working Class Goes to Heaven (1971)
- Working Girl (1988)
- Working Girls: (1931, 1986, 2010 & 2020)
- Working Man (2019)
- A Working Man (2025)
- Working Tra$h (1990) (TV)
- Working Woman (2018)
- Workingman's Death (2005)
- The World (2004)
- The World According to Garp (1982)
- A World Apart (1988)
- World Breaker (2026)
- World of the Dead: The Zombie Diaries (2011)
- World of Delight (2015)
- The World Gone Mad (1933)
- The World of Henry Orient (1964)
- The World in His Arms (1952)
- World in My Corner (1956)
- The World Is Not Enough (1999)
- World for Ransom (1954)
- The World of Suzie Wong (1960)
- World and Time Enough (1994)
- World Trade Center (2006)
- World War III (1998)
- World War Z (2013)
- World on a Wire (1973 TV)
- A World Without (2021)
- World Without End (1956)
- World Without Sun (1964)
- A World Without Thieves (2004)
- World's Biggest Gang Bang (1995)
- The World's End (2013)
- The World's Fastest Indian (2005)
- The World's Greatest Athlete (1973)
- World's Greatest Dad (2010)
- The World's Greatest Lover (1978)
- The World's Most Beautiful Swindlers (1964)
- The World's Strongest (1990)
- The World, the Flesh and the Devil: (1914 & 1959)
- The World, the Flesh, the Devil (1932)
- Worlds Apart: (1921, 2008 & 2015)
- Worm: (2006 & 2013)
- The Worst of Faces of Death (1987)
- Worst Friends: (2009 & 2014)
- The Worst Person in the World (2021)
- The Worst Witch (1986) (TV)
- Worth (2020)

==== Wot–Woz ====
- Wot a Night (1931)
- Wotakoi: Love Is Hard for Otaku (2020)
- Woubi Chéri (1998)
- Would You Believe It! (1929)
- Would You Have Sex with an Arab? (2011)
- Would You Marry Me? (1967)
- Would You Rather (2012)
- The Wound: (1998 & 2017)
- The Wound of Separation (1959)
- Wounded: (2007 & 2013)
- Wounded in Action (1944)
- The Wounded Angel (2016)
- Wounded Game (1977)
- Wounded Land (2015)
- The Wounded Man (1983)
- Wounds (2019)
- The Wounds (1998)
- Wow (1969)
- Wow, The Kid Gang of Bandits (1991)
- Woyzeck: (1979 & 1994)
- Wozzeck (1947)

=== Wr ===
==== Wra–Wre ====
- The Wraith (1986)
- The Wraith of Haddon Towers (1916)
- Wrangler: Anatomy of an Icon (2008)
- Wrangler's Roost (1941)
- Wrap Up (2007)
- Wrath (2011)
- The Wrath (2018)
- Wrath of the Dragon (2006)
- The Wrath of God (1972)
- Wrath of Gods (2006)
- The Wrath of the Gods (1914)
- Wrath of Love (1917)
- Wrath of Man (2021)
- Wrath of the Seas (1926)
- The Wrath of Silence (1994)
- Wrath of the Titans (2012)
- The Wrath of Vajra (2013)
- Wrathful Journey (1971)
- A Wreath in Time (1909)
- Wreaths at the Foot of the Mountain (1984)
- The Wreck: (1913 & 1927)
- A Wreck A Tangle (2000)
- The Wreck of the Dunbar or The Yeoman's Wedding (1912)
- The Wreck of the Hesperus: (1927 & 1948)
- Wreck-It Ralph (2012)
- The Wreck of the Mary Deare (1959)
- The Wreck in the North Sea (1915)
- The Wreck of the Singapore (1928)
- Wreckage (1925)
- Wrecked (2011)
- Wrecker (2015)
- The Wrecker: (1929, 1933 & 2025)
- Wreckers (2011)
- Wrecking Crew (1942)
- The Wrecking Crew: (1969, 2000, 2008 & 2026)
- Wreckless (1935)
- Wrestlemaniac (2006)
- The Wrestler: (1974 & 2008)
- The Wrestler and the Clown (1957)
- Wrestling: (1961 & 2008)
- Wrestling with Angels: Playwright Tony Kushner (2006)
- Wrestling Ernest Hemingway (1993)
- Wrestling Isn't Wrestling (2015)
- Wrestling Swordfish (1931)
- Wrestling Wrecks (1953)
- The Wretched (2019)
- Wretches (2018)
- The Wretches Are Still Singing (1979)
- Wretches & Jabberers (2010)

==== Wri ====
- The Wright Brothers (1971)
- The Wright Stuff (1996 TV)
- A Wrinkle in Time: (2003 TV & 2018)
- Wrinkles (2011)
- Wrinkles the Clown (2019)
- Wristcutters: A Love Story (2007)
- Write About Love (2019)
- Write or Dance (2016)
- Write Down, I Am an Arab (2014)
- Write and Fight (1985)
- Write When You Get Work (2018)
- The Writer with No Hands (2017)
- A Writer's Odyssey (2021)
- Writing on the City (2016)
- Writing with Fire (2021)
- The Writing on the Wall (1910)
- Written (2007)
- Written By (2009)
- The Written Law (1931)
- Written in the Stars (1925)
- Written on the Wind (1956)

==== Wro–Wrz ====
- Wrong (2013)
- Wrong Again (1929)
- The Wrong Arm of the Law (1963)
- The Wrong Birds (1914)
- The Wrong Bottle (1913)
- The Wrong Box (1966)
- Wrong Connection (1977)
- Wrong Cops (2013)
- The Wrong Couples (1987)
- The Wrong Ferarri (2011)
- The Wrong Girl (1999)
- The Wrong Girls (2026)
- The Wrong Guy (1997)
- The Wrong Guys (1988)
- The Wrong Husband (1931)
- The Wrong Man: (1917, 1956 & 1993)
- The Wrong Missy (2020)
- The Wrong Mr. Perkins (1931)
- The Wrong Mr. Wright (1927)
- The Wrong Move (1975)
- Wrong No. (2015)
- Wrong No. 2 (2019)
- Wrong Number (2004)
- Wrong Number, Miss (1932)
- Wrong Place (2022)
- Wrong Is Right (1982)
- The Wrong Road (1937)
- Wrong Rosary (2009)
- Wrong Side Raju (2016)
- Wrong Side of the Road (1981)
- Wrong Side of Town (2010)
- Wrong Side Up (2005)
- Wrong Turn series:
  - Wrong Turn: (2003 & 2021)
  - Wrong Turn 2: Dead End (2007)
  - Wrong Turn 3: Left for Dead (2009)
  - Wrong Turn 4: Bloody Beginnings (2011)
  - Wrong Turn 5: Bloodlines (2012)
  - Wrong Turn 6: Last Resort (2014)
- Wrong Turn at Tahoe (2009)
- A Wrong Way to Love (1969)
- Wrong Way Kid (1983)
- The Wrong Woman (1995)
- Wrong World (1985)
- The Wronged Man (2010) (TV)
- Wrongfully Accused (1998)
- Wrzos (1938)

=== Ws–Wy ===
- Wsród nocnej ciszy (1978)
- Wu Dang (2012)
- Wu Kong (2017)
- Wubbzy's Big Movie! (2008)
- Wunschkonzert (1940)
- Wuthering Heights: (1920, 1939, 1948 TV, 1953 TV, 1954, 1959 TV, 1970, 1988, 1992, 1998 TV, 2003 TV, 2011 & 2026)
- Wyatt Earp (1994)
- Wyatt Earp: Return to Tombstone (1994 TV)
- Wyatt Earp's Revenge (2012)
- Wynken, Blynken and Nod (1938)
- Wyoming: (1928, 1940 & 1947)
- The Wyoming Bandit (1949)
- Wyoming Mail (1950)
- Wyoming Outlaw (1939)
- Wyoming Renegades (1954)
- Wyoming Wildcat (1941)
- The Wyoming Wildcat (1925)
- Wyrmwood: Road of the Dead (2014)
- Wyscig pokoju – Warszawa-Berlin-Praga (1952)
- Wyvern (2009 TV)
- The Wyvern Mystery (2000)

Previous: List of films: T Next: List of films: X–Z

== See also ==
- Lists of films
- Lists of actors
- List of film and television directors
- List of documentary films
- List of film production companies
