= Eurovision Debate =

- Also known as: Eurovision Presidential Debate; European Commission Presidential Debate
- Genre: Topical debate
- Directed by: Rob Hopkin (2014)
- Starring: Candidates for the Presidency of the European Commission
- Original language: English
- No. of episodes: 3 editions

Production
- Production locations: Espace Léopold, Brussels, Belgium
- Running time: ~90 minutes
- Production company: European Broadcasting Union

Original release
- Release: 15 May 2014
- Release: 15 May 2019
- Release: 23 May 2024

The Eurovision Debate is a live televised debate between the lead political candidates ("Spitzenkandidaten") running to be the next President of the European Commission. Produced by the European Broadcasting Union (EBU) and broadcast across Europe via the Eurovision network, the debate is hosted by the European Parliament in Brussels, Belgium. The aim of the debate is to help public service media play their role in the democratic process by helping to better inform citizens and encouraging participation in the elections.

== History ==
The first Eurovision Debate took place on 15 May 2014 and was the first-ever live televised format to bring democratic political debate to a pan-European level. Italian journalist and Director of the Rai News24 Monica Maggioni moderated the debate with RTÉ's Conor McNally as its social media co-presenter. The Eurovision Debate is produced by the EBU under the guidance and the supervision of senior editors from European Public Service Media (the "Editorial Board") and was directed by Rob Hopkin.

The 2019 edition was broadcast live from the European Parliament in Brussels on 15 May 2019 at 21:00 CET, moderated by TV anchors Markus Preiss (ARD/WDR), Émilie Tran Nguyen (France Télévisions) and Annastiina Heikkilä (Yle) and broadcast by the EBU's public service media members and others throughout Europe. During the 90-minute debate, the following issues were addressed: migration, unemployment, security and climate change, and the role of Europe in the world. In fact, the debate was more about the common minimum wage, the European business tax, the reduction of greenhouse gas emissions, the border control associated with solidarity, and the use of trade to improve working conditions in Europe.

In the lead up to the EU Elections in June 2024, the Eurovision Debate was held at the European Parliament building in Brussels on 23 May 2024. The debate commenced at 15:00 CET, with Martin Řezníček (Czech TV, Czechia) and Annelies Beck (VRT, Belgium) moderating the debate between the five candidates. The topics chosen for the debate were Economy and Jobs, Defence and Security, Climate and Environment, Democracy and Leadership, Migration and Borders, and Innovation and Technology. In a first, the Eurovision Debate introduced ‘spotlight’ segments where each candidate faced 1:1 questioning by the moderators. The position of candidates on set and the speaking orders for each topic and spotlight interviews were decided through an allocation draw on 16 May. In the 2024 edition of the debate, the EBU also provided viewers an opportunity to submit questions to the candidates using the hashtag #EurovisionDebate. Questions were also asked by the audience in the plenary chamber and by viewers watching from events organised by the Parliament’s Liaison Offices in EU member states.

== Format ==
The debate is presented by 2 television anchor personalities from public service media organisations who ask the candidates on stage a series of questions on pre-determined themes, although the questions themselves are not known in advance. The debate obeys strict rules of transparency and neutrality and all candidates are allocated the same speaking time. Interpretation is provided in all official languages of the EU, and the International Sign Language.

The order in which the candidates take the floor is decided by a draw which happens shortly before the debate itself. The Eurovision Debate also uses social media to spark debate among citizens throughout Europe around issues that are topical for the European Parliament elections. In 2019, a third anchor person monitored the exchanges online and reported to the journalists on stage so that the social media dimension was taken into account during the discussions. This element was dropped for the 2024 debate given the direct involvement of voters in the audience and from the live events around the EU.

In 2024 a draw was held on May 16 to determine the order of the candidates on stage, the order that the candidates would answer the question in each topic segment and the order in which the candidates would join the Spotlight interview section.

== Candidates ==
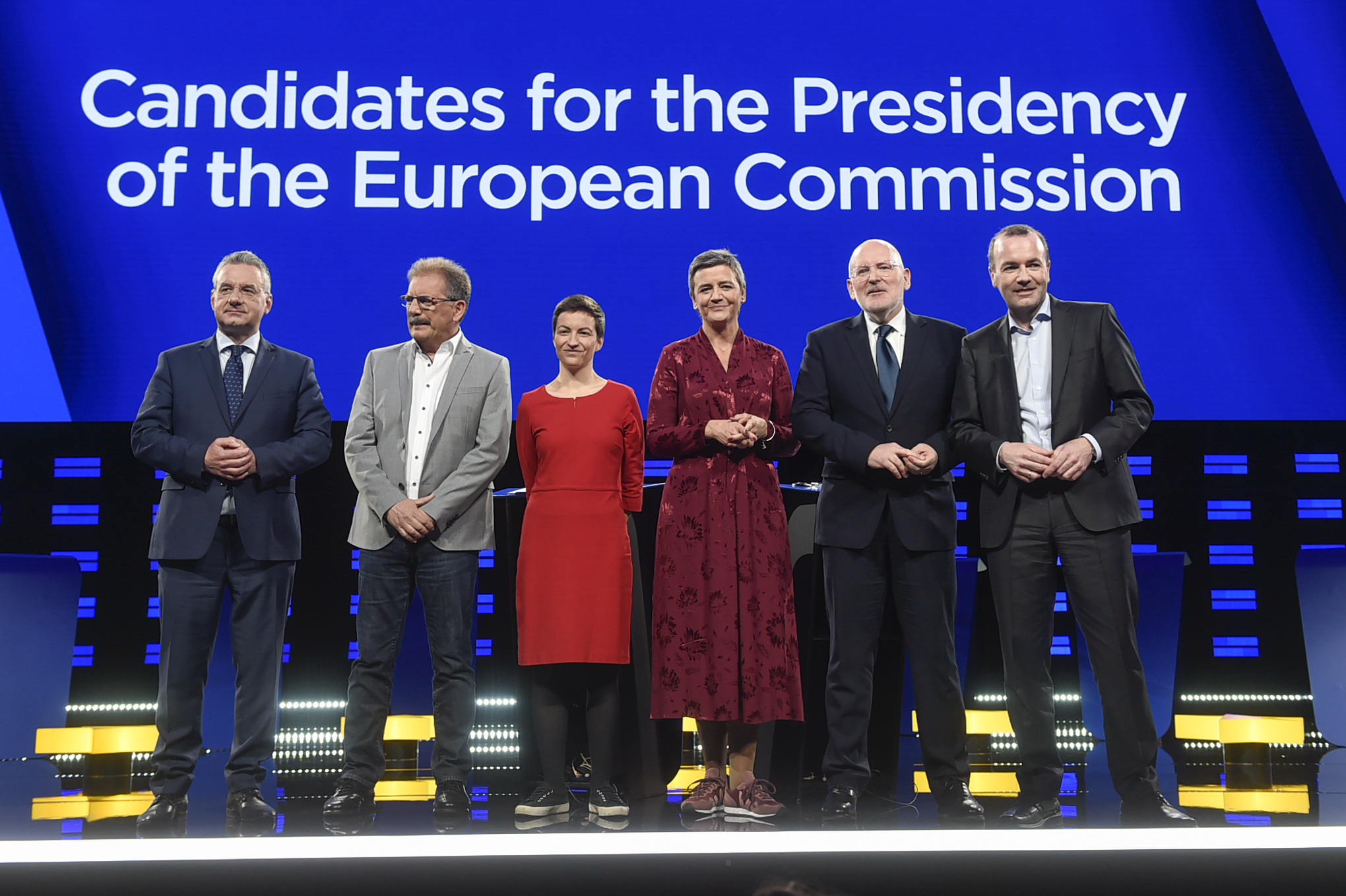
2019 Eurovision Debate candidates on stage. Left to right: Zahradil, Cué, Keller, Vestager, Timmermans, Weber.

=== 2014 ===
1. Alexis Tsipras (Greece, European Left)
2. Ska Keller (Germany, European Green Party)
3. Martin Schulz (Germany, Party of European Socialists)
4. Jean-Claude Juncker (Luxembourg, European People's Party)
5. Guy Verhofstadt (Belgium, Alliance of Liberals and Democrats for Europe)

=== 2019 ===
The speaking order and the placing of the lead candidates were decided at the allocation draw held on 4 April

1. Nico Cué (Spain, European Left)
2. Ska Keller (Germany, European Green Party)
3. Jan Zahradil (Czech Republic, Alliance of Conservatives and Reformists in Europe)
4. Margrethe Vestager (Denmark, Alliance of Liberals and Democrats for Europe)
5. Manfred Weber (Germany, European People's Party)
6. Frans Timmermans (Netherlands, Party of European Socialists)

=== 2024 ===
The lead candidates who took part in the 2024 debate (order on stage)

1. Ursula von der Leyen (Germany, European People's Party)
2. Nicolas Schmit (Luxembourg, Party of European Socialists)
3. Terry Reintke (Germany, European Green Party)
4. Sandro Gozi (Italy, European Democratic Party)
5. Walter Baier (Austria, Party of the European Left)

The European Conservatives and Reformists (ECR) and Identity and Democracy (ID) did not nominate lead candidates for the Presidency of the European Commission and were therefore not eligible to take part in the 2024 Eurovision Debate.

== Broadcast ==
The debate is broadcast in more than 27 countries on TV and Radio and can be viewed online on the EBU’s website. For the 2019 edition, the following channels and broadcasters aired the debate:

Broadcasters aired the 2019 debate
Country	Broadcaster(s)
Azerbaijan	İTV
Belgium	VRT
Belgium	RTBF
Bulgaria	BNT
Croatia	HRT
Czechia	ČT
Denmark	DRTV
Estonia	ERR
France	France Info
France	Arte
France	Public Sénat
France	TV5Monde
Finland	Yle
Georgia	GPB
Germany	Phoenix
Greece	ERT
Ireland	RTÉ News Now
Italy	Rai News 24
Netherlands	NPO
Poland	TVP
Poland	PR
Romania	TVR
Spain	RTVE Canal 24h
Spain	TvG2
Spain	Canal Sur 2
Sweden	SVT
United Kingdom	BBC Parliament
United States	Kingston TV

== See also ==
- 2014 European Parliament election
- 2019 European Parliament election
- 2024 European Parliament election
