= Spitzenkandidat =

European political process

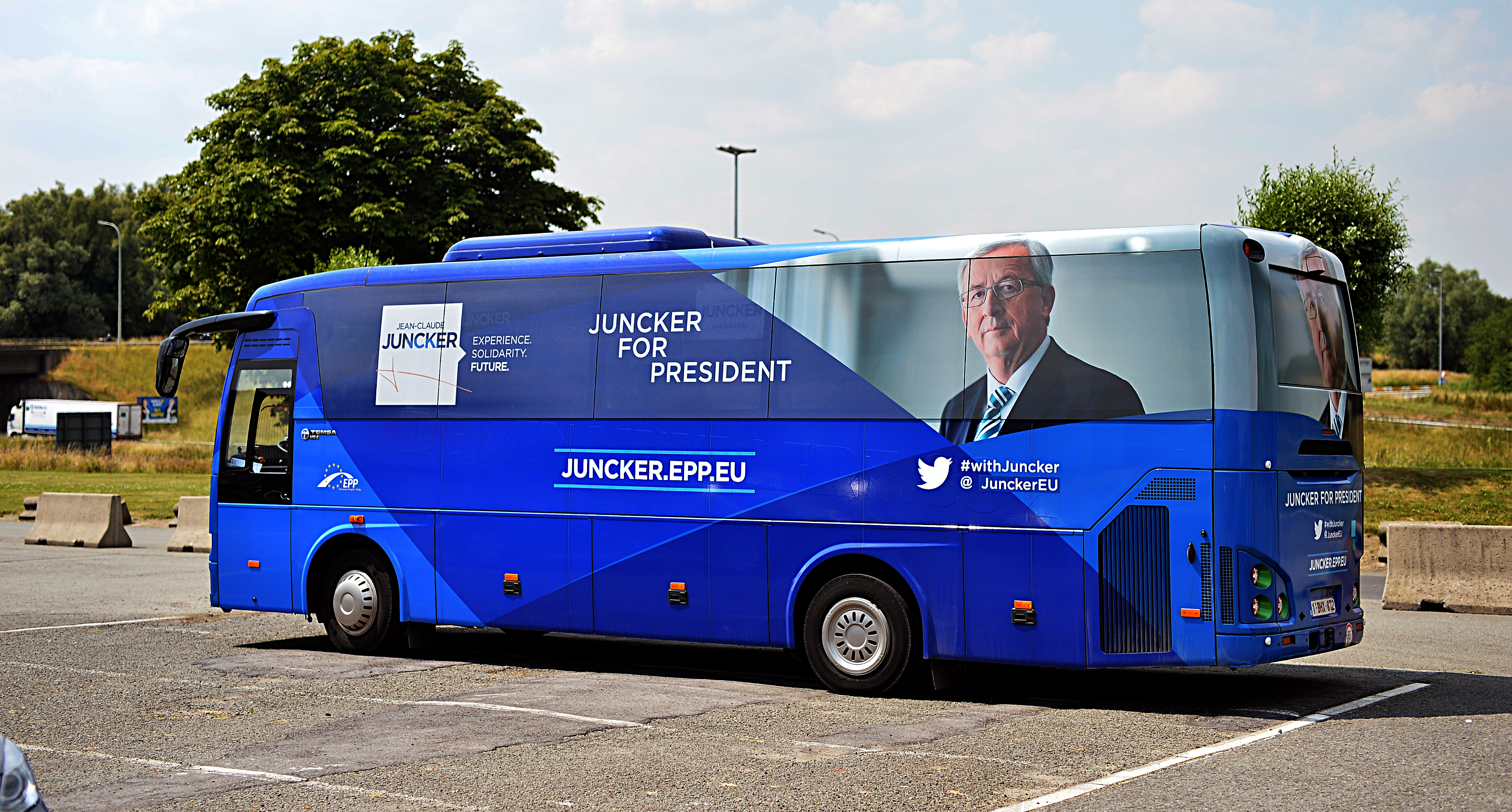
For the first time, prior to the 2014 election presidential candidates were nominated. This enabled them to present election programmes and campaign for the position (the EPP campaign bus of Jean-Claude Juncker depicted).

The Spitzenkandidat process (German: [ˈʃpɪt͡sn̩kandiˌdaːt], German for 'lead candidate') is the method of linking the choice of President of the Commission to the outcome of the European Parliament elections, with each major European political party (not to be confused with the political groups of the European Parliament) nominating their candidate for Commission President prior to the Parliamentary elections. The Spitzenkandidat of the largest party (or the one able to secure the support of a majority coalition) would then be proposed by the European Council to the European Parliament for election to the Commission Presidency.

This process was first followed in 2014, though its legitimacy was contested by some of the members of the European Council (with the UK and Hungarian Prime Ministers voting against the nomination of the EPP's Spitzenkandidat Jean-Claude Juncker).

European Parliament elections and the Spitzenkandidat process
Election	Spitzenkandidat process adhered to?	Notes
2014 election	Yes	Jean-Claude Juncker (EPP) was nominated and elected Commission President.
2019 election	No	Ursula von der Leyen (EPP) was elected despite Manfred Weber being nominated as the EPP Spitzenkandidat.
2024 election	Yes	Incumbent Ursula von der Leyen (EPP) was the Spitzenkandidat and re-elected Commission President.

== Background ==
According to the treaties, the President of the European Commission is nominated by the European Council. Since the entry into force of the Lisbon Treaty in 2009, this nomination has to be made in light of the results of the European Parliament election, and the nominee has to be backed by a majority of Members of the European Parliament in a vote to elect him/her as president.

Already in 2004 the centre-right EPP argued that, as the largest party, an EPP member should be nominated, and indeed the European Council put forward José Manuel Barroso.

The approach of national governments was traditionally to appoint the various high-profile jobs in EU institutions (European Council president, High Representative and so on) dividing them accordingly along geographic, political and gender lines. This sometimes led to fairly low-profile figures, avoiding candidates who had either made enemies of some national governments or who were seen as potentially challenging the council or certain member states.

=== Article 17.7 ===
Unease had built up around the secretive power play that was involved in these appointments, leading to a desire for a more democratic process. At the end of 2009, the Treaty of Lisbon entered into force. It amended the appointment of the Commission President in the Treaty on European Union Article 17.7 to add the wording "taking into account the elections to the European Parliament", so that Article 17.7 now included the wording

Taking into account the elections to the European Parliament and after having held the appropriate consultations, the European Council, acting by a qualified majority, shall propose to the European Parliament a candidate for President of the Commission. This candidate shall be elected by the European Parliament by a majority of its component members. If he does not obtain the required majority, the European Council, acting by a qualified majority, shall within one month propose a new candidate who shall be elected by the European Parliament following the same procedure.

=== 2014 election ===
In 2013, in preparation for the European election of 2014, Martin Schulz, then President of the European Parliament campaigned for European political parties to name lead candidates for the post of President of the European Commission; his own party, the centre-left Party of European Socialists named Schulz as its lead candidate (German: Spitzenkandidat). The EPP held an election Congress in Dublin, where Jean-Claude Juncker beat his rival Michel Barnier and subsequently ran as the EPP lead candidate. The European Left Party (GUE/NGL) chose Alexis Tsipras as candidate. The Alliance of Liberals and Democrats for Europe Party and the European Green Party also selected lead candidates. The Alliance of European Conservatives and Reformists did not name a candidate, objecting to the principle of Spitzenkandidaten and its "tenuous" basis in law. The German term for lead candidates caught on, and they became known informally as Spitzenkandidaten.

The EPP won a relative majority (29%) in the 2014 election, and Jean-Claude Juncker, its lead candidate, was nominated by the European Council. British Prime Minister David Cameron and Hungarian Prime Minister Viktor Orbán were the only members of the council to object to his selection. After negotiations with other parties (and their corresponding political Groups in the European Parliament), Juncker was duly elected as Commission President by the Parliament in July 2014 by 422 votes to 250.

=== 2019 election ===
European political parties again put forward their candidates for Commission President ahead of the elections and debates were held among them. The EPP nominated the leader of their Group in the European Parliament, Manfred Weber. The PES put forward the Vice President of the outgoing European Commission, Frans Timmermans. Other parties also put forward candidates, including the Alliance of European Conservatives and Reformists who had declined to do so in the previous elections.

The EPP again won the most seats in the elections, but Weber was unable to secure support from other parties. Timmermans seemed more likely to build a coalition of cross-party support. The most senior EPP head of government, Merkel, at first accepted that it should be Timmermans on the margins of the G20 summit in Osaka on 28–29 June, but a number of other EPP leaders did not follow her. It took two meetings of the European Council to agree on who to propose to the European Parliament. Negotiations within the European Council were on a party-to-party basis (the Croatian and Latvian Prime Ministers led the negotiations for the EPP, the Spanish and Portuguese Prime Ministers for the Socialists, and the Belgian and Dutch Prime Ministers for the Liberals).

Agreement was eventually reached on a compromise candidate for Commission President, Ursula von der Leyen (EPP). The PES was compensated by Timmermans becoming First Vice President able to choose his own portfolio and Josep Borrell becoming High Representative for Foreign Affairs, and the Liberals (whose support was now necessary as the EPP and the socialists no longer had a majority together in the EP) by Charles Michel becoming President of the European Council.

Despite misgivings among some of the Socialist MEPs, the European Parliament elected von der Leyen in July 2019 by 383 votes to 327. Given that the treaty requires a majority of component members of the Parliament (i.e. abstentions and absences effectively count against) to support the President, she was elected with only 9 votes above that threshold (of, at the time, 374 votes).

=== 2024 election ===
The apparent failure of the system in 2019 led some to believe a similar situation could lead its abandonment, although this ultimately did not occur as the majority of parties (excepting ECR and ID) nominated a Spitzenkandidat. Nominations included Ursula von der Leyen (EPP), Nicolas Schmit (S&D), Marie-Agnes Strack-Zimmermann (Renew), Terry Reintke (Greens/EFA), and Walter Baier (The Left).

The election saw a surge in support for the far-right, with the AP reporting that 25% of MEPs belonged to hard-right parties, at the cost of centrist groups. There was speculation as to whether von der Leyen, who the EPP had nominated to serve a second term, would be able to get the votes to continue her presidency - ultimately, successful talks with S&D, Renew and the Greens led to her re-election with 401 votes to 318. (Note: European President elections require a majority rather than a plurality, meaning abstensions and invalid votes effectively count against. This figure includes 284 votes against, 12 abstensions, and 22 blank/invalid votes. Ballots are also secret, so the specifics of the coalition are not known.)

== Debates ==
European Commission presidency candidates have each time participated in televised debates, including the Eurovision Debate, hosted and broadcast by the European Broadcasting Union (EBU) and at other public venues, including a now traditional debate organised and hosted by Maastricht University.

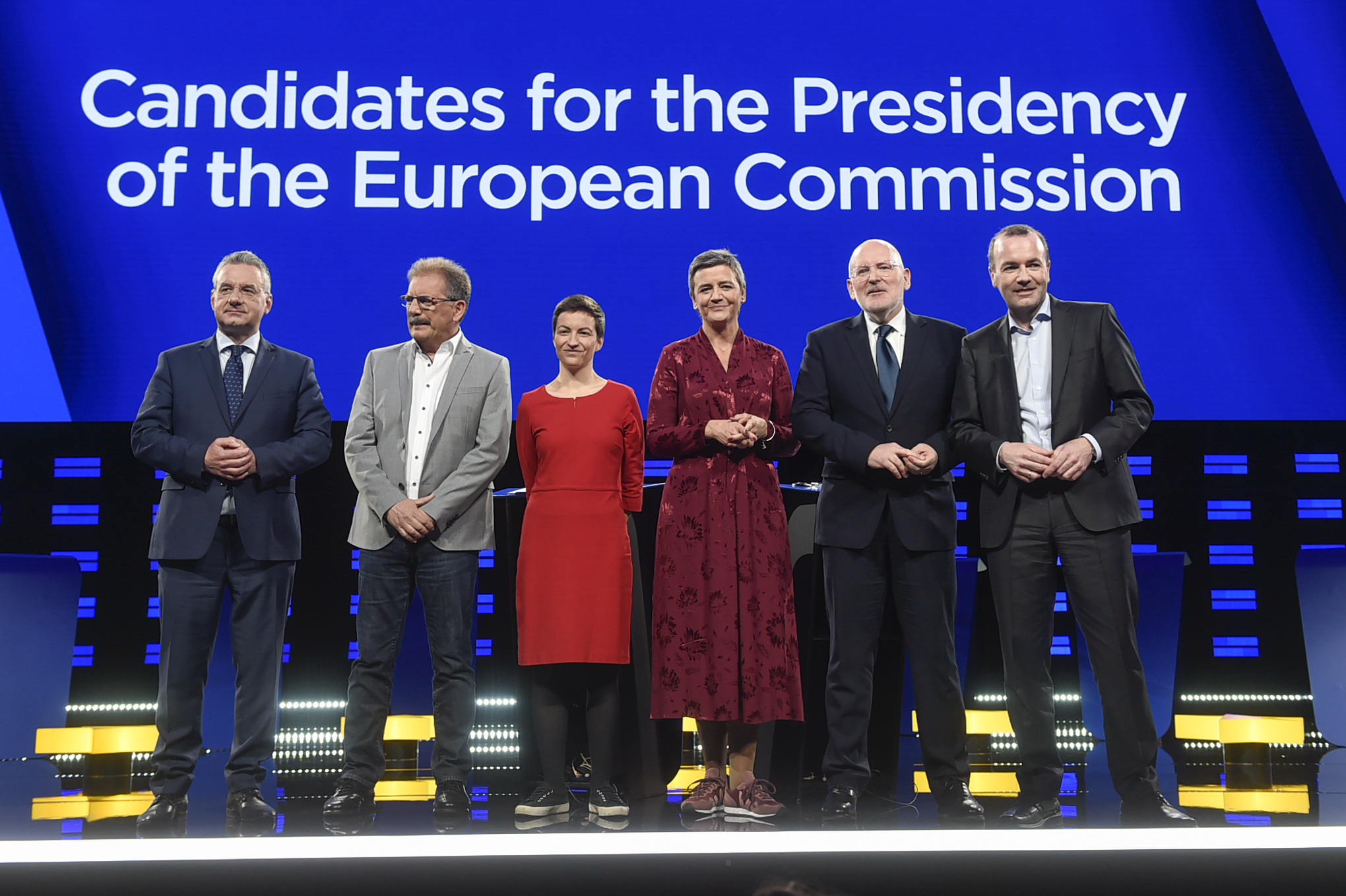
European Commission presidency candidates at Eurovision Debate (May 2019). Left to right: Zahradil, Cué, Keller, Vestager, Timmermans, Weber

== Criticism ==
Some commentators argued that wording of Article 17.7 obliging the European Council to take account of the results of the elections to the European Parliament does not necessarily mean that it should take heed of the party candidates for president, as such an interpretation would amount to a "power grab" at the expense of the European Council. They argued that the European Council found itself taken off guard by how the process took off, and had backed themselves into a corner in having to approve the candidate of the largest party. Following the appointment, leaders vowed to review the process.

On the other hand, it has also been pointed out that members of the European Council were themselves involved in choosing the Spitzenkandidat of their respective parties. For example, Jean-Claude Juncker was chosen as the EPP's candidate by the party congress in Dublin with the participation of EPP European Council members such as Angela Merkel, Mariano Rajoy and Enda Kenny.

Others have argued that the Spitzenkandidat-process is still insufficiently democratic and needs to be replaced with a more direct system. Some suggestions toward this have been electing the president via a transnational list, having a direct election, and holding primary elections. Parliamentary proposals to enact some of these in advance of the 2019 election have been opposed by some in the council.

== See also ==
- President of the European Commission
- Presidents of the European Union
- Elections to the European Parliament
