= WMD-The Inside Story =

2008 film directed by David Holroyd

wmd.
- Directed by: David Holroyd
- Written by: David Holroyd
- Produced by: Christine Hartland and David Holroyd
- Starring: Simon Lenagan and Montserrat Roig de Puig
- Release date: December 2008
- Country: United Kingdom
- Language: English

wmd. (also known as wmd-The Inside Story.) is a political thriller released in December 2008 focused on the falsification of evidence in the build-up to the Iraq War. The film is shot entirely from a CCTV/spy-camera perspective and follows the story of an ordinary MI6 desk officer who accidentally discovers that the American and British governments are doctoring the facts in order to convince us that invading Iraq is justifiable. Although the story of the MI6 desk officer is fictionalized, the film is based on hard evidence that has surfaced and continues to surface, since the invasion began.

wmd. is written and directed by David Holroyd, and produced by Christine Hartland and David Holroyd. The film stars Simon Lenagan and Montserrat Roig de Puig.

== Distribution ==
wmd. is one of the first, if not the first, British independent films to be initially, and exclusively, released digitally. It was first released on Dailymotion on 6 December 2008 in conjunction with an off-line premiere at the Brighton Film Festival. The film proved so popular on Dailymotion that its run was extended several days, it became the most successful premiere ever on Dailymotion, and it was picked up by the platform for release in 16 countries.
