= Union of the Belgian Metal Industry =

Trade union in Belgium

The Union of Belgian Metalworkers (Dutch: Centrale der Metaalindustrie van België, CMB; French: Centrale de l´Industrie du Métal de Belgique is a trade union representing workers in metal and related trades in Belgium.

== History ==
The union was founded on 12 and 13 September 1886, when fourteen local trade unions met in Brussels and formed the National Federation of Metalworkers. One of the first industrial unions in the country, it initially had 1,706 members. It operated as a loose federation, and various affiliates joined and left over the first few years, but with a general upward trend.

In 1893, the union took part in the Belgian general strike for universal suffrage. Following the strike, unions were repressed, and membership of the metalworkers' federation dropped. However, it gradually rebuilt, launching a monthly magazine in 1899, and establishing pension and welfare funds for members. By 1901, it had reached a new high of 7,500 members.

By 1911, the union had 16,804 members. It adopted a more centralised structure, renamed itself as the "Union of Belgian Metalworkers", and affiliated to the Belgian Workers' Party. It was largely inactive during World War I, and after the war, its campaigns for an eight-hour day, minimum wage and union recognition led to widespread strikes. These were resolved in 1919, when a joint consultative committee for the metal industry was established, the first such committee in Belgium. This led to a rapid increase in union membership, which reached 139,413 in 1920, and the union played a major role in the general strikes of 1925 and 1936.

The union was divided during World War II, with some leaders joining Nazi front unions, while others opposed these, and some broke away to work with the communist resistance. The communist unions rejoined in 1945, and that year, the union became a founding constituent of the General Federation of Belgian Labour.

After the war, the union engaged in frequent industrial action, but became divided between Flemish and Walloon leaders, who were also split over how closely to engage with Parliamentary action. This was largely resolved by the late 1960s, and membership reached a record high of 216,490 in 1976, but the union then struggled against job losses in the industry. By 1995, it was down to 164,267 members, and the following year, it renamed itself as the Union of the Belgian Metal Industry.

In 2006, the union gave its Flemish and Walloon regions high levels of autonomy, with only a small federal structure uniting the two. The post of president was abolished, and the union was instead jointly run by two general secretaries, one from each region.

== Leadership ==
=== General Secretaries ===
1888: Evarist Pierron
1898: Theodoor Bekaert
1898: Jules Solau
1930: Georges Keuwet
1946: Raymond Latin
1961: Gust Wallaert
1973: Roger Vandeperre
1977: Fernand Decoster
1986: Germain Duhin
1990: Michel Cossaer
1993: Herwig Jorissen
1997: Nico Cué and Herwig Jorissen
1999: Nico Cué and Michel Maton
2006: Nico Cué and Herwig Jorissen
2018: Nico Cué and Georges De Batselier

=== Presidents ===
1991: Michel Cossaer
1994: Jacques Fontaine
1999: Herwig Jorissen
