= 2019 European Parliament election =

- 23–26 May 2019

All 751 seats to the European Parliament 376 seats needed for a majority
- Turnout: 198,352,638 (50.66% ▲8.01 pp)
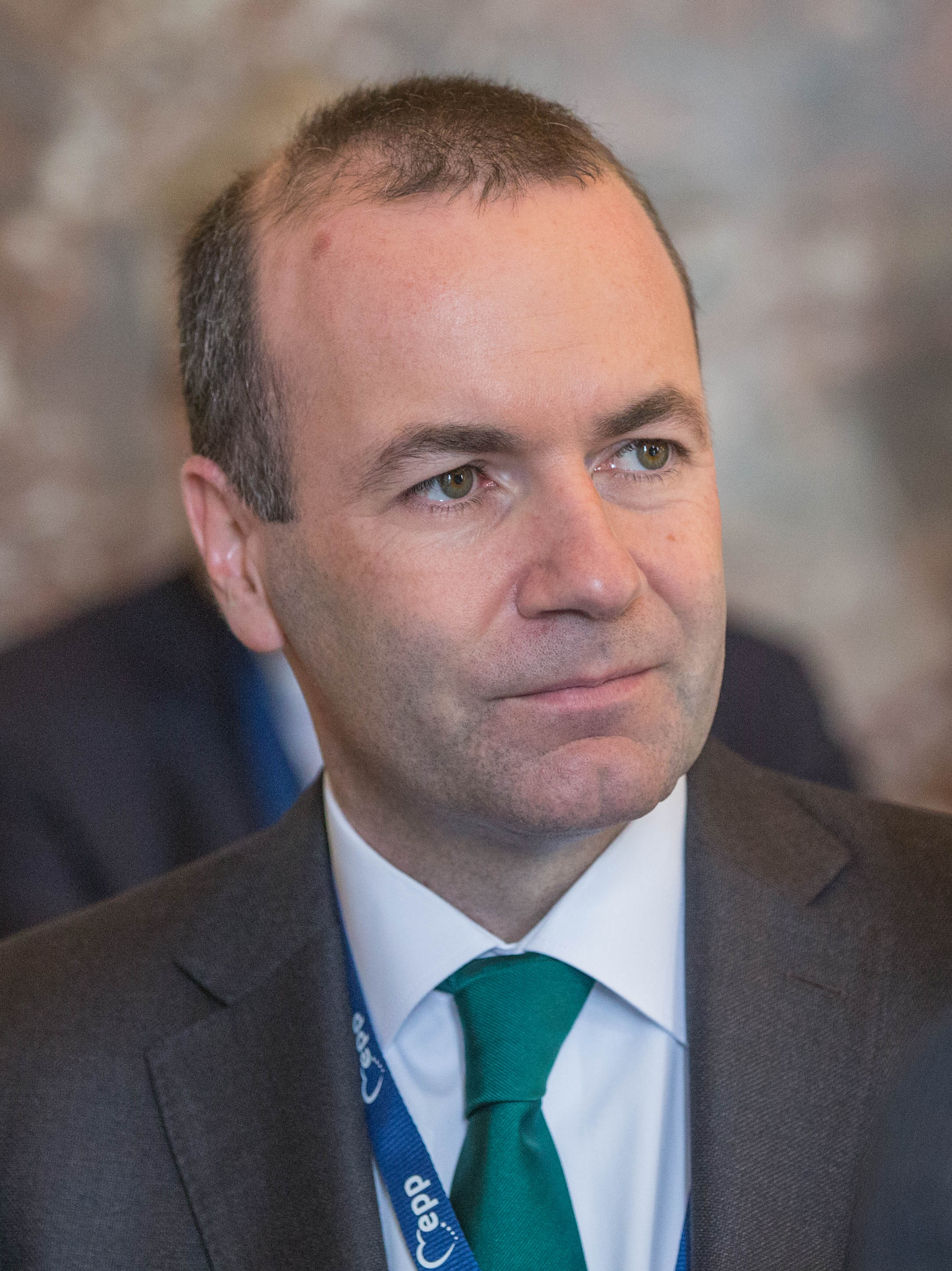

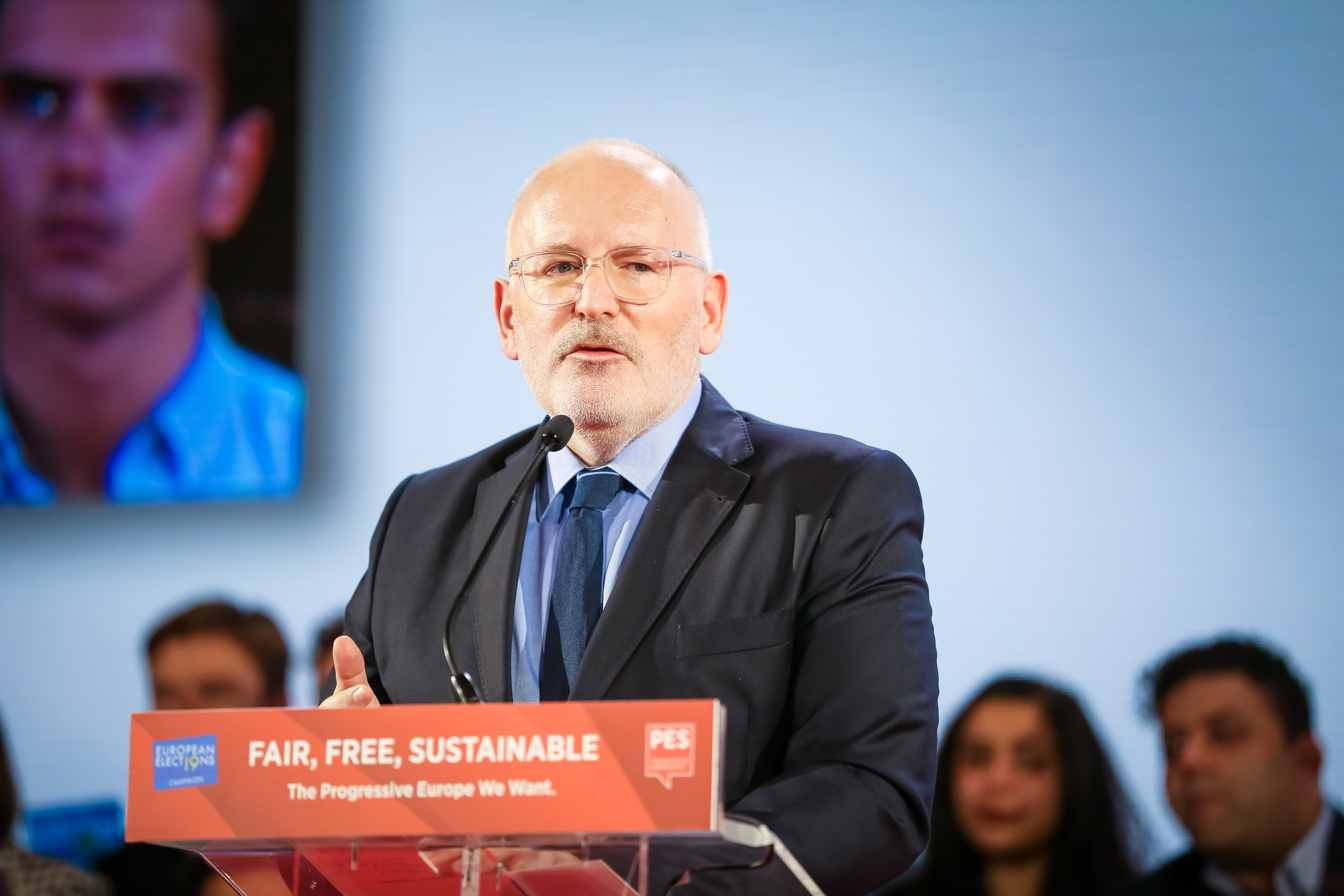

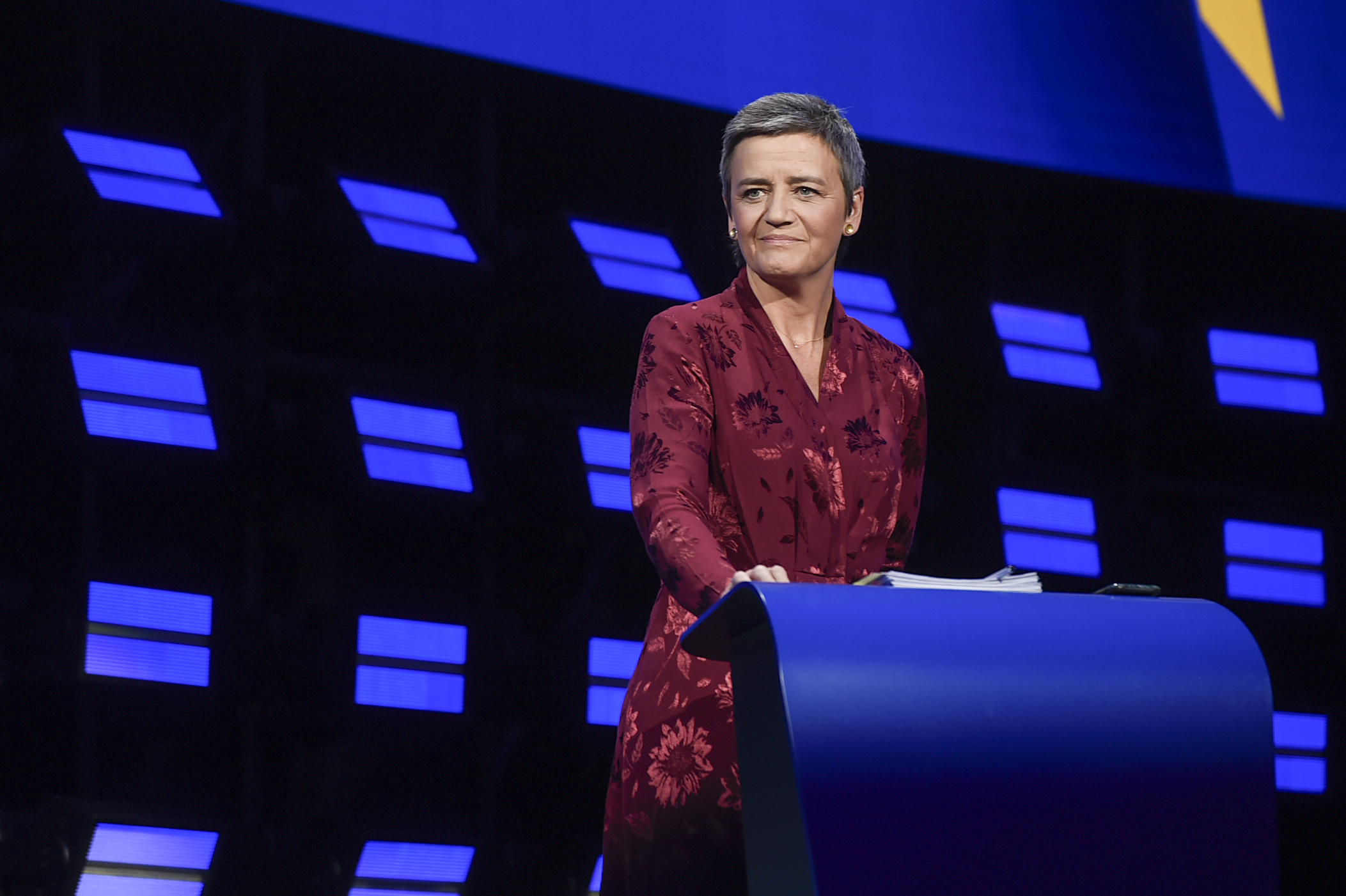

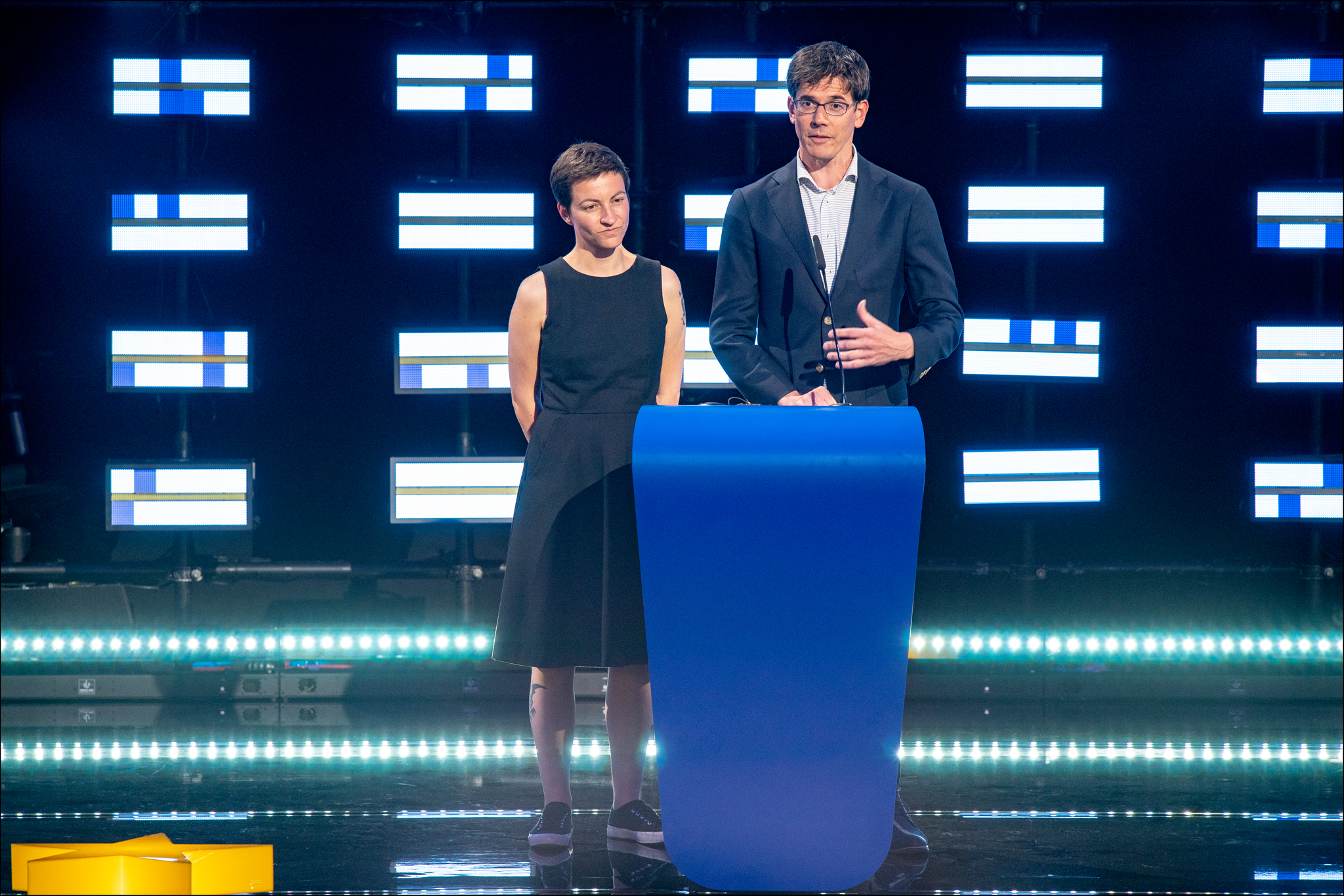

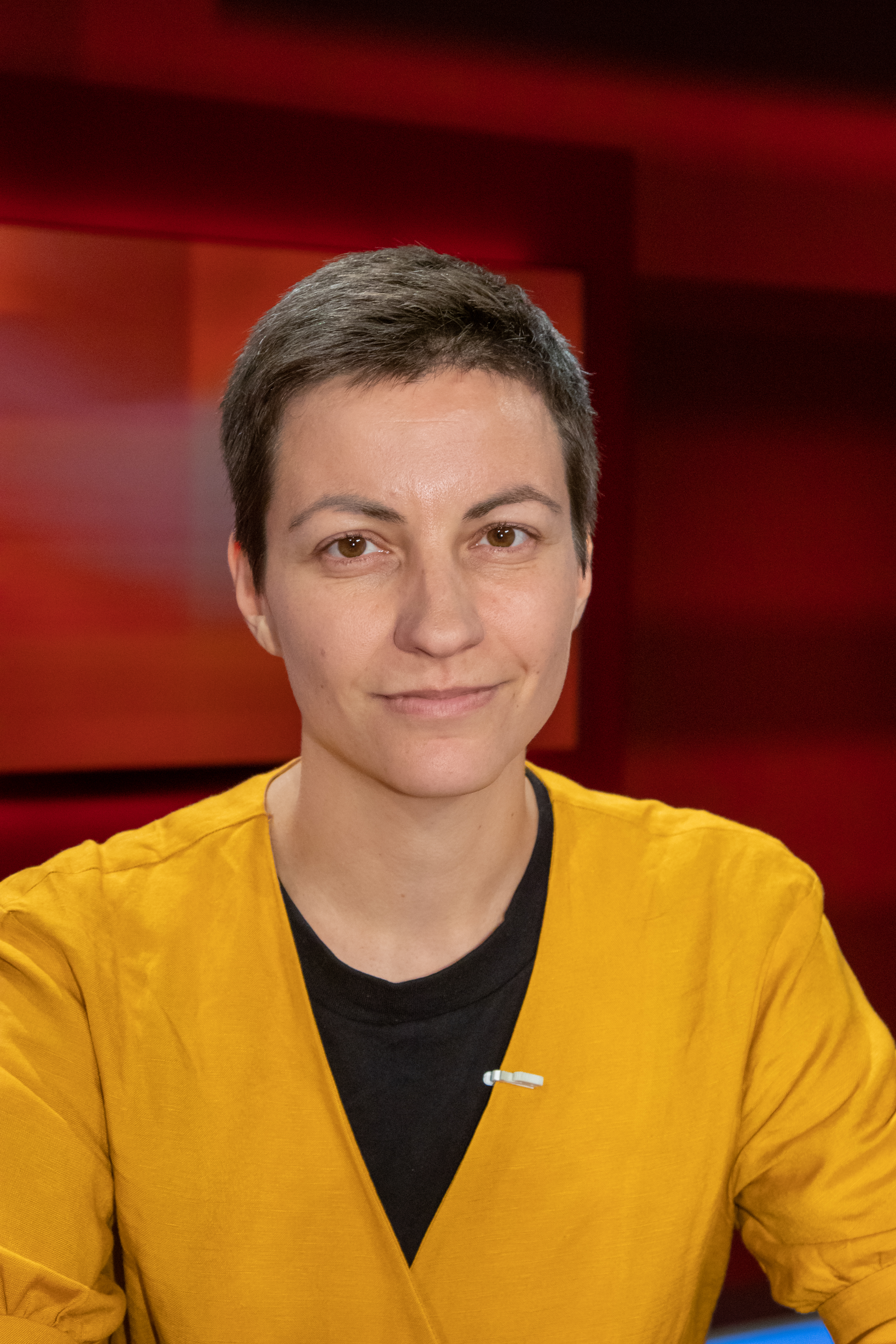

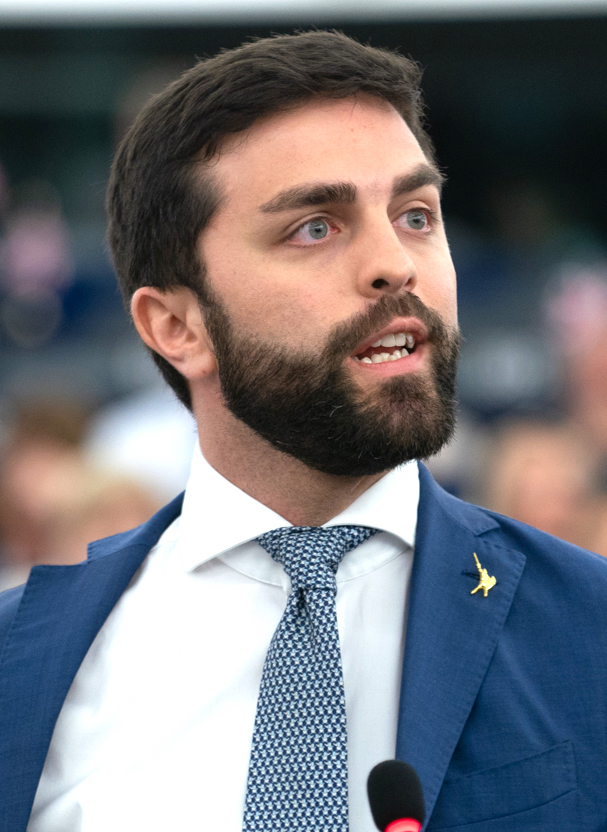

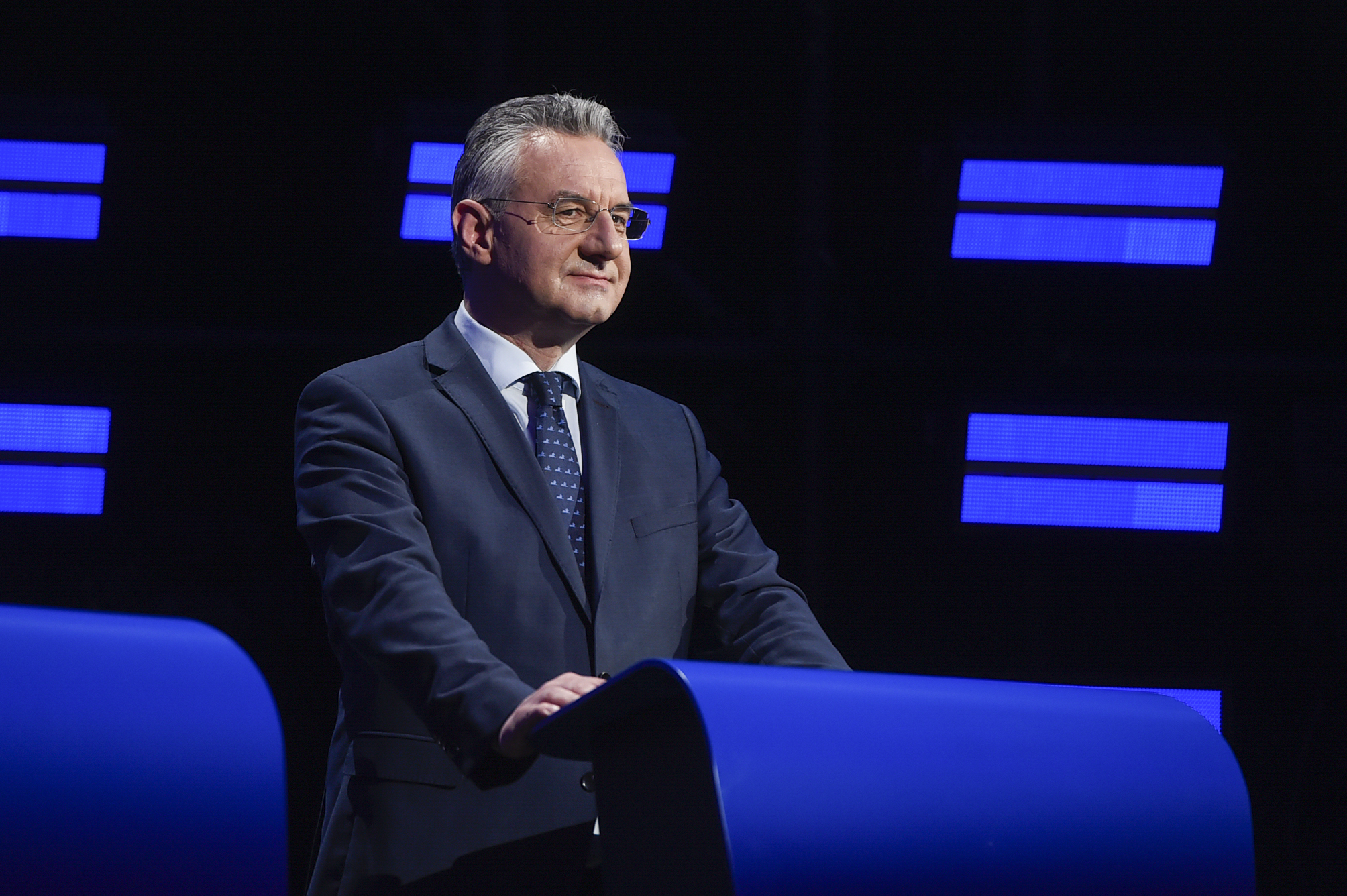

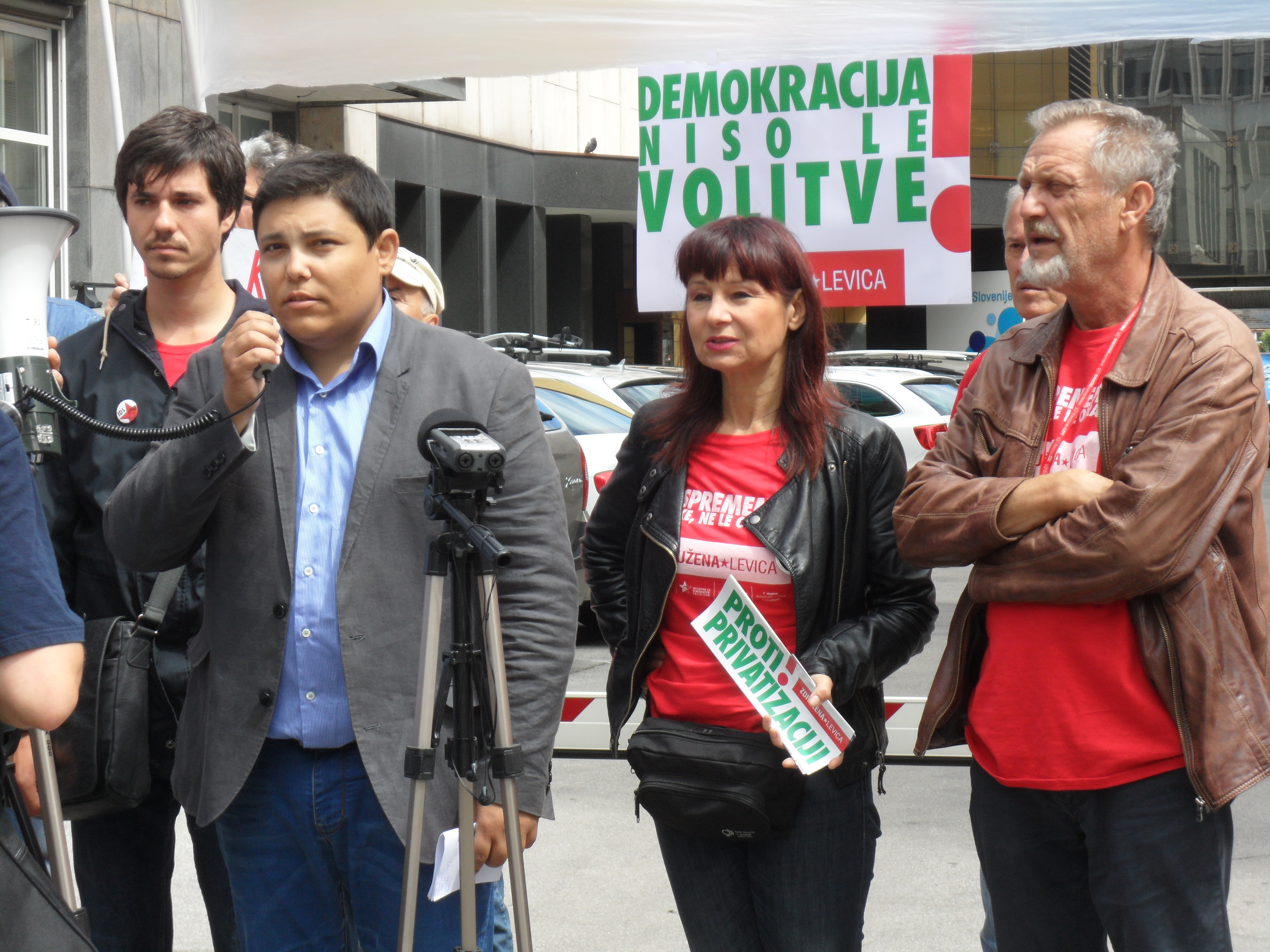

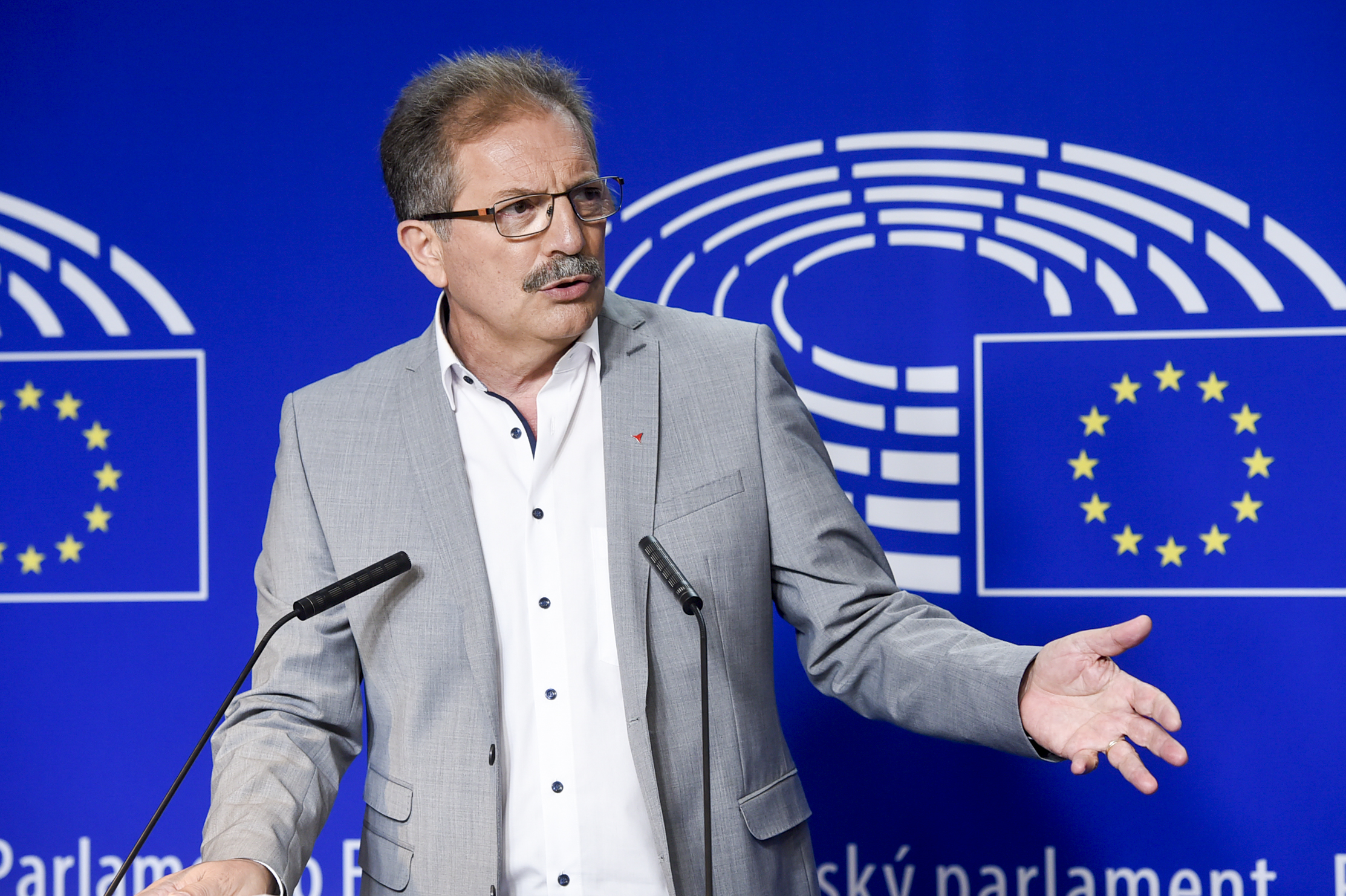
Leader	Manfred Weber	Frans Timmermans	Margrethe Vestager
Alliance	EPP	S&D	Renew
Leader's seat	Germany	Netherlands	Did not run
Last election	221 seats, 23.8%	191 seats, 24.4%	67 seats, 7.0%
Seats before	216	185	69
Seats won	182	154	108
Seat change	▼34	▼31	▲39
Popular vote	41,211,023	35,421,084	23,788,652
Percentage	21.0%	18.5%	13.0%
Swing	▼2.8%	▼5.9%	▲6.0%
Leader	Bas Eickhout; Ska Keller	Marco Zanni	Jan Zahradil
Alliance	Greens/EFA	ID	ECR
Leader's seat	Netherlands; Germany	North-West Italy	Czech Republic
Last election	50 seats, 7.3%	New group	70 seats, 5.2%
Seats before	52	36	77
Seats won	74	73	62
Seat change	▲22	▲37	▼15
Popular vote	19,886,513	20,980,853	14,207,477
Percentage	11.7%	10.8%	8.2%
Swing	▲4.4%	New group	▲3.0%
Leader	Violeta Tomić; Nico Cué
Alliance	GUE/NGL
Leader's seat	Slovenia; Did not run
Last election	52 seats, 5.6%
Seats before	52
Seats won	41
Seat change	▼11
Popular vote	10,219,537
Percentage	6.5%
Swing	▲0.9%
- Post-election composition of each member state's delegation
President of the European Commission before election
Jean-Claude Juncker
EPP
President of the European Commission after election
Ursula von der Leyen
EPP

The 2019 European Parliament election was held in the European Union (EU) between 23 and 26 May 2019. It was the ninth parliamentary election since the first direct elections in 1979. A total of 751 Members of the European Parliament (MEPs) were elected to represent more than 512 million people from 28 member states. In February 2018, the European Parliament had voted to decrease the number of MEPs from 751 to 705 if the United Kingdom were to withdraw from the European Union on 29 March 2019. However, the United Kingdom participated alongside other EU member states after an extension of Article 50 to 31 October 2019; therefore, the allocation of seats between the member states and the total number of seats remained as it had been in 2014.

On 26 May 2019, the centre-left and centre-right parties suffered significant losses, while pro-EU centrist, liberal and environmentalist parties and anti-EU right-wing populist parties made substantial gains. The European People's Party led by Manfred Weber won the most seats in the European Parliament, making Weber the leading candidate to become the next President of the European Commission. Despite this, the European Council decided after the election to nominate Ursula von der Leyen as new Commission President.

== New law ==
On 7 June 2018, the Council agreed at ambassador level to change the EU electoral law and to reform old laws from the 1976 Electoral Act. The purpose of the reform is to increase participation in elections, raise understanding of their European character and prevent irregular voting while at the same time respecting the constitutional and electoral traditions of the member states. The reform forbids double voting and voting in third countries, thus improving the visibility of European political parties. To avoid double voting, contact authorities are established to exchange data on voters, a process that has to start at least six weeks before the elections.

The European Parliament gave its consent on 4 July 2018 and the Act was adopted by the Council on 13 July 2018. However, not all member states ratified the Act prior to the 2019 elections and therefore this election took place in line with the previous rules.

== Political groups and lead candidates ==
=== Spitzenkandidat system ===
The Spitzenkandidat process involves the nomination by European political parties of candidates for the role of Commission President, the party winning the most seats in the European Parliament receiving the first opportunity to attempt to form a majority to back their candidate (akin to how heads of government are elected in national parliamentary democracies). This process was first used in 2014 and was opposed by some in the European Council. The future of the process is uncertain, but the European Parliament has attempted to codify the process and the parties are almost certain to select the candidates again. On 23 January 2018, the Constitutional Affairs Committee adopted a text stating that the Spitzenkandidat process could not be overturned, and that Parliament "will be ready to reject any candidate in the investiture procedure of the Commission President who was not appointed as a Spitzenkandidat in the run-up to the European elections". In May 2018, a Eurobarometer poll suggested that 49% of the 27,601 individuals from all 28 EU countries surveyed think that the Spitzenkandidat process will help them vote in the next European elections while 70% also think that the process requires a real debate on European issues.

=== Overview ===
European political parties		EP Group	Lead candidate(s)
EPP	European People's Party	EPP Group	Manfred Weber
PES	Party of European Socialists	S&D	Frans Timmermans
ACRE	Alliance of Conservatives and Reformists in Europe	ECR	Jan Zahradil
ECPM	European Christian Political Movement	ECR	None
ALDE	Alliance of Liberals and Democrats for Europe Party	ALDE Group	Team Europe
EDP	European Democratic Party	ALDE Group	None
EGP	European Green Party	Greens/EFA	Bas Eickhout, Ska Keller
EFA	European Free Alliance	Greens/EFA, ECR	Oriol Junqueras
PEL	Party of the European Left	GUE/NGL	Violeta Tomič, Nico Cué
MENF	Movement for a Europe of Nations and Freedom	ENF	None

=== European People's Party ===
Incumbent Jean-Claude Juncker stated he would not seek a second term as President of the European Commission.

Two candidates sought the nomination of the EPP:

- Alexander Stubb, the Vice-President of the European Investment Bank, former Prime Minister, Foreign Minister and Finance Minister of Finland.
- Manfred Weber, current group leader for the European People's Party in the European Parliament and member of the Christian Social Union in Bavaria has been backed by Angela Merkel as Spitzenkandidat for the party

At their 2018 Congress in Helsinki, the EPP elected Manfred Weber as their Spitzenkandidat for President of the European Commission.

=== Party of European Socialists ===
Previous candidate Martin Schulz left the European Parliament in 2017 to head the Social Democratic Party of Germany, but he stepped down from the latter position in 2018.

Two candidates were nominated by PES member parties and organisations:

- Maroš Šefčovič (Vice-President of the Commission) announced in September his bid to head the Commission.
- Frans Timmermans (first Vice-President of the Commission, previous Dutch Foreign Affairs Minister) announced in October his bid to head Commission.

Šefčovič announced his withdrawal in November and supported Frans Timmermans as the Common Candidate.

The party convened an extraordinary Congress in Lisbon to ratify the election of the candidate and to vote upon the manifesto.

=== European Conservatives and Reformists ===
Jan Zahradil, an MEP for the Czech Civic Democratic Party, is the Spitzenkandidat of the European Conservatives and Reformists.

=== Alliance of Liberals and Democrats for Europe Party ===
Rather than present a single candidate, the ALDE group presented a Team Europe of seven people as the alliance's leading candidates:

- Guy Verhofstadt (President of the ALDE group, MEP and former Prime Minister of Belgium)
- Nicola Beer (General Secretary and lead candidate of the Free Democratic Party in Germany)
- Margrethe Vestager (Commissioner for Competition, previous Danish Minister for Economy and Interior).
- Luis Garicano (chief economist for Ciudadanos in Spain)
- Emma Bonino (Former European Commissioner for Health and Consumer Protection, former Italian Minister of Foreign Affairs)
- Violeta Bulc (Commissioner for Transport, former Deputy Prime Minister of Slovenia)
- Katalin Cseh (founder of Hungary's Momentum Movement)

=== European Green Party ===
As in 2014, the Greens adopted the principle of having two leading candidates for the European Elections 2019. Unlike in 2014, where the candidates were chosen through an open online primary elections, the two leading candidates were elected by the Council of the Party in Berlin in November 2018. Four people, two of them being currently MEPs, have declared their candidacy:

- Petra De Sutter (Senator and member of the Parliamentary Assembly of the Council of Europe and candidate of Groen in the 2019 elections)
- Ska Keller (MEP and candidate of Alliance 90/The Greens in the 2019 elections).
- Bas Eickhout (MEP and candidate of GroenLinks in the 2019 elections)
- Atanas Schmidt (nominated by Zelena Partija, Bulgaria)

At their 2018 Congress in Berlin, the party elected Ska Keller and Bas Eickhout as their Spitzenkandidaten for the President of the European Commission.

=== European Free Alliance ===
Oriol Junqueras, a Catalan historian, academic and former Vice President of Catalonia who, at the time of the election, was imprisoned because of his involvement in the 2017 Catalan independence referendum, was the Spitzenkandidat of the European Free Alliance.

=== Party of the European Left ===
The designated candidates are Violeta Tomič from Slovenia and Belgian trade-unionist Nico Cué.

=== Populist and Eurosceptic groups ===
The Europe of Freedom and Direct Democracy was widely expected to disband after the election. One reason was that its biggest share of MEPs came from the United Kingdom, which was long expected to leave the EU before the election. The second was that the second-biggest partner, Italy's Five Star Movement (M5S), felt uneasy about this alliance anyway, having unsuccessfully tried to join the Greens/EFA or ALDE group instead. In February 2019, M5S alongside partners from Croatia, Finland, Greece and Poland presented a new alliance of anti-establishment parties that claim to be neither left nor right.

In the 5-month period preceding the 2019 European Parliament elections, the blog byoblu.com, which collaborated with the Five Star Movement (M5S), published deceptive information on Twitter, spreading disinformation during the 2019 European elections. The blog byoblu.com is owned by Claudio Messora, who was the head of communications for the 5 Star Movement and a close associate and friend of Beppe Grillo.

The Movement is an alliance of populist parties set up by Steve Bannon in 2018 with the purpose of contesting the European elections. Participating parties included, at least temporarily, Lega Nord, People's Party of Belgium and Brothers of Italy and possibly French National Rally. Originally envisioned as an attempt to unite the populist parties in Europe, The Movement has so far been snubbed by the Alternative for Germany, the Freedom Party of Austria and the UK Independence Party. In March 2019, reporters assessed Bannon's project as a failure. Shortly ahead of the election, Marine Le Pen of the French National Rally distanced herself from Bannon, clarifying that he played no role in her party's campaign.

In April 2019, Matteo Salvini of Italy's Lega launched the European Alliance of Peoples and Nations as a new coalition of populist, hard Eurosceptic and anti-immigration parties. It has been joined by most of the members of the outgoing Europe of Nations and Freedom group (including Lega, the French National Rally, Freedom Party of Austria and the Dutch Party for Freedom) as well as some former EFDD (Alternative for Germany) and ECR parties (Danish People's Party and Finns Party). It has been predicted to become the fourth largest group in parliament with an estimate of more than 80 MEPs.

=== New parties ===
2019 saw the debut of new parties such as Wiosna of Poland, Czech Pirate Party of Czech Republic, USR-PLUS of Romania, Human Shield and Most of Croatia, ĽSNS and Progressive Slovakia of Slovakia. Some of the new parties have already joined European parties, e.g. LMŠ of Slovenia is a member of ALDE.

The new Brexit Party won 29 seats in the United Kingdom. As such, it won the most seats by any national political party in the parliament; the German CDU/CSU also won 29 seats but as an alliance.

The biggest new party after UK exit is La République En Marche! (LREM) of French President Emmanuel Macron that was formed in 2016 and won the French presidential and parliamentary elections of the following year. Initially, it balked at joining any of the existing party families, instead trying to form a new parliamentary group of pro-European centrists who support Macron's plans to reform the European institutions, drawing away members from ALDE, EPP, and S&D. Possible partners for such a project were expected to include Spanish Ciudadanos, Progressive Slovakia, and the Hungarian Momentum Movement. However, the hypothetical group was considered to have difficulties to find MEPs from at least seven member states as is required to form a new group. In November 2018, LREM decided to cooperate with the liberal ALDE Group instead. Nevertheless, Macron stressed that this was merely a loose alliance and his party is not a member of ALDE Party. He bluntly criticised ALDE for accepting donations from the Bayer-Monsanto chemical group while LREM's campaign chief threatened to recall the alliance. In April and May 2019, LREM continued its efforts to build a broader group, including ALDE, but also centrist and centre-left parties outside of ALDE.

The European Spring initiated from the Democracy in Europe Movement 2025 ran as a European political alliance with one unified vision for Europe, the European Green New Deal. The most prominent figure is the former Greek minister Yanis Varoufakis, who ran as a candidate in the constituency of Germany, but failed to secure a seat. Despite garnering approximately one and a half million votes, no representatives who ran DiEM25 were elected, due to the votes being dispersed throughout different EU countries.

As a new European political alliance, Volt Europa was founded in different European countries two years before the elections and successfully campaigned in eight EU countries for the elections with one transnational programme. Despite missing its own goal to create a parliamentary group on its own, approximately half a million votes in total were sufficient to send one of the founders, Damian Boeselager, into the European Parliament via a German Volt list. Since June 2019, Volt is part of the group of the Greens/EFA.

== Televised debates ==
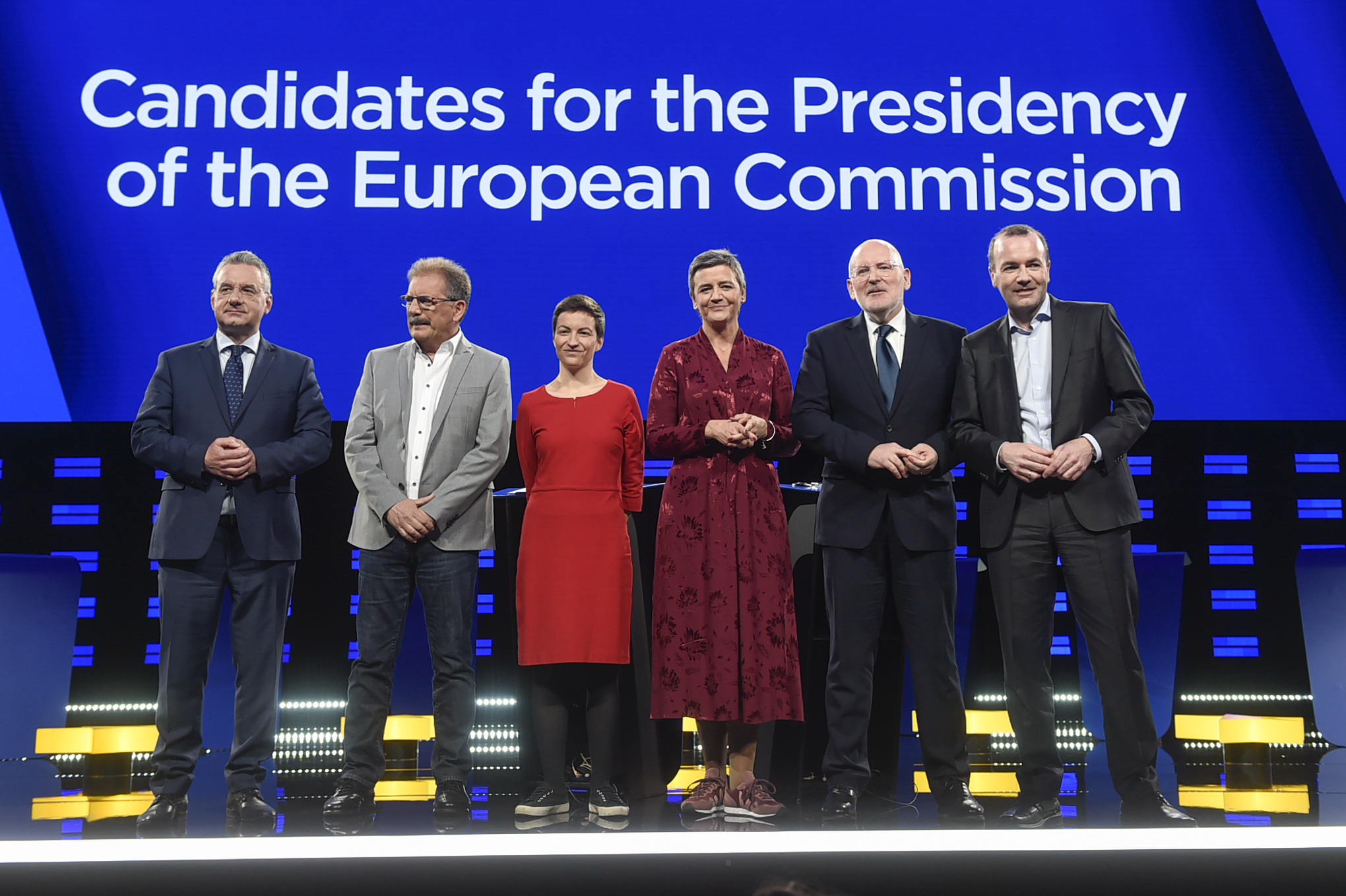
European Commission presidency candidates at Eurovision Debate (May 2019). Left to right: Zahradil, Cué, Keller, Vestager, Timmermans, Weber

Table of televised debates
Date	Time (CEST)	Institute	Participants	Location	Language	Main presenter(s)
17 April 2019	21:00	France 24 and RFI	Timmermans and Weber	Strasbourg	French	Caroline de Camaret (France 24) and Dominique Baillard (RFI)
17 April 2019	22:00	France 24	Timmermans and Weber	Strasbourg	English	Catherine Nicholson (France 24)
29 April 2019	19:00	Politico Europe	Eickhout, Timmermans, Tomić, Verhofstadt and Zahradil	Maastricht	English	Ryan Heath (Politico Europe) and Rianne Letschert (Maastricht University)
2 May 2019	18:00	Financial Times	Keller, Timmermans, Verhofstadt and Weber	Florence	English	Martin Sandbu (Financial Times)
7 May 2019	20:15	ARD	Timmermans and Weber	Cologne	German	Ellen Ehni and Andreas Cichowicz (both ARD)
15 May 2019	21:00	EBU	Cué, Keller, Timmermans, Vestager, Weber, and Zahradil	Brussels	English	Émilie Tran Nguyen (France Television), Markus Preiss (ARD Germany), and Annastiina Heikkilä (YLE Finland)
16 May 2019	20:15	ZDF and ORF	Timmermans and Weber	Berlin	German	Peter Frey (ZDF) and Ingrid Thurnher (ORF)
21 May 2019	22:00	NOS and NTR	Timmermans and Weber	Hilversum	German and Dutch	Jeroen Wollaars (NOS)

== Results ==
=== Groups ===
Map of Europe showing the European parliamentary group leading in each constituency. In constituencies where some groups have had the same number of seats, the groups with the most seats are displayed with hashing. EPP S&D RE G/EFA ID ECR GUE/NGL NI

Results by political group
Group (2019–24)		Votes		Seats		
Group (2019–24)		Votes	%	Seats	∆	%
EPP	European People's Party group	41,211,023 (Note: 5,249,935 votes for European Coalition (Poland), which comprised parties which joined the EPP and S&D groups, have been counted for the EPP group.; 375,660 votes for Christian Union – Reformed Political Party (Netherlands), which comprised parties which joined the EPP and ECR groups, have been counted for the EPP group.)	20.80	182 / 751	▼ −34	24.23
S&D	Progressive Alliance of Socialists and Democrats	35,421,084	17.88	154 / 751	▼ −31	20.51
RE	Renew Europe (Note: Renew Europe replaced the Alliance of Liberals and Democrats for Europe group (ALDE) from the 2014−2019 Parliament.)	23,788,652 (Note: 198,255 votes for PS–SPOLU (Slovakia), which comprised parties which joined the RE and EPP groups, have been counted for the RE group.)	12.01	108 / 751	▲ +39	14.38
G/EFA	Greens–European Free Alliance	19,886,513 (Note: 1,252,139 votes for Ahora Repúblicas (Spain), which comprised parties which joined the G/EFA and GUE/NGL groups (plus one non-inscrit), have been counted for the G/EFA group.)	10.04	74 / 751	▲ +22	9.85
ID	Identity and Democracy (Note: Identity and Democracy largely replaced the Europe of Nations and Freedom (ENF) group from the 2014−2019 Parliament.)	20,980,853	10.59	73 / 751	▲ +37	9.72
ECR	European Conservatives and Reformists	14,207,477	7.17	62 / 751	▼ −15	8.26
GUE/NGL	European United Left–Nordic Green Left	10,219,537 (Note: 2,258,857 votes for Unidas Podemos Cambiar Europa (Spain), which comprised parties which joined the GUE/NGL and G/EFA groups, have been counted for the GUE/NGL group.)	5.16	41 / 751	▼ −11	5.46
NI	Non-Inscrits	12,923,417	6.52	57 / 751	▲ +37	7.59
All others		19,453,922	9.82	0 / 751	N/A	0.00
Total		198,352,638	100.00	751	Steady	100.00
Vote totals given account only for lists which won seats and joined the corresponding group or sat as non-inscrits.

Votes summary
EPP	20.80%
S&D	17.88%
RE	12.01%
ID	10.59%
G/EFA	10.04%
ECR	7.17%
GUE/NGL	5.16%
NI	6.52%
Other	9.82%

Seats summary
EPP	24.23%
S&D	20.51%
RE	14.38%
G/EFA	9.85%
ID	9.72%
ECR	8.26%
GUE/NGL	5.46%
NI	7.59%

Gallagher Index for the 2019 European Parliament election
Party	Votes (%)	Seats (%)	Difference	Difference squared
EPP	20.80%	24.23%	3.43	11.7649
S&D	17.88%	20.51%	2.63	6.9169
RE	12.01%	14.38%	2.37	5.6169
G/EFA	10.04%	9.85%	-0.19	0.0361
ID	10.59%	9.72%	-0.87	0.7569
ECR	7.17%	8.26%	1.09	1.1881
GUE/NGL	5.16%	5.46%	0.3	0.09
NI	6.52%	7.59%	1.07	1.1449
Wasted vote	9.82%	0.00%	-9.82	96.4324
Total of differences squared				123.9471
Total / 2				61.9736
Square root of (Total / 2): Gallagher Index result				7.87
^{The Gallagher Index ranges from 0 to 100. Low indexes (close to 0) are very proportionate, high indexes (20 or greater) are very disproportionate.}

=== By country ===
State	Political groups																MEPs
State	EPP (EPP, ECPM)		S&D (PES, EDP)		RE (ALDE, EDP)		G/EFA (EGP, EFA)		ID (IDP)		ECR (ECRP, ECPM, EFA)		GUE/NGL (PEL)		NI		MEPs
Austria	7 (ÖVP)	+2	5 (SPÖ)	=	1 (NEOS)	=	2 (Grüne)	−1	3 (FPÖ)	−1							18
Belgium	2 (CD&V); 1 (CDH); 1 (CSP)	= = =	2 (PS); 1 (SP.A)	−1 =	2 (Open VLD); 2 (MR)	−1 −1	2 (ECOLO); 1 (Groen)	+1 =	3 (VB)	+2	3 (N-VA)	−1	1 (PTB)	+1			21
Bulgaria	5+1 (GERB+SDS); 1 (DSB)	= =	5 (BSP)	+1	3 (DPS)	−1					2 (VMRO)	+1					17
Croatia	4 (HDZ)	−1	3 (SDP)	+1	1 (AMS: IDS)	−1					1 (HKS)	=			1 (Human Shield); 1 (Kolakušić)	+1 +1	11
Cyprus	2 (DISY)	=	1 (EDEK); 1 (DIKO)	= =									2 (AKEL)	=			6
(Czech Republic); Czech; Republic	2+1 (TOP 09+STAN); 2 (KDU–ČSL)	−1 −1			6 (ANO)	+2	3 (Piráti)	+3	2 (SPD)	+2	4 (ODS)	+2	1 (KSČM)	−2			21
Denmark	1 (C)	=	3 (S)	=	3 (V); 2 (B)	+1 +1	2 (SF)	+1	1 (O)	−3			1 (RG)	+1			13
Estonia			2 (SDE)	+1	2 (RE); 1 (KE)	= =			1 (EKRE)	+1							6
Finland	3 (Kok.)	=	2 (SDP)	=	2 (Kesk.); 1 (SFP)	−1 =	2 (VIHR)	+1	2 (PS)	=			1 (Vas.)	=			13
France	8 (LR-LC)	−12	5 (PS-PP-ND)	−8	21 (LREM-MoDem-Agir–MR)	+21	12 (EELV)	+6	22 (RN)	−2			6 (FI)	+6			74
Germany	23 (CDU); 6 (CSU)	−5 +1	16 (SPD)	−11	5 (FDP); 2 (FW)	+2 +1	21 (B’90/Grüne); 1 (ÖDP); 1 (Piraten); 1 (Volt Europa); 1 (PARTEI)	+10 = = +1 +1	11 (AfD)	+4	1 (Familie)	=	5 (Linke); 1 (Tierschutz)	−2 =	1 (PARTEI)	=	96
Greece	8 (ND)	+3	2 (KINAL)	=							1 (EL)	+1	6 (SYRIZA)	=	2 (KKE); 2 (XA)	= −1	21
Hungary	12+1 (Fidesz+KDNP)	+1	1 (MSZP); 4 (DK)	−1 +2	2 (MoMo)	+2									1 (Jobbik)	−2	21
(Republic of Ireland); Ireland	4 (FG)	=			1 (FF)	=	2 (GP)	+2					2 (I4C); 1 (SF); 1 (Flanagan)	+2 −2 =			11
Italy	6 (FI); 1 (SVP)	−7 =	19 (PD)	−12					28 (Lega)	+23	5 (FdI)	+5			14 (M5S)	−3	73
Latvia	2 (JV)	−2	2 (Saskaņa)	+1	1 (AP!)	+1	1 (LKS)	=			2 (NA)	+1					8
Lithuania	3 (TS–LKD); 1 (Maldeikienė)	+1 +1	2 (LSDP)	=	1 (DP); 1 (LRLS)	= −1	2 (LVŽS)	+1			1 (LLRA)	=					11
Luxembourg	2 (CSV)	−1	1 (LSAP)	=	2 (DP)	+1	1 (Gréng)	=									6
Malta	2 (PN)	−1	4 (PL)	+1													6
Netherlands	4 (CDA); 1 (50+); 1 (CU)	−1 +1 +1	6 (PvdA)	+3	2 (D66); 4 (VVD)	−2 +1	3 (GL)	+1			3 (FvD); 1 (SGP)	+3 =	1 (PvdD)	=			26
Poland	14+3 (KE: KO+PSL)	6	5 (KE: SLD); 3 (Wiosna)	= +3							26 (PiS-SP)	+8					51
Portugal	6 (PSD); 1 (CDS–PP)	= =	9 (PS)	+1			1 (PAN)	+1					2 (CDU: PCP); 2 (BE)	−1 +1			21
Romania	10 (PNL); 2 (UDMR); 2 (PMP)	−1 = =	8 (PSD); 2 (PRO)	−8 +2	8 (USR-PLUS)	+8											32
Slovakia	2 (PS+SPOLU): (SPOLU); 1 (KDH); 1 (OĽaNO)	+2 −1 =	3 (Smer–SD)	−1	2 (PS+SPOLU): (PS)	+2					2 (SaS)	+1			2 (ĽSNS)	+2	13
Slovenia	2+1 (SDS+SLS); 1 (NSi)	−1 =	2 (SD)	+1	2 (LMS)	+2											8
Spain	12 (PP)	−4	20 (PSOE)	+6	7 (Cs); 1 (CEUS: EAJ/PNV)	+1 =	1 (AR: ERC); 1 (UP: CatComú)	-1 =			3 (VOX)	+3	3+2 (UP: Podemos+IU); 1 (AR: EH Bildu)	−5 =	2 (JuntsxCat); 1 (AR: ERC)	+2 +1	54
Sweden	4 (M); 2 (KD)	+1 +1	5 (S)	=	2 (C); 1 (L)	+1 −1	2 (MP)	−2			3 (SD)	+1	1 (V)	=			20
(United Kingdom); United; Kingdom			10 (LAB)	−10	16 (LD); 1 (Alliance)	+15 +1	7 (GPEW); 3 (SNP); 1 (PC)	+4 +1 =			4 (CON)	−15	1 (SF)	=	29 (Brexit Party); 1 (DUP)	+29 =	73
Total																	MEPs
Total	EPP		S&D		RE		G/EFA		ID		ECR		GUE/NGL		NI		MEPs
Total	182 (24.2%)	−39	154 (20.5%)	−37	108 (14.4%)	+41	74 (9.9%)	+24	73 (9.7%)	+26	62 (8.3%)	−8	41 (5.5%)	−11	57 (7.6%)	+5	751

== Post-Brexit seats ==
Map of the European Union with redistributed seats: GUE/NGL: 40 seats S&D: 148 seats G/EFA: 67 seats Renew: 97 seats EPP: 187 seats ECR: 62 seats ID: 76 seats Non-Inscrits: 28 seats

In June 2018, the European Council decided to reapportion 27 of the 73 seats which would become vacant in the event of the United Kingdom leaving the EU. As the United Kingdom was still a member of the EU at the time of the election, the elections were held with the same allocation of seats as in 2014. When the United Kingdom left the EU, 27 of the seats were reallocated to other EU member states as shown below, resulting in a total of 705 MEPs.

State	Seats before	Seats after	Change
Austria	18	19	▲1
Belgium	21	21	0
Bulgaria	17	17	0
Croatia	11	12	▲1
Cyprus	6	6	0
Czech Republic	21	21	0
Denmark	13	14	▲1
Estonia	6	7	▲1
Finland	13	14	▲1
France	74	79	▲5
Germany	96	96	0
Greece	21	21	0
Hungary	21	21	0
Ireland	11	13	▲2
Italy	73	76	▲3
Latvia	8	8	0
Lithuania	11	11	0
Luxembourg	6	6	0
Malta	6	6	0
Netherlands	26	29	▲3
Poland	51	52	▲1
Portugal	21	21	0
Romania	32	33	▲1
Slovakia	13	14	▲1
Slovenia	8	8	0
Spain	54	59	▲5
Sweden	20	21	▲1
United Kingdom	73	0	▼73
Total	751	705	▼46

=== Changes in group representation ===
The table below shows the changes in group composition after the United Kingdom left the EU.

Member state	Political groups								MEPs
Member state	EPP	S&D	RE	G/EFA	ID	ECR	GUE/NGL	NI	MEPs
Austria				+1 (Grüne)					+1
Croatia		+1 (SDP)							+1
Denmark			+1 (V)						+1
Estonia	+1 (PP)								+1
Finland				+1 (VIHR)					+1
France		+1 (PS)	+1 (LREM) +1 (IV)	+1 (EELV)	+1 (RN)				+5
(Republic of Ireland) Ireland	+1 (FG)		+1 (FF)						+2
Italy	+1 (FI)				+1 (LN)	+1 (FdI)			+3
Netherlands			+1 (VVD)		+1 (PVV) (Note: Geert Wilders, leader of the PVV, announced that the party would join the ID group.)	+1 (FvD)			+3
Poland						+1 (PiS)			+1
Romania		+1 (PSD)							+1
Slovakia	+1 (KDH)								+1
Spain	+1 (PP)	+1 (PSOE)	+1 (Cs)			+1 (VOX)		+1 (JuntsxCat)	+5
Sweden				+1 (MP)					+1
(United Kingdom) United; Kingdom		−10 (Lab)	−16 (LibDem) −1 (APNI)	−7 (Green) −3 (SNP) −1 (PC)		−4 (Con)	−1 (SF)	−29 (Brexit Party) −1 (DUP)	−73
Change	+5	−6	−11	−7	+3	0	−1	−29	−46

== Seat projections ==
There were no pan-European polls for the European elections. However, several organisations calculated the theoretical seat distribution in the European Parliament based on national polls in all member states. The table below displays these different projections. Since the United Kingdom notified its intention to leave the European Union in March 2017, the United Kingdom was expected not to participate in the European elections and was therefore excluded from projections. On 10 April 2019, the European Council extended the Brexit deadline to 31 October 2019, and the UK did participate in the European elections. The UK was included in most projections after that date.

Opinion polls by number of seats
Institute	Date	EPP	S&D	RE	Greens/EFA	ID	ECR	GUE/NGL	EFDD	NI	Far-right (NI)	Far-left (NI)	Moderate (NI)
Election result	2019-05-26	182	154	108	74	73	62	41	44 (Note: If the group had been able to be formed)	13 →	7	2	4
Europe Elects (with United Kingdom)	2019-05-21	172	151	110	59 (incl. 5 Pirates)	82 (as EAPN)	60	52	52 (28 from Brexit)	13	–	–	
election.de (with United Kingdom)	2019-05-20	169 (no Fidesz)	155	99	57	84 (as EAPN)	82 (15 from Fidesz)	53	41 (as 5SDD with Brexit)	11	–	–	–
Europe Elects (with United Kingdom)	2019-05-14	178	153	104	55	82 (as EAPN)	61	51	48	13+5	–	–	–
EU19.EU (with United Kingdom)	2019-05-08	157	174	99	49	85	75	46	29	37	–	–	–
Europe Elects (with United Kingdom)	2019-05-07	180	158	101	51	84 (as EAPN)	61	50	45	12+9	–	–	–
election.de (with United Kingdom)	2019-05-05	175 (no Fidesz)	147	99	63	79 (as EAPN)	81 (13 from Fidesz)	53	22 (as 5SDD)	32	–	–	–
EuropeanElectionsStats.eu (without United Kingdom)	2019-05-01	178	125	74 (no En Marche)	50	57	49	50	36	→	30	4	52 (24 from En Marche)
Europe Elects (with United Kingdom)	2019-04-30	180	159	102	51	82 (as EAPN)	61	49	–	12+55	–	–	–
Europe Elects (with United Kingdom)	2019-04-25	180	161	104	51	85 (as EAPN)	64	49	–	13+44	–	–	–
EU19.EU (without United Kingdom)	2019-04-23	181	145	107	49	75	58	45	25	20	–	–	–
EuropeanElectionsStats.eu (with United Kingdom)	2019-04-16	177	148	73 (no En Marche)	57	63	58	48	40	→	35	3	49 (22 from En Marche)
EuropeanElectionsStats.eu (without United Kingdom)	2019-04-16	185	132	67 (no En Marche)	50	57	47	51	27	→	39	3	47 (22 from En Marche)
Bidimedia (with United Kingdom)	2019-04-12	175	158	96	49	63	74	47	32	7+50	–	–	–
EU19.EU (with United Kingdom)	2019-04-12	176	171	98	49	74	76	46	27	34	–	–	–
Europe Elects	2019-04-10	184	135	106	47	63	63	51	35	11+10	–	–	–
Europe Elects	2019-04-10	184	135	106	47	84 (as EAPN)	63	51	24	11+10	–	–	–
EU19.EU	2019-04-05	193	140	99	48	75	60	48	19 (only M5S)	23	–	–	–
European Parliament	2019-03-29	188	142	72 (no En Marche)	51	61	43	49	30	37	–	–	22 (only En Marche)
EU19.EU	2019-03-29	187	145	99	47	74	61	50	22 (only M5S)	20	–	–	–
EU19.EU	2019-03-27	184	146	102	45	78	59	49	22 (only M5S)	20	–	–	–
Europe Elects	2019-03-25	177	135	105	46	62	64	53	40	12+11	–	–	–
EU19.EU	2019-03-21	180	135	102	50	81	67	48	23 (only M5S)	19	–	–	–
EU19.EU	2019-03-18	181	135	101	50	82	65	48	24 (only M5S)	19	–	–	–
EuropeanElectionsStats.eu	2019-03-15	183	134	73 (no En Marche)	46	60	40	49	32	→	38	3	47 (21 from En Marche)
election.de	2019-03-15	175 (no Fidesz)	132	98	57	62	59	53	61 (12 from Fidesz)	8	–	–	–
EU19.EU	2019-03-14	178	143	101	47	83	58	51	24 (only M5S)	20	–	–	–
EU19.EU	2019-03-06	186	142	94	48	81	60	49	25 (only M5S)	20	–	–	–
EU19.EU	2019-03-04	185	141	94	47	83	59	52	25 (only M5S)	19	–	–	–
EU19.EU	2019-03-01	182	138	97	47	83	59	53	26 (only M5S)	20	–	–	–
European Parliament	2019-02	181	135	75	49	59	46	47	39	74	–	–	–
EU19.EU	2019-02-26	173	144	99	50	82	59	51	26 (only M5S)	21	–	–	–
EuropeanElectionsStats.eu	2019-02-24	185	139	68 (no En Marche)	43	59	46	50	34	→	40	3	38 (21 from En Marche)
EU19.EU	2019-02-21	170	141	104	48	84	62	50	23 (only M5S)	23	–	–	–
EU19.EU	2019-02-20	168	143	106	48	83	63	49	24 (only M5S)	23	–	–	–
Eurobarometer	2019-02-18	183	135	75 (no En Marche)	45	59	51	46	43	22+58	–	–	–
EU19.EU	2019-02-16	167	143	104	47	85	63	47	25 (only M5S)	24	–	–	–
EuropeanElectionsStats.eu	2019-02-03	191	138	68 (no En Marche)	45	56	56	52	35	→	39	3	36 (21 from En Marche)
European Parliament	2019-01	186	129	77	46	60	43	45	34	85	–	–	–
Europe Elects ("United Right Scenario")	2019-01-30	191	129	98	47	132	–	56	–	12+40	–	–	–
Europe Elects ("EFDD breaks apart scenario")	2019-01-30	177	129	98	47	77	93	56	–	12+16	–	–	–
Europe Elects	2019-01-13	177	129	98	47	62	62	56	46	12+16	–	–	–
Der (europäische) Föderalist	2019-01-08	181	130	90	49	63	58	57	14	11+52	–	–	–
European Parliament	2018-12	185	131	78	42	62	45	49	46	67	–	–	–
Europe Elects	2018-12-05	178	133	96	43	61	53	58	47	13+21	–	–	–
European Parliament	2018-11	181	140	78	46	59	43	50	45	63	–	–	–
EuropeanElectionsStats.eu	2018-11-29	186	140	76 (no En Marche)	42	56	43	56	35	→	36	3	32 (18 from En Marche)
Europe Elects	2018-11-11	172	136	98	45	61	54	60	48	10+21	–	–	–
EuropeanElectionsStats.eu	2018-10-28	186	136	77 (no En Marche)	40	53	42	58	38	→	38	3	34 (21 from En Marche)
Instituto Cattaneo	2018-10-09	180	139	93	45	63	54	63	55	13	–	–	–
Europe Elects	2018-10-09	177	134	98	40	61	50	61	50	9+25	–	–	–
Politico Europe	2018-10-08	178	137	83 (21 En Marche)	40	59	48	58	53	6+33	–	–	–
EuropeanElectionsStats.eu	2018-09-22	182	139	76 (no En Marche)	36	52	46	61	40	→	36	3	33 (21 from En Marche)
Europe Elects	2018-09-20	181	134	100	37	57	49	61	49	11+26	–	–	–
Der (europäische) Föderalist	2018-09-19	178	140	95	42	59	50	60	21	10+50	–	–	–
EuropeanElectionsStats.eu	2018-09-12	187	141	72 (no En Marche)	33	52	44	60	39	→	39	4	33 (21 from En Marche)
Europe Elects	2018-08-10	179	137	104	36	55	50	60	49	10+25	–	–	–
Thomson Reuters	2018-07-28	180	154	104	34	63	42	56	59	13	–	–	–
Der (europäische) Föderalist ("dynamic scenario")	2018-07-25	177	145	56 (En Marche); 53 (ALDE)	38	78	90	58	–	10	–	–	–
Der (europäische) Föderalist ("baseline scenario")	2018-07-25	177	145	102	38	56	50	57	22	10+48	–	–	–
www.thenewfederalist.eu/Europe Elects	2018-07-06	185	141	110	34	52	44	58	49	9+23	–	–	–
Der (europäische) Föderalist ("dynamic scenario")	2018-05-29	178	138	57 (En Marche); 50 (ALDE)	37	66	84	56	–	12	–	–	–
Der (europäische) Föderalist ("baseline scenario")	2018-05-29	178	137	103	37	46	43	55	23	12+44	–	–	–
treffpunkteuropa.de/Europe Elects	2018-05-18	179	141	112	32	47	42	61	58	12+21	–	–	–
treffpunkteuropa.de/Europe Elects	2018-04-17	180	143	112	33	46	42	60	58	9+22	–	–	–
Der (europäische) Föderalist	2018-04-03	180	137	104	33	44	41	58	23	12+46	–	–	–
Der (europäische) Föderalist	2018-02-05	179	142	102	33	41	47	65	42	27	–	–	–
Der (europäische) Föderalist	2017-12-13	196	142	109	30	36	45	56	37	27	–	–	–
Der (europäische) Föderalist	2017-10-16	192	150	106	28	37	45	55	38	27	–	–	–
Der (europäische) Föderalist	2017-08-21	196	149	108	24	44	42	57	29	29	–	–	–
Der (europäische) Föderalist	2017-06-27	201	155	109	23	42	38	55	28	27	–	–	–
Der (europäische) Föderalist	2017-05-02	198	170	82	28	59	35	46	27	33	–	–	–
New allocation of seats without the United Kingdom approved
Der (europäische) Föderalist	2017-05-02	198	186	88	35	59	68	47	36	34	–	–	–
Europe Elects/treffpunkteuropa.de	2017-03-28	181	181	75	29	48	74	58	40	51	–	–	–
Der (europäische) Föderalist	2017-03-06	191	182	80	35	60	69	50	48	36	–	–	–
Europe Elects/treffpunkteuropa.de	2017-03-01	174	185	85	31	51	81	54	42	48	–	–	–
Der (europäische) Föderalist	2017-01-16	191	180	82	40	68	63	48	48	31	–	–	–
Europe Elects/treffpunkteuropa.de	2017-01-07	189	170	82	28	60	71	63	38	49	–	–	–
Europe Elects/treffpunkteuropa.de	2016-12-01	195	176	81	35	57	72	57	38	42	–	–	–
Der (europäische) Föderalist	2016-11-14	194	182	91	38	61	65	48	47	25	–	–	–
Europe Elects/treffpunkteuropa.de	2016-10-31	191	171	75	30	61	73	71	41	38	–	–	–
Europe Elects/treffpunkteuropa.de	2016-10-01	194	179	82	31	64	71	57	42	31	–	–	–
Der (europäische) Föderalist	2016-09-13	189	181	91	38	63	62	47	53	27	–	–	–
Europe Elects/treffpunkteuropa.de	2016-09-01	189	176	86	32	54	74	59	40	32	–	–	–
Europe Elects/treffpunkteuropa.de	2016-08-13	191	184	86	32	58	72	60	40	21	–	–	–
Der (europäische) Föderalist	2016-07-28	192	185	90	39	61	59	48	54	13	–	–	–
Europe Elects/treffpunkteuropa.de	2016-07-13	202	187	92	31	58	67	57	36	21	–	–	–
Europe Elects/treffpunkteuropa.de	2016-06-23	183	179	88	32	61	74	61	46	27	–	–	–
Europe Elects/treffpunkteuropa.de	2016-06-01	186	177	83	35	45	76	59	63	27	–	–	–
Der (europäische) Föderalist	2016-05-25	187	174	85	40	70	63	55	51	12	–	–	–
Europe Elects/treffpunkteuropa.de	2016-05-02	187	178	89	27	49	69	66	56	23	–	–	–
Der (europäische) Föderalist	2016-04-07	192	179	85	37	53	72	52	50	31	–	–	–
Europe Elects/treffpunkteuropa.de	2016-04-02	205	177	87	30	48	84	58	37	25	–	–	–
Europe Elects/treffpunkteuropa.de	2016-03-01	186	183	99	27	48	81	65	37	25	–	–	–
Der (europäische) Föderalist	2016-02-07	196	183	82	34	55	70	51	51	29	–	–	–
Europe Elects/treffpunkteuropa.de	2016-02-02	191	186	79	27	51	86	69	39	23	–	–	–
Europe Elects/treffpunkteuropa.de	2016-01-04	194	187	95	28	48	76	66	37	20	–	–	–
Der (europäische) Föderalist	2015-12-14	192	185	87	33	53	68	52	52	29	–	–	–
Europe Elects/treffpunkteuropa.de	2015-12-02	197	186	82	33	47	91	61	37	17	–	–	–
thenewfederalist.eu	2015-11-17	196	201	76	31	42	88	62	42	13	–	–	–
Europe Elects/treffpunkteuropa.de	2015-11-01	197	203	75	31	42	88	61	42	12	–	–	–
Der (europäische) Föderalist	2015-10-17	204	193	75	33	54	66	51	51	24	–	–	–
Der (europäische) Föderalist	2015-08-21	204	190	74	35	49	70	56	47	26	–	–	–
Europe Elects/treffpunkteuropa.de	2015-07-03	206	193	68	36	39	80	69	30	30	–	–	–
Der (europäische) Föderalist	2015-06-30	205	188	73	34	47	69	61	43	31	–	–	–
Europe Elects/treffpunkteuropa.de	2015-05-05	218	196	75	31	–	71	74	34	52	–	–	–
Der (europäische) Föderalist	2015-05-03	205	193	80	32	(51)	62	60	44	24	–	–	–
Der (europäische) Föderalist	2015-03-10	216	196	77	31	(49)	60	60	43	19	–	–	–
Der (europäische) Föderalist	2015-01-12	212	190	70	40	(43)	59	65	47	25	–	–	–
Der (europäische) Föderalist	2014-11-18	212	195	69	42	(43)	59	60	47	24	–	–	–
Der (europäische) Föderalist	2014-09-23	223	196	67	39	(40)	61	53	47	25	–	–	–
Der (europäische) Föderalist	2014-07-28	215	191	75	47	(40)	66	56	44	17	–	–	–
European election 2014	2014-05-25	221	191	67	50	(37)	70	52	48	15	–	–	–

=== Percent ===
The following table shows projections with vote share instead of seats.

Opinion polls by vote share
Institute	Date	EPP	S&D	ECR	RE	Greens/EFA	GUE/NGL	EFDD	ENF	NI	Others
Result	2019-05-26	21.0%	18.5%	8.2%	13.0%	11.7%	6.5%	5.7%	10.8%	1.5%	3.1%
Europe Elects	2019-04-10	22.9%	18.0%	8.0%	13.1%	8.4%	7.3%	6.8%	8.4%	→	6.8%
Europe Elects	2018-12-27	21.4%	17.8%	5.9%	12.7%	7.0%	7.5%	8.2%	9.2%	→	9.3%
Europe Elects	2018-12-05	21.6%	17.9%	5.7%	13.1%	7.4%	8.3%	8.2%	8.6%	1.0%	8.3%
Europe Elects	2018-11-11	20.8%	17.6%	5.1%	13.3%	7.0%	8.8%	9.1%	9.6%	1.0%	7.8%
Europe Elects	2018-10-26	20.9%	18.4%	5.0%	11.6%	6.4%	8.6%	9.3%	9.1%	1.1%	9.7%
Europe Elects	2018-10-18	21.5%	18.4%	4.3%	12.0%	6.4%	8.7%	9.5%	9.3%	1.0%	8.9%
Europe Elects	2018-10-14	21.3%	18.3%	3.9%	12.6%	6.3%	8.6%	9.5%	9.3%	1.0%	9.1%
Europe Elects	2018-10-13	21.3%	18.4%	3.9%	12.5%	6.3%	8.6%	9.5%	9.3%	1.0%	9.1%
Europe Elects	2018-10-12	21.3%	18.5%	3.9%	12.5%	6.5%	8.6%	9.6%	9.3%	1.0%	9.1%
Europe Elects/treffpunkteuropa.de/Europe Elects	2018-06-01	20%	19.5%	9.5%	12.5%	6%	8%	8.5%	7.5%	2%	?
Europe Elects/treffpunkteuropa.de/Europe Elects	2018-05-01	20.5%	21%	10.5%	13%	4.5%	8%	8%	7%	2%	?
Europe Elects/treffpunkteuropa.de/Europe Elects	2018-04-01	20.5%	19.5%	10%	14%	4.5%	7.5%	8%	6.5%	1.5%	?
Europe Elects/treffpunkteuropa.de	2018-03-07	21%	20.5%	10%	12.5%	4.5%	7.5%	8.5%	6%	2.5%	?
Europe Elects/treffpunkteuropa.de	2018-01-30	21%	22%	10%	13.5%	5%	7.5%	7.5%	5.5%	2%	?
Europe Elects/treffpunkteuropa.de	2018-01-01	21%	22.5%	10%	12.5%	4.5%	8.5%	7.5%	5.5%	2%	?
Europe Elects/treffpunkteuropa.de	2017-11-30	21.5%	22%	10%	12.5%	4%	8%	7%	6.5%	2%	?
Europe Elects/treffpunkteuropa.de	2017-11-14	21.5%	21.5%	9.5%	13%	4%	8%	7%	6%	3%	6%
Europe Elects/treffpunkteuropa.de	2017-10-06	21%	23%	9.5%	12.5%	4.5%	8%	4.5%	7%	3%	?
Europe Elects/treffpunkteuropa.de	2017-09-14	22.5%	23%	9.5%	13%	4.5%	8%	4.5%	6%	3%	?
Europe Elects/treffpunkteuropa.de	2017-06-14	22.5%	24%	8%	12.5%	4%	8%	4%	5.5%	3%	?
Europe Elects/treffpunkteuropa.de	2017-05-22	22%	23%	8.5%	12%	4%	8%	4.5%	6.5%	3%	?
Europe Elects/treffpunkteuropa.de	2017-03-28	22%	23%	8.5%	8%	4%	7.5%	6%	7%	6.5%	7.5%
Europe Elects/treffpunkteuropa.de	2017-03-01	21%	23.5%	9%	8.5%	4%	7.5%	6.5%	7.5%	6%	6.5%
Europe Elects/treffpunkteuropa.de	2017-02-02	23%	20.5%	9.5%	8%	4.5%	8%	6%	8.5%	5.5%	6.5%
Europe Elects/treffpunkteuropa.de	2017-01-07	23.5%	22%	9%	8.5%	4.5%	7.5%	6.5%	9%	3.5%	6.5%
Europe Elects/treffpunkteuropa.de	2016-12-01	23.5%	22.5%	9%	8.5%	4.5%	7.5%	6.5%	8.5%	3.5%	6%
Europe Elects/treffpunkteuropa.de	2016-10-31	23%	21%	9%	8%	5%	8%	7%	9%	3%	7%
Europe Elects/treffpunkteuropa.de	2016-10-01	24%	22%	9%	9%	4%	8%	7%	9%	3%	5%
Europe Elects/treffpunkteuropa.de	2016-09-01	25%	24%	10%	12%	4%	8%	5%	8%	4%	–
Europe Elects/treffpunkteuropa.de	2016-08-13	26%	24%	10%	11%	4%	8%	5%	8%	4%	–
Europe Elects/treffpunkteuropa.de	2016-07-13	27%	25%	9%	12%	4%	7%	5%	8%	?	–
Europe Elects/treffpunkteuropa.de	2016-06-23	24%	24%	10%	12%	4%	8%	6%	8%	4%	–
Europe Elects/treffpunkteuropa.de	2016-06-01	25%	23%	10%	11%	5%	8%	6%	8%	4%	–
Europe Elects/treffpunkteuropa.de	2016-05-22	25%	24%	10%	11%	4%	8%	6%	8%	4%	–
Europe Elects/treffpunkteuropa.de	2016-05-02	25%	24%	9%	12%	4%	9%	7%	7%	?	–
Europe Elects/treffpunkteuropa.de	2016-04-02	27%	24%	11%	12%	4%	8%	5%	6%	?	–
Europe Elects/treffpunkteuropa.de	2016-03-01	25%	24%	11%	13%	4%	9%	5%	6%	?	–
Europe Elects/treffpunkteuropa.de	2016-02-02	25%	25%	11%	11%	4%	9%	5%	7%	3%	–
Europe Elects/treffpunkteuropa.de	2016-01-04	26%	25%	10%	13%	4%	9%	5%	6%	2%	–
Europe Elects/treffpunkteuropa.de	2015-12-02	26%	25%	12%	11%	5%	8%	5%	6%	2%	–
Europe Elects/thenewfederalist.eu	2015-11-17	26%	27%	12%	10%	4%	8%	5%	6%	2%	–
Europe Elects/treffpunkteuropa.de	2015-11-01	26%	27%	12%	10%	4%	8%	5%	6%	2%	–
Europe Elects/treffpunkteuropa.de	2015-10-01	26%	26%	10%	11%	4%	9%	5%	6%	3%	–
Europe Elects/treffpunkteuropa.de	2015-09-01	27%	26%	11%	10%	5%	9%	4%	5%	3%	–
Europe Elects/treffpunkteuropa.de	2015-08-06	27%	26%	10%	9%	5%	10%	4%	5%	3%	–
Europe Elects/treffpunkteuropa.de	2015-07-03	27%	26%	11%	9%	5%	9%	4%	5%	4%	–
Europe Elects/treffpunkteuropa.de	2015-06-16	27%	25%	10%	10.5%	5%	9%	4%	5.5%	4%	–
Europe Elects/treffpunkteuropa.de	2015-06-02	27%	26%	11%	9%	4%	9%	5%	–	9%	–
Europe Elects/treffpunkteuropa.de	2015-05-05	29%	26%	9%	10%	4%	10%	5%	–	7%	–
Europe Elects/treffpunkteuropa.de	2015-04-03	29%	27%	10%	9%	4%	9%	4%	–	8%	–
Europe Elects/treffpunkteuropa.de	2015-03-12	29%	27%	10%	9%	4%	10%	4%	–	7%	–
Europe Elects/treffpunkteuropa.de	2015-01-30	29%	27%	9%	10%	4%	9%	5%	–	7%	–
Europe Elects/treffpunkteuropa.de	2014-12-30	29%	27%	10%	9%	4%	10%	4%	–	7%	–
Europe Elects/treffpunkteuropa.de	2014-11-30	29%	27%	10%	10%	5%	9%	4%	–	6%	–
Europe Elects/treffpunkteuropa.de	2014-10-30	29%	26%	9%	10%	5%	9%	4%	–	8%	–
Europe Elects/treffpunkteuropa.de	2014-09-30	29%	26%	9%	10%	5%	9%	5%	–	7%	–
Europe Elects/treffpunkteuropa.de	2014-08-30	27%	28%	9%	10%	5%	9%	5%	–	7%	–
Europe Elects/treffpunkteuropa.de	2014-07-30	28%	26%	10%	10%	6%	8%	5%	–	7%	–
Europe Elects/treffpunkteuropa.de	2014-06-30	29%	26%	9%	10%	6%	8%	5%	–	7%	–
European election 2014	2014-05-25	29.2 %	25.4 %	9.1 %	8.9 %	6.8 %	6.7 %	6.4 %	–	7.1 %	–

== Aftermath ==
=== European Commission ===
The heads of governments, gathered in a European Council on 1–3 July 2019, could not agree on a consensus President of the Commission. The two Spitzenkandidaten were discussed, but neither Manfred Weber (EPP), nor Frans Timmermans (PES), who had the backing of many leaders but not of those from the Visegrád Group, had a majority. In the final hours of the vote, the name of Ursula von der Leyen was suggested and agreed to by all governments, with Germany's abstention.

The European Parliament elected Ursula von der Leyen as President of the European Commission on 16 July, with 383 votes in favour (374 votes needed).

The European Commission was approved by the European Parliament on 27 November 2019, receiving 461 votes, with 157 against and 89 abstentions. EPP, S&D, Renew Europe and half of the ECR voted in favour. The Greens/EFA abstained.

== See also ==
- List of European Parliament elections by state (includes 2019 elections)
