= Benjamin Bejbaum =

French entrepreneur (born 1976)

- Born: November 20, 1976 (age 48); Paris, France
- Occupation: Co-Founder & Former CEO of Dailymotion
- Website: www.dailymotion.com

Benjamin Bejbaum is a French entrepreneur and computer programmer, who is particularly known for being co-founder of Dailymotion video-sharing site with Olivier Poitrey. He was the CEO of the company. During that time, he was responsible for the strategy of the start-up.

== Life and education ==
Bejbaum was born into a Jewish immigrant family on November 20, 1976, in Paris. His father was from Poland and his mother from Tunisia. He attended Gérard de Nerval High School, Luzarches (Val-d'Oise). He then enrolled at the university in Villetaneuse (Seine-Saint-Denis) to study applied mathematics and information sciences.

== DailyMotion ==
In March 2005, Bejbaum founded Dailymotion, along with Olivier Poitrey. A year later, the video site got $9.5 million from Atlas Ventures and Partech International a year later. After hiring Zaleski from QXL as executive chairman, he got $34 million led by Adventure Partners and AGF Private Equity in August 2007.

In December 2008, Benjamin Bejbaum left the day-to-day operations at the company while Mark Zalesky took his position. After that, he continued on the board of the start-up.
