= French Association of Internet Community Services =

French Association of Internet Community Services (ASIC) is a coalition of more than 20 firms from the Web environment including eBay, Google, Wikipedia formed to be an opposition force against the French government data retention measures planning to keep web users’ personal data information such has full names and postal addresses for a year.

== Member History ==
3 December 2007 - Creation of the association the first French association promoting and protecting the “new internet” the initiator of this project are AOL, Google, Dailymotion, Priceminister, Yahoo

20 December 2007 - Exalead, Microsoft, SkyrocketZlio joined the group

15 January 2008 - Kewego, Over-blog et Wikimedia are part of this program

14 February 2008 - MySpace is welcomed to the group

6 January 2009 - Wikio platform joined ASIC

6 April 2009 - eBay

17 March 2010 - Facebook

6 May 2010 - AlloCiné

17, 24, 31 January 2011 - Spotify, Skype, Deezer

14 February 2011 - Yakaz

== Actions ==
The first decree related to the data retention explicitly, called LCEN (liberty of communication online), the 21st of June 2004. This decree was a start for the government to define the legal frame for Hosters and ISP. It precises the notion of “content creation” defined as “operations of initial creation, the modifications of contents and data linked with deletion of the content”.

A big change was made the 25th of February 2011, another decree much more ambitious was released precising now what types of data needs to be kept and how long.

Here is a table summarizing the decision regarding each web actors:

Types	ISP	WebHosters
What need to be kept and available for the authorities?	During each user connection: *Connection login *Password; *Terminal identifier (ip, mac address, platform ...); *Connection logs *Connection characteristics	During each content creation: *Communication origin and ID; *Object of the operation *Protocols used *Operation details *Date and hour of the operation *Author IDs
What need to be kept and available for the authorities?	During the subscription: *Connection IDs; *Last name, surname, corporate name *Addressesinformation's; *Login name *Mail information's *Phone number Passwords	
What need to be kept and available for the authorities?	During the payment: *Payment type *Payment references *Amount of the transaction *Hour and date	
How long information's need to be available for the government?	1 Year	

NB: For now no fine are plan yet for non respect of the law

ASIC head Benoit Tabaka believes that the data law is unnecessarily draconian. "Several elements are problematic," he said. "For instance, there was no consultation with the European Commission. Our companies are based in several European countries”.That the reason why ASIC takes the French government to court the 5th of April 2011. The main aim of the legal challenge is to see the law cancelled. Wait & See...
