= Five Star Direct Democracy =

European political alliance in 2019

- Abbreviation: 5SDD
- Founder: Luigi Di Maio
- Founded: 2019
- Split from: Europe of Freedom and Direct Democracy
- Political position: Syncretic

Five Star Direct Democracy was a European political alliance created ahead of the 2019 European Parliament election by the then deputy prime minister of Italy Luigi Di Maio, with the intent of forming a political group in the European Parliament. The alliance consisted of five political parties which shared a syncretic political ideology centered around direct democracy and anti-establishment rhetoric. The alliance won 15 seats from two countries (14 from Italy and 1 from Croatia), falling short of the 25 MEPs from seven member states required to form a political group in the European Parliament.

== Membership ==
The following parties participated in the alliance:

Country	Party	Abbr.	Representative	Ideology	Seats won
Croatia	Human Shield	ŽZ	Ivan Vilibor Sinčić	Populism	1 / 11
Finland	Movement Now	Liik	Karoliina Kähönen	Liberalism	0 / 13
Greece	Agricultural Livestock Party of Greece	AKKEL	Evangelos Tsiobanidis	Agrarianism	0 / 21
Italy	Five Star Movement	M5S	Luigi Di Maio	Populism	14 / 73
Poland	Kukiz'15	K'15	Paweł Kukiz	Right-wing populism	0 / 51

== See also ==
- Democracy in Europe Movement 2025, pan-European alliance aiming to democratise the EU
- Yellow vests protests, motivated by similar principles to 5SDD
- Law and Justice, successor to Human Shield
- European Alliance for Freedom and Democracy, of which ŽZ, AKKEL, and K'15 were membres
