= Maxime Saada =

French media executive (born 1970)

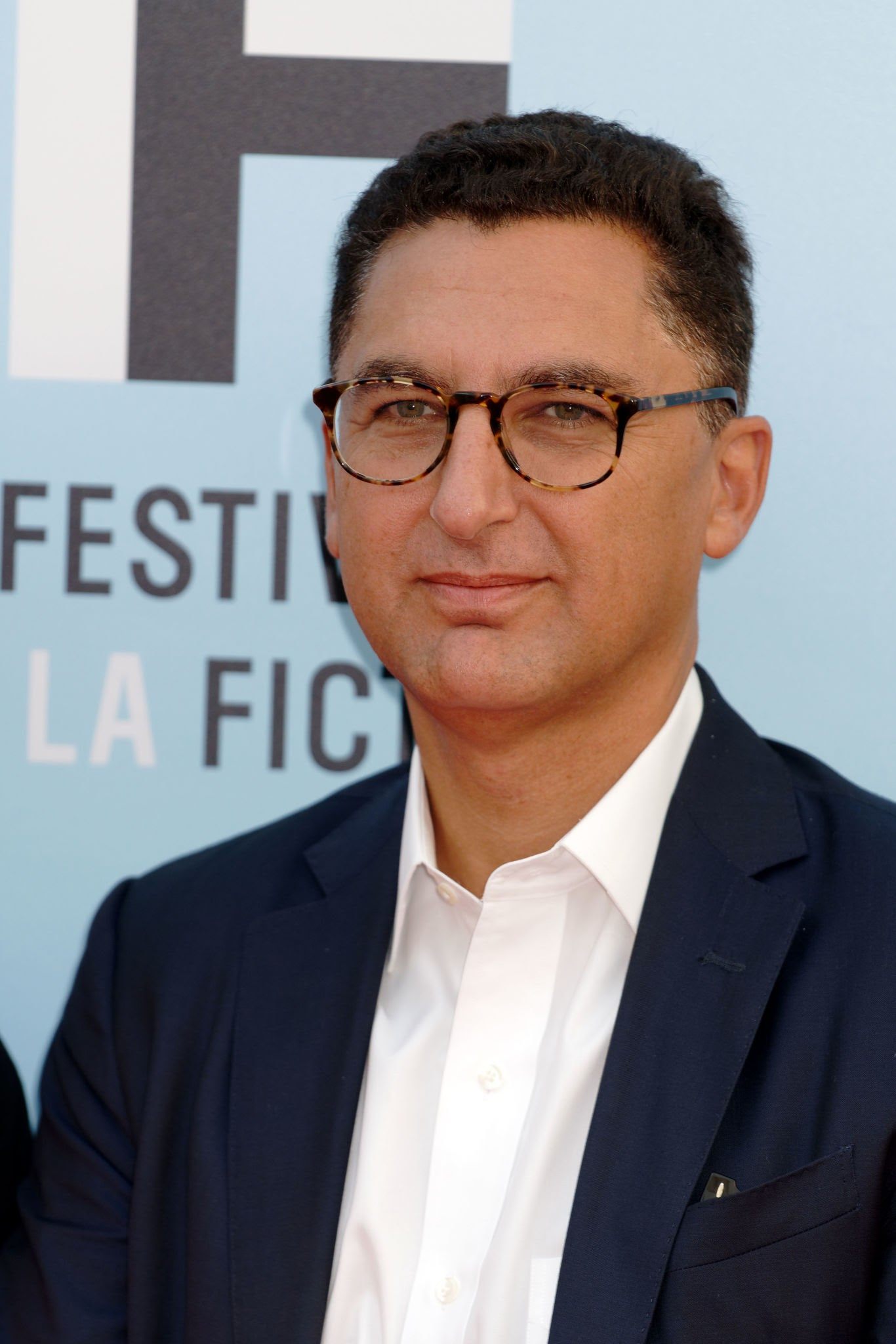
- Born: 9 June 1970 (age 56); Paris, France
- Education: Sciences Po; HEC Paris
- Occupation: CEO of Canal+ Group
- Predecessor: Vincent Bolloré

Maxime Saada (born June 9, 1970) is a French corporate executive. He is a Chairman and CEO of Canal+ Group, Chairman of Studiocanal, Dailymotion, and L’Olympia, and Vice-President of Lagardère Group.

== Education ==
He graduated from the Institut d'Études Politiques de Paris (Sciences Po) in 1992 and holds an MBA from HEC (1994).

== Career ==
Maxime Saada joined CANAL+ Group in 2004 as EVP of Strategy. He was involved in the merger between Canal+ and TPS and later took on roles as Marketing Director, Head of CANALSAT, and Commercial Director.

In January 2011, Saada was appointed Executive Vice President of CANAL+ Group in charge of Pay TV distribution in France.

In April 2013, he was appointed Executive Vice President of CANAL+ Pay TV France and later became Chief Executive Officer of CANAL+ Group in July 2015.

In January 2016, he was also appointed chairman and CEO of Dailymotion. In April 2018, he was appointed Chairman of CANAL+ Group's Management Board.

In May 2023, he was named Chairman of the Olympia, a venue in Paris. In October 2023, Maxime Saada received Variety Vanguard Award. The award acknowledges individuals in the television industry who have made a substantial impact on the global entertainment sector.
