= Émilie Tran Nguyen =

French journalist (born 1985)

- Born: 27 March 1985 (age 41); Marseille, France
- Education: École supérieure de commerce de Clermont-Ferrand; Institut Pratique du Journalisme
- Occupation: Journalist
- Years active: 2014–present
- Employer: France Télévisions
- Spouse: Maxime Darquier (m. 2018)
- Children: 2

Émilie Tran Nguyen (born 27 March 1985) is a French journalist who works for France Télévisions. She began working as an intern in Paris at firms such as Clarins and in the legal department at TF1 before becoming a freelancer journalist in Clermont-Ferrand. Nguyen later worked for Groupe Canal+ as a freelancer at the private continuous news channel iTélé and filled in for Émilie Besse, as presenter of the lunchtime edition of the Canal+ news programme La Nouvelle Édition in 2015. She was the presenter of the 12/13 news bulletin on France 3 from 2016 to 2023.

== Biography ==
On 27 March 1985, Nguyen was born in Marseille. Her father comes from Vietnam and is the owner of a small restaurant while her mother is from Algeria. Nguyen has two siblings and all three were raised to be encouraged to study and to strive for their goals. When she was three years old, the family moved to Clermont-Ferrand from La Canebière. Nguyen had considered becoming a paediatrician before she fainted from seeing blood and decided not to be a business manager due to her lack of business knowledge. Following the completion of her Baccalauréat, she took her graduate studies at the ESC Clermont Business School and at the Institut pratique du journalisme.

She began her working career as an intern in Paris at firms such as Clarins and in the legal department at TF1. After that, Nguyen was offered a permanent contract to work at Eurosport in its sales department managing advertising for the African, European and the Middle Eastern zones, which she rejected because she did not have the enthusiasm for the job. She returned to Clermont-Ferrand, and she commenced her career in journalism working as an freelancer at the Zap magazine and then as an intern for the local daily La Montagne newspaper in order to repay her student loans. Nguyen went on a two-year apprenticeship with France 3 at Soir 3 after a previous attempt was rejected and was mentored by editors-in-chief Arnauld Miguet and Jean-Jacques Basier. She was inspired by the likes of journalists Claire Chazal, Christine Ockrent and Anne Sinclair.

Nguyen was employed by the Groupe Canal+ on a work-study contract to work as a freelancer at the private continuous news channel iTélé in early 2014. She also had work at France 3 Centre some time later to make up the lack of on-screen work, and did some journalism work for the programme Télématin. The following year, Nguyen was appointed by channel director Maxime Saada to be the replacement presenter of the lunchtime edition of the news programme La Nouvelle Édition broadcast on Canal+ in place of Émilie Besse, who went on maternity leave from September of that year. In February 2016, Nguyen was appointed by Michel Field, the director of information at France Télévisions, to be a presenter of the news programme 12/13 on France 3 from 22 March 2016 as the replacement for Samuel Étienne.

In July 2017, she became a columnist for the Saturday access programme C l'hebdo broadcast on France 5 for the upcoming television season. Nguyen became the co-presenter with Éric Fottorino of the Wednesday evening France Info programme Ouvrez le 1 in January 2019. She replaced Maxime Switek as the news presenter of the news summary segment 5 sur 5 on the night time programme C à vous in July 2020.

Nguyen participated in the #AsiatiquesDeFrance campaign in March 2017, denouncing clichés of the Asian community in France that stem from people's childhood. She was an ambassador for the 2021 class of La Chance, the journalism school competition for scholarship students that has the objective to improving social and ethnic representation of society in the media.

== Personal life ==
She has been married to the columnist and journalist Maxime Darquier, since July 2018. They have two children. Nguyen does not disclose aspects of her private life, and was racially abused for being of Asian descent when she was a child.
