= Nico Cué =

Spanish union representative and politician

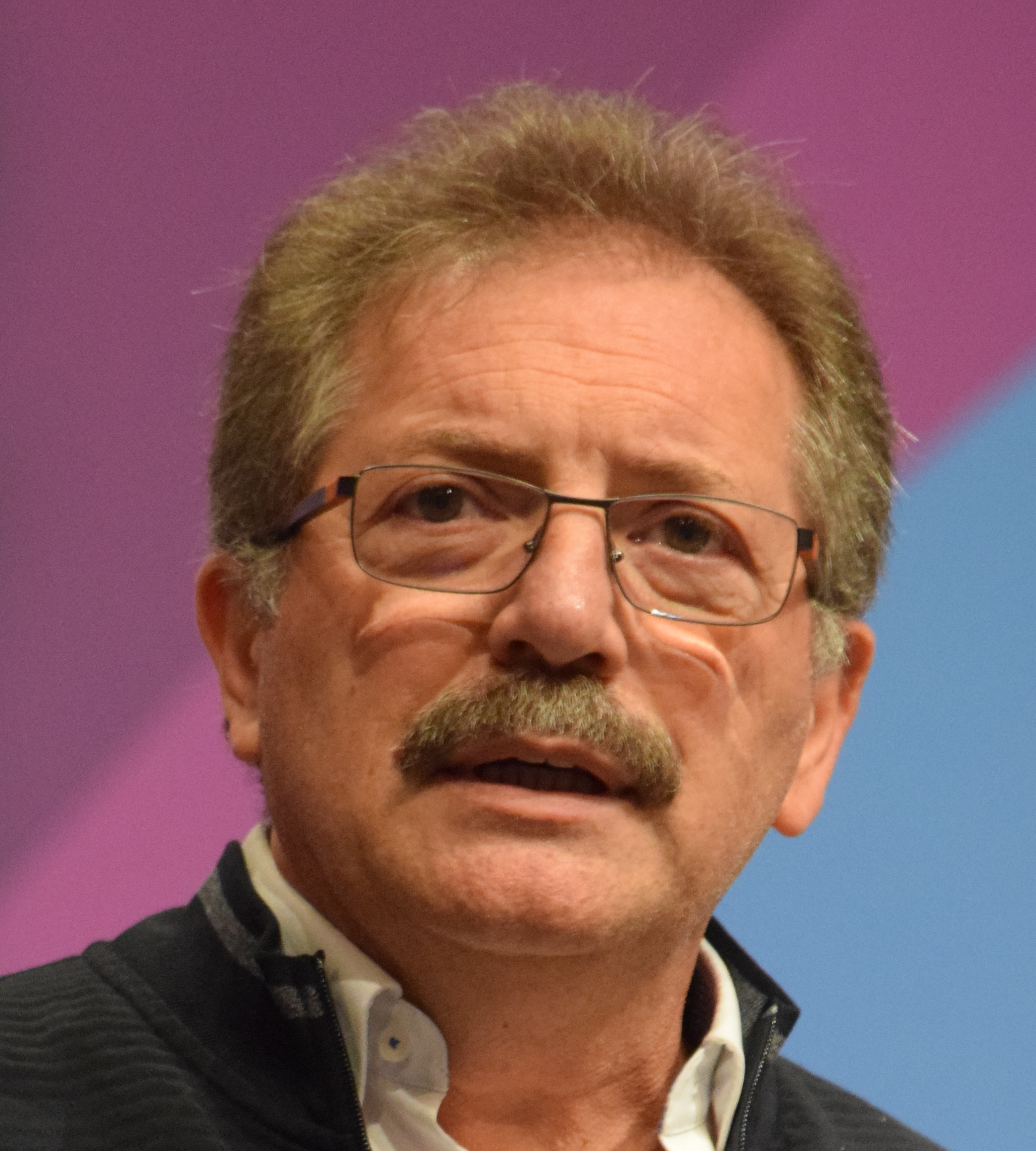
- Nico Cué in February 2019

Personal details
- Born: Nicanor Cué; 6 September 1956 (age 68); Mieres, Asturias, Spain
- Political party: European Union: Party of the European Left

Nicanor Cué (born 6 September 1956), known as Nico Cué, is a Spanish-born Belgian trade unionist and politician. He served as the General Secretary of the General Federation of Belgian Labour (FGTB) Metalworkers for two decades. In the 2019 European Parliament election, Cué and Violeta Tomić are European Left's lead candidates (Spitzenkandidaten) for the President of the European Commission. He was not elected.

== Early life and education ==
Nico Cué was born in Mieres, Asturias on 6 September 1956. His father, a miner, was forced to flee Francoist Spain to Belgium in 1962, after the miners' strikes of that year. He had no work permit and struggled to find a job until sympathisers with the republican cause in Belgium found him work in a mine near Liège. After a year, his wife and children could finally join him in Liège. He died suddenly in a car accident in 1968, leaving his wife to raise seven children.

Cué was educated at the local technical school and got his first job at the FN factory in Liège. He became politically active as a teenager and joined the FGTB trade union on getting his first job.

== Political career ==
In 1997, Cué stood as a rank-and-file candidate for the General Secretary of the Union of Belgian Metalworkers and won.

On 26–27 January, 2019, in Brussels, Cué and Slovene Violeta Tomić were voted by the Executive Board of the Party of the European Left as the top candidates for the 2019 European Parliament election.

== Personal life ==
Cué is married to an Italian. They have at least one son.
