= Dailymotion =

Video streaming site

- Logo used as of 2023
- Company type: Subsidiary
- Website type: Online video platform
- Available in: 149 countries and 183 languages
- Founded: 15 March 2005; 21 years ago
- Headquarters: 50 Rue Camille Desmoulins – 92130 Issy les Moulineaux, France
- Country of origin: France
- Area served: Worldwide
- Founders: Benjamin Bejbaum; Olivier Poitrey
- Chairperson: Maxime Saada
- CEO: CEO of Dailymotion SA: Guillaume Clement; CEO of Dailymotion Advertising SAS: Bichoi Bastha
- Key people: Benjamin Bejbaum (co-founder)
- Revenue: c. €100 million (milestone announced 2026; period unspecified)
- Employees: 450
- Parent: Canal+
- Website: dailymotion.com
- IPv6 support: No
- Advertising: Contextual and video ads
- Registration: mandatory
- Users: 300 million
- Launched: 15 March 2005
- Current status: Active

Head office: 140 Boulevard Malesherbes in Paris, France

Dailymotion is a French online video sharing platform owned by Canal+. Prior to 2024, it was owned by Vivendi. North American launch partners included Vice Media, Bloomberg, and Hearst Digital Media. Dailymotion was among the first platforms to support HD (720p) resolution video. It is available worldwide in 183 languages and 43 localised versions featuring local home pages and content. It has more than 300 million monthly users.

== History ==
The initial logo of Dailymotion, used from 2005 to 2015

In March 2005, Benjamin Bejbaum and Olivier Poitrey founded the website, pooling €6,000 (US $9,271) from six individuals to do so. In September 2006, Dailymotion raised funds in collaboration with Atlas Ventures and Partech International. In 2007, it created ASIC, together with other companies in the sector.

Dailymotion supports a high-definition video resolution of 720p since February 2008, making it one of the earliest known HD video platforms.

In October 2009, the French government invested in Dailymotion through the Strategic Investment Fund. On 25 January 2011, Orange acquired a 49% stake in Dailymotion for €62 million, valuing the company at €120 million.

On 10 January 2013, Orange bought the remaining 51% for €61 million. In early May 2013, the French government blocked Yahoo!'s acquisition of a majority stake in Dailymotion.

On 25 February 2014, Orange revealed it was in discussions with Microsoft about a deal that could see Dailymotion extend into the US market. In an interview with a local television station in Barcelona, Spain, Stéphane Richard, CEO of Orange, said there was "great hope" an agreement would be reached. Any deal would see Orange retain majority ownership of Dailymotion. Richard said his company was in talks with other potential partners as well, with a view to expanding Dailymotion's international appeal.

In 2015, Vivendi purchased an 80% stake in Dailymotion from Orange, increasing it to 90% that September.

In September 2020, Dailymotion partnered with Mi Video, the global video app developed by the Chinese electronics company Xiaomi, granting Mi Video users access to Dailymotion's global and regional music, entertainment, sports, and news catalogues.

Bold lowercase wordmark of Dailymotion, used from 2015 to 2023

=== Global locations ===
Dailymotion's head office is located in the Immeuble Horizons 17 in the 17th arrondissement of Paris. The company began expanding its physical presence internationally in 2007, when it opened an office in New York City. Since then, new offices have been opened in London (2009), San Francisco (2011), Singapore (2014), and Abidjan (2016).

=== Logo ===
Dailymotion's logo was changed in March 2015 to an all-lowercase bold wordmark. The website was extensively redesigned in 2017, and the wordmark was recoloured to light blue. In 2019, the wordmark was changed to monochrome. In May 2023 the wordmark was changed back to uppercase. Additionally, the icon was changed from a simple lowercase "d" to a 2.5D uppercase "D".

== Copyright cases and blocking of Dailymotion ==
In June 2007, Dailymotion was found liable for copyright infringement by a Paris high court. The judges held that Dailymotion is a hosting provider, and not a publisher, but that it must be held liable for copyright infringement, as it was aware of the presence of illegal content on its site. Such illegal content may be copyrighted material uploaded to Dailymotion by its users. The judges held that Dailymotion was aware that illegal videos were uploaded to its site, and that it must therefore be held liable for acts of copyright infringement, since it deliberately furnished the users with the means to commit those acts.

Dailymotion has been banned in Kazakhstan since August 2011.

The website was blocked in India in May 2012, but this decision was reversed the following month. The Madras High Court changed its earlier order, explaining that only specific URLs carrying illegally copied content should be blocked, not entire websites. Dailymotion was again banned in India in December 2014, due to government concerns that the site might be hosting videos pertaining to ISIS propaganda about Indian rule in Kashmir. A brief nationwide block occurred in late 2014 and early 2015 due to government security concerns, but access was officially restored within days.

In December 2014, Dailymotion was fined €1.3 million. The Paris Court of Appeal found that the site had infringed the copyright of French television station TF1 and the news channel LCI, ruling that Dailymotion had failed to take action against users illegally posting TF1 content online.

According to Guillaume Clément, Dailymotion's chief product and technology officer, as of 2017, the company employs a combination of human curation and automated tools to ensure copyright holder rights are protected within the destination, and it is able to remove questionable or illegal content within two hours.

Dailymotion has been permanently blocked in Russia since January 2017, since the Moscow City Court ruled that the site was repeatedly violating Russia's copyright law by providing access to illegal TV content.

== See also ==
- Comparison of video hosting services
