= List of Western films of the 2010s =

A list of Western films released in the 2010s.

| Title | Director | Cast | Release date | Country | Subgenre/notes |
|---|---|---|---|---|---|
2010
| 6 Guns | Shane Van Dyke | Greg Evigan, Barry Van Dyke, Shane Van Dyke, Sage Mears | March 6, 2010 | United States | |
| Aballay | Fernando Spiner | Pablo Cedrón, Nazareno Casero, Mariana Anghileri | | Argentina | |
| American Bandits: Frank and Jesse James | Fred Olen Ray | Peter Fonda, Tim Abell, Jeffrey Combs | | United States | Outlaw western |
| Bass Reeves | Brett William Mauser, James A. House | James A. House, Wesley Blake | | United States | Biographical western |
| Big Money Rustlas | Paul Andresen | Violent J, Shaggy 2 Dope | | United States | Hybrid western |
| Bunraku | Guy Moshe | Josh Hartnett, Demi Moore, Woody Harrelson, Ron Perlman, Kevin McKidd | 2010 | United States | Martial-arts action film with western elements |
| Chicogrande | Felipe Cazals | Damiàn Alcazàr, Daniel Martinez | May 28, 2010 | Mexico | Mexican Revolution |
| Les Colts de l'Or Noir | Pierre Romanello | Fredéric Ferrer, Romain Bertrand | | France | Euro-western |
| DC Showcase: Jonah Hex | Joaquim Dos Santos | Thomas Jane, Linda Hamilton, Jason Marsden | United States | Animated short western | |
| Dead West | Douglas Myers | Angélica Celaya, Clint James, J. Lyle Johnson | | United States | Horror western |
| A Foundling | Carly Lyn | Cindy Chiu, Tim Chiou | | United States | Sci-fi western |
| Gunless | William Phillips | Paul Gross, Sienna Guillory, Dustin Milligan | | Canada | Comedy western |
| Jonah Hex | Jimmy Hayward | Josh Brolin, John Malkovich, Megan Fox, Michael Fassbender, Will Arnett, Wes Bentley, Michael Shannon, Aidan Quinn, Lance Reddick, Tom Wopat | June 18, 2010 | United States | Supernatural western |
| The Last Rites of Ransom Pride | Tiller Russell | Dwight Yoakam, Jon Foster, Lizzy Caplan, Kris Kristofferson, Jason Priestley | June 17, 2010 | United States | |
| Let the Bullets Fly | Jiang Wen | Chow Yun-fat, Jiang Wen, Ge You | December 16, 2010 | China | Hybrid western |
| The Line Shack | John Adrian Riley | Jon Briddell, Steven K. Easterling, Jim Harworth | | United States | |
| Mad Mad Wagon Party | Dwight Brooks | George Kennedy, Cathy Rankin, Slade Hall | August 17, 2010 | United States | Comedy western |
| The Platinum Peacemaker | Bryant Hicks | Stephen Brodie, Cassie Shea Watson, Edward Fontaine | December 17, 2010 | United States | Comedy western |
| Prospectors: All In | Paul Bonsignore | Nicholas Armogida, Don Baugh | | United States | |
| Pure Country 2: The Gift | Christopher Cain | Katrina Elam, Travis Fimmel, Cheech Marin, Bronson Pinchot, Jackie Welch, Dean Cain, William Katt, Sharon Thomas, Michael Yama, George Strait | October 15, 2010 | United States | Contemporary western |
| Red Hill | Patrick Hughes | Ryan Kwanten, Steve Bisley, Tom E. Lewis, Claire van der Boom, Kevin Harrington | February 14, 2010 | Australia | Contemporary/outback western |
| The Righteous and the Wicked | Craig A. Butler | Craig Myers, Billy Garberina, Justin Tade | | United States | Traditional western |
| A River of Skulls | Suza Lambert Bowser | Trent Anderson, Aleph Ayin | | United States | Traditional western |
| Scape | Taegen Carter | Ben Furmaniak, Ludwig Manukian | | United States | Frontier western |
| Sheriff of Contention | Tom O'Mary | Angelo Ortega, Miguel Corona | | United States | |
| Single Action Colt | Scott Harpt | Barbra Halloy, Marc Brinck | | United States | Comedy western |
| Snowblind | Kilian Manning | Robert Lyons, Mala Ghedia | | Germany | Post-apocalyptic sci-fi western |
| True Grit | Joel Coen, Ethan Coen | Jeff Bridges, Matt Damon, Josh Brolin, Hailee Steinfeld, Barry Pepper, Domhnall Gleeson, J. K. Simmons | December 25, 2010 | United States | Traditional western |
| The Warrior's Way | Sngmoo Lee | Kate Bosworth, Danny Huston, Geoffrey Rush, Jang Dong-gun, Tony Cox, Ti Lung | December 3, 2010 | New Zealand | Fantasy western |
| Yahşi Batı | Ömer Faruk Sorak | Cem Yılmaz, Ozan Güven | January 1, 2010 | Turkey | Comedy western |
2011
| Billy the Kid & The Lincoln County War | Andrew A. Wilkinson | Shayne Armstrong, David Austin | December 1, 2011 | United States | Outlaw western |
| Black Hat | Sean Tracy | Shak Brenner, Edward Sheldon | June 30, 2011 | United States | |
| Blackthorn | Mateo Gil | Sam Shepard, Eduardo Noriega, Stephen Rea, Magaly Solier, Nikolaj Coster-Waldau, Padraic Delaney, Dominique McElligott | October 7, 2011 | Spain | Revisionist western |
| A Cold Day in Hell | Christopher Forbes | Karyn Belenke, Roman Bumgarnder, Kathryn Campbell | | United States | Traditional western |
| Cowboys & Aliens | Jon Favreau | Daniel Craig, Harrison Ford, Sam Rockwell, Olivia Wilde, Noah Ringer, Clancy Brown, Wes Studi, Keith Carradine, Noah Ringer, Adam Beach, Abigail Spencer, Walton Goggins, Julio Cedillo | July 29, 2011 | United States | Science-fiction western |
| Cowboys & Indians | Aaron Burk, Tyler Burk | Alvin Cowan, Steve Guilmette | | United States | |
| The Dead and the Damned | Rene Perez | David A. Lockhart, Camille Montgomery, Rick Mora | July 26, 2011 | United States | Horror western |
| A Fistful of Diamonds | David Keeling | John Boylan, John Carey | | Ireland | Contemporary western |
| For Robbing the Dead | Thomas Russell | Barry Corbin, Jon Gries, Edward Herrmann | | United States | Traditional western |
| Forgiven | Alan Autry | Ray Appleton, Mary Ann Conner | March 22, 2011 | United States | Traditional western |
| Goodnight for Justice | Jason Priestley | Luke Perry, Lara Gilchrist, Ron Lea | January 29, 2013 | United States; Canada | B western |
| The Gundown | Dustin Rikert | Peter Coyote, Veronica Diaz, Sheree J. Wilson | September 13, 2011 | United States | Traditional western |
| Hell at My Heels | Brett Kelly | Ian Quick, Frank Rothery | | Canada | B western |
| The Last Christeros | Matias Meyer | | September 11, 2011 | Mexico; Netherlands | Mexican western |
| The Legend of Hell's Gates | Tanner Beard | Eric Balfour, Lou Taylor Pucci, Henry Thomas | | United States | Outlaw western |
| Livin' by the Gun | James Miller | Jeffery Babineau, Pat McIntire | | United States | |
| Lone Tree Bench | Tolan Harber | Lily Gladstone, Robert Keli | | United States | |
| Love's Christmas Journey | David S. Cass, sr. | Natalie Hall, JoBeth Williams | November 5, 2011 | United States | Western family |
| Mattie | Michael Dohrmann | Kaylee DeFer, Rick Maddox | | United States | Western drama |
| Meek's Cutoff | Kelly Reichardt | Michelle Williams, Bruce Greenwood, Zoe Kazan, Paul Dano, Shirley Henderson, Will Patton | April 8, 2011 | United States | Traditional western |
| The Mountie | Wyeth Clarkson | Andrew W. Walker, Jessica Paré, Earl Pastko | July 1, 2011 | Canada | Canadian mountie western |
| Netherwood | Cristobal Araus Lobo | Owen Black, Will Hall | | New Zealand | |
| The Price | Zeke Pinheiro, James St. Vincent | Carlos Gallardo, Solomon Trimble | | United States | Post-modern western |
| Rango | Gore Verbinski | Johnny Depp, Isla Fisher, Abigail Breslin, Alfred Molina, Bill Nighy, Harry Dean Stanton, Ray Winstone, Timothy Olyphant, Ned Beatty, Beth Grant | March 4, 2011 | United States | Animated comedy western |
| Redemption | Joseph P. Stachura | Derek Burke, July Smith | October 16, 2011 | United States | Civil War western |
| Rìo de Oro | Pablo Aldrete | Gonzalo Lebrija, Stephanie Sigman | November 18, 2011 | Mexico; United States | Traditional western |
| Sal | Diego Rougier | Fele Martìnez, Gonzalo Valenzuela, Javiera Contador | | Chile; Argentina | Contemporary western |
| Say It with Bullets | D. W. Phillips | Larry Clabby, Darrin Fleming | | United States | |
| The Scarlet Worm | Michael Fredianelli | Aaron Stielstra, Dan van Husen, Brett Halsey | August 27, 2011 | United States | |
| Western Confidential | David Lawrence | Shauna Baker, Julian Black Antelope, Jonathan Brewer | October 15, 2011 | Canada | Comedy western |
| Yellow Rock | Nick Vallelonga | Michael Biehn, James Russo, Lenore Andriel | | United States | |
2012
| Casa de Mi Padre | Matt Piedmont | Will Ferrell, Gael García Bernal, Diego Luna | March 16, 2012 | United States | Comedy/satire modern-day western filmed in the style of an "overly dramatic telenovela" |
| Cole Younger & The Black Train | Christopher Forbes | Cody McCarver, Jerry Chesser, John Hudson | April 1, 2012 | United States | Traditional western |
| Dawn Rider | Terry Miles | Donald Sutherland, Christian Slater, Jill Hennessy | August 7, 2012 | United States | Traditional western |
| Dead Man's Burden | Jared Moshe | Barlow Jacobs, Clare Bowen, David Call | May 3, 2012 | United States | Traditional western |
| Django Unchained | Quentin Tarantino | Jamie Foxx, Christoph Waltz, Leonardo DiCaprio, Kerry Washington, Samuel L. Jackson, Don Johnson, Walton Goggins, James Remar, Dennis Christopher, Laura Cayouette, Tom Wopat, Quentin Tarantino, Franco Nero, Russ Tamblyn, Amber Tamblyn, Don Stroud, Bruce Dern, M. C. Gainey, Cooper Huckabee, Michael Parks, James Russo, Lee Horsley, Lewis Smith, Zoë Bell, Michael Bowen, Robert Carradine, Jake Garber, Ted Neeley, James Parks, Tom Savini | December 25, 2012 | United States | Spaghetti-style western set in the Southern frontier |
| Estrada de Palha | Rodrigo Areias | Vítor Correia, Nuno Melo | | Portugal | Euro-western |
| For Greater Glory | Dean Wright | Eva Longoria, Oscar Isaac, Andy García, Peter O'Toole, Oscar Isaac, Santiago Cabrera, Eduardo Verástegui, Rubén Blades, Nestor Carbonell, Bruce Greenwood, Bruce McGill | | Mexico | Mexican western |
| Gallowwalkers | Andrew Goth | Wesley Snipes, Kevin Howarth, Riley Smith | | United States | Weird West |
| Gang of Roses 2: Next Generation | Jean-Claude LaMarre | Charli Baltimore, Gabriel Casseus | | United States | Outlaw western |
| Good for Nothing | Mike Wallis | Cohen Holloway, Inge Rademeyer | May 3, 2012 | New Zealand | Romance western |
| Goodnight for Justice: The Measure of a Man | Kristoffer Tabori | Luke Perry, Cameron Bright, Eric Keenleyside | January 28, 2013 | United States | B western |
| El Gringo | Eduardo Rodriguez | Scott Adkins, Christian Slater | May 11, 2012 | United States | Contemporary western |
| Hannah's Law | Rachel Talalay | Sara Canning, Kimberly Elise, Greyston Holt | June 9, 2012 | United States; Canada | B western |
| Heathen and Thieves | Megan Peterson, John Douglas Sinclair | Andrew Simpson, Gwendoline Yeo, Don Swayze | | United States | Traditional western |
| The Man Who Shook the Hand of Vicente Fernandez | Elia Petridis | Ernest Borgnine, Barry Corbin, Carla Ortiz, Tony Plana, Robert Morse | April 27, 2012 | United States | Mexican western |
| Wyatt Earp's Revenge | Michael Feifer | Val Kilmer, Shawn Roberts, Daniel Booko | March 6, 2012 | United States | Traditional western |
2013
| 2 Pengo 2 Rengo | Mano Anandason | Yvo René Scharf, Martin Thon | | Germany | Euro-western |
| Alien Showdown: The Day the Old West Stood Still | Rene Perez | Robert Amstler, Nadia Lanfranconi, John J. Welsh | April 1, 2013 | United States | Sci-fi western |
| Billy the Kid | Christopher Forbes | Christopher Bowman, Kimberley Campbell, Taylor Grace-Davis | August 27, 2013 | United States | Outlaw B western |
| Dead in Tombstone | Roel Reiné | Danny Trejo, Mickey Rourke, Anthony Michael Hall | September 1, 2013 | United States | Fantasy western |
| Forajidos de la Patagonia | Damiàn Leibovich | Juan Manuel Rodil, Carla Pandolfi | | Argentina | Comedy western |
| Gold | Thomas Arslan | Nina Hoss, Uwe Bohm, Kindall Charters, Rosa Enskat, Peter Kurth, Marko Mandić, Wolfgang Packhäuser, Lars Rudolph | February 9, 2013 | Germany; Canada | Gold rush western |
| Goodnight for Justice: Queen of Hearts | Martin Wood | Luke Perry, Katharine Isabelle, Ricky Schroder | January 26, 2013 | United States | B western |
| The Lone Ranger | Gore Verbinski | Armie Hammer, Johnny Depp, William Fichtner, Tom Wilkinson, Barry Pepper, Helena Bonham Carter, Leon Rippy, James Frain | July 3, 2013 | United States | Action/adventure western |
| The Merchant | Justin Mosley, Allen Reed | Mathew Greer, David K. Shelton, Kari J. Kramer | March 3, 2013 | Australia; United States; United Kingdom | Fantasy/horror western |
| A Night in Old Mexico | Emilio Aragón | Robert Duvall, Jeremy Irvine, Angie Cepeda | | United States; Spain | Contemporany western |
| The Outlaw Michael Howe | Brendan Cowell | Damon Herriman, Mirrah Foulkes, Matt Day | December 1, 2013 | Australia | Meat pie western |
| Parallax | Meredith Mantik | Elgin Cahill, Jeff Bosley, Sam Steveson | December 1, 2013 | United States | Short contemporary western |
| The Retrieval | Chris Eska | Ashton Sanders, Tishuan Scott, Keston John | April 5, 2013 | United States | Western drama |
| Revelation Trail | John P. Gibson | Daniel Van Thomas, Daniel Britt, Jordan Elizabeth | April 12, 2013 | United States | Horror western |
| Shadow on the Mesa | David S. Cass, Sr. | Wes Brown, Kevin Sorbo, Gail O'Grady | July 3, 2013 | United States | B western |
| A Sierra Nevada Gunfight | Vernon E. Mortensen | Kirk Harris, Michael Madsen, John Savage | | United States | Traditional western |
| Sweet Vengeance | Logan Miller | Ed Harris, January Jones, Jason Isaacs, Eduardo Noriega, Jason Aldean, Amy Madigan | January 24, 2013 | United States | |
2014
| Algo más que morir | Oier Martínez de Santos and José Luis Murga | Laida Burguera, Kepa Jiménez, Maite Marcos, José Luis Murga, Javier Salazar | October 11, 2014 | Spain | Western |
| The Dark Valley | Andreas Prochaska | Sam Riley, Tobias Moretti, Helmuth Häusler | February 10, 2014 | Austria; Germany | Euro-western |
| Darkness on the Edge of Town | Patrick Ryan | Brian Gleeson, Emma Eliza Regan, Emma Willis | July 9, 2014 | Ireland | Contemporary western |
| Frontera | Michael Berry | Ed Harris, Eva Longoria, Michael Peña, Amy Madigan | July 31, 2014 | United States | Modern-day western |
| The Homesman | Tommy Lee Jones | Tommy Lee Jones, Hilary Swank, Hailee Steinfeld, Miranda Otto, Sonja Richter, Meryl Streep, John Lithgow, Tim Blake Nelson, Barry Corbin | May 18, 2014 | United States | Traditional western |
| A Million Ways to Die in the West | Seth MacFarlane | Seth MacFarlane, Amanda Seyfried, Charlize Theron, Liam Neeson, Giovanni Ribisi, Sarah Silverman, Neil Patrick Harris, Amanda Seyfried, Wes Studi, Christopher Lloyd, Ewan McGregor, Jamie Foxx, Ryan Reynolds, Patrick Stewart | May 30, 2014 | United States | Comedy western |
| The Salvation | Kristian Levring | Mads Mikkelsen, Eva Green, Jeffrey Dean Morgan, Michael Raymond-James, Jonathan Pryce | May 22, 2014 | Denmark | Euro-western |
| To the Hilt | Darko Mitrevski | Inti Sraj, Sashko Kocev, Martin Jordanoski, Toni Mihajlovski | September 14, 2014 | Macedonia | Euro-western |
| Wichita | Nicholas Barton | Justin France, Karina Wolfe, Blake Webb | April 10, 2014 | United States | Western/thriller |
2015
| Bone Tomahawk | S. Craig Zahler | Patrick Wilson, Kurt Russell, Jennifer Carpenter, Peter Sarsgaard | 2015 | United States | Horror western |
| Diablo | Lawrence Roeck | Scott Eastwood, Walton Goggins, Camilla Belle, José Zúñiga, Danny Glover, Nesta Cooper, Adam Beach, Joaquim de Almeida, Tzi Ma | October 2, 2015 | United States | Psychological western |
| Echoes of War | Kane Senes | James Badge Dale, Ethan Embry, William Forsythe | April 15, 2015 | United States | Ranchers-vs-settlers western |
| The Good, the Bad, and the Dead | Timothy Woodward Jr. | Johnny Messner, Dolph Lundgren, Danny Trejo, Vivica A. Fox, Michael Paré, Natsssia Malthe, John Laughlin, Angell Conwell | September 11, 2015 | United States | Crime thriller |
| The Hateful Eight | Quentin Tarantino | Kurt Russell, Channing Tatum, Tim Roth, Michael Madsen, Samuel L. Jackson, Bruce Dern, Demián Bichir, Walton Goggins, Jennifer Jason Leigh, Zoë Bell, James Parks | Dec 25, 2015 | United States | Spaghetti-style mystery western |
| The Keeping Room | Daniel Barber | Brit Marling, Hailee Steinfeld, Sam Worthington | September, 2015 | United States | Traditional western |
| The Revenant | Alejandro González Iñárritu | Leonardo DiCaprio, Tom Hardy, Will Poulter, Domhnall Gleeson | December 25, 2015 | United States | Traditional western |
| The Ridiculous 6 | Frank Coraci | Adam Sandler, Terry Crews, Jorge Garcia, Taylor Lautner, Rob Schneider, Luke Wilson, Nick Nolte, Steve Zahn, Danny Trejo, Harvey Keitel, Steve Buscemi, David Spade, Jon Lovitz, Blake Shelton, Vanilla Ice | December 11, 2015 | United States | Comedy western |
| Slow West | John Maclean | Michael Fassbender, Kodi Smit-McPhee, Ben Mendelsohn | 2015 | United States | Action western |
| The Timber | Anthony O'Brien | James Ransone, Josh Peck, Aracely Arambula, Ernesto Laguardia, Michelle Vieth, Francisco Gattorno, Daniela Castro, William Gaunt, David Brailie | February 27, 2015 | United States | Thriller western |
| Western Religion | James O'Brien | Peter Shinkoda, Claude Duhamel, Holiday Hadley, Peter Sherayko, Gary Kohn, Louie Sabatasso, Sam Bearpaw, James Anthony Cotton, Miles Szanto | October 9, 2015 | United States | Fantasy western |
2016
| Brimstone | Martin Koolhoven | Dakota Fanning, Guy Pearce, Carice van Houten, Kit Harington | 2016 | Netherlands | Mystery-thriller western |
| Dream Wagon | Asad Farr | Robert Miano, Gary Wasniewski | 2016 | United States | Comedy western |
| The Duel | Kieran Darcy-Smith | Liam Hemsworth, Woody Harrelson | June 24, 2016 | United States | Traditional western |
| Forsaken | Jon Cassar | Kiefer Sutherland, Donald Sutherland, Demi Moore | February 19, 2016 | United States | Western |
| The Free State of Jones | Gary Ross | Matthew McConaughey, Gugu Mbatha-Raw, Keri Russell | March 11, 2016 | United States | Civil War western |
| Hell or High Water | David Mackenzie | Jeff Bridges, Chris Pine, Ben Foster, Gil Birmingham, Marin Ireland, Katy Mixon, Dale Dickey, Kevin Rankin, Melanie Papalia, Amber Midthunder | August 12, 2016 | United States | Contemporary western |
| The Hollow Point | Gonzalo López-Gallego | Patrick Wilson, Lynn Collins, Ian McShane, John Leguizamo, Jim Belushi, Michael Flynn, Heather Beers, Nathan Stevens, David Fernandez Jr., David H. Stevens, Karli Hall, Derek Boone, Carl Hadra | December 16, 2016 | United States | Contemporary western |
| In a Valley of Violence | Ti West | John Travolta, Ethan Hawke, Taissa Farmiga | October 21, 2016 | United States | Traditional western |
| JL Ranch | Charles Robert Carner | Jon Voight, Teri Polo, James Caan, Melanie Griffith, Steven Bauer, Abby Brammell, Grant Bowler, Trevor Donovan, Nathan Keyes, Lee Purcell, Skyler Shaye | August 21, 2016 | United States | Contemporary western |
| Jane Got a Gun | Gavin O'Connor | Natalie Portman, Joel Edgerton, Ewan McGregor, Rodrigo Santoro, Noah Emmerich | January 29, 2016 | United States | Traditional western |
| The Magnificent Seven | Antoine Fuqua | Denzel Washington, Chris Pratt, Ethan Hawke, Vincent D'Onofrio, Byung-hun Lee | September 23, 2016 | United States | Traditional western |
| Outlaws and Angels | JT Mollner | Chad Michael Murray, Luke Wilson, Teri Polo, Frances Fisher, Francesca Eastwood | July 15, 2016 | United States | Traditional western |
| Traded | Timothy Woodward Jr. | Michael Paré, Trace Adkins, Tom Sizemore, Kris Kristofferson | June 10, 2016 | United States | Traditional western |
| West of Hell | Michael Steves | Lance Henriksen, Myko Olivier, Tony Todd | 2016 | United States | Supernatural western |
2017
| The Ballad of Lefty Brown | Jared Moshe | Bill Pullman, Jim Caviezel, Peter Fonda | 2017 | United States | Traditional western |
| The Beguiled | Sofia Coppola | Colin Farrell, Nicole Kidman, Kirsten Dunst, Elle Fanning, Angourie Rice, Oona Laurence | June 23, 2017 | United States | Thriller drama |
| The Dark Tower | Nikolaj Arcel | Idris Elba, Matthew McConaughey, Katheryn Winnick | July 28, 2017 | United States | Supernatural western |
| Hickok | Timothy Woodward Jr. | Luke Hemsworth, Trace Adkins, Kris Kristofferson, Bruce Dern, Cameron Richardson, Jason Lively | July 7, 2017 | United States | Traditional western |
| Hostiles | Scott Cooper | Christian Bale, Rosamund Pike, Jesse Plemons | December 23, 2017 | United States | Traditional western |
| The Jade Pendant | Leong Po-Chih | Clara Lee, Godfrey Gao, Russell Wong | November 3, 2017 | United States; Hong Kong | Romantic tragedy western |
| Logan | James Mangold | Hugh Jackman, Patrick Stewart, Richard E. Grant, Boyd Holbrook, Stephen Merchant, Dafne Keen | March 3, 2017 | United States | Revisionist science-fiction western |
| Sweet Country | Warwick Thornton | Hamilton Morris, Sam Neill, Bryan Brown | September 6, 2017 | Australia | Outback western |
| Wind River | Taylor Sheridan | Jeremy Renner, Elizabeth Olsen, Graham Greene, Kelsey Asbille, Gil Birmingham, Julia Jones, Martin Sensmeier, Apesanahkwat, Tantoo Cardinal, Jon Bernthal, James Jordan, Hugh Dillon, Matthew Del Negro | August 4, 2017 | United States | Mystery western |
2018
| The Ballad of Buster Scruggs | Joel Coen; Ethan Coen | Tim Blake Nelson, Willie Watson, David Krumholtz, James Franco, Stephen Root, Ralph Ineson, Liam Neeson, Harry Melling, Tom Waits, Zoe Kazan, Tyne Daly, Brendan Gleeson, Saul Rubinek | November 16, 2018 | United States | Traditional western |
| Big Kill | Scott Martin | Jason Patric, Lou Diamond Phillips, Christoph Sanders, Scott Martin, Clint Hummel, K.C. Clyde, Stephanie Beran, Elizabeth McLaughlin, Michael Paré, Audrey Walters, Jermaine Washington, Dennis LaValle, David Manzanares, Sarah Minnich | October 19, 2018 | United States | Revisionist Western |
| Buffalo Boys | Mike Wiluan | Ario Bayu, Mike Wiluan, Yoshi Sudarso, Pevita Pearce, Tio Pakusadewo | July 19, 2018 | Indonesia | Martial arts western |
| Damsel | David Zellner, Nathan Zellner | Robert Pattinson, Mia Wasikowska, Robert Forster, David Zellner, Nathan Zeller, Joseph Billingiere | June 22, 2018 | United States | Comedy western |
| The Sisters Brothers | Jacques Audiard | John C. Reilly, Joaquin Phoenix, Jake Gyllenhaal, Riz Ahmed, Rutger Hauer, Carol Kane, Rebecca Root, Ian Reddington, Richard Brake, Allison Tolman | September 21, 2018 | United States | Comedy western |
| The Wind | Emma Tammi | Caitlin Gerard, Ashley Zukerman, Julia Goldani Telles, Miles Anderson | September 10, 2018 | United States | Horror western |
| Woman Walks Ahead | Susanna White | Jessica Chastain, Michael Greyeyes, Chaske Spencer, Sam Rockwell | June 29, 2018 | United States | Biographical drama western |
2019
| Badland | Justin Lee | Kevin Makely, Mira Sorvino, Bruce Dern, Wes Studi, Trace Adkins, James Russo, Jeff Fahey, Amanda Wyss, Tony Todd | November 1, 2019 | United States | Revisionist western |
| Deadwood: The Movie | Daniel Minahan | Timothy Olyphant, Ian McShane, Molly Parker, Paula Malcomson, W. Earl Brown, Dayton Callie, Kim Dickens, Brad Dourif, Anna Gunn, John Hawkes, Gerald McRaney, Leon Rippy, William Sanderson, Robin Weigert, Brent Sexton, Sean Bridgers, Geri Jewell, Jeffrey Jones, Franklyn Ajaye, Keone Young, Peter Jason, Cleo King, Tony Curran, Jade Pettyjohn, Don Swayze | May 31, 2019 | United States | Revisionist western |
| Eminence Hill | Robert Conway | Barry Corbin, Dominique Swain, Lance Henriksen, Clint James, Owen Conway, Anna Harr, Brinke Stevens | November 1, 2019 | United States | Revisionist western |
| First Cow | Kelly Reichardt | John Magaro, Orion Lee, Toby Jones, Ewen Bremner, Scott Shepherd, Gary Farmer, Lily Gladstone | August 30, 2019 | United States | Western |
| The Kid | Vincent D'Onofrio | Ethan Hawke, Dane DeHaan, Chris Pratt, Adam Baldwin, Vincent D'Onofrio, Keith Jardine, Jenny Gabrielle | March 8, 2019 | United States | Biographical western |
| Never Grow Old | Ivan Kavanagh | Emile Hirsch, Deborah Francois, John Cusack, Danny Webb, Tim Ahern, Sam Louwyck, Antonia Campbell-Hughes, Paul Reid, Blake Berris, Anne Coesens, Paul Ronan | March 15, 2019 | United States | Action western |
| The Outsider | Timothy Woodward Jr. | Jon Foo, Trace Adkins, Sean Patrick Flanery, Kaiwi Lyman-Mersereau, Danny Trejo | June 14, 2019 | United States | Revisionist western |
| To Hell and Gone | Kyle Moore | Susan Gayle Watts, Carr Cavender, P.J. Marshall, Robert Morgan, Clayton Froning, Drew Connick, Rob Nagle | April 13, 2019 | United States | Spaghetti western |

== See also ==
- List of Western television series
