= James O'Brien (filmmaker) =

American film director

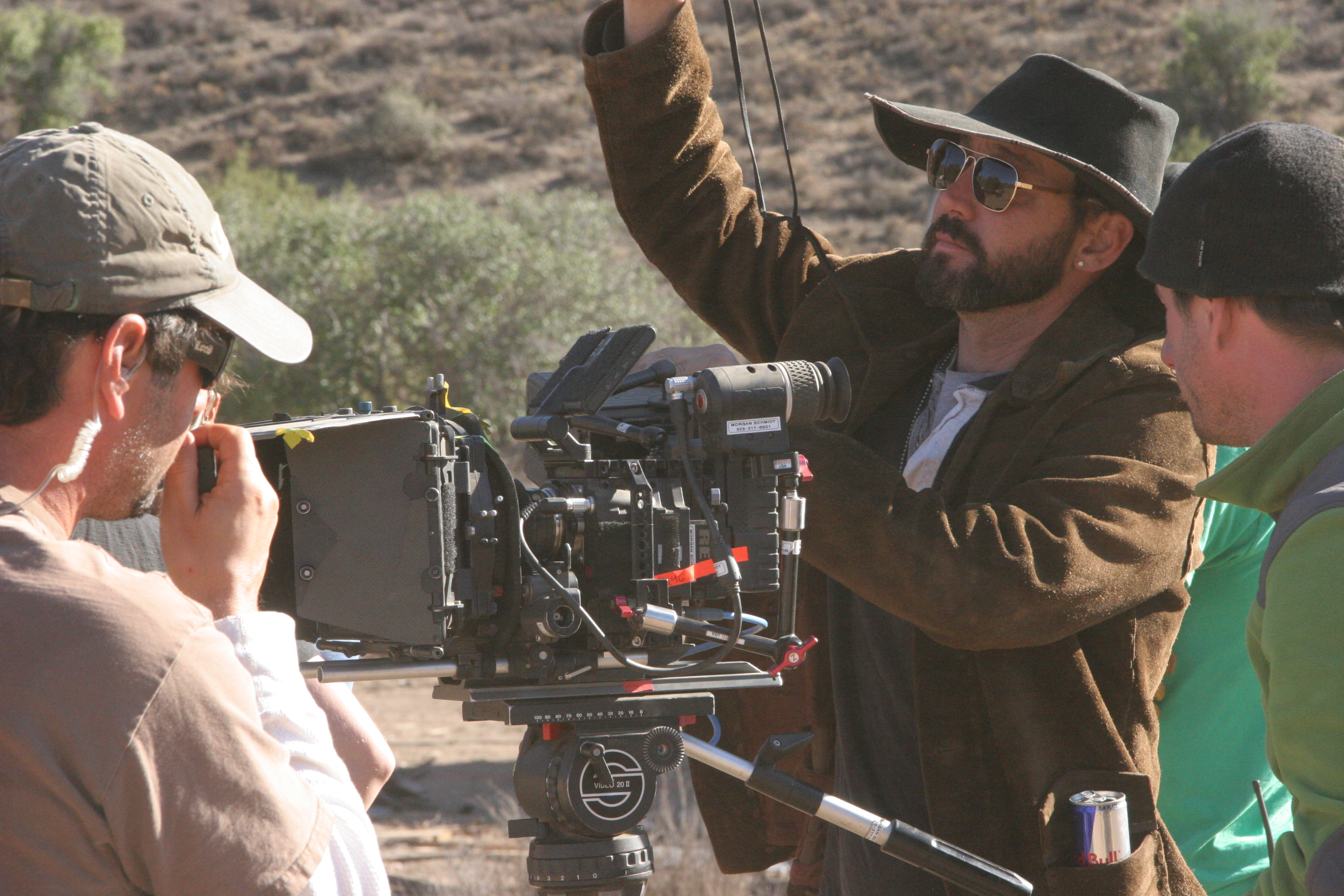
- James O'Brien (middle) on the set of Western Religion
- Born: James Edward O'Brien
- Education: Providence College
- Occupations: Film director, screenwriter, film producer
- Years active: 1993–present

James O'Brien is an American independent film director, producer, screenwriter and author.

== Early life and education ==
Raised in Harrington Park, New Jersey, O’Brien attended Bergen Catholic High School, and was a captain of the cross country and track teams. He is a graduate of Providence College, and competed in his early collegiate years for Ray Treacy's Providence Friars.

Midway through college, O'Brien shifted gears from athletics to English and Drama, directing a number of university-screened short films and documentaries and acting in the Blackfriars Theatre productions.

After backpacking Europe, and inspired by the DIY cinema of Jim Jarmusch, Spike Lee and Richard Linklater, O’Brien moved to Los Angeles, to make independent films.

== Early career ==
The first film he made after moving to LA was Bastard, a B&W short about a schizophrenic hit man. It was selected by the American Cinematheque to open for Werner Herzog’s Nosferatu the Vampyre at a 1993 Directors Guild of America retrospective.

== Venice Bound ==
O'Brien's debut feature Venice Bound follows the lives of three off-beat twenty-somethings who meet by chance on Venice Beach and agree to pull a robbery. The film debuted at the Orpheum Theatre in downtown Los Angeles before making its international premiere at Cannes.

Variety called O'Brien a "talent in the raw," and while the film is "too narratively chaotic and technically hamstrung to connect commercially" it also "keeps one glued to the screen."

Venice Bound was released theatrically in 1996–97, playing an extended run at the Aero Theatre in Santa Monica, and the Laemmle Sunset 5 (now Sundance Sunset Cinemas). It also played on the east coast at the Cable Car Cinema in Providence, Rhode Island.

== Wish You Were Here and Hyperfutura ==
Wish You Were Here stars Louie Sabatasso, Gary Douglas Kohn and Arroyn Ambrose in a road adventure film about the effects of addiction and the bond of family and friends.

Jonathan Freeman-Anderson of LA Film and Music Magazine called the film "an entertaining and soul searching ride of comical and sobering proportions". Nelson Madison Films released the movie in 2013 .

On the other end of the spectrum, O'Brien made the mashup Hyperfutura. Created with Eric Kopatz, producer and star of Bastard, the science fiction film Hyperfutura involves genetic engineering, mind control and time travel. It has polarized audiences since its 2013 worldwide digital release by PanGlobal Entertainment.

Chris Garcia, the museum culture specialist behind the visual arts podcast, Three Minute Modernist and the film journal Klaus at Gunpoint, included the film in his 52 Episodes to Science Fiction Literacy, linking it to the works of artist Bruce Conner and the Stanley Kubrick epic 2001: A Space Odyssey, in the episode entitled: "Hyperfutura: Avant-Garde or Really Messed Up?"

== Western Religion ==
O’Brien's most notable directing work is the independent Western film Western Religion. It features Claude Duhamel, Peter Shinkoda and Miles Szanto, among others.

The 'making of' story of the production was first picked up by Variety in 2013 as the filmmakers looked to overcome the government shutdown of all national parks just weeks before their scheduled shoot at Paramount Ranch. To remedy the situation, O'Brien and his producing partner Louie Sabatasso of 3rd Partner Productions enlisted Peter Sherayko, who had worked on Tombstone. Together, they built a Western tent city in the mountains of Agua Dulce, California. Sherayko, who played Texas Jack Vermillion in Tombstone, is also featured in the film as Southern Bill. Sabatasso plays a lead as the eccentric, deadly dandy Salt Peter.

== Recent Work ==
O'Brien was tapped to do additional writing on the Lionsgate film The Night They Came Home, a western thriller about the infamous Rufus Buck Gang. It was written by Night of the Living Dead screenwriter John A. Russo, based on his book of the same name. It stars Brian Austin Greene, Danny Trejo, and Robert Carradine and was released theatrically nationwide in 2024.

in 2024, O'Brien did the screenplay adaptation for the controversial novel The Lost Diary of Anne Frank, by the Texas pastor and congressional candidate Dr. Johnny Teague.

In the late summer of 2025, he joined the production of Death of a Brewer, a period drama set in Iowa City in 1884, about the riots surrounding the prohibition efforts. He plays Anton Stein, the killer whose violence instigated the counter reaction of the Temperance movement. It stars Crispin Glover, Mena Suvari, Jefferson White, and Tyler Posey.

== Selected filmography ==
- Bastard (short film, 1993)
- Venice Bound (1995)
- Hyperfutura (2013)
- Wish You Were Here (2013)
- Western Religion (2015)
- The Night They Came Home (2024)

== Bibliography ==
- (2021) political anthology, Parting the Washington Sea
- (2025) novel, Alias John Titor
