= The Dead and the Damned 2 =

- Film poster
- Directed by: Rene Perez
- Written by: Rene Perez
- Produced by: Michael Flanagan
- Starring: Richard Tyson; Raven Lexy; Jenny Allford; Christopher Kriesa
- Cinematography: Rene Perez
- Edited by: Rene Perez
- Music by: Rene Perez
- Distributed by: Inception Media Group
- Release date: October 7, 2014
- Running time: 90 minutes
- Country: United States
- Language: English

The Dead and the Damned 2 (also The Dead, the Damned, and the Darkness and Tom Sawyer vs Zombies) is a 2014 American horror film written and directed by Rene Perez. It was released direct-to-video on October 7, 2014, and is the sequel to the 2010 film The Dead and the Damned.

== Plot ==
A woman is hiding in a house with a little girl when it is besieged by zombie's. The woman sacrifices herself and allows the little girl to run away as they are surrounded. The woman is bitten and killed by the grotesque monsters.

Lt. Colonel Sawyer is driving through the aftermath of the outbreak, he happens upon a Sheriff and his two deputies who explain that he must turn back as the road ahead is infested with zombie's. He reluctantly agrees and shows he is a peaceful man. Hours later he finds another deputy who sympathises with his desire to go into the danger zone and allows him to breach the barricade.

Meanwhile, another survivor, Stephanie is shown scavenging for food, she is about to enter a grocery store when a male survivor happens upon her and warns her the store is riddled with the undead and it is unsafe. She is mute and does not understand at first but the stranger offers her food and shelter back at his safe with his sister and daughter. On the way back the stranger tells Stephanie his mother will cook her food and Stephanie becomes concerned. She politely declines his invitation and he attacks her and attempts to rape her. Stephanie escapes when a zombie attacks and devours her attacker.

Stephanie flees to a building site to rest but zombies gather and she is forced up a crane for safety. Sawyer happens upon her and saves her and he promises to help her. Although Stephanie is reluctant to trust him.

Later Sawyer and Stephanie meet a kindly survivor named Wilson who explains that the zombies are becoming weaker as they starve and he believes a damn nearby may be a safe place. Sawyer promises to see them safely to the dam but he confesses his mission is to scatter the ashes of his wife and daughter who were killed, in the ocean as he had promised to take them before the outbreak. While Sawyer and Wilson talk Stephanie, who is still shaken from her earlier attack quietly sneaks away - feeling unsafe. She hides in a shop but is attacked. Sawyer and Wilson save her and they head to the dam.

When Sawyer reaches the ocean he scatters his families ashes and contemplates suicide, holding a gun to his temple. He is distracted when he hears screams for help.

He finds Stephanie and Wilson helplessly watching a group of women and children being attacked by zombie's, the group help them and one woman explains that the damn is unsafe and the children as orphans. Sawyer then finds one of the children is his daughter Rosette. They reunite and the survivors take refuge in an office building.

Wilson and one of the survivors, Victoria, become friendly but she reveals to him they do not want to be around a soldier, believing the military caused the outbreak after a video broadcast by the vice president claimed the virus was purposefully released to control the population. Sawyer overhears and promises he had no idea and offers to clear out the infested dam to prove his loyalty to the group.

Sawyer enters the dam and dispatches the horde of zombies making it safe for the survivors.

In the end he finally takes his daughter to see the ocean and they both seem happy.

== Cast ==
- Robert Tweten as Lt. Colonel Sawyer
- Iren Levy as Stephanie
- John J. Welsh as Wilson
- Richard Tyson as Sheriff
- Jenny Allford as Mrs. Sawyer
- Christopher Kriesa as Speaker of the House Gates
- David A. Lockhart as Mortimer

== Production ==
Filming took place in Redding, California.

== Release ==
Inception Media Group released it on DVD and video on demand on October 7, 2014.

== Reception ==
Mark Burger of Yes! Weekly wrote that it has a "few good moments, but by any title it's nothing we haven't seen a lot of recently". Matt Boiselle of Dread Central rated it 2.5/5 stars and wrote, "[I]f you're simply willing to accept this as another run-of-the-mill zombie shoot-em-up, you should give it a go." Todd Martin of HorrorNews.Net wrote, "I really enjoyed The Dead and the Damned 2 and thought that it was one of the best zombie movies I've seen in a very long time."
