= Turok: Son of Stone (film) =

2008 American film

- Theatrical release poster
- Directed by: Curt Geda; Dan Riba; Frank Squillace; Tad Stones
- Screenplay by: Tony Bedard
- Story by: Evan Baily; Tony Bedard
- Based on: Turok: Son of Stone by Western Publishing
- Produced by: Evan Baily; F.J. DeSanto (co-producer); Mike Weiss (co-producer)
- Starring: Adam Beach; Irene Bedard; Adam Gifford
- Edited by: Matt Steinauer
- Music by: James L. Venable
- Production companies: Classic Media; Film Roman Productions; Starz Media
- Distributed by: Genius Products
- Release date: February 5, 2008
- Running time: 73 minutes
- Country: United States
- Language: English

Turok: Son of Stone is a 2008 American adult animated science fiction action adventure direct to video film featuring the Western Publishing character of the same name, produced by Classic Media and distributed by Genius Products.

== Plot ==
In the 19th century, a Native American warrior, named Turok, avenges the slaughter of his family while fighting dinosaurs and another Native American named Chichak who now leads a hostile tribe of cavemen.

== Voice cast ==
- Adam Beach as Turok
- Irene Bedard as Catori
- Adam Gifford as Andar
- Cree Summer as Sepinta
- Jay Tavare as Koba
- Mia Crowe as Aniwa
- Gil Birmingham as Nashoba
- Rick Mora as Young Turok / Cliff Person
- Iyari Limon as Young Catori
- Matthew Yang King as Young Nashoba / Young Cliff Brave
- Michael Horse as Chief / Lead Raider
- Russell Means as Shaman / Chief Sentry
- Graham Greene as Lost Land Shaman / Elder #1
- Tatanka Means as Bridge Sentry
- Peter Macon as Tower Sentry
- Tom Virtue as Old Man
- Robert Knepper as Chichak

== Reception ==
Geek.com said that "although there are no Oscar-worthy performances, Turok: Son of Stone has a lot of heart." Play wrote: "It looks like a kids show, but kids can't watch it, and it plays like an adult cartoon but lacks the visual flair to attract anyone over the age of twelve."

== See also ==
- List of films featuring dinosaurs
