= Rufus Buck Gang =

Outlaw Native American gang

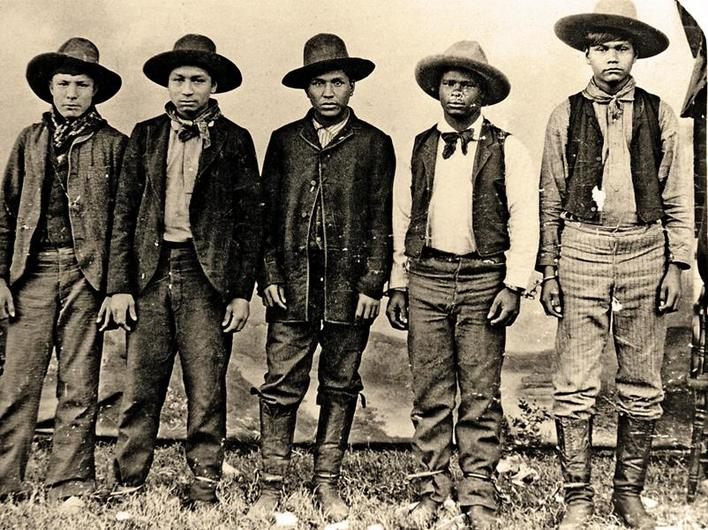
- Left to right: Maoma July; Sam Sampson; Rufus Buck; Lucky Davis; Lewis Davis.
- Founded: July 28, 1895
- Founding location: Indian Territory
- Years active: 1895
- Ethnicity: Creek
- Membership: Rufus Buck, Lewis Davis, Sam Sampson, Maoma July, Lucky Davis
- Activities: Armed robbery, murder, rape

The Rufus Buck Gang was an outlaw Native American gang whose members were Creek Indian and African American. Their crime spree took place in the Indian Territory of the Arkansas–Oklahoma area from July 30, 1895, through August 4, 1895.

The gang was formed by Rufus Buck, who was reportedly motivated by anger over white people moving into the Indian Territory and also a desire to gain local notoriety. The other members were Lewis Davis, Sam Sampson, Maoma July, and Lucky Davis. The gang began building up a small stockpile of weapons while staying in Okmulgee, Oklahoma. After killing U.S. Deputy Marshal John Garrett on July 30, 1895, the gang began holding up various stores and ranches in the Fort Smith area during the next two weeks. In one incident, a salesman named Callahan – after being robbed – was offered a chance to escape if he could outrun the gang. When the elderly Callahan successfully escaped, the gang killed his assistant in frustration.

At least two female victims who had been raped by the gang died of their injuries.

== List of crimes committed by the gang ==
- July 30, 1895: Killing of Deputy Marshal John Garrett near Okmulgee
- July 31, 1895: The gang came across a white woman named Mary Wilson and her 14-year-old son Charles, and neighborhood boy Malcolm Wright in a second wagon. The gang robbed Wilson and Lucky Davis raped her at gunpoint.
- They killed a black boy and beat Ben Callahan until they mistakenly believed he was dead, then took Callahan's boots, money, and saddle.
- Robbing of country stores of West and J. Norrberg at Orket, Oklahoma
- Murder of two white women and a 14-year-old girl
- August 4: Rape of Rosetta Edwards Hassan near Sapulpa, Oklahoma. Two other female victims who were raped by the gang, a Miss Ayers and an Indian girl near Sapulpa, died. A victim, Mrs Wilson, was reported to have recovered; it is reported that, after their capture, the gang was almost lynched.

== Capture and hanging of the gang ==
Continuing attacks on both local settlers and Creek indiscriminately, the gang was captured outside Muskogee by a combined force of lawmen and Indian police of the Creek Light Horse, led by Marshal S. Morton Rutherford, on August 10. While the Creek wanted to hold the gang for trial, the men were brought before "Hanging" Judge Isaac C. Parker. He twice sentenced all five defendants to death for the gang rape of Rosetta Edwards Hassan, the first sentence not being carried out pending an ultimately unsuccessful appeal to the U.S. Supreme Court. Buck and the Davis brothers received an additional death sentence for the murder of Deputy Marshal Garrett.

The five men were all hanged on July 1, 1896, at 1 PM at Fort Smith.

The executions of the Rufus Buck Gang were the only ones for rape by Judge Parker's court. These were also the last non-military executions for rape by the U.S. government until the executions of George and Michael Krull in 1957.

== Depiction in culture ==
A slightly modified account of the gang's crimes is the basis for the novel Winding Stair by Douglas C. Jones.

The Buck gang, "Hanging Judge" Isaac C. Parker, half-black, half-Indian outlaw Cherokee Bill, and the socio-political environment at the death of Indian Territory are the subjects of the 2011 historical novel I Dreamt I Was in Heaven - The Rampage of the Rufus Buck Gang by Leonce Gaiter.

The gang was featured in the 2019 film Hell on the Border.

The story of the gang served as an inspiration for the 2021 Western film The Harder They Fall, in which Rufus Buck was portrayed by Idris Elba.

The 2024 movie The Night They Came Home is about the gang. It stars Brian Austin Green, Danny Trejo, and Peter Sherayko (Tombstone), with a cameo by The D.O.C.

== See also ==
- Brooks–McFarland feud
