= Brooks–McFarland feud =

Family feud from 1896 to 1902 in Oklahoma, USA

- Date: 1896–1902
- Location: Creek Nation, Indian Territory, USA
- Outcome: ~5 killed 1 wounded

The Brooks–McFarland feud was a family feud that took place between 1896 and 1902, in what is now the state of Oklahoma. It began after the death of Thomas Brooks on August 24, 1896. The Brooks family blamed the McFarlands and from there followed a series of confrontations that culminated in a historic shootout at Spokogee on September 22, 1902. During the shootout, Willis Brooks and two others were killed while a fourth man was seriously wounded. The feud ended about three weeks later, on October 10, 1902, when Jim McFarland was ambushed and killed near his home. According to the author Edward Herring: "The deaths of Willis Brooks and Jim McFarland signaled the end of an era when disputes were settled with gun smoke and hot lead. With them also died the old feud."

== Background ==
Brooks Faction

In April 1884, Sheriff Alex Heflin decided he had enough of the Brooks family and he deputized some local men and attempted to make arrests. A gunfight occurred on April 14. Gaines and a citizen named Phillips of the Sheriff's party were killed while Henry and two more deputies were wounded. Henry was hit in one of his legs and after it was amputated he became known as "Peg Leg" Brooks. The Brooks family then went West. For the next six years they lived in Cooke County, Texas, but, in 1890, Willis II, who was now the leader of the family, moved north to the Chickasaw Nation, in the Indian Territory. He didn't stay for long though; in 1894 he moved his family again. This time to a new settlement known as Dogtown, twenty-five miles west of Eufaula, in the Creek Nation.

McFarland Faction

The McFarland family was smaller than that of the Brooks, but had an equally questionable history prior to the beginning of the feud in 1896. Jim McFarland was the leader. According to Edward Herring, the Riddles joined the McFarlands because Willis Brooks attempted to have the former "driven out of the area," sometime before 1896.

== The feud ==
The feud began with the death of Thomas Brooks on April 24, 1896. The Brooks family blamed the McFarlands. Willis claimed that Jim enticed his son into committing the crime. From there the situation slowly escalated, both sides vowed to shoot each other on sight. Since both factions weren't above cattle and horse theft, and the Dogtown area was known for being infested with rustlers, it is likely that at least one of the families was involved in stealing livestock from the other. According to Ken Butler, one of Henry's family members lived nearby and delivered him "syrup" and other food while he was imprisoned. The "syrup" was actually a certain type of acid that could dissolve metal. Henry applied the acid to the metal bars in his jail cell whenever he could and he hollowed out his peg leg to hide the bottle.

The railroad and the founding of Spokogee

George Sparks, a Fort Smith banker, and Cliff Speer, the owner of a hardware store in Fort Smith, controlled town site privileges along the new railroad, but because it was to pass through Creek territory they were unable to capitalize on their concession. Instead they contracted two Oklahoma attorneys, S. Morton Rutherford, and his young partner, Jesse Hill, to handle it for them. Knowing that the Brookses and McFarlands would be a problem, Rutherford and Hill visited both families to make it clear that they had not taken a side in the conflict.

On July 1, 1902, when the town lots in the new railway were to be auctioned outside the promoter's office, an argument broke out between John Brooks, son of Willis, and Lon Riddle, son of McFarland ally George Riddle. Brooks threatened Riddle with his six-shooter and was disarmed by camp manager G.G. Tyson. Brooks then began hitting Riddle with brass knuckles and knocked him to the ground, so Tyson intervened again to take the weapon away. However, before the fight resumed, John's uncle, Sam Baker, armed himself with his rifle and pointed it at Riddle. Hill, who was standing nearby, pushed Baker's rifle barrel toward the ground and said: "Don't act a fool." Baker then released his hold on the rifle, drew his revolver, and pointed it at Hill's face. Rutherford then armed himself and pointed his weapon at Sam while the latter's sixteen-year-old son, Bill, grabbed his rifle and pointed at Rutherford. The situation was very tense for a moment, but the "cool headed" Cliff Speer managed to diffuse it by slowly lowering Rutherford's rifle barrel and allowing Sam a chance to leave. When Sam was out of firing range, Bill lowered his weapon as well and they both left to tell Willis. Jesse Hill said the following about that day: "It was the first and only time I ever looked down a gun barrel.... Willis Brooks and his cohorts, each mounted and armed, rode up to do battle.... Unless something was done to stay the upcoming disaster, potential buyers would not become lot-owners. To my surprise, Rutherford entered the scene. Rutherford addressed the leader of each side in turn, at times bombastically belligerent, at times profanely pacific, but at all times profusely perspiring. He talked the two sides out of battle, but all of this had a bad effect on the crowd." In spite of the interruption, Rutherford and Hill managed to make $14,000, and more over the next few days. After the sale, the new land owners began building houses and businesses, but the town "refused to boom" because of the feud. Although Spokogee quickly grew to support a population of 150 people, Hill described them as nervous, especially when the McFarland or the Brooks families rode in heavily armed. Hill eventually left town because of the stress, some of which was brought about by George Riddle, who had a bad habit of pulling his gun on anyone over any kind of altercation.

Gunfight at Spokogee

According to Edward Herring, after the July 1 incident, the McFarland faction was ready to kill the Brooks' whenever the opportunity presented itself. The opportunity came on September 22, 1902, after a thunderstorm passed over the area. At the Brooks Ranch the rain scattered some of the cattle and it prevented the men from working the farm. Because of this, Henry "Peg Leg" Brooks and his nephew, Earl, went out to roundup the livestock while Willis and two of his other sons, Clifton and John, mounted up to ride into town for the mail. Meanwhile, the McFarlands and the Riddles had anticipated their arrival, due to the rain. They came up with a plan to ambush the Brooks' in town, but in a way that made it appear as though it was self-defense. The McFarlands took up positions across the street from the post office and then sent George Riddle out to "take care of some errands." However, Riddle's real intention was to confront the Brooks' and provoke a fight. When Willis and his sons rode into town later that morning, they dismounted and tied their horses up in front of the post office. Then, as the three were entering the building, Riddle came out of the door with his mail. The Brooks' immediately began making threats and Riddle said something to this effect: "Kill me if you want, I am unarmed and have but one time to die." Herring says that the plan worked perfectly, Willis and his sons cursed Riddle and then drew their weapons on him, but he hastily ran across the street to Rutherford, who was standing in front of his office, and requested protection. According to Ken Butler, Rutherford, who was a United States Marshal, among his other professions, called out to Willis and demanded peace. But before Rutherford could finish his sentence, Willis fired a shot at Riddle with his revolver. The bullet struck Riddle in the head and he fell to Rutherford's feet. George Herring, however, says that Jesse Hill was standing inside Rutherford's office and witnessed Sam McFarland fire the first shots. Though Herring does say that Sam's firing was wild and only intended to taunt the Brooks'. Herring says that Sam's firing scared Riddle and it was at this time that he turned around and fled to Rutherford.

No matter which version is true, after hitting George Riddle in the head, Willis "wasted precious time" by running up to him and shooting him twice more. Someone, possibly Rutherford, then fired on Willis and struck him in his right hip. Willis jumped up into the air and then fell face down into the mud. He got back up a moment later and began firing, but was then hit in the chest and killed. Clifton Brooks was struck multiple times; once in the leg, once in the neck, and once more in the chest, but he was able to survive the initial volley and make a run for it. Alonzo Riddle and Jim McFarland then chased him down on horseback and killed him. John Brooks was shot "through and through" and found lying near the back door of the post office, having been struck by a steel-jacketed bullet. Immediately after the shooting ceased, Rutherford arrested Jim, Joe, and Alonzo and then delivered them to Deputy Marshal Grant Johnson in Eufaula by wagon. The three men were placed in the Eufaula Jail and went before the county commissioner's court two days later on September 24. All three were charged with murder and released on bonds to await trial. John Brooks was also charged with murder, but he remained in Spokogee because of his critical condition. The town doctor expected John to die of blood poisoning, but he survived and lived into the 1950s. Willis and Clifton were buried in Checotah next to Thomas Brooks, who died in 1896.

Death of Jim McFarland

Less than three weeks after the gunfight at Spokogee, Jim McFarland was killed in an ambush. On October 10, 1902, Jim and his wife were returning home from Weleetka in their horse-drawn buggy, and as they approached a river ford near Old Watsonville, someone opened fire on them with a rifle. One steel-jacketed bullet struck Jim in the back and he died a few minutes later. According to Ken Butler, the first newspaper account of the incident says that Henry "Peg Leg" Brooks killed Jim near Weleetka, although this was later proven to be false. Henry and Sam Baker were the prime suspects, but there was no evidence and neither of them were arrested. Some local citizens believed that McFarland was killed by a member of his own faction, but in any event, nobody was ever charged for the crime. According to Edward Herring: "Most believed he had gotten what he deserved."

== Aftermath ==
The death of Jim McFarland marked the end of the feud, although some newspaper accounts say that Henry Brooks was killed shortly after. Henry, however, lived until 1920. In 1905, Henry was arrested for stealing horses again and sentenced to ten years in Fort Leavenworth, Kansas. When he was paroled on January 10, 1911, Henry went home to Lawrence County, Alabama, where he took care of his aging mother and became a bootlegger. On January 11, 1920, Henry was surrounded at his still by a posse under the command of Sheriff John Robinson. Though he was completely outnumbered, Henry chose to resist and began firing his revolver. The posse then retaliated and struck Henry twelve times. He died about fifteen minutes later.

Sam Baker also died violently. In 1911, Sam became involved in a dispute with a Checotah merchant, who shot him in the back one day. Old "Jenny" Brooks outlived all of her sons. She died on March 29, 1924, at the age of ninety-eight, and is said to have been proud that all of her sons had "died like men, with their boots on." As for the McFarland faction; all of those arrested were later acquitted and they continued living in the area.

The Fort Smith and Western Railway tracks finally reached Spokogee on April 1, 1903, and soon after the town was renamed Dustin.

== See also ==
- List of feuds in the United States
