= Operator (2015 film) =

- Film poster
- Directed by: Amariah Olson; Obin Olson
- Written by: Dwain Worrell; Anthony Feole
- Story by: Dwain Worrell; Amariah Olson; Obin Olson
- Produced by: Patrick Durham; Jonathan Sachar; Timothy Woodward Jr.
- Starring: Luke Goss; Mischa Barton; Michael Paré; Ving Rhames
- Cinematography: Amariah Olson; Obin Olson
- Music by: George Kallis
- Release dates: August 13, 2015 (Kuwait); November 3, 2015 (United States)
- Running time: 88 minutes
- Country: United States
- Language: English

Operator is a 2015 American action thriller drama film directed by Amariah Olson and Obin Olson and starring Luke Goss, Mischa Barton, Michael Paré and Ving Rhames.

== Cast ==
- Ving Rhames as Richard
- Luke Goss as Jeremy Miller
- Mischa Barton as Pamela Miller
- Michael Paré as Howard
- Tony Demil as Tony
- Riley Bundick as Cassie
- Maurice Chevalier as Officer Espinosa
- Walter Hendrix III as Officer Stanton
- Wendell Kinney as Officer Williams

== Plot ==
Pamela Miller (Pam) is a married lady who lives separated from her husband Jeremy Miller, who is a city police officer. Pam works as a call center operator for 911 emergencies. They together have a daughter, Cassie, whose custody is with Pam for the time being, till they are officially divorced. One day, a notorious criminal, Richard (Ving Rhames), kidnaps Cassie and calls 911 only to connect with Pam, whom he wants to send her estranged husband, Jeremy, to certain locations, where he can be killed. Richard doesn't allow Pam to hang up the call and answer other incoming emergency calls, leading to a physical conflict with an office coworker. Jeremy and his partner are able to figure out that someone is playing with them, after meeting a series of mishaps and accidents, and also receiving a text message from Pam, indicating that Cassie was kidnapped.

In the end, Jeremy is able to save Cassie and eliminate Richard.
