= Hyperfutura =

- Film poster
- Directed by: James O'Brien
- Written by: James O'Brien
- Produced by: Eric Kopatz & James O'Brien
- Starring: Eric Kopatz; Karen Corona; Gregory Kiem; Brando McClure
- Cinematography: Ama MacDonald
- Edited by: Ron Soha & Brando McClure
- Music by: Jesse Bilson
- Production company: Coldwater Bluemoon
- Distributed by: PanGlobal Entertainment
- Release date: July 2012
- Language: English

Hyperfutura is a 2012 science fiction film from American filmmaker James O'Brien, starring Eric Kopatz, Karen Corona, Gregory Kiem, Scott Donovan, Celine Brigitte, Alysse Cobb, Lionel Heredia, Gary Kohn, Edward Romero and William Moore. It draws elements from the mashup video movement, Ed Wood, time travel and transhumanism, and pays homage to such counterculture works as The Church of the SubGenius and the fictional experimental filmmaker James Orin Incandenza from the David Foster Wallace novel Infinite Jest. Utilizing both stock footage and a live action narrative, it takes the viewer on a psychedelic voyage into the subconscious of a hybrid robot human sent back in time.

The film is based on the epic poem "Hyperfutura" by Eric Kopatz. The screenplay is by James O'Brien. The film was edited by Brando McClure and Ron Soha, with cinematography by Ama MacDonald, visual effects by John Younger and sound design by Jesse Bilson. It has been compared to Spectres of the Spectrum by experimental filmmaker Craig Baldwin, Eraserhead by David Lynch and the cinema of Andy Warhol.

Hyperfutura premiered in Santa Monica, California, in July 2012 at the video store Vidiots. It was released by PanGlobal Entertainment worldwide in 2013.

== Production ==
The film was shot in 10 days in the Southern California locations of Venice, Long Beach, Reseda and Malibu.

The lighting design and shooting technique of cinematographer Ama MacDonald was highlighted by tech magazine P3 Update in the article "Hyperfutura in High Definition."

== Reception ==
Chris Garcia, the museum culture and art work specialist behind the visual arts podcast, Three Minute Modernist and the film journal Klaus at Gunpoint, selected the film for review in the series "52 Episodes to Science Fiction Film Literacy," linking it to the works of artist Bruce Conner and the Stanley Kubrick epic 2001: A Space Odyssey, in the episode entitled: "Hyperfutura: Avant-Garde or Really Messed Up?"

Hyperfutura was a favorite of Chinese film critic JJ Doodle Sheep who reviewed the film, known as Utopia Black Hole in China. Sheep made a number of telling connections to the material in his review titled: "Adam is a Smart Robot."

Cult film historian Fraser Sherman found it "pretentiously clever" and compared it to the Bar Mitzvah film in The Apprenticeship of Duddy Kravitz.

Despite its microbudget garage cinema approach, the film made the Top 50 Independent Video Rentals in iTunes.

It is also featured in The Big List of Time Travel Adventures and in Kenneth Krabat's list All Time Travel Movies 1896 And On.
