= The Night They Came Home (film) =

2024 film by NAME

- Release poster
- Directed by: Paul G. Volk
- Written by: John A. Russo; James O'Brien
- Produced by: Ryan D. Adams; Patrick Durham; Larry Layfield; John A. Russo
- Starring: Brian Austin Green; Robert Carradine; Charlie Townsend; Tim Abell; Kelsey Reinhardt; Danny Trejo
- Cinematography: Morgan Schmidt
- Edited by: Ron Cabreros
- Music by: Rahm Khatz
- Production companies: Four Horsemen Films; Spiral Cabin Productions
- Distributed by: Lionsgate Home Entertainment
- Release date: January 12, 2024
- Running time: 105 minutes
- Country: United States
- Language: English

The Night They Came Home is a 2024 American Western thriller film, directed by Paul G. Volk and written by John A. Russo and James O'Brien. It stars Brian Austin Green, Robert Carradine, Charlie Townsend, Tim Abell, Kelsey Reinhardt, and Danny Trejo.

The film was released by Lionsgate Home Entertainment on January 12, 2024.

== Premise ==
In the Old West at the end of the 1800s, a US Marshal partners with Native Americans to hunt down the Rufus Buck Gang in the Indian Territory.

== Cast ==
- Charlie Townsend as Rufus Buck
- Danny Trejo as Digger
- Robert Carradine as Bart
- Weston Cage as Bob
- Brian Austin Green as Chuck Palmer
- Tim Abell as Heck Thomas
- Peter Sherayko as George Maledon
- Kelsey Reinhardt as Jolene Palmer

== Production ==
In December 2023, it was announced that a Western thriller titled The Night They Came Home directed by Paul G. Volk and written by John A. Russo and James O'Brien was complete, and that Charlie Townsend, Danny Trejo, Robert Carradine, Weston Cage, Brian Austin Green, Tim Abell, Peter Sherayko, and Kelsey Reinhardt round out the ensemble cast.

== Release ==
The Night They Came Home was released by Lionsgate Home Entertainment on January 12, 2024.
