= The Call (2020 American film) =

2020 film by Timothy Woodward Jr.

- Theatrical release poster
- Directed by: Timothy Woodward Jr.
- Written by: Patrick Stibbs
- Produced by: Jeffrey Reddick; Patrick Stibbs; Zebulun Huling; Gina Rugolo; James Cullen Bressack; Randy J. Goodwin
- Starring: Lin Shaye; Tobin Bell; Chester Rushing
- Cinematography: Pablo Diez
- Edited by: Wayne J. Liu
- Music by: Samuel Joseph Smythe
- Production companies: Voltage Pictures; Appreciated Films; Status Media & Entertainment
- Distributed by: Cinedigm
- Release date: October 2, 2020
- Running time: 97 minutes
- Country: United States
- Language: English
- Box office: $1.6 million

The Call is a 2020 American horror film directed by Timothy Woodward Jr. and starring Lin Shaye, Tobin Bell, Erin Sanders, and Chester Rushing. The film was written by Patrick Stibbs.

== Premise ==
In the Fall of 1987, after the unexpected death of an elderly woman suspected to be a witch, a group of friends who tormented her are forced to call a phone installed in her casket. To their horror, someone on the other end picks up and shows them what Hell really looks like.

== Cast ==
- Lin Shaye as Edith Cranston
- Tobin Bell as Edward Cranston
- Chester Rushing as Chris
- Erin Sanders as Tonya
- Mike C. Manning as Zack
- Sloane Morgan Siegel as Brett
- Judd Lormand as Harliss

== Release ==
The film was released theatrically in the United States on October 2, 2020 and on VOD on October 30, 2020. It released on Blu-ray on December 15, 2020.

== Reception ==
On the review aggregator website Rotten Tomatoes, 46% of 24 critics' reviews are positive, with an average rating of 5.2/10. The website's consensus reads: "Some horror fans and '80s enthusiasts may answer The Call, although a lack of genuine scares and an overload of genre tropes will leave most struggling to maintain the connection."

Drew Tinnin of Dread Central awarded the film three stars out of five, and wrote, "homaging the 1980's is great but, at times, it feels more like a template because, in execution, The Call is really a much darker movie and stylistically moves into more J-Horror territory." On The Guardian, Leslie Felperin rated it 2 out of 5 stars writing that the film is "a fairly shonky assemblage of tired tropes, full of dropped connections and annoying static."
