= Venice Bound =

1995 film directed by James O'Brien

- Directed by: James O'Brien
- Written by: James O'Brien
- Produced by: Gary Kohn; James O'Brien; Devon Greene; Eric Kopatz
- Starring: Jackson Price; Gary Kohn; Eric Kopatz; Carl William Grant; Tara Steilen; Carol Dolan; Nina Ameri; Stephen Bruno
- Cinematography: Eric Swanson
- Edited by: Dave Greenberg
- Music by: Michael Sean Collins
- Release date: 1995
- Country: United States

Venice Bound is a 1995 indie film by American filmmaker James O'Brien. It details the lives of three mysterious, off-beat strangers who meet by chance in Venice Beach and agree to pull a robbery.

== Cast ==
- Jackson Price as Spoon
- Gary Douglas Kohn as Seb
- Eric Kopatz as Linus
- Carl William Grant as Frank
- Tara Steilen as Amy
- Carol Dolan as Lynn
- Nina Ameri as Susan
- Stephen Bruno as Jimmy

== Production ==
Robert Osborne of The Hollywood Reporter did a story on the making of the film for his Rambling Reporter column, comparing the film to Robert Rodriguez's El Mariachi. It was shot in color Fujifilm with a 16mm Eclair camera in Venice, California and downtown Los Angeles in March 1994.

== Release ==
Venice Bound premiered in 16mm at the Directors Guild of America in Hollywood in 1995 and then later in 35mm at the Orpheum in downtown LA. It made its international premiere at the 1995 Cannes Film Festival, where it was championed by Mark Cousins, film critic and curator of the Edinburgh Film Festival. Cousins selected it for official competition in the Rosebud category of his ’95 festival, opening the door to a European festival run, including official competition in such festivals as the Filmfest Hamburg, Leeds International Film Festival, the National Festival for Wales (later the Cardiff Film Festival) and Italy's Mystfest. Venice Bound was released theatrically in 1996–97, playing an extended run at the Aero Theatre in Santa Monica, and at the Laemmle Sunset 5 (now Sundance Sunset Cinemas). It also played on the east coast at the Cable Car Cinema in Providence, Rhode Island.

== Reception ==
Variety magazine called O’Brien a “talent in the raw” and said the film "keeps you glued to the screen.”
