= American Violence =

- Theatrical release poster
- Directed by: Timothy Woodward Jr.
- Written by: Al Lamanda
- Produced by: Jose Alvarado; Lauren De Normandie; Henry Penzi; Michael Long; Timothy Woodward Jr.
- Starring: Bruce Dern; Denise Richards; Kaiwi Lyman-Mersereau; Columbus Short; Johnny Messner; Emma Rigby; Rob Gronkowski; Stipe Miocic; Michael Paré
- Cinematography: Pablo Diez
- Edited by: Ned Thorne
- Music by: Andrew Joslyn
- Production companies: Status Media & Entertainment
- Distributed by: Cinedigm
- Release date: February 3, 2017
- Running time: 107 minutes
- Country: United States
- Language: English

American Violence is a 2017 American crime drama film directed and produced by Timothy Woodward Jr. and produced by Jose Alvarado, Lauren De Normandie, Henry Penzi and Michael Long. The film stars Bruce Dern, Denise Richards, Kaiwi Lyman-Mersereau, Columbus Short, Rob Gronkowski, and Michael Paré.

With a running time of 107 minutes, it was released in a limited theatrical engagement as well as on video-on-demand by Cinedigm on February 3, 2017.

== Premise ==
Fascinated by the root causes of violent behavior, globally renowned psychologist Dr. Amanda Tyler has an opportunity to interview and analyze death row inmate Jackson Shea. As the interview commences with Jackson's fate hanging in the balance, Amanda must determine whether or not a stay of execution should be granted.

== Cast ==
- Bruce Dern as Richard Morton
- Denise Richards as Amanda Tyler
- Kaiwi Lyman-Mersereau as Jackson Shea
- Columbus Short as Ben Woods
- Rob Gronkowski as Brad
- Michael Paré as Martin Bigg
- Johnny Messner as Paul
- Nick Chinlund as Belmonte
- Patrick Kilpatrick as Charlie Rose
- Michele Santopietro as Cynthia Shea
- Stipe Miocic as Hal
- Emma Rigby as Olivia Rose
- Michael John Long as Riggs
- Willow Hale as Beatrice

== Release ==
The film was released in the U.S. on February 3, 2017.
