= Timothy Woodward Jr. =

American actor and director

- Born: Timothy Woodward Jr. Georgetown, South Carolina, USA
- Occupations: Film director, TV and film actor and producer
- Years active: 2004–present

Timothy Woodward Jr. is an American film and TV director, actor and producer.

== Life ==
Woodward was born in Georgetown, South Carolina in 1983. He began his career as actor in various series and films.

A prolific filmmaker, Woodward, for example, directed 13 films between 2013 and 2017. They include the biographical Western Hickok and the period drama Gangster Land. In a review of that film, Variety described him as follows:

Timothy Woodward Jr. was born too late. Clearly, the kind of enterprise that enabled this actor-turned-director to make no less than 13 features in the last five years for his own production company would’ve been ideally deployed in a “golden age” Poverty Row studio.

In 2018 Woodward, "who until (then) ha(d) primarily worked in the action and Western genres" directed his first horror film, The Final Wish. He made another horror film in 2020, The Call, and in 2023, Til Death Do Us Part, a thriller and Woodward's third collaboration with Jeffrey Reddick.

Woodward has also overseen the Amazon Prime series Studio City since 2019. This series, created by Sean Keanan, is directed, co-written and produced by Woodward and has received various Indie Series award and Emmy nominations, including "Outstanding directing team" for Woodward, and two wins, including the Daytime Emmy for Outstanding Limited Series in 2021.

As of 2025, Woodward's upcoming projects include Foster, starring James Franco, Ron Perlman, Natalie Burn and Wesley River.

== Filmography ==
=== As actor ===
- 2004 - Summer Dreams, teen drama series filmed with local actors in Wilmington
- 2005 - Palmetto Pointe, TV series : main character;
- 2008 - Whitakker Bay, TV series, filmed in Wilmington
- 2009 -Redefining Love
- 2010 - Hollywood East. TV series
- 2010 - Butchered
- 2012- Blackout, horror film

=== As director ===
- 2013 - 7 Faces of Jack the Reaper (also actor); co-directed with John Kearns Jr.
- 2013 - Finders Keepers: The Root of All Evil (also actor)
- 2014 - Beyond Justice (aka Throwdown) (also actor); co-directed with Wes Miller
- 2015 - Gnome Alone, horror film not to be confused with the 2017 animation film of the same name
- 2015 - SWAT: Unit 887 (aka 24 Hours), (also actor)
- 2015 - The Good, the Bad, and the Dead (aka 4Got10)
- 2015 - Checkmate
- 2016 - WEAPONiZED
- 2016 - Traded
- 2016 - Decommissioned
- 2017 - American Violence
- 2017 - Hickok
- 2017 - Gangster Land
- 2018 - Silencer
- 2018 - The Final Wish
- 2019 - The Outsider
- Since 2019: Studio City, Amazon Prime series, also as producer and writer
- 2020 - The Call
- 2023 - Til Death Do Us Part

=== As producer only ===
- 2015 - Operator
- 2017 - The Shadow Effect

== Honours ==
=== Nominations ===
- 2020: 47th Daytime Creative Arts Emmy Awards
  - Outstanding directing team for Studio City
- 11th Annual Indie Series Awards
  - Best Directing for Studio City
- 13th Annual Indie Series Awards
  - Best Writing for Studio City
  - Best Directing for Studio City

=== Awards ===
- 2010: Telly Awards - Bronze award for his role in Hollywood East
- 2021: 48th Daytime Creative Arts Emmy Awards, Chairman's Award
- 2021 : LA Live Festival: Best Director for Studio City
