= Rick Mora =

American model and actor (born 1975)

Rick Mora (born January 22, 1975) is an American model and actor.

He claims Apache and Yaqui descent.

== Filmography ==
- Turok: Son of Stone (2008)
- "I Need You Now" video (song sung by Agnes) (2009)
- The Dead and the Damned (2010)
- Big Money Rustlas (2010)
- Yellow Rock (2011)
- Avenged (2013)
