= Camille Montgomery =

American actress (born in San Francisco)

- Born: San Francisco, California
- Occupation: Actress
- Years active: 2010–present
- Website: Website Camille Montgomery

Camille Montgomery (born 20th century in San Francisco) is an American actress in film and television.

== Life and career ==
Montgomery was born the daughter of a jazz guitarist. She took her first acting lessons at the age of nine and was seen at the Young Performer's Theater at a young age. During high school and college she attended the Community Theater and then studied at the British American Drama Academy with a B.A. in theater arts performance. After studying at Oxford University, she moved to Los Angeles and has been active in film and television ever since.

After a few roles in short films, she played her first female lead in the independent film The Dead and the Damned in 2010, directed by Rene Perez. This was followed by appearances in Giordany Orellana's horror film The Grotto in 2014, in Bennie Woodell's drama Love Meet Hope in 2016 and in David Del Rios horror film Sick for Toys in 2018. In 2020 she was cast in the role of Carole Lombard in the multi-Oscar-nominated film drama Mank, which was produced and directed for Netflix by David Fincher.

In addition to her work in film, she also works as an actress for television. In 2022 she starred in an ensemble cast with Kathleen Robertson, Donald Sutherland, Thomas Dekker, Finn Jones and Diane Kruger in an episode of the drama series Swimming with Sharks.

== Selected filmography ==
=== Films ===
- 2010: The Dead and the Damned
- 2014: The Grotto
- 2015: And the Past Recedes
- 2016: Love Meet Hope
- 2018: Sick for Toys
- 2018: Heaven
- 2019: American Dreams
- 2020: As Long As I'm Famous
- 2020: Mank
- 2021: Before I'm Dead

=== Television ===
- 2016: Sweet/Vicious (TV-Series, 1 Episode)
- 2017: Hey You, It's Me (TV-Series, 1 Episode)
- 2022: Swimming with Sharks (TV-Series, 1 Episode)

=== Short films ===
- 2014: The Lines in Their Faces
- 2015: Blank Pages
- 2016: Möbius
- 2019: The Blackbird Interviews
- 2020: Pieces of Me
- 2021: Unprecedented Times
