= The Outsider (2019 film) =

2019 American Western film

- Film poster
- Directed by: Timothy Woodward Jr.
- Written by: Sean Ryan
- Produced by: Johnny Cleveland
- Starring: Jon Foo; Trace Adkins; Sean Patrick Flanery; Danny Trejo
- Cinematography: Pablo Diez
- Edited by: Colleen Halsey; Morgan Halsey; Richard Halsey
- Music by: Samuel Joseph Smythe
- Release date: June 14, 2019
- Running time: 86 minutes
- Country: United States
- Language: English

The Outsider is a 2019 American Western film directed by Timothy Woodward Jr. and starring Trace Adkins, Jon Foo, Sean Patrick Flanery, Kaiwi Lyman-Mersereau and Danny Trejo.

== Cast ==
- Jon Foo as Jing Phang
- Trace Adkins as Marshal Walker
- Sean Patrick Flanery as Chris King
- Kaiwi Lyman-Mersereau as James Walker
- Danny Trejo as Carlos

== Reception ==
The film has a 50% rating on Rotten Tomatoes, based on 18 reviews with an average rating of 5.2/10. The website's critics consensus reads: "The Outsider may satisfy Western fans, but despite a winning performance from Country music legend Trace Adkins it's too predictable to really leave a mark."
