= Inge Rademeyer =

American actress

Inge Rademeyer is an actress and filmmaker. Born in South Africa she immigrated to New Zealand at 15. After majoring in Film, TV and Media Studies as well as Theatre and Drama at the University of Auckland, Rademeyer moved to Wellington to pursue working in the growing New Zealand film industry. She worked at Academy-Award winning VFX house Weta Digital on projects such as King Kong, Avatar and The Hobbit. During this time she also produced and starred in a critically acclaimed independent feature film Good for Nothing with her partner - writer director Mike Wallis - also Weta Digital alumni. During post-production Oscar-winner Jamie Selkirk came on board as an Executive Producer and investor in the film

== Life and career ==
Rademeyer was born in Johannesburg, South Africa. She immigrated to New Zealand with her family when she was 15. She was a member of the contemporary dance company Black Grace’s UYM for 4 years. She graduated from the University of Auckland with a degree in film and drama and having been awarded a scholarship for flair in comedy acting (Charlotte Emily Lubeck Scholarship). After university she met fiancé Mike Wallis and subsequently moved to Wellington to join him in working at Peter Jackson’s VFX company Weta Digital. After attempts at purchasing a house they both realized that they “didn’t want to buy a house” and just “wanted to make movies”. They then started making Good for Nothing with the support of many film industry friends, family and local farmers where they shot on location in both the South Island and North Island of New Zealand.

Good for Nothing had its world premiere at the Santa Barbara International Film Festival to positive reviews and sell out screenings. Rademeyer and Wallis sold the film to a US distributor and following the theatrical release in the US Rademeyer was labeled a “lovely newcomer” by The Hollywood Reporter and “intriguingly beautiful” by Variety amongst other positive reviews for the film including Leonard Maltin, The New York Times and Ain’t It Cool News.

Leonard Maltin subsequently included Good for Nothing and Mike Wallis in The New York Times bestseller book Leonard Maltin's Movie Guide (2013 edition) as one of the “Fifty Notable Debut Features of the Past Twenty Years”.

Following the New Zealand release Good for Nothing the film received 7 nominations at the New Zealand Film Awards 2012 including Best Picture and a Best Actress nomination for Rademeyer.

Rademeyer has also appeared in Weta Workshop and Greg Broadmore’s Dr Grordborts universe as Leila Phantom in photos, video and the cover of a book. Her fans created Phantom Facts.

Her sister Ula Rademeyer is a VFX artist at Weta Digital.

== Filmography ==
Year	Title	Role	Notes
2011	Good for Nothing	Isabella Montgomery	Nominated – New Zealand Film Awards Best Actress; Also Producer; Premiered at the Santa Barbara International Film Festival 2011
2013	Ancestral	Abby	Short film by Christian Rivers
2008	Escamotage	Lead	Short
2008	Silence, Pain and Fury	Lead	Short
2007	Dr Grordborts Infallible Aether Oscillators	Lead	Short film by Weta Workshop
