= Hickok (film) =

2017 film

- Theatrical release poster
- Directed by: Timothy Woodward Jr.
- Written by: Michael Lanahan
- Produced by: Lauren De Normandie; Christopher Brian Nicoletti; Henry Penzi; Timothy Woodward Jr.
- Starring: Luke Hemsworth; Trace Adkins; Kris Kristofferson; Bruce Dern
- Cinematography: Pablo Diez
- Edited by: Ned Thorne
- Music by: Andrew Joslyn
- Production companies: Status Media & Entertainment; Avery Productions; Vision Tree
- Distributed by: Cinedigm
- Release date: July 7, 2017
- Running time: 88 minutes
- Country: United States
- Language: English

Hickok is a 2017 American Western film directed by Timothy Woodward Jr., starring Luke Hemsworth, Trace Adkins, Kris Kristofferson and Bruce Dern. It was released in a limited theatrical engagement as well as on video-on-demand by Cinedigm on July 7, 2017.

== Plot ==
Wild Bill Hickok, (Luke Hemsworth) an infamous lawman and gunslinger, is assigned with taming the 'wildest cow town in the west'. His reputation for his style of frontier justice is then put to the ultimate test.

== Cast ==
- Luke Hemsworth as James "Wild Bill" Hickok
- Trace Adkins as Phil Coe
- Kris Kristofferson as George Knox
- Bruce Dern as Doc Rivers O'Roark
- Cameron Richardson as Mattie
- Kaiwi Lyman-Mersereau as John Wesley Hardin / "Arkansaw"
- Hunter Fischer as Joey
- Jason Lively as Ike
- Olajide Olatunji as Raleigh
- Robert Catrini as Sheriff Akers
- Britain Simons as The Kid
- Kimberly Alexander as Lou-Ann
- Shane P. Allen as Horse Rider
- Terral Altom as The Stranger

== Reception ==
The film holds a 50% approval rating on Rotten Tomatoes, based on 8 reviews, and an average rating of 5.5/10.

In The Hollywood Reporter, Frank Scheck wrote:

Hemsworth, forgoing the long locks and mustache normally associated with his real-life character, invests his portrayal with doses of entertaining humor. He receives solid support from the veteran cast: Kristofferson exudes effortless gravitas; Adkins, who’s made acting in Westerns a steady side gig from his country music career, uses his endlessly deep voice to effectively menacing effect; and Dern (who’s apparently been unable to achieve significant career momentum from his Oscar-nominated turn in Nebraska) amusingly provides the effect of a modern-day Walter Brennan.
