= Kaiwi Lyman-Mersereau =

American actor

- Born: May 13, 1983 (age 43); Honolulu, Hawaii, U.S.
- Occupation: Actor
- Years active: 2003–present

Kaiwi Lyman-Mersereau (born May 13, 1983), or simple Kaiwi Lyman, is an American actor from Honolulu, Hawaii. He is known for his co-starring roles in Den of Thieves, American Violence and Hickok.

== Filmography ==
=== Films ===
Year	Title	Role
2005	Breaking Vegas (TV Series documentary)	Norman Packard
2005	Frankenstein vs. the Creature from Blood Cove	Surfer 2
2006	Trespassers	Colin
2006	A Little Light (Short Film)	Mike (as Kaiwi Lyman)
2006	Untold Stories of the ER (TV Series documentary)	Kyle Jeeter
2008	Douchebag Beach: A Love Story (TV Series short)	Kai (2008) (as Kaiwi Lyman)
2008	Mind of Mencia (TV Series)	Kurt Cobain
2008	CSI: Miami (TV Series)	Crypt King
2008	The Dark Path Chronicles (TV Series)	Biker
2009	Outpost (Short)	Jake Preston (as Kaiwi Lyman)
2010	Twentysixmiles (TV Series)	Surfer 2
2010	Mega Shark vs. Crocosaurus	USS Argonaut Officer (as Kaiwi Lyman)
2011	Mega Python vs. Gatoroid	Tom
2011	The Young and the Restless (TV Series)	Chester
2011	Born Bad	Frankie
2012	Hawaii Five-0	Kevin Creed
2014	Android Cop	Wescott
2015	Circle	Bearded man
2015	Jane the Virgin (TV Series)	Zed
2016	Fresh Off the Boat (TV Series)	White Guy
2016	Ice Sharks	Michael
2016	Grace and Frankie (TV Series)	Skipper
2016	Traded	Jed
2016	The Amityville Terror	(as Kaiwi Lyman)
2016	Animal Kingdom	Sett (Surfer)
2016	Ray Donovan (TV Series)	Photographer
2016	Westworld (TV Series)	Branding Soldier
2017	American Violence	Jackson Shea
2017	Flaked (TV Series)	Scott
2017	American Horror Story: Cult (TV Series)	Gutterball
2017	Hickok	John Wesley Hardin
2018	Den of Thieves	Tony Z Zapata
2018	The Final Wish	Derek
2019	The Outsider	James Walker
2020	Juicy Girl (Short Film)	Michael Johnstone
2021	Copshop	Barnes
2023	Sympathy for the Devil	
2024	Trigger Warning	Ghost
TBA	Empire City	TBA
