= Western Religion (film) =

2015 film

- Screen Media poster
- Directed by: James O'Brien
- Written by: James O'Brien
- Produced by: Louie Sabatasso; James O'Brien
- Starring: Claude Duhamel; Louie Sabatasso; Miles Szanto; Gary Douglas Kohn; Holiday Hadley; Sean Joyce; William Moore; James Anthony Cotton; Sam Bearpaw; Melissa Strom; Peter Sherayko; Tony Herbert; Merik Tadros; Scott Donovan; Peter Shinkoda
- Cinematography: Morgan Schmidt
- Edited by: Kenny Lee Dodson
- Music by: Ram Khatabakhsh
- Production company: 3rd Partner Productions
- Distributed by: Screen Media Films
- Release date: May 16, 2015 (Cannes Film Festival)
- Running time: 105 minutes
- Country: United States
- Language: English
- Budget: $250,000

Western Religion is 2015 Western film directed and written by James O'Brien and starring Claude Duhamel, Peter Shinkoda, and Miles Szanto, among many others in a large international cast.

== Plot ==
In Religion, Arizona, gunfighters from the far reaches of the globe come to compete in a poker tournament where their very souls are on the line.

The film opens in Arizona Territory in the year 1879 with a number of scenes that intermingle to provide glimpses of a handful of the main characters and their backgrounds— Saint John (Gary Douglas Kohn) who is hanging from a noose like a dead man yet still very much alive; the gunslinger Anton Stice (Claude Duhamel) who kills four men over an insult; Chinaman Dan (Peter Shinkoda), a wanted bank robber; and the multifaceted dandy Salt Peter (Louie Sabatasso), a cardsharp looking for the next big game, in this case the tournament in the dusty tent city of Religion.

Town entrepreneur Harvard Gold (James Anthony Cotton) hosts the “first annual” poker game to drum up business for himself and put Religion on the map. On hand is New York Times reporter Edward James (Tony Herbert). The game is held at the Last Chance Saloon, owned by Southern Bill (Peter Sherayko, Tombstone). As the date approaches, dozens of gold seekers – including a “half injun” named Waylin Smith (Miles Szanto) and his Apache guide (Sam Bearpaw), magician Raven McCabe (William Moore) and carpenter Bobby Shea (Sean Joyce) – arrive, imbibing Bill’s hospitality of “beds, booze and broads” when not playing cards. The madam of Bill’s house is Bootstrap Bess (Holiday Hadley), who has fashioned her own design for the tournament prize, which is a large ornate cross made of pure gold.

The tournament begins and tempers flare. Stice cozies up one by one to his fellow players, offering them the gold cross as if it is his to give. Only with Saint John, a reformed outlaw turned itinerant preacher, does Anton take a different tack, reminding John that the time is coming when they will have dealings once more...when he will offer John a chance to regain what he once lost in his shadowy past.

== Cast ==
- Claude Duhamel as Anton Stice
- Peter Shinkoda as Chinaman Dan
- Miles Szanto as Waylin Smith
- Louie Sabatasso Salt Peter
- James Anthony Cotton as Harvard Gold
- Gary Douglas Kohn as Saint John
- Holiday Hadley as Bootstrap Bess
- Sean Joyce as Bobby Shea
- Merik Tadros as Prince Zain Mohammed
- William Moore as Raven McCabe
- Peter Sherayko as Southern Bill
- Sam Bearpaw as Ironwolf
- Melissa Strom as Roberta Gold
- Scott Donovan as Marshal Stone
- Tony Herbert as Edward James

== Production ==
To overcome the U.S. government shutdown of all national parks just weeks before their scheduled shoot at Paramount Ranch, O'Brien and his producing partner Louie Sabatasso of 3rd Partner Productions enlisted the aid of Peter Sherayko, whose prop company built tent city in the mountains of Agua Dulce, California.

The independent film was completed on schedule and within budget, despite hurricane winds destroying the sets and the coordination of a massive international cast in the remote territory of Agua Dulce.

O’Brien engaged London-based composer Ram Khatabakhsh to create the original score.

== Release ==
Western Religion had its world premiere at the 2015 Cannes Film Market. Automatic Entertainment signed with the film for worldwide sales, beginning at the Cannes Film Market. The film was bought by Screen Media Films for North America following its world premiere. It was released theatrically in the fall of 2015 and in home entertainment in early 2016.

Western Religion was one of 15 films in competition at the 2015 San Diego Film Festival and began its US theatrical release at the Arena Cinema in Hollywood October 9–15, 2015.

The film embarked on a 'Wagon Trail' national tour. Its first stop after Los Angeles took place at the historic New Strand Theatre in West Liberty, Iowa. Western Religion had its Midwest premiere at the New Strand on November 20, 2015. There were horses, cowboys and Indians on hand for the premiere, with TV coverage by NBC Universal, ENT1 Las Vegas and PATV18 out of Iowa City. The film ran theatrically at the New Strand until November 25.

The next stop on the Wagon Trail national tour was the Alamo Drafthouse in Austin, Texas, at Slaughter Lane on December 3, 2015, followed by a premiere at Landmark's Sunshine Cinema in the East Village of New York City on January 11, 2016. Western Religion completed its national tour at Narberth Reel Cinemas 2 in Pennsylvania at a sold out show that broke the house record, while playing alongside Star Wars: The Force Awakens.

Screen Media Films released the film on video on Demand on January 1, 2016, and slated the DVD release for March 1, 2016.

== Reception ==
Martin Tsai of the Los Angeles Times described it as "a one-dimensional movie painted in painfully broad strokes and whizzing, hurry-scurry action sequences". Nick Schager of The Village Voice called it "a fiasco of frontier-wide proportions". Denise Marie Siino of Life in LA Magazine wrote, "Not since John Ford’s 3 Godfathers has a Western film taken a Biblical myth and, along with a host of plot twists and a cadre of colorful characters, successfully reincarnated it for the box office." Alicia Glass of MovieMoxie gave it seven out of 10 stars and called it "a rollicking good time... that has a little bit of everything and then some." The West Liberty Index wrote that although the film doesn't have "the finish of a big Hollywood production... it is definitely unique, with the soul of a spaghetti western. The Biblical play on good and evil is like a children's fable, albeit the engaging film is aimed at adults."
