= Traded (film) =

- Directed by: Timothy Woodward Jr.
- Written by: Mark Esslinger
- Produced by: Jose Alvarado; Lauren De Normandie; Craigar Grosvenor; Michael J. Long; Timothy Woodward Jr.
- Starring: Kris Kristofferson; Trace Adkins; Michael Paré
- Cinematography: Pablo Diez
- Edited by: Ned Thorne
- Music by: Samuel Joseph Smythe
- Production companies: Status Media & Entertainment; Puppy Entertainment
- Distributed by: Cinedigm
- Release date: June 10, 2016
- Running time: 98 minutes
- Country: United States
- Language: English

Traded is a 2016 American Western film directed by Timothy Woodward Jr. and starring Kris Kristofferson, Trace Adkins and Michael Paré.

== Plot ==
The film opens with the narrator stating that women have little value in the West and many become prostitutes. Women are sold and traded like property in Kansas.

In a western cabin 17 year daughter, Lily, asks Dad, Clay, if she can go to the "tie dance" and he says no despite Mom's support. Son, Jake, is sent outside to fetch some honey and is fatally bitten by a rattlesnake. After the funeral and the passage of time, the family is dysfunctional. The mother is in a deep depression and the daughter runs off to become a Harvey girl. Clay, a former gunslinger, follows with guns in hand to rescue his girl.

Clay shows his daughter's picture to anyone who will look. He breaks the nose of the stagecoach ticket man for lying to him. Daughter, Lily has befriended a man named Rig Marlowe who sells her to become a prostitute. Clay Travis first goes to Wichita to find the Harvey Girl tryouts. No one has seen Lily. Billy the bartender tells Clay to find Rig. Billy also has some sage advice: There is a battle in every man between evil and anger or love and hope. The winner of the two extremes is decided by which side the man feeds.

Clay goes to the Rusty Spur to join a card game with Rig Marlowe, Silas and Charlie. Rig has been caught cheating and Silas shoots him dead. With the Marlowe lead lost, Clay moves on to the Spinning Wheel Saloon run by Ty Stover. Ty denies seeing Lily and after checking with Ty's whores, the Piano Girl says she's seen her, but can't remember where. Clay and the bouncer have a big fist fight. Clay goes upstairs to find Ty gone. Clay returns to the bouncer where Bartender Billy ends the fight with a gunshot and lets Clay leave. Dad moves on to find Ty at the local firehouse. He learns Ty sold Lily to a man named Lavoie for a new fire bell. Dad leaves Ty hanging by a noose and leaves for Dodge City to find Lavoie. Before leaving, he kills another man from his past in a shoot-out.

Getting off the train in Dodge City, he meets a woman who is so ugly her name is only "Girl". She is a slave to Cavendish, her step-dad, who in turn has captured Clay. Clay is chained to his chair but the next morning he kills the step-dad and sets "Girl" free. An old girlfriend and prostitute, Nell, gives Clay a tip on Lavoie who has just taken over the French Chateau whorehouse.

At French Chateau Levoie tells his son Kipp and gangster Jeb how important family is to life. A couple of whores come in to Levoie's office to demand some working conditions. His response is to shoot the first whore dead and to send the remaining girl back to tell the rest of the woman that the dead woman's " snatch went dry and she had to leave town". Clay comes looking for his daughter Lily and tries to escape with her. The "Girl" helps Lily but Clay is captured.

Back home Mom is writing a note and then heads to the barn carrying a rope. Girl takes Lily to safety back at her house.

Levoie and his henchmen torture Clay for killing his brother in Wichita. Once again when left alone Clay outsmarts his captor and escapes. Clay goes looking for Lily at Girl's house, but Levoie's men have beaten him there and he finds Girl dead having been shot by one of Levoie's men, but no sign of Lily. A shootout then occurs and Billy the Bartender comes to his rescue. Clay returns to French Chateau to find his daughter, where he kills Levoie.

Clay and Lily finally escape and head for home. Clay finds a note from Mom and assumes suicide. Lily rushes over to the barn. Lily then spots Mom bringing a horse to the barn and the family is united again.

== Cast ==
- Michael Paré as Clay Travis
- Trace Adkins as Ty Stover
- Tom Sizemore as Lew Crawford / Lavoie
- Kris Kristofferson as Billy
- Brittany Elizabeth Williams as Lily Travis
- Constance Brenneman as Amelia Travis
- Hunter Fischer as Jake Travis
- Marie Oldenbourg as Girl
- Martin Kove as Cavendish, Girl's Step Dad
- Natalia Cigliuti as Nell Craft
- Joshua LeBar as "Rig" Marlowe
- Quinton Aaron as Silas
- John Ryan McLaughlin as Charlie
- Michael J. Long as Kipp
- Kaiwi Lyman-Mersereau as Jed (credited as "Kaiwi Lyman")
- Kelly Kristofferson as Claire
- Tom "Snake Dancer" Troutman as Cowboy In Bar

== Reception ==
The film has a 40% rating on Rotten Tomatoes, based on 5 critics.
