= The Dead and the Damned =

- Film poster
- Directed by: Rene Perez
- Written by: Rene Perez; Barry Massoni
- Produced by: Mattia Borrani
- Starring: David Lockhart; Camille Montgomery; Rick Mora; Robert Amstler
- Cinematography: Paul Nordin
- Edited by: Rene Perez
- Music by: Mattia Borrani; Rene Perez
- Production company: Mattia Borrani Productions
- Release date: July 17, 2010 (Another Hole In the Head Film Festival)
- Running time: 85 minutes
- Country: United States
- Language: English

The Dead and the Damned (also known as Cowboys & Zombies) is a 2010 American horror Western film directed by Rene Perez, written by Perez and Barry Massoni, and starring David Lockhart, Camille Montgomery, Rick Mora, and Robert Amstler. The film depicts a meteorite that unleashes a zombie virus in the American Old West.

== Plot ==
During the California Gold Rush in the 1840s, Mortimer receives a bounty for Brother Wolf, a Native American accused of rape. Mortimer recruits a prostitute, Rhiannon, as bait to lure Wolf out. However, Mortimer becomes dubious of the charges once he meets Wolf. Meanwhile, a group of prospectors unleashes a zombie virus when they attempt to mine a meteorite. Mortimer, Rhiannon, and Wolf must band together to stop the zombies.

== Cast ==
- David Lockhart as Mortimer
- Camille Montgomery as Rhiannon
- Rick Mora as Brother Wolf
- Robert Amstler as The German

== Production ==
Filming took place near Yosemite National Park.

== Release ==
The Dead and the Damned premiered at the Another Hole In the Head Film Festival on July 17, 2010. It was released on DVD in the US on July 26, 2011, and in the UK on August 1, 2011.

== Reception ==
Jim Harrington of the San Jose Mercury News called the plot "as ludicrous as it is fun". Rod Lott of the Oklahoma Gazette called it "proof that bargain-basement zombie flicks, which are dime-a-dozen these days, shouldn't be made". Gareth Jones of Dread Central rated it 1.5/5 stars and wrote, "With too little plot and too little visual imagination to justify a feature runtime, we're left with plodding scenes of predictable exposition, poorly executed action and lingering gazes at bare breasts peppered with occasional minutes of something approaching genuine entertainment." Ben Bussey of Brutal as Hell wrote that despite its amateurishness the film "remains a reasonable bit of fun so long as your expectations aren't too high". HorrorTalk rated it 2.5/5 stars and wrote, "The Dead and the Damned had a lot of potential, on both sides of the camera, and it could have succeeded with a bit more experience." Alex DiVincenzo of HorrorNews.Net wrote, "If there's not a gun fight or a zombie chase on screen, the movie is boring." Writing in The Zombie Movie Encyclopedia, Volume 2, academic Peter Dendle called it "mostly a zombie shooting gallery".

== Sequel ==
A loosely connected sequel, The Dead and the Damned 2, was released in October 2014.
