= Good for Nothing (2011 film) =

2011 film

- Directed by: Mike Wallis
- Written by: Mike Wallis
- Produced by: Inge Rademeyer; Mike Wallis
- Starring: Cohen Holloway; Inge Rademeyer
- Cinematography: Mathew Knight
- Edited by: Greg Daniels
- Music by: John Psathas
- Production company: Mi Films
- Distributed by: Cinemax (Hungary); Screen Media Films (Canada/United States)
- Release dates: 29 January 2011 (Santa Barbara Film Festival); 3 May 2012 (New Zealand)
- Running time: 92 minutes
- Country: New Zealand
- Language: English
- Box office: $186,119

Good for Nothing is a 2011 New Zealand-made Western film starring Inge Rademeyer and Cohen Holloway, and directed by Mike Wallis. The film along with director Mike Wallis has been included in Leonard Maltin's 'Fifty Notable Debut Features of the Past Twenty Years' list in The New York Times bestseller – Leonard Maltin's Movie Guide. The film premiered at the Santa Barbara Film Festival on 29 January 2011.

== Plot ==
Isabella Montgomery, a proper English woman, must go to her uncle's ranch in the American West after the death of her father. While being escorted to the ranch by workers from the ranch, she is kidnapped by an outlaw. The outlaw tries to rape her but experiences erectile dysfunction and goes into town, leaving Isabella tied up. The outlaw is unsuccessful in finding a solution for his problem, so after shooting several people, he discovers Isabella has escaped and come into town, and leaves with her. The townspeople assumed because of her tattered clothes that Isabella was a prostitute. A posse is formed to capture the outlaw and Isabella, with a bonus for capturing Isabella. The outlaw visits a Chinese mining camp and a Native American medicine man. Over time, the outlaw and Isabella develop feelings for each other. The posse catches up to them, but their leader dies in a shootout, the outlaw has disappeared, and the others decide they won't get paid and decide to rape Isabella. The outlaw comes out of hiding and shoots the others and delivers Isabella to her destination.

== Cast ==
- Cohen Holloway as The Man
- Inge Rademeyer as Isabella Montgomery
- Jon Pheloung as The Sheriff
- Toa Waaka as Native American medicine man

== Reception ==
On review aggregator website Rotten Tomatoes, the film has a 56% approval rating based on 17 reviews, with an average ranking of 5.6/10. On Metacritic, the film has a weighted average score of 56 out of a 100 based on 6 critics, indicating "mixed or average reviews".

Andy Webster of The New York Times called the movie "a slender movie of humble, welcome charms", and said first-time director Mike Wallis used the scenery of New Zealand to "maximum advantage". He pointed out that while the movie appears to promise romance, it is not "predictable".

Michael Rechtshaffen of The Hollywood Reporter said it was "a promising first feature effort" that was like "a Kiwi spaghetti western filtered through the offbeat sensibilities of early Sam Raimi or the Coen brothers".

John Anderson from Variety said it has "a tone so deadpan it becomes laugh-out-loud funny" and it is "a winning balance of humor and pluck". He criticised its US release by saying that "Proper positioning might have won the film a better theatrical shot, and perhaps even a cult following. But a robust afterlife should follow its limited opening".

According to Nick Pinkerton of The Village Voice, "Good for Nothing has a nice comic sense of the brushfire eruptions of Western violence".

Not everyone felt the same about the film. Sam Adams of The A.V. Club wrote "The film's antipodean locales provide plenty of uncharted territory, vast expanses of untamed land that offer endless opportunity but little guidance. A man could get lost out there, and Wallis does".

Identical view was from Chuck Bowen of Slant Magazine who added that "The title is apropos, but it's also an understatement".

== See also ==
- Cinema of New Zealand
