= Brian Austin Green =

American actor (born 1973)

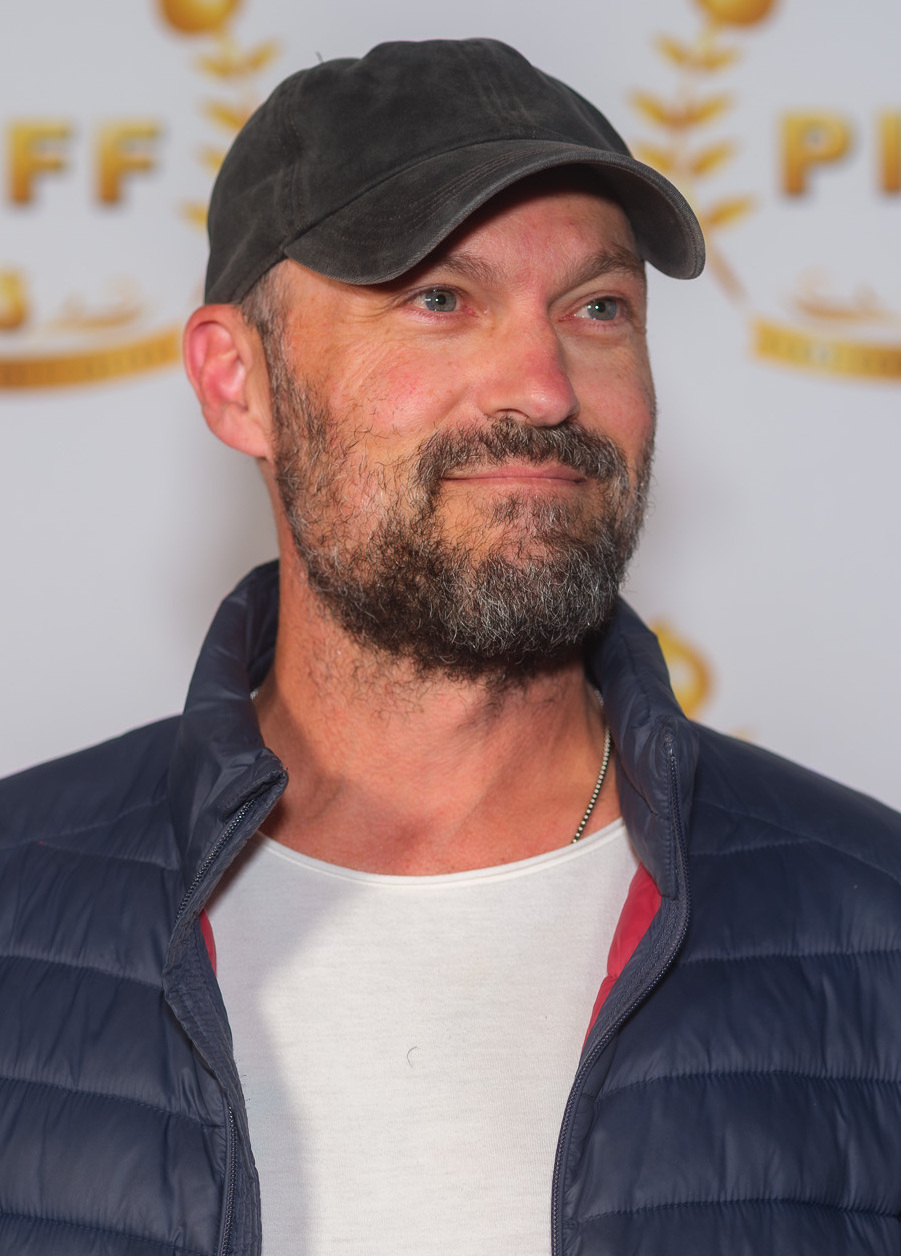
- Green at the 2025 Pasadena International Film Festival
- Born: Brian Green; July 15, 1973 (age 53); Van Nuys, California, U.S.
- Occupation: Actor
- Years active: 1985–present
- Spouse: Megan Fox (m. 2010; div. 2022)
- Partners: Vanessa Marcil (1999–2003); Sharna Burgess (2020–present; engaged)
- Children: 5

Brian Austin Green (born Brian Green; July 15, 1973) is an American actor, best known for his portrayal of David Silver on the television series Beverly Hills, 90210 (1990–2000). Green was also a series regular on television shows Freddie (2005–2006), Terminator: The Sarah Connor Chronicles (2008–2009), Wedding Band (2012–2013), and Anger Management (2012–2014).

== Early life ==
Green was born in Van Nuys, California, the son of Joyce and George Green. His ancestry shares Italian, Scottish, English, German and Hungarian descent. His middle name, "Austin", was added to differentiate himself from another actor when he joined the Screen Actors Guild as a child.

== Career ==
Prior to his role on Beverly Hills, 90210, Green had a recurring role for three seasons (1986–1989) on the CBS primetime soap opera Knots Landing, playing the role of Brian Cunningham, the son of Abby Cunningham Ewing (Donna Mills). He reprised his role in the television miniseries Knots Landing: Back to the Cul-de-Sac (1997). He appeared in the 1987 pilot of Good Morning, Miss Bliss as Adam Montcrief.

Producer Aaron Spelling stated that Green was cast as David Silver because of their similar personalities. The character was often scripted to reflect Green's own interests. As the series progressed, the character began to experiment with hip hop music and DJing, as did Green himself. In 1996, Green dropped "Austin" from his professional name and attempted a career as a rapper, releasing one album, One Stop Carnival, produced by The Pharcyde member Slimkid3. In the 1990s, Green was a guest star on Growing Pains, Parker Lewis Can't Lose, Melrose Place, Saved by the Bell: The College Years, Fantastic Four, Mad TV, Biker Mice from Mars, Malibu Shores, Sabrina, the Teenage Witch and Knots Landing: Back to the Cul-de-Sac.

Green appeared briefly in the multiple award-winning Showtime drama series Resurrection Blvd. as Luke Bonner (2001–2004), a police officer attending law school. He had a cameo on Hope & Faith where he met Megan Fox; they started dating in 2004. He appeared on the ABC sitcom Freddie (2005) starring Freddie Prinze, Jr. He was a guest star on The Twilight Zone, Las Vegas and CSI: Crime Scene Investigation. He also appeared alongside former 90210 cast member Ian Ziering in the Tony Scott film Domino as parodies of themselves. Green appeared in a horror short called Grace, which was set around a miscarriage gone bad, and features Gilmore Girls actress Liza Weil as his love interest. It premiered at the Fangoria Weekend of Horrors on June 2, 2006, and was reworked as a full-length feature film (2009). He was a guest star on George Lopez in 2006 as Chris.

Green played Derek Reese in Terminator: The Sarah Connor Chronicles, a Resistance fighter sent to the past by the future John Connor. The character is the older brother of Kyle Reese (John Connor's father) and paternal uncle of John. Green was a recurring character in season 1 but became a regular at the start of season 2, following a positive response from critics and fans. His character is killed by a Terminator in the penultimate episode, but another Derek from an alternate timeline is introduced in the series finale and would have remained on the show if it had been renewed for a third season.

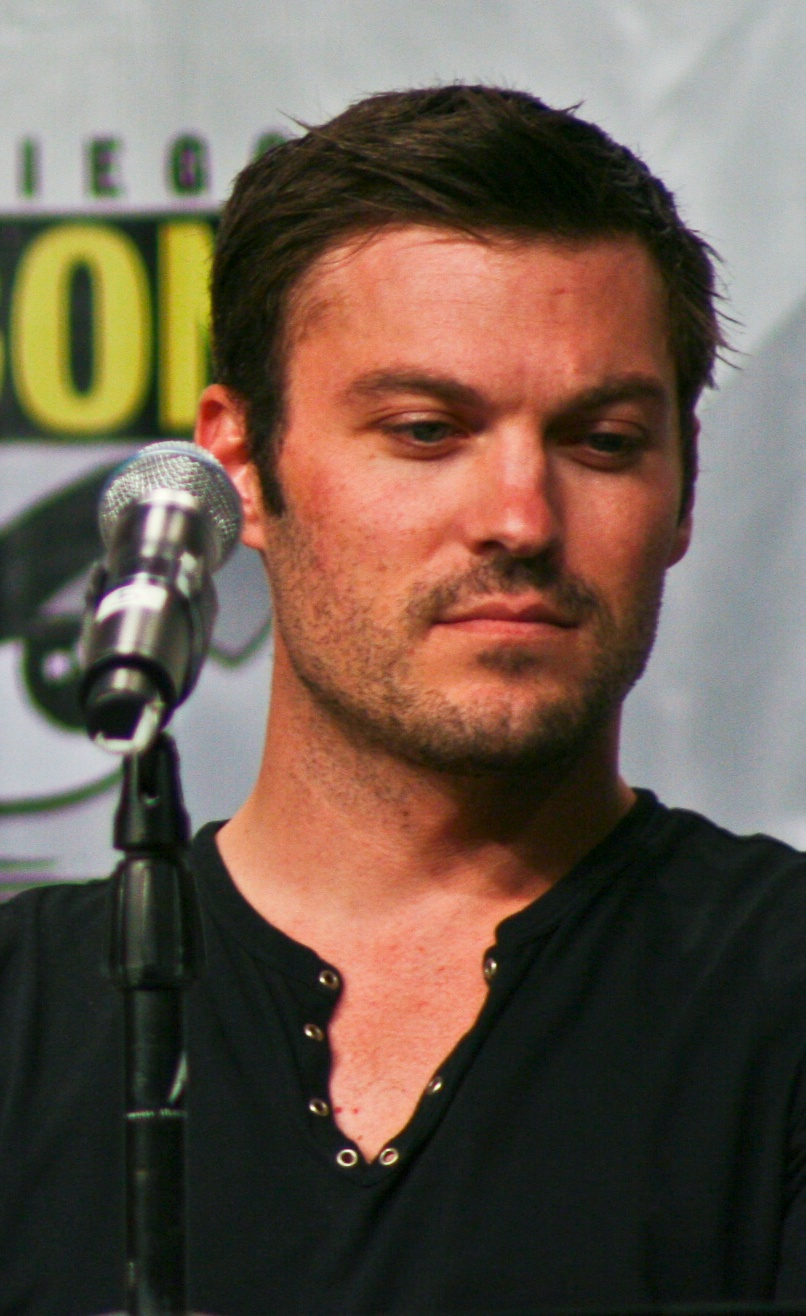
Green in 2008

Green guest-starred on the season 7 finale of CSI: Miami as Anthony Green. Green was cast in The CW's new drama pilot Body Politic, along with Minka Kelly, Gabrielle Union, and Jason Dohring. The series was not picked up for fall 2009. Green said in an interview that he was co-producing a big screen adaptation of Fathom, starring Megan Fox. On September 27, 2009, Green made a guest appearance on the television series Saturday Night Live in a skit involving girlfriend (later his wife) Megan Fox. In the skit Green played a version of the Transformer Bumblebee in which Bumblebee is merely a man wearing a Bumblebee mask. Green was cast as Clay in One Tree Hill's seventh season. Green then left the cast because of scheduling conflicts and the role was then given to Robert Buckley; Green instead starred as superhero Callan in the Patrick Durham-directed movie Cross, which was released to DVD and download in May 2011.

In 2009, Green was cast as Metallo in Smallville. He appeared in three episodes in the ninth season between 2009 and 2010, the first being the ninth-season premiere episode "Savior". The character is a war-time reporter, similar to the Silver Age John Corben. As a back-story for this version, he had been recently stationed in Afghanistan. When he meets Lois Lane, he expresses his distaste for vigilantes, particularly "the Blur" (Clark Kent) due to the hero saving a prison bus only for a convict to escape and slay his sister. After being struck in a hit and run, Corben awoke to find himself possessing cybernetic enhancements – including an artificial heart powered by kryptonite. After kidnapping Lois Lane as bait, the villain was confronted and defeated by Clark Kent. It was subsequently revealed in the episode "Conspiracy" that Zod's disciples were behind Corben's revival. Corben is "reactivated" in the episode "Upgrade" after Luthorcorp scientists are able to correct the initial design flaw in the Kryptonite heart that causes an adrenal overload and resulting psychosis. Though Green had expressed willingness to reprise the character in the 10th and final season, the character was portrayed by a body double for his final appearance in the episode "Prophecy" – presumably due to budget and the cameo nature of the appearance. Green's likeness would be used however for the character's appearance in the Season Eleven comic continuation.

In 2010, Green appeared in a multi-episode story arc on the ABC series Desperate Housewives. He played Keith Watson, Bree's contractor and lover for the first part of the season.

In 2012, Green had a guest appearance in the sitcom Anger Management playing Sean, the boyfriend of Charlie's ex-wife, Jen in the first episode of the show. This episode broke a ratings record with 5.74 million viewers on its series debut night and ranks as the most-watched sitcom premiere in cable history. He returned to the show in the episode "Charlie Breaks Up With Kate", and was promoted to series regular in June 2013.

Green was a guest star in the finale episode of the second season of Happy Endings. He played Chris, who meets dateless Penny via Skype. He returned in the third-season premiere "Cazsh Dummy Spillionaires". In the same year, Green starred in the television series Wedding Band, about a group of friends who perform at weddings. In the TBS comedy, Green plays Tommy, the frontman for Mother of the Bride, a group of four buddies who aren't ready to give up the dream of being rock stars. On January 22, 2013, TBS cancelled the series after one season because of low ratings.

In 2019, Green reunited with his original Beverly Hills, 90210 castmates Jennie Garth, Jason Priestley, Shannen Doherty, Gabrielle Carteris, Ian Ziering, and Tori Spelling for BH90210, which was a six-episode series in which the cast played heightened, fictionalized versions of themselves. The series aired on FOX in August and September 2019 and was canceled after one season.

In 2020, Green competed in season four of The Masked Singer as "Giraffe". He was eliminated in his second appearance. Robin Thicke joined him in his encore of Kool and the Gang's "Get Down on It". He also served as a panelist on its spin-off series The Masked Dancer. In 2023, Green competed on the fifth season of the Australian version of The Masked Singer as "Crash Test Dummy". He was eliminated in the premiere episode.

In September 2021, Green was announced as one of the celebrities competing on season 30 of Dancing with the Stars. Green's dance partner was his girlfriend, Sharna Burgess. He was the third celebrity to be eliminated from the show, ultimately placing 13th.

In 2026, Green competed in the HGTV series Totally 90s House while being partnered with actresses Beverley Mitchell and Jodie Sweetin.

== Personal life ==
Green won the celebrity portion of the Grand Prix of Long Beach in early 2010.

In April 2017, Green co-created a podcast with Derek Russell titled ...With Brian Austin Green. The show went on indefinite hiatus in 2022, with Green signing an exclusive deal with iHeartRadio to start a new podcast, Old-ish, in 2023 alongside Sharna Burgess and Randy Spelling.

In June 2022, Green revealed that he has suffered from ulcerative colitis.

=== Relationships ===
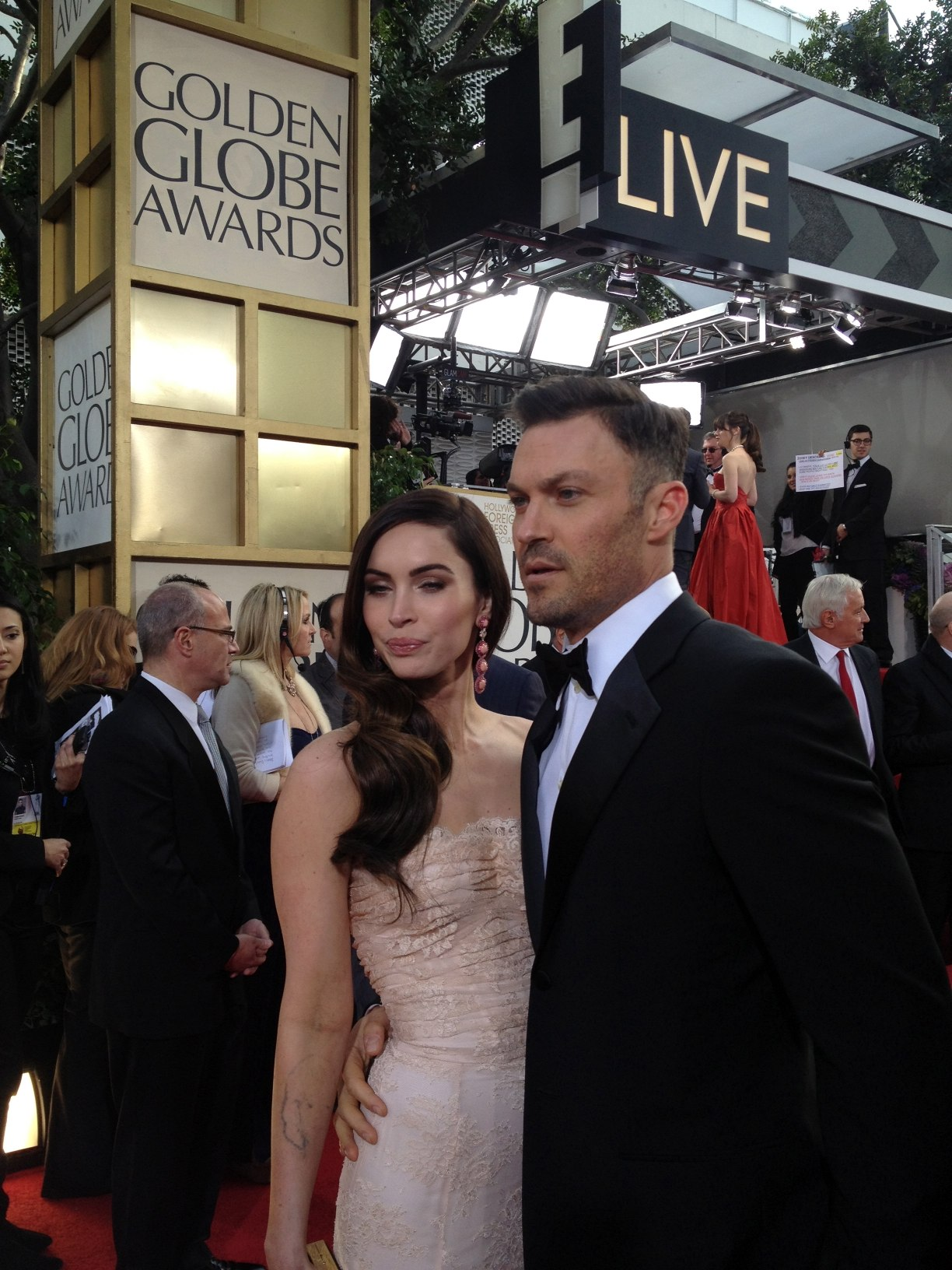
Megan Fox and Green at the 70th Golden Globes on January 13, 2013

Green dated his Beverly Hills, 90210 co-star Tiffani Thiessen from 1992 to 1995.

During his time on 90210, he dated Tichina Arnold, but they ended their relationship due to the hardship of being in an interracial relationship. They remain on good terms. In 1999, Green started dating his Beverly Hills, 90210 castmate Vanessa Marcil, whom he met on set. The two became engaged in July 2001 and had son Kassius in 2002. They planned to wed that year, but ended their relationship in 2003.

In 2004, Green began dating actress Megan Fox, having first met on the set of Hope & Faith when he was 30 years old and she was 18. Fox said Green was initially hesitant to enter a relationship with her due to the age difference. Fox said, "I had to convince him that I was slightly more responsible and well-spoken and had other things to bring to the table besides being 18." They became engaged in 2006 but broke off their engagement in February 2009. Later that year, their home was targeted by a group of fashion-motivated criminals known as "The Bling Ring", who initially targeted them to steal Fox's designer clothes.

In June 2010, Green and Fox announced they were engaged again, and several days later on June 24, the two wed at the Four Seasons resort on the island of Hawaii. They have three sons together, born in 2012, 2014, and 2016. Fox filed for divorce from Green on August 21, 2015, a few days after the couple announced their separation. They reconciled in early 2016. On April 25, 2019, Fox filed to dismiss the divorce in Los Angeles, California. In May 2020, Green announced that he and Fox had separated after nearly 10 years of marriage. In November 2020, Fox filed for divorce from Green for a second time. They reached a final settlement on October 15, 2021 and finalized their divorce on February 8, 2022.

Green has been dating Australian professional dancer Sharna Burgess since October 2020. They announced they were expecting their first child together on February 4, 2022. Their son was born on June 28, 2022. On September 22, 2023, the couple announced their engagement.

=== Philanthropy ===
Both Green and ex-wife Megan Fox are supporters of Generosity Water, and have funded the creation of over ten water wells for the organization. Through his podcast, Green organized a charity event to benefit the organization on September 1, 2018. He hosted another charity event on August 31, 2019, a live Beverly Hlls, 90210 reunion podcast taping at Torrance High School (the original West Beverly High). The event featured fans, original castmates Ian Ziering, Gabrielle Carteris, Carol Potter, Christine Elise McCarthy, Joe E. Tata, and Doug Emerson, and special musical guest Color Me Badd.

Green and girlfriend Sharna Burgess took part in the Search4Smiles campaign supporting the Trueheart Search Engine, which donates 80% of their profits to charity.

=== Paparazzi lawsuit ===
In March 2012, photographer Delbert Shaw sued Green and ex-wife Fox in Los Angeles County Superior Court for allegedly assaulting him after he took photographs of the couple while Green and Fox were vacationing in Hawaii in 2010. In June 2012, Green said he was defending himself against Shaw and that Fox should not be included in the lawsuit. In January 2013, the judge ordered the paparazzo to pay the couple $620 towards their legal fees. The case was ultimately dismissed by the court.

== Filmography ==
=== Film ===
Year	Title	Role	Notes
1985	The Canterville Ghost	Willie	
1988	Baby M	Ryan Whitehead	
1990	Kid	Metal Louie	
1991	An American Summer	Charles 'Fin' Findley	
1991	Kickboxer 2	Tommy	
1995	She Fought Alone	Ethan	
1996	A Friend's Betrayal	Paul Hewitt	
1996	Her Costly Affair	Jeff Dante	
1997	Laws of Deception	Cal Miller	
1997	Unwed Father	Jason Kempler	
2002	Ronnie	Stanley	
2002	Purgatory Flats	Randy Mecklin	
2002	Bleach	Zach	
2003	Southside	Jack O'Malley	
2003	This Time Around	Drew Hesler	
2003	Fish Without a Bicycle	Ben	Also director
2005	Domino	Himself	
2006	Grace	Jimmy	Short
2006	Hollywood Familia	Himself	
2008	How to Lose Friends & Alienate People	Party Guest	Uncredited
2008	Impact Point	Holden	
2009	Stay Cool	Narrator	
2009	Turning Japanese	Sam	
2010	Urgency	Tony West	
2010	The Wild Girl	Ned Giles	
2010	Monster Heroes	James	
2010	Stage 4	Himself	
2011	Cross	Callan	Also producer
2011	ChromeSkull: Laid to Rest 2	Preston	
2014	Don't Blink	Jack	Also associate producer
2017	Cross Wars	Callan	Also producer
2017	Chasing Titles Vol. 1	Joe Holmes	Short
2018	Guardian Angel	Fireman Rick	Short
2019	Cross: Rise of the Villains	Callan	Also executive producer
2021	Kid 90	Himself	Documentary
2021	John Bronco Rides Again	Brian Austin Green	Short
2022	Last the Night	Mr. Dunbar	
2023	Bootyology	Brian Austin Green	
2023	Beautiful Disaster	Mick Abernathy	
2023	Cross 4: Cross Bones	Callan	
2023	Transformation	David	
2024	The Night They Came Home	Chuck Palmer	
2024	Chasing Midnight	Chris Habbyshaw	
2024	Golden	Frank	
2024	Cutthroat	Bob Gold	
2025	Zombie Plane		
TBA	Perfectly Imperfect	Reuben	
TBA	The 3 Killer Pigs		
TBA	Complex, Texas		

=== Television ===
Year	Title	Role	Notes
1986	The New Leave It to Beaver	Jason	Episode: "Does Not a Woman Make"
1986–1989	Knots Landing	Brian Cunningham	27 episodes
1987	Highway to Heaven	Matthew Evans	Episode: "Normal People"
1987	Small Wonder	Gary	2 episodes
1987	Good Morning, Miss Bliss	Adam Montcrief	Episode: "Pilot"
1989	Baywatch: Panic at Malibu Pier	Brian	TV movie; uncredited
1989	Adventures in Babysitting	Daryl Coopersmith	TV movie
1990–2000	Beverly Hills, 90210	David Silver	Main role; producer (48 episodes); director (1 episode)
1991	Growing Pains	Rapper in Fresh Kid's Music Group	Episode: "Ben's Rap Group"
1992	Melrose Place	David Silver	3 episodes
1992	Parker Lewis Can't Lose	Brian Austin Green	Episode: "Geek Tragedy"
1993	Saved by the Bell: The College Years	Brian Austin Green	Episode: "A Thanksgiving Story"
1994	Fantastic Four	Johnny Storm/The Human Torch (voice)	Main cast (season 1)
1994	Saturday Night Live	Himself	Episode: "Steve Martin/Eric Clapton"
1996	MADtv	White Chocolate	Episode: "#1.14"
1996	Biker Mice from Mars	Rimfire (voice)	5 episodes
1996	Malibu Shores	Sandy Gage	Episode: "New Kids in Town"
1996	Sabrina, the Teenage Witch	Chad Corey Dylan	Episode: "Dream Date"
1997	Knots Landing: Back to the Cul-de-Sac	Brian Cunningham	2 episodes
2001	Resurrection Blvd.	Luke Bonner	Episode: "Arriba Y Abajo"
2001–2003	Stacey Stone	Lorenzo	15 episodes
2002	Trailer Park Boys	2nd Police Officer	3 episodes
2002	The Twilight Zone	Sean Moore	Episode: "Found and Lost"
2003	CSI: Crime Scene Investigation	Gregory Curtwell	Episode: "Coming of Rage"
2004	Las Vegas	Connor Mills	Episode: "Things That Go Jump in the Night"
2004	Hope & Faith	Himself	Episode: "9021-Uh-Oh"
2005	Robot Chicken	Self / Kratos / General (voices)	Episode: "The Core, the Thief, His Wife and Her Lover"
2005–2006	Freddie	Chris	Main role
2006	George Lopez	Chris	Episode: "George Gets Cross Over Freddie"
2007	Untitled David Kohan/Max Mutchnick TV Project	Noah	TV film
2008–2009	Terminator: The Sarah Connor Chronicles	Derek Reese	Main role
2009	CSI: Miami	Anthony Green	Episode: "Seeing Red" (Part 1)"
2009	Body Politic	Lucky Evans	TV film
2009	Saturday Night Live	Bumblebee	Episode: "Megan Fox/U2"
2009–2010	Smallville	John Corben/Metallo	3 episodes
2010–2011	Desperate Housewives	Keith Watson	Recurring role
2011	Mobsters	Carmine	Episode: "Carmine or Brian?"
2011	Adults Only	Dick	
2011	Suite 7	Cole	Episode: "Captive Audience"
2012	Happy Endings	Chris	2 episodes
2012–2013	Wedding Band	Tommy	Recurring role
2012–2014	Anger Management	Sean Healy	Recurring role
2019	Magnum P.I.	Special Agent Adam Kreshner	Episode: "The Day It All Came Together"
2019	BH90210	Brian Austin Green	Main role; executive producer
2020–2021	The Masked Singer	Giraffe	Contestant (season 4)
2020–2021	The Masked Dancer	Himself / Panelist	6 episodes
2021	The Conners	Jeff	4 episodes
2021	Dancing with the Stars	Himself	5 episodes
2022	I Can See Your Voice	Guest Panelist	Episode: "Episode 3: Kelly Rowland, Kelly Osbourne, Brian Austin Green, Cheryl Hines, Adrienne Houghton"
2023	That '90s Show	David Silver	Episode: "The Birthday Girl"
2023	Cape Holly Christmas	John Davis	Television
2023	The Masked Singer Australia	Crash Test Dummy	Contestant on season 5; Episode: "Premiere"; Eliminated in first episode
2023	Special Forces: World's Toughest Test	Himself	Contestant on season 2; 3 episodes; 10th place
2026	Totally 90s House	Himself - contestant	Reality show

=== Music videos ===
Year	Title	Artist	Role
1992	"Saving Forever for You"	Shanice	David Silver
1996	"You Send Me"	Brian Austin Green	Himself

=== Other credits ===
Year	Title	Role	Notes
2002	Southside	Executive producer	Film
2002	Untitled: A Love Story	Co-producer	Film

== Awards and nominations ==
- Nominated for Best Young Actor Starring in a Television Drama Series for Knots Landing (1987)
- Nominated for Best Young Actor in a Nighttime Drama Series for Knots Landing (1988)
- Won Best Young Actor Starring in a TV Movie, Pilot or Special for Adventures in Babysitting (1989)
- Nominated for Best Young Actor Supporting or Recurring Role For a TV Series for Beverly Hills, 90210 (1991)
- Won Best Young Actor Co-Starring in a Television Series for Beverly Hills, 90210 (1992)
- Won Palm Beach International Film Festival Special Jury Prize for a feature film directorial debut for Fish Without a Bicycle (2003)
- Won Best Feature Philadelphia FirstGlance Film Festival for Fish Without a Bicycle (2003)
- Won Prize Best Dramatic Feature Los Angeles DIY Film Festival for Fish Without a Bicycle (2003)

== Discography ==
- One Stop Carnival (1996)
- Esthero: Wikked Lil' Grrrls (2005) (drums)
- Wedding Band (2012–2013) (soundtrack released exclusively as singles on iTunes as Mother of the Bride)
