= Ujeli: A Child Bride in Nepal =

1992 Nepalese film on child marriage

Ujeli: A child bride in Nepal
- Directed by: Deependra Gauchan
- Starring: Brinda Adkhikari
- Cinematography: Siddhartha Shakya
- Release date: 14 February 1992 (Nepal)
- Country: Nepal
- Language: Nepali

Ujeli: A child bride in Nepal is a social tragic drama depicting child marriage culture in Nepal. This film underlines the sharp distinctions between the roles of boys and girls in Nepal such as education, food and medical care.

The film is directed by Deependra Gauchan and produced by UNICEF.

== Plot ==
This film shows the life of a 10-year-old girl named Ujeli (उजेली), who is forced into an arranged marriage. After the marriage, the husband is allowed to attend school while Ujeli is forced to work at home in spite of her strong desire to study in school. As the story develops, her brother-in-law’s wife also dies in pregnancy because she is also too young to bear a child.

== Cast ==
- Brinda Adhikari
- Prashant Khadka

== Award ==
- Nominated for NHK award in 1993.
