= Uncle Brian =

- Directed by: Nick McAnulty
- Written by: Nick McAnulty; Brian Allan Stewart
- Produced by: Nick McAnulty; Aaron Olegario; Brian Allan Stewart; Matt Vatcher
- Starring: Daniel MacLean; Nicole Tiraborelli; Danny MacDonald; Tracy Genrich-Mitchell; Farhang Ghajar; Sarah Spencer; Ryan Lindsay; Lisa Ferretti
- Music by: Charlie Hack
- Release date: August 19, 2010
- Country: Canada
- Language: English

Uncle Brian is a Canadian 2010 comedy-drama film directed by Nick McAnulty and starring Daniel MacLean in the title role.

The film premiered at the 2010 New York City International Film Festival where it was honoured with two award nominations including for Best Feature Film, and winning the Best Lead Actor award for Daniel MacLean.

== Reviews ==
- Quiet Earth
