= Vellakkuppayam =

- Directed by: Ramees Nandi
- Written by: Ramees Nandi
- Produced by: A.C Sudheendranath
- Starring: Nivas Babu, Madhura Munjal, Keerthana Poduval
- Music by: Firos Nad
- Production company: Nad Movie Entertinement
- Release date: 2014
- Country: India
- Language: Malayalam

Vellakkuppayam (English: White Shirt) is a 2014 Malayalam romantic drama film written and directed by Ramees Nandi.

This film tell a strange triangle love story. Film also focus on the celebration and music of Youngsters. The film will be produced by A.C Sudheenthranath under Nath Movie Entertinement. Firos Nad doing the Music.

== Cast ==
- Nivas Babu
- Keerthana Poduval
- Salim Kumar
- Neena Kurup
