= Us and Our Education =

2009 British film

- Directed by: Chris Burns
- Written by: Eve Jones
- Produced by: Eve Jones
- Cinematography: Simon Smith
- Edited by: Dominic Johnson
- Production companies: 961 Productions, SLS Video Productions, Women and Theatre
- Release date: 27 February 2009
- Running time: 28 minutes
- Country: United Kingdom
- Language: English

Us and Our Education is a 2009 British documentary film written and produced by Eve Jones and directed by Chris Burns. It explores learning disabilities within schools and in the workplace by centering on weekly workshops that were to be used as the basis to a theatre performance by several daycare centers in Worcestershire.
