= The Village of Love =

- Directed by: Ahmad Afsaneh
- Release date: 1950
- Running time: 45 minutes
- Country: Iran
- Language: Persian

The Village of Love (Persian: Dehkadeh eshq) is a 1950 Iranian film directed by Ahmad Afsaneh.

== Bibliography ==
- Mohammad Ali Issari. Cinema in Iran, 1900-1979. Scarecrow Press, 1989.
