= Up to Our Necks =

Up to our Necks
- Produced by: Slipknot
- Starring: Slipknot
- Distributed by: Chrome Dreams
- Release date: 2004
- Running time: 65 min.
- Country: United States
- Language: English

Up to our Necks is an unauthorized documentary film on the American heavy metal band Slipknot. The unrated biography shows never-before-seen interviews with the band members, but does not have live footage nor music by the band.
