= Kolkata Book Fair =

Annual book fair in Kolkata, India

International Kolkata Book Fair কলকাতা আন্তর্জাতিক বই মেলা
- Logo of International Kolkata Book Fair
- Status: Active
- Genre: Multi-genre
- Frequency: Annually
- Venue: Central Park Mela Ground, Salt Lake, Kolkata
- Location: Kolkata
- Country: India
- Inaugurated: 1976; 50 years ago
- Organizer: Publishers & Booksellers Guild
- Website: www.kolkatabookfair.net

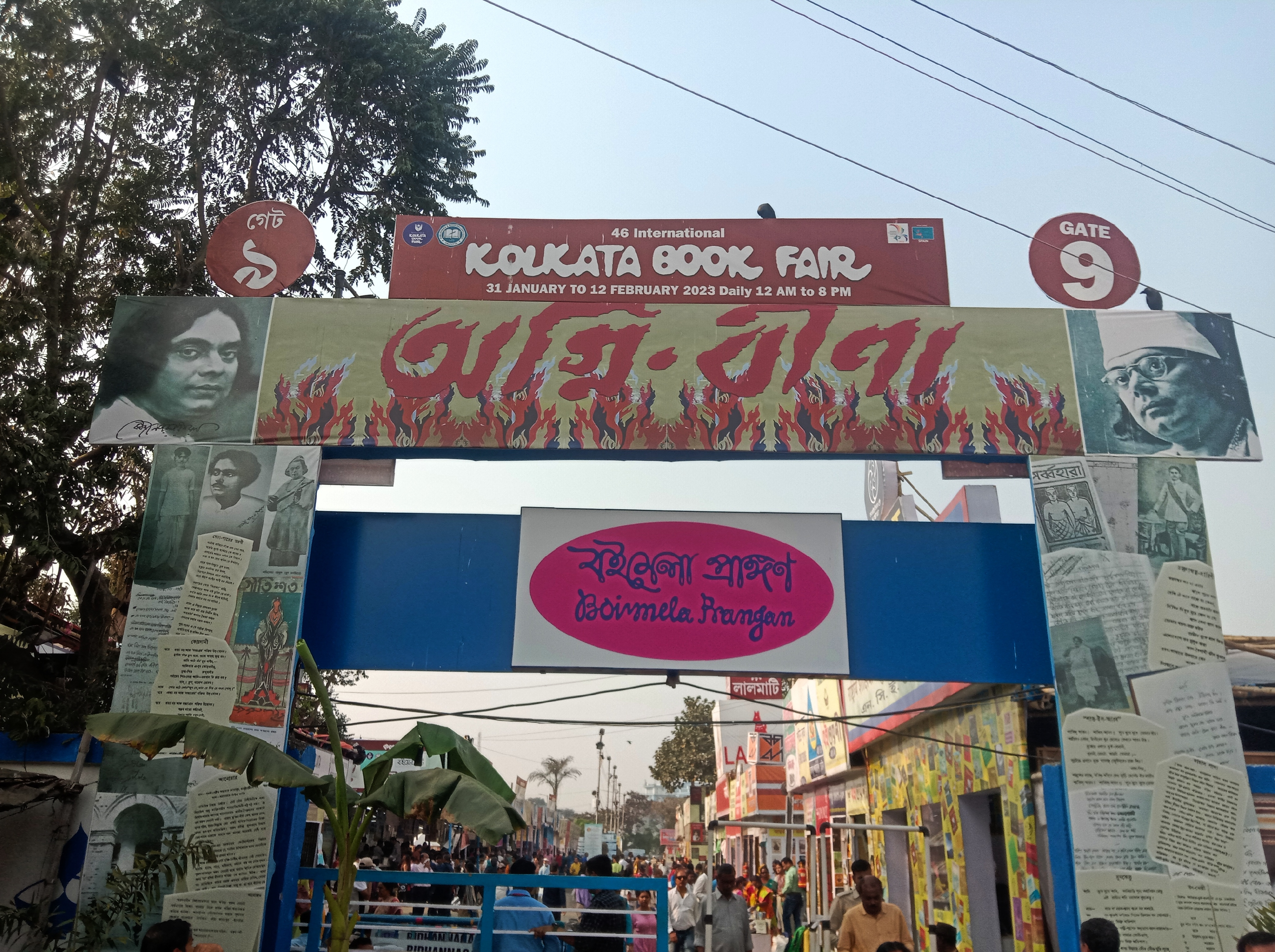
Entrance façade of the International Kolkata Book Fair 2023 at the Central Park Mela Ground, Salt Lake, Kolkata, West Bengal, India.

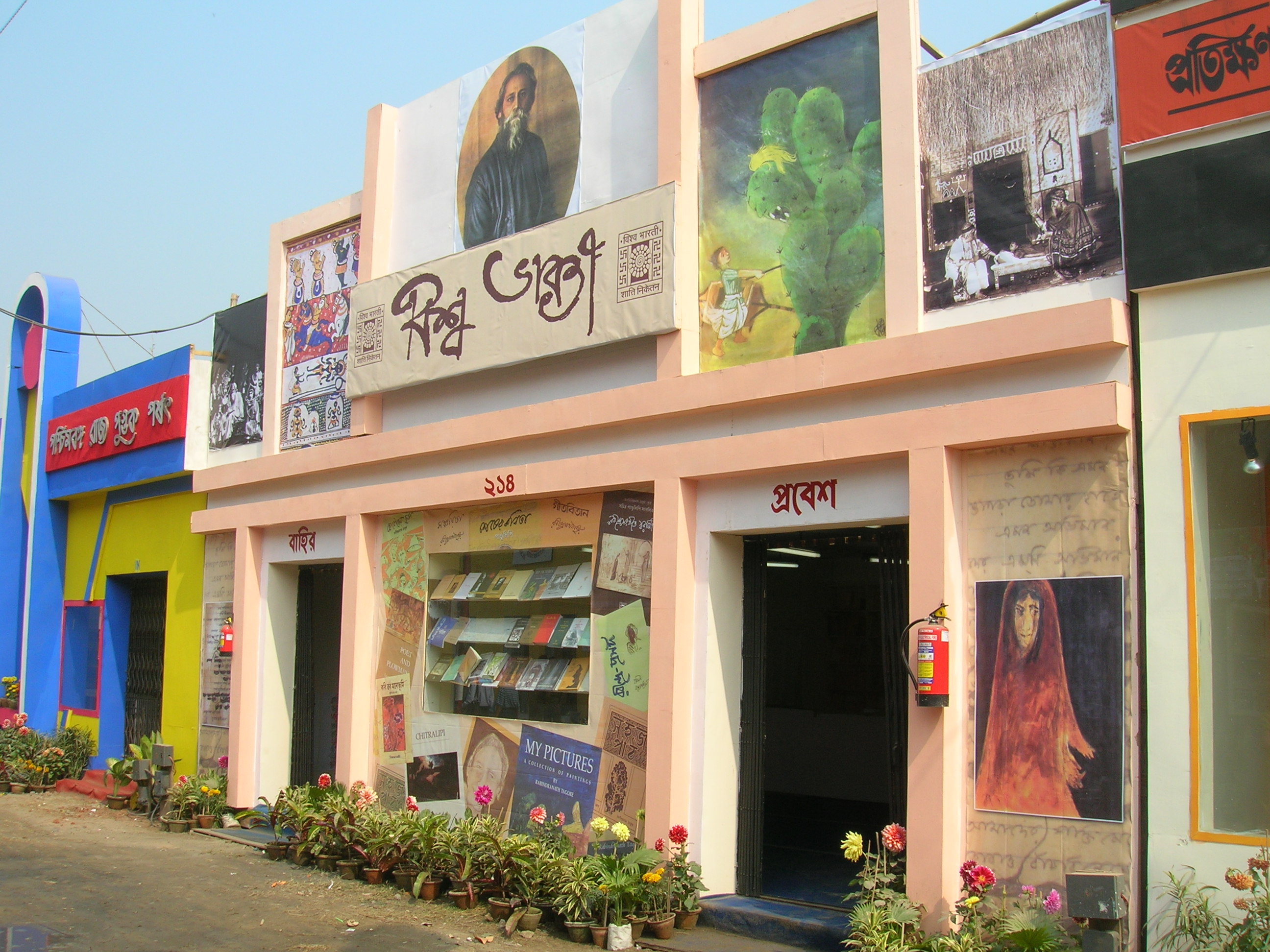
Visvabharati book stall

The International Kolkata Book Fair (formerly Calcutta Book Fair) is a winter fair in Kolkata. It is a unique book fair in the sense of not being a trade fair—the book fair is primarily for the general public rather than whole-sale distributors. It is the world's largest non-trade book fair, Asia's largest book fair (by publishers) and the most attended book fair in the world. It is the world's third-largest annual conglomeration of books after the Frankfurt Book Fair and the London Book Fair. Many Kolkatans consider the book fair an inherent part of Kolkata, and instances of people visiting the fair every day during its duration are not uncommon. The fair offers a typical fairground experience with a book flavour—with picnickers, singer-songwriters, and candy floss vendors. With a total footfall of over 2 million people, it is world's largest book fair by attendance.

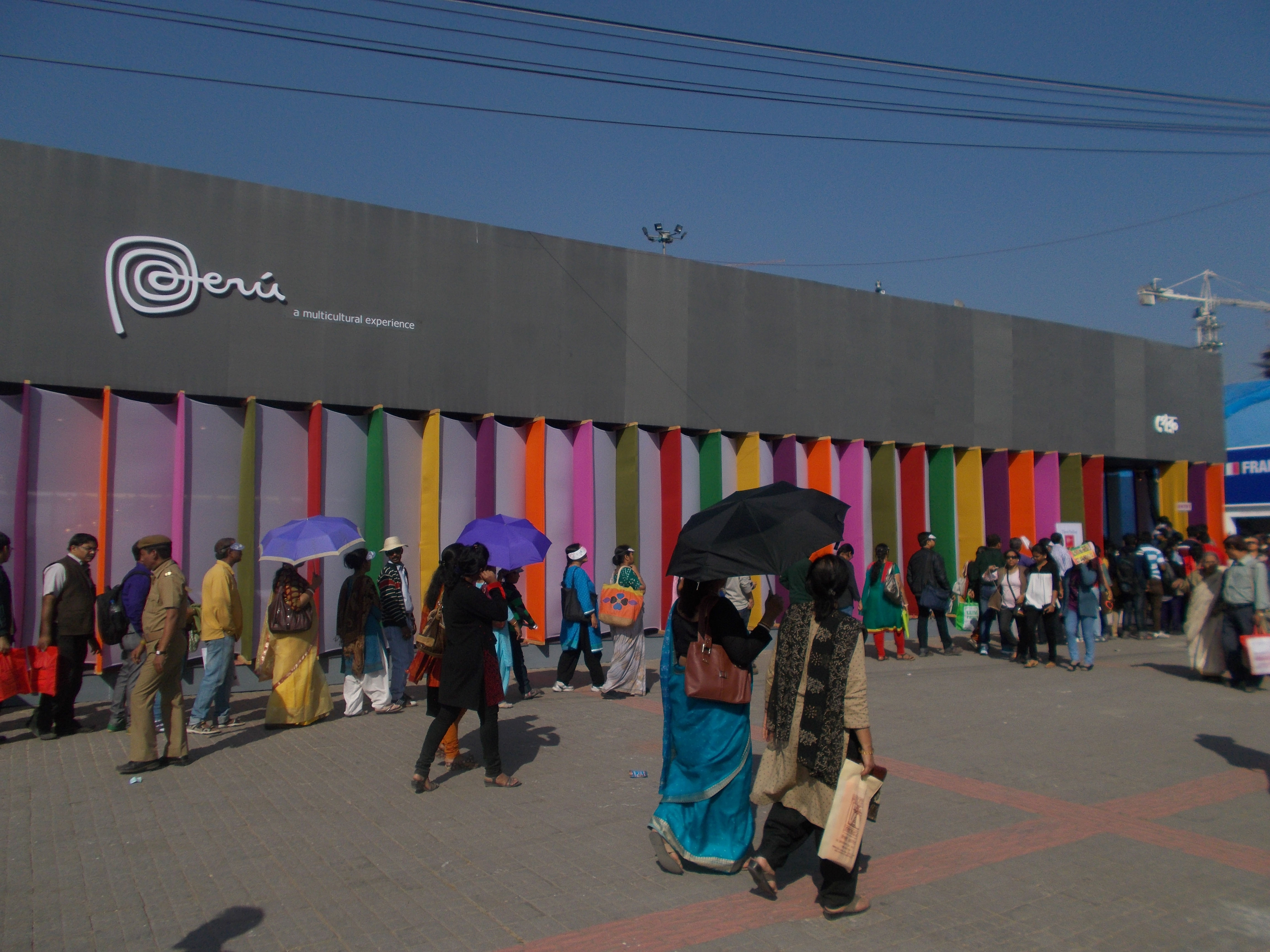
The focal theme of 38th Kolkata International Book Fair 2014 was Peru

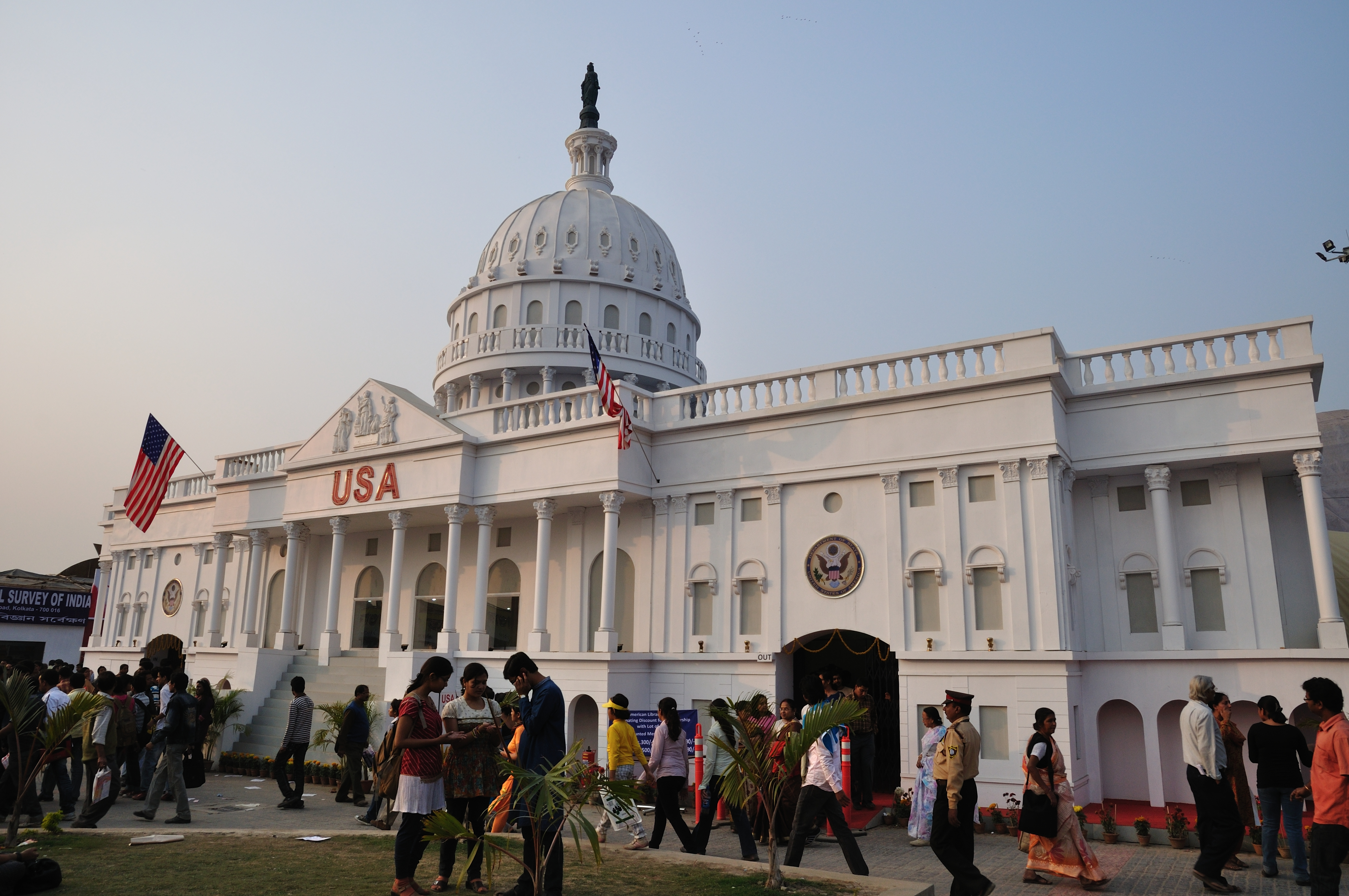
2011 Kolkata book fair theme country United States

The success of the Kolkata Book Fair has resulted in many book fairs in smaller cities in West Bengal like Siliguri, and also in Kolkata urban region itself. The book fair was inspired, in turn, by the Frankfurt Book Fair. In the year 2027, the Kolkata Book Fair will become the first Indian book fair to reach 50th edition, making it the oldest annual book fair of India. The New Delhi World Book Fair, though inaugurated in 1972, did not become an annual event till 2012, before which it was biennial.

The popularity of the Kolkata Book Fair was seminal in India being nominated the Guest of Honour at the Frankfurt Book Fair in 2006, according to the Frankfurt Book Fair organizers. The book fair has been celebrated in theatre, literature, songs and limericks in Kolkata.

The 44th International Kolkata Book Fair took place between 29 January and 9 February 2020 at the Central Park, Bidhannagar.

The 45th edition was postponed due to the COVID-19 pandemic.

The 45th International Kolkata Book Fair took place between 28 February 2022 and 13 march at the Central Park, Bidhannagar. The theme was Bangladesh.

The 48th International Kolkata Book Fair took place between 28 January and 9 February 2025 at the Boimela Prangan Karunamoyee, Salt Lake. Timing for 48th International Kolkata Book Fair is Daily 12 pm to 8 pm. The theme for 2025 is Germany.

== Inception ==
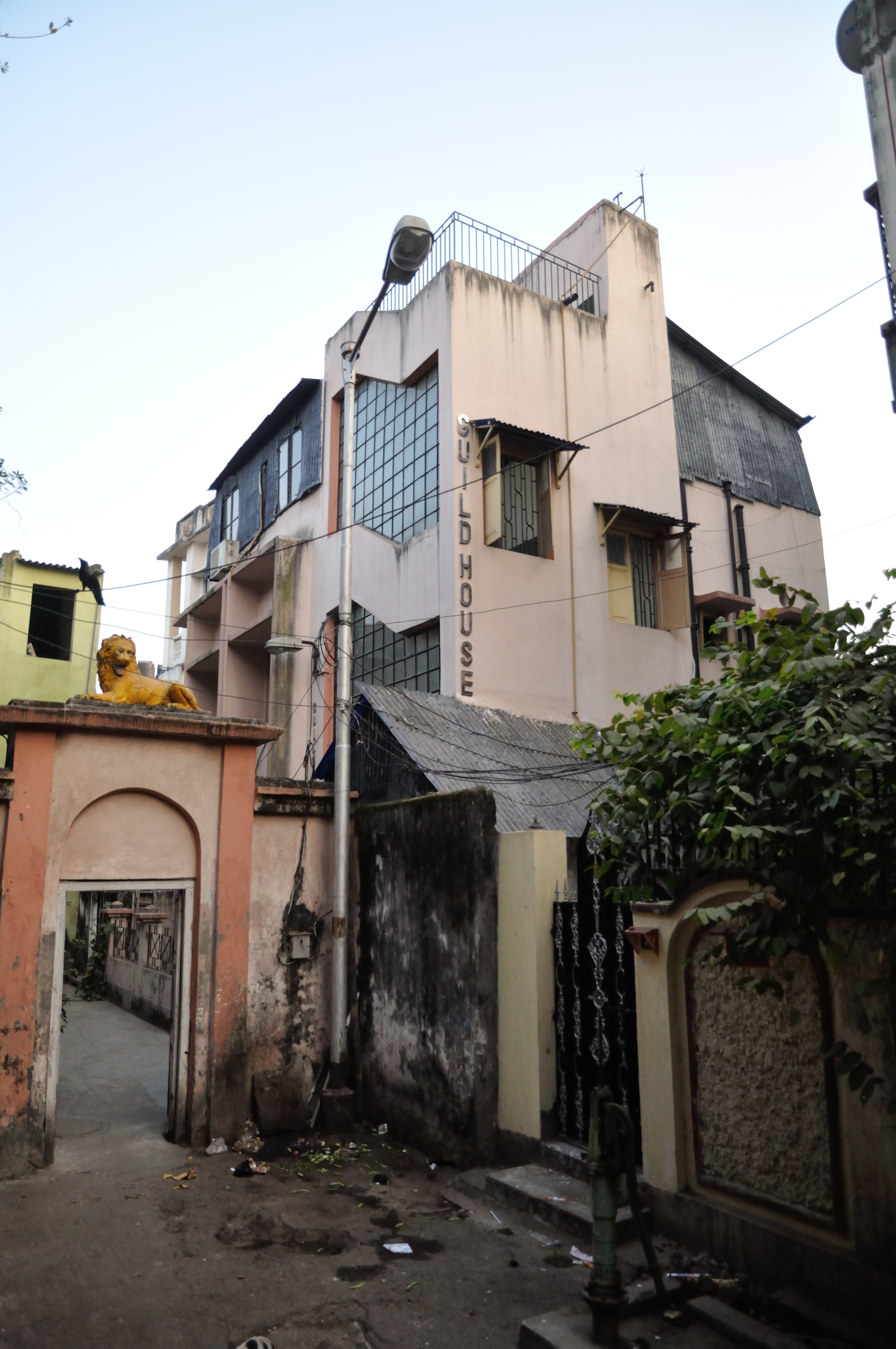
'Guild House' is the office of 'The Publishers & Booksellers Guild', Kolkata. Jan. 2014

The book fair was started on a small scale in 1976 by the Kolkata Publishers and Booksellers Guild. The book fair was started to meet the growing public demand for books.

== Duration ==
The 44th International Kolkata Book fair 2020 started on 29 January 2020 and ended on 9 February 2020. It was to be around a week-long event but popular demand forced authorities to extend the duration. Even though there is usually an extended holiday in Calcutta during the period of 23 January (Subhas Chandra Bose's birthday) to 26 January (Republic Day of India), the fair is held at the beginning of February to overlap with the payday of most Kolkatans.

The fair typically overlaps with the Hindu festival of Saraswati Puja. Saraswati is the Goddess of Learning, and hence many Hindu households observe the day by worshiping books on that day and not touching books for any other purpose. This practice causes a lower footfall on the corresponding day in the book fair.

== Venue ==
Since year 2009, the fair has been held in its new location at Milan Mela near Science City on E.M. Bypass. The initial apprehension about reduced attendance at the new site has been proven wrong. Millions visited the book fair in 2009.

The fair used to be held on the Maidan, Asia's large urban park. It was being held at the Park Street end of the Maidan, due to a better road and rail network, having moved there from the other end of Maidan in 1991.

During the 1980s and early 1990s, Kolkata played host to two annual book fairs, one by the Kolkata Publishers and Booksellers Guild, and one by the Government of West Bengal − the Grontho Mela ('Grontho' is archaic Bengali word for book). 'Grontho Mela' was held from late December until early January and was the showcase for books published by Government-run publishing houses. While this was initially a rival commercial venture, the unprecedented growth of the 'Kolkata Book Fair' caused the Government of West Bengal to merge the two book fairs in 1992.

Conservation problems for the Victoria Memorial include high dust pollution, which is often accentuated by public fairs on the Maidan. The Kolkata High Court's 2004 decision to move all public fairs to the Eastern Metropolitan Bypass has not been greeted with enthusiasm by fair organizers due to the present location being in the heart of Kolkata, and being very well serviced by public transport. The book fair and a few other fairs, however, were granted special permission by the Kolkata High Court to continue holding the fair on the Maidan in 2005 and 2006. However, the choice of Maidan as the annual venue for the book fair is no longer certain.

A demand for a permanent round-the-year indoor space for the fair, comprising only some of the stalls, had been given by the fair authorities to the Government of West Bengal. The former Chief Minister of West Bengal, Mr. Buddhadeb Bhattacharya, in a statement in 2005, had agreed to this request but no progress has been made on this front.

However, many Kolkatans feel that the fair will lose its ambience if it is held indoors or away from the Maidan, which is a vast stretch of green in the heart of the city. After a yearlong uncertainty, the world's largest non-trade book fair, settled for Park Circus Maidan to host the literary carnival in 2008.

However, organisers of Asia's biggest book fair remained apprehensive, keeping in mind the disgrace in January 2007 when the Kolkata High Court did not allow them to host the fair at the Maidan on environmental grounds. The Publishers and Booksellers Guild had to shift the most-awaited cultural event to Milan Mela ground near Science City in 2007 after the city's green brigade won a legal battle to block the fair at the Maidan. The fair took place over there annually from 2007 to 2017.From 2018 onwards, The fair takes place in Salt Lake Karunamoyee grounds.

== Kolkata Book Fair 2023 ==
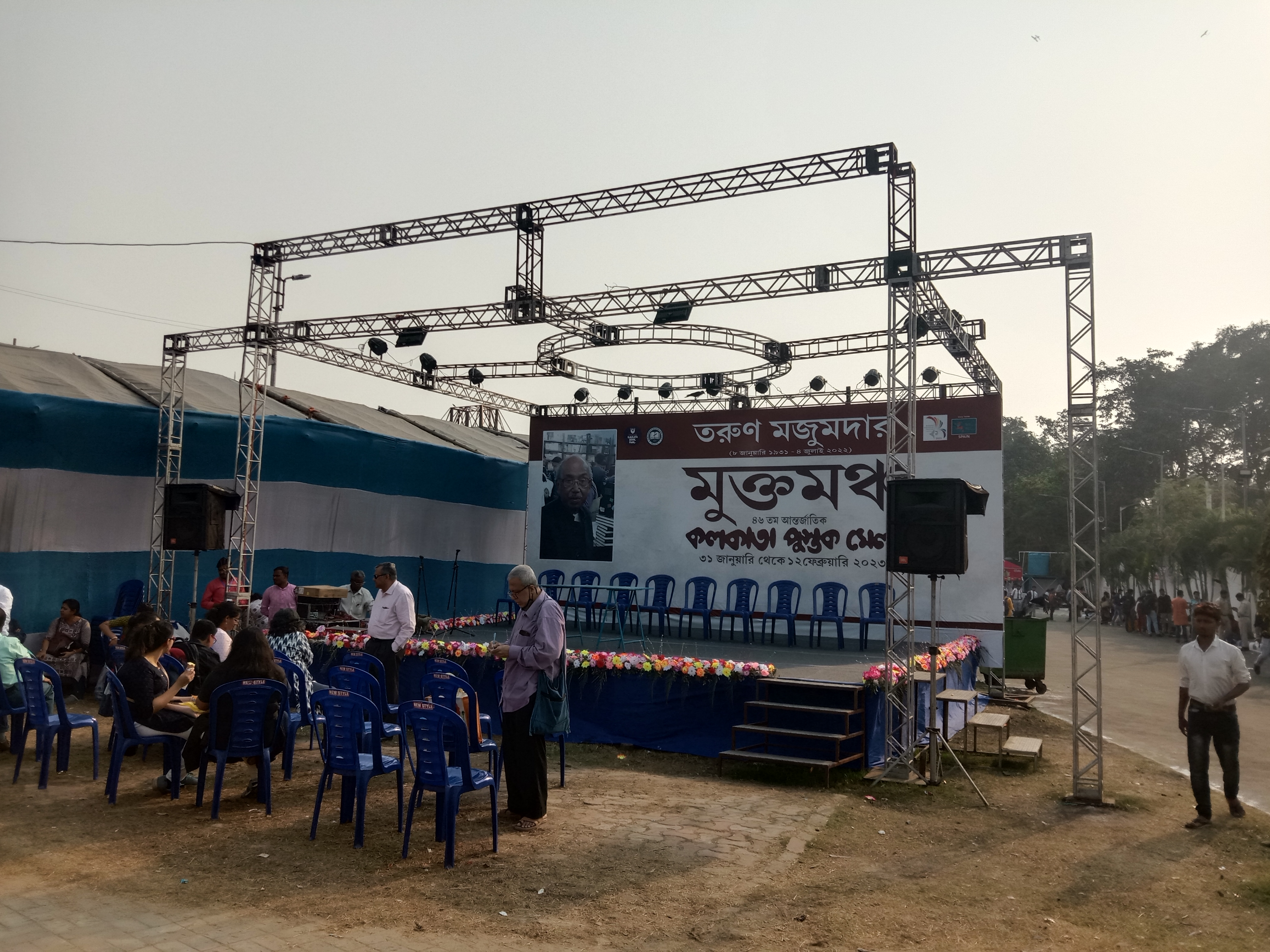
"Muktamancha" in memory of Bengali filmmaker Tarun Majumdar, installed at the 46th International Kolkata Book Fair in Karunamoyee, Salt Lake City, West Bengal, India, February 2023.

== Kolkata Book Fair 2022 ==
The 45th International Kolkata Book fair held from 28 February to 13 March at Salt Lake, Central Park. Bangladesh is the theme country for Book Fair 2022. Mamata Banerjee, Chief Minister of West Bengal and Bangladesh State Minister for Cultural Affairs, K. M. Khalid inaugurated the fair. In this occasion Banerjee renamed the ground as Boimela Prangon. The 45th Book fair was postponed from 2 years due to the COVID-19 pandemic.

== Kolkata Book Fair 2021 ==
The International Kolkata Book fair which was supposed to be held in January–February 2021, was cancelled due to COVID-19 pandemic.

== Kolkata Book Fair 2020 ==
The 44th International Kolkata Book fair was held from 29 January to 9 February. Russia was the theme country for IKBF 2020, with the Russia Pavilion hosting sessions by various Russian authors and speakers. The owl 'Tito' was adopted as the mascot for the Kolkata Book Fair 2020.

== Kolkata Book Fair 2019 ==
The 43rd International Kolkata Book Fair was held from 31 January to 11 February 2019. The book fair was inaugurated by Hon'ble Chief Minister of West Bengal Mamata Banerjee and other distinguished writers were present on the dais as Morales declared the fair open by striking the customary gong at the new venue Central Park ground in Salt Lake. Due to undergoing construction the venue was shifted from Milan Mela ground to Salt lake Central Park. Visitors were allowed from 12 noon to 8 pm every day.

According to an organizer of the event, English books are seen as a status symbol, and are sometimes carried by people who do not even know English. Sometimes parents will encourage their children to read books in English, rather than their native language.

The theme country for IKBF 2019 was Guatemala. Keeping the theme in mind the two main gates showcased Guatemala architecture.

== Kolkata Book Fair 2018 ==
The 42nd International Kolkata Book Fair was held from 30 January to 11 February 2018. The opening ceremony was done with the students of AIS(Adamas International School) The focal theme was France. The book fair was inaugurated by Honorable Chief Minister of West Bengal, Smt. Mamata Banerjee, in the presence of Special Guest Ms. Francoise Nyssen, Hon'ble Minister of Culture & Communication, France.

== Kolkata Book Fair 2017 ==
The 41st International Kolkata Book Fair was held from 25 January – 5 February 2017. The focal theme was Costa Rica. The book fair was inaugurated by Honorable Chief Minister of West Bengal, Smt. Mamata Banerjee.

== Kolkata Book Fair 2016 ==
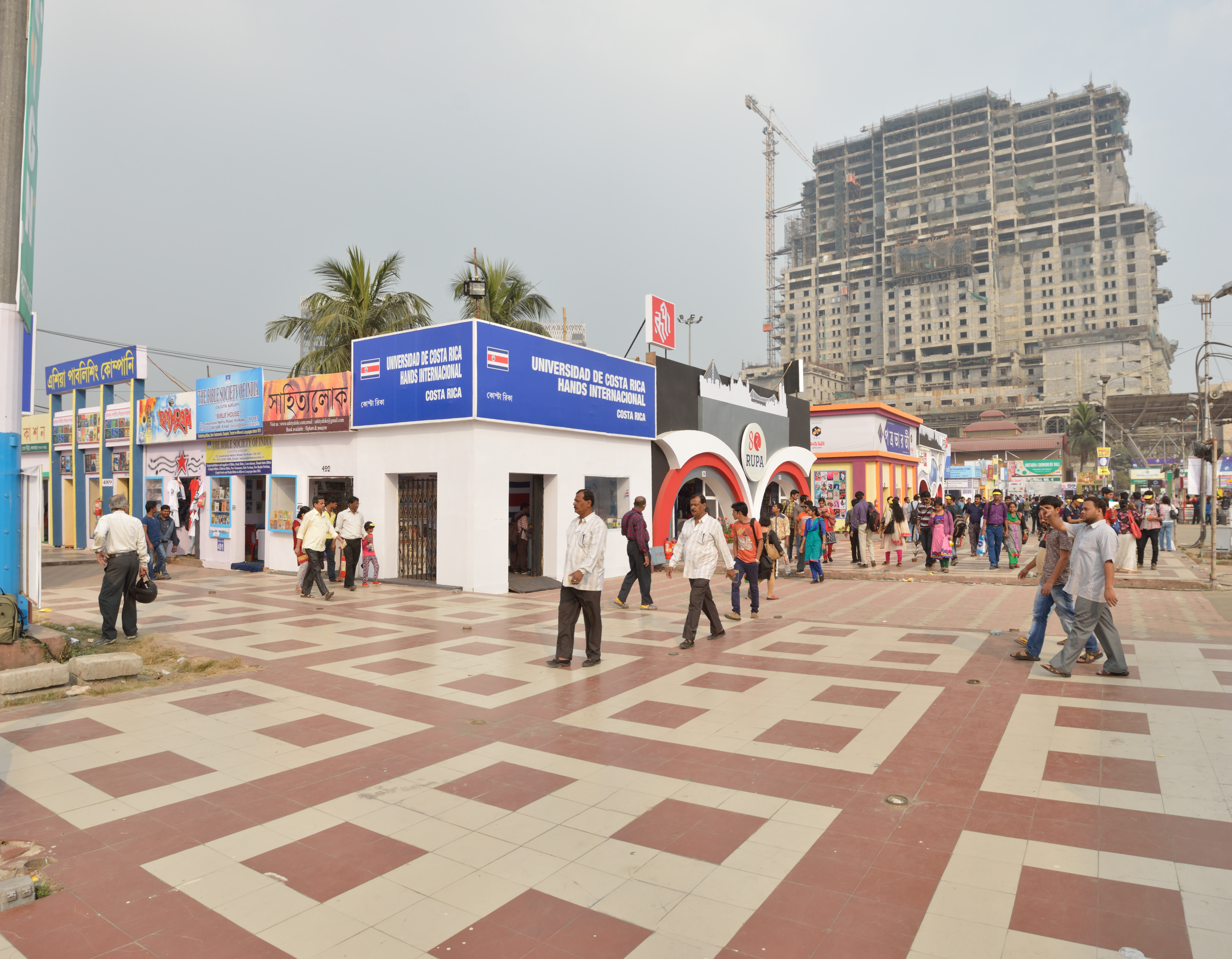
40th International Kolkata Book Fair at Milan Mela fairground.

The 40th International Kolkata Book Fair was held from 27 January to 7 February 2016. Bolivia was the Focal Theme Country in 2016. The year which is coincidentally the 50th year of Che Guevara's immortal struggle against imperialism in Bolivia. The book fair was inaugurated by Ms Magela Baudoin, a noted litterateur and novelist of the Focal Theme Country, Bolivia, in the presence of our Honored Chief Guest, Honorable Chief Minister of West Bengal, Smt. Mamata Banerjee and other dignitaries.

== Kolkata Book Fair 2015 ==
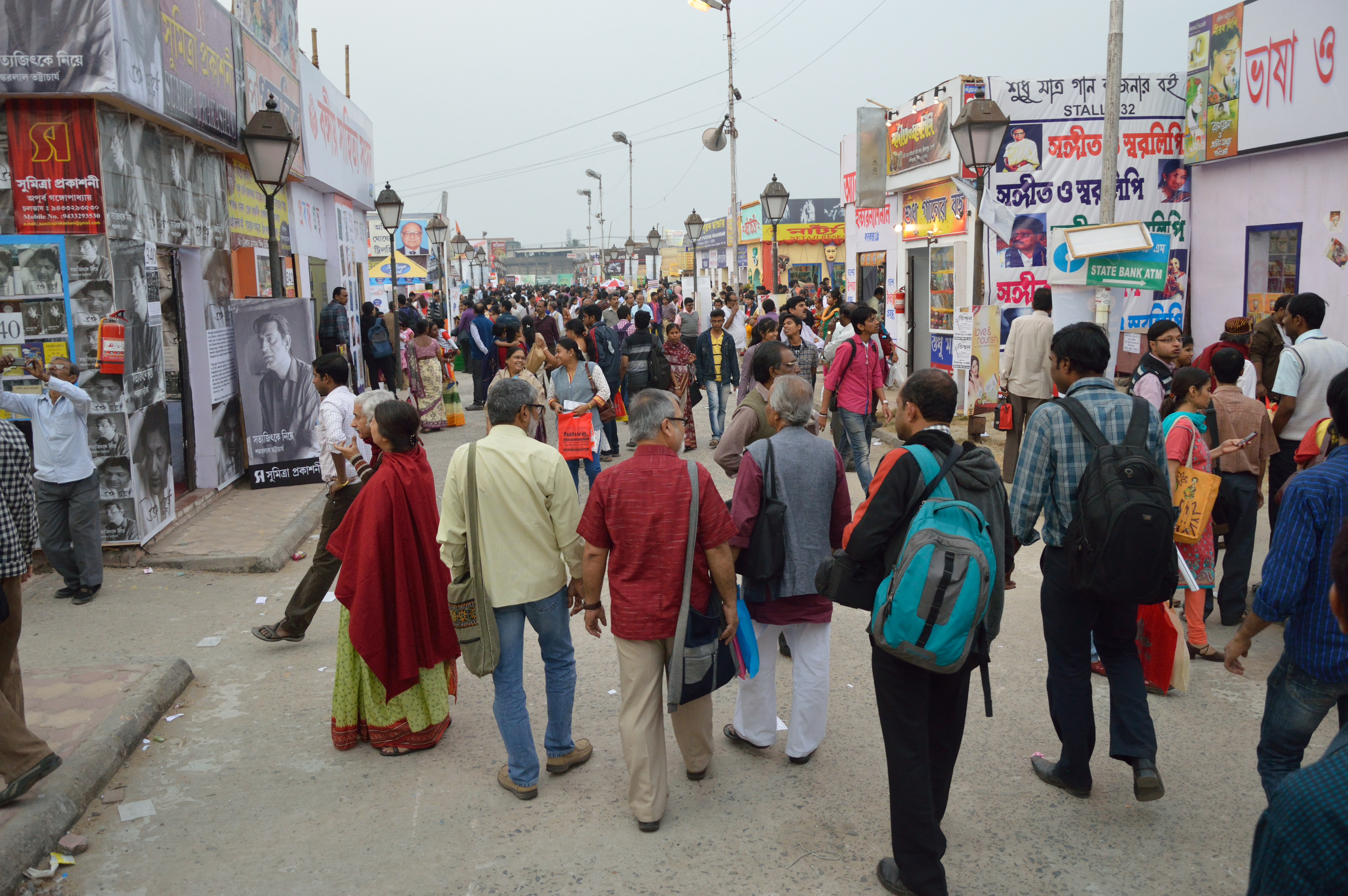
Visitors at Kolkata Book Fair 2015

The 39th International Kolkata Book Fair 2015 was inaugurated on 27 January at 4:00 pm, Tuesday by the Honorable Chief Minister of West Bengal Mamata Banarjee. The fair is held between 28 January and 8 February from 1 pm to 8 pm.

The focal theme of the 2015 fair is Great Britain.

== Kolkata Book Fair 2014 ==
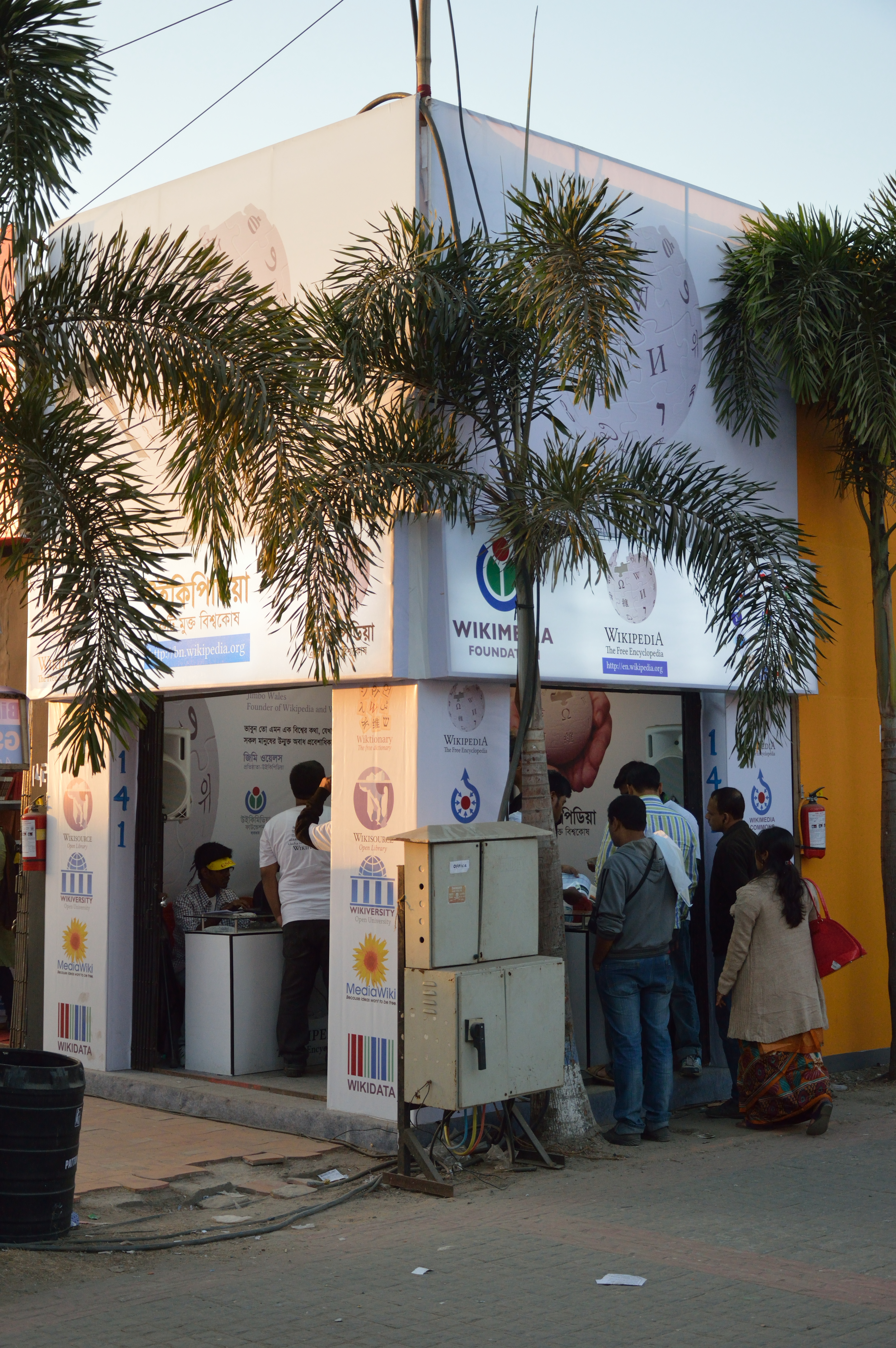
The Stall of Wikipedia first time in any bookfair for the first time worldwide.

Mamata Banerjee is inaugurating the fair by hitting the bell 38 times at Milan Mela complex, Kolkata on 28 January 2014.

The 38th International Kolkata Book Fair 2014 was inaugurated on 28 January at 4:30 pm by the Honorable Chief Minister of West Bengal Mamata Banarjee. The fair was held between 29 January and 9 February from 1PM to 8PM.

The focal theme of the 2014 fair was Peru. Wikipedia, world's largest multilingual free Internet encyclopaedia, also made its debut at the 38th International Kolkata Book Fair, where it launched a campaign "to sign up volunteers who can contribute to enrich" the Bengali language version of Wikipedia. The Book Seller and Publisher Guild introduced the Book Privilege Card in 2014 for the internet-savvy readers. A printout of the mail will serve as the Privilege Card that gives an additional 15% discount on the purchase of books worth 500 and above.

== Kolkata Book Fair 2013 ==
The 37th International Kolkata Book Fair 2013 was inaugurated on 26 January 2013 and stayed operational from 30 January to 10 February 2013. The focal theme this year was "Bangladesh". Nearly 1.9 million book lovers visited this fair. The duration of the 2013 Kolkata Book Fair was extended by three days, following a request from West Bengal Chief Minister Mamata Banerjee, to help small and medium-sized publishers. The 37th edition of the popular fair started on 26 January in the state capital instead of 29 January and ended on 10 February as scheduled earlier. The fair did a business of over Rs.20 crore. Besides the focus country of Bangladesh, Britain, the US, Italy, Vietnam, China, Israel and Costa Rica set up book pavilions at the fair. Also, Nobel laureates, writers, dramatists and musicians from various countries took part in the Kolkata Literary Meet to mark the centenary of poet-writer Rabindranath Tagore winning the Nobel Prize in Literature in 1913. Iconic Bengali writer Sunil Gangopadhyay, who died in October 2013, was remembered at the event through speeches and an award instituted in his memory.

== Kolkata Book Fair 2012 ==
The 36th International Kolkata Book Fair 2012 flagged off on 25 January 2012 and was operational till 5 February 2012. The focal theme this year was Italy. West Bengal's newly appointed Chief Minister Mamata Banerjee inaugurated the Kolkata Book Fair on 24 January 2012 at 4:30 pm. This year many fire prevention measures were taken, in consideration of recent fire incidents in Kolkata such as the AMRI Hospital tragedy.

=== Power cut ===
On Monday, 30 January 2012, in a bizarre move, the Kolkata Book Fair authorities switched off power during an interaction of Pakistan cricketer and politician Imran Khan with the media, claiming that a press meet scheduled to last for five minutes had stretched to nearly 45 minutes. According to TV footage, the Imran's address to the media ended abruptly as the power was switched off. There could have been utter chaos or security problems owing to the action of the Book Fair authorities. "We did switch off power because the next programme could not be started. So we were forced to do so," Kolkata Book Fair organizer's top official Tridib Kumar Chattopadhyay told a local TV news channel.

=== Information about 2012 Bookfair ===
36th Kolkata Book Fair 2012 was opened by the famous Italian writer Beppe Severgnini. Important personages such as Vikram Seth, Ruskin Bond and Chetan Bhagat literature were scheduled to participate in a 12-day event, as were many writers from abroad.

Kolkata Book Fair, the world's largest non-trade book fair, had also earned the distinction of being the largest book fair in Asia. "This is the third largest annual conglomeration of books after the Frankfurt Book Fair and Book Fair in London." This Year the Book Fair, with Italy as the theme country, was inaugurated in the presence of Severgnini, Chief Minister of West Bengal, Mamata Banerjee and other senior officials from the world of culture and literature. Kolkata Book Fair has become an integral part of the culture of Bengal since its inception in 1976.

The 36th Kolkata Book Fair has a number of "firsts" in her bag. Kolkata's first Literature Meet (KLM), organized by the Fair, in which famous writers such as Vikram Seth, Ruskin Bond, Chetan Bhagat, Shashi Tharoor, Mohammed Hanif, Amit Chaudhuri and Basu Kuhn were present. Bangladeshi writer Tahmima Anam, French writer Nicholas Savage, graphic novelist Nicholas Wilde, Scottish novelist, essayist and travel writer Kapka Kassabova, Canadian writer Craig Taylor, Italian writer Alessandro Baricco were also scheduled to participate.

Kolkata Book Fair 2012 was also opened by the Chief Minister on 24 January 2012. After many years, the former Chief Minister Buddhadeb Bhattacharjee was not part of the event, which is close to his heart. This is the first time that a book fair was inaugurated in the presence of a Woman Chief Minister.

Another novelty was the musical performance at the opening ceremony, while signing the song performed by Kaushiki Desikan and Monali Thakur, Shantanu Moitra in presence of enthusiastic audience. A concert with emphasis on the effects of the composition of Rabindra Nath Tagore's foreign songs provided a melodic end to the program.

Directions to the 2012 fair: Milan Mela Complex, near Science City on E.M. Bypass, Kolkata. Those who want to know the route to follow Book Fair 2012 at Milan Mela are hereby informed that they can take Train route to Bidhannagar Station & from there may take Taxi or Buses towards Science City. The West Bengal Government will run extra buses from different locations of Kolkata to Milan Mela Kolkata Book Fair 2012 Venue at different timings daily.

== Kolkata Book Fair 2011 ==
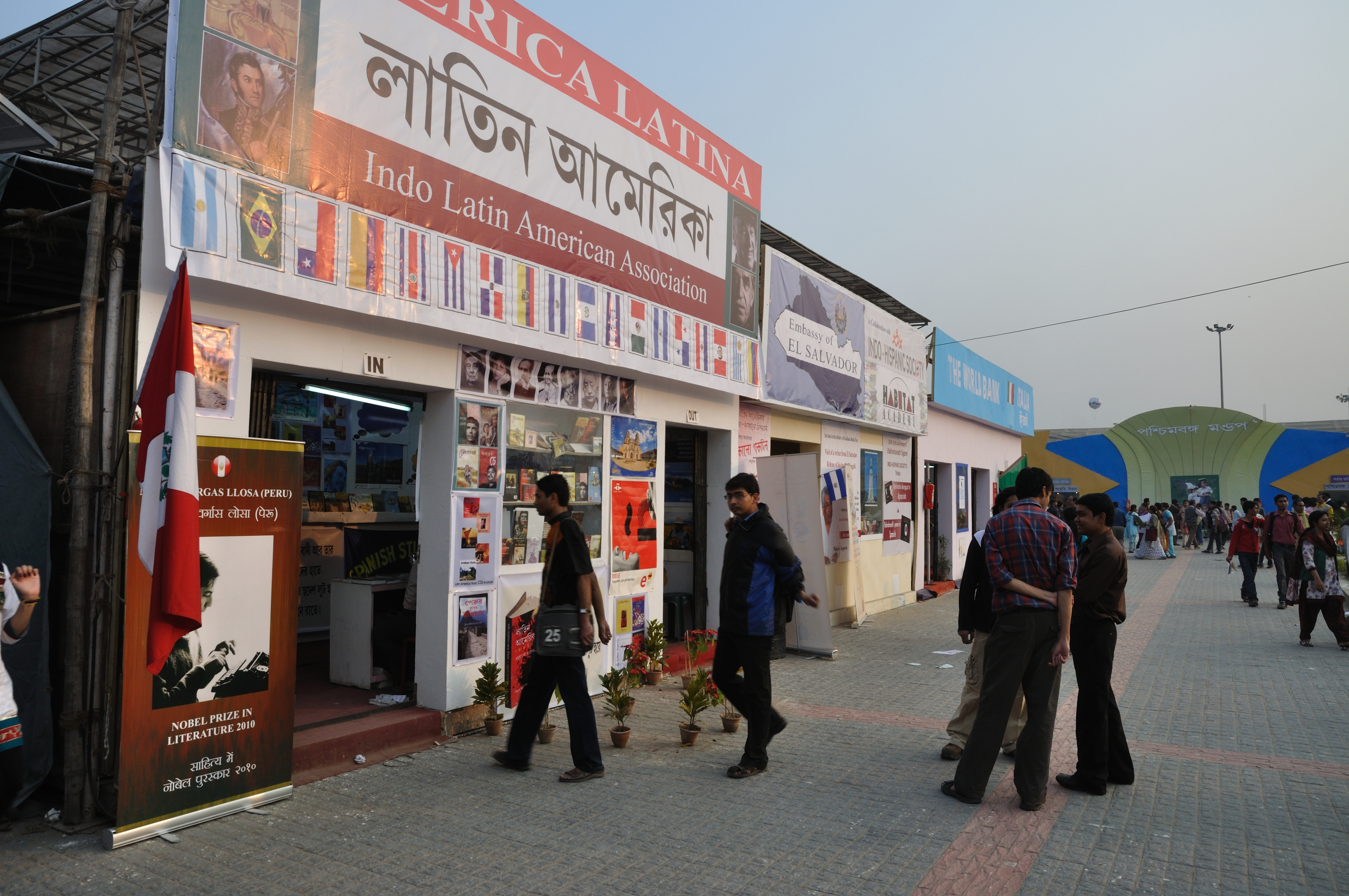
Latin America Stall

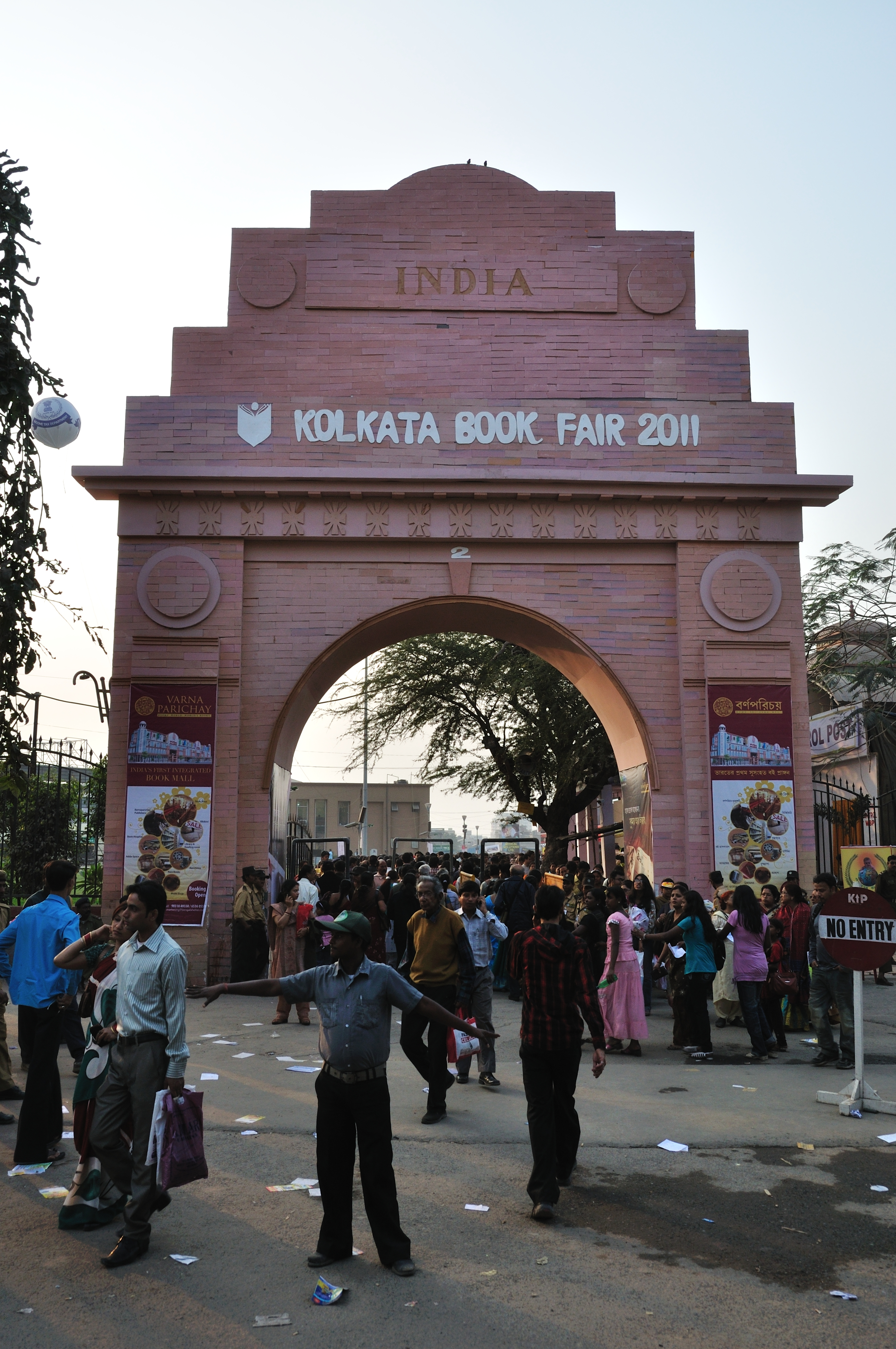
2011 book fair gate

Almost 1.7 million book lovers visited in 12 days in the 35th International Kolkata Book Fair. It was again held at Milan Mela, next to Science City, EM Bypass. Organized by the Publishers & Booksellers Guild, the 35th edition of the International Kolkata Book Fair 2011 was successfully held from 26 January to 6 February 2011. This year's fair was not only international but also carried an important historical significance. This year, on the occasion of the 150th birth anniversary of the Nobel Laureate immortal poet Rabindranath Tagore to whose memory the Fair had been dedicated, there was no entry fee for the visitors. Each and every book lover visiting the fair was given a pocket calendar with a photograph of Rabindranath Tagore as a memento. Over 1.6 million book lovers gathered in this 12-day book festival, and books worth Rs 16 crore were sold.

Noted Pulitzer Award-winning writer Richard Ford of US inaugurated the fair. The ex chief minister of West Bengal, Buddhadeb Bhattacharjee was the chief guest while the guest of honour was the noted author Atin Bandyopadhyay. The special guest was the ambassador of US to India, Timothy J. Roemer.

This was the first time that the Little Magazine Publishers in Little Magazine enclave had been given space at a prime position in the fairground free of cost. Another first was the solar lighting on the fairground. Solar battery-operated vehicles were provided for the benefit of the aged and the disabled visitors to the fair.

The five halls in the fairground had been named after Acharya Prafulla Chandra, Debabrata Biswas, Shantideb Ghosh, Mother Teresa and Suchitra Mitra. Separate zones set up for the convenience of the discerning readers included religious literature zones, universities and educational institution zones, and Hindi and neighbouring literature zones.

Talk shows centered around Rabindranath—AAMAR RABINDRANATH (Tagore in my life) were a major crowd puller. Celebrities from the fields of cinema, music, dance, drama, painting and literature spoke about the influence of the poet in their lives. Among the celebrities present were Ranjit Mallick, Swagatalakshmi, Mamatashankar, Lopamudra, Goutam Ghose, Chaiti Ghoshal, Anindita Kazi and Sunil Ganguly, Sirshendu, Samares, Suchitra Bhattacharya and others. Apart from these seminars, International Kolkata Book Fair 2011 had three international lectures: the Asoke Sarkar Memorial Lecture delivered by Richard Ford, a Pulitzer Prize winning American novelist, the Supriya Sarkar Memorial Lecture delivered by American scientist and bestselling author Mani Bhaumik, and the Sushil Mukherjea Memorial Lecture delivered by the noted author Akhil Sharma, US. A three-dimensional laser show hosted by US was held each evening in the Fairground where glimpses of American culture were displayed.

Other attractions included the Montemarte (art village) open-air auditorium, the Children's Pavilion 'CHELEBELA', and the Tagore Pavilion. The Theme Pavilion was a replica of the Capitol Building in Washington D.C. The Theme Gate was a replica of the Library of Congress building, US. The other gates were replicas of Jorasanko Gate, India Gate, Charminar Gate, Gateway of India and the Thakurbari Museum. The Tagore Pavilion was a replica of the Rabindranath Tagore memorial building of Bangladesh — Sahajadpur Kuthibari.

== Kolkata Book Fair 2010 ==
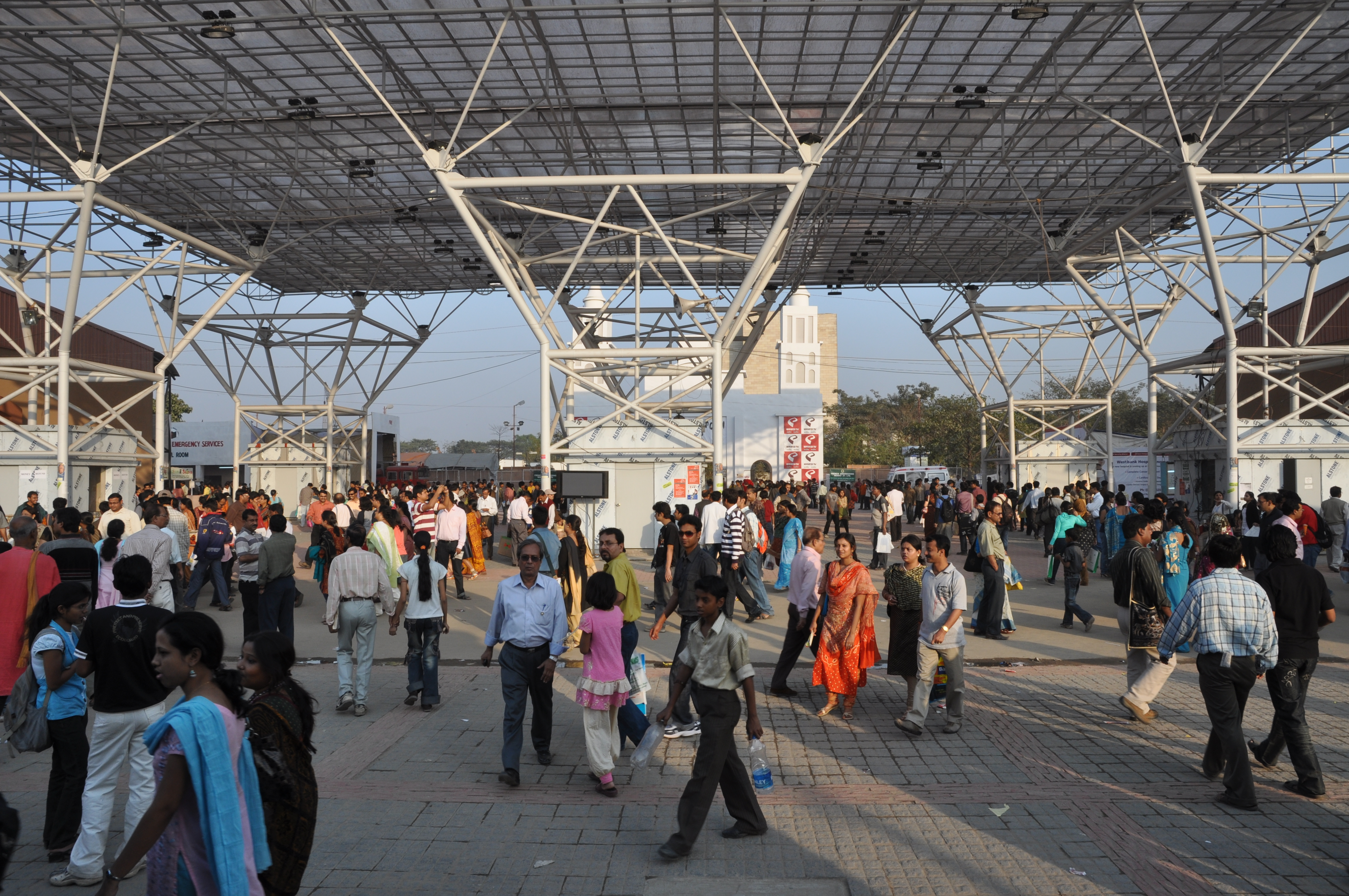
Milan Mela Ground

Mexico was selected as the focal theme and partner country for the 2010 Book Fair.

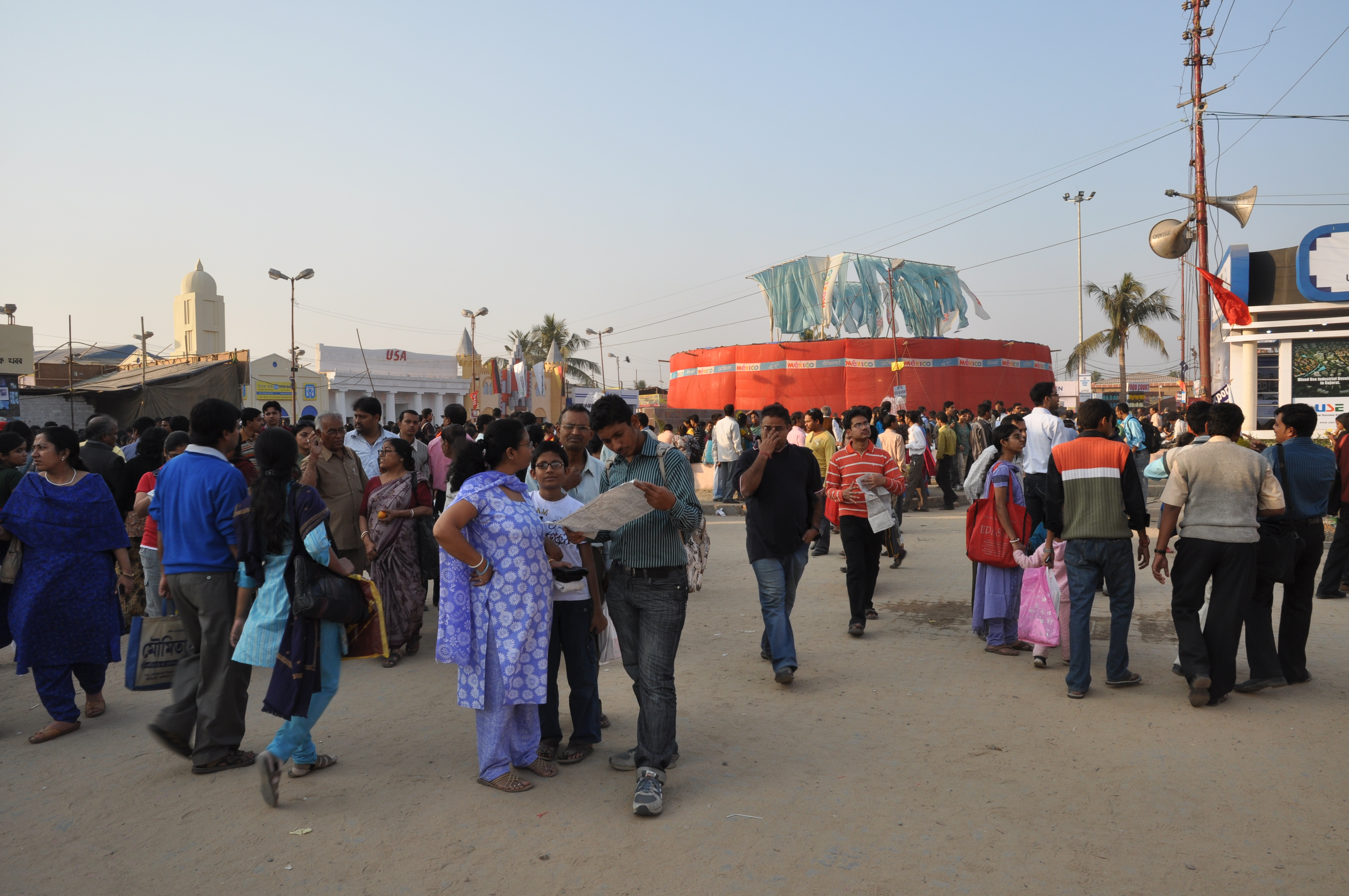
Milan Mela Ground

The 34th International Kolkata Book Fair 2010 was held from 27 January to 7 February 2010. The Fair was inaugurated by Mr. Jorge Volpi on 25 January 2010 at 4:30 pm at Milan Mela Prangan. The Chief Guest Of Honour of 2010 Kolkata Book Fair was Buddhadeb Bhattacharjee, Honourable Chief Minister, West Bengal.

Foreign Participants : 1. Bangladesh Complex, 2. Britain, 3. France, 4. Germany, 5. The African Union, 6. Japan, 7. Spain, 8. Italy, 9. European Union, 10. Sweden, 11. Romania, 12. 14 Latin American Countries, 13. Vietnam, 14. Cuba.

Other Participating States: Andhra Pradesh, Bihar, Delhi, Gujarat, Haryana, Karnataka, Kashmir, Maharashtra, Punjab, Tamil Nadu, Tripura, Uttar Pradesh, Jharkhand.

Apart from the various large and small National and International Book Publishers, the other attractions of the Fair were an IT pavilion, a Little Magazine pavilion, some stalls of local Handicrafts and Arts and also an open area for the Foodies paved with a number of stalls of different delicious food items.

== Kolkata Book Fair 2009 ==
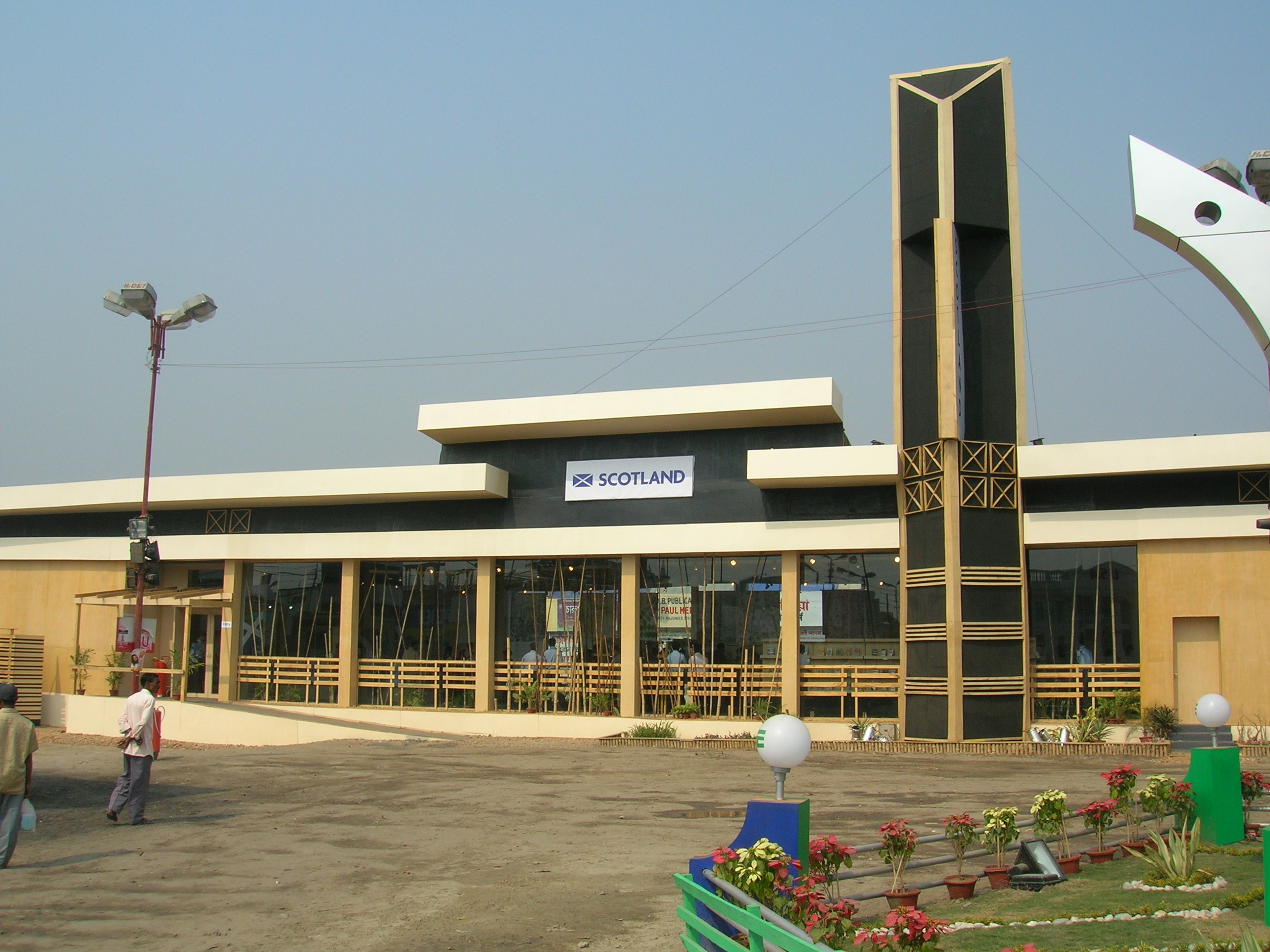
Kolkata book fair, Theme of Kolkata book fair 2009 Scotland

Scotland was selected the focal theme country for the 2009 Book Fair. It was the first time that it was held on the Milan Mela exhibition grounds. This year, for the first time, the Publishers and Booksellers' Guild released a Calcutta Book Fair Theme Song "Oi Daakchey Boi" produced by Cozmik Harmony - a partner of Washington Bangla Radio pioneering the digital era of Bengali Songs. The lyrics of "Oi Daakchey Boi" are by Sugata Guha, music by the popular percussionist Bikram Ghosh, and performed by Pratik Chowdhury, Ruprekha, Rupam Islam, Lopamudra Mitra, Srikanta Acharya, Bikram Ghosh, Shubhamita, Pulak and Rupankar Bagchi.

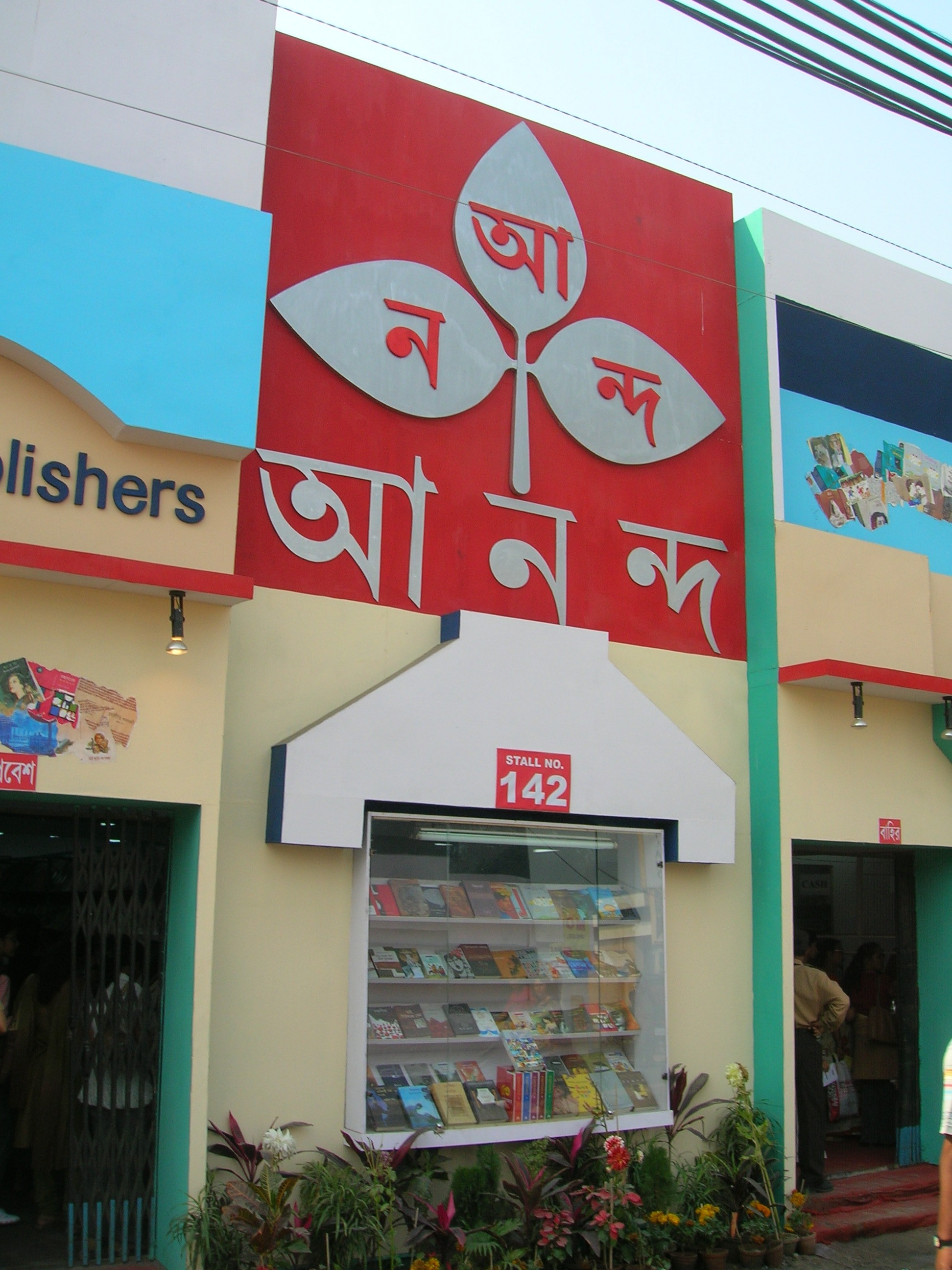
Ananda publishers

== Kolkata Book Fair 2008 ==
The United States was elected as the focal theme country for the 2008 Book Fair and was given a pavilion to showcase its books and publishers. Also, a US-Kolkata Literary Exchange (USKLE) has been created to organize this event with the Consulate General of the United States of America in Kolkata. The Kolkata Book Fair took place 30 January to 10 February 2008.

Pulitzer Prize–winning poet Yusef Komunyakaa led the delegation to the 2008 Kolkata Book Fair. Joining him on the board of advisers were several US poets laureate, including Rita Dove and Donald Hall.

Henry V Jardine, the United States Consul General in Kolkata said, "With the United States as the 'Theme Country' this year, the Consulate along with other organizations will work to bring a range of great programs, with prominent authors, artists, and academics. We will have a full schedule of events throughout the Fair time to highlight the life, culture, literature and arts of the United States. The Kolkata-based American Library will provide a display of some of its many books, periodicals and electronic media that are available for students, academics, or anyone wanting access to the Library's collection. Also, our office of the US Educational Foundation in India (USEFI) will conduct programs for prospective students interested in studying in the United States. USEFI has done such an impressive job over the last few years in promoting United States schools and universities that Indian students now represent the largest number of foreign students in the United States. SPAN Magazine, which is a popular source of information on the close Indo-US relationship, will also have representatives present and a display to highlight its more fascinating articles about shared Indian and American experiences."

Less than 24 hours before its inauguration, the Kolkata High Court banned the 33rd Kolkata Book Fair from being held on the Park Circus Maidan on environmental grounds. The fair was to be held from 29 January to 10 February. The court verdict was a culmination of a long-drawn battle between the environmentalists and the state on holding fairs at the Maidan, close to Victoria Memorial. In November 2003, the state had assured the court all fairs would be shifted from the Maidan and a permanent complex would come up on the Eastern Metropolitan Bypass.

== Controversy over the 2007 fair ==
The 2007 fair attracted a lot of controversy over the Kolkata High Court decision banning fairs on the Maidan. The court granted the fair special permission for the year of 2005, and permission for "one last time" in the year 2006 to be held at Maidan, which has been the venue of the fair for the last 31 years. The Kolkata Book Fair was the only fair granted special permission in 2006. Despite the two years given to the fair organizers to find alternative venues, no progress was made till 2007, mainly due to the fact that Kolkata lacks a large convention center with modern facilities. An objection on the grounds of environmental damage was raised for the 2007 fair and it has drawn protest from various independent groups like the "Save the Maidan" campaign. The High Court has forbidden the Guild to hold the fair on Maidan.

A large part of the intellectuals, authors, editors, journalists and book lovers, including Sunil Gangopadhyay, Shirshendu Mukhopadhyay, Samaresh Majumder, Suchitra Bhattacharya, Buddhadev Guha, Mrinal Sen, the Mayor of Kolkata, turned up at the Maidan venue on 31 January, the day of the inauguration of the fair, to protest the Kolkata High Court order banning the fair, and to symbolically inaugurate the Kolkata Book Fair. This was to show that the spirit of people supporting the fair cannot be killed.

In 2007 Romania participated for the first time. Romanian jazz artist Teodora Enache was present with her music.

The rescheduled Book Fair was held in Salt Lake City, a place located at the outskirts of Kolkata from 9 February up to 25 February.

With lesser space and lesser footfall, the 2007 fair was a moderate success at best.

The 2009 book fair at Milan Mela Maidan was a gala success, according to the figures published by the organizing committee. In 2010 book fair, the then Honorable Chief Minister of West Bengal Mr. Buddhadeb Bhattacharya remarked, "Some people are against the Book Fair in the name of environment." The Book Fair is sponsored by the Publishers Guild, a business forum.

== Kolkata Book Fair 2006 ==
2006 was the 32nd Kolkata Book Fair. The Court had issued an order the previous year against the holding of any fair or exhibition in the Maidan following a petition against it being converted into a venue for such occasions on grounds of environmental degradation. A bibliophile himself, Mr. Bhattacharjee took up the matter with the Defence Ministry, as the Indian Army is the custodian of the Maidan and the holding of any event there requires a no objection certificate from it.

Mr. Bhattacharjee made a similar appeal, and with success, for the 2006 Book Fair, an event that drew more than 2.5 million people and in the course of which Rs. 22 crores of books and other publications were sold, according to its organisers, the Booksellers and Publishers Guild. The Court then agreed to a one-time waiver in deference to an appeal from the State Government. Mr. Bhattacharjee had also sought the help of then Defence Minister, Pranab Mukherjee, to get the Army's nod. The latter has been approached to persuade his successor A. K. Antony to do the same. Defence sources said the Army authorities have told the Government that an NOC could not be issued without a clearance from the Court.

== Kolkata Book Fair 2005 ==
The 30th Kolkata Book Fair got underway in the City of Joy on the Republic Day at the city's Maidan from 25 January to 6 February 2005. In 2005, the fair housed about 600 stalls, including more than 20 pavilions, and recorded 13 to 14 lakh visitors every year. Kolkata Book Fair 2005 was of special significance as it was technically updated and remodeled to keep pace with international standards. Kolkata Book Fair was ranked at par with its foreign counterpart—World Book Fair, Frankfurt on the world calendar.

For the first time in the fair's history, three big players of the publishing industry -- Ananda Publishers, Mitra & Ghosh and Dey's Publishing— set-up their stalls adjacent to each other. This caused small and medium publishers some concern as they felt the three crowd pullers would tell upon the distribution of buyers in the fair.

France was the theme of 2005's fair. French writer and critic Daniel Pennac inaugurated the event. He shared the dais with West Bengal Chief Minister Buddhadev Bhattacharya.

=== Green case against Book Fair at High Court 2005 ===
An eminent environmentalist moved the Calcutta High Court claiming that preparation for the Kolkata Book Fair was leading to pollution of the Brigade Parade Ground area, considered to be the lung of the metropolis. Subhas Dutta placed before a division bench, presided by justice Asim Banerjee, 30 photographs which he claimed were proof of the digging and spoiling of the ground by contractors and workers setting up the showrooms and book fair offices. Dutta claimed trenches had been dug to place cables and to prepare service privies, affecting the environmental balance of the ground, and alleged that the State Government had not taken any action in this regard. The High Court directed early that the environmental balance of the brigade parade ground must be kept intact and the greenery maintained for the sake of the people's health. It had also directed that prior permission of the military authorities, which own the ground, was necessary before the State Government granted permission for any usage of the ground by any organisation.

=== Focus on IT in Kolkata Book Fair 2005 ===
Kolkata Book Fair 2005, held at Milan Mela Prangan, highlighted the IT and ITES aspects of the state along with the changing face of West Bengal's infrastructure and talent pool. The book fair had an information technology park (ITP) where several IT companies displayed and sold IT products relating to education, literature and other projects. On display were IT products suitable for libraries, school education and technical disciplines as well as details of courses, hardware and CDs of books. The stalls of ITES players like the Academy of Animation Arts and Technology focused on the potential of the biotech and animation sectors. One study by a global consulting firm indicated that by 2005, the Indian animation industry could be worth $1.5 billion in a global market of $5–7 billion. The Academy of Animation Arts and Technology set up an animation school to provide training on the fundamentals of animation.

The 2005 Kolkata Book Fair was held over an area of 800,000 sq ft (75,330 sq m), with a stall cover area of 200,000 sq.ft. 535 book stalls took part in the fair. Footfall recorded was over 14 lakhs. Single-day sales on the final day exceeded Rs.2 million.

== Kolkata Book Fair 2004 ==
There was enough police posted at the venue of the 29th Kolkata Book Fair to tackle any eventuality even before it was formally inaugurated on Tuesday by Chilean poet Raúl Zurita. Although lights seemed to have gotten brighter this year, the 'ground' reality remained unchanged. The handful of visitors on the inaugural day managed to raise enough dust to put a cavalry charge to shame. Chile being the theme for the fair, the inaugural ceremony had more to do with Pablo Neruda and Latin American literature than about the event itself.

== Participants ==
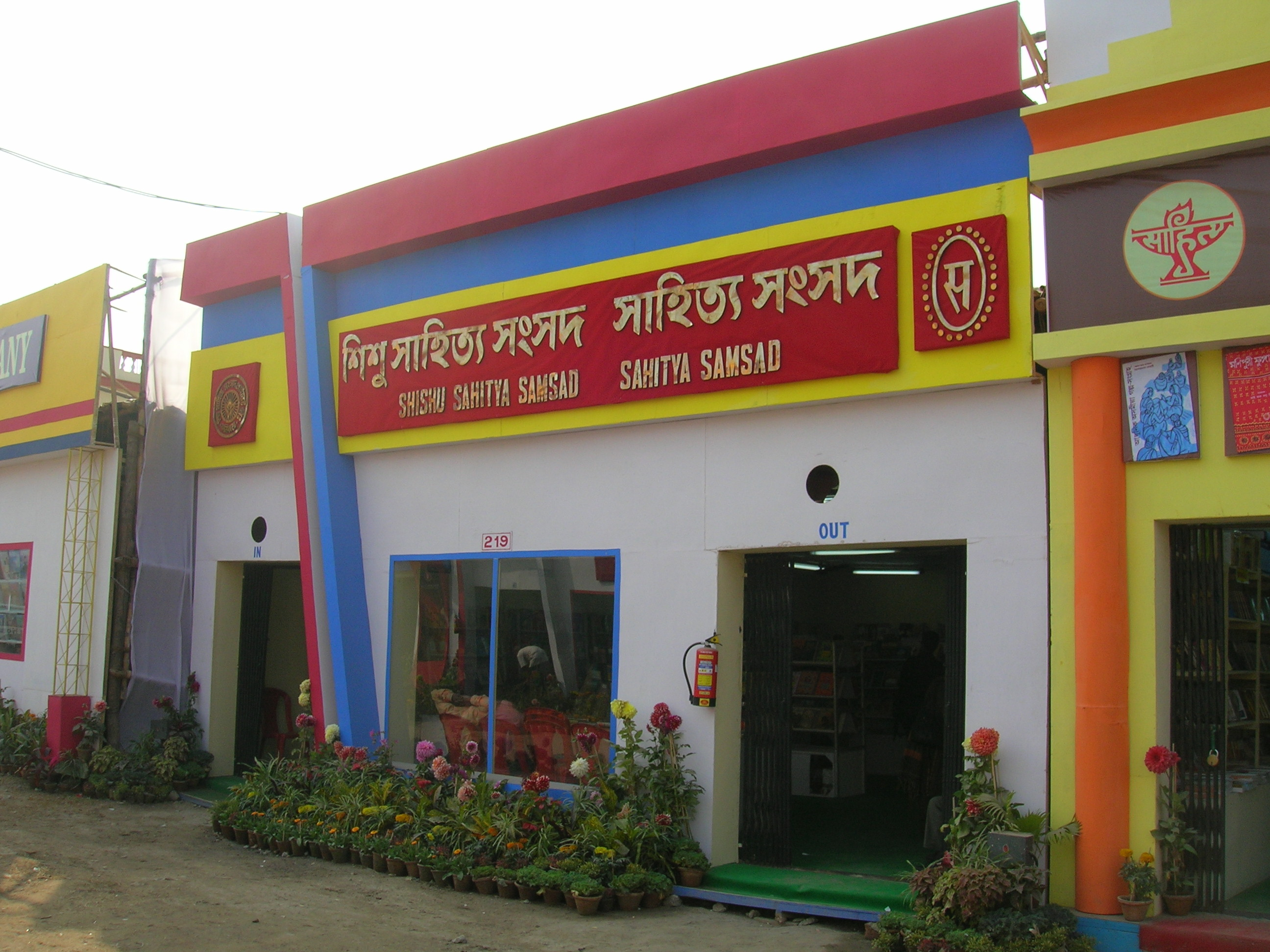
Sishu Sahitya Sansad

Most bookstalls in the book fair keep English and Bengali books. Popular book stalls include Ananda Publishers, Dey's Publishing, Deb Sahitya Kutir, and Mitra Ghosh Publishers, Pratibhas, Punashcha, Sishu Sahitya Samsad, Deep Prakashan, Tuli Kalam, Bhasha o Sahitya, Maondol Book House, Saraswato Library - among Bengali language book shops and Timely Books, Seagull Books, Rupa & Co., Penguin India, Tata Mcgraw-Hill - among English language book shops.

Virtually all major European scientific publishers or corresponding franchisees set up shop, including Oxford University Press, Cambridge University Press, Kluwer and Springer Verlag.

The fair's diplomatic mission stalls display and sell books from their countries. The British Council, United States Information Service, and Alliance française typically host stalls. The European Union, Bangladesh and several Latin American embassies have hosted stalls in recent years.

Most major news media in Calcutta have stalls, including The Statesman and The Telegraph.

Calcutta institutions, which have their own press or publishing house typically host stalls - including the Indian Museum, Asiatic Society, survey institutes like Zoological Survey of India, Botanical Survey of India, Geological Survey of India, and universities like University of Calcutta, Jadavpur University and Rabindra Bharati University.

Other notable annual stalls include:

- The famous Santiniketan-based used bookseller Subarnarekha
- A stall hosted by Kolkata artist Rathin Mitra, featuring his famous panoramas of Kolkata
- The BenFish (Bengal Fisheries) food stall, which typically attracts more customers than most bookshops

The initial rule that only publishers, and not institutions which just sold or distributed books but did not publish any books, can participate in the fair has been waved in the 2000s. This rule often forced small distributors to bring out a token publication just to be able to participate in the fair.

In 2014, Wikipedia made its first appearance at the Kolkata Book fair, launching its campaign to enthuse people to become regular contributors to its site. It booked a stall and lined up an awareness programme to sign up volunteers. Incidentally, Kolkata fares poorly when it comes to contributing to the world's biggest online encyclopedia. As of 2013, the city had only seven senior contributors and some volunteers. Wikipedia needs people from Kolkata to contribute voluntarily not only to the mother website but also to its Bengali language version of Wikipedia. The Book Fair authorities have already sealed the deal and are looking forward to this heavyweight participant.

== Themes ==
Starting from the 1990s, the book fair has been themed annually, typically on a country - on the lines of the Guest of Honour at the Frankfurt Book Fair. The theme country embassy is typically given a stall at the fairground centre, and many book shops theme their collections based on the fair theme. The temporary gates of the fair are designed according to the theme, on the basis of a design competition among Kolkata students.

Year	Theme
1991	Assam
1992	Tripura
1993	Odisha
1994	Zimbabwe
1995	West Bengal
1996	Bihar
1997	France
1998	Great Britain
1999	Bangladesh
2000	Brazil
2001	India
2002	Netherlands
2003	Cuba
2004	Chile
2005	France
2006	Spain
2007	Australia
2008	United States (**Fair Postponed)
2009	Scotland
2010	Mexico
2011	United States
2012	Italy
2013	Bangladesh
2014	Peru
2015	Great Britain
2016	Bolivia
2017	Costa Rica
2018	France
2019	Guatemala
2020	Russia
2021	Cancelled for COVID-19 pandemic
2022	Bangladesh
2023	Spain
2024	United Kingdom
2025	Germany
2026	Argentina

Typically, the Chief Guest at the fair is from the themed country and have been such noted dignitaries as Günter Grass and Richard Dawkins.

Starting from 2005, one of the newest participating international pavilions is named the 'guest of honour', and is a kind of secondary theme of the fair. Australia was the guest of honour for 2007.

'Italy' was declared the theme for Kolkata Book Fair 2012, by Publishers and Booksellers Guild, Kolkata.

== Dedicated enclaves ==
- All first editions of books which are released in the fair are housed in a special release gallery.
- The Book Fair has been the annual show for Bengali little magazines since the inception of the fair. The little magazines are now housed in a special dedicated section in the fair.
- From the 1990s, the Kolkata Book Fair also has a special section for budding artists, authors, poets and painters. It is called Montmartre after the Montmartre in Paris. It typically has poetry recitals, and live face sketching for patrons by upcoming artists.
- The fair also has a special children's section starting from the 2000s.
- Following the devastating fire of 1997, the food stalls have also shared a common enclave.

== Events ==
A number of events are held in conjunction with the book fair.

- A number of book signings and book releases with first edition distributions are held in conjunction with the fair, due to the high visibility of the fair
- A series of seminars and talks by literati
- Competitive events for school children like essay writing and trivia sessions
- The Walk for Books to raise money for child literacy programs
- Theme country events, including a talk by the Chief Guest
- The Asoke Kumar Sarkar Memorial Lecture, the annual lecture delivered since 1984 by noted publishers and educators like W. Bradford Wiley
- The Book Bazaar, the auction held on the last day of the fair to auction off remainder stock, has been discontinued

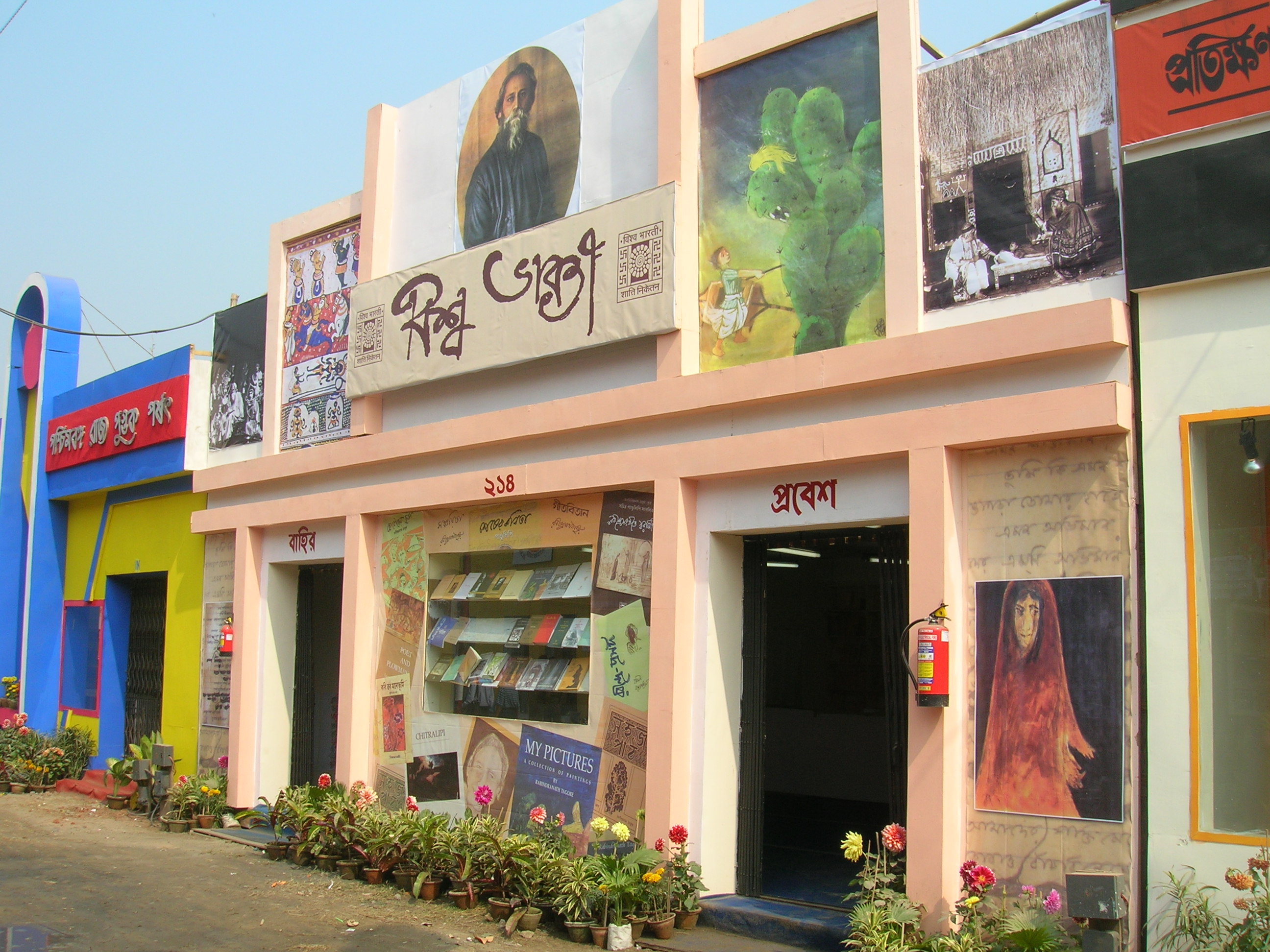
bishwabharati stall

== Propaganda ==
The Kolkata Book Fair attracts a lot of people looking for free propaganda and idea promotion. The fair does have its share of fair and useful propaganda, and relief fund raisers, along the lines of the Frankfurt Book Fair protest movement against the official German spelling reforms.

== Challenges, problems and solutions ==
The biggest problem the book fair faces are the huge crowds which visit the fair - crowd and litter control are a major issue at the fair.

An associated problem is dust pollution, and resulting dust allergy and depreciation of exhibited books due to shopsoiling. The grass is usually trodden bare in the first few days, leaving the top soil dry and prone to erosion. Watering is typically used to control the problem, but it makes the grounds muddy.

Traffic and parking problems during fair days usually make the visit steeped in logistics. Most Kolkatans prefer to use public transport like the Kolkata Metro Railway and bus service, which have extended schedules during fair days.

A large fire in 1997 destroyed over one third of the fair, burnt over 100,000 books and caused the death of a visitor (Jiten Seal), who suffered a heart attack brought on by the ensuing stampede. Stricter fire laws, construction laws, and prohibition of open flames in the fair ground were instituted in the wake of the disaster, and insurance for stall holders was made compulsory. A massive downpour in 1998 also resulted in a lot of book damage, but the insurance laws made sure that stall owners did not suffer financial damage. The popularity of the fair has continued to grow despite these two setbacks. In both cases, the fair recovered and continued after a damage repair break.

Another problem due to the huge crowds is shoplifting. Typically, every stall has its own security - who control traffic flow into the stall. Such measures often lead to long and winding queues in front of the more popular stalls.

== Inaugurations ==
A renowned person inaugurates the Kolkata Book Fair each year.

Year	Inaugurated By
1976	Debdoot Sheet
1977	Mrityunjoy Bandhopadhyay
1978	Suniti Kumar Chatterji
1979	Tushar Kanti Ghosh
1980	Bhabatosh Dutta
1981	Amartya Sen
1982	Pratul Chandra Gupta
1983	Devipada Bhattacharya
1984	Mulk Raj Anand
1985	Ramaranjan Mukherji
1986	Nurul Hasan
1987	Asin Dasgupta
1988	Raja Ramanna
1989	Andre Lewin
1990	Asima Chatterjee
1991	Basanti Dulal Nagchaudhuri
1992	Amlan Dutta
1993	Mrinal Sen
1994	U. R. Ananthamurthy
1995	Raghunath Reddy
1996	Tapan Raychaudhuri
1997	Jacques Derrida
1998	Alen Gnra
1999	Shamsur Rahman
2000	Chintamoni Kar
2001	Pere Vesien
2002	Rita Rahaman
2003	Luis Toledo Sande
2004	Raúl Zurita
2005	Daniel Pennac
2006	Maria Fernando Santiago
2007	Thomas Keneally
2008	Paul Theroux
2009	Alexander McCall Smith
2010	Jorge Volpi
2011	Richard Ford
2012	Beppe Severgnini
2013	Anisuzzaman
2014	Mamata Banerjee
2015	Anita Anand
2016	Magela Baudoin
2017	Mamata Banerjee
2018	Mamata Banerjee
2019	Mamata Banerjee
2020	Mamata Banerjee
2022	Mamata Banerjee and K. M. Khalid
2023	Mamata Banerjee
2024	Mamata Banerjee
2025	Mamata Banerjee

== Picture gallery ==
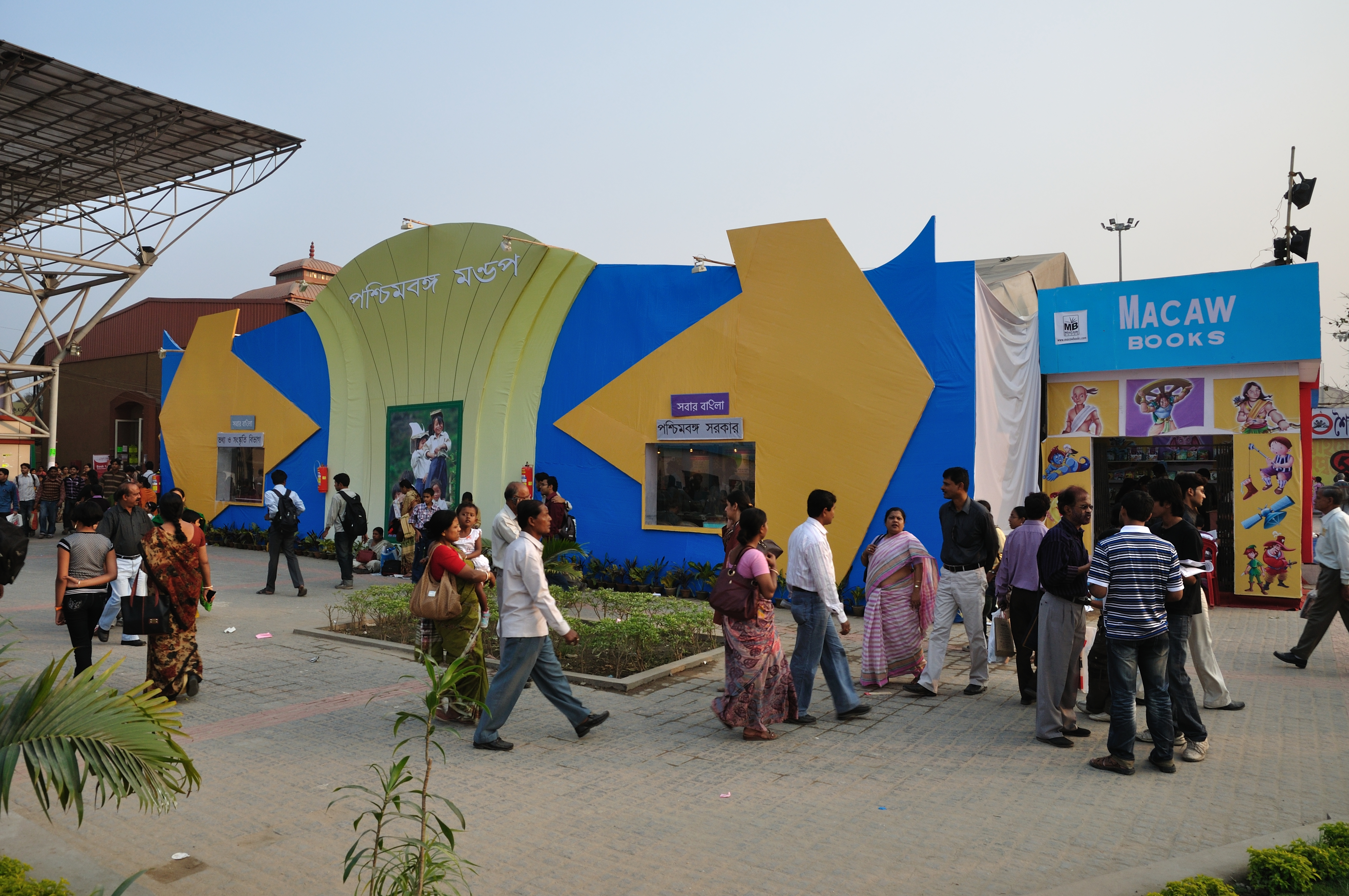
2011 kolkata book fair

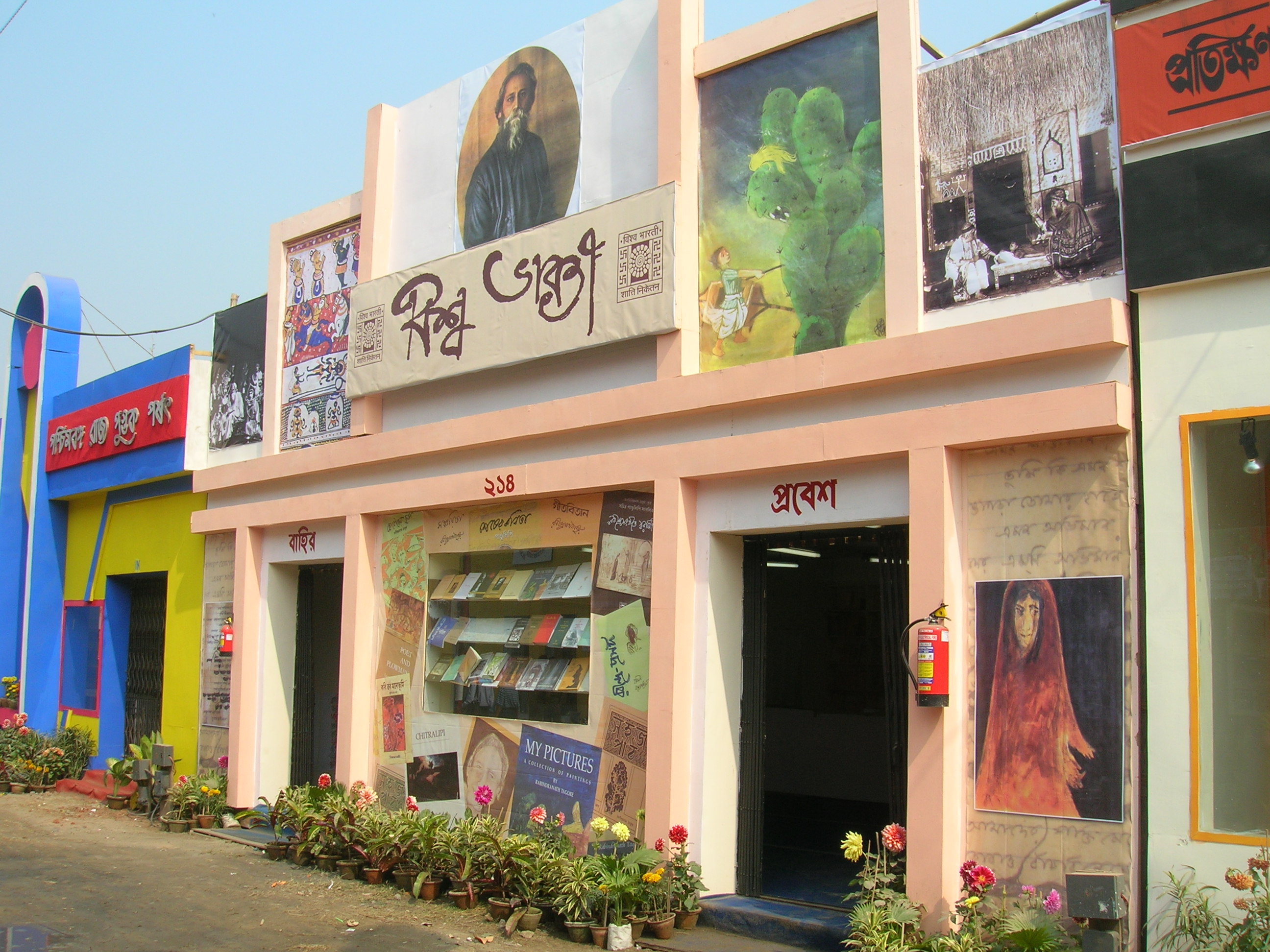
Kolkata Book Fair, theme Bangladesh

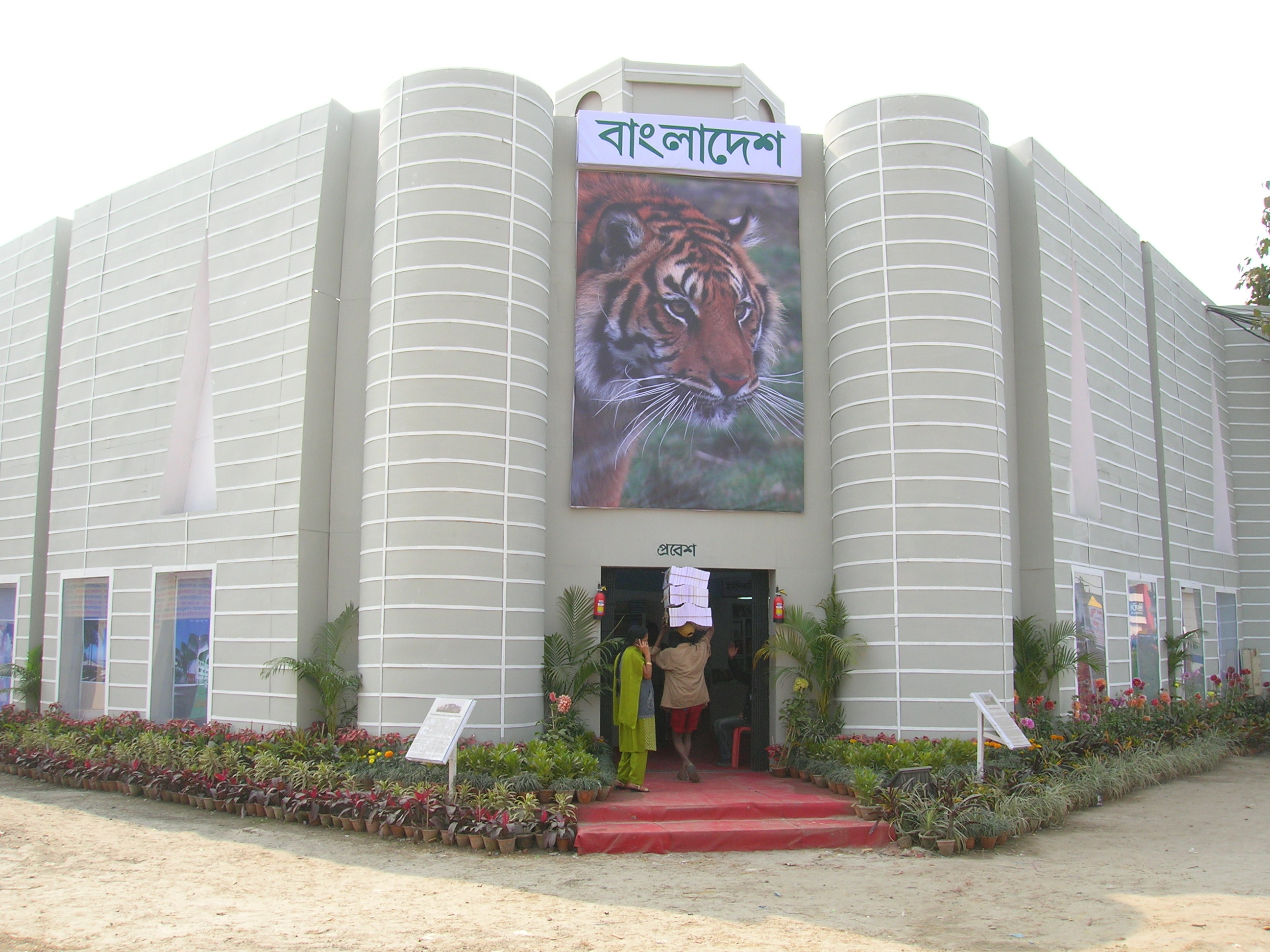
Kolkata Book Fair 2009, Bangladesh Pavilion

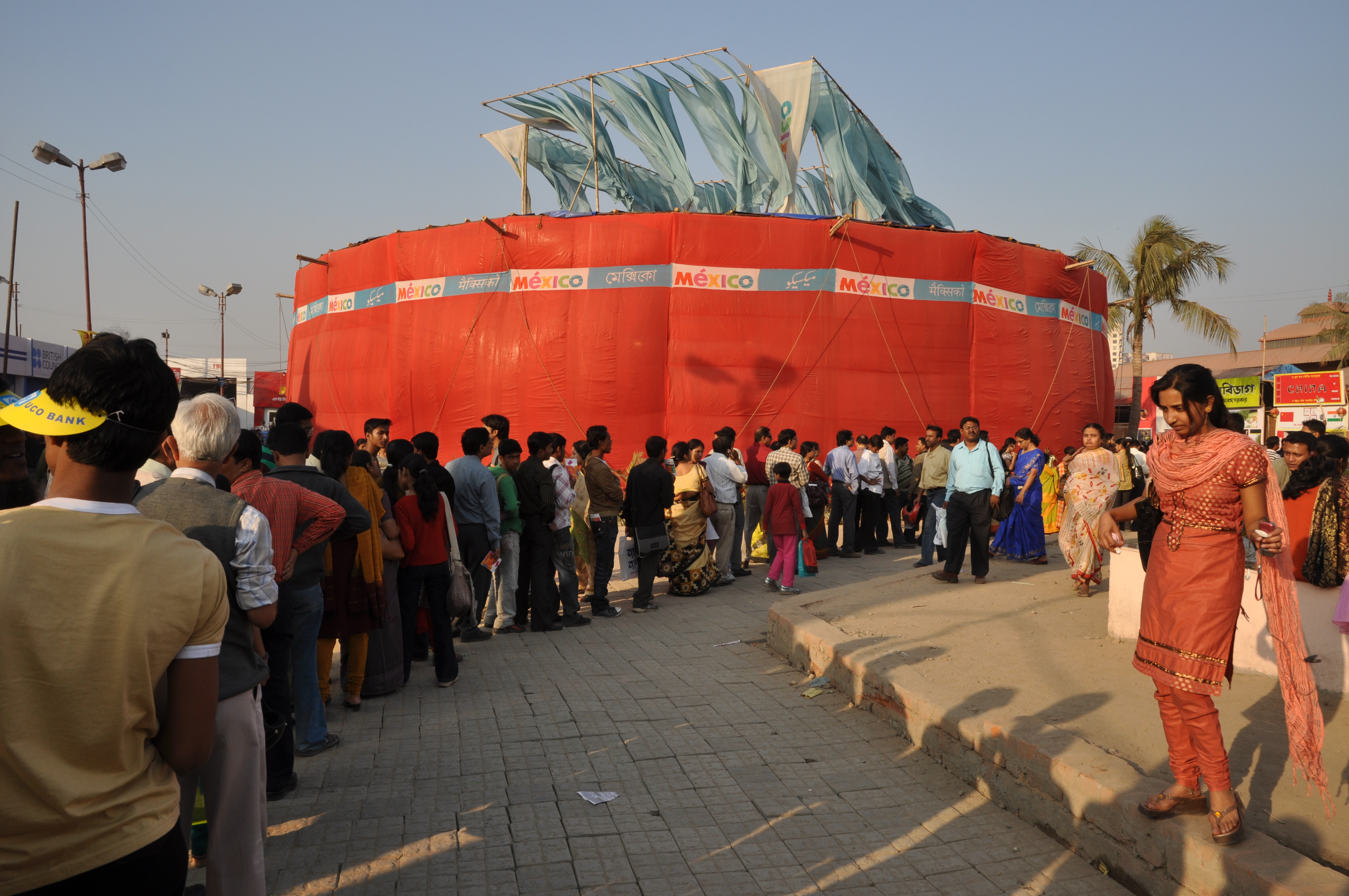
Kolkata Book Fair 2010, Mexico Pavilion

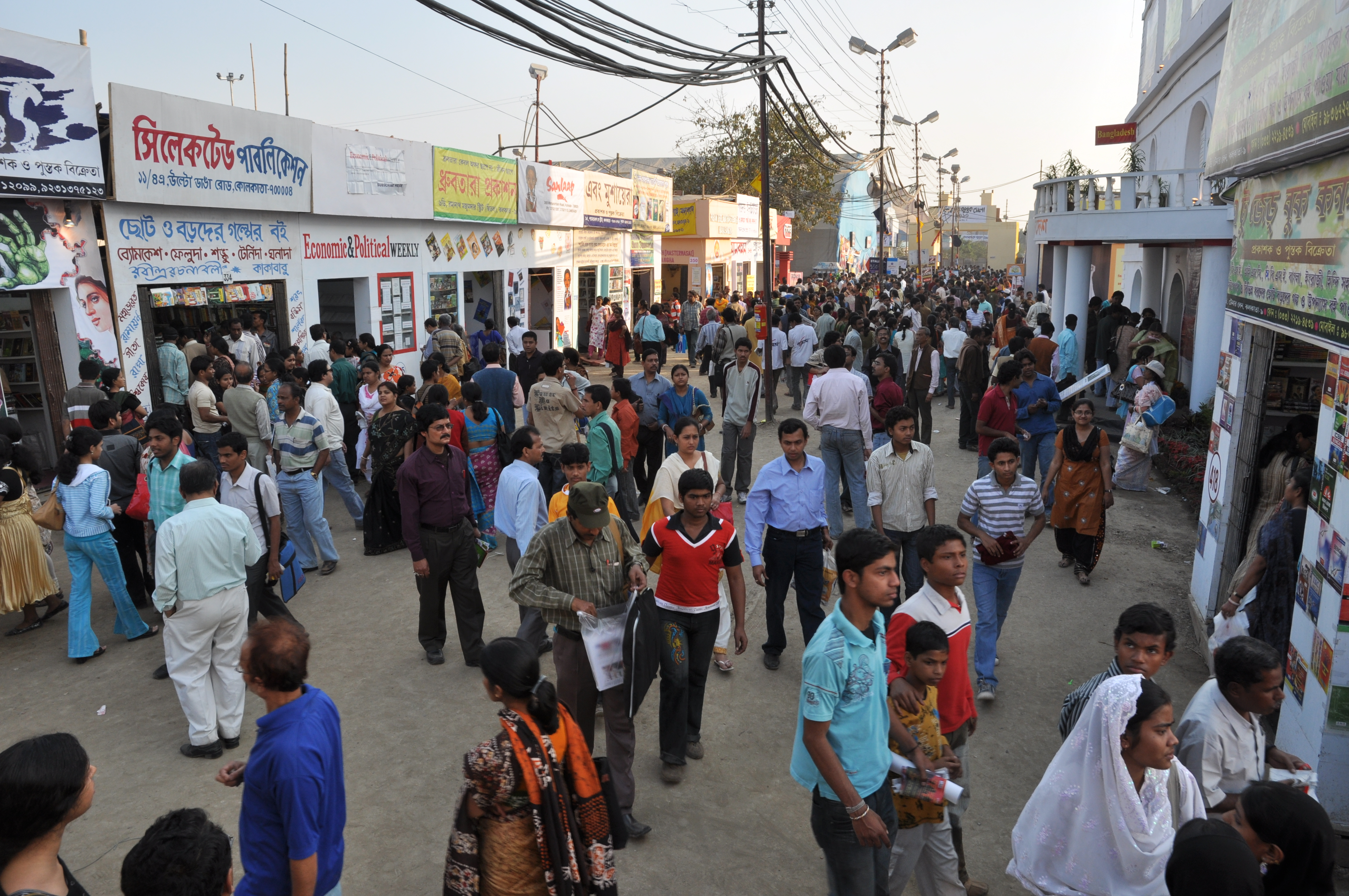
Kolkata Book Fair 2010

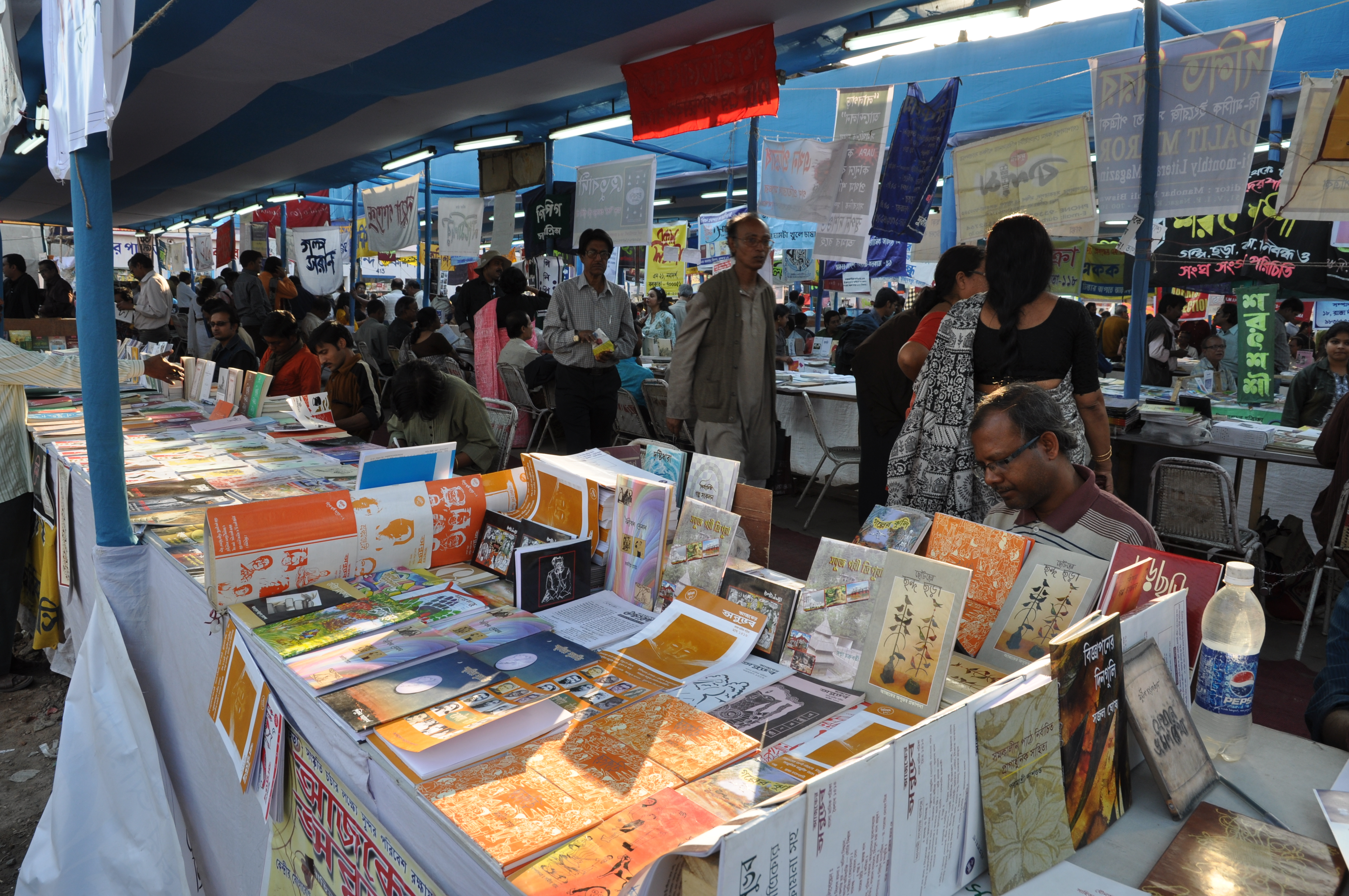
Kolkata Book Fair 2010, Little Magazines Stalls

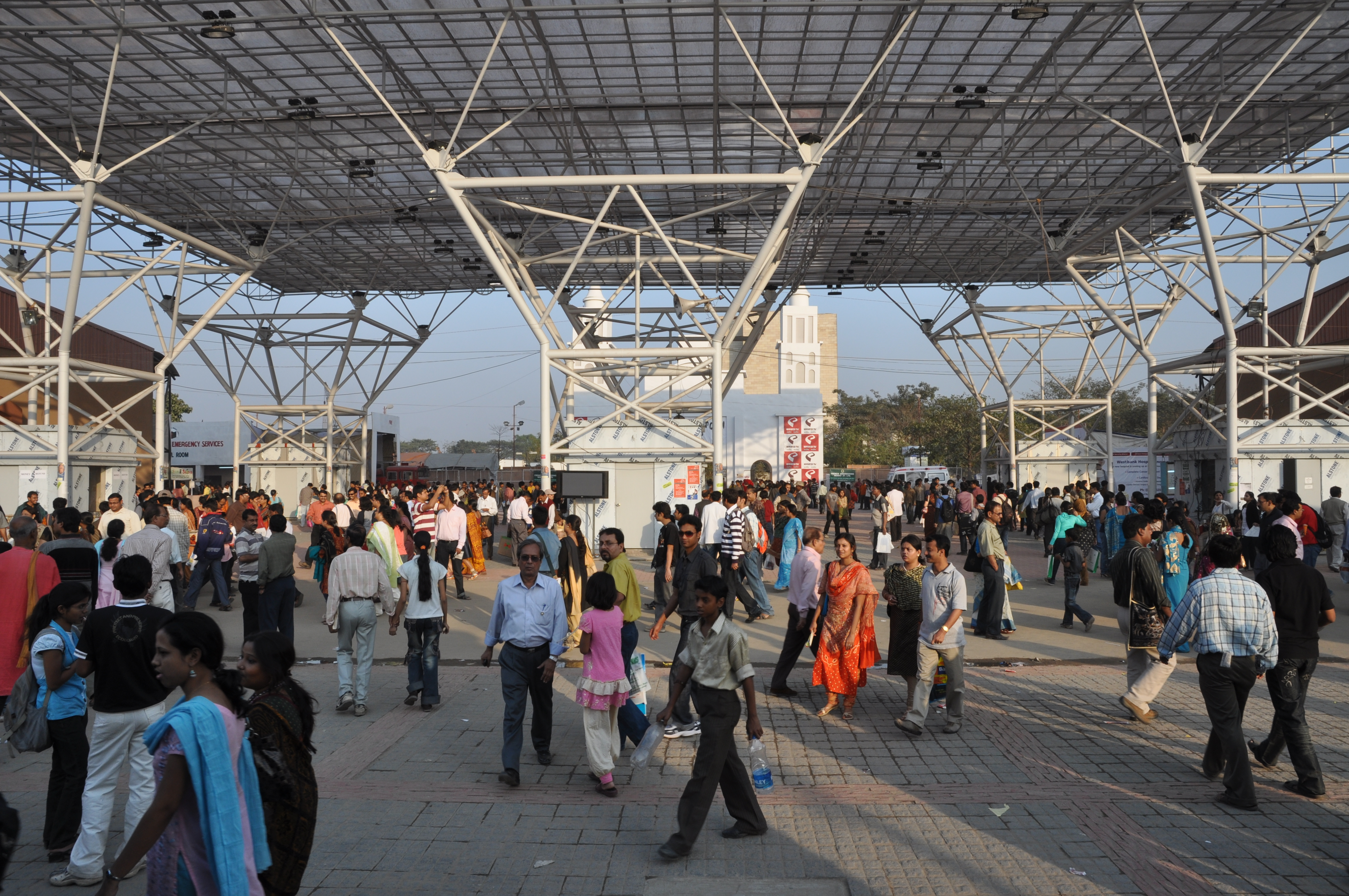
Kolkata Book Fair 2010

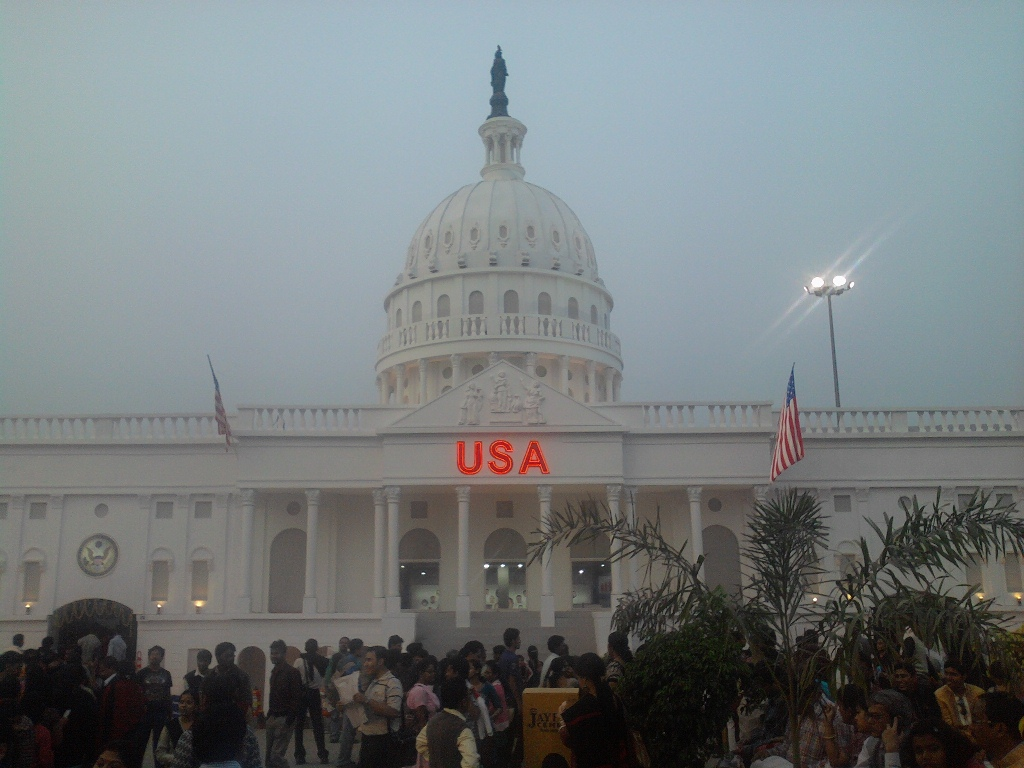
Photo of kolkata book fair

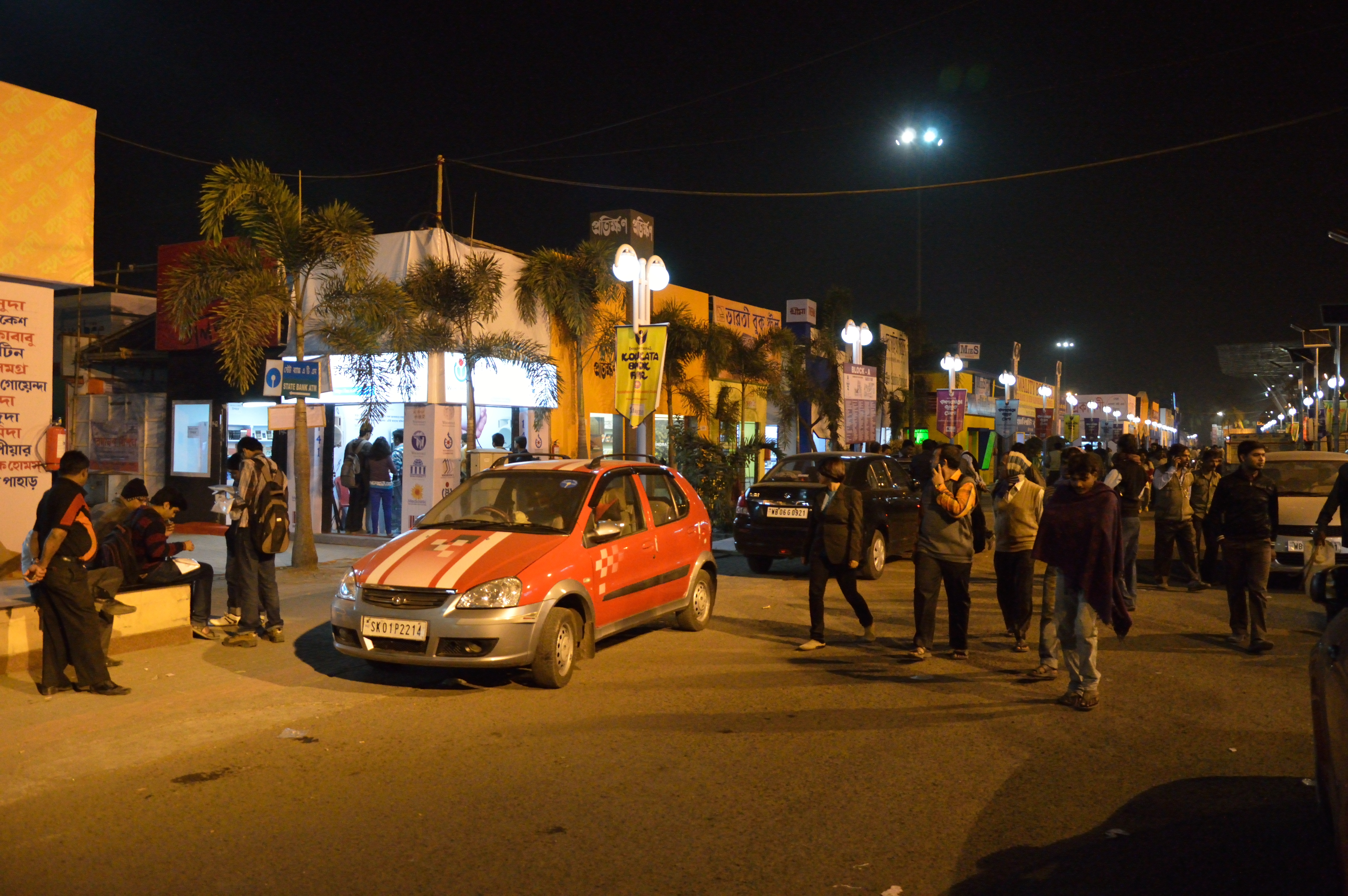
Milan mela

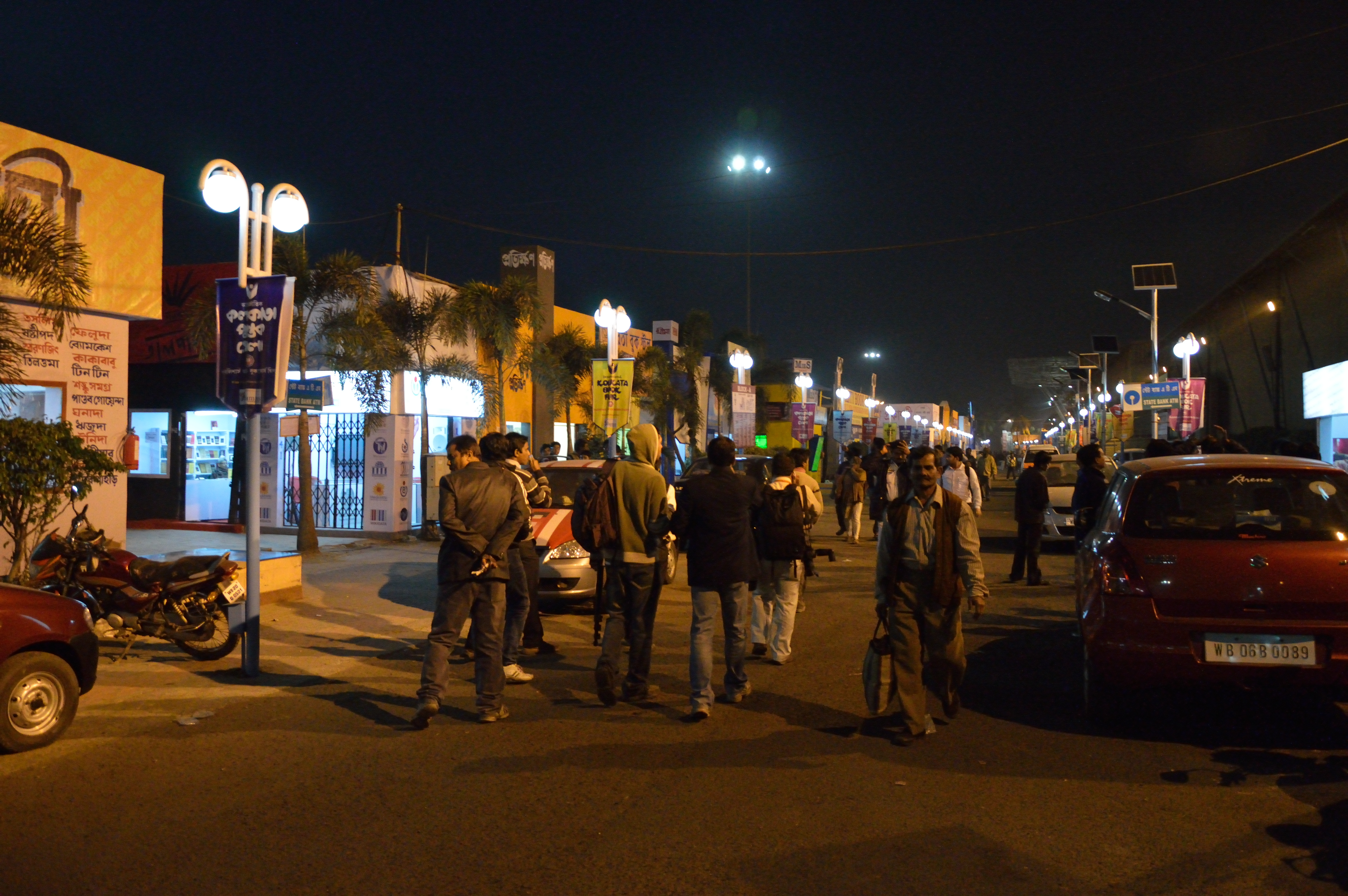
Milan mela

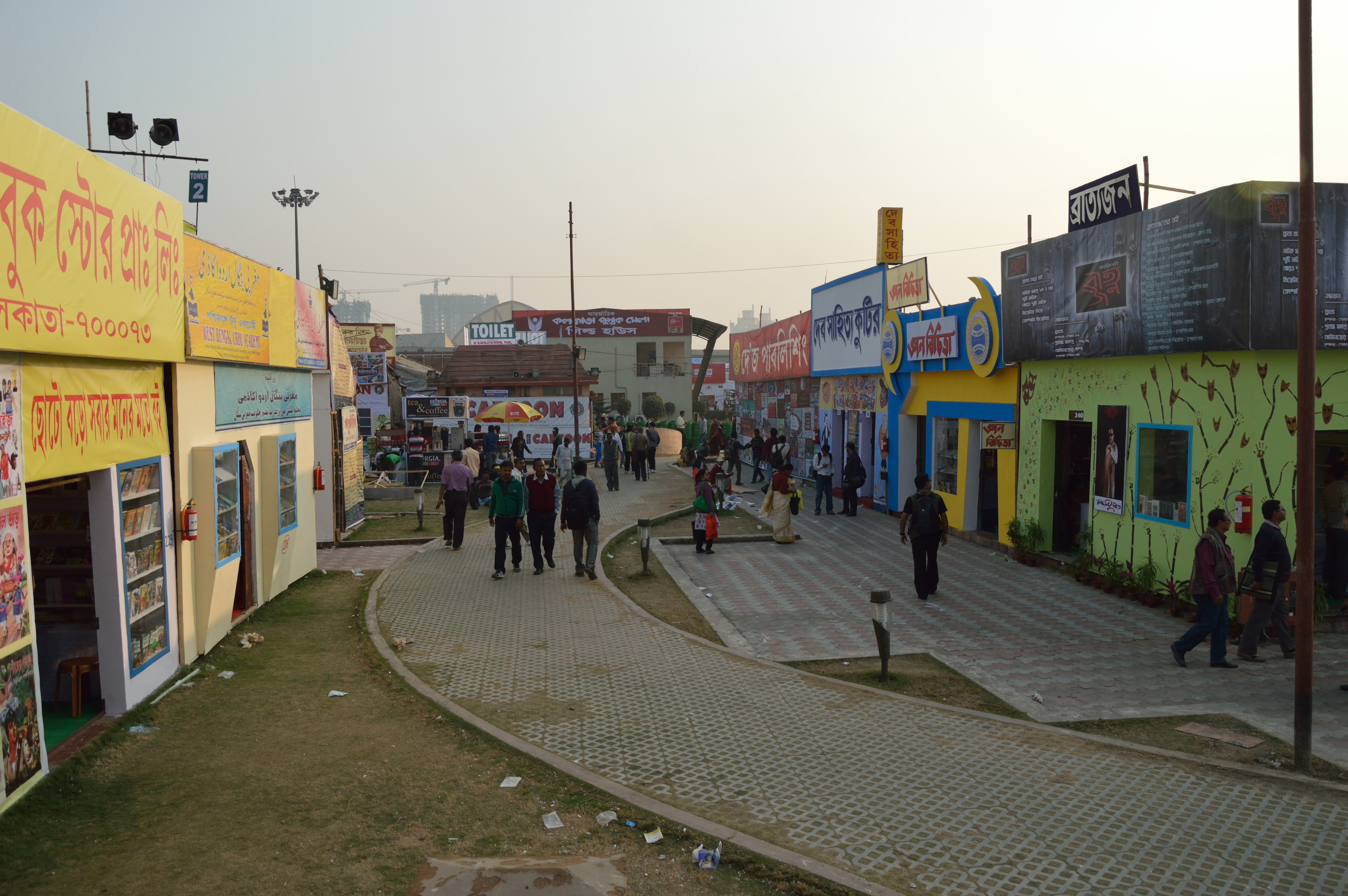
Milan mela

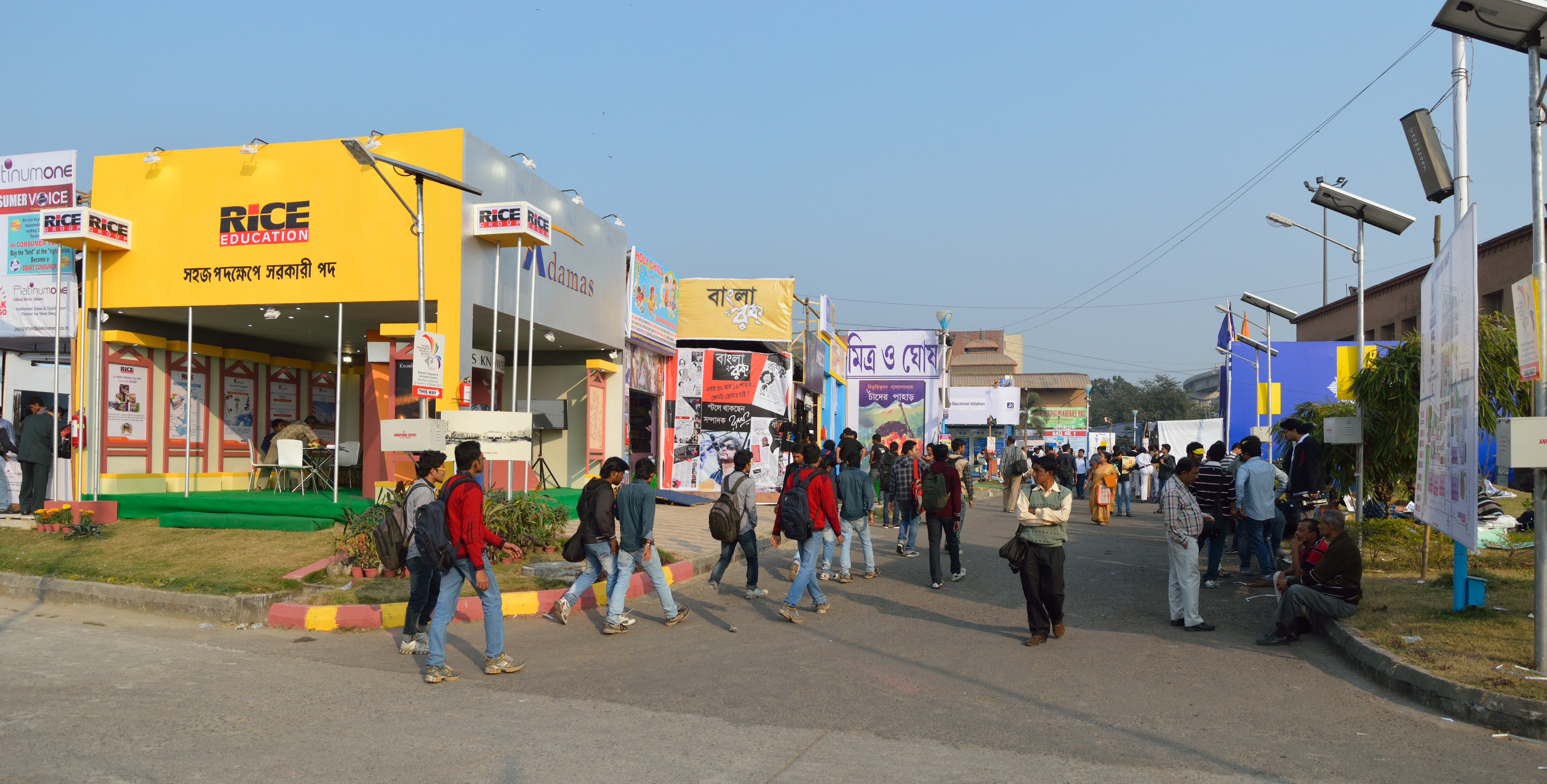
Milan mela

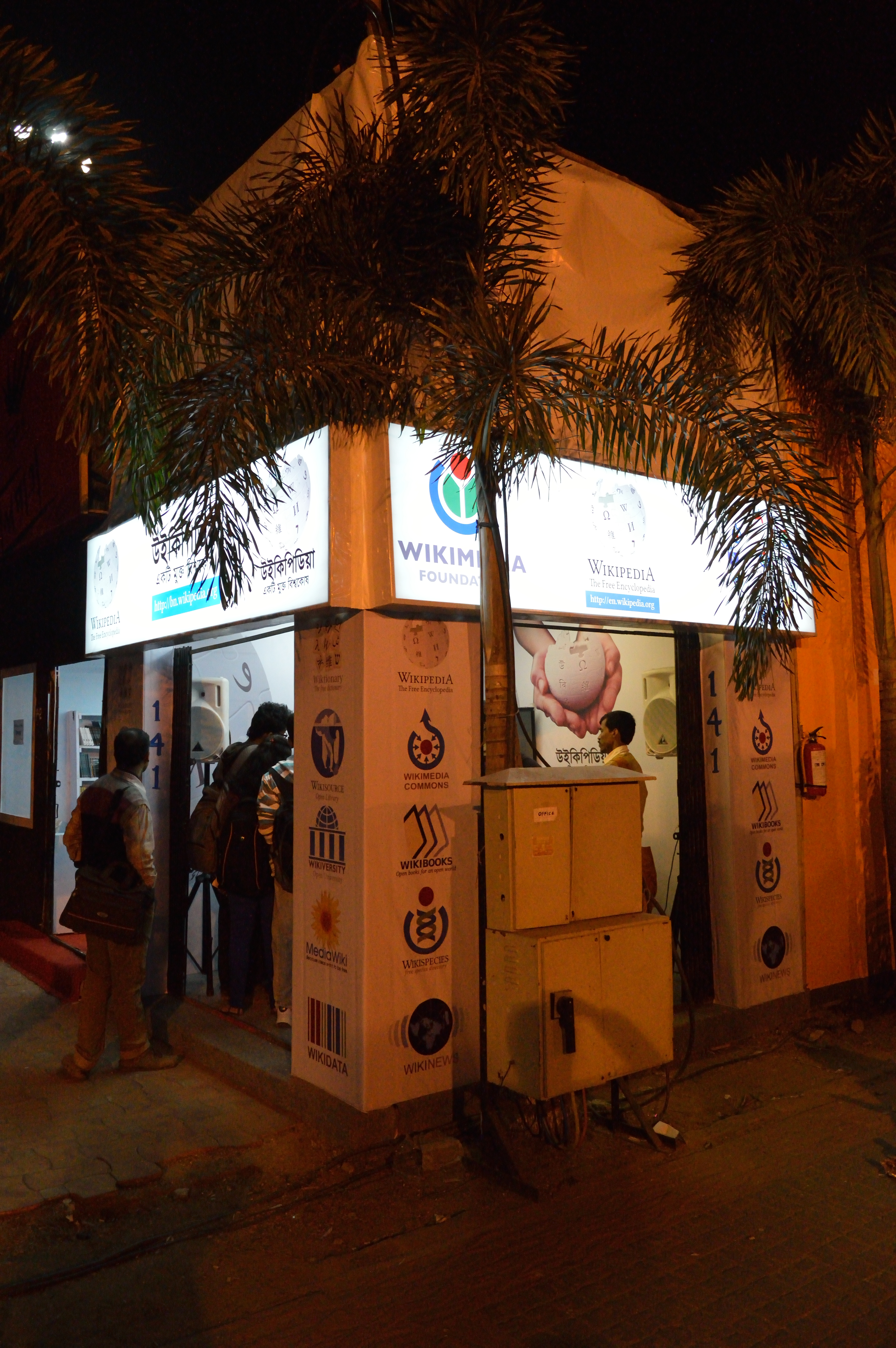
Wikipedia stall

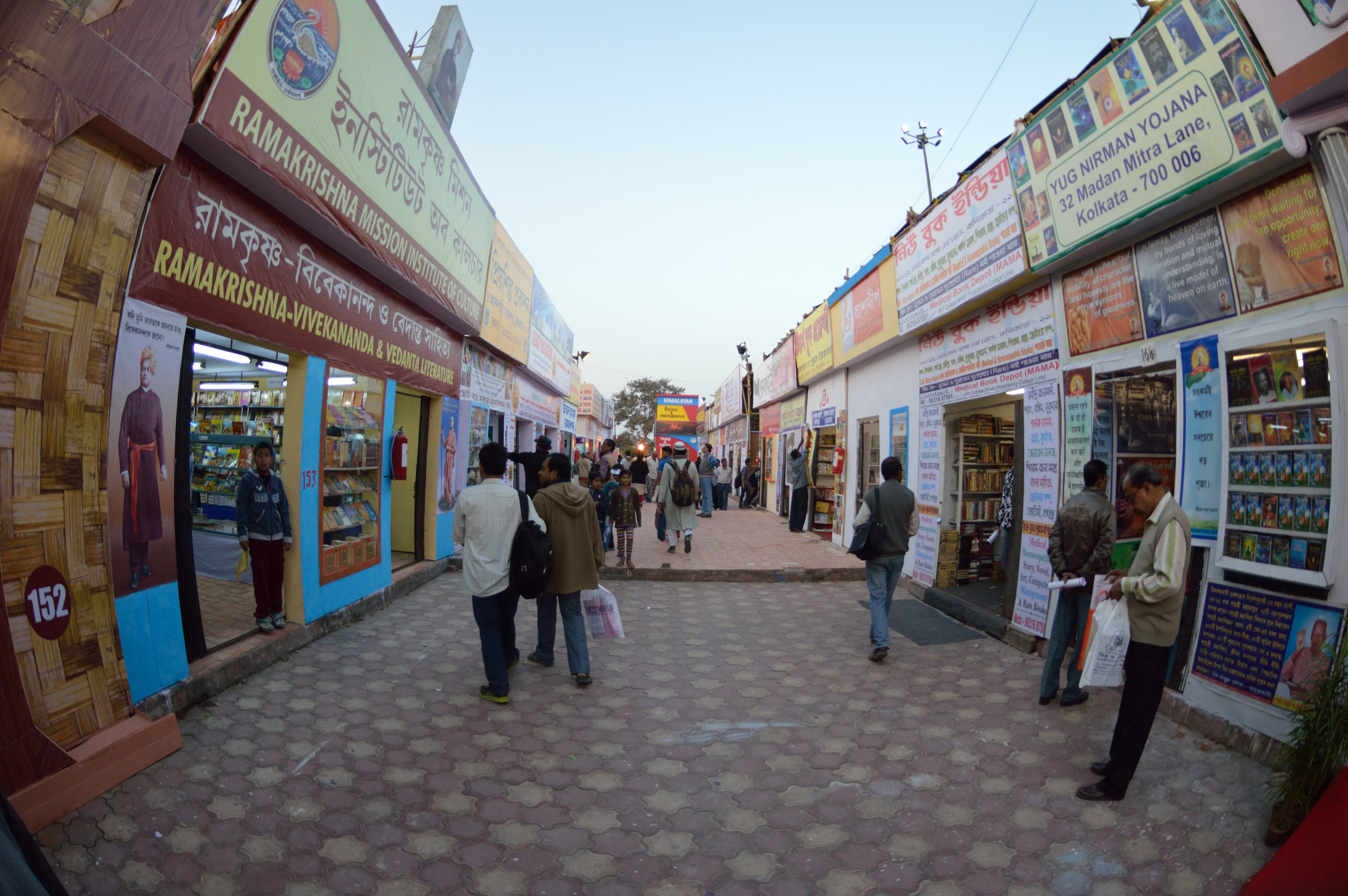
38th international book fair

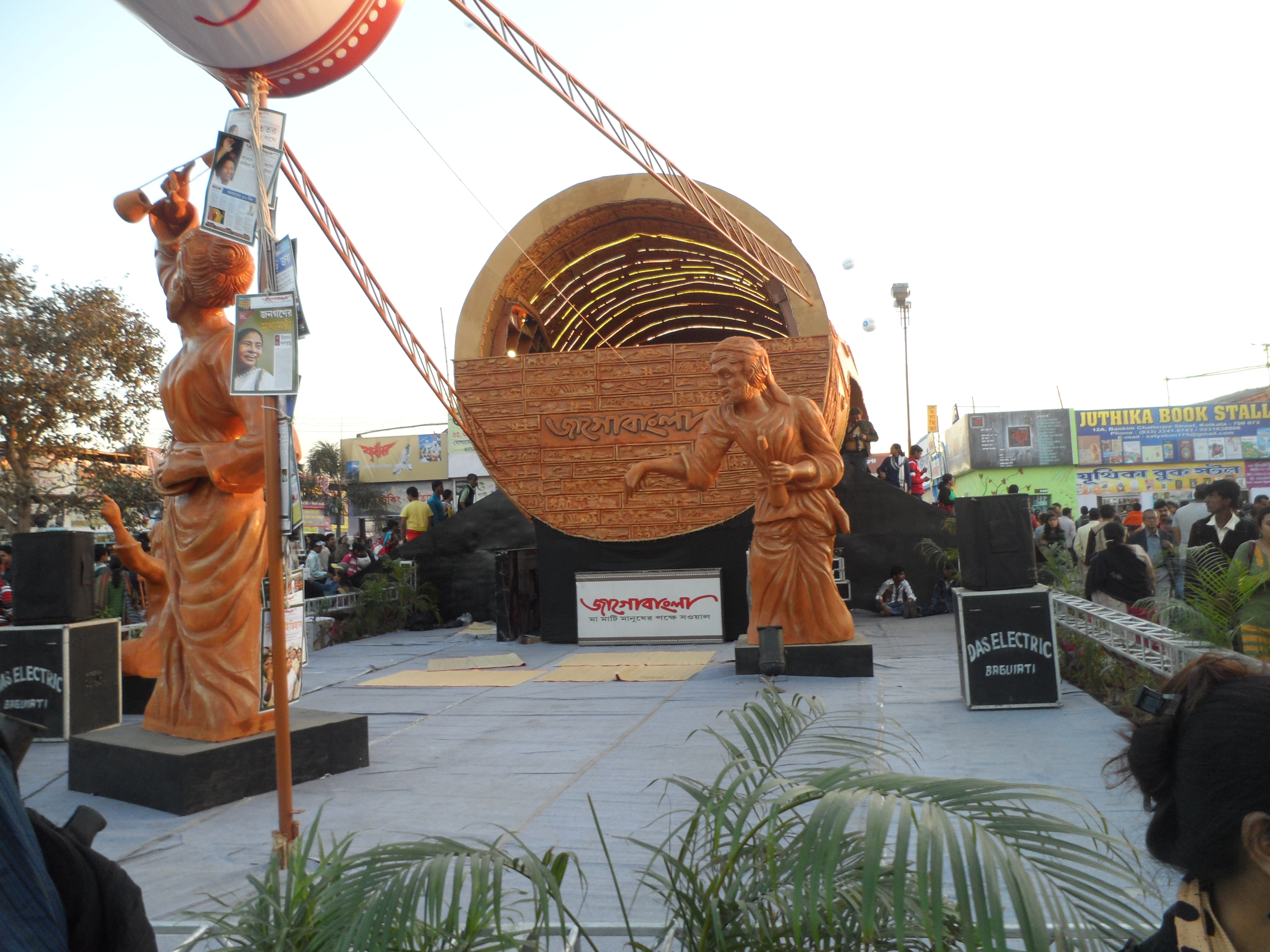
38th international book fair Jago Bangla

== See also ==
- Agartala Book Fair – Annual book fair usually held in February in Agartala, Tripura, India
- Chennai Book Fair – Annual book fair organized in Chennai, India
- Hyderabad Book Fair – Annual book fair in Hyderabad, India
- Kolkata Poetry Confluence – International multilingual literary festival
- Kolkata Suburban Railway – Regional rail system in Kolkata, India
