= Sathi Leelavathi (1936 film) =

1936 film by Ellis R. Dungan

- Theatrical poster
- Directed by: Ellis R. Dungan
- Screenplay by: Madras Kandaswamy Mudaliar
- Based on: Sathi Leelavathi by S. S. Vasan
- Produced by: A. N. Marudachalam Chettiar
- Starring: M. K. Radha; M. R. Gnanambal
- Cinematography: D. T. Telang; V. J. Shave
- Edited by: Sircar; Ellis R. Dungan
- Music by: Sharma brothers
- Production company: Manorama Films
- Release date: 1 February 1936
- Running time: 200 minutes
- Country: India
- Language: Tamil

Sathi Leelavathi (/səθi liːlɑːvəθi/ transl. Leelavathi, the Chaste Wife) is a 1936 Indian Tamil-language drama film directed by Ellis R. Dungan in his directorial debut. The screenplay by Madras Kandaswamy Mudaliar is based on S. S. Vasan's novel of the same name, which had been serialised in 1934. M. K. Radha stars as Krishnamurthy, a man from Madras, who is lured into drinking alcohol by an acquaintance. Believing he murdered his friend in a drunken stupor, Krishnamurthy flees to Ceylon while his wife and daughter, played by M. R. Gnanambal and M. K. Mani respectively, are reduced to poverty. T. S. Balaiah, M. G. Ramachandran, M. V. Mani and P. Nammalvar appear in supporting roles.

A. N. Marudachalam Chettiar initially wanted to produce a film version of the Madurai Original Boys Company (MOBC) play Pathi Bhakthi, but realised an adaptation was already being made. Chettiar then learnt about Vasan's novel, which had a similar plot and obtained the rights to make a film version. Sathi Leelavathi was the film-acting debuts of Radha, Balaiah, Ramachandran and K. A. Thangavelu. It was N. S. Krishnan's first film appearance, but his second release. The film was mostly shot at Vel Pictures Studio in Madras. D. T. Telang and V. J. Shave were the cinematographers, the Sharma brothers were the composers and the film was co-edited by Dungan and Sircar.

Sathi Leelavathi explores themes of temperance, social reform, the Gandhian concept of selfless service and the plight of labourers. It was one of the earliest Tamil films to be involved in a plagiarism controversy; the MOBC accused Chettiar and Mudaliar of plagiarising their play. The case was resolved after Vasan testified that both the play and the novel were based on Danesbury House, an 1860 novel written by Ellen Wood, so neither party could claim originality. The film was released in theatres on 1 February 1936 and became a commercial success, making Dungan a sought-after director. Several features of his direction, including shooting by schedule, camera mobility, cabaret dances and less-theatrical acting, became staples of Tamil cinema. No complete print of the film is known to survive, making it a partially lost film.

== Plot ==
Krishnamurthy is a wealthy man who lives in Madras with his wife Leelavathi and their daughter Lakshmi. Ramanathan, a friend of Krishnamurthy's, and Rangiah Naidu, a corrupt police inspector, plot together to ruin Krishnamurthy. Persuaded by Ramanathan, Krishnamurthy begins to drink alcohol, and becomes infatuated with Mohanangi, a promiscuous woman, promising to pay her ₹50,000 (about US$18,700 in 1936). (Note: The exchange rate in 1936 was 2.67 Indian rupees (₹) per 1 US dollar (US$).)

Parasuraman, Krishnamurthy's friend, tries but fails to reform him. A Marvadi man who lent money to Krishnamurthy obtains a repayment warrant, sinking Krishnamurthy deep in debt. Krishnamurthy drunkenly accuses Leelavathi of having an affair with Parasuraman. When Parasuraman arrives at Krishnamurthy's house while he is absent, Leelavathi warns him to leave. Parasuram leaves but forgets his umbrella. Krishnamurthy comes home drunk, sees the umbrella, assaults Leelavathi and goes out to shoot Parasuraman. Meanwhile, Ramanathan sends his servant disguised as Parasuraman to steal the treasuries of the Ekambareswarar Temple.

Krishnamurthy chases Ramanathan's servant, whom he thinks is Parasuraman; a shot is heard, and the servant is killed. After coming to his senses, Krishnamurthy thinks he has murdered Parasuraman and decides to escape, leaving Leelavathi and Lakshmi in the custody of his servant Govindan. Krishnamurthy flees to Ceylon, where he leads a wretched life as a labourer on a tea estate. Ramanathan makes advances on Leelavathi, who spurns him. Penniless, she goes with Govindan and Lakshmi, and works as a charkha spinner. Krishnamurthy finds treasure and gives it to his master, who is pleased and adopts him as his son.

Krishnamurthy returns to his family in Madras but is arrested for Parasuraman's murder. Detective Sreenivasan's investigation reveals the malicious intent of Ramanathan and Rangiah, and he produces the real Parasuraman in court. Parasuraman reveals himself, proving Krishnamurthy's innocence. Ramanathan had been secretly following the drunken Krishnamurthy, who passed out and dropped his gun. When the servant came out, Ramanathan picked up the gun, shot the servant and placed it in Krishnamurthy's hand. Krishnamurthy is acquitted, Ramanathan is sentenced to death and Rangiah receives seven years' imprisonment. Lakshmi and Parasuraman's son Chandrakanthan marry.

== Cast ==
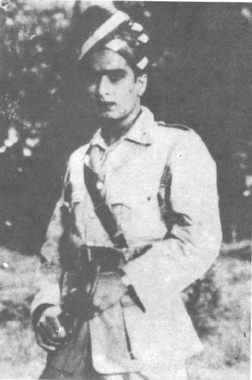
M. G. Ramachandran

Male cast

- M. K. Radha as Krishnamurthy
- T. S. Balaiah (Note: Credited as Baliah in the pressbook.) as Ramanathan
- M. G. Ramachandran as Inspector Rangiah
- M. V. Mani as Sreenivasan
- M. K. Mani as Lakshmi
- P. Nammalvar as Parasuraman
- T. N. Lakshmana Rao as Govindan
- P. N. Ramakrishnan as the devotee

Female cast

- M. R. Gnanambal as Leelavathi
- Dhanalakshmi as Bama
- Santhakumari as Mohanangi
- M. Chanthraboi as Shanbagavalli

Comedians

- M. S. Murugesan as the Marvadi
- N. S. Krishnan as Balu
- S. Sundaram as Sesha Iyengar

J. Susheela Devi appears uncredited as a cabaret dancer, and K. A. Thangavelu plays a minor role, also uncredited. Parasuraman's son Chandrakanthan, Ramanathan's servant and Krishnamurthy's master in Ceylon are played by uncredited actors.

== Production ==
=== Development ===
Pathi Bhakthi, a Tamil play dealing with alcohol abuse and its effects on family life, was written by Te. Po. Krishnaswamy Pavalar during the early 1930s and was successful throughout the Madras Presidency. Pavalar's play was rewritten for the Madurai Original Boy's Company (MOBC) theatre troupe by playwright Madras Kandaswamy Mudaliar, and this production was also successful. A. N. Marudachalam Chettiar of Manorama Films wanted to produce Pathi Bhakthi as a film, but a film version was already being made. (Note: While historian Randor Guy's 1997 book Starlight, Starbright says MOBC themselves decided to produce a film version of their play, his 2016 book Memories of Madras and historian Vamanan say that Chidambaram Chettiar of National Movietone had acquired the film rights for the play.)

Chettiar, still determined, approached Mudaliar who told him about S. S. Vasan's 1934 novel Sathi Leelavathi. First serialised in the weekly magazine Ananda Vikatan, the novel had the same storyline as Pathi Bhakthi. Chettiar and Mudaliar approached Vasan, who sold the film rights for ₹200 (about $75 in 1936). Mudaliar was then signed on as the screenwriter and soon began developing the screenplay. Vasan, who had never previously been involved with a film project, was credited in Sathi Leelavathi's opening titles for the original story.

Chettiar wanted Manik Lal Tandon to direct the film but he declined; (Note: Although Randor Guy has said that Tandon was reluctant to accept Sathi Leelavathi because he was directing Bhakta Nandanar (1935), Ellis R. Dungan said after Bhakta Nandanar's release, Tandon asked him if he would direct Sathi Leelavathi since he (Tandon) had an offer to direct the Hindi film Shame of the Nation.) Tandon instead suggested his American friend Ellis R. Dungan. Chettiar was hesitant because Dungan was new to India and did not know Tamil or much about Indian culture, but was persuaded to hire him because he had worked as a technician in Hollywood. The film was Dungan's directorial debut, (Note: Dungan previously filmed scenes in Bhakta Nandanar in Tandon's absence.) and was the first Indian film to be directed by a foreigner. Because Dungan did not know Tamil, Chettiar hired C. K. Sathasivan as associate director. S. Panju, who would later go on to become a part of the Krishnan–Panju directorial duo, was an assistant director.

Sathi Leelavathi was one of the earliest Tamil films to be involved in a plagiarism controversy; when it was still in the pre-production stage, MOBC sued Chettiar and Mudaliar for plagiarising Pathi Bhakthi. There were many similarities noted between the two stories; for example, "Leelavathi" was the name of the female lead in both. The case was resolved when Vasan testified that both Pathi Bhakthi and the novel Sathi Leelavathi were based on Ellen Wood's 1860 novel Danesbury House, therefore neither party could claim originality. The film explores themes of temperance, social reform, the Gandhian concept of selfless service, and labour—in particular the plight of Tamil Nadu labourers in Ceylon's tea estates.

=== Casting ===
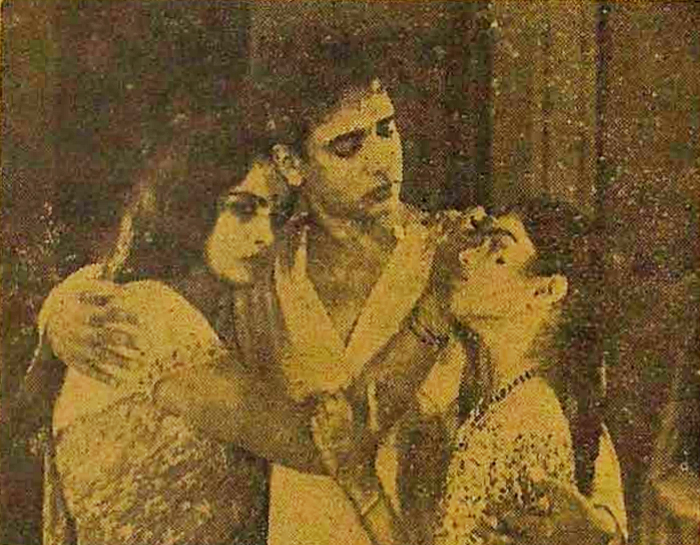
(L to R): M. R. Gnanambal, M. K. Radha and M. K. Mani

Mudaliar had initially intended to launch a career in film for his son M. K. Radha, an MOBC actor, with Pathi Bhakthi, but another MOBC actor K. P. Kesavan was selected for the lead role instead. Radha was eventually cast as the protagonist Krishnamurthy of Sathi Leelavathi. Other MOBC actors who made their screen debuts with the film were N. S. Krishnan, (Note: Although Sathi Leelavathi was Krishnan's first film project, because of production delays caused by the lawsuit, it became his second release.) T. S. Balaiah, and M. G. Ramachandran, appearing as comedic character Balu, antagonist Ramanathan, and a police officer respectively. Krishnan wrote the screenplay for his scenes and put on weight for the role.

Ramachandran appeared in Pathi Bhakthi as the antagonist's henchman Veeramuthu, but MOBC owner Sachidanandam Pillai did not offer him a role in the film adaptation. He later approached Mudaliar for a role in Sathi Leelavathi because he felt his role in Pathi Bhakthi offered him "no room to shine". According to Ramachandran, he was told he would play Detective Sreenivasan and later Krishnamurthy's friend Parasuraman, but he was cast as Inspector Rangiah Naidu—a role he disliked. Despite Ramachandran's reluctance, his mother was happy he got a "respectable" role and advised him to perform it responsibly. Chettiar gave the role of Sreenivasan to M. V. Mani, and P. Nammalvar was cast as Parasuraman.

The casting of Krishnamurthy's wife Leelavathi was difficult; no actress was willing to play the character because the script required her to be physically abused and mistreated by her inebriated husband. In despair, the producer asked Mudaliar and Radha to cast M. R. Gnanambal, Radha's wife, in the role. Gnanambal, who had retired from acting after her marriage, was initially reluctant to accept the role, but did so because no other actress would. Leelavathi's daughter Lakshmi was played by M. K. Mani, a boy. The film was also the feature debut of K. A. Thangavelu.

=== Filming ===
Principal photography for Sathi Leelavathi began in 1935. Although Manorama Films was based in Coimbatore, the film was shot primarily at Vel Pictures Studio, Madras. Most of the cast were theatre actors and Dungan later recalled that he had to tell them to soften their voices and tone down their facial expressions. This included Ramachandran, who according to Dungan did not initially understand the nuances of film acting and performed aggressively as though he was on stage until Dungan convinced him to deliver his lines naturally. Some of the actors were scared of the camera, and Dungan recalled them freezing in front of it, unable to speak.

Ramachandran did not know how to ride a bicycle, so a sequence that required him to ride one was filmed with him sitting on the bicycle with two people balancing it. They gave the bicycle a push as the camera rolled. According to film historian Film News Anandan, filming was also done in Ceylon but Randor Guy wrote in the fortnightly Madras Musings that a large plot of land behind Vel Pictures Studio was used for the Ceylon tea plantation. With this film, Dungan introduced many features to Tamil cinema such as a lack of on-screen stage influences, the "cabaret dance" or the "club dance", strict discipline, filming by schedule and camera mobility.

There was no facility to pre-record songs in Madras at the time so performers had to sing on set. The accompanying musicians sat on a trolley and played the background musical score; this often restricted camera movement. In one scene, the orchestra sat under a nearby tree playing the harmonium, tabla and other instruments while Radha's character sang at a tea plantation The film's cinematographers were D. T. Telang and V. J. Shave, and Sircar and Dungan were the editors. Ramamurthi, the manager of Vel Pictures Studio, cleaned the exposed negatives by hand. The completed film was 18,000 ft (5,500 m) in length and ran for 200 minutes.

== Music ==
The Sharma brothers, a trio, composed the music of Sathi Leelavathi, but are not credited in the film's song book. G. Sundhara Bhagavathar (also known as Sundhara Vadhiyar) was the lyricist in his cinematic debut.

The melody of "Theyila Thottathle" (also spelt "Theyilai Thottatile") is based on Subramania Bharati's song "Karumbu Thottathile". While "Karumbu Thottathile" is about the plight of bonded Indian labourers in Fiji, "Theyila Thottathle" follows the problems of tea-plantation workers in Ceylon. The song, which is set to the Carnatic raga Chenchurutti, became popular and was frequently performed in concerts by Carnatic musicians. It was re-used in the Malayalam film Balan (1938), as "Jaathaka Doshathale".

The other songs featured in the film were "Thaayadhu Vayatrile Maayamai", "Thodudaiya Seviyan Vidai", "Hello Yennudaiya Dear", "Adhigha Sinamaen", "Paadhai Theriyamale", "Ini Yenna Seighuvaen Dhaeviyae", "Sadhikaaramaaranovubaanam", "Kaami Satthiyamaa Kannatthaik", "Pudhu Nilaa Mughap Poomaan Punniya", "Kallae Kadavuladaa Thambi", "Vaazhvinilae Maghaa Thaazvadaindhaenaiyo", "Undheepara Adhi Unnadha Thakkaliyae" and "Raattinamae Kadhar Poottinamae Kai".

== Release ==
Sathi Leelavathi was released in theatres on 1 February 1936, and became a major commercial success; according to film historian Aranthai Narayanan, this was due to Radha, Balaiah's and Krishnan's performances, Vasan's publicity, and support by independence-era politicians of the anti-alcohol movement. The film ran for over 100 days in theatres. No complete print of Sathi Leelavathi is known to survive, making it a partially lost film. Only some footage covering the film's shooting remains.

== Reception ==
On 1 February 1936, The Indian Express appreciated the film's photography and recording, and said the acting was "generally satisfactory". The art magazine Aadal Paadal praised the film's social setting and cast performances in its January 1937 issue. Politician C. Rajagopalachari, a frequent critic of cinema, also appreciated the film's Gandhian ideals and pro-prohibition stance but said "the main artiste in a [charkha]-spinning sequence did not know how to handle it". A day's box-office revenue was donated to Rajagopalachari for public causes. Playwright and retired sub-judge Pammal Sambandha Mudaliar praised Radha for performing a "difficult part very creditably" and said the music was appropriate.

In a 14 February 1936 review, The Hindu praised Radha's performance for its "naturalness and ease", Balaiah's villainy and Gnanambal's performance in the "difficult role" of Leelavathi. The reviewer also praised Sathi Leelavathi's sound quality, photography and direction. The Illustrated Weekly of India called the film more "interesting, natural and convincing" than the source novel, and praised the plot's continuity and climax. A Cine Art Review writer appreciated the film's settings and sound, the cross-gender acting of M. K. Mani as Lakshmi, and the opening scene in which Lakshmi hums a tune while going downstairs. A writer for The Indian Review wrote that the film "appeals to all classes and masses of the Tamil province".

Several new filmmaking techniques introduced by Dungan were unappreciated at the time. In Silver Screen magazine on 1 August 1936, Pe. Ko. Sundararajan (journalist and writer for Manikodi) said the new methods of depicting emotions were not understood by the audience; in one scene, Dungan showed the dancing girl as seen by the inebriated protagonist, and in another he indicated his fear by depicting his twitching fingers and feet. According to Sundararajan, the techniques helped the actors to emote and showcased Dungan's talent; however, the audience thought the lighting in the first scene was poor and that the film was stuck in the second. He opined that this reflected their ignorance.

== Legacy ==
Sathi Leelavathi attained cult status in Tamil cinema and made Dungan an in-demand director. Techniques introduced by Dungan in the film have become staples of Tamil cinema. Footage of the film's production and filming was included in the 2013 documentary An American in Madras, which is about Dungan's career in India. Sathi Leelavathi was the first Tamil film to be successful in overseas markets. According to film historian Swarnavel Eswaran Pillai, despite Vasan's initial aversion to films, its success encouraged him to enter the industry as a distributor.

Sathi Leelavathi marked the film debut of Ramachandran, who would later go on achieve stardom for his work in the Tamil film industry. He was paid an advance of ₹100 (about $37.50 in 1936); it was the first time he had seen a 100-rupee note. Ramachandran avoided playing roles similar to Rangiah Naidu in his later films, preferring to play a "good Samaritan" in films like Marmayogi (1951), Malaikkallan (1954), Nadodi Mannan (1958) and Enga Veettu Pillai (1965).

== Bibliography ==
- Baskaran, S. Theodore (1981). The Message Bearers: The Nationalist Politics and the Entertainment Media in South India, 1880–1945. Chennai: Cre-A. OCLC 9441794.
- Baskaran, S. Theodore (1996). The Eye of the Serpent: An introduction to Tamil cinema. East West Books. OCLC 243920437.
- Baskaran, S. Theodore (2004). Chithiram Pesuthadi [The Picture Speaks, Dear] (in Tamil). Chennai: Kalachuvadu. ISBN 81-87477-75-X.
- Dungan, Ellis R.; Smik, Barbara (2001). A Guide to Adventure: An Autobiography. Pittsburgh: Dorrance Publishing Company. OCLC 50318101.
- George, T. J. S. (2016). M.S. Subbulakshmi: The Definitive Biography. Aleph Book Company. ISBN 9789384067601.
- Guy, Randor (1997). Starlight, Starbright: The Early Tamil Cinema. Chennai: Amra Publishers. OCLC 52794531.
- Guy, Randor (2016). Gopal, T. S. (ed.). Memories of Madras: Its Movies, Musicians & Men of Letters. Chennai: Creative Workshop. ISBN 978-81-928961-7-5.
- Jayababu, S. V. (2000). புன்னகை வள்ளல் எம்.ஜி.ஆர். நினைவுகள் 2000 [Memories of the philanthropist of smiles MGR 2000] (PDF) (in Tamil). Chennai: Jayababu.
- Kannan, R. (2010). Anna: The Life and Times of C. N. Annadurai. New Delhi: Penguin Books. ISBN 978-0-670-08328-2.
- Kannan, R. (28 June 2017). MGR: A Life. India: Penguin Random House. ISBN 978-93-86495-88-4.
- Muthiah, S. (2004) [1981]. Madras Rediscovered: A Historical Guide to Looking Around (5th ed.). Chennai: East West Books. ISBN 81-88661-24-4.
- Pillai, Swarnavel Eswaran (2015). Madras Studios: Narrative, Genre, and Ideology in Tamil Cinema. New Delhi: SAGE Publications. ISBN 978-93-5150-212-8.
- Raghavendra, M. K., ed. (2017). Beyond Bollywood: The Cinemas of South India. HarperCollins. ISBN 9789352645701.
- Rajadhyaksha, Ashish; Willemen, Paul (1998) [1994]. Encyclopaedia of Indian Cinema. British Film Institute and Oxford University Press. ISBN 0-19-563579-5.
