= Hyderabad Book Fair =

Annual book fair in Hyderabad, India

Hyderabad National Book Fair
- Status: Active
- Genre: Multi-genre
- Frequency: Annually
- Venue: Telangana Kala Bharati (NTR Grounds), Domalguda
- Location: Hyderabad
- Country: India
- Inaugurated: 1985
- Organizer: Hyderabad Book Fair Society
- Website: www.hyderabadbookfair.com

The Hyderabad Book Fair is a winter fair in Hyderabad.

Hyderabad's 36th National Book Fair was held from 9 February 2024 to 19 February 2024 and inaugurated by cultural minister Jupally Krishna Rao. The book fair is usually held every December. However, due to 2023 Telangana Legislative Assembly elections the fair has been scheduled to February.

== See also ==
- Agartala Book Fair
- Chennai Book Fair
- Kolkata Book Fair
- Yakoob, president of the Book Fair since of May 21, 2024
