= Agartala Book Fair =

Annual book fair usually held in February in Agartala, Tripura, India

Agartala Book Fair (Bengali language: আগরতলা বইমেলা) is an annual book fair usually held in January, February or March in Agartala, Tripura, India.

== History ==
It was started on 30 March 1981 and lasted for 10 days.

In 2017, Tripura Publishers' Guild Secretary Raghunath Sarkar said, "After New Delhi and Kolkata book fairs, Agartala book fair is the most popular book fair in India."

The fair's Silver jubilee (25th year) was celebrated in 2007, as it was not held in 1990 and 1993.

Until 2020, it was usually held at Umakanta Academy or Agartala Children's Park, after which the fair was moved to the Hapania International Fair Ground.

From the year 2022, this book fair is started in the month of March instead of February. The 43rd edition was held from 2 January to 14 January 2025. The 44th Agartala Book Fair ran from January 2 to January 14, 2026.

== Events and participants ==
The fair lasts for ten days or more. Publishers and book sellers from Mumbai, Kolkata, Bangladesh, Guwahati, Delhi etc. participate in the fair by setting up stalls. The fair showcases a variety of books, cultural programs, exhibitions and gatherings of writers. Various discussions on different topics related to literature are also held during the fair.

== See also ==
- Kolkata Book Fair
- Chennai Book Fair
- Hyderabad Book Fair
