= V. Sriram =

Indian entrepreneur, columnist and music historian

Venkatakrishnan Sriram
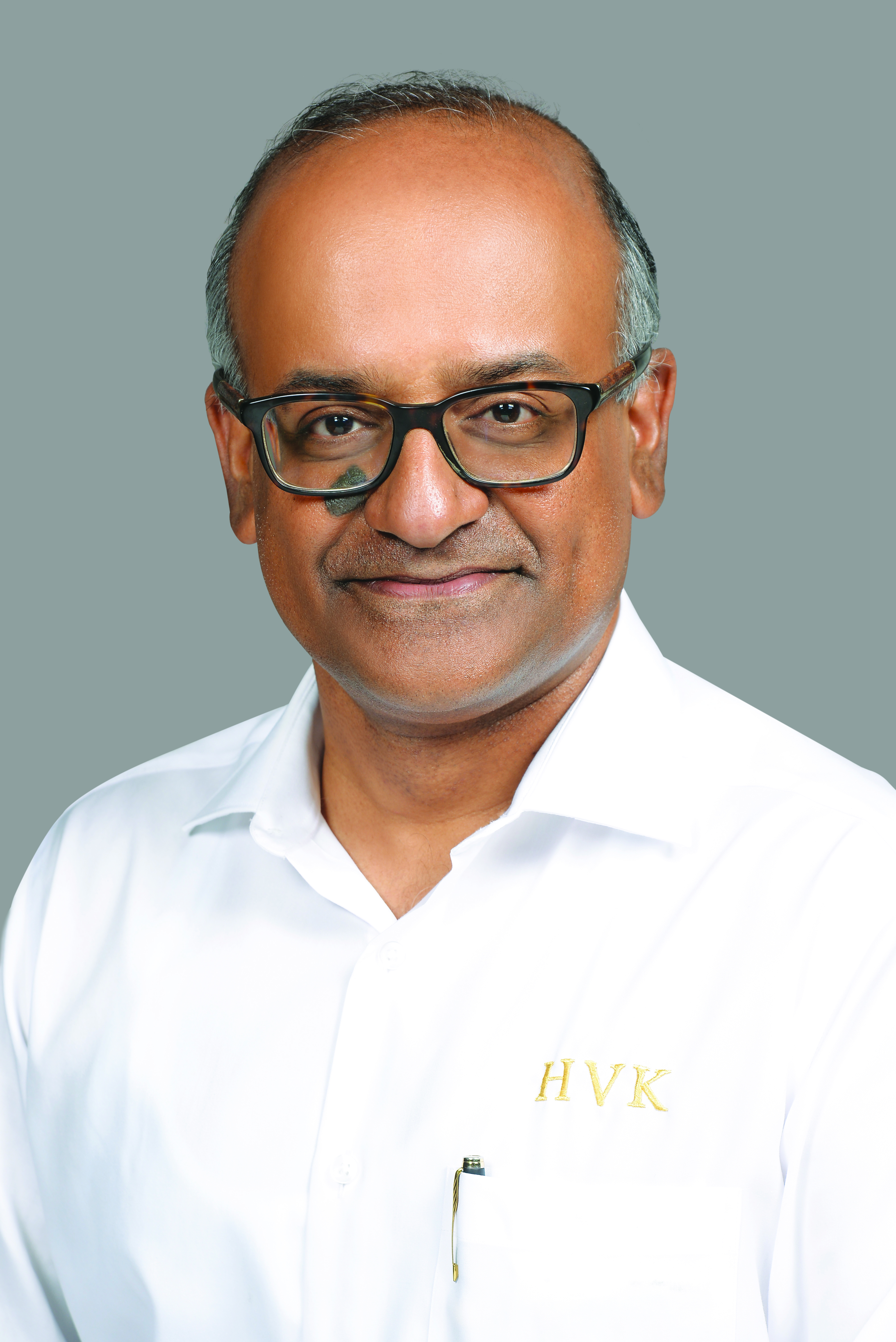
- Born: 22 June 1966 (age 60); United Kingdom
- Education: Delhi University

Sriram Venkatakrishnan (born 22 June 1966) is an Indian entrepreneur, columnist, music historian and heritage activist. He was schooled in Madras and Calcutta. His bachelor's in engineering from the Delhi College of Engineering in 1987 was followed by a master's in business administration specializing in marketing and advertising from Delhi University. Sriram then moved on to a varied career in marketing and advertising before joining his family businesses in Industrial Hydraulics and Software.

== Works ==
- Sriram, V. (2004). Carnatic summer: Life of twenty great exponents. East West Books. ISBN 8188661260.
- Sriram, V. (2007). The Devadasi and the Saint – the Life and Times of Bangalore Nagarathnamma. Westland Books. ISBN 9788188661701.
- Sriram, V. (2008). Semmangudi Srinivasa Iyer, Life & Music. Westland. ISBN 9788188661787.
- Sriram, V. (2008). Historic Residences of Chennai. Chandra Sankar.
- Sriram, V.; Rangaswami, Malathi (2009). Four Score and more - The History of the Music Academy Madras. Westland Books. ISBN 978-9384030476.
- Sriram, V. (2012). Championing Enterprise: 175 years of the Madras Chamber of Commerce and Industry. The Madras Chamber of Commerce and Industry.
- Sriram, V. Friends of the Earth, the T Stanes Story.
- Sriram, V (2013). Goodness and Mercy, the life and times of Dr Mathuram Santosham.
- Sriram, V.; Bhatt, Karthik (2016). Brick by brick - The Vidya Mandir Story.
- Sriram, V (2016). An Unbeaten Century, Hundred Years of Karur Vysya Bank.
- Sriram, V (2016). An Eye For Detail – the Chronicle of CAMS.
- Sriram, V (2017). Brotherhood and Benevolence, the 300 year history of English Freemasonry in South India.
- Sriram, V (2017). A guide to Fort St George, Palaniappa Brothers. ISBN 9788183797566.
- Sriram, V (2018). The Rane Story, a Journey in Excellence.
- Sriram, V (2018). Integrity and Excellence, The Sanmar Story.
- Sriram, V. (2018). When Mercy Seasons Justice: the Life and Times of Habibullah Badsha.

== Heritage walks ==
Sriram pioneered the concept of heritage walks in Chennai. This was in 1999, when he led a heritage walk in Mylapore . Since then his monthly heritage tours in different areas of the city and his quarterly heritage tours in other parts of India have attracted a wide audience. As of 2018, Sriram has completed 75 different historic tours in Chennai and elsewhere.

== Other details ==
Sriram is a regular columnist with The Hindu and is Associate Editor of Madras Musings, the fortnightly brought out by S Muthiah, the city's best-known chronicler. He is currently one of the four Secretaries of the Music Academy, Madras, in which capacity he is the Convenor of its Annual Conference. Sriram's blog Madras Heritage and Carnatic Music is a popular site for trivia on the two subjects that he writes on. He was also Convenor of the Chennai Chapter of the Indian National Trust for Arts and Cultural Heritage during 2012/13.
