= Yakoob (Kavi) =

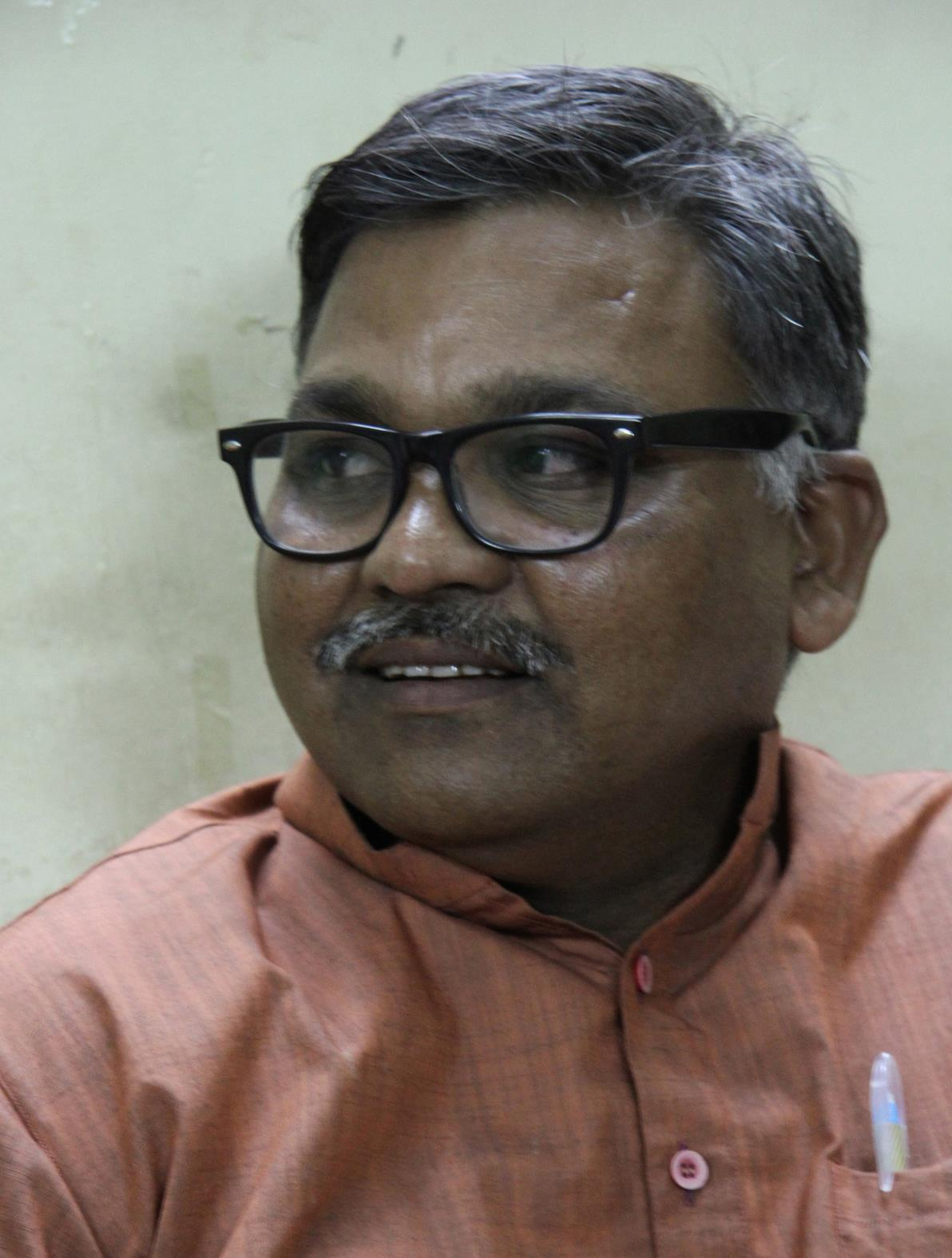
- Poet Yakoob
- Born: Yakoob; March 2, 1962 (age 64) (India) Rottamaku Revu , Khammam district , Telangana
- Other name: కవి యాకూబ్
- Occupations: Teacher; Writer
- Employer: Retired as Associate Professor of Telugu
- Spouse: Dr. P. Lakshmi (Shilalolita)
- Children: Sandeep, Sahir Bharati
- Parents: Shaik Mohammad Miya (father); Shaik Hoorambi (mother)

Yakoob is a Telugu poet, a teacher, and the founder of 'Kavisangamam'. Chekuri Ramarao ('Chera') praised him in the 'Cheratalu' column of the *Andhra Jyothi* newspaper, describing him with the phrase "Bahut Khoob Yakoob" (Excellent Yakoob) in the context of Telugu poetry. He was appointed as a Telugu advisor to the Sahitya Akademi

He has instituted the 'Rottamakurevu Poetry Award'—in memory of his father (the late) Shaik Mohammad Miya, his mentor (the late) K.L. Narasimha Rao, and his uncle (the late) Puritipati Rami Reddy—and presents it to young poets. Poet Yaqoob was elected as the President of the Hyderabad Book Fair on May 21, 2024.

The state government issued orders appointing him as a member of the Advisory Committee of the Telangana Department of Language and Culture on June 30, 2025.

== Birth ==
Yakoob was born on March 2, 1962, to the couple Shaik Mohammad Miya and Shaik Hoorambi in Rottamaku Revu village, Karepalli Mandal, Khammam district. He was the second among five brothers and one sister.

== Education ==
He completed his schooling at the Government High School in Karepalli (Singareni Mandal), pursued his Intermediate (Bi.P.C.) at K.Y.K.R.Y. & B.N. Gouds Government Junior College in Kothagudem, and obtained a B.Com. degree from Seelam Siddhareddy Degree College in Khammam. Subsequently, he completed an M.A. in Telugu at Osmania University and underwent Telugu Pandit training at the Comprehensive College in Masab Tank. In 1990, he received an M.Phil. degree from the Faculty of Literature at Telugu University, Rajahmundry, for his work on the topic "Rara Margam" in Telugu literary criticism. In 2007, he was awarded a Ph.D. by Osmania University following his research on "Telugu Literary Criticism – Modern Trends."

== Family ==
He married Dr. P. Lakshmi (Shilalolita) on May 10, 1991. They have two sons, Sandeep and Sahir Bharati.

== Residence - Employment ==
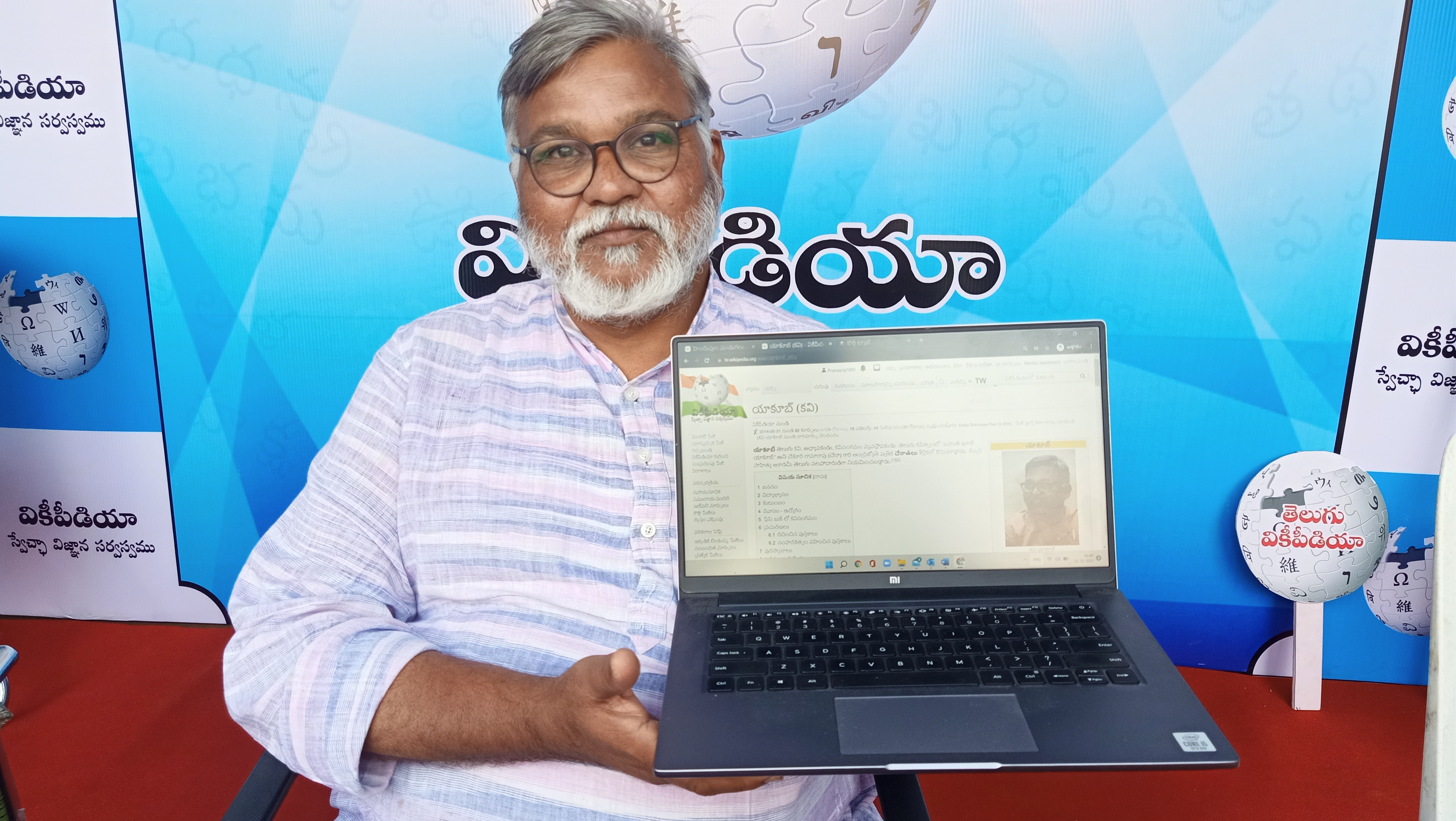
Poet Yaqoob at the Telugu Wikipedia stall at the Hyderabad National Book Fair.

He currently resides in his own home in Chaitanyapuri, Hyderabad. From 1990 to 2018, he served as the Head of the Telugu Department at Anwar-ul-Uloom College in Hyderabad. He worked at Golconda Degree College and City College during 2018, 2019, and 2020. In 2008, he served as the Controller of Examinations at Dravidian University, Kuppam, on deputation. He retired as an associate professor in March 2020 and is currently serving as the Principal of Mumtaz College in Hyderabad.

== Kavisangamam on Facebook ==
He founded and manages 'Kavisangamam,' a Telugu poetry platform that has gained immense popularity online, bringing together the works of hundreds of poets in one place. Since launching the Kavisangamam Facebook platform in 2012, he has shaped it into a hub for a new generation of poets; he organizes poetry events that facilitate interaction with senior poets, as well as Kavisangamam poetry festivals and sessions featuring direct interactions with national-level poets. He also conducts monthly programs such as 'Moodu Tharala Kavisangamam' (Three Generations of Kavisangamam) and 'Uru-ura Kavisangamam' (Kavisangamam in Every Town/Village).

== Publications ==
=== Books authored ===
- (1991) Telugu Sahityamlo Rara Margam – Research essay on Telugu literature
- (1992) Pravahinche Gnapakam – Poetry collection (2nd edition, 1997)
- (2000) Arc of Unrest – English translations of poetry
- (2002) Sarihaddu Rekha (The Boundary Line) – Poetry collection
- (2008) Telangana Sahitya Vimarsha – Literary criticism and essays on Telangana literature
- (2010) Edategani Prayanam (The Unending Journey) – Poetry collection
- (2014) Nadeemoolam Lanti Aa Illu (That House, Like the River's Source) – Poetry collection
- (2019) Teegalachinta – Poetry collection
- Pathaka Pratikriya (Reader Response) – Literary criticism
- Srujananubhavam (The Experience of Creativity) – Poetry reader/textbook
- Adhunika Telugu Sahitya Vimarsha (Modern Telugu Literary Criticism)
- Manushulra Manushulu (Humans, Oh Humans) – Poetry collection
- The Incessant Journey – English translations of poetry

=== Edited books ===
- Chalam Centenary Issue (1995)
- Devi-30 – Felicitation volume
- Devipriya: Anthology of Poems (2000)
- Gujarat Gayam (2002)
- Manachera (2003)
- Salaam Ismail – Tribute essays (2004)
- Gummam: Anthology of Poetry by Khammam Poets (2006)
- Uppala Rajamani: Life and Literature (2006)
- Kavisangamam 2012 – Anthology of poems by poets who participated in Kavisangamam in 2012
- Co-editor (with Gudipati) of Gorati Venkanna's lyrical poetry collection Alasendravanka (2010)

== Awards and honours ==
- Ranjani–Kundurthi Award (1989)
- S. V. T. Dikshitulu Award (1993)
- Amilineni Lakshmiramana Memorial Endowment Award, Telugu University (1998)
- State Best Poet Award (1998, 2002)
- Andhra Pradesh Madiga Sahitya Samakhya Award (1998)
- K. C. Gupta Literary Award (2000)
- Dr. C. Narayana Reddy Poetry Award (2003)
- Nutalapati Gangadharam Literary Award (2003)
- Telugu University Best Poetry Award (2004)
- Free Verse Front Award for Edategani Prayanam (2009)
- Ummadishetti Sahiti Award for Edategani Prayanam (2009)
- Kalabharati Award, Tirupati
- Telugu University Endowment Award, Hyderabad
- Telugu University Best Poetry Collection Award, Hyderabad
- Sahiti Manikyam Poetry Award, Khammam
- Aluri Bairagi Poetry Award, Vijayawada
- Ismail Poetry Award, Kakinada
- Jashn-e-Telangana (Urdu Writers' Forum) Award, Hyderabad
- Felicitation by the Telugu Association of North America (TANA) as a poet from Khammam district
- Sri Sri Award (Shankaram Vedika, 10 August 2017)
- Ravella Venkatarama Rao Inspiration Award
- City College Makhdoom Mohiuddin National Award (2021)
- Nayeedhara Rachana Samman, Patna (1 December 2021)
- American Telugu Association (ATA) Award (26 December 2021)
- Dr. C. Narayana Reddy Literary Award, Telangana Saraswatha Parishad (27 July 2024)
