= Madras, Chennai: A 400-year record of the first city of modern India =

Madras, Chennai: A 400-year record of the first city of modern India was a three-volume gazetteer of the city of Chennai, India which was historically known as Madras, brought about by the Association of British Scholars (ABS). The gazetteer was edited by Chennai historian S. Muthiah.

The gazetteer had a total of 50 articles authored by some of the greatest scholars in the particular domain. The book was published by Palaniappa Brothers. The British Council was one of the main sponsors of the project.

== Volumes ==
- The Land, the People and their Governance. Vol. 1. Palaniappa Brothers. 2008.
1. Geography: Susheela Raghavan, Indra Narayanan
2. Wildlife: S. Theodore Baskaran
3. Demography: C. Chandramouli
4. Hinduism: Pradeep Chakravarty
5. Islam: Komabi S. Anvar
6. Christianity: Manohar Samuel
7. Archaeology: S. Suresh
8. History (1600–1900): V. Shanmughasundaram
9. History (1900–present): G. J. Sudhakar, Dolly Thomas
10. Military History: D. P. Ramachandran
11. Governance: P. M. Belliappa
12. Administration: P. M. Belliappa
13. Political parties: S. Subramaniam
- Services, Education and the Economy. Vol. 2. Palaniappa Brothers. 2014.
- Information, Culture and Entertainment. Vol. 3. 2019.
- Index. Vol. 4.
