= Pathi Bhakthi =

1936 film by P. Y. Altekar

- Directed by: P. Y. Altekar
- Story by: Te. Po. Krishnaswamy Pavalar
- Starring: K. P. Kesavan; Radhabai; Kali N. Rathnam
- Cinematography: Jithan Banerjee
- Release date: 1936
- Country: India
- Language: Tamil

Pathi Bhakthi (transl. Devotion to husband) is a 1936 Indian Tamil-language drama film directed by P. Y. Altekar. It is based on the Madurai Original Boys Company (MOBC) theatre troupe's play of the same name. The film stars K. P. Kesavan, Radha Bai and Kali N. Rathnam.

== Cast ==
- K. P. Kesavan
- M. M. Radha Bai
- Kali N. Rathnam

== Production ==
Pathi Bhakthi was a Tamil play written by Te. Po. Krishnaswamy Pavalar in the 1930s. It dealt with the evils of drinking and the impact drinking had on family life. The play was staged across the Madras Presidency with great success. Pavalar's original play was re-written for the MOBC theatre troupe by another playwright, Madras Kandaswamy Mudaliar, and was staged more than 150 times. A. N. Marudachalam Chettiar of Manorama Films wanted to produce Pathi Bhakthi as a film, but to his dismay, another film version was already being made without him. (Note: While historian Randor Guy's 1997 book Starlight, Starbright says MOBC themselves decided to produce a film version of their play, his 2016 book Memories of Madras and historian Vamanan say that Chidambaram Chettiar of National Movietone had acquired the film rights for the play.) P. Y. Alterkar was named director. Mudaliar wanted to launch the film career of his son M. K. Radha, a theatre actor, with Pathi Bhakthi, but could not because another theatre actor, K. P. Kesavan, had been finalised for the lead role. Kali N. Ratnam made his feature film debut with this film. Radha Bai played the female lead, Jithan Banerjee handled the cinematography, and T. S. Mani was the art director.

== Reception ==
The Indian Express praised the film for the cast performances and fewer songs, but criticised its length. On 14 August 1936, a review from the Malaya Tribune applauded the film, particularly the performances of Kesavan, Ratnam and Radha Bai.

== Bibliography ==
- Guy, Randor (1997). Starlight, Starbright: The Early Tamil Cinema. Chennai: Amra Publishers. OCLC 52794531.
- Guy, Randor (2016). Gopal, T. S. (ed.). Memories of Madras: Its Movies, Musicians & Men of Letters. Chennai: Creative Workshop. ISBN 978-81-928961-7-5.
