= S. Muthiah =

Indian journalist

Subbiah Muthiah MBE
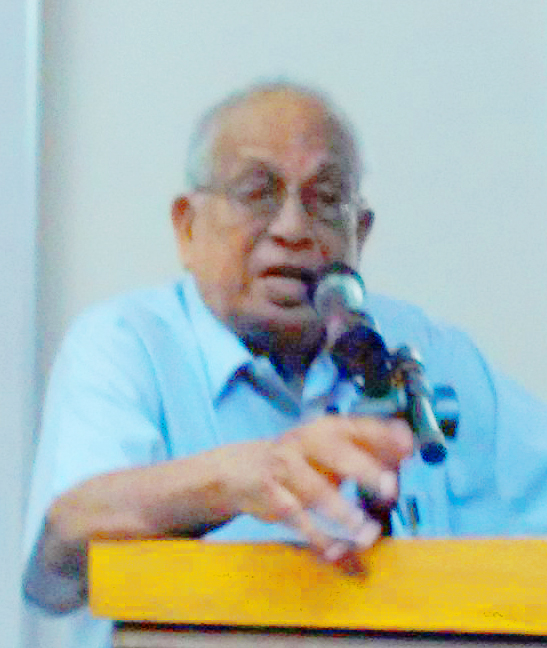
- S. Muthiah speaking at a Madras Day 2015 presentation on "The story of photography in Madras"
- Born: Muthiah; 13 April 1930; Pallathur, Madura District, Madras Presidency, British India
- Died: 20 April 2019 (aged 89); Chennai, Tamil Nadu, India
- Occupation: journalist
- Employer: T. T. K. Maps
- Known for: books on the History of Chennai, conservation activities
- Spouse: Valliammai Muthiah (1950–2013) m. 1969 till her death
- Children: Ranjani, Parvathi

Subbiah Muthiah, MBE (13 April 1930 – 20 April 2019), was an Indian writer, journalist, cartographer, amateur historian and heritage activist known for his writings on the political and cultural history of Chennai city. He was the founder of the fortnightly newspaper Madras Musings and the principal organizer of the annual Madras Day celebrations. Muthiah was also the founder-President of the Madras Book Club.

== Early life and education ==
Muthiah was born in Pallathur in the Ramnad district of Madras Presidency, British India in a Nagarathar family on 13 April 1930. He is the son of V.Vr.N.M. Subbiah Chettiar, an influential businessman and politician. Muthiah had his early schooling in Ladies' College, S. Thomas' Preparatory School and Royal College in Colombo and completed his matriculation in India in 1946. Between 1946 and 1951, Muthiah studied arts and engineering in the United States of America and returned to Ceylon after obtaining his master's degree in International Relations in 1951.

== With The Times of Ceylon ==
On his return to Ceylon, Muthiah took up a job with The Times of Ceylon and served the newspaper for 17 years eventually rising to the second position in the newspaper's hierarchy and heading the weekly Sunday edition. When the citizenship laws of the country were amended in 1968, Muthiah, who was not yet a citizen of Ceylon lost his job and had to move to India.

== In India ==
Muthiah settled down in the city of Madras and took up a job with T. T. K. Maps, a newly formed cartographic division of T. T. K. Healthcare Ltd where he was tasked with preparation of tourist guides and books on South India. In 1981, Muthiah wrote his first book Madras Discovered based on the research he had done to prepare tourist guides on Madras city. He followed it with two more books on Madras and one each on Parry's and Simpson's Ltd.

== Post-retirement ==
On his retirement from T. T. K. Maps in 1990, Muthiah took up writing full-time and founded the fortnightly newspaper Madras Musings. Muthiah also involved himself in heritage activism for Madras city and wrote regular columns for Indian newspapers most prominently The Hindu. In 1999, Muthiah co-founded Chennai Heritage, a foundation for heritage conservation in Chennai. Muthiah was also one of the brains behind the annual Madras Day celebrations held in Chennai city on the anniversary of the founding of the settlement of Fort St. George by Andrew Cogan and Francis Day on 22 August 1639.

The history of the United Planters' Association of Southern India (UPASI) titled A Planting Century: The First Hundred Years of the United Planters' Association of Southern India, 1893-1993, was written by Muthiah during the organisation's centenary in 1993.

In 2011, Muthiah published the book Madras Miscellany, a collection of articles from weekly columns of the same name that he had written for The Hindu since 19 November 1999. Muthiah also volunteered to edit the gazetteer on Chennai that was commissioned by the British Council through the Association of British Scholars, India Chapter. Volume one of the 3-volume gazetteer titled Madras, Chennai: A 400-year record of the first city of modern India on "The Land, People and Governance" and volume two on "Services, Education and the Economy" were published in 2008 and 2014 respectively and a third on "Information, Culture and Entertainment" is under preparation.

== Honors ==
On 7 March 2002, Muthiah was made a "Honorary Member of the Civil Division of the Most Excellent Order of the British Empire". The award was presented to him by Michael Herrige, British High Commissioner to India at a function in Chennai. The citation read that the award was presented for "service by those who are not British citizens but who have pursued ideals which Britain values and shares".

== Personal life ==
Muthiah's father, N. M. Subbiah Chettiar (1905–2002) was a stockbroker and politician who served as a mayor of Colombo, British Ceylon and was one of the founders of the Ceylon India Congress formed in 1939. He even stood for elections for the House of Representatives of Ceylon from the Nuwara Eliya constituency in 1947 and lost.

Muthiah married Valliammai Achi (1950–2013) in 1969. The couple had two daughters Ranjani and Parvathy. Valliammai worked as a Company Secretary till her death in 2013. Muthiah lived in Chennai where he spent most of his day on his desk. After spending the evening at the Madras Club, he used to retire to his home, where he had two glasses of Indian whisky before dinner.

== Criticism ==
At the inauguration of the 2009 edition of the Chennai Book Fair, M. Karunanidhi, Chief Minister of Tamil Nadu regretted the fact that Muthiah's book Madras Rediscovered did not make even a passing mention of the tenures of C. N. Annadurai or himself.

== Works ==
- Muthiah, S. (1981). Madras Discovered. East West Books (Madras) Pvt Ltd.
- Ramaswami, N. S.; Muthiah, S. (1988). Parrys 200: A saga of resilience. East West Books (Madras) Pvt Ltd.
- Muthiah, S. (1989). Tales of old and new Madras: the dalliance of Miss Mansell and 34 other stories of 350 years. East West Books (Madras) Pvt Ltd.
- Muthiah, S. (1990). Madras, the gracious city. East West Books (Madras) Pvt Ltd.
- Muthiah, S. (1990). Getting India on the Move: The 150 Year Saga of Simpsons of Madras. Higginbotham's.
- Muthiah, S. (1991). Words in Indian English: A reader's guide. Indus.
- Muthiah, S.; Khullar, Rupinder (1992). The Splendor of South India. UBS Publishers' Distributors.
- Muthiah, S. (1993). A planting century: the first hundred years of the United Planters' Association of Southern India, 1893–1993. East West Books (Madras) Pvt Ltd.
- Muthiah, S. (1995). Madras, its past and present. East West Books (Madras) Pvt Ltd. ISBN 978-81-85938-24-0.
- Muthiah, S. (1997). The Spencer Legend. East West Books (Madras) Pvt Ltd.
- Muthiah, S. (1998). The spirit of Chepauk: the MCC story, a 150 year sporting tradition. East West Books (Madras) Pvt Ltd.
- Muthiah, S. (2000). Looking back from "Moulmein": a biography of A.M.M. Arunachalam. East West Books (Madras) Pvt Ltd.
- Muthiah, S. (2000). Madras that is Chennai, Queen of the Coromandel. Business Publications Inc.
- Muthiah, S. (2004). Madras Rediscovered. East West Books (Madras) Pvt Ltd.
- Muthiah, S. (2004). Changing Chennai: a symposium on the queen of the Coromandel. Singh.
- Muthiah, S.; Gopalan, K. N. (2008). Moving India on wheels: The story of Ashok Leyland. Ashok Leyland.
- Muthiah, S. (2008). Born to dare: the life of Lt. Gen. Inderjit Singh Gill, PVSM, MC. Penguin Books. ISBN 978-0-670-08188-2.
- Muthiah, S.; Sathyanarayanan, S.; Satish, Swapna; Sathasivam, Kumaran (2009). The Raj Bhavans of Tamil Nadu. South Zone Cultural Centre.
- Muthiah, S. (2011). Madras Miscellany: A decade of People, Places and Potpurri. Tranquebar Press. ISBN 978-93-8003-284-9.
