= Madras Rediscovered =

1981 book by S. Muthiah

Madras Rediscovered: A Historical Guide to Looking Around Supplemented with Tales of Once Upon a City
- 3rd edition, published 1992 with original title Madras Discovered
- Author: S. Muthiah
- Original title: Madras Discovered
- Language: English
- Subject: History of Chennai
- Publisher: East-West Books (India) Ltd
- Publication date: 1981
- Publication place: India

Madras Rediscovered: A Historical Guide to Looking Around Supplemented with Tales of Once Upon a City is a book on the history of Madras (now Chennai) by historian S. Muthiah. Originally titled Madras Discovered, the first edition was published in 1981. Since then, the book has emerged a bestseller and has run into eight editions. A Tamil translation of the book Chennai Marukandupidippu by C. V. Karthik Narayan was published in 2009.

== Editions ==
The first edition titled Madras Discovered was published in 1981 by East-West Books. It was 160 pages long and priced at Rs. 10. The second edition of Madras Discovered, 286 pages long was published in 1987 followed by the third edition in 1993, 363 pages long, which was augmented by a supplement titled "Once Upon a City". The fourth edition which came in 1999 was titled Madras Rediscovered. The fifth edition which came in 2004 was priced at Rs. 360 and was 427 pages long.

== Reception ==
Journalist Bishwanath Ghosh considers Muthiah's Madras Rediscovered, the "last word on the city's heritage".
