= Madras Musings =

English-language newspaper on the history and heritage of Chennai city

- Type: Fortnightly newspaper
- Format: Tabloid
- Owner: Chennai Heritage
- Publisher: S. Muthiah
- Editor-in-chief: S. Muthiah
- Editor: V. Sriram
- Founded: 1991
- Language: English
- Headquarters: Chennai, Tamil Nadu, India
- Website: madrasmusings.com

Madras Musings is a fortnightly English-language newspaper founded by Chennai historian S. Muthiah in 1991. Published in tabloid format and comprising 18 to 22 pages, the newspaper generally features articles on the history and heritage of Chennai city.

== History ==
Madras Musings was founded by S. Muthiah in 1991 soon after his retirement from TTK Maps Ltd. The paper was conceived as a tool to showcase the history and heritage of the then Madras city, which was renamed "Chennai" in 1997. Originally comprising five pages, the paper was later increased to over ten pages. Chennai Heritage, a non-profit organization was formed in 1999 to support the conservation and preservation of the historic heritage of Chennai city and registered as per Section 25 of the Companies Act with Muthiah as one of the company's directors. Since then, Madras Musings has been financed by Chennai Heritage and functions as its official mouthpiece.

== Sponsors ==
The newspaper is sponsored by eighteen prominent corporate houses and hundreds of individual donors. The publishing and marketing of the newspaper has been handled by Chennai Heritage.
