= Vamanan =

Indian writer, journalist, and film music historian

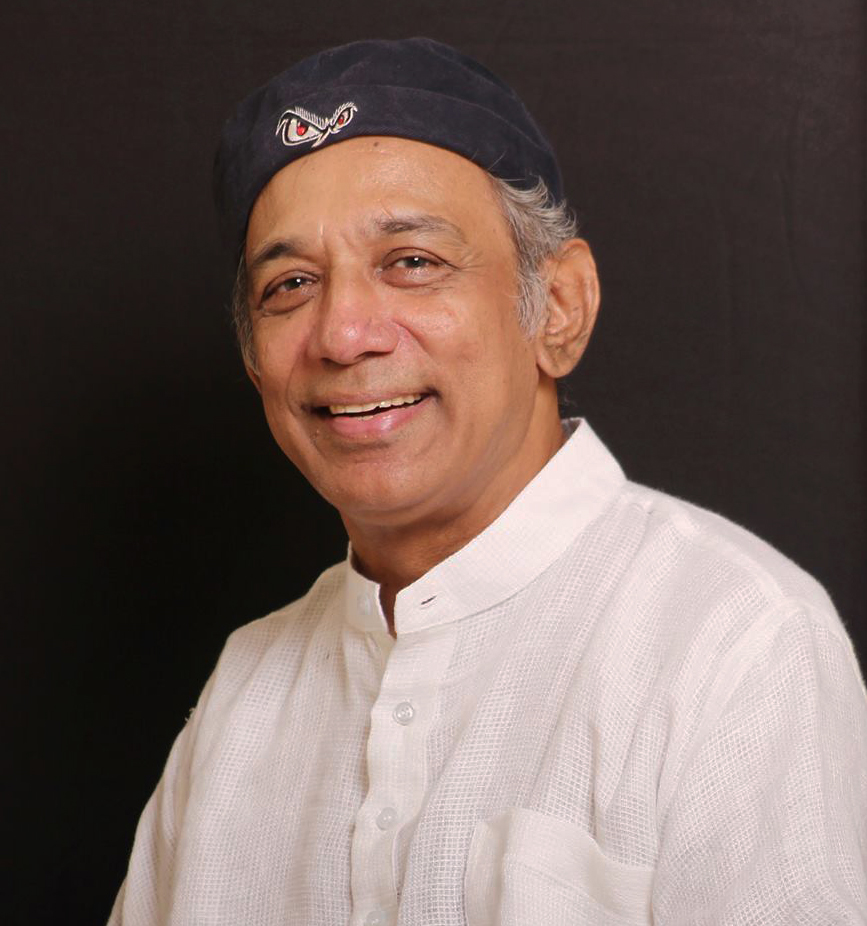
- Occupations: Film music historian, author, documentary film-maker, journalist
- Notable work: Thirai Isai Alaigal

Vamanan is an Indian writer, journalist, documentary film-maker and film music historian based in Chennai. He is known for his documentation of the lives of Tamil film music composers, singing stars and playback singers. Vamanan was awarded the Tamil Nadu government's Kalaimamani award (2005) by Chief Minister Jayalalithaa for his contribution to Tamil film history and won the first prize of the Government of Tamil Nadu Tamil development department for the first volume of Thirai Isai Alaigal (2000).

== Career ==
Vamanan worked in newspapers including The Hindu, The Indian Express and India Today in the editorial. He was film critic of The Indian Express in the eighties. His first book was Thirai Isai Alaigal. Subsequently, four more volumes of Thirai Isai Alaigal have been released. His biography of singer T. M. Soundararajan titled "TMS - Oru pann-pattu charithiram" traces the Soundararajan's life while exploring more than thirty years of film world history. His work Mellisai Mannargal Paattu Payanam is on the work of Viswanathan–Ramamoorthy (a duo consisting of M. S. Viswanathan and T. K. Ramamoorthy) in their individual capacities. The book was released by Justice S. Mohan and the first copy was received by film producer M. Saravanan.

== Selected bibliography ==
Year	Book	Language(s)	Publication
1999	Thirai Isai Alaigal	Tamil	Manivachagar Pathippagam
2000	Vajpayee Kavithaigal (A translation from Hindi of Vajpayee's poems)	Tamil	Manivachagar Pathippagam
2002	TMS – Oru Pann-Paattu Charithiram	Tamil	Manivachagar Pathippagam
2003	Thirai Isai Alaigal Part 3, Calcutta Netru Indru Naalai	Tamil	Manivachagar Pathippagam
2004	Mellisai Mannargal Paattu Payanam, Thirai Isai Alaigal Part 4	Tamil	Manivachagar Pathippagam
2005	Siva Darshan	English	A Tattvaloka Publication
2006	Sangitha Chakravarthy G. Ramanathan	Tamil	Manivachagar Pathippagam
2007	Vallalar – A pictorial biography	Tamil	Manivachagar Pathippagam
2011	Thirai Isai Alaigal Part 5	Tamil	Manivachagar Pathippagam
2012	Gundusi B.R.S.Gopal – A life and anthology	Tamil	Manivachagar Pathippagam
2014	Thirai Isai Kalanjiam (1278 page Omnibus edition of five volumes of Thirai Isai Alaigal)	Tamil	Manivachagar Pathippagam
2015	Mannavan Vandhaanadi (Part 1 of K.V.Mahadevan biography)	Tamil	Manivachagar Pathippagam
