= Chennai Book Fair =

Annual book fair organized in Chennai, India

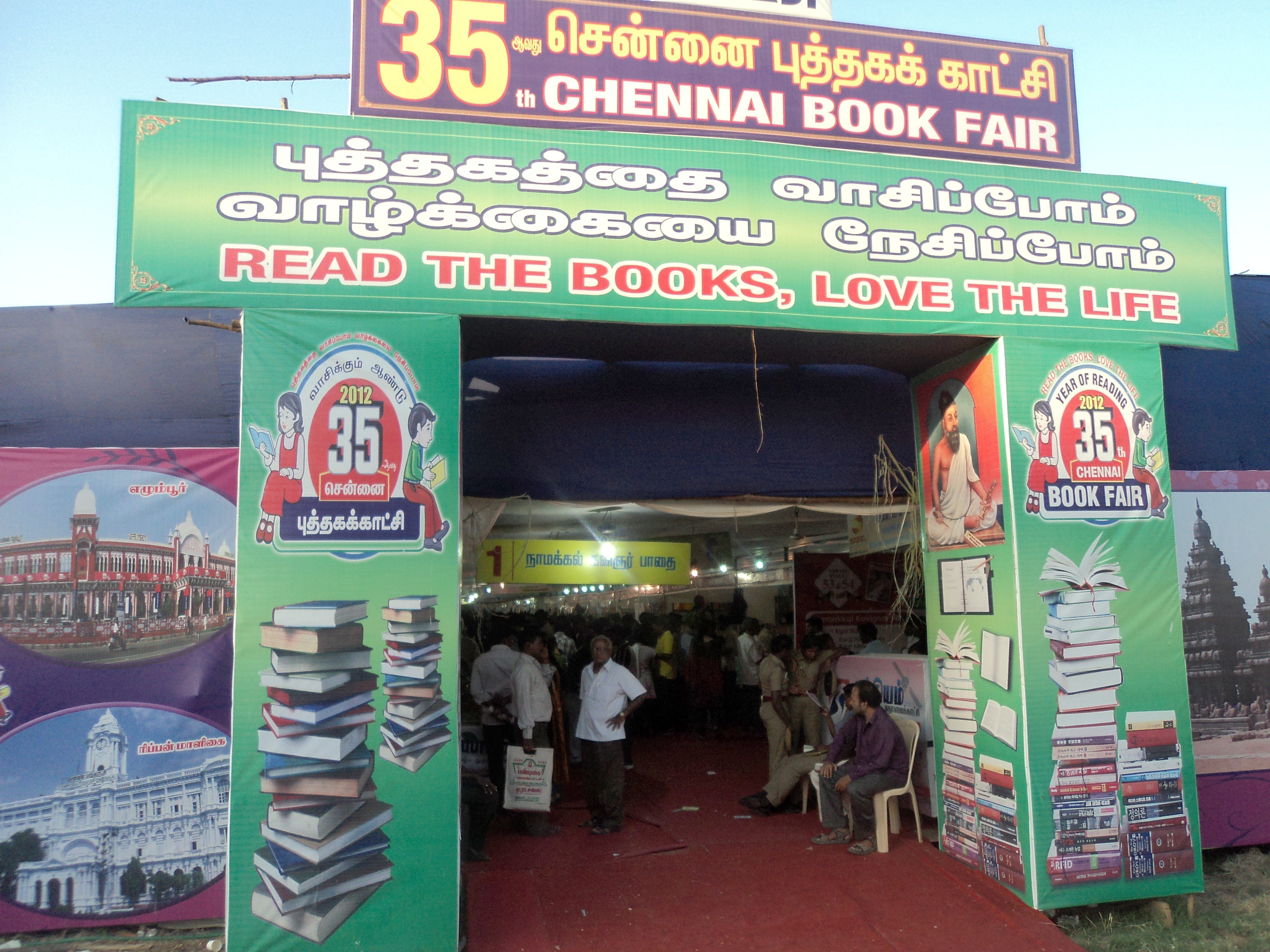
- Book Fair Entrance
- Status: Active
- Genre: Fair
- Frequency: Annually
- Venue: YMCA Grounds, Nandanam; Chennai Trade Centre, Nandambakkam (CIBF)
- Locations: Chennai, Tamil Nadu, India
- Coordinates: 13.0238°N 80.2363°E
- Years active: 49
- Most recent: 12 January 2025
- Organiser: Booksellers and Publishers Association of South India (BAPASI)
- Website: bapasi.com; cibf.com

Chennai Book Fair (earlier Madras Book Fair) is an annual book fair organized in Chennai, India by the Booksellers and Publishers Association of South India (BAPASI). The fair typically lasts for about two weeks during the New Year-Pongal season, that is between the last week of December and the third week of January. It is the second largest book fair in the country after the Kolkata Book Fair. All major Tamil and English publishing houses participate in this fair. It is considered an important event in the Chennai cultural calendar along with the Chennai music season.

The 47th edition (2024) was held from 3 January 2024 to 21 January 2024, including the second edition of the Chennai International Book Fair from 16 January 2024 to 18 January 2024.

== History ==
The First Madras Book Fair was organized in Madras between 14 and 24 December 1977, by The Booksellers and Publishers Association of South India (BAPASI), an association of major publishing companies of Tamil Nadu. The first Madras Book Fair had 22 stalls and was held at the Madrasa-i-Azam school due to the initiative of K. V. Mathew of B. I. Publications. He is also credited with planning and organisation of the next five editions of the fair. Mathew has also organized an annual book fair for students. The Student Book Fair, however, hasn't been as successful as the Chennai Book Fair.

The book fairs gradually rose in popularity. At the 12th Madras Book Fair held between 22 December 1989, and 1 January 1990, Tamil translations of WHO publications were put on sale. The success of the Chennai Book Fair prompted BAPASI to start similar book fairs at Udagamandalam, Thiruvananthapuram, Pondicherry and Tiruchirapalli.

The 24th Chennai Book Fair experienced a spurt in the number of Tamil language publishers. Of the 180 publication houses who participated in the book fair, 80 were Tamil publication houses, a remarkable increase since the 23rd fair in which there was only one stall devoted to Tamil publications. The book fair celebrated its silver jubilee in 2002 coinciding with the 50th anniversary celebrations of BAPASI. The fair was held for 15 days instead of the usual 11-day affair. In 2007, due to traffic congestion and the need for more space for the stalls, the venue for the annual book fair was changed from Quaid-e-Milleth Women's College to St. George' School in Kilpauk. In the 32nd edition held in 2009, the number of visitors crossed the one-million mark. In 2013, due to construction work on the Chennai Metro, the venue of the book fair was shifted to the YMCA grounds in Nandanam.

In 2016, following the 2015 South Indian floods, for the first time, the book fair was rescheduled to be held in May. Instead, an alternate low-key Pongal Book Fair was held between 13 and 24 January for book lovers and tourists.

The early editions were held in the last weeks of December and ended in the first week of January in order to coincide with the Christmas-New Year holidays. However, in the late nineties, the fair was moved to mid-January to coincide with the Pongal festive season.

== Recent editions ==
=== 32nd edition ===
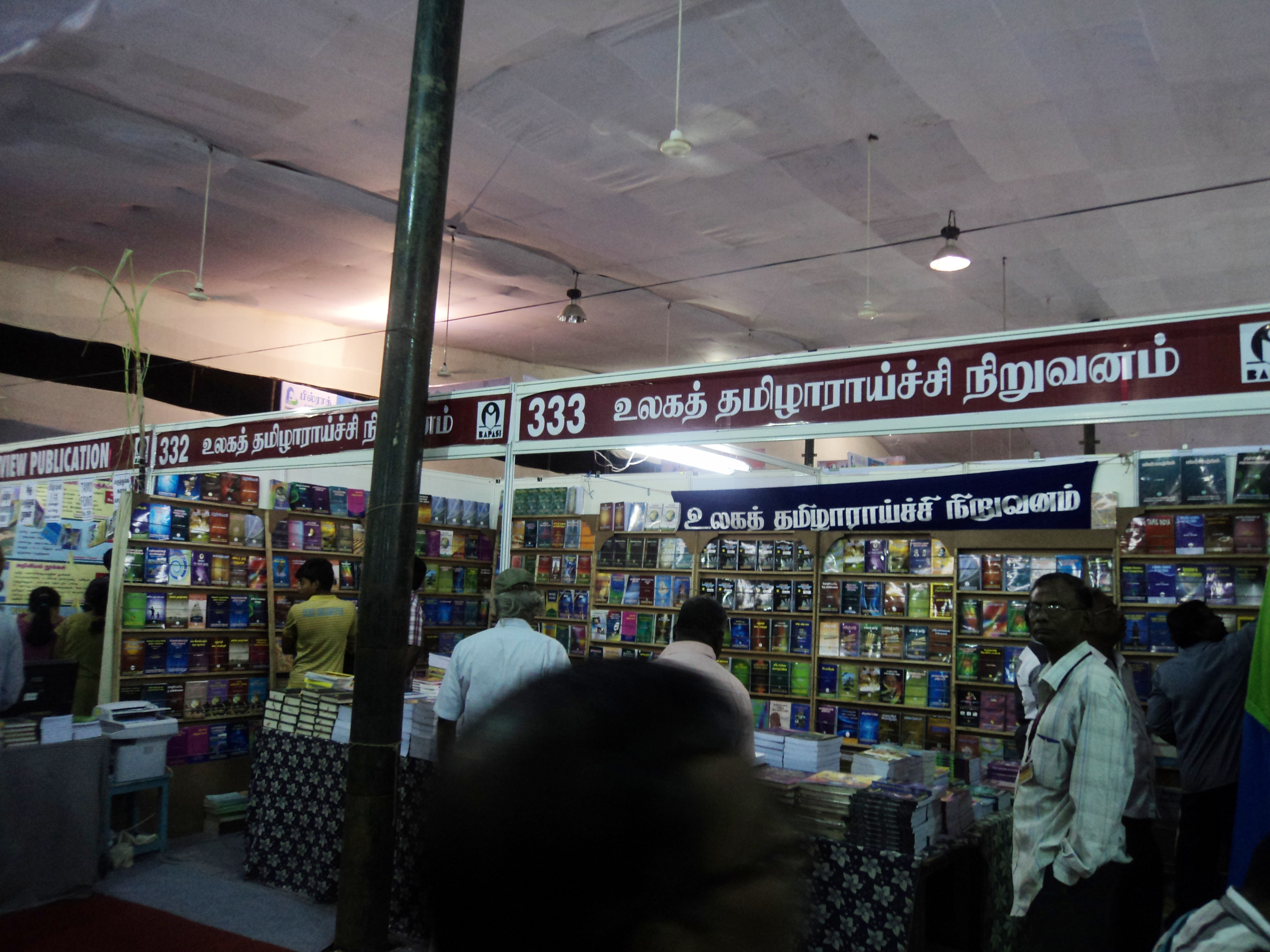
35th Chennai Book Fair, 2012

The 32nd Chennai Book Fair was inaugurated at St George's Anglo-Indian School, Poonamallee High Road, Chennai, by former President of India Abdul Kalam on 8 January 2009. and lasted ten days. The 2009 edition had over 600 stalls and was attended by over one million people, amongst whom were Chennai historian S. Muthiah, businessman Nalli Kuppuswami Chetti and Gnani Sankaran. Second-hand pavement shops outside the fair also did a good business. Book publishers made a cumulative sale of approximately ₹ 70 million.

The 14-day fair was held at St. George's Anglo Indian School on Poonamallee High Road. The fair included 646 stalls, spread over 150,000 square feet (14,000 m^{2}). Over 1 million titles were on sale. Book publishers from New Delhi, Agra, Hyderabad, Bangalore and various parts of Tamil Nadu participated in the fair.

=== 36th edition ===
The 36th Chennai Book Fair was held between 11 and 23 January 2013, at YMCA Physical Education College Ground, Nandanam due to the construction of CMRL (Chennai Metro Rail) at E.V.R. Periyar Salai. It had 747 stalls in a 180,000-square-foot (17,000 m^{2}) area, with 450 participants and 1 million titles.

=== 39th edition ===
The 39th edition of Chennai Book Fair was not conducted in January 2016 due to the flood happened in Dec 2015. The planned venue (YMCA Grounds, Nandanam) was still inundated during the last weeks of December and the organisers did not have enough time to replan the venue to keep up with the schedule. Many book sellers and distributors got affected as their valuable stocks were damaged in the floods. The local publishers suffered a loss of approximately 250 million. The Book Fair was postponed initially to April 2016 and then rescheduled to 1–13 June 2016. A book fair was however held between 13 and 24 January 2016 at YMCA Royapettah organised by Tamil Nadu Book Sales and Promotions Association with 225 stalls.

=== 45th edition ===
The 45th edition of the book fair, which was scheduled to begin from 6 January 2022, was postponed due to surge in COVID-19 cases. The sales went up over 12 crores in the fair. The State government's "Illam Thedi Kalvi" initiative, a scientific exhibition, a Keezhadi photo gallery, and a display of vintage ceramic artifacts were all represented during this year's fair. Another highlight of the event was the sculptures of notable leaders. There were sculptures of former CM M Karunanidhi, well-known Tamil poet Tiruvalluvar, Buddha, former President APJ Abdul Kalam, Dravidian icon "Periyar" EV Ramasamy, and other luminaries available for purchase.

== Venue ==
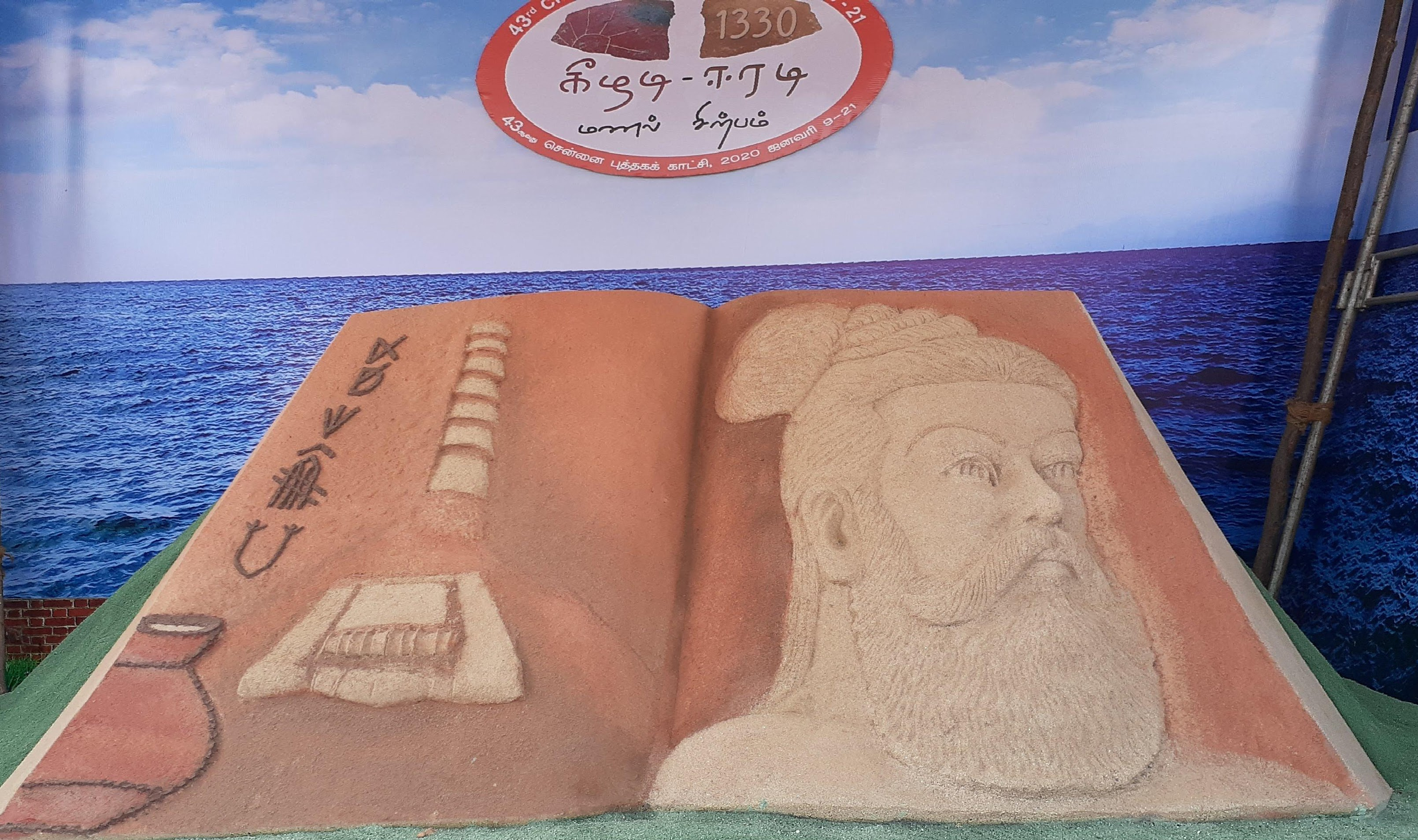
Sand sculpture of Valluvar at the Chennai Book Fair 2020

The first four editions of the book fair were held in the Madrasa-i-Azam school. In 1981, the book fair moved to the YMCA grounds in Royapettah, Chennai. The 1982 edition was organized at the erstwhile Woodlands Drive-In restaurant. The book fair was subsequently moved to the Quaid-e-Milleth Government Arts College for Women in the late 1980s. The Quaid-e-Milleth Government Arts College for Women remained the venue of the book fair till 2007, when the venue was shifted to St. George Anglo-Indian High Secondary School on the Poonamallee High Road due to space and parking constraints.

== Features ==
The Chennai Book Fair is considered to be one of the biggest events in the Chennai cultural calendar along with the Chennai music season. In addition to book stalls, there are food and refreshment stalls to serve the needs of hungry visitors. Regular debates, contests and speeches are held at the venue. In recent times, movie clippings of films of international renown are filmed at the venue of the fair. Annual awards to the best writer and the best publisher are given at the fair.

| Year | Edition | Venue | Area | Number of stalls | Participants | Visitors | Days held | Revenue | Ref. |
|---|---|---|---|---|---|---|---|---|---|
| 1977 | 1 | Madrasa-I-Azam school | | 22 | | | | | |
| 2001 | 24 | Quaid-e-Milleth Women's College | | | 180 | | 11 days | | |
| 2002 | 25 | Quaid-e-Milleth Women's College | | | | | 15 days | | |
| 2003 | 26 | Quaid-e-Milleth Women's College | | 272 | | 300,000 | 9–19 January (11 days) | ₹ 60 million | |
| 2004 | 27 | Quaid-e-Milleth Women's College | | 310 | 200 | 540,000 | 9–19 January (11 days) | | |
| 2005 | 28 | Quaid-e-Milleth Women's College | | | | 700,000 | 7–17 January (11 days) | ₹ 60 million | |
| 2006 | 29 | Quaid-e-Milleth Women's College | | 375 | | | 6–16 January (11 days) | | |
| 2007 | 30 | St. George's School, Kilpauk | | 474 | | 600,000 | | | |
| 2008 | 31 | St. George's School, Kilpauk | | | | 700,000 | | | |
| 2009 | 32 | St. George's School, Kilpauk | | 600+ | | Over 1,000,000 | 8–17 January (10 days) | ₹ 70 million | |
| 2010 | 33 | St. George's School, Kilpauk | | | | | | | |
| 2011 | 34 | St. George's School, Kilpauk | 150,000 sq ft | 646 | | | | | |
| 2012 | 35 | St. George's School, Kilpauk | 100,000 sq ft | 687 | | | 5–17 January (13 days) | | |
| 2013 | 36 | YMCA Physical Education College Ground, Nandanam | 180,000 sq ft | 746 | 450 | 900,000 | 11–23 January (13 days) | ₹ 120 million | |
| 2014 | 37 | YMCA Physical Education College Ground, Nandanam | 200,000 sq ft | 777 | | | 10–22 January (13 days) | | |
| 2015 | 38 | YMCA Physical Education College Ground, Nandanam | 200,000 sq ft | 700 | | | 9–21 January (13 days) | | |
| 2016 | 39 | Island Grounds, The Island, Chennai | | 700 | | | 1–13 June (13 days) | | |
| 2017 | 40 | St. George's School, Chennai, Kilpauk | | 700 | | | 6–19 January (13 days) | | |
| 2018 | 41 | St. George's School, Chennai, Kilpauk | | 708 | 428 | | 10–22 January (13 days) | | |
| 2019 | 42 | YMCA Physical Education College Ground, Nandanam | | 804 | 400 | | 4-20 January (17 days) | | |
| 2020 | 43 | YMCA Physical Education College Ground, Nandanam | | | | | 9-21 January (13 days) | | |
| 2021 | 44 | YMCA Physical Education College Ground, Nandanam | 153,600 sq ft | 578 | 376 (including 25 sponsors) | 800,000 | 24 February–9 March (14 days) | ₹ 120 million | |
| 2022 | 45 | YMCA Physical Education College Ground, Nandanam | | 800 | | | 16 February–6 March (19 days) | | |
| 2023 | 46 | YMCA Physical Education College Ground, Nandanam | | 1000 | Includes 1st edition of Chennai International Book Fair | 1,500,000 | 6 January–22 January (17 days) | ₹ 160 million | |
| 2024 | 47 | YMCA Physical Education College Ground, Nandanam | | 915 | | 2,000,000 | 3 January-21 January (19 days) | ₹18 crore (US$1.9 million) | |
| 2025 | 48 | YMCA Physical Education College Ground, Nandanam | | 900 | | | 27 December 2024 – 12 January 2025 (18 days) | | |
| 2026 | 49 | YMCA Physical Education College Ground, Nandanam | | 1000+ | | | 8 January 2026 – 21 January 2026 | | |

== Website ==
- Official website
