= A. G. Rathnamala =

Indian playback singer (1931–2007)

- Born: A. G. Rathnamala; 1931; Madras Presidency, British India
- Died: 3 July 2007 (aged 75–76) Chennai, Tamil Nadu, India.
- Genre: Film music (playback singing)
- Occupations: Singer, actor
- Instrument: Vocalist
- Years active: 1950–1964

A. G. Rathnamala (Tamil: ஏ. ஜி. ரத்தினமாலா) (1931 – 3 July 2007) was an Indian stage drama artist and playback singer who has recorded over 500 songs in Tamil, Telugu, Malayalam and Kannada language films.

== Career life ==
=== Stage Drama ===
When she was in the drama troupe of M. G. Ramachandran, she acted as his pair of in the drama named Inba Kanavu. Apart from this she acted along with T. R. Mahalingam in the drama Or Iravu. She was also acted with K. R. Ramasamy's drama troupe.

The 1952 film En Thangai was based on T. S. Natarajan's play of the same name. Sivaji Ganesan was the hero in the stage drama and she performed as his younger sister. Later she joined Sivaji Ganesan's drama troupe and enacted the role of Jakkamma in the drama Veerapandiya Kattbomman.

=== Music composers she sang for ===
- G. Ramanathan
- S. M. Subbaiah Naidu
- C. R. Subburaman
- M. S. Gnanamani
- G. Govindarajulu Naidu
- S. Dakshinamurthi
- C. N. Pandurangan
- T. R. Pappa
- N. S. Balakrishnan
- R. Sudarsanam
- V. Dakshinamoorthy
- R. Govardhanam
- T. A. Kalyanam
- M. S. Viswanathan
- K. V. Mahadevan
- K. N. Dandayudhapani Pillai
- Ghantasala
- S. V. Venkatraman
- T. R. Ramanathan
- S. Rajeswara Rao
- Viswanathan–Ramamoorthy
- P. Adinarayana Rao
- T. G. Lingappa
- G. Ashwathama
- Pendyala Nageswara Rao
- S. Hanumantha Rao
- Meenakshi Subramanyam
- M. Ranga Rao
- H. R. Padmanabha Sastri
- Vedha

=== Playback singers she sang with ===
She had many solo songs but also sang with other singers. She was very popular with comedy songs. She sang immemorable duets mostly with S. C. Krishnan. She also sang with all the comedian singers such as J. P. Chandrababu, Thiruchi Loganathan, K. R. Chellamuthu, A. L. Raghavan, C. S. Pandiyan, S. V. Ponnusamy, K. Sarangapani, V. T. Rajagopalan, C. Thangkappan, Madhavapeddi Satyam, Pithapuram Nageswara Rao & K. H. Reddy. Others are T. M. Soundararajan, Seerkazhi Govindarajan, C. S. Jayaraman, C. R. Subburaman, V. J. Varma, S. V. Ramanan and G. K. Venkatesh.

She also sang duets with female singers with most notably with K. Jamuna Rani, A. P. Komala & P. Leela. Others include M. L. Vasanthakumari, Jikki, M. S. Rajeswari, T. V. Rathnam, K. Rani, T. S. Bagavathi, Soolamangalam Jayalakshmi, Soolamangalam Rajalakshmi, P. A. Periyanayaki, N. L. Ganasaraswathi, U. R. Chandra, S. J. Kantha, G. Kasthoori, Sundaramma, Kamala, Gomathi, Udutha Sarojini & M. S. Padma.

The singing actors she sang with were T. R. Mahalingam, J. P. Chandrababu, N. S. Krishnan, T. A. Mathuram. C. S. Pandiyan, P. Bhanumathi and K. Sarangapani.

== Filmography ==
Year	Film	Language	Song	Music director	Co-singer
1950	Digambara Samiyar	Tamil	Kaakka Vendum Kadavule Nee	G. Ramanathan & S. M. Subbaiah Naidu	U. R. Chandra
1950	Macha Rekai	Tamil	Nilaiyillatha Ulagamithe	C. R. Subburaman	
1951	Devaki	Tamil	Hello My Dear Hello	G. Ramanathan	Thiruchi Loganathan
1951	Devaki	Tamil	Tea Tea Soodaana Tea	G. Ramanathan	Jikki
1951	Rajambal	Tamil	Oru Dhinusaa Irukudhu	M. S. Gnanamani	K. Sarangapani
1952	Andhaman Kaidhi	Tamil	I Love You.... Aasaiyaanene Un Mele	G. Govindarajulu Naidu	J. P. Chandrababu
1952	Athinti Kapuram	Telugu		S. Dakshinamurthi	
1952	En Thangai	Tamil	Good Luck Good Luck	C. N. Pandurangan	C. S. Pandiyan
1952	Kalyani	Tamil		S. Dakshinamurthi	
1952	Mappillai	Tamil	Dosu Kodukka Venum	T. R. Pappa & N. S. Balakrishnan	Thiruchi Loganathan
1952	Mappillai	Tamil	Raja Kudumbatthil	T. R. Pappa & N. S. Balakrishnan	Thiruchi Loganathan
1952	Mappillai	Tamil	Naanoru Ragasiyam	T. R. Pappa & N. S. Balakrishnan	
1952	Velaikaran	Tamil	Maane Marikozhundhe	R. Sudarsanam	M. S. Rajeswari, T. S. Bagavathi & Soolamangalam Rajalakshmi
1953	Asai Magan	Tamil	Akkam Pakkam	V. Dakshinamoorthy	Thiruchi Loganathan
1953	Jatagam	Tamil	Aandavan Namakku	R. Govardhanam	G. K. Venkatesh
1953	Jenova	Tamil	Seiyaamale Seiven Endru	T. A. Kalyanam, M. S. Gnanamani & M. S. Viswanathan	
1953	Marumagal	Tamil	Aaanukkoru Pennpillai	G. Ramanathan, C. R. Subburaman & Viswanathan–Ramamoorthy	P. A. Periyanayaki & A. P. Komala
1954	Naalvar	Tamil	Agapattu Kondaayaa	K. V. Mahadevan	U. R. Chandra
1954	Pona Machaan Thirumbi Vandhan	Tamil	Pennai Veettil Pootti	C. N. Pandurangan & M. S. Viswanathan	P. Leela
1954	Pona Machaan Thirumbi Vandhan	Tamil	Kodutthudu Neeyaa Kodutthudu	C. N. Pandurangan & M. S. Viswanathan	K. R. Chellamuthu
1954	Pudhu Yugam	Tamil	Jaadhiyile Naanga Thaazhndhavanga	G. Ramanathan	Jikki, A. P. Komala & N. L. Ganasaraswathi
1954	Thuli Visham	Tamil	Manamillaa Malarukkor Magimai Illai	K. N. Dandayudhapani Pillai	P. Leela
1954	Raja Garuvu	Telugu	Yevaroyi Veeru Yevaroyi	K. N. Dandayudhapani Pillai	V. J. Varma
1954	Raja Garuvu	Telugu	Aa Dhaivamu Karunaanidi	K. N. Dandayudhapani Pillai	
1955	Doctor Savithri	Tamil	Maayi Mahamaayi.... Aadhi Parameswariye	G. Ramanathan	T. M. Soundararajan
1955	Gulebakavali	Tamil	Paaraanda Mannar Ellam.... Achu Nimirndha Vandi	Viswanathan–Ramamoorthy	J. P. Chandrababu
1955	Kaveri	Tamil	Kaaveri Thanneer Pattaal Kanniyar Meni Thangam	G. Ramanathan & Viswanathan–Ramamoorthy	P. Leela
1955	Kaveri	Tamil	Ezhettu Naalaagathaan	G. Ramanathan & Viswanathan–Ramamoorthy	N. S. Krishnan, T. A. Mathuram, A. P. Komala, Jikki & S. J. Kantha
1955	Maheswari	Tamil	Sonnaa Podhum Kannaale	G. Ramanathan	S. C. Krishnan
1955	Maheswari	Tamil	Janakku Janakku Jinjanakku	G. Ramanathan	S. C. Krishnan
1955	Maheswari	Tamil	Mundhi Mundhi Vinaayagane	G. Ramanathan	S. C. Krishnan
1955	Maheswari	Tamil	Aagaaya Veediyile Annaandhu Paathapadi	G. Ramanathan	S. C. Krishnan
1955	Maheswari	Tamil	Ulagatthu Naauagiye Engal Mutthu Mariyammaa	G. Ramanathan	
1955	Mangaiyar Thilakam	Tamil	Purindhu Kollavillai Innum	S. Dakshinamurthi	S. C. Krishnan
1955	Nalla Thangai	Tamil	Maappillai Makku Maappillai	G. Ramanathan	P. Leela
1955	Nalla Thangal	Tamil	Komala Sezhunthaamarai Ezhil Meviye	G. Ramanathan	P. Leela, A. P. Komala, T. V. Rathnam & Udutha Sarojini
1955	Ulagam Palavitham	Tamil	Ulagam Palavitham Ayya	N. S. Balakrishnan	P. Leela & K. Rani
1956	Ellam Inba Mayam	Tamil	Vande Nee Vaa Vaa	Ghantasala	
1956	Kannin Manigal	Tamil	Edhukkum Rendu Thevai	S. V. Venkatraman	Udutha Sarojini
1956	Moondru Pengal	Tamil	Saalaiyile Rendu Maram	K. V. Mahadevan	
1956	Naane Raja	Tamil	O Amma Josiyam...Elelangadi	T. R. Ramanathan	
1956	Naan Petra Selvam	Tamil	Mandhamaarudham.... Manmadhanai Kandathillai	G. Ramanathan	Thiruchi Loganathan
1956	Rambaiyin Kaadhal	Tamil	Kattivellam Neeye Katterumbu Naane	T. R. Pappa	K. H. Reddy
1956	Rangoon Radha	Tamil	Naatukkoru Veeran	T. R. Pappa	Seerkazhi Govindarajan
1956	Sadhaaram	Tamil	Enggum Oli Veesudhe Ennai Thedi	G. Ramanathan	P. Bhanumathi & A. P. Komala
1956	Sadhaaram	Tamil	Annaiye Kaaliyamma Eeswari	G. Ramanathan	T. M. Soundararajan, V. T. Rajagopalan & A. P. Komala
1956	Thaaikkuppin Thaaram	Tamil	Vittadhadi Aasai.... Eravittu Eni Edukkum	K. V. Mahadevan	S. C. Krishnan
1956	Thaaikkuppin Thaaram	Tamil	Thandhaavaram Thandhaaluvaan Thiruchendhooril	K. V. Mahadevan	S. C. Krishnan
1957	Aaravalli	Tamil	Idhu Sengkamma Adhu Angkamma	G. Ramanathan	Seerkazhi Govindarajan & Thiruchi Loganathan
1957	Aaravalli	Tamil	Kummaalam Pottadhellaam Adangiyadhaa	G. Ramanathan	T. V. Rathnam
1957	Kadan Vaangi Kalyaanam	Tamil	Kaasikku Ponene Raamaahari	S. Rajeswara Rao	S. C. Krishnan
1957	Kadan Vaangi Kalyaanam	Tamil	Akkaa Magale....Thootthukkudi Saatthukkudi	S. Rajeswara Rao	S. C. Krishnan
1957	Karpukkarasi	Tamil	Nal Vaakku Nee Kodadi	G. Ramanathan	S. C. Krishnan
1957	Karpukkarasi	Tamil	Ellai Meerudhe Manam Thulli Odudhe	G. Ramanathan	A. P. Komala & K. Jamuna Rani
1957	Mahadhevi	Tamil	Un Thirumugathey Oru Mugamaa Thiruppu	Viswanathan–Ramamoorthy	J. P. Chandrababu
1957	Mahadhevi	Tamil	Thanthana Taalam Poduvom	Viswanathan–Ramamoorthy	J. P. Chandrababu
1957	Makkalai Petra Magarasi	Tamil	Adi Thaaraapuram Thaamburam	K. V. Mahadevan	S. C. Krishnan
1957	Makkalai Petra Magarasi	Tamil	O Malliyakkaa O Rojaakkaa	K. V. Mahadevan	Jikki & K. Jamuna Rani
1957	Makkalai Petra Magarasi	Tamil	Senthazham Poovai Poi	K. V. Mahadevan	K. Jamuna Rani
1957	Manamagan Thevai	Tamil	Pottaane Oru Podudhaan	G. Ramanathan	K. Jamuna Rani & A. P. Komala
1957	Mudhalali	Tamil	Enga Mudhalali Thanga	K. V. Mahadevan	V. N. Sundaram, S. V. Ponnusamy & G. Kasthoori
1957	Mudhalali	Tamil	Chikkanama Vaazhanum	K. V. Mahadevan	G. Kasthoori
1957	Pudhumai Pithan	Tamil	Aiyya Yaarukku Venum Indha	G. Ramanathan	
1957	Pudhumai Pithan	Tamil	Maamannar Andha	G. Ramanathan	
1957	Rani Lalithangi	Tamil	Aadunga Paadunga Odureenga	G. Ramanathan	P. Leela
1957	Rani Lalithangi	Tamil	Bajanaikku Naazhigai	G. Ramanathan	V. T. Rajagopalan
1957	Thangamalai Ragasiyam	Tamil	Kaattu Raajaa Aiyaa Kaattu Raajaa	T. G. Lingappa	K. Rani
1957	Thangamalai Ragasiyam	Tamil	Varavenum Varavenum	T. G. Lingappa	A. P. Komala & K. Rani
1958	Annaiyin Aanai	Tamil	Enna Saami Edhukku Summa Paarkire	S. M. Subbaiah Naidu	Seergazhi Govindarajan & S. C. Krishnan
1958	Annaiyin Aanai	Tamil	Thandhaana Thaana Thaanaa.... Senthaazham Poo	S. M. Subbaiah Naidu	Jikki
1958	Boologa Rambai	Tamil	Vanna Mayil Vel Murugan	C. N. Pandurangan	K. Rani
1958	Boologa Rambai	Tamil	Om Endra Pranavatthin.... Kalli Malai; Kurinji Nilam	C. N. Pandurangan	Thiruchi Loganathan, Jikki & S. C. Krishnan
1958	Bhooloka Rambha	Telugu	Loyalalo Mayakuni Koyakulam Maadi Koyalamma Maa Guruvu	C. N. Pandurangan	K. Rani
1958	Bhooloka Rambha	Telugu	Dandakaavani Seethayu	C. N. Pandurangan	Madhavapeddi Satyam, Pithapuram Nageswara Rao & K. Rani
1958	Kaathavaraayan	Tamil	Kumkaara Kuppanna	G. Ramanathan	S. C. Krishnan, K. Jamuna Rani, K. Rani & Sundaramma
1958	Kaathavaraayan	Tamil	Vetrriye Arul Amma	G. Ramanathan	A. P. Komala, K. Jamuna Rani, K. Rani & Sundaramma
1958	Kanniyin Sabatham	Tamil	Manmadhanai Sivaperuman	T. G. Lingappa	Seerkazhi Govindarajan
1958	Karthavarayuni Katha	Telugu	Poosey Malli Remma	G. Ramanathan & G. Ashwathama	A. P. Komala, K. Rani & Sundaramma
1958	Karthavarayuni Katha	Telugu	Meesala Rosayyo	G. Ramanathan & G. Ashwathama	Madhavapeddi Satyam
1958	Kudumba Gouravam	Tamil	Verum Vesham	Viswanathan–Ramamoorthy	A. P. Komala
1958	Kudumba Gouravam	Tamil	Kaatthirukkom	Viswanathan–Ramamoorthy	A. P. Komala
1958	Kudumba Gouravam	Tamil	Chinaa Jappaan Rangoon	Viswanathan–Ramamoorthy	A. P. Komala
1958	Mangalya Bhagyam	Tamil	Anusooya Kadhaakaalatchebam	G. Ramanathan	Seerkazhi Govindarajan, M. L. Vasanthakumari, A. P. Komala & K. Jamuna Rani
1958	Mangalya Bhagyam	Tamil	Paadu Pattaale Machaan	G. Ramanathan	A. P. Komala & K. Jamuna Rani
1958	Mangalya Bhagyam	Tamil	Ondre Maandhar Kulam	G. Ramanathan	Seerkazhi Govindarajan & K. Jamuna Rani
1958	Mangalya Bhagyam	Tamil	Imaya Malaiyai Idadhu Kaiyaal	G. Ramanathan	K. Jamuna Rani
1958	Maya Manithan	Tamil	Pokku Kaatti Poravale Ponnaammaa	G. Govindarajulu Naidu	A. L. Raghavan
1958	Neelamalai Thirudan	Tamil	Vetthala Paakku Sunnaambu Patthiri Elam Kiraambu	K. V. Mahadevan	S. C. Krishnan
1958	Neelamalai Thirudan	Tamil	Onnukku Rendaachu Ubatthiravatthukku	K. V. Mahadevan	S. C. Krishnan
1958	Neelavukku Neranja Manasu	Tamil	Singaara Sangeethame	K. V. Mahadevan	Soolamangalam Rajalakshmi & Jikki
1958	Petra Maganai Vitra Annai	Tamil	Dhil Rapsaa Panraango	Viswanathan–Ramamoorthy	S. C. Krishnan
1958	Sampoorna Ramayanam	Tamil	Sree Ramachandiran Magudabishega Thirukkolam Kaanbathatkey	K. V. Mahadevan	A. P. Komala, K. Rani & Udutha Sarojini
1958	Sampoorna Ramayanam	Tamil	Mannellaam Ponnaagum Raaman Varavaaley	K. V. Mahadevan	A. P. Komala, S. C. Krishnan, K. Rani, Udutha Sarojini & M. S. Padma
1958	Sarangadhara	Tamil	Etti Etti Paarkudhadi Thoppile	G. Ramanathan	
1958	Thirudargal Jakkirathai	Tamil	Jakkammaa Devi Sokkammaa	K. V. Mahadevan	
1958	Thirumanam	Tamil	Vai Raajaa Vai	S. M. Subbaiah Naidu & T. G. Lingappa	Seerkazhi Govindarajan
1959	Abalai Anjugam	Tamil	Adichadhu Paar Onnaam Nambar	K. V. Mahadevan	A. L. Raghavan
1959	Arumai Magal Abirami	Tamil	Joraana Kattalagu Ponne	V. Dakshinamoorthy	K. Rani
1959	Arumai Magal Abirami	Tamil	Paaru Paaru Paaru Sirippaaru	V. Dakshinamoorthy	K. Rani
1959	Engal Kuladevi	Tamil	Paalum Pazhamirukka Pakkatthile Naanirukka	K. V. Mahadevan	
1959	Engal Kuladevi	Tamil	Chittang Chittang Kuruvi	K. V. Mahadevan	
1959	Jaya Veeran	Tamil	Thallaathe Bathil Sollaathe	K. V. Mahadevan	A. L. Raghavan
1959	Kalaivaanan	Tamil	Eppo Varuvaaro Solladi	Pendyala Nageswara Rao	
1959	Kalyanikku Kalyanam	Tamil	Nee Anji Nadungathaedoi	G. Ramanathan	A. P. Komala
1959	Kalyanikku Kalyanam	Tamil	Thai Porandhaa Vazhi Porakkum	G. Ramanathan	T. M. Soundararajan, V. R. Rajagopalan, P. Leela, A. P. Komala, K. Jamuna Rani & Kamala
1959	Manaiviye Manithanin Manickam	Tamil	Kaathiruppom Kai Pidippom Kanne	S. Hanumantha Rao	Thiruchi Loganathan
1959	Minnal Veeran	Tamil	Valaiyai Veesum	Vedha	C. Thangkappan
1959	Pandithevan	Tamil	Kal Udaithu Malai Pilandhu	C. N. Pandurangan & Meenakshi Subramanyam	P. B. Sreenivas, T. V. Rathnam, S. V. Ramanan & Gomathi
1959	President Panchatcharam	Tamil	Chinna Ponnu Sirikudhu	G. Ramanathan	A. P. Komala
1959	Sumangali	Tamil	Akkaa Magale Chutti Ponne	M. Ranga Rao	S. C. Krishnan
1959	Thanga Padhumai	Tamil	Poomalai Pottu Pona Maamaa	Viswanathan–Ramamoorthy	S. C. Krishnan
1959	Uzhavukkum Thozhilukkum Vandhanai Seivom	Tamil	Kobikkiraappula Kobichukkaadhe Kannu	K. V. Mahadevan	S. C. Krishnan
1959	Vannakili	Tamil	Saathukkudi Chaaru Thaana Paartthu Kudi	K. V. Mahadevan	S. C. Krishnan
1959	Veerapandiya Kattabomman	Tamil	Aathukkulle Ootthu Vetti	G. Ramanathan	K. Jamuna Rani, V. T. Rajagopalan & Thiruchi Loganathan
1959	Veerapandiya Kattabomman	Tamil	Pogaadhe Pogaadhe En Kanavaa	G. Ramanathan	
1960	Chavukkadi Chandrakantha	Tamil	Aadchiyum Soozhchchiyum Sernthaal	G. Ramanathan	P. Leela
1960	Irumanam Kalanthal Thirumanam	Tamil	Pattu Seylai Vaangi Thaaren	S. Dakshinamurthi	S. C. Krishnan
1960	Kadavulin Kuzhandhai	Tamil	Palign Chadukudu	G. Ramanathan	K. Jamuna Rani
1960	Kuravanji	Tamil	Sengkayal Vandu Kalin Kalin Endru	T. R. Pappa	C. S. Jayaraman, P. Leela & A. P. Komala
1960	Sivagami	Tamil	Kottum Sootrtum Maatikkittu	K. V. Mahadevan	S. C. Krishnan
1960	Thozhan	Tamil	Arasala Pirantha Magarasi	G. Ramanathan	
1961	Jagathalaprathapan	Tamil	Koonthal Mel Poovethamme	Pendyala Nageswara Rao	A. L. Raghavan
1961	Kumara Raja	Tamil	Angadikadai Veedhiyile	T. R. Pappa	Soolamangalam Rajalakshmi
1961	Mamiyarum Oru Veetu Marumagale	Tamil	Vetti Vambu Engalukkul	Pendyala Nageswara Rao	S. C. Krishnan
1961	Marutha Nattu Veeran	Tamil	Seikathoru Santhegam Kelu Kanmani	S. V. Venkatraman	A. L. Raghavan
1961	Thirudadhe	Tamil	Achchaa Baaguthachchaa	S. M. Subbaiah Naidu	S. C. Krishnan
1961	Thirudadhe	Tamil	Andhisaayum Neratthile	S. M. Subbaiah Naidu	A. L. Raghavan
1962	Indira En Selvam	Tamil	Kaadhalukku Kaaleju Enge Irukku	C. N. Pandurangan & H. R. Padmanabha Sastri	S. C. Krishnan
1963	Kalai Arasi	Tamil	Kettaalum Kettadhu Ippadi Kettidak Koodaadhu	K. V. Mahadevan	
1963	Konjum Kumari	Tamil	Thoppule Oru Naal Siritthaayadi	Vedha	Thiruchi Loganathan
1963	Kubera Theevu	Tamil	Kankanda Selvam Inge Paaru	C. N. Pandurangan	
1963	Naan Vanangum Dheivam	Tamil	Veenaana Jaalangal Nee Seivathenadi	K. V. Mahadevan	K. Jamuna Rani & L. R. Eswari
1964	Chithraangi	Tamil	Oyyaari Baamaa Unakkaaga Vaamaa	Vedha	S. V. Ponnusamy
1964	Chithraangi	Tamil	Unakku Onnu Enakku Onnu Irukkudhu Manasu	Vedha	Thiruchi Loganathan
