= Radha Jayalakshmi =

Indian Carnatic Music Duo

Radha (R) and Jayalakshmi (L)
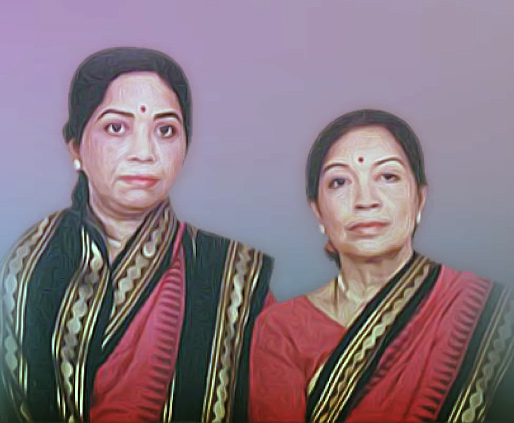
- Radha, Jayalakshmi

Background information
- Born: 1932
- Died: Jayalakshmi - May 27, 2014 (aged 82) Radha - September 28, 2025 (aged 93)
- Genre: Carnatic music
- Occupation: vocalist

Radha (1932 - 28 September 2025) and Jayalakshmi (1932 - 2014), popularly known as Radha Jayalakshmi (Tamil: ராதா ஜெயலட்சுமி), were an Indian Carnatic music vocalist duo as well as playback singers in films in the 1940s and 1950s. They later became teachers and trained notable Carnatic music singers. Jayalakshmi was the playback singer of the duo, but was credited as Radha Jayalakshmi in the cine field. Radha was her cousin and singing partner in live stage performances. They were early vocalists in the duo singing trend in Carnatic music which started in the 1950s and includes performers like Bombay Sisters and Soolamangalam Sisters. In recent times, the trend has been continued by popular Carnatic music singers like Priya Sisters, their disciples, Ranjani Gayatri, Bellur sisters, Mambalam Sisters, Akkarai sisters, and others.

The duo was awarded the 1981 Sangeet Natak Akademi Award in Carnatic Music – Vocal, given by the Sangeet Natak Akademi, India's National Academy for Music, Dance and Drama Vidushi Jayalakshmi died in Chennai on 27 May 2014.

== Early life and training ==
Radha and Jayalakshmi's singing style belongs to the G. N. Balasubramaniam school, and they received their training in classical vocal music from the noted vocalist and teacher himself.

== Career ==
Jayalakshmi has sung in Tamil, Malayalam, Telugu and Kannada movies from the late 1940s to the early 60s.

She also has a few playback singing credits from the 1970s.

In Deivam, Kunnakkudi Vaidyanathan had both Radha and Jayalakshmi render Thiruchendooril Por Purindhu, a devotional song set in Thiruthani. This is perhaps the only film song sung by Radha of the duo. But both have given stage performances throughout India.

The singers had no longer been giving performances towards the time of Jayalakshmi's death, but instead had shifted their efforts to teaching Carnatic music and were regarded as great teachers. Shanmukhapriya and Haripriya, popularly known as the Priya Sisters, were their students.

=== Music composers Jayalakshmi sang for ===
Jayalakshmi's most memorable songs date from the 50s films.

- S. Balachander
- S. M. Subbaiah Naidu
- G. Aswathama
- M. S. Gnanamani
- Shankar–Jaikishan
- Parur S. Anantharaman
- M. D. Parthasarathy
- Viswanathan–Ramamoorthy
- V. Nagayya
- G. Ramanathan
- Adepalli Rama Rao
- G. Govindarajulu Naidu
- P. Adinarayana Rao
- C. N. Pandurangan
- T. G. Lingappa
- K. V. Mahadevan
- S. V. Venkatraman
- M. S. Viswanathan
- M. K. Athmanathan
- Vedha
- R. Sudarsanam
- M. Ranga Rao
- V. Krishnamoorthy
- Meenakshi Subramanyam
- Pendyala Nageswara Rao
- G. K. Venkatesh
- S. Hanumantha Rao
- H. R. Pathmanaba Sastiri
- K. V. Job
- G. Devarajan
- Shankar–Ganesh
- Kunnakudi Vaidyanathan

=== Playback singers Jayalakshmi sang with ===
Jayalakshmi was often paired to sing with the male singers T. M. Soundararajan, Seerkazhi Govindarajan and A. M. Rajah. Other male singers she sang with include T. A. Mothi, Ghantasala, S. Balachander, Thiruchi Loganathan, K. Prasad Rao, V. N. Sundaram, Subrahmanyam and Pithapuram Nageswara Rao.

She also sang duets with female singers, most notably with P. Leela and Soolamangalam Rajalakshmi. Others are M. L. Vasanthakumari, P. A. Periyanayaki, N. L. Ganasaraswathi, A. P. Komala, T. V. Rathnam, M. S. Rajeswari, S. Janaki, K. Rani and Jikki.

The singing actors she sang with were K. R. Ramasamy and S. Varalakshmi.

== Death ==
Jayalakshmi of the duo, died, aged 82, in Chennai on 26 May 2014. Radha died, aged 93, on 28 September 2025.

== Filmography ==
List of film songs recorded by Radha Jayalakshmi:

Year	Film	Language	Song	Music	Co-singer
1948	Idhu Nijama	Tamil	"Madarellam"	S. Balachander	S. Balachander
1950	Beedala Patlu	Telugu	Vidhivasamaithi Anaadhanaithi	S. M. Subbaiah Naidu & G. Aswathama	
1950	Beedala Patlu	Telugu	Vilaasame Naakika Vikaasame Lalala	S. M. Subbaiah Naidu & G. Aswathama	
1950	Ezhai Padum Padu	Tamil	Vidhiyin Vilaivaal	S. M. Subbaiah Naidu	
1950	Ezhai Padum Padu	Tamil	En Bhaagyame Inimel Saubhagyame	S. M. Subbaiah Naidu	
1950	Prasanna	Malayalam	Sukritharaaga	M. S. Gnanamani	K. Prasad Rao
1950	Prasanna	Malayalam	Kaayikasoubhaagyam	M. S. Gnanamani	
1950	Prasanna	Malayalam	Dhavalaroopa	M. S. Gnanamani	
1950	Prasanna	Malayalam	Bhaarathamaatha Paripoorna	M. S. Gnanamani	
1950	Prasanna	Malayalam	Aagathamaay Madhukaalam	M. S. Gnanamani	
1951	Kaidhi	Tamil	Be Happy Be Cheerful Be Jolly	S. Balachander	
1952	Desabhakthan	Malayalam	Oh Athimodamaarnna	Shankar–Jaikishan	
1952	Kanchana	Tamil	Pazhaniappa Nin Paadham	S. M. Subbaiah Naidu	
1952	Kanchana	Tamil	Etham Pottu	S. M. Subbaiah Naidu	
1952	Kanchana	Telugu	Paramapaavanī Dhayaganave	S. M. Subbaiah Naidu	
1952	Kanjana	Malayalam	Charana Pankajam	S. M. Subbaiah Naidu	
1952	Kanjana	Malayalam	Vela Cheyyu	S. M. Subbaiah Naidu	
1952	Moondru Pillaigal	Tamil	Malai Thiritha Magarasi	Parur S. Anantharaman & M. D. Parthasarathy	P. Leela
1952	Panam	Tamil	En Vazhvil Puthu Paadama	Viswanathan–Ramamoorthy	
1952	Puratchi Veeran	Tamil	Oh Alai Modhum	Shankar–Jaikishan	
1952	Thai Ullam	Tamil	Poochendu Nee Ponvandu Naan	V. Nagayya	T. A. Mothi & N. L. Ganasaraswathi
1952	Thai Ullam	Tamil	Pokkiri Payale	V. Nagayya	
1952	Zamindar	Tamil	Madhuvai Parugum Vandu	G. Ramanathan	
1953	En Veedu	Tamil	Pongalo Pongal	V. Nagayya	Ghantasala
1953	En Veedu	Tamil	Nilaiyilla Vazhvu Idhuthana	V. Nagayya	
1953	En Veedu	Tamil	Konjum Mozhi Maindargale	V. Nagayya	M. L. Vasanthakumari
1953	Inspector	Tamil	Aasaiyai Maunamaayi Pesidum	G. Ramanathan	
1953	Inspector	Tamil	Unnaiyallaal Thunai Yaaramma	G. Ramanathan	
1953	Manam Pola Mangalyam	Tamil	Manam Pola	Adepalli Rama Rao	
1953	Manam Pola Mangalyam	Tamil	Andru Ododi Vandhu	Adepalli Rama Rao	
1953	Manidhanum Mirugamum	Tamil	Jagam Yaavum	G. Govindarajulu Naidu	
1953	Naa Illu	Telugu	Gobbillo Gobbillo	V. Nagayya	Ghantasala
1953	Naa Illu	Telugu		V. Nagayya	M. L. Vasanthakumari
1953	Ponni	Tamil	Azhagum Gunamum Ulla Pennukku	S. M. Subbaiah Naidu	
1953	Ponni	Tamil	Paambodu Pazhagalaam Pennmani	S. M. Subbaiah Naidu	
1953	Ponni	Tamil	Aadi Paadu Paappaa	S. M. Subbaiah Naidu	
1953	Ponni	Tamil	Aaduvome Oonjal Aaduvome	S. M. Subbaiah Naidu	P. A. Periyanayaki, Radha & A. P. Komala
1953	Poongodhai	Tamil	Thenoorum Paarijaatha	P. Adinarayana Rao	
1954	Aggi Ramudu	Telugu	Jai Andhra Janani	S. M. Subbaiah Naidu	A. M. Rajah
1954	Aggi Ramudu	Telugu	Raraa Yashodanandana	S. M. Subbaiah Naidu	
1954	Edhir Paradhathu	Tamil	Jegam Ezhum Neeye	C. N. Pandurangan	
1954	En Magal	Tamil	Kannai Kaanaamal Kalangudhe	C. N. Pandurangan	
1954	Kalyanam Panniyum Brammachari	Tamil	Madhumalar Ellam	T. G. Lingappa	
1954	Kalyanam Panniyum Brammachari	Tamil	Vennilavum Vanum Pol	T. G. Lingappa	
1954	Koondukkili	Tamil	Paar En Magale Paar Paar	K. V. Mahadevan	
1954	Koondukkili	Tamil	Vaanga Ellorume Serndhu Ondraagave	K. V. Mahadevan	T. M. Soundararajan, V. N. Sundaram & K. Rani
1954	Mangalyam	Tamil	Ninaithaaley Inbam Tharum	K. V. Mahadevan	
1954	Mangalyam	Tamil	Ottumiru Ullanthanai Vettuvathu	K. V. Mahadevan	
1954	Manohara	Tamil	Kadhal Kondaadugiraar	S. V. Venkatraman	
1954	Manohara	Tamil	Singara Paingkiliye Pesu	S. V. Venkatraman	A. M. Rajah
1954	Manohara	Tamil	Vazhvatho Mathu	S. V. Venkatraman	
1954	Manohara	Telugu	Vechiti Innallu	S. V. Venkatraman	
1954	Manohara	Telugu	Pranaya Vilasamule	S. V. Venkatraman	
1954	Manohara	Telugu	Manahinanai Avamanamothuna	S. V. Venkatraman	
1954	Manohara	Telugu	Vana Mahotsavam Vasantha	S. V. Venkatraman	Jikki, Subrahmanyam & Pithapuram Nageswara Rao
1954	Pona Machaan Thirumbi Vandhan	Tamil	Aadhaaram Nin Paadham Ambigaiye	C. N. Pandurangan & M. S. Viswanathan	
1954	Ratha Pasam	Tamil	Jagam Yaavumey	M. K. Athmanathan	
1955	Kathanayaki	Tamil	Maalai Onru Kaiyil	G. Ramanathan	K. Jamuna Rani
1955	Menaka	Tamil	Manampola Ini Vaazhalaam	C. N. Pandurangan & Vedha	K. R. Ramasamy
1955	Menaka	Tamil	Kanavu Ninaivaagum	C. N. Pandurangan & Vedha	
1955	Mullaivanam	Tamil	Engirundho Ingu Vandha Radhiye	K. V. Mahadevan	T. M. Soundararajan
1955	Mullaivanam	Tamil	Sariyendru Neeye Oru Vaarthai Sonnal	K. V. Mahadevan	T. M. Soundararajan
1955	Mullaivanam	Tamil	Puttham Pudhu Malare Kurunagai Puriyum Vennilavey	K. V. Mahadevan	
1955	Mullaivanam	Tamil	Nainaithaale Inikkudhadi	K. V. Mahadevan	
1955	Nalla Thangai	Tamil	Thaene Paage Thevittadha	G. Ramanathan	
1955	Town Bus	Tamil	Ponnaana Vaazhve Mannagi Poma	K. V. Mahadevan	M. S. Rajeswari & Thiruchi Loganathan
1955	Town Bus	Tamil	Nenjam Urugudhey Sadhaa	K. V. Mahadevan	
1955	Valliyin Selvan	Tamil	Mangalam Embaro	Parur S. Anantharaman	
1955	Vedan Kannappa	Tamil	Thaarum Thaarum Navamoganaa	R. Sudarsanam	
1956	Gomathiyin Kaadhalan	Tamil	Sirpa Kalai Vizhaavin	G. Ramanathan	T. V. Rathnam & P. Leela
1956	Verum Pechu Alla	Tamil		C. N. Pandurangan	
1957	Pudhu Vazhvu	Tamil	Kottu Melam Kovilile	G. Ramanathan & C. N. Pandurangan	
1957	Samaya Sanjeevi	Tamil	Aanantham Tharuvathu Sangeethemey	G. Ramanathan	N. L. Ganasaraswathi
1957	Town Bus	Telugu	Letha Valapura Sadhaa	M. Ranga Rao	
1958	Anbu Engey	Tamil	Kaya Pazhama Sollu Raja	Vedha	
1958	Boologa Rambai	Tamil	Kannalar Ingu Varuvaar	C. N. Pandurangan	
1958	Boologa Rambai	Tamil	Amba Arul Purivaai	C. N. Pandurangan	
1958	Boologa Rambai	Tamil	Gangatharane	C. N. Pandurangan	
1958	Boologa Rambai	Tamil	Aasai Nenjame	C. N. Pandurangan	A. M. Rajah
1958	Bhooloka Rambha	Telugu	O Manohara	C. N. Pandurangan	A. M. Rajah
1958	Manamalai	Tamil	Nadanamaadinaar	Vedha	P. Leela
1958	Sarangadhara	Tamil	Ethukkithanai Modi	G. Ramanathan	
1959	Mala Oru Mangala Vilakku	Tamil	Unnai Panindhen	C. N. Pandurangan	
1959	Mala Oru Mangala Vilakku	Tamil	Annai Nee En Vaazhvile	C. N. Pandurangan	
1959	Manimekalai	Tamil	Manathai Kavarntha	G. Ramanathan	Seerkazhi Govindarajan
1959	Manimekalai	Tamil	Varuga Varuga Sugumaaraa	G. Ramanathan	P. Leela & A. P. Komala
1959	Maragadham	Tamil	Maalai Mayangugira Neram	S. M. Subbaiah Naidu	
1959	Maragadham	Tamil	Punnagai Thavazhum	S. M. Subbaiah Naidu	T. M. Soundararajan
1959	Maragadham	Tamil	Kanukkulle Unnai Paaru	S. M. Subbaiah Naidu	T. M. Soundararajan
1959	Maragadham	Tamil	Aadinaal Nadanam Aadinaal	S. M. Subbaiah Naidu	
1959	Minnal Veeran	Tamil	Kannodu Kanninai Nokki	S. M. Subbaiah Naidu	Seerkazhi Govindarajan
1959	Odi Vilaiyaadu Paapa	Tamil	Pachai Kuzhandayadi Kannil Paavaiyandro Chandramathi	V. Krishnamoorthy	Seerkazhi Govindarajan
1959	Pandithevan	Tamil	Kannum Karuthum	C. N. Pandurangan & Meenakshi Subramanyam	K. Rani & S. Janaki
1959	President Panchatcharam	Tamil	Oli Padaitha Kanninaayi VaaVaa	G. Ramanathan	M. L. Vasanthakumari
1959	Sivagangai Seemai	Tamil	Muthu Pugazh	Viswanathan–Ramamoorthy	S. Varalakshmi
1960	Bhaktha Sabari	Tamil	Vaaraai Inre Mohana	Pendyala Nageswara Rao	
1960	Bhaktha Sabari	Tamil	Vaaraai Mana Mohana	Pendyala Nageswara Rao	
1960	Bhaktha Sabari	Telugu	Rama Manamohana	Pendyala Nageswara Rao	
1960	Dashavathara	Kannada	Sringaara Mohini	G. K. Venkatesh	
1960	Irumbu Thirai	Tamil	Enna Seithaalum	S. V. Venkatraman	
1960	Mahakavi Kalidasu	Telugu	Rasika Raajamani	Pendyala Nageswara Rao	P. Leela
1960	Ponni Thirunaal	Tamil	Nattukkor Thanthaiyadi	K. V. Mahadevan	Soolamangalam Rajalakshmi
1960	Raja Bakthi	Tamil	Kaliyuga Malarmaran Thaano	G. Govindarajulu Naidu	P. Leela
1960	Raja Bakthi	Tamil	Vannam Paadum	G. Govindarajulu Naidu	
1960	Ranadheera Kanteerava	Kannada	Karunada Vairamudi Kanteerava	G. K. Venkatesh	Soolamangalam Rajalakshmi
1960	Ranadheera Kanteerava	Kannada	Enna MogavaBhoodaana	G. K. Venkatesh	
1960	Sanchari	Telugu	Karnata Rajya Manikanteerava	G. K. Venkatesh	Soolamangalam Rajalakshmi
1960	Sanchari	Telugu	Andhamulaku Neevu Ranive	G. K. Venkatesh	
1960	Solaimalai Raani	Tamil	Anaiya Jothi	C. N. Pandurangan	A. M. Rajah
1960	Solaimalai Raani	Tamil	Anbaana Mozhi Pesum	C. N. Pandurangan	A. M. Rajah
1960	Vimala	Telugu	Neeli Vennela Kaya Sage	S. M. Subbaiah Naidu	
1960	Vimala	Telugu	Kannullo Nee Bomma Choodu	S. M. Subbaiah Naidu	Ghantasala
1960	Vimala	Telugu	Kaavaave Amma Devi	S. M. Subbaiah Naidu	
1960	Vimala	Telugu	Kannula Beluke	S. M. Subbaiah Naidu	Ghantasala
1961	Bhagyalakshmi	Tamil	Varalakshmi Varuvaai Amma	Viswanathan–Ramamoorthy	
1961	Bhagyalakshmi	Tamil	Palingu Manappandhalile	Viswanathan–Ramamoorthy	
1961	Akbar	Tamil	Azhagin Nila	S. V. Venkatraman	
1961	Sabarimala Ayyappan	Malayalam	Ashrithayaamen	S. M. Subbaiah Naidu	
1961	Sabarimala Ayyappan	Tamil	Aaadharitthen En Allalai	S. M. Subbaiah Naidu	
1962	Avana Ivan	Tamil	Vaaranamayiram	S. Balachander	
1962	Bhoodaana	Kannada	Bhagyada Lakshmi	G. K. Venkatesh	
1962	Dakshayagnam	Telugu	Navarasa Bhaavaalaa	S. Hanumantha Rao	P. Leela
1962	Indira En Selvam	Tamil	Aaraaro Aaraaro	H. R. Pathmanaba Sastiri & C. N. Pandurangan	
1962	Indira En Selvam	Tamil	Thellathelindha Thenamudhe	H. R. Pathmanaba Sastiri & C. N. Pandurangan	
1962	Konjum Salangai	Tamil	Brahman Thaalam Poda	S. M. Subbaiah Naidu	Soolamangalam Rajalakshmi
1962	Muripinche Muvvalu	Telugu	Brahme Thalam Mrocha	S. M. Subbaiah Naidu	P. Leela
1963	Arivaali	Tamil	Vaazhiya Needoozhi	S. V. Venkatraman	P. Leela
1964	Oraal Koodi Kallanaayi	Malayalam	Veeshuka Nee Kodumkatte	K. V. Job	
1966	Motor Sundaram Pillai	Tamil	Maname Muruganin Mayilvahanam	M. S. Viswanathan	
1969	Kaaval Dheivam	Tamil	Maiyal Migavum Meerudhe	G. Devarajan	
1969	Kumara Sambhavam	Malayalam	Maayaanadanavihaarini	G. Devarajan	P. Leela
1969	Kumara Sambhavam	Tamil		G. Devarajan	P. Leela
1971	Aathi Parasakthi	Tamil	Kokku Parakkum Indha	K. V. Mahadevan	
1971	Aathi Parasakthi	Tamil	Thandhaikku Mandhiratthai	K. V. Mahadevan	
1973	Amman Arul	Tamil	Akilamellam Vilangum	Shankar–Ganesh	
1973	Dheivam	Tamil	Thiruchendooril Por Purindhu	Kunnakudi Vaidyanathan	Radha
1973	Nathayil Muthu	Tamil	Karpanai Vaadhigalin (Aaadu Raatte)	Shankar–Ganesh	Seerkazhi Govindarajan
1973	Nathayil Muthu	Tamil	Ragupathi Raagava Raajaaraam	Shankar–Ganesh	Seerkazhi Govindarajan
1973	Nathayil Muthu	Tamil	Eeswara Allah.... Ragupathi Raagava Raajaaraam	Shankar–Ganesh	
