= Soolamangalam Sisters =

Indian Carnatic musical duo

Soolamangalam Jayalakshmi
- Born: Jayalakshmi; 24 April 1937
- Origin: Soolamangalam, Thanjavur district, Madras presidency, British India
- Died: 29 June 2017 (aged 80) Chennai, Tamil Nadu, India
- Genres: devotional, patriotic, film music
- Occupations: Singer-songwriter, musician

Soolamangalam Rajalakshmi
- Born: Rajalakshmi; 6 November 1940
- Origin: Soolamangalam, Thanjavur district, Madras presidency, British India
- Died: 1 March 1992 (aged 51) Chennai, Tamil Nadu, India.
- Genres: Devotional, Patriotic, film music
- Occupations: Singer-songwriter, musician

Soolamangalam Jayalakshmi and Soolamangalam Rajalakshmi, popularly known as the Soolamangalam Sisters were Carnatic music sister-pair vocalists and musicians known for their devotional songs in Tamil. They were early singers in the trend of duo singing in Carnatic music, which started in the 1950s, with performers like Radha Jayalakshmi, and later continued by the Bombay Sisters, Ranjani-Gayatri, Mambalam Sisters, Bangalore Sisters, Bellur sisters and Priya Sisters. The Soolamangalam Sisters are best known for singing the Kanda Shasti Kavasam, a hymn on the Hindu god Muruga.

== Early life and background ==
Born in Soolamangalam, a village with musical heritage in Thanjavur district of Tamil Nadu, of Karnam Ramaswami Ayyar and Janaki Ammal, the sisters had their training in music from K. G. Murthi of Soolamangalam, Pathamadai S. Krishnan, and Mayavaram Venugopalayyar.

The duo-sisters were very popular for their matchless rendition of national and devotional songs. They had a hectic practice for about three decades and were much sought after for providing background music in films. Their Kanda Shasti Kavasam album is very popular with the Lord Muruga devotees.

== Notable songs ==
Song	Albums
Kanda shasti kavasam	Kanda shasti kavasam album
Skanda Guru kavasam	Kanda shasti kavasam album

== Awards ==
- Muruga Ganamrtha
- Kuyil Isai Thilakam
- Isaiarasi
- Nadhakanal
- Kalaimamani in 1992 by Tamil Nadu Eyal Isai Nataka Mandram.

== Filmography ==
=== Film music ===
Many of Rajalakshmi's songs are under K. V. Mahadevan's music direction all the while. Many of her songs were under T. G. Lingappa mainly in Kannada. She also sang under her own music compositions. She sang more often in the 1950s while during the 1960s.

=== Music director ===
Rajalakshmi assisted S. M. Subbaiah Naidu in Konjum Salangai. Both Jayalakshmi and Rajalakshmi ae as music directors by the name Soolamangalam Sisters. They also sang under their own compositions.

Year	Film	Language	Director	Banner	Notes
1970	Dharisanam	Tamil	V. T. Arasu	Sendhoor Films	
1974	Tiger Thaathachari	Tamil	V. T. Arasu	Sendhoor Films	
1979	Appothe Sonnene Kettiya	Tamil	V. T. Arasu	Shashti Films	
1984	Pillaiyar	Tamil	V. T. Arasu	Shashti Films	

=== Soolamangalam Jayalakshmi ===
Year	Film	Language	Song	Music	Co-singer
1948	Adhithan Kanavu	Tamil	Madhuramaana Rusi Ullathe	G. Ramanathan	T. R. Mahalingam
1952	Maappillai	Tamil	Sirandha Ulaginile	T. R. Pappa & N. S. Balakrishnan	P. Leela
1952	Maappillai	Tamil	Maaya Ulagil Mayakkamaa	T. R. Pappa & N. S. Balakrishnan	P. Leela
1952	Maappillai	Tamil	Sadhiyum Vidhiyai Vendradhaale	T. R. Pappa & N. S. Balakrishnan	
1955	Kalyanam Seydhukko	Tamil	Vaetti Kattina Pombale	Ramaneekaran	Seerkazhi Govindarajan
1961	Arasilangkumari	Tamil	Oorvalamaaga Maappillai Pennum	G. Ramanathan	T. M. Soundararajan & P. Susheela
1961	Naaga Nandhini	Tamil	Valluvan Vedham	R. Sudarsanam	Soolamangalam Rajalakshmi
1961	Naaga Nandhini	Tamil	Singame Singame	R. Sudarsanam	Soolamangalam Rajalakshmi
1962	Indira En Selvam	Tamil	Thitthikkum Thamizhile	H. R. Padmanabha Sasthri & C. N. Pandurangan	Soolamangalam Rajalakshmi
1962	Saradha	Tamil	Manamagale Marumagale Vaa Vaa	K. V. Mahadevan	Soolamangalam Rajalakshmi & L. R. Eswari
1964	Bhakta Ramadasu	Telugu	Mohanaakaara Raamaa	V. Nagayya	Soolamangalam Rajalakshmi
1964	Bhakta Ramadasu	Telugu	Raamaa Paahimaam	V. Nagayya	Soolamangalam Rajalakshmi
1964	Bhakta Ramadasu	Telugu	Pahimam Sriramante	V. Nagayya	Soolamangalam Rajalakshmi
1974	Tiger Thathachari	Tamil	Ezhumalai Vaasaa Vengkadesaa	Soolamagalam Sisters	Soolamangalam Rajalakshmi & K. Veeramani
1979	Kandhar Alangaram	Tamil	Kandhanukku Alangaaram Kandhar Alangaaram	Kunnakkudi Vaidyanathan	Soolamangalam Rajalakshmi
1984	Pillaiyar	Tamil	Pillaiyar Pillaiyar	Soolamangalam Sisters	Soolamangalam Rajalakshmi

=== Soolamangalam Rajalakshmi ===
Year	Film	Language	Song	Music	Co-singer
1948	Krishna Bakthi	Tamil	Kanavil Kandene Kannan Mel Kaadhal Kondene	S. V. Venkatraman, G. Ramanathan & Kunnakudi Venkatarama Iyer	
1952	Aan	Tamil	Naan Raaniye Rajavin	Naushad	
1952	Aan	Tamil	Aa Sududhe En Maname	Naushad	
1952	Amarakavi	Tamil	Annai Thandhai Anbariyaadha	G. Ramanathan & T. A. Kalyanam	M. K. Thyagaraja Bhagavathar
1952	Therupadagan	Tamil	Kutraalathula Neerveezhchi Vandhaalum	G. Ramanathan	
1952	Velaikaran	Tamil	Maane Marikozhundhe	R. Sudarsanam	T. S. Bagavathi, A. G. Rathnamala & M. S. Rajeswari
1954	Kalyanam Panniyum Brammachari	Tamil	Azhage Anandham	T. G. Lingappa	
1954	Kalyanam Panniyum Brammachari	Tamil	Azhage Penn Vadivamaana	T. G. Lingappa	V. N. Sundaram
1954	Kanavu	Tamil	Thandhaka Thaganaka	G. Ramanathan & V. Dakshinamoorthy	
1954	Raja Guruvu	Telugu	Prema Vina Varamemi	K. N. Dandayudhapani Pillai	Ghantasala
1954	Raja Guruvu	Telugu	Aa Daivamu Karunanidhi	K. N. Dandayudhapani Pillai	
1954	Thuli Visham	Tamil	Sammadhitthaal Endrum Sandhoshame	K. N. Dandayudhapani Pillai	K. R. Ramasamy
1954	Viduthalai	Tamil	Inidhaana Thendral	Letchumanan Kurunath	
1954	Vilayattu Bommai	Tamil	Kalai Chelvame Vaazhgave	T. G. Lingappa	
1954	Vilayattu Bommai	Tamil	Kannil Prasannamaana Kaliye	T. G. Lingappa	
1954	Vilayattu Bommai	Tamil	Inba Vaanil Ulaavum	T. G. Lingappa	T. R. Mahalingam
1954	Vilayattu Bommai	Tamil	Periyorgal Sollai Pola	T. G. Lingappa	
1955	Menaka	Tamil	Sugamaana Isaiyaagum Vaazhve	C. N. Pandurangan & Vedha	
1956	Aathmaarpanam	Malayalam	Ullathu Chollu Penne	V. Dakshinamurthy	T. S. Kumaresh
1956	Aniyathi	Malayalam	Paahisakala Janani	Br Lakshmanan	P. Leela
1956	Bhaktha Markandeya	Kannada	Jaya Jaya Sankara	Viswanathan–Ramamoorthy	V. Nagayya
1956	Bhaktha Markandeya	Kannada	Markandeya Jananambandina	Viswanathan–Ramamoorthy	
1956	Bhaktha Markandeya	Kannada	Shankara Gaḷahaaraa	Viswanathan–Ramamoorthy	V. Nagayya
1956	Bhaktha Markandeya	Kannada	Sakala Sarachara	Viswanathan–Ramamoorthy	
1956	Bhaktha Markandeya	Telugu	Jaya Jaya Sankara	Viswanathan–Ramamoorthy	V. Nagayya
1956	Bhaktha Markandeya	Telugu	Markandeya Jananambandina	Viswanathan–Ramamoorthy	
1956	Bhaktha Markandeya	Telugu	Shankara Gaḷahaaraa	Viswanathan–Ramamoorthy	V. Nagayya
1956	Bhaktha Markandeya	Telugu	Sakala Sarachara	Viswanathan–Ramamoorthy	
1957	Baagyavathi	Tamil	Paruvam Kondu Asaindhu Aadum	S. Dakshinamurthy	
1957	Bhaktha Markandeya	Tamil	Anbin Uruve Neeye	Viswanathan–Ramamoorthy	P. B. Sreenivas
1957	Bhaktha Markandeya	Tamil	Andasaraasarangal	Viswanathan–Ramamoorthy	
1957	Magathala Nattu Mary	Tamil	Jaya Jaya Jayame Peruvadhu Nijame	R. Parthasarathy	K. Rani
1957	Pathiye Dheivam	Tamil	Prabho....Padhi Sevaiye Enakku	M. Ranga Rao	
1957	Pathiye Dheivam	Tamil	Dhevi Gadhi Nee Vaa	M. Ranga Rao	
1957	Raja Rajan	Tamil	Aadum Azhage Azhagu	K. V. Mahadevan	P. Leela
1957	Rathnagiri Rahasya	Kannada	Sharanara Kaayo	T. G. Lingappa	
1957	Rathnagiri Rahasya	Kannada	Ananda Mahadaananda	T. G. Lingappa	Jikki & K. Rani
1957	Rathnagiri Rahasya	Kannada	Kivi Eradu Sakenayya	T. G. Lingappa	
1957	Rathnagiri Rahasyam	Telugu	Veeradhiveera Shooradhishoora	T. G. Lingappa & M. Subramanya Raju	
1957	Rathnagiri Rahasyam	Telugu	Anandham Manakanandham	T. G. Lingappa & M. Subramanya Raju	Jikki & K. Rani
1957	Rathnagiri Rahasyam	Telugu	Vevela Jejelu	T. G. Lingappa & M. Subramanya Raju	
1957	Thangamalai Ragasiyam	Tamil	Arul Puriyavo Jegannatha	T. G. Lingappa	
1957	Thangamalai Ragasiyam	Tamil	Aanandham Pudhu Aanandham	T. G. Lingappa	Jikki & K. Rani
1957	Thangamalai Ragasiyam	Tamil	Iru Kaadhum Poddhaadhaiyaa	T. G. Lingappa	
1957	Thaskaraveeran	Malayalam	Malarthorum Mandahaasam	S. M. Subbaiah Naidu	P. B. Sreenivas
1957	Thaskaraveeran	Malayalam	Vannallo Vasanthakaalam	S. M. Subbaiah Naidu	
1957	Thaskaraveeran	Malayalam	Aanandakaniye Vaaninmaniye	S. M. Subbaiah Naidu	
1957	Thaskaraveeran	Malayalam	Maayaamoham Maaraathe Nee	S. M. Subbaiah Naidu	
1957	Veguchukka	Telugu	Ninnenchunoyi	Vedha & M. Ranga Rao	
1958	Engal Kudumbam Perisu	Tamil	Ennaalum Kaanaatha Aananthame	T. G. Lingappa	
1958	Engal Kudumbam Perisu	Tamil	Naanum Neeyum Jodi	T. G. Lingappa	S. C. Krishnan
1958	School Master	Kannada	Innenu Aananda	T. G. Lingappa	
1958	School Master	Kannada	Naanu Neenu Jodi	T. G. Lingappa	Pithapuram Nageswara Rao
1958	School Master	Kannada	Bhaameya Nodalu	T. G. Lingappa	
1958	Badi Pantulu	Telugu	Jaagela Ananda Mandeeyaraa	T. G. Lingappa	
1958	Badi Pantulu	Telugu	Neevu Nenu Jodu Ee Eddula Sakketa Choodu	T. G. Lingappa	Pithapuram Nageswara Rao
1958	Badi Pantulu	Telugu	Bhaamanu Jerava Gopaalaa	T. G. Lingappa	
1958	Nalla Idathu Sambandham	Tamil	Jaalam Seivadhu Niyayama	K. V. Mahadevan	M. R. Radha (dialogues)
1958	Nalla Idathu Sambandham	Tamil	Sonnaalum Ketpadhillai	K. V. Mahadevan	
1958	Neelavukku Niranja Manasu	Tamil	Otrumaiye Namakku Uyirnaadi	K. V. Mahadevan	Jikki
1958	Neelavukku Niranja Manasu	Tamil	Kannaikkavarum Baradhakalai	K. V. Mahadevan	
1958	Neelavukku Niranja Manasu	Tamil	Singaara Sangeethame	K. V. Mahadevan	Jikki & A. G. Rathnamala
1958	Sabaash Meena	Tamil	Chitthiram Pesudhadi	T. G. Lingappa	
1958	Sabaash Meena	Tamil	Nalla Vaazhvu Kaanalaame	T. G. Lingappa	
1958	Sabaash Meena	Tamil	Inbatthin Vegamaa Idhayatthin Dhaagamaa	T. G. Lingappa	
1959	Deivame Thunai	Tamil	Vadamadurai Mannan	S. M. Subbaiah Naidu	S. Janaki, Kamala & Kumar
1959	Kanniyin Sabatham	Tamil	Aattatthil Sirandhadhu Pitthalaattam	T. G. Lingappa	M. L. Vasanthakumari
1959	Mala Oru Mangala Vilakku	Tamil	Naan Aada Nee Paadu Kanna	C. N. Pandurangan	
1959	Mala Oru Mangala Vilakku	Tamil	Penn Manam Pole	C. N. Pandurangan	P. B. Sreenivas
1959	Naalu Veli Nilam	Tamil	Unakkum Enakkum Isaindha Porutham	K. V. Mahadevan	
1959	Naalu Veli Nilam	Tamil	Kaani Nilam Vendum	M. K. Athmanathan	
1959	President Panchatcharam	Tamil	Desa Sudhanthiram Thedi Vazhangiya	G. Ramanathan	P. Leela
1959	Thanga Padhumai	Tamil	Varugiraal Ummaithedi	Viswanathan–Ramamoorthy	M. L. Vasanthakumari
1959	Thayapola Pillai Noolapola Selai	Tamil	Sandhegam Theeradha Viyadhi	K. V. Mahadevan	
1959	Thayapola Pillai Noolapola Selai	Tamil	Vilai Mathippillaadha Arumporul Kalaiye	K. V. Mahadevan	P. Susheela
1959	Thayapola Pillai Noolapola Selai	Tamil	Paatti Sollum Kadhai	K. V. Mahadevan	Seerkazhi Govindarajan, Thiruchi Loganathan & L. R. Eswari
1960	Chavukkadi Chandrakantha	Tamil	Mannaa Mayangaadhe Nee	G. Ramanathan	K. Rani
1960	Deivapiravi	Tamil	Vayasu Pennai Marandhidalaamaa	R. Sudarsanam	T. M. Soundararajan
1960	Kanaka Durga Pooja Mahima	Telugu	Jeeviname Paavanam	Rajan–Nagendra	Ghantasala
1960	Maharajan Pettra Mainthan	Tamil	Inba Tamil Paamanam	Rajan–Nagendra	Ghantasala
1960	Paavai Vilakku	Tamil	Nee Sititthal Nan Sirippen	K. V. Mahadevan	
1960	Paavai Vilakku	Tamil	Vetkamaaga Irukkudhu Enakku	K. V. Mahadevan	
1960	Padikkadha Medhai	Tamil	Ore Oru Oorile	K. V. Mahadevan	T. M. Soundararajan
1960	Petra Manam	Tamil	Paadi Paadi Paadi	S. Rajeswara Rao	J. P. Chandrababu
1960	Petra Manam	Tamil	Ore Oru Paisa Tharuvadhu Perisa	S. Rajeswara Rao	
1960	Ponni Thirunaal	Tamil	Ponggi Varum Kaviriye	K. V. Mahadevan	Seerkazhi Govindarajan, Thiruchi Loganathan & L. R. Eswari
1960	Ponni Thirunaal	Tamil	Matthalam Kotta Vari Sangam	K. V. Mahadevan	
1960	Ponni Thirunaal	Tamil	Naattukkor Thandhaiyadi	K. V. Mahadevan	Radha Jayalakshmi
1960	Ranadheera Kanteerava	Kannada	Karunada Vairamudi Kanteerava	G. K. Venkatesh	Radha Jayalakshmi
1960	Ranadheera Kanteerava	Kannada	Kabbina Billanu	G. K. Venkatesh	
1960	Sanchari	Telugu	Karnata Rajya Manikanteerava	G. K. Venkatesh	Radha Jayalakshmi
1960	Sivagami	Tamil	Anggum Inggum Aattam Poda	K. V. Mahadevan	T. M. Soundararajan
1960	Thilakam	Tamil	Sandhegam Enum Oru Sarakku	R. Sudarsanam	S. C. Krishnan
1960	Thilakam	Tamil	B.O.Y. Boy Enna Paiyan	R. Sudarsanam	S. C. Krishnan
1960	Thilakam	Tamil	Aayi Mahamaayi Perai Cholli	R. Sudarsanam	L. R. Eswari & S. C. Krishnan
1960	Thilakam	Tamil	Karagam Karagam Karagam	R. Sudarsanam	S. C. Krishnan
1960	Thilakam	Tamil	Bayaaskoppu Paatthiyaa Dappaskoppu Paatthiyaa	R. Sudarsanam	T. M. Soundararajan
1960	Thilakam	Tamil	Thanjavoor Karagamadi Oh Mariammaa	R. Sudarsanam	T. M. Soundararajan, S. C. Krishnan & L. R. Eswari
1961	Amulya Kanuka	Telugu	Vidhiyo Nee Sodhanayo	C. N. Pandurangan	
1961	Bhakta Kuchela	Malayalam	Vikrama Raajendra	Br Lakshmanan	P. Leela
1961	Bhakta Kuchela	Malayalam	Madhu Pakarenam	Br Lakshmanan	P. Leela
1961	Bhakta Kuchela	Malayalam	Paaril Aarum Kandaal Viraykkume	Br Lakshmanan	P. Leela
1961	Ellam Unakkaga	Tamil	Manasu Pola Maapillai	K. V. Mahadevan	P. Susheela & L. R. Eswari
1961	Kanyaka Parameswari Mahatmyam	Telugu	Virahini Ninu Kore	R. Sudarsanam	M. L. Vasanthakumari
1961	Korada Veerudu	Telugu	Madhanaa Manasaayera	G. Ramanathan & J. Purushottam	Swarnalatha & K. Rani
1961	Kumara Raja	Tamil	Angadikadai Veedhiyile	T. R. Pappa	A. G. Rathnamala
1961	Naaga Nandhini	Tamil	Valluvan Vedham	R. Sudarsanam	Soolamangalam Jayalakshmi
1961	Naaga Nandhini	Tamil	Singame Singame	R. Sudarsanam	Soolamangalam Jayalakshmi
1961	Nagarjuna	Kannada		Rajan–Nagendra	
1961	Panam Panthiyile	Tamil	Thattan Kadaiyile	K. V. Mahadevan	T. M. Soundararajan
1961	Sabaash Mapillai	Tamil	Mutthu Pole Manjal Kotthu Pole	K. V. Mahadevan	Seerkazhi Govindarajan
1961	Thayilla Pillai	Tamil	Chinna Chinna Ooraniyaam	K. V. Mahadevan	
1962	Asthikkoru Aanum Asaikku Oru Ponnum	Tamil	Kan Vizhitthu Penn Orutthi	K. V. Mahadevan	
1962	Asthikkoru Aanum Asaikku Oru Ponnum	Tamil	Vedan Vaittha Kanniyile	K. V. Mahadevan	
1962	Azhagu Nila	Tamil	Muthu Muthaai Ennam	K. V. Mahadevan	
1962	Ethaiyum Thangum Ithaiyam	Tamil	Unakkum Enakkum Vegu Thooram Illai	T. R. Pappa	
1962	Indira En Selvam	Tamil	Kannipparuvam Aval	H. R. Padmanabha Sasthri & C. N. Pandurangan	P. B. Sreenivas
1962	Indira En Selvam	Tamil	Thitthikkum Thamizhile	H. R. Padmanabha Sasthri & C. N. Pandurangan	Soolamangalam Jayalakshmi
1962	Indira En Selvam	Tamil	Ullaasa Mangai Ilaamal Ponaal	H. R. Padmanabha Sasthri & C. N. Pandurangan	
1962	Konjum Salangai	Tamil	Kaana Kan Kodi Vendum	S. M. Subbaiah Naidu	
1962	Konjum Salangai	Tamil	Orumaiyudan	S. M. Subbaiah Naidu	
1962	Konjum Salangai	Tamil	Brahmma Thaalam Poda	S. M. Subbaiah Naidu	Radha Jayalakshmi
1962	Maadappura	Tamil	Oorukkum Theriyaadhu	K. V. Mahadevan	T. M. Soundararajan
1962	Maadappura	Tamil	Oorukkum Theriyaadhu (pathos)	K. V. Mahadevan	
1962	Maadappura	Tamil	Kannirandum Thevaiyillai	K. V. Mahadevan	
1962	Maadappura	Tamil	Sirikka Therinthaal Podhum	K. V. Mahadevan	T. M. Soundararajan
1962	Maadappura	Tamil	Manadhil Konda Asaiye	K. V. Mahadevan	P. Susheela
1962	Maya Mohini	Telugu	Sarveshu Dayavalana Janana Mandhina Thalli	Rajan–Nagendra	
1962	Nagarjuna	Telugu	Madilo Ninne Dalachu Cheline	Rajan–Nagendra	
1962	Pattinathar	Tamil	Thanga Bommai Pole	G. Ramanathan	
1962	Sengamala Theevu	Tamil	Aaduvom Poomaalai Poduvom	K. V. Mahadevan	L. R. Eswari
1962	Sengamala Theevu	Tamil	Kannaal Pesuvom Kaiyai Veesuvom	K. V. Mahadevan	L. R. Eswari
1962	Saradha	Tamil	Manamagale Marumagale Vaa Vaa	K. V. Mahadevan	Soolamangalam Jayalakshmi & L. R. Eswari
1962	Sreerama Pattabhishekam	Malayalam	Lankesha	Br Lakshmanan	P. Leela
1963	Chittoor Rani Padmini	Tamil	Vaanatthil Meen Ondru Kandai	G. Ramanathan	
1963	Kaithiyin Kathali	Tamil	Chitthirai Poongkodi Thendralai Marandhu	K. V. Mahadevan	A. L. Raghavan
1963	Karnan	Tamil	Poi Vaa Magale Poi Vaa	Viswanathan–Ramamoorthy	
1963	Kunkhumam	Tamil	"Kungumam"	K. V. Mahadevan	P. Susheela
1963	Paar Magale Paar	Tamil	Vetkkamaai Irukkudhadi	Viswanathan–Ramamoorthy	P. Leela
1963	Somavara Vrata Mahatyam	Telugu	Chinnari Papayi Vardhilavamma	Master Venu	K. Rani
1963	Thulasi Maadam	Tamil	Maiyai Thottu Ezhuthiyavar	K. V. Mahadevan	S. Janaki
1963	Vishnu Maya	Telugu	Jayajaya	L. Malleshwara Rao	A. P. Komala
1964	Bhakta Ramadasu	Telugu	Mohanaakaara Raamaa	V. Nagayya	Soolamangalam Jayalakshmi
1964	Bhakta Ramadasu	Telugu	Raamaa Paahimaam	V. Nagayya	Soolamangalam Jayalakshmi
1964	Bhakta Ramadasu	Telugu	Pahimam Sriramante	V. Nagayya	Soolamangalam Jayalakshmi
1964	Chinnada Gombe	Kannada	Sevanthige Chedinantha	T. G. Lingappa	
1964	Karna	Telugu	Povamma Ika Poyira	Viswanathan–Ramamoorthy	
1964	Kavala Pillalu	Telugu	Bidiyamayene Sakhi Chooda	Viswanathan–Ramamoorthy	P. Leela
1964	Magaley Un Samathu	Tamil	Annamidum Karangalinaal	G. K. Venkatesh	L. R. Eswari
1964	Muradan Muthu	Tamil	Sevvandhi Poochendu	T. G. Lingappa	
1964	Navarathri	Tamil	Vandha Naal Mudhal	K. V. Mahadevan	K. Jamuna Rani, L. R. Eswari & L. R. Anjali
1964	Veera Pandiyan	Tamil	Ungalai Thozhudhu.... Theeradha Kobangal Thisai Thaavi Nindraal	Rajan–Nagendra	
1965	Muthalali	Malayalam	Ponnaara Muthalaali	Pukazhenthi	S. Janaki & B. Vasantha
1965	Naanal	Tamil	Kuyil Koovi Thuyilezhuppa	V. Kumar	
1965	Naanal	Tamil	Kuyil Koovi Thuyilezhuppa (pathos)	V. Kumar	Major Sundararajan (dialogues)
1965	Vazhkai Padagu	Tamil	Poochoodi Pottu Vaitthu	Viswanathan–Ramamoorthy	L. R. Eswari
1966	Gowri Kalyanam	Tamil	Vellai Kamalathile	M. S. Viswanathan	
1966	Gowri Kalyanam	Tamil	Thiruppugazhai Paada Paada	M. S. Viswanathan	P. Susheela
1966	Motor Sundaram Pillai	Tamil	Thulli Thulli Vilaiyaada	M. S. Viswanathan	P. Susheela & L. R. Eswari
1967	Bama Vijayam	Tamil	Aani Muthu Vaangi Vandhen	M. S. Viswanathan	P. Susheela & L. R. Eswari
1967	Bhakta Prahlada	Tamil	Vaazhgave Mannulagam.... Indhita Logam Un Sondham	S. Rajeswara Rao	P. Susheela & S. Janaki
1967	Bhakta Prahlada	Telugu	Jayaho Jayaho.... Andhani Suraseemani	S. Rajeswara Rao	P. Susheela & S. Janaki
1967	Kandhan Karunai	Tamil	Thirupparang Kundratthil Nee Siritthaal	Kunnakkudi Vaidyanathan	P. Susheela
1967	Kandhan Karunai	Tamil	Aarumugam Aana Porul	K. V. Mahadevan	S. Janaki & Renuka
1967	Karpooram	Tamil	Vanangidum Kaigalin Vadivatthai	D. B. Ramachandra	P. Susheela
1967	Manam Oru Kurangu	Tamil	Pattanatthu Sandhaiyile Koodaik Kaari	D. B. Ramachandra	
1967	Padavidhara	Kannada	Karnaata Saamraajya	R. Rathna	
1967	Sundara Moorthy Nayanar	Tamil	Thalaiye Nee Vanangaai	S. M. Subbaiah Naidu	
1967	Sundara Moorthy Nayanar	Tamil	Parakkum En Killaigaal	S. M. Subbaiah Naidu	
1967	Sundara Moorthy Nayanar	Tamil	Maadhar Pirai Kanniyaarai	S. M. Subbaiah Naidu	Seerkazhi Govindarajan
1967	Pesum Dheivam	Tamil	Noorandu Kaalam Vaazhga	K. V. Mahadevan	L. R. Eswari & Sarala
1967	Seetha	Tamil	Nalam Kaakkum Kula Dheivame	K. V. Mahadevan	P. Susheela
1967	Thanga Valaiyal	Tamil	Sonnale Vaai Manakkum Velmuruga	K. V. Mahadevan	
1968	Neelagiri Express	Tamil	Thirutthani Murugaa Thennava Thalaivaa	T. K. Ramamoorthy	P. Susheela
1968	Thirumal Perumai	Tamil	Kaakkai Chiraginile	K. V. Mahadevan	
1968	Thirumal Perumai	Tamil	Karai Eri Meen Vilaiyadum	K. V. Mahadevan	P. Susheela
1968	Thirumal Perumai	Tamil	Margazhi Thingal	K. V. Mahadevan	
1969	Bageerathi	Kannada	Omkari Kalyani	G. K. Venkatesh	
1969	Bangaru Panjaram	Telugu	Challaramma Thallulu	S. Rajeswara Rao & B. Gopalam	
1969	Magizhampoo	Tamil	Vendiyadhai Vaarikolla Vaarunga	D. B. Ramachandra	
1969	Nirai Kudam	Tamil	Dhevaa.... Ulagai Kaana Ninaitthen	V. Kumar	T. M. Soundararajan, P. Susheela & K. Jamuna Rani
1969	Thaalaattu	Tamil	Malligaippoo Pottu	M. L. Srikanth	T. M. Soundararajan
1970	Arishina Kumkuma	Kannada	Sevavthige Chandinantha	T. G. Lingappa	
1970	Jeevanadi	Tamil	Aruvi Magal Alaiosai	V. Dakshinamoorthy	K. J. Yesudas
1970	Kann Malar	Tamil	Thodudaiya Seviyan.... Odhuvaar Un Peyar Odhuvaar	K. V. Mahadevan	M. Balamurali Krishna
1970	Vietnam Veedu	Tamil	Endrum Pudhidhaaga.... Ulagatthile Oruvan Ena	K. V. Mahadevan	P. Susheela & A. L. Raghavan
1970	Sri Krishnadevaraya	Kannada	Krishnana Hesare Lokapriya	T. G. Lingappa	P. B. Sreenivas & S. Janaki
1970	Yaen?	Tamil	Kannan Enakkoru Pillai	T. R. Pappa	
1971	Aathi Parasakthi	Tamil	Tak Dina Din	K. V. Mahadevan	
1971	Kulama Gunama	Tamil	Muthe Maragadhame....Pillai Kali Theera	K. V. Mahadevan	P. Susheela
1971	Sri Krishna Rukmini Satyabhama	Kannada	Dorakitu Nanagindu	R. Sudarsanam	
1971	Therottam	Tamil	Thuthiporkku.... Kandhanin Therottam	S. M. Subbaiah Naidu	Seerkazhi Govindarajan
1972	Annai Abirami	Tamil	Paatti Sonna Kadhaiyalla	Kunnakkudi Vaidyanathan	Sarala
1972	Appa Tata	Tamil	Illaadha Pillaikku Naan	V. Kumar	
1972	Dheivam	Tamil	Varuvaandi Tharuvaandi Malaiyaandi	Kunnakkudi Vaidyanathan	M. R. Vijaya
1972	Raman Thediya Seethai	Tamil	Yeannaa Neenga Enge Porel	M. S. Viswanathan	L. R. Eswari & Saibaba
1972	Ragasiya Penn 117	Tamil	Aasai Roja Paaru	C. N. Pandurangan	
1972	Sree Guruvayoorappan	Malayalam	Peelippoomudi	V. Dakshinamurthy	P. Leela
1973	Maru Piravi	Tamil	Kaveri Maandhoppu Kaniyo	T. R. Pappa	
1967	Bhakta Prahlada	Kannada	Jayaho Jayaho.... Andhadha Suraseema	S. Rajeswara Rao	P. Susheela & S. Janaki
1974	Gumasthavin Magal	Tamil	Ezhuthi Ezhuthi Pazhagi Vandhen	Kunnakkudi Vaidyanathan	M. R. Vijaya
1974	Gumasthavin Magal	Tamil	Therodum Veedhiyile Dharisikka Kaathirundhen	Kunnakkudi Vaidyanathan	
1974	Hemareddy Mallamma	Kannada	Nee Balle I Daasi Nanadaaseya	P. S. Divakar	
1974	Sisupalan	Tamil	Kai Varaindha Oviyatthai	Kunnakudi Vaidyanathan	
1974	Tiger Thathachari	Tamil	Kalyanam Oru Vizha	Soolamagalam Rajalakshmi	T. M. Soundararajan
1974	Tiger Thathachari	Tamil	Ezhumalai Vaasaa Vengkadesaa	Soolamagalam Rajalakshmi	Soolamangalam Jayalakshmi & K. Veeramani
1977	Sorgam Naragam	Tamil	Sendhoor Nizhalil	Shankar–Ganesh	
1977	Sri Krishna Leela	Tamil	Anbe Uyarndhadhu	S. V. Venkatraman	T. V. Rathnam
1978	Thanga Rangan	Tamil	Enga Rngan Thanga Rangan	M. S. Viswanathan	T. M. Soundararajan
1978	Thanga Rangan	Tamil	Thuppariya Porom Naanga	M. S. Viswanathan	Kovai Soundarajan
1979	Appothe Sonnene Kettiya	Tamil	Ethetho Ennangal	Soolamangalam Rajalakshmi	S. P. Balasubrahmanyam
1979	Kandhar Alangaram	Tamil	Kandhanukku Alangaaram Kandhar Alangaaram	Kunnakkudi Vaidyanathan	Soolamangalam Jayalakshmi
1984	Pillaiyar	Tamil	Pillaiyar Pillaiyar	Soolamangalam Rajalakshmi	Soolamangalam Jayalakshmi
1984	Pillaiyar	Tamil	Yaarai Vanagida Vendum	Soolamangalam Rajalakshmi	

== Deaths ==
Rajalakshmi died on 1 March 1992, aged 51, because of cardiac arrest and gastritis which lasted for about 12 years.

Jayalakshmi died at her home in Chennai on 29 June 2017, aged 80.
