= Thiruchi Loganathan =

Thiruchi Loganathan திருச்சி லோகநாதன்
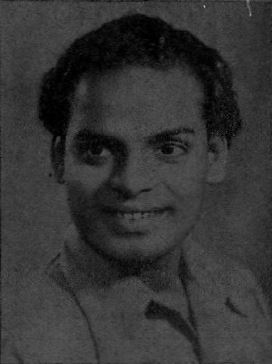
- Thiruchi Loganathan in 1951

Background information
- Born: Thiruchi Loganathan; 24 July 1924
- Origin: Tiruchirappalli, Madras Presidency, British India (now in Tamil Nadu, India)
- Died: 17 November 1989 (aged 65) Madras (now Chennai), Tamil Nadu, India
- Genres: Film music (playback singing), Indian classical music, Tamil patriotic
- Occupation: Singer
- Years active: 1947–1986

Thiruchi Loganathan (24 July 1924 – 17 November 1989) was an Indian playback singer of the Tamil film industry. He is known for his work in movies such as Manthiri Kumari (1950) and Sarvadhikari'. He married Rajalakshmi, daughter of actress C. T. Rajakantham. Their sons are: T. L. Maharajan, Deepan Chakravarthy, TL Kamalakannan, and T.L. Thyagarajan, who are also popular playback singers.

== Career ==
=== Music composers he sang for ===
- S. M. Subbaiah Naidu
- C. R. Subburaman
- G. Ramanathan
- V. Dakshinamoorthy
- S. Dakshinamurthi
- S. V. Venkatraman
- T. R. Ramanathan
- T. A. Kalyanam
- M. S. Gnanamani
- S. N. Chaami
- Br Lakshmanan
- T. R. Pappa
- N. S. Balakrishnan
- Shankar–Jaikishan
- T. V. Raju
- S. B. Dinakar Rao
- K. V. Mahadevan
- M. K. Athmanathan
- A. V. Natarajan
- Viswanathan–Ramamoorthy
- R. Sudarsanam
- G. Govindarajulu Naidu
- Parur S. Anantharaman
- Master Venu
- S. Rajeswara Rao
- Arun & Raghavan
- T. M. Ibrahim
- C. N. Pandurangan
- C. Ramchandra
- B. Gopalam
- S. Hanumantha Rao
- Ghantasala
- P. Adinarayana Rao
- T. G. Lingappa
- M. Ranga Rao
- M. B. Srinivasan
- A. M. Rajah
- T. Chalapathi Rao
- Vedha
- Rajan–Nagendra
- V. Kumar
- Shankar–Ganesh

=== Playback singers he sang with ===
He sang memorable duets mostly with P. Leela and Jikki. He also sang with many others including, M. L. Vasanthakumari, M. S. Rajeswari, L. R. Eswari, P. A. Periyanayaki, T. V. Rathnam, A. G. Rathnamala, A. P. Komala, N. L. Ganasaraswathi, Radha Jayalakshmi, K. Jamuna Rani, K. Rani, Lakshmi Shankar, P. Susheela, S. Janaki, A. V. Saraswathi, T. S. Bagavathi, Vadivambal, Swarnalatha, K. Swarna and U. R. Chandra.

He also sang duets with male singers, most notably with Seerkazhi Govindarajan and Mariyappa. Other singers that he sang with include S. C. Krishnan, T. M. Soundararajan, G. Ramanathan, A. L. Raghavan, C. R. Subburaman, P. B. Sreenivas, K. R. Chellamuthu, Maadhavan, Shanmugasundharam, V. T. Rajagopalan, G. K. Venkatesh and T. L. Maharajan.

The singing actors he sang with were N. S. Krishnan, U. R. Jeevarathinam and Friend Ramasamy.

== Discography ==
Year	Film	Language	Song	Music Director	Co-Singer
1947	Rajakumari	Tamil	Kaattinile Naangal Vazhvadhe	S. M. Subbaiah Naidu	K. V. Janaki
1948	Abhimanyu	Tamil	Pudhu Vasandhamaame Vaazhvile	S. M. Subbaiah Naidu & C. R. Subburaman	U. R. Jeevarathinam
1948	Abhimanyu	Tamil	Oh Aiyamare Ammamare Vaanga	S. M. Subbaiah Naidu & C. R. Subburaman	Friend Ramasamy & K. V. Janaki
1948	Abhimanyu	Tamil	Pudhu Vasandhamaamey Vaazhvile	S. M. Subbaiah Naidu & C. R. Subburaman	
1948	Abhimanyu	Tamil	Pudhu Vasandhamaamey Vaazhvile	S. M. Subbaiah Naidu & C. R. Subburaman	U. R. Jeevarathinam
1949	Kanniyin Kaadhali	Tamil	Puvi Raja	S. M. Subbaiah Naidu & C. R. Subburaman	M. L. Vasanthakumari
1949	Kanniyin Kaadhali	Tamil	Purappaduvome Anne	S. M. Subbaiah Naidu & C. R. Subburaman	
1949	Kanniyin Kaadhali	Tamil	Yositthu Paaraamal	S. M. Subbaiah Naidu & C. R. Subburaman	
1950	Ezhai Padum Padu	Tamil	Vaanamudhe Ondraai	S. M. Subbaiah Naidu	M. L. Vasanthakumari & P. A. Periyanayaki
1950	Krishna Vijayam	Tamil	Eppadi Sakippadhu	C. S. Jayaraman & S. M. Subbaiah Naidu	A. L. Raghavan, S. S. Mani Bhagavathar, T. M. Soundararajan & K. S. Angamuthu
1950	Manthiri Kumari	Tamil	Vaaraai Nee Vaaraai	G. Ramanathan	Jikki
1950	Manthiri Kumari	Tamil	Ulavum Thendral Kaatrinile	G. Ramanathan	Jikki
1951	Devaki	Tamil	Perinbame Vaazhivile	G. Ramanathan	P. Leela
1951	Devaki	Tamil	Hello My Dear Hello	G. Ramanathan	A. G. Rathnamala
1951	Jeevitha Nauka	Malayalam	Ghoraandhakaaramaaya Bheekararaavilippol	V. Dakshinamoorthy	P. Leela
1951	Pichaikkaari	Tamil	Vanaraniye Endhan Manaraniye	V. Dakshinamoorthy	P. Leela
1951	Pichaikkaari	Tamil	Sagayam Yarumallada	V. Dakshinamoorthy	
1951	Pichaikkaari	Tamil	Kaarmugil Keeri Velippadum	V. Dakshinamoorthy	P. Leela & Kaviyoor Revamma
1951	Pichaikkaari	Tamil	Paavamaaam Idhu Paavaai	V. Dakshinamoorthy	
1951	Pichaikkaari	Tamil	Yaaradi Kalli Neethaan	V. Dakshinamoorthy	P. Leela
1951	Pichaikkaari	Tamil	Nanmaigal Seidhaal	V. Dakshinamoorthy	
1951	Sarvadhikari	Tamil	Aanazhaga Enadhu Kaikal	S. Dakshinamurthi	P. Leela
1951	Sarvadhikari	Telugu	Poru Teeripoye Janmabhoomilo	S. Dakshinamurthi	T. M. Soundararajan
1951	Singari	Tamil	Maaname Pradhaaname.... Manampol Vaazhvu Edhu	S. V. Venkatraman, T. R. Ramanathan & T. A. Kalyanam	
1951	Singari	Tamil	Kani Suvai Tharum Amudhaave	S. V. Venkatraman, T. R. Ramanathan & T. A. Kalyanam	Jikki
1951	Singari	Tamil	Ezhaigal Vaazhave Idamillaiyaa	S. V. Venkatraman, T. R. Ramanathan & T. A. Kalyanam	
1951	Rajambal	Tamil	Ullondru Vaitthu	M. S. Gnanamani	
1951	Yachakan	Malayalam	Vismritharaay Vismritharaay	S. N. Chaami	
1951	Yachakan	Malayalam	Janakeeya Raajyaneethiyil	S. N. Chaami	
1952	Aathmasakhi	Malayalam	Jalajala Jal Jal	Br Lakshmanan	
1952	Amma	Tamil	Vidhiyo Paingkili	V. Dakshinamurthy	
1952	Priyasakhi	Tamil	Jalajala Jal Jal	Br Lakshmanan	
1952	Mappillai	Tamil	Dosu Kodukka Venum	T. R. Pappa & N. S. Balakrishnan	A. G. Rathnamala
1952	Puratchi Veeran	Tamil	Mei Thiyaaga Puviyile Vaazhnaalum	Shankar–Jaikishan	
1952	Puratchi Veeran	Tamil	Kaadhal Kanave.... En Kannil	Shankar–Jaikishan	P. A. Periyanayaki
1952	Rani	Tamil	Ulle Onnu Veliye Onnu	C. R. Subburaman	C. R. Subburaman & P. Susheela
1952	Shyamala	Tamil	Indha Kaala Krishnanena	G. Ramanathan, T. V. Raju & S. B. Dinakar Rao	Jikki
1953	Asai Magan	Tamil	Akkam Pakkam	V. Dakshinamoorthy	A. G. Rathnamala
1953	Manithan	Tamil	Pongi Varum Muzhu Madhiyai	S. V. Venkatraman	
1953	Naalvar	Tamil	Vaanamidhile	K. V. Mahadevan	M. L. Vasanthakumari
1953	Ponni	Tamil	Ulagam Pora Pokkile	S. M. Subbaiah Naidu	M. M. Mariyappa
1953	Ponni	Tamil	Aaduvadhum Paaduvadhum Edhukku	S. M. Subbaiah Naidu	M. M. Mariyappa
1953	Thirumbi Paar	Tamil	Thannale Panpadum Unnale Vaazhvile	G. Ramanathan	P. Leela
1953	Ulagam	Tamil	Kaadhalinaal Ulagame	M. S. Gnanamani	N. L. Ganasaraswathi
1953	Ulagam	Tamil	Pongi Varum.... Karpanai Ellaam Ondru Thiranda	M. S. Gnanamani	
1954	Ammaiyappan	Tamil		K. V. Mahadevan	
1954	Nanban	Tamil	Athai Magan Thaanunga	G. Ramanathan	Jikki
1954	Nanban	Tamil	Kan Sollum Kaadhal	G. Ramanathan	P. Leela
1954	Nanban	Tamil	Kaadhal Rahasiyame	G. Ramanathan	Jikki
1954	Latchathipathi	Tamil	Kali Kalandha Kali Kaalam	T. Chalapathi Rao	M. Thangappan & S. V. Ponnusamy
1954	Latchathipathi	Tamil	Nambatheer Logamutrum	T. Chalapathi Rao	
1954	Latchathipathi	Tamil	Vaango Vaango Gaandi Bommai	T. Chalapathi Rao	
1954	Ratha Paasam	Tamil	Dallu Dallu Dallu	M. K. Athmanathan & A. V. Natarajan	
1954	Sorgavasal	Tamil	Sandhosham Theda Vendum Vaazhvile	Viswanathan–Ramamoorthy	T. V. Rathnam
1954	Vaira Malai	Tamil	Koovamal Koovum Kogilam	Viswanathan–Ramamoorthy	M. L. Vasanthakumari
1954	Vaira Malai	Tamil	Vanjamidho Vaanjaiyidho	Viswanathan–Ramamoorthy	M. L. Vasanthakumari
1955	Asai Anna Arumai Thambi	Tamil	Aanaana Pattadhellaam	K. V. Mahadevan	A. V. Saraswathi
1955	Vedan Kannappa	Tamil	Aasaikkoru Aann Pillai	R. Sudarsanam	T. S. Bagavathi
1955	Doctor Savithri	Tamil	Jegamengum Pugalongum Veera Dheera Singam	G. Ramanathan	N. S. Krishnan
1955	Gulebagavali	Tamil	Villendhum Veeranellam	Viswanathan–Ramamoorthy	P. Leela
1955	Gulebagavali	Tamil	Villendhum Veeranellam	Viswanathan–Ramamoorthy	P. Leela & G. K. Venkatesh
1955	Gomathiyin Kaadalan	Tamil	Kongu Naatu Sengkarumbe	G. Ramanathan	
1955	Gomathiyin Kaadalan	Tamil	Vaana Meedhil Neendhi Odum	G. Ramanathan	
1955	Kalvanin Kadhali	Tamil	Sadharam Nadagam	G. Govindarajulu Naidu	Seerkazhi Govindarajan & Shanmugasundharam
1955	Manoratham	Tamil	Nilave Needhan Thoodhu Sellayo	G. Ramanathan	P. Leela
1955	Manoratham	Tamil	Raaja Premaiyaal Alai Modhudhe	G. Ramanathan	P. Leela
1955	Nalla Thangai	Tamil	Anbulla Azhagene.... Inba Vaazhvil	G. Ramanathan	Jikki
1955	Nalla Thangai	Tamil	ABCD Padikkiren	G. Ramanathan	Seerkazhi Govindarajan
1955	Nallavan	Tamil	Nambathe Unnaiye Nambathe	M. S. Gnanamani	
1955	Nallavan	Tamil	Vaazhvil Inbam Kaanuma	M. S. Gnanamani	P. Leela
1955	Pennarasi	Tamil	Inbam Enggum Ingge	K. V. Mahadevan	M. S. Rajeswari
1955	Pennarasi	Tamil	Chandhiran Madhiyam.... Paadhaiyin Mele Vizhiyaai Vaitthu	K. V. Mahadevan	M. S. Rajeswari, S. C. Krishnan & U. R. Chandra
1955	Porter Kandan	Tamil	Kondattam Kondattam	Viswanathan–Ramamoorthy	S. C. Krishnan, K. R. Chellamutthu, Maadhavan & K. Rani
1955	Town Bus	Tamil	Ponnana Vazhve Mannagi Poma	K. V. Mahadevan	M. S. Rajeswari & Radha Jayalakshmi
1955	Ulagam Palavitham	Tamil	Akkam Pakkam Yaarum Kanndaa	N. S. Balakrishnan	K. Rani
1955	Valliyin Selvan	Tamil	Kanna Unnai Kandathum	Parur S. Anantharaman	
1956	Kaalam Mari Pochu	Tamil	Inidhaai Naame Inaindhiruppome	Master Venu	Jikki
1956	Kaalam Mari Pochu	Tamil	Poliyo Poli Poliyo Poli Aaayira Kaalam	Master Venu	
1956	Kaalam Mari Pochu	Tamil	Maariye Kelammaa Kaaniyile	Master Venu	Jikki
1956	Kaalam Mari Pochu	Tamil	Vaangaame Povome Naame	Master Venu	
1956	Kaalam Mari Pochu	Tamil	Idar Pattu Vayir Erindha	Master Venu	
1956	Kaalam Mari Pochu	Tamil	Punnagai Thanai Veesu	Master Venu	Jikki & K. Rani
1956	Mathar Kula Manickam	Tamil	Payaname Kattuvom Premamani	S. Rajeswara Rao	
1956	Mathar Kula Manickam	Tamil	Naalum Nalla Naalu	S. Rajeswara Rao	A. P. Komala
1956	Paasavalai	Tamil	Aiyaiya Neenga Ambalaiyaanga	Viswanathan–Ramamoorthy	K. Rani
1956	Paditha Penn	Tamil	Vaadaadha Solai Malar Pootha Verlai	Arun & Raghavan	K. Rani
1956	Paditha Penn	Tamil	Gunamum Kula Dharma Gnaanamum	Arun & Raghavan	K. Rani
1956	Punniyavathi	Tamil	Kannum Moodi Uranguga Nee En	V. Dakshinamoorthy	P. Leela
1956	Sadhaaram	Tamil	Mariyaadhar.... Manmeedhu Maanam	G. Ramanathan	
1956	Vetri Veeran	Tamil	Godhai En Chela Kiliye	T. M. Ibrahim	Jikki
1957	Aaravalli	Tamil	Chinna Kutti Naatthana	G. Ramanathan	
1957	Aaravalli	Tamil	Kummalam Pottadhellam	G. Ramanathan	Seerkazhi Govindarajan
1957	Aaravalli	Tamil	Maanamellaam Pona Pinne	G. Ramanathan	T. M. Soundararajan
1957	Aaravalli	Tamil	Pazhakkam Illaadha Kazhudhai Kitta	G. Ramanathan	Seerkazhi Govindarajan
1957	Aaravalli	Tamil	Manjal Poosi Varum Konjum Paarvaiyile	G. Ramanathan	Seerkazhi Govindarajan
1957	Aaravalli	Tamil	Thirumbi Paaru Thirumbi Paaru	G. Ramanathan	Seerkazhi Govindarajan
1957	Aaravalli	Tamil	Idhu Sengkamma Adhu Angkamma	G. Ramanathan	Seerkazhi Govindarajan & A. G. Rathnamala
1957	Iru Sagodharigal	Tamil	Joraana Sarakkirukku Paarungga	S. Rajeswara Rao	
1957	Iru Sagodharigal	Tamil	Laattariyaale Baateri Pole	S. Rajeswara Rao	Jikki
1957	Maya Bajaar	Tamil	Kalyana Samaiyal Saadham	Ghantasala & S. Rajeswara Rao	
1957	Maya Bajaar	Tamil	Ashtadhikkilum Soozhum	Ghantasala & S. Rajeswara Rao	
1957	Raja Rajan	Tamil	Aala Pirandha Rajapaadu	K. V. Mahadevan	Muthukoothan & Vadivambal
1957	Raja Rajan	Tamil	Vettaiyaada Vaarum Mannavaa	K. V. Mahadevan	S. C. Krishnan & Vadivambal
1958	Boologa Rambai	Tamil	Om Endra Pranavatthin.... Kalli Malai Kurinji Nilam	C. N. Pandurangan	S. C. Krishnan, Jikki & A. G. Rathnamala
1958	Maalaiyitta Mangai	Tamil	Saatailyilaa Pambaram Pol	Viswanathan–Ramamoorthy	dialogues Pandari Bai
1958	Neelavukku Neranja Manasu	Tamil	Cycle Varudhu Cycle Varudhu	K. V. Mahadevan	L. R. Eswari
1958	Neelavukku Neranja Manasu	Tamil	Originality Osandha Quality	K. V. Mahadevan	
1958	Paanai Pidithaval Bhaagyasaali	Tamil	Purushan Veettil Vaazha Pogum Penne	S. V. Venkatraman & S. Rajeswara Rao	
1958	Paanai Pidithaval Bhaagyasaali	Tamil	Penne Unadhazhagai Kandu	S. V. Venkatraman & S. Rajeswara Rao	Jikki
1958	Paanai Pidithaval Bhaagyasaali	Tamil	Pachadikkettha Kichadi Sambaa	S. V. Venkatraman & S. Rajeswara Rao	T. V. Rathnam
1958	Petra Maganai Vitra Annai	Tamil	Aambalkki Kann Potta... Gum Gum Gum	Viswanathan–Ramamoorthy	Jikki
1958	Petra Maganai Vitra Annai	Tamil	Konaadha Maratthile...Onne Onnu Adhu	Viswanathan–Ramamoorthy	Seerkazhi Govindarajan, Jikki & P. Susheela
1958	Sampoorna Ramayanam	Tamil	Veenai Kodi Udaiya Vendhane	K. V. Mahadevan	
1958	Thai Pirandhal Vazhi Pirakkum	Tamil	Aasaiye Alai Pole	K. V. Mahadevan	
1958	Vanjikottai Valiban	Tamil	Vetrivel Veeravel	C. Ramchandra	Seerkazhi Govindarajan & T. V. Rathnam
1958	Vanjikottai Valiban	Tamil	Vaikkal Vandi Baaram	C. Ramchandra	Seerkazhi Govindarajan & P. Susheela
1958	Vanjikottai Valiban	Tamil	Thaedi Thaedi Alaigirene	C. Ramchandra	P. Susheela
1959	Aana Valarthiya Vanampadi	Malayalam	Jodiyulla Kaale Joraayi	Br Lakshmanan	
1959	Alli Petra Pillai	Tamil	Kathirukken Veliyoram Unakkaga	K. V. Mahadevan	L. R. Eswari
1959	Alli Petra Pillai	Tamil	Nalla Naalu Romba Nalla Naalu	K. V. Mahadevan	T. M. Soundararajan & Seerkazhi Govindarajan
1959	Arumai Magal Abirami	Tamil	Dootti Dootti Dootti	V. Dakshinamoorthy	K. Jamuna Rani
1959	Azhagarmalai Kalvan	Tamil	Thaen Thoongum Thenpodhigai Charalile	B. Gopalam	
1959	Azhagarmalai Kalvan	Tamil	Kaattu Vazhi Pogaiyile	B. Gopalam	Jikki
1959	Azhagarmalai Kalvan	Tamil	Chithiram Kalainduvida	B. Gopalam	
1959	Bhagya Devathai	Tamil	Hara Hara Siva Siva Ambala Vaanaa	Master Venu	
1959	Bhagya Devathai	Tamil	Thanne Thaananne	Master Venu	K. Jamuna Rani
1959	Bhagya Devathai	Tamil	Paavam Oridamaa, Pazhiyum Oridamaa	Master Venu	
1959	Engal Kuladevi	Tamil	Onnum Theriyaatha Kanni Oru Kannni	K. V. Mahadevan	L. R. Eswari
1959	Kaveriyin Kanavan	Tamil	Paranthu Vantha Painkiliye Kannamma	K. V. Mahadevan	
1959	Kaveriyin Kanavan	Tamil	Thanjavur Bommai Pole	K. V. Mahadevan	
1959	Kaveriyin Kanavan	Tamil	Kannathile Vizhum Pallathile.... Velli Anname Vaaraayo	K. V. Mahadevan	
1959	Kaveriyin Kanavan	Tamil	Alai Modhuthe Nenjam	K. V. Mahadevan	K. Jamuna Rani
1959	Manaiviye Manithanin Manickam	Tamil	Un Thiruvilaiyaadal Arivaayaa	S. Hanumantha Rao	
1959	Manaiviye Manithanin Manickam	Tamil	Kaathiruppom Kai Pidippom Kanne	S. Hanumantha Rao	A. G. Rathnamala
1959	Manaiviye Manithanin Manickam	Tamil	Buddharaiyum Muhamadhaiyum	S. Hanumantha Rao	
1959	Manimekalai	Tamil	Avaniyil Pudhu Murai Araneriye Kanda	G. Ramanathan	N. L. Ganasaraswathi
1959	Naalu Veli Nilam	Tamil	Ooraar Urangaiyile	K. V. Mahadevan	L. R. Eswari
1959	Panchaali	Tamil	Maa Manakkudhu Thaen Manakkudhu	K. V. Mahadevan	Seerkazhi Govindarajan
1959	Panchaali	Tamil	Namma Naattu Vaithiyathai	K. V. Mahadevan	S. C. Krishnan
1959	Raja Sevai	Tamil	Baleh Pervali Kannappaa	T. V. Raju	A. L. Raghavan
1959	Thayapola Pillai Noolapola Selai	Tamil	Paatti Sollum Kadhai	K. V. Mahadevan	Seerkazhi Govindarajan, Soolamangalam Rajalakshmi & L. R. Eswari
1959	Vaazhkai Oppandham	Tamil	Rambaiyum Oorvasiyum	Ghantasala	
1959	Vannakili	Tamil	Adikkira Kaidhan Anaikkum	K. V. Mahadevan	P. Susheela
1959	Veerapandiya Kattabomman	Tamil	Aathukkulle Ootthu Vetti	G. Ramanathan	K. Jamuna Rani, V. T. Rajagopalan & A. G. Rathnamala
1959	Yaanai Valartha Vaanambadi	Tamil	Jodi Kaalai Maade Neeye	Br Lakshmanan	
1960	Adutha Veettu Penn	Tamil	Kanngalum Kavi Paadudhe	P. Adinarayana Rao	Seerkazhi Govindarajan
1960	Chavukkadi Chandrakantha	Tamil	Usuru Namma Kaiyile	G. Ramanathan	
1960	Ellorum Innaattu Mannar	Tamil	Miruga Inam Thaan Sirandhadhu	T. G. Lingappa	A. L. Raghavan & P. Susheela
1960	Irumbu Thirai	Tamil	Kaiyila Vaanginen Paiyile Podala	S. V. Venkatraman	
1960	Irumbu Thirai	Tamil	Era Pudichavanum Enguleesu Padichavanum	S. V. Venkatraman	
1960	Irumbu Thirai	Tamil	Nikkatuma Pogatuma	S. V. Venkatraman	K. Jamuna Rani
1960	Ivan Avanethan	Tamil	Vaazhkayin Paadam	M. Ranga Rao	S. Janaki
1960	Ivan Avanethan	Tamil	Kanne Adi Penne	M. Ranga Rao	
1960	Kadavulin Kuzhandhai	Tamil	Thamizhan Endru Solladaa	G. Ramanathan	
1960	Kadavulin Kuzhandhai	Tamil	Ilan Thamizhaa Unnai Paarkka	G. Ramanathan	
1960	Kuzhandhaigal Kanda Kudiyarasu	Tamil	Unnai Kandu Roja Chendu	T. G. Lingappa	K. Rani
1960	Kuzhandhaigal Kanda Kudiyarasu	Tamil	Jaadhagam Namakku Saadhagam	T. G. Lingappa	
1960	Ondrupattal Undu Vazhvu	Tamil	Annachi Vandhachi	Viswanathan–Ramamoorthy	L. R. Eswari
1960	Paadhai Theriyudhu Paar	Tamil	Unmai Orunaal Veliyaagum	M. B. Sreenivasan	
1960	Ponni Thirunaal	Tamil	Karumbu Villai Edutthu	K. V. Mahadevan	Seerkazhi Govindarajan, A. L. Raghavan, S. V. Ponnusamy & L. R. Eswari
1960	Ponni Thirunaal	Tamil	Ponggi Varum Kaaviriye	K. V. Mahadevan	Seerkazhi Govindarajan, Soolamangalam Rajalakshmi & L. R. Eswari
1960	Raja Bakthi	Tamil	Sooraadhi Soorar	G. Govindarajulu Naidu	
1960	Raja Makudam	Tamil	Vaarungo Vaarungo Vaarungo	Master Venu	
1960	Rathinapuri Ilavarasi	Tamil	Magudam Kaakka Vandha	Viswanathan–Ramamoorthy	A. P. Komala
1960	Sangilithevan	Tamil	Sattaiyile Theychukalaam	T. G. Lingappa	P. Leela
1960	Thangam Manasu Thangam	Tamil	Iruudhaa Amma	K. V. Mahadevan	A. L. Raghavan
1960	Vidivelli	Tamil	Kodutthu Paar Paar Paar	A. M. Rajah	A. M. Rajah, P. Susheela & Jikki
1960	Vidivelli	Tamil	Kaaru Savari Joru	A. M. Rajah	Jikki
1960	Veerakkanal	Tamil	Pottukkitta Rendu Perum	K. V. Mahadevan	L. R. Eswari
1960	Veerakkanal	Tamil	Kaiyil Valai Kulunga	K. V. Mahadevan	Seerkazhi Govindarajan, P. Susheela & L. R. Eswari
1961	Kappalottiya Thamizhan	Tamil	Endru Thaniyum Indha	G. Ramanathan	
1961	Kappalottiya Thamizhan	Tamil	Velli Panimalayil	G. Ramanathan	Seerkazhi Govindarajan
1961	Kappalottiya Thamizhan	Tamil	Thaneer Vittom	G. Ramanathan	
1961	Pangaaligal	Tamil	Chinna Arumbu Malarum	S. Dakshinamurthi	
1961	Punar Jenmam	Tamil	Paadam Sariyaa Maaster	T. Chalapathi Rao	Jikki
1961	Yar Manamagan	Tamil	Kadalamma Kadalamma	Br Lakshmanan	P. Leela & Renuka
1962	Madadhipathi Magal	Tamil	Maanilamel Sila Maanidaraal	C. Ramchandra	
1962	Madadhipathi Magal	Tamil	Vidhi Vinnil Meerudhe	C. Ramchandra	Lakshmi Shankar
1962	Pattinathar	Tamil	Thiruvenkada	G. Ramanathan	
1963	Konjum Kumari	Tamil	Thoppule Oru Naal Siritthaayadi	Vedha	A. G. Rathnamala
1963	Lava Kusa	Tamil	Thappu Thappunu Thuniyai Thuvaichu	Ghantasala	L. R. Eswari
1964	Chithraangi	Tamil	Unakku Onnu Enakku Onnu Irukkudhu Manasu	Vedha	A. G. Rathnamala
1964	Karnan	Tamil	Mazhai Kodukkum	Viswanathan–Ramamoorthy	
1964	Karnan	Tamil	Naanich Chivandhana	Viswanathan–Ramamoorthy	
1964	Karnan	Tamil	Aayiram Karanggal Neetti	Viswanathan–Ramamoorthy	Seerkazhi Govindarajan, P. B. Sreenivas & T. M. Soundararajan
1964	Veera Pandiyan	Tamil	Aiyaiyo Raavanaa Naan Enna Solven	Rajan–Nagendra	Swarnalatha
1964	Veera Pandiyan	Tamil	Sanga Thamizhe.... Malarum Paruvam Kadhai Sollumaa	Rajan–Nagendra	S. Janaki
1964	Veera Pandiyan	Tamil	Pazhani Aandavaa Murugaa Pazhani Aandavaa	Rajan–Nagendra	L. R. Eswari
1965	Sarasa BA	Tamil	Kanni Paruvam Thulludhunga	Vedha	K. Jamuna Rani
1973	Arangetram	Tamil	Kannanai Kaanbadharko	V. Kumar	K. Swarna
1973	Radha	Tamil	Naanum Paithiyam	M. S. Viswanathan	A. L. Raghavan & S. V. Ponnusamy
1979	Panchaboothangal	Tamil	Om Sakthi Om Sakthi Parasakthi	Shankar–Ganesh	
1979	Panchaboothangal	Tamil	Prahlaadha Naadagam	Shankar–Ganesh	T. L. Maharajan
1986	Maruthi	Tamil	Ramasami Thoothan Endhan Peru	Shankar–Ganesh	
