= C. N. Pandurangan =

Indian music director

Cuddalore Nagarathnam Pandurangan (1912 – 1975) was a noted music director who scored music for Tamil, Kannada, Telugu and Sinhala movies. C. N. Pandurangan was an Indian music director who worked mainly in South Indian films.

== Early life ==
Cuddalore Nagarathinam Pandurangan (CNP) was born in 1912. His father had a government job, conducted religious discourses and was also an exponent of Harikatha. CNP commenced his music lessons under his father and accompanied him on the stage. He was later put under the tutelage of Chittoor Subramaniam Pillai (the vocalist who also taught Madurai Somu).

== Career ==
CNP became a veena exponent and was spotted and hired by K. Subramaniam. CNP's first assignment as a music composer was the 1948 Sinhalese movie Kapati Arakshakaya directed by K. Subramaniam. The movie was a runaway hit and CNP's compositions sung by the famous Eddie Jayamane and Rukmani Devi became very popular. This led to CNP composing the songs for a few more Sinhalese movies in later years such as Veradunu Kurumanama, Amma, Sihinaya and Devasundari. Vembathur Krishnan mentioned working with CNP in reverential terms.

The first Tamil movie which had songs composed by CNP was Kamavalli (1948). Despite some good classical songs written by Papanasam Sivan and rendered by Nagercoil Mahadevan and S. Varalakshmi. Even though CNP was not flooded with offers, he carried on in Tamil movies till 1978. He also composed music for Telugu movies where most of them are Tamil-Telugu bilingual movies.

He worked in Kannada movie too such as Bhakta Mallikarjuna (1955), Kacha Devayani (1956), Devasundari (1962). Later Sri Purandaradasaru (1967) based on the legendary saint-composer which had singers such as M. L. Vasanthakumari, M. Balamuralikrishna, P. B. Srinivas and S. Janaki.

Composer Vedha worked as his associate for some years and learned the nuances of music composition before branching off on his own. Pukazhenthi worked under him for a few years, before teaming up with K. V. Mahadevan. Shyam commenced his film career as a violinist under him. B. A. Chidambaranath was part of his troupe.

Shyam mentioned that unlike the other composers who would compose playing the harmonium, CNP would play the notes on the veena and sing the tune. He could come up with 5 to 6 tunes for every song and the directors would sit mesmerized, spoilt for choice. His assistant Munuswamy would then play each segment on the harmonium to the instrumentalists. CNP shared a very good rapport with all the great lyricists and singers of the time. He used to encourage the lyricists to come out with appropriate, poetic lines and would not hesitate to amend the tune to accentuate the beauty of the lyrics. CNP was also very particular about the choice of singers, Shyam recalled, and each song would go the singer who CNP thought could do it the best justice. CNP would escort all his troupe members to Harrisons and treat them to a sumptuous meal at his own expense. Sham recalls CNP as A great artiste and A great human being.

CNP worked with G. Ramanathan in Pudhu Vazhvu and with Viswanathan–Ramamoorthy in Pona Machaan Thirumbi Vandhan. He also collaborated with Meenakshi Subramaniam in Kacha Devayani (Kannada) and Pandithevan (Tamil).

He worked with singers like T. M. Soundararajan, A. M. Rajah, Seerkazhi Govindarajan, Thiruchi Loganathan, C. S. Jayaraman, V. N. Sundharam, P. B. Sreenivas, S. C. Krishnan, T. A. Mothi, K. R Chellamuthu, A. L. Raghavan, M. Balamuralikrishna, S. V. Ponnusamy, K. M. Mani Rajan, M. L. Vasanthakumari, P. A. Periyanayaki, P. Leela, Jikki, T. V. Rathnam, A. P. Komala, K. Jamuna Rani, P. Suseela, Radha Jayalakshmi, A. G. Rathnamala, Soolamangalam Jeyalakshmi, Soolamangalam Rajalakshmi, K. V. Janaki, K. Rani, G. Kasthoori, S. Janaki, and L. R. Eswari.

The singing actors T. R. Mahalingam, K. R. Ramasamy, S. Varalakshmi, V. Nagayya, B. Jayamma, N. S. Krishnan, T. A. Madhuram, P. S. Govindhan, C. S. Pandiyan and J. P. Chandrababu also sang memorable songs under his compositions.

== Style ==
CNP composed music for 40 movies spread over a period of 30 years. Many of them are collaboration with other composers where he had only a handful of songs to compose himself. Even though many of the movies were commercial failures, CNP was influenced by classical roots to develop inventive arrangements, working with a variety of singers.

== Works ==
Some compositions of C. N. Pandurangan, include:

- Manmohanadass Gandhi from Geetha Gandhi by P. A. Periyanayaki
- Good Luck! Good Luck from En Thangai by C.S. Pandiyan & A. G. Rathnamala
- Aadum Oonjalai Pole from En Thangai by T. A. Mothi & P. Leela
- Aasai Roja Paaru from Ragasiya Penn 117 by Soolamangalam Rajalakshmi
- Sirpi Sedhukkaadha Porchilaiye from Edhir Paradhathu by Jikki
- Sirpi Sedhukkaadha Porchilaiye from Edhir Paradhathu by A. M. Rajah
- Singara Roopa Karunaa from Mamiyar by S. Varalakshmi
- Dance Baby Dance from Gumastha by M. L. Vasanthakumari
- Jeeva Gaana Veena Naan from Bhoologa Rambai by P. Suseela
- Naanaada Nee Paadu Kannaa from Mala Oru Mangala Vilakku by Soolamangalam Rajalakshmi
- Naan Paada Nee Aadu Kanne from Mala Oru Mangala Vilakku by P. B. Srinivas
- Chandi Miranda Kaadu Kollaadhu from Pandithevan by S. Janaki
- Nee Aadinaal Oor Aadidum from Pandithevan by J. P. Chandrababu & K. Jamuna Rani
- Inbama Kondadum from Indira En Selvam by P. B. Srinivas & K. Rani
- Kanni Paruvam Aval from Indira En Selvam by P. B. Srinivas & Soolamangalam Rajalakshmi

CNP has worked with Radha Jayalakshmi in almost all of his compositions which brings the best out of her . Some of the songs are:

- Jegam Ezhum Neeye from Edhir Paradhathu, solo
- Kannalar Ingu Varuvaar from Bhoologa Rambai, solo
- Aasai Nenjame from Bhoologa Rambai with A. M. Rajah
- Kanavu Ninaivaagum from Menaka, solo
- Thellathelindha Thenamudhe from Indira En Selvam, solo
- Anbaana Mozhi Pesum from Solaimalai Raani with A. M. Rajah
- Annai Nee En Vaazhvile from Mala Oru Mangala Vilakku, solo
- Kannum Karuthum from Pandithevan with S. Janaki & K. Rani
- Aadhaaram Nin Paadham Ambigaiye from Pona Machaan Thirumbi Vandhan, solo
- Kottu Melam Kovililm from Pudhu Vazhvu, solo

== Personal life ==
CNP and his wife Tarabai had 6 children. One of his sons, Mohanarangan was a famed flautist. CNP died in 1975 at the age of 63.

== Filmography ==
Year	Film	Language	Director	Banner	Co-Music Directors
1948	Kamavalli	Tamil	Manickam	Baskar Pictures	
1948	Kapati Arakshakaya	Sinhala	Jyotish Sinha & K. Subramanyam	Ceylon Theatres	
1948	Naveena Valli	Tamil	T. Balaji Singh	Santhanam Pictures	
1948	Sri Krishna Thulabaram	Tamil	T. Balaji Singh	Santhanam Pictures	
1948	Veradunu Kurumanama	Sinhala	Jyotish Sinha	Ceylon Theatres	
1949	Amma	Sinhala	Sirisena Wimalaweera	Navajeewana Film	
1949	Geetha Gandhi	Tamil	K. Subramanyam	Madras United Artists Corporation	Br Lakshmanan
1951	Maya Pilla	Telugu	R. Prakash	Prakash Shankar Pictures	
1952	En Thangai	Tamil	Ch. Narayana Murthy	Ashoka Pictures	
1953	Naa Chellelu	Telugu	Ch. Narayana Murthy	Ashoka Pictures	
1953	Gumastha	Tamil	R. M. Krishnaswami	Aruna Films	G. Ramanathan & V. Nagayya
1953	Gumastha	Telugu	R. M. Krishnaswami	Aruna Films	G. Ramanathan & V. Nagayya
1953	Mamiyar	Tamil	K. Vembu	Sri Gajanana Productions	
1953	Kodarikam	Telugu	K. Vembu	Sri Gajanana Productions	
1954	Edhir Paradhathu	Tamil	Ch. Narayana Murthy	Saravanabava Pictures & Unity Pictures	
1954	En Magal	Tamil	K. V. R. Acharya; M. K. R. Nambiar	Asoka Pictures	
1954	Pona Machaan Thirumbi Vandhan	Tamil	C. S. Rao	Mercury Films	M. S. Viswanathan
1955	Bhakta Mallikarjuna	Kannada	C. V. Raju	Jairaj Productions	
1955	Menaka	Tamil	V. C. Suburamman	Kasturi Films	Vedha
1956	Kacha Devayani	Kannada	K. Subramanyam	Morak Pvt Limited	Meenakshi Subramanyam
1956	Vazhvile Oru Naal	Tamil	A. Kasilingam	Mercury Films	T. G. Lingappa & S. M. Subbaiah Naidu
1956	Verum Pechu Alla	Tamil	Joseph Pallippad	Principle Productions	
1957	Pudhu Vazhvu	Tamil	M. K. Thyagaraja Bhagavathar	Sarvodaya Pictures	G. Ramanathan
1958	Boologa Rambai	Tamil	D. Yoganand	Asoka Pictures	
1958	Booloka Rambha	Telugu	D. Yoganand	Asoka Pictures	
1959	Pandithevan	Tamil	K. Subramanyam	Morak Pvt Limited	Meenakshi Subramanyam
1959	Sihinaya	Sinhala	T. Janaki Ram	Jayanthi Producers	
1960	Kottadhari	Telugu	K. Subramanyam	Morak Pvt Limited	Ramana
1960	Solaimalai Rani	Tamil	A. Rajaram		
1961	Amulya Kanuka	Telugu	T. Janakiraman	Maheswari Pictures	
1962	Devasundari	Kannada	C. V. Raju		
1962	Devasundari	Sinhala	C.V. Raju	Royal Studio	
1962	Indira En Selvam	Tamil	C. Padmanaban	Ashoka Pictures	H. R. Padmanabha Sasthri
1963	Devasundari	Telugu	H. V. Babu	Royal Studio	
1963	Kubera Theevu	Tamil	G. Vishwanathan	Nithya Kalyani Films	
1967	Sri Purandara Dasaru	Kannada	C. V. Raju & R. Ramamurthy	Sri Hamsa Chithra	
1968	Sathiyam Thavaradhey	Tamil	Pondy Selvaraj	Ammal Films	
1972	Thiruneelakandar	Tamil	C. P. Jambulingam	Vahini - Vasu	
1972	Rahasiyapenn 117	Tamil			
1975	Kadhavai Thattiya Mohini Paey	Tamil	Rajaram	Anuradha International Films	
1978	Vetri Thirumagal	Tamil	H. V. Babu	Vivek Agencies	
