= Bhagya Devathai =

1959 film

Bhagya Devatha
- Poster
- Directed by: Tapi Chanakya
- Screenplay by: Thanjai N. Ramaiah Dass
- Starring: Gemini Ganesan; Savitri; M. N. Nambiar; Rajasulochana
- Music by: Master Venu
- Production company: Sri Sarathy Studios
- Release date: 12 June 1959
- Country: India
- Language: Tamil

Bhagya Devatha is a 1959 Indian Tamil language film directed by Tapi Chanakya. The film stars Gemini Ganesan and Savitri. It was made in Telugu with the title Bhagya Devatha, also directed by Chanakya.

== Cast ==
List adapted from Thiraikalanjiyam

Male cast

- Gemini Ganesan
- M. N. Nambiar
- K. Natarajan

Female cast

- Savitri
- Rajasulochana
- M. S. S. Bhagyam

== Production ==
The film was produced under the banner Sri Sarathi Studios and was directed by Tapi Chanakya.

== Soundtrack ==
Music was composed by Master Venu while the lyrics were penned by Thanjai N. Ramaiah Dass.

Song	Singer/s	Length
"Kokkarako Koovidichammaa"	P. Susheela	02:33
"O Maathaa ... Thanjamendren"	P. Susheela	
"Thanne Thaananne"	Thiruchi Loganathan & K. Jamuna Rani	
"Kavi Paadum Kangalinaale"	Ghantasala & K. Jamuna Rani	02:45
"Maadhargal Vaazhkaiyil Yendhiramaa"	K. Jamuna Rani	
"Illara Poongaavile Inaindhu Aadum"	Ghantasala & P. Susheela	03:59
"Raajaadhi Raaja Vaesham Podu Raaja"	K. Jamuna Rani & group	
"Hara Hara Siva Siva Ambala Vaanaa"	Ghantasala	
"Paavam Oridamaa, Pazhiyum Oridamaa"	Thiruchi Loganathan	

== Bibliography ==
- Rajadhyaksha, Ashish; Willemen, Paul (1998) [1994]. Encyclopaedia of Indian Cinema. British Film Institute and Oxford University Press. ISBN 0-19-563579-5.
