= Sadhaaram =

- Poster
- Directed by: V. C. Subbaraman
- Written by: A. K. Velan & A. T. Krishnaswami (dialogue)
- Story by: Sankaradas Swamigal
- Produced by: V. C. Subbaraman
- Starring: P. Bhanumathi; K. R. Ramasamy; Gemini Ganesan
- Cinematography: P. Sridhar
- Music by: G. Ramanathan
- Production company: Kasthuri Films
- Release date: 13 April 1956
- Country: India
- Language: Tamil

Sadhaaram is a 1956 Indian Tamil-language film directed and produced by V. C. Subbaraman, and starring P. Bhanumathi, K. R. Ramasamy and Gemini Ganesan. Based on the play of the same name by Sankaradas Swamigal, it was released on 13 April 1956, and was commercially unsuccessful.

== Cast ==
Actor	Role
P. Bhanumathi	Sadhaaram
K. R. Ramasamy	
Gemini Ganesan	
M. N. Rajam	
T. S. Balaiah	
V. K. Ramasamy	
K. Sarangapani	
M. S. S. Bhagyam	
P. S. Vengadasalam	
C. K. Saraswathi	
K. S. Angamuthu	

== Production ==
Sadhaaram is the third film based on the play of the same name by Sankaradas Swamigal, after a 1930 silent film and Naveena Sadaram (1935).

== Soundtrack ==
The music was composed by G. Ramanathan. Lyrics were penned by Thanjai N. Ramaiah Dass and A. Maruthakasi.

Song	Singers	Lyrics	Length
"Ponggi Varum Pudhu Nilavee"	T. M. Soundararajan & P. Bhanumathi		03:11
"Anggum Inggum Paartthidaamal"	Jikki		05:19
"Raajaatthi Kanne Raajaatthi"	K. R. Ramasamy		02:42
"Annaiye Kaaliyamma Eeswari"	T. M. Soundararajan, V. T. Rajagopalan, A. P. Komala & A. G. Rathnamala		05:46
"Azhagu Brammachchaari Vaarum Aiyaa"	K. Jamuna Rani		02:29
"Kaayam Karuvappillai Soodandi"	S. C. Krishnan & K. Sarangapani		02:25
"Enggum Oli Veesudhe Ennai Thedi"	P. Bhanumathi, A. P. Komala & A. G. Rathnamala		03:10
" Ninaindhu Ninaindhu Nenjam Urugudhe"	T. M. Soundararajan	A. Maruthakasi	03:11
"Laaba Nashtamadaa Naina"	Seerkazhi Govindarajan & V. K. Ramasamy		02:11
"Nal Vaakuu Nee Kodadi"	K. R. Ramasamy		01:32
"Madhiyaadhaar Vaasal...Mann Meedhu Maanam"	Thiruchi Loganathan		02:54
"Pudhumai Enna Solven"	T. M. Soundararajan		03:24
"Thaaye Ezhai Mugam"	P. Bhanumathi		
"Villaadhi Villanadaa.... Thullaattam Pottadhellaam"	K. R. Ramasamy		02:39
