= Pudhu Vazhvu =

- Film poster
- Directed by: M. K. Thyagaraja Bhagavathar
- Written by: Elangovan; A. K. Velan; Iraimudimani
- Produced by: M. K. Thyagaraja Bhagavathar
- Starring: M. K. Thyagaraja Bhagavathar; Lalitha; Madhuri Devi
- Cinematography: R. Sampath
- Edited by: V. B. Natarajan
- Music by: G. Ramanathan; C. N. Pandurangan
- Production company: Sarvodaya Pictures
- Release date: 8 March 1957
- Running time: 124 minutes
- Country: India
- Language: Tamil

Pudhu Vazhvu (transl. New Life) is a 1957 Indian Tamil-language film produced and directed by M. K. Thyagaraja Bhagavathar. The film stars himself, Lalitha and Madhuri Devi. It was released on 8 March 1957.

== Plot ==
Vaikuntam is a lad who lives in a village. He is a good singer and in love with a lass, Nagammal. But Nagammal's brother is against their love. One day he ties Vaikundam to a tree. Vaikundam is rescued by a rich woman who was passing by. She takes Vaikundam to her city. When she realises that Vaikundam is a talented singer, she renames him Geethamani and promotes him. He becomes famous and rich. However, he neglects his parents and treats them poorly. His lover, Nagammal, tries to kill herself because of his behaviour. The rest of the story deals with how Geethamani realises his delusion and reconciles with his parents and Nagammal.

== Cast ==
Adapted from The Hindu article and the opening credits

Male cast

- M. K. Thyagaraja Bhagavathar as Vaikuntam, Geethamani
- N. S. Krishnan as Nallathambi
- T. S. Balaiah as Neelakantan
- T. S. Durairaj as Raman
- K. A. Thangavelu as Thangavelu
- Alwar Kuppusami as Santhanam
- P. B. Rangachari as Vaikuntam's father
- Yadhartham Ponnusami Pillai as Yadhartham
- V. K. Achari as Sahadevan
- V. R. Rajagopal as Thambi
- Rajagopal as Thangavelu's worker

Female cast

- Madhuri Devi as Subha
- Lalitha as Nagamma
- T. A. Mathuram as Muthunagai
- Kumari Thulasi as Mahima
- Ambika as Dancer
- K. N. Kamalam as Chellam
- T. V. Kalyani as Vaikundam's mother

== Soundtrack ==
Music was composed by G. Ramanathan and C. N. Pandurangan, while the lyrics were penned by Papanasam Sivan, Thanjai N. Ramaiah Dass, A. Maruthakasi, Natarajasundaram, Saravanabhavananda and Suratha.

Track listing
No.	Title	Singer(s)	Length
1.	"Appaa Naan Vendudhal Kettu"	M. K. Thyagaraja Bhagavathar	04:30
2.	"Unmai Ondre Pesum"	M. K. Thyagaraja Bhagavathar	03:43
3.	"Chuttum Vizhi Chudar Than"	M. K. Thyagaraja Bhagavathar
4.	"Paadupattu Panaththai"	M. K. Thyagaraja Bhagavathar
5.	"Gnaanap Pazhathai Pizhindhu Piravaa"	M. K. Thyagaraja Bhagavathar
6.	"Dhaanam Avasiyam Adhanaal"	M. K. Thyagaraja Bhagavathar	04:29
7.	"Deviye Enai Kan Paaramma"	M. K. Thyagaraja Bhagavathar
8.	"Udhanadha Dhillilaana Dhadheem"	M. K. Thyagaraja Bhagavathar
9.	"Yaarai Nondhu Kolvadhinge"	M. K. Thyagaraja Bhagavathar
10.	"Vanjaka Cheygai Nanjinum Kodidhu"	M. K. Thyagaraja Bhagavathar
11.	"Annaiyum Thandhaiyum Munnari"	M. K. Thyagaraja Bhagavathar	02:48
12.	"Thaen Kuyil Pole Isaipaadum"	M. K. Thyagaraja Bhagavathar, Jikki	05:04
13.	"Maanai Pole Odi"	M. K. Thyagaraja Bhagavathar, P. Leela	03:23
14.	"Devi En Kanavum Nanavaaguma"	P. Leela
15.	"Alavu Thaan Oru Alavu Thaan"	N. S. Krishnan, T. A. Mathuram
16.	"Aadudhinnaanga Adhai Paarka Veenum"	N. S. Krishnan, T. A. Mathuram
17.	"Kottu Melam Kovilile"	Radha Jayalakshmi	02:15
18.	"Avasiyam Avasiyam (dance song)"	Gajalakshmi

== Release and reception ==
Pudhu Vazhvu was released in select theatres on 8 March 1957, and in others on 22 March. Kanthan of Kalki criticised the film for its filmmaking style, cinematography and lighting. Film historian Randor Guy wrote in 2014 that the film was a flop at the box office but the songs are still worth listening even after more than half a century.
