= Pona Machaan Thirumbi Vandhan =

- Theatrical release poster
- Directed by: C. S. Rao
- Written by: V. Seetharaman (dialogues)
- Screenplay by: Mercury Films Story Department
- Based on: Punarjanmam by Thumilan
- Produced by: T. S. Venkataswami
- Starring: Sriram; Kusalakumari
- Cinematography: Jiten Bannerjee; V. Kumara Devan
- Edited by: P. M. Ramamoorthy
- Music by: M. S. Viswanathan; C. N. Pandurangan
- Production company: Mercury Films
- Release date: 27 November 1954
- Country: India
- Language: Tamil

Pona Machan Thirumbi Vandhan (transl. The previous husband has returned) is a 1954 Indian Tamil-language comedy film directed by C. Srinivasa Rao. The dialogues were written by V. Seetharaman and screenplay by Mercury Films' Story Department. Based on the novel Punarjanmam by Thumilan, it stars Sriram and Kusalakumari. The film was released on 27 November 1954 and did not succeed commercially.

== Plot ==
The film tells of a young man named Sambu. He is from a well-to-do family and spends his days chewing betel leaves and tobacco. He is fond of telling stories about old times to his servant Kittan. The young man is fond of his sister Chandra. He is keen on getting her married to a suitable young man and keeping the couple in his house. He releases a peculiar advertisement asking for a bridegroom who has to send money of ₹1,000 (equivalent to ₹92,000 or US$950 in 2023) to be considered for the alliance. A young man Thyagu, who was mostly in North India and sick of Chappathi – Kuruma, wishes to get back home and replies to the ad. Another person and his sister Vimala then come to Sambhu's house. Not interested in the "Ad for groom" business. Chandra leaves the house. She meets Thyagu and unaware of each other's identity, they fall in love. They meet with a car accident and the rich owners takes them home for treatment, thinking they are a married couple. Afraid of scandals, they change their names, leading to more complications. Resolving the complications occupies the rest of the film.

== Cast ==
Male cast

- Sriram as Thyagu
- Shankaramoorthi as Rathnam
- Thangavelu as Sambu
- Ganapathi Bhatt
- Friend Ramasami
- Sampathkumar
- T. K. Ramachandran
- Velappan
- C. P. Kittan as Kittan
- Ganesh Singh
- Raja Wahab Kashmiri

Male Support Cast

- Shankar, Mani Bhagavathar, Kottayam Kailasa Bhagavathar, Prasad, Varadarajan, Kuntu Pillai, and R. K. Krishnan Mudaliar.

Female cast

- Kusalakumari as Chandra
- Lakshmikantha as Vimala
- Angamuthu as
- Rathnam
- Ranganayaki
- Jayagowri
- Saraswathi
- Saroja
- Varada Bai
- Rukmani
- Lakshmi

== Soundtrack ==
Music was composed by M. S. Viswanathan and C. N. Pandurangan..

Song	Singers	Lyrics	MD	Length
"Aatharam Nin Paadham"	Radha Jayalakshmi	V. Seetharaman	M. S. Viswanathan	03:37
"Pennai Veeddil"	P. Leela & A. G. Rathnamala	V. Seetharaman	M. S. Viswanathan	
"Koduthidu Neeye Koduthidu"	A. G. Rathnamala & K. R. Chellamuthu	V. Seetharaman	M. S. Viswanathan	03:11
"Yaarai Yematra Vandheer"	U. R. Jeevarathinam	V. Seetharaman	M. S. Viswanathan	03:28
"Idhayam Ennum"	A. M. Rajah & U. R. Jeevarathinam	V. Seetharaman	C. N. Pandurangan	02:41
"Odam Polae Namathu"	V. N. Sundaram, A. L. Raghavan, T. Sathyavathi & Subbulakshmi	V. Seetharaman	C. N. Pandurangan	02:34
"Yeno Naanum Vaaduren"	Jikki	N. S. Chithambaram	C. N. Pandurangan	03:03

== Release ==
Pona Machan Thirumbi Vandhan was released on 27 November 1954, and did not succeed commercially.
