= Mamiyar =

- Directed by: K. Vembu
- Screenplay by: M. S. Subramaniam
- Story by: Sadasivabrahmam
- Starring: R. S. Manohar; S. Varalakshmi; Relangi; Suryakantham; Girija
- Cinematography: P. L. Roy
- Edited by: V. B. Nataraja Mudaliyar
- Music by: C. N. Pandurangan
- Production company: Sri Gajanana Productions
- Release date: 4 March 1953
- Running time: 196 minutes
- Country: India
- Language: Tamil

Mamiyar (/ˈmɑːmɪjɑːr/ transl. Mother in-law) is a 1953 Indian Tamil-language film drama film directed by K. Vembu. The film stars R. S. Manohar and S. Varalakshmi. It was released on 4 March 1953.

== Cast ==
List adapted from the database of Film News Anandan and from Thiraikalanjiyam.

Male cast

- R. S. Manohar
- Relangi
- B. R. Panthulu
- Ganapathi Bhat

Female cast

- S. Varalakshmi
- M. S. S. Bhagyam
- Suryakantham
- Girija
- Thilakam

== Production ==
The film was produced under the banner Sri Gajanana Productions and was directed by K. Vembu. Sadasivabrahmam wrote the story while the dialogues were written by M. S. Subramaniam. B. L. Rai was in charge of cinematography and V. B. Nataraja Mudaliyar handled the editing. Art direction was done by Vali and still photography was by Aboobucker. The film was shot at Revathi studios and processed at Vijaya laboratory.

The film was also made in Telugu with the title Kodarikam.

== Soundtrack ==
Music was composed by C. N. Pandurangan while the lyrics were written by M. S. Subramaniam, Ambikapathy, Suratha and Udumalai Narayana Kavi.

Song	Singer/s
"Mahaa Ganapathae Gajaananaa"	M. L. Vasanthakumari
"Penn Ivale Miga"	M. L. Vasanthakumari
"Arul Purivaaye Jaganmaathaa"	S. Varalakshmi
"Aiyirandu Thingalaayi"	S. Varalakshmi
"Devi Eswari Jagathamba"	S. Varalakshmi
"Leela Hallo, Leela Open"	A. P. Komala, P. A. Periyanayaki & Chandra
"Vaazhvinile Nannaal"	A. M. Rajah & S. Varalakshmi
"Singara Roopa Karunaa"	S. Varalakshmi & group
"Indha Paarinil Ummaiye"	
"Eeramillaa Nenjathaar"	
"Azhagu Nilaavinile"	
