= Verum Pechu Alla =

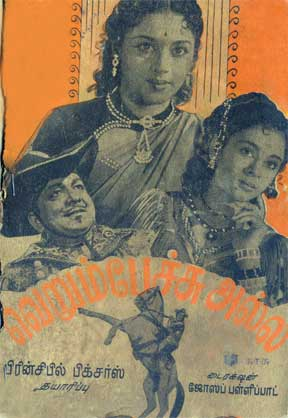
- Song book cover
- Directed by: Joseph Pallipad
- Screenplay by: A. K. Velan; K. Paramanantham
- Produced by: Joseph Pallipad
- Starring: T. S. Balaiah; Padmini; S. Varalakshmi; Ragini
- Cinematography: P. Ramasamy; V. G. Nair
- Music by: C. N. Pandurangan
- Production company: Principal Pictures
- Release date: 16 May 1956
- Running time: 171 minutes
- Country: India
- Language: Tamil

Verum Pechu Alla (transl. No Empty Talk) is a 1956 Indian Tamil-language film directed by Joseph Pallipad. The film stars T. S. Balaiah and Padmini. It was released on 16 May 1956.

== Plot ==
Maragatham is an innocent girl who grew up in a remote village. A zamindar sets eyes on her and she also yields to his passions dreaming that her child will be a Zamindar. But the zamindar deserts her. Maragatham's father pleads with the zamindar to accept his daughter But the zamindar shoots him dead. Maragatham becomes furious and vows in front of the zamindar that she will destroy him with the help of the child she is bearing. After 26 years Maragatham's son goes to take revenge from the zamindar. In the meantime, the zamindar is bringing up an adopted daughter. The young man falls in love with that girl. What happens next forms the rest of the story.

== Cast ==
List adapted from the database of Film News Anandan.

Male cast

- T. S. Balaiah
- Nandaram
- M. R. Sudharshan

Female cast

- Padmini
- S. Varalakshmi
- Ragini

== Production ==
The film was produced and directed by Joseph Pallipad. A. K. Velan and K. Paramanantham wrote the screenplay and dialogues. P. Ramasamy and V. G. Nair handled the cinematography. Sohanlal, Vembatti Satyam and Hiralal were in charge of choreography.

== Soundtrack ==
Music was composed by C. N. Pandurangan.

Song	Singer/s	Lyricist
"Thaaru Thaaru Enna Thaaru"		Thanjai N. Ramaiah Dass
"Kaapikku Porutham Stove"		Thanjai N. Ramaiah Dass
"Paaraayi Ratha Bandham Vidumaa"		Thanjai N. Ramaiah Dass
"Naattin Perumai Uyara"		V. A. Gopalan
"Mei Kaadhal Vaanil"		V. A. Gopalan
"Andharathai Villaakkum"		V. A. Gopalan
"Nidhi Izhandhaalum Nee Madhi"		V. A. Gopalan
"Kallanai Nee Kandathundo"		V. A. Gopalan
"Mazhai Megam Kaanaamal"	A. M. Rajah & Jikki	A. Maruthakasi
