= Bhooloka Rambai =

1958 film by D. Yoganand

- Theatrical release poster
- Directed by: D. Yoganand
- Story by: K. Ramnoth
- Produced by: S. Savundappan; C. Chenna Kesavan
- Starring: Gemini Ganesan; Anjali Devi
- Cinematography: J. G. Vijayam
- Edited by: P. G. Mohan
- Music by: C. N. Pandurangan
- Production company: Ashoka Pictures Salem Gugai
- Release dates: 14 January 1958 (Tamil); 14 March 1958 (Telugu)
- Running time: 168 minutes
- Country: India
- Languages: Tamil; Telugu

Bhooloka Rambai is a 1958 Indian Tamil-language film, directed by D. Yoganand and produced by Ashoka Pictures. The film stars Gemini Ganesan and Anjali Devi, with P. S. Veerappa, M. N. Nambiar, Rajasulochana, K. A. Thangavelu and A. Karunanidhi in supporting roles. The film was simultaneously shot in Telugu as Bhooloka Rambha. The Tamil version was released on 14 January 1958 and the Telugu version was released on 14 March 1958.

== Cast ==
Cast (Tamil)	Cast (Telugu)	Role (Tamil)	Role (Telugu)
Gemini Ganesan		Prince Bhuvanendran	Prince Bhuvanendra
Anjali Devi		Princess Boologa Rambai	Princess Boologa Rambai
P. S. Veerappa	R. Nageswara Rao	General Veera Kesari	General Veera Kesari
Rajasulochana		Princess Meghala	Princess Meghala
E. V. Saroja		Poongavanam	Poongavanam
A. Karunanidhi	Relangi	Mahodharan	Vasanthudu
E. R. Sahadevan	Mukkamala	Nagasooran	
M. Saroja		Sornam	Sornam
Lakshmi Prabha		Bhuvanendran's mother	Bhuvanendra's mother
Reeta		Maya Mohini	Maya Mohini
B. Saroja Devi		Special appearance in the song "Thean Pole Thedi Vaa"/"Guma Gumalade Puvvula"	

Tamil version

- C. K. Saraswathi as Witch Rangamma
- M. N. Nambiar as Puththi Sigamani
- K. A. Thangavelu as Varnam
- P. S. Venkatachalam as Boopathy
- K. Sairam as Sira Kesari
- K. Natarajan as Bhuvanendran's father

Telugu version

- Chalam as Sumanthudu

== Soundtrack ==
Music was composed by C. N. Pandurangan.

Song	Singer	Lyrics	Length
"Kannaalar Ingu Varuvaar	Radha Jayalakshmi	Kovi Manisekaran	02:54
"Thaen Pole Thedi Vaa"	Jikki	Ku. Ma. Balasubramaniam	02:59
"Vanna Mayil Murugan"	A. G. Rathnamala & K. Rani	Pavalar Velayuthasamy & Suratha	02:59
"Jeeva Gaana Veena Naan"	P. Suseela	Villiputhan	03:12
"Aalai Paaru Solakollai Bommai"	Seerkazhi Govindarajan, S. V. Ponnusamy & K. Rani	Puratchidasan	01:50
"Aasai Nenjamey"	A. M. Rajah & Radha Jayalakshmi	Kovi. Manisekaran	03:17
"Un Kanniladum Jaalam Yaavum"	A. M. Rajah & P. Suseela	Villiputhan	03:43
"Kodagu Malai Koottamungga"	Seerkazhi Govindarajan, S. V. Ponnusamy & K. Rani	Puratchidasan	04:37
"Ambaa Arul Purivai"	Radha Jayalakshmi	Yaanai Vaithyanathaiyar	
"Gangadharane Karunakarane"	Radha Jayalakshmi	Ku. Sa. Krishnamoorthi	
"Om Endra Pranavatthin...Kalli Malai"; Kurinji Nilam	Jikki, Thiruchi Loganathan, S. C. Krishnan, A. G. Rathnamala and group	P. K. Atkondan	06:48
"Arasakumara Bhuvanendrane"	P. Susheela, S. Janaki & Group	Mugavai Rajamanickam	
"Vaazhvil Nee Manimagudam"	P. Susheela	Villiputhan	

== Release ==
Bhoologa Rambai was initially scheduled to release on 10 January 1958, but pushed to four days later.
