= Pandithevan =

- Theatrical release poster
- Directed by: K. Subramanyam
- Screenplay by: Muhavai Rajamanickam
- Story by: K. Subramanyam
- Produced by: K. Subramanyam
- Starring: M. G. Chakrapani; Rajasulochana; T. K. Balachandran
- Cinematography: U. Rajagopal
- Edited by: C. P. Jambulingam; S. Ratnasabapathi
- Music by: C. N. Pandurangan; Meenakshi Subramanyam
- Production company: Morak Limited
- Distributed by: Srinivas Films
- Release date: 7 March 1959
- Running time: 3 hrs 27 mins (18714 ft.)
- Country: India
- Language: Tamil

Pandithevan is a 1959 Indian Tamil-language film, produced and directed by K. Subramanyam. The film stars M. G. Chakrapani, T. K. Balachandran, Rajasulochana and B. S. Saroja.

== Cast ==
The following list was adapted from the database of Film News Anandan.

- M. G. Chakrapani
- Rajasulochana
- T. K. Balachandran
- B. S. Saroja
- S. A. Asokan
- T. P. Muthulakshmi
- S. V. Sahasranamam
- Ragini
- J. P. Chandrababu
- T. A. Mathuram

== Production ==
This is the last film directed by K. Subramanyam. The film was shot in Neptune Studios that later was named Sathya Studios. (Now, it houses the MGR Janaki College of Arts and Sciences.)

K. Subramaniam's wife was a co-music director to this film. Meenakshi Subramaniam was a music composer, a lyricist in Sanskrit and Tamil and an instrumentalist who played Veena, Violin and Harmonium.

== Soundtrack ==
Music was composed by C. N. Pandurangan and Meenakshi Subramanyam.

Song	Singer/s	Lyricist	Duration (m:ss)
"Kal Udaithu Malai Pilandhu"	P. B. Sreenivas, T. V. Rathnam, A. G. Rathnamala, S. V. Ramanan, Gomathi and Group	Muhavai Rajamanickam	
"Chandi Miranda Kaadu Kollaadhu"	S. Janaki	Muhavai Rajamanickam	03:09
"Vaanga Vaanga Nalla Manamulla"	K. Jamuna Rani	Muhavai Rajamanickam	03:06
"Kannum Karuthum"	(Radha) Jayalakshmi, K. Rani, S. Janaki & Group	Muthukoothan	05:35
"Sekku Poal Asaignchaadum"	K. Rani	Muthukoothan	05:21
"Solluradhai Sollipidden"	J. P. Chandrababu	Pattukkottai Kalyanasundaram	03:14
"Kodumai Purivathe"	Seerkazhi Govindarajan	Pattukkottai Kalyanasundaram	
"Vaa Vaa Sooriyane"	K. Jamuna Rani	Pattukkottai Kalyanasundaram	03:02
"Vambu Mozhi Maari Maari"	P. Leela	Pattukkottai Kalyanasundaram	03:23
"Nee Aadinaal Oor Aadidum"	J. P. Chandrababu & K. Jamuna Rani	Pattukkottai Kalyanasundaram	03:21
