= Mala Oru Mangala Vilakku =

- Theatrical release poster
- Directed by: S. Mukherjee
- Screenplay by: A. L. Narayanan (dialogues)
- Story by: S. Mukherjee
- Produced by: Madhuri Devi
- Starring: V. Nagayya; Madhuri Devi; N. N. Kannappa; Kamini
- Cinematography: C. J. Mohan Rao
- Music by: C. N. Pandurangan
- Production company: Radhakrishna Films
- Release date: 27 March 1959
- Running time: 161 minutes
- Country: India
- Language: Tamil

Mala Oru Mangala Vilakku (transl. Mala is an auspicious lamp) is a 1959 Indian Tamil-language film directed by S. Mukherjee. The film stars V. Nagayya, N. N. Kannappa and Madhuri Devi.

== Cast ==
List adapted from the database of Film News Anandan and from Thiraikalanjiyam.

Male cast

- V. Nagayya
- N. N. Kannappa
- Duraisamy
- Narayanapillai
- R. Muthuraman

Female cast

- Madhuri Devi
- Kamini
- V. Saradambal

== Production ==
The film was produced by actress Madhuri Devi under the banner Radhakrishna Films. Her husband, S. Mukherjee, directed the film and also wrote the story on which the screenplay was based. A. L. Narayanan wrote the dialogues. Cinematography was handled by C. J. Mohan Rao.

== Soundtrack ==
Music was composed by C. N. Pandurangan.

Song	Singer/s	Lyricist	Duration (m:ss)
"Aadudhu Poongodi Aahaa"	R. Balasaraswathi Devi	Villiputhan	02:27
"Naanaada Nee Paadu Kannaa"	Soolamangalam Rajalakshmi	Villiputhan	02:53
"Unnai Panindhen"	(Radha) Jayalakshmi	Villiputhan	
"Annai Nee En Vaazhvile"	(Radha) Jayalakshmi	Villiputhan	02:32
"Mathi Valartha.... Ammaa Endru Azhuthaalum"	A. M. Rajah	Villiputhan	03:28
"Vaazhvinil Kaanum Adhisayame"	Sirkazhi Govindarajan	Villiputhan	02:46
"Penn Manam Pole Un Gunam"	P. B. Sreenivas & Soolamangalam Rajalakshmi	Villiputhan	02:54
"Naan Paada Nee Aadu Kanne"	P. B. Sreenivas	Villiputhan	03:08
"Pattu Maenikkaari Velicham Pakkam"	Thangappan & A. V. Saraswathi	Era. Pazhanichami	02:32
