= Chavukkadi Chandrakantha =

1960 film

- Directed by: M. Radhakrishnan
- Screenplay by: A. L. Narayanan
- Story by: J. Rangaraju
- Produced by: M. Radhakrishnan
- Starring: T. S. Balaiah; Sowcar Janaki; T. K. Ramachandran; Tambaram Lalitha; P. S. Veerappa
- Cinematography: N. Prabhakar
- Edited by: B. V. Manickam
- Music by: G. Ramanathan
- Production company: Aruna Films
- Release date: 16 December 1960
- Running time: 187 minutes
- Country: India
- Language: Tamil

Chavukkadi Chandrakantha (transl. Chandrakantha who whips) is a 1960 Indian Tamil language film directed by M. Radhakrishnan. The film stars T. S. Balaiah and Sowkar Janaki.

== Cast ==
The following list is adapted from the database of Film News Anandan

Male cast

- T. S. Balaiah
- T. K. Ramachandran
- Jagadheesan
- Veerappa
- Radhakrishnan

Female cast

- Sowcar Janaki
- Vanaja
- Tambaram Lalitha

== Production ==
The film was produced and directed by M. Radhakrishnan under the banner Aruna Films. The story was written by J. Rangaraj and A. L. Narayanan wrote the dialogues. Cinematography was done by N. Prabhakar while the editing was done by B. V. Manickam. Art direction was by C. Ramraj. A. K. Chopra, Chinni Sampath handled the choreography. Still photography was done by R. N. Rangaraja Rao.

== Soundtrack ==
The music was composed by G. Ramanathan, while the lyrics were penned by A. Maruthakasi, A. L. Narayanan, Udumalai Narayana Kavi, Ka. Mu. Sheriff and Ku. Ma. Balasubramaniam.

Song	Singer/s	Lyricist	Length
"Aadchiyum Soozhchchiyum Sernthaal"	P. Leela, A. G. Rathnamala		
"Ennippaar Vaazhnaalil"	P. Susheela		
"Ingu Paarum Inikkum Azhagai"	K. Jamuna Rani		
"Mannaa Mayangaadhe Nee"	Soolamangalam Rajalakshmi, K. Rani		
"Malarvana Veedhiyile Vasantha Thaerile"	P. Leela		03:23
"Naanum Neeyum Yaaro Evaro"	P. B. Srinivas, P. Susheela		03:34
"Usuru Namma Kaiyile"	Thiruchi Loganathan and group		
