= Indira En Selvam =

- Film poster
- Directed by: Duncan Mani and C. Padmanaban
- Written by: Viruthai Ramasamy
- Produced by: S. Soundappan; C. Chenna Kesavan
- Starring: Pandari Bai; M. R. Radha; S. A. Ashokan; Nagesh; Baby Sumangala
- Cinematography: V. G. Nair; A. Krishnan (Director of Cinematography)
- Edited by: R. V. Rajan; V. Chakrapani
- Music by: C. N. Pandurangan; H. R. Pathmanabha Sastri
- Production company: Ashoka Pictures
- Release date: 13 September 1962
- Running time: 166 minutes
- Country: India
- Language: Tamil

Indira En Selvam (transl. Indira is My Darling Child) is a 1962 Indian Tamil-language children's drama film, directed by C. Padmanaban and produced by S. Soundappan and C. Chenna Kesavan. The film's script was written by Viruthai Ramasamy, with music by C. N. Padurangan and H. R. Pathmanabha Sastri. The film stars Baby Sumangala, Pandari Bai, M. R. Radha and S. A. Ashokan, with Nagesh A. Karunanidhi, Gemini Chandra and C. Lakshmi Rajyam in supporting roles. It was released on 13 September 1962 and was an average success.

== Cast ==
Cast according to the opening credits:

Male cast

- Nadigavel M. R. Radha as Karunamurthi, Karunakaran
- S. A. Ashokan B.A. as Doctor Sekar
- A. Karunanidhi as Compounder Kailasam
- Nagesh as Rayappan
- P. C. Kittan as Post Master
- T. K. Sampangi as Homeowner
- A. P. S. Mani as Sub-Inspector

Female cast

- Pandari Bai as Sushila
- Gemini Chandra as Prabha
- Pushpamala as Malathi
- Saradambal as Kaveri Ammal
- Surya Prabha as Vasantha
- Baby Sumangala as Indira

Dance

- Lakshmirajyam

Bharatha Natyam

- Suryaprabha
- Meenakumari

== Soundtrack ==
Music was composed by C. N. Pandurangan and H. R. Pathmanabha Sastri. The comedy number "Kadhalukku Kaaleju Yenga Irukku" by S. C. Krishnan and A. G. Rathnamala attracted attention. "Inbam Kondadum Maalai", a duet by P. B. Srinivas and K. Rani, became a hit.

Songs	Singers	Lyrics	Length
"Inbam Kondadum Maalai"	P. B. Srinivas & K. Rani	Thamizhazhagan	03:42
"Kanni Paruvam Aval"	P. B. Srinivas & Soolamgalam Rajalakshmi	Villiputhan	03:26
"Aadi Aadi Enna Kandai"	A. L. Raghavan	Villiputhan	04:13
"Kadhalukku Kaaleju Yenga Irukku"	S. C. Krishnan & A. G. Rathnamala	Villiputhan	03:15
"Thithikkum Thamizhile"	Soolamangalam Rajalakshmi & Soolamangalam Jayalakshmi	Suratha	03:40
"Thella Thelintha Thaen"	(Radha) Jayalakshmi	Vaa. Su. Raa	02:39
"Ullasa Mangai Illaamal"	Soolamangalam Rajalakshmi	Kovai Kumarathevan	04:20
