= K. Jamuna Rani =

Indian singer (1930–2026)

Kalaimamani K. Jamuna Rani
- Also known as: Jamuna Rani
- Born: Kakinada Jamuna Rani; May 17, 1938; Kakinada, Andhra Pradesh, India
- Died: July 30,2026 (age 88) Bengaluru, Karnataka, India
- Genre: Playback
- Occupation: Singer
- Instrument: Vocalist
- Years active: 1944–2026

Kakinada Jamuna Rani (17 May 1938 – 30 July 2026), better known as K. Jamuna Rani was an Indian playback singer who sung over 6,000 songs in Telugu, Sinhalese, Tamil, Kannada , Hindi, and Malayalam languages.

== Life and career ==
Rani first sang in Sri Lankan cinema for Sujatha in 1953 under the direction of composer Ananda Samarakoon. She subsequently contributed to Warada Kageda (1954), Seda Sulang (1955), Mathalan (1955), Suraya (1957) and Vana Mohini (1958). 'Jeevana Mea Gamana Sansare' which she sang with A. M. Rajah for the movie 'Seda Sulang' is one of the all-time favourite Sinhala cinema songs in Sri Lanka.

Rani never married. She died on 30 July 2026, at the age of 96 or 88.

== Awards ==
- Kalaimamani award from the State Government of Tamil Nadu in 1998.
- Tamil Nadu State Film Honorary Award - Arignar Annadurai award in 2002.
- Puratchi Thalaivi Dr. J. Jayalalithaa Special Kalaimamani Award by the Government of Tamil Nadu in 2020.
