= A. M. Rajah =

Indian playback singer, composer

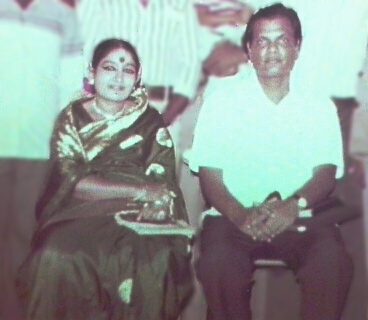
- Rajah and his wife Jikki

Background information
- Born: 1 July 1929; Chittoor, Madras Presidency, British India (now Andhra Pradesh, India)
- Died: 8 April 1989 (aged 59) Valliur, Tamil Nadu, India
- Genre: Film music
- Occupations: Playback singer, music director
- Instruments: Vocalist, pianist
- Years active: 1950s, early 1960s, early 1970s

Aemala Manmadharaju Rajah, popularly known as A. M. Rajah (1929–1989), was an Indian playback singer and music director.

== Early life ==
A. M. Rajah was born on 1 July 1929 in Ramapuram village, Chittoor District, Andhra Pradesh. His father died when he was three months old and the family moved to Renukapuram then. He graduated Pachaiyappa's College with a Bachelor of Arts.

=== Early career ===
Whilst attending university, Rajah wrote, composed, and sang two songs in Telugu with the instrumental support of the music director K. V. Mahadevan for His Master's Voice. These songs were broadcast by All India Radio whereupon they caught the attention of S. S. Vasan. After listening to these songs, Vasan, with the approval of his music directors Emani Sankara Sastry, and Kalki Krishnamurthy, booked Rajah for his upcoming film, Samsaram. By this time Rajah was also recording songs for the films Rajambal and Kumaari (for M. G. Ramachandran).

His first Telugu film was Adarsham (1952). He also acted and sang in Pakkinti Ammayi (1953). His first song in Malayalam was for Lokaneethi (1952).

In 1953, Rajah and Jikki were chosen by Shankar Jaikishan and Raj Kapoor for the multilingual film Aah.

Rajah also sang in a few Sinhala films produced in Chennai and Sri Lanka with Jikki and K. Jamuna Rani.

Rajah's exit from the film world was controversial. He fell out with a number of music composers and developed a reputation for being difficult to work with. He was direct and had strong opinions on how songs must be composed and sung. Mahadevan was the first to openly drop him after recording the song "Kayile Inippathenna, Kaniyanal Kasappathenna", which was followed by a heated argument on the set of Manamulla Maru Tharam (1958). It was also known in the cinema circles that M. S. Viswanathan always resisted using Rajah in his films after their collaboration in Genoa. Film critics noted that he was his own worst enemy.

However, he continued to sing for Malayalam films longer where particularly G. Devarajan was able to coax Rajah to sing from time to time. Rajah however continued to reside in Chennai. It is noteworthy that G. Devarajan mentioned in his book that not only Rajah was an excellent melodious singer, but also of a straightforward character often misunderstood. Most composers called him an arrogant cynic.

Rajah made a comeback in the 1970s through composers V. Kumar and Shankar–Ganesh, and the songs were amongst the hits of the respective years.

=== Music composer ===
Rajah was booked early in his cinema life as one of the music composers, but he passed the opportunity to Viswanathan.

Rajah's debut as music composer was for Sobha (1958). It was C. V. Sridhar who gave his friend the second break to be a music director, fulfilling his promise that the day he directed his first film, Rajah would be its music director. The film was Kalyana Parisu (1959). Rajah received the Madras Film Fans Association award of Best Music Director in 1959 for this film. In the same year he composed music for Anbukkor Anni (1958). Sridhar and Rajah thereafter collaborated on Vidivelli (1960) and Then Nilavu (1961). They separated after the film was completed and Rajah refused to do the background music, but eventually did under pressure from mutual friends; Sridhar wanted to go back to Rajah for Nenjil Or Alayam (1962), but he refused. He then composed music for Aadi Perukku (1962).

In the 1970s, he composed music for films Amma Enna Stree(Malayalam-1970), Veetu Mapillai (Tamil-1973) and Enakkoru Magan Pirappan (Tamil-1975).

== Death ==
On the 8th of April, 1989, Rajah was killed in a train accident at Valliyur in Tirunelveli district. In transit to perform at a concert in Kanyakumari district temple, Rajah reportedly attempted to board a moving train, whereupon he tripped and fell onto the tracks. He was killed instantly. His body buried in the cemetery, placed in his land in Renukapuram.

== Discography ==
Song	Film	Year	Music	Lyrics	Co-singer	Actor	Language
Aadatha Manamum Aduthe	Kalathur Kannamma	1960	R. Sudarsanam	Ku. Ma. Balasubramaniam	P. Susheela	Gemini Ganesan	Tamil
Aadavargale Naattile	Anbu	1953	T. R. Pappa	Suratha	M. L. Vasanthakumari	Sivaji Ganesan	Tamil
Aade Paade Pasivada	Pelli Kanuka	1960	A. M. Rajah	Samudrala Sr.		A. Nageswara Rao	Telugu
Aadhavan Ezhundhaan	Vipra Narayana	1955	S. Rajeswara Rao	S. D. Sundharam		A. Nageswara Rao	Tamil
Aadhavanai Polave Dhinamum	En Magal	1954	C. N. Pandurangan	Pavalar Velayuthasami	A. P. Komala	Ranjan	Tamil
Aaduvari Maatalu	Inti Guttu	1958	M. S. Prakash	Malladi Ramakrishna Sastry		N. T. Rama Rao	Telugu
Aaha Bhale Chirugali	Sankranti	1952	G. Aswathama	Balijepalli Lakshmikanta Kavi		K. Siva Rao	Telugu
Ahaa Kalai Thenoorum Kanni Thamizh	Illara Jothi	1954	G. Ramanathan	Kannadasan	P. Leela	Gemini Ganesan	Tamil
Aalisade Dayathorisade	Sodari	1955	S. R. Padmanabha Sastry & G. K. Venkatesh	Hunsur Krishnamurthy	P. Leela	Rajkumar	Kannada
Aamalarkkaavil	Achanum Makanum	1956	Vimal Kumar	Thirunalloor Karunakaran	K. Rani		Malayalam
Aanazhagey Van Amuthey	Yar Manamagan?	1961	Br Lakshmanan	Ku. Ma. Balasubramaniam	P. Leela		Tamil
Aanandha Illam	Ithu Ivarkalin Kathai	1976	V. Kumar		P. Susheela		Tamil
Aanandham Paramanandham	Kadan Vaangi Kalyaanam	1958	S. Rajeswara Rao	Thanjai N. Ramaiah Dass	P. Leela	Gemini Ganesan	Tamil
Aanandham Paramanandham	Appu Chesi Pappu Koodu	1959	S. Rajeswara Rao	Pingali Nagendrarao	P. Leela	Jaggayya	Telugu
Aanandha Valli Nee	Aathmaarpanam	1956	V. Dakshinamoorthy	Abhayadev	P. Leela	Prem Nazir	Malayalam
Aaru Neeyen	Umma	1960	M. S. Baburaj	P. Bhaskaran		Sathyan	Malayalam
Aaru Neeyen Maariville	Unniyaarcha	1962	K. Raghavan	P. Bhaskaran		Prem Nazir	Malayalam
Aasai Nenjame	Bhoologa Rambai	1958	C. N. Pandurangan	Kovi. Manisekaran	Radha Jayalakshmi	Gemini Ganesan	Tamil
Aasai Pongum Azhagu Rubam	Aasai	1956	T. R. Pappa		Jikki	Gemini Ganesan	Tamil
Aasai Raajaa... Neela Nilavinile	Therotti Magan-Stage Play by S. V. Sahasranamam	1959	M. K. Athmanathan	M. K. Athmanathan	T. S. Bagavathi		Tamil
Aasaiye Alai Mothuthe	Genova	1953	T. A. Kalyanam, M. S. Gnanamani & M. S. Viswanathan		P. Leela	M. G. Ramachandran	Tamil
Aasaiyinale Manam	Kalyana Parisu	1959	A. M. Rajah	Pattukkottai Kalyanasundaram	P. Susheela	Gemini Ganesan	Tamil
Aasa Kaivediyathe	Avan Varunnu	1954	V. Dakshinamoorthy	Abhayadev			Malayalam
Aasinchi Maname Aadene	Mavoori Ammayi	1960	R. Sudarsanam	Anisetti	P. Susheela	Gemini Ganesan	Telugu
Abhimaanam Vediyathe	Kidappadam	1955	V. Dakshinamoorthy	Abhayadev			Malayalam
Adhairiyam Kolvadhu Ariveenam .. Prakaasam Poley	Kumaari	1952	K. V. Mahadevan	M. P. Sivam	P. Leela	M. G. Ramachandran	Tamil
Adi Kamachchiye Enthan Kanne	Samsaram	1951	Emani Sankara Sastry	Kothamangalam Subbu	Jikki		Tamil
Aduvari Matalaku Ardhale Verule	Missamma	1955	S. Rajeswara Rao	Pingali Nagendrarao		N. T. Rama Rao	Telugu
Aiyaa Mudhalaali Vaanga	Anbu	1953	T. R. Pappa	Ka. Mu. Sheriff		Sivaji Ganesan	Tamil
Akasa Gangayude	Omanakuttan	1964	G. Devarajan	Vayalar Ramavarma			Malayalam
Akkanum	Aayisha	1964	R. K. Shekhar	Vayalar Ramavarma	P. Susheela		Malayalam
Akkarakkundo	Inapraavugal	1965	V. Dakshinamoorthy	Vayalar Ramavarma			Malayalam
Allavin Namatthai Solla Solla	Menaka	1955	C. N. Pandurangan & Vedha				Tamil
Amara Premadamilana	Shukradese	1957	T. A. Kalyanam	Balakrishna	Udutha Sarojini		Kannada
Ambadi Thannilorunni	Krishna Kuchela	1961	K. Raghavan	P. Bhaskaran			Malayalam
Ambalai Nee Jannal Kitte	Nalla Pillai	1953	Vedha		P. Leela	Bhagwan	Tamil
Ambuli Mama Shokku Parka	Kudumbam	1954	Pendyala Nageswara Rao	M. S. Subramaniam	Jikki	Sriram	Tamil
Amdala Rani	Veera Kankanam	1957	S. Dakshinamurthi	Aarudhra	R. Balasaraswathi Devi	N. T. Rama Rao	Telugu
Amdala Konetilona	Allauddin Adhbhuta Deepam	1957	S. Rajeswara Rao & S. Hanumantha Rao	Aarudhra	P. Susheela	A. Nageswara Rao	Telugu
Ammanu Minchina Unnatha	Beedhala Aasthi	1955	Master Venu	Sri Sri		Jaggayya	Telugu
Ammavendru Azhuthalume							Tamil
Anbe Nee Ange	Bommai Kalyanam	1958	K. V. Mahadevan	A. Maruthakasi	Jikki	Sivaji Ganesan	Tamil
Anbe Nee Kanne Valarnthaal Petra	Nalla Penmani	1954	P. S. Divakar	A. S. Rajagopal	R. Balasaraswathi Devi	Thikkurissy Sukumaran Nair	Tamil
Andhalalone	Renuka Devi Mahathyam	1960	L. Malleswara Rao		Jikki		Telugu
Andhari Anandhala Andhala	Sadarama	1956	R. Sudarsanam & R. Govardhanam	G. Krishna Murthy	P. Susheela		Telugu
Anaiya Jothi	Solaimalai Rani	1960	C. N. Pandurangan		Radha Jayalakshmi		Tamil
Anandamanta Nee Rayamenani	Sobha	1958	A. M. Rajah	P. Vasanth Kumar Reddy	Jikki	N. T. Rama Rao	Telugu
Anathai Polavey Aaneney	Genova	1953	T. A. Kalyanam, M. S. Gnanamani & M. S. Viswanathan			M. G. Ramachandran	Tamil
Anathi Kavalena	Amara Sandhesam	1954	K. Vara Prasada Rao	Sri Sri		N. T. Rama Rao	Telugu
Anbana Mozhi Pesum Vanamohini	Solaimalai Rani	1960	C. N. Pandurangan		Radha Jayalakshmi		Tamil
Anbe Enthan Munnale	Aaravalli	1957	G. Ramanathan	Kannadasan	Jikki	S. G. Eshwar	Tamil
Anbe Vaa	Avan	1953	Shankar Jaikishan	Kambadasan	Jikki	Raj Kapoor	Tamil
Anbirukkuthu Arivirukkuthu	Marma Veeran	1956	Vedha	Pattukottai Kalyanasundaram	T. A. Mothi & S. C. Krishnan	Sriram	Tamil
Anputhan Ponnambalathil	Avan Varunnu	1954	V. Dakshinamoorthy	Abhayadev	Kaviyoor Revamma		Malayalam
Andaala Sandadilo Puvu	Vijaya Gauri	1955	G. Ramanathan & Viswanathan–Ramamoorthy	Samudrala Jr.	M. L. Vasanthakumari	N. T. Rama Rao	Telugu
Andhaalu Chiddu Seemalo	Raja Nandini	1958	T. V. Raju	Malladi Ramakrishna Sastry	Jikki	N. T. Rama Rao	Telugu
Andhaalu Chindeti Anandhaseema	Chintamani	1956	Adeppalli Rama Rao & T. V. Raju	Ravuri Rangiah	P. Bhanumathi	N. T. Rama Rao	Telugu
Andalachandamama Mudamaye	Mugguru Veerulu	1960	T. R. Pappa	Muddu Krishna	Jikki	C. L. Anandan	Telugu
Andhala Chinduthara	Sobha	1958	A. M. Rajah	P. Vasanth Kumar Reddy	Jikki	N. T. Rama Rao	Telugu
Andhala Seemalo	Sobha	1958	A. M. Rajah	P. Vasanth Kumar Reddy	Jikki	N. T. Rama Rao	Telugu
Andhamkore Moham Needhe	Virisina Vennela	1961	A. M. Rajah	Anisetti Subba Rao	S. Janaki	Gemini Ganesan	Telugu
Andhanaani Phalama Naa Anuragamu	Sankranti	1952	G. Aswathama	Balijepalli Lakshmikanta Kavi	P. Leela	K. Siva Rao	Telugu
Anganeyangane	Aayisha	1964	R. K. Shekhar	Vayalar Ramavarma	P. Susheela		Malayalam
Angadiee Thottu Madangiya	Koodappirappu	1956	K. Raghavan	Vayalar Ramavarma	Santha P. Nair		Malayalam
Annaiyai Pole Munnari Dheivam	Ezhayin Aasthi	1955	T. A. Kalyanam & G. Natarajan	Guhan		Jaggayya	Tamil
Annu Ninne Kandathil Pinne	Unniyaarcha	1962	K. Raghavan	P. Bhaskaran	P. Susheela	Prem Nazir	Malayalam
Anputhan Ponnampalathil	Avarunarunnu	1956	V. Dakshinamoorthy	Vayalar Ramavarma	Jikki	Prem Nazir	Malayalam
Antho Niyayam Itha	Genova	1953	T. A. Kalyanam, M. S. Gnanamani & M. S. Viswanathan			M. G. Ramachandran	Tamil
Anuraghalu Duramulayane	Vipra Narayana	1954	S. Rajeswara Rao	Samudrala Sr.	P. Bhanumathi	A. Nageswara Rao	Telugu
Antu Mamidi Thotalone	Akka Chellelu	1957	Pendyala Nageswara Rao		Jikki	Amarnath	Telugu
Anyara Kayade	Ajnathi	1954			C. S. Sarojini Devi		Telugu
Appaavoda Chellamaa	Punithavathi	1963	Hussein Reddy	Kanaga Surabhi	Jikki		Tamil
Aram Katha Dheviye	Maheswari	1955	G. Ramanathan	Pattukkottai Kalyanasundaram	Jikki	N. S. Narayana Pillai	Tamil
Ariyathe Kinakkalail	Lokaneethi	1952	V. Dakshinamoorthy	Abhayadev	Kaviyoor Revamma		Malayalam
Arugil Vandhaal	Kalathur Kannamma	1960	R. Sudarsanam	Kannadasan		Gemini Ganesan	Tamil
Athade Kartha Athade Bhartha	Mahalakshmi Mahima	1959	S. N. Tripati & T.M. Ibrahim	Sri Sri			Telugu
Athi Madhuraa Anuraaga	School Master	1958	T. G. Lingappa		K. Jamuna Rani		Kannada
Athi Madhuraa Anuraaga	Engal Kudumbam Perisu	1958	T. G. Lingappa	K. D. Santhanam	K. Jamuna Rani		Tamil
Athisayamana Ragasiyam Onnu	Maaman Magal	1955	S. V. Venkatraman			Gemini Ganesan	Tamil
Attin Manappurathe	Kanmanikal	1966	G. Devarajan	Vayalar Ramavarma	S. Janaki		Malayalam
Avan Varunnu	Avan Varunnu	1954	V. Dakshinamoorthy	Abhayadev	L. P. R. Varma		Malayalam
Azhagu Nilavin Bavaniyile	Maheswari	1955	G. Ramanathan	Pattukkottai Kalyanasundaram	Jikki	Gemini Ganesan	Tamil
Azhiyatha Kaadhal Vazhvin	Kumaari	1952	K. V. Mahadevan	Ku. Sa. Krishnamurthy		M. G. Ramachandran	Tamil
Bare Sundari	Rayara Sose	1957	R. Diwakara	Gundu Rao			Kannada
Bhagavan Bhagavan Yela	Mahalakshmi Mahima	1959	S. N. Tripati & T.M. Ibrahim	Sri Sri	P. Leela		Telugu
Bharatham Maha Bharatham	Bheema Prathigna	1965	G. Devarajan	Anisetti	B. Vasantha	Dara Singh	Telugu
Bhoomiyil Ninnu Mulachundayo	Unniyaarcha	1962	K. Raghavan	P. Bhaskaran		Prem Nazir	Malayalam
Bhujamupaina Shiluva Mosi	Yesu Prabhuvu	1973	V. Kumar	Rajasri			Telugu
Branthavanamum Nanthakumaranum	Missiamma	1955	S. Rajeswara Rao	Thanjai N. Ramaiah Dass	P. Susheela	Gemini Ganesan	Tamil
Brindavanamadi Andaridi Govindudandari Vade	Missamma	1955	S. Rajeswara Rao	Pingali Nagendrarao	P. Susheela	N. T. Rama Rao	Telugu
Chadavali	Vaddante Dabbu	1954	T. A. Kalyanam	Veturi	P. Susheela	N. T. Rama Rao	Telugu
Chakkanaina Janta Idhe	Jebu Donga	1961	T. M. Ibrahim	Anisetti	Jikki	M. G. Ramachandran	Telugu
Challaga Vachchi Mellaga Pothavule	Anaganaga Oka Raju	1959	T. M. Ibrahim	Sri Sri	P. Susheela	M. G. Ramachandran	Telugu
Chandamama Soku Choodaa	Menarikam	1954	Pendyala Nageswara Rao		Jikki	Sriram	Telugu
Chandana Pallakkil	Palattu Koman	1962	M. S. Baburaj	Vayalar Ramavarma	P. Susheela		Malayalam
Chandrakalavai Ragadhe Nedu	Manasichina Maguva	1960	S. M. Subbaiah Naidu	Sri Sri		Gemini Ganesan	Telugu
Chandrikayilaliyunnu	Bharyamar Sookshikkuka	1968	V. Dakshinamoorthy	Sreekumaran Thampi			Malayalam
Cheluva Hennige Guna Sampannege	Shukradese	1957	T. A. Kalyanam	Balakrishna		Balakrishna	Kannada
Chemma Chekka Ladadam	Sri Kalahastiswara Mahatyam	1954	R. Sudarsanam & R. Govardhanam	Toleti Venkat Reddy	P. Susheela	Gopi Krishna	Telugu
Chencheetanayya	Penki Pellam	1956	K. Prasada Rao	Aarudhra	Jikki	N. T. Rama Rao	Telugu
Cheyi Cheyi kaluparve	Appu Chesi Pappu Koodu	1959	S. Rajeswara Rao	Pingali Nagendrarao	P. Leela	Jaggayya	Telugu
Chinanchiru Paingkiliye Nee	Thanthai	1953	P. S. Divakar	Kambadasan		Thikkurissy Sukumaran Nair	Tamil
Chinna Chinna Kannile	Then Nilavu	1961	A. M. Rajah	Kannadasan	P. Susheela	Gemini Ganesan	Tamil
Chinna Chinna Veedu Katti	Marumagal	1953	C. R. Subburaman & G. Ramanathan	Udumalai Narayana Kavi	P. A. Periyanayaki	N. T. Rama Rao	Tamil
Chinna Kannanne Naan Thanthaiyena	Thaikku Oru Pillai	1972	Shankar–Ganesh	Pulamaipithan		A. V. M. Rajan	Tamil
Chinna Pennana Pothile	Aaravalli	1957	G. Ramanathan	Pattukkottai Kalyanasundaram	Jikki	S. G. Eshwar	Tamil
Chinnari Choopulaku	Appu Chesi Pappu Koodu	1959	S. Rajeswara Rao	Pingali Nagendrarao	P. Leela & Ghantasala	K Jaggayya	Telugu
Chirakattuveenoru	Pazhassi Raja	1964	R. K. Shekhar	Vayalar Ramavarma	S. Janaki		Malayalam
Chittamidhemo Cheliyane	Manasichina Maguva	1960	S. M. Subbaiah Naidu	Sri Sri		Gemini Ganesan	Telugu
Chorayillayo Kanil	Kidappadam	1955	V. Dakshinamoorthy	Abhayadev			Malayalam
Chudumade Cheliya	Vipra Narayana	1954	S. Rajeswara Rao	Samudrala Sr.		A. Nageswara Rao	Telugu
Chuthi Chuthi Machchane	Veera Amar Singh	1959	T. G. Lingappa	Kuyilan	Jikki		Tamil
Daivam Nyaayamunelune Ilaa	Uttama Illalu	1958	G. Ramanathan & M. Subrahmanya Raju	Sri Sri	Madhavapeddi Satyam	Gemini Ganesan	Telugu
Dari Cheruchukhora Ranga	Vipra Narayana	1954	S. Rajeswara Rao	Samudrala Sr.		A. Nageswara Rao	Telugu
Dayamaayi Saaradhaa Mamu	Amara Sandhesam	1954	K. Vara Prasada Rao	Sri Sri			Telugu
Deivatthin	Neeli Saali	1960	K. Raghavan	P. Bhaskaran			Malayalam
Desham Gnanam Chaduvu	Parasakthi	1957	R. Sudarsanam	Samudrala Sr.		Sivaji Ganesan	Telugu
Devatharu Pootha Naalu	Manavatty	1964	G. Devarajan	Vayalar Ramavarma			Malayalam
Dhaam Dhoom Thagatham	Avan Amaran	1958	T. M. Ibrahim	Kanaga Surabhi	A. P. Komala		Tamil
Dhaari Thennu	Bratuku Teruvu	1953	Ghantasala	Samudrala Sr.	Solo	Sriranjani	Telugu
Dhaatrijanulaku Dharmamaargamu	Bheema Prathigna	1965	G. Devarajan	Anisetti	B. Vasantha	Dara Singh	Telugu
Dheerasameere Yamunaa	Bangaru Papa	1955	Addepalli Rama Rao	Devulapalli Krishnasastri	P. Susheela	Jaggayya	Telugu
Doova Neenaade	Bhookailasa	1958	R. Sudarsanam & R. Govardhanam		P. Susheela		Kannada
Duraiye Ilamai	Kathanayaki	1955	G. Ramanathan	A. Maruthakasi	K. Jamuna Rani	T. R. Ramachandran	Tamil
Edaa Neevunnaavu Emayinaavuraa	Thandri	1953	P. S. Divakar		Kaviyoor Revamma		Telugu
Edhai Ketpadho	Pathu Madha Bandham	1974	Shankar–Ganesh		Jikki	A. V. M. Rajan	Tamil
Eelikatho Idhivarake	Manasichina Maguva	1960	S. M. Subbaiah Naidu	Sri Sri		Gemini Ganesan	Telugu
Ee Poole Maimaraginche	Veera Ghatothkacha	1959	Vijaya Bhaskar & Chitragupta	Sri Sri	P. Susheela		Telugu
Ekantha Kamuka	Daaham	1965	G. Devarajan	Vayalar Ramavarma	P. Susheela		Malayalam
Elane Intavesham Idiyela Vintamoham	Anumanam Penubhutham	1967	K. V. Mahadevan & Suryam	Anisetti	P. Susheela	Sivaji Ganesan	Telugu
Ellam Unakke Tharuvene	Missiamma	1955	S. Rajeswara Rao	Thanjai N. Ramaiah Dass		Gemini Ganesan	Tamil
Elli Neenuruve	Bhakta Vijaya	1955	Shyam-Aathmanath	Anand		Rajkumar	Kannada
Emta Durami Payanam	For His Master's Voice	1950	A. M. Rajah	A. M. Rajah			Telugu
En Avalthan Poiyaai Ponadho	Manoratham	1955	M. Venkataraju		Jikki	Kalyan Kumar	Tamil
Enduko Ee Laanti Jeevithamu	Aakali	1952	P. S. Divakar	Devulapalli Krishnasastri	Jikki	Prem Nazir	Telugu
En Makane	Achan	1952	P. S. Divakar	Abhayadev			Malayalam
Ennamellam Eedera ... Ellorume Kaana Kalyaname	Puthumai Penn	1959	T. G. Lingappa	Pattukottai Kalyanasundaram	Jikki	R. S. Manohar	Tamil
Enna Sukka	Veera Jabak	1964	Vijaya Bhaskar		P. Susheela		Kannada
Enthan Kannil Kalandhu	Mallika	1957	T. R. Pappa	A. Maruthakasi	P. Susheela	Gemini Ganesan	Tamil
Enge Selvayo	Ratha Paasam	1954	M. K. Athmanathan & A. V. Natarajan		S. J. Kantha	T. K. Shanmugam	Tamil
Engirunthu Veesutho	Kadan Vaangi Kalyaanam	1958	S. Rajeswara Rao	Thanjai N. Ramaiah Dass	P. Leela	Gemini Ganesan	Tamil
En Kanninte Kadaviladuthal	Umma	1960	M. S. Baburaj	P. Bhaskaran	P. Leela	K. P. Ummer	Malayalam
En Kathal Inbam Ithuthana	Thaaikkuppin Thaaram	1956	K. V. Mahadevan	A. Maruthakasi	P. Bhanumathi	M. G. Ramachandran	Tamil
Enada Kanna	Anbu Roja	1975	Shankar–Ganesh		P. Susheela	R. Muthuraman	Tamil
Enna Enna Inbame Vaazvile Ennaazhum	Anbu	1953	T. R. Pappa	Ka. Mu. Sheriff	Jikki	Sivaji Ganesan	Tamil
Ennasai Ratha Nee	Nalla Pillai	1953	Vedha		P. Leela	Bhagwan	Tamil
Enu Ninnadu Embudilli	Bhakta Vijaya	1955	Shyam-Aathmanath	Anand		Rajkumar	Kannada
En Nenjin Premai Geetham	Panam Paduthum Padu	1954	T. A. Kalyanam	Vindhan	P. Susheela	N. T. Rama Rao	Tamil
Ennini Njan Nedum	Kidappadam	1955	V. Dakshinamoorthy	Abhayadev	Kaviyoor Revamma		Malayalam
Ennum Pothile	Inspector	1953	G. Ramanathan		Jikki	Sriram	Tamil
Enthan Kanniladum	Bhoologa Rambai	1958	C. N. Pandurangan	Villiputhan	P. Susheela	Gemini Ganesan	Tamil
En Thevane Unnidam Ondru Ketpen	Ithu Ivarkalin Kathai	1976	V. Kumar				Tamil
En Ullam Un Sondhame	Veettukku Vandha Varalakshmi	1957	Pendyala Nageswara Rao	Poongkuyilan		N. T. Rama Rao	Tamil
Eru Navvindoyi.... Ooru Navvindoyi	Palle Paduchu	1954	M. S. Rama Rao	Aarudhra			Telugu
Etula Meppinnchedo Nannu	Amara Sandhesam	1954	K. Vara Prasada Rao	Sri Sri			Telugu
Ethukku Azhaithai Ethukku	Petrathai	1953	Pendyala Nageswara Rao	M. S. Subramaniam	P. Susheela	A. Nageswara Rao	Tamil
Evaraa Drohi Idhi Kutra	Anumanam Penubhutham	1967	K. V. Mahadevan & Suryam	Anisetti		Sivaji Ganesan	Telugu
E Viparitamainaa Thanakem	Gnaneshwar	1963	Veluri Krishnamurthy	Malladi Ramakrishna Sastry			Telugu
Ezhil Jothi Vanava	Ezhayin Aasthi	1955	T. A. Kalyanam & G. Natarajan	Guhan	Rohini	Jaggayya	Tamil
Ezhil Oviyam Paarththeno	Veera Gadothgajan	1959	Vijaya Bhaskar		P. Susheela		Tamil
Ezhil Pongume Parthale	Veera Gadothgajan	1959	Vijaya Bhaskar		P. Susheela		Tamil
Footpath Vasi	Bhaagyachakra	1956	Vijaya Bhaskar	Geethapriya		Kalyan Kumar	Kannada
Gana Gana Gana Gana	Pakka Inti Ammayi	1953	G. Aswathama	Muddu Krishna	M. V. Raju	A. M. Rajah	Telugu
Ghatu Ghatu Prema	Attagaru Kothakodalu	1968	G. K. Venkatesh	Aarudhra	L. R. Eswari	Krishna	Telugu
Geyak Gaane	Dosthara	1956	R. Sudarsanam				Sinhala
Haayi Kada Mana Ilvanamu	Na Chellelu	1953	C. N. Pandurangan	Malladi Ramakrishna Sastry	R. Balasaraswathi Devi	Amaranadh	Telugu
Haayiga Theeyagaa	Bommala Pelli	1958	K. V. Mahadevan	Acharya Aatreya	Jikki	Sivaji Ganesan	Telugu
Hadey Hee Maa	Varada Kageda?	1954	S. Dakshinamurthi		S. J. Kantha		Sinhala
Haigada Mudamayegada	Melukolupu	1956	Pendyala Nageswara Rao		Jikki	Sriram	Telugu
Hare Muraare	Aathmaarpanam	1956	V. Dakshinamoorthy	Abhayadev	Jikki	Prem Nazir	Malayalam
Hasana Hasana O Deva	Yesu Prabhuvu	1973	V. Kumar	Rajasri	K. Swarna		Telugu
He Devi Jaya Jaya	Renuka Mahatme	1956	H. R. Padmanabha Sashtri				Kannada
Hrudayala Muripinchu	Sthree Hrudayam	1961	Nityanand	Anisetti Subba Rao	Jikki	Gemini Ganesan	Telugu
Hrudayamme Nadu Nide	Arabhi Veerudu Jabak	1961	Vijaya Bhaskar & Chitragupta	Sri Sri	P. Susheela	Mahipal	Telugu
Hrudayamu Voogisalaadi	Paropakaram	1953	Ghantasala	Aarudhra	Ghantasala, P. Leela & A. P. Komala		Telugu
Idai Kai Irandil Aadum	Vidivelli	1960	A. M. Rajah	Kannadasan	P. Susheela	Sivaji Ganesan	Tamil
Ide Ide Haayi Ide Tholireyi	Kanna Koduku	1961	S. P. Kodandapani	Aarudhra	K. Rani	Jaggayya	Telugu
Ide Ide Saradu	Kanna Talli	1953	Pendyala Nageswara Rao	Sri Sri & Aarudhra	K. Rani	A. Nageswara Rao	Telugu
Idigo Svarga Dvaram Tericharu Evaro	Aakali	1952	P. S. Divakar	Devulapalli Krishnasastri	Jikki & P. Leela	Prem Nazir	Telugu
Idiyenaa Kalikaalapu Dharmam	Na Chellelu	1953	C. N. Pandurangan				Telugu
Iha Jeevanasobhanu	Parasakthi	1957	R. Sudarsanam	Samudrala Sr.	T. S. Bagavathi		Telugu
Ilavenil Chandrika	Thanthai	1953	P. S. Divakar	Kambadasan	P. Leela	Thikkurissy Sukumaran Nair	Tamil
Inai Illaadha Suga Vaazhvil	C.I.D.	1955	Br Lakshmanan	K. Devanarayanan	P. Leela, V. N. Sundaram & C. S. Sarojini		Tamil
Inba Kuyil	Manidhanum Mirugamum	1953	G. Govindarajulu Naidu	S. D. Sundharam	M. L. Vasanthakumari	Sivaji Ganesan	Tamil
Inbame Pongume	Bommai Kalyanam	1958	K. V. Mahadevan	A. Maruthakasi	Jikki	Sivaji Ganesan	Tamil
Inbamo Thunbamo Edhuvume Nillaadhe	Gumastha	1953	G. Ramanathan, V. Nagayya & C. N. Pandurangan	A. Maruthakasi		A. Nageswara Rao	Tamil
Ini Ahatha soham	Vipra Narayana	1955	S. Rajeswara Rao	S. D. Sundharam	P. Bhanumathi	A. Nageswara Rao	Tamil
Intha Desham Intha Soukhyam	Pempudu Koduku	1953	S. Rajeswara Rao	Sri Sri	Jikki	Sivaji Ganesan	Telugu
Inthena Brathukantha Inthena	Rajee Na Pranam	1954	S. Hanumantha Rao	Devulapalli Krishnasastri			Telugu
Iruilile Nilavoli Pol	Kumaari	1952	K. V. Mahadevan	M. P. Sivam	Jikki	M. G. Ramachandran	Tamil
Isai Paadi naanum	Ulagam	1953	M. S. Gnanamani		P. Leela		Tamil
Isai Paadum Thendralodu	Vijayapuri Veeran	1960	T. R. Pappa		Jikki	C. L. Anandan	Tamil
Ithaya Vanin Uthaya Nilave	Parthiban Kanavu	1960	Vedha	Vindhan	P. Susheela	Gemini Ganesan	Tamil
Ithayam Ennum Kovil Thannil	Pona Machaan Thirumbi Vandhan	1954	C. N. Pandurangan & M. S. Viswanathan	V. Seetharaman	U. R. Jeevarathinam	Sriram	Tamil
Paadhakam Seivadhum...Udan Pirandhavan	Ratha Paasam	1954	M. K. Athmanathan & A. V. Natarajan	M. K. Athmanathan		T. K. Shanmugam	Tamil
Jaaliyaaga Yaavum	Circus Sundari	1958	M. Ranga Rao		Jikki		Tamil
Jaami Chettu Meeda Nunna	M.L.A.	1957	Pendyala Nageswara Rao	Aarudhra	Jikki	Jaggayya	Telugu
Jagadeeshwara Leelakal	Snehaseema	1954	V. Dakshinamoorthy	Abhayadev	P. Leela		Malayalam
Jagalelu Devara	Beedhala Aasthi	1955	Master Venu	Sri Sri	Rohini	Jaggayya	Telugu
Jagame Sukha Samyogama	Vadina	1955	R. Sudarsanam & G. Aswathama	Toleti Venkata Reddy		A. Nageswara Rao	Telugu
Jagamuna Dhaname Saadhanamu	Mugguru Kodukulu	1952	P. S. Anantharaman & M. D. Parthasarathy				Telugu
Jagannatha Swamy	Sri Jagannatha Mahatyamu	1955	Mallik	Srivatsava	B. Gopalam, Mallik, Venkatraju, Krishna Kumar, V. Lakshmi, Padma Priya & Renuka Sr.		Telugu
Janani Paavani.... Lokaalele Dhevi	Amara Sandhesam	1954	K. Vara Prasada Rao	Sri Sri			Telugu
Jayabheri	Unniyaarcha	1962	K. Raghavan	P. Bhaskaran	P. B. Sreenivas		Malayalam
Jaya Jaya Nandha Kasoraa	Amara Sandhesam	1954	K. Vara Prasada Rao	Sri Sri			Telugu
Jeevana Mea Gamana Sansare	Seda Sulang	1955	S. Dakshinamurthi, Ananda Samarakoon	D. T. Fernando	K. Jamuna Rani	Prem Jayanth	Sinhalese
Jojojo Jojojo Laali	Vadina	1955	R. Sudarsanam & G. Aswathama	Toleti Venkata Reddy	Madhavapeddi Satyam & P. Susheela	A. Nageswara Rao	Telugu
Kaa Kaa Kaa Thindhamu Buvva	Parasakthi	1957	R. Sudarsanam	Samudrala Sr.		Sivaji Ganesan	Telugu
Kaadhale Uyiraagi	Raja Rani	1956	T. R. Pappa			Sivaji Ganesan	Tamil
Kaadhalile Tholviyutraan Kaalai Oruvan	Kalyana Parisu	1959	A. M. Rajah	Pattukkottai Kalyanasundaram	P. Susheela	Gemini Ganesan	Tamil
Kadhalin Cholai Kaniyai	Kumaari	1952	K. V. Mahadevan			M. G. Ramachandran	Tamil
Kaadhalenum Amara Jothi	Yar Manamagan?	1961	Br Lakshmanan	Ku. Ma. Balasubramaniam	P. Leela		Tamil
Kaalamenbadhu Anuhoolamaahil	Moondru Pillaigal	1952	P. S. Anantharaman & M. D. Parthasarathy	Kothamangalam Subbu			Tamil
Kaalam Sharathkaalam	Vivahasammanam	1971	G. Devarajan	Vayalar Ramavarma		Prem Nazir	Malayalam
Kaalayum Neeye Maalayum Neeye	Then Nilavu	1961	A. M. Rajah	Kannadasan	S. Janaki	Gemini Ganesan	Tamil
Kaanaan Pattaatha	Kuppivala	1965	M. S. Baburaj	P. Bhaskaran		Prem Nazir	Malayalam
Kaanatha Sorgam Ondru	Naan Sollum Ragasiyam	1959	G. Ramanathan	A. Maruthakasi	P. Susheela		Tamil
Kaanatha Sorgam Ondru	Penn Manam	1963	Vedha		P. Susheela		Tamil
Kaatariyilla Kadalariyilla	Jail	1966	G. Devarajan	Vayalar Ramavarma			Malayalam
Kaathal Illaathu Anandhm Ethu	Naaga Nandhini	1961	R. Sudarsanam	M. K. Athmanathan	K. Jamuna Rani	K. Balaji	Tamil
Kaathal Vaazvil Naane	Edhir Paradhathu	1954	C. N. Pandurangan	K. S. Gopalakrishnan	Jikki	Sivaji Ganesan	Tamil
Kaathalil Vignaanam	Mappillai	1952	T. R. Pappa & N. S. Balakrishnan	Thanjai N. Ramaiah Dass	P. Leela	P. V. Narasimha Bharathi	Tamil
Kaattuchembakam	Velutha Kathreena	1968	G. Devarajan	Sreekumaran Thampi			Malayalam
Kaavaalante Isthaale	Missamma	1955	S. Rajeswara Rao	Pingali Nagendrarao		N. T. Rama Rao	Telugu
Kaavi Kattave Vazhithanai Kaattum	Ellam Inba Mayam	1955	Ghantasala	Thanjai N. Ramaiah Dass		T. R. Ramachandran	Tamil
Kaayile Inippadhenna	Manamulla Maruthaaram	1958	K. V. Mahadevan	A. Maruthakasi	Jikki	K. Balaji	Tamil
Kada Kada Loda Loda Vandi	Samsaram	1951	Emani Sankara Sastry	Kothamangalam Subbu	Jikki	Sriram	Tamil
Kadankadha Parayunna	Veettumrugam	1969	G. Devarajan	P. Bhaskaran	B. Vasantha	Sathyan	Malayalam
Kadhaparayamo	Chathurangam	1959	G. Devarajan	P. Bhaskaran	Jikki		Malayalam
Kadhaparayamo Katte	Sthreehridayam	1960	L. P. R. Varma	P. Bhaskaran	Jikki		Malayalam
Kadhiraadum Kazhaniyil Sadhiraadum Pennmani	Paditha Penn	1956	Arun & Raghavan	Pattukkottai Kalyanasundaram	Jikki		Tamil
Kaiyum Kaiyum Kalanthida Vaa	Kadan Vaangi Kalyaanam	1958	S. Rajeswara Rao	Thanjai N. Ramaiah Dass	P. Leela	T. R. Ramachandran	Tamil
Kalai Ezhil Visiye	Sabash Ramu	1959	T. M. Ibrahim	Ku. Sa. Krishnamurthy	P. Susheela	J. V. Ramana Murthi	Tamil
Kalaiye En Vaazkkaiyin Thisai Maatrinaai	Meenda Sorgam	1960	T. Chalapathi Rao	Kannadasan	P. Susheela	Gemini Ganesan	Tamil
Kalalenaa Mana Kadhalu	Na Chellelu	1953	C. N. Pandurangan		A. P. Komala		Telugu
Kalayemo Idi Naa Jeevita Phalamemo	Pakka Inti Ammayi	1953	G. Aswathama	Muddu Krishna		A. M. Rajah	Telugu
Kalaye Naa Jeevithamunu Marchene	Sthree Hrudayam	1961	Nityanand	Anisetti Subba Rao	S. Janaki	Gemini Ganesan	Telugu
Kalaiye Aagum Suvai	Veerasundari	1954	G. Ramanathan		K. Jamuna Rani	K. B. Janakiram	Tamil
Kalaiye Un Vizhi Kooda	Guna Sundari	1955	Ghantasala	Thanjai N. Ramaiah Dass		Gemini Ganesan	Tamil
Kalangmilla Kathalile	Illara Jothi	1954	G. Ramanathan	Kannadasan	Jikki	Sivaji Ganesan	Tamil
Kalasi Po Po	Kashta Sukhalu	1961	A. M. Rajah	Venugopal	Pithapuram Nageswara Rao, P. Susheela & Jikki	Sivaji Ganesan	Telugu
Kaligindi Ee Kaḷyaana Bhaavana	C.I.D.	1956	Pendyala Nageswara Rao	Sri Sri	C. S. Sarojini, Soolamangalam Rajalakshmi & B. Subramanyam		Telugu
Kanan Pattatha	Kuppivala	1965	M. S. Baburaj	P. Bhaskaran			Malayalam
Kanavilum Ninaivilum	Marumagal	1953	C. R. Subburaman & G. Ramanathan	Udumalai Narayana Kavi	P. A. Periyanayaki	N. T. Rama Rao	Tamil
Kanavugal Thaan Vazhvaadaa	Aaavathellam Pennaale	1957	Jeevan	Puratchidasan			Tamil
Kangalin Varthaigal Theriyatho	Kalathur Kannamma	1960	R. Sudarsanam	Ku. Ma. Balasubramaniam	P. Susheela	Gemini Ganesan	Tamil
Kannemaavi Thotalona	Ammalakkalu	1953	C. R. Subburaman & G. Ramanathan	Samudrala Jr.	P. A. Periyanayaki	N. T. Rama Rao	Telugu
Kannule Vintaga Palikeno	Mavoori Ammayi	1960	R. Sudarsanam	Anisetti	P. Susheela	Gemini Ganesan	Telugu
Kan Paadum Ponvanname	Sahodhari	1959	R. Sudarsanam	Kannadasan	K. Jamuna Rani	Prem Nazir	Tamil
Kani Mozhi Mathe Vaa	Rajambal	1951	M. S. Gnanamani	A. Maruthakasi	P. Leela	R. S. Manohar	Tamil
Kan Kanathathum Manam Kandu Vidum	Avan	1953	Shankar Jaikishan	Kambadasan	Jikki	Raj Kapoor	Tamil
Kanmani Nee En	Kuppivala	1965	M. S. Baburaj	P. Bhaskaran	P. Susheela		Malayalam
Kanmoodum Velaiyilum	Mahadhevi	1957	Viswanathan–Ramamoorthy	Kannadasan	P. Susheela	M. G. Ramachandran	Tamil
Kanna Neeyurangu	Lokaneethi	1952	V. Dakshinamoorthy	Abhayadev			Malayalam
Kannai Parikkum Vannam	Ellam Inba Mayam	1955	Ghantasala	V. Seetharaman	P. Leela	T. R. Ramachandran	Tamil
Kannale Naan Kanda Kaname	Parthiban Kanavu	1960	Vedha	A. Maruthakasi	P. Susheela	Gemini Ganesan	Tamil
Kanne En Sunthariye		1953					Tamil
Kanne Varna Malar Kodiye	Aana Valarthiya Vanampadi	1959	Br Lakshmanan	Thirunainar Kurichi Madhavan Nair			Malayalam
Kanneer Thuliyaal Enrum	Arabu Naattu Azhagi	1961	Vijaya Bhaskar		P. Susheela	Mahipal	Tamil
Kannerein Kadalil Ode	Veettukku Vandha Varalakshmi	1957	Pendyala Nageswara Rao	Poongkuyilan	P. Susheela	N. T. Rama Rao	Tamil
Kanneeti Kadalilona Chukkanileni Naava	Bhagya Rekha	1957	Pendyala Nageswara Rao	Devulapalli Krishnasastri	P. Susheela	N. T. Rama Rao	Telugu
Kanninu Punyamekum	Genova	1953	T. A. Kalyanam, M. S. Gnanamani & M. S. Viswanathan	Peethambaran	P. Leela	M. G. Ramachandran	Malayalam
Kanniyarin Vellai manam Pol	Thirumbi Paar	1953	G. Ramanathan	Kannadasan	Swarnalatha	Sivaji Ganesan	Tamil
Kannizhantha Manither Munne	Aadi Perukku	1962	A. M. Rajah	Kannadasan	P. Susheela		Tamil
Kannu Kannu Kalisenu	Virisina Vennela	1961	A. M. Rajah	Anisetti Subba Rao	P. Susheela	Gemini Ganesan	Telugu
Kannukkul Minnal Kaatchi	Genova	1953	T. A. Kalyanam, M. S. Gnanamani & M. S. Viswanathan		P. Leela	M. G. Ramachandran	Tamil
Kannulalo Vennelalo	Manohara	1954	S. V. Venkatraman		Jikki	Sivaji Ganesan	Telugu
Kannum Pootti	Snehaseema	1954	V. Dakshinamoorthy	Abhayadev	P. Leela		Malayalam
Kanuchoopule Padeno	Veera Ghatothkacha	1959	Vijaya Bhaskar & Chitragupta	Sri Sri	P. Susheela		Telugu
Kanumooyu Velalo	Mahadhevi	1958	Viswanathan–Ramamoorthy & M. Subramanya Raju	Sri Sri	P. Susheela	M. G. Ramachandran	Telugu
Kannulato Palakarinchu	Pelli Kanuka	1960	A. M. Rajah	Acharya Aatreya	P. Susheela	A. Nageswara Rao	Telugu
Karirul Neram	Avan	1953	Shankar Jaikishan	Kambadasan		Raj Kapoor	Tamil
Karma Bhavame Goppa Margame	Manasichina Maguva	1960	S. M. Subbaiah Naidu	Sri Sri		Gemini Ganesan	Telugu
Karpanai Kanavile	Kathanayaki	1955	G. Ramanathan	A. Maruthakasi	Swarnalatha	T. R. Ramachandran	Tamil
Karuna Lola	Bhaktha Ambarisha	1959	L. Malleswara Rao	Gabbita Venkatarao		Kanta Rao	Telugu
Karuvile Uruvana	En Thangai	1952	C. N. Pandurangan	A. Maruthakasi		M. G. Ramachandran	Tamil
Kattandi Veera Kankanam	Veera Kankanam	1957	S. Dakshinamurthi	Aarudhra	Jikki	N. T. Rama Rao	Telugu
Kaviya Kathal Vazhvil Oviyam Naane	Gomathiyin Kaadhalan	1955	G. Ramanathan	Ku. Ma. Balasubramaniam	Jikki	T. R. Ramachandran	Tamil
Khashi Prapanncham Neeke Sontham	Ali Baba 40 Dongalu	1956	S. Dakshinamurthi	Aarudhra		K. A. Thangavelu	Telugu
Kizhakke Malayile Vennnilavoru	Lora Neeyevide	1971	M. S. Baburaj	Vayalar Ramavarma	B. Vasantha		Malayalam
Kilivathilil Muttivilichathu	Rebecca	1963	K. Raghavan	Vayalar Ramavarma	P. Susheela	Sathyan	Malayalam
Kodai Idi Kaatru	Manamagan Thevai	1957	G. Ramanathan		Jikki	A. Karunanidhi	Tamil
Koduththup Paar Paar Paar	Vidivelli	1960	A. M. Rajah	A. Maruthakasi	Thiruchi Loganathan, Jikki & P. Susheela	Sivaji Ganesan	Tamil
Kondaa Kondaa Lona	Aakali	1952	P. S. Divakar	Devulapalli Krishnasastri	Jikki & Pithapuram Nageswara Rao	Prem Nazir	Telugu
Kondalu Konalu Dhaatuchunu	Bhaktha Markandeya	1956	Viswanathan–Ramamoorthy	Samudrala Sr.	A. P. Komala		Telugu
Kottaali Lavvaroka Chaans	Bhagyavantulu	1962	Ghantasala	Ushashri	S. Janaki	M. N. Nambiar	Telugu
Kunukela Abbi Kunukela	Anaganaga Oka Raju	1959	T. M. Ibrahim	Sri Sri		M. G. Ramachandran	Telugu
Kondaa Konalaloana	Aggi Ramudu	1954	S. M. Subbaiah Naidu	Acharya Aatreya		N. T. Rama Rao	Telugu
Kulirekidunna Katte	Visappinte Vili	1952	P. S. Divakar		Kaviyoor Revamma	Thikkurissy Sukumaran Nair	Malayalam
Kunkumacharumaninju	Kidappadam	1955	V. Dakshinamoorthy	Abhayadev			Malayalam
Kunnathu Konnayum	Unniyaarcha	1962	K. Raghavan	P. Bhaskaran		Prem Nazir	Malayalam
Kuppivala Kilukkunna Kuyile Penne	Rajamalli	1965	B. A. Chidambaranath	P. Bhaskaran		Prem Nazir	Malayalam
Kuyile Kuyile	Umma	1960	M. S. Baburaj	P. Bhaskaran	P. Leela & M. S. Baburaj	K. P. Ummer	Malayalam
Kuyilisaiyum Kuzhalisaiyum	Sangilithevan	1960	T. G. Lingappa	K. D. Santhanam	K. Jamuna Rani		Tamil
Lahari Lahari	Bharya	1962	G. Devarajan	Vayalar Ramavarma	Jikki		Malayalam
Lechipotive Letha Manasuni	Inspector	1953	G. Ramanathan		Jikki	Sriram	Telugu
Leelaalolithame	Genova	1953	T. A. Kalyanam, M. S. Gnanamani & M. S. Viswanathan	Abhayadev	P. Leela	M. G. Ramachandran	Malayalam
Lokareethi Ariyadara	Bhaagyachakra	1956	Vijaya Bhaskar	Geethapriya	P. Susheela	Kalyan Kumar	Kannada
Lookaya Pelarei	Ahankara Sthree	1954	R. Muthusamy				Sinhala
Maadappiraave	Kathirunna Nikah	1965	G. Devarajan	Vayalar Ramavarma			Malayalam
Maalaiyidhe Nalla Verlaiyidhe	Marumalarchi	1956	Pendyala Nageswara Rao	M. S. Subramaniam	Jikki	Sriram	Tamil
Maalika Meloru Mannaathikkile	Kalithozhan	1966	G. Devarajan	P. Bhaskaran	S. Janaki		Malayalam
Malligai Poochendai Paaratthaan	Mangaikku Maangalyame Pradhaanam	1960	Jeevan	Puratchidasan	Jikki		Tamil
Manaseswari Mapputharu	Adimakal	1969	G. Devarajan	Vayalar Ramavarma		Sathyan	Malayalam
Maanathe Ezhunilamaalikayil	Rebecca	1963	K. Raghavan	Vayalar Ramavarma	Jikki	Sathyan	Malayalam
Maanju Povaam	Aathmaarpanam	1956	V. Dakshinamoorthy	Abhayadev		Prem Nazir	Malayalam
Maaradavela Maaramu	Ammalakkalu	1953	C. R. Subburaman & G. Ramanathan	Samudrala Jr.	P. A. Periyanayaki	N. T. Rama Rao	Telugu
Maariville	Aathmaarpanam	1956	V. Dakshinamoorthy	Abhayadev		Prem Nazir	Malayalam
Maariville Maranju Nee	Aathmaarpanam	1956	V. Dakshinamoorthy	Abhayadev		Prem Nazir	Malayalam
Maasila Unmaikaathale	Alibaabaavum Narpadhu Thirudargalum	1956	S. Dakshinamurthi	A. Maruthakasi	P. Bhanumathi	M. G. Ramachandran	Tamil
Maate Cheppana Oka Maate Cheppana	Mugguru Veerulu	1960	T. R. Pappa	Muddu Krishna	Jikki	C. L. Anandan	Telugu
Maatharmedini Taata Maarutassukhe	Amara Sandhesam	1954	K. Vara Prasada Rao	Sri Sri			Telugu
Maayaa Jaala Ulagam, Idhil	En Magal	1954	C. N. Pandurangan	Pavalar Velayuthasami		Ranjan	Tamil
Maayajaalamuna	Sri Kalahastiswara Mahatyam	1954	R. Sudarsanam & R. Govardhanam	Toleti Venkat Reddy		Rajkumar	Telugu
Maaya Madarathi Machhikaunule	Gnaneshwar	1963	Veluri Krishnamurthy	Malladi Ramakrishna Sastry			Telugu
Madhana O Madhana	Bhakta Jayadeva	1961	S. Rajeswara Rao	Samudrala Sr.	Jikki		Telugu
Madhanode Radhi En Jodi	Veettukku Vandha Varalakshmi	1957	Pendyala Nageswara Rao	Poongkuyilan	P. Susheela	N. T. Rama Rao	Tamil
Madhurashalu Pandina Velaye	Sthree Hrudayam	1961	Nityanand	Anisetti Subba Rao	S. Janaki	Gemini Ganesan	Telugu
Maduru Madurame Challani Reyi	Vipra Narayana	1954	S. Rajeswara Rao	Samudrala Sr.	P. Bhanumathi	A. Nageswara Rao	Telugu
Madhuram Madhuram Manoharam	Amara Sandhesam	1954	K. Vara Prasada Rao	Sri Sri		N. T. Rama Rao	Telugu
Mahalthapamethene	Snehaseema	1954	V. Dakshinamoorthy	Abhayadev			Malayalam
Malare oh Malare	Veetu Mapillai	1973	A. M. Rajah	Kannadasan		A. V. M. Rajan	Tamil
Malarin Mathuvellam	Vipra Narayana	1955	S. Rajeswara Rao	S. D. Sundharam	P. Bhanumathi	A. Nageswara Rao	Tamil
Maname Nirantha Deivam Enaiye	Maheswari	1955	G. Ramanathan		Jikki	Gemini Ganesan	Tamil
Manam Ennum Vaanile	Ellorum Innaattu Mannar	1960	T. G. Lingappa	R. Pazhanichami	P. Susheela	Gemini Ganesan	Tamil
Mana Natiya Medaiyil Aadinen	Meenda Sorgam	1960	T. Chalapathi Rao	Kannadasan	P. Susheela	Gemini Ganesan	Tamil
Manasa Lalasa Sangeetham Madumaya	Amara Sandhesam	1954	K. Vara Prasada Rao	Sri Sri	Raghunath Panigrahi		Telugu
Manasarani	Koodappirappu	1956	K. Raghavan	Vayalar Ramavarma			Malayalam
Manasammatham Thannatte	Bharya	1962	G. Devarajan	Vayalar Ramavarma	Jikki		Malayalam
Manasooge Sakha Tanuvooge Priya	Bhagya Rekha	1957	Pendyala Nageswara Rao	Devulapalli Krishnasastri	P. Susheela	N. T. Rama Rao	Telugu
Manasu Niluvadaye Naa	Parasakthi	1957	R. Sudarsanam	Samudrala Sr.		Sivaji Ganesan	Telugu
Manathe Deivam	Odayil Ninnu	1965	G. Devarajan	Vayalar Ramavarma			Malayalam
Mani Adiththadhinaal	Nalla Pillai	1953	Vedha		P. Leela	Bhagwan	Tamil
Manilaththil Vithiyai Vendra	Samsaram	1951	Emani Sankara Sastry	Kothamangalam Subbu			Tamil
Manoraajyathu	Aayisha	1964	R. K. Shekhar	Vayalar Ramavarma	P. Susheela & Mehboob		Malayalam
Manitha Vazlvile Inimai Serthidum							Tamil
Ma Prema Ghada Madurmmugada	Na Chellelu	1953	C. N. Pandurangan	Malladi Ramakrishna Sastry	R. Balasaraswathi Devi	Amaranadh	Telugu
Mapillai Doi	Manam Pola Mangalyam	1953	Adepalli Rama Rao	Kanaga Surabhi	P. Leela	Gemini Ganesan	Tamil
Maraiyaa Puyalaai Modhum	Sri Rama Bhaktha Hanuman	1958	Vijaya Bhaskar	Thanjai N. Ramaiah Dass	P. Susheela		Tamil
Mathi Valartha Podhu Maraiyin	Mala Oru Mangala Vilakku	1959	C. N. Pandurangan	Villiputhan			Tamil
Mayakkum Maalai	Gulebagavali	1955	K. V. Mahadevan	Vindhan	Jikki	M. G. Ramachandran	Tamil
Mayilpeeli	Kasavuthattam	1967	G. Devarajan	Vayalar Ramavarma	P. Susheela	Prem Nazir	Malayalam
Mayilpeeli (Pathos)	Kasavuthattam	1967	G. Devarajan	Vayalar Ramavarma	P. Susheela	Prem Nazir	Malayalam
Mai Vizhi Mel Painthu Odiye	Nalla Pillai	1953	Vedha		P. Leela	Bhagwan	Tamil
Manadhukku Theriyum Ennai	Enakkoru Magan Pirappaan	1975	A. M. Rajah		Jikki	A. V. M. Rajan	Tamil
Melumko Ranga	Vipra Narayana	1954	S. Rajeswara Rao	Samudrala Sr.		A. Nageswara Rao	Telugu
Methavi Pole Ethetho Pesi	Kalyanam Panniyum Brahmachari	1954	T. G. Lingappa	K. D. Santhanam	Jikki	Sivaji Ganesan	Tamil
Minnal Pol Aagum	Avan	1953	Shankar Jaikishan	Kambadasan		Raj Kapoor	Tamil
Mainor Life Rompa Jaali	Illarame Nallaram	1958	K. G. Moorthy			Gemini Ganesan	Tamil
Mohaniye En Momohiniye	Visappinte Vili	1952	P. S. Divakar		P. Leela		Malayalam
Moogavaina Nemile	Appu Chesi Pappu Koodu	1959	S. Rajeswara Rao	Pingali Nagendrarao		Jaggayya	Telugu
Mudiyum Enraal Padiyaadhu	Missiamma	1955	S. Rajeswara Rao	Thanjai N. Ramaiah Dass		Gemini Ganesan	Tamil
Muthaane Ente Muthaane	Aayisha	1964	R. K. Shekhar	Vayalar Ramavarma	P. Susheela		Malayalam
Muththarame Un Oodal Ennavo	Ranga Rattinam	1971	V. Kumar	Vaali	L. R. Eswari	Gemini Ganesan	Tamil
Naame Jeeva Sugam	Genova	1953	T. A. Kalyanam, M. S. Gnanamani & M. S. Viswanathan		P. Leela	M. G. Ramachandran	Tamil
Naan Seidha Poojaa Palam	Guna Sundari	1955	Ghantasala	Thanjai N. Ramaiah Dass	P. Leela	Gemini Ganesan	Tamil
Naanum Oru Manithana	Marumalarchi	1956	Pendyala Nageswara Rao	M. S. Subramaniam	P. Leela	Sriram	Tamil
Naa Premaraani Jeevanavaaṇi	Prapancham	1953	M. S. Gnanamani & Poornanandha	Sri Sri	M. S. Rajeswari		Tamil
Nadana Vaniyi	Kalithozhan	1966	G. Devarajan	P. Bhaskaran	S. Janaki	Prem Nazir	Malayalam
Nanda Nandana	Krishna Kuchela	1961	K. Raghavan	P. Bhaskaran	P. Leela		Malayalam
Nale Ee Panthalil	Ammayenna Sthree	1970	A. M. Rajah	Vayalar Ramavarma			Malayalam
Nalla Thamilzh Vilakke	Ellorum Vazhavendum	1962	Rajan–Nagendra	Villiputhan	Jikki	K. Balaji	Tamil
Nannu Pendladave	Penki Pellam	1956	K. Prasada Rao	Aarudhra	Jikki	N. T. Rama Rao	Telugu
Nava Mangalyavathi Kalyani	Mugguru Kodukulu	1952	P. S. Anantharaman & M. D. Parthasarathy		M. L. Vasanthakumari		Telugu
Navvithe Navaratnalu Ravvalu	Vadina	1955	R. Sudarsanam & G. Aswathama	Toleti Venkata Reddy		A. Nageswara Rao	Telugu
Nee Maatalu Nee Maatalu	Pakka Inti Ammayi	1953	G. Aswathama	Muddu Krishna		A. M. Rajah	Telugu
Nee Valapula Valalo Jikki Naa	Jaganmohini	1953	P. Shyamanna	Sri Sri	Jikki	A. K. Srinivasa Rao	Telugu
Neevewaravo Chiru Nawulato	Prema Lekhalu	1953	Shankar Jaikishan	Aarudhra	Jikki	Raj Kapoor	Telugu
Nee Sendru Odhu Kaatre	Pasiyin Kodumai	1952	P. S. Divakar	Paa. Adhimoolam	Kaviyoor Revamma	Prem Nazir	Tamil
Nee Sigge Singaarame	Bhagya Rekha	1957	Pendyala Nageswara Rao	Devulapalli Krishnasastri	P. Susheela	N. T. Rama Rao	Telugu
Nee Kaathalal En Anbellam	Gramathu Penn	1952	Naushad		M. L. Vasanthakumari	Dilip Kumar	Tamil
Neerilaa Kinattrinile Verilaa Vaazhaiyundu	Kadan Vaangi Kalyaanam	1958	S. Rajeswara Rao	Thanjai N. Ramaiah Dass		T. R. Ramachandran	Tamil
Nenu Oka Manisinaa	Melukolupu	1956	Pendyala Nageswara Rao		P. Leela	Sriram	Telugu
Nilaavile Oyyaaram	Petrathai	1953	Pendyala Nageswara Rao	M. S. Subramaniam	K. Rani	M. N. Nambiar	Tamil
Nilavum Malarum	Then Nilavu	1961	A. M. Rajah	Kannadasan	P. Susheela	Gemini Ganesan	Tamil
Ninaikkum Podhe Aha	Illarame Nallaram	1958	K. G. Moorthy		P. Susheela	Gemini Ganesan	Tamil
Nyaayave Devaadhi Deva	Sodari	1955	S. R. Padmanabha Sastry & G. K. Venkatesh	Hunsur Krishnamurthy		Rajkumar	Kannada
Odam Eri Senre	Aasai Magan	1953	V. Dakshinamoorthy	Kuyilan	P. Leela	Gemini Ganesan	Tamil
Oh Babuji ...	Poothali	1960	Br Lakshmanan	Thirunainar Kurichi Madhavan Nair	Kamukara Purushothaman		Malayalam
Mohaniye En Momohiniye	Pasiyin Kodumai	1952	P. S. Divakar	Kambadasan	P. Leela	Prem Nazir	Tamil
Oh Choopulu Kalisina Raja	Veera Jaggadu	1960	Pamarthi	Aarudhra	P. Susheela		Telugu
Oh Gaali Aagi Vinumaa	Aakali	1952	P. S. Divakar	Devulapalli Krishnasastri	Jikki	Prem Nazir	Telugu
Oh Kalalaratham Kadhiladu Cheliya	Manasichina Maguva	1960	S. M. Subbaiah Naidu	Sri Sri	Jikki	Gemini Ganesan	Telugu
Oh Manoharaa	Bhooloka Rambha	1958	C. N. Pandurangan		Radha Jayalakshmi	Gemini Ganesan	Telugu
Oh.. Neethan En Sontham	Marumagal	1953	C. R. Subburaman & G. Ramanathan	Udumalai Narayana Kavi	P. A. Periyanayaki	N. T. Rama Rao	Tamil
Oh Neeve Naa Prema	Ammalakkalu	1953	C. R. Subburaman & G. Ramanathan	Samudrala Jr.	P. A. Periyanayaki	N. T. Rama Rao	Telugu
Oh Pattali Antho Pavee Nee	Nalla Pillai	1953	Vedha			Bhagwan	Tamil
Oh Priyurala	Chakrapani	1954	P. Bhanumathi	Ravuri Satyanarayana Rao		A. Nageswara Rao	Telugu
Oh Sarangu Naava Nadipevaa	Sankranti	1952	G. Aswathama	Balijepalli Lakshmikanta Kavi	P. Leela	K. Siva Rao	Telugu
Oho Enthan Baby	Then Nilavu	1961	A. M. Rajah	Kannadasan	S. Janaki	Gemini Ganesan	Tamil
Onnum Puriyavillai Thambi	Anbu	1953	T. R. Pappa	Vindhan		Sivaji Ganesan	Tamil
Oohoo Oohoo Oohoo Baavaa	Varudu Kavali	1957	G. Ramanathan	Ravuri Satyanarayana Rao	Jikki		Telugu
Oru Kaattum Kaattalla	Avarunarunnu	1956	V. Dakshinamoorthy	Vayalar Ramavarma	Jikki		Malayalam
Oru Naal Idhu Oru Naal	Anbukkor Anni	1960	A. M. Rajah	Kannadasan	Jikki	Gemini Ganesan	Tamil
Oru Navayugame	Lokaneethi	1952	V. Dakshinamoorthy	Abhayadev	P. Leela & Kaviyoor Revamma		Malayalam
Oru Kattum Kattalla	Avan Varunnu	1954	V. Dakshinamoorthy	Vayalar Ramavarma	Jikki		Malayalam
Oruvan Orutthi	Veettukku Vandha Marumagal	1973	Shankar–Ganesh	Kannadasan	Jikki	R. Muthuraman	Tamil
Oviyanin Ullam Thannai	Aasai	1956	T. R. Pappa		T. V. Rathnam	Gemini Ganesan	Tamil
Paappaa Un Appaavai	Pathi Bakthi	1958	Viswanathan–Ramamoorthy	Pattukkottai Kalyanasundaram		Gemini Ganesan	Tamil
Paarthaai Paarthen Sirithaai Sirithen	Pasamum Nesamum	1964	Vedha	Kannadasan	P. Susheela	Gemini Ganesan	Tamil
Paatu Paada Vaa	Then Nilavu	1961	A. M. Rajah	Kannadasan		Gemini Ganesan	Tamil
Paavana Bharatha	Seetha	1960	V. Dakshinamoorthy	Abhayadev	P. B. Sreenivas		Malayalam
Paavana Hridayam	Visappinte Vili	1952	P. S. Divakar	Abhayadev		Thikkurissy Sukumaran Nair	Malayalam
Paavanamaami Damaree	Kidappadam	1955	V. Dakshinamoorthy	Abhayadev			Malayalam
Paavanamoorthee Gaadhane	Seeta	1961	M. Ranga Rao	Anisetti Subba Rao	P. B. Sreenivas		Telugu
Paavanamoorthy Seethamatha	Seeta	1961	M. Ranga Rao	Anisetti Subba Rao	P. B. Sreenivas		Telugu
Paavangalil Alivulla	Lokaneethi	1952	V. Dakshinamoorthy	Abhayadev	Kaviyoor Revamma		Malayalam
Padavoyi Nadichi Madi	Pratigna	1953	T. A. Kalyanam	Sri Sri		Kanta Rao	Telugu
Padu Jlvitamu	Prema Lekhalu	1953	Shankar Jaikishan	Aarudhra		Raj Kapoor	Telugu
Paimpaal Ozhukum Chola Thannil	Aana Valarthiya Vanampadi	1959	Br Lakshmanan	Thirunainar Kurichi Madhavan Nair	P. Leela		Malayalam
Paalaanu Thenaanen	Umma	1960	M. S. Baburaj	P. Bhaskaran		K. P. Ummer	Malayalam
Palazhikkadavil Neerattinirangiya	Kadalamma	1963	G. Devarajan	Vayalar Ramavarma	P. Susheela	Sathyan	Malayalam
Palimchara Ranga	Vipra Narayana	1954	S. Rajeswara Rao	Samudrala Sr.		A. Nageswara Rao	Telugu
Panathinle Neethihyil	Kidappadam	1955	V. Dakshinamoorthy	Abhayadev			Malayalam
Pann Paadi Varum Odai Neeril	Yaanai Valartha Vanampadi	1959	Br Lakshmanan	Surabhi	P. Leela		Tamil
Panthalittu	Aashadeepam	1953	V. Dakshinamoorthy	P. Bhaskaran	P. Leela		Malayalam
Pattadhaarigal Vaazhvidhu Thaanaa	Bale Raman	1956	T. A. Kalyanam	Kanaga Surabhi		A. Nageswara Rao	Tamil
Pattum Valayum	Ammayenna Sthree	1970	A. M. Rajah	Vayalar Ramavarma			Malayalam
Pattu Poochchi Polum	Aval Yaar	1959	S. Rajeswara Rao	Vidwan V. Lakshmanan	Jikki	Sivaji Ganesan	Tamil
Pazhaga Theriya Venum	Missiamma	1955	S. Rajeswara Rao	Thanjai N. Ramaiah Dass		Gemini Ganesan	Tamil
Pazhagum Thamizhe	Parthiban Kanavu	1960	Vedha	Kannadasan	P. Susheela	Gemini Ganesan	Tamil
Pennai Piranthathum Vithithano	Naga Panjami	1956	S. V. Venkatraman				Tamil
Pengal illaadha Ulagaththile	Aadi Perukku	1962	A. M. Rajah	Kothamangalam Subbu	P. Susheela	Gemini Ganesan	Tamil
Penkodi Penkodi	Kalanjukittiya Thankam	1964	G. Devarajan	Vayalar Ramavarma	P. Susheela		Malayalam
Pennin Perumaiye Perumai	Pathiye Deivam	1956	M. Ranga Rao				Tamil
Periyare Periyare	Bharya	1962	G. Devarajan	Vayalar Ramavarma	P. Susheela		Malayalam
Pesatha Mounam	Marumagal	1953	C. R. Subburaman & G. Ramanathan	Udumalai Narayana Kavi	P. A. Periyanayaki	N. T. Rama Rao	Tamil
Pesum Yazhe Pen Mane	Naam	1953	C. S. Jayaraman	M. Karunanidhi	Jikki	M. G. Ramachandran	Tamil
Pinnilakki Jeevathe	Avan Varunnu	1954	V. Dakshinamoorthy	Abhayadev			Malayalam
Pem Kekulu Pipee	Seda Sulang	1955	S. Dakshinamurthi, Ananda Samarakoon	D. T. Fernando	K. Jamuna Rani	Prem Jayanth	Sinhalese
Penugonu Manasula	Ammalakkalu	1953	C. R. Subburaman & G. Ramanathan	Samudrala Jr.	P. A. Periyanayaki	N. T. Rama Rao	Telugu
Polame Mana Jeevithamu	Sankranti	1952	G. Aswathama	Balijepalli Lakshmikanta Kavi	N. Lalitha Bhanu	K. Siva Rao	Telugu
Pon Makane ...	Achan	1952	P. S. Divakar	Abhayadev	Kaviyoor Revamma & Madhavapeddi Satyam		Malayalam
Ponndutthu Padaitthaano	Thirumbi Paar	1953	G. Ramanathan	Kannadasan	K. Rani & T. S. Bagavathi		Tamil
Poolabaala Mrudhuraagala	Mahalakshmi Mahima	1959	S. N. Tripati & T.M. Ibrahim	Sri Sri	Jikki		Telugu
Poomakalaane	Aayisha	1964	R. K. Shekhar	Vayalar Ramavarma	P. Susheela		Malayalam
Poomala Vittodiyirangiya	Achanum Makanum	1956	Vimal Kumar	P. Bhaskaran	Jikki		Malayalam
Poovil Vandu Bothai Kondu	Anbu Engey	1958	Vedha	Thanjai N. Ramaiah Dass	K. Jamuna Rani	K. Balaji	Tamil
Poru Nee Ponmayile	Umma	1960	M. S. Baburaj	P. Bhaskaran	P. Leela	K. P. Ummer	Malayalam
Pothum Unthan Jalame	Kadan Vaangi Kalyaanam	1958	S. Rajeswara Rao	Thanjai N. Ramaiah Dass		T. R. Ramachandran	Tamil
Pozhudhu Vidindhaal Thirumamam	Thirumbi Paar	1953	G. Ramanathan	Kannadasan	T. S. Bagavathi	Sivaji Ganesan	Tamil
Prabhu Dhyamaya	Sipayi Kuthuru	1959	M. Subramanya Raju				Telugu
Prajakalundo Prajakalundo	Seetha	1960	V. Dakshinamoorthy	Abhayadev	Jikki, P. B. Sreenivas & Punitha		Malayalam
Prakasam Pole Premaiyinaale	Gramathu Penn	1952	Naushad	Papanasam Sivan	P. Leela	Dilip Kumar	Tamil
Preyasī Naa Hrdilo	Pakka Inti Ammayi	1953	G. Aswathama	Muddu Krishna		A. M. Rajah	Telugu
Prasadakunkumam	Love Marriage	1975	Ahuan Sebastian	Mankombu Gopalakrishnan		Prem Nazir	Malayalam
Preethiyen Sathutin	Saradam	1957	S. Dakshinamurthi		K. Jamuna Rani		Sinhala
Premada Preetiya Poojari	Bhaagyachakra	1956	Vijaya Bhaskar	Geethapriya	Jikki		Kannada
Premaiyin Ranee Kaathalinaale	Ulagam	1953	M. S. Gnanamani		M. S. Rajeswari		Tamil
Premave Lokada Hjeeva	Sadarame	1956	R. Sudarsanam & R. Govardhanam		P. Susheela		Kannada
Priyamuga Mudhirammune	Veera Jaggadu	1960	Pamarthi	Aarudhra	P. Susheela		Telugu
Priya Ramunala Choosi	Sri Rama Bhaktha Hanuman	1958	Vijaya Bhaskar	Sri Sri	P. Susheela		Telugu
Priyathama Manasu Maaruna	Ali Baba 40 Dongalu	1956	S. Dakshinamurthi		P. Bhanumathi	M. G. Ramachandran	Telugu
Pularee Pularee	Kalithozhan	1966	G. Devarajan	P. Bhaskaran	S. Janaki	Prem Nazir	Malayalam
Pullanenikku Ninte ...	Unniyaarcha	1962	K. Raghavan	P. Bhaskaran	P. Leela		Malayalam
Puthumai Nila Ange	Gomathiyin Kaadhalan	1955	G. Ramanathan	Ku. Ma. Balasubramaniam		T. R. Ramachandran	Tamil
Puthuvarsham	Aathmaarpanam	1956	V. Dakshinamoorthy	Abhayadev	P. Leela	Prem Nazir	Malayalam
Raavaa Raa Raavaa Naa	Anumanam Penubhutham	1967	K. V. Mahadevan & Suryam	Anisetti	P. Susheela	Sivaji Ganesan	Telugu
Raave Manohara Jaganmohana	Jaganmohini	1953	P. Shyamanna	Sri Sri	P. Leela	A. K. Srinivasa Rao	Telugu
Rajadhi Rajulu Ee Jananam	Yesu Prabhuvu	1973	V. Kumar	Rajasri	K. Swarna	Gemini Ganesan	Telugu
Rajakumari	Aayisha	1964	R. K. Shekhar	Vayalar Ramavarma	P. Susheela & Mehboob		Malayalam
Rakkuyile Rakkuyile	Minnalppadayaali	1959	P. S. Divakar & S. N. Ranganathan	P. Bhaskaran	S. Janaki		Malayalam
Raamaraajyathinte	Seetha	1960	V. Dakshinamoorthy	Abhayadev			Malayalam
Rama Rama	Seetha	1960	V. Dakshinamoorthy	Abhayadev			Malayalam
Ramanan	Visappinte Vili	1952	P. S. Divakar	Abhayadev	P. Leela, Kaviyoor Revamma & Jose Prakash	Thikkurissy Sukumaran Nair	Malayalam
Ranga Kaveti Ranga	Vipra Narayana	1954	S. Rajeswara Rao	Samudrala Sr.		A. Nageswara Rao	Telugu
Ranga Sriranga Naa Moravinara	Vipra Narayana	1954	S. Rajeswara Rao	Samudrala Sr.		A. Nageswara Rao	Telugu
Rarada Madi Ninne	Prema Lekhalu	1953	Shankar Jaikishan	Aarudhra	Jikki	Raj Kapoor	Telugu
Ra Rado Rachiluka	Chinna Kodalu	1952	G. Aswathama	Malladi Ramakrishna Sastry	R. Balasaraswathi Devi	G. Narayana Rao	Telugu
Rasi Nalla Rasi	Veetu Mapillai	1973	A. M. Rajah	Vaali	Jikki	A. V. M. Rajan	Tamil
Ravo Kanaravo Itu Ranelevo	Bommala Pelli	1958	K. V. Mahadevan	Acharya Aatreya	Jikki	Sivaji Ganesan	Telugu
Ravoyii chandamama	Missamma	1955	S. Rajeswara Rao	Pingali Nagendrarao	P. Leela	N. T. Rama Rao	Telugu
Ravisasinayanaa Namo Namo BhavabhayaharaNaa	Sri Kalahastiswara Mahatyam	1954	R. Sudarsanam & R. Govardhanam	Toleti Venkat Reddy			Telugu
Roja Malarai Pole	Enakkoru Magan Pirappaan	1975	A. M. Rajah		P. Susheela	A. V. M. Rajan	Tamil
Rubber Balloon Paaru	Nalla Veedu	1956	Krishnamurthi & Nagaraja Iyer	M. P. Sivam			Tamil
Saagnee Jeevitham Jorugaa	Pratigna	1953	T. A. Kalyanam	Sri Sri		Kanta Rao	Telugu
Saakshaal Mahaavishnu	Krishna Kuchela	1961	K. Raghavan	P. Bhaskaran			Malayalam
Sadastkalaa Ksheera Jala Vibhaga Kriya Nipuna	Amara Sandhesam	1954	K. Vara Prasada Rao	Sri Sri		Amarnath	Telugu
Sagara Alai Geethame	C.I.D	1955	Br Lakshmanan		C. S. Sarojini	Sriram	Tamil
Sagara Sangeetame Nava	C.I.D.	1956	Pendyala Nageswara Rao	Sri Sri	C. S. Sarojini	Jaggayya	Telugu
Samsaram Samsaram	Samsaram	1951	Emani Sankara Sastry	Kothamangalam Subbu			Tamil
Sandhoshamethaaan Sangeethamagum	Santhanam	1955	S. Dakshinamurthi	Kuyilan	K. Jamuna Rani		Tamil
Saradhaga Jalsaga Andharamu	Pempudu Koduku	1953	S. Rajeswara Rao	Sri Sri		Sivaji Ganesan	Telugu
Saukhyamelaa Jagatiyandu	Mavoori Ammayi	1960	R. Sudarsanam	Anisetti		Gemini Ganesan	Telugu
Sayyataladu Nadumu	Kashta Sukhalu	1961	A. M. Rajah	Venugopal	P. Susheela	Sivaji Ganesan	Telugu
Seitha Pavathinale	Genova	1953	T. A. Kalyanam, M. S. Gnanamani & M. S. Viswanathan			M. G. Ramachandran	Tamil
Selaadum Nirodai	Allavudeenum Arputha Vilakkum	1957	S. Rajeswara Rao & S. Hanumantha Rao	Kannadasan	P. Susheela	A. Nageswara Rao	Tamil
Sen Thamaraiye	Puhuntha Veedu	1972	Shankar–Ganesh	Vichithra	Jikki	A. V. M. Rajan	Tamil
Seva Cheyute Anandam	Mahadhevi	1958	Viswanathan–Ramamoorthy & M. Subramanya Raju	Sri Sri	P. Susheela	M. G. Ramachandran	Telugu
Sharanu Sharanu Deva Ranjana	Gnaneshwar	1963	Veluri Krishnamurthy	Malladi Ramakrishna Sastry			Telugu
Shokam Enthinaay	Lokaneethi	1952	V. Dakshinamoorthy	Abhayadev			Malayalam
Sihil Sulang	Sukumalee	1957	P. S. Divakar				Sinhala
Sirpi Sethukkatha Potchilaye	Edhir Paradhathu	1954	C. N. Pandurangan	K. P. Kamatchi		Sivaji Ganesan	Tamil
Singara Paingiliye Pesu	Manohara	1954	S. V. Venkatraman	Udumalai Narayana Kavi	Radha Jayalakshmi	Sivaji Ganesan	Tamil
Sirimalle Sogasu Jabilli Velugu	Puttinillu Mettinillu	1973	C. Satyam	Daasarathi Krishnamacharyulu	P. Susheela	Sobhan Babu	Telugu
Snehathil Vidarunnu	Ballatha Pahayan	1969	K. V. Job	Sreekumaran Thampi	P. Susheela		Malayalam
Sojaa Naa Manohari	Anarkali	1955	P. Adinarayana Rao	Samudrala Sr.		A. Nageswara Rao	Telugu
Solla Venuma Innum Sollavenuma	Vijayapuri Veeran	1960	T. R. Pappa		Jikki	C. L. Anandan	Tamil
Soraadhe Nenje Inbamo	Nalla Penmani	1954	P. S. Divakar	A. S. Rajagopal		Thikkurissy Sukumaran Nair	Tamil
Sri Kaalahasthiswara	Sri Kalahastiswara Mahatyam	1954	R. Sudarsanam & R. Govardhanam	Toleti Venkat Reddy		Title song	Telugu
Sundaranga Divyahasa	Gnaneshwar	1963	Veluri Krishnamurthy	Malladi Ramakrishna Sastry			Telugu
Sundarangulanu	Appu Chesi Pappu Koodu	1959	S. Rajeswara Rao	Pingali Nagendrarao	P. Leela & Ghantasala	K Jaggayya	Telugu
Suntharangiyai Parhathanale	Kadan Vaangi Kalyaanam	1958	S. Rajeswara Rao	Thanjai N. Ramaiah Dass	P. Leela & Sirkazhi Govindarajan	Gemini Ganesan	Tamil
Swagatha Suswagatha	Ajnathi	1958					Kannada
Tanemi Talamcheno	Dampathyam	1957	Pasupuleti Ramesh Naidu	Aarudhra	R. Balasaraswathi Devi	A. Nageswara Rao	Telugu
Tanuvita Sasvatamaunaa Jeevi	Na Chellelu	1953	C. N. Pandurangan				Telugu
Telusukonave Yuvathi	Missamma	1955	S. Rajeswara Rao	Pingali Nagendrarao		N. T. Rama Rao	Telugu
Thamarakulakkadavil	School Master	1964	G. Devarajan	Vayalar Ramavarma	P. Susheela	K. Balaji	Malayalam
Thane Toli Ashalu	Arabhi Veerudu Jabak	1961	Vijaya Bhaskar & Chitragupta	Sri Sri	P. Susheela	Mahipal	Telugu
Than Manadhai Nalanukku	Kadan Vaangi Kalyaanam	1958	S. Rajeswara Rao	Thanjai N. Ramaiah Dass	P. Leela & Sirkazhi Govindarajan	Gemini Ganesan	Tamil
Thanganilavil Kendai Irandum	Thirumanam	1958	S. M. Subbaiah Naidu & T. G. Lingappa	Kannadasan	Jikki	Gemini Ganesan	Tamil
Thanimaiyile Innimai	Aadi Perukku	1962	A. M. Rajah	K. D. Santhanam		Gemini Ganesan	Tamil
Thanimaiyile Innimai	Aadi Perukku	1962	A. M. Rajah	K. D. Santhanam	P. Susheela	Gemini Ganesan	Tamil
Tharavin Parvaiyile Oh Vennilave	Kadan Vaangi Kalyaanam	1958	S. Rajeswara Rao	Thanjai N. Ramaiah Dass	P. Leela	T. R. Ramachandran	Tamil
Thazhampoo Manamulla	Adimakal	1969	G. Devarajan	Vayalar Ramavarma		Sathyan	Malayalam
Theerenuga Netitone	Pelli Kanuka	1960	A. M. Rajah	Samudrala Sr.	P. Susheela	A. Nageswara Rao	Telugu
Thelikagaa Thelikagaa Chulakanagaa	Palle Paduchu	1954	M. S. Rama Rao	Aarudhra	Jikki		Telugu
Then Unnum Vandu	Amara Deepam	1956	T. Chalapathi Rao	K. P. Kamatchi	P. Susheela	Sivaji Ganesan	Tamil
Theriyuma, Theriyuma Punnagai Seydhathen	Pasamum Nesamum	1964	Vedha	Kannadasan		Gemini Ganesan	Tamil
Thendral Urangiya Pothum	Petra Maganai Vitra Annai	1958	Viswanathan–Ramamoorthy	A. Maruthakasi	P. Susheela	S. S. Rajendran	Tamil
Thirai Potu Naame	Raja Rani	1956	T. R. Pappa	A. Maruthakasi	Jikki	Sivaji Ganesan	Tamil
Thirumana Poruttham Paatthaachu	Malliyam Mangalam	1960	T. A. Kalyanam	M. K. Athmanathan	P. Susheela		Tamil
Thooya Iru Manam	Pasiyin Kodumai	1952	P. S. Divakar	Paa. Adhimoolam		Prem Nazir	Tamil
Thottal Mookkinnu	Sthreehridayam	1960	L. P. R. Varma	P. Bhaskaran			Malayalam
Thulli Thulli Alaigal Ellam	Thalai Koduthaan Thambi	1959	Viswanathan–Ramamoorthy	Pattukottai Kalyanasundaram	P. Susheela	R. S. Manohar	Tamil
Thulliye Odume Vaazhvume	Vanjam	1953	T. A. Kalyanam	Guhan		Kanta Rao	Tamil
Thunbam Soozhum	Genova	1953	T. A. Kalyanam, M. S. Gnanamani & M. S. Viswanathan			M. G. Ramachandran	Tamil
Thuyilatha Pen Ondru kanden	Meenda Sorgam	1960	T. Chalapathi Rao	Kannadasan	P. Susheela	Gemini Ganesan	Tamil
Toda Needa Evaro Ho Kori	Anumanam Penubhutham	1967	K. V. Mahadevan & Suryam	Anisetti	P. Susheela	Sivaji Ganesan	Telugu
Udavaale Padavaale ...	Unniyaarcha	1962	K. Raghavan	P. Bhaskaran	P. B. Sreenivas		Malayalam
Ulaavum Thendral Nilaavaip Pirivathu	Koteeswaran	1955	S. V. Venkatraman	Thanjai N. Ramaiah Dass	P. Susheela	Sivaji Ganesan	Tamil
Ullangal Ondragi	Punar Janmam	1961	T. Chalapathi Rao	Pattukkottai Kalyanasundaram	P. Susheela	Sivaji Ganesan	Tamil
Ullathile Uram Vendumada	Vijayapuri Veeran	1960	T. R. Pappa	Thanjai N. Ramaiah Dass		C. L. Anandan	Tamil
Un Anbaith Thedugindren	Arabu Naattu Azhagi	1961	Vijaya Bhaskar		P. Susheela	Mahipal	Tamil
Un Kathalalal En Anbellam	Ulagam	1953	M. S. Gnanamani		M. L. Vasanthakumari		Tamil
Unnai Kandu Naan Vaada	Kalyana Parisu	1959	A. M. Rajah	Pattukkottai Kalyanasundaram		Gemini Ganesan	Tamil
Unnai Partha Kangal Irandum	Maganey Kel	1965	Viswanathan–Ramamoorthy	Pattukkottai Kalyanasundaram	P. Susheela	S. S. Rajendran	Tamil
Unnatha Nilayil	Visappinte Vili	1952	P. S. Divakar	Abhayadev		Thikkurissy Sukumaran Nair	Malayalam
Unezhil Madhiyo	Nalla Penmani	1954	P. S. Divakar	A. S. Rajagopal		Thikkurissy Sukumaran Nair	Tamil
Unni Pirannu	Seetha	1960	V. Dakshinamoorthy	Abhayadev			Malayalam
Upayale Telusukoni	Anaganaga Oka Raju	1959	T. M. Ibrahim	Sri Sri	P. Bhanumathi	M. G. Ramachandran	Telugu
Uttamunne Saki Adhamunne	Gnaneshwar	1963	Veluri Krishnamurthy	Malladi Ramakrishna Sastry			Telugu
Vaadikkai Maranthathum Eno	Kalyana Parisu	1959	A. M. Rajah	Pattukkottai Kalyanasundaram	P. Susheela	Gemini Ganesan	Tamil
Vaaduka Marchedavela	Pelli Kanuka	1960	A. M. Rajah	Karthik	P. Susheela	A. Nageswara Rao	Telugu
Vaanambaadigal Polae	Kalvanin Kathali- Stage Play by T. K. Shanmugam	1956	M. K. Athmanathan	M. K. Athmanathan	A. Andaal	T. K. Shanmugam	Tamil
Vaanil Kaanum Nilave	Aasai	1956	T. R. Pappa		Jikki	Gemini Ganesan	Tamil
Vaanil Nilavile	Jameenthaar	1952	G. Ramanathan		Jikki		Tamil
Vaanin Nilave.... Vaanam Sendraayo	Anbu	1953	T. R. Pappa	Kambadasan		Sivaji Ganesan	Tamil
Vaanmadhi Yaagiye Naam Ulaavalaam	Maya Mohini	1956	T. Chalapathi Rao	Thanjai N. Ramaiah Dass	Jikki	Jairaj	Tamil
Vaaraai Vaaraai En Manohara	Ezhai Uzhavan	1952	H. R. Padmanabha Sastri	Kavi Lakshmanadas	Jikki		Tamil
Vaarayo Vennilave	Missiamma	1955	S. Rajeswara Rao	Thanjai N. Ramaiah Dass	P. Leela	Gemini Ganesan	Tamil
Vaazhvinile Vaazhvinile	Vanangamudi	1957	G. Ramanathan	Thanjai N. Ramaiah Dass	P. Susheela	Sivaji Ganesan	Tamil
Vaasamigum Malar Cholaiyile	Yaar Paiyyan	1957	S. Dakshinamurthi	A. Maruthakasi	Jikki	Gemini Ganesan	Tamil
Vaazhkai Embathu	Kadhavai Thattiya Mohini Pei	1975	C. N. Pandurangan				Tamil
Vaazhkaiyo Vedu Dhooram	Nalla Penmani	1954	P. S. Divakar	A. S. Rajagopal		Thikkurissy Sukumaran Nair	Tamil
Vaazhvadhum Thaazhvadhum Panathale	Moondru Pillaigal	1952	P. S. Anantharaman & M. D. Parthasarathy	Kothamangalam Subbu			Tamil
Vaazhve Sohamthana	Paropakaram	1953	Ghantasala	Kavi Lakshmanadas	Ghantasala, P. Leela & A. P. Komala		Tamil
Vaazhvinile Nannaalithuve	Mamiyar	1953	C. N. Pandurangan		S. Varalakshmi		Tamil
Valayal Aiya Valayal	Aasai	1956	T. R. Pappa		N. S. Krishnan	Gemini Ganesan	Tamil
Vanniallo Ledhu	Kanyadhaanam	1955	Nagarajan	Sri Sri		Kanta Rao	Telugu
Vanthathu Vasantham	Edhir Paradhathu	1954	C. N. Pandurangan	Kanaga Surabhi	Jikki	Sivaji Ganesan	Tamil
Varuven Nan Unathu	Mallika	1957	T. R. Pappa	A. Maruthakasi	P. Susheela	Gemini Ganesan	Tamil
Varum Kaalam Nalla Kaalam	Aasai	1956	T. R. Pappa	A. Maruthakasi	Jikki	Gemini Ganesan	Tamil
Varunnu Njan	Avan Varunnu	1954	V. Dakshinamoorthy	Abhayadev			Malayalam
Vannu Vannu Christmas	Snehaseema	1954	V. Dakshinamoorthy	Abhayadev	Madhavapeddi Satyam		Malayalam
Vedale Ee Rajakumarudu	Bangaru Papa	1955	Addepalli Rama Rao	Devulapalli Krishnasastri	P. Susheela	Jaggayya	Telugu
Veenil Eno Vedhanai	Pakka Thirudan	1957	T. M. Ibrahim	Mugavai Rajamanikkam		A. Nageswara Rao	Tamil
Veettilorutharum	Kathirunna Nikah	1965	G. Devarajan	Vayalar Ramavarma	P. Susheela		Malayalam
Vellambal	Achanum Makanum	1956	Vimal Kumar	Thirunalloor Karunakaran			Malayalam
Velli Meenum Thulli Aduthu	Orey Vazhi	1959	R. Govardhanam	Kannadasan	P. Susheela	Prem Nazir	Tamil
Vennilavin Oli Thanile	Baagyavathi	1957	S. Dakshinamurthi	A. Maruthakasi	T. V. Rathnam & S. C. Krishnan	Sivaji Ganesan	Tamil
Vibhuni Nirmala Bhakti	Amara Sandhesam	1954	K. Vara Prasada Rao	Sri Sri	Jikki		Telugu
Vidi Rakasi	Prema Lekhalu	1953	Shankar Jaikishan	Aarudhra		Raj Kapoor	Telugu
Vidhi Vilasava Enembe	Sodari	1955	S. R. Padmanabha Sastry & G. K. Venkatesh	Hunsur Krishnamurthy		Rajkumar	Kannada
Vijayame Mana Sadhanara	Mugguru Veerulu	1960	T. R. Pappa	Muddu Krishna		C. L. Anandan	Telugu
Vinavoi Rajakumara	Desinguraju Katha	1960	Pamarthi	Sri Sri	P. Susheela	S. S. Rajendran	Telugu
Viraaliketu Thaalane (Vidhi Bhaagavatam)	Sankranti	1952	G. Aswathama	Balijepalli Lakshmikanta Kavi	N. Lalitha Bhanu	K. Siva Rao	Telugu
Virodha Melane	Pempudu Koduku	1953	S. Rajeswara Rao	Sri Sri		Sivaji Ganesan	Telugu
Visaadajvaala Reginaa Vivaadha Dola	Manchini Penchali	1980	A. M. Rajah				Telugu
Vittala Dhayava Beero	Bhakta Vijaya	1955	Shyam-Aathmanath	Anand		Rajkumar	Kannada
Vittala Rakumaayi	Bhakta Vijaya	1955	Shyam-Aathmanath	Anand		Rajkumar	Kannada
Yaedho Naveena Bhavam	Amara Sandhesam	1954	K. Vara Prasada Rao	Sri Sri		N. T. Rama Rao	Telugu
Yaazhum Kulazhum	Koteeswaran	1955	S. V. Venkatraman	T. K. Sundara Vathiyar	P. Susheela	Sriram	Tamil
Yavvana Madhuvanilo Vannela	Bangaru Papa	1955	Addepalli Rama Rao	Devulapalli Krishnasastri	P. Susheela	Jaggayya	Telugu
Yavvanamantaa Navanavalaade	Sobha	1958	A. M. Rajah	P. Vasanth Kumar Reddy		N. T. Rama Rao	Telugu
Yenduko Pilichavenduko	Kanna Talli	1953	Pendyala Nageswara Rao	Sri Sri & Aarudhra	P. Susheela	A. Nageswara Rao	Telugu
Yogamathe Ezhilam	Vipra Narayana	1955	S. Rajeswara Rao	S. D. Sundharam		A. Nageswara Rao	Tamil
