= Achan (1952 film) =

1952 film by M.R.S. Mani

- Directed by: M. R. S. Mani
- Written by: Thikkurissy Sukumaran Nair
- Screenplay by: Thikkurissy Sukumaran Nair
- Produced by: M. Kunchacko
- Starring: Prem Nazir, B. S. Saroja
- Cinematography: P. Balasubramaniam
- Edited by: Mrs. Rajagopal
- Music by: P. S. Divakar
- Production company: Excel Productions
- Release date: 24 December 1952
- Country: India
- Language: Malayalam

Achan (transl. Father) is a 1952 Indian Malayalam-language film, directed by M. R. S. Mani and produced by M. Kunchacko. The film stars Prem Nazir and B. S. Saroja in lead roles. The film had musical score by P. S. Divakar. This was the only film in which veteran actor Sesbastian Kunjukunju Bhagavatahar did a comic role. It is one of the major box office hits of early Malayalam cinema. It will be remembered as the debut of Boban Kunchacko, the maiden venture of XL Productions, and first film of Thiruvananthapuram V. Lakshmi. The film was remade in Tamil as Thanthai, again with Prem Nazir. Kambadasan wrote the dialogues and lyrics. The film was released in April 1953. The film was dubbed in Telugu as Tandri (1953).

== Cast ==
Female cast

- B. S. Saroja as Usha, an artist in Nanukkuttan's drama troupe
- Baby Girija
- T. Jaya Shree
- Pankajavalli
- Adoor Pankajam
- C. R. Lakshmi
- Vanakkutty

Male cast

- Thikkurissy Sukumaran Nair
- Prem Nazir
- Boban Kunchacko
- C. L. Anandan
- Kunjukunju Bhagavathar as Nanukkuttan, a drama troupe owner
- S. P. Pillai as Mathu, leader of a group of rogues
- Mathappan

Dance

- B. S. Saroja
- C. R. Rajakumari
- Madura Devi
- Ramani Gopal
- Baby Girija

== Tamil cast ==
Cast adapted from the song book

Main cast

- B. S. Saroja as Usha
- Baby Girija as Young Usha
- Jaya Shree as Aunt
- Pankajavalli as Lady Musician
- Adoor Pankajam as Usha's Friend
- Sukumaran as Father
- Boban Kunchacko as Young Chandran
- Master Pinay as Young Chandran
- Prem Nazir as Chandran
- Kunjukunju Bhagavathar as Nanukkuttan
- S. P. Pillai as Lady
- Mathappan as Koman

Dance

- B. S. Saroja
- C. R. Rajakumari
- Madura Devi
- Ramani Gopal
- Baby Girija

== Soundtrack ==
P. S. Divakar composed the music for both Malayalam and Tamil versions.

Songs

Lyrics were written by Abhayadev. Playback singers are A. M. Rajah, Madhavapeddi Satyam, Kozhikode Abdul Kader, P. Leela, Thiruvananthapuram V. Lakshmi & Kaviyoor Revamma.

No.	Song	Singer/s	Duration (m:ss)
1	"Naame Muthalali"	P. Leela	
2	"Panicheyyaathe Vayar"	Thiruvananthapuram V. Lakshmi	
3	"Ghorakarmmamitharuthe"		
4	"Madhumaasa Chandrikayaay"	A. M. Rajah & P. Leela	03:05
5	"Daivame Karuna Saagarame"	Kozhikode Abdul Kader & Kaviyoor Revamma	
6	"Ambiliyammaava"	Thiruvananthapuram V. Lakshmi	02:11
7	"Varumo Varumo"	P. Leela	03:18
8	"Jeevithaanandam"	Kaviyoor Revamma	
9	"En Makane"	A. M. Rajah	02:57
10	"Theliyoo Nee Ponvilakke"	Kaviyoor Revamma	02:49
11	"Kaalachakram Ithu"		
12	"Madhuramadhuramee"	P. Leela	
13	"Aariro Kanmaniye"		
14	"Lokare Ithu Kettu Chintha"		
15	"Maara manam Kolla Cheytha"		
16	"Pon Makane"	A. M. Rajah, Madhavapeddi Satyam & Kaviyoor Revamma	
17	"Poovanchumee"		
18	"Vanithakalaa Kanimele"		

Tamil songs (Thanthai)

Lyrics were written by Kambadasan. Playback singers are A. M. Rajah, P. Leela, V. J. Varma, Thiruvananthapuram V. Lakshmi and Kaviyoor Revamma.

No.	Song	Singer/s	Duration (m:ss)
1	"Naame Mudalaali Namakkini"		
2	"Thozhil Seyyaamal"	Thiruvananthapuram V. Lakshmi	
3	"Kelungo Idhai"		
4	"Ilavenil Chandrikaiyaai"	A. M. Rajah & P. Leela	03:05
5	"Devaney Dheena Thayaaparaney"	V. J. Varma & P. Leela	
6	"Ambuli Maamaa Vaa"	Thiruvananthapuram V. Lakshmi	02:11
7	"Paaraayi Kalaimaanin"	P. Leela	03:18
8	"Ninaive Ninaive Nenjam"	Kaviyoor Revamma	
9	"Chinnagnchiru Paingiliye"	A. M. Rajah	02:57
10	"Chudar Vidu Pon Vilakke"	Kaviyoor Revamma	02:49
11	"Sutrich Chendridum"		
12	"Inbam Inbame"	P. Leela	

== Reception ==
B. Vijaykumar of The Hindu wrote, "Thikkurissi's outstanding performance was one of the highpoints of the film."
