= Visappinte Vili =

- Malayalam poster
- Directed by: K. J. Mohan Rao
- Written by: Muthukulam Raghavan Pillai
- Produced by: Kunchacko; K. V. Koshi
- Starring: Prem Nazir; Thikkurissy Sukumaran Nair; Kumari Thankam; Pankajavalli; Nanukuttan; Mathappan; S. P. Pillai; Baby Girija; Sasikumar; Adoor Pankajam
- Cinematography: E. R. Cooper
- Edited by: S. Williams
- Music by: P. S. Divakar
- Production company: K&K Combines
- Release date: August 22, 1952
- Country: India
- Language: Malayalam

Visappinte Vili (transl. Call of hunger) is a 1952 Indian Malayalam-language drama film directed by K. J. Mohan Rao and produced by Kunchacko and K. V. Koshi under the banner of K&K Combines. It stars Prem Nazir, Thikkurissy Sukumaran Nair, Kumari Thankam, Pankajavalli, Nanukuttan, Mathappan, S. P. Pillai and Baby Girija.

It was the second film in the career of Prem Nazir. It was on the sets of this film that he was renamed Prem Nazir by Thikkurussi Nair. He was credited as Abdul Khader in his debut film Marumakal. Visappinte Vili became the break in his career. Made on a low budget, the film became the highest-grossing Malayalam film of the year. Out of the 10 other Malayalam releases in 1952, only Amma enjoyed success.

== Cast ==
- Prem Nazir
- Thikkurissy Sukumaran Nair
- Kumari Thankam
- Pankajavalli
- Nanukuttan
- Mathappan
- S. P. Pillai
- Baby Girija
- Sasikumar
- Adoor Pankajam

== Soundtrack ==
Malayalam

Lyrics were penned by Abhayadev. Playback singers are A. M. Rajah, T. A. Mothi, Jose Prakash, P. Leela, Jikki & Kaviyoor Revamma.

No.	Song	Singer/s	Lyricist	Duration (m:ss)
1	"Mohiniye Ennaathma"	A. M. Rajah & P. Leela	Abhayadev	03:06
2	"Karayaathennomanakkunje"	Kaviyoor Revamma	Abhayadev	02:48
3	"Paavana Hridayam"	A. M. Rajah	Abhayadev	02:27
4	"Malaranikkaadukal Thingi Vinngi"	A. M. Rajah, Jose Prakash, Kaviyoor Revamma & P. Leela	Abhayadev	05:55
5	"Kulirekidunna Katte"	A. M. Rajah & Kaviyoor Revamma	Abhayadev	02:42
6	"Chinthayil Neerunna"	Jose Prakash & Kaviyoor Revamma	Abhayadev	03:03
7	"Ha Ha Jayichu Poyi Njan "	Jikki	Abhayadev	02:25
8	"Poyithu Kaalam"		Abhayadev	
9	"Amma Aarineeyalambham"		Abhayadev	
10	"Sakhiyaarodum"	T. A. Mothi & P. Leela	Abhayadev	
11	"Nithya Sundara Swargam [Swargavaathil Dance]"		Abhayadev	
12	"Unnatha Nilayil"	A. M. Rajah	Abhayadev	

Tamil

Lyrics were penned by Kambadasan, Annal Thango and Paa. Adhimoolam. Playback singers are A. M. Rajah, Madhavapeddi Satyam, P. Leela and Kaviyoor Revamma.

No.	Song	Singer/s	Lyricist	Duration (m:ss)
1	"Mohiniye En Mohiniye"	A. M. Rajah & P. Leela	Kambadasan	03:06
2	"Azhuvaadhe En Chella Kanney"	Kaviyoor Revamma	Paa. Adhimoolam	02:48
3	"Thooya Iru Manam Sidhainthu"	A. M. Rajah	Paa. Adhimoolam	02:27
4	"Poo Nirai Maamara Cholai"	A. M. Rajah, Madhavapeddi Satyam, Kaviyoor Revamma & P. Leela	Paa. Adhimoolam	05:55
5	"Nee Chenru Odhu Kaatrey"	A. M. Rajah & Kaviyoor Revamma	Paa. Adhimoolam	02:42
6	"Thollai Tharum Vaazhvil"	A. M. Rajah & Kaviyoor Revamma	Annal Thango	03:03
7	"Naane Kalaiyil Therinen"	P. Leela	Annal Thango	02:25
8	"Inbam Tharum Kalai Paadi"	Madhavapeddi Satyam	Annal Thango	
9	"Thaaye Paaril Thunai Ini Yaro"		Annal Thango	
10	"Ilavenil Chandrikaiyaai"	A. M. Rajah & P. Leela		

== Critical reception ==
Cynic of Mathrubhumi wrote, "Prem Nazir's perfect facial expression and uncluttered speech style is a special merit. The face of this young man has not lost its charm, and if he matures and gains more manhood, Prem Nazir may become one of the most important actors in Malayalam cinema." The film ran for 50 days in 7 release centers.

== Remake ==
The film was remade in Tamil as Pasiyin Kodumai. The Tamil version was not well received and was dubbed in Telugu as Aakali (1952).
