= Ellam Inba Mayam =

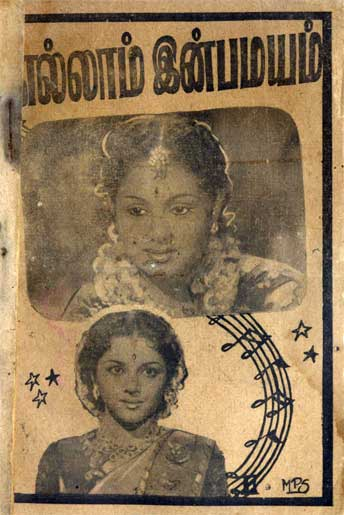
- Film poster
- Directed by: Jitten Banerji
- Screenplay by: Nagarcoil Padmanabhan (dialogues)
- Story by: R. Padmanaban
- Produced by: R. Padmanaban
- Starring: T. R. Ramachandran; K. A. Thangavelu; Ragini; Rajasulochana
- Cinematography: Kumaradevan
- Edited by: Narayanan; B. Kandaswamy
- Music by: Ghantasala
- Production company: P. N. D. Productions
- Distributed by: Narayanan Company
- Release date: 1 April 1955
- Country: India
- Language: Tamil

Ellam Inba Mayam (transl. Happily ever after) is a 1955 Indian Tamil-language drama film directed by Jitten Banerji. The film stars T. R. Ramachandran, K. A. Thangavelu, Ragini and Rajasulochana. It was released on 1 April 1955.

== Cast ==
List compiled from the films song book

Male Cast

- T. R. Ramachandran as Ganesh
- K. A. Thangavelu as Sambandam
- T. K. Ramachandran as Rathnam
- Friend Ramasamy as Chakrapani
- T. N. Sivathanu as Govindara
- N. S. Narayana Pillai as Neelakantan
- M. N. Krishnan as Ramu
- M. S. Karuppaiya as Anamalai
- V. P. S. Mani as Tharumalingam
- Krishnamoorthi as Muthu

Female cast

- Lalitha, Padmini as Guest artistes
- Ragini as Bhanu
- Rajasulochana as Vasantha
- Lakshmiprabha as Bhagyam
- K. N. Kamalam as Thripuram
- Dhanam as Seetha

== Soundtrack ==
Music was composed by Ghantasala.

Song	Singer/s	Lyricist
"Ellam Inba Mayam"	Ghantasala	Kuyilan
"Singaara Sangeethame"	P. Leela	K. P. Kamatchisundaram
"Ulage Samaadhaana Aalamaram"	P. Leela	Kuyilan
"Kannai Parikkum Vannam"	A. M. Rajah & P. Leela	V. Seetharaman
"Kaavi Kattave Vazhithanai Kaattum"	A. M. Rajah & Group	Thanjai N. Ramaiah Dass
"Vande Nee Vaa Vaa"	A. G. Rathnamala	Kuyilan
"Haa Haa Vaazhve Ullaasame"	P. Leela	V. Seetharaman
"Oli Thandha Chudar Ponadhe"	P. Leela	Kuyilan
