= Sobha (1958 film) =

- Poster
- Directed by: Kamalakara Kameswara Rao
- Written by: D. V. Narasa Raju (dialogues)
- Screenplay by: Kamalakara Kameswara Rao
- Story by: Shums Lakhnavi
- Based on: Dulari (1949)
- Produced by: Ponnaluri brothers
- Starring: N. T. Rama Rao; Anjali Devi
- Cinematography: Annayya
- Edited by: N. C. Rajan
- Music by: A. M. Rajah
- Production company: Sri Lakshmi Prasanna Pictures
- Release date: 1 May 1958
- Running time: 152 mins
- Country: India
- Language: Telugu

Sobha is a 1958 Indian Telugu-language drama film directed by Kamalakara Kameswara Rao. It stars N. T. Rama Rao, Anjali Devi. The film was produced by Ponnaluri Brothers under the Sri Lakshmi Prasanna Pictures banner. Music was composed by A. M. Rajah in his debut. Sobha was a remake of the Hindi film Dulari (1949). The film was recorded as a Hit at the box office.

== Cast ==
- N. T. Rama Rao as Raja
- Anjali Devi as Sobha / Rani
- Relangi as Sankaram
- Ramana Reddy as Sambhu
- Mukkamala as Lala
- Dr. Sivaramakrishnayya as Sardar
- Rajasulochana as Kasthuri
- Hemalatha as Seetamma
- Venkumamba as Nagamma
- Vijayalakshmi as Raja's mother
- Raavi Kondala Rao

== Soundtrack ==
Sobha

Film score by A. M. Rajah
- Released: 1958
- Genre: Soundtrack
- Producer: A. M. Rajah

Music was composed by A. M. Rajah. Lyrics were written by P. Vasanth Kumar Reddy. Music released by Audio Company.

S. No.	Song title	Singers	length
1	"Oho Ee Sandevela"	S. Janaki	4:12
2	"Yeelamaavi Thotalona"	Jikki	3:45
3	"Raave Raave Jaabili"	Jikki	2:26
4	"Ee Nela Reyi"	K. Rani	2:56
5	"Andala Seemalo"	A. M. Rajah, Jikki	
6	"Le Le Le"	J. V. Raghavulu, S. Janaki	
7	"Andalu Chindu Tara"	A. M. Rajah, Jikki	3:11
8	"Velugeleni Eelokana"	J. V. Raghavulu, Jikki	4:14
9	"Anandamanta Nee Rayamenani"	A. M. Rajah, Jikki	

== Box office ==
Sobha fared reasonably well at the box office and celebrated a 100-day run at Vijayawada.
