= Ezhayin Aasthi =

- Directed by: D. L. Ramachandar
- Written by: Udhayakumar; Guhan; V. N. Sambandham
- Story by: D. L. Ramachandar
- Produced by: H. M. Reddy
- Starring: Sowcar Janaki; Gummadi; Rajnala; Jaggayya
- Cinematography: Annayya
- Edited by: S. B. N. Krishna
- Music by: T. A. Kalyanam; G. Natarajan
- Production company: Rohini Pictures
- Release date: 14 April 1955
- Running time: 170 minutes
- Country: India
- Languages: Tamil; Telugu

Ezhaiyin Aasthi (transl. Property of the poor) is a 1955 Indian Tamil-language film directed by D. L. Ramachandar. The film stars Sowcar Janaki and Gummadi. It was also made in Telugu with the title Beedhala Aasthi. The Tamil version was released on 14 April 1955.

== Cast ==
List adapted from the database of Film News Anandan

Male cast

- Gummadi
- Rajnala
- Jaggayya
- Sayeeram

Female cast

- Sowcar Janaki
- Baby Kanchana
- Suryakantham
- Chandrakumari

== Production ==
The film was produced by H. M. Reddy and directed by D. L. Ramachandar who also wrote the story. Dialogues were written by Udhayakumar, Guhan and V. N. Sambandham. Annayya was in charge of cinematography while S. B. N. Krishna handled the editing. L. V. Manthra was in charge of Art direction while Rohini, Natarajan and Chopra handled the choreography. Still photography was done by Eswara Babu. The film was also made in Telugu with the title Beedhala Aasthi.

== Soundtrack ==
Music was composed by T. A. Kalyanam and G. Natarajan while the lyrics were written by Guhan.

Song	Singer/s	Length
"Ambuli Maamaa Ambuli Maamaa"		
"Subha Mangalam Pongidum Naale"	A. P. Komala	
"Kalyanam Seydhu Kolvaene"		
"Ezhil Jyothi Vaanavaa"	A. M. Rajah & Rohini	03:25
"En Kannaalaa Naan Unnai Adaindhene"	Rohini	
"Inbam Vandhenai Naadudhe"		
"Kanavenoh Veenaanadhe"		
"Annaiyai Pole Munnari Deivam"	A. M. Rajah	
