= Genova (1953 film) =

1953 Indian film

- Poster of the Tamil version
- Directed by: F. Nagoor
- Written by: Swami Brahmavruthan; Suratha (Tamil); Elangovan (Tamil); Nedumaran (Tamil)
- Story by: Swami Brahmavruthan
- Produced by: T.L. Mathew and E. P. Eppan
- Starring: M. G. Ramachandran; B. S. Saroja; P. S. Veerappa
- Cinematography: Jithan Banerjee; G. Vittal Rao
- Edited by: N. B. Nataraja Mudaliar
- Music by: M. S. Viswanathan; M. S. Gnanamani; T. A. Kalyanam
- Production company: Chandra Pictures
- Release dates: 17 April 1953 (Malayalam); 5 June 1953 (Tamil)
- Country: India
- Languages: Malayalam; Tamil

Genova is a 1953 Indian war romance film, directed by F. Nagoor and produced by T. L. Mathew and E. P. Eppan. The film stars M. G. Ramachandran, B. S. Saroja and P. S. Veerappa. It was filmed simultaneously in Malayalam and Tamil, with the Malayalam version releasing on 17 April 1953 and the Tamil version some two months later.

== Cast ==
Actor (Malayalam)	Actor (Tamil)	Role
M. G. Ramachandran (voice dubbed by Sebastian Kunjukunju Bhagavathar in Malayalam)		King Cipresso
B. S. Saroja		Princess Genova
Alleppey Vincent	P. S. Veerappa	Minister Golo
M. G. Chakrapani		General Annas
T. S. Durairaj		Arokiyam (in Tamil)

=== Malayalam cast ===
- S. P. Pillai

== Soundtrack ==
Music was composed by M. S. Viswanathan, M. S. Gnanamani and T. A. Kalyanam and lyrics were written by Suratha, Ramani and Rajamani.

=== Tamil track list ===
Songs	Singers	Length (m:ss)
"Thunai Neeye Dheva Thaaye"	P. Leela	03:04
"Maalayin Velai"		03:12
"Kannukkul Minnal"	A. M. Rajah, P. Leela	05:35
"Parithabam Illaiya"		04:27
"Kadhal Vaazhvil Naane"	A. M. Rajah, P. Leela	03:04
"Aasai Alai Modhudhe"	A. M. Rajah, P. Leela	03:31
"Seitha Paavathinalae .. Anaadaiyaippolavae Aaneney "	A. M. Rajah	03:24
"Inbam Thollaiyo"		03:17
"Kanne Pinnal"		02:29
"Aanandham Aanandham"	A. P. Komala	
"Bam Bam Bama Silambam"		
