= Bhakta Vijaya =

Bhaktha Vijaya ಭಕ್ತ ವಿಜಯ
- Directed by: Aruru Pattabhi
- Produced by: P. K. Janardhan
- Starring: Rajkumar; Pandari Bai
- Cinematography: R. Sampath
- Edited by: M. Thathayya
- Music by: Shyam-Aathmanath
- Distributed by: Jagannath Productions
- Release date: 1956
- Running time: 149 minutes
- Country: India
- Language: Kannada

Bhaktha Vijaya is a 1956 Indian Kannada language film directed by Aruru Pattabhi. The film stars Rajkumar and Pandari Bai.

At the 4th National Film Awards, the film was awarded the Best Feature Film in Kannada (Certificate of Merit).

Rajkumar plays the role of Santhoba, a devotee of Lord Vittala. The theme of the movie is how God sets several tests and tribulations upon his devotee, who ultimately triumphs only to become a much hardened devotee. The movie was dubbed in Telugu as Bhaktha Vijayam.

== Overview ==
Santhoba, a prideful zamindar, is offended when Saint Tukaram refuses to visit his house and give him blessings. However, when Santhoba's wife falls gravely ill, things take a dramatic turn.

== Plot ==
Santhoba Pavar was a big zamindar of Ranjan. He was proud of his wealth which he had acquired through cruel and ruthless means from his poor tenants and was particular about his self-respect and status. Hema was his loving wife and his mother was Mithra Bai. He had a very faithful servant named Giddya.

In the same village, Ram Bhatta and Amba a Brahmin couple. Outwardly would quarrel between themselves, but were a very loving couple.

Saint Tukaram visits their village. The whole village rose to a man to hear his Bhajans.

Santhoba's mother Mithra Bai expressed to her son her desire to receive the blessings of Tukaram. Santhoba promised to call the saint home. Giddya, the servant, was sent to the temple where Tukaram was staying. Tukaram expressed his inability to comply with the request of Santhoba. Santhoba went himself to the saint to invite him to his house, and for this gesture, he would give him any amount of gold... Tukaram sent him back, saying that gold had no value for him. This wounded Santhoba's vanity. Then, Santhoba's wife was seriously ill. Her life was in danger. The family Vaidya was sent for and he expressed his helplessness. Santhoba offered all his wealth if only it could save his wife. The dying wife expressed a desire to have a darshan and blessings of Tukaram before her death. Prestige doesn't stand in the way of Santhoba now. To save the life of his loving wife he was prepared to do anything. He runs to Tukaram. Much to the surprise of Santhoba, Tukaram comes along with Santhoba to see Hema and blesses her. By the grace of Tukaram, Hema recovers and with great humility accepts the blessings of Tukaram. It is the happiest and greatest moment in the family of Santhoba; But to Santhoba...?

== Cast ==
- Rajkumar as Santhoba Pavar
- Pandari Bai as Hema
- Mynavathi
- Dikki Madhava Rao
- Hanumanthachar
- Ramadevi
- H. R. Shastry
- Ganapathi Bhat
- Siddaiah Swamy
- Advani Lakshmi Devi

== Soundtrack ==
The film's soundtrack was composed by Shyam-Aathmanath.

| Track# | Song | Singer(s) | Duration |
|---|---|---|---|
| 1 | "Elli Neeniruve" | A. M. Rajah | |
| 2 | "Jaya Panduranga" | Chorus | |
| 3 | "Naradeha" | Prabakara Rao | |
| 4 | "Nodai Dayadi Ranga" | P Leela | |
| 5 | "Enu Ninnadu Embudilli" | A. M. Rajah | |
| 6 | "Vittala Rakumaayi" | A. M. Rajah | |
| 7 | "Pathiseva Nija Sathige" | P Leela | |
| 8 | "Vittala Dhayava Beero" | A. M. Rajah | |
| 9 | "Rangavali Rangavali" | Mynavathi | |
| 10 | "Abbabba Kai Noyuthide" | | |
