= Vidivelli =

1960 film by C. V. Sridhar

- Theatrical release poster
- Directed by: C. V. Sridhar
- Written by: C. V. Sridhar
- Produced by: Sivaji Ganesan
- Starring: Sivaji Ganesan; B. Saroja Devi
- Cinematography: A. Vincent
- Edited by: N. M. Shankar
- Music by: A. M. Rajah
- Production company: Prabhuram Pictures
- Distributed by: Sivaji Films
- Release date: 31 December 1960
- Running time: 126 minutes
- Country: India
- Language: Tamil

Vidivelli (transl. The Morning Star) is a 1960 Indian Tamil-language film written and directed by C. V. Sridhar. The film stars Sivaji Ganesan, B. Saroja Devi and M. N. Rajam; Ganesan also produced it under Prabhuram Pictures, a subsidiary of his own company Sivaji Films. The film focuses on a brother who steals a diamond necklace for his sister's happy life, but the necklace itself becomes a problem. The rest of the story deals with what is the secret of the necklace and how the brother solves this puzzle.

Vidivelli was released on 31 December 1960. The film was a critical and commercial success, running for over 100 days in theatres.

== Plot ==
Chandru has a sister Meena who is married to Ravi. But her in-laws insist that she cannot join her husband unless she brings a diamond necklace along. Chandru steals a diamond necklace with a locket and then Meena joins her husband. He and his mother move to Madras, where the former obtains employment. Chandru falls in love with his boss's daughter Chitra. One day, the necklace falls down and the locket opens, revealing the photograph of a man. Ravi and his family want to know who he is. Meena says she has never seen him before. But suspecting the worst, she is sent back to her old home.

After Chandru saves his boss from a large loss, the boss gives him a large sum of money in gratitude. Chandru purchases another necklace using that money and Meena goes back to her husband. However, Chandru's boss dismisses him to keep him away from Chitra. Chandru surrenders to the police station for the theft. He later realises that the earlier necklace belongs to Chitra, and the man in the locket is her brother who died during a war. However, Chitra's father denies ever having had a son. The rest of the film deals with how the puzzle is solved.

== Cast ==
Male cast

- Sivaji Ganesan as Chandru
- S. V. Ranga Rao as the boss
- Balaji as Ravi
- T. R. Ramachandran as Babu
- M. R. Santhanam as Devit

Female cast

- B. Saroja Devi as Chithra
- M. N. Rajam as Meena
- Santha Kumari as Chandru's mother
- Padmini Priyadarshini as Rosie

== Production ==
In 1953, M. G. Ramachandran intended to produce a film titled Vidivelli with M. Karunanidhi writing; however, the project was dropped after Karunanidhi's arrest for participating in the Kallakudi demonstration that year. The title was later used for an unrelated film written and directed by C. V. Sridhar and produced by Sivaji Ganesan under Prabhuram Pictures, a subsidiary of his company Sivaji Films. Cinematography was handled by A. Vincent, editing by N. M. Shankar, and art direction by Ganga.

== Soundtrack ==
The soundtrack was composed by A. M. Rajah.

Track listing
No.	Title	Lyrics	Singer(s)	Length
1.	"Idai Kai Irandil Aadum"	Kannadasan	A. M. Rajah, P. Susheela	03:20
2.	"Koduthu Paar"	A. Maruthakasi	A. M. Rajah, P. Susheela, Thiruchi Loganathan, Jikki	03:29
3.	"Naan Vaazhndhadhum"	Kannadasan	Jikki	03:11
4.	"Ninaithaal Inikkum"	A. Maruthakasi	Jikki	02:40
5.	"Pannodu Pirandhadhu"	Kannadasan	P. B. Sreenivas, Jikki	03:48
6.	"Aadamal Aadugiren"	A. Maruthakasi	P. Susheela	04:05
7.	"Ennaalum" (Pathos)	A. Maruthakasi	P. Susheela	03:21
8.	"Ennaalum Vaazhviley" (Happy)	A. Maruthakasi	P. Susheela	04:00
9.	"Kaaru Savarijhoru"	Ku. Ma. Balasubramanian	Jikki, Thiruchi Loganathan	03:33
Total length:				31:27

== Release and reception ==
Vidivelli was released on 31 December 1960. In a review published on 8 January 1961, the critic from The Indian Express praised the performances of the cast, particularly Ganesan, Saroja Devi, Balaji and Santhakumari, and Vincent's cinematography. Kalki also appreciated the film for various aspects, including the story, direction and cast performances. The film was a critical and commercial success, running for over 100 days in theatres.
