= Aadi Perukku (film) =

1962 film

- Theatrical release poster
- Directed by: K. Shankar
- Written by: Makkalanban; Javar Seetharaman
- Produced by: K. Madhanagopal
- Starring: Gemini Ganesan; B. Saroja Devi; Devika
- Cinematography: Thambu
- Edited by: K. Shankar; K. Neelakandan
- Music by: A. M. Rajah
- Production company: Madhan Theatres
- Release date: 2 August 1962
- Country: India
- Language: Tamil

Aadi Perukku ( also spelt Aadipperukku) is a 1962 Indian Tamil-language romance film edited and directed by K. Shankar. The film stars Gemini Ganesan, B. Saroja Devi and Devika, while M. V. Rajamma and K. D. Santhanam play supporting roles. It was released on 2 August 1962, and failed at the box office.

== Plot ==
Padma lives with her brother, a harbour worker, and their widowed mother. The family finds refuge in the house of Raja, a poet. Padma's brother dies in an accident.

== Cast ==
Male cast

- Gemini Ganesh as Raja & Philanthropist Krishnan
- Chandrababu as Biscuit
- K. D. Santhanam as Ramalingam
- P. D. Sambandam as Koithan Pillai
- Karikol Raju
- G. K. Pillai
- S. G. Eswaran as Sivanandam
- C. V. V. Panthulu as Well wisher
- Mahalingam as Sundaram
- R. Shankaran
- Gemini Balu
- Wahab Kashmiri

Female cast

- B. Saroja Devi as Padma
- Devika as Latha
- M. V. Rajamma as Parvathi
- K. V. Shanthi as Thangam
- C. K. Saraswathi as Mangalam
- Vidyavathi as Principal
- Devaki as Female Beggar

Supporting cast

- G. V. Sharma, V. P. Natarajan

== Production ==
The film shares its name with Aadi Perukku, a festival in Tamil Nadu which pays tribute to water's life-sustaining properties. Despite that, the festival is not referenced anywhere onscreen except the song "Annaiyin Arule Vaa", near the end of which Gemini Ganesan's character is shown singing the last two lines as a tribute to the festival. Shooting took place at the now non-existent Majestic Studios.

== Soundtrack ==
The soundtrack was composed by A. M. Rajah.

Track listing
No.	Title	Lyrics	Singer(s)	Length
1.	"Annaiyin Arule Vaa"	Kothamangalam Subbu	Sirkazhi Govindarajan	3:32
2.	"Idhuthaan Ulagamaa"	Kannadasan	P. Susheela	3:24
3.	"Kannaale Pesum"	K. D. Santhanam	P. Susheela	3:12
4.	"Kannizhanda Manidhar"	Kannadasan	A. M. Raja, P. Susheela	3:12
5.	"Kaaveri Oram"	K. D. Santhanam	P. Susheela	3:16
6.	"Pengal Illaatha"	Kothamangalam Subbu	A. M. Raja, P. Susheela	6:44
7.	"Puriyaathu"	Suratha	P. B. Sreenivas	4:44
8.	"Thanimaiyile Inimai" (duet)	K. D. Santhanam	A. M. Raja, P. Susheela	3:21
9.	"Thanimaiyile Inimai" (male)	K. D. Santhanam	A. M. Raja	3:31
Total length:				33:36

== Release and reception ==
Aadi Perukku was released on 2 August 1962. On 10 August, The Indian Express called it "another insipid medley of romance, comedy and melodrama [...] A story of unfulfilled love, the film is heavily padded with the usual quantum of songs, dances and other box office gimmicks." The reviewer however praised the performances of the cast members. Kanthan of Kalki lauded Saroja Devi's performance, but said she was the only reason to watch the film just once. According to historian Randor Guy, the film did not succeed commercially because of the "somewhat predictable storyline, the many deaths and the lack of significance of the title".
