= Puthradharmam =

- Directed by: Vimalkumar
- Written by: Thikkurissy Sukumaran Nair
- Screenplay by: Thikkurissy Sukumaran Nair
- Produced by: K. V. Koshy
- Starring: Thikkurissy Sukumaran Nair, Lakshmi Bai
- Cinematography: P. B. Mani
- Edited by: K. D. George
- Music by: P. S. Divakar
- Distributed by: Excel Release
- Release date: 9 September 1954
- Country: India
- Language: Malayalam

Puthradharmam is a 1954 Indian Malayalam-language film, directed by Vimalkumar and produced by K. V. Koshy. The film stars Anilkumar and T. R. Omana. Its musical score was penned by P. S. Divakar.

The film was remade in Tamil as Nalla Penmani. It was released 1954.

== Cast ==
- Anilkumar
- Jagathy N. K. Achari
- Thikkurissy Sukumaran Nair
- T. R. Omana
- Lakshmi Bai
- Nanukkuttan
- Bahadoor
- Veeran

== Soundtrack ==
P. S. Divakar composed the music for both Malayalam and Tamil versions.

Malayalam songs (Puthradharmam)

Lyrics were penned by Abhayadev. Playback singers are P. B. Sreenivas, P. Leela & Lilly Koshy.

S. No.	Song title	Singers	Lyrics	Duration (mm:ss)
1	"Amminikkuttan Valarnnaal"	Lilly Koshy	Abhayadev	
2	"Nalloru Paattu Nee Cholli Tharumo"	Lilly Koshy	Abhayadev	
3	"Devi Devi"	P. Leela	Abhayadev	
4	"Nin Kanivaanee"		Abhayadev	
5	"Leelaarasamaya"		Abhayadev	
6	"Amminikkuttan"		Abhayadev	
7	"Koottinu Varumo"		Abhayadev	
8	"Kezhaathe Thozhee"		Abhayadev	

Tamil songs (Nalla Penmani)

Lyrics were penned by Kambadasan & A. S. Rajagopal. Playback singers are A. M. Rajah, R. Balasaraswathi Devi, A. P. Komala & Kumari Kamini.

S. No.	Song title	Singers	Lyrics	Duration (mm:ss)
1	"Anbe Nee Kanne Valarnthaal Petra"	R. Balasaraswathi Devi	Kambadasan	
2	"Nalloru Paattu Nee Solluvaaai Ippo"	Kumari Kamini	Kambadasan	
3	"Dhevi Dhevi Agathi En Vinai"	R. Balasaraswathi Devi	A. S. Rajagopal	
4	"Nin Dhayavaale En Mqana Thuyaram"	R. Balasaraswathi Devi	A. S. Rajagopal	
5	"Unezhi Madhiyo"	A. M. Rajah	A. S. Rajagopal	
6	"Anbe Nee Kanne Valarnthaal Petra"	A. M. Rajah & R. Balasaraswathi Devi	A. S. Rajagopal	
7	"Soraadhe Nenje Inbamo"	A. M. Rajah	A. S. Rajagopal	
8	"Vaadi Ularumo Vaazhkai Malarumo"	R. Balasaraswathi Devi	Kambadasan	
9	"Anuraaga Kanavu Endhan Paarvaiyaal"	A. P. Komala	A. S. Rajagopal	
10	"Kaadhal Nilaimaiyai Paarthidume"	A. P. Komala	A. S. Rajagopal	
11	"Vaazhkaiyo Vedu Dhooram"	A. M. Rajah	A. S. Rajagopal	
