= Aayisha =

1964 film

- Directed by: Kunchacko
- Written by: Udaya; P. K. Sarangapani (dialogues)
- Screenplay by: P. K. Sarangapani
- Produced by: M. Kunchacko
- Starring: Prem Nazir; Sathyan; Sheela; Sasirekha
- Cinematography: C. J. Mohan
- Music by: R. K. Shekhar
- Production company: Udaya
- Distributed by: Udaya
- Release date: 5 December 1964
- Country: India
- Language: Malayalam

Aayisha is a 1964 Indian Malayalam-language film, directed and produced by Kunchacko. The film stars Prem Nazir, Sathyan, Sheela and Sasirekha. The film had musical score by R. K. Shekhar.

== Cast ==
- Prem Nazir as Basheer
- Sathyan as Abubacker Sahib
- Sheela as Amina
- Sasirekha as Ayisha
- Manavalan Joseph as Haque
- Sankaradi as Rehman
- Jijo as Alimon
- Adoor Pankajam as Beeyaathu
- Bahadoor as Moideen
- K. S. Gopinath as Abu Sayyad
- Nanukkuttan as Uppaappa
- Pankajavalli as Paathumma
- S. P. Pillai as Abdhu
- Vijaya Kumari as Suhara

== Soundtrack ==
The music was composed by R. K. Shekhar and the lyrics were written by Vayalar Ramavarma and Moinkutty Vaidyar.

No.	Song	Singers	Lyrics	Length (m:ss)
1	"Akkaanum" (Badarul Muneer)	P. Susheela, A. M. Rajah	Vayalar Ramavarma	
2	"Anganeyangane" (Badarul Muneer)	P. Susheela, A. M. Rajah	Vayalar Ramavarma	
3	"Cheelunnon"	K. J. Yesudas	Moinkutty Vaidyar	
4	"Idirakkanni"	Jikki	Moinkutty Vaidyar	
5	"Manoraajyathu"	P. Susheela, A. M. Rajah, Mehboob	Vayalar Ramavarma	
6	"Muthaane Ente Muthaane"	P. Susheela, A. M. Rajah	Vayalar Ramavarma	
7	"Muthaane Muthaane" (Sad)	P. Susheela	Vayalar Ramavarma	
8	"Poomakalaane" (Badarul Muneer)	P. Susheela, A. M. Rajah, Chorus	Moinkutty Vaidyar	
9	"Rajakumari" (Badarul Muneer)	P. Susheela, A. M. Rajah, Mehboob	Vayalar Ramavarma	
10	"Shokaantha Jeevitha"	K. J. Yesudas	Vayalar Ramavarma	
11	"Swarnavarnnathattamitta"	P. Leela, Chorus	Vayalar Ramavarma	
12	"Yaathrakkaara Povuka"	P. B. Sreenivas	Vayalar Ramavarma	
