= Rebecca (1963 film) =

1963 film by Kunchacko

- Directed by: Kunchacko
- Written by: Udaya; Thoppil Bhasi (dialogues)
- Produced by: M. Kunchacko
- Starring: Sathyan; Rajasri; B. S. Saroja
- Music by: K. Raghavan
- Production company: Excel Productions
- Release date: 21 December 1963
- Country: India
- Language: Malayalam

Rebecca is a 1963 Indian Malayalam-language film, directed and produced by Kunchacko. The film stars Sathyan, Rajasri and B. S. Saroja.

== Cast ==
- Sathyan as Johny
- Rajasree as Rebecca
- Boban Kunchacko
- Jijo
- Bahadoor as Lazer
- B. S. Saroja
- Kottayam Chellappan as Mathew
- Pala Thankam as Maria
- S. J. Dev
- Gangadharan Nair

== Soundtrack ==
The music was composed by K. Raghavan and the lyrics were written by Vayalar Ramavarma.

No.	Song	Singers	Lyrics	Length (m:ss)
1	"Aakashathile Kuruvikal"	K. J. Yesudas	Vayalar Ramavarma	
2	"Baliyallaa"	P. B. Sreenivas	Vayalar Ramavarma	
3	"Iniyoru Jananamundo"	P. B. Sreenivas	Vayalar Ramavarma	
4	"Kilivaathilil Muttivilichathu"	P. Susheela, A. M. Rajah	Vayalar Ramavarma	
5	"Kothikkalle Kothikkalle"	S. Janaki	Vayalar Ramavarma	
6	"Maanathe Ezhunilamaalikayil"	A. M. Rajah, Jikki	Vayalar Ramavarma	
7	"Muzhangee Muzhangee"	P. B. Sreenivas	Vayalar Ramavarma	
8	"Nithyasahaaya Naadha" (Bit)	P. B. Sreenivas	Vayalar Ramavarma	
9	"Thaalee Peelee Kaadukalil"	P. Susheela	Vayalar Ramavarma	
10	"Yarushalemin Naayakane"	P. Leela	Vayalar Ramavarma	
