= Ulagam =

- Theatrical release poster
- Directed by: L. S. Ramachandran; M. H. M. Moonas (Supervision)
- Screenplay by: M. H. M. Moonas
- Story by: Mrs. C. P. Moonas
- Produced by: M. H. M. Moonas
- Starring: V. Nagayya; M. V. Rajamma; P. S. Veerappa; M. S. Draupathi
- Cinematography: R. R. Chandran; Operative Cameraman: K. M. Govindan; Art: V. M. Vardhookar
- Edited by: L. S. Ramachandran
- Music by: M. S. Gnanamani
- Production company: Society Pictures
- Release date: 10 July 1953
- Running time: 3 hrs. 9 mins. (17013 ft.)
- Country: India
- Language: Tamil

Ulagam (transl. The World) is a 1953 Indian Tamil-language film directed by L. S. Ramachandran. The film stars V. Nagayya and M. V. Rajamma.

== Plot ==
The story spans three generations. Sabapathy, an average person, marries the beautiful Meena. Sabapathy gains wealth and status by luck. The couple have two sons – Shankar and Mohan. Shankar marries Padma as per his parents' wishes. Mohan is studying in a college. A girl student, Lalitha loves him, but he does not reciprocate her feelings. Lalitha goes abroad for studies to become a barrister. Leela is Mohan's cousin. She has returned from South Africa and is studying medicine. Mohan loves her. Leela is apprehensive in the beginning, but later on accepts his love. She becomes pregnant before marriage. Lalitha returns as a Barrister. She becomes aware of the love between Mohan and Leela. She tries several ways to separate them and get Mohan for herself. However, she fails in all her attempts and finally dies in a car accident. Leela's pregnancy is aborted due to shock. Mohan and Leela get married. Mohan goes to America for higher studies. In the meantime, Shankar and Padma beget two children – Chandar and Swarna. Padma dies when Chandar is 20 and Swarna is 16. Shankar wants to marry a poor girl Prema as his second wife. But Chandar opposes his father marrying a second time. Prema tries to kill herself by jumping into the ocean. Chandar, without knowing that she is the girl his father intends to marry, rescues her and brings her for treatment to Leela, who has become a doctor now. Chandar's blood is transfused to Prema. Chandar falls in love with Prema. A police inspector Govindasamy comes for an inquiry and gets attracted by Prema's beauty. But Prema refuses him. He files a case against Prema for attempted suicide. Chandar does not want to live with his father. He stays with Leela. When Mohan returns from America, Govindasamy tries to poison his mind creating false stories about Chandar and Leela. Chandar is now forced to leave Leela's home also. He goes to Prema's house and learns that she is the one his father was to marry. So, he gets upset. The police inspector Govindasamy charges Chandar as the person who urged Prema to commit suicide. Govindasamy arrests Chandar and imprisons him.

== Cast ==
The following lists are compiled from The Hindu article, and from the song book.

Male Cast

- V. Nagayya as Sabapathy
- T. E. Varadan as Shankar
- P. S. Veerappa as Mohan
- T. K. Bhagavathi as Chandar
- S. M. Kumaresan as Kumar
- Pulimoottai Ramasami as Ramasami
- M. R. Saminathan as Saminathan
- E. R. Sahadevan as Devindran
- K. Duraisami as Duraisami
- M. V. Mani as Govindasamy
- K. Sayeeram as Ram
- T. K. Sampangi as Minister

Folk Dance

- Kumari Kamala

Bharatanatyam

- Lalitha-Padmini

Male Cast (continued)

- T. P. Ponnusami Pillai as Worker
- G. V. Sharma as Shop Owner
- Nandaram as Beggar
- M. S. Karuppaiah as Inspector
- Jayaram as Jayaram
- Kunchithapadam Pillai as Manohar
- T. V. Sethuraman as Sethu
- V. T. Kalyanam as Kalyanam
- Raju as Young Chandar
- S. V. Shanmugam as Venkat
- Pottai Krishnamoorthi as Krishna
- S. Peer Mohamed as Mohamed

Wrestling

- Dara Singh-Ali Riza Bey
- Wong Buck Lee (referee)

Female Cast

- M. V. Rajamma as Meena
- P. K. Saraswathi as Padma
- M. S. Draupathi as Lalitha
- T. R. Rajani as Leela
- M. Lakshmiprabha as Swarna
- N. R. Sakunthala as Prema
- C. K. Saraswathi as Saraswathi
- K. S. Angamuthu as Lakshmi
- K. Aranganayaki as Ranganayaki
- B. Saradambal as Sarada
- N. Thilakam as Thulasi
- S. Jayalakshmi Ammal as Kamala Ammal
- G. Saroja as Seetha
- Baby Lakshmi as Young Swarna

Group dance

- P. Santha Kumari, D. Saroja, N. D. Rani, G. Sundari, Prathibha, V. Saroja, T. S. Kamala, T. S. Jayanthi, M. M. Leela, N. Krishnaveni, K. Rajeswari, V. Saraswathi, Meera, K. Saroja, Sakku Bai, and Bhavani.

== Production ==
The film was produced by M. H. M. Moonas, a Sri Lankan who was resident in India. The film was also made in Telugu with the title Prapanjam. The film had a wrestling match included in it. The producer conducted a competition for which a total of ₹100,000 was offered as prize money. Six questions were asked for which, it was announced, the answers were kept in a sealed cover and deposited in the "Eastern Bank of India". The first all correct entry would get a prize of ₹10,000 – quite a big amount those days. Altogether 309 prizes were offered. Though the competition was free for all to participate, it was asked to attach the counterfoil of the ticket with each entry. However, there is no record about the results of the competition. 100 copies of the film were made simultaneously. Choreography was handled by K. K. Sinha, K. Madhavan and Jayashankar.

== Soundtrack ==
Music was composed by M. S. Gnanamani while the lyrics were penned by M. H. M. Moonas, Kavi Kunjaram, K. P. Kamakshisundaram, P. Hanumandha Rao, Kuyilan (debut) and Tamizh Oli.

Song	Singer/s	Lyricist	Duration (m:ss)
"Manam Pole Ullasamayi"			
"Azhagaana Bhoomi Thanile"	V. Nagayya		
"Kaadhalinaal Ulagame Inbamadhe"	N. L. Ganasaraswathi & Thiruchi Loganathan	Kuyilan	
"En Jeevanile"	M. L. Vasanthakumari	Kuyilan	02:09
"Puvi Vaazhvu Idho"			
"Anne Anne Enum"			
"Isai Paadi Naanume"	A. M. Rajah & P. Leela		03:25
"Indha Thallaadum Kizhathaadi"			
"Thetkathi Kallanadaa"	P. A. Periyanayaki		
"Namma Velaikku Pazhudhille"			
"Kalaiye Uyir Thunaiye"	N. L. Ganasaraswathi	Kavi Kunjaram	06:05
"Nalla Penn Pillai Kitte"			
"Thuyarutraeh Ennai Nee Enraaye"	N. Sathiyam		
"Un Kaadhalaal En Anbellaam"	A. M. Rajah & M. L. Vasanthakumari		03:10
"En Premai Rani Kaadhalinale"	A. M. Rajah & M. S. Rajeswari		02:23

== Release and reception ==
Ulagam was released on 10 July 1953. The film did not fare well at the box office. However, historian Randor Guy said the film is remembered for "the stunning star cast, prize schemes and the avalanche of publicity released by Moonas which old-timers will never forget!"
