= Bommala Pelli =

1958 film

- Theatrical release poster in Telugu
- Directed by: R. M. Krishnaswamy
- Screenplay by: Acharya Aatreya
- Produced by: M. Radhakrishnan; R. M. Krishnaswamy
- Starring: Sivaji Ganesan; Jamuna; Mynavathi
- Cinematography: C. A. Madhusudhan
- Edited by: R. M. Venugopal
- Music by: K. V. Mahadevan
- Production company: Aruna Films
- Distributed by: Subbu & Co. (Tamil)
- Release dates: 11 January 1958 (Telugu); 3 May 1958 (Tamil)
- Running time: 131 minutes
- Country: India
- Languages: Telugu; Tamil

Bommala Pelli (lit. 'Wedding of dolls'; colloquially: Fake wedding) is a 1958 Indian Telugu-language film, directed by R. M. Krishnaswamy. The film stars Sivaji Ganesan, Jamuna and Mynavathi. It was simultaneously produced in Tamil as Bommai Kalyanam.

== Plot ==
Suryam (Kannan in Tamil) is a playful teenage son of the famous lawyer Perayya (Varatharajan in Tamil) and Parvathamma (Thangam in Tamil). While playing football, he meets Radha, the daughter of a respected freedom fighter family of Simhadri (Veeramuthu in Tamil) and Seshamma (Maragatham in Tamil). Both instantly fall in love.

Perayya is a modest man, but Parvathamma is a greedy woman. Parvathamma wishes to marry off Suryam to her brother Chalamayya's (Sonachalam in Tamil) and Bhadramma's (Perundevi in Tamil) daughter Bullemma (Kannamma in Tamil) and invites them to their home. Bullemma is a naïve girl and Thimaiyya (Mannar in Tamil), Bhadramma's brother loves her. Perayya likes the simplicity of Simhadri's family and agrees to the marriage of Suryam and Radha. When Parvathamma opposes this, Perayya lies to her that Simhadri will present a large dowry. The wedding takes place.

After the wedding, Bhadramma, who is furious that Bullemma is not the bride, instigates Parvathamma to query regarding the dowry. A scuffle takes place between the two families and Parvathamma wishes to send Saroja back to her parents, but Suryam sides with Saroja and accepts her whole-heartedly. Meanwhile, Chalamayya wishes to leave home, but Bhadramma, who is in agony, decides to stay back and plans to create hatred between Parvathamma and Radha. In turn, Parvathamma tortures Saroja in every possible way, but Saroja fights back and keeps calm. Matters get worse when Perayya dies, but not before seeking a promise from Suryam not to disobey Parvathamma. Suryam and Radha's marriage life hits a roadblock. When coming to know that Parvathamma treats Saroja very badly, Simhadri steps in and takes Radha, who is driven away by both Parvathamma and Bhadramma, away to his place.

When Suryam comes back, Parvathamma and Bhadramma lie to him that Saroja had gone to her parents place along with Simhadri, without seeking their consent. That night, Saroja tries to meet Suryam, but Parvathamma would not let Saroja in. Meanwhile, Bullemma unwittingly lets know Suryam regarding this incident and Suryam goes to Simhadri's place to explain, in order to take back Radha. Simhadri spells out to Suryam clearly that Saroja would not go to Suryam's place as long as Parvathamma is there. Taking this opportunity, Parvathamma and Bhadramma force and arrange Bullemma to be married to Suryam. Observing all this, Chalamayya and Thimaiyya attempt to abduct Bullemma, but fail. To make matters worse, Parvathamma sends a letter to Saroja informing that Suryam would remarry and restricts Saroja not to interfere in Suryam's life any more.

On the engagement day, Suryam who is badly disturbed by the events, falls from the first floor of his balcony and is badly injured. Upon hearing this, Saroja rushes to Suryam's place, was stopped by Simhadri, but later consents after hearing to Radha's plea. Suryam is happy to see Saroja around, tells her not to leave him even though Parvathamma mistreats her and Saroja assures this. At this juncture, Parvathamma and Bhadramma further humiliate Simhadri to the worst, which drives him to sell his mansion to compensate with much dowry. Parvathamma tries all her best to drive Saroja away, but to no avail and she becomes violent. Saroja hides in one of the rooms, but Parvathamma tries to force open the door, when the door collapse onto Parvathamma. At the same time, Simhadri parades the dowry items from his home throughout the streets, much to the residents' dismay and reaches Suryam's place. Upon seeing all this, Bhadramma and Bullemma flee.

Parvathamma realises her error on her deathbed and seeks apology from Suryam, Saroja and Simhadri then dies. Suryam and Saroja reunite and live happily.

== Cast ==
Male cast					Female cast				
Cast (Telugu)	Cast (Tamil)	Role (Telugu)	Role (Tamil)	Ref.	Cast (Telugu)	Cast (Tamil)	Role (Telugu)	Role (Tamil)	Ref.
Sivaji Ganesan		Suryam	Kannan		Jamuna		Saroja	Radha	
V. Nagayya		Perayya	Varatharajan		Santha Kumari		Parvathamma	Thangam	
S. V. Ranga Rao		Simhadri	Veeramuthu		Mynavathi		Bullemma	Kannamma	
Ramana Reddy	Friend Ramasamy	Chalamayya	Sonachalam		Suryakantham	M. S. Sundari Bai	Bhadramma	Perundevi	
Nalla Ramamurthy	Kaka Radhakrishnan	Thimaiyya	Mannar		Rushyendramani		Seshamma	Maragatham	

Telugu

- Vangara Venkata Subbaiah as the sanyasi
- Gauripati Shastri as Somayajulu
- Y. V. Raju as Doctor
- B. V. Ramanachari as Bhima
- Bhavana Rishi as Sambhu
- Lakshmi Devi as Kamala
- Sitarammamma as Mangamma

== Soundtrack ==
The music was composed by K. V. Mahadevan.

Telugu songs

Song	Singers	Lyrics	Length
"Chitti Baava"	Pithapuram Nageswara Rao & Swarnalatha	Acharya Aatreya	03:27
"Raavo Kanaraavo"	A. M. Rajah & Jikki	Sri Sri	02:29
"Avunaa Idhi Thudiavunaa"	Jikki	Acharya Aatreya	02:53
"Haayigaa Theeyagaa"	A. M. Rajah & Jikki	Acharya Aatreya	03:31
"Raaramma Raaramma"	Jikki	Acharya Aatreya	02:56
"Chikkave Chindana"	Pithapuram Nageswara Rao	Acharya Aatreya	02:42
"Vasantham Inthenaa"	Jikki	Acharya Aatreya	03:00
"Ninne Ninne Meghama"	P. Susheela & K. Jamuna Rani	Acharya Aatreya	03:06
"Kalyaname Cheli Vaibhogame"	A. P. Komala	Acharya Aatreya	03:54
"Hareram Hareram"		Acharya Aatreya	03:54

Tamil songs

The song "Nillu Nillu Megame" by P. Susheela, K. Jamuna Rani & Group did not take place in this film.

Song	Singers	Lyrics	Length
"Aasai Vachchen"	Seerkazhi Govindarajan & T. V. Rathnam	Udumalai Narayana Kavi	03:27
"Anbe Nee Ange"	A. M. Rajah & Jikki	A. Maruthakasi	02:29
"Idhuvo Namgathi"	Jikki	Udumalai Narayana Kavi	02:53
"Inbame Pongume"	A. M. Rajah & Jikki	A. Maruthakasi	03:31
"Kalyaanam Kalyaanam"	Jikki & Group	Udumalai Narayana Kavi	02:56
"Ennam Pole Pennum"	Seerkazhi Govindarajan	Udumalai Narayana Kavi	02:42
"Vasandha Kaalam"	Jikki	Udumalai Narayana Kavi	03:00
"Nillu Nillu Megame"	P. Susheela, K. Jamuna Rani & Group	A. Maruthakasi	03:06
"Kalyaname Selvi Kalyaname"	A. P. Komala & Group	A. Maruthakasi	03:54
"Raajaadhi Rajan Vandhen"	Kaka Radhakrishnan	Udumalai Narayana Kavi	02:05

== Release and reception ==
Bommai Kalyanam was released by Subbu & Co. Bommala Pelli fared slightly better than Bommai Kalyanam, which ran for 50 days in theatres. Bommai Kalyanam was panned by Kanthan of Kalki.
