= Kaviyoor Revamma =

Indian singer (1930–2007)

Background information
- Born: 14 April 1930; Kaviyoor, Thiruvalla
- Died: 13 May 2007 (aged 77)
- Occupation: Carnatic vocalist
- Spouse: P. Sreedharan

Kaviyoor C. K. Revamma (14 April 1930 – 13 May 2007) was a popular Carnatic vocalist. She started learning Carnatic music at the age of eight, and had her initiation into the career of a musician at Aruvipuram at the age of 16.

After securing first rank in her BA and MA (music) examinations, she received a PhD in music from the Kerala University, becoming the first person to earn a PhD in music there. Later, she lectured at the women's college in Thiruvananthapuram, where she became head of the Music department. Revamma also served as principal of Thrissur Government College and retired as deputy director of Collegiate Education.

Revamma sang in many films, including Jeevitha Nouka, Navalokam, Neelakuyil, Sasidharan, Ponkathir and Chechi. Her first film was Sasidharan. Revamma, P. Leela, and Jikky(Krishnaveni) were known as the singing trio of Malayalam films of yesteryears. Revamma provided playback singing for approximately 30 Malayalam films, including such musical hits as Jeevitha Nouka, Navalokam, Neelakuyil, Sasidharan, Ponkathir and Chechy. Her duet with A M Rajah mesmerised listeners with classic numbers like "Nee en chandrane," "njaan nin chandrika," and "Anputhan ponnambalthil" from the movie Avan Marannu. She also sang in several Tamil and Telugu films.

Notably, she sang several devotional hymns authored by Sree Narayana Guru.

Revamma later concentrated on teaching and research in music.

A holder of Ganabhushanam from the Thiruvananthapuram Music College, she also served as a member of the Board of Studies at Kerala, Calicut and Mahatma Gandhi universities. She taught at various colleges across the state. She conducted her postdoctoral studies in ethno-musicology at the University of California, Los Angeles (UCLA) on a Fulbright scholarship. Revamma also served as a visiting professor at various universities in the United States. She received the Kerala Sangeetha Nataka Akademi Award in 1975.
