= A. P. Komala =

Indian singer

- Born: 28 August 1934
- Died: 26 April 2024 (aged 89)
- Genre: Playback singing
- Occupation: Singer
- Instrument: Vocalist
- Years active: 1949–1973

Arkadu Parthasarathy Komala (28 August 1934 – 26 April 2024), commonly known as A. P. Komala, was an Indian playback singer. She sang songs in Tamil, Malayalam, Telugu and Kannada languages.

== Career life ==
She was a much sought after playback singer from the late 1940s till the mid-1960s in Tamil, Malayalam, Telugu and Kannada movies. She continued in Malayalam till the early 1970s, though she recorded very few songs in Tamil and Telugu during the 1960s.

== Carnatic singer ==
She was an 'A' grade Carnatic singer at All India Radio, Chennai.

=== Playback singers she sang with ===
Male singers

Sirkazhi Govindarajan, T. M. Soundararajan, A. M. Rajah, K. V. Mahadevan, T. A. Mothi, Ghantasala, Thiruchi Loganathan, C. S. Jayaraman, T. R. Mahalingam, K. R. Ramasamy, T. R. Ramachandran, J. P. Chandrababu, S. C. Krishnan, A. L. Raghavan, G. K. Venkatesh, P. B. Sreenivas, V. N. Sundaram, Mehboob, Kamukara Purushothaman, K. P. Udayabhanu, K. J. Yesudas, P. Jayachandran, Thankappan, M. Sathyam and Pithapuram Nageswara Rao.

Female singers

P. Leela, K. Jamuna Rani, M. L. Vasanthakumari, N. L. Ganasaraswathi, T. V. Rathnam, K. Rani, P. Bhanumathi, S. Varalakshmi, R. Balasaraswathi Devi, Jikki, P. Susheela, A. G. Rathnamala, S. Janaki, Santha P. Nair, P. Madhuri, K. V. Janaki, T. M. Sarojini, B. Vasantha, Renuka, P. A. Periyanayaki, Vaidehi, Sathyavathi, R. Maragadham and G. Ponnamma.

== Filmography ==
Year	Film	Language	Song	Music	Co-singers
1947	Thaai Nadu	Tamil	Engal Indhiya Bharathiye	R. Narayana Iyer	V. N. Sundaram
1949	Raksha Rekha	Telugu	Ravoyi Ravoyi Manoja	Ogirala Ramachandra Rao & H. R. Padmanabha Sastri	
1949	Raksha Rekha	Telugu	Bidiyama Manalo Priyathama	Ogirala Ramachandra Rao & H. R. Padmanabha Sastri	
1949	Raksha Rekha	Telugu	Neevuleni Jeevithame	Ogirala Ramachandra Rao & H. R. Padmanabha Sastri	
1949	Raksha Rekha	Telugu	Cheyi Cheyi Kalupukora	Ogirala Ramachandra Rao & H. R. Padmanabha Sastri	Kasturi Siva Rao
1949	Velaikaari	Tamil	Ulagam Palavidham	C. R. Subbaraman & S. M. Subbaiah Naidu	
1950	Manthiri Kumari	Tamil	Kannadichu Yaarai Neeyum	G. Ramanathan	
1950	Lakshmamma	Tamil		C. R. Subbaraman	
1950	Sri Lakshmamma Katha	Telugu	Thalaga Jalanu Ra	C. R. Subbaraman	
1950	Vijayakumari	Tamil	Anavathinale Azhivuthedathe	C. R. Subbaraman	
1950	Vijayakumari	Tamil	Laloo Laloo	C. R. Subbaraman	
1950	Vijayakumari	Tamil	Pandrimalai Panimamalai	C. R. Subbaraman	K. V. Janaki
1951	Kalavathi	Tamil	Neeyilladhu Yaar Enakor	M. S. Gnanamani	
1951	Kalavathi	Tamil	Ullasamaaga Vilaiyadalaame	M. S. Gnanamani	T. A. Jayalakshmi
1951	Kalavathi	Tamil	Vinodhame Sangeetham Pol	M. S. Gnanamani	G. Kasthoori & K. S. Lakshmi
1951	Kalavathi	Tamil	Vidhiyaal Vilaindha Thunbamo	M. S. Gnanamani	T. A. Jayalakshmi
1951	Kalavathi	Tamil	Saaradha Mamani Neeye Gathi	M. S. Gnanamani	T. A. Jayalakshmi
1951	Kalavathi	Tamil	Namaste Adhi Namaste	M. S. Gnanamani	K. S. Rajam, U. R. Chandra & K. S. Lakshmi
1951	Navvite Navaratnalu	Telugu			
1951	Niraparadhi	Tamil	Aasai Machan O Nesa Machan	Ghantasala	
1951	Pelli Kooturu	Telugu	1950 Ki 60 Ki Ento Tedaa	C. R. Subbaraman	M. L. Vasanthakumari
1952	Priyasakhi	Tamil	Pudhu Pudhu Malligai	Br Lakshmanan	T. A. Mothi
1952	Aathmasanthi	Malayalam	Maaruvathille Lokame	T. R. Pappa	
1952	Aathmasanthi	Malayalam	Marayukayaay	T. R. Pappa	
1952	Aathmasanthi	Malayalam	Varamaay Priyatharamaay	T. R. Pappa	
1952	Aathmasanthi	Malayalam	Madhuragaayaka	T. R. Pappa	
1952	Aathmasanthi	Malayalam	Pazhaaya Jeevithame	T. R. Pappa	
1952	Aathmasanthi	Malayalam	Madhumayamaay	T. R. Pappa	P. Leela & T. A. Mothi
1952	Aathmasanthi	Tamil	Valluvan Solle Vedhamaam	T. R. Pappa	
1952	Aathmasanthi	Tamil	Manamariyaa Kaadhale	T. R. Pappa	
1952	Aathmasanthi	Tamil	Jegame Inbha Mayame	T. R. Pappa	
1952	Aathmasanthi	Tamil	Manidha Vaazhvile, Mahimaiyaanadhe	T. R. Pappa	
1952	Aathmasanthi	Tamil	Veenaasai Yen Maname	T. R. Pappa	
1952	Aathmasanthi	Tamil	Vandirendum Odudhu Paar	T. R. Pappa	P. Leela & T. A. Mothi
1952	Alphonsa	Malayalam	Varumo Varumo	T. R. Pappa	T. A. Mothi
1952	Andhaman Kaidhi	Tamil	College Padippukku Goodbye Nam Kadhal Vaazhvukkini Welcome	G. Govindarajulu Naidu	T. V. Rathnam
1952	En Thangai	Tamil	Azhagaai Bommai Vaitthu	C. N. Pandurangan	
1952	En Thangai	Tamil	Annaiye Arul Thaaarum Mary Thaaye	C. N. Pandurangan	
1952	Kaadhal	Tamil	Anandame Aahaa Anandame	C. R. Subbaraman	
1952	Kumaari	Tamil	Aaye Aaye Jee Maaye	K. V. Mahadevan	
1952	Kumaari	Tamil	Cholla Cholla Ulley Vetkam	K. V. Mahadevan	
1952	Manavathi	Tamil	Gopaalaa Gunaseela	H. R. Padmanabha Sastry & B. Rajanikanta Rao	
1952	Moondru Pillaigal	Tamil	Antha Rama Sowndharyam	P. S. Anantharaman & M. D. Parthasarathy	M. L. Vasanthakumari
1952	Pelli Chesi Choodu	Telugu	Brahmayya O Brahmayya	Ghantasala	K. Rani & Udutha Sarojini
1952	Penn Manam	Tamil	Vetri Vetri Vetri	Kunnakudi Venkatarama Iyer	T. A. Mothi & Madhavapeddi Satyam
1952	Penn Manam	Tamil	Aram Seiya Virumbu	Kunnakudi Venkatarama Iyer	
1952	Prema	Telugu	Munthaperugoi Babu	C. R. Subbaraman	Kasturi Siva Rao
1952	Prema	Telugu	Mahilala Rajyam	C. R. Subbaraman	Kasturi Siva Rao & Ghantasala
1953	Anbu	Tamil	Vendhazhalaai Erikkum Venmadhiye	T. R. Pappa	N. L. Ganasaraswathi
1953	Azhagi	Tamil	Yereduthu Paarka Maatengire	P. R. Mani	K. R. Sellamuthu
1953	Azhagi	Tamil	Anjaadheenga Anjaadheenga	P. R. Mani	K. R. Sellamuthu
1953	Bratuku Teruvu	Tamil	Raadooyi Kanaraadooyi	Ghantasala	P. Leela
1953	Chandirani	Tamil	Maavinodha Maasiladha Madhana	Viswanathan–Ramamoorthy	
1953	Chandirani	Telugu	Eevoyyara Neevilasa Mogorada Raja	Viswanathan–Ramamoorthy	
1953	Jenova	Tamil	Aaanandham Aaanandham	T. A. Kalyanam, M. S. Gnanamani & M. S. Viswanathan	
1953	Madana Mohini	Tamil	Aanum Pennum Aasai Vechu Aattam Podum Kaadhale	K. V. Mahadevan	
1953	Madana Mohini	Tamil	Aadhi Mudhalaanava	K. V. Mahadevan	N. L. Ganasaraswathi
1953	Madana Mohini	Tamil	Pombalaithaan Endru Ennavendaam	K. V. Mahadevan	
1953	Mamiyar	Tamil	Leela Hallo, Leela Open	C. N. Pandurangan	P. A. Periyanayaki
1953	Marumagal	Tamil	Nattiya Nadakam Anukku Pennum	C. R. Subbaraman	P. A. Periyanayaki & A. G. Rathnamala
1953	Marumagal	Tamil	Rumani Mampazham Pole	C. R. Subbaraman	T. R. Ramachandran
1953	Marumagal	Tamil	Chinna Chinna Veedu Katti	C. R. Subbaraman	Jikki
1953	Marumagal	Tamil	Jal Jal Jal Kingkini Aada	C. R. Subbaraman	
1953	Paropakaram	Tamil	Vaazhve Sogamdhaanaa	Ghantasala	P. Leela, A. M. Rajah & Ghantasala
1953	Paropakaram	Tamil	Ezhaigalin Ulagame	Ghantasala	
1953	Pichi Pullayya	Telugu	Manasara Okasari Matadavoyi	T. V. Raju	
1953	Pichi Pullayya	Telugu	O Panthulu Garu Vinaremayya	T. V. Raju	Pithapuram Nageswara Rao
1953	Ponni	Tamil	Aaduvome Oonjal Aaduvome	S. M. Subbaiah Naidu	P. A. Periyanayaki, Radha Jayalakshmi & C. B. Radha
1953	Vanjam	Tamil	Varaporaar Idho Varaporaar	T. A. Kalyanam	
1953		Tamil	Kaathal Endraale	Naushad	K. V. Mahadevan
1954	Chandraharam	Telugu	Yevarivo Yechatanundivo	Ghantasala	Ghantasala
1954	Chandraharam	Tamil	Vaazhvile Kanavu Palikkumo	Ghantasala	Ghantasala
1954	En Magal	Tamil	Aadhavanai Polave Dhinamum	C. N. Pandurangan	A. M. Rajah
1954	Pudhu Yugam	Tamil	Jaadhiyile Naanga Thaazhndhavanga	G. Ramanathan	Jikki, A. G. Rathnamala & N. L. Ganasaraswathi
1954	Pudhu Yugam	Tamil	Kangal Rendum Pesudhe	G. Ramanathan	
1954	Ratha Kanneer	Tamil	Manidhar Vaazhvile Manam Adhu Pole	C. S. Jayaraman	
1954	Ratha Paasam	Tamil	Enge Selvayo	M. K. Athmanathan & A. V. Natarajan	A. M. Rajah
1954	Sorgavasal	Tamil	Naanae Indha Naattin	Viswanathan–Ramamoorthy	
1954	Sugam Enge	Tamil	Kannai Kavarum Azhagu Malai	Viswanathan–Ramamoorthy	K. R. Ramasamy
1954	Thookku Thookki	Tamil	Sundhari Soundhari Nirandhariye	G. Ramanathan	P. Leela & T. M. Soundararajan
1954	Thookku Thookki	Tamil	Kuranginirundhu Pirandhavan Manidhan	G. Ramanathan	P. Leela, T. M. Soundararajan & V. N. Sundaram
1954	Todu Dongalu	Telugu		T. V. Raju	
1954	Vaira Malai	Tamil	Nadana Kala Rani	Viswanathan–Ramamoorthy	P. Leela & G. K. Venkatesh
1954	Vilayattu Bommai	Tamil	Maliyeri Maavilakku Poduvaar	T. G. Lingappa	
1955	Doctor Savithri	Tamil	Nayagan Patchamadi Ennakadhu Aayiram Latchamadi	G. Ramanathan	P. A. Periyanayaki
1955	Ezhayin Aasthi	Tamil	Subha Mangalam Pongidum Naale	T. A. Kalyanam & G. Natarajan	
1955	Gomathiyin Kaadhalan	Tamil	Varavendam Endru Solladi	G. Ramanathan	
1955	Jayasimha	Telugu	Manasaina Cheli Pilupu Vinaravela	T. V. Raju	R. Balasaraswathi Devi
1955	Jayasimha	Telugu	Muripemumeera Meekorikateera Vaarampina Kanukale	T. V. Raju	
1955	Jayasimha	Telugu	Tandana Hoyi Tandana	T. V. Raju	Ghantasala
1955	Jayasimman	Tamil	Malarthara Innum Mogamo	T. V. Raju	R. Balasaraswathi Devi
1955	Jayasimman	Tamil	Mudhal Muttham Pole	T. V. Raju	
1955	Jayasimman	Tamil		T. V. Raju	Ghantasala
1955	Jaya Gopi	Tamil	Mana Magizhndhen	Viswanathan–Ramamoorthy	Jikki
1955	Kalvanin Kadhali	Tamil	Alli Malar Solai	G. Govindarajulu Naidu & Ghantasala	P. Bhanumathi & K. Rani
1955	Kalyanam Seydhukko	Tamil	Kodukkathaan Vendumammaa	Ramaneekaran	
1955	Kalyanam Seydhukko	Tamil	Raajaa En Aasai Machaan	Ramaneekaran	Sirkazhi Govindarajan
1955	Kaveri	Tamil	Ezhettu Naalaagathaan	G. Ramanathan & Viswanathan–Ramamoorthy	N. S. Krishnan, T. A. Mathuram, Jikki, A. G. Rathnamala & S. J. Kantha
1955	Menaka	Tamil	Aasai Kaaddi Yaengalaagumaa	T. G. Lingappa, C. N. Pandurangan and Vedha	Sirkazhi Govindarajan
1955	Mudhal Thethi	Tamil	Engum Inbame Pongum	T. G. Lingappa	K. Rani
1955	Mudhal Thethi	Tamil	Ellorum Kelunga Ullasa Payanam	T. G. Lingappa	
1955	Mullaivanam	Tamil	Kaayaa Pazhamaa Sollunga	K. V. Mahadevan	
1955	Mullaivanam	Tamil	Kuravan Kurathi	K. V. Mahadevan	G. Ponnamma
1955	Nalla Thangal	Tamil	Komala Sezhunthaamarai Ezhil Meviye	G. Ramanathan	P. Leela, T. V. Rathnam, A. G. Rathnamala & Udutha Sarojini
1955	Needhipathi	Tamil	Parakkudhu Paar Pori Parakkudhu Paar	Viswanathan–Ramamoorthy	K. R. Ramasamy
1955	Santhanam	Kannada		S. Dakshinamurthi	
1955	Santhanam	Tamil		S. Dakshinamurthi	
1955	Santhanam	Telugu		S. Dakshinamurthi	
1955	Vijaya Gauri	Telugu		G. Ramanathan & Viswanathan–Ramamoorthy	N. S. Krishnan, T. A. Mathuram, Jikki, A. G. Rathnamala & S. J. Kantha
1956	Amara Deepam	Tamil	Nadodi Kootam Nanga Jillelelo	G. Ramanathan & T. Chalapathi Rao	T. M. Soundararajan, Sirkazhi Govindarajan & T. V. Rathnam
1956	Amara Deepam	Tamil	Kottai Katti Kaavi Katti	G. Ramanathan & T. Chalapathi Rao	S. C. Krishnan
1956	Bala Sanyasamma Katha	Telugu	Adugo Adugo Arudemchenu Bramdavanna Mohanudu	S. Rajeswara Rao	Ghantasala & P. S. Vaideghi
1956	Bale Raman	Tamil	Kaanene Kaanene	T. A. Kalyanam	P. Leela
1956	Bhale Ramudu	Telugu	Endunnavo Madhavaa Nandakumaraa	S. Rajeswara Rao	Jikki
1956	Manthravadi	Malayalam	Chanchaadunni	Br Lakshmanan	
1956	Marumalarchi	Tamil	Manam Ariyaadha Peraanandham	Pendyala Nageswara Rao	Jikki
1956	Mathar Kula Manickam	Tamil	Naalum Nalla Naalu	S. Rajeswara Rao	Thiruchi Loganathan
1956	Moondru Pengal	Tamil	Paathokongo Nallaa Paathkongo	K. V. Mahadevan	T. V. Rathnam
1956	Moondru Pengal	Tamil	Inba Vaazhvin Anbu Geetham	K. V. Mahadevan	T. A. Mothi
1956	Naan Petra Selvam	Tamil	Madha Pidha Guru Dheivam	G. Ramanathan	
1956	Naan Petra Selvam	Tamil	Thirudadhe Poi Solladhe Pichchai Edukkadhe	G. Ramanathan	
1956	Ohileshwara	Kannada	Nee Emma Jeeva	G. K. Venkatesh	T. Satyavathi
1956	Ondre Kulam	Tamil	Jaathigal Illaiyadi Paappa	S. V. Venkatraman & M. Ranga Rao	
1956	Ondre Kulam	Tamil	Jaathi Irandoliya	S. V. Venkatraman & M. Ranga Rao	
1956	Penki Pellam	Telugu	Paduchdanam Railu Bandi	N. D. V. Prasada Rao	Udutha Sarojini
1956	Prema Pasam	Tamil		S. Rajeswara Rao	Jikki
1956	Sadhaaram	Tamil	Enggum Oli Veesudhe Ennai Thedi	G. Ramanathan	P. Bhanumathi & A. G. Rathnamala
1956	Sadhaaram	Tamil	Annaiye Kaaliyamma Eeswari	G. Ramanathan	T. M. Soundararajan, V. T. Rajagopalan & A. G. Rathnamala
1956	Tenali Ramakrishna	Telugu	Taruna Sashanka	Viswanathan–Ramamoorthy	Ghantasala
1956	Tenali Raman	Tamil	Chittu Pola Mullaimottu Pola	Viswanathan–Ramamoorthy	
1957	Alavudheenum Arputha Villakkum	Tamil	Indaikkiruppadhu	S. Rajeswara Rao & S. Hanumantha Rao	
1957	Allauddin Adhbhuta Deepam	Telugu	Yauvanam Okate	S. Rajeswara Rao & S. Hanumantha Rao	
1957	Bhaktha Markandeya	Tamil	Aaduvadhum Paaduvadhum	Viswanathan–Ramamoorthy	
1957	Chakravarthi Thirumagal	Tamil	Nalunggittu Paarpomadi	G. Ramanathan	S. Varalakshmi
1957	Deva Sundari	Malayalam	Sree Padmanaabha	T. R. Papa	
1957	Karpukkarasi	Tamil	Illadha Adhisayamam	G. Ramanathan	K. Jamuna Rani
1957	Karpukkarasi	Tamil	Ellai Meerudhe Manam Thulli Odudhe	G. Ramanathan	K. Jamuna Rani & A. G. Rathnamala
1957	Makkalai Petra Magarasi	Tamil	Seemaikku Poi Padichchavaru	K. V. Mahadevan	S. C. Krishnan
1957	Manaalane Mangaiyin Baakkiyam	Tamil	Pollaadha Maaranum Villendhum	P. Adinarayana Rao	
1957	Manaalane Mangaiyin Baakkiyam	Tamil	Utthana Thom Thom Thanaa	P. Adinarayana Rao	P. Leela
1957	Manamagan Thevai	Tamil	Pottane Oru Podudhaan	G. Ramanathan	K. Jamuna Rani & A. G. Rathnamala
1957	Panduranga Mahatyam	Telugu	Ekkadoyi Muddula Bava	T. V. Raju	Pithapuram Nageswara Rao
1957	Panduranga Mahatyam	Telugu	Akkadaunde Pandurangadu	T. V. Raju	Ghantasala
1957	Raja Rajan	Tamil	Idhayam Thannaiye Umadhu Idhayam Naadudhe	K. V. Mahadevan	Sirkazhi Govindarajan
1957	Raja Rajan	Tamil	Nilavodu Vaanmugil Vilaiyaadudhe	K. V. Mahadevan	Sirkazhi Govindarajan
1957	Rathnagiri Rahasya	Kannada	Yavvanave Ee Yavvanave	T. G. Lingappa	K. Rani
1957	Rathnagiri Rahasyam	Telugu	Yavvanave Ee Yavvanave	T. G. Lingappa	K. Rani
1957	Rathnagiri Rahasyam	Telugu	Naattu Raajaa Aiyyaa Ittu Raa	T. G. Lingappa	K. Rani
1957	Suvarna Sundari	Telugu	Tadheem Nanana Thom Tillaanaa	P. Adinarayana Rao	P. Leela
1957	Thangamalai Ragasiyam	Tamil	Yauvvaname Yauvvaname	T. G. Lingappa	K. Rani
1957	Thangamalai Ragasiyam	Tamil	Varavenum Varavenum	T. G. Lingappa	K. Rani & A. G. Rathnamala
1957	Vinayaka Chaviti	Telugu	Kaliki Ne Krishnudane Palkaveme Bhama Nato	Ghantasala	P. Susheela
1958	Annaiyin Aanai	Tamil	Kolladhe Idhu Pole	S. M. Subbaiah Naidu	C. S. Jayaraman
1958	Avan Amaran	Tamil	Kaalanaa Minjaadhaiyaa Kaalanaa Minjaadhaiyaa	T. M. Ibrahim	Sirkazhi Govindarajan
1958	Avan Amaran	Tamil	Dhaam Dhoom Thagatham	T. M. Ibrahim	A. M. Rajah
1958	Bhaktha Ravana	Tamil	Indha Udal Moondru Naal	R. Sudarsanam & R. Govardhanam	
1958	Bhookailas	Telugu	Ee Meenu Moodunaalla	R. Sudarsanam & R. Govardhanam	
1958	Bhookailasa	Kannada	Neevege Mooru Dina	R. Sudarsanam & R. Govardhanam	
1958	Bommai Kalyanam	Tamil	Kalyaname Selvi Kalyaname	K. V. Mahadevan	
1958	Engal Kudumbam Perisu	Tamil	Ellaarum Nammavare	T. G. Lingappa	
1958	Engal Kudumbam Perisu	Tamil	Somasekara Loga Paalane	T. G. Lingappa	T. G. Lingappa & K. Rani
1958	Engal Kudumbam Perisu	Tamil	Varugave Varugave Guru Sevaiye	T. G. Lingappa	
1958	Kaathavaraayan	Tamil	Vetrriye Arulamma	G. Ramanathan	K. Jamuna Rani, K. Rani & Sundaramma
1958	Kaathavaraayan	Tamil	Kanne En.... Amudha Ootrile	G. Ramanathan	Ghantasala
1958	Karthavarayuni Katha	Telugu	Poosey Malli Remma	G. Ramanathan & G. Aswathama	K. Jamuna Rani, K. Rani & Sundaramma
1958	Karthavarayuni Katha	Telugu	Kaluva Rekula	G. Ramanathan & G. Aswathama	Ghantasala, Pithapuram Nageswara Rao & P. Leela
1958	Kanniyin Sabatham	Tamil	Naadaalum Raaja Neeye	T. G. Lingappa	
1958	Kudumba Gouravam	Tamil	Verum Vesham	Viswanathan–Ramamoorthy	A. G. Rathnamala
1958	Kudumba Gouravam	Tamil	Kaatthirukkom	Viswanathan–Ramamoorthy	A. G. Rathnamala
1958	Kudumba Gouravam	Tamil	China Jappan Rangoon	Viswanathan–Ramamoorthy	A. G. Rathnamala
1958	Maalaiyitta Mangai	Tamil	Innaadum Immozhiyum	Viswanathan–Ramamoorthy	
1958	Maalaiyitta Mangai	Tamil	Naanandri Yaar Varuvaar	Viswanathan–Ramamoorthy	T. R. Mahalingam
1958	Maalaiyitta Mangai	Tamil	Ennaadu Vaazhgavena	Viswanathan–Ramamoorthy	Sirkazhi Govindarajan
1958	Mangalya Bhagyam	Tamil	Anusooya Kadhaakaalatchebam	G. Ramanathan	Sirkazhi Govindarajan, M. L. Vasanthakumari, K. Jamuna Rani & A. G. Rathnamala
1958	Mangalya Bhagyam	Tamil	Paadu Pattaale Machaan	G. Ramanathan	A. G. Rathnamala & K. Jamuna Rani
1958	Sampoorna Ramayanam	Tamil	Sree Ramachandiran Magudabishega Thirukkolam Kaanbathatkey	K. V. Mahadevan	Sirkazhi Govindarajan, S. C. Krishnan, A. G. Rathnamala, K. Rani, Udutha Sarojini & M. S. Padma
1958	Sampoorna Ramayanam	Tamil	Mannellaam Ponnaagum Raaman Varavaaley	K. V. Mahadevan	S. C. Krishnan, A. G. Rathnamala, K. Rani, Udutha Sarojini & M. S. Padma
1958	Sarangadhara	Tamil	Kannaal Nallaa Paaru	G. Ramanathan	P. Bhanumathi & K. Rani
1958	Sarangadhara	Tamil	Periya Idatthu Vishayam Ippadi Irukku	G. Ramanathan	S. C. Krishnan
1958	School Master	Kannada	Ellaru Nammavare	T. G. Lingappa	
1958	School Master	Kannada	Swami Devane Loka Paalane	T. G. Lingappa	T. G. Lingappa & K. Rani
1958	School Master	Kannada	Bannirai Bannirai	T. G. Lingappa	K. Rani
1958	Thedi Vandha Selvam	Tamil	Thangame Thangam Yaaru Andha Maapillai Singam	T. G. Lingappa	P. Susheela
1958	Thirumanam	Tamil	Thirumanam ... Naalum Paathaachu	S. M. Subbaiah Naidu & T. G. Lingappa	Jikki & P. Leela
1958	Uthama Puthiran	Tamil	Yaaradi Nee Mohini	G. Ramanathan	T. M. Soundararajan, K. Jamuna Rani & Jikki
1958	Uthama Puthiran	Tamil	Mutthe Pavazhame.... Aala Pirandha En Kanmaniye	G. Ramanathan	R. Balasaraswathi Devi
1959	Amudhavalli	Tamil	Jilu Jilukkum Pachai Malai.... Chittukkuruvi Iva	Viswanathan–Ramamoorthy	T. V. Rathnam
1959	Athisaya Penn	Tamil	Makara Veenai	S. M. Subbaiah Naidu	
1959	Azhagarmalai Kalvan	Tamil	Padhungi Ninnu Paayum Vengai	B. Gopalam	S. C. Krishnan
1959	Bala Nagamma	Telugu	Yentho Yentho Vinthale	T. V. Raju	
1959	Kalyanikku Kalyanam	Tamil	Varushattile Oru Naalu Deepavali	G. Ramanathan	P. Leela & T. M. Soundararajan
1959	Kalyanikku Kalyanam	Tamil	Nee Anji Nadungathaedoi	G. Ramanathan	A. G. Rathnamala
1959	Kalyanikku Kalyanam	Tamil	Thai Porandhaa Vazhi Porakkum	G. Ramanathan	T. M. Soundararajan, V. R. Rajagopalan, P. Leela, A. G. Rathnamala, K. Jamuna Rani & Kamala
1959	Krishna Leelalu	Telugu			
1959	Mamiyar Mechina Marumagal	Tamil	Maithunare Maithunare	R. Sudarsanam	M. L. Vasanthakumari
1959	Manaiviye Manithanin Manickam	Tamil	Anbu Mugam Kaattinaan	S. Hanumantha Rao	
1959	Manimekalai	Tamil	Varuga Varuga Sugumaaraa	G. Ramanathan	P. Leela & Radha Jayalakshmi
1959	Minnalppadayaali	Malayalam	Aaraaru Varum Amma Pole	P. S. Diwakar	
1959	Naadodikal	Malayalam	Kaarani Raavilen	V. Dakshinamoorthy	Punitha
1959	Naadodikal	Malayalam	Varoo Varoo Munnil	V. Dakshinamoorthy	
1959	Naan Sollum Ragasiyam	Tamil	Vilaiyadu Raja Vilaiyadu	G. Ramanathan	J. P. Chandrababu
1959	Nala Dhamayanthi	Tamil	Ilanthalir Neeraadum Then Suvai	B. Gopalam	
1959	Nala Dhamayanthi	Tamil	Singara Dhamayanthi Seemandham	B. Gopalam	
1959	Paththarai Maathu Thangam	Tamil	Sirithu Pesi Otrumaiyaai	G. Govindarajulu Naidu & Tiruvenkadu Selvarathinam	P. Leela
1959	President Panchatcharam	Tamil	Chinna Ponnu Sirikudhu	G. Ramanathan	A. G. Rathnamala
1959	Rechukka Pagatichukka	Telugu	Kuchchu Topi	T. V. Raju	Ghantasala
1959	Raja Malaiya Simman	Tamil	Kannale Kaanbadhum Poiye	Viswanathan–Ramamoorthy	
1959	Raja Sevai	Tamil	Konangi Kulla Pottu	T. V. Raju	A. L. Raghavan
1959	Sivagangai Seemai	Tamil	Sivagangai Cheemai Engal Sivagangai Cheemai	Viswanathan–Ramamoorthy	T. M. Soundararajan & Sirkazhi Govindarajan
1959	Thamarai Kulam	Tamil		H. R. Padmanabha Sastri & T. A. Mothi	
1959	Thanga Padhumai	Tamil	Vizhi Vel Veechchile	Viswanathan–Ramamoorthy	K. Jamuna Rani
1959	Thanga Padhumai	Tamil	Marundhu Vikkira Maapillaikku	Viswanathan–Ramamoorthy	K. Jamuna Rani
1959	Veerapandiya Kattabomman	Tamil	Takku Takku Ena Adikkadi Thudikkum	G. Ramanathan	S. Varalakshmi & P. Susheela
1960	Bhakta Raghunath	Telugu	Jaya Murali Lola	Ghantasala	
1960	Bhatti Vikramarka	Telugu	Manasaara Kelinchinara	Pendyala Nageswara Rao	P. Susheela
1960	Bhatti Vikramathithan	Tamil	Madhanaa En Premai	Pendyala Nageswara Rao	P. Susheela
1960	Deepavali	Telugu	Sarasijaakshi Nee	Ghantasala	Ghantasala & Madhavapeddi Satyam
1960	Deepavali	Telugu	Viraali Kaipalle Nu Ra	Ghantasala	Ghantasala & P. Leela
1960	Deepavali	Telugu	Yadhumauli Priyasathinene	Ghantasala	Ghantasala & P. Susheela
1960	Deepavali	Telugu	Sariyaa Maatho	Ghantasala	
1960	Deepavali	Telugu	Poonivoi Tata	Ghantasala	J. V. Raghavulu
1960	Dashavathara	Kannada	Mundhe Balliya Hoovu	G. K. Venkatesh	S. Janaki
1960	Kalathur Kannamma	Tamil	Unaikkandu Mayangaadha	R. Sudarsanam	S. C. Krishnan, T. M. Soundararajan & M. S. Rajeswari
1960	Mavoori Ammayi	Telugu	Ee Byooṭilo Nanu Minnche Mr̥gamundaa	R. Sudarsanam	Madhavapeddi Satyam, Ghantasala, K. Apparao & M. S. Rajeswari
1960	Kanaka Durga Pooja Mahima	Telugu	Vasanthude Ragaaye	Rajan–Nagendra	
1960	Kuravanji	Tamil	Vaanarangal Kani Koduthu	T. R. Pappa	A. G. Rathnamala, P. Leela & C. S. Jayaraman
1960	Kuravanji	Tamil	Sengkayal Vandu	T. R. Pappa	C. S. Jayaraman, P. Leela & Ramaiya
1960	Kuzhandhaigal Kanda Kudiyarasu	Tamil	Aasaiyil Oonjalil Aadiduvom	T. G. Lingappa	Jikki
1960	Kuzhandhaigal Kanda Kudiyarasu	Tamil	Azhagiya Thaamarai Kannaa	T. G. Lingappa	S. Janaki
1960	Makkala Rajya	Kannada	Aaduva Aaseya	T. G. Lingappa	Jikki
1960	Makkala Rajya	Kannada	Jaya Jaya Gokula Baala	T. G. Lingappa	S. Janaki
1960	Pillalu Techina Challani Rajyam	Tamil	Aashala Uyyala Oogema	T. G. Lingappa	Jikki
1960	Pillalu Techina Challani Rajyam	Tamil	Sundara Nanda Kishora	T. G. Lingappa	S. Janaki
1960	Mangaikku Mangalyame Pradhanam	Tamil	Idhaya Dheviye Kanne	Jeevan	P. B. Sreenivas
1960	Neeli Saali	Malayalam	Otthakannittu Nokkum	K. Raghavan	Mehboob
1960	Neeli Saali	Malayalam	Neeyalla Tharundennude	K. Raghavan	Mehboob
1960	Neeli Saali	Malayalam	Maanathe Kunnin Charuvil	K. Raghavan	Mehboob
1960	Neeli Saali	Malayalam	Manushyante Nenjil	K. Raghavan	Mehboob
1960	Petra Manam	Tamil	Kanne Nee Sendru Vaadaa	S. Rajeswara Rao	
1960	Shanthi Nivasam	Telugu	Selayeti Galilona	Ghantasala	P. Leela
1960	Raja Bakthi	Tamil	Vellaik Kudhiraiyile	G. Govindarajulu Naidu	Jikki
1960	Ranadheera Kanteerava	Kannada	Radha Madhava	G. K. Venkatesh	P. B. Sreenivas
1960	Rani Honnamma	Kannada	Jeevana Hoovina Haasige	Vijaya Bhaskar	P. B. Sreenivas
1960	Rathinapuri Ilavarasi	Tamil	Magudam Kaakka Vandha	Viswanathan–Ramamoorthy	Thiruchi Loganathan
1960	Vijayapuri Veeran	Tamil	Inbam Konjum Vennila Vandhu Vambu Pannudhe	T. R. Papa	
1960	Vimala	Telugu	Yerra Yeeradana	S. M. Subbaiah Naidu	Madhavapeddi Satyam
1960	Vimala	Telugu	Chinni Nathavole	S. M. Subbaiah Naidu	K. Jamuna Rani
1961	Ara Pavan	Malayalam	Chekkanum Vanne	G. K. Venkatesh	
1961	Bhakta Kuchela	Malayalam	Kanna Thaamarakanna	Br Lakshmanan	
1961	Bhakta Kuchela	Malayalam	Kannil Urakkam Kuranju....Karunayaarnna	Br Lakshmanan	
1961	Bhakta Kuchela	Malayalam	Kazhiyuvaan....Jeevannu Nilayundo	Br Lakshmanan	
1961	Bhakta Kuchela	Malayalam	Kanivu Nirayum	Br Lakshmanan	P. Leela
1961	Bhakta Kuchela	Malayalam	Kanivu Nirayum	Br Lakshmanan	
1961	Christmas Rathri	Malayalam	Lelam Kale	Br Lakshmanan	
1961	Christmas Rathri	Malayalam	Kinaavinte	Br Lakshmanan	
1961	Christmas Rathri	Malayalam	1Appozhe Njan	Br Lakshmanan	Kamukara Purushothaman
1961	Christmas Rathri	Malayalam	Aattummanammele....Unniyarcha Naadakam	Br Lakshmanan	Kamukara Purushothaman & P. Leela
1961	Kittur Chennamma	Kannada	Aalakke Hoovilla	T. G. Lingappa	S. Janaki
1961	Malliyam Mangalam	Tamil	Alli Vizhi Asaiya.... Oviyam Sirikkudhu	T. A. Kalyanam	A. L. Raghavan
1961	Sati Sulochana	Telugu	Prabhu Yeela Ee Parishodhana	T. V. Raju	
1961	Sabarimala Ayyappan	Malayalam	Puthan Malar	S. M. Subbaiah Naidu	Thankappan
1961	Sri Valli	Tamil	Nittham Iranggi Varuvaai	G. Ramanathan	A. G. Rathnamala
1961	Yar Manamagan?	Tamil	Nilavil Malarum Kumudam	Br Lakshmanan	
1962	Dakshayagnam	Telugu		S. Hanumantha Rao	
1962	Laila Majnu	Malayalam	Kandaal Nalloru	M. S. Baburaj	Santha P. Nair
1962	Laila Majnu	Malayalam	Koottililam Kili	M. S. Baburaj	P. Leela
1962	Padandi Munduku	Telugu	Padandi Munduku Padandi Tosuku	S. P. Kodandapani	Ghantasala & Madhavapeddi Satyam
1962	Padandi Munduku	Telugu	Meluko Saagipo Bandhanalu Tenchuko	S. P. Kodandapani	Ghantasala & Madhavapeddi Satyam
1962	Raani Samyuktha	Tamil	Mullaimalar Kaadu Engal Mannavan Thennadu	K. V. Mahadevan	
1962	Santhi Nivas	Malayalam	Aanandakkaattilaadi	Ghantasala	P. Leela
1962	Shree Rama Pattabhishekam	Malayalam	Raajaadhi Raaja	Br Lakshmanan	Jikki & P. S. Vaideghi
1962	Shree Rama Pattabhishekam	Malayalam	Naaduvaazhuvaan	Br Lakshmanan	K. J. Yesudas, P. Susheela & Kamukara Purushothaman
1962	Velu Thampi Dalava	Malayalam	Viralonnillenkilum Veeranallenkilum	V. Dakshinamoorthy	K. P. Udhayabhanu
1962	Vidhi Thanna Vilakku	Malayalam	Kaarunya Saagarane....Guruvayupuresa	V. Dakshinamoorthy	P. Leela
1963	Aapta Mitrulu	Telugu	Rathi Manmadha	Ghantasala	P. Leela
1963	Ammaye Kaanaan	Malayalam	Dhaivame	K. Raghavan	
1963	Lava Kusa	Kannada	Edhakku Ee Paariyaa Kopam	Ghantasala	Pithapuram Nageswara Rao
1963	Lava Kusa	Telugu	Enduke Naa Meeda Kopam	Ghantasala	Pithapuram Nageswara Rao
1963	Punithavathi	Tamil	Gundu Malli Valarndhirukku	Hussein Reddy	Sirkazhi Govindarajan
1963	Sathi Shakthi	Kannada	Maathege Migilaada	T. G. Lingappa	Kamala
1963	Snapaka Yohannan	Malayalam	Osaana Osaana Daaveedin Suthane	Br Lakshmanan	Kamukara Purushothaman
1963	Snapaka Yohannan	Malayalam	Galeeliya Kadalile Meen Pidikkum	Br Lakshmanan	K. J. Yesudas
1963	Valmiki	Telugu	Pothanantade	Ghantasala	Madhavapeddi Satyam & J. V. Raghavulu
1963	Valmiki	Telugu	Tallalene Tallalene	Ghantasala	J. V. Raghavulu
1964	Aadya Kiranangal	Malayalam	Kizhakku Dikkile Chenthengil	K. Raghavan	
1964	Atom Bomb	Malayalam	Naanikkunnille	Br Lakshmanan	P. Leela
1964	Bharthavu	Malayalam	Swargathil Pokumbol	M. S. Baburaj	Uthaman
1964	Kuttikkuppayam	Malayalam	Velukkumbo Kulikkuvan	M. S. Baburaj	
1964	Marmayogi	Telugu	Madhuvu Manakela	Ghantasala	Ghantasala & K. Jamuna Rani
1964	Omanakuttan	Malayalam	Kuppivala Kaikalil	G. Devarajan	
1964	Ramadasu	Telugu	Adigo Bhadradri	G. Ashwathama & V. Nagayya	Ghantasala & P. B. Sreenivas
1964	Rishyasringar	Tamil	Vasandhamum Thendralum Vaazhndhidave	T. V. Raju	S. C. Krishnan
1964	Rishyasringar	Tamil	Unai Kandileyn	T. V. Raju	Ghantasala
1964	Rishyasringar	Tamil	Kalai Devane, Kalai Jeevane	T. V. Raju	M. S. Padma
1964	School Master	Malayalam	Jaya Jaya Jaya Janmabhoomi	T. G. Lingappa	K. J. Yesudas & P. Leela
1964	Sri Satyanarayana Mahathyam	Telugu	Siva Kesavaswamy (Padyam)	Ghantasala	P. Leela
1964	Sri Satyanarayana Mahathyam	Telugu	Sathya Devuni Sundara Roopamu	Ghantasala	Ghantasala
1964	Sri Satyanarayana Mahathyam	Telugu	Om Namo Narayana	Ghantasala	
1964	Sri Satyanarayana Mahathyam	Telugu	Naadha Jagannaadha	Ghantasala	Ghantasala & B. Vasantha
1965	Bangaru Panjaram	Telugu	Ne Padamule Chalu Rama	S. Rajeswara Rao	
1965	Kuppivala	Malayalam	Kurunthottikkaaya	M. S. Baburaj	
1965	Porter Kunjali	Malayalam	Katturumbinte Kaathu Kuthana	M. S. Baburaj	
1965	Sarppakavu	Malayalam	Malamakal Thane Manaalanimbamai	M. S. Baburaj	P. Leela
1965	Sarppakavu	Malayalam	Nanma Cheyyenam Njangalkkennum	M. S. Baburaj	P. Leela & Kamukara Purushothaman
1965	Satya Harishchandra	Telugu		Pendyala Nageshwara Rao	
1965	Shyamala Chechi	Malayalam	Kannupotthikkali	K. Raghavan	
1965	Shyamala Chechi	Malayalam	Kaithozhaam Kanna	K. Raghavan	P. Leela
1965	Thayin Karunai	Tamil	Chiina Chinna Kovil	G. K. Venkatesh	S. Janaki
1965	Thayin Karunai	Tamil	Singaaram Edherkendru Sollavaa	G. K. Venkatesh	S. Janaki
1966	Kanne Manasulu	Telugu			
1966	Paramanandayya Sishyula Katha	Telugu	Vanita Tanantata Tane Valachina Inta Niraadharana	Ghantasala	P. Leela
1966	Pinchuhridhayam	Malayalam	Mallaakshee Mani Moule	V. Dakshinamoorthy	P. Leela
1966	Rangula Ratnam	Telugu	Chepa Rupamuna Kurma Rupuvai Pannaga Sayana	S. Rajeswara Rao & B. Gopalam	M. L. Vasanthakumari
1966	Thayin Mel Aanai	Tamil	Jivvunu Sevattha Machan	T. G. Lingappa	P. Leela
1967	Balyakalasakhi	Malayalam	Ummini Ummini Uyarathu	M. S. Baburaj	Saraswathi
1967	Kunjali Maraikkar	Malayalam	Aattinakkare	B. A. Chidambaranath	P. Jayachandran, A. K. Sukumaran, B. Vasantha & K. P. Chandramohan
1967	Lady Doctor	Malayalam	Avideyumilla Visesham	V. Dakshinamoorthy	
1967	Ollathumathi	Malayalam	Ee Valliyil Ninnu Chemme	L.P.R. Varma	Renuka
1967	Ollathumathi	Malayalam	Njanoru Kashmeeri Sundari	L.P.R. Varma	Renuka & B. Vasantha
1967	Rahasyam	Telugu	Girija Kalyanam	Ghantasala	
1967	Rahasyam	Telugu	Srilalitha Shivajyothi Sarvakaamadaa	Ghantasala	Ghantasala, P. Leela, P. S. Vaideghi, Udutha Sarojini & M. S. Padma
1968	Dial 2244	Malayalam	Jeevitha Kshethrathin	G. K. Venkatesh	
1968	Padunna Puzha	Malayalam	Sindhubhairavi Raagarasam	V. Dakshinamoorthy	P. Leela
1968	Padunna Puzha	Malayalam	Padunna Puzha	V. Dakshinamoorthy	P. Leela
1968	Viruthan Shanku	Malayalam	Jananiyum Janakanum	B. A. Chidambaranath	P. Leela
1969	Magizhampoo	Tamil	Aaalolam Aalolam Ooran Thottatthu	D. B. Ramachandra	L. R. Eswari
1969	Mannippu	Tamil	Kuyilosaiyai Vellum	S. M. Subbaiah Naidu	P. Susheela
1969	Mannippu	Tamil	Nee Engey (pathos)	S. M. Subbaiah Naidu	
1973	Thaniniram	Malayalam	Ivan Whiskey	G. Devarajan	P. Madhuri
1975	Daari Tappida Maga	Kannada	Kaapadu Sri Satyanarayana	G. K. Venkatesh	P. B. Sreenivas & S. Janaki

== Hit songs ==
- Velukkumbo kulikkuvan Kuttikkuppayam
- Sarkkara Panthalil Thenmazha Choriyum (Recorded by Komala, but KPAC Sulochana sang it in theatres)
