= T. V. Rathnam =

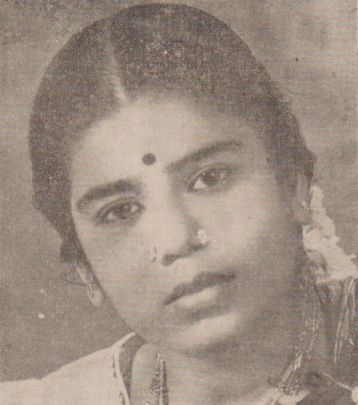
- T. V. Rathnam in late 1940s

Background information
- Born: Tenkasi Vallinayagam Rathnam; 1930; Tenkasi, Madras Presidency, British India (now Tamil Nadu, India)
- Died: 17 October 1984 (aged 53–54) Madras (now Chennai), Tamil Nadu, India
- Genres: Film music (playback singing), Indian classical music
- Occupation: Singer
- Instrument: Vocalist

Tenkasi Vallinayagam Rathnam (Tamil: தென்காசி வள்ளிநாயகம் (டி.வி.) ரத்தினம்) (1930 - 17 October 1984) hailed from Tenkasi, Madras Presidency, British India. She was a playback singer for Tamil films.

== Early life ==
She was Born in Tenkasi to Vallinayagam Pillai and Aavudai Ammal in 1929. Rathnam had learned music from the age of seven under a guru called Ramalinga Aachari, and gave her first full-fledged concert in Sri Lanka. She became a drama artiste and film artist as a child. Pursued her tutelage under Vidhwan Ramnad Krishnan at the age at 12 which paved way for playback singing later.

Married to Visvanathan Pillai in 1947.

Then she moved on to playback singing in the Tamil film industry.

== Career life ==
She was 10 years old when she acted in Bhaktha Chetha in 1940 for the Madras United Artitstes. She then acted as the child Kannagi in Kannagi in 1942 for the Jupiter Pictures and also sang her own song. In the meantime, she had continued her training under Ramnad Krishnan, and later trained under Chembai Vaidyanatha Bhagavatar.

Rathnam was a much sought after singer in the late 1940s and 1950s. She became popular with the film music directors of that era who had worked with her repeatedly.

Rathnam became famous by her songs in Miss Malini (1947) by the Gemini Studios. She also had a rare chance in Ponmudi (1950) by Modern Theatres when the music director the great G. Ramanathan had sung the songs by his composition, himself. He had chosen TVR to pair him as the female singer for him.

=== Music composers she sang for ===
- V. S. Parthasarathy Iyengar
- S. V. Venkatraman
- M. D. Parthasarathy
- S. Rajeswara Rao
- Parur S. Anantharaman
- S. M. Subbaiah Naidu
- C. R. Subburaman
- R. Sudarsanam
- G. Ramanathan
- G. Govindarajulu Naidu
- Viswanathan–Ramamoorthy
- Robin Chatterjee
- T. G. Lingappa
- K. V. Mahadevan
- C. S. Jayaraman
- K. N. Dandayudhapani Pillai
- S. Dakshinamurthi
- T. R. Pappa
- T. Chalapathi Rao
- V. Dakshinamoorthy
- T. R. Ramanathan
- Krishnamurthi & Nagaraja Iyer
- S. Hanumantha Rao
- Master Venu
- T. M. Ibrahim
- M. S. Gnanamani
- Pendyala Nageswara Rao
- N. S. Balakrishnan
- O. P. Nayyar
- C. Ramchandra
- Vedha
- C. N. Pandurangan
- Meenakshi Subramanyam
- Tiruvenkadu Selvarathinam
- M. Ranga Rao
- Ghantasala
- P. Adinarayana Rao
- Hussein Reddy
- G. K. Venkatesh
- M. S. Viswanathan
- V. Kumar

=== Playback singers she sang with ===
She had many solo songs but also sang with other singers. Many of her duets are with S. C. Krishnan, T. M. Soundararajan and Seerkazhi Govindarajan. Others are G. Ramanathan, A. M. Rajah, M. M. Mariappa, T. A. Mothi, Thiruchi Loganathan, C. R. Subburaman, P. B. Sreenivas, S. V. Ramanan, V. J. Varma, V. T. Rajagopalan and S. V. Ponnusamy.

She also sang duets with female singers with most notably with P. Leela and A. P. Komala. Others include P. Susheela, N. L. Ganasaraswathi, K. V. Janaki, T. R. Bhagirathi, Jikki, K. Jamuna Rani, Radha Jayalakshmi, A. G. Rathnamala, M. L. Vasanthakumari, L. R. Eswari, Soolamangalam Rajalakshmi, Swarnalatha and G. Kasthoori.

The singing actors she sang with were T. R. Mahalingam, K. R. Ramasamy and K. S. Angamuthu.

== Filmography ==
=== Playback singer ===
Year	Film	Language	Song	Music	Co-singer
1940	Bhaktha Chetha	Tamil	Mohana Muralidharaa	V. S. Parthasarathy Iyengar	
1942	Kannagi	Tamil	Maalaakinen Swaami	S. V. Venkatraman	
1944	Dasi Aparanji	Tamil	Kaanavendum Kayilaiyai	M. D. Parthasarathy & S. Rajeswara Rao	
1947	Miss Malini	Tamil	Jegame Oru Chiththira Salai	S. Rajeswara Rao & Parur S. Anantharaman	
1947	Miss Malini	Tamil	Sri Saraswathi Namosthuthe	S. Rajeswara Rao & Parur S. Anantharaman	
1947	Miss Malini	Tamil	Paadum Radio Buttonai Thiruppi Vittaa	S. Rajeswara Rao & Parur S. Anantharaman	
1947	Miss Malini	Tamil	Senthamizh Naadu Sezhithidave	S. Rajeswara Rao & Parur S. Anantharaman	
1947	Miss Malini	Tamil	Mylapore Vakkeelathu	S. Rajeswara Rao & Parur S. Anantharaman	
1947	Rajakumari	Tamil	Paattil Enna Solven Paangi	S. M. Subbaiah Naidu	K. V. Janaki
1948	Chakradhari	Tamil	Thaalo Thaalo.... Kanne Thaalelo	M. D. Parthasarathy	
1948	Chakradhari	Tamil	Vaa Vaa Ambuliye	M. D. Parthasarathy	
1948	Mohini	Tamil	Vasandha Maalai Neram	S. M. Subbaiah Naidu & C. R. Subburaman	M. M. Mariyappa
1948	Vedhala Ulagam	Tamil	Velaar Vizhi Maadhai Manam Seiya	R. Sudarsanam	
1948	Vedhala Ulagam	Tamil	Gopiyar Konjum Ramana	R. Sudarsanam	
1949	Inbavalli	Tamil	Naadhaa En Aasai Neere	G. Ramanathan	T. R. Mahalingam
1949	Navajeevanam	Tamil	Aasai Anugraha Maaraa	S. V. Venkataraman	
1949	Velaikaari	Tamil	Ada Varuvaayaa Kannaa	C. R. Subburaman	
1949	Velaikaari	Tamil	Laali Laali suba Laali Laali	C. R. Subburaman	P. Leela
1949	Velaikaari	Tamil	Vaazhiya Needoozhi Paguttharivaalar	C. R. Subburaman	K. V. Janaki
1949	Velaikaari	Tamil	Ulagatthile Unnadhamaai Uyarndha	C. R. Subburaman	
1950	Krishna Vijayam	Tamil	Bageeradhi Ennadi Aniyaayam Idhu	S. M. Subbaiah Naidu	P. Leela, K. V. Janaki, T. R. Bhagirathi & K. S. Angamuthu
1950	Krishna Vijayam	Tamil	Vaasuki Paambu Thaampaki	S. M. Subbaiah Naidu	T. M. Soundararajan
1950	Parijatham	Tamil	Vaan Nilavae Mana Mohana	S. V. Venkatraman & C. R. Subburaman	T. R. Mahalingam
1950	Parijatham	Tamil	Maaya Chirrippile	S. V. Venkatraman & C. R. Subburaman	
1950	Parijatham	Tamil	Madhiyaa Vidhiyaa	S. V. Venkatraman & C. R. Subburaman	C. R. Subburaman
1950	Parijatham	Tamil	Thane Varuvaaradi	S. V. Venkatraman & C. R. Subburaman	
1950	Parijatham	Tamil	Enadhannai Unnai Peidhe	S. V. Venkatraman & C. R. Subburaman	
1950	Ponmudi	Tamil	Neela Vanum Nilavum Pol	G. Ramanathan	G. Ramanathan
1950	Ponmudi	Tamil	Van Mazhaiyindri Vadidum Payir Pola	G. Ramanathan	G. Ramanathan
1950	Ponmudi	Tamil	Aruyire Premai Amudha Variyil	G. Ramanathan	G. Ramanathan
1950	Ponmudi	Tamil	Meikadhal Arumbu Vazhvinile Poothathe Indre	G. Ramanathan	G. Ramanathan
1950	Ponmudi	Tamil	En Prema Rooba... Inbathin Ellai Idhuthana	G. Ramanathan	
1950	Vijayakumari	Tamil	Kondaadum Suba	C. R. Subburaman	P. Leela
1951	Marmayogi	Tamil	Manathukisaindha Raajaa	S. M. Subbaiah Naidu	
1951	Marmayogi	Tamil	Ah... Inbam Iravil Amaidhiyile	S. M. Subbaiah Naidu	
1952	Andhaman Kaidhi	Tamil	Anju Rooba Nottai Konjam MinnE Maatthi	G. Govindarajulu Naidu	
1952	Andhaman Kaidhi	Tamil	Mayangaadhe Madhi Mayangaadhe	G. Govindarajulu Naidu	
1952	Andhaman Kaidhi	Tamil	Inbam Neruma En Vaazhvil Inbam Neruma	G. Govindarajulu Naidu	
1952	Andhaman Kaidhi	Tamil	College Padippukku Goodbye	G. Govindarajulu Naidu	A. P. Komala
1952	Andhaman Kaidhi	Tamil	Padipodu Nalla Panbumirundhal	G. Govindarajulu Naidu	
1952	Andhaman Kaidhi	Tamil	Ennaasai Kannaatti Unnai	G. Govindarajulu Naidu	
1952	Andhaman Kaidhi	Tamil	Aasai Kili Pol Pesum	G. Govindarajulu Naidu	A. P. Komala
1952	Andhaman Kaidhi	Tamil	Aiyaamaare Unga Kaiyaale	G. Govindarajulu Naidu	A. P. Komala
1952	Panam	Tamil	Idhayathai Irumbaakki ....Manamudaiyorai Manidhargal	Viswanathan–Ramamoorthy	
1952	Jameenthar	Tamil	Enakkum Unakkum Isaintha	G. Ramanathan	
1953	Manithan	Tamil	Meesai Naraichavan Pendaatti	S. V. Venkatraman	
1953	Ratna Deepam	Tamil	Kandadhu Mudhal Aasai Konden	Robin Chatterjee	
1953	Ratna Deepam	Tamil	Yaaro Idhai Sitrinbam Enbaar	Robin Chatterjee	
1953	Ratna Deepam	Tamil	Pagaivanukarulvaai	Robin Chatterjee	
1954	Kalyanam Panniyum Brammachari	Tamil	Naagareegama Idhu Naagareegama	T. G. Lingappa	
1954	Koondukkili	Tamil	Solla Vallaayo Kiliye	K. V. Mahadevan	
1954	Koondukkili	Tamil	Aanandhamaai Vaazha Vendume	K. V. Mahadevan	
1954	Manohara	Tamil	Nilaavile Ullaasamaaga Paadalaam	S. V. Venkatraman	T. A. Mothi
1954	Manohara	Tamil	Ennai Paar Ennazhagai Paaru	S. V. Venkatraman	
1954	Ratha Kanneer	Tamil	Aalai Aaaai Paarkkiraar	C. S. Jayaraman	
1954	Ratha Kanneer	Tamil	Maalai Itta Mannan Yaaro	C. S. Jayaraman	
1954	Sorgavasal	Tamil	Raajaathi Raajan Namma Raaja	Viswanathan–Ramamoorthy	
1954	Sorgavasal	Tamil	Sandhosham Theda Vendum Vaazhvile	Viswanathan–Ramamoorthy	Thiruchi Loganathan
1954	Sorgavasal	Tamil	Veeram Serindha Mugam	Viswanathan–Ramamoorthy	K. R. Ramasamy
1954	Thuli Visham	Tamil	Ennai Ariyaamal Perugudhu Inbamthaan	K. N. Dandayudhapani Pillai	V. J. Varma
1954	Thuli Visham	Tamil	Neengal Varavendum Dhuraiye	K. N. Dandayudhapani Pillai	
1954	Viduthalai	Tamil	Boologame Pugazhum	Lakshman Raghunath	
1954	Vipra Narayana	Telugu	Thom Thathaara Thaane Thathiranaa	S. Rajeswara Rao	
1955	Asai Anna Arumai Thambi	Tamil	Irandha Kaala Vaazhvai Enni	K. V. Mahadevan	
1955	Gomathiyin Kaadhalan	Tamil	Sirpa Kalai Vizhaavin Arpudhangalukkellaam	G. Ramanathan	P. Leela & Radha Jayalakshmi
1955	Maaman Magal	Tamil	Dhevi Neeye Thunai	S. V. Venkatraman	
1955	Maheswari	Tamil	Alli Veesunga Panatthai Alli Veesunga	G. Ramanathan	
1955	Maheswari	Tamil	Aagaaya Veedhiyile.... Paarum Thannaale	G. Ramanathan	
1955	Mangaiyar Thilakam	Tamil	Ketta Penmani	S. Dakshinamurthi	
1955	Mangaiyar Thilakam	Tamil	Adhiga Pechuk Kaari	S. Dakshinamurthi	
1955	Mudhal Thethi	Tamil	Aham Kulira.... Mudhal Thethi Indru	T. G. Lingappa	
1955	Mudhal Thethi	Tamil	Chinna Chinna Bommai Venum	T. G. Lingappa	K. Rani
1955	Modala Thedi	Kannada	Modal Thedi Indu	T. G. Lingappa	
1955	Nalla Thangai	Tamil	O! Seemaane Thirumbi Paarkkum	G. Ramanathan	
1955	Needhipathi	Tamil	Anbe Nam Dheivam	Viswanathan–Ramamoorthy	
1955	Needhipathi	Tamil	Aanandhame Aanandham	Viswanathan–Ramamoorthy	N. L. Ganasaraswathi
1955	Valliyin Selvan	Tamil	Ayiram Kaalatthu	Parur S. Anantharaman	
1955	Valliyin Selvan	Tamil	Vilaiyaadum Dheivamadi	Parur S. Anantharaman	M. L. Vasanthakumari
1955	Valliyin Selvan	Tamil	Panjaayaththukku Vaa Pulle	Parur S. Anantharaman	T. M. Soundararajan
1955	Vipra Narayana	Tamil	Thom Thathaara Thaane Thathiranaa	S. Rajeswara Rao	
1956	Aasai	Tamil	Kanni Thamizh.... Oviyanin Ullamthanai	T. R. Pappa	A. M. Rajah
1956	Aasai	Tamil	Adi Paadi Odi Aadum Azhagai Paarungga	T. R. Pappa	P. Leela
1956	Aasai	Tamil	Kanninaar Nalladhaiyaa	T. R. Pappa	
1956	Amara Deepam	Tamil	Naadodi Koottam Naanga	T. Chalapathi Rao & G. Ramanathan	T. M. Soundararajan, Seerkazhi Govindarajan & A. P. Komala
1956	Avar Unarunnu	Malayalam	Oru Mullappanthalil	V. Dakshinamoorthy	
1956	Kula Dheivam	Tamil	Aanum Pennum	R. Sudarsanam	
1956	Kula Dheivam	Tamil	Vaarayo Ennai Paaraayo	R. Sudarsanam	
1956	Mathar Kula Manickam	Tamil	Denjaru Aiyaa Denjaru	S. Rajeswara Rao	G. Kasthoori
1956	Moondru Pengal	Tamil	Vaanmugil Kanda Vanna Thogai Mayil Pole	K. V. Mahadevan	T. A. Mothi
1956	Moondru Pengal	Tamil	Paathokongo Nallaa Paathkongo	K. V. Mahadevan	A. P. Komala
1956	Moondru Pengal	Tamil	Arul Puriginraal Annai	K. V. Mahadevan	
1956	Naane Raja	Tamil	Aanum Pennum Vaazhvinil Inbam	T. R. Ramanathan	
1956	Naane Raja	Tamil	Pesuvadhaal Inbam Peruaar Undo	T. R. Ramanathan	
1956	Nalla Veedu	Tamil	Govindhan Kuzhalosai Keleer	Krishnamurthi; Nagaraja Iyer	
1956	Nannambikkai	Tamil	Kalyaana Velai Vandhu Kaathirukkudhu	S. V. Venkatraman	
1956	Nannambikkai	Tamil	Anbe Aadhiye	S. V. Venkatraman	
1956	Nannambikkai	Tamil	Kaar Mugilin Maeni	S. V. Venkatraman	
1956	Raja Rani	Tamil	Thirumana Maagaadha Penne	T. R. Pappa	
1956	Raja Rani	Tamil	Kaanadha Inbamellaam Kandidalaam	T. R. Pappa	Seerkazhi Govindarajan
1956	Raja Rani	Tamil	Aanandha Nilai Peruvom	T. R. Pappa	N. L. Ganasaraswathi
1956	Rangoon Radha	Tamil	Ayarpaadi Kannaa Nee	T. R. Pappa	
1957	Aaravalli	Tamil	Inge Meesaiyulla	G. Ramanathan	K. Jamuna Rani
1957	Aaravalli	Tamil	Kummaalam Pottathellaam	G. Ramanathan	A. G. Rathnamala
1957	Baagyavathi	Tamil	Kannaale Vettaadhe	S. Dakshinamurthi	S. C. Krishnan
1957	Baagyavathi	Tamil	Vennilavin Oli Thanile	S. Dakshinamurthi	A. M. Rajah & S. C. Krishnan
1957	Bhale Ammayilu	Telugu	Theem Thaam Thirana (Thillana)	S. Rajeswara Rao & S. Hanumantha Rao	M. L. Vasanthakumari
1957	Chakravarthi Thirumagal	Tamil	Athaanum Naanthaane	G. Ramanathan	S. C. Krishnan
1957	Engal Veettu Mahalakshmi	Tamil	Sendhiru Maadhum Kalai Maadhum	Master Venu	P. Susheela
1957	Iru Sagodharigal	Tamil	Theem Thaam Thirana (Thillana)	S. Rajeswara Rao	M. L. Vasanthakumari
1957	Rajaputhri Rahasyamu	Telugu	Taalachinantaa Thappaite	T. M. Ibrahim	T. M. Soundararajan
1957	Rani Lalithangi	Tamil	Bulbul Jodi Majaa	G. Ramanathan	S. C. Krishnan
1957	Samaya Sanjeevi	Tamil	Thiruvarul Thandhadhu	G. Ramanathan	
1957	Soubhagyavathi	Tamil	Singaara Velavane	Pendyala Nageswara Rao & M. S. Gnanamani	
1957	Soubhagyavathi	Tamil	Manjapoosi	Pendyala Nageswara Rao & M. S. Gnanamani	S. C. Krishnan
1957	Soubhagyavathi	Tamil	Chinna Maamaa Romba	Pendyala Nageswara Rao & M. S. Gnanamani	
1957	Vanangamudi	Tamil		G. Ramanathan	S. C. Krishnan
1957	Yaar Paiyyan	Tamil	Andha Naalum Vandhu Serum	S. Dakshinamurthi	
1958	Bommai Kalyanam	Tamil	Aasai Vachen Aasai Vachen	K. V. Mahadevan	Seerkazhi Govindarajan
1958	Maya Manithan	Tamil	Paakku Vetthala.... Iru Manasum Oru Manasai	G. Govindarajulu Naidu	S. V. Ponnusamy
1958	Nadodi Mannan	Tamil	Paaduppattal Thannaanle	N. S. Balakrishnan	
1958	Paanai Pidithaval Bhaagyasaali	Tamil	Pachadikkettha Kichadi Sambaa	S. V. Venkatraman & S. Rajeswara Rao	Thiruchi Loganathan
1958	Paattaliyin Sabatham	Tamil	Angiyodu Nijaar Anindhu Vandhaaye	O. P. Nayyar	P. Susheela
1958	Peria Koil	Tamil	Naan Poren Munnaale	K. V. Mahadevan	T. M. Soundararajan
1958	Peria Koil	Tamil	Vaazhanum Penngal Vaazhanum	K. V. Mahadevan	
1958	Thedi Vandha Selvam	Tamil	Poovaadai Nee Enakku	T. G. Lingappa	Seerkazhi Govindarajan
1958	Vanjikottai Valiban	Tamil	Vetrivel Veeravel	C. Ramchandra	Seerkazhi Govindarajan & Thiruchi Loganathan
1959	Amudhavalli	Tamil	Jilu Jilukkum Pachai Malai.... Chittukkuruvi Iva	Viswanathan–Ramamoorthy	A. P. Komala
1959	Aval Yaar	Tamil	Adakkiduven	S. Rajeswara Rao	S. C. Krishnan
1959	Aval Yaar	Tamil	Kannukkazhagaa Penngalai	S. Rajeswara Rao	Jikki
1959	Manimekalai	Tamil	Adikkudhu Adikkudhu Unnai Kandu	G. Ramanathan	V. T. Rajagopalan
1959	Manimekalai	Tamil	Raajaa Nee Thoongalaamaa	G. Ramanathan	
1959	Minnal Veeran	Tamil	Kokkarakko.... Kutta Veliyaakavaa	Vedha	S. C. Krishnan
1959	Pandithevan	Tamil	Kal Udaithu Malai Pilandhu	C. N. Pandurangan & Meenakshi Subramanyam	P. B. Sreenivas, A. G. Rathnamala, S. V. Ramanan & Gomathi
1959	Paththarai Maathu Thangam	Tamil	Manasa Nallaa Theriyaame	G. Govindarajulu Naidu & Tiruvenkadu Selvarathinam	
1959	Soubhagyavathi	Telugu	Singaara Nelavane	Pendyala Nageswara Rao	
1959	Sumangali	Tamil	Bodhai Seidha Velai Paadhai Maari Pocche	M. Ranga Rao	
1959	Veerapandiya Kattabomman	Tamil	Maattu Vandi Poottikkittu	G. Ramanathan	T. M. Soundararajan
1959	Vaazhkai Oppandham	Tamil	Kochimalai Kudagu Malai	Ghantasala	
1960	Adutha Veettu Penn	Tamil	Kaiyum Odala Kaalum Odala	P. Adinarayana Rao	S. C. Krishnan
1960	Mugguru Veerulu	Telugu	Iddarinee Kattukunte Intenandi	T. R. Pappa	P. B. Sreenivas & L. R. Eswari
1960	Nammina Bantu	Telugu	Alu Mogudu Pondu Andamoyi	S. Rajeswara Rao & Master Venu	P. Susheela & Swarnalatha
1960	Pattaliyin Vetri	Tamil	Pendaatti Purushanukku	S. Rajeswara Rao & Master Venu	P. Susheela & Swarnalatha
1960	Vijayapuri Veeran	Tamil	Kokkarikkanum	T. R. Pappa	S. C. Krishnan & L. R. Eswari
1961	Panithirai	Tamil	Maamiyaarukku Oru Seidhi	K. V. Mahadevan	Seerkazhi Govindarajan
1962	Vikramaadhithan	Tamil	Nilaiyaana Kalai Vaazhgave	S. Rajeswara Rao	P. Leela
1963	Punithavathi	Tamil	Adi Ammaa Ponne	Hussein Reddy	
1964	Magaley Un Samathu	Tamil	Avogulaamiyaa	G. K. Venkatesh	T. M. Soundararajan
1965	Maganey Kel	Tamil	Aattam Porandhadhu Munnaale	M. S. Viswanathan	
1971	Arutperunjothi	Tamil	Arutjothi Dheivam Ennnai Aandu Konda Dheivam	T. R. Pappa	
1971	Ilangeswaran	Tamil	Malar Maalai Kondaadi	S. M. Subbaiah Naidu	
1973	Arangetram	Tamil	Enadi Marumagale Unnai Evaradi Pesivittaar	V. Kumar	
1977	Sri Krishna Leela	Tamil	Anbe Uyarndhadhu Avaniyile	S. V. Venkatraman	Soolamangalam Rajalakshmi
