= Chakravarthi Thirumagal =

- Theatrical release poster
- Directed by: P. Neelakantan
- Written by: Elangovan (dialogues)
- Story by: P. A. Kumar
- Produced by: R. M. Ramanathan
- Starring: M. G. Ramachandran; Anjali Devi; P. S. Veerappa; S. Varalakshmi
- Cinematography: V. Ramamoorthy
- Edited by: R. Devarajan
- Music by: G. Ramanathan
- Production company: Uma Pictures
- Distributed by: A.L.S. Productions
- Release date: 18 January 1957
- Running time: 168 minutes
- Country: India
- Language: Tamil

Chakravarthi Thirumagal (transl. Princess) is a 1957 Indian Tamil language historical action film starring M. G. Ramachandran, Anjali Devi and S. Varalakshmi. The film, directed by P. Neelakantan, was released on 18 January 1957 and became a box office success.

The film features a damsel in distress scenario. A prince wins a competition over the right to marry a princess, but his would-be bride is kidnapped by one of his enemies. The prince has to rescue her.

== Plot ==
Prince Udhayasuryan wins a tough competition to marry Princess Kalamani. Durga and Bhairavan plot to ruin their lives. Durga plans to take the queen's place in order to live with Udhayasuryan. Meanwhile, Bhairavan abducts Kalamani from the palace. The rest of the film deals with Udhayasuryan foiling his enemies' plan in order to save the princess.

== Cast ==
Actor	Role
M. G. Ramachandran	Prince Udhayasuryan
Anjali Devi	Princess Kalamani
P. S. Veerappa	Bhairavan
S. Varalakshmi	Durga
N. S. Krishnan	Sokaka
T. A. Madhuram	Sokki
K. A. Thangavelu	
T. P. Muthulakshmi	Antharangam
G. Sakunthala	
E. R. Sahadevan	
Lakshmi Prabha	
E. V. Saroja	Dancer
R. Balasubramaniam	King

== Soundtrack ==
The music was composed by G. Ramanathan.

Song	Singers	Lyrics	Length
"Kaadhalenum Cholayile	Seerkazhi Govindarajan	Ku. Ma. Balasubramaniam	03:12
"Aada Vaanga Annaatthe"	Seerkazhi Govindarajan, Jikki & P. Leela	Ku. Ma. Balasubramaniam	04:24
"Ellai Illadha Inbatthile"	Seerkazhi Govindarajan & P. Leela	Ku. Ma. Balasubramaniam	03:26
"Porakkum Podhu Porandha Gunam"	Seerkazhi Govindarajan	Pattukkottai Kalyanasundaram	04:40
"Kannaalane Vaarunga"	Jikki	Ku. Ma. Balasubramaniam	03:07
"Sollaale Vilakka Mudiyale"	S. Varalakshmi & P. Leela	Ku. Sa. Krishnamoorthy	03:22
"Endhan Inbam Kollai Konda"	M. L. Vasanthakumari	Ku. Ma. Balasubramaniam	02:59
"Emaatram Thaana"	S. Varalakshmi	K. D. Santhanam	03:18
"Aththaanum Naandhane"	S. C. Krishnan & T. V. Rathnam	Thanjai N. Ramaiah Dass	02:09
"Ennam Ellaam Inba Kadhai"	P. Leela	Ku. Sa. Krishnamoorthy	02:58
"Nalangittu Paarpomadi"	S. Varalakshmi & A. P. Komala	K. D. Santhanam	03:23
"Seermevum Gurupaadham"	Seerkazhi Govindarajan & N. S. Krishnan	Clown Sundaram	03:23
"Dhilli Thulukkar Seidha"	Seerkazhi Govindarajan	Subramania Bharati	01:01

== Release ==
Chakravarthi Thirumagal was released on 18 January 1957, and became a success at the box office.
