= M. L. Vasanthakumari =

Indian singer (1928–1990)

Madras Lalithangi Vasanthakumari
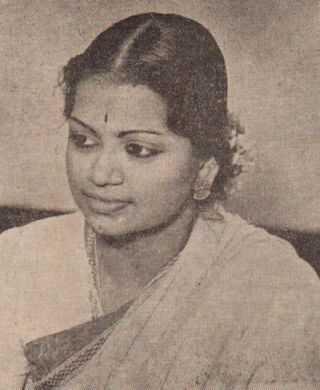
- MLV in late 1940s

Background information
- Born: 3 July 1928; Madras, Madras Presidency, British India
- Died: 31 October 1990 (aged 62) Chennai, Tamil Nadu, India
- Genres: Carnatic music – Indian Classical Music and Playback singing
- Occupation: Singer
- Years active: 1942–1990
- Labels: His Master's Voice, EMI, RPG, AVM Audio, Inreco, Vani, Amutham Inc, Doordarshan, Super Audio, Geethanjali, Kosmic Music, Charsur Digital Workshop etc.

Madras Lalithangi Vasanthakumari (3 July 1928 – 31 October 1990), known as M. L. Vasanthakumari and commonly referred to as MLV, was an Indian Carnatic musician and a playback singer in films across several South Asian languages.

Vasanthakumari and her contemporaries, D. K. Pattammal and M. S. Subbulakshmi, are often referred to as the female trinity of Carnatic music. A disciple of G. N. Balasubramaniam, she was the youngest of the established musicians of that era and the youngest female to receive the Sangita Kalanidhi award. In 1967, the government of India honoured her with the Padma Bhushan, the country's third-highest civilian award.

Vasanthakumari's notable career as a playback singer for films popularized lesser-known ragas, and her Ragam Thanam Pallavis were regarded as cerebral. Additionally, she popularized the compositions of the Haridasas. Her disciples include her daughter Srividya, Sudha Raghunathan, Charumathi Ramachandran, and A. Kanyakumari.

== Early life ==
Vasanthakumari was born into a musical family. Her father, Kuthanur Ayya Swamy Iyer, and her mother, Lalithangi, were both musicians. When Deshbandhu Chittaranjan Das died in 1925, Lalithangi composed a song as a tribute to his patriotism.

Vasanthakumari was educated in a convent school in Madras where she initially planned to pursue a career in medicine. However, her path took a turn when Carnatic musician G. N. Balasubramaniam, popularly known as GNB, became her guru. In Vasanthakumari's own words:

"My parents had rendered yeoman service to Carnatic music. They were instrumental in popularizing the compositions of Purandara Dasa in South India. Although they were not keen on my pursuing a career in music and instead provided me with a general education, the musical atmosphere at home gave me ample opportunity to practice vocal music. When G. N. Balasubramaniam heard me sing, he convinced my parents to allow him to tutor me. It is he who is responsible for the position I hold in the music world today."

== Performing and recording career ==
At the age of 12, Vasanthakumari debuted in 1940, accompanying her mother, Lalithangi in a recital. In 1942, she gave her first solo performance in Bengaluru and recorded her first 78-rpm disc. By 1950, she was regularly performing on stage.

=== Musical style ===
Vasanthakumari's style was influenced by her mentor G. N. Balasubramaniam. Musicologist Indira Menon noted that Vasanthakumari adopted Balasubramaniam’s approach of introducing a raga with a quick sketch across two octaves, followed by a more detailed elaboration. Menon also observed that she used vocal ornamentation (brigas) selectively and exercised restraint in her performance.

=== Purandaradasa tradition ===
Vasanthakumari's mother performed a repertoire of Purandaradasa kritis, many of which she taught to her daughter. Vasanthakumari later included these compositions in her performances, contributing to the wider dissemination of Purandara Dasa's Devaranamas. Her role has been compared to T. Brinda's role in popularizing Kshetrayya Padams and M. S. Subbalakshmi’s efforts with Annamacharya kritis.

=== Sindhu Bhairavi ===
Vasanthakumari helped popularize Narayana Teertha's Kalyana Gopalam and Purandaradasa's Venkatachala Nilayam in Sindhubhairavi raga. Hindustani maestro Bade Ghulam Ali Khan praised her for her music. Sudha Raghunathan, also a prominent Carnatic singer, once said, "MLV Amma told me that it was Bade Ghulam Ali Khan Saab who taught her the nuances of Sindhu Bhairavi in the Hindustani style."

=== Playback singing ===
By 1946, Vasanthakumari also became a playback singer. Her first successful performance was in the 1951 film Manamagal, where she sang Ellam Inbamayam in ragamalika and Subramania Bharathiyar's composition Chinnanchiru Kiliyae Kannamma. In the 1960 film Raja Desingu, she sang another ragamalika, Paarkadal Alaimele, which was well-received and later became popular in Bharatanatyam recitals. She would later sing these songs towards the end of her Carnatic music concerts, and several musicians include them in their repertoire today.

Vasanthakumari also sang Ayya Saami in the 1951 film, Or Iravu. This song was based on the song Gore Gore O Banke Chhore from the film 1950 Samaadhi, which was in turn based on the Latin American song Chico Chico from Puerto Rico, featured in the film Cuban Pete. In the 1952 film Thai Ullam, she sang Konjum Purave, which was based on the Hindi song Thandi Havayen. Other songs included Adisayam Vanathu Arivumayam, Senthamarai Kannanae, Vanna Tamizh, and Adum Arul Jothi in the films Vikramaadhithan, Vaira Maalai, Kaveriyin Kanavan and Meenda Sorgam. Each of these songs contained the Kalyani raga and were well-received.

Vasanthakumari sang the Dashaavataara songs for Bhookailas like Munneeta Pavalinchu, while Kumari Kamala danced in a classical style. Vasanthakumari would continue to sing in films until 1970.

=== Accompanists ===
Mridangam maestro Palghat Mani Iyer made an exception to his decision to not accompany a female performer and later accompanied Vasanthakumari for concerts. Other accompanists include Mannargudi Easwaran, Srimushnam V. Raja Rao, Seerkazhi J. Skandaprasad, Thiruvarur Bakthavathsalam, R. Ramesh, Karaikudi Krishnamurthy, G. Harishankar (Kanjira), Dwaram Mangathayaru (Violin), Kanyakumari (Violin).

== Family ==
Vasanthakumari married Kalaimamani Vikatam R. Krishnamurthy in 1951. They had a son, Krishnamurthy Sankararaman, and a daughter, Srividya. Srividya became an actress in Tamil and Malayalam films.

== Disciples ==
Saraswathi Srinivasan (b. 1936) was the first disciple of Vasanthakumari. After her marriage, the duo performed in concerts together.

== Awards ==
Year	Award	Awarded by
1967	Padma Bhushan	Third-highest civilian award granted by the government of India
1970	Sangeet Natak Akademi Award	Sangeet Natak Akademi, India
1976	Doctoral degree for her work about Purandaradasa's contributions to music	Mysore University
1977	Sangeetha Kalanidhi (Highest accolade in the field of Carnatic music)	Music Academy, Madras
1977	Isai Perarignar	Tamil Isai Sangam, Madras
1987	Sangeetha Kalasikhamani	Indian Fine Arts Society, Chennai

== Death ==
In 1990 Vasanthakumari died of cancer at the age of 62.

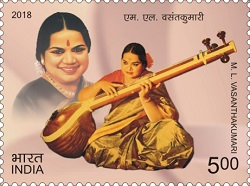
Vasanthakumari on a 2018 stamp of India

=== Collaborations with music composers ===
Vasanthakumari worked with C. R. Subbaraman, S. M. Subbaiah Naidu, G. Ramanathan, S. Dakshinamurthi, K. V. Mahadevan, Vedha, V. Nagayya, Pendyala Nageshwara Rao, T. Chalapathi Rao, Viswanathan–Ramamoorthy, S. Rajeswara Rao, R. Sudarsanam, R. Govardhanam, T. R. Pappa, S. V. Venkatraman, Kunnakudi Venkatrama Iyer, G. Aswathama, T. A. Kalyanam, M. S. Gnanamani, C. N. Pandurangan, C. S. Jayaraman, G. Govindarajulu Naidu, T. G. Lingappa, K. G. Moorthy, Ghantasala, Master Venu, G. Aswathama, V. Dakshinamoorthy, G. Devarajan, K. Raghavan and Shankar–Jaikishan.

=== Collaborations with playback singers ===
Vasanthakumari sang duets mostly with Thiruchi Loganathan, Seerkazhi Govindarajan and A. M. Rajah. Others are M. K. Thyagaraja Bhagavathar, V. N. Sundaram, T. R. Mahalingam, T. A. Mothi, C. R. Subburaman, C. S. Jayaraman, Ghantasala, G. K. Venkatesh, T. M. Soundararajan, P. B. Sreenivas, K. S. George, V. Dakshinamoorthy, and K. J. Yesudas.

She also sang duets with female singers, most notably with P. Leela and N. L. Ganasaraswathi. Others are A. P. Komala, T. S. Bagavathi, Soolamangalam Rajalakshmi, Jikki, T. V. Rathnam, Radha Jayalakshmi, P. A. Periyanayaki, P. Bhanumathi, K. Jamuna Rani and A. G. Rathnamala.

Year	Film	Language	Song	Music	Co-singer
1948	Krishna Bakthi	Tamil	Raadhaa Samedhaa Krishnaa	S. V. Venkatraman and Kunnakudi Venkatrama Iyer	
1948	Krishna Bakthi	Tamil	Endha Vedugo O Raagavaa	S. V. Venkatraman and Kunnakudi Venkatrama Iyer	
1948	Raja Mukthi	Tamil	Kulakkodi Thazhaikka	C. R. Subburaman	
1948	Raja Mukthi	Tamil	Aaraaro Nee Aaraaro	C. R. Subburaman	
1948	Raja Mukthi	Tamil	Ingum Angum Engum Inbame	C. R. Subburaman	M. K. Thyagaraja Bhagavathar
1948	Raja Mukthi	Tamil	Enna Aanandham	C. R. Subburaman	M. K. Thyagaraja Bhagavathar
1948	Raja Mukthi	Tamil	Sandhoshamaai Anbar Varuvaaradi	C. R. Subburaman	P. Bhanumathi
1949	Kanniyin Kaadhali	Tamil	Puvi Raajaa	S. M. Subbaiah Naidu and C. R. Subburaman	Thiruchi Loganathan
1949	Kanniyin Kaadhali	Tamil	Kalaivaaniye Nee	S. M. Subbaiah Naidu and C. R. Subburaman	
1949	Kanniyin Kaadhali	Tamil	Kaaranam Theriyammal	S. M. Subbaiah Naidu and C. R. Subburaman	
1949	Mayavathi	Tamil	Maane En Prema Raani	G. Ramanathan	T. R. Mahalingam
1949	Mayavathi	Tamil	Vaaraai En Inba Vaazhve	G. Ramanathan	
1949	Mayavathi	Tamil	Aahaa Thanimai Tharum Inbam	G. Ramanathan	
1949	Mayavathi	Tamil	Alli Malaraayirundhen	G. Ramanathan	
1949	Mayavathi	Tamil	Varuvano Madhivadhanan	G. Ramanathan	
1949	Mayavathi	Tamil	Jeyame En Vaazhvile	G. Ramanathan	
1949	Nallathambi	Tamil	Gaanalolan Madhanagopaalan	S. M. Subbaiah Naidu and C. R. Subburaman	
1949	Nam Naadu	Tamil	Mosam Pogadhe Nee	G. Govindarajulu Naidu and Purushotham	
1949	Nam Naadu	Tamil	Enthan Mana Ullaasam	G. Govindarajulu Naidu and Purushotham	
1949	Nam Naadu	Tamil	Enadhu Ennam Veene	G. Govindarajulu Naidu and Purushotham	
1949	Nam Naadu	Tamil	Vedhanai Ilaa Logam	G. Govindarajulu Naidu and Purushotham	
1949	Nam Naadu	Tamil	Maname Enna Pedhamai	G. Govindarajulu Naidu and Purushotham	
1949	Pavalakodi	Tamil	Kandeepan Maithunaa	C. R. Subburaman	
1949	Pavalakodi	Tamil	Naane Vendinen	C. R. Subburaman	
1949	Pavalakodi	Tamil	Ini Nammodellaam	C. R. Subburaman	
1949	Pavalakodi	Tamil	Unathu Pugazh Paaduven	C. R. Subburaman	
1949	Vazhkai	Tamil	Gopaalanodu Naan Aaduvene	R. Sudarsanam	
1950	Beedala Patlu	Telugu	Yauvaname Aahaa Yauvaname	S. M. Subbaiah Naidu	
1950	Beedala Patlu	Telugu	Sarasaku Raade Aane	S. M. Subbaiah Naidu	
1950	Ezhai Padum Padu	Tamil	Yauvaname Aahaa Yauvaname	S. M. Subbaiah Naidu	
1950	Ezhai Padum Padu	Tamil	Kannan Mana Nilaiye	S. M. Subbaiah Naidu	
1950	Ezhai Padum Padu	Tamil	Vaanamudhe Ondraai	S. M. Subbaiah Naidu	Thiruchi Loganathan and P. A. Periyanayaki
1950	Manthiri Kumari	Tamil	Isai Kalaiye Inidhaana	G. Ramanathan	
1950	Manthiri Kumari	Tamil	Kaadhal Baliyaagi	G. Ramanathan	
1950	Manthiri Kumari	Tamil	Manam Pola Vaazhvu Peruvome	G. Ramanathan	Jikki
1950	Manthiri Kumari	Tamil	Aahaahaahaa Vaazhvile	G. Ramanathan	
1950	Manthiri Kumari	Tamil	Ennum Pozhuthil Inbam	G. Ramanathan	
1950	Parijatham	Tamil	Niyaayam Alladi Bhaamaa	S. V. Venkatraman and C. R. Subburaman	
1950	Parijatham	Tamil	Piraana Naathanae	S. V. Venkatraman and C. R. Subburaman	
1950	Parijatham	Tamil	Anbinil Yaavume.... Thulasi Jegan Maathaa	S. V. Venkatraman and C. R. Subburaman	
1950	Parijatham	Tamil	Pugazhnthu Pugazhnthu Uraikka	S. V. Venkatraman and C. R. Subburaman	
1950	Parijatham	Tamil	Vantharul Endruraippai	S. V. Venkatraman and C. R. Subburaman	
1950	Prasanna	Malayalam	Kalaanikethe Keralamaathe	M. S. Gnanamani	
1950	Prasanna	Malayalam	Gaanamohana Hare	M. S. Gnanamani	
1950	Prasanna	Malayalam	Jaathivairam Neethirahitham	M. S. Gnanamani	
1950	Prasanna	Malayalam	Thakarukayo Sakalamen	M. S. Gnanamani	
1950	Vijayakumari	Tamil	Geethaanandham Perinbam	C. R. Subburaman	P. Leela
1951	Manamagal	Tamil	Chinnanciru Kiliye Kannammaa	C. R. Subburaman	V. N. Sundaram
1951	Manamagal	Tamil	Ellaam Inbamayam	C. R. Subburaman	P. Leela
1951	Manamagal	Tamil	Aayirathu Tholaayirathu	C. R. Subburaman	P. Leela
1951	Manamagal	Tamil	Paaviyinum Padu Paavi	C. R. Subburaman	V. N. Sundaram
1951	Manamagal	Tamil	Iru Kaadhalar Magizhndhe	C. R. Subburaman	C. R. Subburaman
1951	Mayamalai	Tamil		P. Adinarayana Rao	
1951	Navvite Navaratnalu	Telugu	Marubal Kavadhe Meera	Aswathama Gudimetla and G. Ramanathan	
1951	Navvite Navaratnalu	Telugu	Uyyaala Loogena O Manasam	Aswathama Gudimetla and G. Ramanathan	
1951	Navvite Navaratnalu	Telugu	Telirekhalu Virise Thurupudisa	Aswathama Gudimetla and G. Ramanathan	
1951	Navvite Navaratnalu	Telugu	Saanthiye Ledhaa Naaku	Aswathama Gudimetla and G. Ramanathan	
1951	Navvite Navaratnalu	Telugu	Sri Rajarajesvari Sritajanavandita	Aswathama Gudimetla and G. Ramanathan	
1951	Or Iravu	Tamil	Ayyaa Saami Avoji Saami	R. Sudarsanam	
1951	Or Iravu	Tamil	Boologam Thanai Kaana Varuveer	R. Sudarsanam	T. S. Bagavathi
1951	Pelli Kooturu	Telugu	Veera Jaajula Valape	C. R. Subburaman	C. R. Subburaman
1951	Pelli Kooturu	Telugu	Anta Premamayam	C. R. Subburaman	P. Leela
1951	Pelli Kooturu	Telugu	1950 Ki 60 Ki Ento Teda	C. R. Subburaman	A. P. Komala
1951	Pelli Kooturu	Telugu	Paapula Loka Dupaapi	C. R. Subburaman	C. R. Subburaman
1951	Pelli Kooturu	Telugu		C. R. Subburaman	C. R. Subburaman
1951	Rajambal	Tamil	Vaazhvu Uyara Vendum	M. S. Gnanamani	
1951	Rajambal	Tamil	Ahaa Haa Manaiviyaaven	M. S. Gnanamani	
1951	Rajambal	Tamil	Theeraadha Thunbam Thaanaa	M. S. Gnanamani	
1951	Saudamini	Tamil	Anbe En Sivame Aandarulvaaye	S. V. Venkatraman	
1951	Saudamini	Tamil	Maara Sundara Maadhu Ivale	S. V. Venkatraman	
1951	Soudamini	Telugu	Elukkona Ra	S. V. Venkatraman	
1951	Tilottama	Telugu		P. Adinarayana Rao	
1952	Andhaman Kaidhi	Tamil	Kaani Nilam Vendum Paraasakthi	G. Govindarajulu Naidu	C. S. Jayaraman
1952	En Thangai	Tamil	Dheena Dhayaabari Thaaye	C. N. Pandurangan	
1952	Kanchana	Tamil	Maye Thvam Yaahi	S. M. Subbaiah Naidu	
1952	Kanchana	Tamil	Shivakameshwari Chintaye	S. M. Subbaiah Naidu	
1952	Kanchana	Tamil	Maye Thvam Yaahi	S. M. Subbaiah Naidu	
1952	Kanchana	Tamil	Shivakameshwari Chintaye	S. M. Subbaiah Naidu	
1952	Kanjana	Malayalam	Maye Thvam Yaahi	S. M. Subbaiah Naidu	
1952	Kanjana	Malayalam	Shivakameshwari Chintaye	S. M. Subbaiah Naidu	
1952	Moondru Pillaigal	Tamil	Antha Raama Sowndharyam	P. S. Anantharaman and M. D. Parthasarathy	A. P. Komala
1952	Mr. Sampat	Hindi	Manchi Dinamu Nede	B. S. Kalla and Emani Sankara Sastry	
1952	Mugguru Kodukkulu	Telugu	Aaraaghu Ra Muni	K. G. Moorthy	N. L. Ganasaraswathi
1952	Panam	Tamil	Ezhai Nin Kovilai	Viswanathan–Ramamoorthy	G. K. Venkatesh
1952	Panam	Tamil	Kudumbatthin Vilakku	Viswanathan–Ramamoorthy	
1952	Parasakthi	Tamil	Vaazhga Vaazhgave Vaazhgave	R. Sudarsanam	
1952	Penn Manam	Tamil	Kanavilum Maraven	Kunnakudi Venkatarama Iyer	
1952	Penn Manam	Tamil	Vazhvile Vaazhvile	Kunnakudi Venkatarama Iyer	Madhavapeddi Satyam
1952	Penn Manam	Tamil	Sugamedhu Vaazhvile	Kunnakudi Venkatarama Iyer	Madhavapeddi Satyam
1952	Puratchi Veeran	Tamil	Kaaranam Theriyaamal	Shankar–Jaikishan	
1952	Shyamala	Tamil	Ambaa Aadhi Sakthi Jegadhaambaa	G. Ramanathan, T. V. Raju and S. B. Dinakar Rao	
1952	Thai Ullam	Tamil	Konjum Puraave	G. Ramanathan	
1952	Thai Ullam	Tamil	Vellai Thamarai Poovil	G. Ramanathan	
1952	Thai Ullam	Tamil	Kovil Muzhuthum Kanden	G. Ramanathan	
1952	Thai Ullam	Tamil	Kathayai Kelada	G. Ramanathan	
1952	Velaikari Magal	Tamil	Anbe Endhan Aaruyire Azhaadhe	C. R. Subburaman and S. Dakshinamurthi	
1952	Velaikari Magal	Tamil	Mudinthathe En Vazhvu	C. R. Subburaman and S. Dakshinamurthi	
1952	Velaikari Magal	Tamil	Pagalellam Velai Seithe	C. R. Subburaman and S. Dakshinamurthi	K. Devanarayanan
1953	Aasai Magan	Tamil	Kalaigal Migundha Engal	V. Dakshinamoorthy	P. Leela
1953	Aasai Magan	Tamil	Neeye Arul Velavane	V. Dakshinamoorthy	
1953	Aashadeepam	Malayalam	Janani Jayikka Neenal	V. Dakshinamoorthy	P. Leela
1953	Aashadeepam	Malayalam	Sharanam Mayilvaahanaa	V. Dakshinamoorthy	
1953	Ammalakkalu	Telugu	Nee Kosam	C. R. Subburaman	Pithapuram Nageswara Rao
1953	Anbu	Tamil	Adavare Naattile	T. R. Pappa	A. M. Rajah
1953	Anbu	Tamil	Isaippaadi	T. R. Pappa	
1953	En Veedu	Tamil	Konjum Mozhi Maindharkale	V. Nagayya and A. Rama Rao	T. A. Mothi
1953	Gumastha	Tamil	Aiyavin Penndattikku	G. Ramanathan, V. Nagayya, and C. N. Pandurangan	K. R. Chellamuthu
1953	Gumastha	Tamil	Dance Baby Dance	G. Ramanathan, V. Nagayya, and C. N. Pandurangan	
1953	Inspector	Tamil	Varuvaai Mana Mohanaa	G. Ramanathan	V. N. Sundaram
1953	Inspector	Tamil	Madhana Singaara Neelaa	G. Ramanathan	
1953	Inspector	Tamil	Moodiyirundha En Vizhiyinul	G. Ramanathan	
1953	Inspector	Telugu	Marupayena Mohana	G. Ramanathan	
1953	Inspector	Telugu	Mara Sukumara	G. Ramanathan	
1953	Inspector	Telugu	Moodapa Dhinana Muddulaveena	G. Ramanathan	
1953	Jatagam	Tamil	Velan Varuvaanodi	R. Govardhanam	
1953	Kangal	Tamil	Inba Veenaiyai Meettudhu	S. V. Venkatraman	
1953	Kangal	Tamil	Kann Kanda Deivame	S. V. Venkatraman	
1953	Kangal	Tamil	Annai Karamena Nammai	S. V. Venkatraman	
1953	Kangal	Tamil	Varungkaala Thalaivan Neeye	S. V. Venkatraman	
1953	Kodarikam	Telugu	Illalu Illalu	C. N. Pandurangan	
1953	Kodarikam	Telugu	Mahaa Ganapathi Gajaananaa	C. N. Pandurangan	
1953	Mamiyar	Tamil	Penn Ivale Miga	C. N. Pandurangan	
1953	Mamiyar	Tamil	Mahaa Ganapathi Gajaananaa	C. N. Pandurangan	
1953	Manam Pola Mangalyam	Tamil	Solai Naduve Odi	A. Rama Rao	
1953	Manidhanum Mirugamum	Tamil	Inbakuyil Kuralinimai	G. Govindarajulu Naidu	A. M. Rajah
1953	Manidhanum Mirugamum	Tamil	Imayamalai Chaaralile	G. Govindarajulu Naidu	
1953	Manithan	Tamil	Kuyile Unakku	G. Ramanathan	
1953	Marumagal	Tamil	Nianikkira Maaadhiri Ellaam	C. R. Subburaman	T. R. Ramachandran
1953	Naa Illu	Telugu	Adigadigo Gagana Seema	V. Nagayya and A. Rama Rao	T. A. Mothi
1953	Naa Illu	Telugu	Raara Maa Intidaka	V. Nagayya and A. Rama Rao	
1953	Naalvar	Tamil	Irul Soozhum Vaanil	K. V. Mahadevan	
1953	Naalvar	Tamil	Inbam Kolludhe	K. V. Mahadevan	
1953	Naalvar	Tamil	Vaana Veedhiyil Parandhiduvom	K. V. Mahadevan	Thiruchi Loganathan
1953	Naam	Tamil		C. S. Jayaraman	
1953	Prapancham	Telugu		M. S. Gnanamani and T. Poornananda	A. M. Rajah
1953	Prapancham	Telugu	Kalaye Navakalaye	M. S. Gnanamani and T. Poornananda	
1953	Ulagam	Tamil	Un Kaadhalaal En Anbellaam	M. S. Gnanamani	A. M. Rajah
1953	Ulagam	Tamil	En Jeevanile	M. S. Gnanamani	
1953	Vazha Pirandhaval	Tamil	Indhiya Naadu Nam Indhiya Naadu	S. Rajeswara Rao and G. Ramanathan	
1954	Ammaiyappan	Tamil	Kaadhal Thuraiye Pudhumai Kanave	T. R. Pappa	
1954	Ammaiyappan	Tamil	Chinna Pudhu Malare	T. R. Pappa	
1954	Ammaiyappan	Tamil	Sidhaindhadhe.... Manamogana Jeevan	T. R. Pappa	S. Varalakshmi
1954	Ammaiyappan	Tamil	Poojaikku.... Pillaiyaare Thulli	T. R. Pappa	
1954	Ammaiyappan	Tamil	Neelakadal Paaru Paappaa	T. R. Pappa	
1954	Ammaiyappan	Tamil	Kaadhal Thuraiye Pudhumai Kanave	T. R. Pappa	
1954	Bedara Kannappa	Kannada	Daari Kaadu Naa Balu Nonde	R. Sudarsanam	
1954	Kanavu	Tamil	Kannaana Thaai Naadae	G. Ramanathan and V. Dakshinamoorthy	
1954	Kanavu	Tamil	Eliyorku Suga Vaazhvu Edhu	G. Ramanathan and V. Dakshinamoorthy	
1954	Kanavu	Tamil	Engume Thai Pongal	G. Ramanathan and V. Dakshinamoorthy	
1954	Kudumbam	Tamil	Pandigai Dhinamithadah	Pendyala Nageswara Rao	
1954	Menarikam	Telugu		Pendyala Nageswara Rao	
1954	Pudhu Yugam	Tamil	Kalaiye Puviyaarai Kavarum	G. Ramanathan	
1954	Ratha Kanneer	Tamil	Kadhavai Saathadi	C. S. Jayaraman	
1954	Ratha Kanneer	Tamil	Aalaiyin Sangge Nee Oothaayo	C. S. Jayaraman	
1954	Ratha Paasam	Tamil	Nilaiyaana Inbam Manavaalan Anbe	M. K. Athmanathan and A. V. Natarajan	
1954	Kalahasti Mahatyam	Telugu	Choochi Choochi	R. Sudarsanam	
1954	Kalahasti Mahatyam	Telugu	Chaalu Chaalu Naa Mohana	R. Sudarsanam	
1954	Thookku Thookki	Tamil	Vaaranam Aayiram Soozha Valam Seidhu	G. Ramanathan	P. Leela
1954	Thuli Visham	Tamil	Nandraaga Vaazha Vendum	K. N. Dandayudhapani Pillai	
1954	Vaira Malai	Tamil	Vanjamidho Vaanchaiyidho	Viswanathan–Ramamoorthy	Thiruchi Loganathan
1954	Vaira Malai	Tamil	Koovaamal Koovum Kogilam	Viswanathan–Ramamoorthy	Thiruchi Loganathan
1954	Vaira Malai	Tamil	Unnai Ennum Podhe	Viswanathan–Ramamoorthy	
1954	Vaira Malai	Tamil	Senthamarai Kannane	Viswanathan–Ramamoorthy	
1955	Adarsha Sathi	Telugu	Parameshane Shiraverida	R. Sudarsanam and R. Govardhanam	
1955	Kalvanin Kadhali	Tamil	Tamil Thirunaadu Thannai Petra	G. Govindarajulu Naidu	N. L. Ganasaraswathi
1955	Kaveri	Tamil	Manjal Veyyil Maalaiyile	G. Ramanathan	C. S. Jayaraman
1955	Kaveri	Tamil	Manadhinile Naan Konda	Viswanathan–Ramamoorthy	
1955	Koteeswaran	Tamil	Ennudalum Ullak Kaadhalum Unakke	S. V. Venkatraman	
1955	Maheswari	Tamil	Andha NaaLum Endha Naalo	G. Ramanathan	
1955	Ulagam Palavitham	Tamil	Adimaiyendre Ennathe Penne	N. S. Balakrishnan	
1955	Valliyin Selvan	Tamil	Kannin Maniye Vaa	Parur S. Anantharaman	
1955	Valliyin Selvan	Tamil	Vilaiyaadum Dheivamadi	Parur S. Anantharaman	T. V. Rathnam
1955	Vijaya Gauri	Telugu	Andala Sandadilo	G. Ramanathan	A. M. Rajah
1954	Vedan Kannappa	Tamil	Thedi Thedi Naan Manam Nondhen	R. Sudarsanam	
1956	Amara Deepam	Tamil	Enge Maraindhanayo	T. Chalapathi Rao and G. Ramanathan	
1956	Chori Chori	Hindi	Theem Theem	Shankar–Jaikishan	
1956	Kaalam Maari Pochu	Tamil	Ennamadhellaam Neeye Niraindhu	Master Venu	
1956	Kannin Manigal	Tamil	Nalla Veenai Idhe Mannile	S. V. Venkatraman	
1956	Kannin Manigal	Tamil	Velli Nilavinile	S. V. Venkatraman	
1956	Kannin Manigal	Tamil	Aaraaro Aasai Kanmaniye	S. V. Venkatraman	
1956	Kannin Manigal	Tamil	Anbin Dheepamidhe	S. V. Venkatraman	
1956	Koodappirappu	Malayalam	Alarsharaparithaapam	K. Raghavan	
1956	Koodappirappu	Malayalam	Manivarnane Innu Njan	K. Raghavan	
1956	Kula Dheivam	Tamil	Thaaye Yasodha Undhan	R. Sudarsanam	
1956	Madurai Veeran	Tamil	Aadal Kaaneero	G. Ramanathan	
1956	Madurai Veeran	Tamil	Senthamizhaa Ezhundhu	G. Ramanathan	
1956	Naga Devathai	Tamil		Ghantasala	
1956	Nagula Chavithi	Telugu	Marubal Kavadhe Meera	Ghantasala	
1956	Ondre Kulam	Tamil	Anda Pagiranda Akilandeswari	S. V. Venkatraman and M. V. Ranga Rao	
1956	Ondre Kulam	Tamil	Thiruvarul Purivaai Jaganmaathaa	S. V. Venkatraman and M. V. Ranga Rao	
1956	Sahasra Veerudu	Telugu	Aatal Kanalero Maa Aatal Kanalero	G. Ramanathan	
1956	Sahasra Veerudu	Telugu	Andhamula Rashi Neevoyi	G. Ramanathan	
1956	Punniyavathi	Tamil	Kani Voorum Amudhaana Idhayam	V. Dakshinamoorthy	
1956	Raja Rani	Tamil	Vaanga Vaanga ... Indriravu Miga Nandriravu	T. R. Pappa	S. V. Ponnusamy
1956	Raja Rani	Tamil	Manippuraa Pudhu Manippuraa	T. R. Pappa	
1956	Raja Rani	Tamil	Inba Nan Naalidhe	T. R. Pappa	
1956	Thaaikkuppin Thaaram	Tamil	Naadu Sezhithida NaaLum Uzhaithida	K. V. Mahadevan	
1957	Bhale Ammayilu	Telugu	Gopaala Jaagela Raa	S. Rajeswara Rao and S. Hanumantha Rao	P. Leela
1957	Bhale Ammayilu	Telugu	Theem Thaam Thirana (Thillana)	S. Rajeswara Rao and S. Hanumantha Rao	T. V. Rathnam
1957	Chakravarthi Thirumagal	Tamil	Enthan Ullam Kollai Kolla	G. Ramanathan	
1957	Iru Sagodharigal	Tamil	Thaaye Un Seyalallavo	S. Rajeswara Rao	P. Leela
1957	Iru Sagodharigal	Tamil	Theem Thaam Thirana (Thillana)	S. Rajeswara Rao	T. V. Rathnam
1957	Karpukkarasi	Tamil	Kaniyo Paago Karkando	G. Ramanathan	P. B. Sreenivas
1957	Karpukkarasi	Tamil	Vizhiyodu Vilaiyaadum	G. Ramanathan	P. Leela
1957	Manamagan Thevai	Tamil	Vanthaal Varattum Podi	G. Ramanathan	
1957	Maya Bajaar	Tamil	Chellamudan Devarkalum Nallaasi	Ghantasala and S. Rajeswara Rao	
1957	Mayabazar	Kannada	Srisuraru Thamadhalu	Ghantasala and S. Rajeswara Rao	
1957	Mayabazar	Telugu	Srikarulu Devathalu	Ghantasala and S. Rajeswara Rao	
1957	Nala Damayanthi	Telugu	Jaali Chpppavadelara	B. Gopalam	
1957	Rajaputhri Rahasyamu	Telugu	Sreeramu Meedhane Perasha	G. Ramanathan	
1957	Rani Lalithangi	Tamil	Kannaale Mannaadhi Mannarum	G. Ramanathan	
1957	Sati Anasuya	Telugu	Maa Roopa Nava Shobana	Ghantasala	
1957	Soubhagyavathi	Tamil	Matha Maragadha Shyaamaa	Pendyala Nageswara Rao	
1957	Soubhagyavathi	Telugu	Matha Maragadha Shyaamaa	Pendyala Nageswara Rao	
1957	Thalavanchani Veerudu	Telugu	Raa Raa Raa	G. Ramanathan	
1957	Vanangamudi	Tamil	Siramathil.... Vaa Vaa Vaa	G. Ramanathan	
1957	Varudu Kavali	Telugu	Nandasuthudu Andam Chandam	G. Ramanathan	
1958	Baktha Ravana	Tamil	Dheva Mahadheva	R. Sudarsanam and R. Govardhanam	
1958	Bhookailas	Telugu	Dheva Mahadheva	R. Sudarsanam and R. Govardhanam	
1958	Bhookailas	Telugu	Munneeta Pavalinchu	R. Sudarsanam and R. Govardhanam	
1958	Bhookailas	Kannada	Dheva Mahadheva	R. Sudarsanam and R. Govardhanam	
1958	Bhookailas	Kannada	Ksheeraabdhi Varadhaama Naga Sayana	R. Sudarsanam and R. Govardhanam	
1958	Kanniyin Sabatham	Tamil	Attatthil Sirandhadhu Pitthalaattam	T. G. Lingappa	Soolamangalam Rajalakshmi
1958	Kanniyin Sabatham	Tamil	Solla Theriyaamal	T. G. Lingappa	
1958	Mangalya Bhagyam	Tamil	Nenjathile Achcham Illaadhavar	G. Ramanathan	P. Leela
1958	Mangalya Bhagyam	Tamil	Anusooya Kadhaakaalatchebam	G. Ramanathan	Seerkazhi Govindarajan, A. P. Komala, K. Jamuna Rani and A. G. Rathnamala
1958	Mangalya Bhagyam	Tamil	Annaiye Paraasakthi	G. Ramanathan	
1958	Sati Anasuya	Tamil	Maa Roopa Nava Shobana	Ghantasala	
1958	Uthama Illalu	Telugu	Veyinola Koniyaru Rasakalpame	G. Ramanathan and M. S. Raju	P. Leela
1959	Chathurangamm	Malayalam	Kaatte Va Kadale	G. Devarajan	
1959	Chathurangamm	Malayalam	Odakkuzhalum	G. Devarajan	
1959	Chathurangamm	Malayalam	Kaatte Va Kadale Va	G. Devarajan	K. S. George
1959	Jayabheri	Telugu	Neeventa Nerajaa Navauraa	Pendyala Nageswara Rao	
1959	Kalaivaanan	Tamil	Kaadhal Silai Aadudhe	Pendyala Nageswara Rao	
1959	Kalyanikku Kalyanam	Tamil	Aanandham Indru Aarambam	G. Ramanathan	P. Leela
1959	Kaveriyin Kanavan	Tamil	Vannatamizh Sornakili	K. V. Mahadevan	
1959	Krishna Leelalu	Telugu	Thaalalenuraa Thaginadaanaraa	S. Dakshinamurthi	
1959	Mamiyar Mechina Marumagal	Tamil	Pathu Viral Modhiram	R. Sudarsanam	
1959	Mamiyar Mechina Marumagal	Tamil	Ranga Ranga Ranga	R. Sudarsanam	Seerkazhi Govindarajan
1959	Mamiyar Mechina Marumagal	Tamil	Maithunare Maithunare	R. Sudarsanam	A. P. Komala
1959	Mamiyar Mechina Marumagal	Tamil	Kanna Vaa Vaa	R. Sudarsanam	
1959	Mamiyar Mechina Marumagal	Tamil	Inge Irupadhaa	R. Sudarsanam	
1959	Mamiyar Mechina Marumagal	Tamil	Ilavu Kaaththa Kili Pol	R. Sudarsanam	
1959	Manimekalai	Tamil	PazhangkAla Thamizharin Vaazhkai Murai	G. Ramanathan	N. L. Ganasaraswathi
1959	Minnal Veeran	Tamil	Manamirunthaal	Vedha	P. Leela
1959	Orey Vazhi	Tamil	Kalvi Kalvi Endru Paadu	R. Govardhanam	P. Leela
1959	Pennkulathin Ponvilakku	Tamil	Kadavul Padaikkavillai	Master Venu	P. Leela
1959	President Panchatcharam	Tamil	Oli Padaitha Kanninaayi	G. Ramanathan	Radha Jayalakshmi
1959	Thanga Padhumai	Tamil	Varugiraal Unnai Thedi	Viswanathan–Ramamoorthy	Soolamangalam Rajalakshmi
1959	Vachina Kodalu Nachindi	Telugu	Pahimam Jayajaya	S. Dakshinamurthi	
1959	Vachina Kodalu Nachindi	Telugu	Pahimam Saranantimamma	S. Dakshinamurthi	Ghantasala and Jikki
1960	Mannathi Mannan	Tamil	Kalaiyodu Kalandhadhu Unmai	Viswanathan–Ramamoorthy	
1960	Mannathi Mannan	Tamil	Aadadha Manamum Undo	Viswanathan–Ramamoorthy	T. M. Soundararajan
1960	Meenda Sorgam	Tamil	Aadum Arul Jothi	T. Chalapathi Rao	Seerkazhi Govindarajan
1960	Parthiban Kanavu	Tamil	Andhi Mayanguthadi	Vedha	
1960	Parthiban Kanavu	Tamil	Vadiveru Thirisoolam Thondrum	Vedha	
1960	Parthiban Kanavu	Tamil	Munnam Avanudaya Naamam Kettaal	Vedha	
1960	Petra Manam	Tamil	Sindhanai Seiyadaa	S. Rajeswara Rao	Sivaji Ganesan (dialogues)
1960	Raja Bakthi	Tamil	Karka Kasadara Katraapin	G. Govindarajulu Naidu	
1960	Raja Desingu	Tamil	Paakkadal Alai Mele	G. Ramanathan	
1960	Seetha	Malayalam	Kanne Nukaru Swargasukham	V. Dakshinamoorthy	
1960	Thilakam	Tamil	Kaathirundha Kannukku	R. Sudarsanam	
1960	Thilakam	Tamil	Manasukkulle Maraichu Vaikka	R. Sudarsanam	Seerkazhi Govindarajan
1960	Thilakam	Tamil	Ezhaikkum Vaazhvukkum	R. Sudarsanam	Seerkazhi Govindarajan and T. S. Bagavathi
1961	Desinguraju Katha	Telugu	Pala Kadali Meedha	Pamarthi	
1961	Sri Kanyaka Parameswari Mahatmyam	Telugu	Virahini Ninu Kore	R. Sudarsanam	Soolamangalam Rajalakshmi
1961	Kongunattu Thangam	Tamil	Irundhum Illaadhavare	K. V. Mahadevan	
1961	Krishna Kuchela	Malayalam	Varnippathengine	K. Raghavan	P. Leela
1961	Malliyam Mangalam	Tamil	Avarindri Naanillai Kanne	T. A. Kalyanam	
1961	Sthree Hrudayam	Telugu	Neeve Jagajyothi	Nityanand	Seerkazhi Govindarajan
1961	Ummini Thanka	Malayalam	Geethopadesham	V. Dakshinamoorthy	V. Dakshinamoorthy and P. Leela
1962	Ekaika Veerudu	Telugu	Nanukora Thagadidi Vinumaa	S. P. Kodandapani	
1962	Ekaika Veerudu	Telugu	Hrdayamulu Pulakinnchavo	S. P. Kodandapani	Seerkazhi Govindarajan
1962	Vikramaadhithan	Tamil	Adhisayam Ivanadhu	S. Rajeswara Rao	
1963	Susheela	Malayalam	Thaalolam Thankam Thaalolam	V. Dakshinamoorthy	
1964	Veeranganai	Tamil	Angamellam Sornthu Vaada	Vedha	P. Leela and K. J. Yesudas
1965	Maganey Kel	Tamil	Kalai Manggai Uruvam Kandu	Viswanathan–Ramamoorthy	Seerkazhi Govindarajan
1965	Pinchuhridhayam	Malayalam	Gaanavum Layavum Neeyalle	V. Dakshinamoorthy	P. Leela
1965	Shakunthala	Malayalam	Kaamavardhiniyaam	K. Raghavan	P. Leela
1965	Shakunthala	Malayalam	Kaalil Chilanka	K. Raghavan	K. J. Yesudas
1965	Shakunthala	Malayalam	Guru Brahma	K. Raghavan	
1966	Rangula Ratnam	Telugu	Chepa Rupamuna	S. Rajeswara Rao and B. Gopalam	A. P. Komala
1967	Sri Purandara Dasaru	Kannada	Aadidano Ranga	C. N. Pandurangan	
