= Moondru Pengal =

- Poster
- Directed by: R. S. Prakash
- Screenplay by: P. X. Rangasami
- Starring: R. S. Manohar; T. S. Balaiah; Girija; M. N. Rajam
- Cinematography: Veerabahu
- Edited by: N. V. Javeri
- Music by: K. V. Mahadevan; Kunnakudi B. Venkatarama Iyer; G. Aswathama
- Production company: Jayasri Lakshmi Pictures
- Release date: 12 February 1956
- Country: India
- Language: Tamil

Moondru Pengal (transl. Three Women) is a 1956 Indian Tamil-language film directed by R. S. Prakash. The film stars R. S. Manohar and Girija. It was released on 12 February 1956.

== Cast ==
List adapted from the database of Film News Anandan

Male cast

- R. S. Manohar
- T. S. Balaiah
- S. A. Asokan
- T. S. Durairaj

Female cast

- Girija
- P. K. Saraswathi
- M. N. Rajam

== Production ==
The film was produced under the banner JayaSri Lakshmi Pictures and directed by R. S. Prakash. P. X. Rangasami wrote the screenplay and dialogues. Cinematography was done by Veerabahu while the editing was done by N. V. Javeri. Ammaiyappan was the art director while P. S. Gopalakrishnan was in charge of choreography. Still photography was done by R. N. Nagaraja Rao.

== Soundtrack ==
Music was composed by K. V. Mahadevan, G. Aswathama and K. Venkatrama Iyer .

Song	Singer/s	Lyricist	Length
"Aanukkum Pennukkum"	Jikki	Thanjai N. Ramaiah Dass	02:55
"Bhagavane Un Padaipile"	Sirkazhi Govindarajan & Jikki	Thanjai N. Ramaiah Dass	02:58
"Arul Puriginraal Annai"	T. V. Rathnam	Kambadasan	02:59
"Paathokonga Nallaa Paathkonga"	T. V. Rathnam & A. P. Komala	Udumalai Narayana Kavi	06:06
"Enadhu Ullame Poothu Kulungum"	R. Balasaraswathi		02:50
"Inba Vaazhvin Anbu Geetham"	T. A. Mothi & A. P. Komala		02:59
"Saalaiyile Rendu Maram"	A. G. Rathnamala		03:08
"Ullathile Pongivarum Unarchikku"	T. A. Mothi & Udutha Sarojini		02:34
"Vaanmugil Kanda Vanna"	T. A. Mothi & T. V. Rathnam		03:29
"Vanakkam Saar Vanakkam"	T. A. Mothi & P. Leela		03:02
