= G. Govindarajulu Naidu =

Indian film composer

G. Govindarajulu Naidu was an acclaimed music director in the 1940s and 50s in the South Indian film industry. Hailing from Tiruchirappalli, he was among the musicians who defined the way of music in South Indian film industry. He composed music for Tamil and Telugu movies. He has family living in Dubai, UAE.

== Early life ==
Govindarajulu Naidu came from a Telugu speaking family from Thiruchi. This is where M. K. Thyagaraja Bhagavathar (MKT) used to sing in their house and Naidu introduced MKT to his children. G. Govindarajulu is a harmonium player in special dramas, but was also known as the one who taught music for K. B. Sundarambal. He also sold musical instruments and gramophone in Thiruchi, but the business was not doing very well. In 1940, Naidu took his family to Madras to look for greener pasture there.

T. G. Lingappa was the second son of Naidu and had learned to play several musical instruments from him. His grandchildren live in Chennai & Bangalore.

== Career ==
Naidu but has left a lingering impact in his creations especially movies like Andhaman Kaidhi, Manidhanum Mirugamum, Maya Manithan, Baghdad Thirudan and Raja Bakthi.

He worked with singers like Thiruchi Loganathan, M. L. Vasanthakumari, C. S. Jayaraman, R. Balasaraswathi Devi, P. Leela, Jikki, T. V. Rathnam, A. P. Komala, N. L. Ganasaraswathi, A. M. Rajah, Ghantasala, T. M. Soundararajan, Seerkazhi Govindarajan, Radha Jayalakshmi, K. Jamuna Rani, P. Susheela.

The singing actors N. C. Vasanthakokilam, V. V. Sadagopan, K. Sarangapani, N. S. Krishnan, T. A. Madhuram, J. P. Chandrababu and P. Bhanumathi also sang memorable songs under his compositions.

== Works ==
Some compositions of G. Govindarajulu Naidu:

- kaaNi nilam vENdum from Andhaman Kaidhi by C. S. Jayaraman & M. L. Vasanthakumari
- vaazhvin jeevan kaadhalE from Andhaman Kaidhi by Ghantasala / P. Leela
- anju rooba nOttai from Andhaman Kaidhi by T. V. Rathnam
- paarmuzhuthum irul parappum from Raja Bakthi by R. Balasaraswathi Devi
- inba kuyil kuralinimai from Manidhanum Mirugamum by A. M. Rajah & M. L. Vasanthakumari
- imayamalai chaaralilE from Manidhanum Mirugamum by M. L. Vasanthakumari
- kaalamenum siRpi seiyyum from Manidhanum Mirugamum by C. S. Jayaraman
- manadhil urudhi vENdum from Kalvanin Kadhali by T. M. Soundararajan & P. Bhanumathi
- kanna kanna vaaraai from Maya Manidhan by Jikki
- sokkudhE manam suththudhE jagam from Baghdad Thirudan by P. Suseela
- "ennai konjam paaru" from Raja Bakthi by P. Suseela

== Filmography ==
Music direction in Tamil Movies.

Year	Film	Language	Director	Banner	Co-Music Directors
1937	Sathi Anasuya	Tamil			
1938	Sri Kandha Leela	Tamil	Arshadrai Mehta	Premier Cinetone	
1941	Venuganam	Tamil	Murugadasa (Muthuswami Iyer)	Jewel Pictures	
1946	Vijayalakshmi	Tamil	P. Pullaiah	Star Combines	
1949	Nam Naadu	Tamil	V. Shantaram	Rajkamal Kalamandir	
1950	Chandrika	Malayalam	V. S. Raghavan	Sree Krishna Productions	V. Dakshinamoorthy
1950	Chandrika	Tamil	V. S. Raghavan	Sree Krishna Productions	V. Dakshinamoorthy
1952	Andhaman Kaidhi	Tamil	V. Krishnan	Radhakrishna Films	
1953	Manidhanum Mirugamum	Tamil	K. Vembu & S. D. Sundharam	Revathi Productions	
1954	Vedan Kannappa	Tamil	H. L. N. Simha	AVM Productions & The Karnataka Films Ltd.	
1955	Methavigal	Tamil	K. Vembu	Revathi Productions	
1955	Kalvanin Kadhali	Tamil	V. S. Raghavan	Revathi Productions	Ghantasala
1955	Santha Sakku	Kannada	Krishnan–Panju	Sri Panduranga Productions	
1956	Santha Sakku	Tamil	Krishnan–Panju	Sri Panduranga Productions	
1958	Maya Manithan	Tamil	T. P. Sundharam	Southern Movies	
1959	Paththarai Maathu Thangam	Tamil	K. S. Mani	Manivel Pictures	Tiruvenkadu Selvarathinam
1960	Baghdad Thirudan	Tamil	T. R. Sundaram	Modern Theatres	
1960	Raja Bakthi	Tamil	K. Vembu	Nandhi Pictures	
