= Sri Kandha Leela =

Sri Kanda Leela
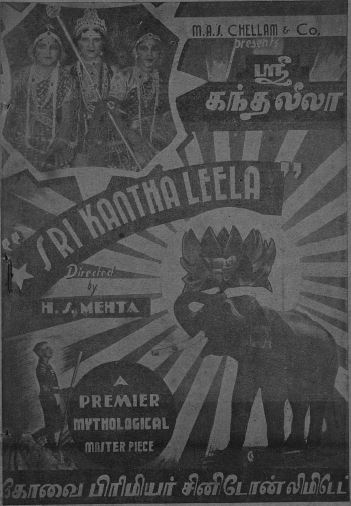
- Directed by: H. S. Mehta
- Written by: Nanjappa Chettiar
- Starring: Raja M. G. Dhandapani; M. V. Mani; Ramaiah Sastry; Vasantha; Sundarambal; Dhanalaksmi
- Cinematography: J. S. Patel
- Music by: G. Govindarajulu Naidu
- Production company: Premier Cinetone
- Release date: March 19, 1938
- Country: India
- Language: Tamil

Sri Kanda Leela is a 1938 Indian Tamil language film directed by H. S. Mehta.

== Cast ==
The following details were taken from the company song book.

Males
Name	Character
Raja M. G. Dhandapani	Sooran
M. V. Mani	Veeravagu
Master P. S. Mani (5 years)	Bala (child) Murugan
Master Murugesan (10 years)	Dhandapani
Master Narayanan	Subramanyar
Ramaiah Sastry	Idumban
Gnanamani	Narada
Selvamani	Sayanthan
V. V. S. Mani	Bhanugopan
T. R. Kuppusamy Pillai	Lord Shiva
G. Govindarajulu	Vishnu
Saudappa	Brahma
Arumugam	Indra

Females
Name	Character
Vasantha	Valli
Sundarambal	Deivayanai
Dhanalakshmi	Parvathi
Suseeladevi	Indrani
Seethalakshmi	Asamukhi

== Production ==
The film was produced by M. A. S. Sellam and Co., Kovai Premier Cinetone and directed by H. S. Mehta. L. Najappa Chettiar wrote the screenplay, dialogues and songs. Cinematography was done by J. S. Patel. Meenakshisundara Nattuvanar directed the choreography.

== Soundtrack ==
The music was composed by G. Govindarajulu while the lyrics were penned by L. Nanjappa Chettiar. Some folk devotional songs and one Thiruppugal were included in the film. Altogether there were 25 songs in the film. All the songs were sung by the actors featuring the respective characters.
