= Andhaman Kaidhi =

1952 film by V. Krishnan

- Theatrical release poster
- Directed by: V. Krishnan
- Written by: Ku. Sa. Krishnamurthy
- Based on: Andhaman Kaidhi by Ku. Sa. Krishnamurthy
- Starring: M. G. Ramachandran
- Cinematography: V. Krishnan
- Edited by: Manickam
- Music by: G. Govindarajulu Naidu
- Production company: Radhakrishna Films
- Release date: 14 March 1952
- Running time: 190 minutes
- Country: India
- Language: Tamil

Andhaman Kaidhi (transl. The Andhaman Convict) is a 1952 Indian Tamil-language crime drama film directed by V. Krishnan and written by Ku. Sa. Krishnamurthy. Starring M. G. Ramachandran, it is based on Krishnamurthy's play of the same name. The film was released on 14 March 1952.

== Plot ==
In the opening sequence, jailed former labour leader Nataraj is telling his cellmates about the suffering his family endured as a result of his uncle Ponnambalam betraying his fellow Indians in order to help the British. Nataraj tells of how Ponnambalam murdered his father, swindled his mother of her meager savings and forced her sister Leela into marriage. Nataraj hunts down and kills his uncle, which lands him in jail to tell his story.

Circa 1947. Ponnambalam helps himself to the properties and riches of his brother-in-law Chidambaram Pillai, who is settled in faraway Karachi. Ponnambalam is aided by his sidekick Jambu and the court clerk Muniyandi. When Chidambaram Pillai returns home and starts questioning Ponnambalam, he is killed.

In the aftermath of India Pakistan partition, Chidambaram Pillai's family manages to escape from the strife torn Karachi. His wife, son Natarajan, and daughter Leela reach their hometown, only to find Chidambaram Pillai dead. They are driven away by the heartless Ponnambalam. An honest youth Balu, who is moved by their plight and offers them shelter in his house and falls in love with Leela. Natarajan who took pity for Vallikannu, who had been a victim of Ponnambalam's lust, soon turns to love.

Jambu gets Natarajan arrested on trumped up charges, and succeeds in getting Leela married to Ponnambalam. Leela pretends to be haunted by a ghost, and manages to postpone consummating the coerced marriage. But Jambu sees through her pretenses and makes bold to molest her. Balu rushes to save Leela from her ordeal, but when he reaches her house, he finds Leela torn and bruised, and Ponnambalam is lying dead. Balu is charged with the murder and arrested.

== Cast ==
- M. G. Ramachandran as Nataraj
- Thikkurissy Sukumaran Nair as Balu
- K. Sarangapani as Ponnambalam
- S. D. Subbulakshmi as Kamatchi
- P. K. Saraswathi as Leela
- M. S. Draupadhi as Vallikannu
- T. S. Balaiah as Jambu
- T. N. Sivathanu as the cook in Ponnambalam's household

== Production ==
Andhaman Kaidhi was a play written by Ku. Sa. Krishnamurthy, first staged in 1938. When it was adapted into a film produced by Radhakrishna Films, Krishnamurthy was retained as screenwriter. The film was originally directed by K. Subramanyam who left, resulting in cinematographer V. Krishnan taking over direction. Newsreel footage of Indian Independence Day celebrations was added to the beginning of the film. M. G. Ramachandran was credited by his real name, rather than "Ramchandar" that was prevailing in many of his previous films in the late 1940s.

== Soundtrack ==
The music was composed by G. Govindarajulu Naidu. All the lyrics were by Ku. Sa. Krishnamurthy except the song "Kaani Nilam Vendum Paraasakthi", based on a song written by poet Subramania Bharati. The song "Anju Rooba Nottai Konjam Munne Maatthi", sung by T. V. Rathnam, revolves around the poor masses who suffer from economic disparity.

Song	Singers	Lyrics	Length
"Kaani Nilam Vendum Paraasakthi"	C. S. Jayaraman & M. L. Vasanthakumari	Subramania Bharati	02:34
"Vaazhvin Jeevan Kaadhale Valarum Anbin Nilaiyaale"	Ghantasala	Ku. Sa. Krishnamurthy	02:56
"Vaazhvin Jeevan Kaadhale Valarum Anbin Nilaiyaale" (pathos)	P. Leela	Ku. Sa. Krishnamurthy	02:21
"I Love You I Love You Aasaiyaanene Un Mele"	J. P. Chandrababu & A. G. Rathnamala	Ku. Sa. Krishnamurthy	03:00
"Anju Rooba Nottai Konjam Munne Maatthi"	T. V. Rathnam	Ku. Sa. Krishnamurthy	02:31
"Vanna Malar Thannai Kandu"	Ghantasala & P. Leela	Ku. Sa. Krishnamurthy	03:38
"Mayangaadhe Madhi Mayangaadhe"	T. V. Rathnam	Ku. Sa. Krishnamurthy	03:55
"Inbam Illaadha Illara Vaazhvil"	C. S. Jayaraman, dialogues by P. K. Saraswathi & K. Sarangapani	Ku. Sa. Krishnamurthy	01:48
"College Padippukku Goodbye Nam Kaadhal Vaazhvukkini Welcome"	T. V. Rathnam & A. P. Komala	Ku. Sa. Krishnamurthy	07:10
"Inbam Neruma En Vaazhvil Inbam Neruma"	T. V. Rathnam	Ku. Sa. Krishnamurthy	03:04
"Padipodu Nalla Panbumirundhal"	T. V. Rathnam	Ku. Sa. Krishnamurthy	
"Ennaasai Kannaatti Unnai"	T. V. Rathnam	Ku. Sa. Krishnamurthy	
"Aasai Kili Pol Pesum"	T. V. Rathnam & A. P. Komala	Ku. Sa. Krishnamurthy	
"Aiyaamaare Unga Kaiyaale"	T. V. Rathnam & A. P. Komala	Ku. Sa. Krishnamurthy	

== Release ==
Andhaman Kaidhi was released on 14 March 1952. According to historian Randor Guy, the film was not a major success but helped Ramachandran "move up the ladder of success".

== Bibliography ==
- Baskaran, S. Theodore (1996). The Eye of the Serpent: An Introduction to Tamil Cinema. Chennai: East West Books. OCLC 243920437.
- Rajadhyaksha, Ashish; Willemen, Paul (1998) [1994]. Encyclopaedia of Indian Cinema. British Film Institute and Oxford University Press. ISBN 0-19-563579-5.
