= Penn Manam =

- Film poster
- Directed by: S. Soundararajan
- Screenplay by: S. Soundararajan
- Story by: Thanjai N. Ramaiah Dass
- Produced by: S. Soundararajan
- Starring: T. K. Shanmugam; V. K. Ramasami; M. V. Rajamma; M. N. Rajam; S. A. Natarajan; C. T. Rajakantham
- Cinematography: M. R. Purushotham
- Music by: Kunnakudi Venkatarama Iyer
- Production company: Tamil Nadu Talkies
- Release date: 5 December 1952
- Running time: 15,959 ft.
- Country: India
- Language: Tamil

Penn Manam (transl. Female Mentality) is a 1952 Indian Tamil-language drama film directed and produced by S. Soundararajan. The film stars T. K. Shanmugam and M. V. Rajamma. It was released on 5 December 1952.

== Plot ==
Paramasivam, a farmer who lives with his wife Meenakshi and three children in Thanjavur, finds life difficult. Unable to face the difficulties, he goes to Colombo without informing his wife, and joins a drama troupe there. One of his children dies and Meenakshi is harassed by people. She tries to kill the other two children along with herself by jumping into a river with the children. However, they are saved by a sadhu. In Colombo, Paramasivam saves a child from being run over by a car. The car owner gives Paramasivam money in gratitude, and the latter returns to his village in India. Whether he succeeds in finding his family and whether all are able to live together forms the rest of the story.

== Cast ==
- T. K. Shanmugam as Paramasivam
- V. K. Ramasami
- S. A. Natarajan
- M. V. Rajamma as Meenakshi
- M. N. Rajam
- C. T. Rajakantham
- Menaka
- K. S. Angamuthu
- Muthulakshmi
- Pulimoottai Ramasami
- Kottapuli Jayaraman

== Production ==
Shooting took place at the now non-existent Shyamala Studios.

== Soundtrack ==
The music of the film was composed by Kunnakudi Venkatarama Iyer assisted by T. A. Kalyanam. Lyrics were written by Thanjai N. Ramaiah Dass.

Song	Singer/s	Duration (m:ss)
"Vetri Vetri Vetri"	T. A. Mothi, A. P. Komala & Madhavapeddi Satyam	03:06
"Aram Seiya Virumbu"	T. A. Mothi & A. P. Komala	03:04
"Nijame Nee Solvaai"	T. A. Mothi & A. V. Saraswathi	02:22
"Kanavilum Maraven"	M. L. Vasanthakumari	02:56
"Vandi Odumaa"	Thiruchi Loganathan	03:00
"Vaanatthil.... Sugamedhu Vaazhvile"	Madhavapeddi Satyam & M. L. Vasanthakumari	
"Vaazhvile Vaazhvile Aanandham"	Madhavapeddi Satyam & M. L. Vasanthakumari	02:43
"Paambin Vaai Therai Pol"	T. A. Mothi	
"Vidhikku Manithan Ulagile"	T. A. Mothi	
"Idhar Chinabazar Mele"	T. A. Mothi	
"Pattikaadu Suttha Pattikaadu"	T. A. Mothi & A. V. Saraswathi	
