= Maya Manithan =

- Title card
- Directed by: T. P. Sundaram; Harilal Badeviya
- Written by: A. S. Muthu
- Produced by: T. P. Sundaram
- Starring: Sriram; S. A. Ashokan; Chandrakantha; Vanaja; Maithili
- Cinematography: M. Krishnasamy
- Edited by: G. D. Joshi
- Music by: G. Govindarajulu Naidu
- Production company: Southern Movies
- Release date: 7 November 1958
- Country: India
- Language: Tamil

Maya Manithan (transl. Magical man) is a 1958 Indian Tamil language science fiction film produced and directed by T. P. Sundaram. The film stars Sriram, S. A. Ashokan, and Chandrakantha.

== Cast ==
- Sriram
- C. D. Vanaja
- S. A. Ashokan
- Maithili
- G. M. Basheer
- Chandrakantha
- Kaka Radhakrishnan
- T. P. Muthulakshmi
- K. Kannan
- Kandhala Devi
- Master Vijayakumar
- Pathangudi
- N. S. Subbaiah
- Samikannu
- Gajakarnam
- Rajamani
- Joseph
- Raja
- M. R. L. Narayan

Dance

- Helen (Kannukkulle Minnalaadudhu)
- Sukumari
- Bala
- Jeeva
- Malathi

== Soundtrack ==
Music was composed by G. Govindarajulu Naidu while the lyrics were penned by A. Maruthakasi.

Song	Singer/s	Duration (m:ss)
"Thanga Thalir Meni"	Jikki	03:04
"Kannaa Kannaa Vaaraai"	Jikki	03:10
"Kaana Venum Kaana Venum Endru"	S. Janaki	03:26
"Pasu Tholai.... Engi Engi Vaadudhe"	P. Susheela	03:21
"O! Radha, Ramana, Kanna"	S. Janaki	03:12
"Kannukkulle Minnalaadudhu"	Jikki	03:17
"Pokku Kaatti Poravale Ponnaammaa"	A. L. Raghavan & A. G. Rathnamala	02:54
"Paakku Vetthalai.... Iru Manasum Oru Manasaa"	S. V. Ponnusamy & T. V. Rathnam	03:32
"Achaa Pyaari Pombale"	S. C. Krishnan & S. Janaki	04:03
"Krishna Prabho.... Maayaa Leelaa Vinodhaa"	Jikki	01:39
