= Raja Bakthi =

- Theatrical release poster
- Directed by: K. Vembu
- Written by: Ku. Rajvelu (dialogues)
- Story by: V. C. Gopalarathnam
- Produced by: P. Rajamanickam Chettiar
- Starring: Sivaji Ganesan; Vyjayanthimala; P. Bhanumathi; T. S. Balaiah; Padmini; Pandari Bai; M. N. Nambiar
- Cinematography: R. Sampath
- Edited by: K. Shankar
- Music by: G. Govindarajulu Naidu
- Production company: Nandhi Productions
- Release date: 27 May 1960
- Running time: 150 minutes
- Country: India
- Language: Tamil

Raja Bakthi (transl. Loyalty to the crown) is a 1960 Indian Tamil-language historical drama film, written by V. C. Gopal Rathnam and directed by K. Vembu. The film stars Sivaji Ganesan, Vyjayanthimala and P. Bhanumathi, with T. S. Balaiah, Padmini, Pandari Bai, M. N. Nambiar, E. V. Saroja and Stunt Somu as the ensemble cast, and was produced by P. Rajamanickam Chettiar of Nandhi Pictures. The film's music was composed by G. Govindarajulu Naidu and was filmed by R. Sampath. The film, released on 27 May 1960, was a box office failure.

== Plot ==
The film is about an ambitious Queen who makes an unsuccessful attempt to rule her country by eliminating the King and Prince with the help of her Army Commander. General Vikranthan rescues the young prince and plans to retake the throne from the usurper and place the rightful heir on it.

== Cast ==
- Sivaji Ganesan as General Vikrangadhan
- Vyjayanthimala as Princess Mrinalini
- P. Bhanumathi as Empress Madharasai
- Padmini as Queen Sarojini
- Pandari Bai as Princess Devangana
- T. S. Balaiah as King Dhurjeyan
- M. N. Nambiar as General
- E. V. Saroja as Dancer
- Stunt Somu as Kanthappa, Prince's bodyguard

== Soundtrack ==
The music was composed by G. Govindarajulu Naidu.

Song	Singers	Lyrics	Length
"Annaiye Deva Devi"	T. S. Bhagavathi	Ponmudi	02:36
"Ennai Konjam Paaru"	P. Susheela	A. Maruthakasi	02:25
"Kadhal Tholvi"	P. Susheela	A. Maruthakasi	02:40
"Kadhal Vetri"	P. Susheela	A. Maruthakasi	02:34
"Vellaik Kudhiraiyile" "Vannam Paadum" "Sooraadhi Soorar"	Jikki & A. P. Komala; Radha Jayalakshmi; Thiruchi Loganathan	A. Maruthakasi	
"Karka Kasadara Katravai"	M. L. Vasanthakumari	Thamizh Azhagan	02:50
"Par Muzhudum Irul Parappum"	R. Balasaraswathi	Rajavelu	02:46
"Kaliyuga Malarmaran Thaano"	P. Leela & Radha Jayalakshmi		02:38
