= Punithavathi =

- Directed by: M. R. Vittal Rao
- Screenplay by: Sri Sathya Narayana
- Produced by: C. T. Chettiar
- Starring: R. S. Manohar; K. Sarangapani; Kaka Radhakrishnan; Pandari Bai
- Music by: Hussein K. H. Reddy
- Production company: Sathya Narayana Pictures
- Release date: 1963
- Country: India
- Language: Tamil

Punithavathi is a 1963 Indian Tamil language film directed by M. R. Vittal. The film stars R. S. Manohar and Pandari Bai.

== Cast ==
Male cast

- R. S. Manohar
- K. Sarangapani
- Kaka Radhakrishnan
- Vadhiraj
- Dhasarathan
- Raghavan
- Maali

Female cast

- Pandari Bai
- Kamatchi
- Bombay Meenakshi
- Chellam

== Production ==
The film was produced by C. T. Chettiar under the banner Sri Sathya Narayana Pictures and was directed by M. R. Vittal. Screenplay and dialogues were penned by Sri Sathya Narayana.

== Soundtrack ==
Music was composed by Hussein Reddy.

Song	Singer/s	Lyricist	Duration (m:ss)
"Thithikkum Kuralaale Thiruvalluvan"	P. Leela	Surabhi	03:07
"Appaavoda Chellamaa"	A. M. Rajah & Jikki	Surabhi	
"Chukku Chukku Rayil Vandi"	Kamala and group	Surabhi	
"Aann Onru Nalla Penn Onru"	Sirkazhi Govindarajan	Surabhi	
"Gundu Malli Valarndhirukku"	Sirkazhi Govindarajan & A. P. Komala	Surabhi	03:16
"Veettinile Vennilaa"	Ghantasala, P. Susheela	Suratha	03:24
"Ye Kutti Ye Kutti"	Hussein Reddy, Rajeswari	A. L. Narayanan	
"Azhagile Ulagame Adakkamaiyaa"	S. Janaki	Subbu Arumugam	
"Adi Ammaa Ponne"	T. V. Rathnam &		03:24
