= Paththarai Maathu Thangam =

- Poster
- Directed by: K. S. Mani
- Screenplay by: Kalaipithan
- Produced by: K. S. Mani
- Starring: N. N. Kannappa; Pandari Bai; T. S. Balaiah; T. R. Ramachandran; M. S. Sundari Bai
- Cinematography: Balakrishna
- Music by: G. Govindarajulu Naidu; Tiruvenkadu Selvarathinam
- Production company: Manivel Pictures
- Release date: 22 May 1959
- Running time: 138 minutes
- Country: India
- Language: Tamil

Paththarai Maathu Thangam (transl. Pure gold) is a 1959 Indian Tamil language film produced and directed by K. S. Mani. The film stars N. N. Kannappa, T. S. Balaiah and Pandari Bai. It was released on 22 May 1959.

== Cast ==
The following list was adapted from the database of Film News Anandan

Male cast

- N. N. Kannappa
- T. S. Balaiah
- T. R. Ramachandran
- M. R. Santhanam
- K. S. Rajam
- Gopal

Female cast

- Pandari Bai
- M. S. Sundari Bai
- Meenakshi
- Kanchana

== Production ==
The film was produced and directed by K. S. Mani under the banner Manivel Pictures and was released on 22 May 1959. Kalaipithan wrote the story and dialogues. Balakrishna was in charge of Cinematography.

== Soundtrack ==
The music was composed by G. Govindarajulu Naidu and Tiruvenkadu Selvarathinam while the lyrics were penned by Thamizh Azhagan, Subbu Arumugam, Ku. Sa. Krishnamoorthy, V. Lakshmana Das and Kavi Rajagopal.

Song	Singer/s	Lyricist	Length
"Aasai Thambi Kitte Vaa"	Shantha Nair	Thamizh Azhagan	03:04
"Sirithu Pesi Otrumaiyaai"	P. Leela, A. P. Komala	Thamizh Azhagan	02:39
"Kaathulla Pothe Thoothikanum"	T. M. Soundararajan	Subbu Arumugam	
"Aadhavanaam Deivam Tharum"	T. M. Soundararajan	Subbu Arumugam	
"Aniyaayam Adukkumaa"	M. S. Rajeswari	Ku. Sa. Krishnamoorthy	03:14
"Yezhai Ennaalume Yezhaiyaa"	S. Janaki	V. Lakshmana Das	
"Onnum Theriyaadha"	P. Susheela	Kavi Rajagopal	03:29
"Manasa Nallaa Theriyaame"	T. V. Rathnam	Kavi Rajagopal	
"Jaya Jaya Nama Paarvathi"	Dasarathan, Shanmugam, Rama Rao; Shanmugasundaram, Dhuruvan	Old Tamil song	
