= Sirkazhi Govindarajan =

Indian singer (1933–1988)

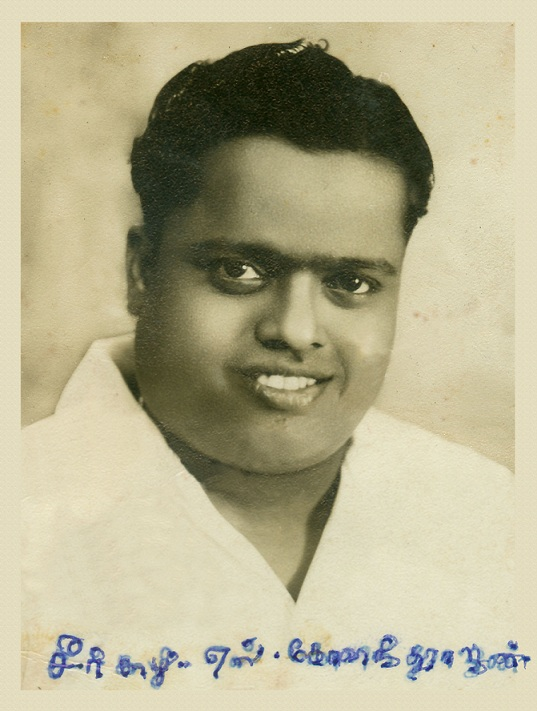

Background information
- Born: Sirkazhi Govindarajan; 19 January 1933; Sirkazhi, Madras Presidency, British India (now in Tamil Nadu, India)
- Died: 24 March 1988 (aged 55) Madras (now Chennai), Tamil Nadu, India
- Genres: Film music (playback singing), Indian classical music
- Occupations: Singer, actor
- Instrument: Vocalist
- Years active: 1952–1988

Sirkazhi Govindarajan (19 January 1933 – 24 March 1988) was a Carnatic vocalist and playback singer of Indian cinema, predominantly in Tamil cinema. He was conferred the Padma Shri award by the Government of India.

== Early life ==
Govindarajan was born on 19 January 1933 at Sirkazhi (a small town in present-day Mayiladuthurai district, Tamil Nadu; famed birthplace of Sambandar, one of the 63 Nayanars of the Saiva faith) to Siva Chidambaram and Avayambal Ammal. At the age of eight, Govindarajan began to perform at the Tirupurasundari Temple on the occasion of the Gnana Paal Festival.

== Musical education ==
He graduated from the Tamil Isai College in Chennai (Madras) in 1949 with the degree 'Isaimani'. He also graduated with the Degree of 'Sangeetha Vidwan'. At the same time, he started rigorous training (Gurukulavasam) under his Guru Thiruppampuram Swaminatha Pillai, who was then a professor at the Central College of Carnatic Music, Madras. Under his tutelage and in-depth study, he gained knowledge of the nuances and intricacies of Indian Music, especially, Classical Carnatic Music. During this period (1951–1952) he won many competitions, conducted by the Sangeetha Vidwat Sabha (Music Academy) and the Rasika Ranjani Sabha.

== Collaboration ==
=== Music composers ===
S. V. Venkataraman, S. M. Subbaiah Naidu, S. Rajeswara Rao, S. Dakshinamurthi, V. Dakshinamoorthy, G. Ramanathan, C. N. Pandurangam, Master Venu, K. V. Mahadevan, Kunnakudi Vaidyanathan, G. Devarajan, B. Narasimma Rao, A. Rama Rao, T. Chalapathi Rao, T. G. Lingappa, P. Adinarayana Rao, T. R. Pappa, Ghantasala, Vedha, G. K. Venkatesh, M. S. Viswanathan, T. K. Ramamoorthy, V. Kumar, A. M. Rajah, C. Ramachandra, Ilaiyaraaja, and Shankar–Ganesh, Baburaj

=== Playback singers ===
He has sung with other male singers such as M. S. Viswanathan, T. M. Soundararajan, Ghantasala, P. B. Sreenivas, S. C. Krishnan, Tiruchi Loganathan, A. L. Raghavan, K. J. Yesudas and S. V. Ponnusamy.

He also sang duets with many female singer such as M. L. Vasanthakumari, P. Leela, K. Jamuna Rani, Jikki, P. Susheela, K. Rani, L. R. Eswari, L. R. Anjali, Soolamangalam Rajalakshmi, Soolamangalam Jayalakshmi, R. Balasaraswathi Devi, N. L. Ganasaraswathi, A. P. Komala, A. G. Rathinmala, T. V. Rathnam, Bangalore A. R. Ramani Ammal, Vani Jairam, S. Janaki, M. R. Vijaya, Sarala and Rohini.

He sang duets with singing actors such as N. S. Krishnan, T. R. Mahalingam, P. Bhanumathi, S. Varalakshmi and Manorama.

== Filmography ==
Year	Movie	Role
1967	Kandhan Karunai	Nakkeerar
1969	Vaa Raja Vaa	Police Officer
1970	Thirumalai Thenkumari	Bhagavathar shivachidambaram
1972	Agathiyar	Agathiyar
1972	Dheivam	Cameo Appearance
1973	Rajaraja Cholan	Nambiyandar Nambi
1975	Thiruvarul	Cameo Appearance
1976	Dasavatharam	Naradhar
1982	Thaai Mookaambikai	Cameo Appearance

== Discography ==
Govindarajan had sung for many leading actors like M. G. Ramachandran, Gemini Ganesan, N. T. Rama Rao, S. S. Rajendran, and R. Muthuraman.

== Awards and honours ==
He was the recipient of three gold medals (first place) in the austere and hallowed halls of Sangeetha Vidwat Sabha (Music Academy) from Karaikudi Sambasiva Iyer. "Sangeetha Vidwan" Sirkali won all first places in the three categories: Apoorva Krithis of Sri Thyagaraja swamigal, Ragam-Thalam-Pallavi, and Tamil Classical Songs.

He was conferred the Padma Shri award by the Government of India. The Central College of Carnatic Music was the next institution for his musical enrichment.

Govindarajan had also done playback singing in Tamil, Telugu, Kannada and Malayalam films. Madras University conferred a doctorate (Honoris Causa) on him in 1983.

- ISAI MANI: 1949 – Degree from Tamil Isai College, Madras
- SANGEETHA VIDWAN: 1951 – Degree from Central College of Carnatic Music, Madras
- ISAI ARASU: 1968 – Kunrakudi Adheenam, Kunrakudi kumari'
- Best Male Playback Singer: 1971 – for songs of Thirumalai Thenkumari
- ISAI KADAL: 1972 – Bharathi Youth Association, Madras
- INNISAI ARASU: 1974 – Tamil Nadu Nalvazhi Nilayam, Madras
- DHARUMAPURA ADHEENA ISAI PULAVAR: 1974 – Adheena Vidwan of Dharumapura Adheenam appointed by Sri Guru Maha Sannidhaanam
- KALAI MAMANI: 1975 – Tamil Nadu Iyal Isai Nataka Manram (State Sangeetha Nataka Academy Award)
- INNISAI VENDHAN: 1976 – Kandan Arts Academy, Madras
- SANGEETHA BHASKARA: 1977 – Sri Shantananda Swami, Sri Bhuvaneswari Adhishtanam, Pudukkottai
- ISAI THILAKAM: 1977 – Sri Thyagaraja Sangeetha Sabha
- ISAI GNANA BHOOPATHI: 1978 – Brittania Hindu Shiva Temple Trust, London
- EZHISAI VENDHAR AND GANAMRITHA VARITHI: 1978 – During Sri Lanka tours
- PERISAIMANI: 1979 – Sangeetha Abhivrithi Sabha, Kuala Lumpur, Malaysia
- IRAI ISAI VENDHAI: 1979 – Seshasayee Paper Mill Temple, Erode
- MIYAN TANSEN AWARD: 1980 – Delhi Drupad Sangam, New Delhi
- Central Sangeet Natak Akademi Award: 1980
- Tamil Isai Mannar: 1981 – New York Tamil Sangam, New York
- Gandharva Geetha Vithakar: 1981 – Ramalingar Pani Manram, Paris, France
- Di Singenden Hersen Von Indien: 1981 – Yoga Center (Germans), Düsseldorf, West Germany
- Tamil Nadu Arasavai Kalaignar: 1981 – At the Bharathiyar Centenary Celebrations
- Isai Perarignar: 1982 – Annual music festival honor from Tamil Isai Sangam, Madras
- Padma Shri: 1983
- ISAI THENDRAL: 1984 – Thyagaraja Swami Aradhana Committee, Tirutani
- INNISAIMANI: 1985 – Guru Gnana Sambandar Iraipani Manram
- GAMBEERA GANA ISAI VENDHAN: 1985 – Arya Vaisya Schools, Madurai
- ARUL ISAI ARIGNAR: 1987 – Mauritius Education and Cultural Tour
- TAMIL ISAIPERARIGNAR: 1987 – Tamil Sangam, Bangalore
- MUTHAMIZH KALAI MAMANI: 1987 – Tamil Sangam, Salem
- ISAIMAMANNAR: 1987 – Bharathidasan Centenary celebrations by Dravidar Kazhagam, Madras
- ISAIPERARUVI: 1987 – Siddhi Vinayakar Temple, Paris, France
- CULTURAL AMBASSADOR: 1987 – Frei Platz Axion-World Peace Conference in Switzerland

== Personal life ==
Govindarajan was married to Sulochana from Omalur, Tamil Nadu. Their son Sirkazhi G. Sivachidambaram is also a Carnatic singer and a Medical Doctor.

== Death ==
Govindarajan died on 24 March 1988 in Madras (now Chennai) due to a massive heart attack. He was aged 55.
