= Sirkazhi Govindarajan discography =

Indian singer discography

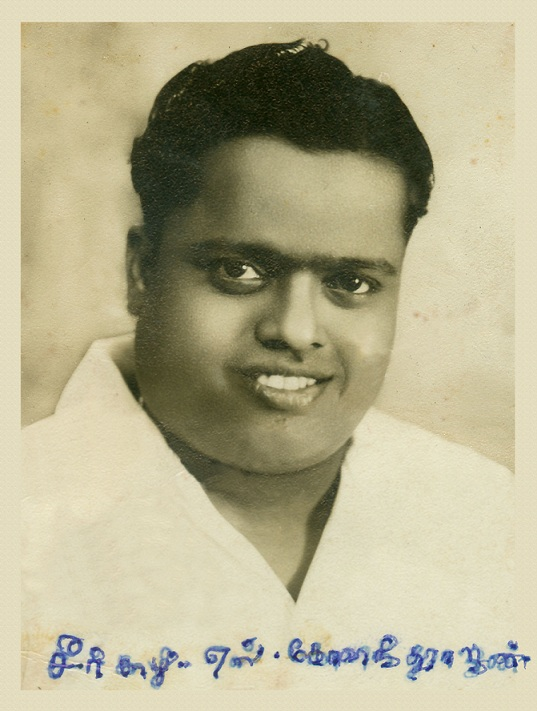

This is the discography of Indian male playback singer Sirkazhi Govindarajan, who sang in over 900 songs in Tamil films. He mostly sang in Tamil Film Songs and Devotional Songs. He gave his voice to actors and thespians in the Tamil film industry such as M. G. Ramachandran, Gemini Ganesan, S. S. Rajendran, R. Muthuraman, K. A. Thangavelu, V. Nagayya, Prem Nazir, Kalyan Kumar, Nagesh In addition to various other known and unknown heroes and supporting actors like R. S. Manohar, S. V. Subbaiah, Kannadasan, Kuladeivam Rajagopal, Major Sundarrajan, Thengai Srinivasan, Suruli Rajan, Master Prabhakar.

== Collaboration ==
=== Music composers ===
A. M. Rajah, S. V. Venkataraman, S. M. Subbaiah Naidu, S. Rajeswara Rao, S. Dakshinamurthi, V. Dakshinamoorthy, G. Ramanathan, C. N. Pandurangan, Master Venu, M. S. Viswanathan, T. K. Ramamoorthy, K. V. Mahadevan, Kunnakudi Vaidyanathan, Ghantasala, B. Narasimma Rao, A. Rama Rao, T. Chalapathi Rao, T. G. Lingappa, P. Adinarayana Rao, T. R. Pappa, Vedha, G. K. Venkatesh, V. Kumar, C. Ramachandra, Ilaiyaraaja and Shankar–Ganesh.

=== Playback singers ===
He has sung with other male singers such as Thiruchi Loganathan, M. S. Viswanathan, T. M. Soundararajan, P. B. Sreenivas, Ghantasala, S. C. Krishnan, A. L. Raghavan, S. V. Ponnusamy and K. J. Yesudas.

He has sung duets with many female singers such as M. L. Vasanthakumari, P. Leela, Jikki, K. Jamuna Rani, K. Rani, P. Susheela, L. R. Eswari, L. R. Anjali, M. S. Rajeswari, Soolamagalam Rajalaskhmi, Soolamangalam Jayalaskhmi, R. Balasaraswathi, N. L. Ganasaraswathi, A. P. Komala, A. G. Rathnamala, T. V. Rathnam, Bangalore A. R. Ramani Ammal, Vani Jayaram, S. Janaki, M. R. Vijaya, Sarala and Rohini.

He sang duets with singing actors such as N. S. Krishnan, T. R. Mahalingam, S. Varalakshmi, P. Bhanumathi and Manorama.

== Awards ==
=== Honorary and major awards ===
- Honorary Doctorate (Honoris Causa) by Madras University, Tamil Nadu in 1983.
- Padmashri award by Government of India

=== Tamil Nadu State Film Awards ===
Year	Film	Category	Outcome	Ref
1970	Thirumalai Thenkumari	Best Male Playback	Won	

== List of films discography ==
=== 1950s ===
Song	Movie	Year	Music	Lyrics	Co - Singer
Siripputhaan Varuguthaiyaa	Ponvayal	1954	Thuraiyur Rajagopal Sarma & R. Rajagopal		
Maadugalaa Kaalai Maadugalaa	Ponvayal	1954	Thuraiyur Rajagopal Sarma & R. Rajagopal		N. L. Ganasaraswathi
Parugidara Jorugaa	Bangaru Bhoomi	1954	Thuraiyur Rajagopal Sarma & R. Rajagopal	Malladi Ramakrishna Sastry	
Bava Mana Pelli	Bangaru Bhoomi	1954	Thuraiyur Rajagopal Sarma & R. Rajagopal	Malladi Ramakrishna Sastry	N. L. Ganasaraswathi
	Ammaiyappan	1954	T. R. Pappa		
Vaanameedhil Neendhi Odum Vennilave	Gomathiyin Kaadhalan	1955	G. Ramanathan	Ku. Ma. Balasubramaniam	
Anbe En Aaruyire Vaaraai	Gomathiyin Kaadhalan	1955	G. Ramanathan	Ku. Ma. Balasubramaniam	Jikki
Thelli Tharum Tinai Maa	Gomathiyin Kaadhalan	1955	G. Ramanathan	Ku. Mu. Annal Thango	
Minnuvadhellam Ponnendru Enni	Gomathiyin Kaadhalan	1955	G. Ramanathan	K. D. Santhanam	Jikki
Kongunaattu Sengarumbe	Gomathiyin Kaadhalan	1955	G. Ramanathan	K. D. Santhanam	
Aandavan Kattalaiyai.... Indha Ulagame Naadaga Medaiyadaa	Guna Sundari	1955	Ghantasala	Thanjai N. Ramaiah Dass	Ghantasala & S. C. Krishnan
Adhuve Edhiril Varuvadharkkulle	Guna Sundari	1955	Ghantasala	Thanjai N. Ramaiah Dass	S. C. Krishnan
Sadhaaram Naadagam	Kalvanin Kadhali	1955	G. Govindarajulu Naidu & Ghantasala		Thiruchi Loganathan & Shanmugasundharam
Mandhiram Yaavum Onre	Kalyanam Seydhukko	1955	Ramaneekaran	Kalyan	
Aasai Venum Kaasu Panam Theda	Kalyanam Seydhukko	1955	Ramaneekaran	Kalyan	Paramasivam
Raajaa En Aasai Machaan	Kalyanam Seydhukko	1955	Ramaneekaran	Kalyan	A. P. Komala
Vaazhvin Oliye Varuvaai	Kalyanam Seydhukko	1955	Ramaneekaran	Kalyan	Jikki
Engum Nirai Paramporul Onre	Kalyanam Seydhukko	1955	Ramaneekaran	Ka. Mu. Sheriff	
Vaetti Kattina Pombala	Kalyanam Seydhukko	1955	Ramaneekaran	Ka. Mu. Sheriff	Soolamangalam Jayalakshmi
Azhagin Dheivam Arivin Sigaram	Menaka	1955	C. N. Pandurangan & Vedha		K. R. Ramasamy
ABCD Pdikkiren	Nalla Thangai	1955	G. Ramanathan	A. Maruthakasi	Thiruchi Loganathan
Kanne Karumaniye	Nallathangal	1955	G. Ramanathan		P. Leela
Thiru Ullam Irangaadha	Nallathangal	1955	G. Ramanathan	A. Maruthakasi	
Shambho Mahaadeva	Shivasharane Nambekka	1955	T. G. Lingappa		
Lady Lady Lady Lady Aasai Lady	Town Bus	1955	K. V. Mahadevan	Ka. Mu. Sheriff	S. C. Krishnan & U. R. Chandra
Nadanam Aadinaar	Valliyin Selvan	1955	Parur S. Anantharaman	Kothamangalam Subbu	
Nallavan Endre	Valliyin Selvan	1955	Parur S. Anantharaman	Kothamangalam Subbu	
Nadodi Kottam Nanga Thilelelo	Amara Deepam	1956	T. Chalapathi Rao & G. Ramanathan	Udumalai Narayana Kavi	T. M. Soundararajan, A. P. Komala & T. V. Rathnam
Edhu Nijam	Edhu Nijam	1956	Master Venu	Ku. Ma. Balasubramaniam	
Naadagamellam Aadalam	Illarame Inbam	1956	Ghantasala		K. Rani
Prema Prema Prema	Illarame Inbam	1956	Ghantasala		K. Rani
Thiruve En Dhevi Nee Vaaraai	Kokilavani	1956	G. Ramanathan	A. Maruthakasi	Jikki
Azhagodaiyil Neendhum Ila Annam	Kokilavani	1956	G. Ramanathan	S. D. Sundharam	Jikki
Sarasa Mohana Sangeedhaamrudha	Kokilavani	1956	G. Ramanathan	S. D. Sundharam	
Anboli Veesi	Kokilavani	1956	G. Ramanathan	S. D. Sundharam	
Maalaiyile Manasaanthi	Kokilavani	1956	G. Ramanathan	A. Maruthakasi	
Abalaiyin Gathi Idhuvo	Kudumba Vilakku	1956	T. R. Pappa	Subbu Arumugam	
Adiyaargal Ullatthile (Paathar Vellai Kootthu)	Kula Dheivam	1956	R. Sudarsanam		T. M. Soundararajan & M. M. Muthu
Kannin Oli Paavai Pole	Mandhiravathi	1956	Br Lakshmanan		P. Leela
Vinnil Vaazhum Dhevano	Mandhiravathi	1956	Br Lakshmanan	Nagai Mani	Jikki
Maha Sakthi Thaaye	Mandhiravathi	1956	Br Lakshmanan		
Aadu Paambe	Mandhiravathi	1956	Br Lakshmanan		
Bagavaane Un Padaippile	Moondru Pengal	1956	K. V. Mahadevan	Thanjai N. Ramaiah Dass	Jikki
Hailesa Hailesa Hailesa	Ondre Kulam	1956	S. V. Venkatraman & M. V. Ranga Rao	Ku. Sa. Krishnamurthy	Jikki, Vasantha & Sundaramma
Kanni Thamizhhnadu	Pennin Perumai	1956	B. Narasimma Rao & A. Rama Rao	Thanjai N. Ramaiah Dass	
Uththamane Ulagil Nilaippadhu	Pennin Perumai	1956	B. Narasimma Rao & A. Rama Rao	Thanjai N. Ramaiah Dass	
Gumthala Gummaa Gumaaikkaadhe	Prema Pasam	1956	S. Rajeswara Rao	Thanjai N. Ramaiah Dass	Jikki
Kaanadha Inbamellaam Kandidalaam	Raja Rani	1956	T. R. Pappa	Villipuththan	T. V. Rathnam
Samarasam Ulaavum Idame	Rambaiyin Kaadhal	1956	T. R. Pappa	A. Maruthakasi	
Baagavane Mounam Eno	Rambaiyin Kaadhal	1956	T. R. Pappa	A. Maruthakasi	
Bakthar Pottrum Badharchchalane	Rambaiyin Kaadhal	1956	T. R. Pappa	Thanjai N. Ramaiah Dass	
Naatukkoru Veeran	Rangoon Radha	1956	T. R. Pappa	Pattukkottai Kalyanasundaram	A. G. Rathnamala
Laaba Nashtamadaa Naina	Sadhaaram	1956	G. Ramanathan	A. Maruthakasi	V. K. Ramasamy
	Verum Pechu Alla	1956	C. N. Pandurangan		
Thirumbi Paaru Thambi	Aaravalli	1957	G. Ramanathan	Villiputhan	Thiruchi Loganathan
Sengamma Ithu Angamma	Aaravalli	1957	G. Ramanathan	Villiputhan	Thiruchi Loganathan & A. G. Rathnamala
Kumaalam Pottathellam	Aaravalli	1957	G. Ramanathan	A. Maruthakasi	Thiruchi Loganathan
Manjal Poosi Varum	Aaravalli	1957	G. Ramanathan	A. Maruthakasi	Thiruchi Loganathan
Aadivarum Thendralada	Aaravalli	1957	G. Ramanathan		
Pazhakkamillatha Kazhudhaikkitta	Aaravalli	1957	G. Ramanathan	Pattukkottai Kalyanasundaram	Thiruchi Loganathan
Velga Nin Kotram Manna	Ambikapathy	1957	G. Ramanathan		
Aavi Udaigalai Naan Katti Vitten	Ambikapathy	1957	G. Ramanathan		
Ponaa Iyyanna Ikkanna Kaavanna Loona Kuthiraiyina	Ambikapathy	1957	G. Ramanathan		V. T. Rajagopalan
Atthaanai Engeyum Parrtheengalaa	Anbe Deivam	1957	H. R. Pathmanabha Sastry & Vijaya Bhaskar	Sundarakannan	P. Leela
Kaadhalenum Solaiyile	Chakravarthi Thirumagal	1957	G. Ramanathan	Ku. Ma. Balasubramaniam	
Aada Vanga Annaththaa	Chakravarthi Thirumagal	1957	G. Ramanathan	Ku. Ma. Balasubramaniam	Jikki & P. Leela
Ellai Illadha Inbathile	Chakravarthi Thirumagal	1957	G. Ramanathan	Ku. Ma. Balasubramaniam	P. Leela
Manidhan Porakkum Podhu	Chakravarthi Thirumagal	1957	G. Ramanathan	Pattukottai Kalyanasundaram	
Seermevum Gurupaadham	Chakravarthi Thirumagal	1957	G. Ramanathan	Clown Sundaram	N. S. Krishnan
Dhilli Thulukkar Seidha	Chakravarthi Thirumagal	1957	G. Ramanathan		
Anbe Aandavan Agum	Karpukkarasi	1957	G. Ramanathan	Pattukottai Kalyanasundaram	
Thaththakka Puththakka Naalu Kalu	Karpukkarasi	1957	G. Ramanathan	Kannadasan	P. Leela
Kaayame Idhu Meiyadaa	Karpukkarasi	1957	G. Ramanathan	Pattukottai Kalyanasundaram	T. M. Soundararajan
Marundho Marundhu.. Naattu Vaithiyar	Karpukkarasi	1957	G. Ramanathan	Pattukottai Kalyanasundaram	T. M. Soundararajan
Naan Thaan Un Kaadhalan	Manamagan Thevai	1957	G. Ramanathan	A. Maruthakasi	P. Bhanumathi
Dhayai Seiveere Dhayai Seiveere	Maya Bajaar	1957	Ghantasala & S. Rajeswara Rao	Thanjai N. Ramaiah Dass	S. C. Krishnan, G. Kasthoori & K. Rani
Baale Baale Dhevaa	Maya Bajaar	1957	Ghantasala & S. Rajeswara Rao	Thanjai N. Ramaiah Dass	
Kaalamadi Kaalam	Mudhalali	1957	K. V. Mahadevan	Ka. Mu. Sheriff	
Oho Rani, Oho Raja	Pakka Thirudan	1957	T. M. Ibrahim	Kuyilan	P. Leela
Penne Vaa Chinna Raani	Pakka Thirudan	1957	T. M. Ibrahim	Kuyilan	P. Leela
Aasaiye Maarumaa	Pakka Thirudan	1957	T. M. Ibrahim	Kuyilan	P. Leela
Vaaraai Neeye Vaa Potri Vaa	Pattaliyin Sabatham	1957	O. P. Nayyar	Kannadasan	
Thaainaadu Idhe Veeram Migundhorkke	Pattaliyin Sabatham	1957	O. P. Nayyar	Kannadasan	T. M. Soundararajan
Maaraadha Soozhchi	Pudhumai Pithan	1957	G. Ramanathan	Thanjai N. Ramaiah Dass	
Sigge Sthreelakoka Bhooshaname	Rajaputhri Rahasyamu	1957	G. Ramanathan	Sri Sri	
Aadvayya Annaji	Rajaputhri Rahasyamu	1957	G. Ramanathan	Sri Sri	Jikki & P. Ramam
Theeyani Raga Sampadhale	Rajaputhri Rahasyamu	1957	G. Ramanathan	Sri Sri	P. Leela
Kanumoosi Paal Kuduchi	Rajaputhri Rahasyamu	1957	G. Ramanathan	Sri Sri	
Srimaha Gurupadham Chintalanu	Rajaputhri Rahasyamu	1957	G. Ramanathan	Sri Sri	Pithapuram Nageswara Rao
Shanthagana Vahini Ve	Rajaputhri Rahasyamu	1957	G. Ramanathan	Sri Sri	
Idhayam Thannaiye	Raja Rajan	1957	K. V. Mahadevan	A. Maruthakasi	A. P. Komala
Nilavodu Vaanmugil	Raja Rajan	1957	K. V. Mahadevan	Ku. Sa. Krishnamurthy	A. P. Komala
Natvaangam	Rani Lalithangi	1957	G. Ramanathan	Thanjai N. Ramaiah Dass	
Panju Mel Adi Endru	Sathiyavan Savithri	1957	S. Rajeswara Rao & Babu Rao	Kuyilan	
Panju Mel Adi Endru	Sathiyavan Savithri	1957	S. Rajeswara Rao & Babu Rao	Kuyilan	
Panju Mel Adi Endru	Sathiyavan Savithri	1957	S. Rajeswara Rao & Babu Rao	Kuyilan	
Panju Mel Adi Endru	Sathiyavan Savithri	1957	S. Rajeswara Rao & Babu Rao	Kuyilan	
Panju Mel Adi Endru	Sathiyavan Savithri	1957	S. Rajeswara Rao & Babu Rao	Kuyilan	
Panju Mel Adi Endru	Sathiyavan Savithri	1957	S. Rajeswara Rao & Babu Rao	Kuyilan	
Panju Mel Adi Endru	Sathiyavan Savithri	1957	S. Rajeswara Rao & Babu Rao	Kuyilan	
Ven Thamarai Raaniye	Soubhagyavathi	1957	Pendyala Nageswara Rao & M. S. Gnanamani	A. L. Narayanan	P. Leela
Malaiye Un Nilaiye	Vanangamudi	1957	G. Ramanathan	Thanjai N. Ramaiah Das	
Aatchiyin	Vanangamudi	1957	G. Ramanathan	Thanjai N. Ramaiah Dass	
Kanirasame En Kanirasame Adhirasame	Yaar Paiyyan	1957	S. Dakshinamurthi	A. Maruthakasi	Jikki
Ezhaikku Ettaadha Ulagam	Aalai Kandu Mayangadhe	1958	S. M. Subbaiah Naidu		
Arasu Andru Kollum	Aalai Kandu Mayangadhe	1958	S. M. Subbaiah Naidu		
Enna Saami Ennai Appadi Paarkkire	Annaiyin Aanai	1958	S. M. Subbaiah Naidu	A. Maruthakasi	S. C. Krishnan & A. G. Rathnamala
Ella Vilakkum Vilakkalla	Athisaya Thirudan	1958	S. Dakshinamurthi & K. Prasad Rao	Thanjai N. Ramaiah Dass	
Vaanmadhi Nee Arivaai	Avan Amaran	1958	T. M. Ibrahim	Ku. Ma. Balasubramaniam	Jikki
Kaalanaa Minjaadhaiyaa	Avan Amaran	1958	T. M. Ibrahim	A. Maruthakasi	A. P. Komala
Aasai Vachchen	Bommai Kalyanam	1958	K. V. Mahadevan	Udumalai Narayana Kavi	T. V. Rathnam
Aalaipaaru Solaikolla Bommai Maari	Boologa Rambai	1958	C. N. Pandurangan	Puratchidasan	S. V. Ponnusamy & K. Rani
Kodagu Malai Koottamunga	Boologa Rambai	1958	C. N. Pandurangan	Puratchidasan	S. V. Ponnusamy & K. Rani
Paarkadal Thanile Palli Konde Endrum	Chenchu Lakshmi	1958	S. Rajeswara Rao		
Vidha Vidhamaagave Vedanggal Aniyum	Chenchu Lakshmi	1958	S. Rajeswara Rao		
Kadan Vaangi Kalyaana Saadham	Kadan Vaangi Kalyaanam	1958	S. Rajeswara Rao	Thanjai N. Ramaiah Dass	
Sundaraangiyai Paartthadhinaale Sila Per	Kadan Vaangi Kalyaanam	1958	S. Rajeswara Rao	Thanjai N. Ramaiah Dass	A. M. Rajah & P. Leela
Thennaadu Mudhal Enaadu Varai	Kadan Vaangi Kalyaanam	1958	S. Rajeswara Rao	Thanjai N. Ramaiah Dass	
Than Manadhai Nalanukku	Kadan Vaangi Kalyaanam	1958	S. Rajeswara Rao	Thanjai N. Ramaiah Dass	A. M. Rajah & P. Leela
Manmadhanai Sivaperuman	Kanniyin Sabatham	1958	T. G. Lingappa	Kannadasan	A. G. Rathnamala
Naan Porandha Seemaiyile	Kudumba Gouravam	1958	Viswanathan–Ramamoorthy	A. Maruthakasi	
Akkarai Cheemaikku Pona Macchaan	Maalaiyitta Mangai	1958	Viswanathan–Ramamoorthy	Kannadasan	K. Rani
Vil Enge Kanai Enge	Maalaiyitta Mangai	1958	Viswanathan–Ramamoorthy	Kannadasan	
Theynozhugu Senthamizh	Manamalai	1958	Vedha	Saravanabavanandhar	
Inbam Engey	Manamulla Maruthaaram	1958	K. V. Mahadevan	A. Maruthakasi	
Aadaadha Aatamellam Aaduranga Paaduraanga	Manamulla Maruthaaram	1958	K. V. Mahadevan	A. Maruthakasi	Jikki
Anusuya Kadhaakaalatchebam	Mangalya Bhagyam	1958	G. Ramanathan	Thanjai N. Ramaiah Dass	M. L. Vasanthakumari, K. Jamuna Rani, A. P. Komala & A. G. Rathnamala
Ondre Maandhar Kulam	Mangalya Bhagyam	1958	G. Ramanathan	Udumalai Narayana Kavi	K. Jamuna Rani & A. G. Rathnamala
Enaanga Ungalai	Mangalya Bhagyam	1958	G. Ramanathan	Udumalai Narayana Kavi	P. Leela
Kannodu Kann Kalandhaal	Mangalya Bhagyam	1958	G. Ramanathan	Thanjai N. Ramaiah Dass	P. Susheela
Uzhaippathillaa Uzhaippai	Nadodi Mannan	1958	S. M. Subbaiah Naidu	Kavi Lakshmanadas	
Soalaikkulle Kuyilu Kunji	Paanai Pidithaval Bhaagyasaali	1958	S. V. Venkatraman & S. Rajeswara Rao		P. Susheela
Poottukku Ettha Saavi Naan	Periya Koyil	1958	K. V. Mahadevan	A. Maruthakasi	
Valai Veesammaa Valai Veesu	Periya Koyil	1958	K. V. Mahadevan	A. Maruthakasi	P. Susheela
Kollai Kollum Muraiyinile	Periya Koyil	1958	K. V. Mahadevan		P. Susheela
Kaasu Panam Selavalittu	Periya Koyil	1958	K. V. Mahadevan	A. Maruthakasi	
Podadhaa Marathile... Onne Onnu	Petra Maganai Vitra Annai	1958	Viswanathan–Ramamoorthy	Thanjai N. Ramaiah Dass	Tiruchi Loganathan & Jikki
Pachaiyilum Neeyum Pachcha	Petra Maganai Vitra Annai	1958	Viswanathan–Ramamoorthy	Thanjai N. Ramaiah Dass	Jikki
Pillai Kani Amudhu Onnu	Pillai Kaniyamudhu	1958	K. V. Mahadevan	A. Maruthakasi	P. Susheela
Pillai Kani Amudhu Onnu (pathos)	Pillai Kaniyamudhu	1958	K. V. Mahadevan	A. Maruthakasi	
Odugira Thanniyile	Pillai Kaniyamudhu	1958	K. V. Mahadevan	A. Maruthakasi	P. Susheela
Seevi Mudichukiddu Singaaram	Pillai Kaniyamudhu	1958	K. V. Mahadevan	Pattukkottai Kalyanasundaram	
Alangara Valliye	Sabaash Meena	1958	T. G. Lingappa	Ku. Ma. Balasubramaniam	T. M. Soundararajan
Needhi Thavarathu	Sampoorna Ramayanam	1958	K. V. Mahadevan	A. Maruthaksi	
Paadhugaiye Thunaiyagum	Sampoorna Ramayanam	1958	K. V. Mahadevan	A. Maruthakasi	T. M. Soundararajan
Sabarikku Ramanum	Sampoorna Ramayanam	1958	K. V. Mahadevan	A. Maruthakasi	
Sree Raamachandra Magudaabishegam	Sampoorna Ramayanam	1958	K. V. Mahadevan	A. Maruthakasi	S. C. Krishnan
Araneri Marandha Thamayanai	Sampoorna Ramayanam	1958	K. V. Mahadevan	A. Maruthakasi	
Azhagiya Ilanga Nagarai	Sampoorna Ramayanam	1958	K. V. Mahadevan	A. Maruthakasi	
Atthiri Munivar Raman Lakshmananai	Sampoorna Ramayanam	1958	K. V. Mahadevan	A. Maruthakasi	
Mathiyilla Moorkkorukkor	Sarangadhara	1958	G. Ramanathan	A. Maruthakasi	
Vaazhga Namadhu Naadu	Sarangadhara	1958	G. Ramanathan	A. Maruthakasi	
Sollattumaa Sollattumaa	Thai Pirandhal Vazhi Pirakkum	1958	K. V. Mahadevan	A. Maruthakasi	K. Jamuna Rani
Amudhum Theanum Edharkku	Thai Pirandhal Vazhi Pirakkum	1958	K. V. Mahadevan	Suratha	
Poovaadai Nee Enakku	Thedi Vandha Selvam	1958	T. G. Lingappa	Thanjai N. Ramaiah Dass	T. V. Rathnam
Thulli Varap Poren	Thirumanam	1958	S. M. Subbaiah Naidu & T. G. Lingappa	Pattukkottai Kalyanasundaram	P. Susheela
Lavaa Lavaa ... Vai Raja Vai	Thirumanam	1958	S. M. Subbaiah Naidu & T. G. Lingappa	Thanjai N. Ramaiah Dass	A. G. Rathnamala
Vaa, Oru Saedhi Sollave Odi Vaa	Thirumanam	1958	S. M. Subbaiah Naidu & T. G. Lingappa	Thanjai N. Ramaiah Dass	P. Leela
Pulli Vaikkiraan	Uthama Puthiran	1958	G. Ramanathan	Ku. Ma. Balasubramaniam	P. Leela
Moolai Neranjavanga	Uthama Puthiran	1958	G. Ramanathan	Pattukkottai Kalyanasundaram	T. M. Soundararajan
Vetrivel	Vanjikottai Valiban	1958	C. Ramachandra	Kothamangalam Subbu	Thiruchi Loganathan & T. V. Rathnam
Vaikkal Vandi Baaram	Vanjikottai Valiban	1958	C. Ramachandra	Kothamangalam Subbu	Thiruchi Loganathan & P. Susheela
Ammaa Appaa Yenru	Alli Petra Pillai	1959	K. V. Mahadevan	A. Maruthakasi	
Onnum Onnum Serndhaaka	Alli Petra Pillai	1959	K. V. Mahadevan	A. Maruthakasi	Jikki
Nalla Naalu Romba Nalla Naalu	Alli Petra Pillai	1959	K. V. Mahadevan	A. Maruthakasi	T. M. Soundararajan & Thiruchi Loganathan
Singaara Vadivamaana Thithikkum	Amudhavalli	1959	Viswanathan–Ramamoorthy	Udumalai Narayana Kavi	P. Leela
Inai Solla Mudiyaadha Ezhiloviyam	Arumai Magal Abirami	1959	V. Dakshinamoorthy	Ku. Sa. Krishnamurthy	
Anipillai Tennampillai	Athisaya Penn	1959	S. M. Subbaiah Naidu	V. Seetharaman	
	Bala Nagamma	1959	Pamarthi		
Otrumaiyaai Vaazhvadhaale Undu	Bhaaga Pirivinai	1959	Viswanathan–Ramamoorthy	A. Maruthakasi	L. R. Eswari
Oh...Vandu Aadaadha Solaiyil	Engal Kuladevi	1959	K. V. Mahadevan	A. Maruthakasi	P. Susheela
Pattanamthaan Pogalaamadi	Engal Veettu Mahalakshmi	1959	Master Venu	Udumalai Narayana Kavi	P. Susheela
Dharmaseela Kalaivaanarukkulle	Kalaivaanan	1959	Pendyala Nageswara Rao	A. Maruthakasi	
En Kannil Ambu Undu	Kalaivaanan	1959	Pendyala Nageswara Rao	A. Maruthakasi	P. Susheela
Tea Tea Tea	Kalyana Parisu	1959	A. M. Rajah	Pattukkottai Kalyanasundaram	
Mannaadhi Mannarellaam	Kalyanikku Kalyanam	1959	G. Ramanathan	Thanjai N. Ramaiah Dass	V. R. Rajagopalan
Oho Oru Kuraiyum Seiyame.... Irukkum Pozhudhai Rasikkanum	Kan Thiranthathu	1959	V. T. Rajagopalan	Pattukkottai Kalyanasundaram	S. C. Krishnan & K. Jamuna Rani
Kann Thirandhadhu.... Pudhu Vazhvu Pervuvomada	Kan Thiranthathu	1959	V. T. Rajagopalan	V. Seetharaman	S. C. Krishnan, K. Jamuna Rani & P. Susheela
Penngalai Kandaale Manam Pole	Kan Thiranthathu	1959	V. T. Rajagopalan	V. Seetharaman	P. Susheela
Parandhadhe Unmai Parandhadhe	Kan Thiranthathu	1959	V. T. Rajagopalan	V. Seetharaman	
Thottakkaara Chinnmaamaa	Madhavi	1959	K. V. Mahadevan		M. S. Rajeswari
Kaalamadi Kaalam Kalikaalamadi	Madhavi	1959	K. V. Mahadevan		
Vaazhvinil Kaanum Adhisayame	Mala Oru Mangala Vilakku	1959	C. N. Pandurangan	Villiputhan	
Mogana Rangaa Ennai Paaradaa	Mamiyar Mechina Marumagal	1959	R. Sudarsanam	Kavi Rajagopal	M. L. Vasanthakumari
Thathi Thathi Tavazhum	Manaiviye Manithanin Manickam	1959	S. Hanumantha Rao	Kannadasan	P. Susheela
Manadhai Kavarndha Mangai Varuvaalo	Manimekalai	1959	G. Ramanathan	A. Maruthakasi	Radha Jayalakshmi
Unda Naali Uduttha Naanku Mulam	Manimekalai	1959	G. Ramanathan	Kambadasan	
Kannodu Kanninai Nokki	Minnal Veeran	1959	S. M. Subbaiah Naidu	Thanjai N. Ramaiah Dass	Radha Jayalakshmi
Muruga Muruga Muruga	Naalu Veli Nilam	1959	K. V. Mahadevan & M. K. Athmanathan	Mahakavi Subramania Bharathiyar	
Kaanadha Sorgam Ondru	Naan Sollum Ragasiyam	1959	G. Ramanathan	A. Maruthakasi	P. Leela
Vanna Malarodu Konjum	Naatukoru Nallaval	1959	Master Venu	M. K. Athmanathan	P. Susheela
Kannum Kannum Koodum	Naatukoru Nallaval	1959	Master Venu	M. K. Athmanathan	M. S. Rajeswari, T. K. Kumaresan & Renuka
Kaalam Varappogudhu Thannale	Naatukoru Nallaval	1959	Master Venu	M. K. Athmanathan	L. R. Eswari
Mali Pugazh Nala Saridhai	Nala Damayanthi	1959	S. M. Subbaiah Naidu	Papanasam Sivan	
Kodumai Purivadhe	Pandithevan	1959	C. N. Pandurangan & Meenakshi Subramanyam	Pattukkottai Kalyanasundaram	
Maa Manakkudhu Thaen Manakkudhu	Panchaali	1959	K. V. Mahadevan	A. Maruthakasi	Thiruchi Loganathan
Kangal Urangida Marandhidum Naal	Penn Kulathin Perumai	1959	G. Ramanathan	Thanjai N. Ramaiah Dass	P. Susheela
Vinodhamaana Ulagathile	Pennkulathin Ponvilakku	1959	Master Venu	Villiputhan	
Vizhivaasal Azhagaana Manimandapam	Pennkulathin Ponvilakku	1959	Master Venu	Villiputhan	P. Susheela
Vanakkam Vaanga Maappille	Pennkulathin Ponvilakku	1959	Master Venu	Villiputhan	P. Susheela
Mannit Pirandhaan	Ponnu Vilaiyum Boomi	1959	K. H. Reddy	Kannadasan	
Naan Suhavaasi, Dhinam Kaiveesi	President Panchatcharam	1959	G. Ramanathan	K. S. Gopalakrishnan	
Pachai Kuzhandhaiyadi Kannil	Odi Vilaiyaadu Paapa	1959	V. Krishnamoorthy	Mahakavi Subramania Bharathiyar	Radha Jayalakshmi
Odi Vilaiyaadu Paapa	Odi Vilaiyaadu Paapa	1959	V. Krishnamoorthy	Kannadasan	
Vaavendru Azhaikkudhe Thennai	Odi Vilaiyaadu Paapa	1959	V. Krishnamoorthy	Kambadasan	P. Susheela
Vaazhvadhu Endrum Unmaiye	Raja Malaiya Simman	1959	Viswanathan–Ramamoorthy	A. Maruthakasi	
Maaligaiyilae Vasikkum	Raja Malaiya Simman	1959	Viswanathan–Ramamoorthy	A. Maruthakasi	P. B. Sreenivas & G. K. Venkatesh
Jigijigichchaang Kuruvi	Raja Malaiya Simman	1959	Viswanathan–Ramamoorthy	A. Maruthakasi	K. Jamuna Rani
Jeyam Nichayamadaa	Sabash Ramu	1959	Ghantasala	Ku. Sa. Krishnamurthy	T. M. Soundararajan & A. V. Saraswathi
Sivagangai Seemai Sivagangai Seemai	Sivagangai Seemai	1959	Viswanathan–Ramamoorthy	Kannadasan	T.M. Soundararajan & A. P. Komala
Panbodu Ennaalume	Sollu Thambi Sollu	1959	K. V. Mahadevan	A. Maruthakasi	P. Susheela
Aasai Mozhi Pesuthu	Sollu Thambi Sollu	1959	K. V. Mahadevan	A. Maruthakasi	Jikki
Manidhanaagave Pirandhadhu Mannil Edhukku Theriyumaa	Sumangali	1959	M. Ranga Rao	T. S. Nadarajan	S. C. Krishnan
Manasum Manasum Onnu Serndhu	Sumangali	1959	M. Ranga Rao	T. S. Nadarajan	K. Rani
Pattikaadu Endru Keli	Sumangali	1959	M. Ranga Rao	T. S. Nadarajan	L. R. Eswari
Vidhi Seidha Sadhiyo	Sumangali	1959	M. Ranga Rao	T. S. Nadarajan	R. Balasaraswathi Devi
Aadivarum Aadangap Porpavai	Thaai Magalukku Kattiya Thaali	1959	T. R. Pappa	K. D. Santhanam	S. Janaki
Kodumaiyaadaa.. Vanampadi Ondru	Thaai Magalukku Kattiya Thaali	1959	T. R. Pappa	K. D. Santhanam	
Ondralla Irandalla Thambi	Thaai Magalukku Kattiya Thaali	1959	T. R. Pappa	Udumalai Narayana Kavi	
Thanjavoru Bommaiyai Paarungadi	Thaai Magalukku Kattiya Thaali	1959	T. R. Pappa	Udumalai Narayana Kavi	T. M. Soundararajan, P. Susheela & L. R. Eswari
Vandhen Vandhaname	Thaai Magalukku Kattiya Thaali	1959	T. R. Pappa	Kannadasan	
Thalai Koduthaan Thambi	Thalai Koduthaan Thambi	1959	Viswanathan–Ramamoorthy	A. Maruthakasi	N. L. Ganasaraswathi & S. C. Krishnan
Panneeril Thalai Muzhugi	Thalai Koduthaan Thambi	1959	Viswanathan–Ramamoorthy	A. Maruthakasi	N. L. Ganasaraswathi & S. C. Krishnan
Anaivarum Karuthudan	Thalai Koduthaan Thambi	1959	Viswanathan–Ramamoorthy	A. Maruthakasi	N. L. Ganasaraswathi & S. C. Krishnan
	Thamarai Kulam	1959	H. Padmanabha Sarma & T. A. Mothi		
Vidhi Enum Kuzhandai	Thanga Padhumai	1959	Viswanathan–Ramamoorthy	Pattukkottai Kalyanasundaram	
Paatti Sollum Kadhai	Thayapola Pillai Noolapola Selai	1959	K. V. Mahadevan	A. Maruthakasi	Thiruchi Loganathan, Soolamangalam Rajalakshmi & L. R. Eswari
Sandhoshamthaan Ini Vaazhvile	Ulagam Sirikkiradhu	1959	S. Dakshinamurthi	A. Maruthakasi	P. Susheela
O Singara Pooncholai	Uzhavukkum Thozhilukkum Vandhanai Seivom	1959	K. V. Mahadevan	A. Maruthakasi	K. Jamuna Rani
Maattukkara Vela Un	Vannakili	1959	K. V. Mahadevan	A. Maruthakasi	
Aathula Thanni Vara Athil	Vannakili	1959	K. V. Mahadevan	A. Maruthakasi	
Kaattu Mallli	Vannakili	1959	K. V. Mahadevan	A. Maruthakasi	
Vandi Urundoda Achchani	Vannakili	1959	K. V. Mahadevan	A. Maruthakasi	P. Susheela
Jakkamma	Veerapandiya Kattabomman	1959	G. Ramanathan	Ku. Ma. Balasubramaniam	
Veeraththin Chinname	Veerapandiya Kattabomman	1959	G. Ramanathan	Ku. Ma. Balasubramaniam	
Kanne Vanna Pasungkiliye	Yaanai Valartha Vanampadi	1959	Br Lakshmanan	Ku. Ma. Balasubramaniam	

=== 1960s ===
Song	Movie	Year	Music	Lyrics	Co - Singer
Aasaiyai Kondru Vidu	Aadavantha Deivam	1960	K. V. Mahadevan	A. Maruthakasi	
Kannkallum Kavi Paaduthe	Adutha Veettu Penn	1960	P. Adinarayana Rao	Thanjai N. Ramaiah Dass	Tiruchi Loganathan
Raaja Raani Naamiruvar	Anbukor Anni	1960	A. M. Rajah		K. Jamuna Rani
Atho Keerathanaa.... Manidhanai Manidhan	Deivapiravi	1960	R. Sudarsanam	K. S. Gopalakrishnan	
Kalappai Pidikkum Kaiyai Nambi	Irumanam Kalanthal Thirumanam	1960	S. Dakshinamurthi	A. Maruthakasi	
Manithadari Manidhar Sari Nigar	Irumbu Thirai	1960	S. V. Venkatraman	Pattukottai Kalyanasundaram	
Dabbaa Dabbaa Dabbaa	Irumbu Thirai	1960	S. V. Venkatraman	Pattukkottai Kalyanasundaram	
Penn Endral Paeyum Manam	Ivan Avanethan	1960	M. Ranga Rao	M. S. Subramaniam	
Anaithum Andavan Kairasi	Kairasi	1960	R. Govardhanam	Kothamangalam Subbu	
Kaadhalai Sodichchu	Kaithi Kannayiram	1960	K. V. Mahadevan	A. Maruthakasi	K. Jamuna Rani
Saala Misthri	Kaithi Kannayiram	1960	K. V. Mahadevan	A. Maruthakasi	
Sangadam Sangadam	Kaithi Kannayiram	1960	K. V. Mahadevan	A. Maruthakasi	
Virunthaagum Isai Amudham	Kuzhandhaigal Kanda Kudiyarasu	1960	T. G. Lingappa	Ku. Ma. Balasubramaniam	
Kadhar Kozhunan	Mannadhi Mannan	1960	Viswanathan–Ramamoorthy	Kannadasan	
Aadum Arul Jothi	Meenda Sorgam	1960	T. Chalapathi Rao	P. S. Gopalakrishnan	M. L. Vasanthakumari
Ungal Azhagai Kanden	Naan Kanda Sorgam	1960	G. Aswathama		S. Janaki
Paar Paar Paar Saambaaru	Naan Kanda Sorgam	1960	G. Aswathama		S. Janaki
Karakaanaathoru	Neeli Saali	1960	K. Raghavan	P. Bhaskaran	
Kalangadhe Kavalaipadadhe	Ondrupattal Undu Vazhvu	1960	Viswanathan–Ramamoorthy	Pattukkottai Kalyanasundaram	K. Jamuna Rani, S. C. Krishnan & L. R. Eswari
Unmaiyai Sonnavanai Ulagam	Ondrupattal Undu Vazhvu	1960	Viswanathan–Ramamoorthy	Pattukkottai Kalyanasundaram	
Engirundho Vandhan	Padikkadha Medhai	1960	K. V. Mahadevan	Mahakavi Bharathiyar	
Thaalamesthri Pista Paaru	Padikkadha Medhai	1960	K. V. Mahadevan	A. Maruthakasi	
Hat Nagaeregamaana Hattu	Pattaliyin Vetri	1960	S. Rajeswara Rao & Master Venu	Udumalai Narayana Kavi	
Gama Gama Gamangkudhu	Pattaliyin Vetri	1960	S. Rajeswara Rao & Master Venu	Udumalai Narayana Kavi	P. Leela
Cinema Cinema Cinema	Petra Manam	1960	S. Rajeswara Rao	M. K. Athamanathan	
Anbu Thozhaa Odi Vaa	Petra Manam	1960	S. Rajeswara Rao	Ku. Mu. Annalthango	
Puthiyathor Ulagam Seyvom	Petra Manam	1960	S. Rajeswara Rao	Bharathidasan	
Pasandhaina Paata Idhe	Pillalu Techina Challani Rajyam	1960	T. G. Lingappa	Samudrala Sr.	
Karumbu Villai Eduthu	Ponni Thirunaal	1960	K. V. Mahadevan	Thanjai N. Ramaiah Dass	A. L. Raghavan, Thiruchi Loganathan, S. V. Ponnusamy & L. R. Eswari
Pongi Varum Kaviriye	Ponni Thirunaal	1960	K. V. Mahadevan	A. Maruthakasi	Thiruchi Loganathan, Soolamangalam Rajalakshmi & L. R. Eswari
Aadhi Kadavul Ondruthan	Raja Desingu	1960	G. Ramanathan		
Kanangkuruvi Kaattuppuraa	Raja Desingu	1960	G. Ramanathan		P. Leela
Mannavane Senji	Raja Desingu	1960	G. Ramanathan		P. Leela
Vanamevum Rajakumaraa	Raja Desingu	1960	G. Ramanathan	Thanjai N. Ramaiah Dass	Jikki
Vandhaan Paaru	Raja Desingu	1960	G. Ramanathan	Thanjai N. Ramaiah Dass	P. Leela
Iravinil Vandhadheno.... Ooredhu Peredhu O Vennilaave	Raja Makudam	1960	Master Venu	Thanjai N. Ramaiah Dass	P. Leela
Munnale Povanum Thirumbalaama	Raja Makudam	1960	Master Venu	Thanjai N. Ramaiah Dass	
Sangeetham Paadi Sandhosham	Thangam Manasu Thangam	1960	K. V. Mahadevan	A. Maruthakasi	Jikki
Sirikkudhu Mullai	Thangam Manasu Thangam	1960	K. V. Mahadevan	A. Maruthakasi	P. Susheela
Pongum Azhagu Pootthu	Thangam Manasu Thangam	1960	K. V. Mahadevan	A. Maruthakasi	P. Susheela
Manasukkulle Maraichu Vaikka Mudiyale	Thilakam	1960	R. Sudarsanam	M. K. Athmanathan	M. L. Vasanthakumari
Ezhaikkum Vaazhvukkum Vegudhooramaa	Thilakam	1960	R. Sudarsanam	Kavi Rajagopal	M. L. Vasanthakumari & T. S. Bagavathi
Uyir Illaamal Ulaginile	Thozhan	1960	G. Ramanathan	A. Maruthakasi	Jikki
Chithirame Chithirame	Veerakkanal	1960	K. V. Mahadevan	Kannadasan	P. Susheela
Kaikal Irandil	Veerakkanal	1960	K. V. Mahadevan	Kannadasan	P. Susheela
Thanga Kiliye Mozhi Pesu	Veerakkanal	1960	K. V. Mahadevan	Kannadasan	P. Susheela
Sengani Vaai Thirandhu Sirithiduvai	Yanai Paagan	1960	K. V. Mahadevan	Kannadasan	P. Susheela
O Maappillai Machaan	Anbu Magan	1961	T. Chalapathi Rao	A. S. Rajagopal	S. Janaki
Etramunnaa Etram	Arasilangkumari	1961	G. Ramanathan	Pattukottai Kalyanasundaram	T. M. Soundararajan
Kazhugumalai Pazhanimalai	Arasilangkumari	1961	G. Ramanathan	Pattukottai Kalyanasundaram	
Thoondilile Mattikittu Muzhikuthu	Arasilangkumari	1961	G. Ramanathan	N. M. Muthukoothan	K. Jamuna Rani & S. C. Krishnan
Sivasankari Sivanandalahari	Jagathalaprathapan	1961	Pendyala Nageswara Rao	Pingali Nagendra Rao	
Nenjil Uramumindri	Kappalottiya Thamizhan	1961	G. Ramanathan	Subramania Bharathiyar	
Odi Vilaiyaadu Pappaa	Kappalottiya Thamizhan	1961	G. Ramanathan	Subramania Bharathiyar	K. Jamuna Rani & Rohini
Paarukkulle Nalla Naadu	Kappalottiya Thamizhan	1961	G. Ramanathan	Subramania Bharathiyar	
Vandhe Maatharam Enbom	Kappalottiya Thamizhan	1961	G. Ramanathan	Subramania Bharathiyar	
Vellippani Malai	Kappalottiya Thamizhan	1961	G. Ramanathan	Subramania Bharathiyar	Tiruchi Loganathan, L. R. Eswari & Rohini
Kandadhai Kettadhai Nambaadhe	Kongunattu Thangam	1961	K. V. Mahadevan	A. Maruthakasi	
Karumbaaga Inikkindra Paruvam	Kongunattu Thangam	1961	K. V. Mahadevan	Kovai Kumaradevan	P. Susheela
Nenjinile Enna Veeram	Kongunattu Thangam	1961	K. V. Mahadevan	A. Maruthakasi	P. Susheela
Kallile Kalai Vannam Kandan	Kumudham	1961	K. V. Mahadevan	Kannadasan	
Ennai Vittu Odi Poga Mudiyuma	Kumudham	1961	K. V. Mahadevan	A. Maruthakasi	P. Susheela
Baila Baila Cycle	Mamiyarum Oru Veetu Marumagale	1961	Pendyala Nageswara Rao	A. Maruthakasi	Jikki
Vaayendru Sonnadhum Vandhaaye	Mamiyarum Oru Veetu Marumagale	1961	Pendyala Nageswara Rao	A. Maruthakasi	Jikki
Aandavn Oruvan Irukkindraan	Nallavan Vazhvan	1961	T. R. Pappa	M. K. Athmanathan	
Anbukkarathale.. Kuthala Aruviyile Kulichathu	Nallavan Vazhvan	1961	T. R. Pappa	Vaali	P. Leela
Sirikindraal Indru Sirikindraal	Nallavan Vazhvan	1961	T. R. Pappa	Vaali	P. Susheela
Panam Panthiyile Gunam Kuppaiyile	Panam Panthiyile	1961	K. V. Mahadevan	Ka. Mu. Sheriff	
Maamiyaarukku Oru Seidhi	Panithirai	1961	K. V. Mahadevan	Kannadasan	T. V. Rathnam
Naanillai Endral	Punar Janmam	1961	T. Chalapathi Rao	Pattukottai Kalyanasundaram	S. Janaki & A. V. Saraswathi
Jidu Jidu	Sabaash Mapillai	1961	K. V. Mahadevan	A. Maruthakasi	
Mappillai	Sabaash Mapillai	1961	K. V. Mahadevan	A. Maruthakasi	P. Susheela
Manathil Irukuthu Onnu	Sabaash Mapillai	1961	K. V. Mahadevan	A. Maruthakasi	P. Susheela
Muthu Pole	Sabaash Mapillai	1961	K. V. Mahadevan	A. Maruthakasi	Soolamangalam Rajalakshmi
Sirippavar Silaper	Sabaash Mapillai	1961	K. V. Mahadevan	A. Maruthakasi	
Yaarukku Yaar Sondham - Happy	Sabaash Mapillai	1961	K. V. Mahadevan	A. Maruthakasi	P. Susheela
Yaarukku Yaar Sondham - Sad	Sabaash Mapillai	1961	K. V. Mahadevan	A. Maruthakasi	
Vigna Vinaayagaa	Sri Valli	1961	G. Ramanathan	Thanjai N. Ramaiah Dass	
Vanna Thaamaraiyil Minnum Neerkumizhi	Sri Valli	1961	G. Ramanathan	Thanjai N. Ramaiah Dass	
Yechuputten Naan Yechuputten	Sri Valli	1961	G. Ramanathan	Thanjai N. Ramaiah Dass	P. Susheela
Thaagam Thanindhadhu Anname	Sri Valli	1961	G. Ramanathan	Thanjai N. Ramaiah Dass	P. Susheela
Vamma Vamma Chinnamma Vayasu	Thayilla Pillai	1961	K. V. Mahadevan	Kannadasan	P. Susheela
Aasey Machchan.... Azhagaana Chinna Ponnu	Thirudadhe	1961	S. M. Subbaiah Naidu	Ku. Sa. Krishnamoorthi	Jikki
Anbale Thannuyirai	Thirudadhe	1961	S. M. Subbaiah Naidu	M. K. Athmanathan	
Neethine Gattiga Nammali	Viplava Sthree	1961	Pamarthi	Samudrala Jr.	
Kalanugani Ninnalanuganee	Yodhana Yodhulu	1961	G. Aswathama	Narapa Reddy	Nirmala
Bharathveera O Bharatha Veera	Yodhana Yodhulu	1961	G. Aswathama	Sriramchand	Raghuram & Vijayalakshmi
Veeranivasam Bharathadesham	Yodhana Yodhulu	1961	G. Aswathama	Sriramchand	
Annaiyin Arule Vaa	Aadi Perukku	1962	A. M. Rajah	Kothamangalam Subbu	
Kannana Kannanukku Avasarama	Aalayamani	1962	Viswanathan–Ramamoorthy	Kannadasan	P. Susheela
Moongil Maarakkattinile	Azhagu Nila	1962	K. V. Mahadevan	A. Maruthakasi	P. Susheela
Manithan Ellam Therindhu Kondan	Azhagu Nila	1962	K. V. Mahadevan	A. Maruthakasi	
Kaattu Kuyilukkum Naattu Kuyilukkum	Azhagu Nila	1962	K. V. Mahadevan	A. Maruthakasi	P. Susheela
Nitham Nitham	Bandha Pasam	1962	Viswanathan–Ramamoorthy	Mayavanathan	
Hrdayamulu Pulakinnchavo	Ekaika Veerudu	1962	Viswanathan–Ramamoorthy & S. P. Kodandapani	Veturi	M. L. Vasanthakumari
Vidiyum Varai Kaatthirupen	Ellorum Vazhavendum	1962	Rajan–Nagendra	Villiputhan	
Odam Nadhiyinile	Kathiruntha Kangal	1962	Viswanathan–Ramamoorthy	Kannadasan	
Kaalai Pozhudhe Namaskaaram	Mahaveera Bheeman	1962	M. S. Gnanamani	T. K. Sundara Vathiyar	
Om Sarvam Sakthi Mayam	Manithan Maravillai	1962	Ghantasala	Thanjai N. Ramaiah Dass	
Podu Podu Thekka Thillana	Manithan Maravillai	1962	Ghantasala	Thanjai N. Ramaiah Dass	Ghantasala, P. Susheela & P. Leela
Kaalathai Mattrinaan (Manithan Maravillai)	Manithan Maravillai	1962	Ghantasala	Kannadasan	P. Leela
Naagam Kudai Pidikka	Naagamalai Azhagi	1962	S. P. Kodandapani & T. A. Mothi	Elangkavi Muthukoothan	
Vengaikku Kurivaithu	Paasam	1962	Viswanathan–Ramamoorthy	Kannadasan	
Malligai Mullai Narumamanum	Pirandhanaal	1962	K. V. Mahadevan	A. Maruthakasi	K. Jamuna Rani
Ellam Thirai Maraive	Pirandhanaal	1962	K. V. Mahadevan	A. Maruthakasi	
Sanjalam Theerkkum Marundhu	Pirandhanaal	1962	K. V. Mahadevan	A. Maruthakasi	
Konthu Tharu Kuzhal Irulo Puyalo	Pirandhanaal	1962	K. V. Mahadevan	A. Maruthakasi	
Kannile Neer Edharku	Policekaran Magal	1962	Viswanathan–Ramamoorthy	Kannadasan	S. Janaki
Thattu Thadumaari Nenjam	Sarada	1962	K. V. Mahadevan	Kannadasan	L. R. Eswari
Kandathu Ondru Kettadhu Ondru	Seemaan Petra Selvangal	1962	T. R. Pappa	Kavi Rajagopal	
Mangili Rangammaa	Vikramaadhithan	1962	S. Rajeswara Rao	Clown Sundaram	Jikki
Pazhatthai Kandey Oru	Aasthikoru Aanum Aasaikkoru Pennum	1963	K. V. Mahadevan	A. Maruthakasi	P. Susheela
Pirivu Embadhu Endrum Illai	Aasthikoru Aanum Aasaikkoru Pennum	1963	K. V. Mahadevan	A. Maruthakasi	P. Susheela
Anbu Embathu Deivamanathu	Aasai Alaigal	1963	K. V. Mahadevan	Kannadasan	K. Jamuna Rani & L. R. Eswari
Anbu Embathu Deivamanthu -2	Aasai Alaigal	1963	K. V. Mahadevan	Kannadasan	K. Jamuna Rani & L. R. Eswari
Parthukondirundhale Podhum	Chittoor Rani Padmini	1963	G. Ramanathan	Udumalai Narayana Kavi	
Oho Nila Raani	Chittoor Rani Padmini	1963	G. Ramanathan	Ku. Ma. Balasubramaniam	
Chittu Sirippadhu Pole	Chittoor Rani Padmini	1963	G. Ramanathan	Kannadasan	P. Susheela
Singara Therukku	Idhu Sathiyam	1963	Viswanathan–Ramamoorthy	Kannadasan	L. R. Eswari
Nee Iruppadhu Inge Un Ninaiviruppadhu Enge	Kalai Arasi	1963	K. V. Mahadevan	N. M. Muthukoothan	P. Susheela
Kalaiye Un Ezhi Meni	Kalai Arasi	1963	K. V. Mahadevan	Kannadasan	P. Bhanumathi
Adhisayam Paarthen Mannile	Kalai Arasi	1963	K. V. Mahadevan	Pattukkottai Kalyanasundaram	
Paalaattril Selaadudhu	Koduthu Vaithaval	1963	K. V. Mahadevan	Kannadasan	K. Jamuna Rani
Vidhiyennum Kuzhandhai Vilaiyaaduthu	Kubera Theevu	1963	C. N. Pandurangan	Veppathur Krishnan	
Ponggum Olimayame	Lava Kusa	1963	K. V. Mahadevan & Ghantasala	A. Maruthakasi	
Devan Kovil Mani Osai	Mani Osai	1963	Viswanathan–Ramamoorthy	Kannadasan	
Gundu Malli Valarndhirukku	Punithavathi	1963	Hussein Reddy	Surabhi	A. P. Komala
Aann Onru Nalla Penn Onru	Punithavathi	1963	Hussein Reddy	Surabhi	
Deva Deva Narayana	Sri Krishnarjuna Yudham	1963	Pendyala Nageswara Rao	Thanjai N. Ramaiah Dass	
Pottu Vachu Poo Mudichu	Veera Thilagam	1963	S. P. Kodandapani		L. R. Eswari
Unmaikku Veliyittu	Dheiva Thaai	1964	Viswanathan–Ramamoorthy	Alangudi Somu	
Kaadhalikka Neramillai	Kadhalikka Neramillai	1964	Viswanathan–Ramamoorthy	Kannadasan	
Maranathai Enni	Karnan	1964	Viswanathan–Ramamoorthy	Kannadasan	
Ullathil Nalla Ullam	Karnan	1964	Viswanathan–Ramamoorthy	Kannadasan	
Parithraanaaya Sathunaa	Karnan	1964	Viswanathan–Ramamoorthy	Kannadasan	
Aayiram Karangal Neetti	Karnan	1964	Viswanathan–Ramamoorthy	Kannadasan	T. M. Soundararajan, Tiruchi Loganathan & P. B. Sreenivas
Bhuvilo Dehammu	Karna	1964	Viswanathan–Ramamoorthy		
Ellarum Ellamum Pera Vendum	Karuppu Panam	1964	Viswanathan–Ramamoorthy	Kannadasan	Chorus
Irakka Irakka	Karuppu Panam	1964	Viswanathan–Ramamoorthy	Kannadasan	
Thangachi Chinna Ponnu	Karuppu Panam	1964	Viswanathan–Ramamoorthy	Kannadasan	L. R. Eswari
Kottaiyile Oru Aalamaram	Muradan Muthu	1964	T. G. Lingappa	Kannadasan	
Ye Deshamuna Nunduvaru	Ramadasu	1964	G. Ashwathama & V. Nagayya		V. N. Sundaram & Madhavapeddi Satyam
Aazham Theriyamaal Kaalai	Thozhilali	1964	K. V. Mahadevan	Alangudi Somu	L. R. Eswari
Arasi Endraal Enna	Veeranganai	1964	Vedha	A. Maruthakasi	
Kanden Kanden Unnai	Veera Pandiyan	1964	Rajan–Nagendra	Puratchidasan	
Laddu Laddu Laddu	Veerathi Veeran	1964	Rajan–Nagendra	Puratchidasan	S. Janaki
Sokam Pongenule	Andhi Andhani Prema	1965	K. Chakravarthy	Anisetti	
Kalaithanil	Ennathan Mudivu	1965	R. Sudarsanam	Kothamangalam Subbu	L. R. Eswari
Iyarkkai Annai Thandhadhellam	Enga Veetu Penn	1965	K. V. Mahadevan	Alangudi Somu	
Koothaadum Kondaiyile	Iravum Pagalum	1965	T. R. Pappa	Alangudi Somu	P. Susheela
Sange Muzhangu	Kalangarai Vilakkam	1965	M. S. Viswanathan	Bharathidasan	P. Susheela
Kalai Manggai Uruvam Kandu	Maganey Kel	1965	Viswanathan–Ramamoorthy	Pattukkottai Kalyanasundaram	M. L. Vasanthakumari
Aadi Adangum Vaazhkaiyadaa	Neerkumizhi	1965	V. Kumar	Suratha	
Aarodum Mannil Engum Neerodum	Pazhani	1965	Viswanathan–Ramamoorthy	Kannadasan	T. M. Soundararajan & P. B. Sreenivas
Vatta Vatta Paarayile	Pazhani	1965	Viswanathan–Ramamoorthy	Kannadasan	P. Susheela
Annaachi Veeti Kattum Aambalaiyaa Neenga	Pazhani	1965	Viswanathan–Ramamoorthy	Kannadasan	T. M. Soundararajan, S. C. Krishnan, A. L. Raghavan & L. R. Eswari
Ven Palingu Medai	Poojaikku Vandha Malar	1965	Viswanathan–Ramamoorthy	Alangudi Somu	L. R. Eswari
Karuneela Malai	Thaaye Unakkaga	1965	K. V. Mahadevan	Kannadasan	
Pazhagu Senthamil	Thaaye Unakkaga	1965	K. V. Mahadevan	Kannadasan	
Oru Kodi Paadalukkum	Thayin Karunai	1965	G. K. Venkatesh	Mayavanathan	
Thayin Karunai	Thayin Karunai	1965	G. K. Venkatesh	A. Maruthakasi	
Om Namasivaya	Thiruvilayadal	1965	K. V. Mahadevan	Kannadasan	P. Susheela
Pazhani Santhana Vaadai	Vaazhkai Padagu	1965	Viswanathan–Ramamoorthy	Kannadasan	L. R. Eswari
Paaradi Kanne Konjam	Vallavanukku Vallavan	1965	Vedha	Kannadasan	T. M. Soundararajan & P. Susheela
Kandaalum Kandene	Vallavanukku Vallavan	1965	Vedha	Kannadasan	L. R. Eswari
Maa Manakkuthu Poo	Vallavanukku Vallavan	1965	Vedha	Kannadasan	L. R. Eswari
Yugam Thorum Naan	Veera Abhimanyu	1965	K. V. Mahadevan	Kannadasan	
Thuvakathil	Veera Abhimanyu	1965	K. V. Mahadevan	Kannadasan	
Koorayil Neruppinai	Veera Abhimanyu	1965	K. V. Mahadevan	Kannadasan	
Kaasikku Pogum Sanyasi Un	Chandhrodhayam	1966	M. S. Viswanathan	Vaali	T. M. Soundararajan
Pudhiyadhor Ulagam Seivom	Chandhrodhayam	1966	M. S. Viswanathan	Bharathidasan	Chorus
Sirippen Sirippen	Chinnanchiru Ulagam	1966	K. V. Mahadevan	Vaali	L. R. Eswari
Cycle Vandi Mele	Chitthi	1966	M. S. Viswanathan	Kannadasan	
	Enga Pappa	1966	M. S. Viswanathan	Kannadasan	
Kaadhal Undagum Kattazhagi	Iru Vallavargal	1966	Vedha	Kannadasan	L. R. Eswari
Uravirundhal Pirivirukkum	Iru Vallavargal	1966	Vedha	Kannadasan	
Sangadam Sangadam	Iru Vallavargal	1966	Vedha	Kannadasan	
Kanagaththai Thedi Indru Pogiraal	Kodimalar	1966	M. S. Viswanathan	Kannadasan	
Yeira Yenkannadora	Loguttu Perumaallu Keruka	1966	S. P. Kodandapani	Veturi	S. Janaki, Pithapuram Nageswara Rao & Pattabhi
Thuninthu Nil	Major Chandrakanth	1966	V. Kumar	Suratha	
Penna Maanthartham (Penmai Endra)	Motor Sundaram Pillai	1966	M. S. Viswanathan	Kothamangalam Subbu	
Megangal Irundu (Odi Vandhu)	Naan Aanaiyittal	1966	M. S. Viswanathan	Alangudi Somu	P. Susheela
Nalla Manaivi Nalla Pillai	Namma Veettu Lakshmi	1966	M. S. Viswanathan	Kannadasan	
Panam Irundhaal	Namma Veettu Lakshmi	1966	M. S. Viswanathan	Kannadasan	
Nalla Nalla Pillaigalai	Petralthan Pillaiya	1966	M. S. Viswanathan	Vaali	P. Susheela
Kannan Vandhan Ange Kannan	Ramu	1966	M. S. Viswanathan	Kannadasan	T. M. Soundararajan
Azhagirukkuthu Ulagile Aasai Irukkuthu	Anubavi Raja Anubavi	1967	M. S. Viswanathan	Kannadasan	T. M. Soundararajan
Jilukkadi Jilukkadi	Ethirigal Jakkirathai	1967	Vedha	Kannadasan	T. M. Soundararajan, P. Susheela & L. R. Eswari
Ponne Vachaan	Kadhalithal Podhuma	1967	Vedha	Kannadasan	L. R. Eswari
Aarupadai Veedu Konda Thiru Muruga	Kandhan Karunai	1967	K. V. Mahadevan	Kannadasan	
Beautiful Marvelous Excellent	Manam Oru Kurangu	1967	D. B. Ramachandra		L. R. Eswari
Ammano Samiyo Athaiyo Mamiyo	Naan	1967	T. K. Ramamoorthy	Kannadasan	L. R. Eswari
Sanyasamendhuku Chalinchu	Pellante Bhayam	1967	M. S. Viswanathan	Sri Sri	T. M. Soundararajan
Naadi Thudikkudhu	Seetha	1967	K. V. Mahadevan	Kannadasan	P. Susheela
Etraan Marakken	Sundaramurthi Nayanar	1967	S. M. Subbaiah Naidu	Sundarar	
Ponnaar Meniyane	Sundaramurthi Nayanar	1967	S. M. Subbaiah Naidu	Sundarar	
Mealaa Adimai Umakke	Sundaramurthi Nayanar	1967	S. M. Subbaiah Naidu	Sundarar	
Verutthen Manai Vaazhkaiyai	Sundaramurthi Nayanar	1967	S. M. Subbaiah Naidu	Sundarar	
Thillai Vaazh Andhanar	Sundaramurthi Nayanar	1967	S. M. Subbaiah Naidu	Sundarar	
Irukkum Idathai Vittu Illadha Idam	Thiruvarutchelvar	1967	K. V. Mahadevan	Kannadasan	
Om Namasivaya	Thiruvarutchelvar	1967	K. V. Mahadevan	Kannadasan	P. Susheela
Munthi Munthi Vinayaganeya	En Thambi	1968	M. S. Viswanathan	Kannadasan	L. R. Eswari
Vetri Venduma Pottu Parada Ethir Neechal	Ethir Neechal	1968	V. Kumar	Vaali	
Raman Embathu Sindhu (Devan Vandhan)	Kuzhanthaikkaga	1968	M. S. Viswanathan	Kannadasan	T. M. Soundararajan & P. B. Sreenivas
Thanga Therodrum	Lakshmi Kalyanam	1968	M. S. Viswanathan	Mayavanathan	T. M. Soundararajan
Maampazha Thottam	Oli Vilakku	1968	M. S. Viswanathan	Vaali	L. R. Eswari
Vanathai Kadavul Thalaiyal	Teacheramma	1968	T. R. Pappa	Kannadasan	
Kutrala Malaiyile	Uyira Maanama	1968	M. S. Viswanathan	Kannadasan	L. R. Eswari
Paattodu Raagam Inge	Akka Thangai	1969	Shankar–Ganesh	Kannadasan	
Gopalan Enge Undo	Anbalippu	1969	M. S. Viswanathan	Kannadasan	T. M. Soundararajan, P. Susheela, L. R. Eswari & Tharapuram Sundararajan
En Vesha Porutham	Anbalippu	1969	M. S. Viswanathan	Kannadasan	T. M. Soundararajan
Kangalal Pesuthamma	Deiva Magan	1969	M. S. Viswanathan	Kannadasan	
Paaru Paaru Nallaapaaru	Gurudhakshaneiy	1969	Pukazhenthi	Kannadasan	
Kudagu Naadu Ponni	Kuzhandai Ullam	1969	S. P. Kodandapani	Kannadasan	P. Susheela
Azhagu Mayil Kolamenna	Magane Nee Vaazhga	1969	M. S. Viswanathan	Kannadasan	
Tanakku Tanakku Endru	Magizhampoo	1969	D. B. Ramachandra	Mayavanathan	T. M. Soundararajan
Ulagam Suzhalgindradhu.... Kadavul Thoongavillai	Mannippu	1969	S. M. Subbaiah Naidu	Vaali	
Poovaa Thalaiyaa	Poova Thalaiya	1969	M. S. Viswanathan	Vaali	T. M. Soundararajan
Naalai Pozhudhu Undhan	Porchilai	1969	R. Govardhanam	Kannadasan	
Ammaa Un Maganodu	Sivandha Mann	1969	M. S. Viswanathan	Kannadasan	
Aandukku Aandu Thedhikku Thedhi	Suba Dhinam	1969	K. V. Mahadevan	Vaali	
Pozhudhu Vidinjaa	Suba Dhinam	1969	K. V. Mahadevan	Vaali	L. R. Eswari
Ooraanda Mannarukkum	Thalattu	1969	M. L. Srikanth	Mayavanathan	
Naan Pirandha Naattu	Thanga Surangam	1969	T. K. Ramamurthy	Kannadasan	T. M. Soundararajan
Iraivan Padaittha Ulagil Ellaam	Vaa Raja Vaa	1969	Kunnakudi Vaidyanathan	Ulunthurpettai Shanmugam	
Kallamilla Pillaiyidam.... Siru Kuzhandhai Vadivile	Vaa Raja Vaa	1969	Kunnakudi Vaidyanathan	Azha. Valliappa	

=== 1970s ===
Song	Movie	Year	Music	Lyrics	Co - Singer
Azhaitthavar Kuralukku	Anadhai Anandhan	1970	K. V. Mahadevan	Kannadasan	
Sakunthalai Dushyanthan	Engirundho Vandhaal	1970	M. S. Viswanathan	Kannadasan	P. Leela
Un Mela Konda Aasa	Kaadhal Jothi	1970	T. K. Ramamoorthy	C. N. Annadurai	
Sattai Kail Kondu	Kaadhal Jothi	1970	T. K. Ramamoorthy	Subbu Arumugam	
Maalaiyittom Pongalittom	Kalam Vellum	1970	Shankar–Ganesh	Kannadasan	L. R. Eswari
	Malathi	1970	M. S. Viswanathan	Kannadasan	
Seethakkalappa	Namma Kuzhandaigal	1970	M. S. Viswanathan	Kannadasan	
Kalaam Kadanthum	Paadhukaappu	1970	M. S. Viswanathan	Kannadasan	
Sri Chamundeshwari	Sri Krishnadevaraya	1970	T. G. Lingappa	K. Prabhakara Shastry	P. Leela
Makkal Nakkare	Sri Krishnadevaraya	1970	T. G. Lingappa		
Thirupathi Malai Vaazhum	Thirumalai Thenkumari	1970	Kunnakudi Vaidyanathan	Ulundurpettai Shanmugam	
Guruvayurappa Thiruvarul	Thirumalai Thenkumari	1970	Kunnakudi Vaidyanathan	Poovai Senguttuvan	
Madurai Arasalum Meenakshi	Thirumalai Thenkumari	1970	Kunnakudi Vaidyanathan	Ulundurpettai Shanmugam	L. R. Eswari & M. R. Vijaya
Sinthaiyil Medai Katti	Thirumalai Thenkumari	1970	Kunnakudi Vaidyanathan	Thenkatchi Bharathisami	Sarala
Thiral Mani Kathirgal	Thirumalai Thenkumari	1970	Kunnakudi Vaidyanathan		L. R. Eswari
Azhage Thamizhe (4 language song)	Thirumalai Thenkumari	1970	Kunnakudi Vaidyanathan	Sailasri (Kannada), Ramsri (Telugu), Job (Malayalam)	Sarala, M. R. Vijaya, Manorama, L. R. Anjali, Dharapuram Sundararajan & A. L. Raghavan
Thandhanatthom Endru Solliye	Yaen?	1970	T. R. Pappa	Subbu Arumugam	
Aathadi Mariyamma Soru	Aathi Parasakthi	1971	K. V. Mahadevan	Kannadasan	
Thenmadhurai Veethiyile	Anbukkor Annan	1971	M. S. Viswanathan	Kannadasan	T. M. Soundararajan
Petra Thaaithanai Maga	Arutperunjothi	1971	T. R. Pappa	Ramalinga Swamigal	
Varuvaar Azhaitthu Vaadi	Arutperunjothi	1971	T. R. Pappa	Ramalinga Swamigal	
Paartthaalum Ninaitthaalum	Arutperunjothi	1971	T. R. Pappa	Ramalinga Swamigal	
Thaayilaar Ena Nenjagam	Arutperunjothi	1971	T. R. Pappa	Ramalinga Swamigal	
Aadhi Mudhale	Babu	1971	M. S. Viswanathan	Vaali	T. M. Soundararajan, L. R. Eswari & S. C. Krishnan
Agaram Thamizhukku Sigaram	Iru Thuruvam	1971	M. S. Viswanathan	Kannadasan	Chorus
Thullivarum Sooraikkatru	Iru Thuruvam	1971	M. S. Viswanathan	Kannadasan	
Idhu Neerodu Selgindra Odam	Justice Viswanathan	1971	Vedha	Kannadasan	
Aaya Kalaigal	Kankatchi	1971	Kunnakudi Vaidyanathan		
Tirupathi Sendru Thirumbi Vandhaal	Moondru Dheivangal	1971	M. S. Viswanathan	Kannadasan	
Paalam Boomi Naduvinil	Naangu Suvargal	1971	M. S. Viswanathan	Kannadasan	
Paalam Boomi Naduvinil (Bit)	Naangu Suvargal	1971	M. S. Viswanathan	Kannadasan	
Boologama	Nootrukku Nooru	1971	V. Kumar	Vaali	L. R. Eswari
Kodaiyile Mazhai Pozhinju	Needhi Dhevan	1971	K. V. Mahadevan	Kannadasan	L. R. Eswari
Ninaippadhu Nadappadhillai	Pattondru Ketten	1971	C. Ramchandra	Kannadasan	P. Susheela
Nenjukku Neethi Undu	Sabatham	1971	G. K. Venkatesh	Kannadasan	L. R. Eswari
Thaipoosa Kaavadiyattam	Thulli Odum Pullimaan	1971	K. V. Mahadevan	Kannadasan	
Kondu Vaa Needhi	Veettukoru Pillai	1971	M. S. Viswanathan	Kannadasan	T. M. Soundararajan L. R. Eswari
Ulagam Samanilai Pera Vendum	Agathiyar	1972	Kunnakudi Vaidyanathan	Ulundurpettai Shanmugam	
Vedriduven Unnai Vedriduven	Agathiyar	1972	Kunnakudi Vaidyanathan	Ulundurpettai Shanmugam	T. M. Soundararajan
Nadanthaai Vaazhi Kaviri	Agathiyar	1972	Kunnakudi Vaidyanathan	K. D. Santhanam	
Isaiyaai Thamizhaai Iruppavane	Agathiyar	1972	Kunnakudi Vaidyanathan	K. D. Santhanam	T. R. Mahalingam
Namachivayam Ena Solvome	Agathiyar	1972	Kunnakudi Vaidyanathan	Era. Pazhanisamy	T. R. Mahalingam
Thanga Radham	Appa Tata	1972	M. S. Viswanathan		
Kelliro Anbu Kattum Pillaiyellam	Ashirvadham	1972	M. S. Viswanathan	Kannadasan	
Dharmam Engey	Dharmam Engey	1972	M. S. Viswanathan	Kannadasan	P. Susheela
Thiruchendoorin Kadalorathil	Dheivam	1972	Kunnakudi Vaidyanathan	Kannadasan	T. M. Soundararajan
Kaattradikkum Thisaiyinile	Dhikku Theriyadha Kaattil	1972	M. S. Viswanathan	Vaali	
Anbukondu Paarpadharku	Ellai Kodu	1972	K. V. Mahadevan	Kannadasan	
Naattukkulle Pala Sathi	Kurathi Magan	1972	K. V. Mahadevan	Udumalai Narayana Kavi	L. R. Eswari
Angamellam Thangamo	Vazhaiyadi Vazhai	1972	Kunnakudi Vaidyanathan	Udumalai Narayana Kavi	
Aadhi Baghavan	Ganga Gowri	1973	M. S. Viswanathan	Kannadasan	
Yaenda Dai	Kattila Thottila	1973	V. Kumar	Vaali	
Muruganukku Mootthavane	Malligai Poo	1973	V. Kumar	Vaali	P. Leela, K. Swarna. S. C. Krishnan & S. V. Ponnusamy
Than Seemaiyile Oru	Manipayal	1973	M. S. Viswanathan	Pulamaipithan	
Aadu Raatte	Nathayil Muthu	1973	Shankar–Ganesh	Vaali	Radha Jayalakshmi
Thanjavooru Seemaiyile	Ponnukku Thanga Manasu	1973	G. K. Venkatesh	Muthulingam	S. Janaki, B. S. Sasirekha & Poorani
Hari Hari Giridhari	Radha	1973	Shankar–Ganesh	Vaali	P. Susheela
Thanjai Periya Kovil	Rajaraja Cholan	1973	Kunnakudi Vaidyanathan	Kannadasan	T. R. Mahalingam & S. Varalakshmi
Eadu Thanthanaadi Thillaiyile	Rajaraja Cholan	1973	Kunnakudi Vaidyanathan	Kannadasan	S. Varalakshmi
Unkaiyil En Pillai	Rajaraja Cholan	1973	Kunnakudi Vaidyanathan	Ulundurpettai Shanmugam	
Vetriyai Naalai	Ulagam Sutrum Valiban	1973	M. S. Viswanathan	Pulavar Vedha	
Thunivae Thunai	Vandhaale Magaraasi	1973	Shankar–Ganesh	Vaali	P. Susheela
Raakkamma Raani Ava	Vandhaale Magaraasi	1973	Shankar–Ganesh	Vaali	T. M. Soundararajan
Ennai Paartthu	Gumasthavin Magal	1974	Kunnakudi Vaidyanathan	Poovai Senguttuvan	
Neenga Nalla Irukkanum Naadu	Idhayakkani	1975	M. S. Viswanathan	Pulamaipithan	T. M. Soundararajan & S. Janaki
Kaavalukku Velundu	Manidhanum Dheivamagalam	1975	Kunnakudi Vaidyanathan	Kannadasan	
Vetrivel Vellumada	Manidhanum Dheivamagalam	1975	Kunnakudi Vaidyanathan	Kannadasan	T. M. Soundararajan
Ennada Thamizh Kumara	Manidhanum Dheivamagalam	1975	Kunnakudi Vaidyanathan	Kannadasan	
Malaikalil Sirandha Malai Maruthamalai	Thiruvarul	1975	Kunnakudi Vaidyanathan	Kannadasan	
Oru Kodi Aasaigal	Uravukku Kai Koduppom	1975	D. B. Ramachandra	A. Maruthakasi	Vani Jayaram
Koduppom Kai Koduppom	Uravukku Kai Koduppom	1975	D. B. Ramachandra	A. Maruthakasi	
Odugindral Urulugindral Edhaiyo	Bhadrakali	1976	Ilaiyaraaja	Vaali	
Santhaakaaram Pujaga Sayanam	Dasavatharam	1976	S. Rajeswara Rao		
Hari Narayana Ennum	Dasavatharam	1976	S. Rajeswara Rao	A. Maruthakasi	
Narayana Ennum Naamam	Dasavatharam	1976	S. Rajeswara Rao	A. Maruthakasi	
Moovadi Mann Kettu	Dasavatharam	1976	S. Rajeswara Rao	A. Maruthakasi	
Thaayinum Paaramal	Dasavatharam	1976	S. Rajeswara Rao	A. Maruthakasi	
Thanthai Sol Mikka	Dasavatharam	1976	S. Rajeswara Rao		Vani Jayaram
Ambai Eduthaan	Dasavatharam	1976	S. Rajeswara Rao		Vani Jayaram & K. J. Yesudas
Aasai Alaikalil Aadum	Kula Gouravam	1976	S. M. Subbaiah Naidu	Vaali	
Velai Vanthathadaa	Payanam	1976	M. S. Viswanathan	Kannadasan	T. M. Soundararajan
Aayiram Sumaigal	Gaslight Mangamma	1977	M. S. Viswanathan	Vaali	
Sugamaana Raagam	Madhurageetham	1977	Chandrabose	Kannadasan	T. M. Soundararajan
Varaverpu Varaverpu Vaa	Rowdy Rakkamma	1977	Shankar-Ganesh	Vaali	P. Susheela
Thitukoyil Katta Enni	Suprabadham	1977	M. S. Viswanathan	Kannadasan	Vani Jayaram
Enga Ooru Maariamma	Panchamirdham	1978	Shankar-Ganesh	Pulamaipithan	L. R. Anjali & Krishnamoorthy
Pollaadga Kaasu Vaali	Panchamirdham	1978	Shankar-Ganesh	Pulamaipithan	
Om Sakthi Om Sakthi	Sri Kanchi Kamakshi	1978	K. S. Raghunathan	A. Maruthakasi	T. L. Maharajan & S. C. Krishnan
Manmathan Kai Karumbin	Sri Kanchi Kamakshi	1978	K. S. Raghunathan		
Kannukku Nee Oru	Ullathil Kuzhanthaiyadi	1978	Shankar-Ganesh	A. Maruthakasi	Vani Jayaram
Vinnaagi Mannaagi.... Nalla Vaakku Sonaal	Vanakkatukuriya Kathaliye	1978	Shankar–Ganesh	Vaali	
Oorai Thiruttha Vaa	Vandikaran Magan	1978	M. S. Viswanathan	Vaali	Vani Jayaram & Kovai Soundarajan
Neeyindri Yaarumillai	Varuvan Vadivelan	1978	M. S. Viswanathan	Kannadasan	Vani Jayaram
Batthu Malai	Varuvan Vadivelan	1978	M. S. Viswanathan	Kannadasan	T. M. Soundararajan, M. S. Viswanathan, P. Susheela, L. R. Eswari & Bangalore A. R. Ramani Ammal
Aadum Naadhane Ambalavaanane	Gnana Kuzhandhai	1979	K. V. Mahadevan		
Avalidam Kelungal	Velli Ratham	1979	M. S. Viswanathan	A. L. Narayanan	
Aatharam Neeye Ganapathi	Velum Mayilum Thunai	1979	Shankar–Ganesh	Kannadasan	Bangalore A. R. Ramani Ammal

=== 1980s ===
Song	Movie	Year	Music	Lyrics	Co - Singer
Aalayam Endraal	Devi Dharisanam	1980	M. S. Viswanathan	Kannadasan	
Swami Thimthagathom	Saranam Ayyappa	1980	Chandrabose	Kannadasan	
Unakku Pani	Deiva Thirumanangal	1981	K. V. Mahadevan, M. S. Viswanathan & G. K. Venkatesh	Kannadasan	
Amma Un Karunaikku	Deviyin Thiruvilaiyadal	1982	M. S. Viswanathan	Vaali	Vani Jayaram
Thaaye Mookambikai	Thaai Mookaambikai	1982	Ilayaraaja	Vaali	M. Balamuralikrishna, M. S. Viswanathan & S. Janaki
Aashritha Valsalane	Mahabali	1983	M. K. Arjunan	Pappanamkodu Lakshmanan	
Skantha Sashti Viratham	Shasti Viratham	1983	Shankar–Ganesh	Vaali	P. Susheela
Yaar Purindha	Amma Irukka	1984	Shankar–Ganesh	Vaali	
Simma Soppanam	Simma Soppanam	1984	K. V. Mahadevan	Vaali	
Om Sakthi Om Sakthi	Mel Maruvathoor Athiparasakthi	1985	K. V. Mahadevan	Vaali	
Navagraha Naayagiye Karumaari	Navagraha Nayagi	1985	M. S. Viswanathan	Pulamaipithan	
Udhayathin Oli Thandhu	Navagraha Nayagi	1985	M. S. Viswanathan	K. R. Arivanantham	B. S. Sasirekha, Vani Jairam, T. M. Soundararajan, Rajkumar Bharathi & Kovai Kamala
Samapurathu Nayagiye	Samaya Purathale Satchi	1985	K. V. Mahadevan	Vaali	
Ore Thaai Ore Kulam	Mel Maruvathoor Arpudhangal	1986	K. V. Mahadevan	Vaali	
Swaamiye Saranam.... Aiyappan Kadhai	Nambinar Keduvathillai	1986	M. S. Viswanathan	Pulamaipithan	
Naanga Varom Sabari	Arul Tharum Ayyappan	1987	Dasarathan	Dasarathan	
Arivil Aathavan Naan	Mupperum Deviyar	1987	M. S. Viswanathan	Vaali	Vani Jayaram
Kaali Purapattaal	Mupperum Deviyar	1987	M. S. Viswanathan	Vaali	B. S. Sasirekha, Vani Jairam, T. M. Soundararajan
Karpagame Karpagame	Kai Koduppal Karpagambal	1988	Shankar–Ganesh	Vaali	
Singgaara Velanuku Arupadai Veedu	Murugane Thunai	1990	K. V. Mahadevan	Kulamagan	
