= List of Tamil films of 1956 =

Prior to the amendment of Tamil Nadu Entertainments Tax Act 1939 on 1 April 1958, Gross was 133.33 per cent of Nett for all films. Commercial Taxes Department disclosed ₹1.09 crore in entertainment tax revenue for the year.

The following is a list of films produced in the Tamil film industry in India in 1956, in alphabetical order.

== List of released films ==
Title	Director	Production	Music	Cast	Release date (D-M-Y)
Aasai	Natesan	Natesh Art Pictures	T. R. Pappa	Gemini Ganesan, Padmini, Rajasulochana, V. Nagayya, M. R. Santhanalakshmi, P. S. Veerappa, N. S. Krishnan, T. A. Madhuram	10-03-1956
Alibabavum 40 Thirudargalum	T. R. Sundaram	Modern Theatres	S. Dakshinamurthy	M. G. Ramachandran, P. Bhanumathi, P. S. Veerappa, K. A. Thangavelu, M. G. Chakrapani, M. N. Rajam, Vidhyavathi and Sai Subbulakshmi	14-01-1956
Amara Deepam	T. Prakash Rao	Venus Pictures	T. Chalapathi Rao & G. Ramanathan	Sivaji Ganesan, K. Savithri, Padmini, M. N. Nambiar, V. Nagayya, K. A. Thangavelu, E. V. Saroja, P. S. Vengadasalam	20-06-1956
Kaalam Mari Pochu	Tapi Chanakya	Sarathi Pictures	Master Venu	Gemini Ganesan, Anjali Devi, T. S. Balaiah, S. V. Subbaiah, M. S. Santhanalakshmi and dance by Waheeda Rehman	04-05-1956
Kannin Manigal	R. Janakiram	Maheswari Pictures	S. V. Venkatraman	M. K. Radha, Padmini, Sundar M.V. Rajamma, A. Karunanidhi, Jamuna	05-05-1956
Kokilavani	S. A. Natrajan	Forward Arts Films	G. Ramanathan	S. A. Natarajan, Tambaram Lalitha, Raghuveer, B. Saroja devi, P. Susheela	30-03-1956
Kudumba Vilakku	F. Nagoor	Nagoor Cine Productions	T. R. Pappa	P. V. Narasimha Bharathi, Jamuna, M. V. Rajamma, N. S. Krishnan, T. A. Madhuram, M. G. Chakrapani, T. S. Durairaj, K. A. Thangavelu, M. Lakshmikantham	14-06-1956
Kula Dheivam	Krishnan–Panju	S. K. Pictures	R. Sudarsanam	S. V. Sahasranamam, Pandari Bai, S. S. Rajendran, M. R. Santhanalakshmi, M. N. Rajam, J. P. Chandrababu, C. R. Vijayakumari, Kula Dheivam V. Rajagopal, Mynavathi	29-09-1956
Madurai Veeran	D. Yoganand	Krishna Pictures	G. Ramanathan	M. G. Ramachandran, P. Bhanumathi, Padmini, N. S. Krishnan, T. A. Madhuram, T. S. Balaiah, E. V. Saroja, O. A. K. Thevar, Sandow M. M. A. Chinnappa Thevar, T. K. Ramachandran, R. Balasubramaniam, M. R. Santhanalakshmi	13.04.1956
Mahakavi Kalidas; Dubbed from Kannada	K. R. Seetharama Sastry	Lalithakala Films Ltd	K. R. Seetharama Sastry	Honnappa Bhagavatar, B. Raghavendra Rao, Narasimharaju, B. Saroja Devi, Rajasulochana, B. K. Eshwarappa	
Mandhiravadhi	P. Subramaniam	Neela Productions	V. Dakshinamoorthy	Prem Nazir, Sreedharan, Kumari Thankam, Miss Kumari, Adoor Pankajam, Aranmula Ponnamma, Bahadoor, S. P. Pillai, T. S. Muthaiah, G. K. Pillai, Mavelikkara Ponnamma, Master Hari, Muttathara Soman	07-12-1956
Marma Veeran	T. R. Ragunath	Jubilee Arts Films	S. Vedha	Vyjayanthimala, Sriram, Rajasulochana, M. N. Rajam, V. Nagayya, T. S. Balaiah, J. P. Chandrababu, P. S. Veerappa, K. A. Thangavelu, T. K. Ramachandran, special appearance by N. T. Rama Rao, Sivaji Ganesan, Gemini Ganesan and dance by Helen	03-08-1956
Marumalarchi	K. S. Prakash Rao	Anandha Productions	S. Rajeswara Rao	Sriram, G. Varalakshmi	16-11-1956
Mathar Kula Manickam	T. Prakash Rao	Lalitha Films	S. Rajeswara Rao	Gemini Ganesan, A. Nageswara Rao, Anjali Devi, Savithri, P. Kannamba, K. Balaji, K. A. Thangavelu	20-12-1956
Moondru Pengal	R.S. Prakash	JayaSri Lakshmi Pictures	K. V. Mahadevan; Kunnakudi Venkatrama Iyer	R. S. Manohar, P. K. Saraswathi, Girija, T. S. Balaiah, S. A. Asokan, M. N. Rajam, T. S. Durairaj	12-02-1956
Naan Petra Selvam	K. Somu	Paragon Pictures	G. Ramanathan	Sivaji Ganesan, G. Varalakshmi, M. N. Nambiar, M. N. Rajam, K. Sarangapani, V. K. Ramasamy, A. Karunanidhi, T. P. Muthulakshmi, V. M. Ezhumalai, C. T. Rajakantham, P. D. Sambandham	14-01-1956
Naane Raja	Appa Rao; Narayanan	Kalpana Kala Mandir	T. R. Ramnathan	Sivaji Ganesan, Sriranjani, M. N. Rajam, T. S. Balaiah, S. V. Subbiah, S. V. Sahasranamam, V. Gopalakrishnan, M. K. Mustafa, N. S. Subbiah, J. P. Chandrababu, T. P. Muthulakshmi	25-01-1956
Naga Devathai	Chitrapu Narayana Murthy	AVM Productions	R. Sudarsanam	R. Nagendra Rao, Jamuna, Sowkar Janaki, Mohan	
Naga Panjami	K. Nagabushanam	Sri Raja Rajeswari Film & Co		Anjali Devi, S. Varalakshmi, V. Nagayya, K. A. Thangavelu	09-03-1956
Nalla Veedu	J. Sinha	Jai Sakthi Pictures	Krishnamurthi & Nagaraja Iyer	Sivaji Ganesan, M. N. Rajam, Pandari Bai	14-01-1956
Nannambikkai	K. Vembu Charlie	Film Center	S. V. Venkatraman	T. S. Balaiah, N. N. Kannappa, N. S. Krishnan, T. A. Madhuram, Pandari Bai, E. V. Saroja	31-08-1956
Ondre Kulam	N. Krishnaswamy	Triveni Pictures	M. Ranga Rao & S. V. Venkatraman	R.S. Manohar, Madhuri Devi, J. P. Chandrababu	20-04-1956
Paditha Penn	M. Thiruvenkadam	Shyamala Pictures, Nalini Pictures	Arun, Raghavan	N. N. Kannappa, M. N. Nambiar, Rajasulochana, Tambaram Lalitha	20-04-1956
Pasavalai	A. S. Nagarajan	Modern Theatres	Viswanathan–Ramamoorthy	M. K. Radha, G. Varalakshmi, M. N. Rajam, V. Gopalakrishnan, K. Thavamani Devi, V. K. Ramasamy, A. Karunanidhi	01-11-1956
Pennin Perumai	P. Pullaiah	Ragini Films	B. N. Rao, A. Rama Rao & Master Venu	Sivaji Ganesan, Gemini Ganesan, Savithri, M. N. Rajam, V. Nagayya, Santha Kumari, Friend Ramasamy, P. S. Gnanam, K. S. Angamuthu	17-02-1956
Prema Pasam	Vedantam Raghavayya	Narasu Studio	S. Rajeswara Rao	Gemini Ganesan, Savithri, K. Balaji, Girija, E. V. Saroja	21-05-1956
Punniyavathi	S. S. Rajan	Associated Productions	V. Dakshinamoorthy	Padmini, Sathyan, Kottarakkara Sreedharan Nair, Muthukulam Raghavan Pillai, S. P. Pillai, Baby Lalitha	1956
Raja Rani	A. Bhim Singh	National Pictures	T. R. Pappa	Sivaji Ganesan, Padmini, S. S. Rajendran, Rajasulochana, N. S. Krishnan, T. A. Madhuram, K. S. Angamuthu	25-02-1956
Rambaiyin Kaadhal	R. R. Chandran	Kalpana Kala Mandir	T. R. Pappa	P. Bhanumathi, M. N. Rajam, K. A. Thangavelu, M. N. Nambiar, T. S. Balaiah, S. V. Subbaiah, E. R. Sahadevan, Kaka Radhakrishnan, Sattampillai Venkatraman, M R. Saminathan, E. V. Saroja, Ambika, C. K. Saraswathi, T. P. Muthulakshmi, Saradhambal	28-09-1956
Rangoon Radha	A. Kasilingam	Mekala Pictures	T. R. Pappa	Sivaji Ganesan, P. Bhanumathi, S. S. Rajendran, M. N. Rajam, Rajasulochana, N. S. Krishnan, T. A. Madhuram, R. Muthuraman	01-11-1956
Sadhaaram	V. C. Subburaman	Kasturi Films	G. Ramanathan	Gemini Ganesan, P. Bhanumathi, K. R. Ramasamy, M. N. Rajam, K. Sarangapani, V. K. Ramasamy, M. S. S. Bakkiam	13-04-1956
Tenali Raman	B. S. Ranga	Vikram Production	Viswanathan–Ramamoorthy	Sivaji Ganesan, N. T. Rama Rao, P. Bhanumathi, Jamuna, V. Nagayya, Sandhya, M. N. Nambiar	03-02-1956
Thaikkupin Tharam	M. A. Thirumugam	Devar Films	K. V. Mahadevan	M. G. Ramachandran, P. Bhanumathi, P. Kannamba, T. S. Balaiah, Kaka Radhakrishnan, E. R. Sahadevan, G. Sakunthala, K. Rathinam, Surabhi Balasaraswathi	21-09-1956
Vazhvile Oru Naal	A. Kasilingam	Mercury Pictures	S. M. Subbaiah Naidu, C. N. Pandurangan & T. G. Lingappa	Sivaji Ganesan, G. Varalakshmi, Sriram (actor)|Sriram, Rajasulochana, V. K. Ramasamy	21-09-1956
Verum Pechu Alla	Joseph Pallippad	Principle Productions	C. N. Pandurangan	T. S. Balaiah, Padmini	18-05-1956
Vetri Veeran	T. Prakash Rao		T. M. Ibrahim (for Tamil version)	N. T. Rama Rao, Anjali Devi, Sowkar Janaki, C. S. R. Anjaneyulu	

== Dubbed films ==
Title	Director(s)	Company	Composer	Original film		Cast
Title	Director(s)	Company	Composer	Title	Language	Cast
Amara Geetham	Vedantam Raghavayya	Vinoda Pictures	Ghantasala	Chiranjeevulu	Telugu	N. T. Rama Rao, Jamuna, Gummadi, Peketi Sivaram, C. S. R. Anjaneyulu, Suryakantam, Chhaya Devi, Surabhi Balasaraswati, Mahankali Venkayya
Bale Raman	P. S. Ramakrishna Rao	Bhaskar Productions	T. A. Kalyanam	Bratuku Teruvu	Telugu	A. Nageswara Rao, Sriranjani, K. Savithri, S. V. Ranga Rao, Suryakantam, Relangi
C. I. D.	M. Krishnan Nair	Neela Productions	Br Lakshmanan	C.I.D	Malayalam	Prem Nazir, Miss Kumari, Kottarakkara, Kumari Thankam
Edhu Nijam	S. Balachander	Prathiba Films	Master Venu	Edi Nijam	Telugu	Sowcar Janaki, Nagabhushanam, Gummadi, Ramana Reddy
Illarame Inbam	Kovelamudi Bhaskar Rao	Bhaskar Productions	Ghantasala	Cherapakura Chedevu	Telugu	N. T. Rama Rao, Sowcar Janaki, Relangi, Rajasulochana
Mahakavi Kalidas	K. R. Seetharama Sastry	Lalithakala Films	K. R. Seetharama Sastry	Mahakavi Kalidasa	Kannada	Honnappa Bhagavatar, B. Raghavendra Rao, Narasimharaju, B. Saroja Devi
Mangala Gowri	D. Yoganand	Mahi Productions	Ogirala Ramachandra Rao, T. V. Raju	Sri Gauri Mahatyam	Telugu	N. T. Rama Rao, Sriranjani, Jr.
Maya Mohini	Homi Wadia	Basant Pictures	S. N. Tripathi	Hatim Tai	Hindi	P. Jairaj, Shakila, Krishna Kumari, W. M. Khan, S. N. Tripathi, B. M. Vyas, Meenakshi, Sheikh, Vasantrao Pahlwan, Dalpat, Sardar Mansoor, Habib, Mithoo Miya, Aga Shapoor
Santhanam	C. V. Ranganatha Dasu		Susarla Dakshinamurthi	Santhanam	Telugu	Akkineni Nageswara Rao, Savitri, S. V. Ranga Rao, Chalam, Amarnath (actor)|Amarnath, Relangi, Ramana Reddy, Mikkilineni, Chadalavada, Allu Ramalingaiah, Padmanabham, Sriranjani, Jr., Kusuma Kumari, Hemalatha
Sivasakthi	P. Neelakantan	Padmini Pictures	T. G. Lingappa	Shivasharane Nambekka	Kannada	B. R. Panthulu, M. V. Rajamma
Thiruttu Raman	K. V. Reddy	Annapurna Pictures	Pendyala Nageshwara Rao	Donga Ramudu	Telugu	Akkineni Nageswara Rao, Savitri, Jamuna, Jaggayya
Vanaratham	S. U. Sunny	Sunny Art Productions	Naushad	Uran Khatola	Hindi	Dilip Kumar, Nimmi, Jeevan, Tun Tun, Agha
Vetri Veeran	T. Prakash Rao	Rajasri Productions	T. M. Ibrahim	Jayam Manade	Telugu	N. T. Rama Rao, Anjali Devi, Sowkar Janaki, C. S. R. Anjaneyulu
