= Kuravanji =

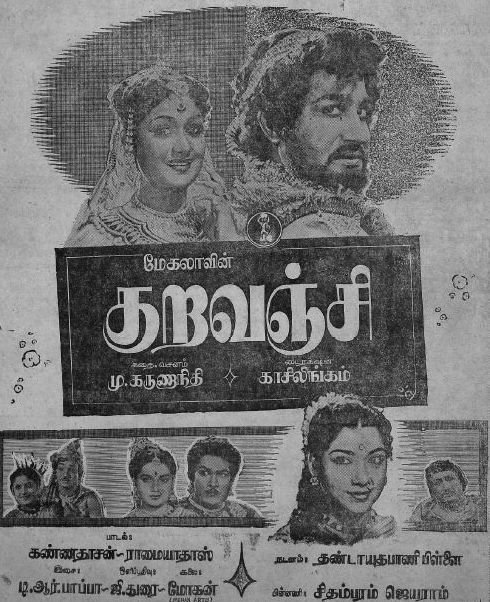
- Poster
- Directed by: A. Kasilingam
- Written by: M. Karunanidhi
- Produced by: M. Karunanidhi; R. M. Veerappan; A. Kasilingam
- Starring: Sivaji Ganesan; Savitri
- Cinematography: G. Durai
- Edited by: A. Kasilingam
- Music by: T. R. Pappa
- Production company: Mekala Pictures
- Release date: 4 March 1960
- Country: India
- Language: Tamil

Kuravanji is a 1960 Indian Tamil language film directed by A. Kasilingam. The film stars Sivaji Ganesan and Savitri, and was produced by M. Karunanidhi, R. M. Veerappan, and A. Kasilingam. Released on 4 March 1960, it was not a commercial success.

== Plot ==
The film tells the story of Thenpandiko, the king of Inbapuri. The king appoints his brother, Mukhari, to rule Ellaipuram, which is a part of the kingdom. Mukhari has a minister, Imaya, who has evil designs. Mukhari falls prey to his evil plans, and besides taking over Ellaipuram, he plans to usurp Inbapuri from his brother. To help the suffering people enters a man named Kadhiravan, hailing from the royal family. He moves around the kingdom in the guise of a vagabond. Princess Kumari wishes to marry him, while he falls in love with Ponni, who is from the fisherfolk community. Coming to know of this, Kadhiravan's brother is furious. The princess is equally upset, but Kadhiravan is more interested in saving the people. Soon there is a protest led by him that gains momentum. What happens to it is narrated in the latter half of the film.

== Cast ==
Male cast

- Sivaji Ganesan as Kathiravan
- O. A. K. Thevar
- R. Balasubramaniam
- M. N. Krishnan
- M. R. Santhanam as Kathiravan's Father
- N. S. Natarajan
- S. V. Ramadas
- Karuppaiah
- Senthamarai
- Jayaraman
- Kuladeivam Rajgopal
- Wahab Kashmiri
- S. R. Gopal
- T. K. Sampangi
- Karikol Raj
- Krishnamurthi
- Rajamohan
- S. A. G. Sami

Female cast

- Savithri as Kuravanji, Kumari
- Mynavathi as Ponni
- Pandari Bai
- Susheela
- Radhabhai as Kathiravan's mother
- C. K. Saraswathi
- Vanaja (Guest Artist)
- Sampathkumari
- Indra

Dance

- Padmini Priyadarshini
- Vijayalakshmi
- Lakshmirajam

== Production ==
S. S. Rajendran was initially to play the lead role in Kuravanji. However, due to some "friction" between him and M. Karunanidhi, the role was later offered to Sivaji Ganesan. He was hesitant to accept as he believed Rajendran would misunderstand him if he accepted, but after being reassured by Karunanidhi, Ganesan accepted the offer out of respect. Kuravanji is Ganesan's 60th film as an actor. During the shoot, Ganesan chose to wear a gunny sack instead of the woollen clothes that were given to him. He wanted to "connect with the reality of the character of a tribesman". Rajasulochana had been offered to act in the film but declined.

== Soundtrack ==
The music was composed by T. R. Pappa.

Song	Singers	Lyrics	Length
"Kaadhal Pollathadhu"	P. Susheela	Thanjai N. Ramaiah Dass	03:06
"Sengkayil Vandu Kalin" "Thannamudhudan Pirandhhai" "Sollakelaai Kuri Sollakelaai" "Irunda Megam Sutri"	C. S. Jayaraman & Ramaiya; P. Leela; A. P. Komala & A. G. Rathnamala; C. S. Jayaraman	Thirikooda Rasappa Kavirayar	02:20; 02:21; 01:05; 00:48
"Ennaalum Thanniyile"	A. L. Raghavan & Jikki	Thanjai N. Ramaiah Dass	03.27
"Thanneril Meen Irukum.... Unakku Puriyudhu"	C. S. Jayaraman & P. Leela	Kannadasan	05:17
"Athaachi Naazhi Pathaachi"	A. L. Raghavan & M. S. Rajeswari	Thanjai N. Ramaiah Dass	
"Kaadhal Kadal Karaiyorame"	C. S. Jayaraman, P. Leela & P. Susheela	Kannadasan	03:53
"Paadi Azhaippen Endru"	C. S. Jayaraman	Kannadasan	03:23
"Nee Sollavidil Yaar Solluvar Nilavae"	C. S. Jayaraman	Kudanthai R. Krishnamurthi	03:30
"Alai Irukkuthu Kadalile"	K. Jamuna Rani	M. Karunanidhi	03:12
"Alaiyitta Karumbaaka"	C. S. Jayaraman	Kannadasan	01:07
"Onne Onnu Irukku"	Jikki		03:16

== Reception ==
Kanthan of Kalki noted that the film's lengthy runtime was not a detriment to it being an entertainer.

== Bibliography ==
- Ganesan, Sivaji; Narayana Swamy, T. S. (2007) [2002]. Autobiography of an Actor: Sivaji Ganesan, October 1928 – July 2001. Sivaji Prabhu Charities Trust. OCLC 297212002.
