= Maappillai (1952 film) =

1952 film by T. R. Raghunath

- Theatrical release poster
- Directed by: T. R. Raghunath
- Written by: V. N. Sambandam
- Starring: T. R. Ramachandran; P. K. Saraswathi; T. K. Ramachandran
- Cinematography: P. S. Selvaraj
- Edited by: S. A. Murugesan
- Music by: T. R. Pappa; N. S. Balakrishnan
- Production company: National Productions
- Release date: 7 November 1952
- Running time: 196 minutes
- Country: India
- Language: Tamil

Maappillai (transl. Son-in-law) is a 1952 Indian Tamil-language drama film directed by T. R. Raghunath and written by V. N. Sambandam. The film stars T. R. Ramachandran, P. K. Saraswathi and T. K. Ramachandran. The film was released on 7 November 1952 and became a success.

== Plot ==
Maappillai is the rags-to-riches story of an office boy, and the attempts by his boss's son to destroy him and usurp his wealth.

== Cast ==
- T. R. Ramachandran as the office boy
- P. K. Saraswathi as Nalini
- T. K. Ramachandran as the printing-press head's son
- P. V. Narasimha Bharathi as Kumar
- Kaka Radhakrishnan as the doctor
- M. N. Rajam as the nurse
- R. Balasubramaniam as the printing-press head

== Production ==
Maappillai was directed by T. R. Raghunath, written by V. N. Sambandam and produced by National Productions. Cinematography was handled by P. S. Selvaraj, and editing by S. A. Murugesan. The film was shot and processed at Newton Studios. Its final length was 17,647 feet (5,379 m).

== Soundtrack ==
The soundtrack was composed by T. R. Pappa and N. S. Balakrishnan, while the lyrics were written by Thanjai N. Ramaiah Dass. The song "Dosu Kodukka Venum", picturised on Radhakrishnan and Rajam, satirises "men, mores and morals", and attained popularity.

Song	Singer/s	Music	Duration
"Kadhalil Vinghanam"	A. M. Rajah & P. Leela	T. R. Pappa	03:04
"All Right.... Naanoru Ragasiyam"	A. G. Rathnamala	T. R. Pappa	02:39
"Dosu Kodukka Venum"	Thiruchi Loganathan & A. G. Rathnamala	N. S. Balakrishnan	03:21
"Kannum Karutha Kudumbam"	P. Leela	N. S. Balakrishnan	03:13
"Mayangadhe Madhi"	A. P. Komala	N. S. Balakrishnan	03:43
"Sirandha Ulaginile"	P. Leela & Soolamangalam Jayalakshmi	N. S. Balakrishnan	06:24
"Raja Kudumbatthil"	Thiruchi Loganathan & A. G. Rathnamala	N. S. Balakrishnan	02:31
"Inbame Siridhum Ariyaadha"	P. Leela	N. S. Balakrishnan	01:10
"Kanneerthaan.... Pennaaga Pirandhaal"	P. Leela	N. S. Balakrishnan	03:03

== Release and reception ==
Maappillai was released on 7 November 1952. The film initially faced a poor commercial performance; in response, the makers bought the rights to a short film advertising a circus and added it to screenings. This attracted more audiences, and the film became a commercial success.
