= Avasara Kalyanam =

- Poster
- Directed by: V. T. Thyagarajan
- Written by: Balamurugan
- Starring: Jaishankar; Nagesh; Vanisri; Rama Prabha
- Cinematography: Pachchu
- Edited by: K. Sangunni
- Music by: T. R. Pappa
- Production company: Subalakshmi Movies
- Release date: 29 June 1972
- Running time: 140 minutes
- Country: India
- Language: Tamil

Avasara Kalyanam (transl. Urgent Marriage) is a 1972 Indian Tamil-language comedy film, directed by V. T. Thyagarajan and produced by Subalakshmi Movies. The film's script was written by Bala Murugan. The film stars Jaishankar and Nagesh playing lead roles, with Vanisri, Rama Prabha and V. K. Ramasamy in supporting roles. It was released on 29 June 1972. The film was shot in black and white. Jaishankar, who played the protagonist Sekar, was one of the most prolific Tamil action and comedy film actors of the early 1970s and frequently collaborated with comedian Nagesh, who plays Raghu in the film. Vanisri, cast as Advocate Vasanthi, was a leading Tamil and Telugu actress of the period known for her work in both comedies and dramatic films. Kannadasan, one of the most celebrated Tamil lyricists of the 20th century, wrote the lyrics for the film’s songs.

== Plot ==
Friends Sekar and Ramu come to Madras for employment but their money is looted. Ramu cheats a rich girl by acting as rich and marries her. Sekar tells the truth to Ramu's wife and Ramu becomes an enemy to Sekar. Ramu separates Sekar and his lover. How the pairs are reunited is the story.

== Cast ==
- Jaishankar as Sekar
- Nagesh as Raghu
- Vanisri as Advocate Vasanthi
- Rama Prabha as Kamala
- V. K. Ramasamy as Ranganathan
- S. Rama Rao as Street Thief
- M. R. R. Vasu as Robbery Gang leader
- I. S. R. as Kamla's Manager
- Vijayachandrika as Meena
- Kathadi Ramamurthy as Vasanthi's admirer
- A. Veerappan in Cameo Appearance
- V. R. Thilagam in Cameo Appearance

== Soundtrack ==
Music was composed by T. R. Pappa and lyrics were written by Kannadasan.

Song	Singer	Length
"Kathirundhen Mama Kaividalama"	L. R. Eswari	
"Vennila Nerathile"	P. Susheela	3:01
"Paarthal Murugan"	T. M. Soundararajan, P. Suseela	3:39
"Seitha Paavam" (Siva Guru Natha)	T. M. Soundararajan	1:43
