= Cherapakura Chedevu =

- Theatrical release poster
- Directed by: Kovelamudi Bhaskar Rao
- Written by: Samudrala Jr (dialogues)
- Produced by: Kovelamudi Bhaskar Rao
- Starring: N. T. Rama Rao; Sowcar Janaki
- Cinematography: Kamal Ghosh
- Edited by: M. V. Rajan
- Music by: Ghantasala
- Production company: Bhaskar Productions
- Release date: 6 July 1955
- Running time: 132 minutes
- Country: India
- Language: Telugu

Cherapakura Chedevu (transl. If You try to Spoil Anyone You Only will get Spoiled) is a 1955 Indian Telugu-language drama film, produced and directed by Kovelamudi Bhaskar Rao under the Bhaskar Productions banner. The film stars N. T. Rama Rao and Sowcar Janaki with music composed by Ghantasala. It was dubbed in Tamil and released as Illarame Inbam in 1956.

== Cast ==
- N. T. Rama Rao as Mohan
- Sowkar Janaki as Lalitha
- Relangi as Pitambaram
- R. Nageswara Rao as Dayanidhi
- Amarnath as Anand
- Doraiswamy as Gangadharam
- Ravulapalli as Govind Rao
- Suryakantham as Menaka's mother
- Allu Ramalingaiah as Ayurvedam Doctor
- Lakshmi Rajyam as Shanta
- Rajasulochana as Menaka
- Chandra Kumari as Seeta
- Pushpalatha as Savitri

== Soundtrack ==
Music composed by Ghantasala. Music released by His Master's Voice. All the tunes for all the songs for both languages are the same.

Playback singers are Ghantasala, P. Leela, Jikki & K. Rani.

Song title	Singers	Lyrics	length
"Aapakuraa Murali"	P. Leela	Samudrala Jr	02:57
"Prema Prema Prema"	Ghantasala & K. Rani	Ravuri	04:54
"Aadi Vinnara"	Jikki	Ravuri	
"Yogamu Anuragamu"	P. Leela	Ravuri	02:54
"Andala Naa Raja"	Jikki	Samudrala Jr.	
"Gulabithota"	Jikki	Samudrala Jr.	03:10
"Illuvidichi"	Ghantasala	Ravuri	02:39
"Naatakam Aadudam"	Ghantasala & K. Rani	Ravuri	03:07
"Paadindi Paata"	Ghantasala	Ravuri	

Tamil songs

Lyrics were by Thanjai N. Ramaiah Dass. Playback singers are Seerkazhi Govindarajan, P. Leela, Jikki & K. Rani.

Song title	Singers	length
"Naan Maraven Murali"	P. Leela	02:57
"Prema Prema Prema"	Seerkazhi Govindarajan & K. Rani	04:54
"Adhu Vendam Idhu Vendam"	Jikki	02:10
"Yogamum Anuraagamum"	P. Leela	02:54
"Kannaana En Raajaa"	Jikki	03:08
"Ulaavudhe Joraai"	Jikki	03:25
"Malai Asaindhaalum Neeye"	Seerkazhi Govindarajan	02:39
"Per Vanthidudhaa"	Seerkazhi Govindarajan & K. Rani	03:07
""	Seerkazhi Govindarajan	
