= Rambaiyin Kaadhal (1956 film) =

- Theatrical release poster
- Directed by: R. R. Chandran
- Screenplay by: P. Raghu; R. R. Chandran; K. Narayanan
- Produced by: R. R. Chandran
- Starring: P. Bhanumathi; K. A. Thangavelu; M. N. Rajam
- Cinematography: R. R. Chandran
- Edited by: J. B. Raj
- Music by: T. R. Pappa
- Production company: Kalpana Kala Mandhir
- Release date: 28 September 1956
- Running time: 137 minutes
- Country: India
- Language: Tamil

Rambaiyin Kaadhal (transl. Rambha's Love) is a 1956 Indian Tamil-language Hindu mythological film starring P. Bhanumathi, K. A. Thangavelu and M. N. Rajam. A remake of the 1939 film of the same name, it was released on 28 September 1956.

== Plot ==
On one of her sojourns to the earth, the celestial nymph Rambha is struck by the serene, picturesque beauty of an obscure spot. Tired of the ostentatious splendour of the Indra's court, she is filled with a quiet rapture at discovering the idyllic, rustic charm of this earthly setting. So entranced is she by the place that she is late for her usual dance recital in the hall of the King of Gods. When Indra learns the reason for her belated arrival, he flies into a rage and curses Rambha to be transformed into a statue during the day in the very place that had so transfixed her.

In that hamlet, there lived a young simpleton who was always the target of everyone's taunts and tricks. A group of mischief mongers lead him blindfolded to the statue and performing a sham ceremony, declare that the statue is his wife. Rambha too falls in love with her gullible husband. The events that follow range from hilarious to moving and heartwarming.

== Cast ==
- P. Bhanumathi as Rambha
- Thangavelu as Muthazhagu
- T. S. Balaiah as Yama
- M. N. Nambiar as Narada
- S. V. Subbaiah as the king
- M. N. Rajam as Princess Suguna
- E. V. Saroja as Urvashi
- Ambika as Menaka
- T. P. Muthulakshmi as Oyyari
- C. K. Saraswathi as Panchavarnam
- Saradhambal as Kamakshi
- E. R. Sahadevan as Indra
- Kaka Radhakrishnan as Kailasam
- Sattampillai Venkatraman as Vaikundam
- Ashokan as the Minister

== Soundtrack ==
The music was composed by T. R. Pappa.

Song	Singers	Lyrics	Length
"Kattivellam Neeye Katterumbu Naane"	K. H. Reddy & A. G. Rathnamala	A. Maruthakasi	
"Kalaignanam Uravaadum Naadu"	P. Leela & N. L. Ganasaraswathi	A. Maruthakasi	04:34
"Podu Dakku Mukku Dakku Thaalam"	S. C. Krishnan & Jikki	A. Maruthakasi	02:22
"Samarasam Ulaavum Idame"	Seerkazhi Govindarajan	A. Maruthakasi	04:32
"Bagavaane Mounam Eno"	Seerkazhi Govindarajan	A. Maruthakasi	03:09
"Bakthar Potrum Badhrachchalane Naaraayanaa"	Seerkazhi Govindarajan	Thanjai N. Ramaiah Dass	05:02
"Kannu Therinju Nadakkanum"	T. M. Soundararajan, S. V. Ponnusamy & Ramaiah	Thanjai N. Ramaiah Dass	02:43
"Aadavaareer Indre Aadavaareer"	P. Bhanumathi	Thanjai N. Ramaiah Dass	03:41
"Kannaalaa Vaazhvile Kaadhal Poidhaana"	P. Bhanumathi	Thanjai N. Ramaiah Dass	03:16
"Saanjaa Saayara Pakkame Saayara Semmari Aadugalaa"	T. M. Soundararajan	Thanjai N. Ramaiah Dass	03:04
"Kannaalaa Vaazhvile Kaadhal Poidhaana"	P. Bhanumathi & P. Suseela	Thanjai N. Ramaiah Dass	03:51
"Kattumasthu Kalaiyaadha Kattazhagi...Katthiri Saadham"	P. Leela	Thanjai N. Ramaiah Dass	03:23
"Aalamara Muniyaandi...Sanggili Karuppano"	S. V. Ponnusamy	Thanjai N. Ramaiah Dass	02:22

== Reception ==
The Indian Express wrote, "Bhanumathi, still in her prime as an actress, fills remarkably the role of Ramba. Muthulakshmi, the budding starlet, shows real promise. But Nambiar makes a mockery of Narada". Kanthan of Kalki appreciated the direction, writing and music.
