= Ammaiyappan (film) =

1954 film by A. Bhimsingh

- Poster
- Directed by: A. Bhimsingh
- Written by: M. Karunanidhi
- Produced by: Dinshaw K. Tehrani; Jithan Banerjee
- Starring: S. S. Rajendran; S. Varalakshmi; G. Sakunthala
- Cinematography: G. Vittal Rao
- Edited by: A. Bhimsingh
- Music by: T. R. Pappa
- Production company: National Pictures
- Release date: 24 September 1954
- Country: India
- Language: Tamil

Ammaiyappan is a 1954 Indian Tamil-language film written by M. Karunanidhi and directed by A. Bhimsingh in his directorial debut. The film stars S. S. Rajendran, G. Sakunthala and S. Varalakshmi. It was released on 24 September 1954 and became a major breakthrough in the career of Bhimsingh.

== Cast ==
Cast according to the song book

Male cast

- S. S. Rajendran as Muthan
- D. V. Narayanaswami as Velaizhagan
- D. Balasubramaniam as Balathevar
- V. K. Ramasami as Maigai Nada Swamigal
- M. R. Saminathan as Ghost
- M. N. Krishnan as Sukhadev
- M. A. Ganapathi as Thirusangu
- K. A. Ramakrishnan as Bhoopathi
- P. S. Dakshinamoorthi as Prankster
- E. Krishnamoorthi as Businessman
- Master Muthumanikkam as Businessman's Child

Female cast

- S. Varalakshmi as Poongavanam
- G. Sakunthala as Muthayi
- K. Rathnam as Sumathi
- Saraswathi as Rani

Male support cast

- N. S. Nagarajan, Stunt Krishnan,
  P. A. Dakshinamoorthi, and Nagoor Hanifa.

== Production ==
Ammaiyappan marked the directorial debut of A. Bhimsingh. It was produced by National Pictures, written by M. Karunanidhi, and featured S. S. Rajendran as the male lead, with G. Sakunthala as his love interest. Shooting took place at the studios Newtone and Citadel in Chennai (then known as Madras). Cinematography was handled by G. Vittal Rao.

== Music ==
The music of the film was composed by T. R. Pappa, with lyrics by Karunanidhi, Suratha, M. K. Athmanathan and N. M. Muthukuttan.

Song	Singer/s
"Ammaiyappaa Arul Puruvaai"	
"Kaadhal Thuraiye Pudhumai Kanave"	M. L. Vasanthakumari &
"Kaadhal Puraa Kaadhile"	S. Varalakshmi
"Chinna Pudhu Malare"	M. L. Vasanthakumari
"Sidhaindhadhe.... Manamogana Jeevan"	S. Varalakshmi & M. L. Vasanthakumari
"Poojaikku.... Pillaiyaare Thulli"	M. L. Vasanthakumari
"Neelakadal Paaru Paappaa"	M. L. Vasanthakumari
"Kaadhal Thuraiye Pudhumai Kanave"	M. L. Vasanthakumari

== Reception ==
Ammaiyappan was released on 24 September 1954. The film became a breakthrough in the career of Bhimsingh. Writing for The Hindu, historian Randor Guy noted that the film is remembered for "alliterative Tamil dialogue" by Karunanidhi, and the performance of Rajendran.
