= Nallavan Vazhvan =

- Theatrical release poster
- Directed by: P. Neelakantan
- Screenplay by: C. N. Annadurai
- Story by: Na. Pandurangan
- Produced by: P. Neelakantan
- Starring: M. G. Ramachandran; Rajasulochana
- Cinematography: G. Durai
- Music by: T. R. Pappa
- Production company: Arasu Pictures
- Release date: 31 August 1961
- Country: India
- Language: Tamil

Nallavan Vazhvan (transl. The good man will live) is a 1961 Indian Tamil-language crime thriller film produced and directed by P. Neelakantan. The film stars M. G. Ramachandran and Rajasulochana. It revolves around a man who is sentenced to death on false charges, and escapes from prison to clear his name.

Nallavan Vazhvan is the 50th film for Ramachandran as an actor. The screenplay was written by C. N. Annadurai, from a story by Na. Pandurangan, and cinematography was handled by G. Durai. The film was released on 31 August 1961 and underperformed at the box office, with a theatrical run of 80 days.

== Plot ==
Muthu, a convict sentenced to death on false charges of murder, escapes from prison. He will have to himself confuse the culprit, Nallasivam, the local personality, of the most well-to-do, above suspicion, a priori. During his escape, disguised as a shaman, Muthu leads an investigation, and finds that the matter rests on the indestructible support of some women. First of all, his young and beautiful Chandra (that he saved formerly, captivated in the hands of Nallasivam), of its mother and the one that he considers as his young sister Chenbagame. But the husband of the latter, the inspector of police, in charge of this case, Madhavan, friend, nevertheless, Muthu, convinced of his guilt, does not stop pursuing him. However, the hired men thrown by Nallasivam cross the region in search of the fugitive to kill him. In front of such threats, will Muthu manage to put, in time, the hand on the unique witness which could exonerate him?

== Cast ==
Male cast

- M. G. Ramachandran as Muthu
- M. R. Radha as Nallasivam
- M. N. Nambiar as Inspector Madhavan
- D. Balasubramaniam as Nallasivam's clerk
- S. Rama Rao as Makeup Meganathan

Female cast

- Rajasulochana as Chandra
- E. V. Saroja as Chenbagame
- Lakshmi Prabha as Muthu's mother
- P. S. Seethalaksmi as the witness

== Production ==
Nallavan Vazhvan was produced and directed by P. Neelakantan under Arasu Pictures. The screenplay was written by C. N. Annadurai, from a story by Na. Pandurangan. It was the 50th film for M. G. Ramachandran as an actor. Cinematography was handled by G. Durai.

== Soundtrack ==
The soundtrack was composed by T. R. Pappa. This was the first Ramachandran film for which Vaali wrote lyrics. The team initially rejected the lyrics Vaali wrote for the song "Sirikindraal Indru Sirikindraal" and wanted A. Maruthakasi to write new lyrics, but Maruthakasi convinced the team to retain Vaali's lyrics. The song contains the lyrics "Udayasooriyan ethiril irundhal, ullai thamarai malaratho" (in front of the rising sun, the lotus of one's heart blooms), where the "rising sun" is a reference to the Dravida Munnetra Kazhagam's election symbol.

Song	Singers	Lyrics	Length
"Aandavan Oruvan Irukkindraan"	Seerkazhi Govindarajan	M. K. Athmanathan	03:22
"Adichirukku Nallathoru Chansu"	A. L. Raghavan & S. Janaki	M. K. Athmanathan	02:59
"Kooduvittu Paranthakili"	P. Susheela	M. K. Athmanathan	02:51
"Anbukkaratthale....Kuthala Aruviyile"	Seerkazhi Govindarajan & P. Leela	Vaali	03:27
"Manniley Pon Kidaikkum"	P. Susheela	A. Maruthakasi	02:57
"Nallavarukke Kaalamillaiya"	P. Leela	K. D. Santhanam	03:39
"Niththam Niththam Manadhu"	P. Susheela	Kavi Rajagopal	01:35
"Sirikindraal Indru Sirikindraal"	Seerkazhi Govindarajan & P. Susheela	Vaali	03:26

== Release and reception ==
Nallavan Vazhvan was released on 31 August 1961. Kanthan of Kalki negatively reviewed the film, saying one redeeming feature was its short runtime of 15,133 feet (4,613 m). The film underperformed at the box office and ran for 80 days in theatres.
