= Aasai (1956 film) =

- Theatrical release poster
- Directed by: M. Natesan
- Story by: M. Natesan
- Produced by: M. Natesan
- Starring: Gemini Ganesan; Padmini
- Cinematography: R. Sambanth
- Edited by: S. A. Murugesan
- Music by: T. R. Pappa
- Production company: Natesh Art Productions
- Release date: 10 March 1956
- Country: India
- Language: Tamil

Aasai (transl. Desire) is a 1956 Indian Tamil-language film, produced and directed by M. Natesan, who also wrote the story. The dialogues were written by Ilangovan, K. V. Gnanasambantham and Ve. Laxmanan. The film stars Gemini Ganesan and Padmini.

== Cast ==
Male cast

- Gemini Ganesan as Sekhar
- N. S. Krishnan as Jakkan
- V. Nagayya as Sadhanandham
- D. Balasubramaniam as Nithyanandham
- P. S. Veerappa as Veeran
- Thirupathisami as Singaram
- Sethupathi as Masi
- V. P. Balaraman (party) as Stunts
- Krishnan as Stunts

Female cast

- Padmini as Sundari
- Rajam Sulochana as Valli
- T. A. Mathuram as Chokki
- P. Santha Kumari as Amrtham
- M. R. Santhanalakshmi as Anjuham
- T. S. Jaya as Kathayi
- Baby Parvathi as Selvi
- Rita, Shantha, Saraswathi

== Soundtrack ==
Music was by T. R. Pappa.

Song	Singer	Lyrics	Length
"Vaazhvelam Inbam Tharum"	Jikki		03:54
"Dakkidi Dakkidi Dakkidi Naalu Kaal Kuthirai"	N. S. Krishnan	Udumalai Narayana Kavi	03:15
"Aasai Pongum Azhagu Roobam"	A. M. Rajah & Jikki		03:28
"Thiruthandavam Seiyum Sivame Thunai"	V. Nagayya		03:09
"Aasai Anbellam"	K. Jamuna Rani	Udumalai Narayana Kavi	03:20
"Kanni Thamizhil....Oviyanin Ullam Thannai"	A. M. Rajah & T. V. Rathnam		03:26
"Kalai Gnaana Jothiyae.... Thunai Yaarum Ilaadha"	Jikki	Udumalai Narayana Kavi	03:15
"Valaiyal Ammaa Valaiyal"	A. M. Rajah & N. S. Krishnan		03:29
"Aadi Paadi Odi Varum"	P. Leela & T. V. Rathnam		02:09
"Varum Kaalam Nalla Kaalam"	A. M. Rajah & Jikki		02:32
"Kallinaal.... Yaarai Paarthu Enna"	T. V. Rathnam		05:06
"Vaanil Kannum Nilaave"	A. M. Rajah & Jikki		03:21

== Reception ==
Kalki wrote.
