= Magane Nee Vazhga =

- VCD cover
- Directed by: M. Krishnan
- Written by: Balamurugan
- Produced by: R. Lakshmanan
- Starring: Jaishankar; Lakshmi
- Cinematography: T. M. Chandrababu
- Edited by: K. Narayanan; K. Sangunni
- Music by: T. R. Pappa
- Production company: Subhalakshmi Movies
- Release date: 25 July 1969
- Country: India
- Language: Tamil

Magane Nee Vazhga (Tamil pronunciation: [maɡan̪eː n̪iː ʋaːɻɡa] transl. Son, may you live long) is a 1969 Indian Tamil-language drama film directed by M. Krishnan and written by Balamurugan. The film stars Jaishankar and Lakshmi, with Major Sundarrajan, Anjali Devi, V. S. Raghavan and C. R. Vijayakumari in supporting roles. It was released on 25 July 1969.

== Cast ==
- Jaishankar
- Lakshmi
- Major Sundarrajan
- Anjali Devi
- V. S. Raghavan
- C. R. Vijayakumari

== Production ==
The film was produced by R. Lakshmanan of Subhalakshmi Movies, photographed by T. M. Chandrababu and edited by K. Narayanan and K. Sangunni.

== Soundtrack ==
The music was composed by T. R. Pappa, with lyrics by Kannadasan.

Track listing
No.	Title	Singer(s)	Length
1.	"Azhagumayil"	Sirkazhi Govindarajan, P. Susheela	6:27
2.	"Otha Kallu Mookuthi"	T. M. Soundararajan, P. Susheela	3:32
3.	"Ethanai Mugamo Unakku"	P. Susheela	3:15
Total length:			13:14

== Release and reception ==
Magane Nee Vazhga was released on 25 July 1969. The Indian Express wrote the film "is an example of how a good story can be spoiled by over telling it. The real trouble with the film is the weak and inept screenplay and equally trite direction". The reviewer also felt Jaishankar, Sundarrajan and Anjali Devi were wasted, and that Raghavan and Vijayakumari saved the film from ruin despite appearing briefly.
