= T. R. Pappa =

Indian composer

Background information
- Born: Sivasankaran; 3 July 1922
- Origin: Thiruthuraipoondi, Madras Presidency, British India
- Died: 15 October 2004 (aged 82)
- Occupations: Film score composer, music director
- Instrument: Violin

Thiruthuraipoondi Radhakrishnan Sivasankaran (T. R. Pappa) (3 July 1922 – 15 October 2004) was an Indian music director of Tamil, Telugu and Sinhalese films. He was born at Thiruthuraipoondi, Madras Presidency, British India.

== Early life ==
Papa's real name was Sivasankaran, who was from a lineage of musical family in Thruthuraipoondi. He started training on the violin from early childhood. Since his father, Radhakrishnan, was unable to pay tuition fees his education was stopped in the middle. He was trained by Siva Vadivelu Pillai who joined in National movie tone cinema company, as fiddle player to some movies Seemanthini 1936 Parvathi Kalyanam 1936 and this life of carrying instruments ended in 1938.

After he joined as a helper to S.G. Kasi Iyer, elder brother of great Kittappa. In 1941 most of the citizens was flying to other towns due to fear of Japanese Bombing Jupiter Pictures was shifted to Coimbatore, M.S.Viswanathan went with S.V.Venkatraman who is famous music director on those days. Kalki's daughter Ananthi, Sadasivam's daughter Radha were dancers, jointly made dance Programmes, M.S.Viswanathan as Playback Singer along with Papa Violin.

== Career ==
Papa started playing the violin in Manonmani (Modern Theatres) and Kannagi, Kubera Kuchela and Mahamaya (Jupiter Pictures). In the late 40s, Papa and T. K. Ramamoorthy were the highest paid violinists for the movies and were always in demand. He was the Director of Music Colleges

Papa became music director for Malayalam film Aathmasanthi in 1952. The chance was given to him by Joseph Thaliath Jr. of Citadel Film Corporation. This film is dubbed in Tamil under the same title.

Then onwards, Papa went on to compose for many of Citadel films such as Mallika, Vijayapuri Veeran, Vilakketriyaval, Iravum Pagalum and Kathal Paduthum Padu.

Papa also composed music for many Sinhalese films. The song Siriyame Sara, sung by H. R. Jothipala is one of the popular hits in Sinhalese.

He worked with singers like T. M. Soundararajan, A. M. Rajah, Seerkazhi Govindarajan, Thiruchi Loganathan, C. S. Jayaraman, S. C. Krishnan, A. L. Raghavan, M. L. Vasanthakumari, P. Leela, Jikki, T. V. Rathnam, A. P. Komala, P. B. Sreenivas, K. Jamuna Rani, P. Susheela, A. G. Rathnamala, T. S. Bagavathi, Soolamangalam Rajalakshmi, A. Nithyakala, S. Janaki, L. R. Eswari, S. P. Balasubrahmaniam, B. S. Sasirekha and S. P. Sailaja.

The singing actors K. R. Ramasamy, T. R. Rajakumari, P. Bhanumathi, N. S. Krishnan, T. A. Madhuram and J. P. Chandrababu also sang memorable songs under his compositions.

As a Nilaya Vidwan of AIR from 1946, Papa accompanied the violin for many great classical vocalists. He composed music for many wonderful devotional albums with Seerkazhi Govindarajan where the song Chinnanjiru Penn Pole dedicated to the Goddess Abirami is notable. Papa scored music for the album Abirami Andhaadhi. Papa has served as the Principal of Madras Music College.

T. R. Ramanna and Papa were classmates in Thanjavur. T. R. Ramanna was in the midst of the making of Arunagirinathar when the music director G. Ramanathan fell ill. Papa was called upon to complete the rest of the songs. T. R. Ramana again engaged Papa for his movies in the early 1970s.

Tamil Isai Sangam conferred the title Isai Perarignar (Great Scholar of Music) on him.

== Works ==
Some of the notable music compositions:

- Enna Enna Inbame for Anbu by A. M. Rajah and Jikki
- Samarasam Ulaavum Idame for Rambaiyin Kaadhal by Seerkazhi Govindarajan
- Bagavane Mounam Eno for Rambaiyin Kaadhal by Seerkazhi Govindarajan
- Varuven Naan Unadhu for Mallika by A. M. Rajah and P. Susheela
- Chinnanjiru Vayathu Mudhal for Thaai Magalukku Kattiya Thaali by T. M. Soundararajan and Jikki
- Yaar Solluvaar Nilave for Kuravanji by C. S. Jayaraman
- Sirikkindraal Indru Sirikkindraal for Nallavan Vazhvan by Sirkazhi Govindarajan and P. Susheela
- Ullam Thedaathe Endru Solluthe for Ethaiyum Thangum Idhayam by K. R. Ramasamy and S. Janaki
- Unakkum Enakkum Veguthooram Illai for Ethaiyum Thangum Idhayam by Soolamangalam Rajalakshmi
- Muththaitharu Paththithala for Arunagirinathar by T. M. Soundararajan
- Onnume puriyale ulagathile for Kumara Raja by J. P. Chandrababu
- Ullathin Kadhavugal Kanngalada for Iravum Pagalum by T. M. Soundararajan
- Muththama Asai Muththama for Vilakketriyaval by P. Susheela
- Asai Ponggum Azhagu Roobam for Asai by A. M. Rajah and Jikki
- Soodi Koduthaval Naan Thozhi for Teacheramma by P. Susheela
- Thalai Vaari poochoodi Unnai for Rangoon Radha by P. Bhanumathi
- Iraivan Endroru Kavignan for Yen by S. P. Balasubrahmaniam
- Ullathile Uram Vendumada for Vijayapuri Veeran by A. M. Rajah
- Vennila Nerathile Venugaanam for Avasara Kalyanam by P. Susheela

== Filmography ==
Year	Film	Language	Director	Banner	Co-Music Directors
1952	Aathmasanthi	Malayalam	Joseph Thaliath Jr.	Citadel Film Corporation	
1952	Aathmasanthi	Tamil	Joseph Thaliath Jr.	Citadel Film Corporation	
1952	Alphonsa	Malayalam	O. J. Thottan	Jeo Productions	
1952	Mappillai	Tamil	T. R. Raghunath	National Productions	N. S. Balakrishnan
1953	Anbu	Tamil	M. Natesan	Natesh Art Pictures	
1954	Iddaru Pellalu	Telugu	F. Nagoor	Nagoor Cine Productions	T. A. Kalyanam & T. K. Kumaraswamy
1954	Sandehi	Malayalam	F. Nagoor	Nagoor Cine Productions	
1954	Ammaiyappan	Tamil	A. Bhimsingh	National Pictures	
1955	Surangani	Sinhala	Cyril P Abeyratne	Ceylon Theatres Ltd.	
1956	Aasai	Tamil	M. Natesan	Natesh Art Pictures	
1956	Graha Devatha	Malayalam	F. Nagoor	Nagoor Cine Productions	
1956	Kudumba Vilakku	Tamil	F. Nagoor	Nagoor Cine Productions	
1956	Raja Rani	Tamil	A. Bhim Singh	National Pictures	
1956	Rambaiyin Kaadhal	Tamil	R. R. Chandran	Kalpana Pictures	
1956	Rangoon Radha	Tamil	A. Kasilingam	Mekala Pictures	
1956	Surathali	Sinhala	Cyril P Abeyratne	Ceylon Entertainments	
1957	Deva Sundari	Malayalam	M. K. R. Nambiar	Munna's Films	
1957	Mallika	Tamil	Joseph Thaliath Jr.	Citadel Film Corporation	
1959	Thaai Magalukku Kattiya Thaali	Tamil	R. R. Chandran	Kalpana Kala Mandir	
1960	Kuravanji	Tamil	A. Kasilingam	Mekala Pictures	
1960	Subhadra	Sinhala	S R Charlie & Cyril P Abeyratne	C P A Producers	
1960	Sundara Birinda	Sinhala	T. Yoganandan	Ceylon Entertainments)	
1960	Vijayapuri Veeran	Tamil	Joseph Thaliath Jr.	Citadel Film Corporation	
1960	Mugguru Veerulu	Telugu	Joseph Thaliath Jr.	Citadel Film Corporation	
1961	Kumara Raja	Tamil	G. K. Ramu	Sivakami Pictures	
1961	Nallavan Vazhvan	Tamil	P. Neelakantan	Arasu Pictures	
1961	Veeradhi Veerudu	Telugu	A. Kasilingam	Mekala Pictures	A. A. Raj
1962	Ethaiyum Thangum Ithaiyam	Tamil	P. Neelakantan	Udhaya Suriyan Productions	
1962	Seemaan Petra Selvangal	Tamil	S. Ramakrishnan	Paramu Films	
1964	Arunagirinathar	Tamil	T. R. Ramanna	Baba Art Productions	G. Ramanathan
1964	Sujage Rahasa	Sinhala	P. Neelakantan		
1965	Iravum Pagalum	Tamil	Joseph Thaliath Jr.	Citadel Film Corporation	
1965	Kathal Paduthum Padu	Tamil	Joseph Thaliath Jr.	Citadel Film Corporation	
1965	Vilakketriyaval	Tamil	Joseph Thaliath Jr.	Citadel Film Corporation	
1966	Kathal Paduthum Padu	Tamil	Joseph Thaliath Jr.	Citadel Film Corporation	
1967	Premalo Pramadam	Telugu	Joseph Thaliath Jr.	Citadel Film Corporation	
1967	Pandhayam	Tamil	A. Kasilingam	M. K. Movies	
1968	Teacheramma	Tamil	Puttanna Kanagal	Subbulakshmi Pictures	
1969	Avare En Daivam	Tamil	C. N. Shanmugam	Meenakshi Sundareswar Films	
1969	Magane Nee Vazhga	Tamil	M. Krishnan Nair	Subbulakshmi Pictures	
1970	Yaen?	Tamil	T. R. Ramanna	E.V.R. Pictures	
1971	Arutperunjothi	Tamil	A. T. Krishnaswamy	Balu Films	
1972	Avasara Kalyanam	Tamil	V. T. Thyagarajan	Subblakshmi Movies	
1972	Yaar Jambulingam	Tamil	M. S. Gopinathan	Sri Govindan Films	
1973	Maru Piravi	Tamil	T. R. Ramanna	Vijaya & Suri Combines	
1974	Idhayam Parkiradhu	Tamil	A. Jagannathan	Udhaya Arts	
1974	Vairam	Tamil	T. R. Ramanna	Vijaya & Suri Combines	
1976	Vayilla Poochi	Tamil	K. S. Gopalakrishnan	Kalavalli Combines	
1996	Enga Chinna Ponnu	Tamil			
