= Rangoon Radha =

- Theatrical release poster
- Directed by: A. Kasilingam
- Screenplay by: Mu. Karunanidhi
- Story by: C. N. Annadurai
- Starring: Sivaji Ganesan; P. Bhanumathi
- Cinematography: G. Durai
- Edited by: K. Perumal
- Music by: T. R. Pappa
- Production company: Mekala Pictures
- Release date: 1 November 1956
- Running time: 129 minutes
- Country: India
- Language: Tamil

Rangoon Radha is a 1956 Indian Tamil-language film directed by A. Kasilingam and written by M. Karunanidhi from a story by C. N. Annadurai. The film stars Sivaji Ganesan and P. Bhanumathi. Based on the 1944 American film Gaslight, it is about a man trying to steal his wife's fortune. The film was released on 1 November 1956.

== Plot ==
Kottaiyur Dharmalinga Mudaliyar is a cunning man who appears noble to the outside world. Rangam is his virtuous and long-suffering wife. Dharmalinga Mudaliyaar also has an eye on his sister-in-law Thangam. In order to marry Thangam and get control of the abundant wealth of the sisters, Dharamlingam ensures that everyone believes that Rangam is possessed by some evil spirit and is slowly becoming insane.

== Cast ==
- Sivaji Ganesan as Dharmalingam Mudaliar
- P. Bhanumathi as Rangam
- S. S. Rajendran as Nagasundaram
- Rajasulochana as Radha
- M. N. Rajam as Thangam
- N. S. Krishnan as Naidu Vaidhiyar
- T. A. Mathuram
- Rajagopal as Naidu's assistant

Support cast

- Nambirajan
- Dhakshinamoorthy
- Damodharan
- P. S. Gnanam
- Mohana
- Lakshmi Ammal

== Production ==
The screenplay of Rangoon Radha was written by M. Karunanidhi from a story by C. N. Annadurai. The main plot was inspired by the 1944 American film Gaslight.

== Soundtrack ==
The music was composed by T. R. Pappa. One of the lyricists, Pattukkottai Kalyanasundaram was paid ₹1,000 per song, a princely sum for the time.

Song	Singers	Lyrics	Length (m:ss)
"Podhu Nalam Endrum Podhu Nalam"	C. S. Jayaraman	M. Karunanidhi	
"Thalaivaari Poochoodi Unnai"	P. Bhanumathi	Bharathidasan	02:52
"Ayarpaadi Kannaa Nee Aada Vaaraai Ennodu"	T. V. Rathnam	M. Karunanidhi	02:46
"Sankariye Kaaliyammaa Ammaachaamundiye Maari Thaaye"	N. S. Krishnan	N. S. Krishnan	03:48
"Pennaga Irundha Yennai ...Kaiyil Pirambedutthu"	P. Bhanumathi	M. K. Athmanathan	03:49
"Endrudhaan Thirundhuvadho"	C. S. Jayaraman	Udumalai Narayana Kavi	03:36
"Oli Padaiththa Kanninaai Vaa Vaa Vaa"	T. S. Bagavathi	Mahakavi Bharathiyar	02:35
"Thamizhe Thene Kanne Thaalelo"	P. Bhanumathi	M. Karunanidhi	03:25
"Ooradangum Velaiyile Ullam Kavarum Solaiyile"	P. Susheela	Pattukkottai Kalyanasundaram	03:00
"Vaan Malar Solaiyil.... Kaatril Aadum Mullaikkodiye"	P. Bhanumathi	M. Karunanidhi	03:25
"Naatukkoru Veeran"	Seerkazhi Govindarajan & A. G. Rathnamala	Pattukkottai Kalyanasundaram	11:30

== Release and reception ==
Rangoon Radha was released on 1 November 1956. Historian Randor Guy noted, "In spite of the formidable writing credits, excellent cast and outstanding performances, Rangoon Radha did not do well as one had expected. Perhaps the negative role of Sivaji Ganesan had contributed to its not-so-warm welcome". Annadurai was besotted by the histrionics that Bhanumathi displayed in the film, and conferred upon her the title Nadippukku Ilakkanam vahuthava (The woman who wrote the grammar for acting).
