= Kudumba Vilakku =

- Theatrical release poster
- Directed by: F. Nagoor
- Screenplay by: A. K. Velan; C. K. T. Rajan; Kangeyan
- Story by: Nagoor Cine Productions; Story Department
- Produced by: Minal
- Starring: P. V. Narasimha Bharathi; Jamuna
- Cinematography: Jiten Bannerji; V. Kumaradevan
- Edited by: P. V. Narayanan
- Music by: T. R. Pappa
- Production company: Nagoor Cine Productions
- Release date: 14 June 1956
- Country: India
- Languages: Tamil; Malayalam

Kudumba Vilakku (transl. Family lamp) is a 1956 Indian Tamil-language drama film directed by F. Nagoor. The film stars P. V. Narasimha Bharathi and Jamuna. It was also shot in Malayalam with the title Graha Devatha. The film was released on 14 June 1956.

== Plot ==
Radha is married to Kanagasabai, a Zamindar. The couple have no children. Kanagasabai marries Pushpa, with Radha's consent. In the meantime, Radha gets pregnant. Pushpa and her uncle Appasami try to abort the baby, but Radha safely delivers a boy. While Radha is in a delirious state, Pushpa and Appasami hand over the baby to a servant, Gopal and order him to kill the child. But Gopal takes it to the next village and dumps the baby in a garbage bin. Kaathaan comes to clear the bin and finds the baby. He and his wife Pechi decide to bring up the baby, name him Marudhan and move to the Zamindar's village in order to escape from neighbours' prying eyes.

Peychi gets employed as a servant in the zamin bungalow. She takes the baby with her. Radha becomes fond of the baby. Pushpa and Appasami poison the zamindar's mind and make him chase Radha out of the house. Kaathaan's hut is also burnt. While going aimlessly on the road in another village, Radha picks up a girl child, Kannamma. Kaathaan and Peychi also comes and settles down in the same village. Years roll by. Marudhan becomes a building contractor.

Radha works as a labourer in a building. One day she slips and fall down. Marudhan takes her to her home and meets Kannamma. As Radha is injured, Kannamma goes to work in the building. Marudhan and Kannamma become lovers. When Kaathaan and Peychi learn of their love, they go to Kannamma's house to arrange the marriage. When they met Radha there, they are shocked. But Radha explains that Kannamma is her adopted daughter. Radha tells them her full story. Marudhan gets angry and goes to zamindar's house to settle affairs.

After chasing Radha, Pushpa takes control of the zamin and imprisons Kanagasabai. But he manages to escape. Pushpa sends Appasami to find and bring back Kanagasabai. Appasami finds Kanagasabai and tries to get hold of him. In the nick of time, Marudhan comes to the spot and rescues Kanagasabai. He takes him to the zamin bungalow. When Marudhan argues with Pushpa, she suspects that he may know the full story. So he plans to kill him. In the meantime, Kathan meets Gopal and takes him to his house. Gopal explains what happened. So Radha discovers that Marudhan is her own son. All of them goes to the zamindar's house. How the problems are solved forms the rest of the story.

== Cast ==
List adapted from the film's song book.

Male cast

- P. V. Narasimhabharathi as Marudhan
- M. G. Chakrapani as Kanagasabai
- N. S. Krishnan as Kathan
- T. S. Durairaj as Appasami
- K. A. Thangavelu as Vajravelu
- T. V. Sethuraman as Sukku
- M. S. Thirupathisami as Gopal
- Master Vijayakumar as Baby Marudhan

Female cast

- M. V. Rajamma as Radha
- N. Jamuna as Kannamma
- K. Lakshmikantham as Pushpa
- T. A. Mathuram as Pechi
- Geetha as Mangu
- Seetha as Sundari
- Kumari Padmini as Baby Kannamma

Dance

- Rajasulochana
- Kusalakumari
- E. V. Saroja
- Rajam Sisters

== Production ==
The film was produced and directed by F. Nagoor under his own banner Nagoor Cine Productions. A. K. Velan, C. K. T. Rajan and Kangeyan wrote the screenplay and dialogues. V. Kumaradevan did the cinematography supervised by Jiten Bannerji while P. V. Narayanan did the editing. Audiography was done by M. V. Karunakaran supervised by Dhinsha K. Tehrani. Art direction was by N. Kuppusamy and Chinnilal and Sampathkumar handled the choreography. Still photography was done by K. Rathinavelu. The film was shot at Neptune Studios. The film was also produced in Malayalam with the title Graha Devatha.

== Soundtrack ==
Music was composed by T. R. Pappa.

Song	Singer/s	Lyricist	Length
"Ennum Manadhinil"	Andal	Subbu Arumugam	03:31
"Panavin Aasaiyinale"	Susheela	A. Maruthakasi	02:30
"Koottal Perukkal Vaguthal"	N. S. Krishnan & Party	N. S. Krishnan	02:19
"Abalaiyin Gathiyidhuvo"	Sirkazhi Govindarajan	Subbu Arumugam	03:25
"Inidhana Pechile"	Ghantasala, P. Leela	Kambadasan	03:09
"Kanna Nee Vaa Ennudan"	Ghantasala, P. Leela	Purakshidasan	04:01
"Kanni Ponnu Nanunga"	Susheela	A. Maruthakasi	03:48
