= Thanjai N. Ramaiah Dass =

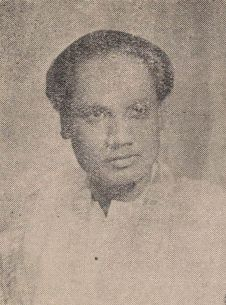
- A photograph of Ramaiah Dass, published in the Tamil monthly magazine Kundoosi (November 1951)
- Born: Narayanasamy Ramaiah Dass; 5 June 1914; Manambuchavadi, Tanjore District, Madras Presidency, British India (now in Thanjavur, Tamil Nadu, India)
- Died: 16 January 1965 (aged 50); Madras, Madras State (now Chennai, Tamil Nadu), India
- Occupation: Poet
- Known for: Poet, Writer
- Spouses: Thaayaarammal; Ranganayagi
- Children: Vijayarani; Ravindran
- Parent(s): Narayanasamy; Pappu

Thanjai N. Ramaiah Dass (1914-1965) was an Indian poet and script writer who wrote mainly in the Tamil language. He wrote more than 500 lyrics for Tamil films.

== Early life ==
Born to Narayanasamy and Pappu at Manampoochavadi in Thanjavur district, he had his primary and secondary education at St. Peters Higher Secondary school in Thanjavur. Then he graduated as a Pulavar from Karanthai Thamizh Sangam. He was trained as a teacher.

== Career ==
He started his career as a teacher in a primary school in Thanjavur. While he was working as a teacher, he became interested in stage plays. Soon he joined a drama troupe Sudharsana Ghana Sabha founded by Jagannatha Naidu, as a writer. Then he created his own drama troupe Jayalakshmi Ghana Sabha and produced plays like Macharegai, Dhuruvan, Kambhar, Vidhiyin Pokku, Valli Thirumanam, Alli Arjuna, Pavalakodi and Pahadai Pannirendu. He staged these plays in several towns in Tamil Nadu. Actor and Film Producer T. R. Mahalingam once watched one of his plays and produced it as a film with the same title Macha Regai in 1950. Though the film failed in box office, it opened the way to Ramaiah Dass to settle in Chennai and work in Tamil films.

Vijaya Productions was one of the leading film makers who made Tamil and Telugu films. Ramaiah Dass became a permanent writer in this film company from 1950 till 1960. He wrote screenplay, dialogues and lyrics to almost all the Tamil films produced by this company during this period. His songs in films like Pathala Bhairavi, Missiamma, Mayabazar became hits.

He was famous for coining words to suit the tune but without any meaning. They were called Jigina words and he was nicknamed as Dappanguthu Paadalaasiriyar (means one who writes lyrics to the beats on a tin box). However, those songs became hits. A case in point is the song "Jaalilo Jimkhaanaa, Dolilo Kumkaanaa" from the film Amara Deepam. None of the words had any meaning but the song was a hit.

In all he wrote 532 lyrics in 83 films, wrote screenplay and dialogues for 25 films and wrote story for 10 films between 1950 and 1963.

== Producer ==
He produced a film titled "Lalithangi" with M. G. Ramachandran in the lead role. As per the story the main character is a religiously devoted young man. He created a scene with a song praising God. But M. G. R. who was a front-line member in Dravida Munnetra Kazhagam that had atheist policy, refused to act in the scene. 10 thousand feet of the film had already been shot. Anyway, Ramaiah Dass stopped the production and produced the same story with the title Rani Lalithangi with Sivaji Ganesan in the lead role. MGR challenged him in judicial courts but Ramaiah Dass was unperturbed. He won the case. However, MGR continued to be in good terms with him.

His daughter said by producing films he lost what he earned as a writer.

== Writer ==
He wrote a book titled Thirukural Isai Amudham in 1962. The book was released by M. G. Ramachandran who was the President of the South Indian Artistes Society at that time.

The Government of Tamil Nadu paid ₹600,000 to his family and made his works as public property.

== Guru ==
In 1952, a young man, Jesudoss was introduced to Ramaiah Dass. He made the young man as his assistant and christened him as Aroordas. (Jesudoss was from Thiruvarur.) Aroordas later turned out to be a most popular writer in Tamil films.

== Family ==
Ramaiah Dass had two wives - Thaayaarammal and Ranganayagi. He had a daughter, Vijayarani and a son, Ravindran from each wife. Ravindran is an Editor in Prasad Lab while Vijayarani is a housewife.

== Death ==
Ramaiah Dass died on 16 January 1965. Medical cause of death was alcoholism-related.
