= List of Tamil films of 1954 =

Prior to the amendment of Tamil Nadu Entertainments Tax Act 1939 on 1 April 1958, Gross was 133.33 per cent of Nett for all films. Commercial Taxes Department disclosed ₹0.79 crore in entertainment tax revenue for the year.

The following is a list of films produced in the Tamil film industry in India in 1954, in alphabetical order.

== 1954 ==
| Title | Director | Production | Music | Cast | Release date |
|---|---|---|---|---|---|
| Ammaiyappan | A. Bhimsingh | National Pictures | T. R. Pappa | S. S. Rajendran, S. Varalakshmi, G. Sakunthala, D. Balasubramaniam, V. K. Ramasamy | 24-09-1954 |
| Andha Naal | S. Balachander | AVM Productions | Saraswathy Stores Orchestra | Sivaji Ganesan, Pandari Bai, Javar Seetharaman, T. K. Balachandran, K. Suryakala, P. D. Sambandam, Menaka | 13-04-1954 |
| Avan Yaar; Dubbed from Malayalam | Antony Mitradas | Neela Productions | Brother Lakshmanan | Prem Nazir, Pankajavalli, Miss Kumari, S. P. Pillai, Kottarakkara, Adoor Pankajam, Bahadoor | |
| Chandraharam | K. Kamaswara Rao | Vijaya Productions | Ghantasala | N. T. Rama Rao, Sriranjani, K. Savitri, S. V. Ranga Rao, Relangi, Suryakantham | 14-01-1954 |
| Edhir Paradhathu | Ch. Narayanamoorthy | Saravanabhava Unity Pictures | C. N. Pandurangan | Sivaji Ganesan, Padmini (actress)|Padmini, V. Nagayya, S. Varalakshmi, S. V. Sahasranamam, Friend Ramasamy, K. S. Angamuthu | 09-12-1954 |
| En Magal | K. V. R. Acharya; M. K. R. Nambiar | Ashoka Pictures | C. N. Pandurangan | Ranjan, S. Varalakshmi, M. N. Nambiar, Mynavathi, M. G. Chakrapani, Bombay Meenakshi, A. Karunanidhi | 25-10-1954 |
| Illara Jothi | G. R. Rao | Modern Theatres | G. Ramanathan | Sivaji Ganesan, Padmini (actress)|Padmini, Sriranjani, K. A. Thangavelu, S. A. Asokan, C. K. Saraswathi | 09-04-1954 |
| Irulukku Pin; Dubbed from Malayalam | E. R. Cooper | Neela Productions | Brother Lakshmanan | Prem Nazir, Lalitha, Thikkurissy Sukumaran Nair, Kottarakkara, S. P. Pillai, Adoor Pankajam | |
| Kalyanam Panniyum Brahmachari | P. Neelakantan | Padmini Pictures | T. G. Lingappa | Sivaji Ganesan, Padmini, T. R. Ramachandran, Ragini | 13-04-1954 |
| Kanavu | P. V. Krishnan | K. R. K. Productions | G. Ramanathan; V. Dakshinamoorthy | G. Muthukrishnan, Lalitha, V. K. Ramasamy, R. Balasubramaniam, Pollachi Kamala | 05-08-1954 |
| Karkottai | Kemparaj Urs | Kemparaj Productions | S. V. Venkatraman; G. Ramanathan | Kemparaj Urs, Krishna Kumari, K. Sarangapani, B. R. Panthulu, M. V. Rajamma | 12-03-1954 |
| Koondukkili | T. R. Ramanna | R. R. Pictures | K. V. Mahadevan | M. G. Ramachandran, Sivaji Ganesan, B. S. Saroja, T. D. Kusalakumari, K. Sarangapani, G. Sakunthala, Friend Ramasamy, V. M. Ezhumalai, T. P. Muthulakshmi, E. R. Sahadevan, K. S. Angamuthu | 26-08-1954 |
| Kudumbam | Jampana | Jampana Nandi Productions | Pendyala Nageswara Rao | C. H. Narayana Rao, G. Varalakshmi, Sriram, Savitri, K. A. Thangavelu, T. S. Durairaj, C. K. Saraswathi | |
| Malaikkallan | S. M. Sriramulu Naidu | Pakshiraja Studios | S. M. Subbaiah Naidu | M. G. Ramachandran, P. Bhanumathi, M. G. Chakrapani, D. Balasubramaniam, T. S. Durairaj, Surabhi Balasaraswathi, V. M. Ezhumalai | 22-07-1954 |
| Mangalyam | K. Somu | M. A. V. Pictures | K. V. Mahadevan | A. P. Nagarajan, B. S. Saroja, M. N. Nambiar, Rajasulochana, A. Karunanidhi, C. T. Rajakantham | 01-06-1954 |
| Manohara | L. V. Prasad | Manohar Pictures | S. V. Venkatraman; T. R. Ramanathan | Sivaji Ganesan, T. R. Rajakumari, P. Kannamba, Girija, S. S. Rajendran, Javar Seetharaman | 03-03-1954 |
| Mathiyum Mamathaiyum | G. M. Basheer | Chandra Mohan Saleen Pictures | | G. M. Baaheer, Mohan, Rajeswari, Kulsar Begam | 18-09-1954 |
| Nallakalam | K. Vembu; J. Sinha | Jaishanti Pictures | K. V. Mahadevan | M. K. Radha, Pandari Bai, T. S. Balaiah, N. S. Krishnan, T. A. Madhuram | 22-05-1954 |
| Nanban | P. S. Srinivasa | M. D. V. Productions | G. Ramanathan | R. S. Manohar, P. K. Saraswathi, T. S. Balaiah, K. A. Thangavelu, V. Nagayya | 25-10-1954 |
| Padmini | | Ashoka Pictures | S. G. K. Pillai | P. S. Govindan, M. S. Draupathi, T. S. Balaiah, G. Sakunthala, A. Karunanidhi, T. P. Muthulakshmi | |
| Panam Paduthum Padu | Y. R. Swamy | Rohini Pictures | T. A. Kalyanam | N. T. Rama Rao, Sowcar Janaki, Jamuna, K. A. Thangavelu, Serukalathur Sama | 04-03-1954 |
| Penn | M. V. Raman | AVM Productions | R. Sudharsanam | Vyjayanthimala, Gemini Ganesan, Anjali Devi, S. Balachander, V. Nagayya, K. Sarangapani | 25-06-1954 |
| Ponvayal | A. T. Krishnaswamy | Jayanthi Pictures | Thurayur Rajgopal Sarma; R. Rajagopal | Anjali Devi, T. R. Ramachandran, R. S. Manohar, Mynavathi, K. Sarangapani, T. P. Muthulakshmi, K. A. Thangavelu | 12-02-1954 |
| Pona Machaan Thirumbi Vandhan | C. S. Rao | Mercury Films | M. S. Viswanathan; C. N. Pandurangan | Sriram, T. D. Kusalakumari, K. A. Thangavelu, 'Friend' Ramasami, K. S. Angamuthu, Lakshmikantham | 26-11-1954 |
| Pudhu Yugam | Gopu-Sundar | Sri Sai Ganamirtha Pictures | G. Ramanathan | P. V. Narasimha Bharathi, Krishnakumari, M. S. Draupadi, S. V. Subbaiah, S. A. Natarajan, M. Saroja | 04-06-1954 |
| Rajee En Kanmani | K. J. Mahadevan | Gemini Studios | S. Hanumantha Rao | T. R. Ramachandran, Sriranjani, Sriram, S. V. Ranga Rao, J. P. Chandrababu, T. P. Muthulakshmi | 29-01-1954 |
| Ratha Kanneer | Krishnan–Panju | National Pictures | C. S. Jayaraman; Viswanathan–Ramamoorthy | M. R. Radha, S. S. Rajendran, Sriranjani, M. N. Rajam, J. P. Chandrababu | 15-10-1954 |
| Ratha Paasam | R. S. Mani | Avvai Productions | M. K. Athmanathan; A. V. Natarajan | T. K. Shanmugam, T. K. Bhagavathi, Anjali Devi, M. S. Draupadhi, T. S. Balaiah, N. R. Vidyavathi | 14-08-1954 |
| Sorgavasal | A. Kasilingam | Parimalam Pictures | Viswanathan–Ramamoorthy | K. R. Ramasamy, Padmini, S. S. Rajendran, Anjali Devi | 28-05-1954 |
| Sugam Enge | K. Ramnoth | Modern Theatres | Viswanathan–Ramamoorthy | K. R. Ramasamy, Savitri, K. A. Thangavelu, J. P. Chandrababu, T. P. Muthulakshmi | 09-09-1954 |
| Thookku Thookki | R. M. Krishnasami | Aruna Films | G. Ramanathan | Sivaji Ganesan, Lalitha, Padmini, Ragini, T. S. Balaiah | 26-08-1954 |
| Thuli Visham | A. S. A. Sami | Narasu Studios | K. N. Dandayudhapani Pillai | K. R. Ramasamy, Sivaji Ganesan, Krishna Kumari, P. K. Saraswathi, S. V. Ranga Rao, Mukkamala, D. V. Narayanasami, S. D. Subbulakshmi, Kaka Radhakrishnan, T. P. Muthulakshmi | 30-07-1954 |
| Vaira Maalai | N. Jagannath | Vaidhya Films | Viswanathan–Ramamoorthy | R. S. Manohar, Padmini, K. A. Thangavelu, Ragini, K. R. Chellam, V. S. Raghavan, Mali, Friend Ramasami | 25-09-1954 |
| Veerasundari | Jingade; M. R. Ranganath | Sri Sundari Pictures | G. Ramanathan; Rathinavel Mudaliar | K. P. Janakiram, K. P. J. Sundarambal, Sairam, Angamuthu, Kirupanidhi, M. N. Rajam, Stunt Somu, Kumari N. Rajam | 30-12-1954 |
| Viduthalai | K. Ramnoth | New Era Production | Lakshman Raghunath | V. Nagayya, R. S. Manohar, Krishna Kumari, Javar Seetharaman, T. V. Kumudhini | 12-02-1954 |
| Vilayattu Bommai | T. R. Raghunath | Sri Sukumar Productions | T. G. Lingappa | T. R. Mahalingam, Kumari Kamala, K. Sarangapani, K. A. Thangavelu, E. V. Saroja, Lakshmiprabha | 14-05-1954 |
