= C. S. Jayaraman =

Indian Tamil singer, actor, and music director

C. S. Jayaraman சி. எஸ். ஜெயராமன்
- Born: 6 January 1917; Chidambaram, Madras Presidency, British India (now Tamil Nadu, India)
- Died: 29 January 1995 (aged 78)
- Genre: Film
- Occupations: Actor, playback singer, music director
- Instrument: Vocalist

Chidambaram Sundaram Jayaraman or C. S. Jayaraman (Tamil: சி. எஸ். ஜெயராமன்) (6 January 1917 – 29 January 1995) was a noted actor, music director and a successful playback singer, whose numerous songs were featured in many Tamil films from the 1940s and 1960s.

== Early life ==
Jayaraman hailed from the temple town Chidambaram and his father was the noted traditional Tamil music vocalist Sundaram Pillai. Jayaraman was a brother in law of M. Karunanidhi, then the chief minister of Tamil Nadu, India. It was through the courtesy of Jayaraman, who had solicited a movie-industry career to Karunanidhi as a good script writer to the senior script writer-cum-director Arul Soosai Arokiya Sami, popularly known as A. S. A. Sami. M. Karunanidhi entered the Tamil movie world in 1947 in the A. S. A. Sami directed movie Rajakumari, which starred M. G. Ramachandran in the hero role.

== Career and life ==
Jayaraman was born on 6 January 1917. He had begun acting in Tamil movies in 1934. The names of movies he had starred in include Krishna Leela (1934), Bhakta Duruvan (1935), Nalla Thangaal (1935), Leelavathi Sulochana (1936), Izhantha Kaadhal (1941), Poompaavai (1944) and Krishna Bakthi (1948).

In addition, he was the sole music director for the Tamil movies Udayanan Vaasavathatha (1946) and Ratha Kanneer (1954). For two movies, Vijayakumari (1950) and Krishna Vijayam (1950), he functioned as a co-music director as well. Jayaraman's gifted tremolo voice and his enunciation of Tamil words had a mystic charm and grace, to the point that he had the title "Tamil Isai Chittar" (Tamil: தமிழ் இசை சித்தர்), which reads as Tamil Music Mystic. Jayaraman also had sung a number of songs in Kannada. One of his Kannada songs, Shivappa Kayo thande, from Bedara Kannappa starring Rajkumar, became a huge hit and is played even today.

Jayaraman is one of those singers who have performed full-fledged Tirukkural concerts.

Jayaraman died on 29 January 1995, 23 days after his 78th birthday.

== Discography ==
Year	Film	Language	Song	Music	Lyrics	Co-singer	Actor
1949	Krishna Bakthi	Tamil	Aattam Enna Solluven	S. V. Venkatraman, G. Ramanathan & Kunnakudi Venkatarama Iyer	Udumalai Narayana Kavi		Himself
1949	Krishna Bakthi	Tamil	Edhu Vendumn	S. V. Venkatraman, G. Ramanathan & Kunnakudi Venkatarama Iyer	Udumalai Narayana Kavi		Himself
1951	Manamagal	Tamil	Villambu Patta Pun	C. R. Subburaman	Udumalai Narayana Kavi		Kaka Radhakrishnan
1952	Parasakthi	Tamil	Desam Gnanam Kalvi	R. Sudarsanam	Udumalai Narayana Kavi		Sivaji Ganesan
1952	Parasakthi	Tamil	Kaa Kaa Kaa	R. Sudarsanam	Udumalai Narayana Kavi		Sivaji Ganesan
1952	Parasakthi	Tamil	Nenju Porukkuthillaiyae	R. Sudarsanam	Mahakavi Bharathiyar		Sivaji Ganesan
1952	Andhaman Kaidhi	Tamil	Kaani Nilam Vendum Parasakthi	G. Govindarajulu Naidu	Mahakavi Bharathiyar	M. L. Vasanthakumari	MGR
1952	Andhaman Kaidhi	Tamil	Inbam Illadha Illara Vaazhvil	G. Govindarajulu Naidu	Ku. Sa. Krishnamoorthy	dialogues by P. K. Saraswathi & K. Sarangapani	Echo Song
1952	Velaikaran	Tamil	Paadupadupavarke	R. Sudarsanam	Kavimani Desigavinayagam Pillai		
1952	Velaikaran	Tamil	Manidhaa Nee Seidha Vinaithaane	R. Sudarsanam	K. P. Kamatchisundaram		
1953	Ponni	Tamil	Mazhaiyai Nambi Uyir Vaazhum	S. M. Subbaiah Naidu			Title Song
1953	Manidhanum Mirugamum	Tamil	Kalamenum Chirpi Seidha	G. Govindarajulu Naidu	S. D. Sundharam		Sivaji Ganesan
1953	Naam	Tamil	Paappaa Eppodhum Bayame	C. S. Jayaraman	M. Karunanidhi	T. R. Gajalakshmi	
1953	Naam	Tamil	Edhaiyum Thaangum Idhayam	C. S. Jayaraman	M. Karunanidhi		
1954	Ratha Kanneer	Tamil	Kutram Purinthavan Vazhkaiyil	C. S. Jayaraman	Ku. Sa. Krishnamoorthy	M. R. Radha (dialogues)	Echo Song
1954	Ratha Kanneer	Tamil	Valayathagi Azhagagi Madhanagi	C. S. Jayaraman			M. R. Radha
1954	Ratha Kanneer	Tamil	Thannai Arindhu	C. S. Jayaraman			Echo Song
1954	Bedara Kannappa	Kannada	Shivappa Kaayotande	R. Sudarsanam	S. Nanjappa		Rajkumar
1954	Bedara Kannappa	Kannada	Shivane Endodane	R. Sudarsanam	S. Nanjappa		Rajkumar
1954	Bedara Kannappa	Kannada	Kaayo Tandeye Seva Karunisee	R. Sudarsanam	S. Nanjappa		Rajkumar
1954	Bedara Kannappa	Kannada	En Manavu Chanchalada	R. Sudarsanam	S. Nanjappa		Rajkumar
1954	Penn	Tamil	Eliyor Manam Paadum Paattile... Aandavan Aagaasamadhil Thoongukinraare	R. Sudarsanam	Udumalai Narayana Kavi		Echo Song
1955	Needhipathi	Tamil	Thaayum Seiyum	Viswanathan–Ramamoorthy	A. Maruthakasi		Echo Song
1955	Needhipathi	Tamil	Thaayum Seiyum (pathos)	Viswanathan–Ramamoorthy	A. Maruthakasi		Echo Song
1955	Needhipathi	Tamil	Annan Thambi	Viswanathan–Ramamoorthy	A. Maruthakasi		Echo Song
1955	Needhipathi	Tamil	Aneedhiyile Urundadhada	Viswanathan–Ramamoorthy	A. Maruthakasi		Echo Song
1955	Kaveri	Tamil	Kaalai Thookki Nindru Aadum	G. Ramanathan	Marimutthu Pillai		Sivaji Ganesan
1955	Kaveri	Tamil	Manjal Veyil Malayile	G. Ramanathan	Udumalai Narayana Kavi	M. L. Vasanthakumari	Sivaji Ganesan
1955	Kaveri	Tamil	Maangaai Paal Undu Malai Mele	G. Ramanathan	Udumalai Narayana Kavi		Sivaji Ganesan
1955	Kaveri	Tamil	Anbe En Aaruyire Angu Nirpatheno	G. Ramanathan	Udumalai Narayana Kavi	Jikki	Sivaji Ganesan
1955	Kaveri	Tamil	Sinthai Arinthu Vadi Selva Kumaran	G. Ramanathan	Udumalai Narayana Kavi		Sivaji Ganesan
1956	Paasavalai	Tamil	Anbinalaae Undaagum 1	Viswanathan–Ramamoorthy	Pattukkottai Kalyanasundaram		Title Song
1956	Paasavalai	Tamil	Anbinalaae Undaagum 2	Viswanathan–Ramamoorthy	Pattukkottai Kalyanasundaram		M. K. Radha
1956	Paasavalai	Tamil	Intha Aattukkum Namma Naattukkum	Viswanathan–Ramamoorthy	Pattukkottai Kalyanasundaram		M. K. Radha
1956	Paasavalai	Tamil	Unakkethu Sondham Enakkethu Sondham	Viswanathan–Ramamoorthy	Pattukkottai Kalyanasundaram		M. K. Radha
1956	Paasavalai	Tamil	Yaarukku Theenggu Seithen.... Kann Illaiyo Manam Illaiyo	Viswanathan–Ramamoorthy	Pattukkottai Kalyanasundaram		M. K. Radha
1956	Paasavalai	Tamil	Idhu Than Ulagamada	Viswanathan–Ramamoorthy	Pattukkottai Kalyanasundaram		M. K. Radha
1956	Rangoon Radha	Tamil	Pothu Nalam Endrum Pothu Nalam	T. R. Pappa	M. Karunanidhi		S. S. Rajendran
1956	Rangoon Radha	Tamil	Endruthaan Thirunthuvadho	T. R. Pappa	Udumalai Narayana Kavi		Echo Song
1956	Kula Dheivam	Tamil	Saaththiram Paarkkaadhe	R. Sudarsanam			Echo Song
1956	Kula Dheivam	Tamil	Inba Vargamellaam.... Vetkamillai Vetkamillai	R. Sudarsanam	Bharathidasan		Echo Song
1956	Aaravalli	Tamil	Iruttaraiyil.... Uyirodu Poradum Velai	G. Ramanathan			Echo Song
1956	Vazhvile Oru Naal	Tamil	Mannilum Vinnilum.... Ezhai Vaazhvil Endrum Thunbam	T. G. Lingappa	Ku. Sa Krishnamurthy		Sivaji Ganesan
1957	Pudhaiyal	Tamil	Vinnodum Mukilodum	Viswanathan–Ramamoorthy	M. K. Athmanathan	P. Susheela	Sivaji Ganesan
1957	Rani Lalithangi	Tamil	Kadhalukku Kann Illai	G. Ramanathan	Pattukkottai Kalyanasundaram		Echo Song
1957	Pudhumai Pithan	Tamil	Ullamrendum Ondru	G. Ramanathan	Thanjai N. Ramaiah Dass	Jikki	MGR
1957	Pudhumai Pithan	Tamil	Melam Kotti Thaali Katti	G. Ramanathan	Thanjai N. Ramaiah Dass		MGR
1957	Pudhumai Pithan	Tamil	Karumbum Erumbum.... Maane Un Mel	G. Ramanathan	Thanjai N. Ramaiah Dass		MGR
1957	Pudhumai Pithan	Tamil	Pittham Theliya Marundhonrikkudhu	G. Ramanathan	Thanjai N. Ramaiah Dass		MGR
1957	Pudhumai Pithan	Tamil	Yaaradi Nee Ingu Vandhaval	G. Ramanathan	Thanjai N. Ramaiah Dass		MGR
1957	Pudhumai Pithan	Tamil	Naadhar Mudi Mel Irukkum	G. Ramanathan	Thanjai N. Ramaiah Dass		MGR
1957	Baagyavathi	Tamil	Vaazhvedhu Nal Vaazhvedhu	S. Dakshinamurthy	A. Maruthakasi		Echo Song
1957	Ambikapathy	Tamil	Andho Paridhaabam	G. Ramanathan			Echo Song
1958	Baktha Ravana	Tamil	Jeya Jeya Mahadeva..... Chandrasekara	R. Sudarsanam & R. Govardhanam	M. K. Athmanathan		N. T. Rama Rao
1958	Baktha Ravana	Tamil	Deva Mahadeva Mamu Brovumu Siva	R. Sudarsanam & R. Govardhanam			N. T. Rama Rao
1958	Baktha Ravana	Tamil	Iraivaa Vaa Varan Thaa	R. Sudarsanam & R. Govardhanam			N. T. Rama Rao
1958	Bhookailasa	Kannada	Jeya Jeya Mahadeva..... Bhaktha Vatsala	R. Sudarsanam & R. Govardhanam	Ku Ra See		Rajkumar
1958	Bhookailasa	Kannada	Deva Deva Thava	R. Sudarsanam & R. Govardhanam	Ku Ra See		Rajkumar
1958	Bhookailasa	Kannada	Tharave Varadaanaa	R. Sudarsanam & R. Govardhanam	Ku Ra See		Rajkumar
1958	Sampoorna Ramayanam	Tamil	Indru Poi Naalai Vaaraai	K. V. Mahadevan	A. Maruthakasi		T. K. Baghvathi
1958	Sampoorna Ramayanam	Tamil	Sangeetha Soubhagyame	K. V. Mahadevan	A. Maruthakasi		T. K. Baghavathi
1958	Sampoorna Ramayanam	Tamil	Thennadudiya Sivane Potri.... Kanpaarum	K. V. Mahadevan	A. Maruthakasi		T. K. Baghavathi
1958	Sampoorna Ramayanam	Tamil	Thavamuni Viswamithran	K. V. Mahadevan	A. Maruthakasi		Echo Song
1958	Thanga Padhumai	Tamil	Aarambamae Avathu Kannukulae	Viswanathan–Ramamoorthy	Pattukkottai Kalyanasundaram	Padmini (dialogues)	Sivaji Ganesan
1958	Vanjikottai Valiban	Tamil	Amma Amma	C. Ramchandra	Kothamangalam Subbu		Echo Song
1958	Avan Amaran	Tamil	Aniyayam Indha Ulagile	T. M. Ibrahim	A. Maruthakasi		Echo Song
1958	Kathavarayan	Tamil	Vidhiya Sadhiya	G. Ramanathan	Thanjai N. Ramaiah Dass		Sivaji Ganesan
1958	Annaiyin Aanai	Tamil	Kollathe Idhu Pole Pollatha Ulagame	S. M. Subbaiah Naidu	A. Maruthakasi	A. P. Komala	Echo Song
1958	Kaathavaraayan	Tamil	Vidhiyaa Sadhiyaa	G. Ramanathan	Thanjai N. Ramaiah Dass		Echo Song
1959	Manaiviye Manithanin Manickam	Tamil	Annam Aval Nadai Karpana	S. Hanumantha Rao	Kannadasan		K. Balaji
1959	Manaiviye Manithanin Manickam	Tamil	Bothai Tharum Sugatthil	S. Hanumantha Rao	Kannadasan		K. Balaji
1959	Manaiviye Manithanin Manickam	Tamil	Vetri Vandha Podhum	S. Hanumantha Rao	Kannadasan		K. Balaji
1959	Manaiviye Manithanin Manickam	Tamil	Kannil Pirandhu Vandha	S. Hanumantha Rao	Kannadasan		K. Balaji
1959	Orey Vazhi	Tamil	unknown	R. Govardhanam	Kannadasan		Echo Song
1959	Ponnu Vilayum Bhoomi	Tamil	Kudumba Vandi Kudukudu Endru	K. H. Reddy	Thiruchi Thiyagarajan		Echo Song
1959	Pennkulathin Ponvilakku	Tamil	Maalai Itta Mangai.... Needhi Onnu Thalaikku Mele	Master Venu	Villiputhan		Echo Song
1960	Sivagangai Seemai	Tamil	Vaigai Perugi Vara	Viswanathan–Ramamoorthy	Kannadasan	P. Leela	
1960	Deivapiravi	Tamil	Anbalae Thediya En	R. Sudarsanam	Udumalai Narayana Kavi	S. Janaki	Sivaji Ganesan
1960	Deivapiravi	Tamil	Thanaithanae Nambathathu	R. Sudarsanam	Udumalai Narayana Kavi		Echo Song
1960	Paavai Vilakku	Tamil	Aayiram Kann Pothathu	K. V. Mahadevan	A. Maruthakasi		Sivaji Ganesan
1960	Paavai Vilakku	Tamil	Kaviyama Nenjil Oviyama	K. V. Mahadevan	A. Maruthakasi	P. Susheela	Sivaji Ganesan
1960	Paavai Vilakku	Tamil	Mangiyathor Nilavinilae	K. V. Mahadevan	Mahakavi Bharathiyar		Sivaji Ganesan
1960	Paavai Vilakku	Tamil	Vannathamizh Pennoruthi	K. V. Mahadevan	A. Maruthakasi	L. R. Eswari	Sivaji Ganesan
1960	Thangarathinam	Tamil	Chandanap Pothikaiyin	K. V. Mahadevan	Ku. Sa. Krishnamurthy		S. S. Rajendran
1960	Kuravanji	Tamil	Kadhal Kadal Karai	T. R. Pappa	Kannadasan	P. Susheela & P. Leela	Sivaji Ganesan
1960	Kuravanji	Tamil	Nee Sollavidil Yaar	T. R. Pappa	Ku. Sa. Krishnamurthy		Sivaji Ganesan
1960	Kuravanji	Tamil	Thanneeril Meen Irukkum.... Unakku Puriyuthu Enakku Puriyuthu	T. R. Pappa	Kannadasan	P. Leela	Sivaji Ganesan
1960	Kuravanji	Tamil	Padi Alappen Endru	T. R. Pappa	Ra. Krittinamurthi		Sivaji Ganesan
1960	Kuravanji	Tamil	Sengkayal Vandu	T. R. Pappa	Rasappa Kavirayar	P. Leela, A. P. Komala & A. G. Rathnamala	Sivaji Ganesan
1960	Kuravanji	Tamil	Aalaiyitta Karumbaagi	T. R. Pappa	Thanjai N. Ramaiah Dass		Sivaji Ganesan
1960	Raja Desingu	Tamil	Sarasa Raani Kalyaani	G. Ramanathan	Thanjai N. Ramaiah Dass	P. Bhanumathi	MGR
1960	Raja Desingu	Tamil	Iyalodu Isaipole	G. Ramanathan		P. Bhanumathi	MGR
1960	Petra Manam	Tamil	Kadhal Karumbu Kandaen	S. Rajeswara Rao	Kannadasan	Jikki	
1960	Kalathur Kannamma	Tamil	Sirithalum Azhuthalum Nilai Ondruthaan	R. Sudarsanam	Kannadasan		Echo Song
1960	Ellorum Innaattu Mannar	Tamil	Pinju Manadhil.... Kodi Kodi Uyirgal Vandhu	T. G. Lingappa	Pattukottai Kalyanasundaram		Echo Song
1960	Naan Kanda Sorgam	Tamil	Thaamarai Kannaaa Kann Kadal Vannaa	G. Aswathama	T. K. Sundara Vadhyar		P. V. Narasimha Bharathi
1961	Mamiyarum Oru Veetu Marumagale	Tamil	Selvamelaam Kodukkum Thirumagalaam	Pendyala Nageswara Rao	A. Maruthakasi		
1961	Mamiyarum Oru Veetu Marumagale	Tamil	Pillai Kutti Petruviddaal	Pendyala Nageswara Rao	A. Maruthakasi		
1961	Mamiyarum Oru Veetu Marumagale	Tamil	Bhudhdhiyum Vandhathaa Sollu	Pendyala Nageswara Rao	A. Maruthakasi		
1962	Ellorum Vazhavendum	Tamil	Aarambamae Inikum Manathu	Rajan–Nagendra	Villiputhan	Mohana	M. R. Radha
1962	Ellorum Vazhavendum	Tamil	Vichithirame Manithan Charithirame	Rajan–Nagendra	Villiputhan		
1963	Kaanchi Thalaivan	Tamil	Velga Naadu Velga Naadu	K. V. Mahadevan	M. Karunanidhi		Echo Song
1965	Poomalai	Tamil	Ulagame Ethirthaalum....Penne Un Gathi Idhuthana 1	R. Sudarsanam	Mayavanathan		Echo Song
1965	Poomalai	Tamil	Ulagame Ethirthaalum....Penne Un Gathi Idhuthana 2	R. Sudarsanam	Mayavanathan		Echo Song
1972	Yaar Jambulingam	Tamil	Nallavar Kaiyil Nanayam	T. R. Pappa			Echo Song
?	?	Tamil	Kariyathil Kai Veiyada				

== General references ==
- Rangan, Baradwaj (19 March 2016). "A musical bridge across eras". The Hindu. Kasturi & Sons.
