= Or Iravu =

1951 film by P. Neelakantan

- Poster
- Directed by: P. Neelakantan
- Screenplay by: C. N. Annadurai; P. Neelakantan
- Based on: Or Iravu by C. N. Annadurai
- Produced by: A. V. Meiyappan
- Starring: K. R. Ramasamy; Lalitha
- Cinematography: S. Maruti Rao
- Edited by: K. Shankar
- Music by: R. Sudarsanam
- Production company: AVM Productions
- Release date: 11 April 1951
- Running time: 160 minutes
- Country: India
- Language: Tamil

Or Iravu (transl. One Night) is a 1951 Indian Tamil-language film directed by P. Neelakantan and co-written by him and C. N. Annadurai. Produced by AVM Productions, it is based on Annadurai's play of the same name. The film stars K. R. Ramasamy, reprising his role from the play. It was released on 11 April 1951 and received well by critics, but failed commercially.

== Plot ==
A thief breaks into a rich man's house without knowing that the man is his father who had abandoned him and his mother long ago.

== Cast ==
Male cast

- K. R. Ramasamy as Rathnam
- T. K. Shanmugam as Karunakarathevar
- T. S. Balaiah as Jagaveeran
- A. Nageswara Rao as Dr. Sekhar
- T. S. Durairaj as Compounder 'Eman'
- 'Friend' Ramasami as Agarathi
- S. Venkatraman as Rioter
- N. S. Narayana Pillai as Kanaka Pillai
- Duraisami as Thatha
- T. S. Dakshinamurthy as Public Prosecutor

Female cast

- Lalitha as Susheela
- B. S. Saroja as Swarnam
- Muthulakshmi as Bhavani
- Angamuthu as Maid
- Sukumari (debut film)

Dance

- Lalitha-Padmini
- Kumari Kamala
- Lakshmikantham

Choreographers

- Vazhuvoor Ramaiah Pillai
- B. Hiralal

== Production ==
Or Iravu was a stage play written by C. N. Annadurai. It was originally written for K. R. Ramasamy's Krishnan memorial drama company by Annadurai. A. V. Meiyappan of AVM Productions decided to make a film based on the play. Annadurai was paid ₹10,000 for writing the screenplay. Annadurai went to AVM studios and wrote the entire script and dialogues totalling 300 pages in a single night. The screenplay was later modified by the director and the producer of the film. This was the third film to be made based on Annadurai's plays after Velaikari (1949) and Nallathambi (1949). P. Neelakantan, who had begun working for AVM in the 1947 film Naam Iruvar as assistant director, made his directorial debut with this film. Per Annadurai's recommendation, Ramasamy was hired to play the hero, reprising his role from the play. The play depicted events that happen in a single night, and older incidents were depicted using flashbacks, but in the film version, flashbacks were replaced with a linear narration. The completed film was 14,980 feet in length.

== Soundtrack ==
The music was composed by R. Sudarsanam ("Thunbam Nergaiyil Yaazhedutthu" is based on a composition by Dandapani Desikar). The song "Ayya Saami Aaoji Saami" is based on "Chico Chico from Puerto Rico" from the 1945 American film Doll Face.

Songs list

Song	Singers	Lyrics	Length
"Vasandha Mullaiyum Malligaiyum"	M. S. Rajeswari	K. P. Kamatchi Sundharam	03:20
"Puvimel Maanamudan...Pennaaga Pirandhaale"	T. S. Bagavathi	Ku. Ma. Balasubramaniyam	03:23
"Kottu Murase Kottu Murase"	K. R. Ramasamy, M. S. Rajeswari & V. J. Varma	Mahakavi Bharathiyar	02:38
"Ayyaa Saami Avoji Saami"	M. L. Vasanthakumari	K. P. Kamatchi Sundharam	03:08
"Thunbam Nergaiyil Yaazhedutthu"	M. S. Rajeswari & V. J. Varma	Bharathidasan	03:28
"Enna Ulagamadaa Idhu Ezhaikke Naragamadaa"	K. R. Ramasamy	K. P. Kamatchi Sundharam	04:35
"Arumbu Pol Meesai...Paartthu Paartthu Kanngal Rendum"	V. J. Varma, T. S. Bagavathi & M. S. Rajeswari	K. P. Kamatchi Sundharam	06:06
"Boologam Thanai Kaana Varuveer"	M. L. Vasanthakumari & T. S. Bagavathi	T. K. Shanmugam	05:12
"Padutthurangum Podhu...Akkam Pakkam Yaarum Illai"	M. S. Rajeswari	K. P. Kamatchi Sundharam	03:51
"Azhagu Naadu...Engal Naadu Idhu Engal Naadu"	T. S. Bagavathi	T. K. Shanmugam	03:40

== Release and reception ==
Or Iravu was released on 11 April 1951. The film was a box office failure, but was received well by critics and contemporary writers of Annadurai. Meiyappan theorised that the film failed either due to the modifications made to the original script or the changes the director did to adapt it for the big screen.

== Bibliography ==
- Rajadhyaksha, Ashish; Willemen, Paul (1998) [1994]. Encyclopaedia of Indian Cinema. British Film Institute and Oxford University Press. ISBN 0-19-563579-5.
