= Jupiter Pictures =

Indian feature film production company

- Type: Limited
- Industry: Film
- Founded: 1935
- Founder: M. Somasundaram (Jupiter Somu), S. K. Moidheen
- Defunct: 1983
- Headquarters: Coimbatore and Chennai, India
- Area served: South India
- Products: Motion pictures

Jupiter Pictures (Tamil: ஜுபிடர் பிக்ச்சர்ஸ்) was an Indian feature film production company founded in Coimbatore in 1934 by M. Somasundaram (popularly known as "Jupiter Somu") and S.K. Mohideen. Jupiter Pictures was a major production house with 46 releases, including 36 films released in Tamil, 5 in Telugu, 2 each in Kannada and Hindi and one joint release in Tamil and Telugu. In the late 1940s and early 1950s, they operated out of Central Studios in Coimbatore. Following the closure of the studio, they relocated to Madras (now Chennai) and took over Neptune Studio in Adayar which would later become Sathya Studios. In Madras, the Jupiter Pictures office operated from a leased historic and palatial building in Mylapore known as "Mangala Vilas".

A. S. A. Sami directed most of his films under the Jupiter Pictures banner. In Madras during the 1950s and 60s, Jupiter produced many successful films, such as "Manohara" (1954, directed by L.V. Prasad), "Karpukkarasi" (1957, A. S. A. Sami), "Thangapathumai" (1959, Sami), "Ellorum Innattu Mannar"(1960, Tatineni Prakasha Rao), "Arasilankumari" (1961, Sami). Jupiter Pictures films made with other producers were sometimes less popular. In its later years the company was managed by S.K. Habibullah (son of S.K. Mohideen).

== Filmography ==
Year	Film	Language	Director	Music Direcror	Notes
1935	Menaka	Tamil	P. K. Raja Sandow	T. K. Muthusamy	Released in Sri Shanmuganandha Talkie Company
1936	Chandrakantha	Tamil	P. K. Raja Sandow		
1938	Anaadhai Penn	Tamil	Raghupathi Surya Prakash		
1942	Kannagi	Tamil	M. Somasundaram & R. S. Mani	S. V. Venkatraman	Highest grossing Film of the year
1943	Kubera Kuchela	Tamil	R. S. Mani	Kunnakudi Venkatarama Iyer	One of Highest grosser
1944	Mahamaya	Tamil	T. R. Raghunath	S. V. Venkatraman & Kunnakudi Venkatarama Iyer	
1946	Sri Murugan	Tamil	M. Somasundaram & V. S. Narayanan	S. V. Venkatraman & S. M. Subbaiah Naidu	One of the highest grossing Film of the year
1946	Vidyapathi	Tamil	A. T. Krishnasami	Adeppalli Rama Rao	
1947	Kanjan	Tamil	Covai A. Aiyamuthu & T. R. Gopu	S. M. Subbaiah Naidu	
1947	Rajakumari	Tamil	A. S. A. Sami	S. M. Subbaiah Naidu	One of the highest grossing Film of the year and made M. G. Ramachandran as star
1948	Abhimanyu	Tamil	M. Somasundaram & A. Kasilingam	S. M. Subbaiah Naidu & C. R. Subburaman	
1948	Mohini	Tamil	Lanka Sathiyam	S. M. Subbaiah Naidu & C. R. Subburaman	
1949	Kanniyin Kathali	Tamil	K. Ramnoth	S. M. Subbaiah Naidu & C. R. Subburaman	cinematic debut of Kannadasan; Madhuri Devi in dual role, 1 role disguised as male
1949	Velaikari	Tamil	A. S. A. Sami	S. M. Subbaiah Naidu & C. R. Subburaman	C. N. Annadurai's first film
1950	Krishna Vijayam	Tamil	Sundar Rao Nadkarni	S. M. Subbaiah Naidu & C. S. Jayaraman	T. M. Soundararajan's first film
1950	Vijayakumari	Tamil	A. S. A. Sami	C. R. Subburaman & C. S. Jayaraman	
1951	Kaithi	Tamil	S. Balachander	S. Balachander	
1951	Marmayogi	Tamil	K. Ramnoth	S. M. Subbaiah Naidu & C. R. Subburaman	Highest grosser of the year & one of M. G. Ramachandran's successful movie
1951	Stree Sahasam	Tamil	Vedantam Raghavayya	C. R. Subburaman	Distributor Only
1951	Stree Sahasam	Telugu	Vedantam Raghavayya	C. R. Subburaman	Distributor Only
1951	Sudharshan	Tamil	A. S. A. Sami & Sundar Rao Nadkarni	G. Ramanathan	Distributor Only
1952	Rani	Hindi	L. V. Prasad	C. R. Subburaman & D. C. Dutt	
1952	Rani	Tamil	L. V. Prasad	C. R. Subburaman & D. C. Dutt	
1952	Zamindar	Tamil	P. V. Krishnan	G. Ramanathan	Produced with Sangeetha Pictures
1953	Azhagi	Tamil	Sundar Rao Nadkarni	P. R. Mani	
1953	Inspector	Tamil	R. S. Mani	G. Ramanathan	
1953	Inspector	Telugu	R. S. Mani	G. Ramanathan	
1953	Manithan	Tamil	K. Ramnoth	S. V. Venkatraman	
1953	Naam	Tamil	A. Kasilingam	C. S. Jayaraman	Produced with Mekala Pictures
1954	Manohara	Hindi	L. V. Prasad	S. V. Venkatraman & T. R. Ramanathan	Produced under Manohar Pictures
1954	Manohara	Tamil	L. V. Prasad	S. V. Venkatraman & T. R. Ramanathan	Produced under Manohar Pictures
1954	Manohara	Telugu	L. V. Prasad	S. V. Venkatraman & T. R. Ramanathan	Produced under Manohar Pictures
1954	Sorgavasal	Tamil	A. Kasilingam	Viswanathan–Ramamoorthy	Produced under Parimalam Pictures
1955	Santosham	Telugu	C. P. Deekshith	Viswanathan–Ramamoorthy	Remake of Velaikari
1957	Karpukkarasi	Tamil	A. S. A. Sami	G. Ramanathan	
1958	Kanniyin Sabatham	Tamil	T. R. Raghunath	T. G. Lingappa	
1959	Amudhavalli	Tamil	A. K. Sekar	Viswanathan–Ramamoorthy	
1959	Thanga Padhumai	Tamil	A. S. A. Sami	Viswanathan–Ramamoorthy	
1960	Ellarum Innattu Mannar	Tamil	T. Prakash Rao	T. G. Lingappa	
1961	Arasilankumari	Tamil	A. S. A. Sami	G. Ramanathan	
1963	Valmiki	Telugu	C. S. Rao	Ghantasala	
1963	Valmiki	Kannada	C. S. Rao	Ghantasala	
1964	Marmayogi	Telugu	B. A. Subba Rao	Ghantasala	
