= Kudumbam (1954 film) =

- Directed by: Jampana
- Screenplay by: M. S. Subramaniam; A. L. Narayanan
- Story by: Jampana
- Starring: Sri Ram; G. Varalakshmi
- Music by: Pendyala Nageswara Rao
- Production company: Jampana Nandi Productions
- Release date: 1954
- Country: India
- Language: Tamil

Kudumbam (transl. Family) is a 1954 Indian Tamil-language film directed by Jampana. The film stars Sri Ram and G. Varalakshmi.

== Plot ==
Dharmalingam is a clerk in a pawn shop. His wife is Seetha and they have a son, Rajendran. Dharmalingam finds it difficult to meet ends with his meagre salary. Seetha's father Veeraiah visits them and realises the family's financial problems. He tells his daughter Seetha that he wants Rajendran, when he grows up, to marry his grand-daughter Sarada. ie: his son Ramanna's daughter. Veeraiah takes Rajendran with him. Ramesh is the son of a Zamindar. One day he cleverly steals a diamond necklace from the pawn shop. Dharmalingam is charged with the theft and sent to jail. Seetha takes refuge with her brother Ramanna. Though Ramanna and father Veeraiah are sympathetic towards her, Ramanna's wife Kamatchi ill-treats her. Seetha goes away with son Rajendran and lives a simple life in a hut. Rajendran grows up and joins a college. Sarada also now grown up and joins the same college. They meet and fall in love with each other. Ramesh returns from abroad after studies. Dharmalingam is released from jail and he goes to work as a domestic aid in Ramesh's house. He waits for a chance to take revenge. Kamatchi is trying to marry daughter Sarada to Ramesh as he is a rich man. Ramesh learns about the love affair between Rajendran and Sarada and gets furious. How things are sorted out forms the rest of the story.

== Cast ==
List adapted from the song book.

Male Cast

- Sri Ram as Rajendran
- K. A. Thangavelu as Veeraiah
- T. S. Durairaj as Ramanna
- C. H. Narayana Rao as Dharmalingam
- T. K. Ramachandran as Ramesh
- T. V. Radhakrishnan as Singaram
- C. D. Kannabhiran as Sekar

Female cast

- G. Varalakshmi as Seetha
- K. Savithri as Sarada
- M. R. Santhanalakshmi as Lakshmi
- T. P. Muthulakshmi as Meena
- C. K. Saraswathi as Kamatchi

== Production ==
The film was produced by Jambana Nandhi Productions and was directed by Jampana. M. S. Subramaniam and A. L. Narayanan wrote the story and dialogues. The film was produced in Telugu also with the title Menarikam.

== Soundtrack ==
Music was composed by Pendyala Nageswara Rao and the lyrics were penned by M. S. Subramaniam. Playback singers are M. L. Vasanthakumari, P. A. Periyanayaki, P. Leela, Jikki, Ssheela, Ghantasala, Rajah, T. M. Soundararajan, M. S. Rama Rao and Nageswara Rao.

Song	Singer/s	Duration (m:ss)
"Pandigai Dhinamithadah"	M. L. Vasanthakumari	
"Naalidhuve Nan Naalidhuve"	A. M. Rajah	
"Azhuthu Azhuthu Sorndha"	P. Leela	
"Ulagile Thanimanithanukku Unavum"		
"Kanneeril Un Kathaiyum"		
"Pagaliravum Paaraamal"		
"Paartheeraa Ivar Sarasam"	Ghantasala & P. Leela	03:11
"Yeh Kutti Ennai"	Nageswara Rao & P. Susheela	
"Ambuli Maamaa Shokku Paarka"	A. M. Rajah & Jikki	03:11
"Anandamey Anandam"	Jikki	
"Pudhumalar Roja Naaney"	P. A. Periyanayaki	
