= Vijayakumari (film) =

- Theatrical release poster
- Directed by: A. S. A. Sami
- Written by: A. S. A. Sami
- Produced by: M. Somasundaram
- Starring: K. R. Ramasamy; T. R. Rajakumari
- Cinematography: Masthan; W. R. Subba Rao
- Edited by: D. Durairaj
- Music by: C. R. Subburaman
- Production company: Jupiter Pictures
- Release date: 18 March 1950
- Country: India
- Language: Tamil

Vijayakumari is a 1950 Indian Tamil language film written and directed by A. S. A. Sami. The film stars K. R. Ramasamy and T. R. Rajakumari. It was released on 18 March 1950.

== Plot ==
This is the story of a young man who works to bring changes in the society by destroying corruption and superstitious beliefs. The story is set in a kingdom that had a wily minister. The princess falls in love with the young man, but the minister wishes to marry her to his son. The young man and his sister are tormented by the minister.

== Cast ==
List adapted from The Hindu article.

Male cast

- K. R. Ramasamy as Vijayan
- Serukalathur Sama as Prime Minister
- T. S. Balaiah as Son of Prime Minister
- M. N. Nambiar as the brother of a fisherwoman
- R. Balasubramaniam
- K. R. Ramsingh as an amputated Wizard
- Pulimoottai Ramasami
- K. Sayeeram

Female cast

- T. R. Rajakumari as the Princess
- Kumari Kamala as Sister of Vijayan
- P. K. Saraswathi as Maya, Queen of an island
- K. S. Angamuthu
- M. S. S. Bhagyam as a fisherwoman

Dance

- Vyjayanthimala
- Lalitha-Padmini

== Production ==
This is a historical film, but almost like a folklore film, produced by M. Somasundaram under the banner Jupiter Pictures. After the success of Velaikkaari, the producer encouraged A. S. A. Sami to bring out another film with a similar theme. Sami created the character of a young man with revolutionary ideas and the same hero K. R. Ramasamy was featured in the role.

== Soundtrack ==
Music was composed by C. R. Subburaman and C. S. Jayaraman. The film had 14 songs, some of them of Western style. The dance song "Laalu Laalu" became popular. As a boy, A. L. Raghavan was introduced by Jayaraman and sang in a girl's voice for Kumari Kamala in this film.

Song	Singer/s	MD	Lyrics	Length
"Laalu Laalu"	A. P. Komala		K. D. Santhanam	02:39
"Vaa Vavvaa Kittey Vaa Vavvaa"	A. P. Komala, Pulimoottai Ramasamy		K. D. Santhanam	03:14
"Geethaanandham Perinbam"	M. L. Vasanthakumari, P. Leela	C. S. Jayaraman	Udumalai Narayana Kavi	04:59
"Katchi Yaavaiyum"	K. R. Ramasamy, T. R. Rajakumari and A. L. Raghavan	C. S. Jayaraman	Udumalai Narayana Kavi	
"Pandrimalai Panimamalai"	A. P. Komala, K. V. Janaki		Udumalai Narayana Kavi	02:34
"Kondaadum Subathiname"	T. V. Rathnam, P. Leela		Udumalai Narayana Kavi	03:03
"Pozhuthu Vidinthaal"	T. R. Rajakumari		Udumalai Narayana Kavi	03:00

== Reception ==
Film historian Randor Guy wrote in 2009 that the film did not do well commercially because of its complicated story.
