= Inspector (1953 film) =

1953 film by R. S. Mani

- Theatrical release poster
- Directed by: R. S. Mani
- Screenplay by: Na. Somasundaram
- Based on: Inspector by TKS Brothers
- Produced by: M. Somasundaram; S. K. Mohideen
- Starring: T. K. Shanmugam; S. Balachander; T. K. Bhagavathi; Anjali Devi
- Cinematography: Nemai Gosh
- Edited by: K. Govindasamy
- Music by: G. Ramanathan
- Production company: Jupiter Pictures
- Release date: 31 July 1953
- Running time: 192 minutes
- Country: India
- Language: Tamil

Inspector is a 1953 Indian Tamil language drama film directed by R. S. Mani. It is an adaptation of the play of the same name by the TKS Brothers. The film stars T. K. Shanmugam, S. Balachander, Anjali Devi and P. K. Saraswathi. It was released on 31 July 1953.

== Plot ==
A police inspector helps a young man who is a classmate of his sister. The young man is a kind person and he moves like one in the family. The inspector's sister falls in love with the young man. She wants to learn dancing and the young man arranges a dance master to teach her. But the dance master is an opportunist and he seduces the girl and she becomes pregnant. The inspector and his wife wants to marry her to the young man without knowing her pregnancy. However, the young man is in love with a village lass. The dance master sees the village beauty and sets his roving eyes on her. He rejects the responsibility for the pregnancy of the young woman. How all these problems are settled forms the rest of the story.

== Cast ==
List Compiled from the database of Film News Anandan and from the Hindu review article.

Male cast

- T. K. Shanmugam
- S. Balachander
- T. K. Bhagavathi
- S. A. Natarajan
- T. N. Sivathanu
- M. R. Santhanam
- M. S. Karuppaiah
- Master K. N. Krishnan
- K. N. Venkataraman
- A. Ganesh Singh
- T. V. Jayaraman

Female cast

- Anjali Devi
- M. S. Draupathi
- P. K. Saraswathi
- S. R. Janaki
- K. Rathinam
- Bhoodevi
- C. R. Rajakumari (Dance)

== Production ==
Inspector was adapted from the TKS Brothers play of the same name. It was produced by M. Somasundaram and S. K. Mohideen under the banner Jupiter Pictures and was directed by R. S. Mani. N. Somasundaram wrote the screenplay and dialogues. Nemai Gosh was in charge of photography while the editing was done by K. Govidasamy. Art direction was by Thanu and the choreography was handled by K. S. Ramasami, Hiralal and V. Madhavan. Still photography was done by R. N. Nagaraja Rao. The film was shot at Neptune Studios, Adyar, Chennai and processed at the Jupiter laboratory. The film was also produced in Telugu.

== Soundtrack ==
Music was composed by G. Ramanathan while the lyrics were penned by Ku. Ma. Balasubramaniam, Ku. Sa. Krishnamoorthy, T. K. Sundara Vathiyar, A. Maruthakasi and Ka. Mu. Sheriff.

Song	Singer/s	Lyricist
"Aasaiyai Maunamaayi Pesidum"	(Radha) Jayalakshmi	
"Unnaiyallaal Thunai Yaaramma"	(Radha) Jayalakshmi	
"Vandu Moikaadha Koondhal"	M. V. Swaminathan	
"Varuvaayi Mana Mohanaa"	V. N. Sundaram & M. L. Vasanthakumari	
"Moodiyirundha En Vizhiyinul"	M. L. Vasanthakumari	Ku. Ma. Balasubramaniam
"Madhana Singaara Neelaa"	M. L. Vasanthakumari	
"Uruvaagumunne Kulaindhae"	A. M. Rajah & Jikki	
"Thuyar Soozhndha Vaazhvile"	Jikki	T. K. Sundara Vathiyar

== Reception ==
Unlike the play, the film adaptation was a commercial failure.
