= Nagore E. M. Hanifa =

Indian politician & Islamic singer

Member of the Tamil Nadu Legislative Council
- In office 1 April 1957 – 25 February 1967
- Chairmen: P. V. Cherian (1952-64); M. A. Manickavelu Naicker (1964-70)

Personal details
- Born: Esmail Mohammed Hanifa; 25 December 1919 Ramanathapuram Tamil Nadu, India
- Died: April 8, 2015 (aged 95) Chennai, India
- Party: Dravida Munnettra Kazhagam
- Spouse: Roshan Begam
- Children: 6
- Occupation: Singer, Politician

Nagore Esmail Mohammed Hanifa (25 December 1919 – 8 April 2015) was a Tamil Muslim lyricist, playback singer and politician. He was known as Isai Murasu for his deep stentorian voice.

== Early life ==
Esmail Mohammed Hanifa, born on 25 December 1919 in Vellipattinam, Ramanathapuram district, Tamil Nadu. His father Mohammed Ismail Rowther was from Nagore and his mother was from Ramanathapuram. his maternal great-grandfather Muthu Rowther was a Armory Custodian and Guardian of the Kingdom of Ramnad.

== Politics and cinema ==
Hanifa, who spent his early childhood in his mother’s hometown of Ramanathapuram, later went to work for his paternal uncle Abu Bakr Rowther in Tiruvarur. It was during this period, in his early teenage years, that he struck up a friendship with Muthuvel Karunanidhi, who was gaining a reputation for oratory even as a schoolboy Nagore Hanifa penned many devotional songs independently which are widely used in Tamil Nadu, during festivals and marriages. During the 1950s the songs which he sang for Dravida Munnetra Kazhagam (DMK) boosted the fortunes of the party. He was also a film playback singer. Iraivanidam Kaiyenthungal is very well known song from him among all the Tamils. It was written by Kiliyanur, (near Mayiladuthurai) R. Abdul Salam. The lyrics are beyond any specific religion. It is liked by not only Muslims but Hindus and Christians, even today sung by many singers on stages. He is considered one of the greatest and most influential singers of South India and beyond.

Year	Film	Language	Song title	Music director	Co-singer
1954	Sorgavasal	Tamil	Aagum Neriyedhu	Viswanathan–Ramamoorthy	K. R. Ramasamy
1955	Gulebakavali	Tamil	Naayagamae Nabi Naayagamae	Viswanathan–Ramamoorthy	S. C. Krishnan
1961	Paava Mannippu	Tamil	Ellorum Kondaduvom	Viswanathan–Ramamoorthy	T. M. Soundararajan
1992	Chembaruthi	Tamil	Kadalilae Thanimaiyile	Ilaiyaraaja	Mano
1993	Dharma Seelan	Tamil	Engumulla Allah	Ilaiyaraaja	S. P. Balasubrahmanyam
1997	Raman Abdullah	Tamil	Un Madhama En	Ilaiyaraaja	
1997	Vallal	Tamil	Etti Uthachathamma	Deva	
1999	Endrendrum Kadhal	Tamil	Nadodi Nanba Pogaadhe	Manoj Bhatnagar	P. Unnikrishnan & K. S. Chithra
2002	Kamarasu	Tamil	Oru Muraithaan Indha Vaazhkaiye	S. A. Rajkumar	

During the 1970s, he was the member of the now-defunct Tamil Nadu Legislative Council.

== Death ==
He died on 8 April 2015, aged 95 .
