= Naam (1953 film) =

- Theatrical release poster
- Directed by: A. Kasilingam
- Screenplay by: M. Karunanidhi
- Based on: Kaadhal Kanneer by Kashi
- Starring: M. G. Ramachandran; V. N. Janaki
- Cinematography: G. K. Ramu
- Edited by: A. Kasilingam
- Music by: C. S. Jayaraman
- Production companies: Jupiter Pictures; Mekala Pictures
- Release date: 5 March 1953
- Country: India
- Language: Tamil

Naam (transl. Us) is a 1953 Indian Tamil-language film directed by A. Kasilingam and written by M. Karunanidhi, starring M. G. Ramachandran and V. N. Janaki. It is based on Kaadhal Kanneer (transl. Tears of Love), a novel by Kashi. Jointly produced by Jupiter Pictures and Mekala Pictures, the film was released on 5 March 1953 and failed commercially.

== Plot ==
Kumaran learns from his dying mother that he is the heir to a zamindari estate. However, the will and other important documents that show his entitlement to the estate are hidden by Malayappan, who wants to claim the property for himself. A doctor named Sanjeevi is also interested in the estate and hopes his daughter will marry Kumaran to secure it. Despite their plans, Kumaran is in love with Meena, Malayappan’s sister.

When Meena gets hold of the will, Kumaran begins to suspect her motives and decides to leave the village. He moves to the city and becomes a boxer, building a new life for himself. Meanwhile, Malayappan sets fire to Kumaran’s house, and everyone believes Kumaran has died. In reality, Meena had saves him from the fire, keeping him alive.

Complications continue over the missing will. At the same time, a disfigured boxer starts roaming around at night, causing villagers to spread rumors of a ghost. Eventually, all secrets are revealed - Kumaran is actually the mysterious boxer. Kumaran and Meena overcome the obstacles to their love and are finally reunited.

== Cast ==
- M. G. Ramachandran as Kumaran
- V. N. Janaki as Meena
- P. S. Veerappa as Malayappan
- M. N. Nambiar
- M. G. Chakrapani as Sanjeevi
- P. K. Saraswathi as Sanjeevi's daughter
- S. R. Janaki
- R. M. Sethupathi
- S. M. Thirupathisami
- T.M. Gopal
- M. Jayashree
- A. C. Irusappan
- Sandow M. M. A. Chinnappa Thevar

== Production ==
Naam was jointly produced by Jupiter Pictures and Mekala Pictures. The partners of Mekala included M. Karunanidhi, M. G. Ramachandran and V. N. Janaki. Karunanidhi wrote the screenplay, dialogue and lyrics, based on Kaadhal Kanneer, a novel by Kashi. Despite this, Karunanidhi was credited for the story in the posters. Ramachandran, then not the popular icon that he would later become, spelt his name onscreen as "Ramachandar" because he thought it sounded "stylish", and wanted to differentiate himself from the already established actor T. R. Ramachandran.

== Soundtrack ==
The music was composed by C. S. Jayaraman, with lyrics written by Karunanidhi.

Song title	Singers	Length
"Pesum Yaazhe Pennmaane"	A. M. Rajah, Jikki	02:49
"Edhaiyum Thaangum Idhayam"	C. S. Jayaraman	02:59
"Pesum Yaazhe Pennmaane"	Jikki	03:08
"Paappaa Eppodhum Bayame"	C. S. Jayaraman, T. R. Gajalakshmi	02:56
"Maari Magamaayi Maari Magamaayi"	K. R. Chellamuthu, A. P. Komala	03:06
"Laalaala.... Kannaatti Karumbe"		00:43
"Aahaa Varuvaai Varuvaai"	K. R. Chellamuthu	01:41

== Release ==
Naam was released on 5 March 1953, and failed commercially. Historian Aranthai Narayanan theorised that, one reason for the film's underperformance was lack of "DMK political mix" that fans expected after the success of Karunanidhi's Parasakthi, released the year before.
