= Kanniyin Sabatham =

1958 film by T. R. Raghunath

- Poster
- Directed by: T. R. Raghunath
- Story by: V. Sadasivabrahmam; A. K. Velan
- Produced by: M. Somasundaram; A. L. Srinivasan
- Starring: K. R. Ramasamy; Anjali Devi
- Cinematography: R. Sampath
- Edited by: K. Govindaswamy
- Music by: T. G. Lingappa
- Production company: Jupiter Pictures
- Distributed by: Jupiter Pictures
- Release date: 10 January 1958
- Country: India
- Language: Tamil

Kanniyin Sabatham (transl. Vow of the Virgin) is a 1958 Indian Tamil-language film directed by T. R. Raghunath and produced by M. Somasundaram and A. L. Srinivasan. The film stars K. R. Ramasamy, Anjali Devi and M. N. Nambiar.

== Cast ==
Adapted from the database of Film News Anandan:

Male cast

- K. R. Ramasamy
- M. N. Nambiar
- K. A. Thangavelu
- T. S. Durairaj
- Javar Seetharaman

Female cast

- Anjali Devi
- M. N. Rajam
- Rajasulochana
- Sandhya

== Production ==
Kanniyin Sabatham was directed by T. R. Raghunath and was produced by M. Somasundaram and A. L. Srinivasan under the banner Jupiter Productions. Sadasiva Brahmam and A. K. Velan wrote the story while the dialogues were written by Kannadasan. Editing was handled by K. Govindasamy. Saiyad Ahamed was in charge of art direction. Still photography was done by Venkatachari and the film was made at Neptune and Revathi studios.

== Soundtrack ==
The music was composed by T. G. Lingappa.

Track listing

Song	Singers	Lyrics	Length
"Aattatthil Sirandhadhu Pitthalaattam"	M. L. Vasanthakumari & Soolamangalam Rajalakshmi	Thanjai N. Ramaiah Dass	04:29
"Pattaachi Kai"	P. Leela	Kannadasan	03:22
"Appadi Paartthaalum"	A. P. Komala	Kannadasan	03:11
"Solla Theriyaamal"	M. L. Vasanthakumari	Kannadasan	03:17
"Manmadhanai Sivaperuman"	Sirkazhi Govindarajan, A. G. Rathnamala & group	Kannadasan	
"Deeyo Deeyo Deeyo Vannamayil Aadudhu"	Jikki	A. Maruthakasi	03:10
"Naadalum Raajaa Neeye"	P. Leela	A. Maruthakasi	03:10
"Pallam Medu Ulla Paadhaiyile"	K. R. Ramasamy	Pattukkottai Kalyanasundaram	03:08

== Release ==
Kanniyin Sabatham was released on 10 January 1958. It received a "U" (universal) certificate from the censor board after seven cuts.
