= Illara Jothi =

- Theatrical release poster
- Directed by: G. R. Rao; T. R. Sundaram (supervisor)
- Story by: Kannadasan
- Produced by: T. R. Sundaram
- Starring: Sivaji Ganesan; Padmini; Sriranjani
- Cinematography: G. R. Rao
- Edited by: L. Balu
- Music by: G. Ramanathan
- Production company: Modern Theatres
- Release date: 9 April 1954
- Country: India
- Language: Tamil

Illara Jothi (transl. The Light of the House) is a 1954 Indian Tamil-language film, directed by G. R. Rao and produced by Modern Theatres. The film stars Sivaji Ganesan, Padmini and Sriranjani. It was released on 9 April 1954.

== Plot ==
Manohar is an under appreciated poet and playwright. He is married to Kaveri, a kind hearted personality who cannot match Manohar's intellect. During his travails he is found by Chitra, a connoisseur of fine arts and drama. She encourages Manohar to become a published author and refers him to her contacts. Manohar achieves dramatic success, money flows in to his life, his lifestyle changes and he spends a lot of time with Chitra neglecting Kaveri. After some struggles he realises Kaveri is ready to let go of him and sacrifice her love for him. He realises his selfishness in this drama and apologises to both Kaveri and Chitra, finally making up with Kaveri.

== Cast ==
Cast according to the opening credits and the song book.

Male cast

- Sivaji Ganesan as Manohar
- Thangavelu as Nettilingam
- K. K. Perumal as Professor
- Thirupathisami as Savadhan Pillai
- M. N. Krishnan as Monk
- Ashokan as Mohan
- Rama Rao as Ameena
- Sethupathi as Unani Doctor
- Kottapuli Jayaraman as Story Seer
- Kittan as Publishing Boss
- Soundar as Rajaman Singh
- Raju

Female cast

- Padmini as Chitrakekha
- Sriranjani as Kaveri
- C. K. Saraswathi as Anantha
- Kamalam as Lakshmi

Dance

- Chandra-Kamala

== Production ==
Anarkali-Salim drama appeared in a dance-song sequence in this film. Kannadasan had claimed in his autobiography that M. Karunanidhi had plagiarised his script, when he (Kannadasan) was serving a jail sentence for his activism as a group leader for the Kallakudi demonstration. The song book, however, does not include Karunanidhi's name for his contribution.

== Soundtrack ==
The music was composed by G. Ramanathan. Lyrics were by Kannadasan.

Song	Singers	Length
"Kalangamillaa Kaadhalile"	A. M. Rajah & Jikki	02:01
"Siruvizhi Kurunagai"	P. Leela	03:31
"Annam Polum...Paar Paar Paar Indha Paravayai Paar"	Swarnalatha	03:09
"Unakkum Enakkum Uravu Kaatti"	Jikki	02:50
"Chittu Pole Vaanagam"	Jikki	03:00
"Ketpadhellam Kaadhal Geedhangale"	P. Leela	04:08
"Kalyaana Vaiboga Naale"	Jikki	03.00
"Pennillaa Oorile Pirandhu"	Jikki	03:20
"Kangal Irandil Onru Ponal"	S. J. Kantha	03:34
"Kalai Thenoorum Kanni Thamizh"	A. M. Rajah & P. Leela	04:10
