= Thuli Visham =

- Theatrical release poster
- Directed by: A. S. A. Sami
- Screenplay by: A. S. A. Sami
- Story by: Sandilyan
- Produced by: V. L. Narasu
- Starring: K. R. Ramasamy; Sivaji Ganesan; Krishna Kumari
- Cinematography: M. Masthan
- Edited by: R. Ramamurthi
- Music by: K. N. Dandayudhapani Pillai
- Production company: Narasu Studios
- Distributed by: SR Pictures
- Release date: 30 July 1954
- Country: India
- Language: Tamil

Thuli Visham (transl. A Drop of Poison) is a 1954 Indian Tamil-language film, directed by A. S. A. Sami. The film stars K. R. Ramasamy, Sivaji Ganesan and Krishna Kumari. It was released on 30 July 1954.

== Cast ==
Adapted from the song book and the opening credits.

Male cast

- K. R. Ramasamy as Chandran
- Sivaji Ganesan as Suryakanthan
- S. V. Ranga Rao as Veeramarthandan
- Mukkamala as Malaiyaman
- D. V. Narayanasami as Jayankonda Thevar
- T. V. Radhakrishnan as Karumbu
- Kottapuli Jayaraman as Sivakozhundu
- Pottai Krishnamoorthi as Kothandam
- K. Natarajan as Prime Minister

Female cast

- Krishna Kumari as Nagavalli
- P. K. Saraswathi as Angayarkanni
- S. D. Subbulakshmi as Maha Devi
- T. P. Muthulakshmi as Pooncholai
- Reeta as Murali

Dance

- Kerala Sisters

== Soundtrack ==
The music was composed by K. N. Dandayudhapani Pillai. Lyrics were by K. P. Kamatchi Sundharam.

Song	Singers	Length
"Vaazhvadharkendre Pirandhom"	K. R. Ramasamy	02:31
"Ennai Ariyaamal Varugudhu"	T. V. Rathnam & V. J. Varma	03:08
"Sammadhittahal Endrum Sandhoshame"	K. R. Ramasamy & Soolamangalam Rajalakshmi	03:37
"Neengal Varavendum Dhuraiyae"	T. V. Rathnam	02:20
"Vinnile Thavazhum Madhi"	K. R. Ramasamy	
"Nandraaga Vaazha Vendum"	M. L. Vasanthakumari	04:09
"Manamilla Malarukkor Magimai Illai"	P. Leela & A. G. Rathnamala	01:28
"Man Meedhile Ilam Penn Maanikkam"	V. J. Varma	02:27
