= Kangkanam =

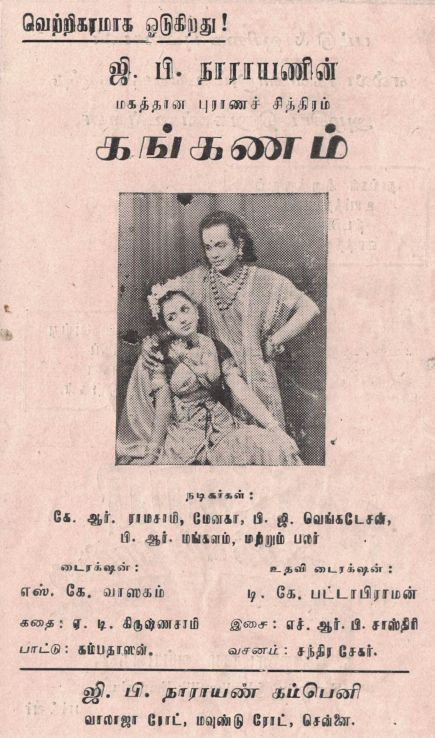
- Directed by: S. K. Vasagan
- Written by: Chandrasekhar
- Story by: A. T. Krishnaswamy
- Produced by: G. P. Narayanan
- Starring: K. R. Ramasamy; Menaka; P. G. Venkatesan; P. R. Mangalam
- Music by: H. R. Padmanabha Sastry
- Production company: G. P. Narayanan Company
- Release date: 10 June 1948
- Running time: 176 mins
- Country: India
- Language: Tamil

Kangkanam (Note: Transliteration of Tamil according to international standard ISO 15919:2001:kaṅkaṇam meaning a string tied around the wrist taking a vow) is a 1948 Indian Tamil language film directed by S. K. Vasagan. The film was censored in November 1947 but was released in 1948. K. R. Ramasamy, Menaka and P. G. Venkatesan featured in the lead roles.

== Cast ==
The following list is adapted from the database of Film News Anandan

Male cast

- K. R. Ramasamy
- P. G. Venkatesan
- M. R. Swaminathan
- Narendranath

Female cast

- Menaka
- Leela
- P. R. Mangalam

== Production ==
The film was produced by G. P. Narayanan under his own banner G. P. Narayanan and Company and was directed by S. K. Vasagan. A. T. Krishnaswamy wrote the story while the dialogues were penned by Chandrasekar.

== Soundtrack ==
Music was composed by H. R. Padmanabha Sastry and the lyrics were penned by Kambadasan.

This was the debut film for the playback singer P. Leela.
