= Needhipathi =

- Directed by: A. S. A. Sami
- Screenplay by: A. S. A. Sami
- Based on: Needhipathi by M. S. Solaimalai
- Produced by: N. S. Thiraviyam
- Starring: K. R. Ramasamy; Gemini Ganesan; Rajasulochana; K. Malathi; S. V. Sahasranamam; M. N. Rajam; T. S. Balaiah
- Cinematography: R. R. Chandran; Rajabahadur
- Edited by: P. V. Narayanan
- Music by: Viswanathan–Ramamoorthy
- Production company: Vijaya Films
- Release date: 7 October 1955
- Running time: 172 minutes
- Country: India
- Language: Tamil

Needhipathi (transl. Judge) is a 1955 Indian Tamil language film directed by A. S. A. Sami. The film stars K. R. Ramasamy, Gemini Ganesan, Rajasulochana and M. N. Rajam. It was simultaneously shot in Telugu as Anna Thammudu. The film is based on the play of the same name by M. S. Solaimalai.

== Cast ==
- K. R. Ramasamy
- Gemini Ganesan
- T. S. Balaiah
- S. V. Sahasranamam
- D. Balasubramaniam
- Yadhartham Ponnusamy Pillai
- C. S. Pandian
- M. K. Mustapha
- Karikol Raj
- S. V. Shanmugam
- V. S.. Nadesan
- Sankaramurthi
- M. S. Karupiah
- T. K. Gopal
- Rajagopal
- Ponnusamy
- C. V. Velappan
- Veerasamy
- T. A. Natarajan
- Rajasulochana
- M. N. Rajam
- K. Malathi
- T. D. Kusalakumari
- E. V. Saroja
- L. Vijayalakshmi
- P. Dhanam
- Renganayagi
- P. S. Muthulakshmi
- Seethalakshmi

== Soundtrack ==
Music was composed by the duo Viswanathan–Ramamoorthy assisted by G. K. Venkatesh. As per film credits, Gajalakshmi and S. J. Kantha also lent their voices for a group song.

Song	Singer/s	Duration (m:ss)	Lyricist
"Aanandhame Aanandam"	T. V. Rathnam, N. L. Ganasaraswathi	03:41	A. Maruthakasi
"Vanthadhadi Rajayogam"	K. Jamuna Rani & Group	03:01	A. Maruthakasi
"Thaayum Seyum Pirindhathai Paar"	C. S. Jayaraman	06:57	A. Maruthakasi
"Thaayum Seyum" (Short version)	C. S. Jayaraman		A. Maruthakasi
"Unmaiyaana Uravu"	C. S. Jayaraman		A. Maruthakasi
"Annan Thambi"	C. S. Jayaraman		A. Maruthakasi
"Aneedhiyaale"	C. S. Jayaraman		A. Maruthakasi
"Anbe Nam Deivam"	T. V. Rathnam	03:24	A. Maruthakasi
"Uruvam Kandu Yen Manasu"	K. R. Ramasamy & T. M. Soundararajan	03:16	A. Maruthakasi
"Jilu Jiluvena Jolikkum"	K. R. Ramasamy	03:31	Udumalai Narayana Kavi
"Varuvaar Varuvaarendru" (Music Drama)	K. R. Ramasamy, Gajalakshmi & S. J. Kantha	06:16	Udumalai Narayana Kavi
"Parakudhu Paar Pori"	K. R. Ramasamy & A. P. Komala	03:36	Kannadasan
