= Senthamarai (film) =

1962 film by A. Bhimsingh

- Theatrical release poster
- Directed by: A. Bhimsingh
- Screenplay by: A. Bhimsingh
- Story by: Rama. Arangannal
- Produced by: A. L. Srinivasan
- Starring: Sivaji Ganesan; Padmini
- Cinematography: G. Vittal Rao; M. Karnan
- Edited by: A. Bhimsingh; A. Paul Duraisingh; R. Thirumalai
- Music by: Viswanathan–Ramamoorthy
- Production company: Chitra Productions
- Distributed by: Madras Pictures
- Release date: 14 September 1962
- Country: India
- Language: Tamil

Senthamarai (/sɛnðɑːməraɪ/ transl. Red Lotus) is a 1962 Indian Tamil-language film, directed by A. Bhimsingh. The film stars Sivaji Ganesan, Padmini, K. R. Ramasamy and S. S. Rajendran. It was released on 14 September 1962. No complete print of the film is known to survive, making it a partially lost film.

== Cast ==
- Sivaji Ganesan as Chandran
- Padmini as Senthamarai
- K. R. Ramasamy as Lawyer
- S. S. Rajendran
- Lalitha
- Ragini
- J. P. Chandrababu
- K. A. Thangavelu
- B. R. Panthulu

== Soundtrack ==
The music was composed by Viswanathan–Ramamoorthy.

Song	Singers	Lyrics	Length
"Povirukku Vandirukku"	T. M. Soundararajan & P. Susheela	K. D. Santhanam	03:58
"Paadamaatten Naan Paadamaatten"	K. R. Ramasamy	Kannadasan	03:57
"Kanave Kaadhal Vaazhve"	G. K. Venkatesh	K. D. Santhanam	03:28
"Maargazhi Thingal Madhi Niraindha"	P. Leela	Andal Thiruppaavai	02:44
"Thaangadhamma Thaangaadhu"	J. P. Chandrababu & K. Jamuna Rani	Kannadasan	03:24
"Vaaranam Aayiram Soozha Valam Seidhu"	P. Leela, L. R. Eswari & L. R. Anjali	Andal Thiruppaavai	03:58
"Senthamizh Suvai Mevum"	P. Susheela	Kannadasan	02:28
"Ponnai Thedi Varuvaar"	Jikki, L. R. Eswari & L. R. Anjali	Kannadasan	02:31
"Ponnedutthu Seidhu Vaiththa"	P. Leela, L. R. Eswari & L. R. Anjali	Kannadasan	02:43

== Reception ==
Playing on the film's title meaning red lotus, Kanthan of Kalki caustically called it "Kakidha Poo" (paper flower).

== Production ==
The song "Vaaranam Aayiram Soozha Valam Seidhu" was shot on the previous night of Padmini's actual Wedding which was scheduled at Guruvayur Temple. Tamil film history lore prevails now that the 'Paadamaaten - Naan Paadamaaten' song, sung by singer-actor K.R. Ramaswamy had become a 'self-flaggelation' item for his career. In Tamil, this belief is called 'aram paaduthal', and poets, lyricists and singers are scared of. Once this song was released, K.R. Ramaswamy's career as a singer-actor had a sliding downfall, from which he failed to recover.
