= Rajathi =

Rajathi is a given name. Notable people with the name include:

- Rajathi, known by the stage name Indraja, Indian actress
- Rajathi Kunchithapatham, Indian politician
- Rajathi Salma (born 1968), Tamil writer, activist, and politician

== See also ==
- Rajathi Rojakili, Tamil film
