= Avan Amaran =

1958 film by S. Balachander

- Poster
- Directed by: S. Balachander
- Written by: Nagercoil S. Nagarajan
- Produced by: Nagercoil S. Nagarajan; So.Kanapati
- Starring: K. R. Ramasamy
- Cinematography: Nemai Ghosh
- Music by: T. M. Ibrahim
- Production company: People's Films
- Release date: 23 May 1958
- Running time: 199 minutes
- Country: India
- Language: Tamil

Avan Amaran (transl. He is immortal) is a 1958 Indian Tamil language political drama film produced and written by Nagercoil S. Nagarajan, and directed by S. Balachander. The film stars K. R. Ramasamy, P. Kannamba, Rajasulochana and T. S. Balaiah. It was released on 23 May 1958 and failed at the box office.

== Cast ==
- K. R. Ramasamy as Arul
- P. Kannamba as Arul's mother
- Rajasulochana as Lily
- T. S. Balaiah as Lily's father

== Production ==
Avan Amaran was produced and written by Nagercoil S. Nagarajan under People's Films, and directed by S. Balachander shot at the Newtone, Paramount, and Revathi studios in Chennai. The scene where labourers protest on a bridge was shot at a bridge near Fort St. George, Madras (now Chennai). Cinematography was handled by Nemai Ghosh.

== Soundtrack ==
The soundtrack was composed by T. M. Ibrahim. The song "Kaalanaa Minjaadhaiyaa" is based on "Ramayya Vastavayya" from the Hindi film Shree 420 (1955), and "Vaanmadhi Nee Arivaai" is based on "Jaye To Jaye Kahaan" from another Hindi film, Taxi Driver (1954).

| Song | Singers | Lyricist | Length |
|---|---|---|---|
| "Vaanmadhi Nee Arivaai" | Seerkazhi Govindarajan & Jikki | Ku. Ma. Balasubramaniam | 03:34 |
| "Kanmaniye Innamudhe Karkandu Paage" | Jikki | Ku. Ma. Balasubramaniam | 03:01 |
| "Ezhaiyai Kozhai Endru Ninaikkudhu" | K. R. Ramasamy | Ku. Sa. Krishnamoorthi | 02:22 |
| "Varum Kaalam Ulagam Namadhendre" | Jikki & group | A. Maruthakasi | 03:24 |
| "Kaalanaa Minjaadhaiyaa Kaalanaa Minjaadhaiyaa" | Seerkazhi Govindarajan, A. P. Komala & group | A. Maruthakasi | 03:14 |
| "Aniyaayam Indha Ulagile" | C. S. Jayaraman | A. Maruthakasi | 04:12 |
| "Kanneer Sindhaadhe Kavalai Kollaadhe" | Jikki | A. Maruthakasi | 03:11 |
| "Yezhaigal Vaazhvil...Van Pasiyaale Thudikkiraar Inge" | K. R. Ramasamy | Kuyilan | |
| "Aasiyaavin Jyothiyaaga" | Group song | Kuyilan | |
| "Kanavo Sol Kaadhal" | K. R. Ramasamy & Jikki | Kambadasan | |
| "Dhaam Dhoom Thagatham" | A. M. Rajah & A. P. Komala | Surabhi | |

== Release ==
Avan Amaran was released on 23 May 1958, delayed from 14 February. As it was a leftist-oriented film there were more than 72 cuts ordered by the censor board and on appeal it was reduced to 52 and after screening it to the then prime minister Jawaharlal Nehru. Finally 35 cuts were approved and censor board certification was given. In this dragging background the film's release was delayed by more than six months. When released there was a severe power cut at Tamil Nadu, then Madras state, and theaters were allowed to run only one show. This toppled the film's success and so it become a failure at the box office.

== Bibliography ==
- Baskaran, S. Theodore (1996). The eye of the serpent: an introduction to Tamil cinema. East West Books. OCLC 243920437.
- Rajadhyaksha, Ashish; Willemen, Paul (1998) [1994]. Encyclopaedia of Indian Cinema. British Film Institute and Oxford University Press. ISBN 0-19-563579-5.
