= A. S. A. Sami =

Indian director and screenwriter

A. S. A. Samy
- Born: Arul Soosai Anthony Samy; 1915; Colombo, Western Province, British Ceylon (now Sri Lanka)
- Died: 1998 (aged 82–83); Tamil Nadu, India
- Education: B.A. (Honours), London
- Occupations: Scriptwriter, director

Arul Soosai Anthony Samy (1915–1998) was an Indian director and screenwriter who worked in Tamil films.

== Early life ==
Born in 1915, A. S. A. Samy was from a devout Catholic family. His father had a business enterprise in Ceylon (now Sri Lanka). He spent his young life there and had his education in Colombo. He received a Bachelor of Arts (Honours) degree from the University of London. He started his career as a teacher in a college in Colombo. He studied literature of both the East and the West and showed a flair for writing plays.

He wrote his first play Bilhanan based on a Sanscrit literature known as Bilhaniyam. He produced the drama that was staged during his college's annual day celebrations.

The family returned to India in the late 1930s.

== Career ==
A. S. A. Samy presented his play Bilhanan to the All India Radio, Tiruchi station and it was accepted for broadcast.

M. K. Thyagaraja Bhagavathar, who was a rising star in Tamil Cinema, at that time played the title role. The radio play became a hit. A Tamil Stage celebrity who happened to listen to this play was T. K. Shanmugam. He owned Bala Shanmuganantha Stage troupe together with his brother. T. K. Shanmugam bought the play from A. S. A. Samy and successfully staged it. Later, in 1948, he adapted it as a film with the same title. A. S. A. Samy wrote the screenplay and dialogues. The film produced by Jupiter Pictures.

Following the success of Bilhanan, A. S. A. Samy became acquainted with M. Somasundaram (Somu) and Mohideen, owners of Jupiter Pictures who at that time were working from Central Studios in Coimbatore.

In 1946, Jupiter Pictures produced two films, Valmiki and Sri Murugan. A. S. A. Samy wrote the screenplay and dialogues for both these films. M. G. Ramachandran was a monthly paid actor in Jupiter Pictures. He performed a dance with another actress K. Malathi. The Siva – Parvati dance was well received.

During the shooting of Sri Murugan, M. G. R. and Samy became friends. M. G. R. addressed A. S. A. Samy as Annae (elder brother) as Samy was senior to him. Samy addressed M. G. R. by his name, Ramachandran. He continued to address him by name till the end. It is said that A. S. A. Samy is the only person who addressed M. G. R. by his name.

In 1947, Samy scripted a Raja-Rani story and presented it to M. Somasundaram. Somu was impressed by the story and asked A. S. A. Samy to write the screenplay and dialogues. He also appointed Samy as the Director. Somu wanted to book P. U. Chinnappa and T. R. Rajakumari for the lead roles. A. S. A. Samy did not want to experiment with star actors in the first movie he is going to Direct. He suggested M. G. R. and Malathi for the lead roles.

Samy appointed M. Karunanidhi, then an aspiring young man in his twenties, to write the screenplay and dialogues. Rajakumari was a success film.

In 1949, he directed C. N. Annadurai's Velaikari film.

A. S. A. Samy was active till the end of 1960s. His last film as director, Thirumagal, was released in 1971.

== Filmography ==
=== As director ===
- Thirumagal (1971)
- Maya Sundari (Hindi) (1967)
- Veeragangai (1964)
- Anandha Jodhi (1963); co-directed with V. N. Reddy
- Aasai Alaigal (1963)
- Kadavulai Kanden (1963)
- Muthu Mandapam (1962)
- Arasilankumari (1961)
- Kaithi Kannayiram (1960)
- Kalyanikku Kalyanam (1959)
- Thanga Padhumai (1959)
- Karpukkarasi (1957)
- Dingiri Menike (Sinhala) (1956)
- Needhipathi (1955)
- Thuli Visham (1954)
- Oka Talli Pillalu (1953)
- Ponni (1953)
- Sudharshan (1951)
- Vijayakumari (1950)
- Velaikkaari (1949)
- Rajakumari (1947)

== Felicitation ==
During M. Karunanidhi's Cinema Golden Jubilee celebrations held at Marina Beach, Chennai, he was honoured by Karunanidhi who had by then become the Chief Minister of Tamil Nadu. On the occasion, Karunanidhi said Samy was his teacher in script writing.

A. S. A. Samy was appointed Principal of the Script and Direction Department in the Tamil Nadu Cinema Training College. When Samy was suffering from paralysis, Karunanithi arranged a payment of ₹100,000 to be paid from the Murasoli Trust.
