= Vaira Maalai =

- Theatrical release poster
- Directed by: N. Jagannath
- Based on: Vaira Maalai by Thottakara Viswanathan
- Produced by: A. C. Pillai; Sri Patha Shankar
- Starring: R. S. Manohar; Padmini; Ragini; K. A. Thangavelu
- Cinematography: P. L. Rai; H. S. Venu
- Edited by: N. M. Shankar
- Music by: Viswanathan–Ramamoorthy
- Production company: Vaidhya Films
- Release date: 25 September 1954
- Country: India
- Language: Tamil

Vaira Maalai (transl. Diamond Necklace) is a 1954 Indian Tamil-language comedy film starring R. S. Manohar, K. A. Thangavelu, Padmini and Ragini. It is based on the play of the same name by Thottakara Viswanathan.

== Plot ==
Rangasamy and Mohan are college students studying in Chennai. Rangasamy bets 1000 rupees that he will make another college student, Kamala, dance at his birthday party. He goes to Coimbatore with Mohan to get the wager money from his uncle Sambantham. Kamala also goes with them. He has his own house in Coimbatore. But he stays with Mohan and plans to take his mother's diamond necklace for his bet. He meets a girl, Shantha, and falls in love with her. But Shantha's brother Mani takes her away before Rangan makes contact.

Sambantham has rented Rangan's house to Shantha's father Paramasivam. Rangan, without knowing this, goes to his home. There is a lunatic in the house and Rangan get out of the house from the lunatic's clutches. He asks his uncle Sambandam for money. Sambandam tells him to marry Paramasivam's daughter Shantha if he wants the money. Rangasamy does not know that Shantha is the girl whom he had seen earlier and fallen in love. He tells his uncle that he will earn money and then marry Shantha.

In the meantime Kamala sends Mohan disguised as Rangasamy, to Paramasivam's house to see the girl. Shantha's brother Mani disguises himself as a girl and makes Mohan to suffer in the clutches of the lunatic.

Kamala forces Rangasamy for the money and he goes back to his house to take his mother's diamond necklace. Again he gets caught in the clutches of the lunatic. Shantha helps him to escape.

Rangasamy tells Mohan that Shantha the beautiful girl is the Paramasivam's daughter. But Mohan (who was cheated by Mani) says Paramasivam's daughter is like an ape. In order to find the truth, Rangasamy disguised as Kandasamy finds employment as a servant in Paramasivam's house. Shantha suspects him as having come there to steal her diamond necklace.

Paramasivam's elder brother's daughter Kasturi also lives in the same house. Rangasamy befriends Mani and tries to find who is who. Shantha deceives him saying Kasturi is Paramasivam's daughter and she (Shantha) is Paramasivam's elder brother's daughter. The diamond necklace gets lost one day. Shantha suspects Rangasamy and chases him out. She realises that the lunatic only stole the necklace. She writes a letter to Rangasamy begging his pardon and she requests him to come back to the house.

Sambantham and Paramasivam are making arrangements to marry Shantha to Rangasamy. Paramasivam learns that his daughter Shantha is moving closely with Rangasamy who is disguised as Kandasamy. Paramasivam chases Rangasamy out of the house. Meanwhile, Mohan enters the house. Shantha thinks he is Rangasamy. So she runs away to Bangalore with Kandasamy (the real Rangasamy).

Through Mohan, Sambantham learns that Rangasamy has run away. He sends Mohan to bring Rangasamy back. The lunatic informs Paramasivam that his daughter Shantha has run away.

Sambandam and Paramasivam makes arrangements for the marriage in the absence of the bride and groom.

Paramasivam complains to the police that Kandasamy has stolen the diamond necklace.

Sambandam adopts Mohan as his son. Paramasivam 'buys' Kamala and makes her his daughter.

What happens Rangasamy and Shantha forms the rest of the story.

== Cast ==
Adapted from The Hindu:

- R. S. Manohar
- K. A. Thangavelu
- Padmini
- Ragini
- K. R. Chellam
- V. S. Raghavan

== Soundtrack ==
Music was composed by the duo Viswanathan–Ramamoorthy.

Song	Singer/s	Lyricist	Length
Senthamarai Kannane	M. L. Vasanthakumari	Kanaga Surabi	02:55
Aanum pennum Serndhu padicha	Jikki	Kannadasan	
Vanjamidho Vaanchaiyile	Thiruchi Loganathan, M. L. Vasanthakumari	Kanaga Surabi	03:02
Koovamal koovum Gokilam	Thiruchi Loganathan, M. L. Vasanthakumari	Kannadasan	03:25
Nadana Kala Rani (Dance Drama)	P. Leela, A. P. Komala, G. K. Venkatesh	Kannadasan	
Unnai ennum podhe	M. L. Vasanthakumari	Kuyilan	02:49

== Reception ==
Historian Randor Guy noted that, unlike the source play, the film adaptation was not well received.
