= Sugam Enge =

- Poster
- Directed by: K. Ramnoth
- Story by: A. K. Velan; Kannadasan
- Starring: K. R. Ramasamy; Savitri
- Cinematography: W. R. Subbha Rao
- Edited by: L. Balu
- Music by: Viswanathan–Ramamoorthy
- Production company: Modern Theatres
- Release date: 9 September 1954
- Running time: 150 minutes
- Country: India
- Language: Tamil

Sugam Enge (transl. Where is Happiness?) is a 1954 Indian Tamil-language romantic drama film, directed by K. Ramnoth and produced by Modern Theatres. The script was written by A. K. Velan and Kannadasan and the music composed by Viswanathan–Ramamoorthy. The film stars K. R. Ramasamy and Savitri. It was released on 9 September 1954.

== Cast ==
- K. R. Ramasamy as Velan
- Savitri as Veni
- P. S. Veerappa as Nagappan
- K. A. Thangavelu as Kannayiram
- R. Balasubramaniam as Velan's Father
- T. K. Ramachandran as Pandi Durai
- S. V. Subbaiah as Boopathy
- Chandrababu as Panjatcharam
- T. P. Muthulakshmi as Maragatham
- S. Rama Rao as Setji
- O. A. K. Thevar as Public Prosecutor
- K. Natarajan as Judge
- K. K. Soundar as Inspector

== Soundtrack ==
Music was composed by Viswanathan–Ramamoorthy .

Song	Singers	Lyrics	Length
"Sendhamizh Naattu Solaiyile"	K. R. Ramasamy & Jikki	A. Maruthakasi	03:17
"Sugam Enge Sugam Enge"	K. R. Ramasamy		03:23
"Kannil Thondrum Kaatchi Yaavum"	K. R. Ramasamy & Jikki	Kannadasan	03:05
"Kannai Kavarum Azhagu Valai"	K. R. Ramasamy A. P. Komala	A. Maruthakasi	03:02
"Samyuktha Mini Drama...Magaraani Naaninimael"			03:16
"Raasi Palan"			
"Onnaa Rendaa Edhu"	K. R. Ramasamy		
"Gangai Nadhi Dheeratthile"			
"Sandhosham Vaenum"			
"Maiyal Konda Mannaa"			
"Sendhamizh Naattu Solaiyile"	K. R. Ramasamy & Jikki	A. Maruthakasi	01:48

== Controversy ==
There was a misunderstanding between Kannadasan and M. Karunanidhi with allegations that Sugam Enge had plagiarised Karunanidhi's Ammaiyappan. It was eventually declared that Sugam Enge was not based on Ammaiyappan, but a popular folk tale.
