= Poompavai =

1944 film by Krishnan–Panju

- Theatrical release poster
- Directed by: T. Balaji Singh; Krishnan–Panju (unc.)
- Screenplay by: A. A. Somayajulu
- Story by: Kambadasan
- Starring: K. R. Ramaswamy; U. R. Jeevarathnam
- Cinematography: Purushotham
- Edited by: S. Panju
- Music by: Addepalli Rama Rao
- Production company: Leo Films
- Distributed by: Kandhan & Co. Sri Chaya & Co.
- Release date: 11 August 1944
- Country: India
- Language: Tamil

Poompavai (/puːmpɑːvaɪ/) is a 1944 Indian Tamil-language film directed by T. Balaji Singh and the duo Krishnan–Panju in the latter's directorial debut. Produced under the banner of Leo Films, it features K. R. Ramaswamy, U. R. Jeevarathnam, K. Sarangapani, K. R. Chellam and S. V. Sahasranamam. The film was released in August 1944 and became a success.

== Plot ==
Poompavai is the daughter of Sivanesan Chettiar, a jeweller based in Mylai. Her cruel stepmother Ponnammal despises her and plots against her. Poompavai devotes herself to worshipping the Hindu god Shiva. One day, Shiva appears before her father in the guise of a sadhu, and gives him a ruby, which he decides to embed in a crown that the chieftain of Mylai has ordered him to make. But to his dismay, Sivanesan realises that his daughter has already given the ruby to a sadhu seeking alms. The chieftain refuses to believe this, and banishes Sivanesan and his family.

The banished family meet Thirugnanar Sambandar, a saint to whom Poompavai is attracted. However, he orders her not to indulge in such desires and instead seek divine knowledge. After learning of Sambandar's powers, the chieftain of Mylai forgives Sivanesan's family and reinstates them. Not too long after, Poompavai dies after being bitten by a snake. A shocked Sivanesan rushes to Sambandar, who successfully resurrects her. Poompavai again asks him to marry her, but Sambandar says that having given her life, she is now like a daughter to her. Instead, he gives her divine knowledge, so she becomes his devotee.

== Cast ==
Male cast

- K. R. Ramaswamy as Thirugnanar Sambandar
- K. Sarangapani as Sivanesan Chettiar
- T. R. Ramachandran as Elelasingan
- Sahasranamam as Lord Shiva
- M. R. Durairaj as Sivapadahrithayar
- K. P. Jayaraman as Fat Chetty
- D. Balasubramaniam as Mylai Chieftain
- N. S. Krishnan as Papavinasam Chetty

Female cast

- U. R. Jeevarathnam as Poompavai
- K. R. Chellam as Ponnammal
- T. K. Pushpavalli as Mylai Chieftess
- A. R. Sakunthala as Majari
- T. A. Mathuram as Kamakshi

Dance

- V. S. Susheela Devi
- T. M. Papa
- A. R. Sakunthala
- M. J. Andal

== Production ==
Poompavai was based on the folk story of the girl of the same name. Produced by Leo Films, it marked the directorial debut of the duo Krishnan–Panju (R. Krishnan and S. Panju) who were also in charge of the general supervision. But the director's credit was given to T. Balaji Singh instead. Besides co-directing, Panju also edited the film. The audiography was done by E. I. Jeeva. Purushotham was the cinematographer and the film was shot at Newtone Studios, Kilpauk. Kambadasan wrote the story while A. A. Somayajulu wrote the dialogues. V. B. Ramaiah Pillai and Nataraj were the dance choreographers.

== Soundtrack ==
The music was composed by Addepalli Rama Rao and the lyrics were written by Madurai Mariappa Swamigal and Kambadasan. Songs like "Kalam Veen Pogudhe" (sung by Jeevarathnam) and "Om Namasivayam" (sung by Ramaswamy) became popular.

Song	Singer	Ragam	Lyrics	Length
"Thodudaiya Seviyan"	K. R. Ramasamy	Thodi	Kambadasan	
"Pitham Konndam Namakku"	Sahasranamam	Nadanamakriya	Kambadasan	
"Gangaiyinal Thangakkudam Nirumpum"	T. R. Ramachandran, A. R. Sakunthala	Mishrakam	Kambadasan	
"Varumanthalir Meni"	U. R. Jeevarathnam	Reethigowlam	Madurai Mariappa Swamigal	02:30
"Kastapattu Sambhadhicha Dharu"	N. S. Krishnan, T. A. Mathuram	Bageswari	Kambadasan	
"Vasamigum Malargal"	U. R. Jeevarathnam	Mand	Madurai Mariappa Swamigal	02:39
"Chinna Vayathile Kanni Thamizhile"	N. S. Krishnan & Party	Nadanamakriya	Kambadasan	
"Om Namasivayam Enave"	K. R. Ramasamy		Madurai Mariappa Swamigal	02:58
"Kalam Veen Pogudhe Kadhalane Guha"	U. R. Jeevarathnam	Sindhu Bhairavi	Madurai Mariappa Swamigal	02:47
"Om Namasivaya Enum Namam"	K. R. Ramasamy	Bihag	Kambadasan	
"Thennadudaya Sivane ... Kannikkaiyai Etru"	U. R. Jeevarathnam	Devagandhari	Madurai Mariappa Swamigal	02:50
"Nanendrannavam Thonungal"	K. R. Ramasamy	Sindhu Bhairavi	Kambadasan	
"Mandhiram Aavadhu Neeru Vanavar Meladhu Neeru"	K. R. Ramasamy	Kanada	Thirugnana Sambandar	00:36
"Aadidum Menmalar Pada"	U. R. Jeevarathnam	Kambodhi	Madurai Mariappa Swamigal	03:20
"Podhum Podhum Indha Janmam"	U. R. Jeevarathnam	Sivaranjani	Madurai Mariappa Swamigal	03:00
"Kulirnthu Than Nijamanal Udala Ulama"	Oracle	Bhairavi	Kambadasan	
"Sivamadhe Mudhan Maiyana Deivam"	K. R. Ramasamy	Bihag	Kambadasan	
"Mattitta Punnaiyanganan"	K. R. Ramasamy	Bhimpalas	Kambadasan	
"Sivasiva Siva Sankarane"	K. R. Ramasamy, U. R. Jeevarathnam, Chorus	Brindavana Saranga	Kambadasan	
"En Mele Dhenum Kopama"	T. A. Mathuram		Kambadasan	
"Monathile Varum Gnanam"	U. R. Jeevarathnam		Madurai Mariappa Swamigal	03:05

== Release and reception ==
Poompavai was released on 11 August 1944 in select theatres, and had a wider release a week later. The film was distributed by Kandhan & Co in Coimbatore, Sri Chaya & Co in Madras, and Mysore Film Corporation in Bangalore, and emerged a box office success. Kay Yess Enn of The Indian Express positively reviewed the film, but criticised its length.
