= K. R. Ramasamy (actor) =

Indian actor and playback singer(1914–1971)

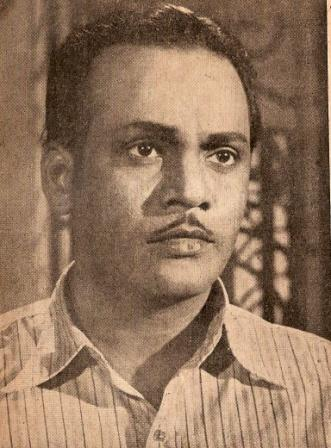
- Born: Kumbakonam Ramabadran Ramasamy; 14 April 1914; Ammachatram
- Died: 5 August 1971 (aged 57)
- Occupations: Actor; Playback singer
- Spouse: Kalyani
- Children: 2

Kumbakonam Ramabadran Ramasamy (14 April 1914 – 5 August 1971), also known by his initials KRR, was an Indian actor and playback singer who worked mainly in Tamil theatre and cinema. He was born in Kumbakonam and was active during the early days of Tamil cinema. He was the first actor who also delved into politics mainly with Dravidar Kazhagam and later with DMK, thus setting a trend for many others to follow.

== Early life ==
K. R. Ramasamy was born on 14 April 1914, as the third child of Ramabadra Chettiar and Kuppammal at Ammachathram near Kumbakonam. He ceased formal education after the fourth grade due to lack of interest, and started taking formal musical training from the Carnatic musician Kumbakonam Rajamanickam Pillai.

== Personal life ==
Ramasamy married Kalyani, his co-star in various plays, and the couple had two children. Ramasamy died of cancer on 5 August 1971.

== Filmography ==
Year	Film	Role	Ref.
1935	Menaka		
1941	Gumasthavin Penn	V. P. Var	
1944	Poompavai	Thirugnana Sambandhar	
1947	Deiva Neethi	Hunter	
1948	Kangkanam		
1948	Bilhana	Bilhana	
1949	Krishna Bhakthi	Krishna	
1949	Velaikkari	Anandan	
1950	Vijayakumari	Vijayan	
1951	Or Iravu		
1952	Kanchana		
1954	Sorgavasal	Madivanna	
1954	Thuli Visham		
1954	Sugam Enge		
1955	Menaka		
1955	Needhipathi	Manickkam	
1955	Chella Pillai	Mani	
1956	Sadhaaram		
1958	Avan Amaran	Arul	
1958	Kanniyin Sabatham		
1959	Thalai Koduthaan Thambi	Inbasekaran	
1962	Ethaiyum Thangum Ithaiyam	Guest Appearance	
1962	Senthamarai	Lawyer	
1966	Nadodi	Neurologist	
1967	Arasa Kattalai		
1969	Nam Naadu		

== Discography ==
Year	Film	Song	Composer	Co-singer
1944	Poompavai	Thodudaiya Seviyan	Addepalli Rama Rao	
1944	Poompavai	Om Namasivayam Enave	Addepalli Rama Rao	
1944	Poompavai	Om Namasivaya Enum Namam	Addepalli Rama Rao	
1944	Poompavai	Mandhiram Aavadhu Neeru	Addepalli Rama Rao	
1944	Poompavai	Sivamadhe Mudhan Maiyana Deivam	Addepalli Rama Rao	
1944	Poompavai	Mattitta Punnaiyanganan	Addepalli Rama Rao	
1944	Poompavai	Sivasiva Siva Sankarane	Addepalli Rama Rao	
1947	Deivaneethi	Nirabaraathi Naane Nijamidhu Thaane	M. S. Gnanmani	
1948	Kangkanam		H. R. Padmanabha Sastry	
1948	Bilhana		Papanasam Sivan	
1949	Krishna Bhakthi	Pennulagilae	S. V. Venkatraman, G. Ramanathan & Kunnakudi Venkatarama Iyer	
1949	Velaikari	Innamum Paaraamugam Enamma	C. R. Subburaman	
1949	Velaikari	Eppadi Vaazhven Ini	C. R. Subburaman	
1949	Velaikari	Neethan Allaamal Thunai Yaar	C. R. Subburaman	
1950	Vijayakumari	Katchi Yaavaiyum	C. R. Subburaman	T. R. Rajakumari & A. L. Raghavan
1951	Or Iravu	Kottu Murase	R. Sudarsanam	M. S. Rajeswari & V. J. Varma
1951	Or Iravu	Enna Ulagamada	R. Sudarsanam	
1951	Or Iravu	Paadi Thiriyum	R. Sudarsanam	
1952	Kanchana	Ullam Kavarndha En	S. M. Subbaiah Naidu	P. A. Periyanayaki
1954	Sorgavasal	Nilave Nilave Aada Vaa	Viswanathan–Ramamoorthy	Soolamangalam Rajalakshmi
1954	Sorgavasal	Nilave Nilave Aada Vaa (pathos)	Viswanathan–Ramamoorthy	
1954	Sorgavasal	Kannithamizh Saalaiyoram Solaiyile	Viswanathan–Ramamoorthy	
1954	Sorgavasal	Aanandam Paarai Kanne	Viswanathan–Ramamoorthy	
1954	Sorgavasal	Samarasa Nilai Arul Sannidhaanam	Viswanathan–Ramamoorthy	
1954	Sorgavasal	Engum Niraivaana Jothiye	Viswanathan–Ramamoorthy	
1954	Sorgavasal	Raajaa Magal Raani	Viswanathan–Ramamoorthy	
1954	Sorgavasal	Engum Inbame Ulagengum Inbame	Viswanathan–Ramamoorthy	
1954	Sorgavasal	Maavodu Thazhuvum Malarkkodi Pole	Viswanathan–Ramamoorthy	P. Leela
1954	Sorgavasal	Enge Sorgam Enge Sorgam	Viswanathan–Ramamoorthy	Nagore E. M. Hanifa
1954	Sorgavasal	Veeram Serindha Mugam	Viswanathan–Ramamoorthy	T. V. Rathnam
1954	Sorgavasal	Engum Niraivaana Jothiye	Viswanathan–Ramamoorthy	
1954	Sorgavasal	Maasillaatha Maamani Manonmani	Viswanathan–Ramamoorthy	M. S. Rajeswari
1954	Sorgavasal	Aagum Neriyedhu	Viswanathan–Ramamoorthy	
1954	Thuli Visham	Samadhithaal Endrum	K. N. Dandayudhapani Pillai	Soolamangalam Rajalakshmi
1954	Thuli Visham	Vaazhvadhakendre Pirandhom Naam	K. N. Dandayudhapani Pillai	
1954	Thuli Visham	Vinnile Thavazhum Madhi	K. N. Dandayudhapani Pillai	
1954	Sugam Enge	Senthamizh Naattu Solaiyile	Viswanathan–Ramamoorthy	Jikki
1954	Sugam Enge	Onnaa Renda Edhu	Viswanathan–Ramamoorthy	
1954	Sugam Enge	Kannai Kavarum Azhagu Valai	Viswanathan–Ramamoorthy	A. P. Komala
1954	Sugam Enge	Kannnil Thondrum Kaatchi Yaavum	Viswanathan–Ramamoorthy	Jikki
1954	Sugam Enge	Sugam Enge Sugam Enge	Viswanathan–Ramamoorthy	
1954	Sugam Enge	Senthamizh Naattu Solaiyile	Viswanathan–Ramamoorthy	Jikki
1955	Menaka	Karpanai Ulagile Soppanam	C. N. Pandurangan & Vedha	
1955	Menaka	Azhagin Dheivam Arivin Sigaram	C. N. Pandurangan & Vedha	Seerkazhi Govindarajan
1955	Menaka	Manam Pola Ini Vaazhalaam	C. N. Pandurangan & Vedha	Radha Jayalakshmi
1955	Menaka	Sugamaana Isaiyaagum Vaazhve	C. N. Pandurangan & Vedha	
1955	Needhipathi	Parakkudhu Paar Pori	Viswanathan–Ramamoorthy	A. P. Komala
1955	Needhipathi	Uruvam Kandu En Manasu	Viswanathan–Ramamoorthy	T. M. Soundararajan
1955	Needhipathi	Jilu Jilunnu Jolikkum Mittaai	Viswanathan–Ramamoorthy	
1955	Needhipathi	Varuvaar Varuvaarendru	Viswanathan–Ramamoorthy	
1955	Chella Pillai	Inbame Neethaan Endhan	R. Sudarsanam	
1955	Chella Pillai	Kaniyum Suvaiyum Servadhupole	R. Sudarsanam	
1956	Sadhaaram	Nal Vaaku Nee Kodadi	G. Ramanathan	
1956	Sadhaaram	Rajaathi Kanee Rajaathi	G. Ramanathan	
1956	Sadhaaram	Villaadhi Villanadaa.... Thullaattam Pottadhellaam	G. Ramanathan	
1958	Avan Amaran	Van Pasiyaale Thudikkiraar Inge	T. M. Ibrahim	
1958	Avan Amaran	Ezhaiyai Kozhai Endru Ninaikkudhu	T. M. Ibrahim	
1958	Avan Amaran	Kanavo Sol Kaadhal	T. M. Ibrahim	
1958	Kanniyin Sabatham	Pallam Medulla Paadhaiyile	T. G. Lingappa	
1962	Ethaiyum Thangum Ithaiyam	Ullam Thedadhe Endru Solludhe	T. R. Pappa	S. Janaki
1962	Ethaiyum Thangum Ithaiyam	Kannum Kannum Kalandhadhanaal	T. R. Pappa	S. Janaki
1962	Senthamarai	Paada Maatten Naan	Viswanathan–Ramamoorthy	

== Bibliography ==
- Rajadhyaksha, Ashish; Willemen, Paul (1998) [1994]. Encyclopaedia of Indian Cinema. British Film Institute and Oxford University Press. ISBN 0-19-563579-5.
