= K. A. Thangavelu =

Indian actor and comedian (1917–1994)

- Born: Karaikal Arunachalam Thangavelu; 15 January 1917; Karaikal, French India (now in Puducherry, India)
- Died: 28 September 1994 (aged 77); Madras (now Chennai), Tamil Nadu, India
- Other name: Danaal Thangavelu
- Occupations: Actor, Comedian
- Years active: 1936; 1951–1994
- Spouse: Rajamani (m. 1943)
- Children: 3
- Relatives: Ashwin (grandson)

Karaikal Arunachalam Thangavelu (15 January 1917 – 28 September 1994) popularly known as "Danaal Thangavelu", was an Indian actor and comedian popular in the 1950s to 1970s. Not known for physical, acrobatic comedy like his contemporaries J. P. Chandrababu and Nagesh, Thangavelu's humour is recognised for his impeccable timing in verbal agility and the characteristic twang of his delivery. He exclusively acted in Tamil films.

== Early life ==
Thangavelu was born on 15 January 1917, in Karaikal, but shifted at an early age to Tirumalairayanpattinam. He was one of three sons of Arunachalam and Karumammal. Due to Arunachalam's alcoholism, the family struggled for food every day. Karumammal died when Thangavelu was six years old, and Arunachalam remarried; Thangavelu's stepmother often abused him. Arunachalam left for Singapore to find better employment and Thangavelu was sent to live with his relatives, but they too abused and ill-treated him. As a child, Thangavelu was a music and theatre fan, often sneaking into halls to watch plays. He eventually joined the Rajambal Company troupe, and was taught acting and mentored originally by Yedhartham Ponnuswamy Pillai, and later by M. Kandaswamy Mudaliar.

== Career ==
Thangavelu spent nine years at Rajambal Company, and after Kandaswamy Mudaliar shifted to the film industry, he too did the same, debuting with a minor, uncredited role in Sathi Leelavathi (1936). Due to lack of success, Thangavelu quit films and survived on alms at a Murugan temple near Kanchipuram until actor M. M. Marappa saw his plight and brought him back into the acting field, this time in theatre. As a result, Thangavelu became more financially stable, and his father also returned to live with him. After a long sabbatical from films, Thangavelu returned to the field in 1951 with Manamagal; director N. S. Krishnan cast him after witnessing several of his stage performances. He followed it up with a comical role in Singari the same year, through which he got the prefix "Danaal" after the often repeated word of his character. Films like Ponvayal and Panam Paduthum Padu (both released in 1954) were instrumental in establishing Thangavelu as a comedian. Throughout his career, Thangavelu acted only in Tamil films.

== Awards ==
- 1968: Received title of Kalaimamani Award by the Government of Tamil Nadu, which is the highest state honour in the field of Arts.
- 1989: Received Kalaivanar award by the Government of Tamil Nadu

== Personal life ==
Thangavelu was originally married to Rajamani. He later married actress M. Saroja who was his pair in more than 50 films. Despite their age difference, they fell in love and married in Madurai Murugan temple during the 100th day celebration of their film Kalyana Parisu. His grandson Ashwin is a television actor.

== Death ==
Thangavelu died on 28 September 1994 at his house in Chennai, Tamil Nadu.

== Partial filmography ==
Year	Film	Role	Ref.
1936	Sathi Leelavathi		
1951	Manamagal		
1951	Singari		
1952	Amarakavi		
1952	Kaliyugam		
1952	Panam		
1953	Anbu		
1953	Thirumbi Paar		
1953	Panakkari		
1954	Illara Jothi		
1954	Suham Engei		
1954	Nanban		
1954	Panam Paduthum Padu		
1954	Ponvayal	Esraj	
1954	Pona Machchan Thirumbi Vanthan		
1954	Vilayattu Bommai		
1954	Vaira Maalai		
1955	Ulagam Palavitham		
1955	Ellam Inba Mayam		
1955	Kathanayaki		
1955	Gulebakavali		
1955	Koteeswaran		
1955	Gomathiyin Kaadhalan		
1955	Chella Pillai		
1955	Maheswari		
1955	Mangaiyar Thilakam		
1955	Methavikal		
1955	Missiamma		
1956	Rambaiyin Kaadhal		
1956	Alibabavum 40 Thirudargalum	Gulam	
1956	Amara Deepam		
1956	Kalam Maripochchu		
1956	Kudumba Vilakku		
1956	Nalla Veedu		
1956	Naga Panchami		
1956	Marma Veeran		
1956	Mathar Kula Manikkam		
1957	Alavudinum Arputha Vilakkum		
1957	Ambikapathi		
1957	Engal Veettu Mahalakshmi		
1957	Karpukkarasi		
1957	Chakravarthi Thirumagal		
1957	Soubakyavathi		
1957	Neelamalai Thirudan		
1957	Bhaktha Markandeya		
1957	Baagyavathi	Shankaran	
1957	Mallika		
1957	Maya Bazaar		
1957	Vanangamudi		
1958	Uthama Puthiran		
1958	Kadan Vaangi Kalyaanam		
1958	Kanniyin Sabatham		
1958	Kathavarayan	General	
1958	Senjulakshmi		
1958	Neelavukku Niranja Manasu		
1958	Boologa Rambai		
1958	Manamulla Maruthaaram		
1958	Mangalya Bhagyam		
1958	Vanji Kottai Valipan		
1958	Pathi Bakthi	Parameswaran Pillai	
1959	Kalyana Parisu		
1959	Thaai Magalukku Kattiya Thaali	Duraiyappan	
1959	Naan Sollum Ragasiyam		
1959	Manjal Mahimai		
1960	Adutha Veettu Penn	Singer	
1960	Anbirkoor Anni		
1960	Irumbu Thirai		
1960	Kadavulin Kuzhandhai		
1960	Kaithi Kannayiram		
1960	Kairasi	Madhu	
1960	Thangam Manasu Thangam		
1960	Thangarathinam		
1960	Deivapiravi		
1960	Naan Kanda Sorgam	Sundar	
1960	Pattaliyin Vetri		
1960	Pudhiya Pathai		
1960	Meenda Sorgam		
1961	Arasilangkumari		
1961	Thirudathe		
1961	Panithirai		
1961	Pasamalar		
1961	Then Nilavu		
1962	Raani Samyuktha		
1962	Azhagu Nila		
1962	Vikramaadhithan		
1962	Parthal Pasi Theerum		
1962	Valar Pirai		
1962	Senthamarai		
1963	Arivaali		
1963	Idhayathil Nee		
1963	Koduthu Vaithaval		
1963	Kattu Roja		
1964	Ullasa Payanam		
1964	Vazhkai Vazhvatharke		
1965	Enga Veetu Pillai		
1965	Enga Veettu Penn		
1965	Vallavanukku Vallavan		
1966	Enga Paappa		
1966	Iru Vallavargal		
1966	Kathal Paduthum Padu	Achu	
1966	Parakkum Pavai		
1966	Petralthan Pillaiya		
1967	Uyir Mel Aasai		
1967	Rajathi		
1967	Pen Endral Pen		
1967	Penne Nee Vaazhga		
1968	Galatta Kalyanam	Dharmalingam	
1968	Thillana Mohanambal		
1968	Kuzhanthaikkaga	Nachi Muthu	
1968	Harichandra		
1969	Nam Naadu		
1969	Gurudhakshaneiy		
1969	Anjal Petti 520		
1970	Vietnam Veedu		
1970	Kann Malar		
1970	Nilave Nee Satchi		
1971	Sumathi En Sundari		
1971	Arutperunjothi		
1973	Amman Arul		
1973	Ponnunjal		
1974	Kalyanamam Kalyanam		
1974	Anbu Thangai		
1981	Karaiyellam Shenbagapoo	Head constable	
1982	Krodham		
1987	Manaivi Ready	Thangappan	
1989	Avathellam Pennale	Naidu	
1994	Periya Marudhu	Vaithiyar	
