= Velaikari =

1949 film by A. S. A. Sami

- Theatrical release poster
- Directed by: A. S. A. Sami
- Written by: C. N. Annadurai
- Based on: Velaikari by C. N. Annadurai
- Produced by: M. Somasundaram
- Starring: K. R. Ramasamy; V. N. Janaki; M. V. Rajamma
- Cinematography: M. Masthan
- Edited by: T. Durairaj
- Music by: C. R. Subbaraman; S. M. Subbaiah Naidu
- Production company: Jupiter Pictures
- Release date: 25 February 1949
- Running time: 186 minutes
- Country: India
- Language: Tamil

Velaikari (transl. Servant Maid) is a 1949 Indian Tamil-language drama film directed by A. S. A. Sami and produced by M. Somasundaram under Jupiter Pictures. It was based on the play of the same name written by C. N. Annadurai, while incorporating plot details from the Alexandre Dumas novel The Count of Monte Cristo (1844). The film stars K. R. Ramasamy, V. N. Janaki and M. V. Rajamma. It was released on 25 February 1949 and became a success. The film was remade in Telugu as Santhosham (1955), in Hindi as Naya Aadmi (1956), and in Kannada as Malli Maduve (1963).

== Plot ==
Vedhachalam Mudaliyar is a rich moneylender. Sarasa and Moorthy are his children. Sarasa takes after her father and behaves arrogantly with the servants. However, Moorthy is good human being and has a soft corner for the maid, Amirtham. Vedhachalam Mudaliar lends money to Sundaram Pillai. Unable to repay the borrowed money and finding it difficult to take Vedhachalam Mudaliar's insults, Sundaram Pillai commits suicide. His son Anandan witnesses the suicide and decides to take revenge on Mudaliar. While he sharpens the knife to kill Mudaliar, his friend Mani, a reformist and intellectual, advises him to sharpen his mind to take revenge. Reformed Anandan, an ardent devotee of Goddess Kali, prays to the Goddess to help him take revenge on Mudaliar. However, Mudaliar becomes wealthier and becomes the owner of another estate, which infuriates Anandan.

Frustrated with the Goddess for helping the rich, Anandan abuses the Goddess at her temple. The devotees get angry with this behaviour of spoiling the sanctity and chase him away. Mani offers shelter to Anandan in a hideout where they find a dead body in a bundle. On close scrutiny, they realise that the body resembles Anandan; they learn from his diary that he is Paramanandam, son of a rich but blind landlady of Mevaar Vilasam. Mani brings Anandan to the village in the guise of Paramanandam. They host a tea party and invite all the rich people, including Mudaliar. As Paramanadham, Anandan soon marries Mudaliar's daughter Sarasa. To take revenge on Mudaliar, Anandan harasses Sarasa and spends their money lavishly. Acting like a drunkard and womaniser, he spoils Mudaliar's reputation in the society.

Discovering the love between Amirtham and Moorthy, Anandan creates a rift between his father-in-law and brother-in-law. Moorthi leaves the house, meets Amirtham and promises to marry her after getting the help of his friend at Madras. However, on realising that he is penniless, Moorthy's friends spurn him. Amirtham's father Murugesan, who is a loyal servant to Mudaliar's family, plans to get her married to an old man to avoid further embarrassment to his master. When Amirtham learns this, she leaves the home on her own. Balu Mudaliar, a rich man who becomes mentally disturbed after the death of his daughter, meets Amirtham. He thinks she is his daughter Sumirdham and provides her shelter at his place. At this doctor's request, Amirtham helps in Balu Mudaliar's recovery, who treats her like his own daughter and permits her to continue to live at his house even after his recovery.

Murthy gets wrong information that Amirtham is dead through her neighbours in the village. Vexed with life and to get peace, he lands in an ashram run by Yogi Hariharadas. However, he soon discovers the yogi's frauds and during an altercation with Moorthi, Yogi dies; Moorthi is accused of the murder and lands in prison. Mudaliar gets disheartened with the mishaps to his children. Mani brings Anandan as a North Indian lawyer to Mudaliar, and Anandan fights Moorthy's case in court.

Arguing beautifully in court, he establishes that, Yogi was a fraud and criminal wanted by the police; the death was not pre-planned or intentional; it happened during self-defence. That court acquits Moorthy and he is released. When Moorthy asks Anandan to name his fee for this great help. Anandan asks Moorthy to Marry Balu Mudaliar's daughter. Moorthy meets Amirtham, who is now known with a different name and is surprised that she looks similar to Amirtham. After the marriage takes place, Anandan reveals to Mudaliar that his son Moorthy has married Amirtham, a servant's daughter, and he (Anandan) is the son of the servant Sundaram Pillai. Berating Mudaliar about his arrogant attitude, money mindedness and treating people badly, he shows how it harmed poor people. Mudaliar regrets his behaviour and mistakes and apologises to Anandan and Amirtham. The family is united.

== Cast ==
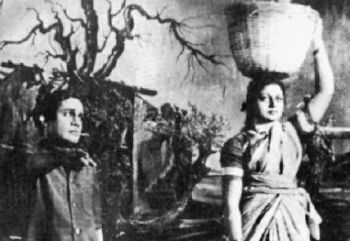
Screenshot from Velaikari

Male cast

- K. R. Ramasamy as Anandan
- T. S. Balaiah as Mani
- M. N. Nambiar as Moorthi and Yogi Hariharadas
- D. Balasubramaniam as Vedhachalam Mudaliar
- Pulimootai Ramasami as Balu Mudaliar
- T. P. Ponnusami Pillai as Murugan
- S. A. Natarajan as Public Prosecutor
- P. S. Sivanandham as Chokkan
- M. K. Mustafa as Sundaram Pillai
- M. N. Krishnan as Balu Mudaliar's servant
- P. S. Dhakshinamoorthi
- Nat Annaji Rao
- M. K. Gopala Iyengar
- M. A. Ganapathi

Female cast

- M. V. Rajamma as Amritham
- V. N. Janaki as Sarasa
- P. K. Saraswathi as Sundara Ghosh
- K. S. Angamuthu as Muthayi
- M. S. S. Bhagyam as Bhagyam
- M. M. Radha Bai as Anandhan's mother

Dance

- Lalitha
- Padmini

== Production ==
Velaikari was a play written by C. N. Annadurai. It was originally written for K. R. Ramasamy's drama company by Annadurai. After the play's success, M. Somasundaram of Jupiter Pictures decided to make a film version and chose Annadurai as the screenwriter. A. S. A. Sami was chosen by Annadurai to be the director after a few meetings. Per Annadurai's recommendation, Ramasamy was hired to play the protagonist. The original play was based on class conflicts and was partly inspired by the Bhawal case for the twists in the plot. Some plot elements based on the Alexandre Dumas novel The Count of Monte Cristo (1844) were suggested by Sami for the film version and accepted by Annadurai, who wrote the screenplay, which was over 1000 pages, in three days. Cinematography was handled by M. Masthan. The film was made to look like a photographed play, eschewing outdoor shots and the majority of the story being narrated through verbal narration and mid-shots, and characters turning towards the camera to speak their lines rather than the camera turning towards them. The completed film was 16,774 feet in length.

== Themes and influences ==
In the film, Mani advises Anandan of four methods to take revenge: Aduthu Kedukkum Padalam (spoiling someone's reputation by being with them), Panam Pazhakkum Padalam (spoiling their money), Manam Parikkum Padalam (spoiling their reputation) and Kan Kuththum Padalam (hurting his eyes through his own hands). A few scenes from the 1934 film version of The Count of Monte Cristo were re-enacted in Velaikari, such as the protagonist deciding to take revenge on the people responsible for his jail term after escaping from there. The climax scene of Anandan entering the court as a lawyer was inspired from the 1937 film The Life of Emile Zola.

== Soundtrack ==
The music was composed by S. M. Subbaiah Naidu and C. R. Subbaraman, with lyrics by Udumalai Narayana Kavi. The song "Innamum Paaraa Mugam Enammaa" was remixed in 2012 by Manachanallur Giridharan in his devotional album titled Om Nava Sakthi Jaya Jaya Sakthi, which was also sung by Giridharan himself.

Song	Singers	Length
"Oridam Thanile Nilaiyillaa Ulaginile"	P. Leela & K. V. Janaki	04:37
"Innamum Paaraa Mugam Enammaa"	K. R. Ramasamy	02:35
"Aada Varuvaayaa Kannaa"	T. V. Rathnam	01:59
"Neethan Allaamal Thunai Yaar"	K. R. Ramasamy	01:36
"Ulagam Palavitham"	A. P. Komala	02:56
"Laali Laali Suba Laali Laali"	T. V. Rathnam & P. Leela	01:38
"Singaara Pann Paaduven"	M. M. Mariayappa & K. V. Janaki	02:15
"Eppadi Vaazhven Inimel"	K. R. Ramasamy	03:04
"Vaazhiya Needoozhi Paguttharivaalar"	T. V. Rathnam & K. V. Janaki	03:53
"Ulagatthile Unnadhamaai Uyarndha"	T. V. Rathnam	01:19

== Release and reception ==
Velaikari was released on 25 February 1949. The scene where Anandan throws sacred objects and abuses the presiding deity at a Kali temple created controversy. Some religious groups even clamoured for a ban on the film. However, the film turned out to be a major box office success of historical importance. The 100th day function of the film was chaired by writer Va. Ramasamy at a theatre in Coimbatore. Annadurai said the film "made it clear that greed and avarice of the rich did not pay in the long run... Some of the elementary principles of the socialism and stressed that we should depend upon our own labor for our progress and well-being and not some unknown factor". After the film's success, the producers presented a Morris Car to Annadurai.

Kalki Krishnamurthy in his magazine Kalki issue date 19 June 1949 wrote, "[Velaikari] is not a film to be commented on, but a great film which came to reform society". The film's final message Ondre Kulam, Oruvane Devan (One community and one god), became a popular rhetoric of the political party Annadurai founded. Even when the play was staged, Krishnamurthy was amazed with the dialogues and scenes and appreciated Annadurai as Arignar (Meaning an Intellectual), which become a prefix for Annadurai since then. He also gave the title of "Bernard Shaw of South" to Annadurai after watching the film.

== Legacy ==
The powerful link between Tamil cinema and politics was established through this film. Hence, it can be called as a watershed film which led to changes to Tamil cinema and politics. The film become a trendsetter for its powerful and beautiful dialogues and for its strong approach on social issues and beliefs. The same route was followed by M. Karunanidhi, heir to Annadurai in films and politics, in various films including Parasakthi (1952) and Manohara (1954). Its dialogues became famous among the audience. Some of the rhetorical lines like "Sattam Oru Iruttarai. athiley vakkilin vaathamoru vilakku. anaal athu ezhaikku ettaatha vilakku" (The law is a dark room. In which the lawyer's arguments are like the lamp light, but the poor cannot get it) and "Kathiyai Theettathey, Un Puththiyai Theettu" (Don't sharpen your knife but your mind) become very famous and are used among the common public and politicians. The 1981 Tamil film Sattam Oru Iruttarai was titled after one of the film's dialogues. The popular reception Velaikari received was the beginning of the long association between the Dravidian movement and Tamil cinema. The dialogues and scenes promoting atheism led to some controversy and demands for banning the film.

== Remakes ==
Velaikari was remade in Telugu as Santhosham (1955), in Hindi as Naya Aadmi (1956), and in Kannada as Malli Maduve (1963).

== Bibliography ==
- Film News Anandan (2004). Sadhanaigal padaitha Tamil Thiraipada Varalaaru (in Tamil). Chennai: Sivagami Publications.
- Baskaran, S. Theodore (1996). The Eye of the Serpent: An Introduction to Tamil Cinema. Chennai: East West Books. OCLC 243920437.
- Dhananjayan, G. (2014). Pride of Tamil Cinema: 1931–2013. Blue Ocean Publishers. OCLC 898765509.
- Rajadhyaksha, Ashish; Willemen, Paul (1998) [1994]. Encyclopaedia of Indian Cinema. British Film Institute and Oxford University Press. ISBN 0-19-563579-5.
