= Sri Ramachandra Medical Centre =

Geography
- Location: No.1, Ramachandra Nagar, Sri Ramachandra Nagar, Chennai, Tamil Nadu 600116, India
- Coordinates: 13.037814°N 80.144607°E

Organisation
- Type: General
- Affiliated university: Sri Ramachandra Institute of Higher Education and Research

Services
- Beds: 1,800

History
- Opened: 1985

Links
- Website: www.sriramachandra.edu.in/medical/
- Lists: Hospitals in India

Sri Ramachandra Medical Centre (SRMC) is a tertiary care multi-specialty university hospital in Chennai, India. With over 1,500 beds, 114 ICU beds, 25 operating rooms, and a campus spread over 175 acres (71 ha), SRMC is one of the largest private health care facilities in South Asia. It is located in the suburb of Porur. It was founded in 1985 and has 1,800 beds.

== Accreditation and collaboration ==
From March 2009 until June 2012, the Sri Ramachandra Medical Centre was accredited by Joint Commission International and by National Accreditation Board for Hospitals & Healthcare Providers (NABH). This distinction followed an intensive collaboration with health care improvement experts at Partners Harvard Medical International.

== Departments ==
The hospital has the following departments:

1. Abdominal Organ Transplantation
2. Accident & Emergency Medicine
3. Anaesthesiology
4. Anatomy
5. Arthroscopy & Sports Medicine
6. Biochemistry
7. Biotechnology
8. Bioinformatics
9. Cardiothoracic surgery
10. Cardiology
11. Chest & Tuberculosis
12. Community Medicine
13. Dermatology & Venereology
14. Ear Nose Throat
15. Endocrinology
16. Family Medicine
17. Forensic Medicine
18. Genetics
19. General Medicine
20. General Surgery
21. Medical Gastroenterology
22. Microbiology
23. Neonatology
24. Nephrology
25. Neuro surgery
26. Neurology
27. Obstetrics & Gynaecology
28. Ophthalmology
29. Oral & Maxillofacial Surgery
30. Orthopaedic surgery
31. Otorhinolaryngology (E.N.T)
32. Paediatric Medicine
33. Paediatric Surgery
34. Pathology
35. Pharmacy
36. Physiology
37. Plastic & Reconstructive Surgery
38. Psychiatry
39. Radiology
40. Surgical Gastroenterology
41. Transfusion Medicine
42. Urology
43. Vascular Surgery
