= T. K. Shanmugam =

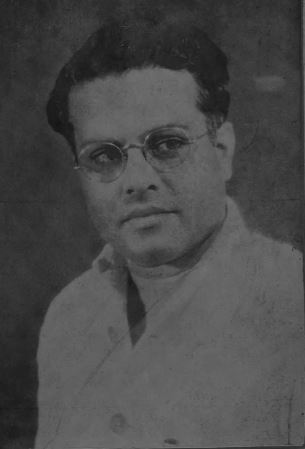
- T. K. Shanmugam in early 1950s

Background information
- Also known as: Avvai Shanmugam
- Born: Shanmugam; 26 April 1912; Thiruvananthapuram, Travancore state (present-day Kerala)
- Origin: Nagercoil, (present-day Kanyakumari District)
- Died: 15 February 1973 (aged 60) Chennai, Tamil Nadu, India
- Occupations: Actor
- Years active: 1918–1973

Thiruvananthapuram Kannuswamy Shanmugam (1912–1973; also known as "Avvai" T. K. Shanmugam) was a Tamil theatre and film artist. He acquired the prefix "Avvai" after portraying saint-poet Avvaiyar in a play.

== Early life ==
T. K. Shanmugam was born on 26 April 1912 to Tamil parents in Thiruvananthapuram, in the erstwhile princely state of Travancore. His family came from Nagercoil, (in present-day Kanyakumari District).

== Career ==
T.K. Shanmugam's family had a background in theatre and acting. At the age of six, Shanmugam joined the troupe of the legendary Sankaradas Swamigal, considered the father of Tamil theatre. At the time, women did not normally venture into the field of acting, and thus it was difficult to find women to play female roles in theatre. To overcome this, Swamigal's troupe had males play female roles. Thus, T.K. Shanmugam acted in both male and female roles.

In later years, he went on to do the title role in the play ‘Avvaiyar’, portraying the famous Tamil woman poet. Such was Shanmugam's dedication that it is said he removed two of his molar teeth for a more realistic portrayal of Avvaiyar, the old female poet. In his later years, he was more popularly referred to as ‘Avvai Shanmugam’.

"He curved his lower lip inwardly to give a realistic image of an old woman without teeth. He even removed two of his teeth for the role," says T.K.S. Kalaivanan, his son. "He had pain in his jaws for the rest of his life and the curved posture, holding a walking stick gave him constant back pain." His autobiography, Yenathu Nataka Vaazhkai, gives a panoramic view of the theatre from the beginning of the 20th century, the personalities involved in it, the plight of boys who were inducted into these troupes by their parent out of poverty, the social status of the actors and importantly the uncertain financial condition.

Actors such as N. S. Krishnan, K. R. Ramasamy, S. S. Rajendran, M. N. Rajam, director A. P. Nagarajan and one of the outstanding Carnatic vocalists T. M. Thiagarajan were some names associated with the TKS Brothers troupe. Later, it became T.K.S. Sabha and Kamal Hassan joined the troupe on the recommendation of film producer A. V. Meiyappan.

The TKS Brothers had close association with both the Communist and Dravidian movements. They used many of the songs of late communist leader P. Jeevanandham in their plays and it was Shanmugam who wrote a foreword for Annadurai's first novel, Kumasthavin Magal. As early as in 1943, T.K. Shanmugam described Annadurai as a future leader of the Tamils. In his autobiography, he had wondered how it occurred to him to call him so.

Cho Ramaswamy appreciated that his contributions to Tamil stage are unparalleled.
