= Sorgavasal =

- Theatrical release poster
- Directed by: A. Kasilingam
- Written by: Arignar Anna
- Based on: Sorgavasal (play) by Arignar Anna
- Produced by: M. Somasundaram; M. K. Kaliapa
- Starring: K. R. Ramasamy; Padmini; S. S. Rajendran; Anjali Devi
- Cinematography: G. Durai
- Edited by: A. Kasilingam
- Music by: Viswanathan–Ramamoorthy
- Production company: Parimalam Pictures
- Release date: 28 May 1954
- Running time: 211 minutes
- Country: India
- Language: Tamil

Sorgavasal (transl. Gateway to heaven) is a 1954 Indian Tamil-language historical drama film, directed by A. Kasilingam and written by C. N. Annadurai, credited as Arignar Anna. It is based on his play of the same name. The film stars K. R. Ramasamy, Padmini, S. S. Rajendran and Anjali Devi. It was released on 28 May 1954. The film was subject to political controversies and faced objections from the censor board, resulting in many scenes being cut.

== Cast ==
- K. R. Ramasamy as Madivannan
- Padmini as Queen Kumara Devi
- S. S. Rajendran as Muthu Manikam
- Anjali Devi as Thilagavathy
- R. Balasubramaniam as Court Priest
- P. S. Veerappa as King Vetrivelan

== Production ==
The film is based on a play of the same name by C. N. Annadurai. He had written screenplay and dialogues for films earlier and was credited as Annadurai. But, for the first time, in this film he was credited as Arignar Anna. The song "Aagum Neriyedhu" was originally written as "Asthigam Edhu, Naasthigam Edhu". It was recorded and released in records as such. When the film went to the censor board, they objected to these lines. Therefore, the lyricist Udumalai Narayana Kavi altered it as "Aagum Neri Edhu, Aagaa Neri Edhu".

== Soundtrack ==
The music was composed by Viswanathan–Ramamoorthy. Lyrics were by Udumalai Narayana Kavi. The song "Raajamagal Raani" became popular.

Song	Singers	Length
"Antharathil Neer.... Engae Sorgam"	K. R. Ramasamy	06:13
"Kanni Thamizh Saalaiyoram"	K. R. Ramasamy	03:23
"Maavodu Thazhuvum Malarkkodi Pole"	K. R. Ramasamy & P. Leela	03:00
"Nilave Nilave Aada Vaa"	K. R. Ramasamy & Soolamangalam Rajalakshmi	02:03
"Raajamagal Raani"	K. R. Ramasamy	02:13
"Nilave Nilave Aada Vaa" (pathos)	K. R. Ramasamy	02:51
"Aanandam Paarai Kanne"	K. R. Ramasamy	04:49
"Samarasa Nilai Arul Sannidhaanam"	K. R. Ramasamy	03:10
"Veeram Serindha Mugam"	K. R. Ramasamy & T. V. Rathnam	02:50
"Engum Niraivaana Jothiye"	K. R. Ramasamy	01:29
"Engum Inbame Ulagengum Inbame"	K. R. Ramasamy	03:10
"Santhosam Theda Venum Vaazhvile"	Thiruchi Loganathan & T. V. Rathnam	02:51
"Maasillaatha Maamani Manonmani"	K. R. Ramasamy & M. S. Rajeswari	06:05
"Aagum Neriyedhu"	K. R. Ramasamy & Nagore E. M. Hanifa	03:34
"Naanae Indha Naattin"	A. P. Komala	03:06
"Raajaadhi Raajan"	T. V. Rathnam	
"Vaazhiya Maanilam"		

== Reception ==
According to historian Randor Guy, the film underperformed at the box office because of its controversies and "mauling" by the censor board yet attained cult status due to its controversial content.

== Bibliography ==
- Rajadhyaksha, Ashish; Willemen, Paul (1998) [1994]. Encyclopaedia of Indian Cinema. British Film Institute and Oxford University Press. ISBN 0-19-563579-5.
