= P. Leela =

Indian playback singer (1934 – 2005)

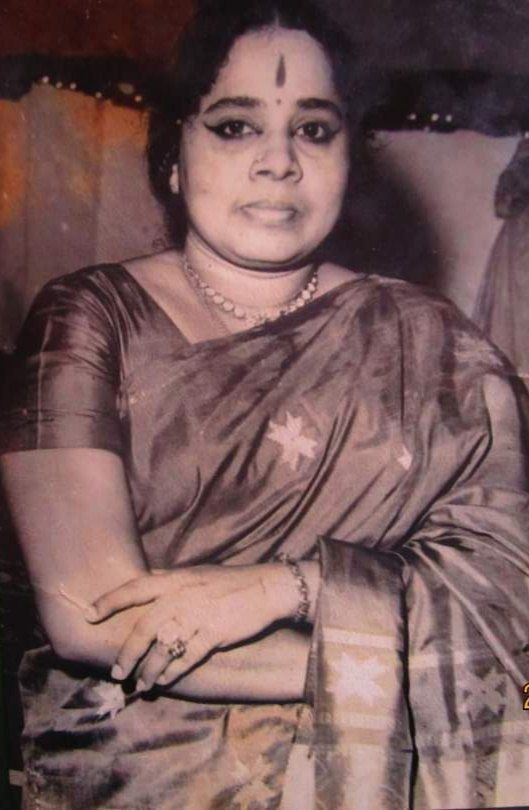
- P. Leela

Background information
- Born: Porayath Leela; 19 May 1934; Chittur, Palakkad, British India
- Died: 31 October 2005 (aged 71) Chennai, Tamil Nadu, India
- Genres: Carnatic music and playback singing
- Occupations: Singer, Composer
- Instrument: Vocalist
- Years active: 1948–2005
- Awards: Padma Bhushan, Kalaimamani

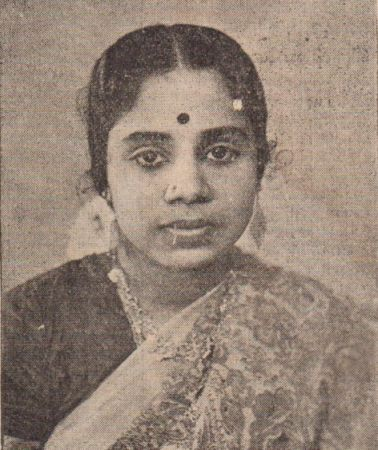
P Leela in late 1940s

Porayath Leela (19 May 1934 – 31 October 2005) was an Indian playback singer, Carnatic vocalist, and music director. She began her career as a playback singer in the 1948 Tamil film Kangkanam. She recorded songs in various Indian languages, including Malayalam, Telugu, Tamil, Kannada, Hindi, Bengali, Sanskrit, Odia, Gujarati, Marathi, and Sinhala. Leela was posthumously awarded the Padma Bhushan in 2006.

During her career, Leela collaborated with composers such as V. Dakshinamoorthy, Baburaj, G. Devarajan, Ghantasala, M. S. Viswanathan, K. Raghavan, Br Lakshmanan, L. P. R. Varma, B. A. Chidambaranath, A.T. Ummer, M. K. Arjunan, Johnson, Ouseppachan, Ilaiyaraja, as well as playback singers K. J. Yesudas and S. P. Balasubrahmanyam. Leela described her vocal style using the term Ganamani.

== Early life ==
Leela was born on 19 May 1934 in Chittur, Palakkad, Kerala, to V. K. Kunjanmenon (Menon) and Porayath Meenakshi Amma. She was the youngest of three daughters, with sisters Sharadha and Bhanumathi. Her father was a teacher at Ramavarma Higher Secondary School in Ernakulam. He encouraged his daughters to learn Carnatic music, and Leela attributed her passion for singing to his influence.

By age 13, Leela had sung over 5,000 film songs in the South Indian languages of Tamil, Telugu, Malayalam, and Kannada. She also recorded songs for Bengali and Sinhala films. Leela sang during the same era as the Carnatic musicians M. S. Subbulakshmi, M.L. Vasanthakumari, and D.K. Pattammal.

== Career ==
Leela's first guru was Thiribuvana Manibhagavadhar, the uncle of musician T. V. Gopalakrishnan. Later, she learned from Paththamadai Krishna Ayyar, Maruthuvakudi Rajagopala Iyer, and Rama Bhagavathar. Leela was trained in Carnatic music by Chembai Vaidyanatha Bhagavathar and V. Dakshinamoorthy. Vadakkancheri Ramabhagavadhar was a close friend of Leela's father, Menon. He had settled down in Madras. He would invite Menon and Leela to Madras to learn music whenever he visited Ernakulam. The headmistress of the school where Leela was studying advised her father to take her to Madras for further music training.

Menon resigned from his job in Ernakulam and took Leela to Madras in 1944. They stayed with Vadakkancheri Ramabagavathar in Mylapore and the 10-year-old Leela began learning in the gurukula style. Her father insisted that Leela do sadhaka (practice music) early in the morning.

In Madras, Leela had opportunities to listen to concerts of singers like Ariyakudi Ramanuja Iyengar, S. Ramanathan, G. N. Balasubramaniam, Chembai, and others. Leela said this 'kelvi gnanam' (learning music by listening) helped her much in developing and refining her. In 1946, Leela participated in several music competitions in her city, receiving multiple awards. Durgabai Deshmukh gave Leela her first formal concert opportunity at Andra Mahila Sabha.

=== Entry into film industry ===
The Columbia Recording Company was looking for a female voice. The manager at the time, Ganabathirama Iyer, recommended Leela. She was appointed as their artist, which paved the way for her entry into films.

In Tamil, Nandakumar was the first movie to introduce playback singing. A.V. Meiyappa Chettiar came up with the idea of replacing the soundtrack with voice and the playback system was introduced in Tamil cinema in 1938. It gradually got accepted and many singers entered the movie world.

When she landed in Madras, she did not know Tamil or Telugu. She would write the songs in Malayalam and practice them to perfection. Once she started her career as a playback singer, she arranged for tutors and learned other languages.

She got her first offer to sing in 1948 for a Tamil movie. Her father was initially reluctant but later he was persuaded to accept. Leela made her first appearance as a playback singer in the movie Kangkanam. She sang her first song, Sree Varalakshmi, at age 13. C.H. Padmanabhasastry was the music director of the film. She sang all the songs for the heroine in that film. After her debut in Kangkanam, she was the most sought-after playback singer in South Indian cinema for more than two decades, according to The Hindu.

In 1948, she sang Paaduka Poonkuyile for the Malayalam movie Nirmala, though Balan. The film was made in 1938 and it was the first Malayalam "talkie" with a soundtrack. Balan was produced by T.R Sundaram for Modern Theatres, Salem, with S. Nottani as the director.

=== Telugu movies ===
In 1949, Leela made her debut in Telugu cinema singing in three films: Mana Desam, Keelu Gurram, and Gunasundari Katha. Singer and music director Ghantasala (with whom Leela has sung the most songs) introduced Leela in Manadesam. She sang all the songs for the heroine in the film Gunasundari Katha.

By the 1950s, Leela was recording playback songs in all major South Indian languages. Around the same period, she contributed to Shavukaru, the debut production of Vijaya Productions, which did not achieve commercial success at the box office.

She sang in the film Missamma (made as Missiyamma in Tamil) and worked as a music director for a film called 'Chinnari Papalu' (Telugu) in 1968. The film was produced exclusively by women. She sang eight songs along with P. Susheela in the film Lava Kusa (1963).

== Discography ==
Year	Film	Songs
1948	Kangkanam	"Sree Varalakshmi"
1948	Thirumalisai Alvar	Giridhaari
1949	Inbavalli	*Inbamana Mohini maane with T. R. Mahalingam
1949	Gunasundari Katha	"Sri Tulasi Jaya Tulasi" "Upakara Gunalayavai"
1951	Patala Bhairavi	"Pranaya Jeevulaku Devi Varaale" "Entha Ghaatu Premayo" "Kalavaramaaye Madilo"
1951	Singari	"Jighu Jighu Samakku Paarungo" "O! Chellaiah Nee Vallaiah" "Kaanil Vennilaa Poleh" "Bhaarathi Enge Solladi" "Vaanavillaipoleh Oru Vaaliban"
1952	Amarakavi	"Chedi Maraivile Oru Poongodi", "Yaanai Thandham Pole" and "Konji Pesum Kiliye" with MKT "Mullaich Chirippile" and "Mookuthi Minnudhu" with N. L. Ghanasaraswathi
1953	Bratuku Theruvu	"Andame Anandam Anandame Jeevita Makarandam"
1954	Pudhu Yugam	"Vaazhvinile Inba Saubhagyam" "Kaadhal Kondu Poovil Vandu" with Ghantasala "Pudhu Yugam, Pudhu Yugam" with Jikki
1954	Vaira Malai	"Nadana Kala Rani" (Dance Drama) with A. P. Komala and G. K. Venkatesh
1955	Jayasimha	"Eenaati Eehaayi Kalakadoyi Nijamoyi"
1955	Missamma	"Karuninchu Mary Matha" "Telusukonave Chelli" "Yemito Ee Maaya Challani Raja" ""Raavoyi Chandamaama" "Raaga Sudha Rasa"
1956	Chiranjeevulu	"Thellavaaraga Vachhe Theliyaka Naasaami Malliparundevu Lera" "Kanupaapa Karuvaina Kanulenduko"
1956	Tenali Ramakrishna	"Jagamula Dayanele Janani Sadashivuni Manoharini"
1956	Tenali Raman	"Ulagellaam Unatharulaal Malarum", "Ulagellaam Unatharulaal Malarum (pathos)", "Aadum Kalaiyellam Paruva Mangaiyar Azhagu Koorum"
1957	Maya Bazaar	"Chinnari Sasirekha Vardhillavamm" "Vinnava Yashodamma" "Neekosame Ne Jeevinchunadi" "Neevena Nanu Thalachinadi" "Laahiri Laahiri Laahirilo" "Choopulu Kalasina Subhavela"
1957	Suvarna Sundari	"Bangaaru Vannela Rangaaru Sanjala Rangeli Yetenchene"
1957	Pathini Deivam	"Gnaanakkanna Ezhundhiru" (with T. M. Soundararajan) "Vaaraai Indre Mohana" "Chinna Chinna Vayasile" with group
1957	Babruvaahana	"Yelara Manohara; Manasemo Vayyaraala"
1958	Uthamaputhiran	"Kathiruppan Kamalakannan"
1958	Appu Chesi Pappu Koodu	"Joharu Gaikonara Deva" "Rama Rama Saranam Bhadradri Rama Saranam"
1958	Pelli Naati Pramanalu	"Sreemanturalivai Cheluvondu Maata Mammu Deevimpuma Maa Andhramata"
1959	Abalai Anjugam	"Daaladikkum Paappaa Jaaliyaaga"
1959	Amudhavalli	"Anbum Amaidhiyum" (with T. R. Mahalingam) "Singaara Vadivamaana Thithikkum" (with Sirkazhi Govindarajan)
1959	Nalla Theerpu	"Azhagaana Maaran Yaaradi"
1960	Chavukkadi Chandrakantha	"Aadchiyum Soozhchchiyum Sernthaal" (with A. G. Rathnamala) "Malarvana Veedhiyile Vasantha Thaerile"
1960	Shanti Nivasam	"Kalanaina Nee Valape Kalavaramandaina Nee Talape"
1960	Raja Makutam	"Ooredi Peredi "Sadiseyako Gaali" "Amba Jagadamba"; Edanunnado Ekkadunnado"
1961	Jagadeka Veeruni Katha	"Nanu Dayaganave Naa Moravinava" "Jalakaalaatalalo kalakalapaatalalo" along with P. Suseela and "Varinchi Vachchina Maanavaveerudu also along with P. Suseela""
1961	Kumara Raja	"Yettil Padithathodu Irundhuvidaathe" "Naan Vandhu Serndha Idam Nalla Idam" "Aanundu Paada, Pennundu Aada" (with J. P. Chandrababu)
1963	Lava Kusha	"Ramakathanu Vinarayyaa Ihapara Sukhamulanosage" "Voorake Kanneeru Nimpa Karanamemamma" "Vinudu Vinudu Ramayana Gaatha Vinudee Manasara" "Sriraamuni Charithamunu Telipedamamma"
1965	Pandava Vanavasam	"Devaa Deena Baandhavaa"
1966	Sri Krishna Pandaveeyam	"Swagatam Suswagatam" along with P. Suseela
1967	Rahasyam	"Shrilalitha Shivajyothi Sarvakaamadaa" "Evo Kanulu Karuninchinavee" (duet with Ghantasala Master, who was the music director too for this movie)

1. Sampoorna Ramayanam (1971)
2. Paramanandayya Shishyula Katha (1966)
3. Tirupathamma Katha (1963)
4. Mahamantri Timmarasu (1962)
5. Gundamma Katha (1962)
6. Dakshayagnam (1962)
7. Sri Seetha Rama Kalyanam (1961)
8. Deepavali (1960)
9. Sahasra Siracheda Apoorva Chinthamani (1960)
10. Sri Venkateswara Mahatyam (1960)
11. Krishna Leelalu (1959)
12. Pelli Sandadi (1959)
13. Mangalya Balam (1958)
14. Dongallo Dora (1957)
15. Panduranga Mahatyam (1957)
16. Preme Daivam (1957)
17. Sarangadhara (1957)
18. Bhakta Markandeya (1956)
19. Bhale Ramudu (1956)
20. Jayam Manade (1956)
21. Anarkali (1955)
22. Vadina Gari Gajulu (1955)
23. Vaddante Dabbu (1954)
24. Oka Talli Pillalu (1953)
25. Palletooru (1952)
26. Pelli Chesi Choodu (1952)
27. Patala Bhairavi (1951)
28. Navvite Navaratnalu (1951)
29. Paramanandayya Shishyula Katha (1950)

== Personal life ==
Leela married a lawyer, but the marriage was unsuccessful. In her later years, she devoted herself to performing classical concerts and light music programs. She lived with her nieces and nephews in Defence Colony, St. Thomas Mount (Parangimalai).

== Legacy, singing style ==
She was known for her ability to sing both classical and light film music. Satya Kabali, an actor, said that Leela had an emotional touch and classical discipline which she imparted in film music.

On her death, the Chief Minister of Tamil Nadu, Jayalalitha said:

She is a singer who is admired for her emotional voice and for her powerful singing.She has sung songs for Malayalam movies Tamil movies and Telugu movies.She is also known for her work, in classical music.

== Awards and recognition ==
- 1969: Received the best playback singer award from the Kerala government in 1969 for the song Ujjayiniyile Gaayika from the movie Kadalpalam.
- 1983: Kerala Sangeetha Nataka Akademi Award for Best Classical Musician
- 1986: Kerala Film Critics Association Chalachithra Prathibha Awards for overall contributions to Malayalam cinema.
- 1992: Received title of Kalaimamani Award by the Government of Tamil Nadu, which is the highest state honour in the field of Arts
- 1999: Kamukara Awards
- 2002: Life achievement awards by the Sangam Kala group
- 2003: Swaralaya Kairali Yesudas Special Jury Awards
- 2003: Janmashtami Puraskaram instituted by Balasamskara Kendram for her efforts in spreading 'Narayaniyam', 'Jnanappana' and 'Harinamakeerthanam'
- 2004: Thyagaraja Bhagavthar special awards by the Tamil Nadu government
- 2006: Awarded Padma Bhushan posthumously for her contributions.
- Swathi Ratna award and Title by Malayali club Madras for propagating Swathi Thirunal krithis

=== Honours ===
- Received a Certificate of Honour for the Growth and Development of Malayalam Films from the Kerala Government.
- Honorary membership - Malayalam Cine Technicians Association (MACTA))

=== Titles ===
Leela has been awarded many titles, including:

- Curnool - Thyagaraja Sangeetha Sabha - "Ganamathi"
- Anbathur - Maunaswamigal - "Sangeetha Hamsani"
- Guntur - Guntur Cultural Academy - "Ganakokila"
- Chennai - St. Thomas Arts Academy - "Sangeetha Saraswathi"
- Trivandrum - Trivandrum Devaswom Board - "Kalaratnam"
- Newyork - Kannada Kota & Tamil Sangam - "Gana Varshini"
- Guruvayoor - Venkatachalapathi Temple - "Nada Sudha"
- Guruvayoor - Sangeerthana Trust - "Bakthi Gana Thilakam"
- Arni - Sri Thyagaraja Sabha - "Irai Isai Mamani"
- Guruvayoor - Guruvayoor Temple - "Sangeetha Narayani"

== Death ==
P. Leela died on 31 October 2005, at 00:40 IST at Sri Ramachandra Medical Centre in Chennai. She was hospitalised in late September after suffering serious injuries sustained due to a fall in the bathroom in her home. Though she was operated on, her condition suddenly worsened due to pneumonia, possibly a complication from her long-standing asthma. She went into a deep coma a day before she died. She was cremated with full state honours on the day of her death at Besant Nagar Crematorium. The Chief Minister of Tamil Nadu, Jayalalitha eulogised her after her death.

=== Memorial ===
An open stage named Thiruvarangu was built in 2018 at her native place Chittur-Tathamangalam in her memory.
