= List of Telugu films of 1961 =

This is a list of films produced by the Tollywood film industry based in Hyderabad in 1961.

Title	Director	Cast	Music director	Ref.
Batasari	P. S. Ramakrishna Rao	A. Nageswara Rao, P. Bhanumathi, Sowcar Janaki, Devika	Master Venu	
Bava Maradallu	P. A. Padmanabha Rao	J. V. Ramana Murthy, Krishna Kumari, Malini	Pendyala Nageswara Rao	
Bhakta Jayadeva	P. Rama Rao	A. Nageswara Rao, Anjali Devi	S. Rajeswara Rao	
Bharya Bhartalu	Kotayya Pratyagatma	Akkineni Nageshwara Rao, Krishna Kumari, Relangi, Ramana Reddy, Gummadi, Padmanabham, Chadalavada, Allu Ramalingaiah, Suryakantam, Girija, Jayanti, Nirmalamma	S. Rajeswara Rao	
Bikari Ramudu	P. Padmaraju	Kanta Rao, Rajasulochana	B. Gopalam	
Evaru Donga	M. A. Thirumugam	Udaykumar, B. Sarojadevi	K. V. Mahadevan	
Gullo Pelli	K. S. Prakash Rao	Balayya, Krishna Kumari, J. V. Ramana Murthi		
Iddaru Mitrulu	A. Subbarao	A. Nageswara Rao, Rajasulochana, Sharada	S. Rajeswara Rao	
Indrajeet (Sati Sulochana)	S. Rajinikanth	N. T. Rama Rao, Anjali Devi		
Intiki Deepam Illale	V. N. Reddy	N. T. Rama Rao, Jaggayya, B. Saroja Devi, E. V. Saroja	Viswanathan–Ramamoorthy	
Jagadeka Veeruni Katha	K. V. Reddy	N. T. Rama Rao, B. Saroja Devi, L. Vijayalakshmi	Pendyala Nageswara Rao	
Jebu Donga	P. Neelakantan	M. G. Ramachandran, B. Saroja Devi, V. Nagayya	S. M. Subbaiah Naidu	
Kalasi Vunte Kaladu Sukham	Tapi Chanakya	N. T. Rama Rao, Savitri, Jaggayya, S. V. Ranga Rao, Haranath, Suryakantham	Master Venu	
Kanna Koduku	Krishna Rao	Jaggayya, Krishna Kumari, Ramakrishna, Devika	S. P. Kodandapani	
Kannyaka Parameswari Mahatmyam	A. S. A. Sami	Sivaji Ganesan, Padmini, T. R. Rajakumari, M. N. Rajam, M. N. Nambiar, N. S. Krishnan, Kula Dheivam V. R. Rajagopal, T. P. Muthulakshmi	R. Sudarsanam	
Korada Veerudu (Tamil: Chavukkadi Chandrakanta)	M. Radhakrishnan	P. S. Veerappa, Showkar Janaki, V. B. S. Mani, Tambaram Lalita, T. K. Ramachandran, Vanaja, T. S. Balaiah, Krishnabai	G. Ramanathan & J. Purushotham	
Krishna Kuchela	P. Subramaniam	Kanta Rao, C. S. R. Anjaneyulu, Miss Kumari	Brother Lakshmanan	
Krishna Prema	A. Subbarao	Balayya, Jamuna, S. V. Ranga Rao, S. Varalakshmi	Pendyala Nageswara Rao	
Pelli Kaani Pillalu	C. S. Rao	Jaggayya, Kanta Rao, Ramakrishna, Jamuna, Rajasree, Haranath, Suryakantham, Hemalatha	Master Venu	
Pendli Pilupu	A. V. Seshagiri Rao	N. T. Rama Rao, Devika	K. Prasad Rao	
Rushyasrunga	Mukkamala	Haranath, Rajasulochana, Mukkamala	T. V. Raju	
Sabhash Raja	P. S. Ramakrishna Rao	A. Nageswara Rao, Rajasulochana, Krishna Kumari, Kanta Rao, Devika	Ghantasala	
Santha	Manapuram Appa Rao	N. T. Rama Rao, Anjali Devi		
Sati Sulochana	Rajanikanth Sabnavis	N. T. Rama Rao, Anjali Devi, S. V. Ranga Rao, Kanta Rao	T. V. Raju	
Seetharama Kalyanam	N. T. Rama Rao	N. T. Rama Rao, B. Saroja Devi, Kanta Rao, Haranath, Geetanjali	Gali Penchala	
Shanta	Manapuram Apparao	N. T. Rama Rao, Anjali Devi, Kanta Rao, Krishna Kumari		
Taxi Ramudu	V. Madhusudhana Rao	N. T. Rama Rao, Devika, Jaggayya	T. V. Raju	
Thandrulu Kodukulu	K. Hemabharadara Rao	Chalam, Gummadi, Sharada	T. Chalapathi Rao	
Usha Parinayam	K. B. Nagabhushanam	Kanta Rao, S. V. Ranga Rao, Jamuna, P. Kannamba	S. Hanumantha Rao	
Vagdanam	Aatreya	A. Nageswara Rao, Krishna Kumari, Gummadi, V. Nagayya, Chalam, Girija	Pendyala Nageswara Rao	
Varalakshmi Vratham	B. Vittalacharya	Kanta Rao, Krishna Kumari	Rajan–Nagendra	
Velugu Needalu	Adurthi Subba Rao	Akkineni Nageshwara Rao, Savitri, S. V. Ranga Rao, Jaggayya, Relangi, Padmanabham, Peketi Sivaram, Suryakantham, Girija, Rajasulochana, Surabhi Kamalabai, Nagarjuna Akkineni		
