= Karaikkal Ammaiyar (disambiguation) =

Karaikkal Ammaiyar is a figure in early Tamil literature.

Karaikkal Ammaiyar may also refer to:

- Karaikal Ammaiyar Temple, dedicated to the aforementioned figure
- Karaikkal Ammaiyar (1943 film)
- Karaikkal Ammaiyar (1973 film)
