= Navajeevanam =

- Theatrical release poster
- Directed by: K. B. Nagabhushanam
- Story by: Udayakumar
- Produced by: K. B. Nagabhushanam; P. Kannamba
- Starring: V. Nagayya; P. Kannamba; Sriram; S. Varalakshmi; T. A. Jayalakshmi
- Cinematography: C. Ellappa
- Edited by: N. K. Gopal
- Music by: S. V. Venkatraman
- Production company: Raja Rajeswari Films
- Release date: 28 May 1949
- Running time: 172 minutes
- Country: India
- Language: Tamil

Navajeevanam (transl. New Livelihood) is a 1949 Indian Tamil-language film directed K. B. Nagabhushanam who jointly produced it with his wife P. Kannamba. The film stars V. Nagayya, P. Kannamba, Sriram and T. A. Jayalakshmi. It was released on 28 May 1949.

== Cast ==
The following list is adapted from the database of Film News Anandan.

Male cast

- V. Nagayya as Mahadevan
- Sriram as Prabhakar
- T. R. Ramachandran
- L. Narayana Rao
- C. V. V. Panthulu
- V. T. Kalyanam
- Rammohan

Female cast

- P. Kannamba
- S. Varalakshmi
- T. A. Jayalakshmi
- Baby Rajamani
- Sarojini
- Thulasi

== Production ==
The film was jointly produced by P. Kannamba and her husband K. B. Nagabhushanam under their own banner Raja Rajeswari Films and was directed by K. B. Nagabhushanam. Udayakumar wrote the dialogues. The cinematography was done by C. Ellappa, and the editing by N. K. Gopal. K. R. Sharma was in charge of art direction. Vembatti Satyam, Anilkumar and Chopra handled the choreography. Still photography was done by L. K. Rao. The film was made at Gemini Studios.

== Soundtrack ==
The music was composed by S. V. Venkataraman, with Kambadasan and Nagai Mani writing the lyrics.

Song	Singer/s	Length
"Jeeva Sugitha Anbe"	S. Varalakshmi, Ghantasala	03:10
"Aasai Anugraha Maaraa"	T. V. Rathnam	02:40
"Ennai Pol Sokkukaaran"	T. R. Ramachandran	02:49
"Vidhiyin Vilaiyaadal"	V. Nagayya	02:39
"Aananda Manoharaa"	S. Varalakshmi	02:25
"Adhi Sohusukaari"		03:06
"Nalla Vaazhvu"	S. Varalakshmi	02:30
"Niyaayam Idhuthaanaa"	V. Nagayya	02:36
"Yeedillaak Kaadhalar Paarinil"	Ghantasala, S. Varalakshmi	02:73
"Sri Raamaa Raghugula Naayagaa"	S. Varalakshmi	02:22

== Reception ==
The film was an average success.
