= S. V. Venkatraman =

Kalaimamani S. V. Venkatraman சோழவந்தான் வரதராஜன் வெங்கட்ராமன்
- Born: Sozhavanthan Varadharajan Venkatraman; 25 April 1911; Ayyampalayam, Madura District, Madras Presidency, British India (now in Dindigul district, Tamil Nadu, India).
- Died: 7 April 1998 (aged 86) Palavakkam, Tamil Nadu, India.
- Spouse: Saraswathi
- Award: Kalaimamani Award (1994)

Sozhavanthan Varadharajan Venkatraman (Tamil: சோழவந்தான் வரதராஜன் வெங்கட்ராமன்) (25 April 1911 – 7 April 1998), also known as SVV, was an Indian actor, singer, and music director, who was active in the Indian film industry from 1938 to the 1970s.

Venkatraman composed the music for Meera, starring M. S. Subbulakshmi. He also composed music for more than 200 Tamil, Telugu, Kannada, Malayalam, and Hindi films.

== Early life ==
Sozhavanthan Varadharajan Venkatraman was born on 25 April 1911, to Varadharajan Iyer and Lakshmi Ammal. When he was three years old, his father died, and his uncle took responsibility for his upbringing. He displayed an aptitude for music from an early age. His school education ended after the fourth standard.

To pursue his passion for music he went to Chintadripet, Madras. There the head of a drama troupe heard him singing, and offered Venkatraman a job as a stage artist/singer/musician. Venkatraman learnt to play the harmonium, but had no formal training in Carnatic music.

During his time in Madras, Venkatraman acted in five films. During a fight scene in one of the films he broke his left hand. While recuperating at Cubbon Park, Bangalore, A. V. Meiyappa Chettiar found Venkatraman and invited him back to Madras to work as the music director for Chettiar's next film, Nanda Kumar.

== Career ==
Venkatraman composed music for many films, including Nanda Kumar, Tahsildar, Valmiki, Manonmani, Kannagi, Nandanar, Meera (Tamil and Hindi), Naga Panchami, Sri Murugan, Manohara (Tamil, Telugu and Hindi), and Irumbu Thirai.

Venkatraman worked with actors such as C. N. Annadurai, M. G. Ramachandran, M. Karunanidhi, Jayalalitha, and N. T. Rama Rao. Many popular composers, including M. S. Viswanathan, T. K. Ramamoorthy, and G. K. Venkatesh worked with him.

All leading playback singers of the time from P. U. Chinnappa Bhagavathar and G. N. Balasubramaniam to M. M. Dandapani Desikar and T. M. Soundararajan lent their voices to Venkatraman's tunes. Carnatic music legends D. K. Pattammal and M. L. Vasanthakumari also came under his baton. Venkatraman himself also proved his prowess as a singer in a few films. Venkatraman's last assignment was Sri Krishna Leela.

Venkatraman scored the music for the famous "Bhaja Govindam", sung by M. S. Subbulakshmi and worked on songs that she made famous, such as "Vadavaraiyai Mathakki", "Mudiondrum Moolangalum", and a few Mahakavi Bharathiyar songs. He set to tune the Narayaneeyam and the Guruvayur Suprabhatam, rendered by Trichur Ramachandran and Papanasam Sivan's Sree Rama Charitha Geetham and sung by Sirkazhi Govindarajan. He tuned Mahakavi Bharathiyar songs and tuned Karpagambal Andhadi for M. M. Dandapani Desikar. He was the composer for All India Radio's Serndhisai, Vadhya Vrindha, and many other music ventures. Music for the Voice of India by Mahatma Gandhi's son had been scored by him.

Venkatraman worked with singers like T. M. Soundararajan, A. M. Rajah, Sirkazhi Govindarajan, Thiruchi Loganathan, V. N. Sundaram, T. A. Mothi, M. L. Vasanthakumari, P. Leela, Jikki, T. V. Rathnam, A. P. Komala, Radha Jayalakshmi, K. Jamuna Rani, P. Susheela, K. Rani, S. Janaki, and L. R. Eswari.

The singing actors M. M. Dandapani Desikar, G. N. Balasubramaniam, M. S. Subbulakshmi, D. K. Pattammal, P. U. Chinnappa, C. Honnappa Bhagavathar, U. R. Jeevarathinam, N. C. Vasanthakokilam, T. R. Mahalingam, T. R. Rajakumari, V. Nagayya, N. S. Krishnan, T. A. Madhuram, T. S. Durairaj, and J. P. Chandrababu all sang songs composed by him.

== Personal life ==
Venkatraman married Saraswathi at the age of 28 in 1939. The couple had four sons and four daughters.

== Death ==
Venkatraman died on 7 September 1998, at his residence in Palavakkam.

== Filmography ==
=== Music Direction ===
| Year | Film | Language | Director | Banner | Co-Music Director |
|---|---|---|---|---|---|
| 1938 | Nandakumar | Tamil | Keshav Rao Dhaibar | Pragati Pictures | |
| 1940 | Bhookailas | Telugu | Sundar Rao Nadkarni | Pragati Pictures | R. Sudarsanam |
| 1940 | Sakunthalai | Tamil | Ellis R. Dungan | Royal Talkies | Thuraiyur Rajagopala Sharma |
| 1941 | Mani Maalai or Mainarin Kaadhal | Tamil | Fram Sethna & A. T. Krishnaswamy | AL.RM & Company | |
| 1942 | Kannagi | Tamil | M. Somasundaram & R. S. Mani | Jupiter Pictures | |
| 1943 | Kubera Kuchela | Tamil | R. S. Mani | Jupiter Pictures | Kunnakudi Venkatarama Iyer, N. S. Balakrishnan & T. R. Ramanathan |
| 1944 | Harichandra | Tamil | K. B. Nagabhushanam | Sri Rajarajeswari Films | S. Rajeswara Rao |
| 1944 | Mahamaya | Tamil | T. R. Raghunath & Elagovan | Jupiter Pictures | Kunnakudi Venkatarama Iyer |
| 1945 | Meera | Tamil | Ellis R. Dungan | Chandraprabha Cinetone | |
| 1945 | Paranjothi | Tamil | B. S. Ramaiya | Shyamala Pictures | |
| 1946 | Sri Murugan | Tamil | M. Somasundaram & V. S. Narayanan | Jupiter Pictures | S. M. Subbaiah Naidu |
| 1946 | Valmiki | Tamil | Sundar Rao Nadkarni | Central Studios | Papanasam Sivan |
| 1947 | Meera | Hindi | Ellis R. Dungan | Chandraprabha Cinetone | |
| 1947 | Thiyagi | Tamil | Ramjibhai Arya & S. R. Krishna Ayyangar | Moorthi Productions | T. R. Ramanathan |
| 1947 | Mahathma Udhangar | Tamil | G. Pattu Iyer | Sri Kamal Productions | |
| 1948 | Gnana Soundari | Tamil | F. Nagoor & Joseph Thaliath Jr | Citadel Film Corporation | |
| 1948 | Gokuladasi | Tamil | K. Subrahmanyam | Neptune Studios | |
| 1948 | Thirumazhisai Aazhwar | Tamil | D. S. Kotnis & P. S. Chettiar | Sri Kanna Films | T. R. Ramanathan |
| 1949 | Krishna Bakthi | Tamil | R. S. Mani | Krishna Pictures | |
| 1949 | Navajeevanam | Tamil | K. B. Nagabhushanam | Rajarajeshwari Films | |
| 1950 | Laila Majnu | Tamil | F. Nagoor | Balaji Pictures | |
| 1950 | Ithaya Geetham | Tamil | Joseph Thaliath Jr. | Citadel Film Corporation | |
| 1950 | Paarijatham | Tamil | K. S. Gopalakrishnan | Lavanya Pictures | C. R. Subbaraman |
| 1951 | Vanasundari | Tamil | T. R. Raghunath | Krishna Pictures | C. R. Subbaraman |
| 1951 | Soudamini | Telugu | K. B. Nagabhushanam | Sri Rajarajeswari Films | |
| 1951 | Saudamini | Tamil | K. B. Nagabhushanam | Sri Rajarajeswari Films | |
| 1951 | Lavanya | Tamil | G. R. Lakshmanan | Eastern Art Productions | |
| 1951 | Singari | Tamil | T. R. Raghunath | National Productions | T. A. Kalyanam & T. R. Ramanathan |
| 1953 | Panakkaari | Tamil | K. S. Gopalakrishnan | Uma Pictures | |
| 1953 | Manithan | Tamil | K. Ramnoth | Jupiter Pictures & Lavanya Movies | |
| 1953 | Kangal | Tamil | Krishnan–Panju | Motion Pictures Team | G. Ramanathan |
| 1954 | Karkottai | Tamil | Kemparaj Productions | Kemparaj Urs | G. Ramanathan |
| 1954 | Manohara | Tamil | L. V. Prasad | Manohar Pictures | T. R. Ramanathan |
| 1954 | Manohar | Hindi | L. V. Prasad | Manohar Pictures | T. R. Ramanathan |
| 1954 | Manohara | Telugu | L. V. Prasad | Manohar Pictures | T. R. Ramanathan |
| 1955 | Maaman Magal | Tamil | R. S. Mani | Mani Productions | |
| 1955 | Koteeswaran | Tamil | Sundar Rao Nadkarni | Sri Ganesh Movietone | |
| 1956 | Kannin Manigal | Tamil | T. Janakiraman | Maheswari Pictures | |
| 1956 | Naga Panjami | Tamil | K. B. Nagabhushanam | Sri Rajarajeswari Films | |
| 1956 | Naga Panchami | Telugu | K. B. Nagabhushanam | Sri Rajarajeswari Films | |
| 1956 | Nannambikkai | Tamil | K. Vembu & Charlie | Film Center | |
| 1956 | Ondre Kulam | Tamil | N. Krishnaswamy | Triveni Pictures | |
| 1958 | Paanai Pidithaval Bhaagyasaali | Tamil | T. S. Durairaj | Maragatha Pictures | S. Rajeswara Rao |
| 1960 | Irumbu Thirai | Tamil | S. S. Vasan | Gemini Studios | |
| 1961 | Akbar | Tamil | K. Asif | Sterling Investment Corporation | |
| 1961 | Marutha Nattu Veeran | Tamil | T. R. Raghunath | Sri Ganesh Prasad Movies | |
| 1963 | Arivaali | Tamil | A. T. Krishnaswamy | A.T.K. Productions | |
| 1971 | Kannan Karunai | Tamil | N. T. Rama Rao | NAT & Ramakrishna Cine Studios | |
| 1977 | Sri Krishna Leelai | Tamil | A. P. Nagarajan | C. N. V. Movies | |

=== Playback Singer ===
| Year | Film | Language | Song | Co-singer | Music |
|---|---|---|---|---|---|
| 1950 | Parijatham | Tamil | Ulagathukae Unavalikkum | Jikki | S. V. Venkatraman & C. R. Subbaraman |
| 1951 | Saudamini | Tamil | Kaarum Karunaanidhiye | | S. V. Venkatraman |
| 1951 | Saudamini | Tamil | Vidhiyai Meira Vasama | | S. V. Venkatraman |
| 1953 | Manithan | Tamil | Ulagamellaam Nee Odi | | S. V. Venkatraman |
| 1953 | Kangal | Tamil | Sinna Penne Vaadi | | S. V. Venkatraman & G. Ramanathan |
| 1953 | Kangal | Tamil | Sathiyame Thavaraamale | | S. V. Venkatraman & G. Ramanathan |
| 1954 | Manohara | Tamil | Sandhegam Illai Sandhegam Illai | C. S. Pandiyan | S. V. Venkatraman & T. R. Ramanathan |
| 1954 | Manohara | Tamil | Pombalathaanaa Nee Pombalathaanaa | C. S. Pandiyan | S. V. Venkatraman & T. R. Ramanathan |
| 1954 | Manohara | Tamil | Radhi Manmadha | C. S. Pandiyan | S. V. Venkatraman & T. R. Ramanathan |
| 1955 | Koteeswaran | Tamil | Kattikko Thaali Kattikko | P. Leela | S. V. Venkatraman |
| 1956 | Kannin Manigal | Tamil | Yaen Marandhaai Eesaa | | S. V. Venkatraman |
| 1956 | Nannambikkai | Tamil | Vaaraamal Irundhiduvaano | K. Rani | S. V. Venkatraman |
| 1956 | Nannambikkai | Tamil | Sooriyanum Oru Thozhilaali | | S. V. Venkatraman |
