= T. S. Jaya =

Indian actress and singer

T. S. Jaya was an Indian actress and singer. She was active in Tamil cinema between 1937 and 1956. She was sometimes referred to as T. S. Jayarl.

== Filmography ==
Year	Film title	Character name	Director	Production company	Ref.
1937	Balamani	Balamani	P. V. Rao	Shanmughananda Talkies	
1941	Ashaadabuthi	Domestic help (Maid)	Fram Sethna, A. T. Krishnasamy	Vel Studio, Guindy	
1942	Sanyasi		M. Krishnaratnam	Jupiter Films	
1942	Tamizhariyum Perumal		T. R. Raghunath	Uma Pictures	
1943	Devakanya	Sundari	R. Padmanaban	Padma Pictures	
1943	Karaikkal Ammaiyar (1943 film)	Goddess Parvathi	C. V. Raman	Kanthan Company	
1950	Laila Majnu	Wife of Moulavi	F. Nagoor	Balaji Pictures	
1950	Parijatham	Lalitha	K. S. Gopalakrishnan	Lavanya Pictures	
1950	Ithaya Geetham	Leela (Thozhi)	Joseph Thaliath Jr.	Citadel Film Corporation	
1951	Lavanya		G. R. Lakshmanan	Eastern Art Productions	
1953	Anbu (1953 film)	Balamani	M. Nadesan	Nadesh Art Pictures	
1953	Panakkari		K. S. Gopalakrishnan	Uma Pictures	
1956	Aasai	Kathaayi	M. Nadesan	Nadesh Art Pictures	
