= Saudamini =

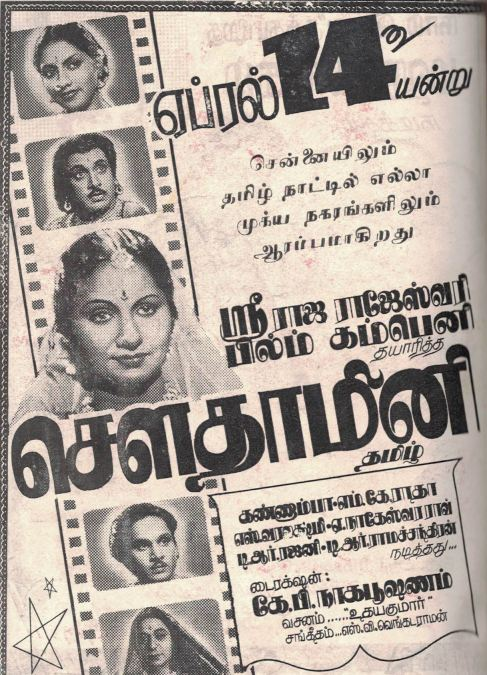
- Poster
- Directed by: K. B. Nagabhushanam
- Screenplay by: (Dialogues) Udhayakumar
- Story by: Samudrala Sr.
- Produced by: K. B. Nagabhushanam
- Starring: P. Kannamba; M. K. Radha; A. Nageswara Rao; S. Varalakshmi; T. R. Ramachandran
- Cinematography: P. Ellappa
- Edited by: N. K. Gopal
- Music by: S. V. Venkatraman
- Production company: Sri Raja Rajeswari Film Company
- Distributed by: Gemini Studios
- Release date: 14 April 1951
- Running time: 197 minutes (17798 ft.)
- Country: India
- Language: Tamil

Saudamini is a 1951 Indian Tamil language film directed by K. B. Nagabhushanam. The film stars M. K. Radha, P. Kannamba and Akkineni Nageswara Rao. It was released on 14 April 1951.

== Plot ==
A Maharishi blesses King Vikramasenan and Queen Saudamini to beget a child. The queen becomes pregnant. But the king is lured by the court dancer and he neglects the queen. The minister advises the queen to have the court dancer banished from the country. But the court dancer sows seeds of doubt in the king's mind that the queen is having an affair with the minister. So, the king orders the minister to be executed and sends the queen to the forest. The queen delivers a son, Udhayasenan, there who grows up in the forest. Meanwhile, the court dancer and her paramour, the commander blinds the king and take over the administration. Hearing this, the queen sends her son to get his father freed and regain the kingdom. On his way, the prince meets princess Hemavathi and they fall in love with each other. The son defeats the commander and recaptures the Kingdom. The king's eyesight is restored with the help of an angel. The family is united.

== Cast ==
List adapted from the database of Film News Anandan and from The Hindu review article.

Male cast

- M. K. Radha
- A. Nageswara Rao
- T. R. Ramachandran
- M. R. Swaminathan
- C. V. V. Panthulu
- Appa K. Duraiswamy
- T. E. Krishnamachari
- Jayakodi K. Natarajan

Female cast

- P. Kannamba
- S. Varalakshmi
- T. R . Rajani
- K. S. Angamuthu
- Kumari Vanaja
- Lakshmikantham

== Production ==
The film was produced and directed by K. B. Nagabhushanam under the banner Sri Raja Rajeswari Film Company owned by him and P. Kannamba. (Sri Raja Rajeswari is the family deity of Kannamba.) Samudrala Sr. wrote the story and the dialogues were penned by Udhayakumar. Cinematography was handled by P. Ellappa while the editing was done by N. K. Gopal. K. R. Sharma was in charge of art direction. Choreography was done by Anil Kumar, Chopra and Vembatti Satyam. L. K. Rao handled the still photography. The film was shot and processed at Gemini Studios.

The film was also made in Telugu as Soudamini directed by K. B. Nagabhushanam. The cast was slightly different. M. K. Radha was replaced by C. S. R.

== Soundtrack ==
Music was composed by S. V. Venkatraman while the lyrics were penned by Udhayakumar and Lakshmanadas. Playback singers are S. V. Venkatraman and M. L. Vasanthakumari.

Song	Singer/s
"Annavan Rani Maha Padhiviradhai"	
"Anbe En Sivame Aandarulvaaye"	M. L. Vasanthakumari
"Maara Sundara Maadhu Ivale"	M. L. Vasanthakumari
"Onbadhu Maadhamum Niraindha Piragu"	
"Koohoo Ena Maangkuyil Konjudhaasaiyaale"	
"Vaa Vaa Vaa Vaanamudhe"	
"Sollu Sollu Vivaramaayi"	
"Nenjame Irulaanadhe"	
"O! Pal Johra Velum Poattu"	
"Kaarum Karunaanidhiye"	S. V. Venkatraman
"Vidhiyai Meira Vasama Vilagi Poga Vidumo"	S. V. Venkatraman
"Kaalame Pagaiyaanadh"	
"Ini Verae Maargamillaiyo"	
"Anaiyaa Jyothi Polae Naane"	
"Bale Joraayi Kelaayi Appane"	
