= Kambadasan =

Indian writer, poet, and lyricist

- Born: Appaavu a.k.a. Rajappa; 15 September 1916; Ulagapuram; Tindivanam; South Arcot District (Madras Presidency)
- Died: 23 May 1973 (aged 56); Chennai
- Occupations: Writer, Poet
- Known for: Film Lyricist
- Parent(s): Father: Subbarayar; Mother: Balammal

Kambadasan (1916–1973) was an Indian writer, poet and film lyricist who worked mainly in Tamil-language films.

== Early life ==
Kambadasan was born as Appaavu a.k.a. Rajappa at Ulagapuram, a village near Tindivanam in the then South Arcot District (Madras Presidency) on 15 September 1916. His father Subbarayar was a potter and his mother is Balammal. He was the only son to his parents whose other five children were all girls. The family migrated to Purasaivakkam in Chennai when he was a child. The school education came to an end with 6th standard.

He was interested in stage plays. With his fine voice, singing talents and ability to play the harmonium, he soon established a place for himself in stage dramas. Rajappa was devoted to poet Kambar and took his pen name as Kambadasan which means fanatic of Kambar.

== Career ==
As a writer, he has written short stories, poems and plays.

With his talents, it was an easy entry for him into the Tamil cinema. He started as an actor and then developed into scriptwriter and lyricist. His debut as a lyricist was in Vaamana Avatharam (1940) in which he was credited as C. S. Rajappa. He wrote the dialogues for Saalivaahanan (1945) and as a popular lyricist with the hit song Arul Thaarum Deva Mathaave in Citadel's Gnana Soundari (1948). Another song Parthal pasi theerum sung by the erstwhile P. U. Chinnappa for the film Mangayarkarasi (1949) also was a hit. He was also featured as the court poet in this film.

He was adept at writing for dubbed films. Many of the films dubbed from Hindi and Telugu were successful at the box office in Tamil mainly due to his dialogues and lyrics. The challenge for writing for dubbed films is to write lyrics with the tune already set and to suit the lip movements. A case in point for his success in such films is Vaanaratham (1956). Lata Mangeshkar who sang the original Hindi songs rendered the Tamil versions written by Kambadasan.

== Family life and death ==
He first married Chitralekha, a dancer and daughter of Malayalam poet Vallathol. The marriage did not last long and they separated soon. Then he married poet and school teacher Susheela. That marriage also failed. He married again a dancer Anusuya.

Kambadasan was admitted to Royapettah hospital due to failing health condition related to alcoholism, and he died on 23 May 1973.

== Filmography ==
=== As actor ===
Year	Film	Role	Director	Banner	Remarks
1934	Draupadi Vastrapaharanam		R. Prakash	Sreenivas Cinetone	
1934	Srinivasa Kalyanam		A. Narayanan	Sreenivasa Cinetone	
1949	Mangayarkarasi	Court Poet	Jiten Bannerjee	Bhagya Films	

=== As Script and Dialogues writer ===
Year	Film	Director	Banner	Remarks
1944	Poompaavai	Krishnan–Panju	Leo Films	Story
1945	Saalivaahanan	B. N. Rao	Bhaskar Pictures	Dialogues
1949	Mangayarkarasi	Jiten Bannerjee	Bhagya Pictures	Screenplay
1949	Naattiya Rani	B. N. Rao	Baskar Pictures	Story & Dialogues
1952	Thanthai	M. R. S. Mani	Excel Productions	Dialogues; Dubbed from Malayalam
1953	Avan Yaar	Antony Mitradas	Neela	Dialogues; Dubbed from Malayalam

=== As lyricist ===
Year	Film	Music director	Director	Banner	Remarks
1940	Vaamana Avatharam	N. B. S. Mani	Prem Chethna	Lakshmi Films	Credited as C. S. Rajappa
1942	Aaraichimani	Srinivasa Rao Shinde	P. K. Raja Sandow	Kandhan Studio	
1944	Mahamaya	S. V. Venkatraman; Kunnakkudi Venkatrama Iyer	T. R. Raghunath	Jupiter Pictures	
1948	Gnana Soundari	S. V. Venkatraman	F. Nagoor, Joseph Thaliath Jr.	Citadel Film Corporation	
1950	Ithaya Geetham	S. V. Venkatraman	Joseph Thaliath Jr.	Citadel Film Corporation	
1950	Laila Majnu	S. V. Venkatraman	F. Nagoor	Balaji Pictures	
1950	Parijatham	C. R. Subburaman; S. V. Venkatraman	K. S. Gopalakrishnan	Lavanya Pictures	
1951	Vanasundari	S. V. Venkatraman; C. R. Subburaman	T. R. Raghunath	Krishna Pictures	
1951	Mayakkari	P. Adinarayana Rao	P. Sridhar	Aswini Pictures	Film made in Tamil and Telugu simultaneously
1952	Aan or Murattu Adiyal	Naushad	Mehboob Khan		Dubbed from Hindi
1952	Pasiyin Kodumai	P. S. Diwakar	K. J. Mohan Rao	K & K Combines	Dubbed from Malayalam
1952	Priyasakhi	Br Lakshmanan	G. R. Rao	Neela Productions	Dubbed from Malayalam
1952	Shyamala	G. Ramanathan; T. V. Raju; Dinakar Rao	P. A. Subba Rao	Yuva Pictures	
1953	Anbu	T. R. Pappa	M. Natesan	Natesh Art Pictures	
1953	Avan	Shankar Jaikishan	Raja Nawathe	R. K. Films	Dubbed from Hindi
1953	Avan Yaar	Brother Lakshmanan	Antony Mitradas	Neela	Dubbed from Malayalam
1953	Poongodhai	P. Adinarayana Rao	L. V. Prasad	Anjali Pictures	Film made in Tamil and Telugu simultaneously
1953	Thanthai	P. S. Diwakar	M. R. S. Mani	Excel Productions	Dubbed from Malayalam
1955	Kangal	S. V. Venkatraman; G. Ramanathan	Krishnan–Panju	Motion Picture Team	
1955	Maaman Magal	S. V. Venkatraman	R. S. Mani	Mani Productions	
1956	Kannin Manigal	S. V. Venkatraman	T. Janakiraman	Maheswari Pictures	
1956	Kudumba Vilakku	T. R. Pappa	F. Nagoor	Nagoor Cine Productions	
1956	Marma Veeran	Vedha	T. R. Raghunath	Mehboob Studio	
1956	Moondru Pengal	C. N. Pandurangan	R. S. Prakash	Jayasri Lakshmi Pictures	
1956	Nannambikkai	S. V. Venkatraman	K. Vembu; Charlie	Film Centre	
1956	Vaanaratham	Naushad	S. U. Sunny	Sunny Art Productions	Dubbed from Hindi
1957	Magathala Nattu Mary	R. Parthasarathy	S. S. Rajan	Jaikumar Pictures	
1958	Avan Amaran	T. M. Ibrahim	S. Balachander	Beaubills Films	
1959	Kalaivaanan	Pendyala Nageswara Rao	P. Pullaiah	Sharadha Films	
1959	Manimekalai	G. Ramanathan	V. S. Raghavan	Sekar Art Film Enterprises	
1959	Odi Vilaiyaadu Paapa	V. Krishnamoorthi	Muktha Srinivasan	Jagajothi Films	
1959	Yaanai Valartha Vaanambadi	Br Lakshmanan	P. Subramaniam	Neela	Dubbed from Malayalam
1961	Akbar	Naushad	K. Asif	Sterling Investment Corporation	Dubbed from Hindi
1962	Mahaveera Bheeman	M. S. Gnanamani	S. A. Subbaraman	Jaikumar Pictures	
1963	Kubera Theevu	C. N. Pandurangan	G. Viswanathan	Nithyakalyani Films	

== Bibliography ==
- "பிறவிக் கவிஞர்களுள் ஒருவர் கம்பதாசன்" [Kambadasan, One of the born poets]. Archived from the original on 25 May 2017., Dinamani
- "காலம் மறந்து விட்ட காதலும் கண்ணீரும் தந்த கவிஞர் கம்பதாசன்" [Forgotten poet Kambadasan who gave love and tears].
- G. Neelamegam. Thiraikalanjiyam — Part 1 (in Tamil). Manivasagar Publishers, Chennai 108 (Ph:044 25361039). First edition December 2014.
- G. Neelamegam. Thiraikalanjiyam — Part 2 (in Tamil). Manivasagar Publishers, Chennai 108 (Ph:044 25361039). First edition November 2016.
