= Tollywood films of 1961 =

Tollywood films of 1961 may refer to:

- Bengali films of the 1961
- Telugu films of 1961
