= Ezhai Uzhavan =

- Theatrical release poster
- Directed by: K. B. Nagabhushanam
- Screenplay by: Udhayakumar
- Story by: Kopparapu Subba Rao
- Produced by: K. B. Nagabhushanam
- Starring: M. Sriramamurthy; P. Kannamba; Anjali Devi; Mudigonda Lingamurthy
- Cinematography: P. Ellappa
- Music by: H. R. Padmanabha Sastry
- Production company: Sri Raja Rajeswari Films
- Release date: 17 October 1952
- Running time: 172 minutes
- Country: India
- Language: Tamil

Ezhai Uzhavan (transl. Poor Cultivator) is a 1952 Indian Tamil-language film directed by K. B. Nagabhushanam. The film stars M. Sriramamurthy and Anjali Devi. It was released on 17 October 1952.

== Plot ==
A young man in a Zamin village loves a girl. The evil son of the zamindar also wants that girl. The zamindar's son uses his might and evicts the young man from the Zamin village controlled by the zamindar. The young man returns to the village, overpowers the zamindar's henchmen and gets all Zamin land distributed among the villagers.

== Cast ==
List adapted from the database of Film News Anandan and from the Encyclopedia of Indian Cinema.

Male cast

- M. Sriramamurthy
- Relangi
- Doraiswamy
- Mudigonda Lingamurthy
- D. Sadasivarao
- C. V. V. Panthulu

Female cast

- P. Kannamba
- Anjali Devi
- T. P. Muthulakshmi
- Lakshmiprabha

== Production ==
The film was produced by K. B. Nagabhushanam, who also directed it under the banner Sri Raja Rajeswari Film Company owned by him and P. Kannamba. Kopparapu Subba Rao wrote the story and Udhayakumar wrote the dialogues. Cinematography was done by P. Ellappa. K. R. Sharma was in charge of art direction while Chopra and Vembatti Satyam handled the choreography. The film was shot and processed at Gemini Studios. The film was produced also in Telugu with the title Peda Raithu.

== Soundtrack ==
Music was composed by H. R. Padmanabha Sastry while the lyrics were written by Kavi. Lakshmanadas. There are 13 songs in the film. Playback singers include A. M. Rajah and Jikki.

== Bibliography ==
- Rajadhyaksha, Ashish; Willemen, Paul (1998) [1994]. Encyclopaedia of Indian Cinema. British Film Institute and Oxford University Press. ISBN 0-19-563579-5.
