= Lakshmi (1953 film) =

1953 film by K. B. Nagabhushanam

- Theatrical release poster
- Directed by: K. B. Nagabhushanam
- Screenplay by: S. D. S. Yogiar
- Produced by: P. Kannamba
- Starring: P. Kannamba; Manohar; C. V. V. Panthulu; Vanaja
- Cinematography: P. Ellappa
- Edited by: N. K. Gopal
- Music by: M. D. Parthasarathy
- Production company: Sri Raja Rajeswari Films
- Release date: 19 December 1953
- Country: India
- Language: Tamil

Lakshmi is a 1953 Indian Tamil-language drama film directed by K. B. Nagabhushanam and produced by P. Kannamba. The latter stars as the female lead, with Manohar as the male lead. It was released on 19 December 1953.

== Cast ==
Credits adapted from song book.

Male cast

- Manohar as Chandran
- L. Narayana Rao as Kandasami
- C. V. V. Panthulu as Narayanasami
- Friend Ramasami as Shankara Iyer
- Chandra Babu as Venkatesan
- T. K. Ramachandran as Balu
- T. V. Sethuraman as Kaseem
- Duraisami as Mister Chidambaram
- Gopalachari as Police Inspector

Female cast

- Kannamba as Lakshmi
- Vanaja as Thara
- M. Saroja as Parvathi
- C. K. Saraswathi as Kanthamma
- Venu Bai as Rangamma
- Rajalakshmi as Velayi
- Kamala as Dancer

Supported by

Lakshmi, Sridevi, Shanthakumari Jayashree, and Seshakumari.

== Production ==
P. Kannamba, besides producing the film under her production company Sri Raja Rajeswari Films, starred as the female lead, while her husband K. B. Nagabhushanam was the director. The film was shot at Gemini Studios, and many Gemini employees like music director M. D. Parthasarathy, cinematographer P. Ellappa, audiographer P. Ranga Rao, art director M. S. Janakiram, and make-up artist Sahadeva Rao Thapkere (a cousin of Dadasaheb Phalke) worked on it. The screenplay was written by S. D. S. Yogiar, and editing was handled by N. K. Gopal. The final length of the film was 15,196 feet (4,632 m).

== Soundtrack ==
The soundtrack was composed by M. D. Parthasarathy, and the lyrics were written by S. D. S. Yogiar.

== Release and reception ==
Lakshmi was released on 19 December 1953. Film historian Randor Guy said the film did not succeed commercially due to the "predictable nature of the story".
