= Balamani =

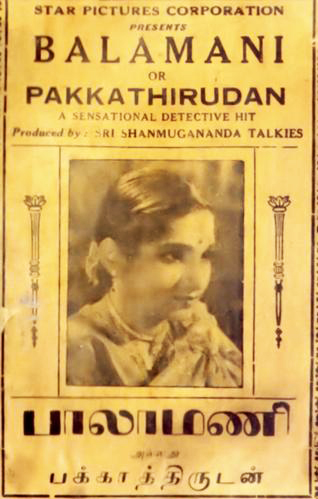
- Poster
- Directed by: P. V. Rao
- Based on: Pucca Thirudan by K. Duraiswami Ayyangar
- Starring: T. K. Shanmugam; T. S. Jaya
- Production company: Shanmughananda Talkies
- Release date: 1937
- Country: India
- Language: Tamil

Balamani is a 1937 Indian Tamil-language film directed by P. V. Rao and produced by Shanmughananda Talkies. It is based on the two-volume novel of the same name, alternatively titled Pakka Thirudan by Duraiswamy Ayyangar. The film stars T. K. Shanmugam, T. S. Jaya, T. K. Muthusami, B. Saradambal, T. K. Bhagavathi, K. Shanthadevi and S. V. Sahasranamam.

== Plot ==
Balamani, a wealthy woman, is due to be married. She and her fiancé are abducted in a robbery at her palace one night. When Balamani regains consciousness, she finds herself in a dark cave, and has no idea of what happened. Her fiancé abandons her and escapes. Balamani tries to return home but, while passing through a river, she finds the corpse of a child. Balamani decides to take the corpse with her and bury it somewhere, until police officers appear and mistake her for having murdered the child, leading to her arrest. Balamani's family engages Eardley Norton, the current barrister of Madras, who defends her during her trial and has her acquitted. The real culprits are apprehended, and Balamani reunites with her fiancé.

== Cast ==
- T. S. Jaya as Balamani
- S. V. Sahasranamam as Detective Ranjit Singh
- T. K. Shanmugam

== Music ==
The songs were written by Bharathidasan, in his feature film debut.

== Reception ==
Shanmughananda Talkies and TKS Brothers, who produced the film, disowned the way it was presented, and it was a commercial failure.
