= Vikramarka Vijayam =

- Theatrical release poster
- Directed by: G. Suryam
- Written by: Bhavanarayana Rao Chillara (dialogue), G. Suryam (screenplay)
- Produced by: Pinjala Subbarao
- Starring: Ramakrishna; S.V. Ranga Rao; Anjali Devi; Balaiah M.
- Release date: 1971
- Country: India
- Language: Telugu

Vikramarka Vijayam is a 1971 Indian Telugu-language folk film directed by Giduturi Suryam. It stars Ramakrishna, S. V. Rangarao and Mannava Balaya.

== Cast ==
- Ramakrishna
- S. V. Rangarao
- Mannava Balaya
- Vijayanirmala
- Anjali Devi
- Rajashree
