= Lavanya (film) =

- Directed by: G. R. Lakshmanan
- Written by: G. R. Lakshmanan
- Produced by: G. R. Lakshmanan
- Starring: T. E. Varadan; Suryaprabha; Vanaja; Kumari Kamala
- Cinematography: Marcus Bartley; Adi Irani
- Edited by: Jambu; A. S. Thangavelu
- Music by: S. V. Venkataraman
- Production company: Eastern Art Productions
- Release date: 26 May 1951
- Running time: 173 minutes
- Country: India
- Language: Tamil

Lavanya is a 1951 Indian Tamil language film directed by G. R. Lakshmanan. The film stars T. E. Varadan and Suryaprabha. It was released on 26 May 1951.

== Plot ==
Two poor girls make their living by street dancing. Some heavenly maidens descend to Earth and want to have fun. They make one of the girls to get lost while bathing and turn the other girl into a handsome young man. Now the young man falls in love with a princess and they marry. A divine person presents the young man with a ring and says the ring will give whatever he wants but there is one condition. The young man should not consummate his marriage. So, the young man gets all he wants and strictly guards himself from having sex with his wife. The wife does all sorts of things to seduce him. At last, one day he relents to her charms and has sex with her. But, Lo and behold! He loses everything he had. How he fights back to get back all the things and also the lost girl, forms the rest of the story.

== Cast ==
List adapted from the database of Film News Anandan and from the Hindu review article.

- T. E. Varadan as the Young Man
- Suryaprabha as Lavanya
- Vanaja as a poor girl, who become the Young Man
- Kumari Kamala as poor girl who gets lost while bathing
- Pulimoottai Ramaswami
- T. S. Jaya
- C. R. Rajakumari

== Production ==
The film was produced and directed by G. R. Lakshmanan who also wrote the story and dialogues. Cinematography was handled by Marcus Bartley and Adi Irani while the editing was done by Jambu and A. S. Thangavelu. K. Nageswara Rao was in-charge of Art direction. K. N. Dandayudhapani Pillai, Vazhuvoor B. Ramaiyah Pillai and Hiralal did the choreography. The film was shot at Vauhini studios.

== Soundtrack ==
Music was composed by S. V. Venkatraman while the lyrics were penned by Papanasam Sivan

Song	Singer/s
"Enni Enni En Manadhu"	
"Thanga Oru Nizhalillaiye...Bharatha Nannaadu"	D. K. Pattammal
"Kaalam Kettu Poche"	Jikki
"Idhu Mun Seydha Vinaiyo"	P. A. Periyanayaki
"Yezhai Ennidam Umadhu Manamum"	P. A. Periyanayaki
"Thoodhu Nee Sellaayo Mugile"	P. A. Periyanayaki
"Unai Ninaindhurugi Kanavilum"	

== Reception ==
The film did not fare well at the box office. However, according to Randor Guy, it is remembered for the dance sequences and cinematography.
