= Manithan (1953 film) =

1953 film by K. Ramnoth

- Theatrical release poster
- Directed by: K. Ramnoth
- Screenplay by: Pa. Adhimoolam; Na. Somasundaram
- Story by: Muthukulam Raghavan Pillai
- Starring: T. K. Shanmugam; T. K. Bhagavathi; Krishnakumari; Madhuri Devi
- Music by: S. V. Venkatraman
- Production companies: Jupiter Pictures; Lavanya Movies
- Release date: 17 April 1953
- Running time: 174 minutes
- Country: India
- Language: Tamil

Manithan (transl. The Man) is a 1953 Indian Tamil-language drama film directed by K. Ramnoth. The film stars T. K. Shanmugam, T. K. Bhagavathi and Krishnakumari. It is based on the play of the same name by the TKS Brothers, itself a Tamil adaptation of the Malayalam play Manushyan by Muthukulam Raghavan Pillai. The film was released on 17 April 1953.

== Plot ==
A young wife lives with her husband's joint family. Her husband is a doctor serving in the army and he is away from home. The family gives accommodation to an artist in their house. The artist seduces the young wife and she becomes pregnant. He is chased out of the home and he goes to Bombay. He becomes involved in a car accident. The young wife's husband, the army doctor, is the driver of the car and he takes the artist to a hospital. The artist tells his story to the doctor without knowing that the same doctor is the husband of the woman he molested. The doctor discovers the truth. What happens afterwards forms the rest of the story.

== Cast ==
List adapted from the database of Film News Anandan and from the Hindu review article.

Male cast

- T. K. Shanmugam
- T. K. Bhagavathi
- S. A. Natarajan
- C. V. V. Panthulu
- M. S. Karuppaiah
- K. Ramasami

Female cast

- Krishnakumari
- Madhuri Devi
- Pandari Bai

Dance

- Ragini
- Kumari Kamala

== Production ==
Manithan is based on the Malayalam play Manushyan by Muthukulam Raghavan Pillai. When it was staged in Tamil by the TKS Brothers, the title was changed to Manithan. The film adaptation was produced as a joint venture by Jupiter Pictures and Lavanya Movies owned by S. K. Sundararama Iyer and was directed by K. Ramnoth. Art direction was by A. K. Sekar. The film was shot at Neptune Studios that was leased by Jupiter Pictures.

== Soundtrack ==
Music was composed by S. V. Venkatraman while the lyrics were penned by Kanagasurabhi.

Song	Singer/s	Length
"Kaasirundhaal Kai Maele"	P. Leela	03:19
"Meesai Naraichavan Pendaatti...Naanaa Kizhavan"	T. V. Rathnam	03:04
"Kuyile Unakanandha Kodi Namaskaaram"	M. L. Vasanthakumari	02:53
"Pongi Varum Muzhu Madhiyai...Karpanai Ellaam.."	Thiruchi Loganathan	02:48
"Kaalamellaam Thanimaiyile"	Jikki	03:10
"Penne Ulagin Kanne"	M. S. Rajeswari	02:40
"Ulagamellaam Nee Odi"	S. V. Venkatraman	03:09

== Reception ==
The Hindu wrote, "The film keeps close to the stage version ... The changes makes are in consonance with the demands of the screen and are a demonstration of how film adaptation[s] should be made". The Indian Express wrote, "The gripping story is unfolded with interest keyed and kept up right through... A noteworthy feature is the subtiel handling of humour which is most unobtrusive and thoroughly enjoyable". According to historian Randor Guy, the film did not fare well at the box office, but gained praise for the performances of Shanmugam, Bhagavathi and Krishnakumari, and the direction of Ramnoth.

== Bibliography ==
- Rajadhyaksha, Ashish; Willemen, Paul (1998) [1994]. Encyclopaedia of Indian Cinema. British Film Institute and Oxford University Press. ISBN 0-19-563579-5.
- Shanmugam, Avvai (1986). எனது நாடக வாழ்க்கை [My stage life] (in Tamil). Vanathi Pathippagam. OCLC 422902391.
