= Saalivaahanan =

- Theatrical poster
- Directed by: B. N. Rao
- Screenplay by: Kambadasan
- Story by: B. S. Ramaiah
- Starring: Ranjan; T. R. Rajakumari; M. G. Ramachandran; K. L. V. Vasantha
- Music by: Nagercoil K. Mahadevan
- Production company: Bhaskar Pictures
- Release date: 16 February 1945
- Country: India
- Language: Tamil

Saalivaahanan is a Tamil language film directed by B. N. Rao, and starring Ranjan, T. R. Rajakumari, M. G. Ramachandran and K. L. V. Vasantha. The film was released in 1945. No print of the film is known to survive, making it a lost film.

== Cast ==
Male

- Ranjan as Saalivahanan
- M. G. Ramachandran as Vikramaditya
- Nagercoil K. Mahadevan
- T. S. Balaiah
- N. S. Krishnan

Female

- T. R. Rajakumari as Princess Chandralekha
- K. L. V. Vasantha as Vikramaditya's sister
- M. R. Santhanalakshmi
- T. A. Madhuram

== Production ==
The film had a sequence, a love scene between Ranjan and T. R. Rajakumari, in colour. It was done by hand-tinting each frame of the sequence. M. G. Ramachandran, who was acting in minor roles at that time, played as villain. According to film historian Randor Guy, during the shooting of a sword fight between Ranjan and Ramachandran, the latter complained to the director that "Ranjan was putting in too much of realism in the fencing which was likely to hurt him!"

== Soundtrack ==
1. Kayirai edutthukko by N. S. Krishnan & T. A. Madhuram

== Reception ==
According to film historian Randor Guy, Saalivaahanan did not do well at the box office and the producers lost heavily in the process. He stated the film would be remembered for coloured sequence and the comedy of Krishnan-Mathuram.
