= Marutha Nattu Veeran =

- Theatrical release poster
- Directed by: T. R. Raghunath
- Produced by: B. Radhakrishna
- Starring: Sivaji Ganesan; Jamuna; P. S. Veerappa; P. Kannamba
- Cinematography: R. Sampath
- Edited by: T. R. Raghunath; P. K. Krishnan; A. P. Jagadish
- Music by: S. V. Venkatraman
- Production company: Sri Ganesh Prasad Movies
- Release date: 24 August 1961
- Country: India
- Language: Tamil

Marutha Nattu Veeran (transl. Hero of the Marutha nation) is a 1961 Indian Tamil-language swashbuckler film, directed by T. R. Raghunath and produced by B. Radhakrishna. The film stars Sivaji Ganesan, Jamuna, P. S. Veerappa and P. Kannamba. It was released on 24 August 1961.

== Plot ==
Jeevagan, a brave young man, is appointed as the high guard to protect princess Ratna and soon they fall in love. Meanwhile, the King's minister, Veera Kesha is secretly plotting with the Sultan, a known enemy of the throne. Veera Kesha frames Jeevagan as a traitor and turns the Kingdom against him. What sinister plan does the Sultan hold? Can Jeevagan prove his innocence and save the Kingdom?

== Cast ==
- Sivaji Ganesan as General Jeevagan
- Jamuna as Princess Rathna
- P. S. Veerappa as Royal body guard Veerakesari
- P. Kannamba as Jeevagan's mother
- Sriram as Prince Parthiban, he is prince of Pavala Kingdom and his uncle of Princess Rathna
- A. Karunanidhi as Blacksmith/Jeevagan's friend
- A. Rama Rao as Price Dhariyanathan, Rathna's half-brother
- K. Natarajan as Maruthanattu King
- M. R. Santhanam
- P. S. Venkatachalam as Sultan Aladdin
- K. R. Ramsingh as P.S. Veerappa's friend, Ikram
- Nandha Ram
- K. Kannan as Veerakesari's henchmen
- Ganapathy Bhat as Kadamba
- N. R. Sandhya as Queen Alangari
- M. Saroja as Kanmani, Princess Rathna's friend
- K. V. Shanthi as Aasha
- Jyothi

== Soundtrack ==
The music was composed by S. V. Venkatraman.

Song	Singers	Lyrics	Length
"Paruvam Paartthu Arugil"	T. M. Soundararajan	Kannadasan	03:46
"Oruvarai Oruvar Unarnthukondale"	T. M. Soundararajan	Kannadasan	
"Kallirukkum...Enge Selkindaraai"	P. B. Sreenivas	Kannadasan	04:22
"Vizhiyalai Mele Semmeen Pole"	T. M. Soundararajan & P. Susheela	Kannadasan	05:57
"Arumbudhira Mutthudhira Azhagu Sirikkudhu"	T. M. Soundararajan & P. Susheela	A. Maruthakasi	03:44
"Samaadhaaname Thevai"	T. M. Soundararajan	A. Maruthakasi	04:07
"Dhairiyathukkoru Santhegam Kelu Kanmani"	A. L. Raghavan & A. G. Rathnamala	A. Maruthakasi	03:11
"Pudhu Inbam Ondru Uruvaagi Indru"	P. Susheela	A. Maruthakasi	02:41
"Aasai Kaadhal"	P. Susheela	A. Maruthakasi	04:34

== Reception ==
The Indian Express praised the film for the performances of Ganesan, Kannamba, Jamuna and Veerappa, and the lyrics by Kannadasan and Maruthakasi. Kanthan of Kalki negatively reviewed the film, and hoped it would put an end to Tamil films based on monarchs.
