= Naga Panjami =

- Directed by: K. Nagabushanam
- Produced by: K.Nagabushanam
- Starring: Anjali Devi; S. Varalakshmi; Chittor V. Nagayya; K. A. Thangavelu; P. Kannamba
- Production company: Sri RajaRajeswari Film Company
- Release date: 9 March 1956 (India)
- Running time: 156 mins.
- Country: India
- Language: Tamil

Naga Panchami is a 1956 Indian Tamil language film produced and directed by K. Nagabushanam. The film stars Anjali Devi, S. Varalakshmi and Chittor V. Nagayya. It was released on 9 March 1956.

== Cast ==
The list is adapted from the database of Film News Anandan

- Anjali Devi
- S. Varalakshmi
- Chittor V. Nagayya
- K. A. Thangavelu
- P. Kannamba

== Production ==
While Kannamba was producing this film in Tamil, AVM produced the same story in Kannada with the title Naga Devatha. They dubbed that film into Tamil and released with the title Naga Devathai before Kannamba released her film. Therefore, Kannamba's film Naga Panchami was a flop. So, Kannamba dubbed that film into Telugu and released.

== Soundtrack ==
The lyrics were penned by S. D. S. Yogi, Nagai Mani and V. Seetharaman. Music composer is not known.

Song	Singer/s	Lyricist	Duration (m:ss)
"Om Namasivaaya"	S. Varalakshmi with group		03:29
"Aanandam Thandhaane"	N. L. Ganasaraswathi with group		03:12
"Jagadhamba Devi Bhavaani"	Jikki		02:39
"Miga Ullaasamaaga Pengal"	Jikki		02:35
"Kanivaana Nalla Saedhi"	Jikki		
"Umaa Deviye Un Arulaal"	Jikki		
"Naadhanin Aasi Kavara Vandhaaye"	Jikki		
"Maadhaa EnMeedhu Karunai Illaiyaa"	Jikki		02:36
"Kannaana Naadhan Ennaaginaano"	Jikki		
"Pennaayi Pirandhathum Vidhithaano"	A. M. Rajah		02:59
"Vaasam Pidippathai...Naattukku Naadu Mattam"	S. C. Krishnan & A. P. Komala		02:48
"Sambo Maha Devaa"	V. Nagayya, S. Varalakshmi with group		02:03
