= Gnana Soundari (Gemini film) =

1948 Indian film directed by Murugadasa and produced by Gemini Studios

- Theatrical release poster
- Directed by: Murugadasa
- Screenplay by: Kothamangalam Subbu; Ki. Raa. Nayina
- Based on: Gnana Soundari by Nawab Rajamanikkam Pillai
- Produced by: Nayina
- Starring: M. K. Radha; Susheela; T. R. Ramachandran; P. Kannamba
- Cinematography: M. Natarajan
- Edited by: N. R. Krishnaswamy
- Music by: M. D. Parthasarathy
- Production company: Gemini Studios
- Release date: 18 June 1948
- Country: India
- Language: Tamil

Gnana Soundari is a 1948 Indian Tamil-language film produced by Gemini Studios. A film by the same name and with the same story (Gnana Soundari) but with a different cast and crew was produced by Citadel Studios and was running successfully when this film was released. This film was a flop and the producer withdrew it from circuits.

== Plot ==
Gnanam is the only daughter of King Dharmar. From her childhood she is an ardent devotee of Mary, mother of Jesus. She is ill-treated by her step-mother. She grows into a beautiful young girl and becomes Gnana Soundari. Her step-mother plans to kill her while the king is away. Arranged by the step-mother, Gnana Soundari is taken to a forest by goons. However, instead of killing her, the goons amputate both her arms and abandon her. A prince from a neighboring state comes to the forest for hunting and finds Gnana Soundari. He rescues and then falls in love with her. In spite of his father's objection, the prince marries Gnana Soundari. But she has not divulged her true identity to him. Her father's kingdom is attacked by enemies and the Prince, as a neighbor, helps her father in fighting off the attacking army. The father (king) learns the whole story. Mary restores the arms to Gnana Soundari.

== Cast ==
- P. Kannamba as Gnana Soundari
- M. K. Radha as Pilendran
- V. S. Susheela as Arokkiyam
- T. R. Ramachandran as Michael
- L. Narayana Rao as Simiyon
- T. E. Krishnamachariar as Dharmar
- T. N. Meenakshi as Lenal
- Velayutham as Anthony
- Subbaiah Pillai as Michael

== Release and reception ==
Gnana Soundari was released on 18 June 1948. The Indian Express praised the performances of the lead cast, Kannamba's singing, the settings, photography and recording, though the critic felt Radha was underutilised. According to historian Venkatesh Ramakrishnan, viewers disliked the film in which the characters spoke in "Brahmanical" accent for a Christian-themed film and broke the chairs of the theatre. The film stopped screening, and Vasan subsequently announced that it would not be screened in any theatre in the future. Venkatesh Ramakrishnan believes he later burnt the negatives of the film.
