= Karaikkal Ammaiyar (1943 film) =

- Directed by: C. V. Raman
- Based on: Karaikkal Ammaiyar a Hindu Women saint of 6th C.E.
- Produced by: C. V. Raman; Kandhan Company
- Music by: Papanasam Sivan
- Production company: Kandhan Company
- Release date: 1943
- Country: India
- Language: Tamil

Karaikkal Ammaiyar is a 1943 Indian Tamil language film based on the life of a Hindu woman saint of the same name, who lived around the 6th century C.E. The film was produced and directed by C. V. Raman. The film stars V. A. Chellappa, B. Saraswathi, K. Sarangapani, K. R. Chellam, Kali N. Rathnam and T. S. Jaya.

== Plot ==
Karaikkal Ammaiyar was a real person who was born and lived in Karaikkal during the Chola period. Her birth name was Punithavathi. She was a devotee of Lord Shiva from her childhood and was always chanting "NamasShivaya, mantra of Shiva. She was married to a wealthy merchant. An incident in the family makes the husband to realise that his wife is a divinely person and calls her "Ammaiyar that means mother. He left her and married another woman. Punithavathi begged Lord Shiva to give her a different form so that no man will seek her with passion. He grants her wish and she became a form of fiery Kali. Lord Shiva asks her to come to his abode, Mt. Kailash. She goes there walking all the way with her hands.

== Cast ==
Adapted from the list appearing in The Hindu review article.

Male cast

- V. A. Chellappa
- K. Sarangapani
- Kali N. Rathnam
- T. S. Durairaj
- Kolathu Mani

Male cast (Contd.)

- M. E. Madhavan
- P. Ramaiah Sastri
- Kunchithapaadham Pillai

Female cast

- B. Saraswathi
- K. R. Chellam
- T. S. Jaya
- Baby Kalyani
- Shantha Devi

Dance

- S. Nataraj
- A. R. Sakunthala

== Production ==
The film was produced, in association with Kandhan Company, by C. V. Raman who also directed it and was shot at Kandhan Studios in Coimbatore.

A dance drama Shiva Thandavam was performed by S. Natraj and A. R. Sakunthala who were a famous pair those days.

== Soundtrack ==
Papanasam Sivan composed the music for the film. Saint Karaikkal Ammaiyar's composition hymns were used in the film.

== Release ==
The film did not do well at box-office, however A. P. Nagarajan made a film on Ammaiyar again in 1973. Randor Guy of The Hindu wrote "Remembered for the familiar tale, impressive performances of Chellappa, Saraswathi, and the dance drama by Nataraj-Sakunthala".
