= Usha Parinayam (1961 film) =

- DVD cover of Usha Parinayam film
- Directed by: Kadaru Nagabhushanam
- Written by: Sadasivabrahmam; Samudrala
- Produced by: Kadaru Nagabhushanam
- Starring: Tadepalli Lakshmi Kanta Rao; S. V. Ranga Rao; Jamuna
- Music by: Saluri Hanumantha Rao
- Release date: 1961
- Country: India
- Language: Telugu

Usha Parinayam was a film adaptation of the play Usha Parinayam. The movie is remake of hindi movie Harihar Bhakti (1956).It was made by Kadaru Nagabhushanam under Rajarajeswari films. It starred Tadepalli Lakshmi Kanta Rao as Anirudha, S. V. Ranga Rao as Banasura and Jamuna as Lady Usha. Rajanala Kaleswara Rao, Kannamba, Mukkamala, Relangi and Peketi Sivaram played the other main roles.

== Cast ==
- Tadepalli Lakshmi Kanta Rao as Anirudha
- S. V. Ranga Rao as Banasura
- Kannamba as wife of Banasura
- Jamuna as Lady Usha
- P. Suribabu as Narada
- Suryakala as Chitralekha
- Rajanala Kaleswara Rao as Lord Shiva
- Kalyanam Raghuramaiah as Lord Krishna
- Relangi as Kolahalam
- Mukkamala Krishna Murthy as Rajaguru
- Mikkilineni as Indra

== Soundtrack ==
There are 18 songs and poems in the film.

1. "Aathadu Vishnumurthy Paramatmudu" (Padyam) (Singer: P. Suribabu)
2. "Andhaalu Chindeti Ee Vanaseemalo" (Singer: K. Jamuna Rani group)
3. "Bana Nandhana Ushabala (Padyam)" (Singer: P. Suribabu)
4. "Bhakthi Paasambu" - S. Hanumantha Rao
5. "Brathikee Phalambemi Ekakinai Itupai" (Singers: P. B. Srinivas and K. Jamuna Rani)
6. "Devaa Hara Hara... Jaya Mahadeva Shambo" (Singers: Madhavapeddi Satyam, P. Leela and others)
7. "Karuna Rasabharitha" - P. Leela
8. "Madhukaita" (Padyam) - S. Hanumantha Rao
9. "Mana Prema Gaatha" (Lyricist: Sadasiva Brahmam; Singers: Ghantasala and P. Leela)
10. "Naakun Muddu" - S. Hanumantha Rao
11. "Ninne Valachithinoi" - K. Rani
12. "Nyayamidena Chanduruda" (Lyricist: Samudrala; Singer: P. Susheela)
13. "O Javaraala (Adhigo Mana Prema)" - P. B. Sreenivas, K. Jamuna Rani
14. "Ottesuko Ottesuko" (Lyricist: Sadasiva Brahmam; Singers: Pithapuram Nageswara Rao and K. Jamuna Rani)
15. "Saraseejadhalanayana" (Lyricist: Sadasiva Brahmam; Singer: Kalyanam Raghuramaiah)
16. "Subhodayamuna" - K. Jamuna Rani
17. "Suralu Munivarulaina" - Kalyanam Raghuramayya
18. "Vande Sambhum and Dandakum" - Madhavapeddi Sathyam
