= Thaali Bhagyam =

- Theatrical release poster
- Directed by: K. B. Nagabhushanam
- Screenplay by: Aaroor Dass
- Story by: Sundararaman
- Produced by: K. B. Nagabhushanam
- Starring: M. G. Ramachandran; B. Saroja Devi; M. N. Nambiar
- Cinematography: A. Shanmugam
- Edited by: M. V. Rajan
- Music by: K. V. Mahadevan
- Production company: Varalakshmi Pictures
- Release date: 27 August 1966
- Running time: 180 minutes
- Country: India
- Language: Tamil

Thaali Bhagyam (transl. Luck of the Thaali) is a 1966 Indian Tamil-language film produced and directed by K. B. Nagabhushanam. The film, starring M. G. Ramachandran, B. Saroja Devi and M. N. Nambiar, was released on 27 August 1966.

== Plot ==
The families of Nallasivam and Murugan have been neighbours for generations. Nallasivam is nurturing his wish to give his daughter Valli in marriage to Murugan. Meanwhile, a bride search for Nallasivam is on and Murugan accompanies Nallasivam along with others to see a bride, Kamalam. Kamalam, thinking Murugan is the groom agrees to the marriage, and finds it is otherwise on the day of the marriage. In a passionate moment, Kamalam misbehaves with Murugan, which is seen by Namchivayam, a tax collector. Namchivayam takes this opportunity to blackmail Kamalam and get her to do things against Murugan. How Murugan foils their plans and how finally truth prevails is what the film is all about.

== Cast ==
- M. G. Ramachandran as Muruga alias Murugan
- B. Saroja Devi as Valli
- M. N. Nambiar as Namchivayam
- Nagesh as Singaran, Namchivayam's brother-in-law
- C. R. Parthiban
- S. V. Subbaiah as Nallasivam
- V. Nagayya as Kamalam's father
- M. N. Rajam as Kamalam
- M. V. Rajamma as Parvathi
- Manorama as Anjalai
- M. S. S. Packiyam as Chellam, Namchivayam's wife
- Rushyendramani as Kamalam's mother
- S. M. Thirupadhiswamy as Singapore Sivalingam
- N. S. Natarajan as Rangan, bandit

== Production ==
M. G. Ramachandran initially wanted M. A. Thirumugam to direct the film; however, K. B. Nagabhushanam insisted on directing, as well as producing.

== Soundtrack ==
The music was composed by K. V. Mahadevan and lyrics were written by Vaali.

Song	Singers	Length
"Annai Illama"	P. Susheela	04:49
"Kann Pattathu Konjam"	T. M. Soundararajan & P. Susheela	04:57
"Ullam Oru Kovil"	T. M. Soundararajan & P. Susheela	02:58
"Ippadiye Irundu"	T. M. Soundararajan & P. Susheela	04:14

== Release and reception ==
Thaali Bhagyam was released on 27 August 1966. The Indian Express wrote that the film "has a plausible enough theme of love and duty but it is needlessly cluttered with shoddy songs, unrealistic dialogue and melodramatic situations". The film ran for over 300 days at Liberty theatre in Madras.
