= Harischandra (1944 film) =

1944 film by Kadaru Nagabhushanam

- Theatrical release poster
- Directed by: K. Nagabhushanam
- Screenplay by: T. C. Vadivel Nayakar
- Starring: Chinnappa; Kannamba; Krishnan; Mathuram
- Cinematography: Kamal Ghosh
- Edited by: N. K. Gopal
- Music by: S. V. Venkatraman; S. Rajeswara Rao
- Production company: Sri Rajarajeswari Pictures
- Distributed by: Gemini Studios
- Release date: 14 January 1944
- Country: India
- Language: Tamil

Harischandra is a 1944 Indian Tamil-language film directed by K. Nagabhushanam and written by T. C. Vadivel Nayakar, starring the director's wife P. Kannamba and P. U. Chinnappa. It is based on the legend of King Harishchandra.

== Cast ==
The list was adapted from the film titles

- Chinnappa as Harischandran
- Kannamba as Chandramadhi
- Krishnan as Kalakandan
- Mathuram as Kalakandi
- R. Balasubramaniam as Viswamitra
- L. Narayana Rao as Nakshathreyan
- M. R. Saminathan as Veera Bahu

- M. G. Ramachandran as Sathyakeerthi
- Kothamangalam Vasu as Vashistar
- Master Sethuraman as Logidasan
- Rajagopala Iyer as Paramasivan
- P. S. Chandra as Chelli
- Mangalam, Yogambal as Bar Girls
- Sarathambal as Parvathi

== Production ==
Art was done by Hari Babu. Choreography and cinematography were handled by Meenakshi Sundaram Pillai and Kamal Ghosh, respectively.

== Soundtrack ==
The songs were composed by S. V. Venkatraman and the background music composed by S. Rajeswara Rao. C. A. Lakshmana Das wrote the lyrics. The songs were recorded by B. Ranga Rao.
