= Ithaya Geetham =

- Theatrical release poster
- Directed by: Joseph Thaliath Jr.
- Screenplay by: Naanjil T. N. Rajappa
- Story by: Joseph Thaliath Jr.
- Produced by: Joseph Thaliath Jr.
- Starring: T. R. Mahalingam; T. R. Rajakumari
- Cinematography: Jitten Banerjee
- Edited by: S. A. Murugesan
- Music by: S. V. Venkatraman
- Production company: Citadel Film Corporation
- Release date: 29 July 1950
- Country: India
- Language: Tamil

Ithaya Geetham is a 1950 Indian Tamil-language historical romance film written, directed and produced by Joseph Thaliath Jr. The film stars T.R. Mahalingam and T. R. Rajakumari. It was released on 29 July 1950.

== Plot ==
A king, on his deathbed, requests his friend to take care of the queen (Rajalakshmi) and their daughter (Rajakumari). The friend has two sons. While the elder son (Veerappa) goes to fight a battle, the younger son (Mahalingam) and the princess fall in love. The elder son returns victoriously and claims the hand of the princess. The princess vacillates. The younger brother goes to another battle but gets injured. The princess realises her folly and helps in the treatment of the younger brother. The two brothers decide to settle on a duel. The younger brother wins and marries the princess.

== Cast ==
Credits adapted from The Hindu review article and from the song book.

Male cast

- T. R. Mahalingam as Jeevan
- P. S. Veerappa as Prathaban
- K. Sarangapani as Lala
- M. G. Chakrapani as Minister
- C. V. Nayagam as Udaya Singh
- C. V. V. Panthulu as Ananda Singh
- K. P. Kamakshi as Dhathan
- Thirupathi as Ananda Singh's minister
- Stunt Somu & Battling Swaminathan

Female cast

- T. R. Rajakumari as Thara
- T. P. Rajalakshmi as Thara's mother
- V. Susheela as Ragini
- T. S. Jaya as Leela

Dance

- Lalitha & Padmini

== Production ==
Filming took place mostly at Citadel Studios in Kilpauk. The film was later dubbed into Hindi under the title Jeevan Tara.

== Soundtrack ==
Music was composed by S. V. Venkatraman. Two songs "Vaanulaavum Tharai Nee En Ithaya Geethame" and "Odi Vaa Venmugil Poley", both sung by T. R. Mahalingam and T. R. Rajakumarai, became popular.

Song	Singer/s	Lyricist	Duration(m:ss)
"Vaanulaavum Tharai Nee En Ithaya Geethame"	T. R. Mahalingam & T. R. Rajakumari	Kambadasan	03:03
"Assai Kiliye Azhaitthu Vaaraai"	T. R. Mahalingam		03:24
"Juma Juma Jum Jum"	P. A. Periyanayaki & P. Leela		07:27
"Odi Vaa Venmugil Poley"	T. R. Mahalingam & T. R. Rajakumari	K. P. Kamatchisundaram	02:48
"Oho Nee Summaa Summaa"	K. Sarangapani & T. S. Jaya		03:20
"Janani Sri Goweri Dhesam"	P. A. Periyanayaki		04:08
"Jeyame Ini Mele Bayamillai Ini"	T. R. Mahalingam & K. Sarangapani		03:21

== Reception ==
Historian Randor Guy opines that the film "did not prove to be a box office success as expected", although he praised the "impressive production values, tuneful music and the stunning Rajakumari."
