= Thirumalisai Alvar (film) =

Thirumalisai Alwar
- Poster
- Directed by: T. S. Kotni; P. S. Chettiar
- Screenplay by: P. S. Chettiar
- Produced by: M. Chakravarthi Iyengar; C. Kannan Pillai
- Starring: M. M. Dandapani Desigar; Trichur Premavathi; M. S. Devasena
- Cinematography: R. R. Chandran
- Music by: S. V. Venkatraman; T. R. Ramanathan
- Production company: Kanna Films – Shobhanachala Studios (later Venus Studios)
- Release date: 20 August 1948
- Running time: 14541 ft
- Country: India
- Language: Tamil

Thirumalisai Alwar or Thirumazhisai Aazhwar is a Tamil language film starring M. M. Dandapani Desigar. The film was released on 20 August 1948.

== Plot ==
Thirumazhisai is a sacred town near Chennai and the film narrates its mythological tale about a venerated sage being seduced by a temptress sent by Indra, a major deity in Hinduism. She becomes pregnant. The foetus is removed from her womb and thrown into the bushes. It is saved by the deity and becomes a male child who later blossoms into the Aazhvaar.

== Cast ==
Male cast

- M. M. Dandapani Desikar
- Vidwan Srinivasan
- P. B. Rangachari
- S. V. Subbaiah
- R. Balasubramaniam
- T. S. Durairaj
- D. V. Narayanaswami

Male cast (Contd.)

- M. R. Swaminathan
- K. K. Perumal
- Master Padmanabhan
- T. K. Kalyanam
- A. K. Srinivasan
- K. R. Rajagopalan
- M. S. Raghavan

Female cast

- Trichur Premavathi
- M. S. Devasena
- P. K. Saraswathi
- P. S. Sivabhagyam
- K. S. Angamuthu
- C. R. Lakshmi Devi
- K. K. Radha

== Production ==
During the 1940s, two friends, M. Chakravarthi Iyengar of the famous business family of old Madras city, MD Brothers, and a successful automobile spare parts dealer C. Kannabiran Pillai, joined hands to produce this movie based on the life of Thirumazhisai Aazhvaar and

== Soundtrack ==
The music was composed by S. V. Venkatraman. Lyrics by Papanasam Sivan, S.D.S.Yogi and T.K. Sundara Vathiyar.

No.	Song	Singers	Lyrics	Length (m:ss)
1	"Naaraayanaa	M. M. Dandapani Desigar	Papanasam Sivan	01:33
2	"Giridhari"	P. Leela	Papanasam Sivan	01:56
3	"Nonthavar"	M. S. Velappan	Papanasam Sivan	02:15
4	"Kani Kannan"	M. M. Dandapani Desigar	Papanasam Sivan	01:23
5	"Kannan Naamam"	M. M. Dandapani Desigar	Papanasam Sivan	03:12
6	"Pathiyavane"	M. M. Dandapani Desigar	Papanasam Sivan	02:20
7	"Indre Pirantha"	M. M. Dandapani Desigar	Papanasam Sivan	02:56
8	"Kuvalayathala"	M. M. Dandapani Desigar	Papanasam Sivan	02:26
9	"Vaaraamal"	M. M. Dandapani Desigar	Papanasam Sivan	04:42
10	"Thanthayum Nee"	M. M. Dandapani Desigar	Papanasam Sivan	04:02
11	"Krishna Muraari"	P. B. Rangachari	Papanasam Sivan	01:54
12	"Yezhaigal"	M. M. Dandapani Desigar	Papanasam Sivan	04:31
13	"Saantham"	M. M. Dandapani Desigar	Papanasam Sivan	03:24

== Trivia ==
Remembered for the music of Dhandapani Desikar and the religious tale associated with the Aazhvaar
