= Gnana Soundari (Citadel film) =

1948 Indian film

- Theatrical release poster
- Directed by: F. Nagoor; Joseph Thaliath Jr.
- Screenplay by: Nanjil Nadu T. N. Rajappa
- Story by: F. Nagoor; Joseph Thaliath Jr.
- Produced by: F. Nagoor; Joseph Thaliath Jr.
- Starring: T. R. Mahalingam; M. V. Rajamma
- Cinematography: Jiten Bannerji; V. Selvaraj
- Edited by: V. B. Nataraj
- Music by: S. V. Venkatraman; M. S. Gnanamani
- Production company: Newtone Studio
- Distributed by: Citadel Film Corporation Ltd.
- Release date: 21 May 1948
- Running time: 183 minutes
- Country: India
- Language: Tamil

Gnana Soundari is a 1948 Indian Tamil-language film written, produced and directed by the duo F. Nagoor and Joseph Thaliath Jr. The film stars T. R. Mahalingam, and M. V. Rajamma in lead roles, with D. Balasubramaniam, Sivabhagyam, Lalitha and Padmini playing supporting roles. The film revolves around Gnana Soundari, daughter of King Dharmar who is ill-treated by her stepmother Lenal. In order to get rid of her, Lenal sends her to a forest. In the process, Soundari loses both of her hands and she is saved by prince Pilenthiran.

The film was adapted from a stage play conducted by Nawab Rajamanickam, which was itself adapted from a Christian folk tale. The film's screenplay was written by Nanjil Nadu T. N. Rajappa. The film's soundtrack was composed by S. V. Venkatraman. Jithin Banerjee and Selvaraj handled the cinematography. The film was edited by V. B. Nagaraj. Gnana Soundari was made with an estimated budget of ₹30,000 with a final film reel length of 5,264 metres (17,270 ft). Development of the film began when Citadel Pictures decided to adapt the film while S. S. Vasan directing another version of the same play at that time. The film was released on 21 May 1948 with this version being successful while the version of Vasan failed.

== Cast ==
Male cast

- T. R. Mahalingam as Pilendiran
- D. Balasubramaniam as Dharmar
- C. V. Nayagam as Simion
- P. G. Venkatesan as Michael (Oracle)
- Pulimootai Ramasami as Anthony
- Buffoon Shanmugam as Susai

Female cast

- M. V. Rajamma as Gnana Soundari
- P. S. Sivabhagyam as Lenal
- B. Saradambal as Bhagyam
- Baby Rajamani as Young Gnana Soundari
- P. R. Mangalam as Arogyam
- Lalitha-Padmini as Palace Dancers

== Production ==
F. Nagoor and Joseph Thaliath Jr., son of a judicial officer in Trivandrum decided to produce and direct the film based on a stage play conducted by Nawab Rajamanickam which itself adapted from a Christian folk tale. (Note: Both Dhananjayan and Randor Guy does not mention the name of stage play and name of folk tale) During the same time, S. S. Vasan announced making the film adaptation of same stage play for which he had cast M. K. Radha and Kannamba in lead roles. S. V. Venkatraman composed the film's music and Jithin Banerjee and Selvaraj were the film's cinematographers.

The film was edited by Nagaraj while Nagoor was the film's art director. The film's screenplay was written by NanjilNadu T. N. Rajappa. The producers had originally chosen Bhanumathi for the titular character. However she opted out as she felt uncomfortable shooting with her hands being tied back for many scenes. Kannada actress M. V. Rajamma was chosen for the role. Makeup man Haribabu made her look young as she was elder than T. R. Mahalingam. To develop the scenes of lead character struggling in forest, makers watched a Hollywood film on Jesus Christ and developed the scenes by getting inspired from the film. (Note: Dhananjayan does not mention the name of Hollywood film)

The film was made on a budget of shoestring budget of ₹30,000 (worth ₹2.1 crore in 2021 prices) with Rajamma being paid ₹1,500 and Mahalingam ₹5,000 with additional amount of ₹2,500. It became the first Tamil film where a song sequence presented the life of Christ on screen.

== Soundtrack ==
As per film titles, the film's soundtrack was composed by S. V. Venkatraman. M. S. Gnanamani composed music for 3 songs. Lyrics were penned by Kambadasan, Balasundara Kavi, Papanasam Sivan, K. R. Sarangapani, T. N. Rajappa and K. D. Santhanam. The song "Arultharum Devamatha" was well received and it is a cult classic. The song was sung by P. A. Periyanayaki and young Jikki. Songs are from the song book: The song Arunothayaanandhame penned by Papanasam Sivan was set as a Ragamaliga comprising Kambodhi, Simmendra Madhyamam and Sama ragas. Lyricist details taken from the film's credits.(See External links).

No	Songs	Singer	Lyrics	Music	Length (m:ss)
1	"Malar Poongavinile Vanthu Onraayi Koodi"	Jikki	Balasundara Kavi	M. S. Gnanamani	
2	"Ullasamaga Vazhuven"	P. S. Sivabhagyam	Kambadasan	S. V. Venkataraman	
3	"Arul Tharum Devamathave Aadhiye Inbajothiye"	Jikki, P. A. Periyanayaki	Kambadasan	S. V. Venkataraman	3:06
4	"Arunothayaanandhame"	T. R. Mahalingam	Papanasam Sivan	M. S. Gnanamani	3:25
5	"Vettunda Kaigal Vedhanai Kodene"	P. A. Periyanayaki	K. R. Sarangapani	S. V. Venkataraman	02:04
6	"Mana Mohanane"	P. A. Periyanayaki, T. R. Mahalingam	Kambadasan	S. V. Venkataraman	6:16
7	"Vanithamaniye Mounameno"	T. R. Mahalingam	Kambadasan	S. V. Venkataraman	
8	"Kadhalil Kananum Inbam Melam"	P. A. Periyanayaki, T. R. Mahalingam	Kambadasan	S. V. Venkataraman	2:48
9	"Jegamel Naan Ini Bhagyavaane"	T. R. Mahalingam	Kambadasan	S. V. Venkataraman	2:59
10	"Vaasanaiyaana Malar"	P. R. Mangalam	Kambadasan	S. V. Venkataraman	
11	"Kulamamani Chelvare Thalelo"	P. A. Periyanayaki, Chorus	Kambadasan	S. V. Venkataraman	2:25
12	"Nenjame Nee Anjadhe"	P. G. Venkatesan	T. N. Rajappa	S. V. Venkataraman	3:09
13	"Matha Nin Deva Tharisiname"	P. A. Periyanayaki	Kambadasan	S. V. Venkataraman	3:38
14	"Vaazhvinil En Uyir Vadivaana"	T. R. Mahalingam	Kambadasan	M. S. Gnanamani	
15	"Jeeviya Bhagyame Santham"	P. A. Periyanayaki	Kambadasan	S. V. Venkataraman	3:06
16	"Mannile Kadalil Poyi Marainthayo"	T. R. Mahalingam	K. D. Santhanam	S. V. Venkataraman	2:38

== Release and reception ==
Gnana Soundari was released on 21 May 1948. The Indian Express wrote, "M. V. Rajamma plays the title role creditably, exciting the sympathy of the audience by her characterisation of the ingenuous princess in the very many pathetic situations that abound in the play". Joseph Thaliath Jr. had to release the film on his own at Paragon theatre as part of sharing revenue basis since no distributor were willing to buy the film as they felt Vasan's version was larger in appeal. However the film of Vasan failed at box office as audience could not accept characters speaking in a Brahmin accent and this version was well received at box office. S. S. Vasan, withdrew his film from the theatres as a respect to the tremendous victory of the Citadel version.

== Bibliography ==
- Dhananjayan, G. (2014). Pride of Tamil Cinema: 1931 to 2013. Blue Ocean Publishers. ISBN 978-93-84301-05-7.
