= Manohara (film) =

1954 film by L. V. Prasad

- Theatrical release poster
- Directed by: L. V. Prasad
- Screenplay by: M. Karunanidhi
- Based on: Manohara by Pammal Sambandha Mudaliar
- Produced by: M. Somasundaram
- Starring: Sivaji Ganesan; T. R. Rajakumari; P. Kannamba; Girija
- Cinematography: P. Ramaswamy
- Edited by: M. A. Thirumugam
- Music by: S. V. Venkatraman; T. R. Ramanathan
- Production company: Manohar Pictures
- Release dates: 3 March 1954 (Tamil); 3 June 1954 (Telugu, Hindi)
- Running time: 172 minutes
- Country: India
- Languages: Tamil; Telugu

Manohara is a 1954 Indian Tamil-language historical fantasy film directed by L. V. Prasad and written by M. Karunanidhi. Starring Sivaji Ganesan, T. R. Rajakumari, P. Kannamba and Girija, the film was based on the play of the same name by Pammal Sambandha Mudaliar. It was released on 3 March 1954. The film was simulatenously shot in Telugu under the same title and dubbed in Hindi as Manohar. Those versions were released on 3 June 1954.

== Plot ==
Kesarivarman, an artiste, comes to the court of king Purushothaman, along with his wife Vasanthasenai to perform. The king falls in love with Vasanthasenai. To get rid of her husband and be with the king, Vasanthasenai mixes poison in Kesari's milk. Kesari dies, but returns as an invisible man with the help of a sage. He seeks revenge. Purushothaman is already married to queen Padmavathi and has a son Manoharan alias Manohara, but he becomes attracted to Vasanthasenai and starts living with her.

Padmavathi becomes angry with the king, and vows not to see him again till he separates from Vasanthasenai. Vasanthasenai, pregnant with Kesari's child, convinces Purushothaman the child belongs to him. The child is born and named Vasanthan. Years roll by and Vasanthasenai influences Purushothaman in every decision, which annoys Manoharan. Manoharan respects his mother and never disobeys her. Padmavathi makes him promise that he would never harm Vasanthasenai as such an act would affect her husband's happiness. She orders him to restore the honour of their kingdom by retrieving the prestigious throne which was seized by king Muthuvijayan.

Manohara and his friend Rajapriyan attack the kingdom of Muthuvijayan; not only does he get the throne back, he also falls for Muthuvijayan's daughter Vijaya, who tries to kill him to protect the country's honour. He marries her and returns to his kingdom with her. Manoharan becomes upset on seeing that instead of his mother, Vasanthasenai is accompanying the king to the prestigious throne. When he accuses her, she abuses his mother, prompting him to raise his hand to attack her. However, remembering his promise, he stops.

Purushothaman, angry on seeing Manoharan's act, orders him to apologise. Manoharan refuses and is sentenced to death by King Purusothaman. Even his mother's pleas to the king fail. Vasanthasenai also hatches a conspiracy, and gets Padmavathi and Vijaya imprisoned on false charges. When Manoharan is taken in a chariot for his execution, the invisible Kesari saves him. Manoharan, with the help of the minister Sathyaseelar and Rajapriyan, re-enters the palace disguised as a messenger Atchayan and works under Vasanthasenai.

Ukrasenan, an opponent of Purushothaman, enters the palace disguised as a sage, on the invitation of Vasanthasenai. Manoharan, still disguised, makes Purushothaman see Vasanthasenai and Ukrasenan in a compromising position in the bedroom; when Purushothaman questions her, she imprisons him too. Purushothaman realises his mistakes and feels regret. Vijaya delivers a child in prison. Vasanthasenai orders that the child be brought to the Court and killed. "Atchayan", in his anxiety to see his newborn, visits the prison. Meanwhile, the real Atchayan escapes and meets Ukrasenan. They understand the truth and come rushing to the prison to see the disguised Manoharan with his child. He is arrested and brought to court.

Vasanthasenai tries to kill Manoharan's child despite Padmavathi's pleas. When Padmavathi explains to Vasanthasenai why she had been patient all along, Vasanthasenai does not understand and slaps her. Enraged, Padmavathi decides it is enough of patience and time to respond, and advises Manohara to restore the honour of the family. Though he is chained to a wall, his mother's words make him powerful enough to break free and a fight ensues. Manoharan, Sathyaseelar, Rajapriyan and their army attack the queen's army and all the enemies are eliminated. Kesari comes to Manoharan's help in the process. When Vasanthasenai kills Vasanthan, she is taken by Kesari for the ultimate punishment in his hideout. Purushothaman is released and unites with his family.

== Cast ==
Male

- Sivaji Ganesan as Manoharan (Manohara in Telugu)
- Sadhasiva Rao as Purushothaman
- S. A. Natarajan as Ukrasenan
- Javar Seetharaman as Sathyaseelar
- S. S. Rajendran as Rajapriyan
- T. V. Radhakrishnan as Vasanthan
- Pandian as Vikatan
- V. M. Ezhumalai as Doctor
- M. R. Saminathan as Buddhist Yanan
- M. K. Mustafa as Kesarivarman

Female

- T. R. Rajakumari as Vasanthasenai
- P. Kannamba as Padmavathi
- Girija as Vijaya
- P. K. Saraswathi as Vasanthasenai (drama)
- Pandari Bai as Padmavathi (drama)
- Muthulakshmi as Malini

Dance

- Kumari Kamala

== Production ==
Manohara was a play staged by Pammal Sambandha Mudaliar in the 1930s; he even acted in a film version which was released in 1930. K. R. Ramasamy successfully staged Manohara under his own banner, playing the lead actor, Sivaji Ganesan portrayed the role of the queen in the play. Jupiter Pictures announced the film adaptation of Manohara with Ramasamy in the title role and A. S. A. Sami as the director. Elangovan, was engaged to write the script. However, this project was shelved and Ganesan was brought on board. Producer signed Ganesan either for the role of Rajapriyan or Manohara. However Ganesan was keen on doing the titular character and got selected. Elangovan worked on the script for sometime under the new setup, but he was soon replaced by M. Karunanidhi. Karunanidhi rewrote Mudaliar's play, introducing changes like the climactic sequence for which he drew inspiration from Samson and Delilah, especially the part where the blind Samson pushes the pillars down. L. V. Prasad was selected to direct the film.

== Soundtrack ==
The music was composed by S. V. Venkatraman and T. R. Ramanathan. Ramanathan composed the songs Singara Paingkiliye Pesu and Nilaavile Ullaasamaaga Aadalaam.

Tamil Songs

Song	Singers	Lyrics	Length
"Singaara Paingkiliye Pesu"	A. M. Rajah & Radha Jayalakshmi	Udumalai Narayana Kavi	04:14
"Ennai Paar Ennazhagai Paaru"	T. V. Rathnam & S. V. Venkatraman		04:46
"Nilaavile Ullaasamaaga Aadalaam"	T. A. Mothi & T. V. Rathnam		02:59
"Pozhudhu Pularndhadhe"	T. R. Rajakumari		02:00
"Sandhegam Illai Sandhegam Illai"	S. V. Venkatraman & C. S. Pandiyan		02:00
"Inbanaalidhe Idhayam Kaanudhe"	Jikki & L.R Eswari		03:06
"Vasantha Vizhaa Osantha Thiruvizhaa"	Jikki, T. V. Rathnam, S. V. Venkatraman & C. S. Pandiyan		06:47
"Vasantha Vizhaa Osantha Thiruvizhaa"	T. V. Rathnam		02:35
"Kaathal Kondaadukiraar"	Radha Jayalakshmi		02:35
	Radha Jayalakshmi		01:06

Telugu Songs

Song	Singers	Length (m:ss)
"Kannulalo Vennelalo"	A. M. Rajah & Jikki	04:14
"Andalu Chandalu Kannaa Raa"	Jikki, Subramanyam & A. M. Rajah	04:46
"Paadave Preyasi Teeyagaa"	T. A. Mothi & Jikki	02:59
"Thela Thelavaare"	Jikki	02:00
"Sandeham Ledu Sandeham Ledu"	A. M. Rajah & Pithapuram Nageswara Rao	02:00
"Ravoyi Ravoyi"	Jikki	03:06
"Vana Mahothsavam Vasantha Thina Mahothsavam"	Jikki, Radha Jayalakshmi, Pithapuram Nageswara Rao & Subramanyam	06:47
"Thivari Ramuni"	Madhavapeddi Satyam	01:30
"Andamuraku Choochi"	Madhavapeddi Satyam	00:41
"Andaala Rathini"	Jikki	02:32
"Pranaya Vilasamule"	Radha Jayalakshmi	02:35
"Manahinanai Avamanamotuna"	Radha Jayalakshmi	01:06

Hindi Songs

Song	Singers
"Main Toh Nainon Mein"	Lata Mangeshkar
"Rajni Hai Taron Bhari"	Lata Mangeshkar, T. A. Mothi
"Doob Gaye Sab Aas Ke Tare"	Sandhya Mukherjee
"Rut Hai Suhani Raat Jawan Hai"	Sandhya Mukherjee, Hemant Kumar
"Maharaj Maharaj Jaago Ji Maharaj"	Asha Bhosle
"Aayi Basant Ritu Aayi Bahaar"	Sandhya Mukherjee
"Balma Man Mein Phool Khila"	
"Sukh Bhari Duniya Meri Barbad"	Sandhya Mukherjee
"Woh Aa Gaye Do Matwale Do Dilwale"	Shamshad Begum

== Release and reception ==
Manohara was released on 3 March 1954. Ananda Vikatan wrote "Manohara is an example if there is a good script combined with lively dialogues and powerful acting, the public will appreciate and love such films". According to historian G. Dhananjayan, the film became a success due to the performances of Ganesan and Kannamba and dialogues by Karunanidhi. It was later released in Telugu and Hindi with the same title. Jaggayya dubbed his voice for Sivaji Ganesan in Telugu. Aatreya wrote the dialogues for the Telugu version.

== Bibliography ==
- Dhananjayan, G. (2014). Pride of Tamil Cinema: 1931 to 2013. Blue Ocean Publishers. OCLC 898765509.
- Pillai, Swarnavel Eswaran (2015). Madras Studios: Narrative, Genre, and Ideology in Tamil Cinema. India: SAGE Publications. ISBN 978-93-5150-121-3.
- Rajadhyaksha, Ashish; Willemen, Paul (1998) [1994]. Encyclopaedia of Indian Cinema. British Film Institute and Oxford University Press. ISBN 0-19-563579-5.
