= Dakshayagnam (1962 film) =

- Theatrical release poster
- Directed by: Kadaru Nagabhushanam
- Written by: Aarudhra (dialogues)
- Produced by: Kadaru Nagabhushanam; Kannamba (Presents)
- Starring: N. T. Rama Rao; Devika; S. V. Ranga Rao
- Cinematography: Lakshman Ghore
- Edited by: N. K. Gopal
- Music by: Saluri Hanumantha Rao
- Production company: Varalakshmi Pictures
- Release date: 10 May 1962
- Running time: 157 minutes
- Country: India
- Language: Telugu

Dakshayagnam is a 1962 Indian Telugu-language Hindu mythological film, produced and directed by Kadaru Nagabhushanam under the Varalakshmi Pictures banner. It stars N. T. Rama Rao (in his 100th film), Devika, and S. V. Ranga Rao, with music composed by Saluri Hanumantha Rao. It was also dubbed in Tamil with the same title.

== Cast ==
- N. T. Rama Rao as Shiva
- Devika as Sati Devi
- S. V. Ranga Rao as Daksha
- Kannamba as Vairini
- V. Nagayya as Dadhichi Maharshi
- Rajanala as Indra
- Ramakrishna as Chandra
- Mikkilineni as Brahma
- Amwas ath as Vishnu
- Padmanabham as Daksha's Younger son
- Suri Babu as Nandi
- Raghuramaiah as Narada Maharshi
- Balakrishna as Daksha's Elder son
- Dr. Sivaramakrishnaiah
- Rajasree as Rohini
- Chayadevi
- Meena Kumari
- Vasanthi
- Ambika Sukumaran as Urvashi
- Mahankali Venkayya as Veerabhadra

== Soundtrack ==
Music composed by Saluri Hanumantha Rao. Lyrics were written by Aarudhra.

S.No	Song title	Singers	length
1	Namo Namo Nadaraja	Madhavapeddi Satyam	4:50
2	Jabilli Ohoho Jabilli	P. B. Srinivas, K. Jamuna Rani	3:08
3	Hara Hara Mahadeva	P. Suri Babu	4:06
4	Koyila Thelupavate	P. Susheela	3:38
5	Idhi Chakkani Lokam	P. B. Srinivas, S. Janaki	3:33
6	Nee Pada Samseva	P. Leela	3:02
7	Kaanaru Nee Mahima	Raghuramaiah	2:56
8	Emi Seyudu Devadeva	P. Leela	3:20
9	Karunaamoorthulu	Raghuramaiah	1:34
10	Navarasa Bhavala	P. Leela, Radha Jayalakshmi	5:33
11	Pasuvaa	Madhavapeddi Satyam	1:00
12	Kamaneeyam Kailasam	P. Susheela	2:56
13	Girija Kalyanam	P. Suribabu, Madhavapeddi Satyam, Raghuramaiah, P. Susheela	13:15
14	Mangalam Mahaniya Teja	M. Mallikarjuna Rao Bhagavathar	0:22
