= Bomma Borusa =

- Official poster
- Directed by: K. Balachander
- Written by: K. Balachander
- Produced by: Avichi Meiyappa Chettiar
- Starring: Chandra Mohan; S. Varalakshmi; Chalam; Rama Krishna; Venniradai Nirmala; Allu Rama Lingaiah; Mukkamala; Rama Prabha; Raja Babu
- Music by: R. Goverdhanam
- Distributed by: A. V. M. Productions
- Release date: 28 August 1971
- Country: India
- Language: Telugu

Bomma Borusa (transl. Heads or Tails?) is a 1971 Indian Telugu-language comedy film written and directed by K. Balachander. It is a remake of the Tamil film Poova Thalaiya, directed by K. Balachander himself. The film stars Rama Krishna, Chandra Mohan, S. Varalakshmi, Chalam, Vennira Aadai Nirmala, Allu Ramalingaiah, Mukkamala, Raja Babu and Ramaprabha. It was produced by Avichi Meiyappa Chettiar and distributed by AVM Productions. The film music was composed by R. Goverdhanam and lyrics were written by Kosaraju Raghavaiah.

== Plot ==
It is an old classical family drama. Sundaram (Ramakrishna) is a rich businessman and he has an younger brother Sekhar (Chandra Mohan), a college going guy who loves his brother so much. Sundaram's mother-in-law Parvatham (S. Varalakshmi) who cares for his assets, shows her dominating character on Sekhar and Sundaram. She bets with Sekhar that she would separate him from his brother and puts some conditions that he should not tell his brother about the bet to prove his strength. Parvatham's second son-in-law (Chalam) identifies that his mother-in-law has moved to Sundaram's house. Soon the second son-in-law comes to the house and places a bet with Parvatham that she only should reveal that he is the son-in-law of her. Since then, both of them start proving their capacity to win the bet. The film revolves around who wins the bet and how it brings about a change in Parvathamma's beliefs.

== Cast ==
Actor	Character
Chandra Mohan	Shekhar
S. Varalakshmi	Parvatamma
Chalam	Ranga
Rama Krishna	Sundaram
Vennira Aadai Nirmala	Rekha
Allu Ramalingaiah	Chidambaramsetty
Mukkamala	
Raja Babu	Appula Appa Rao
Ramaprabha	Ammaji
Vijaya Nirmala	

== Soundtrack ==
Soundtrack for this film was composed by R. Goverdhanam and lyrics were written by Kosaraju Raghavaiah.

1. "Vesukunta Chempalu Vesukunta" (male)
2. "Vesukunta Chempalu Vesukunta" (female)
3. "Bomma Borusa Pandem Veyyi Needo Naado Paicheyi"
4. "Vallu Jhillan Tunnadi"
5. "Sarile Pove Vagaladi"
