= Karaikkal Ammaiyar =

Major figure in early Tamil literature

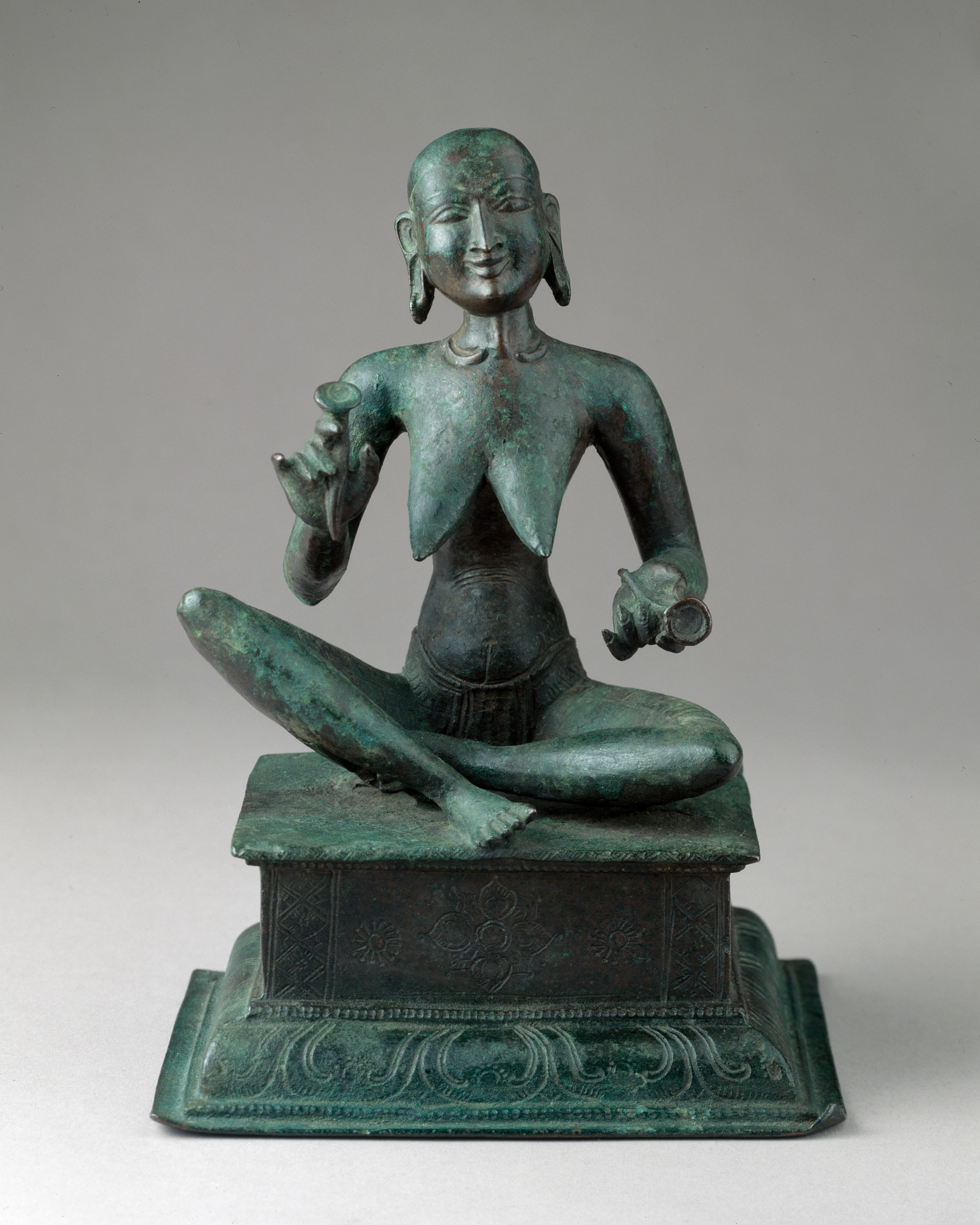
Karaikkal Ammaiyar, c. 13th century

Karaikal Ammaiyar (born Punītavatī), meaning "The Revered Mother of Karaikal", is one of the three women amongst the 63 Nayanmars and one of the greatest figures of early Tamil literature. She was also known as pēyār meaning "the ghoul-like one". She was born in Karaikal, South India, and probably lived during the 5th century CE. She was a devotee of Shiva.

== Biography ==
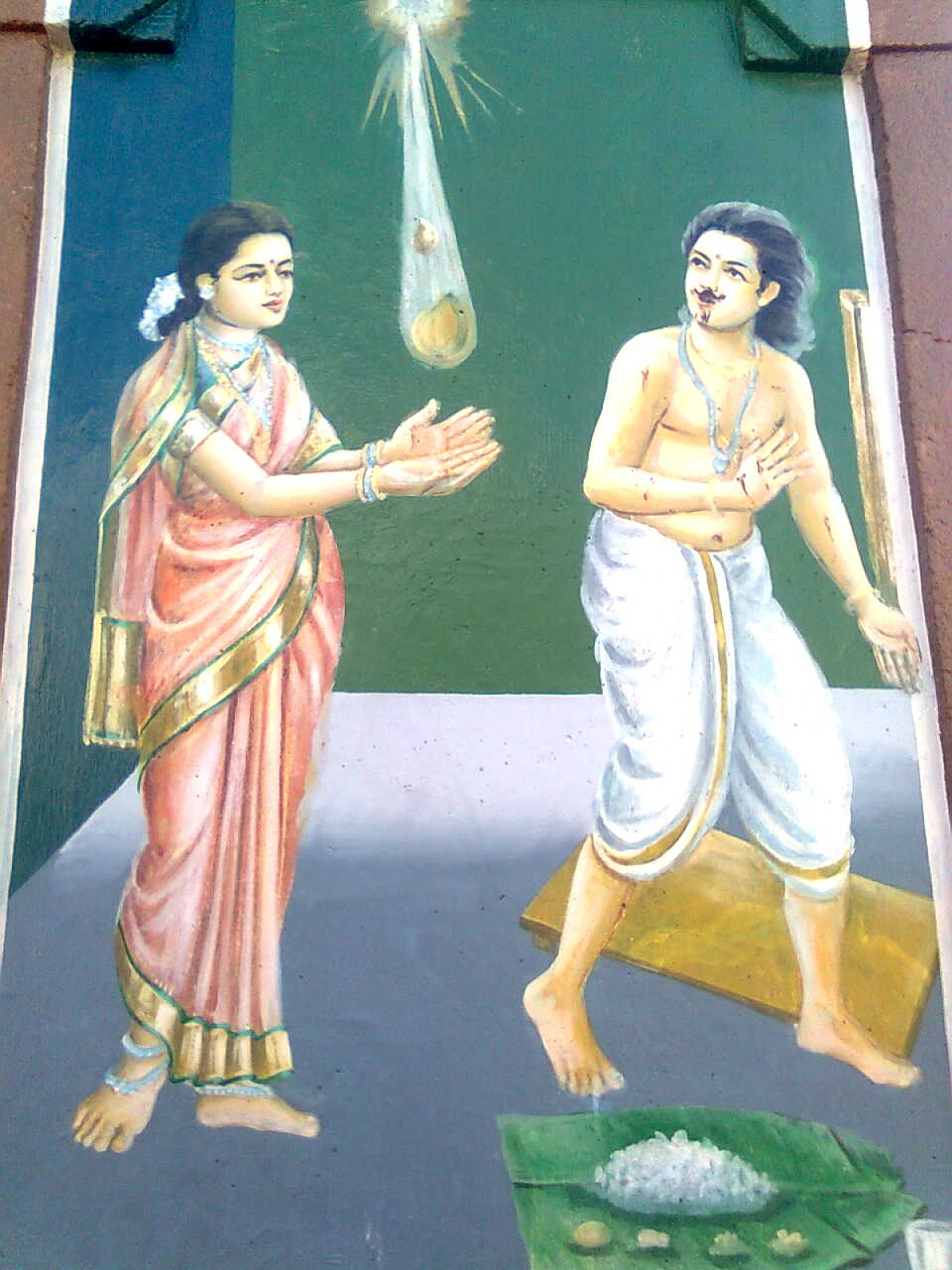
Ammaiyar gets mango from Shiva

Karaikal was a maritime trading city in Chola Nadu. Ammaiyar, whose original name was Punitavati, was born to Dhanadattan in a merchant community known as Chettiar, popular tradition linking it with the Nattukottai Nagarathar community (also known as Nattukottai Chettiar). She was married to Paramadattan, a wealthy merchant from Nagapattinam. Mangani festival in Karaikal is an annual event celebrated in honor of Karaikal Ammaiyar

== Iconography ==
Banteay Srei or Banteay Srey (Khmer: បន្ទាយស្រី [ɓɑntiəj srəj]) is a 10th-century Cambodian temple dedicated to the Hindu god Shiva. Located in the area of Angkor, it lies near the hill of Phnom Dei, 25 km (16 mi) north-east of the main group of temples that once belonged to the medieval capitals of Yasodharapura and Angkor Thom.

The second enclosure

The combat between Vāli and Sugrīva is depicted on the western gopura.

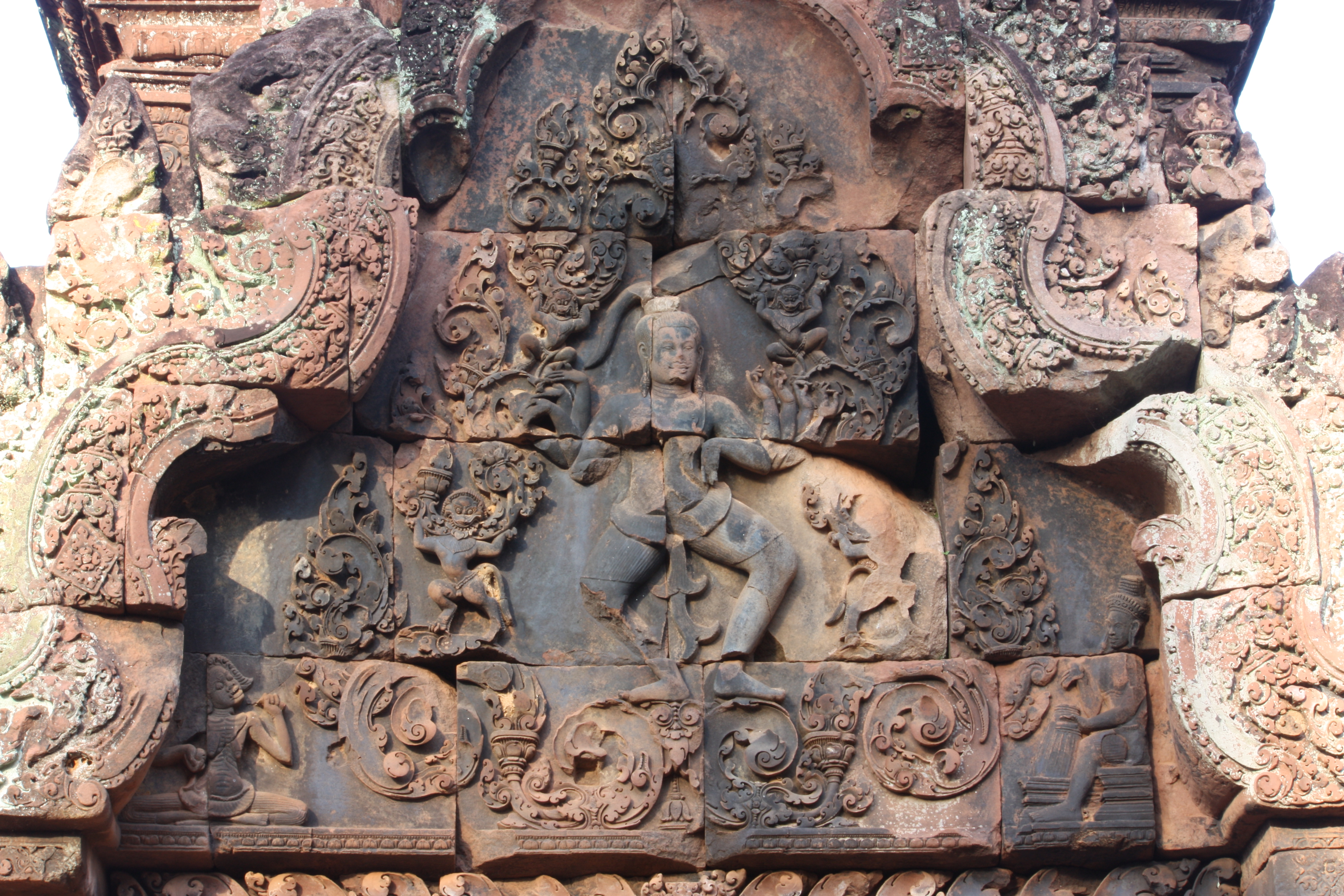
Śiva Nāṭarāja is depicted on the eastern gopura of the inner enclosure wall. Ammaiyar is shown seated on the left bottom corner.

=== The second enclosure ===
The inner enclosure wall has collapsed, leaving a gopura at the eastern end and a brick shrine at the western. The eastern pediment of the gopura shows Śiva Nataraja; the west-facing pediment has an image of Karaikal Ammaiyar, one of the three women saints amongst the sixty three Nayanmars (hounds of Śiva).

== In popular culture ==
In the Tamil film Karaikkal Ammaiyar (1943), the saint is portrayed by B. Saraswathi.

In the 1973 film of the same name, the saint's young and adult versions are played respectively by Lakshmi and K. B. Sundarambal.

== See also ==
Parayi Petta Panthirukulam, a Kerala folktale partly inspired by Karaikal Ammaiyar, with the figure of Karakkalamma, a pious noble lady
