= K. B. Nagabhushanam =

Indian film director and producer

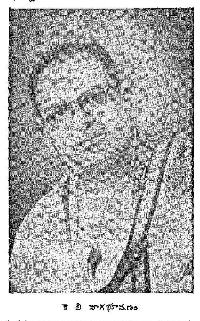
- Born: 1902; Tenneru, Hyderabad State, British India (now in Andhra Pradesh, India)
- Died: 18 October 1976 (aged 73–74); Madras (now Chennai), Tamil Nadu, India
- Occupations: South Indian Film producer, & director
- Spouse: P. Kannamba

Kadaru Nagabhushanam or K. B. Nagabhushanam (1902 – 18 October 1976) was a South Indian film producer and director of around 34 movies from the 1940s to 1960s, working in Telugu and Tamil cinema. He was the husband of the famous actress P. Kannamba, renowned for her roles in Telugu films Harischandra (1935), Draupadi Vastrapaharanam (1936) and Tamil film Kannagi (1942). They established Sri Rajarajeshwari Film Co. & Varalakshmi Pictures and produced many social and mythological films. In 1949 Kadaru Nagabhushanam was honored with an award by the Government of Madras for his social awakening film Navajeevanam on untouchability, which got the recognition of Madras State and was chosen as the best feature film.

== Film career ==
Kadaru Nagabhushanam entered the South Indian film industry as producer in 1939 with Telugu film Chandika under Bhavani Pictures banner with P. Kannamba and Late Bellary Raghavachary and followed by another Telugu film Thalli Prema in 1941. Along with Kannamba, he also partnered with H. M. Reddy, B.N. Reddi and Moola Narayanaswami and produced Grihalakshmi under Rohini Pictures banner. His directorial debut film was Sumati, which greatly attracted women. His magnum opus film Paduka Pattabhishekam (1945) starred C. S. R. Anjaneyulu, Addanki and Kannamba. He took special care of the clothing, ornaments and make-up, which is noticeable in every scene. Later, he produced Harischandra and Tulasi Jalandhara in Tamil language which were successful. He came back to Telugu with Saudamini (1951). His movie Peda Rytu (Poor farmer), a social message based film on Agricultural laborers became a landmark film in Telugu film industry. It was also remade as a Tamil film Ezhai Uzhavan. His movie Sati Sakkubai (1954) ran for 100 days in Andhra Pradesh theaters. His subsequent production was the popular Naga Panchami (1956) starring Anjali Devi and V. Nagayya. Also in 1956 He directed Sati Savitri in which S. V. Ranga Rao acted as Yamadharmaraja and shot into fame for his effective portrayal of the character. Kadaru Nagabhushanam was previlaged to receive the Chinese Premier Zhou Enlai to his Sati Savitri film set at Gemini Studios Chennai, India. Subsequently, he produced Sri Krishna Maya directed by C. S. Rao. His movie Dakshayagnam (1962) remembered as the film wherein N. T. Rama Rao portrayed as Lord Shiva for the first and last time. Kadaru Nagabhushanam Produced & Directed many films at Gemini Studios with renowned actors N. T. Rama Rao, Akkineni Nageswara Rao, M. G. Ramachandran and was one of the stalwarts of the south Indian film industry along with S. S. Vasan, B.N. Reddi and B. Nagi Reddi. In 1966 he produced his last telugu film Chaduvukunna Bharya and faced many problems in the production of a Tamil film Thalibhagyam starring M. G. Ramachandran and B. Saroja Devi. He incurred heavy losses due to the failure of both the films at the box office, which aggravated his financial conditions. After the death of his wife Kannamba in 1968, he declined mentally, physically and financially. He sold his properties, film rights and lived a sedate and quiet life, in contemplation, until his death in 1976 in Chennai, India. He was survived by his son, Kadaru Venkateswara Rao, two daughters and grandchildren.

== Filmography ==
Year	Film	Language	Credits
1939	Chandika	Telugu	Producer
1940	Grihalakshmi	Telugu	Producer - Partner
1941	Talliprema	Telugu	Producer
1942	Sumati	Telugu	Producer and director
1944	Harishchandra	Tamil	Producer and Director
1945	Paduka Pattabhishekam	Telugu	Producer and director
1946	Bhakta Tulasidas	Telugu	Producer
1947	Thulasi Jalandar	Tamil	Producer and director
1949	Navajeevanam	Tamil	Producer and director
1949	Navajeevanam	Telugu	Producer and director
1951	Saudamini	Tamil	Producer and director
1951	Soudamini	Telugu	Producer and director
1952	Ezhai Uzhavan	Tamil	Producer and director
1952	Peda Rytu	Telugu	Producer and director
1953	Lakshmi	Tamil	Producer and director
1953	Lakshmi	Telugu	Producer and director
1954	Sati Sakkubai	Telugu	Producer and director
1955	Shri Krishna Thulabaram	Telugu	Producer and director
1956	Naga Panjami	Tamil	Producer and director
1956	Naga Panchami	Telugu	Producer and director
1957	Sati Anasuya	Telugu	Director
1957	Sati Savitri	Tamil	Director
1957	Sati Savitri	Telugu	Director
1958	Anna Thammudu	Telugu	Producer
1958	Sri Krishna Maya	Telugu	Producer
1959	Veera Bhaskarudu	Telugu	Producer and director
1960	Dharmame Jayam	Telugu	Producer and director
1961	Usha Parinayam (1961 film)	Telugu	Producer and director
1962	Dakshayagnam	Tamil	Producer and director
1962	Dakshayagnam	Telugu	Producer and director
1963	Apta Mithrulu	Telugu	Producer and director
1965	Chaduvukunna Bharya	Telugu	Producer and director
1966	Thaali Bhagyam	Tamil	Director
1966	Usha Kalyanam	Telugu	Director
