= Ramakrishna (Telugu actor) =

Indian Telugu film actor

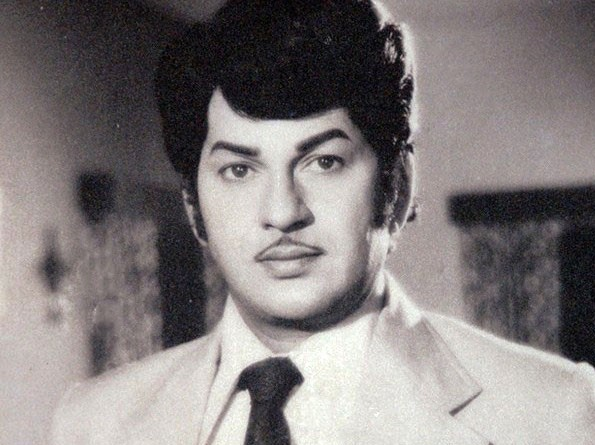
- Born: 15 October 1939; Bhimavaram, Andhra Pradesh, India
- Died: 22 October 2001 (aged 62); Chennai, Tamilnadu, India
- Years active: 1960-1995
- Known for: Indian Telugu Cinema
- Spouse: Geetanjali

Ramakrishna was an Indian actor who worked in Telugu cinema. He acted in over 200 films, including Telugu, Tamil, and Malayalam.

== Career ==
He was a stage actor from Bhimavaram in West Godavari district of Andhra Pradesh, and moved to Chennai in the 1950s. His movie debut was in 1960 with Nithya Kalyanam Pachathoranam. He acted as a hero in hit Telugu movies such as Nomu, Pooja, Nenu Naa Desam, Bomma Borusa, Badi Panthulu, Kurukshetram, Yuvataram Kadilindi, Mantralaya Sri Raghavendra Vaaibhavam, Hantakulostunnaru Jagrattha, Magadu, Katakatala Rudraiah, Doralu Dongalu, Kotalo Paga, and Viswanatha Nayakudu. He played various roles in several mythological films, including Yashoda Krishna, Vinayaka Vijayamu, Sri Krishnavatharam, Devude Digivasthe. He had also acted alongside thespians N. T. Ramarao and Akkineni Nageswara Rao. His contemporary heroes were Krishna, Haranath, and Sobhan Babu.

== Personal life ==
His first married in Bhimavaram, and has a daughter. He left his first wife and daughter and came to Madras. He married Telugu actress Geetanjali in 1974 and has a son, Srinivas. He died in 2001.

== Filmography ==
Year	Title	Role	Notes
1960	Nitya Kalyanam Pacha Thoranam		Debut movie
1960	Bhaktha Sabari	Lakshmana	
1960	Rama Sundari		
1960	Mangalyam		
1961	Kanna Koduku		
1961	Indrajeet (Sati Sulochana)	Lakshmana	
1961	Pelli Kaani Pillalu		
1962	Daksha Yagnam	Chandrudu	
1962	Swarna Manjari	Lord Jalakanteshwara Swamy	
1962	Chitti Tammudu		
1963	Sri Tirupatamma Katha	Lord Venkateswara	
1964	Bangaru Timmaraju		
1964	Desa Drohulu	CBI Officer	
1965	Thodu Needa		
1965	Aakasaramanna	Anangapala	
1965	Sri Simhachala Kshetra Mahima	Maha Vishnuvu	
1966	Mohini Bhasmasura	Shiva	
1966	Hantakulostunnaru Jagratta		
1967	Chadarangam		
1967	Satyame Jayam		
1967	Upayamlo Apayam		
1967	Sri Krishnavataram	Arjuna	
1967	Premalo Pramadam		
1967	Raktha Sindhooram		
1968	Rajayogam		
1968	Sukha Dukhalu		
1968	Asadhyudu		
1968	Ranabheri		
1968	Veeranjaneya	Arjuna	
1968	Jeevitha Bandham		
1968	Aggi Meeda Guggilam	Arindhava	
1968	Pedarasi Peddamma Katha		
1968	Bhale Kodallu	Ramam	
1968	Bangaru Sankellu		Guest role
1969	Sri Rama Katha	Parvatha Raju	
1969	Chiranjeevi		
1969	Kadaladu Vadaladu		
1969	Aggi Veerudu		
1969	Karpura Harathi	Dr. Raghu	
1970	Janmabhoomi		
1970	Pachani Samsaram		
1970	Suguna Sundari Katha	Jayanta Bhoopala	
1970	Marina Manishi		
1970	Evarini Nammali		
1971	Sri Krishna Vijayamu	Satyaki	
1971	Manasu Maangalyam		
1971	Vikramarka Vijayam	Vikramarkudu	
1971	Andariki Monagadu		
1971	Kattiki kankanam		
1971	Rowdilaku Rowdilu	Madhu	
1971	Maa Ilavelpu		
1971	Adrushta Jathakudu		
1971	Bangaru Kutumbam		
1971	Bomma Borusa	Sundaram	
1972	Korada Rani	C.I.D. Sekhar	
1972	Raitu Kutumbam		
1972	Pilla Piduga	Amar	
1972	Datta Putrudu		
1972	Adrushta Devatha		
1972	Kalavari Kutumbam	Balu	
1972	Badi Panthulu	Satyam	
1973	Panjaramlo Pasipapa	Dharma Rao, Sridhar	Dual role
1973	Aajanma Brahmachari		
1973	Mallamma Katha		
1973	Devudamma		
1973	Nenu Naa Desam		Dual role
1973	Varasuralu		
1973	Pasi Hrudayalu		
1974	Kannavari kalalu	Air Commodore Raju	
1974	Nomu	Nageshwar (Eshwar)	
1974	Nijarupalu		
1974	Premalu Pellillu	Dr. Raghu	
1974	Khaidi Babai		
1975	Sri Ramanjaneya Yuddham	Lakshmanudu	
1975	Yashoda Krishna	Krishna	
1975	Rajyamlo Rabandulu		
1975	Adadani Adrushtam		
1975	Maya Maschindra	Lord Siva	
1975	Ammayila Sapadham		
1975	Pooja	Ramachandrarao	
1975	Devude Digivaste		
1975	Pichodi Pelli		
1975	Bullemma Sapatham		
1975	Bala Nagamma		
1975	Naga Balayogi		
1976	Kotalo Paga	Narasimha Nayaka	Also producer
1976	Aasthi Kosam		
1976	Ee Kalapu Pillalu		
1976	Vanaja Girija		
1976	Naa Pere Bhagavan		
1976	Doralu Dongalu		
1976	Magadu		
1976	Alludochadu	Ravi/Sekhar	
1976	Poruginti pullakura		
1976	Seelaniki Siksha		
1976	Manchiki Maro Peru	Ravi	
1976	Mangalyaniki Maro Mudi		
1976	Nijam Nidrapodu		
1977	Kurukshetram	Balaramudu	
1977	Chakradhari	Lord Panduranga/ Ranganna	
1977	Judge Gari Kodalu		
1977	Swarganiki Nichenalu		
1977	Jeevithamlo Vasantham	Madhu	
1977	Manchi Roju		
1977	Seeta Rama leela		
1977	Sri Krishna Jarasandha		
1978	Prayanamlo Padanisalu		
1978	Sri Rama Pattabhishekam	Lakshmana	
1978	Katakataala Rudrayya		
1978	Punniya Boomi	Ramu	Tamil film
1979	Allari Pillalu		
1979	Oka Challani Rathri	Nityanand	
1979	Swami Drohulu		
1979	Sri Vinayaka Vijayamu	Lord Maha Vishnuvu	
1980	Asadhyulaku Asadhyudu	CID Suresh	
1980	Venkateswara Vratha Mahatyam	Lord Venkateswara	
1980	Yuvatharam Kadilindi		
1980	Lakshmi Nilayam		
1980	Maa Inti Devatha		
1981	Ramapuram Lo Seetha		Also producer
1982	Mantralaya Sri Raghavendra Vaibhavam	Raghavendra Swamy	
1983	Bahudoorapu Batasari		
1983	Tarzan Sundari	Raghuram	
1984	Aadadani Saval	Navy officer Ramu	
1984	James Bond 999	SP Ravindranath	
1984	Adarsavanthudu	Chiranjeevi	
1984	Sangeetha Samrat	Sudhakar	
1984	Ugra Roopam		
1986	Brahmastram	Inspector Jagannath	
1986	Ugra Narasimham		
1986	Dharmapeetam Daddarillindhi	Gopalakrishna	
1986	Tandra Paparayudu	Rangarayudu	
1987	Viswanatha Nayakudu	Lakshminarayana Pandit, Natyacharyudu	
1987	Marana Homam		
1987	Maa Voori Magadu	Raghuram	
1987	Akshintalu		
1988	Rocky		
1989	Lankeswarudu		
1989	Adavilo Ardharathri		
1992	Samrat Ashoka	Jayamallu	
1992	Enkanna Babu	Lord Venkateswara	
1995	Maya Bazaar	Dharmaraju	
