= Indrajeet (Sati Sulochana) =

- Theatrical release poster
- Directed by: S. Rajinikanth
- Written by: Samudrala Sr (dialogues)
- Screenplay by: D. V. Narasa Raju
- Based on: Life of Indrajit
- Produced by: S. Rajinikanth; D. V. Surya Rao; Kancharla Madhava Rao
- Starring: N. T. Rama Rao; Anjali Devi
- Cinematography: C. Nageswara Rao
- Edited by: N. S. Prakasam
- Music by: T. V. Raju
- Production company: Srikanth Productions
- Release date: 5 May 1961
- Running time: 143 mins
- Country: India
- Language: Telugu

Indrajeet (Sati Sulochana) is a 1961 Telugu-language Hindu mythological film, based on the life of Indrajit from the epic Ramayana, produced by S. Rajinikanth, D. V. Subba Rao and Kancharla Madhava Rao under the Srikanth Productions banner and directed by S. Rajinikanth. It stars N. T. Rama Rao, and Anjali Devi with music composed by T. V. Raju. Sati Sulochana and Pendli Pilupu were released on the same day, both starring Rama Rao. The film was dubbed into Bengali in 1979 as Meghnad Badh/Vadh.

== Cast ==
- N. T. Rama Rao as Indrajit / Meghanadhudu
- Anjali Devi as Sulochana
- S. V. Ranga Rao as Ravana
- Kanta Rao as Lord Vishnu / Lord Rama
- V. Nagayya as Valmiki
- Rajanala as Yama Dharma Raju
- Ramakrishna as Lakshmana
- Ramana Reddy as Gajasura
- Chalam as Narada Maharshi
- Mikkilineni as Indra
- Rajasree as Goddess Lakshmi / Goddess Sita
- Sandhya as Mandodari
- Mohana
- Kamala Kumari

== Soundtrack ==
Indrajeet (Sati Sulochana)

Film score by T. V. Raju
- Released: 1961
- Genre: Soundtrack
- Length: 45:31
- Producer: T. V. Raju

Music composed by T. V. Raju. Lyrics were written by Samudrala Sr.

S. No.	Song title	Singers	length
1	"Namo Namo Narayana"	P. B. Srinivas	2:56
2	"Aadave Vayyari"	P. B. Srinivas, K. Rani	4:06
3	"Kanara Raja"	S. Janaki	4:06
4	"Palukave Teeyaga"	P. Susheela	4:10
5	"O Priyatama"	Ghantasala, P. Susheela	3:53
6	"Prabhu Yeela Ee Parishodhana"	A. P. Komala	4:05
7	"Ramayanam"	Ghantasala	7:23
8	"Hey Deenabandhu"	P. Susheela	3:30
9	"Jaya Jaya Meghanatha"	S. Janaki, Jamuna Rani	3:44
10	"Prabhu Hay Prabhu"	P. Susheela	2:47
11	"O Hrudayeesa"	P. Susheela	4:51

== Remakes ==
It was made into Hindi movie in 1969, Directed by S.N. Tripathi starring Anita Guha, Prithviraj Kapoor. It was made into a movie titled Sati Naag Kanya in both 1956 and remade again in 1983, both being directed by Babubhai Mistry.
