= Harischandra (1935 film) =

1935 film by T. A. Raman

- Directed by: T. A. Raman
- Written by: Balijepalli Lakshmikantham (Story & dialogues)
- Produced by: S. A. Sami Pillay
- Starring: Addanki Srirama Murthy; Kannamba; Bhima Rao; Pulipati Venkateswarlu; Elesvarapu Kutumba Sastri
- Cinematography: Jinaraja Bodhye
- Production company: Star Combines
- Release date: 1935
- Country: India
- Language: Telugu

Harischandra is a 1935 Indian Telugu-language mythological film directed by T. A. Raman and produced by Star Combines. Featuring Addanki Srirama Murthy, Kannamba, and Master Bhima Rao in the lead roles, the film marks the Telugu cinema debut of Kannamba and Murthy. The film was successful and received acclaim for its storytelling.

== Cast ==
- Addanki Srirama Murthy as Harishchandra
- Kannamba as Chandramati
- Master Bhima Rao
- Pulipati Venkateswarlu as Nakshatraka
- Elesvarapu Kutumba Sastri as Kaushika
- Bandar Naidu
- Akula Narasimha Rao

== Crew ==
- Art Direction: Ganapatrao Wadangekar
- Assistant Director: P. Pullayya

== Production ==
The promotional material for the film highlights its extensive production, stating it required a budget of ₹1 lakh and took six months to complete. The release date is variably reported as either 16 October or 9 November 1935.

== Music ==
A notable song from the film, "Dandalandi Babu," is performed in a scene where Harischandra is sold into servitude. The film includes multiple verses recited by the main characters, contributing to the devotional and narrative depth of the storyline.

1. "Akata Akaliki Neno Mata"

2. "Aparadhumu Saiyave Aryamani" - sung by Addanki Srirama Murthy

3. "Ataku Bodhama Sakhulara Watamu Ga Jeri"

4. "Kanugonajalan Priyasuthuni Kanne" - sung by Pasupuleti Kannamba

5. "Karunakara Karunimpava Kanchanamba" - sung by Pasupuleti Kannamba

6. "Karunaguna Adhara Santata Srita Dina Lavanya"

7. "Jaya Jaya Kosala Desa Prabhu" - ensemble

8. "Dandalandi Babu Dandalandi"

9. "Na Priya Manoramana Nanu Nepudi Itivale" - sung by Pasupuleti Kannamba

10. "Mata Naduvalena Ha Padamula Entho Pokeno"

11. "Vagala Mari O Vayyari Mama Chindule Tayu"

12. "Srutajana Bandhu Karunasindhu"

13. "Ha Tanaya Nanu Basitiva Yi Vidhi Neevastamimpa" - sung by Pasupuleti Kannamba

14. "Salalita Karunanilaya Saraniyam Gade"

== Reception ==
Harishchandra was well received by audiences and achieved commercial success, cementing its place in early Telugu cinema history.
