= Pendli Pilupu =

- Theatrical release poster
- Directed by: A. V. Seshagiri Rao
- Written by: Acharya Aatreya-Aarudhra (dialogues)
- Produced by: Dinavahi Bhaskara Narayana
- Starring: N. T. Rama Rao; Devika
- Cinematography: Bul Bul
- Edited by: N. S. Prakasam
- Music by: K. Prasada Rao
- Production company: DBN Productions
- Release date: 5 May 1961
- Country: India
- Language: Telugu

Pendli Pilupu (transl. Wedding Invitation) is a 1961 Indian Telugu-language drama film, produced by Dinavahi Bhaskaranarayana and directed by A. V. Seshagiri Rao. It stars N. T. Rama Rao, and Devika with music composed by K. Prasada Rao. Pendli Pilupu and Indrajeet released on the same day, both starring Rama Rao.

== Cast ==
- N. T. Rama Rao as Madhu
- Devika as Radha / Anuradha
- Relangi as Bhagavanlu
- C.S.R. as Lawyer Ranganadham
- Peketi Sivaram as Nityanandam
- K. V. S. Sarma as Siva Rao
- Kannamba as Anasuyamma
- Suryakantham as Simhachalam
- Girija as Bala
- Hemalatha as Siva Rao's wife
- Nirmalamma

== Soundtrack ==
Music composed by K. Prasada Rao.

S. No.	Song title	Lyrics	Singers	length
1	"Padave Radhika"	Sri Sri	Ghantasala, P. Susheela	4:40
2	"Chakkani Vaade"	Sri Sri	Jikki	
3	"Telusuko O Javaraala"	Sri Sri	P. B. Srinivas	3:09
4	"Yemani Pilavaali"	Sri Sri	Ghantasala, P. Susheela	3:55
5	"Niganigalaade Chirunavvu"	Aarudhra	Madhavapeddi Satyam, S. Janaki	3:09
6	"Punnami Vennela"	Aarudhra	P. Susheela	
7	"Idereeyi Kaadoyi"	Sri Sri	Jikki, S. Janaki	
8	"Naaloni Anuraagamanta"	Aarudhra	Ghantasala	3:25
9	"Marenu Premasudha"	Aarudhra	P. Susheela	
