= Karaikkal Ammaiyar (1973 film) =

- Directed by: A. P. Nagarajan
- Written by: A. P. Nagarajan
- Produced by: Indra Rajan
- Starring: Lakshmi; K. B. Sundarambal; R. Muthuraman; Sivakumar; Srividya
- Cinematography: W. R. Subba Rao
- Edited by: T. Vijayarangam
- Music by: Kunnakudi Vaidyanathan
- Production company: Eveeyaar Films
- Release date: 1973
- Running time: 150 minutes
- Country: India
- Language: Tamil

Karaikkal Ammaiyar (transl. Mother Karaikal) is a 1973 Indian Tamil-language devotional film, written and directed by A. P. Nagarajan and produced by Eveeyaar Films. The film stars Lakshmi, who played the younger-age Punithavathi role, and K. B. Sundarambal, who played the old-age role—as the title characters, with R. Muthuraman, Manorama, Suruli Rajan, V. S. Raghavan, S. V. Sahasranamam, Sivakumar and Srividya playing supporting roles. Karaikkal Ammaiyar is one of the three women saints among the 63 Nayanmars and is considered one of the greatest figures of Tamil literature.

== Plot ==
Punithavathi (Lakshmi), right from childhood, had great faith in Lord Shiva and worshipped him daily. As a young girl, she built a Sivalingam in sand, stunning people. Her father Dhanathatthan (V. S. Raghavan) was a Merchant. As a young girl, She chanted Namshivaya Mantra of Lord Shiva several times daily, and took care of devotees of Shiva coming to her village. Later, she was married to Paramathathan (R. Muthuraman) son of a wealthy merchant from Nagapattinam. A devotee of Lord Shiva continued to visit her home, whom she lavishly fed and gave clothes to. Once, her husband sent her two mangoes to be kept for him. That day, a hungry Siva devotee came to her residence. Punithavathi gave the guest Curd rice and one of the mangoes. Later, when the husband came home she served a mango, he asked for the second. She was at a loss and prayed to Lord Shiva (Sivakumar). Suddenly, a mango appeared in her hands. She served the mango to her husband, who found it divinely delicious compared to the previous one and asked her how she got the second fruit. Since he was not religious, she was scared of revealing the truth. He began suspecting her and asked her to get another fruit. She gave him a mango that she got by prayer, the fruit disappeared when he touched it. He realised that his wife was no ordinary woman.

But she was a divine person and he began to call her "Ammaiyar". As he could no longer treat her as his wife, he left her and moved to Madurai, where he married another woman named Bhakyavathi (Kumari Padmini), through whom he had child. They named her also Punithavathi (Baby Sumathi). Ammaiyar prayed to Lord Shiva asking for a boon—that she may worship Shiva as a disembodied wraith. Her wish was granted, leaving all her beauty and bodily being. She then took on different form (K. B. Sundarambal). She became a fiery form of Mount Kailash, climbing it upside down on her head. There, the Goddess Parvati (Srividya) asked about Ammaiyar. Shiva said that Ammaiyar is the mother, who takes care of us. Ammaiyar worshiped Shiva. Shiva greeted her, calling her "Ammaiyae" (my mother) and Ammaiyar replied "Appa" (father to all). Shiva asked for her wish, to which Ammaiyar replied "I want endless and delightful love with you, I don't want to be born, Even if I have any birth, I should not forgot you". Shiva asked her to visit him in Thiruvalangadu, which she again did, travelling on her hands and sang and performed a holy dance (Rudhra Thandavam). Ammaiyar visited Thiruvalangadu. Ammaiyar sang "Thiruvaalangattu mootha Thirupathigam".

== Cast ==
- Lakshmi as younger age Punithavathi
- K. B. Sundarambal as old age Punithavathi
- R. Muthuraman as Paramathathan
- Sivakumar as Lord Shiva
- Srividya as Goddess Parvathi
- V. S. Raghavan as Dhanathathar (Punithavathi's father)
- S. V. Sahasranamam as Nithipathi (Paramathathan's father)
- Manorama as Pallavi (Punithavathi's friend)
- Suruli Rajan as Pallavan (Paramathathan's friend)
- Gandhimathi as Anupallavi (Pallavai's second mother)
- Kumari Rukmini as Dharmavathi (Punithavathi's mother)
- Seethalakshmi as Neelambikai (Paramathathan's mother)
- Thilakam as Sathyavathi
- Kumari Padmini as Bhakyalakshmi (Paramathathan's second wife)
- Ennathe Kannaiah as Pallavi's father
- Karuppu Subbiah as Villager
- T. K. S. Natarajan as Singer's assistant
- S. Rama Rao as Katha kalakshepam singer
- Baby Sumathi as Punithavathi (Paramathathan's daughter)
- S. Varalakshmi as woman saint
- K. D. Santhanam as wealthy leprosy patient

== Production ==
A scene depicting the wedding of Muthuraman and Padmini's characters was shot at AVM Studios in February 1973.

== Soundtrack ==
The music was composed by Kunnakudi Vaidyanathan.

Song	Singer	length
"Ulagamengum"	P. Susheela	4:10
"Nayagan Vadivai"	P. Susheela	3:05
"Anbe Sivam Endru"	S. Varalakshmi	4:01
"Iraiva Un Pugazh"	K. B. Sundarambal	2:51
"Vaduvatha Or Pozhuthum"	K. B. Sundarambal	1:00
"Padukiren Unnai"	K. B. Sundarambal	3:33
"Piravatha Varam Vedum"	K. B. Sundarambal	2:45
"Thaka Thaka Thakavena Aadava"	K. B. Sundarambal	6:53

== Reception ==
Navamani praised the acting, humour, music and direction.
