= Joseph Thaliath Jr. =

Indian film director and producer

Joseph Thaliath Jr. was an Indian film director and producer.

== Early life ==
Hailing from a Christian family, he was the son of a High Court Judge in Thiruvananthapuram when it was known as Trivandrum in the princely state of Travancore before independence. After completing his degree, he developed a flair for cinema and, much against his father's wishes, went to Madras (now Chennai) and worked as an assistant to a multi lingual film director called S. Soundararajan (S. Soundararaja Aiyengar, owner of the Tamil Nadu Talkies Laboratory.).

== Career ==
F. Nagoor was an art director, film producer and a partner of Newtone studios in Chennai. Joseph Thaliath Jr. joined him as a partner. With the help of F. Nagoor, he launched a new film company named Citadel Film Corporation. He wrote a story based on a Christian folklore and together with F. Nagoor, produced and directed the film Gnana Soundari. The film was released in 1948 and was a great success.

Following the success of Gnana Soundari, he established his own studio and named it as "Citadel Studios", inspired by the A. J. Cronin novel The Citadel. It was built on a spacious plot in Kilpauk, Chennai with two entrances. One entrance faced Poonamallee High Road and the other, Landon's Road.

In 1950, he wrote, produced and directed Ithaya Geetham, all on his own. The film was shot mostly in his Citadel Studios. He later dubbed the film into Hindi with the title Jeeva Taara.

Film stars C. L. Anandan of Vijayapuri Veeran fame and Jaishankar were introduced to the screen by Joseph Thaliath Jr.

== Filmography ==
- Gnana Soundari (1948)
- Ithaya Geetham (1950)
- Jeevan Tara (1951)
- Aathmasanthi (1952)
- Mallika (1957)
- Payal (1957)
- Vijayapuri Veeran (1960)
- Teen Dost (1964)
- Iravum Pagalum (1965)
- Vilakketriyaval (1965)
- Kathal Paduthum Padu (1966)
