= P. Kannamba =

Indian actress (1912–1964)

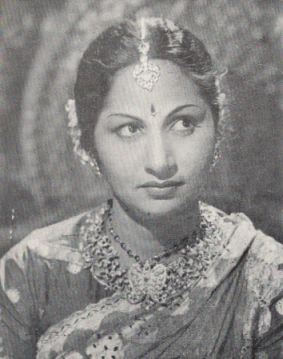
- Kannamba in 1949
- Born: Pasupuleti Kannamba; 5 October 1911; Madras Presidency, British India (present-day Andhra Pradesh)
- Died: 7 May 1964 (aged 52); Madras, Madras State, India
- Occupations: Actress, singer, film producer
- Spouse: Kadaru Nagabhushanam

Pasupuleti Kannamba (Pasupulēţi Kannāṃba) (5 October 1911 – 7 May 1964) was an Indian actress, playback singer and film producer of Telugu cinema, of Andhra Pradesh, India. She acted in more than 170 films and produced about 25 films in Telugu and Tamil languages from the 1930s to the 1960s.

== Career ==
Kannamba was born on 5 October 1911. Her birthplace is Owku in Nandyal district. Her parents were Lokamba and M. Venkanarasaiah, a government contractor. She was their only child and grew up with her maternal grandparents in Eluru. She started acting in dramas at the age of 13. She performed many characters such as Sati Savitri, Anasuya and Chandramati.

Her film career began with the Chandramati character in Harishchandra (1935) of Star Combines. She acted in about 150 films and won accolades for her roles in Draupadi Vastrapaharanam, Kanakataara, Saranagadhara, Gruhalakshmi and Chandika. She acted in the title role of Kannagi in Tamil and in Palnati Yudham as Nayakuralu Nagamma, opposite Govindarajula Subba Rao. She acted in Ashok Kumar (1941) as Queen, opposite another great actor, V. Nagayya. She acted together with P. U. Chinnappa in many movies, such as Kannagi, Mahamaya, Harischandra and Tulasi Jalandhar.

She married Kadaru Nagabhushanam in 1941. They established "Raja Rajeswari Films" and produced about 30 films, including Sumati, Padhuka Pattabhishekam, Saudamani, Peda Raitu, Lakshmi, Sri Krishna Tulabharam, Sati Sakkubhai and Sati Anasuya. Their movie Navajeevanam (1949) was awarded as the best film by Combined Madras state.

She died on 7 May 1964.

== Filmography ==
=== Actress ===
This is the complete list of her films compiled by H. Ramesh Babu.

Year	Film	Character	Language
1934	Seeta Kalyanam		Telugu
1935	Harishchandra	Chandramathi	Telugu
1936	Draupadi Vastrapaharanam	Draupadi	Telugu
1937	Kanakatara		Telugu
1937	Sarangadhara		Telugu
1938	Gruhalakshmi	Radha	Telugu
1939	Mahananda		Telugu
1940	Krishnan Thoothu	Draupadi	Tamil
1940	Bhoja Kalidasa		Telugu
1940	Chandika	Chandika	Telugu
1941	Ashok Kumar	Tishyaralshithai	Tamil
1941	Talliprema	Santha	Telugu
1942	Kannagi	Kannagi	Tamil
1942	Sumati		Telugu
1944	Mahamaya	Mahamaya	Tamil
1944	Harichandra	Chandramathi	Tamil
1945	Mayalokam		Telugu
1945	Maya Machhindra		Telugu
1945	Paduka Pattabhishekam	Kaikeyi	Telugu
1946	Mugguru Maratilu		Telugu
1947	Palnati Yudham	Naagamma	Telugu
1947	Tulasi Jalandhar		Tamil
1947	Deivaneethi		Tamil
1948	Gnana Soundari	Gnana Soundari	Tamil
1949	Navajeevanam		Tamil
1949	Mangaiyarkarasi		Tamil
1951	Saudamini		Tamil
1951	Saudamini		Telugu
1951	Sudharshan		Tamil
1952	Ezhai Uzhavan		Tamil
1952	Peda Rytu		Telugu
1952	Mugguru Kodukulu		Telugu
1952	Moondru Pillaigal		Tamil
1953	Lakshmi		Tamil
1953	Lakshmi		Telugu
1954	Manohara	Queen	Tamil
1954	Manohara	Queen	Telugu
1954	Sati Sakkubai		Telugu
1955	Anarkali	Jodha Bai	Telugu
1955	Anarkali	Jodha Bai	Tamil
1955	Chella Pillai		Tamil
1955	Pennarasi	Queen	Tamil
1955	Sri Krishna Tulabharam		Telugu
1955	Vadina		Telugu
1956	Charana Daasi		Telugu
1956	Naga Panchami		Tamil
1956	Naga Panchami		Telugu
1956	Umasundari		Telugu
1956	Mathar Kula Manickam		Tamil
1956	Thaikkupin Tharam	Meenatchi	Tamil
1957	Makkalai Petra Magarasi	Angamma	Tamil
1957	Todi Kodallu	Annapurna	Telugu
1957	Engal Veettu Mahalakshmi		Tamil
1957	Neelamalai Thirudan		Tamil
1957	Vanangamudi	Mangalam	Tamil
1958	Aadapettanam		Telugu
1958	Avan Amaran		Tamil
1958	Anna Thammudu		Telugu
1958	Kaathavaraayan	Kamakshi/Goddess Parvati	Tamil
1958	Kathavarayuni Katha		Telugu
1958	Kudumba Gauravam		Tamil
1958	Kutumba Gouravam		Telugu
1958	Shri Krishna Maya		Telugu
1958	Periya Koyil		Tamil
1958	Uthama Puthiran	Queen	Tamil
1958	Vanjikottai Valiban	Sivakami	Tamil
1958	Mangalya Balam		Telugu
1959	Manjal Magimai		Tamil
1959	Raja Makutam		Telugu
1959	Raja Magudam		Tamil
1959	Raja Sevai		Tamil
1959	Rechukka Pagatichukka		Telugu
1959	Veera Bhaskaradu		Telugu
1959	Nalla Theerpu		Tamil
1959	Uthami Petra Rathinam		Tamil
1959	Thaai Magalukku Kattiya Thaali	Thanabakkiam	Tamil
1959	Uzhavukkum Thozhilukkum Vandhanai Seivom		Tamil
1959	Vaazha Vaitha Deivam		Tamil
1960	Abhimanam	Mother	Telugu
1960	Dharmame Jayam		Telugu
1960	Jalsarayudu		Telugu
1960	Maa Babu		Telugu
1960	Padikkadha Medhai		Tamil
1961	Jagadeka Veeruni Katha	Parvathi Devi	Telugu
1961	Krishna Kuchela		Telugu
1961	Bhagyalakshmi		Tamil
1961	Marutha Nattu Veeran		Tamil
1961	Pelli Thambulam		Telugu
1961	Thaai Sollai Thattadhe		Tamil
1961	Pendli Pilupu		Telugu
1961	Usha Parinayam	Wife of Banasura	Telugu
1962	Thayai Katha Thanayan		Tamil
1962	Aatma Bandhuvu		Telugu
1962	Nichaya Thaamboolam	Kamakshi	Tamil
1962	Dakshayagnam	Daksha's wife	Tamil
1962	Dakshayagnam	Daksha's wife	Telugu
1962	Swarnamanjari		Telugu
1962	Padithaal Mattum Podhuma	Mangalam	Tamil
1963	Aapta Mitrulu		Telugu
1963	Idhu Sathiyam		Tamil
1963	Lava Kusha	Kausalya	Tamil
1963	Lava Kusa	Kausalya	Telugu
1963	Paruvu Prathishta		Telugu
1963	Needhikkuppin Paasam	Saraswathi	Tamil
1963	Kulamagal Radhai	Radha's Mother	Tamil
1964	Aathma Balam		Telugu
1964	Ramadasu	Ramadasu's wife	Telugu
1965	Antastulu		Telugu
1965	Chaduvukunna Bharya		Telugu
1965	Keelu Bommalu		Telugu
1968	En Thambi	Kannan Mother (Photo Image Used)	Tamil

=== Playback singer ===
These are some of the Telugu songs voiced by her for the films.

Year	Film	Songs
1935	Harishchandra	"Jananamu Dhanyata Gaada", "Karunakara", "Sritajana Bandhu"
1937	Kanakatara	"Ee Vasantha Sobha"
1938	Gruhalakshmi	"Badha Sahaname", "Naa Premaye", "Sagamu Rathiri Ayyane", "Yashoda Nandana"
1940	Chandika	"Anandamaye Naho", "Eme O Koyila", "Nene Raninaithe"
1941	Talliprema	"Jo Jo Nandabala", "Prema Nidhanamu"
1942	Sumati	"Jayahe Thrishooladhari"
1945	Maya Machhindra	"Dhanyambayyenu Janmamu", "Haayiga Paadedanu", "Meluko", "O Malathi"
1946	Mugguru Maratilu	"Stree Bhagyame Bhagyamu", "Teerugada Asha Nedu"
1947	Palnati Yudham	"Evaravaya Deva", "Thana Pantamu Naathona", "Thera Teeyagarada"

=== Producer ===
She has produced about 25–30 films along with her husband Kadaru Nagabhushanam under the banners of Sri Rajarajeswari films, Rajasri pictures and Sri Varalakshmi films.

Year	Film	Language
1941	Talliprema	Telugu
1942	Sumati	Telugu
1944	Harishchandra	Tamil
1945	Paduka Pattabhishekam	Telugu
1946	Bhakta Tulasidas	Telugu
1949	Navajeevanam	Tamil
1949	Navajeevanam	Telugu
1949	Tulasi Jalandhar	Tamil
1951	Saudamini	Tamil
1951	Saudamini	Telugu
1952	Ezhai Uzhavan	Tamil
1952	Peda Rytu	Telugu
1953	Lakshmi	Tamil
1953	Lakshmi	Telugu
1954	Sati Sakkubai	Telugu
1955	Shri Krishna Thulabaram	Telugu
1956	Naga Panchami	Tamil
1956	Naga Panchami	Telugu
1958	Sri Krishna Maya	Telugu
1959	Veera Bhaskarudu	Telugu
1960	Dharmame Jayam	Telugu
1961	Usha Parinayam	Telugu
1962	Dakshayagnam	Tamil
1962	Dakshayagnam	Telugu
1963	Apta Mithrulu	Telugu
1965	Chaduvukunna Bharya	Telugu
