= Earliest colour films in South India =

History of Color films in south india

The South Indian film industry produced colour films since the 1940s. The earliest colour films in India were also produced in South India.

== Tamil cinema ==
=== First colour film ===
Seetha Kalyanam is known to be Tamil Cinema's first colour film. The film was released in year 1934.

=== Hand - colored films ===
Some Indian films were hand-coloured, beginning in the 1940s. Bhaktha Chetha, a 1940 Tamil language film directed and produced by Krishnaswami Subrahmanyam, contained sequences which were hand-coloured. This is known to be the earliest Tamil film to have scenes in colour. This process colourises film shot originally in black and white by colouring the negatives frame by frame.Mangamma Sabatham (1943) included hand-tinted scenes. Haridas, released in 1944, has a clear statement of its release in full new colour copy in its poster. Saalivaahanan, a 1945 film by B. N. Rao, had a hand-coloured sequenced of a romantic scene by Ranjan and T. R. Rajakumari. This film is currently known to be lost with no surviving prints. A. V. M. Productions's Naam Iruvar (1947) and Vedhala Ulagam (1948) had hand-coloured sequences. The last sequence of Vethala Ulagam was hand tinted and drew large crowds because such coloured sequences in Tamil cinema were a rarity then. Murugesan was an expert craftsman, who could paint every frame in the positive print.

=== Gevacolor ===
Gevacolor is a colour motion picture process. It was established in 1948, originally based in Belgium and an affiliate of Agfacolor. The process and company flourished in the 1950s as it was suitable for on location shooting. The companies merged in 1964 to form Agfa-Gevaert, and continued producing film stock until the 1980s. Gevacolor was among the cheapest colour film, which encouraged Tamil cinema to produce colour films. Gevacolor films produced in India were mostly processed in the Film Centre, Mumbai.

Gevacolor made its debut in Tamil cinema through the film Kalyaanam Pannippaar, a 1952 Indian bilingual Tamil-Telugu satirical comedy film directed by L. V. Prasad and produced by B. Nagi Reddy and Aluri Chakrapani under their company Vijaya Vauhini Studios. The film's credits state the presence of Gevacolor sequences. However, the simultaneously shot Telugu version, Pelli Chesi Choodu, did not have any sequences in colour.

In 1955, Kanavaney Kankanda Deivam, a Tamil language fantasy film directed by T. R. Raghunath, had dance sequences by Anjali Devi in Gevacolor, which was rare in that decade. It clearly states this in its credits. This film was inspired by a 1954 Hindi language film, Naagin, to have its dance sequence in colour. Devta, a Hindi film released in 1956, is a remake of Kanavaney Kankanda Deivam, which also had sequences in colour. Both the versions were great successes.

Alibabavum 40 Thirudargalum made history in Tamil cinema by being the first Tamil film to be entirely shot and released in Gevacolor. It was also the first full-length colour film released in South India. A production of Modern Theatres and released in 1956, the film starred M. G. Ramachandran and Bhanumathi Ramakrishna in lead roles. This film was a swashbuckler which is still remembered by the current generation. Marma Veeran, released in the same year, is believed to contain sequences in Gevacolor.

Films like Alibabavum 40 Thirudargalum and Kanavaney Kankanda Deivam influenced other Tamil film directors and producers to make their films in colour. Due to the high price of colour then, some films had songs and dance sequences in colour, with their film's censor certificate stating "partly coloured".

"Partly coloured" films such as Thangamalai Ragasiyam, Ambikapathy and Allavudinum Arputha Vilakkum were released in 1957. The carnatic cinema song "Ehalogame" rendered by P. Leela and T. M. Soundararajan from the film Thangamalai Ragasiyam starring Sivaji Ganesan and Jamuna was shot in Gevacolor. Three duet songs from the film Ambikapathy were shot in colour; the credits say its Gevacolor sequences were cinematographed by W. R. Subba Rao, who mostly cinematographed Gevacolor sequence in Tamil cinema. The song "Chaelaadum Neerodai Meethaey" from the film Alauvidinum Arputha Vilakkum was shot in colour.

Nadodi Mannan, a 1958 film directed by and starring M. G. Ramachandran, had its second half in Gevacolor. The entry of the colour sequence began with a dance song by B. Sarojadevi. Illarame Nallaram, released the same year, contained a dance sequence for the song "Maaraney Un Malarkanai" in colour. B. Sarojadevi and Kumari Kamala appeared in this sequence.

Thirumanam, released on 18 July 1958, has a dance sequence by B. Sarojadevi, Kumari Kamala and Gopi Krishna in colour. This film, starring Gemini Ganesan and Savitri, is known to be lost with no surviving copies. B. R. Panthulu's Engal Kudumbam Perisu (1958) had a sequence of school children's dance drama in colour. This film was simultaneously shot in Kannada as School Master.

Veerapandiya Kattabomman is a 1959 Indian Tamil-language biographical war film directed by B. R. Panthulu which was entirely shot in Gevacolor and released its prints in Technicolor. It had a very good colour preservation although it was shot in Gevacolor. This is because of its prints released in Technicolor. It was expensive at that time to shoot a film entirely in Technicolor. This method helped the film's colour not to fade compared to other Gevacolor film such as Alibabavum 40 Thirudargalum, whose colour has faded badly. Veerapandiya Kattabomman is the first Tamil film to release its prints in Technicolor.

Also in 1959, Athisaya Penn was entirely shot in Gevacolor with some portions in Technicolor. It is the first Tamil film to contain sequences originally shot in Technicolor.

Gevacolor continued to be used in Tamil cinema even after the entry of Eastmancolor to Tamil cinema through the films Deiva Balam and Raja Malayasimman. These films had song and climax sequences in colour. Anjali Pictures's Adutha Veettu Penn starring Anjali Devi, T. R. Ramachandran and K. A. Thangavelu had a colourful sequence for the songs "Enakkaaga Neeyae Raajaa" and "Mannavaa Vaa Vaa Magizhavaa" in colour, which were notable parts of the film. The censor certificate and credits state the presence of these colour sequences processed at the Film Centre, Mumbai.

B. R. Panthulu included some Gevacolor sequence in his film Kuzhandhaigal Kanda Kudiyarasu which was simultaneously shot in Kannada as Makkala Rajya and dubbed into Telugu as Pillalu Techina Challani Rajyam. This film was released on 29 July 1960.

Sri Valli, a full-length Gevacolor film, was released on 1 July 1961. This was the fourth full-length colour film produced in Tamil. However, it was not a box office success compared to its 1945 version Sri Valli. This film was dubbed into Telugu as Sree Valli Kalyanam and released in 1962.

Kappalottiya Thamizhan, another film by B. R. Panthulu, contained a Gevacolor sequence as the censor certificate and credits state. Today, that film had no sequences in Gevacolor despite the fact that the censor certificate clearly states "partly coloured".

Lava Kusa is a 1963 Indian bilingual Telugu-Tamil Hindu mythological film, directed by C. Pullaiah and his son C. S. Rao. Shot and released entirely in Gevacolor, it is believed to be Telugu cinema's first full-length Gevacolor film. It was also the last Gevacolor film in Tamil. Gevacolor was replaced by Eastmancolor, which produced long-lasting colour prints.

=== List of Tamil films in Gevacolor ===
Title	Color	Year	Notes
Kalyaanam Pannippaar	Partly in colour	1952	First Tamil and South Indian film with a colour sequence. Song sequence of "Engu Sendraayo" filmed in colour.
Kanavaney Kankanda Deivam	Partly in colour	1955	Second Tamil film to have colour sequence. Song sequence of "Jagajothiye" and ending dance sequence in colour.
Alibabavum 40 Thirudargalum	Colour	1956	First full length Tamil colour film
Marma Veeran	Partly in colour	1956	Some scenes shot in colour.
Kannin Manigal	Partly in colour	1956	Contains sequences in Gevacolor. Lost film.
Thangamalai Ragasiyam	Partly in colour	1957	Sequence of the song "Ehalogame" in colour
Ambikapathy	Partly in colour	1957	Sequence of duet songs in colour
Allaudinum Arputha Vilakkum	Partly in colour	1957	Song sequence of "Chelaadum Neerodai Meethae" in colour
Nadodi Mannan	Partly in colour	1958	Second half in colour
Illarame Nallaram	Partly in colour	1958	Dance sequence by Saroja Devi and Kumari Kamala in colour.
Engal Kudumbam Perisu	Partly in colour	1958	Children's dance drama in colour
Neelavukku Neranja Manasu	Partly in colour	1958	Dance sequence for the song "Kanakku Pannuraaru Summaa" by Helen in colour.
Thirumanam	Partly in colour	1958	Dance sequence by Gopi Krishna, Kumari Kamala and B. Sarojadevi in colour. This is a lost film with no surviving prints.
Minnal Veeran	Partly in colour	1959	Second half in color.
Deiva Balam	Partly in colour	1959	Second half of the film and other segments in colour.
Veerapandiya Kattabomman	Gevacolor	1959	Shot entirely in Gevacolor, then prints released in Technicolor.
Athisaya Penn	Partly in Gevacolor	1959	Film was shot in Gevacolor. The climax of this film was shot in Technicolor for 45 minutes.
Adutha Veetu Penn	Partly in colour	1960	The sequences for the songs "Enakkaga Nee Raja", Mannavaa Vaa Vaa, and the animation of credit scenes were in colour.
Kuzhandhaigal Kanda Kudiyarasu	Partly in colour	1960	Some parts of the film appeared in colour.
Sri Valli	Colour	1961	Although shot entirely in colour, the film was not a commercial success because of a draggy storyline.
Kappalottiya Thamizhan	Partly in colour	1961	A song sequence shot in colour.
Lava Kusa	Colour	1963	Last Tamil film to be shot in Gevacolor. Tamil colour films after 1963 were shot in Eastmancolour.

=== Technicolor ===
Technicolor is a series of colour motion picture processes, the first version dating from 1916, and followed by improved versions over several decades. Technicolor had never been widely used in Tamil cinema as it is the world's most expensive colour process. Only three Tamil films were associated with Technicolor.

Athisaya Penn, a 1959 remake of the Hindi film Aasha was entirely shot in Gevacolor with dance portions in Technicolor. This is the first Tamil film to contain sequences shot and released originally in Technicolor.

Veerapandiya Kattabomman, entirely shot in Gevacolor, had its prints released in Technicolor for a long-lasting colour image. This process kept the colour of the film well preserved. Only this film in South India used this process.

The only Indian Tamil film entirely shot and released in Technicolor was M. V. Raman's Konjum Salangai. It starred Gemini Ganesan, Savitri and Kumari Kamala and R. S. Manohar. It was released in India on 14 January 1962, coinciding with Thai Pongal. It was the first Tamil film to be exhibited in Poland with a dubbed version. In a review dated 28 January 1962, The Indian Express said, "Konjum Salangai, the first Technicolor feature film of South India is a revealing experience that even our technicians can bring out in a film the rich, glossy sheen and pleasing tonal gradations comparable with that of any Technicolor product made abroad."

Sri Lanka's first Tamil language film, Samuthaayam, released in 1962, was entirely shot in 16mm Technicolor.

=== Eastmancolor ===
Eastmancolor is a trade name used by Eastman Kodak for a number of related film and processing technologies associated with colour motion picture production. First introduced in 1950, it was one of the first widely successful "single-strip colour" processes, and eventually displaced the more cumbersome Technicolor.

Eastmancolor was known by a variety of names such as Deluxe colour (20th Century Fox), Warnercolor, Metrocolor, Pathecolor and Columbiacolor.

Eastmancolor made its debut in Tamil cinema in 1959 through the film Raja Malayasimman. The film was simultaneously shot in Telugu with the same titles and were "partly coloured".

Director K. Shankar announced that his film Parma Pidha (1961) would be shot entirely in Eastmancolor. Starring M. G. Ramachandran and B. Sarojadevi in the lead roles, shooting took place for two days but unfortunately, the film was not released because of M. G. Ramachandran's role as a Catholic priest. In the same year, T. R. Raghunath's Naaga Nandhini starring Anjali Devi and K. Balaji had dance sequence and fight scenes in Eastmancolor, as its credits say.

After three years, Eastmancolor made its comeback through the 1964 Indian Tamil-language romantic comedy film produced and directed by C. V. Sridhar, Kadhalikka Neramillai. This was Tamil cinema's first film entirely in Eastmancolor. It was a great success at the box office which influenced other directors and producers to film their movies in Eastmancolor. After the release of this film, Eastmancolor was vastly used in Tamil cinema, making the cinema colourful. In 1964, four films, Kadhalikka Neramillai, Karnan, Puthiya Paravai and Padagotti, were shot and released entirely in Eastmancolor. Films were rarely "partly coloured" during this period.

Director C. V. Sridhar used unique cinematography in his Eastmancolor films which were hits in Tamil cinema, including Kadhalikka Neramillai, Vennira Aadai and Ooty Varai Uravu.

Many devotional films directed by A. P. Nagarajan in the '60s were released in Eastmancolor, and their colours have never faded. These films include Thiruvilaiyadal, Saraswathi Sabatham, Kandhan Karunai, Thiruvarutchelvar and Thirumal Perumai. Thillana Mohanambal, starring Sivaji Ganesan and Padmini, was entirely shot in colour. Rajaraja Cholan (1973) was the first Cinemascope film in South India, which was coloured by Eastmancolor.

Films such as Veerabhimanyu (1965), Thunaivan (1969), Swathi Natchathiram (1974), Andharangam (1975) and Mazhai Maegham (1976) were among films "partly coloured" by Eastmancolor, while entirely Eastmancolor-shot films like Kannamma (1972) and Rajapart Rangadurai (1973) were partly in black and white.

=== Partial list of Tamil films in Eastmancolor ===
- Raja Malayasimman (1959) (partly coloured)
- Naaga Nandhini (1961) (partly coloured)
- Naagamalai Azhagi (1962) (partly coloured)
- Kadhalikka Neramillai (1964)
- Karnan (1964)
- Pudhiya Paravai (1964)
- Padagotti (1964)
- Thiruvilaiyadal (1965)
- Enga Veetu Pillai (1965)
- Idhayak Kamalam (1965)
- Vennira Aadai (1965)
- Aayirathil Oruvan (1965)
- Veerabhimanyu (1965) (partly coloured)
- Anbe Vaa (1966)
- Saraswathi Sabatham (1966)
- Parakkum Paavai (1966)
- Adhey Kangal (1967)
- Bhakta Prahlada (1967)
- Kandhan Karunai (1967)
- Naan (1967)
- Ooty Varai Uravu (1967)
- Pattanathil Bhootham (1967)
- Thiruvarutchelvar (1967)
- Kudiyiruntha Kovil (1968)
- Ragasiya Police 115 (1968)
- Thillana Mohanambal (1968)
- Thirumal Perumai (1968)
- Moondrezhuthu (1968)
- Adimaippen (1969)
- Nam Naadu (1969)
- Shanti Nilayam (1969)
- Sivandha Mann (1969)
- Thanga Surangam (1969)
- Thunaivan (1969) (partly coloured)
- En Annan (1970)
- Engal Thangam (1970)
- Engirundho Vandhaal (1970)
- Maattukkaara Velan (1970)
- Sorgam (1970)
- Thedi Vandha Mappillai (1970)
- Thirumalai Thenkumari (1970)
- Vilaiyattu Pillai (1970)

Eastmancolor was used in Tamil films until the late 70s. Other colour processes such as ORWO colour were a cause of the decline of Eastmancolor.

=== ORWO colour ===
ORWO (for ORiginal WOlfen) is a brand of photographic products and magnetic recording tape.

It was established in East Germany as a brand for photographic film and magnetic tape, mainly produced at the former ORWO Filmfabrik Wolfen (now CChemiepark Bitterfeld-Wolfen|Chemical Park Bitterfeld-Wolfen).

In 1909 the Filmfabrik Wolfen was founded as part of the Aktien-Gesellschaft für Anilin-Fabrikation (Agfa) and belonged to I.G. Farben since 1925. The Agfa Wolfen plant developed the first modern colour film, with incorporated colour couplers, Agfacolor, in 1936.

ORWO colour had caused Tamil cinema to have all films in colour. ORWO Colour was among the cheapest methods at that time (in the late 70s). Pattina Pravesam, a 1977 film directed K. Balachander, was Tamil cinema's first film to be shot in ORWO colour. Colour films after 1978 were mostly shot in ORWO Colour. It gave a similar colour quality as Eastmancolor. Tamil films in the 80s were all shot using ORWO Colour. Films like Mullum Malarum (1979) and Samsaram Adhu Minsaram (1986) were shot and released in ORWO colour.

=== End of black and white era ===
After 1975, the number of black and white films decreased. Avargal (1977) was among the black and white Tamil films that was successful. Tamil cinema rarely produced black and white films in the 1980s. Sandhya Ragam (1989) was Tamil cinema's last full length black and white Tamil film. Although in black and white, this film won the 37th National Film Awards and it the Award for Best Film on Family Welfare (1990). Iruvar (1997) had some sequences in black and white. Mugham (1999) had some black and white sequences and was a box office failure.

=== Milestones ===
- First Tamil colour film - Sita Kalyanam (1934)
- First Tamil film with hand-coloured sequence – Bhaktha Chetha (1940)
- First full length hand-coloured Tamil film – Haridas (1944)
- Last film with hand-coloured sequence – Vedhala Ulagam (1948)
- First film with Gevacolor sequence – Kalyaanam Pannippaar (1952)
- First full length Gevacolor Tamil film – Alibabavum 40 Thirudargalum (1956)
- First Tamil film with sequence originally shot in Technicolor – Athisaya Penn (1959)
- First full length Tamil film that released its prints in Technicolor – Veerapandiya Kattabomman (1959)
- Earliest Tamil films with Eastmancolor sequences – Raja Malayasimman and Deiva Balam (1959)
- Only South Indian film entirely shot and released its prints in Technicolor – Konjum Salangai (1962)
- Last Tamil film entirely shot in Gevacolor – Lava Kusa (1963)
- First Tamil film entirely shot in Eastmancolor – Kadhalikka Neramillai (1964)
- First South Indian colour film in Cinemascope – Rajaraja Cholan (1973)
- Last Tamil film to be "partly coloured" – Swathi Natchathiram (1974), Andharangam (1975), Piriya Vidai (1975) & Mazhai Maegham (1976)
- First Tamil film shot in ORWO colour – Pattina Pravaesam (1978)
- Last Tamil film in black and white – Sandhya Raagam (1989)

== Malayalam cinema ==
Kandam Becha Kottu was Malayalam cinema's first full-length colour film. It was shot in Eastmancolor and released in 1961. In the same year, Sabarimala Ayyappan was released. It is known to be the only Malayalam movie shot and released in Gevacolor. Chemmeen was shot entirely in Eastmancolor.

=== Eastmancolor ===
Chemmeen (1965), Karakanakadal (1971), Panitheeratha Veedu (1972), Nakhangal (1973), Chattakkari, and Nellu (1974) were shot in Eastmancolor. Malayalam cinema started to release many colour movies after 1975.

=== ORWO Colour ===
Kallichellamma, released in year 1969 is South India's first film shot and released in ORWO colour. Karakanakadal, released in year 1971 was shot in ORWO colour too. ORWO colour was popular in Malayalam cinema in the late 1970s and the 1980s.

=== Partly coloured films ===
Bharya (1962), Kadalamma (1963), Shakuntala (1965), Pearl View (1970), and Postmane Kananilla (1972) had some colour sequences. Pearl View's colour sequences were coloured by Eastmancolor.

== Telugu cinema ==
Telugu cinema produced films with colour portions since the late 1950s. Allauddin Adhbhuta Deepam, released in 1957, is the earliest Telugu film to have a colour sequence. Lava Kusa (1963) was Telugu cinema's first full-length colour film.

=== Gevacolor ===
Allauddin Adhbhuta Deepam (1957) was Telugu cinema's first film to have a colour sequence. The song "Andhaala Konetilona" (the last sequence of the film) was shot in Gevacolor. Appu Chesi Pappu Koodu (1959) had a dance sequence by E. V. Saroja in colour. In 1960, Runanubandham had its first 15 minutes in Gevacolor. Pillalu Techina Challani Rajyam (1960) too had some colour sequences. Aaraadhana, a 1962 film starring Akkineni Nageswara Rao and Savithri, had a song sequence, "Ohoho Mavayya", in Gevacolor. Lava Kusa (1963), Telugu cinema's first full-length colour film, was the last Telugu film to be shot in Gevacolor. Later, Telugu colour films were shot in Eastmancolor.

=== Eastmancolor ===
Raja Malaya Simha and Daiva Balam, both released in 1959, had sequences in Eastmancolor. Both simultaneously shot in Tamil, these films were the earliest to contain sequences of Eastmancolor in South India. Amara Silpi Jakkanna, released in 1964, is Telugu cinema's first full-length Eastmancolor film. Many partly coloured Telugu films by Eastmancolor were released in the late 60s.

Tene Manasulu (1965) was Telugu cinema's first social colour film. In the late 1960s and 1970s, films such as Ave Kallu, Bhakta Prahlada, Rahasyam, Kalyana Mandapam, Krishnaveni, Prem Nagar, Sampoorna Raamaayanam, Sri Krishna Satya, Manchi Rojulu Vachayi, Bangaru Babu, Andala Ramudu, and Bhakta Tukaram were shot in Eastmancolor.

There were no Telugu films shot in Technicolor. Technicolor films from Tamil cinema such as Veerapandiya Kattabomman (Telugu: Veerapandya Kattabrahmana) and Konjum Salangai (Telugu: Muripinche Muvvalu) were dubbed into Telugu. Films like Bharya Biddalu and Dasara Bullodu were shot entirely in Eastmancolor.

=== ORWO Colour ===
Sneham, a Telugu film released in year 1977 is known to be the first Telugu film to be shot and released in ORWO colour. ORWO colour was quite common in the 1980s Telugu Cinema, mainly used for low budget films.

=== Partly coloured films ===
Bandipotu (1963) was a partly coloured film by Eastmancolor. Telugu cinema did not produce many full length colour films in the late 1960s and early 1970s but produced films which were partly coloured like Leta Manasulu, Mooga Nomu, Dharma Daata, Veerabhimanyu, Gudachari 116, Amayakuralu, Raitu Kutumbam, Sri Krishna Vijayam, Sisindri Chittibabu, Pavitra Hrudayalu, Manasu Mangalyam, Amma Kosam, and Poola Rangadu. Bandipotu Dongalu had a colour sequence in a song video but was not described as partly coloured in the Central Board of Film Censors' certificate. The song "Yadanu Dhachina Mounaveena" was partly shot in black and white and Eastmancolor in the film Bandipotu Dongalu. Gorintaku (1979) was partly in black and white in its first 15 minutes.

== Kannada cinema ==
Stree Rathna (1955) had some colour sequences. Rathnagiri Rahasya (1957) had some song sequences in Gevacolor. A dance drama sequence from the film School Master was shot in Gevacolor. Amarashilpi Jakanachaari was the first full-length Kannada colour film to be released. It was shot in Eastmancolor. Kannada cinema produced many colour films in the '70s.

=== Gevacolor ===
Stree Rathna was the first Kannada film to be coloured in Gevacolor, in 1955. In 1957, Rathnagiri Rahasya had songs in Gevacolor. A dance drama sequence from the film School Master was shot in Gevacolor. Makkala Rajya, released in 1960, also had colour sequence. Kannada cinema never produced a full-length Gevacolor film.

=== Eastmancolor ===
Eastmancolor was introduced to Kannada cinema through Dashavathara (1960). Veera Kesari (1963) had its climax scene in Eastmancolor. The first full-length Kannada colour film, Amarashilpi Jakanachari, was shot in Eastmancolor in 1964. In the 1970s, films such as Bangarada Manushya, Eradu Kanasu, Sri Krishna Devaraaya, and Sampathige Savaal were shot in Eastmancolour.

=== ORWO colour ===
Kannada cinema had introduced ORWO colour process through the film Bhale Adrushtavo Adrushta, released in 1971.

== Other cinemas ==
- Konkani cinema's first colour film was Mog Ani Moipas, released in 1977.
- Tulu cinema's first colour film was Kariyani Kattandi Kandani, released in 1978.
