= List of Tamil films of 1940 =

The following is a list of films produced in the Tamil film industry in India in 1940, in alphabetical order.

== 1940 ==
Title	Director	Production	Music	Cast	Release date (D-M-Y)
2 Ana		Saraswathi Films	1. 2-Anna, 2. Bala Bakthan, 3. Doctor Bangaru (3 films bundled together)		
Abalai	P. S. V. Iyer	Sri Krishna Pictures	Sarma Brothers	Vasantha Kumar, Baby Pappa, V. R. Dhanam, Seethalakshmi	24-04-1940
Baktha Korakumbar	C. V. D. E. Iyer	Sri Gopal Krishna Pictures		K. T. Duraisamy, S. Sundararajan, T. S. Rajagopala Iyer	13-12-1940
Bhaktha Chetha	K. Subramanyam	K. Subramanyam, Madras United Artist Corporation	V. S. Parthasarathy Iyengar	Papanasam Sivan, G. Subbulakshmi, Kothamangalam Subbu, S. R. Janaki	14-01-1940
Baktha Thulasidass					
Bakya Dhara	Dwarakanath	Dwarakanath Productions	Brahmanandam	M. R. Subbaiah, C. V. Nagarathinam, G. M. Basheer, D. M. Ambujam, C. S. Narayanaswamy, Baby Jayalakshmi, M. P. Murugappa	10-02-1940
Bala Bakthan		Saraswathi Films	1. 2-Anna, 2. Bala Bakthan, 3. Doctor Bangaru (3 films bundled together)		
Balya Vivaham	Ramkumar	Rukmani Pictures		Ramkumar, Shantha, P. Sundar Rao, Baby Sakunthala, P. Duraisamy Iyer, Janaki, A. C. Ramanathan, Madhurambal	31-08-1940
Bhakti or Ambareeshan Sariththiram	D. G. Gune	V. T. Rajan, Vel Pictures		Subbaiah Naidu, Lakshmi Bai, R. Nagendra Rao, Kamala Bai, P. G. Venkatesan	02-03-1940
Bhooloka Rambai	B. N. Rao	M. Somasundaram & M. D. Viswanathan, Salem Shanmugha Films & Vijaya Maruthi Pictures	G. Ramanathan	K. L. V. Vasantha, T. K. Shanmugam, T. R. Mahalingam, T. S. Balaiah, N. S. Krishnan, T. A. Madhuram, Kumari Rukmini	14-12-1940
Chandraguptha Chanakya Vaishu Hammu Sathya Vinoth Tharuthalai Abishek	C. K. Sachi (C. K. Sathasivan)	Trinity Theatres	Papanasam Sivan	N. C. Vasanthakokilam, N. S. Krishnan, T. A. Madhuram, Bhavani K. Sambamurthy, Brihadambal, T. K. Kalyanam, S. S. Koko, P. Saradambal	24-08-1940
Desa Bakthi		Sri Prakash Productions	Shankar Rao Vyas; C. N. Pandurangan	Sripathi R. R., S. P. L. Dhanalakshmi, C. N. Pandurangan, T. S. Dhamayanthi, Basha, P. Brahadhambal	12-10-1940
Dhaanasoora Karna	Dwarakanath	Dwarakanath Productions	V. Srinivasa Iyengar, V. Bala Subbarayalu, P. G. Anandaraj, Srinivasa Rao, M. R. Parthasarathy & S. G. Krishnamurthi Pillai	T. S. Santhanam, Thiripurambal, B. R. Panthulu, K. R. Sarathambal, Chokkalinga Bhagavathar, K. Vijayagowri, P. A. Kumar, M. S. Sundari Bai	2-05-1940
Doctor Bangaru		Saraswathi Films	1. 2-Anna, 2. Bala Bakthan, 3. Doctor Bangaru (3 films bundled together)		
Duban Queen		Prakash Lakshmi Pictures		R. P. Lakshmi Devi, S. Basha, S. S. Koko, C. K. Rajagopal, Saraswathi Bai, Vijayakumar, N. S. Ranthambal	
Harihara Maya or Bhikshadanar	C. V. Raman	T. R. Sundaram, Modern Theatres	G. Ramanathan	C. S. Selvarathinam, D. S. Krishnaveni, C. V. V. Panthulu, T. S. Jaya, S. D. Subbaiah, P. R. Mangalam	24-08-1940
ICS Mappillai					
Jeyabarathi	Raja Yagnik	Mohan Pictures		B. S. Srinivasa Rao, M. A. Rajamani, Baby Rukmini, Kamala	22-03-1940
Jayakodi	Bhagwan Dada	South Indian United Artistes Corporation	Ram Sithalkar	K. T. Rukmini, K. Natarajan, Kulathu Mani, Babu, K. Kokila, K. T. Sakku Bai, S. Baasha	17-03-1940
Kalamegam	Ellis R. Dungan	Sri Dhandayuthapani Films & Salem Mohini Pictures	R. N. Chinnaiah	T. N. Rajarathinam Pillai, S. P. L. Dhanalakshmi, N. S. Krishnan, T. A. Madhuram, Kali N. Rathnam, M. S. Muthukrishnan, P. R. Mangalam, T. N. Rajalakshmi, P. S. Gnanam	17-05-1940
Krishnan Thoothu	R. Prakash	SM. Letchumanan Chettiar, Rajagopal Talkies	Papanasam Sivan & Papanasam Rajagopal Iyer	Serukulathur Sama, P. Kannamba, Visalur Subramania Bhagavathar, Nagainallur Lakshminarayana Bhagavathar, D. Balasubramaniam, Sandow Natesa Pillai, S. S. Mani Bhagavathar, Battling C. S. D. Singh, M. A. Ganapathi Bhat, N. S. Krishnan, T. A. Mathuram, T. S. Krishnaveni, M. N. Vijayal, Baby Ranga, Baby Sulochana and dance by V. N. Janaki	
Manimegalai or Balasanyaasi	Bomman Irani	T. K. Productions	Papanasam Sivan & Papanasam Rajagoplan	K. B. Sundarambal, Kothamangalam Seenu, N. S. Krishnan, T. A. Madhuram, P. S. Veerappa, Pulimoottai Ramaswami	30-10-1940
Meenakshi Kalyanam	R. Padmanaban	East India Film Company		(Male) Maharajapuram Krishnamoorthy, K. S. Sethupathi Pillai, Kali N. Rathnam, K. Sivaraman, D. Srinivasa Rao, K. K. Radha - (Female) Baby Meenal, T. Premavathi, C. Padmavathi, P. R. Mangalam, K. S. Angamuthu, M. S. Janaki, M. D. Rajam	14-09-1940
Mummanigal		Saraswathi Films		1. 2-Anna, 2. Bala Bakthan, 3. Doctor Bangaru (3 films bundled together)	
Naveena Thenali Raman				N. S. Krishnan, T. A. Madhuram	
Naveena Vikramadityan and Buddhimaan Balavaan Avaan	K. S. Mani	N. S. Krishnan, Ashoka Films		N. S. Krishnan, T. A. Madhuram, S. V. Sahasranamam, T. S. Durairaj, M. R. Swaminathan, P. S. Gnanam, T. S. Krishnaveni, P. R. Mangalam	29-06-1940
Neelamalaikkaithi	Homi	Deccan Films	Shanthikumar	S. R. Sandow, Susheela, V. S. Mani, S. R. Rajamani, Vasanthakumardas	29-06-1940
Kiratha Arjuna or Oorvasi Saahasam	G. Ramaseshan & Murugadasa (Muthuswami Iyer)	Venus Pictures (old)	Bhavani K. Sambamurthi	M. R. Krishnamurthi, P. B. Rangachari, Thirukharaivaasal Subbulakshmi, Bhavani, K. Sambamurthi, T. M. Ramasami Pillai, M. V. Sulochana, M. S. Mani, T. V. Lakshmi	25-05-1940
Parasuramar	H. S. Mehtha	Angel Films	G. Ramanathan	Serukalathur Sama, K. L. V. Vasantha, N. S. Krishnan, T. A. Madhuram, U. R. Jeevarathinam, T. R. Mahalingam, M. R. Krishnamoorthi and dance by S. Varalakshmi	13-04-1940
Poli Panchali	A. T. Krishnasami	A. V. Meiyappan, Pragathi Pictures			
Raja Yogam	B. Sampathkumar	T. R. Sundaram, Modern Theatres		U. R. Jeevarathinam, K. Nadarajan, T. K. Sampangki, K. Kogila, M. A. Venu, V. M. Ezhumalai	
Sakuntalai	Ellis R. Dungan	Royal Talkies, Newtone Studios	Thuraiyur Rajagopala Sharma	M. S. Subbulakshmi, G. N. Balasubramaniam, Serukulathur Sama, N. S. Krishnan, T. A. Madhuram, Saradhambal, T. S. Durairaj, T. P. S. Mani, Ramani, Kalyanam, K. Thavamani Devi, Golden Saradhambal	
Sathi Mahanantha	Baburao Savan	T. R. Sundaram, Modern Theatres		U. R. Jeevarathinam, C. V. V. Panthulu, P. B. Rangachari, S. D. Subbaiah, N. Bageerithi	21-09-1940
Sathi Murali	T. C. Vadivelu Naicker	T. R. Sundaram, Modern Theatres		M. K. Radha, M. R. Santhanalakshmi, T. R. Mahalingam, T. A. Madhuram, Baby S. Varalakshmi, Kali N. Rathnam, P. S. Gnanam, Nagercoil K. Mahadevan, L. Narayana Rao, P. G. Venkatesan, Buffoon Sankara Iyer, Joker Ramudu,	
Satyavaani	S. Nottani	T. R. Sundaram, Modern Theatres		M. R. Radha, K. L. V. Vasantha, U. R. Jeevarathinam, C. T. Rajakantham	
Shailak		Serukulathur Sama		T. S. Sandhanam	
Shyam Sundar; Alternate name: Radhaiyin Kadhal	A. P. Kapoor	Lakshmi Cinetone	H. R. Padmanaba Sastri	Master Raju, C. L. Krishnan, S. Nath, R. Seshan, K. Thavamani Devi, Kalyani Ammal, Rukmini Devi	18.05.1940 (Censored date)
Indhiya Thai or Maathru Dharmam		Cinema Rani T. P. Rajalakshmi, Sri Rajam Talkies own production			
Tharuthalai Thangavelu				N. S. Krishnan, T. A. Madhuram	
Thillothama		Coronation Films		Sandow M. M. A. Subbaiah Thevar, Sandow M. M. A. Chinnappa Thevar	
Thirumangai Aazhwar	S. Soundararajan	Tamil Nadu Talkies; Vel Pictures	S. N. Ranganath Rao	Kothamangalam Seenu, K. T. Rukmini, M. Lakshmanan, V. Pankajam, Kulathu Mani, K. T. V. Sakku Bai	28-09-1940
Uthama Puthiran	T. R. Sundaram	T. R. Sundaram, Modern Theatres		P. U. Chinnappa, M. V. Rajamma, N. S. Krishnan, T. A. Madhuram, T. S. Krishnaveni, Kali N. Rathnam, T. S. Balaiah, U. R. Jeevarathinam	
Vaayaadi	Nandalal Jaswantlal	A. V. Meiyappan, Pragathi Pictures		T. R. Ramachandran, Kali N. Rathnam, Madhuri Devi, Lux Beauty R. Padma, T. V. Sethuraman, T. V. Annapoorani	
Vaamana Avatharam	Prem Chethna	Lakshmi Films		T. R. Mahalingam, Meenalochana, V. V. S. Mani, Parvathi, R. Balasubramaniam, Nirmala, Gomathi Bai	
Venuganan		Jewel Pictures	G. Govindarajulu Naidu	V. V. Sadagopan, N. C. Vasanthakokilam, Sandow M. M. A. Chinnappa Thevar	
Vikrama Urvashi or Urvasiyin Kaadhal	C. V. Raman	T. R. Sundaram, Modern Theatres	G. Ramanathan	C. V. V. Panthulu, C. S. Sulochana, G. Ramanathan, P. A. Rajamani, P. A. Periyanayaki, Kali N. Rathnam, C. T. Rajakantham, P. R. Mangalam	
Vimochanam	T. Marconi	Hindustan Films	Ramani	Hemalatha, Kanthamani, Baby Jaya, Indira, Bhagirathi, T. P. Sundari, Selva, Suguna	
