= List of Tamil films of 1957 =

Prior to the amendment of Tamil Nadu Entertainments Tax Act 1939 on 1 April 1958, Gross was 133.33 per cent of Nett for all films. Commercial Taxes Department disclosed ₹1.26 crore in entertainment tax revenue for the year.

The following is a list of films produced in the Tamil film industry in India in 1957, in alphabetical order.

== 1957 ==
Title	Director	Production	Music	Cast	Release date (D-M-Y)
Aandi Petra Selvan; Dubbed from Telugu	B. A. Subba Rao	B. A. S. Productions	T. Chalapathi Rao	N. T. Rama Rao, C. Lakshmi Rajyam, S. V. Ranga Rao, Master Sudhakar, Relangi	
Aravalli	S. V. Krishna Rao	Modern Theatres	G. Ramanathan	S. G. Eshwar, G. Varalakshmi, Mynavathi, V. Gopalakrishnan	22-10-1957
Alavudheenum Arputha Villakkum	T. R. Raghunath	Jaysakthi Pictures	S. Rajeswara Rao & S. Hanumantha Rao	A. Nageswara Rao, Anjali Devi, Rajasulochana, S. V. Ranga Rao, T. S. Balaiah	29-03-1957
Ambikapathi	P. Neelakantan	ALS Productions	G. Ramanathan	Sivaji Ganesan, P. Bhanumathi, M. K. Radha, V. Nagayya, M. N. Nambiar, Rajasulochana, N. S. Krishnan, T. A. Madhuram, K. A. Thangavelu, A. Karunanidhi, K. D. Santhanam	22-10-1957
Anbe Deivam	R. Nagendra Rao	R. N. R. Pictures	H. R. Padmanabha Sastri & Vijaya Bhaskar	R. Nagendra Rao, M. K. Radha, Sandhya, Sriranjani, Jr.	06-12-1957
Baagyavathi	L. V. Prasad	Ravi Production	S. Dakshinamurthy	Sivaji Ganesan, Padmini, K. A. Thangavelu, M. N. Rajam, K. Sarangapani, Ragini, P. D. Sambandam, Poobathi Nandharam, Lakshmi Prabha, K. N. Kamalam, K. Aranganayaki, Master Gopal	27-12-1957
Bhaktha Markandeya	B.S. Ranga	Vikram Production	Viswanathan–Ramamoorthy	R. Nagendra Rao, V. Nagayya, K. A. Thangavelu	02-01-1957
Chakravarthi Thirumagal	P. Neelakantan	Uma Pictures	G. Ramanathan	M. G. Ramachandran, Anjali Devi, P. S. Veerappa, S. Varalakshmi, N. S. Krishnan, T. A. Madhuram, K. A. Thangavelu, T. P. Muthulakshmi, E. R. Sahadevan, Lakshmi Prabha and dance by Ragini	18-01-1957
Engal Veettu Mahalakshmi	Adurthi Subba Rao	Annapurna Pictures	Master Venu	A. Nageswara Rao, Savitri, S. V. Ranga Rao, P. Kannamba, M. S. Sundari Bai	01-02-1957
Iru Sagodharigal	Vedantam Raghavayya	Narasu Studios	S. Rajeswara Rao	Gemini Ganesan, Savitri, Girija, M. N. Nambiar, T. S. Durairaj, V. K. Ramasamy, T. P. Muthulakshmi, C. K. Saraswathi	06-09-1957
Karpin Jothi; Dubbed from Telugu	Vedantam Raghavayya	Ashwaraj Films	P. Adinarayana Rao	A. Nageswara Rao, Anjali Devi, S. V. Ranga Rao	
Karpukkarasi	A. S. A. Sami	Jupiter Pictures	G. Ramanathan	Gemini Ganesan, Savitri, M. K. Radha, G. Varalakshmi, K. R. Chellam, R. Balasubramaniam, P. G. Vengadasalam, Mogana, E. V. Saroja and dance by Ragini	14-06-1957
M.L.A. Dubbed from Telugu	K. B. Tilak		Pendyala Nageswara Rao	Jaggayya, Savitri, Gummadi	
Magathala Nattu Mary	S. S. Rajan	Jaikumar Pictures	R. Parthasarathy	Sriram, Kumari Thangam, Raguveer, G. Sakunthala	20-12-1957
Magudam Katha Mangai (dubbed from Hindi)	Mohammed Husain		O. P. Nayyar	Padmini, Suresh, Ragini, Johnny Walker, Agha, Anwar Hussain, Kumar, Agha Miraz, Randhir, Helen	
Mahadhevi	Sundar Rao Nadkarni	Ganesh Movietone	Viswanathan–Ramamoorthy	M. G. Ramachandran, Savitri, P. S. Veerappa, M. N. Rajam, J. P. Chandrababu, T. P. Muthulakshmi, O. A. K. Thevar, A. Karunanidhi, Sattampillai Venkatraman, K. R. Ramsingh	22-11-1957
Makkalai Petra Magarasi	K. Somu	Sri Lakshmi Pictures	K. V. Mahadevan	Sivaji Ganesan, P. Bhanumathi, P. Kannamba, M. N. Nambiar, M. N. Rajam, V. K. Ramasamy, K. Sarangapani, E. R. Sahadevan, P. D. Sambandham, V. M. Ezhumalai, T. P. Muthulakshmi, C. T. Rajakantham	27-02-1957
Mallika	Joseph Thaliath Jr.	The Citadel Film Corporation P Limited	T. R. Pappa	Gemini Ganesan, Padmini, K. A. Thangavelu	19-07-1957
Manaalane Mangaiyin Baakkiyam	Vedantam Raghavayya	Anjali Pictures	P. Adinarayana Rao	Gemini Ganesan, Anjali Devi, Rajasulochana, Girija, Kanchana	24-05-1957
Manamagan Thevai	P. S. Ramakrishna Rao	Bharani Pictures	G. Ramanathan	Sivaji Ganesan, P. Bhanumathi, J. P. Chandrababu, T. R. Ramachandran, A. Karunanidhi, Devika, Ragini	17-05-1957
Mayabazar	K. V. Reddy	Vijaya Vahini Studios	Ghantasala & S. Rajeswara Rao	N. T. Rama Rao, Gemini Ganesan, Savitri, S. V. Ranga Rao, K. A. Thangavelu, M. N. Nambiar, Rushyendramani, Sandhya, D. Balasubramaniam, R. Balasubramaniam, Lakshmi Prabha, E. R. Sahadevan, C. T. Rajakantham, V. M. Ezhumalai, Nagabhushanam, Allu Rama Lingaiah, Vangara Venkata Subbaiah, Madhavapeddi Satyam	12-04-1957
Mudhalali	Muktha Srinivasan	MAV Pictures	K. V. Mahadevan	S. S. Rajendran, Devika, M. N. Rajam, T. K. Ramachandran, Ennatha Kannaiya, C. T. Rajakantham	22-10-1957
Neelamalai Thirudan	M. A. Thirumurugan	Devar Films	K. V. Mahadevan	Ranjan, Anjali Devi, M. K. Radha, P. Kannamba	20-09-1957
Pakka Thirudan; Dubbed from Telugu	P. Chengayya	Chandamama Films	T. M. Ibrahim	Akkineni Nageswara Rao, Jamuna, G. Varalakshmi, E. V. Saroja (Dance), Helen (Dance)	
Pathini Deivam	Ch. Narayanamurthy	V. R. V. Productions	Viswanathan–Ramamoorthy	G. Varalakshmi, K.A. Thangavelu	
Kanyadhanam/Pathiye Deivam; Dubbed from Telugu Kanyadhanam of 1955	B. Vittalacharya	Vittal Productions	M. Ranga Rao	Kanta Rao, Sowkar Janaki, Waheeda Rehman, Surabhi Balasaraswathi, 'Appa' Duraisamy	
Pudhaiyal	Krishnan–Panju	Kamal Brothers	Viswanathan–Ramamoorthy	Sivaji Ganesan, Padmini, M. K. Radha, T. S. Balaiah, J. P. Chandrababu, M. N. Rajam, D. V. Narayanasami, M. R. Santhanalakshmi, O. A. K. Thevar, S. A. Asokan	10-05-1957
Pudhu Vayal	Krishnan–Panju	National Pictures	Govardhan	Mainavathi, Prem Nazir, S.S. Rajendran	
Pudhumai Pithan	T. R. Ramanna	Sivakami Pictures	G. Ramanathan	M. G. Ramachandran, T. R. Rajakumari, B. S. Saroja, J. P. Chandrababu, E. V. Saroja, T. S. Balaiah, K. S. Angamuthu, E. R. Sahadevan, R. Balasubramaniam, P. G. Venkadachalam	02-08-1957
Pudhu Vazhvu	M. K. Thyagaraja Bhagavathar	Sarvodaya Pictures P Limited	G. Ramanathan & C. N. Pandurangan	M.K.Thyagaraja Bhagavathar, Madhuri Devi, Lalitha	08-03-1957
Raja Rajan	T. V. Sundaram	Neela Productions	K. V. Mahadevan	M. G. Ramachandran, Padmini, Lalitha, P. S. Veerappa, M. N. Nambiar, M. G. Chakrapani, Friend Ramasami, G. Sakunthala, R. Balasubramaniam, S. D. Subbulakshmi	26-04-1957
Rani Lalithangi	T. R. Raghunath	T. N. R. Productions	G. Ramanathan	Sivaji Ganesan, P. Bhanumathi, Rajasulochana, P. S. Veerappa, K. A. Thangavelu, Serukulathur Sama, K. Sarangapani, R. Balasubramaniam, S. D. Subbulakshmi, T. P. Muthulakshmi, M. Saroja	21-09-1957
Samaya Sanjeevi	V. S. Raghavan	Sri Nataraja Films	G. Ramanathan	T. R. Ramachandran, M. N. Rajam, Sandhya, M. N. Nambiar	09-03-1957
Sathiyavan Savithri; Dubbed from Telugu	K. B. Nagabhushanam	Vijayalakshmi Pictures	S. Rajeswara Rao	Akkineni Nageswara Rao, S. V. Ranga Rao, S. Varalakshmi	
Soubhagyavathi	Jampana	Nandhi Pictures	Pendyala Nageswara Rao & M. S. Gnanamani	Gemini Ganesan, Savitri, S. V. Ranga Rao	22-10-1957
Thangamalai Ragasiyam	B. R. Panthulu	Padmini Pictures	T. G. Lingappa	Sivaji Ganesan, T. R. Rajakumari, M. V. Rajamma, Jamuna, B.Saroja devi, P. S. Veerappa, M. N. Nambiar, T. R. Ramachandran, K. Sarangapani, K. S. Angamuthu	29-06-1957
Vanangamudi	P. Pullaiah	Saravanabhava & Unity Pictures	G. Ramanathan	Sivaji Ganesan, Savitri, M. K. Radha, V. Nagayya, P. Kannamba, M. N. Nambiar, Rajasulochana, K. A. Thangavelu, M. Saroja, Gemini Balu, Nott Annaji Rao, M. R. Santhanam, Thangappan	12-04-1957
Yaar Paiyyan	T. R. Raghunath	Vijaya Vauhini Studios	S. Dakshinamurthy	Gemini Ganesan, Savitri, Daisy Irani, N. S. Krishnan, T. A. Madhuram, T. R. Ramachandran, Surabhi Balasaraswathi, K. Sarangapani, M. K. Mustafa, C. S. Pandiyan, P. S. Gnanam, Vidhyavathi, V. Nagayya, V. K. Ramasamy	26-07-1957
