= List of Tamil films of 1958 =

Prior to the amendment of Tamil Nadu Entertainments Tax Act 1939 on 1 April 1958, Gross was 133.33 per cent of Nett for all films. Post-G.O., Gross jumped to 140 per cent of Nett Commercial Taxes Department disclosed ₹1.7 crore in entertainment tax revenue for the year.

The following is a list of films produced in the Tamil film industry in India in 1958, in alphabetical order.

== 1958 ==
Title	Director	Production	Music	Cast	Release date (D-M-Y)
Aalai Kandu Mayangathe		Thanjai N. Ramaiah Dass			
Anbu Engey	D. Yoganand	Jubilee Films	Vedha	S. S. Rajendran, K. Balaji, Devika, Mynavathi	12-12-1958
Annaiyin Aanai	Ch. Narayana Murthy	Paragon Pictures	S. M. Subbaiah Naidu	Sivaji Ganesan, Savithri, Pandari Bai, S. V. Ranga Rao, M. N. Nambiar, M. N. Rajam, M. R. Santhanam, Kuladeivam V. R. Rajagopal, T. P. Muthulakshmi	04-07-1958
Arasaala Piranthavan; Dubbed from Telugu	K. S. Ramachandra Rao	Sri Gnanambika Pictures	Nallam Nageswara Rao	A. Nageswara Rao, Sriranjani Jr.	
Athisaya Thirudan	P. Pullaiah	Sahini Art Production	S. Dakshinamurthi & K. Prasad Rao	Gemini Ganesan, K. Savitri, K. A. Thangavelu, T. S. Balaiah, V. Nagayya, V. M. Ezhumalai, T. P. Muthulakshmi, K. N. Kamalam	31-12-1958
Avan Amaran	S. Balachander	The People Films	T. M. Ibrahim	K. R. Ramasamy, Rajasulochana, P. Kannamba, T. S. Balaiah	23-05-1958
Baktha Ravana; Dubbed from Telugu	K. Shankar	AVM Productions	R. Sudarsanam, R. Govardhanam	N. T. Rama Rao, A. Nageswara Rao, Jamuna, Vijaya Nirmala, B. Saroja Devi	20-03-1958
Bhoologa Rambai	D. Yoganand	Ashoka Pictures	C. N. Pandurangan	Gemini Ganesan, Anjali Devi, M. N. Nambiar, Rajasulochana	14-01-1958
Bommai Kalyanam	R. M. Krishnaswamy	Aruna Films	K. V. Mahadevan	Sivaji Ganesan, Jamuna, Mynavathi, V. Nagayya, S. V. Ranga Rao, Santha Kumari, Rushyendramani, Friend Ramasamy, Kaka Radhakrishnan, M. S. Sundari Bai	03-05-1958
Chenchu Lakshmi	B. A. Subba Rao	Majalakshmi Pictures	S. Rajeswara Rao	A. Nageswara Rao, Anjali Devi, Pushpavalli, S. V. Ranga Rao, K. A. Thangavelu	14-04-1958
Engal Kudumbam Perisu	B. R. Panthulu	Padmini Pictures	T. G. Lingappa	B. R. Panthulu, M. V. Rajamma, B. Saroja Devi	14-06-1958
Illarame Nallaram	P. Pullaiah	Narayanan & Company	K. G. Moorthy	Gemini Ganesan, Anjali Devi, B. Saroja Devi, V. Nagayya, M. V. Rajamma, K. Suryakala	01-08-1958
Kadan Vaangi Kalyaanam	L. V. Prasad	Vijaya Vauhini Studios	S. Rajeswara Rao	Gemini Ganesan, Savitri, T. R. Ramachandran, Jamuna, S. V. Ranga Rao, T. S. Balaiah, K. A. Thangavelu, E. V. Saroja, V. M. Ezhumalai	17-09-1958
Kanniyin Sabatham	T. R. Raghunath	Jupiter Pictures & ALS Production	T. G. Lingappa	K. R. Ramasamy, Anjali Devi, Rajasulochana	10-01-1958
Kaathavaraayan	T. R. Ramanna	RR Pictures	G. Ramanathan	Sivaji Ganesan, Savitri, P. Kannamba, T. S. Balaiah, K. A. Thangavelu, J. P. Chandrababu, M. N. Rajam, E. V. Saroja, O. A. K. Thevar, E. R. Sahadevan	07-11-1958
Kudumba Gouravam	B. S. Ranga	Vikram Production	Viswanathan–Ramamoorthy	Gemini Ganesan, Savitri, S. V. Ranga Rao, P. Kannamba	28-02-1958
Maalaiyitta Mangai	G. R. Nathan	Kannadasan Films	Viswanathan–Ramamoorthy	T. R. Mahalingam, Pandari Bai, Mynavathi, Manorama	27-06-1958
Manamalai	Ch.Narayanamurthy	Janatha Pictures	Vedha	Gemini Ganesan, Savitri, J. P. Chandrababu	14-02-1958
Manamulla Maruthaaram	W. R. Subba Rao & M. S. Ramanathan	Padma Films	K. V. Mahadevan	K. Balaji, B. Saroja Devi, K. A. Thangavelu, Manorama, Nagesh	19-09-1958
Mangalya Bhagyam	T. R. Ragunath	Krishna Pictures	G. Ramanathan	K. Balaji, Padmini, Ragini	10-11-1958
Maya Manithan	T. P. Sundaram	Southern Pictures	G. Govindarajulu Naidu	Sriram, Chandrakantha, S. A. Asokan	07-11-1958
Naan Valartha Thangai	Ch. Narayanamurthy	Saravanabava Unity Pictures	Pendyala Nageswara Rao	Prem Nazir, Mynavathi, R. S. Manohar, Pandari Bai	10-11-1958
Nadodi Mannan	M. G. Ramachandran	Em. Gee. Yar Pictures	S. M. Subbaiah Naidu & N. S. Balakrishnan	M. G. Ramachandran, P. Bhanumathi, M. N. Rajam, B. Saroja Devi, P. S. Veerappa, M. N. Nambiar, J. P. Chandrababu, G. Sakunthala, T. P. Muthulakshmi, M. G. Chakrapani, E. R. Sahadevan, K. R. Ramsingh, K. S. Angamuthu	22-08-1958
Nalla Idathu Sammandham	K. Somu	Sri Lakshmi Pictures	K. V. Mahadevan	M. R. Radha, Sowcar Janaki, Prem Nazir, M. N. Rajam, V. M. Ezhumalai	14-02-1958
Neelavukku Neranja Manasu	K. Somu	Royal Filma	K. V. Mahadevan	Sriram, Pandari Bai, T. R. Ramachandran, Ragini, M. N. Rajam, K. A. Thangavelu, T. P. Muthulakshmi, P. S. Veerappa, P. D. Sambandam, M. R. Santhanam, V. M. Ezhumalai	26-09-1958
Paanai Pidithaval Bhaagyasaali	T. S. Durairaj	Maragatha Pictures	S. V. Venkatraman & S. Rajeswara Rao	Savitri, T. S. Durairaj, K. Balaji, T. P. Muthulakshmi, V. S. Raghavan	10-01-1958
Pathi Bakthi	A. Bhim Singh	Buddha Pictures	Viswanathan–Ramamoorthy	Sivaji Ganesan, Gemini Ganesan, Savitri, M. N. Rajam, T. S. Balaiah, V. Nagayya, K. A. Thangavelu, J. P. Chandrababu, M. Saroja, K. D. Santhanam, A. Krishnan, A. Rama Rao, C. R. Vijayakumari, C. K. Saraswathi, K. S. Angamuthu, K. Malathi	14-03-1958
Paattaliyin Sabatham (dubbed from Hindi)	B. R. Chopra	B. R. Films	O. P. Nayyar	Dilip Kumar, Vyjayanthimala, Ajit, Jeevan, Chand Usmani, Johnny Walker, Nazir Hussain, Manmohan Krishna, Leela Chitnis and dance by Kumkum and Minoo Mumtaz	
Peria Koil	A. K. Velan	Arunachalam Pictures	K. V. Mahadevan	P. Kannamba, Prem Nazir, M. N. Rajam	16-09-1958
Petra Maganai Vitra Annai	V. Ramanathan	Modern Theatres	Viswanathan–Ramamoorthy	S. S. Rajendran, C. R. Vijayakumari, R. S. Manohar, Pandari Bai	30-05-1958
Pillai Kaniyamudhu	M. A. Thirumugam	PSV Pictures	K. V. Mahadevan	S. S. Rajendran, E. V. Saroja, P. S. Veerappa, M. N. Rajam	30-05-1958
Sabaash Meena	B. R. Panthulu	Padmini Pictures	T. G. Lingappa	Sivaji Ganesan, J. P. Chandrababu, Malini, B. Sarojadevi, S. V. Ranga Rao, B. R. Panthulu, Kula Dheivam V. R. Rajagopal, D. Balasubramaniam, M. R. Santhanam	03-10-1958
Sampoorna Ramayanam	K. Somu	MAV Pictures	K. V. Mahadevan	Sivaji Ganesan, N. T. Rama Rao, Padmini, P. V. Narasimha Bharathi, V. K. Ramasamy, M. N. Rajam, V. Nagayya, S. D. Subbulakshmi, G. Varalakshmi, T. K. Baghavathi, Sandhya	14-04-1958
Sarangadhara	V. S. Raghavan	Minerva Pictures	G. Ramanathan	Sivaji Ganesan, P. Bhanumathi, Rajasulochana, S. V. Ranga Rao, Santha Kumari, M. N. Nambiar, Valaiyapathi G. Muthukrishnan, A. Karunanidhi, T. P. Muthulakshmi	15-08-1958
Sathi Anusuya; Dubbed from Telugu	K. B. Nagabhushanam	Rajyasri Productions	T. M. Ibrahim (Ghantasala for Telugu version)	N. T. Rama Rao, Anjali Devi, Jamuna	
Sengottai Singam	V. N. Reddy	Devar Films	K. V. Mahadevan	Uthayakumar, B. Sarojadevi, S. V. Sahasranamam, Pandari Bai, T. S. Balaiah, Mainavathi, P. S. Veerappa, Sandow M. M. A. Chinnappa Thevar	11-07-1958
Senjulakshmi	P. A. Subbarao	P. A. S. Productions	S. Rajeswara Rao	A. Nageswara Rao, Anjali Devi, S. V. Ranga Rao, K. A. Thangavelu, Sandhya, K. S. Angamuthu, E. R. Sahadevan, Pushpavalli	28-05-1958
Sri Rama Bhaktha Hanuman; Dubbed from Hindi	Babubhai Mistry	Basant Pictures	Chitragupta	Mahipal, Anita Guha, B. M. Vyas, Krishna Kumari, S. N. Tripathi, Soodesh Kumar, Amirbai Karnataki, Ratnamala, Kanchanmala, Helen, Sheela Vaz, Pravin Paul	
Thai Pirandhal Vazhi Pirakkum	A. K. Velan	Arunachalam Pictures	K. V. Mahadevan	S. S. Rajendran, Prem Nazir, M. N. Rajam, Rajasulochana	14-01-1958
Thedi Vandha Selvam	P. Neelakantan	Arasu Pictures	T. G. Lingappa	S. S. Rajendran, Rajasulochana, B.Saroja Devi	16-07-1958
Thirudargal Jakkirathai	B. N. Rao	Pratibha Films	K. V. Mahadevan	S. S. Rajendran, G. Varalakshmi, Girija	22-06-1958
Thirumanam	A. Bhim Singh	Valampuri Pictures Limited	S. M. Subbaiah Naidu	Gemini Ganesan, Savitri, K. A. Thangavelu	18-07-1958
Uthama Puthiran	T. Prakash Rao	Venus Pictures	G. Ramanathan	Sivaji Ganesan, Padmini, P. Kannamba, Ragini, M. N. Nambiar, M. K. Radha, K. A. Thangavelu, Stunt Somu, M. S. S. Bakkiam, P. S. Vengadasalam	07-02-1958
Vanji Kottai Valipan	S. S. Vasan	Gemini Studios	C. Ramchandra	Gemini Ganesan, Vyjayanthimala, Padmini, P. S. Veerappa, T. K. Shanmugam, P. Kannamba, S. V. Subbaiah, M. S. Sundari Bai, K. A. Thangavelu, T. P. Muthulakshmi, Daisy Irani	12-04-1958
Veera Amarsingh; Dubbed from Hindi	Jaswant Zaveri		T. G. Lingappa; Lyrics: Kuyilan	Jairaj, Nirupa Roy, Murad, Veena, Ramesh Sinha, Raaj Kumar, Helen, Nasir	
Veettukku Vandha Varalakshmi (Dubbed from Telugu)	B. N. Reddy	Ponnaluri brothers	Pendyala Nageswara Rao	N. T. Rama Rao, Jamuna, Sowcar Janaki, Relangi	
Zimbo; Dubbed from Hindi	Homi Wadia	Basant Studios	Chitragupta; VijayaBhaskar	Azad, Krishna Kumari, Chitra, Achla Sachdev, Sheikh, Dalpat, B. M. Vyas, Uma Dutt, Sardar Mansoor, Adeeb, Habib and Pedro the Chimpanzee	
