= Gevacolor =

Belgian color motion picture process

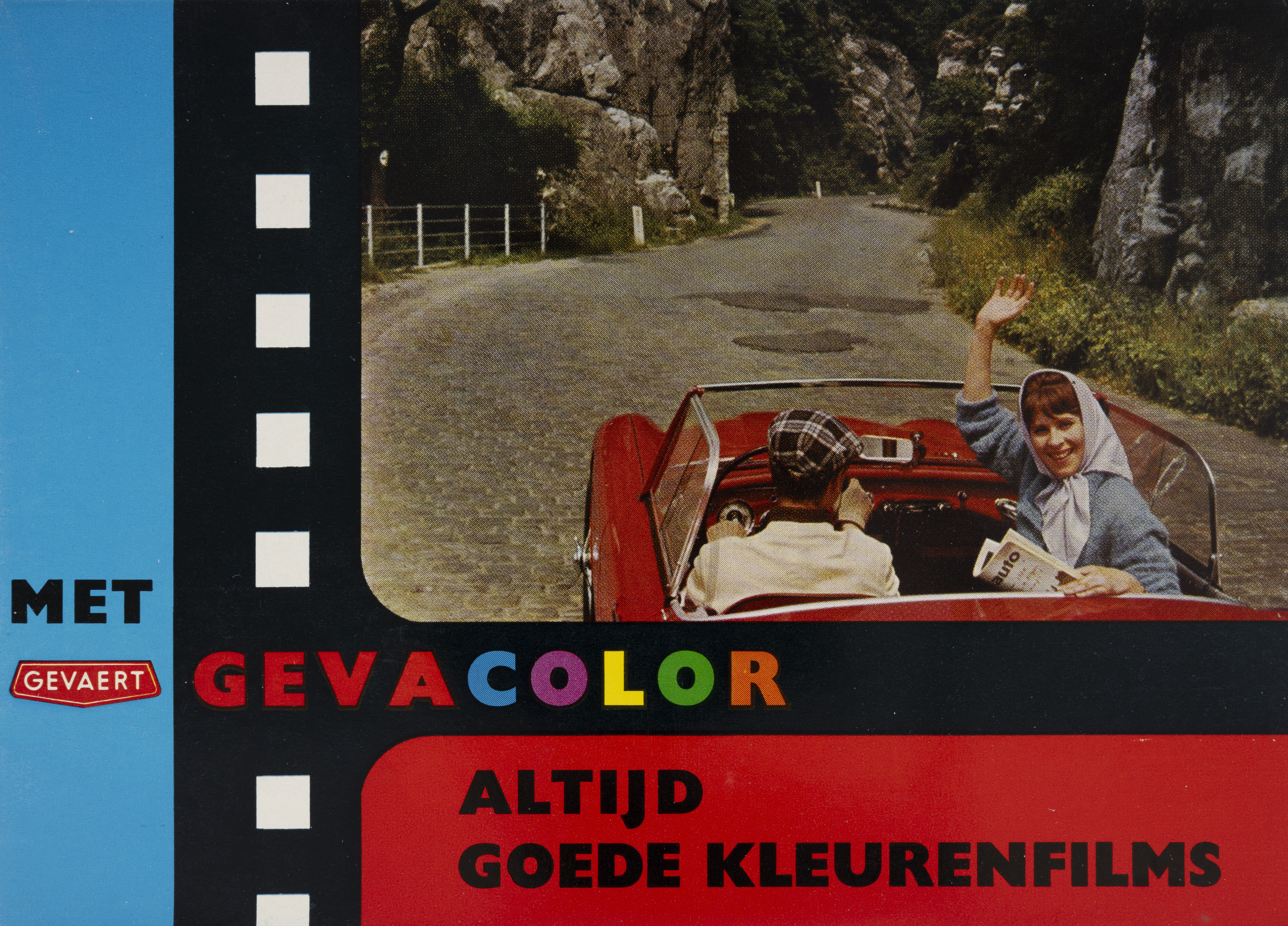
Advertisement for Gevacolor-film in Dutch. Year unknown.

Gevacolor is a color motion picture process. It was introduced in 1947 by Gevaert in Belgium, and an affiliate of Agfacolor. The process and company flourished in the 1950s as it was suitable for on location shooting. Both the companies merged in 1964 to form Agfa-Gevaert, and continued producing film stock till the 1980s.

== History ==
Although Gevacolor was first produced by Gevaert in 1947, the brand name was only protected three years later, due to the company assuming no-one else would claim the name. In their internal magazine Foto-dienst, the company specified the two initial types of Gevacolor: one for filming by daylight and one for filming by artificial light. Both were available in small format film (35mm).

While there are claims that Gevaert was the first company to produce color film in the post-war period, Roosens doubts this claim. Ferrania had already produced a diapositive film during 1942-1944, and again in 1951. Furthermore, in 1946, color film using Agfacolor technology was being produced under Soviet supervision in a factory in Shostka, under the brand name Sovcolor.

In 1954/5, it was used for Jedda, reputedly Australia's first feature film to be shot in color by Carl Kayser (1909-84).

== List of films taken in Gevacolor ==
=== Bangladeshi films ===
Title	Color	Year	Notes	Ref.
Narom Garom	Gevacolor	Unknown	First feature Bangla film shot in Gevacolor.	

=== Pakistani films ===
Title	Color	Year	Notes	Ref.
Mera Naam Hai Mohabbat	Gevacolor	1975		

=== Turkish films ===
Title	Color	Year	Notes	Ref.
Çanakkale Aslanları	Gevacolor	1964		

=== European films ===
Title	Color	Year	Notes	Ref.
La maison du printemps	Gevacolor	1949	First ever film shot in Gevacolor.	
Lúdas Matyi	Gevacolor	1950	First feature film in Hungary to be shot in Gevacolor.	
Ivo Caprino	Gevacolor	1950	The film was Ivo Caprino's second puppet film. Since Caprino used his own puppet movement system, which allowed him to move the puppets continuously in front of the camera while the camera was rolling, this film is considered the first 35mm feature film in Norway to be shot in color and to also use the Gevacolor system.	
Blaubart	Color	1951	Shot in Gevacolor.	
The Heath is Green	Gevacolor	1951		
Cet âge est sans pitié	Gevacolor	1952		
Senza veli	Gevacolor	1952		
Imperial Violets	Gevacolor	1952		
Tarantella napoletana	Gevacolor	1953		
The Lady of the Camellias	Gevacolor	1953		
L'uomo, la bestia e la virtù	Partly in colour	1953	Some scenes were shot in Gevacolor.	
La nave delle donne maledette	Gevacolor	1953		
Königliche Hoheit	Gevacolor	1953	For legal reasons, German films shot on Gevacolor had a disclaimer: "Gevacolor nach Agfa und Gevaert Patenten".	
Joan of Arc at the Stake	Gevacolor	1954		
Orient Express	Gevacolor	1954		
Le comte de Montechristo	Gevacolor	1954		
Quay of Blondes	Gevacolor	1954		
Suspiros de Triana	Gevacolor	1955		
India: Matri Bhumi	Gevacolor	1958	First documentary-hybrid film to be shot in Gevacolor.	
The Devil's Nightmare	Gevacolor	1971		
El asesino de muñecas	Gevacolor	1975		
L'albero degli zoccoli	1978	Last ever film shot in Gevacolor.		

=== Indian films ===
Title	Color	Year	Notes	Ref.
Kalyaanam Pannippaar	Partly in colour	1952	First Tamil and South Indian film with a colour sequence. Song sequence of "Engu Sendraayo" filmed in colour.	
Shahenshah	Gevacolor	1953	First full length Indian movie shot in Gevacolor.	
Succa Jhoota	Gevacolor	1953	First full length Indian movie shot in Gevacolor.	
Prisoner of Golconda	Gevacolor	1954		
Kanavaney Kankanda Deivam	Partly in colour	1955	Second Tamil film to have colour sequence. Song sequence of "Jagajothiye" and ending dance sequence in colour.	
Alibabavum 40 Thirudargalum	Colour	1956	First full length Tamil colour film	
Marma Veeran	Partly in colour	1956	Tamil film. Some scenes shot in colour.	
Kannin Manigal	Partly in colour	1956	Contains sequences in Gevacolor. Tamil film.Lost film.	
Thangamalai Ragasiyam	Partly in colour	1957	Tamil film. Sequence of the song "Ehalogame" in colour	
Rathnagiri Rahasya	Partly in colour	1957	Kannada film. Sequence of a song in colour	
Ambikapathy	Partly in colour	1957	Tamil film. Sequence of duet songs in colour	
Allaudinum Arputha Vilakkum	Partly in colour	1957	Tamil film. Song sequence of "Chelaadum Neerodai Meethae" in colour	
Allavuddin Adbhuta Deepam	Partly in colour	1957	Telugu film. One song sequence in color	
Nadodi Mannan	Partly in colour	1958	Tamil film. Second half in colour	
Illarame Nallaram	Partly in colour	1958	Tamil film. Dance sequence by Saroja Devi and Kumari Kamala in colour.	
Engal Kudumbam Perisu	Partly in colour	1958	Tamil film. Children's dance drama in colour	
School Master	Partly in colour	1958	Kannada film. Children's dance drama in colour	
Appu Chesi Pappu Koodu	Partly in colour	1958	Telugu film. A dance sequence in color	
Thirumanam	Partly in colour	1958	Tamil film. Dance sequence by Gopi Krishna, Kumari Kamala and B. Sarojadevi in colour. This is a lost film with no surviving prints.	
Minnal Veeran	Partly in colour	1959	Tamil film. Some sequences in color.	
Deiva Balam	Partly in colour	1959	Tamil film. Second half of the film and other segments in colour.	
Daiva Balam	Partly in colour	1959	Telugu film. Second half of the film and other segments in colour.	
Veerapandiya Kattabomman	Gevacolor	1959	Tamil film. Shot entirely in Gevacolor, then prints released in Technicolor.	
Athisaya Penn	Partly in Gevacolor	1959	Tamil film. Film was shot in Gevacolor. The climax of this film was shot in Technicolor for 45 minutes.	
Adutha Veetu Penn	Partly in colour	1960	Tamil film. The song "Enakkaga Nee Raja" was shot in colour.	
Kuzhandhaigal Kanda Kudiyarasu	Partly in colour	1960	Tamil film. Some parts of the film appeared in colour.	
Pillalu Techina Challani Rajyam	Partly in colour	1960	Telugu film. Some parts of the film appeared in colour.	
Makkala Rajya	Partly in colour	1960	Kannada film. Some parts of the film appeared in colour.	
Runanubandham	Partly in colour	1960	Telugu film .	
Sri Valli	Colour	1961	Tamil film.	
Sabarimala Sri Ayyappan	Colour	1961	Only Malayalam film in Gevacolor	
Kappalottiya Thamizhan	Partly in colour	1961	Tamil film. A song sequence shot in colour.	
Aradhana	Partly in colour	1962	Telugu film. Song sequence of "Ohoho Mavayya" in colour.	
Lava Kusa	Gevacolor	1963	Last Tamil film to be shot in Gevacolor.	
Lava Kusa	Gevacolor	1963	The first full length Telugu film to be shot in Gevacolor.	

=== Malaysian films ===
Title	Color	Year	Notes	Ref.
Buloh Perindu	Gevacolor	1953	First feature film in Malaysia shot in Gevacolor.	
Ribut	Gevacolor	1956	Third colour film in Malaysia and the second Gevacolor film.	
Mahsuri	Gevacolor	1959	Third Gevacolor in Malaysia	

== See also ==
- List of film formats
- List of color film systems
- Imbibition
- List of early color feature films
