= Chandra Mohana =

1936 film by Raja Chandrasekhar

- Poster
- Directed by: Raja Chandrasekhar
- Story by: Kothamangalam Subbu
- Starring: M. K. Radha; T. N. Meenakshi
- Production company: Mohan Movietone
- Release date: 1936
- Country: India
- Language: Tamil

Chandra Mohana, also known as Samooga Thondu (transl. Social service) is a 1936 Indian Tamil-language film directed by Raja Chandrasekhar. The film stars M. K. Radha and T. N. Meenakshi. It marks the cinematic debut of Kothamangalam Subbu who wrote the film's story.

== Plot ==
Chandra Mohan is a social activist in love with a young woman Mohana. The couple face numerous problems due to the plans of Kamalanathan, a mill manager.

== Cast ==
- M. K. Radha as Chandra Mohan
- S. V. Venkataraman as Kamalanathan
- T. N. Meenakshi as Mohana
- K. P. Kamakshi
- K. R. Jayalakshmi as the dancer
- ‘Clown’ M. S. Sundaram
- S. M. Subramaniam
- P. R. Mangalam

Dance

- Ragini Devi

== Production ==
The film marked the cinematic debut of writer, actor and filmmaker Kothamangalam Subbu, who wrote the film's story while M. Kandaswami Mudaliar wrote the dialogues. It was directed by Raja Chandrasekhar, and produced by the Madurai-based Mohan Movietone. Shooting took place at the Bombay-based Film City Studios. The film had an alternate title, Samooga Thondu. There is no known information on the film's music composer and lyricist.

== Release and reception ==
A reviewer for Malaya Tribune positively reviewed the film for the performances of the cast. The film was an average success.
