= Moondru Pillaigal =

1952 film by R. Nagendra Rao

- Theatrical release poster
- Directed by: Nagendra Rao
- Screenplay by: Veppathur Kittu
- Story by: Gemini Story Depart.
- Produced by: S. S. Vasan
- Starring: Kannamba; Nagendra Rao; M. K. Radha; Sriram; Ganesh
- Cinematography: M. Natarajan
- Edited by: N. R. Krishnaswamy
- Music by: P. S. Anantharaman; M. D. Parthasarathy (Supervisor)
- Production company: Gemini Studios
- Release date: 11 July 1952
- Country: India
- Languages: Tamil; Telugu

Moondru Pillaigal (transl. Three Sons) is a 1952 Indian Tamil-language drama film produced by S. S. Vasan. Based on Victor Fleming's 1927 American film The Way of All Flesh, it is about a couple and their three sons. The film was directed by Nagendra Rao and stars himself alongside Kannamba, with M. K. Radha, Gemini Ganesan and Sriram in supporting roles. It was simultaneously produced and released in Telugu under the title Mugguru Kodukulu. The film failed at the box office, which led to Vasan destroying all copies of it, thus making it a lost film.

== Plot ==
Gunavathi and Somasekhar have three sons together. The youngest one takes responsibility for a theft allegedly committed by his other two brothers and goes to jail. A dejected Somasekhar commits suicide and Gunavathi is abandoned by their other two sons. Later, when the youngest son is released from jail, he takes care of his mother despite being jobless. However, he receives an offer from a film company to act as the main character in their film which is based on the Ramayana. He succeeds in his job and manages to unite the family.

== Cast ==
Adapted from the respective song books:

Cast (Tamil)	Cast (Telugu)	Role (Tamil)	Role (Telugu)
Kannamba		Gunavathi	Gunavathi
Nagendra Rao		Somasekhar	Somasekhar
M. K. Radha		Muthu (adult)	Prakasam (adult)
Sriram		Kannan (adult)	Ram (adult)
Ganesh		Sekhar (adult)	Gopal (adult)
Kumari Vanaja	Janaki	Kamala (Adult)	Kamala (Adult)
Sundari Bai		Pankajam	Kantham
Suryaprabha		Kamini	Chaya
G. Pattu Iyer	Pandit Rao	Ramadas	Ramadas
Narayana Rao		Film Producer	Film Producer
Chandra Babu		Music Director	Music Director
Vikatam Krishnamoorthi	Maddala Krishnamoorthi	Deaf Film Dealer	Deaf Film Dealer
S. Krishnamoorthy		Film Production Assistants	Film Production Assistants
Seetharaman		Film Production Assistants	Film Production Assistants
Sethumadhavan		Muthu (child)	Prakasam (child)
Sudhakar		Kannan (child)	Ram (child)
Sudhindra		Sekhar (child)	Gopal (child)
P. Seetha		Kamala's friend	Kamala's friend
K. Ramaswamy	Ramachandra Shastri	Master	Master
Venkat		Bar-at-Law	Bar-at-Law
B. Ramakrishna Rao		Marwari	Marwari
G. V. Sharma	Krishnappa	Amina	Amina
V. T. Kalyanam		Race Broker	Race Broker
Saraswathi		Susheela (adult)	Susheela (adult)
Rathna Papa		Muthu's daughter	Prakasam's daughter
Mohan		Muthu's son	Prakasam's son
Premakumari		Kamala (child)	Kamala (child)
B. H. Vijaya Rao		Doctor	Doctor
Balan		Sub-Inspector	Sub-Inspector
Velayutham		Old Metal Merchant	Old Metal Merchant
P. M. Devan	Indrasen	Office Proprietor	Office Proprietor
Bindu Madhavan		Film Director	Film Director
Ramanarasu		Production Manager	Production Manager
B. S. Padmanabha Rao		Naughty Student	Naughty Student
T. S. B. Rao		Jhatka Driver	Jhatka Driver
Sampath Kumar		Suresh	Suresh
Muthukrishna Reddy		Milkman	Milkman
—	V. P. Balaraman	Police Constable	Police Constable

== Production ==
The film was based on the 1927 American silent film The Way of All Flesh, directed by Victor Fleming. The family drama was successful in India, and was adapted into a film in Hindi titled Khazanchi (1941). The Hindi film was highly successful in Madras and ran for more than 25 weeks. Nagendra Rao, an established producer and director in Kannada cinema, was impressed by the film and decided to direct the Tamil adaptation. He approached the Tamil film producer S. S. Vasan of Gemini Studios who had earlier produced Apoorva Sagodharargal, in which Rao played a role. Although Vasan was initially reluctant he agreed to finance the film. It was simultaneously produced and released in Telugu under the title Mugguru Kodukulu. According to writer Ashokamitran, who was then associated with Gemini, novelist R. K. Narayan wrote a treatment for this film.

J. P. Chandrababu, who would later go on to become an established comedian in Tamil cinema, played a small role lasting a single sequence in the film. Savitri, who would later become an established actress in the Telugu and Tamil film industries, was to make her acting debut with this film. Ganesh (later known as Gemini Ganesan), who played a supporting role as one among the three sons in the film was also as a casting assistant with Gemini, the production company. He recommended her for a small role in the film; however, she was not selected for the role.

== Soundtrack ==
Tamil version

Music was composed by P. S. Anantharaman and supervised by M. D. Parthasarathy. The song "Antha Rama Sowndharyam" is set in the Carnatic raga known as Kedaragaula.

Song	Singer/s	Lyricist	Duration
"Vaazhvadhum Thaazhvadhum Panathale"	A. M. Rajah	Kothamangalam Subbu	02:39
"Unnarul Maraven Aiya"	N. L. Ganasaraswathi	Kothamangalam Subbu	
"Inbam Enna Solluven"	Jikki	Kothamangalam Subbu	02:40
"Maalai Tharitha Maharaasi"	(Radha) Jayalakshmi & P. Leela	Kothamangalam Subbu	02:43
"Kaalamenbadhu Anuhoolamaahil"	A. M. Rajah	Kothamangalam Subbu	02:22
"Indu Desa Pugazh Paaduvom"	T. A. Mothi	Kothamangalam Subbu	01:54
"Poorana Chandirane, Paripoorana Chandirane"	P. Leela	Kothamangalam Subbu	03:22
"Naan Konda Karuvinai"	M. S. Anuradha	Kothamangalam Subbu	03:22
"Antha Rama Sowndharyam"	M. L. Vasanthakumari & A. P. Komala	Arunasala Kavirayar (Rama Nadaga Keerthanai)	03:25
"Yaaridam Solluven"	P. Leela	V. Seetharaman	02:45

== Reception ==
Moondru Pillaigal failed at the box-office, which led to Vasan destroying all copies of it, thus making it a lost film. Ashokamitran said there was nothing "seriously wrong" with the film, but felt that "the audience just couldn't take another film about a family torn asunder in the fourth reel and reunited in the last."

== See also ==
- List of Tamil films of 1952

== Bibliography ==
- Ashokamitran (2016). Fourteen Years with Boss. India: Penguin Books. ISBN 978-0-14-342329-4.
