= Deiva Balam =

- Theatrical release poster
- Directed by: P. Vasanthakumar Reddy
- Written by: Udhayakumar
- Starring: K. Balaji; Jayashree; K. Sarangapani; Girija
- Cinematography: B. J. Reddy; W. R. Subba Rao
- Edited by: Rajan
- Music by: G. Aswathama
- Production company: Ponnaloori Brothers
- Distributed by: Semriya
- Release date: 11 July 1959
- Running time: 2:57:21 (15962 ft.)
- Country: India
- Language: Tamil

Deiva Balam (transl. Divine Power) is a 1959 Indian Tamil-language film directed by P. Vasanthakumar Reddy. The film stars K. Balaji and Jayashree. It was simultaneously shot in Telugu as Daiva Balam. This film is partly coloured by Gevacolor. It was released on 11 July 1959.

== Cast ==
The following list is compiled from the database of Film News Anandan and from the book Thiraikalanjiyam Part-1.

Male cast

- K. Balaji
- K. Sarangapani
- Kaka Radhakrishnan
- V. R. Rajagopal
- Gummadi

Female cast

- Jayashree
- Girija
- K. Malathi
- Padmini Priyadarshini

== Production ==
The film was produced by Ponnaloori Brothers under their own banner and was directed by P. Vasanthakumar Reddy. Uthayakumar wrote the dialogues. Cinematography was done by B. J. Reddy and W. R. Subba Rao while Rajan did the editing. D. Venugopalasamy handled the choreography. The film was made in Telugu with the title Daiva Balam with N. T. Rama Rao and Jayashree starring. This film was partly coloured by Gevacolor.

== Soundtrack ==
Music was composed by G. Aswathama.

Song	Singer/s	Lyricist	Duration (m:ss)
"Vaa Vaa Kaali Vaaraai Maakaali"	K. Rani & group	Lakshmanadas	
"Narasingamaai Vandhu Prahalaadhanai"	Vaidhehi	Lakshmanadas	
"Aanandhame Kondene"	Vaidhehi	Lakshmanadas	
"Koodaadha Nonbugal Palakodi"	Vaidhehi	A. Maruthakasi	
"Uravaana Ennudaiya Uthamanai"	Vaidhehi	A. Maruthakasi	
"Pongi Ezhum Ila Manasu Thudikudhu"	Vaidhehi	A. Maruthakasi	02:45
"Malarodu Vilaiyaadum"	P. B. Srinivas & S. Janaki	A. Maruthakasi	05:38
"Malarodu Vilaiyadum" (Pathos)	P. B. Srinivas & S. Janaki	A. Maruthakasi	
"En Manavaanil Aadum Rani"	P. B. Srinivas & S. Janaki	A. Maruthakasi	
"Nilavathu Thavari Pennaai Maari"	P. B. Srinivas & S. Janaki	A. Maruthakasi	03:32
"Kannan Rathai Kalandhadhu Pol"	P. B. Srinivas & S. Janaki	A. Maruthakasi	
"Theeya Sakthi Aththanaiyum"	Ghantasala	A. Maruthakasi	
"Varave Varaadhaa Mahizhve Tharaadhaa"	K.Rani & Udutha Sarojini	A. Maruthakasi	03:20
"Varave Varaadhaa Mahizhve Tharaadhaa"	K. Rani & S. Janaki	A. Maruthakasi	03:14
"Adichaa Adi Vayithila"	A. L. Raghavan & P. B. Srinivas	Thanjai N. Ramaiah Dass	02:12
"Kulla Nari Pola Kunthikittu"	K. Rani	Thanjai N. Ramaiah Dass	02:38

== Release ==
Deiva Balam was released on 11 July 1959, delayed from June.
