= List of Tamil films of 1952 =

The following is a list of films produced in the Tamil film industry in India in 1952, in alphabetical order.

== 1952 ==
Title	Director	Production	Music	Cast	Release date (D-M-Y)
Aan (Dubbed from Hindi)	Mehboob Khan	Mehboob Productions	Naushad	Dilip Kumar, Prem Nath, Nadira, Nimmi, Murad, Mukri, Cuckoo, Sheela Naik	
Amarakavi	F. Nagoor	Nagoor Cine Productions	G. Ramanathan[05] T. A. Kalyanam	M. K. Thyagaraja Bhagavathar, T. R. Rajakumari, B. S. Saroja, N. S. Krishnan, T. A. Madhuram, K. P. Kesavan, P. K. Saraswathi, K. A. Thangavelu	09-02-1952
Amma	K. Vembu	Associated Productions	V. Dakshinamoorthy[01]	Thikkurissy Sukumaran Nair, B. S. Saroja, Lalitha, Aranmula Ponnamma, M. N. Nambiar, T. S. Durairaj	06-12-1952
Andhaman Kaidhi	V. Krishnan	Radhakrishnan Films	G. Govindarajulu Naidu[01]	M. G. Ramachandran, Thikkurissy Sukumaran Nair, P. K. Saraswathi, M. S. Draupadhi, T. S. Balaiah, K. Sarangapani	14-03-1952
Aathmasanthi (Dubbed from Malayalam)	Joseph Thaliath Jr.	Geo Pictures	T. R. Pappa[02]	T. K. Madhavan Nair, Miss Kumari, Aranmula Ponnamma, S. P. Pillai, Neyyaattinkara Komalam	21-03-1952
Chinna Durai	T. R. Mahalingam	Sri Sukumar Productions	T. G. Lingappa	T. R. Mahalingam, S. Varalakshmi, G. Sakunthala, B. R. Panthulu, V. K. Ramasamy, T. K. Ramachandran, J. P. Chandrababu, S. R. Varalakshmi	22-08-1952
Dharma Devatha	P. Pullaiah	Ragini Films	C. R. Subburaman[03]{திஞா}	Santha Kumari, Mukkamala, Mudigonda Lingamurthy, Kaushik, Girija, Lalitha, Padmini, Relangi, K. S. Angamuthu, Baby Sachu	28-06-1952
En Thangai	Ch. Narayana Murthy	Asoka Pictures	C. N. Pandurangan[01]	M. G. Ramachandran, P. V. Narasimha Bharathi, Madhuri Devi, P. S. Govindan, E. V. Saroja, V. Susheela	31-05-1952
Ezhai Uzhavan	K. B. Nagabhushanam	Sri Raja Rajeswari Films	H. R. Padmanabha Sastry	M. Sriramamurthy, P. Kannamba, Anjali Devi, Relangi, T. P. Muthulakshmi, Lakshmiprabha	17-10-1951
Kaadu (dubbed from English)	William Berke; Ellis R. Dungan	Modern Theatres; Lippert Pictures	G. Ramanathan	Rod Cameron, Cesar Romero, Marie Windsor, M. N. Nambiar, Sulochana	01-08-1952
Kaliyugam	V. S. Dhrupad	Arunodaya Kalamandir	Vimal Kumar	S. M. Kumaresan, B. S. Saroja, P. G. Venkatesan, S. Nandhini, K. A. Thangavelu	01-03-1952
Kalyanam Pannippaar	L. V. Prasad	Vijaya Studios	Ghantasala & Master Venu	N. T. Rama Rao, G. Varalakshmi, Yandamuri Joga Rao, S. V. Ranga Rao, Savitri, C. V. V. Panthulu, Suryakantham	15-08-1952
Kalyani	Acharya; M. Masthan	Modern Theatres	G. Ramanathan; S. Dakshinamurthy	M. N. Nambiar, B. S. Saroja, M. G. Chakrapani, G. Sakunthala, D. Balasubramaniam, A. Karunanidhi, T. P. Muthulakshmi	21-06-1952
Kanchana	S. M. Sriramulu Naidu	Pakshiraja Studios	S. M. Subbaiah Naidu	K. R. Ramasamy, Lalitha, Padmini, Miss Kumari, Aranmula Ponnamma, T. S. Durairaj	01-05-1952
Kaadhal	P. S. Ramakrishna Rao	Bharani Studios	C. R. Subburaman	A. Nageswara Rao, P. Bhanumathi, Sriranjani Jr., C. S. R. Anjaneyulu, Relangi, Kasturi Siva Rao, Suryakantham, K. S. Angamuthu	14-06-1952
Kumari	R. Padmanaban	Rajeswari Films	K. V. Mahadevan[01]	M. G. Ramachandran, Sriranjani Jr., Madhuri Devi, Serukalathur Sama, T. S. Durairaj, C. T. Rajakantham, Pulimoottai Ramaswami, K. S. Angamuthu	11-04-1952
Maaya Rambai (Dubbed from Telugu)	T. P. Sundaram	N. B. Productions	Ogirala Ramachandra Rao	N. T. Rama Rao, Anjali Devi, K. Raghuramaiah, G. Varalakshmi, Kasturi Siva Rao	18-04-1952
Manavathi (simultaneously made in Telugu)	Y. V. Rao	Sarvodaya Films	B. Rajanikantha Rao; H. R. Padmanabha Sastry	C. H. Narayana Rao, Mukkamala, Sriranjani Jr., Madhuri Devi, G. Varalakshmi, P. K. Saraswathi, Relangi	---03-1952
Mappillai	T. R. Raghunath	National Pictures	T. R. Pappa; N. S. Balakrishnan	T. R. Ramachandran, P. K. Saraswathi, P. V. Narasimha Bharathi, P. S. Veerappa, R. Balasubramaniam, V. K. Ramasamy, K. A. Thangavelu, M. Saroja	07-11-1952
Moondru Pillaigal	R. Nagendra Rao	Gemini Studios	P. S. Anantharaman	M. K. Radha, R. Nagendra Rao, P. Kannamba, Gemini Ganesan, Sriram, Suryaprabha, Vanaja, Saraswathi, M. S. Sundari Bai, J. P. Chandrababu	11-07-1952
Panam	N. S. Krishnan	Madras Pictures	Viswanathan–Ramamoorthy[01]	Sivaji Ganesan, Padmini, N. S. Krishnan, T. A. Madhuram, K. A. Thangavelu, V. K. Ramasamy, S. S. Rajendran	27-12-1952
Parasakthi	Krishnan–Panju	National Pictures	R. Sudharsanam	Sivaji Ganesan, Sriranjani Jr., S. V. Sahasranamam, Pandari Bai, V. Susheela, S. S. Rajendran	17-10-1952
Pasiyin Kodumai	K. J. Mohan Rao	K & K Combines	P. S. Diwakar	Thikkurissy Sukumaran Nair, Prem Nazir, Kumari Thankam, Pankajavalli, S. P. Pillai	28-11-1952
Penn Manam	S. Soundarrajan	Tamil Nadu Talkies	Kunnakudi Venkatarama Iyer	T. K. Shanmugam, M. V. Rajamma, V. K. Ramasamy, M. N. Rajam, Pulimoottai Ramasami, C. T. Rajakantham, K. S. Angamuthu, T. P. Muthulakshmi, Kottapuli Jayaraman	05-12-1952
Priyasakhi (Dubbed from Malayalam)	G. R. Rao	Neela Productions	Brother Lakshmanan	Sathyan, B. S. Saroja, M. N. Nambiar, K. P. Kottarakkara, Miss Kumari, Kumari Thankam, Pankajavalli	13-09-1952
Puratchi Veeran (Dubbed from Hindi Badal (1951))	Amiya Chakravarty	Pakshiraja Films	Shankar Jaikishan	Madhubala, Prem Nath, Purnima, Agha	21-03-1952
Puyal	G. Vishwanathan	Peligan Pictures	S. G. K. Pillai; P. S. Diwakar	G. M. Basheer, M. V. Rajamma, A. K. Mohan, R. Lakshmidevi, S. Sakunthala	25-07-1952
Rani	L. V. Prasad	Jupiter Pictures	C. R. Subburaman	S. Balachander, P. Bhanumathi, S. V. Subbaiah, M. K. Mustafa, M. Saroja, G. M. Basheer, M. S. S. Bhagyam	26-04-1952
Shyamala	B. A. Subba Rao	Yuva Pictures	G. Ramanathan; T. V. Rajee; S. B. Dinakar Rao	M. K. Thyagaraja Bhagavathar, S. Varalakshmi, Relangi	29-11-1952
Thai Ullam	K. Ramnoth	Narayanan & Company	V. Nagayya; A. Rama Rao	R. S. Manohar, M.V. Rajamma, V. Nagayya, Gemini Ganesan, Madhuri Devi, Javar Seetharaman, J. P. Chandrababu, T. P. Muthulakshmi	09-02-1952
Valaiyapathi	T. R. Sundaram	Modern Theatres	S. Dakshinamurthi	G. Muthukrishnan, Sowcar Janaki, T. A. Jayalakshmi, K. K. Perumal, A. Karunanidhi, T. P. Muthulakshmi, M. S. S. Bhagyam, Pulimoottai Ramasami	17-10-1952
Velaikaran	P. V. Krishnan	Sri Valli Productions	R. Sudharshanam	T. R. Mahalingam, S. Varalakshmi, T. S. Balaiah, Madhuri Devi, V. K. Ramasamy, M. S. Draupadhi	23-05-1952
Zamindar	P. V. Krishnan	Jupiter Pictures; Sangeetha Pictures	G. Ramanathan	S. A. Natarajan, G. Muthukrishnan, M. V. Rajamma, Madhuri Devi, D. Balasubramaniam, V. M. Ezhumalai, T. P. Muthulakshmi	30-08-1952
