= Alladin and the Wonderful Lamp (1957 film) =

- Theatrical release poster
- Directed by: T. R. Raghunath
- Screenplay by: T. R. Raghunath; V. Srinivasan
- Based on: Aladdin from One Thousand and One Nights
- Produced by: M. L. Pathy
- Starring: Akkineni Nageswara Rao; Anjali Devi; S. V. Ranga Rao
- Cinematography: R. Sampath
- Edited by: S. A. Murugesan; M. Ramakrishnan
- Music by: S. Rajeswara Rao; S. Hanumantha Rao
- Production company: Jai Sakthi Pictures
- Release dates: 29 March 1957 (Tamil); 13 April 1957 (Telugu)
- Running time: 155 minutes
- Country: India
- Languages: Telugu; Tamil; Hindi

Alladin and the Wonderful Lamp, also known by its Telugu-language title Allauddin Adhbhuta Deepam, its Tamil-language title Allavudeenum Arputha Vilakkum, and its Hindi-language title Alladdin Ka Chirag, is a 1957 Indian fantasy film produced by M. L. Pathy on the Jai Sakthi Pictures banner and directed by T. R. Raghunath. The film stars Akkineni Nageswara Rao and Anjali Devi. It is an adaptation of the story of Aladdin from One Thousand and One Nights and filmed simultaneously in three different languages. Allavudeenum Arputha Vilakkum was released on 29 March 1957, and Allavuddin Adbhuta Deepam followed on 13 April. Alladin Ka Chirag was also released the same year.

== Cast ==
Adapted from Film News Anandan's database:

Male cast

- Akkineni Nageswara Rao as Alladin
- T. S. Balaiah as Yakub
- S. V. Ranga Rao as Jaffer
- Relangi as Syed (Telugu)
- K. A. Thangavelu as Syed (Tamil)
- V. K. Ramasamy
- E. R. Sahadevan
- M. R. Swaminathan
- Master Anand as young Alladin
- Pakkirisamy
- Rama Rao
- C. S. D. Singh
- Thodi Kannan
- V. K. Achari

Female cast

- Anjali Devi as Yasmin
- Rajasulochana as Sitara
- G. Sakunthala as Roshanara
- K. Malathi as Fathima
- Indira Acharya
- Saantha
- B. Jaya

== Production ==
The film is an adaptation of the story of Aladdin from One Thousand and One Nights. It was directed by T. R. Raghunath, produced by M. L. Pathy under Jai Sakthi Pictures, and simultaneously filmed in Tamil as Allavudeenum Arputha Vilakkum, Telugu as Allavuddin Adbhuta Deepam, and in Hindi as Alladdin Ka Chirag. Alladin and the Wonderful Lamp was used as the English title for the trilingual. The screenplay was written by Raghunath and V. Srinivasan. Akkineni Nageswara Rao starred as the title character. R. Sampath was the cinematographer, and S. A. Murugesan worked as editor. The sequence of the song "Seladum Neerodai Meethe" and its Telugu version was shot in Gevacolor, as the censor certificate of this film states as partly coloured. The Telugu version marked the first Telugu film to have colour sequence.

== Soundtrack ==
The soundtrack was composed by S. Rajeswara Rao & S. Hanumantha Rao.

All lyrics are written by Aarudhra.

Telugu
No.	Title	Singer(s)	Length
1.	"Andala Konetilona Sagindi"	A. M. Rajah, P. Susheela	3:11
2.	"Jamak Jamak"	P. Susheela
3.	"Tamaasha Dheepam Navīna Dheepam"	Pithapuram Nageswara Rao
4.	"Manasanta Needira"	P. Susheela	4:19
5.	"Ninu Valachi"	P. Susheela	5:34
6.	"Pillalangadi Pillalangadi Andala"	V. Satya Rao, P. Susheela & Swarnalatha
7.	"Pilla Pilla Raa"	P. Susheela	4:22
8.	"Sogasari Dananayya"	P. B. Sreenivas, K. Rani	3:45
9.	"Vacchanu Nee Kosame"	Jikki	4:15
10.	"Yavvana Mokate"	A. P. Komala, S. Hanumantha Rao	3:59
Total length:			29:25

Tamil
No.	Title	Lyrics	Singer(s)	Length
1.	"Selaadum Neerodai Meedhe"	Kannadasan	A. M. Rajah, P. Susheela	5:32
2.	"Jamak Jamak"		P. Susheela
3.	"Pazhaiya Deepam Thanthaal"	Villiputhan	Thiruchi Loganathan	3:59
4.	"Kannukku Nerile, Kalai Enra Perile"	Pattukkottai Kalyanasundaram	P. Susheela	3:42
5.	"Aasaiyudane En Raja Varuvaar"	A. Maruthakasi	P. Susheela	4:12
6.	"Thillaale Lam Thillaale"	Thamizholi	Usaindeen, Nithyakala, P. K. Saraswathi, Swarnalatha, C. N. Rajalakshmi
7.	"Kanni Penne Vaa"	A. Maruthakasi	P. Susheela	3:42
8.	"Samayam Vachchuthaiyaa"	M. P. Sivam	K. R. Sellamuthu, K. Rani	3:39
9.	"Unnaale Vandhenaiyaa"	A. Maruthakasi	Jikki	3:42
10.	"Inraikkiruppathu Onre Nijamena"	Lakshmanathas	A. P. Komala	3:23

== Release ==
Allavudeenum Arputha Vilakkum was released on 29 March 1957, and Allavuddin Adbhuta Deepam followed on 13 April. Alladin Ka Chirag was released in the same year.
