= Kanavane Kankanda Deivam =

1955 film by T. R. Raghunath

- Theatrical release poster
- Directed by: T. R. Raghunath
- Screenplay by: K. V. Srinivasan
- Story by: K. V. Srinivasan; Umachandran; Sadasivabrahmam
- Produced by: Pattanna; Narayana Iyengar
- Starring: R. Ganesh; Anjali Devi
- Cinematography: B. S. Ranga
- Edited by: S. R. Chandra Sekaran
- Music by: A. Rama Rao; Hemant Kumar
- Production company: Narayanan Company
- Release date: 6 May 1955
- Running time: 168 minutes
- Country: India
- Language: Tamil

Kanavane Kankanda Deivam (transl. Husband is a Palpable God) is a 1955 Indian Tamil-language fantasy film directed by T. R. Raghunath and produced by Pattanna. The film stars R. Ganesh and Anjali Devi, with V. Nagayya, M. N. Nambiar, Friend Ramaswamy and Lalitha in supporting roles. It revolves around a man who steals an object to cure the king's blindness and marry the princess, but becomes cursed because of the theft and seeks to undo it.

Kanavane Kankanda Deivam was released on 6 May 1955. The film received positive reviews mainly for the performances of Ganesh and Anjali Devi, and became a commercial success, running for over 100 days in many theatres. It was remade in Hindi as Devta (1956), with Ganesh and Anjali Devi reprising their roles.

== Plot ==
Vijayan, the son of a retired soldier Karunakaran, is advised by his father to meet Soorasimmar, the blind king, and join the army. Vijayan meets Soorasimmar's only daughter Nalini and falls in love with her. When commander Veerasenan tries to throw Vijayan aside for blocking his way, Vijayan fights and subdues Veerasenan. This impresses Nalini, who is on the way to meet a sage who has a medicine for her father's blindness.

After examining Soorasimmar, the sage says the only cure lies in using the "Naga Jothi" (serpent light) found in Nagalokam (serpent world). Nalini suggests a reward for anyone who brings the Naga Jothi. Soorasimmar agrees and announces that anyone bringing the Naga Jothi would be given any rewards they ask for.

Nalini falls in love with Vijayan when they next meet. The next day, Vijayan presents his father's knife to Soorasimmar who recognises it and advises Veerasenan to induct Vijayan into the army. Veerasenan is unhappy to see the entry of Vijayan, and waits for an opportunity to avenge his past humiliation.

When Vijayan meets Nalini in private, Veerasenan arrives with his soldiers, captures and accuses him of betraying Soorasimmar. For this, Soorasimmar orders Vijayan's execution the next day, despite Nalini's pleas. Vijayan escapes from prison with help from fellow prisoner Singan and comes to meet Nalini. He tells her that he will retrieve the Naga Jothi so that he can seek her hand as prize.

Vijayan saves Nagakanni, a snake girl, from danger. She gives him two magic rings which will lead to Nagalokam from any pond, and tells him he must please the snake queen Nagarani to obtain the Naga Jothi. Using the rings, Vijayan and Singan enter a pond and reach Nagalokam. Nagarani instantly falls in love with Vijayan and makes him stay at her palace. Singan advises Vijayan to pretend to love her and pilfer the key to the safe containing the Naga Jothi.

Vijayan makes Nagarani unconscious, takes the key, goes with Singan and collects a Naga Jothi while Singan takes one too. While returning, Singan accidentally locks himself in a prison cell. Nagarani awakens and notices the key is missing. Enraged, she curses Vijayan by transforming him into a deformed hunchback.

Vijayan explains his predicament and pleads for a remedy. Nagarani says he should marry a virtuous woman who must bear his son; that son should come through the cave using the Naga Jothi and take the glass stone containing Vijayan's youth and break it before Vijayan after which he will regain his original looks. She says this should be done within five years, Vijayan will be killed by a snake should he fail, and will die if he reveals this secret to anyone.

Vijayan returns and restores Soorasimmar's eyesight with the Naga Jothi. Vijayan seeks the hand of Nalini as his prize, which Soorasimmar objects to but Nalini accepts, and the marriage takes place. When Soorasimmar insults Vijayan for his looks, Nalini and Vijayan leave and settle in a forest. Nalini treats him well, and lives with the credo that husband is the ultimate god. She soon delivers a son named Raja. When Raja is around four years old, a snake appears, reminding Vijayan that he will die by the end of the day should his curse not be lifted.

Nalini learns about the curse and cure; she rushes with Raja to the cave with the Naga Jothi. Raja enters the cave to acquire the glass stone, but the Naga Jothi's light goes off, leaving him trapped. At Vijayan's suggestion, Nalini meets Nagarani and pleads for her husband and child. Nagarani refuses, Nalini curses her for selfishness and is imprisoned. She finds Singan's forgotten Naga Jothi, and escapes with it. En route, Nalini is troubled by Veerasenan who is killed by Singan. Nalini frees Raja.

Nalini and Raja reach home, and Raja breaks the glass stone, restoring Vijayan's appearance. Nalini's curse on Nagarani causes her to lose her beauty. She comes to apologise for her stubbornness and misbehaviour with Vijayan, who forgives her along with Nalini. Nalini blesses Nagarani, who regains her beauty. Soorasimmar invites Vijayan and Nalini to return to the palace, and they assent.

== Cast ==
Male cast

- R. Ganesh as Vijayan
- V. Nagayya as Soorasimmar
- M. N. Nambiar as Veerasenan
- Friend Ramasami as Singan
- Nat Annaji Rao as Karunakaran
- V. P. Balaraman as a sepoy

Female cast

- Anjali Devi as Nalini
- Lalitha as Nagarani
- M. N. Rajam as Mallika
- T. P. Muthulakshmi as Naagi
- Bala as Nagakanni
- Baby Uma as Raja

== Production ==
Kanavane Kankanda Deivam was directed by T. R. Raghunath, and produced by Pattanna and Narayana Iyengar under Narayanan Company. The story was written by K. V. Srinivasan, Umachandran and Sadasivabrahmam, while Srinivasan wrote the screenplay and Umachandran the dialogues. Cinematography was handled by B. S. Ranga. The producers initially rejected R. Ganesh (later known Gemini Ganesan) for the lead role of Vijayan because they believed he was too attractive to play a disfigured hunchback. Ganesh later disguised himself as a hunchbacked beggar and approached Iyengar, who mistook him for an actual beggar and offered him alms until Ganesh revealed his true identity. Impressed with his unorthodox auditioning, Iyengar cast Ganesh. For every day of filming, Ganesh's makeup took hours to apply and he could not eat until filming ended for the day.

The producers cast Anjali Devi as the princess Nalini after being impressed with her performance in Sorgavasal (1954). P. Bhanumathi was initially cast as the snake queen Nagarani after production began. She filmed many sequences, including the song "Unnai Kann Theduthey", but left in the middle of production. The role was later recast with Lalitha. Ganesh performed many stunts without the use of a stunt double. While the film was shot primarily in black-and-white at Vauhini, Revati and Narasu studios in Madras, the sequences in Gevacolor were shot at Mehboob Studio in Bombay. The final cut of the film was 174,446 feet (53,171 m).

== Soundtrack ==
The soundtrack composed by A. Rama Rao and Hemant Kumar. The hiccups in "Unnai Kann Theduthey" were not originally planned, but added through improvisation. The song was originally sung by P. Bhanumathi, but after her exit, it was resung by P. Susheela. However, Bhanumathi's hiccups in the original version were retained in the new version. The song was later sampled by G. V. Prakash Kumar in a song by the same name in Va (2010).

Song	Singer	Lyricist	Length
"Jaga Jothiyae"	P. Leela		06:15
"Kaashaayam Kattikittu"	???		04:53
"Enthan Ullam Thulli"	P. Susheela	Ku. Ma. Balasubramaniam	03:02
"Unnai Kann Theduthe"	P. Susheela	Ku. Ma. Balasubramaniam	03:45
"Amba Pethaikku Irangi"	P. Leela	Papanasam Sivan	02:49
"Kanavane Kann Kanda Deivam" (Amma Nee Kalankathe)	Ghantasala		04:58
"Anbil Malarntha Nal Roja"	P. Susheela	Ku. Ma. Balasubramaniam	03:25
"Oh Madha Vantharul"	P. Susheela		03:42
"Vazhvinil Valam"			02:02
"Intha Veenkobam"	P. Susheela & P. Leela		03:22

== Release and reception ==
Kanavane Kankanda Deivam was released on 6 May 1955, and received positive reviews. Kalki appreciated the film for the cast performances (particularly Ganesh and Anjali Devi), the audio recording and the cinematography. It became a commercial success, running for over 100 days in many theatres. The film was later remade in Hindi as Devta (1956), where Ganesh and Anjali reprised their roles.

== Bibliography ==
- Dhananjayan, G. (2011). The Best of Tamil Cinema, 1931 to 2010: 1931–1976. Galatta Media. OCLC 733724281.
- Ganesh, Narayani (2011). Eternal Romantic: My Father, Gemini Ganesan. New Delhi: Lustre Press. ISBN 978-81-7436-578-1.
