= Kannin Manigal =

- Theatrical release poster
- Directed by: T. Janakiraman
- Screenplay by: O. Ganapathyappan
- Story by: T. Janakiraman
- Produced by: T. Janakiraman
- Starring: M. K. Radha; Padmini; Sundar; N. S. Krishnan; T. A. Mathuram
- Cinematography: T. Janakiram
- Edited by: B. N. Rao
- Music by: S. V. Venkatraman
- Production company: Maheswari Pictures
- Distributed by: Jaya Pictures
- Release date: 5 May 1956
- Running time: 161 minutes
- Country: India
- Language: Tamil

Kannin Manigal (transl. Dearest Children [or] Eye Sight) is a 1956 Indian Tamil-language drama film produced and directed by T. Janakiraman. The film stars M. K. Radha and Padmini.

== Cast ==
The details are adapted from the database of Film News Anandan.

Male cast

- M. K. Radha
- N. S. Krishnan
- Sundar
- A. Karunanidhi

Female cast

- Padmini
- M. V. Rajamma
- T. A. Mathuram
- T. P. Muthulakshmi

== Production ==
Kannin Manigal was produced, written and directed by T. Janakiraman. The dialogues were by A. L. Narayanan and O. Ganapathyappan. Cinematography was handled by T. Janakiraman, and the editing by B. N. Rao. A. P. Chellaiah, D. Sohanlal and S. V. Gopal Rao were in charge of art direction, choreography and photography, respectively. The film, mainly in black-and-white, had some sequences in Gevacolor.

== Soundtrack ==
Music was composed by S. V. Venkatraman while the lyrics were penned by Papanasam Sivan, Kambadasan, Subbu. Arumugam, A. Maruthakasi and Kavimani Desigavinayagam Pillai. The song "Kaalam Maari Poche" (sung by N. S. Krishnan) was a satire on modern life and lifestyles, and attained popularity.

Song	Singer/s	Lyricist	Duration (m:ss)
"Maheswari Undhan"	N. L. Ganasaraswathi	Papanasam Sivan	
"Vinaiyo Nin Sodhanaiyo"	N. L. Ganasaraswathi	Papanasam Sivan	
"Nayagar Padshamadi"	N. L. Ganasaraswathi	Mayuram Vedanayagam Pillai	
"Adhaiyum Idhaiyum"	Kasthoori	A. Maruthakasi	
"Kuthaalathula Kuriyirukkira"	Kasthoori	A. Maruthakasi	
"Appadiyum Ippadiyum"	Sundaramma	A. Maruthakasi	
"Edhukkum Rendu Thaevai"	Kasthoori, Saroja & Sundaramma	A. Maruthakasi	
"Kaalam Maari Poche"	N. S. Krishnan	Subbu. Arumugam	02:37
"Nalla Veenai Idhe Mannile"	M. L. Vasanthakumari	Kambadasan	
"Velli Nilavinile"	M. L. Vasanthakumari	Kambadasan	
"Aaraaro Aasai Kanmaniye"	M. L. Vasanthakumari	Kambadasan	
"Anbin Dheepamidhe"	M. L. Vasanthakumari	Kambadasan	
"Manidhiramo Maayamo"	Saroja	Kambadasan	
"Kaadhal...Kandukonden Naane"	T. A. Mothi & R. Balasaraswathi	Kambadasan	
"Kaadhal...Kandukonden Naane" (Pathos)	T. A. Mothi & R. Balasaraswathi	Kambadasan	
"Yaen Marandhaai Eesaa"	S. V. Venkatraman	Kambadasan	

== Release and reception ==
Kannin Manigal was released on 5 May 1956, by Jaya Pictures. The film was not a box office success, and no print of it is known to survive. This makes it a lost film.
