= Devta (1956 film) =

- Directed by: Pattana
- Written by: Dialogue: Pandit Mukhram Sharma
- Screenplay by: Pattana
- Story by: Sadasiva Bramham
- Produced by: Narayanan Iyengar
- Starring: Gemini Ganeshan; Anjali Devi; Vyjayanthimala
- Music by: C. Ramchandra
- Production company: Narayanan Company Production
- Distributed by: Rajshri Productions
- Release date: 1956
- Running time: 178 minutes
- Country: India
- Language: Hindi

Devta is a 1956 Hindi partly coloured swashbuckler film written by Sadasiva Bramham and directed by Pattana. The film stars Vyjayanthimala in the title role, along with Gemini Ganeshan and Anjali Devi in the lead, while Agha, Bipin Gupta, Krishna Kumari and M. N. Nambiar form an ensemble cast. The film was produced by Narayanan Iyengar with his production company; Narayanan Company. The music was composed by C. Ramchandra, with lyrics provided by Rajendra Krishan. The film was a remake of the 1955 Tamil film Kanavane Kankanda Deivam, with Ganeshan, Devi, and Nambiar reprising their roles.

== Plot ==
This film narrated the story of a king (Bipin Gupta) who loses his sight and needs a "Nagi Jyothi" (serpent light) found in "Sarpaloka" (serpent world). A young man Vijay (Gemini Ganeshan) working in the palace and in love with the princess (Anjali Devi) undertakes the hazardous journey of going to the netherworld and getting the magic light from the hood of a snake in the custody of the serpent queen (Vyjayanthimala). The queen is attracted to the young man, who pretends to be in love with her mainly to get the light. He succeeds in getting it and the queen curses him to become an ugly man. The princess marries the prince, but they are banished and live in a hut. Soon a boy is born. The devoted wife faces many trials and tribulations before she and her son help her husband regain his original form. And they live happily thereafter.

== Cast ==
- Gemini Ganeshan as Vijay
- Anjali Devi as Nalini
- Vyjayanthimala as Naag Rani
- Bipin Gupta as Sangram Singh
- M. N. Nambiar as Veersen
- Agha as Bahadur
- Daisy Irani as Raja
- Kumari Kamala as Naag Kanya
- Krishnakumari as Naagi
- Indira as Mallika
- Kamalkrishna as Balveer
- V. P. Balaram as The soldier
- K. Ramaswamy as The soldier

== Themes and influences ==
Along with Shirdi Ke Sai Baba and Ajooba (1991), this film shows disabled people being cured through magic or divine intervention.

== Soundtrack ==
C. Ramchandra composed the soundtrack of the film, while the lyrics were penned by Rajendra Krishan. Singers Lata Mangeshkar, Asha Bhosle, Talat Mahmood and Manna Dey lent their voices. It was also one of the last collaborations of C. Ramchandra and Lata Mangeshkar, they fell out in 1958 and parted their ways.

Song	Singer	Raga
"Zalim Tere Aankhon Ne"	Lata Mangeshkar	
"Soona Hai Mere Dil Ka"	Lata Mangeshkar	
"Kaise Aaun Jamuna Ke"	Lata Mangeshkar	Bhairavi
"Do Nainon Ka Bana Jhulna"	Lata Mangeshkar	
"Ae Chand Kal Jo Aana"	Lata Mangeshkar	
"Kisi Se Pyar Hai Humko, Magar Hum Na Batayenge"	Lata Mangeshkar, Talat Mahmood	
"Phoolon Ke Mele"	Asha Bhosle	
"Udhar Chali Ja Janki"	Manna Dey	
