= Pillalu Techina Challani Rajyam =

1960 film by B. R. Panthulu

- Telugu version poster
- Directed by: B. R. Panthulu
- Screenplay by: Dadha Mirasee
- Dialogues by: D. V. Narasa Raju (Telugu); Vindhan (Tamil); Dada Mirasi (Kannada)
- Produced by: B. R. Panthulu (Kannada)
- Starring: B. R. Panthulu; M. V. Rajamma
- Cinematography: W. R. Subba Rao
- Edited by: R. Devarajan
- Music by: T. G. Lingappa
- Production companies: Padmini Pictures; M V R Productions (Kannada)
- Release dates: 1 July 1960 (Telugu); 29 July 1960 (Tamil/Kannada)
- Country: India
- Languages: Telugu; Tamil; Kannada

Pillalu Thechina Challani Rajyam is a 1960 Indian Telugu-language film directed by B. R. Panthulu. The film stars Panthulu, M. V. Rajamma, and Valluri Balakrishna. It was simultaneously made in Tamil as Kuzhandhaigal Kanda Kudiyarasu (transl. Republic of children) and in Kannada as Makkala Rajya ( transl. Kingdom of children). Narasimharaju and Balakrishna play pivotal roles in the Kannada version while Javar Seetharaman and K. Sarangapani play supportive roles in the Tamil version. This film was partly coloured by Gevacolor and processed at the Film Centre, Mumbai. It marked Umesh's film debut.

== Plot ==
A scientist takes children to an unknown planet, where they establish a democratic republic.

== Cast ==
Theatrical release poster in Tamil

DVD cover of Kannada version

Male cast

- B. R. Panthulu
- Mani Iyer
- Master Venkatesh
- Sivaji Ganesan as Scientist (guest role)

Female cast

- M. V. Rajamma
- Kanchana
- Baby Lakshmi

=== Telugu version ===
Male cast

- Rajanala
- Ramana Reddy
- Balakrishna
- Mikkilineni
- A. V. Subbarao
- Master Gopi
- Satyam
- D. R. Reddy
- M. S. Rao
- Karuppiah
- Anjaneyulu
- Lakshmaiah Chowdary
- Chidatala Appa Rao (uncredited)

Female cast

- Susheela
- Lakshmi
- Baby Suma
- Baby Vimala
- Saraswathamma
- Jhansi (uncredited)

=== Tamil version ===
Male cast

- Javar Seetharaman as King
- K. Sarangapani
- V. R. Rajagopal
- Sethupathi
- P. S. Venkatachalam
- Master Gopi
- Ramkumar
- Srinivasa Rao

Female cast

- Lakshmi Rajyam
- Bharathi
- Baby Chithra
- Baby Sarala

=== Kannada version ===
Male cast

- Dikki Madhava Rao
- Narasimharaju
- Balakrishna
- B. Hanumanthachar
- Veerabhadrappa
- Subbanna
- Master Umesh
- Shivaji Rao
- Srinivasa Rao
- Narayana Rao
- Chi. Udaya Shankar
- Maheswaraiah
- Sundru

Female cast

- M. N. Lakshmi Devi
- Indiradevi
- Papamma
- Baby Chandrakalavati
- Baby Vimala

== Soundtrack ==
Music by T. G. Lingappa for all languages. All the tunes for all the songs for the Telugu, Tamil and Kannada languages are the same.

Telugu Songs

Lyrics were written by were written by Samudrala Sr. and Kosaraju.

Song	Singers	Length
"Pillalu Techina Challani Rajyam" 1	L. R. Eswari & M. S. Padma	02:10
"Naguva Chilikumaa"	S. Janaki	03:31
"Aashala Uyyala Oogema"	Jikki & A. P. Komala	03:01
"Amma Kaanajaalavaa"	P. Susheela	03:25
"Ninnu Choochi Choochi Veedichipoduna"	P. B. Sreenivas & K. Rani	02:35
"Sundara Nanda Kishora"	S. Janaki & A. P. Komala	03:30
	K. Jamuna Rani	
"Chitti Cheemalu Pettina Puttalona"	P. B. Sreenivas	
	Seerkazhi Govindarajan	
"Tolgenu Neda"	L. R. Eswari & M. S. Padma	02:54

Tamil Songs

Lyrics were written by Ku. Ma. Balasubramaniam.

Song	Singer/s	Length
"Kuzhandhaigal Kanda Kudiyarasu"	L. R. Eswari & M. S. Padma	02:10
"Sirikka Theriyumaa"	S. Janaki	03:31
"Aasaiyin Oonjalil Aadiduvom"	Jikki & A. P. Komala	03:01
"Ammaa Vedhanai ... Amudhe Odi Vaa"	P. Susheela	03:25
"Unnai Kandu Roja Chendu"	Thiruchi Loganathan & K. Rani	02:35
"Azhagiya Thaamarai Kannaa"	S. Janaki & A. P. Komala	03:30
"Jaadhagam Silarukku Saadhagam"	Thiruchi Loganathan	02:34
"Chittu Chittu Nee"	K. Jamuna Rani	
"Sitterumbu Putrinile"	P. B. Sreenivas	
"Virunthaagum Isai Amudham"	Seerkazhi Govindarajan	03:15
"Mudindhathu Indru Mudiyarasu"	L. R. Eswari & M. S. Padma	02:10

Kannada Songs

Lyrics were written by Kanagal Prabhakar Shastry and C. Sadashivaiah.

Song	Singer/s	Lyrics	Length
"Makkala Rajya Premada Rajya"	Renuka	Kanagal Prabhakar Shastry	02:10
"Nagalu Barado"	S. Janaki	Kanagal Prabhakar Shastry	03:26
"Aaduva Aaseya"	Jikki & A. P. Komala	Kanagal Prabhakar Shastry	03:27
"Maleye Suridu Baa"	P. Susheela	Kanagal Prabhakar Shastry	02:29
"Ninna Nodi Manasu Koodi"		Kanagal Prabhakar Shastry	
"Jaya Jaya Gokula Baala"	S. Janaki & A. P. Komala	Kanagal Prabhakar Shastry	03:33
"Jathaka Balave Balavayya"		C. Sadashivaiah	02:34
	K. Jamuna Rani		
"Saaku Ee Jamba"		Kanagal Prabhakar Shastry	
"Madhupana Gaanasudha"	Seerkazhi Govindarajan		03:15
"Makkala Rajya Premada Rajya"	Renuka	Kanagal Prabhakar Shastry	02:10

== Reception ==
In a 2013 retrospective review, Dr. Vyjayanthi of Sakshi praised the performances of the child actors and stated that the film is a good effort and such films should come again and again but they do not come.
