= Kiratha Arjuna =

- Poster
- Directed by: G. Rameshwaran; Murugadasa
- Starring: M. R. Krishnamurthi; Thirukharaivaasal Subbulakshmi; Bhavani K. Sambamurthi; T. M. Ramasami Pillai
- Cinematography: G. Singh; Devji
- Music by: Bhavani K. Sambamurthi
- Production company: Venus Pictures
- Release date: 25 May 1940
- Country: India
- Language: Tamil

Kiratha Arjuna (also known as Oorvasi Saahasam) is a 1940 Indian Tamil-language Hindu mythological film directed by G. Rameshwaran and Murugadasa, and produced by Venus Pictures. Based on the war between the Pandava prince Arjuna and the god Shiva, the film stars M. R. Krishnamurthi, Thirukharaivaasal Subbulakshmi, Bhavani K. Sambamurthi and T. M. Ramasami Pillai. It was released on 25 May 1940. No print of the film is known to survive, making it a lost film.

== Cast ==
- M. R. Krishnamurthi as Arjuna
- Thirukharaivaasal Subbulakshmi as Urvashi
- Bhavani K. Sambamurthi as Narada
- T. M. Ramasami Pillai as Shiva

== Production ==
Kiratha Arjuna had an alternate title: Oorvasi Saahasam. It was directed by G. Rameshwaran and Murugadasa, and produced by Venus Pictures. (Note: Not the later studio of the same name.) Bhavani K. Sambamurthi, who portrayed Narada, also composed the film's music, while Papanasam Sivan wrote the lyrics. Cinematography was handled by G. Singh and Devji. The final length of the film was 14,000 feet (4,300 m).

== Release and reception ==
The film was censored in 1939, but released only on 25 May 1940. No print of the film is known to survive, making it a lost film.
