= Vanangamudi =

- Theatrical release poster
- Directed by: P. Pullayya
- Screenplay by: P. Pullayya
- Story by: A. K. Velan
- Produced by: M. Somasundaram
- Starring: Sivaji Ganesan; Savitri
- Cinematography: P. Ramasamy
- Edited by: K. Govindasamy
- Music by: G. Ramanathan
- Production companies: Saravanabhava & Unity Pictures
- Release date: 12 April 1957
- Running time: 170 minutes
- Country: India
- Language: Tamil

Vanagamudi (transl. The Independent) is a 1957 Indian Tamil-language film starring Sivaji Ganesan and Savitri. Written and directed by P. Pullayya, the film was released on 12 April 1957, and emerged as a box office hit.

== Cast ==
Male cast

- Sivaji Ganesan as Architect Chitrasenan
- M. K. Radha as King
- V. Nagayya as Sevappan
- M. N. Nambiar as Narendran
- K. A. Thangavelu as Paranjothi

Male support cast

- M. R. Santhanam, Nat Annaji Rao,
  Thangappan and Gemini Balu.

Female cast

- Savitri as Devasundari
- Kannamba as Mangalam
- Rajasulochana as Ambika
- M. Saroja as Neelaveni

Dance

- Helen

== Soundtrack ==
The music was composed by G. Ramanathan, with the lyrics written by Thanjai N. Ramaiah Dass. The song "Ennai Pol Penn" is set in Todi raga, and "Vaa Vaa Valarmathiye" in Suddhadhanyasi.

Song	Singers	Length
"Rajayogame"	P. Susheela	02:51
"Malaiye Un Nilaiye"	Seerkazhi Govindarajan	03:00
"Paattum Baradhamum"	T. M. Soundararajan	02:48
"Ennai Pol Pennallavo"	P. Susheela	03:06
"Siramathil Thigazhvadhu...Vaa Vaa Vaa Valarmadhiye Vaa"	M. L. Vasanthakumari	04:23
"Kattazhagu Mama"	P. Leela	04:06
"Mogana Punnagai"	T. M. Soundararajan & P. Susheela	03:20
"Aatchiyin"	Seerkazhi Govindarajan	03:14
"Kuthu Kummangu Koyyaa"	Jikki	03:18
"Vaazhvinile Vaazhvinile"	A. M. Rajah & P. Suseela	03:04
"Eeraindhu Maadhame"	T. M. Soundararajan	02:03
	S. C. Krishnan & T. V. Rathnam	

== Release and reception ==
Vanangamudi was released on 12 April 1957. During the time of its release, Mohan Arts handcrafted an 80 feet (24 m) cutout which was kept at the Chennai-based Chitra theatre. According to Mohan Arts founder K. Mohan's son Harinath, it was the tallest standee made in the whole of Asia at that time. On 19 April 1957, The Indian Express positively reviewed the film, particularly Ganesan's performance. On 28 April, Kanthan of Kalki appreciated the story and dialogues by Velan. The film emerged a commercial success.
