= Sathi Murali =

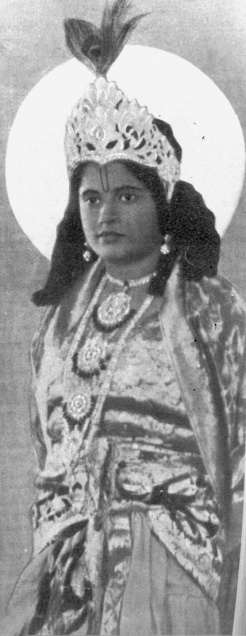
- A still
- Directed by: B. N. Rao, T. C. Vadivelu Naicker
- Written by: T. C. Vadivelu Naicker
- Story by: Naicker
- Produced by: Central Studios
- Starring: M. K. Radha, M. R. Santhanalakshmi
- Release date: 1941
- Country: India
- Language: Tamil

Sathi Murali was a 1941 Tamil-language film directed by Vadivelu Naicker. It starred M. K. Radha, M. R. Santhanalakshmi and T. R. Mahalingam. No print of the film is known to survive, making it a lost film.

== Production ==
During the late 1930s and the 1940s, there were a lot of movies with social messages such as Thyagabhoomi. Sathi Murali targeted caste-based discrimination in society. Sathi Murali was the second film for singer and actor T. R. Mahalingam who later became one of the leading stars of Tamil cinema.

== Plot ==
The movie was based on the story of a low-caste boy named Seenu who falls in love with a high-caste woman named Murali. After facing a lot of hardships, their love finally succeeds.

== Cast ==
- M. K. Radha as Seenu
- T. R. Mahalingam as Young Seenu
- M. R. Santhanalakshmi as Murali, Krishnan
- S. Varalakshmi as Young Murali
- Nagercoil Mahadevan as Naradar
- P. G. Venkatesan as Sadhu
- T. A. Mathuram as Sathyabhama
- L. Narayana Rao
- Kali N. Rathnam
- P. S. Gnanam
- Buffoon Sankara Iyer
- Joker Ramudu
