= Ambikapathy (1957 film) =

- Theatrical release poster
- Directed by: P. Neelakantan
- Written by: P. Neelakantan
- Screenplay by: Sakthi T. K. Krishnasamy; Chinna Annamalai; M. Lakshmanan
- Produced by: V. Arunachalam
- Starring: Sivaji Ganesan; P. Bhanumathi
- Cinematography: V. Ramamoorthy (black and white); W. R. Subba Rao (Gevacolor)
- Edited by: R. Devarajan
- Music by: G. Ramanathan
- Production company: ALS Productions
- Release date: 22 October 1957
- Running time: 149 minutes
- Country: India
- Language: Tamil

Ambikapathy (also spelled Ambikapathi) is a 1957 Indian Tamil language film directed by P. Neelakantan, starring Sivaji Ganesan and P. Bhanumathi. The film, primarily in black-and-white, had sequences in Gevacolor. It was released on 22 October 1957.

== Plot ==
Kambar is a poet in Kulothunga's court in Urayur. Despite his erudite scholarship, deep learning of Sanskrit and Tamil and extraordinary poetic skills, Kamban remains a humble, unassuming, deeply pious man, and a loyal subject of the King. All this earns Kamban a special place in the heart of Kulothunga who treats him with utmost deference and affection. Ottakoothar is another great poet in the King's court, and Kamban's ascent in the firmament and the King's unabashed admiration for Kamban's poetry has Ottakoothar simmering in jealousy.

It is in this backdrop that the love story blossoms. Amaravathi, the beautiful princess and Ambikapathy, the handsome and talented son of Kambar, fall in love. Ambikapathy is a bold, assertive and supremely self-confident youth, who even at that age, exhibits poetic skills equal to that of his illustrious father. Ottakoothar is doubly dismayed when he hears of this affair, for he had planned to bring about the marriage of Amaravathi with his stooge, Prince Kulasekharan of Vengi. With a brilliant, cunning mind at work, Ottakoothar sets about poisoning the King's mind against Ambikapathi and contrives to bring about various situations wherein Ambikapathi might fall to disgrace. Luck seems to be on Ambikapathi's side as he comes unscathed through these traps.

However, when Kamban discovers his son's love for the princess and realizes the gruesome retribution that would undoubtedly follow, he pleads with Ambikapathi to give up his love. Meanwhile, Ottakoothar gets possession of a verse that Ambikapathi had penned as an ode to Amaravathi's beauty and loses no time to showing the parchment to the King. The King is shaken by this clinching evidence of the love affair, and is determined to put it to an end. However, wishing to avoid any unwanted publicity and not willing to take any drastic measures, at the suggestion of Kamban, the King orders Ambikapathi to go to the distant Pushpaga Theevu, apparently to propagate the greatness of Tamil. A storm leads to the ship in which Ambikapathy is traveling being wrecked; and hanging on to a log, Ambikapathi is washed ashore in Shenbaga Theevu. Coming to know of the developments in Uraiyur, Ambikapathy hastens in disguise thereto.

With the help of Kannamma, the daughter of Pugazhendhi Pulavar, he succeeds in meeting Amaravathi, and they plan to flee to Shenbaga Theevu that night. But their plans go awry and both are caught trying to leave the palace. The King sentences Ambikapathy to death. But Amaravathi intervenes, claiming equal responsibility for whatever may have been the crime that Ambikapathi is said to have committed. In the ensuing argument, the King condemns Ambikapathi as sham poet who could write only verses that cater to man's baser instincts. Ambikapathy is outraged at this slur on his poetic capabilities. The upshot is that if Ambikapathi could sing 100 devotional songs in succession, the King promises him Amaravathi's hand in marriage. If he failed in this challenge, he would be executed forthwith. Amaravathi visits Ambikapathi in prison that night and urges caution. Ambikapathi laughs away her fears, assuring her that he is wholly confident of his own capabilities. A relieved Amaravathi says that she would be counting the songs, and would appear before him at the end of the ordeal.

The court assembles next day at the vasantha madapam, and in the august presence of the King, ministers and scholars, Ambikapathy commences his soiree with a short invocation to Saraswathi, the Goddess of learning. Amaravathi mistakenly counts this as one of the hundred songs, and so at the end of the 99th song, she appears happily in front of Ambikapathi to signal his victory. Overjoyed at sighting his beloved, and thinking that he has completed the hundred songs, Ambikapathy bursts into a verse in praise of Amaravathi's appearance. Rising with grim satisfaction, Ottakoothar points out that only 99 devotional songs had been sung, and hence Ambikapathy has lost the challenge. Kamban's anguish-filled plea for clemency falls on deaf ears, as the King orders the death sentence to be carried out. Ambikapathi is put to death, and the grief-stricken Amaravathi too dies and their souls unite in heaven.

== Cast ==
- Sivaji Ganesan as Ambikapathy
- P. Bhanumathi as Amaravathi
- M. K. Radha as Kambar
- V. Nagayya as King Kulothunga Chola I
- M. N. Nambiar as Ottakoothar
- Rajasulochana as Kannamma
- N. S. Krishnan as Kalaivanar Arjunan
- T. A. Madhuram as Alli (Rajakumari's Friend)
- K. A. Thangavelu as Prince Kulesekharan
- A. Karunanidhi as Vengayam
- K. D. Santhanam as Sadayappa Vallal

== Production ==
The story of Ambikapathy was first adapted into a 1937 film directed by Ellis R. Dungan. In 1957, A. L. Srinivasan decided to remake the story with P. Neelakantan as the director. He initially requested M. K. Thyagaraja Bhagavathar to play the role of Kambar but he refused, having played the role of Ambikapathi in the 1937 film. M. K. Radha was later cast as Kambar. This was N. S. Krishnan's final film; he died before the film's release and as a mark of gratitude the film was dedicated to him. Sequences for the songs "Maasilaa Nilavey", "Vaadaa Malare" and "Vaanam Inge" were shot in Gevacolor.

== Soundtrack ==
Soundtrack was composed by G. Ramanathan and lyrics for all songs were written by Thanjai N. Ramaiah Dass, Kannadasan, K. D. Santhanam, Ku. Sa. Krishnamoorthi, Ku. Ma. Balasubramaniam, Pattukkottai Kalyanasundaram and Aadhimoolam Gopalakrishnan. The song "Vadivelum Mayilum" is set in Kedaragaula raga. The song "Sindhanai Sei" is set in Kalyani raga. The song "Vaada Malare" is set in Mukhari raga. The song "Vaanam Inge" is based on Punnagavarali. The songs like "Sinthanai Sei Maname", "Aadattuma Konjam Paadattumaa", "Satrey Sarindha Kuzhaley", "Kannile Irupathenna", "Masila Nilave" and "Vaada Malare Thamizh Thene" were well received. On the song, "Vadivelum Mayilum", Charulatha Mani wrote, "the song 'Vadivelum Mayilum' has the Charanam alone ('Thamizh Maalai Thanai Sooduvaar') in Kambhoji raga. The phrase opens brightly at the upper Rishabha and the characteristic phrase 'PDSRGR' clearly establishes the raga beyond doubt". On the song "Sindhanai Sei", she wrote "G. Ramanathan showcases the key phrases of the raga. In the lines "Sentamizhkarul gnana desaganai", the embellishments free-wheeling from the tara sthayi gandhara are a treat". On the song "Vaada Malare", she wrote "In the line 'Muzhu Nilave', the swaras 'NDSRM' are neatly outlined in the madhyama sthayi, a highlight in the song". On the song "Vaanam Inge", she wrote "The refrain at the conclusion of the piece 'Ini Naanum Verillai', in the voices of Bhanumathi and T. M. Soundararajan, is a fitting finale".

- "Kanda Kanavu Indru Paliththathe" by N. L. Ganasaraswathi
- "Soru Manakkum Cho Naadaam" by V. N. Sundaram
- "Velga Nin Kotram Manna" by Seerkazhi Govindarajan
- "Varum Pagaivar Padai Kandu" by T. M. Soundararajan
- "Kottikkizhango Kizhango" by V. N. Sundaram
- "Ennarum Nalathinaal" by V. N. Sundaram
- "Kalaiyendraal Kalaiyum Aagum Kalaithalum Aagum" by N. S. Krishnan
- "Kanne Unnaal Naan Adaiyum Kavalai Konjama" by N. S. Krishnan & T. A. Madhuram
- "Aavi Udaigalai Naan Katti Vitten" by Seerkazhi Govindarajan
- "Andho Parithaabam" by C. S. Jayaraman
- "Kannithamizhagam Kandedutha Kaaviya Kalaiyadi" by L. R. Eswari
- "Aadattuma Konjam Paadattumaa" by P. Susheela
- "Ponaa Iyyanna Ikkanna Kaavanna Loona Kuthiraiyina" by Seerkazhi Govindarajan and V. T. Rajagopalan
- "Amaravathiye En Aasai Kaniyamudhe" by T. M. Soundararajan
- "Ambuliyai Kuzhambaakki Aravinda Rasamodu Amudhum Serththu" by T. M. Soundararajan
- "Itta Adi Nova Eduththa Adi Koppalikka" by T. M. Soundararajan
- "Kannile Iruppathenna Kanni Ilamaane" by T. M. Soundararajan (Lyrics by Kannadasan)
- "Aaya Kalaigal Arubathunaanginaiyum" by T. M. Soundararajan
- "Sindhanai Sei Maname" by T. M. Soundararajan (Lyrics by K. D. Santhanam)
- "Vadivelum Mayilum Thunai" by T. M. Soundararajan
- "Thamizh Maalai Thanai Sooduvaar" by T. M. Soundararajan
- "Satre Sarindha Kuzhal Asaiaya" by T. M. Soundararajan
- "Natrenozhuga Nadana Singara" by T. M. Soundararajan
- "Kannile Iruppathenna Kanniyila Mane" by P. Bhanumathi (Lyrics by Kannadasan)
- "Annalum Nokinaan, Avalum Nokkkinaal" by V. N. Sundaram
- "Maasila Nilave Nam Kaadhalil Magizhvodu" by T. M. Soundararajan & P. Bhanumathi
- "Chandira Sooriyar Pom Dhisai Maarinum" by N. S. Krishnan & T. A. Madhuram
- "Vaada Malare Thamizhthene" by T. M. Soundararajan & P. Bhanumathi

== Critical reception ==
Jambavan of Kalki noted numerous flaws in the film's direction and appreciated the songs but criticised the film's length, feeling it would have been better if ttimmed.
