= Thirumanam =

1958 film by A. Bhimsingh

- Theatrical release poster
- Directed by: A. Bhimsingh
- Written by: Valampuri Somanathan
- Produced by: Valampuri Somanathan
- Starring: Gemini Ganesan; Savitri
- Cinematography: G. Vittal Rao; C. F. Marconi
- Music by: S. M. Subbaiah Naidu; T. G. Lingappa
- Production company: Valampuri Pictures
- Distributed by: Palaniyappa Film Corporation
- Release date: 18 July 1958
- Country: India
- Language: Tamil

Thirumanam (transl. Marriage) is a 1958 Indian Tamil-language romance film directed by A. Bhimsingh, and produced and written by Valampuri Somanathan. The film stars Gemini Ganesan and Savitri. It revolves around a singer who does not sing for money, believing there is a curse upon him that if he did so, he would die.

Thirumanam is the first film produced by the studio Valampuri Pictures. While primarily black-and-white, it featured some dance sequence which were shot in Gevacolor. The film was released on 18 July 1958 and failed commercially. No print of the film is known to survive, making it a lost film.

== Plot ==
Brothers Chidambaram and Nataraj live in a village. They hail from a family of musicians. The brothers do not sing for money, since they believe there is a curse upon the family that if they sing for money, they would die. In the face of poverty Nataraj goes to Madras in search of a job. He stays in the bungalow of Damodharam, a friend of Chidambaram. Damodharam's daughter Vani falls in love with Nataraj. Damodharam, who learns about the financial difficulty faced by his friend through Nataraj, sends money to Chidambaram but Chidambaram returns the money as his policy is not to receive money from others without doing any work. Enraged, Vani tells Nataraj that people with so much self-respect should not have come to their house. Nataraj leaves the house. He saves a clerk from robbers. The clerk gives accommodation to Nataraj. Vani feels sorry for Nataraj and somehow finds his new place of stay.

Damodharam decides to have their marriage ceremony. Vani discovers that Nataraj can sing. She arranges for him to sing in a radio broadcast. Nataraj says about the curse but Vani brushes away that saying it is superstitious. Nataraj agrees with her and sings on the radio. He receives payment for his performance and sends money to his elder brother. In the meantime, Nataraj gives accommodation to another girl named Mullai in the house. Vani becomes suspicious and stops the marriage arrangements. When he learns that Nataraj sang for money, Chidambaram dies of shock. Upon learning of Chidambaram's death, Nataraj returns to the village. He becomes mentally unbalanced. Doctors say that he cannot be cured by medicine. Mullai decides that he can be cured only by bringing Vani. The rest of the story deals with what happens afterwards.

== Cast ==
Male cast

- Gemini Ganesan as Nataraj
- K. A. Thangavelu as Adambaram
- V. Nagayya as Chidambaram
- S. V. Ranga Rao as Damodharam
- N. Viswanathan as Sundar
- V. R. Rajagopal as Rajagopal
- Ashokan as Ashokan

Female cast

- Savitri as Vani
- M. N. Rajam as Mullai
- P. Hemalatha as Mangalam
- Sandhya as Sandhya
- M. S. S. Bhagyam as Bhagyam
- Baby Uma as Megalai
- Suryakantham as Kanthammal

Supporting cast

- K. M. Nambirajan
- Rama Rao
- Sharma
- Karikol Raju

Dance

- Gopi Krishna
- Kamala Lakshman
- B. Saroja Devi

== Production ==
Thirumanam was the inaugural production of the studio Valampuri Pictures. It was directed by A. Bhimsingh and written by Valampuri Somanathan, who also produced the film. Cinematography was handled by G. Vittal Rao and C. F. Marconi, and the art direction by P. P. Chowdhri. Photography was handled by Thirumalai, and the choreography by Vazhuvoor Ramaiah Pillai, Gopi Krishna, Thangaraju, and Thangappan. The film was processed at Bharani Studio. Although primarily black-and-white, the film featured some dance sequence which were shot in Gevacolor. The final length of the film was 16,771 feet (5,112 m).

== Soundtrack ==
The soundtrack was composed by S. M. Subbaiah Naidu and T. G. Lingappa while the lyrics were written by Thanjai N. Ramaiah Dass, Kannadasan, Subbu Arumugam, Suratha, Pattukkottai Kalyanasundaram and M. K. Athmanathan. There were two songs, one each written by poets Subramania Bharati and Ramalinga Swamigal. The song "Mangiyathor Nilavinile", based on Bharati's poem of the same name, is set in the Carnatic raga known as Desh, "Ennamellam Or Idathaye" is set in Sahana, and "Thanga Nilavil" is set in Abheri.

Song	Singer/s	Lyricist	Duration
"Aadiya Padam Mandradiya Padam"	M. M. Dandapani Desikar	Jothi Ramalinga Swamigal	03:10
"Thulli Vara Poren"	Sirkazhi Govindarajan, P. Susheela	Pattukkottai Kalyanasundaram	
"En Ennam Inipatheno"	Jikki	M. K. Athmanathan	03:10
"Kazhani Engum Sathiradum"	A. L. Raghavan, Jikki	Pattukkottai Kalyanasundaram	03:05
"Lavaa Lavaa...Vai Raja Vai"	Sirkazhi Govindarajan, Rathnamala	Thanjai Ramaiah Dass	
"Ennamellam Or Idathaye"	T. M. Soundararajan	Suradha	02:43
"Mangiyathor Nilavinile"	T. M. Soundararajan	Bharathiyar	03:19
"Thanga Nilavil"	A. M. Rajah, Jikki	Kavingnar Kannadasan	03:11
"Thirumanam...Naalum Paathaachu"	Jikki, A. P. Komala	Kavingnar Kannadasan	
"Inbam Yavume"	T. M. Soundararajan	Thanjai Ramaiah Dass	03:16
"Karunaikkadale Katpagatharuve"	M. M. Dandapani Desikar	Subbu Arumugam	
"Vaa, Oru Saedhi Sollave Odi Vaa"	Sirkazhi Govindarajan, P. Leela	Thanjai Ramaiah Dass	

== Release and reception ==
Thirumanam was released on 18 July 1958, by Palaniyappa Film Corporation. It was previously scheduled for Diwali 1957. On 25 July 1958, The Indian Express stated, "Thirumanam is a film that really holds the audience. [Bhimsingh's] direction has made the tale of a village family that falls on evil times owing to its faithfulness to tradition memorable." However, the film was not commercially successful. No print of the film is known to survive, making it a lost film.

== Bibliography ==
- Sundararaman (2007) [2005]. Raga Chintamani: A Guide to Carnatic Ragas Through Tamil Film Music (2nd ed.). Pichhamal Chintamani. OCLC 295034757.
