= Bhaktha Chetha =

1940 film by K. Subramanyam

- Directed by: K. Subrahmanyam
- Written by: K. Subrahmanyam (dialogues)
- Produced by: K. Subrahmanyam
- Starring: Papanasam Sivan; G. Subbulakshmi; Kothamangalam Subbu; S. R. Janaki; Master R. Thirumalai
- Cinematography: Kamal Ghosh
- Edited by: R. Rajagopal
- Music by: V. S. Parthasarathy Iyengar
- Production company: Madras United Artistes Corporation
- Release date: 14 January 1940
- Country: India
- Language: Tamil

Bhaktha Chetha (transl. Devotee Chetha) is a 1940 Tamil language film directed and produced by K. Subrahmanyam. The film featured Papanasam Sivan as the titular character with G. Subbulakshmi, Kothamangalam Subbu, S. R. Janaki and Master R. Thirumalai playing supporting roles.

== Plot ==
Chetha (Papanasam Sivan) is a cobbler of a lower caste and a devotee of Vishnu living in a slum situated near Hastinapura. Drona (Kothamangalam Subbu) believes that people like Chetha do not possess any right to worship God and treats Chetha in a humiliating manner. An unexpected turn of events occurs when Chetha's son, Seva (Master R. Thirumalai), falls in love with Drona's daughter, Shantha (G. Subbulakshmi), who reciprocates his feelings. Chetha is shocked to learn of their love, but accepts it when he realises that God does not consider any distinction between caste and creed. However, Drona, on learning of Seva's love, becomes livid and immediately orders Chetha to make one thousand pairs of Sandals before daybreak, and that he will be beheaded in public if he fails to accomplish the task. Chetha starts making the sandals. After a point, he becomes completely exhausted and closes his eyes to rest. When he opens them however, he is surprised to find out that the one thousand pairs are ready. He realises that it is God's work. Seeing the task completed, Drona too realises the devotion of Chetha to Vishnu and happily accepts the marriage of Seva and Shantha.

== Cast ==
Adapted from The Hindu

- Papanasam Sivan as Chetha
- G. Subbulakshmi as Shantha
- Kothamangalam Subbu as Drona
- S. R. Janaki
- Master R. Thirumalai as Seva

== Production ==
Bhaktha Chetha marked the acting debut of G. Subbulakshmi & Master R. Thirumalai (the one and only film he did). K. Subrahmanyam directed and produced the film under his own banner Madras United Artistes Corporation. The dialogues were written by Subrahmanyam himself. For the film, a life-size cut-out of Subbulakshmi dressed in an expensive silk sari was installed in a hoarding site opposite Dr. Ambedkar Government Law College, Chennai. The saris were changed every week. According to film critic and historian Randor Guy, this was the first and last time such a promotional technique had been done for a Tamil film in Chennai.

== Soundtrack ==
V. S. Parthasarathy Iyengar composed the film's music and score while Papanasam Sivan wrote the lyrics for the songs. One of the songs sung by Subbulakshmi, "Kanden Kanden" became popular.

== Reception ==
Bhaktha Chetha was a success at the box office. Guy notes that the film is "remembered for the new heroine Subbulakshmi and the daring theme." The film was remade in Telugu as Jeevana Mukthi (1942). The remake was a flop.
