= Illarame Nallaram =

1958 film by P. Pullaiah

- Theatrical release poster
- Directed by: P. Pullayya
- Written by: K. V. Srinivasan
- Produced by: Narayana Aiyangar
- Starring: Gemini Ganesan; Anjali Devi
- Cinematography: Kamal Ghosh
- Edited by: S. R. Chandrasekaran
- Music by: K. G. Moorthy
- Production company: Narayanan Company
- Release date: 1 August 1958
- Country: India
- Language: Tamil

Illarame Nallaram (transl. Household is fine) is a 1958 Indian Tamil-language drama film directed by P. Pullayya. The film stars Gemini Ganesan and Anjali Devi. It was released on 1 August 1958.

== Cast ==
Male cast

- Gemini Ganesan as Venugopal
- V. Nagayya as Selvaraj
- M. N. Nambiar as Gopu
- C. R. Parthiban
- V. R. Rajagopal as Mannar
- V. M. Ezhumalai
- M. R. Santhanam
- Anantharaman
- Master Murali

Female cast

- Anjali Devi as Lakshmi
- M. V. Rajamma as Malathi
- B. Saroja Devi as Sarala
- P. S. Gnanam
- K. Sooryakala
- Rajeswari

Dance

- Kumari Kamala

== Production ==
B. Saroja Devi was introduced to Tamil cinema with this film. She was featured in a minor role as dancer Sarala. This film had a dance sequence of Kumari Kamala in colour.

== Soundtrack ==
Music was composed by K. G. Moorthy while the lyrics were penned by A. Maruthakasi, P. Hanumandha Rao, Ku. Ma. Balasubramaniam and K. V. Srinivasan.

Song	Singer/s	Length
"Anaiyaatha Anbenum"	T. M. Soundararajan	03:39
"Ninaikkum Pothe"	A. M. Rajah & P. Susheela	03:19
"Ennai Aalavantha Raja"	Jikki	03:14
"Mainor Life Rompa"	A. M. Rajah	02:43
"Nilave Avan Yaar Theriyuma"	S. Janaki	03:18
"Paadadha Kuyilaanen"	P. Susheela	03:17
"Aasai Mozhi Pesum Ivar Yaaradi"	P. Susheela	03:33
"Maname Unadhaaval Yaavum Kanavo Nanavo"	P. Susheela	03:29
"Jaani Nee Vaa Vaa"	A. L. Raghavan & S. Janaki	03:41
"Marane Un Malarkanai"	P. Susheela, S. Janaki & P. B. Srinivas	09:02
