= M. K. Radha =

Indian actor

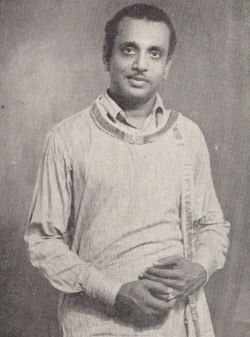
- M. K. Radha in the late 1940s
- Born: Madras Kandaswami Radhakrishnan; 20 November 1910; Madras, Madras Presidency, British India
- Died: 29 August 1985 (aged 74); Madras, Tamil Nadu, India
- Occupation: Actor
- Years active: 1936–1958

Madras Kandaswami Radhakrishnan (20 November 1910 – 29 August 1985), professionally known as M. K. Radha, was an Indian actor and singer who worked mainly in Tamil cinema.

== Early life ==
He was born in Chennai and took up acting in Tamil stage at the age of 7. He was tutored by his father Kandasamy Mudaliar, a famous drama teacher at that time.

== Career ==
His career spanned almost 25 years in Tamil drama as a lead actor during India's pre-independence days and he was a popular social hero in various patriotic dramas. His film career spanned between 1936 and 1958. Radha was a benefactor of M.G. Ramachandran (MGR), and in his autobiography, Naan Yaen Piranthaen, MGR had written effusively about how Radha had helped him, while he was a struggling movie actor in the late 1930s.

== As a singer ==
He sang in a few films during the 1940s. Songs from the film Kannamma En Kadhali became popular.

== Filmography ==
Year	Title	Role	Language	Notes
1936	Sathi Leelavathi	Krishnamurthy	Tamil	
1936	Chandramohana or Samooga Thondu	Chandra Mohan	Tamil	
1938	Anaadhai Penn		Tamil	
1939	Maya Machhindra	Machindran	Tamil	
1940	Sathi Murali	Seenu	Tamil	
1941	Prema Bandhan	Ananthu	Tamil	
1941	Rajagopichand		Tamil	
1941	Vana Mohini	Prince	Tamil	
1944	Dasi Aparanji	Vikramadithan	Tamil	
1945	Kannamma En Kadhali	Muthu	Tamil	Sang 3 songs
1948	Chandralekha	Veersingh	Hindi	
1948	Chandralekha	Veerasimhan	Tamil	
1948	Gnana Soundari	Pilendran	Tamil	
1949	Apoorva Sagodharargal	Vijayasimhan, Vikramasimhan	Tamil	Double Role
1950	Apoorva Sahodarulu	Vijayasimhan, Vikramasimhan	Telugu	Double Role
1951	Saudamini		Tamil	
1951	Samsaram	Gopu	Tamil	
1951	Sansar	Narayan	Hindi	
1952	Moondru Pillaigal	Muthu	Tamil	
1952	Mugguru Kodukulu	Prakasam	Telugu	
1953	Avvaiyar	King Pari	Tamil	
1954	Nallakalam		Tamil	
1954	Bahut Din Huwe	King	Hindi	
1955	Gruhalakshmi		Tamil	
1955	Porter Kandan	Kandhan	Tamil	
1956	Kannin Manigal	Inspector	Tamil	
1956	Paasavalai	King	Tamil	
1957	Ambikapathy	Kambar	Tamil	
1957	Karpukkarasi	King	Tamil	
1957	Pudhaiyal	Kumaravadivu	Tamil	
1957	Neelamalai Thirudan	Thangappan	Tamil	
1957	Vanangamudi	King	Tamil	
1957	Anbe Deivam		Tamil	
1958	Uthama Puthiran	King	Tamil	

== Personal life ==
Radha was married to M. R. Gnanambal, also an actress.

== Awards and honours ==
In 1973, he received the Padma Shri Award for his contribution to performing arts from President V.V. Giri.

In July 2004, the Indian Postal Service special postal envelope in his memory.

A neighbourhood in Teynampet, Chennai is named M.K. Radha Nagar in his honour.
