= M. S. Viswanathan discography =

The following is a discography of the Indian musician M. S. Viswanathan (1928–2015). Viswanathan composed scores for films in Tamil, Malayalam, Telugu and Kannada.

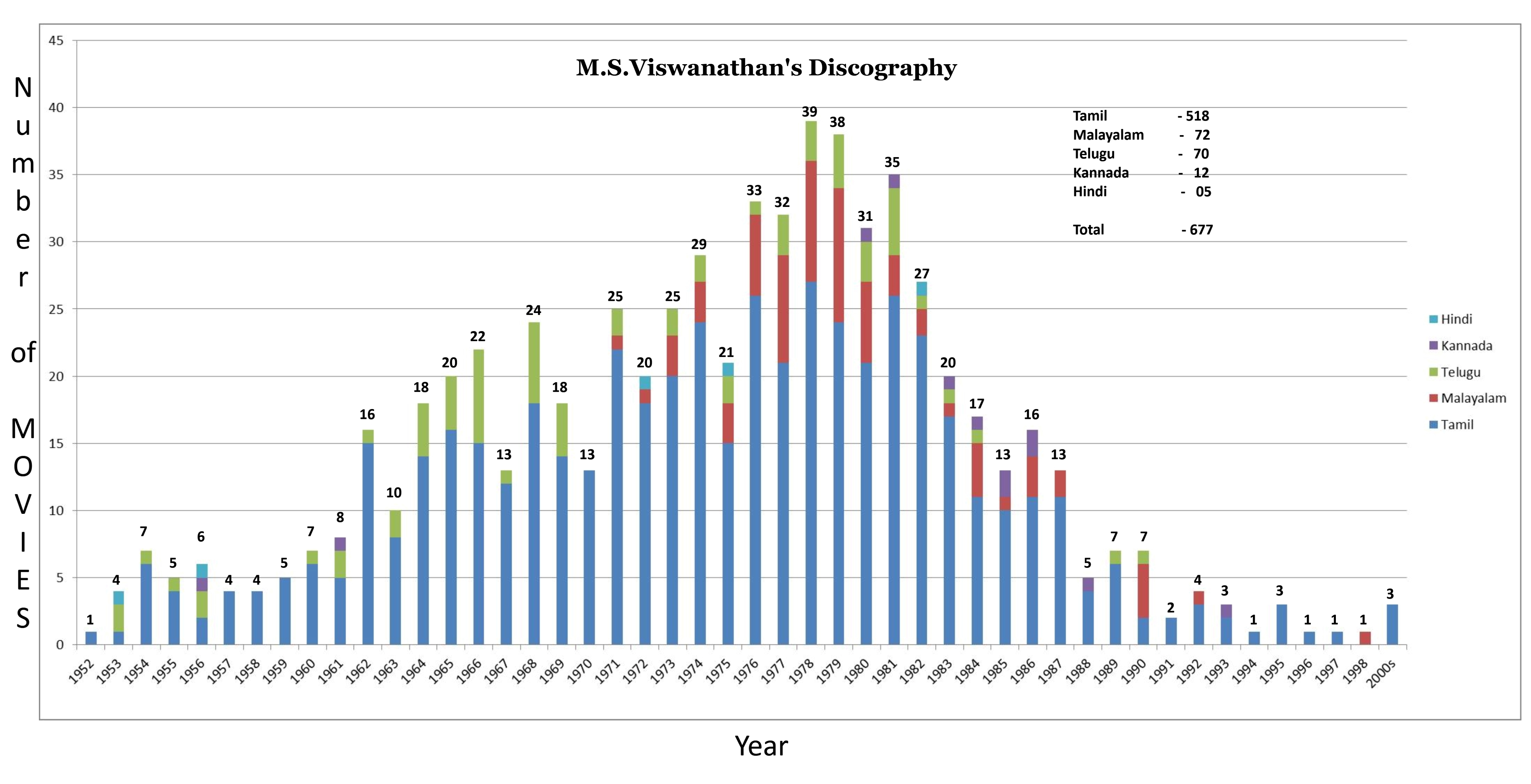
A Graphical Representation of M.S.Viswanathan's Discography Over the Years with Colors to Represent Different Languages.

== Tamil films ==
=== 1950s ===
| Year | Film name | Notes |
|---|---|---|
| 1952 | Panam | Composed along with T. K. Ramamoorthy |
| 1953 | Ammalakkalu | Co-Music by C. R. Subbaraman; Composed along with T. K. Ramamoorthy (Background Score) |
| 1953 | Marumagal | Co-Music by C. R. Subbaraman, G. Ramanathan; Composed along with T. K. Ramamoorthy (Background Score) |
| 1953 | Genova | Composed along with M. S. Gnanamani, T. A. Kalyanam |
| 1953 | Chandirani | Composed along with C. R. Subbaraman |
| 1954 | Sorgavasal | Composed along with T. K. Ramamoorthy |
| 1954 | Praja Rajyam | Composed along with T. K. Ramamoorthy |
| 1954 | Sugam Enge | Composed along with T. K. Ramamoorthy |
| 1954 | Maa Gopi | Composed along with T. K. Ramamoorthy |
| 1954 | Vaira Maalai | Composed along with T. K. Ramamoorthy |
| 1954 | Ratha Kanneer | Co-Music by C. S. Jayaraman; Composed along with T. K. Ramamoorthy (Background Score) |
| 1954 | Pona Machaan Thirumbi Vandhan | Composed along with C. N. Pandurangan |
| 1955 | Kaveri | Co-Music by G. Ramanathan; Composed along with T. K. Ramamoorthy |
| 1955 | Jaya Gopi | Composed along with T. K. Ramamoorthy |
| 1955 | Porter Kandan | Composed along with T. K. Ramamoorthy |
| 1955 | Vijaya Gauri | Composed along with T. K. Ramamoorthy |
| 1955 | Gulebakavali | Composed along with T. K. Ramamoorthy |
| 1955 | Needhipathi | Composed along with T. K. Ramamoorthy |
| 1955 | Santosham | Composed along with T. K. Ramamoorthy |
| 1956 | Tenali Raman | Composed along with T. K. Ramamoorthy |
| 1956 | Paasavalai | Composed along with T. K. Ramamoorthy |
| 1957 | Bhaktha Markandeya | Composed along with T. K. Ramamoorthy |
| 1957 | Pudhaiyal | Composed along with T. K. Ramamoorthy |
| 1957 | Pathini Deivam | Composed along with T. K. Ramamoorthy |
| 1957 | Mahadevi | Composed along with T. K. Ramamoorthy; 25th Film |
| 1958 | Kudumba Gouravam | Composed along with T. K. Ramamoorthy |
| 1958 | Pathi Bakthi | Composed along with T. K. Ramamoorthy |
| 1958 | Petra Maganai Vitra Annai | Composed along with T. K. Ramamoorthy |
| 1958 | Maalaiyitta Mangai | Composed along with T. K. Ramamoorthy |
| 1959 | Thanga Padhumai | Composed along with T. K. Ramamoorthy |
| 1959 | Raja Malaya Simhan | Composed along with T. K. Ramamoorthy |
| 1959 | Sivagangai Seemai | Composed along with T. K. Ramamoorthy |
| 1959 | Thalai Koduthaan Thambi | Composed along with T. K. Ramamoorthy |
| 1959 | Bhaaga Pirivinai | Composed along with T. K. Ramamoorthy |
| 1959 | Amudhavalli | Composed along with T. K. Ramamoorthy |

=== 1960s ===
| Year | Film name | Notes |
|---|---|---|
| 1960 | Rathinapuri Ilavarasi | Composed along with T. K. Ramamoorthy |
| 1960 | Ondrupattal Undu Vazhvu | Composed along with T. K. Ramamoorthy |
| 1960 | Kavalai Illaadha Manithan | Composed along with T. K. Ramamoorthy |
| 1960 | Aalukkoru Veedu | Composed along with T. K. Ramamoorthy |
| 1960 | Mannathi Mannan | Composed along with T. K. Ramamoorthy |
| 1961 | Manapanthal | Composed along with T. K. Ramamoorthy |
| 1961 | Paava Mannippu | Composed along with T. K. Ramamoorthy |
| 1961 | Pasamalar | Composed along with T. K. Ramamoorthy |
| 1961 | Palum Pazhamum | Composed along with T. K. Ramamoorthy |
| 1961 | Bhagyalakshmi | Composed along with T. K. Ramamoorthy |
| 1962 | Parthal Pasi Theerum | Composed along with T. K. Ramamoorthy |
| 1962 | Nenjil Or Aalayam | Composed along with T. K. Ramamoorthy |
| 1962 | Nichaya Thamboolam | Composed along with T. K. Ramamoorthy |
| 1962 | Veera Thirumagan | Composed along with T. K. Ramamoorthy |
| 1962 | Bale Pandiya | Composed along with T. K. Ramamoorthy |
| 1962 | Padithal Mattum Podhuma | Composed along with T. K. Ramamoorthy |
| 1962 | Paadha Kaanikkai | Composed along with T. K. Ramamoorthy |
| 1962 | Kathiruntha Kangal | Composed along with T. K. Ramamoorthy |
| 1962 | Paasam | Composed along with T. K. Ramamoorthy |
| 1962 | Policekaran Magal | Composed along with T. K. Ramamoorthy 50th Film |
| 1962 | Thendral Veesum | Composed along with T. K. Ramamoorthy |
| 1962 | Senthamarai | Composed along with T. K. Ramamoorthy |
| 1962 | Bandha Pasam | Composed along with T. K. Ramamoorthy |
| 1962 | Aalayamani | Composed along with T. K. Ramamoorthy |
| 1962 | Sumaithaangi | Composed along with T. K. Ramamoorthy |
| 1963 | Panathottam | Composed along with T. K. Ramamoorthy |
| 1963 | Mani Osai | Composed along with T. K. Ramamoorthy |
| 1963 | Periya Idathu Penn | Composed along with T. K. Ramamoorthy |
| 1963 | Idhayathil Nee | Composed along with T. K. Ramamoorthy |
| 1963 | Anandha Jodhi | Composed along with T. K. Ramamoorthy |
| 1963 | Paar Magaley Paar | Composed along with T. K. Ramamoorthy |
| 1963 | Nenjam Marappathillai | Composed along with T. K. Ramamoorthy |
| 1963 | Idhu Sathiyam | Composed along with T. K. Ramamoorthy |
| 1963 | Karpagam | Composed along with T. K. Ramamoorthy |
| 1964 | Karnan | Composed along with T. K. Ramamoorthy |
| 1964 | Vazhkai Vazhvatharke | Composed along with T. K. Ramamoorthy |
| 1964 | Kadhalikka Neramillai | Composed along with T. K. Ramamoorthy |
| 1964 | En Kadamai | Composed along with T. K. Ramamoorthy |
| 1964 | Pachhai Vilakku | Composed along with T. K. Ramamoorthy |
| 1964 | Panakkara Kudumbam | Composed along with T. K. Ramamoorthy |
| 1964 | Aandavan Kattalai | Composed along with T. K. Ramamoorthy |
| 1964 | Deiva Thai | Composed along with T. K. Ramamoorthy |
| 1964 | Kai Kodutha Deivam | Composed along with T. K. Ramamoorthy |
| 1964 | Puthiya Paravai | Composed along with T. K. Ramamoorthy |
| 1964 | Kalai Kovil | Composed along with T. K. Ramamoorthy 75th Film |
| 1964 | Karuppu Panam | Composed along with T. K. Ramamoorthy |
| 1964 | Padagotti | Composed along with T. K. Ramamoorthy |
| 1964 | Server Sundaram | Composed along with T. K. Ramamoorthy |
| 1965 | Enga Veettu Pillai | Composed along with T. K. Ramamoorthy |
| 1965 | Pazhani | Composed along with T. K. Ramamoorthy |
| 1965 | Poojaikku Vandha Malar | Composed along with T. K. Ramamoorthy |
| 1965 | Vaazhkai Padagu | Composed along with T. K. Ramamoorthy |
| 1965 | Panam Padaithavan | Composed along with T. K. Ramamoorthy |
| 1965 | Vennira Aadai | Composed along with T. K. Ramamoorthy |
| 1965 | Santhi | Composed along with T. K. Ramamoorthy |
| 1965 | Hello Mister Zamindar | Composed along with T. K. Ramamoorthy |
| 1965 | Panchavarna Kili | Composed along with T. K. Ramamoorthy |
| 1965 | Aayirathil Oruvan | Composed along with T. K. Ramamoorthy |
| 1965 | Nee! | |
| 1965 | Kalangarai Vilakkam | |
| 1965 | Kuzhandaiyum Deivamum | |
| 1965 | Maganey Kel | Composed along with T. K. Ramamoorthy |
| 1965 | Neela Vaanam | |
| 1965 | Anandhi | |
| 1966 | Anbe Vaa | 100th Film |
| 1966 | Chitthi | |
| 1966 | Motor Sundaram Pillai | |
| 1966 | Naan Aanaiyittal | |
| 1966 | Kodimalar | |
| 1966 | Nadodi | |
| 1966 | Kumari Penn | |
| 1966 | Chandrodayam | |
| 1966 | Ramu | |
| 1966 | Thattungal Thirakkappadum | |
| 1966 | Enga Paappa | |
| 1966 | Namma Veettu Lakshmi | |
| 1966 | Gowri Kalyanam | |
| 1966 | Parakkum Pavai | |
| 1966 | Petralthan Pillaiya | |
| 1967 | Bama Vijayam | |
| 1967 | Nenjirukkum Varai | |
| 1967 | Anubavam Pudhumai | |
| 1967 | Thangai | |
| 1967 | Anubavi Raja Anubavi | |
| 1967 | Bhavani | |
| 1967 | Selva Magal | |
| 1967 | Kaavalkaaran | |
| 1967 | Iru Malargal | |
| 1967 | Ooty Varai Uravu | |
| 1967 | Pen Endral Pen | 125th Film |
| 1968 | Ragasiya Police 115 | |
| 1968 | Anbu Vazhi | |
| 1968 | Nimirnthu Nil | |
| 1968 | Kudiyirundha Koyil | |
| 1968 | Galatta Kalyanam | |
| 1968 | Kannan En Kadhalan | |
| 1968 | Thamarai Nenjam | |
| 1968 | En Thambi | |
| 1968 | Kuzhanthaikkaga | |
| 1968 | Puthiya Bhoomi | |
| 1968 | Kanavan | |
| 1968 | Kallum Kaniyagum | |
| 1968 | Oli Vilakku | |
| 1968 | Enga Oor Raja | |
| 1968 | Neeyum Naanum | |
| 1968 | Uyira Maanama | |
| 1968 | Lakshmi Kalyanam | |
| 1968 | Uyarndha Manithan | |
| 1969 | Anbalippu | |
| 1969 | Annaiyum Pithavum | |
| 1969 | Athai Magal | |
| 1969 | Deivamagan | |
| 1969 | Kanne Pappa | |
| 1969 | Kanni Penn | |
| 1969 | Nam Naadu | |
| 1969 | Nil Gavani Kadhali | 150th Film |
| 1969 | Odum Nadhi | |
| 1969 | Paalkudam | |
| 1969 | Poova Thalaiya | |
| 1969 | Shanti Nilayam | |
| 1969 | Sivandha Mann | |
| 1969 | Thirudan | |

=== 1970s ===
| Year | Film name | Notes |
|---|---|---|
| 1970 | Ethirkalam | |
| 1970 | Enga Mama | |
| 1970 | Engal Thangam | |
| 1970 | Engirundho Vandhaal | |
| 1970 | Kaaviya Thalaivi | |
| 1970 | Malathi | |
| 1970 | Namma Kuzhandaigal | |
| 1970 | Nilave Nee Satchi | |
| 1970 | Paadhukaappu | |
| 1970 | Raman Ethanai Ramanadi | |
| 1970 | Sorgam | |
| 1970 | Thedi Vandha Mappillai | |
| 1970 | Veettuku Veedu | |
| 1971 | Anbukkor Annan | |
| 1971 | Avalukendru Or Manam | |
| 1971 | Babu | |
| 1971 | Iru Thuruvam | |
| 1971 | Kumari Kottam | |
| 1971 | Muhammed Bin Thuklak | |
| 1971 | Meendum Vazhven | |
| 1971 | Moondru Dheivangal | |
| 1971 | Naangu Suvargal | |
| 1971 | Needhi Devan | 175th Film |
| 1971 | Neerum Neruppum | |
| 1971 | Oru Thaai Makkal | |
| 1971 | Praptham | |
| 1971 | Punnagai | |
| 1971 | Rickshawkaran | |
| 1971 | Savaale Samali | |
| 1971 | Soodhattam | |
| 1971 | Sudarum Sooravaliyum | |
| 1971 | Sumathi En Sundari | |
| 1971 | Thangaikkaaga | |
| 1971 | Thenum Paalum | |
| 1971 | Uttharavindri Ulle Vaa | |
| 1971 | Veettukku Oru Pillai | |
| 1972 | Aasirvadham | |
| 1972 | Dharmam Engey | |
| 1972 | Dhikku Theriyadha Kaattil | |
| 1972 | Enna Mudalali Sowkiyama | |
| 1972 | Gnana Oli | |
| 1972 | Idho Enthan Deivam | |
| 1972 | Kanna Nalama | |
| 1972 | Kasethan Kadavulada | |
| 1972 | Mister Sampath | |
| 1972 | Nawab Naarkali | |
| 1972 | Needhi | |
| 1972 | Pattikada Pattanama | |
| 1972 | Pillaiyo Pillai | |
| 1972 | Raja | |
| 1972 | Raman Thediya Seethai | |
| 1972 | Sange Muzhangu | |
| 1972 | Thangadurai | 200th Film |
| 1972 | Thavapudhalavan | |
| 1973 | Alaigal | |
| 1973 | Baghdad Perazhagi | |
| 1973 | Bharatha Vilas | |
| 1973 | Engal Thai | |
| 1973 | Ganga Gowri | |
| 1973 | Gauravam | |
| 1973 | Manidharil Manikkam | |
| 1973 | Manipayal | |
| 1973 | Nalla Mudivu | |
| 1973 | Paasa Deepam | |
| 1973 | Ponnunjal | |
| 1973 | Pookkari | |
| 1973 | Rajapart Rangadurai | |
| 1973 | School Master | |
| 1973 | Sollathaan Ninaikkiren | |
| 1973 | Sondham | |
| 1973 | Suryakanthi | |
| 1973 | Thalaiprasavam | |
| 1973 | Ulagam Sutrum Valiban | |
| 1973 | Vaayadi | |
| 1974 | Akkarai Pachchai | |
| 1974 | Anbai Thedi | |
| 1974 | Athaiya Mamiya | 225th Film |
| 1974 | Aval Oru Thodar Kathai | |
| 1974 | Dheerga Sumangali | |
| 1974 | En Magan | |
| 1974 | Engal Kula Deivam | |
| 1974 | Kanmani Raja | |
| 1974 | Magalukkaga | |
| 1974 | Maanikka Thottil | |
| 1974 | Naan Avanillai | |
| 1974 | Netru Indru Naalai | |
| 1974 | Panathukkaga | |
| 1974 | Penn Ondru Kanden | |
| 1974 | Roshakkari | |
| 1974 | Samayalkaran | |
| 1974 | Sirithu Vazha Vendum | |
| 1974 | Sivakamiyin Selvan | |
| 1974 | Thaai | |
| 1974 | Thaai Pirandhal | |
| 1974 | Thanga Pathakkam | |
| 1974 | Thirudi | |
| 1974 | Thirumangalyam | |
| 1974 | Urimaikural | |
| 1975 | Apoorva Raagangal | |
| 1975 | Amudha | |
| 1975 | Anaya Vilakku | |
| 1975 | Anbe Aaruyire | |
| 1975 | Avanthan Manithan | |
| 1975 | Dr. Siva | |
| 1975 | Idhayakkani | |
| 1975 | Mamiyar Vijayam | |
| 1975 | Mannavan Vanthaanadi | |
| 1975 | Naalai Namadhe | |
| 1975 | Ninaithadhai Mudippavan | |
| 1975 | Paattum Bharathamum | |
| 1975 | Thaai Veetu Seedhanam | |
| 1975 | Vaira Nenjam | |
| 1975 | Vaazhnthu Kaattugiren | |
| 1976 | Akka | 250th Film |
| 1976 | Chitra Pournami | |
| 1976 | Gruhapravesam | |
| 1976 | Idhaya Malar | |
| 1976 | Lalitha | |
| 1976 | Magarasi Vazhga | |
| 1976 | Manmadha Leelai | |
| 1976 | Mayor Meenakshi | |
| 1976 | Moondru Mudichu | |
| 1976 | Mutthana Mutthallavo | |
| 1976 | Needhikku Thalaivanangu | |
| 1976 | Neeyindri Naanillai | |
| 1976 | O Manju | |
| 1976 | Oorukku Uzhaippavan | |
| 1976 | Oru Kodiyil Iru Malargal | |
| 1976 | Payanam | |
| 1976 | Perum Pughazhum | 275th Film |
| 1976 | Rojavin Raja | |
| 1976 | Sandhadhi | |
| 1976 | Thunive Thunai | |
| 1976 | Unakkaga Naan | |
| 1976 | Ungalil Orutthi | |
| 1976 | Unmaiye Un Vilai Enna | |
| 1976 | Uzhaikkum Karangal | |
| 1976 | Vazhvu En Pakkam | |
| 1976 | Veeduvarai Uravu | |
| 1977 | Aarupushpangal | |
| 1977 | Annan Oru Koyil | |
| 1977 | Avan Oru Sarithiram | 300th Film |
| 1977 | Avargal | |
| 1977 | Deviyin Thirumanam | |
| 1977 | Ellam Avale | |
| 1977 | Enna Thavam Seidhen | |
| 1977 | Gas Light Mangamma | |
| 1977 | Ilaya Thalaimurai | |
| 1977 | Indru Pol Endrum Vaazhga | |
| 1977 | Meenava Nanban | |
| 1977 | Naam Pirandha Mann | |
| 1977 | Nee Vazhavendum | |
| 1977 | Pattina Pravesam | |
| 1977 | Pennai Solli Kutramillai | |
| 1977 | Perumaikkuriyaval | |
| 1977 | Punidha Anthoniar | |
| 1977 | Punniyam Seithaval | |
| 1977 | Sila Nerangalil Sila Manithargal | |
| 1977 | Thani Kudithanam | |
| 1978 | Aayiram Jenmangal | |
| 1978 | Adhirstakaran | |
| 1978 | Agni Pravesam | |
| 1978 | Andaman Kadhali | |
| 1978 | Aval Thandha Uravu | |
| 1978 | En Kelvikku Enna Bathil | |
| 1978 | Ennai Pol Oruvan | |
| 1978 | Ganga Yamuna Kaveri | |
| 1978 | General Chakravarthi | |
| 1978 | Ilayarani Rajalatchumi | |
| 1978 | Iraivan Kodutha Varam | |
| 1978 | Justice Gopinath | |
| 1978 | Kungumam Kathai Solgirathu | |
| 1978 | Madhuraiyai Meetta Sundharapandiyan | |
| 1978 | Nizhal Nijamagiradhu | |
| 1978 | Oru Nadigai Natakam Parkiral | |
| 1978 | Oru Veedu Oru Ulagam | |
| 1978 | Pilot Premnath | |
| 1978 | Punniya Boomi | |
| 1978 | Rudhra Thaandavam | |
| 1978 | Shankar Salim Simon | |
| 1978 | Seervarisai | |
| 1978 | Taxi Driver (1978 film) | |
| 1978 | Thanga Rangan | 325th Film |
| 1978 | Vandikaran Magan | |
| 1978 | Vanakkatukuriya Kathaliye | |
| 1978 | Varuvan Vadivelan | |
| 1978 | Vayasu Ponnu | |
| 1979 | Aadu Paambe | |
| 1979 | Aasaikku Vayasillai | |
| 1979 | Chellakkili | |
| 1979 | Chittira Chevvanam | |
| 1979 | Idhaya Roja | |
| 1979 | Imayam | |
| 1979 | Kama Sasthiram | |
| 1979 | Kizhakkum Merkum Sandikkindrana | |
| 1979 | Kuppathu Raja | |
| 1979 | Maayandi | |
| 1979 | Mahalakshmi | 350th Film |
| 1979 | Mangala Vaathiyam | |
| 1979 | Needhikkumun Neeya Naana | |
| 1979 | Neela Malargal | |
| 1979 | Neelakkadalin Orrathile | |
| 1979 | Ninaithale Inikkum | |
| 1979 | Nool Veli | |
| 1979 | Ore Vaanam Ore Bhoomi | |
| 1979 | Porter Ponnusami | |
| 1979 | Sigappukkal Mookkuthi | |
| 1979 | Sri Ramajayam | |
| 1979 | Suprabatham | |
| 1979 | Thirisoolam | |
| 1979 | Thisai Maariya Paravaigal | |
| Velli Radham | | |

=== 1980s ===
| Year | Film name | Notes |
|---|---|---|
| 1980 | Avan Aval Adhu | |
| 1980 | Azhaithhal Varuven | |
| 1980 | Bhama Rukmani | |
| 1980 | Billa | |
| 1980 | Bombai Mail 109 | |
| 1980 | Deiveega Raagangal | |
| 1980 | Dharma Raja | |
| 1980 | Engal Vathiyar | |
| 1980 | Geetha Oru Shenbagappoo | |
| 1980 | Ivargal Vidhiyasamanavargal | |
| 1980 | Kaalam Badhil Sollum | |
| 1980 | Mazhalai Pattalam | |
| 1980 | Megathukkum Dhagam Undu | |
| 1980 | Oru Kai Osai | |
| 1980 | Oru Velladu Vengaiyagiradhu | |
| 1980 | Polladhavan | |
| 1980 | Ratha Paasam | |
| 1980 | Savithri | |
| 1980 | Sujatha | 375th Film |
| 1980 | Varumayin Niram Sivappu | |
| 1980 | Viswaroopam | |
| 1981 | 47 Natkal | |
| 1981 | Amarakaviyam | |
| 1981 | Anbulla Atthan | |
| 1981 | Andha 7 Naatkal | |
| 1981 | Arumbugal | |
| 1981 | Deiva Thirumanangal | |
| 1981 | Devi Dharisanam | |
| 1981 | Enga Ooru Kannagi | |
| 1981 | Kalthoon | |
| 1981 | Keezh Vaanam Sivakkum | |
| 1981 | Kudumbam Oru Kadambam | |
| 1981 | Kulakozhundhu | |
| 1981 | Lorry Driver Rajakannu | |
| 1981 | Maadi Veettu Ezhai | |
| 1981 | Mohana Punnagai | |
| 1981 | Nadhi Ondru Karai Moondru | |
| 1981 | Pattam Padavi | 400th Film |
| 1981 | Rani | |
| 1981 | Ranuva Veeran | |
| 1981 | Sathya Sundharam | |
| 1981 | Savaal | |
| 1981 | Thanneer Thanneer | |
| 1981 | Thee | |
| 1981 | Thillu Mullu | |
| 1981 | Thiruppangal | |
| 1982 | Agni Sakshi | |
| 1982 | Anu | |
| 1982 | Deviyin Thiruvilayadal | |
| 1982 | Erattai Manithan | |
| 1982 | Garuda Saukiyama | |
| 1982 | Hitler Umanath | |
| 1982 | Kanmani Poonga | |
| 1982 | Manal Kayiru | |
| 1982 | Murai Ponnu | |
| 1982 | Naan Kudhitthukonde Iruppen | |
| 1982 | Oorukku Oru Pillai | |
| 1982 | Oru Varisu Vuruvagiradhu | |
| 1982 | Paritchaikku Neramaachu | 425th Film |
| 1982 | Pokkiri Raja | |
| 1982 | Sangili | |
| 1982 | Simla Special | |
| 1982 | Thambathyam Oru Sangeetham | |
| 1982 | Theerpu | |
| 1982 | Thunaivi | |
| 1982 | Thyagi | |
| 1982 | Vaa Kanna Vaa | |
| 1982 | Vadai Malai | |
| 1982 | Vasandhathil or Naal | |
| 1983 | Brammacharigal | |
| 1983 | Dowry Kalyanam | |
| 1983 | Idhu Enga Naadu | |
| 1983 | Miruthanga Chakravarthi | |
| 1983 | Naalu Perukku Nandri | |
| 1983 | Nenjodu Nenjam | |
| 1983 | Oru Indhiya Kanavu | |
| 1983 | Poikkal Kudhirai | |
| 1983 | Sandhippu | |
| 1983 | Saranalayam | |
| 1983 | Silk Silk Silk | |
| 1983 | Sivappu Sooriyan | |
| 1983 | Sumangali | |
| 1983 | Thambadhigal | 450th Film |
| 1983 | Unmaigal | |
| 1983 | Yamirukka Bayamen | |
| 1983 | Yudha Kandam | |
| 1984 | Alaya Deepam | |
| 1984 | Chiranjeevi | |
| 1984 | Iru Medhaigal | |
| 1984 | Nenjathai Allitha | |
| 1984 | Puyal Kadantha Bhoomi | |
| 1984 | Rajathanthiram | |
| 1984 | Raja Veettu Kannukkutty | |
| 1984 | Sarithira Nayagan | |
| 1984 | Sirai | |
| 1984 | Tharaasu | |
| 1984 | Thiruppam | |
| 1985 | Ammavum Neeye Appavum Neeye | |
| 1985 | Aval Sumangalithan | |
| 1985 | Erimalai | |
| 1985 | Janani | |
| 1985 | Mookkanan Kaiyiru | |
| 1985 | Navagraha Nayagi | |
| 1985 | Nermai | |
| 1985 | Partha Gyabagam Illayo | |
| 1985 | Sugamana Raagangal | |
| 1985 | Unnai Vidamatten | |
| 1986 | Aval Oru Thamizhachi | |
| 1986 | Cinema Cinema | Not Released |
| 1986 | Deiva Magal | Not Released |
| 1986 | Jeeva Nadhi | |
| 1986 | Kanne Kaniyamudhe | |
| 1986 | Manakanakku | 475th Film |
| 1986 | Meendum Pallavi | |
| 1986 | Mella Thirandhathu Kadhavu | along with Ilaiyaraaja |
| 1986 | Nambinar Keduvathillai | |
| 1986 | Nilave Malare | |
| 1986 | Sigappu Malargal | |
| 1986 | Vasantha Raagam | |
| 1987 | Ilangeswaran | |
| 1987 | Kaalam Marudhu | |
| 1987 | Kadhai Kadhaiyam Karanamaam | |
| 1987 | Koottu Puzhukkal | |
| 1987 | Mupperum Deviyar | |
| 1987 | Neethikku Thandanai | |
| 1987 | Neram Nallayirukku | 500th Film |
| 1987 | Sattam Oru Vilaiyattu | |
| 1987 | Thaali Dhanam | |
| 1987 | Valayal Satham | |
| 1987 | Velundu Vinaiyillai | |
| 1988 | Oomai Thurai | |
| 1988 | Sudhanthira Naattin Adimaigal | |
| 1988 | Thanga Kalasam | |
| 1988 | Thappu Kanakku | |
| 1989 | Dravidan | |
| 1989 | En Arumai Manaivi | |
| 1989 | Meenatchi Thiruvilayadal | |
| 1989 | Rajanadai | |
| 1989 | Rasathi Kalyanam | |
| 1989 | Varam | |

=== 1990s ===
| Year | Film name | Notes |
|---|---|---|
| 1990 | Silambu | |
| 1990 | Eerikarai Poongaatre | |
| 1991 | Gnana Paravai | |
| 1991 | Irumbu Pookkal | Composed along with Ilaiyaraaja |
| 1992 | Jodi Sendhachhu | |
| 1992 | Neenga Nalla Irukkanum | |
| 1992 | Senthamizh Pattu | Composed along with Ilaiyaraaja |
| 1993 | Pathini Penn | |
| 1993 | Dhool Parakuthu | |
| 1994 | Senthamizh Selvan | Composed along with Ilaiyaraaja |
| 1995 | Engirundho Vandhan | Composed along with T.K. Ramamoorthy |
| 1995 | Ilakkiya Solai | |
| 1995 | Manikandan Mahimai | |
| 1996 | Vetri Vinayagar | |
| 1997 | Om Saravana Bhava | |
| 1998 | Kaadhal Mannan | Composed 1 song |

=== 2000s ===
| Year | Film name | Notes |
|---|---|---|
| 2004 | Vishwa Thulasi | Composed along with Ilaiyaraaja |
| 2008 | Valiban Sutrum Ulagam | |

=== 2010s ===
| Year | Film name | Notes |
|---|---|---|
| 2013 | Thillu Mullu | Composed along with Yuvan Shankar Raja |
| 2013 | Suvadugal | |

== Malayalam films ==
1. Lanka Dahanam
2. Manthrakodi
3. Panitheeratha Veedu
4. Jesus
5. Divya Darsanam
6. Chandrakaantham
7. Jeevikkan Marannupoya Sthree
8. Babu Mon
9. Ullasa Yaathra
10. Dharmakshetre Kurukshetre
11. Aval Oru Thudar Kadha
12. Panchami
13. Ajayanum Vijayanum
14. Yakshagaanam
15. Themmadi Velappan
16. Rajayogam
17. Kuttavum Sikshayum
18. Hridayame Saakshi
19. Ormakal Marikkumo
20. Akshayapaathram
21. Rathi Manmadhan
22. Amme Anupame
23. Parivarthanam
24. Sangamam
25. Chila Nerangalil Chila Manushyar
26. Madhurikkunna Rathri
27. Randu Penkuttikal
28. Sundarimaarude Swapnangal
29. Muhammadum Musthafayum
30. Velluvili
31. Snehathinte Mukhangal
32. Itha Oru Manushyan
33. Randilonnu
34. Viswaroopam
35. Iniyum Kanam
36. Indradhanussu
37. Simhasanam
38. Pathivritha
39. Venalil Oru Mazha
40. Vadaka Veedu
41. Oru Ragam Pala Thalam
42. Jeevitham Oru Ganam
43. Mani Koya Kurup
44. Ezham Kadalinakkare
45. Lorry
46. Theeram Thedunnavar
47. Swarga Devatha
48. Avan Oru Ahankaari
49. Kolilakkam
50. Panchapandavar
51. Jeevikkan Padikkanam
52. Thirakal Ezhuthiya Kavitha
53. Anguram
54. Marmaram
55. Kaikeyi
56. Sneha Bandhanam
57. Ariyaatha Veethikal
58. Minimol Vathikkanil
59. Athirathram
60. Thennal Thedunna Poovu
61. Idanilangal
62. Priyamvadakkoru Pranayageetham
63. Amme Bhagavathi
64. Bhagavan
65. Ariyatha Bandham
66. Samskaram
67. Kaiyethum Dhoorathu
68. Iyer the Great
69. Oliyambukal
70. Veeralippattu
71. Sthreekku Vendi Sthree
72. Sabarimalayil Thanka Sooryodayam
73. Amma Ammaayiyamma
74. Valkannezhuthi (Hold)

== Telugu films ==
1. Praja Rajyam (1950)
2. Chandirani (1953)
3. Ammalakkalau (1953)
4. Maa Gopi (1954)
5. Santosham (1955)
6. Tenali Ramakrishna (1956)
7. Bhakta Markandeya (1956)
8. Pelli Tamboolam (1961)
9. Intiki Deepam Illale (1961)
10. Aasa Jeevulu (1962)
11. Ammai Kaarisi
12. Manchi Chedu (1963)
13. Aada Bratuku (1965)
14. Leta Manasulu (1966)
15. Manase Mandiram (1966)
16. Bhale Kodallu (1968)
17. Sattekalapu Satteyya (1969)
18. Sipayi Chinnayya (1969)
19. Memoo Manushulame (1973)
20. Premalu Pellillu (1974)
21. Anthuleni Katha (1976)
22. Chilakamma Cheppindi (1977)
23. Moratodu (1977)
24. Naalaaga Endaro (1978)
25. Simha Baludu (1978)
26. Maro Charitra (1978)
27. Kukka Katuku Cheppu Debba (1979)
28. Andamaina Anubhavam (1979)
29. Idi Katha Kaadu (1979)
30. Guppedu Manasu (1979)
31. Triloka Sundari (1980)
32. Ammayi Mogudu Mamaku Yamudu (1980)
33. Oorukichchina Maata (1981)
34. Aakali Rajyam (1981)
35. 47 Rojulu (1981)
36. Tholi Kodi Koosindi (1981)
37. Ramadandu (1981)
38. Pelleedu Pillalu (1982)
39. Kokilamma (1983)
40. Maanasa Veena (1984)
41. Chatte Kaladi Chattaiya
42. Laila (1989)
43. Radhamma Kapuram (also known as Vichitra Pelli) (1990)
44. Samrat Ashoka (1992)

== Kannada films ==
1. Bhaktha Markandeya (1957)
2. Vijayanagarada Veeraputra (1961)
3. Makkala Sainya (1980)
4. Ganeshana Mahime (1981)
5. Benkiyalli Aralida Hoovu (1983)
6. Eradu Rekhegalu (1984)
7. Balondu Uyyale (1985)
8. Mamatheya Madilu (1985)
9. Devathe (1986)
10. Super Boy (1986)
11. Sri Venkateshwara Mahime (1988)
12. Manikantana Mahime (1993)

== Television ==
- Ganga Yamuna Saraswathi
- Sherlock Mami

== Non-film works ==
| S.No | Album name | Year | Notes |
|---|---|---|---|
| 1. | Krishna Gaanam | 1977 | Devotional album on Lord Krishna written by Kannadasan consist of 8 songs. |
| 2. | Arul Tharum Ambigai | | Devotional album on Ambigai consist of 9 songs sung by Bombay Jayashri |
| 3. | Thrilling Thematic Tunes | 1970 | An ensemble instrumental album consist of 11 tracks. This is the first stereo based recording in Tamil music industry. |
| 4. | Sangeetham Sandhosham | | First Tamil ghazhal Album. |
| 5. | Sangamam | 1991 | Carnatic-Western fusion album collaborated with Maharajapuram Santhanam. Western orchestrations for Carnatic krithis. |
| 6. | Ponnusal | 2004 | Album based on Thiruvasagam consist of 20 songs. |
| 7. | Deiveega Sangamam | | Carnatic album composed and orchestrated by M. S. Viswanathan and sung by T. N. Seshagopalan. |
| 8. | Dhandayudhabani Supprabhadam | | Devotional album on Lord Kartikeya sung by Nithyasree Mahadevan. |
| 9. | Annamalai Kaithozha | | Devotional album on Lord Shiva based on Tevaram and Thiruvasagam. |
| 10. | Venu Gaanam | 1998 | Devotional album on Lord Krishna consist of 7 songs sung by S.P.B, T.M.S, Vani Jairam, Uma Ramanan, Rajkumar Bharathi |
| 11. | Yesu Kaaviyam | | Christian devotional album |
| 12. | Kalima | | An Islamic devotional album sung by S. P. Balasubrahmanyam |
| 13. | Oona Pookal | 1986 | A Malayalam album for Onam festival sung by K. J. Yesudas, P. Jayachandran, S. Janaki and K. S. Chithra. |
| 14. | Lalitha Gaanangal | 2006 | A Malayalam album; songs based on Nature. |
| 15. | Sri Ramana Naadha Amudham | | Devotional album on Ramana Maharshi consist of 10 songs composed by M. S. Viswanathan, lyrics written by Vaali (poet) and Ilaiyaraaja. |
| 16. | Thiruvannamalai Songs | | Devotional album on Lord Shiva composed along with Ilaiyaraaja. |
| 17. | Om Saravana bhava | 1996 | Carnatic devotional album on Lord Muruga. |
| 18. | Kannanuku Dasan Kannadasan | 1985 | Devotional album on Lord Krishna. Songs written by Kannadasan and sung by M. S. Viswanathan, Ilaiyaraaja and various singers. |
| 19. | Sri Venkatesa Gaanam | | Devotional album on Lord Venkateshwara consist of 10 songs. |
| 20. | Vadivelazhaga Vaa | 2006 | Devotional album on Lord Murugan consist of 8 songs sung by S. P. Balasubrahmanyam. |
| 21. | Saranam Ponnayappa | 1996 | Devotional album on Lord Ayyappa consist of 10 songs sung by S.P.B, Malaysia Vasudevan, K. J. Yesudas, T. L. Maharajan, Mano (singer). |
| 22. | Saravana Geetham | 1994 | Devotional album on Lord Murugan consist of 10 songs sung by Mano (singer) and K. S. Chithra. |
| 23. | Swami Manikanda | 1991 | Kannada devotional album on Lord Ayyappa consist of 10 songs sung by L.R.Eswari. |
| 24. | Isaithaen Isaitaen | 1989 | Non-film musical album consist of 8 songs sung by M. S. Viswanathan, S.P.B, Mano (singer) and K. S. Chithra. |
| 25. | Saranasanithi | | Malayalam Devotional Album on Lord Ayyappa sung by P. Jayachandran. |
| 26. | Velankanni | | Christian devotional album on Velankanni sung by P. Susheela, K. J. Yesudas and L.R.Eswari. |
| 27. | Ave Mary | 2013 | Christian devotional album on Mary, mother of Jesus sung by S.P.B, Vani Jairam, T. L. Maharajan, Srinivas (singer), Kalpana Raghavendar, Ananthu. |
| 28. | Shirdi Sai Baba Saranam | 2005 | Devotional album on Shirdi Sai Baba |

== Actor ==
Films

- Kaadhal Mannan (1998)
- Kaathala Kaathala (1998)
- Rojavanam (1999)
- Enge Enadhu Kavithai (2002)
- Anbe Vaa (2005)
- Thaka Thimi Tha (2005)
- Maharaja (2011)
- Thillu Mullu (2013)

Television

- Kalki (Jaya TV)
- Jannal – Marabu Kavithaigal (Raj TV)

== Singer ==
| Film name | Song name | Co-singer | Composer | Notes |
|---|---|---|---|---|
| Muthana Muthallavo | "Enakkoru Kadhali" | with SPB | | |
| Taxi Driver | "Idhu rajagopura deepam" | with SPB | | |
| Koottup puzhukkal | "Nitham nitham en kannodu" | with SPB | | |
| Mayor Meenakshi | "Irunda nalla iru" | with Vani Jairam | | |
| Kuzhandaiyum Deivamum | " Naan nandri solven" | with P. Susheela | | |
| Akkarai pachai | Illadha porul meedhu | | | |
| Pasamalar | Anbu Malar | | | |
| Kudumbam Oru Kadambam | "Kudumbam Oru" | | | |
| Dowry Kalyanam | "Andavane Kanthirandhu" | | | |
| Engal vathiyar | "Naarai narai senkal narai" | | | |
| Oru kodiyil iru malargal | "Uppa thinnavan thanni kudippan" | | | |
| Neelakadalin orathile | "Dhagathukku thanni kudichen" | | | |
| Erimalai | "Elakka malai mele" | | | |
| Kaaviya Thalaivi | Nerana Nedunchalai | | | |
| Thanneer Thanneer | Thanneer thanneer kanda pinbu | | | |
| Muhammad bin Tughluq | Allah Allah Nee Illadha Idame illai | | | |
| Krishna Gaanam a non-filmi album | Amara jeevidham | | | |
| Sivagamiyin Selvan | Edharkum oru kalam undu | | | |
| Ninaithale Inikkum | Sambo siva sambo | | | |
| Vazhvu En Pakkam | Thirupati malaiyil | | | |
| Sollathaan Ninaikkiren | Sollathaan Ninaikkiren | with S. Janaki | | |
| Sila Nerangalil Sila Manithargal | Kandadhai sollugiren | | | |
| Keezh Vaanam Sivakkum | Enakkodru vidivelli | | | |
| Payanam | Payanam Payanam | | | |
| Thai veettu seedhanam | Yarukkum vaazhkkai undu | | | |
| Mr. Sampath | Ore Kelvi unai ketpen | | | |
| Uruvangal maralam | "Andavane unnai vandhu" | | S. V. Ramanan | |
| Sangamam | "Mazhaithuli" | Hariharan | A. R. Rahman | |
| Panchamirtham | "Panchamirtham" | | Sundar C. Babu | |
| Kadhal Mannan | "Mettu thedi thavikkudu oru pattu" | M.S.Viswanathan | main film music composed by Bharadwaj, this particular song composed by MSV | |
| Madarasapattinam | "Meghame O Meghame" | | G. V. Prakash Kumar | |
| Sutta Kadhai | "Yele Yele" | | Madley Blues | |
| Kannathil Muthamittal | Vidai kodu engal | | A.R. Rahman | |
| Mannar Valaikuda | "Saami Namma Saami indha Bhoomi" | | Sivapragasam | |
| Savale Samali | Annai Bhoomi | | | |
| Velli vizha | Unakkenna korachal | | V. Kumar | |
| Thai mookambigai | Thaye mookambige | with M. Balamuralikrishna, Sirkazhi Govindarajan | Ilayaraja | |
| Unnai saranadainthen | Natpu Natpu | with "SPB" and "Ilayaraja' | S.P.Balasubramanian | |
| Namma Ooru Nalla Ooru | Odam enge | | Gangai Amaran | |
