= V. N. Sundaram =

- Born: 1918
- Origin: Visalur, Thanjavur, India
- Died: 2009 (aged 90–91) Chennai, India
- Genres: Carnatic singer Playback singer
- Occupation: Singer

V.N. Sundaram (1918 - 2009 ) was an indian singer who sang mostly in Tamil-language films

== Early life ==
Born in 1918 in Visalur - a village in Kumbakonam Taluk of Thanjavur district, he was named AlasyaSundaram.

As a boy he listened to Nadaswaram music during temple festivals and had the ability to repeat the Ragas by voice.

He joined Nataraja Gana Saba, a boys' stage troupe, as an actor at the age of 12. He was a strict vegetarian. But in the troupe Veg and Non-veg food were cooked. He could not tolerate this and left the troupe within 6 months.

He then joined the Madurai Bala Vinodha Sangeetha Sabha, another boys' stage drama troupe. He was trained by Yadhartham Ponnusamy Pillai and was given Raja part in his 3rd stage play. That play, Paduka Pattabhishekam was a hit. In order to limit space in the poster, his name was written as V. N. Sundaram. Then onwards he was known by that name.

== Actor in films ==
His first film was Markandeya released in 1935. He was featured in the title role. Papanasam Sivan composed the song paraat paraa in the raga Vachaspathi and Sundaram sang that song. It was a hit. Later M. S. Subbulakshmi sang the song and made it popular.

Pattinathar (1936) film featured M. M. Dandapani Desikar in the title role. Sundaram acted as Pattinathar's son, Marudhavanan. Sundaram acted in the title roles in Chandrahasan (1936) Sundaramoorthi Nayanar (1937), Kannappa Nayanar (1938) and Sankarachariyar (1939) His other films are Appoothi Adigal (1941), Rajasooyam (1942) and finally Dhana Amaravati (1947). After the latter half of the 1940s, films with social themes became the trend. Sundaram, who acted mainly in Puranic films did not get any acting chances. So he shifted on to the music field as a playback singer.

== Playback singer ==
His first song as playback singer was Sinnanjiru kiliye Kannamma written by Bharathiyar. Music was scored by C. R. Subbaraman. It was a duet and M. L. Vasanthakumari was his co-singer. From then on he has sung many remarkable songs till 1962.

== Filmography ==
=== As actor and singer ===
Year	Film	Song	Music director	Co-singer
1935	Markandeya	Anbudan Vidai Tharuveer		
1935	Markandeya	Paraatparaa Paramesvaraa		Rajapalayam Kuzhandaivel Bhagavathar
1935	Markandeya	Kailaasa Vaasaa, Sambho		
1935	Markandeya	Adhaaram Yaarum Illai Aiyaa		
1935	Markandeya	Viswanaadhaa Enai Aandarulvaai		
1935	Markandeya	O Siva Paramporule		
1935	Markandeya	Saranam Saranam		
1936	Chandrahasan	Maayane Enai Yaar		
1936	Chandrahasan	Theevinaiyum Idhuvo Deivame		
1936	Chandrahasan	Maha Parama Dayala Moorthiye		
1936	Chandrahasan	Paadhamalarai Paninden		
1936	Chandrahasan	Poomaadho Radhi Deviyo		
1937	Sundaramoorthi Nayanar	Thillai Vaazh Andhanar Tham		
1937	Sundaramoorthi Nayanar	Mugathai Kaattiye		
1937	Sundaramoorthi Nayanar	Idhu Vasantha Kaalam Penne		
1938	Kannappa Nayanar	Saambavari Thunai Puri		
1938	Kannappa Nayanar	Vasantha Jothi Azhage		
1938	Kannappa Nayanar	Unnai Marandiduveno		
1938	Kannappa Nayanar	Deva Nin Thiruvadi		
1947	Dhana Amaravathi	Endisaiyum Vanangi Ethum		

=== As Playback singer ===
Year	Film	Language	Song	Music director	Co-singer
1947	Thaai Nadu	Tamil	Engal Indhiya Bharathiye	R. Narayana Iyer	A. P. Komala
1950	Chandrika	Malayalam	Hello My Dear Ting Ting	V. Dakshinamoorthy & G. Govindarajulu Naidu	
1951	Manamagal	Tamil	Chinnanchiru Kiliye Kannammaa	C. R. Subburaman	M. L. Vasanthakumari
1951	Manamagal	Tamil	Paaviyinum Padu Paavi	C. R. Subburaman	M. L. Vasanthakumari
1951	Rajambal	Tamil	Idhaya Thaamarai Malara Seivadhum	M. S. Gnanamani	P. Leela
1953	Inspector	Tamil	Varuvaai Manamohanaa	G. Ramanathan	M. L. Vasanthakumari
1953	Poongothai	Tamil	Neelavaan Nedungkundram .. Yen Padaitthaai	P. Adinarayana Rao	
1954	Avakasi	Malayalam	Thulli Thulli Odi Vaa	Br Lakshmanan	N. L. Ganasaraswathi
1954	Avakasi	Malayalam	Kaliyodamithil	Br Lakshmanan	Kamukara Purushothaman & N. Lalitha
1954	Kalyanam Panniyum Brahmachari	Tamil	Kaviyin Kanavil Vaazhum Kaviyame	T. G. Lingappa	
1954	Kalyanam Panniyum Brahmachari	Tamil	Azhage Penn Vadivamaana	T. G. Lingappa	Soolamangalam Rajalakshmi
1954	Koondukkili	Tamil	Raatthirikku Boovaavukku Laatteri	K. V. Mahadevan	T. M. Soundararajan & K. V. Mahadevan
1954	Koondukkili	Tamil	Vaanga Ellorume Ondraagave	K. V. Mahadevan	T. M. Soundararajan, Radha Jayalakshmi & K. Rani
1954	Koondukkili	Tamil	Kaayaadha Kaanagatthe	K. V. Mahadevan	T. M. Soundararajan
1954	Pona Machaan Thirumbi Vandhan	Tamil	Odam Polae Namadhu	C. N. Pandurangan & M. S. Viswanathan	A. L. Raghavan, T. Sathyavathi & Subbulakshmi
1954	Rajee En Kanmani	Tamil	Ulagam Idhuthaano	S. Hanumantha Rao	
1954	Thookku Thookki	Tamil	Kuranginilirundhu Pirandhavan	G. Ramanathan	P. Leela, A. P. Komala & T. M. Soundararajan
1954	Thookku Thookki	Tamil	Pyari Nimbal Mele	G. Ramanathan	M. S. Rajeswari
1955	CID	Malayalam	Kaalamellaamullaasam	Br Lakshmanan	P. Leela & N. L. Ganasaraswathi
1955	CID	Tamil	Inai Illaadha Suga Vaazhvil	Br Lakshmanan	A. M. Rajah, P. Leela & Sarojini
1955	Mahakavi Kalidhas	Tamil	Raajendhraa Em Rasiganiye	C. Honnappa Bhagavathar	
1955	Mahakavi Kalidhas	Tamil	Kulla Nariyo Kokkarikkudhe	C. Honnappa Bhagavathar	
1955	Mahakavi Kalidhas	Tamil	Singaara Vaagini Manamogini	C. Honnappa Bhagavathar	
1955	Mahakavi Kalidhas	Tamil	Vaaraai Vaaraai Vaaraai	C. Honnappa Bhagavathar	R. Balasaraswathi Devi
1955	Mahakavi Kalidhas	Tamil	Omkaara Roobini	C. Honnappa Bhagavathar	R. Balasaraswathi Devi
1955	Nallavan	Tamil	Bharathiye Nam Bharadha	M. S. Gnanamani	
1955	Nam Kuzhandai	Tamil	Deivathaal Agaadhenin	M. D. Parthasarathy	
1955	Porter Kandan	Tamil	Aadhiyaai Ulagukkellaam	Viswanathan–Ramamoorthy	
1955	Valliyin Selvan	Tamil	Kannaa Endradhum	P. S. Anantharaman	
1956	Charana Daasi	Telugu	Tharumaarulaadeveme Vayyaari	S. Rajeswara Rao	
1956	Marma Veeran	Tamil	Munnaale Pogaame	Vedha	T. M. Soundararajan
1956	Mathar Kula Manickam	Tamil	Enakke Thaaramaadi	S. Rajeswara Rao	
1956	Naane Raja	Tamil	Sindhu Paadum Thendral Vandhu	T. R. Ramanathan	P. Leela
1956	Ondre Kulam	Tamil	Mangkilai Mele Poonguyil Kooviyadhu	S. V. Venkatraman	N. L. Ganasaraswathi, K. Rani, M. S. Rajeswari & Kalyani
1956	Tenali Raman	Tamil	Adari Padarndha	Viswanathan–Ramamoorthy	
1956	Tenali Raman	Tamil	Ponnalla Porul	Viswanathan–Ramamoorthy	
1956	Tenali Raman	Tamil	Kannaa Pinnaa Mannaa	Viswanathan–Ramamoorthy	
1956	Tenali Raman	Tamil	Vindhiyam Vadakkaaga	Viswanathan–Ramamoorthy	
1956	Tenali Raman	Tamil	Chandhiran Pole	Viswanathan–Ramamoorthy	
1956	Tenali Raman	Tamil	Drru Drru Ena Maadugal	Viswanathan–Ramamoorthy	
1956	Tenali Raman	Tamil	Thaadhi Thoodhu Theedhu	Viswanathan–Ramamoorthy	
1957	Ambikapathy	Tamil	Soru Manakkum Cho Naadaam	G. Ramanathan	
1957	Ambikapathy	Tamil	Kottikkizhango Kizhango	G. Ramanathan	
1957	Ambikapathy	Tamil	Ennarum Nalathinaal	G. Ramanathan	
1957	Ambikapathy	Tamil	Annalum Nokinaan Avalum Nokkkinaal	G. Ramanathan	
1957	Bhaktha Markandeya	Tamil	Ulagamellaam	Viswanathan–Ramamoorthy	
1957	Bhaktha Markandeya	Tamil	Daevaadhi Dhaevaa	Viswanathan–Ramamoorthy	
1957	Mudhalali	Tamil	Enga Mudhalali Thanga	K. V. Mahadevan	S. V. Ponnusamy, A. G. Rathnamala & G. Kasthoori
1957	Thangamalai Ragasiyam	Tamil	Ariyaadha Pillai Pole Aaatthira Padalaamaa	T. G. Lingappa	Jikki
1958	Chenchu Lakshmi	Tamil	Alitthidum Avamadhippaiyai Naan Nasukkuven	S. Rajeswara Rao	
1958	Chenchu Lakshmi	Tamil	Inngiruppano Anggiruppano Endra Aiyame	S. Rajeswara Rao	P. Susheela
1958	Maalaiyitta Mangai	Tamil	Ammaa Unnai Kondu Vanatthile	Viswanathan–Ramamoorthy	
1958	Padhi Bhakti	Tamil	Rock Rock Rock n Roll	Viswanathan–Ramamoorthy	J. P. Chandrababu
1958	Padhi Bhakti	Telugu	Rock Rock Rock n Roll	T. Chalapathi Rao	J. P. Chandrababu
1958	Vanji Kottai Valipan	Tamil	Thaedi Thaedi Alaigirene	C. Ramachandra	Thiruchi Loganathan & P. Susheela
1959	Aval Yaar	Tamil	Vaaraaru Vaaraaru Vanthukitte	S. Rajeswara Rao	
1959	Sivagangai Seemai	Tamil	Maruvirukkum Koondhal	Viswanathan–Ramamoorthy	
1959	Sivagangai Seemai	Tamil	Aalikkum Kaigal	Viswanathan–Ramamoorthy	
1959	Veerapandiya Kattabomman	Tamil	Vetrivadivelane.... Manam Kanindharul	G. Ramanathan	S. Varalakshmi
1960	Engal Selvi	Tamil	Jaya Jaya Jaya Raamaa	K. V. Mahadevan	
1960	Kumara Raja	Tamil	Manamagalaaga Varum Mangai Evalo	T. R. Pappa	
1960	Kumara Raja	Tamil	Naan Vandhu Serndha Idam	T. R. Pappa	P. Leela
1960	Naan Kanda Sorgam	Tamil	Parama Kirupa Nandana	G. Aswathama	
1961	Ennai Paar	Tamil	Moothor Sol Vaarthai Thaan	T. G. Lingappa	
1961	Sabarimala Ayyappan	Malayalam	Aararivoo Nin Maaya	S. M. Subbaiah Naidu	
1962	Mahaveera Bheeman	Tamil	Aayathor Nagaraitho	M. S. Gnanamani	
1963	Lava Kusa	Tamil	Vetri Murasu Olikka Seiyyum	K. V. Mahadevan & Ghantasala	K. Rani
1964	Ramadasu	Telugu	Ee Desama Nununduvaru	G. Aswathama	Seerkazhi Govindarajan & Madhavapeddi Satyam
1964	Rishyasingar	Tamil	Thalam Pugazhum Uyar	T. V. Raju	

== Death ==
Sundaram died on 14 December 2009 at the age of 92.
