= Viswanathan–Ramamoorthy =

Indian music composing duo

Viswanathan–Ramamoorthy were an Indian music composing duo comprising M. S. Viswanathan and T. K. Ramamoorthy. They worked together on over 100 films, from 1952's Panam to 1965's Aayirathil Oruvan. After their split, Ramamoorthy worked on 16 films between 1966 and 1986. He and Viswanathan reunited in 1995 for Engirundho Vandhan.

== Early lives ==
=== Ramamoorthy ===
Ramamoorthy, born into a well-known musical family in Trichy, was a capable violinist at an early age. His father (Krishnasamy Pillai) and grandfather, Malaikottai Govindasamy Pillai, were noted violinists in Trichy. As a child, Ramamoorthy performed several times with his father. During the early 1940s he worked for Saraswathi Stores (in which AVM Productions owner Avichi Meiyappa Chettiar was a partner), and played violin for AVM composer R. Sudharsanam in several films. Ramamoorthy became friendly with P. S. Diwakar, the pianist-composer of Malayalam cinema, and roomed with P. S. Diwakar. C. R. Subburaman hired him as a violinist for His Master's Voice. By the late 1940s, Ramamoorthy joined C. R. Subburaman's South Indian film-music ensemble and met fellow violinist T. G. Lingappa.

=== Viswanathan ===
Viswanathan, who had acting and singing ambitions, had a few minor stage roles during the 1940s. The famous music composer in the 1950s T. R. Pappa who was a violinist for the doyen of Tamil film music S. V. Venkatraman, met him and got him a job as an errand boy. Viswanathan developed an interest in composition, and joined S. M. Subbaiah Naidu. He played the harmonium for C. R. Subburaman and met Ramamoorthy and T. G. Lingappa, another leading violinist. In addition to the harmonium, Viswanathan began playing piano at an early age.

== Career ==
=== With Subburaman ===
With C. R. Subburaman, Viswanathan played the harmonium and Ramamoorthy the violin. Although both considered Subburaman their mentor, Viswanathan was also inspired by the music of S. V. Venkatraman and T. R. Pappa.

In 1952 Subburaman died unexpectedly, leaving the music for several films unfinished. Ramamoorthy and Viswanathan completed the background music for Devadas, Chandirani, Marumagal and Kaadhal. Viswanathan then suggested a south-Indian partnership to Ramamoorthy, similar to Shankar Jaikishan in the north. Initially reluctant, Ramamoorthy agreed.

=== First film ===
Their first film was Panam, written by A. L. Seenivasan and directed by N. S. Krishnan (who supported their partnership). Their musical training and personalities differed; the shy Ramamoorthy had a Carnatic musical background and Viswanathan, lacking Carnatic training, was a dynamic individual.

Panam was Sivaji Ganesan's second film and his first appearance with Padmini. Although the duo were initially supposed to be billed as Ramamoorthy-Viswanathan, N. S. Krishnan felt having Viswanathan's name first sounded better and told Ramamoorthy, "You are senior to him so you can be behind him, supporting him" and Ramamoorthy assented.

Composer and singer C. S. Jayaraman commissioned Viswanathan–Ramamoorthy for Ratha Kanneer's background music, writing the songs himself.

=== Success ===
Success was slow in coming during a period which featured composers such as G. Ramanathan, S. V. Venkatraman, K. V. Mahadevan, S. Rajeswara Rao, S. Dakshinamurthi and Pendyala Nageswara Rao. In the wake of Panam's success, however, Viswanathan–Ramamoorthy wrote music for over 100 films from 1952 to 1965 and were the most successful composers from 1957 to 1965.

They had a flair for light, sweet melodies, and 1950s films such as Porter Kandan, Paasavalai, Thenali Raman, Gulebakavali, Sugam Enge and Sorgavasal attracted attention. In 1956 Viswanathan–Ramamoorthy composed music for Santosham, the Telugu adaptation of the Tamil film Velaikaari with N. T. Rama Rao and Anjali Devi, which was a musical hit. It was reprised in Hindi as Naya Aadmi with music by Madan Mohan, who wanted to keep some of the original songs in the Hindi version. The Hindi song "Laut gaya gam ka zamana", sung by Lata Mangeshkar and Hemanta Kumar Mukhopadhyay, copies the duo's Telugu song Teeyani Eenati Reyi (sung by P. Susheela and G. K. Venkatesh) and was a hit in the north.

During the late 1950s, Viswanathan–Ramamoorthy composed for musical hits such as Pudhaiyal, Nichaya Thaamboolam, Padhi Bhakti and Bhaaga Pirivinai. They enjoyed continued success into the early 1960s with directors T. R. Ramanna and A. Bhimsingh. After a 1961 disagreement with his composer, A. M. Rajah, C. V. Sridhar commissioned Viswanathan–Ramamoorthy for his films and Gemini Studios and AVM Productions later engaged the duo. At this time, they were assisted by R. Govardhanam, G. K. Venkatesh, Shankar–Ganesh and Henry Daniel and used Pattom Sadan for vocal and sound effects.

=== Other collaborations ===
Viswanathan and Ramamoorthy, particularly Viswanathan, are credited with moulding the careers of their regular singers T. M. Soundararajan, P. Susheela, P. B. Sreenivas, Seerkazhi Govindarajan and L. R. Eswari. A. L. Raghavan and S. Janaki sang less often for them.

K. J. Yesudas had his only collaboration with the duo in two songs from Kadhalikka Neramillai (1964): "Nenjathai Alli Alli" with L. R. Eswari and P. Susheela and "Enna Paarvai Undhan Paarvai" with P. Susheela. After the partnership dissolved, he sang with Viswanathan and Ramamoorthy separately.

During their early years, they worked with established male singers such as Thiruchi Loganathan, C. S. Jayaraman, S. C. Krishnan, Ghantasala and V. N. Sundaram. The female singers were P. A. Periyanayaki, M. L. Vasanthakumari, R. Balasaraswathi Devi, P. Leela, Jikki, T. V. Rathnam, T. S. Bagavathi, M. S. Rajeswari, K. Jamuna Rani, K. Rani, A. P. Komala and A. G. Rathnamala.

The singing actors N. S. Krishnan, T. A. Madhuram, V. Nagayya, T. R. Mahalingam, K. R. Ramasamy, J. P. Chandrababu, P. Bhanumathi and S. Varalakshmi also sang for the duo. G. K. Venkatesh, M. S. Viswanathan's friend and assistant, sang a few songs as well.

T. M. Soundararajan was Viswanathan's favourite singer and Jikki, followed by P. Susheela, were the duo's primary female singers. They were divided on A. M. Rajah; although Ramamoorthy favoured him, Viswanathan had a personality conflict dating back to Genova. Rajah sang only five Viswanathan–Ramamoorthy songs, at the height of his career during the 1950s. He voiced Gemini Ganesan, the actor for whom he was the primary voice, only in Padhi Bhakti.

P. Leela, Seerkazhi Govindarajan, Udutha Sarojini, K. Jamuna Rani, M. S. Rajeswari and A. L. Raghavan owe their 1950s and 1960s vocal success primarily to the duo, particularly to Viswanathan. Directors such as B. R. Panthulu, B. S. Ranga, Krishnan–Panju, A. Bhimsingh, P. Madhavan, C. V. Sridhar, T. R. Ramanna and A. C. Tirulokchandar worked with Viswanathan–Ramamoorthy frequently until 1965. K. Balachander never worked with the duo, preferring to work with Viswanathan alone even before the split.

=== Mellisai Mannargal ===
On 16 June 1963, Viswanathan and Ramamoorthy were given the title of Mellisai Mannargal (Tamil: மெல்லிசை மன்னர்கள், Kings of Light Music) by Sivaji Ganesan at a Madras Triplicane Cultural Academy ceremony sponsored by T. M. Ramachandran, director C. V. Sridhar and Chitralaya Gobu of the Hindu Group of Publications.

=== Split ===
Viswanathan and Ramamoorthy split up after the release of Aayirathil Oruvan on 9 July 1965. They composed for films separately, with the assistants remaining with Viswanathan. Although producer-directors T. R. Ramanna and A. Bhimsingh were saddened by the development, they worked with both men individually.

The split was the result of interpersonal issues. In 1964, C. V. Sridhar directed Kalai Kovil, starring S. V. Subbaiah, R. Muthuraman, Chandrakantha, Nagesh, V. Gopalakrishnan and V. S. Raghavan; Viswanathan and Ramamoorthy produced the film and composed its music. The film and its songs were unsuccessful, and a Kalki article was critical. Disagreement between the composers worsened by Server Sundaram, starring Nagesh, R. Muthuraman and K. R. Vijaya, which was released at the end of 1964. Viswanathan and Ramamoorthy were scheduled to shoot a scene suggested by Bollywood music director Naushad Ali to producer A. V. Meiyappa Chettiar; Ramamoorthy could not appear, and after completing Aayirathil Oruvan the duo announced their split.

In his solo career, Viswanathan composed music for over 700 films from 1965 to 2015. Ramamoorthy was less successful, composing for 19 films from 1966 to 1986. Viswanathan, the highest-paid music director from 1965 to 1985 but faced competition from next generation music composers like Ilayaraja in 1980s and AR Rahman in 1990s but continued to compose until 1998 in Tamil, Malayalam, Telugu films. After a period he started composing devotional songs. He continued doing live orchestras from 1960s to 2015. He restarted composing songs for albums and films from 2000 until 2015.

=== Reunion ===
Viswanathan and Ramamoorthy briefly reunited in 1995 for the unsuccessful Tamil film Engirundho Vandhan, starring Sathyaraj and Roja. It was the remake of the megahit Malayalam film Chithram. The film was a box office disaster and the songs went unnoticed. It was also their last film together. They received honorary doctorates from Sathyabama University in September 2006.

=== Thirai Isai Chakravarthy ===
In August 2012, the then Chief Minister of Tamil Nadu J.Jayalalithaa gave Viswanathan and Ramamoorthy the title of Thirai Isai Chakravarthy (Tamil: திரை இசை சக்ரவர்த்தி, Emperors of Cine Music).

== Deaths ==
Ramamoorthy died in a Chennai hospital after a brief illness on 17 April 2013 at age 91. On 27 June 2015, Viswanathan was admitted to Fortis Malar Hospital in Chennai with respiratory difficulty and died there at 4:15 a.m. on 14 July.

== Filmography ==
S. No	Count By Year	Year	Film	Language	Director	Banner	Note
1	1	1952	Panam	Tamil	N. S. Krishnan	Madras Pictures	
2	4	1953	Ammalakkalu	Telugu	D. Yoganand	Krishna Pictures	Along with C. R. Subbaraman
3	4	1953	Marumagal	Tamil	D. Yoganand	Krishna Pictures	Along with C. R. Subbaraman
4	4	1953	Devadasu	Telugu	Vedantam Raghavayya	Vinodha Pictures	Background Score
5	4	1953	Devadas	Tamil	Vedantam Raghavayya	Vinodha Pictures	Background Score
6	6	1954	Sorgavasal	Tamil	A. Kasilingam	Parimalam Pictures	
7	6	1954	Praja Rajyam	Telugu	A. Kasilingam	Parimalam Pictures	
8	6	1954	Sugam Enge	Tamil	K. Ramnoth	Modern Theatres	
9	6	1954	Maa Gopi	Telugu	B. S. Ranga	Vikram Productions	
10	6	1954	Vaira Maalai	Tamil	N. Jagannath	Vaidhya Films	
11	6	1954	Ratha Kanneer	Tamil	Krishnan–Panju	National Pictures	Background Score
12	7	1955	Kaveri	Tamil	D. Yoganand	Krishna Pictures	Co-music director G. Ramanathan
13	7	1955	Jaya Gopi	Tamil	B. S. Ranga	Vikram Productions	
14	7	1955	Porter Kandan	Tamil	K. Vembu	Narasu Studios	
15	7	1955	Vijaya Gauri	Telugu	D. Yoganand	Krishna Pictures	Co-music director G. Ramanathan
16	7	1955	Gulebakavali	Tamil	T. R. Ramanna	R. R. Pictures	
17	7	1955	Needhipathi	Tamil	A. S. A. Sami	Vijaya Films	
18	7	1955	Santhosham	Telugu	C. P. Dixit	Jupiter Pictures	
19	3	1956	Paasavalai	Tamil	A. S. Nagarajan	Modern Theatres	
20	3	1956	Tenali Ramakrishna	Telugu	B. S. Ranga	Vikram Productions	
21	3	1956	Tenali Raman	Tamil	B. S. Ranga	Vikram Productions	
22	8	1957	Bhaktha Markandeya	Tamil	B. S. Ranga	Vikram Productions	
23	8	1957	Bhaktha Markandeya	Telugu	B. S. Ranga	Vikram Productions	
24	8	1957	Bhaktha Markandeya	Kannada	B. S. Ranga	Vikram Productions	
25	8	1957	Mahadhevi	Tamil	Sundar Rao Nadkarni	Sri Ganesh Movietone	
26	8	1957	Pathini Deivam	Tamil	Ch. Narayana Murthy	VRV Productions	
27	8	1957	Pudhaiyal	Tamil	Krishnan–Panju	Kamal Brothers	
28	8	1957	Kudumba Gouravam	Tamil	B. S. Ranga	Vikram Productions	
29	8	1957	Kutumba Gowravam	Telugu	B. S. Ranga	Vikram Productions	
30	6	1958	Maalaiyitta Mangai	Tamil	G. R. Nathan	Kannadasan Films	
31	6	1958	Mahadhevi	Telugu	Sundar Rao Nadkarni	Sri Ganesh Movietone	co-music director A. M. Rajah
32	6	1958	Padhi Bhakti	Tamil	A. Bhim Singh	Buddha Pictures	
33	6	1958	Padhi Bhakti	Telugu	A. Bhim Singh	Buddha Pictures	co-music director T. Chalapathi Rao
34	6	1958	Petra Maganai Vitra Annai	Tamil	T. R. Sundaram	Modern Theatres	
35	6	1958	Lilly	Malayalam	F. Nagoor	HT Pictures	
36	7	1959	Amudhavalli	Tamil	A. K. Sekhar	Jupiter Pictures	
37	7	1959	Bhaaga Pirivinai	Tamil	A. Bhim Singh	Saravana Films	
38	7	1959	Raja Malaiya Simman	Tamil	B. S. Ranga	Vikram Productions	
39	7	1959	Raja Malaya Simha	Telugu	B. S. Ranga	Vikram Productions	
40	7	1959	Sivagangai Seemai	Tamil	K. Shankar	Kannadasan Films	
41	7	1959	Thalai Koduthaan Thambi	Tamil	T. R. Sundaram	Modern Theatres	
42	7	1959	Thanga Padhumai	Tamil	A. S. A. Samy	Jupiter Pictures	
43	5	1960	Aalukkoru Veedu	Tamil	M. Krishnan	Subash Movies	
44	5	1960	Kavalai Illaadha Manithan	Tamil	K. Shankar	Kannadasan Productions	
45	5	1960	Mannathi Mannan	Tamil	M. Natesan	Natesh Art Pictures	
46	5	1960	Ondrupattal Undu Vazhvu	Tamil	T. R. Ramanna	Ranga Pictures	
47	5	1960	Rathinapuri Ilavarasi	Tamil	T. R. Ramanna	Sri Vinayaga Pictures	
48	7	1961	Bhagyalakshmi	Tamil	K. V. Sreenivasan	Kanaka Films	
49	7	1961	Manapanthal	Tamil	T. R. Ramanna	RR Pictures	
50	7	1961	Palum Pazhamum	Tamil	A. Bhim Singh	Saravana Films	
51	7	1961	Pasamalar	Tamil	A. Bhim Singh	Rajamani Films	
52	7	1961	Intiki Deepam Illale	Telugu	T. R. Ramanna	RR Pictures	
53	7	1961	Pava Mannippu	Tamil	A. Bhim Singh	Buddha Pictures	
54	7	1961	Vijayanagarada Veeraputra	Kannada	R. Nagendra Rao	RNR Pictures	
55	20	1962	Alayamani	Tamil	K. Shankar	PSV Pictures	
56	20	1962	Bale Pandiya	Tamil	B. R. Panthulu	Padmini Pictures	
57	20	1962	Bandha Pasam	Tamil	A. Bhim Singh	Santhi Films	
58	20	1962	Kaathiruntha Kangal	Tamil	T. Prakash Rao	Vasumathi Pictures	
59	20	1962	Aasha Jeevulu	Telugu	B. S. Ranga	Vikram Productions	
60	20	1962	Thendral Veesum	Tamil	B. S. Ranga	Vikram Productions	
61	20	1962	Nenjil Or Aalayam	Tamil	C. V. Sridhar	Chithralaya	
62	20	1962	Nichaya Thaamboolam	Tamil	B. S. Ranga	Vikram Productions	
63	20	1962	Pelli Thambulam	Telugu	B. S. Ranga	Vikram Productions	
64	20	1962	Paadha Kannikkai	Tamil	K. Shankar	Saravana Films	
65	20	1962	Padithaal Mattum Podhuma	Tamil	A. Bhim Singh	Ranganathan Pictures	
66	20	1962	Paarthaal Pasi Theerum	Tamil	A. Bhim Singh	AVM Productions	
67	20	1962	Pavitra Prema	Telugu	A. Bhim Singh	AVM Productions	co-music director R. Sudarsanam
68	20	1962	Paasam	Tamil	T. R. Ramanna	RR Pictures	
69	20	1962	Policekaran Magal	Tamil	C. V. Sridhar	Chithrakala Pictures	
70	20	1962	Prayaschittam	Telugu	A. Bhimsingh	Saravana Films	co-music director G. K. Venkatesh
71	20	1962	Senthamarai	Tamil	A. Bhim Singh	ALS Productions	
72	20	1962	Sumaithaangi	Tamil	C. V. Sridhar	Visalakshi Productions	
73	20	1962	Veerathirumagan	Tamil	A. C. Tirulokchandar	Murugan Brothers	
74	20	1962	Prajasakthi	Telugu	A. C. Tirulokchandar	Murugan Brothers	
75	11	1963	Anandha Jodhi	Tamil	V. N. Reddy & A. S. A. Samy	Hariharan Films	
76	11	1963	Idhayathil Nee	Tamil	Mukta V. Srinivasan	Muktha Films	
77	11	1963	Idhu Sathiyam	Tamil	K. Shankar	Saravana Films	
78	11	1963	Karpagam	Tamil	K. S. Gopalakrishnan	Amarjothi Movies	
79	11	1963	Mani Osai	Tamil	P. Madhavan	ALS Productions	
80	11	1963	Nenjam Marappathillai	Tamil	C. V. Sridhar	Manohar Pictures	
81	11	1963	Paar Magale Paar	Tamil	A. Bhim Singh	Kasthuri Films	
82	11	1963	Panathottam	Tamil	K. Shankar	Saravana Films	
83	11	1963	Periya Idathu Penn	Tamil	T. R. Ramanna	RR Pictures	
84	11	1963	Manchi Chedu	Telugu	T. R. Ramanna	RR Pictures	
85	11	1963	Vijayanagara Veeraputhruni Katha	Telugu	R. Nagendra Rao	RNR Pictures	co-music director G. K. Venkatesh
86	15	1964	Andavan Kattalai	Tamil	K. Shankar	PSV Pictures	
87	15	1964	Dheiva Thaai	Tamil	P. Madhavan	Sathya Movies	
88	15	1964	En Kadamai	Tamil	M. Natesan	Natesh Art Pictures	
89	15	1964	Kai Koduttha Dheivam	Tamil	K. S. Gopalakrishnan	Sri Ponni Productions	
90	15	1964	Kalai Kovil	Tamil	C. V. Sridhar	Bhagyalakshmi Pictures	
91	15	1964	Karnan	Tamil	B. R. Panthulu	Padmini Pictures	
92	15	1964	Karuppu Panam	Tamil	G. R. Nathan	Visalakshi Films	
93	15	1964	Kavala Pillalu	Telugu	A. Bhim Singh	Kasthuri Films	
94	15	1964	Kaadhalikka Neramillai	Tamil	C. V. Sridhar	Chithralaya	
95	15	1964	Pachai Vilakku	Tamil	A. Bhim Singh	Vel Pictures	
96	15	1964	Padagotti	Tamil	T. Prakash Rao	Saravana Films	
97	15	1964	Panakkara Kudumbam	Tamil	T. R. Ramanna	RR Pictures	
98	15	1964	Puthiya Paravai	Tamil	Dada Mirasi	Sivaji Productions	
99	15	1964	Server Sundaram	Tamil	Krishnan–Panju	AVM Productions	
100	15	1964	Vazhkai Vazhvatharke	Tamil	Krishnan–Panju	Kamal Brothers	
101	13	1965	Aada Brathuku	Telugu	Vedantam Raghavayya	Gemini Studios	
102	13	1965	Panchavarna Kili	Tamil	K. Shankar	Saravana Films	
103	13	1965	Enga Veettu Pillai	Tamil	Chanakya	Vijaya Productions	
104	13	1965	Hello Mister Zamindar	Tamil	K. J. Mahadevan	Sudharsanam Pictures	
105	13	1965	Panam Padaithavan	Tamil	T. R. Ramanna	RR Pictures	
106	13	1965	Pazhani	Tamil	A. Bhim Singh	Bharatha Matha Pictures	
107	13	1965	Poojaikku Vandha Malar	Tamil	Mukta V. Srinivasan	Muktha Films	
108	13	1965	Santhi	Tamil	A. Bhim Singh	ALS Productions	
109	13	1965	Vaazhkai Padagu	Tamil	S. S. Vasan	Gemini Studios	
110	13	1965	Vennira Aadai	Tamil	C. V. Sridhar	Chithralaya	
111	13	1965	Maganey Kel	Tamil	Mukta V. Srinivasan	Naaval Films	
112	13	1965	Singapore CID	Telugu	Dada Mirasi	Sivaji Films	co-music director Pamarthi
113	13	1965	Aayirathil Oruvan	Tamil	B. R. Panthulu	Padmini Pictures	
114	2	1966	Server Sundaram	Telugu	Krishnan–Panju	AVM Productions	co-music director Pamarthi
115	2	1966	Madras to Pondicherry	Tamil	Thirumalai–Mahalingam	Sri Venkateswara Cinetone	solo composition
116	1	1995	Engirundho Vandhan	Tamil	Santhana Bharathi	VSR Pictures	
