= Panam (film) =

- Theatrical release poster
- Directed by: N. S. Krishnan
- Screenplay by: M. Karunanidhi
- Story by: N. V. Babu
- Produced by: A. L. Srinivasan
- Starring: Sivaji Ganesan; Padmini
- Cinematography: C. J. Mohan
- Edited by: Devarasan
- Music by: Viswanathan–Ramamoorthy
- Production company: Madras Pictures
- Release date: 27 December 1952
- Country: India
- Language: Tamil

Panam (transl. Money) is a 1952 Indian Tamil-language film, directed by N. S. Krishnan and written by M. Karunanidhi from a story by N. V. Babu. The film stars Sivaji Ganesan, N. S. Krishnan, B. R. Panthulu and Padmini. It was the first of the many collaborations between Ganesan and Padmini. The film was released on 27 December 1952.

== Cast ==
Male cast

- Sivaji Ganesan as Umapathy
- N. S. Krishnan as Durai
- B. R. Panthulu as Kanthasamy
- M. R. Saminathan
- V. K. Ramasamy as Gurunatha Pillai
- T. K. Ramachandran as Inspector Eswaran
- C. S. Pandian
- S. S. Rajendran as Sundaram
- K. A. Thangavelu as Aadiyapatham

Female cast

- Padmini as Jeeva
- T. A. Mathuram as Nallamma
- V. Susheela
- S. D. Subbulakshmi
- Chandra, Dhanam

Dance

- Girjia
- Ambujam
- Mohana

== Soundtrack ==
The music was composed by Viswanathan–Ramamoorthy, in their debut.

Song	Singers	Lyrics	Length
"Engae Theduvaen Engae Theduven"	N. S. Krishnan	Kannadasan	02:21
"Kudumbatthin Vilakku"	M. L. Vasanthakumari	Kannadasan	02:28
"Theena Moona Kaana"	N. S. Krishnan	Kannadasan	01:41
"Idhayatthai Irumbakki...Manamudaiyorai Manidhargal Ennum"	T. V. Rathnam	Kannadasan	02:02
"Aanukkor Needhi Pennukkor Needhi"	T. A. Madhuram	Kannadasan	02:01
"En Vaazhvil Pudhu Paadama"	Radha Jayalakshmi	Kannadasan	02:02
"Ezhai Nin Kovilai"	M. L. Vasanthakumari & G. K. Venkatesh	Kannadasan	03:30
"Panathinaale Manusharoda"	C. S. Jayaraman	Kannadasan	03:40
"Ngoppanai Kette Mudippenn"	C. S. Pandian	Kannadasan	01:07
"Maanatthodu Vaazhvom"	N. S. Krishnan & (Radha) Jayalakshmi	Kannadasan	02:33
"Pasiyendru Vandhaal"		Bharathidasan	
