= Bhagyalakshmi (1961 film) =

1961 film

- Theatrical release poster
- Directed by: K. V. Srinivasan
- Written by: K. V. Srinivasan
- Produced by: Pattanna
- Starring: Gemini Ganesan; Sowcar Janaki
- Cinematography: G. Balakrishna
- Edited by: S. R. Chandrasekaran; K. A. Sriramulu
- Music by: Viswanathan–Ramamoorthy
- Production company: Narayanan Company
- Release date: 7 November 1961
- Running time: 2:58:19 (16049 ft.)
- Country: India
- Language: Tamil

Bhagyalakshmi is a 1961 Indian Tamil-language film written and directed by K. V. Srinivasan. The film stars Gemini Ganesan and Sowcar Janaki. It was released on 7 November 1961.

== Plot ==
Kamala, a young widow and a victim of child marriage, and Radha are best friends. When Radha marries Sunder, Kamala moves in with them. When Kamala comes across a photograph, that hints that her husband may be alive, it changes her life forever.

== Cast ==
The list was adapted from the film's credits

Male cast

- Gemini Ganesan as Dr.Sundar
- K. A. Thangavelu as Velu
- K. Natarajan as Damodaram
- Karikol Raju
- Balakrishnan
- Master Sridhar as Gopi
- V. Nagayya (Guest)
- Friend Ramasami (Guest)

Female cast

- Sowcar Janaki as Kamala
- E. V. Saroja as Radha
- P. Kannamba as Parvathi
- M. Saroja as Sulukku Sundari
- C. K. Saraswathi as Virunthali Athai
- M. Radhabai as Annapoorani
- S. N. Lakshmi
- Baby Savithri as Geetha

== Production ==
The film was produced by Pattanna under the banner Narayanan Company and was directed by K. V. Srinivasan. Cinematography was handled by G. Balakrishna while the editing was done by S. R. Chandrasekaran and K. A. Sriramulu. A. K. Sekar was in charge of art direction. Choreography was done by Chinni — Sampath, K. Thangappan and Thangaraj. T. S. Rangasamy was in charge of audiography. Still photography was done by N. Ramachar and Jeeva. The film was made at Majestic, Narasu and Prasath (for outdoor) studios and processed at Gemini laboratory.

== Soundtrack ==
Music was composed by the duo Viswanathan–Ramamoorthy. The song "Maalai Pozhudhin" was a chartbuster and was based on Chandrakauns raga. Veena was played by R. Pichumani Iyer. The song "Singara Solaiye" was originally written as "Kalloori Ranikaal" and was released in the records. Since the censor board objected to the wording, it was changed in the film.

Song	Singer/s	Lyricist	Length
"Singara Solaiye Ullasa Velaiye"	A. L. Raghavan & K. Jamuna Rani	Kannadasan	04:54
"Kaadhalendraal Aanum Pennum"	A. L. Raghavan & P. Susheela	Kannadasan	03:50
"Kaadhalenum Vadivam Kanden"	P. Susheela	Kannadasan	03:23
"Maalai Pozhuthin Mayakkathile"	P. Susheela	Kannadasan	04:26
"Kaana Vandha Kaatchiyenna"	P. Susheela	Kannadasan	03:26
"Kanne Raja Kavalai Vendaam"	P. Susheela	Kannadasan	03:18
"Paartheeraa Aiyaa Paartheera"	S. C. Krishnan & L. R. Eswari	Kannadasan	02:30
"Ammaa Ammaa Kavalai Vendaam"	Renuka	Kannadasan	02:56
"Varalakshmi Varuvaayammaa"	Jayalakshmi	V. Seetharaman	03:09
"Palingu Manappandhalile"	Jayalakshmi	Papanasam Sivan	01:09
"Ennai Naan Ariyaatha Chinna Vayasile"	P. Susheela	Papanasam Sivan	02:12

== Critical reception ==
Kandhan of Kalki felt Gemini Ganesan did not perform well and his characterisation was vague but praised Janaki's acting and the songs.
