= Pasavalai =

1956 Indian Tamil-Language film

- Theatrical release poster
- Directed by: A. S. Nagarajan
- Written by: Pa. Kannan (dialogues)
- Screenplay by: A. S. Nagarajan
- Produced by: T. R. Sundaram
- Starring: M. K. Radha; V. Gopalakrishnan; G. Varalakshmi; M. N. Rajam
- Cinematography: W. R. Subbha Rao
- Edited by: L. Balu
- Music by: Viswanathan–Ramamoorthy
- Production company: Modern Theatres
- Release date: 1 November 1956
- Running time: 146 minutes
- Country: India
- Language: Tamil

Pasavalai (transl. Net of Love) is a 1956 Indian Tamil-language historical fantasy film, directed by A. S. Nagarajan produced by T. R. Sundaram of Modern Theatres, and written by Pa. Kannan. The music was composed by Viswanathan–Ramamoorthy. It stars M. K. Radha, V. Gopalakrishnan, G. Varalakshmi, M. N. Rajam and Kumari Rajamani, with T. P. Muthulakshmi and A. Karunanidhi providing comic relief. It was released on 1 November 1956. The film was a moderate success at the box office.

== Cast ==
Male cast

- M. K. Radha
- V. K. Ramasamy
- V. Gopalakrishnan
- A. Karunanidhi
- S. M. Thirupathisami
- M. N. Krishnan
- M. R. Santhanam
- K. Natarajan
- Sairam
- Master Bhaji
- Master Venkatesh
- Sundararajan

Female cast

- G. Varalakshmi
- M. N. Rajam
- Kumari Rajamani
- T. P. Muthulakshmi
- Bhagyam
- T. K. Rajeswari
- Tiger (Dog)

Dance

- E. V. Saroja

== Soundtrack ==
Music by Viswanathan–Ramamoorthy. Many songs become popular, such as "Anbinaal... Paasavalai", sung by C. S. Jayaraman and "Lol Lol Machchaan Unna Parthu", sung by Jikki.

Songs	Singer	Lyrics	Length
"Machchan Unna Parthu" (Lol Lol Lol)	Jikki	Pattukkottai Kalyanasundaram	04:48
"Anbinale Undaagum Inbanilai" 1	C. S. Jayaraman	Pattukkottai Kalyanasundaram	03:15
"Idhuthaan Ulagamadaa Manidhaa"	C. S. Jayaraman	Pattukkottai Kalyanasundaram	03:24
"Intha Aattukkum Namma Naatukkum"	C. S. Jayaraman	Pattukkottai Kalyanasundaram	03:44
"Anbinale Undaagum Inbanilai" 2	C. S. Jayaraman	Pattukkottai Kalyanasundaram	04:32
"Aiyaiya Neenga Ambalaiyaanga"	Thiruchi Loganathan & K. Rani	A. Maruthakasi	03:22
"Chinna Ponnu Singaari Naan"	P. Suseela	A. Maruthakasi	03:17
"Mathippu Ketta Maamaa Nee Vaalai Aatalaamaa"	P. Suseela	A. Maruthakasi	02:43
"Yaarukku Theengu Seithen.... Kannil Illaiyo Manam Illaiyo"	C. S. Jayaraman	A. Maruthakasi	03:53
"Kutti Aadu Thappivandhaal....Unakedhu Sondham"	C. S. Jayaraman	Pattukottai Kalyanasundaram	03:33
"Malarodu Vishanaagam.... Needhi Idhuthaanaa"	P. B. Srinivas		02:45
