= Visalur =

- village
- Country: India
- State: Tamil Nadu
- District: Thanjavur

Languages
  - Official: Tamil
- Time zone: UTC+5:30 (IST)

Visalur is a village in the Kumbakonam taluk of Thanjavur district, Tamil Nadu.

== Demographics ==
As per the 2001 census, Agarathur had a total population of 2017 with 1036 males and 981 females. The sex ratio was 947. The literacy rate was 67.69.
