= Bhaktha Markandeya =

- Poster in Tamil
- Directed by: B. S. Ranga
- Screenplay by: Thuraiyur Moorthi (Tamil); Chi Sadashivaiah (Kannada)
- Produced by: B. S. Ranga
- Edited by: P. G. Mohan; M. Devendranathan
- Music by: Viswanathan–Ramamoorthy
- Production company: Vikram Pictures
- Distributed by: Rajasri Pictures (Tamil Nadu); Vikram Pictures (Bangalore and Mysore)
- Release date: 2 January 1957
- Country: India
- Languages: Tamil; Kannada

Bhakta Markandeya is an Indian film simultaneously made in Tamil and Kannada languages and directed by B. S. Ranga with a different supporting cast in each version. Master Anand played the title role of Markandeya in both versions. The film was released in 1957.

== Plot ==
The theme of the story is the nullification of the powers of Yama (Hindu god of death) by Shiva.

Lord Shiva blesses sage Mrukanda Maharshi and his wife with a child. Their child, Markandeya, was given a lease of 16 years to live in this world. But the child worships Lord Shiva with unlimited Bhakthi (devotion). When he completes 16 years of age, Yama comes to take his life as appointed. Markandeya grips the Shivalinga and Lord Shiva appears before Yama and tells him not to take Markandeya's life, because he (Lord Shiva) has blessed the boy. So, Markandeya becomes an immortal. The moral of the story is that one who surrenders to God need not worry about death.

== Cast ==
- Master Anand as Markandeya
- V. Nagayya
- Pushpavalli
- Padmini Priyadarshini
- Surya Kala
- R. Nagendra Rao

=== Tamil ===
- K. A. Thangavelu
- Babuji
- Sairam
- Balasaraswathi
- Lakshmikantham
- Sundaram

=== Kannada ===
- T R Narasimha Raju
- Dikki Madhava Rao
- Comedian Guggu
- H R Hanumantha Rao
- B Ramadevi
- Raghuramaiah

== Soundtrack ==
Tamil songs

Music was composed by the duo Viswanathan–Ramamoorthy, while the lyrics were penned by A. Maruthakasi.

Song	Singers	Length
"Om Namaschivaaya"	V. Nagayya & P. Leela	03:00
"Thirumaalum Brammanum"	V. Nagayya & P. Leela	03:38
"Ulagamellaam"	V. N. Sundaram	
"Daevaadhi Dhaevaa"	V. N. Sundaram	05:35
"Aaduvadhum Paaduvadhum"	A. P. Komala	06:17
"Naragam Idhudhaan"	S. C. Krishnan & K. Jamuna Rani	
"Saaindhaadammaaa Saindhaadu"	P. Leela & Group	02:40
"Miyaav Miyaav Miyaav"	S. C. Krishnan	
"Unnai Nee Ennippaar"	Sivaraman	02:39
"Ulagin Muzhumudhalae"	T. Sathyavathi	03:06
"Iravaamal Ivvulagil"	T. Sathyavathi	
"Sivanae Unnaitthozudhu"	T. Sathyavathi	
"Anbin Uruvae Neeyae"	P. B. Sreenivas & Soolamangalam Rajalakshmi	03:09
"Oru Maanguyil"	P. Susheela	03:26
"Ingum Angum"	R. Balasaraswathi Devi	
"Andasaraasarangal"	Soolamangalam Rajalakshmi	

Kannada songs

The music was composed by Viswanathan–Ramamoorthy

Song
"Om Namaha Shivaya"
"Howdo Allavo Neeve Heli"
"Chenne Cheluve Baare"
" Jo Jo Kandaiah"
"Harahara Sundara Saambasadaashiva"
"Shivanalli Sharanagiranna"
"Shivane Bhayaharane"
"Ago Malligeyu Dumbiyanu"
"Ammana Golidu Kelisade"
"Nithya Nirmala Bhava"
