= Hello Mister Zamindar =

- Theatrical release poster
- Directed by: K. J. Mahadevan
- Story by: K. J. Mahadevan
- Dialogue by: Ve. Lakshmanan
- Produced by: K. J. Mahadevan
- Starring: Gemini Ganesan; Savitri
- Cinematography: V. Ramamoorthi
- Edited by: N. K. Gopal; N. P. Suresh
- Music by: Viswanathan–Ramamoorthy
- Production company: Sudharsanam Pictures
- Release date: 14 May 1965
- Running time: 139 minutes
- Country: India
- Language: Tamil

Hello Mister Zamindar is a 1965 Indian Tamil-language romantic comedy film, written, directed and produced by K. J. Mahadevan under the Sudharsanam Pictures banner. The dialogue was written by Ve. Lakshmanan. The music was by Viswanathan–Ramamoorthy. It stars Gemini Ganesan and Savitri. The film was released on 14 May 1965.

== Cast ==
Actors

- Gemini Ganesan as Sekar
- M. R. Radha as Azhagirisamy
- T. S. Balaiah as Zamin secretary
- V. Gopalakrishnan
- T. S. Muthaiah
- S. Rama Rao
- Ganapathi Bhutt
- Dakshinamurthi
- K. Natarajan
- A. Veerappan
- Murugan
- Das
- Velayudham
- G. G. Sharma
- Natarajan

Actresses

- Savitri as Radha/Sarasu
- K. R. Indira Devi as Chellaye
- K. S. Angamuthu
- Seethalakshmi
- Ramani
- Mallika
- Radhabhai
- Madhuri
- Omana
- Kumari Saroja
- Gomathi
- Rajamma

== Soundtrack ==
Music was by Viswanathan–Ramamoorthy and lyrics were written by Kannadasan. The title song was later played in the film Jackson Durai (2016).

Song	Singer	Length
"Sondhamum Ille Oru Bandhamum"	G. K. Venkatesh	03:12
"Ilamai Koluvirukkum Iyarkai" – Male	P. B. Srinivas	03:01
"Hello Mister Jameendar"	P. B. Srinivas, P. Susheela	03:25
"Ilamai Koluvirukkum Iyarkai" – Female	P. Susheela	02:55
"Kaadhal Nilave Kanmani Radha"	P. B. Srinivas	03:51
"Thottathil Poove"	P. Susheela	02:13
"Pattinikku Oru Manasu"	K. Jamuna Rani	03:03
"Kaadhal Nilave Kanmani Radha" – Sad	P. B. Srinivas	02:18

== Reception ==
Kalki appreciated Lakshmanan's dialogues, Kannadasan's lyrics and Mahadevan's direction.
