= Maganey Kel =

- Directed by: Mukta V. Srinivasan
- Screenplay by: Rama. Arangannal
- Produced by: Sundaram
- Starring: S. S. Rajendran; C. L. Anandan; Pushpalatha
- Music by: Viswanathan–Ramamoorthy
- Production company: Naaval Films
- Release date: 19 November 1965
- Country: India
- Language: Tamil

Maganey Kel (transl. Listen, my son) is a 1965 Indian Tamil language film directed by Mukta V. Srinivasan. Insider information from the director's son reveals that the movie was completed in 1958, but released seven years late, for some unexplained reasons. This is partially proved because lyricist Pattukottai Kalyanasundaram had died in 1959. The film stars S. S. Rajendran, C. L. Anandan, and Pushpalatha.

== Soundtrack ==
Music was composed by the duo Viswanathan–Ramamoorthy, while the lyrics were written by Pattukkottai Kalyanasundaram.

Song	Singer/s	Length
"Aararivil Orarivu Auttu"	T. M. Soundararajan	03:24
"Kalai Mangai Uruvam Kandu"	Seerkazhi Govindarajan & M. L. Vasanthakumari	03:02
"Manavaraiyil...Soothaattam Aaadum Kaalam"	T. M. Soundararajan & K. Jamuna Rani	03:21
"Mattamaana Pechu"	A. L. Raghavan & Jikki	03:23
"Oror Onnu Ulla Dheivam Onnu"	Seergazhi Govindarajan & Group	03:23
"Aattam Porandadhu Munnaale"	T. V. Rathnam	02:58
"Unnai Paartha Kangal Rendum"	A. M. Rajah & P. Susheela	03:31
"Kaanadha Inbam Thaanaagave Vandhaal"	P. Susheela	03:03
"Paruvam Vaadhudhu Inge"		
