= Idhayathil Nee =

1963 film by Muktha Srinivasan

- Poster
- Directed by: V. Srinivasan
- Screenplay by: V. Srinivasan
- Story by: Dharma Rajan; K. Devarajan (comedy dialogues)
- Produced by: V. Ramasamy
- Starring: Gemini Ganesan; Devika
- Cinematography: P. Ramasamy
- Edited by: T. Vijayarangam; Surya
- Music by: Viswanathan–Ramamoorthy
- Production company: Muktha Films
- Release date: 14 June 1963
- Running time: 160 minutes
- Country: India
- Language: Tamil

Idhayathil Nee (transl. You are in my heart) is 1963 Indian Tamil-language romance film, directed by V. Srinivasan and produced by V. Ramasamy. The film stars Gemini Ganesan and Devika. It was released on 14 June 1963.

== Cast ==
- Gemini Ganesan as Advocate Anandhan
- Devika as Radha
- M. R. Radha as Maari Muthu
- Lakshmi Rajyam as Kamala
- Nagesh as Arjunan
- K. A. Thangavelu as Kanmani, Anandhan's brother
- M. Saroja as Soodamani
- T. S. Muthaiah as Gopalakrishna Mudaliyar
- V. Gopalakrishnan as Shankar/Chinna Kannu
- Kumari Rukmani as Anandhan's Step Mother/Kanmani's mother
- Sattaampillai K. N.Venkatraman as Soodamani's father
- V. S. Raghavan as Nellaiyappan, Radha's grandpa

== Soundtrack ==
Music was composed by Viswanathan–Ramamoorthy.

Song	Singer	Lyrics	Length
"Poo Varaiyum"	P. B. Srinivas	Vaali	03:42
"Chithira Poovizhi"	P. Susheela L. R. Eswari	Mayavanathan	03:52
"Odivathu Pol Idai"	P. B. Srinivas P. Susheela	Vaali	03:34
"Thottathu Mappillai"	S. Janaki	Kannadasan	03:30
"Uravu Endroru"	P. Susheela	Vaali	03:35
"Yaar Sirithaal"	P. B. Srinivas	Vaali	03:41

== Release and reception ==
Idhayathil Nee was released on 14 June 1963. In Sport and Pastime, T. M. Ramachandran said the film is "so deplorable that every discriminating movie-goer will consider it a sheer waste of celluloid." Kanthan of Kalki wrote.
