= En Kadamai =

1964 film by M. Natesan

- Theatrical release poster
- Directed by: M. Natesan
- Written by: Ma. Ra.
- Produced by: M. Natesan
- Starring: M. G. Ramachandran; B. Saroja Devi
- Cinematography: R. Sampath
- Edited by: A. Murugesan
- Music by: Viswanathan–Ramamoorthy
- Production company: Natesh Art Pictures
- Distributed by: Emgeeyaar Pictures
- Release date: 13 March 1964
- Country: India
- Language: Tamil

En Kadamai (transl. My duty) is a 1964 Indian Tamil-language action thriller film, produced and directed by M. Natesan, and written by Ma. Ra. The film stars M. G. Ramachandran and B. Saroja Devi. It was released on 13 March 1964, and became a box-office bomb.

== Plot ==
Dharmalingam, a rich landlord, is the father of two sons and a daughter. His eldest son enters into a love marriage with a poor teacher's daughter, Kamala. Dharmalingam disowns them. The son dies, and Kamala is left homeless, with a little child. Nathan, a police inspector, gives Kamala shelter in his house and decides to help her fight her case for the property. But Kamala is murdered on her way to the court hearing. Fingers point at Dharmalingam and his son Shankar. Shankar and Nathan's sister Uma are in love. Nathan comes to investigate the case and falls in love with Dharmalingam's daughter Sarasu. Now, Nathan is in a dilemma over whether he should protect Shankar as he is his sister's sweetheart, or drop the case because he loves Dharmalingam's daughter.

== Cast ==
Male cast

- M. G. Ramachandran as Inspector Nathan
- K. Balaji as Ravi
- M. N. Nambiar as Shankar
- M. R. Radha as Dharmalingam
- Nagesh as Thrilokam

Female cast

- B. Saroja Devi as Sarasu
- L. Vijayalakshmi as Uma
- Manorama as Panchavarnam
- C. K. Saraswathi as Maragatham
- Susheela as Kamala

== Soundtrack ==
The soundtrack was composed by Viswanathan–Ramamoorthy (a duo consisting of M. S. Viswanathan and T. K. Ramamoorthy) with lyrics by Kannadasan.

Track listing
| No. | Title | Singer(s) | Length |
|---|---|---|---|
| 1. | "Thenodum Thanneren Meedhu" | P. Susheela | 4:01 |
| 2. | "Meene Meene Meenamma" | P. Susheela | 3:45 |
| 3. | "Yaaradhu Yaaradhu" | T. M. Soundararajan, P. Susheela | 4:52 |
| 4. | "Hello Miss Hello Miss" | T. M. Soundararajan | 4:11 |
| 5. | "Iravinile Enna Ninaippu" | P. Susheela | 4:52 |
| 6. | "Nilladi Nilladi Seemaatti" | T. M. Soundarrajan | 3:33 |
| Total length: | | | 25:14 |

== Release and reception ==
En Kadamai was released on 13 March 1964, and distributed by Emgeeyaar Pictures. T. M. Ramachandran of Sport and Pastime panned the film, calling the music its "saving grace". Playing on the film's title, Kanthan of Kalki said, "Ayyo, ennai kodumai!" (Oh god, what an atrocity!). En Kadamai was a box-office bomb; while many speculated this was due to it releasing shortly after M. G. Ramachandran resigned from the Madras Legislative Council, Ramachandran himself did not think so.
