= Santosham (1955 film) =

- Theatrical release poster
- Directed by: C. P. Deekshith
- Screenplay by: Samudrala Sr; Samudrala Jr.
- Based on: Velaikari by C. N. Annadurai
- Produced by: M. Somasundaram
- Starring: N. T. Rama Rao; Jaggayya; Anjali Devi; Jamuna
- Cinematography: P. Rama Swamy
- Edited by: L. S. Ramachandran
- Music by: Viswanathan–Ramamoorthy
- Production company: Jupiter Pictures
- Release dates: 24 December 1955 (Telugu); 1 January 1956 (Hindi)
- Running time: 159 minutes
- Country: India
- Languages: Telugu; Hindi

Santosham (transl. Happiness) is a 1955 Telugu-language drama film, produced by M. Somasundaram under the Jupiter Pictures banner and directed by C. P. Deekshith. The film stars N. T. Rama Rao, Jaggayya, Anjali Devi and Jamuna, with music composed by Viswanathan–Ramamoorthy. It is a remake of the Tamil film Velaikari (1949) and it was simultaneously made in Hindi as Naya Aadmi (1956) with Anwar Hussain replacing Jaggayya and Gope replacing Relangi, respectively.

== Plot ==
Sundaraiah (Vadlamani Viswanathan) is a poor man who took a loan from Dayanidhi for his son Anand's (N.T. Rama Rao) higher studies. Dayanidhi deceives him and eventually auctions off his home, resulting in Sundaraiah committing suicide.

Anand comes back to town, meets his childhood friend Madan Mohan (Jaggaiah), and is shocked to see his father dead. He reads the suicide note and realizes Dayanidhi's cruelty. He works an odd job for money, despite being a law graduate.

Anand is shocked to hear that the mother has arranged her son's marriage with Sarasa (Jamuna). Mohan persuades Anand to accept the proposal, and the marriage is performed. Mohan and Anand scheme a plan on how to seek revenge against Dayanidhi for Anand's father's death. Meanwhile, Sarasa is dismayed that Anand does not love her and dislikes his behavior.

Mohan and Anand seek to mentally torture Dayanidhi and reform him. One day, the two find out about the love affair between Dayanidhi's son Murthy (Ramasarma) and his servant-maid Amrutham (Anjali Devi). They relay this to Dayanidhi to cause a rift between the father and son. Dayanidhi argues with Murthy and is disheartened to hear that he wishes to marry Amrutham. Enraged, Dayanidhi tries to kill Amrutham by torching her hut. However, she is shifted out of town by Anand himself and ends up in a hospital. The hospital's doctor advises her to take shelter at an insane man Parvatalu's (Relangi) house while also curing him of his illness by acting as his daughter, and she accepts. Meanwhile, Anand and Mohan seek to ruin Dayanidhi's public reputation with cheap behavior. When Dayanidhi argues, Anand quits the house and forcibly takes Sarasa with him. He lives with Sarasa in a small house and makes her do all the household work to reform her.

Meanwhile, Murthy is disheartened to hear of Amrutham's supposed death and becomes a wanderer. He tangles with a fake-godman criminal, and in a fight, the criminal accidentally dies and Murthy is accused of murder. Anand permanently takes up a disguise to argue his case in court. Anand successfully gets Murthy acquitted. Anand also reunites Murthy with Amrutham who is now adopted by a cured Parvatalu, and seeks to perform their marriage. The proposal is accepted by Dayanidhi and the marriage takes place. At the wedding venue, police show up to arrest Dayanidhi for murdering Amrutham. Dayanidhi finally learns that money is not everything and tries to commit suicide but is stopped by Mohan and a disguised Anand. However, Anand produces Amrutham at the wedding venue and sends away the police. When Dayanidhi expresses his gratitude, Anand finally removes his disguise and reveals the truth. He shows everyone that Dayanidhi is a criminal and the culprit of his father's death, and wishes to leave now that he has completed his revenge. However, Dayanidhi expresses resentment and begs forgiveness. Sarasa also pleads the same and warms up to Anand. The film ends on a happy note with the reunion of the whole family.

== Cast ==
- N. T. Rama Rao as Anand & Paramanand
- Jaggayya as Mohan (Anwar Hussain in Hindi)
- Jamuna as Sarasa
- Anjali Devi as Amrutham
- R. Nagendra Rao as Dayanidhi
- Relangi as Parvathalu (Gope in Hindi)
- Vangara as Pullayya
- Chadalavada as Avatharam
- Vadlamani Viswanatham as Sundarayya
- Rama Sharma as Murthy
- K.V.S. Sharma as Public Prosecutor
- Rajasulochana as Santhi Kumar
- Rajaratnam as Radhabai
- Kamalabai as Gangaratnam
- Ragini as Dancer
- Helen as Dancer

== Production ==
Since Bombay-based director C.P. Deekshith didn't know Telugu, T. Hanumantharao assisted him as a dialogue director. The film was initially titled Andarikosam.

== Soundtrack ==
Santosham

Film score by Viswanathan–Ramamoorthy
- Released: 1955
- Genre: Soundtrack
- Label: His Master's Voice
- Producer: Viswanathan–Ramamoorthy

Music composed by Viswanathan–Ramamoorthy. Lyrics were written by Samudrala Sr-Samudrala Jr. The hit numbers include- "Theeyani Haayi Ee Reyi" and "Unnarunnarunnaru".

S. No.	Song title	Singers	length
1	"Navvavoi Raja"	P. Susheela	
2	"Nilupara"	Venkatesh	2:45
3	"Etula Brathukanu"	Ghantasala	2:15
4	"Yamuna Thatakam"	K. Rani	
5	"Gaalivalle Thelipo"		
6	"Rupai Kasulone"	P.Susheela	3:29
7	"Dhanamu Mulamura"	Ghantasala, Pithapuram	4:45
8	"Teeyani Eenati Reyi"	P.Susheela, Venkatesh	2:24
9	"Chinnaridanara"	P.Susheela	2:03
10	"Vunnaru Vunnaru"	P. Susheela	2:45

== Release ==
Both versions were released a week apart and both fared well.
