= Aayirathil Oruvan (1965 film) =

1965 film by B. R. Panthulu

- Theatrical release poster
- Directed by: B. R. Panthulu
- Screenplay by: K. J. Mahadevan
- Story by: K. J. Mahadevan
- Dialogue by: R. K. Shanmugam
- Produced by: B. R. Panthulu
- Starring: M. G. Ramachandran; Jayalalithaa
- Cinematography: V. Ramamoorthy
- Edited by: R. Devarajan
- Music by: Viswanathan–Ramamoorthy
- Production company: Padmini Pictures
- Release date: 9 July 1965
- Running time: 167–174 minutes (Note: While G. Dhananjayan in his book The Best of Tamil Cinema gives the runtime as 167 minutes, Ashish Rajadhyaksha and Paul Willemen in Encyclopaedia of Indian Cinema give it as 174 minutes.)
- Country: India
- Language: Tamil

Aayirathil Oruvan (transl. One in a Thousand) is a 1965 Indian Tamil-language swashbuckler film produced and directed by B. R. Panthulu. The film stars M. G. Ramachandran and Jayalalithaa, with M. N. Nambiar, Manohar, Nagesh, S. V. Ramadas, Vijayalakshmi and Madhavi in supporting roles. It revolves around a doctor who is sold into slavery for rebelling against the dictator of his nation, and later forced into a life of piracy.

Aayirathil Oruvan was inspired by many pirate films, particularly Captain Blood (1935), and was Ramachandran's first with Panthulu. It was also the first of many collaborations between Ramachandran and Jayalalithaa. The story and screenplay were written by K. J. Mahadevan, and the dialogues by R. K. Shanmugham. The cinematography was handled by V. Ramamoorthy, and editing by R. Devarajan. The film was shot primarily in Karwar.

Aayirathil Oruvan was released on 9 July 1965. The film emerged as a critical and commercial success, running for more than 150 days in theatres. It was a milestone for both Ramachandran and Jayalalithaa, cementing the former's image as an onscreen "do-gooder" among the general public, and helping the latter enter politics. A digitised version of the film was released in 2014 and also became a success, running for over 175 days.

== Plot ==
Manimaran is a doctor living in the country of Neidhal Naadu with his sidekick Azhaga. He helps cure the illness of one of the rebels against the dictator of Neidhal Naadu. The ruler's guards arrest the rebels, along with Manimaran for helping them. Manimaran and the rebels are sold as slaves by the ruler to a nearby island called Kanni Theevu (Virgin Islands), ruled by Sengappan. Manimaran leads the slaves and fights for their rights.

Poongodi, the princess of Kanni Theevu and niece of Sengappan, the guardian of the orphaned princess, falls in love with Manimaran at first sight. Simultaneously, her servant Thenmozhi falls for Azhaga, after initial arguments. Despite the differences between Poongodi and Manimaran, Poongodi tries to woo him on many occasions. She even offers freedom from slavery only to him, who rejects the offer demanding freedom for all of the slaves. Meanwhile, the island is attacked by pirates headed by a captain. As Sengappan's troops are out of the island on another assignment, Sengappan pleads with Manimaran and the other slaves to help him. Manimaran demands freedom slavery in return for fighting the pirates, only to be betrayed later.

The slaves make an escape plan of their own and successfully take over the pirate ship, with whom they fought earlier. Manimaran tells the pirate captain about their plight and asks him to help them reach Neidhal Naadu. The captain seemingly agrees, while actually taking them to his pirate island and holds them captive. He coerces them to work for him as pirates, or Manimaran will see all of his other men die. With no other option, Manimaran assents for the safety of his men.

During one of his pirate hunts, Manimaran finds Sengappan and Poongodi. He brings Poongodi to the pirate island and tries to hide her from the pirate captain, but the pirate captain soon finds out. As per the island's policy, any treasure pirated must be auctioned, and so Poongodi is also auctioned. Manimaran bids the highest, buys her, and keeps her with him. Manimaran marries Poongodi, and as per the pirate island's laws, the pirate captain cannot attempt to separate a married couple. He attempts to take Poongodi by force, gets defeated by Manimaran in a sword fight, and reforms. He accompanies the slaves led by Manimaran, to achieve their goal of freeing Neidhal Naadu. In the ensuing war, the dictator is defeated but tricks into arresting them instead. However, in his court, the dictator begs Manimaran to take over the throne. Manimaran politely refuses, citing his intention to continue his work as a doctor, serving the people.

== Cast ==
Male cast

- M. G. Ramachandran as Manimaran
- M. N. Nambiar as the pirate captain
- R. S. Manohar as the dictator of Neidhal Naadu
- S. V. Ramadas as Sengappan
- Nagesh as Azhaga

Female cast

- Jayalalithaa as Poongodi
- Vijayalakshmi as the pirate queen
- Madhavi as Thenmozhi

== Production ==
After producing and directing films like Veerapandiya Kattabomman (1959), Kappalottiya Thamizhan (1961) and Karnan (1964), B. R. Panthulu was in debt since they did not perform well commercially or recover their costs. He later approached M. G. Ramachandran and sought his help to recover from those losses. Panthulu was adamant that Ramachandran act in his film or he would shelve it as he considered the storyline tailormade for him. Ramachandran agreed, and this laid the foundation for Aayirathil Oruvan. The story and screenplay were written by K. J. Mahadevan, and the dialogues by R. K. Shanmugham. The film was inspired by many pirate films such as Captain Blood (1935), The Crimson Pirate (1952) and The Black Pirate (1926). It was Ramachandran's first film with Panthulu, and the-then newcomer Jayalalithaa. Panthulu signed on Jayalalithaa after being impressed with the "rushes" of her performance in his own film Chinnada Gombe (1964). Ramachandran was paid ₹23,500 for acting in the film. Shooting for some fight scenes and ship transportation scenes took place in Karwar.

== Soundtrack ==
The soundtrack was composed by Viswanathan–Ramamoorthy, a duo consisting of M. S. Viswanathan and T. K. Ramamoorthy. It was the last film where they worked together until Engirundho Vandhan (1995). The song "Unnai Naan" is set in Shubhapantuvarali raga. The song "Atho Andha Paravai" remains one of the most popular songs from the film. It was remixed and featured in the 2010 film Aayirathil Oruvan, unrelated to its 1965 namesake. The song was remixed by D. Imman in Madrasi (2006). The song "Naanamo" was remixed by Bharadwaj as "Rosemary" in Pallikoodam (2007).

Track listing
No.	Title	Lyrics	Singer(s)	Length
1.	"Aadaamal Aadugiren"	Vaali	P. Susheela	3:54
2.	"Adho Andha Paravai Pola"	Kannadasan	T. M. Soundararajan	5:03
3.	"Naanamo Innum Naanamo"	Kannadasan	T. M. Soundararajan, P. Susheela	4:45
4.	"Odum Maegangalae"	Kannadasan	T. M. Soundararajan	4:31
5.	"Paruvam Enathu Paadal"	Vaali	P. Susheela	4:26
6.	"Unnai Naan Santhithaen"	Vaali	P. Susheela	3:27
7.	"Yaen Endra Kaelvi"	Vaali	T. M. Soundararajan	3:46
Total length:				29:52

== Release ==
Aayirathil Oruvan was released on 9 July 1965. Though the film was released only in three theatres in Madras – Midlands, Mekala and Sri Krishna, it emerged a critical and commercial success, running for over 100 days in theatres. However, no event was held to celebrate the film's 100th day theatrical run, unlike other Tamil films of the period. On 16 October 1965, Padmini Pictures released a press statement saying this was a conscious decision due to "these days of national emergency".

== Critical reception ==
On 17 July 1965, The Indian Express criticised the story as formulaic and performances, but praised the action sequences, cinematography, and music. On 31 July, T. M. Ramachandran wrote for Sport and Pastime, "Although some of the scenes in the film have a familiar ring, the picture, on the whole, sustains the interest of the audience on account of some clever treatment by the director". On 1 August, Munusamy and Manikkam jointly reviewed the film for Ananda Vikatan. Munusamy liked the fact that there was no onscreen death; Manikkam concurred, saying that despite so many villains and fight scenes, there was not even a single death seen, and felt the title Aayirathil Oruvan rightly reflected Ramachandran's status as one good man in the midst of a thousand villains. Kalki appreciated the filmmakers for taking an old story and making it more vibrant.

== Legacy ==
A comparison between the original (above) and digitised versions.

Aayirathil Oruvan was a milestone for both Ramachandran and Jayalalithaa, who went on to co-star in more than 20 films; the latter considered the film "paved the way for [her] entry into politics". Historian G. Dhananjayan said it became a landmark in Tamil cinema for "its grand making and unique approach of even villains reforming". On Ramachandran's centenary in January 2017, Nivedita Mishra of Hindustan Times included his performance in Aayirathil Oruvan in her list compiling "some of his most memorable performances". The film was instrumental in cementing Ramachandran's image as a "do-gooder" among the general public.

== Re-release ==
Forty-nine years after the original theatrical release, the film was digitally enhanced for a planned re-release in January 2014. Apart from scope conversion from 35 mm to digital scope, the film also had a completely re-recorded background music played out by an assistant of M. S. Viswananthan. The digital conversion was done by Prasad EFX, Chennai, who had previously restored Karnan and Pasamalar (1961). Since the negatives were entirely damaged, the entire running length was converted. The film was distributed by Divya Films which had earlier released Karnan in digital format. The digitised version of Aayirathil Oruvan was released on 14 March 2014, and had a theatrical run of 175 days, becoming a silver jubilee hit.

== Bibliography ==
- Dhananjayan, G. (2011). The Best of Tamil Cinema, 1931 to 2010: 1931–1976. Galatta Media. OCLC 733724281.
- Kannan, R. (2017). MGR: A Life. India: Penguin Random House. ISBN 978-0-14-342934-0.
- Rajadhyaksha, Ashish; Willemen, Paul (1998) [1994]. Encyclopaedia of Indian Cinema. British Film Institute and Oxford University Press. ISBN 0-19-563579-5.
