= Engirundho Vandhan =

1995 film by Santhana Bharathi

- Poster
- Directed by: Santhana Bharathi
- Written by: Crazy Mohan (dialogue)
- Screenplay by: Santhana Bharathi
- Story by: Priyadarshan
- Produced by: V. Sundaran
- Starring: Sathyaraj; Roja; Aamani
- Cinematography: M. S. Prabhu
- Edited by: N. P. Sathish
- Music by: Viswanathan–Ramamoorthy
- Production company: VSR Pictures
- Release date: 15 January 1995
- Running time: 130 minutes
- Country: India
- Language: Tamil

Engirundho Vandhan (transl. He came from nowhere) is a 1995 Indian Tamil-language comedy film directed by Santhana Bharathi. The film stars Sathyaraj, Roja and Aamani, with Vijayakumar, Janagaraj, Kalyan Kumar, Vinu Chakravarthy, R. Sundarrajan, Bhanu Chander and Thyagu playing supporting roles. It was released on 15 January 1995. The composer duo Viswanathan–Ramamoorthy collaborated after a 30-year hiatus and it eventually became their last collaboration. The film was a remake of the Malayalam film Chithram (1988).

== Plot ==
Radha (Roja) is the daughter of the wealthy NRI Viswanathan (Kalyan Kumar) who resides in the United States. Radha is brought up in Chennai by her father's friend Manikandan (Janagaraj) and is in love with a man named Gautham (Bhanu Chander). Her father finds a groom in the US for her and wants his daughter to marry him, but Radha decides to marry Gautham against the wishes of her father. Manikandan supports her will and helps them get married. When her boyfriend finds out that she will be disinherited for marrying without her father's consent, he ditches her at the marriage registrar office.

Shortly after her father decides to retract his disapproval and to spend a fortnight's vacation with his daughter and his new son-in-law in his estate near a tribal community where Sundaram (R. Sundarrajan) is the chief. Because her father is already ill and because this may be his last vacation, Radha and Manikandan want to make it as happy for him as possible. They decide to conceal the fact that her boyfriend dumped her.

Manikandan hires the small-time crook Kannan (Sathyaraj) to play the part of the husband for a fortnight. What transpires next forms the rest of the story.

== Cast ==
- Sathyaraj as Kannan
- Roja as Radha
- Aamani as Janaki
- Vijayakumar as Police Commissioner
- Janagaraj as Manikandan
- Kalyan Kumar as Viswanathan
- Vinu Chakravarthy as Tribal Chief
- R. Sundarrajan as Sundaram
- Bhanu Chander as Gautham
- Thyagu as Sundaram's son
- R. S. Shivaji
- Kambar Jayaraman as Pandian, Janaki's father
- Kavithalaya Krishnan as Shiva
- S. V. Shanmugam
- Mohan Raman
- Bharani as Sundaram's daughter
- C. R. Saraswathi as Meenakshi, Sundaram's wife
- Ponvannan in a guest appearance

== Production ==
Dwarakish, who had the Tamil remake rights of Chithram, exchanged it in lieu of Kannada rights of Mr. India after K. Balaji expressed interest in making the film in Tamil. This was the debut production of V. R. Pictures who previously worked as distributors.

== Soundtrack ==
The soundtrack was composed by the duo Viswanathan–Ramamoorthy. They collaborated after 30 years (last being Aayirathil Oruvan in 1965) and it eventually became their last collaboration. The lyrics were written by Vaali.

Song	Singer(s)	Duration
"Nilave Vaa"	S. P. Balasubrahmanyam, K. S. Chithra	4:46
"Nandhavana"	S. P. Balasubrahmanyam, K. S. Chithra	5:25
"Oru Kootil"	S. P. Balasubrahmanyam, K. S. Chithra	5:28
"Andha Sriraman"	Mano, Swarnalatha	5:09
"Engirundho Vandhan"	S. P. Balasubrahmanyam	8:21
"Mounam Enbadhu"	S. P. Balasubrahmanyam, S. Janaki	4:56

== Reception ==
Thulasi of Kalki praised the film for having a natural, poignant ending and also noted the elegance with which the foundation was built from the beginning to the last-minute tragedy was awe-inspiring but felt there should have been more depth with the way flashback was set up and called few songs as speed breakers. She however concluded that director Santhana Bharathi has broken the argument of succeeding only with Kamal Haasan and called it a complete film. The film failed at the box office.
