= Vijaya Gauri =

- Theatrical release poster
- Directed by: D. Yoganand
- Written by: Samudrala Jr (dialogues)
- Story by: A. S. A. Swamy
- Starring: N. T. Rama Rao; Padmini
- Cinematography: M. A. Rehman; P. Rama Swamy
- Edited by: U. B. Natarajan
- Music by: G. Ramanathan; Viswanathan–Ramamoorthy
- Production company: Krishna Pictures
- Release date: 30 June 1955
- Country: India
- Language: Telugu

Vijaya Gauri is a 1955 Indian Telugu-language swashbuckler film, produced by Krishna Pictures banner and directed by D. Yoganand. It stars N. T. Rama Rao and Padmini, with music composed by G. Ramanathan and Viswanathan–Ramamoorthy. This film was shot simultaneously in Tamil as Kaveri with slightly different cast.

== Cast ==
- N. T. Rama Rao
- Padmini
- Relangi
- Gummadi
- M. N. Nambiar
- Mahankali Venkaiah
- A V Subbarao
- Rushyendramani
- Surabhi Kamalabai
- Surabhi Balasaraswathi
- Lalitha
- Ragini

== Soundtrack ==
Music composed by G. Ramanathan & Viswanathan–Ramamoorthy. Lyrics were written by Samudrala Jr.

Song title	Singers
"Andala Sandadilo"	
"Udataniki Illuleka"	
"Soodi"	
"Kosaruchu Naalona"	
"Sivanama Ranjani"	
"Raagala Vella"	
"Illuvakili Naadi"	
"Yenneno Rojuluga"	
"Premante Pramadama"	
