= Kathiruntha Kangal =

1962 film by T. Prakash Rao

- Theatrical release poster
- Directed by: T. Prakash Rao
- Screenplay by: M. S. Solamalai; Maa. Raa. (dialogues)
- Story by: Malabika Roy
- Produced by: T. K. Ramasamy
- Starring: Savitri Ganesan; Gemini Ganesan
- Cinematography: Kamal Ghosh
- Edited by: N. M. Shankar
- Music by: Viswanathan–Ramamoorthy
- Production company: Vasumathi Pictures
- Distributed by: Vijayasri Pictures
- Release date: 25 August 1962
- Running time: 148 minutes
- Country: India
- Language: Tamil

Kathiruntha Kangal (pronounced [kaːtiɾun̪ða kanɡaɭ] transl. The Eyes that Waited) is a 1962 Indian Tamil-language film directed by T. Prakash Rao. The film stars Savitri and Gemini Ganesan, the former in dual roles. It is a remake of the 1960 Bengali film Smrithi Tukku Thak, which itself was adapted from the Bengali play of the same name by Malabika Roy. The film revolves around twin sisters who get separated at birth due to circumstances, and cross paths as adults. It was released on 25 August 1962, and emerged a commercial success.

== Plot ==
Twin sisters Shenbagam and Lalitha get separated at birth due to poverty. Lalitha is adopted and brought up by a rich person, Panchanatha Mudaliar. The other twin, Shenbagam is raised by their mother Kamakshi. Krishna, a doctor, comes to treat the ailing Kamakshi, and unbeknown to Shenbagam falls in love with him. On her deathbed, Kamakshi reveals to Shenbagam about her twin sister's existence. Shenbagam goes in search of Lalitha and eventually both end up travelling on the same train. An accident occurs, causing Lalitha to lose her memory and she is presumed dead. Things further escalate when Krishnan marries Shenbagam, under the assumption that she is Lalitha. Their child is born, and the real Lalitha shows up. What transpires later forms the crux of the story.

== Cast ==
- Savitri Ganesan as Shenbagam and Lalitha
- Gemini Ganesan as Krishnan
- M. R. Radha as Thanikachalam
- S. V. Ranga Rao as Panchanatha Mudaliar
- Pandari Bai as Balaji's sister
- Sandhya as Thilagam
- S. N. Lakshmi as Kamakshi
- Raghavan as Dr. Nair
- P. D. Sambandam
- Karikol Raju as Ulaganathan
- Balaji as Doctor
- Gopalakrishnan as Sundaram

== Production ==
Kathiruntha Kangal is a remake of the 1960 Bengali film Smrithi Tukku Thak, which itself was adapted from the Bengali play of the same name by Malabika Roy. The film was directed by T. Prakash Rao, produced by T. K. Ramasamy under the banner Vasumathi Pictures, and its dialogues were written by M. S. Solamalai and Maa. Raa. Cinematography was handled by Kamal Ghosh, and editing by N. M. Shankar. Shooting took place at Vijaya-Vauhini Studios in Madras, Tamil Nadu.

== Soundtrack ==
The soundtrack was composed by the duo Viswanathan–Ramamoorthy, with lyrics by Kannadasan.

Track listing
No.	Title	Singer(s)	Length
1.	"Kaatru Vandhal"	P. B. Sreenivas, P. Susheela
2.	"Kanpadume"	P. B. Sreenivas
3.	"Odam Nathiyinile"	Sirkazhi Govindarajan
4.	"Thulli Thirintha"	P. B. Sreenivas
5.	"Vaa Endrathu"	P. Susheela
6.	"Valarntha Kalai"	P. B. Sreenivas, P. Susheela

== Release and reception ==
Kathiruntha Kangal was released on 25 August 1962 by Vijayasri Pictures, and emerged a commercial success. Kanthan of Kalki positively reviewed the film, calling Savitri's dual role performance its high point.
