= Pathini Deivam =

- Film poster
- Directed by: Ch. Narayanamurthi
- Screenplay by: K. M. Govindarajan
- Produced by: W. S. V. Naidu
- Starring: Gemini Ganesan; Savithri
- Music by: Viswanathan–Ramamoorthy
- Production company: VRV Productions
- Release date: 1957
- Country: India
- Language: Tamil

Pathini Deivam is a 1957 Indian Tamil-language film directed by Ch. Narayanamurthi. The film stars Gemini Ganesan and Savithri.

== Plot ==
Kulasekaran, King of Kurinjinadu, visits his friend Mahendran who is the King of Marudanadu. Mahendran, his wife Sivagami and son Manisekaran welcome Kulasekaran and ask him to stay with them for a while. Sivagami treats Kulasekaran like her brother and treats him well. But Mahendran suspects that there is a secret relationship between Kulasekaran and Sivagami. Mahendran calls his minister Madhiyugi and orders him to kill Sivagami. However, Madhiyugi tells the truth to Kulasekaran and takes him back to his Kurinjinadu. Again Mahendran suspects that Sivagami has helped Kulasekaran to escape to his country. Though she is pregnant, Mahendran sends Sivagami to prison. He orders that she should remain there till the child's birth and then be decapitated. Sivagami gives birth to a female child. As per the king's order, the soldiers take Sivagami and child to the jungle to kill them. But instead of killing, they place the child in a box with some ornaments and set sail the box in a river. They leave Sivagami in the jungle and return to the kingdom. A hunter finds Sivagami and takes her to his hut. The hunter's wife Singi suspects her husband and complains to the tribe's chief. The chief orders that Sivagami be taken to a hill top and thrown over. Meanwhile, Mahendran's son Manisekaran dies, unable to bear the loss of his mother. Mahendran realises his folly. He orders that statues of him and his wife be placed in several places and issues an order that people should beat his statue and worship his wife's statue. The child that was floating on the river was found by a person who named her as Ponni and brings her up as a young woman. Kulasekaran's son Rajendran happens to meet Ponni and falls in love with her. In the meantime, Marthandan, the son of Mahendran's minister tries to capture the kingdom and engages himself in various plots. Whether he succeeds, what was the fate of Sivagami, whether the lovers got married, forms the rest of the story.

== Cast ==
The following list was compiled from the film's song book.

- Gemini Ganesan
- M. N. Nambiar
- S. V. Ranga Rao
- P. S. Veerappa
- V. M. Ezhumalai
- J. P. Chandrababu
- Kaka Radhakrishnan
- Kittan
- Kannapiran
- Thiruvengadam
- Savithri
- G. Varalakshmi
- Rajasulochana
- M. Saroja
- Jayalakshmi
- Angamuthu

== Soundtrack ==
Music was composed by the duo Viswanathan–Ramamoorthy, while the lyrics were penned by Thanjai N. Ramaiah Dass.

Song	Singer/s	Length
"Chittupol Parakkum Kudhirai"	Udutha Sarojini	02:57
"Gnaanakkanna Ezhundhiru"	T. M. Soundararajan & P. Leela	06:24
"Vaaraai Indre Mohana"	P. Leela	03:18
"Chinna Chinna Vayasile"	P. Leela + Group	03:35
"Singara Chellakutti...Thanni Kudam Kakkathile"	T. M. Soundararajan + Group	03:14
"Kasakkuma Illai Rusikkuma"	T. M. Soundararajan & P. Susheela	03:21
"Mohana Punnagai Eno"	T. M. Soundararajan & P. Susheela	03:29
"Aathukku Paalam Avasiyam"	T. M. Soundararajan & J. P. Chandrababu	03:41
"Vedhaantham Pesuvaanga"	P. Susheela	03:22
"Naayagaa Naayagaa"	V. M. Ezhumalai & chorus	
"Ungal Manasu"	P. Leela	

== Reception ==
Jambavan of Kalki wrote.
