= Kudumba Gouravam =

- Directed by: B. S. Ranga
- Screenplay by: Udhayakumar
- Produced by: B. S. Ranga
- Starring: Gemini Ganesan; Savithri; K. Sarangapani; P. Kannamba
- Cinematography: B. N. Haridas
- Edited by: P. G. Mohan
- Music by: Viswanathan–Ramamoorthy
- Production company: Vikram Productions
- Release date: 28 February 1958
- Running time: 195 minutes
- Country: India
- Language: Tamil

Kudumba Gouravam (transl. Family Prestige) is a 1958 Indian Tamil-language drama film directed by B. S. Ranga. The film stars Gemini Ganesan and Savithri. It is a remake of 1957 the Telugu film of same name also directed by Ranga. The film was released on 28 February 1958.

== Plot ==
Kanagarathinam is the owner of Umaiyalpuram Farm. He has the son Gopal from his first marriage. Kannamma is his second wife and she has a son and a daughter. Sarala is Gopal's wife. The smooth-running family is disturbed by the arrival of Sankaralingam, a distant relative who claims that he is Kannamma's elder brother. He is an ace fraud and he swindles money from the farm. Gopal and Sarala are chased out of the farm house. Gopal vows to restore order and unity in the family. How he does that forms the rest of the story.

== Cast ==
List compiled from the database of Film News Anandan and from the film's song book.

Male cast

- Gemini Ganesan as Gopal
- K. Sarangapani as Kanagarathnam
- Sayeeram
- V. R. Rajagopal
- C. P. Kittan

Female cast

- Savithri as Sathya
- P. Kannamba as Kannamma
- E. V. Saroja as Sarala
- Baby Uma
- Prabhavathi

Supporting cast

- Duraisamy
- Thodi Kannan
- Rajan
- Kanniah
- Balakrishnan

== Production ==
The film was produced and directed by B. S. Ranga. Screenplay was written by Udhayakumar. Cinematography was handled by B. N. Haridas while the editing was done by P. G. Mohan. Chopra, P. S. Gopalakrishnan and Ganesh Pillai were in charge of choreography. The film was shot and processed at Vikram Studios, Chennai.

== Soundtrack ==
Music was composed by the duo Viswanathan–Ramamoorthy. The song "Thennavan Thaai Nattu" is a ragamalika with ragas Reethigowlai, Khamas and Hamsavinodini combined.

Song	Singer/s	Lyricist
"Kala Kalavendre Vaaru Salangai"	T. M. Soundararajan	A. Maruthakasi
"Kaalai Malarndhathadi Kanne"	P. Leela	A. Maruthakasi
"Engengu Ponaalum"	P. Leela	A. Maruthakasi
"Soda, Beedi, Beedaa"	A. L. Raghavan	A. Maruthakasi
"Kalyaanam Agaatha Kanni"	S. Janaki	A. Maruthakasi
"Singaaraa Oyyaaraa"	S. Janaki	A. Maruthakasi
"Saerum Kaalam Vandhaachu"	P. B. Srinivas, K. Jamuna Rani & L. R. Eswari	A. Maruthakasi
"Paa...Paa...Paaddil Pottaal"	P. Nageswara Rao	A. Maruthakasi
"Aavaaram Kaattukkulle"	A. L. Raghavan & K. Jamuna Rani	A. Maruthakasi
"Naan Porandha Seemaiyile"	Sirkazhi Govindarajan & group	A. Maruthakasi
"Verum Vesham Nee Nambaadhe"	A. P. Komala & A. G. Rathnamala	A. Maruthakasi
"Thennavan Thaai Naattu Singaarame"	P. Susheela	Kannadasan
