= Kalai Kovil =

1964 film directed by C. V. Sridhar

- Theatrical release poster
- Directed by: C. V. Sridhar
- Written by: C. V. Sridhar
- Produced by: Visu; Ganga
- Starring: S. V. Subbaiah; Chandrakantha; R. Muthuraman; Rajasree
- Cinematography: Balu
- Edited by: N. M. Shankar
- Music by: Viswanathan–Ramamoorthy
- Production company: Bhagyalakshmi Productions
- Release date: 25 September 1964
- Running time: 133 minutes
- Country: India
- Language: Tamil

Kalai Kovil (transl. Temple of art) is a 1964 Indian Tamil-language musical film written and directed by C. V. Sridhar. The film stars S. V. Subbaiah, R. Muthuraman, Chandrakantha and Rajasree, with Nagesh, V. Gopalakrishnan, V. S. Raghavan, Jayanthi and S. N. Lakshmi in supporting roles. It focuses on the rags to riches story of a veena vidwan, whose success is almost derailed when he takes to liquor abuse.

Kalai Kovil was produced under the banner Bhagyalakshmi Productions by M. S. Viswanathan (using the name Visu) and Ganga. Viswanathan also composed the film's soundtrack with T. K. Ramamoorthy under the name Viswanathan–Ramamoorthy, and Ganga also served as the art director. Sridhar's frequent collaborator Chithralaya Gopu served as the film's assistant dialogue writer.

Kalai Kovil was released on 25 September 1964 and received positive reviews from critics for its music, cast performances, writing and direction by Sridhar. It was not commercially successful, but the song "Thangaratham Vanthathu", performed by P. Susheela and M. Balamuralikrishna, attained popularity.

== Plot ==
An impoverished man rises from rags to riches by becoming a veena player, but his success is nearly destroyed by alcoholism and an affair with a dancer."

== Cast ==
Male cast

- S. V. Subbaiah
- R. Muthuraman
- Nagesh
- V. Gopalakrishnan
- V. S. Raghavan

Female cast

- Chandrakantha
- Rajasree
- Jayanthi
- S. N. Lakshmi

== Production ==
After the success of Kadhalikka Neramillai (1964), its producer and director C. V. Sridhar decided to make his next directorial venture based on the life of a musician. His frequent collaborator, writer Chithralaya Gopu met up with him at Marina Beach to discuss their next project which he wanted to be a comedy, but Sridhar told him to listen to the story he already finished writing, the story that became the film Kalai Kovil. Gopu was assigned as the film's assistant dialogue writer. After listening to the story, composer M. S. Viswanathan decided to produce the film along with Ganga under the banner Bhagyalakshmi Productions. Ganga also worked as the art director, while Viswanathan was credited as "Visu" for his role as producer in the posters and opening credits. Cinematography was handled by Balu, and editing by N. M. Shankar. Chitti Babu played the veena offscreen for Muthuraman. S. V. Ranga Rao was Sridhar's initial choice for the lead role; since he did not turn up on the sets on the first day of the shoot, he was replaced with S. V. Subbaiah who initially refused to play the role as he was asked to sport a fake beard which he was not comfortable with but later relented.

== Soundtrack ==
The soundtrack was composed by Viswanathan–Ramamoorthy (a duo consisting of M. S. Viswanathan and T. K. Ramamoorthy) and the lyrics were penned by Kannadasan. The song "Deviyar Iruvar" is set in the Carnatic raga known as Shree, while "Thangaratham Vanthathu" is set in Abhogi. Shyam was the violinist of the latter song, which attained popularity. He felt diffident in playing the classical-themed song as he was then more comfortable with westernised songs.

Track listing
No.	Title	Singer(s)	Length
1.	"Naan Unnai Serndha"	P. Susheela, P. B. Sreenivas	3:41
2.	"Thangaratham Vanthathu"	P. Susheela, M. Balamuralikrishna	3:31
3.	"Mullil Roja"	L. R. Eswari, P. B. Sreenivas	5:47
4.	"Varavendum"	L. R. Eswari	3:45
5.	"Deviyar Iruvar"	P. Susheela	3:47
6.	"Arivennum Kalvi Neeye"	Sirkazhi Govindarajan	2:00
Total length:			22:31

== Release and reception ==
Kalai Kovil was released on 25 September 1964. The film received positive reviews from critics who praised the music, performances of the cast, the screenplay, dialogues and direction by Sridhar. On 2 October 1964, The Indian Express praised the first half, but criticised the second half, saying the film maintained a "richly musical and at times absorbing" tone till the second half, when "scripter-director Sridhar's hands, like that of the hero in the movie, begin to slip". The reviewer called the songs composed by Viswanathan–Ramamoorthy "a delight to the ears", but felt they did not exploit the veena, "the very soul of the film", fully. They also lauded Balu's cinematography, Ganga's art direction and the performances of Subbaiah and Nagesh, saying they "try to salvage the film, but in vain". The film was commercially unsuccessful. The film had a re-release in 1977. Free India wrote a review during its re-release praised the acting and music.

== Bibliography ==
- Sundararaman (2007) [2005]. Raga Chintamani: A Guide to Carnatic Ragas Through Tamil Film Music (2nd ed.). Pichhamal Chintamani. OCLC 295034757.
