= Raja Malaya Simha =

Raja Malaya Simhan
- Poster
- Directed by: B. S. Ranga
- Story by: Anishtti
- Produced by: B. S. Ranga
- Starring: Ranjan; Sowkar Janaki; Rajasulochana; Rajanala Kaleswara Rao
- Cinematography: B. N. Haridas
- Edited by: P. G. Mohan
- Music by: Viswanathan–Ramamoorthy
- Release dates: 27 February 1959 (Telugu); 6 March 1959 (Tamil)
- Running time: 184 minutes
- Country: India
- Languages: Telugu; Tamil

Raja Malaya Simha (or Raja Malaya Simhan) is a 1959 Indian Telugu/Tamil-language film directed and produced by B. S. Ranga. This film is known to be the first Telugu film to contain sequences in Eastmancolor.

== Cast ==
Cast according to the opening credits of the film

Male cast

- Ranjan as Raja
- K. Sarangapani
- Rajanala
- Sayeeram as Bharavasingam
- Kulathu Mani as King
- Ganapathi Bhat as Malaya King
- Thodi Kannan as Dharmakirti
- Venkatesh as Raghupathi
- Krishnan
- G. K. Venkatesh

Female cast

- P. Rajasulochana as Chitralekha
- Sowcar Janaki as Malathi
- M. S. Draupadi as Manorama
- K. Suryakala as Sundari
- K. S. Angamuthu as Sugandhi

Ship Dance

- Miss Cuckoo (Bombay)

== Production ==
Raja Malaya Simha was simultaneously shot in Tamil as Raja Malaya Simhan. Udayakumar wrote the dialogues and A. Maruthakasi penned the lyrics. The costumes were designed by V. N. Murthi.

== Soundtrack ==
The soundtrack was composed by Viswanathan–Ramamoorthy. All the tunes for all the songs for both languages are the same.

=== Tamil Songs ===
All lyrics are by A. Maruthakasi.

Song	Singer/s	Duration (m:ss)
"Vaazhvadhu Endrum Unmaiye"	Seerkazhi Govindarajan & Salem Seenivasan	03:36
"Ullaasamaagave"	K. Jamuna Rani	04:43
"Kannaal Kaanbaadhum Poyye"	A. P. Komala	02:08
"Kannukku Kannaana Kaatchi"	P. Susheela	03:07
"Vennilave Nillu"	P. Susheela	02:49
"Aasai Maamaa"	S. C. Krishnan & L. R. Eswari	02:36
"Edhanaale Edhanaale"	S. C. Krishnan & S. Janaki	02:41
"Gundoosikkanngal"	P. Susheela	
"Maaligaiyilae Vasikkum"	P. B. Sreenivas, Seerkazhi Govindarajan & G. K. Venkatesh	03:37
"Jigijigichchaang Kuruvi"	Seerkazhi Govindarajan & K. Jamuna Rani	02:39
"Aattam Aadumbodhu Nottam Paarkkadhe"	M. S. Viswanathan & S. Janaki	02:21
"Azhagae Amudhae"	P. B. Sreenivas & P. Susheela	03:16

=== Telugu Songs ===
All lyrics are by Anisetti.

Song	Singer/s	Duration (m:ss)
"Jaya Jaya Bhaaratha Veerudaa"	Pithapuram Nageswara Rao	03:36
"Aanandha Seemalo"	K. Jamuna Rani	04:43
"Magamu Choosi"	Madhavapeddi Satyam & Pithapuram Nageswara Rao	02:08
"Sangeetha Saahithya Leelaa"	P. Susheela	03:07
"Vennelane Haayi Valapinche"	L. R. Eswari	02:49
"Chinnavaadaa O Vannetaadaa"	Madhavapeddi Satyam & Swarnalatha	02:36
"Katthi Kannaa"	Pithapuram Nageswara Rao & S. Janaki	02:41
"Andhamulanni Neeke"	P. Susheela	
"Oranna Mosappukaalam"	P. B. Sreenivas, Pithapuram Nageswara Rao & G. K. Venkatesh	03:37
"Jingilijikki Jingilijikki"	Madhavapeddi Satyam & K. Jamuna Rani	02:39
"Yemanandhu Gopalaluni Leela"	L. R. Eswari	02:08
"Aase Virise"	P. B. Sreenivas & P. Susheela	03:16
