= Pathi Bakthi =

- Theatrical release poster
- Directed by: A. Bhimsingh
- Screenplay by: A. Bhimsingh
- Story by: M. S. Solaimalai
- Produced by: A. Bhimsingh
- Starring: Sivaji Ganesan; Savitri
- Cinematography: G. Vittal Rao
- Edited by: A. Bhimsingh
- Music by: Viswanathan–Ramamoorthy
- Production company: Buddha Pictures
- Release date: 14 March 1958
- Running time: 181 minutes
- Country: India
- Language: Tamil

Pathi Bakthi (transl. Devotion to Husband) is a 1958 Indian Tamil-language drama film directed by A. Bhimsingh, starring Sivaji Ganesan, Gemini Ganesan, Savitri and M. N. Rajam. It was released on 14 March 1958.

== Plot ==
The narrative follows a woman's unwavering devotion and loyalty to her husband while navigating marital struggles and financial hardships brought on by her husband's alcoholism.

== Cast ==
Cast adapted from the film's song book and the opening credits:

Male cast

- Sivaji Ganesan as Pandiyan
- Gemini Ganesan as Moorthy
- V. Nagayya (guest) as Butha Bhikshu
- T. S. Balaiah (guest) as Sanyasi
- K. A. Thangavelu as Parameswaran Pillai
- Chandrababu as Kalaipithan
- M. R. Santhanam as Nallasivam Pillai
- Krishnan as Thirupathy
- Rama Rao as Iyer
- Karikol Raju as Home Owner
- Balakrishnan

Female cast

- Savithri as Alli, Bhagyam
- M. N. Rajam as Marikozhunthu
- Vijayakumari as Nalini
- C. K. Saraswathi as Meenakshi
- M. S. Saroja as Mohana
- K. Malathi (guest) as Dancer
- Angamuthu, Uma, Patti
- Radhabhai

== Soundtrack ==
The music was composed by Viswanathan–Ramamoorthy, while the lyrics were penned by Pattukkottai Kalyanasundaram.

Song	Singers	Length
"Ambigaye Muthu Mariyamma"	T. M. Soundararajan & P. Susheela	03:26
"Veedu Nokki Odi Vandha"	T. M. Soundararajan	03:13
"Veedu Nokki Odi Vandha" (pathos)	T. M. Soundararajan	03:13
"Iraipodum Manidharukee"	P. Susheela	03:04
"Chinnachiru Kanmalar"	P. Susheela	03:28
"Dharmamembar...Indha Thinnai Pechu"	T. M. Soundararajan & J. P. Chandrababu	05:20
"Kokkara Kokkarako Sevale"	T. M. Soundararajan & Jikki	03:09
"Rock Rock Rock n Roll"	J. P. Chandrababu & V. N. Sundaram	04:47
"Kosari Kosari"	J. P. Chandrababu	02:29
"Paappaa Un Appaavai"	A. M. Rajah	01:08

Pathi Bakthi (Telugu) Songs

The music was composed by T. Chalapathi Rao. Lyrics were by Sri Sri.

Song	Singers	Length
"Ambikaye Talli Mariyamma"	Pithapuram Nageswara Rao & P. Susheela	03:26
"Veeduleni Guduleni Dasari"	Ghantasala	03:13
"Veeduleni Guduleni Chinnadi" (pathos)	Madhavapeddi Satyam	03:13
"Chedipovu Mnujulake"	P. Susheela	03:04
"Chini Chini Kannula"	P. Susheela	03:28
"Ee Neethulu Palike Peddalanu"	Ghantasala & K. Apppa Rao	05:20
"Tamasha Rock Rock"	Pithapuram Nageswara Rao & Jikki	03:09
"Rock Rock Rock n Roll"	J. P. Chandrababu & V. N. Sundaram	04:47
"Kosari Kosari"	J. P. Chandrababu	02:29
