= Porter Kandan =

- Theatrical release poster
- Directed by: K. Vembu
- Written by: Sandilyan; Ko. Tha. Shanmugasundaram; M. S. Kannan
- Story by: P. Chengaiah
- Produced by: V. L. Narasu
- Starring: M. K. Radha; G. Varalakshmi; S. V. Subbaiah
- Cinematography: M. Masthan
- Edited by: R. Rajagopal
- Music by: Viswanathan–Ramamoorthy
- Production company: Narasu Studios
- Release date: 14 April 1955
- Running time: 190 minutes
- Country: India
- Language: Tamil

Porter Kandan is a 1955 Indian Tamil-language film directed by K. Vembu. The film stars M. K. Radha and G. Varalakshmi. It was released on 14 April 1955.

== Cast ==
The list is adapted from the database of Film News Anandan.

- M. K. Radha
- G. Varalakshmi
- Valayapathy G. Muthukrishnan
- D. Balasubramaniam
- T. S. Durairaj
- T. P. Muthulakshmi
- M. N. Nambiar
- R. Lalitha
- S. V. Subbaiah
- Rajamani
- M. K. Mustafa
- K. Doraisami
- 'Master' Babuji
- 'Baby' Maheswari

== Production ==
The film was produced by V. L. Narasu under the banner Narasu Studios (a subsidiary of Narasu coffee company) and directed by K. Vembu. P. Chengaiah wrote the story while the dialogues were written by M. S. Kannan, novelist Sandilyan and K. T. Shanmugasundaram. Cinematography was by M. Masthan and editing by R. Rajagopal and Balaraman. A. K. Sekar was the art director and P. G. Chellappa the choreographer. Still photography was done by R. P. Sarathy.

== Soundtrack ==
Music was composed by the duo Viswanathan–Ramamoorthy.

Song	Singer/s	Lyricist
"Kondaatam Kondaatam"	Thiruchi Loganathan, S. C. Krishnan, Sellamuthu, Madhavan, K. Rani	A. Maruthakasi
"Ezhuthi Chellum Vidhiyin Kai...Varundhaathe Maname"	S. C. Krishnan	A. Maruthakasi
"Vinaiyaa, Vidhiyaa, Ulagin Sadhiyaa"	Ghantasala	A. Maruthakasi
"Aadhiyaai Ulagukellaam"	V. N. Sundaram	Ambikapathy
"Nalla Nalla Sevai, Naattuku Thevai"	Jikki & Chorus	Azha. Valliyappa
"Vidumurai, Vidumurai, Vidumurai"	Baby Rajakumari, Krishnaveni & Baby Jaya	K. T. Shanmugasundaram
