= List of Tamil films of 1960 =

Post-amendment to the Tamil Nadu Entertainments Tax Act 1939 on 1 April 1958, Gross jumped to 140 per cent of Nett Commercial Taxes Department disclosed ₹2.02 crore in entertainment tax revenue for the year.

The following is a list of films produced in the Tamil film industry in India in 1960, in alphabetical order.

== 1960 ==
Title	Director	Production	Music	Cast	Release date (D-M-Y)
Aada Vandha Deivam	P. Neelakantan	Majestic Studios	K. V. Mahadevan	T. R. Mahalingam, Anjali Devi, E. V. Saroja, M. R. Radha	01-04-1960
Aalukkoru Veedu	M. Krishnan	Subash Movies	Viswanathan–Ramamoorthy	Sathyan, L. Vijayalakshmi, T. R. Ramachandran	16-09-1960
Adutha Veettu Penn	Vedantam Raghavayya	Anjali Pictures	Adhi Narayana Rao	Anjali Devi, T. R. Ramachandran, K. A. Thangavelu	11-02-1960
Anbukkor Anni	T. R. Raghunath	Film Centre	A. M. Rajah	Prem Nazir, Mynavathi, Pandari Bai	05-02-1960
Baghdad Thirudan	T. P. Sundaram	Southern Movies	G. Govindarajulu Naidu	M. G. Ramachandran, Vyjayanthimala, M. N. Nambiar, M. N. Rajam	06-05-1960
Bala Nagamma; Dubbed from Telugu	Vedantam Raghavayya	Viswasanthi Pictures	Pamarthi	N. T. Rama Rao, S. V. Ranga Rao, Anjali Devi, Rajasulochana	
Bhaktha Sabari	Ch. Narayanamoorthi	Sugibava Productions	Pendyala	S. A. Asokan, Pandari Bai, Nagayya, L. Vijayalakshmi, Harinath, T. R. Saroja, Ramakrishna, Rajashree (Debut), Nagesh	28-10-1960
Chavukkadi Chandrakantha	A. L. Narayanan	Aruna Films	R. Govardhanam	T. S. Balaiah, T. K. Ramachandran, Jagadesan, Tambaram Lalitha, Sowcar Janaki	16-12-1960
Chinna Marumagal	P. V. Babu	Udaya Productions (K. Ramanathan)	L. Malleswara Rao	Sowkar Janaki, Udhayakumar, T. R. Narasimha Raju, Pandari Bai	
Deivapiravi	Krishnan–Panju	Kamaal Brothers	R. Sudarsanam	Sivaji Ganesan, Padmini, S. S. Rajendran, M. N. Rajam, Tambaram Lalitha	13-04-1960
Ellarum Innattu Mannar	T. Prakash Rao	Jupiter Pictures	T. G. Lingappa	Gemini Ganesan, B. Saroja Devi, M. N. Nambiar	01-07-1960
Engal Selvi	D. Yoganand	Associate Producers	K. V. Mahadevan	A. Nageswara Rao, Anjali Devi, T. S. Balaiah	08-07-1960
Irumanam Kalanthal Thirumanam	Jambanna; G. Viswanathan	V. S. P. Pictures	S. Dakshinamurthi	Prem Naseer, Ragini, M. N. Rajam	25-11-1960
Irumbu Thirai	S. S. Vasan	Gemini Studios	S. V. Venkatraman	Sivaji Ganesan, Vyjayanthimala, K. A. Thangavelu, B. Saroja Devi	14-01-1960
Ivan Avanethan	P. Sridhar	T. G. R. Pictures	M. Ranga Rao	Uthayakumar, Pandari Bai, S. V. Sahasranamam, Ambika, K. Sarangapani, Devika, A. K. Veerasamy, S. N. Lakshmi, Rajamani, Uma	25-03-1960
Kadavulin Kuzhandhai	Dada Mirasi	Vetrivel Films	G. Ramanathan	Kalyan Kumar, Jamuna, M. R. Radha	29-07-1960
Kaithi Kannayiram	A. S. A. Sami	Modern Theatres	K. V. Mahadevan	K. A. Thangavelu, R. S. Manohar, P. S. Veerappa	01-12-1960
Kairasi	K. Shankar	Vasu Films	R. Govardhanam	Gemini Ganesan, B. Saroja Devi, K. A. Thangavelu	19-10-1960
Kalathur Kannamma	A. Bhimsingh	AVM Productions	R. Sudarsanam	Gemini Ganesan, Savitri, Kamal Haasan	12-08-1960
Kavalai Illaadha Manithan	K. Shankar	Kannadasan Productions	Viswanathan–Ramamoorthy	J. P. Chandrababu, M. R. Radha, Rajasulochana, T. S. Balaiah, L. Vijayalakshmi	19-08-1960
Kuravanji	A. Kasilingam	Mekala Pictures	T. R. Pappa	Sivaji Ganesan, Savitri, Mynavathi, Pandari Bai	04-03-1960
Kuzhandhaigal Kanda Kudiyarasu	B. R. Panthulu	Padmini Pictures	T. G. Lingappa	B. R. Panthulu, M. V. Rajamma	29-05-1960
Mahalakshmi	A. L. Narayanan	Sri Panduranga Productions	K. V. Mahadevan	S. V. Sahasranamam, Pandaribai, K. Balaji, Mynavathi, R. Muthuraman	22-04-1960
Mangaikku Maangalyame Pradhaanam; Dubbed from Kannada	H. L. N. Simha	Sri Jamuna Productions	Jeevan	Rajkumar, Pandari Bai, M. V. Rajamma, Narasimharaju, B. R. Panthulu, Dikki Madhava Rao, H. L. N. Simha, Mynavathi and Advani Lakshmi Devi	
Mannathi Mannan	M. Natesan	Natesh Arts Films	Viswanathan–Ramamoorthy	M. G. Ramachandran, Anjali Devi, Padmini, P. S. Veerappa	19-10-1960
Meenda Sorgam	C. V. Sridhar	Mathuram Pictures	T. Chalapathi Rao	Gemini Ganesan, Padmini, K.A. Thangavelu	29-07-1960
Naan Kanda Sorgam	C. Pullaiah	Bhargavi Films	G. Aswathamma	K. A. Thangavelu, Sowcar Janaki, M. S. Sundari Bai, S. V. Ranga Rao, P. V. Narasimha Bharathi, P. D. Sambandam	12-08-1960
Ondrupattal Undu Vazhvu	T. R. Ramanna	Ranga Films	MSV-TKR	Prem Nazir, E. V. Saroja, M. R. Radha	15-07-1960
Paadhai Theriyudhu Paar	Nemai Ghosh	Kumari Films	M. B. Sreenivasan	Vijayan, L. Vijayalakshmi, S. V. Sahasranamam	18-11-1960
Pattaliyin Vetri	A. Subba Rao	Sambu Films	S. Rajeswara Rao	A. Nageswara Rao, Savithri, S. V. Ranga Rao, Girija, T. S. Balaiah, Sukumari, K. A. Thangavelu, E. V. Saroja, K. Sarangapani and K. R. Sellam	19-02-1960
Padikkadha Medhai	A. Bhimsingh	Bala Movies	K. V. Mahadevan	Sivaji Ganesan, Sowcar Janaki, P. Kannamba	25-06-1960
Parthiban Kanavu	D. Yoganand	Jublee Films	Vedha	Gemini Ganesan, Vyjayanthimala, S. V. Ranga Rao, P. S. Veerappa	03-06-1960
Paavai Vilakku	K. Somu	Sri Vijayagopal Pictures	K. V. Mahadevan	Sivaji Ganesan, Sowcar Janaki, M. N. Rajam, Pandari Bai	19-10-1960
Petra Manam	A. Bhimsingh	National Pictures	S.Rajeswara Rao	Sivaji Ganesan, Padmini, S. S. Rajendran, M. N. Rajam, J. P. Chandrababu, Padmini Priyadarshini	19-10-1960
Petraval Kanda Peruvazhvu	P. Subramaniam	Neela Productions	R. Devarajan	Prem Nazir, Miss Kumari, Rajasree	
Ponnaana Kudumbam; Dubbed from Telugu te:కూతురు కాపురం	Shoban Rao	Swarnambika Pictures	M. B. Srinivasan	Jaggayya, Jamuna, Ramana Reddy, Rajasulochana	12-09-1960
Ponni Thirunaal	A. K. Velan	Arunachala Pictures	K. V. Mahadevan	Muthukrishna, Rajasulochana, L. Vijayalakshmi	09-09-1960
Pudhiya Pathai	Tapi Chanakya	Sri Saradha Pictures	K. V. Mahadevan	Gemini Ganesan, Savitri, K. A. Thangavelu	17-11-1960
Raja Bakthi	K. Vembu	Nandhi Pictures	G. Govindarajulu Naidu	Sivaji Ganesan, Vyjayanthimala, Bhanumathi, Padmini	27-05-1960
Raja Desingu	T. R. Raghunath	Krishna Pictures	G. Ramanathan	M. G. Ramachandran, S. S. Rajendran, P. Bhanumathi, Padmini	02-09-1960
Raja Magudam	B. N. Reddy	Vauhini Productions	Master Venu	N. T. Rama Rao, Rajasulochana, Gummadi, P. Kannamba	25-02-1960
Rathinapuri Ilavarasi	T. R. Ramanna	Sri Vinayaga Pictures	Viswanathan–Ramamoorthy	T. R. Mahalingam, E. V. Saroja, M. R. Radha, Padmini Priyadarshini	13-04-1960
Revathi	M. Krishnan	Diamond Films	K. V. Mahadevan	K. Balaji, Sowcar Janaki, T. S. Balaiah	
Sangilithevan	B. R. Panthulu	Padmini Pictures	T. G. Lingappa	S. S. Rajendran, Rajasulochana	27-05-1960
Sivagami	A. Mitradas	Muthaiah Pictures	K. V. Mahadevan	M. K. Thyagaraja Bhagavathar, G. Varalakshmi, Jaggayya, S. D. Subbulakshmi, Natarajan, Jayashri	09-02-1960
Solaimalai Rani	A. Rajaram	Shivaji Pictures	C. N. Pandurangan	Prem Kumar, Vijayamala, Chandar Rao	19-10-1960
Thangarathinam	S. S. Rajendran	S. S. R. Pictures	K. V. Mahadevan	S. S. Rajendran, C. R. Vijayakumari	25-11-1960
Thangam Manasu Thangam	R. M. Krishnaswamy	Friends Pictures	K. V. Mahadevan	Prem Nazir, M. N. Rajam, K. A. Thangavelu	
Thanthaikku Pin Thamaiyan	G. R. Rao	Suryaa Films	K. V. Mahadevan	T. R. Mahalingam, Pandari Bai, T. K. Ramachandran, O. A. K. Thevar, Mynavathi, C. D. Vanaja|Vanaja, N. N. Kannappa, Manorama	14-01-1960
Thilakam	Krishnan–Panju	AVM Productions	R. Sudarsanam	Prem Nazir, M. N. Rajam, Sriranjani, Tambaram Lalitha, Kuladeivam Rajagopal,	10-11-1960
Thozhan	K. Vembu	A. T. M. Productions	G. Ramanathan	R. S. Manohar, P. V. Narasimha Bharathi, N. S. Krishnan, Anjali Devi, Madhuri Devi, T. A. Mathuram	25-11-1960
Uthami Petra Rathinam	M. A. Thirumugam	Devar Films	T. Chalapathi Rao	K. Balaji, Malini, T. K. Ramachandran, P. Kannamba, M. N. Rajam	
Veerakkanal	G. K. Ramu	P. S. V Pictures	K. V. Mahadevan	Gemini Ganesan, Anjali Devi, P. S. Veerappa	02-12-1960
Vidivelli	C. V. Sridhar	Praburam Pictures	A. M. Rajah	Sivaji Ganesan, B. Saroja Devi, S. V. Ranga Rao, K. Balaji, M. N. Rajam	31-12-1960
Vijayapuri Veeran	Joseph Thaliath Jr.	Citadel Film Corporation	T. R. Pappa	C. L. Anandan, S. A. Ashokan, Hemalatha	12-02-1960
Yanai Paagan	M. A. Thirumurugan	Devar Films	K. V. Mahadevan	Udaykumar, B. Saroja Devi, P. S. Veerappa, Daisy Irani	19-10-1960
