= A. L. Raghavan =

Indian singer (1933–2020)

Kalaimamani A. L. Raghavan
- Born: 1933; Ayyampettai, Tanjore District, Madras Presidency, British India (now in Thanjavur district, Tamil Nadu, India)
- Died: 19 June 2020 (aged 86–87) Chennai, Tamil Nadu, India
- Genres: Playback singing, Carnatic music, Hindustani music
- Occupation: Singer
- Instrument: Vocals
- Years active: 1947–2020
- Spouse: M. N. Rajam
- Award: Kalaimamani Award (1992)

A. L. Raghavan (1933 – 19 June 2020) was an Indian playback singer, who sang many songs in Tamil-language films.

== Biography ==
Raghavan was born to a Saurashtra family in Ayyampettai near Thanjavur to Lakshmana Bhagavathar, Raghavan entered the film world as a child artiste in the film Krishna Vijayam. He was married to the veteran actress M. N. Rajam.

== Death ==
He died on 19 June 2020 due to COVID-19.

== Career ==
A. L. Raghavan started his career in 1947 with 'Krishna Vijayam' (1950) and 'Sudarsanam' as Lord Krishna. He also acted in the TV series 'Aliaigal'. As a boy, he was introduced by Chidambaram Jayaraman and sang in a girl's voice for Kumari Kamala in the film Vijayakumari.

=== Music composers he sang for ===
Many music directors gave him memorable songs, including C. R. Subburaman, K. V. Mahadevan, Viswanathan–Ramamoorthy, S. M. Subbaiah Naidu, C. N. Pandurangan, S. V. Venkatraman, Ghantasala, H. R. Padmanabha Sastri, S. Dakshinamurthi, R. Sudarsanam, T. R. Pappa, Vedha, Master Venu, P. Adinarayana Rao, G. K. Venkatesh, V. Kumar, Rajan–Nagendra, Vijaya Bhaskar, G. Devarajan, M. S. Baburaj, Veenai S. Balachander, B. Gopalam, T. A. Kalyanam, K. G. Moorthy, S. P. Kodandapani, T. V. Raju and M. S. Viswanathan.

=== Playback singers he sang with ===
He had many solo songs but also sang with other singers. He sang immemorable duets mostly with K. Jamuna Rani and L. R. Eswari. Others are P. Susheela, Jikki, S. Janaki, M. S. Rajeswari, A. P. Komala, A. G. Rathnamala, Soolamangalam Rajalakshmi, P. Leela, K. Swarna, Kausalya, Renuka, Sarala, M. R. Vijaya, Manorama, L. R. Anjali and Swarnalatha.

He also sang duets with male singers, most notably with T. M. Soundararajan, S. C. Krishnan, S. V. Ponnusamy, P. B. Sreenivas, J. P. Chandrababu, Seerkazhi Govindarajan, Thiruchi Loganathan, T. A. Mothi, Sai Baba, Malaysia Vasudevan, M. S. Viswanathan, K. Veeramani, G. K. Venkatesh, Dharapuram Sundararajan, S. P. Balasubrahmanyam and Sean Roldan.

== Awards ==
- 1992: Received title of Kalaimamani Award by the Government of Tamil Nadu, which is the highest state honour in the field of Arts

== Television ==
- 2001–2003 Alaigal as Chandrasekhar (Sun TV)
- 2004–2006 Ahalya (Sun TV)

== Filmography ==
Year	Film	Language	Song	Music director	Co-singer
1950	Krishna Vijayam	Tamil	Eppadi Sakippadhu	C. S. Jayaraman & S. M. Subbaiah Naidu	Thiruchi Loganathan, S. S. Mani Bhagavathar, T. M. Soundararajan & K. S. Angamuthu
1950	Vijayakumari	Tamil	Kaatchi Yaavaiyum	C. R. Subburaman & C. S. Jayaraman	K. R. Ramasamy & T. R. Rajakumari
1952	Valaiyapathi	Tamil	Palli Koodam Bamm Bamm	S. Dakshinamurthi	
1954	Pona Machaan Thirumbi Vandhan	Tamil	Odam Polae Namathu	C. N. Pandurangan & M. S. Viswanathan	V. N. Sundaram, T. Sathyavathi & Subbulakshmi
1955	Chella Pillai	Tamil	Aararo Aararo.... Koil Kaalai Nee Paaapaa	R. Sudarsanam	T. M. Soundararajan & P. Susheela
1957	Ambikapathy	Tamil		G. Ramanathan	
1957	Pudhaiyal	Tamil	Hello My Dear Raami	Viswanathan–Ramamoorthy	J. P. Chandrababu
1958	Illarame Nallaram	Tamil	Jaani Nee Vaa Vaa	K. G. Moorthy	S. Janaki
1958	Kudumba Gouravam	Tamil	Aavarang Kaattukkulle	Viswanathan–Ramamoorthy	K. Jamuna Rani
1958	Kudumba Gouravam	Tamil	Sodaa Beedi Beedaa	Viswanathan–Ramamoorthy	
1958	Lilly	Malayalam	Elela Ezham Kadalinu	Viswanathan–Ramamoorthy	
1958	Lilly	Malayalam	Naale Ninte Kalyaanam	Viswanathan–Ramamoorthy	
1958	Maya Manithan	Tamil	Pokku Kaatti Poravale Ponnaammaa	G. Govindarajulu Naidu	A. G. Rathnamala
1958	Naan Valartha Thangai	Tamil	Indhiyaavin Raajathaani Dilli	Pendyala Nageswara Rao	Jikki
1958	Thirumanam	Tamil	Kazhani Engum Sadhiraadum	S. M. Subbaiah Naidu & T. G. Lingappa	Jikki
1959	Abalai Anjugam	Tamil	Adichadhu Paar Onnaam Nambar	K. V. Mahadevan	A. G. Rathnamala
1959	Abalai Anjugam	Tamil	Keezhe Bhoomi, Maele Vaanam	K. V. Mahadevan	S. C. Krishnan & P. Leela
1959	Azhagarmalai Kalvan	Tamil	Kannaale Pesum Mei Kaadhale	B. Gopalam	P. Susheela
1959	Bhaaga Pirivinai	Tamil	Aattatthile Palavagai Undu	Viswanathan–Ramamoorthy	K. Jamuna Rani
1959	Deivame Thunai	Tamil	O Raja Ennai Paaru	S. M. Subbaiah Naidu	S. Janaki
1959	Deiva Balam	Tamil	Adichchaa Adi Vayitthile Aditchchidanum	G. Aswathama	P. B. Sreenivas
1959	Jaya Veeran	Tamil	Thallaathe Bathil Sollaathe	K. V. Mahadevan	A. G. Rathnamala
1959	Naalu Veli Nilam	Tamil	Nambinaar Keduvadhillai Naanku Marai Theerpu	K. V. Mahadevan	Andal
1959	Naatukoru Nallaval	Tamil	Azhagamudhe Odi Vaa	Master Venu	K. Jamuna Rani
1959	Orey Vazhi	Tamil		R. Govardhanam	
1959	Panchaali	Tamil	Oru Murai Paartthaale Podhum	K. V. Mahadevan	
1959	Panchaali	Tamil	Azhagu Vilaiyaada Amaidhi Uravaada	K. V. Mahadevan	K. Jamuna Rani
1959	Pudhumai Penn	Tamil	Needhiyin Vetriyadaa Cheriyin Sakthi	T. G. Lingappa	T. M. Soundararajan
1959	Raja Sevai	Tamil	Konangi Kulla Potaa	T. V. Raju	A. P. Komala
1959	Raja Sevai	Tamil	Baleh Pervali Kannappaa	T. V. Raju	Thiruchi Loganathan
1959	Thalai Koduthaan Thambi	Tamil	Kadhai Kadhaiyaam Kaaranamaam	Viswanathan–Ramamoorthy	Jikki
1959	Thalai Koduthaan Thambi	Tamil	Vaada Vetthilai	Viswanathan–Ramamoorthy	K. Jamuna Rani
1959	Ulagam Sirikkirathu	Tamil	En Veettu Naai.... Tippu Kodutthu Tippu Kodutthu	S. Dakshinamurthi	S. C. Krishnan
1959	Uthami Petra Rathinam	Tamil	Lalla Lalla Lallalaa	T. Chalapathi Rao	S. V. Ponnusamy
1959	Uzhavukkum Thozhilukkum Vandhanai Seivom	Tamil	Kaai Kaai Avarai Kaai	K. V. Mahadevan	S. C. Krishnan
1959	Uzhavukkum Thozhilukkum Vandhanai Seivom	Tamil	I come from Paris	K. V. Mahadevan	P. Susheela
1960	Aadavantha Deivam	Tamil	Thimmikkida Thimikkida	K. V. Mahadevan	S. V. Ponnusamy
1960	Aalukkoru Veedu	Tamil	Pennille Nee Pennille	Viswanathan–Ramamoorthy	K. Rani
1960	Adutha Veettu Penn	Tamil	Katraar Niraindha Sangamidhu	P. Adinarayana Rao	
1960	Ellorum Innaattu Mannar	Tamil	Miruga Inam Thaan Sirandhadhu	T. G. Lingappa	Thiruchi Loganathan & P. Susheela
1960	Ellorum Innaattu Mannar	Tamil	Ellaarum Innaattu Mannaradaa	T. G. Lingappa	T. M. Soundararajan & L. R. Eswari
1960	Engal Selvi	Tamil	Ambuli Maamaa Varuvaaye	K. V. Mahadevan	M. S. Rajeswari
1960	Irumanam Kalanthal Thirumanam	Tamil	Idhu Niyaayama	K. V. Mahadevan	K. Jamuna Rani
1960	Irumanam Kalanthal Thirumanam	Tamil	Malarndhidum Inbam Ennum Vannam Pole	K. V. Mahadevan	K. Jamuna Rani
1960	Kuravanji	Tamil	Ennaalum Thanniyile	T. R. Pappa	Jikki
1960	Mahalakshmi	Tamil	Poiyum Purattum		K. V. Mahadevan
1960	Ondrupattal Undu Vazhvu	Tamil	Chaayaa Chaayaa Garam Chaayaa	Viswanathan–Ramamoorthy	
1960	Padikkadha Medhai	Tamil	Pakkatthile Kannippen Irukku	K. V. Mahadevan	K. Jamuna Rani
1960	Ponni Thirunaal	Tamil	Karumbu Villai Edutthu	K. V. Mahadevan	Seerkazhi Govindarajan, Thiruchi Loganathan, S. V. Ponnusamy & L. R. Eswari
1960	Raja Makudam	Tamil	Kelaayo Kadhaiyai Nee	Master Venu	
1960	Sivagami	Tamil		K. V. Mahadevan	
1960	Thangam Manasu Thangam	Tamil	Iruudhaa Amma	K. V. Mahadevan	Thiruchi Loganathan
1960	Thangam Manasu Thangam	Tamil	Aasai Mozhi Pesum	K. V. Mahadevan	
1960	Thanthaikku Pin Thamaiyan	Tamil	Malarum Manampol Iruppom	K. V. Mahadevan	Jikki
1960	Yanai Paagan	Tamil	Aambalaikku Pombalai Avasiyamthaan	K. V. Mahadevan	L. R. Eswari
1960	Yanai Paagan	Tamil	Pandhiyil Mattum Munne	K. V. Mahadevan	L. R. Eswari
1961	Bhagyalakshmi	Tamil	Singaara Cholaigal	Viswanathan–Ramamoorthy	K. Jamuna Rani
1961	Bhagyalakshmi	Tamil	Kaadhal Endraal Aanum Pennum	Viswanathan–Ramamoorthy	P. Susheela
1961	Ellam Unakkaga	Tamil	Naan Paartthaa Muraikkire	K. V. Mahadevan	L. R. Eswari
1961	Ennai Paar	Tamil	Paar Paar Ennai Paar	T. G. Lingappa	K. Jamuna Rani
1961	Kumudham	Tamil	Kaayame Idhu Poiyadaa	K. V. Mahadevan	T. M. Soundararajan
1961	Kongunattu Thangam	Tamil	Unna Nenachu Naan Irundhen	K. V. Mahadevan	L. R. Eswari
1961	Malliyam Mangalam	Tamil	Oyivam Sirikkuudhu	T. A. Kalyanam & M. K. Athmanathan	A. P. Komala
1961	Malliyam Mangalam	Tamil	Sundara Kannu	T. A. Kalyanam & M. K. Athmanathan	K. Jamuna Rani
1961	Marutha Nattu Veeran	Tamil	Seikathoru Santhegam Kelu Kanmani	S. V. Venkatraman	A. G. Rathnamala
1961	Nallavan Vazhvan	Tamil	Adichirukku Nallathoru Chansu	T. R. Pappa	S. Janaki
1961	Panithirai	Tamil	April Fool Endroru Jaadhi	K. V. Mahadevan	P. Susheela, L. R. Eswari & S. V. Ponnusamy
1961	Sabarimala Ayyappan	Malayalam	Ingottu Noku	S. M. Subbaiah Naidu	P. Leela
1961	Thayilla Pillai	Tamil	Kadavullum Nanum Oru Jaadhi	K. V. Mahadevan	
1961	Thayilla Pillai	Tamil	Kaalam Maarudhu Karutthu Maarudhu	K. V. Mahadevan	L. R. Eswari
1961	Thirudadhe	Tamil	Andhisaayum Neratthiley	S. M. Subbaiah Naidu	A. G. Rathnamala
1961	Veera Kumar	Tamil	Ponne Ponnendru	Rajan–Nagendra	S. Janaki, A. L. Raghavan & S. V. Ponnusamy
1962	Annai	Tamil	Ore Oru Oorile	R. Sudarsanam	T. M. Soundararajan & L. R. Eswari
1962	Azhagu Nila	Tamil	Aattam Aadadho Paattu Paadadho	K. V. Mahadevan	P. Susheela & K. Jamuna Rani
1962	Deivathin Deivam	Tamil	Kannanum Driverum Onnu	G. Ramanathan	Renuka
1962	Ethaiyum Thangum Ithaiyam	Tamil	Kannum Kannum Kalandhadhanaal Kaadhale	T. R. Pappa	S. Janaki
1962	Indira En Selvam	Tamil	Aadi Aadi Enna Kandaai	C. N. Pandurangan & H. R. Padmanabha Sastri	
1962	Kavitha	Tamil	Manakkum Roja My Lady	K. V. Mahadevan	K. Jamuna Rani
1962	Manithan Maravillai	Tamil	Kaadhal Yaatthirakku	Ghantasala	P. Susheela
1962	Manithan Maravillai	Tamil	Inbamaana Iravidhuve	Ghantasala	P. Susheela
1962	Naagamalai Azhagi	Tamil	Vandu Vandhu Mella Mella	S. P. Kodandapani & T. A. Mothi	K. Jamuna Rani
1962	Nenjil Or Aalayam	Tamil	Engirundhaalum Nee Vaazhga	Viswanathan–Ramamoorthy	
1962	Paarthaal Pasi Theerum	Tamil	Andru Oomai Pennallo	Viswanathan–Ramamoorthy	P. Susheela
1962	Padithaal Mattum Podhuma	Tamil	Kaalam Seidha Komalithanatthil	Viswanathan–Ramamoorthy	P. B. Sreenivas & G. K. Venkatesh
1963	Annai Illam	Tamil	Enna Illai Ennakku	K. V. Mahadevan	
1963	Iruvar Ullam	Tamil	Buddhi Sigaamani Petra Pillai	K. V. Mahadevan	L. R. Eswari
1963	Kaanchi Thalaivan	Tamil	Neermel Nadakkalam	K. V. Mahadevan	L. R. Eswari
1963	Kaithiyin Kathali	Tamil	Chitthirai Poongkodi Thendralai Marandhu	K. V. Mahadevan	Soolamangalam Rajalakshmi
1963	Kalyaniyin Kanavan	Tamil	Thottatthu Poovile Vaasam Undu	S. M. Subbaiah Naidu	Kausalya
1963	Naan Vanangum Dheivam	Tamil	Mullai Poo Manakkudhu	K. V. Mahadevan	Jikki
1963	Paar Magale Paar	Tamil	Endhan Kannai Undhan Kann Ottudhu	Viswanathan–Ramamoorthy	L. R. Eswari
1963	Vanambadi	Tamil	Nil Gavani Purappadu	K. V. Mahadevan	L. R. Eswari
1964	Amma Enge	Tamil	Paappaa Paappaa Kadhai Kelu	Vedha	
1964	Amma Enge	Tamil	Come Come Rosie	Vedha	L. R. Eswari
1964	Annapoorna	Kannada	Cheluvina Siriye Barele	Rajan–Nagendra	
1964	Bommai	Tamil	Kanna Irutthudhu Kaadhai Adaikkudhu	Veenai S. Balachander	
1964	Karuppu Panam	Tamil	Pattu Chiragukonda Chittukkuruvi Ondru	Viswanathan–Ramamoorthy	L. R. Eswari
1964	Manavatty	Malayalam	Chummaathiriyaliyaa	G. Devarajan	
1964	Rishyasringar	Tamil	Kannaal Ennai Paaru Kanna	T. V. Raju	K. Jamuna Rani
1964	Server Sundaram	Tamil	Om Namo.... Paalum Thenum Perudi Odiyadhu	Viswanathan–Ramamoorthy	S. C. Krishnan & L. R. Eswari
1964	Vazhi Piranthadu	Tamil	Veettukkaariyaa Kootti Vandhu	K. V. Mahadevan	K. Jamuna Rani
1964	Vettaikaaran	Tamil	Seettu Kattu Raajaa Raajaa	K. V. Mahadevan	L. R. Eswari
1965	Anandhi	Tamil	Vedikkaiyaaai Pozhudhu Poganum	M. S. Viswanathan	T. M. Soundararajan
1965	Enga Veetu Penn	Tamil	Keladaa Baaradha Veera Thirumagane	K. V. Mahadevan	
1965	Enga Veetu Penn	Tamil	Enakku Neethaan Maappillai	K. V. Mahadevan	K. Jamuna Rani
1965	Kaakum Karangal	Tamil	Azhagiya Rathiye	R. Sudarsanam	L. R. Eswari
1965	Kuzhandaiyum Deivamum	Tamil	Enna Vegam Nillu Baamaa	M. S. Viswanathan	T. M. Soundararajan
1965	Maganey Kel	Tamil	Mattamaana Pechu	Viswanathan–Ramamoorthy	Jikki
1965	Pandavar Vanavasam	Tamil	Mayile Ennuyir Radhiyale	Raghavan	L. R. Eswari
1965	Pazhani	Tamil	Annaachi Veeti Kattum Aambalaiyaa Neenga	Viswanathan–Ramamoorthy	T. M. Soundararajan, Seerkazhi Govindarajan, S. C. Krishnan & L. R. Eswari
1965	Poojaikku Vandha Malar	Tamil	Kaalgal Nindradhu Nindradhuthaan	Viswanathan–Ramamoorthy	L. R. Eswari
1965	Poojaikku Vandha Malar	Tamil	Thingalukku Enna Indru Thirumanamo	Viswanathan–Ramamoorthy	S. Janaki
1965	Thayin Karunai	Tamil	Netru Nadanthathu	G. K. Venkatesh	S. Janaki
1966	Anbe Vaa	Tamil	Once A Papa Met A Mama	M. S. Viswanathan	
1966	Anbe Vaa	Tamil	Ei Naadodi Naadodi	M. S. Viswanathan	T. M. Soundararajan, P. Susheela & L. R. Eswari
1966	Annavin Aasai	Tamil	Kovililae Veedu Katti	K. V. Mahadevan	T. M. Soundararajan & P. Susheela
1966	Chitthi	Tamil	Inge Dheivam Paadhi	M. S. Viswanathan	T. A. Mothi
1966	Kalithozhan	Malayalam	Ammayi Appanu Panamundenkil	G. Devarajan	
1966	Kanakachilanga	Malayalam	Polish Polish	M. S. Baburaj	
1966	Kodimalar	Tamil	Kalathu Mettu Maadu Vanthu	M. S. Viswanathan	L. R. Eswari
1966	Marakka Mudiyumaa?	Tamil	Vaanum Nilamum Veedu	T. K. Ramamoorthy	
1966	Motor Sundaram Pillai	Tamil	Kubu Kubu Kubu Kubu Naan Engine	M. S. Viswanathan	L. R. Eswari
1966	Sadhu Mirandal	Tamil	A for Apple... B for Biscuit	T. K. Ramamoorthy	L. R. Eswari, S. V. Ponnusamy, Sundar, S. N. Surendar & Lalitha
1966	Sadhu Mirandal	Tamil	Naadagame Indha Ulagam	T. K. Ramamoorthy	
1967	Adhey Kangal	Tamil	Pombala Orutthi Irundhaalaam	M. S. Viswanathan	T. M. Soundararajan
1967	Bhakta Prahlada	Tamil	Thimikida Thimikida Vaadhya	S. Rajeswara Rao	T. M. Soundararajan
1967	Engalukkum Kalam Varum	Tamil	Saami Illaamal		T. K. Ramamoorthy
1967	Lagna Pathrike	Kannada	Brahmachari Sharanada	Vijaya Bhaskar	P. B. Sreenivas
1967	Lagna Pathrike	Kannada	Seenu Subbu Subbu Seenu	Vijaya Bhaskar	P. B. Sreenivas
1967	Kandan Karunai	Tamil	Konjum Kili Kuruvi Mainaave	K. V. Mahadevan	
1967	Kandan Karunai	Tamil	Mundhum Thamizh Maalai	K. V. Mahadevan	S. C. Krishnan
1967	Kan Kanda Deivam	Tamil	Vaazhkai Embadhu Jaali	K. V. Mahadevan	S. C. Krishnan & S. V. Ponnusamy
1967	Naan Yaar Theriyuma	Tamil	Paarthadhum Kaadahalai	Shankar–Ganesh	T. M. Soundararajan
1967	Nindu Manasulu	Telugu	Ayyayyayyo Adiripotunnanu	T. V. Raju	L. R. Eswari
1967	Pattanathil Bhootham	Tamil	Ulagatthi Sirandhadhu Edhu	R. Govardhanam	T. M. Soundararajan & P. Susheela
1967	Thanga Thambi	Tamil	Aaaraaro My Daarling Aaraaro	Shankar–Ganesh	L. R. Eswari
1967	Thiruvarutchelvar	Tamil	Aatthu Vellam Kaatthirukku	K. V. Mahadevan	S. C. Krishnan, L. R. Eswari & T. M. Soundararajan
1968	Anbu Vazhi	Tamil	Vellakkaara Kutti En	M. S. Viswanathan	L. R. Eswari
1968	Andru Kanda Mugam	Tamil	Vaadaa Machchan Vaa	K. V. Mahadevan	T. M. Soundararajan
1968	Buthisaaligal	Tamil	Aattukku Vaalai Alandhu	V. Kumar	P. B. Sreenivas, K. Jamuna Rani & K. Swarna
1968	Iru Kodugal	Tamil	Moondru Thamizh Thondri Vilayaadiyadhum	V. Kumar	T. M. Soundararajan & K. Swarna
1968	Kallum Kaniyagum	Tamil	Neram Maalai Neram.... Atthaan Endru Mutthu Mutthaaga	M. S. Viswanathan	P. Susheela
1968	Lakshmi Kalyanam	Tamil	Poottaale Unnaiyum	M. S. Viswanathan	T. M. Soundararajan & L. R. Eswari
1968	Neeyum Naanum	Tamil	Utthaalakkadi Kiru Kirungudhu	M. S. Viswanathan	L. R. Eswari
1968	Nene Monaganni	Telugu	Garadi Chesestha Nene	T. V. Raju	Ghantasala
1968	Panama Pasama	Tamil	Vazhai Thandu Pola Udambu Alek	K. V. Mahadevan	K. Jamuna Rani
1968	Sarvamangala	Kannada	Cheluvina Siriye Barele	Satyam	
1968	Siritha Mugam	Tamil	Vaa Kaadhal Seidhu	Shankar–Ganesh	L. R. Eswari
1968	Soappu Seeppu Kannadi	Tamil	Yaathum Oorada	T. K. Ramamoorthy	T. M. Soundararajan
1969	Aindhu Laksham	Tamil	Kaadhalukkoru Kaalej	S. M. Subbaiah Naidu	L. R. Eswari
1969	Bhale Mastaru	Telugu	Adhigo Chinnadhi	T. V. Raju	
1969	Kula Vilakku	Tamil	Kondu Vandhaal Adhai Kondu Vaa	K. V. Mahadevan	L. R. Eswari
1969	Ponnu Mappillai	Tamil	Manamagan Azhagane	Vedha	
1969	Poova Thalaiya	Tamil	Poda Chonnaal Pottukkiren	M. S. Viswanathan	T. M. Soundararajan & Manorama
1969	Sabash Satyam	Telugu	Itu Rave Rave Bangaru Chilakamma	Sri Vijaya Krishnamurthy	L. R. Eswari
1969	Suba Dhinam	Tamil	Verenna Ninaivu	K. V. Mahadevan	T. M. Soundararajan & P. Susheela
1969	Thanga Malar	Tamil	Singapooru Thangacchi Vandhiyaa	T. G. Lingappa	S. Janaki
1969	Thanga Malar	Tamil	Kalyaana Ponnu.... Pallaakku Polave	T. G. Lingappa	L. R. Eswari
1970	Ethiroli	Tamil	Kalyanam Kalyanam	K. V. Mahadevan	L. R. Eswari
1970	Kodalu Diddina Kapuram	Telugu	Vanta Inti Prabhuvulam	T. V. Raju	S. P. Balasubrahmanyam
1970	Navagraham	Tamil	Neenga Navagraham	V. Kumar	S. V. Ponnusamy
1970	Navagraham	Tamil	Ellame Vayadhukku	V. Kumar	
1970	Navagraham	Tamil	Yaaro Andha Pakkam	V. Kumar	
1970	Sorgam	Tamil	Naalu Kaalu Sir	M. S. Viswanathan	L. R. Eswari & S. V. Ponnusamy
1970	Thirumalai Thenkumari	Tamil	Azhage Thamizhe Nee	Kunnakudi Vaidyanathan	Seerkazhi Govindarajan, Sarala, M. R. Vijaya, Manorama, Dharapuram Sundararajan & L. R. Anjali
1970	Vietnam Veedu	Tamil	My Lady Cut Body	K. V. Mahadevan	L. R. Eswari
1970	Vietnam Veedu	Tamil	Endrum Pudhidhaaga.... Ulagatthile Oruvan Ena	K. V. Mahadevan	Soolamangalam Rajalakshmi & P. Susheela
1971	Bhale Adrushtavo Adrushta	Kannada	Navu Haaduvude	Vijaya Bhaskar	P. B. Sreenivas
1971	Ilangeswaran	Tamil	Sri Ragu Raamaa	S. M. Subbaiah Naidu	
1971	Meendum Vazhven	Tamil	Unna Nenacha Konjam	M. S. Viswanathan	L. R. Eswari
1971	Sabatham	Tamil	Aatathai Aadu Puliyudan Aadu	G. K. Venkatesh	G. K. Venkatesh & L. R. Eswari
1971	Thangaikkaaga	Tamil	Angamutthu Thangamutthu	M. S. Viswanathan	
1971	Veguli Penn	Tamil	Needhaan Mohiniyo	V. Kumar	K. Swarna
1972	Kasethan Kadavulada	Tamil	Aandavan Thodangi	M. S. Viswanathan	M. S. Viswanathan & K. Veeramani
1972	Kula Gowravam	Telugu	Happy Life Kavali	T. G. Lingappa	L. R. Eswari
1972	Naa Mechida Huduga	Kannada	Cheluve Oh Cheluve	Vijaya Bhaskar	P. B. Sreenivas
1972	Mappillai Azhaippu	Tamil	Aala Thottu Thola Thottu	V. Kumar	L. R. Eswari
1972	Nawab Naarkali	Tamil	Chappaatthi Chappatthithaan Rotti Rottithaan	M. S. Viswanathan	L. R. Anjali
1972	Pillaiyo Pillai	Tamil	Gundooru Hamumanthappa Enga	M. S. Viswanathan	T. M. Soundararajan & L. R. Eswari
1972	Savalukku Savaal	Tamil	Pottadhu Konjam Thaanunga	Shankar–Ganesh	K. Jamuna Rani
1973	Bharatha Vilas	Tamil	Indhiya Naadu	M. S. Viswanathan	T. M. Soundararajan, M. S. Viswanathan, K. Veeramani, P. Susheela, L. R. Eswari & Malaysia Vasudevan
1973	Radha	Tamil	Naanum Paithiyam	M. S. Viswanathan	Thiruchi Loganathan & S. V. Ponnusamy
1973	Veettu Mappillai	Tamil	Ondru Irandu Ena	A. M. Rajah	L. R. Eswari
1974	Sumathi En Sundari	Tamil	Ellorukkum Kaalam Varum	M. S. Viswanathan	L. R. Eswari & Sai Baba
1974	Sumathi En Sundari	Tamil	Ye Pille Sachayi	M. S. Viswanathan	T. M. Soundararajan & L. R. Eswari
1976	Vaayillaa Poochchi	Tamil	Aasai Thaan Nenjin	M. S. Viswanathan	T. K. Kala
1977	Gaayathri	Tamil	Unnaithaan Azhaikkiren	Ilaiyaraaja	S. Janaki
1977	Mazhai Megam	Tamil	Oru Kodi Sugam Vandhadhu	K. V. Mahadevan	S. Janaki
1977	Odi Vilayadu Thatha	Tamil	Naadariyum Nalla Katchi	Ilaiyaraaja	
1979	Naan Nandri Solven	Tamil	Sura Meenai Paaru	Shyam	
1980	Kannil Theriyum Kadhaigal	Tamil	Naan Paatha Radhi Dhevi Enge	G. K. Venkatesh	
1980	Puthiya Adimaigal	Tamil	Megam Thanni Megam	Ilaiyaraaja	
1997	Kaadhali	Tamil	Dikki Dikki	Deva	Malaysia Vasudevan
2001	Engalukkum Kaalam Varum	Tamil	Ambilaikku Theriyum	Deva	Swarnalatha
2014	Aadama Jaichomada	Tamil	Nalla Ketukka Paadam	Sean Roldan	Sean Roldan
