= List of Tamil films of 1962 =

Post-amendment to the Tamil Nadu Entertainments Tax Act 1939 on 1 April 1958, Gross jumped to 140 per cent of Nett Commercial Taxes Department disclosed ₹2.68 crore in entertainment tax revenue for the year.

The following is a list of films produced in the Tamil film industry in India in 1962, in alphabetical order.

== 1962 ==
Title	Director	Production	Music	Cast	Release date (D-M-Y)
Aadi Perukku	K. Shankar	Madhan Theatres	A. M. Rajah	Gemini Ganesan, B. Saroja Devi, Devika, J. P. Chandrababu	20-07-1962
Aalayamani	K. Shankar	P. S. V. Pictures	Viswanathan–Ramamoorthy	Sivaji Ganesan, B. Saroja Devi, S. S. Rajendran, C. R. Vijayakumari	23-11-1962
Annai	Krishnan–Panju	AVM Productions	R. Sudarsanam	P. Bhanumathi, S. V. Ranga Rao, Haranath, Sowcar Janaki, Sachu, J. P. Chandrababu, Nagesh	15-12-1962
Asthikkoru Aanum Asaikku Oru Ponnum	K. Somu	M. L. Pictures	K. V. Mahadevan	K. Balaji, B. Saroja Devi, K. A. Thangavelu	
Avana Ivan	S. Balachander	S. B. Creations	S. Balachander	S. Balachander, Vasanthi, Lakshmi Rajyam, Javar Seetharaman	31-08-1962
Azhagu Nila	S. Raghavan	Raghavan Productions	K. V. Mahadevan	Kalyan Kumar, Malini, R. Muthuraman, Vasanthi, K. A. Thangavelu, V. K. Ramasamy	17-08-1962
Bale Pandiya	B. R. Panthulu	Padmini Pictures	Viswanathan–Ramamoorthy	Sivaji Ganesan, M. R. Radha, Devika	26-05-1962
Bandha Pasam	A. Bhimsingh	Santhi Films	Viswanathan–Ramamoorthy	Sivaji Ganesan, Gemini Ganesan, Savitri, Devika	27-10-1962
Deivathin Deivam	K. S. Gopalakrishnan	Chitra Productions	G. Ramanathan	S. S. Rajendran, C. R. Vijayakumari	28-12-1962
Ethaiyum Thangum Ithaiyam	P. Neelakantan	Udhaya Sooriyan Productions	T. R. Pappa	S. S. Rajendran, K. R. Ramasamy, C. R. Vijayakumari	
Ellorum Vazhavendum	B. V. Acharya	S. R. S. Pictures	Rajan–Nagendra	K. Balaji, M. R. Radha (Guest), S. A. Asokan, Malini, V. M. Ezhumalai, Nagesh	14-04-1962
Indira En Selvam	C. Padmanabhan	Ashoka Pictures	C. N. Pandurangan	M. R. Radha, Pandari Bai, S. A. Asokan, 'Baby' Sumangala	
Kannadi Maaligai	Samy-Mahesh	Rani Pictures	T. Bathman	T. R. Radha Rani, M. R. Radha, S. A. Asokan, T. R. Saroja, A. C. Mohan, Sukumari, V. Nagayya, S. D. Subbulakshmi, P. D. Sambandam, T. K. Sampangki,	
Kathiruntha Kangal	T. Prakash Rao	Vasumathi Pictures	Viswanathan–Ramamoorthy	Savitri, Gemini Ganesan, M. R. Radha	31-08-1962
Kavitha	T. R. Raghunath	Modern Theatres	K. V. Mahadevan	M. R. Radha, M. N. Nambiar, S. V. Ranga Rao, Rajasulochana, Pandari Bai, Pushpalatha	02-09-1962
Konjum Salangai	M. V. Raman	Raman Productions	S. M. Subbaiah Naidu	Gemini Ganesan, Savitri, Kumari Kamala	14-1-1962
Kudumba Thalaivan	M. A. Thirumugam	Devar Films	K. V. Mahadevan	M. G. Ramachandran, B. Saroja Devi, M. R. Radha	15-08-1962
Madappura	S. A. Subbaraman	B. V. N. Productions	K. V. Mahadevan	M. G. Ramachandran, B. Saroja Devi, M. R. Radha	16-02-1962
Madadhipathi Magal; Dubbed from Hindi	I. S. Johar	Shashadhar Mukherjee Productions	C. Ramchandra	Nalini Jaywant, Ajit, Ulhas, I. S. Johar, Raj Mehra, Roopmala, Leela Mishra, Mumtaz Begum, Mehmood and Rajen Haksar	
Mahaveera Bheeman	S. A. Subbaraman	M. L. Pathy; Jaikumar Pictures	M. S. Gnanamani	T. K. Bagavathi, S. A. Ashokan, P. V. Narasimha Bharathi, M. L. Pathy, Pal Sarma, E. R. Sahadevan, M. N. Sundar, S. K. Ramaraj, T. K. Sambangi, Gemini Sampath, M. R. Radha (Guest), V. Nagayya (Guest), Jayasri, L. Vijayalakshmi, T. R. Rajini, T. V. Kumudhini, T. K. Ranjitham, Sumitra, K. S. Angamuthu, Saraswathi, Kumari Jaya, Ratna	
Mangaiyar Ullam Mangatha Selvam	Vedantam Raghavayya	Anjali Pictures	P. Adinarayana Rao	Gemini Ganesan, Anjali Devi, Jayanthi (debut), M.R. Radha	09-02-1962
Manithan Maravillai	K. Kameshwara Rao	Vijaya Productions	Ghantasala	Gemini Ganesan, Savitri, A. Nageswara Rao, Jamuna, M. S. Sundari Bai, S. V. Ranga Rao, Serukalathur Sama, Raja, L. Vijayalakshmi	10-08-1962
Muthu Mandapam	A. S. A. Sami	Rajendran Pictures	K. V. Mahadevan	S. S. Rajendran, C. R. Vijayakumari	27-10-1962
Naagamalai Azhagi	G. Viswanathan	Matheswari Films	S. P. Kodandapani	Kallapart Natarajan, M. R. Radha, C. Leela, Gemini Chandra	
Neeya Naana	A. Sheshagiri Rao	Maheswari Productions	K. V. Mahadevan	C. L. Anandan, Devika, M. N. Nambiar, P. Kannamba, P. S. Veerappa, Rama Rao, O. A. K. Thevar, Nagesh, Rajasree, Manorama, Shoba	
Nenjil Or Aalayam	C. V. Sridhar	Chitralaya	Viswanathan–Ramamoorthy	Kalyan Kumar, R. Muthuraman, Devika	
Nichaya Thamboolam	B. S. Ranga	Vikram Productions	Viswanathan–Ramamoorthy	Sivaji Ganesan, Jamuna, Rajasree	09-02-1962
Paadha Kaanikkai	K. Shankar	Saravana Films	Viswanathan–Ramamoorthy	Gemini Ganesan, Savitri, Kamal Haasan	28-09-1962
Padithal Mattum Podhuma	A. Bhimsingh	Ranganathan Pictures	Viswanathan–Ramamoorthy	Sivaji Ganesan, Savitri, M. R. Radha, Rajasulochana, K. Balaji	14-04-1962
Parthal Pasi Theerum	A. Bhimsingh	AVM Productions	Viswanathan–Ramamoorthy	Sivaji Ganesan, Gemini Ganesan, Savitri, B. Saroja Devi, Sowkar Janaki, Kamal Haasan	14-01-1962
Paasam	T. R. Ramanna	R. R. Pictures	Viswanathan–Ramamoorthy	M. G. Ramachandran, M. R. Radha, B. Saroja Devi, T. R. Rajakumari	31-08-1962
Pattinathar	K. Somu	J. R. Productions	G. Ramanathan	T. M. Soundararajan, Gemini Chandra, M. R. Radha	
Pirandha Naal	K. Narayanan	Vijaya Arts Films	K. V. Mahadevan	Prem Nazir, M. N. Rajam, V. K. Ramasamy, T. K. Ramachandran, S. P. Veerasamy, Kallapart Natarajan, K. K. Perumal, Karikol Raj, Devika, Manorama, K. N. Kamalam	
Policekaran Magal	C. V. Sridhar	Chitralaya Pictures	Viswanathan–Ramamoorthy	K. Balaji, R. Muthuraman, C. R. Vijayakumari, Pushpalatha	31-08-1962
Raani Samyuktha	D. Yoganand	Saraswathy Pictures	K. V. Mahadevan	M. G. Ramachandran, Padmini, Ragini	14-01-1962
Saradha	K. S. Gopalakrishnan	A. L. S. Productions	K. V. Mahadevan	S. S. Rajendran, C. R. Vijayakumari, M. R. Radha	
Seemaan Petra Selvangal	S. Ramakrishnan	Paramu Films	T. R. Pappa	M. R. Radha, Pandari Bai, K. A. Thangavelu	
Sengamala Theevu	S. Rajendran	M. A. V. Pictures	K. V. Mahadevan	M. R. Radha, C. L. Anandan, Rajasree, Pushpalatha	
Senthamarai	A. Bhimsingh	Madras Pictures	Viswanathan–Ramamoorthy	Sivaji Ganesan, Padmini, K. R. Ramasamy, S. S. Rajendran, Lalitha, Ragini	14-09-1962
Sumaithaangi	C. V. Sridhar	Visaalakshi Films	Viswanathan–Ramamoorthy	Gemini Ganesan, Devika, R. Muthuraman, Vijayalakshmi	07-12-1962
Thayai Katha Thanayan	M. A. Thirumugam	Devar Films	K. V. Mahadevan	M. G. Ramachandran, M.R. Radha, B. Saroja Devi	13-04-1962
Thendral Veesum	B. S. Ranga	Vikram Productions	Viswanathan–Ramamoorthy	Kalyan Kumar, Prem Nazir, M. R. Radha, Krishna Kumari, Rajasree	07-09-1962
Vadivukku Valai Kappu	A. P. Nagarajan	Sri Lakshmi Pictures	K. V. Mahadevan	Sivaji Ganesan, Savitri, M. N. Rajam	07-07-1962
Valar Pirai	D. Yoganand	Padma Films	K.V. Mahadevan	Sivaji Ganesan, B. Saroja Devi, M. R. Radha	30-03-1962
Veera Thirumagan	A. C. Tirulokchandar	AVM Productions	Viswanathan–Ramamoorthy	C. L. Anandan, Sachu, E. V. Saroja	03-05-1962
Vikramaadhithan	T. R. Raghunath & N. S. Ramadas	Jaya Bharat Productions	S. Rajeswara Rao	M. G. Ramachandran, Padmini, Sriranjani	27-10-1962
