= S. C. Krishnan =

Indian actor and playback singer

- Born: Sivaganga Chelvam Achary Krishnan; 1929
- Died: 1983 (aged 53–54)
- Occupation: Musician
- Known for: Playback singer
- Children: 2 daughters, 1 son
- Parent: Chellam Achary

S. C. Krishnan (1929–1983) was an Indian actor and playback singer who worked mainly in Tamil dramas and films.

== Early life ==
He was born into a Saurashtra family as the fourth son of a jeweller Chelvam Achary in Sivaganga that was part of Ramnad district at that time. He joined T. K. S. Brothers drama troupe in 1937 and started acting as a child artiste. He also acted in dramas staged by N. S. Krishnan and K. R. Ramasamy. He acted in C. N. Annadurai's Velaikari and Or Iravu dramas that were later made into films.

== Career ==
S. C. Krishnan was then a teenage member of actor K.R.Ramaswamy's Krishnan Drama Sabha drama troupe. The name of the troupe derived from popular comedian N. S. Krishnan. But, when reaching 20, he was disappointed that he didn't receive adequate opportunities for acting in movies. As such, he had suddenly quit this drama troupe and joined Modern Theatres studio as a paid actor.

He joined Modern Theatres in 1949 as an artist on a monthly salary and featured in many of their films. But later on he began singing for films and sang many memorable songs. He first sang for the film Kalyani produced by Modern Theatres. The solo Kalapadam Kalapadam became a hit. He is well talented in classical Carnatic music but unfortunately producers and music directors made him to lend voice mostly for comedians. However, there is one song Thathuva Kalaiyudan in Amudhavalli that he sang along with T. R. Mahalingam. The sequence was a music competition and it gave him an opportunity to show his talent in classical music.

Aayi Mahamaayi Angkaara Dheviye from the film Rajarajan is the only song he sang for M. G. Ramachandran . The lyric for this song was written by N.M. Muthukoothan, a trusted lyricist of MGR, who also acted as an assistant to MGR in the filmed song sequence. Likewise he has sung only one song for Sivaji Ganesan, that is from the film Raja Rani beginning Leelaa, laalee, adhu polee.

He worked as a music director in Chennai Television (Doordarshan) Kendra for some time.

=== Music composers he sang for ===
Many music directors gave him memorable songs, including K. V. Mahadevan, Viswanathan–Ramamoorthy, G. Ramanathan, S. M. Subbaiah Naidu, Ghantasala, C. N. Pandurangan, S. V. Venkatraman, T. R. Pappa, G. Govindarajulu Naidu, T. G. Lingappa, S. Dakshinamurthi, S. Rajeswara Rao, S. Hanumantha Rao, T. R. Ramanathan, R. Sudarsanam, R. Govardhanam, Vedha, H. R. Padmanabha Sastri, M. K. Athmanathan, V. T. Rajagopalan, M. S. Gnanamani, Pendyala Nageswara Rao, P. Adinarayana Rao, M. Ranga Rao, K. Prasad Rao, K. H. Reddy, T. M. Ibrahim, Master Venu, T. V. Raju, V. Kumar, Shankar–Ganesh and M. S. Viswanathan.

=== Playback singers he sang with ===
He had many solo songs but also sang with other singers. He was very popular with comedy songs. He sang immemorable the most number of comedy duets with A. G. Rathnamala, the next is with L. R. Eswari and followed by K. Jamuna Rani.

He also sang duets with female singers with most notably with T. V. Rathnam, Jikki, A. P. Komala, Soolamangalam Rajalakshmi, K. Rani, S. Janaki, P. Leela, M. S. Rajeswari, N. L. Ganasaraswathi, U. R. Chandra, Vadivambal, P. Suseela, G. Kasthoori, Swarnalatha, K. Swarna, L. R. Anjali, T. K. Kala, Manorama, C. Gomathi, Ponnammal, S. J. Kantha, Udutha Sarojini & Pathma.

He also sang with other male singers such as T. M. Soundararajan, Seerkazhi Govindarajan, Ghantasala, Thiruchi Loganathan, A. M. Rajah, T. A. Mothi, T. R. Mahalingam & Nagore E. M. Hanifa.

He sang with all other comedy singers too such as J. P. Chandrababu, N. S. Krishnan, K. Sarangapani, A. L. Raghavan, V. T. Rajagopalan, K. Chellamutthu, S. V. Ponnusamy, M. M. Muthu, Krishnamoorthy, C. Thangappan & Maadhavan.

== Awards and Felicitations ==
He was bestowed with Kalaimamani award in 1981 by the Tamil Nadu State government.

== Personal life ==
He had a wife (Pushpavalli), a son (S.C.K.Selladurai) and two daughters (Manonmani, Uma rani). He was a good friend of actor and singer T. R. Mahalingam. While he was working for the TV station he was affected by paralysis. He suffered for about 4 years and died in 1983.

== Discography ==
Year	Film	Language	Song	Music Director	Co-Singer
1950	Swapna Sundari	Tamil	Kobameno En Mele	C. R. Subburaman & Ghantasala	
1952	Kalyani	Tamil	Uladamidhuve Ulagamappaa	G. Ramanathan & S. Dakshinamurthi	K. Rani
1952	Valaiyapathi	Tamil	Alli Alli Alli	S. Dakshinamurthi	K. Rani
1953	Thirumbi Paar	Tamil	Kalappadam Kalappadam Engum Edhilum Kalappadam	G. Ramanathan	
1953	Thirumbi Paar	Tamil	Vaazhkkai Vaazhvadharkke	G. Ramanathan	
1954	Pudhu Yugam	Tamil	Paramparai Panakkaaran Pole	G. Ramanathan	T. M. Soundararajan & V. T. Rajagopalan
1954	Ratha Paasam	Tamil	Aiyappaa Idhu Meiyappaa	M. K. Athmanathan & A. V. Natarajan	
1954	Sugam Enge	Tamil	Raasipalan Ungal Raasipalan	Viswanathan–Ramamoorthy	
1954	Sugam Enge	Tamil	Santhosham Venumendraal Jolly Venunga	Viswanathan–Ramamoorthy	
1955	Asai Anna Arumai Thambi	Tamil	Pizhaikkum Vazhi	K. V. Mahadevan	P. Susheela, K. V. Mahadevan, Thodi Kannan, Udutha Sarojini & M. S. Padma
1955	Asai Anna Arumai Thambi	Tamil	Adhistam Romba Adhistam	K. V. Mahadevan	P. Susheela
1955	Gulebakavali	Tamil	Naayagame Nabi Naayagame	Viswanathan–Ramamoorthy	Nagore E. M. Hanifa
1955	Guna Sundari	Tamil	Aandavan Kattalaiyai.... Indha Ulagame Naadaga Medaiyadaa	Ghantasala	Ghantasala & Seerkazhi Govindarajan
1955	Guna Sundari	Tamil	Therindhu Kolluveer Therindhu Kolluveer	Ghantasala	K. Rani
1955	Guna Sundari	Tamil	Adhuve Edhiril Varuvadharkkulle	Ghantasala	Seerkazhi Govindarajan
1955	Kathanayaki	Tamil	Ammammaa Aagaadhu Aavesam Koodadhu	G. Ramanathan	K. Rani
1955	Kathanayaki	Tamil	Pasi Pasi Pasi Parama Yezhaigalin	G. Ramanathan	K. Rani
1955	Kathanayaki	Tamil	Idli Saambaar, Namma Idli Saambaar	G. Ramanathan	
1955	Kathanayaki	Tamil	Adho Varugiran (Sathiyavan Natagam)	G. Ramanathan	
1955	Kathanayaki	Tamil	Alolam Alolam" (Sri Valli Natagam)	G. Ramanathan	Swarnalatha
1955	Maheswari	Tamil	Sonnaa Podhum Kannaale	G. Ramanathan	A. G. Rathnamala
1955	Maheswari	Tamil	Janakku Janakku Jinjanakku	G. Ramanathan	A. G. Rathnamala
1955	Maheswari	Tamil	Mundhi Mundhi Vinaayagane	G. Ramanathan	A. G. Rathnamala
1955	Maheswari	Tamil	Aagaaya Veediyile Annaandhu Paathapadi	G. Ramanathan	A. G. Rathnamala
1955	Mangaiyar Thilakam	Tamil	Purindhu Kollavillai Innum	S. Dakshinamurthi	A. G. Rathnamala
1955	Mangaiyar Thilakam	Tamil	Adanga Pidaari Naadagam	S. Dakshinamurthi	T. V. Rathnam, Vadivambal & S. J. Kantha
1955	Pennarasi	Tamil	Chandhiran Madhiyam.... Paadhaiyin Mele Vizhiyaai Vaitthu	K. V. Mahadevan	Thiruchi Loganathan, M. S. Rajeswari & U. R. Chandra
1955	Pennarasi	Tamil	Netthiyila Neela Nira Pottu	K. V. Mahadevan	U. R. Chandra
1955	Pennarasi	Tamil	Thodaadhe Thodaadhe	K. V. Mahadevan	U. R. Chandra
1955	Porter Kandan	Tamil	Ezhudhichellum Vidhiyin.... Varundhaadhe Maname Veene	Viswanathan–Ramamoorthy	
1955	Porter Kandan	Tamil	Kondattam Kondattam Panam Undaanaal	Viswanathan–Ramamoorthy	Thiruchi Loganathan, K. Chellamutthu, Maadhavan & K. Rani
1955	Town Bus	Tamil	Leda Lady Aruginil	K. V. Mahadevan	Seerkazhi Govindarajan & U. R. Chandra
1955	Town Bus	Tamil	Poongavaname Nee Purinji	K. V. Mahadevan	U. R. Chandra
1956	Alibabavum 40 Thirudargalum	Tamil	Chinnanjiru Chitte Endhan Cheena Karkande	S. Dakshinamurthi	Jikki
1956	Amara Deepam	Tamil	Kottai Katti Kaavi Katti	T. Chalapathi Rao & G. Ramanathan	A. P. Komala
1956	Jaya Gopi	Tamil		Viswanathan–Ramamoorthy	
1956	Kokilavani	Tamil	Jilu Jilu Mittaai Paarungo	G. Ramanathan	
1956	Kokilavani	Tamil	Uunuyirgal Ullamellaam	G. Ramanathan	
1956	Marma Veeran	Tamil	Anbirukkudhu Arivirukkudhu Panbirukkudhu	Vedha	A. M. Rajah & T. A. Mothi
1956	Marma Veeran	Tamil	O Aiyaa O Ammaa	Vedha	J. P. Chandrababu, Jikki & K. Rani
1956	Maya Mohini	Tamil	Munnalae Anbaaai Aadi Vandhaanga	T. Chalapathi Rao	
1956	Maya Mohini	Tamil	Kumari Kutti Manasai	T. Chalapathi Rao	
1956	Naane Raja	Tamil	Vel Muruga.... Aaanai Mugan Thambi	T. R. Ramanathan	T. M. Soundararajan
1956	Naga Panjami	Tamil	Vaasam Pidippathai.... Naattukku Naadu Mattam		A. P. Komala
1956	Paditha Penn	Tamil	Kannaana Selvame Ponnaana	Arun, Raghavan	
1956	Raja Rani	Tamil	Leelaa .. Kannatra.... Poonai Kannai Moodikondaal	T. R. Pappa	
1956	Rambaiyin Kaadhal	Tamil	Podu Dakku Mukku Dakku Thaalam	T. R. Pappa	Jikki
1956	Sadhaaram	Tamil	Kaayam Karuvappillai Choodandi	G. Ramanathan	K. Sarangapani
1956	Thaaikkuppin Thaaram	Tamil	Vittadhadi Aasai.... Eravittu Eni Edukkum	K. V. Mahadevan	A. G. Rathnamala
1956	Thaaikkuppin Thaaram	Tamil	Thandhaavaram Thandhaaluvaan Thiruchendhooril	K. V. Mahadevan	A. G. Rathnamala
1956	Vetri Veeran	Tamil	Nilai Thannai Ariyave	T. M. Ibrahim	P. Susheela
1957	Aandi Petra Selvam	Tamil	Jeppilor Bommai	S. Rajeswara Rao	
1957	Baagyavathi	Tamil	Kannaale Vettaadhe Summa Kannaale Vettaadhe	S. Dakshinamurthi	T. V. Rathnam
1957	Baagyavathi	Tamil	Vennilavin Olithanile	S. Dakshinamurthi	A. M. Rajah & T. V. Rathnam
1957	Baagyavathi	Tamil	Pombalainga Therinju Kollanum	S. Dakshinamurthi	
1957	Bhaktha Markandeya	Tamil	Naragam Idhudhaan	Viswanathan–Ramamoorthy	K. Jamuna Rani
1957	Bhaktha Markandeya	Tamil	Miyaaw Miyaaw Miyaaw	Viswanathan–Ramamoorthy	
1957	Chakravarthi Thirumagal	Tamil	Un Atthaanum Nanthaane	G. Ramanathan	T. V. Rathnam
1957	Engal Veettu Mahalakshmi	Tamil	Mannai Nambi Maram Irukku	Master Venu	Jikki
1957	Kadan Vaangi Kalyaanam	Tamil	Kaasikku Ponene Raamaahari	S. Rajeswara Rao	A. G. Rathnamala
1957	Kadan Vaangi Kalyaanam	Tamil	Akkaa Magale....Thootthukkudi Saatthukkudi	S. Rajeswara Rao	A. G. Rathnamala
1957	Karpukkarasi	Tamil	Nal Vaakku Nee Kodadi	G. Ramanathan	A. G. Rathnamala
1957	Makkalai Petra Magarasi	Tamil	Adi Thaaraapuram Thaambaram	K. V. Mahadevan	A. G. Rathnamala
1957	Makkalai Petra Magarasi	Tamil	Seemaikku Poi Padichchavaru	K. V. Mahadevan	A. P. Komala
1957	Mallika	Tamil	Maanatthai Kaappadhum Ponnu	T. R. Pappa	Jikki
1957	Mallika	Tamil	Pagattile Ulagam Emaarudhu	T. R. Pappa	
1957	Manaalane Mangaiyin Baakkiyam	Tamil	Evanndaa Nam Munne	P. Adinarayana Rao	
1957	Maya Bajaar	Tamil	Thangame Un Pole Thanga Padhumaiyai	Ghantasala & S. Rajeswara Rao	dialogues by K. Savithri
1957	Maya Bajaar	Tamil	Dhayai Seiveere Dhayai Seiveere	Ghantasala & S. Rajeswara Rao	Seerkazhi Govindarajan, G. Kasthoori & K. Rani
1957	Raja Rajan	Tamil	Aala Pirandha Raajaapaadu	K. V. Mahadevan	Vadivambal
1957	Raja Rajan	Tamil	Haiyahoo Jingadi Jayya	K. V. Mahadevan	Thiruchi Loganathan & Vadivambal
1957	Raja Rajan	Tamil	Kaththinaale Kaariyam Saadhikka	K. V. Mahadevan	Vadivambal
1957	Raja Rajan	Tamil	Vettaiyaada Vaarum Mannava	K. V. Mahadevan	Thiruchi Loganathan & Vadivambal
1957	Raja Rajan	Tamil	Aayi Mahamaayi Angkaara Dheviye	K. V. Mahadevan	
1957	Rani Lalithangi	Tamil	Bul Bul Jodi Majaa	G. Ramanathan	T. V. Rathnam
1957	Rathnagiri Rahasya	Kannada		T. G. Lingappa	
1957	Samaya Sanjeevi	Tamil	Veliya Sonnaa Vetkam	G. Ramanathan	
1957	Sathi Anusooya	Tamil	Gadhi Neeye Gangaa Bavaani	Ghantasala	
1957	Soubhagyavathi	Tamil	Manjal Poosi Poo Mudicchu	Pendyala Nageswara Rao & M. S. Gnanamani	T. V. Rathnam
1957	Thangamalai Ragasiyam	Tamil	Thandhanatthaan Dhamukkaditthaan	T. G. Lingappa	K. Rani
1957	Vanangamudi	Tamil		G. Ramanathan	T. V. Rathnam
1957	Yaar Paiyyan	Tamil	Palapalapala Jilujilujilu	S. Dakshinamurthi	C. Gomathi, C. Thangappan & Ponnammal
1958	Athisaya Thirudan	Tamil	Kola Kola Kolayaai Mundharikaa	S. Dakshinamurthi & K. Prasad Rao	
1958	Boologa Rambai	Tamil	Om Endra Pranavatthin.... Kalli Malai Kurinji Nilam	C. N. Pandurangan	Thiruchi Loganathan, Jikki & A. G. Rathnamala
1958	Engal Kudumbam Perisu	Tamil	Naanum Neeyum Jodi	T. G. Lingappa	Soolamangalam Rajalakshmi
1958	Kaathavaraayan	Tamil	Kumkaara Kuppanna	G. Ramanathan	A. G. Rathnamala, K. Jamuna Rani, K. Rani & Sundaramma
1958	Kaathavaraayan	Tamil	Sangili Jingili.... Vaarandi Vaaraandi Kutticchaatthaan	G. Ramanathan	J. P. Chandrababu, A. G. Rathnamala & T. M. Soundararajan
1958	Manamulla Maruthaaram	Tamil	Vaanga Amma Vaanga Valaiyal	K. V. Mahadevan	L. R. Eswari
1958	Mangalya Bhagyam	Tamil	Kanne Sella Thaaraa	G. Ramanathan	P. Leela
1958	Maya Manithan	Tamil	Achaa Pyaari Pombale	G. Govindarajulu Naidu	S. Janaki
1958	Neelamalai Thirudan	Tamil	Vetthala Paakku Sunnaambu Patthiri Elam Kiraambu	K. V. Mahadevan	A. G. Rathnamala
1958	Neelamalai Thirudan	Tamil	Onnukku Rendaachu Ubatthiravatthukku	K. V. Mahadevan	A. G. Rathnamala
1958	Naan Valartha Thangai	Tamil	Ottu Maambazhathai Pole	Pendyala Nageswara Rao	Jikki
1958	Petra Maganai Vitra Annai	Tamil	Dhil Rapsaa Panraango	Viswanathan–Ramamoorthy	A. G. Rathnamala
1958	Sampoorna Ramayanam	Tamil	Sree Raamachandiran Magudaabishega Thirukkolam Kaanbathatke	K. V. Mahadevan	Seerkazhi Govindarajan
1958	Sampoorna Ramayanam	Tamil	Mannellaam Ponnaagum Raaman Varavaaley	K. V. Mahadevan	A. P. Komala, A. G. Rathnamala, K. Rani, Udutha Sarojini & M. S. Pathma
1958	Sarangadhara	Tamil	Periya Idatthu Vishayam Ippadi Irukku	G. Ramanathan	A. P. Komala
1958	Sarangadhara	Tamil	Megaththirai Pilandhu Minnalai Pol Nuzhaindhu	G. Ramanathan	T. M. Soundararajan & V. T. Rajagopalan
1958	Thirudargal Jakkirathai	Tamil	Poiyaa Naina Poiyaa	K. V. Mahadevan	
1958	Thedi Vandha Selvam	Tamil	Platform Mattaminnu Ennaatheenga	T. G. Lingappa	
1958	Zimbo	Tamil	Ullaasama Jalsaa Seydhe	Vijaya Bhaskar	
1959	Abalai Anjugam	Tamil	Keezhe Bhoomi, Maele Vaanam	K. V. Mahadevan	A. L. Raghavan & P. Leela
1959	Alli Petra Pillai	Tamil	Paisaavai Pottu Naisaaga Vaangi	K. V. Mahadevan	
1959	Amudhavalli	Tamil	Iyal Isai Naadaga Kalaiyile	Viswanathan–Ramamoorthy	T. R. Mahalingam
1959	Annaiyin Aanai	Tamil	Enna Saami Ennai Appadi Paarkire	S. M. Subbaiah Naidu	A. G. Rathnamala & Seergazhi Govindarajan
1959	Aval Yaar	Tamil	Adakkiduven	S. Rajeswara Rao	T. V. Rathnam
1959	Azhagarmalai Kalvan	Tamil	Padhungi Ninnu Paayum Vengai	B. Gopalam	A. P. Komala
1959	Azhagarmalai Kalvan	Tamil	Mai Ezhudhi Pottumittu	B. Gopalam	K. Rani
1959	Kalaivaanan	Tamil	Vennaiyai Thirudi Thindru	Pendyala Nageswara Rao	S. Janaki
1959	Kan Thiranthathu	Tamil	Oho Oru Kuraiyum Seiyaame.... Irukkum Pozhudhai Rasikkanum	V. T. Rajagopalan	Seerkazhi Govindarajan & K. Jamuna Rani
1959	Kan Thiranthathu	Tamil	Kann Thiranthathu.... Pudhu Vaazhvu Pervuvomada	V. T. Rajagopalan	Seerkazhi Govindarajan, K. Jamuna Rani & P. Susheela
1959	Mamiyar Mechina Marumagal	Tamil	Oru Patthu Maadham	R. Sudarsanam	T. M. Soundararajan
1959	Manjal Mahimai	Tamil	My Dear Meena Un Idea Enna	Master Venu	Jikki
1959	Manjal Mahimai	Tamil	Aanadhu Aachu Ponadhu Pochu	Master Venu	Jikki
1959	Minnal Veeran	Tamil	Kokkarakko.... Kutta Veliyaakavaa	Vedha	T. V. Rathnam
1959	Minnal Veeran	Tamil	Thillatangu Taangu	Vedha	G. Kasthoori
1959	Naalu Veli Nilam	Tamil	Kulippen Paneerile	K. V. Mahadevan & M. K. Athmanathan	K. Jamuna Rani
1959	Naalu Veli Nilam	Tamil	Unnai Thedi Vandhen	K. V. Mahadevan & M. K. Athmanathan	K. Jamuna Rani
1959	Panchaali	Tamil	Namma Naattu Vaithiyathai	K. V. Mahadevan	Thiruchi Loganathan
1959	President Panchatcharam	Tamil	Azhagu Raani Ponne	G. Ramanathan	K. Jamuna Rani & V. T. Rajagopalan
1959	Orey Vazhi	Tamil	Pananaadhaa	R. Govardhanam	T. M. Soundararajan
1959	Orey Vazhi	Tamil	Pirandhu Vandhadhum	R. Govardhanam	
1959	Orey Vazhi	Tamil	Karuppu Kudaiyin Keezh	R. Govardhanam	
1959	Raja Malaiya Simman	Tamil	Paadhaiyil Naam Kannai Vachu.... Aasai Maama En Aasai Maamaa	Viswanathan–Ramamoorthy	L. R. Eswari
1959	Raja Malaiya Simman	Tamil	Naadu Sezhippadhellaam.... Idhanaale Idhanaale	Viswanathan–Ramamoorthy	S. Janaki
1959	Raja Sevai	Tamil	Kaadai Kaudhaarigale Eppamidum Kaattu Poonai	T. V. Raju	S. Janaki
1959	Raja Sevai	Tamil	Omkaara Kaali Bathrakaali	T. V. Raju	
1959	Sabash Ramu	Tamil	Hello Darling Parandhodi Vaa	T. M. Ibrahim	Jikki
1959	Sollu Thambi Sollu	Tamil	Vattamittu Ennai Kettalaiya	K. V. Mahadevan	
1959	Sollu Thambi Sollu	Tamil	Nere Ennai Nimirnthu	K. V. Mahadevan	L. R. Eswari
1959	Sumangali	Tamil	Akkaa Magale Chutti Ponne	M. Ranga Rao	A. G. Rathnamala
1959	Sumangali	Tamil	Manidhanaagave Pirandhadhu Mannil Edhukku Theriyumaa	M. Ranga Rao	Seerkazhi Govindarajan
1959	Thalai Koduthaan Thambi	Tamil	Kalaigalil Raajaa	Viswanathan–Ramamoorthy	K. Jamuna Rani
1959	Thalai Koduthaan Thambi	Tamil	Anaivarum Karutthudan Katpeere	Viswanathan–Ramamoorthy	Seerkazhi Govindarajan & N. L. Ganasaraswathi
1959	Thalai Koduthaan Thambi	Tamil	Panneeril Thalai Muzhugi	Viswanathan–Ramamoorthy	Seerkazhi Govindarajan & N. L. Ganasaraswathi
1959	Thalai Koduthaan Thambi	Tamil	Thalai Kodutthaan Thambi	Viswanathan–Ramamoorthy	Seerkazhi Govindarajan & N. L. Ganasaraswathi
1959	Thamarai Kulam	Tamil		H. Padmanabha Sastri and T. A. Mothi	
1959	Thanga Padhumai	Tamil	Poomalai Pottu Pona Mama	Viswanathan–Ramamoorthy	A. G. Rathnamala
1959	Ulagam Sirikkiradhu	Tamil	En Veettu Naai.... Tippu Kodutthu Tippu Kodutthu	S. Dakshinamurthi	A. L. Raghavan
1959	Uzhavukkum Thozhilukkum Vandhanai Seivom	Tamil	Uzhavukkum Thozhilukkum Vandhanai Seivom	K. V. Mahadevan	L. R. Eswari
1959	Uzhavukkum Thozhilukkum Vandhanai Seivom	Tamil	Kobikkiraappula Kobichukkaadhe Kannu	K. V. Mahadevan	A. G. Rathnamala
1959	Uzhavukkum Thozhilukkum Vandhanai Seivom	Tamil	Kaai Kaai Avaraikkaai	K. V. Mahadevan	A. L. Raghavan
1959	Vaazha Vaitha Deivam	Tamil	Kolli Malai Saaralile	K. V. Mahadevan	L. R. Eswari
1959	Vannakili	Tamil	Saathukkudi Chaaru Thaana Paartthu Kudi	K. V. Mahadevan	A. G. Rathnamala
1959	Vannakili	Tamil	Chithaadai Kattikittu Singaaram Pannikkittu	K. V. Mahadevan	P. Susheela
1960	Adutha Veettu Penn	Tamil	Kaiyum Odala Kaalum Odala	P. Adinarayana Rao	T. V. Rathnam
1960	Deivapiravi	Tamil	Kattadathukku	R. Sudarsanam	L. R. Eswari
1960	Irumanam Kalanthal Thirumanam	Tamil	Pattu Seylai Vaangi Thaaren	S. Dakshinamurthi	A. G. Rathnamala
1960	Ivan Avanethan	Tamil	Edhu Nijam Edhu Poi	M. Ranga Rao	M. S. Rajeswari
1960	Ivan Avanethan	Tamil	Sembattu Veytti Katti	M. Ranga Rao	
1960	Kairasi	Tamil	Poologam Maarinaalum	R. Govardhanam	L. R. Eswari
1960	Kalathur Kannamma	Tamil	Unnai Kandu Mayangaadha Mirugamundo	R. Sudarsanam	M. S. Rajeswari, T. M. Soundararajan & A. P. Komala
1960	Mannadhi Mannan	Tamil	Kaaduthazhaikka.... Kanniyar Perumai	Viswanathan–Ramamoorthy	P. Leela
1960	Mannadhi Mannan	Tamil	Paadupattaa Thannaale	Viswanathan–Ramamoorthy	
1960	Nagatthil Zimbo	Tamil	Ullaasamaa Jalsaa Seidhe	Vijaya Bhaskar	
1960	Ondrupattal Undu Vazhvu	Tamil	Kalangaadhe Kavalaipadaadhe	Viswanathan–Ramamoorthy	Seerkazhi Govindarajan, K. Jamuna Rani & L. R. Eswari
1960	Ondrupattal Undu Vazhvu	Tamil	Ellorum Inaattu Mannavare	Viswanathan–Ramamoorthy	T. M. Soundararajan & Jikki
1960	Pattaliyin Vetri	Tamil	Singaara Bommai	S. Rajeswara Rao & Master Venu	Jikki
1960	Sivagami	Tamil	Kottum Sootrtum Maatikkittu	K. V. Mahadevan	A. G. Rathnamala
1960	Thanthaikku Pin Thamaiyan	Tamil	Pozhaikka Theriya Venum	K. V. Mahadevan	L. R. Eswari
1960	Thilakam	Tamil	Sandhegam Enum Oru Sarakku	R. Sudarsanam	Soolamangalam Rajalakshmi
1960	Thilakam	Tamil	B.O.Y. Boy Ena Paiyan G.I.R.L. Girl Ena Ponnu	R. Sudarsanam	Soolamangalam Rajalakshmi
1960	Thilakam	Tamil	Aayi Mahamaayi Perai Cholli	R. Sudarsanam	L. R. Eswari & Soolamangalam Rajalakshmi
1960	Thilakam	Tamil	Karagam Karagam Karagam	R. Sudarsanam	Soolamangalam Rajalakshmi
1960	Thilakam	Tamil	Inneram Ennai Seidhe	R. Sudarsanam	L. R. Eswari
1960	Thilakam	Tamil	Thanjavoor Karagamadi Oh Mariammaa	R. Sudarsanam	L. R. Eswari, Soolamangalam Rajalakshmi & T. M. Soundararajan
1960	Uthami Petra Rathinam	Tamil	Annammaa Ennammaa Sollure	T. Chalapathi Rao	Jikki
1960	Vijayapuri Veeran	Tamil	Kokkarichu Koodu Paayum	T. R. Pappa	T. V. Rathnam & L. R. Eswari
1960	Vijayapuri Veeran	Tamil	Aasai Machchaan Visuvaasa Machchaan	T. R. Pappa	S. Janaki
1961	Arabu Naattu Azhagi	Tamil	Aasaiyaale Theduraaru Aiyyaa	Vijaya Bhaskar	S. V. Ponnusamy & L. R. Eswari
1961	Arasilangkumari	Tamil	Thoondiyile Maattikkittu	G. Ramanathan	Seerkazhi Govindarajan & K. Jamuna Rani
1961	Arasilangkumari	Tamil	Setthaalum Unnai Naan Vida Maatten	G. Ramanathan	N. S. Krishnan
1961	Bhagyalakshmi	Tamil	Paarttheera Aiyaa Paarttheeraa	Viswanathan–Ramamoorthy	L. R. Eswari
1961	Ennai Paar	Tamil	Chinna Ponne Ennai Paarthu	T. G. Lingappa	K. Jamuna Rani
1961	Mamiyarum Oru Veetu Marumagale	Tamil	Vetti Vambu Engalukkul	Pendyala Nageswara Rao	A. G. Rathnamala
1961	Manapanthal	Tamil	Ammaavukku Manasukkulle	Viswanathan–Ramamoorthy	L. R. Eswari
1961	Thirudadhe	Tamil	Achcha Baahuthachcha	S. M. Subbaiah Naidu	A. G. Rathnamala
1961	Thooya Ullam	Tamil	Kaaleju Maanavar Vaazhkkaiyile	Pendyala Nageshwara Rao	T. M. Soundararajan
1961	Thooya Ullam	Tamil	Om Nama Paarvathi Pathe .. Pillaiye Illennaa	Pendyala Nageshwara Rao	Udutha Sarojini
1961	Veera Kumar	Tamil	Ponne Ponnendru	Rajan–Nagendra	S. Janaki, A. L. Raghavan & S. V. Ponnusamy
1961	Yar Manamagan	Tamil	Konjam Siringa, Konjam Siringa	Br Lakshmanan	K. Jamuna Rani
1962	Indira En Selvam	Tamil	Kaadhalukku Kaaleju Enge Irukku	C. N. Pandurangan & H. R. Padmanabha Sastri	A. G. Rathnamala
1962	Konjum Salangai	Tamil	Dhinamidhuve Dhinamidhuve	S. M. Subbaiah Naidu	
1962	Konjum Salangai	Tamil	Vel Eduppome Vetri Vel	S. M. Subbaiah Naidu	
1962	Nichaya Thaamboolam	Tamil	Alangaaram Alangaaram Neethaan	Viswanathan–Ramamoorthy	L. R. Eswari
1962	Pirandhanaal	Tamil	Jaan Pillai Aanaalum Aan Pillai	K. V. Mahadevan	L. R. Eswari
1962	Rathna Manjari	Tamil	Yaaru Yaaru Nee Yaaru	Rajan–Nagendra	L. R. Eswari
1962	Thendral Veesum	Tamil	Aambala Manasu Aasaiyinaale	Viswanathan–Ramamoorthy	L. R. Eswari
1964	Magaley Un Samathu	Tamil	Sirayila Oru Kuray Illai	G. K. Venkatesh	T. A. Mothi
1964	Navarathri	Tamil	Thanga Jarigai Selai Engum Palapalakka	K. V. Mahadevan	T. M. Soundararajan & P. Susheela
1964	Rishyasringar	Tamil	Vasandhamum Thendralum Vaazhndhidave	T. V. Raju	A. P. Komala
1964	Server Sundaram	Tamil	Om Namo.... Paalum Thenum Perugi Odiyadhu	Viswanathan–Ramamoorthy	A. L. Raghavan & L. R. Eswari
1964	Veera Pandiyan	Tamil	Madhurai Koyil Pole Maamani Kovai Pole	Rajan–Nagendra	L. R. Eswari
1964	Veera Sankalpa	Kannada	Yuddha Yuddha Yuddha	Rajan–Nagendra	
1965	Pazhani	Tamil	Annaachi Veeti Kattum Aambalaiyaa Neenga	Viswanathan–Ramamoorthy	T. M. Soundararajan, Seerkazhi Govindarajan, A. L. Raghavan & L. R. Eswari
1965	Poomalai	Tamil	Baadhaam Keer.... Raani Diamond Raani	R. Sudarsanam	L. R. Eswari
1966	Naam Moovar	Tamil	Naanoru Pakkam	S. M. Subbaiah Naidu	L. R. Eswari
1966	Navaratri	Telugu	Raju Vedale Sabhaku	T. Chalapathi Rao	Ghantasala, Savitri, Ramu, Seetaram & Nalla Ram Murthy
1966	Sadhu Mirandal	Tamil	Pattali Thozhilalarkalai	T. K. Ramamoorthy	L. R. Eswari
1967	Kandan Karunai	Tamil	Mundhum Thamizh Maalai	K. V. Mahadevan	A. L. Raghavan
1967	Kan Kanda Deivam	Tamil	Vaazhkai Enbadhu Jaali	K. V. Mahadevan	A. L. Raghavan & S. V. Ponnusamy
1967	Sabash Thambi	Tamil	Aambala Singame.... Aiyaadiyo Aiyaadiyo	S. M. Subbaiah Naidu	L. R. Eswari
1967	Thiruvarutchelvar	Tamil	Aatthu Vellam Kaatthirukku	K. V. Mahadevan	A. L. Raghavan, L. R. Eswari & T. M. Soundararajan
1968	Delhi Mapillai	Tamil	Anda Bagirandamodu	K. V. Mahadevan	S. V. Ponnusamy, L. R. Eswari & T. M. Soundararajan
1968	Ethir Neechal	Tamil	Seidhi Ketto Seidhi Ketto	V. Kumar	K. Jamuna Rani, P. Susheela & K. Swarna
1968	Harichandra	Tamil	Kattukkadangaadha Asaiyaale	K. V. Mahadevan	M. M. Muthu
1968	Thillana Mohanambal	Tamil	Paandiyan Naanirukka	K. V. Mahadevan	L. R. Eswari
1970	Vilaiyattu Pillai	Tamil	Arumugan Nambiye Aanai Mugan	K. V. Mahadevan	T. M. Soundararajan
1971	Babu	Tamil	Aadhi Mudhale	M. S. Viswanathan	T. M. Soundararajan, Seerkazhi Govindarajan & S. Janaki
1972	Kurathi Magan	Tamil	Cheenaa Chittu Jiginaa	K. V. Mahadevan	Thiruchi Loganathan, C. Thangappan & M. R. Vijaya
1972	Nawab Naarkali	Tamil	Senjikottaiyai	M. S. Viswanathan	T. M. Soundararajan & L. R. Anjali
1973	Malligai Poo	Tamil	Muruganukku Mootthavane	V. Kumar	P. Leela, K. Swarna, S. V. Ponnusamy & Seerkazhi Govindarajan
1974	Appa Amma	Tamil	Kottaiyile Kaalai Vaikkum.... Gumthalakkaa Gumari Gummaa	Shyam	T. M. Soundararajan
1974	Pudhiya Manidhan	Tamil	Vaikundam Sree Vaikundam	Shankar–Ganesh	Kovai Soundararajan
1974	Thaai Paasam	Tamil	Mutthumagam Vandhunakku Porappaan	V. Kumar	S. P. Balasubrahmanyam, S. V. Ponnusamy & Kovai Soundarajan
1976	Unakkaga Naan	Tamil	Kaadu Vetta	M. S. Viswanathan	L. R. Eswari & Manorama
1977	Palabishegham	Tamil	Kundril Aadum Kumarunukku Aragarogara	Shankar–Ganesh	Krishnamoorthy & T. K. Kala
1977	Palabishegham	Tamil	Padam Edukkira Paambu Pole	Shankar–Ganesh	T. K. Kala
1977	Raghupathi Raghavan Rajaram	Tamil	Kathazhang Kaattukulle	Shankar–Ganesh	
1978	Kanchi Kamakshi	Tamil	Omsakthi Omsakthi Omsakthi	K. S. Raghunathan	Seerkazhi Govindarajan & T. L. Maharajan
1979	Alangari	Tamil	Cheena Bommai Kannazhagi	V. Kumar	Malaysia Vasudevan & Kovai Murali
1979	Thaayillamal Naan Illai	Tamil	Vanakkam Vanakkam	Shankar–Ganesh	T. M. Soundararajan & P. Susheela
1980	Neer Nilam Neruppu	Tamil	Aththi Maratthula Muttai	Shankar–Ganesh	Ramani
1984	Kaval Kaithigal	Tamil	Azhagana Thangachiye	Shankar–Ganesh	Malaysia Vasudevan

== Bibliography ==
- Sahadevan Vijayakumar. "S. C. Krishnan — Playback Singer" (in Tamil).
- G. Neelamegam. Thiraikalanjiyam — Part 1 (in Tamil). Manivasagar Publishers, Chennai 108 (Ph:044 25361039). First edition December 2014.
- G. Neelamegam. Thiraikalanjiyam — Part 2 (in Tamil). Manivasagar Publishers, Chennai 108 (Ph:044 25361039). First edition November 2016.
