= Kuladeivam Rajagopal =

Indian actor

- Born: V. R. Rajagopal; 22 April 1931; Kandramanickam, Sivagangai, India
- Died: 30 October 1995 (aged 64)
- Other name: Chinna Kalaivanar
- Occupations: Film Actor, Stage Actor, Singer
- Years active: 1954–1995
- Spouse: Gokilambigai
- Children: 4

V. R. Rajagopal, known professionally as Kuladeivam Rajagopal, was an Indian actor and comedian who worked predominantly in Tamil films and plays. He was popular in the 1950s and 1960s. Rajagopal made his film debut in Kaveri (1955). He acted in more than 200 films in five decades. Rajagopal got a title 'Chinna Kalaivanar' that Madurai fans presented to him in 1961. He was an admirer of 'Kalaivanar' N. S. Krishnan.

== Early career ==
Rajagopal was born in Kandramanickam, a small town in Sivagangai district to Veerasamy Naidu and Deivani Ammal at his father's village Bhagavathar and Building Stackcher. He started acting in Terukkuttu from an early age and joined the Boys Theater Company in trichy at the age of 12. He joined the Kalamani Theater Company in Madurai at the age of 16. On a trip to Salem, Rajagopal met N. S. Krishnan, who became close to him. Rajagopal later joined Krishnan's theatrical company.

== Film career ==
Rajagopal made his film debut in Pudhu Vazhvu which was produced and directed by M. K. Thyagaraja Bhagavathar. As the film was delayed, Rajagopal acted in the Nalla Kaalam movie directed by K.Vembu in 1954. In 1955, Rajagopal acted in Padmini Pictures's Mudhal Thethi and Krishna Pictures's Kaveri. In 1956, Rajagopal acted as one of the four heroes in the film Kula Deivam. Rajagopal was named after the success of the film with the title of Kula Deivam. He left the film industry after starring in films in the late 1970s and early '80s.

== Death ==
Rajagopal died of cardiac arrest on 30 October 1995. His sons Sampath and Selvam worked as a music composing duo.

== Filmography ==
This is a partial filmography. You can expand it.

=== 1950s ===
| Year | Film | Role | Notes |
|---|---|---|---|
| 1954 | Nallakalam | | Uncredited |
| 1955 | Kaveri | | Debut |
| 1955 | Gomathiyin Kaadhalan | Babu | |
| 1956 | Kula Deivam | Chinnaiah | |
| 1956 | Madurai Veeran | | |
| 1956 | Raja Rani | Shankaran | |
| 1956 | Rangoon Radha | Naidu's assistant | |
| 1957 | Pudhu Vazhvu | | Rajagopal's first film. But, the film got delayed. later, released in 1957. |
| 1958 | Annaiyin Aanai | | |
| 1958 | Thirumanam | | |
| 1958 | Sabash Meena | | |
| 1958 | Thedi Vandha Selvam | | |
| 1958 | Naan Valartha Thangai | | |
| 1958 | Sengottai Singam | | |
| 1958 | Engal Kudumbam Perisu | | |
| 1959 | Vaazha Vaitha Deivam | | |
| 1959 | Kalyanikku Kalyanam | | |
| 1959 | Yanai Paagan | Skandan | |
| 1959 | Naalu Veli Nilam | | |
| 1959 | Thanga Padhumai | | |
| 1959 | President Panchaksharam | | |
| 1959 | Raja Malaya Simha | | |
| 1959 | Veerapandiya Kattabomman | Kariyappan | |
| 1959 | Deiva Balam | | |
| 1959 | Thalai Koduthaan Thambi | | |
| 1959 | Vazha Vaitha Deivam | | |
| 1959 | Abalai Anjugam | | |

=== 1960s ===
| Year | Film | Role | Notes |
|---|---|---|---|
| 1960 | Kalathur Kannamma | Rathnam | |
| 1960 | Engal Selvi | | |
| 1960 | Thilakam | | |
| 1960 | Kuravanji | | |
| 1960 | Uthami Petra Rathinam | | |
| 1960 | Raja Makutam | | |
| 1960 | Mannadhi Mannan | Balaraman | |
| 1960 | Engal Selvi | | |
| 1961 | Sabaash Mapillai | | |
| 1961 | Thirudathe | | |
| 1961 | Thaai Sollai Thattadhe | | |
| 1961 | Kappalottiya Thamizhan | | |
| 1961 | Kongunattu Thangam | | |
| 1962 | Ellorum Vazhavendum | | |
| 1962 | Maadappura | | |
| 1962 | Vadivukku Valai Kappu | | |
| 1964 | Karuppu Panam | | |
| 1964 | Karnan | | |
| 1966 | Chitthi | | |
| 1966 | Chandhrodhayam | | |
| 1966 | Thaye Unakkaga | | |
| 1969 | Kaaval Dheivam | | |

=== 1970s ===
| Year | Film | Role | Notes |
|---|---|---|---|
| 1970 | Engirundho Vandhaal | Samiyaar | |
| 1971 | Arunodhayam | Mani | |
| 1972 | Karunthel Kannayiram | | |
| 1972 | Itho Enthan Deivam | | |
| 1972 | Annai Abirami | | |
| 1973 | Deivamsam | | |
| 1973 | Nathayil Muthu | | |
| 1973 | Prarthanai | | |
| 1976 | Gruhapravesam | | |
| 1976 | Payanam | | |
| 1976 | Vayilla Poochi | | |
| 1977 | Avar Enakke Sontham | | |

=== 1980s ===
| Year | Film | Role | Notes |
|---|---|---|---|
| 1980 | Karayai Thodatha Alaigal | | |
| 1981 | Karaiyellam Shenbagapoo | Villu paatu singer | |
| 1984 | Vaai Sollil Veeranadi | | |
| 1984 | Puyal Kadantha Bhoomi | Pattampoochi | |
| 1985 | Nalla Thambi | | |
| 1986 | Thazhuvatha Kaigal | | |
| 1987 | Enga Chinna Rasa | Chinnarasu's Uncle | |
| 1988 | Veedu Manaivi Makkal | Broker Bullet | |
| 1988 | Penmani Aval Kanmani | | |
| 1989 | Aararo Aariraro | | |

=== 1990s ===
| Year | Film | Role | Notes |
|---|---|---|---|
| 1990 | Palaivana Paravaigal | | |
| 1990 | Aarathi Edungadi | | |
| 1991 | Eeramana Rojave | | |
| 1991 | Pavunnu Pavunuthan | | |
| 1992 | Villu Pattukaran | | Last film |
| 1993 | Maamiyar Veedu | Korai Kaluthu Kuppusamy | Posthumously released |
| 1993 | Naan Pesa Ninaipathellam | | Posthumously released |
| 1995 | Paattu Vaathiyar | Headmaster | Posthumously released |
