= Azhagarmalai Kalvan =

1959 film

- Directed by: Kemparaj Urs
- Screenplay by: Puratchidasan
- Produced by: Kemparaj Urs
- Starring: K. Balaji; Malini; V. Nagayya; Vijayakumari
- Cinematography: B. D. Mathoor
- Edited by: Kandasamy
- Music by: B. Gopalam
- Production company: Kemparaj Productions
- Release date: 4 December 1959
- Country: India
- Language: Tamil

Azhagarmalai Kalvan (transl. The Robber from Azhagar Mountain) is a 1959 Indian Tamil language film produced and directed by Kemparaj Urs. The film stars K. Balaji and Malini

== Cast ==
The list is compiled from Film News Anandan's database.

- K. Balaji
- Malini
- V. Nagayya
- C. R. Vijayakumari
- Kamaraj
- Manorama
- V. Gopalakrishnan
- Lakshmiprabha
- Kaka Radhakrishnan

== Soundtrack ==
Music was composed by B. Gopalam. The song "Nilavum Tharaiyum Neeyamma" is the first lyric penned by Vaali for a film.

| Song | Singer/s | Lyricist | Duration (m:ss) |
|---|---|---|---|
| "Nilavum Tharaiyum Neeyamma" | P. Suseela | Vaali | 03:11 |
| "Thaen Thoongum Thenpodhigai Charalile" | Thiruchi Loganathan | Puratchidasan | 03:09 |
| "Kaattu Vazhi Pogaiyile" | Thiruchi Loganathan & Jikki | Puratchidasan | 03:01 |
| "Konjidum Mangai Kumariyaanaal" | P. Suseela | Puratchidasan | 03:28 |
| "Selaadum Vanna Odai" | S. Janaki | Puratchidasan | 03:05 |
| "Mai Ezhudhi Pottumittu" | S. C. Krishnan & K. Rani | Puratchidasan | |
| "Kannale Pesum Nam Kaadhale" | A. L. Raghavan & P. Suseela | Puratchidasan | 03:14 |
| "Padhungi Ninnu Paayum Vengai" | S. C. Krishnan & A. P. Komala | Puratchidasan | |
| "Poonthendrale Vandhiduvaai...Kanindha Kadhal" | P. B. Srinivas & P. Suseela | Puratchidasan | 03:26 |
| "Chithiram Kalainduvida" | Thiruchi Loganathan | Puratchidasan | 02:51 |
| "Thoongaadha Kannil" | Jikki | Puratchidasan | 03:15 |
