= Karuppu Panam =

- Poster
- Directed by: G. R. Nathan
- Screenplay by: Valampuri Somanathan
- Story by: Kannadasan
- Starring: T. S. Balaiah; K. Sarangapani; Balaji; K. R. Vijaya; Sheela
- Cinematography: G. R. Nathan
- Edited by: S. Surya; R. Devarajan
- Music by: Viswanathan–Ramamoorthy
- Production company: Visalakshi Films
- Release date: 3 October 1964
- Running time: 132 minutes
- Country: India
- Language: Tamil

Karuppu Panam (transl. Black Money) is a 1964 Indian Tamil-language crime film directed and photographed by G. R. Nathan. The screenplay was written by Valampuri Somanathan from a story by Kannadasan. The music was by Viswanathan–Ramamoorthy. It stars T. S. Balaiah, K. Sarangapani, Balaji, K. R. Vijaya and Sheela. The film was commercially successful.

== Cast ==
Male cast

- T. S. Balaiah as Sattanathan
- K. Sarangapani as Dhamodharan
- Balaji as Gandhi
- Kuladeivam Rajagopal as Raju
- V. S. Raghavan as Sambasivam
- Shanmugasundaram as Sundaram
- Ramanathan as Devi's brother
- Kannadasan as Thanikachalam

Female cast

- K. R. Vijaya as Devi
- Sheela as Lucy
- C. K. Saraswathi as Shankari
- S. N. Lakshmi as Sattanathan's first wife
- S. Varalakshmi as Kamala

== Production ==
Karuppu Panam was directed and photographed by G. R. Nathan. The screenplay was written by Valampuri Somanathan from a story by Kannadasan. Editing was handled by S. Surya (for whom this was a posthumous release) and R. Devarajan, and art direction was handled by Alagappan. Kannadasan also played the antagonist, and many viewers believed the film parodied actor M. G. Ramachandran's public life, given the tumultuous relationship between him and Kannadasan.

== Soundtrack ==
The music was composed by Viswanathan–Ramamoorthy. Lyrics were written by Kannadasan.

Song	Singers	Length
"Ellarum Ellamum"	Sirkazhi Govindarajan	3:15
"Iraikka Iraikka"	Sirkazhi Govindarajan	1:00
"Kanmani Kanmai Kanne"	P. Susheela	3:22
"Ammamma Keladi"	L. R. Eswari	5:28
"Kayilae Panamirundhal"	L. R. Eswari	3:28
"Aadavarellam Aadavaralam"	L. R. Eswari	3:23
"Pattu Chiragukonda"	A. L. Raghavan L. R. Eswari	3:44
"Thangachi Chinna Ponnu"	Sirkazhi Govindarajan L. R. Eswari	6:24
"Iraiva Iraiva" (Unthan Rajasabai)	S. Janaki	4:21

== Reception ==
The Indian Express wrote, "As a photographer, G. R. Nathan's work is slick but as a director it is slack at many places [...] Kannadasan writes better than he acts".
