= Azhagu Nila =

1962 film

- Poster
- Directed by: S. Raghavan
- Screenplay by: Essar
- Story by: K. Dharmaraj
- Produced by: S. Raghavan
- Starring: Kalyan Kumar; Malini; R. Muthuraman; Vasanthi
- Cinematography: U. Rajagopal
- Edited by: P. Baktha
- Music by: K. V. Mahadevan
- Production company: Ragavan Productions
- Release date: 1962
- Running time: 153 minutes
- Country: India
- Language: Tamil

Azhagu Nila (transl. Beautiful Moon; titled onscreen as Azhaku Nila) is a 1962 Indian Tamil language drama film directed by S. Ragavan and produced by Raagavan Productions.

== Cast ==
Male cast

- Kalyan Kumar
- K. A. Thangavelu
- R. Muthuraman
- V. K. Ramasamy
- T. K. Ramachandran
- K. Sairam
- V. P. S. Mani
- S. S. Maninathan
- Vairam Krishnamoorthy
- Master Dasarathan
- Master Suresh
- V. Nagayya (guest appearance)
- M. K. Mustafa (guest appearance)

Female cast

- Malini
- Vasanthi
- M. S. S. Bhagyam
- Baby Padmini
- Baby Mangalam
- Lakshmikantam

== Production ==
The film was shot on 35-mm stock, resulting in a final length of 14,429 feet distributed across 16 reels.

== Soundtrack ==
The music was composed by K. V. Mahadevan, with lyrics written by A. Maruthakasi. The songs "Manithan Ellaam Therindhu Kondaan" and "Moongil Marakaattinile" became famous. The song "Chinna Chinna Rojaa" is set to the raga Pahadi.

Song	Singers	Length
"Manithan Ellaam Therindhu Kondaan"	Seerkazhi Govindarajan	04:15
"Aattam Aadadho Paattu Paadadho"	A. L. Raghavan, P. Susheela & K. Jamuna Rani	04:14
"Moongil Marakaattinile"	Seerkazhi Govindarajan, P. Susheela	04:35
"Aruvi Karai Oratthile"	P. Susheela	04:51
"Chinna Chinna Rojaa"	P. B. Srinivas	02:45
"Kaattu Kuyilukkum Naattu Kuyilukkum"	Seerkazhi Govindarajan, P. Susheela	02:12

== Bibliography ==
- Rajadhyaksha, Ashish; Willemen, Paul (1998) [1994]. Encyclopaedia of Indian Cinema. British Film Institute and Oxford University Press. ISBN 0-19-563579-5.
