= Sabaash Meena =

1958 film by B. R. Panthulu

- Theatrical release poster
- Directed by: B. R. Panthulu
- Story by: Dada Mirasi
- Produced by: B. R. Panthulu
- Starring: Sivaji Ganesan; B. Saroja Devi; Malini; J. P. Chandrababu
- Cinematography: W. R. Subba Rao; Karnan
- Edited by: R. Devarajan
- Music by: T. G. Lingappa
- Production company: Padmini Pictures
- Distributed by: A. L. S. Productions
- Release date: 3 October 1958
- Running time: 159 minutes
- Country: India
- Language: Tamil

Sabaash Meena (transl. Bravo Meena) is a 1958 Indian Tamil-language comedy film produced and directed by B. R. Panthulu. The film stars Sivaji Ganesan, B. Saroja Devi, Chandrababu and Malini, with Panthulu and S. V. Ranga Rao in supporting roles. It was released on 3 October 1958. The film was remade into Hindi as Dil Tera Deewana (1962), in Kannada as Aliya Geleya (1971), and in Malayalam as Chirikkudukka (1976).

== Plot ==
Mohan is a rich spoilt brat. His erratic and irresponsible behaviour forces his father Sadasivam Pillai to send him to his friend Appadurai's place in Madras to work and learn something in life. Mohan, a street smart man, sends his friend Shekar in his place to Appadurai. Appadurai, who has not seen Mohan before, accepts Shekar as Mohan and gives him a job. Shekar falls in love with Appadurai's daughter and Mohan who meets Meena in a bus falls for her.

Adding to the mix is Mookan, played by Chandrababu again, who gets swapped with Sekhar giving hilarious situation while Sankar, the corrupt manager of Appadurai and the intended groom for Meena, serves as villain to unite Sekhar and Mohan to resolve all issues and take their due place.

What follows is a humorous depiction of their love stories and the confusions it creates.

== Cast ==
Male cast

- Sivaji Ganesan as Mohan
- B. R. Panthulu as Meena's father
- Chandrababu as Shekar
- S. V. Ranga Rao as Appadurai
- V. R. Rajagopal as Mani
- D. Balasubramaniam
- M. R. Santhanam
- Natarajan as Sankar
- Ponnusamy Pillai as Sadhasivam Pillai
- Ganapathy Bhat

Female cast

- B. Saroja Devi as Malathi
- Malini as Meena
- P. S. Gnanam as Paravathi
- Krishnabai
- Chandra as a dancer in "Aanaaga Pirandhathellam"
- Shantha

== Production ==
Chandrababu's pay for the film was one rupee higher than Ganesan's.

== Soundtrack ==
The music was composed by T. G. Lingappa, with lyrics by Ku. Ma. Balasubramaniam. The song "Kaanaa Inbam Kannidhadheno" is set in the Hindustani raga Bageshri.

Song	Singers	Length
"Alangara Valliye"	T. M. Soundararajan & Seerkazhi Govindarajan	02:38
"Aanaaga Pirandhadhellam"	P. Susheela & K. Jamuna Rani	03:31
"Chitthiram Pesuthadi"	T. M. Soundararajan	03:18
"Kaanaa Inbam Kannidhadheno"	P. Susheela & T. A. Mothi	03:39
"Nalla Vaazhu Kaanalaame"	Soolamangalam Rajalakshmi	03:33
"Oh Suyanalam Verimigu Maandhargale"	T. M. Soundararajan	03:19
"Chitthiram Pesuthadi"	Soolamangalam Rajalakshmi	03:18
"Erungammaa Summaa Erungammaa"	J. P. Chandrababu, T. G. Lingappa & P. Susheela	06:24
"Inbatthin Vegamaa Idhayatthin Dhaagamaa"	Soolamangalam Rajalakshmi	03:40
"Selvam Nilaiyallave Maname"	T. M. Soundararajan	02:00

== Release and reception ==
Sabaash Meena was released on 3 October 1958, and was distributed by A. L. S. Productions. It was previously scheduled for 19 September 1958, but got postponed due to delays in the arrival of raw film. The film was a major success, even in non-Tamil speaking regions such as Karnataka. It was dubbed into Telugu as Sabash Pilla, which did not achieve the same success.

== Remakes ==
Sabhash Meena was remade into Hindi as Dil Tera Deewana (1962) with Panthulu again directing. He also directed the Kannada remake Aliya Geleya (1971). The film was also remade in Malayalam as Chirikkudukka (1976). The 1996 Tamil film Ullathai Allitha was an unofficial remake of Sabash Meena.
