= Sabhash Ramudu =

Sabash Ramudu
- Theatrical release poster
- Directed by: C. S. Rao
- Screenplay by: C. S. Rao
- Story by: S. K. Prabhakar
- Based on: Bada Bhai (1957)
- Produced by: Sundarlal Nahata; T. Aswathanarayana
- Starring: N. T. Rama Rao; Devika
- Cinematography: Kamal Ghosh
- Edited by: Shankar; C. Hari Rao
- Music by: Ghantasala
- Production company: Rajshree Productions
- Release date: 4 September 1959
- Running time: 183 minutes
- Country: India
- Language: Telugu

Sabash Ramudu is a 1959 Indian Telugu-language drama film directed by C. S. Rao. It stars N. T. Rama Rao and Devika, with music composed by Ghantasala. The film was produced by Sundarlal Nahata and T. Aswathanarayana under the Rajshree Productions banner. The film is a remake of the Hindi film Bada Bhai (1957). It was dubbed in Tamil language with the title Sabash Ramu.

== Plot ==
The film begins at Hyderabad, where Ramu, a wealthy landlord who lost everything in the floods of Godavari, arrives with his family. He buys a rickshaw for a livelihood and aims to civilize his sibling, Mohan. So, he strives hard, which his benevolent wife Lakshmi always favors. In college, Mohan falls for Police Commissioner Narayana Rao's daughter Rani. Besides, dreadful gangsters under the command of vicious Bhupati create mayhem in the town. Bhupati pretends to be honorable and runs a Night Carnival club with his acolyte, Jayashree. Inspector Kumar, the supercilious son of Narayana Rao, is specially appointed to seize the gang. He goes into the snare of Jayashree & bribes and mingles in their wing.

Parallelly, Cutting Master, a piety thief, befriends Ramu and crushes with plucky Malli. Once, Bhupati gets into Ramu's rickshaw when he discerns their shade and base. So, he becomes a victim of their bullets and fractures his leg. Anyhow, Narayana Rao secures him and admits to the hospital. Hereupon, Bhupathi covetously intrudes and threatens to make Ramu quiet, showing danger to his family, which he does. Due to his health condition, Ramu becomes incompetent, which makes it hard for them to survive. Ergo, Lakshmi works as a maid, and Mohan pulls the rickshaw, quitting his studies. Knowing it, Ramu collapses since he cannot raise the funds for Mohan's examination. Though Cutting Master walks to help, he denies it is disgraceful stolen money.

Consequently, rickshaw races occur in which Ramu hits the big time at life risk and triumphs in graduating Mohan. Kumar rebukes Rani for her love affair because he opposes the destitute. However, Narayana Rao, who provides fair treatment to all, accepts the match and aids Mohan to mold into the Police Inspector. Mohan currently turns tough nut to Bhupati. Hence, he wiles to slay him by Jayashree, which she rejects when a rift arises between them. Jayashree pleads for Kumar's support but cannot completely surrender to Bhupati. One night, for fun, Ramu steps out with the rickshaw Jayashree rides, whom he drops at home. Exploiting it, Bhupathi slaughters her and incriminates Ramu by planting her jewelry at his residence.

The next day, while Mohan & Rani's engagement is in progress, Mohan is compelled to apprehend his brother. To this, Lakshmi slaps him, but Ramu feels proud of his honesty. Following this, Mohan detects the whereabouts of Bhupati's camp by backing Cutting Master & Malli. Simultaneously, Rani chases Kumar under suspicion and lands therein, but Bhupati nabs all of them. Now, Bhupati ruses to knit Rani by threatening Mohan's life. During that quandary, Narayana Rao allows Lakshmi to negotiate with Ramu, who flees from the jail, getting knowledge of the status quo. At last, Ramu ceases Bhupati and shields all when Kumar attempts to skip, but duty-minded Narayana Rao prisons him. Finally, the movie ends happily with the marriage of Mohan & Rani.

== Cast ==
The list was adapted from the film's review article in The Hindu.

Male cast

- N. T. Rama Rao as Ramu
- Relangi as Mareesu
- Ramana Murthy as Mohan
- Kantha Rao as Kumar
- Gummadi as Narayana Rao
- R. Nageswara Rao as Bhupathi
- K. V. S. Sarma as Bhupathi's associate

Female cast

- Devika as Lakshmi
- Malini as Rani
- Girija as Mallika
- M.N. Rajam as Jayasri
- Baby Sasikala as Radha
- Surabhi Kamalabai as servant maid

== Production ==
The story was based on the Hindi film Bada Bhai produced and directed by K. Amarnath and released in 1957. Sundarlal Nahata and T. Aswathanarayana, owners of Rajshri Productions bought the rights to remake the film in Telugu. Alterations were made in the story to appeal to the regional audiences. C. S. Rao directed the film while Sadasivabrahmam wrote the story and Telugu dialogues.

== Soundtrack ==
Music was composed by Ghantasala. The song "Jayammu Nischayammura" is inspired by the song "Kadam Badhaye Ja Nazar" from the 1957 film Bada Bhai, sung by Mohammed Rafi.

Telugu

Lyrics were penned by Kosaraju, Sri Sri and Sadasivabrahmam.

No.	Song	Singer/s	Lyricist	Duration (m:ss)
1	"Jayammu Nischayammura…"	Ghantasala, P. Susheela, Udutha Sarojini & group	Kosaraju	02:24
2	"Aasale Alalaaga"	Ghantasala	Kosaraju	02:47
3	"Kala Kala Virisi Jagaale Pulakinchene…"	Ghantasala & P. Susheela	Sri Sri	03:41
4	"Hello Darling Maataadavaa"	Pithapuram Nageswara Rao & K. Jamuna Rani	Sadasivabrahmam	02:54
5	"Jabilli Velugulo Kalindi Chentha"	K. Rani	Sadasivabrahmam	03:46
6	"Oh Chandamama Itu Choodara"	K. Rani	Sadasivabrahmam	04:53
7	"Oh Deva Mora Vinava"	P. Leela	Sri Sri	02:38
8	"Reyi Minchinoyi Raja"	P. Susheela	Kosaraju	02:58
9	"Vannelu Kurise Chinnadhiraa"	K. Jamuna Rani	Kosaraju	03:34
10	"Jayammu Nischayammura"	Ghantasala	Kosaraju	02:11

Tamil

Ku. Sa. Krishnamoorthi wrote the lyrics.

No.	Song	Singer/s	Lyricist	Duration (m:ss)
1	"Jeyam Nichayamadaa"	Seerkazhi Govindarajan & P. K. Saraswathi	Ku. Sa. Krishnamoorthi	02:24
2			Ku. Sa. Krishnamoorthi	
3	"Kalai Ezhil Veesiye"	A. M. Rajah & P. Susheela	Ku. Sa. Krishnamoorthi	03:11
4	"Hallo Darling Paranthodi Vaa"	S. C. Krishnan & Jikki	Ku. Sa. Krishnamoorthi	02:54
5	"Ezhil Mevum Muhunthanai"	Jikki	Ku. Sa. Krishnamoorthi	03:01
6	"O! Chanthira Bimpam Thanai Paaradaa"	K. Rani	Ku. Sa. Krishnamoorthi	03:14
7	"Devaa Unaip Paniven"	P. Leela	Ku. Sa. Krishnamoorthi	
8	"Aaramudhe Thurai Raajaa"	P. Susheela	Ku. Sa. Krishnamoorthi	03:22
9	""		Ku. Sa. Krishnamoorthi	
10	"Jeyam Nichayamadaa"	T. M. Soundararajan		01:58

== Release ==
Sabash Ramudu was released on 4 September 1959. Its Tamil-dubbed version Sabash Ramu was released on 10 September.
