= Chirikkudukka =

- Directed by: A. B. Raj
- Screenplay by: M. R. Joseph
- Story by: Dada Mirasi
- Based on: Sabaash Meena (Tamil)(1958)
- Produced by: Baby
- Starring: Prem Nazir; Vidhubala; Bahadoor; Jose Prakash; Sudheer
- Cinematography: T. N. Krishnankutty Nair
- Edited by: K. Sankunni
- Music by: Shankar–Ganesh
- Production company: Swapna Films
- Release date: 30 April 1976
- Country: India
- Language: Malayalam

Chirikkudukka is a 1976 Indian Malayalam-language comedy film directed by A. B. Raj and produced by Baby. The film stars Prem Nazir, Vidhubala, Thikkurissy Sukumaran Nair, Bahadoor, Sudheer and Jose Prakash. It is a remake of the 1958 Tamil film Sabaash Meena. The film was released on 30 April 1976.

== Cast ==
- Prem Nazir as Preman
- Vidhubala as Radha
- Bahadoor as Babu
- Thikkurissy Sukumaran Nair as Sadasivan Nair
- Jose Prakash as Kumar
- Sudheer as Chandran Menon
- Sankaradi as Keshavan Nair
- T. R. Omana as Lakshmi
- Rani Chandra as Malathi
- T. S. Muthaiah as Radha's Father
- Pattom Sadan as Naanu
- KPAC Lalitha as Sarasa
- Manavalan Joseph as Kochachan
- Prema as Bhargavi
- Cochin Haneefa as Vasu
- Khadeeja
- Mallika Sukumaran as Appakari Mariya
- T. K. Balachandran
- T. P. Madhavan as Gopalan Nair
- Maniyanpilla Raju (Uncredited)
- C. M. Abraham
- Priyan Pazhanji

== Soundtrack ==
The music was composed by Shankar–Ganesh and the lyrics were written by Yusufali Kechery.

Song	Singers
"Chirikkudukke Thanka"	K. J. Yesudas, Chorus, Pattom Sadan
"Chithrakanyake"	K. J. Yesudas
"Kuliru Koranu"	K. J. Yesudas
"Madhuramadhuramen"	S. Janaki
"Rikshaavaala Oh"	P. Susheela, P. Jayachandran
