= Uthami Petra Rathinam =

- Poster
- Directed by: M. A. Thirumugam
- Written by: Aaroor Dass
- Produced by: E. Radhakrishnan
- Starring: K. Balaji; Malini; P. Kannamba
- Cinematography: C. V. Moorthi
- Edited by: M. A. Thirumugam; M. G. Balu Rao; M. A. Mariyappan
- Music by: T. Chalapathi Rao
- Production company: Amara Productions
- Release date: 1 April 1960
- Running time: 149 minutes
- Country: India
- Language: Tamil

Uthami Petra Rathinam (transl. A Precious Gem) is a 1960 Indian Tamil-language drama film directed by M. A. Thirumugam and written by Aaroor Dass. The film stars K. Balaji, Malini and P. Kannamba, with T. K. Ramachandran, M. N. Rajam, Pandari Bai, S. V. Sahasranamam, Kuladeivam Rajagopal and Manorama in supporting roles. It was released on 1 April 1960, and failed at the box office.

== Plot ==
Thematically, it is about the problems between the rich and the poor and a rich man’s daughter falling in love with a poor boy whose father works for the rich man. Others eye the rich man's property. How these problems are solved forms the rest of the story.

The story concerns the problems between a rich man and the poor and the rich man's daughter falling in love in with the poor boy, whose father works for the rich man. The other eye the property and the women and how these problems are solved.

== Cast ==
- K. Balaji
- Malini
- T. K. Ramachandran
- M. N. Rajam
- S. V. Sahasranamam
- P. Kannamba
- S. V. Subbaiah
- Pandari Bai
- Nagesh
- Kuladeivam Rajagopal
- Manorama
- P. D. Sambandam
- Sandow M. M. A. Chinnappa Thevar

== Production ==
The film was produced by Amara Productions and presented by Sandow M. M. A. Chinnappa Thevar, and directed by his brother M. A. Thirumugam. There was a dance sequence by a Sukumari.

== Soundtrack ==
Music was by T. Chalapathi Rao and lyrics were penned by Thanjai N. Ramaiah Dass, A. Maruthakasi and Subbu Arumugam.

Song	Singer	Lyrics	Length
"Annan Manam Polae"	A. P. Komala	Thanjai N. Ramaiah Dass	03:50
"Lalla Lalla Lallalaa" (Jacket Vaali Billaa)	A. L. Raghavan & S. V. Ponnusamy	Thanjai N. Ramaiah Dass	03:25
"Poovintri Manamethu"	T. M. Soundararajan & P. Leela	A. Maruthakasi	02:50
"Aasaiyaale Maadapura"	T. M. Soundararajan & P. Susheela	A. Maruthakasi	03:34
"Annamma Ennamma Sollure"	S. C. Krishnan & Jikki	Thanjai N. Ramaiah Dass	03:10
"Irukka Konjam Idam"	T. M. Soundararajan	Thanjai N. Ramaiah Dass	04:54
"Thediduthe Vanaminke"	P. B. Srinivas	A. Maruthakasi	03:04
"Thediduthe Vaanaminke" – Female	P. Susheela	A. Maruthakasi	02:38
"Aadalum Paadalum"	S. Janaki	Thanjai N. Ramaiah Dass	

== Release and reception ==
Uthami Petra Rathinam was released on 1 April 1960, delayed from November 1959. According to historian Randor Guy, "In spite of the formidable cast, interesting onscreen narration and pleasing music, the film did not do well mainly because of the complicated and somewhat familiar storyline".
