= Ellorum Vazhavendum =

- Poster
- Directed by: G. Viswanathan
- Screenplay by: Ravindar
- Starring: K. Balaji; Malini
- Cinematography: J. G. Vijayan
- Edited by: G. Viswanathan; V. Narayanan
- Music by: Rajan–Nagendra
- Production company: S. R. S. Pictures
- Release date: 1962
- Country: India
- Language: Tamil

Ellorum Vazhavendum (transl. Everyone should live) is a 1962 Indian Tamil language film directed by G. Viswanathan. The film stars K. Balaji and Malini, with M. R. Radha in a guest appearance. The music was scored by Rajan–Nagendra. The film was produced under the banner of S. R. S. Pictures.

== Cast ==
Male Cast

- M. R. Radha (Guest)
- K. Balaji
- Kuladeivam V. R. Rajagopal
- S. A. Ashokan
- Pulimoottai Ramasami
- V. M. Ezhumalai
- Sayeeram
- S. K. Ramaraj
- R. M. Sethupathi
- K. Kannan
- Nagesh
- A. P. S. Mani

Female Cast

- Malini
- T. K. Rajeswari
- K. V. Shanthi
- Renuka Devi
- Jupitor Rathnam
- Lalitha

Dance

- Egyptian Brunette Laila

== Soundtrack ==
Music was composed by Rajan–Nagendra and the lyrics were written by Villiputhan and Muthukoothan.

Song	Singer/s	Lyricist	Length
"Vichithirame Manithan Charithirame"	C. S. Jayaraman	Villiputhan	
"Van Mugathil...Nalla Thamizh Vilakke"	A. M. Rajah & Jikki	Villiputhan	04:13
"Andhi Saayum Verlai"	Jikki	Villiputhan	03:24
"Aarambame Inikkum"	C. S. Jayaraman & Mohana	Villiputhan	03:01
"Vidiyum Varai Kathirupen"	Seergazhi Govindarajan	Villiputhan	02:36
"Andhi Saayum Verlai" (different version)	Jikki	Villiputhan	
"Ponnu Ponnu Ponnu"	S. Janaki	Muthukoothan	

== Reception ==
The Indian Express said on 30 March 1962, "The film has the usual quota of songs and dances of about the average standard." Kalki called M. R. Radha the "star" of the film, but said Malini and Rajeswari were underused.
