= Madappura =

- Theatrical release poster
- Directed by: S. A. Subbaraman
- Written by: Thilagan Narayanasamy
- Produced by: B. Vallinayagam
- Starring: M. G. Ramachandran; B. Saroja Devi
- Cinematography: V. R. Rathnam
- Edited by: S. Surya
- Music by: K. V. Mahadevan
- Production company: B. V. N. Productions
- Release date: 16 February 1962
- Running time: 134 minutes
- Country: India
- Language: Tamil

Madappura (pronounced [maːɖapːɯɾaː] transl. Balcony Pigeon) is a 1962 Indian Tamil-language film, directed by S. A. Subbaraman. The film stars M. G. Ramachandran and B. Saroja Devi. It was released on 16 February 1962.

== Plot ==
Varadarajan, a lawyer in Madras, is murdered, plunging his family into chaos. Ramu, the elder son takes the blame for the crime to save Murthy, his young half-brother. In his escape, the fugitive can count on the indestructible support of two women, Vasantha and Meena who love him (the first one officially and the second one secretly). He is also helped by Velaiya, who worked at the brother's house before the misfortune. Ramu is chased by the policeman Mogan, persuaded by his guilt and also by criminal Kannan and his band, who want into his colossal fortune, conspiring since the beginning, with Varadarajan, much less honest than we could hope for of a lawyer. Ramu leads an investigation to prove his innocence and produce the real culprit, who is found to be Kannan. Ramu will finally emerge as innocent thanks to the testimony swapping with his girlfriend, Parvathi alias Chandra. She was present when Kannan struck the fatal blow to Varadarajan. Towards the end of its trip, as ultimate test, pricked by a dangerous snake, Ramu owes his safety only to the older brother of his beloved deceased Vasantha, the fairground entertainer Muthaiyandhi. Ramu can find comfort from now on in the arms of the one who became, in this precarious adventure, his deserved wife, Meena.

== Cast ==
- M. G. Ramachandran as Ramu
- B. Saroja Devi as Meena
- T. K. Balachandran as Murthy
- M. R. Radha as Velaiya
- M. N. Nambiar as Kannan
- K. Vasanthi as Vasantha
- Gemini Chandra as Parvathi alias Chandra
- V. R. Rajagopal as Muathaiyandhi
- M. K. Mustapha as Police officer Mogan
- Seethalakshmi as Meena's mother

== Production ==
Sowcar Janaki was originally cast in the film for the role lf Vasantha, but was replaced by Vasanthi during production, at the insistence of M. G. Ramachandran.

== Soundtrack ==
The songs were composed by K. V. Mahadevan, while the background music was scored by Violin Mahadevan. Lyrics were penned by A. Maruthakasi.

Song	Singers	Length
"Sirikka Therindhaal Podhum"	T. M. Soundararajan & Soolamangalam Rajalakshmi	03:59
"Oorukkum Theriyaadhu Yaarukkum Puriyaadhu"	T. M. Soundararajan & Soolamangalam Rajalakshmi	04:16
"Varuvaar Oru Naal"	P. Susheela	03.31
"Vanakkam Vanakkam Aiyaa Ammaa"	P. Susheela	03:06
"Kannai Parikudha, Karuthai Izhukudha"	P. Susheela	03:22
"Kannirandum Thevaiyillai Kaanbadharkku"	Soolamangalam Rajalakshmi	03:07
"Oorukkum Theriyaadhu Yaarukkum Puriyaadhu" (pathos)	Soolamangalam Rajalakshmi	02:03
"Manadhil Konda Aasaigalai"	Soolamangalam Rajalakshmi & P. Susheela	04:21
