= Sabaash Mapillai =

- Theatrical release poster
- Directed by: S. Raghavan
- Story by: Essar
- Produced by: S. Raghavan
- Starring: M. G. Ramachandran; M. R. Radha; Malini
- Cinematography: U. Rajagopal
- Edited by: S. Suriya; R. Purusothaman
- Music by: K. V. Mahadevan
- Production company: Ragavan Productions
- Release date: 14 July 1961
- Running time: 166 minutes
- Country: India
- Language: Tamil

Sabaash Mapillai (transl. Bravo, Bridegroom!) is a 1961 Indian Tamil-language comedy film directed and produced by S. Raghavan. The film stars M. G. Ramachandran, M. R. Radha and Malini. It was released on 14 July 1961. Relative to other Ramachandran films, this one performed poorly at the box office.

== Cast ==
- M. G. Ramachandran
- M. R. Radha
- Malini
- V. R. Rajagopal
- T. K. Ramachandran
- K. Chandrakantha
- P. G. Lakshmirajam
- Wahab Kashmiri
- Vairam Krishnamoorthy
- C. P. Kittan
- V. P. S. Mani
- K. Sairam
- M. Lakshmi Prabha

== Production ==
The film featured Ramachandran in a humour oriented role completely different from the action based roles he was known for. Few portions were shot at Bombay (now Mumbai).

== Soundtrack ==
The music was composed by K. V. Mahadevan. All lyrics were by A. Maruthakasi.

Song	Singers	Length
"Jidu Jidu"	Seerkazhi Govindarajan	03:20
"Maappillai"	Seerkazhi Govindarajan, P. Susheela	03:18
"Manathil"	Seerkazhi Govindarajan, P. Susheela	03:59
"Muthupole"	Seerkazhi Govindarajan, Soolamangalam Rajalakshmi	03:04
"Sirippavar Silaper"	Seerkazhi Govindarajan	03:29
"Vellipanathukkum"	P. B. Sreenivas	03:15
"Yaarukku Yaar Sonthamo"	Seerkazhi Govindarajan, P. Susheela	03:30

== Reception ==
Kanthan of Kalki negatively reviewed the film but appreciated Ramachandran for displaying his skill in a rare comical role.
