= Kandramanickam =

Kandaramanickam
- Village
- Location in Tamil Nadu, India
- Coordinates: 10.0463°N 78.6327°E
- Country: India
- State: Tamil Nadu
- District: Sivaganga district

Languages
  - Official: Tamil
- Time zone: UTC+5:30 (IST)
- PIN: 630204
- Telephone code: 04577
- Vehicle registration: TN-63

Kandramanickam is a village in Sivaganga district, in the state of Tamil Nadu, India.

== Geography ==
Kandramanickam is located at 10.0463°N 78.6327°E. It is 18 kilometers away from Karaikudi and 8 km away from Thirupatthur. This Kandramanickam falls under Sivaganga District, in closer proximity to Madurai.

The village Kandramanickam [10°54'33.48"N 79°30'56.97"E] lies 6 km east of Nachiyar Koil and is midway between Nachiyar koil and Marudancheri.

== Transports ==
Kandramanickam is connected by public transport from both Karaikudi and Thirupatthur. Both these places are well connected by road transport and Karaikudi is connected by rail as well.

== Notable people ==
- Raman Vijayan
