= Thangam Manasu Thangam =

- Poster
- Directed by: R. M. Krishnaswamy
- Story by: K. P. Kottakkara
- Produced by: Friend Ramaswamy
- Starring: Prem Nazir; M. N. Rajam
- Cinematography: P. B. Mani
- Edited by: R. M. Venugopal
- Music by: K. V. Mahadevan
- Production company: Friend Pictures
- Release date: 1960
- Country: India
- Language: Tamil

Thangam Manasu Thangam (transl. Thangam has a heart of gold) is a 1960 Indian Tamil-language film directed by R. M. Krishnaswamy and produced by Friend Ramaswamy. It stars Prem Nazir and M. N. Rajam.

== Cast ==
Adapted from Film News Anandan's database:

- Prem Nazir as Rajan
- M. N. Rajam
- K. A. Thangavelu
- C. R. Vijayakumari
- Friend Ramaswamy
- Kumudhini
- T. K. Ramachandran
- M. Saroja
- N. Narayana Pillai

== Production ==
Thangam Manasu Thangam was directed by R. M. Krishnaswamy, and produced by Friend Ramaswamy under Friend Pictures. The story was written by K. P. Kottakkaara, and the dialogues by A. L. Narayanan. Cinematography was handled by P. B. Mani, and editing by R. M. Venugopal.

== Soundtrack ==
The soundtrack was composed by K. V. Mahadevan, and the lyrics were written by A. Maruthakasi, Thanjai N. Ramaiah Dass and Abdul Ghafoor Sahib.

Song	Singer/s	Lyrics	Duration (m:ss)
"Pongum Azhagu Pootthu"	Seerkazhi Govindarajan & P. Susheela	A. Maruthakasi	03:32
"Arugil Vaarayo En Aaval Theerayo"	K. Jamuna Rani	A. Maruthakasi	02:33
"Sangeetham Paadi"	Seerkazhi Govindarajan & Jikki	A. Maruthakasi	03:16
"Mangala Thulasi Maadhaa Neeye"	P. Susheela	Abdul Ghafoor Sahib	02:49
"Chinnan Chiru Veedu Onnu"	M. S. Rajeswari, K. Jamuna Rani & L. R. Eswari	A. Maruthakasi	02:48
"Sirikkudhu Mullai"	Seerkazhi Govindarajan & P. Susheela	A. Maruthakasi	03:00
"Iruudhaa Amma"	Thiruchi Loganathan & A. L. Raghavan	Thanjai N. Ramaiah Dass	
"Kalaimagal Malaradi"	L. R. Eswari	A. Maruthakasi	
"Kannaa Varuyaayaadaa"	Jikki	Thanjai N. Ramaiah Dass	
"Aasai Mozhi Pesum"	A. L. Raghavan	A. Maruthakasi	

== Reception ==
The reviewer from the magazine Kalki praised Prem Nazir's performance.
