= Ondrupattal Undu Vazhvu =

1960 film by T. R. Ramanna

- Directed by: T. R. Ramanna
- Screenplay by: (Dialogues) Thuraiyur K. Moorthy
- Story by: Vinothkumar
- Produced by: Kanagaraj; Ramakrishnan
- Starring: M. R. Radha; E. V. Saroja; Prem Nazir; R. Muthuraman
- Cinematography: T. K. Rajabathar
- Edited by: M. V. Rajan
- Music by: Viswanathan–Ramamoorthy
- Production company: Ranga Pictures
- Release date: 15 July 1960
- Running time: 165 minutes
- Country: India
- Language: Tamil

Ondrupattal Undu Vazhvu (transl. There is life, if we are united) is a 1960 Indian Tamil-language film directed by T. R. Ramanna. The film stars M. R. Radha, E. V. Saroja, Prem Nazir and R. Muthuraman. It was released on 15 July 1960.

== Plot ==
The moral of the story is that people cannot live without inter-dependence.

== Cast ==
The details are compiled from the database of Film News Anandan and film credits.

- M. R. Radha
- Prem Nazir
- R. Muthuraman
- Kaka Radhakrishnan
- E. V. Saroja
- Malini
- M. Saroja
- P. D. Sambandam
- A. Veerappan
- Sayeeram
- Peer Mohamed
- Kolathu Mani
- Karuppiah
- Natarajan
- Sami

Dance

- Sukumari
- Reddi

== Soundtrack ==
Music was composed by the duo Viswanathan–Ramamoorthy and the lyrics were penned by Pattukkottai Kalyanasundaram.

Song	Singer/s	Length
"Chaayaa Chaayaa Karam Chaayaa"	A. L. Raghavan	02:50
"Ulagathile .. Kalangadhe Kavalaipadadhe"	Sirkazhi Govindarajan, S. C. Krishnan, K. Jamuna Rani, L. R. Eswari and group	04:43
"Endha Naalum Sandhoshame"	K. Jamuna Rani	03:20
"Unmaiyai Sonnavanai Ulagam"	Sirgazhi Govindarajan	
"Enga Vaazhkaiyile Ulla Suvai"	P. Susheela & K. Jamuna Rani	04:58
"Annaachi Vandhaachi Arivu Thelivaachu"	L. R. Eswari	
"Thunindhaal Thunbamillai"	P. Susheela	03:10
"Chala Chala Raagathile"	P. Susheela	03:11
"Ondrupattal Undu Vazhvu"	T. M. Soundararajan & Jikki	03:08
"Ellorum Innaattu Mannare"	T. M. Soundararajan, S. C. Krishnan, Jikki and group	

== Reception ==
A reviewer in The Indian Express was not impressed by the film, writing: "Ondru Pattal Undu Vazhvoo is yet another Tamil production trying to cash in on the current box office trend of sublimating the workers' cause."
