= Malini (actress) =

Indian actress

Malini or Kusuma Kumari was an Indian actress who starred in Tamil language and Telugu language films between 1955 and 1962.

== Career ==
She co-starred with actors of her era, including Rama Rao, Nageswara Rao, Sivaji Ganesan, M. G. Ramachandran, S. S. Rajendran, K. Balaji and Chalam.

Malini was credited by various names during her career. In her earlier Telugu films, she was credited as Kusuma or Kusuma Kumari. She later adopted Malini as the screen name for her 1958 Tamil film Sabaash Meena and later films. She later married S. Raghavan (producer-director of the film Sabaash Mapillai) and quit films.

== Filmography ==
Year	Film	Role	Language	Ref.
1955	Santhanam	Sarala	Telugu	
1957	Sankalpam		Telugu	
1958	Sabaash Meena	Meena	Tamil	
1959	Thalai Koduthaan Thambi	Poogodi	Tamil	
1959	Sabhash Ramudu	Rani	Telugu	
1959	Aval Yaar	Aasha	Tamil	
1959	Uthami Petra Rathinam	Mala	Tamil	
1959	Azhagarmalai Kalvan	Shantha	Tamil	
1960	Ondrupattal Undu Vazhvu		Tamil	
1960	Chivaraku Migiledi	Lakshmi	Telugu	
1961	Bavamaradallu		Telugu	
1961	Sabaash Mapillai	Vasanthi	Tamil	
1962	Ellorum Vazhavendum	Meena	Tamil	
1962	Azhagu Nila		Tamil	
