= Naagamalai Azhagi =

- Directed by: G. Viswanathan
- Written by: Ki. Na. Kadhiroli
- Starring: M. R. Radha; Nagesh; Manorama
- Music by: S. P. Kodandapani; T. A. Mothi
- Production company: Madheswari Films
- Release date: 1962
- Country: India
- Language: Tamil

Naagamalai Azhagi (transl. (The) Beautiful Girl of Nagamalai) is a 1962 Indian Tamil-language film directed by G. Viswanathan. The film stars M. R. Radha and C. Leela. The film contains dance sequences by Sathyavathi and Rajeshwari in Eastmancolor.

== Cast ==
The list is adapted from the book Thiraikalanjiyam Part 2.

Male cast

- M. R. Radha
- Kallapart Natarajan
- Nagesh
- V. S. Raghavan
- S. S. Sivasooriyan
- M. C. Chokkalingam
- Ki. Na. Kadhiroli
- C. L. Anandan Guest

Female cast

- C. Leela
- Gemini Chandra
- Manorama
- Sathiyavathi
- Rajeswari

== Production ==
The film was produced by Madheswari Films and was directed by G. Viswanathan. Story and dialogues were written by Ki. Naa. Kadhiroli.

== Soundtrack ==
Music was composed by S. P. Kodandapani. T. A. Mothi composed music for one song Vandu Vandhu Mella Mella. Lyrics were penned by Elangkavi Muthukoothan, Pulavar Naga. Shanmugam, Chittibabu and Ku. Ma. Krishnan.

Song	Singer/s	Lyricist	Length
"Naagam Kudai Pidikka"	Seerkazhi Govindarajan & group	Elangkavi Muthukoothan	05:19
"Etti Ninnu Enakke Valai Virichaa"	K. Jamuna Rani & group	Elangkavi Muthukoothan	04:01
"Konji Konji Pesalaam"	P. B. Srinivas & L. R. Eswari	Elangkavi Muthukoothan	04:02
"Vandu Vandhu Mella Mella"	A. L. Raghavan & K. Jamuna Rani	Chittibabu	03:31
"Un Idhaya Naadhamum Ennuyir Geethamum"	P. Susheela	Ku. Ma. Krishnan	05:32
"Maamaannu Solli Kooppdidavaa"	S. Janaki & L. R. Eswari	Elangkavi Muthukoothan	03:48
"Kattu Kulaiyaadha Thanga Silai"	K. Jamuna Rani & group	Pulavar Naga. Shanmugam	03:30
