= Ponni Thirunaal =

- Film poster
- Directed by: A. K. Velan
- Screenplay by: A. K. Velan; M. Rajarathinam
- Produced by: A. K. Velan
- Starring: Muthukrishnan; Rajasulochana; L. Vijayalakshmi
- Cinematography: V. Ramamurthi
- Edited by: P. S. Gopalakrishnan
- Music by: K. V. Mahadevan
- Production company: Arunachalam Pictures
- Release date: 9 September 1960
- Country: India
- Language: Tamil

Ponni Thirunaal is a 1960 Indian Tamil-language film produced and directed by A. K. Velan. The film stars Muthukrishnan, Rajasulochana and L. Vijayalakshmi. It was released on 9 September 1960.

== Plot ==
Vimala is the daughter of a rich man, Naganathar. She falls in love with a poor young man, Ponnan. Naganathar strongly opposes her marrying Ponnan. Naganathar employed some thugs and they attacked Ponnan, who then was admitted to a hospital. Vimala, in disguise, visits him in the hospital. Ponnan's father was afraid for his son's safety. So he sends Ponnan to serve in the army. Vimala writes a letter to Ponnan, but the letter falls into the hands of a conspirator. Meanwhile, Naganathar arranges a marriage to Vimala. She escapes and falls into the hands of the conspirator. However, everyone thinks Vimala has drowned in a river. Naganathar, unable to bear the loss of his daughter, donates his money by building schools, etc. Ponnan returns to the village and learns that Vimala is dead. He becomes ill due to sorrow and he convalesces at the house of Vimala's friend, Sarasa. Due to pressure from relatives, Ponnan agrees to marry Sarasa. But, on the day of the marriage, Vimala escapes from the clutches of the conspirator and returns only to see Ponnan and Sarasa ready to marry each other. What happens next forms the rest of the story.

== Cast ==
The cast was compiled from Film News Anandan's database.

- "Valaiyapathi" Muthukrishnan
- Pakkirisami
- Venkadachalam
- V. K. Ramasamy
- Rajasulochana
- L. Vijayalakshmi
- C. K. Saraswathi
- K. R. Ratnam
- Manorama
- Lakshmirajam

== Soundtrack ==
Music was composed by K. V. Mahadevan. One Andal pasuram also was included in the film.

Song	Singer/s	Lyricist	Duration(m:ss)
"Pongi Varum Kaviriye"	Seergazhi Govindarajan, Thiruchi Loganathan, Soolamangalam Rajalakshmi & L. R. Eswari	A. Maruthakasi	05:19
"Pattu Siragadithu"	P. Susheela	A. Maruthakasi	03:50
"Inba Vazhvu Malara"	K. Jamuna Rani	A. Maruthakasi	03:00
"Athaanai Paaru Adi"	K. Jamuna Rani	A. Maruthakasi	03:55
"Karumbu Villai Eduthu"	Seergazhi Govindarajan, Thiruchi Loganathan; A. L. Raghavan, S. V. Ponnusamy & L. R. Eswari	Thanjai N. Ramaiah Dass	05:52
"Naattukor Thandhaiyadi"	(Radha) Jayalakshmi & Soolamangalam Rajalakshmi	Thanjai N. Ramaiah Dass	04:03
"Mathalam Kotta"	Soolamangalam Rajalakshmi	Andal Pasuram	01:33
"Veesu Thendrale Veesu"	P. B. Srinivas & P. Susheela	Puthaneri Subrahmaniam	03:17
"Kannum Kannum Kadhai Pesi"	P. B. Srinivas & P. Susheela	P. K. Muthusami	02:50
"Yaen Sirithai Enai Paarthu"	P. B. Srinivas	P. K. Muthusami	03:20

== Reception ==
The critic from The Indian Express said Rajasulochana "sparkles with her usual vivacity" in the role of an heiress.
