= Naan Valartha Thangai =

- Poster
- Directed by: Ch. Narayanamurthy
- Screenplay by: (Dialogues) Ra. vi.
- Story by: B. A. Padmanabha Rao
- Starring: Prem Nazir; Pandari Bai; S. V. Subbaiah; Mynavathi
- Cinematography: P. Ramasamy
- Edited by: K. Govindasamy
- Music by: Pendyala
- Production company: Saravanabhava Unity Pictures
- Release date: 10 November 1958
- Running time: 189 minutes
- Country: India
- Language: Tamil

Naan Valartha Thangai (transl. The younger sister I raised) is a 1958 Indian Tamil language drama film directed by Ch. Narayanamurthy. The film stars Prem Nazir and Pandari Bai. It was released on 10 November 1958.

== Cast ==
List adapted from the database of Film News Anandan

Male cast

- Prem Nazir
- S. V. Subbaiah
- Nagesh
- V. R. Rajagopal
- T. K. Ramachandran

Female cast

- Pandari Bai
- Mynavathi
- Helen
- Suryakala
- Daisy Irani (as child artiste)

== Production ==
The film was produced under the banner Saravanabhava Unity Pictures and directed by Ch. Narayanamurthy. Story was by P. A. Padmanabha Rao while the dialogues were written by Ra. Vi. Cinematography was handled by P. Ramasamy and editing was done by K. Govindasamy. S. V. S. Rama Rao was in charge of art direction. P. S. Gopalakrishnan, Chopra and Venugopal handled the choreography. Still photography was done by R. N. Nagaraja Rao and K. Vinayagam. The film was shot at Neptune studios and processed in AVM laboratory.

== Soundtrack ==
Music was composed by Pendyala.

Song	Singer/s	Lyricist
"Amma Thulasi, Unmaiyin Arasi"	P. Leela	Pattukkottai Kalyanasundaram
"Aangal Maname Appadithaan"	T. M. Soundararajan & P. Susheela	Pattukkottai Kalyanasundaram
"Katpin Ilakkaname"	Ghantasala	Pattukkottai Kalyanasundaram
"Indhiyaavin Raajathaani Dilli"	A. L. Raghavan & Jikki	Pattukkottai Kalyanasundaram
"Maalai Neram Vandhathu Paaru"	Jikki	Pattukkottai Kalyanasundaram
"Inba Mugam Onru Kanden"	P. Susheela	Pattukkottai Kalyanasundaram
"Paarthaayaa Maanidanin"	P. Susheela	Pattukkottai Kalyanasundaram
"Aisaa Paisaa Ulagamadaa"	P. Susheela	Thanjai N. Ramaiah Dass
"Ottu Maambazhathai Pole"	S. C. Krishnan & Jikki	Thanjai N. Ramaiah Dass

== Release ==
Naan Valartha Thangai was released on 10 November 1958, delayed from a September release.
