= Thalai Koduthaan Thambi =

1959 film by T. R. Sundaram

- Poster
- Directed by: T. R. Sundaram
- Screenplay by: Murasoli Maran
- Starring: S. S. Rajendran; R. S. Manohar; K. R. Ramasamy; Miss Malini
- Cinematography: C. A. S. Mani
- Edited by: L. Balu
- Music by: Viswanathan–Ramamoorthy
- Production company: Modern Theatres
- Release date: 1959
- Running time: 162 minutes
- Country: India
- Language: Tamil

Thalai Koduthaan Thambi (transl. Younger brother gave his head) is 1959 Tamil-language historical action drama film, directed and produced by T. R. Sundaram of Modern Theatres, and written by Murasoli Maran. Music was by Viswanathan–Ramamoorthy. It stars S. S. Rajendran, R. S. Manohar and Malini.

== Plot ==
The film is about a princess, who falls in love with a commoner from another kingdom. The Kings, however object to her marrying a common man. The princess feigns her suicide and elopes with her lover to his kingdom.

Upon reaching it, the princess is shocked when she discovers that the man is already married and has a child too. The husband loses both his arms in an accident and hands over his first born son with his first wife, to a friend. The princess also delivers a son, who grows up with her.

On her death bed, the princess reveals the truth about her husband and about the existence of a stepbrother. The enraged son vows to kill the man who duped his mother. In the course of events, the two brothers end up in the same prison, and when they meet they are unaware of their real identities. What happens to the brothers as they find out about their real identities forms the rest of the film.

== Cast ==
Cast according to the opening credits of the film

Male cast

- S. S. Rajendran as Indrajith
- K. R. Ramasamy as Inbasakaran
- S. Manohar as Vijayan
- T. K. Ramachandran as Naganathan
- V. R. Rajagopal as Manmadhan

Male support cast

- Narayana Pillai, Sethupathi, K. V. Srinivasan,
  Kittan, Thirupathisami, Santhanam
  M. A. Ganapathi and V. P. S. Mani.

Female cast

- Miss Malini as Poongodi
- Tambaram Lalitha as Shanthavalli
- T. P. Muthulakshmi as Radhi
- P. S. Gnanam as Punidhai
- K. V. Shanthi
- Baby Uma as Poongodi's daughter

== Soundtrack ==
Music was by Viswanathan–Ramamoorthy.

Songs	Singers	Lyrics	Length
"Kadhai Kadhaiyam Kaaranamaam"	A. L. Raghavan & Jikki	A. Maruthakasi	03:21
"Thalai Kodutthaan Thambi"	N. L. Ganasaraswathi, S. C. Krishnan & Seerkazhi Govindarajan	A. Maruthakasi	06:12
"Panneeril Thalai Muzhugi"	N. L. Ganasaraswathi, S. C. Krishnan & Seerkazhi Govindarajan	A. Maruthakasi	06:03
"Anaivarum Karuthudan"	N. L. Ganasaraswathi, S. C. Krishnan & Seerkazhi Govindarajan	A. Maruthakasi	06:12
"Bham Bham...Kaalaiyil Raajaa Aanaaraam"	K. Jamuna Rani & S. C. Krishnan	A. Maruthakasi	03:30
"Ondru Seraa Iru Dhuruvam"	T. M. Soundararajan	A. Maruthakasi	03:18
"Thaen Venduma Illai Naan Venduma"	Jikki	Pattukkottai Kalyanasundaram	03:23
"Thulli Thulli Alaigal Ellaam"	A. M. Rajah & P. Suseela	Pattukkottai Kalyanasundaram	03:37
"Vaada Vetthalai Vadhanga Vetthalai"	A. L. Raghavan & K. Jamuna Rani	Suratha	02:49
"Vachchirukken Naan"	K. Jamuna Rani	Suratha	3:00
