= Irumanam Kalanthal Thirumanam =

- Directed by: Jambanna; G. Viswanath
- Screenplay by: Jambanna; G. Viswanath
- Produced by: Nallam Anand Kanchana
- Starring: Prem Nazir; Ragini; M. N. Rajam; P. S. Veerappa
- Cinematography: Sundar Babu
- Music by: S. Dakshinamurthi
- Production company: V. S. P. Pictures
- Release date: 25 November 1960
- Running time: 02:39:54 (14391 ft.)
- Country: India
- Language: Tamil

Irumanam Kalanthal Thirumanam (transl. Marriage would happen if two hearts unite) is a 1960 Indian Tamil language film directed by Jambanna and G. Viswanath. The film stars Prem Nazir and Ragini.

== Cast ==
This list is adapted from Thiraikalanjiyam.

Male cast

- Prem Nazir
- P. S. Veerappa
- C. S. Pandian

Female cast

- Ragini
- M. N. Rajam
- Sukumari

== Production ==
The film was produced by Nallam Anand Kanchana under the banner V. S. P. Pictures and was directed by Jambanna and G. Viswanath. The directors wrote the screenplay also. A. L. Narayanan wrote the dialogues. Cinematography was done by Sundar Babu.

== Soundtrack ==
The music was composed by S. Dakshinamurthi.

Song	Singer/s	Lyricist	Duration (m:ss)
"Thillalangadi Thillalangadi"	Seshu Kanchana, A. L. Narayanan & C. S. Pandian	A. L. Narayanan	
"Thaam Thaam Thirinam Thirinam Naadhari"	Jikki	A. L. Narayanan, S. Dakshinamurthi, Ganapriya and Baskaran	
"Aavani Maatham Vandhaa Thaavani Maarum"	Kamala & group	A. Maruthakasi	
"Malarnthidum Inbam Manam Poley"	A. L. Raghavan & K. Jamuna Rani	A. Maruthakasi	03:33
"Idhu Niyaayamaa"	A. L. Raghavan & K. Jamuna Rani	A. Maruthakasi	
"Idhu Niyaayamaa" Pathos	K. Jamuna Rani	A. Maruthakasi	
"Kalappai Pidikkum Kaiyai Nambi"	Sirkazhi Govindarajan	A. Maruthakasi	
"Erzhaikal Vazhvai Maaligai Meley"	Jikki & group	A. Maruthakasi	
"Pattu Seylai Vaangi Thaaren"	S. C. Krishnan & A. G. Rathnamala	A. Maruthakasi	
"Kanne Vaadaa Kaniye Vaadaa"	R. Balasaraswathi Devi	A. Maruthakasi	
