= T. K. Ramachandran =

Indian actor and producer

T. K. Ramachandran (died October 1993), was an Indian actor and film producer, who worked in Tamil cinema. He was a popular villain and character actor in many movies in the 1950s and also acted as hero in initial years. In 1966 he produced the movie "Periya Manithan" under the banner Saraswathi Productions starring Kannada actress Uday Chandrika in lead with him in supporting role, directed by K. C. Krishna Moorthy. He acted in some 1970s movies including the 1978 Rajinikanth starer Bairavi and acted until 1982.

== Notable films ==
=== Actor ===
- Naam Iruvar (1947) with V. K. Ramasamy
- Digambara Samiyar - 1950
- Mohana Sundaram - 1951
- Singari – 1951
- Chinnadurai – 1952
- Parasakthi – 1952
- Mappillai – 1952
- Ponamachan Thirumbivandhan – 1954
- Kathanayaki – 1955
- Town Bus – 1955
- Madurai Veeran – 1956
- Marmaveeran – 1956
- Mudhalali – 1957
- Piyamilan – 1958
- Neelavukku Neranja Manasu – 1958
- Aval Yar – 1959
- Uthama Pethra Rathinam – 1959
- Raja Desingu – 1960
- Chavukkadi Chandrakantha – 1960
- ninaipatharku neramillai – 1963
- Sabaash Mapillai – 1961
- Azhagu Nila – 1962
- Periya Manithan – 1966
- Eduppar Kai Pillai – 1975
- Bairavi - 1978
- Anru Muthal Inru Varai – 1981
- Vetri Namathe – 1982
- Vanjikottai Vaaliban - 1958
- Mangalya Manickam
- Manithan Maravillai - 1962
- Thayiku Pin Thamayan – 1955
- Menaka - 1955
- En Magan - 1974 as Jambu

=== Producer ===
- Periya Manithan - 1966
