= T. R. Mahalingam (actor) =

Indian actor and playback singer

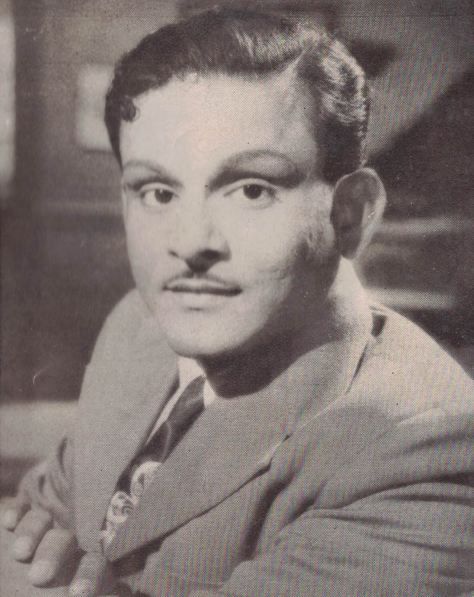
- T. R. Mahalingam in 1950s
- Born: 16 June 1924; Thenkarai, Sholavandan, Madurai, India
- Died: 21 April 1978 (aged 53)
- Known for: Actor; Playback singer

Thenkarai Ramakrishna Mahalingam (16 June 1924 – 21 April 1978) born in Sholavandan Thenkarai was an Indian singer cum actor of the 1940s and 1950s. He was known for his melodious Tamil songs mostly based on romantic or devotional themes.

== Early days ==
Mahalingam's career as a singer cum actor began during his childhood. He regularly appeared in stage plays popularly called special dramas. Mahalingam trained as a singer in an era when microphones and amplifiers were rarely present in performance halls. His music training, like those of singers S. G. Kittappa, Krishnan, M. K. Thyagaraja Bhagavathar and to a large extent TMS, stressed voice projection and singing loud so as to be audible in large auditoriums. So it was that in 1933, when the prominent singer Kittappa died at the early age of 28, Mahalingam got his first break in films.

== Acting ==
In 1937, at the age of 14, Mahalingam got the chance to appear in the film Nandakumar, the third film produced by AVM. The film was based on the story of Lord Krishna wherein Mahalingam was chosen to play the lead role. The film failed at the box office in all the three languages (Tamil, Hindi and Marathi) in which it was made. Nevertheless, it received great accolades for its songs.

Mahalingam got his big break in the film Sri Valli made at the height of the Second World War, in which he played the part of Lord Murugan. The film did well at the box-office and established Mahalingam's reputation as both an actor and a singer.

=== Music composers he sang for ===
Many music directors gave him memorable songs, including S. V. Venkatraman, K. V. Mahadevan, Viswanathan–Ramamoorthy, G. Ramanathan, Sharma Brothers, T. A. Kalyanam, C. N. Pandurangan, Lalitha Venkatraman, T. Rajagopala Sarma, C. R. Subbaraman, T. G. Lingappa, S. Rajeswara Rao, R. Sudarsanam, and Kunnakkudi Vaidyanathan.

=== Playback singers he sang with ===
While Mahalingam had many solo hit songs, he also sang with other singers.

He sang the most number of duets with S. Varalakshmi.

He also sang duets with other female singers: P. A. Periyanayaki, T. R. Rajakumari, P. Bhanumathi, T. V. Rathnam, A. P. Komala, Soolamangalam Jayalakshmi, Soolamangalam Rajalakshmi, T. S. Bagavathi, S. Janaki, P. Leela and P. Susheela.

He was also paired to sing with male singers such as Sirkazhi Govindarajan and S. C. Krishnan.

== Filmography ==
Year	Film	Language	Banner
1938	Nandhakumar	Tamil	AVM Productions
1939	Prahaladha	Tamil	Salem Sankar Films
1940	Bhooloka Rambai	Tamil	Salem Shanmugha Films & Vijaya Maruthi Pictures
1940	Parasuramar	Tamil	Angel Films
1941	Sathi Murali	Tamil	Central Studios
1942	Sathi Sukanya	Tamil	Sri Meenakshi Film Company
1942	Maya Jothi	Tamil	Modern Theatres
1942	Manonmani	Tamil	Modern Theatres
1943	Dhaasippen or Jothi Malar	Tamil	Bhuvaneshwari Pictures
1944	Baktha Hanuman	Tamil	Raman Pictures
1945	Sri Valli	Tamil	Pragathi Studios
1947	Naam Iruvar	Tamil	AVM Productions
1948	Gnana Soundari	Tamil	Newton Studio
1948	Vedhala Ulagam	Tamil	AVM Productions
1948	Adhithan Kanavu	Tamil	Modern Theatres
1949	Pavalakodi	Tamil	Pakshiraja Studios
1949	Mayavathi	Tamil	Ganapathy Pictures
1949	Inbavalli	Tamil	Shyamala Pictures
1950	Laila Majnu	Tamil	Balaji Pictures
1950	Ithaya Geetham	Tamil	Citadel Film Corporation
1950	Macha Rekai	Tamil	Sukumar Productions
1950	Parijatham	Tamil	Sukumar Productions
1951	Mohana Sundaram	Tamil	Sukumar Productions
1952	Velaikaran	Tamil	Sri Valli Productions
1952	Chinna Durai	Tamil	Sukumar Productions
1954	Vilayattu Bommai	Tamil	Sukumar Productions
1958	Maalaiyitta Mangai	Tamil	Kannadasan Films
1959	Manimekalai	Tamil	Sekhar Art Film Enterprises
1959	Abalai Anjugam	Tamil	Aruna Films
1959	Amudhavalli	Tamil	Jupiter Pictures
1960	Thanthaikku Pin Thamaiyan	Tamil	Surya Films
1960	Aada Vandha Deivam	Tamil	Majestic Studios
1960	Rathinapuri Ilavarasi	Tamil	Sri Vinayaka Pictures
1960	Kavalai Illaadha Manithan	Tamil	Kannadasan Productions
1961	Ennai Paar	Tamil	Pazhaniappa Productions
1961	Sri Valli	Tamil	Narasu Studio
1963	Pannaiyar Magan (Unreleased)	Tamil	RA Pictures
1965	Thiruvilaiyadal	Tamil	Sri Vijayalakshmi Pictures
1971	Ilangeswaran	Tamil	Shashti Pictures
1971	Kannan Karunai	Tamil	NAD
1972	Agathiyar	Tamil	Sri Vijayalakshmi Pictures
1972	Thiruneelakandar	Tamil	Sudarkodi Films
1973	Rajaraja Cholan	Tamil	Anand Movies
1973	Thirumalai Deivam	Tamil	Shanthi Combines
1977	Sri Krishna Leela	Tamil	Sree Umaiyambikai Pictures

== Discoraphy ==
Year	Film	Language	Song	Music	Co-Singer
1938	Nandhakumar	Tamil		S. V. Venkatraman	
1939	Prahaladha	Tamil		Sharma Brothers	
1940	Bhooloka Rambai	Tamil		G. Ramanathan	
1940	Parasuramar	Tamil		G. Ramanathan	
1940	Sathi Murali	Tamil			
1941	Dayalan	Tamil	Enake Jayam Kidaithathuve		
1941	Dayalan	Tamil	Parimala Mihuvana		N. V. Krishnan
1942	Manonmani	Tamil		T. A. Kalyanam & K. V. Mahadevan	
1943	Dhaasippen or Jothi Malar	Tamil		Lalitha Venkatraman & S. Rajeswara Rao	
1945	Sri Valli	Tamil	Kaayadha Kaanagatthe.... Mevaadha Maan	T. Rajagopala Sarma & R. Sudarsanam	
1945	Sri Valli	Tamil	Premayaladhey	T. Rajagopala Sarma & R. Sudarsanam	P. A. Periyanayaki
1945	Sri Valli	Tamil	Na Dhi Dha Dhim	T. Rajagopala Sarma & R. Sudarsanam	
1945	Sri Valli	Tamil	Singaara Rooba Aalngaari	T. Rajagopala Sarma & R. Sudarsanam	P. A. Periyanayaki
1947	Nam Iruvar	Tamil	Iga Vaazhvinile Aanandham	R. Sudarsanam	T. S. Bagavathi
1947	Nam Iruvar	Tamil	Solai Malaroliyo	R. Sudarsanam	T. S. Bagavathi
1947	Nam Iruvar	Tamil	Jega Meedhile Mei Kaadhalthaane	R. Sudarsanam	T. S. Bagavathi
1947	Nam Iruvar	Tamil	Devaamudha Mozhiyaale	R. Sudarsanam	
1947	Nam Iruvar	Tamil	Viduthalai Viduthalai Viduthalai	R. Sudarsanam	
1947	Nam Iruvar	Tamil	Kodaiyile Ilaipaatrikolla	R. Sudarsanam	
1948	Gnana Soundari	Tamil	Kaadhalitthaalum Inbam Melaam	S. V. Venkatraman	P. A. Periyanayaki
1948	Gnana Soundari	Tamil	Mana Mohanane	S. V. Venkatraman	P. A. Periyanayaki
1948	Gnana Soundari	Tamil	Mannile Kadalil	S. V. Venkatraman	
1948	Gnana Soundari	Tamil	Arunothayaanandhame	S. V. Venkatraman	
1948	Gnana Soundari	Tamil	Vanithamaniye Mounameno	S. V. Venkatraman	
1948	Gnana Soundari	Tamil	Jegamel Naan Ini Bhagyavaane	S. V. Venkatraman	
1948	Gnana Soundari	Tamil	Vaazhvinil En Uyir Vadivaana	S. V. Venkatraman	
1948	Vedhala Ulagam	Tamil	Senthamizh Naadennum Podhinile	R. Sudarsanam	
1948	Vedhala Ulagam	Tamil	Kalviyil Sirandha Thamizh Nadu	R. Sudarsanam	
1948	Vedhala Ulagam	Tamil	Mahaasugitha Rooba Sundhari	R. Sudarsanam	
1948	Vedhala Ulagam	Tamil	Aadhi Paraasakthi	R. Sudarsanam	
1948	Vedhala Ulagam	Tamil	Satthiyam Seidhu Tharuven	R. Sudarsanam	
1948	Vedhala Ulagam	Tamil	Un Manam Kalangaadho	R. Sudarsanam	
1948	Vedhala Ulagam	Tamil	Dhayai Purivai	R. Sudarsanam	
1948	Vedhala Ulagam	Tamil	Sendhazhavum Vennilave	R. Sudarsanam	T. S. Bagavathi
1948	Adhithan Kanavu	Tamil	Madhuramaana Rusiyullathe	G. Ramanathan	Soolamangalam Jayalakshmi
1949	Pavalakkodi	Tamil	Annam Vaangalaiyo	C. R. Subburaman	
1949	Pavalakkodi	Tamil	Arjuna Mahaaraajan	C. R. Subburaman	
1949	Mayavathi	Tamil	Pennenum Maaya Peyaam Poi Maadharai	G. Ramanathan	
1949	Mayavathi	Tamil	Maane En Prema Raani	G. Ramanathan	M. L. Vasanthakumari
1949	Mayavathi	Tamil	Manamohiniye Unnai Maravene	G. Ramanathan	
1949	Mayavathi	Tamil	Sadhaa Un Haasyamevum	G. Ramanathan	
1949	Inbavalli	Tamil	Inbamana Mohini Maane	G. Ramanathan	P. Leela
1949	Inbavalli	Tamil	Natha En Aasai	G. Ramanathan	T. V. Rathnam
1949	Inbavalli	Tamil	Anbe Perum Nidhiye	G. Ramanathan	P. A. Periyanayaki
1949	Inbavalli	Tamil	Eno Innum Vara	G. Ramanathan	
1950	Laila Majnu	Tamil	Varuvaaro Maangkuyile Sol	S. V. Venkatraman	T. S. Bagavathi
1950	Laila Majnu	Tamil	Sanjalak Kadalile.... Yaar Poi Solluvar	S. V. Venkatraman	
1950	Laila Majnu	Tamil	Paaril Anaathi Naanallave	S. V. Venkatraman	
1950	Laila Majnu	Tamil	Ezhil Vaanil Vilaiyaaduvome	S. V. Venkatraman	
1950	Laila Majnu	Tamil	Parandhu Selludhe En Paingkili	S. V. Venkatraman	
1950	Laila Majnu	Tamil	Anudhinam Sandoshamakave	S. V. Venkatraman	T. S. Bagavathi
1950	Laila Majnu	Tamil	Paingiliye Mano Raagini	S. V. Venkatraman	T. S. Bagavathi
1950	Laila Majnu	Tamil	Vanna Maane Un Ninaivaale	S. V. Venkatraman	
1950	Laila Majnu	Tamil	Maadharase Mayile	S. V. Venkatraman	
1950	Laila Majnu	Tamil	Paavi Ennai Poloruvar	S. V. Venkatraman	T. S. Bagavathi
1950	Parijatham	Tamil	Vaan Nilave	S. V. Venkatraman & C. R. Subburaman	T. V. Rathnam
1950	Parijatham	Tamil	Porumaiyae Inbam Tharum	S. V. Venkatraman & C. R. Subburaman	
1950	Ithaya Geetham	Tamil	Vaanulaavum Thaarai Nee	S. V. Venkatraman	T. R. Rajakumari
1950	Ithaya Geetham	Tamil	Odi Vaa Venmugil Pole	S. V. Venkatraman	T. R. Rajakumari
1950	Ithaya Geetham	Tamil	Aaasai Kiliyai Azhaithu Vaaraai Thendrale	S. V. Venkatraman	
1950	Ithaya Geetham	Tamil	Jeyame Ini Mele Bayamillai Ini	S. V. Venkatraman	K. Sarangapani
1950	Macha Rekai	Tamil	Kalai Maanaip Pola	C. R. Subburaman	
1950	Macha Rekai	Tamil	Ellam Irunthenna... Aaadharavilaa	C. R. Subburaman	S. Varalakshmi
1950	Macha Rekai	Tamil	Devi Jaganmaathaa	C. R. Subburaman	
1950	Macha Rekai	Tamil	Antho Puvimel Adimaiyaaga	C. R. Subburaman	
1950	Macha Rekai	Tamil	Vin Mel Thavazhnthu Sellum	C. R. Subburaman	
1950	Macha Rekai	Tamil	Odathe Unnai Vida Matten	C. R. Subburaman	S. Varalakshmi
1950	Macha Rekai	Tamil	Kanavilum Maravene Naan	C. R. Subburaman	S. Varalakshmi
1950	Macha Rekai	Tamil	Androru Naal Unthan	C. R. Subburaman	
1950	Sukumar	Tamil			
1951	Mohana Sundaram	Tamil	O Jagamadhil Inbam	T. G. Lingappa	S. Varalakshmi
1951	Mohana Sundaram	Tamil	Pulli Maanaippola	T. G. Lingappa	S. Varalakshmi
1951	Mohana Sundaram	Tamil	Kanneer Thaano	T. G. Lingappa	S. Varalakshmi
1951	Mohana Sundaram	Tamil	Kanavilum Unnai Maraven	T. G. Lingappa	
1951	Mohana Sundaram	Tamil	Paattu Venuma Oru Paattu	T. G. Lingappa	
1951	Mohana Sundaram	Tamil	Ninaivellam Neeya	T. G. Lingappa	
1952	Chinna Durai	Tamil	Nilave Neethan Oru	T. G. Lingappa	
1952	Chinna Durai	Tamil	Thiraiye Nee Thoodhu Chellayao	T. G. Lingappa	
1952	Chinna Durai	Tamil	Jegam Yaavum Kaadhal Mayame	T. G. Lingappa	A. G. Rathnamala
1952	Theruppaadagan	Tamil	Adivarum Thendralile Nandhalaalaa	G. Ramanathan	
1952	Theruppaadagan	Tamil	Oindhadhu Ullamadhe.... Neeyum Naanum Kaidhi	G. Ramanathan	
1952	Theruppaadagan	Tamil	Ulagathu Naayagiye Engal Muthu Maaariyamma	G. Ramanathan	
1952	Velaikaran	Tamil	Enadhullam Neeyarindhe	R. Sudarsanam	
1952	Velaikaran	Tamil	Kaadhalum Poi Aagume	R. Sudarsanam	S. Varalakshmi
1954	Vilayattu Bommai	Tamil	Mohathai Konruvidu	T. G. Lingappa	
1954	Vilayattu Bommai	Tamil	Theertha Karaiyinile	T. G. Lingappa	
1954	Vilayattu Bommai	Tamil	Inba Vaanil Ulaavum	T. G. Lingappa	Soolamangalam Rajalakshmi
1954	Vilayattu Bommai	Tamil	Mullaimalar Kodiyin Nizhalile	T. G. Lingappa	
1954	Vilayattu Bommai	Tamil	Vidhikku Manidhane	T. G. Lingappa	
1958	Maalaiyitta Mangai	Tamil	Vengiyum Kumari.... Engal Draavida Ponnaadu	Viswanathan–Ramamoorthy	
1958	Maalaiyitta Mangai	Tamil	Sillendru Pootha.... Senthamizh Thenmozhiyaal	Viswanathan–Ramamoorthy	
1958	Maalaiyitta Mangai	Tamil	Naanandri Yaar Varuvaar	Viswanathan–Ramamoorthy	A. P. Komala
1958	Maalaiyitta Mangai	Tamil	Thingal Mudi Soodum	Viswanathan–Ramamoorthy	
1959	Manimekalai	Tamil	Kanngalin Vennilave	G. Ramanathan	P. Bhanumathi
1959	Manimekalai	Tamil	Aandavan Thamizhanada	G. Ramanathan	
1959	Manimekalai	Tamil	Unnai Kaana Engum	G. Ramanathan	
1959	Manimekalai	Tamil	Aanndavan Padaippinile Naan Kannda	G. Ramanathan	
1959	Abalai Anjugam	Tamil	Ilaiya Kanniyin Azhagiya Vadhanam	K. V. Mahadevan	S. Janaki
1959	Abalai Anjugam	Tamil	Vennile Kudai Pidikka	K. V. Mahadevan	P. Susheela
1959	Abalai Anjugam	Tamil	Pirapokkum Ellaa Uyirkum	K. V. Mahadevan	
1959	Abalai Anjugam	Tamil	Ikkaraikku Akkarai Pachai	K. V. Mahadevan	
1959	Abalai Anjugam	Tamil	Thoondil Poattu Izhutha	K. V. Mahadevan	
1959	Abalai Anjugam	Tamil	Pazhikaara Ulagamadaa Idhu	K. V. Mahadevan	
1959	Abalai Anjugam	Tamil	Nal Vazhiye Nadandhu	K. V. Mahadevan	
1959	Amudhavalli	Tamil	Aadai Katti Vandha Nilavo	Viswanathan–Ramamoorthy	P. Susheela
1959	Amudhavalli	Tamil	Kannirandum Ondrai Ondru	Viswanathan–Ramamoorthy	
1959	Amudhavalli	Tamil	Aadalama Nalam Aadalama	Viswanathan–Ramamoorthy	P. Leela
1959	Amudhavalli	Tamil	Pitham Theliya Marundhondru	Viswanathan–Ramamoorthy	
1959	Amudhavalli	Tamil	Paasaththaal Enai Eendra	Viswanathan–Ramamoorthy	
1959	Amudhavalli	Tamil	Iyal Isai Naadaga Kalaiyaale	Viswanathan–Ramamoorthy	S. C. Krishnan
1959	Amudhavalli	Tamil	Kaalam Enum Oru Aazha Kadalinil	Viswanathan–Ramamoorthy	P. Susheela
1960	Aadavantha Deivam	Tamil	Aasai Kondaen Amudhamae	K. V. Mahadevan	
1960	Aadavantha Deivam	Tamil	Kodi Kodi Inbam Peravae	K. V. Mahadevan	
1960	Aadavantha Deivam	Tamil	Sangam Muzhangivarum Singaara	K. V. Mahadevan	P. Susheela
1960	Aadavantha Deivam	Tamil	Sottu Sottunu Sottudhu Paaru	K. V. Mahadevan	P. Susheela
1960	Aadavantha Deivam	Tamil	Kodi Kodi Inbam Peravae	K. V. Mahadevan	P. Susheela
1960	Kavalai Illaadha Manithan	Tamil	Naan Deivama Illai Nee Deivama	Viswanathan–Ramamoorthy	
1960	Rathinapuri Ilavarasi	Tamil	Padikka Padikka Nenjil Inikkum	Viswanathan–Ramamoorthy	S. Janaki
1960	Rathinapuri Ilavarasi	Tamil	Kaadhalukku Naanku Kanngal	Viswanathan–Ramamoorthy	
1960	Rathinapuri Ilavarasi	Tamil	En Endru Ketkave Aalillai	Viswanathan–Ramamoorthy	
1960	Thanthaikku Pin Thamaiyan	Tamil	Inbam Malarum Anbile	K. V. Mahadevan	
1960	Thanthaikku Pin Thamaiyan	Tamil	Kaaviriyin Neeraadi Kalai Valarkkum	K. V. Mahadevan	
1960	Thanthaikku Pin Thamaiyan	Tamil	Yeru Pondra Thamizh Magane	K. V. Mahadevan	
1960	Thanthaikku Pin Thamaiyan	Tamil	Otrumaiyaal Vetriyelaam	K. V. Mahadevan	
1960	Thanthaikku Pin Thamaiyan	Tamil	Kulungi Vizhum Maaligaiyil	K. V. Mahadevan	
1961	Ennai Paar	Tamil	Kaatchiyum Neethan Karpaniyum Neethan	T. G. Lingappa	S. Janaki
1961	Ennai Paar	Tamil	Edhirkondu Varaverkkudhe	T. G. Lingappa	S. Janaki
1961	Ennai Paar	Tamil	Dhasaradha Raaja Kumaaraa Alangaaraa	T. G. Lingappa	
1961	Sri Valli	Tamil	Karpaga Cholaiyile	G. Ramanathan	
1961	Sri Valli	Tamil	Thandhaikku Annaalil Mandhiratthai	G. Ramanathan	
1961	Sri Valli	Tamil	Mogana Punnagaiyil Enakkoru Mogam	G. Ramanathan	
1961	Sri Valli	Tamil	Gnana Pazhame Mei Gnana Pazhame	G. Ramanathan	
1961	Sri Valli	Tamil	Unakkagave Pirandha Azhagan	G. Ramanathan	
1963	Pannaiyar Magan (Unreleased)	Tamil	Kalaivaani Kalyaani Unmeni	G. Ramanathan	P. Susheela
1963	Pannaiyar Magan (Unreleased)	Tamil	Tamil Naattu Palagaaram	G. Ramanathan	
1965	Thiruvilayadal	Tamil	Illaadhathondrillai Eellaamum Nee	K. V. Mahadevan	
1965	Thiruvilayadal	Tamil	Isai Thamizh Nee Seidha	K. V. Mahadevan	
1971	Agathiyar	Tamil	Aandavan Dharisaname Mei Adiyar	Kunnakkudi Vaidyanathan	
1971	Agathiyar	Tamil	Isaiyai Thamizhai Iruppavane	Kunnakkudi Vaidyanathan	Seerkazhi Govindarajan
1971	Agathiyar	Tamil	Malainindra Thirukumaraa	Kunnakkudi Vaidyanathan	
1971	Agathiyar	Tamil	Muzhu Mudhar Porule	Kunnakkudi Vaidyanathan	
1971	Agathiyar	Tamil	Namachivaya Ena	Kunnakkudi Vaidyanathan	Seerkazhi Govindarajan
1971	Ilangeswaran	Tamil	Dhasaradha Raajakumaaraa	S. M. Subbaiah Naidu	
1971	Kannan Karunai	Tamil	Eno Unakkindha Maayajaalam	S. V. Venkatraman	P. Susheela
1971	Kannan Karunai	Tamil	Inbavalli Vaazh Vidharba Naattai	S. V. Venkatraman	T. M. Soundararajan
1971	Kannan Karunai	Tamil	Thaamarai Idhazh Kannan	S. V. Venkatraman	P. Susheela
1972	Thiruneelakandar	Tamil	Nattiya Kalai	C. N. Pandurangan	
1972	Thiruneelakandar	Tamil	Ambalavaananai Nambiya	C. N. Pandurangan	
1972	Thiruneelakandar	Tamil	Kadalil Vizhuntha Or Kakkai	C. N. Pandurangan	
1972	Thiruneelakandar	Tamil	Thaayae Thandhaiyae	C. N. Pandurangan	
1972	Thiruneelakandar	Tamil	Etthanai Per Unnakku	C. N. Pandurangan	
1972	Thiruneelakandar	Tamil	Sivaleelai En Veettila	C. N. Pandurangan	
1972	Thiruneelakandar	Tamil	Aandavan Thaan Vanthu	C. N. Pandurangan	
1972	Thiruneelakandar	Tamil	Pantha Pasa Kattukulle	C. N. Pandurangan	S. Janaki
1973	Rajaraja Cholan	Tamil	Thanjai Periya Koyil	Kunnakkudi Vaidyanathan	Seerkazhi Govindarajan & S. Varalakshmi
1973	Rajaraja Cholan	Tamil	Thendralodu Udanpiranthaal	Kunnakkudi Vaidyanathan	Sivaji Ganesan (dialogues)
1973	Thirumalai Deivam	Tamil	Thiruvarul Tharum Dheivam	Kunnakkudi Vaidyanathan	
1977	Sri Krishna Leela	Tamil	Naaranane Unadhu	S. V. Venkatraman	
