= Maalaiyitta Mangai =

1958 film

- Theatrical release poster
- Directed by: G. R. Nathan
- Screenplay by: Kannadasan
- Based on: Chandra Natha by Sarat Chandra Chattopadhyay
- Produced by: Kannadasan
- Starring: T. R. Mahalingam; Pandari Bai; Mynavathi
- Cinematography: G. R. Nathan
- Music by: Viswanathan–Ramamoorthy
- Production company: Kannadasan Films
- Distributed by: ALS Productions
- Release date: 27 June 1958
- Country: India
- Language: Tamil

Maalaiyitta Mangai (transl. The woman who garlanded) is a 1958 Indian Tamil-language film directed by G. R. Nathan and produced by Kannadasan under his own production company Kannadasan Films. A remake of the 1957 Bengali film Chandranath, it is based on Sarat Chandra Chattopadhyay's eponymous novel. The film's soundtrack was composed by Viswanathan–Ramamoorthy. The film stars T. R. Mahalingam, Pandari Bai and Mynavathi, with Manorama (in her acting debut), Kaka Radhakrishnan and C. Lakshmi Rajyam in supporting roles. The film was released on 27 June 1958 and became a success.

== Plot ==
Chandru studies in London and returns to Tiruchirappalli. He lives with his aunt, Alankari and uncle and their daughter Kamalam. Kamalam is in love with Chandru but Chandru doesn't reciprocate it. Chandru goes to Madras to meet his friend's family. There, he meets Sarasu and they fall in love. Sarasu is from a poor family. They both get married and he brings her to Tiruchirappalli. Kamalam hates Sarasu in the beginning but when Sarasu is ready to give up her husband for Kamalam, she realises Sarasu's generous and gentle nature and they both become close. Sarasu gets pregnant and during the bangle ceremony, Alankari gets a picture of Sarasu's mother, Chellam and tells everyone that Chellam became pregnant after her husband went to jail and she is characterless. Chandru's mind changes and he makes Sarasu leave the house to uphold his family values. Sarasu comes to Madras and finds that her mother is dead and her father is in jail again. She finds a letter written by her mother which says she got pregnant by her father who used to escape from jail and meet her at night and that they both run away to Madras. This letter proves her mother's character. Sarasu delivers a boy and Kamalam's marriage arrangements are made with Chandru. Kamalam chastises Chandru for throwing the pregnant Sarasu out and says he will be a man only if he brings her back. Chandru realises his mistake and goes to apologise to Sarasu. He meets with an accident and Sarasu donates her blood and nurses him back to health. Sarasu becomes weak and on her death bed unites Chandru and Kamalam and dies.

== Cast ==
- T. R. Mahalingam as Chandru
- Pandari Bai as Sarasu
- Mynavathi as Kamalam
- Manorama as Anjalai
- Kaka Radhakrishnan as Sudalai
- C. Lakshmi Rajyam
- Padmini Priyadarshini
- C. K. Saraswathi as Alankari

== Production ==
Maalaiyitta Mangai is an adaptation of the novel Chandra Nath by Sarat Chandra Chattopadhyay. The film marked the acting debut of Manorama. In an interview, she recalled that it was Kannadasan who insisted her to perform the comical role for the film as portraying such characters would cement her status in the industry.

== Soundtrack ==
Music was composed by Viswanathan–Ramamoorthy and all lyrics were written by Kannadasan. According to Scroll.in writer Sruthisagar Yamunan, the song "Engal Dravida Ponnade" was a "direct challenge to the Congress party's version of nationalism". Kannadasan wrote the song with Mahalingam singing, as a challenge in response to actor/politician M. G. Ramachandran's prediction that the film would fail because of his belief that Mahalingam would not be accepted as a lead actor by party cadres. The song "Naan Andri Yaar Arivaar" is set to the raga Abhogi, and "Sentamizh Thenmozhiyal" is set to Kapi.

Songs	Singers	Length
"Sendhamizh Thenmozhiyaal"	T. R. Mahalingam	04:26
"Engal Dravida Ponnade"	T. R. Mahalingam	03:25
"Naan Indri Yaar Vaaruvaar"	T. R. Mahalingam & A. P. Komala	03:28
"Sendhamizh Thenmozhiyaal"	K. Jamuna Rani	04:48
"Ammaa Unnai Kondu Vanatthile"	V. N. Sundaram	01:05
"Akkarai Cheemaikku Pona Macchaan"	Seerkazhi Govindarajan & K. Jamuna Rani	04:10
"Maalayitta Mana Mudichu"	K. Jamuna Rani	03:28
"Mazhai Kooda Oru Naalil"	M. S. Rajeswari	03:43
"Illaram Onre Nallaram"	P. Suseela	04:11
"Saattai Illaa Pambarampol"	Thiruchi Loganathan & M. S. Rajeswari dialogues by Pandari Bai	04:06
"Thingal Mudi Soodum Malai"	T. R. Mahalingam	02:22
"Inaadum Immozhiyum.... Vetri Thrunaade"	A. P. Komala	02:26
"Annaiyin Naattai Pagaivargal"	T. S. Bagavathi	02:12
"Vil Enge Kanai Enge"	Seerkazhi Govindarajan	02:04
"Annam Pola Pennirukku"	P. Suseela	03:26
