= K. D. Santhanam =

Indian actor, writer and lyricist

- Born: India
- Occupations: Actor, writer and lyricist

K. D. Santhanam was an Indian actor, writer and lyricist who worked mainly in Tamil films.

== Career ==
He was a teacher at Madurai Sri Mangala Bala Gana Sabha, training young boys in dramatics. He was known as a strict disciplinarian. He punished erring boys by beating them with a cane, sometimes chasing after them as they ran to avoid punishment. One of his students became a renowned actor later who acknowledged to his friends that it was due to the discipline of his tutor that he was able to achieve success. The actor is Sivaji Ganesan. Later Santhanam has done minor character roles in which Sivaji Ganesan featured as the hero. This information has been recorded by writer Aroordas in his biography.

=== As an actor ===
He is a character artiste and has featured in more than 100 films.

In Pasamalar, he featured as Rajaratnam, a village senior who arranges the marriage of Sivaji Ganesan with M. N. Rajam.

"Ahaa Enna Porutham" is a hit song from the film Ragasiya Police 115. In between the verses one can hear a commanding voice asking "Ange ennamma saththam?" (What is the noise there?). The voice is of Santhanam, who featured as Dhanapal Muthaliar (a filmmaker), father of Neela (Jayalalithaa) in the film.

He featured as the father of M. G. Ramachandran in the film Aasai Mugam.

=== As a Lyricist ===
During the 1950s, Tamil Cinema had a number of classic lyricists who enriched the films with their variety of songs. Udumalai Narayana Kavi and Pattukkottai Kalyanasundaram wrote leftist oriented songs. A. Maruthakasi specialised in agricultural songs. Ku. Ma. Balasubramaniam wrote melodious songs. Kannadasan wrote on life and philosophy. Thanjai N. Ramaiah Dass wrote songs that appealed to the common man. Santhanam made his mark by writing songs with rhythmic flow known in Tamil as Santham.

A classic example of his "santham" song is "Thamizh Maalai Thanai Chooduvaal" from the film Ambikapathy. The sequence is: a poet takes up a challenge thrown by the King to sing 100 songs without referring to earthly pleasures, in order to win his daughter, the princess. Practically, in a film, it is impossible to sing 100 songs at a stretch. Santhanam wrote five songs for this scene. It was shown on screen using the running notation method. The fifth song becomes the 99th song. The poet gets excited. He sings the last five lines of the last verse in one breath. The word flow was such that it made the audience spellbound. This song is said to be the stamp song of Santhanam.

Music director Ilaiyaraaja once said that he got the inspiration for his song "Vaa Vennilla" from the film Mella Thirandhathu Kadhavu (1986) was a song written by Santhanam – "Vaan Meedhile Inba Thaen Maari Peyudhe" from the film Chandirani (1953).

His dance song "Laalu Laalu", written for the film Vijayakumari (1950) was rendered by Vyjayanthimala and became popular.

There are many noteworthy songs written by K. D. Santhanam.

== Filmography ==
Actor and Lyricist

Year	Film	Lyricist	Actor	Notes
1948	Gnana Soundari	check		1 Song
1948	Vedhala Ulagam	check		
1949	Kanniyin Kaadhali	check		2 Songs
1950	Parijatham	check		
1950	Vijayakumari	check		
1951	Kaithi	check		
1951	Mohana Sundaram	check		
1951	Sudharshan	check		
1952	Chinna Durai	check		
1952	Kaadhal	check		
1952	Velaikaran	check		
1953	Velaikari Magal	check		
1953	Azhagi	check		
1953	Chandirani	check		
1953	Devadas	check		
1953	Marumagal	check		
1954	Kalyanam Panniyum Brahmachari	check	check	
1955	Gomathiyin Kaadhalan	check	check	as Sinnavely Zamindar
1955	Menaka	check		
1955	Mudhal Thethi	check	check	
1957	Ambikapathy	check	check	as Sadayappa Vallal
1957	Chakravarthi Thirumagal	check		
1957	Manamagan Thevai	check		as Ponnambalam
1958	Pathi Bakthi		check	as Nallasivam Pillai
1958	Engal Kudumbam Perisu	check		
1959	Thaai Magalukku Kattiya Thaali	check		
1960	Aadavantha Deivam		check	as Singaram Pillai
1960	Aalukkoru Veedu	check		
1960	Kadavulin Kuzhandhai	check		
1960	Kairasi		check	
1960	Kavalai Illaadha Manithan		check	as Paramasivam
1960	Vijayapuri Veeran	check		
1961	Kumara Raja	check		
1961	Nallavan Vazhvan	check		
1961	Palum Pazhamum		check	as Paramasivam
1961	Pasamalar		check	as Paramasivam
1962	Aadi Perukku	check	check	as the publisher
1962	Senthamarai	check		
1963	Ezhai Pangalan		check	
1963	Kaanchi Thalaivan	check		
1964	Pasamum Nesamum		check	
1965	Aasai Mugam		check	as Siva Shankaran Pillai
1965	Kalangarai Vilakkam		check	as Neela's father
1968	Poovum Pottum		check	
1968	Ragasiya Police 115		check	as Dhanapal Muthaliar
1969	Akka Thangai		check	as Judge (Guest appearance)
1969	Vaa Raja Vaa		check	as the elder sculptor
1970	Thirumalai Thenkumari		check	as Chokkalingam, Tamil Professor
1971	Kankatchi		check	
1971	Kulama Gunama		check	
1972	Agathiyar	check		
1972	Sange Muzhangu		check	as Judge in the final scene
1973	Karaikkal Ammaiyar	check	check	as Wealthy Leprosy patient
1973	Rajaraja Cholan	check	check	as the chief sculptor
1973	Thirumalai Deivam	check		
	Ilaya Thalaimurai			
1977	Sri Krishna Leela	check		

=== Script writer ===
1. Chinna Durai (1952)

== Bibliography ==
- Krish. "Konjam Arattai Konjam Sharing" [Some Chat, Some Sharing] (in Tamil).
