= Manimekalai (1959 film) =

- Poster
- Directed by: V. S. Raghavan
- Screenplay by: Elangovan
- Based on: Manimekalai by Chithalai Chathanar
- Produced by: V. S. Narayanan
- Starring: T. R. Mahalingam; P. Bhanumathi
- Cinematography: Pachu
- Edited by: V. S. Rajan
- Music by: G. Ramanathan
- Production company: Sekhar Art Film Enterprises
- Release date: 1959
- Country: India
- Language: Tamil

Manimekalai is a 1959 Indian Tamil-language epic film directed by V. S. Raghavan and written by Elangovan, starring T. R. Mahalingam and P. Bhanumathi. It is based on the epic of the same name by Chithalai Chathanar.

== Plot ==
Manimekalai, the daughter of Madhavi and Kovalan, grows up to a beautiful woman. Since her grandmother Chitrapathi and mother Madhavi are renowned courtesans, Manimekalai too learns from them and is accomplished in music and dance. While Madhavi is deeply disturbed by Kovalan's cruel death and glowing reports of Kannagi's chastity bring about changes in her moral outlook, withdrawing from the life of a courtesan, she brings up her daughter in an atmosphere of renunciation and spirituality.

Prince Udhaya Kumaran is smitten by Manimekalai's bewitching beauty and professes his love for her. However, destiny had other plans for Manimekalai. The sea Goddess Manimekalai, carries her away from Kaveripoompattinam to the southern island of Manipallavam in Naga Nadu. Manimekalai wakes up from her trance and is mystified at the alien surroundings. While wandering about the island Maṇimekalai comes across the Dharma-seat, the seat on which Buddha had taught and appeased two warring Naga princes, and placed there by the God Indra. Those who worship it miraculously know their previous life. Manimekalai automatically worshiped it and recollects what has happened in her previous life. She comes to a place sanctified by Buddha, and in flash, revelations of her earlier birth dawn on her. She learns that Udhaya Kumaran was her husband in her previous birth. Goddess Manimekalai teaches her the art of astral travel and the secret of metamorphosing herself into another being.

Goddess Tivatilakai appears now before Manimekalai and inculcates in her the doctrines of Buddhism. Following the instructions of the Goddess, Manimekalai goes around a pond from the middle of which a bowl emerges and places itself on Manaimekalai's outstretched hands. This is the Amudhasurabhi (cow of abundance), the cornucopia that would never deplete which will always provide food to alleviate hunger. The goddess Tivatilakai also predicts that Bhikshu Aravaṇa Aḍigal in her native town will teach her more. Manimekalai then used the mantra which the sea goddess had given her and flies back to Kaveripoompattinam, Manimekalai reunites with Madhavi and narrates to her all that had transpired.

They meet Sage Aravana Adigal who informs them the history of the mystic Amudhasurabhi and expounds her the Buddha's Teaching and advises her about the nature of life. Manimekalai now takes to feeding the poor and needy with her magic bowl. The king who had earlier viewed her with suspicion now perceives her innate divinity and agrees to her proposal to turn the prison to a hall of charity where Buddhist monks could meditate and establish a hospice for the poor.

Udhaya Kumaran continues to pursue Manimekalai, despite her avowed spiritual inclinations to dedicate herself to a religious celibate life. In an effort to ward of his unwelcome advances, Manimekalai takes up the form of Kayachandika, an accursed Yaksha. Kayachanika's husband Kanjanan believes that Manimekalai is his wife who has been cured of her illness, and when he finds Udhaya Kumaran stalking her, kills him in fury.

Surmounting several hurdles that come in her way, Manimekalai learns the sacred tenets of various religions and finally takes up the sacred orders of Buddhist nun or Bhikshuni, spending the rest of her life in Kanchipuram and practices to rid herself from the bondage of birth and death and attain Nirvana.

== Cast ==
Actor
T. R. Mahalingam as Udhaya Kumaran
P. Bhanumathi as Manimekalai
N. S. Krishnan
T. A. Mathuram
Kaka Radhakrishnan
Serukalathur Sama as Aravana Adigal
O. A. K. Thevar
C. S. Pandiyan
Sandhya as Madhavi
G. Sakunthala
T. V. Kumudhini as Chitrapathi

== Soundtrack ==
The music was composed by G. Ramanathan. The song "Kanngalin Vennilave" attained popularity.

Song	Singers	Lyrics	Length
"Kanngalin Vennilave"	T. R. Mahalingam & P. Bhanumathi	Kambadasan	03:04
"Pazahangkaala Thamizharin Vaazhkai Nilai"	M. L. Vasanthakumari & N. L. Ganasaraswathi	A. Maruthakasi	03:25
"Unnai Kaana Enggum"	T. R. Mahalingam	A. Maruthakasi	03:59
"Avaniyil Pudhu Araneriye"	Thiruchi Loganathan & N. L. Ganasaraswathi	A. Maruthakasi	03:26
"Inbam Inbam Inbam Indha Ulaginile"	P. Bhanumathi	A. Maruthakasi	03:43
"Inge Vaa Sorgam Paar"	P. Leela & K. Abhayam	Kambadasan	04:07
"Aandavan Thamizhanada"	T. R. Mahalingam	Kannadasan	02:28
"Raajaa Nee Thoongalaamaa"	T. V. Rathnam	Thanjai N. Ramaiah Dass	02:20
"Varuga Varuga Sugumaaraa"	P. Leela, Radha Jayalakshmi & A. P. Komala	A. Maruthakasi	03:05
"Unda Naali Uduttha Naanku Mulam"	Seerkazhi Govindarajan	Kambadasan	02:54
"Ulagame Oru Sirachchaalai"	P. Bhanumathi	Kambadasan	02:48
"Adikkudhu Adikkudhu Unnai Kannda"	V. T. Rajagopalan & T. V. Rathnam	Thanjai N. Ramaiah Dass	03:09
"Aanndavan Padaippinile Naan Kannda"	T. R. Mahalingam	A. Maruthakasi	03:01
"Manadhai Kavarndha Mangai Varuvaalo"	Seerkazhi Govindarajan & Radha Jayalakshmi	A. Maruthakasi	04:06
"Vandhaayaa Magale Vandhaayaa"	G. Ramanathan	N. S. Chidambaram	04:16
"Aadhaaram Unnai Allaaal"	P. Bhanumathi	Kambadasan	04:31
"Thillana" Music	P. Bhanumathi	None	01:39

== Reception ==
Kanthan of Kalki said the film could be watched for Bhanumathi and Mahalingam's performances, and the music.
