= Parijatham (1950 film) =

- Theatrical release poster
- Directed by: K. S. Gopalakrishnan (Note: Not K. S. Gopalakrishnan)
- Screenplay by: Elangovan
- Based on: Narakasura epic
- Produced by: S. K. Sundararama Iyer
- Starring: T. R. Mahalingam; B. S. Saroja; M. V. Rajamma
- Cinematography: Jithen Banerji
- Edited by: A. V. Subba Rao
- Music by: C. R. Subbaraman; S. V. Venkatraman
- Production company: Lavanya Pictures
- Release date: 9 November 1950
- Country: India
- Language: Tamil

Parijatham (/pɑːrɪdʒɑːðəm/) is a 1950 Indian Tamil language Hindu mythological film directed by K. S. Gopalakrishnan, starring T. R. Mahalingam, M. V. Rajamma and B. S. Saroja. It was released on 9 November 1950.

== Plot ==
The film has three storylines.

The first line which is the first part is about the well known myth of Narakasura. Narakasura, the demon king has invincible powers due to the boons he had received from Devas and with all that he wreaks havoc on everyone. Narada knows that only Bama, the wife of Krishna who was Naragasura's mother in the previous birth can annihilate him. Narada adept in his covert ways to achieve his goals subtly gifts a parijatham flower to Krishna and make him in turn gift it to his first wife Rukmani. As expected the demon king dies at the hands of Bama but not before making a request that his day of death be celebrated by people as Deepavali.

The next story line has the same parijatham that breeds enmity in Bama against Rukmani. Finally she understands that Rukmani's devotion to Krishna far exceeds her own, a humbling experience.

There is a third line which is a comic interlude that intersects the film throughout. N.S.krishnan, T.A.Mathuram and side kicks Kaka Radhakrishnan and Pulimootai Ramasamy take care of that.

== Cast ==
Cast according to the opening credits:

Male

- T. R. Mahalingam as Krishnan
- N. S. Krishnan as Shri Kaman
- R. Balasubramaniam as Narakasuran
- Nagarcoil Mahadevan as Naradar
- T. K. Sampangi as Indran
- C. S. D. Singh as Muran
- Pulimoottai Ramasami as the fake Naradar
- C. S. Pandian as Kakkai
- T. V. Radhakrishnan as Brother
- Pappa Narayana Iyer as Kasyapar

Female

- M. V. Rajamma as Rukmani
- B. S. Saroja as Satyabhama
- T. A. Mathuram as Senthamarai
- T. S. Jaya as Lalitha
- P. G. Parvathi as Shyamala
- C. Vedhavalli as Indrani
- S. Menaka as Krishnamani

Dance

- Thara Chowdhry
- Lalitha-Padmini
- S. Kandamma

== Production ==
The film was produced by S. K. Sundararama Iyer under the banner Lavanya Pictures and was shot at Newtone and Vauhini studios. The film was directed by K. S. Gopalakrishnan B. A. Screenplay and dialogues were written by Elangovan. Jithen Banerji was in charge of cinematography while Kumaradevan was the operative cameraman. Editing was done by A. V. Subba Rao. Dinsha K. Tehrani was in charge of audiography. Art direction was done by F. Nagoor while Hiralal did the choreography.

== Soundtrack ==
Music was composed by C. R. Subbaraman and S. V. Venkatraman.

Song	Singers	Lyricist	Raga	Length (m:ss)
"Enathannai Unnai Pedhai"	T. V. Rathnam	Papanasam Sivan		02:15
"Thane Varuvaradi"	T. V. Rathnam	Papanasam Sivan		02:16
"Murali Gaana Vilola Muguntha"	K. V. Janaki	Papanasam Sivan		01:22
"Niyaayam Alladi Bhaamaa"	M. L. Vasanthakumari	Papanasam Sivan		02:26
"Yezhai En Meethu Paaraa"	Nagercoil K. Mahadevan	Papanasam Sivan		02:35
"Piraana Naathanae"	M. L. Vasanthakumari	Papanasam Sivan		02:20
"Maaya Chiripilae"	T. V. Rathnam	Papanasam Sivan	Desh	02:57
"Porumaiyae Inbam Tharum"	T. R. Mahalingam	Papanasam Sivan		02:11
"Anbinil Yaavume...Thulasi Jegan Maathaa"	M. L. Vasanthakumari	Papanasam Sivan	Desh	02:37
"Musical Dance"	Thara Chowdhry dance			03:31
"Vaan Nilavae Mana Mohana"	T. R. Mahalingam & T. V. Rathnam	Kambadasan		02:58
"Ulagathukae Unavalikkum"	S. V. Venkatraman & Jikki Group	Kambadasan		01:22
"Mathiyaa Vithiyaa"	C. R. Subbaraman & T. V. Rathnam	Kambadasan		03:38
"Jeeva Theebame Thalelo"	P. Leela & Jikki	Kambadasan		01:31
"Paarijaadha Poovu Namma"	N. S. Krishnan & T. A. Madhuram	Santhanakrishna Naidu		02:44
"Paadhkaakkanum Paangu Paarkanum"	N. S. Krishnan	Udumalai Narayana Kavi		03:55
"Manamagizh" (Musical drama)	K. V. Janaki & Jikki	K. D. Santhanam		06:18
"Ithu Thaguma Baamaa Kelai"	T. R. Mahalingam			02:12
"Pugazhnthu Pugazhnthu Uraikka"	M. L. Vasanthakumari			04:36
"Vantharul Endruraippai"	M. L. Vasanthakumari			02:22

== Reception ==
Swadesamitran praised the film citing the film moves faster without getting bored anywhere, while Dinamani wrote that propaganda humor is well handled and added the film had melodious songs and good direction, and Kalki praised the makers for adapting mythology stories nicely for present generation and added its a musical film due to good songs. Historian Randor Guy said the film is remembered for the satire-rich comedy of N. S. Krishnan.
