= Soubhagyavathi =

- Poster
- Directed by: Jampanna
- Screenplay by: Jampanna
- Story by: Jampanna
- Produced by: K. M. Naganna
- Starring: Gemini Ganesan; Savitri; S. V. Ranga Rao; K. A. Thangavelu; T. P. Muthulakshmi
- Cinematography: Laxman Gore; Masthan; Prakash; Durai
- Edited by: P. V. Manickam
- Music by: Pendyala; M. S. Gnanamani
- Production company: Nandhi Pictures
- Release date: 22 October 1957
- Running time: 161 minutes
- Country: India
- Language: Tamil

Soubhagyavathi (transl. Lucky woman) is 1957 Indian Tamil-language historical comedy film directed by Jampanna and produced by N. M. Naganna. The film's dialogue was written by A. L. Narayanan and the story was written by Jampanna. Music was by Pendyala Nageswara Rao and M. S. Gnanamani. The film stars Gemini Ganesan Savitri, K. A. Thangavelu S. V. Ranga Rao and T. P. Muthulakshmi, playing lead, with O. A. K. Devar, Kaka Radhakrishnan, M. S. Draupadi and Suryakala in supporting roles. It was released on 22 October 1957.

== Cast ==
- Gemini Ganesan as Kalatharan
- Savitri as Gowri
- S. V. Ranga Rao as Maha Bhairavan, bad magician
- K. A. Thangavelu as Vairavan, Kalatharan's Friend
- T. P. Muthulakshmi as Maragatham, Thandavam's sister
- Kaka Radhakrishnan as Thandavam, Gowri's cousin
- K. Suryakala as Princess Kalavalli
- O. A. K. Thevar as Kasi King
- M. S. Draupadi as Saradha, Gowri's Mother
- C. K. Saraswathi as Maragatham & Thandavam's Mother
- S. V. Subbaiah as Kalatharan's father
- E. V. Saroja as Kalavalli's palace dancer
- P. Saraswathi
- Kamakshi
- M. E. Madhavan
- M. R. Santhanam
- A. K. Chopra
- Ramaiah Shashthri
- Stunt Somu
- Krishnan

== Soundtrack ==
Music composed by Pendyala and M. S. Gnanamani. A song "Yedhuko, Iru Vizhi Marulum", written by Pattukottai Kalyanasundaram and sung by T. M. Soundararajan (in Raga Kalyani) was recorded and released as a vinyl record, but was not included in the film. Gnanamani composed music for only one song Ven Thamarai Raaniye in the raga Lathangi. A song Matha Maragatha from the Shyamala-Dandakam written by Kālidāsa was included in the film and sung by M. L. Vasanthakumari.

Song	Singer	Lyrics	Length
Matha Maragatha	M. L. Vasanthakumari	Mahakavi Kalidas	03:59
Ven Thamarai Raaniye	Sirkazhi Govindarajan and P. Leela	A. L. Narayanan	03:20
Alai Mevum Kadal Mele	P. Leela	A. L. Narayanan	
Ullum Puramum	P. Leela	Pattukkottai Kalyanasundaram	02:22
Vaa Vaa Vennilaave Vaa	P. Leela	Pattukkottai Kalyanasundaram	
Kaiyile Soolamum	P. Leela	Pattukkottai Kalyanasundaram	
Sagalamum Neeyae" (Oh Madha Bhavani)	P. Leela	Pattukkottai Kalyanasundaram	03:22
Singara Velavane	T. V. Rathnam	Pattukkottai Kalyanasundaram	02:48
Manjal Poosi Poo Mudichu	S. C. Krishnan and Swarnalatha	Pattukkottai Kalyanasundaram	03:40
Singara Poongavil Aaduvom	Jikki and group	Pattukkottai Kalyanasundaram	04:07
Oho Ho Machane Neengala	P. Leela, Jikki and group	Pattukkottai Kalyanasundaram	02:52
Chinna Maamaa Romba Nerama	Jikki	Pattukkottai Kalyanasundaram	
Karuvulagil Uruvaagi	T. M. Soundararajan	Pattukkottai Kalyanasundaram	
"Thillai Ambala Nadaraajaa"	T. M. Soundararajan	Pattukkottai Kalyanasundaram	03:57
Yeduko, Iru Vizhi Marulum	T. M. Soundararajan	Pattukkottai Kalyanasundaram	03:16
Paadhai Romba Neelamada	T. M. Soundararajan	Ra. Pazhanisami	
