= Ennai Paar =

- Poster
- Directed by: G. R. Nathan
- Screenplay by: S. Aiya Pillai; Thamizh Pithan
- Produced by: Cr. PL. Chidambaram; B. Arokiasamy
- Starring: T. R. Mahalingam; B. S. Saroja
- Music by: T. G. Lingappa
- Production company: Pazhaniyappa Productions
- Release date: 16 June 1961
- Running time: 2:55:56 (15834 ft.)
- Country: India
- Language: Tamil

Ennai Paar (transl. Look at me) is a 1961 Indian Tamil-language film directed by G. R. Nathan. The film stars T. R. Mahalingam and B. S. Saroja. It was released on 16 June 1961.

== Cast ==
The following list was adapted from the book Thiraikalanjiyam Part-2.

Male cast

- T. R. Mahalingam
- M. N. Nambiar
- V. R. Rajagopal
- T. Balasubramaniam
- Kaka Radhakrishnan

Female cast

- B. S. Saroja
- Pandari Bai
- L. Vijayalakshmi
- G. Sakunthala
- C. K. Saraswathi
- T. D. Kusalakumari

== Production ==
The film was produced by Cr. PL. Chidambaram and B. Arokiasamy under the banner Pazhaniyappa Productions and was directed by G. R. Nathan. S. Aiya Pillai and Thamizh Pithan wrote the dialogues.

== Soundtrack ==
Music was composed by T. G. Lingappa and the lyrics were penned by Kannadasan, A. Maruthakasi, Ku. Ma. Balasubramaniam, S. Aiya Pillai and Thamizh Pithan.

Song	Singer/s	Lyricist
"Kaatchiyum Neethan"	T. R. Mahalingam & S. Janaki	A. Maruthakasi
"Edhir Kondu Varaverkudhe"	T. R. Mahalingam & S. Janaki	A. Maruthakasi
"Vaanindri Nilavillai"	T. R. Mahalingam	A. Maruthakasi
"Paar Paar Ennai Paar"	A. L. Raghavan & K. Jamuna Rani	A. Maruthakasi
"Kanniyare Kanniyare"	P. Susheela	Kannadasan
"Vanjiyarin Kunamo"	P. Susheela	Kannadasan
"Moothor Sol Vaarthai Thaan"	V. N. Sundaram	Thamizh Pithan
"Kaadhal Enbathu Kathai Thaano"	K. Jamuna Rani	Ku. Ma. Balasubramaniam
"Chinna Ponne Ennai Paarthu"	S. C. Krishnan & K. Jamuna Rani	S. Aiya Pillai

== Reception ==
Kanthan of Kalki negatively reviewed the film and said, despite its title, was unwatchable.
