= Velaikaran =

Velaikaran or Velaikkaran (transl. Worker) may refer to:

- Velaikaran (1952 film), an Indian Tamil-language film directed by P. V. Krishnan
- Velaikkaran (1987 film), an Indian Tamil-language film directed by S. P. Muthuraman
- Velaikkaran (2017 film), an Indian Tamil-language film written and directed by Mohan Raja

== See also ==
- Velakkaran, a 1953 Indian Malayalam film
