= Thiruneelakandar =

- Poster
- Directed by: C. P. Jambulingam
- Written by: Kannadasan; Panchu Arunachalam
- Produced by: K. Selvaraj
- Starring: T. R. Mahalingam; Sowcar Janaki; R. S. Manohar; M. Bhanumathi
- Cinematography: T. K. Venkat; T. R. Raghunath; B. Nanchappan
- Edited by: B. K. Krishnan; C. B. S. Mani
- Music by: C. N. Pandurangan
- Production company: Sudarkodi Films
- Release date: 3 June 1972
- Running time: 138 minutes
- Country: India
- Language: Tamil

Thiruneelakandar is a 1972 Indian Tamil-language biographical film, directed by C P Jambulingam and produced by K. Selvaraj. The film script and lyrics were written by Kannadasan and Panchu Arunachalam. Music was by C. N. Pandurangan. It stars T. R. Mahalingam playing the title role of Tirunilakanta Nayanar, with Sowcar Janaki, R. S. Manohar, M. Bhanumathi and Gandhimathi in supporting roles. It was released on 3 June 1972.

== Plot ==
The movie narrates the life tale of Thiruneelakandar. Originally agnostic, he becomes a staunch devotee of Lord Shiva singing his own composed hymns. He marries Neelavathy and leads a pious life as a potter. However, he embarks on an affair with Kalavathy which leads to estrangement from his wife vowing to never touch her or any other woman ever again. He goes on singing praises of the lord into ripe old age until the lord appears as an old hermit, puts him to test and revives the couple's youth and takes them with him.

== Cast ==
- T. R. Mahalingam as Ambalavaanar/Thiruneelakandar
- Sowcar Janaki as Neelavathy
- R. S. Manohar as Lord Shiva
- M. Bhanumathi as Kalavathy
- Gandhimathi as Sinthamani
- Suruli Rajan as Murugan
- Pushpamala as Valli
- A. Veerappan as Singaram
- S. D. Subbulakshmi as Woman Saint
- Usilai Mani as Chinna Paiya

== Soundtrack ==
Music was composed by C. N. Pandurangan and lyrics were written by Kannadasan and Panju Arunachalam.

Song	Singer	Length
"Nattiya Kalai"	T. R. Mahalingam	3:48
"Ambalavaananai Nambiya"	T. R. Mahalingam	3:45
"Kadalil Vizhuntha Or Kakkai"	T. R. Mahalingam	3:15
"Thaayae Thandhaiyae"	T. R. Mahalingam	1:52
"Yethanai Per Unnakku"	T. R. Mahalingam	2:55
"Sivaleelai En Veettila"	T. R. Mahalingam	3:12
"Aandavan Thaan Vanthu"	T. R. Mahalingam	1:27
"Pantha Pasa Kattukulle"	T. R. Mahalingam S. Janaki	3:13
"Kaalaiyil Naan Oru Kanavu"	S. Janaki	4:04
"Mugam Paarthathu Pothatha"	P. Leela	3:18
"Thathuvathil Naan Or Sanyasi" (Villayattu Karanukku)	K. M. Mani Rajan	4:25
