= Thanthaikku Pin Thamaiyan =

- Directed by: G. R. Rao
- Written by: M. M. A. Subbaiah Thevar
- Produced by: M. M. A. Subbaiah Thevar
- Starring: T. R. Mahalingam; Pandari Bai; Mynavathi; N. N. Kannappa
- Cinematography: C. V. Moorthi
- Edited by: M. Jagannathan; S. Thanu
- Music by: K. V. Mahadevan
- Production company: Surya Films
- Release date: 14 January 1960
- Running time: 166 minutes
- Country: India
- Language: Tamil

Thanthaikku Pin Thamaiyan (transl. After father its brother) is a 1960 Indian Tamil language film directed by G. R. Rao. The film stars T. R. Mahalingam and Pandari Bai.

== Plot ==
Routine story of two brothers - one sacrificing for another.

== Cast ==
Cast according to the songbook:

Actors

- T. R. Mahalingam as Mathivanan
- T. K. Ramachandran as Thillaiyambalam
- N. N. Kannappa as Gunaseelan
- D. Balasubramanyam as Sundaram Pillai
- Kaka, Radhakrishnan as Ezhusuthu
- E. R. Sahadevan as Karunanyam Pillai
- O. A. K. Thevar as Kathirvelu Pillai

Guest Artistes

- S. V. Sahasranamam as Judge
- Mynavathi as Mathivathani
- K. Malathi as Mother's Association President

Female cast

- Pandari Bai as Chandra
- C. K. Saraswathi as Kanakavalli
- D. Kamini as Rani
- C. D. Vanaja as Pankajam
- Manorama as Patharai Mathu
- S. M. Saroja as Naluveli

== Production ==
The film was produced by M. M. A. Subbaiah Thevar, brother of Sandow M. M. A. Chinnappa Thevar under the banner Surya Films. He also wrote the story and dialogues. The film was directed by G. R. Rao. C. V. Moorthi was in charge of cinematography while the editing was done by M. Jagannathan and S. Thanu. Art direction was by C. Raghavan. Choreography was handled by Chopra, V. Madhavan and Rajkumar. K. G. Velappan did the still photography. The film was shot at Majestic Studios and was processed at Madras Cine Lab.

== Soundtrack ==
The Music was composed by K. V. Mahadevan.

Song	Singer/s	Lyricist
"Udhaya Sooriyan Ezhunthaan"	T. M. Soundararajan	A. Maruthakasi
"Sivakkuthadi Kannam"	K. Jamuna Rani & group	A. Maruthakasi
"Inbam Malarum Anbile"	T. R. Mahalingam	A. Maruthakasi
"Kaaviriyin Neeraadi Kalai Valarkkum"	T. R. Mahalingam	Kannadasan
"Yeru Pondra Thamizh Magane"	T. R. Mahalingam	Kannadasan
"Otrumaiyaal Vetriyelaam"	T. R. Mahalingam	Kannadasan
"Kulungi Vizhum Maaligaiyil"	T. R. Mahalingam	Kannadasan
"Malarum Manamum Poliruppom"	A. L. Raghavan, Jikki	Velsamy Kavi
"Oho Endhan Raajaa"	Jikki	Velsamy Kavi
"Pozhaikka Theriya Venum"	S. C. Krishnan, L. R. Eswari	A. S. Narayanan
"Aananda Vaazhvin"	K. Jamuna Rani, L. R. Eswari	Kovai Kumaradevan
