= Thenkarai =

Thenkarai may refer to places in India:

- Thenkarai, Coimbatore, Tamil Nadu
- Thenkarai, Theni, Tamil Nadu
- Thenkarai, Madhurai, Tamil Nadu
