= Dhaasippen =

1943 film by Ellis R. Dungan

- Poster
- Directed by: Ellis R. Dungan
- Written by: Pammal Sambandha Mudaliar
- Starring: T. R. Mahalingam; M. G. Ramachandran; N. S. Krishnan; T. A. Madhuram
- Edited by: R. S. Mani
- Music by: Lalitha Venkatraman; S. Rajeswara Rao
- Production company: Devi Films
- Release date: 3 March 1943
- Running time: 150 minutes
- Country: India
- Language: Tamil

Dhaasippen, also Dhaasippenn (transl. Dancing Girl) is a 1943 Tamil-language film directed by Ellis R. Dungan and produced by Bhuvaneswai Pictures. The lead actors are T. R. Mahalingam and M. G. Ramachandran. The film was scored by Lalitha Venkatraman and S. Rajeswara Rao. The film has had two other titles: Jyothi Malar and Thumbai Mahatmyam. The film is based on a folk tale about a girl becoming a devadasi and dedicating her life to worshipping Lord Shiva and refusing to follow the traditional path of marrying a man. Dhaasippen performed well and became a box office hit. But no print of the film is known to survive, making it a lost film.

== Plot ==
M. G. Ramachandran as Shiva, with Balasaraswathi as devadasi, much to her delight it was one of MGR early movies, he played the divine role in some and looked impressive. The melodious songs and dances of Balasaraswathi and MGR provide a visual delight on the screen.

— Randor Guy

A young devadasi (R. Balasaraswathi) is forced by her family to yield to lustful zamindar. The devadasi refuses to do this because she is devoted to Lord Shiva and she wishes to marry her lover (T. R. Mahalingam). She encounters many hurdles on her journey. The zamindar attempts to kidnap her to make her his mistress. However, his attempts fail thanks to the intervention of Shiva and his consort, Parvathi. There is a parallel story in the film about her married sister (T. A. Madhuram) who carries on an affair with a travelling sari salesman (N. S. Krishnan). Her sister's illicit romance is always thwarted by the appearance of a fierce looking giant (Pulimooti Ramasamy). Eventually the devadasi grows tired of her life. Answering her prayers, Shiva transforms her into the thumbhai plant—the flowers of which are offered to Lord Shiva during worship. Hence, the film also had the title Thumbhai Mahatmayam.

== Cast ==
- T. R. Mahalingam
- M. G. Ramachandran as Shiva
- R. Balasaraswathi
- M. R. Santhanalakshmi as Parvathi
- N. S. Krishnan
- T. A. Madhuram
- Krishnamurthy
- M. R. Santhanalakshmi
- V. K. Das as the zamindar
- "Pulimoottai" Ramasamy

== Production ==
Dhaasippen was based on a play of the same name written by Pammal Sambandha Mudaliar. It was produced by Buvaneshwari Pictures and directed by Ellis R. Dungan. T. R. Mahalingam played the lead role and M. G. Ramachandran (later Chief Minister of Tamil Nadu) was cast in a supporting role. Comic relief was provided by the husband-and-wife comedy duo of N. S. Krishnan and T. A. Madhuram. Due to the shortage of film negatives during World War II, this film was short (13,623 feet) when compared to the Tamil films of the 1930s. It was released on 3 March 1943 in tandem with another film – Kizhattu Mappilai (கிழட்டு மாப்பிள்ளை).

Dhaasippen was shot at Minerva Movietone in Bombay and Newtone Studios in Madras (now Chennai) edited by R. S. Mani. Mani began his career as an editor and worked with Dungan on Kalamegam. He became a successful filmmaker with hits such as Kannagi, Kubera Kuchela, and Krishna Bakthi, and Maaman Magal. Later, he became religious and left the filmmaking industry. Dungan made several cultural films based mostly on mythology folk tales without knowing Tamil. Dnugan directed other classic films such as Sathi Leelavathi, Sakuntalai, Meera, Kalamegam, and Manthiri Kumari (in which he shared credit with its producer T. R. Sundaram).

== Soundtrack ==
The music in the film was composed by Lalitha Venkatraman and S. Rajeswara Rao. There were nearly 30 songs including duets. Lalitha Venkatraman, a noted singer of the day, also played Veena in the movie. She had previously made history by being the first female in Tamil cinema to sing off screen in the AVM film, Nandakumar (1938).
