= Laila Majnu (1950 film) =

- Theatrical release poster
- Directed by: F. Nagoor
- Screenplay by: Vallikannan
- Based on: Layla and Majnun
- Starring: T. R. Mahalingam; M. V. Rajamma
- Cinematography: Jitten Bannerji; P. S. Selvaraj
- Edited by: V. B. Nataraja Mudaliar
- Music by: S. V. Venkatraman
- Production company: Balaji Pictures
- Distributed by: National Pictures
- Release date: 1 March 1950
- Country: India
- Language: Tamil

Laila Majnu is a 1950 Indian Tamil-language historical romance film directed by F. Nagoor. Based on the ancient Arabian tale of Layla and Majnun, the film stars T. R. Mahalingam and M. V. Rajamma as the title characters. It was released on 1 March 1950, and did not do well at the box office.

== Cast ==
Male cast

- T. R. Mahalingam as Khayas
- N. S. Krishnan as Anvar
- S. V. Sahasranamam as Salam
- R. Balasubramaniam as Sardar
- G. M. Basheer as Amir Amri
- K. P. Kamakshias Moulvi Sahib
- Radhakrishnan as Mohideen
- Duraipandian as Syed
- Hariharan as Sardar's friend
- Thiruvenkatam as Adil
- George Thorpe as Kapoor
- M. R. Krishnasami & Party as Stunt

Female cast

- M. V. Rajamma as Laila
- T. A. Mathuram as Noor Jahan
- V. N. Janaki as Zarina
- P. S. Sivabhagyam as Zahira
- T. S. Jaya as Moulvi's Wife
- K. T. Dhanalakshmi as Hamida
- Kannamba as Salima
- C. R. Rajakumari as Young Khayas
- Kusalakumari as Young Laila

Dance

- Lalitha & Padmini

== Production ==
Laila Majnu is based on the Arabic tale of Layla and Majnun. The film was produced and directed by F. Nagoor under the banner Balaji Pictures and was funded by M. K. Thyagaraja Bhagavathar. Vallikkannan wrote the dialogues. Cinematography was by Jitten Bannerji and the operative cameraman was P. S. Selvaraj. V. B. Nataraja Mudaliar did the editing. Art direction was also done by F. Nagoor. Choreography was by Hiralal, Ganesh and Joshi. The film was shot at Newtone studios and the stills were taken by R. N. Nagaraja Rao and Gnanam. Although the film was primarily in black and white, it contained a few sequences in colour.

== Soundtrack ==
Music was composed by S. V. Venkatraman, while the lyrics were penned by Lakshmanadas and Kambadasan.

Song	Singer/s	Length
"Anudhinam Sandoshamakave"	T. R. Mahalingam & T. S. Bagavathi	
"Thara Thalathaiye"	T. A. Mathuram	
"Varuvaaro Maangkuyile Sol"	T. R. Mahalingam & T. S. Bagavathi	
"Sanjalak Kadalile.... Yaar Poi Solluvar"	T. R. Mahalingam	02:47
"Meena Mani Izhaitha Chandirane"		
"Paaril Anaathi Naanallave"	T. R. Mahalingam	
"Ezhil Vaanil Vilaiyaaduvome"	T. R. Mahalingam	
"Sohnaa Illannaa Luunaa, Sollu"	N. S. Krishnan & T. A. Mathuram	03:14
"Parandhu Selludhe En Paingkili"	T. R. Mahalingam	02:57
"Vaazhvil Anbaale" (Dance Song)	-	
"Paingiliye Mano Raagini"	T. R. Mahalingam & T. S. Bagavathi	02:34
"Vanna Maane Un Ninaivaale"	T. R. Mahalingam	03:10
"Neethiyaguma.... Aavi Sorudhe"		02:59
"Kadhalin Madhiyo"	T. S. Bagavathi	02:42
"Maadharase Mayile"	T. R. Mahalingam	02:22
"Paavi Ennai Poloruvar"	T. R. Mahalingam & T. S. Bagavathi	03:05

== Release ==
Laila Majnu was released on 1 March 1950, and did not do well at the box office.
