= Mahakavi Kalidas (1966 film) =

- Theatrical release poster
- Directed by: R. R. Chandran
- Written by: Ku. Ma. Balasubramaniam
- Produced by: R. R. Chandran
- Starring: Sivaji Ganesan
- Cinematography: R. R. Chandran
- Edited by: P. V. Narayanan
- Music by: K. V. Mahadevan
- Production company: Kalpana Kala Mandhir
- Distributed by: Sivaji Films
- Release date: 19 August 1966
- Running time: 143 minutes
- Country: India
- Language: Tamil

Mahakavi Kalidas (transl. The Great Poet Kalidas) is a 1966 Indian Tamil-language biographical film produced and directed by R. R. Chandran, starring Sivaji Ganesan. It is based on the life of the Sanskrit poet Kalidasa. The film was released on 19 August 1966.

== Cast ==
- Sivaji Ganesan as Chinnaiah / Kalidas
- Sowcar Janaki as Princess Sangeetha Vani / Vilasavathi
- R. Muthuraman as King Boja
- L. Vijayalakshmi as Mohanangi
- S. V. Sahasranamam (guest role)
- R. S. Manohar as Ambarisan
- V. K. Ramasamy as Konar
- Nagesh as Oviyar (guest role)
- A. Karunanidhi as Suppan
- C. K. Saraswathi as Chinnaiah's mother
- K. B. Sundarambal as Kali
- E. R. Sahadevan as King
- Usilaimani as Poet
- Karuppu Subbiah as Poet
- Karikol Raju as Barber
- C. S. Pandian
- S. V. Sivanandham
- G. Sakunthala
- M. S. Malathi
- P. K. Vijayarani

== Production ==
The scenes of Kalidas worshipping goddess Kali was filmed at Vijaya Vauhini Studios.

== Soundtrack ==
Music was composed by K. V. Mahadevan. The "Sakunthalai" music drama was not included in the film but was released on gramophone record.

Song	Singer/s	Lyricist	Length
"Senru Vaa Magane"	K. B. Sundarambal	Kannadasan	
"Kaalathil Azhiyaada"	K. B. Sundarambal	Kannadasan	3.15
"Kuzhandhaiyin Kodugal Oviyama .. Kalaimagal Enakoru"	T. M. Soundararajan & P. Susheela	Kannadasan	
"Kallaayi Vandhavan Kadavulamma"	T. M. Soundararajan	Kannadasan	03:35
"Maanikka Veenaiye...Yaar Tharuvar"	T. M. Soundararajan	Kannadasan	03:00
"Malarum Vaan Nilavum"	T. M. Soundararajan	Kannadasan	
"Chinnaiya Endrazhaitha"	T. M. Soundararajan	Kannadasan	
"Thangame Thaamarai Mottukalaagi"	T. M. Soundararajan	Ku. Ma. Balasubramaniam	
"Pann Patta Nenjile Punn Pattadho"	T. M. Soundararajan	Ku. Ma. Balasubramaniam	
"Piraputtren Kaaliyidam"	T. M. Soundararajan	Ku. Ma. Balasubramaniam	
"Ariyaadha Maandhargale"	T. M. Soundararajan	Ku. Ma. Balasubramaniam	
"Deivathin Avadhaara Idhikaasa"	K. B. Sundarambal	Ku. Ma. Balasubramaniam	
"Malarum Vaan Nilavum"	P. Susheela	Ku. Ma. Balasubramaniam	
"Maamunivan Kaushikane Thavam Purindhan" "Sakunthalai" music drama	T. M. Soundararajan, P. Susheela, S. V. Ponnusamy & Soolamangalam Rajalakshmi	Ku. Ma. Balasubramaniam	

== Reception ==
Kalki praised the film for its songs and the cast's performance.
