= Ragasiya Police 115 =

1968 film by B. R. Panthulu

- Theatrical release poster
- Directed by: B. R. Panthulu
- Story by: G. Balasubramaniam
- Produced by: B. R. Panthulu
- Starring: M. G. Ramachandran; Jayalalithaa; Venniradai Nirmala
- Cinematography: V. Ramamoorthy
- Edited by: R. Devarajan
- Music by: M. S. Viswanathan
- Production company: Padmini Pictures
- Release date: 11 January 1968
- Running time: 163 minutes
- Country: India
- Language: Tamil

Ragasiya Police 115 (transl. Secret Agent 115) is a 1968 Tamil-language spy film, directed and produced by B. R. Panthulu. The film stars M. G. Ramachandran, J. Jayalalithaa, and Venniradai Nirmala. The supporting cast included M. N. Nambiar, S. A. Ashokan and Nagesh. It was released on 11 January 1968, and ran for 100 days in theatres, becoming a hit at the box office.

== Plot ==
Upon his return from a particularly dangerous but successful mission abroad, Ramu, the secret agent 115 of Intelligence Bureau witnesses striking revelations about the reselling of classified information. Ramu suspects a rich family was involved in the crime. Ramu is sent to spy on the family, which is led by Dhanapal Mudaliar and his son Nambirajan.

Ramu leaves his hotel room, thwarting the "welcoming committee" which waits for him. At another location, a mother and daughter are seen comforting each other. They were Ramu's family, including his younger sister Parvathi and their blind mother. Parvathi is worried about Ramu, but given her mother's plight, she could not share the reason for her sorrow.

== Cast ==
Male cast

- M. G. R as Ramu
- M. N. Nambiar as Inspector Kumar and Krishnan
- Ashokan as Nambirajan
- Nagesh as Balakrishnan
- K. D. Santhanam as Dhanapal Mudaliar
- Rama Rao as Hotel Receptionist
- Thiruchi Soundararajan as Head of Secret Service
- Ennathai Kannaiah as Doctor
- N. S. Nataraj
- Thirupathisami as Singapuram
- Justin as Judoka

Female cast

- Jayalalithaa as Neela
- Vennira Aadai Nirmala as Kamala Devi
- Kumari Padmini as Parvathi
- Ammukutty Pushpamala as Nayaki
- S. N. Lakshmi as Kamakshi
- Pappamma

Support cast

- Raja, Usilai Mani, Kumar, Pasupathi, Dharmalingam, Kamakshi, Nataraj, Naveendran, Rangoon Rajammal, Indira.

== Production ==
Midway through the shooting of the film, Ramachandran was shot in the throat by M. R. Radha. Although he survived the attack, his voice was damaged, but he dubbed his own lines for the film.

== Soundtrack ==
The soundtrack was composed by M. S. Viswanathan.

Track listing
No.	Title	Lyrics	Singer(s)	Length
1.	"Kannae Kaniyae"	Kannadasan	T. M. Soundararajan, P. Susheela	3.51
2.	"Kannil Therikindra"	Kannadasan	T. M. Soundararajan, L. R. Eswari	3.16
3.	"Paal Tamizh Paal"	Vaali	T. M. Soundararajan, L. R. Eswari	3.11
4.	"Enna Porutham"	Kannadasan	T. M. Soundararajan, P. Susheela	4.00
5.	"Santhanam Kungumam"	Kannadasan	P. Susheela
6.	"Unnai Yenni Yennai"	Kannadasan	P. Susheela

== Reception ==
Kalki negatively reviewed the film, saying it had 115 flaws, though the critic appreciated Ashokan's performance.
