= Agathiyar =

1972 film

- Poster
- Directed by: A. P. Nagarajan
- Written by: A. P. Nagarajan
- Starring: Sirkazhi Govindarajan
- Cinematography: W. R. Subba Rao
- Edited by: T. Vijayarangam
- Music by: Kunnakudi Vaidyanathan
- Production company: Sri Vijayalakshmi Pictures
- Release date: 15 January 1972
- Running time: 153 minutes
- Country: India
- Language: Tamil

Agathiyar is a 1972 Indian Tamil-language Hindu mythological film written, directed, and produced by A. P. Nagarajan. The soundtrack was composed by Kunnakudi Vaidyanathan. The film stars Sirkazhi Govindarajan playing the main character, T. R. Mahalingam, A. V. M. Rajan, Kumari Padmini, R. S. Manohar, Suruli Rajan, Manorama and Sridevi were in supporting roles. This film ran for 100 days and won widespread appreciation. The film was dubbed into Hindi under the title Maharish in 1986.

== Plot ==
The story is about Agathiyar Muni, who is considered to be the embodiment of one of celestial intellectuals who descended on earth to enlighten human beings. During the wedding of Shiva and Goddess Parvati, the earth tilted to the northern side, as the whole world was witnessing the marriage. Shiva gave the responsibility of balancing the earth to Agathiyar by going to the southern side. Agathiyar is also given the additional responsibility of spreading goodness and equality. He has the additional task of spreading the Tamil language. Many small stories between heaven and earth are interwoven in the movie. The stories teach one to lead a simple existence without ego. It also shows how Agathiyar's journey facing Vindhya Mount, River Kaveri, Vilvala/Vaathapi, Lord Murugan, A Farmer,Ravana, Urvashi, Tholkappiyan thereby teaching them the greatness of humility.

== Cast ==
Actors

- Sirkazhi Govindarajan as Agathiyar
- T. R. Mahalingam as Narathar
- A. V. M. Rajan as Lord Siva
- R. S. Manohar as Ravaneswaran/Langeswaran
- T. K. Bhagavathy as Devendran
- Sasikumar as Jayandran (Devendran's son)
- Sivakumar as Poet Tholkappiayan
- Suruli Rajan
- A. K. Veerasamy as Saint
- Usilai Mani as Boodham
- O. A. K. Thevar as Vinthiyan (Vindhya mount)
- T. N. Sivathanu as Vadhaapi or Saththamuni
- Typist Gopu as Vilvala or Saagaramuni
- E. R. Sahadevan
- K. D. Santhanam
- Shanmugasundari
- Master Sekhar
- Master Sridhar
- Gundu Karuppaiah
- S. Ramarao

Actresses

- Kumari Padmini as Goddess Parvathy
- Lakshmi as Ponni/Kaviri
- C. R. Vijayakumari as Mandothari
- Manorama as Selli
- A. Sakunthala as Urvasi
- M. Bhanumathi as Kakkai Padiniyar
- Rajakokila
- Baby Sridevi as Lord Murugan
- V. Vasantha
- P. Seethalakshmi
- Kalasree

== Soundtrack ==
Music was composed by Kunnakudi Vaidyanathan. The song "Isaiyai Tamizhai" is set in Kharaharapriya raga. The song "Vendriduven" is a ragamalika comprising 16 ragas and is composed in such a way that the name of the raga used in each stanza is a word play on a common Tamil word which sounds similar to the raga's name starting with Nattai, Bhairavi, Todi, Arabhi, Shanmukhapriya, Darbar, Hamsadhwani, Vasantha, Mohanam, Manolayam, Bageshri, Saranga, Kamboji, Gowrimanohari, Kalyani and Saraswathi.

| Songs | Singers | Lyrics | Length (m:ss) |
|---|---|---|---|
| "Ulagam Samanilai Peravendum" | Sirkazhi Govindarajan | Ulundurpet Shanmugam | 3:06 |
| "Aandavan Tharisaname" | T. R. Mahalingam | Ulundurpet Shanmugam | 3:42 |
| "Malainindra Thirukumara" | T. R. Mahalingam | Ulundurpet Shanmugam | 2:20 |
| "Ventriduven Unnai" | T. M. Soundararajan, Sirkazhi Govindarajan | Ulundurpet Shanmugam | 8:07 |
| "Thaayir Chirandha" | T. K. Kala | Poovai Senguttuvan | 2:55 |
| "Kannai Pole Mannai Kakkum" | L. R. Eswari and Chorus | Puthuneri Subramnyam | 3:55 |
| "Naadanthai Vaali Kaveri" | Sirkazhi Govindarajan | K. D. Santhanam | 3:33 |
| "Thalaiva Thavaputhalvaa" | M. R. Vijaya and P. Radha | K. D. Santhanam | 4:35 |
| "Isaiyai Thamizhai" | Sirkazhi Govindarajan, T. R. Mahalingam | K. D. Santhanam | 3:29 |
| "Namachivayamena Solvome" | Sirkazhi Govindarajan, T. R. Mahalingam | Era. Pazhanisamy | 4:17 |
| "Muzhu Muthar Porulae" | T. R. Mahalingam | Nellai Arulmani | 2:10 |
