= Thaai Magalukku Kattiya Thaali =

- Theatrical release poster
- Directed by: R. R. Chandiran
- Screenplay by: Rama Arangannal
- Story by: C. N. Annadurai
- Produced by: R. R. Chandiran
- Starring: M. G. Ramachandran; N. Jamuna; P. Kannamba
- Cinematography: R. R. Chandiran
- Edited by: P. V. Manickam
- Music by: T. R. Pappa
- Production company: Kalpana Kala Mandir
- Release date: 31 December 1959
- Running time: 160 minutes
- Country: India
- Language: Tamil

Thaai Magalukku Kattiya Thaali (transl. The thaali tied by a mother to her daughter) is a 1959 Indian Tamil-language film produced, directed and photographed by R. R. Chandiran. The film stars M. G. Ramachandran, N. Jamuna and P. Kannamba. It was released on 31 December 1959 and became a box-office bomb.

== Plot ==
Sundharam Mudhaliyar is a wealthy man living with his daughter Kaveri. Sahadevan lives with his wife Thanabakkiam and daughter Sundhari. During a dance competition at a school function, Sundhari wins the first prize and Sundharam cannot accept this as Sahadevan's family belongs to an inferior caste and owes money to him. Sundharam magnifies this simple misunderstandings which results in the apparent death of Sahadevan. To cover this up, Sundharam disposes off the body into a river and cooks up a story that Sahadevan had run away to avoid paying his debts. Sahadevan survives but suffers from amnesia. Sundharam seizes Sahadevan's house and land as a compensation for his debts and Thanabakkiam and Sundhari have to leave to a smaller house in another village. There Thanabakkiam saves Kanagasundharam alias Kanagu from drowning in the river and thanked by Kanagu's father Loganayagam of the assistance rendered despite the difference in their caste. Kanagu and Sundhari become close friends and grow up to be lovers.

Loganayagam who would like to renovate the school requests Kanagu to seek donation from Sundharam. Kanagu and his friend Dhuraiappan leaves to Sundharam's place when they bump into an arrogant and modern girl Kaveri. When Kanagu goes back she is shocked to learn that Kanagu is her relative and falls for him. Meanwhile, the villagers and relatives of Kanagu tries to drive Kannamba and Sundhari in order to separate Kanagu and Sundhari from getting married but they fail to do so when Kanagu intervenes. Thanabakkiam discovers Kanagu and Sundhari's relationship and tries to advise Kanagu but Kanagu promises to marry Sundhari. The villagers and relatives of Kanagu complain to Loganayagam about this but Loganayagam agrees to get them married. Matters gets worse when this news spreads to the whole village which paints Kanagu as a womaniser. Fortunately Loganayagam does not believe this and sends for Thanabakkiam to arrange their children's wedding.

Things become serious when Sundharam wishes to get Kaveri married to Kanagu and warns Loganayagam that should that not happen, Loganayagam needs to settle Rs 2 lakhs that he is indebted to Sundaram. Upon knowing this, Kanagu and Sundhari registers their wedding without anyone's knowledge, only to be witnessed by Dhuraiappan. The villagers come to a conclusion to disown Logunayagam's family and no workers would work for them. Kanagu ploughs the soil and works in the fields himself. Logu unable to bear all this requests Thanabakkiam to accept compensation and to leave that village. Thanabakkiam gets even furious when she learns that Sundhari is pregnant and Sundhari tries to commit suicide by jumping into the well but saved by Thanabakkiam. When Loganayagam learns about the wedding registration, he apologises to Kanagu and requests Kanagu to inform this to Thanabakkiam but Thanabakkiam's house is engulfed by fire. All thought that Thanabakkiam and Sundhari had perished in the fire but actually both had left the village.

In another town, a rich landlord Arumainayagam is looking for his long lost younger brother in order to surrender all his wealth. Sundharam learns that Loganayagam is the person but hatches a plan to get Kaveri to be married to Kanagu in order to swindle all the wealth. Sundharam threatens by using Loganayagam's signature to prepare a letter saying that Thanabakkiam's house was burnt by his order. Knowing this, Kanagu pretends to agree marrying Kaveri but Loganayagam who is not in favour of this becomes sick and dies on the wedding day. Thanabakkiam ties a thali to Sundhari and advises that thali is important to a married lady even though wedding registration took place.

Kaveri soon learns of Sundharam's deeds. Kanagu donates all his land to the villagers and turns his house to a school and the villagers apologises on the guilt of defaming Kanagu before. Kaveri too donates her jewellery to the needy. Sundharam opposes to this but Kanagu settles Loganayagam's debt to Sundharam. Kanagu requests the villagers to be in the registration office tomorrow to transfer his land to their names and to stop this Sundharam accuses of Kanagu is mentally unstable and admits Kanagu to a mental sanatorium without anyone's knowledge.

Ezhumalai who works for Arumainayagam takes in Thanabakkiam and Kaveri as workers in the plantations. Balu is the manager of Arumainayagam, lusts for Sundhari and disturbs her a lot. Sundhari delivers a baby boy and at the same time Kaveri is sad to learn about this and as Kanagu goes missing without informing her. Sundharam's requests Balu to join as his sidekick in order to murder Arumainayagam, but Balu with the alliance of Gopal who works in a circus, decides to have the Arumainayagam's wealth for themselves. A series of event occurs before the climax where Kaveri learns about Sundharam's plan to murder Arumainayagam, Balu and Gopal abducts Sundhari, Sahadevan who sees Thanabakkiam remembers his past and Kanagu escapes from the mental sanatorium. While Kaveri was driving speedily to save Arumainayagam, Kanagu saves a baby from being hit by the car on the road, not knowing that the baby was his son. Kaveri steers away from the road and hits a tree and her last wish is that Kanagu to save Arumainayagam and do not hand over Sundharam to the police and dies.

Balu and Gopal forcefully obtain the signature of Arumainayagam and leaves the job of murdering him to Sundharam. Kanagu appears on the scene and saves Arumainayagam. Balu and Gopal escapes. Sundharam learns of Kaveri's death, repents and informs Arumainayagam that Kanagu is none other than the latter's nephew and stabs himself. Dhuraiappan meets Kanagu and tells about Sundhari's abduction where Kanagu is shocked upon discovering that Sundhari is alive. Kanagu and Dhuraiappan saves Sundhari and the police arrest Balu and Gopal. Arumainayagam and Kanagu share their wealth with the workers.

== Cast ==
Male cast

- M. G. Ramachandran as Kanagu
- M. G. Chakrapani as Sundara Mudaliar
- K. A. Thangavelu as Duraiyappan
- Gopalakrishnan as John
- O. A. K. Thevar as Balu
- D. Balasubramaniam as Logu Mudaliar
- R. Balasubramaniam as Arumai Nayagam
- Kaka Radhakrishnan as Ezhumalai
- E. R. Sahadevan as Thiruvenkatam
- Azhwar Kuppusami as Kakka Pillai
- Sivanathan as Doctor
- Karikol Raj as Astrologer
- Nagarathnam as Poojari
- T. K. Sampangi as Sheriff
- Shanmugam as Chef

Female cast

- P. Kannamba as Dhanabhagyam
- N. Jamuna as Sundari
- Rajasulochana as Kaveri
- Susheela as Kantha
- Mohana as Meena
- Aranganayaki as Ezhumalai's mother
- Chandrakala as Lady Doctor

== Production ==
The story of Thaai Magalukku Kattiya Thaali was written by C. N. Annadurai, which Rama Arangannal then expanded into a screenplay.

== Soundtrack ==
The music was composed by T. R. Pappa. Lyrics were by Udumalai Narayana Kavi, Kannadasan, A. Maruthakasi, K. D. Santhanam.

Song	Singers	Lyrics	Length
"Aadivarum Aadagap Porpaavai Adi Nee"	Sirkazhi Govindarajan & S. Janaki	K. D. Santhanam	04:42
"Chinnanchiru Vayadhu Mudhal"	T. M. Soundararajan & Jikki		02:59
"Kodumaiyadaa...Vaanampaadi Ondru"	Sirkazhi Govindarajan		03:29
"Nervazhiye Nadanthirundhaal"	T. M. Soundararajan & A. Nithyakala		01:54
"Ondralla Irandalla Thambi"	Sirkazhi Govindarajan	Udumalai Narayana Kavi	03:13
"Parandhu Parandhu Enggum Thiriyum"	Jikki & A. Nithyakala		02:42
"Sengarumbu Chaatrinile Then Kalandhu"	T. M. Soundararajan & A. Nithyakala		5:20
"Thanjavooru Bommaiyai Paarunggadi"	Sirkazhi Govindarajan, L. R. Eswari, T. M. Soundararajan & P. Susheela	Udumalai Narayana Kavi	05:49
"Thogai Inge Megam Ange"	Jikki	Kannadasan	03:29
"Ulladhai Sonna Paitthiyamunnu"	T. M. Soundararajan		03:33
"Vandhen Vandhaname"	Sirkazhi Govindarajan		

== Release and reception ==
Thaai Magalukku Kattiya Thaali was released on 31 December 1959. The film became a box-office bomb, and gained notoriety mainly for its "puzzling" title. Ramachandran accepted criticism the film received, saying, "If a specialist who handles one particular aspect of a movie, becomes a director, he would focus his attention only on his speciality, and ignores other vital aspects. The director of this Thai Magalluku Kattiya Thaali movie, R.R. Chandran, was a specialist cinematographer. His focus was only on camera. As such, he had ignored other vital aspects of the movie".
