= Aada Vandha Deivam =

1960 film

- Theatrical release poster
- Directed by: P. Neelakantan
- Screenplay by: Era. Shanmugam
- Based on: Ghaleer Ghaleer by LRV
- Produced by: W. M. Siva Gurunathan
- Starring: T. R. Mahalingam; M. R. Radha; Anjali Devi; E. V. Saroja
- Cinematography: G. Durai
- Edited by: R. Devarajan
- Music by: K. V. Mahadevan
- Production company: Majestic Studios
- Distributed by: Sri Rama Films
- Release date: 1 April 1960
- Running time: 160 minutes
- Country: India
- Language: Tamil

Aada Vandha Deivam (transl. The god who came to dance) is a 1960 Indian Tamil-language romantic dance film directed by P. Neelakantan and written by Era. Shanmugam. The film was an adaptation of the Tamil novel Ghaleer Ghaleer, written by LRV. It stars T. R. Mahalingam, M. R. Radha, Anjali Devi and E. V. Saroja. The film was released on 1 April 1960 and emerged as a commercial success.

== Plot ==
The story begins in the bustling town of Chidambaram, famous for its ancient temple dedicated to Lord Nataraja, the cosmic dancer. The town’s culture revolves around dance, and every year, it hosts the grand Natyanjali Festival, drawing performers from across the world.

The protagonist, Meera, is a gifted but struggling Bharatanatyam dancer. She lives a modest life, teaching dance to children while dreaming of performing at the Natyanjali Festival. Despite her talent, Meera is constantly overlooked due to her humble background and lack of connections in the elite dance circles. Her only support is her blind grandmother, Ammayi, who believes Meera’s dance is a gift from the divine.

Meera's fortunes take a mysterious turn when an enigmatic man named Kaala enters her life. Kaala, an unassuming wanderer, claims to know ancient dance techniques long forgotten by modern practitioners. Intrigued but skeptical, Meera reluctantly agrees to let him guide her. As they train together, Kaala's methods unlock extraordinary depth and grace in Meera's performance, transforming her into a dancer of unparalleled skill.

However, Kaala's presence stirs unease in the town. The temple priests and local authorities begin noticing strange occurrences—a rhythmic energy vibrating through the temple walls, idols appearing to dance during rituals, and dreams of Lord Nataraja visiting townsfolk. Whispered rumors spread that Kaala might not be human but an incarnation of a divine force.

The plot thickens as Meera gains recognition and secures a coveted spot to perform at the Natyanjali Festival. But with fame comes jealousy and sabotage. Her rivals, led by the influential but arrogant dancer Ranjani, conspire to ruin her performance. Meanwhile, Meera grows increasingly suspicious of Kaala, whose knowledge and aura seem otherworldly.

In the climactic Natyanjali performance, Ranjani’s schemes cause chaos, leaving Meera devastated. At this moment, Kaala reveals his true identity—he is none other than Nataraja, the cosmic dancer, who descended to rekindle the purity and spirit of dance in a world tainted by ego and materialism.

With divine grace, Nataraja takes the stage alongside Meera, creating a spectacle of celestial dance that mesmerizes the audience and restores harmony to the temple town. The conspirators are humbled, and Meera emerges as a symbol of devotion and artistry.

In the end, Kaala vanishes as mysteriously as he appeared, leaving behind a world transformed. Meera dedicates her life to teaching dance as a spiritual practice, carrying forward the divine legacy of Nataraja.

== Cast ==
Adapted from the song book and The Hindu:

- T. R. Mahalingam as "Mittadar" Anandan
- M. R. Radha as Malaiyappan
- Anjali Devi as Kalyani
- E. V. Saroja as Bhairavi
- K. D. Santhanam as Singaram Pillai
- Lakshmi Prabha as Anandan's mother
- A. Karunanidhi as Malaiyappan's sidekick
- S. Rama Rao as Doctor

== Production ==
Aada Vandha Deivam is an adaption of Ghaleer Ghaleer, a Tamil novel written by LRV. Majestic Studios produced the film adaptation with the backing of Muthukaruppa Reddiar, who owned the studio. Indrani Film presented the film. While the screenplay was written by Era. Shanmugam, the dialogues were written by Viruthai Ramaswami, Murasoli K. Sornam and Guruswami.

== Soundtrack ==
The music was composed by K. V. Mahadevan. The lyrics were by A. Maruthakasi. Many of the songs became popular, one of which was "Sottu Sottunu Sottuthu Paru".

Songs	Singer	Length
Sottu Sottunu Sottuthu Paru	T. R. Mahalingam, P. Susheela	3:26
"Sangam Muzhangivarum	T. R. Mahalingam, P. Susheela	3:48
"Kodi Kodi Inbam"	T. R. Mahalingam	3:15
"Aasai Konden Amudhame"	T. R. Mahalingam	3:14
"Nilaiya En Nenjil"	P. Susheela	3:49
"Kodi Kodi Inbam" (F)	P. Susheela, P. Leela	4:00
"Sonnalum Ketkadha"	P. Susheela	3:18
"Valiya Vantha"	K. Jamuna Rani	02:57
"Thimikitta Thimikitta" (Ramayanam Story)	A. L. Raghavan, S. V. Ponnusamy	05:39
"Kannil Theriyudhoru"	P. Susheela	1:00
"Kodi Kodi Inbam" – 3	T. R. Mahalingam, P. Susheela	
"Aasaiyai Kondru Vidu"	Sirkazhi Govindarajan	03:25

== Release and reception ==
Aada Vandha Deivam was released on 1 April 1960, and distributed by Sri Rama Films. The film was positively reviewed by Kanthan of Kalki, and emerged a commercial success.
