= Mayavathi =

- Theatrical release poster
- Directed by: T. R. Sundaram
- Written by: P. Kannan
- Produced by: T. R. Sundaram
- Starring: T. R. Mahalingam; Anjali Devi
- Music by: G. Ramanathan
- Production company: Ganapathy Pictures
- Distributed by: Modern Theatres
- Release date: 12 August 1949
- Running time: 2 hrs. 24 mins. (12997 ft.)
- Country: India
- Language: Tamil

Mayavathi is a 1949 Indian Tamil-language film produced and directed by T. R. Sundaram. The film stars T. R. Mahalingam and Anjali Devi.

== Plot ==
A princess falls in love with a prince who hates women. Another person, a barber, is also interested in the princess. He uses several tricks to get her but fails every time. How the princess succeeds in winning over the prince forms the crux of the story.

== Cast ==
The list is adapted from a review article published in The Hindu newspaper.

Male cast

- T. R. Mahalingam as Surangathan
- S. V. Subbaiah
- Kali N. Rathnam
- M. G. Chakrapani
- K. K. Perumal
- M. E. Madhavan
- A. Karunanidhi
- Narayana Pillai

Female cast

- Anjali Devi as Mayavathi
- C. T. Rajakantham

Dance

- Lalitha
- Padmini

== Production ==
The story is based on a folk tale and the film was produced at Modern Theatres that was located on the outskirts of Salem. The dances by Lalitha and Padmini were choreographed by K. K. Sinha.

== Soundtrack ==
Music was composed by G. Ramanathan while the lyrics were penned by A. Maruthakasi and Ka. Mu. Sheriff. Singer is T. R. Mahalingam. Playback singer is M. L. Vasanthakumari.

Pennenum Maaya Peyaam Poi Maadharai is the first film song penned by A. Maruthakasi.

No.	Song	Singer	Lyrics	Length (m:ss)
1	"Pennenum Maaya Peyaam Poi Maadharai"	T. R. Mahalingam	A. Maruthakasi	03:44
2	"Maane En Prema Raani"	T. R. Mahalingam & M. L. Vasanthakumari		03:17
3	"Vaaraai En Inba Vaazhve"	M. L. Vasanthakumari		02:02
4	"Aahaa Thanimai Tharum Invbam"	M. L. Vasanthakumari		02:47
5	"Manamohiniye Unnai Maravene"	T. R. Mahalingam		02:55
6	"Sadhaa Un Haasyamevum"	T. R. Mahalingam		02:25
7	"Alli Malaraayirundhen"	M. L. Vasanthakumari	A. Maruthakasi	02:45
8	"Varuvano Madhivadhanan"	M. L. Vasanthakumari		02:11
9	"Jeyame En Vaazhvile"	M. L. Vasanthakumari		01:30

== Reception ==
According to Randor Guy, this movie was a flop s at the box-office. This was supported in M. Karunanidhi's autobiography. Karunanidhi had written that to recover from this flop in 1949, mogul T.R. Sundaram decided to make "Manthiri Kumari" movie in a grand style and succeeded well in 1950."Mayavathi", nevertheless is "remembered for: Lalitha-Padmini’s dances, and the daring romantic scenes between the lead pair."
