= Kannan Karunai =

1971 film by N. T. Rama Rao

- Poster
- Directed by: N. T. Rama Rao
- Written by: A. K. Velan (dialogues)
- Produced by: N. Trivikrama Rao
- Starring: N. T. Rama Rao; K. R. Vijaya
- Music by: S. V. Venkatraman
- Production company: NAD
- Release date: 16 June 1971
- Country: India
- Language: Tamil

Kannan Karunai (transl. Kannan's grace) is a 1971 Indian Tamil-language Hindu mythological film directed by N. T. Rama Rao. He also stars, alongside K. R. Vijaya. The film was released on 16 June 1971.

== Cast ==
- N. T. Rama Rao
- T. R. Mahalingam
- Manohar
- Ramadas
- O. A. K. Thevar
- Udhaya Kumar
- V. Nagayya
- K. R. Vijaya
- S. Varalakshmi
- Rathna
- Geethanjali

== Production ==
Kannan Karunai was directed by N. T. Rama Rao. The dialogues were written by A. K. Velan. The film was also produced in Telugu as Rajasooyam.

== Soundtrack ==
The soundtrack was composed by S. V. Venkatraman, with lyrics written by Papanasam Sivan and Udumalai Narayana Kavi.

Song	Singers	Length
"Kannal Mozhi Maane"	T. M. Soundararajan & P. Susheela	03:21
"Inbavalli Vaazh Vidharba"	T. M. Soundararajan & T. R. Mahalingam	02:54
"Kadal Nirak Kannanadi"	Jikki & L. R. Eswari	03:53
"Thamarai Idhazh Kannan"	T. R. Mahalingam & P. Susheela	03:21
"Bale Bale Vandi"	T. M. Soundararajan	04:24
