= Chinna Durai (1952 film) =

- Theatrical release poster
- Directed by: T. R. Mahalingam
- Screenplay by: K. D. Santhanam
- Based on: Irumana Mohinigal by Vaduvur Duraisami Iyengar
- Produced by: T. R. Mahalingam
- Starring: T. R. Mahalingam; S. Varalakshmi; G. Sakunthala; B. R. Panthulu
- Cinematography: Bahadur
- Edited by: Devan
- Music by: T. G. Lingappa
- Production company: Sri Sukumar Productions
- Distributed by: MS Pictures
- Release date: 22 August 1952
- Country: India
- Language: Tamil

Chinna Durai is a 1952 Indian Tamil-language romantic thriller film, directed and produced by T. R. Mahalingam, and written by K. D. Santhanam. The film stars Mahalingam, S. Varalakshmi and G. Sakunthala, with V. K. Ramasamy and Chandrababu in supporting roles. It is based on the novel Irumana Mohinigal, by Vaduvoor Duraisamy Ayyengar. The film was released on 22 August 1952 and failed at the box office.

== Cast ==
- T. R. Mahalingam as Raja Bahadur and Chinna Durai
- S. Varalakshmi as Indramani
- G. Sakunthala as Chandramani
- V. K. Ramasamy as Raja Sri Krishnan
- Chandrababu as the secretary

== Production ==
Chinna Durai is based on the novel Irumana Mohinigal, by Vaduvoor Duraisamy Ayyengar. T. R. Mahalingam, in addition to directing and producing the film, also played dual roles in it.

== Soundtrack ==
The music was composed by T. G. Lingappa and the lyrics were penned by K. D. Santhanam.

Songs	Singer	Length
"Nilave Neethan Oru"	T. R. Mahalingam	02:25
"Poda Raja Podinadayaley"	J. P. Chandra Babu	02:56
"O Raagini Vaa Raagini"	T. G. Lingappa & K. Rani	03:01
"Thiraiye Nee Thoodhu Chellayao"	T. R. Mahalingam	02:22
"Jegam Yaavum Kaadhal Mayame"	T. R. Mahalingam & A. G. Rathnamala	02:22
"Aaaraadha Sogam"	S. Varalakshmi	03:11

== Release and reception ==
Chinna Durai was released on 22 August 2022, and distributed by MS Pictures. According to historian Randor Guy, the film failed commercially due to Mahalingam's poor directorial skills.
