= Thirumalai Deivam =

- Poster
- Directed by: A. P. Nagarajan
- Written by: A. P. Nagarajan
- Starring: Gemini Ganesan; K. B. Sundarambal; R. Muthuraman; A. V. M. Rajan; Sivakumar; Lakshmi; Srividya; S. Varalakshmi; T. R. Mahalingam
- Cinematography: W. R. Subba Rao; Devuru
- Edited by: T. Vijayarangam
- Music by: Kunnakudi Vaidyanathan
- Production company: Shanthi Combines
- Release date: 27 July 1973
- Running time: 154 minutes
- Country: India
- Language: Tamil

Thirumalai Deivam is a 1973 Indian Tamil-language Hindu mythological film, directed and written by A. P. Nagarajan. The film stars Sivakumar in the title role, with K. B. Sundarambal, T. R. Mahalingam, Srividya, Lakshmi and A. V. M. Rajan in supporting roles.

== Plot ==
Once upon a time, Bhrigu and other saints performed Yajna for the welfare of all living beings. After the completion of Yajna they should offer first respect to one among the Trimurties (Brahma, Vishnu, and Shiva). They were confused, so Narada told him to test all three. When he reached Satya Loka, Brahma and Saraswathi were enjoying music played by Saraswathi so they didn't see and welcome Bhrigu. He was insulted and cursed them, so that they will not have any temple in earth. When he reached Kailasam, he saw Shiva and Parvati dancing, so they too didn't see and welcome Bhrigu. He cursed Shiva to be prayed to only in Lingam form and finally reached Vaikuntham. He saw Vishnu sleeping on his serpent Anantha-Shesha. Vishnu knew Bhrigu was waiting but kept his eyes closed. Upon Bhrigu seeing this, he became angry and kicked his chest, making Vishnu open his eyes. Then he said that don't be angry with me Bhrigu rishi and he served him with utmost devotion, so Bhrigu decide to offer first respect to him. After Bhrigu left, Lakshmi left Vishnu as Bhrigu kicked Vishnu's chest where she resided.

After that, Vishnu lost all his wealth and left Vaikutham. He roamed Earth in the name of Srinivasan. He stayed in an ashram which was taken care by a woman called Yashoda, Krishna's adopted mother in a previous birth. Later, he falls in love with a princess named Padmavati (reincarnated as Lakshmi). They both agree to marry. Srinivasan took a loan from Kubera for the wedding expenses from the idea told by Narada. Srinivasan promised Kubera to pay only interest until the end of Kali Yuga and will then pay the original amount. After the marriage of Srinivasan and Padmavathi, they decide to stay on Earth till Kali Yuga ends to protect the people and became Gods. They are located at Tirupathi. After some years, many kings constructed a temple for him and so many people offered their service and devotion to him. In return he helped all the people when they ask for help. People till now believe that Srinivasan along with Padmavathi Amman will protect mankind with whatever good wish they ask.

        Om Namo Narayanaya

== Cast ==
Actors

- Sivakumar as Lord Vishnu / Srinivasan
- Gemini Ganesan as Agasa Rajan
- R. Muthuraman as King Tondaiman
- A. V. M. Rajan as Narathan
- S. V. Ramadoss as Birugu Munivar
- T. R. Mahalingam as Amudha's Husband
- Suruli Rajan as Rangan, (in Tamil Kuyavan)
- Master Sekhar as Venkatesan
- A. K. Veerasamy as Punniyakodi
- V. Gopalakrishnan
- Ennatha Kannaiya as Anumanthu

Actresses

- K. B. Sundarambal as Saint Narayani
- S. Varalakshmi as Vagula malai
- C. R. Vijayakumari as Amutha
- Srividya as Goddess Lakshmi
- Lakshmi as Goddess Padmavati
- Kumari Padmini as Goddess Parvathy
- Manorama as Ramaayee
- Sachu as Pankajavalli
- Pushpalatha as Queen Anandhavalli
- S. N. Parvathy as Dhankodi
- S. N. Lakshmi as blind boy's mother
- Pushpamala
- Sukumari as Queen
- Acho Chithra as Vellachi

== Soundtrack ==
Music was composed by Kunnakudi Vaidyanathan and lyrics were written by Kannadasan, K. D. Santhanam, Alangudi Somu, Nellai Arulmani, Poovai Senguttuvan, and Ulundhurpettai Shanmugam. The song "Ezhumalai Irukka" is set in the raga Hamsanandi.

Song	Singers	Length
"Maaley Manivannaa Maayavaney"	P. Suseela	03:16
"Neela Nira Megam"	S. Varalakshmi	03:08
"Vasantha Vizhaa"	B. Vasantha	03:14
"Ezhumalai Naanga Vaazhum"	L. R. Eswari	02:52
"Aanantha Nilaiyam ondru"	T. M. Soundararajan	03:30
"Mannai Ellaam Uyirgalaakki"	S. V. Ponnusamy, Sarala	02:37
"Ezhumalai Irukka"	K. B. Sundarambal	02:52
"Thiruvarul Tharum Deivam"	T. R. Mahalingam	03:16
"Varum Naal Ellaam"	K. B. Sundarambal	03:57

== Reception ==
Navamani praised acting, dialogues, music, cinematography and direction.
