= Vilayattu Bommai =

- Poster
- Directed by: T. R. Raghunath
- Written by: A. L. Narayanan
- Produced by: T. R. Mahalingam
- Starring: T. R. Mahalingam; Kumari Kamala
- Cinematography: R. Sampath
- Edited by: R. Devarajan
- Music by: T. G. Lingappa
- Production company: Sri Sukumar Productions
- Distributed by: Famous Films
- Release date: 14 May 1954
- Country: India
- Language: Tamil

Vilaiyattu Bommai (transl. Playing toy) is a 1954 Indian Tamil language film directed by T. R. Raghunath. The film stars T. R. Mahalingam and Kumari Kamala.

== Cast ==
The following list was compiled from Film News Anandan's database.

- T. R. Mahalingam
- Kumari Kamala
- K. Sarangapani
- B. R. Panthulu
- Baby Radha (Kumari Kamala's sister)
- V. K. Ramasamy
- E. V. Saroja
- K. A. Thangavelu
- Lakshmiprabha

== Production ==
Vilaiyattu Bommai is the fourth film produced by T. R. Mahalingam via the production company Sri Sukumar Productions. It was originally titled Vilaiyattu Pillai.

== Soundtrack ==
Music was composed by T. G. Lingappa.

Song	Singer/s	Lyricist	Length
"Mohathai Konruvidu"	T. R. Mahalingam	Subramania Bharati	
"Theertha Karaiyinile"	T. R. Mahalingam	Subramania Bharati	03:09
"Vidhikku Manidhane"	T. R. Mahalingam	Thanjai N. Ramaiah Dass	03:21
"Maliyeri Maavilakku Poduvaar"	A. P. Komala	Thanjai N. Ramaiah Dass	
"Kalai Chelvame Vaazhgave"	Soolamangalam Rajalakshmi	Thanjai N. Ramaiah Dass	
"Kannil Prasannamaana Kaliye"	Soolamangalam Rajalakshmi	Thanjai N. Ramaiah Dass	
"Inba Vaanil Ulaavum"	T. R. Mahalingam & Soolamangalam Rajalakshmi	Thanjai N. Ramaiah Dass	
"Kannalagi Ennaipol Yaarundu"	Jikki	K. P. Kamatchisundaram	
"Periyorgal Sollai Pola"	Soolamangalam Rajalakshmi	K. P. Kamatchisundaram	
"Mullaimalar Kodiyin Nizhalile"	T. R. Mahalingam	K. P. Kamatchisundaram	

== Reception ==
The Indian Express gave the film a favourable review for the performances of Mahalingam and Kamala, as well as the comedy of Sarangapani and Thangavelu. Despite this, it was a box office failure.
