= Velaikaran (1952 film) =

- Poster
- Directed by: P. V. Krishnan
- Written by: Sakthi Krishnasamy (Dialogues)
- Story by: Ku. Ma. Balasubramaniam
- Starring: T. R. Mahalingam; T. S. Balaiah; Madhuridevi
- Music by: R. Sudarsanam
- Production company: Sri Valli Productions
- Release date: 23 May 1952
- Running time: 171 minutes
- Country: India
- Language: Tamil

Velaikaran (transl. The manservant) is a 1952 Indian Tamil-language film directed by P. V. Krishnan and produced by Sri Valli Productions. The film stars T. R. Mahalingam, S. Varalakshmi and Madhuridevi. It was released on 23 May 1952, and became a box office failure.

== Cast ==
The list is adapted from the book Thiraikalanjiyam.

- T. R. Mahalingam
- T. S. Balaiah
- S. V. Subbaiah
- Madhuri Devi
- S. Varalakshmi
- M. S. Draupathi

== Soundtrack ==
The music was composed by R. Sudarsanam.

Song	Singer/s	Lyricist	Duration (m:ss)
"Paadupadupavarke"	C. S. Jayaraman & group	Kavimani Desigavinayagam Pillai	03:06
"Paavathai Seydhavan Yaaro"		Ku. Ma. Balasubramaniam	
"Aasai Niraasai Thaano"		Ku. Ma. Balasubramaniam	
"Maane Marikozhundhe"	T. S. Bhagavathi, M. S. Rajeswari, A. G. Rathnamala & Soolamangalam Rajalakshmi	Ku. Ma. Balasubramaniam	06:32
"Aanandame Aahaa Aanandame"	M. S. Rajeswari	Ku. Ma. Balasubramaniam	02:20
"Arangkinil Aadavum Paadavum"		Ku. Ma. Balasubramaniam	
"Enadhullam Neeyarindhe"	T. R. Mahalingam	Papanasam Sivan	03:09
"Kaadhalum Poi Aagume"	T. R. Mahalingam & S. Varalakshmi	K. D. Santhanam	
"Naane Raani En Maname"	S. Varalakshmi	K. P. Kamatchisundaram	02:56
"Ezhil Vaan Mugam Thannaiye"	S. Varalakshmi	K. P. Kamatchisundaram	
"Idhaya Veenaiyin Narambai Meetiye"	M. S. Rajeswari	K. P. Kamatchisundaram	02:57
"Manidhaa Nee Seidha Vinaithaane"	C. S. Jayaraman	K. P. Kamatchisundaram	
