= Tirunilakanta Nayanar =

Nayanar, Hindu saint

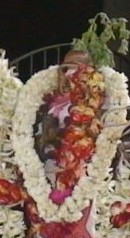

Personal life
- Born: Chidambaram
- Honors: Nayanar saint,

Religious life
- Religion: Hinduism
- Philosophy: Shaivism, Bhakti

Tirunilakanta Nayanar, also known as Tirunilakanta (spelt as Tirunilakantha, Tiru Neelakanta, Tiru Nilakanta), Nilakantan and Tirunilakantar (Thiruneelakandar) was a Nayanar saint, venerated in the Hindu sect of Shaivism. He is generally counted as the second in the list of 63 Nayanars.

== Life ==
The life of Tirunilakanta Nayanar is described in the Tamil Periya Puranam by Sekkizhar (12th century), which is a hagiography of the 63 Nayanars.

Tirunilakanta Nayanar belonged to Chidambaram, famous for its Thillai Nataraja Temple dedicated to the god Shiva, patron of Shaivism. He was born in the Kuyavar caste of potters. He made earthenware pots and other containers. He was a devout devotee of Shiva and distributed clay bowls to devotees of Shiva, free of cost. He and his wife specially revered the Nilakanta (Tirunilakanta, "Blue Throated one") form of Shiva, who drank the Halahala poison and saved the universe.

Once, Tirunilakanta Nayanar enjoyed pleasure with a prostitute. The news reached the wife before he reached home. The enraged wife fulfilled all her duties but did not allow her husband to touch her. When he tried affectionately touch her to placate her, she refused his advances and said 'Would you touch us (me) .... Tirunilakanta.' While the wife meant that her husband does not touch her, she used a pronoun, which also meant "us". Tirunilakanta could be interpreted as the name of the husband or god Shiva. Traditionally, a Hindu married woman does not address her husband by his name. It is not clear by what she meant, but her husband took the meaning that she refrained him from touching all women ("us") by the name of the god Nilakanta. The Nayanar pledged not to touch any woman from that day, even in his thoughts.

While the wife carried out all the responsibilities of a wife to Tirunilakanta Nayanar, they never touched each other. They lived in different quarters in the house and fulfilled Tirunilakanta's vow in secret. The couple became old.

Once, Shiva disguised himself as a Shaiva yogi (mendicant). He was welcomed and worshipped by Tirunilakanta Nayanar. Upon inquiry by the aged potter about what he can do for the ascetic, the ascetic gave him his "precious" earthen begging bowl and told the potter to keep it safe till he returns. The yogi left; Tirunilakanta kept the bowl in a safe location.

After a long time, the yogi returned and demanded his begging bowl. Tirunilakanta looked for the bowl in the place he kept it and then searched the whole house in vain. Shiva had actually made the begging bowl disappear. The worried Nayanar prostrated before the mendicant and told him that he had lost the bowl and offered to replace it with a new clay bowl. However, the agitated ascetic refused and accused the potter of stealing his precious bowl. Upon much persuasion, the ascetic ordered Tirunilakanta to take a dip in the temple tank and swear by taking his hand on the head of his son. When the potter told the yogi that he was childless, the ascetic suggested that he do so by swearing on his wife's head. But, Tirunilakanta refused to do so, due to his vow, the incensed left and appealed to the Brahmin priests of the temple for justice.

The Brahmin court heard both sides and ordered the potter to swear his innocence in the holy tank. Tirunilakanta and his wife entered the temple pond, each holding an end of a bamboo stick. The ascetic objected and suggested the potter hold his wife's hand. Ultimately, the potter revealed the whole story - which was concealed from the world till then - about his private life and his vow to the assembled Brahmins and the ascetic. The old couple immersed themselves in the holy waters and emerged as a young couple as they rose up. The awestruck Brahmins looked in disbelief. The ascetic disappeared. In the sky, Shiva appeared with his consort Parvati and blessed the couple. Pleased by the couple's devotion and sexual restraint, Shiva took them to his abode Kailash, where they are said to have lived ever young.

== Remembrance ==
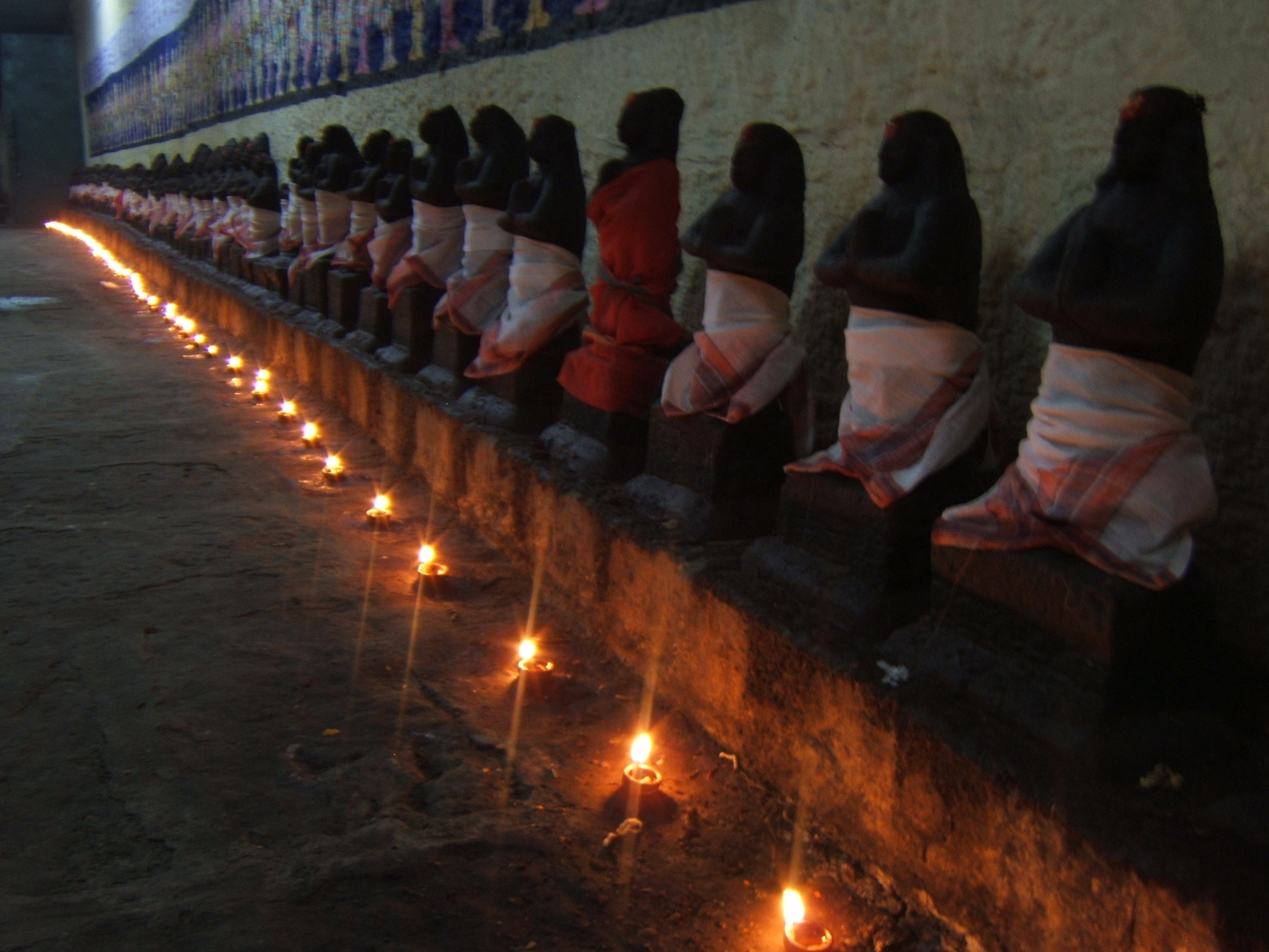
The images of the Nayanars are found in many Shiva temples in Tamil Nadu.

One of the most prominent Nayanars, Sundarar (8th century) venerates Tirunilakanta Nayanar in the Tiruthonda Thogai, a hymn to Nayanar saints, calling him "the blessed potter" and the first Nayanar mentioned in the hymn and the only one whose caste affiliation is stated. While describing the Nayanars, Nambiyandar Nambi (11th century) says that Tirunilakanta Nayanar observed sexual abstinence with his wife and as an aged man, regained his youth with his wife by "God's grace". A maxim by Sivadevayya, also known as Visweswara Siva Desika, the guru and minister of the Kakatiya king Kakati Ganapati Deva (1199-1260), part of his lost Telugu sataka (a collection of 100 poems ) Siva-devadhimani Satakamu says that one must be like Siriyala in childhood, Sundarar in youth and Gundaya (Tirunilakanta Nayanar) in old age; if one has no faith in Shiva then "his birth is burden and life is futile". Gopalakrishna Bharati (1810–1896) wrote a short opera named Tirunilakantha Nayanar Charitram on his life.

Tirunilakanta Nayanar is worshipped in the Tamil month of Thai, when the moon enters the Vishakha nakshatra (lunar mansion). He is depicted with folded hands (see Anjali mudra). He receives collective worship as part of the 63 Nayanars. Their icons and brief accounts of his deeds are found in many Shiva temples in Tamil Nadu. Their images are taken out in procession in festivals.

In Chidambaram, west of the main Nataraja Temple lies the temple tank called Ilamai thirtam (tank of youth) or Ilamai Nayanar thirtam (tank of the young Nayanar) or Vyaghrapada thirtam, which is believed to the site of the test of Tirunilakanta Nayanar by Shiva. The Ilamaiyakinar temple dedicated to Shiva stands on the banks of the tank. The temple is said to be built by the devotee Vyaghrapada, long before Tirunilakanta Nayanar's times and was also as Thiruppuleeswarar. After the Tirunilakanta incident, the form of Shiva was renamed as Ilamai-yakinar. The temple has a shrine for the Tirunilakanta Nayanar and his wife Ratnasalai. The Thai Vishakha day is believed to be the day of Tirunilakanta Nayanar's test of devotion. The day is marked by a temple festival when the tale of the Nayanar's test are ritually enacted in the temple tank. Separated couples or couples with disputes in the marriage are prescribed to pray in the temple for a happy married life.
