= Lalita Venkatram =

Indian singer

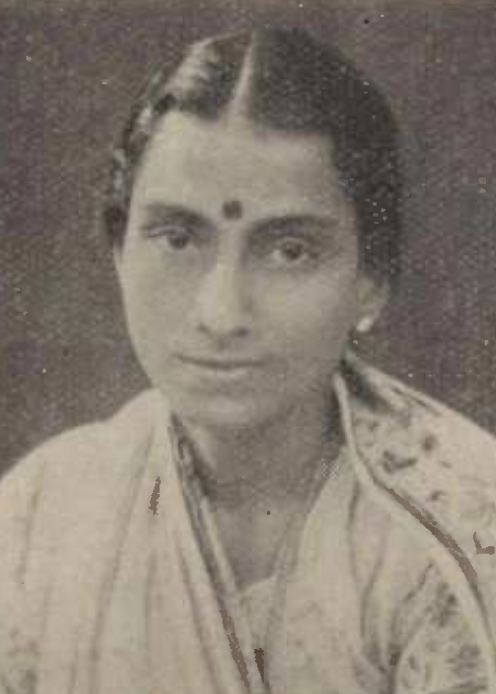
- Lalita Venkatram, from a 1939 issue of The Indian Listener
- Born: 1909; Thiruvannamalai, Tamil Nadu
- Died: 1992 (aged 82–83)
- Other names: Lalita Venkataram, Lalitha Venkataraman
- Occupations: Singer, music educator

Lalita Venkatram (1909 – 1992), also credited as Lalita Venkataram or Lalitha Venkataraman, was an Indian Carnatic singer and veena player. She is credited as the first playback singer in Tamil cinema and the first Carnatic musician to be featured on All India Radio, Bombay.

== Early life ==
Venkatram was born in Thiruvannamalai, Tamil Nadu, the daughter of Manavasi V. Ramaswamy Iyer and Subbalakshmi Ramaswami. Her father was a public works engineer and a composer.

== Career ==
Venkatram gave concerts in India and Ceylon, singing and accompanying herself on the veena. She gave a benefit performance in Colombo after the 1935 Quetta earthquake. She was the first Carnatic singer to be heard on All India Radio, Bombay, because she sang on the station's first broadcast in 1933. She provided singing vocals for an actress in A. V. Meiyappan's Nandakumar (1938), becoming the first playback singer in a Tamil film. She continued giving concerts and performing on All India Radio into the late 1940s.

Venkatram taught music students in Bombay after she retired from performing. One of her successful students was singer and composer Shankar Mahadevan.

== Personal life ==
She married K. S. Venkatram. She lived in Bombay and had five children, including singer Kalyani Ramdas. Venkatram died in 1992. One of her grandchildren, Krishna Ramdas, is a professional tabla player.
