= Ku. Ma. Balasubramaniam =

Indian writer and poet

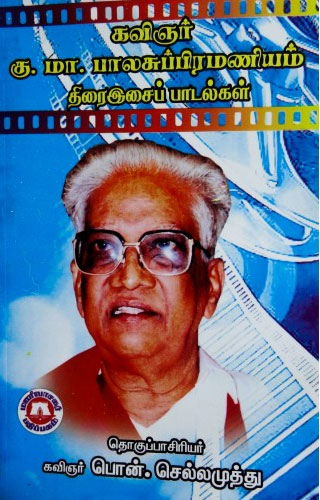
- Born: Kurichi Marimuthu Balasubramaniam; 13 May 1920; Velukkudi, Mannargudi, Tiruvarur district, Tamilnadu
- Died: 4 November 1994 (aged 74)
- Occupations: Poet, writer

Kurichchi Marimuthu Balasubramaniam better known as Ku. Ma. Balasubramaniam (1920–1994) was an Indian writer and poet who wrote mainly in the Tamil language.

== Early life ==
Ku. Ma. Balasubramaniam born on 13 May 1920 at Velukkudi near Mannargudi in Tiruvarur district. His parents are Marimuthu and Govindammal. His father died when he was still a child. Therefore, he could not continue his school studies after 6th standard. However, his mother, who was a literate woman, taught him religious hymns in Tamil. He started writing short stories and poems from the age of 16. His writings were published in popular Tamil magazines and periodicals.

Observing his interest in poetry, the Headmaster of Chennai Chintadripet High School, Thiruvengadam taught him grammar.

== Writer ==
He wrote the screenplay, dialogues and lyrics for Konjum Salangai in 1962 and for Mahakavi Kalidas in 1966. He also wrote dialogues and lyrics for Ponni (1953) and Madadhipathi Magal (1962). He worked as assistant director and wrote lyrics for Or Iravu (1951) and Gomathiyin Kaadhalan (1955). He wrote story and lyrics for Velaikaran (1952)

== Tamil film lyricist ==
He penned his first lyrics for Or Iravu. The song Puvi Mael Maanamudan Uyir Vaazha Vazhiyedhum Illaiye was tuned by R. Sudarsanam.

== Public service ==
He was a member of the Tamil Nadu Legislative Council. He also functioned as the Secretary of the Tamil Nadu State Literary and Music and Drama Society.

== Awards and felicitations ==
- Kalaimamani award by Tamil Nadu State Government on 25.01.1975.
- Kavikuyil award by Erode Tamil Poets Society on 13.05.1975.

== Notable compositions ==
Year	Film	Song/s	Singer/s	Music director	Notes
1951	Or Iravu	Puvi Mael Maanamudan	T. S. Bhagavathi	R. Sudarsanam	The very first film lyrics he penned
1952	Velaikaran	Aanandame Aaha Aanandame	M. S. Rajeswari	R. Sudarsanam	5 out of 12 songs were penned by him
1953	Inspector	Moodiyirundha En Vizhiyinul	M. L. Vasanthakumari	G. Ramanathan	
1953	Ponni			S. M. Subbaiah Naidu	
1953	Sathya Sodhanai	Vaazhvenum Perungkadalile	T. S. Bhagavathi	R. Sudarsanam	Dubbed from Kannada
1953	Sathya Sodhanai	Puyal Veesi Oyndha Vaazhvile		R. Sudarsanam	Dubbed from Kannada
1954	Ratha Paasam			M. K. Athmanathan; A. V. Natarajan	
1955	Chella Pillai	Madhana Ezhil Raajaa	Jikki	R. Sudarsanam	
1955	Naasthigan	Maanilam Mel Sila Manideral	Tiruchi Loganathan	C. Ramachandra	Dubbed from Hindi
1955	Gomathiyin Kaadhalan	Pudumai Nilaa Ange	A. M. Rajah	G. Ramanathan	
1955	Gomathiyin Kaadhalan	Kaaviyak Kaadhal Vaazhvin	A. M. Rajah & Jikki	G. Ramanathan	
1955	Gomathiyin Kaadhalan	Varavendaamenru Solladi	A. P. Komala	G. Ramanathan	
1955	Gomathiyin Kaadhalan	Anbe Yen Aaramudhe Vaaraayi	Sirkazhi Govindarajan & Jikki	G. Ramanathan	This song type is called "Uvamaiyani" (decorated with similes)
1955	Gomathiyin Kaadhalan	Theeraadha Yematrama		G. Ramanathan	short song
1955	Gomathiyin Kaadhalan	Vaanameethil Neendhiyodum	Sirkazhi Govindarajan	G. Ramanathan	
1955	Kadhal Parisu	Nila Vaanile Jaalamaayi	Lakshmi Shankar	Hemant Kumar	Dubbed from Hindi film Samrat
1955	Kadhal Parisu	Nila Vaanile Megamaayi (Pathos)	Lakshmi Shankar	Hemant Kumar	Dubbed from Hindi film Samrat
1955	Kadhal Parisu	Inba Kannalan Unnai Naan	Lakshmi Shankar	Hemant Kumar	Dubbed from Hindi film Samrat
1955	Kadhal Parisu	Pudhumai Nal Aandinile	Lakshmi Shankar	Hemant Kumar	Dubbed from Hindi film Samrat
1955	Kadhal Parisu	Ullaasamaayi Ellorume	Lakshmi Shankar	Hemant Kumar	Dubbed from Hindi film Samrat
1955	Kadhal Parisu	Anbe Ulagil Virodhamaayi	Lakshmi Shankar	Hemant Kumar	Dubbed from Hindi film Samrat
1955	Kanavaney Kankanda Deivam	Unnai Kann Thedudhe	P. Susheela	A. Rama Rao, Hemant Kumar	
1956	Edhu Nijam	Edhu Nijam	Sirkazhi Govindarajan & group	Master Venu	All 6 songs were penned by him
1956	Sivasakthi			T. G. Lingappa	Dubbed from Kannada. All 8 songs were penned by him
1957	Ambikapathy	Maasila Nilave Nam Kaadhalai	T. M. Soundararajan & P. Bhanumathi	G. Ramanathan	
1957	Chakravarthi Thirumagal	Kaadhalenum Solaiyile Radhe	Sirkazhi Govindarajan	G. Ramanathan	
1957	Chakravarthi Thirumagal	Aada Vaanga Annathe	Sirkazhi Govindarajan, Jikki & P. Leela	G. Ramanathan	
1957	Chakravarthi Thirumagal	Kannalane Vaarunga	Jikki & group	G. Ramanathan	
1957	Chakravarthi Thirumagal	Ellaiyillaadha Inbathile	Sirkazhi Govindarajan & P. Leela	G. Ramanathan	
1957	Chakravarthi Thirumagal	Sri Raman Meedhile .. Endhan Ullam Kollai Kolla	M. L. Vasanthakumari	G. Ramanathan	
1957	Pakka Thirudan	Maadhava Maasila Ghaana Lola	P. Leela	T. M. Ibrahim	
1957	Pakka Thirudan	Vannak Kuyil Naane	Jikki	T. M. Ibrahim	
1957	Thangamalai Ragasiyam	Amudhai Pozhiyum Nilave	P. Susheela	T. G. Lingappa	13 of the total 14 songs were penned by him.
1958	Annaiyin Aanai	Kanavin Maya Logathile	T. M. Soundararajan & P. Susheela	S. M. Subbaiah Naidu	
1958	Avan Amaran	Vaan Madhi Nee Arivaayi	Sirkazhi Govindarajan & Jikki	T. M. Ibrahim	
1958	Avan Amaran	Kanmaniye Innamudhe	Jikki	T. M. Ibrahim	
1958	Boologa Rambai	Thaenee Pole Thaedi Vaa	Jikki	C. N. Pandurangan	
1958	Engal Kudumbam Perisu	Ennaalum Kaanaadha Aanandame	Soolamangalam Rajalakshmi	T. G. Lingappa	
1958	Illarame Nallaram	Enai Aala Vandha Raja	Jikki	K. G. Moorthi	
1958	Illarame Nallaram	Ninaikkum Podhe Aaha	A. M. Rajah & Jikki	K. G. Moorthi	
1958	Sabaash Meena			T. G. Lingappa	All 10 songs were penned by him
1958	Uthama Puthiran	Yaaradi Nee Mohini	T. M. Soundararajan, Jikki, K. Jamuna Rani & A. P. Komala	G. Ramanathan	
1958	Uthama Puthiran	Mannulagellam Ponnulagaaga	Jikki& P. Susheela	G. Ramanathan	
1958	Engal Kudumbam Perisu	Ennaalum Kaanaadha Aanandhame	Soolamangalam Rajalakshmi	T. G. Lingappa	
1958	Sabaash Meena	Chithiram Pesuthadi	T. M. Soundararajan	T. G. Lingappa	All 10 songs were penned by him
1959	Kalyanikku Kalyanam	Nee Anji Nadungkathe doi	A. G. Rathnamala & A. P. Komala	G. Ramanathan	
1959	Maragadham	Kunguma Poove Konjum Purave	J. P. Chandrababu & K. Jamuna Rani	S. M. Subbaiah Naidu	
1959	Nalla Theerpu	Azhagaana Maaran Yaradi	P. Leela	S. M. Subbaiah Naidu	3 out of 8 songs were penned by him
1959	President Panchatcharam	Chinna Ponnu Sirikudhu	A. P. Komala & A. G. Rathnamala	G. Ramanathan	3 out of 9 songs were penned by him
1959	Pudhumai Penn	Maaraadha Kaadhalaale	T. M. Soundararajan & P. Susheela	T. G. Lingappa	2 out of 9 songs were penned by him
1959	Sabash Ramu	Kalai Ezhil Veesiye	A. M. Rajah & P. Susheela	Ghantasala	
1959	Veerapandiya Kattabomman			G. Ramanathan	All 11 songs were penned by him.
1959	Yaanai Valartha Vanambadi	Kanne Vanna Pasungkiliye	Sirkazhi Govindarajan	Br Lakshmanan	2 out of 7 songs were penned by him
1960	Chavukkadi Chandrakantha			G. Ramanathan	He is one among other lyricists. Individual credits not known.
1960	Ellorum Innaattu Mannar	Vetri Petra Maamanukku	P. Susheela & K. Rani	T. G. Lingappa	
1960	Kadavulin Kuzhandhai	Chinna Chinna Poove	P. B. Srinivas & P. Susheela	G. Ramanathan	2 out of 8 songs penned by him
1960	Kalathur Kannamma	Aadaatha Manamum Aaduthe	A. M. Rajah & P. Susheela	R. Sudarsanam	
1960	Kuzhandhaigal Kanda Kudiyarasu			T. G. Lingappa	All 10 songs were penned by him
1960	Petraval Kanda Peruvazhvu	Anbe Vaadaa	P. Leela	Br. Lakshmanan	3 out of 11 songs were penned by him
1960	Sangili Devan	Kaadhal Ullam Kavarndha	T. M. Soundararajan & P. Susheela	T. G. Lingappa	
1960	Vidivelli	Kaaru, Savaari Joru	Thiruchi Loganathan & Jikki	A. M. Rajah	
1961	Arasilangkumari	Thaaraa, Avar Varuvaaraa	S. Janaki	G. Ramanathan	
1961	Ennai Paar	Kaadhal Enbadhu Kathai Thaano	K. Jamuna Rani	T. G. Lingappa	
1961	Kaanal Neer	Anbaana Enname Paavamaa	P. Bhanumathi	Master Venu	
1961	Kaanal Neer	O Matha Jegan Matha .. Arul Vizhi Paaraai Daevi	P. Susheela	Master Venu	
1961	Kaanal Neer	Manamenum Maaligai Meedhu	P. B. Srinivas, K. Jamuna Rani	Master Venu	
1961	Thirudathe	Mama Mama Makku Mama	P. Suseela & A. L. Raghavan	S. M. Subbaiah Naidu	
1961	Thirudathe	O Mister Balu	Jikki	S. M. Subbaiah Naidu	
1962	Deivathin Deivam	En Aaruyire	P. B. Srinivas & S. Janaki	G. Ramanathan	
1962	Konjum Salangai	Bramman Thaalam Poda	Soolamangalam Rajalakshmi & (Radha) Jayalakshmi	S. M. Subbaiah Naidu	
1962	Konjum Salangai	Singaara Velane Deva	S. Janaki	S. M. Subbaiah Naidu	
1962	Konjum Salangai	Vael Edupome Vetri Vil Thodupome	S. C. Krishnan & Group	S. M. Subbaiah Naidu	
1962	Konjum Salangai	Kaadhal Geetham Ketkumaa	T. M. Soundararajan	S. M. Subbaiah Naidu	
1962	Konjum Salangai	Naadaanda Uthamarai Nanmai Pala Seythavarai	T. M. Soundararajan & Group	S. M. Subbaiah Naidu	
1962	Madathipadhi Magal	Maanilamel Sila Maanidaral	Thiruchi Loganathan	C. Ramachandra, Hemant Kumar	All 7 songs penned by him
1962	Pattinathar	Thanga Bommai Polennai	Soolamangalam Rajalakshmi	G. Ramanathan	
1963	Chittoor Rani Padmini	Oho Nila Raani	Sirkazhi Govindarajan	G. Ramanathan	
1963	Chittoor Rani Padmini	Aadal Paadal Kaanum Podhe	S. Janaki	G. Ramanathan	
1963	Naanum Oru Penn	Yemarach chonnadhu Naano	T. M. Soundararajan	R. Sudarsanam	
1963	Naanum Oru Penn	Yemarach chonnadhu Naano	P. Susheela	R. Sudarsanam	
1964	Chitrangi	Indru Vandha Sondhama	T. M. Soundararajan & P. Susheela	Vedha	
1964	Chitrangi	Velodu Vilaiyaadum Murugaiah	P. Susheela	Vedha	
1964	Chitrangi	Nenjinile Ninaivu Mugam	T. M. Soundararajan, P. Susheela & K. Jamunarani	Vedha	
1966	Mahakavi Kalidas	Malarum Vaan Nilavum	T. M. Soundararajan	K. V. Mahadevan	9 out of 14 songs were penned by him
1967	Bhakta Prahlada	Devi Devi Thaaye	S. Janaki	S. Rajeswara Rao, Rajagopal, Krishnan	
1967	Bhakta Prahlada	Hey Jothi Swaroopa	P. Susheela & S. Janaki	S. Rajeswara Rao, Rajagopal, Krishnan	
1980	Doorathu Idi Muzhakkam	Ullamellaam Thallaaduthe	K. J. Yesudas & S. Janaki	Salil Chowdhury	
1980	Doorathu Idi Muzhakkam	Sevvallip Poove	S. Janaki & group	Salil Chowdhury	
1980	Doorathu Idi Muzhakkam	Jalasa Ho Ho Haiya	S. P. Balasubrahmanyam & group	Salil Chowdhury	
1980	Doorathu Idi Muzhakkam	Mani Vilakkaal Ammaa	K. J. Jesuthas	Salil Chowdhury	
1982	Kanavugal Karpanaigal	Vellam Pole Thullum Ullangale	S. P. Balasubramaniyam	Gangai Amaran	

== Bibliography ==
- "Tamil film lyricists - 16: Ku. Ma. Balasubramaniam" (in Tamil). magzter.com.
- G. Neelamegam. Thiraikalanjiyam — Part 1 (in Tamil). Manivasagar Publishers, Chennai 108 (Ph:044 25361039). First edition December 2014.
- G. Neelamegam. Thiraikalanjiyam — Part 2 (in Tamil). Manivasagar Publishers, Chennai 108 (Ph:044 25361039). First edition December 2014.
