= O. A. K. Thevar =

Indian actor (1924–1973)

- Born: Othapatti Ayya Karuppu Thevar c. 1924; Othapatti, Usilampatti, Madurai
- Died: c. 1973 (age 49)
- Occupation: Actor
- Years active: 1950-1973
- Spouse: Chellam
- Children: O. A. K. Sundar

O. A. K. Thevar (c. 1924 – c. 1973) was an Indian actor. He acted in over 200 films and stage plays. He is known for his antagonistic roles. In 1955 he acted in his debut movie Maman Magal. His notable movies are Mahadhevi, Thaikkupin Tharam, Uthama Puthiran, Veerapandiya Kattabomman, and Karnan.

== Early life ==
Thevar went to the drama of Shakti Drama Sabha's camp in Trichy. In the Shakti Drama Sabha, the later screen stars were Sivaji Ganesan, M.N. Nambiar, S.V. Subbaiah and many others. Poet Pattukottai Kalyanasundaram, who played the royal roles in a poet's dream drama. He became a close friend of Thevar. After he met N.S. Krishnan, who was known for his ability to applaud the talented and give away everything at hand, was the famous editor RS. Mani Maman Magal (1955) was produced and directed by Mani gave a role to Thevar. Through the role of Veerasamy, the film was identified with Thevar.

== Personal life ==
His son O. A. K. Sundar is also an actor who also mostly portrays antagonistic roles.

== Filmography ==
- This list is incomplete; you can help by expanding it.

=== 1950s ===
Year	Film	Role	Notes
1950	Thigambara Samiar	Duraisamy	Uncredited role
1951	Sarvadhikari		Uncredited role
1952	Shyamala		Uncredited role
1952	Zamindar		Uncredited role
1954	Sugam Enge	Public prosecutor	Uncredited role
1954	Maheswari		Uncredited role
1955	Maaman Magal	Veerasamy	Debut
1955	Pennarasi		
1956	Alibabavum 40 Thirudargalum	Hameed	
1956	Thanthaikku Pin Thamaiyan	Kathirvelu Pillai	
1956	Madurai Veeran	Thirumalai Nayakar	
1956	Naane Raja		
1957	Pudhaiyal		
1957	Mahadhevi	Thalapathi	
1957	Soubhagyavathi	King Kasi	
1958	Uthama Puthiran	Bhoopathi	
1958	Sampoorna Ramayanam		
1958	Mangalya Bhagyam		
1958	Kathavarayan	Gypsy's Head	
1958	Annaiyin Aanai	Public prosecutor	
1959	Thaai Magalukku Kattiya Thaali	Balu	
1959	Veerapandiya Kattabomman	Oomaithurai	
1959	Maragatham		
1959	Uzhavukkum Thozhilukkum Vandhanai Seivom		

=== 1960s ===
Year	Film	Role	Notes
1960	Raja Desingu	Swaroop Singh	
1960	Kuravanji		
1960	Thanthaikku Pin Thamaiyan	Kathirvelu Pillai	
1961	Kappalottiya Thamizhan	Vaduguraman	
1962	Padithal Mattum Podhuma	Lawyer	
1963	Kalyaniyin Kanavan	Police Inspector	
1963	Vanambadi	Zamindar Marthandam	
1963	Annai Illam	Manickam	
1963	Kaithiyin Kathali		
1963	Kunkhumam	Kanthan	
1964	Karnan	Kanagan	
1964	Puthiya Paravai	Kumar	
1964	Muradan Muthu		
1965	Enga Veetu Penn		
1965	Thiruvilaiyadal	King Dhatchan	
1965	Poojaikku Vandha Malar		
1965	Anbu Karangal		
1966	Naan Aanaiyittal		
1966	Ramu		
1966	Parakkum Paavai	Balasubramaniam Vedhachalam	
1966	Enga Pappa	Mangalam's brother's friend	
1966	Thilotham		Malayalam film
1966	Sadhu Mirandal	Narasimhan	
1966	Chinnanchiru Ulagam		
1966	Madras to Pondicherry		
1966	Mani Magudam	Ponnazhagan	
1967	Kan Kanda Deivam	Criminal	
1967	Anubavi Raja Anubavi	Public Prosecutor	
1967	Kannan Karunai		
1967	Naan		
1967	Sabash Thambi		
1967	Thanga Thambi		
1967	Naan Yaar Theriyuma		
1968	Moondrezhuthu		
1968	Bommalattam	Chithambaram	
1968	Kadhal Vaaganam	Chief	
1968	Neeyum Naanum		
1968	Chakkaram		
1969	Anbu Vazhi		
1969	Thanga Surangam	Mr. Spy / Kanagasabai	
1969	Ulagam Ivvalavuthan		
1969	Pennai Vazha Vidungal		
1969	Adimai Penn	One of Prince Vengaiya's men	
1969	Anjal Petti 520		
1969	Manasatchi		

=== 1970s ===
Year	Film	Role	Notes
1970	Maanavan		
1970	Kalam Vellum	Periyaraja	
1970	Ethiroli	Thevar	
1970	CID Shankar	Leader of gang	
1970	Enga Mama	Seetha's uncle	Guest appearance
1970	Sorgam	Advocate	
1970	Thalaivan	Soma Sundaram	
1971	Aathi Parasakthi		
1971	Naangu Suvargal		
1972	Agathiyar	Vinthiyan	
1972	Vazhaiyadi Vazhai		
1972	Kurathi Magan		
1972	Raman Thediya Seethai	Singamuthu	
1973	Ganga Gowri	Lord Saniswaran	
1973	ookkari	Murugesan's elder brother	
1973	Jesus	Satan	Malayalam film
1974	Kusubalan		Posthumously released
1974	Panni Selvam		Posthumously released
