= Nandakumar (film) =

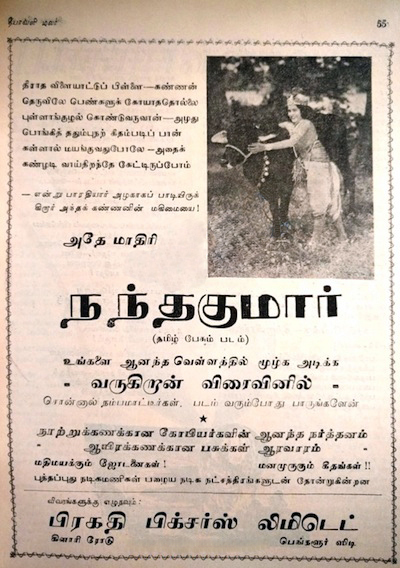
- Poster
- Directed by: Keshav Rao Dhaibar
- Written by: A. T. Krishnaswamy
- Produced by: A. V. Meiyappan
- Starring: T. P. Rajalakshmi; C. V. V. Panthulu; T. S. Rajalakshmi; T. R. Mahalingam
- Cinematography: Pai
- Music by: S. V. Venkatraman
- Production company: Pragati Pictures
- Release date: 6 August 1938
- Running time: 113 minutes
- Country: India
- Language: Tamil

Nandhakumar is a 1938 Indian Tamil-language Hindu mythological film directed by Keshav Rao Dhaibar. Produced by A. V. Meiyappan, the film stars T. P. Rajalakshmi, C. V. V. Panthulu, and T. S. Rajalakshmi. T. R. Mahalingam and T. R. Ramachandran made their cinematic debuts through the film. It was released on 6 August 1938.

== Plot ==
The film is about the birth and life of Krishna, a major Hinduism deity.

== Cast ==
- T. R. Mahalingam as Krishna
- T. P. Rajalakshmi as Yashoda
- T. R. Ramachandran
- T. S. Rajalakshmi as Radha
- Master Sethuraman as young Krishna
- C. V. V. Panthulu as Nandagopan

== Production ==
The Marathi filmmaker Keshav Rao Dhaibar planned to produce and direct a Marathi film based on the life of Lord Krishna with A. V. Meiyappan and Jayanthilal Thakore agreeing to produce the Tamil version. T. P. Rajalakshmi was signed up to play Yeshoda, with C. V. V. Panthulu, as Nandagopan. T. S. Rajalakshmi portrayed the role of Radha. T. R. Mahalingam, who was then a stage actor made his acting debut with this film at the age of 14 portraying the character of Lord Krishna. T. R. Ramachandran, who went to become a famous comedian and music composer S. V. Venkataraman started their career with this film.

Dhaibar and Meiyappan were disappointed with a song sung by the actress who portrayed Devaki's mother hence they both came up with an innovative idea to replace the soundtrack with another voice. Lalitha Venkatraman, prominent Carnatic vocalist in Mumbai was brought in to do the playback singing thus earned her the credit of being the first playback singer of Tamil cinema and also became the first Tamil film to introduce playback singing. Meiyappan took the Club House in Mount Road on lease and shot scenes with erecting the sets.

== Bibliography ==
- Dhananjayan, G. (2014). Pride of Tamil Cinema: 1931–2013. Blue Ocean Publishers. OCLC 898765509.
