= Thenkarai, Madhurai =

Neighbourhood in Madurai district, Tamil Nadu, India

Thenkarai
- Panchayat
- Location in Tamil Nadu, India
- Coordinates: 10.9366°N 76.8433°E
- Country: India
- State: Tamil Nadu
- District: Madurai
- Elevation: 509.94 m (1,673.0 ft)

Languages
  - Official: Tamil
- Time zone: UTC+5:30 (IST)
- PIN: 625207
- Telephone code: +914543******
- Vehicle registration: TN-59
- Nearest city: Madurai
- Lok Sabha constituency: Dindugul
- Vidhan Sabha constituency: Sholavandan

Thenkarai is a small village near Sholavandan situated 25 km North West of Madurai in Tamil Nadu, India. It is on the banks of River Vaigai. It also called 'Kutti Kerala' because of lot of Coconut trees found on the village.

== Religion ==
=== Hindu temple ===
A Shiva temple viz., Moolanathasamy temple which is maintained under the Hindu Religious and Charitable Endowments Department, Government of Tamil Nadu is situated in Thenkarai village.
