= Kaka Radhakrishnan =

Indian film actor (c. 1925 – 2012)

- Born: T. V. Radhakrishnan c. 1925; Sangiliyandapuram, Tiruchirappalli, Madras Presidency, British India
- Died: 14 June 2012 (aged 86); Chennai, Tamil Nadu, India
- Occupation: Actor
- Years active: 1940–2011

T. V. Radhakrishnan, better known as Kaka Radhakrishnan (c. 1925 – 14 June 2012) was an Indian actor who worked in Tamil-language films from 1940 until 2011. He is also notable for having introduced his childhood friend, Sivaji Ganesan, into films.

== Career ==
T. V. Radhakrishnan as a child made his debut with Uthama Puthiran (1940) as son of NS Krishnan. He had the prefix "kaka" (crow) attached to his name after a role he played as a young boy, in the film Mangayarkarasi (1949). In the film, he literally climbed a tree to catch a crow and since has been associated with the crow, earning him the nickname.

He acted in 1947 movie "Paithiyakaran" a NSK movie where MGR acted as a supporting character. Radhakrishnan acted in over 400 films which include Tamil, Telugu and Malayalam films. After performing a variety of roles with several actors of yesteryear Tamil cinema, he experienced renewed interest thanks to actor Kamal Haasan who believed newer audiences should not miss watching such talent.

== Family and death ==
Radhakrishnan died on 14 June 2012 following a brief illness.

== Notable filmography ==
Year	Film	Role	Notes
1949	Nallathambi		
1949	Mangayarkarasi		
1950	Laila Majnu	Mohideen	
1951	Vanasundari		
1951	Singari		
1951	Manamagal	School Student	
1952	Mappillai		
1954	Manohara	Vasanthan	
1954	Thuli Visham		
1955	Ulagam Palavidham		
1956	Rambaiyin Kaadhal		
1956	Thaikkupin Tharam		
1958	Bommai Kalyanam		
1959	Thaai Magalukku Kattiya Thaali		
1959	Manimekalai		
1963	Chittoor Rani Padmini		
1991	Guna		
1992	Thevar Magan	Chinnasamy Thevar	
1994	May Madham		
1994	Vietnam Colony		
1994	Pavithra	Subbu's grandfather	
1995	Mr. Madras		
1997	Iruvar		
1997	Kadhalukku Mariyadhai		
1998	Udhavikku Varalaamaa	Hussein's father	
1999	Unnai Thedi		
1999	Rojavanam		
1999	Poovellam Kettuppar		
1999	Hello		
1999	Unakkaga Ellam Unakkaga		
1999	Unnaruge Naan Irundhal		
2000	Eazhaiyin Sirippil	Bus owner	
2000	Maayi	Mokkaisamy's father	
2000	Seenu	Seenu's grandfather	
2001	Navvuthu Bathakalira		Telugu film
2001	Vinnukum Mannukum		
2001	Manadhai Thirudivittai		
2001	Middle Class Madhavan		
2002	Gummalam		
2004	Maanasthan		
2004	Vasool Raja MBBS	Margabandhu's father	
2006	Idhaya Thirudan		
2008	En Uyirinum Melana	Jeeva's grandfather	
