= Enga Veettu Penn =

1965 film by Tapi Chanakya

- Theatrical release poster
- Directed by: Tapi Chanakya
- Written by: Chakrapani
- Based on: Shavukaru by Chakrapani
- Produced by: Nagi Reddi; Chakrapani
- Starring: M. R. Radha; S. V. Subbaiah; A. V. M. Rajan; Nirmala
- Cinematography: Marcus Bartley
- Edited by: C. P. Jambulingam
- Music by: K. V. Mahadevan
- Production company: Vijaya Combines Productions
- Release date: 23 October 1965
- Running time: 177 minutes
- Country: India
- Language: Tamil

Enga Veettu Penn (transl. The girl of our household) is a 1965 Indian Tamil-language drama film directed by Tapi Chanakya and produced by Nagi Reddi and Chakrapani of Vijaya Combines Productions. A remake of the company's own Telugu film Shavukaru (1950), it features an ensemble cast that consists of M. R. Radha, S. V. Subbaiah, A. V. M. Rajan, Jaishankar, K. A. Thangavelu, Nagesh, V. Nagayya, O. A. K. Thevar and Nirmala, who became known as Vijaya Nirmala after its release. The film was released on 23 October 1965.

== Cast ==
Male cast

- M. R. Radha as Nagalingam
- S. V. Subbaiah as Ramaiya
- A. V. M. Rajan as Chandran
- Jaishankar as Narayanan
- K. A. Thangavelu as Thanakodi
- Nagesh as Karunaimalai
- V. Nagayya as the blind ascetic
- O. A. K. Thevar as Rangan
- Kottapuli Jayaraman as Aadiyapadham
- Usilai Mani as Vellimalai
- K. K. Soundar as Lawyer

Female cast

- Nirmala as Lakshmi
- C. Vasantha as Santha
- Manorama as Raami
- Madhavi as Bakkiam
- N. Seethalakshmi as Anjalai

== Production ==
Enga Veetu Penn was directed by Tapi Chanakya and produced by Nagi Reddi and Chakrapani of Vijaya Combines Productions. It was a remake of the company's own Telugu production Shavukaru (1950); co-producer Chakrapani doubled as screenwriter, making the film more modern compared to the Telugu original. Cinematography was handled by Marcus Bartley, editing by C. P. Jambulingam, and art direction by S. Krishna Rao and Kaladhar. S. V. Ranga Rao, originally part of the cast, criticised the casting of Nirmala as the female lead, feeling she looked "too frail" to play her character, and ordered the producers to replace her. Reddi cancelled shooting for the day. The next day, Nirmala was called back to the studio, and realised that Ranga Rao was replaced by S. V. Subbaiah. The final length of the film was 4,873 metres (15,988 ft).

== Soundtrack ==
The soundtrack was composed by K. V. Mahadevan.

Track listing
No.	Title	Lyrics	Singer(s)	Length
1.	"Deivam Malarodu Vaitha"	Kannadasan	T. M. Soundararajan, P. Susheela
2.	"Kaalkale Nillungal"	Kannadasan	T. M. Soundararajan, P. Susheela
3.	"Sirippu Paathi Azhugai Paathi"	Kannadasan	P. B. Sreenivas
4.	"Kaalkale Nillungal Kangale"	Kannadasan	P. Susheela
5.	"Iyarkkai Annai"	Alangudi Somu	Sirkazhi Govindarajan

== Release and reception ==
Enga Veetu Penn was released on 23 October 1965, Diwali day. Writing in Sport and Pastime, T. M. Ramachandran called it a "damp squib", saying that "the picture attempts to sustain the interest of the viewers with its heartwarming story but the audience cannot but see a ring of familiarity around the whole theme." He applauded the performances of the cast, particularly Jaishankar and Rajan, but criticised the abundance of songs, saying that "holds up the story many a time". After the film's release, Nirmala prefixed Vijaya, the studio's name, to her screen name.

== Bibliography ==
- Rajadhyaksha, Ashish; Willemen, Paul (1998) [1994]. Encyclopaedia of Indian Cinema. British Film Institute and Oxford University Press. ISBN 0-19-563579-5.
