= Vazhikatti =

1965 film by K. Perumal Pillai

- Poster
- Directed by: K. Perumal
- Screenplay by: Nagercoil Padmanabhan
- Starring: S. S. Rajendran; Rajasree; C. R. Vijayakumari
- Music by: Ibrahim
- Production company: Kanaga Movies
- Distributed by: SKD
- Release date: 1965
- Country: India
- Language: Tamil

Vazhikatti (transl. The guide) is a 1965 Indian Tamil-language romantic comedy film directed by K. Perumal and written by Nagercoil Padmanabhan. The film stars S. S. Rajendran, Rajasree and C. R. Vijayakumari, with V. K. Ramasamy and M. R. Radha in supporting roles. It was released after being in deadlock for nearly three years.

== Plot ==
A domestic servant is forced by his wealthy master to marry his modern daughter to avoid an awkward situation. The girl refuses to treat her former servant as her husband. He then conspires with a nurse and feigns to make love to her to create jealousy in his wife. It works and finally the husband and wife rejoin happily.

== Cast ==
- S. S. Rajendran as the servant
- Rajasree as the servant's wife
- C. R. Vijayakumari as the nurse
- V. K. Ramasamy
- M. R. Radha
- B. V. Radha

== Soundtrack ==
The music was composed by Ibrahim.

Track listing
No.	Title	Singer(s)	Length
1.	"Aayiram Per Varuvar"	P. Susheela
2.	"Ennulagam Ponnulagam"	P. Susheela
3.	"Nilavillamal Vaanirukkum"	T. M. Soundararajan, P. Susheela
4.	"Paruvam Ennum"	P. Susheela
5.	"Thaayai Kandadhillai"	T. M. Soundarajan

== Release and reception ==
Vazhikatti was released in 1965 after being in deadlock for nearly three years. T. M. Ramachandran of Sport and Pastime said the film's release "in an unostentatious manner raised some doubts as to its quality. But all the misgivings have vanished into thin air and it has turned out to be above average". He praised the performances of the lead trio, along with Padmanabhan's writing, Ibrahim's music and Perumal's direction. The Indian Express wrote, "A bane of the Tamil cinema is exaggeration – in characterisation and incidents. It has spoiled or considerably lessened the effect of many a good theme. The latest victim is Kanaka Movies' Vazhikatti." Kalki called the story outdated and predictable, but said it could be watched once for Rajendran.
