= Pachhai Vilakku (1964 film) =

1964 film by A. Bhimsingh

- Theatrical release poster
- Directed by: A. Bhimsingh
- Written by: G. K. Suriyam; Rama. Arangannal (dialogues); Ko. Iraimudi Mani (dialogues)
- Screenplay by: A. Bhimsingh
- Story by: G. K. Suriyam
- Produced by: Rama. Arangannal; A. R. Hassan Khan; T. S. Aadhi Narayanan
- Starring: Sivaji Ganesan; Sowcar Janaki; S. S. Rajendran; C. R. Vijayakumari
- Cinematography: G. Vittal Rao; D. Balakrishnan; Rm. Sedhu
- Edited by: A. Bhimsingh; Paul Duraisingam; Thirumalai
- Music by: Viswanathan–Ramamoorthy
- Production company: Vel Pictures
- Release date: 3 April 1964
- Running time: 154 minutes
- Country: India
- Language: Tamil

Pachhai Vilakku (transl. Green Light) is a 1964 Indian Tamil-language drama film, directed by A. Bhimsingh and produced by Rama. Arangannal, A. R. Hassan Khan and T. S. Aadhi Narayanan. The film stars Sivaji Ganesan, C. R. Vijayakumari, S. S. Rajendran and S. V. Ranga Rao. It was released on 3 April 1964, and became a box-office success, running for over 100 days in theatres.

== Plot ==
Sarathy (Sivaji Ganesan) is a railway engine driver. His mother dies because of inadequate medical facilities. A woman who subsequently looks after Sarathy and his brother also dies, leaving behind her daughter Sumathi (C. R. Vijayakumari).

Sarathy becomes deeply attached to Sumathi and treats her as his own sister. He makes it his life's mission to educate her and ensure she becomes a doctor, so that she can serve people who lack proper medical care.

Sumathi's marriage prospects, however, bring complications. Pasupathi (S. S. Rajendran) is interested in her, while Sarathy's uncle Rajapathar (M. R. Radha) has his own selfish designs. Sarathy's efforts to protect Sumathi's future and fulfil his promise form the central conflict.

The film combines family sentiment, sacrifice, love and social concern, with Sarathy's railway life providing the backdrop. The climax centres on his determination to overcome the conspiracies against Sumathi and fulfil his dream of seeing her become a doctor.

== Cast ==
- Sivaji Ganesan as Sarathy
- Sowcar Janaki as Parvathi
- S. S. Rajendran as Pasupathy
- C. R. Vijayakumari as Sumathi
- A. V. M. Rajan as Mani
- Pushpalatha as Latha
- S. V. Ranga Rao as Ponnambalam
- M. R. Radha as Rajabaadhar
- Nagesh as Joseph
- V. Nagayya as Gopalaiya
- S. R. Janaki as Annammal
- K. K. Soundar as Balu's henchman
- Sriram as Balu
- Karuppu Subbiah as Karim

== Production ==
M. Saravanan who was doing a film on engine driver was on search of suitable title while crossing railway gate at T. Nagar. He stuck posters with green light as main feature in a wall near the railway gate which led Bhimsingh to name his film as Pachhai Vilakku. The film was initially shot in 8,000 feet (2,400 m) which left A. V. Meiyappan unimpressed and decided to reshoot with different story on the same backdrop with the additional cast involving Rajan and Pushpalatha. Many scenes were shot at the Basin Bridge Junction railway station.

== Soundtrack ==
The music was composed by Viswanathan–Ramamoorthy and lyrics for the songs were written by Kannadasan. The songs "Olimayamaana Ethirkaalam" and "Kelvi Pirandhadhu" attained popularity.

Song	Singers	Length
"Olimayamaana Ethirkaalam"	T. M. Soundararajan	5:25
"Kuththu Vilakkeria"	T. M. Soundararajan & P. Susheela	3:42
"Thoothu Solla"	P. Susheela & L. R. Eswari	5:15
"Aval Melai Sirithaal"	P. Susheela	3:57
"Kelvi Piranthathu"	T. M. Soundararajan	5:53
"Olimayamaana"	T. M. Soundararajan	4:48
"Kanni Venduma"	P. B. Sreenivas & L. R. Eswari	3:27

== Release and reception ==
The title “Pachhai Vilakku” (Green Light) is particularly appropriate because of the film's strong railway setting; several railway-yard and train sequences were filmed at Basin Bridge Junction Pachhai Vilakku was released on 3 April 1964. The Indian Express called it "a frothy, headlong musical melodrama, designed only to entertain." P. S. Mani of Kalki gave the film a positive review, primarily for the cinematography and audiography. T. M. Ramachandran of Sport and Pastime praised the cast performances, particularly Ganesan's, but called the story unreal although he praised the location photography of the train sequences and railway yard. The film ran for over 100 days in theatres.

== Bibliography ==
- Ganesan, Sivaji; Narayana Swamy, T. S. (2007) [2002]. Autobiography of an Actor: Sivaji Ganesan, October 1928 – July 2001. Sivaji Prabhu Charities Trust. OCLC 297212002.
- Saravanan, M. (2013) [2005]. AVM 60 Cinema (in Tamil) (3rd ed.). Rajarajan Pathippagam. OCLC 1158347612.
