= Thulasi Maadam =

- Poster
- Directed by: K. B. Srinivasan
- Written by: Thamizhmaaran
- Starring: A. V. M. Rajan; Gemini Chandrakantha; V. Gopalakrishnan; Sharadha
- Music by: K. V. Mahadevan
- Production company: M. A. V. Pictures
- Release date: 15 November 1963
- Country: India
- Language: Tamil

Thulasi Maadam (transl. Basil plant) is a 1963 Indian Tamil-language film directed by K. B. Srinivasan and written by Thamizhmaaran. The film stars A. V. M. Rajan, Gemini Chandraknatha (in dual roles), V. Gopalakrishnan and Sharadha.

== Plot ==
Mary and Janaki are two look-alike women but they are not related to each other. Mary is the daughter of a retired collector and Janaki is from a middle-class family. Mary is affianced to Thomas, an army officer while Janaki is married to a company executive. Janaki gives birth to a child and is found to have tuberculosis, so, her mother-in-law separates her from the child. In the meantime, Janaki's mother dies. The mother-in-law's adopted son Peter feels pity for the separated Janaki and her child. Accidentally he meets Mary, the look-alike of Janaki. Peter comes out with a clever plan and swaps Mary with Janaki. Several complications arise and finally the families are united.

== Cast ==
The list is adapted from The Hindu article.

- A. V. M. Rajan as Company Executive
- Gemini Chandrakantha as Mary and Janaki
- V. Gopalakrishnan as Thomas
- Sharadha
- S. N. Lakshmi
- M. S. Sundari Bai
- Master Gopal as Peter
- Seethalakshmi
- A. Karunanidhi
- S. Kathiresan

== Production ==
The film was produced by M. A. Venu who earlier produced award-winning films like Sampoorna Ramayanam and Mudhalali. Screenplay and dialogues were written by Thamizhmaran.

== Soundtrack ==
Music was composed by K. V. Mahadevan. The song "Aadum Mayile Aattam Engey" became a super hit.

Song	Singer	Lyrics	Length
"Aadum MAyile Aattam Enge"	T. M. Soundararajan	Ka. Mu. Sheriff	03:52
"Chithirai Maadha Nilavinile"	T. M. Soundararajan	Ka. Mu. Sheriff	03:29
"Ammaadiyo Athaanukku Kovatha Paaru"	S. Janaki	Ka. Mu. Sheriff	
"Kalyaana Saappadu Podum Munne"	S. Janaki	Thiruchi Thiyagarajan	03:37
"Maiyai Thottu Ezhudhiyavar"	S. Janaki & Soolamangalam Rajalakshmi	Thiruchi Thiyagarajan	03:31

== Reception ==
Writing for Sport and Pastime, T. M. Ramachandran said the director "has shown much courage in tackling a ticklish subject". Despite this, the film did not fare well at the box office.
