= Alli (film) =

1964 film by S. S. Rajendran

- Theatrical release poster
- Directed by: S. S. Rajendran
- Written by: Nagercoil Padmanabhan
- Produced by: S. S. Rajendran
- Starring: S. S. Rajendran; R. Vijayakumari; Sowcar Janaki
- Cinematography: Sundarababu
- Edited by: Devan
- Music by: K. V. Mahadevan
- Production company: Rajendran Pictures
- Release date: 5 March 1964
- Country: India
- Language: Tamil

Alli is a 1964 Indian Tamil-language film produced and directed by S. S. Rajendran, and written by Nagercoil Padmanabhan. Rajendran also stars along with R. Vijayakumari and Sowcar Janaki playing the title character. The film was released on 5 March 1964.

== Plot ==
Kannan is an idealistic police officer whose sense of duty transcends family ties and normal human sentiment. His loyalty to duty extends to making sure his friends and relatives, as well as his superiors, are taken into account of justice. He overcomes cognitive dissonance and performs his duty to truth and justice, even when that means arresting loved ones. At a pivotal moment of the film, he books his own beloved when he discovers she is guilty of theft. The film ends with the reunion of the lovers. But Kannan's beloved, having given away her eyesight to him, enters prison as an atonement for the crime she committed early in her life.

== Cast ==
Male cast

- S. S. Rajendran as Kannan
- Sahasranamam as Somu
- Ashokan as the fakir
- Rajan as Babu
- Nagesh as Kathiri
- D. V. Narayanasami as S. B.

Female cast

- R. Vijayakumari Myna
- Sowcar Janaki as Alli
- Pushpalatha as Shanthi
- Baby Padmini as Uma
- Pushpavalli as the mother
- Pushpamala as Ranjitham
- Meenakumari as Meena
- Geethanjali as the dancer

== Production ==
S. S. Rajendran directed and produced Alli under his production company Rajendran Pictures, in addition to starring. Nagercoil Padmanabhan wrote the story and dialogue, Devan handled the editing, and Sundarababu handled the cinematography.

== Soundtrack ==
The soundtrack was composed by K. V. Mahadevan.

Track listing
No.	Title	Lyrics	Singer(s)	Length
1.	"Kaveri Meenadiyo"	Kannadasan	T. M. Soundararajan, P. Susheela
2.	"Andhi Malar"	Alangudi Somu	S. V. Ponnusamy, K. Jamuna Rani
3.	"Kanni Pennai"	M. K. Athmanathan	P. Susheela
4.	"Ennunga Ennai Theriyuma"	Panchu Arunachalam	P. Susheela
5.	"Unnaiyanri"	Kannadasan	P. Susheela
6.	"Nalungu Paadava"	Panchu Arunachalam	S. Janaki

== Release and reception ==
Alli was released on 5 March 1964. The critic from The Indian Express likened Rajendran to a Jack of all trades, saying, "If producer-director-actor-MLA S. S. Rajendran had realised this and acted accordingly, Alli [...] would have been much more appealing. In trying to do too many things at the same time, Rajendran has taken upon himself more than he could have handled." T. M. Ramachandran of Sport and Pastime positively reviewed the film for the performances of Rajendran, Vijayakumari, Janaki and the supporting cast, in addition to Nagesh's comedy and Sundarababu's cinematography. Link also praised Rajendran and Janaki's performances. Kanthan of Kalki compared the film to Ezhai Padum Padu and Neethikkupin Paasam, saying those who did not watch those two would enjoy this.
