= Vazhi Piranthadu =

- Directed by: A. K. Velan
- Written by: A. K. Velan
- Starring: S. S. Rajendran; C. R. Vijayakumari; M. R. Radha
- Music by: K. V. Mahadevan
- Production company: Arunachalam Pictures
- Release date: 22 August 1964
- Running time: 2:19:24 (3824 m)
- Country: India
- Language: Tamil

Vazhi Piranthadu (transl. A Way Opened) is a 1964 Indian Tamil-language film written and directed by A. K. Velan. The film stars S. S. Rajendran, C. R. Vijayakumari and M. R. Radha.

== Cast ==
This list is adapted from the book Thiraikalanjiyam Part-2.

Male cast

- S. S. Rajendran
- M. R. Radha
- Kuladeivam Rajagopal
- P. D. Sambandam
- Karikol Raju
- B. S. Thadchanamurthi
- Ramakrishnan
- Archunan

Female cast

- Vijayakumari
- C. Lakshmi Rajyam
- Lakshmiprabha
- S. N. Lakshmi
- Jayanthi
- Seethalakshmi

== Production ==
The film was produced under the banner Arunachalam Pictures and was directed by A. K. Velan who also wrote the story, screenplay and dialogues.

== Soundtrack ==
Music was composed by K. V. Mahadevan. A song written by Mahakavi Subramania Bharathiyar was used in the film.

| Song | Singer/s | Lyricist |
|---|---|---|
| "Pengal Viduthalai Petra" | | Mahakavi Subramania Bharathiyar |
| "Azhuvathu Yenammaa" | P. Leela | A. K. Velan |
| "Pasuvaiyum Padaiththu" | T. M. Soundararajan | A. K. Velan |
| "Chilaiye En Nilai Theriya" | T. M. Soundararajan | A. K. Velan |
| "Azhuvaamal Azhuginra Penne" | T. M. Soundararajan | A. K. Velan |
| "Chithiram Thaan Kalaindhatho" | T. M. Soundararajan | A. K. Velan |
| "Senthaamarai Malar Pol" | T. M. Soundararajan | A. Maruthakasi |
| "Chinnangchiru Pennaippole" | P. Susheela | A. Maruthakasi |
| "Muththip Pochu Idhukku" | K. Rani & group | A. Maruthakasi |
| "Vazhi Piranthadu, Nalla Vazhi Piranthadu" | K. Rani & group | Suratha |
| "Veettukkaariyaa Kootti Vandhu" | A. L. Raghavan & K. Jamuna Rani | P. K. Muthusamy |
