= Kaakum Karangal =

1965 film by A. C. Tirulokchandar

- Theatrical release poster
- Directed by: A. C. Tirulokchandar
- Story by: A. C. Tirulokchandar
- Produced by: M. Murugan; M. Kumaran; M. Saravanan; M. Balasubramanian
- Starring: S. S. Rajendran; C. R. Vijayakumari
- Cinematography: T. Muthusamy
- Edited by: R. G. Gop
- Music by: K. V. Mahadevan
- Production company: Murugan Brothers
- Distributed by: AVM Productions
- Release date: 19 June 1965
- Running time: 140 minutes
- Country: India
- Language: Tamil

Kaakum Karangal (transl. Protecting Hands) is a 1965 Indian Tamil-language drama film, directed by A. C. Tirulokchandar. Inspired by British writer W. Somerset Maugham's 1925 novel The Painted Veil, it was produced by Murugan Brothers, a subsidiary of AVM Productions. The film stars S. S. Rajendran and C. R. Vijayakumari, with Nagesh, L. Vijayalakshmi, S. V. Subbaiah, Sivakumar (in his acting debut) and Revathi playing supporting roles. It was released on 19 June 1965, and failed at the box office.

== Plot ==
Shankar's father dies due to lack of medical assistance. His mother, with great difficulty, educates him to be a surgeon. One day, his visit to treat Mahalakshmi develops into love for each other. Subbaiah, a rich man and father of Mahalakshmi, objects to this, but finally agrees, saying that she must leave his house. After some time, Mahalakshmi begets a child, but the child dies in a fire accident. This causes a misunderstanding between Shankar and Mahalakshmi. Shankar feels that his hands cannot perform surgery anymore. He opts for a service with tribals at Senjipuram. There, he gets affected by viral fever. What happens from there is the rest of the film.

== Cast ==
- S. S. Rajendran as Dr. Shankar
- C. R. Vijayakumari as Mahalakshmi
- Sivakumar as Surendar
- Manimala
- Nagesh as Somasundaram
- L. Vijayalakshmi as Vijayalakshmi
- S. N. Lakshmi as Shankar's mother
- Revathi as Radha
- S. V. Subbaiah as Ranganathan
- S. V. Ramadas as Ramalingam

== Production ==
The film marked the acting debut of Sivakumar, then known by his name at birth Palaniswamy. He had already signed a film titled Chithrapournami, but that was shelved. Its directors Krishnan–Panju recommended him to AVM Productions for their film Kaakum Karangal. Tirulokchandar, who was searching for the second lead actor to pair with Vijayakumari, selected Palaniswamy, who was rechristened Sivakumar by AVM founder A. V. Meiyappan. The film was produced by Murugan Brothers, a subsidiary of AVM. Saravanan revealed he had to reduce Sivakumar's portions because the actress who played his love interest him could not do justice to the acting.

Due to the success of Naanum Oru Penn (1963), Meiyappan wanted its lead actors S. S. Rajendran and C. R. Vijayakumari to star. Saravanan felt Rajendran looked ill-suited for a sophisticated character, but Meiyappan remained adamant about casting him for the role. S. P. Muthuraman, who worked as one of the assistant directors in the film revealed that the crew had a tough time to make a small baby walk. Cinematography was handled by T. Muthusamy, and the editing by R. G. Gop. According to Randor Guy, the film's plot was inspired by the novel The Painted Veil by British writer W. Somerset Maugham.

== Soundtrack ==
The soundtrack was composed by K. V. Mahadevan. This was his first collaboration with AVM.

Track listing
No.	Title	Lyrics	Singer(s)	Length
1.	"Thirunaal Vandhathu"	Vaali	P. Susheela	4:01
2.	"Akka Akka Aasai"	Kannadasan	P. Susheela	4:40
3.	"Azhagiya Rathiyae"	Vaali	A. L. Raghavan, L. R. Eswari	5:48
4.	"Gnayiru Enbathu"	Vaali	T. M. Soundararajan, P. Susheela	3:57
5.	"Alli Thandhu"	Vaali	T. M. Soundararajan, P. Susheela	4:10
Total length:				22:36

== Release and reception ==
Kaakum Karangal was released on 19 June 1965. T. M. Ramachandran of Sport and Pastime wrote, "The central theme is familiar to some extent, some of the sequences follow the beaten track and there is an overdose of melodrama. The picture, however manages to win the sympathy and appreciation of the audience on account of the poignancy and dignity with which the whole story has been told on screen". Kalki appreciated the performances of Rajendran and Vijayakumari in the first half, but felt the latter slipped in the film's second half. According to Saravanan, the film failed at the box office due to miscasting.

== Bibliography ==
- Saravanan, M. (2013) [2005]. AVM 60 Cinema (in Tamil) (3rd ed.). Rajarajan Pathippagam. OCLC 1158347612.
