= Vettaikkaran (1964 film) =

1964 film by M. A. Thirumugam

- Theatrical release poster
- Directed by: M. A. Thirumugam
- Story by: Aaroor Dass
- Produced by: Sandow M. M. A. Chinnappa Thevar
- Starring: M. G. Ramachandran; Savitri Ganesh
- Cinematography: N. S. Varma
- Edited by: M. A. Thirumugam; M. G. Balu Rao; M. A. Mariappan
- Music by: K. V. Mahadevan
- Production company: Devar Films
- Distributed by: Emgeeyar Pictures
- Release date: 14 January 1964
- Running time: 157 minutes
- Country: India
- Language: Tamil

Vettaikkaran (transl. Hunter) is a 1964 Indian Tamil-language action drama film directed by M. A. Thirumugam and produced by Sandow M. M. A. Chinnappa Thevar. The film stars M. G. Ramachandran and Savitri Ganesh, with M. R. Radha, M. N. Nambiar, S. A. Ashokan, Thai Nagesh, M. V. Rajamma, Manorama and Baby Shakila in supporting roles. It revolves around an estate hunter whose penchant for hunting displeases his family, and a plunderer who lusts for his wealth.

Vettaikkaran was released on 14 January 1964, Pongal day. The film was a commercial success, running for 25 weeks(175 days) in theatres.

== Plot ==
Babu, a wealthy estate owner living with his widowed mother, spends much of his time hunting, a habit that often troubles the two and worries his mother. His estate manager, Mayavan, secretly operates as a plunderer and has long aimed to take over Babu’s wealth. During one of his routine trips into the forest, Babu meets Latha. Their meeting evolves into a romantic relationship and a marriage. Latha eventually gives birth to their son, Raja.

Latha is soon diagnosed with tuberculosis and must undergo treatment away from her newborn. She is heartbroken as she is unable to nurture her baby until she completely recovers. Babu assumes responsibility for both his recovering wife and their child, which results in Raja forming a deep attachment to him while remaining emotionally distant from Latha. This growing imbalance creates tension in the couple’s relationship. As Raja grows, he begins to mirror his father’s interest in hunting, something Latha quietly opposes, adding further strain to the household.

Mayavan uses the family’s fragile situation to advance his long-planned scheme. He lures Latha and Raja into the forest and threatens them, attempting to force Babu into surrendering control of the estate. Babu reaches them in time and puts an end to Mayavan’s life. The crisis finally softens the distance in their home, and the film ends with Raja expressing that he now loves both his parents equally.

== Cast ==
- M. G. Ramachandran as Babu
- Savitri Ganesh as Latha
- M. R. Radha as Sundaram
- M. N. Nambiar as Mayavan
- S. A. Ashokan
- Thai Nagesh as Jokkar
- M. V. Rajamma as Babu's mother
- Manorama as Jokkar's wife
- Baby Shakila as Raja

== Production ==
Vettaikkaran was directed by M. A. Thirumugam and produced by Sandow M. M. A. Chinnappa Thevar under Devar Films. A real leopard was brought for filming.

== Soundtrack ==
The soundtrack is composed by K. V. Mahadevan, with lyrics by Kannadasan. According to Sachi Sri Kantha, the song "Unnai Arinthaal", through its lyrics which go "Unnai arinthaal – Nee unnai arinthaal, Ulagathil pooradalam" (Know yourself – You, know yourself, then you can fight the world) serves as an "MGR self-praise song, equating his 'good traits' to that of a living God" and Kannadasan "incorporates the Socratic wisdom of 'Know thyself' in the beginning lines".

Track listing
No.	Title	Singer(s)	Length
1.	"Manjal Mugame"	T. M. Soundararajan, P. Susheela	3:18
2.	"Katha Naayagan"	P. Susheela	3:04
3.	"En Kannanukkethani"	P. Susheela	3:18
4.	"Seettu Kattu Raja"	L. R. Eswari, A. L. Raghavan	3:26
5.	"Velli Nila"	T. M. Soundararajan	3:18
6.	"Methuva Methuva"	T. M. Soundararajan, P. Susheela	3:32
7.	"Unnai Arinthaal"	T. M. Soundararajan	5:13
Total length:			25:09

== Release ==
Vettaikkaran was released on 14 January 1964, Pongal day, and distributed by Ramachandran's Emgeeyar Pictures. To promote the film, the Madras-based Chitra theatre had a jungle set to welcome audiences. After much deliberation, they also managed to get a caged tiger inside the theatre premises. Despite facing competition from another Pongal release Karnan, the film became a box office success, running for 25 weeks in theatres. It was dubbed Telugu-language as Inti Donga and released on 4 September 1964.

== Reception ==
The Indian Express wrote on 17 January 1964, "Loaded with fun and frolic with a substantial sprinkling of spicy scenes and intriguing drama told in a fascinating manner, [Vettaikkaran] is designed to please the filmgoer." T. M. Ramachandran of Sport and Pastime wrote on 22 February, "One would presume that Vettaikkaran, to justify the title, would provide all the thrills and excitement of big game hunting. But there is nothing of that sort in the film [...] The story is of course a hotchpotch of various ideas and punches freely borrowed from foreign films. The swift tempo with which the latter half of the film moves covers up a major portion of its deficiencies". On 26 January, Kanthan of Kalki said the film could be watched for the leopard, the scenery and the acting of Shakila.

== Bibliography ==
- Kannan, R. (28 June 2017). MGR: A Life. India: Penguin Random House. ISBN 978-93-86495-88-4.
