= Parisu =

- Theatrical release poster
- Directed by: D. Yoganand
- Dialogue by: Aaroor Dass
- Story by: K. P. Kottarakkara
- Produced by: D. Yoganand; K. P. Kottarakkara
- Starring: M. G. Ramachandran; Savitri; M. R. Radha
- Cinematography: P. Ramasamy
- Edited by: G. D. Joshi
- Music by: K. V. Mahadevan
- Production company: Gowri Pictures
- Release date: 15 November 1963
- Running time: 149 minutes
- Country: India
- Language: Tamil

Parisu (transl. Gift) is a 1963 Indian Tamil-language film directed by D. Yoganand. The film stars M. G. Ramachandran, Savitri and M. R. Radha. It was released on 15 November 1963, Diwali day.

== Plot ==
To infiltrate the needs for his investigation, Venu, an elite policeman, sees his love life being upset. He has to give up the only woman for him, Ponni, an innocent provincial, to take the hand of the most attractive, Shanti, younger sister of Viswam, an enigmatic notable. It is under this condition that Viswam accepts him to marry Mala, younger sister of Raghu, Venu's childhood friend, who was assaulted lethally instead of the policeman. Venu swore then to his dying friend to stay up her sister, who is in love with Viswam. Because of the promise made to Raghu and the horrible blackmail exercised by Viswam, Venu resigns. This is a situation which is not to displease all, it suits perfectly to Rangadurai, a good-for-nothing and kin of Ponni, since he has desired her for a long time. Venu is not at the end of his surprises, many new developments still await him.

== Cast ==
- M. G. Ramachandran as Venu
- Savitri as Ponni
- M. R. Radha as Rangadurai
- M. N. Nambiar as Viswam
- Nagesh as Jimmy
- Ragini as Shanti
- Rajasulochana as Mala
- M. K. Mustapha as Raghu
- S. M. Thirupathisamy as Ramaiya

== Production ==
Parisu is the maiden venture of Gowri Pictures, and was initially titled Kathal Parisu (transl. Gift of love).

== Soundtrack ==
The music was composed by K. V. Mahadevan, with lyrics by Kannadasan.

Song	Singers	Length
"Aalai Paarthu"	P. Susheela	02:44
"Enna Enna Inikkuthu"	T. M. Soundararajan, P. Susheela	03:39
"Kaalamennum Nadhiyinile"	P. Susheela	03:30
"Koondhal Karuppu"	T. M. Soundararajan, P. Susheela	03:56
"Pattuvanna Chittu"	T. M. Soundararajan	03:36
"Ponnulagam Nokki Pogindrom"	P. Susheela	03:37

== Release and reception ==
Parisu was released on 15 November 1963, Diwali day. Writing for Sport and Pastime, T. M. Ramachandran said, "The story is inconsequential. At best, it is used as a peg to hang the various songs, oft-repeated romantic and comic interludes and fighting sequences". Kanthan of Kalki criticised the story for lack of originality.
