= Panam Panthiyile =

1961 film by Krishna Rao

- Poster
- Directed by: Krishna Rao
- Screenplay by: Salem Natarajan
- Story by: Era. Chezhiyan
- Produced by: M. A. Venu
- Starring: S. S. Rajendran; M. R. Radha; C. R. Vijayakumari; Rajasree
- Music by: K. V. Mahadevan
- Production company: MAV Pictures
- Release date: 7 November 1961
- Running time: 2:41:06 (14499 ft.)
- Country: India
- Language: Tamil

Panam Panthiyile (transl. Money is the vanguard) is a 1961 Indian Tamil-language film produced by MAV Pictures. The film was directed by Krishna Rao and stars S. S. Rajendran, M. R. Radha, C. R. Vijayakumari and Rajasree. It was released on 7 November 1961. The film was remade in Malayalam as Ozhukkinethire.

== Cast ==
The list is adapted from Thiraikalanjiyam and from the film credits.

Male cast

- S. S. Rajendran
- M. R. Radha
- V. K. Ramasamy
- A. Karunanidhi
- V. M. Ezhumalai
- T. V. Sathiyamoorthi
- Rathinam
- V. P. S. Mani
- M. A. Ganapathi
- C. K. Soundararajan

Female cast

- C. R. Vijayakumari
- Rajasree
- Pushpalatha
- Gemini Chandra
- Indrakala
- Vasantha
- S. N. Lakshmi

== Production ==
The film was produced by M. A. Venu under his own banner MAV Pictures and was directed by Krishna Rao. The story was written by Era. Chezhiyan and the dialogues were penned by Salem Natarajan.

== Soundtrack ==
The music was composed by K. V. Mahadevan and the lyrics were penned by Ka. Mu. Sheriff.

Song	Singer/s
"Enguminge Iyarkaiyin Kaadchi"	T. M. Soundararajan & S. Janaki
"Panam Panthiyile Kunam Kuppaiyile"	Sirkazhi Govindarajan
"Aadavenum Paadavenum Inbamaaga"	T. M. Soundararajan
"Irukkum Idaththai Viddu Illaatha Idathilellaam"	T. M. Soundararajan
"Thattaan Kadaiyile Thaaliyirukku"	T. M. Soundararajan & Soolamangalam Rajalakshmi
"Panam Irukkumpodhu Oru Pechchu"	S. V. Ponnusamy & L. R. Eswari
"Kallum Kallum Modhumpothu Kanal Pirakkuthu"	T. M. Soundararajan & P. Susheela

== Reception ==
Reviewing Panam Panthiyiley, one magazine wrote, “Radha illayel padam kuppayiley!” (without Radha, the film will be in trashcans!).
