= Aasai Alaigal =

- Poster
- Directed by: A. S. A. Sami
- Written by: A. S. A. Sami
- Produced by: J. D. Farnando; Arockiya Raj
- Starring: S. S. Rajendran; C. R. Vijayakumari; M. R. Radha; Sowcar Janaki
- Cinematography: R. M. Pillai
- Edited by: P. V. Karunakaran
- Music by: K. V. Mahadevan
- Production company: Anbu Films
- Release date: 1963
- Running time: 135 minutes
- Country: India
- Language: Tamil

Aasai Alaigal (transl. Tides of desire) is a 1963 Indian Tamil-language drama film directed by A. S. A. Samy and produced by J. D. Fernando. The film stars S. S. Rajendran, C. R. Vijayakumari, M. R. Radha and Sowcar Janaki.

== Plot ==
Amudha, a girl from a rich family, loves and marries Durai who is from a middle-class family. They beget two children. Amudha wants to live a lavish life whereas Durai thinks love is God. Amudha's brother Manickam spends all his share of his father's wealth and comes to live with Amudha. He soon finds the difference of opinion between Amudha and her husband and tries to blow it up. In the meantime, Naganathan, a friend of Durai gets an accident and dies. Before dying he requests Durai to take care of his wife Thangam and children. Durai works overtime to help Thangam. Manickam tells Amudha that Durai is having an affair with Thangam. As a result, Durai and Amudha fight and get separated. How the family gets together forms the rest of the story.

== Cast ==
- S. S. Rajendran as Durai Raj
- C. R. Vijayakumari as Amutha
- M. R. Radha as Manikkam
- Sowcar Janaki as Thangam
- Nagesh as Peethambaram
- Kutty Padmini as Kannamma
- K. Balaji as Naganathan
- Gemini K. Chandra as Sundari
- Sandhiya as Bhakyavathi
- S. Rama Rao as Pakkiri
- Baby Sumathi as Shanthi

== Soundtrack ==
Music was composed by K. V. Mahadevan.

Song	Singer	Lyrics	Length
"Anbu Enbathu"	Sirkazhi Govindarajan, L. R. Eswari & K. Jamuna Rani	Kannadasan	4:06
"Anbu Enbathu" – 2	Sirkazhi Govindarajan, L. R. Eswari & K. Jamuna Rani	Kannadasan	1:48
"ChinnanChiru Magalai"	P.Susheela	Kannadasan	03:51
"Antha Mayakkam Vendum"	L. R. Eswari & K. Jamuna Rani	Kannadasan	4:20
"Sollap Pona... Yaarai Enge Vaipathu"	S. V. Ponnusamy	Panchu Arunachalam	2:51
"Nadanthu Vantha"	T. M. Soundararajan	Panchu Arunachalam	4:26

== Reception ==
Kanthan of Kalki said those expecting too much from the film would be disappointed.
