= Paadha Kaanikkai =

1962 film by K. Shankar

- Theatrical release poster
- Directed by: K. Shankar
- Written by: M. S. Solamalai
- Produced by: G. N. Velumani
- Starring: Gemini Ganesan; Savitri; Vijayakumari
- Cinematography: Thambu
- Edited by: K. Shankar; K. Narayanan
- Music by: Viswanathan–Ramamoorthy
- Production company: Saravana Films
- Release date: 14 July 1962
- Running time: 158 minutes
- Country: India
- Language: Tamil

Paadha Kaanikkai (transl. Offering to the feet) is a 1962 Tamil-language drama film directed by K. Shankar and written by M. S. Solamalai. The film stars Gemini Ganesan and Savitri, with C. R. Vijayakumari, M. R. Radha, and Kamal Haasan in supporting roles. It was released on 14 July 1962.

== Cast ==
- Gemini Ganesan as Sekar
- Savitri as Malathi
- C. R. Vijayakumari as Chitra
- M. R. Radha as Veerasamy Pillai
- J. P. Chandrababu as Veerasamy Pillai's son
- Kamal Haasan as Ravi
- S. V. Subbaiah as Namachivayam, Manickam and Sekar's father
- S. A. Ashokan as Manickam
- M. V. Rajamma as Parvathi, Manickam and Sekar’s stepmother
- C. K. Saraswathi as Eshwari
- Karikol Raju as Villager
- S. Rama Rao as Pardeshi
- D. Balasubramaniam
- Padmini Priyadarshini
- K. R. Indira Devi

== Production ==
Paadha Kaanikkai was produced by G. N. Velumani, directed and edited by K. Shankar, and written by M. S. Solamalai.

== Soundtrack ==
The music was composed by Viswanathan-Ramamoorthy, with lyrics by Kannadasan. The song "Poojaikku Vandha" is set in Bhimpalasi raga.

Song	Singers	Length
"Aththai Magane"	P. Susheela	04:07
"Ettadakku Maligaiyil"	P. Susheela	04:24
"Kadhal Enbathu"	P. B. Sreenivas, P. Susheela, J. P. Chandrababu, L. R. Eswari	04:58
"Poojaikku Vantha"	P. B. Sreenivas, S. Janaki	03:54
"Sonnathellam"	P. Susheela, L. R. Eswari	03:48
"Thaniya Thavikkira"	J. P. Chandrababu	03:44
"Unathu Malar"	P. Susheela, L. R. Eswari	03:59
"Veedu Varai Uravu"	T. M. Soundararajan	05:25

== Release and reception ==
Paadha Kaanikkai was released on 14 July 1962. The Indian Express wrote in a panning review on 10 August, "In Saravana Films' [Paatha Kaanikai], one gets to know what boredom is. A meaning or purpose is difficult to deduce from this shoddy yarn." The reviewer noted that the characters were "poorly drawn" and criticised the direction by K. Shankar, noting that the actors "make the best of a bad job". Kalki also negatively reviewed the film but praised the performances of certain actors. According to historian Randor Guy, the film failed commercially, mainly due to "its predictable storyline and theatrical look."
