= K. V. Mahadevan =

Background information
- Born: Krishnankoil Venkadachalam Mahadevan 14 March 1918; Krishnancoil, Nagercoil, present-day Kanyakumari District
- Died: 21 June 2001 (aged 83) Chennai, Tamil Nadu, India
- Genres: Film score, Theatre
- Occupations: Music director
- Instruments: Keyboard, piano
- Years active: 1942–1992

Krishnankoil Venkadachalam Mahadevan (14 March 1918 – 21 June 2001) was an Indian composer, singer-songwriter, music producer, and musician who won the inaugural National Film Award for Best Music Direction in (1967) for Kandan Karunai. Known for his works in Tamil, Telugu, Malayalam, and Kannada films. He is best known for his contributions in works such as Manchi Manasulu (1962), Lava Kusa (1963), Thiruvilaiyadal (1965), Saraswathi Sabatham (1966), Kandan Karunai (1967), Thillana Mohanambal (1968), Adimai Penn (1969), Balaraju Katha (1970), Athiparasakthi (1971), Sankarabharanam (1979), Saptapadi (1981), Sirivennela (1986), Sruthilayalu (1987), Sutradharulu (1989), Pelli Pustakam (1991), and Swathi Kiranam (1992).

A contemporary of M. S. Viswanathan and T. K. Ramamoorthy, starting his career in 1942 with Manonmani, Mahadevan scored music for over six hundred feature films, spanning four decades, and has garnered two National Film Awards, three Andhra Pradesh state Nandi Awards, a Tamil Nadu State Film Award, and a Filmfare Award South. He was also conferred the title of "Thirai Isai Thilagam" (Pride of Cine Music Directors) in Tamil cinema. His assistant Pukazhenthi is credited to have usually writing the score and arranging the orchestra, after Mahadevan composes a tune.

== Early life and career ==
K. V. Mahadevan was born on 14 March 1918 to Venkadachalam Bhagavathar and Pichaiyammal in Krishnancoil, a locality in Nagercoil, Kanyakumari District. K. V. Mahadevan, also called by his honorific name Thirai Isai Thilagam (lit. pride of film music), composed music for more than 50 years, beginning from 1942 until 1993.

The Telugu film industry crowned him with the title "Swara Brahma" (lit. Creator/Father of musical notes). His song "mama mama mama" from the 1962 Telugu movie Manchi Manasulu became popular in those days, and as a result, the Telugu film industry began calling him affectionately as "Mama" since then. He was celebrated for his seamless ability to compose across different languages. Despite Telugu not being his mother tongue, he consistently captured the native essence of the language by deeply understanding the lyrics before composing. His frequent collaborator and assistant, Puhalendi, played a crucial role in shaping the distinctive orchestration and interludes that defined their signature sound. Mahadevan built enduring partnerships with prominent filmmakers, including directors K. Raghavendra Rao, Bapu, Kodi Ramakrishna, and actor-producer Mohan Babu. His work commanded immense loyalty; producer K. Murari of Yuva Chitra Arts was such an ardent admirer that he reportedly stopped producing films entirely after Mahadevan retired. A major career milestone occurred when the production house Sathya Chitra insisted on retaining Mahadevan for N. T. Rama Rao's Adavi Ramudu (1977). The soundtrack was a massive success, featuring enduring hits like "Krushi Vunte Manushulu Rushulavutaaru," and helping the movie become the highest-grossing Telugu film of the 1970s. Director K. Raghavendra Rao held Mahadevan in such high regard that he referred to him as a "Saraswati Putra" (Son of Goddess Saraswati). Perhaps his most legendary collaboration was with director K. Viswanath, a partnership that profoundly impacted Telugu cinema. Their crowning achievement, Sankarabharanam (1980), successfully brought classical music to mainstream audiences. While contemporary musician and actress P. Bhanumathi initially criticized Mahadevan for presenting "lighter," more accessible versions of traditional Carnatic ragas in the film, the approach proved historically influential. Bhanumathi and Mahadevan later set aside any artistic differences, and she went on to sing his composition "Shree Surya Narayanaa Melukoo" for the 1984 film Mangammagari Manavadu.

== Filmography ==
=== Tamil ===
- Manonmani (1942) – Credited as Kalyanam Orchestra
- Aanandan or Akkini Puraana Magimai (1942) – Credited as Kalyanam Orchestra with G. Ramanathan
- Dhana Amaravathi (1947)
- Devadasi (1948)
- Jambam (1948)
- Kumari (1952)
- Madana Mohini (1953)
- Rohini (1953) – with G. Ramanathan and D. C. Dutt
- Naalvar (1953)
- Nallakalam (1954)
- Mangalyam (1954)
- Koondukkili (1954)
- Mullaivanam (1955)
- Pennarasi (1955)
- Asai Anna Arumai Thambi (1955)
- Town Bus (1955)
- Moondru Pengal (1956)
- Thaaikkuppin Thaaram (1956)
- Makkalai Petra Magarasi (1957)
- Raja Rajan (1957)
- Neelamalai Thirudan (1957)
- Mudhalali (1957)
- Magudam Katha Mangai (1957)
- Thai Pirandhal Vazhi Pirakkum (1958)
- Nalla Idathu Sambandham (1958)
- Sampoorna Ramayanam (1958)
- Bommai Kalyanam (1958)
- Thirudargal Jakkirathai (1958)
- Sengottai Singam (1958)
- Pillai Kaniyamudhu (1958)
- Peria Koil (1958)
- Manamulla Maruthaaram (1958)
- Neelavukku Neranja Manasu (1958)
- Sollu Thambi Sollu (1959)
- Madhavi (1959)
- Thayapola Pillai Noolapola Selai (1959)
- Uzhavukkum Thozhilukkum Vandhanai Seivom (1959)
- Vaazha Vaitha Deivam (1959)
- Vannakili (1959)
- Alli Petra Pillai (1959)
- Naalu Veli Nilam (1959)
- Kaveriyin Kanavan (1959)
- Abalai Anjugam (1959)
- Panchaali (1959)
- Engal Kuladevi (1959)
- Revathi (1960)
- Thanthaikku Pin Thamaiyan (1960)
- Sivagami (1960)
- Aada Vandha Deivam (1960)
- Thangam Manasu Thangam (1960)
- Mahalakshmi (1960)
- Padikkadha Medhai (1960)
- Engal Selvi (1960)
- Ponni Thirunaal (1960)
- Paavai Vilakku (1960)
- Yanai Paagan (1960)
- Pudhiya Pathai (1960)
- Thangarathinam (1960)
- Kaithi Kannayiram (1960)
- Veerakkanal (1960)
- Kongunattu Thangam (1961)
- Ellam Unakkaga (1961)
- Sabaash Mapillai (1961)
- Kumudham (1961)
- Thayilla Pillai (1961)
- Panam Panthiyile (1961)
- Thai Sollai Thattathe (1961)
- Panithirai (1961)
- Rani Samyuktha (1962)
- Madappura (1962)
- Sarada (1962)
- Valar Pirai (1962)
- Thayai Katha Thanayan (1962)
- Vadivukku Valai Kappu (1962)
- Kudumba Thalaivan (1962)
- Azhagu Nila (1962)
- Neeya Naana (1962)
- Kavitha (1962)
- Muthu Mandapam (1962)
- Sengamala Theevu (1962)
- Asthikkoru Aanum Asaikku Oru Ponnum (1962)
- Pirandha Naal (1962)
- Kadavulai Kanden (1963)
- Koduthu Vaithaval (1963)
- Dharmam Thalai Kaakkum (1963)
- Vanambadi (1963)
- Neengadha Ninaivu (1963)
- Iruvar Ullam (1963)
- Kattu Roja (1963)
- Naan Vanangum Deivam (1963)
- Kalai Arasi (1963)
- Lava Kusa (1963) with Ghantsala
- Aasai Alaigal (1963)
- Kulamagal Radhai (1963)
- Yarukku Sontham (1963)
- Kunkhumam (1963)
- Neethikkupin Paasam (1963)
- Ratha Thilagam (1963)
- Kaanchi Thalaivan (1963)
- Annai Illam (1963)
- Parisu (1963)
- Thulasi Maadam (1963)
- Ninaipadharku Neramillai (1963)
- Ezhai Pangalan (1963)
- Kaithiyin Kathali (1963)
- Puratshi Veeran Pulithevan (1963)
- Vettaikkaran (1964)
- Alli (1964)
- Vazhi Piranthadu (1964)
- Thozhilali (1964)
- Navarathri (1964)
- Ullasa Payanam (1964)
- Aayiram Roobai (1964)
- Paditha Manaivi (1965)
- Kaakum Karangal (1965)
- Thiruvilaiyadal (1965)
- Veera Abhimanyu (1965)
- Idhaya Kamalam (1965)
- Kanni Thai (1965)
- Enga Veettu Penn (1965)
- Thazhampoo (1965)
- Muharasi (1966)
- Annavin Aasai (1966)
- Thedi Vandha Thirumagal (1966)
- Mahakavi Kalidas (1966)
- Thaaye Unakkaga (1966)
- Thaali Bhagyam (1966)
- Chinnanchiru Ulagam (1966)
- Saraswathi Sabatham (1966)
- Thanippiravi (1966)
- Selvam (1966)
- Thaikku Thalaimagan (1967)
- Kandhan Karunai (1967)
- Penne Nee Vaazhga (1967)
- Thanga Thambi (1967)
- Pesum Deivam (1967)
- Arasa Kattalai (1967)
- Paaladai (1967)
- Seetha (1967)
- Thiruvarutchelvar (1967)
- Ponnana Vazhvu (1967)
- Kan Kanda Deivam (1967)
- Rajathi (1967)
- Muhurtha Naal (1967)
- Vivasayi (1967)
- Panama Pasama (1968)
- Thirumal Perumai (1968)
- Thanga Valayal (1968)
- Ther Thiruvizha (1968)
- Harichandra (1968)
- Andru Kanda Mugam (1968)
- Deiveega Uravu (1968)
- Thillana Mohanambal (1968)
- Delhi Mapillai (1968)
- Jeevanamsam (1968)
- Kadhal Vaaganam (1968)
- Adimaippenn (1969)
- Ethiroli (1969)
- Athiparasakthi (1971)
- Irulum Oliyum (1971)
- Thirumagal (1971)
- Vasantha Maligai (1972)
- Kurathi Magan (1972)
- Nalla Neram (1972)
- Pattikaattu Ponnaiya (1972)
- Engal Thanga Raja (1973)
- Vani Rani (1974)
- Netru Indru Naalai (1974) - 1 song
- Anbu Thangai (1974)
- Satyam (1975)
- Ellaikkodu (1974)
- Pallandu Vazhga (1975)
- Uthaman (1976)
- Enippadigal (1979)
- Gnana Kuzhandhai (1979)
- Manmatha Radhangal (1980)
- Kadhal Kiligal (1981)
- Antha Rathirikku Satchi Illai (1982)
- Thoongatha Kannindru Ondru (1982)
- Simma Soppanam (1984)
- Mel Maruvathoor Aadhiparasakthi (1985)
- Mel Maruvathoor Arpudhangal (1986)
- Paimara Kappal (1988)
- Orey Thaai Orey Kulam (1988)
- Mahamayi (1991)

=== Telugu ===
- Manchi Manasulu (1962)
- Dagudu Moothalu (1964)
- Mooga Manasulu (1964)
- Antastulu (1965)
- Aastiparulu (1966)
- Kanchu Kota (1967)
- Manushulu Marali (1969)
- Akka Chellelu (1970)
- Mallee Pelli (1970)
- Iddaru Ammayilu (1970)
- Balaraju Katha (1970)
- Anuradha (1971)
- Dasara Bullodu (1971)
- Prem Nagar (1971)
- Inspector Bharya (1972)
- Badi Panthulu (1972)
- Bangaru Babu (1973)
- Andala Ramudu (1973)
- Mayadari Malligadu (1973)
- Mutyala Muggu (1975)
- Siri Siri Muvva (1976)
- Monagadu (1976)
- Adavi Ramudu (1977)
- Indradhanussu (1978)
- Mana Voori Pandavulu (1978)
- Kalanthakulu (1978)
- Srungara Ramudu (1979)
- Mande Gundelu (1979)
- Sankarabharanam (1979)
- Gorintaku (1979 film) (1979)
- Vamsa Vruksham (1980)
- Subhodhayam (1980)
- Aadavaallu Meeku Joharlu (1981)
- Saptapadi (1981)
- Agni Poolu (1981)
- Golconda Abbulu (1982)
- Subhalekha (1982)
- Kaliyuga Ramudu (1982)
- Trisulam (1982)
- Kanchana Ganga (1984)
- Siksha (1985)
- Sirivennela (1986)
- Sruthilayalu (1987)
- Srinivasa Kalyanam (1987)
- Janaki Ramudu (1988)
- Sutradharulu (1989)
- Adavilo Abhimanyudu (1989)
- Muddula Mavayya (1989)
- Pralayam (1990)
- Nari Nari Naduma Murari (1990)
- Alludugaru (1990)
- Assembly Rowdy (1991)
- Pelli Pustakam (1991)
- Swathi Kiranam (1992)
- Srinatha Kavi Sarvabhowmudu (1993)
- Bobbili Bullodu (1996)

=== Malayalam ===
- Nairu Pidicha Pulivalu (1958) – Background Score only
- Aana Valarthiya Vanampadiyude Makan (1971)
- Padmatheertham(1978)
- Kayalum Kayarum (1979)
- Enne Snehikkoo Enne Maathram (1981)
- Kakka (1982)
- Piriyilla Naam (1984)
- Vepraalam (1984)
- Rangam (1985)
- Mangalya Charthu (1987)

=== Kannada ===
- Manini (1979)
- Guru Shishyaru (1981)
- Krishna Rukmini (1988)
- Shabarimale Swamy Ayyappa (1990)
- Pedda Gedda (1981)

=== Playback Singer ===
Year	Film	Language	Song	Co-singer	Music
1952	Kumari	Tamil	Aanukkoru Penn Venumey		K. V. Mahadevan
1953	Madana Mohini	Tamil	Unmaikke Ulagil Uyarvuthaan Illaiye		K. V. Mahadevan
1953	Madana Mohini	Tamil	Peru Sollum Pillai Illaiye	G. Kasthoori	K. V. Mahadevan
1953	Madana Mohini	Tamil	Vaazhiya Senthamizh Thaaye		K. V. Mahadevan
1953	Madana Mohini	Tamil	Kannodu Kannaayi Rahasiyam Pesi	P. Leela	K. V. Mahadevan
1953	Naalvar	Tamil	Abaraadham Roobaa Aimbadhu	K. Rani	K. V. Mahadevan
1953	Naalvar	Tamil	Lavukku Lavukku Love	K. Rani	K. V. Mahadevan
1954	Koondukkili	Tamil	Raatthirikku Boovaavukku Laatteri	T. M. Soundararajan & V. N. Sundharam	K. V. Mahadevan
1955	Asai Anna Arumai Thambi	Tamil	Pozhaikkum Vazhiyai Paaru	Thodi Kannan, S. C. Krishnan, P. Susheela, Udutha Sarojini & Padma	K. V. Mahadevan
1955	Asai Anna Arumai Thambi	Tamil	Kaanaadha Kaatchigalai Paaru	K. Rani	K. V. Mahadevan

== Awards ==
- National Film Award for Best Music Direction (1967) for Kandan Karunai (first recipient of the award)
- Tamil Nadu State Film Award for Best Music Director (1969) for Adimai Penn
- National Film Award for Best Music Direction (1980) for Sankarabharanam
- Nandi Award for Best Music Director (1980) for Sankarabharanam
- Nandi Award for Best Music Director (1987) for Shrutilayalu
- Nandi Award for Best Music Director (1991) for Manjeera Nadam
- Filmfare Best Music Director Award (Telugu) (1992) for Swathi Kiranam

== Personal life ==
K.V.Mahadevan, at the time of his death, was survived by his wife, two sons and three daughters. The famous son being V. Mahadevan, whose debut role was that of a judge in the Tamil film Maasilamani.

== Death ==
K.V. Mahadevan died on 21 June 2001 in Chennai when he was 83.
