= Mani Osai =

- Theatrical release poster
- Directed by: P. Madhavan
- Written by: Pasumani
- Produced by: A. L. Srinivasan
- Starring: Kalyan Kumar; M. R. Radha; R. Muthuraman; C. R. Vijayakumari; Kumari Rukmini
- Cinematography: M. Karnan
- Edited by: R. Devarajan
- Music by: Viswanathan–Ramamoorthy
- Production company: ALS Productions
- Release date: 12 January 1963
- Running time: 168 minutes
- Country: India
- Language: Tamil

Mani Osai (transl. Bell Sound) is a 1963 Indian Tamil-language drama film, directed by P. Madhavan, in his directorial debut. The film was produced by A. L. Srinivasan under ALS Productions and written by Pasumani. It was inspired by Victor Hugo's French novel, The Hunchback of Notre-Dame, and stars Kalyan Kumar, M. R. Radha, R. Muthuraman, C. R. Vijayakumari, V. Nagayya, Nagesh, Pushpalatha and Kumari Rukmani. Viswanathan–Ramamoorthy composed the music for the film.

== Cast ==
- Kalyan Kumar
- M. R. Radha
- R. Muthuraman
- C. R. Vijayakumari
- Pushpalatha
- Kumari Rukmani
- V. Nagayya
- M. S. S. Bhagyam
- Nagesh
- Pushpamala
- "Baby" Chandrakala

== Production ==
Mani Osai is the directorial debut of P. Madhavan, and was inspired by French writer Victor Hugo's 1831 novel, The Hunchback of Notre-Dame. It was produced by A. L. Srinivasan under his company A. L. Productions.

== Release and reception ==
Mani Osai was released on 12 January 1963. Kalki printed a positive review. The film did not perform well at the box office; according to film historian Randor Guy, this was due to its lack of a handsome hero.

== Soundtrack ==
The music was composed by Viswanathan–Ramamoorthy, with lyrics by Kannadasan. Some of the film's songs, such as "Payuthu Paayuthu", "Devan Kovil Mani Osai" and "Aattukkutti Aattukkutti Mammavai" became popular.

Song	Singer	Length
"Paayuthu Paayuthu"	P. Susheela L. R. Eswari	05:04
"Aattukkutti Aattukutti"	L. R. Eswari	04:10
"Devan Kovil Mani Osai"	Sirkazhi Govindarajan	04:52
"Katti Thangam Rajavukku"	K. Jamuna Rani, L. R. Eswari	04.32
"Varusham Maasam Thedi"	S. Janaki	04:35
"Varusham Maasam" (Sad)	P. Susheela	02:48
"Varusham Ponne"		03:41
