= M. R. Radha =

Indian actor and politician (1907-1979)

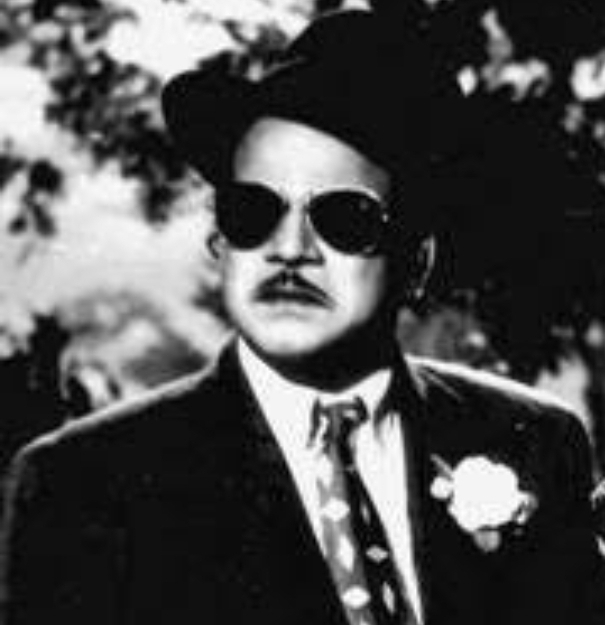
- Radha seen in Ratha Kanneer
- Born: Madras Rajagopalan Radhakrishnan; 14 April 1907; Madras, Madras Presidency, British India (present-day Chennai, Tamil Nadu, India)
- Died: 17 September 1979 (aged 72); Tiruchirappalli, Tamil Nadu, India
- Other name: Nadigavel
- Occupations: Actor; politician
- Years active: 1937-1979
- Spouses: Saraswathi; Dhanalakshmi; Geetha
- Children: 12 (including M. R. R. Vasu, Radha Ravi, Radhika and Nirosha)
- Family: Radha family

Madras Rajagopalan Radhakrishnan (14 April 1907 – 17 September 1979), better known as M. R. Radha, was an Indian actor and politician active in Tamil plays and films. He was given the title "Nadigavel" (King of Acting) by Pattukkottai Alagiri for his versatile acting. He mostly played villain roles, but had also acted in several films as comedian.

== Career ==
Madras Rajagopalan Radhakrishnan was born on 14 April 1907 at Chintadripet, a locality in Chennai (then Madras), Tamil Nadu into a Telugu speaking family. Radha left his home at an early age due to a quarrel with his mother in which she declined to give an extra piece of fish to eat.

Radha was a popular theatre artiste who performed in more than 5000 stage shows. Starting at the age of 10, he appeared at first in small roles and eventually grew to a level that stories for dramas were custom-made for him.

Radha gained popularity with the success of his stage play Ratha Kanneer. His performance in the 1954 film version of the play, directed by Krishnan–Panju, brought wider recognition of his talents and made him a household name in Tamil Nadu.

Radha played both villain roles and comedic roles. In the 1960s, roles were specially written for him, and he often played the villain to actors like M.G. Ramachandran and Sivaji Ganesan.

== Political Life ==
Although there were some professional conflicts with E.V. Ramasamy in the beginning, later he was greatly attracted by his principles and became a prominent supporter of the Dravidar Kazhagam. While being a personal friend of Kamaraj, he campaigned for him during elections when E.V. Ramasamy supported the Congress. Due to his political leanings and profession, he had differences of opinion with M.G.R.

He extensively propagated his reformist ideas, anti-Brahministic views, and Dravidian movement concepts through his plays and films. Despite this, even his opponents appreciated his acting.

The Madras Provincial Legislative Assembly introduced a new law specifically to ban plays in response to Radha's "Ramayanam" play. When the debate for this law was taking place, Radha went to the legislature. The assembly members opposed this, but Radha insisted that he should necessarily witness the debate since the law was being created specifically for him.

When Periyar announced that a hall would be opened in the name of Radha who had once proclaimed 'Don't build fan clubs for actors,' Radha shyly declined the honor. In 1963, while inaugurating the Radha Mandram (Radha Hall) at Periyar Thidal, Periyar remarked in his speech, 'I am inaugurating this hall only so that other actors might gain some wisdom.

== M. G. Ramachandran shooting incident ==
Radha In his later years

On 12 January 1967, Radha and producer K.N. Vasu of Muthukumaran Pictures visited the actor and politician M. G. Ramachandran at his home to talk about a future project. During the conversation, Radha suddenly got up from his chair and shot twice at Ramachandran's left ear. Both bullets got lodged in Ramachandran's neck. Radha then turned the gun on himself and tried to shoot himself, but the bullet just scratched his right temple. Radha and Ramachandran were admitted to the Government General Hospital, Chennai, where they survived after proper treatment. The only eyewitness for the shooting was Vasu.

In the assassination trial, held at Saithapet First Division Magistrate Court under Magistrate S. Kuppusami in May 1967, and later at the Chingleput Sessions Court held under Justice P. Lakshmanan, Radha was represented by eminent criminal attorney N. T. Vanamamalai. The verdict was delivered on 4 November 1967. As majority of the evidences were against Radha, he was sentenced to a seven-year term. At the High Court hearing, considering his age, the sentence was reduced to four years and three months.

== Death ==
After being released from jail, Radha died of jaundice on 17 September 1979 aged 72 at his residence in Thiruchirappalli. His popularity had improved and his funeral procession was one of the largest in South India, as over 200,000 mourners paid respect.

== Personal life ==
Although Radha acted in Tamil movies, he is of Telugu descent and his family's roots can be traced back to Andhra Pradesh. He was married three times, with the marriages occurring concurrently. His wives were named Saraswathi, Dhanalakshmi and Geetha. He was the father of 12 children by his three wives. His four sons were M. R. R. Vasu, M. R. Radha Ravi, Raju and Mohan. Also had eight daughters including Rashya, Rani, Rathikala, Ganavalli, Kasturi, Rajeswari, Radhika Sarathkumar and Nirosha. His first son Vasu was a leading character artist until the mid-1980s. His other son Radha Ravi is also an actor. Radhika is an actress and producer and is married to actor R. Sarathkumar. Nirosha (also known as Niroja) is an actress working mostly in supporting roles; she is married to actor Ramki.

== Filmography ==
This is a partial filmography. You can expand it.

=== 1930s ===
| Year | Film | Role | Ref. |
|---|---|---|---|
| 1937 | Rajasekaran Emantha Sonagiri | | Debut Movie |
| 1939 | Santhana Devan | | |

=== 1940s ===
| Year | Film | Role | Ref. |
|---|---|---|---|
| 1940 | Satyavaani | | |

=== 1950s ===
| Year | Film | Role | Ref. |
|---|---|---|---|
| 1954 | Ratha Kanneer | Mohan | |
| 1958 | Nalla Idathu Sammandham | Muthu | |
| 1959 | Ulagam Sirikkirathu | Jagadeesan | |
| 1959 | Thamarai Kulam | | |
| 1959 | Bhaaga Pirivinai | Singaram | |

=== 1960s ===
| Year | Film | Role | Ref. |
|---|---|---|---|
| 1960 | Aadavantha Deivam | Malaiyappan | |
| 1960 | Rathinapuri Ilavarasi | | |
| 1960 | Ondrupattal Undu Vazhvu | | |
| 1960 | Kadavulin Kuzhandhai | | |
| 1960 | Kavalai Illaadha Manithan | Manickam | |
| 1960 | Kairasi | Kumar | |
| 1961 | Paava Mannippu | Aalavandhar | |
| 1961 | Kongunattu Thangam | | |
| 1961 | Sabaash Mapillai | | |
| 1961 | Kumudham | | |
| 1961 | Nallavan Vazhvan | Nalasivam | |
| 1961 | Paalum Pazhamum | | |
| 1961 | Panam Panthiyile | | |
| 1961 | Thaai Sollai Thattadhe | | |
| 1961 | Pangaaligal | | |
| 1962 | Naagamalai Azhagi | | |
| 1962 | Pattinathar | | |
| 1962 | Mangaiyar Ullam Mangatha Selvam | | |
| 1962 | Madappura | | |
| 1962 | Sarada | | |
| 1962 | Valar Pirai | | |
| 1962 | Thayai Katha Thanayan | | |
| 1962 | Ethaiyum Thangum Ithaiyam | | |
| 1962 | Ellorum Vazhavendum | Guest Appearance | |
| 1962 | Padithal Mattum Podhuma | Kailasam | |
| 1962 | Bale Pandiya | Kabali and Amirthalingam Pillai | |
| 1962 | Kannadi Maaligai | | |
| 1962 | Paadha Kaanikkai | | |
| 1962 | Mahaveera Bheeman | Guest Appearance | |
| 1962 | Kudumba Thalaivan | Velayudam Pilai | |
| 1962 | Kathiruntha Kangal | | |
| 1962 | Paasam | | |
| 1962 | Kavitha | | |
| 1962 | Thendral Veesum | | |
| 1962 | Indira En Selvam | | |
| 1962 | Muthu Mandapam | | |
| 1962 | Sengamala Theevu | | |
| 1962 | Aalayamani | Aatkondan Pillai | |
| 1963 | Kadavulai Kanden | | |
| 1963 | Koduthu Vaithaval | | |
| 1963 | Dharmam Thalai Kaakkum | Sadanandam | |
| 1963 | Iruvar Ullam | Gnana Sigamani | |
| 1963 | Kattu Roja | | |
| 1963 | Mani Osai | | |
| 1963 | Lava Kusa | Guest Appearance | |
| 1963 | Periya Idathu Penn | Kailasam Pillai | |
| 1963 | Aasai Alaigal | | |
| 1963 | Naanum Oru Penn | | |
| 1963 | Idhayathil Nee | | |
| 1963 | Anandha Jodhi | Punniya Kodi | |
| 1963 | Paar Magaley Paar | Nataraj | |
| 1963 | Neethikkupin Paasam | | |
| 1963 | Kalyaniyin Kanavan | | |
| 1963 | Kaanchi Thalaivan | PooVikraman | |
| 1963 | Karpagam | Thandavam | |
| 1963 | Parisu | | |
| 1963 | Puratshi Veeran Pulithevan | | |
| 1964 | Vettaikkaran | Sundaram | |
| 1964 | Pasamum Nesamum | | |
| 1964 | En Kadamai | Tharumalingam | |
| 1964 | Pachchai Vilakku | Rajabaadhar | |
| 1964 | Kai Kodutha Deivam | Keady Varathan | |
| 1964 | Magaley Un Samathu | | |
| 1964 | Arunagirinathar | | |
| 1964 | Vazhi Piranthadu | | |
| 1964 | Puthiya Paravai | Rangan | |
| 1964 | Ullasa Payanam | | |
| 1964 | Aayiram Roobai | | |
| 1964 | Bobbili Yuddham | Hyder Jung | |
| 1964 | Thaayin Madiyil | | |
| 1965 | Pazhani | Kalyanam | |
| 1965 | Santhi | Paramasivam Pillai | |
| 1965 | Hello Mister Zamindar | Azhagirisamy | |
| 1965 | Paditha Manaivi | | |
| 1965 | Sarasa B.A. | | |
| 1965 | Vazhikatti | | |
| 1965 | Enga Veettu Penn | | |
| 1965 | Thazhampoo | | |
| 1965 | Anandhi | | |
| 1966 | Chitthi | Periyasami Pillai | |
| 1966 | Chandrodayam | Duryodhanan | |
| 1966 | Petralthan Pillaiya | Kabali | |

=== 1970s ===
| Year | Film | Role | Notes |
|---|---|---|---|
| 1974 | Samaiyalkaran | | |
| 1976 | Dasavatharam | Hiranya Kashipu | |
| 1978 | Panchabootham | | |
| 1978 | Vandikkaran Magan | | |
| 1978 | Taxi Driver | | |
| 1978 | Mela Thalangal | | |
| 1979 | Velum Mayilum Thunai | Velayudham/Thanikachalam | |

=== 1980s ===
| Year | Film | Role | Notes |
|---|---|---|---|
| 1980 | Saranam Ayyappa | | |
| 1980 | Naan Potta Savaal | Arthanari | |
