= Kaithiyin Kathali =

- Poster
- Directed by: A. K. Velan
- Written by: A. K. Velan
- Produced by: A. K. Velan
- Starring: S. S. Rajendran; R. Vijayakumari; S. A. Ashokan
- Cinematography: V. Ramamurthi
- Edited by: V. P. Natarajan
- Music by: K. V. Mahadevan
- Production company: Arunachalam Pictures
- Release date: 25 December 1963
- Running time: 3,508 meters (11,509 ft)
- Country: India
- Language: Tamil

Kaithiyin Kathali (transl. Prisoner's Lover girl) is a 1963 Indian Tamil-language crime drama film directed by A. K. Velan. The film stars S. S. Rajendran and R. Vijayakumari. It was released on 25 December 1963.

== Plot ==
Azhagiri is a poor man. Due to circumstances he robs but is caught and sent to prison. His mother dies and his sister is orphaned. A man tries to molest her but another person who is a secret police officer rescues and marries her. Azhagiri, who did not know what happened, gets released and searches for his mother and sister. Unable to find them, he plans to rob again. However a pannaiyar (landed proprietor) helps and employs him in his farm. Azhagiri becomes the leader of the workers. In the process, he meets a girl and falls in love with her. Pannaiyar does not like these developments. He sends the girl into hiding. Azhagiri searches for his girlfriend and finds her. But it turns out that she is not his girlfriend but is her twin sister. What happens next forms the rest of the story.

== Cast ==
The list is adapted from the book Thiraikalanjiyam Part 2

Male cast

- S. S. Rajendran
- S. A. Ashokan
- P. S. Thedchanamoorthy
- P. S. Veerasamy

Male cast (contd.)

- O. A. K. Thevar
- T. V. Narayanasamy
- Pakkirisamy
- Seetharaman

Female cast

- R. Vijayakumari
- L. Vijayalakshmi
- K. N. Kamalam

== Production ==
The film was produced by A. K. Velan under his own banner Arunachalam Studios. He also wrote the story and dialogues and directed the film. Cinematography was done by V. Ramamurthi while the editing was done by V. P. Natarajan. K. P. Muthu was in charge of art direction and P. S. Gopalakrishnan handled the choreography. Still photography was done by Thiruchi K. Arunachalam. The film was shot at Arunachalam Studios and was processed at AVM Studio.

== Soundtrack ==
Music was composed by K. V. Mahadevan. A lyric penned by Mahakavi Subbramania Bharathiyar was also included in the film.

Song	Singer/s	Lyricist	Length
"Udhaya Sooriyan Valarndhu Vandhaan"	M. S. Rajeswari	Thanjai N. Ramaiah Dass	03:19
"Chithira Poongodi Thendralai Marandhu"	A. L. Raghavan & Soolamangalam Rajalakshmi	Kannadasan	03:52
"Thaaye Ninnai Sila Varangal Ketten"	P. Susheela	Mahakavi Subbramania Bharathiyar	02:52
"Raajaavum Vandhiduvaar"	P. Susheela	A. Maruthakasi	2:59
"Vandhu Vandhu Ovvonnaa Poguthe"	T. M. Soundararajan	A. Maruthakasi	03:57
"Maargazhi Pochchu Thai Poranthaachu"	T. M. Soundararajan & P. Susheela	A. Maruthakasi	2:56
"Singaara Malligai Maruvu"	L. R. Eswari	A. Maruthakasi	02:43
