= Satyam (1976 film) =

- Theatrical release poster
- Directed by: S. A. Kannan
- Screenplay by: Vietnam Veedu Sundaram
- Based on: Vidhi by S. A. Kannan
- Produced by: P. M. Shanmugam; G. M. Mani
- Starring: Sivaji Ganesan; Devika; Kamal Haasan; Manjula; Jayachitra
- Cinematography: K. S. Prasad
- Edited by: R. Devarajan
- Music by: K. V. Mahadevan
- Production company: Sri Shanmugamani Films
- Release date: 6 May 1976
- Running time: 138 minutes
- Country: India
- Language: Tamil

Satyam (transl. The Truth) is a 1976 Indian Tamil-language film, directed by S. A. Kannan and written by Vietnam Veedu Sundaram. The film stars Sivaji Ganesan, Kamal Haasan, Manjula, Devika and Jayachitra. The film has Haasan playing the younger brother of Ganesan. It was adapted from Kannan's play Vidhi. The film was released on 6 May 1976.

== Plot ==
Dharmalingam, the chieftain of his village, is known for keeping his word and his pacifism. His wife Sivakami, educated brother Kumaran and Kumaran's betrothed, Vani, live together happily. Gowri, Kumaran's college mate who also happens to be the richest woman in the village falls in love with Kumaran.

Sokkanathan is Gowri's guardian and a classist, who wants to keep the poor poor so that they stay under his thumb. Due to his machinations, the poor villagers' houses get burnt. Seeing Dharmalingan's plight and tears, Gowri promises to rebuild their houses and give them the lands she has in excess much to the chagrin of Sokkanathan. She even fires Sokkanathan as her agent upon her eighteenth birthday, leaving him rudderless. Due to her beneficent nature, Dharmalingan gives her a carte blanch word that she can ask anything she wants at any time which he will give her so long it is in his power. She uses this to her advantage and asks for Kumaran. After a huge showdown, Kumaran succumbs to pressure and marries Gowri deciding to punish his own brother and Gowri.

He takes back everything Gowri has given and refuses to even see his brother. Vani meanwhile has taken up ascetism and starts living in temple. Kumaran gets into a major accident which causes everyone to gather together, and, in the end, Vani fasts to death praying to God which helps Kumaran survive at the cost of Vani's life.

== Cast ==
- Sivaji Ganesan as Dharmalingam Devar
- Devika as Sivakami
- Kamal Haasan as Kumaran
- Manjula as Gowri
- Jayachitra as Vani
- M. N. Nambiar as Sokkanathan
- S. V. Subbaiah as Pattalathu Thatha
- Major Sundarrajan as Police Inspector
- V. K. Ramasamy as Vallinayagam
- Nagesh as Ambi
- K. K. Soundar as a villager
- Karuppu Subbiah as a villager
- T. K. S. Natarajan as a villager
- Typist Gopu as Iyer
- Neelu as Iyer
- Usilai Mani as Iyer
- Comedy Shanmuagam as Iyer
- Aalam as a Dancer
- Pushpamala

== Production ==
Satyam was an adaptation of the play Vidhi. The play was written by S. A. Kannan who directed the film adaptation. Kamal Haasan was paired with Manjula which remained their only collaboration in their career. The film was announced in 1973.

== Soundtrack ==
The soundtrack was composed by K. V. Mahadevan and lyrics were written by Kannadasan. The song "Kalyana Kovilil" attained popularity.

Track listing
No.	Title	Lyrics	Singer(s)	Length
1.	"Kalyana Kovilil"	Kannadasan	S. P. Balasubrahmanyam, P. Susheela
2.	"Azhagam Kodi"	Kannadasan	S. P. Balasubramanyam, P. Susheela
3.	"Kalyana Kovilil" (sad)	Kannadasan	P. Susheela
4.	"Pottane Oru"	Kannadasan	T. M. Soundararajan, P. Susheela, S. P. Balasubrahmanyam
5.	"Amma Mel Aanayittu"

== Reception ==
Kanthan of Kalki wrote the screenplay, which was proceeding smoothly and calmly till the interval, then reaches the fate of a ship battered by a storm; what saves the film from this accident is the unparalleled performance of the actors and actresses. Naagai Dharuman of Navamani praised the acting, dialogues, cinematography and direction.
