= Aayiram Roobai =

1964 film by K. S. Gopalakrishnan

- Film poster
- Directed by: K. S. Gopalakrishnan
- Written by: K. S. Gopalakrishnan
- Produced by: Chinna Annamalai
- Starring: Gemini Ganesan; Savitri Ganesh
- Cinematography: M. Karnan
- Edited by: R. Devarajan
- Music by: K. V. Mahadevan
- Production company: Kalachithra
- Release date: 3 December 1964
- Running time: 130 minutes
- Country: India
- Language: Tamil

Aayiram Roobai (transl. Thousand Rupees) is 1964 Indian Tamil-language film, directed and written by K. S. Gopalakrishnan. It stars Gemini Ganesan and Savitri Ganesh. The film was released on 3 December 1964.

== Cast ==
- Gemini Ganesan
- Savitri Ganesh
- M. R. Radha
- C. K. Nagesh
- S. A. Ashokan
- S. V. Sahasranamam
- Kottapuli Jayaraman
- Master Babu
- Ragini
- Mohana
- Nalini
- Baby Savitri
- Veerappan
- Karikol Raju
- Gemini Balu
- Vellai Subbaiah

== Soundtrack ==
Music was by K. V. Mahadevan.

Song	Singer	Lyrics	Length
"Amma Illae Appa"	S. Janaki	Vaali	03:25
"Aanaakka Antha Madam"	P. Susheela	A. Maruthakasi	03:19
"Parpodi Kalnaar Parpodi"	P. B. Srinivas, P. Susheela	A. Maruthakasi	03:52
"Paarthaalum Paarthen Naan"	P. B. Srinivas, P. Susheela	Kannadasan	03:30
"Nilavukkum Nizhal Undu"	P. Susheela	Kannadasan	03:27

== Release and reception ==
Aayiram Roobai was released on 3 December 1964, delayed from a 3 November (Diwali) release. On 12 December 1964, The Indian Express stated, "A crude and twisted adaptation of the Million Pound Note, Aayiram Roopai contains precious little that is commendable. The Aayiram Roopai note in the film is counterfeit, so also the entertainment it doles out". S. V. Kannan, writing for Kalki, said Savitri carried the film on her shoulders.
