= Amudha =

- Poster
- Directed by: K. Venkatraman
- Written by: Mara. Tamilselvan
- Produced by: M. A. Rahman; K. Babu
- Starring: Ravichandran; R. Muthuraman; C. R. Vijayakumari; Rajasree; Nagesh
- Cinematography: S. V. Srikanth
- Edited by: R. Shanmugam
- Music by: M. S. Viswanathan
- Production company: Sri Poongavanathal Pictures
- Release date: 2 November 1975
- Country: India
- Language: Tamil

Amudha (transl. Elixir) is a 1975 Indian Tamil-language film directed by K. Venkatraman in his debut and written by Mara. Tamilselvan. The film stars Ravichandran, R. Muthuraman, C. R. Vijayakumari, Rajasree and Nagesh. It began production in 1969, but was released on 2 November 1975.

== Cast ==
- Ravichandran as Vasanth
- R. Muthuraman as Kumar
- C. R. Vijayakumari as Amudha
- Rajasree as Anbarasi
- Nagesh
- Major Sundarrajan
- V. S. Raghavan
- S. V. Ramadas as Chandran

== Production ==
Amudha is the directorial debut of Venkatraman. The film began production in 1969, and was almost completed but halted due to the producer M. A. Rahman's financial troubles. A few years later, when production resumed, lead actor Ravichandran's market value was declining, and Vijayakumari was by now only playing character roles. Whereas Muthuraman's role was originally secondary, it was decided to shift the focus to him, and Rajasree's market value had declined. Rahman met Muktha Srinivasan for help, who called the film's music composer M. S. Viswanathan. Viswanathan composed a tune and asked the film's lyricist Kannadasan to write lyrics. Kannadasan did so, and the song was "Anbe Amudha". Both men did not accept payment for the song's composition and writing. The song became immensely popular, and was frequently played on Radio Ceylon. Because of this, Rahman decided to release the film. It became a major success mainly due to the success of that song, and paid off Rahman's debts.

== Soundtrack ==
The music was composed by M. S. Viswanathan.

Track listing
No.	Title	Singer(s)	Length
1.	"Maalai Mayakkathil"	L. R. Eswari
2.	"Anbe Amudhe"	T. M. Soundararajan

== See also ==
- List of films with the longest production time
