= Thaaye Unakkaga =

1966 film by P. Pullaiah

- Theatrical release poster
- Directed by: P. Pullaiya
- Screenplay by: Kannadasan
- Story by: Kannadasan
- Based on: Ballad of a Soldier
- Produced by: R. M. Kannappan
- Starring: See "Cast"
- Music by: K. V. Mahadevan
- Production company: Sri Kamalaalayam
- Distributed by: Sembi
- Release date: 26 August 1966
- Country: India
- Language: Tamil

Thaaye Unakkaga (transl. Mother, for you only) is a 1966 Indian Tamil-language film directed by P. Pullayya and written by Kannadasan. The film has an ensemble cast. It is a remake of the 1959 Russian film Ballad of a Soldier. The film was released on 26 August 1966.

== Plot ==
A single mom awaits her son in their Nilgiri mountains village, as her young son is on the war front in the Himalayas. The Jawan, Raju gets a letter from his mom wanting to meet him. He faces various challenges as he embarks on the journey from the Kashmir to the Nilgiris. Whether hs is able to meet his mom forms the climax of the movie

== Cast ==
- Sivaji Ganesan as Captain Swamy
- Sivakumar as Major Raju
- S. S. Rajendran as Commendar Raghu
- Muthuraman as Johnson
- Nagesh as Neelu
- Padmini as Devi
- C. R. Vijayakumari as Lakshmi
- Devika as Reetta
- J. Jayalalithaa as Komala
- Santha Kumari as Thaayaramma
- Vijayakumar as Major George Reetta’s Fiancée
- V. K. Ramasamy as Aarumugam
- Ennathe Kannaiah as Kannaiya
- Pushpalatha as Radha, Raju’s Fiancée
- C. K. Saraswathi as Paravatham
- R. S. Manohar as Rajankam
- Major Sundarrajan as Victor Irudhayaraj
- Ramadas as Military Soldiger
- Kuladeivam Rajagopal as Ranga
- Manorama as Padma
- Kumari Sachu as Dancer
- Comedy Shanmugam as Village People

== Production ==
After watching the 1959 Russian film Ballad of a Soldier at the International Film Festival in Madras, Kannadasan wanted to remake it in Tamil. The dialogues were written by A. L. Narayanan.

== Soundtrack ==
Soundtrack was composed by K. V. Mahadevan and lyrics written by Kannadasan.

Track listing
No.	Title	Singer(s)	Length
1.	"Oru Kodi Padalukkum"	Sirkazhi Govindarajan
2.	"Poonthendral Isai"	P. B. Sreenivas
3.	"Yesunathar Pesinaal"	B. Vasantha
4.	"Amaidhi Purave"	P. Susheela
5.	"Kaveriyil Thames"	L. R. Eswari
6.	"Jinukku Jinukku"	K. Jamuna Rani
7.	"Karuneela Mazhai"	Sirkazhi Govindarajan
8.	"Pazhagu Senthamizh"	Sirkazhi Govindarajan
