= Anandhi (film) =

- Theatrical release poster
- Directed by: P. Neelakantan
- Written by: M. S. Solaimuthu
- Produced by: A. L. Srinivasan
- Starring: S. S. Rajendran; C. R. Vijayakumari
- Cinematography: M. Karnan
- Edited by: R. Devarajan
- Music by: M. S. Viswanathan
- Production company: ALS Productions
- Release date: 25 December 1965
- Running time: 145 minutes
- Country: India
- Language: Tamil

Anandhi (/ɑːnənði/) is a 1965 Indian Tamil-language drama film, directed by P. Neelakantan, and written by M. S. Solaimuthu. The film stars S. S. Rajendran and C. R. Vijayakumari, with M. R. Radha, M. N. Nambiar, Nagesh, Manorama, S. V. Sahasranamam V. K. Ramasamy and Manimala playing supporting roles. It was released on 27 December 1965, and performed averagely.

== Cast ==
- S. S. Rajendran as Somu
- C. R. Vijayakumari as Anandhi
- M. R. Radha as Ambalavaanan
- Nagesh as Thambi Durai
- M. N. Nambiar as Nithyanandham
- Manorama as Manoranjitham
- V. K. Ramasamy as Masilamani
- S. V. Sahasranamam as Dharmalingam
- Manimala as Sivakami
- Udaya Chandrika as Dancer

== Soundtrack ==
Music was composed by M. S. Viswanathan and the lyrics were written by Kannadasan. The song "Kannilae Anbirundhal" is set to the raga Bilaskhani Todi.

Songs	Singers	Length
"Kannilae Anbirundhal" (F)	P. Susheela	4:04
"Kannilae Anbirundhal" (M)	T. M. Soundararajan	3:54
"Unnai Aadaindha Manam"	P. Susheela	3:18
"Sorgathilirundhu Naragam"	T. M. Soundararajan, P. Susheela	3:45
"Vedikaiya Pozhuthu Poganum"	T. M. Soundararajan, A. L. Raghavan	3:01
"Kuluradikuthu"	T. M. Soundararajan, L. R. Eswari	
