= Teacheramma =

1968 film by Puttanna Kanagal

- Poster
- Directed by: Puttanna Kanagal
- Written by: Balamurugan
- Starring: Jaishankar; Vijayakumari; Vanisri
- Music by: T. R. Pappa
- Production company: Subhalakshmi Pictures
- Release date: 12 April 1968
- Running time: 146 minutes
- Country: India
- Language: Tamil

Teacheramma (transl. Madam Teacher) is a 1968 Indian Tamil-language drama film directed by Puttanna Kanagal. The film stars Jaishankar, Muthuraman, C. R. Vijayakumari and Vanisri. It was released on 12 April 1968 and became a success. The film was remade in Malayalam as Premashilpi (1978).

== Plot ==
A school teacher sacrifices her love for the sake of her friend.

== Cast ==
- Jaishankar as Somu
- Muthuraman as Shankar
- Nagesh as Kalimann
- Vijayakumari as Sumathi
- Vanisri as Chandra
- S. N. Lakshmi as Shankar's mother
- Baby Rani

== Soundtrack ==
The soundtrack was composed by T. R. Pappa, with lyrics by Kannadasan.

No.	Title	Singers	Length
1.	"Amma Enbathu Tamizh"	P. Susheela
2.	"Isaiyodu Deivam Vanthu"	P. Susheela
3.	"Kanavil Nindra Thirumugam"	T. M. Soundararajan
4.	"Soodikoduthaval Naan Thozhi"	P. Susheela
5.	"Vanathai Kadavul Thalaiyal"	Sirkazhi Govindarajan

== Release and reception ==
Teacheramma was released on 12 April 1968. Kalki appreciated the director for making an entertaining film without resorting to compromises such as fight or dance sequences. In the 1970s, M. G. Ramachandran – then the Chief Minister of Tamil Nadu – personally appreciated Vijayakumari for her performance. The film was commercially successful.
