= Muthu Mandapam =

- Theatrical release poster
- Directed by: A. S. A. Sami
- Written by: K. G. Radhamanalan
- Produced by: S. S. Rajendran
- Starring: S. S. Rajendran; R. Vijayakumari
- Cinematography: R. N. Pillai
- Edited by: R. Devarajan
- Music by: K. V. Mahadevan
- Production company: Rajendran Pictures
- Distributed by: Venus Movies
- Release date: 27 October 1962
- Running time: 2 hours and 43 minutes
- Country: India
- Language: Tamil

Muthu Mandapam is a 1962 Indian Tamil-language film directed by A. S. A. Sami. The film was produced by S. S. Rajendran who also stars alongside R. Vijayakumari. It was released on 27 October 1962.

== Cast ==
The following lists were compiled from the film credits (see external links) and from the database of Film News Anandan

- S. S. Rajendran
- R. Vijayakumari
- M. R. Radha
- S. V. Ranga Rao
- S. A. Asokan
- S. Rama Rao
- D. V. Narayanasamy
- S. P. Veerasamy
- K. Chandrakantha (sister of Karagattakaran famous Shamugasundaram)
- Manorama
- Shantha
- Indhira
- Bhagavathi
- Premavathi

== Production ==
The film was produced by S. S. Rajendran under his own banner Rajendran Pictures. He was also a member in Tamil Nadu Legislative Assembly at that time and his name is shown as S. S. Rajendran MLA in the film credits.

== Soundtrack ==
Music was composed by K. V. Mahadevan.

Song	Singer/s	Lyricist	Length
"Enna Solli Paaduven"	P. Susheela	Kannadasan	03:25
"Porkalam, Porkalam Kaadhalenum Porkalam"	T. M. Soundararajan & P. Susheela	Kannadasan	03:03
"Kodiyavale Poong Kodiyavale"	T. M. Soundararajan & P. Susheela	Kannadasan	04:23
"Sonnaalum Vetkamadaaa"	T. M. Soundararajan	Kannadasan	03:53
"Kanni Pennain Kaipidithu"	P. Susheela & Group	M. K. Athmanathan	03:30
