= Ther Thiruvizha =

- Theatrical release poster
- Directed by: M. A. Thirumugam
- Story by: Sandow M. M. A. Chinnappa Thevar
- Produced by: Sandow M. M. A. Chinnappa Thevar
- Starring: M. G. Ramachandran; Jayalalithaa
- Cinematography: N. S. Varma
- Edited by: M. A. Thirumugam
- Music by: K. V. Mahadevan
- Production company: Devar Films
- Release date: 23 February 1968
- Country: India
- Language: Tamil

Ther Thiruvizha (pronounced [teːɾ tiruʋiɻaː] transl. The temple car festival) is a 1968 Indian Tamil-language drama film, directed by M. A. Thirumugam. The film stars M. G. Ramachandran and Jayalalithaa. It was released on 23 February 1968.

== Plot ==
By means of his Indian coracle, Saravanan, a big-hearted boatman assures small connections and makes his living in this way. His younger sister Sivagami in fact so much. That's the way it goes, with Parvathi Ammal, their mother, that they love. When Saravanan has to gather endows her with Sivagami, he leaves his province for the neighbouring town. During his absence, a film unit led by a spirited director, Muthu, comes there looking for shooting locations. Muthu seduces Sivagami and rejects her then without arousing her suspicions, by going back to the capital. Parvathi Ammal discovers the pregnancy of her daughter Sivagami, who wants at all costs to cleanse her dishonour. She leaves for Madras to find Muthu. She meets accidentally one Valli, who is to be the beloved of Saravanan and becomes friendly (Both young ladies, on the other hand, do not know that they are sisters-in-law due to Saravanan). Valli, when to her, a saleswoman of lassi, with the well dipped character, had to resolve to avoid the ceaseless and more and more indecent harassment of her maternal uncle Somu, a gallows bird, by coming to hide in the big city. This last one also moves into the metropolis. Informed of the lot of his younger sister, Saravanan sees his mother succumbing in the confusion.

== Cast ==
- M. G. Ramachandran as Saravanan
  - Ramachandran also portrays himself in a guest role
- Nagesh as Vel
- S. A. Ashokan as Solaimulanga / Somu
- R. Muthuraman as Muthu / Ram
- Sandow M. M. A. Chinnappa Thevar as a goon
- Jayalalithaa as Valli alias Vanamalai
- C. R. Vijayakumari as Sivagami
- Manorama as Vel's wife
- Suruli Rajan as Vel's sidekick
- S. N. Lakshmi as Parvathi Ammal
- K. K. Soundar as the production manager
- Ennathe Kannaiah as the story writer
- Seetha Lakshmi as Valli's mother
- S.M.Thirupadhiswamy as the police officer
- Trichy Soundararajan as the cameraman

== Production ==
Ther Thiruvizha was shot in sixteen days. M. G. Ramachandran, besides playing the lead role of the boatman Saravanan, also made a cameo appearance as his real self presiding over a play.

== Soundtrack ==
The music was composed by K. V. Mahadevan with lyrics written by A. Maruthakasi and Mayavanathan.

| No. | Title | Singer(s) | Length |
|---|---|---|---|
| 1. | "Mazhai Muthu" | T. M. Soundararajan, P. Susheela | 3:48 |
| 2. | "Thanjavur Seemaiyile" | T.M.Soundararajan, P. Susheela | 4:28 |
| 3. | "Chithadi" | T. M. Soundararajan, P. Susheela | 3:35 |
| 4. | "Murasu Adikkatuma" | T. M. Soundararajan, P. Susheela | 3:24 |
| 5. | "YaaYaa Paaththiyaa" | P. Susheela | 2:24 |
