= Petra Maganai Vitra Annai =

- Theatrical release poster
- Directed by: V. Ramanathan
- Written by: A. P. Nagarajan; A. V. P. Aasai Thambi
- Produced by: Modern Theatres
- Starring: S. S. Rajendran; C. R. Vijayakumari; R. S. Manohar; Pandari Bai
- Cinematography: E. N. Balakrishnan
- Edited by: L. Balu
- Music by: Viswanathan–Ramamoorthy
- Production company: Modern Theatres
- Release date: 30 May 1958
- Country: India
- Language: Tamil

Petra Maganai Vitra Annai (transl. The mother who sold her son) is 1958 Indian Tamil-language film, directed by V. Ramanathan and produced by Modern Theatres. The film stars S. S. Rajendran, R. S. Manohar, A. Karunanidhi and E. R. Sahadevan, with C. R. Vijayakumari, Pandari Bai and T. P. Muthulakshmi in supporting roles. It was released on 30 May 1958.

== Cast ==
- S. S. Rajendran as Prince Villalan/Neelan
- R. S. Manohar as Minister Gunasekaran
- C. R. Vijayakumari as Jeeva
- Pandari Bai as Prince Villalan's mother
- A. Karunanidhi as Duttan
- T. P. Muthulakshmi as Mohana
- Kumari Rajamani as Nirmala
- E. R. Sahadevan as General Vikraman
- "Sattampillai" Venkatraman as Azhagesan
- Pakkirisamy as Alagalam
- M. S. Draupadi as Vedha
- Master Gopal as Younger Villalan
- Baby Sasikala as Younger Jeeva
- K. K. Perumal
- M. N. Krishnan
- M. K. Durai Raj
- K. K. Soundar as Parakraman
- S. S. Siva Sooriyan

== Soundtrack ==
Music was composed by Viswanathan–Ramamoorthy and lyrics were written by Thanjai N. Ramaiah Dass, A. Maruthakasi, Pattukkottai Kalyanasundaram and S. D. Sundharam. The song "Thendral Urangiya Podhum" is tuned in the Abheri raga. The song "Kaalamenum Kaattaaru" was taken from the stage play Kaviyin Kanavu, authored by S. D. Sundaram.

Song	Singer	Lyrics	Length
"Ethirikku Ethiri Sattaiyadi"	K. Jamuna Rani	Pattukottai Kalyanasundaram	03:15
"Azhadhe Pappaa Azhadhe"	T. S. Bagavathi	Pattukottai Kalyanasundaram	03:42
"Laai Lalla Laai Lalla...Uruludhu Peraludhu"	Jikki & K. Jamuna Rani	Pattukottai Kalyanasundaram	04:02
"Dil Rabsa" (Dio Dio)	S. C. Krishnan & A. G. Rathnamala	Thanjai N. Ramaiah Dass	01:29
"Konaadha Maratthile...Onne Onnu Adhu"	Tiruchi Loganathan, Jikki, P. Susheela & Sirkazhi Govindarajan	Thanjai N. Ramaiah Dass	04:36
"Aambalkki Kann Potta...Gum Gum Gum"	Tiruchi Loganathan & Jikki	Thanjai N. Ramaiah Dass	03:44
"Pachaiyilum Neeyum Pachai"	Sirkazhi Govindarajan & Jikki	Thanjai N. Ramaiah Dass	03:12
"Thendral Urangiya Podhum"	A. M. Rajah & P. Suseela	A. Maruthakasi	04:09
"Kannaalan Vandhiduvaar"	Jikki	A. Maruthakasi	03:27
"Petra Maganai Vitra Annai"	Sirkazhi Govindarajan	A. Maruthakasi	
"Mamma Mamma Pannaadai"	Jikki	A. Maruthakasi	03:16
"Kaalamenum Kaattaaru"	T. M. Soundararajan & P. Leela	S. D. Sundharam	03:33
"Thuyar Soozhndha Vaazhvinile"	K. Jamunarani		
