= Koduthu Vaithaval =

- Theatrical release poster
- Directed by: P. Neelakantan
- Written by: P. Neelakantan (dialogues)
- Screenplay by: Dada Mirasi
- Story by: Dada Mirasi
- Produced by: E. V. Ramana
- Starring: M. G. Ramachandran; M. R. Radha; E. V. Saroja
- Cinematography: G. Durai
- Edited by: R. Devarajan
- Music by: K. V. Mahadevan
- Production company: E. V. R. Pictures
- Release date: 9 February 1963
- Running time: 125 minutes
- Country: India
- Language: Tamil

Koduthu Vaithaval (transl. The Blessed Woman) is a 1963 Indian Tamil-language film directed by P. Neelakantan. The film stars M. G. Ramachandran, M. R. Radha and E. V. Saroja. It was released on 9 February 1963.

== Plot ==
Very disadvantaged from her birth, the unfortunate Meenakshi sees her existence darkening when she is forced to marry, by her foster mother, a simple-minded man, Murugan. The obnoxious cruel mother acts, to take revenge for her young brother, Manickam, a hooligan, arrested for murder and that she wanted at all costs to marry him to the poor Meenakshi, who refused. She ignores that she has just picked up the chance of a lifetime, nevertheless. Indeed, hiding behind this husband, ragged, quite dirty, is the billionaire Selvam, victim, some time previously, of an assassination attempt, that left him amnesic. Later, he recovers completely, but remembers Meenakshi no more and resumes his previous life, when he was betrothed to Nalini. As for Meenakshi, far from given up, is going to fight to restore the truth, which apparently, pleases hardly everybody, in particular, the sponsor of the murder, Jambulingam, Nalini's father. From his part, Selvam is going to lead its investigation, helped by good Natarajan, Nalini's elder brother.

== Cast ==
- M. G. Ramachandran as Selvam
- E. V. Saroja as Meenakshi
- L. Vijayalakshmi as Nalini
- M. R. Radha as Jambulingam
- K. A. Thangavelu as Natarajan
- S. A. Ashokan as Manickam
- M. V. Rajamma as Visalakshi
- G. Sakunthala as Sarasu alias Saraswathi
- M. S. Sundari Bai as Manickam's elder sister
- C. R. Parthiban
- Senthamarai

== Soundtrack ==
The music was composed by K. V. Mahadevan.

Song	Singers	Lyrics	Length
"Ennamma Sowkkiyamma"	T. M. Soundararajan, P. Susheela	Kannadasan	02:51
"Minnal Varum"	P. Susheela	Alangudi Somu	03:16
"Naan Yaar Theriyuma"	T. M. Soundararajan	Kannadasan	03:58
"Neeyum Naanum Ondru"	P. Susheela	A. Maruthakasi	03:15
"Paalatril Selaadudhu"	Sirkali Govindarajan, K. Jamuna Rani	Kannadasan	03:17
"Thala Thalavena"	T. M. Soundararajan & K. Jamuna Rani	A. Maruthakasi	02:48

== Reception ==
Kanthan of Kalki praised Neelakantan's direction and dialogues, saying the film would no doubt be a crowd-pleaser.
