= Ethaiyum Thangum Ithaiyam =

- Poster
- Directed by: P. Neelakantan
- Screenplay by: C. N. Annadurai
- Starring: S. S. Rajendran; C. R. Vijayakumari
- Cinematography: G. Durai
- Edited by: R. Devaraj
- Music by: T. R. Pappa
- Production company: Udhayasuriyan Productions
- Release date: 14 April 1962
- Country: India
- Language: Tamil

Ethayum Thangum Ithayam (transl. The heart that can endure anything) is a 1962 Indian Tamil-language drama film directed by P. Neelakantan. The film stars S. S. Rajendran and C. R. Vijayakumari. The screenplay was written by C. N. Annadurai.

== Plot ==
Singaravelar, a wealthy person, went for hunting. He met a jungle woman Sivakami and married her. He went back to the city, assuring Sivakami that he would soon come back and take her with him. A long time passes but he did not come back. Sivakami gave birth to a male child. Sivakami's mother handed over the baby to a man named Pakkiri, who named the child Madasamy. Meanwhile, Singaravelar sent someone to fetch Sivakami, but he came and reported that Sivakami is dead. Singaravelar marries his elder sister's daughter. When Madasamy grew up, Pakkiri told him his life story. Madasamy started looking for his father to take vengeance. He had a pistol with him. Mistaking another person for his father he attacked him but was caught and produced in the courts on a charge of theft. Singaravelar was presiding as the judge. During the proceedings, Singaravelar realises that Madasamy is his son. How the problems are solved forms the rest of the story.

== Cast ==
The following list was compiled from the film's song book.

- S. S. Rajendran
- M. R. Radha
- R. Muthuraman
- C. R. Vijayakumari
- B. S. Saroja
- T. K. S. Natarajan

Guest Artistes

- K. R. Ramasamy
- O. A. K. Thevar
- Manorama
- M. S. S. Packiam

== Soundtrack ==
Music was composed by T. R. Pappa.

The song "Kannum Kannum Kalanthathu" was first recorded for gramophone record sung by K. R. Ramasamy and S. Janaki. A word (Praathalu) in the song was objected by the censor board as vulgar. Then the song was re-recorded with A. L. Raghavan and S. Janaki singing. This version was included in the film. So, the gramophone record contains K. R. Ramasamy's voice, A. L. Raghavan's voice is heard as playback for K. R. R. in the film.

The song "Ullam Thedathe Endru Solluthe" was removed from the film.

Song	Lyricist	Singer/s	Length
"Chinna Chinna"	A. Maruthakasi	S. Janaki	
"Annai Mugam Endrenni"	Vaali	P. Susheela	
"Kadhal Kadhai Pesiduvom"	M. K. Athmanathan	P. Susheela	03:05
"Kannum Kannum Kalandhadhu Than Kadhale"	Thanjai N. Ramaiah Dass	A. L. Raghavan; S. Janaki	03:16
"Ullam Thedathe Endru Solludhe"	M. K. Athmanathan	K. R. Ramasamy; S. Janaki	03:30
"Kaniyirukku Virundu Vaikka"	Pattukkottai Kalyanasundaram	P. Leela	02:38
"Unakkum Enakkum Vegu Thooramillai"	M. K. Athmanathan	Soolamangalam Rajalakshmi	03:44
"Panjali Sabatham"	Thanjai N. Ramaiah Dass	S. V. Ponnusamy; Saraswathi and group	05:35
"Thangam Vilaiyum Thirunadu"	A. Maruthakasi	T. M. Soundararajan	
"Kannum Kannum Kalandhadhu Than Kadhale"	Thanjai N. Ramaiah Dass	K. R. Ramasamy; S. Janaki	03:16
