= Engal Kuladevi =

- Theatrical release poster
- Directed by: A. Subba Rao
- Screenplay by: M. K. Nathan
- Produced by: T. R. Sundaram
- Starring: K. Balaji; Pandaribai; Mynavathi; M. Saroja
- Cinematography: Rajanikanth; Pandian; C. S. S. Mani
- Edited by: L. Babu
- Music by: K. V. Mahadevan
- Production company: Modern Theatres
- Release date: 4 December 1959
- Running time: 168 minutes
- Country: India
- Language: Tamil

Engal Kuladevi (transl. Our Community Deity) is a 1959 Indian Tamil-language drama film directed by A. Subba Rao. The film was produced by T. R. Sundaram and stars K. Balaji, Pandari Bai and Mynavathi. It was released on 4 December 1959.

== Plot ==
Sabapathy, a retired postman, has two daughters — Meena, born to his first wife and Shanthi, born to his second wife Valli. Sabapathy arranges marriage for Meena with Vasanthan, who is the manager of a match-box company. Mangalam is a schoolmate of Valli. She poisons Valli's mind saying Vasanthan is more suitable to Valli's daughter Shanthi. Valli tries to coax Sabapathy, but he is determined and marries Meena to Vasanthan. During the first night of Vasanthan and Meena, someone has mixed poison in the milk and it comes to their knowledge. They leave Sabapathy's house and live in another house. Meena becomes pregnant and comes to Sabapathy's house for childbirth. She delivers a boy, Kumar but becomes restless and insane after the child-birth. Vasanthan suspects foul play and takes Meena and child with him. While travelling in the train, while Vasanthan is sleeping, Meena in her deranged state gets out of the train. Vasanthan is shocked when he wakes up and finds Meena is missing. A rumour spreads that Meena is dead, having been caught under the train and her body was mutilated. Now Shanthi comes to live with Vasanthan and to look after the child. Sabapathy learns that it was Valli who poisoned Meena and he dies of shock. In the meantime, Meena is saved by some people while she was lying by the side of the railway track and is admitted to a hospital. She is cured and comes in search of her husband. She sees that Shanthi is now living with her husband and looking after her child well. She does not want to disturb their life and goes to live with her friend Maragatham, who is also the wife of Vasanthan's office-mate. After the death of Sabapathy, Valli comes to live with Shanthi and Vasanthan. Though Vasanthan does not like her presence, he allows her to stay. Valli poisons the child and the child also becomes insane. Shanthi learns that her mother is the culprit. She gets wild with Valli. Vasanthan suspects Shanthi and takes the child to Maragatham and asks her to look after the child. Meena, who was staying with Maragatham realises there is a problem brewing in Vasanthan's home. She asks Maragatham to visit Vasanthan's home and find out what is happening. How everything is solved forms the rest of the story.

== Cast ==
Adapted from the film's song book.

Male

- K. Balaji as Vasanthan
- Javar Seetharaman as Mr. Santhosham
- V. R. Rajagopal as Shankaralingam
- A. Karunanidhi as Chanakiyan
- M. A. Ganapathi as Sabapathi
- V. M. Ezhumalai as Kannayiram

Female

- M. Pandari Bai as Meena
- M. Mynavathi as Shanthi
- M. Saroja as Maragatham
- K. Suryakala as Amutha
- S. N. Lakshmi as Valli
- P. S. Gnanam as Mangalam

== Soundtrack ==
Music was composed by K. V. Mahadevan while the lyrics were penned by A. Maruthakasi.

Song	Singer/s	Duration (m:ss)
"Onnum Theriyaadha Kanni"	Thiruchi Loganathan, L. R. Eswari & group	05:00
"Malgova Maambalame Maadhulaiye"	P. Susheela	03:08
"Vaadaa Malligaiye Vaadaa"	P. Susheela	03:35
"Pachai Pasungiliye"	P. Susheela	03:55
"Kannaadi Kannam Kaanbavar"	K. Jamuna Rani & group	03:29
"Oh...Vandu Aadaadha Solaiyil"	Sirkazhi Govindarajan & P. Susheela	02:52
"Kattaana Dhaehakattu"	K. Jamuna Rani	
"Chittang Chittang Kuruvi"	A. G. Rathnamala	
"Paalum Pazhamirukka, Pakkathile"	A. G. Rathnamala	04:35
"Ye Kutti Navamma Yem Mele Kovama"	T. M. Soundararajan & P. Susheela	04.58
