= Kavitha (1962 film) =

- Poster
- Directed by: T. R. Raghunath
- Screenplay by: Murasoli Maran
- Starring: M. R. Radha; M. N. Nambiar; Rajasulochana
- Cinematography: R. Sampath
- Edited by: L. Balu
- Music by: K. V. Mahadevan
- Production company: Modern Theatres
- Release date: 2 September 1962
- Running time: 2:43 (4,482 meters (14,705 ft))
- Country: India
- Language: Tamil

Kavitha is a 1962 Indian Tamil-language film directed by T. R. Raghunath. The film stars M. R. Radha and Rajasulochana. It was released on 2 September 1962.

== Plot ==
Kavitha is the daughter of a rich man, Sabapathy Mudaliar, who loves Durai, an artist. Mudaliar falls sick and wants Kavitha to marry his sister's son, Rajasekaran who lives in Malaysia. Caught between love and affection, Kavitha feels it is important to save her father's love and sacrifices her love. She marries Rajasekaran but soon she finds that he drinks too much. He demands for more and more money and beats her if she refuses to give it. This worries Mudaliar. In the meantime, another woman, Ponnamma, who is a look alike of Kavitha enters the family. She consoles Kavitha and tries to advise Rajasekaran. But Rajasekaran sends Kavitha to a mental hospital and shows Ponnamma as Kavitha to Mudaliar. Kavitha suspects the true identity of Rajasekaran. Ponnamma, who knows the truth about Rajasekaran's identity, is unable to reveal it to Mudaliar as she is pretending to be Kavitha. However, Ponnamma falls sick and dies. In the meantime, Durai and Gomathi, Kavitha's cousin, and Leela, Kavitha's friend, are trying to find Rajasekaran's true identity. How they do it and rescues Kavitha forms the rest of the story.

== Cast ==
List adapted from the database of Film News Anandan and from the song book.

Male cast

- M. R. Radha
- M. N. Nambiar
- S. V. Ranga Rao
- T. S. Balaiah as Malaippan

Female cast

- Rajasulochana (in Dual roles)
- Pandari Bai
- Pushpalatha
- Seethalakshmi
- Vidyavathi as Lucy

Dance

- Ragini
- Harban Lal

== Production ==
The film was produced by Modern Theatres and was directed by T. R. Raghunath. Story and dialogues were written by Murasoli Maran. R. Sampath was in charge of cinematography while L. Balu handled the editing. Art direction was by B. Nagarajan. Hiralal and P. Jayaram did the choreography. Still photography was done by A. J. Joseph. Rajasulochana featured in dual roles in this film.

== Soundtrack ==
Music was composed by K. V. Mahadevan.

Song	Singer/s	Lyricist	Length
"Paarkka Paarkka Mayakkuthadi"	P. Susheela & K. Jamuna Rani	A. Maruthakasi	03:24
"Oorirundhum Veedillai"	M. S. Rajeswari	A. Maruthakasi	03:10
"Kannukkulle Onnirukku"	T. M. Soundararajan & K. Jamuna Rani	A. Maruthakasi	04:51
"Ulle Irukkum Ponnammaa"	T. M. Soundararajan & K. Jamuna Rani	A. Maruthakasi	03:19
"Manakkum Roja My Lady"	A. L. Raghavan & K. Jamuna Rani	A. Maruthakasi	03:30
"Parakkum Paravaigal Neeye"	P. B. Srinivas & K. Jamuna Rani	Kannadasan	03:18
"Megam Vandhathu Minnal Vandhathu"	P. Susheela	Kannadasan	
"Appaa Un Magalai Paarthaayaa"	P. Susheela	Kannadasan	
