= Kadavulai Kanden =

- Poster
- Directed by: A. S. A. Sami
- Written by: Sornam
- Produced by: K. R. Balan
- Starring: M. R. Radha; Kalyan Kumar; Sowcar Janaki; Devika
- Music by: K. V. Mahadevan
- Production company: Balan Pictures
- Release date: 13 January 1963
- Country: India
- Language: Tamil

Kadavulai Kanden (transl. I saw God) is a 1963 Indian Tamil-language film directed by A. S. A. Sami. The film stars M. R. Radha, Kalyan Kumar, Sowcar Janaki and Devika.

== Cast ==
The list was adapted from the book Thiraikalanjiyam.

Male cast

- M. R. Radha
- Kalyan Kumar
- R. Muthuraman
- Nagesh
- J. P. Chandrababu
- Muthaiah
- Karikkol Raju
- M. R. R. Vasu

Female cast

- Sowcar Janaki
- Devika
- Gemini Chandra
- Sukumari
- Kumari Rukmini

== Soundtrack ==
The music was composed by K. V. Mahadevan, and the lyrics were penned by Kannadasan.The song "Poi Sonnare, Poi Sonnare" was released only on a 78 RPM record. The song, "Konjam Sindhikkanum" is loosely based on the Russian song, "Dark Eyes".

Song	Singer/s	Length
"Ungal Kaikal Uyarattum"	P. B. Srinivas & J. P. Chandrababu	
"Dheepaththai Vaiththukondu"	P. Susheela	04:13
"Vidiya Vidiya Pesinaalum"	T. M. Soundararajan & P. Susheela	03:27
"Anna Anna Sugam Thaanaa"	P. Susheela & K. Jamuna Rani	
"Konjam Sindhikkanum"	J. P. Chandrababu & L. R. Eswari	03:31
"Kadavul Enge, Kadavul Enge"	K. Jamuna Rani & L. R. Eswari	
"Poi Sonnaare, Poi Sonnaare"	P. B. Srinivas	03:26

== Reception ==
Kanthan of Kalki called the story odd, but appreciated the dialogues. He said the film could be watched once for Chandrababu's comedy.
