= Ullasa Payanam =

- Theatrical release poster
- Directed by: Sathyam
- Written by: K. Devarajan
- Produced by: M. A. Venu
- Starring: S. S. Rajendran; R. Vijayakumari
- Cinematography: K. Ramachandran
- Edited by: E. Arunachalam
- Music by: K. V. Mahadevan
- Production company: Salem Movies
- Release date: 3 November 1964
- Country: India
- Language: Tamil

Ullasa Payanam (pronounced [ullaːsa pajaɳam] transl. Fun journey) is a 1964 Indian Tamil-language adventure film directed by Sathyam and written by K. Devarajan. The film stars S. S. Rajendran and R. Vijayakumari. It was released on 3 November 1964.

== Cast ==
Male cast

- S. S. Rajendran
- M. R. Radha
- S. A. Ashokan
- K. A. Thangavelu

Female cast

- R. Vijayakumari
- S. Varalakshmi
- Rukmani
- Meera Devi
- Padmini
- Pushpamala
- Sadhana

== Soundtrack ==
The music was composed by K. V. Mahadevan, with lyrics by Trichy Tyagarajan.

Track listing
No.	Title	Singer(s)	Length
1.	"Chithira Penne"	S. Janaki
2.	"Paartha Kangal"	S. Janaki, T. M. Soundararajan
3.	"Poda Poda Paithiyam"	T. M. Soundararajan
4.	"Poottiya Manathai"	T. M. Soundararajan
5.	"Vanathil Aayiram"	S. Janaki

== Release and reception ==
Ullasa Payanam was released on 3 November 1964, during Diwali. Writing for Kalki, A. Chandrasekaran gave the film a negative review, saying it had no newness in any aspect, and barring one or two, none of the songs were memorable.
