= Naalvar =

1953 film

- Poster
- Directed by: V. Krishnan
- Written by: A. P. Nagarajan
- Based on: Naalvar (play) by A. P. Nagarajan
- Produced by: M. A. Venu
- Starring: A. P. Nagarajan; Kumari Thankam; N. N. Kannappa; M. N. Krishnan; T. P. Muthulakshmi
- Cinematography: J. G. Vijayam
- Music by: K. V. Mahadevan
- Production company: Sangeetha Pictures
- Release date: 5 November 1953
- Country: India
- Language: Tamil

Naalvar (transl. Four people) is a 1953 Indian Tamil-language drama film directed by V. Krishnan. The film stars A. P. Nagarajan, Kumari Thankam, N. N. Kannappa, M. N. Krishnan and T. P. Muthulakshmi in major roles. Nagarajan, who played the main lead was also the writer of the film. The film revolves around a family consisting of four siblings. It is based on Nagarajan's play of the same name.

== Plot ==
A. P. Nagarajan plays a sincere cop who is the eldest of four siblings in a family whose father works as a secretary to a mill owner. The second of the four siblings is a lawyer, third is employed in the same mill where their father works as a supervisor, (M. N. Krishnan) and the youngest of all is a social activist. Nagarajan happens to meet Kumari Thangam, and fines her for an offence. He does not know that she is the daughter of his father's boss. He is very sincere in his duty and he even arrests his own brother when the latter commits a crime, and even takes the blame when his father's enemies try to make that his father was involved in the smuggling of gold and printing of counterfeit currency notes, in order to protect his father and the image of the family.

== Cast ==
- A. P. Nagarajan
- Kumari Thankam
- N. N. Kannappa
- S. R. Janaki
- T. P. Muthulakshmi
- M. N. Krishnan
- V. N. Natesan
- R. Balasubramaniam
- C. R. Vijayakumari
- V. M. Ezhumalai
- E. R. Sahadevan
- S. S. Majid
- Ratnakumari
- N. S. Narayana Pillai
- A. R. Damodaram
- T. K. Swaminathan
- V. R. Natarajan
- T. V. Satyamurthi
- Gauthamdas
- K. N. Kanakasabai

Dance

- Kumari Kamala
- Rita
- Sulochana

== Production ==
Naalvar was shot at the Central Studios, Coimbatore and was produced by M. A. Venu under the banner Sangeetha Pictures. V. Krishnan was the director and the script was provided by A. P. Nagarajan. C. R. Vijayakumari, who later became a popular actress in Tamil cinema, played a small role in the film.

== Soundtrack ==
The soundtrack was provided by K. V. Mahadevan. The song "Mayile Maal Marugan" did not take place in the film.

Song	Singer/s	Lyricist	Duration (m:ss)
"Arul Thaarum Emathannaiye"	N. L. Ganasaraswathi	A. Maruthakasi	
"Agapattu Kondaayaa"	U. R. Chandra & A. G. Rathnamala	A. Maruthakasi	
"Irul Soozhum Vaanil"	M. L. Vasanthakumari	A. Maruthakasi	03:22
"Inbam Kolludhe"	M. L. Vasanthakumari	A. Maruthakasi	02:59
"Vaana Veedhiyil Parandhiduvom"	Thiruchi Loganathan & M. L. Vasanthakumari	A. Maruthakasi	03:19
"Abaraadham Ruubaa Aimbadhu"	K. V. Mahadevan & K. Rani	Thanjai N. Ramaiah Dass	02:50
"Kannu Therinju Nadakkanum"	A. P. Nagarajan & U. R. Chandra	Thanjai N. Ramaiah Dass	
"Valluvanaar Seydha Thozhil"	U. R. Chandra, G. Ponnammal & group	Ka. Mu. Sheriff	06:12
"Lavukku Lavukku Love"	K. V. Mahadevan & K. Rani		02:36
"Mayile Maal Marugan"	M. L. Vasanthakumari		03:06

== Release and reception ==
Naalvar was released on 5 November 1953. The film fared well at the box-office and Nagarajan came to be known as "Naalvar Nagarajan".
