= C. R. Vijayakumari =

Indian actress

- Born: Vijayalakshmi; 1938 (age 87–88); Mettupalayam, Coimbatore District, Tamil Nadu
- Occupation: Actress
- Years active: 1953-2003
- Spouse: S. S. Rajendran (1961-1973)
- Children: 1

C. R. Vijayakumari is an Indian actress who worked in the Tamil film industry from 1953 to 2003.

== Film career ==
Vijayakumari debuted under the name Mohana. Subsequently, the name Vijayakumari was chosen. Vijayakumari is known for her ability to convincingly transform herself into the characters she portrays. She is noted for her Tamil diction and dialog delivery. Her acting credits in films include Kumudam, Saradha, Kumgumam,Naanum Oru Penn Santhi, Aanandhi, Avan Pithan, Alli, Thedi vantha thirumagal, Pachai Vilakku, Paar Magale Paar, Kaakkum Karangal, Policekãran Magal, Kodimalar, and Aalayamani. One of her best performances is as Kannagi in the movie Poompuhar. The film, written by M. Karunanidhi, features the longest dialogue spoken by a female actor till today.

== Personal life ==
She had a 12-year relationship with actor S. S. Rajendran from 1961 to 1973. The couple have a son Ravikumar, born in 1963.

== Filmography ==
Year	Film	Role	Language	Notes
1953	Naalvar		Tamil	
1956	Kula Deivam		Tamil	
1958	Petra Maganai Vitra Annai	Jeeva	Tamil	
1958	Padhi Bhakti		Tamil	
1958	Vanjikottai Valiban	Gowri	Tamil	
1958	Raj Tilak	Savitri	Hindi	
1959	Azhagarmalai Kalvan		Tamil	
1959	Kalyana Parisu	Geetha	Tamil	
1959	Manaiviye Manithanin Manickam		Tamil	
1959	Naatukoru Nallaval		Tamil	
1960	Thangarathinam		Tamil	
1960	Thangam Manasu Thangam		Tamil	
1961	Kumudham	Shantha	Tamil	
1961	Panam Panthiyile		Tamil	
1962	Aalayamani	Prema	Tamil	
1962	Deivathin Deivam		Tamil	
1962	Ethaiyum Thangum Ithaiyam		Tamil	
1962	Muthu Mandapam		Tamil	
1962	Paadha Kannikkai		Tamil	
1962	Policekaran Magal	Janaki	Tamil	
1962	Saratha	Saratha	Tamil	
1963	Kunkhumam	Gomathi	Tamil	
1963	Aasai Alaigal	Amudha	Tamil	
1963	Kaithiyin Kathali		Tamil	
1963	Kaanchi Thalaivan	Narasimha's sister	Tamil	
1963	Mani Osai		Tamil	
1963	Naanum Oru Penn	Kalyani	Tamil	
1963	Neengadha Ninaivu		Tamil	
1963	Paar Magaley Paar	Chandra	Tamil	
1964	Alli		Tamil	
1964	Pachai Vilakku	Sumathi	Tamil	
1964	Vazhi Piranthadu		Tamil	
1964	Poompuhar	Kannagi	Tamil	
1964	Ullasa Payanam		Tamil	
1965	Anandhi	Anandhi	Tamil	
1965	Kaakum Karangal	Mahalakshmi	Tamil	
1965	Panam Tharum Parisu		Tamil	
1965	Poomalai	Poomalai	Tamil	
1965	Santhi	Santhi	Tamil	
1965	Paditha Manaivi		Tamil	
1965	Vazhikatti		Tamil	
1966	Avan Pithana?	Gomathi	Tamil	
1966	Kodimalar	Lakshmi	Tamil	
1966	Mani Magudam		Tamil	
1966	Thaaye Unakkaga	Lakshmi	Tamil	
1966	Thedi Vandha Thirumagal		Tamil	
1967	Penn Endral Penn	Banu	Tamil	
1967	Sundara Moorthi Nayanar		Tamil	
1967	Vivasayee	Kaveri	Tamil	
1967	Kanavan	Ponni	Tamil	
1967	Bhavani	Bhavani	Tamil	
1968	Kallum Kaniyagum		Tamil	
1968	Thaer Thiruvizha		Tamil	
1968	Kallum Kaniyagum		Tamil	Guest appearance
1968	Jeevanaamsam	Lalitha	Tamil	
1968	Teacheramma		Tamil	
1968	Sathiyam Thavaradhey		Tamil	
1968	Selviyin Selvan		Tamil	
1968	Thaer Thiruvizha	Sivagami	Tamil	
1969	Avare En Deivam		Tamil	
1969	Manaivi		Tamil	
1969	Porchilai		Tamil	
1969	Kanne Pappa	Marharatham	Tamil	
1969	Magane Nee Vazhga		Tamil	
1970	Kalam Vellum		Tamil	
1971	Savaale Samali	Kaveri	Tamil	
1972	Agathiyar	Mandothari	Tamil	
1972	Pillaiyo Pillai	Kanchana	Tamil	
1972	Bathilukku Bathil		Tamil	
1972	Ellai Kodu		Tamil	
1972	Deiva Sankalpam		Tamil	
1973	Rajaraja Cholan	The Queen	Tamil	
1973	Thirumalai Deivam	Amutha	Tamil	
1974	Anbai Thedi	Janaki	Tamil	
1975	Amudha	Amudha	Tamil	
1976	Chitra Pournami	Durga/Vijaya	Tamil	
1977	Sri Krishna Leela	Devaki	Tamil	
1978	Per Solla Oru Pillai		Tamil	
1978	Kaviraja Kalamegam		Tamil	
1982	Metti	Kalyani Amma	Tamil	
1983	Thanga Magan		Tamil	
1984	Naan Mahaan Alla	Viswanath's mother	Tamil	
1986	Vasantha Raagam	Vasantha's mother	Tamil	
1986	Maaveeran	Gowri	Tamil	
1990	Periya Idathu Pillai		Tamil	
1991	Vanakkam Vathiyare		Tamil	
1993	Aranmanai Kili		Tamil	
1993	Athma	Guhai Amma	Tamil	
1994	Periya Marudhu	Kannamma	Tamil	
1996	Poove Unakkaga	Sadhasivam's wife	Tamil	
1996	Aavathum Pennale Azhivathum Pennale		Tamil	
1997	Dharma Chakkaram	Vijayalakshmi's adoptive mother	Tamil	
1999	Iraniyan		Tamil	
2000	Thenali	Mental patient	Tamil	
2000	Kalisundam Raa	Aliveelu Mangatayaru	Telugu	
2003	Kadhal Sadugudu		Tamil	
