= Kattu Roja =

- Theatrical release poster
- Directed by: A. Subba Rao
- Written by: M. S. Solaimani; N. Padmanaban; G. Devarajan
- Produced by: T. R. Sundaram
- Starring: S. S. Rajendran; Padmini
- Cinematography: R. Sambath W. I. C. A.
- Edited by: L. Balu
- Music by: K. V. Mahadevan
- Production company: Modern Theatres
- Release date: 12 April 1963
- Running time: 131 minutes
- Country: India
- Language: Tamil

Kattu Roja (Tamil pronunciation: [kaːʈu ɾoːdʑaː] transl. Forest Rose) is 1963 Indian Tamil-language romantic drama film, directed by A. Subba Rao and produced by Modern Theatres. The script was written by M. S. Solaimani and the dialogue was by N. Padmanabam and G. Devarajan. The music was by K. V. Mahadevan. The film stars S. S. Rajendran and Padmini, with M. R. Radha, R. S. Manohar, V. K. Ramasamy, G. Varalakshmi and K. A. Thangavelu. It was released on 12 April 1963.

== Plot ==
A young, innocent man, Baskaran lives alone with his elderly parents Ponnambla Mudaliar, Vadivu and his cousin Kuzhandai Velu. The elderly couple wishes for an arranged marriage for their family friend Shanmuga Mudaliar and daughter Baby. So, Baskar and his cousin visit Neelagiri for Shanmuga Mudaliar's home. On the way, their car was struggling, so Thangavelu searches water, meantime, Baskar drives the car and has an accident. A young village girl Ponni saves him and she gives aid for his injured body.

Then both fall in love with each other. Meanwhile, Kuzhandai Velu reaches Shanmuga Mudaliar's home, meets him and his daughter Baby. Baby and Kuzhandai fall in love. And after searching for Baskar, finally he finds him. Then, Kuzhandai was received at home with Baskar. Baskar ever time was spelled for Kattu Roja. So, his parents and cousin decided he was mentally disturbed. In the meantime, Somu reached Ponni's home. Ponni's father was dying in bed, her father was to bring Ponni for his Uncle Somu's hand.

Then, there was comes to Ponnamblam house and Ponni joins for house maid. In the meantime, the household faces some problems for son shapes. Accidentally, Baskar and Ponni meet again. Since, he was disturbed for heartly. Baskar was, in the meantime, closed relationship with his Uncle Thanga Durai, wish like his sister Pushpa gets married Baskar, So he hatches a secret plan for this. Baskar goes to the wrong pathway and becomes an alcoholic. His mother worries about her son's attitude and once Baskar tries to molest Ponni.

Then Vadivu decided to arrange a marriage of Ponni and Somu. Ponni tries to commit suicide, Baskar saved her life at a mountain edge. Somu knew Ponni's past life. Baskar is her past lover. Finally, Baskar and Ponni get married, but Thanga Durai stopped the ceremonies. Because, he told Baskar secretly married his sister Pushpa and their couple has one female child. The baby is also identified, but who is the father? In the meantime, Kuzhandi Velu says in truth the baby is Thanga Durai's child. He was spoiled Ponni's sister's life, so she leaves the child in Baskar's car and Baskar submits the baby to Thanga Durai. Thanga Durai was trained to baby for shows Baskar and Pushpa photograph and teach the child for father and mother identifications. Finally Thanga Durai admits his mistake and reunites with his family and Pushpa marries Somu.

== Cast ==
- S. S. Rajendran as Baskaran
- Padmini as Ponni
- M. R. Radha as Thanga Durai
- R. S. Manohar as Somu, Baskar's house servant
- V. K. Ramasamy as Ponnambla Mudaliar, Baskar's father
- K. A. Thangavelu as Kuzhandai Velu, Baskar's cousin
- G. Varalakshmi as Vadivu, Baskar's mother
- Pushpalatha as Pushpa, Thanga Durai's sister
- G. Sakunthala as Baby
- P. D. Sambandam as Shanmuga Mudaliar
- T. S. Muthaiah as Ponni's father
- B. S. Saroja as Ponni's elder sister

== Soundtrack ==
Music was composed by K. V. Mahadevan.

Song	Singer	Lyrics	Length
"Kathavu Thiranthatha"	P. Susheela	Kannadasan	4:04
"Vandondru Vanthathu"	T. M. Soundararajan P. Susheela	Kannadasan	3:52
"Chinna Chinna Kannakukku"	T. M. Soundararajan P. Susheela	Kannadasan	3:11
"Entha Oor Endravane"	P. B. Srinivas	Kannadasan	3:21
"Ennai Paaru Paaru"	K. Jamuna Rani	Panchu Arunachalam	3:31
