= Naatukoru Nallaval =

- Poster
- Directed by: Dasaratha Ramaiah
- Screenplay by: Iraniyal Ravi
- Story by: Acharya Athreya
- Produced by: R. Subbaiah
- Starring: S. S. Rajendran; Vijayakumari; T. S. Balaiah; S. V. Sahasranamam; Pandari Bai
- Cinematography: R. N. Pillai
- Music by: Master Venu
- Production company: Majestic Pictures
- Release date: 17 July 1959
- Running time: 167 minutes
- Country: India
- Language: Tamil

Naattukoru Nallaval (transl. A good woman for the country) is a 1959 Indian Tamil language film produced by Majestic Pictures and directed by Dasaratha Ramaiah. The film stars S. S. Rajendran and Vijayakumari. It was released on 17 July 1959.

== Cast ==
The following list was adapted from the database of Film News Anandan

Male cast

- S. S. Rajendran
- T. S. Balaiah
- S. V. Sahasranamam
- Peer Mohamed
- Sivasuryan

Female cast

- Vijayakumari
- Pandari Bai
- Kamini
- K. S. Angamuthu
- C. T. Rajakantham

== Production ==
The film was produced by R. Subbaiah under the banner Majestic Pictures and was directed by Dasaratha Ramaiah. Acharya Athreya wrote the story while the screenplay and dialogues were written by Iraniyal Ravi. R. N. Pillai handled the cinematography. Art direction was done by M. Varadhan. P. Jayaraman was in charge of choreography. Still photography was done by M. S. Gnanam.

== Soundtrack ==
The music for the film was composed by Master Venu, while the lyrics were penned by M. K. Athmanathan.

| Song | Singer/s | Duration (m:ss) |
|---|---|---|
| "Kannum Kannum Koodum" | Seergazhi Govindarajan, M. S. Rajeswari, T. K. Kumaresan, Renuka | 3:17 |
| "Vanna Malarodu Konjum" | Seergazhi Govindarajan, P. Susheela | 3:23 |
| "Aanandham Thaaraajo" | | |
| "En Kaadhalum Niraiverumaa" | P. Susheela | 2:52 |
| "Panbukor Ilakiyamaai" | Ghantasala | |
| "Azhagamudhe Odi Vaa" | A. L. Raghavan, K. Jamuna Rani | 2:49 |
| "Kaalam Varappogudhu Thannale" | Seergazhi Govindarajan, L. R. Eswari and group | 3:16 |
| "Needhi Aneedhi Modhum Kalamanro" | P. B. Srinivas | 3:16 |
