= Avare En Deivam =

- Directed by: C. N. Shanmugam
- Story by: C. N. Shanmugam
- Produced by: R. M. Muthiah; A. Veerappan
- Starring: Gemini Ganesh; Muthuraman; Vijayakumari; Rajasree
- Cinematography: Vindhanji
- Edited by: A. Govindaswami
- Music by: T.R.Paappa
- Production company: Meenakshi Sundareswar Films
- Release date: 10 May 1969
- Country: India
- Language: Tamil

Avare En Deivam (transl. He is my god) is a 1969 Indian Tamil-language film written and directed by C. N. Shanmugam, and produced by R. M. Muthiah and A. Veerappan. The film stars Gemini Ganesh, Muthuraman, Vijayakumari and Rajasree. It was released on 10 May 1969.

== Cast ==
Male cast

- Gemini Ganesh
- Muthuraman
- Nagesh
- V. S. Raghavan
- Mali
- Seshadri
- R. M. Somasundaram
- R. M. Meiyappan

Female cast

- Vijayakumari
- Rajasree
- S. Varalakshmi
- Bhanumathi
- Sivagami
- Baby Sumathi

== Production ==
Avare En Deivam was directed by C. N. Shanmugam, who also wrote the story and the dialogues were written by Balamurugan. The film was produced by R. M. Muthiah and A. Veerappan under Meenakshi Sundareswar Films. Cinematography was handled by Vindhanji, and editing by A. Govindaswami.

== Soundtrack ==
The soundtrack was composed by T. R. Pappa, with lyrics by Kannadasan.

Track listing
No.	Title	Singer(s)	Length
1.	"Ennadi Unga Nagarigam"	P. Susheela, L. R. Eswari
2.	"Azhage Unakku Gunamirandu"	P. B. Sreenivas, L. R. Eswari
3.	"Kattana Muthu Muthuchirippu"	P. Susheela
4.	"Kannazhagil Mannulagai Aadvaippaen"	P. Susheela

== Release and reception ==
Avare En Deivam was released on 10 May 1969. The Indian Express wrote on 17 May, "The film meanders with so many things to say that it was like trying to tell the story of everyone come to board a train on a railway platform. Most of the scenes lack conviction. The film is too long and lacks emphasis." T. G. Vaidyanathan of Film World took notice of numerous sex scenes in the film.
