= K. K. Soundar =

Tamil film actor

K.K. Soundar
- Born: Soundar; 1925; Erode
- Died: 8 February 2003 (78)
- Occupation: Actor
- Years active: 1950-2002
- Spouse: Gnanasoundari
- Children: 3
- Awards: Kalaimamani Award (1992)

K. K. Soundar (1925-2003) was a Tamil film actor from India. He is best known for Vallavan Oruvan, Sarvadhikari, and Alibabavum 40 Thirudargalum. He did many character roles in Tamil movies from the 1950s to the 1990s.

== Awards ==
- 1992: Received title of Kalaimamani Award by the Government of Tamil Nadu, which is the highest state honour in the field of Arts.

== Filmography ==
=== 1930s ===
Year	Film	Role	Notes
1939	Jothi		Lost film

=== 1950s ===
Year	Film	Role	Notes
1950	Manthiri Kumari		
1951	Sarvadhikari	Mohan	
1952	Valayapathi		
1953	Thirumbi Paar	Sub-Inspector	
1954	Illara Jothi	Rajaman Singh	
1954	Sugam Enge	Inspector	
1956	Alibabavum 40 Thirudargalum	Abdullah	
1957	Aaravalli	Prisoner	
1958	Petra Maganai Vitra Annai	Parakraman	
1959	Vannakilli	Police Inspector	

=== 1960s ===
Year	Film	Role	Notes
1961	Kumudham	Inspector	
1962	Paasam	Mayandi	
1963	Annai Illam	Inspector	
1963	Konjum Kumari	Soundar	
1964	Pachai Vilakku	Henchman	
1965	Engal Veetu Pillai	Film Director	
1965	Vallavanukku Vallavan	Inspector	
1966	Nadodi		
1966	Saraswati Sabatham	Soldier	
1966	Thaimel Aanai	Padma's father	
1966	Thedi Vantha Thirumagal		
1967	Vivasayee	Officer	
1968	Ther Thiruvizha	Production Manager	
1968	Bommalattam	Henchman	
1968	Soappu Seeppu Kannadi		
1969	Manasatchi		

=== 1970s ===
Year	Film	Role	Notes
1970	Kaaviya Thalaivi		
1970	Thedi Vandha Mappillai	TTR	
1970	En Annan		
1971	Punnagai	Interviewer	
1971	Justice Viswanathan		
1972	Itho Enthan Deivam		
1972	Thavapudhalavan	Blind man	
1972	Karunthel Kannayiram		
1973	Pookkaari		
1973	Thedi Vandha Lakshmi		
1974	Netru Indru Naalai	Slum Resident	
1975	Andharangam	Constable	
1975	Hotel Sorgam		
1975	Vaazhnthu Kaattugiren		
1975	Naalai Namadhe		
1976	Unarchigal	Police Inspector	
1976	Satyam	Villager	
1977	Meenava Nanban	In charge of Coolie	
1978	Vanakkatukuriya Kathaliye	Ramu	
1978	Kizhakke Pogum Rail	President	
1978	Ival Oru Seethai		
1978	Sigappu Rojakkal	Police inspector	
1979	Puthiya Vaarpugal	Jothi's father	

=== 1980s ===
Year	Film	Role	Notes
1980	Oru Kai Osai		
1980	Nizhalgal	Gopi's father	
1981	Sivappu Malli		
1982	Parvaiyin Marupakkam	Priest	
1982	Kalyana Kalam		
1983	Mann Vasanai		
1983	Mundhanai Mudichu	Village President	
1984	Priyamudan Prabhu		
1985	Mannukketha Ponnu	Villager	
1985	Chinna Veedu	Madanagopal's father	
1986	Kanna Thorakkanum Saami		
1986	Namma Ooru Nalla Ooru		
1986	Mannukkul Vairam		
1987	Jaathi Pookkal		
1987	Manaivi Ready	Chintamani's father	
1987	Shankar Guru	Schoolmaster	
1988	Thaimel Aanai		
1988	Poo Pootha Nandavanam		
1989	Sonthakkaran	Bus conductor	

=== 1990s ===
Year	Film	Role	Notes
1990	Paattali Magan		
1990	Neengalum Herothan	Village President	
1990	Vedikkai En Vadikkai	Rajapandi Thevar	
1990	Namma Ooru Poovatha		
1990	Maruthu Pandi		
1990	Nalla Kaalam Porandaachu	Train Passenger	
1990	Sathan Sollai Thattathe	Bhuvana's father	
1991	Vasanthakala Paravai	Ravi's father	
1991	Vaa Arugil Vaa	Arunagiri, Lakshmi's father	
1992	Onna Irukka Kathukanum	Andiappan	
1992	Chinna Pasanga Naanga	Kaalimuthu	
1992	Suyamariyadhai	Ponnambalam	
1994	Pattukottai Periyappa		
1994	Mani Rathnam	Thangam's father	
1995	Thamizhachi	Thamizh's father	
1996	Mahaprabhu	Jothi's father	
1996	Vetri Mugam	Sumathi's father	
1996	Veettukulle Thiruvizha	Gounder	
1996	Senathipathi		
1997	Periya Thambi	Muthu's father	
1997	Arunachalam		
1997	Rettai Jadai Vayasu	Anjali's brother	
1997	Nesam Pudhusu		
1997	Pasamulla Pandiyare		
1998	Maru Malarchi	Manimaran's father	
1998	Urimai Por	Chandru's father	
1998	Rathna		
1999	Suriya Paarvai		
1999	Jayam	Rahim Bhai	

=== 2000s ===
Year	Film	Role	Notes
2000	Ninaivellam Nee		
2000	Kannukku Kannaga		
2002	Unnai Ninaithu	Surya's father	Soundar's last movie
