= S. N. Lakshmi =

Indian actress (1927–2012)

- Born: Sennelkudi Narayanan Lakshmi; 1927; Virudhunagar, Madras Presidency, British India (now Tamil Nadu), India
- Died: 20 February 2012 (age 85); Chennai, Tamil Nadu; India
- Occupation: actress
- Years active: 1948–2012

Sennalkudi Narayanan Lakshmi (1927 – 20 February 2012) was an Indian actress, who appeared in supporting roles, often playing roles of a mother or grandmother in films. A recipient of the state government's Kalaimamani and Kalaiselvam awards, Lakshmi acted in more than 1,500 films and 6,000 dramas.

== Early life ==
Lakshmi was born to Narayana Thevar as the thirteenth child and left home aged 11 because her six older brothers did not give her the attention she wanted. Her family had to move from their village town of Sennalkudi to Virudhunagar after their father had died and her mother worked at a small hotel and also at the temple to keep the family afloat. Her neighbour, a dancer, helped Lakshmi join a drama troupe and she quickly picked up the steps she was taught and travelled with them from place to place. When the actors reached Raja Mannargudi they left her with a family which put her on a train to Madras and bade farewell. When she was wandering alone, help came in the form of a lorry driver's wife who noticed her and showed her the way to Gemini Studios, which opened its doors to the destitute. It took eight years for her family to find her.

She soon joined the studio staff at a salary of Rs. 150 and then rented a house with four other young girls and hired a cook. Before her film career began, Lakshmi had years of theatre experience, with more than 2,000 plays to her credit. From Ganandesikar's and N. S. Krishnan's theatre troupes to S. V. Sahasranamam's Seva Stage and K. Balachander's Ragini Recreations, Lakshmi trained under stalwarts. Lakshmi acted as a man in many all-woman plays, doing stunts and acrobatics and even fought a leopard as an extra in the MGR film, Baghdad Thirudan. In 1959, she bought her first home in Royapettah on Pachaiappan Nayakkan Road. Three years later, she bought her first car, a Morris Eight.

== Career ==
She started as a group dancer in Chandralekha. Plays and one-scene appearances in films continued until N. S. Krishnan gave her a pivotal role in Nalla Thangai and then her real breakthrough came through Muktha Srinivasan's maiden venture Thamarai Kulam followed by Engal Kula Devi and Naalu Veli Nilam. Nagesh then recommended her to K. Balachander to star in Server Sundaram, after he had been impressed with her performance in the theatre show of the same name, and the film's success prompted more offers for the actress.

Kamal Haasan called her to feature in Thevar Magan while she was taking a break in Puttaparthi and from then until Virumaandi, Lakshmi has been a part of nearly all of Kamal Haasan productions and such was his confidence in her ability that he would ask the assistants to give her the dialogue and move away, confident that she would handle it on her own.

Before her death she was doing a role as Meenakshi's grandmother in the serial "Saravanan Meenakshi" in Vijay TV and also as Thulasi's grand mother in the serial "Thendral" in SunTV .

== Personal life ==
Lakshmi has mentioned that "marriage didn't appeal to her", and that her brothers' grandchildren and their kids are now regulars at her house.

Until the early 2000s, Lakshmi would move around town by driving but was forced to give it up after she broke her leg. On Sunday mornings she would visit Sai Kripa, a free medical centre in Chennai and help the staff.

== Death ==
S. N. Lakshmi died in Chennai on 20 February 2012, at the age of 85. She had a cardiac arrest in the early hours of 20 February 2012. She was taken to a hospital, where the doctors declared her dead. Her body was kept at her Saligramam residence in Chennai where film personalities paid tributes to her. Her cremation took place in her native town, Virudhunagar.

== Filmography ==
Year	Film	Role	Notes
1948	Chandralekha	Group Dancer	
1955	Doctor Savithri		
1955	Nalla Thangai	English Teacher	
1959	Thamarai Kulam		
1959	Engal Kuladevi	Valli	
1959	Naalu Veli Nilam		
1960	Baghdad Thirudan	Maharani	
1961	Panam Panthiyile		
1962	Avana Ivan	Amudhavalli	
1963	Thulasi Maadam		
1964	Server Sundaram	Sundaram's mother	
1964	Dheiva Thaai	Megala's grandmother	
1964	Naanal	Lakshmi	
1964	Karuppu Panam	Sattanathan's first wife	
1965	Panchavarna Kili	Meenakshi	
1965	Vaazhkai Padagu		
1965	Kaakum Karangal	Shankar's mother	
1966	Marakka Mudiyumaa?		
1966	Kodimalar	Maragatham	
1966	Chandhrodhayam	Maheshwari	
1966	Ramu	Kannamma	
1967	Anubavi Raja Anubavi	Manikkam's mother	
1967	Thaikku Thalaimagan	Meenakshi	
1967	Vivasayee	Sivagami	
1968	Lakshmi Kalyanam	Rajadurai's mother	
1968	Thirumal Perumai	Dancer's mother	
1968	Thaer Thiruvizha	Parvathi Ammal	
1968	Ethir Neechal		
1968	Teacheramma	Shankar's mother	
1968	Thamarai Nenjam	Narayanan's Mother	
1968	Ragasiya Police 115	Kamatchi	
1969	Iru Kodugal	Janaki's aunt	
1970	Raman Ethanai Ramanadi	Raman's grandmother	
1970	Maattukara Velan	Raghu's mother	
1970	En Annan	Murali's mother	
1970	Kaaviya Thalaivi	Suresh's mother	
1970	Nadu Iravil	Vadivambal	
1970	Enga Mama	Muralikrishnan's mother	
1971	Then Kinnam	Meenakshi	
1972	Dheivam	Valliyammai's Neighbor	
1972	Annamitta Kai	Gandhimathi	
1972	Naan Yen Pirandhen	Chinnamma	
1973	Vandhaale Magaraasi	Lakshmi's Mother	
1973	Pattikaattu Ponnaiya	Meenatchi	
1973	Komatha En Kulamatha	Arun's mother	
1973	Thirumalai Deivam	Blind boy’s mother	
1975	Ninaithadhai Mudippavan	Mohan's mother	
1975	Pattikkaattu Raja	Thangam	
1977	Indru Pol Endrum Vaazhga	Maya's mother	
1977	Navarathinam	Pangajethamma	
1978	Tripurasundari		
1978	Chittu Kuruvi	Raja's grandmother	
1985	Kanni Rasi	Lakshmipathi's mother	
1985	Deivapiravi		
1988	Ennai Vittu Pogaathe		
1988	Agni Natchathiram	Rajamma	
1988	Therkathi Kallan	Kallan's mother	
1990	Michael Madana Kama Rajan	Tripurasundari's grandmother	
1990	Salem Vishnu	Vishnu's mother	
1991	Thoothu Po Chellakkiliye		
1992	Thevar Magan	Periyaatha	
1992	Chinnavar	Muthu's mother	
1992	Thanga Manasukkaran	Chellakili's grandmother	
1992	Villu Pattukaran	Kalimuthu's mother	
1993	Amma Ponnu		
1993	Ejamaan	Midwife	
1994	Mahanadhi	Saraswathi Ammal	
1995	Muthu Kulikka Vaarieyala		
1995	Chinna Vathiyar		
1996	Aruva Velu	Velu's grandmother	
1996	Minor Mappillai	Ramu's grandmother	
1996	Priyam		
1997	Iruvar	Tamizhselvan's mother	
1998	Ninaithen Vandhai	Savithri's grandmother	
1998	Kaathala Kaathala	Noorjahan	
1998	Jeans	Meiyaththa's mother	
1999	Suriya Paarvai	Lakshmi's mother	
1999	Kallazhagar	Aandal's grandmother	
1999	Chinna Raja	Paatti	
1999	Sangamam	Meenu	
1999	Ponvizha	Ponni's grandmother	
1999	Manaivikku Mariyadhai	Pandian's grandmother	
2000	Vaanathaippola	Appatha	
2000	Thai Poranthachu	Parvathiammal	
2000	Kandukondain Kandukondain	Chinnatha	
2000	Ennavalle	Lakshmi's mother	
2001	Friends	Gautham's grandmother	
2001	Ninaikkatha Naalillai	Arun's grandmother	
2001	Kutty	Viruthamba	
2001	Poovellam Un Vasam		
2004	Virumaandi	Virumaandi's grandma	
2006	Kalvanin Kadhali	Haritha's grandmother	
2006	Mercury Pookkal		
2006	Perarasu		
2006	Vathiyar		
2008	Pirivom Santhippom		
2008	Kuruvi	Vetrivel's grandmother	
2008	Silambattam	Thamizh & Muthuvel's grandmother	
2010	Drohi		
2010	Vaada		
2011	Mahaan Kanakku	Orphanage Caretaker	

== TV serials ==
Year	Title	Role	Channel
2000	Balachandarin Chinnathirai		Raj TV
2001-2003	Alaigal	Chandrasekhar, Rajasekhar and Savithri's mother	Sun TV
2003-2007	Sorgam		Sun TV
2004-2006	Nimmathi		Sun TV
2005-2006	Alli Rajjiyam	Mangamma	Sun TV
2007	Paasam		Sun TV
2007-2009	Vaira Nejam	Sakthi's Grandmother	Kalaignar
2007-2008	Namma Kudumbam	Raja's grandmother	Kalaignar
2008-2009	Kalasam	Neelambari and Ranjini's grandmother	Sun TV
2009-2012	Thendral	Thulasi's Grandmother	Sun TV
2010-2012	Mundhanai Mudichu	Kandhaswamy's mother	Sun TV
2011-2012	Saravanan Meenatchi	Meenakshi's Grandmother	STAR Vijay
