= Sport and Pastime =

Sports magazine

Sport and Pastime was a weekly sports magazine published by The Hindu Group from 1947 to 1968. Founded by S. K. Gurunathan, the magazine was eventually stopped in 1968. It was replaced with Sportstar in 1978.
