= Pattukkottai Kalyanasundaram =

Indian Tamil poet and lyricist

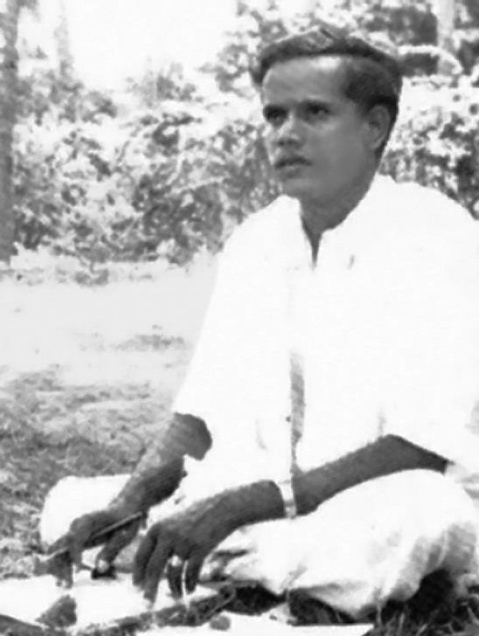
- Born: Kalyanasundaram; 13 April 1930; Thamarankottai, composite Tanjore District, Madras Presidency, British India (now Thanjavur District, Tamil Nadu, India)
- Died: 8 October 1959 (aged 29); Madras, Madras State (now Chennai, Tamil Nadu), India
- Occupations: poet, lyricist, activist
- Spouse: Gowrawammal
- Children: Kumaravelu
- Writing career
- Language: Tamil
- Period: 1930–1959
- Literary movement: Dravidian movement, Communism

Pattukkottai Kalyanasundaram (13 April 1930 – 8 October 1959) also known as Pattukottaiyar was an Indian Tamil poet and lyricist, penning over 250 songs within a six year period. He is best known for writing various song lyrics for M. G. Ramachandran’s movies from the year 1956 until his death in 1959. These lyrics were recognized for their social commentary and their connection to Ramachandran, who later became a Chief Minister.

== Early life ==
Pattukottaiyar was born on April 13, 1930 in Sengam Padaithan Kadu, a small village located southeast of the town of Pattukkottai, Thanjavur District. His parents Arunachalam Pillai and Visalakshi Ammal were farmers and could not give Pattukottaiyar a formal education. However, throughout his childhood, he learned how to read and write thanks to his father who was formally a Tamil scholar and folk poet. Pattukottaiyar also had an elder brother, Ganapathisundaram and a sister, Vedhanayaki.

== Career ==
Prior to his movie career, Kalyanasundaram worked for Kuyil, a Tamil magazine run by his mentor, Bharathidasan.

He first wrote lyrics for a Tamil movie Paditha Penn, penning five songs that were released ahead on November 13th, 1955 under the music director, G. Ramanathan. The following year he wrote for six movies including Paditha Penn and Pasavalai, both receiving moderate success.

As his career progressed, he was able to write for larger directors and took more liberty to write more political and social critiques through his songs, most notably with M. G. Ramachandran, an actor/director who moved on to become the 3rd Chief Minister of Tamil Nadu in the 1980s.

Kalyanasundaram was active in the Tamil film industry during the years 1954–1959 and wrote around 250 songs, including several songs for two leading Tamil movie stars of that period – MGR and Sivaji Ganesan.

== Later life ==
He married a woman named Gowravammal from a village neighboring his home town, Athikkottai. His mentor Bharathidasan presided over his marriage on September 11, 1957 in Madras, India. In 1959, the couple gave birth to a baby, named Kumaravelu. After suffering severe migraine attacks, Kalyanasundaram underwent surgery on his nose in September 1959. A few days following the operation, he died of a cerebral haemorrhage on 8 October 1959, at the age of 29.

== List of films for which Kalyanasundaram wrote lyrics ==
1. Maheswari (1955)
2. Paditha Penn (1956)
3. Pasavalai (1956)
4. Marma Veeran (1956)
5. Kula Dheivam (1956)
6. Paasavalai (1956)
7. Rangoon Radha (1956)
8. Chakravarthi Thirumagal (1957)
9. Makkalai Petra Magarasi (1957)
10. Allavudeenum Arputha Vilakkum (1957)
11. Karpukkarasi (1957)
12. Sowbagyawathi (1957)
13. Aaravalli (1957)
14. Ambikapathy (1957)
15. Mahadhevi (1957)
16. Pudhaiyal (1957)
17. Kanniyin Sabatham (1958)
18. Uthama Puthiran (1958)
19. Pillai Kaniyamudhu (1958)
20. Petra Maganai Vitra Annai (1958)
21. Thedi Vandha Selvam (1958)
22. Thirumanam (1958)
23. Nadodi Mannan (1958)
24. Naan Valartha Thangai (1958)
25. Anbu Engey (1958)
26. Pathi Bakthi (1958)
27. Thanga Padhumai (1959)
28. Pandithevan (1959)
29. Nalla Theerpu (1959)
30. Kalyana Parisu (1959)
31. Kalyanikku Kalyanam (1959)
32. Pudhumai Penn (1959)
33. Vaazha Vaitha Deivam (1959)
34. Ulagam Sirikirathu (1959)
35. Aval Yaar (1959)
36. Bhaaga Pirivinai (1959)
37. Kan Thiranthathu (1959)
38. Amudhavalli (1959)
39. Thalai Koduthaan Thambi (1959)
40. Ponn Vilaiyum Boomi (1959)
41. Kalaivaanan (1959)
42. Irumbu Thirai (1960)
43. Rathinapuri Ilavarasi (1960)
44. Mahalakshmi (1960)
45. Sangili Devan (1960)
46. Ellorum Innaattu Mannar (1960)
47. Ondrupattal Undu Vazhvu (1960)
48. Aalukkoru Veedu (1960)
49. Paadhai Theriyudhu Paar (1960)
50. Veerakkanal (1960)
51. Arasilangkumari (1961)
52. Punar Jenmam (1961)
53. Thirudadhe (1961)
54. Kumara Raja (1961)
55. Vikramaadhithan (1962)
56. Ethaiyum Thangum Ithaiyam (1962)
57. Kalai Arasi (1963)
58. Maganey Kel (1965)

== Legacy ==
The first compilation of Kalyanasundaram's songs appeared in 1965 in printed form. Comparative studies and criticism have also been published in the form of books by several authors, such as Paa. Udayakumar, Ki. Sembiyan, Solomon Pappaiah, Irakuladasan, M. P. Manivel, Pandian, Paa. Veeramani and others.

Tamil Nadu Murpokku Ezhuthalar Sangam, brought out souvenirs on Pattukkottaiyaar's 50th, 56th and 60th birthdays. A bronze statue was unveiled at a busy junction in Pattukkottai town and a special souvenir was released on the statue unveiling ceremony in 1995..

The government of India brought out a souvenir on the occasion of the Silver Jubilee of India's Independence recognizing Mahakavi Subramaniya Bharathi, Pavendhar Bharathidasan and Makkal Kavignar Pattukkottai Kalyanasundaram as the three foremost Tamil poets of the 20th century.

In 1981, the Chief Minister of Tamilnadu, M. G. Ramachandran conferred posthumously the prestigious Bharathidasan Award to Pattukkottaiyaar. Later in 1993,the then Chief Minister Jayalalithaa declared nationalization of Pattukkottaiyaar's literary works. In 2000, a memorial structure, Pattukkottai Kalyanasundaram Manimandapam, was erected in Pattukkottai and was inaugurated by the then Chief Minister Muthuvel Karunanidhi.
