= N. M. Velappan =

Member-Tamil Nadu Legislative Assembly
- In office 1957–1962
- Succeeded by: S. S. Rajendran
- Constituency: Theni

Personal details
- Born: 14 February 1916
- Party: Indian National Congress
- Profession: Farmer

N. M. Velappan is an Indian politician and a former member of the Tamil Nadu Legislative Assembly. He hails from the village of Kottoor in the Theni district. He was educated at Uthamapalayam Board High School. Velappan belonged to the Indian National Congress party. In the 1957 Tamil Nadu Legislative Assembly elections, he contested and won from the Theni Assembly constituency and became a Member of the Legislative Assembly (MLA).

== Electoral Performance ==
=== 1957 ===
1957 Madras Legislative Assembly election: Theni
Party	Candidate	Votes	%	±%
INC	N. R. Thiagarajan	38,185	26.62%	
Independent	S. S. Rajendran	31,404	21.90%	
INC	N. M. Velappan	26,673	18.60%	
Independent	S. Arunachalam	15,308	10.67%	
Independent	A. Ayyanar (SC)	13,163	9.18%	
PSP	R. Suruliammal (SC)	10,731	7.48%	
Independent	P. Selvaraj (SC)	7,960	5.55%	
Margin of victory		6,781	4.73%	
Turnout		1,43,424	90.76%	
Registered electors		1,58,034		
INC win (new seat)				
