= Pudhumai Penn =

Pudhumai Penn (lit. 'Modern woman') may refer to these Indian Tamil-language films:

- Pudhumai Penn (1959 film)
- Pudhumai Penn (1984 film)
