= G. Ponnu Pillai =

G. Ponnupillai

Member of the Legislative Assembly, Tamil Nadu Legislative Assembly
- In office 1989–1991
- Preceded by: V. R. Jayaraman
- Succeeded by: R. Nedunchezhiyan
- Constituency: Theni

Personal details
- Born: 16 September 1937 Upparpatti
- Party: DMK
- Education: Madurai, Madurai College
- Profession: Social worker

G. Ponnupillai is an Indian politician and a former member of the Tamil Nadu Legislative Assembly. He was elected as a member of the Theni Assembly constituency representing the DMK party in the 1989 assembly election. Hailing from Upparpatti near Theni, he served as a Member of the Legislative Assembly until 1991. He served as the president of the Upparpatti village panchayat for many years.
