= S. S. Rajendran =

Indian actor and politician (1928–2014)

Member of the Tamil Nadu Legislative Assembly
- In office 9 June 1980 – 15 November 1984
- Chief Minister: M. G. Ramachandran
- Political Party: AIADMK
- Preceded by: K. Kandasamy
- Succeeded by: M. G. Ramachandran
- Constituency: Andipatti
- In office 29 March 1962 – 28 February 1967
- Chief Minister: M. Bhaktavatsalam
- Political Party: DMK
- Preceded by: N. M. Velappan and N. R. Thiagarajan
- Succeeded by: P. T. R. Palanivel Rajan
- Constituency: Theni

Personal details
- Born: Sedapatti Suryanarayanan Rajendran; 1 January 1928 Usilampatti, Madras Presidency, British India
- Died: 24 October 2014 (aged 86) Chennai, Tamil Nadu, India
- Spouses: Pankajam; C. R. Vijayakumari; Thamarai Selvi
- Children: 8
- Parent(s): Father : Suryanarayanan Devar; Mother : Aadhilakshmi
- Occupation: Actor, director, producer, politician

Sedapatti Suryanarayanan Rajendran, also known by his initials SSR (1 January 1928 – 24 October 2014), was an Indian actor, film director, film producer and politician who worked in Tamil theatre and cinema. He is also referred to as Latchiya Nadigar.

He was a Rajya Sabha MP of Dravida Munnetra Kazhagam from April 3, 1970 to April 2, 1976

== Film career ==
Sri Aandal was to have his debut film as an actor. He received an offer to act in a negative role, and an advance as well. T. R. Sundaram, who oversaw the production, overruled Rajendran's selection because he "appeared like a boy with curly hair and was unsuitable for the villain role." Rajendran was cast in the title role. He was replaced after two weeks of shooting from the film as T. K. Muthusamy of the TKS Brothers drama troupe said Rajendran was still under contract with them, and threatened legal action if the film continued production. The role went to newcomer S. M. Kumaresan.

Rajendran made his acting debut with the 1952 film Parasakthi. He followed with Sorgavasal (1954), Ammaiyappan (1954), Ratha Kanneer (1954), Kula Dheivam (1956), Sivagangai Seemai (1957), Mudhalali (1957), Thai Pirandhal Vazhi Pirakkum (1958), Pillai Kaniyamudhu (1958), Thedi Vandha Selvam (1958), Kalyanikku Kalyanam (1959), President Panchaksharam (1959), Thalai Koduthaan Thambi (1959), Kumudham (1961), C. N. Annadurai's Ethaiyum Thangum Ithaiyam (1962), M. Karunanidhi's Kaanji Thalaivan (1963), Poompuhar (1964), Poomalai (1965), Avan Pithana? (1966) and Mani Magudam (1966).

SSR acted with M. G. Ramachandran in Raja Desingu (1960) and in Kaanji Thalaivan (1963). He had worked in many films with Sivaji Ganesan such as Manohara (1954), Raja Rani (1956), Rangoon Radha (1956), Deivapiravi (1960), Aalayamani (1962), Kunkhumam (1963), Pachai Vilakku (1964), Kai Kodutha Dheivam (1964), Pazhani (1965), Santhi (1965) and Ethiroli (1970).

His drama company SSR Nadaka Mandram staged plays includingOr Iravu (C. N. Annadurai), Manimagudam (M. Karunanidhi) and Thenpaandi Veeran (P. Nedumaran). He introduced and gave opportunities to actress Manorama. Rajendran, being a strict follower of Periyar's policy of rationalism, never acted in films based on Ithihasas and Puranas. He earned the sobriquet "Latchiya Nadigar" (Idealistic Actor) as he never acted in films against his policy.

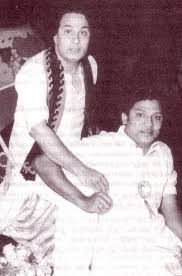
S.S. Rajendran with M.G.R.

== Personal life ==
He had two wives, Pankajam. and actress C. R. Vijayakumari, and eight children.

== Political life ==
He joined the Dravida Munnetra Kazhagam (DMK) party and became the first actor to be elected to a legislative assembly in India when he was elected to the Tamil Nadu legislative assembly as a DMK candidate for the Theni constituency in the 1962 Madras State legislative assembly election. He joined the All India Anna Dravida Munnetra Kazhagam (AIADMK) and was elected from Andipatti constituency in the 1980 assembly election..

He contested the 1984 assembly election in his native town Sedapatti as an independent candidate, but ultimately lost. S. Rajendran entered the electoral fray from Periyakulam in the 1989 Tamil Nadu Legislative Assembly election as a candidate of the AIADMK faction led by J. Jayalalithaa. But he could not win.

== Death ==
Rajendran was admitted to Chennai Meenakshi hospital on 20 October 2014 for treatment of a lung infection. He died on 24 October 2014.

== Filmography ==
=== Actor ===
Year	Film	Role	Notes	Ref.
1952	Parasakthi	Gnanasekaran		
1952	Panam	Sundaram		
1954	Manohara	Rajapriyan		
1954	Sorgavasal	Muthu Manikam		
1954	Ammaiyappan	Muthan		
1954	Ratha Kanneer	Balu		
1956	Raja Rani	Babu		
1956	Kuladeivam	Rajaiya		
1956	Rangoon Radha	Nagasundaram		
1957	Mudhalali	Vasanthan/Varathan		
1958	Thai Pirandhal Vazhi Pirakkum	Rangan		
1958	Anbu Engey	Somu		
1958	Petra Maganai Vitra Annai	Prince Villalan/Neelan		
1958	Pillai Kaniyamudhu			
1958	Thirudargal Jakkirathai			
1958	Thedi Vandha Selvam			
1959	Mamiyar Mechina Marumagal			
1959	Koodi Vazhnthal Kodi Nanmai			
1959	Sollu Thambi Sollu			
1959	Kalyanikku Kalyanam	Sadhasivam		
1959	Sivagangai Seemai	Muthalagu Servai		
1959	Pudhumai Penn			
1959	President Panchatcharam	Sikhamani		
1959	Naatukoru Nallaval			
1959	Alli Petra Pillai			
1959	Thalai Koduthaan Thambi	Indrajith		
1959	Odi Vilaiyaadu Paapa	Subramaniyan		
1960	Deivapiravi	Ramu		
1960	Sangilithevan	Sangilithevan		
1960	Raja Desingu	General Mohammed Khan		
1960	Petra Manam			
1960	Thangarathinam			
1961	Manapanthal	Dr. Gunasekaran		
1961	Mamiyarum Oru Veetu Marumagale			
1961	Kumudham	Kumaran		
1961	Panam Panthiyile			
1962	Sarada	Sambandham		
1962	Ethaiyum Thangum Ithaiyam			
1962	Senthamarai			
1962	Muthu Mandapam			
1962	Aalayamani	Sekar		
1962	Deivathin Deivam	Babu		
1963	Vanambadi	Sekhar		
1963	Neengadha Ninaivu			
1963	Kattu Roja	Baskaran		
1963	Aasai Alaigal	Durai Raj		
1963	Naanum Oru Penn	Bhaskar		
1963	Kunkhumam	Superintendent Raja		
1963	Kaanchi Thalaivan	Commander Paranjothi		
1963	Kaithiyin Kathali			
1964	Pachchai Vilakku	Pasupathy		
1964	Alli	Kannan		
1964	Kai Kodutha Deivam	Ravi		
1964	Vazhi Piranthadu			
1964	Poompuhar	Kovalan		
1964	Ullasa Payanam	Selvam		
1965	Pazhani	Raju		
1965	Santhi	Ramu		
1965	Paditha Manaivi			
1965	Kaakum Karangal	Dr. Shankar		
1965	Vazhikatti			
1965	Poomalai	Sundaram		
1965	Maganey Kel			
1965	Anandhi	Somu		
1966	Avan Pithana?	Kumar		
1966	Thedi Vandha Thirumagal			
1966	Marakka Mudiyuma?	Manikam / Krishnan		
1966	Thaaye Unakkaga			
1966	Mani Magudam	King Mani Maaran / Puthumai Pithan		
1969	Kula Vilakku		Guest Appearance	
1970	Ethiroli	Raju		
	Vairagyam			
1982	Erattai Manithan	Durai		
1985	Anbin Mugavari			
1996	Rajali	Shekhar		
1998	Dharma	Chief Minister		
2001	Rishi	Chief Minister		
2003	Dum	DGP		
2008	Theekuchi	Raja		
