= Kalyanikku Kalyanam =

- Poster
- Directed by: A. S. A. Sami
- Screenplay by: Aru. Ramanathan
- Story by: Aru. Ramanathan
- Produced by: M. Somasundaram
- Starring: S. S. Rajendran; M. N. Rajam; Prem Nazir; Mynavathi
- Cinematography: P. Ramasamy
- Edited by: A. Thangarajan
- Music by: G. Ramanathan
- Production company: Manohar Pictures
- Distributed by: Neptune
- Release date: 23 April 1959
- Country: India
- Language: Tamil

Kalyanikku Kalyanam (transl. Marriage to Kalyani) is a 1959 Indian Tamil-language film directed by A. S. A. Sami. The film stars S. S. Rajendran, Mynavathi and M. N. Rajam.

== Plot ==
Kalyani is an uneducated village girl who lives with her mother and two brothers. Her uncle Kumaresan agrees to Kalyani marrying his son Sadhasivam who is a master's degree qualified person living in Chennai. At first Sadhasivam wonders how an uneducated woman could be his wife, but when he visits the village and finds Kalyani's beauty and intelligence, he agrees to marry her. Kumaresan tells Kalyani's mother that she should give 10 thousand rupees cash and jewellery worth the same amount should be given as dowry. Earlier Kalyani's deceased father had given 25 thousand rupees cash and 10 thousand rupees worth jewellery to a Pannaiyar (Landed proprietor) for safe-keeping. Pannaiyar has an eye on Kalyani to take her as his second wife. Kalyani's elder brother Sundaram asks Pannaiyar for the jewellery and 10 thousand rupees cash for Kalyani's marriage. Pannaiyar gives only ₹7000. Sundaram does not want to go home without the requisite amount. He goes to Chennai vowing that he will earn sufficient amount and return. But in Chennai he loses all his money in horse racing. He meets a rich girl Susheela at the race course and goes to work as a manager in her bungalow. Susheela loves him and they get married, even though Susheela is from a different caste. In the meantime, Kalyani's mother mortgages the house to Pannaiyar and conducts Kalyani's marriage.
A dance program by Bharatham Pattammal takes place during the ceremony. Pannaiyar, in connivance with the dancer, makes it known that the jewellery worn by Kalyani is not genuine gold, but only gilt. Kumaresan gets wild and says Kalyani should not enter his house without genuine jewellery. When his son Sadhasivam pleads, he sends him away to Banares for further studies.
Pannaiyar's younger brother Ramachandran takes pity for Kalyani and tells her that he will give the 10 thousand rupees for her. He plans to marry Kumaresan's daughter Kalaivani and demand 10 thousand rupees from Kumaresan as dowry. He joins Kumaresan's household feigning as a driver "Kader". He fools Kumaresan by staging a drama showing himself as a rich man. He marries Kalaivani. But on the very first night, Kumaresan finds out that he is not a rich man. He chases away both his daughter Kalaivani and Ramachandran.
Kalyani loses her eyesight when firing a cracker on Deepavali day. Kalyani's mother dies due to shock. Blind Kalyani is left with her younger brother Mani. Hearing this, Sundaram comes back to the village with his wife Susheela. Sundaram asks Susheela to give her jewellery to Kalyani. But Susheela refuses and takes Sundaram back to Chennai. Panniyar takes over Kalyani's house in lieu of the loan. Kalyani and Mani goes to Chennai and seek asylum in Kumaresan's house. But he is adamant and says she can step into the house only with the jewellery.
Meanwhile, the dancer Bharatham Pattammal snatches the original jewellery from Pannaiyar.
Sadhasivam returns home after completing his higher studies.
How everything is sorted out forms the rest of the film.

== Cast ==
Cast according to the song book.

Male cast

- S. S. Rajendran as Sadhasivam
- Prem Nazir as Sundaram
- K. A. Thangavelu as Ramachandran
- T. S. Balaiah as Thiruppugazh Kumaresan
- V. K. Ramasamy as Landlord
- V. R. Rajagopal as Jalra Jambulingam
- M. R. Saminathan as Taxi Driver
- A. M. Maruthappa as Dharmalingam Pillai
- Master Babuji as Mani

Female cast

- M. Mynavathi as Kalyani
- M. N. Rajam as Susheela
- G. Sakunthala as Kalaivani
- Ragini as Bharatham Pattammal
- K. Malathi as Parvathi Ammal
- Lakshmiprabha as Annapoorani
- S. N. Lakshmi as Pappammal

== Soundtrack ==
Music was composed by G. Ramanathan.

Song	Singer/s	Lyricist	Duration (m:ss)
"Thai Porandha Vazhi Porakum"	T. M. Soundararajan, V. R. Rajagopalan, P. Leela, A. P. Komala, A. G. Rathnamala, K. Jamuna Rani, Kamala & group	Pattukkottai Kalyanasundaram	03:20
"Aanandam Inru Aarambam"	M. L. Vasanthakumari & P. Leela	Pattukkottai Kalyanasundaram	04:54
"Kuttukalai Sollanumaa"	T. M. Soundararajan, P. Leela, K. Jamuna Rani & Kamala	Pattukkottai Kalyanasundaram	
"Varushathile Oru Naalu Deepavali"	T. M. Soundararajan, A. P. Komala & P. Leela	Pattukkottai Kalyanasundaram	03:25
"Unnai Ninaikkayile"	T. M. Soundararajan	Pattukkottai Kalyanasundaram	02:28
"Indha Maanilathai Paaraai Magane"	P. B. Sreenivas & P. Susheela	Pattukkottai Kalyanasundaram	02:52
"Nee Anji Nadungathaedoi"	A. G. Rathnamala & A. P. Komala	Ku. Ma. Balasubramaniam	
"Mannaadhi Mannarellaam"	Sirkazhi Govindarajan & V. R. Rajagopalan	Thanjai N. Ramaiah Dass	
