= P. S. Veerappa =

Indian actor

- Born: Pollachi Sinnappan Mudaliyar Veerappan; 10 September 1911; Pollachi, Madras Presidency, British India (now in Tamil Nadu, India)
- Died: 11 September 1998 (aged 87); Chennai, Tamil Nadu, India
- Other name: Kodura Villan
- Occupations: Actor, Producer
- Years active: 1939-1998
- Spouse: Veeralakshmi
- Children: 2
- Parent(s): Father : Sinnappan Mudaliyar; Mother : Pappammal
- Awards: Kalaimamani, Rajiv Gandhi Award

Pollachi Sinnappan Veerappan, known by his stage name P. S. Veerappa, (10 September 1911 – 11 September 1998) was an Indian, Tamil actor and a producer of Tamil cinema.

== Early life ==
Born in 1911 Veerappa birth Pollachi Parents Sinnappan Mudaliyar-Pappammal belonged to Kangeyam, then part of Old Coimbatore District in Madras Presidency. But he grew up in his grandfather’s house in Pollachi right from an early age. He was interested in studies but there were no income sources due to large members in family. He tried many small trading business which never gave him good returns. Before moving to Madras he used to act in plays which was conducted in temple festival in nearby temple town Sivanmalai where he saw K. B. Sundarambal and her brother. They insisted him to join cinema and told him to come to Madras. So he moved to Madras with the aim of joining cinema; he expressed his desire to her and Sundarambal sent him to Ellis R. Dungan with a recommendation letter.

== Career ==
Duncan was directing the film Manimekalai at that time in which Sundarambal had an important role. And, Veerappa was introduced to cinema through that film in 1939. His next films were Udayanan Vasavadatta, in which G. N. Balasubramaniam and Vasundhara Devi were the lead pair and Jupiter Pictures’ Sri Murugan with C. Honnappa Bhagavathar as the hero. M. G. Ramachandran was also in the cast and Veerappa and became friends with him after this film. Their duo acted in many films together as hero and villain. Veerappa’s popular laughter "ha ..ha ..haa .." was first tried in the film Chakravarthi Thirumagal in which MGR was the hero. As it had tremendous response, it was continued by Veerappa in all his subsequent films and it became his trademark. In the film Vanjikottai Valiban, there is a dance sequence in which Vyjayanthimala and Padmini are both dancing, challenging each other in the song Kannum Kannum Kalanthu. In this scene, Veerappa shouts, "Sabhaash … sariyana potti …", welcoming the challenge. And, in another film Mahadhevi, Veerappa, the villain, would chase the heroine K. Savithri with so much lust. In the scene in which he realizes that he could never get Savithri, he would say, "Manadhaal Mahadevi, illaiyel maranadevi …". This dialogue gets consistent claps from the audience even today. .

He was associated with six Chief Ministers (C. N. Annadurai, M. Karunanidhi, M. G. Ramachandran, N. T. Rama Rao, V. N. Janaki & J. Jayalalithaa) as an actor and producer.

== Death ==
Veerappa died in Chennai on 11 September 1998, the day after he turned 87. He had a daughter and a son - film producer P. S. V. Hariharan.

== Filmography ==
=== As actor ===
Year	Movie name	Role
1939	Mani Mekalai	
1946	Sri Murugan	
1948	Raja Mukthi	
1948	Madhanamala	
1950	Marudhanaattu Ilavarasi	
1950	Ithaya Geetham	Prathaban
1952	Mappilllai	
1953	Naam	
1953	Madhana Mohini	
1953	Genova	
1954	Sorgavasal	
1954	Sugam Engey	Nagappan
1954	Ammaiyappan	
1955	Kaveri	
1955	Mullaivanam	
1955	Ulagam Pala Vidham	
1955	Pennarasi	
1956	Marma Veeran	
1956	Aasai	Veeran
1956	Alibabavum 40 Thirudargalum	Abhu Hussain
1957	Mahadevi	Karunakaran
1957	Magathala Nattu Mary	
1957	Chakravarthi Thirumagal	Bhairavan
1957	Rani Lalithangi	Gaandeepan
1957	Thangamalai Ragasiyam	Mahendran
1957	Raja Rajan	Nagavelan
1957	Yaar Paiyan	
1957	Neelamalai Thirudan	Zamindar Nagappan
1957	Pathini Deivam	
1958	Vanjikottai Valiban	Senapathy
1958	Nadodi Mannan	Raja Guru
1958	Boologa Rambai	Veera Kesari
1958	Neelavukku Neranja Manasu	
1958	Petra Maganai Vitra Annai	
1958	Panai Pidithaval Bhagyasali	
1958	Pillai Kaniyamudhu	
1959	Sivagangai Seemai	
1959	Thalai Koduthan Thambi	
1960	Mannadhi Mannan	Kanikannan
1960	Kaithi Kannayiram	Prisoner Jagatheeran (or) Prisoner No:420
1960	Veerakkanal	The King
1960	Parthiban Kanavu	Kabaligan
1960	Yanai Paagan	
1961	Marutha Nattu Veeran	
1962	Aalayamani	Pakkiri
1962	Vikramaadhithan	
1963	Anandha Jodhi	Jambu
1963	Veera Dhalapathi Veluthambi	
1963	Raj Mahal	
1963	Kalai Arasi	Kannan
1964	Andavan Kattalai	Prosecutor (Cameo Appearance)
1966	Yaar Nee?	CID Officer (Cameo Appearance)
1967	Arasa Kattalai	the King of the kingdom of Kumari
1969	Ponnu Mappillai	Dharma prakash
1971	Iru Thuruvam	Landlord
1975	Pallandu Vazhga	David/No:250
1977	Meenava Nanban	Selvaraj
1977	Navarathinam	Manarai
1978	Maduraiyai Meeta Sundarapandiyan	Thaigum Valavarai
1979	Thisai Maariya Paravaigal	
1979	Allavuthinum Arputha Vilakkum	
1984	Vetri	
1986	Karimedu Karuvayan	D.I.G
1988	Kaliyugam	
1990	Neengalum Herothan	As himself

=== As producer ===
Yeat	Film	Directors	Notes
1958	Pillai Kaniyamudhu	M. A. Thirumugam	
1960	Veerakkanal	G. K .Ramu	
1962	Aalayamani	K. Shankar	
1963	Anandha Jodhi	V. N. Reddy	
1964	Andavan Kattalai	K. Shankar	
1966	Yaar Nee	Sathyam	
1968	Aadmi	A Bhimsingh	Hindi
1969	Ponnu Maapillai	S. Ramanathan	
1971	Iru Thuruvam	S. Ramanathan	
1979	Thisai Maariya Paravaigal	S. Jagadeesan	
1980	Megathukkum Dhagam Undu	S. Jagadeesan	
1982	Pattanathu Rajakkal	S. A. Chandrasekhar	
1984	Vetri	S. A. Chandrasekhar	
1984	Kadamai	Rama Narayanan	
1984	Sabaash	Rama Narayanan	
1984	Vesham	Rama Narayanan	
1985	Mannukketha Ponnu	Ramarajan	
1986	Odangal	Ameerjan	
1986	Marakka Matten	Ramarajan	
1987	Thulasi	Ameerjan	
1991	Vanakkam Vaathiyaare	Ameerjan	
