= Iru Thuruvam =

1971 film by S. Ramanathan

- Theatrical release poster
- Directed by: S. Ramanathan
- Screenplay by: M. K. Ramu
- Story by: Dilip Kumar
- Produced by: P. S. Veerappa
- Starring: Sivaji Ganesan; Padmini; Muthuraman
- Cinematography: A. Vincent
- Edited by: A. Paul Duraisingam
- Music by: M. S. Viswanathan
- Production company: P. S. V. Pictures
- Release date: 14 January 1971
- Country: India
- Language: Tamil

Iru Thuruvam (transl. Two Poles) also transliterated as Iru Dhuruvam, is a 1971 Indian Tamil-language crime drama film, produced by P. S. Veerappa and directed by S. Ramanathan. The film stars Sivaji Ganesan, Padmini and Muthuraman, with Nagesh and Sundarrajan in supporting roles. It is a remake of the 1961 Hindi film Gunga Jumna, and revolves around two brothers who end up on opposite sides of the law. The film was released on 14 January 1971, and failed commercially.

== Plot ==
Brothers Rangan and Durai, grow up with a single mother taking care of them. Rangan wants Durai to become a police officer. He works hard allowing Durai only to study and not do any other work in the house or in the village. Life takes a turn when Durai goes for training with Naganathan, the zamindar, turning Rangan into a dacoit and criminal. When Durai comes back, he falls in love with Naganathan's daughter Kamala to complicate matters. In the end, Naganathan is arrested while Rangan dies bringing him to justice.

== Cast ==
- Sivaji Ganesan as Rangan
- Padmini as Thangam
- Muthuraman as Durai
- Rajasri as Kamala
- Pandari Bai as Annapoorani
- P. S. Veerappa as Naganathan
- Major Sundarrajan as a police officer
- V. S. Raghavan as a Jailer
- V. Nagayya as the teacher
- S. V. Ramadas as Madasamy
- Nagesh as Ayyasamy/Mama
- Senthamarai as Ramasamy
- K. Natarajan as Jameendar
- Seethalakshmi as Shanthanayaki
- A. Veerappan as Singaram
- Master Annadurai as Young Rangan
- Master Mohan as Young Durai
- Kowsalya as Young Thangam
- Baby Kumutha as Young Kamala
- Karuppu Subbaiya as Robbersing Gang
- S. A. Kannan as Iyer
- Comedy Shanmugam as Keady
- Shobana as Dancer

== Soundtrack ==
The music was composed by M. S. Viswanathan, with lyrics by Kannadasan.

Song	Singers	Length
"Agaram Thamizhukku"	Sirkazhi Govindarajan	03:26
"Mullai Poo Pole"	L. R. Eswari	04:17
"Rathiri Nadanthathai"	P. Susheela	04:27
"Theru Paarkka Vanthirukkum"	T. M. Soundararajan, P. Susheela	05:33
"Thullivarum Sooraikkatru"	Sirkazhi Govindarajan	03:07

== Release ==
Iru Thuruvam was released on 14 January 1971, and failed commercially.
