= Santhi (1965 film) =

- Theatrical release poster
- Directed by: A. Bhimsingh
- Screenplay by: M. S. Solaimalai
- Produced by: A. L. Srinivasan
- Starring: Sivaji Ganesan; S. S. Rajendran; C. R. Vijayakumari; Devika
- Cinematography: G. Vittal Rao
- Edited by: A. Paul Duraisingam
- Music by: Viswanathan–Ramamoorthy
- Production company: ALS Productions
- Distributed by: Sivaji Films
- Release date: 22 April 1965
- Country: India
- Language: Tamil

Santhi (/sɑːnθi/ transl. Peace) is a 1965 Indian Tamil-language film, directed by A. Bhimsingh and produced by A. L. Srinivasan. The film stars Sivaji Ganesan, S. S. Rajendran, C. R. Vijayakumari and Devika. It was released on 22 April 1965. The film was remade in Hindi as Gauri (1968).

== Cast ==
- Sivaji Ganesan as Santhanam
- S. S. Rajendran as Ramu
- M. R. Radha as Paramasivam Pillai
- Nagesh as Paramanandam
- Nagayya as Kailasam Pillai
- S. V. Sahasranamam as Doctor
- R. Vijayakumari as Santhi
- Devika as Malliga
- N. R. Sandhya as Santhanam's mother
- K. Manorama as Sundari
- Tambaram Lalitha as Nagamma

== Production ==
Santhi marked the final time Sivaji Ganesan and M. R. Radha appeared together onscreen.

== Soundtrack ==
The soundtrack was composed by Viswanathan–Ramamoorthy, with lyrics by Kannadasan. According to T. M. Soundararajan, when Viswanathan sang to him the tune of "Yaarantha Nilavu" that Soundararajan was supposed to sing, he was dumbstruck: "I was just too stunned and I wondered how I am going to sing it. It is impossible to sing like him". Ganesan who heard the song decided to postpone the shoot of this song as he wanted to prepare himself for performing in order to suit Soundarajan's style of rendition for this song.

Track listing
| No. | Title | Singer(s) | Length |
|---|---|---|---|
| 1. | "Yaarantha Nilavu" | T. M. Soundararajan | 4:32 |
| 2. | "Nenjathile Nee" | P. Susheela | 3:32 |
| 3. | "Oorengum Mappillai" | P. Susheela | 4:11 |
| 4. | "Senthur Murugan" | P. Susheela, P. B. Sreenivas | 4:54 |
| 5. | "Senthur Murugan" (2) | P. Susheela | 4:54 |
| 6. | "Vaazhnthu Paarkka" | T. M. Soundararajan, P. B. Sreenivas | 3:52 |
| 7. | "Theredu Silaiyedu" | P. Susheela | 3:18 |
| Total length: | | | 29:13 |

== Release and reception ==
Santhi was originally scheduled for release on 10 April 1965, but was instead released 12 days later because the Censor Board originally wanted to give the film an "A" (adults only) certificate. The makers of the film thought this would prevent people from bringing their families to the theatres and it took some time for them to get the film a "U" (universal) certificate. The film was distributed by Sivaji Films. Kalki appreciated the film for the cast performances.
