= Pillai Kaniyamudhu =

- Poster
- Directed by: M. A. Thirumugam
- Screenplay by: S. Ayyapillai
- Story by: K. P. Kottarakara
- Produced by: P. S. Veerappa
- Starring: S. S. Rajendran; E. V. Saroja; P. S. Veerappa; M. N. Rajam
- Cinematography: C. V. Moorthi
- Edited by: M. A. Thirumugam; M. Jagannathan
- Music by: K. V. Mahadevan
- Production company: P. S. V. Pictures
- Release date: 30 May 1958
- Running time: 165 minutes
- Country: India
- Language: Tamil

Pillai Kaniyamudhu is a 1958 Indian Tamil-language drama film directed by M. A. Thirumugam. The film stars S. S. Rajendran and E. V. Saroja. It was released on 30 May 1958.

== Plot ==
Satchidhanandam is a rich man who is outwardly a benevolent person, but in reality a very selfish man. He eyes Muthamma, daughter of his servant Muniyan. Muthamma is in love with Murugan, the gardener in the same household. They dream together of their married life and they both agree that their first child should be named Babu. Satchidhanandam chairs a dance performance by Mohana. After the program, he invites her to stay at his guest house. She agrees. Murugan is appointed to attend to her needs. One day, Satchidhanandam sends a fake message to Muthamma that her father Muniyan has fainted. Muthamma comes to his house. He tries to molest her, but she is rescued by Satchidhanandam's wife Gunavathi. When she comes out of the house, Murugan sees her and suspects her conduct. Another day, Mohana was chased by a leopard and when she faints, Murugan holds her. On seeing this, Muthamma becomes suspicious of Mohana. Mohana observes Murugan is morose and tries to enliven him by singing and dancing. Satchidhanandam did not like this. Mohana and Murugan run away from him and get married. Satchidhanandam sends some persons to abduct and bring Muthamma. Due to circumstances, he himself had to go and Muniyan dies at his hands. Satchidhanandam implicates his manager Marudasalam and sends him to jail on the murder charge. Muthamma is orphaned. She goes to live with Marudasalam's wife. Murugan and Mohana beget a baby boy. Murugan names him Babu. Differences crop up between the couple. During a scuffle between the two, Mohana tries to shoot Murugan, but the shot lands on her and she dies. Murugan takes his son with him and goes in search of Muthamma. He loses his eyesight in a car accident. He starts begging for a living. One day he sends Babu alone for begging. Muthamma meets him and learn his story. Babu brings Muthamma to his father. How everything is solved forms the rest of the story.

== Cast ==
The following list was adapted from the database of Film News Anandan.

- S. S. Rajendran
- P. S. Veerappa
- K. Balaji
- T. S. Balaiah
- S. V. Ranga Rao
- Sayeeram
- E. V. Saroja
- M. N. Rajam
- Sandhya
- Muthulakshmi

== Production ==
This was the first film produced by Veerappa.

== Soundtrack ==
Music was composed by K. V. Mahadevan.

Song	Singer/s	Lyricist
"Yer Munaikku Ner Inge"	T. M. Soundararajan	A. Maruthakasi
"Vazhi Maari Poguma"	T. M. Soundararajan	A. Maruthakasi
"Navaneedha Soranum Endru"	Jikki	A. Maruthakasi
"Azhagirukku Arivirukku"	Jikki	A. Maruthakasi
"Pillai Kaniyamudhu Onnu"	P. Susheela	A. Maruthakasi
"Aambala Manasu Pala Thinusu"	K. Jamuna Rani, L. R. Eswari, G. Kasthoori & Udutha Sarojini	A. Maruthakasi
"Sanga Thamizh Mozhi"	K. Jamuna Rani, L. R. Eswari, G. Kasthoori & Udutha Sarojini	A. Maruthakasi
"Pillai Kaniyamudhu Onnu"	Sirkazhi Govindarajan & P. Susheela	A. Maruthakasi
"Odugira Thanniyile"	Sirkazhi Govindarajan & P. Susheela	A. Maruthakasi
"Seevi Mudichukiddu Singaaram"	Sirkazhi Govindarajan & P. Susheela	Pattukkottai Kalyanasundaram
"Kaakkaaikkum Kaakkaaikum"	Group song	Pattukkottai Kalyanasundaram
