= Gauri (1968 film) =

- Theatrical release poster
- Directed by: A. Bhimsingh
- Starring: Sunil Dutt; Sanjeev Kumar; Nutan; Mumtaz
- Cinematography: K. S. Prasad
- Edited by: A. Paul Durai; Singham
- Music by: Ravi
- Production company: Sivaji Films P. Ltd.
- Release date: 1968
- Running time: 153 minutes
- Country: India
- Language: Hindi

Gauri is a 1968 Hindi film with an ensemble cast including super stars Sunil Dutt, Sanjeev Kumar, Nutan, Mumtaz and Om Prakash. It is a remake of the Tamil film Santhi (1965).

- Director – A Bhimsingh
- Producer – Shivaji Ganeshan
- Cinematographer – K S Prasad
- Music Director – Ravi
- Lyricist – Rajendra Krishan
- Screenplay – A Bhimsingh, Nanu Chandra
- Dialogues – Rajendra Krishan, Som Haksar
- Editor – A Paul Durai Singham

== Cast ==
- Sunil Dutt as Sunil
- Sanjeev Kumar as Sanjeev
- Nutan as Gauri
- Mumtaz as Geeta
- Om Prakash as Seth Maniram
- Rajendra Nath as Radhe Shyam
- Laxmi Chhaya as Dhanwanti
- Urmila Bhatt as Basanti
- Leela Mishra as Sunil's Mother
- Shivraj as Ram Prasad

== Soundtrack ==
Lyrics by Rajendra Krishan

Song	Singer
"Dil Mera Tumhari Adayen"	Mohammed Rafi
"Main Akela Ja Raha Tha"	Mohammed Rafi
"Log To Markar Jalte Honge"	Mohammed Rafi
"Mor Bole, Chakor Bole"	Lata Mangeshkar
"Baj Ri Mori Payaliya"	Asha Bhosle
"Pehle Wafa Ka Apni"	Asha Bhosle

== Reception ==
The film received a high rating of 6.7 at the IMDb.
