= Thisai Maariya Paravaigal =

- Theatrical release poster
- Directed by: S. Jagadeesan
- Screenplay by: P. L. Sundararajan
- Story by: S. Jagadeesan
- Produced by: P. S. Veerappa; P. S. V. Hari Haran
- Starring: Sarath Babu; Sumalatha
- Cinematography: N. Balakrishnan
- Edited by: K. Narayanan
- Music by: M. S. Viswanathan
- Production company: P. S. V. Pictures
- Release date: 19 October 1979
- Running time: 127 minutes
- Country: India
- Language: Tamil

Thisai Maariya Paravaigal (transl. The Birds that Changed Direction) is a 1979 Indian Tamil-language romantic drama film, directed by S. Jagadeesan who also wrote the story. It was produced by P. S. Veerappa and P. S. V. Hariharan under his productions P. S. V. Pictures. The film stars Sarath Babu and Sumalatha, in her debut film appearance. It was released on 19 October 1979, and won three Tamil Nadu State Film Awards.

== Plot ==
A harijan girl is brought up by a high-cast Brahmin in the agraharam, and the family is faced with antagonism and hatred. The girl's marriage to a Brahmin boy is thwarted, and out of frustration, she joins a nunnery.

== Cast ==
- Sarath Babu
- Sumalatha
- Major Sundarrajan
- V. S. Raghavan
- M. N. Rajam
- T. V. Kumudhini
- G. Srinivasan
- Veera Raghavan
- P. S. Veerappa
- Usilai Mani
- Vellai Subbaiah
- Thyagaraj
- Desikan
- P. P. Subbaiah
- Leela
- Rooba Mohan
- MLA Thangaraj

== Production ==
Thisai Maariya Paravaigal is Sumalatha's feature film debut. It was shot in Gobichettipalayam.

== Soundtrack ==
The soundtrack was composed by M. S. Viswanathan. The song "Raja Vaada Singakutti" is based on Kuntalavarali raga.

Songs	Singer	Lyrics	Length
"Adraa Melatha Rajaa"	Kovai Soundararajan & L. R. Eswari	Pulamaipithan	04:37
"Kizhakku Paravai Merkil"	T. M. Soundararajan	Kannadasan	05:02
"Raja Vaada Singakutti"	S. Janaki, P. Jayachandran	Kannadasan	04:13
"Neeradi Pattuduthi"	Vani Jairam	Kannadasan	04:32

== Reception ==
Kausikan of Kalki praised Jagadeesan's story and direction, the performances of cast, Balakrishnan's cinematography and Viswanathan's music. The film won the Tamil Nadu State Film Awards for Best Film (Second Prize), Best Story Writer (Jagadeesan), Best Male Playback Singer (T. M. Soundararajan), and Devar's New Face Award (Sumalatha).
