= Veerakkanal =

1960 film by G. K. Ramu

- Theatrical release poster
- Directed by: G. K. Ramu
- Written by: Kannadasan (dialogues)
- Produced by: P. S. Veerappa
- Starring: Gemini Ganesan; Anjali Devi
- Cinematography: G. K. Ramu
- Music by: K. V. Mahadevan
- Production company: P. S. V. Pictures
- Distributed by: P. S. V. Pictures
- Release date: 2 December 1960
- Running time: 147 minutes
- Country: India
- Language: Tamil

Veerakkanal (transl. Fire of Bravery) is 1960 Indian Tamil-language historical action film, directed by G. K. Ramu and produced by P. S. Veerappa. The film stars Gemini Ganesan and Anjali Devi, with M. Saroja, K. A. Thangavelu, Veerappa, M. N. Nambiar, M. N. Rajam and Kamala in supporting roles. It was released on 2 December 1960.

== Cast ==
- Gemini Ganesan as Parandhaman
- Anjali Devi as Rajathi
- M. Saroja as Ananthi
- K. A. Thangavelu as Santhosham
- P. S. Veerappa as The King
- M. N. Nambiar as Raghu Devan
- M. N. Rajam as Porkodi
- Kamala as Thenmozhi

== Soundtrack ==
Music was composed by K. V. Mahadevan and lyrics were written by Kannadasan, A. Maruthakasi and Pattukkottai Kalyanasundaram.

Song	Singer	Lyrics	Length (m:ss)
"Sirithukonde Irukkavendum"	P. Susheela	Kannadasan	4:30
"Silayodu Vilayadavaa"	P. Susheela	Kannadasan	05:41
"Poomudipathum Pottu Vaipathum"	P. Susheela	Kannadasan	03:31
"Piravigal Palakodi"	T. M. Soundararajan	A. MaruthaKasi	03:43
"Chithirame Chithirame"	P. Susheela & Sirkazhi Govindarajan	Kannadasan	03:07
"Thangakiliyae Mozhi Pesu"	P. Susheela & Sirkazhi Govindarajan	Kannadasan	03:26
"Kaikal Irandil Valai Kulunga"	Sirkazhi Govindarajan, P. Susheela, Thiruchi Loganathan & L. R. Eswari	Kannadasan	04:19
"Poomudipathum Pottu Vaipathum" (pathos)	P. Susheela	Kannadasan	03:09
"Pottukitta Rendu Perum"	Tiruchi Loganathan & L. R. Eswari	Pattukkottai Kalyanasundaram	03:31

== Release and reception ==
Veerakkanal was released on 2 December 1960, and was distributed by P. S. V. Pictures in Madras. The Indian Express called the film "a gorgeous costume piece and dance-cum music extravaganza designed to entertain", also praising the sword fights and stunts.
