= Kula Deivam (film) =

- Theatrical release poster
- Directed by: Krishnan–Panju
- Screenplay by: Murasoli Maran
- Based on: Banga Kora
- Starring: S. V. Sahasranamam; S. S. Rajendran; Pandari Bai
- Cinematography: Maruthi Rao
- Edited by: S. Panjabi
- Music by: R. Sudarsanam
- Production company: SK Pictures
- Release date: 29 September 1956
- Running time: 168 minutes
- Country: India
- Language: Tamil

Kula Deivam (transl. Family deity) is a 1956 Indian Tamil-language drama film directed by Krishnan–Panju and written by Murasoli Maran. It is a remake of the 1954 Bengali film Bhanga Gora. The film stars S. V. Sahasranamam, S. S. Rajendran and Pandari Bai, while Rajagopal, Chandrababu, S. A. Ashokan and Vijayakumari play supporting roles. The film's soundtrack and background score were composed by R. Sudarsanam. Maruthi Rao and Panju (under the alias S. Panjabi) handled cinematography and editing respectively.

Kula Deivam was released on 29 September 1956, and became a commercial success, winning the National Film Award for Best Tamil Feature Film. Bhanga Gora went on to be remade in Hindi as Bhabhi, in Telugu as Kula Daivam and in Kannada as Jenu Goodu. Pandari Bai reprised her role in both the versions.

== Plot ==
After the death of his father, Muthaiah is left with the responsibility to take care of his three young brothers, his aunt, and her daughter. With the help of his lawyer uncle, Muthaiah starts a textile business and by hard work forms a company and runs it well. He marries his aunt’s daughter Nalina who dies during delivery, leaving a son.

After a few months, on the insistence of his aunt and uncle, Muthaiah marries Santha, to take care of the child. Santha brings her young widowed sister Latha to live with them. Muthaiah's first young brother Ramaiah "Ramu" is a lawyer, the second brother Rajaiah "Raju" is studying to become a doctor and the last brother Chinnaiah stays with him. Muthaiah's son grows as a young boy Kanmani. Muthaiah's uncle has a son Jeeva and daughter Thara. He is keen to get Thara married to Ramaiah.

Not knowing this, Muthaiah agrees to get Ramaiah married to Mangalam, daughter of Sokkesan, working in his office. Realizing his uncle’s plan, Muthaiah agrees to marry his brother with Thara and decides to marry his second brother Raju to Mangalam. Raju who is totally against the concept of marriage agrees on Muthaiah's insistence. Both marriages take place.

When the newly married couples reach home, Latha welcomes them, which the relatives think as inauspicious and they influence Mangalam who behaves badly that night itself, which upsets Raju. Jeeva and Thara convince a reluctant Ramaiah to start his own business. They conspire with Mangalam and demand partition of the family’s wealth. Muthaiah gets upset and agrees to divide the wealth and Mangalam agrees to it without consulting her husband. Muthaiah gives his wealth away to his brothers and moves to Kanchivaram village with his family, Chinnaiah, aunt, and Latha. Jeeva steals cash from Ramaiah’s business leading to its collapse. Shocked, Muthaiahsettles the loans with Santha’s jewels in order to avoid a bad name for his company.

Raju, disappointed with Mangalam, discontinues his medical studies and turns a drunkard. Santha comes to know, meets, and reforms him and he joins the military. Meanwhile, Latha who considers her as a burden to her sister’s family returns to her elder brother-in-law’s house. Chinnaiah, in love with her, is disappointed and leaves to Mumbai for work. Latha is treated badly at her in-law's place and Babu, their son is her only support. Muthaiah meets with an accident and falls very sick. Santha does not have money and when she sends her son to get money, Jeeva does not help.

Meanwhile, Jeeva manipulates Mangalam to sign some documents and using that takes possession of her home and throws her out. Mangalam realizes her mistake and apologies to Muthaiah and Santha and they accept her into the family. Santha sends a telegram about Muthaiah's health to his brothers. Chinnaiah returns from Mumbai and meets his uncle on the same train who is returning after months from Kasi. His uncle understands how his children have spoilt Muthaiah's family and punish them for not understanding the value of a joint family. Both accept their mistakes.

They travel to meet Muthaiah who is very sick by then. In his death bed, he tells Santha to get Chinnaiah married to Latha and then dies. Raju returns and is shocked to know about the death of Muthaiah. He accepts Mangalam back on Santha’s advice. Chinnaiah marries Latha with Santha’s blessing and they all live happily together.

== Cast ==
Male cast

- S. V. Sahasranamam as Muthaiah
- S. S. Rajendran as Rajaiah
- M. K. Mustafa as Muthaiah
- V. R. Rajagopal as Chinnaiah
- D. Balasubramaniam as Kannappan
- T. R. Natarajan as Jeeva
- Duraisami as Karmegham
- Master Murali as Kanmani
- Chandrababu as Babu
- A. Karunanidhi as Latha's brother-in-law
- S. A. Ashokan as Doctor

Female cast

- M. Pandari Bai as Shantha
- M. N. Rajam as Thara
- C. R. Vijayakumari as Mangalam
- M. Mynavathi as Latha
- M. R. Santhanalakshmi
- P. S. Gnanam as Muthaiah's aunt
- K. S. Angamuthu as Neighbor
- D. Indira as Nalina

Dance

- Kumari Kamala

Male support cast

- P. S. Venkatachalam, Sethu, Kottapuli Jayaraman, A. S. Kannan, Ganapathi, Thiruvenkatam, Kittan and Pottai Krishnamoorthy.

== Production ==
Kula Deivam was remade from the 1954 Bengali film Bhanga Gara. It was directed by the duo Krishnan–Panju, and the dialogues were written by Murasoli Maran, making his cinematic debut. Stage actor V. R. Rajagopal, who appeared in this film, later adapted the film's title as a prefix to his name.

== Soundtrack ==
Soundtrack was composed by R. Sudharsanam and lyrics were written by Mahakavi Subramania Bharathiyar, Bharathidasan, Pattukkottai Kalyanasundaram, K. P. Kamatchi and M. K. Athmanathan. A Kriti composed by Oothukadu Venkata Subbaiyer, Thaaye Yasodha Undhan, was included in the film for a dance sequence of Kumari Kamala.

| Song | Singers | Lyrics | Length |
|---|---|---|---|
| "Thaaye Yasodaa Undhan Aayar Kulatthudhittha" | M. L. Vasanthakumari | | 05:42 |
| "Kottupotta Pota Chinna Machane" | P. Susheela | | 02:06 |
| "Aanum Pennum" | T. V. Rathnam | | 02:37 |
| "Kaiyaale Kannai.... Mudiyadhu Nanba Mudiyadhu" | T. M. Soundararajan | | 04:48 |
| "Inba Vargamellaam.... Vetkamillai Vetkamillai" | C. S. Jayaraman | Bharathidasan | 04:27 |
| "Kaadhal Kaadhal Kaadhal" | T. M. Soundararajan | | 03:34 |
| "Vaarayo Ennai Paaraayo" | T. V. Rathnam | | 03:10 |
| "Adiyaargal Ullatthile" (Pathar Vellai kootthu) | T. M. Soundararajan, Seerkazhi Govindarajan & M. M. Muthu | | 06:16 |
| "Sathiram Paarkatheer" | C. S. Jayaraman | | |

== Release ==
Kula Deivam was released on 29 September 1956, delayed from a 20 September release. The film was a commercial success, and ran for over 100 days in theatres. Randor Guy of The Hindu noted that the film was "Remembered for the socially relevant storyline, excellent performances by Sahasranamam and Pandari Bai, pleasing music and touching on-screen narration". The film won National Film Award for Best Feature Film in Tamil.
