= Paditha Penn =

- Directed by: M. Thiruvenkadam
- Screenplay by: A. S. Muthu
- Starring: N. N. Kannappa; M. N. Nambiar; Rajasulochana; Tambaram Lalitha
- Music by: Arun; Raghavan
- Production companies: Shyamala, Nalini Pictures
- Release date: 20 April 1956
- Running time: 153 minutes
- Country: India
- Language: Tamil

Paditha Penn (transl. Educated Woman) is a 1956 Indian Tamil-language film directed by M. Thiruvenkadam. The film stars N. N. Kannappa and Rajasulochana. It was released on 20 April 1956.

== Cast ==
List adapted from the database of Film News Anandan and from Thiraikalanjiyam.

Male cast

- N. N. Kannappa
- M. N. Nambiar
- V. K. Ramasamy

Female cast

- Rajasulochana
- Tambaram Lalitha
- Susheela

== Soundtrack ==
Music was composed by Arun and Raghavan. This is the first film Pattukkottai Kalyanasundaram wrote lyrics for, although his first release became Maheswari (1955).

Song	Singer/s	Lyricist
"Kadhiraadum Kazhaniyil Sadhiraadum Pennmani"	A. M. Rajah & Jikki	Pattukkottai Kalyanasundaram
"Kaappi Onnu Yettanaa"		Pattukkottai Kalyanasundaram
"Vaadaadha Solai Malar Pootha Verlai"	Thiruchi Loganathan & K. Rani	Pattukkottai Kalyanasundaram
"Gunamum Kula Dharma Gnaanamum"	Thiruchi Loganathan & K. Rani	Kavi Lakshmanadas
"Irul Soozhndha Ulaginile"	N. L. Ganasaraswathi	Kavi Lakshmanadas
"Vaazhvinile Kaanaene Inbam"	N. L. Ganasaraswathi	Aroordas
"Kannaana Selvame Ponnaana"	S. C. Krishnan	Thanjai N. Ramaiah Dass
