= Theni Assembly constituency =

Former constituency in Tamil Nadu, India

Coordinates: 10.01°N 77.47°E

Theni
- Former constituency for the Tamil Nadu Legislative Assembly

Constituency details
- Country: India
- Region: South India
- State: Tamil Nadu
- District: Theni
- Lok Sabha constituency: Periyakulam
- Established: 1957
- Abolished: 2008
- Reservation: None

Theni was a state assembly constituency in Theni district in Tamil Nadu. The constituency was in existence from the 1957 election until 2008.

== Members of the Legislative Assembly ==
Year	Winner	Party
Madras State
1957	N. M. Velappan	Indian National Congress
1957	N. R. Thiagarajan	Indian National Congress
1962	S. S. Rajendran	Dravida Munnetra Kazhagam
1967	P. T. R. Palanivel Rajan	Dravida Munnetra Kazhagam
Tamil Nadu
1971	P. T. R. Palanivel Rajan	Dravida Munnetra Kazhagam
1977	V. R. Jayaraman	All India Anna Dravida Munnetra Kazhagam
1980	V. R. Jayaraman	All India Anna Dravida Munnetra Kazhagam
1984	V. R. Jayaraman	All India Anna Dravida Munnetra Kazhagam
1989	G. Ponnu Pillai	Dravida Munnetra Kazhagam
1991	V. R. Nedunchezhiyan	All India Anna Dravida Munnetra Kazhagam
1996	N. R. Alagaraja	Tamil Maanila Congress
2001	D. Ganesan	All India Anna Dravida Munnetra Kazhagam
2006	D. Ganesan	All India Anna Dravida Munnetra Kazhagam

== Election results ==
=== 1957 ===
1957 Madras Legislative Assembly election: Theni
Party	Candidate	Votes	%	±%
INC	N. R. Thiagarajan	38,185	26.62%	
Independent	S. S. Rajendran	31,404	21.90%	
INC	N. M. Velappan	26,673	18.60%	
Independent	S. Arunachalam	15,308	10.67%	
Independent	A. Ayyanar (SC)	13,163	9.18%	
PSP	R. Suruliammal (SC)	10,731	7.48%	
Independent	P. Selvaraj (SC)	7,960	5.55%	
Margin of victory		6,781	4.73%	
Turnout		1,43,424	90.76%	
Registered electors		1,58,034		
INC win (new seat)				
