= Mani Magudam =

1966 film by S. S. Rajendran

- Theatrical release poster
- Directed by: S. S. Rajendran
- Written by: M. Karunanidhi
- Based on: Mani Magudam by M. Karunanidhi
- Produced by: D. V. Narayanasami
- Starring: S. S. Rajendran; C. R. Vijayakumari; Jayalalithaa; M. N. Nambiar
- Cinematography: T. M. Sundarababu
- Edited by: R. Devarajan
- Music by: R. Sudarsanam
- Production company: S.S.R. Pictures
- Release date: 9 December 1966
- Running time: 128 minutes
- Country: India
- Language: Tamil

Mani Magudam is a 1966 Indian Tamil-language historical action film, directed by S. S. Rajendran and written by M. Karunanidhi. The film stars Rajendran, C. R. Vijayakumari, Jayalalithaa, and M. N. Nambiar. Based on Karunanidhi's play of the same name, it was released on 9 December 1966.

== Plot ==
A group of revolutionaries from Manimagudapuram raise a revolt against their king and try to establish democracy in their kingdom. However, they do not know that their king is a kindhearted man.

== Cast ==
- S. S. Rajendran as King Mani Maaran/Puthumai Pithan
- C. R. Vijayakumari as Alli
- Jayalalitha as Poongodi / Kalarani
- M. N. Nambiar as Raja Guru / Veera Mahendran
- S. A. Natarajan as Diwan Gunaselar
- Manorama as Vanchi
- A. Karunanidhi as Ulagappan, Vanchi's brother
- O. A. K. Thevar as Ponnazhagan,
- "En Thangai" Natarajan
- R. V. Udayappa as Marutheeran
- N. S. K. Kolappan as Azhangappan
- S. V. Sahasranamam in Guest appearance
- Nagesh as Anandhan in Guest appearance

== Production ==
Mani Magudam is based on Karunanidhi's play of the same name. While Rajendran, the lead actor of the play, reprised his role in the film adaptation, Manorama was replaced by Vijayakumari as the lead actress.

== Soundtrack ==
The music was composed by R. Sudarsanam.

Song	Singers	Lyrics	Length
"Aathavan Uthiththaan"	T. M. Soundararajan, P. Susheela	Kannadasan	04:09
"Naan Vantha Paathai"	T. M. Soundararajan	Vaali	03:19
"O Ho Paar Intha Pakkam"	P. Susheela	Kannadasan	03:11
"Valiyor Silar"	T. M. Soundararajan	Bharathidasan	03:10
"Thathi Sellum"	T. M. Soundararajan, P. Susheela	Vaali	03:10

== Reception ==
Kalki noted that, among the three roles portrayed by Rajendran, only the insane one was worth applauding.
