= Thedi Vandha Selvam =

- Theatrical release poster
- Directed by: P. Neelakantan
- Written by: M. S. Solaimalai
- Produced by: P. Neelakantan
- Starring: S. S. Rajendran; Rajasulochana; B. Saroja Devi
- Cinematography: V. Ramamurthy
- Edited by: V. P. Natarajan
- Music by: T. G. Lingappa
- Production company: Arasu Pictures
- Release date: 16 July 1958
- Country: India
- Language: Tamil

Thedi Vandha Selvam (transl. The son I came searching for) is a 1958 Indian Tamil-language drama film produced and directed by P. Neelakantan. The film stars S. S. Rajendran, Rajasulochana and B. Saroja Devi. It was released on 16 July 1958 and emerged a box office success.

== Cast ==
- S. S. Rajendran
- Rajasulochana
- B. Saroja Devi
- V. K. Ramasamy
- T. S. Balaiah
- T. K. Ramachandran
- Kuladeivam Rajagopal
- T. P. Muthulakshmi
- P. R. Mangalam
- Lakshmiprabha
- A. Karunanidhi
- D. Balasubramaniam
- M. A. Ganapathi
- P. S. Seethalakshmi
- P. S. Gnanam

== Production ==
P. Neelakantan produced and directed Thedi Vandha Selvam under his production company Arasu Pictures. The story and dialogues were written by M. S. Solaimalai, cinematography was handled by V. Ramamurthy and editing by V. P. Natarajan.

== Soundtrack ==
The music was composed by T. G. Lingappa. The songs "Panguni Poi Chithirai Vandhaa" and "Pakkathile Irruppey" were popular with audience. The song "Jallikattu Kaalai" was released on 78 RPM record only and was not included in the film.

Song	Singer	Lyrics	Length
"Panguni Poi Chitthirai Vandhaa"	T. M. Soundararajan, P. Susheela	Thanjai N. Ramaiah Dass	03:29
"Poovaadai Nee Enakku"	Sirkazhi Govindarajan, T. V. Rathnam	Thanjai N. Ramaiah Dass	02:46
"Pakkatthila Irruppey"	T. M. Soundararajan, L. R. Eswari	Pattukkottai Kalyanasundaram	03:15
"Plaatpaaram Mattaminnu Ennaatheenga"	S. C. Krishnan	A. Maruthakasi	02:52
"Namba Sarakku Romba Nalla"	T. M. Soundararajan	A. Maruthakasi	02:55
"Thangame Thangam"	P. Susheela, A. P. Komala	M. K. Athmanathan	03:28
"Ragasiyathilum Ragasiyam"	P. Leela	M. K. Athmanathan	02:50
"Jallikattu Kaalai"	T. M. Soundararajan, P. Susheela		03:29

== Release and reception ==
Thedi Vandha Selvam was released on 16 July 1958. The Indian Express wrote, "Admirable in technical values the film offers more than average entertainment". According to historian Randor Guy, the film was a box office success mainly due to praise for the music and the performances of Rajendran, Ramachandran, Ramasamy and Balaiah.
