= Vetri (film) =

- Theatrical release poster
- Directed by: S. A. Chandrasekaran
- Written by: S. N. Sundar
- Produced by: P. S. Veerappa
- Starring: Vijayakanth; Viji
- Cinematography: M. Kesavan
- Edited by: Gautham Raju
- Music by: Shankar–Ganesh
- Production company: P. S. V. Pictures
- Release date: 17 February 1984
- Running time: 128 minutes
- Country: India
- Language: Tamil

Vetri (transl. Victory) is a 1984 Indian Tamil-language action crime film directed by S. A. Chandrasekaran, starring Vijayakanth in the main lead role. The music was composed by Shankar–Ganesh. S. A. Chandrasekhar's son, Vijay, also plays a cameo role as a child artist, making it his first ever on-screen performance. The film was a remake of the director's own 1983 Kannada film Geluvu Nannade. The film was released on 17 February 1984.

== Plot ==
A young student, Vijay, loves challenges and bets, and uses any means to win them. He makes a bet with his friend, Arun a fellow prankster, and cruelly in order to win the challenge, captures a girl named Shanti inside a guest house for three days. For this prank, Arun is expelled from college by Professor Ramanajam.

In a subsequent scene, a young woman called Lalitha goes to the teacher's house and gets raped by him, then commits suicide in despair.

Appusami, Lalitha's brother, wants revenge for his sister's death, and asks his friend Vijay to kill the rapist Ramanajam. Unbeknownst to them, Vijay's friend Arun is listening into their conversation, and also wants revenge.

Vetri goes to the rapist's house, but cannot do it - he asks Ramanajam to pretend to be dead instead. Arun arrives, and Vetri tells him that Appusami asked him to kill for a challenge. Arun kills the teacher without anyone knowing it and escapes.

While Vetri is being prosecuted by the police, it is Arun's father, Dharmaraj, who reveals that the rapist has been killed. Vetri is accused in court, but he reports that when he was a child, he denounced Dharmaraj for an attempt on his father, but the judge did not act, and the accusation is part of a scheme. Finally, the supreme court releases him, and Vetri is pardoned and was released.

== Cast ==
- Vijayakanth as Vijay (Vetri)
  - Vijay as young Vijay
- Viji as Shanti
- Raja as Arun
- Anuradha
- Y. G. Mahendran as Appusami
- Vennira Aadai Moorthy as Professor Ramanajam
- S. S. Chandran
- Pandari Bai as Vijay's mother
- Vijayalakshmi as Lalitha
- Idichapuli Selvaraj
- Kullamani as Mani
- M. N. Nambiar as Commissioner Chandrasekharan
- P. S. Veerappa as Dharmaraj
- V. Gopalakrishnan as Vijay's father

== Production ==
Chandrasekhar initially planned to remake his Kannada film Geluvu Nannade as Vetri Namadhe with Vijayakanth and Mohan in lead roles; however the project was shelved after Mohan left the film. The film was launched at Prasad Studios along with song recording in 1983.

== Soundtrack ==
All songs were composed by Shankar–Ganesh.

Title	Singer(s)	Length
"Oorengum"	S. N. Surendar, Vani Jairam	04:10
"Aathi Aathi"	S. N. Surendar	04:26
"Kaaval Purinthavan"	S. N. Surendar, Vani Jairam	03:40
"Munthaa Naa"	Vani Jairam	04:40
"Thai Mel Aanai"	Malaysia Vasudevan	04:16

== Reception ==
Jayamanmadhan of Kalki praised the performances of Y. G. Mahendran and Vennira Aadai Moorthy.
