= Madhanamala =

- Theatrical release poster
- Directed by: K. Vembu
- Screenplay by: C. S. Varadarajan; P. A. Kumar
- Story by: K. Vembu
- Produced by: S. Soundararajan
- Starring: Sriram; T. R. Ranjani; P. B. Rangachari; Vidwan Srinivasan
- Cinematography: V. Kumaradevan
- Edited by: R. Rajagopal
- Music by: M. S. Gnanamani
- Production company: Tamil Nadu Talkies
- Distributed by: Sri Ramanantha Pictures
- Release date: 12 December 1948
- Country: India
- Language: Tamil

Madhanamala is a 1947 Tamil language film starring Sriram, T. R. Rajani, P. B. Rangachari, Vidwan Srinivasan, P. S. Veerappa, R. N. Nambiar, S. R. Janaki, T. S. Jaya, V. Rajalakshmi and V. Kumar. The film was directed by K. Vembu and produced by S. Soundararajan of Tamil Nadu Talkies.

== Plot ==
The story revolves around Vikraman, a young man who asks for the celebrated court dancer Madhanamala during celebrations organised by a king who offers a gift to all those present. As a result, the king gets angry and banishes Vikraman from the kingdom. Vikraman, however, still manages to find Madhanamala and they both fall in love. Disguised as a sadhu, Vikraman meets Madhanamala and they spend a night together. Soon, though, Vikraman gets caught. In the end, after some tribulations, Vikraman is reunited with Madhanamala.

== Cast ==
- Sriram as Vikraman
- T. R. Rajanias Madhanamala
- P. B. Rangachari as the fake sadhu
- Vidwan Srinivasan as the poet
- P. S. Veerappan
- M. V. Mani as the king

== Soundtrack ==
M. S. Gnanamani composed the songs, for which the lyrics were written by C. S. Varadarajan.
