= Athikkottai =

- village
- Location in Tamil Nadu, India Athikkottai (India)
- Coordinates: 10°26′0″N 79°20′0″E
- Country: India
- State: Tamil Nadu
- District: Thanjavur

Population
  - Total: 1,740

Languages
  - Official: Tamil
- Time zone: UTC+5:30 (IST)
- PIN: 614906
- Telephone code: 04373
- Vehicle registration: TN-49
- Coastline: 14 kilometres (8.7 mi)
- Nearest city: Thanjavur
- Literacy: 90%
- Lok Sabha constituency: Thanjavur
- Climate: 15 - 38 (Köppen)
- Avg. summer temperature: 38 °C (100 °F)
- Avg. winter temperature: 20 °C (68 °F)

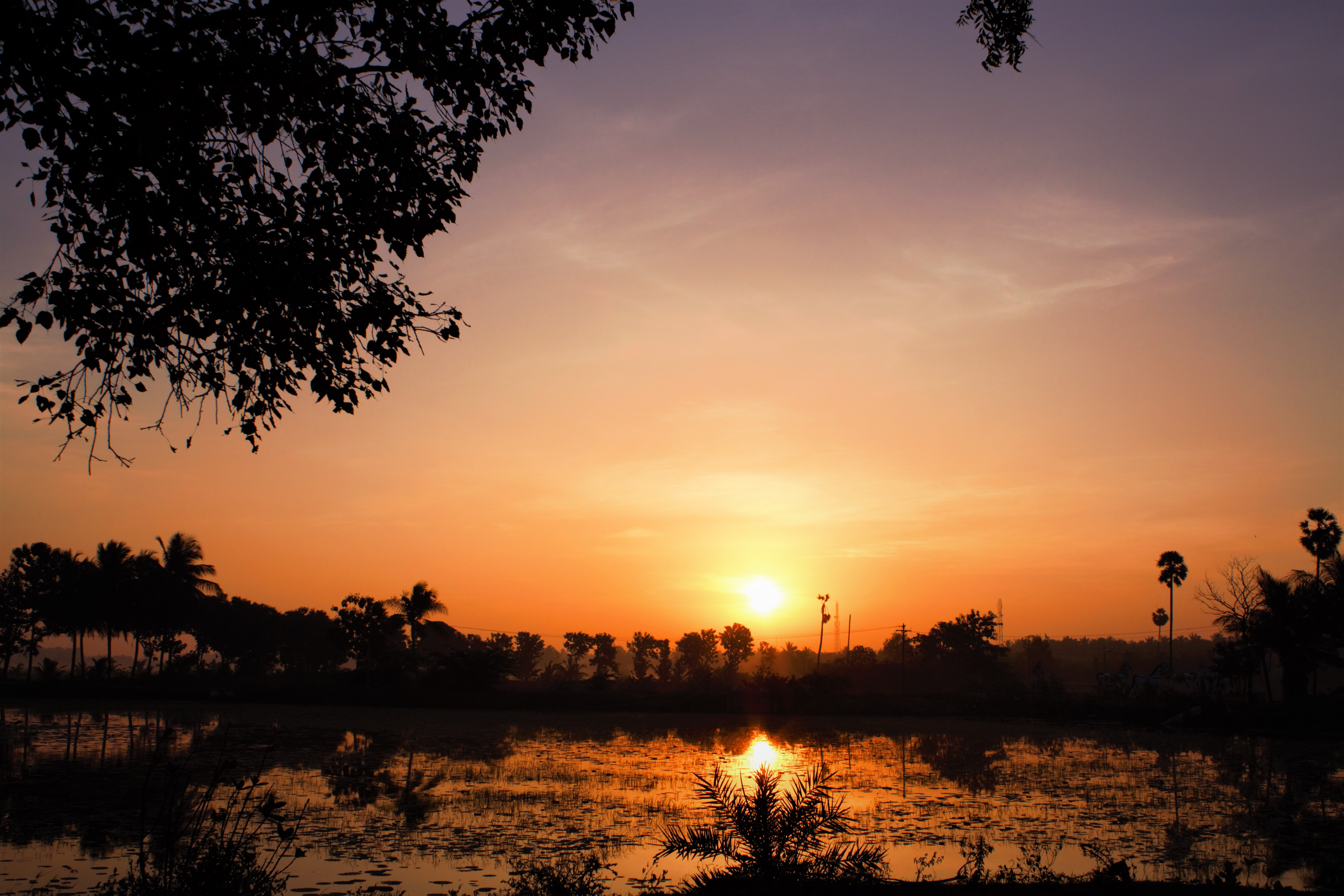
Aiyyanar kulam. A scenic sunrise photographed from the west edge of the Aiyyanar kulam(pond).

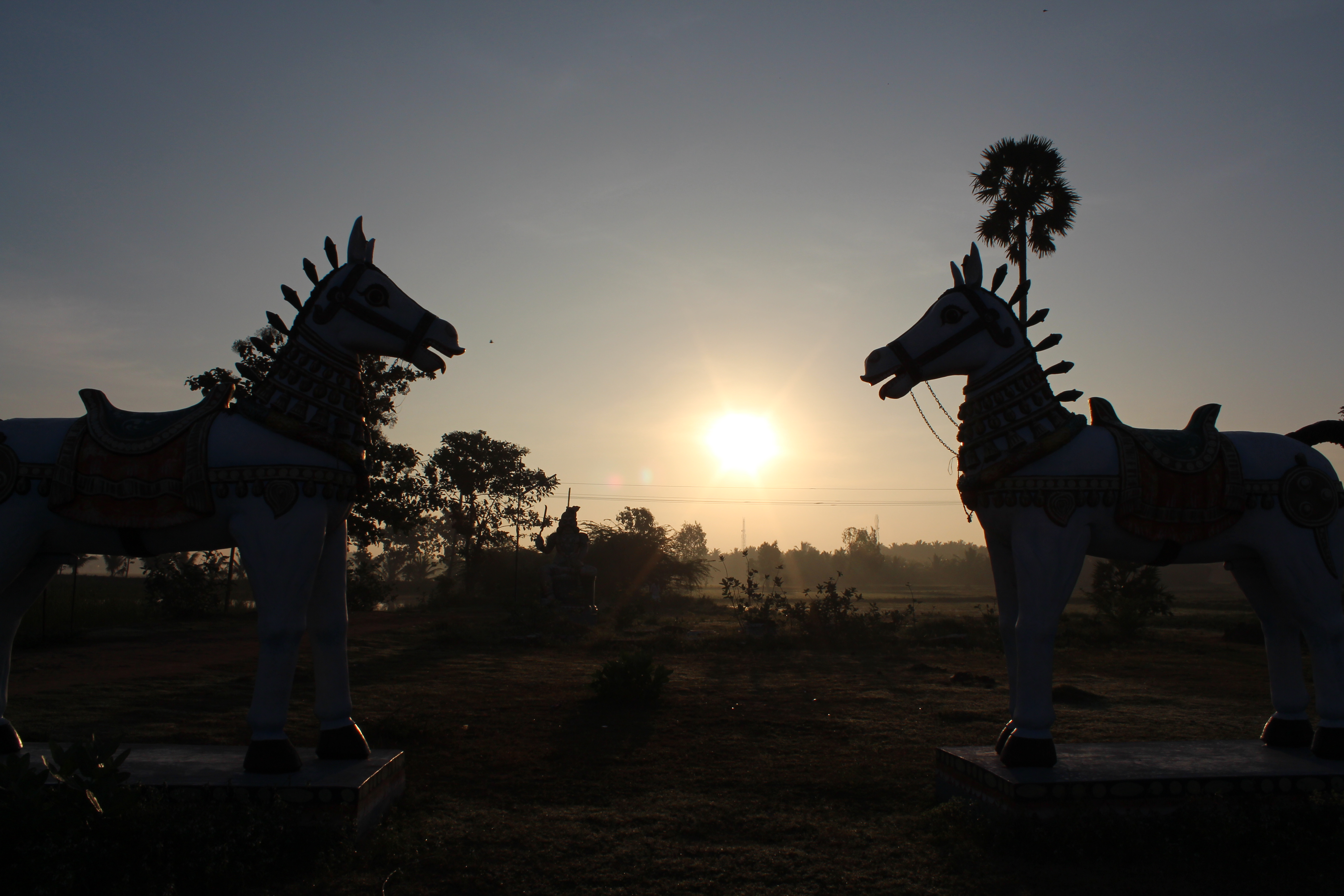
Terracotta horse sculptures on the banks of Aiyyanar pond.

Athikkottai is a village located 3 km from Pattukkottai town in Thanjavur district in Tamil Nadu state in India, en route to pattukottai via Madukkur.It is one of 36 villages of the Musugundan Community.

Most of the people are well educated and very rich. There are many streets and each street has its own family god. Some people from middle street are settled in various cities.

Most of the people are settled in SIngapore, London, and in some other countries. The main occupation of the people of athikkottai is Agriculture. In this village, Paddy cultivation, Sugarcane, and Coconut trees are the major crops.
