= Pudhumai Penn (1959 film) =

- Poster
- Directed by: M. Thiruvengadam
- Screenplay by: P. A. Kumar
- Story by: Dhakshna Moorthy
- Produced by: N. S. Rajagopal; V. G. N. Brothers
- Starring: S. S. Rajendran; Rajasulochana
- Cinematography: Daisi Mani
- Music by: T. G. Lingappa
- Production company: Sree Kajalakshmi Pictures
- Release date: 26 June 1959
- Country: India
- Language: Tamil

Pudhumai Penn (transl. Modern woman) is a 1959 Indian Tamil-language film starring S. S. Rajendran and Rajasulochana. It was released on 26 June 1959.

== Cast ==
- S. S. Rajendran
- Rajasulochana
- T. S. Balaiah
- M. N. Rajam
- R. S. Manohar
- V. K. Ramasamy

== Soundtrack ==
Music was composed by T. G. Lingappa.

Song	Singer	Lyrics	Length
"Ennamelaam.... Ellorume Kaana Kalyaaname"	A. M. Rajah & Jikki	Pattukkottai Kalyanasundaram	03:15
"Minnuvadhellaam Ponnaagi Pomo"	P. B. Sreenivas	A. Maruthakasi	03:33
"Maaraadha Kaadhalaale"	T. M. Soundararajan & P. Susheela		03:29
"Inbam Tharum Naalidhe"	Jikki	A. Maruthakasi	04:56
"Needhiyin Vetriyadaa Cheriyin Sakthi"	T. M. Soundararajan & A. L. Raghavan	Pattukkottai Kalyanasundaram	04:00
"Paataali Makkalin Sevai"	Jikki	Pattukkottai Kalyanasundaram	03:04
"Aambala Koottam Aadura Aattam"	K. Jamuna Rani & K. Rani	Pattukkottai Kalyanasundaram	03:18
"Nenaichadhai Mudichiiduvaa"	P. Susheela	Ku. Ma. Balasubramaniam	02:43
"Sendhamizh Naattu Kaitthari Nesavu"	S. S. Rajendran	Udumalai Narayana Kavi	04:44 music by K. V. Mahadevan
