= V. R. Jayaraman =

Indian politician

V. R. Jayaraman is an Indian politician and former Member of the Legislative Assembly of Tamil Nadu. He was elected to the Tamil Nadu legislative assembly as an Anna Dravida Munnetra Kazhagam candidate from Theni constituency in 1977, 1980 and 1984 elections.

In 2024, he joined the Bharatiya Janata Party in the presence of Tamil Nadu BJP chief K. Annamalai and Rajeev Chandrasekhar.
