= N. R. Thiagarajan =

N.R.Thiagarajan Naidu (1913-1969) was a freedom fighter, congress leader and social activist, born in Lakshimupram village in Madurai district, Madras Presidency of British India.

== Early years ==
He was the uncontested leader of the congress party in Madurai district for more than 25 years from 1944. He joined in the Indian freedom movement during his school days and organised agitation against the British government. He was arrested and imprisoned for more than 5 years in various jails. He was responsible for strengthening the Indian National Congress in Madurai district. He strengthened village congress committees in remote villages around madurai Theni and Periyakulam area and mobilized people for the national movement.

== Political life ==
After 1947 he focused on the development of Madurai district and Theni town. He was a member of the 1957 Madras State Legislative Assembly. He was elected to the Tamil Nadu legislative assembly as an Indian National Congress candidate from Theni (State Assembly Constituency) in 1957 election. He was elected to the Madras legislative council in 1964 from the local government constituency. He was elected as the president of Madurai District Board in 1949.

From 1948 to 1953 he was the president of the District board of the undivided Madurai district which then included three current districts, namely Madurai, Theni and Dindugal. As the president of the Madurai district board he contributed to the district's growth by focussing on the development of primary education, and opened hundreds of schools under the district board. During his tenure Kodaikanal was developed as a well-known hill station in India. He was a close associate of K. Kamaraj, and was a strong supporter for him in South Tamil Nadu.

Thiagarajan Naidu was instrumental in the development of Theni town as an industrial hub. He persuaded Kamaraj Nadar to construct Vaigai Dam near Theni. He worked hard for the establishment of Madurai University and also served as a member of the first senate of Madurai University. He was the opposition party leader in the Tamil Nadu Legislative Council and leader of the Congress party in the Tamil Nadu Legislative Council. He was known for his active participation in the legislature. For many years he was the president of Madurai District congress committee, and developed the party from the grassroots. He gave a well planned action model for the village congress committee. Kamaraj appreciated his organizational abilities and often called Thiagarajan Naidu his right hand in Tamil Nadu Congress. On Thiagarajan's invitation, prime minister Nehru visited Theni town in 1962 and inaugurated many new development projects there.

N.R. Thiagarajan Naidu was a model for other members in the House, and he fully used the legislature to bring new projects for his constituency. The Tamil Nadu government honored him by naming the Theni District hospital as 'N.R.Thiyagarajan Naidu Memorial District Hospital'. He developed a modern housing project under Theni cooperative housing society, which was inaugurated by Sri.Rajagopalchri former governor general of India. It is named as NRT Nagar and is still one of the best housing projects in Tamil Nadu.

Thiagarajan Naidu had two daughters and two sons. He died on 27 April 1969 in Madurai. A memorial to him is maintained in NRT Nagr Theni. His son Dr.N.R.T.Rajkumar is a medical practitioner and served as the governor of Rotary district, and was also an active member of Indian National Congress. His son N.R.T.Rajkumar and Thiagarajan's grandson, Dr.T.R.Thiygarajan Naidu, run NRT Multi-specialty Hospital in Theni which provides affordable medical care to the community. His granddaughter Dr.R.Gomthi Ambika is serving the rural community as a medical practitioner.
