= List of songs by P. Leela =

The following is an incomplete list of the songs known to have been recorded and/or performed by Indian playback singer and Carnatic vocalist P. Leela.

== Malayalam Discography ==
=== 1940s ===
Year	Movie/Album	Song	Co-singers	Music Director	Lyricist
1948	Nirmala	Keralame Loka		E. I. Warrier	G. Sankara Kurup
1948	Nirmala	Paaduka Poonkuyile	T. K. Govindarao	E. I. Warrier	G. Sankara Kurup
1948	Nirmala	Daivame Paalaya		E. I. Warrier	G. Sankara Kurup
1948	Nirmala	Vaazhka Sucharithe		E. I. Warrier	G. Sankara Kurup

=== 1950s ===
Year	Movie/Album	Song	Co-singers	Music Director	Lyricist
1950	Chandrika	Jeevithaanandam Tharum		G. Govindarajulu Naidu & V. Dakshinamoorthy	Thumbaman Padmanabhan Kutty
1950	Chandrika	Mullavalli mele		G. Govindarajulu Naidu & V. Dakshinamoorthy	Thumbaman Padmanabhan Kutty
1950	Chandrika	Nonthuyir Vaadidum Jeevithame		G. Govindarajulu Naidu & V. Dakshinamoorthy	Thumbaman Padmanabhan Kutty
1950	Nalla Thanka	Ammathan Prema Soubhaagya		V. Dakshinamoorthy	Abhayadev
1950	Nalla Thanka	Aanandamaanaake	Augustine Joseph, C. S. Radhadevi & Janamma David	V. Dakshinamoorthy	Abhayadev
1950	Nalla Thanka	Rathnam Vithachaal	Janamma David	V. Dakshinamoorthy	Abhayadev
1950	Nalla Thanka	Imbamerum Ithalaakum	Vaikom M. P. Mani	V. Dakshinamoorthy	Abhayadev
1950	Nalla Thanka	Shambho Njan		V. Dakshinamoorthy	Abhayadev
1950	Nalla Thanka	Shambho Shambho Shivane		V. Dakshinamoorthy	Abhayadev
1950	Sthree	Omanathinkal Kidaavo		B. A. Chidambaranath	Irayimman Thampi
1951	Jeevitha Nouka	Aanandamiyalum Baale		V. Dakshinamoorthy	Abhayadev
1951	Jeevitha Nouka	Ghoraandhakaaramaaya	Thiruchi Loganathan	V. Dakshinamoorthy	Abhayadev
1951	Jeevitha Nouka	Premarajyamarnu	V. Dakshinamoorthy	V. Dakshinamoorthy	Abhayadev
1951	Jeevitha Nouka	Vana Gaayike Vanil Varoo Naayike	Mehboob	V. Dakshinamoorthy	Abhayadev
1951	Kerala Kesari	Parithraanaaya	T. A. Mothi	M. S. Gnanamani	Thumbaman Padmanabhan Kutty
1951	Navalokam	Gaayaka Gaayaka		V. Dakshinamoorthy	P. Bhaskaran
1951	Navalokam	Maanjidaathe Madhura	Kozhikode Abdul Kader	V. Dakshinamoorthy	P. Bhaskaran
1951	Navalokam	Maayunnu Vanasooname		V. Dakshinamoorthy	P. Bhaskaran
1951	Rakthabandham	Shambho Goureesha	Vaikkom M. P. Mani, Kuttappan Bhagavathar	S. M. Subbaiah Naidu & S. N. Ranganathan	Abhayadev
1952	Aathmasakhi	Aa Neelavaanilen	T. A. Mothi	Br Lakshmanan	Thirunainar Kurichi Madhavan Nair
1952	Aathmasakhi	Kaattilaadi	T. A. Mothi	Br Lakshmanan	Thirunainar Kurichi Madhavan Nair
1952	Aathmasakhi	Kannikkathiraadum		Br Lakshmanan	Thirunainar Kurichi Madhavan Nair
1952	Aathmasakhi	Marayukayo Neeyen		Br Lakshmanan	Thirunainar Kurichi Madhavan Nair
1952	Aathmasanthi	Maayamaanu Paaril		T. R. Pappa	Abhayadev
1952	Aathmasanthi	Madhumayamaay	A. P. Komala & T. A. Mothi	T. R. Pappa	Abhayadev
1952	Aathmasanthi	Panineerppoo Pole	T. A. Mothi	T. R. Pappa	Abhayadev
1952	Achan	Madhuramadhuramee		P. S. Divakar	Abhayadev
1952	Achan	Naame Muthalali		P. S. Divakar	Abhayadev
1952	Achan	Varumo Varumo		P. S. Divakar	Abhayadev
1952	Alphonsa	Maanasaveena	T. A. Mothi	T. R. Pappa	Abhayadev
1952	Amma	Aananda Sudinam	V. Dakshinamoorthy	V. Dakshinamoorthy	P. Bhaskaran
1952	Amma	Aniyaay Puzhayil	V. Dakshinamoorthy	V. Dakshinamoorthy	P. Bhaskaran
1952	Amma	Aruma Sodara	V. Dakshinamoorthy	V. Dakshinamoorthy	P. Bhaskaran
1952	Amma	Kezhuka Thaaye		V. Dakshinamoorthy	P. Bhaskaran
1952	Amma	Pon Thiruvonam		V. Dakshinamoorthy	P. Bhaskaran
1952	Amma	Vanamaali Varavaayi Sakhiye		V. Dakshinamoorthy	P. Bhaskaran
1952	Visappinte Vili	Mohiniye Ennaathma	A. M. Rajah	P. S. Divakar	Abhayadev
1952	Visappinte Vili	Ramanan [Sangeetha Naatakam]	A. M. Rajah, Jose Prakash & Kaviyoor Revamma	P. S. Divakar	Abhayadev
1952	Visappinte Vili	Sakhiyaarodum	T. A. Mothi	P. S. Divakar	Abhayadev
1953	Ashadeepam	Jagadanandhakaraka	M. L. Vasanthakumari	V. Dakshinamoorthy	Tyagaraja
1953	Ashadeepam	Janani Jayikka Neenal	M. L. Vasanthakumari	V. Dakshinamoorthy	P. Bhaskaran
1953	Ashadeepam	Jeevithameevidhame	V. Nagayya	V. Dakshinamoorthy	P. Bhaskaran
1953	Ashadeepam	Kanmani Vaa Vaa		V. Dakshinamoorthy	P. Bhaskaran
1953	Ashadeepam	Panthalittu	A. M. Rajah	V. Dakshinamoorthy	P. Bhaskaran
1953	Ashadeepam	Poo Veno		V. Dakshinamoorthy	P. Bhaskaran
1953	Genova	Kanninu Punyamekum Divya Premasaarame	A. M. Rajah	M. S. Gnanamani, T. A. Kalyanam & M. S. Viswanathan	Gayaka Peethambaram
1953	Genova	Kuthukamee Lathakalil	K. Jamuna Rani	M. S. Gnanamani, T. A. Kalyanam & M. S. Viswanathan	Abhayadev
1953	Genova	Leelaalolithame	A. M. Rajah	M. S. Gnanamani, T. A. Kalyanam & M. S. Viswanathan	Abhayadev
1953	Genova	Malarvaadi		M. S. Gnanamani, T. A. Kalyanam & M. S. Viswanathan	Swami Brahmavruthan
1953	Genova	Omanayen		M. S. Gnanamani, T. A. Kalyanam & M. S. Viswanathan	Abhayadev
1953	Genova	Gathi Neeye		M. S. Gnanamani, T. A. Kalyanam & M. S. Viswanathan	Gayaka Peethambaram
1953	Lokaneethi	Anuraagaamritham	Gokulapalan	V. Dakshinamoorthy	Abhayadev
1953	Lokaneethi	Kanna Neeyurangu		V. Dakshinamoorthy	Abhayadev
1953	Lokaneethi	Komala Mridu	Kaviyoor Revamma	V. Dakshinamoorthy	Abhayadev
1953	Lokaneethi	Oru Navayugame	A. M. Rajah & Kaviyoor Revamma	V. Dakshinamoorthy	Abhayadev
1953	Sheriyo Thetto	Jayamangala	V. Dakshinamoorthy	V. Dakshinamoorthy	Thikkurissy Sukumaran Nair
1953	Sheriyo Thetto	Vaarmazhaville Vaa	Jose Prakash	V. Dakshinamoorthy	Thikkurissy Sukumaran Nair
1953	Velakkaran	Aanandamennum	Augustine Joseph	V. Dakshinamoorthy	Abhayadev
1953	Velakkaran	Alayukayaam	Kaviyoor Revamma	V. Dakshinamoorthy	Abhayadev
1953	Velakkaran	Maaye Mahaa Maaye		V. Dakshinamoorthy	Abhayadev
1953	Velakkaran	Mangalacharithe		V. Dakshinamoorthy	Abhayadev
1954	Avan Varunnu	Maanasa Mohane		V. Dakshinamoorthy	Abhayadev
1954	Avan Varunnu	Ororo Chenchorathan	Jose Prakash	V. Dakshinamoorthy	Abhayadev
1954	Avan Varunnu	Varunnu Njan	A. M. Rajah	V. Dakshinamoorthy	Abhayadev
1954	Baalyasakhi	Raavippol		Br Lakshmanan	Thirunainar Kurichi Madhavan Nair
1954	Snehaseema	Adhwaanikkunnavarkkum	Amrutheswari	V. Dakshinamoorthy	Abhayadev
1954	Snehaseema	Anayaathe Nilppu		V. Dakshinamoorthy	Abhayadev
1954	Snehaseema	Innu Varum En Naayakan		V. Dakshinamoorthy	Abhayadev
1954	Snehaseema	Jagadeeshwara Leelakal	A. M. Rajah	V. Dakshinamoorthy	Abhayadev
1954	Snehaseema	Kanivolum Kamaneeyahridayam		V. Dakshinamoorthy	Abhayadev
1954	Snehaseema	Kannum Poottiyuranguka	A. M. Rajah	V. Dakshinamoorthy	Abhayadev
1954	Snehaseema	Kannum Poottiyuranguka		V. Dakshinamoorthy	Abhayadev
1954	Snehaseema	Maanam Thelinju Mazhakkaru Maanju		V. Dakshinamoorthy	Abhayadev
1954	Snehaseema	Poyvaroo Nee Poyvaroo		V. Dakshinamoorthy	Abhayadev
1955	Aniyathi	Aananda Nandakumaraa	Kamukara Purushothaman	Br Lakshmanan	Thirunainar Kurichi Madhavan Nair
1955	Aniyathi	Ammayum Achanum Poyeppinne		Br Lakshmanan	Thirunainar Kurichi Madhavan Nair
1955	Aniyathi	Paahisakala Janani	Soolamangalam Rajalakshmi	Br Lakshmanan	Thirunainar Kurichi Madhavan Nair
1955	Aniyathi	Poomarakkombathu		Br Lakshmanan	Thirunainar Kurichi Madhavan Nair
1955	C.I.D.	Kaalamellaamullaasam	N. L. Ganasaraswathi & V. N. Sundaram	Br Lakshmanan	Thirunainar Kurichi Madhavan Nair
1955	C.I.D.	Kaananam Veendum		Br Lakshmanan	Thirunainar Kurichi Madhavan Nair
1955	C.I.D.	Kaanum Kanninu		Br Lakshmanan	Thirunainar Kurichi Madhavan Nair
1955	C.I.D.	Kaliyalleyee Kallyaanabhaavana	Kamukara Purushothaman	Br Lakshmanan	Thirunainar Kurichi Madhavan Nair
1955	Harishchandra	Aarundu Chollan	Kamukara Purushothaman	Br Lakshmanan	Thirunainar Kurichi Madhavan Nair
1955	Harishchandra	Karuna Saagara	Kamukara Purushothaman	Br Lakshmanan	Thirunainar Kurichi Madhavan Nair
1955	Harishchandra	Kazhal Nonthu Kanmani Nee		Br Lakshmanan	Thirunainar Kurichi Madhavan Nair
1955	Harishchandra	Vaavaa Makane		Br Lakshmanan	Thirunainar Kurichi Madhavan Nair
1955	Natyathaara	Alayum Maname		G. Ashwathama	Abhayadev
1955	Natyathaara	Ayyo Maryaadaraama		G. Ashwathama	Abhayadev
1955	Natyathaara	Enthinee Chandam		G. Ashwathama	Abhayadev
1955	Natyathaara	Ethu Dooshitha		G. Ashwathama	Abhayadev
1955	Natyathaara	Hai Malaramamo		G. Ashwathama	Abhayadev
1955	Natyathaara	Lalalala Jayajaya Devi		G. Ashwathama	Abhayadev
1956	Aathmaarpanam	Aanandavalli	A. M. Rajah	V. Dakshinamoorthy	Abhayadev
1956	Aathmaarpanam	Maniyarayellaam		V. Dakshinamoorthy	Abhayadev
1956	Aathmaarpanam	Puthuvarsham	A. M. Rajah	V. Dakshinamoorthy	Abhayadev
1956	Aathmaarpanam	Vaadathe Nilkkane		V. Dakshinamoorthy	Abhayadev
1956	Manthravadi	Jeeveshwaraa Nee Pirinjal		Br Lakshmanan	Thirunainar Kurichi Madhavan Nair
1956	Manthravadi	Kandathundo Sakhee		Br Lakshmanan	Thirunainar Kurichi Madhavan Nair
1956	Manthravadi	Kanninodu Kannum Chernnu	Kamukara Purushothaman	Br Lakshmanan	Thirunainar Kurichi Madhavan Nair
1956	Manthravadi	Kooduvitta Painkilikku		Br Lakshmanan	Thirunainar Kurichi Madhavan Nair
1956	Manthravadi	Mahaaranyavaase	Kamukara Purushothaman	Br Lakshmanan	Thirunainar Kurichi Madhavan Nair
1956	Manthravadi	Thaaye [Bit]		Br Lakshmanan	Thirunainar Kurichi Madhavan Nair
1956	Rarichan Enna Pauran	Choottuveeshi Paathiraavil		K. Raghavan	P. Bhaskaran
1956	Rarichan Enna Pauran	Kalle Kaniville		K. Raghavan	P. Bhaskaran
1956	Rarichan Enna Pauran	Thekkunnu Nammaloru		K. Raghavan	P. Bhaskaran
1957	Deva Sundari	Jayajaya Suranayaka		T. R. Pappa	Thikkurissy Sukumaran Nair
1957	Jailppulli	Aarodum Oru Paapam		Br Lakshmanan	Thirunainar Kurichi Madhavan Nair
1957	Jailppulli	Namasthe Kairali		Br Lakshmanan	Thirunainar Kurichi Madhavan Nair
1957	Jailppulli	Njanariyaathen	Kamukara Purushothaman	Br Lakshmanan	Thirunainar Kurichi Madhavan Nair
1957	Jailppulli	Onnaanu Naam	Kamukara Purushothaman	Br Lakshmanan	Thirunainar Kurichi Madhavan Nair
1957	Jailppulli	Vellinilaavathu	Kamukara Purushothaman	Br Lakshmanan	Thirunainar Kurichi Madhavan Nair
1957	Minnunnathellam Ponnalla	Kannum En Kannumaay	P. B. Sreenivas	S. N. Ranganathan	P. N. Dev
1957	Minnunnathellam Ponnalla	Minnunnathellaam		S. N. Ranganathan	P. N. Dev
1957	Minnunnathellam Ponnalla	Pachavarnnappainkiliye		S. N. Ranganathan	P. N. Dev
1957	Thaskaraveeran	Chapalam Chapalam	Santha P. Nair	C. Ramchandra & S. M. Subbaiah Naidu	Abhayadev
1957	Thaskaraveeran	Kallanoruthan Vannallo	Santha P. Nair	C. Ramchandra & S. M. Subbaiah Naidu	Abhayadev
1958	Lilly	Odiyodiyodi Vannu	Pattom Sadan	Viswanathan–Ramamoorthy	P. Bhaskaran
1958	Lilly	Yesunaayaka	Santha P. Nair	Viswanathan–Ramamoorthy	P. Bhaskaran
1958	Mariakutty	Manam Nonthu Njaan Petta		Br Lakshmanan	Thirunainar Kurichi Madhavan Nair
1958	Mariakutty	Varumo Irul Maari		Br Lakshmanan	Thirunainar Kurichi Madhavan Nair
1958	Nairu Pidicha Pulivalu	Iniyennu Kaanumen		K. Raghavan	P. Bhaskaran
1958	Nairu Pidicha Pulivalu	Kannuneerithu		K. Raghavan	P. Bhaskaran
1958	Nairu Pidicha Pulivalu	Ponnaninjittila Njaan		K. Raghavan	P. Bhaskaran
1958	Nairu Pidicha Pulivalu	Velutha Penne	K. P. Udayabhanu	K. Raghavan	P. Bhaskaran
1959	Aana Valarthiya Vanampadi	Kaananame		Br Lakshmanan	Thirunainar Kurichi Madhavan Nair
1959	Aana Valarthiya Vanampadi	Paimpaalozhukum	A. M. Rajah	Br Lakshmanan	Thirunainar Kurichi Madhavan Nair
1959	Naadodikal	Inakkuruvi		V. Dakshinamoorthy	P. Bhaskaran
1959	Naadodikal	Innum Kaanum	P. B. Sreenivas	V. Dakshinamoorthy	P. Bhaskaran
1959	Naadodikal	Kannaadiyaattil		V. Dakshinamoorthy	P. Bhaskaran
1959	Naadodikal	Moovandan Maavile		V. Dakshinamoorthy	P. Bhaskaran
1959	Naadodikal	Onnaanaam Kunnil		V. Dakshinamoorthy	P. Bhaskaran

=== 1960s ===
Year	Movie/Album	Song	Co-singers	Music Director	Lyricist
1960	Poothali	Kadalamme Kaniyuka	Kamukara Purushothaman	Br Lakshmanan	Thirunainar Kurichi Madhavan Nair
1960	Poothali	Kaliyaadum Poomala	Kamukara Purushothaman	Br Lakshmanan	Thirunainar Kurichi Madhavan Nair
1960	Poothali	Karunathan Manideepame		Br Lakshmanan	Thirunainar Kurichi Madhavan Nair
1960	Poothali	Oru Pizhayum Karutheedaatha	Kamukara Purushothaman	Br Lakshmanan	Thirunainar Kurichi Madhavan Nair
1960	Umma	En Kanninte Kadaviladuthaal	A. M. Rajah	M. S. Baburaj	P. Bhaskaran
1960	Umma	Kadha Parayaamen Kadha		M. S. Baburaj	P. Bhaskaran
1960	Umma	Konchunna Painkili		M. S. Baburaj	P. Bhaskaran
1960	Umma	Kuyile Kuyile	M. S. Baburaj & A. M. Rajah	M. S. Baburaj	P. Bhaskaran
1960	Umma	Pettammayaakum		M. S. Baburaj	P. Bhaskaran
1960	Umma	Poru Nee Ponmayile	A. M. Rajah	M. S. Baburaj	P. Bhaskaran
1961	Arappavan	Jaathi MathaJaathi	P. B. Sreenivas & KPAC Sulochana	G. K. Venkatesh & P. S. Divakar	Kedamangalam Sadanandan
1961	Arappavan	Karayaathe Karayaathe		G. K. Venkatesh & P. S. Divakar	Kedamangalam Sadanandan
1961	Arappavan	Mathupidikkum	P. B. Sreenivas	G. K. Venkatesh & P. S. Divakar	Kedamangalam Sadanandan
1961	Bhakta Kuchela	Are Duraachaara [Bit]		Br Lakshmanan	
1961	Bhakta Kuchela	Minnum Ponnin	Kamukara Purushothaman	Br Lakshmanan	
1961	Bhakta Kuchela	Kanivu Nirayum	A. P. Komala	Br Lakshmanan	Thirunainar Kurichi Madhavan Nair
1961	Bhakta Kuchela	Maayaamaadhava	Kamukara Purushothaman	Br Lakshmanan	Thirunainar Kurichi Madhavan Nair
1961	Bhakta Kuchela	Madhu Pakarenam	Soolamangalam Rajalakshmi	Br Lakshmanan	Thirunainar Kurichi Madhavan Nair
1961	Bhakta Kuchela	Paaril Aarum Kandaal Viraykkume	Soolamangalam Rajalakshmi	Br Lakshmanan	Thirunainar Kurichi Madhavan Nair
1961	Bhakta Kuchela	Paimpaal Tharum	Kamukara Purushothaman	Br Lakshmanan	Thirunainar Kurichi Madhavan Nair
1961	Bhakta Kuchela	Vikrama Raajendra	Soolamangalam Rajalakshmi	Br Lakshmanan	Thirunainar Kurichi Madhavan Nair
1961	Christmas Rathri	Aattummanammele [Unniyarcha Naadakam]	Kamukara Purushothaman & A. P. Komala	Br Lakshmanan	P. Bhaskaran
1961	Christmas Rathri	Kanmani Karayalle		Br Lakshmanan	P. Bhaskaran
1961	Christmas Rathri	Nanmaniranjoramme		Br Lakshmanan	P. Bhaskaran
1961	Christmas Rathri	Vinnil Ninnum		Br Lakshmanan	P. Bhaskaran
1961	Jnaanasundari	Amma Kanyamani Thante		V. Dakshinamoorthy	Abhayadev
1961	Jnaanasundari	Appanippam Varum		V. Dakshinamoorthy	Abhayadev
1961	Jnaanasundari	Ave Maria		V. Dakshinamoorthy	Abhayadev
1961	Jnaanasundari	Kanyaamariyame Thaaye		V. Dakshinamoorthy	Abhayadev
1961	Jnaanasundari	Maathave Daiva Maathaave		V. Dakshinamoorthy	Abhayadev
1961	Jnaanasundari	Mindaathathenthaanu [Bit]		V. Dakshinamoorthy	Abhayadev
1961	Jnaanasundari	Onnu Chirikkoo	Kamukara Purushothaman	V. Dakshinamoorthy	Abhayadev
1961	Jnaanasundari	Vedanakal Karalin Vedanakal		V. Dakshinamoorthy	Abhayadev
1961	Kandam Becha Kottu	Aananda Saamraajyathil		M. S. Baburaj	P. Bhaskaran
1961	Kandam Becha Kottu	Aatte Potte Irikkatte	M. S. Baburaj	M. S. Baburaj	P. Bhaskaran
1961	Kandam Becha Kottu	Ennittum Vannillallo		M. S. Baburaj	P. Bhaskaran
1961	Kandam Becha Kottu	Maappila Puthumaappila	Kamukara Purushothaman	M. S. Baburaj	P. Bhaskaran
1961	Kandam Becha Kottu	Puthan Manavatti	Gomathy Sisters	M. S. Baburaj	P. Bhaskaran
1961	Kandam Becha Kottu	Thekkunnu vanna kaatte		M. S. Baburaj	P. Bhaskaran
1961	Krishna Kuchela	Aalinte Kombathe	Jikki & Santha P. Nair	K. Raghavan	P. Bhaskaran
1961	Krishna Kuchela	Kaattilekkachyutha	Jikki	K. Raghavan	P. Bhaskaran
1961	Krishna Kuchela	Kaithozhaam	K. Raghavan	K. Raghavan	P. Bhaskaran
1961	Krishna Kuchela	Kando Kando Kannane	Santha P. Nair	K. Raghavan	P. Bhaskaran
1961	Krishna Kuchela	Maamalapolezhum		K. Raghavan	P. Bhaskaran
1961	Krishna Kuchela	Nanda Nandana	A. M. Rajah	K. Raghavan	P. Bhaskaran
1961	Krishna Kuchela	Pullikkaale	Santha P. Nair	K. Raghavan	P. Bhaskaran
1961	Krishna Kuchela	Swagatham Swagatham Bhaktha Kuchela	Jikki & Santha P. Nair	K. Raghavan	P. Bhaskaran
1961	Krishna Kuchela	Thaamarakannanallo	Santha P. Nair	K. Raghavan	P. Bhaskaran
1961	Krishna Kuchela	Varnippathengine	M. L. Vasanthakumari	K. Raghavan	P. Bhaskaran
1961	Krishna Kuchela	Vennilavu Poothu	Jikki & Santha P. Nair	K. Raghavan	P. Bhaskaran
1961	Mudiyanaya Puthran	Chanchala Chanchala	Kaviyoor Revamma	M. S. Baburaj	P. Bhaskaran
1961	Mudiyanaya Puthran	Pottichirikkaruthe		M. S. Baburaj	P. Bhaskaran
1961	Sabarimala Ayyappan	Ingottu Noku	A. L. Raghavan	S. M. Subbaiah Naidu	Abhayadev
1961	Sabarimala Ayyappan	Poovirinju		S. M. Subbaiah Naidu	Abhayadev
1961	Sabarimala Ayyappan	Swargam Kaninju		S. M. Subbaiah Naidu	Abhayadev
1961	Ummini Thanka	Geethopadesham	V. Dakshinamoorthy & M. L. Vasanthakumari	V. Dakshinamoorthy	
1961	Ummini Thanka	Kaavilamme		V. Dakshinamoorthy	P. Gangadharan Nair
1961	Ummini Thanka	Kannuneer Maathram		V. Dakshinamoorthy	
1961	Ummini Thanka	Nimishangalenniyenni		V. Dakshinamoorthy	
1961	Ummini Thanka	Velikkunnil Palli Manchalu		V. Dakshinamoorthy	
1961	Ummini Thanka	Vinnilulla Thaarakame		V. Dakshinamoorthy	
1961	Unniyarcha	Allithamara Kannaale		K. Raghavan	P. Bhaskaran
1961	Unniyarcha	Ezhu Kadalodivanna		K. Raghavan	P. Bhaskaran
1961	Unniyarcha	Neelakkadal Raajaathi Doorathe Raajaathi	P. Susheela & Mehboob	K. Raghavan	P. Bhaskaran
1961	Unniyarcha	Pokuthire Padakkuthire	P. Susheela	K. Raghavan	P. Bhaskaran
1961	Unniyarcha	Porinkal Jayamallo		K. Raghavan	P. Bhaskaran
1961	Unniyarcha	Pullanenikku Ninte	A. M. Rajah	K. Raghavan	P. Bhaskaran
1961	Unniyarcha	Thaamasamenthe (Bit)		K. Raghavan	P. Bhaskaran
1962	Bhagyajathakam	Aadyathe Kanmani	K. J. Yesudas	M. S. Baburaj	P. Bhaskaran
1962	Bhagyajathakam	Nolkkaatha Noyambu		M. S. Baburaj	P. Bhaskaran
1962	Bharya	Panchaarappaalumittaayi	K. J. Yesudas & Renuka	G. Devarajan	Vayalar Ramavarma
1962	Kalpadukal	Enthu Cheyyendethengottu		M. B. Sreenivasan	Kumaran Asan
1962	Kalpadukal	Maalikamuttathe		M. B. Sreenivasan	Nambiyathu
1962	Kalpadukal	Panduthara Hindusthaanathil	K. J. Yesudas & Anandavalli	M. B. Sreenivasan	Kumaran Asan
1962	Kannum Karalum	Kadaleevanathin		M. B. Sreenivasan	Vayalar Ramavarma
1962	Kannum Karalum	Kalimannu Menanju (Happy)		M. B. Sreenivasan	Vayalar Ramavarma
1962	Kannum Karalum	Kalimannu Menanju (Sad)		M. B. Sreenivasan	Vayalar Ramavarma
1962	Kannum Karalum	Thirumizhiyaale		M. B. Sreenivasan	Vayalar Ramavarma
1962	Laila Majnu	Kazhinjuvallo		M. S. Baburaj	P. Bhaskaran
1962	Laila Majnu	Koottililam Kili	A. P. Komala	M. S. Baburaj	P. Bhaskaran
1962	Laila Majnu	Pavanurukki	K. P. Udayabhanu	M. S. Baburaj	P. Bhaskaran
1962	Laila Majnu	Premamadhumaasa Vanathile	K. P. Udayabhanu	M. S. Baburaj	P. Bhaskaran
1962	Laila Majnu	Snehathin Kaananachola		M. S. Baburaj	P. Bhaskaran
1962	Laila Majnu	Thaarame Thaarame	K. P. Udayabhanu	M. S. Baburaj	P. Bhaskaran
1962	Palattu Koman (Konkiyamma)	Ayyappan Kaavilamme		M. S. Baburaj	Vayalar Ramavarma
1962	Palattu Koman (Konkiyamma)	Kanneeru Kondoru		M. S. Baburaj	Vayalar Ramavarma
1962	Palattu Koman (Konkiyamma)	Poove Nalla Poove	Jikki & Santha P. Nair	M. S. Baburaj	Vayalar Ramavarma
1962	Puthiya Akasam Puthiya Bhoomi	Ambarathil [Bit]		M. B. Sreenivasan	P. Bhaskaran
1962	Puthiya Akasam Puthiya Bhoomi	Maadathin Makkale	K. J. Yesudas, K. P. Udayabhanu & K. S. George	M. B. Sreenivasan	P. Bhaskaran
1962	Puthiya Akasam Puthiya Bhoomi	Murali Mohana Krishna	Kaviyoor Revamma	M. B. Sreenivasan	P. Bhaskaran
1962	Puthiya Akasam Puthiya Bhoomi	Thaamarathumpee Vaa Vaa	K. P. Udayabhanu	M. B. Sreenivasan	P. Bhaskaran
1962	Shaanthi Nivas	Aanandakkaattilaadi	A. P. Komala	Ghantasala	Abhayadev
1962	Shaanthi Nivas	Anavadhi Thinma [Bit]		Ghantasala	Abhayadev
1962	Shaanthi Nivas	Raagathin Arangaayi	K. P. Udayabhanu	Ghantasala	Abhayadev
1962	Shaanthi Nivas	Sree Raghuram	P. B. Sreenivas	Ghantasala	Abhayadev
1962	Shaanthi Nivas	Thushaarasheethala		Ghantasala	Abhayadev
1962	Snehadeepam	Aaromalaale		M. B. Sreenivasan	P. Bhaskaran
1962	Snehadeepam	Kaamadahanaa		M. B. Sreenivasan	P. Bhaskaran
1962	Sreekovil	Ellaarkkum Ennekkandaal	K. J. Yesudas	V. Dakshinamoorthy	Abhayadev
1962	Sreekovil	Maanasaveena muzhangi		V. Dakshinamoorthy	Abhayadev
1962	Sreekovil	Neru Parayoo Neru Parayoo		V. Dakshinamoorthy	Abhayadev
1962	Sreekovil	Sreecharanaambujam		V. Dakshinamoorthy	Abhayadev
1962	Sreekovil	Thorukille Mizhi		V. Dakshinamoorthy	Abhayadev
1962	Sreerama Pattabhishekam	Lankesha		Br Lakshmanan	Thirunainar Kurichi Madhavan Nair
1962	Sreerama Pattabhishekam	Sooryavamshathin	Kamukara Purushothaman	Br Lakshmanan	Thirunainar Kurichi Madhavan Nair
1962	Veluthambi Dalawa	Kappalileri Kadal Kadannu		Parthasarathy	Abhayadev
1962	Veluthambi Dalawa	Enthinnu Moham		Parthasarathy	Abhayadev
1962	Veluthambi Dalawa	Kaathukolka Nangale		Parthasarathy	Abhayadev
1962	Veluthambi Dalawa	Poojari Vannille	T. S. Kumaresh	Parthasarathy	Abhayadev
1962	Veluthambi Dalawa	Thankachilanka Kilukki		Parthasarathy	Abhayadev
1962	Vidhi Thanna Vilakku	Chandanakkinnam	P. B. Sreenivas	V. Dakshinamoorthy	P. Bhaskaran
1962	Vidhi Thanna Vilakku	Guruvayoor Puresha		V. Dakshinamoorthy	P. Bhaskaran
1962	Vidhi Thanna Vilakku	Kaaranamenthe Paartha	Vinodini	V. Dakshinamoorthy	P. Bhaskaran
1962	Vidhi Thanna Vilakku	Kaarunya Saagarane [Guruvayupuresa]	A. P. Komala	V. Dakshinamoorthy	P. Bhaskaran
1962	Vidhi Thanna Vilakku	Kannadachaalum	K. J. Yesudas	V. Dakshinamoorthy	P. Bhaskaran
1962	Vidhi Thanna Vilakku	Thuduthudunnaneyulloru		V. Dakshinamoorthy	P. Bhaskaran
1962	Viyarppinte Vila	Kamaneeya keralame	Renuka	V. Dakshinamoorthy	Abhayadev
1962	Viyarppinte Vila	Kochu Kuruvi Vaa Vaa	K. J. Yesudas	V. Dakshinamoorthy	Abhayadev
1962	Viyarppinte Vila	Koottile kiliyaanu njaan		V. Dakshinamoorthy	Abhayadev
1962	Viyarppinte Vila	Omanakkanna		V. Dakshinamoorthy	Abhayadev
1962	Viyarppinte Vila	Thedithediyalanju Njan	P. B. Sreenivas	V. Dakshinamoorthy	Abhayadev
1962	Viyarppinte Vila	Varumo Varumo Gokulapaala		V. Dakshinamoorthy	Abhayadev
1963	Ammaye Kaanaan	Gokkale Mechu		K. Raghavan	P. Bhaskaran
1963	Ammaye Kaanaan	Kadhakadhappainkiliyum		K. Raghavan	P. Bhaskaran
1963	Ammaye Kaanaan	Praanante Praananil		K. Raghavan	P. Bhaskaran
1963	Chilamboli	Deva Ninniluracheedunna		V. Dakshinamoorthy	Abhayadev
1963	Chilamboli	Doorennu Doorennu		V. Dakshinamoorthy	Abhayadev
1963	Chilamboli	Kalaadevathe Saraswathy	Kamukara Purushothaman	V. Dakshinamoorthy	Abhayadev
1963	Chilamboli	Kannane Kanden Sakhi		V. Dakshinamoorthy	Abhayadev
1963	Chilamboli	Maadhava Madhukai		V. Dakshinamoorthy	Abhayadev
1963	Chilamboli	Poovinu Manamilla	Kamukara Purushothaman	V. Dakshinamoorthy	Abhayadev
1963	Chilamboli	Priyamanasa Nee		V. Dakshinamoorthy	Abhayadev
1963	Doctor	Ennaane Ninnaane	K. J. Yesudas	G. Devarajan	P. Bhaskaran
1963	Doctor	Ponnin Chilanka [Pathos I]		G. Devarajan	P. Bhaskaran
1963	Doctor	Ponnin Chilanka [Pathos II]		G. Devarajan	P. Bhaskaran
1963	Doctor	Viralonnu Muttiyaal		G. Devarajan	P. Bhaskaran
1963	Kaattumaina	Kazhuthil Chippiyum	Renuka	Br Lakshmanan	Thirunainar Kurichi Madhavan Nair
1963	Kaattumaina	Nalla Nalla Kayyaanallo		Br Lakshmanan	Thirunainar Kurichi Madhavan Nair
1963	Kaattumaina	Paadaan Chundu		Br Lakshmanan	Thirunainar Kurichi Madhavan Nair
1963	Kadalamma	Kadalamme Kadalamme Kaniyukayille		G. Devarajan	Vayalar Ramavarma
1963	Kadalamma	Oonjaaloonjaalu		G. Devarajan	Vayalar Ramavarma
1963	Kadalamma	Varamaruluka		G. Devarajan	Vayalar Ramavarma
1963	Kalayum Kaminiyum	Kadhayilla Enikku	K. J. Yesudas	M. B. Sreenivasan	P. Bhaskaran
1963	Kalayum Kaminiyum	Kandille Vambu	K. J. Yesudas	M. B. Sreenivasan	P. Bhaskaran
1963	Kalayum Kaminiyum	Unnikkai Randilum		M. B. Sreenivasan	P. Bhaskaran
1963	Moodupadam	Ayalathe Sundari	K. J. Yesudas	M. S. Baburaj	P. Bhaskaran
1963	Moodupadam	Vattan Vilanjittum Varinellu	Santha P. Nair	M. S. Baburaj	P. Bhaskaran
1963	Ninamaninja Kalpadukal	Iniyaare Thirayunnu		M. S. Baburaj	P. Bhaskaran
1963	Ninamaninja Kalpadukal	Ithumaathram Ithumaathram		M. S. Baburaj	P. Bhaskaran
1963	Ninamaninja Kalpadukal	Kanyaathanayaa	Punitha	M. S. Baburaj	P. Bhaskaran
1963	Ninamaninja Kalpadukal	Padinjaare Maanathulla	P. B. Sreenivas	M. S. Baburaj	P. Bhaskaran
1963	Rebecca	Yarushalemin Naayakane		K. Raghavan	Vayalar Ramavarma
1963	Sathyabhama	Gokulathil Pandu		V. Dakshinamoorthy	Abhayadev
1963	Sathyabhama	Kaadinte Karaluthudichu		V. Dakshinamoorthy	Abhayadev
1963	Sathyabhama	Maathe Jaganmaathe		V. Dakshinamoorthy	Abhayadev
1963	Sathyabhama	Mathi Mathi Maayaaleelakal		V. Dakshinamoorthy	Abhayadev
1963	Sathyabhama	Vaadaruthee Malarini	K. P. Udayabhanu	V. Dakshinamoorthy	Abhayadev
1963	Snapaka Yohannan	Aakashathin Mahimaave		Br Lakshmanan	Thirunainar Kurichi Madhavan Nair
1963	Snapaka Yohannan	Bethlaheminte (Thiri Koluthuvin)	K. J. Yesudas	Br Lakshmanan	
1963	Susheela	Kulirkaatte Nee		V. Dakshinamoorthy	Abhayadev
1963	Susheela	Njanoru Kadha Parayaam	Kamukara Purushothaman	V. Dakshinamoorthy	Abhayadev
1964	Aadyakiranangal	Kalyaanamothiram		K. Raghavan	P. Bhaskaran
1964	Aadyakiranangal	Oonjaale Ponnoonjaale		K. Raghavan	P. Bhaskaran
1964	Anna	Manoraajyathinnathirilla	S. Janaki	G. Devarajan	Vayalar Ramavarma
1964	Anna	Naanichu Poyi		G. Devarajan	Vayalar Ramavarma
1964	Atom Bomb	Ennumuthal Ennumuthal		Br Lakshmanan	Thirunainar Kurichi Madhavan Nair
1964	Atom Bomb	Naanikkunnille	A. P. Komala	Br Lakshmanan	Thirunainar Kurichi Madhavan Nair
1964	Atom Bomb	Romeo Romeo	P. B. Sreenivas	Br Lakshmanan	Thirunainar Kurichi Madhavan Nair
1964	Aayisha	Swarnavarnnathattamitta		R. K. Shekhar	Vayalar Ramavarma
1964	Bharthavu	Orikkaloru Poovalankili		V. Dakshinamoorthy	P. Bhaskaran
1964	Devaalayam	Aaraanullil		V. Dakshinamoorthy	Abhayadev
1964	Devaalayam	Maanathu Kaaru Kandu		V. Dakshinamoorthy	Abhayadev
1964	Devaalayam	Neela Viriyitta		V. Dakshinamoorthy	Abhayadev
1964	Devaalayam	Njaninnale	K. J. Yesudas	V. Dakshinamoorthy	Abhayadev
1964	Devaalayam	Odippokum		V. Dakshinamoorthy	Abhayadev
1964	Kalyana Photo	Kaalvari Malakkupokum		K. Raghavan	Vayalar Ramavarma
1964	Kalyana Photo	Konchi Kunungi	K. J. Yesudas	K. Raghavan	Vayalar Ramavarma
1964	Kalyana Photo	Omanathinkal Kidaavurangu		K. Raghavan	Vayalar Ramavarma
1964	Kalyana Photo	Pavizhamuthinu Pono		K. Raghavan	Vayalar Ramavarma
1964	Karutha Kai	Maanatheppenne		M. S. Baburaj	Thirunainar Kurichi Madhavan Nair
1964	Kudumbini	Enthelaam Kadhakal		L. P. R. Varma	Abhayadev
1964	Kudumbini	Karayaathe Karayaathe		L. P. R. Varma	Abhayadev
1964	Kudumbini	Olathil Thulli		L. P. R. Varma	Abhayadev
1964	Kudumbini	Swapnathin Pushparadhathil	K. J. Yesudas	L. P. R. Varma	Abhayadev
1964	Kudumbini	Vedanayellaamenikku		L. P. R. Varma	Abhayadev
1964	Kuttikkuppayam	Innente Karalile		M. S. Baburaj	P. Bhaskaran
1964	Kuttikkuppayam	Kalyaana Rathriyil		M. S. Baburaj	P. Bhaskaran
1964	Kuttikkuppayam	Pottichirikkuvaan	Gomathy & Uthaman	M. S. Baburaj	P. Bhaskaran
1964	Kuttikkuppayam	Virunnu Varum	Uthaman	M. S. Baburaj	P. Bhaskaran
1964	Manavatty	Ashtamudikkaayalile	K. J. Yesudas	G. Devarajan	Vayalar Ramavarma
1964	Omanakuttan	Illathama Kulichu Varumbol	P. Susheela	G. Devarajan	Vayalar Ramavarma
1964	Omanakuttan	Kanikaanum Neram	Renuka	G. Devarajan	
1964	Omanakuttan	Oru Divasam	K. P. Udayabhanu & Renuka	G. Devarajan	Vayalar Ramavarma
1964	Oral Koodi Kallanayi	Chaaykkadakkaaran Beeraankaakkede	K. J. Yesudas	K. V. Job	Sreemoolanagaram Vijayan
1964	Oral Koodi Kallanayi	Enthinum Meethe Muzhangatte		K. V. Job	Abhayadev
1964	Oral Koodi Kallanayi	Kaarunyam Kolunna		K. V. Job	G. Sankara Kurup
1964	Oral Koodi Kallanayi	Karivala Vikkana		K. V. Job	Abhayadev
1964	Oral Koodi Kallanayi	Kinaavilennum Vannene	K. J. Yesudas	K. V. Job	Abhayadev
1964	Oral Koodi Kallanayi	Poovukal Thendum		K. V. Job	G. Sankara Kurup
1964	Pazhassi Raja	Jaathijaathaanukamba		R. K. Shekhar	Vayalar Ramavarma
1964	Pazhassi Raja	Jaya Jaya Bhagavathi Maathangi	K. J. Yesudas	R. K. Shekhar	Vayalar Ramavarma
1964	Pazhassi Raja	Paathiraappoovukal		R. K. Shekhar	Vayalar Ramavarma
1964	Pazhassi Raja	Saayippe Saayippe	Mehboob	R. K. Shekhar	Vayalar Ramavarma
1964	Pazhassi Raja	Thekku Thekku Thekanaam	K. J. Yesudas	R. K. Shekhar	Vayalar Ramavarma
1964	Pazhassi Raja	Villaalikale	K. S. George	R. K. Shekhar	Vayalar Ramavarma
1964	School Master	Anthimayangiyallo	K. J. Yesudas	G. Devarajan	Vayalar Ramavarma
1964	School Master	Zindabaad Zindabaad	A. P. Komala	G. Devarajan	Vayalar Ramavarma
1964	Sree Guruvayoorappan	Janaka Kumaariyethedi		V. Dakshinamoorthy	Abhayadev
1964	Sree Guruvayoorappan	Kannaal Ennini [Avarnaneeyam]		V. Dakshinamoorthy	Abhayadev
1964	Sree Guruvayoorappan	Krishna Krishna Enne		V. Dakshinamoorthy	Abhayadev
1964	Sree Guruvayoorappan	Maayaamaanava		V. Dakshinamoorthy	Abhayadev
1964	Sree Guruvayoorappan	Malayalipenne	Renuka	V. Dakshinamoorthy	Abhayadev
1964	Sree Guruvayoorappan	Umma Tharam		V. Dakshinamoorthy	Abhayadev
1964	Thacholi Othenan	Appam Venam	Santha P. Nair	M. S. Baburaj	P. Bhaskaran
1964	Thacholi Othenan	Ezhimalakkaadukalil		M. S. Baburaj	P. Bhaskaran
1964	Thacholi Othenan	Janichavarkkellaam [Bit]		M. S. Baburaj	P. Bhaskaran
1964	Thacholi Othenan	Kanni Nilaavathu		M. S. Baburaj	P. Bhaskaran
1964	Thacholi Othenan	Kottum Njaan Kettilla		M. S. Baburaj	P. Bhaskaran
1964	Thacholi Othenan	Nallolappainkili		M. S. Baburaj	P. Bhaskaran
1964	Thacholi Othenan	Thacholi Meppele		M. S. Baburaj	P. Bhaskaran
1965	Ammu	Maayakkaara Manivarnna		M. S. Baburaj	Yusufali Kechery
1965	Bhoomiyile Malakha	Mundoppaadatu Koythinu	Zero Babu	M. A. Majeed	Sreemoolanagaram Vijayan
1965	Devatha	Dheerasameere	M. Balamuralikrishna	P. S. Divakar	Jayadevar
1965	Devatha	Kaalam Thaychutharunnu	K. J. Yesudas	P. S. Divakar	P. Bhaskaran
1965	Devatha	Kaappiri Thannude Kannil	K. J. Yesudas	P. S. Divakar	P. Bhaskaran
1965	Devatha	Kannillengilum		P. S. Divakar	P. Bhaskaran
1965	Devatha	Kannukalennal	K. J. Yesudas	P. S. Divakar	P. Bhaskaran
1965	Devatha	Karutha Hridayam Moodaan	K. J. Yesudas	P. S. Divakar	P. Bhaskaran
1965	Devatha	Thaalolam Unni	M. Balamuralikrishna	P. S. Divakar	P. Bhaskaran
1965	Devatha	Yogeendrarkkumalakashyanaay		P. S. Divakar	Traditional
1965	Inapraavugal	Karivala Karivala	P. B. Sreenivas	V. Dakshinamoorthy	Vayalar Ramavarma
1965	Jeevithayaathra	Achhane Aadyamaay (Bit)		P. S. Divakar	Abhayadev
1965	Jeevithayaathra	Thankakkudame Urangoo	K. J. Yesudas	P. S. Divakar	Abhayadev
1965	Kattupookkal	Deepam Kaattuka	Gomathy & L. R. Anjali	G. Devarajan	O. N. V. Kurup
1965	Kattupookkal	Kaattupookkal Njangal		G. Devarajan	O. N. V. Kurup
1965	Kattupookkal	Puzhavakkil Pullanimetil	G. Devarajan & L. R. Anjali	G. Devarajan	O. N. V. Kurup
1965	Kavyamela	Devi Sreedevi (F)		V. Dakshinamoorthy	Vayalar Ramavarma
1965	Kavyamela	Swapnangal Swapnangal	K. J. Yesudas, V. Dakshinamoorthy, P. B. Sreenivas & M. B. Sreenivasan	V. Dakshinamoorthy	Vayalar Ramavarma
1965	Kavyamela	Swapnangal Swapnangale	K. J. Yesudas	V. Dakshinamoorthy	Vayalar Ramavarma
1965	Kavyamela	Theerthayaathra Ithu	K. J. Yesudas	V. Dakshinamoorthy	Vayalar Ramavarma
1965	Kadathukaran	Mutholakkudayumaay		M. S. Baburaj	Vayalar Ramavarma
1965	Kadathukaran	Thrikkaarthikaykku	K. P. Udayabhanu	M. S. Baburaj	Vayalar Ramavarma
1965	Kaliyodam	Kaliyodam [F]		G. Devarajan	O. N. V. Kurup
1965	Kaliyodam	Kaliyodam	K. J. Yesudas & S. Janaki	G. Devarajan	O. N. V. Kurup
1965	Kaliyodam	Pambayaarozhukunna Nade		G. Devarajan	O. N. V. Kurup
1965	Kuppivala	Pottichirikkalle		M. S. Baburaj	P. Bhaskaran
1965	Mayavi	Kannaaram Pothi	Kamukara Purushothaman	M. S. Baburaj	P. Bhaskaran
1965	Mayavi	Pandorikkal		M. S. Baburaj	P. Bhaskaran
1965	Odayil Ninnu	Ambalakkulangare		G. Devarajan	Vayalar Ramavarma
1965	Porter Kunjali	Jannathu Thaamara		M. S. Baburaj	Abhayadev
1965	Porter Kunjali	Odippokum Kaatte	P. B. Sreenivas	M. S. Baburaj	Abhayadev
1965	Rajamalli	Kaatte Vaa		B. A. Chidambaranath	P. Bhaskaran
1965	Rosie	Enkilo Pandoru		K. V. Job	P. Bhaskaran
1965	Sarppakavu	Aashanabhassil	K. J. Yesudas	M. S. Baburaj	Abhayadev
1965	Sarppakavu	Innale Njanoru		M. S. Baburaj	Abhayadev
1965	Sarppakavu	Koodappirappe Nee		M. S. Baburaj	Abhayadev
1965	Sarppakavu	Malamakal	A. P. Komala	M. S. Baburaj	Abhayadev
1965	Sarppakavu	Nanma Cheyyanam	Kamukara Purushothaman & A. P. Komala	M. S. Baburaj	Abhayadev
1965	Shakuntala	Kaamavardhiniyaam [Varnippathengine (Krishnakuchela)]	M. L. Vasanthakumari	K. Raghavan	P. Bhaskaran
1965	Shakuntala	Ennathu Kettu		K. Raghavan	Thunchaththu Ezhuthachan
1965	Shakuntala	Kaithozhaam Kanna	A. P. Komala	K. Raghavan	P. Bhaskaran
1965	Shakuntala	Kandaalaarkum		K. Raghavan	P. Bhaskaran
1965	Thommante Makkal	Nillu Nillu Naanakkudukkakale	S. Janaki, P. B. Sreenivas & K. P. Udayabhanu	M. S. Baburaj	Vayalar Ramavarma
1966	Archana	Dhanumaasa Pushpathe		K. Raghavan	Vayalar Ramavarma
1966	Archana	Kollaamedi Kollaamedi Penne		K. Raghavan	Vayalar Ramavarma
1966	Chemmeen	Pennaale Pennaale	K. J. Yesudas	Salil Chowdhury	Vayalar Ramavarma
1966	Chemmeen	Puthan Valakkare	K. J. Yesudas, K. P. Udayabhanu & Santha P. Nair	Salil Chowdhury	Vayalar Ramavarma
1966	Kaattumallika	Kalyaanamaakaatha	S. Janaki	M. S. Baburaj	Sreekumaran Thampi
1966	Kaattumallika	Kannuneerkkaattile	S. Janaki	M. S. Baburaj	Sreekumaran Thampi
1966	Kaattumallika	Pandathe Paattukal	Kamukara Purushothaman	M. S. Baburaj	Sreekumaran Thampi
1966	Kaattumallika	Thimthimithaaro		M. S. Baburaj	Sreekumaran Thampi
1966	Kadamattathachan	Aarundenikkoru		V. Dakshinamoorthy	Abhayadev
1966	Kadamattathachan	Angangu Doore		V. Dakshinamoorthy	Anujan Kurichi
1966	Kadamattathachan	Ellaam Thakarnallo		V. Dakshinamoorthy	Abhayadev
1966	Kalyanarathriyil	Nadikal		G. Devarajan	Vayalar Ramavarma
1966	Koottukar	Veettilinnale Vadakku		M. S. Baburaj	Vayalar Ramavarma
1966	Kunjikkoonan	Thanthimithaaro		B. A. Chidambaranath	P. Bhaskaran
1966	Pennmakkal	Chethi Mandaaram Thulasi	B. Vasantha & B. Savithri	M. S. Baburaj	Vayalar Ramavarma
1966	Pennmakkal	Kaalan Kesavan	Kamukara Purushothaman & Parameswaran	M. S. Baburaj	Vayalar Ramavarma
1966	Pennmakkal	Oramma Petta	S. Janaki	M. S. Baburaj	Vayalar Ramavarma
1966	Pennmakkal	Pulliman Mizhi	Kamukara Purushothaman	M. S. Baburaj	Vayalar Ramavarma
1966	Pinchuhridhayam	Kattakkidaavaaya [Devakiyasode]		V. Dakshinamoorthy	P. Bhaskaran
1966	Pinchuhridhayam	Mallaakshee ManiMoule	A. P. Komala	V. Dakshinamoorthy	P. Bhaskaran
1966	Priyathama	Anuragathinnalakadal	S. Janaki	Br Lakshmanan	Sreekumaran Thampi
1966	Priyathama	Muthe Nammude Muttathum		Br Lakshmanan	Sreekumaran Thampi
1966	Puthri	Kanpeeli	Kamukara Purushothaman	M. B. Sreenivasan	O. N. V. Kurup
1966	Puthri	Thozhukaithirinaalam		M. B. Sreenivasan	O. N. V. Kurup
1966	Sthanarthi Saramma	Akkarappachayile	K. J. Yesudas	L. P. R. Varma	Vayalar Ramavarma
1966	Sthanarthi Saramma	Yarusalemin Naadha		L. P. R. Varma	Vayalar Ramavarma
1966	Thilothama	Bhaagyaheenakal		G. Devarajan	Vayalar Ramavarma
1966	Thilothama	Indeevaranayane	P. Susheela	G. Devarajan	Vayalar Ramavarma
1967	Arakkillam	Kaatharamizhi		G. Devarajan	Vayalar Ramavarma
1967	Chekuthante Kotta	Swapnam Ennude Kaathil [Sad Version]		B. A. Chidambaranath	P. Bhaskaran
1967	Chekuthante Kotta	Swapnam Vannen		B. A. Chidambaranath	P. Bhaskaran
1967	Cochin Express	Ethu Raavilennnariyilla		V. Dakshinamoorthy	Sreekumaran Thampi
1967	Cochin Express	Kannukal Thudichappol		V. Dakshinamoorthy	Sreekumaran Thampi
1967	Collector Malathy	Ambalapparambil	K. J. Yesudas	M. S. Baburaj	Vayalar Ramavarma
1967	Indulekha	Ambiliye Arikilonnu	Kamukara Purushothaman	V. Dakshinamoorthy	Pappanamcode Lakshmanan
1967	Indulekha	Kannetha Doore		V. Dakshinamoorthy	Pappanamcode Lakshmanan
1967	Indulekha	Maanasam Thirayunnuthaare	Kamukara Purushothaman	V. Dakshinamoorthy	Pappanamcode Lakshmanan
1967	Indulekha	Nale Varunnu Thozhi		V. Dakshinamoorthy	Pappanamcode Lakshmanan
1967	Kaanatha Veshangal	Nale Veettil	B. Vasantha	B. A. Chidambaranath	Vayalar Ramavarma
1967	Kaanatha Veshangal	Paalkadal Naduvil	K. J. Yesudas & J. M. Raju	B. A. Chidambaranath	Vayalar Ramavarma
1967	Kottayam Kolacase	Aaraadhakare		B. A. Chidambaranath	Vayalar Ramavarma
1967	Kottayam Kolacase	Vellaaram Kunninu	K. P. Chandramohan	B. A. Chidambaranath	Vayalar Ramavarma
1967	Kunjali Marakkar	Muttathu Pookkana		B. A. Chidambaranath	P. Bhaskaran
1967	Lady Doctor	Ellaam Ellaam Thakarnallo		V. Dakshinamoorthy	P. Bhaskaran
1967	Madatharuvi	Punchiri Chundil		B. A. Chidambaranath	P. Bhaskaran
1967	N.G.O	Keshapaashadhritha		B. A. Chidambaranath	P. Bhaskaran
1967	Ollathumathi	Maaran Varunnennu	B. Vasantha	L. P. R. Varma	Ramachandran
1967	Pavappettaval	Ambili Maama		B. A. Chidambaranath	P. Bhaskaran
1967	Pavappettaval	Sharanamayyappaa Sharanamayyappaa	B. Vasantha, Latha Raju & B. Savithri	B. A. Chidambaranath	P. Bhaskaran
1967	Pavappettaval	Vrindaavaniyil	K. J. Yesudas	B. A. Chidambaranath	P. Bhaskaran
1967	Pooja	Oru Kochu Swapnathinte		G. Devarajan	P. Bhaskaran
1967	Pooja	Vanachandrikayude		G. Devarajan	P. Bhaskaran
1967	Postman	Gokulapaala		B. A. Chidambaranath	Vayalar Ramavarma
1967	Ramanan	Kaananachaaya	K. P. Udayabhanu	K. Raghavan	Changampuzha Krishna Pillai
1967	Ramanan	Pottukillini		K. Raghavan	Changampuzha Krishna Pillai
1967	Ramanan	Praananaayaka		K. Raghavan	Changampuzha Krishna Pillai
1967	Ramanan	Sampoothamee		K. Raghavan	Changampuzha Krishna Pillai
1967	Sahadharmini	Aalolam	S. Janaki	B. A. Chidambaranath	Vayalar Ramavarma
1967	Sahadharmini	Himagiri		B. A. Chidambaranath	Vayalar Ramavarma
1968	Adhyapika	Kanya Nandana		V. Dakshinamoorthy	O. N. V. Kurup
1968	Adhyapika	| Kalyani Menon, Renuka & Padma		V. Dakshinamoorthy	O. N. V. Kurup
1968	Adhyapika	Manassinullile Mayipeeli (Rajakumari)		V. Dakshinamoorthy	O. N. V. Kurup
1968	Adhyapika	Pallimanikale	Renuka	V. Dakshinamoorthy	O. N. V. Kurup
1968	Asuravithu	Kunkuma Maram Vetti	C. O. Anto	K. Raghavan	
1968	Asuravithu	Kunnathoru Kaavundu	C. O. Anto	K. Raghavan	
1968	Bharyamar Sookshikkuka	Chandrikayilaliyunnu(D)	K. J. Yesudas	V. Dakshinamoorthy	Sreekumaran Thampi
1968	Bharyamar Sookshikkuka	Maapputharoo		V. Dakshinamoorthy	Sreekumaran Thampi
1968	Ezhu Rathrikal	Panchamiyo Pournamiyo		Salil Chowdhury	Vayalar Ramavarma
1968	Love in Kerala	Kudukuduthira Kummi	Kamala	M. S. Baburaj	Sreekumaran Thampi
1968	Love in Kerala	Premikkan Marannu	Mahalakshmi	M. S. Baburaj	Sreekumaran Thampi
1968	Padunna Puzha	Paadunnu Puzha	A. P. Komala	V. Dakshinamoorthy	Sreekumaran Thampi
1968	Padunna Puzha	Paadunnu Puzha		V. Dakshinamoorthy	Sreekumaran Thampi
1968	Padunna Puzha	Paadunnu Puzha	S. Janaki	V. Dakshinamoorthy	Sreekumaran Thampi
1968	Padunna Puzha	Sindhubhairavi Raagarasam	A. P. Komala	V. Dakshinamoorthy	Sreekumaran Thampi
1968	Pengal	Kaarmukilolivarnna		K. V. Job & George	T. P. Sukumaran & Santhakumar
1968	Vazhi Pizhacha Santhathi	Alliyaambal Poovu		B. A. Chidambaranath	P. Bhaskaran
1968	Vazhi Pizhacha Santhathi	Hari Krishna krishna	P. Jayachandran, B. Vasantha, Sreelatha Namboothiri & B. Savithri	B. A. Chidambaranath	P. Bhaskaran
1968	Vazhi Pizhacha Santhathi	Pankajadalanayane	P. Jayachandran, B. Vasantha, Sreelatha Namboothiri & B. Savithri	B. A. Chidambaranath	P. Bhaskaran
1968	Vazhi Pizhacha Santhathi	Thaarunyappoykayil		B. A. Chidambaranath	P. Bhaskaran
1968	Velutha Kathreena	Onnaam Kandathil	P. B. Sreenivas	G. Devarajan	Sreekumaran Thampi
1968	Vidyarthi	Heart Weak	Prema & Kamala	B. A. Chidambaranath	Vayalar Ramavarma
1968	Viplavakarikal	Thamburaattikkoru	P. Susheela	G. Devarajan	Vayalar Ramavarma
1968	Viruthan Shanku	Aaraamamullakale		B. A. Chidambaranath	P. Bhaskaran
1968	Viruthan Shanku	Innuvarum Achan		B. A. Chidambaranath	P. Bhaskaran
1968	Viruthan Shanku	Jananiyum Janakanum	A. P. Komala	B. A. Chidambaranath	P. Bhaskaran
1968	Viruthan Shanku	Pushpangal Choodiya	K. J. Yesudas	B. A. Chidambaranath	P. Bhaskaran
1968	Yakshi	Swarnachaamaram Veeshiyethunna	K. J. Yesudas	G. Devarajan	Vayalar Ramavarma
1968	Yakshi	Swarnachaamaram(F)		G. Devarajan	Vayalar Ramavarma
1969	Aalmaram	Pullani Varambathu	C. O. Anto	A. T. Ummer	P. Bhaskaran
1969	Adimakal	Lalithalavanga		G. Devarajan	Jayadevar
1969	Aaryankavu Kollasangam	Punchiri Thooki		B. A. Chidambaranath	Kedamangalam Sadanandan
1969	Ballatha Pahayan	Swargapputhumaran	L. R. Eswari	K. V. Job	Sreekumaran Thampi
1969	Ballatha Pahayan	Thirty Days in September	Malini	K. V. Job	Sreekumaran Thampi
1969	Chattambikkavala	Oru Hridayathalikayil	P. Jayachandran	B. A. Chidambaranath	O. N. V. Kurup
1969	Danger Biscuit	Maananvamanamoru		V. Dakshinamoorthy	Sreekumaran Thampi
1969	Danger Biscuit	Thamasaa Nadiyude		V. Dakshinamoorthy	Sreekumaran Thampi
1969	Kadalpalam	Ujjayiniyile		G. Devarajan	Vayalar Ramavarma
1969	Kallichellamma	Kaalamenna Kaaranavarkku	C. O. Anto, Kottayam Santha & Sreelatha Namboothiri	K. Raghavan	P. Bhaskaran
1969	Kannur Deluxe	Kannundaayathu Ninne	P. B. Sreenivas	V. Dakshinamoorthy	Sreekumaran Thampi
1969	Kumara Sambhavam	Ksheerasaagara Nandini Pournami		G. Devarajan	Vayalar Ramavarma
1969	Kumara Sambhavam	Maayaanadanavihaarini	Radha Jayalakshmi	G. Devarajan	O. N. V. Kurup
1969	Kumara Sambhavam	Sharavanappoykayil Avathaaram	Kamukara Purushothaman	G. Devarajan	Vayalar Ramavarma
1969	Rahasyam	Mazhavillu Kondo		B. A. Chidambaranath	Sreekumaran Thampi
1969	Rahasyam	Mazhavillukondo Bit		B. A. Chidambaranath	Sreekumaran Thampi
1969	Rest House	Maanakkedaayallo (F)	L. R. Eswari	M. K. Arjunan	Sreekumaran Thampi
1969	Urangatha Sundary	Gorochanam Kondu		G. Devarajan	Vayalar Ramavarma
1969	Virunnukari	Ambaadi Pennungalodu		M. S. Baburaj	P. Bhaskaran
1969	Virunnukari	Pormulakkachayumaay		M. S. Baburaj	P. Bhaskaran

=== 1970s ===
Year	Movie/Album	Song	Co-singers	Music Director	Lyricist
1970	Abhayam	Eriyum Snehaardramaam		V. Dakshinamoorthy	G. Sankara Kurup
1970	Abhayam	Kaama Krodha Lobha	P. Jayachandran, C. Soman, C. O. Anto, T. Soman & Varghese	V. Dakshinamoorthy	Vayalar Ramavarma
1970	Ambalapravu	Pramadavanathil		M. S. Baburaj	P. Bhaskaran
1970	Aranazhika Neram	Samayamaam Radhathil	P. Madhuri	G. Devarajan	Volbrecht Nagel
1970	Aranazhika Neram	Swarangale Sapthaswarangale		G. Devarajan	Vayalar Ramavarma
1970	Ezhuthatha Kadha	Ambalamanikal		V. Dakshinamoorthy	Sreekumaran Thampi
1970	Ezhuthatha Kadha	Venkottakkudakkeezhil		V. Dakshinamoorthy	Sreekumaran Thampi
1970	Kalpana	Prapanchamundaaya		V. Dakshinamoorthy	Vayalar Ramavarma
1970	Kurukshethram	Cherupeelikalilakunnoru		K. Raghavan	P. Bhaskaran
1970	Lottery Ticket	Kavya Narthaki	K. J. Yesudas	V. Dakshinamoorthy	Sreekumaran Thampi
1970	Lottery Ticket	Oro Kanavilum		V. Dakshinamoorthy	Sreekumaran Thampi
1970	Mindapennu	Kandaal Nalloru		G. Devarajan	Yusufali Kechery
1970	Ningalenne Communistakki	Kothumbuvallam Thuzhanjuvarum	K. J. Yesudas, P. Madhuri & B. Vasantha	G. Devarajan	Vayalar Ramavarma
1970	Olavum Theeravum	Kavililulla Maarivillinu		M. S. Baburaj	P. Bhaskaran
1970	Othenente Makan	Raamayanathile Seetha	M. G. Radhakrishnan	G. Devarajan	Vayalar Ramavarma
1970	Palunkupaathram	Oru Koottam Kadamkadha		V. Dakshinamoorthy	Thikkurissy Sukumaran Nair
1970	Priya	Kannonnu Thurakkoo	S. Janaki	M. S. Baburaj	Yusufali Kechery
1970	Rakthapushpam	Orothullichorakkum	C. O. Anto	M. K. Arjunan	Sreekumaran Thampi
1970	Rakthapushpam	Oru Theevediyundaykkum	C. O. Anto	M. K. Arjunan	Sreekumaran Thampi
1970	Sabarimala Sree Dharmashastha	Hemaambaraadambaree		V. Dakshinamoorthy & Jaya Vijaya	Vayalar Ramavarma
1970	Sabarimala Sree Dharmashastha	Lapannachyuthananda	K. J. Yesudas, Ambili, Latha Raju, P. Susheeladevi	V. Dakshinamoorthy & Jaya Vijaya	Sankaracharyar
1970	Sabarimala Sree Dharmashastha	Madhuraapura Nayike		V. Dakshinamoorthy & Jaya Vijaya	Sankaracharyar
1970	Sabarimala Sree Dharmashastha	Paarvanendu	Ambili, Latha Raju, P. Susheeladevi & Leela Warrier	V. Dakshinamoorthy & Jaya Vijaya	P. Bhaskaran
1970	Sabarimala Sree Dharmashastha	Unmaadinikal Udyaanalathakal		V. Dakshinamoorthy & Jaya Vijaya	Vayalar Ramavarma
1970	Saraswathi	Ethra Thanne		M. S. Baburaj	Thikkurissy Sukumaran Nair
1970	Swapnangal	Thirumayilppeeli (Pathos)	Renuka	G. Devarajan	Vayalar Ramavarma
1970	Swapnangal	Thirumayilppeeli	Latha Raju	G. Devarajan	Vayalar Ramavarma
1970	Vaazhve Mayam	Bhagavaanoru Kuravanaayi		G. Devarajan	Vayalar Ramavarma
1971	Aabhijathyam	Kalyaanakkuruvikku		A. T. Ummer	P. Bhaskaran
1971	Aakashaganga	Panchavankaattile		R. K. Shekhar	Sreekumaran Thampi
1971	Aakashaganga	Sneha Nandini	Radha	R. K. Shekhar	Sreekumaran Thampi
1971	Aana Valarthiya Vanampadiyude Makan	Jaam Jaam Jamennu	K. J. Yesudas	K. V. Mahadevan	O. N. V. Kurup
1971	Aana Valarthiya Vanampadiyude Makan	Raajaavinte Thirumakanu	P. Madhuri	K. V. Mahadevan	O. N. V. Kurup
1971	Anubhavangal Paalichakal	Sarvaraajyathozhilalikale	K. J. Yesudas	G. Devarajan	Vayalar Ramavarma
1971	C.I.D. Nazir	Thenmala Poyi Varumpam	K. P. Chandramohan	M. K. Arjunan	Sreekumaran Thampi
1971	Ernakulam Junction	Mullamalarthen Kinnam [Bit]	P. Jayachandran	M. S. Baburaj	P. Bhaskaran
1971	Ernakulam Junction	Mullamalarthenkinnam	P. Jayachandran	M. S. Baburaj	P. Bhaskaran
1971	Inqulab Zindabbad	Aarude Manassile		G. Devarajan	O. V. Usha
1971	Jalakanyaka	Onne Onne Po Po		A. T. Ummer	Dr. Pavithran
1971	Kochaniyathi	Thinkaleppole Chirikkunna		Pukazhenthi	Sreekumaran Thampi
1971	Kuttyedathi	Chithralekhe Priyamvade	Machad Vasanthi	M. S. Baburaj	Sreekumaran Thampi
1971	Line Bus	Minnum Ponnim Kireedam		G. Devarajan	Vayalar Ramavarma
1971	Marunnattil Oru Malayali	Kaali Bhadrakali	P. Jayachandran	V. Dakshinamoorthy	Sreekumaran Thampi
1971	Marunnattil Oru Malayali	Swargavaathil Ekaadashi		V. Dakshinamoorthy	Sreekumaran Thampi
1971	Oru Penninte Katha	Maanavum Bhoomiyum		G. Devarajan	Vayalar Ramavarma
1971	Poompatta	Manathaarileppozhum	Renuka	G. Devarajan	Yusufali Kechery
1971	Vimochanasamaram	Prapancha Hridaya	S. Janaki	M. B. Sreenivasan	Mankombu Gopalakrishnan
1972	Baalyaprathijna	Marathakappattudutha Vilaasini	P. Jayachandran, J. M. Raju & P. R. Nirmala	K. K. Antony	P. Bhaskaran
1972	Bhaja Govindam	Karuna Cheyvaanenthu		Jaya Vijaya	Bichu Thirumala
1972	Maaya	Dhanumaasathil Thiruvaathira		V. Dakshinamoorthy	Sreekumaran Thampi
1972	Mayiladumkunnu	Thaalikkuruthola		G. Devarajan	Vayalar Ramavarma
1972	Miss Mary	Gandharva Gaayakaa		R. K. Shekhar	Sreekumaran Thampi
1972	Professor	Kanyaakumaarikkadappurathu [Pathos][Bit]		G. Devarajan	Vayalar Ramavarma
1972	Professor	Kanyaakumaarikkadappurathu		G. Devarajan	Vayalar Ramavarma
1972	Punarjanmam	Unnikkai Valaru		G. Devarajan	Vayalar Ramavarma
1972	Puthrakameshti	Enikku Melammo	K. J. Yesudas & Adoor Pankajam	V. Dakshinamoorthy	Vayalar Ramavarma
1972	Sambhavami Yuge Yuge	Naadodimannante	P. Jayachandran & M. S. Baburaj	M. S. Baburaj	Sreekumaran Thampi
1972	Sree Guruvayoorappan	Peelippoomudi	Soolamngalam Rajalakshmi	V. Dakshinamoorthy	O. N. V. Kurup
1972	Sree Guruvayoorappan	Thaapangal Akattuka		V. Dakshinamoorthy	O. N. V. Kurup
1972	Theerthayathra	Theerthayaathra Theerthayaathra		A. T. Ummer	P. Bhaskaran
1973	Aaradhika	Sangeethamaathmaavin Sougandhikam	B. Vasantha	M. S. Baburaj	Sreekumaran Thampi
1973	Aashachakram	Poonkozhi Thannude	K. J. Yesudas	B. A. Chidambaranath	P. Bhaskaran
1973	Ajnathavasam	Kaaverippoompattanathil	K. P. Brahmanandan	M. K. Arjunan	Sreekumaran Thampi
1973	Azhakulla Saleena	Snehathin Idayanaam		K. J. Yesudas	Volbrecht Nagel
1973	Chukku	Sankrama Vishuppakshi		G. Devarajan	Vayalar Ramavarma
1973	Divyadarshanam	Anila Tharala (Bit)		M. S. Viswanathan	
1973	Divyadarshanam	Ha Ha Vallabhe		M. S. Viswanathan	Thunchaththu Ezhuthachan
1973	Divyadarshanam	Haa Raamaputhraa		M. S. Viswanathan	Thunchaththu Ezhuthachan
1973	Divyadarshanam	Kunnukal Pole		M. S. Viswanathan	Thunchaththu Ezhuthachan
1973	Divyadarshanam	Thripurasundari		M. S. Viswanathan	Sreekumaran Thampi
1973	Eanippadikal	Pankajaakshan Kadalvarnan		G. Devarajan	Vayalar Ramavarma
1973	Football Champion	Kaikottikali		V. Dakshinamoorthy	Sreekumaran Thampi
1973	Jesus	Hosana	P. Jayachandran & K.P. Brahmanandan	Alleppey Ranganath	Augustine Vanchimala
1973	Kaliyugam	Bhoomi Petta Makalallo	P. Madhuri	G. Devarajan	Vayalar Ramavarma
1973	Madhavikutty	Maveli Naduvaneedum Kalam		G. Devarajan	Vayalar Ramavarma
1973	Masappady Mathupillai	Swarnamurukkiyozhichapole	P. Madhuri	G. Devarajan	Kilimanoor Ramakanthan
1973	Pavangal Pennungal	Swarnakhanikalude	P. Susheela & P. Madhuri	G. Devarajan	Vayalar Ramavarma
1973	Pachanottukal	Pandu Pandoru Sanyaasi		M. K. Arjunan	Sreekumaran Thampi
1973	Padmavyooham	Panchavadiyile	P. Jayachandran	M. K. Arjunan	Sreekumaran Thampi
1973	Ponnapuram Kotta	Aadiparaashakthi	K. J. Yesudas, P. Susheela, P. Madhuri & P. B. Sreenivas	G. Devarajan	Vayalar Ramavarma
1973	Sasthram Jayichu Manushyan Thottu	Ponnin Chinga		V. Dakshinamoorthy	Sreekumaran Thampi
1973	Thiruvabharanam	Ettupaaduvan Mathramaay	K. J. Yesudas	R. K. Shekhar	Sreekumaran Thampi
1973	Urvashi Bharathi	Onnichu Kalichu Valarnnu		V. Dakshinamoorthy	Thikkurissy Sukumaran Nair
1974	Alakal	Premanubhoothiyumaayennil		V. Dakshinamoorthy	Mankombu Gopalakrishnan
1974	Angathattu	Ankathattukaluyarnna Naadu	P. Madhuri & Ayiroor Sadasivan	G. Devarajan	Vayalar Ramavarma
1974	Chattakkari	Naarayanaaya Nama		G. Devarajan	Vayalar Ramavarma
1974	Honeymoon	Jalatharangame Paadu	P. Jayachandran	M. K. Arjunan	Sreekumaran Thampi
1974	Kanyakumari	Aayiram Kannulla	K. J. Yesudas & L. R. Eswari	M. B. Sreenivasan	Vayalar Ramavarma
1974	Poonthenaruvi	Thankakkudame	P. Jayachandran & Rajmohan	M. K. Arjunan	Sreekumaran Thampi
1975	Chattambikkalyaani	Ammamaare Vishakkunnu	Latha Devi	M. K. Arjunan	Sreekumaran Thampi
1975	Chuvanna Sandhyakal	Achyuthaananda		G. Devarajan	Vayalar Ramavarma
1975	Mattoru Seetha	Kaamini Mouliyaam	Ayiroor Sadasivan & T. R. Omana	V. Dakshinamoorthy	P. Bhaskaran
1975	Mattoru Seetha	Udayathaaraka	Ayiroor Sadasivan & T. R. Omana	V. Dakshinamoorthy	P. Bhaskaran
1975	Swami Ayyappan	Kailaasa Shailaadhi	Sreekanth	G. Devarajan	Vayalar Ramavarma
1976	Ammini Ammaavan	Thankakkanikkonna	P. Madhuri	G. Devarajan	Mankombu Gopalakrishnan
1976	Anaavaranam	Nanma Niranjoru	P. Madhuri	G. Devarajan	Vayalar Ramavarma
1976	Appooppan (Charithram Aavarthikkunnilla)	Nilledi Nilledi Neeyallayo	Raveendran & C. O. Anto	M. S. Baburaj	P. Bhaskaran
1976	Kuttavum Shikshayum	Kannanaamunni	P. Susheela	M. S. Viswanathan	Mankombu Gopalakrishnan
1976	Ponni	Kaaveri Thalakkaaveri	P. Madhuri & C. O. Anto	G. Devarajan	P. Bhaskaran
1976	Ponni	Maattupponkal	P. Jayachandran, P. Madhuri & Sreekanth	G. Devarajan	P. Bhaskaran
1976	Ponni	Sinkarappenninte	P. Madhuri	G. Devarajan	P. Bhaskaran
1976	Ponni	Thenkaashi	P. Jayachandran, P. Madhuri & Sreekanth	G. Devarajan	P. Bhaskaran
1977	Agninakshathram	Chentheekkanal Chinnum	P. Madhuri & Latha Raju	G. Devarajan	Sasikala Menon
1977	Guruvayur Kesavan	Sundara Swapname	K. J. Yesudas	G. Devarajan	P. Bhaskaran
1977	Jagadguru Aadisankaran	Dadhya Dayanupavano (Kanakadharasthavam)		V. Dakshinamoorthy	Sankaracharyar
1977	Jagadguru Aadisankaran	Gange cha Yamune Chaiva Godavari		V. Dakshinamoorthy	Sankaracharyar
1977	Sreedevi	Nrithyathi Nrithyathi		G. Devarajan	
1977	Sreemad Bhagavad Geetha	Indraprasthathinnadhinaayakane		V. Dakshinamoorthy	P. Bhaskaran
1977	Thuruppugulan	Govinda Naama Sankeerthanam	Jolly Abraham	V. Dakshinamoorthy	Sreekumaran Thampi
1977	Vezhambal (Ahalyamoksham)	Sree Mahaalakshmi		M. K. Arjunan	Vayalar Ramavarma
1977	Yudhakaandam	Thanne Kaamicheedaathe		K. Raghavan	O. N. V. Kurup
1978	Pichipoo	Bhavabhaya Vinaashini		Jaya Vijaya	P. Bhaskaran
1979	Indradhanussu	Vijayam Vijayam	P. Jayachandran & Ambili	M. S. Viswanathan	Chirayinkeezhu Ramakrishnan Nair

=== 1980s ===
Year	Movie/Album	Song	Co-singers	Music Director	Lyricist
1980	Ithikkara Pakki	Vayanaadan Varamanjal	Ambili	P. S. Divakar	Bichu Thirumala
1988	Oru Muthassi Katha	Kadappurathe Chaakara	M. G. Sreekumar & C. O. Anto	Ouseppachan	Shibu Chakravarthy
1988	Oru Muthassi Katha	Nalla Muthassiyamma	M. G. Sreekumar, Sujatha Mohan & C. O. Anto	Ouseppachan	Shibu Chakravarthy
1988	Oru Muthassi Katha	Pandathe Paattile [Bit]		Ouseppachan	Shibu Chakravarthy

=== 1990s ===
Year	Movie/Album	Song	Co-singers	Music Director	Lyricist
1991	Ente Sooryaputhrikku	Sree sivasutha		Ilaiyaraaja	Ilaiyaraaja
1998	Thirakalkkappuram	Karayude Maaril Thalodi	K. J. Yesudas	Johnson	Yusufali Kechery

== Tamil discography ==
=== 1940s ===
Year	Movie/Album	Song	Co-singers	Music Director	Lyricist
1947	Miss Malini	Kulikkanum Kalikkanum		S. Rajeswara Rao & Parur S. Anantharaman	Kothamangalam Subbu
1948	Idhu Nijama	Mara Malar	S. Balachander	S. Balachander	M. S. Subramaniam
1948	Kangkanam			H. R. Padmanabha Sastry	Kambadasan
1948	Mohini	Aahaa Ivar Yaaradi	K. V. Janaki	S. M. Subbaiah Naidu & C. R. Subburaman	
1948	Thirumalisai Alvar	Giridhari		S. V. Venkatraman	Papanasam Sivan
1949	Inbavalli	Jagadamba	P. A. Periyanayaki	G. Ramanathan	
1949	Inbavalli	Inbamana Mohini Maane	T. R. Mahalingam	G. Ramanathan	
1949	Inbavalli	Maalai Sooda Avar Vanthaaradi		G. Ramanathan	
1949	Inbavalli	Nee Thunai Purivaaiye		G. Ramanathan	
1949	Laila Majnu	Oru Ooril Oru Raaja		S. M. Subbaiah Naidu & C. R. Subburaman	S. D. Sundharam
1949	Laila Majnu	Kuliridhe Suvai Madhu	Jikki	S. M. Subbaiah Naidu & C. R. Subburaman	S. D. Sundharam
1949	Laila Majnu	Kannaadi Kanni Neeye	Jikki	S. M. Subbaiah Naidu & C. R. Subburaman	S. D. Sundharam
1949	Velaikkaari	Oridam Thanile Nilaiyillaa Ulaginile	K. V. Janaki	C. R. Subburaman	Udumalai Narayana Kavi
1949	Velaikkaari	Laali Laali Suba Laali Laali	T. V. Rathnam	C. R. Subburaman	Udumalai Narayana Kavi

=== 1950s ===
Year	Movie/Album	Song	Co-singers	Music Director	Lyricist
1950	Chandrika	Lilly Puppy Lilly Puppy		V. Dakshinamoorthy & G. Govindarajulu Naidu	P. Bhaskaran
1950	Chandrika	Vinnin Thaarai Pole		V. Dakshinamoorthy & G. Govindarajulu Naidu	P. Bhaskaran
1950	Digambara Samiyar	Naathar Mudi Meliruukkum		G. Ramanathan & S. M. Subbaiah Naidu	Pambatti Siddhar
1950	Digambara Samiyar	Mappillai Paar Asal	Jikki	G. Ramanathan & S. M. Subbaiah Naidu	
1950	Digambara Samiyar	Ennathaan Uraitthaalum	Jikki	G. Ramanathan & S. M. Subbaiah Naidu	
1950	Digambara Samiyar	En Idam Vizhai Thalam		G. Ramanathan & S. M. Subbaiah Naidu	
1950	Digambara Samiyar	En Adasay Azhiga Raja		G. Ramanathan & S. M. Subbaiah Naidu	
1950	Ithaya Geetham	Juma Juma Jum Jum	P. A. Periyanayaki	S. V. Venkatraman	
1950	Krishna Vijayam	Ennadi Aniyaayam Idhu	K. V. Janaki, T. V. Rathnam, T. R. Bhagirathi & K. S. Angamuthu	C. S. Jayaraman & S. M. Subbaiah Naidu	
1950	Lakshmamma		C. R. Subburaman		
1950	Manthiri Kumari	O Raja O Rani Indha Ezhaiyeliya	N. Lalitha & U. R. Chandra	G. Ramanathan	
1950	Marudhanaattu Ilavarasi	Veerathaayai Panivom		M. S. Gnanmani	
1950	Parijatham	Enathannai Unnai		C. R. Subburaman & S. V. Venkatraman	Papanasam Sivan
1950	Parijatham	Jeeva Theebame Thalelo	Jikki	C. R. Subburaman & S. V. Venkatraman	Kambadasan
1950	Vijayakumari	Geethanantham Perinbam	M. L. Vasanthakumari	C. R. Subburaman	
1950	Vijayakumari	Kondaadum Subathiname	T. V. Rathnam	C. R. Subburaman	Udumalai Narayana Kavi
1950	Devaki	Perinbame Vaazhvile Endrume	Thiruchi Loganathan	G. Ramanathan	A. Maruthakasi
1950	Devaki	Naan Kaanbeno Sodhariyaale	Jikki	G. Ramanathan	
1950	Devaki	Ennathaan Kidaithaalum	Jikki	G. Ramanathan	
1950	Devaki	Annaiye Naan Anaadhai		G. Ramanathan	
1950	Devaki	Chandhiranai Vaanam Thalli		G. Ramanathan	
1951	Manamagal	Ellaam Inbamayam	M. L. Vasanthakumari	C. R. Subburaman	Udumalai Narayana Kavi
1951	Manamagal	Aayirathu Tholaayirathu	M. L. Vasanthakumari	C. R. Subburaman	Udumalai Narayana Kavi
1951	Manamagal	Aadiduven Nadanam Aadiduven		C. R. Subburaman	Udumalai Narayana Kavi
1951	Mayamalai			P. Adinarayana Rao	
1951	Mohana Sundaram	Oyillana Mayilattam	K. Rani	T. G. Lingappa	K. D. Santhanam
1951	Pathala Bhairavi	Ennathaan Un Premaiyo	Ghantasala	Ghantasala	Thanjai N. Ramaiah Dass
1951	Pathala Bhairavi	Amaithi Illathen Maname	Ghantasala	Ghantasala	Thanjai N. Ramaiah Dass
1951	Pathala Bhairavi	Kanintha Kadhalarukku	Ghantasala	Ghantasala	Thanjai N. Ramaiah Dass
1951	Pathala Bhairavi	Aananthame Tharum		Ghantasala	Thanjai N. Ramaiah Dass
1951	Pichaikkari	Vanaraniye Endhan Manaraniye	Thiruchi Loganathan	V. Dakshinamoorthy	P. Aadhimoolan
1951	Pichaikkari	Yaaradi Kalli Neethaan	Thiruchi Loganathan	V. Dakshinamoorthy	P. Aadhimoolan
1951	Pichaikkari	Kaarmugil Keeri Velippadum	Thiruchi Loganathan & Kaviyoor Revamma	V. Dakshinamoorthy	P. Aadhimoolan
1951	Pichaikkari	Baahi Thaaye Paarvathi		V. Dakshinamoorthy	P. Aadhimoolan
1951	Pichaikkari	Joraaga Uduthe Naane		V. Dakshinamoorthy	P. Aadhimoolan
1951	Pichaikkari	Neeyethaane Eesan Thunai		V. Dakshinamoorthy	P. Aadhimoolan
1951	Pichaikkari	Vaai Niraiya Vennai		V. Dakshinamoorthy	P. Aadhimoolan
1951	Rajambal	Kani Mozhi Maadhae	A. M. Rajah	M. S. Gnanamani	A. Maruthakasi
1951	Rajambal	Thathina Theen Pasi Theeruma		M. S. Gnanamani	A. Maruthakasi
1951	Rajambal	Jayame Vaazhvil Peruvaen		M. S. Gnanamani	A. Maruthakasi
1951	Rajambal	Idhaya Thaamarai Malara Cheyvadhum	V. N. Sundaram	M. S. Gnanamani	A. Maruthakasi
1951	Rajambal	Maadhar Maniye Vaa	S. Balachander	M. S. Gnanamani	A. Maruthakasi
1951	Samsaram	Aararo Aararo Arumai Kumara		Emani Sankara Sastri	Kothamangalam Subbu
1951	Samsaram	Ezhai Engu Selvaen		Emani Sankara Sastri	Kothamangalam Subbu
1951	Sarvadhikari	Kannaalan Varuvaar Kann Munne		S. Dakshinamurthi	A. Maruthakasi
1951	Sarvadhikari	Aanazhagaa Enadhu Kaigal Seidha	Thiruchi Loganathan	S. Dakshinamurthi	Ka. Mu. Sheriff
1951	Sarvadhikari	Aaandavanai.... Puvi Mele Padhavigalaiye		S. Dakshinamurthi	Ka. Mu. Sheriff
1951	Sarvadhikari	Alliyin Mun Vennila Vandhadhai		S. Dakshinamurthi	
1951	Singari	Paalu Paalu Pasum Paalu	P. A. Periyanayaki	T. A. Kalyanam, S. V. Venkatraman & T. R. Ramanathan	Thanjai N. Ramaiah Dass
1951	Singari	Jighu Jighu Samakku Paarungo		T. A. Kalyanam, S. V. Venkatraman & T. R. Ramanathan	Thanjai N. Ramaiah Dass
1951	Singari	O! Chellaiah Nee Vallaiah		T. A. Kalyanam, S. V. Venkatraman & T. R. Ramanathan	Thanjai N. Ramaiah Dass
1951	Singari	Kaanil Vennilaa Poleh		T. A. Kalyanam, S. V. Venkatraman & T. R. Ramanathan	Thanjai N. Ramaiah Dass
1951	Singari	Bhaarathi Enge Solladi		T. A. Kalyanam, S. V. Venkatraman & T. R. Ramanathan	Thanjai N. Ramaiah Dass
1951	Singari	Vaanavillaipoleh Oru Vaaliban		T. A. Kalyanam, S. V. Venkatraman & T. R. Ramanathan	K. P. Kamatchi Sundaram
1951	Vanasundari	Vinnil Inbam .. Vandu Pola Aadi Sellum Odame	P. A. Periyanayaki	S. V. Venkatraman & C. R. Subburaman	Kambadasan
1951	Vanasundari	Deeyo Deeyo Deeyaalo	P. A. Periyanayaki & K. V. Janaki	S. V. Venkatraman & C. R. Subburaman	Udumalai Narayana Kavi
1952	Amarakavi	Chedi Maraivile Oru Poongodi	M. K. Thyagaraja Bhagavathar	G. Ramanathan & T. A. Kalyanam	Suratha
1952	Amarakavi	Yaanai Thandham Pole	M. K. Thyagaraja Bhagavathar	G. Ramanathan & T. A. Kalyanam	Suratha
1952	Amarakavi	Konji Pesum Kiliye	M. K. Thyagaraja Bhagavathar	G. Ramanathan & T. A. Kalyanam	Suratha
1952	Amarakavi	Mullaich Chirippile	N. L. Ganasaraswathi	G. Ramanathan & T. A. Kalyanam	Lakshmanadas
1952	Amarakavi	Mookuthi Minnudhu	N. L. Ganasaraswathi	G. Ramanathan & T. A. Kalyanam	Lakshmanadas
1952	Amma	Jayamundu Bayamillai Maname		V. Dakshinamurthy	Mahakavi Bharathiyar
1952	Amma	Vedhanaiyaal Kann Kalangkida		V. Dakshinamurthy	Chidambaram Varadarajan
1952	Amma	Padagae Namadhu Thunaiye	V. Dakshinamurthy	V. Dakshinamurthy	Chidambaram Varadarajan
1952	Amma	Aandavan Padaipilae	V. Dakshinamurthy	V. Dakshinamurthy	Chidambaram Varadarajan
1952	Amma	Nal Thiruvonam Varudhe	V. Dakshinamurthy	V. Dakshinamurthy	Chidambaram Varadarajan
1952	Andhaman Kaidhi	Vaazhvin Jeevan Kaadhale		G. Govindarajulu Naidu	Ku. Sa. Krishnamurthy
1952	Andhaman Kaidhi	O Balu.... Vanna Malar Thannai Kandu	T. A. Mothi	G. Govindarajulu Naidu	Ku. Sa. Krishnamurthy
1952	Aathmasanthi	Pudhu Rojaap Pole	T. A. Mothi	T. R. Pappa	T. N. Rajappa
1952	En Thangai	Aadum Oonjalai Pole	T. A. Mothi	C. N. Pandurangan	Suratha
1952	En Thangai	Kaadhal Vaazhvile Magizhndhom	T. A. Mothi	C. N. Pandurangan	Bharathidasan
1952	En Thangai	Inbame Siridhum Ariyaadha		C. N. Pandurangan	Saravanabhavananthar
1952	Gramathu Penn	Prakasam Pole Premaiyinaale	A. M. Rajah	Naushad	
1952	Kalyanam Pannippaar	Yaaro Yaaro	Ghantasala	Ghantasala	Thanjai N. Ramaiah Dass
1952	Kalyanam Pannippaar	Azhuvaadhe Azhuvaadhe	Pithapuram Nageswara Rao & Udutha Sarojini	Ghantasala	Thanjai N. Ramaiah Dass
1952	Kalyanam Pannippaar	Brammave Ye Brammave	K. Rani & Udutha Sarojini	Ghantasala	Thanjai N. Ramaiah Dass
1952	Kalyanam Pannippaar	Engu Sendraayo Priyaa	Pithapuram Nageswara Rao & K. Rani	Ghantasala	Thanjai N. Ramaiah Dass
1952	Kalyanam Pannippaar	Maname Ennai Arivaayo		Ghantasala	Thanjai N. Ramaiah Dass
1952	Kalyanam Pannippaar	Ezhumalai Aaandavane Venkataramana		Ghantasala	Thanjai N. Ramaiah Dass
1952	Kalyani	Atho Paaradi Avare		S. Dakshinamurthi & G. Ramanathan	Kannadasan
1952	Kalyani	Kaalamellaam Endhan Vaazhvil		S. Dakshinamurthi & G. Ramanathan	Kannadasan
1952	Kumari	O Ambuliye Vaa		K. V. Mahadevan	M. P. Sivam
1952	Kumari	Adhairiyam Kolvadhu Ariveenam .. Prakaasam Poley	A. M. Rajah	K. V. Mahadevan	M. P. Sivam
1952	Kumari	Alaiyaadum Poley		K. V. Mahadevan	M. P. Sivam
1952	Manavathi	Eno Ezhupinaan		H. R. Padmanabha Sastry & B. Rajanikanta Rao	Chidambaram A. M. Nataraja Kavi
1952	Manavathi	Maamalar Vaname		H. R. Padmanabha Sastry & B. Rajanikanta Rao	Chidambaram A. M. Nataraja Kavi
1952	Manavathi	En Maasaki En Maasaki	S. Rajam	H. R. Padmanabha Sastry & B. Rajanikanta Rao	Chidambaram A. M. Nataraja Kavi
1952	Manavathi	Punya Deviye	S. Rajam	H. R. Padmanabha Sastry & B. Rajanikanta Rao	Chidambaram A. M. Nataraja Kavi
1952	Mappillai	Kadhalil Vignanam	A. M. Rajah	T. R. Pappa & N. S. Balakrishnan	Thanjai N. Ramaiah Dass
1952	Mappillai	Kannum Karutha Kudumbam		T. R. Pappa & N. S. Balakrishnan	Thanjai N. Ramaiah Dass
1952	Mappillai	Sirandha Ulaginile	Soolamangalam Rajalakshmi	T. R. Pappa & N. S. Balakrishnan	Thanjai N. Ramaiah Dass
1952	Mappillai	Inbame Siridhum Ariyaadha		T. R. Pappa & N. S. Balakrishnan	Thanjai N. Ramaiah Dass
1952	Mappillai	anneerthaan.... Pennaaga Pirandhaal		T. R. Pappa & N. S. Balakrishnan	Thanjai N. Ramaiah Dass
1952	Moondru Pillaigal	Maalai Tharitha Maharaasi	Radha Jayalakshmi	P. S. Anantharaman & M. D. Parthasarathy	Kothamangalam Subbu
1952	Moondru Pillaigal	Poorana Chandirane		P. S. Anantharaman & M. D. Parthasarathy	Kothamangalam Subbu
1952	Moondru Pillaigal	Yaaridam Solluven		P. S. Anantharaman & M. D. Parthasarathy	V. Seetharaman
1952	Pasiyin Kodumai	Mohiniye En Mohiniye	A. M. Rajah	P. S. Divakar	Kambadasan
1952	Pasiyin Kodumai	Naane Kalaiyil Therinen		P. S. Divakar	Annal Thango
1952	Pasiyin Kodumai	Ilavenil Chandrikaiyaai	A. M. Rajah	P. S. Divakar	
1952	Pasiyin Kodumai	Poo Nirai Maamara Cholai	A. M. Rajah, Madhavapeddi Satyam & Kaviyoor Revamma	P. S. Divakar	Pa. Adhimoolam
1952	Priyaasakhi	Vinnirul Thannidam	T. A. Mothi	Br Lakshmanan	
1952	Zamindar	Thunbam Menmelum Soozhnthaal	A. M. Rajah	G. Ramanathan	Ka. Mu. Sheriff
1953	Aasai Magan	Rajave Nalla Rojavai Paar		V. Dakshinamoorthy	Kuyilan
1953	Aasai Magan	Paayum Kangalaal .. Kaalil Thanga Salangai	V. J. Varma	V. Dakshinamoorthy	Kuyilan
1953	Aasai Magan	Thaalelo Raajaa En Kanne		V. Dakshinamoorthy	Kuyilan
1953	Aasai Magan	Kalaigal Migundha Engal Thamizh Vaazhgave	M. L. Vasanthakumari	V. Dakshinamoorthy	Kuyilan
1953	Aasai Magan	Maanida Vaazhvidhuve	V. Dakshinamoorthy	V. Dakshinamoorthy	Kuyilan
1953	Aasai Magan	Odameri Chendre Kaadhal Kanaavile	A. M. Rajah	V. Dakshinamoorthy	Kuyilan
1953	Genova	Thunai Neeye Dheva Thaaye		M. S. Viswanathan, M. S. Gnanamani & T. A. Kalyanam	Rajamani
1953	Genova	Kannukkul Minnal	A. M. Rajah	M. S. Viswanathan, M. S. Gnanamani & T. A. Kalyanam	Suratha
1953	Genova	Kadhal Vaazhvil Naane	A. M. Rajah	M. S. Viswanathan, M. S. Gnanamani & T. A. Kalyanam	Suratha
1953	Genova	Aasai Alai Modhudhe	A. M. Rajah	M. S. Viswanathan, M. S. Gnanamani & T. A. Kalyanam	Rajamani
1953	Gumastha	Aasaiye Veennanadhe		G. Ramanathan, V. Nagayya & C. N. Pandurangan	A. Maruthakasi
1953	Madana Mohini	Vaanaveedhiyile Vilaiyaadum Vennilaave		K. V. Mahadevan	M. P. Sivam
1953	Madana Mohini	Inimaiyaana Neram		K. V. Mahadevan	M. P. Sivam
1953	Madana Mohini	Kannodu Kannaayi Rahasiyam Pesi	K. V. Mahadevan	K. V. Mahadevan	M. P. Sivam
1953	Manam Pola Mangalyam	Maappillai Doi	A. M. Rajah	Addepalli Rama Rao	Kanaka Surabhi
1953	Manam Pola Mangalyam	Pona Macchan		Addepalli Rama Rao	Kanaka Surabhi
1953	Manam Pola Mangalyam	Ellorukkum Vaaikkiradhu		Addepalli Rama Rao	Kanaka Surabhi
1953	Manithan	Kaasirundhaal Kai Maele		S. V. Venkatraman	Kanaka Surabhi
1953	Nalla Pillai	Nenjam Thidukkena Nilai Thadumaari		C. Ramchandra	
1953	Nalla Pillai	Egaandha Raajaa Nee Aanandhame		C. Ramchandra	
1953	Nalla Pillai	Aaambale Nee Jannal Kitte	A. M. Rajah	C. Ramchandra	
1953	Nalla Pillai	En Aasai Raadhaa Nee Aanandhame	A. M. Rajah	C. Ramchandra	
1953	Nalla Pillai	Mai Vizhi Mel Paaindhu Odiye	A. M. Rajah	C. Ramchandra	
1953	Nalla Pillai	Mani Aditthadhanaal	A. M. Rajah	C. Ramchandra	
1953	Nalla Pillai	Priyamaai Mahaaraajaa		C. Ramchandra	
1953	Panakkaari	Beautyile Pottiyile.... Isaintha Kaathaliyai Kettu		S. V. Venkatraman	
1953	Panakkaari	Ammaavendre Nee Azhaithidum		S. V. Venkatraman	
1953	Paropakaram	Jayam Tharum Deivame		Ghantasala	Kavi Lakshmanadas
1953	Paropakaram	Ullamadhil Edho Thulli		Ghantasala	Kavi Lakshmanadas
1953	Paropakaram	Vaazhve Sogam Thaanaa	Ghantasala, A. M. Rajah & A. P. Komala	Ghantasala	Kavi Lakshmanadas
1953	Paropakaram	Kangal Sorndhu		Ghantasala	Kavi Lakshmanadas
1953	Thanthai	Ilavenil Chandrikaiyaai	A. M. Rajah	P. S. Divakar	Kambadasan
1953	Thanthai	Devaney Dheena Thayaaparaney	V. J. Varma	P. S. Divakar	Kambadasan
1953	Thanthai	Paaraayi Kalaimaanin		P. S. Divakar	Kambadasan
1953	Thanthai	Inbam Inbame		P. S. Divakar	Kambadasan
1953	Thirumbi Paar	Kannaale Panpaadum	Thiruchi Loganathan	G. Ramanathan	Kannadasan
1953	Thirumbi Paar	Kannalla Thoongamma		G. Ramanathan	Kannadasan
1953	Thirumbi Paar	Paandiyan En Sollai		G. Ramanathan	Bharathidasan
1953	Ulagam	Isai Paadi Naanume	A. M. Rajah	M. S. Gnanamani	
1953	Vazha Pirandhaval	Inbathaale Pongudhe En Idhayam	T. A. Mothi	G. Ramanathan & S. Rajeswara Rao	Ka. Mu. Sheriff
1953	Vazha Pirandhaval	Vaazhvennum Uyar Nilaa Theyumo		G. Ramanathan & S. Rajeswara Rao	Ka. Mu. Sheriff
1953	Vazha Pirandhaval	Vaazha Pirandhaval Naan	T. A. Mothi & T. R. Rajakumari	G. Ramanathan & S. Rajeswara Rao	Ka. Mu. Sheriff
1953	Velaikari Magal	Pudhumai Innaale Pugazh Thirunaale		C. R. Subburaman & S. Dakshinamurthi	K. D. Santhanam
1953	Velaikari Magal	Aththai Veedu Sugamillai	A. P. Komala & Pithapuram Nageswara Rao	C. R. Subburaman & S. Dakshinamurthi	K. D. Santhanam
1954	Chandraharam	Arul Purivaai Ammaa		Ghantasala	Thanjai N. Ramaiah Dass
1954	Chandraharam	Thayavillaiyo En Kurai Kelaayo		Ghantasala	Thanjai N. Ramaiah Dass
1954	Chandraharam	Jagam Meedhil Alai Modhum		Ghantasala	Thanjai N. Ramaiah Dass
1954	Edhir Paradhathu	Madhuraapuri Aalum Magaraaniye		C. N. Pandurangan	Kanaka Surabhi
1954	Illara Jothi	Siruvizhi Kurunagai		G. Ramanathan	Kannadasan
1954	Illara Jothi	Ketpadhellam Kaadhal Geedhangale		G. Ramanathan	Kannadasan
1954	Illara Jothi	Kalai Thenoorum Kanni Thamizh	A. M. Rajah	G. Ramanathan	Kannadasan
1954	Irulukku Pin			Br Lakshmanan	
1954	Kudumbam	Azhuthu Azhuthu Sorndha		Pendyala Nageswara Rao	M. S. Subramaniam
1954	Kudumbam	Paartheeraa Ivar Sarasam	Ghantasala	Pendyala Nageswara Rao	M. S. Subramaniam
1954	Nanban	Jayamarul Sadhaa Kajavaradha		G. Ramanathan	Thanjai N. Ramaiah Dass
1954	Nanban	Kan Sollum Kaadhal	Thiruchi Loganathan	G. Ramanathan	Thanjai N. Ramaiah Dass
1954	Pona Machaan Thirumbi Vandhan	Pennai Veettil	A. G. Rathnamala	M. S. Viswanathan & C. N. Pandurangan	V. Seetharaman
1954	Pudhu Yugam	Pudhu Yugam, Pudhu Yugam	Jikki	G. Ramanathan	A. Maruthakasi
1954	Pudhu Yugam	Kaadhal Kondu Poovil Vandu	Ghantasala	G. Ramanathan	A. Maruthakasi
1954	Pudhu Yugam	Vaazhvinile Inba Saubhagyam		G. Ramanathan	A. Maruthakasi
1954	Ratha Paasam	Panam Irukkira Manushangitta		M. K. Athmanathan & A. V. Natarajan	Ku. Ma. Balasubramaniam
1954	Ratha Paasam	O En Raajaa		M. K. Athmanathan & A. V. Natarajan	M. K. Athmanathan
1954	Sorgavasal	Maavodu Thazhuvum Malarkkodi Pole	K. R. Ramasamy	Viswanathan–Ramamoorthy	Udumalai Narayana Kavi
1954	Thookku Thookki	Sundhari Soundhari Nirandhariye	A. P. Komala & T. M. Soundararajan	G. Ramanathan	A. Maruthakasi
1954	Thookku Thookki	Kuranginilirundhu Pirandhavan Manidhan	A. P. Komala, T. M. Soundararajan & V. N. Sundaram	G. Ramanathan	Udumalai Narayana Kavi
1954	Thookku Thookki	Vaaranam Aayiram Soozha Valam Seidhu	M. L. Vasanthakumari	G. Ramanathan	Thiruppavai
1954	Thuli Visham	Manamilla Malarukkor Magimai Illai	A. G. Rathnamala	K. N. Dandayudhapani Pillai	K. P. Kamatchi Sundharam
1954	Vaira Maalai	Nadana Kala Rani	A. P. Komala & G. K. Venkatesh	Viswanathan–Ramamoorthy	Kannadasan
1955	C.I.D.	Inai Illaadha Suga Vaazhvil	A. M. Rajah, V. N. Sundaram & Udutha Sarojini	Br Lakshmanan	
1955	Doctor Savithri	Thensuvai Mevum Sendhamizh		G. Ramanathan	A. Maruthakasi
1955	Doctor Savithri	Moolai Veettukulle Mudangi		G. Ramanathan	Udumalai Narayana Kavi
1955	Ellam Inba Mayam	Singaara Sangeethame		Ghantasala	K. P. Kamatchi Sundaram
1955	Ellam Inba Mayam	Ulage Samaadhaana Aalamaram		Ghantasala	Kuyilan
1955	Ellam Inba Mayam	Kannai Parikkum Vannam	A. M. Rajah	Ghantasala	V. Seetharaman
1955	Ellam Inba Mayam	Haa Haa Vaazhve Ullaasame		Ghantasala	V. Seetharaman
1955	Ellam Inba Mayam	Oli Thandha Chudar Ponadhe		Ghantasala	Kuyilan
1955	Gomathiyin Kaadhalan	Ambigapathi Nadagam	T. V. Rathnam & Radha Jayalakshmi	G. Ramanathan	K. D. Santhanam
1955	Gruhalakshmi	Jaya Jaya Savithri Devi		B. S. Kalla, Sarala, T. A. Kalyanam & G. Nataraj	Papanasam Sivan
1955	Gruhalakshmi	O Settaiyyaa Sottaiyyaa		B. S. Kalla, Sarala, T. A. Kalyanam & G. Nataraj	Guhan
1955	Gruhalakshmi	Paapam Seydheno	K. Jamuna Rani	B. S. Kalla, Sarala, T. A. Kalyanam & G. Nataraj	Guhan
1955	Gulebakavali	Villendhum Veerarellam	Thiruchi Loganathan & G. K. Venkatesh	Viswanathan–Ramamoorthy	Thanjai N. Ramaiah Dass
1955	Gulebakavali	Villendhum Veerarellam	Thiruchi Loganathan	Viswanathan–Ramamoorthy	Thanjai N. Ramaiah Dass
1955	Gulebakavali	Kaiyai Thottathum	T. M. Sounderarajan	Viswanathan–Ramamoorthy	Thanjai N. Ramaiah Dass
1955	Guna Sundari	Karpanai Bavaaniye Karunaiyamudhe		Ghantasala	Thanjai N. Ramaiah Dass
1955	Guna Sundari	Ubagaara Gunaanidhiyaai Uruvaanavale		Ghantasala	Thanjai N. Ramaiah Dass
1955	Guna Sundari	Naan Seidha Poojaa Palan	A. M. Rajah	Ghantasala	Thanjai N. Ramaiah Dass
1955	Guna Sundari	O Maadhaa Vaaraai Kurai Kelaai		Ghantasala	Thanjai N. Ramaiah Dass
1955	Guna Sundari	Thiruvodu Enthidum Paradhesiyaam		Ghantasala	Thanjai N. Ramaiah Dass
1955	Jaya Simhan	Ekaantha Nilaiyaale	Ghantasala	T. V. Raju	
1955	Kanavaney Kankanda Deivam	Jaga Jothiyae		A. Rama Rao & Hemant Kumar	
1955	Kanavaney Kankanda Deivam	Amba Pethaikku Irangi		A. Rama Rao & Hemant Kumar	
1955	Kanavaney Kankanda Deivam	Intha Veenkobam	P. Susheela	A. Rama Rao & Hemant Kumar	
1955	Kathanayaki	Kodi Naatuven, Vetri Kodi Naatuven		G. Ramanathan	
1955	Kathanayaki	Adhirshtam Adhu Ishtamaaga Varuvadhu		G. Ramanathan	
1955	Kathanayaki	Perum Panathile Pirandhu	Swarnalatha	G. Ramanathan	
1955	Kaveri	Singaara Regaiyil Kaanudhu		G. Ramanathan, Viswanathan–Ramamoorthy & C. S. Jayaraman	Udumalai Narayana Kavi
1955	Kaveri	Kudithana Muraimai Padithida Venum	A. G. Rathnamala	G. Ramanathan, Viswanathan–Ramamoorthy & C. S. Jayaraman	Udumalai Narayana Kavi
1955	Koteeswaran	Vandhadu Yogam Vaazhvile	Jikki	S. V. Venkatraman	Thanjai N. Ramaiah Dass
1955	Koteeswaran	Arullilaarkku.... Bagavaane Kelaiiyaa Pachondhi		S. V. Venkatraman	Thanjai N. Ramaiah Dass
1955	Koteeswaran	Kattikko Thaali Kattikko	S. V. Venkatraman	S. V. Venkatraman	Gemini Seetharaman
1955	Koteeswaran	Isai Amudham Pol Undo		S. V. Venkatraman	Papanasam Sivan
1955	Latchadhipathi	Ammaa Ammaa Avani Maadhaa		T. Chalapathi Rao	K. S. Gopalakrishnan
1955	Latchadhipathi	Bhaaratha Thesamendre	Madhavapeddi Satyam	T. Chalapathi Rao	Mahakavi Bharatiyar
1955	Mangaiyar Thilakam	Baakkiyavathi Naan Baakkiyavathi		S. Dakshinamurthi	A. Maruthakasi
1955	Mangaiyar Thilakam	Engal Kula Dhevi Neeye		S. Dakshinamurthi	Kannadasan
1955	Mangaiyar Thilakam	Dheva Sadhaa Soga Thirunaalaam		S. Dakshinamurthi	Kannadasan
1955	Manoratham	Nilave Needhan Thoodhu Sellayo	Thiruchi Loganathan	G. Ramanathan	Thanjai N. Ramaiah Dass
1955	Manoratham	Raajaa Premaiyaal Alai Modhudhe	Thiruchi Loganathan	G. Ramanathan	Thanjai N. Ramaiah Dass
1955	Manoratham	Saamundeesvari Dhevi		G. Ramanathan	Thanjai N. Ramaiah Dass
1955	Menaka	O! Come Come Aiyaa Salaamunga		T. G. Lingappa, C. N. Pandurangan & Vedha	
1955	Missiamma	Vaarayo Vennilaave	A. M. Rajah	S. Rajeswara Rao	Thanjai N. Ramaiah Dass
1955	Missiamma	Raaga Rasa		S. Rajeswara Rao	Thanjai N. Ramaiah Dass
1955	Missiamma	Therinthu Kollanum Penne		S. Rajeswara Rao	Thanjai N. Ramaiah Dass
1955	Missiamma	Maayame Naanariyen		S. Rajeswara Rao	Thanjai N. Ramaiah Dass
1955	Missiamma	Ennai Aalum Mary Maadhaa		S. Rajeswara Rao	Thanjai N. Ramaiah Dass
1955	Missiamma	Sri Janaki	P. Susheela	S. Rajeswara Rao	Thanjai N. Ramaiah Dass
1955	Nalla Thangai	Ennai Pole Bhagyasaali	Jikki	G. Ramanathan	Ka. Mu. Sheriff
1955	Nalla Thangai	Maappille Makku Maappille	A. G. Rathnamala	G. Ramanathan	A. Maruthakasi
1955	Nalla Thangal	Kannin Karumaniye	Seerkazhi Govindarajan	G. Ramanathan	
1955	Nalla Thangal	Komala Sezhunthaamarai Ezhil Meviye	A. P. Komala, A. G. Rathnamala, T. V. Rathnam & Udutha Sarojini	G. Ramanathan	A. Maruthakasi
1955	Nalla Thangal	Annaiyum Thandhaiyum Illaadha		G. Ramanathan	A. Maruthakasi
1955	Nalla Thangal	Thingalodu Gangaiyai		G. Ramanathan	A. Maruthakasi
1955	Nalla Thangal	Komala Sezhunthaamarai Ezhil Meviye		G. Ramanathan	A. Maruthakasi
1955	Nallavan	Inbak Kalai Vaanil		M. S. Gnanamani	Thanjai N. Ramaiah Dass
1955	Nallavan	Paalaivana.... Kanneerum Kaanikkaiyaa Kadhal"		M. S. Gnanamani	Thanjai N. Ramaiah Dass
1955	Nallavan	Valluvar Vasugi Pol Illara	G. Kasthoori	M. S. Gnanamani	Thanjai N. Ramaiah Dass
1955	Nallavan	Vazhvil Inbam Kaanuma	Thiruchi Loganathan	M. S. Gnanamani	Thanjai N. Ramaiah Dass
1955	Nattiya Thara	Enindha Kaaval Amma Oyyaari		G. Ramanathan	Thanjai N. Ramaiah Dass
1955	Nattiya Thara	Athu Sammadhamaa		G. Ramanathan	Thanjai N. Ramaiah Dass
1955	Nattiya Thara	Aiyo Manaaru Saami		G. Ramanathan	Thanjai N. Ramaiah Dass
1955	Nattiya Thara	Sadhi Soozhchiyin Mosatthaale		G. Ramanathan	Thanjai N. Ramaiah Dass
1955	Pennarasi	Ulagam Chezhippathu Pennaaley		K. V. Mahadevan	A. Maruthakasi
1955	Ulagam Palavitham	Aasai Kanave Nee Vaa	T. M. Soundararajan	N. S. Balakrishnan	
1955	Ulagam Palavitham	Vaazhkai Odam	T. M. Soundararajan	N. S. Balakrishnan	
1956	Aasai	Aadi Paadi Odi Varum	T. V. Rathnam	T. R. Pappa	
1956	Aasai	Kalai Gnana Jothiyae		T. R. Pappa	
1956	Amara Geetham		Ghantasala	Ghantasala	
1956	Amara Geetham		Ghantasala	Ghantasala	
1956	Amara Geetham		Ghantasala	Ghantasala	
1956	Amara Geetham		Ghantasala	Ghantasala	
1956	Amara Geetham		Ghantasala	Ghantasala	
1956	Amara Geetham	Sirithathu Nilavu Sambangi Poovaai	Ghantasala	Ghantasala	
1956	Amara Geetham	Engethaan Engethaan Engethaan	Ghantasala	Ghantasala	
1956	Amara Geetham	Ennaalum Nee En		Ghantasala	
1956	Amara Geetham	Ilam Kaalai Aachey		Ghantasala	
1956	Amara Geetham	Kannpaarvai Irulaagi	Ghantasala	Ghantasala	
1956	Bale Raman	Kaanene Innum Kaanene	A. P. Komala	T. A. Kalyanam	Kanaga Surabhi
1956	Bale Raman	Engume Aanandham		T. A. Kalyanam	Kanaga Surabhi
1956	Bale Raman	Thaamadham En Endru		T. A. Kalyanam	Kanaga Surabhi
1956	Bale Raman	Sokku Podi Potta		T. A. Kalyanam	Kanaga Surabhi
1956	Kudumba Vilakku	Inidhaana Pechile	Ghantasala	T. R. Pappa	Kambadasan
1956	Kudumba Vilakku	Kannaa Nee Vaa	Ghantasala	T. R. Pappa	Puratchidasan
1956	Madurai Veeran	Summa Kidantha Sothukku Kashtam	Jikki	G. Ramanathan	Udumalai Narayana Kavi
1956	Madurai Veeran	Kundrutthor Aadi Varum		G. Ramanathan	Udumalai Narayana Kavi
1956	Madurai Veeran	Vaanga Machan Vaanga	T. M. Soundararajan	G. Ramanathan	Thanjai N. Ramaiah Dass
1956	Madurai Veeran	Vaanga Machan Vaanga		G. Ramanathan	Thanjai N. Ramaiah Dass
1956	Mandhiravadhi	Kannin Oli Paavai Pole	Seerkazhi Govindarajan	Br Lakshmanan	Muthukoothan
1956	Mandhiravadhi	Mahaa Sakthi Thaaye	Seerkazhi Govindarajan	Br Lakshmanan	Muthukoothan
1956	Mandhiravadhi	Paartha Kanngal		Br Lakshmanan	Muthukoothan
1956	Mangala Gowri			Ogirala Ramachandra Rao & T. V. Raju	
1956	Marma Veeran	Itthanai Naalaaga	Jikki	Vedha	
1956	Marumalarchi	Naanum Oru Manithanaa	A. M. Rajah	Pendyala Nageswara Rao	M. S. Subramaniam
1956	Marumalarchi	Vaadhithadhu Undhan Thavaruthaanaa		Pendyala Nageswara Rao	M. S. Subramaniam
1956	Mathar Kula Manickam	Anbe Enthan Vaazhvil	Ghantasala	S. Rajeswara Rao	Thanjai N. Ramaiah Dass
1956	Mathar Kula Manickam	Yennintha Jaalamada		S. Rajeswara Rao	Thanjai N. Ramaiah Dass
1956	Mathar Kula Manickam	Sri Lalitha Dhayabhariyae		S. Rajeswara Rao	Thanjai N. Ramaiah Dass
1956	Moondru Pengal	Vanakkam Saar Vanakkam	T. A. Mothi	K. V. Mahadevan	
1956	Naane Raja	Aadar Kalaikkazhagu Sera Pirandhaval	N. L. Ganasaraswathi	T. R. Ramanathan	Bharathidasan
1956	Naane Raja	Sindhu Paadum Thendral Vandhu	V. N. Sundaram	T. R. Ramanathan	Kuyilan
1956	Naane Raja	Malai Mudi Thediye .. Andhi Vanam Meedhile		T. R. Ramanathan	Kuyilan
1956	Naane Raja	Thunbam Yaavum Vaazhvile		T. R. Ramanathan	Kuyilan
1956	Nannambikkai	Meenai Pole Kannale	T. M. Soundararajan	S. V. Venkatraman	Kavi Lakshmanadas
1956	Pennin Perumai	Idhaya Vaanil Oliyai Veesum Vennilaave		Bhimavarapu Narasimha Rao & A. Rama Rao	Thanjai N. Ramaiah Dass
1956	Pennin Perumai	Koovudhu Koovudhu Seval Koovudhu	Jikki	Bhimavarapu Narasimha Rao & A. Rama Rao	Thanjai N. Ramaiah Dass
1956	Pennin Perumai	Kanden Kanavile En Paangiye		Bhimavarapu Narasimha Rao & A. Rama Rao	Thanjai N. Ramaiah Dass
1956	Pennin Perumai	Vaazhkai Odam Karai Serum Munne		Bhimavarapu Narasimha Rao & A. Rama Rao	Thanjai N. Ramaiah Dass
1956	Prema Pasam	Jegamengum Aavanith Thirunaal		S. Rajeswara Rao	Thanjai N. Ramaiah Dass
1956	Prema Pasam	Anaitthaalum Neeye Aditthaalum Neeye	P. B. Sreenivas	S. Rajeswara Rao	Thanjai N. Ramaiah Dass
1956	Prema Pasam	Indha Pedhaiyin Naal		S. Rajeswara Rao	Thanjai N. Ramaiah Dass
1956	Prema Pasam	Kala Maayamayena		S. Rajeswara Rao	Thanjai N. Ramaiah Dass
1956	Prema Pasam	Muralidharaa Hare Mohanakrishnaa		S. Rajeswara Rao	Thanjai N. Ramaiah Dass
1956	Prema Pasam	Oho Vennilaave Vinnaalum Vennilaave	Ghantasala	S. Rajeswara Rao	Thanjai N. Ramaiah Dass
1956	Prema Pasam	Oho Vennilaave Vinnaalum Vennilaave		S. Rajeswara Rao	Thanjai N. Ramaiah Dass
1956	Punniyavathi	Kannum Moodi Uranguga Nee En	Thiruchi Loganathan	V. Dakshinamoorthy	
1956	Rambaiyin Kaadhal	Kalaignanam Uravaadum Naadu	N. L. Ganasaraswathi	T. R. Pappa	A. Maruthakasi
1956	Rambaiyin Kaadhal	Kattumasthu Kalaiyaadha Kattazhagi.... Katthiri Saadham		T. R. Pappa	Thanjai N. Ramaiah Dass
1956	Tenali Raman	Ulagellaam Unatharulaal Malarum		Viswanathan–Ramamoorthy	M. K. Athamanathan
1956	Tenali Raman	Ulagellaam Unatharulaal Malarum (pathos)		Viswanathan–Ramamoorthy	M. K. Athamanathan
1956	Tenali Raman	Aadum Kalaiyellam Paruva Mangaiyar		Viswanathan–Ramamoorthy	Kannadasan
1956	Vetri Veeran	O Endhan Prema	T. M. Soundararajan	T. M. Ibrahim	Ku .Sa.Krishnamurthi
1957	Aandi Petra Selvam	Vaarungal Vaarungal		T. Chalapathi Rao	Puratchidasan
1957	Anbe Deivam	Atthaanai Engeyum Parrtheengalaa	Seerkazhi Govindarajan	H. R. Pathmanabha Sastry & Vijaya Bhaskar	Sundarakannan
1957	Baagyavathi	Asai Kiliye Azhagu Chilaiye		S. Dakshinamurthi	A. Maruthakasi
1957	Bhaktha Markandeya	Om Namaschivaaya	V. Nagayya	Viswanathan–Ramamoorthy	A. Maruthakasi
1957	Bhaktha Markandeya	Thirumaalum Brammanum	V. Nagayya	Viswanathan–Ramamoorthy	A. Maruthakasi
1957	Bhaktha Markandeya	Saaindhaadammaaa Saindhaadu		Viswanathan–Ramamoorthy	A. Maruthakasi
1957	Chakravarthi Thirumagal	Aada Vaanga Annaatthe	Seerkazhi Govindarajan & Jikki	G. Ramanathan	Ku. Ma. Balasubramaniam
1957	Chakravarthi Thirumagal	Ellai Illadha Inbatthile	Seerkazhi Govindarajan	G. Ramanathan	Ku. Ma. Balasubramaniam
1957	Chakravarthi Thirumagal	Sollaale Vilakka Mudiyale	S. Varalakshmi	G. Ramanathan	Ku. Sa. Krishnamoorthy
1957	Chakravarthi Thirumagal	Ennam Ellaam Inba Kadhai		G. Ramanathan	Ku. Sa. Krishnamoorthy
1957	Iru Sagodharigal	Thaaye Un Seyalallavo	M. L. Vasanthakumari	S. Rajeswara Rao	Thanjai N. Ramaiah Dass
1957	Iru Sagodharigal	Ini Manam Pola Naame	Ghantasala	S. Rajeswara Rao	Thanjai N. Ramaiah Dass
1957	Karpukkarasi	Vizhiyodu Vilayaadum	M. L. Vasanthakumari	G. Ramanathan	A. Maruthakasi
1957	Karpukkarasi	Thatthkaa Putthakaa Naalu Kaalu	Seerkazhi Govindarajan	G. Ramanathan	
1957	Manaalane Mangaiyin Baakkiyam	Mogamadaa Thaalaadha Modamadaa	M. S. Rama Rao	P. Adinarayana Rao	Thanjai N. Ramaiah Dass
1957	Manaalane Mangaiyin Baakkiyam	Mannaadhi Mannarum Kannaale		P. Adinarayana Rao	Thanjai N. Ramaiah Dass
1957	Manaalane Mangaiyin Baakkiyam	Utthana Thom Thom Thanaa	A. P. Komala	P. Adinarayana Rao	Thanjai N. Ramaiah Dass
1957	Manamagan Thevai	Poovaamal Kaayaadhu.... Kaadhal Kalyaaname		G. Ramanathan	
1957	Maya Bajaar	Patatupaadum Kuiliname		S. Rajeswara Rao & Ghantasala	Thanjai N. Ramaiah Dass
1957	Maya Bajaar	Aaha Inba Nilavinile	Ghantasala	S. Rajeswara Rao & Ghantasala	Thanjai N. Ramaiah Dass
1957	Maya Bajaar	Neethana Ennai	Ghantasala	S. Rajeswara Rao & Ghantasala	Thanjai N. Ramaiah Dass
1957	Maya Bajaar	Kannudan Kalandhidum Subadhiname	Ghantasala	S. Rajeswara Rao & Ghantasala	Thanjai N. Ramaiah Dass
1957	Maya Bajaar	Unakkagave Naan Uyir Vaazhvene	Ghantasala	S. Rajeswara Rao & Ghantasala	Thanjai N. Ramaiah Dass
1957	Maya Bajaar	Kelaayo Yashodamma	P. Susheela	S. Rajeswara Rao & Ghantasala	Thanjai N. Ramaiah Dass
1957	Pakka Thirudan	Maasilaa Gaana Lola		T. M. Ibrahim	Ku. Ma. Balasubramaniam
1957	Pakka Thirudan	Oho Rani, Oho Raja	Seerkazhi Govindarajan	T. M. Ibrahim	Kuyilan
1957	Pakka Thirudan	Penne Vaa Chinna Raani	Seerkazhi Govindarajan	T. M. Ibrahim	Kuyilan
1957	Pakka Thirudan	Aasaiye Maarumaa	Seerkazhi Govindarajan	T. M. Ibrahim	Kuyilan
1957	Pathini Deivam	Gnaanakkanna Ezhundhiru	T. M. Soundararajan	Viswanathan–Ramamoorthy	Thanjai N. Ramaiah Dass
1957	Pathini Deivam	Vaaraai Indre Mohana		Viswanathan–Ramamoorthy	Thanjai N. Ramaiah Dass
1957	Pathini Deivam	Chinna Chinna Vayasile		Viswanathan–Ramamoorthy	Thanjai N. Ramaiah Dass
1957	Pudhumai Pithan	Manamohanaa		G. Ramanathan	Thanjai N. Ramaiah Dass
1957	Pudhu Vazhvu	Devi En Kanavum Nanavaaguma		G. Ramanathan & C. N. Pandurangan	
1957	Pudhu Vazhvu	Maanai Pole Odi	M. K. Thyagaraja Bhagavathar	G. Ramanathan & C. N. Pandurangan	
1957	Raja Rajan	Aadum Azhage Azhagu	Soolamangalam Rajalakshmi	K. V. Mahadevan	Pukazhenthi
1957	Rani Lalithangi	Sri Saraswathi Dhevimaathaa	D. B. Ramachandra	G. Ramanathan	Thanjai N. Ramaiah Dass
1957	Rani Lalithangi	Aadunga Paadunga Odureenga	A. G. Rathnamala	G. Ramanathan	Thanjai N. Ramaiah Dass
1957	Rani Lalithangi	Kal Endraalum Kanavanaa		G. Ramanathan	Thanjai N. Ramaiah Dass
1957	Soubhagyavathi	Sagalamum Neeyae.... Oh Maadhaa		Pendyala Nageswara Rao & M. S. Gnanamani	Pattukottai Kalyanasundaram
1957	Soubhagyavathi	Ullum Puramum		Pendyala Nageswara Rao & M. S. Gnanamani	
1957	Thangamalai Ragasiyam	Iga Logame Inidhaagume	T. M. Soundararajan	T. G. Lingappa	Ku. Ma. Balasubramaniam
1957	Thangamalai Ragasiyam	Kalyaanam Nam Kalyaanam	T. M. Soundararajan	T. G. Lingappa	Ku. Ma. Balasubramaniam
1957	Thangamalai Ragasiyam	Vaa Vaa Vaa Odi Vaa	K. Rani	T. G. Lingappa	Ku. Sa. Krishnamoorthy
1957	Vanangamudi	Kattazhagu Maamaa		G. Ramanathan	Thanjai N. Ramaiah Dass
1958	Aalai Kandu Mayangathe	Anbe En Mei Kaadhal		S. M. Subbaiah Naidu	Thanjai N. Ramaiah Dass
1958	Anbu Engey	Amirtha Yogam Velli Kizhamai	T. M. Soundararajan	Vedha	V. Seetharaman
1958	Annaiyin Aanai	Neeyegadhi Eeswari		S. M. Subbaiah Naidu	A. Maruthakasi
1958	Annaiyin Aanai	Vaanga Vaanga Maappile	P. Susheela	S. M. Subbaiah Naidu	A. Maruthakasi
1958	Kadan Vaangi Kalyaanam	Kaiyum Kaiyum Kalandhuidavaa	A. M. Rajah	S. Rajeswara Rao	Thanjai N. Ramaiah Dass
1958	Kadan Vaangi Kalyaanam	Engirundhu Veesudho	A. M. Rajah	S. Rajeswara Rao	Thanjai N. Ramaiah Dass
1958	Kadan Vaangi Kalyaanam	Raama Raama Saranam		S. Rajeswara Rao	Thanjai N. Ramaiah Dass
1958	Kadan Vaangi Kalyaanam	Sundaraangiyai Paartthadhinaale	A. M. Rajah & Seerkazhi Govindarajan	S. Rajeswara Rao	Thanjai N. Ramaiah Dass
1958	Kadan Vaangi Kalyaanam	Madhu Vendum.... Kalamilaadha Kaalatthile	P. Susheela	S. Rajeswara Rao	Thanjai N. Ramaiah Dass
1958	Kadan Vaangi Kalyaanam	Aanandham Paramaanandham	A. M. Rajah	S. Rajeswara Rao	Thanjai N. Ramaiah Dass
1958	Kadan Vaangi Kalyaanam	Than Manadhai Nalanukku	A. M. Rajah & Seerkazhi Govindarajan	S. Rajeswara Rao	Thanjai N. Ramaiah Dass
1958	Kanniyin Sabatham	Pattaachi Kai		T. G. Lingappa	Kannadasan
1958	Kanniyin Sabatham	Naadalum Raajaa Neeye		T. G. Lingappa	A. Maruthakasi
1958	Kathavarayan	Jaadhi Illai Madha Bedham Illaiye	T. M. Soundararajan	G. Ramanathan	Thanjai N. Ramaiah Dass
1958	Kathavarayan	Nithirai Illaiyadi Sagiye		G. Ramanathan	Thanjai N. Ramaiah Dass
1958	Kudumba Gouravam	Kaalai Malarndhathadi Kanne		Viswanathan–Ramamoorthy	A. Maruthakasi
1958	Kudumba Gouravam	Engengu Ponaalum		Viswanathan–Ramamoorthy	A. Maruthakasi
1958	Manamalai	Nadanam Aadinaar	Radha Jayalakshmi	Vedha	Gopalakrishna Bharati
1958	Mangalya Bhagyam	Kanne Sella Thaaraa	S. C. Krishnan	G. Ramanathan	Udumalai Narayana Kavi
1958	Mangalya Bhagyam	Ennaanga Ungalaithaanga	Seerkazhi Govindarajan	G. Ramanathan	Udumalai Narayana Kavi
1958	Mangalya Bhagyam	Nenjathile Achcham	M. L. Vasanthakumari	G. Ramanathan	Kannadasan
1958	Naan Valartha Thangai	Amma Thulasi, Unmaiyin Arasi		Pendyala Nageswara Rao	Pattukkottai Kalyanasundaram
1958	Peria Koil	Kanne Kamalappoo		K. V. Mahadevan	A. Maruthakasi
1958	Petra Maganai Vitra Annai	Kaalamenum Kaattaaru	T. M. Soundararajan	Viswanathan–Ramamoorthy	S. D. Sundharam
1958	Thai Pirandhal Vazhi Pirakkum	Thai Pirandhal Vazhi Pirakkum	T. M. Soundararajan, S. V. Ponnusamy & L. R. Eswari	K. V. Mahadevan	A. Maruthakasi
1958	Thedi Vandha Selvam	Ragasiyathilum Ragasiyam		T. G. Lingappa	M. K. Athmanathan
1958	Thirumanam	Thirumanam ... Naalum Paathaachu	Jikki & A. P. Komala	S. M. Subbaiah Naidu & T. G. Lingappa	Kannadasan
1958	Thirumanam	Vaa, Oru Saedhi Sollave Odi Vaa	Seerkazhi Govindarajan	S. M. Subbaiah Naidu & T. G. Lingappa	Thanjai N. Ramaiah Dass
1958	Uthama Puthiran	Kaathiruppan Kamalakannan		G. Ramanathan	T. K. Sundhara Vathiyar
1958	Uthama Puthiran	Kondattam Manasukulle		G. Ramanathan	Thanjai N. Ramaiah Dass
1958	Uthama Puthiran	Pulli Vaikkiraan	Seerkazhi Govindarajan	G. Ramanathan	Ku. Ma. Balasubramaniam
1958	Vanjikottai Valiban	Kannum Kannum Kalanthu	Jikki	C. Ramchandra	Kothamangalam Subbu
1958	Vanjikottai Valiban	Raja Magal		C. Ramchandra	Kothamangalam Subbu
1958	Vanjikottai Valiban	Vennilave Vennilave		C. Ramchandra	Kothamangalam Subbu
1959	Abalai Anjugam	Keezhe Bhoomi, Maele Vaanam	S. C. Krishnan & A. L. Raghavan	K. V. Mahadevan	Udumalai Narayana Kavi
1959	Abalai Anjugam	Daaladikkum Paappaa Jaaliyaaga		K. V. Mahadevan	Thanjai N. Ramaiah Dass
1959	Amudhavalli	Singaara Vadivamaana Thithikkum	Seerkazhi Govindarajan	Viswanathan–Ramamoorthy	Udumalai Narayana Kavi
1959	Amudhavalli	Anbum Amaidhiyum	T. R. Mahalingam	Viswanathan–Ramamoorthy	Thanjai N. Ramaiah Dass
1959	Annaiyum Pidhavum Munnari Deivam	Kanavera Muni Raja		T. V. Raju	Kuyilan
1959	Annaiyum Pidhavum Munnari Deivam	Penngalai Kandadhum Sadhaa	Ghantasala	T. V. Raju	Kuyilan
1959	Arumai Magal Abirami	Theyn Thoyndha Sollile		V. Dakshinamoorthy	Kavi Lakshmanadas
1959	Aval Yaar	Enna Aanandam		S. Rajeswara Rao	Papanasam Sivan
1959	Aval Yaar	Kanne En Kanmaniye		S. Rajeswara Rao	Papanasam Sivan
1959	Bhaaga Pirivinai	Aanai Mugatthone.... Pillaiyaaru Koyilukku	T. M. Soundararajan	Viswanathan–Ramamoorthy	Pattukkottai Kalyanasundaram
1959	Bhaaga Pirivinai	Paalootri Uzhavu.... Therodum Indha Seeraana	T. M. Soundararajan	Viswanathan–Ramamoorthy	Kannadasan
1959	Bhaaga Pirivinai	Thalaiyaam Poo Mudichu	T. M. Soundararajan	Viswanathan–Ramamoorthy	Kannadasan
1959	Deivame Thunai	Sonnaal Thaan Theriyumaa		S. M. Subbaiah Naidu	Velavan
1959	Deivame Thunai	Chinnakutti Nadaiyai Paaru		S. M. Subbaiah Naidu	A. Maruthakasi
1960	Petraval Kanda Peruvazhvu	Anbe Vaadaa		Br Lakshmanan	Ku. Ma. Balasubramaniam
1960	Petraval Kanda Peruvazhvu	Kalakalavendru Mazhalaigal		Br Lakshmanan	Ku. Ma. Balasubramaniam
1959	Kalyanikku Kalyanam	Thai Porandha Vazhi Porakum	T. M. Soundararajan, V. T. Rajagopalan, A. P. Komala, A. G. Rathnamala, K. Jamuna Rani & Kamala	G. Ramanathan	Pattukkottai Kalyanasundaram
1959	Kalyanikku Kalyanam	Aanandam Inru Aarambam	M. L. Vasanthakumari	G. Ramanathan	Pattukkottai Kalyanasundaram
1959	Kalyanikku Kalyanam	Kuttukalai Sollanumaa	T. M. Soundararajan, K. Jamuna Rani & Kamala	G. Ramanathan	Pattukkottai Kalyanasundaram
1959	Kalyanikku Kalyanam	Varushathile Oru Naalu Deepavali	T. M. Soundararajan & A. P. Komala	G. Ramanathan	Pattukkottai Kalyanasundaram
1959	Manimekalai	Inge Vaa Sorgam Paar	K. Abhayam	G. Ramanathan	Kambadasan
1959	Manimekalai	Varuga Varuga Sugumaaraa	Radha Jayalakshmi & A. P. Komala	G. Ramanathan	A. Maruthakasi
1959	Maragatham	Pachchai Kili Pola	K. Jamuna Rani	S. M. Subbaiah Naidu	
1959	Minnal Veeran	Manamirunthaal Maargamundu	M. L. Vasanthakumari	Vedha	A. Maruthakasi
1959	Naan Sollum Ragasiyam	Parkkaadha Pudhumaigal		G. Ramanathan	A. Maruthakasi
1959	Nalla Theerpu	Azhagaana Maaran Yaaradi		S. M. Subbaiah Naidu	Ku. Ma. Balasubramaniam
1959	Orey Vazhi	Kalvi Kalvi Endru Paadu	M. L. Vasanthakumari	R. Govardhanam	Kannadasan
1959	Orey Vazhi	Vettunda Kaiyum Veezhndhu		R. Govardhanam	Kannadasan
1959	Pandithevan	Vambu Mozhi Maari Maari		C. N. Pandurangan & Meenakshi Subramanyam	Pattukkottai Kalyanasundaram
1959	Paththarai Maathu Thangam	Sirithu Pesi Otrumaiyaai	A. P. Komala	G. Govindarajulu Naidu & Tiruvenkadu Selvarathinam	Thamizh Azhagan
1959	Pennkulathin Ponvilakku	Kadavul Padaikkavillai	M. L. Vasanthakumari	Master Venu	Villiputhan
1959	Pennkulathin Ponvilakku	Patta Kaalile Padum		Master Venu	Muhavai Rajamanickam
1959	Pennkulathin Ponvilakku	Ambigai Nee Gathiye Thaye		Master Venu	Muhavai Rajamanickam
1959	President Panchatcharam	Dhesa Sudhanthiram Thedi Vazhangiya	Soolamangalam Rajalakshmi	G. Ramanathan	Ku. Ma. Balasubramaniam
1959	Raja Sevai	Konjum Kanne Kumaaraa		T. V. Raju	Thanjai N. Ramaiah Dass
1959	Raja Sevai	Kannaana Kanmaniye		T. V. Raju	Thanjai N. Ramaiah Dass
1959	Sabash Ramu	Dhevaa Unaip Paniven		T. M. Ibrahim	Ku. Sa. Krishnamoorthi
1959	Sivagangai Seemai	Saanthu Pottu Thala Thalanga	K. Jamuna Rani	Viswanathan–Ramamoorthy	Kannadasan
1959	Sivagangai Seemai	Kannankaruthaa Kili		Viswanathan–Ramamoorthy	Kannadasan
1959	Sivagangai Seemai	Vaigai Perugivara	C. S. Jayaraman	Viswanathan–Ramamoorthy	Kannadasan
1959	Sumangali	Kaadhal Thandha Jothi	P. B. Sreenivas	M. Ranga Rao	En Thangai Natarajan
1959	Thamarai Kulam			H. Padmanabha Sarma & T. A. Mothi	
1959	Thanga Padhumai	Engal Kula Nayagiye		Viswanathan–Ramamoorthy	Kannadasan
1959	Thanga Padhumai	Pariththa Kannaipadhitthu		Viswanathan–Ramamoorthy	Pattukkottai Kalyanasundaram
1959	Thanga Padhumai	Mugatthil Mugam Parkkalam	T. M. Soundararajan	Viswanathan–Ramamoorthy	Pattukkottai Kalyanasundaram
1959	Thanga Padhumai	Kotravan Madhurai Moodhor		Viswanathan–Ramamoorthy	Pattukkottai Kalyanasundaram
1959	Uzhavukkum Thozhilukkum Vandhanai Seivom	Maaname Peridhenre		K. V. Mahadevan	A. Maruthakasi
1955	Vaazhkai Oppandham	Brandhaavana Vennilaave	Ghantasala	Ghantasala	Thanjai N. Ramaiah Dass
1955	Vaazhkai Oppandham	Neethaane Logamum	Ghantasala	Ghantasala	Thanjai N. Ramaiah Dass
1955	Vaazhkai Oppandham	Idhaya Vaanil Udhaymaana	Ghantasala	Ghantasala	Thanjai N. Ramaiah Dass
1955	Vaazhkai Oppandham	Jeyame Nee Arul		Ghantasala	Thanjai N. Ramaiah Dass
1955	Vaazhkai Oppandham	Aaraaro Aaraaro		Ghantasala	Thanjai N. Ramaiah Dass
1959	Yaanai Valartha Vanampadi	Kaanagame Engal Thaayagame		Br Lakshmanan	Kanaka Surabhi
1959	Yaanai Valartha Vanampadi	Pann Paadi Varum Odai Neeril	A. M. Rajah	Br Lakshmanan	Kanaka Surabhi

=== 1960s ===
Year	Movie/Album	Song	Co-singers	Music Director	Lyricist
1960	Aadavantha Deivam	Kodi Kodi Inbam	P. Susheela	K. V. Mahadevan	A. Maruthakasi
1960	Aalukkoru Veedu	Nee Kettadhu Inbam		Viswanathan–Ramamoorthy	Pattukkottai Kalyanasundaram
1960	Bala Nagamma	Jaya Jaya Girijaa Ramanaa		T. V. Raju	
1960	Bala Nagamma	Thaale Laale En Premai		T. V. Raju	
1960	Bala Nagamma	Thaalo Thaalo Oonjale	K. Rani	T. V. Raju	
1960	Chavukkadi Chandrakantha	Aadchiyum Soozhchchiyum Sernthaal	A. G. Rathnamala	G. Ramanathan	
1960	Chavukkadi Chandrakantha	Malarvana Veedhiyile Vasantha Thaerile		G. Ramanathan	
1960	Engal Selvi	Enna Peru Vaikkalaam	K. Jamuna Rani & L. R. Eswari	K. V. Mahadevan	Kannadasan
1960	Engal Selvi	Sila Sila Aandugal Munnam		K. V. Mahadevan	Kuyilan
1960	Irumbu Thirai	Nenjil Kudiyirukkum	T. M. Soundararajan	K. V. Mahadevan	Pattukkottai Kalyanasundaram
1960	Irumbu Thirai	Aasai Konda Nenju Rendu		K. V. Mahadevan	Pattukkottai Kalyanasundaram
1960	Irumbu Thirai	Padipirkum Oru Kumbidu	Jikki	K. V. Mahadevan	Kothamangalam Subbu
1960	Ivan Avanethan	Dhevi Jagan Maadhaa	P. B. Sreenivas	M. Ranga Rao	Thanjai N. Ramaiah Dass
1960	Kuravanji	Sengkayal Vandu	C. S. Jayaraman, A. P. Komala, A. G. Rathnamala & Ramaiya	T. R. Pappa	Thirikooda Rasappa Kavirayar
1960	Kuravanji	Thanneril Meen Irukum.... Unakku Puriyudhu	C. S. Jayaraman	T. R. Pappa	Kannadasan
1960	Kuravanji	Kaadhal Kadal Karaiyorame	C. S. Jayaraman & P. Susheela	T. R. Pappa	Kannadasan
1960	Mahalakshmi	Vael Velluma En Vizhi		K. V. Mahadevan	Pattukkottai Kalyanasundaram
1960	Mannathi Mannan	Kaaduthazhaikka.... Kanniyar Perumai	S. C. Krishnan	Viswanathan–Ramamoorthy	Kannadasan
1960	Naan Kanda Sorgam	Ilamai Maaraadha Inbam	N. L. Ganasaraswathi	G. Aswathama	
1960	Pattaliyin Vetri	Gama Gama Gamangkudhu	Seerkazhi Govindarajan	S. Rajeswara Rao & Master Venu	Udumalai Narayana Kavi
1960	Padikkadha Medhai	Aadi Pizhaithaalum Paadi Pizhaithaalum		K. V. Mahadevan	A. Maruthakasi
1960	Padikkadha Medhai	Vindhaiyinum Periya Vindhaiyadi		K. V. Mahadevan	A. Maruthakasi
1960	Patti Vikramathithan	Madhanaa En Premai	A. P. Komala	Pendyala Nageshwara Rao	
1960	Raja Desingu	Kanangkuruvi Kaattuppuraa	Seerkazhi Govindarajan	G. Ramanathan	
1960	Raja Desingu	Mannavane Senji	Seerkazhi Govindarajan	G. Ramanathan	
1960	Raja Desingu	Podapporaaru		G. Ramanathan	
1960	Raja Desingu	Vaazhga Engal	Jikki	G. Ramanathan	
1960	Raja Desingu	Pazhanimalai		G. Ramanathan	
1960	Raja Desingu	Vandhaan Paaru	Seerkazhi Govindarajan	G. Ramanathan	
1960	Raja Makudam	Maadapurave Odi Varuvaaya		Master Venu	
1960	Raja Makudam	Konji Varum Thendrale		Master Venu	
1960	Raja Makudam	Ambaa Jagadhaamba		Master Venu	
1960	Raja Makudam	Iravinil Vandhadheno.... Ooredhu Peredhu O Vennilaave	Seerkazhi Govindarajan	Master Venu	
1960	Rathinapuri Ilavarasi	Maanthoppu Veeddukkaari		Viswanathan–Ramamoorthy	Pattukkottai Kalyanasundaram
1960	Sangilithevan	Sattaiyile Theychukalaam	Thiruchi Loganathan	T. G. Lingappa	Pattukkottai Kalyanasundaram
1960	Sangilithevan	Kaadhal Ullam Kavarndha	T. M. Soundararajan	T. G. Lingappa	Ku. Ma. Balasubramaniam
1960	Sangilithevan	Thillai Nagar Thanile	T. M. Soundararajan	T. G. Lingappa	K. S. Gopalakrishnan
1960	Sangilithevan	Thendral Urangida Koodumadi	T. M. Soundararajan	T. G. Lingappa	Kannadasan
1960	Uthami Petra Rathinam	Poovintri Manamedhu	T. M. Soundararajan	T. Chalapathi Rao	A. Maruthakasi
1960	Yanai Paagan	Paadupatta Thozhilaali Pasikudhendraan		K. V. Mahadevan	Puratchidasan
1961	Arasilangkumari	Atthaane Aasai Atthaane		G. Ramanathan	K. S. Gopalakrishnan
1961	Anbu Magan	Paal Koduththa Thanangal Sollum		T. Chalapathi Rao	Kannadasan
1961	Jagathala Prathapan	Aadhilatchumi Vandhaai Atthaiyaaga	P. Susheela	Pendyala Nageswara Rao	Panchu Arunachalam
1961	Jagathala Prathapan	Irudhayam Kallaa Thayai		Pendyala Nageswara Rao	Panchu Arunachalam
1961	Jagathala Prathapan	Jalamthanil Aadukirom	P. Susheela	Pendyala Nageswara Rao	Panchu Arunachalam
1961	Jagathala Prathapan	Jeyathiru Jegathala Raajaa	P. Susheela	Pendyala Nageswara Rao	Panchu Arunachalam
1961	Jagathala Prathapan	Vanatthil Odiya	P. Susheela	Pendyala Nageswara Rao	Kannadasan
1961	Kappalottiya Thamizhan	Endru Thaniyum Indha		G. Ramanathan	Mahakavi Subramania Bharati
1961	Kumara Raja	Yettil Padithathodu Irundhuvidaathe		T. R. Pappa	Pattukkottai Kalyanasundaram
1961	Kumara Raja	Naan Vandhu Serndha Idam Nalla Idam		T. R. Pappa	Pattukkottai Kalyanasundaram
1961	Kumara Raja	Aanundu Paada, Pennundu Aada	J. P. Chandrababu	T. R. Pappa	K. D. Santhanam
1961	Malliyam Mangalam	Maname Nilai Maaruvathen		T. A. Kalyanam	Kuyilan
1961	Naaga Nandhini	Mana Oonjalile Aadum Mannaa		R. Sudarsanam	Thanjai N. Ramaiah Dass
1961	Nallavan Vazhvan	Anbukkaratthale....Kuthaala Aruviyile	Seerkazhi Govindarajan	T. R. Pappa	Vaali
1961	Nallavan Vazhvan	Nallavarukke Kaalamillaiyaa		T. R. Pappa	K. D. Santhanam
1961	Yar Manamagan?	Kadalamma Kadalamma	Thiruchi Loganathan & Renuka	Br Lakshmanan	Sundarakannan
1961	Yar Manamagan?	Manasuketha Manmadhan Varuvaaru	Renuka	Br Lakshmanan	Ku. Ma. Balasubramaniam
1961	Yar Manamagan?	Aanazhage Vaanamudhe	A. M. Rajah	Br Lakshmanan	Ku. Ma. Balasubramaniam
1961	Yar Manamagan?	Kaadhalenum Veenaithanai Geetham Paada	A. M. Rajah	Br Lakshmanan	Ku. Ma. Balasubramaniam
1961	Sabarimala Ayyappan			S. M. Subbaiah Naidu	
1962	Ethaiyum Thangum Ithaiyam	Kaniyirukku Virundu Vaikka		T. R. Pappa	Pattukkottai Kalyanasundaram
1962	Konjum Salangai	Konjum Salangai Oli		S. M. Subbaiah Naidu	Kannadasan
1962	Mahaveera Bheeman	Needhikku Kannillai Enre		M. S. Gnanamani	Solairasu
1962	Mahaveera Bheeman	Engengum Niraindhirukkum		M. S. Gnanamani	Solairasu
1962	Mahaveera Bheeman	Enadhullam Magizhnthaadudhe		M. S. Gnanamani	Solairasu
1962	Manithan Maravillai	Podu Podu Thekka Podu	Seerkazhi Govindarajan, Ghantasala & P. Susheela	Ghantasala	Thanjai N. Ramaiah Dass
1962	Manithan Maravillai	Kaalathai Maatrinaan	Seerkazhi Govindarajan	Ghantasala	Kannadasan
1962	Pattinathar	Nilave Nee Intha	T. M. Soundararajan	G. Ramanathan	T. K. Sundara Vaathiyaar
1962	Rathna Manjari	Amudhame Kidaitthadhu		Rajan–Nagendra	Puratchi Dasan
1962	Rathna Manjari	Potruvom Vaazhi	P. B. Sreenivas	Rajan–Nagendra	Puratchi Dasan
1962	Rathna Manjari	Thunba Nedungkadalil		Rajan–Nagendra	Puratchi Dasan
1962	Senthamarai	Maargazhi Thingal Madhi Niraindha		Viswanathan–Ramamoorthy	Thiruppaavai
1962	Senthamarai	Vaaranam Aayiram Soozha Valam Seidhu	L. R. Eswari & L. R. Anjali	Viswanathan–Ramamoorthy	Thiruppaavai
1962	Senthamarai	Ponnedutthu Seidhu Vaiththa	L. R. Eswari & L. R. Anjali	Viswanathan–Ramamoorthy	Kannadasan
1962	Veerathirumagan	Ontodu Ondrai Vaitthaan	T. M. Soundararajan & M. S. Viswanathan	Viswanathan–Ramamoorthy	Kannadasan
1962	Vikramaadhithan	Nilaiyaana Kalai Vaazghave	T. V. Rathnam	S. Rajeswara Rao	Saravanabhavanandhar
1962	Vikramaadhithan	Mugatthai Paarthu Muraikkaatheenga	T. M. Soundararajan	S. Rajeswara Rao	Pattukkottai Kalyanasundaram
1963	Arivaali	Vaazhiya Needoozhi	Radha Jayalakshmi	S. V. Venkatraman	A. Maruthakasi
1963	Aayiram Kalathu Payir	Vattamitta Pottazhagan Kattazhagan		S. M. Subbaiah Naidu	Chidambaram Sundaram Pillai
1963	Kalai Arasi	Endrum Illaamal		K. V. Mahadevan	Pattukkottai Kalyanasundaram
1963	Kubera Theevu	Navasakthiye Gnaanasakthiye		C. N. Pandurangan	Kambadasan
1963	Lava Kusa	Thiruvalar Naayagan Sree Raamane	Ghantasala, P. Susheela & K. Rani	K. V. Mahadevan & Ghantasala	A. Maruthakasi
1963	Lava Kusa	Jagam Pugazhum Punniya Kadhai 1	P. Susheela	K. V. Mahadevan & Ghantasala	A. Maruthakasi
1963	Lava Kusa	Jagam Pugazhum Punniya Kadhai 2	P. Susheela	K. V. Mahadevan & Ghantasala	A. Maruthakasi
1963	Lava Kusa	Jagam Pugazhum Punniya Kadhai 3	P. Susheela	K. V. Mahadevan & Ghantasala	A. Maruthakasi
1963	Lava Kusa	Maari Pol Kanneer Sindha	P. Susheela	K. V. Mahadevan & Ghantasala	A. Maruthakasi
1963	Lava Kusa	Sreeraghavam Dasharathathmajam Aprameyam	P. Susheela	K. V. Mahadevan & Ghantasala	A. Maruthakasi
1963	Lava Kusa	Raama Suguna Seelaa	P. Susheela	K. V. Mahadevan & Ghantasala	A. Maruthakasi
1963	Lava Kusa	Eedu Inai Namakku Edhu	P. Susheela	K. V. Mahadevan & Ghantasala	A. Maruthakasi
1963	Lava Kusa	Stree Balavrudhula Tega	Ghantasala & P. Susheela	K. V. Mahadevan & Ghantasala	A. Maruthakasi
1963	Lava Kusa	Thandri Pampunanegi	Ghantasala & P. Susheela	K. V. Mahadevan & Ghantasala	A. Maruthakasi
1963	Lava Kusa	Takkani Balakundani		K. V. Mahadevan & Ghantasala	A. Maruthakasi
1963	Lava Kusa	Ninu Dattadriki Cherakunda		K. V. Mahadevan & Ghantasala	A. Maruthakasi
1963	Paar Magaley Paar	Vetkamaai Irukkudhadhi	Soolamangalam Rajalakshmi	Viswanathan–Ramamoorthy	Kannadasan
1963	Punithavathi	Thithikkum Kuralaale Thiruvalluvan		Hussein Reddy	Surabhi
1964	Nalvaravu	Penn Vaazhavendum Endraal		T. Chalapathi Rao	V. Lakshmanan
1964	Rishyasringar	Jaya Jaya Jaya Sri Narasimhaa	Jikki	T. V. Raju	
1964	Vazhi Piranthadu	Azhuvadhu Enammaa		K. V. Mahadevan	A. K. Velan
1964	Veeranganai	Malare Malare Mangai		Vedha	Kavi Rajagopal
1964	Veeranganai	Maaveeran Arjunanin.... Angamellaam Sorndhu	M. L. Vasanthakumari & K. J. Yesudas	Vedha	T. K. Sundara Kannan
1964	Veeranganai	Naadu Enum Paingiliyai		Vedha	Kavi Rajagopal
1964	Veeranganai	Thaaye Dhayaanithiye		Vedha	T. K. Sundara Vathiyar
1965	Pandava Vanavasam	Kannaa... Dheva Dheena		Ghantasala	Kuyilan
1965	Pandava Vanavasam	Maiyalaanen Mahaaraajane	L. R. Eswari	Ghantasala	Kuyilan
1966	Thayin Mel Aanai	Jivvunu Sevattha Machan	A. P. Komala	T. G. Lingappa	
1967	Pesum Dheivam	Idhaya Oonjal	T. M. Soundararajan & P. Susheela	K. V. Mahadevan	Vaali
1969	Captain Ranjan			G. Ramanathan	
1969	Kumara Sambhavam	Saravana Poigayil Avadhaaram		G. Devarajan	Kannadasan
1969	Iru Kodugal	Kavidhai Ezhudhiya	P. Susheela	V. Kumar	Vaali

=== 1970s ===
Year	Movie/Album	Song	Co-singers	Music Director	Lyricist
1970	Engirundho Vandhaal	Sakunthalai Dushyanthan	Seerkazhi Govindarajan	M. S. Viswanathan	Kannadasan
1972	Thiruneelakandar	Mugam Paarthathu Pothatha		C. N. Pandurangan	Kannadasan
1973	Malai Naattu Mangai	Vennilave Vennilave	S. V. Ponnusamy	Vedpaul Sharma	Kannadasan
1973	Malligai Poo	Muruganukku Mootthavane	Seerkazhi Govindarajan, K. Swarna, S. C. Krishnan & S. V. Ponnusamy	V. Kumar	Vaali
1975	Swami Ayyappan	Thanga Padhumai		G. Devarajan	Kannadasan

=== 1990s ===
Year	Movie/Album	Song	Co-singers	Music Director	Lyricist
1991	Karpoora Mullai	Sri Siva Sudha		Ilaiyaraaja	Ilaiyaraaja

== Kannada songs ==
=== 1950s ===
Year	Movie/Album	Song	Co-singers	Music Director	Lyricist
1955	Sodari	Hey Deva Girijaadhava		H. R. Padmanabha Shasthri	Hunsur Krishnamurthy
1955	Sodari	Belaguva Baa Gelathi		H. R. Padmanabha Shasthri	Hunsur Krishnamurthy
1955	Sodari	Aalisade Dayathorisade	A. M. Rajah	H. R. Padmanabha Shasthri	Hunsur Krishnamurthy
1955	Sodari	Alabeda Alabeda O Nanna Chinna		H. R. Padmanabha Shasthri	Hunsur Krishnamurthy
1955	Sodari	Samsaaravembude Manninda		H. R. Padmanabha Shasthri	Hunsur Krishnamurthy
1955	Sodari	Anathalaadenu Ee Jagadali		H. R. Padmanabha Shasthri	Hunsur Krishnamurthy
1956	Bhakta Vijaya	Nodai Dayadi Ranga		Shyam-Aathmanath	
1956	Bhakta Vijaya	Pathiseva Nija Sathige		Shyam-Aathmanath	
1956	Ohileshwara	Paavana Parashiva	C. S. Sarojini Devi	G. K. Venkatesh	
1957	Premada Putri	Thribhuvana Janani		T. G. Lingappa & H. R. Padmanabha Shastry	R. N. Jayagopal
1957	Premada Putri	Kanuve Manamohana		T. G. Lingappa & H. R. Padmanabha Shastry	R. N. Jayagopal
1957	Premada Putri	Baaramma Nidiraadevi		T. G. Lingappa & H. R. Padmanabha Shastry	R. N. Jayagopal
1957	Premada Putri	Aadi Paadi Odanaadi	Ghantasala	T. G. Lingappa & H. R. Padmanabha Shastry	Kanagal Prabhakara Shastry
1957	Rathnagiri Rahasya	Anuragadha Amaravathi	T. M. Soundararajan	T. G. Lingappa	Kanagal Prabhakara Shastry
1957	Rathnagiri Rahasya	Kalyana Namma	T. M. Soundararajan	T. G. Lingappa	Kanagal Prabhakara Shastry
1957	Rathnagiri Rahasya	Baa Baa Baa Odi Baa	K. Rani	T. G. Lingappa	Kanagal Prabhakara Shastry

=== 1960s ===
Year	Movie/Album	Song	Co-singers	Music Director	Lyricist
1961	Nagarjuna	Ninnavalu Naanendu Kaaye		Rajan–Nagendra	Hunsur Krishnamurthy
1962	Swarna Gowri	Laali Laali Bala Mukunda		M. Venkataraju	
1963	Nanda Deepa	Naadinanda Ee Deepavali	S. Janaki	M. Venkataraju	Sorat Ashwath
1963	Nanda Deepa	Nyayakke Kannilla		M. Venkataraju	Sorat Ashwath
1963	Saaku Magalu	Baa Bega Manamohana		T. G. Lingappa	Kanagal Prabhakara Shastry
1963	Santha Thukaram	Elayya Manamohana	L. R. Eswari	Vijaya Bhaskar	Chi. Sadashivaiah
1963	Sathi Shakthi	Aadi Paadi Odanaadi	Ghantasala	T. G. Lingappa	Kanagal Prabhakara Shastry
1963	Sathi Shakthi	Acha Mallige Hoovu		T. G. Lingappa	Kanagal Prabhakara Shastry
1963	Sathi Shakthi	Baa Thaaye Baa		T. G. Lingappa	Kanagal Prabhakara Shastry
1963	Sathi Shakthi	Huyyo Huyyo		T. G. Lingappa	Kanagal Prabhakara Shastry
1963	Sathi Shakthi	Pavadisu Phalaakshai		T. G. Lingappa	Kanagal Prabhakara Shastry
1963	Sathi Shakthi	Sri Mathe		T. G. Lingappa	Kanagal Prabhakara Shastry
1963	Veera Kesari	Dhundu Malli	Ghantasala	Ghantasala	Ashwath
1963	Veera Kesari	Ellaninagage	Ghantasala	Ghantasala	Ashwath
1963	Veera Kesari	Hareyukkide		Ghantasala	Ashwath
1964	Annapoorna	Anda Chendada Hoove	T. R. Jayadev	Rajan–Nagendra	Chi. Udayashankar
1964	Navakoti Narayana	Madhukara Vruththi	M. Balamuralikrishna & P. B. Sreenivas	Shivaprasad	
1964	Navakoti Narayana	Bangaravidabare	M. Balamuralikrishna	Shivaprasad	
1965	Satya Harishchandra	Hey Chandrachooda	Ghantasala	Pendyala Nageswara Rao	Hunsur Krishnamurthy
1965	Satya Harishchandra	Neenu Namage	P. Susheela	Pendyala Nageswara Rao	Hunsur Krishnamurthy
1965	Satya Harishchandra	Thillana	Pasumarthi Krishnamurthy	Pendyala Nageswara Rao	Hunsur Krishnamurthy
1965	Satya Harishchandra	Lakshmi Ksheerasamudra		Pendyala Nageswara Rao	Hunsur Krishnamurthy
1965	Satya Harishchandra	Sathyavadu Naashavaaguva		Pendyala Nageswara Rao	Hunsur Krishnamurthy
1965	Satya Harishchandra	Vidhi Vipareetha	Ghantasala	Pendyala Nageswara Rao	Hunsur Krishnamurthy
1965	Satya Harishchandra	Bhuviyalli Munigalu		Pendyala Nageswara Rao	Hunsur Krishnamurthy
1965	Satya Harishchandra	Deena Baandhava	Ghantasala	Pendyala Nageswara Rao	Hunsur Krishnamurthy
1966	Mantralaya Mahatme	Kavyarathi Mandirada Prathibanvitha	K. Veeramani	Rajan–Nagendra	G. V. Iyer
1967	Anuradha	Thooguve Rangana	P. B. Sreenivas	Rajan–Nagendra	Purandara Dasa
1967	Muddu Meena	Ammana Madilali		G. K. Venkatesh & Upendra Kumar	Ashwath
1968	Manku Dinne	Ammana Madilali		Vijaya Bhaskar	Ashwath
1968	Sarvamangala	Andha Chendada Hoove	T. R. Jayadev	Satyam	Chi. Udaya Shankar

=== 1970s ===
Year	Movie/Album	Song	Co-singers	Music Director	Lyricist
1972	Jaga Mecchida Maga	Kanasalli Nanasalli		Satyam	Hunsur Krishnamurthy
1974	Professor Huchuraya	Koodi Bandide Kankana	S. P. Balasubrahmanyam	Rajan–Nagendra	Nagendra Babu

== Telugu songs ==
=== 1940s ===
Year	Movie/Album	Song	Co-singers	Music Director	Lyricist
1949	Mana Desam			Ghantasala	Samudrala Sr.
1949	Gunasundari Katha	Kalpagama Tallivai Ghanata		Ogirala Ramachandra Rao	Pingali Nagendra Rao
1949	Gunasundari Katha	O Matha Raavaa Naa Mora Vinavaa		Ogirala Ramachandra Rao	Pingali Nagendra Rao
1949	Gunasundari Katha	Siri Thalam Vesenante	Kasturi Siva Rao	Ogirala Ramachandra Rao	Pingali Nagendra Rao
1949	Gunasundari Katha	Sri Thulasi Jaya Thulasi		Ogirala Ramachandra Rao	Pingali Nagendra Rao
1949	Gunasundari Katha	Upakaara Gunaalayavai Vunnavu		Ogirala Ramachandra Rao	Pingali Nagendra Rao
1949	Laila Majnu	Neevene Naa Chaduvu	Ghantasala, P. Bhanumathi & Jikki	C. R. Subburaman	Samudrala Sr.
1949	Laila Majnu	Andala Chinnadana	Jikki	C. R. Subburaman	Samudrala Sr.
1949	Laila Majnu	Eenaati Mapata	Jikki	C. R. Subburaman	Samudrala Sr.
1949	Laila Majnu	Ninugani Manasuna		C. R. Subburaman	Samudrala Sr.

=== 1950s ===
Year	Movie/Album	Song	Co-singers	Music Director	Lyricist
1950	Samsaram	Amma Sri Thulasi		S. Dakshinamurthi	Vempati Sadasivabrahmam
1950	Samsaram	Asha Ika Lene Ledemo		S. Dakshinamurthi	Kondamudi Gopala Raya Sarma
1950	Samsaram	Jo Jo Yedavaku		S. Dakshinamurthi	Vempati Sadasivabrahmam
1950	Samsaram	Itupai Naa Gatemileda		S. Dakshinamurthi	Kondamudi Gopala Raya Sarma
1950	Sri Lakshmamma Katha	Chinnari Bangaru		C. R. Subburaman	Balijepalli Lakshmikantam
1950	Sri Lakshmamma Katha	Gummadi Poola Kammani Gaali		C. R. Subburaman	Balijepalli Lakshmikantam
1950	Sri Lakshmamma Katha	Hayiga Veenula Vinduga	S. Dakshinamurthi	C. R. Subburaman	Balijepalli Lakshmikantam
1950	Sri Lakshmamma Katha	Idi Naa Vidhi Krutama		C. R. Subburaman	Balijepalli Lakshmikantam
1950	Sri Lakshmamma Katha	Jeevithame Vrudha Auno		C. R. Subburaman	Balijepalli Lakshmikantam
1950	Sri Lakshmamma Katha	Nattinta Maa Lakshmi		C. R. Subburaman	Balijepalli Lakshmikantam
1951	Pathala Bhairavi	Entha Ghatu Premayo	Ghantasala	Ghantasala	Pingali Nagendra Rao
1951	Pathala Bhairavi	Hayiga	Ghantasala	Ghantasala	Pingali Nagendra Rao
1951	Pathala Bhairavi	Kalavaramaye	Ghantasala	Ghantasala	Pingali Nagendra Rao
1951	Pathala Bhairavi	Theeyani Oohalu		Ghantasala	Pingali Nagendra Rao
1951	Stree Sahasam	Aalinchave		C. R. Subburaman	Samudrala Sr.
1952	Daasi	Maarajula	Pithapuram Nageswara Rao	C. R. Subburaman & S. Dakshinamurthi	Acharya Aatreya
1952	Daasi	Kalakallade Panduga	Jikki	C. R. Subburaman & S. Dakshinamurthi	Acharya Aatreya
1952	Daasi	Chitti Thalli Navvave		C. R. Subburaman & S. Dakshinamurthi	Acharya Aatreya
1952	Palletooru	Vacchinadoyi Sankranti	Ghantasala, B. Gopalam & Vakkalanka Sarala	Ghantasala	
1952	Palletooru	Raju Peda	Jikki	Ghantasala	
1952	Pelli Chesi Choodu	Yevaro Yevaro	Ghantasala	Ghantasala	Pingali Nagendrarao
1952	Pelli Chesi Choodu	Raadhanuraayedavaku	Ghantasala, G. Varalakshmi & Joga Rao	Ghantasala	Pingali Nagendrarao
1952	Pelli Chesi Choodu	Yekkadoyi Priya	Pithapuram Nageswara Rao	Ghantasala	Pingali Nagendrarao
1952	Pelli Chesi Choodu	Manasa Nenevaro Neeku Thelusa		Ghantasala	Pingali Nagendrarao
1952	Pelli Chesi Choodu	Yedukondalavada Venkataramana		Ghantasala	Pingali Nagendrarao
1953	Bratuku Teruvu	Raadooyi Kanaraadooyi	A. P. Komala	Ghantasala	Samudrala Sr.
1953	Bratuku Teruvu	Andame Aanandam		Ghantasala	Samudrala Sr.
1953	Bratuku Teruvu	Yedomattu Mandu Jalli		Ghantasala	Samudrala Sr.
1953	Paropakaram			Ghantasala	
1954	Chandraharam	Ye Saadhuvvlu		Ghantasala	Pingali Nagendra Rao
1954	Chandraharam	Krupa Ganavaa Naa		Ghantasala	Pingali Nagendra Rao
1954	Chandraharam	Daya Ganave Thalli		Ghantasala	Pingali Nagendra Rao
1954	Iddaru Pellalu	O Madana Raa	Ghantasala	T. R. Pappa, T. K. Kumara Swamy & T. A. Kalyanam	Kopalli Venkataramana Rao
1954	Iddaru Pellalu	Telesindi Nee Manasulona	Ghantasala	T. R. Pappa, T. K. Kumara Swamy & T. A. Kalyanam	Kopalli Venkataramana Rao
1954	Iddaru Pellalu	Tholiprema	Ghantasala	T. R. Pappa, T. K. Kumara Swamy & T. A. Kalyanam	Kopalli Venkataramana Rao
1954	Iddaru Pellalu	Nanu Chooda		T. R. Pappa, T. K. Kumara Swamy & T. A. Kalyanam	Kopalli Venkataramana Rao
1954	Iddaru Pellalu	Madilo Hai	Ghantasala	T. R. Pappa, T. K. Kumara Swamy & T. A. Kalyanam	Kopalli Venkataramana Rao
1954	Parivartana	Amma Amma Avanimaata	Ghantasala	T. Chalapathi Rao	Anisetti
1954	Raju Peda	Marindi Marindi Mana Rajakeeyame		S. Rajeswara Rao	
1954	Rechukka	Aaye Sambarame		G. Aswathama	Malladi Ramakrishna Sastry
1954	Rechukka	Ayyo Bangaru Saami		G. Aswathama	Malladi Ramakrishna Sastry
1954	Rechukka	Etu Choosina		G. Aswathama	Malladi Ramakrishna Sastry
1954	Rechukka	Neesari Nevanamma		G. Aswathama	Malladi Ramakrishna Sastry
1955	Ardhangi	Edche Vallani Edavani		Bhimavarapu Narasimha Rao & A. Rama Rao	Acharya Aatreya
1955	Ardhangi	Pelli Muhurtham Kudirindha		Bhimavarapu Narasimha Rao & A. Rama Rao	Acharya Aatreya
1955	Cherapakura Chedevu	Aapakuraa Murali		Ghantasala	Samudrala Jr.
1955	Cherapakura Chedevu	Yogamu Anuragamu		Ghantasala	Ravuri Bharadhwaja
1955	Jayasimha	Eenaati Eehaayi	Ghantasala	T. V. Raju	Samudrala Jr.
1955	Missamma	Ravoyi Chandamama	A. M. Rajah	S. Rajeswara Rao	Pingali Nagendrarao
1955	Missamma	Raaga Sudharasa	Jikki	S. Rajeswara Rao	Tyagaraja
1955	Missamma	Telusukonave Chelli		S. Rajeswara Rao	Pingali Nagendrarao
1955	Missamma	Yemito Ee Maaya		S. Rajeswara Rao	Pingali Nagendrarao
1955	Missamma	Karuninchu Mary Maathaa		S. Rajeswara Rao	Pingali Nagendrarao
1955	Vijaya Gauri			G. Ramanathan & Viswanathan–Ramamoorthy	Samudrala Jr.
1956	Bhale Ramudu	Bharatha Veera		S. Rajeswara Rao	Vempati Sadasivabrahmam
1956	Bhale Ramudu	Gopaladeva Kaapada Raava	P. B. Sreenivas	S. Rajeswara Rao	Vempati Sadasivabrahmam
1956	Bhale Ramudu	Intintanu Deepavali		S. Rajeswara Rao	Vempati Sadasivabrahmam
1956	Bhale Ramudu	Kala Maayamayena		S. Rajeswara Rao	Vempati Sadasivabrahmam
1956	Bhale Ramudu	Muralidharaa Hare Mohanakrishnaa		S. Rajeswara Rao	Vempati Sadasivabrahmam
1956	Bhale Ramudu	Oho Meghamala	Ghantasala	S. Rajeswara Rao	Vempati Sadasivabrahmam
1956	Bhale Ramudu	Oho Meghamala		S. Rajeswara Rao	Vempati Sadasivabrahmam
1956	Bhale Ramudu	Yemito Idhi Yemito	Ghantasala	S. Rajeswara Rao	Vempati Sadasivabrahmam
1956	Charana Daasi	Ee Dayachaluna Raa		S. Rajeswara Rao	Samudrala Sr.
1956	Chiranjeevulu	Alavaari Abbayi, Yenchakka	Ghantasala	Ghantasala	Malladi Ramakrishna Sastry
1956	Chiranjeevulu	Manasaina Pata Marani	Ghantasala	Ghantasala	Malladi Ramakrishna Sastry
1956	Chiranjeevulu	Marani Prema Mallelamala Edurayyenoo 1	Ghantasala	Ghantasala	Malladi Ramakrishna Sastry
1956	Chiranjeevulu	Marani Prema Mallelamala Edurayyenoo 2	Ghantasala	Ghantasala	Malladi Ramakrishna Sastry
1956	Chiranjeevulu	Marani Prema Mallelamala Edurayyenoo 1		Ghantasala	Malladi Ramakrishna Sastry
1956	Chiranjeevulu	Marani Prema Mallelamala Edurayyenoo 2		Ghantasala	Malladi Ramakrishna Sastry
1956	Chiranjeevulu	Allavade Repallevade Allibilli	Ghantasala	Ghantasala	Malladi Ramakrishna Sastry
1956	Chiranjeevulu	Chikilinta Chiguru Sampangi	Ghantasala	Ghantasala	Malladi Ramakrishna Sastry
1956	Chiranjeevulu	Endaka Endaka Endaka	Ghantasala	Ghantasala	Malladi Ramakrishna Sastry
1956	Chiranjeevulu	Yenaatikainaa Nee Danane		Ghantasala	Malladi Ramakrishna Sastry
1956	Chiranjeevulu	Tellavara Vacche Teliyaka		Ghantasala	Malladi Ramakrishna Sastry
1956	Chiranjeevulu	Kanupaapa Karavaina	Ghantasala	Ghantasala	Malladi Ramakrishna Sastry
1956	Ilavelpu	Nekhila Bhuvanapaalam		S. Dakshinamurthi	Sri Sri
1956	Ilavelpu	Neemamu Veedi Agnanamuche		S. Dakshinamurthi	Kosaraju Raghavaiah
1956	Ilavelpu	Challani Raja O Chandamama	Raghunath Panigrahi & P. Susheela	S. Dakshinamurthi	Vaddadi
1956	Ilavelpu	Swargamanna Vere Kalada		S. Dakshinamurthi	Anisetty
1956	Ilavelpu	O Chinglari		S. Dakshinamurthi	Kosaraju Raghavaiah
1956	Ilavelpu	Gampa Gaiyalli	Madhavapeddi Satyam	S. Dakshinamurthi	Kosaraju Raghavaiah
1956	Jayam Manade	Maruvajalani Mansu Chalani		Ghantasala	Samudrala Sr.
1956	Jayam Manade	Kaluvalaraja Kathavinarava		Ghantasala	Jampana Chandrasekhar Rao
1956	Jayam Manade	Enta Mosapotine Antuteliyaleka Ne		Ghantasala	Samudrala Sr.
1956	Penki Pellam	Sogasarivadu Shokainavadu		K. Prasada Rao	Aarudhra
1956	Sonta Ooru	Changu Changuna		Ghantasala	Ravuru
1956	Sonta Ooru	Yemi Prabhu		Ghantasala	Malladi Ramakrishna Sastry
1956	Sonta Ooru	Malle Moggalaraa	Ghantasala	Ghantasala	Malladi Ramakrishna Sastry
1956	Sonta Ooru	Pantapolalalo Egire Jantha	Ghantasala	Ghantasala	Ravuru
1956	Sri Gauri Mahatyam	Sreeminchumaa	P. Susheela	Ogirala Ramachandra Rao & T. V. Raju	Malladi Ramakrishna Sastry
1956	Sri Gauri Mahatyam	Siva Manohari	Ghantasala	Ogirala Ramachandra Rao & T. V. Raju	Malladi Ramakrishna Sastry
1956	Sri Gauri Mahatyam	Taara Reraju		Ogirala Ramachandra Rao & T. V. Raju	Malladi Ramakrishna Sastry
1956	Sri Gauri Mahatyam	Amma Yemamma		Ogirala Ramachandra Rao & T. V. Raju	Malladi Ramakrishna Sastry
1956	Tenali Ramakrishna	Jagamula Dayanele 1		Viswanathan–Ramamoorthy	Samudrala Sr.
1956	Tenali Ramakrishna	Jagamula Dayanele 2		Viswanathan–Ramamoorthy	Samudrala Sr.
1956	Tenali Ramakrishna	Ichchakaalu Neeku	Madhavapeddi Satyam	Viswanathan–Ramamoorthy	Samudrala Sr.
1956	Uma Sundari	Ammalara Raare		G. Aswathama	Vempati Sadasivabrahmam
1957	Bhale Ammayilu	Gopala Jaagelara	M. L. Vasanthakumari	S. Rajeswara Rao & S. Hanumantha Rao	Vempati Sadasivabrahmam
1957	Bhale Ammayilu	Madhi Uyyalalooge	Ghantasala	S. Rajeswara Rao & S. Hanumantha Rao	Vempati Sadasivabrahmam
1957	Dongallo Dora	Maadhavaa		M. Subrahmanyam Raju	Samudrala Sr.
1957	Dongallo Dora	Oho Rani, Oho Raja	Ghantasala	M. Subrahmanyam Raju	Samudrala Sr.
1957	Dongallo Dora	Vinnavaa Chinnadaanaa	Ghantasala	M. Subrahmanyam Raju	Samudrala Sr.
1957	Dongallo Dora	Aasale Maruna	Ghantasala	M. Subrahmanyam Raju	Samudrala Sr.
1957	Dongallo Dora	Nannelu Mohanudedamma		M. Subrahmanyam Raju	Samudrala Sr.
1957	Kutumba Gowravam	Challani Samsaram		Viswanathan–Ramamoorthy	Anisetti
1957	Kutumba Gowravam	Rammayya Mamayya		Viswanathan–Ramamoorthy	Anisetti
1957	Kutumba Gowravam	Anandale Nindali	Pithapuram Nageswara Rao & S. Janaki	Viswanathan–Ramamoorthy	Anisetti
1957	Kutumba Gowravam	Rayyudori Intikada	Madhavapeddi Satyam	Viswanathan–Ramamoorthy	Anisetti
1957	Mayabazar	Vardhillavammae		S. Rajeswara Rao & Ghantasala	Pingali Nagendrarao
1957	Mayabazar	Lahiri Lahiri	Ghantasala	S. Rajeswara Rao & Ghantasala	Pingali Nagendrarao
1957	Mayabazar	Neeve Naa	Ghantasala	S. Rajeswara Rao & Ghantasala	Pingali Nagendrarao
1957	Mayabazar	Choopulu Kalisina Subhavela	Ghantasala	S. Rajeswara Rao & Ghantasala	Pingali Nagendrarao
1957	Mayabazar	Neekosame	Ghantasala	S. Rajeswara Rao & Ghantasala	Pingali Nagendrarao
1957	Mayabazar	Vinnava Yesodhamma	P. Susheela	S. Rajeswara Rao & Ghantasala	Pingali Nagendrarao
1957	Panduranga Mahatyam	Kanavera Muni Raja		T. V. Raju	Samudrala Jr.
1957	Panduranga Mahatyam	Vannela Chinnela	Ghantasala	T. V. Raju	Samudrala Jr.
1957	Sankalpam	Kanugeeti Piliche	S. Dakshinamurthi	S. Dakshinamurthi	Anisetti
1957	Sarangadhara	Jaya Jaya Mangala Gowri		Ghantasala	Samudrala Jr.
1957	Sarangadhara	Annaana Bhamini	Ghantasala	Ghantasala	Samudrala Jr.
1957	Sarangadhara	Poyiraa Maayammaa		Ghantasala	Samudrala Jr.
1957	Sati Anasuya	Ooge Radigo		Ghantasala	
1957	Sati Anasuya	Oh Jagadaadhaara		Ghantasala	
1957	Suvarna Sundari	Bangaaru Vannela		P. Adinarayana Rao	Samudrala Sr.
1957	Suvarna Sundari	Kommanura		P. Adinarayana Rao	Kosaraju Raghavaiah
1957	Suvarna Sundari	Thadheem Nanana Thom Tillana	A. P. Komala	P. Adinarayana Rao	Kosaraju Raghavaiah
1957	Veera Kankanam	Ika Vaayinchakoyee Murali		S. Dakshinamurthi	Aarudhra
1957	Veera Kankanam	Aathmabali		S. Dakshinamurthi	Aarudhra
1957	Vinayaka Chaviti	Alinchara Moralinchara		Ghantasala	Samudrala Sr.
1957	Vinayaka Chaviti	Kannulalo Merise		Ghantasala	Samudrala Sr.
1957	Vinayaka Chaviti	Raja Premajoopara	M. S. Rama Rao	Ghantasala	Samudrala Sr.
1957	Vinayaka Chaviti	Tanuvooge Naa Manasuooge		Ghantasala	Samudrala Sr.
1958	Aada Pettanam	Valape Chalu Thalape Chalu		S. Rajeswara Rao & Master Venu	Samudrala Sr.
1958	Inti Guttu	Maa Chinni Papayi		M. S. Prakash	Devulapalli Krishnasastri
1958	Inti Guttu	Oho Varala Bala	Ghantasala	M. S. Prakash	Devulapalli Krishnasastri
1958	Inti Guttu	Saranu Saranu		M. S. Prakash	Devulapalli Krishnasastri
1958	Karthavarayuni Katha	Kaluva Rekula	Ghantasala, Pithapuram Nageswara Rao & A. P. Komala	G. Ramanathan & G. Aswathama	Malladi Ramakrishna Sastry
1958	Karthavarayuni Katha	Naa Manasemone		G. Ramanathan & G. Aswathama	Malladi Ramakrishna Sastry
1958	Karthavarayuni Katha	Mooge Chikati		G. Ramanathan & G. Aswathama	Malladi Ramakrishna Sastry
1958	Raja Nandini			T. V. Raju	Malladi Ramakrishna Sastry
1959	Appu Chesi Pappu Koodu	Cheyi Cheyi Kaluparave	A. M. Rajah	S. Rajeswara Rao	Pingali Nagendrarao
1959	Appu Chesi Pappu Koodu	Yechati Nundi Veecheno	Ghantasala	S. Rajeswara Rao	Pingali Nagendrarao
1959	Appu Chesi Pappu Koodu	Raama Raama Saranam		S. Rajeswara Rao	Pingali Nagendrarao
1959	Appu Chesi Pappu Koodu	Sundarangulanu Choosina Velana	A. M. Rajah & Ghantasala	S. Rajeswara Rao	Pingali Nagendrarao
1959	Appu Chesi Pappu Koodu	Kalam Kaani Kalamlo	P. Susheela	S. Rajeswara Rao	Pingali Nagendrarao
1959	Appu Chesi Pappu Koodu	Aanandham Paramaanandham 1	Ghantasala	S. Rajeswara Rao	Pingali Nagendrarao
1959	Appu Chesi Pappu Koodu	Aanandham Paramaanandham 2	Ghantasala	S. Rajeswara Rao	Pingali Nagendrarao
1959	Appu Chesi Pappu Koodu	Chitra Naleeyam	Ghantasala	S. Rajeswara Rao	Pingali Nagendrarao
1959	Appu Chesi Pappu Koodu	Joharu Gaikonara		S. Rajeswara Rao	Pingali Nagendrarao
1959	Bala Nagamma	Jaya Jaya Girijaa Ramanaa		T. V. Raju	Samudrala Jr.
1959	Bala Nagamma	Laali Laali		T. V. Raju	Samudrala Jr.
1959	Pellinaati Pramanalu	Brundavana Chandamama	Ghantasala	Ghantasala	Pingali Nagendra Rao
1959	Pellinaati Pramanalu	Neetone Lokamu	Ghantasala	Ghantasala	Pingali Nagendra Rao
1959	Pellinaati Pramanalu	Vennelalone Vedi	Ghantasala	Ghantasala	Pingali Nagendra Rao
1959	Pellinaati Pramanalu	Sreemanturalivai Cheluvondu		Ghantasala	Pingali Nagendra Rao
1959	Pellinaati Pramanalu	Laali Maa Papayi		Ghantasala	Pingali Nagendra Rao
1959	Pelli Sandadi	Appatiki Ippatiki		Ghantasala	Samudrala Jr.
1959	Pelli Sandadi	Chamak Chamak	Ghantasala	Ghantasala	Samudrala Jr.
1959	Pelli Sandadi	Jalle Bomabayi Le	Ghantasala & Jikki	Ghantasala	Samudrala Jr.
1959	Pelli Sandadi	Nallani Vade	K. Rani	Ghantasala	Samudrala Jr.
1959	Pelli Sandadi	Samayamidi Dayera Sarasudai	Jikki	Ghantasala	Samudrala Jr.
1959	Rechukka Pagatichukka	Vardhillara		T. V. Raju	Samudrala Jr.
1959	Rechukka Pagatichukka	Maa Aasa Neevega		T. V. Raju	Samudrala Jr.
1959	Sabhash Ramudu	Oh Deva Mora Vinava		Ghantasala	Sri Sri
1959	Sathi Sukanya	Jeevithame Manoharame		Ghantasala	Sriramchand
1959	Sathi Sukanya	Andaala Sogasulu Chindene		Ghantasala	Sriramchand
1959	Sathi Sukanya	Nede Haayi Haayi	Ghantasala	Ghantasala	Sriramchand
1959	Sathi Sukanya	Madhuramaina Reyi	Ghantasala	Ghantasala	Sriramchand
1959	Sathi Sukanya	Hey Jaganmathaa Karuna Sametha		Ghantasala	Sriramchand
1959	Sathi Sukanya	O Kaatyayanee		Ghantasala	
1959	Sathi Sukanya	Daana Japagni hotra Paratantrudu		Ghantasala	
1959	Sathi Sukanya	Patipada Seva Dakka Itarammagu		Ghantasala	
1959	Sathi Sukanya	Amrutakalasa Hastudaina		Ghantasala	
1959	Sathi Sukanya	Tapasa Vrutti Soukhyamuga	Madhavapeddi Satyam	Ghantasala	
1959	Sathi Sukanya	Ghorambai Chatulogra Bheekarambun		Ghantasala	
1959	Veera Bhaskarudu	Jayajaya Jagadamba Bhavani		S. Hanumantha Rao	Samudrala Jr.
1959	Veera Bhaskarudu	Valadoyi Kopalika		S. Hanumantha Rao	Samudrala Jr.
1959	Veera Bhaskarudu	Manasara Kalyani Palikinchu Veena	S. Varalakshmi	S. Hanumantha Rao	B. N. Chary
1959	Veera Bhaskarudu	Dhaari Kaanaradhaye	S. Varalakshmi	S. Hanumantha Rao	Samudrala Jr.

=== 1960s ===
Year	Movie/Album	Song	Co-singers	Music Director	Lyricist
1960	Bhakta Raghunath	Anandamanta	Ghantasala	Ghantasala	
1960	Bhakta Raghunath	Hey Sivashankara		Ghantasala	
1960	Bhakta Raghunath	Samsara	Ghantasala	Ghantasala	
1960	Bhakta Raghunath	Ee Prasantha Vela		Ghantasala	
1960	Bhakta Raghunath	Hey Jagannatha Swamy	Ghantasala	Ghantasala	
1960	Bhatti Vikramarka	Natinchana Jagalane Jayinchana	P. Susheela	Pendyala Nageswara Rao	Anisetti
1960	Deepavali	Madekada Bhagyamu	Ghantasala & A. P. Komala	Ghantasala	Samudrala Sr.
1960	Devanthakudu	Sreedevi		G. Ashwathama	Aarudhra
1960	Devanthakudu	Ilalo	N. L. Ganasaraswathi	G. Ashwathama	Aarudhra
1960	Kanna Kuthuru			K. V. Mahadevan	
1960	Maa Babu	Edamma Nee Raju		T. Chalapathi Rao	Samudrala Jr.
1960	Mahakavi Kalidasu	Rasikaraja	Radha Jayalakshmi	Pendyala Nageswara Rao	Pingali Nagendra Rao
1960	Mahakavi Kalidasu	Srikaramagu Paripaalana		Pendyala Nageswara Rao	Pingali Nagendra Rao
1960	Nammina Bantu	Ghama Ghama Ghamayinchu	Madhavapeddi Satyam	S. Rajeswara Rao & Master Venu	Kosaraju Raghavaiah
1960	Raja Makutam	Edanunnado Ekkadunnado		Master Venu	
1960	Raja Makutam	Sadiseyako Gali Sadiseya Boke		Master Venu	Devulapalli Krishnasastri
1960	Raja Makutam	Anjalide Janani Devi		Master Venu	
1960	Raja Makutam	Ninu choosi Neeli.... Ooredi Peredi O Chandamama	Ghantasala	Master Venu	Balantrapu Rajanikanta Rao
1960	Santhi Nivasam	Kalanaina Nee Valape		Ghantasala	Samudrala Jr.
1960	Santhi Nivasam	Selayeti Jaalulaga		Ghantasala	Samudrala Jr.
1960	Sri Venkateswara Mahatyam	Kalyana Vaibhavam	Jikki	Pendyala Nageswara Rao	Acharya Aatreya
1960	Sri Venkateswara Mahatyam	Velliraa Maathalli	P. S. Vaidehi	Pendyala Nageswara Rao	Acharya Aatreya
1961	Jagadeka Veeruni Katha	Jalakalatalalo	P. Susheela	Pendyala Nageswara Rao	Pingali Nagendra Rao
1961	Jagadeka Veeruni Katha	Nanu Dayaganava		Pendyala Nageswara Rao	Pingali Nagendra Rao
1961	Jagadeka Veeruni Katha	Varinchi Vachina Manava Veerudu	P. Susheela	Pendyala Nageswara Rao	Pingali Nagendra Rao
1961	Jagadeka Veeruni Katha	Adilakshmi Vanti Attagarivamma	P. Susheela	Pendyala Nageswara Rao	Pingali Nagendra Rao
1961	Sabhash Raja	Andala Ranivai	Ghantasala	Ghantasala	Aarudhra
1961	Seetharama Kalyanam	Sarasaala Javaraalanu		Gali Penchala Narasimha Rao	Samudrala Sr.
1961	Seetharama Kalyanam	Kolupuga		Gali Penchala Narasimha Rao	Samudrala Sr.
1961	Seetharama Kalyanam	Veyi Kannulu		Gali Penchala Narasimha Rao	Samudrala Sr.
1961	Seetharama Kalyanam	Pooni Bommaku		Gali Penchala Narasimha Rao	Samudrala Sr.
1961	Usha Parinayam	Devaa Hara Hara... Jaya Mahadeva Shambo	Madhavapeddi Satyam	S. Hanumantha Rao	
1961	Usha Parinayam	Mana Prema Gaatha	Ghantasala	S. Hanumantha Rao	Vempati Sadasivabrahmam
1962	Dakshayagnam	Nee Pada Samseva		S. Hanumantha Rao	Aarudhra
1962	Dakshayagnam	Emi Seyudu Devadeva		S. Hanumantha Rao	Aarudhra
1962	Dakshayagnam	Navarasa Bhavala	Radha Jayalakshmi	S. Hanumantha Rao	Aarudhra
1962	Gulebakavali Katha	Amba Jagadamaba		Joseph & Vijaya Krishna Murthy	C. Narayana Reddy
1962	Gundamma Katha	Manishi Maraledu	Ghantasala	Ghantasala	Pingali Nagendrarao
1962	Mahamantri Timmarusu	Jayavani Charana Kamala	Ghantasala	Pendyala Nageswara Rao	Pingali Nagendrarao
1962	Mahamantri Timmarusu	Jaya Jaya Jaya		Pendyala Nageswara Rao	Pingali Nagendrarao
1962	Mahamantri Timmarusu	Tadhastu Swamula Kolavandi	Ghantasala	Pendyala Nageswara Rao	Pingali Nagendrarao
1962	Mahamantri Timmarusu	Jaya Anare Jaya Anare		Pendyala Nageswara Rao	Pingali Nagendrarao
1962	Mahamantri Timmarusu	Andhra Deva		Pendyala Nageswara Rao	Pingali Nagendrarao
1962	Swarna Gowri	Laali Laali Bala Mukunda		M. Venkataraju	
1962	Tiger Ramudu	Enni Dinaalaku Vintiniraa		Ghantasala	Samudrala Jr.
1963	Aapta Mitrulu	Dayarada Naameeda		Ghantasala	Samudrala Jr.
1963	Aapta Mitrulu	Rathi Manmadha	A. P. Komala	Ghantasala	Samudrala Jr.
1963	Aapta Mitrulu	Raave Cheli Ee Vela	Ghantasala	Ghantasala	Samudrala Jr.
1963	Aapta Mitrulu	Ramananu Brovara	Swarnalatha & Udutha Sarojini	Ghantasala	Samudrala Jr.
1963	Bandipotu	Malliyallo Malliyallo	Ghantasala	Ghantasala	C. Narayana Reddy
1963	Bandipotu	Anta Nee Kosam	Ghantasala	Ghantasala	Vempati Sadasivabrahmam
1963	Lava Kusa	Jagadabhi Ramudu Sriraamude	Ghantasala, P. Susheela & Mallik	Ghantasala	Samudrala Sr.
1963	Lava Kusa	Ramakathanu Vinarayyaa Ihapara	P. Susheela	Ghantasala	Samudrala Sr.
1963	Lava Kusa	Vurake Kanniru Nimpa	P. Susheela	Ghantasala	Samudrala Sr.
1963	Lava Kusa	Vinudu Vinudu Ramayana	P. Susheela	Ghantasala	Samudrala Sr.
1963	Lava Kusa	Sriraamuni Charitamunu	P. Susheela	Ghantasala	Samudrala Sr.
1963	Lava Kusa	Srirama Sugunadhama Jayarama	P. Susheela	Ghantasala	Samudrala Sr.
1963	Lava Kusa	Leru Kushalavula Saati	P. Susheela	Ghantasala	Vempati Sadasivabrahmam
1963	Lava Kusa	Sriraama Parandhamaa	P. Susheela & K. Jamuna Rani	Ghantasala	Samudrala Sr.
1963	Lava Kusa	Stree Balavrudhula Tega	Ghantasala & P. Susheela	Ghantasala	Samudrala Sr.
1963	Lava Kusa	Thandri Pampunanegi	Ghantasala & P. Susheela	Ghantasala	Samudrala Sr.
1963	Lava Kusa	Takkani Balakundani		Ghantasala	Samudrala Sr.
1963	Lava Kusa	Ninu Dattadriki Cherakunda		Ghantasala	
1963	Pempudu Koothuru	Nee Jaada Kananaitiraa		T. G. Lingappa	C. Narayana Reddy
1963	Valmiki	Mudamu Kanedepudo	S. Janaki	Ghantasala	Samudrala Sr.
1964	Babruvahana	Manasemo Vayyaarala	Ghantasala	Paamarthi	Samudrala Sr.
1964	Babruvahana	Yelaraa Manohara		Paamarthi	Samudrala Sr.
1964	Marmayogi	Navvula Nadhilo		Ghantasala	Aarudhra
1964	Sri Satyanarayana Mahathyam	Jaya Jaya Sreemannarayana	Ghantasala	Ghantasala	Samudrala Jr.
1964	Sri Satyanarayana Mahathyam	Siva Siva Siva Paramesha	A. P. Komala	Ghantasala	Samudrala Jr.
1964	Sri Tirupatamma Katha	Sri Venkatesa		Pamarthi	Bollimunta Sivaramakrishna
1964	Sri Tirupatamma Katha	Kougili Kailasamu		Pamarthi	Daasarathi Krishnamacharyulu
1964	Sri Tirupatamma Katha	Poovai Virisina		Pamarthi	C. Narayana Reddy
1964	Vaarasatwam	Chilipi Krishnuni	Ghantasala	Ghantasala	Narla Chiranjeevi
1964	Vaarasatwam	Sudi Gaalilo		Ghantasala	Aarudhra
1965	Kathanayakuni Katha	Vemanna Cheppindhi	Ghantasala	K. V. Mahadevan	Kosaraju Raghavaiah
1965	Pandava Vanavasamu	Devaa Deena Baandhava		Ghantasala	Samudrala Sr.
1965	Pandava Vanavasamu	Mahinele Maharaju	L. R. Eswari	Ghantasala	Samudrala Sr.
1965	Prameelarjuneeyam	Dharani Samstha Rajkula		Pendyala Nageswara Rao	Pingali Nagendra Rao
1965	Prameelarjuneeyam	Purushulandune Veerulu		Pendyala Nageswara Rao	Pingali Nagendra Rao
1965	Prameelarjuneeyam	Ghana Kurukshetra	Madhavapeddi Satyam	Pendyala Nageswara Rao	Pingali Nagendra Rao
1965	Prameelarjuneeyam	Akhila Sangrama		Pendyala Nageswara Rao	Pingali Nagendra Rao
1965	Satya Harishchandra (1965 Telugu film)	Vidhi Vipareetham	Ghantasala	Pendyala Nageswara Rao	Pingali Nagendra Rao
1966	Paramanandayya Sishyula Katha	Kaaminee Madana Raa Raa	Ghantasala	Ghantasala	Samudrala Sr.
1966	Paramanandayya Sishyula Katha	Vanitha Thananthata	A. P. Komala	Ghantasala	Vempati Sadasivabrahmam
1966	Shakuntala	Ammaa Sakunthalaa		Ghantasala	Sri Sri
1966	Sri Krishna Tulabharam	Rukmini Puttinanadu	Ghantasala & P. Susheela	Pendyala Nageswara Rao	Samudrala Sr.
1966	Srikakula Andhra Maha Vishnu Katha	Jayahe Jayahe		Pendyala Nageswara Rao	Pingali Nagendra Rao
1967	Bhuvana Sundari Katha	Entha Chilipi	P. Susheela	Ghantasala	C. Narayana Reddy
1967	Rahasyam	Idiye Deva Rahasyam	P. Susheela	Ghantasala	Aarudhra
1967	Rahasyam	Srilalitha Shivajyothi Sarvakaamadaa	Ghantasala, P. S. Vaidehi, Udutha Sarojini, A. P. Komala & Padma	Ghantasala	Malladi Ramakrishna Sastry
1967	Sri Krishnavataram	Jayahe Krishnavatara	Ghantasala, Swarnalata & Udutha Sarojini	T. V. Raju	Samudrala Sr.
1967	Sri Krishnavataram	Vinara Vinara		T. V. Raju	C. Narayana Reddy
1967	Sri Krishnavataram	Nee Charana Kamalaana	Ghantasala & P. Susheela	T. V. Raju	C. Narayana Reddy
1967	Ummadi Kutumbam	Kutumbam Ummadi Kutumbam	Ghantasala	T. V. Raju	C. Narayana Reddy
1967	Vasantha Sena	Digara Digara	S. Janaki	S. Rajeswara Rao	Kosaraju Raghavaiah
1968	Thalli Prema	Kalalo Ilalo	P. Susheela	R. Sudarsanam	Daasarathi Krishnamacharyulu
1968	Uma Chandi Gowri Shankarula Katha	Sri Gowri		Pendyala Nageswara Rao	Pingali Nagendra Rao
1969	Manushulu Marali	Bhoomatha Eenadu	P. Susheela	K. V. Mahadevan	

=== 1970s ===
Year	Movie/Album	Song	Co-singers	Music Director	Lyricist
1970	Lakshmi Kataksham	Swagatham Swagatham	S. Janaki	S. P. Kodandapani	Chellara Bhavanarayana Rao
1970	Sambarala Rambabu	Vinnaaraa Vinnaaraa	K. Jamuna Rani, K. Swarna, Madhavapeddi Satyam, Pithapuram Nageswara Rao & J. V. Raghavulu	V. Kumar	Rajasri
1971	Nindu Dampathulu	Anaganagaa Okavooru	S. P. Balasubrahmanyam & B. Vasantha	T. V. Raju & Vijaya Krishna Murthy	C. Narayana Reddy
1971	Sampoorna Ramayanam			K. V. Mahadevan	
1972	Sri Krishnanjaneya Yuddham	Gopala Krishna Jayaho Balarama	Pithapuram Nageswara Rao	T. V. Raju	C. Narayana Reddy
1974	O Seeta Katha	Bhaaratanaarii Charitamu		K. V. Mahadevan	Veturi
1975	Sri Ramanjaneya Yuddham	Meluko Srirama	M. Balamuralikrishna	K. V. Mahadevan	Daasarathi Krishnamacharyulu
1978	Sati Savitri	Oogave Naa Thalli	P. Susheela	Ghantasala & Pendyala Nageswara Rao	Acharya Aatreya
1978	Sati Savitri	Pamputhunamma	P. Susheela	Ghantasala & Pendyala Nageswara Rao	Acharya Aatreya
