= Jikki discography =

Pillavalu Gajapathi Krishnaveni (3 November 1935 – 16 August 2004), popularly known as Jikki, was an Indian playback singer. She sang mainly in Telugu and Tamil films. She also sang in Kannada, Malayalam, Hindi, and Sinhala languages.

== Discography ==
Song	Film	Year	Music	Lyrics	Co-singer	Actor	Language
Aadaadha Aatamellam Aaduranga Paaduraanga	Manamulla Maruthaaram	1958	K. V. Mahadevan	A. Maruthakasi	Seerkazhi Govindarajan	B. Saroja Devi	Tamil
Aadamule Natakam	Sri Tirupatamma Katha	1964	Pamarthi	Sivaramaiah	Pithapuram Nageswara Rao		Telugu
Aada Vanga Annaththaa	Chakravarthi Thirumagal	1957	G. Ramanathan	Ku. Ma. Balasubramaniam	Seerkazhi Govindarajan & P. Leela	G. Sakunthala	Tamil
Aadharavilla Poongodi	Aasai	1956	T. R. Pappa		A. M. Rajah	Padmini	Tamil
Aadi Paadi Thinam Thedinalum Eesan (Kaadalagi Kasindu Kanneer Malgiye)	Kangal	1953	S. V. Venkatraman			Padmini	Tamil
Aadippaadi Vilanguka	Marumakal	1952	P. S. Divakar	Abhayadev		Padmini	Malayalam
Aadi Vinnara	Cherapakura Chedevu	1955	Ghantasala	Ravuri Rangiah		Rajasulochana	Telugu
Aaduva Aaseya	Makkala Rajya	1960	T. G. Lingappa	Kanagal Prabhakar Shastry	A. P. Komala		Kannada
Aaduvoma Koodi Kulavi	Kaalam Maari Pochu	1956	Master Venu	Muhavai Rajamanickam		Anjali Devi	Tamil
Aahaahaa Aasai Theera Aadalaame	Sengottai Singam	1958	K. V. Mahadevan	A. Maruthakasi	T. M. Soundararajan	B. Saroja Devi	Tamil
Aahaa Naan Indru Arindhukonden	Avan	1953	Shankar Jaikishan	Kambadasan		Nargis	Tamil
Aaha Ennai Paar	Magudam Kaattha Mangai	1957	K. V. Mahadevan		T. A. Mothi	Padmini	Tamil
Aalasimpakoyi Aadharinthimuyi	Kanakathara	1956	Balantrapu Rajanikanta Rao				Telugu
Aalinte Kombathe	Krishna Kuchela	1961	K. Raghavan	P. Bhaskaran	P. Leela & Santha P. Nair		Malayalam
Aa Manasemo Aa Sogasemo	Rechukka	1954	G. Aswathama	Malladi Ramakrishna Sastry		Devika	Telugu
Aambalkki Kann Potta... Gum Gum Gum	Petra Maganai Vitra Annai	1958	Viswanathan-Ramamoorthy	Thanjai N. Ramaiah Dass	Thiruchi Loganathan	Kumari Rajamani	Tamil
Aanadhu Aachu Ponadhu Pochu	Manjal Mahimai	1959	Master Venu	Udumalai Narayana Kavi	S. C. Krishnan	Rajasulochana	Tamil
Aanakeramalayilu	Palattu Koman	1962	M. S. Baburaj	Vayalar Ramavarma	K. P. Udayabhanu & K. S. George		Malayalam
Aanandam Mana Jivana Ragam	Priyuralu	1952	S. Rajeswara Rao		Ghantasala & R. Balasaraswathi Devi		Telugu
Aanandhaa Mahadaanandha	Rathnagiri Rahasya	1957	T. G. Lingappa	Kanagal Prabhakara Shastry	Soolamangalam Rajalakshmi & K. Rani	Sowcar Janaki	Kannada
Aanandhamaaye Ali Neelaveni	Chenchu Lakshmi	1958	S. Rajeswara Rao	Aarudhra	Ghantasala	Anjali Devi	Telugu
Aanandhamanta Nee Rayamenani	Sobha	1958	A. M. Rajah	P. Vasanth Kumar Reddy	A. M. Rajah	Anjali Devi	Telugu
Aanandham Aanandham	Kudumbam	1954	Pendyala Nageswara Rao	M. S. Subramaniam		Savitri	Tamil
Aanandhame Andalu	Anarkali	1955	P. Adinarayana Rao	Samudrala Sr.		Anjali Devi	Telugu
Aanandham Eedhe Alidula Veni	Chenchu Lakshmi	1958	S. Rajeswara Rao		Ghantasala	Anjali Devi	Tamil
Aanandham Inge Irukku	Chella Pillai	1955	R. Sudarsanam		T. M. Soundararajan	Savitri	Tamil
Aanandham Pudhu Aanandham	Thangamalai Ragasiyam	1957	T. G. Lingappa	Ku. Ma. Balasubramaniam	Soolamangalam Rajalakshmi & K. Rani	T. R. Rajakumari	Tamil
Aanandham.... Naanum Kuditthen	Anarkali	1955	P. Adinarayana Rao	Thanjai N. Ramaiah Dass		Anjali Devi	Tamil
Aanandharoopan	Ponkathir	1953	Br Lakshmanan	Thirunainar Kurichi Madhavan Nair		Lalitha	Malayalam
Aankhon Se Meri	Gulebakavali	1956	Gyan Dutt	Pyarelal Santoshi		G. Varalakshmi	Hindi
Aanukkum Pennukkum	Moondru Pengal	1956	K. V. Mahadevan	Thanjai N. Ramaiah Dass			Tamil
Aanum Pennum Serndhu Padichaa	Vaira Maalai	1954	Viswanathan-Ramamoorthy	Kannadasan			Tamil
Aao Aao Kahani Suno	Mr Sampat	1952	B. S. Kalla & Emani Sankara Sastry		Geeta Dutt	Vanaja	Hindi
Aaraaro Aaraaro	Kattuthulasi	1965	M. S. Baburaj	Vayalar Ramavarma		Sharada	Malayalam
Aaraaro Aaraaro Aariraaro Amudhe	Azhagi	1953	P. R. Mani			Revathy	Tamil
Aasai Ellam Niraasai	Marma Veeran	1956	Vedha			Vyjayanthimala	Tamil
Aasaigal Malarvadhu Paruva Nenjile	Pudhiya Pathai	1960	Master Venu	A. Maruthakasi	T. M. Soundararajan	Savitri	Tamil
Aasai Kanavugale Sadhaavum	Manamulla Maruthaaram	1958	K. V. Mahadevan	A. Maruthakasi	L. R. Eswari & G. Kasthoori	B. Saroja Devi	Tamil
Aasai Machchan.... Azhagaana Chinna Ponnu	Thirudadhe	1961	S. M. Subbaiah Naidu	Ku. Sa. Krishnamurthy	Seerkazhi Govindarajan	Rita	Tamil
Aasai Mozhi Pesuthu	Sollu Thambi Sollu	1959	K. V. Mahadevan	A. Maruthakasi	Seerkazhi Govindarajan	Rajasulochana	Tamil
Aasai Nila Sendrathae	Maaman Magal	1955	S. V. Venkatraman			Savitri	Tamil
Aasai Pongum Azhagu Rubam	Aasai	1956	T. R. Pappa		A. M. Rajah	Padmini	Tamil
Aasai Vaikkira Idam Theriyanum	Kalai Arasi	1963	K. V. Mahadevan	Pattukkottai Kalyanasundaram	P. Bhanumathi	G. Sakunthala	Tamil
Aasaiyin Oonjalil Aadiduvom	Kuzhandhaigal Kanda Kudiyarasu	1960	T. G. Lingappa	Ku. Ma. Balasubramaniam	A. P. Komala		Tamil
Aasalu Theerchave	Shanthi Nivasam	1960	Ghantasala	Samudrala Jr.		Rajasulochana	Telugu
Aashala Uyyala Oogema	Pillalu Techina Challani Rajyam	1960	T. G. Lingappa		A. P. Komala		Telugu
Ashaavasantham Anuraagasungandham	Snehadeepam	1962	M. B. Sreenivasan	P. Bhaskaran		Ambika	Malayalam
Aatalu Sagunate	Penki Pellam	1956	K. Prasad Rao	Aarudhra		Rajasulochana	Telugu
Aavanna Doonaa Aadu	Thirumbi Paar	1953	G. Ramanathan	Kannadasan		Pandari Bai	Tamil
Aayirathiri	Kadalamma	1963	G. Devarajan	Vayalar Ramavarma	S. Janaki		Malayalam
Ada Moona Asal Mukkaalanaa	Kathavarayan	1958	G. Ramanathan	Thanjai N. Ramaiah Dass	T. M. Soundararajan	E. V. Saroja	Tamil
Ada Sitinaa Mey	Aiyai Malli	1957					Sinhala
Adhu Vendaam Idhu Vendaam	Illarame Inbam	1956	Ghantasala			Rajasulochana	Tamil
Adi Kamachchiye Enthan Kanne	Samsaram	1951	Emani Sankara Sastry	Kothamangalam Subbu	A. M. Rajah	M. S. Sundari Bai	Tamil
Adigadigo Gagana Seema Andamaina	Naa Illu	1953	V. Nagayya	Devulapalli Krishnasastri	R. Balasaraswathi Devi		Telugu
Aho Vidhiyo Paaram.... Priyaa Madhanaa	Vanamala	1951	P. S. Divakar	P. Kunjikrishna Menon		Ammini	Malayalam
Akkaanum [Badarul Muneer]	Aayisha	1964	R. K. Shekhar	Vayalar Ramavarma	A. M. Rajah, Mehboob & P. Susheela		Malayalam
Alaigalil Neendhiye Aadadi	Madhu Malathi	1968	M. Ranga Rao	Devanarayanan		Bharathi	Tamil
Alakinchavoyi	Vaddante Dabbu	1954	T. A. Kalyanam	Devulapalli Krishnasastri		Jamuna	Telugu
Alanati	Murari	2001	Mani Sharma		Sunitha Upadrashta & Sandhya	Sonali Bendre	Telugu
Alladi Avatala	Vaddante Dabbu	1954	T. A. Kalyanam	Vempati Sadasivabrahmam		Jamuna	Telugu
Allah Unnai Ennaalum Kaakka Vendum	Akbar	1961	Naushad	Kambadasan		Madhubala	Tamil
Amaidhi Nilava Vazhiyum	Nanban	1954	G. Ramanathan	Thanjai N. Ramaiah Dass			Tamil
Amdala Chinnadana	Laila Majnu	1949	C. R. Subburaman	Samudrala Sr.	P. Leela	Padmini	Telugu
Ammaa Ivar Summaa	Thirudargal Jakkirathai	1958	K. V. Mahadevan	Thanjai N. Ramaiah Dass		Girija	Tamil
Ammaan Magal Paaru	Kaanal Neer	1961	Master Venu			Devika	Tamil
Ammaa Pasikkudhe	Samsaram	1951	Emani Sankara Sastry	Kothamangalam Subbu	Udutha Sarojini		Tamil
Ammaa Pena Ange Inge	Magudam Kaattha Mangai	1957	K. V. Mahadevan				Tamil
Ammaa Pettammaa	Ammayenna Sthree	1970	A. M. Rajah	Vayalar Ramavarma		K. R. Vijaya	Malayalam
Ammaa Sailajata	Uma Sundari	1956	G. Aswathama	Vempati Sadasivabrahmam		Sriranjani	Telugu
Ammaave Dheivam Ulaginile	Amma	1952	V. Dakshinamurthy	Chidambaram Varadarajan			Tamil
Ambuli Maamaa Shokku Paarka	Kudumbam	1954	Pendyala Nageswara Rao	M. S. Subramaniam	A. M. Rajah	Savitri	Tamil
Amdala Bomma	Nammina Bantu	1960	S. Rajeswara Rao & Master Venu	Kosaraju Raghavaiah	Madhavapeddi Satyam	Girija	Telugu
Ananganai Nigarttha Azhagane	Gomathiyin Kaadhalan	1955	G. Ramanathan	K. P. Kamatchisundharam		Savitri	Tamil
Anbaai Odi Vaadaa	Dharma Devatha	1952	C. R. Subburaman		C. R. Subburaman & A. G. Rathnamala	Girija	Tamil
Anbanae Aasai Palithidumaa	Panam Paduthum Padu	1954	T. A. Kalyanam			Jamuna	Tamil
Anbe En Aaruyire Angu Nirpadheno	Kaveri	1955	G. Ramanathan	Udumalai Narayana Kavi	C. S. Jayaraman	Padmini	Tamil
Anbe En Aaruyire Vaaraai	Gomathiyin Kaadhalan	1955	G. Ramanathan	Ku. Ma. Balasubramaniam	Seerkazhi Govindarajan	Savitri	Tamil
Anbe Enthan Munnale	Aaravalli	1957	G. Ramanathan	Kannadasan	A. M. Rajah	Mynavathi	Tamil
Anbe En Raaja Assai Kannaalane	Chenchu Lakshmi	1958	S. Rajeswara Rao		Ghantasala	Anjali Devi	Tamil
Anbe Namadhu Ilangkaadhal	Dharma Devatha	1952	C. R. Subburaman			Girija	Tamil
Anbe Nee Ange	Bommai Kalyanam	1958	K. V. Mahadevan	A. Maruthakasi	A. M. Rajah	Jamuna	Tamil
Anbe Vaa	Avan	1953	Shankar Jaikishan	Kambadasan	A. M. Rajah	Nargis	Tamil
Andaala Rathini	Manohara	1954	S. V. Venkatraman			P. K. Saraswathi	Telugu
Andaalu Chindu Mana Prema	Varalakshmi Vratham	1961	Rajan–Nagendra		P. B. Sreenivas	Krishna Kumari	Telugu
Anda Chandala Sogasari Vaadu	Donga Ramudu	1955	Pendyala Nageswara Rao	Samudrala Sr.		Savitri	Telugu
Andala Naa Raja	Cherapakura Chedevu	1955	Ghantasala	Samudrala Jr.		Rajasulochana	Telugu
Andaala Raja	Stree Sahasam	1951	C. R. Subburaman	Samudrala Sr.	S. Dakshinamurthi		Telugu
Andala Seemalo	Sobha	1958	A. M. Rajah	P. Vasanth Kumar Reddy	A. M. Rajah	Anjali Devi	Telugu
Andalu Chandalu Kannaa Raa	Manohara	1954	S. V. Venkatraman			P. K. Saraswathi	Telugu
Andalu Chindu Tara	Sobha	1958	A. M. Rajah	P. Vasanth Kumar Reddy	A. M. Rajah	Anjali Devi	Telugu
Andamannadi Prati Anuvu	Prema Pichchi	1981	Ilaiyaraaja	Rajasri		Rati Agnihotri	Telugu
Andam Chinde	Vachina Kodalu Nachindi	1959	S. Dakshinamurthi	Acharya Aatreya		Jamuna	Telugu
Andhaalu Chiddu Seemalo	Raja Nandini	1958	T. V. Raju	Ravuri Rangiah	A. M. Rajah	Anjali Devi	Telugu
Andhalalone	Renuka Devi Mahathyam	1960	L. Malleswara Rao		A. M. Rajah		Telugu
Andha Raamanum Indha Seethaiyum	Pakku Vethilai	1980	Malaysia Vasudevan	Pulavar Mari			Tamil
Andhi Saayum Velai	Ellorum Vazhavendum	1962	Rajan-Nagendra	Villiputhan		Malini	Tamil
Andhi Saayum Velai (different version)	Ellorum Vazhavendum	1962	Rajan-Nagendra	Villiputhan		Malini	Tamil
Aneeka Jaathi Sansaare	Jeevitha Satana	1957	Vedha	D. T. Fernando	Mohideen Baig & P. Susheela		Sinhala
Anganeyangane [Badarul Muneer]	Aayisha	1964	R. K. Shekhar	Vayalar Ramavarma	A. M. Rajah, Mehboob & P. Susheela		Malayalam
Angeye Arugil Adhuve	Panam Paduthum Padu	1954	T. A. Kalyanam			Jamuna	Tamil
Angum Ingum Paartthidaamal	Sadhaaram	1956	G. Ramanathan	A. Maruthakasi		Kumari Kala Devi	Tamil
Annaa Annaa Vinnavaa	Ilavelpu	1956	S. Dakshinamurthi	Anisetti		Anjali Devi	Telugu
Annaa Chellelu	Uma Sundari	1956	G. Aswathama	Vempati Sadasivabrahmam		Sriranjani	Telugu
Annaale Nannaal	Kanavu	1954	G. Ramanathan & V. Dakshinamoorthy	A. Maruthakasi		Lalitha	Tamil
Annamma Ennamma Sollure	Uthami Petra Rathinam	1960	T. Chalapathi Rao	Thanjai N. Ramaiah Dass	S. C. Krishnan	Manorama	Tamil
Anpezhum Priya Thozhikale	Chandrika	1950	V. Dakshinamoorthy & G. Govindarajulu Naidu	Thumbaman Padmanabhan Kutty			Malayalam
Anuraagaseema Manameluthama	Veera Kumar	1961	Rajan–Nagendra		P. B. Sreenivas	Krishna Kumari	Tamil
Anuraagaseema Manameluthama	Varalakshmi Vratham	1961	Rajan–Nagendra		P. B. Sreenivas	Krishna Kumari	Telugu
Appaavoda Chellamaa	Punithavathi	1963	Hussein Reddy	Kanaga Surabhi	A. M. Rajah		Tamil
Appam Thinnaan Thappukottu	Umma	1960	M. S. Baburaj	P. Bhaskaran			Malayalam
Aram Katha Theviye	Maheswari	1955	G. Ramanathan		A. M. Rajah	Savithri	Tamil
Arana Ana Aina	Pellinaati Pramanalu	1959	Ghantasala	Pingali Nagendra Rao			Telugu
Arasaanda Raaman Pola Azhagaana Veeran	Murari	2002	Mani Sharma		Kalpana Raghavendar & Sujatha		Tamil
Arivulla Azhagane.... Inba Vaazhvil	Nalla Thangai	1955	G. Ramanathan	A. Maruthakasi	Thiruchi Loganathan	Madhuri Devi	Tamil
Ariyaadha Pillai Pole Aaatthira Padalaamaa	Thangamalai Ragasiyam	1957	T. G. Lingappa	Ku. Ma. Balasubramaniam	V. N. Sundaram	T. R. Rajakumari	Tamil
Arul Thaarum Deva Maathaave	Gnana Soundari	1948	S. V. Venkatraman		P. A. Periyanayaki	Baby Rajamani	Tamil
Asalu Neevu Raanela	Nithya Kalyanam Paccha Thoranam	1960	Pendyala Nageswara Rao		P. B. Sreenivas	Krishna Kumari	Telugu
Atta Leni Kodalu Uttamuralu	Mana Desam	1949	Ghantasala	Samudrala Sr.			Telugu
Athai Magan Thaanunga	Nanban	1954	G. Ramanathan	Thanjai N. Ramaiah Dass	Thiruchi Loganathan		Tamil
Avar Mella Mella	Samsaram	1951	Emani Sankara Sastry	Kothamangalam Subbu		Vanaja	Tamil
Avasaram Thaano Naan Agapaduveno	Yaanai Valartha Vaanambadi	1959	Br Lakshmanan	Ku. Ma. Balasubramaniam			Tamil
Ayyare Chuda Chakkani	Kalimilemulu	1961	G. Aswathama	Malladi Ramakrishna Sastry			Telugu
Azhagaana Rojaa Poove	Poongothai	1953	P. Adinarayana Rao	Kambadasan	M. Ranga Rao	Anjali Devi	Tamil
Azhagai Paar	Pudhumai Pithan	1957	G. Ramanathan	Thanjai N. Ramaiah Dass		E. V. Saroja	Tamil
Azhagai Rasippom Kalaiyai Valarppom	Vazhvile Oru Naal	1956	C. N. Pandurangan, T. G. Lingappa & S. M. Subbaiah Naidu	Ku. Sa. Krishnamurthy		Rajasulochana	Tamil
Azhage Thaanae Aagume	Mayakkari	1951	P. Adinarayana Rao			Anjali Devi	Tamil
Azhagin Raani Yaarenake Inaiyaavaar	Kumaari	1952	K. V. Mahadevan			Madhuri Devi	Tamil
Azhagirukku Arivirukku	Pillai Kaniyamudhu	1958	K. V. Mahadevan	A. Maruthakasi		M. N. Rajam	Tamil
Azhagodaiyil Neendhum Ila annam	Kokilavani	1956	G. Ramanathan	S. D. Sundharam	Seerkazhi Govindarajan	Tambaram Lalitha	Tamil
Azhagu Mugam Pazhagu Sugam	Sorgam	1970	M. S. Viswanathan	Kannadasan	S. Janaki		Tamil
Azhagu Nilavin Bavaniyile	Maheswari	1955	G. Ramanathan		A. M. Rajah	Savithri	Tamil
Azhaiyaadha Veettil Nuzhayaadha Seemaan	Ponvayal	1954	Thuraiyur Rajagopal Sarma & R. Rajagopal	T. K. Sundara Vathiyar			Tamil
Baagyasaali Yaanene	Mayakkari	1951	P. Adinarayana Rao			Anjali Devi	Tamil
Baaren Manohara Oh Sukhanhara	Abba Aa Hudugi	1959	P. Kalinga Rao	H. L. N. Simha		Mynavathi	Kannada
Baby Chinna Baby	Thai Ullam	1952	V. Nagayya & A. Rama Rao	Kanaga Surabhi		Madhuri Devi	Tamil
Bagavane Un Padaippile	Moondru Pengal	1956	K. V. Mahadevan	Thanjai N. Ramaiah Dass	Seerkazhi Govindarajan		Tamil
Bangaru Bomma	Bhale Ramudu	1956	S. Rajeswara Rao	Vempati Sadasivabrahmam	P. B. Sreenivas	Seetha	Telugu
Baila Baila Cycle	Mamiyarum Oru Veetu Marumagale	1961	Pendyala Nageswara Rao	A. Maruthakasi	Seerkazhi Govindarajan	M. N. Rajam	Tamil
Balu Vannela Chinnela	Inti Guttu	1958	M. S. Prakash	Malladi Ramakrishna Sastry		Savitri	Telugu
Beedala Rodana Vinava	Edi Nijam	1956	Master Venu			Sowcar Janaki	Telugu
Bhaagyamulla Thampuraane	Palattu Koman	1962	M. S. Baburaj	Vayalar Ramavarma	K. S. George		Malayalam
Bhaaratha Devi Jeganthanil	Niraparadhi	1951	Ghantasala & H. R. Padmanabha Sastri	M. S. Subramaniam	Ghantasala	Anjali Devi	Tamil
Bhale Maavayya	Thodi Kodallu	1957	Master Venu	Sri Sri		Rajasulochana	Telugu
Bindiya Chamke	Pathala Bhairavi	1951	Ghantasala				Hindi
Bito Bito Pellikodaka	Pelli Sandadi	1959	Ghantasala	Samudrala Jr.	J. V. Raghavulu	B. Saroja Devi	Telugu
Bojanam Banthi	Subbaraju Gari Kutumbam	1998	M. M. Keeravani	Veturi Sundaramurthi	K. S. Chithra		Telugu
Boomiyile Oru Punniya Kathai	En Veedu	1953	V. Nagayya	Surabhi	R. Balasaraswathi Devi		Tamil
Brathuku Nee Kosame	Inti Guttu	1958	M. S. Prakash	Malladi Ramakrishna Sastry		Savitri	Telugu
Chaanchakkam	Palattu Koman	1962	M. S. Baburaj	Vayalar Ramavarma			Malayalam
Chaka Chaka Janatha	Bhale Ammayilu	1957	S. Rajeswara Rao & S. Hanumantha Rao	Kosaraju Raghavaiah		Savitri	Telugu
Chakkani Vaadaa	Inti Guttu	1958	M. S. Prakash	Malladi Ramakrishna Sastry		Savitri	Telugu
Chakkani Vaade	Pendli Pilupu	1961	K. Prasad Rao	Sri Sri			Telugu
Challani Vennela	Velugu Needalu	1961	Pendyala Nageswara Rao	Sri Sri	P. Susheela	Girija	Telugu
Chalo Paniya Bharan	Mr. Sampat	1952	B. S. Kalla & Emani Sankara Sastry		Geeta Dutt	Vanaja	Hindi
Chandha Maamaa Shokku	Menarikam	1954	Pendyala Nageswara Rao		A. M. Rajah	Savitri	Telugu
Chandhrodhayam Pole Indha Jegam Meedhile	Chenchu Lakshmi	1958	S. Rajeswara Rao			Anjali Devi	Tamil
Changure Bangaru Raajaa	Sri Krishna Pandaveeyam	1966	T. V. Raju	C. Narayana Reddy			Telugu
Chencheetanayya	Penki Pellam	1956	K. Prasad Rao	Aarudhra	A. M. Rajah	Rajasulochana	Telugu
Cheetiki Maatiki Chittemmante	Sri Lakshmamma Katha	1950	C. R. Subburaman		Kasturi Siva Rao		Telugu
Cheetiki Maatiki	Bhale Ammayilu	1957	S. Rajeswara Rao & S. Hanumantha Rao	Kosaraju Raghavaiah	P. B. Sreenivas	Chhaya Devi	Telugu
Chekkili Meeda	Mangalya Balam	1959	Master Venu	Sri Sri	Madhavapeddi Satyam	Rajasulochana	Telugu
Chella Kiliye Sendhaamaraiye	Ponnu Vilaiyum Boomi	1959	K. H. Reddy	A. Maruthakasi	S. Janaki	Padmini	Tamil
Chettulekkagalava O Narahari	Chenchu Lakshmi	1958	S. Rajeswara Rao	Aarudhra	Ghantasala	Anjali Devi	Telugu
Chilaka Gorinka	Chenchu Lakshmi	1958	S. Rajeswara Rao	Vempati Sadasivabrahmam	Ghantasala	Anjali Devi	Telugu
Chilakalanchu Cheeradana	Sri Tirupatamma Katha	1964	Pamarthi	Sivaramaiah	Pithapuram Nageswara Rao		Telugu
Chilakanna Chilukave	Jayam Manade	1956	Ghantasala	Kosaraju Raghavaiah	Ghantasala	Anjali Devi	Telugu
Chiluka Elane Kopamu	Sri Krishna Maya	1958	T. V. Raju	Ravuri Rangiah	Ghantasala	Jamuna	Telugu
Chinna Chinna Veedu Katti	Marumagal	1953	C. R. Subburaman	Udumalai Narayana Kavi	A. P. Komala		Tamil
Chinna Muthu Chinna Muthu	Chinna Muthu	1994	Deva	Vairamuthu		Title Song	Tamil
Chinnanchiru Chitte	Alibabavum 40 Thirudargalum	1956	S. Dakshinamurthi	A. Maruthakasi	S. C. Krishnan	M. N. Rajam	Tamil
Chinnanchiru Vayadhu Mudhal	Thaai Magalukku Kattiya Thaali	1959	T. R. Pappa		T. M. Soundararajan	Jamuna	Tamil
Chinna Pennana Pothile	Aaravalli	1957	G. Ramanathan	A. Maruthakasi	A. M. Rajah	Mynavathi	Tamil
Chinnaridanara	Santosham	1955	Viswanathan–Ramamoorthy			Anjali Devi	Telugu
Chinnari Maradaliki Pellavutundi	Ramalayam	1971	S. Rajeswara Rao	C. Narayana Reddy	S. Janaki		Telugu
Chinnari Papayi	Palletoori Pilla	1950	P. Adinarayana Rao	Tapi Dharma Rao		Anjali Devi	Telugu
Chirunavvulu Virise	Rojulu Marayi	1955	Master Venu	Tapi Dharma Rao	Ghantasala	Sowcar Janaki	Telugu
Chitapata Chinukulu	Palletoori Pilla	1950	P. Adinarayana Rao	Tapi Dharma Rao	Pithapuram Nageswara Rao	Anjali Devi	Telugu
Chitti Potti Bommalu	Shrimantudu	1971	T. Chalapathi Rao	Dasaradhi Rangacharya	P. Susheela		Telugu
Chittu Pole Vaanagam	Illara Jothi	1954	G. Ramanathan	Kannadasan		Sriranjani	Tamil
Choosi Choosi Kallu	Bharya Bhartalu	1961	S. Rajeswara Rao	Kosaraju Raghavaiah	Ghantasala	Krishna Kumaari	Telugu
Chooda Chakkani Daana	Jayam Manade	1956	Ghantasala	Vempati Sadasivabrahmam	Ghantasala	Anjali Devi	Telugu
Chuthi Chuthi Machchane	Veera Amar Singh	1958	T. G. Lingappa	Kuyilan	A. M. Rajah	Nirupa Roy	Tamil
Come Come	Shanthi Nivasam	1960	Ghantasala	Samudrala Jr.	Ghantasala	Rajasulochana	Telugu
Come Come Shankichu	Shantinivas	1962	Ghantasala	Abhayadev	K. J. Yesudas	Rajasulochana	Malayalam
Daarithennu Kaanagada	Bratuku Teruvu	1953	Ghantasala	Samudrala Sr.		Sriranjani	Telugu
Dagudu Moothalu	Bhale Ammayilu	1957	S. Rajeswara Rao & S. Hanumantha Rao	Vempati Sadasivabrahmam		Savitri	Telugu
Deeyo Deeyo Deeyo Vannamayil Aadudhu	Kanniyin Sabatham	1958	T. G. Lingappa	A. Maruthakasi		Kumari Kamala	Tamil
Devi Radhe	Shantinivas	1962	Ghantasala	Abhayadev	P. B. Sreenivas	Rajasulochana	Malayalam
Dheedikku Dheedikku Dheedikku	Mangamma Sapatham	1965	T. V. Raju	C. Narayana Reddy	S. Janaki		Telugu
Dheerakampana	Palletoori Pilla	1950	P. Adinarayana Rao	P. Adinarayana Rao		Anjali Devi	Telugu
Dhiname Unai Ninaindhu	Mangalyam	1954	K. V. Mahadevan	Ka. Mu. Sheriff		Rajasulochana	Tamil
Din Control Ke	Mr. Sampat	1952	B. S. Kalla & Emani Sankara Sastry		P. B. Sreenivas & Geeta Dutt	Vanaja	Hindi
Donga Choopulu Choosi	Kalavari Kodalu	1964	T. Chalapathi Rao	Aarudhra	Ghantasala	Krishna Kumari	Telugu
Echu Pizhaikkum Thozhile	Madurai Veeran	1956	G. Ramanathan	Thanjai N. Ramaiah Dass	T. M. Soundararajan	Padmini	Tamil
Edhai Ketpadho	Pathu Madha Bandham	1974	Sankar Ganesh		A. M. Rajah	Rajasree	Tamil
Edhu Kitthanai.... Medhavi Pole Edhedho Pesi	Kalyanam Panniyum Brahmachari	1954	T. G. Lingappa	K. D. Santhanam	A. M. Rajah	Padmini	Tamil
Eenaati Mapata	Laila Majnu	1949	C. R. Subburaman	Samudrala Sr.	P. Leela	Padmini	Telugu
Eeroju Maa Yuvaraju	Baghdad Gaja Donga	1968	T. V. Raju	C. Narayana Reddy			Telugu
Ee Vayasu Sogasu	Sankalpam	1957	S. Dakshinamurthi	Anisetti		Rajasulochana	Telugu
Ekaandhamaam Immaalaiyil	Avan	1953	Shankar Jaikishan	Kambadasan		Nargis	Tamil
Ekaanthamu Saayantramu	Prema Lekhalu	1953	Shankar Jaikishan	Aarudhra		Nargis	Telugu
Ekkadamma Chandrudu	Ardhangi	1955	Master Venu & B. Narasimha Rao	Acharya Aatreya		Savitri	Telugu
Ekkadidi Ee Andam	Rechukka	1954	G. Aswathama	Malladi Ramakrishna Sastry		Devika	Telugu
Ellorum Innaattu Mannare	Ondrupattal Undu Vazhvu	1960	Viswanathan-Ramamoorthy	Pattukkottai Kalyanasundaram	T. M. Soundararajan & S. C. Krishnan	E. V. Saroja	Tamil
Ellorum Koodi Aadi Paadi	Amara Deepam	1956	T. Chalapathi Rao	M. K. Athmanathan		Padmini	Tamil
En Aasai Mohan Enge Amma	Pakka Thirudan	1957	T. M. Ibrahim	Mugavai Rajamanikkam		Jamuna	Tamil
En Aasai Rajan Evandaa	Veettukku Vandha Varalakshmi	1958	Pendyala Nageswara Rao		Mallik	E. V. Saroja	Tamil
En Aattaththai Paarkkaamal	Zimbo	1958	Vijaya Bhaskar	Kuyilan		Krishnakumari	Tamil
En Aavalthan ...	Manoratham	1955	M. Venkataraju		A. M. Rajah		Tamil
Enadhu Manam Kanavilum Ninaivilum	Samsaram	1951	Emani Sankara Sastry	Kothamangalam Subbu		Vanaja	Tamil
Enendru Nee Sollu Thendralae	Maaman Magal	1955	S. V. Venkatraman			Savitri	Tamil
En Munnae Vandhu Neeye	Nanban	1954	G. Ramanathan	Thanjai N. Ramaiah Dass			Tamil
En Ennam Inipatheno	Thirumanam	1958	S. M. Subbaiah Naidu & T. G. Lingappa	M. K. Athmanathan		Savitri	Tamil
Enna Enna Inbame Vaazvile Ennaazhum	Anbu	1953	T. R. Pappa		A. M. Rajah	Padmini	Tamil
Ennai Aalavanda Raja	Illarame Nallaram	1958	K. G. Moorthy	A. Maruthakasi		K. Sooryakala	Tamil
Ennamellam Eedera( Ellorume Kaana Kalyaname)	Pudhumai Penn	1959	T. G. Lingappa		A. M. Rajah	Rajasulochana	Tamil
Ennum Pothile	Inspector	1953	G. Ramanathan		A. M. Rajah	Anjali Devi	Tamil
En Pirandhaay Nee Poologam Mael	Puyal	1952	S. G. K. Pillai & P. S. Divakar	P. S. Divakar		M. V. Rajamma	Tamil
En Raajaave Idhu	Manavathi	1952	H. R. Padmanabha Sastry & B. Rajanikanta Rao	Chidambaram A. M. Nataraja Kavi		Madhuri Devi	Tamil
En Sindhai Noyum Theeruma	Kaveri	1955	G. Ramanathan	Udumalai Narayana Kavi		Padmini	Tamil
Endhan Kaadhal Kanavu Aanadhe	Kalyanam Seydhukko	1955	R. M. Ramaneekaran	Kalyan		Girija	Tamil
Endunnavo Madhavaa	Bhale Ramudu	1956	S. Rajeswara Rao	Vempati Sadasivabrahmam	K. Rani		Telugu
Enga Ooru Singappooru Thillaale Lelo	Prema Pasam	1956	S. Rajeswara Rao	Thanjai N. Ramaiah Dass		E. V. Saroja	Tamil
Engaadhe Chinna Maamaa Nee	Thiruttu Raman	1955	Pendyala Nageswara Rao	Kannadasan		Savitri	Tamil
Engalin Rani	Mannadhi Mannan	1960	Viswanathan–Ramamoorthy	A. Maruthakasi	K. Jamuna Rani	Anjali Devi	Tamil
Engi Engi	Neelamalai Thirudan	1957	K. V. Mahadevan	Thanjai N. Ramaiah Dass		Anjali Devi	Tamil
Engudhu Manasu Aasai Machan	Manaiviye Manithanin Manickam	1959	S. Hanumantha Rao	A. Maruthakasi		E. V. Saroja	Tamil
En Indha Iravu	Pudhiya Pathai	1960	Master Venu		T. M. Soundararajan	Savitri	Tamil
Ennaalum Thanniyile	Kuravanji	1960	T. R. Pappa	Thanjai N. Ramaiah Dass	A. L. Raghavan	Mynavathi	Tamil
Ennai Paaraai En Kannai Paaraai	Thangamalai Ragasiyam	1957	T. G. Lingappa	Ku. Ma. Balasubramaniam		T. R. Rajakumari	Tamil
Ennai Pole Bhagyasaali	Nalla Thangai	1955	G. Ramanathan	Ka. Mu. Sheriff	P. Leela	Madhuri Devi	Tamil
Ennathaan Kidaithaalum	Devaki	1951	G. Ramanathan		P. Leela	Madhuri Devi	Tamil
Eno Naanum Vaaduren	Pona Machaan Thirumbi Vandhan	1954	C. N. Pandurangan & M. S. Viswanathan	N. S. Chithambaram		T. D. Kusalakumari	Tamil
Eno Thaan Karvam Nenje	Magathala Nattu Mary	1957	R. Parthasarathy	Kambadasan			Tamil
Eruvaaka Sagaroranno Chinnanna	Rojulu Marayi	1955	Master Venu	Kosaraju Raghavaiah		Waheeda Rehman	Telugu
Eti Odduna Maa Vooru	Raja Makutam	1960	Master Venu			Rajasulochana	Telugu
Ezhaigal Vaazhvai Maaligai Mele	Irumanam Kalanthal Thirumanam	1960	S. Dakshinamurthi	A. Maruthakasi			Tamil
Ezhettu Naalaagathaan	Kaveri	1955	G. Ramanathan	Udumalai Narayana Kavi	N. S. Krishnan, T. A. Mathuram, A. P. Komala, A. G. Rathnamala & S. J. Kantha		Tamil
Ezhil Mevum Muhunthanai	Sabhash Ramu	1959	Ghantasala	Ku. Sa. Krishnamurthy		M. N. Rajam	Tamil
Gama Gamavena Narumanam	Samaya Sanjeevi	1957	G. Ramanathan	A. Maruthakasi	P. B. Sreenivas	N. R. Sandhya	Tamil
Ghallu... Gajjela Sangeetam	Prema Lekhalu	1953	Shankar Jaikishan	Aarudhra		Nargis	Telugu
Ghottenu Yashodhamma	Mayabazar	1957	Ghantasala & S. Rajeswara Rao		P. Leela & P. Susheela		Kannada
Godhai En Chela Kiliye	Vetri Veeran	1956	T. M. Ibrahim		Thiruchi Loganathan	Anjali Devi	Tamil
Graamathin Hridayame	Ashadeepam	1953	V. Dakshinamoorthy	P. Bhaskaran		Padmini	Malayalam
Graamathin Idhayam Peranbin	Aasai Magan	1953	V. Dakshinamoorthy	Kuyilan		Padmini	Tamil
Gulabithota	Cherapakura Chedevu	1955	Ghantasala	Samudrala Jr.		Rajasulochana	Telugu
Gummadamma Gummadamma	Vichitra Jeevitham	1978	K. Chakravarthy	Veturi Sundaramurthi	P. Susheela		Telugu
Gumthala Gummaa	Raja Makudam	1960	Master Venu	Thanjai N. Ramaiah Dass		Rajasulochana	Tamil
Gumthala Gummaa Gumaaikkadhe	Prema Pasam	1956	S. Rajeswara Rao	Thanjai N. Ramaiah Dass	Seerkazhi Govindarajan	T. P. Muthulakshmi	Tamil
Guttonkai Kooroyi Baava	Edi Nijam	1956	Master Venu			Sowcar Janaki	Telugu
Haa Imbam Kolka Naam (Bit)	Vanamala	1951	P. S. Divakar	P. Kunjikrishna Menon	Mehboob	Ammini	Malayalam
Haayigaa Teeyagaa	Bommala Pelli	1958	K. V. Mahadevan		A. M. Rajah	Jamuna	Telugu
Haayi Haayigaa Aamani Saage	Suvarna Sundari	1957	P. Adinarayana Rao	Samudrala Sr.	Ghantasala	Anjali Devi	Telugu
Haayi Viharame	Varalakshmi Vratham	1961	Rajan–Nagendra			Krishna Kumari	Telugu
Ha Ha Jayichu Poyi Njan	Visappinte Vili	1952	P. S. Divakar	Abhayadev			Malayalam
Hailelo Naa Raaja	Pelli Sandadi	1959	Ghantasala	Samudrala Jr.	P. Leela	Anjali Devi	Telugu
Hailesa Hailesa Hailesa	Ondre Kulam	1956	S. V. Venkatraman & M. V. Ranga Rao	Ku. Sa. Krishnamurthy	Seerkazhi Govindarajan, Vasantha & Sundaramma	Madhuri Devi	Tamil
Happy Happy Day	Priyuralu	1952	S. Rajeswara Rao		Ghantasala		Telugu
Hare Muraare	Aathmaarpanam	1956	V. Dakshinamoorthy	Abhayadev	A. M. Rajah		Malayalam
Hello Darling Baby	Azhagi	1953	P. R. Mani			Revathy	Tamil
Hello Darling Paranthodi Vaa	Sabhash Ramu	1959	Ghantasala	Ku. Sa. Krishnamurthy	S. C. Krishnan	Girija	Tamil
Hrudulu Rendu Okati	Veera Khadgam	1957	G. Ramanathan		Ghantasala	B. S. Saroja	Telugu
Ichatane Ichatane	Vaarasatwam	1964	Ghantasala	Aarudhra	P. Susheela	Anjali Devi	Telugu
Ichirippoovalan	Inapraavugal	1965	V. Dakshinamoorthy	Vayalar Ramavarma	Latha Raju		Malayalam
Idereeyi Kaadoyi	Pendli Pilupu	1961	K. Prasad Rao	Sri Sri	S. Janaki		Telugu
Idhaya Vaanile Udhayamaanadhe	Karpukkarasi	1957	G. Ramanathan		T. M. Soundararajan	Savitri	Tamil
Idhu Poruththamaana Vayasu	Rani Lalithangi	1957	G. Ramanathan	Thanjai N. Ramaiah Dass		E. V. Saroja	Tamil
Idhuvo Namgathi	Bommai Kalyanam	1958	K. V. Mahadevan	Udumalai Narayana Kavi		Jamuna	Tamil
Idigo Svarga Dvaram Tericharu Evaro	Akali	1952	P. S. Divakar	Devulapalli Krishnasastri	A. M. Rajah & P. Leela		Telugu
Idirakkanni	Aayisha	1964	R. K. Shekhar	Moyinkutty Vaidyar			Malayalam
Idiye Haayi Kalupumu	Rojulu Marayi	1955	Master Venu	Tapi Dharma Rao	Ghantasala	Sowcar Janaki	Telugu
Ilam Kandru Polave Ullam Thulludhe	Madana Mohini	1953	K. V. Mahadevan	M. P. Sivam		C. R. Rajakumari	Tamil
Ila Vaalibane Varavenumena	Apoorva Sakthi 369	1991	Ilaiyaraaja		S. P. Balasubrahmanyam & S. P. Sailaja	Silk Smitha	Tamil
Ilavayasu Ezhil Sokusu	Naradar Kalyanam	1959	T. V. Raju			Jamuna	Tamil
Illai Enum Solle	Sengottai Singam	1958	K. V. Mahadevan	A. Maruthakasi		B. Saroja Devi	Tamil
Illuvakili Veedi Poyadaru	Uma Sundari	1956	G. Aswathama	Vempati Sadasivabrahmam		Sriranjani	Telugu
Inbam Enna Solluven	Moondru Pillaigal	1952	P. S. Anantharaman & M. D. Parthasarathy	Kothamangalam Subbu			Tamil
Inbam Kaanben Naane	Devaki	1951	G. Ramanathan			Madhuri Devi	Tamil
Inbam Pongum	Mohana Sundaram	1951	T. G. Lingappa	K. D. Santhanam	J. P. Chandrababu	G. Sakunthala	Tamil
Inbam Tharum Naalidhe	Pudhumai Penn	1959	T. G. Lingappa	A. Maruthakasi		Rajasulochana	Tamil
Inbam Tharum Nannaal Idhe	Punniyavathi	1956	V. Dakshinamoorthy	Kanaga Surabhi		Padmini	Tamil
Inba Naalithe	Manohara	1954	S. V. Venkatraman			Kumari Kamala	Tamil
Inbam Vanthu Seruma	Naan Petra Selvam	1956	G. Ramanathan	Ka. Mu. Sheriff	T. M. Soundararajan	G. Varalakshmi	Tamil
Inbame Pongume	Bommai Kalyanam	1958	K. V. Mahadevan	Udumalai Narayana Kavi	A. M. Rajah	Jamuna	Tamil
Inda Inda Suwa	Aiyai Malli	1957					Sinhala
Indha Jegame Un Azhagaale	Jayasimman	1955	T. V. Raju			T. D. Kusalakumari	Tamil
Indha Kaala Krishnanena	Shyamala	1952	G. Ramanathan, T. V. Raju & S. B. Dinakar Rao	Kambadasan	Thiruchi Loganathan		Tamil
Indhiyaavin Raajathaani Dilli	Naan Valartha Thangai	1958	Pendyala Nageswara Rao	Pattukkottai Kalyanasundaram	A. L. Raghavan		Tamil
Indru Namathullame	Thanga Padhumai	1959	Viswanathan–Ramamoorthy	Pattukkottai Kalyanasundaram	T. M. Soundararajan	Padmini	Tamil
Ini Endrum Inbam Thaan	Rani	1952	C. R. Subburaman & D. C. Dutt	K. D. Santhanam	D. C. Dutt		Tamil
Inithaai Naame	Kaalam Maari Pochu	1956	Master Venu	Muhavai Rajamanickam	Thiruchi Loganathan	Anjali Devi	Tamil
Intha Challani Reyi	Sri Krishna Leelalu	1959	Gali Penchala Narasimha Rao				Telugu
Iravu Naadagam	Annan Ennada Thambi Ennada	1992	Gyan Varma		K. Jamuna Rani		Tamil
Iruilile Nilavoli Pol	Kumaari	1952	K. V. Mahadevan		A. M. Rajah	Sriranjani & Madhuri Devi	Tamil
Irumizhi Thannil	Aathmasakhi	1952	Br Lakshmanan	Thirunainar Kurichi Madhavan Nair			Malayalam
Iru Vizhi Parugum Virundhu	Sengottai Singam	1958	K. V. Mahadevan	A. Maruthakasi		B. Saroja Devi	Tamil
Isai Paadum Thendralodu	Vijayapuri Veeran	1960	T. R. Pappa		A. M. Rajah	M. Hemalatha	Tamil
Islaam Jin (Badarul Muneer)	Aayisha	1964	R. K. Shekhar	Moyinkutty Vaidyar & Vayalar Ramavarma	A. M. Rajah, Mehboob & P. Susheela		Malayalam
Ithikaasam Kaetteera	Pathala Bhairavi	1951	Ghantasala	Thanjai N. Ramaiah Dass		T. G. Kamala Devi	Tamil
Itthanai Naalaaga	Marma Veeran	1956	Vedha		P. Leela	Vyjayanthimala	Tamil
Ivaru Yaare	Mayabazar	1957	Ghantasala & S. Rajeswara Rao		P. Susheela		Kannada
Jaadhiyile Naanga Thaazhndhavanga	Pudhu Yugam	1954	G. Ramanathan	Ka. Mu. Sheriff	N. L. Ganasaraswathi, A. P. Komala & A. G. Rathnamala		Tamil
Jaalilo Jimkaana	Amara Deepam	1956	T. Chalapathi Rao	Thanjai N. Ramaiah Dass		Padmini	Tamil
Jaaliyaaga Yaavum	Circus Sundari	1958			A. M. Rajah		Tamil
Jaami Chettu Meeda Nunna	M.L.A.	1957	Pendyala Nageswara Rao	Aarudhra	A. M. Rajah	Savitri	Telugu
Jaanatanamunanu Nanemunanu	Stree Sahasam	1951	C. R. Subburaman	Samudrala Sr.			Telugu
Jaanavule Nerajaanavule	Aditya 369	1991	Illayaraja	Veturi Sundaramurthi	S. P. Balasubrahmanyam & S. P. Sailaja	Silk Smitha	Telugu
Jagadeeswaraa	Suvarna Sundari	1957	P. Adinarayana Rao	Samudrala Sr.		Anjali Devi	Telugu
Jagathaamba Devi Bhavaani	Naga Panchami	1956					Telugu
Jaire Jambhaire Okasari	Bhatti Vikramarka	1960	Pendyala Nageswara Rao	Anisetti	Madhavapeddi Satyam	Anjali Devi	Telugu
Jalakku Jalakku Jalakku Jalakku	Avan	1953	Shankar Jaikishan	Kambadasan		Nargis	Tamil
Jalakku Jalakku Jalakku Jalakku	Prema Lekhalu	1953	Shankar Jaikishan	Aarudhra		Nargis	Telugu
Jamakku Jamakku.... Kaadhalicha En Manasu	Pazhikku Pazhi	1955	C. N. Pandurangan				Tamil
Janani O Janani	Mayakkari	1951	P. Adinarayana Rao			Anjali Devi	Tamil
Jane Bomabay Le	Pelli Sandadi	1959	Ghantasala	Samudrala Jr.	Ghantasala & P. Leela	B. Saroja Devi	Telugu
Jarikaipattu Salasalakka	Samaya Sanjeevi	1957	G. Ramanathan	A. Maruthakasi		N. R. Sandhya	Tamil
Jeeva Theebame Thalelo	Parijatham	1950	C. R. Subburaman & S. V. Venkatraman	Kambadasan	P. Leela		Tamil
Jeevidhame Sabalamo	Anarkali	1955	P. Adinarayana Rao	Thanjai N. Ramaiah Dass		Anjali Devi	Tamil
Jeevithame Saphalamu	Anarkali	1955	P. Adinarayana Rao	Samudrala Sr.		Anjali Devi	Telugu
Jegadhaamba Devi Bavaani	Naga Panchami	1956				Anjali Devi	Tamil
Jegamadhile Oru Anaadhai	Puyal	1952	S. G. K. Pillai & P. S. Divakar	P. S. Divakar		M. V. Rajamma	Tamil
Jegam Meedhile Naam Inaiyaagave	Vazhvile Oru Naal	1956	C. N. Pandurangan, T. G. Lingappa & S. M. Subbaiah Naidu	Kavi C. A. Lakshmana Dass	T. A. Mothi	Rajasulochana	Tamil
Jeya Jeya Jeya Sri Narasimmaa	Rishyasringar	1963	T. V. Raju		P. Leela		Tamil
Jeya Veerarilum Miga Theerane	Aandi Petra Selvam	1957	S. Rajeswara Rao	Puratchidasan	T. Sathyavathi		Tamil
Jigu Jigu Jigu	Kathavarayan	1958	G. Ramanathan	Thanjai N. Ramaiah Dass	J. P. Chandrababu	M. N. Rajam	Tamil
Jigu Jigu Jinukkaa	Iru Sagodharigal	1957	S. Rajeswara Rao	Thanjai N. Ramaiah Dass		Savitri	Tamil
Jil Jil Jil Raani	Guna Sundari	1955	Ghantasala	Thanjai N. Ramaiah Dass			Tamil
Jingana Tingana	Raja Makutam	1960	Master Venu			Rajasulochana	Telugu
Kaadhalar Vaazhndha Ullaasa Vaazhvil	Thirumbi Paar	1953	G. Ramanathan	Kannadasan		Pandari Bai	Tamil
Kaadhal Ennum Kaaviyam	Vattathukkul Chaduram	1978	Ilaiyaraaja	Panchu Arunachalam		Latha	Tamil
Kaadhalin Jodi	Anarkali	1955	P. Adinarayana Rao	Thanjai N. Ramaiah Dass		Anjali Devi	Tamil
Kaadhal Kannithidum Neratthile	Iru Sagodharigal	1957	S. Rajeswara Rao	Thanjai N. Ramaiah Dass		Savitri	Tamil
Kaadhal Karumbu Kandaen	Petra Manam	1960	S. Rajeswara Rao	Kannadasan	C. S. Jayaraman	M. N. Rajam	Tamil
Kaadhal Rahasiyame	Nanban	1954	G. Ramanathan	Thanjai N. Ramaiah Dass	Thiruchi Loganathan		Tamil
Kaadhal Vaazvil Naane	Edhir Paradhathu	1954	C. N. Pandurangan	K. S. Gopalakrishnan	A. M. Rajah	Padmini	Tamil
Kaadhal Viyaadhi Polladhadhu	Thaikkupin Tharam	1956	K. V. Mahadevan	Thanjai N. Ramaiah Dass		S. Balasaraswathi	Tamil
Kaalamellaam Thanimaiyile	Manithan	1953	S. V. Venkatraman	Kanagasurabhi			Tamil
Kaalam Kettu Poche	Lavanya	1951	S. V. Venkatraman	Papanasam Sivan			Tamil
Kaallaku Gajjelu	Chenchu Lakshmi	1958	S. Rajeswara Rao	Vempati Sadasivabrahmam	P. B. Sreenivas	Anjali Devi	Telugu
Kaaman Kandu Mogam	M.L.A.	1957	Pendyala Nageswara Rao		P. B. Sreenivas	Savitri	Tamil
Kaanaga Raavaa	Chenchu Lakshmi	1958	S. Rajeswara Rao	Vempati Sadasivabrahmam	Ghantasala	Anjali Devi	Telugu
Kaanipanulu Cheste Mariyaadha	Sahasa Veerudu	1956	T. M. Ibrahim		Ghantasala	Padmini	Telugu
Kaaru Savari Joru	Vidivelli	1960	A. M. Rajah	Ku. Ma. Balasubramaniam	Thiruchi Loganathan	Padmini Priyadarshini	Tamil
Kaattu Vazhi Pogaiyile	Azhagarmalai Kalvan	1959	B. Gopalam	Puratchidasan	Thiruchi Loganathan		Tamil
Kaattilekkachyutha	Krishna Kuchela	1961	K. Raghavan	P. Bhaskaran	P. Leela		Malayalam
Kaaviya Kaadhal Vaazhvil Oviyam Naame	Gomathiyin Kaadhalan	1955	G. Ramanathan	Ku. Ma. Balasubramaniam	A. M. Rajah	Savitri	Tamil
Kaaviyam Neeye Karpanai Naane	Thirudargal Jakkirathai	1958	K. V. Mahadevan	Thanjai N. Ramaiah Dass	Ghantasala	Girija	Tamil
Kaayile Inipadhenna	Manamulla Maruthaaram	1958	K. V. Mahadevan	A. Maruthakasi	A. M. Rajah	B. Saroja Devi	Tamil
Kada Kada Loda Loda Vandi	Samsaram	1951	Emani Sankara Sastry	Kothamangalam Subbu	A. M. Rajah	Vanaja	Tamil
Kadalivaazhakayyilirunnu	Umma	1960	M. S. Baburaj	P. Bhaskaran			Malayalam
Kadal Nira Kannanadi Thozhi	Raja Sooyam	1968	S. V. Venkatraman		L. R. Eswari		Tamil
Kadhaparayamo	Chathurangam	1959	G. Devarajan	P. Bhaskaran	A. M. Rajah		Malayalam
Kadhai Kadhaiyam Kaaranamaam	Thalai Koduthaan Thambi	1959	Viswanathan-Ramamoorthy	A. Maruthakasi	A. L. Raghavan	Malini	Tamil
Kadha Parayamo Kaatte	Sthreehridayam	1960	L. P. R. Varma	P. Bhaskaran	A. M. Rajah	Ambika	Malayalam
Kadhiraadum Kazhaniyil Sadhiraadum Pennmani	Paditha Penn	1956	Arun & Raghavan	Pattukkottai Kalyanasundaram	A. M. Rajah	Rajasulochana	Tamil
Kaiyaal Aagaadha Aasaami Pole	Vazhvile Oru Naal	1956	C. N. Pandurangan, T. G. Lingappa & S. M. Subbaiah Naidu	Ku. Sa. Krishnamurthy		Rajasulochana	Tamil
Kalalu Karigipovuna	Sarangadhara	1957	Ghantasala	Samudrala Jr.	Ghantasala & Santha Kumari	Rajasulochana	Telugu
Kalangamillaa Kaadhalile	Illara Jothi	1954	G. Ramanathan	Kannadasan	A. M. Rajah	Padmini	Tamil
Kala Nijamayega	Samsaram	1950	S. Dakshinamurthi	Vempati Sadasivabrahmam			Telugu
Kalakallade Panduga	Daasi	1952	C. R. Subburaman & S. Dakshinamurthi	Acharya Aatreya	P. Leela		Telugu
Kalise Nelaraaju	Anarkali	1955	P. Adinarayana Rao	Samudrala Sr.	Ghantasala	Anjali Devi	Telugu
Kaliyaadum Poove Varoo	Ponkathir	1953	Br Lakshmanan	Thirunainar Kurichi Madhavan Nair		Lalitha	Malayalam
Kalla Kapatamerugani	Adrusta Jathakudu	1971	T. Chalapathi Rao	Dasaradhi Rangacharya	Ghantasala	Vanisri	Telugu
Kallam Kabadam Theriyadhavane	Kaalam Maari Pochu	1956	Master Venu	Muhavai Rajamanickam		Waheeda Rehman	Tamil
Kallu Terachi Kanara Satyam	Raju Peda	1954	S. Rajeswara Rao			T. D. Kusalakumari	Telugu
Kalyaanam Aagumunne Kayyaitthodal Aagumaa	Pudhu Yugam	1954	G. Ramanathan	Ka. Mu. Sheriff	Ghantasala	Krishna Kumari	Tamil
Kalyaanam Kalyaanam	Bommai Kalyanam	1958	K. V. Mahadevan	Udumalai Narayana Kavi		Jamuna	Tamil
Kalyaana Oorvalam Varum	Avan	1953	Shankar Jaikishan	Kambadasan		Nargis	Tamil
Kalyaanappudava Venam	Kathirukanakkili	1958	G. Devarajan	Vayalar Ramavarma	G. Devarajan		Malayalam
Kalyaana Vaibhavam	Sri Venkateswara Mahatyam	1960	Pendyala Nageswara Rao	Acharya Aatreya	P. Leela		Telugu
Kalyaana Vaiboga Naale	Illara Jothi	1954	G. Ramanathan	Kannadasan		Sriranjani	Tamil
Kanava Ninaiva	Pudhumai Pithan	1957	G. Ramanathan	Thanjai N. Ramaiah Dass		B. S. Saroja	Tamil
Kanavo Sol Kaadhal	Avan Amaran	1958	T. M. Ibrahim	Kambadasan	K. R. Ramasamy	Rajasulochana	Tamil
Kangalaal Kaadhal Kaaviyam	Sarangadhara	1958	G. Ramanathan	A. Maruthakasi	T. M. Soundararajan	Rajasulochana	Tamil
Kanindha Alliyodu Nilavin Oli Nee	Anarkali	1955	P. Adinarayana Rao	Thanjai N. Ramaiah Dass	Ghantasala	Anjali Devi	Tamil
Kanirasame En Kanirasame Adhirasame	Yaar Paiyyan	1957	S. Dakshinamurthi	A. Maruthakasi	Seerkazhi Govindarajan	S. Balasaraswathi	Tamil
Kanivaana Nalla Saedhi	Naga Panchami	1956				Anjali Devi	Tamil
Kaniyaa Kanniyaa Vaazhvil Inbam Sollavaa	Karpukkarasi	1957	G. Ramanathan	Udumalai Narayana Kavi	T. M. Soundararajan	E. V. Saroja	Tamil
Kan Kanathathum Manam Kandu Vidum	Avan	1953	Shankar Jaikishan	Kambadasan	A. M. Rajah	Nargis	Tamil
Kanmaniye Innamudhe Karkandu Paage	Avan Amaran	1958	T. M. Ibrahim	Ku. Ma. Balasubramaniam		Rajasulochana	Tamil
Kannaadi Kanni Neeye	Laila Majnu	1949	C. R. Subburaman	S. D. Sundharam	P. Leela	Padmini	Tamil
Kannaa Kannaa Vaaraai	Maya Manithan	1958	G. Govindarajulu Naidu	A. Maruthakasi		Chandrakantha	Tamil
Kannaa Mucchale Aaduva	Abba Aa Hudugi	1959	P. Kalinga Rao	H. L. N. Simha	Swarnalatha & T. S. Bagavathi		Kannada
Kannaalae Pesum	Gulebagavali	1955	Viswanathan–Ramamoorthy	Thanjai N. Ramaiah Dass		G. Varalakshmi	Tamil
Kannaalan Vandhiduvaar	Petra Maganai Vitra Annai	1958	Viswanathan–Ramamoorthy	A. Maruthakasi		C. R. Vijayakumari	Tamil
Kannaalane Vaarunga	Chakravarthi Thirumagal	1957	G. Ramanathan	Ku. Ma. Balasubramaniam		Ragini	Tamil
Kannaala Unnai Korinen Naane	Mannan Magal	1959	B. Gopalam		K. Rani		Tamil
Kannaa Maraiyaadhedaa	Pennin Perumai	1956	A. Rama Rao & B. Narasimha Rao	Thanjai N. Ramaiah Dass		Savitri	Tamil
Kannaana En Raajaa Nee Vaaraai	Illarame Inbam	1956	Ghantasala			Rajasulochana	Tamil
Kannaana Kaadhalar Kaaleju Manavar	Edhir Paradhathu	1954	C. N. Pandurangan	Kanaga Surabhi		Padmini	Tamil
Kannaana Naadhan Ennaaginaano	Naga Panchami	1956				Anjali Devi	Tamil
Kannaa Pesum Kannaa	Veettu Mappillai	1973	A. M. Rajah	Vaali	P. Susheela	Prameela	Tamil
Kannaa Vedan Engu Ponaan	Paanai Pidithaval Bhaagyasaali	1958	S. V. Venkatraman & S. Rajeswara Rao				Tamil
Kannai Pol Thannai Kaakkum	Naan Sollum Ragasiyam	1959	G. Ramanathan	A. Maruthakasi		Anjali Devi	Tamil
Kannai Thirandhu Kaanadaa	Aandi Petra Selvam	1957	S. Rajeswara Rao	Kuyilan			Tamil
Kannanai Kaanane Kaanane	Aandi Petra Selvam	1957	S. Rajeswara Rao	Puratchidasan	T. Sathyavathi		Tamil
Kannazhagi Ennaipol Yaarundu	Vilayattu Bommai	1954	T. G. Lingappa	K. P. Kamatchisundharam		E. V. Saroja	Tamil
Kanne Entho Sundari	Bhagya Rekha	1957	Pendyala Nageswara Rao	Devulapalli Krishnasastri		E. V. Saroja	Telugu
Kanneer Sindhaadhe Kavalai Kollaadhe	Avan Amaran	1958	T. M. Ibrahim	A. Maruthakasi		Rajasulochana	Tamil
Kannemaavi Thotalona	Ammalakkalu	1953	C. R. Subburaman & Viswanathan–Ramamoorthy	Samudrala Jr.	Swarnalatha		Telugu
Kannepilla Sogasu Choodu	Bhatti Vikramarka	1960	Pendyala Nageswara Rao	AnAnisetti		Anjali Devi	Telugu
Kannil Kandaalum Sugam Tharum Veeran	Thiruttu Raman	1955	Pendyala Nageswara Rao	Kanaga Surabhi		Savitri	Tamil
Kannil Therindhum Kaikku Varaadha	Kaanal Neer	1961	Master Venu		P. Bhanumathi	Devika	Tamil
Kannil Thondrum Kaatchi Yaavum	Sugam Enge	1954	Viswanathan–Ramamoorthy	Kannadasan	K. R. Ramasamy	Savitri	Tamil
Kannil Vandhu Minnal Pol	Nadodi Mannan	1958	S. M. Subbaiah Naidu	Pattukottai Kalyanasundaram	T. M. Soundararajan	B. Saroja Devi	Tamil
Kannirandum Kavi Paadum	Thirudargal Jakkirathai	1958	K. V. Mahadevan	Thanjai N. Ramaiah Dass		Girija	Tamil
Kann Koduththadhu Pole	Kavalai Illaadha Manithan	1960	Viswanathan–Ramamoorthy	Kannadasan	T. M. Soundararajan	L. Vijayalakshmi	Tamil
Kannoda Kannu Kalandhaachu	Nadodi Mannan	1958	S. M. Subbaiah Naidu	Pattukkottai Kalyanasundaram		B. Saroja Devi	Tamil
Kannu Kannu Kalipi	Vijayakota Veerudu	1958	C. Ramachandra		P. Leela	Vyjayanthimala	Telugu
Kannukkulle Minnalaadudhu	Maya Manithan	1958	G. Govindarajulu Naidu	A. Maruthakasi		Helen	Tamil
Kannulalo Vennelalo	Manohara	1954	S. V. Venkatraman		A. M. Rajah	Girija	Telugu
Kannum Kannum Kalanthu	Vanjikottai Valiban	1958	C. Ramachandra	Kothamangalam Subbu	P. Leela	Vyjayanthimala	Tamil
Kannukkazhagaa Pengalai	Aval Yaar	1959	S. Rajeswara Rao	V. Seetharamamm	T. V. Rathnam		Tamil
Kani Suvai Tharum Amudhaave	Singari	1951	S. V. Venkatraman, T. R. Ramanathan & T. A. Kalyanam	Thanjai N. Ramaiah Dass	Thiruchi Loganathan	Padmini	Tamil
Kanulakudoche Chetikandani	Batasari	1961	Master Venu	Samudrala Sr.	P. Bhanumathi	Devika	Telugu
Karuvande Katti Karkande	Kanavu	1954	G. Ramanathan & V. Dakshinamoorthy	A. Maruthakasi		Lalitha	Tamil
Kasthoori Ranga Ranga	Annadata	1954	P. Adinarayana Rao	P. Adinarayana Rao	M. S. Padma	Anjali Devi	Telugu
Kasthoori Ranga Ranga	Karpin Jothi	1957	P. Adinarayana Rao	P. Adinarayana Rao	Pazhani Bhagirathi	Anjali Devi	Tamil
Kataragama	Asoka	1955	P. L. A. Somapala	Karunaratne Abeysekera	Dharmadasa Walpola		Sinhala
Kattandi Veera Kankanam	Veera Kankanam	1957	S. Dakshinamurthi	Aarudhra	A. M. Rajah	Jamuna	Telugu
Kazhani Engum Sathiraadum	Thirumanam	1958	S. M. Subbaiah Naidu & T. G. Lingappa	Pattukkottai Kalyanasundaram	A. L. Raghavan	Savitri	Tamil
Kizhakku Ninnoru Pennuvannu	Avar Unarunnu	1956	V. Dakshinamoorthy	Vayalar Ramavarma		Miss Kumari	Malayalam
Kodai Idi Kaatru	Manamagan Thevai	1957	G. Ramanathan		A. M. Rajah	Devika	Tamil
Kodala Oka Maata	Premanuraagam	1999	Ram Lakshman	Vennelakanti	V. Ramakrishna, Mano & K. S. Chithra		Telugu
Koduththup Paar Paar Paar	Vidivelli	1960	A. M. Rajah	A. Maruthakasi	A. M. Rajah, Thiruchi Loganathan & P. Susheela	Padmini Priyadarshini	Tamil
Kokara Kokarako Sevale	Pathi Bakthi	1958	Viswanathan–Ramamoorthy	Pattukkottai Kalyanasundaram	T. M. Soundararajan	M. N. Rajam	Tamil
Kolam Podum Penn Iva	Mudhal Manaivi	1994	Gnanadevan	Gnanadevan	Malaysia Vasudevan	Chithra	Tamil
Kommulu Thirigina Magavaru	Bhatti Vikramarka	1960	Pendyala Nageswara Rao	Anisetti		Anjali Devi	Telugu
Konaatha Marathinile... Onne Onnu	Petra Maganai Vitra Annai	1958	Viswanathan–Ramamoorthy	Thanjai N. Ramaiah Dass	Seerkazhi Govindarajan, Thiruchi Loganathan & P. Susheela	Kumari Rajamani	Tamil
Konda Meeda	Bhakta Raghunath	1960	Ghantasala		J. V. Raghavulu	Jamuna	Telugu
Kondapalli Bomma Laaga	Kumkuma Rekha	1960	Master Venu	Kosaraju Raghavaiah		Daisy Irani	Telugu
Konjam Kooda Kuri Thavaraadhu .. Thenamudham	Pennarasi	1955	K. V. Mahadevan	A. Maruthakasi		E. V. Saroja	Tamil
Konjum Mozhi Pengalukku	Neelamalai Thirudan	1957	K. V. Mahadevan	A. Maruthakasi		Anjali Devi	Tamil
Koodu Sellum Paravaigalae	Kangal	1953	S. V. Venkatraman			Padmini	Tamil
Koovudhu Koovudhu Seval Koovudhu	Pennin Perumai	1956	A. Rama Rao & B. Narasimha Rao	Thanjai N. Ramaiah Dass	P. Leela		Tamil
Kottu Melam Kottungadi	Sivagangai Seemai	1959	Viswanathan–Ramamoorthy	Kannadasan		Kumari Kamala	Tamil
Krishna Prabho Maya Leela	Maya Manithan	1958	G. Govindarajulu Naidu	A. Maruthakasi		Chandrakantha	Tamil
Kudakkalla Kimpuma	Nadodi Mannan	1958	S. M. Subbaiah Naidu	Narayanababu			Telugu
Kulasala Sarasala	Anarkali	1955	P. Adinarayana Rao	Samudrala Sr.		Anjali Devi	Telugu
Kuliridhe Suvai Madhu	Laila Majnu	1949	C. R. Subburaman	S. D. Sundharam	P. Leela	Padmini	Tamil
Kunkumathin Pottukuthi	Naadodikal	1959	V. Dakshinamoorthy	P. Bhaskaran		Ambika	Malayalam
Kurumbaai Ennai Paarkkaadhe	Magudam Kaattha Mangai	1957	K. V. Mahadevan	A. Maruthakasi		Padmini	Tamil
Kutthu Kummangu Koyyaa	Vanangamudi	1957	G. Ramanathan	Thanjai N. Ramaiah Dass		Helen	Tamil
Laai Lalla Laai Lalla .. Uruludhu Peraludhu	Petra Maganai Vitra Annai	1958	Viswanathan–Ramamoorthy	Pattukottai Kalyanasundaram	K. Jamuna Rani		Tamil
Laa Ilaaha	Subaidha	1965	M. S. Baburaj	P. Bhaskaran	P. Susheela		Malayalam
Laali Laali Kanne Thaalelo	Niraparadhi	1951	Ghantasala & H. R. Padmanabha Sastri	M. S. Subramaniam		Anjali Devi	Tamil
Laatteriyaale Battri Polave	Iru Sagodharigal	1957	S. Rajeswara Rao	Thanjai N. Ramaiah Dass	Thiruchi Loganathan	T. P. Muthulakshmi	Tamil
Lahari Lahari Lahari	Bharya	1962	G. Devarajan	Vayalar	A. M. Rajah	Rajasree	Malayalam
Lalalee Lalalee Azhagin Arbuthame	Kumaari	1952	K. V. Mahadevan	M. P. Sivam		Madhuri Devi	Tamil
Lambaadi Lambaadi Hoi Lambaadi	Chenchu Lakshmi	1958	S. Rajeswara Rao		Madhavapeddi Satyam	Anjali Devi	Tamil
La Sokkaa Potta Navaabu	Gulebakavali	1955	Viswanathan-Ramamoorthy	Thanjai N. Ramaiah Dass		E. V. Saroja	Tamil
Levoyi Chinnavada	Donga Ramudu	1955	Pendyala Nageswara Rao	Samudrala Sr.		Savitri	Telugu
Lol Lol Lol Machchan Unna Parthu	Paasavalai	1956	Viswanathan-Ramamoorthy	Pattukkottai Kalyanasundaram		Kumari Rajamani	Tamil
Loo Ambalamey	Jeevitha Satana	1957	Vedha	D. T. Fernando			Sinhala
Maadhaa En Meedhu Karunai Illaiyaa	Naga Panchami	1956				Anjali Devi	Tamil
Maalaa Maalaa	Snehadeepam	1962	M. B. Sreenivasan	P. Bhaskaran	Renuka	Ambika	Malayalam
Maalai Neram Vandhathu Paaru	Naan Valartha Thangai	1958	Pendyala Nageswara Rao	Pattukkottai Kalyanasundaram		Helen	Tamil
Maalai Sooduven Magizhvaai Aaduven	Naane Raja	1956	T. R. Ramanathan	Kavi C. A. Lakshmana Dass		Girija	Tamil
Maalaiyidhe Nalla Verlaiyidhe	Marumalarchi	1956	Pendyala Nageswara Rao	M. S. Subramaniam	A. M. Rajah		Tamil
Maamaa Maamaa Pannaadai	Petra Maganai Vitra Annai	1958	Viswanathan-Ramamoorthy	A. Maruthakasi		C. R. Vijayakumari	Tamil
Maamalar Thoovida	Rani	1952	C. R. Subburaman & D. C. Dutt	Ku. Sa. Krishnamurthy	C. R. Subburaman & S. Balachander		Tamil
Maamogam Aanaen	Ratha Paasam	1954	M. K. Athmanathan & A. V. Natarajan			Vidhyavathi	Tamil
Maanai Thedi Macchaan Varaporaaan	Nadodi Mannan	1958	S. M. Subbaiah Naidu	Pattukottai Kalyanasundaram		B. Saroja Devi	Tamil
Maanai Thedi Vandhavare	Sri Valli	1961	G. Ramanathan	Thanjai N. Ramaiah Dass			Tamil
Maanasa Vedana	Bhakta Kuchela	1961	Br Lakshmanan	Thirunainar Kurichi Madhavan Nair			Malayalam
Maanatthai Kaappadhu Ponnu	Mallika	1957	T. R. Pappa	A. Maruthakasi	S. C. Krishnan	M. N. Rajam	Tamil
Maanathe Ezhunilamaalikayil	Rebecca	1963	K. Raghavan	Vayalar	A. M. Rajah	Rajasree	Malayalam
Maancholai Thannile.... Aasai Mugam Maarinadho	Paanai Pidithaval Bhaagyasaali	1958	S. V. Venkatraman & S. Rajeswara Rao			Savitri	Tamil
Maaraju Vianavayya	Rojulu Marayi	1955	Master Venu	Tapi Dharma Rao	Ghantasala	Sowcar Janaki	Telugu
Maarindi Maarindi Mana Raajakeyame	Raju Peda	1954	S. Rajeswara Rao			T. D. Kusalakumari	Telugu
Maarivilloli	Ashadeepam	1953	V. Dakshinamoorthy	P. Bhaskaran		Padmini	Malayalam
Maariye Kelamma	Kaalam Maari Pochu	1956	Master Venu	Muhavai Rajamanickam	Thiruchi Loganathan	Anjali Devi	Tamil
Maarumaa Manam Emaarumaa	Thirudargal Jakkirathai	1958	K. V. Mahadevan	Thanjai N. Ramaiah Dass		Girija	Tamil
Mabbula Chaatuna	Irugu Porugu	1963	Master Venu	Aarudhra		Krishna Kumari	Telugu
Madhana O Madhana	Bhaktha Jayadeva	1960	S. Rajeswara Rao	Samudrala Sr.	A. M. Rajah		Telugu
Madhavel Thanaiye	Pathala Bhairavi	1951	Ghantasala	Thanjai N. Ramaiah Dass			Tamil
Madhu Nilai Maaraadha .. Gaanatthaale Kaadhalaaginene	Koteeswaran	1955	S. V. Venkatraman	Thanjai N. Ramaiah Dass		Padmini	Tamil
Madhu Patram	Illarikam	1959	T. Chalapathi Rao	Aarudhra			Telugu
Madhuramaay.... Krishna Mukunda Vanamaali	Bhakta Kuchela	1961	Br Lakshmanan	Thirunainar Kurichi Madhavan Nair			Malayalam
Madhuvidhuvin	Sthreehridayam	1960	L. P. R. Varma	P. Bhaskaran		Ambika	Malayalam
Makkalai Petra Maharasi	Makkalai Petra Magarasi	1957	K. V. Mahadevan	A. Maruthakasi		Title Song	Tamil
Malai Naattu Kuravar Naanga	Sri Valli	1961	G. Ramanathan	Thanjai N. Ramaiah Dass		Helen	Tamil
Malar Poongavinile Vanthu Ondraay Kooti	Gnana Soundari	1948	S. V. Venkatraman			Baby Rajamani	Tamil
Malaril Madhu Edharkku	Kalathur Kannamma	1960	R. Sudharsanam	M. K. Athmanathan		L. Vijayalakshmi	Tamil
Malarum Manamum Poliruppom	Thanthaikku Pin Thamaiyan	1960	K. V. Mahadevan	Velsamy Kavi	A. L. Raghavan	Mynavathi	Tamil
Malligai Poochendai Paaratthaan	Mangaikku Maangalyame Pradhaanam	1960	Jeevan	Puratchidasan	A. M. Rajah	Advani Lakshmi Devi	Tamil
Manadhukku Theriyum Ennai	Enakkoru Magan Pirappaan	1975	A. M. Rajah		A. M. Rajah	Shubha	Tamil
Manam Aadudhu Paadudhu	Punar Janmam	1961	T. Chalapathi Rao	A. Maruthakasi	S. Janaki	Ragini	Tamil
Manam Naadum Dheivam Neeye	Anbu	1953	T. R. Pappa	Ka. Mu. Sheriff		Padmini	Tamil
Manamagizh (Musical drama)	Parijatham	1950	C. R. Subburaman & S. V. Venkatraman	K. D. Santhanam	K. V. Janaki	Padmini	Tamil
Mana Magizhndhen	Jaya Gopi	1955	Viswanathan–Ramamoorthy	Kannadasan	A. P. Komala		Tamil
Manam Ariyaadha Peraanandham	Marumalarchi	1956	Pendyala Nageswara Rao	M. S. Subramaniam	A. P. Komala		Tamil
Manam Pola Vaazhvu Peruvome	Manthiri Kumari	1950	G. Ramanathan		M. L. Vasanthakumari	Madhuri Devi	Tamil
Manam Polave	Kalyanam Seydhukko	1955	R. M. Ramaneekaran	Kalyan	A. V. Saraswathi	Girija	Tamil
Maname Nirantha Deivam Enaiye	Maheswari	1955	G. Ramanathan		A. M. Rajah	Savithri	Tamil
Manamudan Naalum	Annaiyum Pithavum Munnari Dheivam	1959	T. V. Raju	Kuyilan		B. Saroja Devi	Tamil
Manasaina Vaada	Inti Guttu	1958	M. S. Prakash	Malladi Ramakrishna Sastry	Pithapuram Nageswara Rao	Savitri	Telugu
Manassamatham Thannaatte	Bharya	1962	G. Devarajan	Vayalar	A. M. Rajah	Rajasree	Malayalam
Manasa Nenevaro Neeku Thelusa	Pelli Chesi Choodu	1952	Ghantasala	Pingali Nagendrarao		G. Varalakshmi	Telugu
Manase Dhochukune	Minor Raja	1992	Vidyasagar	Jaladi Raja Rao	V. Ramakrishna		Telugu
Manchaadikkilimaina	Kattuthulasi	1965	M. S. Baburaj	Vayalar	K. J. Yesudas	Sharada	Malayalam
Manjalum Thanthaal	Thenum Paalum	1971	M. S. Viswanathan	Kannadasan	S. Janaki	Padmini	Tamil
Mangai Endhan Manadhil Inbam	Chenchu Lakshmi	1958	S. Rajeswara Rao		Ghantasala	Anjali Devi	Tamil
Mangili Rangammaa	Vikramaadhithan	1962	S. Rajeswara Rao	Clown Sundaram	Seerkazhi Govindarajan		Tamil
Mannai Nambi Maram Irukka	Engal Veettu Mahalakshmi	1957	Master Venu	K. S. Gopalakrishnan	S. C. Krishnan	Rajasulochana	Tamil
Mannulagellam Ponnulagaga	Uthama Puthiran	1958	G. Ramanathan	A. Maruthakasi	P. Susheela	Ragini	Tamil
Manoraajyathu (Badarul Muneer)	Aayisha	1964	R. K. Shekhar	Vayalar Ramavarma	A. M. Rajah, Mehboob & P. Susheela		Malayalam
Maradala Maradala	Varakatnam	1969	T. V. Raju	Kosaraju Raghavaiah	P. Susheela	Krishna Kumari	Telugu
Marapurani Manchi	Chenchu Lakshmi	1958	S. Rajeswara Rao	Vempati Sadasivabrahmam	Ghantasala	Anjali Devi	Telugu
Maratthil Eruvaayaa Ye Singga Manadhil	Chenchu Lakshmi	1958	S. Rajeswara Rao		Ghantasala	Anjali Devi	Tamil
Mata Aalookey Gena	Aiyai Malli	1957					Sinhala
Mathanaa Ezhil Raja	Chella Pillai	1955	R. Sudarsanam	Ku. Ma. Balasubramaniam	K. R. Ramasamy (Dialogues)	Savitri	Tamil
Mattamaana Pechu	Maganey Kel	1965	Viswanathan-Ramamoorthy	Pattukkottai Kalyanasundaram	A. L. Raghavan		Tamil
Mayakkum Maalai	Gulebagavali	1955	K. V. Mahadevan	Vindhan	A. M. Rajah	G. Varalakshmi	Tamil
Mazhai Megam Kaanaamal	Verum Pechu Alla	1956	C. N. Pandurangan	A. Maruthakasi	A. M. Rajah		Tamil
Mera Kahan Hai Man Wo To	Gulebakavali	1956	Gyan Dutt	Pyarelal Santoshi	Talat Mahmood	G. Varalakshmi	Hindi
Mey Herrdaye Mawadey	Aiyai Malli	1957					Sinhala
Miga Ullaasamaaga Pengal	Naga Panchami	1956				Anjali Devi	Tamil
Minnalai Pole En Kaadhal	Kaithi	1951	S. Balachander	K. D. Santhanam			Tamil
Minnuvadhellam Ponnendru Enni	Gomathiyin Kaadhalan	1955	G. Ramanathan	K. D. Santhanam	Seerkazhi Govindarajan	Savitri	Tamil
Mrogimpave Hrudaya Veena	Anna Thammudu	1958	G. Aswatthama	B.V.N.Acharya		Sowcar Janaki	Telugu
Mullai Malar Pol	Azhagi	1953	P. R. Mani			Revathy	Tamil
Mullai Poo Manakkuthu	Naan Vanangum Dheivam	1963	K. V. Mahadevan		A. L. Raghavan	Ragini	Tamil
Mukoorttha Naaum Mudivaachchaa	Pennin Perumai	1956	A. Rama Rao & B. Narasimha Rao	Thanjai N. Ramaiah Dass		Savitri	Tamil
Mungi Mungi	Kadalamma	1963	G. Devarajan	Vayalar Ramavarma	S. Janaki		Malayalam
Murali Gaanam Idenaa	Santhanam	1955	S. Dakshinamurthi	Anisetti – Pinisetti		Savitri	Telugu
Murali Ganam Ithe Than	Santhanam	1955	S. Dakshinamurthi	Kuyilan		Savitri	Tamil
Ammaa Paaramma Arul Mevumamma	Santhanam	1956	S. Dakshinamurthi	Kuyilan		Savitri	Tamil
My Dear Meena	Mangalya Balam	1959	Master Venu	Sri Sri	Madhavapeddi Satyam	Rajasulochana	Telugu
My Dear Meena	Manjal Mahimai	1959	Master Venu	Udumalai Narayana Kavi	S. C. Krishnan	Rajasulochana	Tamil
Naadagamellam Kanden	Madurai Veeran	1956	G. Ramanathan	Kannadasan	T. M. Soundararajan	Padmini	Tamil
Naadakamantha Chooste	Sahasa Veerudu	1956	T. M. Ibrahim	Sri Sri	T. M. Soundararajan	Padmini	Telugu
Naageenu Baala	Sarangadhara	1957	Ghantasala	Samudrala Jr.		Rajasulochana	Telugu
Naalae Nalla Naalae	Puyal	1952	S. G. K. Pillai & P. S. Divakar	P. S. Divakar		M. V. Rajamma	Tamil
Naalumozhikuravayumaay	Kattuthulasi	1965	M. S. Baburaj	Vayalar Ramavarma		Sharada	Malayalam
Naa Manasantaa Teesuko	Irugu Porugu	1963	Master Venu	Aarudhra		Krishna Kumari	Telugu
Naa Manasentho	Nithya Kalyanam Paccha Thoranam	1960	Pendyala Nageswara Rao			Krishna Kumari	Telugu
Naa Manasu Navvanela	Mangalasutram	1966	T. Chalapathi Rao	Daasarathi Krishnamacharyulu			Telugu
Naan En Varavendum	Poongothai	1953	P. Adinarayana Rao		D. B. Ramachandran	Anjali Devi	Tamil
Naan Kaanbeno Sodhariyaale	Devaki	1951	G. Ramanathan		P. Leela	Madhuri Devi	Tamil
Naan Kannda Sugamaa Sugamaa	Anarkali	1955	P. Adinarayana Rao	Thanjai N. Ramaiah Dass		Anjali Devi	Tamil
Naa Priyaa	Vaddante Dabbu	1954	T. A. Kalyanam	Devulapalli Krishnasastri		Jamuna	Telugu
Naan Raani	Zimbo	1958	Vijaya Bhaskar	Kuyilan		Krishnakumari	Tamil
Naan Unnai Nenaichchen	Kannil Theriyum Kathaikal	1980	Sankar Ganesh	Vaali	S. P. Balasubrahmanyam & Vani Jairam	Sripriya	Tamil
Naan Vazhndhathum	Vidivelli	1960	A. M. Rajah	Kannadasan		M. N. Rajam	Tamil
Naarigaa Naayanaa	Raju Peda	1954	S. Rajeswara Rao		T. Sathyavathi		Telugu
Naa Vayasu Naa Sogasu	Sri Krishna Maya	1958	T. V. Raju	Ravuru		Jamuna	Telugu
Nademaina Pachabottu	Bhale Ramudu	1956	S. Rajeswara Rao	Vempati Sadasivabrahmam		E. V. Saroja	Telugu
Naadhanin Aasi Kavara Vandhaaye	Naga Panchami	1956				Anjali Devi	Tamil
Nalla Kaaril Erikondu	Manam Pola Mangalyam	1953	A. Rama Rao	Kanaga Surabhi		Savitri	Tamil
Nallamalaa Yellamala	Stree Sahasam	1951	C. R. Subburaman	Samudrala Sr.			Telugu
Nalla Nalla Sevai Naattuku Thevai	Porter Kandan	1955	Viswanathan–Ramamoorthy	Azha. Valliyappa		Baby Uma	Tamil
Nalla Ninnu Suttu	Rathna Manjari	1962	Rajan–Nagendra	Hunsur Krishnamurthy		Rajasree	Kannada
Nallanivadena	Sri Krishna Pandaveeyam	1966	T. V. Raju	Samudrala Sr.	L. R. Eswari		Telugu
Nalla Thamilzh Vilakke	Ellorum Vazhavendum	1962	Rajan-Nagendra	Villiputhan	A. M. Rajah	Malini	Tamil
Namma Dravidare Kulage	Nadodi Mannan	1958	S. M. Subbaiah Naidu	Vijaya Narasimha			Kannada
Nam Thirunaal	Arasala Piranthavan	1958	Nallam Nageswara Rao		T. M. Soundararajan	Sriranjani	Tamil
Nanu Kanugonuma	Anarkali	1955	P. Adinarayana Rao	Samudrala Sr.		Anjali Devi	Telugu
Nannu Pendladave	Penki Pellam	1956	K. Prasad Rao	Aarudhra	A. M. Rajah	Rajasulochana	Telugu
Navaneedha Soranum Endru	Pillai Kaniyamudhu	1958	K. V. Mahadevan	A. Maruthakasi		M. N. Rajam	Tamil
Navaneetha Chorudu Nandha Kishorudu	Krishna Prema	1961	Pendyala Nageswara Rao		S. Varalakshmi	Jamuna	Telugu
Navaneetha Chorudu Nandha Kishorudu (pathos)	Krishna Prema	1961	Pendyala Nageswara Rao		S. Varalakshmi	Jamuna	Telugu
Nedu Naamanasu Uyyalaloogene	Edi Nijam	1956	Master Venu			Sowcar Janaki	Telugu
Nee Korake Nee Korake	Aada Pettanam	1958	S. Rajeswara Rao & Master Venu	Kosaraju Raghavaiah	Ghantasala	Anjali Devi	Telugu
Neeku Purtigaa Telusunugaa	Prema Lekhalu	1953	Shankar Jaikishan	Aarudhra		Nargis	Telugu
Neela Kangalai	Rani	1952	C. R. Subburaman & D. C. Dutt	K. D. Santhanam	D. C. Dutt		Tamil
Nee Leela Lanni	Inti Guttu	1958	M. S. Prakash	Malladi Ramakrishna Sastry		Savitri	Telugu
Nee Shoku Choodakunda	Thodi Kodallu	1957	Master Venu	Kosaraju Raghavaiah	Madhavapeddi Satyam	Rajasulochana	Telugu
Nee Thaane Ennasai	Laila Majnu	1949	C. R. Subburaman	S. D. Sundharam	Ghantasala, P. Bhanumathi & P. Leela		Tamil
Neevene Naa Chaduvu	Laila Majnu	1949	C. R. Subburaman	Samudrala Sr.	Ghantasala, P. Bhanumathi & P. Leela		Telugu
Nela Nadimi Vennela Haayi	Jayasimha	1955	T. V. Raju	Samudrala Jr.		T. D. Kusalakumari	Telugu
Nellukkulle Arisi Irupadhu Avasiyam	Manamulla Maruthaaram	1958	K. V. Mahadevan	A. Maruthakasi		B. Saroja Devi	Tamil
Nenenduku Raavaali	Paradesi	1953	P. Adinarayana Rao	Malladi Venkata Krishna Sharma	Pithapuram Nageswara Rao	Anjali Devi	Telugu
Nenjil Theeyaai Indru	Arabu Naattu Azhagi	1961	Vijaya Bhaskar	Kuyilan			Tamil
Nenu Needa Nera	Varalakshmi Vratham	1961	Rajan–Nagendra				Telugu
Nerampoyi Nadanada	Seetha	1960	V. Dakshinamoorthy	Abhayadev	V. Dakshinamoorthy		Malayalam
Nerchevu Sarasalu Chala	Sati Sakkubai	1965	P. Adinarayana Rao		S. Janaki	Vanisri	Telugu
Nilaiyaadha Thunbam Nehrndhathinaale	Madana Mohini	1953	K. V. Mahadevan	M. P. Sivam		C. R. Rajakumari	Tamil
Nilave Nilave Odaathe	Thai Ullam	1952	V. Nagayya & A. Rama Rao	Kanaga Surabhi		Madhuri Devi	Tamil
Ninaithaal Inikkum	Vidivelli	1960	A. M. Rajah	A. Maruthakasi		Padmini Priyadarshini	Tamil
Ninaitthathu Yaro	Paattukku Oru Thalaivan	1989	Ilaiyaraaja	Gangai Amaran	Mano	Shobana	Tamil
Ninaive Avar Ninaive	Vazhvile Oru Naal	1956	C. N. Pandurangan, T. G. Lingappa & S. M. Subbaiah Naidu	T. K. Sundhara Vathiyar	T. A. Mothi	Rajasulochana	Tamil
Ninnu Ckhoosamu	Bhakta Ambareesha	1959	L. Malleswara Rao		S. Janaki		Telugu
Ninugaana Sambarana	Anarkali	1955	P. Adinarayana Rao	Samudrala Sr.		Anjali Devi	Telugu
Ninne Pelladesthanantu	Ninne Pelladata	1996	Sandeep Chowta	Sirivennela Seetharama Sastry	Sowmya, V. Ramakrishna, Saandip, Rajesh & Balaram	Lakshmi	Telugu
Ninnu Nenu Maruvalenura	Mana Desam	1949	Ghantasala	Samudrala Sr.			Telugu
Nithyasahaaya Naadhe	Umma	1960	M. S. Baburaj	P. Bhaskaran			Malayalam
Nivewaravo Chiru Nawulato	Prema Lekhalu	1953	Shankar Jaikishan	Aarudhra	A. M. Rajah	Nargis	Telugu
O Aiyaa Daa Daa	Magudam Kaattha Mangai	1957	K. V. Mahadevan	A. Maruthakasi		Padmini	Tamil
O Aiyaa O Ammaa	Marma Veeran	1956	Vedha	A. Maruthakasi	J. P. Chandrababu, K. Rani & S. C. Krishnan	Vyjayanthimala	Tamil
O Chigurakulalo Chilakamma	Donga Ramudu	1955	Pendyala Nageswara Rao	Samudrala Sr.	Ghantasala	Savitri	Telugu
O Chinni Bavaa	Manchi Manasuku Manchi Rojulu	1958	Ghantasala	Samudrala Jr.		Girija	Telugu
O Devadhaa	Devadasu	1953	C. R. Subburaman	Udumalai Narayana Kavi	Ghantasala	Savithri	Telugu
O Devadhas	Devadas	1953	C. R. Subburaman	Udumalai Narayana Kavi	Ghantasala	Savithri	Tamil
O Mouna Raagam	Prema Pichchi	1981	Ilaiyaraaja	Rajasri		Deepa	Telugu
Oho Bangaru Chilaka	Bhale Ammayilu	1957	S. Rajeswara Rao & S. Hanumantha Rao	Kosaraju Raghavaiah		Savitri	Telugu
Oho Basthi Dorasani	Abhimanam	1960	Ghantasala	Aarudhra	Ghantasala	Savitri	Telugu
Oho Endhan Raajaa	Thanthaikku Pin Thamaiyan	1960	K. V. Mahadevan	Velsamy Kavi		Mynavathi	Tamil
Ohoho Inta Challani Vela	Parivartana	1953	T. Chalapathi Rao	Anisetti			Telugu
Oho Maharaja	Batasari	1961	Master Venu	Samudrala Sr.		Devika	Telugu
Oh Oru Jeevithame	Marumakal	1952	P. S. Divakar	Abhayadev	K. Prasad Rao		Malayalam
O Katti Karumbe	Puyal	1952	S. G. K. Pillai & P. S. Divakar	P. S. Divakar		M. V. Rajamma	Tamil
O Malliyakka O Rojakka	Makkalai Petra Magarasi	1957	K. V. Mahadevan	Pattukkottai Kalyanasundaram	K. Jamuna Rani & A. G. Rathnamala	Subbulakshmi	Tamil
Om Endra Pranavatthin.... Kalli Malai	Bhoologa Rambai	1958	C. N. Pandurangan	P. K. Atkondan	Thiruchi Loganathan, S. C. Krishnan & A. G. Rathnamala	Rajasulochana	Tamil
O Mister Baalu	Thirudadhe	1961	S. M. Subbaiah Naidu	Ku. Ma. Balasubramaniam		M. N. Rajam	Tamil
O Mohgana Sendhaamaraiye	Magudam Kaattha Mangai	1957	K. V. Mahadevan		T. A. Mothi	Padmini	Tamil
O Nigarillaadha	Chella Pillai	1955	R. Sudarsanam			Savitri	Tamil
O Saila Sutha Mataa	Bhatti Vikramarka	1960	Pendyala Nageswara Rao	Anisetti		Anjali Devi	Telugu
O Sakha Oho Sakha Neevedano	Sati Anasuya	1957	Ghantasala		Ghantasala		Telugu
O Sippaayi.... Anbe Nee Vaaraayo	Anarkali	1955	P. Adinarayana Rao	Thanjai N. Ramaiah Dass		Anjali Devi	Tamil
O Sipaayi	Anarkali	1955	P. Adinarayana Rao	Samudrala Sr.		Anjali Devi	Telugu
O Siruchaalaiyil Or Kuyilamma	Thiruttu Raman	1955	Pendyala Nageswara Rao	Kannadasan	Ghantasala	Savitri	Tamil
Ondrupattal Undu Vazhvu	Ondrupattal Undu Vazhvu	1960	Viswanathan-Ramamoorthy	Pattukkottai Kalyanasundaram	T. M. Soundararajan	E. V. Saroja	Tamil
Ondu Goodide	Nanda Deepa	1963	M. Venkataraju	Sorat Ashwath	Pithapuram Nageswara Rao		Kannada
Onne Onnu Irukku	Kuravanji	1960	T. R. Pappa			Mynavathi	Tamil
Onnum Onnum Serndhaaka	Alli Petra Pillai	1959	K. V. Mahadevan	A. Maruthakasi	Seerkazhi Govindarajan	B. Saroja Devi	Tamil
Oogave Uyyala	Maa Gopi	1954	Viswanathan-Ramamoorthy				Telugu
Oonjalil Oyyaara Ullaasam	Jaya Gopi	1955	Viswanathan-Ramamoorthy	Kannadasan			Tamil
Oorengum Thaedinaen	Then Nilavu	1961	A. M. Rajah	Kannadasan		Vasanthi	Tamil
Oru Kaattum Kaattalla	Avar Unarunnu	1956	V. Dakshinamoorthy	Vayalar	A. M. Rajah		Malayalam
Oru Muraithaan Varum	Mangaiyar Thilakam	1955	S. Dakshinamurthi	Kannadasan		M. N. Rajam	Tamil
Oru Naal Idhu Oru Naal	Anbukkor Anni	1960	A. M. Rajah	Kannadasan	A. M. Rajah	Mynavathi	Tamil
Oruvan Orutthi	Veettukku Vandha Marumagal	1973	Shankar Ganesh	Kannadasan	A. M. Rajah	Vennira Aadai Nirmala	Tamil
Othayadi Paadhayile	Aatha Un Koyilile	1991	Deva	Kalidasan		Kasthuri	Tamil
Othayadi Paadhayile	Aatha Un Koyilile	1991	Deva	Kalidasan	S. P. Balasubrahmanyam	Kasthuri	Tamil
Otrumaiye Namakku Uyir Naadi	Neelavukku Neranja Manasu	1958	K. V. Mahadevan	A. Maruthakasi	Soolamangalam Rajalakshmi	M. N. Rajam	Tamil
Ottu Maambazhathai Pole	Naan Valartha Thangai	1958	Pendyala Nageswara Rao	Thanjai N. Ramaiah Dass	S. C. Krishnan		Tamil
O Vayyari	Tiger Ramudu	1962	Ghantasala	Samudrala Jr.	Ghantasala	Rajasulochana	Telugu
Oyilu Kummi Podalaam Ullaasamaai	Chenchu Lakshmi	1958	S. Rajeswara Rao		P. S. Vaidehi & T. Sathyavathi	Anjali Devi	Tamil
Paadam Sariyaa Master	Punar Janmam	1961	T. Chalapathi Rao	Subbu. Arumugam	Thiruchi Loganathan	Ragini	Tamil
Paadave Preyasi Teeyagaa	Manohara	1954	S. V. Venkatraman		T. A. Mothi	P. K. Saraswathi	Telugu
Paadoo Maanasame	Ponkathir	1953	Br Lakshmanan	Thirunainar Kurichi Madhavan Nair		Lalitha	Malayalam
Paadu Pattu Payir Valartthu	Pattaliyin Vetri	1960	S. Rajeswara Rao & Master Venu	Ka. Mu. Sheriff	T. M. Soundararajan	Savitri	Tamil
Paarthanile Mudivu Kannden	Anarkali	1955	P. Adinarayana Rao	Thanjai N. Ramaiah Dass		Anjali Devi	Tamil
Paattaali Makkalin Sevai	Pudhumai Penn	1959	T. G. Lingappa	Pattukottai Kalyanasundaram		Rajasulochana	Tamil
Pachchai Kilipaadudhu	Amara Deepam	1956	T. Chalapathi Rao	A. Maruthakasi		Padmini	Tamil
Pachchaiyilum Neeyum Pachcha	Petra Maganai Vitra Annai	1958	Viswanathan-Ramamoorthy	Thanjai N. Ramaiah Dass	Seerkazhi Govindarajan	T. P. Muthulakshmi	Tamil
Pahath Thenin Yai Gala	Jeevitha Satana	1957	Vedha	D. T. Fernando			Sinhala
Pambaramai Aadalaam	Maya Bajaar	1957	Ghantasala & S. Rajeswara Rao		P. Susheela		Tamil
Pana Waage Loo	Aiyai Malli	1957					Sinhala
Panditlo Pellauthunadhi	Prema Lekhalu	1953	Shankar Jaikishan	Aarudhra		Nargis	Telugu
Pannodu Pirandhadu	Vidivelli	1960	A. M. Rajah	Kannadasan	P. B. Sreenivas	M. N. Rajam	Tamil
Pantapolalalo Egire Jantha	Sonta Ooru	1956	Ghantasala		Ghantasala	Sowcar Janaki	Telugu
Parama Jaanavara	Shivasharane Nambekka	1955	T. G. Lingappa				Kannada
Paraman Arulai Perum Maargamaa	Kalyanam Panniyum Brahmachari	1954	T. G. Lingappa	K. D. Santhanam		Padmini	Tamil
Parandhu Parandhu Enggum Thiriyum	Thaai Magalukku Kattiya Thaali	1959	T. R. Pappa		A. Nithyakala		Tamil
Pattu Poochchi Polum Raani	Aval Yaar	1959	S. Rajeswara Rao	Vidwan Lakshmanan	A. M. Rajah		Tamil
Pedhavula Ragam	Panduranga Mahatyam	1957	T. V. Raju	Samudrala Jr.		B. Saroja Devi	Telugu
Pem Sihiney	Jeevitha Satana	1957	Vedha	D. T. Fernando	Mohideen Baig		Sinhala
Pengalinaal	Manthiri Kumari	1950	G. Ramanathan	A. Maruthakasi		Madhuri Devi	Tamil
Pengal Mattum Illai	Devaki	1951	G. Ramanathan			Madhuri Devi	Tamil
Penne Unadhazhagai Kandu	Paanai Pidithaval Bhaagyasaali	1958	S. V. Venkatraman & S. Rajeswara Rao		Thiruchi Loganathan		Tamil
Pennillaa Oorile Pirandhu	Illara Jothi	1954	G. Ramanathan	Kannadasan		Sriranjani	Tamil
Perazhagi Premai Kalairani	Magudam Kaattha Mangai	1957	K. V. Mahadevan		K. Jamuna Rani	Padmini	Tamil
Pesum Yazhe Pen Mane	Naam	1953	C. S. Jayaraman	M. Karunanidhi	A. M. Rajah	V. N. Janaki	Tamil
Pesum Yaazhe Penn Maane	Naam	1953	C. S. Jayaraman	M. Karunanidhi		V. N. Janaki	Tamil
Podhum Sarithaan Mister	Punar Janmam	1961	T. Chalapathi Rao	Subbu. Arumugam	P. B. Sreenivas	Ragini	Tamil
Podu Dakku Mukku Dakku Thaalam	Rambaiyin Kaadhal	1956	T. R. Pappa	A. Maruthakasi	S. C. Krishnan		Tamil
Ponaa Varaadhu Idhu	Vaazhkai Oppandham	1959	Ghantasala	Thanjai N. Ramaiah Dass			Tamil
Pon Meni Kaatti Unai	Naane Raja	1956	T. R. Ramanathan	Bharathidasan		Girija	Tamil
Ponnai Thedi Varuvaar	Senthamarai	1962	Viswanathan–Ramamoorthy	Kannadasan	L. R. Eswari & L. R. Anjali		Tamil
Ponvandu Pudhu Poovai	Pirandha Naal	1962	K. V. Mahadevan	A. Maruthakasi			Tamil
Poolamma Poolu	Banda Ramudu	1959	S. Dakshinamurthi & N. D. V. Prasada Rao			Savitri	Telugu
Poomalai Ondru	Pathu Madha Bandham	1974	Sankar Ganesh		P. Susheela	Rajasree	Tamil
Poomala Vittodiyirangiya	Achanum Makanum	1956	Vimal Kumar	P. Bhaskaran	A. M. Rajah		Malayalam
Poovaa Manamum Pootthadhu	Naan Petra Selvam	1956	G. Ramanathan	Ka. Mu. Sheriff	T. M. Soundararajan	G. Varalakshmi	Tamil
Poovanippoykayil	Manthravadi	1956	Br Lakshmanan	Thirunainar Kurichi Madhavan Nair		Kumari Thankam	Malayalam
Poove Nalla Poove	Palattu Koman	1962	M. S. Baburaj	Vayalar Ramavarma	P. Leela & Santha P. Nair		Malayalam
Poovodu Kaathu Vanthu	Dharmam Vellum	1989	Ilaiyaraaja	Gangai Amaran	Ilaiyaraaja	Sujatha	Tamil
Poraadum Vanmai	Rani	1952	C. R. Subburaman & D. C. Dutt	Ku. Sa. Krishnamurthy	C. R. Subburaman		Tamil
Prajakalundo Prajakalundo	Seetha	1960	V. Dakshinamoorthy	Abhayadev	A. M. Rajah, P. B. Sreenivas, Punitha		Malayalam
Premada Preetiya Poojari	Bhaagyachakra	1956	Vijaya Bhaskar		A. M. Rajah		Kannada
Premaiyinaale Naanum	Puyal	1952	S. G. K. Pillai & P. S. Divakar	P. S. Divakar	Mehboob	M. V. Rajamma	Tamil
Prema Janga	Anarkali	1955	P. Adinarayana Rao	Samudrala Sr.		Anjali Devi	Telugu
Prema Tamaashaa	Vachina Kodalu Nachindi	1959	S. Dakshinamurthi	Acharya Aatreya	Ghantasala	Jamuna	Telugu
Pudhu Azhagai Rasikka Varum	Aval Yaar	1959	S. Rajeswara Rao	Pattukkottai Kalyanasundaram	P. B. Sreenivas		Tamil
Pudhu Ulaga Sirpigal Naame	Kalyanam Panniyum Brahmachari	1954	T. G. Lingappa	K. D. Santhanam		Padmini	Tamil
Pudhu Yugam, Pudhu Yugam	Pudhu Yugam	1954	G. Ramanathan	A. Maruthakasi	P. Leela		Tamil
Pulakinchani Madi	Pelli Kanuka	1960	A. M. Rajah	Aarudhra		Krishna Kumari	Telugu
Punnagai Thanai Veesi	Kaalam Maari Pochu	1956	Master Venu	Muhavai Rajamanickam	Thiruchi Loganathan & K. Rani	Anjali Devi	Tamil
Puttaloni Nagamma	Varakatnam	1969	T. V. Raju	C. Narayana Reddy	P. Susheela		Telugu
Raagadhe Naa Mohini	Veera Prathap	1958	G. Ramanathan & T. Chalapathi Rao		Pithapuram Nageswara Rao, T. G. Kamala Devi & S. Janaki	Helen	Telugu
Raaga Sudharasa	Missamma	1955	S. Rajeswara Rao	Tyagaraja	P. Leela	Jamuna	Tamil
Raajaadhi Raajaa	Sreerama Pattabhishekam	1962	Br Lakshmanan	Thirunainar Kurichi Madhavan Nair	A. P. Komala & P. S. Vaidehi	Miss Kumari	Malayalam
Raajakumari [Badarul Muneer]	Aayisha	1964	R. K. Shekhar	Vayalar Ramavarma	A. M. Rajah, Mehboob & P. Susheela		Malayalam
Raajasegara En Mel	Anarkali	1955	P. Adinarayana Rao	Thanjai N. Ramaiah Dass	Ghantasala	Anjali Devi	Tamil
Raajasekhara Neepaai	Anarkali	1955	P. Adinarayana Rao	Samudrala Sr.	Ghantasala	Anjali Devi	Telugu
Raaju Neevoy	Inti Guttu	1958	M. S. Prakash	Malladi Ramakrishna Sastry		Savitri	Telugu
Raaju Peda	Palletooru	1952	Ghantasala		P. Leela		Telugu
Raaka Raaka Vachchadu	Ardhangi	1955	Master Venu & B. Narasimha Rao	Acharya Aatreya		Savitri	Telugu
Raa Raa Maaraa Kumaraa	Kanakadurga Pooja Mahima	1960	Rajan–Nagendra			Krishna Kumari	Telugu
Raaroyi Maa Intiki	Donga Ramudu	1955	Pendyala Nageswara Rao	Samudrala Sr.		Savitri	Telugu
Raariro Raarariro	Umma	1960	M. S. Baburaj	P. Bhaskaran			Malayalam
Raasi Nalla Raasi	Veettu Mappillai	1973	A. M. Rajah	Vaali	A. M. Rajah	Prameela	Tamil
Raatthiri Pootthadhu Kaattu Roja	Dhayam Onnu	1988	Ilayaraaja	Gangai Amaran		Silk Smitha	Tamil
Raave Raave	Veera Kankanam	1957	S. Dakshinamurthi	Aarudhra	Ghantasala	Jamuna	Telugu
Raave Raave Jaabili	Sobha	1958	A. M. Rajah	P. Vasanth Kumar Reddy		Anjali Devi	Telugu
Raave Radha Rani Raave	Shanthi Nivasam	1960	Ghantasala	Samudrala Jr.	Ghantasala	Rajasulochana	Telugu
Raavoyi Raavoyi	Manohara	1954	S. V. Venkatraman			Kumari Kamala	Telugu
Raavoyi Sakhaa	Anarkali	1955	P. Adinarayana Rao	Samudrala Sr.		Anjali Devi	Telugu
Rammante Vachaaru Ammaayi Garu	Atha Okinti Kodale	1958	Pendyala Nageswara Rao		P. B. Sreenivas	Girija	Telugu
Rarada Madi Ninne	Prema Lekhalu	1953	Shankar Jaikishan	Aarudhra	A. M. Rajah	Nargis	Telugu
Regina Aasa	Charana Daasi	1956	S. Rajeswara Rao	Samudrala Sr.		Savitri	Telugu
Roopai Kasulone	Santosham	1955	Viswanathan–Ramamoorthy			Anjali Devi	Telugu
Saira Saira Thimmannaa	Atha Okinti Kodale	1958	Pendyala Nageswara Rao		Pithapuram Nageswara Rao		Telugu
Sakuntala (Natakam)	Mahakavi Kalidasu	1960	Pendyala Nageswara Rao	Kalidasa	Ghantasala		Telugu
Salaam Baabu	Alibabavum 40 Thirudargalum	1956	S. Dakshinamurthi	A. Maruthakasi		Waheeda Rehman	Tamil
Samayamidi Dayera Sarasuda	Pelli Sandadi	1959	Ghantasala	Samudrala Jr.	P. Leela	B. Saroja Devi	Telugu
Sandhosham Kollame Saapaadum Illaame	Kaveri	1955	G. Ramanathan	Udumalai Narayana Kavi		Padmini	Tamil
Sangeetham Paadi Sandhosham	Thangam Manasu Thangam	1960	K. V. Mahadevan	A. Maruthakasi	Seerkazhi Govindarajan	C. R. Vijayakumari	Tamil
Santhosham Veno	Jailppulli	1957	Br Lakshmanan	Thirunainar Kurichi Madhavan Nair		Miss Kumari	Malayalam
Sariyaa Theinjaa Savaal Vidu	Kalaivaanan	1959	Pendyala Nageswara Rao	Pattukkottai Kalyanasundaram	T. M. Soundararajan	Anjali Devi	Tamil
Seemaangalum Komaangalum	Aandi Petra Selvam	1957	S. Rajeswara Rao	Kuyilan			Tamil
Seivom Ippave Kalyaanam	Manthiri Kumaran	1963	Rajan-Nagendra	Puratchidasan	S. C. Krishnan		Tamil
Selvame Chithirame Poondhere	Pangali	1992	Ilaiyaraaja				Tamil
Sendhamizh Naattu Solaiyile	Sugam Enge	1954	Viswanathan-Ramamoorthy	A. Maruthakasi	K. R. Ramasamy	Savitri	Tamil
Sendhamizh Naattu Solaiyile (Bit)	Sugam Enge	1954	Viswanathan-Ramamoorthy	A. Maruthakasi	K. R. Ramasamy	Savitri	Tamil
Sen Thamaraiye	Puhuntha Veedu	1972	Sankar Ganesh	Vichithra	A. M. Rajah	Chandrakala	Tamil
Shramadi Naav Dudidhu	Vathsalya	1965	Vijaya Krishnamurthy	Sorat Aswath	P. B. Sreenivas	Leelavathi	Kannada
Singaara Bommai	Pattaliyin Vetri	1960	S. Rajeswara Rao & Master Venu	Ka. Mu. Sheriff	S. C. Krishnan	Girija	Tamil
Singaara Poongavil Aaduvome	Soubhagyavathi	1957	Pendyala Nageswara Rao & M. S. Gnanamani	Pattukottai Kalyanasundaram		Savitri	Tamil
Singaara Sangeethame	Neelavukku Neranja Manasu	1958	K. V. Mahadevan	A. Maruthakasi	Soolamangalam Rajalakshmi & A. G. Rathnamala	M. N. Rajam	Tamil
Singaara Thoppile Chellakkili Tholile	Meenda Sorgam	1960	T. Chalapathi Rao		S. Janaki		Tamil
Singakutti Andha Thangakatti	Sengottai Singam	1958	K. V. Mahadevan	A. Maruthakasi		B. Saroja Devi	Tamil
Siricha Podhum Sinnanchiru Ponnu	Baghdad Thirudan	1960	G. Govindarajulu Naidu	A. Maruthakasi		M. N. Rajam	Tamil
Sirikkiran Moraikkiran	Neelamalai Thirudan	1957	K. V. Mahadevan	Thanjai N. Ramaiah Dass	T. M. Soundararajan	Anjali Devi	Tamil
Siri Siri Hayi	Stree Sahasam	1951	C. R. Subburaman	Samudrala Sr.			Telugu
Sirpi Sedhukkaadha Porchilaiye	Edhir Paradhathu	1954	C. N. Pandurangan	K. P. Kamatchisundharam		Padmini	Tamil
Sirunagai Valar	Jaya Gopi	1955	Viswanathan–Ramamoorthy	Kannadasan			Tamil
Sivakaama Sundhari.... Kanani Endhan Kaadhal Un Arulaal	Kaveri	1955	G. Ramanathan	Udumalai Narayana Kavi		Padmini	Tamil
Siva Siva Moorthivi Gananatha	People's Encounter	1991	M. M. Keeravani				Telugu
Sokkum Mozhiyaale	Vikramaadhithan	1962	S. Rajeswara Rao	Puratchidasan			Tamil
Solla Venuma	Vijayapuri Veeran	1960	T. R. Pappa		A. M. Rajah	M. Hemalatha	Tamil
Somarulaithe Thindiki Nashtam	Sahasa Veerudu	1956	T. M. Ibrahim		P. Susheela	Ragini	Telugu
Sogasari Kuluku	Veera Kankanam	1957	S. Dakshinamurthi	Aarudhra		Jamuna	Telugu
Sri Hari Dheva Jegame Pugazh Jeeva	Chenchu Lakshmi	1958	S. Rajeswara Rao		Ghantasala	Anjali Devi	Tamil
Srimantulu Demantulu	Raju Peda	1954	S. Rajeswara Rao				Telugu
Sudhdham Seyyanum	Singari	1951	S. V. Venkatraman, T. R. Ramanathan & T. A. Kalyanam	Kannadasan		Padmini	Tamil
Sugam Varuvadhu	Aval Yaar	1959	S. Rajeswara Rao	Pattukkottai Kalyanasundaram			Tamil
Sumabaana Bidu Mouna	Rathnagiri Rahasya	1957	T. G. Lingappa	Kanagal Prabhakara Shastry		Sowcar Janaki	Kannada
Summa Kidanthaa Sothukku Kashtam	Madurai Veeran	1956	G. Ramanathan	Udumalai Narayana Kavi	P. Leela	Lalitha	Tamil
Summa Saappida Vaanga	Iru Sagodharigal	1957	S. Rajeswara Rao	Thanjai N. Ramaiah Dass		Savitri	Tamil
Sundara Mey Veekaraley	Jeevitha Satana	1957	Vedha	D. T. Fernando	Mohideen Baig		Sinhala
Swagatham Swagatham Bhaktha Kuchela	Krishna Kuchela	1961	K. Raghavan	P. Bhaskaran	P. Leela & Santha P. Nair		Malayalam
Taku Taku Tamakula Bandi	Samsaram	1950	S. Dakshinamurthi	Vempati Sadasivabrahmam	Ghantasala		Telugu
Tea Tea Soodaana Tea	Devaki	1951	G. Ramanathan		A. G. Rathnamala	Lalitha	Tamil
Thaalelo Kanne	Rani	1952	C. R. Subburaman	K. D. Santhanam			Tamil
Thaam Thaam Thirinam	Irumanam Kalanthal Thirumanam	1960	S. Dakshinamurthi	A. L. Narayanan			Tamil
Thaane Thandhaanane	Kathavarayan	1958	G. Ramanathan	Thanjai N. Ramaiah Dass		E. V. Saroja	Tamil
Thaaragai Solaiyile Vennilaave	Guna Sundari	1955	Ghantasala	Thanjai N. Ramaiah Dass	K. Rani	Lakshmi Prabha	Tamil
Thaiyathaan Thaan Thimithaan	Dharma Devatha	1952	C. R. Subburaman		Relangi	Girija	Tamil
Thallini Minchina	Abhimanam	1960	Ghantasala	Sri Sri		Savitri	Telugu
Thallithalli Oh Vellam	Vanamala	1951	P. S. Divakar	P. Kunjikrishna Menon		Ammini	Malayalam
Thandhaana Thaana Thaanaa.... Senthaazham Poo	Annaiyin Aanai	1958	S. M. Subbaiah Naidu	K. S. Gopalakrishnan	A. G. Rathnamala		Tamil
Thanga Nilavil	Thirumanam	1958	S. M. Subbaiah Naidu & T. G. Lingappa	Kannadasan	A. M. Rajah	Savitri	Tamil
Thanga Thalir Meni	Maya Manithan	1958	G. Govindarajulu Naidu	A. Maruthakasi		Sukumari	Tamil
Thanjaavoor Bommai Pole	Pudhiya Pathai	1960	Master Venu	A. Maruthakasi		Daisy Irani	Tamil
Thanmanamae Nilai Dhaan Vaeraanaal	Puyal	1952	S. G. K. Pillai & P. S. Divakar	P. S. Divakar		M. V. Rajamma	Tamil
Thalai Vaazhai Ilai	Naan Yen Pirandhen	1972	Shankar Ganesh	Vaali	S. Janaki	Kanchana	Tamil
Thavajeevitha Santhosham	Marumakal	1952	P. S. Divakar	Abhayadev			Malayalam
Thavare Purindhu Pinnaal	Pudhu Yugam	1954	G. Ramanathan	A. Maruthakasi			Tamil
Thaye Nee Kan Paarai	Mallika	1957	T. R. Pappa			Padmini	Tamil
Thaaye Ninnarul Thaal Kadhi Endre	Bale Raman	1956	T. A. Kalyanam	Kanaga Surabhi		Sriranjani	Tamil
Teerenu Korika Teeya Teeyaga	Kumkuma Rekha	1960	Master Venu		Ghantasala	Savitri	Telugu
Teeyani Eenati Reyi	Santosham	1955	Viswanathan–Ramamoorthy		G. K. Venkatesh	Anjali Devi	Telugu
Thela Thelavaare	Manohara	1954	S. V. Venkatraman			T. R. Rajakumari	Telugu
Thela Thelavarenu Levandamma	Nammina Bantu	1960	S. Rajeswara Rao & Master Venu	Kosaraju Raghavaiah		Savitri	Telugu
Theli Theli Naa Manasu	Veera Kankanam	1957	S. Dakshinamurthi	Aarudhra	Ghantasala	Jamuna	Telugu
Thendral Vandhu Vilaiyaadum	Samaya Sanjeevi	1957	G. Ramanathan	A. Maruthakasi		N. R. Sandhya	Tamil
Then Idhazh Meley	Mathar Kula Manickam	1956	S. Rajeswara Rao	Thanjai N. Ramaiah Dass		Savitri	Tamil
Then Kuyil Pole Isaipaadum	Pudhu Vazhvu	1957	G. Ramanathan & C. N. Pandurangan		M. K. Thyagaraja Bhagavathar	Madhuri Devi	Tamil
Then Malar Poigayin Inabame Naan	Manthravadi	1956	Br Lakshmanan	Kalyan		Kumari Thankam	Tamil
Thennale Nee Parayumo	Manthravadi	1956	Br Lakshmanan	Thirunainar Kurichi Madhavan Nair	Kamukara Purushothaman	Kumari Thankam	Malayalam
Then Pole Thedi Vaa	Bhoologa Rambai	1958	C. N. Pandurangan	Ku. Ma. Balasubramaniam		B. Saroja Devi	Tamil
Then Venduma Illai Naan Venduma	Thalai Koduthaan Thambi	1959	Viswanathan-Ramamoorthy	Pattukottai Kalyanasundaram		Malini	Tamil
Thikku Theriyaadha Kaattil	Paanai Pidithaval Bhaagyasaali	1958	S. V. Venkatraman & S. Rajeswara Rao	Mahakavi Subramanya Bharathiyar			Tamil
Thillaanaa Paattu Paadi	Pudhumai Pithan	1957	G. Ramanathan	Thanjai N. Ramaiah Dass	J. P. Chandrababu	E. V. Saroja	Tamil
Thirai Potu Naame	Raja Rani	1956	T. R. Pappa	A. Maruthakasi	A. M. Rajah	Padmini	Tamil
Thirumanam.... Naalum Paartthaacchu	Thirumanam	1958	S. M. Subbaiah Naidu & T. G. Lingappa	Kannadasan	P. Leela & A. P. Komala		Tamil
Thiruve En Deviye	Kokilavani	1956	G. Ramanathan	A. Maruthakasi	Seerkazhi Govindarajan	Tambaram Lalitha	Tamil
Thiruvilakku Veettuku Alankaaram	Manamulla Maruthaaram	1958	K. V. Mahadevan	A. Maruthakasi		Kamini	Tamil
Thiruvilakku Veettuku Alankaaram (Bit)	Manamulla Maruthaaram	1958	K. V. Mahadevan	A. Maruthakasi		B. Saroja Devi	Tamil
Thulli Thulli Oduthe	Meenda Sorgam	1960	T. Chalapathi Rao			Padmini	Tamil
Thumbu Yavvana	Rathna Manjari	1962	Rajan-Nagendra	Hunsur Krishnamurthy		Rajasree	Kannada
Thogai Inge Megam Ange	Thaai Magalukku Kattiya Thaali	1959	T. R. Pappa	Kannadasan		Jamuna	Tamil
Thogai Mayil Odaiyile.... Thenaruvi Paadhaiyile	Sengottai Singam	1958	K. V. Mahadevan	Velsamy Kavi	T. M. Soundararajan	Mynavathi	Tamil
Thoodhu Sellum Kogilam	Guna Sundari	1955	Ghantasala	Thanjai N. Ramaiah Dass	K. Rani	Lakshmi Prabha	Tamil
Thottatthu Rojaa Malarndhadhu Raajaa	Mangalyam	1954	K. V. Mahadevan	Ka. Mu. Sheriff		Rajasulochana	Tamil
Thudikkum Yauvanam	Aaravalli	1957	G. Ramanathan			Mynavathi	Tamil
Thullaadha Manamum Thullum	Kalyana Parisu	1959	A. M. Rajah	Pattukkottai Kalyanasundaram		C. R. Vijayakumari	Tamil
Thulli Thulli Odum En	Petra Manam	1960	S. Rajeswara Rao	K. P. Kamatchisundharam		M. N. Rajam	Tamil
Thulliye Odum Pulli Maan Polae	Ondre Kulam	1956	S. V. Venkatraman & M. V. Ranga Rao	Ku. Sa. Krishnamurthy		Madhuri Devi	Tamil
Thunai Yaarum	Aasai	1956	T. R. Pappa			Padmini	Tamil
Thunbam Soozhum Neram	Amara Deepam	1956	T. Chalapathi Rao	K. S. Gopalakrishnan		Padmini	Tamil
Thuyar Soozhndha Vaazhvile	Inspector	1953	G. Ramanathan				Tamil
Town Pakkakelloddura	Thodi Kodallu	1957	Master Venu	Kosaraju Raghavaiah	Ghantasala	E. V. Saroja	Telugu
Ulaavudhe Joraai	Illarame Inbam	1956	Ghantasala			Rajasulochana	Tamil
Ulagam Pugazhum Ezhil	Kokilavani	1956	G. Ramanathan	A. Maruthakasi		Tambaram Lalitha	Tamil
Ulagathukae Unavalikkum	Parijatham	1950	C. R. Subburaman & S. V. Venkatraman	Kambadasan	S. V. Venkatraman		Tamil
Ulavum Thendral	Manthiri Kumari	1950	G. Ramanathan	A. Maruthakasi	Thiruchi Loganathan	Madhuri Devi	Tamil
Ullam Irandum Ondru	Pudhumai Pithan	1957	G. Ramanathan	Thanjai N. Ramaiah Dass	C. S. Jayaraman	B. S. Saroja	Tamil
Ullam Kollai Pogudhe	Neelamalai Thirudan	1957	K. V. Mahadevan	A. Maruthakasi		Anjali Devi	Tamil
Ullam Thulli Vilayaadi	Vanamala	1951	P. S. Divakar	P. Kunjikrishna Menon		Ammini	Malayalam
Ullatthai Urukkum Vanappu	Pakka Thirudan	1957	T. M. Ibrahim	Ku. Sa. Krishnamurthy		E. V. Saroja	Tamil
Umaa Deviye Un Arulaal	Naga Panchami	1956				Anjali Devi	Tamil
Unaal Naanee Uyirai Marandhen	Anarkali	1955	P. Adinarayana Rao	Thanjai N. Ramaiah Dass		Anjali Devi	Tamil
Unakkum Enakkum Uravu Kaatti	Illara Jothi	1954	G. Ramanathan	Kannadasan		Padmini	Tamil
Undhan Sabaiyil Endhan Vidhiyai	Akbar	1961	Naushad	Kambadasan	P. Susheela	Madhubala	Tamil
Unnaale Vandhenaiyaa	Allavudeenum Arputha Vilakkum	1957	S. Rajeswara Rao & S. Hanumantha Rao	A. Maruthakasi			Tamil
Undhan Kaadhal	Magudam Kaattha Mangai	1957	K. V. Mahadevan			Padmini	Tamil
Unnai Ninaikka Ninaikka	Manidhanum Mirugamum	1953	G. Govindarajulu Naidu	S. D. Sundharam	T. R. Ramachandran		Tamil
Unnaiyallaal Thunai Yaramma	Inspector	1953	G. Ramanathan				Tamil
Un Perai Ketten Thendralthanil Naan	Avan	1953	Shankar Jaikishan	Kambadasan		Nargis	Tamil
Uruvaagumunne Kulaindhe	Inspector	1953	G. Ramanathan		A. M. Rajah		Tamil
Uttharavu Kodungo	Manavathi	1952	H. R. Padmanabha Sastry & B. Rajanikanta Rao	Chidambaram A. M. Nataraja Kavi		Madhuri Devi	Tamil
Uyirillaamal Ulaginile	Thozhan	1960	G. Ramanathan	A. Maruthakasi	Seerkazhi Govindarajan	P. V. Narasimha Bharathi & Madhuri Devi	Tamil
Vaadudhe En Manam	Puyal	1952	S. G. K. Pillai & P. S. Divakar	P. S. Divakar	Mehboob	M. V. Rajamma	Tamil
Vaadugindra Ezhai .. Mannil Veezhndhum	Panam Paduthum Padu	1954	T. A. Kalyanam			Jamuna	Tamil
Vaana Jallu Kurisindhi	Sampoorna Ramayanam	1974	K.V. Mahadevan				Telugu
Vaana Villena Vandhu Kaadhalin	Aasai Magan	1953	V. Dakshinamoorthy	Kuyilan		Padmini	Tamil
Vaangaiyaa Vaanga	Meendum Vazhven	1971	M. S. Viswanathan	Kannadasan	L. R. Eswari	Vijaya Lalitha	Tamil
Vaanil Kaanum Nilave	Aasai	1956	T. R. Pappa		A. M. Rajah	Padmini	Tamil
Vaanil Nilavile	Jameenthaar	1952	G. Ramanathan		A. M. Rajah		Tamil
Vaanmadhi Nee Arivaai	Avan Amaran	1958	T. M. Ibrahim	Ku. Ma. Balasubramaniam	Seerkazhi Govindarajan	Rajasulochana	Tamil
Vaanmadhi Yaagiye Naam Ulaavalaam	Maya Mohini	1956	T. Chalapathi Rao	Thanjai N. Ramaiah Dass	A. M. Rajah	Shakila	Tamil
Vaaraai Nee Vaaraai	Manthiri Kumari	1950	G. Ramanathan	A. Maruthakasi	Thiruchi Loganathan	Madhuri Devi	Tamil
Vaaraai Sukumaaraa Yen Manadhil	Gruhalakshmi	1955	B. S. Kalla, Sarala, T. A. Kalyanam & G. Nataraj	Guhan		Bombay Meenakshi	Tamil
Vaaraai Thaaraai Neeye Raani	Dharma Devatha	1952	C. R. Subburaman		C. R. Subburaman	Girija	Tamil
Vaaraai Vaaraai En Manohara	Ezhai Uzhavan	1952	H. R. Padmanabha Sastri	Kavi C. A. Lakshmana Dass	A. M. Rajah		Tamil
Vaarunga Ammaa Maare	Athisaya Thirudan	1958	S. Dakshinamurthi & K. Prasad Rao	Thanjai N. Ramaiah Dass		Savitri	Tamil
Vaarungal Vaarungalen Maamo	Thiruttu Raman	1955	Pendyala Nageswara Rao	Kannadasan		Savitri	Tamil
Vaasamigum Malar Cholaiyile	Yaar Paiyyan	1957	S. Dakshinamurthi	A. Maruthakasi	A. M. Rajah	Savithri	Tamil
Vaayendru Sonnadhum Vandhaaye	Mamiyarum Oru Veetu Marumagale	1961	Pendyala Nageswara Rao	A. Maruthakasi	Seerkazhi Govindarajan	M. N. Rajam	Tamil
Vaazhga Engal Ponnaadu	Raja Desingu	1960	G. Ramanathan		P. Leela	T. D. Kusalakumari	Tamil
Vaazhvellam Inbam Tharum	Aasai	1956	T. R. Pappa		K. Jamuna Rani	Rita	Tamil
Vaazhvinile ... Pala Maarudhal Thaan	Vazha Pirandhaval	1953	G. Ramanathan & S. Rajeswara Rao	Ka. Mu. Sheriff			Tamil
Vaazhvin Oliye Varuvaai	Kalyanam Seydhukko	1955	R. M. Ramaneekaran	Kalyan	Seerkazhi Govindarajan	Girija	Tamil
Vachchanu Nee Kosame	Allauddin Adhbhuta Deepam	1957	S. Rajeswara Rao & S. Hanumantha Rao	Aarudhra		Rajasulochana	Telugu
Vachcha Pulliyum Thavaraadhu	Raja Makudam	1960	Master Venu	Thanjai N. Ramaiah Dass		Rajasulochana	Tamil
Vagalaadi Vayyaram Bhale	Annapurna	1960	S. Dakshinamurthi	Aarudhra	Ghantasala	Jamuna	Telugu
Vagaloi Vagalu	Pathala Bhairavi	1951	Ghantasala	Pingali Nagendrarao			Telugu
Valapula Valaraja	Shavukaru	1950	Ghantasala	Samudrala Sr.	Pithapuram Nageswara Rao		Telugu
Valapulu Chilike	Vachina Kodalu Nachindi	1959	S. Dakshinamurthi	Acharya Aatreya		Jamuna	Telugu
Valapu Thene Paata	Abhimanam	1960	Ghantasala	Aarudhra	Ghantasala	Savitri	Telugu
Valarum Kalaiyin Paalmathi	Thooya Ullam	1961	Pendyala Nageswara Rao	Udumalai Narayana Kavi	P. Susheela	Girija	Tamil
Vallenolli Maavaa Neena Magalani	Lava Kusa	1963	Ghantasala		Pithapuram Nageswara Rao, J. V. Raghavulu & K. Rani	Girija	Kannada
Vallona Sikkindira	Sri Gauri Mahatyam	1956	Ogirala Ramachandra Rao & T. V. Raju	Kosaraju Raghavaiah	Pithapuram Nageswara Rao	Rita	Telugu
Vanamevum Rajakumaraa	Raja Desingu	1960	G. Ramanathan		Seerkazhi Govindarajan	Padmini	Tamil
Vandhadhu Vasandham Vandhadhu	Edhir Paradhathu	1954	C. N. Pandurangan	Kanaga Surabhi	A. M. Rajah	Padmini	Tamil
Vandhadu Yogam Vaazhvile	Koteeswaran	1955	S. V. Venkatraman	Thanjai N. Ramaiah Dass	P. Leela		Tamil
Vandhu Vandhu Konjuvathen Vennilaave	Pennin Perumai	1956	A. Rama Rao & B. Narasimha Rao	Thanjai N. Ramaiah Dass		Savitri	Tamil
Vandu Vandhu Paadaamal	Nalla Theerpu	1959	S. M. Subbaiah Naidu	Ku. Ma. Balasubramaniam		M. N. Rajam	Tamil
Vannakkuyil Naane	Pakka Thirudan	1957	T. M. Ibrahim	Ku. Ma. Balasubramaniam		Helen	Tamil
Vanna Vanna Solledutthu	Senthamizh Paattu	1992	M. S. Viswanathan & Ilaiyaraaja	Vaali		Title Song	Tamil
Varaporaar Mappillai	Raja Vikrama	1950	S. Rajam				Tamil
Vasandha Kaalam	Bommai Kalyanam	1958	K. V. Mahadevan	Udumalai Narayana Kavi		Jamuna	Tamil
Vastundoy Vastundi	Jayam Manade	1956	Ghantasala	Kosaraju Raghavaiah	Ghantasala	Anjali Devi	Telugu
Varum Kaalam Ulagam Namadhendre	Avan Amaran	1958	T. M. Ibrahim	A. Maruthakasi		Rajasulochana	Tamil
Varundhathe Ezhai Maname	Mallika	1957	T. R. Pappa			Padmini	Tamil
Varuvaai Aasai Kiliye	Amma	1952	V. Dakshinamurthy	Chidambaram Varadarajan	Gokulapalan		Tamil
Vayaari Raajaa Jilibi Valapula Raniroy	Roopavathi	1951			K. Rani		Telugu
Veenaagumaa Vaazh Naal	Puyal	1952	S. G. K. Pillai & P. S. Divakar	P. S. Divakar		M. V. Rajamma	Tamil
Veena Poove Veena Poove	Kathirukanakkili	1958	G. Devarajan	Vayalar Ramavarma			Malayalam
Veeragandham Pettinamaya	Jayam Manade	1956	Ghantasala	Kosaraju Raghavaiah	Pithapuram Nageswara Rao	Anjali Devi	Telugu
Vellai Kudhiraiyile	Raja Bakthi	1960	G. Govindarajulu Naidu	A. Maruthakasi	A. P. Komala		Tamil
Velli Mulaithathu Vaanile Ammaa	Pattaliyin Vetri	1960	S. Rajeswara Rao & Master Venu	Udumalai Narayana Kavi		Savitri	Tamil
Velli Panam Kaasu	Naan Vanangum Dheivam	1963	K. V. Mahadevan			Kumari Kamala	Tamil
Velugeleni Eelokana	Sobha	1958	A. M. Rajah	P. Vasanth Kumar Reddy	J. V. Raghavulu	Anjali Devi	Telugu
Velugu Rekhalavaru	Seetharamaiah Gari Manavaralu	1991	M. M. Keeravani	Veturi Sundaramurthi	K. S. Chithra		Telugu
Vennela Viruyunura	Sonta Ooru	1956	Ghantasala		J. V. Raghavulu	Sowcar Janaki	Telugu
Vennilavu Poothu	Krishna Kuchela	1961	K. Raghavan	P. Bhaskaran	P. Leela & Santha P. Nair		Malayalam
Venugaanammu Vinipinchene	Siri Sampadalu	1962	Master Venu	Kosaraju Raghavaiah	P. Susheela & S. Janaki	Girija	Telugu
Veyara Debba	Lava Kusa	1963	Ghantasala		Pithapuram Nageswara Rao	Girija	Kannada
Veyara Debba	Lava Kusa	1963	Ghantasala	Samudrala Sr.	Ghantasala	Girija	Telugu
Vidhiye Pagaye	Stree Sahasam	1951	C. R. Subburaman	Samudrala Sr.	S. Dakshinamurthi		Telugu
Vikrama Raajendraa	Bhakta Kuchela	1961	Br Lakshmanan	Thirunainar Kurichi Madhavan Nair			Malayalam
Vilakketri Vaikkavum Illai	Engal Veettu Mahalakshmi	1957	Master Venu	A. Maruthakasi		Rajasulochana	Tamil
Vinavoyi Batasari	Jayam Manade	1956	Ghantasala	Kosaraju Raghavaiah		Anjali Devi	Telugu
Virahavyadha Maracukatha	Shavukaru	1950	Ghantasala	Samudrala Sr.	Pithapuram Nageswara Rao		Telugu
Vinnil Vaazhum Dhevano	Manthravadi	1956	Br Lakshmanan	Nagai Mani	Seerkazhi Govindarajan	Kumari Thankam	Tamil
Virikindra Vennilaave	Bala Nagamma	1959	T. V. Raju		Ghantasala	Anjali Devi	Tamil
Virisindi Vintha Haayi	Bala Nagamma	1959	T. V. Raju	Samudrala Jr.	Ghantasala	Anjali Devi	Telugu
Vodduraa Kannayya	Ardhangi	1955	Master Venu & B. Narasimha Rao	Acharya Aatreya		Savitri	Telugu
Vollanori Maamaa Nee Pillani	Lava Kusa	1963	Ghantasala	Samudrala Sr.	Ghantasala, J. V. Raghavulu & K. Rani	Girija	Telugu
Vunnaru Vunnaru	Santosham	1955	Viswanathan–Ramamoorthy			Anjali Devi	Telugu
Vuntenemi	Palletoori Pilla	1950	P. Adinarayana Rao	Tapi Dharma Rao		Anjali Devi	Telugu
Yaaradi Nee Mohini	Uthama Puthiran	1958	G. Ramanathan	Ku. Ma. Balasubramaniam	T. M. Soundararajan, A. P. Komala & K. Jamuna Rani	Helen	Tamil
Yaaro Yaaro Vandhavar Yaaro	Madhu Malathi	1968	M. Ranga Rao	Devanarayanan		Bharathi	Tamil
Yauvana Raanithaan	Mudhalali	1957	K. V. Mahadevan	Ka. Mu. Sheriff		M. N. Rajam	Tamil
Yedukondalavada Venkataramana	Pelli Chesi Choodu	1952	Ghantasala	Pingali Nagendrarao		G. Varalakshmi	Telugu
Yeelamaavi Thotalona	Sobha	1958	A. M. Rajah	P. Vasanth Kumar Reddy		Anjali Devi	Telugu
Yekkadunnadi Dharmamekkadunnadi	Charana Daasi	1956	S. Rajeswara Rao	Samudrala Sr.	K. Rani	Ambika	Telugu
Yendukoi Reraaju	Uma Sundari	1956	G. Aswathama	Vempati Sadasivabrahmam	Ghantasala	Sriranjani	Telugu
Yetu Choosina	Irugu Porugu	1963	Master Venu	Aarudhra		Krishna Kumari	Telugu

== Bibliography ==
- Neelamegam, G. (December 2014). Thiraikalanjiyam – Part 1 (in Tamil) (1st ed.). Chennai: Manivasagar Publishers 044 25361039.
- Neelamegam, G. (November 2016). Thiraikalanjiyam – Part 2 (in Tamil) (1st ed.). Chennai: Manivasagar Publishers 044 25361039.
- Film News Anandan (23 October 2004). Sadhanaigal Padaitha Thamizh Thiraipada Varalaru (in Tamil). Chennai: Sivakami Publishers.
