= Vanamala =

Vanamala or Vanamali (lit. 'forest garland') may refer to:

- Vanamali, a type of Vaijayanti or theological garland in Hinduism associated with Vishnu and Krishna
- Vanamala (actress) (1915–2007), Indian actress
- Vanamala (film), a 1951 Indian Malayalam-language film
