= Vazhvile Oru Naal =

- Theatrical release poster
- Directed by: A. Kasilingam
- Based on: Kasappum Inippum by A. V. P. Asaithambi
- Produced by: U. R. Jeevarathnam
- Starring: Sivaji Ganesan; G. Varalakshmi; Sriram; Rajasulochana
- Cinematography: G. K. Ramu; V. Kumaradevan
- Edited by: P. V. Narayanan
- Music by: C. N. Pandurangan; T. G. Lingappa; S. M. Subbaiah Naidu
- Production company: Mercury Films
- Distributed by: K. S. Pictures
- Release date: 21 September 1956
- Country: India
- Language: Tamil

Vazhvile Oru Naal (transl. One day in life) is a 1956 Indian Tamil-language film, directed by A. Kasilingam and produced by U. R. Jeevarathnam. The film stars Sivaji Ganesan, G. Varalakshmi, Sriram and Rajasulochana. Based on the novel Kasappum Inippum by A. V. P. Asaithambi, it was released on 21 September 1956.

== Cast ==
- Sivaji Ganesan as Kannan/Salimkaboor Bai
- G. Varalakshmi as Janaki/Kaladevi
- Sriram as Muthu/Murugan
- Rajasulochana as Lakshmi
- V. K. Ramasamy as Vazhavanthan
- Friend Ramasamy as Sokkalingam
- M. Santhanam as Drama Company Owner
- Thirupathysamy as Gajapathy

== Soundtrack ==
The music was composed by C. N. Pandurangan, T. G. Lingappa & S. M. Subbaiah Naidu.

Song	Singers	Lyrics	Length
"Thendrale Vaaraayo"	T. M. Soundararajan & U. R. Jeevarathinam	Ku. Sa. Krishnamurthy	03:27
"Ninaive Avar Ninaive"	T. A. Mothi & Jikki	T. K. Sundhara Vathiyar	03:12
"Azhagai Rasippom Kalaiyai Valarppom"	Jikki	Ku. Sa. Krishnamoorthy	06:00
"Bombai Mittai Thambi"	M. M. Muthu & Suguna Kumar		02:30
"Then Dhisaikkone Dharma Seemaane"	U. R. Jeevarathinam	Ku. Sa. Krishnamurthy	00:51
"Karunai Seivaaye Kamalakkannaa"	U. R. Jeevarathinam	Ku. Sa. Krishnamurthy	01:21
"Mannilum Vinnilum.... Ezhai Vaazhvil Engum Thunbam"	C. S. Jayaraman	K. S. Gopalakrishnan	03:07
"Kaiyaal Aagaadha Aasaami Pole"	Jikki		02:07
"Jegam Meedhiley Naam Inaiyaagave"	T. A. Mothi & Jikki	Kavi C. A. Lakshmana Dass	03:14
