= Puyal =

- Poster
- Directed by: G. Viswanath
- Screenplay by: (Dialogues) Karmayogi Rajagopal
- Story by: C. J. Cherian
- Produced by: K. P. George
- Starring: G. M. Basheer; M. V. Rajamma
- Cinematography: G. P. Ramasamy; G. K. Ramu
- Edited by: G. Viswanath
- Music by: S. G. K. Pillai; P. S. Diwakar
- Production company: Pelican Pictures
- Release date: 25 July 1952
- Running time: 197 minutes
- Country: India
- Language: Tamil

Puyal (transl. Storm) is a 1952 Indian Tamil-language film directed by G. Viswanath. The film stars G. M. Basheer and M. V. Rajamma. It was released on 25 July 1952.

== Cast ==
List adapted from the database of Film News Anandan and from Thiraikalanjiyam.

Male cast

- G. M. Basheer
- A. K. Mohan
- K. R. Ramsingh

Female cast

- M. V. Rajamma
- M. Rajee
- R. Lakshmi Devi
- S. Sakunthala
- G. M. Gulzar

== Production ==
The film was produced by K. P. George under the banner Pelican Pictures and was directed by G. Viswanath who also did the editing. Story was written by C. J. Cherian while the dialogues were penned by Karmayogi Rajagopalan. G. P. Ramasamy and G. K. Ramu were in charge of cinematography. Art direction was by Kuttiyappu and Ponnusam and Choreography was done by C. Thangaraj. Still photography was by K. Anandan. The film was made at Central Studios.

== Soundtrack ==
Music was composed by S. G. K. Pillai and P. S. Diwakar while the lyrics were penned by Diwakar.

Song	Singer/s	Duration (m:ss)
"Punitha Hridhaya Paripooranane"		
"Thaaye En Thaayee Thunbamellaam"		
"Devaadhi Devan Neeye"		
"O Arul Maamaniye"		
"Naalae Nalla Naalae"	Jikki	
"O Katti Karumbe"	Jikki	03:04
"Veenaagumaa Vaazh Naarl"	Jikki	
"Yaen Pirandhaayi Nee Poologam Mael"	Jikki	
"Jegamadhile Oru Anaadhai"	Jikki	03:12
"Thanmanamae Nilai Dhaan Vaeraanaal"	Jikki	
"Happy Hello My Darling"		
"Praemaiyinaale Naanum"	Jikki & Mehboob	
"Vaadudhe Yen Manam"	Jikki & Mehboob	
