= Kalyanam Seydhukko =

- Poster
- Directed by: R. Chander
- Screenplay by: Anandan
- Story by: R. Chander
- Starring: P. S. Govindan; Girija; A. Karunanidhi; V. S. Raghavan
- Cinematography: V. K. Gopal
- Edited by: T. Vijayarangam
- Music by: Ramaneekaran
- Production company: Sri Unity Pictures
- Release date: 30 September 1955
- Country: India
- Language: Tamil

Kalyanam Seydhuko (transl. Do get married) is a 1955 Indian Tamil-language film directed by R. Chander. The film stars P. S. Govindan and Girija. Initially scheduled to release in July 1955, it was released on 30 September 1955.

== Cast ==
List adapted from Film News Anandan's database and Pesum Padam.

- P. S. Govindan as Chandar
- Girija as Kala
- Venkataraman as Hari
- M. S. S. Bhagyam as Bhagyam
- A. Karunanidhi
- K. S. Angamuthu
- V. S. Raghavan as Viswam
- Pandanallur Lakshmi

== Soundtrack ==
Music was composed by Ramaneekaran.

Song	Singer/s	Lyricist	Length
"Mandhiram Yaavum Onre"	Sirkazhi Govindarajan	Kalyan	
"Aasai Venum Kaasu Panam Theda"	Sirkazhi Govindarajan & Paramasivam	Kalyan	
"Kodukkathaan Vendumammaa"	A. P. Komala	Kalyan	
"Dharmam Needhi Karunai Maraindha"	Vasu	Kalyan	
"Raajaa En Aasai Machaan"	Sirkazhi Govindarajan & A. P. Komala	Kalyan	
"Manam Polave"	Jikki & A. V. Saraswathi	Kalyan	
"Vaazhvin Oliye Varuvaai"	Jikki & Sirkazhi Govindarajan	Kalyan	
"Endhan Kaadhal Kanavu Aanadhe"	Jikki	Kalyan	
"Engum Nirai Paramporul Onre"	Sirkazhi Govindarajan	Ka. Mu. Sheriff	3:03
"Vaetti Kattina Pombale"	Sirkazhi Govindarajan & Soolamangalam Jayalakshmi	Ka. Mu. Sheriff	
