= Thirunainar Kurichi Madhavan Nair =

Indian poet, novelist, and lyricist (1916–1965)

Madhavan Nair
- Born: Thirunainar Kurichi Madhavan Nair; 16 April 1916; Thirunainar Kurichi, Colachel, Travancore (now in Kanyakumari district, Tamil Nadu, India)
- Died: 1 April 1965 (aged 48); Trivandrum, Kerala
- Occupations: Lyricist, poet
- Spouse: Ponnamma
- Parent(s): Raman Nair, Ammasree Narayani Pillai

Thirunainar Kurichi Madhavan Nair (1916–1965) was an Indian poet, novelist and lyricist of film songs. He was also an employee of Travancore Radio Station in Trivandrum, which was later merged with All India Radio. He was very active in Malayalam films from 1951 to 1965 and wrote over 300 film songs of which most were hits. Thirunainar Kurichi and music director Brother Lakshmanan were a hit duo during the 1950s and 60s. Thirunainar Kurichi also wrote numerous poems, dramas and novels in the 1950s and 1960s.

Madhavan Nair was born at Kovil Valakathu puthen veetil Tharavad in Thirunainarkurichi town near Karaikandeshwarar Sree Mahadevar temple & Velimala Murugan temple, which is around Colachel in Kanyakumari district of the present-day Tamil Nadu. He was popularly known in the name of his birthplace.

Born on 16 April 1916 to Raman Nair and Narayani Pillai, he lost his father at a very young age. After education in Trivandrum and at his native place he took up a job as a teacher at a school in Colachel. He married Ponnamma and has a daughter named Jayashree. The film producer P. Subramaniam was his close friend and so the poet was the lyricist for the movies made in Subramaniam's Merryland Studios. His novel Maina was made into a Malayalam film Kattumaina. A writer of good novels like Paricharika, Pension Kunnu, Maina, Grama Seema, Kadamakalkkuvendi, Sarva Sakshi, Cheriya Valiyavan and Mayadevi, he is more famous as a poet. His famous songs include "Athmavidyalayame" from Harishchandra (1955) and "Ishwara Chinthaithonne Manujanu" from Bhakta Kuchela (1961). Most of his songs were tuned by Br. Lakshmanan and sung by Kamukara Purushothaman. He died aged 49 at Trivandrum Medical College on 1 April 1965. The cause of his death was cancer. His Tharavad is nearly 180 years old and still in Thirunainarkurichi.
