= Kanavu (film) =

- Directed by: P. V. Krishnan
- Screenplay by: K. Devanarayanan; A. S. Rajagopal
- Story by: M. B. Chellappan Nair
- Produced by: P. V. Krishnan
- Starring: G. Muthukrishnan; Lalitha; V. K. Ramasamy 'Pollachi' Kamala
- Cinematography: N. C. Balakrishnan
- Edited by: V. S. Rajan
- Music by: G. Ramanathan; V. Dakshinamoorthy
- Production company: K. R. K. Productions
- Release date: 5 August 1954
- Running time: 162 mins.
- Country: India
- Language: Tamil

Kanavu (transl. Dream) is a 1954 Indian Tamil-language film directed and produced by P. V. Krishnan. The film stars G. Muthukrishnan and Lalitha. It was released on 5 August 1954.

== Cast ==
List adapted from the database of Film News Anandan.

Male cast

- Valayapathi G. Muthukrishnan
- V. K. Ramasamy
- R. Balasubramaniam
- S. S. Sivasooriyan
- V. Selvam

Female cast

- Lalitha
- Pollachi Kamala
- M. K. Lakshmi
- A. Shanthi

== Production ==
The film was produced and directed by P. V. Krishnan under the banner K. R. K. Productions. M. B. Chellappan Nair wrote the story while K. Devanarayanan and A. S. Rajagopal wrote the dialogues. Cinematography was handled by N. C. Balakrishnan and editing was done by V. S. Rajan. Ammaiyappan was in charge of art direction. Hiralal, Kumar and Balaraman handled the choreography. Still photography was done by Venkatachary. The film was processed at Vikram laboratory.

== Soundtrack ==
Music was composed by G. Ramanathan and V. Dakshinamoorthy.

Song	Singer/s	Lyricist
"Kannaana Thaai Naadae"	M. L. Vasanthakumari	A. Maruthakasi
"Eliyorku Suga Vaazhvu Yedhu"	M. L. Vasanthakumari	A. Maruthakasi
"Annaale Nannaal"	Jikki	A. Maruthakasi
"Karuvande Katti Karkande"	Jikki	A. Maruthakasi
"Paedhai Naan Anaadhaiyaayi"		A. Maruthakasi
"Engume Thai Pongal"	M. L. Vasanthakumari & group	A. S. Rajagopal
"Thandhaka Thaganaka"	Soolamangalam Rajalakshmi	A. S. Rajagopal
"Pala Pala Pakkaa Thirudan Naan"	V. P. Balaraman	A. S. Rajagopal
"Thri Logamum Pugazhum Sundara"	V. P. Balaraman	A. S. Rajagopal
