= Vanamala (film) =

- Promotional poster
- Directed by: G. Viswanath
- Written by: G. Viswanath
- Screenplay by: G. Viswanath
- Produced by: V&C Productions
- Starring: P. A. Thomas; Ammini
- Cinematography: Arumukham
- Music by: P. S. Divakar
- Distributed by: Central Pictures Release, Kottayam
- Release date: 9 June 1951
- Country: India
- Language: Malayalam

Vanamala is a 1951 Indian Malayalam-language film, directed by G. Viswanath and produced by V&C Productions. The film stars P. A. Thomas and Ammini in lead roles. The film had musical score by P. S. Divakar. It is the first jungle movie in Malayalam, also the debut film of Neyyattinkara Komalam, director G. Viswanath, lyricist P. Kunjukrishna Menon, singer Jikki and cameraman Arumugham.

== Cast ==
- P. A. Thomas
- Ammini
- Muthukulam Raghavan Pillai
- Baby Lakshmi
- Karthikeyan Nair
- Sumathikkutty Amma
- Kamala Bhargavan
- Neyyaattinkara Komalam
- Kanchana
- Raju
- Ambalappuzha Krishnamoorthy
- Kandiyoor Parameshwaran Pillai
- S. P. Pillai
