= Ku. Sa. Krishnamurthy =

Ku. Sa. Krishnamurthy

Kumbakonam Swaminatha Pillai Krishnamurthy (1914-1990) was an Indian poet, lyricist, writer, novelist, and screenplay writer for Tamil Language films and plays.

== Life ==
He was born on 19 May 1914 to Swaminatha Pillai and Meenakshi Ammal.

== Works ==
- Amutha Tamizhisai
- Arutpa isaiamudham
- Andhaman Kaidhi
- Isai inbam
- Paruva Mazhai
- Tamil Nadaga Varalaru
- Kalaivanan (play)

His works are nationalised by the Government of Tamil Nadu.

He wrote the screenplay for the movie Andhaman Kaidhi and the lyrics for many Tamil movie songs.
