= N. L. Ganasaraswathi =

Indian Music Artist

N. L. Ganasaraswathi was an Indian playback singer who sang mainly in Tamil films and some Telugu and Malayalam films. She was active in the field during the 1950s and early 1960s and sang many songs based on Carnatic music ragas. Most of her songs were used for dance sequences in the films.

== Discography ==
Tamil

The following list is compiled from Thiraikalanjiyam Part 1 and Thiraikalanjiyam Part 2

Year	Film	Language	Song	MD	Lyricist	Co-singer/s
1951	Devaki	Tamil	Illaram Kaapadhuve	G. Ramanathan		
1951	Devaki	Tamil	Chandhiranai Vaanam... Uyir Vaazhveno	G. Ramanathan		
1951	Devaki	Tamil	Annaiye Naan Anaadhai	G. Ramanathan		
1951	Rupavathi	Telugu	Naa Thanuve Sumaa	C. R. Subburaman	K. G. Sharma	
1952	Aathmasakhi	Malayalam	Jayam Jayam Staanajayam	Br Lakshmanan	Thirunayinaarkurichi Madhavan Nair	
1952	Amarakavi	Tamil	Ellaam Inbame	G. Ramanathan; T. A. Kalyanam	Suratha	M. K. Thyagaraja Bhagavathar
1952	Amarakavi	Tamil	Mullaich Chirippile	G. Ramanathan; T. A. Kalyanam	Lakshmanadas	P. Leela
1952	Amarakavi	Tamil	Mookkuththi Minnudhu	G. Ramanathan; T. A. Kalyanam	Lakshmanadas	P. Leela
1952	Kumari	Tamil	Naattukku Nalam Naaduvom	K. V. Mahadevan	M. P. Sivam	
1952	Moondru Pillaigal	Tamil	Unnarul Maraven Aiya	P. S. Anantharaman; M. D. Parthasarathy	Kothamangalam Subbu	
1952	Premalekha	Malayalam	Aariraaro	P. S. Divakar	Vanakutty Raman Pillai	
1952	Premalekha	Malayalam	Anuraagappoonilaavil	P. S. Divakar	Vanakutty Raman Pillai	Ramani
1952	Premalekha	Malayalam	Paaduka Neelakkuyile	P. S. Divakar	Vanakutty Raman Pillai	
1952	Thai Ullam	Tamil	Poo Chendu Nee	V. Nagayya; A. Rama Rao	Kanakasurabhi	T. A. Mothi, (Radha) Jayaladchumi
1953	Amarakavi	Telugu		G. Ramanathan; T. K. Kumaraswamy		Ghantasala
1953	Amarakavi	Telugu		G. Ramanathan; T. K. Kumaraswamy		P. Leela
1953	Anbu	Tamil	Vendhazhalaai Erikkum Venmadhiye	T. R. Pappa	Thandapani	A. P. Komala
1953	En Veedu	Tamil	Ennenna Aasai Kaattinaaye	V. Nagayya; A. Rama Rao	Surabhi	
1953	En Veedu	Tamil	Kanmaniye Kanmaniye	V. Nagayya; A. Rama Rao	Surabhi	N. Lalitha
1953	En Veedu	Tamil	Pongalo Pongal	V. Nagayya; A. Rama Rao	Papanasam Sivan	Group
1953	En Veedu	Tamil	Konjum Mozhi Maindargale	V. Nagayya; A. Rama Rao	Papanasam Sivan	N. Lalitha
1953	Lakshmi	Tamil		M. D. Parthasarathy		
1953	Lakshmi	Telugu	Veditinamma Velpulakomma	M. D. Parthasarathy		
1953	Madana Mohini	Tamil	Aadhi Mudhalaanavar	K. V. Mahadevan	M. P. Sivam	A. P. Komala
1953	Mugguru Kodukkulu	Telugu	Araaghu Raa Muni	K. G. Moorthy		M. L. Vasanthakumari
1953	Naa Illu	Telugu	Emani Basaladeve Emani	V. Nagayya; A. Rama Rao		
1953	Naa Illu	Telugu	Ravamma Ravamma Ratanala Bomma	V. Nagayya; A. Rama Rao	Devulapalli Krishnasastri	N. Lalitha
1953	Naa Illu	Telugu	Gobbillo Gobbillo	V. Nagayya; A. Rama Rao	Devulapalli Krishnasastri	Group
1953	Naalvar	Tamil	Arul Thaarum Emathannaiye	K. V. Mahadevan	A. Maruthakasi	
1953	Prapancham	Telugu	Prema Sudha Sarasilo	M. S. Gnanamani & Poornanandha		Ghantasala
1953	Ulagam	Tamil	Kaadhalinaal Ulagame Inbamadhe	M. S. Gnanamani	Kuyilan	Thiruchi Loganathan
1953	Ulagam	Tamil	Kalaiye Uyir Thunaiye	M. S. Gnanamani	Kavi Kunjaram	
1954	Avakasi	Malayalam	Kanninum Kannaayi	Br Lakshmanan	Thirunayinaarkurichi Madhavan Nair	
1954	Avakasi	Malayalam	Thullithulli Odivae	Br Lakshmanan	Thirunayinaarkurichi Madhavan Nair	V. N. Sundaram
1954	Bangaru Bhoomi	Telugu	Bava Manapeḷḷi Entho Baga Jaragali	Thuraiyur Rajagopala Sarma & R. Rajagopal		M. V. Nagaraj
1954	Bangaru Bhoomi	Telugu	Viḍanade Yiloka Meenadu Maa	Thuraiyur Rajagopala Sarma & R. Rajagopal		
1954	Bangaru Bhoomi	Telugu	Parugidara Joruga Parugidara	Thuraiyur Rajagopala Sarma & R. Rajagopal		Seerkazhi Govindarajan
1954	Madiddunnu Maharaya	Kannada	Nalidhu Nalidhu	P. Shyamanna	Hunsur Goutham	P. Susheela
1954	Nallakalam	Tamil	Kannaale Kaanbadhum	K. V. Mahadevan	M. P. Sivam	
1954	Ponvayal	Tamil	Namma Kalyaanam Romba Nalla Kalyaanam	Thuraiyur Rajagopala Sarma & R. Rajagopal	T. K. Sundara Vathiyar	T. R. Ramachandran
1954	Ponvayal	Tamil	Pongalo Pongal Pongalo	Thuraiyur Rajagopala Sarma & R. Rajagopal	Suddhananda Bharathiyaar	
1954	Ponvayal	Tamil	Polladha Paavigal Ellaam	Thuraiyur Rajagopala Sarma & R. Rajagopal		
1954	Ponvayal	Tamil	Maadugalaa Kaalai Maadugalaa	Thuraiyur Rajagopala Sarma & R. Rajagopal		Seerkazhi Govindarajan
1954	Pudhu Yugam	Tamil	Jaadhiyile Naanga Thaazhndhavanga	G. Ramanathan	Ka. Mu. Sheriff	Jikki, A. P. Komala, A. G. Rathnamala
1955	CID	Malayalam	Kaalamellaamullaasam	Br Lakshmanan	Thirunayinaarkurichi Madhavan Nair	V. N. Sundaram & P. Leela
1955	Kalvanin Kadhali	Tamil	Thamizh Thirunaadu Thannai Petra	G. Govindarajulu Naidu; Ghantasala	Kavimani Desigavinayagam Pillai	M. L. Vasanthakumari
1955	Kanyasulkam	Telugu	Sarasudasarichera	Ghantasala	Vempati Sadasivabrahmam	
1955	Kanyasulkam	Telugu	Illu Illanievu	Ghantasala	Gurazada Apparao	
1955	Kanyasulkam	Telugu	Keechaka Vadha	Ghantasala	Samudrala Sr.	Madhavapeddi Satyam
1955	Nalla Thangal	Tamil	Evale Avale	G. Ramanathan	A. Maruthakasi	
1955	Nam Kuzhandai	Tamil	Paalaivanameedhile Jeevanadhi Polave	M. D. Parthasarathy	Thanjai N. Ramaiah Dass	
1955	Needhipathi	Tamil	Aanandhame Aanandam	Viswanathan–Ramamoorthy	A. Maruthakasi	T. V. Rathnam
1956	Kannin Manigal	Tamil	Maheswari Undhan	S. V. Venkatraman	Papanasam Sivan	
1956	Kannin Manigal	Tamil	Vinaiyo Nin Sodhanaiyo	S. V. Venkatraman	Papanasam Sivan	
1956	Kannin Manigal	Tamil	Nayagar Padshamadi	S. V. Venkatraman	Kavimani Desigavinayagam Pillai	
1956	Naane Raja	Tamil	Aadar Kalaikkazhagu Sera Pirandhaval	T. R. Ramanath	Bharathidasan	P. Leela
1956	Naga Panjami	Tamil	Aanandam Thandhaane			
1956	Ondre Kulam	Tamil	Mangkilai Maele Poonguyil Kooviyadhu	S. V. Venkatraman	Surabhi	V. N. Sundaram, K. Rani, M. S. Rajeswari, Kalyani
1956	Paditha Penn	Tamil	Irul Soozhndha Ulaginile	Arun and Raghavan	Kavi Lakshmanadas	
1956	Paditha Penn	Tamil	Vaazhvinile Kaanaene Inbam	Arun and Raghavan	Aroordas	
1956	Raja Rani	Tamil	Aanandha Nilai Peruvom	T. R. Pappa	M. K. Athmanathan	T. V. Rathnam
1956	Rambaiyin Kaadhal	Tamil	Kalaignanam Uravaadum Naadu	T. R. Pappa	A. Maruthakasi	P. Leela
1956	Sivasakthi	Tamil	Sundara Vadhaname	T. G. Lingappa		
1956	Sivasakthi	Tamil	Maayaa Valaiyil Veezhndhu	T. G. Lingappa		
1956	Uma Sundari	Telugu	Daatipogalada Naa Cheyi	G. Aswathama	Vempati Sadasivabrahmam	
1957	Ambikapathy	Tamil	Kanda Kanavu Indru Palitthadhe	G. Ramanathan	Balakavi	
1957	Nala Damayanthi	Telugu	Inti Maa Damayanthi Srimantamipuḍu	B. Gopalam	Samudrala Jr.	
1957	Nala Damayanthi	Telugu	Cheliyaro Nee Jeevitesuni Valachi	B. Gopalam	Samudrala Jr.	P. Leela
1957	Samaya Sanjeevi	Tamil	Aanandam Tharuvadhu Sangeethame	G. Ramanathan	A. Maruthakasi	(Radha) Jayalakshmi
1958	Nadodi Mannan	Tamil	Varuga Varuga Vendhe	S. M. Subbaiah Naidu	Suratha	P. S. Vaidhehi
1959	Manimekalai	Tamil	Pazahangkaala Thamizharin Vaazhkai Nilai	G. Ramanathan	A. Maruthakasi	M. L. Vasanthakumari
1959	Manimekalai	Tamil	Avaniyil Pudhu Araneriye	G. Ramanathan	A. Maruthakasi	Thiruchi Loganathan
1959	Thalai Koduthaan Thambi	Tamil	Thalai Kodutthaan Thambi	Viswanathan–Ramamoorthy	A. Maruthakasi	S. C. Krishnan, Sirkazhi Govindarajan
1959	Thalai Koduthaan Thambi	Tamil	Panneeril Thalai Muzhugi	Viswanathan–Ramamoorthy	A. Maruthakasi	S. C. Krishnan, Sirkazhi Govindarajan
1959	Thalai Koduthaan Thambi	Tamil	Anaivarum Karuthudan	Viswanathan–Ramamoorthy	A. Maruthakasi	S. C. Krishnan, Sirkazhi Govindarajan
1960	Devanthakudu	Telugu	Ilalo Ledoyi Haayi	G. Aswathaama	Aarudhra	P. Leela
1960	Naan Kanda Sorgam	Tamil	Ilamai Maaraadha Inbam	G. Aswathaama		P. Leela
1961	Malliyam Mangalam	Tamil	Singaara Velaa Vilaiyaada Vaa	T. A. Kalyanam	V. Seetharaman	T. M. Soundararajan
