= Queen (TV series) =

2019 Indian web series

- Genre: Historical drama
- Created by: Reshma Ghatala
- Based on: Queen by Anita Sivakumaran
- Written by: Reshma Ghatala
- Directed by: Gautham Vasudev Menon; Prasath Murugesan
- Starring: Ramya Krishnan; Anjana Jayaprakash; Anikha Surendran
- Composer: Darbuka Siva
- Country of origin: India
- Original languages: Tamil; English
- No. of seasons: 1
- No. of episodes: 11

Production
- Cinematography: S. R. Kathir
- Editor: Praveen Antony
- Production companies: MX Originals; Ondraga Digital

Original release
- Network: MX Player
- Release: 16 December 2019 – present

Queen is an Indian Tamil-language period biographical drama streaming television series created by Reshma Ghatala. An adaptation of Anita Sivakumaran's novel of the same name, which is loosely based on the life of the late Tamil Nadu Chief Minister J. Jayalalithaa, the script was written by Ghatala, with Gautham Vasudev Menon and Prasath Murugesan, jointly directing the series.

The series stars Ramya Krishnan, essaying the lead role as Shakthi Sheshadri, a fictional character resembling the former politician, while Anjana Jayaprakash and Anikha Surendran portraying the younger versions of Sheshadri. Indrajith Sukumaran, Vamsi Krishna, Tulasi / Sonia Agarwal, Lillete Dubey amongst others appear in prominent roles. The series chronicles the life and evolution of Sheshadri, and her journey from cinema industry to the politics.

MX Player announced the plans for a streaming series based on the life of Jayalalithaa and hired Gautham Menon to direct the series. Menon who eventually planned to make her biopic as feature film, eventually reinstated his decision to direct it as a streaming series, due to restrictions in censor board. Menon also produced the film under Ondraga Digital along with Times Studio Originals. The shooting of the film took place from December 2018 and wrapped up in March 2019. The series features cinematography and editing handled by S. R. Kathir and Praveen Anthony, with background score composed by Darbuka Siva.

The first season of Queen which consists of 11 episodes, was released through the streaming service MX Player on 14 December 2019. The series eventually received positive reviews praising Ramya Krishnan's performance, among other cast members and also the major technical aspects of production. Apart from its digital premiere, the series also broadcast through Zee Tamil in July 2020. Queen won the award for Best Series at the Singapore Asian Academy Creative Awards in December 2020. In April 2020, Menon announced that the series was renewed for a second season.

== Premise ==
This first season has eleven episodes which depicts the life and evolution of Shakthi Sheshadri. This starts from the childhood days of her and the reason behind her entry into the cinema industry, The way she learned everything in the cinema, The relationship between Shakthi and GMR and finally her political entry.

== Cast ==
=== Main ===
- Ramya Krishnan as Shakthi Seshadri (Based on J. Jayalalithaa)
  - Anjana Jayaprakash as the vicenarian Shakthi Seshadri
  - Anikha Surendran as the young Shakthi Seshadri
- Indrajith Sukumaran as G. M. Ravichandran (Based on M. G. Ramachandran)
- Vamsi Krishna as Chaitanya Reddy (Based on Sobhan Babu)
- Nandha Durairaj as Dinesh Arulselvan
- Tulasi Shivamani as Ranganayaki, Shakthi Sheshadri's mother (Based on Sandhya, Jayalalitha's mother)
  - Sonia Agarwal as young Ranganayaki, Shakthi Sheshadri's mother
- Lilette Dubey as an interviewer (Based on Simi Garewal)

=== Supporting ===
- R. Parthiban as Ravichandran
- Karuppu Nambiar as Syed
- Gautham Vasudev Menon as Sridhar (Based on C. V. Sridhar)
- Vivek Rajgopal as Pradeepan
- Samuthirakani as Mariappan
- Munna Simon as Srikanth, Shakthi Sheshadri's brother
  - Munaf Rahman as young Srikanth
- Janaki Suresh as Alamelu – Shakthi's best friend
  - Deepa Ramanathan as vicenarian Alamelu
  - Yukta Bhardwaj as young Alamelu
- Vanitha Krishnachandran as Janani Devi (Based on V. N. Janaki Ramachandran)
- Viji Chandrasekhar as Suriyakala (Based on V. K. Sasikala)
- Mari Muthu As Dhanaraj (Based On M. Natarajan)
- Rajie Vijay Sarathy as Sister Flavia
- Sarjano Khalid as young Co-star Vinith (Based on Actor Srikanth)
- MS Harini as young Co-star Viji (Based on Vennira Aadai Nirmala)
- Hans Kaushik as Maya Rangaswamy
- Charmila as Shakthi Sheshadri's grandmother
- Subhashree as vicenarian Pinky – Shakthi and Alamelu's best friend
  - Kushi R Jain as young Pinky
- Sruthy Jayan as Malar – Shakthi's neighbor
- Elavarasan Devarajan as Photographer Subramanium – Alamelu's father
- Narendran Subramaniam as Telugu hero along with Anjana Jayaprakash
- Aditya Anbu as Deepak – Pinky's brother

== Episodes ==
No.	Title	Directed by	Written by	Original release date
1	"The Breach"	Gautham Vasudev Menon	Reshma Ghatala	14 December 2019
As a brilliant, academically driven 15 year old who has no-one in her family to guide her, she tops the state in her tenth standard board exams.
2	"The Wall"	Prasath Murugesan	Reshma Ghatala	14 December 2019
A wall separates 12 year old Shakti from her best friend Pinky. But the wall isn't just a physical divide. Shakti slowly begins to understand the real distance between them.
3	"Circle of Light"	Gautham Vasudev Menon	Reshma Ghatala	14 December 2019
A reluctant debutante actress, Shakti Seshadri and ace director Shridhar Vasudevan, form an unlikely alliance.
4	"HIM"	Prasath Murugesan	Reshma Ghatala	14 December 2019
Meeting superstar GMR changes Shakti's life irreversibly and thus begins Shakti's journey to super stardom.
5	"Tipping Point"	Gautham Vasudev Menon, Prasath Murugesan	Reshma Ghatala	14 December 2019
A headstrong Shakti starts to find herself backed into a corner with GMR, as cracks begin to appear in their relationship.
6	"Home & Away"	Gautham Vasudev Menon, Prasath Murugesan	Reshma Ghatala	14 December 2019
As Shakti's home life spirals out of control, a romance sparks off during her Telugu film with director Chaitanya Reddy.
7	"The Dream"	Gautham Vasudev Menon	Reshma Ghatala	14 December 2019
Living a dream, with hope for marriage and a family still being a possibility, Shakthi dives headlong into her relationship with Chaitanya Reddy.
8	"The Nightmare"	Prasath Murugesan	Reshma Ghatala	14 December 2019
Shakthi and her mother begin to heal their fractured relationship, while bonding over shared misery.
9	"The Prophecy"	Prasath Murugesan	Reshma Ghatala	14 December 2019
Meeting GMR changes Shakthi's life yet again. This time plunging her into the world of Tamil Nadu politics.
10	"The Fall"	Gautham Vasudev Menon, Prasath Murugesan	Reshma Ghatala	14 December 2019
The death of GMR, leaves Shakthi with a decision to make. Will she choose greatness or happiness?
11	"The Rise"	Gautham Vasudev Menon	Reshma Ghatala	14 December 2019
At the funeral, a life altering incident sets Shakthi off on a trajectory that will have her replacing GMR as the face of the party. The Queen replaces the King.

== Production ==
=== Origin ===
Indian online OTT platform, MX Player announced plans of making a streaming television series about the life of former actress and politician J. Jayalalithaa, and hired director Gautham Vasudev Menon to direct the project in August 2018. It was touted to be a fourth biopic made in Tamil, which is based on the life of the former politician after A. L. Vijay, Priyadharshini and Bharathiraja were hired to direct the films. The script for the series was written by Reshma Ghatala, who worked as an executive producer in Menon's production house Ondraga Entertainment, while one of Menon's protege Prasath Murugesan was also signed to direct a few episodes. It was produced by Times Studio Originals, a subsidiary production house of The Times Group for web content, along with Gautham Menon's Ondraga Originals.

=== Writing ===
A source close to the director stated that "Menon has planned to direct three seasons of the biopic, which covers the life story of Jayalalithaa through thirty episodes. The first season is based on Jayalalithaa's entry to politics, which chronicles her life from 12 to 44 years. Based on the reception of the first season, the consecutive seasons will be planned. So far, many Tamil web series [sic] were criticized for the below par production values but Gautham clearly told his producers that he will not compromise with the quality. Gautham also got several unknown stories on Jayalalithaa through her close friends and associates."

In an interview with India Today, Menon stated that the series is a fictional story based on Anita Sivakumaran's novel Queen, which is based on the life of the politician and does not have any resemblance to her life, but instead Menon inspired the characters from the novel. Initially he planned to direct the biopic as a feature film, but due to the restrictions in censor board, Menon preferred to direct it as series. One of the production executives stated about Menon's interest in his foray through digital space, which is one of the reason as Menon, preferred to do a series about the politician. It is touted to be the second expensive streaming series produced in India, followed by the Netflix original series Sacred Games.

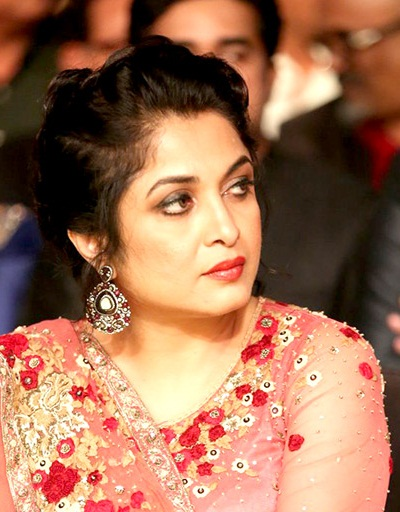
Ramya Krishnan plays the lead character Shakthi Sheshadri

=== Casting ===
Ramya Krishnan was cast in the leading role of Shakthi Sheshadri, a fictional character resembling Jayalalithaa, whereas Malayalam actor Indrajith Sukumaran was being roped to reprise the fictional character of former actor and politician M. G. Ramachandran as G. M. Ravichandran (GMR), and Vamsi Krishna being cast as Telugu actor Shobhan Babu's fictional character as Chaitanya Reddy. Actors Vineeth and Ranjith were also reported to be a part of the cast, which claimed to be false. It was further reported that Anikha Surendran and Anjana Jayaprakash were hired to reprise the younger versions of Shakthi Sheshadri. Sonia Agarwal was reported to play the younger version of Shakthi's mother Ranganayaki (fictional character of Jayalalithaa's mother Sandhya), with the older version of the character played by Tulasi. Vanitha Krishnachandran played the role of GMR's wife, Janani Devi, which is a fictional character of Janaki Ramachandran.And Viji Chandrasekhar played the role of Sakthi's Friend Suryakala, which is a fictional character of Sasikala.

=== Filming ===
==== Season 1 ====
The shooting of the first season took place on 24 December 2018 where a huge set is being erected at AVM Studios in Chennai. The sequences involving the popular interview between Simi Garewal and J. Jayalalithaa are being canned, and Lillete Dubey essayed the fictional version of the interviewer's role, as Simi Garewal turned down the offer. A significant portion of the film was completed before January 2019. On 29 March 2019, Menon announced that the shooting of the series had been wrapped.

==== Season 2 ====
In June 2020, Menon had stated that the pre-production works of the second season, with Reshma completed writing the script, however, the launch of the film got delayed due to the COVID-19 pandemic lockdown in India. In December 2020, it was reported that the second season of the series will go on floors from early 2021.

== Release ==
On 7 September 2019, the makers revealed the first look of Queen, depicting Ramya Krishnan's character addressing cadres at a political rally. A teaser trailer for the series was released on 1 December 2019 on YouTube, and the official trailer released on 5 December 2019, which coincides the death anniversary of Jayalalithaa. The first season which consists of eleven episodes was released in its entirety exclusively via the streaming service MX Player on 14 December 2019 in Tamil, Telugu, Malayalam and Hindi languages.

In May 2020, MX Player announced their collaboration with Zee Entertainment Enterprises, for the premiere of their streaming series, as shooting of the television series were affected due to the COVID-19 lockdown in India. The series premiered on the television channel Zee Tamil starting from 26 July 2020 at the 6:30 p.m. IST slot, and its Telugu version was premiered on Zee Telugu from 16 August. It was also reported that the second season will be also premiered on the television channel, with Zee TV procuring the rights for the second and third season of the series.

== Reception ==
=== Critical response ===
V. Lakshmi of The Times of India gave four out of five stars to the series and stated "There is a beautiful romance, some amazingly showcased tension between principle characters, but there are also those long pauses and overtly philosophical dialogues which would have been okay if we had more flesh to bite into. Some of the characters could have been given more perspective. Each episode is almost an hour-long, and that's clearly enough time to develop some of these characters and situations that are known to all." S. Subhakeerthana of The Indian Express gave three-and-a-half out of five and added "Queen works well as a web series [sic]. The suspense at the end of each episode keeps you invested in the characters. The actors are superb, the detailing is layered and great, and the chemistry so natural that it doesn't hinder the proceedings. The web series [sic] is largely riveting, and the craft is as unobtrusive as possible."

Ranjani Krishnakumar of Firstpost stated "If you can look past the biased hero-ing of a controversial figure, Queen is exceptional craft. Over eleven episodes, about 50 minutes each, Queen holds the attention of the viewer, in spite of its slow and lingering style." Manasa Rao of The News Minute reviewed "Rather than a factual retelling, much of the show is based on the anecdotal tales that have done the rounds of Tamil Nadu's political and film circles for decades and are now the overpowering ghosts in the biographical narratives about these leaders."

Sudhir Srinivasan of The New Indian Express stated "Queen is a rare-good Tamil web series [sic], but it would have helped us stop worrying about making inevitable comparisons with Jayalalithaa's life, about viewing the series with knowledge of the highlights of her life." Janani K of India Today wrote "Queen is a must-watch web series [sic] that is a hit because of its strong writing, brilliant performances and exceptional technicality." Prathyush Parasuraman of Film Companion South reviewed "MX Players’ 11 episode web series [sic] could have been a dramatic demand for justice. It ends up being reflective, sometimes, agonizingly so."

=== Accolades ===
Date of ceremony	Award	Category	Recipient(s) / nominee(s)	Result	Ref(s)
8 December 2020	Singapore's Asian Academy Creative Awards	Best Series	Queen	Won	

=== Controversies ===
On 13 September 2019, Jayalaithaa's nephew Deepak Jayakumar raised objection to the series, as the makers did not approve their consent of the family members to shoot the personal life of the politician. He said he would file a defamation case if the series went ahead without the family's permission. In November 2019, Deepa Jayakumar, the niece of Jayalalithaa, filed a suit to restrain the makers from promoting and releasing the series. She claimed that Jayalalithaa's family were not consulted about the project and that the series would affect the family's privacy. The Madras High Court subsequently called on the makers to respond to the allegations, and a notice was sent to Menon and A. L. Vijay, who planned to direct a biopic based on Jayalalithaa titled Thalaivi. On 3 January 2020, the court dismissed the plea to stall the release of the series, stating that the name of the main character is Sakthi Seshadri and, in the light of disclaimer that it is purely fictional and that any resemblance to real persons is coincidental and not intentional.

== See also ==
- J. Jayalalithaa
- Jayalalithaa filmography
- Thalaivi
