= J. Jayalalithaa filmography =

Filmography article

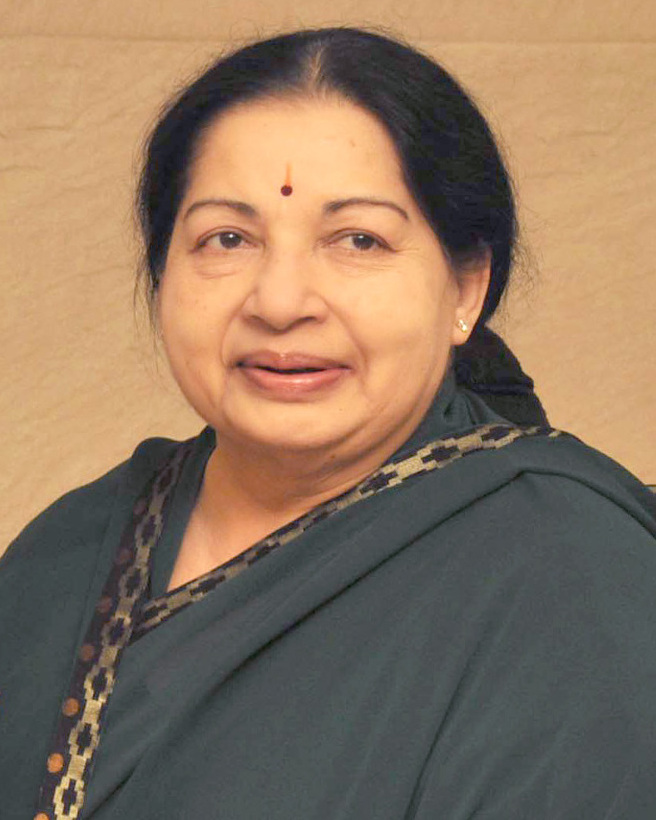
J. Jayalalithaa in 2015

This is the filmography of the late Indian actress and former Tamil Nadu chief minister J. Jayalalithaa who acted in over 125 films including Tamil, Telugu, Kannada, Hindi, Malayalam and English.

== Filmography ==
Key
| † | Denotes films that have not yet been released |

=== 1960s ===
| Year | Title | Role | Language | Notes | Ref. |
|---|---|---|---|---|---|
| 1961 | Sri Shaila Mahathme | Goddess Child Parvati | Kannada | Debut on-screen appearance | |
| 1961 | Epistle | | English | Released in 1966 | |
| 1962 | Man-Mauji | Lord Krishna | Hindi | Debut in Hindi as a child artiste; dances for a special three-minute song sequence | |
| 1963 | Constable Kooturu | Dancer | Telugu | Dancer in Andhamkosam Kannulu | |
| 1964 | Amarasilpi Jakkanna | Dancer | Telugu | Dancer in Mallepoolachendulanti (Guest Appearance) | |
| 1964 | Amarashilpi Jakanachari | Dancer | Kannada | Dancer in Malligeya Hoovinantha (Guest Appearance) | |
| 1964 | Chinnada Gombe | Rani | Kannada | Debut as a leading actress and in Kannada cinema | |
| 1964 | Mane Aliya | Meenakshi | Kannada | | |
| 1965 | Mavana Magalu | Saroja | Kannada | | |
| 1965 | Manushulu Mamathalu | Indira | Telugu | Debut in Telugu as a leading actress | |
| 1965 | Vennira Aadai | Shobha | Tamil | Debut in Tamil as a leading actress | |
| 1965 | Ayirathil Oruvan | Poongodi | Tamil | | |
| 1965 | Kanni Thaai | Sarasu | Tamil | | |
| 1965 | Nanna Kartavya | Shantha | Kannada | | |
| 1966 | Mugaraasi | Jaya | Tamil | | |
| 1966 | Thanipiravi | Radha | Tamil | | |
| 1966 | Aastiparulu | Radha | Telugu | | |
| 1966 | Chandhrodhayam | Devi | Tamil | | |
| 1966 | Kanni Pilla | | Telugu | | |
| 1966 | Badukuva Daari | | Kannada | | |
| 1966 | Gowri Kalyanam | Gowri | Tamil | | |
| 1966 | Major Chandrakanth | Vimala | Tamil | | |
| 1966 | Mani Magudam | Poongodi/Kalarani | Tamil | | |
| 1966 | Aame Evaru? | Sandhya | Telugu | | |
| 1966 | Kumari Penn | Shyamala | Tamil | 25th Film | |
| 1966 | Navaratri | Mental patient | Telugu | Guest appearance | |
| 1966 | Yaar Nee? | Santhya & Mohini (dual role) (Note: Jayalalithaa played dual roles in the film.) | Tamil | Madras Filmfans Association Awards for Best Actress. | |
| 1966 | Lorry Driver | | Tamil | | |
| 1966 | Nee | Jaya & Usha (dual role) | Tamil | | |
| 1966 | Gudachari 116 | Radha | Telugu | | |
| 1966 | Motor Sundaram Pillai | Nirmala | Tamil | | |
| 1967 | Thaikku Thalaimagan | Malathi | Tamil | | |
| 1967 | Naan | Geetha | Tamil | Madras Filmfans Association Awards for Best Actress. | |
| 1967 | Maadi Veettu Mappilai | Meena | Tamil | | |
| 1967 | Arasa Kattalai | Meghana | Tamil | | |
| 1967 | Chikkadu Dorakadu | Priyamvada Devi | Telugu | | |
| 1967 | Gopaludu Bhoopaludu | Rajini | Telugu | | |
| 1967 | Kaavalkaaran | Susheela | Tamil | | |
| 1967 | Kandhan Karunai | Valli | Tamil | | |
| 1967 | Raja Veetu Pillai | | Tamil | | |
| 1968 | Panakkara Pillai | Latha | Tamil | | |
| 1968 | Enga Oor Raja | Geetha | Tamil | | |
| 1968 | Pudhiya Bhoomi | Kannamma | Tamil | | |
| 1968 | Thaer Thiruvizha | Valliyammal | Tamil | | |
| 1968 | Brahmachari | Vasantha | Telugu | | |
| 1968 | Kudiyirundha Koyil | Jaya | Tamil | | |
| 1968 | Moondru Yezhuthu | Selvi | Tamil | | |
| 1968 | Muthu Chippi | Jaya | Tamil | Madras Filmfans Association Awards for Best Actress. | |
| 1968 | Kadhal Vaaganam | Vanidha | Tamil | | |
| 1968 | Kanavan | Rani Chidhambaram Pillai | Tamil | | |
| 1968 | Galatta Kalyanam | Lalitha | Tamil | | |
| 1968 | Sukha Dukhalu | Bala | Telugu | | |
| 1968 | Bommalattam | Geetha | Tamil | | |
| 1968 | Kannan En Kadhalan | Malliga | Tamil | Madras Filmfans Association Awards for Best Actress | |
| 1968 | Niluvu Dopidi | Radha | Telugu | | |
| 1968 | Baghdad Gajadonga | Nazeem | Telugu | | |
| 1968 | Oli Vilakku | Geetha | Tamil | | |
| 1968 | Izzat | Jhumki | Hindi | Only Hindi film as a leading actress (was paired with Dharmendra) | |
| 1968 | Ragasiya Police 115 | Neela | Tamil | | |
| 1968 | Andru Kanda Mugam | Kanchana | Tamil | 50th Film | |
| 1968 | Tikka Shankararaiah | Rani | Telugu | | |
| 1969 | Sri Rama Katha | Srimathi & Bhudevi (dual role) | Telugu | | |
| 1969 | Aadarsa Kutumbam | Saroja | Telugu | | |
| 1969 | Nam Naadu | Ammu | Tamil | | |
| 1969 | Adrushtavanthalu | Jaya | Telugu | | |
| 1969 | Deiva Magan | Nirmala | Tamil | | |
| 1969 | Gurudhakshanai | Kanni | Tamil | | |
| 1969 | Kathanayakudu | Jayalakshmi | Telugu | | |
| 1969 | Kadaladu Vadaladu | Madhumathi | Telugu | | |
| 1969 | Gandikota Rahasyam | Radha | Telugu | | |
| 1969 | Adimai Penn | Jeeva & Pavalavalli (dual role) | Tamil | | |

=== 1970s ===
| Year | Title | Role | Language | Notes | Ref. |
|---|---|---|---|---|---|
| 1970 | Anadhai Anandhan | Moghini | Tamil | | |
| 1970 | Maattukara Velan | Radha | Tamil | | |
| 1970 | Ali Baba 40 Dongalu | Marjiana | Telugu | | |
| 1970 | Thedi Vandha Mappillai | Uma Mageshwari | Tamil | | |
| 1970 | Enga Mama | Seetha | Tamil | | |
| 1970 | Engal Thangam | Kaladevi | Tamil | | |
| 1970 | Engirundho Vandhaal | Radha/Kamala | Tamil | Madras Filmfans Association Awards for Best Actress. | |
| 1970 | En Annan | Valli Ammal | Tamil | | |
| 1970 | Paadhukaappu | Valli | Tamil | | |
| 1971 | Sumathi En Sundari | Sumathi/Sundari | Tamil | Madras Filmfans Association Awards for Best Actress. | |
| 1971 | Aathi Parasakthi | Adi Parashakti | Tamil | 75th Film | |
| 1971 | Annai Velankanni | Mary | Tamil | | |
| 1971 | Savaale Samali | Sakunthala | Tamil | | |
| 1971 | Shri Krishna Vijayam | Vasundhara | Telugu | | |
| 1971 | Thanga Gopuram | Seetha & Herself (dual role) (Note: Jayalalithaa played both fictional and non-fictional roles in the film.) | Tamil | | |
| 1971 | Kumari Kottam | Kumari & Mayadhevi (dual role) | Tamil | | |
| 1971 | Oru Thaai Makkal | Radha | Tamil | | |
| 1971 | Neerum Neruppum | Kanchana | Tamil | | |
| 1972 | Annamitta Kai | Seetha | Tamil | | |
| 1972 | Bharya Biddalu | Radha | Telugu | | |
| 1972 | Pattikada Pattanama | Kalpana | Tamil | Filmfare Award for Best Actress - Tamil. | |
| 1972 | Sri Krishna Satya | Chandra Sena & Sathyabhama (dual role) | Telugu | Filmfare Award for Best Actress - Telugu. | |
| 1972 | Raja | Radha | Tamil | | |
| 1972 | Dharmam Enge | Roopa | Tamil | | |
| 1972 | Raman Thediya Seethai | Seetha | Tamil | | |
| 1972 | Needhi | Radha | Tamil | | |
| 1972 | Dhikku Theriyadha Kaattil | Vijaya | Tamil | | |
| 1972 | Shakthi Leelai | Periya Paalayathamman, Kannika (dual role) | Tamil | | |
| 1973 | Devudu Chesina Manushulu | Sujatha | Telugu | | |
| 1973 | Devudamma | Jyothi | Telugu | | |
| 1973 | Baghdad Perazhagi | Mumtaj | Tamil | | |
| 1973 | Doctor Babu | Gauri | Telugu | | |
| 1973 | Pattikaattu Ponnaiya | Kannamma | Tamil | Last pairing with MGR | |
| 1973 | Jesus | Salome | Malayalam | Only Malayalam film as a leading actress | |
| 1973 | Vandhale Magaraasi | Lakshmi & Rani (dual role) | Tamil | Tamil Nadu Cinema Fan Award for Best Actress. | |
| 1973 | Ganga Gowri | Ganga | Tamil | | |
| 1973 | Suryagandhi | Radha | Tamil | Filmfare Award for Best Actress - Tamil; Madras Filmfans Association Awards for Best Actress. | |
| 1974 | Anbai Thedi | Rani | Tamil | | |
| 1974 | Anbu Thangai | Radha | Tamil | | |
| 1974 | Thaai | Sivakami | Tamil | | |
| 1974 | Iru Deivangal | | Tamil | | |
| 1974 | Premalu Pellillu | Indira | Telugu | | |
| 1974 | Vairam | Rani | Tamil | | |
| 1974 | Thirumangalyam | Seetha | Tamil | 75th Tamil & official 100th film | |
| 1975 | Avalukku Ayiram Kangal | | Tamil | | |
| 1975 | Yarukkum Vetkam Illai | | Tamil | | |
| 1975 | Avanthan Manithan | Lalitha | Tamil | | |
| 1975 | Paattum Bharathamum | Lalitha | Tamil | | |
| 1975 | Cinema Paithiyam | As Herself | Tamil | Cameo Appearance portraying Rani Mangammal in a film shooting scene | |
| 1976 | Kanavan Manaivi | Chithra | Tamil | | |
| 1976 | Chitra Pournami | Rani | Tamil | | |
| 1977 | Unnai Suttrum Ulagam | Lakshmi | Tamil | Tamil Nadu Cinema Fan Award for Best Actress | |
| 1977 | Shri Krishna Leela | Satyabhama | Tamil | | |

=== 1980s ===
| Year | Title | Role | Language | Notes | Ref. |
|---|---|---|---|---|---|
| † | Maatran Thodatha Maaligai | | Tamil | Unreleased since 1980 | |
| † | Manipoor Maamiyar | | Tamil | Unreleased since 1980 | |
| 1980 | Nadhiyai Thedi Vandha Kadal | | Tamil | Last Tamil film as a leading actress | |
| 1980 | Nayakudu Vinayakudu | Vasantha | Telugu | Last Telugu film as a leading actress | |

=== 1990s ===
| Year | Title | Role | Language | Notes | Ref. |
|---|---|---|---|---|---|
| 1992 | Neenga Nalla Irukkanum | Chief Minister of Tamil Nadu | Tamil | Cameo appearance | |

== Discography ==
Key
| # | Denotes songs that have not yet been released |

| Year | Song | Movie | Co-singer(s) | Music |
|---|---|---|---|---|
| 1969 | Amma Endraal Anbu | Adimai Penn | | K. V. Mahadevan |
| 1970 | Challa Challani | Ali Baba 40 Dongalu | | Ghantasala |
| 1973 | Oh Meri Dilruba | Suryakanthi | T. M. Soundararajan | M. S. Viswanathan |
| 1973 | Naan Endraal Adhu | Suryakanthi | S. P. Balasubrahmanyam | M. S. Viswanathan |
| 1973 | Kangalil Aayiram | Vandhale Magaraasi | T. M. Soundararajan | Shankar–Ganesh |
| 1973 | Iru Maangani Pol | Vairam | S. P. Balasubrahmanyam | T. R. Pappa |
| 1973 | Chithira Mandapathil | Anbai Thedi | T. M. Soundararajan | M. S. Viswanathan |
| 1974 | Thirumangalyam Kollum Murai | Thirumangalyam | P. Susheela | M. S. Viswanathan |
| 1974 | Porkudathil Pongum Ezhir Suvaiyo | Thirumangalyam | | M. S. Viswanathan |
| 1974 | Ulagam Oru Naal Pirandhadhu | Thirumangalyam | | M. S. Viswanathan |
| 1977 | Madras Mail | Unnai Suttrum Ulagam | L. R. Easwari | Shankar Ganesh |
| 1979 | Maariyamma Muthu Maariyamma | Non-film Devotional Album | | Kunnakkudi Vaidyanathan |
| 1981 | Kaali Mahamaayi Karumaariyaanavale | Non-film Devotional Album | | Kunnakkudi Vaidyanathan |
| 1981 | Thanga Mayileri Varum Engal Vadivelavan | Non-film Devotional Album | | Kunnakkudi Vaidyanathan |
| # | Maarii Varum Ulaginiley | Non-film Devotional Album | | Kunnakkudi Vaidyanathan |
