= Sandhya (actress, born 1924) =

Indian actress (1924–1971)

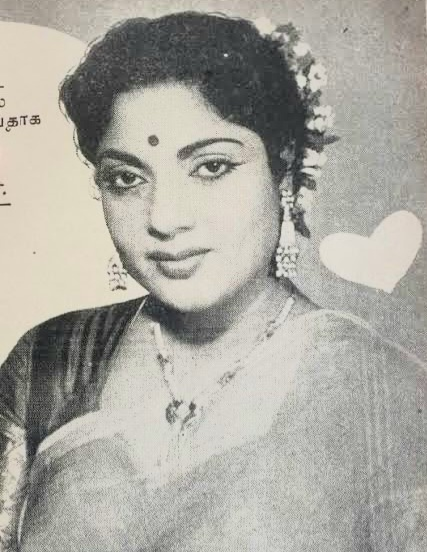
- Born: N. R. Vedhavalli; 1924; Srirangam, Trichy district, Madras Presidency, British Raj (present-day Tamil Nadu, India)
- Died: 1 November 1971 (aged 46–47); Madras (now Chennai), Tamil Nadu, India
- Other name: Veda
- Occupation: Actress
- Years active: 1954–1965
- Spouse: Jayaram (m. 1935; died 1950)
- Children: Jayakumar; Jayalalitha Jayaram
- Parent(s): N. Rangaswamy Iyengar (father); Kamalambal (mother)
- Relatives: Vidyavathi (Sister); Deepa Jayakumar (Granddaughter)

Vedhavalli (1924 – 1 November 1971), better known as Sandhya, was a South Indian film actress, who appeared in Tamil, Kannada and Telugu films. She adopted the screen name Sandhya for her acting career and was known for portraying character roles, often as the heroine’s sister or mother. Her younger sister, Vidyavathi, was also an actress. She was the mother of former Chief Minister of Tamil Nadu J. Jayalalithaa. She acted in Malaikkallan (1954), which starred M. G. Ramachandran and was written by M. Karunanidhi. She also appeared in films and was paired with N. T. Rama Rao in Mayabazar (1957), with Kalyan Kumar and Sivaji Ganesan in a few films like Bale Pandiya (1962).

== Early life and family ==
She was born as Vedhavalli into a Tamil Iyengar Brahmin family in Nellore. Her father, Rangaswamy Iyengar, moved to Mysore from Srirangam to work with Hindustan Aeronautics Limited. She had one brother and two sisters—Ambujavalli and Padmavalli. Sandhya and her siblings along with their grandparents initially lived in East Chittirai Street in Srirangam. Later, her father Rangaswamy, who was a practicing lawyer based in Karur from the 1910s to the 1930s, purchased a house from a Diwan in the same street and named it "Komala Vilas Vedha Nilayam". She shared common maternal lineage with K. Parasaran, a former Attorney General of India. Her maternal family roots trace back to Sakkaravala Nallur, near Devipattinam in Ramanathapuram district. Later at this location, on 4 April 1984, her daughter Jayalalithaa donated ₹1.65 lakh from her personal funds to establish the "Annai Sandhya Memorial Nutritious Meal Centre" in memory of her mother, Sandhya.

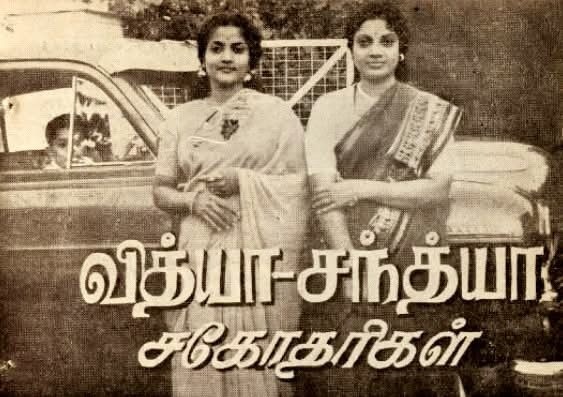
Sandhya (right) with her younger sister Vidyavathi (left) in front of a 1952 model Vauxhall Velox, as featured in a magazine, 1954.

Vedhavalli was married as a second wife to Jayaram, son of Narasimhan Rangachari, in 1935, at the age of 11, while she was studying in sixth grade. He was a native of Nangavaram, in the erstwhile united Trichy district (now part of Karur district) and later, a Secretary in Mysore Palace and a lawyer of the Royal family of Mysore. The couple had two children: a son, Jayakumar in 1946, and a daughter, Jayalalithaa in 1948. Her husband was a lawyer but never worked and squandered most of the family's wealth. Sandhya was trained in various pursuits, including reading, vocal music, veena, violin, swimming, tennis, and cross-country cycling. Following the death of her husband in 1950 at the age of 42, the widowed Vedhavalli returned to her father's home in Bangalore in 1950 and began working as a secretary in a company at the age of 26. Vedhavalli learned shorthand and typewriting to take up a clerical position as a stenotypist in the Directorate of Agriculture under Government of Mysore to help support the family in 1950.

== Later career ==
Her younger sister Ambujavalli had moved to Madras, working as an air hostess and later started acting in dramas and films like Alibabavum 40 Thirudargalum, En Veedu and Chandirani using the screen name "Vidyavathy". On Ambujavalli's insistence, Vedhavalli also relocated to Madras and resided with her sister from 1952. Vedhavalli worked in a commercial firm in Madras and began dabbling in acting in 1953 under the screen name Sandhya. She made her film debut as a villainess in the 1954 Tamil film Karkottai. Jayalalithaa remained under the care of her mother's sister Padmavalli and maternal grandparents from 1950 to 1958 in Mysore. She attended Bishop Cotton Girls' School, Bangalore. Sandhya also acted in a few Kannada films. After attaining a modest level of financial stability, she moved into a reasonably comfortable rented house on Fourth Main Road in Gandhi Nagar, Adyar to raise her children. It was here that Jayalalithaa and her brother Jayakumar spent their childhood. Following her growing recognition in cinema, Sandhya later relocated to Sivagnanam Street in T. Nagar. Sandhya nurtured Jayalalithaa into a disciplined and accomplished individual, whom she and later co-stars and friends referred to as Ammu; training her in dance from the age of three, later teaching her piano, and often taking her along to film shooting locations.

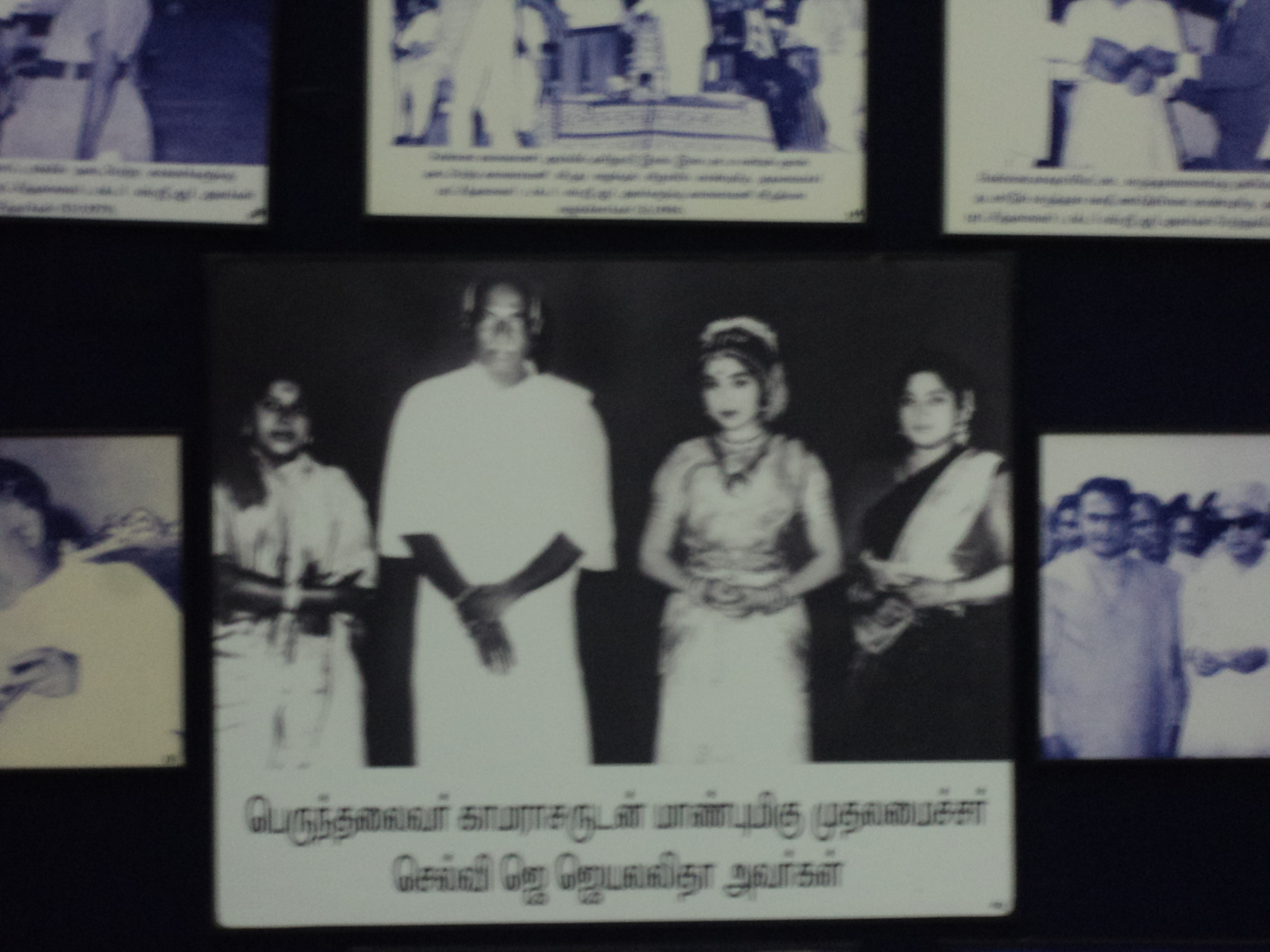
Sandhya (right) along with Madras Chief Minister K. Kamaraj, her daughter Jayalalithaa (middle) and dance teacher K. J. Sarasa during an Arangetram

During a visit to Madras, she was accompanied by Jayalalithaa to Shri Shaila Mahathme film set, where she was asked to replace an absent child actress. Sandhya initially refused but later consented, and Jayalalithaa agreed to act on the condition that she would not be compelled again. In 1964, Sandhya accompanied her daughter Jayalalithaa to the 100th-day celebrations of the film Karnan. During this period, filmmaker B. R. Panthulu signed Jayalalithaa to play the female lead in his Kannada film Chinnada Gombe, marking her early entry into cinema. When director Vedantam Raghavayya approached Sandhya to cast her daughter in a Kannada film Nanna Kartavya, she was initially reluctant to let her, then a sixth-grade student, play a young widow at the start of her career. Sandhya eventually agreed on the condition that filming be limited to weekends and school holidays. Jayalalithaa received further opportunities to act in Kannada films, through which she was introduced as a lead actress by director C. V. Sridhar in the film Vennira Aadai, leading Jayalalithaa to forgo her college ambitions after briefly attending Stella Maris College. Subsequently, her role opposite M. G. Ramachandran in Aayirathil Oruvan brought her instant fame. Within a few years, she became one of the leading actresses in South Indian cinema. Thereafter, Sandhya withdrew from acting and largely remained at home, managing her daughter’s film commitments.

In the late 1960s, when her daughter Jayalalithaa was at the peak of her fame, Sandhya developed the ambition of building a grand residence for her daughter’s future and bought a plot on 1 July 1967 at a cost of ₹ 1.32 lakh, measuring around 24,000 sq. feet (10 grounds) with a built-up area of 21,662 sq. feet in Teynampet area of Madras (now Chennai). The design of the house was revised multiple times to suit Jayalalithaa’s preferences before it was finally constructed in its present form. The residence, later known as the Poes Garden house, was thus built with great care and aspiration for her daughter’s future. During the "Engirundho Vandhaal" (1970) film shoot, Sandhya approached her daughter Jayalalithaa to discuss purchasing sarees for relatives in connection with their house’s groundbreaking ceremony. A minor disagreement arose between them, and Jayalalithaa later expressed regret, recalling that she had uttered an inauspicious remark to her mother during the exchange.

== Illness, death, and aftermath ==
My Mother Was Everything to Me

“When we sigh about our troubles, It doubles everyday. When we laugh about our troubles, It is bubble blown away. Let these words of love soothe your woeful eyelid, But not your aching heart. Mummy rests in peace to see her darling kid, To rise to sky in maternal art.”

“Among the condolence letters I received after my mother’s death, this gave me the greatest comfort.”

— Jayalalithaa, Ananda Vikatan, Sunday, 19 December 1971

Sandhya did not live to witness the housewarming ceremony of the home she had envisioned, which remained a significant personal loss in Jayalalithaa’s life. By mid-1971, the construction of the house had been completed. On 31 October 1971, Sandhya suddenly fell ill after vomiting blood and was admitted to K.J. Hospital in Poonamallee. Jayalalithaa was at the shooting spot in Bandipur National Park for Dhikku Theriyadha Kaattil (1972 film). She died the following day, on 1 November 1971 at the age of 47, despite medical treatment. As per her will, she bequeathed to Jayalalithaa her share in the properties of "Natayakala Niketan", along with a land and building in Poes Garden, Chennai, a house in Hyderabad, and agricultural lands measuring about 10.2 acres in Ranga Reddy district, including a grape garden, farmhouse, and servants’ quarters purchased in 1968. The will also included an additional 3.5 acres of land in Basheerabad village, Andhra Pradesh.

The housewarming ceremony of the Poes Garden residence was held on 15 May 1972. Sandhya, who had envisioned celebrating the occasion with her daughter, had passed away by then and was present only in a photograph displayed in the house. Jayalalithaa named the residence “Veda Nilayam,” after her mother’s given name, Vedhavalli. The event was attended by several prominent figures of Tamil Nadu, except M. G. Ramachandran, who had attended the groundbreaking ceremony, as he was busy with the scheduled shooting in Kashmir for Ulagam Sutrum Valiban film. Cho Ramaswamy, a close family friend and one of Jayalalithaa’s companions from her younger years, was also not present in the ceremony. Sandhya had traditionally conducted family functions in his presence, and Jayalalithaa reportedly expected him to attend the occasion. Despite being in the city, Cho did not attend the ceremony. When asked about his absence, he later wrote a detailed letter explaining that he felt slighted for not being personally invited, expressing regret for the misunderstanding. After her sudden demise, Sandhya's mother Kamalambal lived along with Jayalalithaa at 'Veda Nilayam' as a support and died in 1973.

== Filmography ==
Year	Title	Role	Language	Notes	Ref.
1954	Karkottai		Tamil	Debut on-screen appearance	
1954	Malaikkallan	Chinni	Tamil		
1954	Natashekhara		Kannada		
1954	Vipra Narayana	Madhuravani	Telugu		
1954	Ratha Paasam		Tamil	Acted along with sister Vidyavathi	
1955	Sodari		Kannada		
1955	Manoradham		Tamil	Dubbed version of Natashekhara	
1956	Tenali Raman	Tirumalambal	Tamil		
1956	Tenali Ramakrishna	Tirumala Devi	Telugu		
1957	Samaya Sanjeevi		Tamil		
1957	Mayabazar	Rukmini	Telugu Tamil		
1957	Premada Putri		Kannada		
1957	Preme Daivam		Telugu		
1958	Sampoorna Ramayanam	Mandodari	Tamil		
1958	Pillai Kaniyamudhu	Gunavathi	Tamil		
1958	Chenchu Lakshmi	Queen of the Chenchus	Tamil and Telugu		
1959	Krishna Leelalu	Rohini	Telugu		
1959	Minnal Veeran		Tamil		
1959	Manimekalai	Madhavi	Tamil		
1959	Maragatham	Karpagavalli	Tamil		
1959	Jagajyothi Basveshwara	Queen	Kannada		
1959	Mahishasura Mardini	Goddess Chamundeswari/Tripura Sundari	Kannada	First major Pan-India film	
1960	Baghdad Thirudan	Gulshad	Tamil		
1960	Padikkadha Medhai	Thyagu's wife	Tamil		
1960	Ranadheera Kanteerava	Queen Lakshammanni	Kannada		
1960	Sri Venkateswara Mahatyam	Goddess Saraswati	Telugu		
1960	Vimala	Rajyalakshmi Devi	Telugu		
1960	Nitya Kalyanam Paccha Thoranam	Sushila	Telugu		
1961	Bharya Bhartalu	Kanakam	Telugu		
1961	Nagarjuna	Parvati	Telugu		
1961	Shri Shaila Mahathme	Queen Sathyavati	Kannada	Acted along with Jayalalithaa	
1961	Thayilla Pillai	Sushila	Tamil		
1961	Vijayanagarada Veeraputhra	Queen	Telugu		
1962	Sarada	Sarada's mother	Tamil		
1962	Swarna Gowri	Goddess Parvati	Telugu		
1962	Bale Pandiya	Kanagam	Tamil		
1962	Kathiruntha Kangal	Thilagam	Tamil		
1962	Kula Gotralu	Anasuya	Telugu		
1962	Deivathin Deivam	Kanmani's mother	Tamil		
1963	Iruvar Ullam	Nagammal	Tamil		
1963	Aasai Alaigal	Bhakyavathi	Tamil		
1963	Kulamagal Radhai	Vanaja	Tamil		
1963	Gowri	Dhakshayini	Kannada		
1963	Lava Kusa	Shanta	Telugu		
1963	Punarjanma	Janaki	Telugu		
1963	Nartanasala	Sudeshna	Telugu		
1964	Karnan	Veni	Tamil		
1964	Chinnada Gombe	Rani's mother	Kannada	Acted along with Jayalalithaa	
1964	Mane Aliya	Meenakshi's mother	Kannada	Acted along with Jayalalithaa	
1964	Manchi Manishi	Baby's mother	Telugu		
1965	Poojaikku Vandha Malar	Ravi and Chitra's mother	Tamil		
1965	Santhi	Santhanam's mother	Tamil		

== In popular culture ==
In the 2019 web series Queen, Tulasi Shivamani and Sonia Agarwal portrayed Ranganayaki, the fictional adaptation of Sandhya. In the Tamil film Thalaivii (2021), Sandhya was portrayed by Bhagyashree.
