= M. P. Sivam =

- Born: Madhilagathuveedu Paramasivam; Kizhakku Yakkarai, Palakkad, Kerala
- Occupations: poet, musician, lyricist

M. P. Sivam (M. Parameswaran Nair) is an Indian stage and film artist. He has worked as a teacher who trained stage artistes. He was also a poet and a musician.

== About ==
His full name is Madhilagathuveedu ParamaSivam (M. Parameswaran Nair). His birthplace is Kizhakku Yakkarai, a village in Palakkad, Kerala.

He married Sarojini Amma from Puthan house Mannalur. He has 5 children - Jyothi Kumar, Premavathi, Jayasree, Yamuna Devi, Nalina Kumari. Grand son - Suresh Babu, Sujatha, Arun, Resmi, Prajod, Sreenath puthan, Sreejith Puthan.

Though his mother tongue was Malayalam he was very proficient in Tamil. He worked as a Harmonium artiste in Yadhaartham Ponnusamy Pillai's Madurai Bala Gana Sabha. He wrote the lyrics and taught drama artistes to sing them.

Music Director K. V. Mahadevan's assistant Pughazhendhi is a relative of M. P. Sivam. Pughazhendhi's brother-inlaw is Sivam's brother. He taught music to Pughazhendhi and introduced him to K. V. Mahadevan.

== Career ==
He started his film career as a lyricist. He wrote 8 out of the 14 songs in Kumari that was released in 1952 and featured M. G. Ramachandran in the lead role.

Sivam wrote all the 12 lyrics to Madana Mohini that was released in 1953. K. V. Mahadevan sang three songs in this film. The song Kannodu Kannaai Rahasiyam Pesi was a hit.

In Nallakalam released in 1954, he wrote 5 out of 8 songs. The song Vazhvu Malarndhu Manam Veesiduthe sung by R. Balasaraswathi Devi was a hit.

Out of 9 songs in Magathala Nattu Mary that was released in 1957, he wrote 5 songs. The first Tamil duet song sung by S. Janaki, Kannukku Naere Minnidum Tharai was penned by M. P. Sivam and included in this film. Co-singer was P. B. Srinivas.

M. P. Sivam wrote dialogues together with Puratchidasan and V. S. Jagannathan for the film Nallakalam released in 1954.

== Singers ==
The following singers sang his songs in the films

Female singers

- Jikki
- K. Rani
- P. Leela
- A. P. Komala
- N. L. Ganasaraswathi
- R. Balasaraswathi Devi
- Soolamangalam Rajalakshmi

Female singers (Contd.)

- K. Jamuna Rani
- S. Janaki
- A. Andal
- Sarojini
- Kasthuri
- K. R. Lakshmi

Male singers

- A. M. Rajah
- P. B. Srinivas
- K. V. Mahadevan
- A. M. Appadurai
- K. R. Sellamuthu
- S. V. Ponnusamy

== Filmography ==
- Kumari (1952)
- Madana Mohini (1953)
- Nallakalam (1954)
- Nalla Veedu (1956)
- Alavudheenum Arputha Villakkum (1957)
- Magathala Nattu Mary (1957)

== Devotional songs ==
As opportunities failed in Tamil films, he went back to Kerala. However, he continued to write devotional songs in Tamil.

His devotional songs include Kandhan Tiruneeranindhaal, Muruganai Kooppittu Muraiyidda Perukku, Thithikkum Thaen Paagum sung by T. M. Soundararajan.
