= Andal (singer) =

Indian singer

Andal (19 June 1939 – 2 July 2016) was an Indian playback singer who sang mainly in Tamil-language.

== Childhood ==
Born at Alwarthirunagiri in Tuticorin District, Tiruchendur taluk of Tamil Nadu in 1939. Her father was Azhagiyasingham Iyengar. Her father was a well-to-do person and a lover of music. He had a gramophone and many records (discs) at home. While he plays the records, Andal will listen to the songs intently and acquired the talent of singing exactly the same way. Noticing her interest, her father sent her to a music teacher in the village. She learned many Kritis from him. Later, she was trained by N. C. Vasanthakokilam in Chennai until the early death of Vasanthakokilam.

== Playback singer ==
Andal began her career as a playback singer singing for stage plays. She had worked for drama companies - TKS Drama troupe, R. S. Manohar's National Theatres, Sahasranamam's Seva Stage and for drama groups owned by Komal Swaminathan, T. S. Durairaj, V. K. Ramasamy and S. S. Rajendran.
A song "Vaanambaadigal Polae" she sang with A. M. Raja for the stage drama Kalvanin Kadhali staged by TKS was released as a gramophone record and was broadcast over Radio Ceylon. It was a hit.
She started playback singing for films in 1954 with a song in Ponvayal.

== List of songs ==
Year	Film	Song	Music director
1954	Ponvayal	Vaanga Vaanga Maappille	Thuraiyur Rajagopal Sarma & R. Rajagopal
1954	Nallakalam	Kolaagalamaaga	K. V. Mahadevan
1954	Nallakalam	Vaazhvin kadamaiyai	K. V. Mahadevan
1956	Kudumba Vilakku	Ennum Manadhinil	T. R. Pappa
1959	Naalu Veli Nilam	Nambinar Keduvadhillai	K. V. Mahadevan & M. K. Athmanathan

== Personal life ==
When Andal was gaining popularity in playback singing in films, she got married. Her family life turned to be a disaster and she could not sing any more. Even after separation from her husband, she lived a secluded life away from limelight. She taught music to her daughter Kamala and to her son Rajbala both of whom later took careers in the music field. She also trained students in Carnatic music.

== Death ==
Andal died on 2 July 2016 in chennai due to old age.

== Bibliography ==
- Vamanan (December 2014). Thirai Isai Kalanjiyam – Part 1 (in Tamil) (1st ed.). Chennai: Manivasagar Publishers 044 25361039. pp. 762–765.
