= Thalaivii =

2021 Indian film by A. L. Vijay

- Theatrical release poster
- Directed by: A. L. Vijay
- Screenplay by: V. Vijayendra Prasad
- Based on: Thalaivii by Ajayan Bala
- Produced by: Vishnu Vardhan Induri; Shailesh R Singh; Brinda Prasad
- Starring: Kangana Ranaut; Arvind Swamy; Nassar; Raj Arjun; Samuthirakani
- Cinematography: Vishal Vittal
- Edited by: Ballu Saluja
- Music by: G. V. Prakash Kumar
- Production companies: Zee Studios; Vibri Motion Pictures; Karma Media and Entertainment; Gothic Entertainment; Sprint Films
- Distributed by: Zee Studios
- Release date: 10 September 2021
- Running time: 153 minutes
- Country: India
- Languages: Tamil; Hindi
- Budget: ₹100 crore
- Box office: ₹4.98 crore

Thalaivii (transl. Female leader) is a 2021 Indian biographical drama film based on the life of actress and politician J. Jayalalithaa. Directed by A. L. Vijay and written by V. Vijayendra Prasad, with dialogues by Madhan Karky (Tamil) and Rajat Arora (Hindi), it was produced by Vishnu Vardhan Induri and Shailesh R Singh. The film stars Kangana Ranaut as Jayalalithaa, Arvind Swamy as M. G. Ramachandran, Nassar as M. Karunanidhi, and Raj Arjun and Samuthirakani as R. M. Veerappan in the Hindi and Tamil versions, respectively.

Shot simultaneously in Tamil and Hindi, the film features an ensemble cast including Bhagyashree, Madhoo, Thambi Ramaiah, and Shamna Kasim. The music and background score were composed by G. V. Prakash Kumar.

The film was officially launched on Jayalalithaa's birth anniversary on 24 February 2019. It was initially titled Thalaivi in Tamil and Jaya in Hindi, but was later released under the title Thalaivii in both languages.

Principal photography began on 10 November 2019 and was completed in December 2020.

The film's release was postponed due to a rise in COVID-19 cases and lockdowns in Maharashtra. It was later released on 10 September 2021.

Made on a budget of ₹100 crore, the film grossed ₹4.98 crore and was a box office bomb. The film received mixed reviews, with praise for Ranaut and Swamy's performances but criticism for the screenplay. It received four Filmfare Award nominations, including Best Actress for Ranaut, which was later revoked.

== Plot ==
In 1989, Jayalalithaa (nicknamed Jaya), a member of the Tamil Nadu Legislative Assembly representing the opposition AIADMK, questions Chief Minister M. Karunanidhi of the DMK over allegations of corruption, arrests, and surveillance against her party. She demands his resignation and praises former Chief Minister M. G. Ramachandran (MGR) as a leader who truly served the people. Members of the ruling party question her relationship with MGR, leading to a scuffle in which she is assaulted and humiliated. Comparing herself to Draupadi, Jaya vows to return to the assembly only after becoming Chief Minister. The incident attracts widespread media attention and public sympathy.

The narrative then shifts to 1965, when MGR is at the peak of his film career. Producer R. M. Veerappan dismisses an actress to maintain MGR’s public image. Jaya, then 16, is encouraged by her mother Sandhya, a former actress, to enter films. She replaces Savitri in a film, initially displaying reluctance and arrogance. However, after witnessing MGR’s compassion on set and understanding her mother’s intentions, she becomes more committed. The film succeeds, and Jaya and MGR go on to star in several films together, developing a close bond. Veerappan attempts to distance Jaya from MGR, but she resists. Despite their closeness, Jaya feels sidelined due to MGR’s marriage to Janaki.

Following an incident in which MGR is shot and hospitalised, Veerappan sidelines Jaya from future projects. Feeling betrayed, she briefly collaborates with MGR’s rival Sivaji Ganesan. MGR later reconciles with her, and they resume working together.

MGR enters politics alongside Karunanidhi under Annadurai, but is eventually expelled from the party. He later forms his own party, the AIADMK. Meanwhile, Jaya is deeply affected by her mother’s death and distances herself from MGR. After Annadurai’s death, MGR becomes Chief Minister. Jaya gradually transitions away from films and eventually accepts an invitation to perform at a government event in Madurai, where MGR encourages her to enter politics. Though initially reluctant, she later agrees.

Jaya becomes actively involved in public welfare, particularly promoting the midday meal scheme. Her efforts earn her the popular title “Amma”. She rises within the party, becoming its propaganda secretary and later a Member of Parliament. During a visit to New Delhi, she is initially denied access to Prime Minister Indira Gandhi, but later impresses national leaders with her speech in the Rajya Sabha. She facilitates an alliance with the Congress, which leads to tensions within her party.

After Indira Gandhi’s assassination, Rajiv Gandhi requests Jaya to campaign during MGR’s absence due to medical treatment in the United States. Her efforts help sustain the party’s influence. Upon MGR’s return, he acknowledges her contributions. However, before they can reconcile fully, MGR dies in 1987. At his funeral, Jaya is publicly mistreated by supporters of Janaki. The AIADMK subsequently splits into factions supporting Janaki and Jaya, allowing Karunanidhi to return to power.

Returning to 1989, Veerappan apologises to Jaya and becomes her supporter. In 1990, she survives an attack on her life. Despite political challenges, she continues campaigning vigorously. Following Rajiv Gandhi’s assassination, elections are held, and her party wins a decisive victory.

Jaya returns to the legislative assembly as the Chief Minister of Tamil Nadu, fulfilling her earlier vow and consolidating her leadership within the party.

== Cast ==
- Kangana Ranaut as J. Jayalalithaa (Jaya), also known as Amma
- Arvind Swamy as M. J. Ramachandran (based on M. G. Ramachandran)
- Nassar as M. Karuna (based on M. Karunanidhi)
- Raj Arjun as R. N. Veerappan (based on R. M. Veerappan; Hindi version)
- Samuthirakani as R. N. Veerappan (based on R. M. Veerappan; Tamil version)
- Bharathi Kannan as C. N. Annadurai
- Bhagyashree as Sandhya, Jaya's mother
- Madhoo as V. N. Janaki Ramachandran, Ramachandran's wife
- Radha Ravi as M. R. Radha
- Thambi Ramaiah as Madhavan
- Poorna as Sasikala (based on V. K. Sasikala)
- A. R. Manikandan as Moorthy, R. N. Veerappan's manager
- Bharath Reddy as an AIADMK party worker
- Vidya Pradeep as an actress
- Flora Jacob as Indira Gandhi, Prime Minister of India
- Rajiv Kumar as Rajiv Gandhi, Prime Minister of India
- Rajiv Kumar Aneja as L. K. Advani, Leader of the Opposition in Rajya Sabha
- Shanmugarajan as Valampuri John
- Virral Patel as Raja Kannappan
- Jayakumar as a composite character inspired by Durai Murugan and Vaiko
- Nitya Shetty as a trainee doctor
- Phanindra Gollapalli as a Congress Member of Parliament in the Rajya Sabha
- Regina Cassandra as Saroja Devi (cameo appearance)

== Production ==
=== Development ===
Vishnu Vardhan Induri decided to make a film based on the life of AIADMK's former general secretary J. Jayalalithaa, who served six times as the chief minister of Tamil Nadu for more than fourteen years between 1991 and 2016. Producer Vishnu Vardhan Induri approached A. L. Vijay in early 2018, to direct the film. Vijay and Vishnu researched extensively for eight months to come up with the story. To make the writing more effective, Vishnu brought in V. Vijayendra Prasad for the script who further developed the script.

The film will focus on the journey of a woman who has been successful in a male-dominated world. The most beautiful thing about her is that she has a powerful mind and is very strong willed; she is an inspiration for many. There will be honesty in the biopic, not drama.

— A. L. Vijay, on directing Thalaivi in an interview with The Times of India.

The Project was launched on 24 February 2019 (Jayalalithaa's birth anniversary), under the title Thalaivii, the makers had approached Kangana Ranaut to play Jayalalithaa's role, as Vijay stated that her role will be apt for the film. Ranaut officially confirmed her part in March 2019, with the shooting being supposed to held in July 2019.

As per Kangana, there will be two parts of the film. The first part focuses on life of Jayalalilthaa from 16 to 40. There will be a second film, where her life from 41 to her death in 2016 will get covered. In November 2019, it was revealed that the biopic will be shot simultaneously in Hindi, Tamil, and Telugu. However, the Telugu version was dropped in favor of a dubbed release.

=== Casting and characters ===
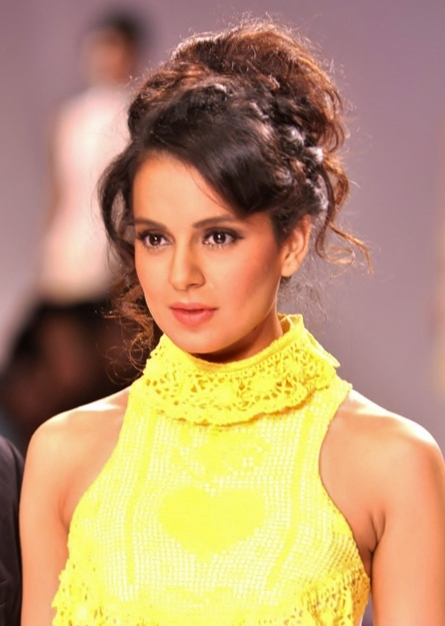
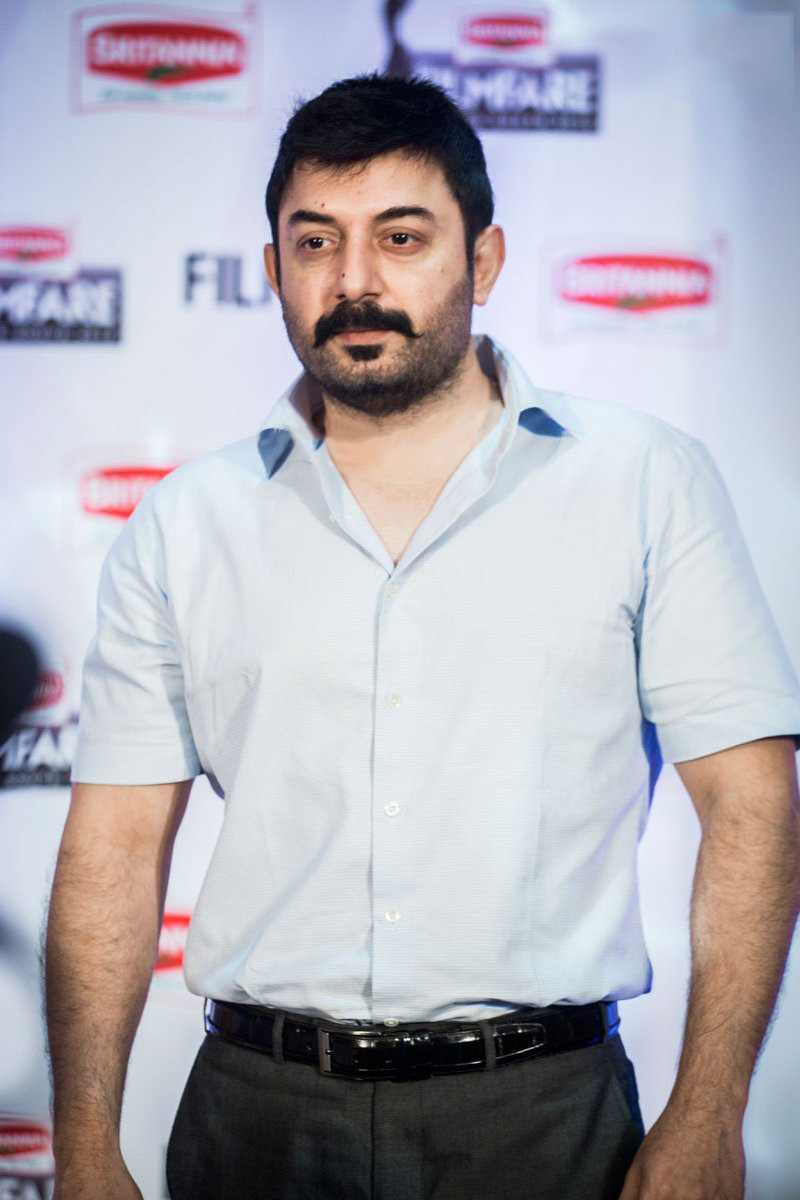
Kangana Ranaut (left) and Arvind Swami (right) performed the roles of J. Jayalalithaa and M. G. Ramachandran, respectively.

Ranaut started preparing for her role in May 2019. In September 2019, prosthetic specialist Jason Collins, who worked on Captain Marvel (2019), was hired to design Ranaut's looks and it has been reported that she will sport four looks in the film. Both Ranaut and Vijay headed to Los Angeles to undergo the prosthetic sessions. Ranaut also trained under dance master Gayathri Raghuram to choreograph Bharatanatyam sequences for this film so as to suit for the character. The second round of look tests were held during October, which led Ranaut to spend nearly two months for the preparation of her role. She also gained 20 kilos for her role in the film.

In October 2019, Arvind Swami was roped in to play the role of M. G. Ramachandran. The very same month, the makers approached Prakash Raj to play the role of DMK politician M. Karunanidhi, although he donned a similar character inspiring the politician in the 1997 film Iruvar. Vijay Deverakonda was reported to play the role of Sobhan Babu, Jayalalithaa's close aide, before Jisshu Sengupta was finalised; however, this role was later dropped. Similarly, Priyamani was approached to play V. K. Sasikala, but, she could not allot dates for the film and the role went to Poorna; Madhoo essayed the role of V. N. Janaki.

=== Filming ===
Principal shooting began in Mysore on 10 November 2019. A huge set for a song sequence was erected at a studio in Chennai, and began filming on 1 February 2020, featuring Ranaut in a Bharatanatyam attire. During the song shoot Ashwiny Iyer Tiwari, whom Ranaut worked in Panga (2020) made a visit to the sets. Production was halted due to the COVID-19 pandemic, with major portions being filmed, Ranaut stated not to resume shoot as the climax scene requires more than 3000 extras and is to be made on a large scale. After multiple delays, the makers filmed the climax scene in mid-November 2020, with production being completed in December 2020.

== Music ==
Thalaivii

Soundtrack album by G. V. Prakash Kumar
- Released: 10 September 2021 (All languages)
- Recorded: 2020
- Genre: Feature film soundtrack
- Length: 25:35 (All languages)
- Languages: Tamil; Hindi
- Labels: Lahari Music; T-Series

G. V. Prakash Kumar chronology
Vanakkam Da Mappilei (2021)	Thalaivii (2021)	Bachelor (2021)

The music for the film is composed by G. V. Prakash Kumar and lyrics written by Madhan Karky (Tamil version) and Irshad Kamil (Hindi version) and Sira Sri, Bhaskarabhatla, Ramajogayya Sastry, Krishna Chaitanya and Kalyana Chakravarthy (Telugu dubbed version). The music rights are acquired by Lahari Music and T-Series.

All lyrics are written by Madhan Karky.

Tamil
No.	Title	Singer(s)	Length
1.	"Mazhai Mazhai"	Saindhavi Prakash	3:22
2.	"Unthan Kangalil Ennadiyo"	Nakul Abhyankar, Niranjana Ramanan	3:28
3.	"Kannum Kannum Pesa Pesa"	Saindhavi Prakash	4:00
4.	"Unakaana Ulagam"	K. S. Harisankar, Ananya Bhat	5:03
5.	"Vaa Thalaivii"	Nakul Abhyankar	5:48
6.	"Tugalai Tugalai"	G. V. Prakash Kumar	3:54
Total length:			25:35

All lyrics are written by Irshad Kamil.

Hindi
No.	Title	Singer(s)	Length
1.	"Chali Chali"	Saindhavi Prakash	3:22
2.	"Teri Aankhon Mein"	Armaan Malik, Prajakta Shukre	3:28
3.	"Nain Bandhe Naino Se"	Saindhavi Prakash	4:00
4.	"Hai Kamaal"	Shankar Mahadevan, Parul Mishra	5:03
5.	"Aa Thalaivii"	Amit Mishra	5:48
6.	"Tukuda Tukuda"	G. V. Prakash Kumar	3:54
Total length:			25:35

Telugu (dubbed)
No.	Title	Lyrics	Singer(s)	Length
1.	"Ilaa Ilaa"	Sira Sri	Saindhavi Prakash	3:22
2.	"Nee Kannullo Emunnado"	Bhaskarabhatla	Nakul Abhyankar, Niranjana Ramanan	3:28
3.	"Nandhalala"	Ramajogayya Sastry	Saindhavi Prakash	4:00
4.	"Kumari Idhi Nee Daari"	Ramajogayya Sastry	Anurag Kulkarni, Ananya Bhat	5:03
5.	"Ra ThalaiviI"	Krishna Chaitanya	Anurag Kulkarni	5:48
6.	"Visirey Visirey"	Kalyana Chakravarthy	Nakul Abhyankar	3:54
Total length:				25:35

== Marketing and release ==
The first look and teaser released on 23 November 2019, received positive response praising Ranaut's transformation. However, a section of audience expressed disappointment over the "terrible" prosthetics and initiated a troll fest through Twitter. Some netizens claimed that any other actor should have done better in place of Ranaut and further upset that she could end up "tarnishing Jayalalithaa's image through this film". However, Ranaut's sister Rangoli Chandel defended the actress, saying that "those who got eyes can see the fantastic work done by the prosthetic team".

The film was initially scheduled for a theatrical release on 26 June 2020, but was postponed due to the COVID-19 pandemic in India. In June 2020, the team announced that the film will have a theatrical release and may not have a direct OTT release. The film was then scheduled for release theatrically on 23 April 2021 in Hindi, Tamil, and Telugu languages. As of April 2021, the release date of film was indefinitely delayed due to rise in COVID-19 cases and lockdown in Maharashtra. It was later rescheduled to release on 10 September 2021, with the new title Thalaivii. The film will be available for streaming on Netflix and Amazon Prime Video simultaneously, four weeks after its theatrical release.

The makers of Thalaivii announced a two-week window for the Hindi version and a four-week window for Tamil and Telugu versions of the film before its release in the OTT services. Multiplex chains PVR Cinemas and INOX have expressed their disapproval over this policy and appealed for a uniform four-week window across all the language versions. Ranaut responded they could a find a solution with the talks so that "the Hindi version can also find love and appreciation on the big screen."

Thalaivii after limited and single screen theatrical release in India, It was released on Netflix (Hindi) 2 weeks later and on Amazon Prime Video (Tamil, Telugu, Kannada, Malayalam) 4 weeks later with respect to the deals made by producers with OTT platforms. The Hindi version of the film had its world television premiere on Zee Cinema on Christmas Day, 25 December 2021. The film was anonymously dubbed in Bengali as Thalaivii Netri and was released on YouTube.

== Reception ==
=== Box office ===
Made with a budget of ₹100 crore , the film earned ₹4.75 crore in its first week at the box office. The Indian Express reported that the movie had a dismal opening. The Hindi version earned ₹20 lakhs on Day 1, while it earned ₹80 lakhs in Tamil Nadu. Total Day 1 collection was reported to be ₹1.25 crore.

The film was a box office failure.

=== Critical reception ===
Upon release, Thalaivii was met with mixed reviews from film critics; Ranaut and Swamy's performance was praised but the screenplay of the film drew criticism. On the review aggregator website Rotten Tomatoes, 20% of 10 critics' reviews are positive, with an average rating of 4.7/10.

==== India ====
Bollywood Hungama critics rounded the review with a score of 3.5 on 5, calling the film overall a well-made and well-written political saga that is embellished with yet another award-winning performance by Kangana Ranaut. Also, Critic based at The Times of India, Renuka Vyawahare said: "Kangana & Arvind Swamy pay a resounding ode to Jaya-MGR’s poignant love story". She awarded the film 3.5/5 score. However, she added: "The political aspect feels talky, half baked and one-sided." In her review for The Indian Express, Shubhra Gupta wrote, "For a film that revolves around Kangana Ranaut as J Jayalalithaa, it does give others their due: Arvind Swamy as MGR, Bhagyashree as Jaya’s mother and Nassar as Karunanidhi." She awarded the film 3 stars on 5.

Unmesh Panwani of Koimoi rated the film 2.5 on 5, adding. "All said and done, Thalaivii has a lot of good things going in its favour but it remains half-baked only for the reason of ‘what it could’ve been?" Saibal Chatterjee in his review for NDTV called the film botched by massive missteps, the film as Amma (Mother) of all misfires. However, he praised a few of the performances, especially Arvind Swami, who "absolutely nails the MGR impersonation." He gave the film 2 out of 5 score. Lakshmi Subramaniam of The Week pointed: "Thalaivii may come across as a melodramatic excuse for a biopic." She awarded a score of 2 on 5.

Film critic Deepa Gahlot wrote: "Kangana Ranaut gets the look right, but is unable to completely inhabit the dynamism of the character, which Arvind Swami does with enviable ease in an award-worthy performance." Baradwaj Rangan of Film Companion described Thalaivii as a "larger-than-life movie told in an almost mythical masala mode" and wrote, "Scene after scene, the achievement of the film is how there’s always something new that keeps your eyes riveted, even though you already know these stories". Nandini Ramnath of Scroll opined: "A flattering and flattening portrait of J Jayalalithaa. Thalaivii survives the pedestrian writing and unimaginative direction". Monika Kukreja of Hindustan Times stated: "The Kangana Ranaut-starrer is packed with solid performances and an attention to period detail, but is let down by its length and an incomplete-feeling story." Srivatsan of The Hindu opined: "it is only fair to say that Thalaivii is a half-biopic. The problem with Thalaivii is not exactly the 'masala-fication' of a dramatic life in public. It is bending facts with fiction, through hearsay stories".

==== Overseas ====
Ambica Sachin of Khaleej Times gave the film a rating of 3/5 praising Ranaut's performance she wrote, "Kangana doesn’t try to mimic the iconic leader but rather delves into the spirit of a woman whose journey from Ammu to Amma, a figure revered and reviled in equal measures by those who knew her, is the stuff of folklore". Manjusha Radhakrishnan writes for Gulf News, in her review, she noted: "Everything’s on the nose in this film as they depict every situation and twist with no nuance", whereas praised, "Kangana Ranaut and Arvind Swamy shine in this overdramatic political drama". She assigned a score of 2.5 on 5. Mike McCahill of The Guardian summarized: "While more nuanced than many of its star's recent statements - it could hardly be otherwise - the film still feels like a passive-aggressive idea of doubling down." He compared the plot and character as if Margaret Thatcher went to Rank Charm School, awarding it 2 stars out of 5.

==== Year-end lists ====
Several publications listed Thalaivii as one of the best films of 2021. Shubhra Gupta of The Indian Express listed it as one of the best movies of 2021. Aparita Bhandari of Paste listed it as one of the top ten best Bollywood movies of 2021. Times of India listed it as one of the top thirty best Hindi movies of 2021. Jasmine Ting and Corinne Sullivan of Cosmopolitan listed it as one of the twenty-six best Bollywood movies of 2021. Kumari Purvi of SheThePeople listed it as one of the top five best films of 2021. Subhash K. Jha of Rediff listed it as one of the seven must-watch films of 2021. Kunal Purandare of Forbes India picked Thalaivii as one of his favourite movies of 2021. CNN-IBN listed it as one of the top female-lead films of 2021. Avantika Chopra of IndiaTimes listed it as one of the best women-centric films of 2021. Thalaivii was featured among the top twenty best Tamil language films at the 13th Norway Tamil Film Festival. For her performance in Thalaivii, Twinkle Khanna of Pinkvilla listed Ranaut as the best female performer of the year 2021.

== Awards and nominations ==
Award	Date of the ceremony	Category	Recipients	Result	Ref.
Norway Tamil Film Festival Awards	14 January 2022	Special Jury Award	Arvind Swamy	Won	
Norway Tamil Film Festival Awards	14 January 2022	Best Choreography	Gayathri Raguram (For "Kannum Kannum Pesa Pesa")	Won	
Filmfare Awards	30 August 2022	Best Supporting Actor	Raj Arjun	Nominated	
Filmfare Awards	30 August 2022	Best Costume Design	Neeta Lulla & Deepali Noor	Nominated	
Filmfare Awards	30 August 2022	Best VFX	Unifi Media	Nominated	
Filmfare Awards	30 August 2022	Best Actress	Kangana Ranaut (revoked)	Nominated	
Mirchi Music Awards	19 March 2022	Upcoming Female Vocalist of The Year	Saindhavi	Nominated	
International Indian Film Academy Awards	3–4 June 2022	Best Story (Adapted)	V. Vijayendra Prasad	Nominated	
JFW Movie Awards	19 March 2022	Best Actress – Women Centric	Kangana Ranaut	Nominated	
FOI Online Awards	23 January 2022	Best Costume Design	Deepali Noor & Neeta Lulla	Nominated	
FOI Online Awards	23 January 2022	Best Choreography	Gayathri Raguram (For "Nain Bandhe Naino Se")	Nominated	
South Indian International Movie Awards	10-11 September 2022	Best Actress – Tamil	Kangana Ranaut	Won	
South Indian International Movie Awards	10-11 September 2022	Best Actor in a Supporting Role – Tamil	Arvind Swamy	Won	
South Indian International Movie Awards	10-11 September 2022	Special Jury Award for Best Production Design	S. Rama Krishna and Monika Niggotre S.	Won	
South Indian International Movie Awards	10-11 September 2022	Best Music Director - Tamil	G. V. Prakash Kumar	Nominated	
Osaka Tamil Film Festival Awards	19 May 2023	Best Actress - Tamil	Kangana Ranaut	Won	

Ranaut was initially nominated for the Filmfare Award for Best Actress, but her nomination was revoked after she accused Filmfare of having an unethical awarding system.

== Legal issues ==
The producers initially received permission from Jayalalithaa's nephew Deepak Jayakumar in his request to make it as "an honest portrayal of her life". However, Jayalalithaa's niece, Deepa Jayakumar, in November 2019, registered a complaint against the film's makers through the Madras High Court. She asserted that she was the legal heir of Jayalalitha and that before making a movie or a web series about her life, the creators of the film should have approached her. She also said that the film makers have no legal right to make a film about the life of Jayalalithaa, which could affect the privacy of her aunt and her family. Deepa also demanded that the whole script be sent to her well before movie comes to the theatres. The Madras High Court gave Deepa approval to take legal action against director AL Vijay, film producer Vishnu and Gautham Vasudev Menon who made a web series loosely based on the life Jayalalithaa's life titled Queen which starred Ramya Krishnan essaying the title role.
