= Vidyavathi (actress) =

Indian actress (1924–1971)

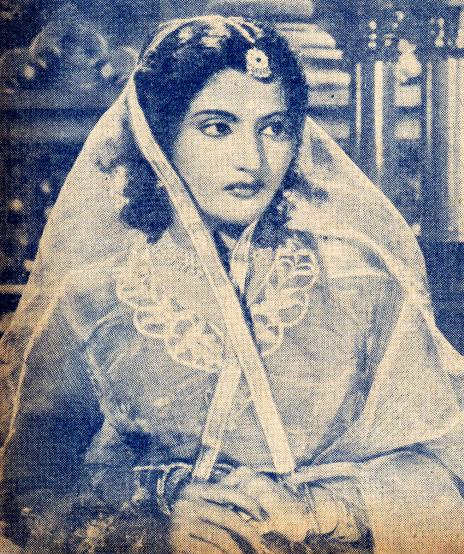
- Born: N. R. Ambujavalli; 1931; Ranganaykulapet, Nellore district, Madras Presidency, British Raj (present-day Andhra Pradesh, India)
- Died: 4 April 1984 (aged 52–53); Bengaluru, Karnataka, India
- Other names: Vidya, Ambuja
- Occupation: Actress
- Years active: 1951–1966
- Spouse: T. R. Venkataraman
- Children: Ameetha Chari; Jayanthi Mehta
- Parent(s): N. Rangaswamy Iyengar (father); Kamalambal (mother)
- Relatives: Sandhya (Sister); Jayalalithaa (niece); Deepa Jayakumar (Grand niece)

Ambujavalli (1931 – 1984), better known as Vidyavathi, was a South Indian film actress, who appeared in Tamil, Kannada and Telugu films. She adopted the screen name Vidyavathi for her acting career and was known for portraying character roles, often as villainess. She is the younger sister of Actress Sandhya and the youngest aunt of former Chief Minister of Tamil Nadu J. Jayalalithaa. She also acted in films and was paired with M. G. Chakrapani in Alibabavum 40 Thirudargalum. She also appeared in En Veedu and Chandirani.

== Early life and family ==
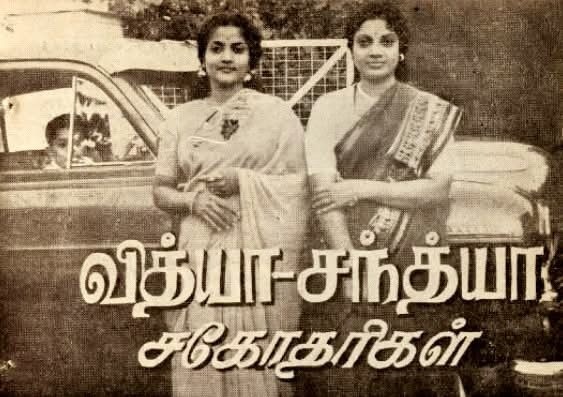
Vidyavathi (left) with her elder sister Sandhya (right) in front of a 1952 model Vauxhall Velox, as featured in a magazine, 1954.

She was born as Ambujavalli into a Tamil Iyengar Brahmin family from Srirangam, Madras Presidency, British India in 1931. Her father, Rangaswamy Iyengar, moved to Mysore from Srirangam to work with Hindustan Aeronautics Limited. She had one brother and two sisters—Vedavalli and Padmavalli. Vidya and her siblings along with their grandparents initially lived in East Chittirai Street in Srirangam. Later, her father Rangaswamy, who was a practicing lawyer based in Karur from the 1910s to the 1930s, purchased a house from a Diwan in the same street and named it "Komala Vilas Vedha Nilayam".

== Later career ==
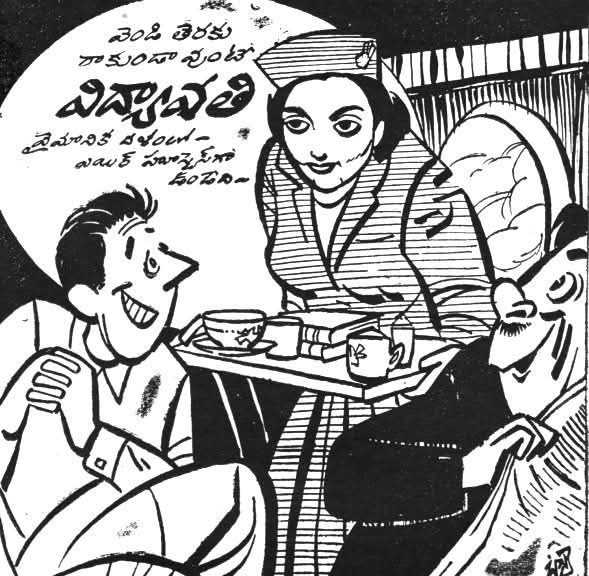
Caricature by renowned Telugu cartoonist Bapu depicting Vidyavathi as an air hostess from 1950s

After completing her schooling at the Bengaluru Mahila Samaja School, she passed the Intermediate examination in correspondence in Mumbai. She subsequently worked as an assistant in the Office of the Textile Commissioner in Mumbai. Later, Ambujavalli moved to Madras, where she worked as an air hostess with Tata Airlines (now Air India) from 1948. She was noted for her Western appearance, poised physique, and fluency in English, which reportedly attracted the attention of many passengers. During one of her flights, actresses Lalitha and Padmini are said to have encouraged her to consider a career in films. Later started acting dramas of the United Amateur Artists since 1951, one of the earliest amateur drama troupes in Chennai, founded by Y. G. Parthasarathy. Without resigning from her position as an air hostess, she also entered into a small acting contract with Gemini Studios. She made her screen debut in the film Naa Illu, introduced by actor V. Nagayya in the screen name "Vidyavathi". She acted in films like Alibabavum 40 Thirudargalum, En Veedu and Chandirani using the screen name "Vidyavathy". On Ambujavalli's insistence, Vedhavalli also relocated to Madras and resided with her sister from 1952. Vedhavalli worked in a commercial firm in Madras and began dabbling in acting in 1953 under the screen name Sandhya. Around the same period, her elder sister Sandhya was cast in a negative role in 'Karkottai', where her debut performance got good reception. Vidyavathi resided at No. 12, on C. P. Ramaswami Iyer Road, a street lined with bungalows in the Alwarpet neighbourhood of Chennai. She later moved to Gandhi Nagar in Adyar. Vidyavathi reportedly led a lavish lifestyle, including smoking, drinking, and driving her own Fiat car. She also cencouraged her niece Jayalalithaa to later enter the film industry. Vidyavathi is married an engineer T. R. Venkataraman from Madras. In 1967, She also started and ran a school named 'A. V. Education Society' for children with disabilities in Bengaluru. Her daughters, Ameetha and Jayanthi, later settled abroad in Sydney, Australia and United States respectively. Both the daughters are in the field of education and active Trustees of now renamed Samved school.

Following the death of her sister Sandhya, who had managed Jayalalithaa's career and finances, she reportedly suffered a nervous breakdown. According to several accounts, MGR supported the recovery of Jayalalithaa, who later assumed her own control over financial and professional affairs and distanced herself from her relatives, following disputes with maternal aunt Vidyavathi. The two remained estranged thereafter. Vidyavathi's family subsequently settled in Bengaluru.

== Death and Legacy ==
Vidyavathi died in Bengaluru on 4 April 1984 at the age of 53.

== Filmography ==
Year	Title	Role	Language	Notes	Ref.
1953	Chandirani	Queen Kantha	Telugu/Tamil	Debut on-screen appearance in bilingual movie	
1953	Naa Illu	Leela	Telugu		
1953	En veedu	Leela	Tamil	Tamil dubbed version of 'Naa Illu'	
1954	Natashekhara	Actress Nalini	Kannada	lead role, paired with Kalyan Kumar on his debut movie	
1954	Ratha Paasam	Manorama	Tamil	paired with T. K. Bhagavathi and acted along with sister Sandhya	
1955	Manoradham		Tamil	Dubbed version of Natashekhara	
1955	Sodari		Kannada		
1955	Bangaru Papa	Parvati	Telugu		
1956	Alibabavum 40 Thirudargalum	Salima	Tamil	Villainess role and paired with M. G. Chakrapani	
1957	Samaya Sanjeevi		Tamil	paired with T. R. Ramachandran and acted along with sister Sandhya	
1957	Yaar Paiyyan	Rooba	Tamil	paired with T. R. Ramachandran and acted along with sister Sandhya	
1958	Anna Thangi	Girija	Kannada		
1962	Kavitha	Lucy	Tamil	"Manakkum Roja My Lady" song sequence with T. S. Balaiah	
1965	Mavana Magalu		Kannada		
1966	Thedi vandha Thirumagal	Kamala	Tamil		
