= Ratha Paasam (1954 film) =

1954 film by R. S. Mani

- Theatrical release poster
- Directed by: R. S. Mani
- Written by: C. V. Sridhar
- Based on: Ratha Paasam by C. V. Sridhar
- Produced by: T. K. Muthusamy
- Starring: T. K. Shanmugam; T. K. Bhagavathi; Anjali Devi; T. S. Balaiah
- Cinematography: Nemai Gosh
- Edited by: K. Govindasamy
- Music by: M. K. Athmanathan; A. V. Natarajan
- Production company: Auvai Productions
- Release date: 14 August 1954
- Running time: 179 minutes
- Country: India
- Language: Tamil

Ratha Paasam (transl. Blood affection) is a 1954 Indian Tamil-language drama film directed by R. S. Mani, written by C. V. Sridhar and produced by T. K. Muthusamy. The film stars T. K. Shanmugam, T. K. Bhagavathi, Anjali Devi, M. S. Draupadi, T. S. Balaiah and N. R. Vidyavathi. It is based on Sridhar's play of the same name. The film was released on 14 August 1954, became a commercial success, and was later remade in Hindi as Bhai-Bhai (1956).

== Plot ==
Raja is a petty thief pickpocket living around the streets of Bombay. In the same city lives Rani, who makes a living through dancing. The two meet and fall in love. Raghu, the owner of a bicycle company, leads a life of luxury with his wife Sarala and children in Madras. Madhu, his manager, has been misappropriating the company's funds with the help of his lover Manorama who Raghu is later attracted to. The company is soon closed due to losses, putting Sarala and her children in poverty.

Raghu leaves for Bombay to seek new ventures, leaving his family behind. Sarala goes in search of him. One day, Raja steals Raghu's purse and discovers in it photographs which reveal that Raghu is his long-lost brother. He goes in search of Raghu, who does not recognise him. Sarala faces many troubles and after several incidents, all problems are solved and the family reunites.

== Cast ==
- T. K. Shanmugam as Raja
- T. K. Bhagavathi as Raghu
- Anjali Devi as Rani
- M. S. Draupadi as Sarala
- T. S. Balaiah as Madhu
- N. R. Vidyavathi as Manorama
- T. K. S. Natarajan
- N. R. Sandhya

== Production ==
When he was 17−18 years old, C. V. Sridhar wrote a story named Latchiyavathi and approached AVM Productions with the intention of making it a film, but AVM director P. Neelakantan rejected it. The story was later picked up for the stage by T. K. Shanmugam's troupe, T.K.S. Brothers and staged as Ratha Paasam. The play's film adaptation would later be produced by Shanmugam's brother T. K. Muthusamy under the banner "Auvai Productions", and directed by R. S. Mani. The screenplay was written by Sridhar. Cinematography was handled by Nemai Ghosh, and the editing by K. Govindasamy. Shanmugam and his other brother Bhagavathi, who acted in the play, reprised their roles in the film adaptation. Shooting took place at Neptune Studios, later known as Dr. MGR-Janaki College of Arts and Science for Women.

== Soundtrack ==
Music was composed by M. K. Athmanathan and A. V. Natarajan. The T.K.S. Brothers intentionally did chose Athmanathan while rejecting suggestions for established composers. The song "Dullu... Dullu... Very Dullu..." is a satire on the economic situation and hypocrisy of Madras in the 1950s and of how people then lived their lives.

Song	Singer/s	Lyricist	Duration
"Maamogam Aanaen"	Jikki		03:23
"Dallu Dallu Dallu"	Thiruchi Loganathan		03:03
"Enge Selvayo"	A. M. Rajah & Kantha		
"Aiyappaa Idhu Meiyappaa"	S. C. Krishnan		03:09
"Aanandha Vaibogam"	Jikki & K. Rani	M. K. Athmanathan	03:18
"Jegam Yaavume"	(Radha) Jayalakshmi		
"Panam Irukkira Manushangitta"	P. Leela	Ku. Ma. Balasubramaniam	02:31
"Nilaiyaana Inbam Manavaalan Anbe"	M. L. Vasanthakumari		03:23
"O En Raajaa"	P. Leela	M. K. Athmanathan	05:31
"Paadhakam Seivadhum...Udan Pirandhavan"	A. M. Rajah	M. K. Athmanathan	03:05

== Release and reception ==
Ratha Paasam was released on 14 August 1954, and became a commercial success. AVM later produced the Hindi remake Bhai-Bhai in 1956.
