= Magathala Nattu Mary =

- Directed by: S. S. Rajan
- Screenplay by: Sam D. Dasan
- Produced by: M. L. Pathy
- Starring: Sriram; Kumari Thangam; Raguveer; G. Sakunthala
- Cinematography: Sanganlal
- Music by: R. Parthasarathy
- Production company: Jaykumar Pictures
- Release date: 20 December 1957
- Running time: 170 minutes
- Country: India
- Language: Tamil

Magathala Nattu Mary (transl. Mary of Magathala country) is a 1957 Indian Tamil-language film directed by S. S. Rajan. The film stars Sriram and Kumari Thangam. It was released on 20 December 1957.

== Cast ==
List adapted from the database of Film News Anandan and from Thiraikalanjiyam.

Male cast

- Sriram
- P. S. Veerappa
- Raghuveer
- E. R. Sahadevan
- Mohan
- P. Varatharajan
- T. C. Sundaramoorthy

Female cast

- Kumari Thangam
- G. Sakunthala
- Susheela
- Revathy

== Production ==
The film was produced by M. L. Pathy under the banner Jaikumar Pictures and was directed by S. S. Rajan. Sam D. Dasan wrote the screenplay and dialogues. Cinematography was handled by Sanganlal and Raj was in charge of art direction. The film was made at the Paramount Studios in Chennai.

== Soundtrack ==
Music was composed by R. Parthasarathy. The song "Kannukku Naerae Minnidum Thaarai" is the first Tamil song sung by S. Janaki.

Song	Singer/s	Lyricist
"Yaeno Thaan Karvam Nenje"	Jikki	Kambadasan
"Parandhu Sellum Venpuraavum"	P. Susheela	Kambadasan
"Kannaadi Naan Oru Kannaadi"	P. Susheela	Naavarasu
"Nenjam Kumuri Andho"	Ghantasala	Naavarasu
"Kannum Kannum Onnukkonnu"	S. V. Ponnusamy & K. Rani	M. P. Sivam
"Kannukku Naerae Minnidum Thaarai"	P. B. Srinivas & S. Janaki	M. P. Sivam
"Jaya Jaya Jayame Peruvadhu Nijame"	K. Rani & Soolamangalam Rajalakshmi	M. P. Sivam
"Kadhai Kelunga Nallaa Kadhai Kelunga"	S. V. Ponnusamy	M. P. Sivam
"Thunbam Theerave Inbam Kaanave"	K. Jamuna Rani	M. P. Sivam
