= Naalu Veli Nilam =

- Theatrical release poster
- Directed by: Muktha V. Srinivasan
- Screenplay by: Thi. Janakiraman
- Based on: Naalu Veli Nilam by Seva Stage
- Produced by: S. V. Sahasranamam
- Starring: S. V. Sahasranamam; Pandari Bai; Mynavathi; V. R. Rajagopal
- Cinematography: Nimal Gosh
- Edited by: D. Vijayarangam; K. Durai
- Music by: K. V. Mahadevan; M. K. Athmanathan
- Production company: Seva Screens
- Distributed by: Ananda Pictures
- Release date: 2 September 1959
- Running time: 173 minutes
- Country: India
- Language: Tamil

Naalu Veli Nilam (transl. Four-fenced land) is a 1959 Indian Tamil-language drama film directed by Muktha V. Srinivasan. The film stars S. V. Sahasranamam, S. N. Lakshmi,M. Pandaribai and M. Mynavathi. It is based on the play of the same name. The film was released on 2 September 1959.

== Cast ==
List adapted from the database of Film News Anandan.

Male cast

- S. V. Sahasranamam
- S. V. Subbaiah
- Kuladeivam Rajagopal
- R. Muthuraman
- A. Veerappan

Female cast

- M. Pandari Bai
- M. Mynavathi
- Devika
- S. N. Lakshmi

== Production ==
Naalu Veli Nilam was adapted from the Seva Stage play of the same name. The film was produced by S. V. Sahasranamam (who had also acted in the play) and was directed by Muktha V. Srinivasan. The story, screenplay and dialogues were written by writer and novelist T. Janakiraman. Nimai Gosh was in charge of cinematography while editing was done by D. Vijayarangam and K. Durai. Kalasaagaram Rajagopal was in charge of art direction. Choreography was done by Madhavan, Chinnilal and Sampathkumar, and still photography by B. Ranganathan. The film was shot at Bharani Studios and processed at Vijaya laboratory.

== Soundtrack ==
Music was composed by K. V. Mahadevan and M. K. Athmanathan. A folk song, a Thiruvarutpa by Ramalinga Swamigal in the raga Arabhi and three songs by Bharathiyar were also included in the film.

Song	Singer/s	Composer	Lyricist	Duration (m:ss)
"Ooraar Urangaiyile"	Thiruchi Loganathan & L. R. Eswari	K. V. Mahadevan	Folk Song	03:21
"Kulipen Panneerile"	S. C. Krishnan & K. Jamuna Rani	K. V. Mahadevan	A. Maruthakasi	05:01
"Paadupattu Thaedi Panathai .. Iruppavargal Anubavikka"	P. Susheela	K. V. Mahadevan	A. Maruthakasi	04:05
"Muruga Muruga Muruga"; Title song	Sirkazhi Govindarajan	K. V. Mahadevan	Bharathiyar	02:56
"Nambinaar Keduvadhillai"	A. L. Raghavan & A. Andal	M. K. Athmanathan	Bharathiyar	03:36
"Kaani Nilam Vendum"	Soolamangalam Rajalakshmi	M. K. Athmanathan	Bharathiyar	00:49
"Enakkum Unakkum"	Soolamangalam Rajalakshmi	M. K. Athmanathan	Ramalinga Swamigal	03:46
"Singaara Cholaiyile"	S. C. Krishnan	M. K. Athmanathan	M. K. Athmanathan	
"Unnai Thaedi Vandhen"	S. C. Krishnan & K. Jamuna Rani	M. K. Athmanathan	M. K. Athmanathan	01:49
"Inba Kavidhai Paaduthu"	R. Jayaraman & S. Janaki	M. K. Athmanathan	M. K. Athmanathan	02:46
"Kalyaanamaam Kalyaanam"	R. Jayaraman, S. Janaki & group	M. K. Athmanathan	M. K. Athmanathan	03:55

== Reception ==
The film was a loss to Sahasranamam. He mortgaged his house, paid compensation to the distributors and paid the balance fee to Pandari Bai and Mynavathi. Kanthan of Kalki appreciated Janakiraman's writing, Srinivasan's direction and Gosh's cinematography.
