= Nalla Veedu =

- Poster
- Directed by: Jyotish Sinha
- Written by: M. L. Pathi
- Screenplay by: M. L. Pathi
- Starring: Sivaji Ganesan; M. N. Rajam; Pandaribai; Mynavathi
- Music by: Krishnamurthi; Nagaraja Iyer
- Distributed by: Jai Sakthi Pictures
- Release date: 14 January 1956
- Country: India
- Language: Tamil

Nalla Veedu (transl. Good House) is a 1956 Indian Tamil language film, directed by Jyotish Sinha. The film stars Sivaji Ganesan, M. N. Rajam, Pandaribai and Mynavathi. It was released on 14 January 1956.

== Cast ==
- Sivaji Ganesan
- M. N. Rajam
- Pandaribai
- Mynavathi
- R. S. Manohar
- T. S. Balaiah
- K. A. Thangavelu

== Soundtrack ==
The music was composed by Krishnamurthi & Nagaraja Iyer.

Song	Singers	Lyrics
"Rubber Balloon Paaru"	A. M. Rajah	M. P. Sivam
"Vedikkai Parkkindra Thaai"	Sarojini	M. P. Sivam
"Vidhiyin Sodhanai Idhuthaanaa"	R. Balasaraswathi Devi	M. P. Sivam
"Kalaimathiye En Kaadhal"	P. B. Srinivas & R. Balasaraswathi Devi	M. P. Sivam
"Govindan Kuzhal Osai Kettu"	T. V. Rathnam	Thilagam
"Vidhiyai Vendravar Yaar Ulagil"	T. M. Soundararajan	Thilagam
"Nalla Nalla Veedu Katti"	Chorus	Lakshmanadas
"Idhayame Sorgamaagum"	R. Balasaraswathi Devi	Lakshmanadas
"Kaalaiyil Ezhundhu Anbaai"	A. Andal	Lakshmanadas
