= Kumari (1952 film) =

1952 film by R. Padmanaban

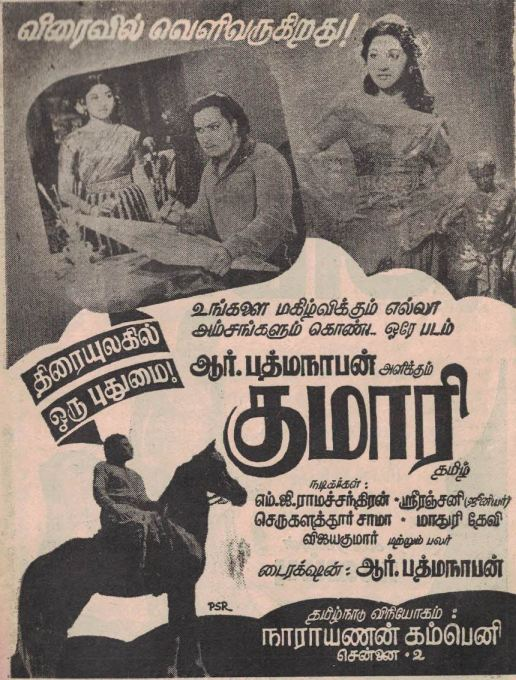
- Directed by: R. Padmanaban
- Story by: Ku. Sa. Krishnamurthi
- Produced by: R. Padmanaban
- Starring: M. G. Ramachandran; Madhuri Devi; Sri Ranjani (Junior)
- Cinematography: D. Marconi
- Edited by: V. P. Nataraja Mudaliyar
- Music by: K. V. Mahadevan
- Release date: 11 April 1952
- Country: India
- Language: Tamil

Kumari is a 1952 Indian Tamil-language film directed by R. Padmanaban, starring M. G. Ramachandran, Madhuri Devi and Sri Ranjani (Junior). It was released on 11 April 1952.

== Plot ==
The princess Kumari, while travelling in a horse carriage, meets gets involved in an accident when the horses run wild, and is rescued by a man named Vijayan. The two fall in love and the princess gives him a signet and invites him to her palace. Problems arise when the king wishes to get the princess married and the queen Chandravali wishes to have her married to her useless brother Sahaaran. After many thrilling incidents, the lovers are united and live happily ever after.

== Cast ==
Male cast

- M. G. Ramachandran as Vijayan
- Serukalathur Sama as Mandhara
- Vijayakumar as Prathap
- Stunt Somu as Vallaban
- T. S. Durairaj as Saharan
- Pulimoottai Ramasami as Pulimoottai
- Sayeeram as Viharan
- Kottapuli Jayaram as Minister
- Rajamani as Minister
- Ramaraj as Minister
- K. K. Mani as Mani Singh

Female cast

- Madhuri Devi as Chandravali
- Sri Ranjani (Junior) as Kumari
- Kantha Sohanlal as Jeela
- K. S. Angamuthu as Mother
- C. T. Rajakantham as Chandrika
- Padmavathi Ammal as Mangala

Supported by

Hundreds of circus gypsies played
male and female actors.

== Production ==
The film was produced and directed by R. Padmanaban. Ku. Sa. Krishnamurthi and S. M. Santhanam wrote the story and dialogues. Cinematography was done by D. Marconi while V. P. Nataraja Mudaliyar handled the editing. Choreography was done by Sohanlal and Still photography was done by R. N. Nagaraja Rao. The film was also made in Telugu with the title Rajeshwari.

== Soundtrack ==
The music was composed by K. V. Mahadevan. There were also gypsy dances choreographed by Sohanlal. One song rendered by Jikki off-screen, 'Laalalee laallee…..' picturised on Madhuri Devi, became popular.

Song	Singers	Lyrics	Length
"Azhiyaadha Kaadhal Vaazhvil Anaiyaadha Jothiyaai"	A. M. Rajah	Ku. Sa. Krishnamurthi	03:00
"Aayo Shigi Maayo"	A. P. Komala	T. K. Sundara Vathiyar	03:00
"Vaazhga Vaazhga Sathiyame"	Group song	T. K. Sundara Vathiyar	
"Aanukkoru Penn Venumey"	K. V. Mahadevan	T. K. Sundara Vathiyar	02:32
"Kadhalin Cholai Kaniyai"	A. M. Rajah		
"Azhagin Rani Yaarenake Inaiyaavaar"	Jikki		03:28
"Irulile Nilavoli Pol Avar Varuvar"	A. M. Rajah & Jikki	M. P. Sivam	03:21
"O Ambuliye Vaa"	P. Leela	M. P. Sivam	02:41
"Adhairiyam Kolvadhu Ariveenam...Prakaasam Poley"	A. M. Rajah & P. Leela	M. P. Sivam	03:40
"Lalalee Lalalee.... Aaha Azhagin Arpudhame"	Jikki	M. P. Sivam	03:27
"Cholla Cholla Ulley Vetkam"	A. P. Komala	M. P. Sivam	02:49
"Alaiyaadum Poley"	P. Leela	M. P. Sivam	03:56
"Themmaangu Dabukku Dabbaa"	Group song	M. P. Sivam	
"Naattukku Nalam Naaduvom"	N. L. Ganasaraswathi	M. P. Sivam	

== Release ==
Kumari was released on 11 April 1952, and did not do well commercially.
