= Samaya Sanjeevi =

- Directed by: V. S. Raghavan
- Written by: Pattu
- Based on: Dial Mr. Sanjeevi by Pattu
- Produced by: Pattu Rajagopal
- Starring: Pattu; Vidyavathi; T. R. Ramachandran; M. N. Nambiar
- Music by: G. Ramanathan
- Production company: Sri Nataraja Films
- Release date: 9 March 1957
- Running time: 190 minutes
- Country: India
- Language: Tamil

Samaya Sanjeevi (transl. Timely Remedy) is a 1957 Indian Tamil-language film directed by V. S. Raghavan and written by Pattu. The film stars Pattu, Vidyavathi, T. R. Ramachandran and Sandhya. Based on Pattu's play Dial Mr. Sanjeevi, it was released on 9 March 1957.

== Cast ==
List compiled from the database of Film News Anandan and from Thiraikalanjiyam Part 1

- Pattu
- Vidyavathi
- T. R. Ramachandran
- M. N. Nambiar
- Sandhya
- M. N. Rajam
- K. Sarangapani
- C. K. Saraswathi
- Sivathanu
- M. K. Moorthi
- Kusalakumari

== Production ==
The film was produced by Pattu Rajagopal who also wrote the story and dialogues and also featured in one of the main characters in the film. Choreography was done by Madhavan and Krishna Rao. The film was made at Revathi Studios.

== Soundtrack ==
Music was composed by G. Ramanathan, while the lyrics were penned by A. Maruthakasi.

Song	Singer/s	Length
"Aanandam Tharuvadhu Sangeethame"	N. L. Ganasaraswathi & (Radha) Jayalakshmi	03:20
"Thendral Vandhu Vilaiyaadum"	Jikki	03:11
"Jarikaipattu Salasalakka"	Jikki	03:05
"Paper Paper Paper"	J. P. Chandrababu	03:08
"Gama Gamavena Narumanam Veesudhe"	P. B. Sreenivas & Jikki	03:02
"Sindhikkum Thanmai Attradhaalaa"	P. Susheela	03:22
"Thiruvarul Thandhu Aadhari"	T. V. Rathnam	02:35
"Veliye Sonnaa Vetkam"	S. C. Krishnan	02:56
