= Ponvayal =

1954 film by A. T. Krishnaswamy

- Theatrical release poster
- Directed by: A. T. Krishnaswamy
- Screenplay by: A. T. Krishnaswamy
- Based on: Poimaan Karadu by Kalki Krishnamurthy
- Produced by: T. R. Ramachandran
- Starring: T. R. Ramachandran; Anjali Devi
- Cinematography: Nemai Ghosh
- Edited by: M. K. Mani
- Music by: Thurayur Rajgopal Sarma; R. Rajagopal
- Production company: Jayanthi Pictures
- Distributed by: Madras Pictures
- Release date: 12 February 1954
- Country: India
- Language: Tamil

Ponvayal (transl. Golden Farm) is a 1954 Indian Tamil-language film written and directed by A. T. Krishnaswamy, and produced by T. R. Ramachandran. It is based on the story Poimaan Karadu by Kalki Krishnamurthy that was serialised in the weekly magazine Kalki. The film stars T. R. Ramachandran and Anjali Devi. It was released on 12 February 1954 and failed commercially. The film is lost.

== Plot ==
Sengodan owns 10 acres of land, known as "Ponvayal" (Golden Farm). It is rumoured that a fortune in gold is buried in Ponvayal. Sengodan loves his cousin Semba. Esraj, a counterfeiter, plans to obtain the fortune. He seeks the help of a graduate named Bangaru and his lover. Unknown to Esraj, a policeman and an actress work against him and the crafty couple succeeds in foiling the plans of Esraj. Sengodan is later arrested on charges of attempting to murder Bangaru, but the policeman, with help from his girlfriend, discovers the truth and Sengodan is exonerated.

== Cast ==
- T. R. Ramachandran as Sengodan
- Anjali Devi as Semba
- Manohar as Bangaru
- Mynavathi as Bangaru's lover
- K. Sarangapani as the policeman
- K. A. Thangavelu as Esraj

== Production ==
Poimaan Karadu was a novel written by Kalki Krishnamurthy and serialised in his own magazine Kalki. When the film rights to this story were bought, the film adaptation was titled Ponvayal. It was directed and written by A. T. Krishnaswamy, and produced by T. R. Ramachandran (who also played the male lead) under Jayanthi Pictures. It is the company's first production.

== Soundtrack ==
The music of the film was composed by Thuraiyur Rajagopal Sarma and R. Rajagopal, under the supervision of N. P. Abdul Khader. The lyrics were written by Yogi Suddhanantha Bharathiyar and Sundara Vathiyar. It is the first film in which Seerkali Govindarajan sang. He sang the song " Siripputhaan varuguthaiya" .

Song	Singer/s	Lyricist	Duration
"Maathamum Maari"	Group song		
"Pongalo Pongal Pongalo"	N. L. Ganasaraswathi	Suddhanantha Bharathiyar	03:20
"Polladha Paavigal Ellaam"	N. L. Ganasaraswathi		
"Maadugalaa Kaalai Maadugalaa"	Thiruchy Loganathan- N L Ganasaraswathi	T Rajagopal	
"Siripputhaan Varuguthaiyaa"	Thiruchy Loganathan- N L Ganasaraswathi		05:53
"Onghi Valarndha Payir"			
"Namma Kalyaanam Romba Nalla"	T. R. Ramachandran & N. L. Ganasaraswathi		02:47
"Enna Vinodham Paaru"	K. Sarangkapani		
"Vaazhvinile Naame Jaaliyaaka Povom"			
"Koodayirundhu Kudiyai Keduththida"			
"Azhaiyaadha Veettil Nuzhayaadha Seemaan"	Jikki		02:57
"Vaanga Vaanga Maappillai"	A. Andal		
"Azhaiyaadha Veettil"	A. Andal		

== Release and reception ==
Ponvayal was released on 12 February 1954, and distributed by Madras Pictures. The critic from The Indian Express positively reviewed the film for Krishnaswamy's writing and direction, along with the performances of Ramachandran, Anjali Devi and Muthulakshmi. Despite this, it failed at the box office. No print of the film is known to survive, making it a lost film.
