= Vandhaale Magaraasi =

- Title card
- Directed by: K. S. Gopalakrishnan
- Screenplay by: K. S. Gopalakrishnan
- Story by: C. G. Ranganathan
- Starring: Jaishankar; Jayalalithaa
- Cinematography: M. R. Ravindran
- Edited by: R. Devarajan
- Music by: Shankar–Ganesh
- Production company: Ashok Pictures
- Release date: 16 March 1973
- Running time: 171 minutes
- Country: India
- Language: Tamil

Vandhaale Magaraasi (transl. The blessed woman has arrived) is a 1973 Indian Tamil-language comedy film, directed by K. S. Gopalakrishnan and produced by Ashok Pictures. The screenplay was written by Gopalakrishnan, the film was shot at his own studio, Karpagam Studios. Music was by Shankar–Ganesh. The film stars Jayalalithaa (in dual role) and M. N. Rajam, playing lead role, with Jaishankar, V. S. Raghavan, Cho Ramaswamy Pushpalatha and Bhagavathy in supporting roles. It was released on 16 March 1973.

== Plot ==
Sundaram, a doctor by profession and an orphan comes to his village, to serve the villagers. He is stunned to see the inhuman behaviour meted out by his landlady Mangamma and her mother towards the other members of the house. The landlady's husband is Sivalingam, her brother and her mother-in-law. The widow's step-daughter Uma and her children undergo many miseries at their hands. To add to this, Lakshmi a simple village teacher, married the landlady Mangamma's brother. She was physically and mentally abused. Sundaram chances upon a look-like of Lakshmi, Rani and requests her to impersonate Lakshmi and teach Mangamma and her mother a lesson. Does Rani accept this proposal?

== Cast ==
- Jayalalithaa as Lakshmi/Rani
- Jaishankar as Dr. Sundaram
- M. N. Rajam as Mangamma
- Cho Ramaswamy as Lakshmi's Husband & Mangamma's Brother
- V. S. Raghavan as Sivalingam
- Pushpalatha as Uma (Sivalingam Daughter)
- C. K. Saraswathi as Mangamma's Mother
- S. N. Lakshmi as Lakshmi's Mother
- T. K. Bhagavathi as Advocate Vaiyapuri (Rani's Father)
- V. R. Thilagam as Sengamalam
- K. Vijayan as Natesan (Uma Husband)
- V. Gopalakrishnan as Cameo Appearance
- Master Sridhar as Cameo Appearance
- Kallapart Natarajan as Saniyasamm
- S. R. Janaki as Sivalingam's Mother
- K. D. Santhanam as Advocate

== Soundtrack ==
Music was composed by Shankar–Ganesh and lyrics were written by Vaali. Jayalalithaa sang "Kankalil Aayiram", rather than use a playback singer.

Song	Singer	Length
"Thinivae Thunnai"	P. Susheela Sirkazhi Govindarajan	4:34
"Yethanaio Pei Irukku"	L. R. Eswari	4:50
"Rakkamma Rani"	T. M. Soundararajan Sirkazhi Govindarajan	1:12
"Kankalil Aayiram"	T. M. Soundararajan Jayalalithaa	9:26
"Ada Mayandi Muniyandi"	M. Thangappan	1:54

== Release and reception ==
Vandhaale Magaraasi was released on 16 March 1973. Navamani praised the acting, humour and direction. For her performance, Jayalalithaa won the Tamil Nadu Cinema Fan Award for Best Actress.
