= Nallakalam =

- Theatrical release poster
- Directed by: K. Vembu; J. Sinha
- Story by: J. Sinha
- Starring: M. K. Radha; N. S. Krishnan; Pandari Bai; T. A. Mathuram
- Cinematography: K. Prabhakar
- Edited by: C. Rajan
- Music by: K. V. Mahadevan
- Production company: Jaishakthi Films
- Distributed by: Subbu & Co
- Release date: 21 May 1954
- Running time: 176 minutes
- Country: India
- Language: Tamil

Nallakalam (transl. Favourable Time) is a 1954 Indian Tamil-language film directed by K. Vembu and Jyotish Sinha. The film stars M. K. Radha and Pandari Bai. It was released on 21 May 1954.

== Cast ==
The list was compiled from the database of Film News Anandan and from Thiraikalanjiyam

Male cast

- M. K. Radha
- T. S. Balaiah
- N. S. Krishnan
- Kuladeivam Rajagopal
- M. L. Pathy
- T. S. Natarajan

Female Cast

- Pandari Bai
- T. A. Mathuram
- K. Varalakshmi
- K. Lakshmikantham

== Production ==
K. Prabhakar was in charge of Cinematography while the editing was done by C. Rajan. Choreography was by Sohanlal. Nallakalam was filmed at Film Centre, Madras and the stills were taken by Gnanam.

== Soundtrack ==
Music was composed by K. V. Mahadevan.

| Song | Singer/s | Lyricist | Length |
|---|---|---|---|
| "Summa Irukkaadhunga" | N. S. Krishnan | Udumalai Narayana Kavi | 02:33 |
| "Vaazhvu Malarndhu" | R. Balasaraswathi Devi | M. P. Sivam | 03:04 |
| "Maname Un Vaazhvil" | R. Balasaraswathi Devi | M. P. Sivam | 03:03 |
| "Kannaale Kaanbadhum" | N. L. Ganasaraswathi | M. P. Sivam | 02:55 |
| "Kaandham Pol Paayum" | K. Rani | M. P. Sivam | 03:20 |
| "Kolaagalamaaga" | A. Andal and group | M. P. Sivam | |
| "Vaazhvin Kadamaiyai" | A. Andal and group | Puratchidasan | |
| "Bharatha Naattin Kangal" | T. A. Mathuram | | 02:24 |

== Release and reception ==
Nallakalam was released on 21 May 1954, and distributed by Subbu & Co. The Indian Express called it an "above-average picture", although the critic said Radha and Pandari Bai "give efficient delineations of their roles".
