= Shri Shaila Mahathme =

Sri Shaila Mahathme
- VCD cover
- Directed by: Aroor Pattabhi
- Screenplay by: Aroor Pattabhi
- Produced by: Neerlahalli Thalikerappa
- Starring: Rajkumar; Dikki Madhavarao; Balakrishna; Hanumanthachar
- Cinematography: K. Janakiram
- Edited by: M. G. Balu Rao
- Music by: T. A. Kalyanam
- Production company: Sri Shaila Pictures
- Release date: 28 November 1961
- Country: India
- Language: Kannada

Sri Shaila Mahathme is a 1961 Indian Kannada-language film, directed by Aroor Pattabhi and produced by Neerlahalli Thalikerappa. The movie is about the legend of Mallikarjuna Temple, Srisailam, one of the 12 Jyotirlinga of Lord Shiva.

The film stars Rajkumar, Dikki Madhavarao, Balakrishna and Hanumanthachar. The film has musical score by T. A. Kalyanam. The movie was dubbed and released in Telugu as Srisaila Mahatyam. J. Jayalalithaa appeared as a child artiste in one of the song sequences of this movie marking her on-screen debut. While Sarot Ashwath wrote the dialogues, T. N. Balakrishna was specially credited for comedy dialogues. Mahalinga Bhagavathar played a small role in the movie.

== Cast ==
- Rajkumar
- Dikki Madhava Rao
- Balakrishna
- Hanumanthachar
- Jayalalitha
- Anil Kumar
- Gopala Krishna
- Vimalananda Das
- Upendrachar
- Mahalinga Bhagavathar
- Krishnakumar
- Srinivasa Pille
- Vasudeva Girimaji
- Rajendra Krishna
- Krishna Kumari
- Sandhya
- Sheshakumari
- Lakshmidevi
- Shantha
- Kumari Jayalakshmi
- Kumari Ganga
- Kumari Suma
- Papamma
- Rajalakshmi
- Saroja
- Kamalesh Kumari
- Indrani

== Soundtrack ==
The music was composed by T. A. Kalyanam.

| No. | Song | Singers | Lyrics | Length (m:ss) |
|---|---|---|---|---|
| 1 | "Pahi Mahesa" | T. S. Bagavathi | | 03:34 |
| 2 | "Sankara Dayasagara Shambho Shankara" | C. S. Sarojini | Vijaya Narasimha | 02:42 |
| 3 | "Anupama Bhagyavide" | Sarojini | Vijaya Narasimha | 05:08 |
| 4 | "Birugaali Beesidaga" | P. B. Sreenivas | Vijaya Narasimha | 02:00 |
| 5 | "Jagadeesha Sarvesha" | Sarojini | Hunsur Krishna Murthy | 02:15 |
| 6 | "Kailasa Girivasa" | Mangapathy | M. Narendra Babu | 03:27 |
| 7 | "Maanikya Kedhlda" | Rukmani | Ratnakara | 03:05 |
| 8 | "Malle Moggu Naaseri" | Gajalakshmi, Rukmini | Ratnakara | 02:49 |
| 9 | "Mallikaarjunanu Nelesiha" | P. B. Srinivas | Sorat Aswath | 03:42 |
