= Malliyam Mangalam =

- Directed by: S. Soundararajan
- Story by: B. S. Ramiah
- Produced by: Malliyam Rajagopal
- Starring: S. V. Subbaiah; S. V. Sahasranamam; Pandari Bai; S. N. Lakshmi
- Music by: M. K. Athmanathan; T. A. Kalyanam
- Production company: Thamizh Nadu Talkies
- Release date: 17 February 1961
- Country: India
- Language: Tamil

Malliyam Mangalam (transl. Mangalam of Malliyam) is a 1961 Indian Tamil-language film directed by S. Soundararajan. The film stars S. V. Subbaiah, S. V. Sahasranamam, S. N. Lakshmi and Pandari Bai. It is based on a play of the same name by B. S. Ramiah. The film was released in 1961, delayed from July 1960.

== Plot ==
The story focuses on the tribulations experienced by Mangalam, a woman from the village of Malliyam in Tamil Nadu.

== Cast ==
List adapted from the film's song book.

Male cast

- S. V. Subbaiah - as Gunasekara Mudhaliar
- S. V. Sahasranamam - as Raju
- V. R. Rajagopal - as Gopu
- K. Sarangapani - as Major Velu
- T. N. Sivathanu - as Vakkeel Gothandarama Mudhaliar
- A. Veerappan - as Kumaravelu
- A. K. Veerasamy - as Saravanam
- Jiddu - as Guna

Female cast

- S. N. Lakshmi as Malliyam Mangalam
- Pandari Bai - as Bhagyam
- Mynavathi - as Radha
- Devika - as Rohini
- Katpagam - as Maali
- Shanthini - as Vimala
- Susheela - as Thangam
- Chandrika - as Geetha

== Production ==
The film was produced by Malliyam Rajagopal under his own banner Tamizhnadu Talkies and was directed by S. Soundararajan. The story and dialogues were penned by B. S. Ramiah and was based on the play of same name. Cinematography was done by Masthan while the editing was carried out by V. P. Nataraja Mudaliyar. Rama Rao handled the Art direction and the choreography was done by V. Madhavan. The film was made at Citadel studios. The song book says this is the Silver jubilee release of Tamizhnadu Talkies. The play had previously been filmed in Telugu as Santhi Nivasam (1960).

== Soundtrack ==
Music was composed by T. A. Kalyanam together with M. K. Athmanathan who also penned some lyrics. Other lyrics were penned by Kuyilan and V. Seetharaman. The song "Avarinri Naanillai Penne" is a ragamalika in the ragas Sama (also written as Śyāmā), Suddha Sarang and Ananda bhairavi. The song Alli Vizhi Asaiya .. Oviyam Sirikkuthu was released on 78 RPM record only.

Song	Singer/s	Lyricist	Length
"Singaara Velaa Vilaiyaada Vaa"	T. M. Soundararajan & N. L. Ganasaraswathi	V. Seetharaman	
"Kal Kal Kal Enave Kannan Aadinaan"	P. Susheela & group	V. Seetharaman	
"Ammaa Ammaa En Aasai Niraiverumaa"	P. Susheela	Kuyilan	
"Maname Nilai Maaruvathen"	P. Leela	Kuyilan	
"Needhiye Illaiyaa Pengalukke"	P. Susheela	Kuyilan	
"Thirumana Porutham Paathaachu"	A. M. Rajah & P. Susheela	M. K. Athmanathan	
"Avarinri Naan Illai Penne"	M. L. Vasanthakumari	M. K. Athmanathan	03:02
"Sundhara Kannu Indhira Logam Kaattudhu"	A. L. Raghavan & K. Jamuna Rani	M. K. Athmanathan	
"Alli Vizhi Asaiya...Oviyam Sirikkudhu"	A. L. Raghavan & S. Janaki		03:10
