= Madana Mohini =

1953 film

- Theatrical release poster
- Directed by: M. L. Pathi
- Screenplay by: M. V. Sivam; K. V. Parthasarathy
- Story by: Kayatkannazhakan
- Starring: P. V. Narasimha Bharathi; C. R. Rajakumari; P. S. Veerappa; Pollachi Kamala
- Cinematography: K. Prabhakar
- Edited by: C. Rajan
- Music by: K. V. Mahadevan
- Production company: Liberty Pictures
- Release date: 14 March 1953
- Country: India
- Language: Tamil

Madana Mohini is a 1953 Indian Tamil language film directed by M. L. Pathi. The film featured P. V. Narasimha Bharathi, C. R. Rajakumari and Pollachi Kamala in the lead roles. It was released on 14 March 1953.

== Plot ==
A king who does not believe in God has a son and two nieces. The nieces are very pious. One of them, Madana, performs prayers but the king does not like it. Madana guises herself as a male, gets out of the palace and joins a gang of robbers. The gang robs the rich and helps the poor. The prince, also in disguise, meets Madana and tells her that he knows a secret way to the palace room where three precious stones are kept. They go together the palace room but take only one precious stone. However, they are both found and arrested. The king discovers who they really are. He had an idea of marrying his son to the other niece, Mohini, but now realises that his son wants to marry Madana. After many twists and turns, finally, the prince and Madana are united.

== Cast ==
Cast according to the opening credits of the film

Male cast

- Narasimha Bharathi
- Veerappa
- M. L. Pathi
- Navaneetham
- Pulimoottai
- Ezhumalai
- Loose Arumugam
- Velappa
- K. R. V. Rao

Female cast

- C. R. Rajakumari
- Pollachi Kamala
- Angamuthu
- Kantha Bai
- Yasodhara
- Saraswathi
- Pattammal
- Shantha
- Aparanji

== Production ==
The filming was done under the guidance of Jyotish Sinha, a Bengali film personality who was based in Chennai.

== Soundtrack ==
Music was composed by K. V. Mahadevan while the lyrics were penned by M. P. Sivam.

Song	Singer/s	Duration (m:ss)
"Aadhi Mudhalaanavar"	A. P. Komala, N. L. Ganasaraswathi & Group	04:10
"Unmaikke Ulagil Uyarvuthaan Illaiye"	K. V. Mahadevan	03:08
"Pombala-thaanennu Enna Vendaam"	A. P. Komala & Group	04:16
"Nilaiyaadha Thunbam Nehrndhathinaale"	Jikki	03:16
"Peru Sollum Pillai Illaiye"	K. V. Mahadevan & G. Kasthoori	
"Vaanaveedhiyile Vilaiyaadum Vennilaave"	P. Leela	03:15
"Vaazhiya Senthamizh Thaaye"	K. V. Mahadevan	02:48
"Inimaiyaana Neram"	P. Leela	
"Kannodu Kannaayi Rahasiyam Pesi"	K. V. Mahadevan & P. Leela	03:14
"Akara Mudhala Ezhuthellaam...Uliyitta Kallaiyum"	K. R. Lakshmi	
"Ilam Kanru Polave Ullam Thulludhe"	Jikki	
"Ko, Ko, Ko Kokkarako"	A. M. Appadurai	
