= J. Deepa =

Indian politician

Deepa Jayakumar
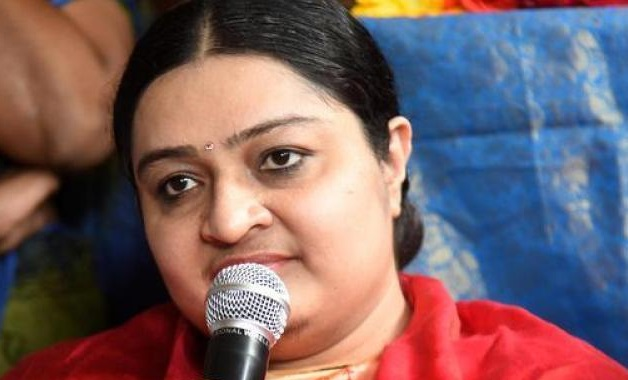
- J. Deepa Madhavan

General Secretary of M.G.R Amma Deepa Peravai
- In office 24 February 2017 – 30 July 2019
- Preceded by: Position established
- Succeeded by: Position abolished

Personal details
- Born: November 10, 1974 (age 51) Madras, Tamil Nadu, India (present-day Chennai)
- Party: M.G.R Amma Deepa Peravai (2017 – 2019)
- Spouse: K. Madhavan (m. 2012)
- Children: 1
- Relatives: Sandhya (grandmother); J. Jayalalithaa (paternal aunt); Vidyavathi (grand-aunt)
- Education: University of Madras (B.A English) Madurai Kamaraj University (M.A. in journalism and mass communication); Vinayaka Missions University (mass communication) Cardiff University, Wales (M.A. in international journalism)
- Profession: Journalist; politician

Deepa Jayakumar (born 10 November 1974), better known as J. Deepa, is a former politician and journalist.

== Personal life ==
Deepa was born on 10 November 1974 to Jayakumar (elder brother of J. Jayalalithaa, former Chief Minister of Tamil Nadu) and Vijayalakshmi. Her parents got married in 1972. She was schooled in Adharsh Vidyalaya, Chennai. She graduated with a bachelor's degree in English literature from the University of Madras. She pursued her master's degree in journalism and mass communication in Madurai Kamarajar University. Later, she worked as a sub-editor in the New Indian Express and then went to the UK in 2010. She completed an M.A. in International Journalism at Cardiff university, in Wales.

Deepa has a brother Deepak Jayakumar. Deepa's family resided in Veda Nilayam, Poes Garden together with J. Jayalalithaa till 1978.

On 10 November 2022, Deepa announced that she gave birth to her girl child on 31 October 2022 and named her Karthiga.

== Career ==
After the death of her aunt Jayalalithaa, in front of Deepa's house, state political party AIADMK volunteers urged her to become party's general secretary, Chief Minister of Tamil Nadu and requested her to fill the place of her aunt. On 24 February 2017, on the occasion of Selvi. Jayalalithaa's birthday, she launched MGR Amma Deepa Peravai. She changed her federation name to AIADMK J. Deepa wing, a team of AIADMK. Husband K. Madhavan supports her with the federation, and is its Deputy General Secretary.

On 12 April 2017, she filed her nomination for R.K Nagar by-poll as an MAD Peravai candidate. The by-poll was later cancelled. She filed again for the 21 December 2017 R. K Nagar by-election. Her nomination was rejected by the returning officer. Sources said Deepa's affidavit was not in order and that she had not filled all the columns, specifically the one seeking information on the value of her properties.

In March 2019, she said that her federation would contest alone for all 40 seats in Tamil Nadu. Later, she decided to tie-up with the AIADMK, saying her outfit belonged to the ruling party and even her followers were in favour of the alliance.

On 30 July 2019, she announced that she was quitting politics, for lack of support, threats, abuses, health issues and peace of mind. She officially dissolved the party on the same date and advised no one to contact her further.
