= Naa Illu =

Naa Illu En Veedu
- Directed by: V. Nagayya
- Written by: Devulapalli Krishnasastri; Sandilyan
- Story by: V. Nagayya
- Produced by: V. Nagayya
- Starring: V. Nagayya; B. Jayamma; T. R. Rajakumari; Mudigonda Lingamurthy
- Cinematography: M. A. Rehman
- Edited by: S. Surya
- Music by: V. Nagayya; A. Rama Rao
- Production company: Our India Films
- Distributed by: Our India Films
- Release date: 1953
- Country: India
- Languages: Telugu; Tamil

Naa Illu (transl. My home) is a 1953 Indian Telugu-language film produced and directed by V. Nagayya. The story was written by Devulapalli Krishnasastri. The film had two dance sequences and full-length Hindi songs sung by Meena Kapoor. The film was simultaneously shot in Tamil as En Veedu with a different supporting cast and locations.

== Plot ==
The story is based on innocent people cheated by rich people. This film is about an ideal man called Sivaram (Nagayya), who lives happily with his wife (Raja Kumari) and two children. They like music very much and want to make their children musicians and singers. He is a responsible bank employee by profession. He goes to Bombay for a financial transaction and gets money. He is trapped by Dhanaraj (Lingamurthy) and gets into the attraction of beautiful Leela (Vidhyavathi). He loses the bank money and goes to jail. By the time he returns, the family conditions are poor. He is even prepared to do some dirty jobs for the sake of his family. His children get encouragement from Balananda Sangham and shine. He gets out of his problems and rejoins the family.

== Cast ==
- V. Nagayya as Sivaram
- T. R. Rajakumari
- Girija
- Vidhyavathi as Leela
- Chhaya Devi

=== Telugu version ===
- B. Jayamma
- Mudigonda Lingamurthy as Dhanraj
- Rama Sharma
- Doraiswamy

=== Tamil cast ===
The list was compiled from The Hindu review article and from the database of Film News Anandan.

- T. S. Balaiah
- V. Gopalakrishnan
- Master Sudhakar
- T. E. Krishnamachari

== Production ==
Both Telugu and Tamil versions of the film were directed by V. Nagayya, who also produced the films under the banner Our India Films. Chandilyan wrote the dialogues. Vidhyavathi, whose real life name was Ambujavalli and who was the younger sister of actress Sandhya (mother of J. Jayalalithaa), played a supporting role in her debut. Since the film was made as a Telugu-Tamil bilingual, Tamil actress T. R. Rajakumari was chosen as one of the leads. There were two dance sequences for which the songs were in Hindi, both sung by Meena Kapoor of Bombay. Choreography was done by Satyam. The film was shot at Vauhini and Revathi studios and was processed at Vijaya Lab. The Tamil version was censored on 16 January 1953 and was 17245 feet in length.

== Soundtrack ==
=== Telugu soundtrack ===
Song	Singer/s	Lyricist	Duration (m:ss)
"Bangaaru Pandeti Maabhaaratadesana"			
"Namasthe Matha Namaste Matha"			
"Adigadigo Gagana Seema"	T. A. Mothi & M. L. Vasanthakumari	Devulapalli Krishnasastri	03:10
"Adigadigo Gagana Seema"	R. Balasaraswathi & Jikki	Devulapalli Krishnasastri	03:39
"Gobbillo Gobbillo"	N. L. Ganasaraswathi & group	Devulapalli Krishnasastri	03:07
"Ravamma Ravamma Ratanala Bomma"	N. L. Ganasaraswathi & N. Lalitha	Devulapalli Krishnasastri	03:13
"Emani Basaladeve Emani"	N. L. Ganasaraswathi		02:20
"Vinnara Janulara Veenulara"	R. Balasaraswathi & Jikki	Devulapalli Krishnasastri	03:39
"Aura Kalamahima Teliyaga"			
"Pommu Bayaluderi Ika"			
"Gatilēni Bratukayena"	V. J. Varma		02:32
"Karucīkati Musindoyi Punnama"			
"Hari Hari Pushpa Hari" Hindi	Meena Kapoor	Kashyap	
"Ha Ha Ha My Hasti Gadi Aayi" Hindi	Meena Kapoor	Mohan	

=== Tamil soundtrack ===
Music was composed by V. Nagayya assisted by A. Rama Rao. Lyrics were penned by Papanasam Sivan, Surabhi, Kashyap and Mohan.

Song	Singer/s	Lyricist	Duration (m:ss)
"Pon Vilaiyum Deiveega"		Papanasam Sivan	
"Paninthen Thaye Pannthen Thanthaiye"		Papanasam Sivan	
"Konjum Mozhi Maindharkale"	T. A. Mothi and M. L. Vasanthakumari	Papanasam Sivan	03:10
"Konjum Mozhi Maindharkale"	N. L. Ganasaraswathi and N. Lalitha	Papanasam Sivan	03:39
"Pongalo Pongal"	N. L. Ganasaraswathi and group	Papanasam Sivan	03:07
"Kanmaniye Kanmaniye"	N. L. Ganasaraswathi and N. Lalitha	Surabhi	03:13
"Ennenna Aasai Kaatinaaye"	N. L. Ganasaraswathi	Surabhi	02:20
"Bhoomiyile Oru Punniya Kathai"	R. Balasaraswathi and Jikki	Surabhi	03:39
"Endha Ooru Sondhamingu"		Surabhi	
"Nilaiyilla Vaazhvu Idhu Thaanaa"	(Radha) Jayalakshmi	Surabhi	
"Kaalamaam Vellamadhile"	V. J. Varma	Surabhi	02:32
"Poorana Chandiran Sirikkudhu Paar"	N. L. Ganasaraswathi	Surabhi	
"Hari Hari Pushpa Hari" Hindi	Meena Kapoor	Kashyap	
"Ha Ha Ha My Hasti Gadi Aayi" Hindi	Meena Kapoor	Mohan	

== Reception ==
Film historian Randor Guy wrote in 2009 that the film, despite its good story and performance by Nagayya and others, was not successful at the box office.
