= M. K. Athmanathan =

Tamil music composer

M. K. Athmanathan (1925 – 15 July 2013) was a music director and lyricist in Tamil cinema. He was honoured by the Tamil Nadu government with the Kalaimamani award in 1978.

== Early life ==
He was born in the village Valliyoor in Tirunelveli district of Tamil Nadu, India. He started life as a goldsmith but his interest in the arts made him to join the drama troupe of T. K. Shanmugam at the age of 11.

== Career ==
He entered the Tamil cinema in 1954 as the music director of the film Ratha Pasam. He also wrote 3 songs for the film.

He scored music for 20 films and penned lyrics for more than 120 songs.

== Career ==
He married Thanlakshmi, they has two daughters (Madhavi & Amutha) and one son Elangovan.

== Filmography ==
=== As music director ===
- Ratha Pasam (1954)
- Naalu Veli Nilam (1959)
- Malliyam Mangalam (1961)

=== As lyricist ===
- Ratha Pasam (1954)
- Maheswari (1955)
- Amara Deepam (1956)
- Kula Deivam (1956)
- Raja Rani (1956)
- Rangoon Radha (1956)
- Mallika (1957)
- Pudhaiyal (1957)
- Nadodi Mannan (1958)
- Thedi Vandha Selvam (1958)
- Thirumanam (1958)
- Naalu Veli Nilam (1959)
- Naatukoru Nallaval (1959)
- Kalathur Kannamma (1960)
- Petra Manam (1960)
- Thilakam (1960)
- Malliyam Mangalam (1961)
- Naaga Nandhini (1961)
- Nallavan Vazhvan (1961)
- Thirudathe (1961)
- Muthu Mandapam (1962)
- Vikramadhithan 1962)
- Ethaiyum Thangum Ithaiyam (1962)
- Alli (1964)
- Kathal Paduthum Padu (1966) - 1 song

== Death ==
Athmanathan died on 15 July 2013 at the age of 88.
